= List of foreign Super League Greece players =

This is a list of foreign football players in Super League Greece. The players written with bold are currently playing in the league.

== Greek players naturalized and born abroad ==
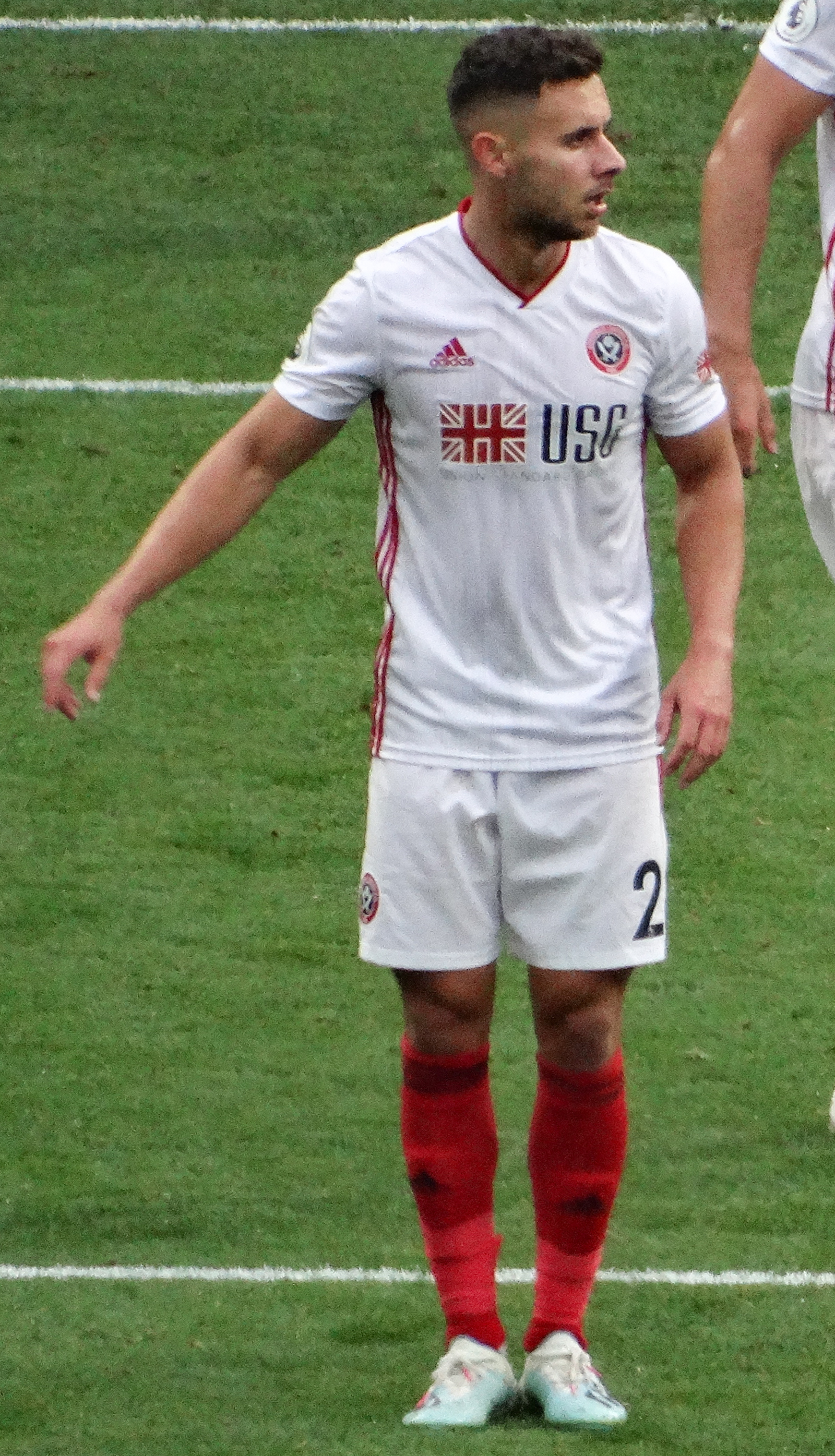
George Baldock

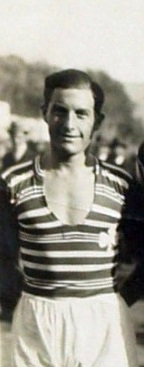
Angelos Messaris

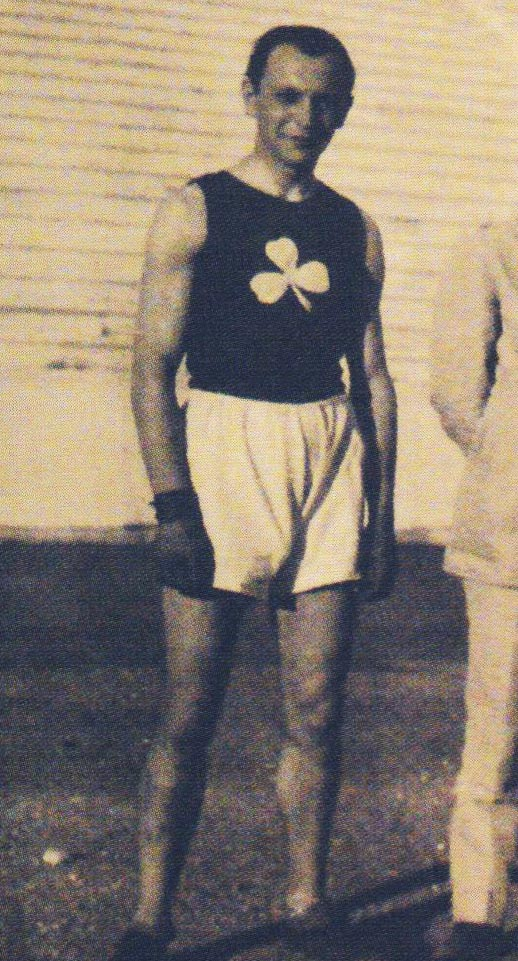
Apostolos Nikolaidis

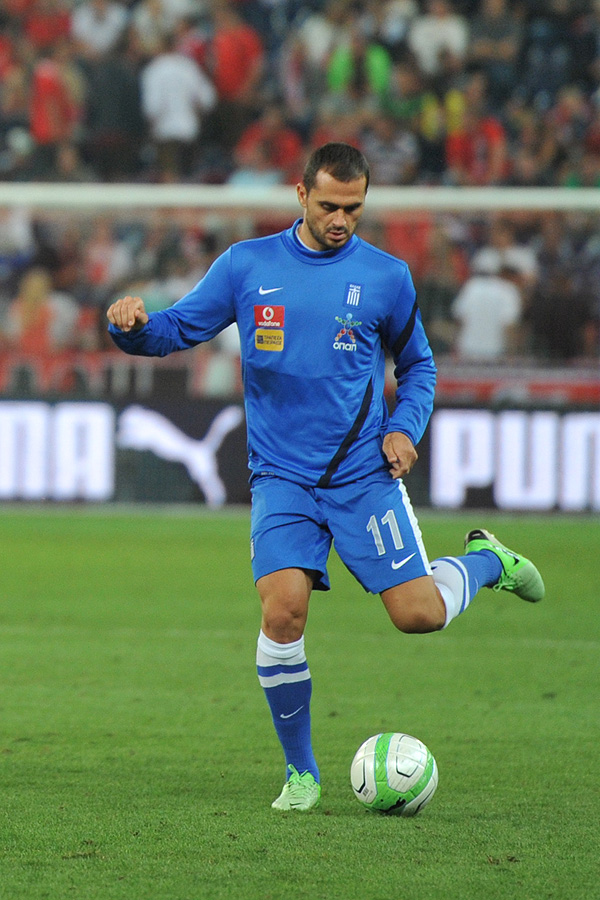
Loukas Vyntra

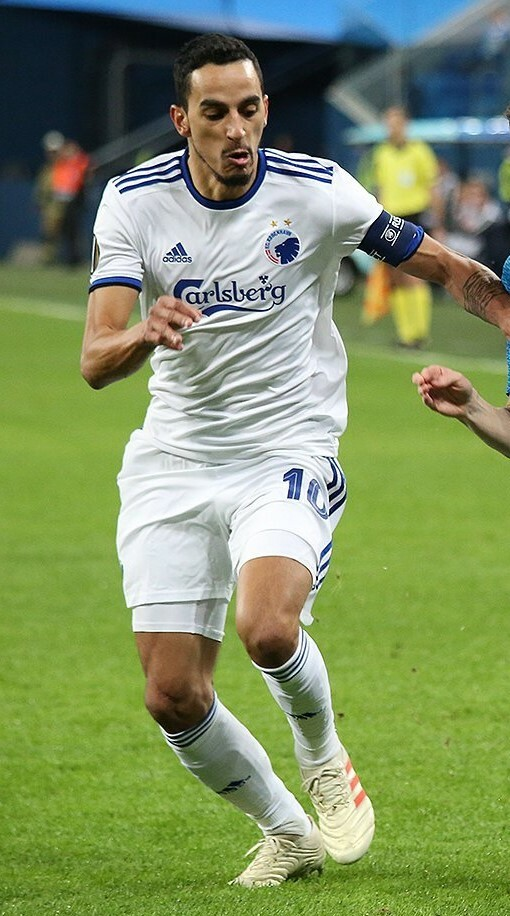
Zeca

- (West Germany) Loukas Apostolidis – Veria – 2007–2008
- (England) George Baldock – Panathinaikos – 2024
- (Cape Verde) Daniel Batista – Ethnikos Piraeus, AEK Athens, Olympiacos, Aris – 1987–2001
- (Brazil) Bruno Chalkiadakis – Ergotelis, Panionios, PAS Giannina, AEL – 2011–2012, 2013–2016, 2017–2018, 2019
- (Albania) Elini Dimoutsos – Panathinaikos, OFI, Atromitos, Asteras Tripolis, Platanias, Lamia – 2007–2011, 2011–2020
- (West Germany) Georgios Donis – PAS Giannina, Panathinaikos, AEK Athens – 1990–1996, 1997–1999
- (Albania) Fiorin Durmishaj – Panionios, Olympiacos, Aris, AEL, OFI – 2014–2023
- (France) (Turkey) Raymond Étienne – PAOK – 1928–1934
- (Germany) Dimitrios Ferfelis – PAS Giannina – 2015–2017
- (Germany) Tryfon Gioudas – Panthrakikos – 2015–2016
- (Germany) Dimitrios Grammozis – Ergotelis, Kerkyra – 2007–2009, 2010–2012
- (West Germany) Minas Hantzidis – Olympiacos, Kastoria, Iraklis, Veria – 1989–1999
- (Soviet Union) Vasilis Hatzipanagis – Iraklis – 1975–1990
- (Germany) José Holebas – Olympiacos – 2010–2014, 2020–2021
- (Germany) Nikolaos Ioannidis – Olympiacos, Asteras Tripolis, Apollon Smyrnis, Ionikos – 2012–2013, 2016–2017, 2020–2023
- (Albania) Giorgos Kakko – PAOK – 2015–2016
- (Kazakhstan) Savvas Kofidis – Olympiacos, Aris, Iraklis – 1989–1999
- (Albania) Panagiotis Kone – AEK Athens, Iraklis – 2005–2010, 2017–2018
- (Albania) Ioannis Kontis – Panionios – 2006–2009
- (West Germany) Kostas Konstantinidis – Pierikos, OFI, Panathinaikos – 1991–1993, 1994–1999, 2005–2007
- (Germany) Giorgos Machlelis – Niki Volos, Platanias – 2014–2015
- (Bulgaria) Georgios Manthatis – Olympiacos, PAS Giannina, Panetolikos – 2016–2021
- (Albania) Ilias Melkas – Iraklis – 2008–2009
- (South Africa) Angelos Messaris – Panathinaikos – 1927–1931
- (Soviet Union) Giannis Milopoulos – AEK Athens – 1990–1991
- (West Germany) Dimitrios Moutas – OFI, Athinaikos, Kavala, Panelefsiniakos – 1994–1999
- (Albania) Andreas Ntoi – Olympiacos – 2022–2025
- (Bulgaria) Apostolos Nikolaidis – Panathinaikos – 1914–1928
- (West Germany) Demis Nikolaidis – Apollon Athens, AEK Athens – 1993–2003
- (Albania) Sotiris Ninis – Panathinaikos, PAOK, Volos, PAS Giannina, A.E. Kifisia – 2006–2012, 2013–2016, 2020–2022, 2023–2024
- (Australia) Avraam Papadopoulos – Aris, Olympiacos – 2003–2014, 2019–2021
- (Uzbekistan) Dimitrios Papadopoulos – Panathinaikos, Levadiakos, Panthrakikos, Atromitos, PAOK, Asteras Tripolis, Panetolikos – 2003–2008, 2011–2017
- (United States) Peter Philipakos – AEK Athens, Olympiacos – 2004–2006
- (South Africa) Panagiotis Retsos – Olympiacos – 2016–2018, 2022–
- (Italy) Nino Sallusto – PAOK – 1959–1960
- (Australia) Giannis Samaras – OFI, Panathinaikos – 1984–1996
- (Turkey) Alekos Sofianidis – AEK Athens, Panachaiki – 1959–1970
- (Finland) Alexandros Souflas – Atromitos – 2006–2007
- (Germany) Giorgos Theodoridis – Aris, Athinaikos, PAOK, Panathinaikos, Ergotelis, Panetolikos – 1997–2008, 2011–2012, 2013–2015
- (Germany) Panagiotis Triadis – Skoda Xanthi, Apollon Smyrnis, PAS Giannina – 2012–2019, 2021–2022
- (Georgia (country)) Michalis Tsamourlidis – AEK Athens, Panionios – 2010–2011, 2012–2013
- (Cyprus) Kostas Vasiliou – AEK Athens – 1936–1945
- (Germany) Odysseas Vlachodimos – Panathinaikos – 2016–2018
- (Germany) Panagiotis Vlachodimos – Skoda Xanthi, Olympiacos, Platanias, Ergotelis, Panathinaikos – 2011–2015, 2016–2017
- (Poland) Giannis Vonortas – Panathinaikos, Levadiakos – 1983–1989
- (Albania) Marios Vrousai – Olympiacos – 2018–2024
- (Czechoslovakia) Loukas Vyntra – Paniliakos, Panathinaikos, Lamia – 1999–2000, 2003–2013, 2019–2022
- (Georgia (country)) Gennadios Xenodochof – AEL – 2016–2017
- (Portugal) Zeca – Panathinaikos – 2011–2018, 2023–2025

== Africa (CAF) ==
=== Algeria ===
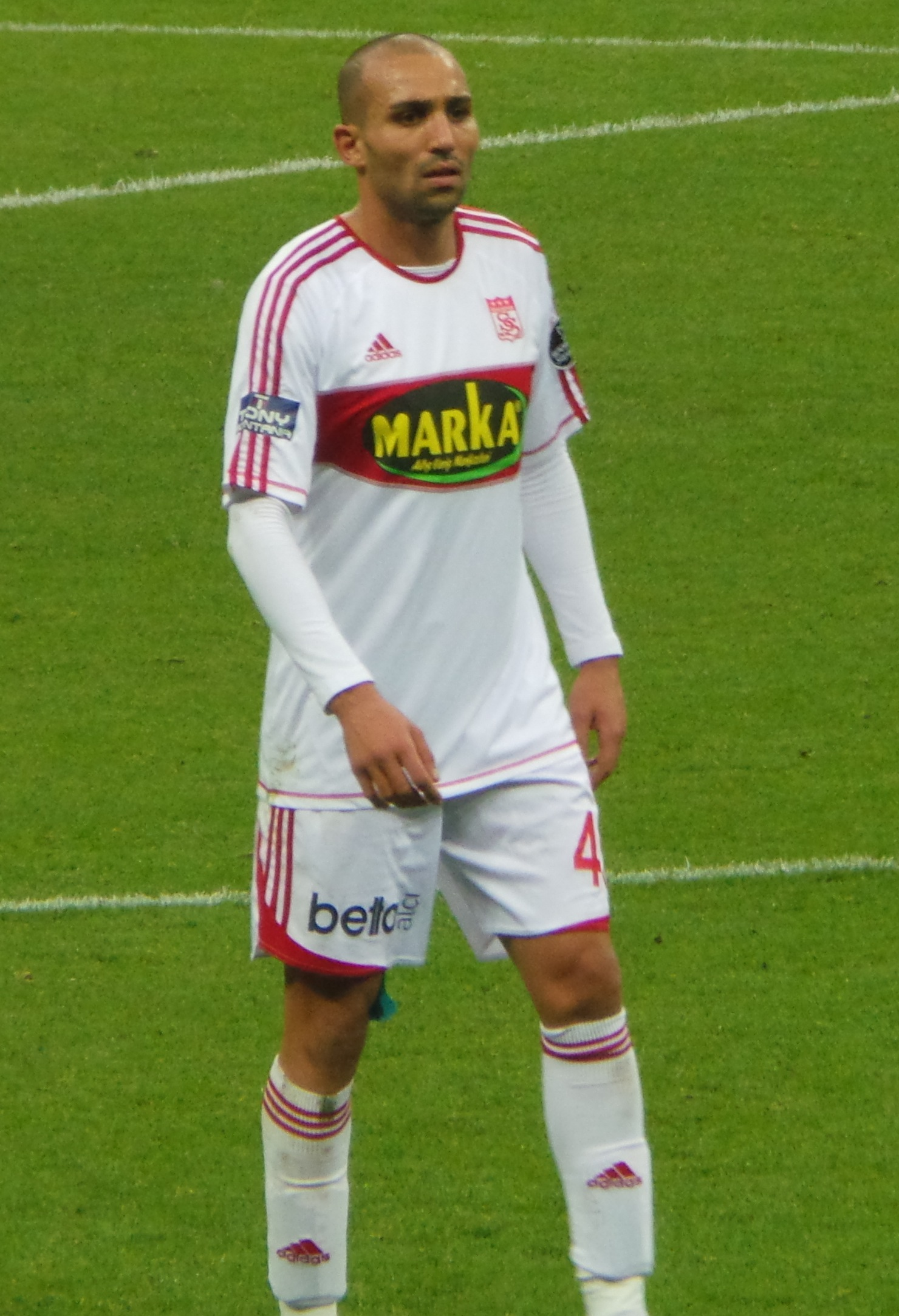
Rafik Djebbour

- Djamel Abdoun – Kavala, Olympiacos, Veria – 2010–2013, 2015–2016
- Mehdi Abeid – Panathinaikos – 2013–2014, 2015–2016
- Laurent Agouazi – Atromitos – 2014–2015
- Salim Arrache – PAS Giannina, Asteras Tripolis, AEL Kalloni – 2009–2011, 2015
- Yassine Benzia – Olympiacos – 2019–2020
- Rachid Bouhenna – Ionikos – 2023
- Ismaël Bouzid – PAS Giannina – 2011–2012
- Liassine Cadamuro – Volos – 2020
- Mohamed Chalali – Panionios – 2010–2011
- Sofyane Cherfa – Panthrakikos – 2012–2013, 2014–2016
- Rafik Djebbour – Atromitos, Panionios, AEK Athens, Olympiacos – 2005–2013, 2015–2016
- Samy Faraj – Asteras Tripolis – 2024–2025
- Mohamed Farès – Panserraikos – 2024–2025
- Samy Frioui – AEL – 2018
- Riad Hammadou – PAS Giannina – 2002–2003
- Florent Hanin – Panetolikos – 2014
- Yacine Hadji– Veria – 2016–2017
- Yasser Larouci – A.E. Kifisia – 2025–
- Carl Medjani – Olympiacos – 2013
- Karim Mouzaoui – Panionios, Apollon Kalamarias, Veria – 2001–2003, 2004–2006, 2007–2008
- Youssef Salimi – Ethnikos Piraeus – 1999–2000
- Bark Seghiri – Iraklis – 2004–2006
- Karim Soltani – Iraklis, Skoda Xanthi, PAS Giannina – 2010–2011, 2013–2018
- Hillal Soudani – Olympiacos – 2019–2021
- Aymen Tahar – Panetolikos – 2019–2021
- Mehdi Terki – Xanthi – 2019–2020
- Ahmed Touba – Panathinaikos – 2025–
- Antar Yahia – Platanias – 2014

=== Angola ===
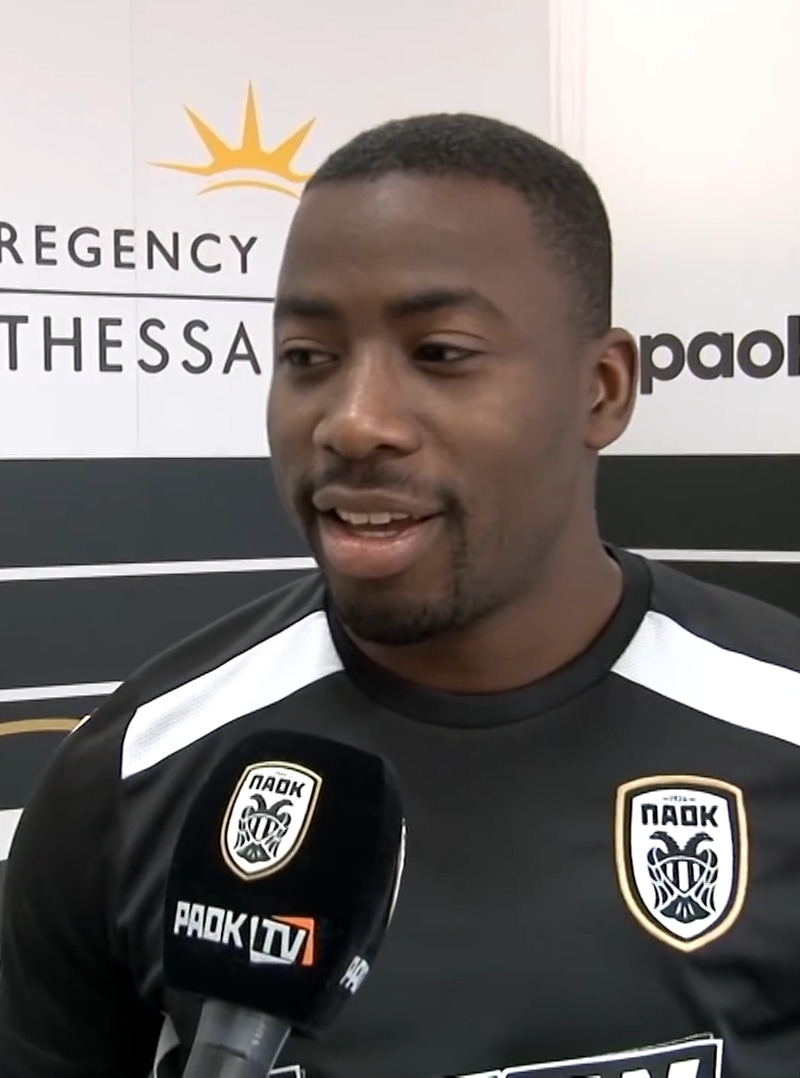
Djalma Campos

- Djalma Campos – PAOK – 2016–2018
- David Carmo – Olympiacos – 2024–2025, 2026–
- Núrio Fortuna – Volos – 2025–
- Bruno Gaspar – Olympiacos – 2019–2020
- Luís Lourenço – Panionios – 2006–2009
- Manucho – Panathinaikos – 2008
- Marco Paulo – Ionikos – 2006–2007
- Rudy – Skoda Xanthi – 2014
- Zini – AEK Athens, Levadiakos – 2023–
- Francisco Zuela – Akratitos, Skoda Xanthi, PAOK, Atromitos, Apollon Smyrnis – 2005–2009, 2010–2012

=== Benin ===
- Moise Adilehou – Kerkyra, Levadiakos – 2016–2019
- Rudy Gestede – Panetolikos – 2021
- Yohan Roche – Iraklis – 2026–

=== Burkina Faso ===
- Habib Bamogo – Panetolikos – 2011–2012
- Bryan Dabo – Aris – 2022–2023
- Abdul Diallo – Panthrakikos – 2008–2010
- Ismahila Ouédraogo – Volos, Panserraikos, Atromitos – 2022, 2023–2025
- Rahim Ouédraogo – Skoda Xanthi – 2007
- Souleymane Sawadogo – Levadiakos – 2018–2019
- Patrick Zoundi – Asteras Tripolis, Panserraikos – 2006–2009

=== Cameroon ===
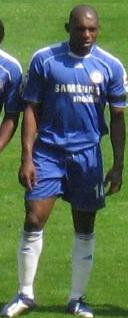
Geremi

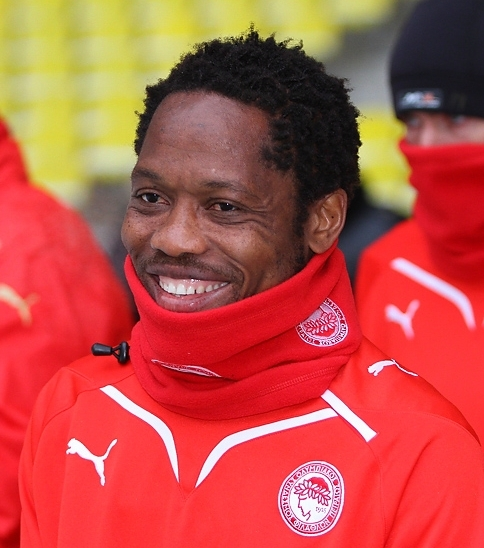
Jean Makoun

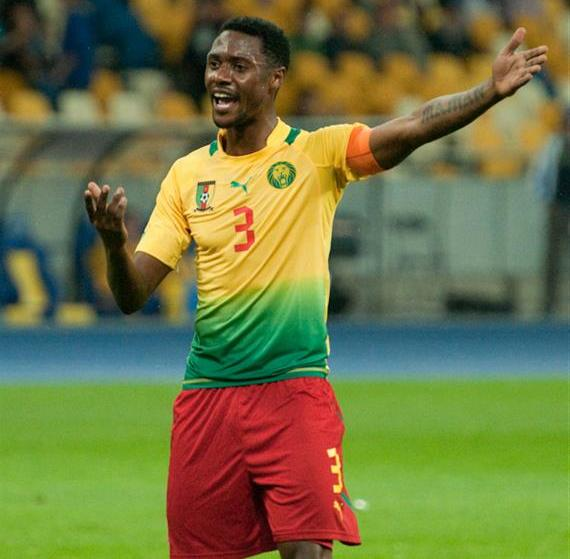
Nicolas Nkoulou

- Martin Abena – Skoda Xanthi – 2009
- Thierry Modo Abouna – AEL – 2004–2007
- Jourdain Assen – Asteras Tripolis – 2016–2017
- Jean-Hugues Ateba – Atromitos – 2009–2011
- Patrick Bahanack – Lamia, Levadiakos – 2019–2023
- Sébastien Bassong – Volos – 2019
- Christian Bekamenga – Skoda Xanthi – 2010–2011
- Steve Leo Beleck – Panthrakikos, AEK Athens – 2009–2010, 2011–2012
- André Bikey – Panetolikos – 2013–2014
- Keynes Nouck Bong – Panthrakikos – 2013–2014
- Gaëtan Bong – Olympiacos – 2013–2014
- Olivier Boumal – Panetolikos, Levadiakos, Panionios, Panathinaikos – 2011–2012, 2013, 2014–2017
- Serge Branco – Levadiakos – 2009–2010
- Guy Bwelle – Apollon Smyrnis, Ergotelis – 1998–2000 2006–2007
- Nicolas Dikoumé – Apollon Smyrnis, Skoda Xanthi – 1996–2000
- Roudolphe Douala – Asteras Tripolis – 2008–2009
- Pierre Ebéde – Apollon Kalamarias, Panathinaikos – 1998–2002, 2005–2007
- David Embé – AEL – 1994–1996
- Devis Epassy – Levadiakos, Lamia, OFI – 2017–2022
- Joël Epalle – Ethnikos Piraeus, Panachaiki, Aris, Panathinaikos, Iraklis – 1998–2007
- Emile Eyidi – Panionios – 1999–2000
- David Eto'o – Aris – 2007–2008
- Nana Falemi – Ergotelis – 2005
- Guy Feutchine – PAS Giannina, PAOK – 2000–2006
- Jean-Pierre Fiala – AEL – 1995–1996
- Eugene Fomumbod – Aris – 2005
- Geremi – AEL – 2010–2011
- Antonio Ghomsi – Skoda Xanthi – 2015
- Jérôme Guihoata – Panionios – 2016–2018
- Serge Honi – AEL – 1995–1996
- Martin Hongla – Aris – 2026–
- Samuel Inogue – Aris – 2005
- Charles Itandje – Kavala, Atromitos, PAOK – 2009–2015
- Jean Jules – Aris – 2023–2025
- Fabrice Kah – Panserraikos – 2024–2025
- Raymond Kalla – Panachaiki – 1995–1998
- Mulamba Kaniemba – AEL –
- Wilfrid Kaptoum – Panserraikos – 2024–2025
- Dorge Kouemaha – Aris – 2005
- Pierre Kunde – Olympiacos, Atromitos – 2021–2024
- Louis Ngwat-Mahop – Iraklis – 2010–2011
- Jean Makoun – Olympiacos – 2011–2012
- Cédric Mandjeck – Veria – 2014–2015
- Cyrille Mangan – Skoda Xanthi – 1997–1999
- Alphonse Luc Mebounou – Iraklis – 1995–1996
- Lucien Mettomo – Veria – 2008–2009
- Valéry Mézague – Panetolikos – 2011–2012
- Serge Mimpo – Panachaiki, Ethnikos Asteras – 1996–1998, 2000–2001
- Marcus Mokaké – Veria – 2013
- Benjamin Moukandjo – AEL – 2021
- Jean-Jacques Missé-Missé – Ethnikos Asteras – 1999–2000
- Harold Moukoudi – AEK Athens – 2022–
- Alexis N'Gambi – Panthrakikos – 2009
- Yvan Neyou – Volos – 2026–
- Jacques Alberto Ngwem – Atromitos – 2014–2015
- Nicolas Nkoulou – Aris – 2022–2023
- Patrice Noukeu – Skoda Xanthi – 2007–2008
- Franck Songo'o – PAS Giannina – 2014
- Kévin Soni – Asteras Tripolis – 2021–2023
- Jean Dénis Wanga – Panelefsiniakos, Egaleo, Kallithea – 1998–1999, 2001–2005
- Rooney Eva Wankewai – Asteras Tripolis – 2018
- Banana Yaya – Platanias, Olympiacos, Panionios – 2014–2019

=== Cape Verde ===
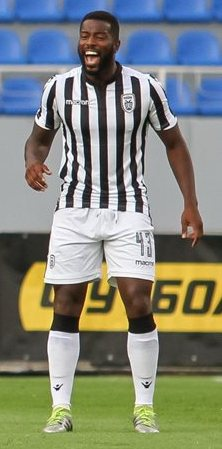
Fernando Varela

- Brito – Xanthi – 2017–2019
- Carlitos – Iraklis – 2015
- Jerson Cabral – Ionikos – 2021–2022, 2023
- Jovane Cabral – Olympiacos – 2024
- José Emílio Furtado – AEK Athens – 2012–2013
- Noni Lima – Panionios – 1976–1988
- Garry Rodrigues – PAOK, Olympiacos – 2015–2017, 2021–2023
- Lisandro Semedo – OFI – 2019–2020
- Valdo – Asteras Tripolis – 2014
- Fernando Varela – PAOK – 2016–2022
- Toni Varela – Levadiakos – 2014

=== Central African Republic ===
- David Manga – Asteras Tripolis – 2018–2019
- Frédéric Nimani – PAOK, OFI – 2012, 2013–2014
- Lionel Zouma – Asteras Tripolis – 2016–2018

=== Chad ===
- Azrack Mahamat – Platanias, Levadiakos – 2014–2016
- Marius Mouandilmadji – Olympiacos – 2026–
- Joseph Antoine Na'a – A.E. Kifisia – 2025–2026

=== Comoros ===
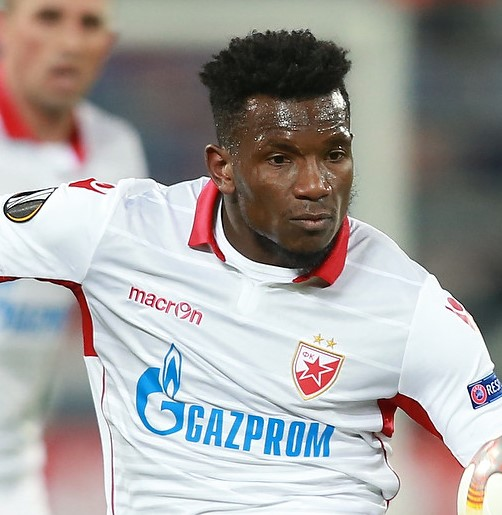
El Fardou Ben

- El Fardou Ben – Veria, Olympiacos, Levadiakos, Panionios – 2013–2018
- Halifa Soulé – OFI, Veria – 2016–2017
- Mohamed Youssouf – Ergotelis, Veria, Levadiakos – 2014–2018

=== Congo (Republic of the Congo) ===
- Thievy Bifouma – OFI, A.E. Kifisia – 2022–2024
- Clévid Dikamona – Platanias – 2017–2018
- Christopher Maboulou – PAS Giannina – 2016–2017
- Delvin N'Dinga – Olympiacos – 2013–2015
- Bernard Onanga Itoua – Platanias – 2014–2016
- Katanga Kibikula – Ionikos – 2006–2007
- Bradley Mazikou – Aris – 2022–2023
- Christopher Samba – Panathinaikos – 2016–2017

=== Dominican Republic ===
- Noam Baumann – OFI – 2023–2025

=== DR Congo (Democratic Republic of the Congo) ===
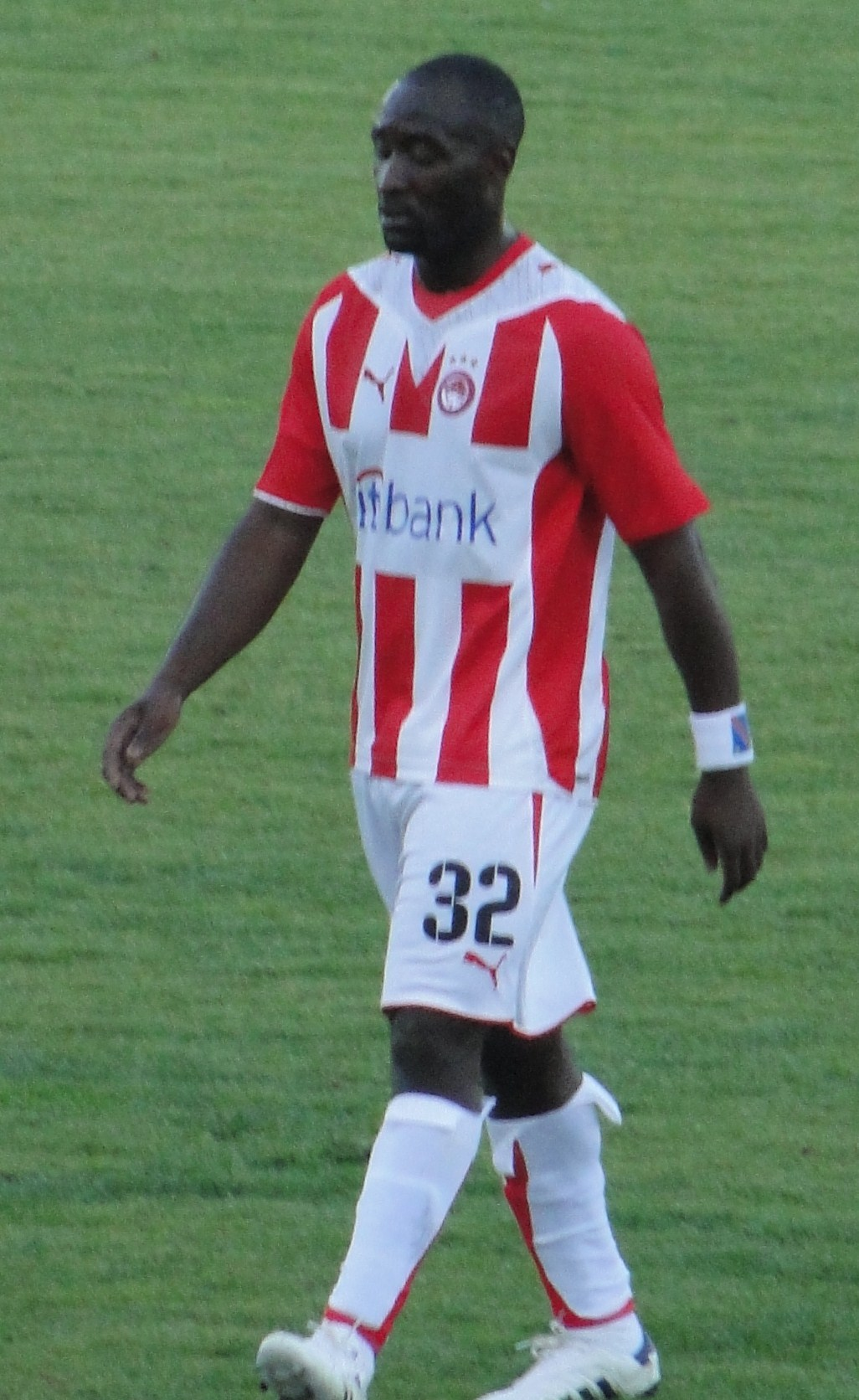
Lomana LuaLua

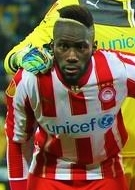
Arthur Masuaku

- Cédric Bakambu – Olympiacos – 2022–2023
- Simon Banza – PAOK – 2026–
- Dylan Batubinsika – AEL – 2026
- Jonathan Bijimine – Apollon Smyrnis – 2017–2018
- Nill De Pauw – Atromitos – 2020
- Patrick Dimbala – Levadiakos, PAS Giannina, Panionios, AEL Kalloni – 2007–2010, 2011–2012, 2013
- Andia Fotila – Rodos – 1982–1983
- Masengo Ilunga – Ethnikos Piraeus – 1982–1988
- Gaël Kakuta – AEL – 2026
- Wilson Kamavuaka – Panetolikos – 2016–2017
- Albert Kanta Kambala – Rodos – 1981–1983
- Jean Kasimba – Iraklis – 1997–2000
- Nzangani Kidoda – Iraklis – 1998–1999
- Kazenga LuaLua – Levadiakos – 2022–2023
- Lomana LuaLua – Olympiacos – 2007–2008, 2009–2010
- Paul-José M'Poku – Panathinaikos – 2016–2017
- Kanieba Malouma – AEL – 1987–1989
- Arthur Masuaku – Olympiacos – 2014–2016
- Gaston Mobati – Ethnikos Piraeus – 1989–1990
- Samuel Moutoussamy – Atromitos – 2025–
- Lokenge Mungongo – Iraklis – 1998–1999
- Muscal Mvuezolo – Egaleo, Akratitos – 2003, 2005–2006
- Clarck N'Sikulu – Platanias, Atromitos – 2017–2021
- Yeni Ngbakoto – Panathinaikos – 2021–2022
- Joël Tshibamba – AEL – 2011
- Aaron Tshibola – Lamia, Levadiakos – 2025–2026
- Mukadi Tshimanga – Ethnikos Piraeus – 1990
- Alain Wambamba – Iraklis – 1998
- Gabriel Zakuani – AEL Kalloni – 2014

=== Egypt ===
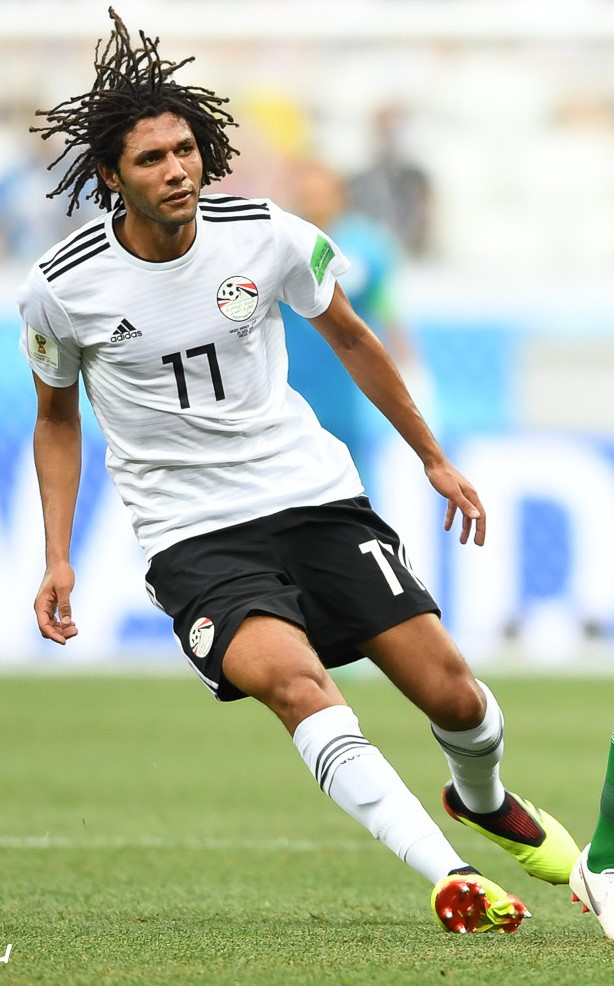
Mohamed Elneny

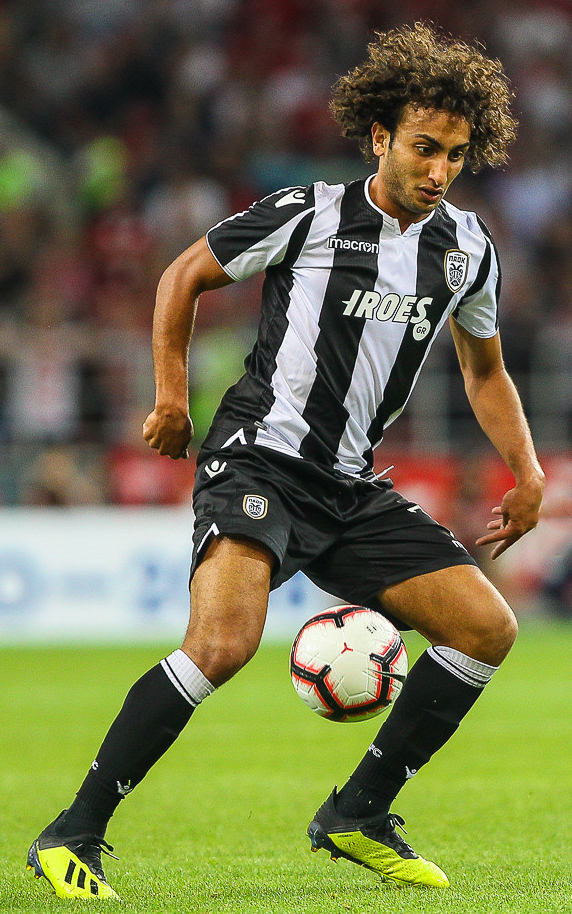
Amr Warda

- Amir Azmy – PAOK – 2005–2006
- Amr El Halwani – Apollon Kalamarias – 2006–2007
- Nader El-Sayed – Akratitos – 2002–2003
- Taha El-Sayed – PAOK – 1990
- Mohamed Elneny – Levadiakos – 2026–
- Ali Ghazal – AEL – 2020
- Karim Hamed – Panserraikos – 2024–2026
- Ahmed Hassan – Olympiacos – 2018–2019, 2020–2023
- Hossam Hassan – PAOK – 1990–1991
- Ibrahim Hassan – PAOK – 1990–1991
- Ahmed Magdy – Atromitos, Panionios – 2005–2007
- Bilal Mazhar – Panathinaikos, Lamia – 2022–2024, 2025
- Basem Morsy – AEL – 2018
- Abdel Sattar Sabry – PAOK – 1999–2000
- Shikabala – PAOK, Apollon Smyrnis – 2005–2006, 2018–2019
- Magdy Tolba – PAOK – 1989–1994
- Amr Warda – Panetolikos, PAOK, Atromitos, AEL, Volos, Panserraikos – 2015–2021, 2024–2026

=== Ethiopia ===
- Yilma Ketema – Aris – 1964–1965

=== Equatorial Guinea ===
- Kike Boula – Xanthi – 2017–2018
- Lawrence Doe – Platanias – 2012–2013
- Viera Ellong – Kerkyra – 2015–2017
- Josete Miranda – Kalamata – 2026–

=== Gabon ===
- Henry Antchouet – AEL – 2007
- Daniel Cousin – AEL – 2010–2011
- Dieudonné Londo – Akratitos – 2005–2006
- Lévy Madinda – Asteras Tripolis – 2017–2018
- Jean-Martin Mouloungui – Panelefsiniakos – 1998–1999
- Guy-Roger Nzeng – Paniliakos – 1997–1999

=== Ghana ===
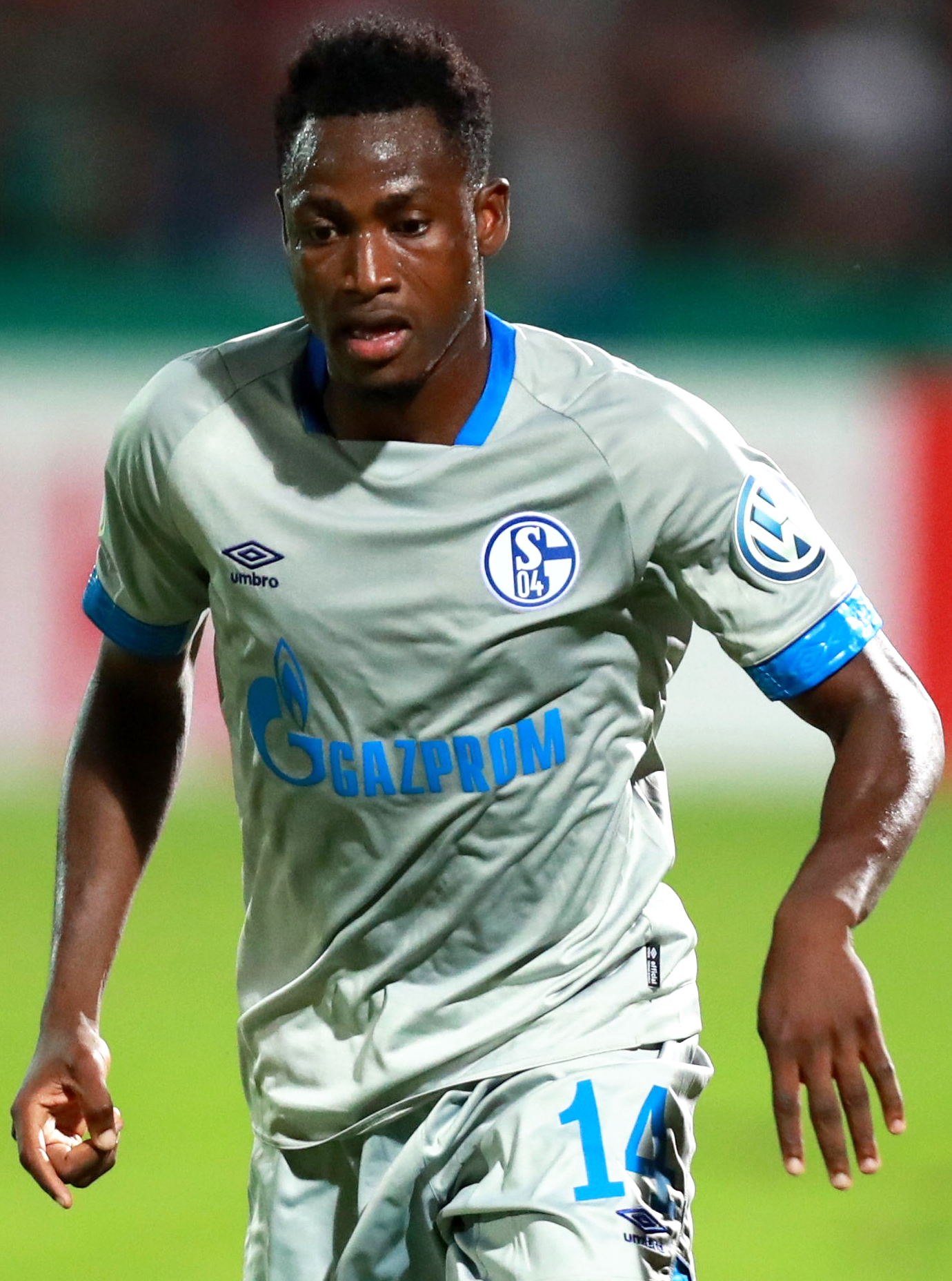
Baba Rahman

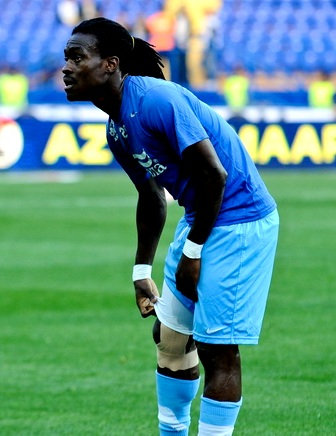
Derek Boateng

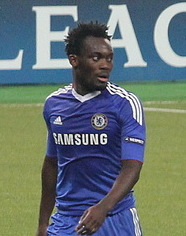
Michael Essien

- Felix Aboagye – Olympiacos – 1998–1999
- Mohammed Abubakari – Panserraikos, PAOK, Levadiakos, AEL, Doxa Drama – 2008–2012
- Ishmael Addo – Ergotelis – 2005
- Joe Addo – Ethnikos Piraeus – 1998–1999
- Simon Addo – Kalamata – 1997–1999
- David Addy – Panetolikos – 2011–2012
- Joseph Agyriba – AEK Athens – 2012–2013
- Frank Amankwah – Iraklis – 1999–2000
- Kofi Amponsah – Panelefsiniakos, Olympiacos, PAOK, AEK Athens, Egaleo, Apollon Kalamarias – 1998–2008
- Mark Nyaaba Asigba – Olympiacos, Veria, Lamia – 2016–2021
- Foster Bastios – Kalamata – 1997–1998
- Emanuel Bentil – Kalamata – 2000–2001
- Richmond Boakye – Lamia – 2022–2023
- Derek Boateng – Kalamata, Panathinaikos, OFI – 1999–2003
- Raman Chibsah – Apollon Smyrnis, Ionikos – 2022–2023
- Francis Dickoh – Aris – 2011–2012
- Afo Dodoo – Kalamata – 1995–1998
- Daniel Edusei – Athinaikos, Ethnikos Asteras, Egaleo – 2000–2007
- Michael Essien – Panathinaikos – 2015–2016
- King Faisal – AEL – 2025–2026
- Eugene Frimpong – Kalamata – 2026–
- Baffour Gyan – Kalamata – 1997–1998
- Ebenezer Hagan – Kalamata, Iraklis, PAOK – 1995–2005
- Stephen Hammond – Levadiakos – 2022–2023, 2024–2026
- Samuel Inkoom – Platanias – 2014
- Samuel Johnson – Kalamata – 1995–1996
- Owusu-Ansah Kontoh – AEL – 2016–2018
- Bennard Yao Kumordzi – Egaleo, Panionios – 2006–2012
- Marshal Kwafo – Akratitos – 2003–2004
- Lumor – Aris, A.E. Kifisia – 2021–2022, 2023–2024
- Emmanuel Mensah – Atromitos, Kerkyra – 2017–2018
- Kelvin Ofori – Atromitos – 2026–
- Peter Ofori-Quaye – Kalamata, Olympiacos, OFI – 1995–2003, 2005–2007
- Abdul Osman – Kerkyra, Lamia – 2011–2012, 2018
- Quincy Owusu-Abeyie – Panathinaikos – 2011–2014
- Oscar Pokou – Panachaiki – 1984–1985
- Baba Rahman – PAOK – 2021, 2023–
- Αbdul Razak – AEL Kalloni – 2014–2015
- Yaw Rush – Proodeftiki – 2003–2004
- Charles Sampson – Kalamata, OFI – 1997–1998, 1999–2002
- Abdul Aziz Tetteh – Platanias – 2013–2015
- Mubarak Wakaso – Panathinaikos – 2016–2017
- Eric Warden – Levadiakos – 2014
- Seidu Yahaya – AEK Athens – 2009–2010

=== Guinea ===
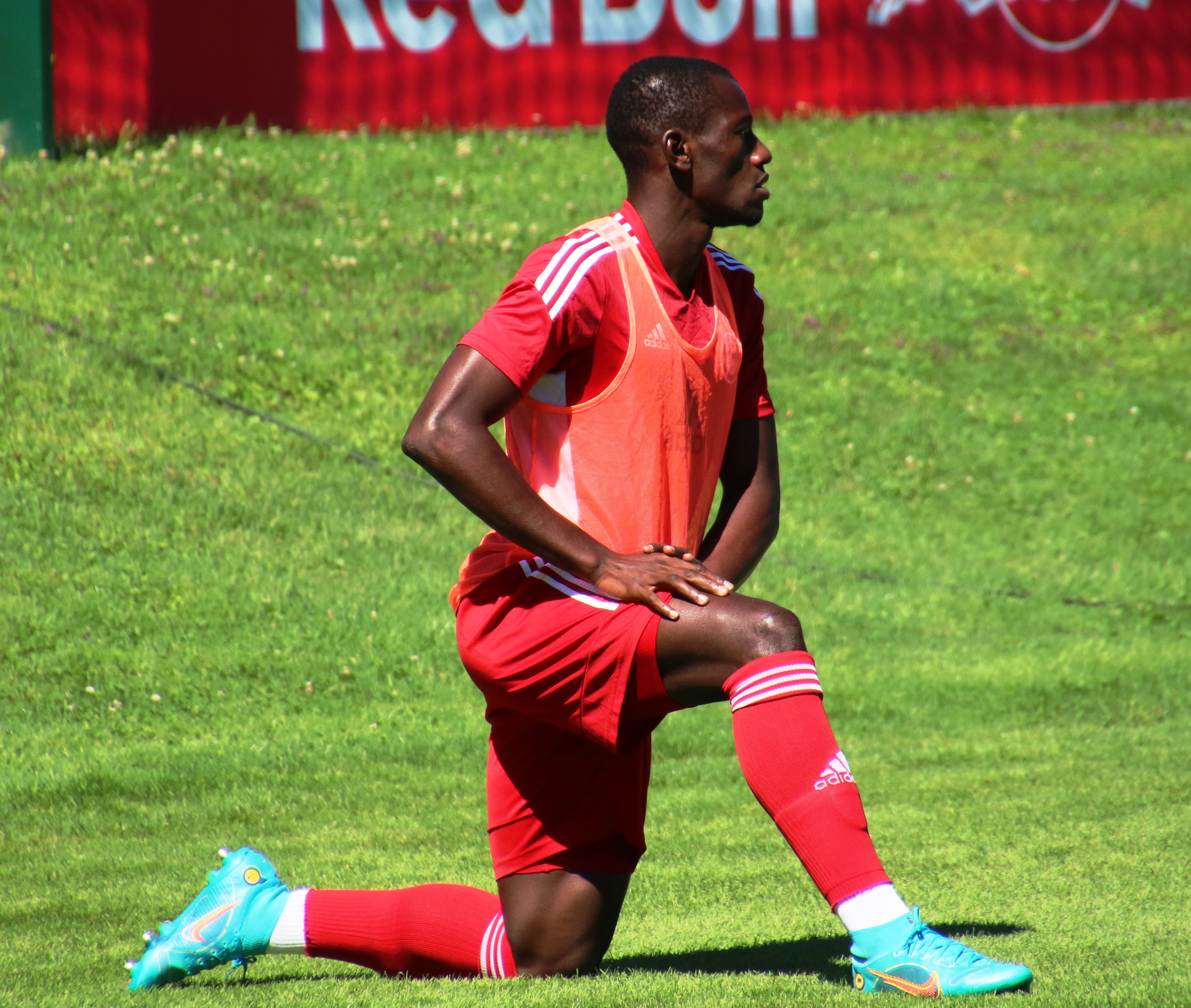
Mady Camara

- Algassime Bah – Olympiacos – 2021–2024
- Lass Bangoura – Lamia – 2022
- Sambégou Bangoura – Panserraikos – 2008–2009
- Abdoul Camara – PAOK – 2013
- Aguibou Camara – Olympiacos, Atromitos – 2021–2024
- Fodé Camara – Olympiacos – 2019
- Mady Camara – Olympiacos, PAOK – 2018–
- Mikael Dyrestam – Xanthi, Volos – 2019–2020, 2023–2024
- Mamadou Kané – Olympiacos – 2021–2022
- Ahmad Mendes Moreira – PAS Giannina – 2021–2023
- Abdoul Salam Sow – Skoda Xanthi – 1998–1999
- Issiaga Sylla – Asteras Tripolis – 2025–2026
- Jean Marie Sylla – Ergotelis, Kallithea, OFI, Apollon Kalamarias – 2003–2007
- Mohamed Sylla – Paniliakos – 1998–2000

=== Guinea-Bissau ===
- Zidane Banjaqui – Panserraikos – 2025–2026
- Mimito Biai – Panetolikos – 2019–2020
- Dálcio – Panetolikos, Ionikos – 2019–2022
- Ednilson – OFI – 2006–2007
- Esmaël Gonçalves – Veria – 2014
- Nanu – Iraklis – 2026–
- Toni Silva – Levadiakos – 2016–2018
- Zezinho – Veria, Levadiakos – 2013–2014, 2016–2017

=== Ivory Coast ===
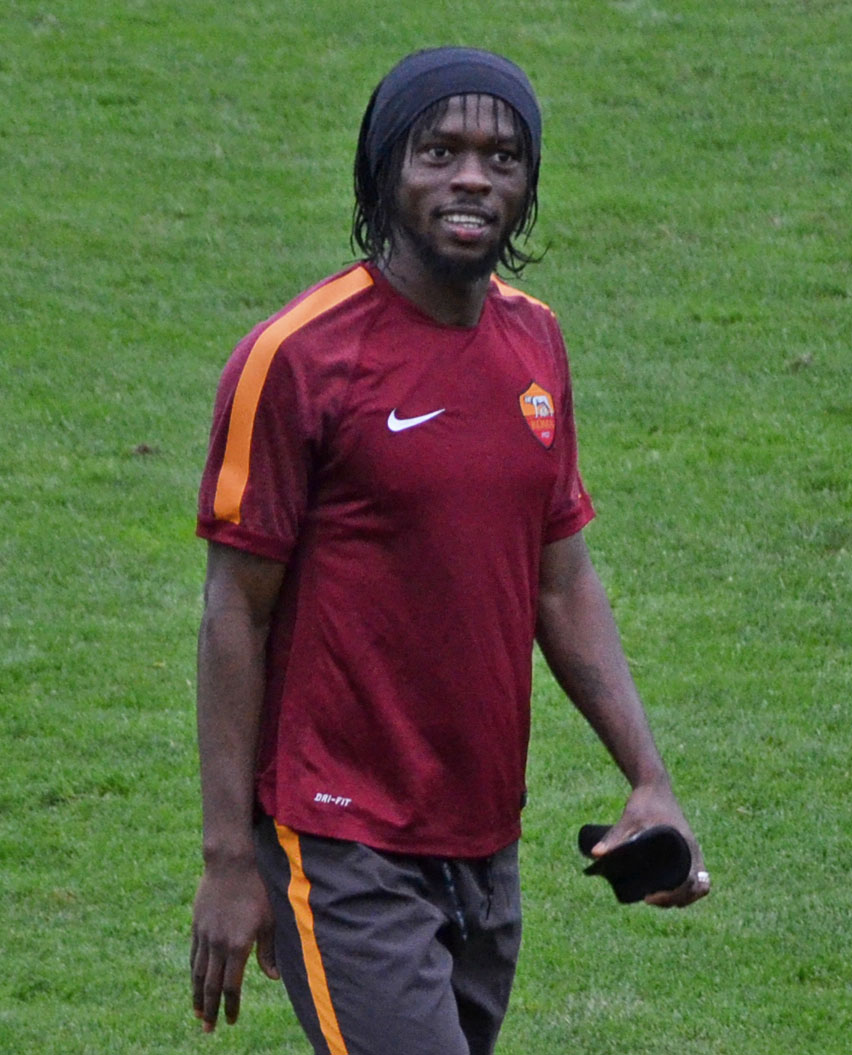
Gervinho

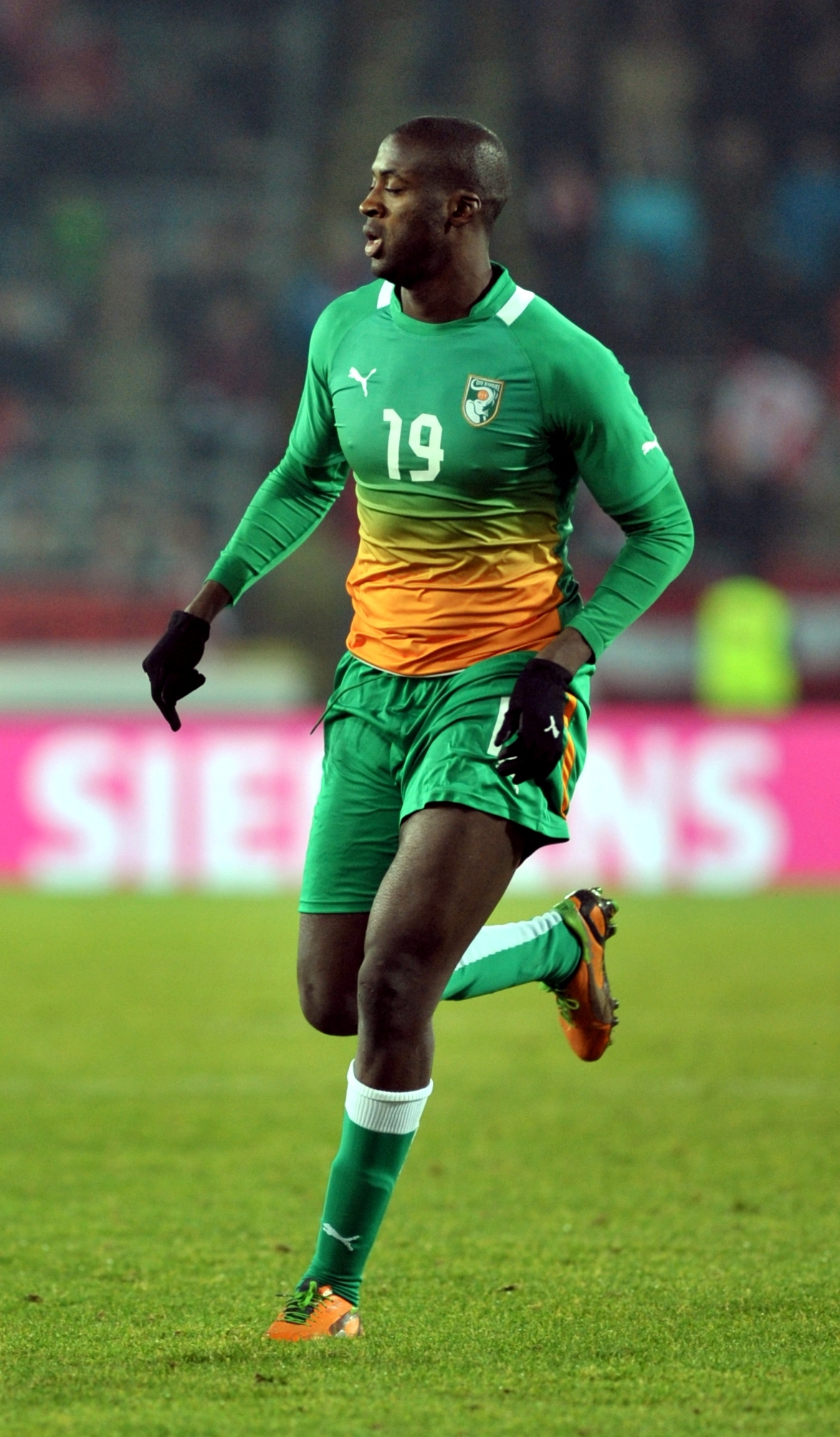
Yaya Touré

- Kanga Akalé – Panetolikos – 2012
- Lazare Amani – A.E. Kifisia – 2025–2026
- Benjamin Angoua – Levadiakos – 2019–2020
- Jean Luc Gbayara Assoubre – Lamia, AEL – 2019–2020
- Ibrahima Bakayoko – AEL, PAOK, PAS Giannina – 2007–2012
- Alain Behi – Kallithea – 2007–2012
- Nadrey Dago – Panetolikos – 2022–2023
- Simon Deli – Asteras Tripolis – 2024–2025
- Serge Dié – Iraklis, Kavala, Skoda Xanthi – 2008–2011, 2012–2014
- Gilles Domoraud – PAS Giannina, Panionios – 2003, 2004–2005
- Cheick Doukouré – Aris – 2022–2024
- Armand Dundee – Ethnikos Asteras – 2002–2003
- Hamed Kader Fofana – AEK Athens – 2025–2026
- Manssour Fofana – PAS Giannina – 2022–2023
- Gervinho – Aris – 2022–2023
- Steve Gohouri – Skoda Xanthi – 2013
- Cedric Gondo – Asteras Tripolis – 2016–2018
- Franck Manga Guela – Kerkyra, AEL, Apollon Smyrnis – 2006–2007, 2008–2009, 2013–2014
- Lossémy Karaboué – Levadiakos – 2016–2017
- Emmanuel Koné – Levadiakos, Apollon Smyrnis – 2013–2015, 2017–2019
- Ahmed Ouattara Kossonou – AEL – 2025–2026
- Christian Kouamé – Aris – 2026–
- Élie Kroupi – Levadiakos – 2008
- Alban Lafont – Panathinaikos – 2025–2026
- Abdoulaye Méïté – OFI – 2014–2015
- Marco Né – Olympiacos – 2006–2008
- Abdul Razak – OFI – 2014–2015
- Ibrahim Sissoko – Panathinaikos – 2012–2013
- Éric Tié Bi – Asteras Tripolis – 2014–2015
- Yaya Touré – Olympiacos – 2005–2006, 2018
- Dijilly Vouho – Lamia, OFI – 2017–2019
- Thierry Zahui – Levadiakos – 2011–2012
- Ben Zidane – Kalamata – 2026–
- Zito – Levadiakos – 2014–2015
- Marco Zoro – OFI – 2013–2014

=== Kenya ===
- Paul Were – AEL Kalloni – 2015–2016

=== Liberia ===
- Jamal Arago – Atromitos – 2012–2014
- Herron Berrian – Platanias – 2013–2014
- George Boe – Ionikos – 2007
- Robert Clarke – Athinaikos – 1998
- James Debbah – Iraklis – 1999–2001
- Francis Doe – Atromitos – 2005–2007
- George Gebro – Kerkyra – 2004–2005
- Thomas Kojo – Athinaikos – 1998
- Oliver Makor – Proodeftiki, Egaleo, Ionikos – 1999–2000, 2001–2007
- Joe Nagbe – PAOK, Panionios, PAS Giannina – 1997–2002
- Sekou Oliseh – PAOK – 2013–2014
- Isaac Pupo – Panionios – 2010–2011
- Zizi Roberts – Panionios, Olympiacos, Ionikos – 2000–2002
- Kelvin Sebwe – Skoda Xanthi, AEK Athens, Iraklis, Panachaiki – 1996–2001
- Christopher Wreh – AEK Athens – 1999

=== Madagascar ===
- Franck Rabarivony – Skoda Xanthi – 2002–2003
- Éric Rabésandratana – AEK Athens – 2001–2002

=== Malawi ===
- Tawonga Chimodzi – Platanias – 2015–2016

=== Mali ===
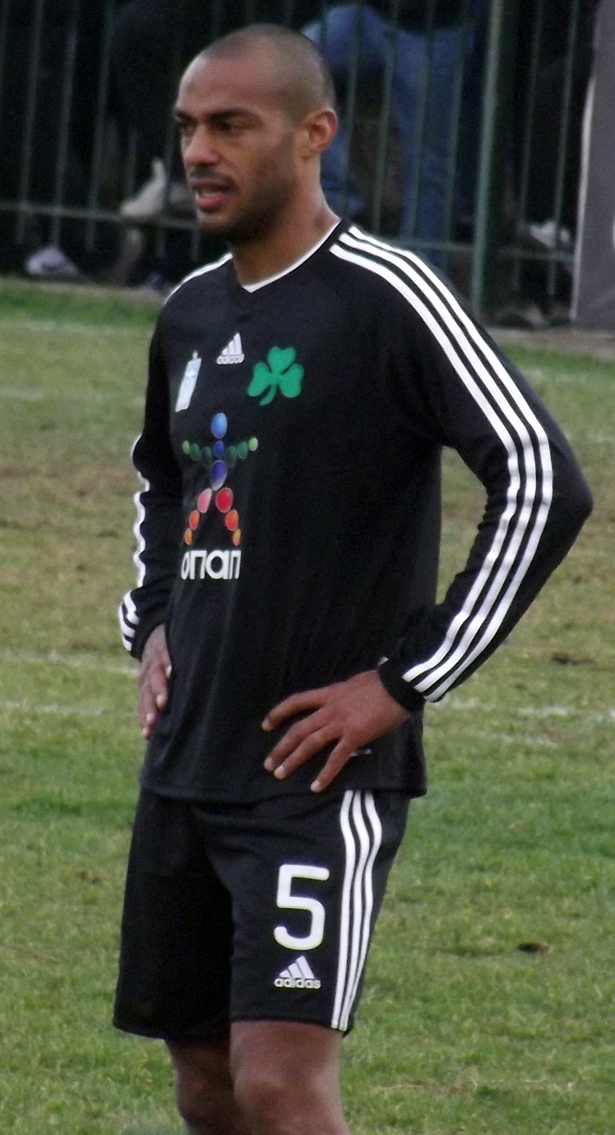
Cédric Kanté

- Mamadou Bagayoko – PAS Giannina – 2011–2012
- Sékou Berthé – Panionios – 2006–2009
- Ousmane Coulibaly – Platanias, Panathinaikos – 2014–2019
- Drissa Diakité – Olympiacos – 2012–2013
- Harouna Diarra – OFI – 1997–2000
- Mahamadou Diarra – OFI – 1998–1999
- Youba Diarra – Asteras Tripolis – 2023–2024
- Fousseni Diawara – Panionios – 2007–2010
- Nouha Dicko – OFI – 2022–2024
- Moussa Djenepo – Panetolikos – 2026–
- Saliou Guindo – Lamia – 2024–2025
- Cédric Kanté – Panathinaikos – 2009–2012
- Abdoulaye Keita – Panionios, Olympiacos – 2018–2019
- Cheick Oumar Konaté – A.E. Kifisia – 2026–
- Bakary Sako – Levadiakos – 2022–2023
- Diadie Samassékou – Olympiacos – 2022–2023
- Mahamadou Sidibé – Egaleo, Kerkyra, PAS Giannina – 2002–2008
- Yacouba Sylla – Panathinaikos – 2017
- Bassala Touré – Athinaikos, Kerkyra, Levadiakos – 2000–2001, 2004, 2005–2006, 2007–2009
- Sambou Yatabaré – Olympiacos – 2013–2016

=== Mauritania ===
- Adama Ba – Lamia – 2021
- Khassa Camara – Xanthi – 2016–2020
- Oumar Camara – Panionios – 2018–2020
- Aboubakar Kamara – Aris, Olympiacos – 2021–2023
- Aboubakary Koïta – AEK Athens – 2024–

=== Mauritius ===
- Lindsay Rose – Aris – 2019–2021, 2024–2026

=== Morocco ===
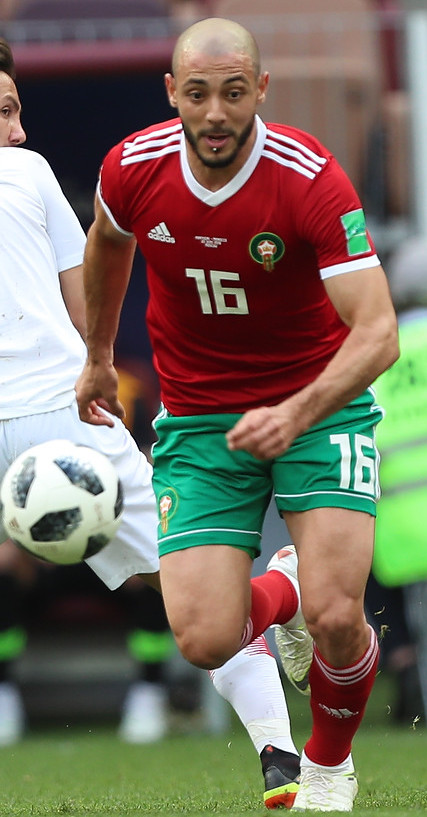
Nordin Amrabat

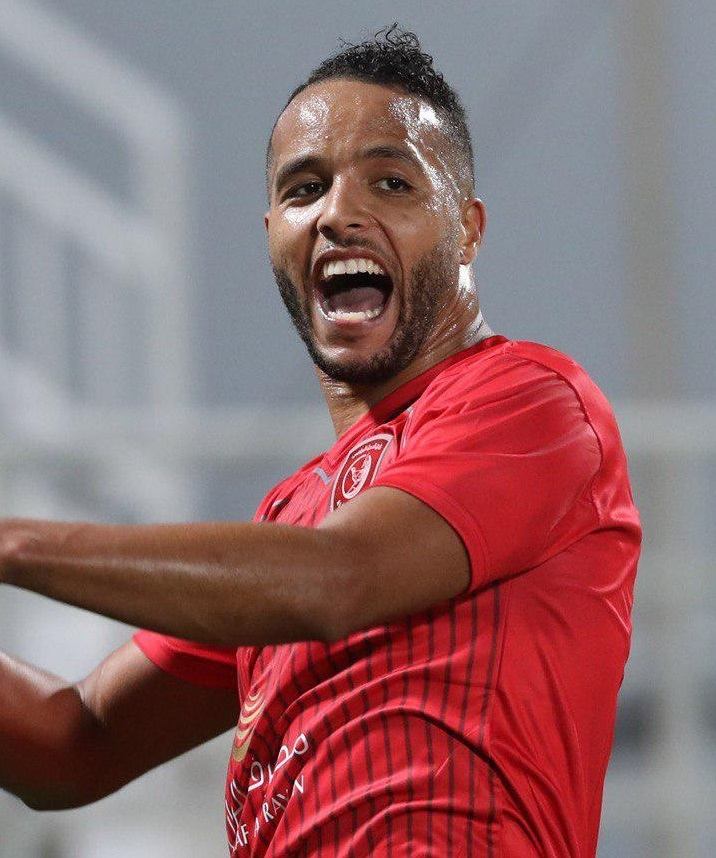
Youssef El-Arabi

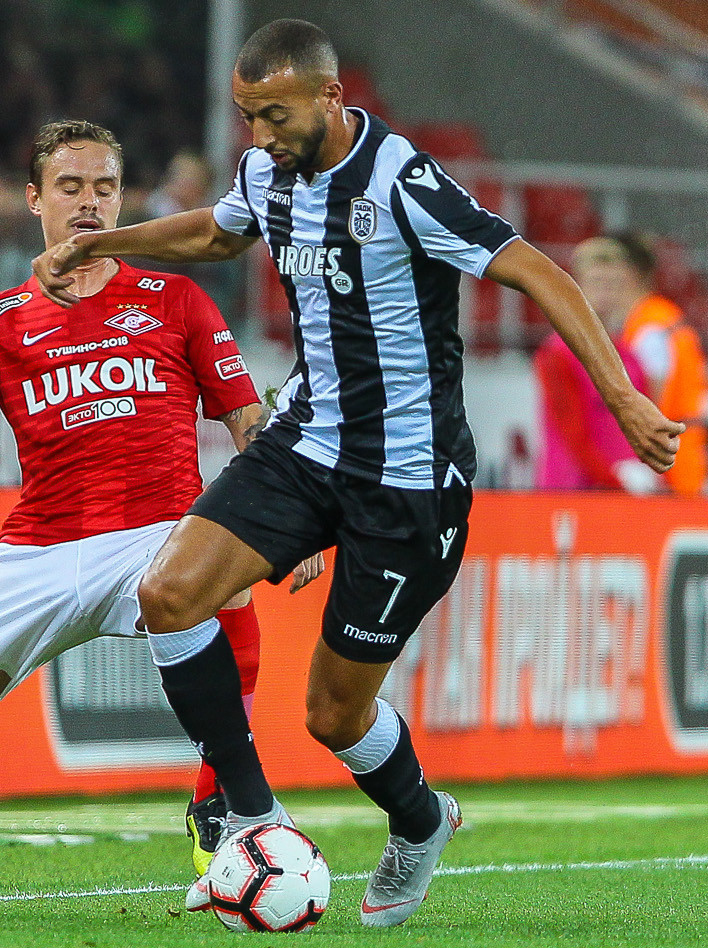
Omar El Kaddouri

- Yahia Attiyat Allah – Volos – 2019
- Nordin Amrabat – AEK Athens – 2021–2025
- Anuar – Panathinaikos – 2020
- Yassin Ayoub – Panathinaikos – 2020–2022
- Amine Bassi – Panetolikos – 2026–
- Salaheddine Bassir – Aris – 2002–2003
- Nabil Baha – AEK Athens – 2011
- Chahir Belghazouani – Levadiakos – 2015–2018
- Houssine Benali – Ethnikos Asteras, Panionios – 1999–2001
- Karim Benkouar – Panionios, OFI – 2001–2002
- Samir Boughanem – Kerkyra – 2004–2005
- Ouasim Bouy – Panathinaikos – 2014–2015
- Mehdi Carcela – Olympiacos – 2017–2018
- Mohammed Chakir – Skoda Xanthi, Ethnikos Asteras – 1998–2000
- Sofian Chakla – AEL, Iraklis – 2025, 2026–
- Saïd Chiba – Aris – 2001–2003
- Manuel da Costa – Olympiacos – 2015–2017
- Youssef El-Arabi – Olympiacos – 2019–2024
- Ayoub El Kaabi – Olympiacos – 2023–
- Omar El Kaddouri – PAOK – 2017–2023
- Talal El Karkouri – Aris – 2000–2001
- Ali El-Omari – Apollon Kalamarias – 2005–2006
- Nabil El Zhar – PAOK – 2010–2011
- Karim Fegrouche – PAS Giannina – 2011–2013
- Rachid Hamdani – Asteras Tripolis – 2015–2017
- Nabil Jaadi – Asteras Tripolis – 2018
- Yazid Kaïssi – Panionios – 2002
- Imrân Louza – Panathinaikos – 2026–
- Hachim Mastour – Lamia – 2018–2019
- Hamza Mendyl – Aris, Volos – 2025–
- Abdeslam Ouaddou – Olympiacos – 2006
- Abderrahim Ouakili – Skoda Xanthi – 2001–2003
- Azzedine Ounahi – Panathinaikos – 2024–2025, 2026–
- Adrien Regattin – Volos – 2021–2022
- Adil Rhaili – Apollon Smyrnis – 2020–2022
- Anass Salah-Eddine – Panathinaikos – 2026–
- Kahil Shaid – Ionikos – 2002–2003
- Tarik Tissoudali – PAOK – 2024–2025
- Jaouad Zairi – Asteras Tripolis, Olympiacos, PAS Giannina – 2007–2012
- Anass Zaroury – Panathinaikos – 2025–
- Monsef Zerka – Iraklis – 2011

=== Mozambique ===
- Clésio Baúque – Panetolikos – 2016–2018
- Simão Mate Junior – Panathinaikos – 2007–2012
- Manú – Panthrakikos – 2008–2009, 2010
- Paito – Skoda Xanthi – 2013–2014

=== Niger ===
- Moussa Yahaya – Trikala – 2000

=== Nigeria ===
A

- Olubayo Adefemi – Skoda Xanthi – 2010–2011
- Daniel Adejo – AEL Kalloni, Kerkyra, Lamia – 2014–2016, 2018–2024
- Adebayo Adeleye – Volos – 2025–2026
- Dele Adeleye – Ergotelis, OFI – 2014–2015
- Raymond Adeola – Asteras Tripolis – 2025–
- Mubaraq Adeshina – Asteras Tripolis – 2022–2025
- Victor Agali – Skoda Xanthi, Levadiakos – 2008–2010
- Abdul Jeleel Ajagun – Panathinaikos, Levadiakos – 2013–2016
- Oluwatobiloba Alagbe – Asteras Tripolis – 2019–2026
- Bala Ali – Panachaiki – 1991―1992
- Sudais Ali Baba – Asteras Tripolis – 2020–2022
- Thankgod Amaefule – PAOK – 2003–2005

B

- Haruna Babangida – Olympiacos – 2005–2007

C

- Chidi – Platanias – 2013
- Chioma Chimezie – Kavala – 1997–1998
- Macauley Chrisantus – AEK Athens, Lamia – 2015–2016, 2017
- Moses Cobnan – Levadiakos – 2026–

D

- Abiola Dauda – Atromitos, AEL, Panetolikos, Apollon Smyrnis – 2016–2018, 2019–2022
- George Datoru – Skoda Xanthi – 2004
- Tom Dele-Bashiru – Aris – 2026–
- Cyriel Dessers – Panathinaikos – 2025–

E

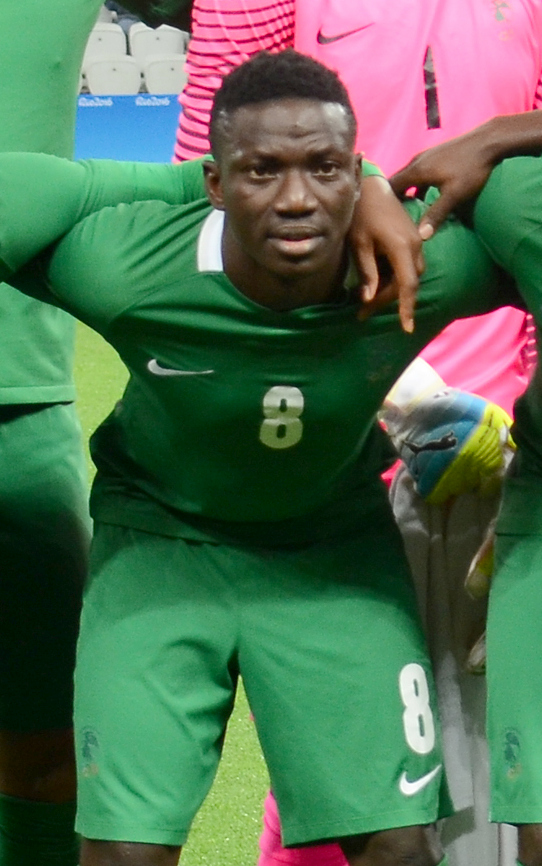
Peter Etebo

- Timipere Johnson Eboh – Asteras Tripolis, A.E. Kifisia – 2021–
- Bright Edomwonyi – Atromitos – 2021
- Emmanuel Ekwueme – Aris – 2004–2005
- Emmanuel Emenike – Olympiacos – 2017–2018
- Joseph Enakarhire – Panathinaikos – 2007–2008
- Bright Enobakhare – AEK Athens – 2020
- James Enuagwana – Kavala – 1998–1999
- Anderson Esiti – PAOK – 2019–2022
- Peter Etebo – Aris – 2022–2023

F

G

H

I

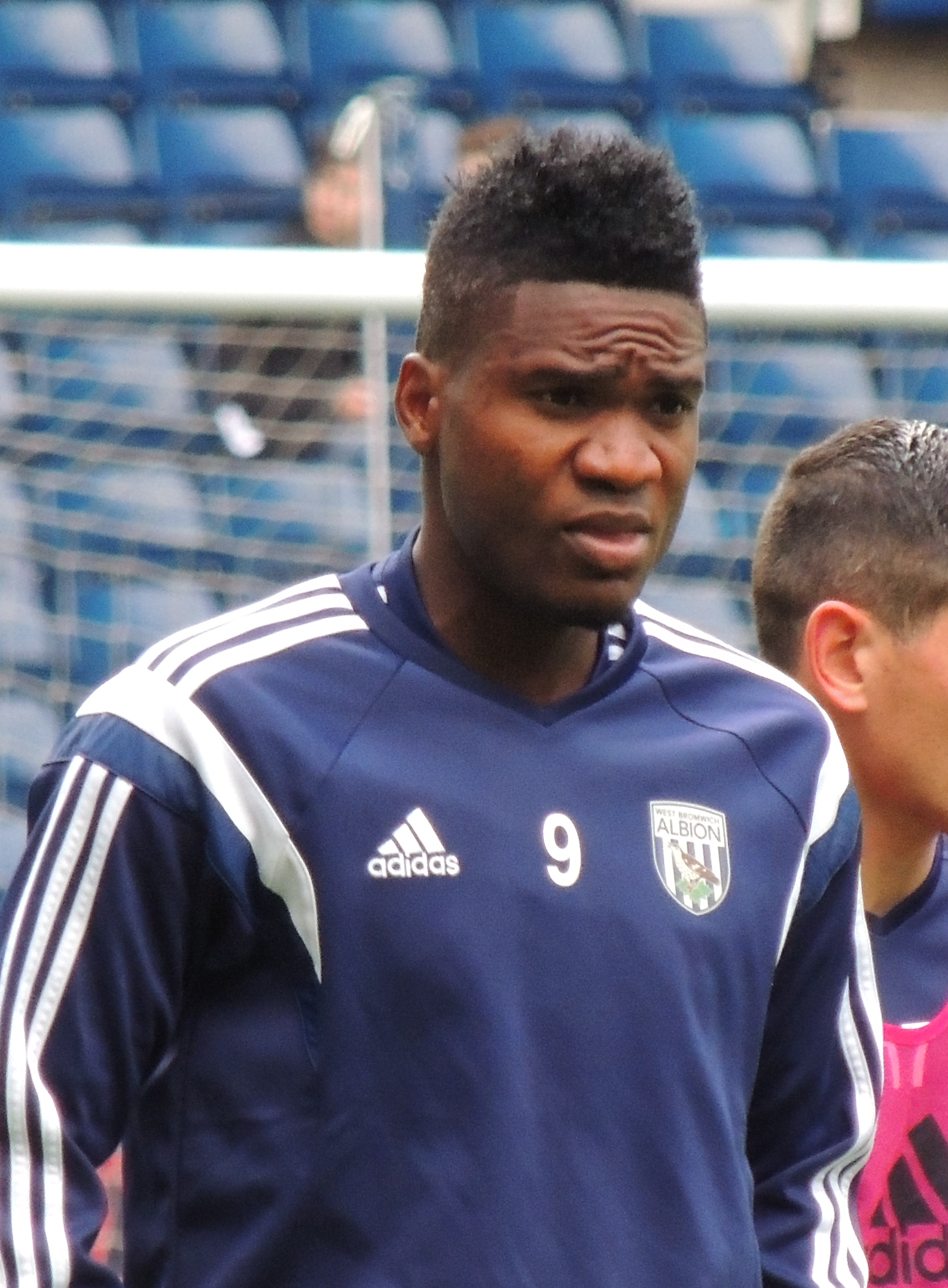
Brown Ideye

- John Ibeh – Aris – 2013
- Brown Ideye – Olympiacos, Aris – 2015–2017, 2019–2020
- Ernest Inneh – Korinthos – 1992–1993
- Jack Ipalibo – A.E. Kifisia – 2023–2024
- Furo Iyenemi – Akratitos – 2003

J

K

- Sani Kaita – Iraklis – 2011

L

- Garba Lawal – Iraklis – 2005–2006

M

- Stephen Makinwa – AEL – 2010–2011
- Jerry Mbakogu – Apollon Smyrnis – 2022

N

- David Nazim – Kerkyra – 2016–2017
- Afeez Nosiru – Panetolikos – 2023
- Joseph Nwafor – Paniliakos, OFI – 2003–2008

O

- Christian Obodo – Skoda Xanthi – 2014–2016
- Nwankwo Obiora – Levadiakos – 2016–2018
- Bartholomew Ogbeche – Kavala – 2010–2011
- Patrick Ogunsoto – Ergotelis – 2004–2005, 2008–2010
- Princewill Okachi – Panthrakikos – 2014
- Chidera Okoh – Asteras Tripolis – 2025–2026
- Emmanuel Okoye – Panionios – 2011–2014
- Michael Olaitan – Veria, Olympiacos, Ergotelis, Panionios – 2012–2017
- Egutu Oliseh – Panthrakikos, Ergotelis – 2008–2012
- Suleiman Omo – Egaleo, Panionios, Lamia, Levadiakos, Panserraikos – 2005–2007, 2009–2012, 2017–2019, 2020–2021
- Henry Onyekuru – Olympiacos – 2021–2022
- Bruno Onyemaechi – Olympiacos – 2025–
- Benjamin Onwuachi – Ionikos, Kavala, Panetolikos, Skoda Xanthi – 2006–2007, 2009–2011, 2012–2013
- Ifeanyi Onyilo – Kerkyra – 2017
- Dominic Okanu – Kallithea – 2004–2005
- Solomon Okpako – Panionios – 2010–2011
- Wilson Oruma – Kavala – 2009–2010
- Sam Otis – Iraklis – 1997―1998
- Amaechi Ottiji – Panachaiki, Ionikos – 1990―1997

P

Q

R

S

T

- William Troost-Ekong – PAOK – 2023–2024

U

- Cornelius Udebuluzor – Ionikos, Proodeftiki – 1998–2000
- Ifeanyi Udeze – Kavala, PAOK, AEK Athens – 1997–2008
- Chigozie Udoji – Asteras Tripolis, Platanias, Atromitos, Aris – 2009–2011, 2012–2014
- Ekerette Udom – Asteras Tripolis – 2025
- Jerry Ugen – Apollon Smyrnis – 1990
- Ugo Ukah – AEL Kalloni – 2015–2016
- Ehije Ukaki – Atromitos – 2026–

V

W

- Roland Warri – Panachaiki – 1992―1993

X

Y

- Rashidi Yekini – Olympiacos – 1994–1995

Z

=== Rwanda ===
- Fritz Emeran – Levadiakos – 2007–2009
- Edwin Ouon – Levadiakos – 2015–2017
- Hakim Sahabo – AEK Athens – 2026–

=== São Tomé and Príncipe ===
- Jordão Diogo – Panserraikos, Panthrakikos, Kerkyra, Levadiakos – 2010–2011, 2013–2015, 2016–2019

=== Senegal ===
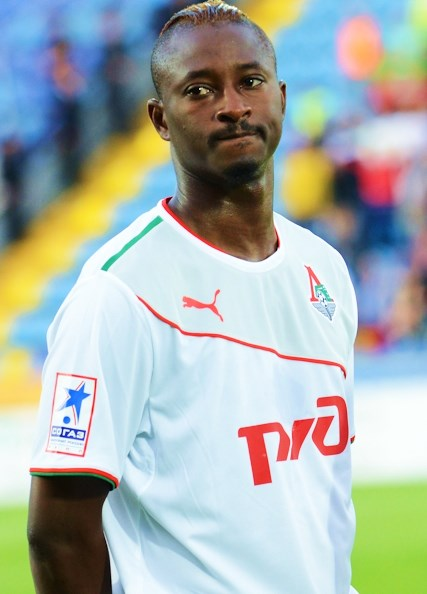
Dame N'Doye

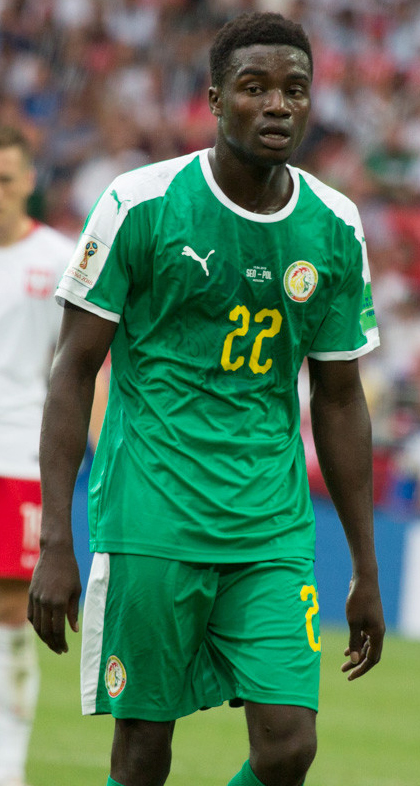
Moussa Wagué

- Ismail Ba – Skoda Xanthi, Aris – 1998–2004
- Ousseynou Ba – Olympiacos – 2019–2024
- Aliou Badji – Levadiakos – 2026–
- Youssouph Badji – Panetolikos – 2026–
- Henri Camara – Atromitos, Panetolikos, AEL Kalloni – 2010–2015
- Pape Abou Cissé – Olympiacos – 2017–2023
- Clayton Diandy – Aris – 2024–2026
- Djibril Diarra – Kalamata – 2026–
- Samba Lélé Diba – Athens Kallithea – 2024–2025
- Seny Dieng – Atromitos – 2026–
- Ousmane Diop – Skoda Xanthi, Egaleo – 1999–2002
- Papa Bouba Diop – AEK Athens – 2010–2011
- Pape Cheikh Diop – Aris – 2022–2023
- Tafsir Diop – Aris – 2026–
- El Hadji Diouf – AEK Athens – 2007–2011
- Assane Dioussé – OFI – 2022–2023
- Ricardo Faty – Aris – 2010–2012
- Mamadou Gning – Aris – 2025–
- Macoumba Kandji – Levadiakos – 2013–2014
- Abdoulaye Keita – Iraklis – 2004–2005
- Paul Keita – PAS Giannina, AEL Kalloni, Atromitos, Kerkyra – 2011–2017
- Mamadou Konaté – Skoda Xanthi – 1999–2000
- Pape M'Bow – Panthrakikos, Atromitos – 2013–2016
- Frédéric Mendy – Kavala – 2009–2010
- Jackson Mendy – Levadiakos – 2012–2013, 2016–2018
- Guirane N'Daw – Asteras Tripolis – 2013–2014
- Seyni N'Diaye – Kerkyra – 2004–2005
- Dame N'Doye – Panathinaikos, OFI – 2007–2009
- Badou Ndiaye – Aris – 2021–2022
- Cherif Ndiaye – PAOK – 2026–
- Mohamed Ndiaye – Levadiakos – 2026–
- Mor Ndiaye – Athens Kallithea – 2024–2025
- Cheikh Niasse – Panathinaikos – 2021
- Ibrahima Niasse – Levadiakos, Lamia – 2017–2018, 2020
- Pierre Sagna – Panetolikos – 2019–2020
- Massamba Sambou – Atromitos – 2010–2011
- Khalifa Sankaré – Olympiacos Volos, Aris, Asteras Tripolis – 2010–2016
- Younousse Sankharé – Panathinaikos – 2021
- Mohamed Sarr – OFI – 2012–2014
- Mouhamadou Seye – Panetolikos – 2011–2022
- Pape Habib Sow – Panathinaikos – 2012–2013
- Ibrahim Tall – AEL – 2010–2012
- Mame Baba Thiam – PAOK – 2016–2017
- Habibou Traoré – Panionios – 2006
- Moussa Wagué – PAOK, Panserraikos – 2020–2021, 2024–2026

=== Sierra Leone ===
- Aziz Deen-Conteh – Ergotelis – 2013–2014
- Mohamed Kallon – AEK Athens – 2008
- Alhassan Kamara – Panetolikos – 2018–2020
- John Kamara – Apollon Smyrnis – 2012–2014
- Jonathan Morsay – Panetolikos – 2021–2023
- Kabba Samura – OFI – 2005–2006

=== South Africa ===
- Ethan Brooks – Panserraikos – 2025–2026
- Thomas Hlongwane – Olympiacos, Ionikos – 1987–1988, 1989–1990
- Pierre Issa – OFI, Ionikos – 2005–2009
- Bongani Khumalo – PAOK – 2012–2013
- Sam Magalefa – Aris – 2003–2004
- Lovers Mohlala – Aris – 2004
- Lehlogonolo Masalesa – AEL – 2017
- Clement Mazibuko – Ergotelis – 2005
- Zane Moosa – Ionikos – 1989–1990
- Pitso Mosimane – Ionikos – 1989–1991, 1992–1993, 1994–1995
- Nasief Morris – Aris, Panathinaikos – 2001–2008
- Bryce Moon – Panathinaikos, PAOK – 2008–2010
- Bernard Parker – Panserraikos – 2011
- Patrick Phungwayo – Panionios – 2010
- Andrew Rabutla – PAOK – 1997–1998
- Christos Retsos – Panionios – 2019–2020
- Glen Salmon – PAOK – 2007–2008
- Dillon Sheppard – Panionios – 2005–2006

=== Tanzania ===
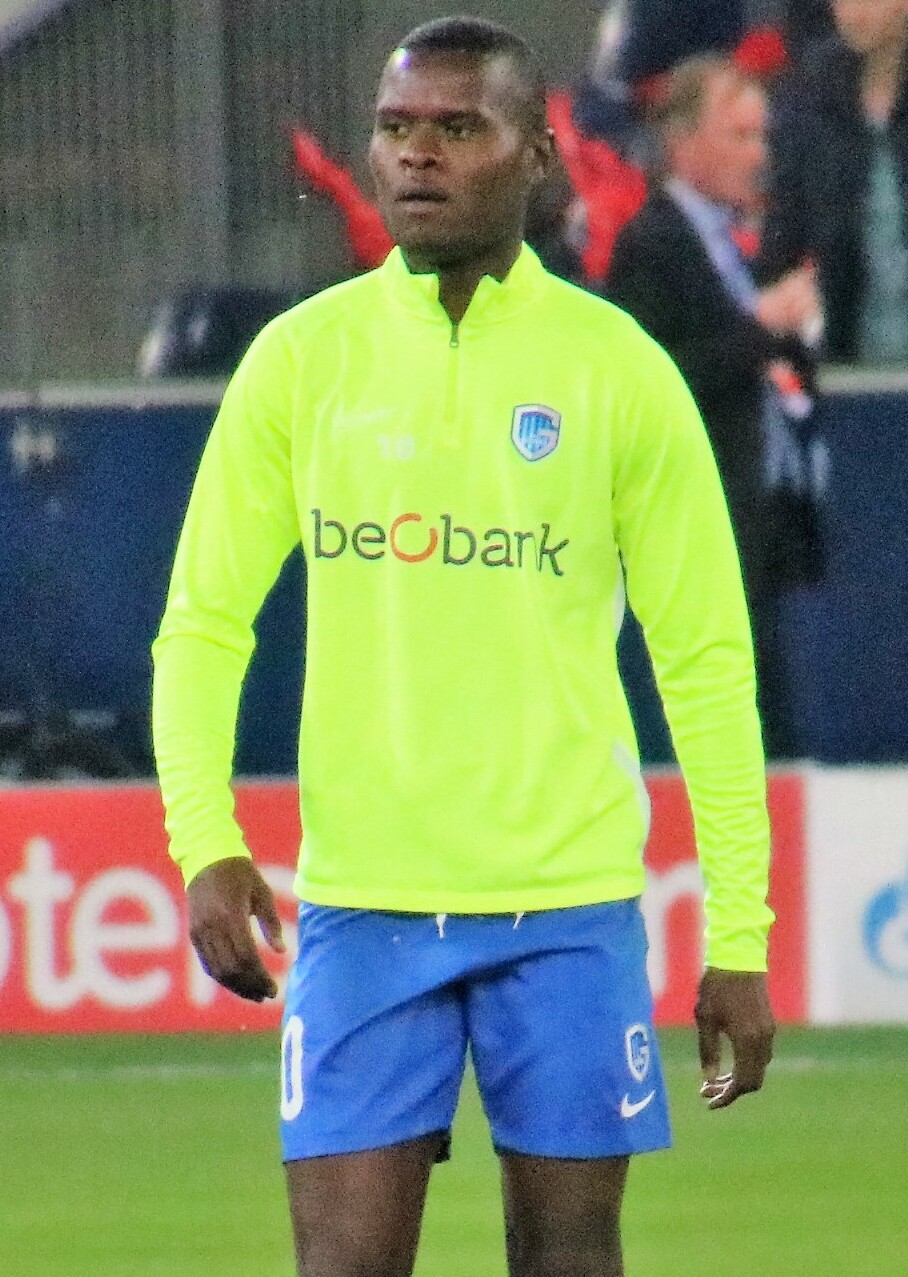
Mbwana Samatta

- Mbwana Samatta – PAOK – 2023–2025

=== The Gambia ===
- Omar Colley – PAOK – 2024–2025
- Lamarana Jallow – Levadiakos – 2024–
- Njogu Demba-Nyrén – Aris, Panathinaikos, Kerkyra – 2002–2005
- Mustapha Ndaw – Veria – 2008
- Edrissa Sonko – Skoda Xanthi – 2007
- Noah Sonko Sundberg – Aris – 2025–

=== Togo ===
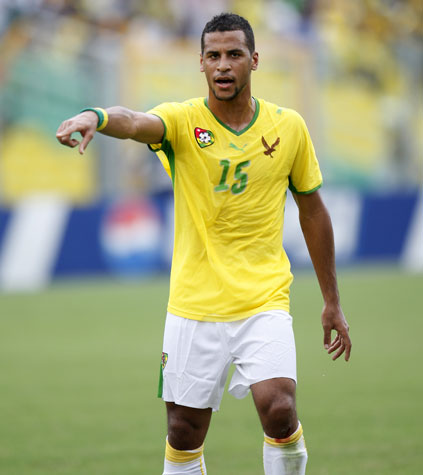
Alaixys Romao

- Paul Adado – Panserraikos – 2008–2009
- Mathieu Dossevi – Olympiacos – 2014–2015
- Alaixys Romao – Olympiacos, Ionikos, Athens Kallithea – 2016–2018, 2021–2023, 2024–2025

=== Tunisia ===
- Yohan Benalouane – Aris – 2020–2022
- Tijani Belaïd – Veria – 2017
- Änis Ben-Hatira – AEL – 2021
- Anis Boussaïdi – PAOK – 2010–2011
- Selim Ben Djemia – Lamia – 2018
- Mohamed Dräger – Olympiacos – 2020–2021
- Nassim Hnid – AEK Athens – 2020–2022
- Wajdi Kechrida – Atromitos – 2022–2024
- Nabil Makni – Volos – 2025–2026
- Yassine Meriah – Olympiacos – 2018–2020
- Mehdi Nafti – Aris – 2009–2011
- Nabil Taïder – Skoda Xanthi – 2008–2009
- Hamza Younés – Skoda Xanthi, Aris – 2016–2017, 2018–2019

=== Uganda ===
- Alex Kakuba – PAS Giannina – 2018–2019

=== Zambia ===
- Kings Kangwa – Panathinaikos – 2026–
- Christopher Katongo – Skoda Xanthi – 2010–2011
- Rodgers Kola – Veria – 2015–2016
- Ashious Melu – Apollon Kalamarias, Olympiacos – 1989–1990

=== Zimbabwe ===
- Tino Kadewere – Aris – 2025–
- Kennedy Nagoli – Aris, PAS Giannina – 1997–2003
- Marvelous Nakamba – Panetolikos – 2026–
- Zenzo Moyo – Chalkidona – 2005
- Lincoln Zvasiya – OFI – 2013–2014

== Asia (AFC) ==
=== Australia ===
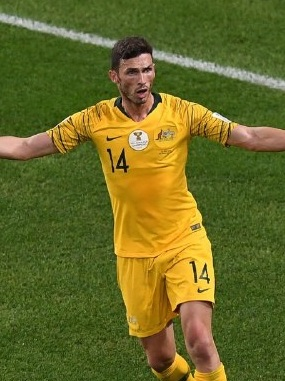
Apostolos Giannou

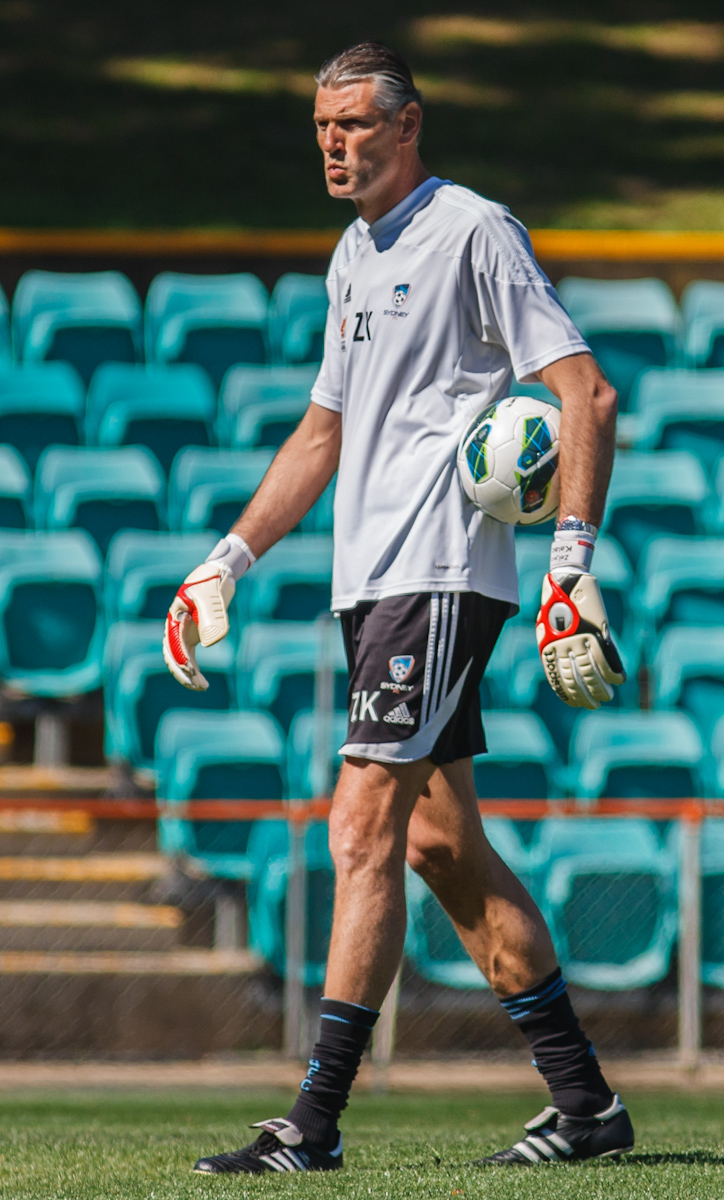
Zeljko Kalac

- John Anastasiadis – PAOK – 1988–1997
- Terry Antonis – PAOK, Veria – 2015–2017
- Panos Armenakas – Panathinaikos – 2019–2020
- Joe Bacak – Ethnikos Asteras – 2000–2001
- Dimosthenis Batalis – AEK Athens – 1988–1990
- Dean Bouzanis – Aris – 2013
- Kerem Bulut – Iraklis – 2015–2016
- Nathan Burns – AEK Athens – 2008–2012
- Pablo Cardozo – Athinaikos – 2000
- Alvin Ceccoli – AEK Athens – 1999
- Georgios Chaniotis – Apollon Athens – 1989–1990
- Louis Christodoulou – Panathinaikos – 1987–1997
- George Christopoulos – AEK Athens – 1984
- Ante Covic – PAOK, Kavala – 1999–2001
- Jason Davidson – Panserraikos – 2024–2025
- Travis Dodd – Panionios – 2004–2005
- Adam Foti – Kerkyra – 2007–2008
- Apostolos Giannou – Apollon Kalamarias, Kavala, PAOK, Panionios, Asteras Tripolis, OFI – 2007–2016, 2020–2022
- Steven Havales – Levadiakos – 2024–
- James Jeggo – Aris – 2020–2022
- Mario Jermen – PAOK – 1998–1999
- Zeljko Kalac – Kavala – 2009–2010
- Bruce Kamau – OFI – 2021–2023
- Peter Katholos – AEL – 1985–1986
- Chris Kalantzis – Olympiacos, Panathinaikos – 1987–1997
- Youshaa Knaj – Panserraikos – 2024–2026
- Ulysses Kokkinos – Panathinaikos, Panserraikos – 1968–1969, 1970, 1972–1973
- Billy Konstantinidis – Veria – 2016–2017
- Theo Markelis – Veria – 2014–2015
- Peter Makrillos – Panionios – 2018–2019
- Peter Michorl – Atromitos – 2024–2026
- Craig Moore – Kavala – 2010
- Sasa Ognenovski – Panachaiki – 2002–2003
- Terry Palapanis – Xanthi – 1996–1998
- Joe Palatsides – Apollon Kalamarias, PAOK – 1994–1997
- Jim Patikas – AEK Athens, Athinaikos – 1985–1994
- Jason Polak – Panathinaikos – 1989–1990
- Steve Refenes – Olympiacos, Panionios – 1992–1996
- Tony Spyridakos – Pierikos – 1991–1992
- Apostolos Stamatelopoulos – PAS Giannina – 2022–2023
- Robert Stambolziev – Panathinaikos, Niki Volos – 2009–2010, 2014–2015
- Tony Stojkovski – Panserraikos – 2026
- Dimitri Valkanis – AEK Athens – 2025–2026
- Michael Valkanis – Iraklis – 1996
- Andrew Vlahos – Panathinaikos – 1998–1999
- Charlie Yankos – PAOK – 1988–1989

=== Hong Kong ===
- Alen Bajkuša – Egaleo – 2001–2002

=== Indonesia ===
- Bagus Kahfi – Asteras Tripolis – 2022–2023

=== Iran ===
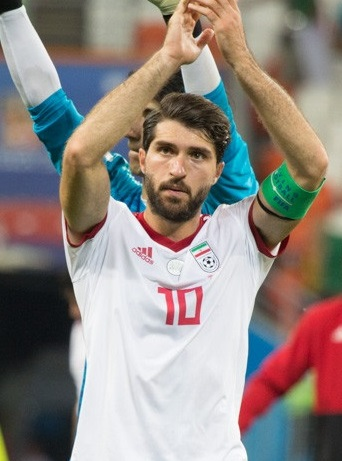
Karim Ansarifard

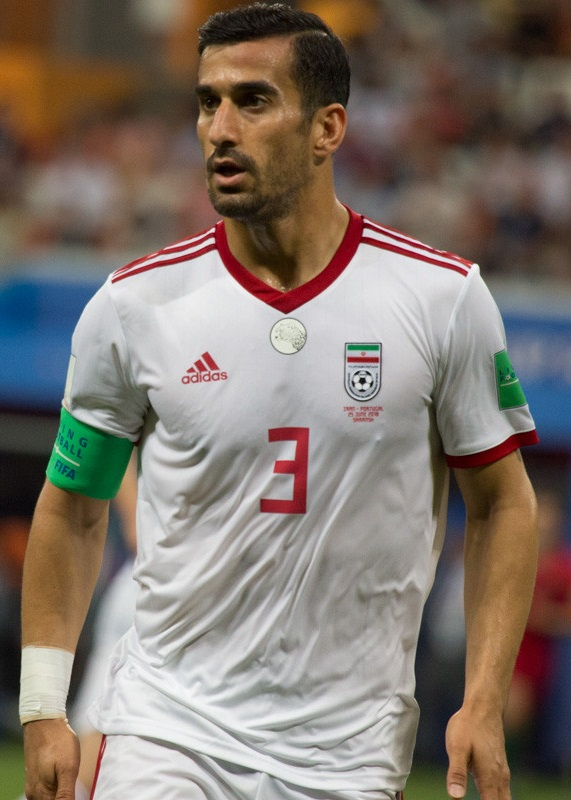
Ehsan Hajsafi

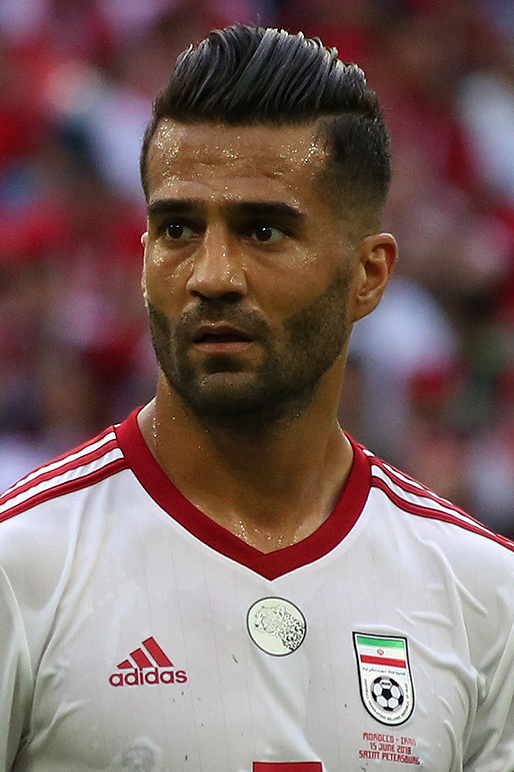
Masoud Shojaei

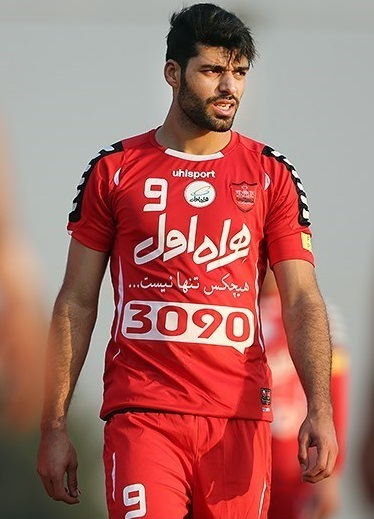
Mehdi Taremi

- Karim Ansarifard – Panionios, Olympiacos, AEK Athens, Aris – 2016–2018, 2020–2022, 2024
- Mohammad Reza Azadi – Panetolikos – 2021–2022
- Ehsan Hajsafi – Panionios, Olympiacos, AEK Athens – 2016–2018, 2021–2025
- Gholamhossein Hashempour – AEL – 1983–1984
- Alireza Mansourian – Skoda Xanthi, Apollon Athens – 1998–2000
- Milad Mohammadi – AEK Athens – 2021–2024
- Nima Nakisa – Kavala – 1999–2000
- Masoud Shojaei – Panionios, AEK Athens – 2016–2018
- Mehdi Taremi – Olympiacos – 2025–2026

=== Iraq ===
- Mohanad Ali – Aris – 2021–2022

=== Japan ===
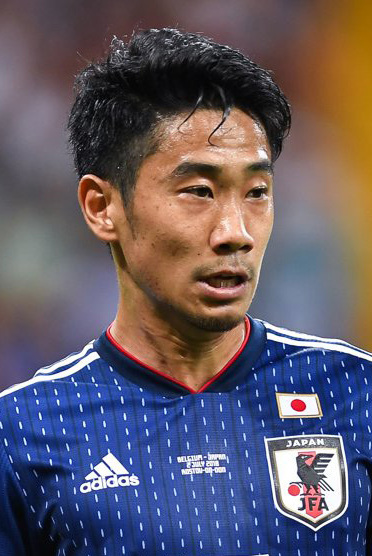
Shinji Kagawa

- Shinji Kagawa – PAOK – 2021
- Yōhei Kajiyama – Panathinaikos – 2013
- Daigo Kobayashi – Iraklis – 2010
- Daisuke Sakata – Aris – 2011

=== Jordan ===
- Odai Al-Saify – Skoda Xanthi – 2009–2010
- Angelos Chanti – Ergotelis, Iraklis – 2010–2012, 2013–2016

=== Lebanon ===
- Hilal El-Helwe – Apollon Smyrnis – 2018–2019
- Daniel Lajud – Panetolikos – 2024–2025
- Wael Nazha – Kavala – 1999–2000

=== Palestine ===
- Roberto Kettlun – Skoda Xanthi – 2003–2004
- Ibrahim Mughrabi – AEK Athens – 1962–1963
- Saado Abdel Salam – Platanias – 2016–2018

=== Saudi Arabia ===
- Samer Al-Mohaimeed – OFI – 2022–2024
- Mohammed Al-Rashidi – Panserraikos – 2024–2025
- Amiri Kurdi – Panionios – 2009–2014, 2018–2019

=== Singapore ===
- Fandi Ahmad – OFI – 1989–1990

=== South Korea ===
- Hwang In-beom – Olympiacos – 2022–2023
- Hwang Ui-jo – Olympiacos – 2022–2023

=== Syria ===
- Mohammad Nasser Afash – Ionikos, Proodeftiki – 1993–2004
- Khaled Al Zaher – Proodeftiki, Chalkidona, Thrasyvoulos – 1998–2006
- Aias Aosman – Ionikos – 2021–2023
- Said Bayazid – Proodeftiki, Akratitos – 1999–2004
- Nader Jokhdar – Proodftiki – 1998
- Ahmed Kurdughli – Proodftiki – 1999–2000
- Abdul Rahman Oues – Platanias, OFI, Volos – 2017–2023

=== Uzbekistan ===
- Stepan Atayan – Proodeftiki – 1997–1999
- Jafar Irismetov – Panathinaikos – 1997–1998
- Abdukahhor Marifaliev – PAOK – 1998
- Jaloliddin Masharipov – Panserraikos – 2023–2024

== Europe (UEFA) ==
=== Albania ===
A

- Serxhio Abdurahmani – AEK Athens – 2010–2011
- Astrit Ajdarević – AEK Athens – 2016–2018
- Fatjon Andoni – AEL, Apollon Smyrnis – 2016–2022
- Anesti Arapi – Iraklis – 1991–1992
- Arben Arbëri – PAS Giannina – 1990–1991

B

- Adrian Barbullushi – Ionikos – 1992–1995
- Emiliano Barka – Apollon Kalamarias – 2004–2005
- Migjen Basha – Aris – 2018–2019
- Vullnet Basha – Ionikos – 2021–2022
- Arjan Bellaj – PAS Giannina, Kalamata, Apollon Smyrnis, Ethnikos Piraeus, Panionios, Kerkyra – 1992–2007
- Lulzim Bershemi – Panionios – 1989–1992
- Arjan Beqaj – OFI, Ionikos – 1997–2006
- Efstrat Billa – Atromitos, Akratitos – 2003–2004, 2005–2006
- Alban Bushi – Apollon Kalamarias – 2006–2008

C

- Enis Çokaj – Panathinaikos, Asteras Tripolis, Levadiakos – 2022–2026
- Emiliano Cukani – Paniliakos – 1995
- Armando Cungu – Ethnikos Piraeus – 1998

D

- Edmond Dalipi – Apollon Athens, Trikala – 1999–2000
- Astrit Deliu – Panionios – 2002
- Sulejman Demollari – Panionios – 1994–1996
- Arbër Dhrami – Platanias – 2011–2013
- Endrit Drenova – Chalkidona – 2003–2005

E

F

- Alfred Ferko – Panachaiki – 1991–1994
- Elton Fikaj – Panathinaikos – 2024–2026
- Indrit Fortuzi – Apollon Athens, Iraklis – 1998–2000, 2005–2007
- Leandro Frroku – Panathinaikos, Asteras Tripolis – 2022–

G

- Enea Gaqollari – Skoda Xanthi – 2011–2014
- Gabriel Geka – Kavala – 1995
- Klodian Gino – Olympiacos, Apollon Smyrnis – 2014, 2018–2020
- Nikola Gino – Athinaikos – 1996–1998
- Julian Gjeloshi – Proodeftiki – 2003
- Damian Gjini – Panionios – 2014–2015
- Armir Grimaj – Ethnikos Piraeus – 1998–1999
- Mario Gurma – Levadiakos – 2005–2006

H

- Altin Haxhi – Panachaiki, Iraklis, Apollon Kalamarias, Ergotelis – 1996–1998, 2000–2003, 2004–2005, 2006–2007
- Deivid Hoxha – Panetolikos – 2025–2026
- Elton Hoxha – Atromitos – 2025–
- Gertin Hoxhalli – AEL – 2015–2019
- Jahmir Hyka – Olympiacos, Panionios – 2007, 2010–2011

I

- Roland Iljadhi – Panachaiki – 1991–1994

J

- Dejvid Janaqi – Apollon Smyrnis – 2022–2023
- Mirel Josa – Aris, Kavala – 1991–1995

K

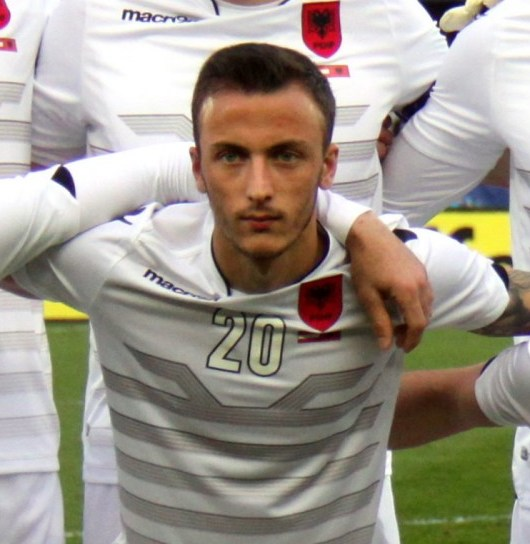
Ergys Kaçe

- Salvador Kaçaj – Athinaikos – 1992–1994
- Ergys Kaçe – PAOK, Panathinaikos, Aris, Volos – 2010–2021, 2023
- Emiliano Karaj – Aris – 2025–2026
- Renild Kasemi – Levadiakos – 2023, 2024–2026
- Elton Koça – Kallithea – 2001–2002
- Bledar Kola – Apollon Athens, Panathinaikos, AEK Athens, Kallithea – 1994–2004
- Enea Koliçi – Iraklis – 2006–2009
- Ervis Kraja – Iraklis – 2006–2007
- Kristian Kushta – PAOK, Iraklis – 2015–2019, 2026–
- Sokol Kushta – Iraklis, Apollon Kalamarias – 1991–1993

L

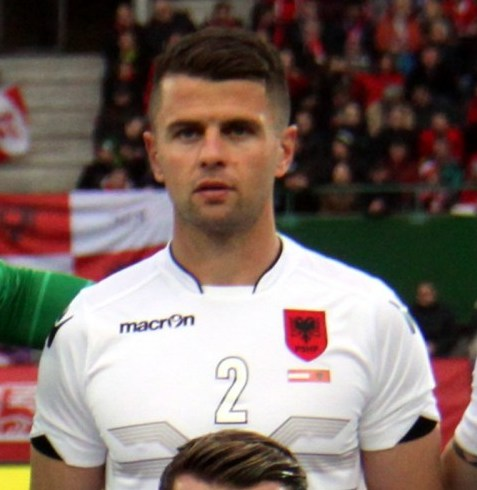
Andi Lila

- Qazim Laçi – Olympiacos, Levadiakos – 2017
- Diamanti Legisi – Volos – 2025–
- Artur Lekbello – Aris – 1991–1998
- Andi Lila – Iraklis, PAS Giannina – 2007, 2011–2019
- Klidman Lilo – Panathinaikos, OFI – 2024–

M

- Flosard Malçi – Lamia – 2023–2024
- Mërgim Mavraj – Aris – 2018
- Neti Meçe – Niki Volos – 2014–2015
- Antonio Miço – Panionios – 2018–2020
- Enea Mihaj – Panetolikos, PAOK – 2017–2022
- Lefter Millo – AEL, Iraklis – 1991–1997
- Mario Mitaj – AEK Athens – 2020–2022
- Edvin Murati – Iraklis – 2002–2006
- Gjergji Muzaka – Iraklis – 2004–2005

N

- Altin Ndrita – Apollon Athens – 1998

O

P

- Ledio Pano – Skoda Xanthi, Panelefsiniakos, PAS Giannina – 1992–1998, 1999–2000
- Armando Përlleshi – Ionikos – 2022
- Stavros Pilios – PAS Giannina, AEK Athens – 2020–
- Erind Prifti – AEL – 2010–2013

Q

- Kristi Qose – PAOK – 2013–2014

R

- Andi Renja – Aris – 2010–2014
- Kristian Rroku – Ionikos – 2020–2022
- Simon Rrumbullaku – PAS Giannina, Panetolikos, Apollon Smyrnis – 2012–2016

S

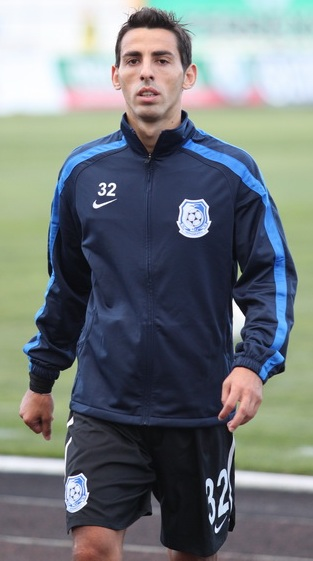
Kristi Vangjeli

- Hamdi Salihi – Panionios – 2004–2005
- Ermis Selimaj – PAOK – 2023–2025
- Leonard Senka – Levadiakos – 2016–2017
- Arian Sheta – Kallithea – 2004–2005
- Aidon Shehu – Panathinaikos – 2026–
- Ylli Shehu – Apollon Athens – 1993
- Bledi Shkëmbi – Ethnikos Asteras – 2001
- Vasil Shkurti – Panionios, Niki Volos, Asteras Tripolis, Skoda Xanthi – 2010–2011, 2014–2016
- Ilir Shulku – Apollon Athens – 1997
- Alberto Simoni – Lamia – 2024–2025
- Foto Strakosha – PAS Giannina, Ethnikos Piraeus, Olympiacos, Panionios, Ionikos, Kallithea, Ethnikos Asteras, Proodeftiki – 1991–2005
- Thomas Strakosha – AEK Athens – 2024–

T

- Sergej Tica – Paniliakos – 1999–2000
- Marjus Topi – Levadiakos – 2015–2017

U

V

- Kristi Vangjeli – Aris – 2003–2011, 2013–2014
- Pavli Vangjeli – PAOK – 2003–2004
- Aleksandër Vasi – Xanthi – 1992–1994
- Emiljano Vila – PAS Giannina – 2011–2014

W

X

- Arjan Xhumba – Kalamata, Iraklis, PAS Giannina – 1995–1998, 2000–2001, 2002–2003

Y

Z

- Roland Zajmi – Proodeftiki – 1997–2000, 2002–2004
- Renato Ziko – Platanias – 2016–2018
- Vasillaq Ziu – Ethnikos Piraeus – 1991–1995

=== Armenia ===
- Gaël Andonian – Veria – 2017
- André Calisir – Apollon Smyrnis – 2021
- Ara Evdokimov – Kastoria – 1997
- Gevorg Ghazaryan – Olympiacos, Kerkyra, Lamia – 2014–2015, 2021
- Zhora Hovhannisyan – Olympiacos, Egaleo – 2004–2005
- Arman Karamyan – Panachaiki – 2003
- Artavazd Karamyan – Panachaiki – 2003
- Romik Khachatryan – OFI – 2004–2006
- Marcos Pizzelli – Xanthi – 2017
- Yervand Sukiasyan – Kavala, Iraklis – 1996–1998
- Nair Tiknizyan – Olympiacos – 2026–

=== Austria ===
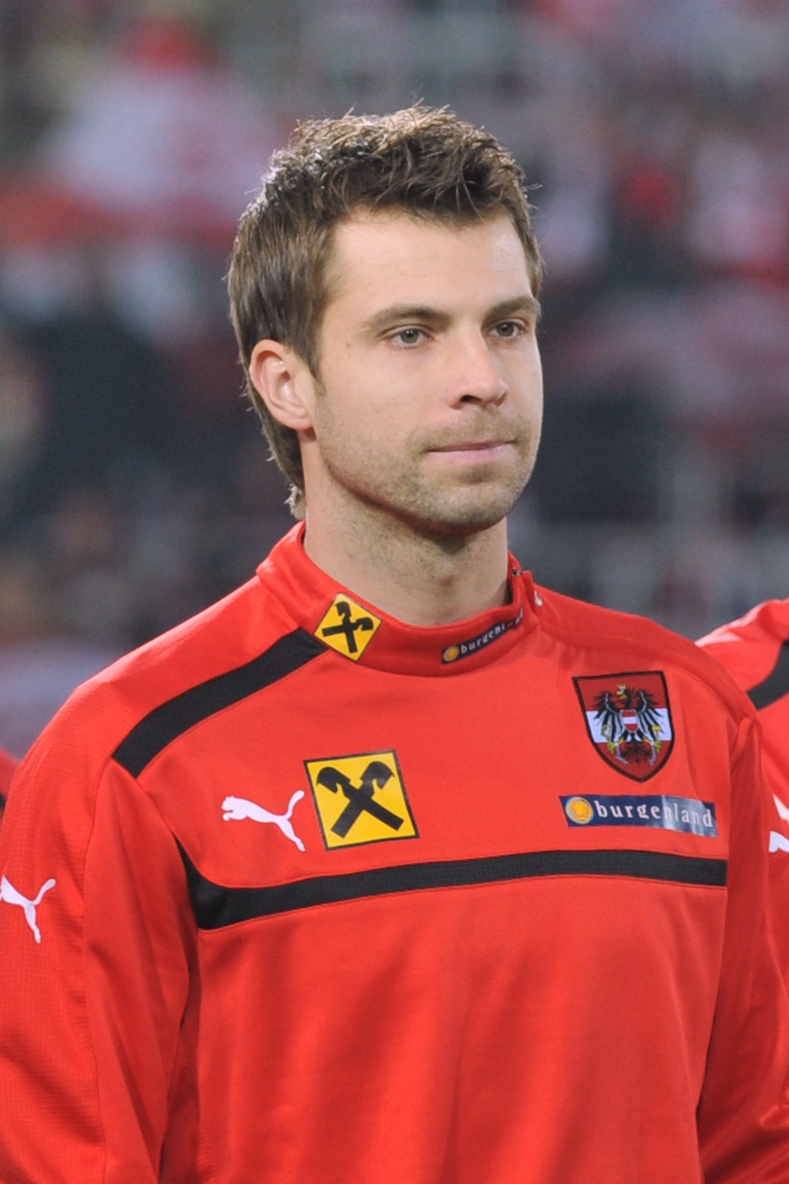
Andreas Ivanschitz

- Gerald Bacher – Iraklis – 1997–1998
- Dietmar Berchtold – PAOK, Apollon Athens – 1998–1999
- Dietmar Constantini – Kavala – 1981–1982
- Fabian Ehmann – Aris – 2019–2020
- Willy Fitz – Panathinaikos –
- Günter Friesenbichler – Skoda Xanthi, Egaleo – 2002–2005
- Herbert Gager – Skoda Xanthi – 2000–2002
- Michael Gspurning – Skoda Xanthi, PAOK, Platanias – 2007–2012, 2014–2015
- Mario Hieblinger – Ergotelis – 2006–2012
- Alfred Hörtnagl – Kavala – 1994–1996
- Andreas Ivanschitz – Panathinaikos – 2006–2011
- Volkan Kahraman – Skoda Xanthi – 2004–2005
- Helmut Kirisits – Panathinaikos, OFI – 1979–1984
- Christopher Knett – Panetolikos – 2019–2021
- Marco Krainz – Iraklis – 2026–
- Andreas Kuen – Atromitos – 2022–2024
- Sanel Kuljić – AEL – 2011
- Enrico Kulovits – Skoda Xanthi – 2004
- Andreas Lasnik – Panionios – 2013–2014
- Jürgen Leitner – Skoda Xanthi – 2001–2003
- Andreas Lipa – Skoda Xanthi – 2002–2003
- Jürgen Macho – AEK Athens, Panionios – 2007–2009, 2010–2013
- Armin Mujakic – Atromitos – 2018–2019
- Thomas Murg – PAOK – 2020–
- Peter Persidis – Olympiacos – 1971–1975
- Gernot Plassnegger – Ergotelis – 2008–2009
- Miroslav Polak – Panionios – 1987–1988
- Gilbert Prilasnig – Aris – 2001–2002
- Patrick Salomon – Atromitos – 2020–2022
- Emanuel Šakić – Atromitos, Aris, Ionikos, A.E. Kifisia – 2018–2019, 2020–2023
- Stefan Schwab – PAOK – 2020–2025
- Srđan Spiridonović – Panionios, Atromitos – 2017–2019, 2021–2022
- Cican Stanković – AEK Athens – 2021–2025
- Roman Wallner – Apollon Kalamarias, Skoda Xanthi – 2008–2009
- Kurt Welzl – Olympiacos – 1984

=== Azerbaijan ===
- Araz Abdullayev – Panionios – 2012
- Amir Agayev – Atromitos – 2020–2021
- Amit Guluzade – AEL – 2017
- Anatoli Ponomarev – Skoda Xanthi – 2003

=== Belarus ===
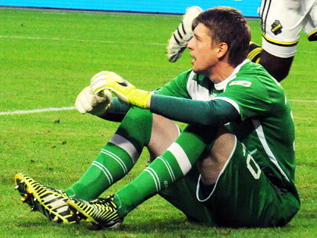
Andrey Gorbunov

- Ilya Aleksiyevich – Panetolikos – 2016
- Dmitry Baga – Atromitos – 2016–2017
- Artyom Bykov – Lamia – 2024–2025
- Andrey Gorbunov – Atromitos – 2014–2017
- Vital Hayduchyk – Asteras Tripolis – 2017
- Oleg Klimov – Iraklis – 1995
- Oleg Korol – Iraklis – 1995
- Pavel Plaskonny – Panionios – 2008
- Aleksandr Pavlovets – Lamia – 2023–2024
- Yevgeniy Shikavka – AEL – 2019
- Mikalay Signevich – Platanias – 2017
- Sergey Veremko – Levadiakos – 2015–2016
- Vitali Zhaludok – Platanias – 2012–2014

=== Belgium ===
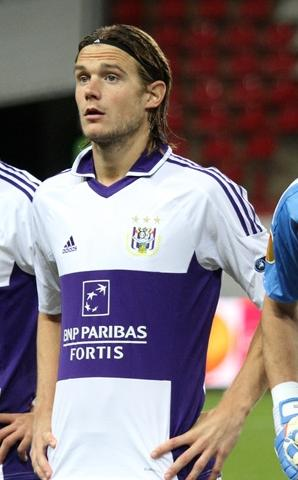
Guillaume Gillet

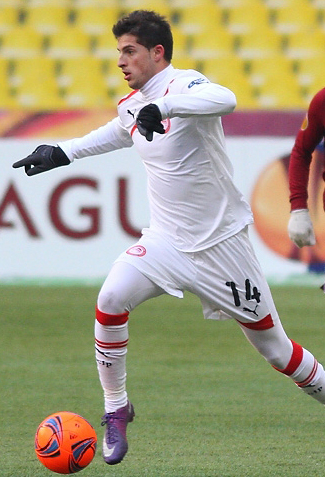
Kevin Mirallas

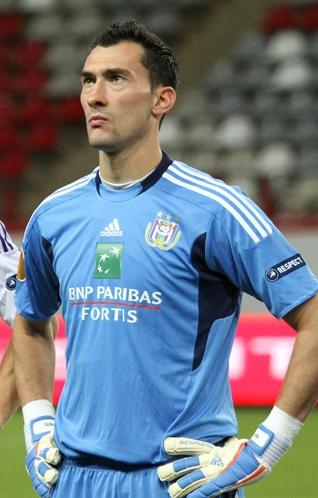
Silvio Proto

- Naïm Aarab – AEL – 2008–2012
- Ziguy Badibanga – Ergotelis, Asteras Tripolis – 2013–2015
- Laurent Ballenghien – Paniliakos – 1996–1997
- Roberto Bisconti – Panthrakikos – 2008
- Othmane Boussaid – Aris – 2026–
- Fangio Buyse – Athinaikos – 2000–2001
- Wouter Corstjens – Panetolikos – 2015–2016
- Hugo Cuypers – Olympiacos – 2020–2021
- Laurens De Bock – Atromitos – 2022–2024
- Stéphane Demol – Panionios – 1995
- Tuur Dierckx – Atromitos – 2023–2024
- Björn Engels – Olympiacos – 2017–2018
- Noah Fadiga – Aris – 2025–
- Loïc Alvarez Fernandez – OFI – 2025
- Guillaume Gillet – Olympiacos – 2017–2018
- David Henen – Olympiacos – 2014–2015
- Jonas Ivens – Niki Volos – 2014–2015
- Aaron Leya Iseka – OFI – 2024, 2026–
- Nordin Jbari – Aris – 2001
- Denzel Jubitana – Atromitos – 2023–
- Ritchie Kitoko – Asteras Tripolis, Apollon Smyrnis – 2014–2016, 2020–2021
- Viktor Klonaridis – AEK Athens, Panathinaikos, Atromitos, A.E. Kifisia, Lamia – 2010–2012, 2013–2016, 2017–2020, 2022–2023, 2024, 2025
- Erwin Lemmens – Olympiacos – 2005–2006
- Maarten Martens – PAOK – 2014–2015
- Tim Matthys – Panathinaikos – 2009
- Kevin Mirallas – Olympiacos – 2010–2012, 2017–2018
- Mbo Mpenza – AEL – 2007–2008
- Rob Nizet – Iraklis – 2026–
- Julien Ngoy – AEL – 2026
- Vadis Odjidja-Ofoe – Olympiacos – 2017–2018
- Stéphane Oméonga – Panserraikos – 2025–2026
- Marvin Peersman – PAS Giannina, Aris – 2020–2023
- Tristan Peersman – OFI – 2007–2008
- Silvio Proto – Olympiacos – 2017–2018
- Marino Sabbadini – Athinaikos – 1996–1997
- Fabrice Silvagni – Aris – 1996–1997
- Serge Sironval – Ethnikos Asteras – 2000–2001
- Jimmy Smet – Iraklis – 2000–2001
- Sven Vandenbroeck – Akratitos – 2005
- Jude Vandelannoite – Athinaikos, Kerkyra – 2000–2001, 2004–2005
- Davino Verhulst – Apollon Smyrnis – 2020–2022
- Birger Verstraete – Aris – 2023–2024
- Yevgeny Yablonsky – Asteras Tripolis – 2024–
- Mikael Yourassowsky – Kerkyra, Skoda Xanthi – 2006–2009

=== Bosnia and Herzegovina ===
A

- Adi Adilović – Panthrakikos – 2012–2013

B

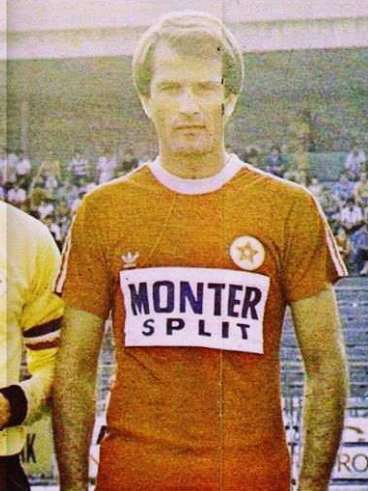
Dušan Bajević

- Edin Bahtić – Aris – 1985–1987
- Dušan Bajević – AEK Athens – 1977–1981
- Cvijetin Blagojević – Egaleo – 1983–1984
- Bernard Barnjak – Apollon Athens, Paniliakos – 1994–1998
- Aleksandar Bratić – Iraklis – 1999–2000
- Dženis Burnić – Volos – 2026–
- Azer Bušuladžić – Atromitos – 2017–2019, 2020

C

- Jasmin Čeliković – Panetolikos – 2024–
- Gojko Cimirot – PAOK – 2015–2018
- Edin Cocalić – Panionios, Panetolikos – 2010–2012, 2021

D

- Haris Dilaver – Platanias – 2016–2017
- Samir Duro – PAS Giannina – 2003

E

- Predrag Erak – Iraklis, Apollon Athens, Aris – 1991–2000

F

- Mladen Furtula – PAOK – 1975–1984

G

- Siniša Gagula – OFI – 2008–2009
- Željko Gavrilović – Paniliakos – 2000–2001
- Dragan Glogovac – Apollon Athens – 1998
- Ognjen Gnjatić – Platanias – 2015–2017

H

- Izet Hajrović – Aris – 2021–2023
- Said Hamulić – Volos – 2025–
- Mirko Hrgović – Kavala – 2010–2011

I

J

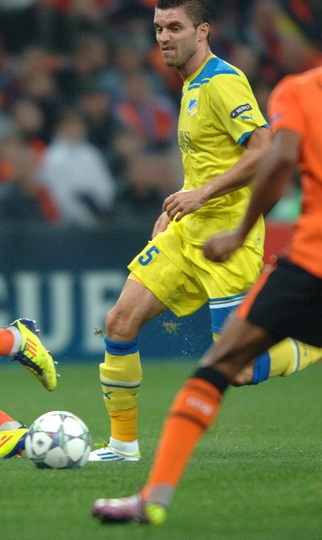
Sanel Jahić

- Sanel Jahić – Aris, AEK Athens, Levadiakos – 2008–2011, 2015–2016
- Stipe Jurić – Levadiakos – 2025–2026
- Davorin Juričić – Panionios, Apollon Athens, Apollon Kalamarias – 1986–1990

K

- Saša Kajkut – Kerkyra, Veria – 2014–2016
- Slobodan Karalić – Ethnikos Piraeus – 1984–1987
- Semir Kerla – Panserraikos – 2011
- Kenan Kodro – OFI – 2026–
- Elvir Koljić – Iraklis – 2026–
- Abid Kovačević – Ethnikos Piraeus – 1981–1984
- Petar Kunić – AEL – 2018–2019

L

- Mario Lamesic – OFI – 2009

M

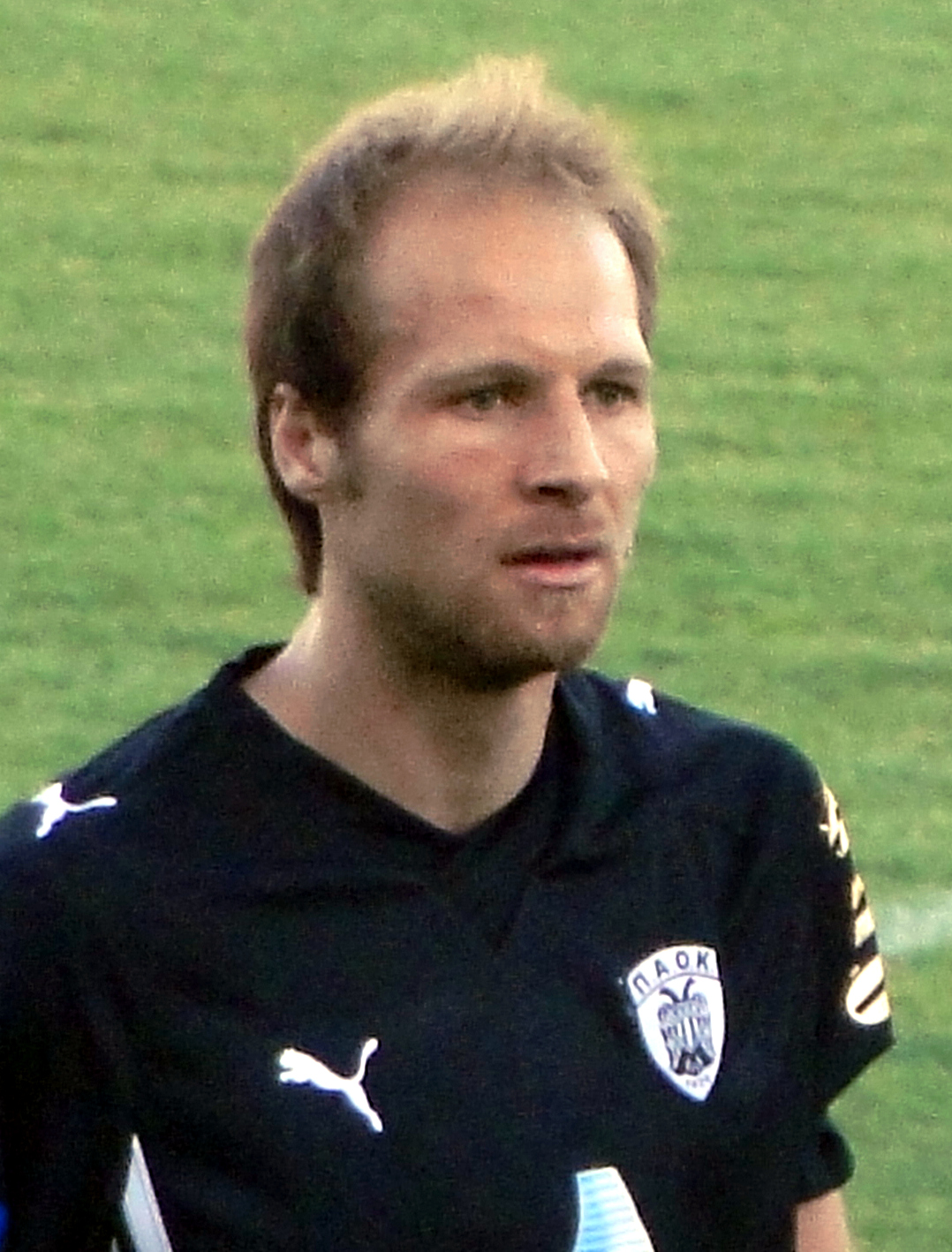
Zlatan Muslimović

- Aidin Mahmutović – Panionios – 2017
- Bojan Marković – Panserraikos – 2011
- Darko Mavrak – Panachaiki – 1997–1998
- Nedim Mekić – Lamia – 2024
- Marko Mihojević – PAOK, OFI – 2018–2020
- Ninoslav Milenković – Panserraikos – 2008–2009
- Ivan Milićević – A.E. Kifisia – 2024
- Dušan Mijić – Kavala – 1994–1996
- Fikret Mujkić – Panathinaikos – 1975–1976
- Fuad Mulahasanović – Aris – 1981–1982
- Zlatan Muslimović – PAOK – 2008–2011

N

- Zlatan Nalić – Panathinaikos – 1993
- Darko Nestorović – Panserraikos – 1991–1992
- Branislav Nikić – Kerkyra – 2016–2017
- Nikola Nikić – Egaleo, Aris, PAOK – 1985–1988
- Nemanja Nikolić – Olympiacos, Athens Kallithea – 2019–2023, 2024–2025
- Slobo Novakovic – Ethnikos Asteras – 1998

O

P

- Rade Paprica – PAOK – 1984–1986
- Srđan Pecelj – Paniliakos – 2000–2001
- Kenan Pirić – Atromitos – 2021
- Dejan Pravica – Panachaiki – 2001–2002
- Velibor Pudar – Apollon Athens – 1992–1993
- Denijal Purkovic – Paniliakos – 1998

Q

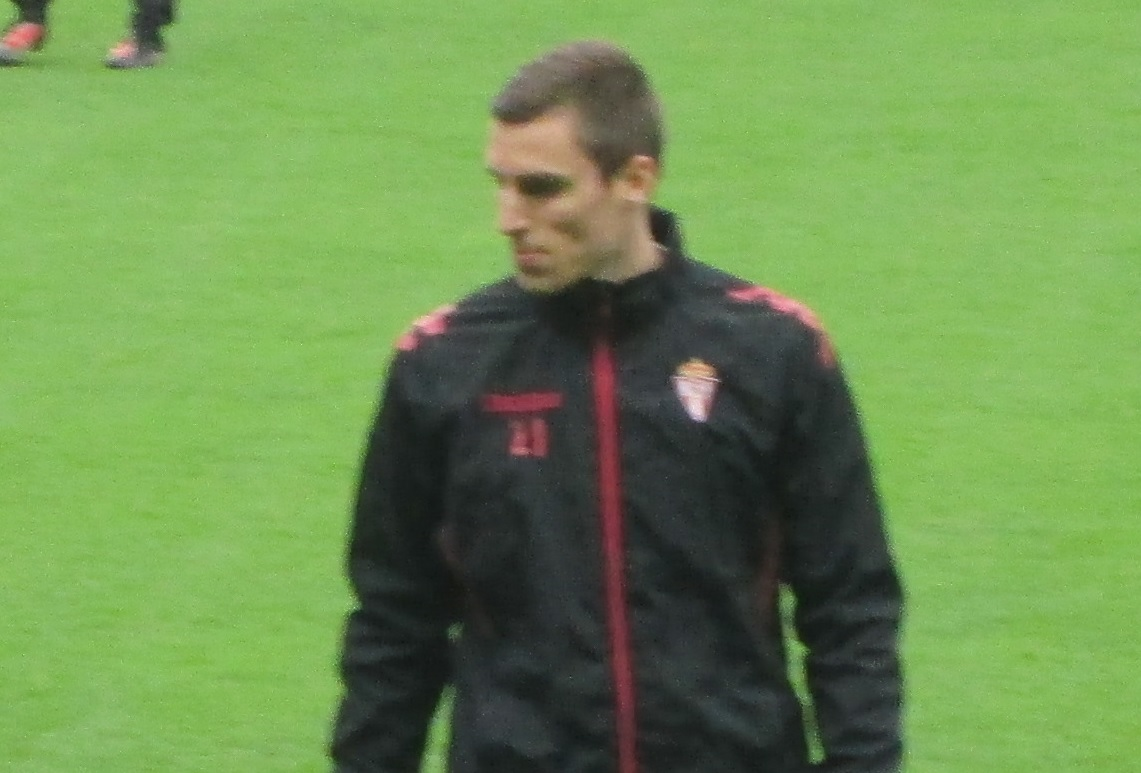
Ognjen Vranješ

R

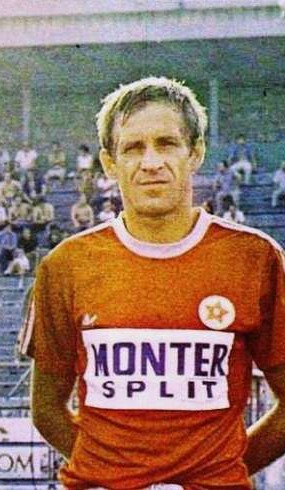
Franjo Vladić

- Vedad Radonja – AEK Athens, Lamia – 2020–2025
- Ajdin Redžić – Asteras Tripolis – 2024–2025

S

- Anel Šabanadžović – AEK Athens – 2019–2024
- Refik Šabanadžović – AEK Athens, Olympiacos – 1991–1998
- Zoran Šaraba – Panelefsiniakos, Kavala – 1998–2000
- Adnan Šećerović – AEL – 2019–2020
- Redzo Sehic – Panserraikos – 1981–1984
- Miloš Šestić – Olympiacos – 1984–1986
- Vladimir Skočajić – Apollon Kalamarias – 1983–1985
- Damir Špica – Athinaikos – 1991–1995

T

- Tomislav Tomić – Xanthi – 2015–2016

U

V

- Mirza Varešanović – Olympiacos – 1996–1998
- Jasminko Velić – OFI – 1992–1995
- Franjo Vladić – AEK Athens – 1979–1981
- Ognjen Vranješ – AEK Athens – 2016–2018, 2019–2020, 2021–2022

W

X

Y

Z

- Ervin Zukanović – Asteras Tripolis – 2022–2024

=== Bulgaria ===
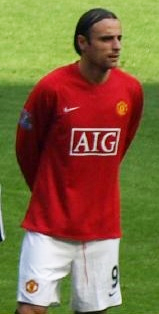
Dimitar Berbatov

A

B

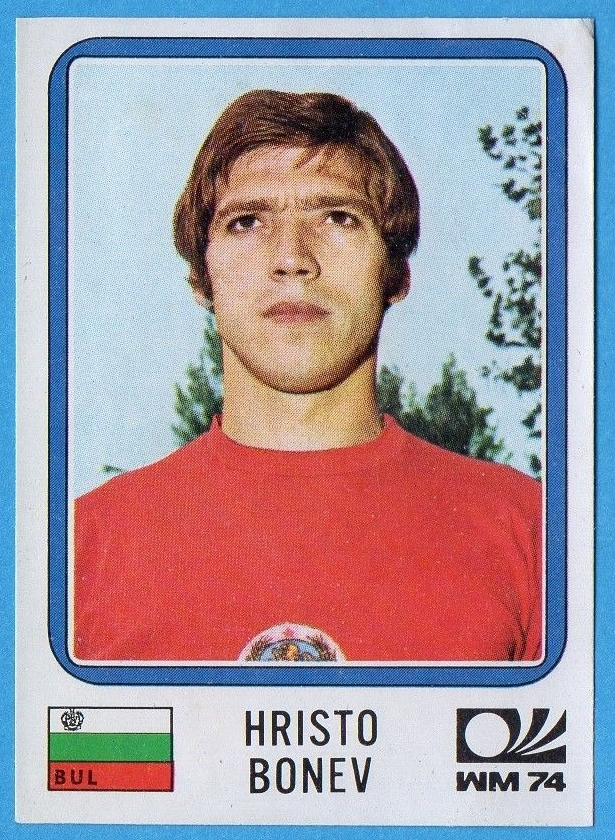
Hristo Bonev

- Todor Barzov – Doxa Drama, Panionios – 1982–1986
- Dimitar Berbatov – PAOK – 2015–2016
- Hristo Bonev – AEK Athens – 1979–1981
- Yordan Bozdanski – Ethnikos Piraeus – 1991–1992

C

- Krasimir Chavdarov – Doxa Drama – 1985–1986
- Tsvetomir Chipev – OFI – 2006–2007
- Krasimir Chomakov – Panionios – 2002

D

- Georgi Denev – Ethnikos Piraeus – 1979–1981
- Kiril Despodov – PAOK – 2023–
- Metodi Deyanov – OFI – 2002–2007
- Boko Dimitrov – Iraklis – 1981–1983
- Nikolay Dimitrov – Skoda Xanthi – 2015–2016
- Diyan Donchev – AEK Athens – 2000–2001
- Valeri Domovchiyski – Levadiakos – 2015–2016
- Vasil Dragolov – AEL, Ionikos – 1989–1991

E

- Eduard Eranosyan – Apollon Kalamarias – 1988–1989

F

G

- Vladimir Gadzhev – Panathinaikos, OFI – 2006–2008
- Borislav Georgiev – Kallithea, Levadiakos – 2002–2006, 2008–2009
- Dimitar Georgiev – Kavala – 1998
- Martin Georgiev – AEK Athens – 2025–
- Milen Georgiev – Panionios – 2002
- Martin Goranov – Apollon Athens – 1998
- Ivan Goranov – Lamia – 2022–2023

H

- Hristofor Hubchev – AEL – 2018–2019

I

- Valentin Ignatov – Aris – 1991–1992
- Ilian Iliev – AEK Athens – 1998–1999
- Ilian Iliev Jr. – A.E. Kifisia – 2023–2024
- Galin Ivanov – Ergotelis – 2004–2005
- Ivan Ivanov – Panathinaikos – 2016–2017

J

K

- Radko Kalaydzhiev – Ethnikos Piraeus – 1991–1992
- Martin Kamburov – Asteras Tripolis – 2007–2008
- Angel Kolev – AEK Athens – 1982–1984
- Hristo Kolev – Panathinaikos, Athinaikos, Athinaikos – 1988–1996
- Krasimir Kolev – Proodeftiki – 1997–1998
- Kostadin Kostadinov – Doxa Drama – 1989–1990
- Emil Kremenliev – Olympiacos – 1995–1996
- Daniel Kutev – Skoda Xanthi – 2012–2013

L

- Tomas Lafchis – OFI, Panathinaikos – 1981–1986, 1987–1989

M

- Ivan Mitev – Skoda Xanthi, Kavala – 1992–1995

N

- Sasho Nachev – Kavala – 1994–1995
- Daniel Naumov – OFI – 2024–2025

O

P

- Ivaylo Panchev – Panserraikos – 1991–1992
- Pavel Panov – Aris – 1981–1982
- Ivelin Penev – Naoussa – 1993–1994
- Aleks Petkov – A.E. Kifisia – 2025–
- Gosho Petkov – AEL – 1990–1992
- Milen Petkov – AEK Athens, Atromitos – 2000–2006
- Plamen Petkov – Levadiakos – 1990–1991
- Nikolay Petrunov – Panserraikos – 1990–1992
- Todor Pramatarov – Kavala – 1994–1995

Q

R

- Angel Rangelov – Iraklis – 1981–1982
- Ivan Rusev – AEK Athens, Athinaikos, Levadiakos – 2003–2008

S

- Vladko Shalamanov – Aris – 1991–1992
- Georgi Sheytanov – PAS Giannina – 2002–2003
- Stoycho Stoev – Panserraikos – 1989–1992
- Borislav Stoychev – Atromitos – 2015–2016

T

- Plamen Tachev – Ethnikos Piraeus – 1989–1990
- Hristo Telkiyski – PAS Giannina, Akratitos, Kallithea – 2002–2006
- Tihomir Todorov – Apollon Athens – 1999–2000
- Aleksandar Tomash – OFI – 2004–2005
- Igor Tomašić – Kavala – 2010–2011
- Martin Topuzov – Akratitos – 2001–2002
- Georgi Tsingov – AEL – 1987–1988
- Petar Tsvetanov – Akratitos – 2001–2003
- Plamen Tsvetkov – Doxa Drama – 1986–1990

U

- Chigozie Udoji – Asteras Tripolis, Platanias, Atromitos, Aris – 2009–2011, 2012–2013

V

- Mihail Valchev – Doxa Drama – 1986–1987, 1988–1990
- Valeri Valkov – Aris – 1991–1992
- Nikola Velkov – PAS Giannina – 1986–1987
- Boycho Velichkov – Panserraikos – 1987–1990

W

X

Y

- Todor Yanchev – Kallithea – 2005–2006

Z

=== Croatia ===
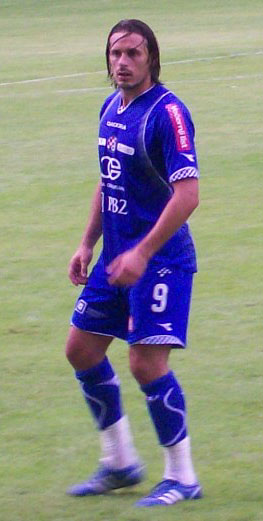
Boško Balaban

A

- Domagoj Abramović – Thrasyvoulos – 2009
- Perica Adžić – Apollon Kalamarias – 1992–1993
- Adnan Aganović – AEL – 2017–2018
- Srđan Andrić – Panathinaikos – 2004–2007
- Aljoša Asanović – Panathinaikos – 1998–2000

B

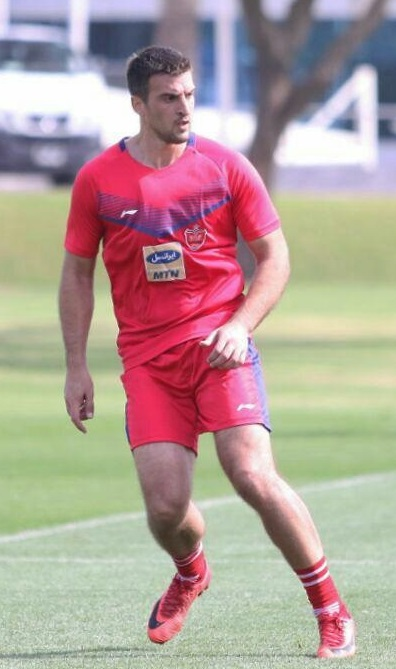
Mario Budimir

- Boško Balaban – Panionios – 2009–2012
- Stojan Belajić – Apollon Athens – 1999–2000
- Mateo Bertoša – Ergotelis – 2009–2011
- Marino Biliškov – Iraklis – 2006–2007
- Igor Bišćan – Panathinaikos – 2005–2007
- Mario Bonić – Apollon Athens, Panachaiki – 1980–1983
- Ivan Bošnjak – Iraklis – 2009–2010
- Mislav Bradvić – Ethnikos Asteras – 2000–2001
- Slavko Bralić – AEL – 2019
- Ivan Brnić – Olympiacos – 2023–2025
- Karlo Bručić – Apollon Smyrnis – 2020–2021
- Mario Budimir – Ergotelis, Panetolikos – 2007–2012, 2014
- Igor Budiša – Panachaiki, Skoda Xanthi – 2002–2004
- Nino Bule – Panserraikos – 2009
- Tomislav Butina – Olympiacos – 2006–2008

C

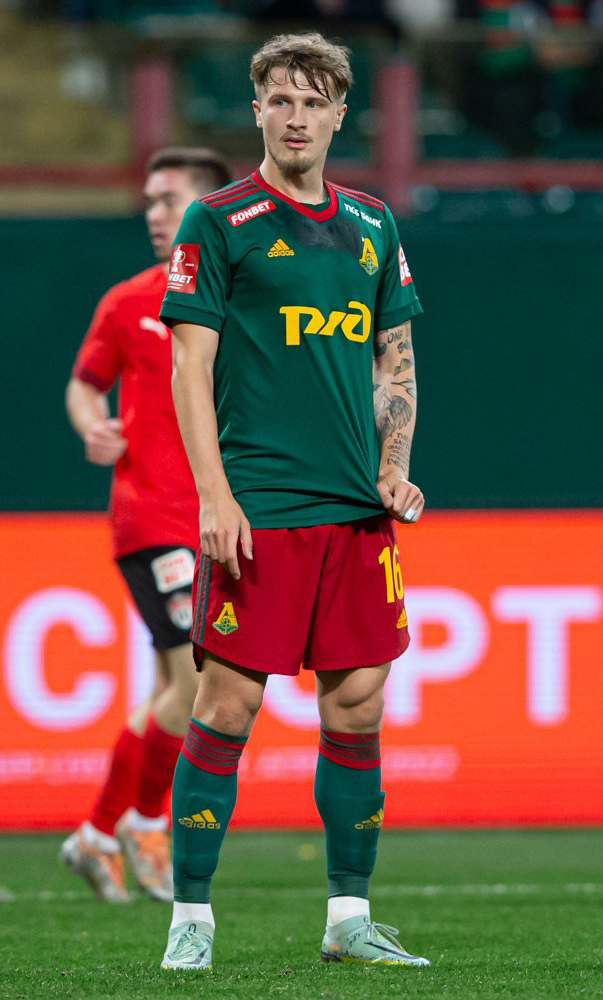
Tin Jedvaj

- Dario Čanađija – A.E. Kifisia – 2024
- Luka Capan – A.E. Kifisia – 2023–2024
- Danijel Cesarec – Egaleo, Asteras Tripolis, Aris – 2005–2012
- Antonio Čolak – PAOK – 2020–2022
- Ivan Čović – Apollon Smyrnis – 2017–2018
- Dino Grozdanić – Asteras Tripolis – 2023–

D

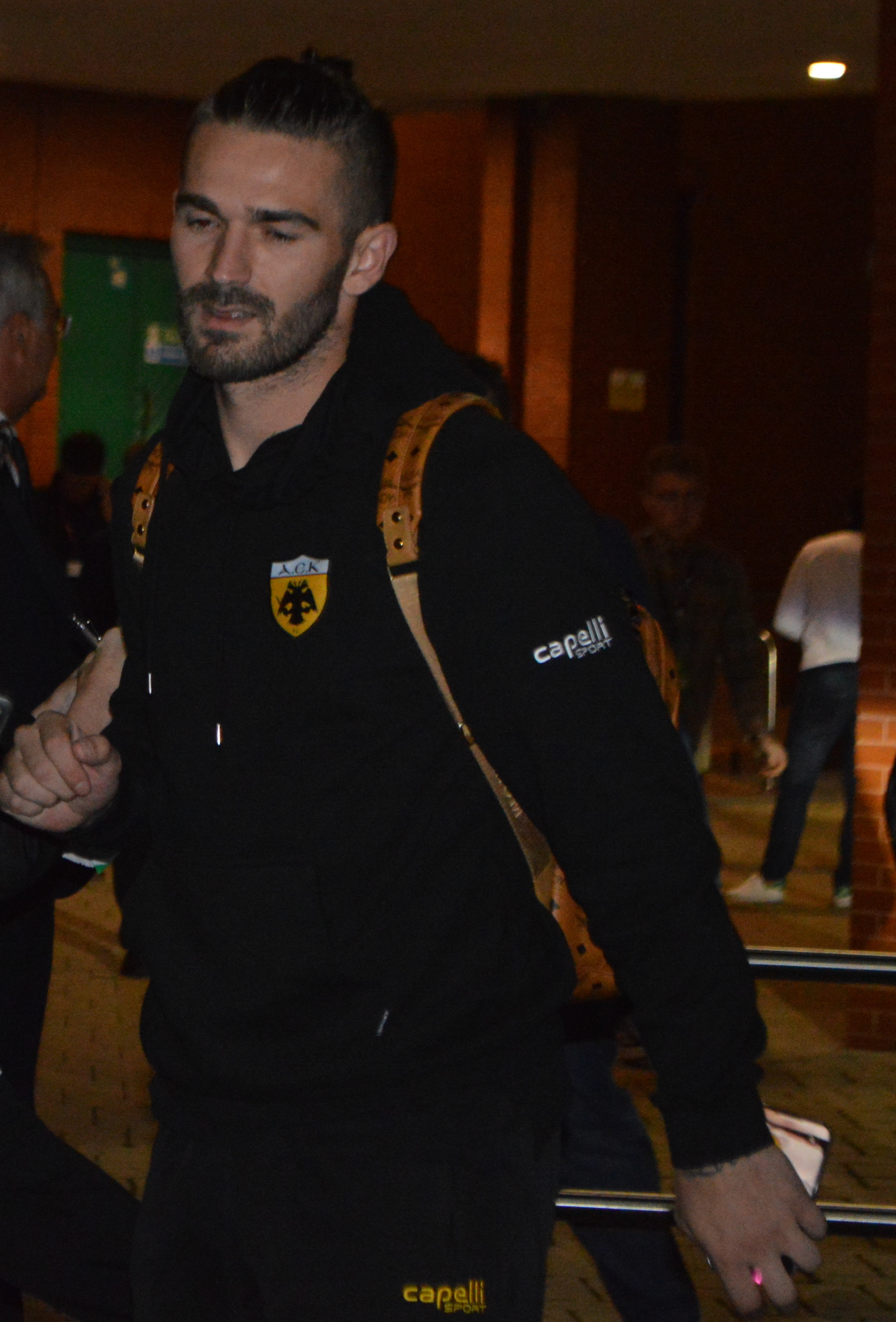
Marko Livaja

- Toni Datković – Aris – 2020–2021
- Dino Drpić – AEK Athens – 2011
- Neven Đurasek – Aris – 2023–2024

E

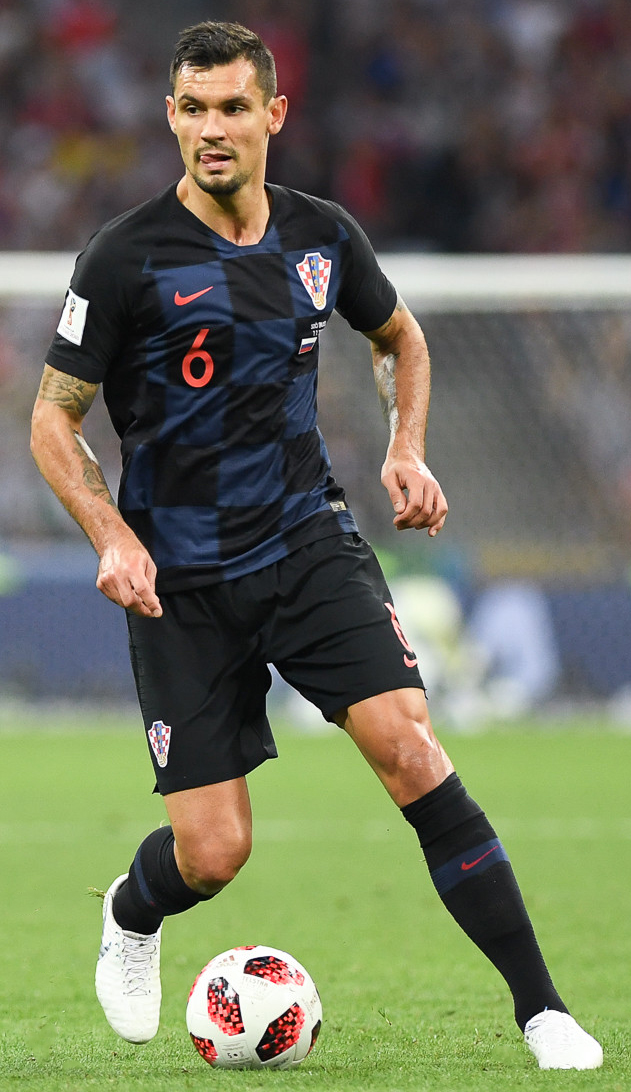
Dejan Lovren

F

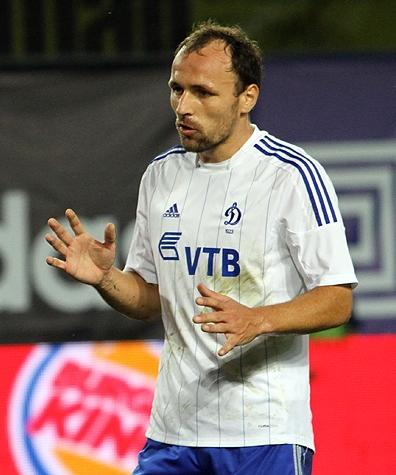
Gordon Schildenfeld

G

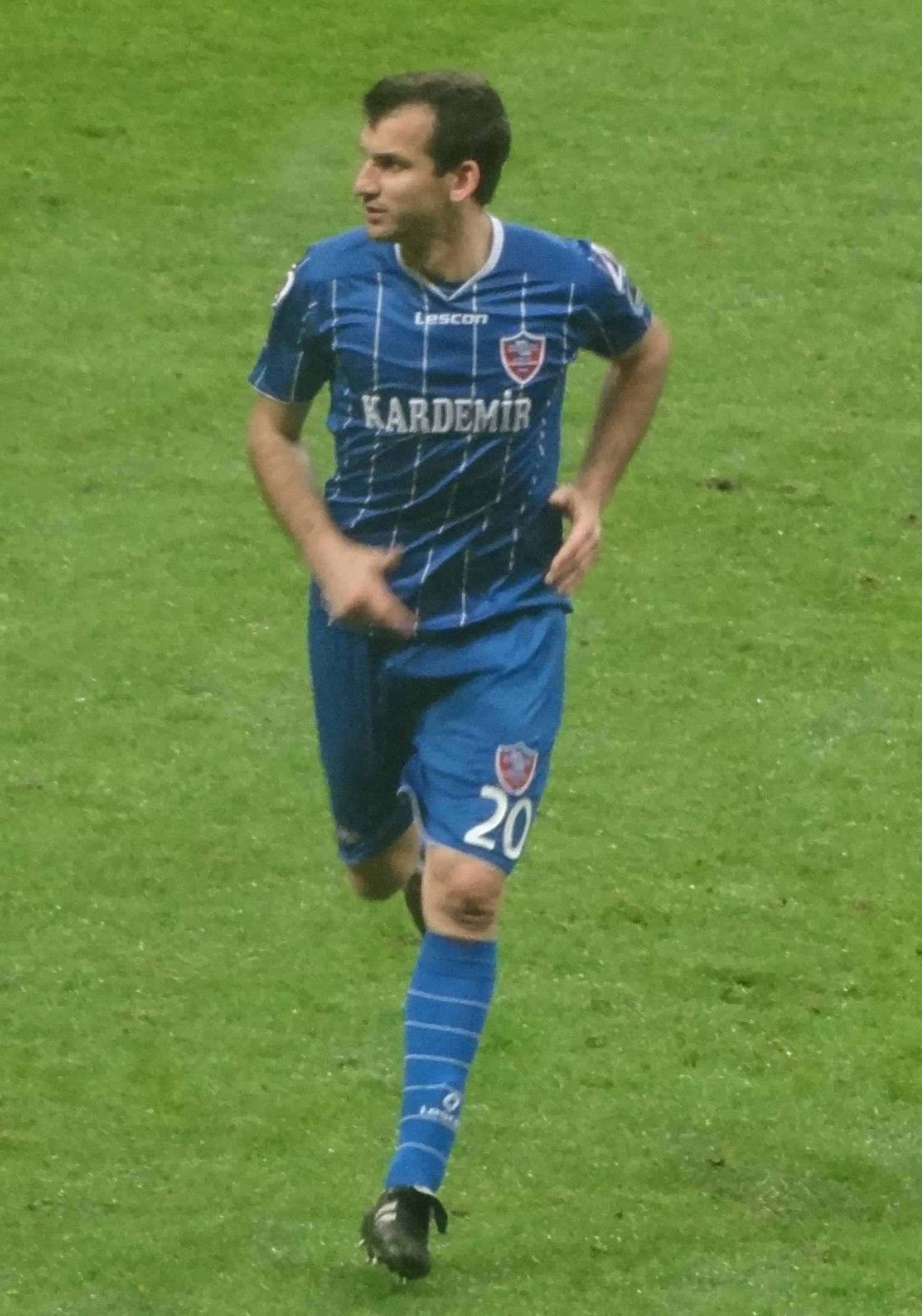
Anthony Šerić

- Tonči Gabrić – PAOK – 1991–1993
- Mario Galinović – Panathinaikos, Kavala, Kerkyra – 2004–2012

H

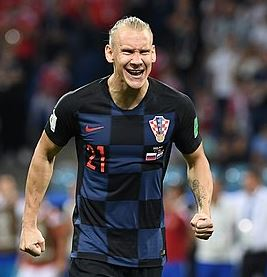
Domagoj Vida

I

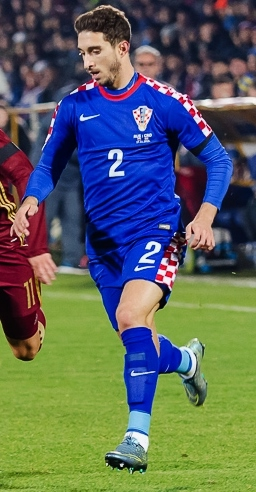
Šime Vrsaljko

- Luka Ivanušec – PAOK – 2025–2026
- Ivica Ivušić – Olympiacos – 2018

J

- Adriano Jagušić – Panathinaikos – 2026–
- Kristijan Jakić – PAOK – 2026–
- Antonio Jakoliš – Panetolikos – 2020–2021
- Hrvoje Jančetić – Egaleo – 2006–2008
- Rajko Janjanin – OFI, AEK Athens – 1985–1988
- Robert Jarni – Panathinaikos – 2001–2002
- Vedran Ješe – Kavala – 2010–2011
- Tin Jedvaj – Panathinaikos – 2023–2026
- Igor Jovanović – Panetolikos – 2019

K

- Siniša Končalović – Panachaiki – 1992–1994
- Dominik Kotarski – PAOK – 2022–2025
- Dario Krešić – Panionios, PAOK – 2006–2012
- Sandi Križman – AEL, PAS Giannina – 2017–2021
- Krešimir Krizmanić – OFI – 2025–
- Davor Kukec – Panionios – 2009–2011

L

- Marin Leovac – PAOK – 2015–2018
- Marko Livaja – AEK Athens – 2017–2021
- Robert Ljubičić – AEK Athens – 2024–
- Dejan Lovren – PAOK – 2024–2026
- Andrej Lukić – Apollon Smyrnis – 2018–2019

M

- Lovro Majer – AEK Athens – 2026–
- Lovro Majkić – Aris – 2025–
- Matej Marković – Levadiakos – 2022–2023
- Neven Marković – Kerkyra – 2010
- Marko Marić – Egaleo, Skoda Xanthi – 2005–2007, 2010
- Marko Marić – Atromitos – 2022–2023
- Silvio Marić – Panathinaikos – 2003–2005
- Milan Maričić – Panachaiki – 1992–1993
- Patrik Mijić – A.E. Kifisia – 2026–
- Tomislav Mikulić – Panthrakikos – 2013–2014
- Darko Miladin – Ergotelis – 2007–2008
- Goran Milanko – PAOK – 1994–1995
- Hrvoje Milić – Olympiacos – 2017–2018
- Josip Mišić – PAOK – 2019–2020
- Dean Mostahinić – Ethnikos Piraeus – 1989–1990
- Mateo Mužek – AEL – 2020–2021

N

- Martin Novoselac – Olympiacos – 1980–1982

O

P

- Roberto Paliska – Pierikos – 1991–1993
- Domagoj Pavičić – Aris – 2023–2025
- Dragan Perić – Veria – 1986–1987
- Mladen Petrić – Panathinaikos – 2014–2016
- Zdravko Popović – OFI, Levadiakos, Atromitos – 2007–2012
- Danijel Pranjić – Panathinaikos – 2013–2016
- Tonći Pirija – OFI – 2002–2003

Q

R

- Velimir Radman – Panserraikos, Atromitos – 2010–2013
- Ivan Režić – Olympiacos – 2004–2006
- Wagner Ribeiro – Panionios – 2006–2009
- Goran Roce – Xanthi – 2017–2018
- Goran Rubil – Asteras Tripolis – 2010–2012
- Ante Rukavina – Panathinaikos – 2008–2010
- Zlatko Runje – Panthrakikos – 2008–2010

S

- Zvonimir Šarlija – Panathinaikos – 2021–2023
- Daniel Šarić – Panathinaikos – 2000–2003
- Gordon Schildenfeld – PAOK, Panathinaikos – 2012–2015
- Anthony Šerić – Panathinaikos – 2005–2008
- Josip Šimić – Aris – 2001–2002
- Zoran Slišković – AEK Athens – 1992–1994
- Dario Smoje – Panionios – 2009–2010
- Dario Špikić – Aris – 2025
- Boško Šutalo – Aris – 2026–

T

- Josip Tomašević – Atromitos – 2020–2021
- Ante Tomić – Skoda Xanthi – 2007–2008
- Goran Tomić – AEK Athens – 1998
- Ivan Turina – Skoda Xanthi – 2007–2008

U

V

- Domagoj Vida – AEK Athens – 2022–
- Goran Vlaović – Panathinaikos – 2000–2004
- Jurica Vranješ – Aris – 2011–2012
- Tomislav Vranjić – AEL – 2008–2009
- Branko Vrgoč – Panetolikos – 2021–2022
- Šime Vrsaljko – Olympiacos – 2022
- Bojan Vručina – Panserraikos – 2010–2011

W

X

Y

Z

- Velimir Zajec – Panathinaikos – 1984–1988
- Nikola Žižić – AEL – 2017–2021

=== Cyprus ===
A

- Marios Agathokleous – Aris – 1998–2001
- Akis Agiomamitis – OFI – 1979–1986
- Alekos Alekou – Iraklis – 2006–2007
- Nektarios Alexandrou – AEL – 2006–2008
- Stathis Aloneftis – AEL – 2005–2007
- Marios Antoniades – Panionios – 2016–2017
- Georgios Aresti – AEK Athens – 2012–2013
- Kostakis Artymatas – Kerkyra – 2017–2018
- Andreas Avraam – AEL – 2016–2017

B

C

- Christos Charalabous – Skoda Xanthi, Panthrakikos – 2002–2003, 2006–2009
- Constantinos Charalambidis – Panathinaikos, PAOK – 2005–2007
- Elias Charalambous – PAOK, Levadiakos – 2005–2007, 2014
- Georgios Christodoulou – Olympiacos, Ionikos – 1990–1993
- Marios Christodoulou – Iraklis, Aris, Akratitos – 1995–2002, 2004
- Athos Chrysostomou – Egaleo – 2005–2006
- Pavlos Correa – Volos – 2024–2025

D

- Siniša Dobrašinović – Kavala – 2009–2010

E

- Costas Elia – Skoda Xanthi – 2002–2003
- Nikos Englezou – AEK Athens – 2011–2012
- Panagiotis Engomitis – PAOK – 2000–2006

F

- Dimitris Froxylias – AEK Athens – 2010–2011

G

- Alexandros Garpozis – PAOK, Skoda Xanthi – 2004–2007
- Antonis Georgallides – Platanias – 2013–2014
- Tasos Giallouris – Egaleo – 2007–2008
- Siniša Gogić – Olympiacos – 1997–2000

H

I

- Lazaros Iakovou – Panachaiki, Apollon Kalamarias – 1999–2000, 2004–2005
- Nicholas Ioannou – Aris – 2021

J

K

- Andreas Karo – OFI – 2023–2024
- Giorgos Kavazis – AEK Athens, Kalamata – 1999–2001
- Konstantinos Karagiannis – Volos – 2023–2024
- Andreas Karamanolis – Panserraikos – 2024–2026
- Demetris Kizas – Panathinaikos, Panachaiki, OFI – 1975–1983, 1984–1986, 1987–1988
- Georgios Kolokoudias – Panserraikos – 2007–2008
- Georgios Konstanti – Skoda Xanthi – 2004–2005
- Konstantinos Konstantinou – Ionikos – 1998–1999
- Konstantinos Konstantinou – Ionikos – 2003–2005
- Michalis Konstantinou – Iraklis, Panathinaikos, Olympiacos – 1997–2008
- Ioannis Kosti – Olympiacos, AEL, Levadiakos – 2020–
- Lefteris Kouis – Apollon Athens – 1984–1986
- Kyriakos Koureas – Olympiacos – 1970–1973
- Ioannis Kousoulos – A.E. Kifisia – 2026–
- Simos Krassas – AEK Athens, Panionios – 2004–2006
- Theodosis Kyprou – AEL Kalloni – 2014–2015

L

- Konstantinos Laifis – Olympiacos – 2016
- Leonidas Leonidou – Olympiacos – 1970–1971
- Liasos Louka – PAOK – 2003–2005

M

- Costas Malekkos – Panathinaikos – 1997
- Christos Marangos – Aris – 2006–2007
- Neofytos Michael – PAS Giannina, Asteras Tripolis – 2018–2020
- Stefanos Mouhtaris – Panionios – 2017
- Nestoras Mytidis – Kerkyra – 2017–2018

N

- Alexandre Negri – Aris – 2006–2007
- Marios Neofytou – OFI – 2003–2004
- Marios Nicolaou – Panionios, Levadiakos – 2007–2010, 2015–2016

O

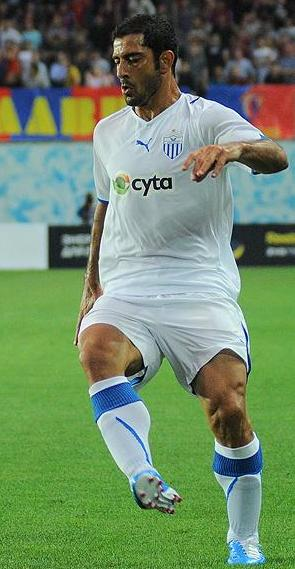
Ioannis Okkas

- Ioannis Okkas – PAOK, AEK Athens, Olympiacos – 2000–2007

P

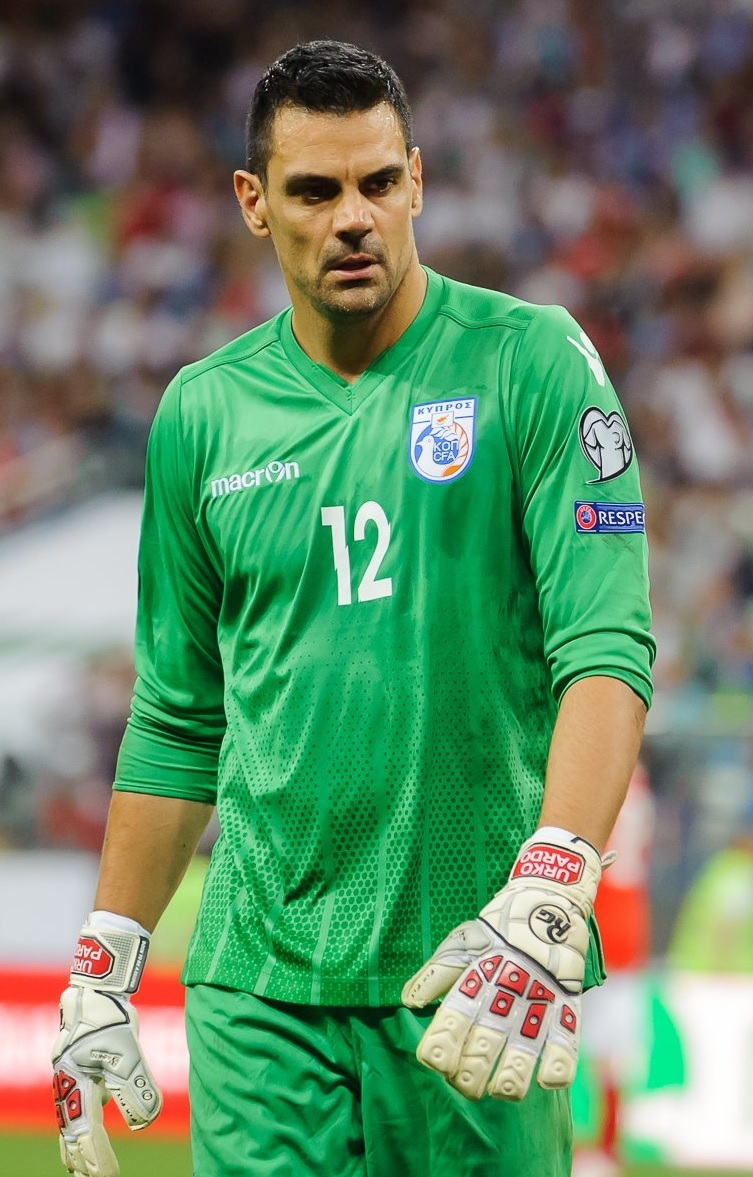
Urko Pardo

- Giorgos Pantziaras – Aris – 1978–1984
- Pamboullis Papadopoulos – Olympiacos, OFI – 1970–1978
- Stavros Papadopoulos – Ethnikos Piraeus, Olympiacos – 1974–1986
- Giorgos Papageorgiou – Apollon Smyrnis – 2021–2022
- Nikodimos Papavasiliou – OFI – 1988–1993, 1994–1995
- Fotis Papoulis – Panthrakikos, OFI – 2011–2012
- Urko Pardo – Iraklis, Olympiacos – 2007–2008, 2009–2011
- Kyriacos Pavlou – Panionios – 2006–2007
- Georgios Pelagias – Kerkyra – 2006–2007
- Kostas Pileas – Panserraikos – 2023–2024
- Savvas Poursaitidis – Doxa Drama, Veria, Olympiacos, Skoda Xanthi – 1994–2002

Q

R

S

- Giorgos Savvidis – AEK Athens – 1987–1992
- Giannis Satsias – Panetolikos – 2026–
- Christos Sielis – Volos, Panetolikos, OFI – 2022–
- Michalis Siimitras – Ionikos, Panathinaikos – 2004–2006
- Kostakis Socratous – Panachaiki – 1999–2000
- Andreas Stavrou – Doxa Drama – 1980–1986

T

- Nicos Timotheou – Proodeftiki – 2000
- Georgios Tofas – AEK Athens – 2007–2008

U

V

- Christos Velis – Athinaikos, PAOK, Iraklis – 1995–2001
- Stefanos Voskaridis – PAOK, Ergotelis – 1999–2004

W

X

Y

- Yiasoumis Yiasoumi – PAOK – 2001–2007

Z

=== Czech Republic ===
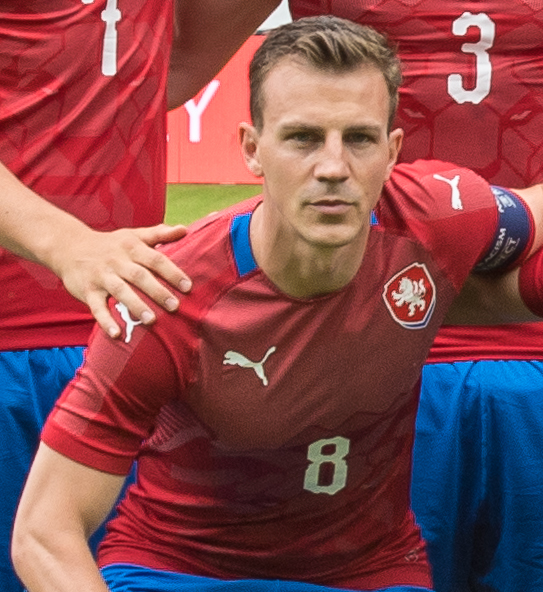
Vladimír Darida

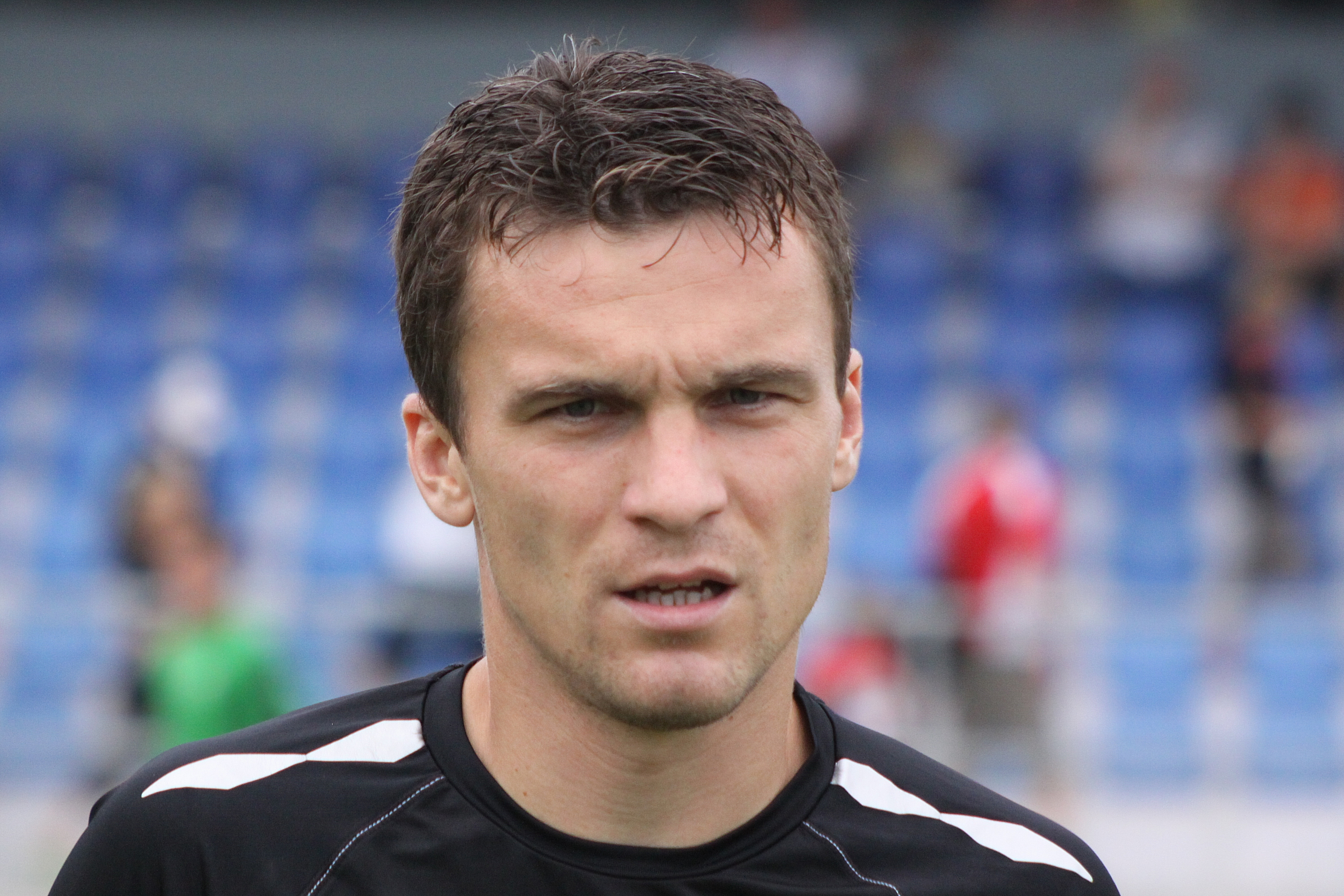
David Lafata

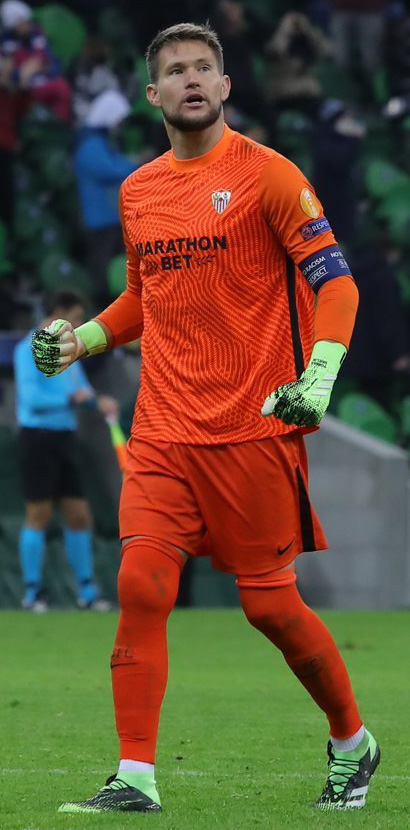
Tomáš Vaclík

- Tomáš Abrahám – Skoda Xanthi – 2009
- Jan Blažek – AEL, Apollon Smyrnis – 2010–2011, 2013–2014
- Jakub Brabec – Aris – 2021–2025
- Tomáš Černý – Ergotelis – 2014–2015
- Vladimír Darida – Aris – 2023–2025
- Libor Došek – Skoda Xanthi – 2009
- Jaroslav Drobný – Panionios – 2001–2005
- Pavel Drsek – Panionios – 2008
- Martin Frýdek – Aris – 2024–2026
- Jan Hable – Kerkyra – 2010–2013
- Tomáš Hájek – Panserraikos – 2023–2024
- Tomas Hamrik – Edessaikos – 1992–1993
- Matěj Hanousek – Athens Kallithea – 2024–2025
- Zdeněk Hruška – Veria – 1987–1988
- František Jakubec – Veria – 1987
- Karel Jarůšek – Panserraikos – 1985–1987
- Martin Knakal – Skoda Xanthi – 2007
- Jiří Kladrubský – AEL Kalloni – 2015–2016
- Jiří Krbeček – Skoda Xanthi – 1992–1993
- Michael Krmenčík – PAOK – 2021
- David Lafata – Skoda Xanthi – 2005–2006
- David Langer – Panionios – 2005–2006
- Martin Latka – Panionios – 2009–2011
- Lumír Mistr – Aris – 1998–1999
- Tomáš Necid – PAOK – 2013–2014
- Petar Novák – Iraklis – 1990–1991
- Radim Nečas – Skoda Xanthi – 1995–1996
- Martin Pařízek – Ionikos – 2002–2004
- Jiří Pavlenka – PAOK – 2024–
- Tomáš Pekhart – AEK Athens – 2016–2017
- Petr Pizanowski – Skoda Xanthi – 2005–2007
- Jakub Podaný – AEL Kalloni – 2013–2014
- Jakub Pokorný – A.E. Kifisia – 2025–2026
- Radek Rabušic – Edessaikos – 1993–1997
- Rudi Skácel – Panathinaikos, AEL – 2004–2005, 2010
- František Štambachr – AEK Athens, Apollon Athens – 1984–1985
- Václav Svěrkoš – Panionios – 2011
- Petr Trapp – Veria – 2013–2014
- Tomáš Vaclík – Olympiacos – 2021–2023
- Martin Vaniak – Panionios – 2005–2006
- Petr Vlček – Panionios – 2001–2005
- Martin Vozábal – Skoda Xanthi – 2005
- Jiří Záleský – Skoda Xanthi – 1994–1997
- Martin Zbončák – Iraklis – 2007

=== Denmark ===
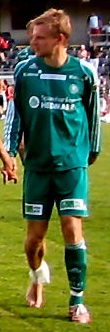
Jan Michaelsen

- Bent Christensen Arensøe – Olympiacos – 1993–1994
- Uffe Bech – Panathinaikos – 2019–2022
- Keld Bordinggaard – Panionios – 1988–1989
- Sebastian Grønning – OFI – 2023
- René Henriksen – Panathinaikos – 1999–2005
- Mikkel Bo Jensen – Panachaiki – 2002
- Jesper Johansen – PAOK – 1995–1996
- Jens Jønsson – AEK Athens – 2022–2026
- Victor Kristiansen – Panathinaikos – 2026–
- Rasmus Lauritsen – Iraklis – 2026–
- Christian Lundberg – Ethnikos Asteras – 2002
- Jens Christian Madsen – Skoda Xanthi – 2000–2001
- Klaus Mathiesen – Levadiakos – 1988–1990
- Jan Michaelsen – Panathinaikos – 2001–2004
- Claus Nielsen – Panathinaikos – 1988–1989
- Henrik Nielsen – AEK Athens, Iraklis – 1987–1989
- Nicki Bille Nielsen – Panionios – 2018
- Luka Racic – Volos – 2024
- Kasper Risgård – Panionios – 2010–2011
- Dennis Rommedahl – Olympiacos – 2010–2011
- Ole Skouboe – Aris – 1977–1980
- Pione Sisto – Aris, AEL – 2024–2026
- Niels Sørensen – Olympiacos – 1977–1978
- Rasmus Thelander – Panathinaikos – 2015–2017
- Philip Zinckernagel – Olympiacos – 2022

=== England ===
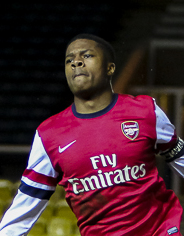
Chuba Akpom

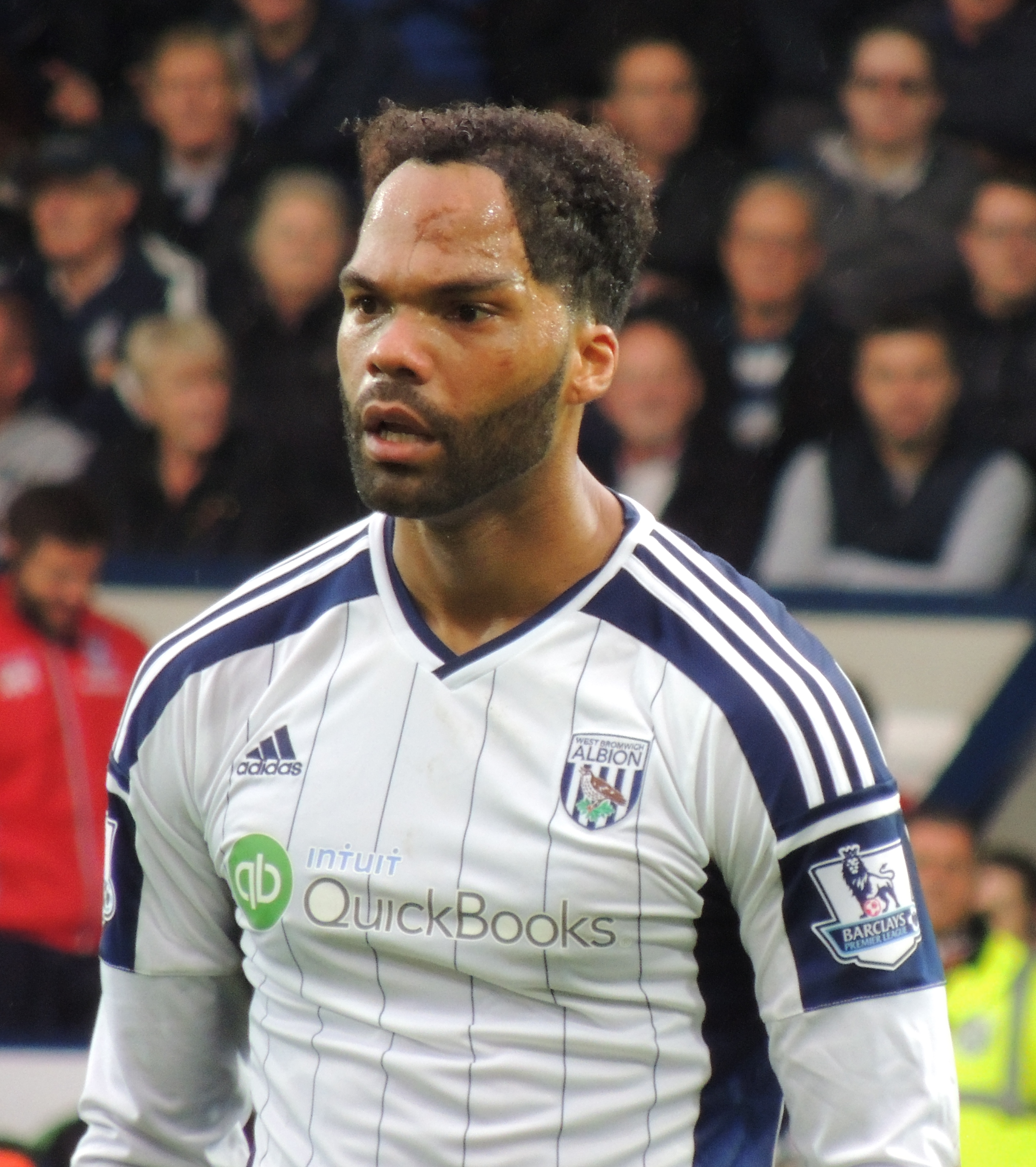
Joleon Lescott

- Nelson Abbey – Olympiacos – 2024–2025
- Darren Ambrose – Apollon Smyrnis – 2014
- Chuba Akpom – PAOK – 2018–2020, 2021–2022
- Hakeem Araba – Panthrakikos – 2014–2015
- Gboly Ariyibi – Panetolikos – 2019–2021
- Paul Beavers – Ethnikos Piraeus – 1999
- Alan Biley – Panionios – 1987–1988
- Josh Bowler – Olympiacos – 2022–2023
- Lee Cook – Apollon Smyrnis – 2014
- Matt Derbyshire – Olympiacos – 2009–2011
- Nathan Ellington – Skoda Xanthi – 2010
- Walter Figueira – Platanias – 2014–2015
- Marco Gabbiadini – Panionios – 1997
- Andre Green – Panserraikos – 2025―2026
- Garry Haylock – Panionios – 1998–1999
- Jonjoe Kenny – PAOK – 2025–
- Leon Knight – Thrasyvoulos – 2009
- Tommy Langley – AEK Athens – 1983
- Joleon Lescott – AEK Athens – 2016
- Colin Carr-Lawton – Ethnikos Piraeus – 1999
- Adil Nabi – OFI, Atromitos – 2019–2023
- Moses Odubajo – Aris, AEK Athens – 2022–2026
- Jordi Osei-Tutu – PAS Giannina – 2024
- Gary Owen – Panionios – 1986–1987
- Jonathan Panzo – Levadiakos – 2026–
- Micky Quinn – PAOK – 1995–1996
- John Reed – Ethnikos Piraeus – 1999
- Omar Richards – Olympiacos, Aris – 2023–2024, 2026–
- Mark Robins – Panionios – 1998–1999
- Mike Small – PAOK – 1988–1990
- Carl Smith – Ethnikos Piraeus – 1999
- Ryan Smith – Skoda Xanthi – 2013
- Shola Shoretire – PAOK – 2024–
- Luke Steele – Panathinaikos – 2014–2017
- Jordan Stewart – Skoda Xanthi – 2010–2011
- Wayne Thomas – Atromitos, Veria – 2011–2013
- Paul Tisdale – Panionios – 1998–1999
- Kaiyne Woolery – Ionikos, Panserraikos – 2023–2024

=== Estonia ===
- Sander Puri – AEL – 2010–2012

=== Finland ===
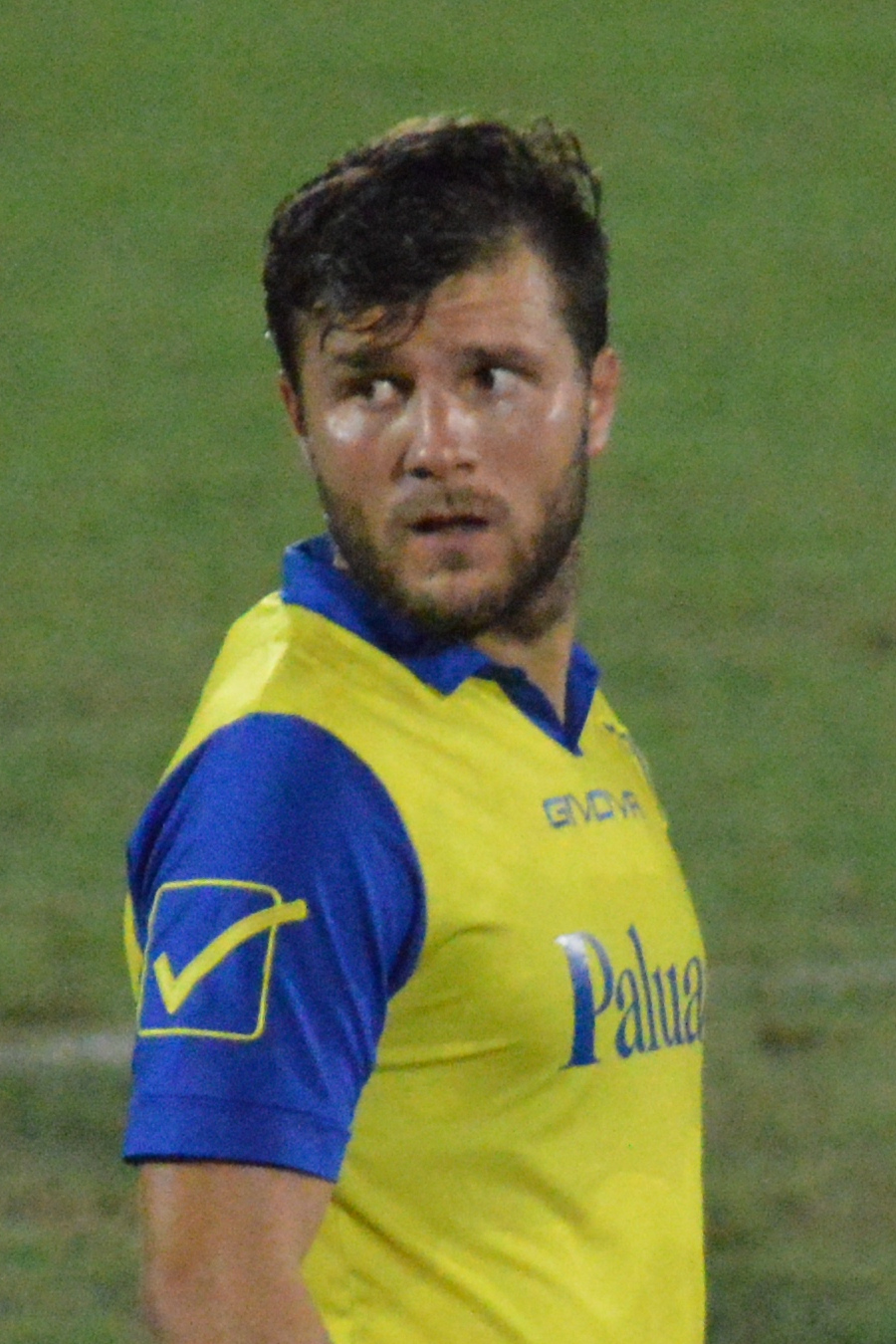
Perparim Hetemaj

- Nikolai Alho – Volos, Asteras Tripolis – 2022–2026
- Jasin-Amin Assehnoun – Volos – 2024–2026
- Mehmet Hetemaj – Panionios, Thrasyvoulos – 2008–2009
- Perparim Hetemaj – AEK Athens, Apollon Kalamarias – 2006–2009
- Robert Ivanov – Asteras Tripolis – 2025–2026
- Fredrik Jensen – Aris – 2025–
- Kaan Kairinen – AEK Athens – 2026–
- Joonas Kolkka – Panathinaikos – 2001–2003
- Njazi Kuqi – Panionios, Atromitos – 2011–2013
- Toni Lehtinen – Levadiakos – 2009
- Robin Lod – Panathinaikos – 2015–2018
- Niki Mäenpää – Athens Kallithea – 2024–2025
- Juha Pirinen – Volos – 2022–2023
- Pyry Soiri – Athens Kallithea – 2024–2025
- Simon Skrabb – Volos – 2025
- Tim Sparv – AEL – 2020–2021
- Jere Uronen – Atromitos – 2025–
- Ville Väisänen – Ethnikos Asteras – 2000–2001

=== France ===
A

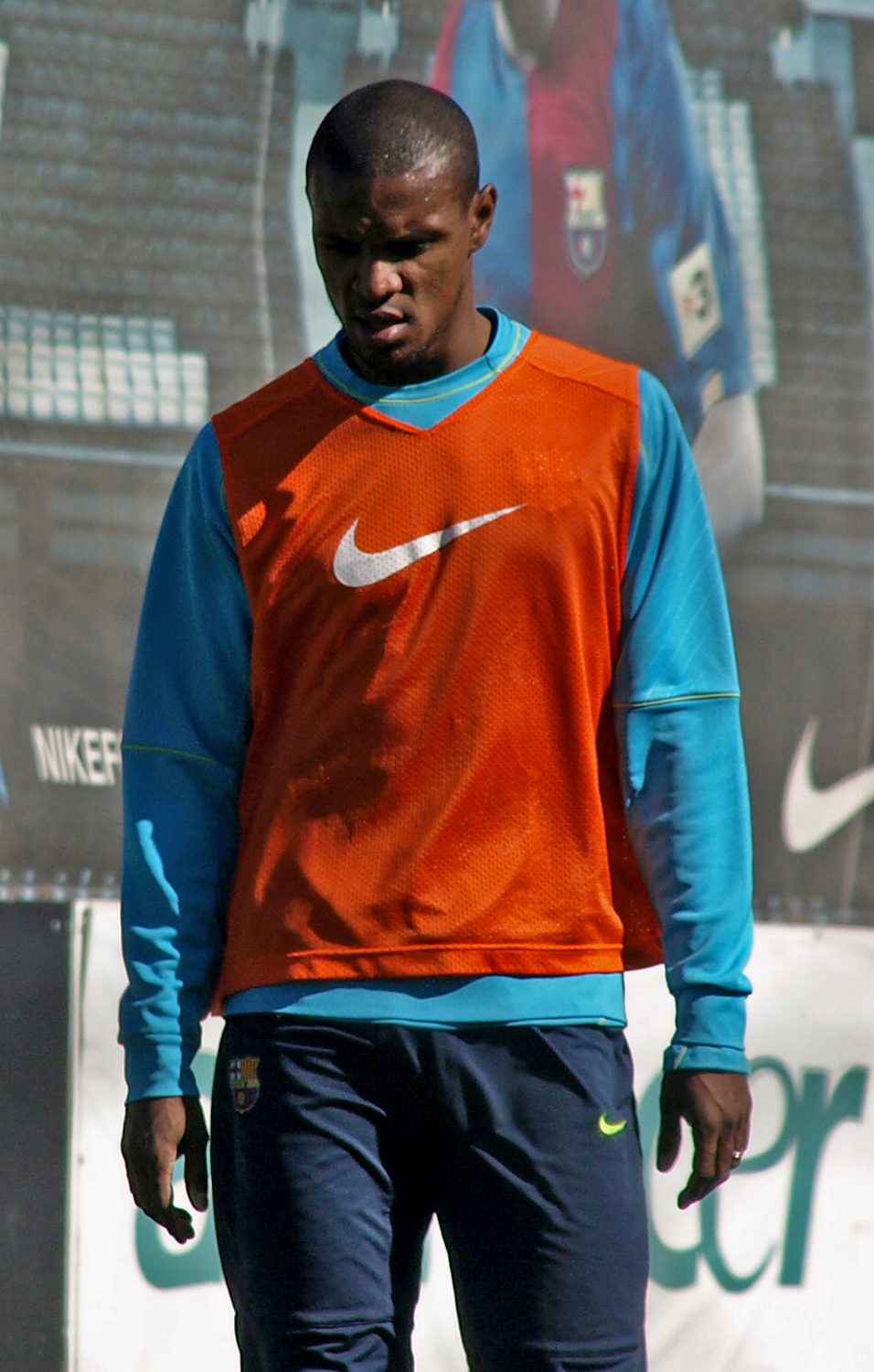
Eric Abidal

- Leroy Abanda – Lamia, OFI, Volos, A.E. Kifisia – 2022–2025, 2026–
- Eric Abidal – Olympiacos – 2014
- Losif Ait-Yahia – Ionikos – 2002–2003
- Migouel Alfarela – Athens Kallithea, Aris – 2025–
- Sofiane Sidi Ali – Panionios – 2018–2020
- Bobby Allain – Olympiacos, Ionikos – 2019–2020, 2023
- Jean-Pierre Antonetti – Egaleo – 2001–2003
- Fabien Antunes – Panetolikos, Ionikos, A.E. Kifisia – 2021–2024
- Yoël Armougom – Panserraikos – 2025–2026
- Romain Argyroudis – Olympiacos – 1971–1973

B

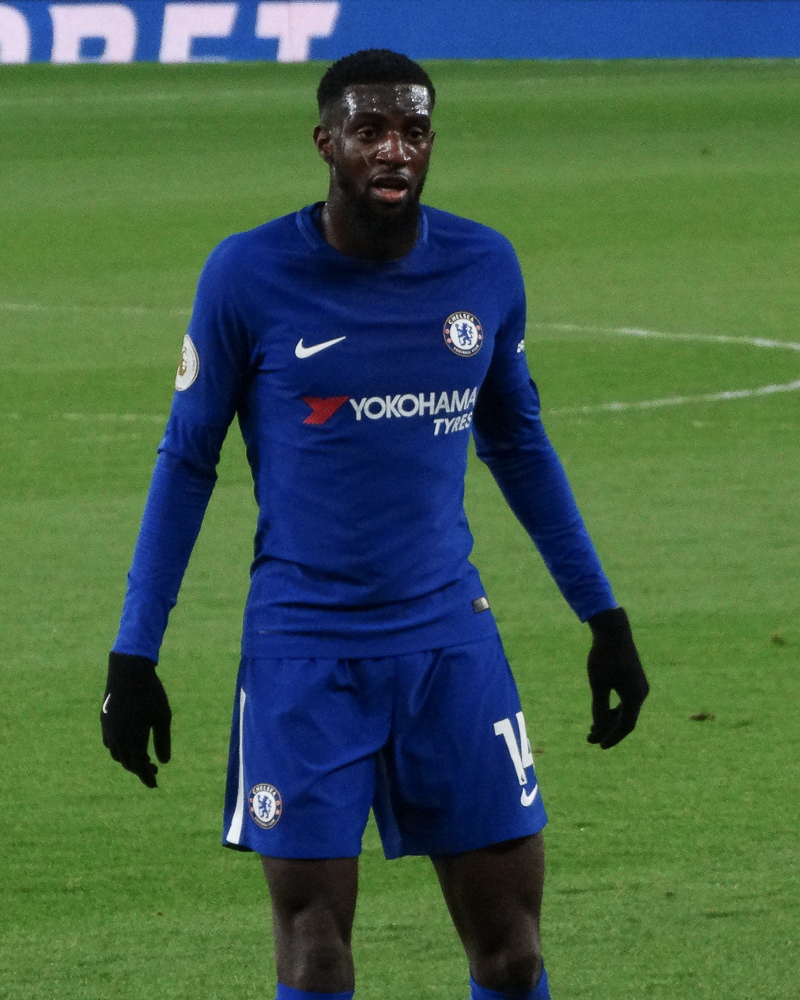
Tiémoué Bakayoko

- Abou Ba – Aris – 2019–2020
- Messemo Bakayoko – Kalamata – 2026–
- Tiémoué Bakayoko – PAOK – 2024–2025
- Franck-Yves Bambock – Panetolikos – 2024
- Christian Bassila – AEL – 2006–2007
- Jean-François Bedenik – Ionikos – 2006–2007
- Anthony Belmonte – Levadiakos – 2022–2023
- Lucas Bernadou – Volos – 2024–2025
- Franck Betra – PAS Giannina – 2017–2018
- Giulian Biancone – Olympiacos – 2023–2026
- Darnell Bile – Asteras Tripolis – 2024–2025
- Zacharie Boucher – Aris – 2020–2021
- Jean-Alain Boumsong – Panathinaikos – 2010–2013

C

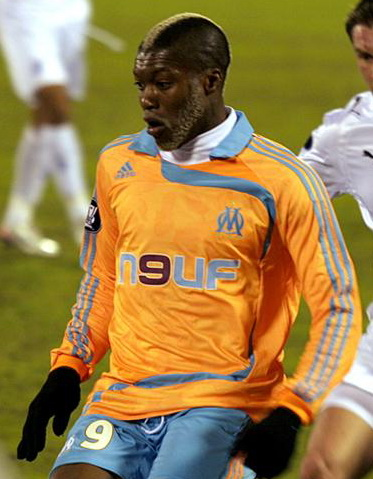
Djibril Cissé

- Rémy Cabella – Olympiacos, Volos – 2025–
- Etienne Camara – Panathinaikos – 2026–
- Djibril Cissé – Panathinaikos – 2009–2011
- Aly Cissokho – Olympiacos – 2017
- Alexandre Coeff – AEL – 2018–2019
- Aurélien Collin – Panserraikos – 2008–2009
- Quentin Cornette – Volos – 2023–2024
- Rolland Courbis – Olympiacos – 1973–1974
- Gary Coulibaly – Levadiakos – 2016–2017
- Pierrick Cros – Platanias – 2017–2018

D

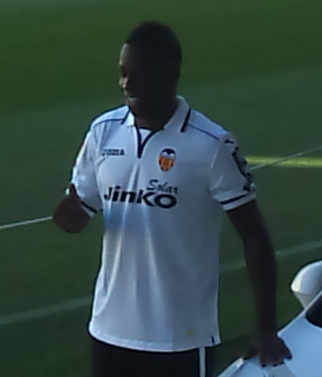
Aly Cissokho

- Abdoulaye Dabo – Olympiacos, Levadiakos – 2022–2023
- Stéphane Darbion – Skoda Xanthi – 2011–2012
- Maurice Dalé – Panserraikos – 2010–2011
- Wilfried Dalmat – Panetolikos – 2014
- Maxime De Taddeo – Panionios – 2018–2019
- Yero Dia – Levadiakos – 2007–2008
- Abdoulaye Dabo – Olympiacos – 2012
- Oumar Dieng – Akratitos – 2006
- Nicolas Diguiny – Panthrakikos, Atromitos, Aris – 2014–2020
- Kévin Diogo – Kerkyra – 2017–2018
- Didier Domi – Olympiacos – 2006–2010
- Pierre Ducrocq – Kavala – 2009–2011

E

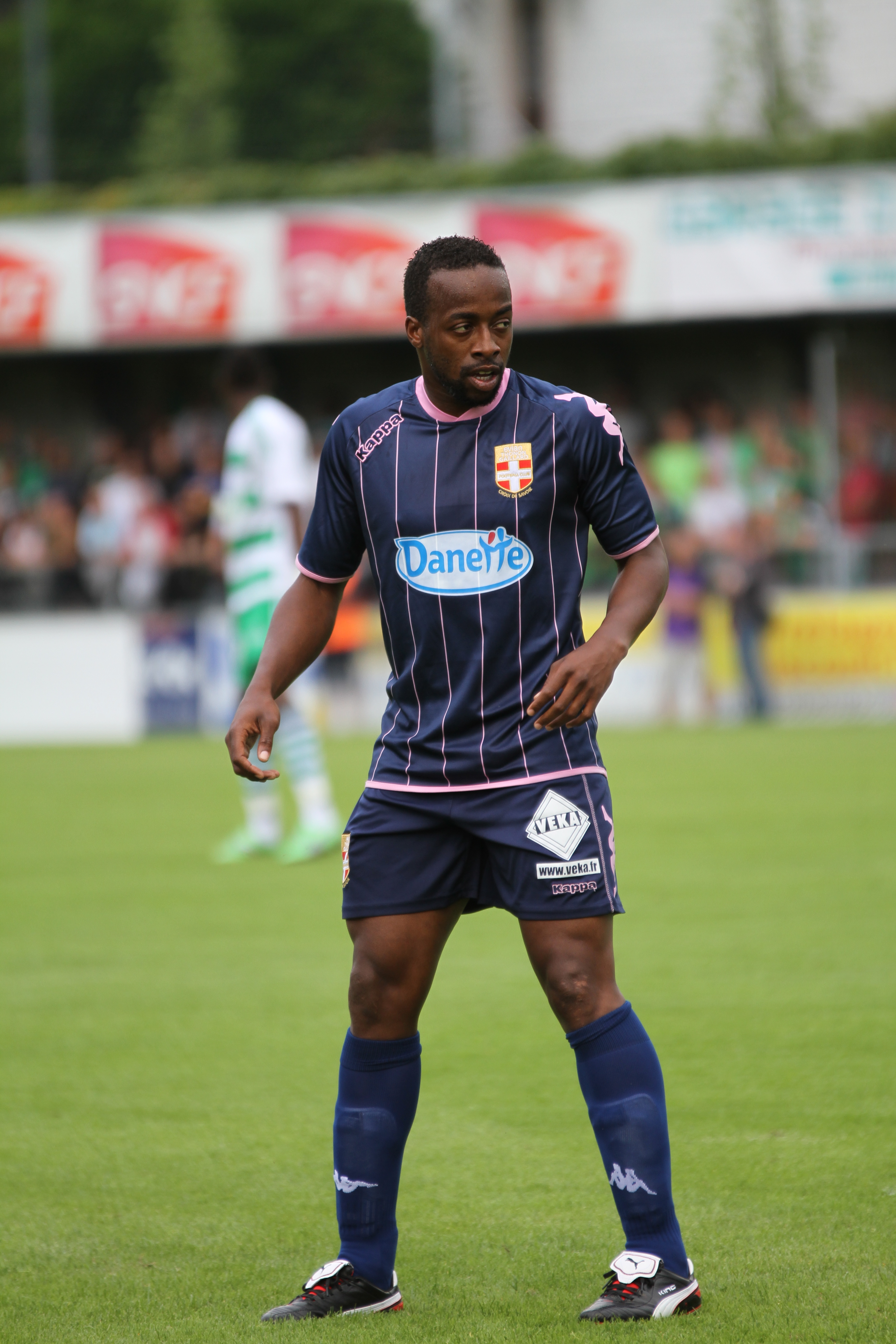
Sidney Govou

- William Edjenguélé – Panetolikos, Veria – 2011–2012, 2014–2016
- Christophe Ettori – Ionikos – 2002–2003

F

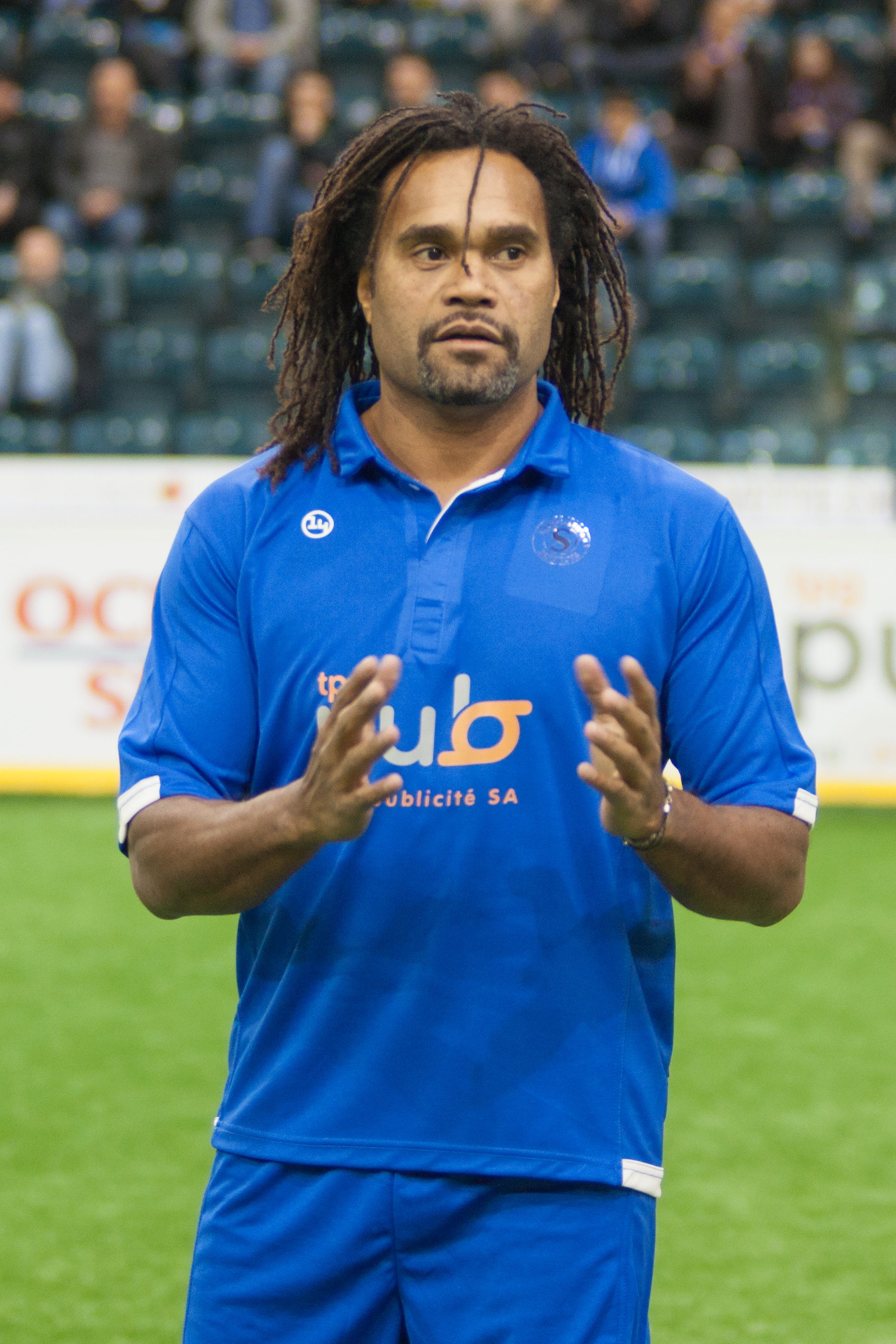
Christian Karembeu

- Bandiougou Fadiga – Olympiacos, Ionikos – 2022–2024
- Jordan Faucher – Xanthi – 2019–2020
- Romain Ferrier – Skoda Xanthi – 2008–2009
- Sylvain Flauto – Ionikos – 2002–2003
- Aboubacar Fofana – PAOK – 2002–2003
- Daniel Fuchs – Panathinaikos – 1974–1975

G

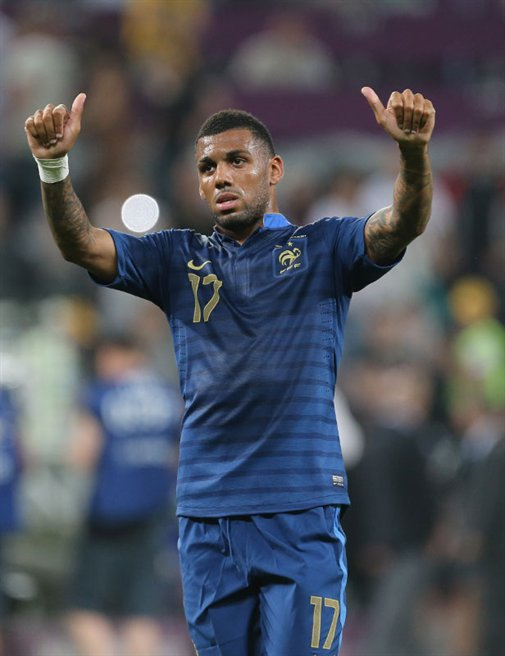
Yann M'Vila

- Jérémy Gelin – Panserraikos – 2024–2025
- Guy Gnabouyou – AEL Kalloni – 2014
- Mathieu Gomes – Kerkyra – 2014–2015, 2016–2018
- Sidney Govou – Panathinaikos – 2010–2011
- Axel Guessand – Kalamata – 2026–

H

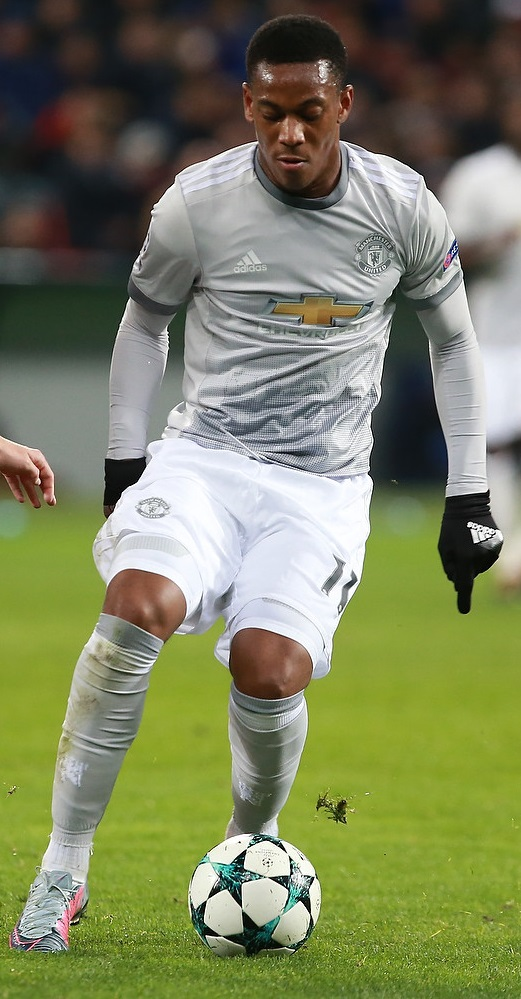
Anthony Martial

- Florent Hanin – Panetolikos – 2014
- Franck Histilloles – Panachaiki – 2001–2003
- Greg Houla – Ergotelis – 2015

I

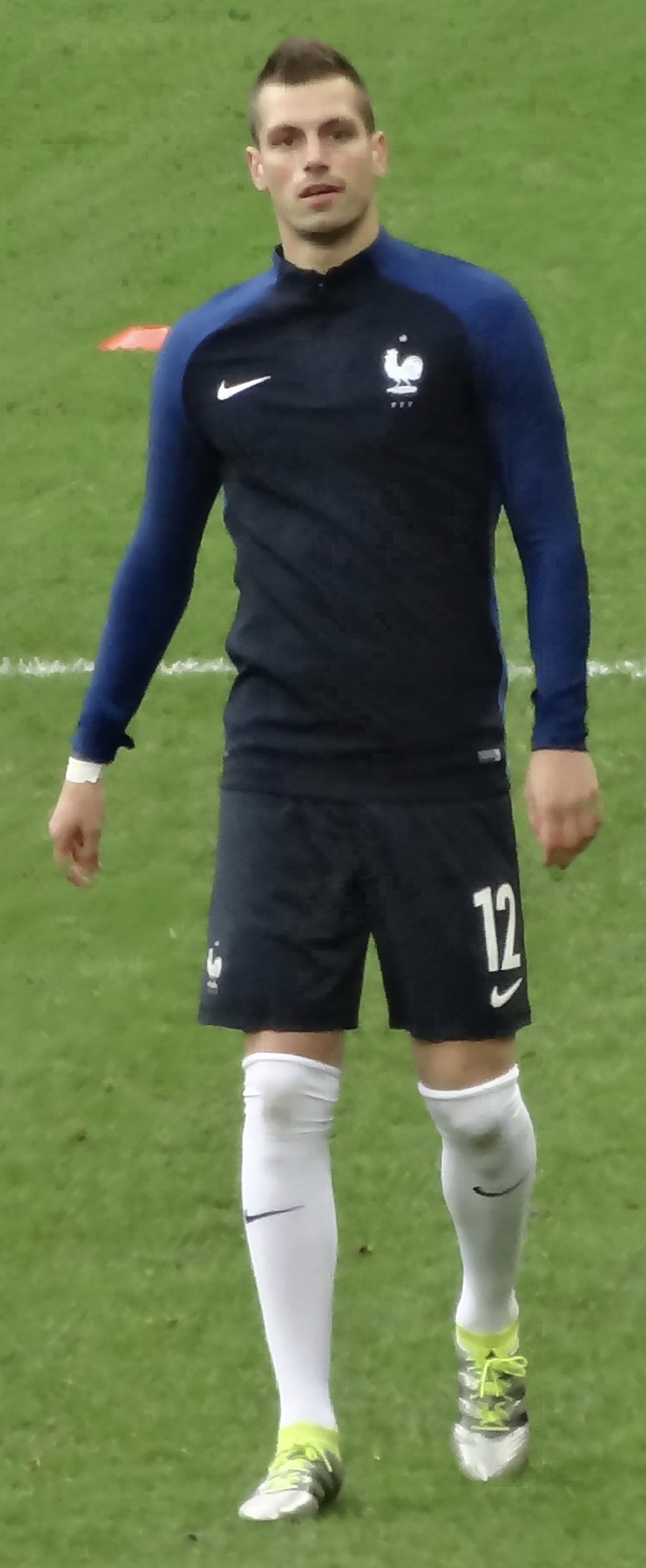
Morgan Schneiderlin

- Nicolas Isimat-Mirin – Athens Kallithea – 2024–2025

J

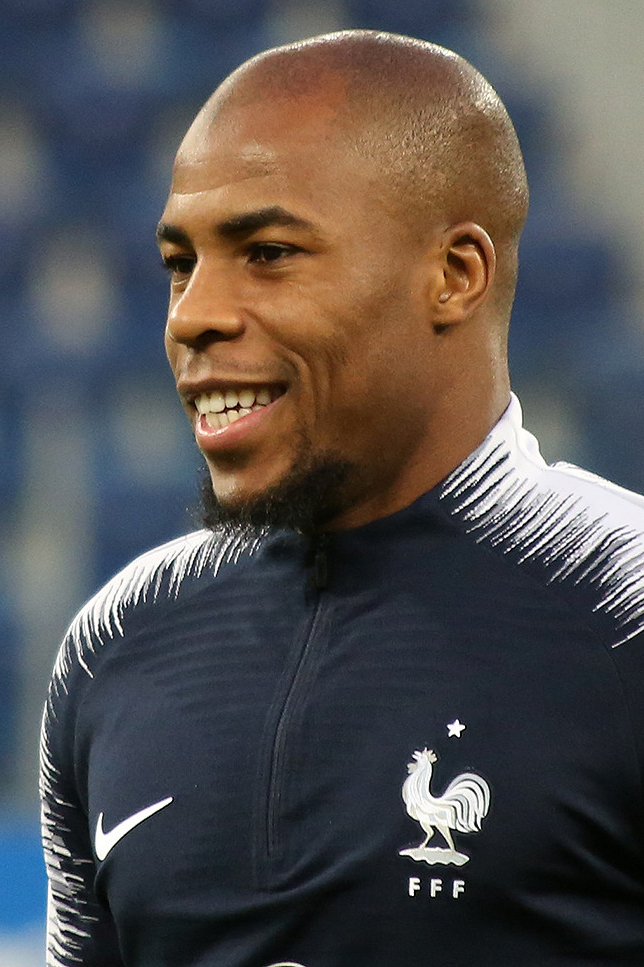
Djibril Sidibé

- Clément Jolibois – A.E. Kifisia – 2026–
- Maxime Josse – Panthrakikos, AEL Kalloni – 2013–2014
- Andrew Jung – OFI – 2024–2025

K

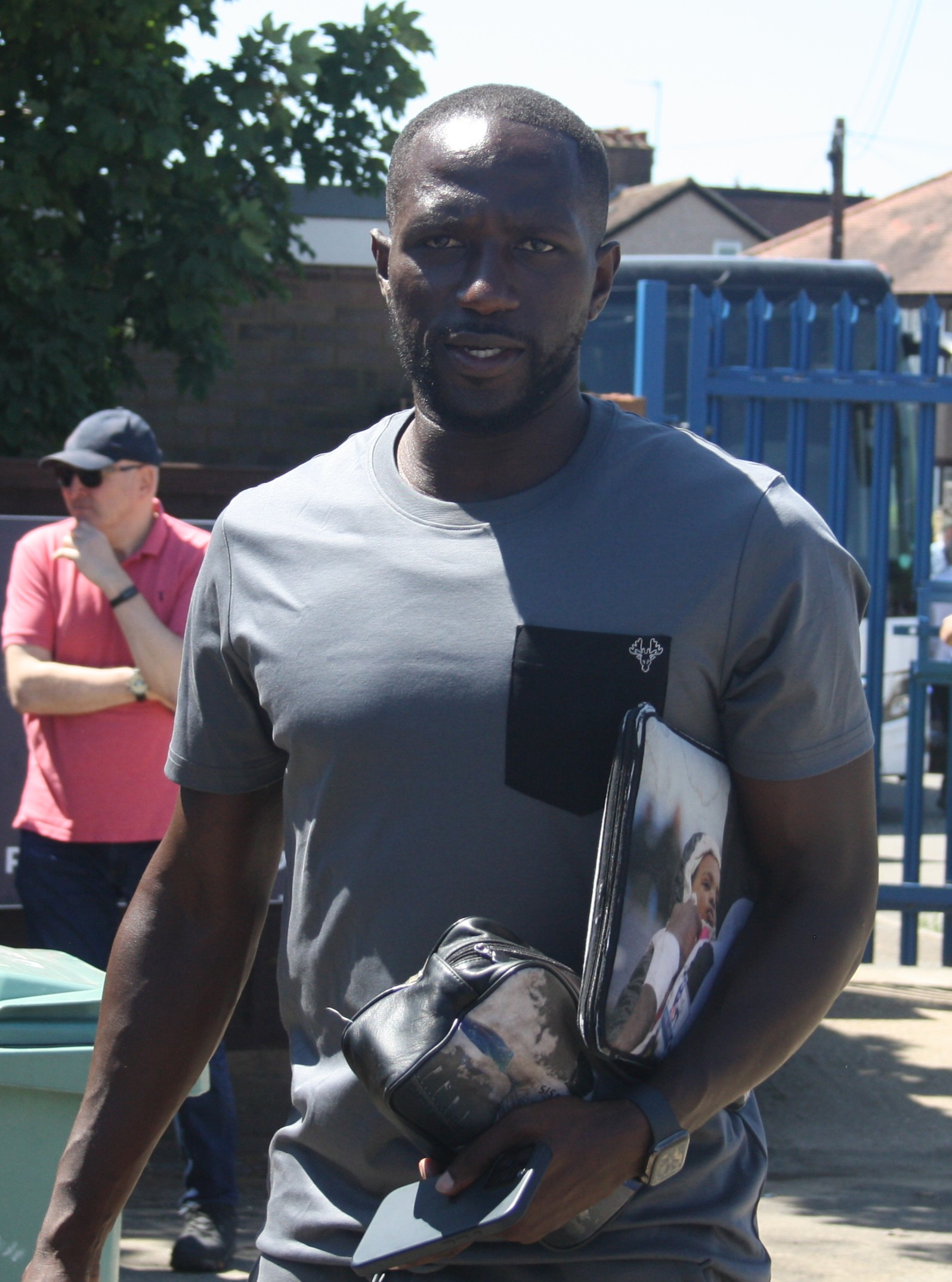
Moussa Sissoko

- Cyril Kali – Asteras Tripolis, Panserraikos, Veria, AEL, Panetolikos – 2007–2012, 2013–2014
- Kylian Kaïboué – Iraklis – 2026–
- Yann Boé-Kane – Ergotelis – 2015
- Olivier Kapo – Levadiakos – 2013–2014
- Christian Karembeu – Olympiacos – 2001–2004
- Sofiane Khadda – Xanthi – 2018–2020
- Lynel Kitambala – Apollon Smyrnis – 2017–2018
- Anthony Knockaert – Volos – 2022–2023
- Sekou Koné – Ionikos – 2002–2004

L

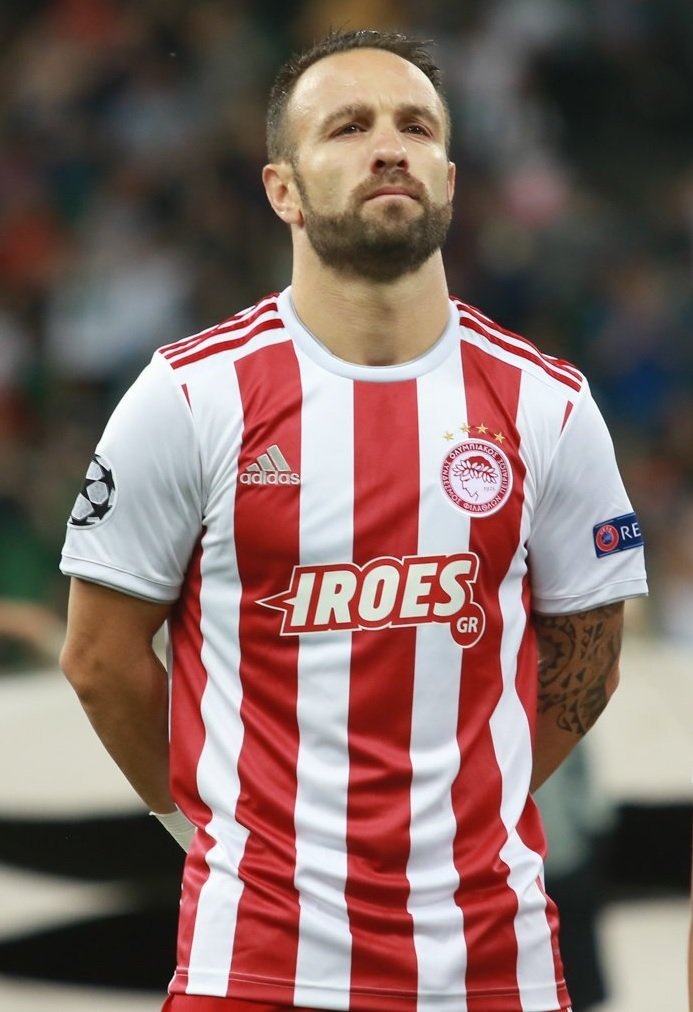
Mathieu Valbuena

- Kenny Lala – Olympiacos – 2021–2023
- Loïck Landre – A.E. Kifisia – 2023–2024
- Maxim Laroque – OFI – 2007–2008
- Anthony Le Tallec – Atromitos – 2015–2017
- Damien Le Tallec – AEK Athens – 2021–2022
- Jean-Baptiste Léo – PAS Giannina, Panserraikos – 2018–2021, 2022―2026
- Dorian Lévêque – PAOK – 2017–2019
- Tom Louchet – PAOK – 2026–
- Cyriaque Louvion – Ergotelis – 2015

M

- Salem M'Bakata – Aris – 2022–2023
- Yann M'Vila – Olympiacos – 2020–2023
- Zinédine Machach – Ionikos – 2022–2023
- Laurent Macquet – Akratitos – 2005–2006
- Jérémy Malherbe – Panionios – 2018–2020
- Nicolas Marin – Skoda Xanthi – 2012–2014
- Anthony Martial – AEK Athens – 2024–2025
- Johan Martial – Panetolikos – 2019–2020
- Youl Mawéné – Panserraikos – 2010–2011
- Soualiho Meïté – PAOK – 2023–2024, 2025–
- Camel Meriem – Aris – 2010
- Clément Michelin – AEK Athens – 2021–2022
- François Modesto – Olympiacos – 2010–2013
- Yohan Mollo – Panathinaikos – 2019–2021
- Cedric Montabord – Ionikos – 2002–2004
- Youssef Moughfire – Panachaiki – 2002–2004
- Hervaine Moukam – Asteras Tripolis – 2014–2016
- Thibault Moulin – PAOK, Xanthi – 2018–2020
- Anthony Mounier – Panathinaikos, Panetolikos, Apollon Smyrnis – 2017–2021

N

- Olivier N'Siabamfumu – AEK Athens – 2009
- David Ngog – Panionios – 2016–2017
- Béni Nkololo – Panetolikos – 2025–2026

O

- David Oberhauser – Platanias – 2017–2018

P

- Fabrice Pancrate – AEL – 2011
- Jacques-Olivier Paviot – Skoda Xanthi, Ionikos, Levadiakos – 2004–2008
- Jeremy Petris – Aris – 2026–
- Marc Pfertzel – Kavala – 2011
- Samuel Piètre – Levadiakos – 2007–2008
- Damien Plessis – Panathinaikos – 2010–2012
- Antoine Préget – Panionios – 2000–2001
- Jérôme Prior – PAS Giannina – 2022–2023

Q

R

- Alain Raguel – Panionios, Panathinaikos, Chalkidona, Atromitos, Iraklis – 2000–2008
- Gaëtan Robail – Atromitos – 2022–2024
- Bertrand Robert – Panthrakikos, PAOK – 2009–2013
- Laurent Robert – AEL – 2008–2009

S

- Wajdi Sahli – Apollon Smyrnis – 2021–2022
- Joris Sainati – Ergotelis – 2014–2015
- Amadou Sanokho – Atromitos – 2006–2008
- Baptiste Santamaria – PAOK – 2026–
- Anthony Scaramozzino – Panetolikos – 2015
- Morgan Schneiderlin – A.E. Kifisia – 2023–2024
- Sonhy Sefil – Asteras Tripolis – 2016–2017
- Gianni Seraf – Panionios – 2018–2019
- Djibril Sidibé – AEK Athens – 2022–2024
- Mohamadou Sissoko – Veria – 2013–2014, 2016–2017
- Moussa Sissoko – Panathinaikos – 2026–
- Olivier Sorlin – PAOK – 2009–2010
- Samba Sow – Akratitos – 2005–2006
- Harouna Sy – Volos – 2023
- Salimo Sylla – Xanthi – 2016–2019

T

- Kevin Tapoko – Panionios – 2017–2018
- Steven Thicot – AEL – 2017
- Xavier Tomas – Olympiacos Volos, Levadiakos – 2010–2012, 2014–2015
- Yves Triantafyllos – Olympiacos – 1971–1974
- Alexis Trouillet – Panathinaikos, Volos – 2022–2025

U

- Kendal Ucar – Ionikos, OFI, Platanias – 2002–2003, 2011–2013

V

- Mathieu Valbuena – Olympiacos, Athens Kallithea – 2019–2023, 2024–2025
- Patrick Valéry – Aris – 2001–2002
- Cédric Varrault – Panionios – 2010–2011
- Grégory Vignal – Atromitos – 2010
- Jody Viviani – Skoda Xanthi – 2011–2013

W

X

Y

- Samuel Yohou – OFI – 2022–2023
- Kévin Yoke – Levadiakos – 2024–2025

Z

=== Georgia (Georgia (country)) ===
- Bachana Arabuli – Panionios, Lamia – 2019–2022
- Iva Gelashvili – Panserraikos – 2025–2026
- Luka Gugeshashvili – Panserraikos, PAOK, Atromitos – 2024–
- Petr Gusev – Aris – 2012–2013
- Levan Kebadze – PAS Giannina, Iraklis – 2000–2003
- Temur Ketsbaia – AEK Athens – 1994–1997
- Akaki Khubutia – Kerkyra – 2015
- Davit Kvirkvelia – Panionios – 2011–2012
- Nugzar Lobzhanidze – Skoda Xanthi – 1998–1999
- Giorgi Loria – OFI, Olympiacos – 2014–2015
- Levan Maghradze – Skoda Xanthi – 2004–2007
- Giorgi Merebashvili – OFI, Veria, Levadiakos – 2014–2016
- Amiran Mujiri – Kallithea – 2005–2006
- Goderdzi Natroshvili – Panachaiki – 1999–2001
- Giorgi Navalovski – Veria – 2016–2017
- Nika Ninua – PAOK, Lamia – 2020–2024
- Guga Palavandishvili – Lamia – 2020–2021
- Giorgi Popkhadze – Olympiacos – 2006
- Giorgi Rekhviashvili – Levadiakos – 2019
- Giorgi Shashiashvili – Ergotelis – 2009–2012
- Levan Shengelia – Panetolikos, OFI – 2022–2026
- Lasha Shergelashvili – PAS Giannina – 2019–2020
- Jemal Tabidze – Panetolikos – 2024
- Levan Tskitishvili – Panionios – 2006–2007
- Irakli Vashakidze – Aris – 2004

=== Germany ===
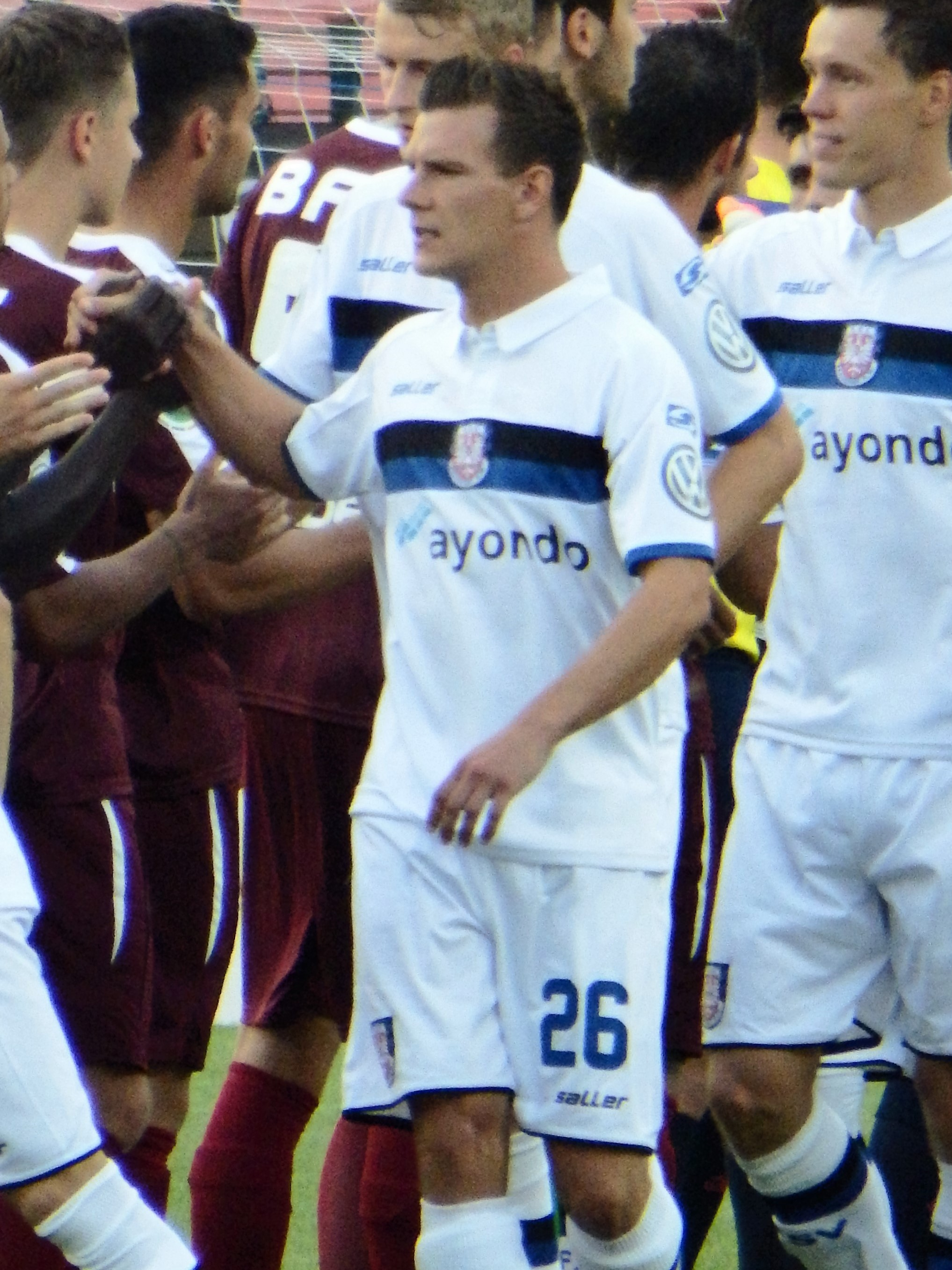
Denis Epstein

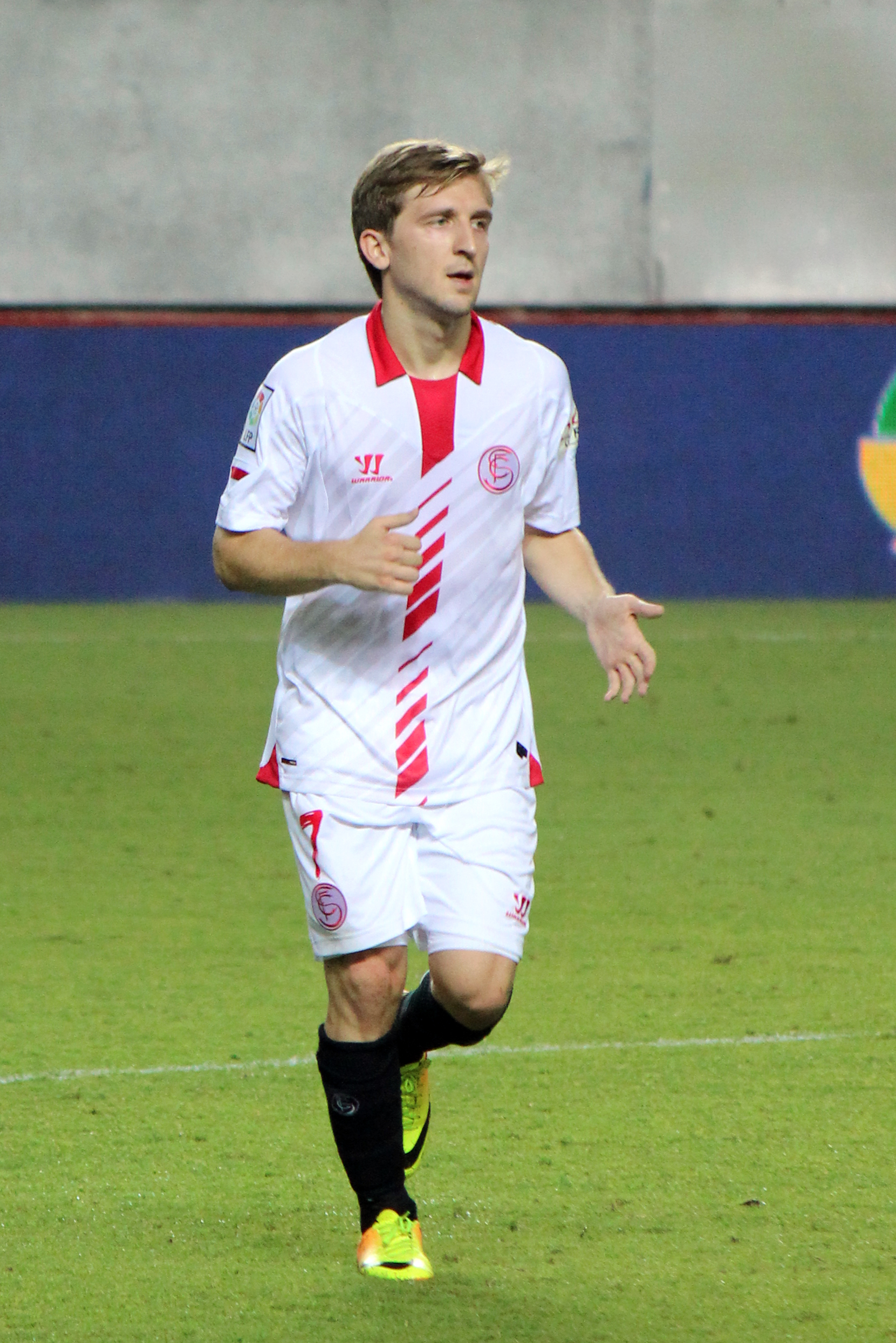
Marko Marin

- Antonis Aidonis – Aris – 2023
- Makana Baku – OFI, Atromitos – 2024–2026
- Mario Block – Panachaiki – 1997–1998
- Christopher Braun – OFI – 2019–2020
- Thomas Cichon – Panionios – 2005
- Michael Delura – Panionios – 2007–2009
- Ahmet Engin – Volos – 2023–2024
- Denis Epstein – Iraklis, Olympiacos, Kerkyra, Atromitos, Lamia – 2008–2013, 2016–2019
- Justin Eilers – Apollon Smyrnis – 2018–2019
- Marco Förster – AEL – 2005–2008
- Michael Gardawski – PAS Giannina, Asteras Tripolis – 2021–2023
- Fabian Gerber – OFI – 2007–2009
- Sean Goss – Asteras Tripolis – 2023–2025
- Joel Abu Hanna – Levadiakos – 2025–2026
- Walter Kelsch – Apollon Athens – 1988–1989
- Jochen Kientz – Panionios – 2000
- Matthias Langkamp – Panionios – 2008–2009
- Hans-Peter Lipka – Aris – 1988–1989
- Marko Marin – Olympiacos – 2016–2018
- Ivica Majstorović – Panionios, PAS Giannina, Kerkyra – 2007–2012
- Philipp Max – Panathinaikos – 2024–2026
- Alberto Méndez – AEK Athens – 1999
- Markus Münch – Panathinaikos – 2003–2005
- Khaled Narey – PAOK – 2022–2023
- Herbert Neumann – Olympiacos – 1983–1984
- Robert Niestroj – Iraklis – 2000–2001
- Eric Noll – Ionikos – 2002–2003
- Marc Oechler – Kavala – 1999–2000
- Reagy Ofosu – Ionikos – 2022–2023
- Stefan Ortega – Olympiacos – 2026–
- Oliver Otto – Akratitos – 2001–2002
- Karlheinz Pflipsen – Panathinaikos – 1999–2001
- Sören Pirson – Ergotelis – 2011–2012
- Andreas Reinke – Iraklis – 2000–2001
- Louis Poznański – PAS Giannina – 2022–2023
- Markus Pröll – Panionios – 2011
- Denis Epstein – Ethnikos Piraeus, Olympiacos – 1975–1980
- Lukas Rupp – Aris – 2023–2024
- Lars Schlichting – Ergotelis – 2004–2005
- Sebastian Schindzielorz – Levadiakos – 2007–2008
- Jan-Marc Schneider – PAS Giannina – 2021–2022
- Elvir Smajlović – Skoda Xanthi – 2000–2001
- Manuel Stiefler – AEL – 2021
- Holger Trimhold – PAOK – 1982–1984
- Esad Veledar – Panionios – 2005–2006
- Marco Villa – Panathinaikos – 2000–2001
- Walter Wagner – AEK Athens, Aris, Panathinaikos, Panachaiki – 1974–1979, 1980–1981
- Christian Weber – AEL – 2008–2009
- Jens Wemmer – Panathinaikos – 2015–2017
- Timo Wenzel – Kerkyra – 2011–2012
- Samed Yeşil – Panionios – 2017–2018
- Timo Zahnleiter – AEK Athens – 1974–1977

=== Hungary ===
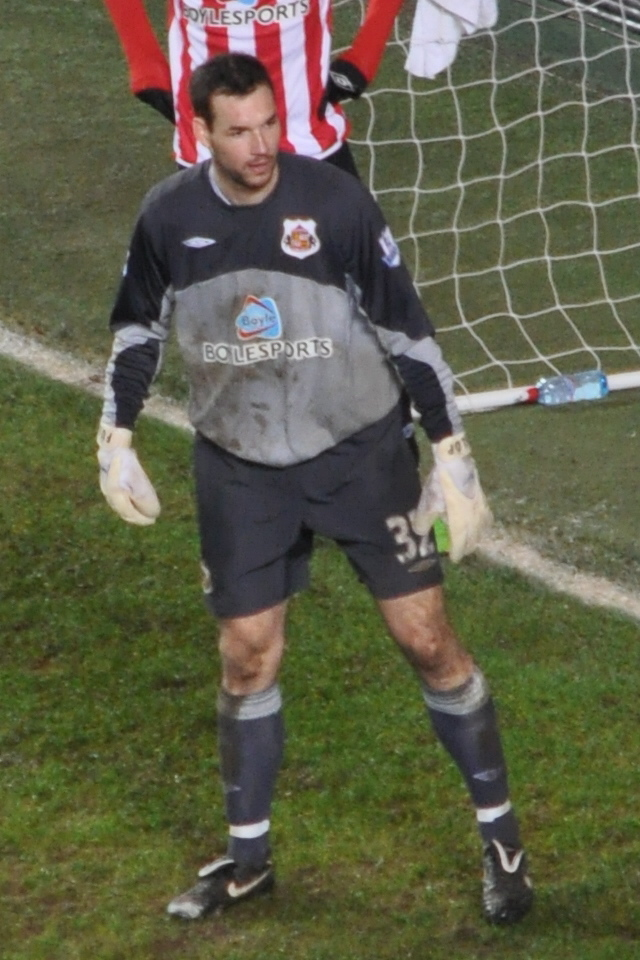
Márton Fülöp

- Martin Ádám – Asteras Tripolis – 2024
- Imre Boda – Olympiacos Volos, OFI – 1988–1992
- Boldizsár Bodor – OFI – 2011–2012
- Peter Dani – Kallithea – 2003
- Lajos Détári – Olympiacos – 1988–1990
- Gábor Erős – Doxa Drama – 2011–2012
- Márton Esterházy – AEK Athens, Panathinaikos – 1984–1988
- József Fitos – Panathinaikos, Panionios – 1988–1990
- Márton Fülöp – Asteras Tripolis – 2012–2013
- Dávid Gróf – Levadiakos – 2023, 2024–2025
- Sándor Gujdár – Aris – 1982–1984
- József Kardos – Apollon Kalamarias – 1988–1989
- Imre Katzenbach – Apollon Athens – 1989–1994
- Zoltán Kiss – Panserraikos – 2011
- László Kleinheisler – Panathinaikos – 2023–2025
- András Komjáti – Pierikos – 1984–1985
- Márk Koszta – Volos – 2024–2025
- Mihály Korhut – Aris – 2019–2020
- György Korsós – Skoda Xanthi – 2006–2007
- Dániel Kovács – Volos – 2024–2025
- Zoltán Kovács – PAOK – 1998
- Zsolt Laczkó – Olympiacos, Levadiakos – 2007
- László Lencse – Asteras Tripolis – 2013
- Balázs Megyeri – Olympiacos, Atromitos – 2010–2015, 2018–2020
- Dominik Nagy – Panathinaikos – 2020
- Gergely Nagy – AEL, Lamia, PAS Giannina – 2020–2021, 2023–2024
- Krisztián Németh – Olympiacos, AEK Athens, Olympiacos Volos – 2009–2012
- Péter Orosz – OFI – 2008
- Ádám Pintér – Levadiakos – 2014–2015
- Gyula Plotár – Aris – 1989–1990
- Krisztián Pogacsics – Panionios – 2012
- Zsolt Posza – Ergotelis – 2006–2010
- Gergely Rudolf – Panathinaikos – 2011–2012
- József Szabó – Iraklis, Apollon Kalamarias – 1985–1987, 1988
- Zoltán Szélesi – Olympiacos Volos – 2010–2011
- Norbert Tóth – Panionios – 2003–2004
- Sándor Torghelle – Panathinaikos, PAOK – 2005–2007
- Dániel Tőzsér – AEK Athens – 2006–2008
- Roland Ugrai – Atromitos – 2010–2015, 2018–2020
- Barnabás Varga – AEK Athens – 2026–
- Paulo Vinícius – Levadiakos – 2022–2023
- Milán Vitális – AEK Athens – 2026–
- József Windecker – Levadiakos – 2018–2019

=== Iceland ===
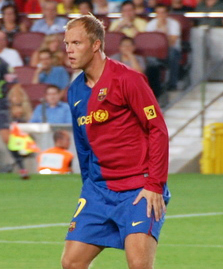
Eiður Guðjohnsen

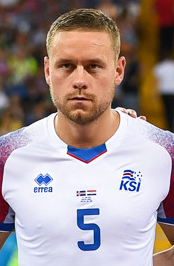
Sverrir Ingi Ingason

- Theódór Elmar Bjarnason – Lamia – 2021
- Baldur Bragason – Panachaiki – 1998
- Ríkharður Daðason – Kalamata – 1996–1997
- Einar Daníelsson – OFI – 1999
- Alfreð Finnbogason – Olympiacos – 2015–2016
- Samúel Friðjónsson – Atromitos – 2022–2024
- Arnar Grétarsson – AEK Athens – 1997–2000
- Sigurður Grétarsson – Iraklis – 1984–1985
- Eiður Guðjohnsen – AEK Athens – 2011–2012
- Páll Eysteinn Gudmundsson – Ionikos – 1998
- Elfar Freyr Helgason – AEK Athens – 2011–2012
- Hjörtur Hermannsson – Volos – 2025–2026
- Sverrir Ingi Ingason – PAOK, Panathinaikos – 2019–2023, 2024–
- Viðar Örn Kjartansson – Atromitos – 2022–2023
- Ögmundur Kristinsson – AEL, Olympiacos, A.E. Kifisia – 2018–2024
- Hörður Björgvin Magnússon – Panathinaikos, Levadiakos,Atromitos – 2022–
- Davíð Kristján Ólafsson – AEL – 2026
- Kristófer Sigurgeirsson – Aris – 1999
- Arnór Sigurðsson – Kalamata – 2026–
- Helgi Sigurðsson – Panathinaikos – 1999–2001
- Kristinn Tómasson – Ionikos – 1998
- Arnór Ingvi Traustason – AEK Athens – 2017
- Guðmundur Þórarinsson – OFI – 2022–2024

=== Israel ===
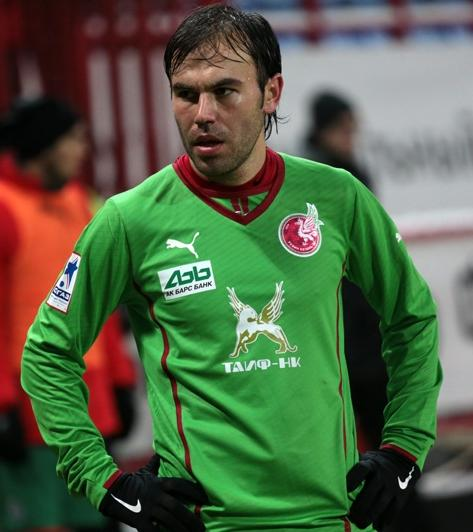
Bibras Natcho

- Shimon Abuhatzira – AEL – 2009–2011
- Omri Altman – Panathinaikos, Volos – 2017–2019, 2024–
- Aviv Avraham – Levadiakos – 2025
- Eli Elbaz – Apollon Smyrnis – 2017–2018
- Niv Eliasi – Levadiakos – 2026–
- Dan Glazer – OFI – 2023–2024
- Eyal Golasa – PAOK – 2014–2016
- Tal Kachila – Atromitos – 2019–2020
- Boris Klaiman – Volos, PAS Giannina – 2020–2024
- Hisham Layous – Levadiakos – 2025–
- Doron Leidner – Olympiacos – 2022–
- Goni Naor – AEL – 2026
- Bibras Natcho – PAOK, Olympiacos – 2014, 2018–2019
- Asael Ben Shabat – Panthrakikos, Kerkyra – 2014–2015
- Salim Tuama – AEL – 2009–2010

=== Italy ===
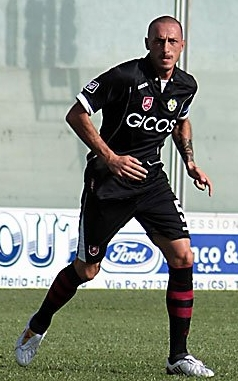
Bruno Cirillo

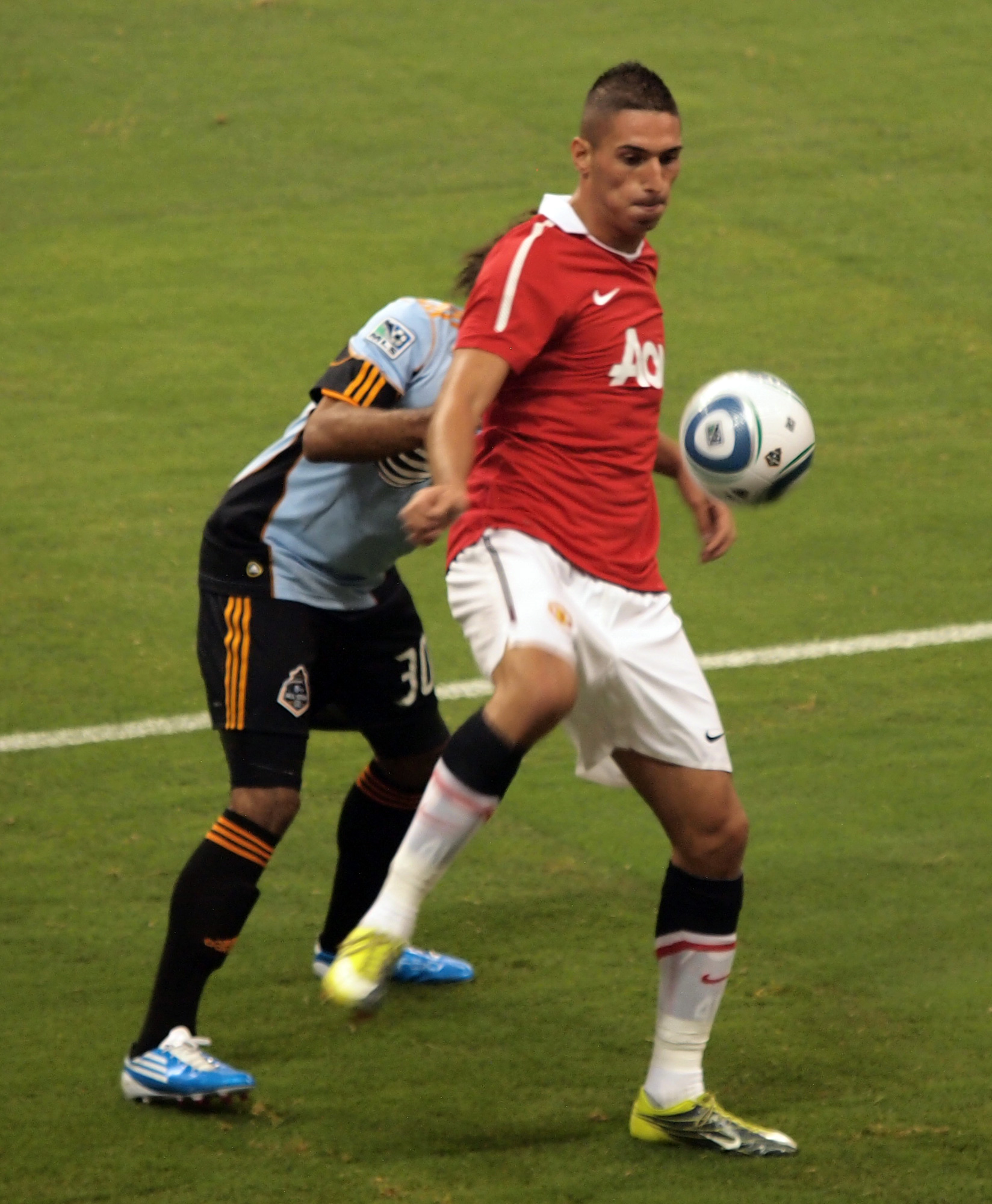
Federico Macheda

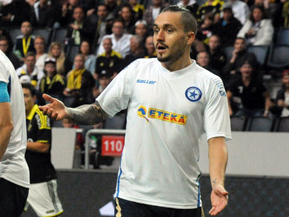
Stefano Napoleoni

- Cristian Battocchio – Volos – 2022–2023
- Davide Belotti – AEK Athens – 2000
- Alessandro Bianco – PAOK – 2025–
- Massimo Bonanni – Panachaiki – 2002–2003
- Alberto Brignoli – Panathinaikos, AEK Athens – 2021–
- Davide Calabria – Panathinaikos – 2025–
- Antonio Calascibetta – Skoda Xanthi – 2004–2005
- Luigi Cennamo – Olympiacos, Proodeftiki, Egaleo, Panetolikos, Skoda Xanthi, Atromitos – 1997–1999, 2003–2007, 2011–2012, 2013–2016, 2017–2018
- Bruno Cirillo – AEK Athens, PAOK – 2005–2007, 2009–2012
- Christian D'Urso – Apollon Smyrnis – 2018–2019
- Filippo Dal Moro – AEK Athens – 2000
- Samuele Dalla Bona – Iraklis – 2009–2010
- Giorgio Del Signore – Egaleo – 2001–2002
- Lorenzo Dickmann – OFI – 2026–
- Antonio Donnarumma – Asteras Tripolis – 2016–2017
- Nicolao Dumitru – Veria – 2014–2015
- Elia Giani – Athens Kallithea – 2024–2025
- Davide Grassi – Kerkyra – 2018
- Leandro Greco – Olympiacos – 2012–2013
- Christian Konan – Panathinaikos – 2019–2021
- Nicola Leali – Olympiacos – 2016–2017
- Cristian Ledesma – Panathinaikos – 2016–2017
- Samuele Longo – Lamia – 2023–2024
- Federico Macheda – Panathinaikos, Asteras Tripolis – 2018–2022, 2024–
- Gabriele Marchegiani – Atromitos – 2023–2024
- Enzo Maresca – Olympiacos – 2009–2010
- Lorenzo Menicagli – Kerkyra – 2018
- Alessandro Mercati – Athens Kallithea – 2024–2025
- Giandomenico Mesto – Panathinaikos – 2016–2017
- Gaetano Monachello – Ergotelis – 2014
- Giancorrado Montoneri – Athinaikos – 2000–2001
- Emanuele Morini – Panachaiki – 2002–2003
- Stefano Napoleoni – Levadiakos, Atromitos – 2009–2010, 2011–2016
- Massimo Paganin – Akratitos – 2005–2006
- Lorenzo Pirola – Olympiacos – 2024–
- Vincenzo Rennella – Xanthi – 2019–2020
- Eddie Salcedo – OFI – 2024–2026
- Andrea Sandri – Kavala – 1999–2000
- Mirko Savini – PAOK – 2009–2011
- Francesco Scardina – PAOK – 2002
- Giuseppe Signori – Iraklis – 2004–2005
- Stefano Sorrentino – AEK Athens – 2005–2007
- Mirko Taccola – PAOK – 1998–2000
- Emanuele Troise – Panthrakikos – 2008–2010
- Paolo Vanoli – Akratitos – 2005–2006
- Ivan Varone – Panetolikos – 2021–2023
- Daniele Verde – AEK Athens – 2019–2020
- Emanuel Vignato – AEL – 2025–2026
- Alessandro Vogliacco – PAOK – 2025–

=== Kazakhstan ===
- Evstaphiy Pechlevanidis – Levadiakos – 1990–1991

=== Kosovo ===
- Mërgim Brahimi – Panionios – 2018
- Zymer Bytyqi – Olympiacos – 2023
- Suad Sahiti – AEL – 2018–2019

=== Latvia ===
- Kaspars Gorkšs – Ergotelis – 2015
- Jānis Ikaunieks – AEL – 2017
- Roberts Uldriķis – Athens Kallithea – 2024–2025
- Māris Verpakovskis – Ergotelis – 2013–2014

=== Lithuania ===
- Deividas Česnauskis – Ergotelis, Aris – 2009–2012
- Gražvydas Mikulėnas – Akratitos – 2002–2004
- Tomas Ražanauskas – Akratitos – 2002–2004
- Artūras Rimkevičius – Asteras Tripolis – 2010–2011
- Ernestas Šetkus – Kerkyra – 2014–2015
- Vykintas Slivka – Apollon Smyrnis, Lamia – 2020–2024
- Gintaras Staučė – Akratitos – 2001–2002
- Raimondas Žutautas – Panathinaikos – 2003–2005

=== Luxembourg ===
- Vahid Selimović – OFI – 2020–2022

=== Malta ===
- Matthew Guillaumier – Panserraikos – 2025–2026
- Justin Haber – Kerkyra – 2011–2012
- Andrew Hogg – AEL Kalloni – 2013–2016
- Udo Nwoko – Panthrakikos – 2009–2010
- André Schembri – Olympiacos Volos, Panionios – 2011–2012

=== Moldova ===
- Stanislav Namașco – Lamia – 2018
- Roman Bolbocian – Skoda Xanthi, Asteras Tripolis – 2005–2008
- Viorel Frunză – PAOK – 2008
- Dinu Graur – AEL – 2021
- Alexei Koșelev – Lamia, Atromitos, Volos – 2023–
- Nicolae Milinceanu – PAS Giannina – 2021–2022
- Andrei Motoc – Athens Kallithea – 2024–2025
- Stanislav Namașco – Levadiakos – 2016–2018
- Oleg Reabciuk – Olympiacos – 2021–2023
- Victor Stînă – Panserraikos – 2023–2024

=== Montenegro ===
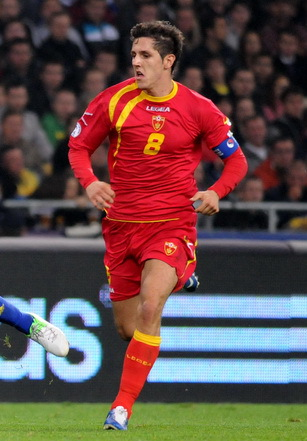
Stevan Jovetić

- Božidar Bandović – Olympiacos, Ethnikos Piraeus, Paniliakos, PAOK, Ethnikos Asteras – 1994–2002
- Marko Bakić – OFI – 2023–2025
- Miladin Bečanović – Iraklis – 1993–1995
- Srđan Blažić – Levadiakos, Panetolikos – 2007–2010, 2011–2012
- Goran Bošković – Apollon Athens – 1993–1994
- Mladen Božović – AEL – 2017–2018
- Andrija Delibašić – AEK Athens – 2006
- Žarko Dragaš – Ethnikos Asteras – 1998–1999
- Žarko Drašković – Ethnikos Piraeus – 1995–1996
- Davor Jakovljević – Levadiakos, Ethnikos Asteras – 1993–1994, 1998–1999
- Marko Janković – Olympiacos – 2013–2014
- Stevan Jovetić – Olympiacos – 2023–2024
- Igor Gluščević – Aris – 1999–2000
- Petar Grbić – Olympiacos, Levadiakos – 2011–2012
- Filip Kasalica – Platanias – 2018
- Mladen Kašćelan – Panthrakikos – 2012–2013
- Srđan Kljajević – Panachaiki, Egaleo – 2002–2005
- Zlatko Kostić – Panachaiki – 1999
- Danko Kovačević – Doxa Drama – 2012
- Radovan Krivokapić – Veria – 2007–2008
- Željko Leković – Doxa Drama – 1993–1996
- Petar Ljumović – Doxa Drama – 1984–1986
- Aleksa Maraš – Panserraikos – 2025–2026
- Milan Mešter – Panachaiki – 1999–2000
- Savo Pavićević – Kavala – 2009–2010
- Balša Popović – Olympiacos – 2026–
- Dragan Radojičić – Aris, Kavala – 1999–2000
- Marko Radonjić – Kavala – 1998–1999
- Mojaš Radonjić – AEK Athens – 1981–1983
- Marko Rakonjac – OFI – 2025–2026
- Nebojša Šćepanović – Paniliakos – 1998
- Vojimir Sinđic – Paniliakos – 1996–1997
- Nikola Šipčić – Asteras Tripolis – 2025–
- Saša Škara – Edessaikos, Athinaikos – 1992–1994, 1996–1997
- Mićo Smiljanić – Panionios – 2003–2006
- Darko Šuškavčević – Panionios – 2003–2004
- Aleksandar Vlahović – Panionios – 1994–1995
- Slobodan Vučeković – Doxa Drama – 1981–1984
- Rajko Vujadinović – Doxa Drama, Panachaiki – 1984–1986, 1987–1988
- Nikola Vujović – Akratitos – 2005–2006
- Nenad Vukčević – Panachaiki – 1999–2003
- Simon Vukčević – Levadiakos – 2014–2015
- Ilija Vukotić – OFI – 2025–2026
- Ranko Zirojević – Ethnikos Piraeus – 1994–1995
- Darko Zorić – AEK Athens – 2015–2017

=== Netherlands ===
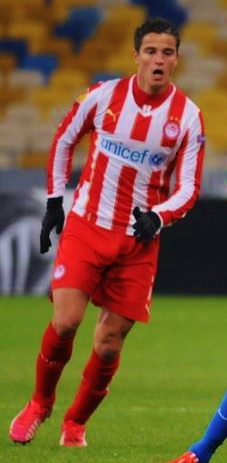
Ibrahim Afellay

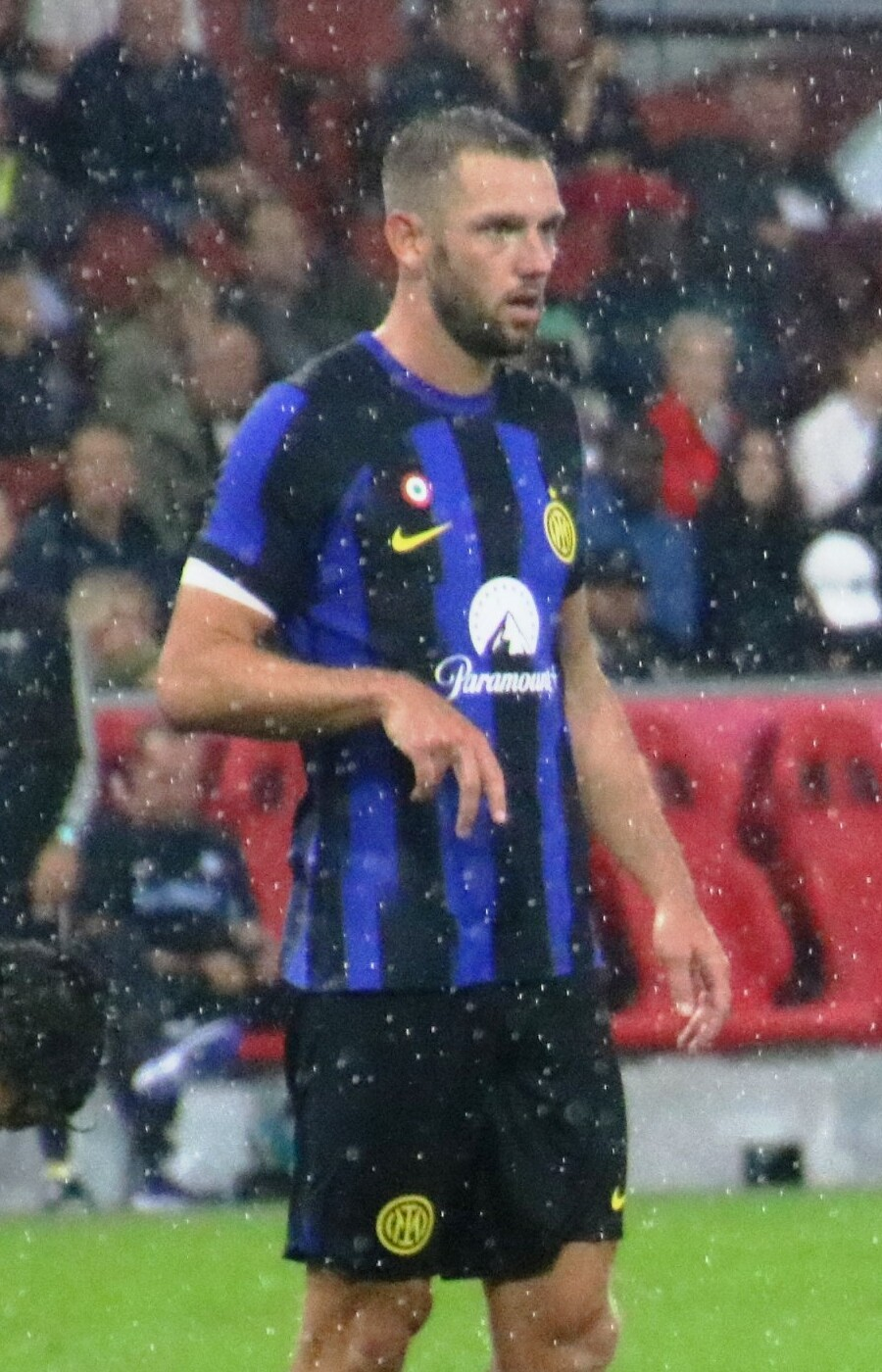
Stefan de Vrij

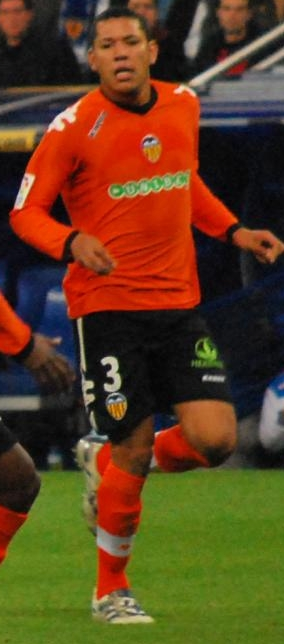
Hedwiges Maduro

- Ibrahim Afellay – Olympiacos – 2014–2015
- Derek Agyakwa – Volos – 2026–
- Samir Ben Sallam – Panserraikos – 2026
- George Boateng – Skoda Xanthi – 2010–2011
- Remco Boere – Iraklis – 1989–1991
- Luc Castaignos – OFI – 2021–2022
- David Mendes da Silva – Panathinaikos – 2013–2015
- Jonathan de Guzmán – OFI – 2020–2022
- Joeri de Kamps – Volos – 2024–2025
- Paul de Lange – Veria – 2007–2008
- Stefan de Vrij – Panathinaikos – 2026–
- Lerin Duarte – Aris – 2019–2022
- Youssouf Hersi – AEK Athens – 2009–2010
- Danny Hoesen – PAOK – 2014
- Melvin Holwijn – Iraklis – 2003–2004
- Leandro Kappel – Doxa Drama, Panetolikos– 2011–2012, 2014–2016
- Ruud Knol – PAOK – 2007–2008
- Richard Knopper – Aris – 2002–2003
- Michel Kreek – AEK Athens – 2002–2004
- Nicky Kuiper – Panathinaikos – 2013
- Tschen La Ling – Panathinaikos – 1982–1984
- Toshio Lake – Lamia – 2023–2025
- Boban Lazić – Olympiacos – 2014–2015
- Kees Luijckx – Niki Volos – 2014–2015
- Nassir Maachi – Apollon Smyrnis – 2017–2018
- Darren Maatsen – Apollon Smyrnis – 2017–2018
- Hedwiges Maduro – PAOK – 2014–2015
- Gabriel Misehouy – Aris – 2025–
- Ché Nunnely – Panserraikos, A.E. Kifisia – 2025–2026
- Daan Rienstra – Volos, PAS Giannina – 2020–2024
- Jeffrey Sarpong – Veria, Xanthi – 2016–2017, 2018–2019
- Bart Schenkeveld – Panathinaikos – 2019–2025
- Stefano Seedorf – Veria – 2007–2008
- Mark Sifneos – Panathinaikos – 2018–2019
- Jerry Simons – Kalamata, Athinaikos – 1999–2002
- Ian Smeulers – Volos – 2024–2025
- Sonny Stevens – OFI – 2022–2023
- Gaston Taument – OFI – 1999–2000
- Joost Terol – Veria – 2007–2008
- Jordy Tutuarima – Apollon Smyrnis – 2021–2022
- René van de Kerkhof – Apollon Smyrnis – 1983–1984
- Rick van Drongelen – Panathinaikos – 2026–
- Mike van Duinen – OFI – 2021–2022
- Maurice van Ham – PAOK – 1995–1997
- Rajiv van La Parra – Apollon Smyrnis – 2021–2022
- Frans van Rooy – PAOK – 1994–1995
- Tom van Weert – Volos, AEK Athens, Atromitos – 2021―2026
- Dennis van Wijk – PAS Giannina – 1990–1991
- Charlton Vicento – PAS Giannina – 2013–2014
- Tonny Vilhena – Panathinaikos – 2023–2026
- Regilio Vrede – Iraklis – 2002–2003
- Boy Waterman – OFI – 2020–2022
- Nordin Wooter – Panathinaikos – 2004–2006

=== North Macedonia ===
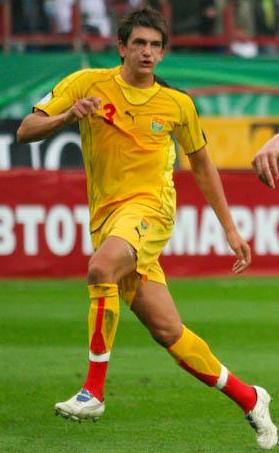
Goran Popov

- Ali Adem – Aris – 2020–2021
- Marjan Altiparmakovski – Skoda Xanthi – 2010–2013
- Stefan Ashkovski – Lamia – 2022–2023
- Jani Atanasov – AEL – 2025–2026
- Boban Babunski – AEK Athens – 1998–1999
- Zoran Baldovaliev – Kerkyra – 2013–2014
- Risto Božinov – OFI – 1996–1998
- Aguinaldo Braga – Aris, Kerkyra – 2002–2003, 2004–2005
- Mite Cikarski – PAS Giannina – 2018
- Dragi Dimitrovski – Apollon Kalamarias – 1988–1989
- Vladimir Dimitrovski – Kerkyra – 2014–2015
- Jane Gavalovski – PAS Giannina – 2003
- Blanko Georgiev – Iraklis – 1983–1988
- Vlatko Gošev – PAS Giannina – 2002–2003
- Mirsad Jonuz – Levadiakos – 1989–1990, 1993–1995
- Sašo Karadžov – Iraklis – 1998–1999
- Jovan Kostovski – OFI – 2008–2009
- Mile Krstev – Athinaikos – 1997–1998
- Sašo Krstev – Athinaikos – 1997–1998
- Ljupčo Lazarov – Veria – 1997
- Sandro Manevski – PAS Giannina – 1983–1987
- Goran Maznov – Kerkyra – 2011–2012
- Blagoja Milevski – Paniliakos – 1997–1998
- Dragan Načevski – Ergotelis – 2005–2008
- Tome Pachovski – Ionikos – 2004
- Robert Petrov – Panserraikos – 2008
- Goran Popov – Proodeftiki, AEK Athens, Egaleo, Levadiakos – 2003–2004, 2005–2008
- Elmin Rastoder – Panathinaikos – 2026–
- Toni Savevski – AEK Athens – 1988–2001
- Dragi Setinov – Ethnikos Piraeus – 1991–1992
- Vanče Šikov – Skoda Xanthi, Olympiacos, Apollon Kalamarias – 2003–2006, 2007–2008
- Dragan Simeunović – Apollon Kalamarias, Olympiacos Volos – 1983–1985, 1986–1990
- Metodija Stepanovski – Ionikos – 2004–2005
- Dragan Stojkov – Egaleo – 2008
- Davor Taleski – AEL – 2019
- Stojanče Zlatanovski – PAS Giannina – 1990–1991

=== Northern Ireland ===
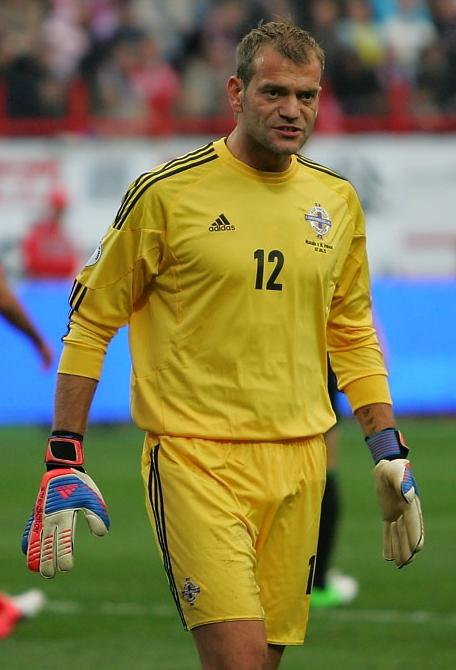
Roy Carroll

- Roy Carroll – OFI, Olympiacos – 2011–2014
- Derek Spence – Olympiacos – 1978

=== Norway ===
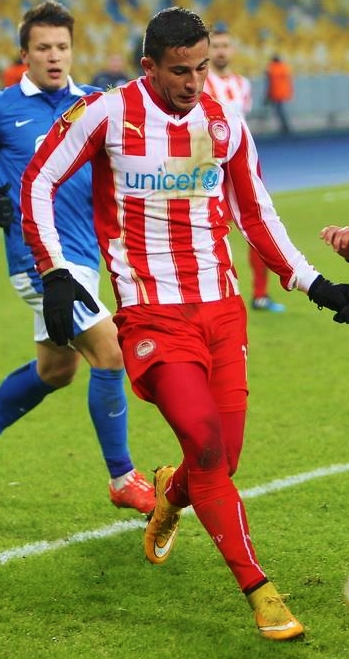
Omar Elabdellaoui

- Roger Albertsen – Olympiacos – 1982–1985
- Paal Christian Alsaker – Ionikos – 1999–2000
- Lars Bakkerud – Panionios – 1998–1999
- Kent Bergersen – Panionios – 1997–1999
- Tore André Dahlum – Skoda Xanthi – 1996–1997
- Arne Dokken – Panathinaikos, Apollon Athens – 1981–1984
- Omar Elabdellaoui – Olympiacos – 2014–2020
- Tarik Elyounoussi – Olympiacos – 2016–2017
- Trond Inge Haugland – Ionikos – 1999–2003
- Abdisalam Ibrahim – Olympiacos, Ergotelis, Veria – 2014–2016
- Jan Erlend Kruse – Panionios – 1998–1999
- Lloyd Lislevand – OFI – 1989–1991
- Arne Møller – Aris – 1988–1990
- Erik Mykland – Panathinaikos – 1997–2000
- Ivan Näsberg – PAOK – 2022–2024
- Kjetil Osvold – PAOK – 1988–1990
- Marcus Holmgren Pedersen – Olympiacos – 2026–
- Adrian Pereira – PAOK – 2021–2022
- Thomas Rogne – Apollon Smyrnis – 2022
- Vajebah Sakor – OFI, Lamia – 2019–2021, 2025
- Ola Solbakken – Olympiacos – 2023–2024
- Frank Strandli – Panathinaikos – 1997–1999
- Tom Sundby – Iraklis – 1996–1998
- Kristoffer Velde – Olympiacos – 2024–2025
- Roy Wassberg – Ethnikos Piraeus, Panionios – 1994–1998
- Ghayas Zahid – Panathinaikos – 2019–2020

=== Poland ===
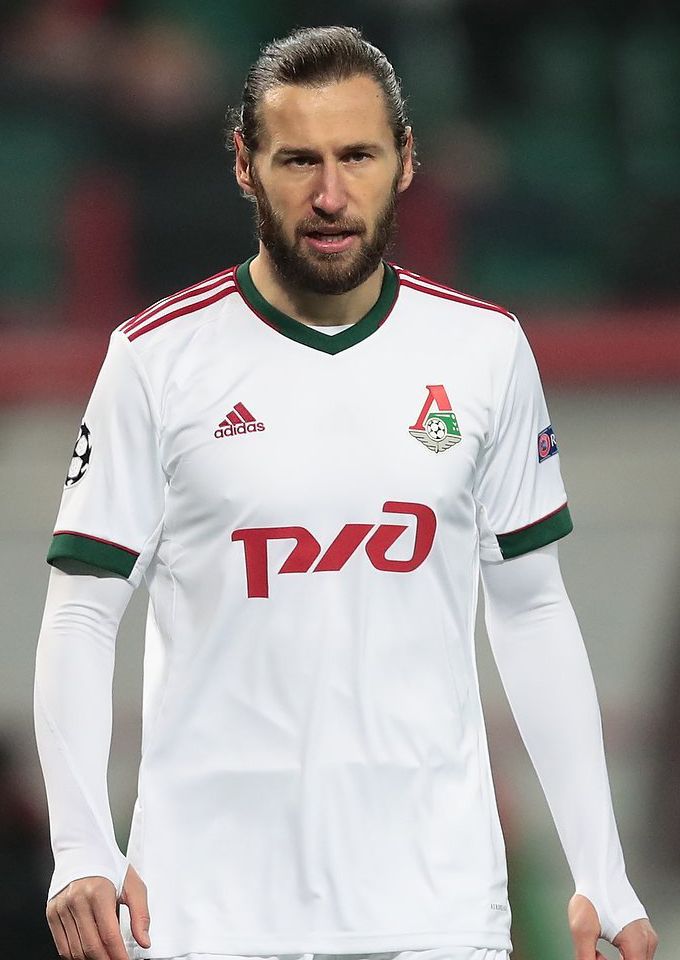
Grzegorz Krychowiak

A

- Krzysztof Adamczyk – AEL – 1984–1987
- Waldemar Adamczyk – Skoda Xanthi, OFI, Apollon Smyrnis – 1997–1999
- Patryk Aleksandrowicz – Kavala – 2010–2011
- Karol Angielski – Atromitos – 2023–2024

B

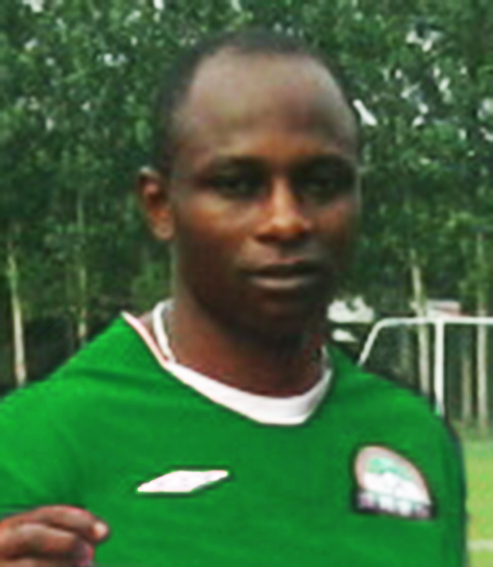
Emanuel Olisadebe

- Bartłomiej Babiarz – Apollon Smyrnis – 2017
- Krzysztof Baran – AEL – 1989–1990
- Marcin Baszczyński – Atromitos – 2009–2011
- Krzysztof Bociek – PAOK – 1994–1995
- Maciej Bykowski – OFI, Panathinaikos, Veria – 2003–2005, 2007–2008

C

- Marek Chojnacki – Ethnikos Piraeus – 1989

D

- Jacek Dąbrowski – Kallithea – 2003–2005
- Józef Dankowski – AEL – 1990–1991
- Bartłomiej Drągowski – Panathinaikos – 2024–2026
- Robert Dymkowski – PAOK – 1996–1997

E

F

- Adam Fedoruk – Kavala – 1997

G

- Rafał Grzelak – Skoda Xanthi – 2008–2009
- Piotr Grzelczak – Platanias – 2017–2018
- Roger Guerreiro – AEK Athens – 2009–2013

H

I

- Andrzej Iwan – Aris – 1990–1991

J

- Radosław Jasiński – Paniliakos – 1998–1999
- Andrzej Juskowiak – Olympiacos – 1995–1996

K

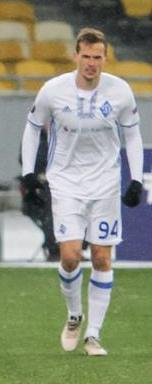
Tomasz Kędziora

- Jan Karaś – AEL – 1989–1990
- Michał Karbownik – Olympiacos – 2021–2022
- Jacek Kazimierski – Olympiacos – 1987–1988
- Tomasz Kędziora – PAOK – 2023–2026
- Paweł Kieszek – Egaleo – 2006
- Arkadiusz Klimek – Panionios – 2003–2004
- Kazimierz Kmiecik – AEL – 1983–1985
- Dawid Kort – Atromitos – 2019
- Wojciech Kowalewski – Iraklis – 2008–2010
- Marek Koźmiński – PAOK – 2002
- Krzysztof Król – AEL Kalloni – 2015–2016
- Grzegorz Krychowiak – AEK Athens – 2022
- Cezary Kucharski – Iraklis – 2003–2004
- Zygmunt Kukla – Apollon Athens – 1981–1983
- Mariusz Kukiełka – PAOK, Skoda Xanthi – 2002–2003, 2009–2010
- Janusz Kupcewicz – AEL – 1985–1986
- Dawid Kurminowski – Kalamata – 2026–
- Mariusz Kurzeja – Athinaikos – 1996–1998
- Marcin Kuźba – Olympiacos – 2003–2004
- Jakub Kuzdra – Volos – 2021

L

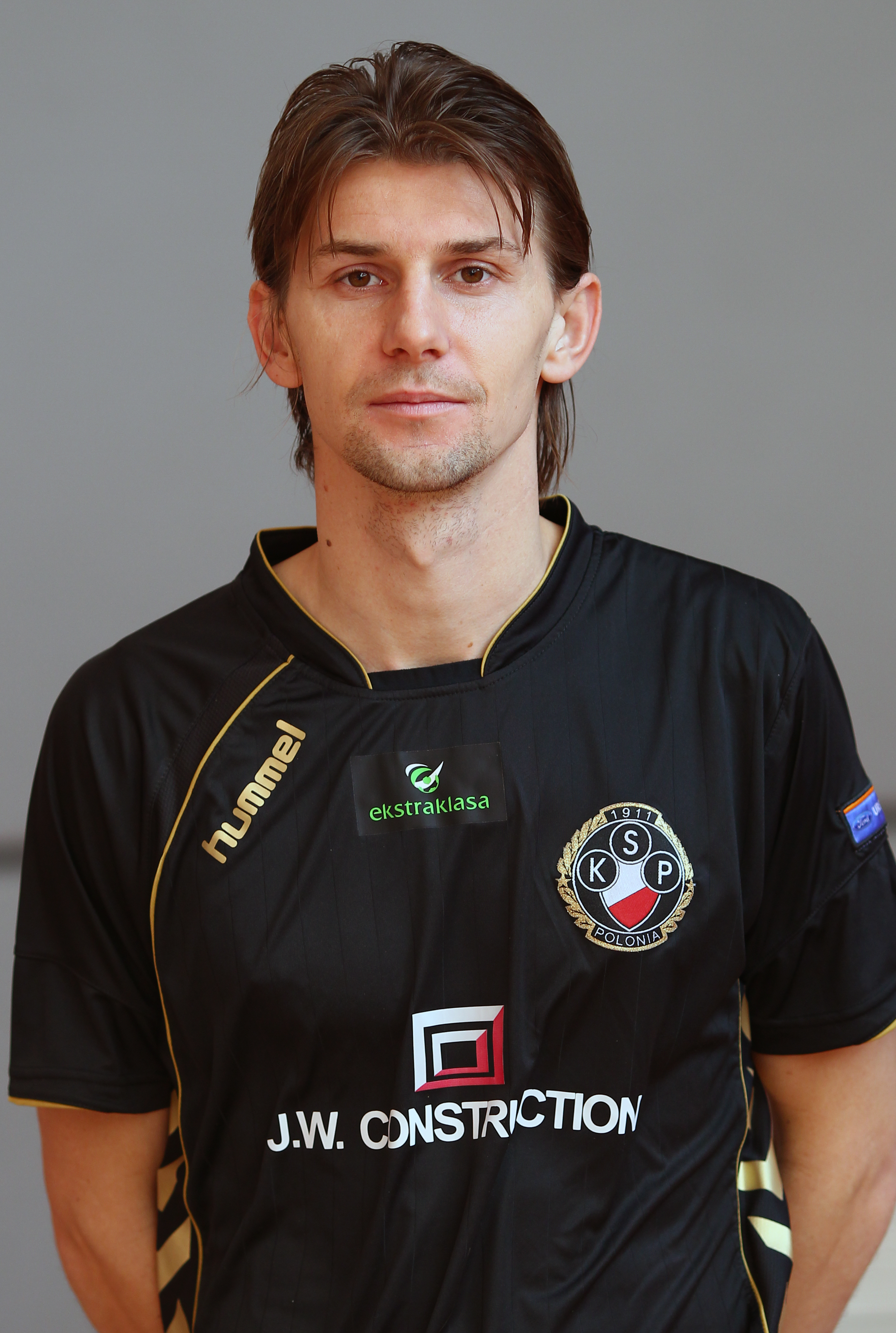
Ebi Smolarek

- Paweł Linka – Skoda Xanthi – 2009

M

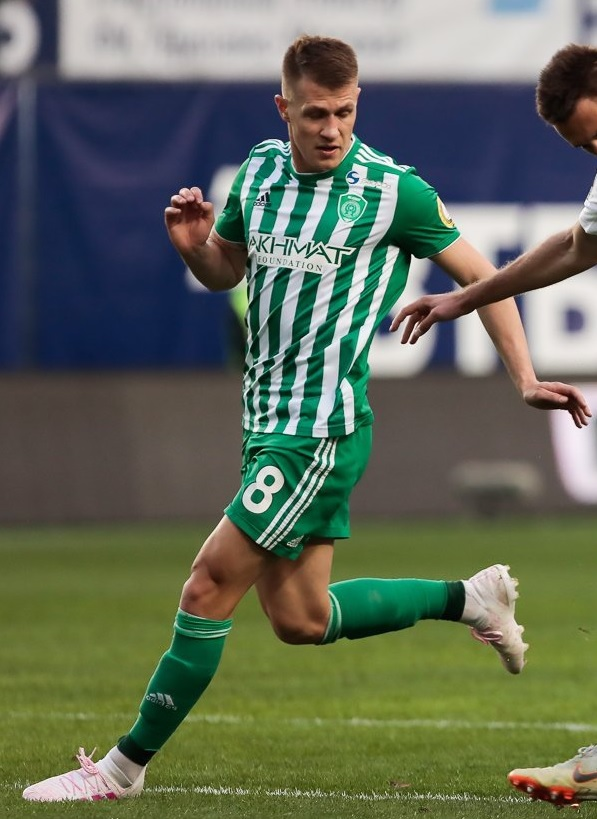
Damian Szymański

- Radosław Majdan – PAOK – 2002–2003
- Adam Majewski – Panionios – 2003–2004
- Radosław Majewski – Veria – 2015–2016
- Arkadiusz Malarz – Skoda Xanthi, Panathinaikos, OFI, AEL – 2006–2010
- Radosław Matusiak – Asteras Tripolis – 2011
- Wiktor Matyjewicz – Athens Kallithea – 2024–2025
- Konrad Michalak – Panetolikos – 2025–2026
- Marcin Mięciel – Iraklis, PAOK – 2002–2007
- Grzegorz Mielcarski – AEK Athens – 2000–2001
- Mariusz Mowlik – Egaleo – 2007
- Maciej Murawski – Aris, Apollon Kalamarias – 2004–2009
- Sebastian Musiolik – A.E. Kifisia – 2025–2026

N

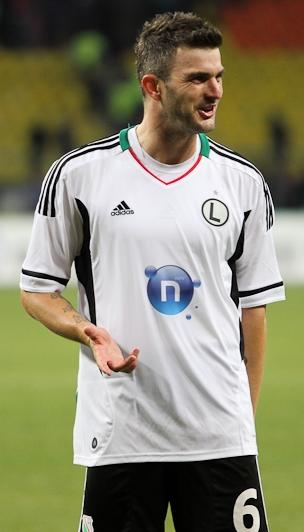
Michał Żewłakow

- Krystian Nowak – Panionios – 2018
- Krzysztof Nowak – Panachaiki – 1995–1996

O

- Mirosław Okoński – AEK Athens, Korinthos – 1988–1992
- Emmanuel Olisadebe – Panathinaikos, Skoda Xanthi – 2001–2007

P

- Fabian Pawela – Chalkidona – 2004–2005
- Rafał Pawlak – Ionikos – 2001–2002
- Piotr Piechniak – Levadiakos – 2009
- Leszek Pisz – PAOK, Kavala, Paniliakos – 1996–2000
- Krzysztof Popczyński – Panionios – 1996
- Sebastian Przyrowski – Levadiakos – 2013–2014
- Tymoteusz Puchacz – Panathinaikos – 2023

Q

R

- Zbigniew Robakiewicz – Iraklis – 1996–1997

S

- Grzegorz Sandomierski – Levadiakos – 2022–2023
- Marek Saganowski – Atromitos – 2010–2011
- Ebi Smolarek – Kavala – 2009–2010
- Jan Sobociński – PAS Giannina – 2024–2025
- Łukasz Sosin – Kavala – 2010
- Michał Stasiak – Skoda Xanthi – 2011–2012
- Karol Świderski – PAOK, Panathinaikos – 2019–2022, 2025–2026
- Igor Sypniewski – Kavala, Panathinaikos, OFI, Kallithea – 1997–2001, 2002–2003
- Grzegorz Szamotulski – PAOK – 2000
- Robert Szczot – Iraklis – 2010–2011
- Mirosław Sznaucner – Iraklis, PAOK, Veria – 2003–2013
- Wojciech Szymanek – Egaleo – 2006–2007
- Damian Szymański – AEK Athens – 2020–2025

T

- Marek Trejgis – Panionios – 2001

U

V

W

- Józef Wandzik – Panathinaikos, Apollon Athens, Athinaikos – 1990–2001
- Krzysztof Warzycha – Panathinaikos – 1989–2004
- Jakub Wawrzyniak – Panathinaikos – 2009
- Tomasz Wieszczycki – OFI – 2001
- Mateusz Wieteska – PAOK – 2025
- Tomasz Wisio – Skoda Xanthi, Ergotelis – 2006–2007, 2009–2012
- Norbert Witkowski – Iraklis – 2011
- Kamil Wojtkowski – Volos – 2021
- Piotr Włodarczyk – Aris – 2008–2009

X

Y

Z

- Michał Żewłakow – Olympiacos – 2006–2010
- Marek Zieńczuk – Skoda Xanthi – 2009–2010
- Maciej Żurawski – AEL – 2008–2009

=== Portugal ===
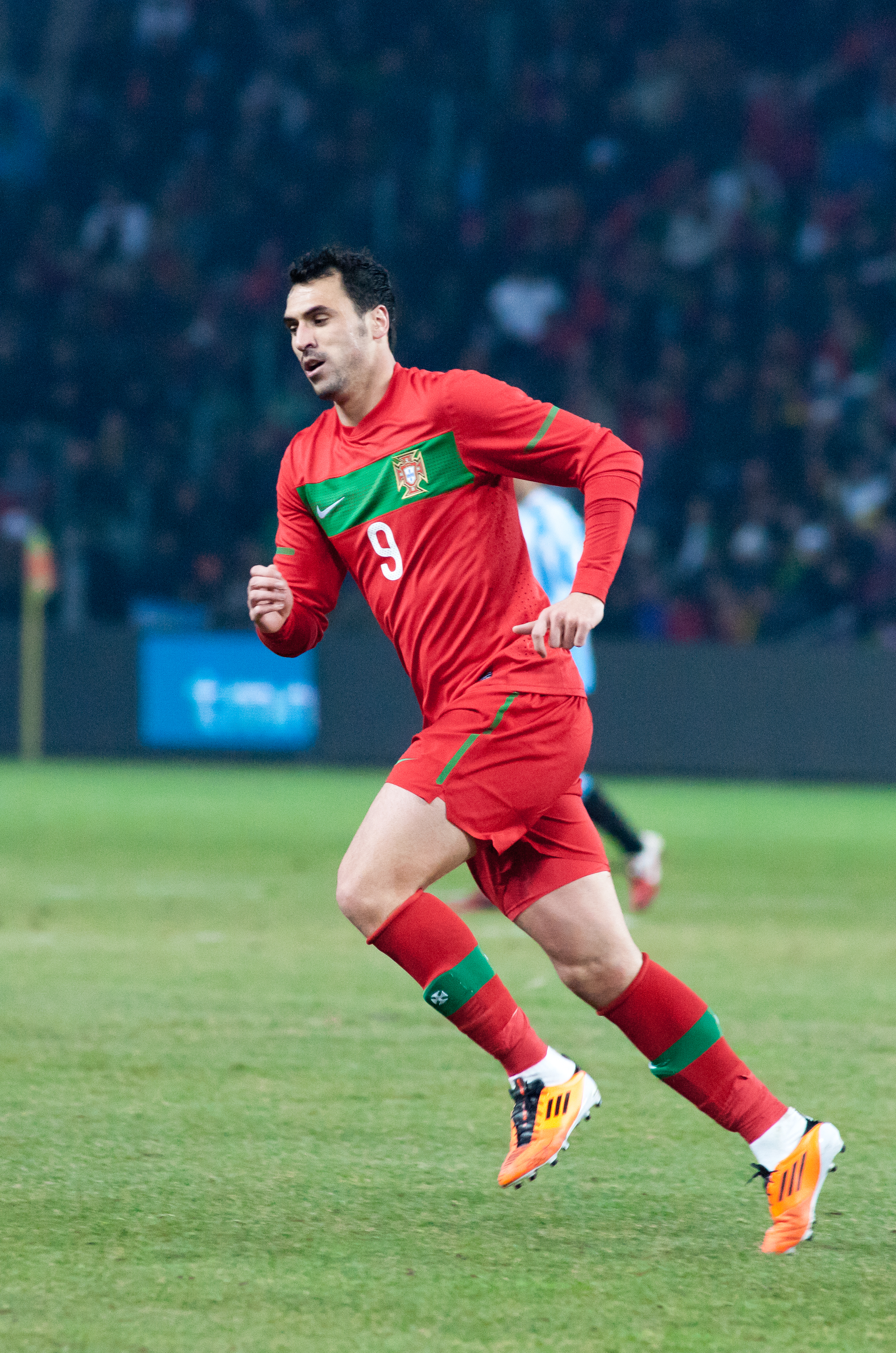
Hugo Almeida

A

- Dinis Almeida – Xanthi – 2018–2019
- Hugo Almeida – AEK Athens – 2016–2017
- Geraldo Alves – AEK Athens – 2007–2010
- Bruno Alves – AEK Athens, Apollon Smyrnis – 2004–2005, 2021–2022
- Pedro Álvaro – Aris – 2025–2026
- Pedro Amaral – Panetolikos, Lamia – 2019, 2023–2024
- Vitorino Antunes – Panionios – 2012

B

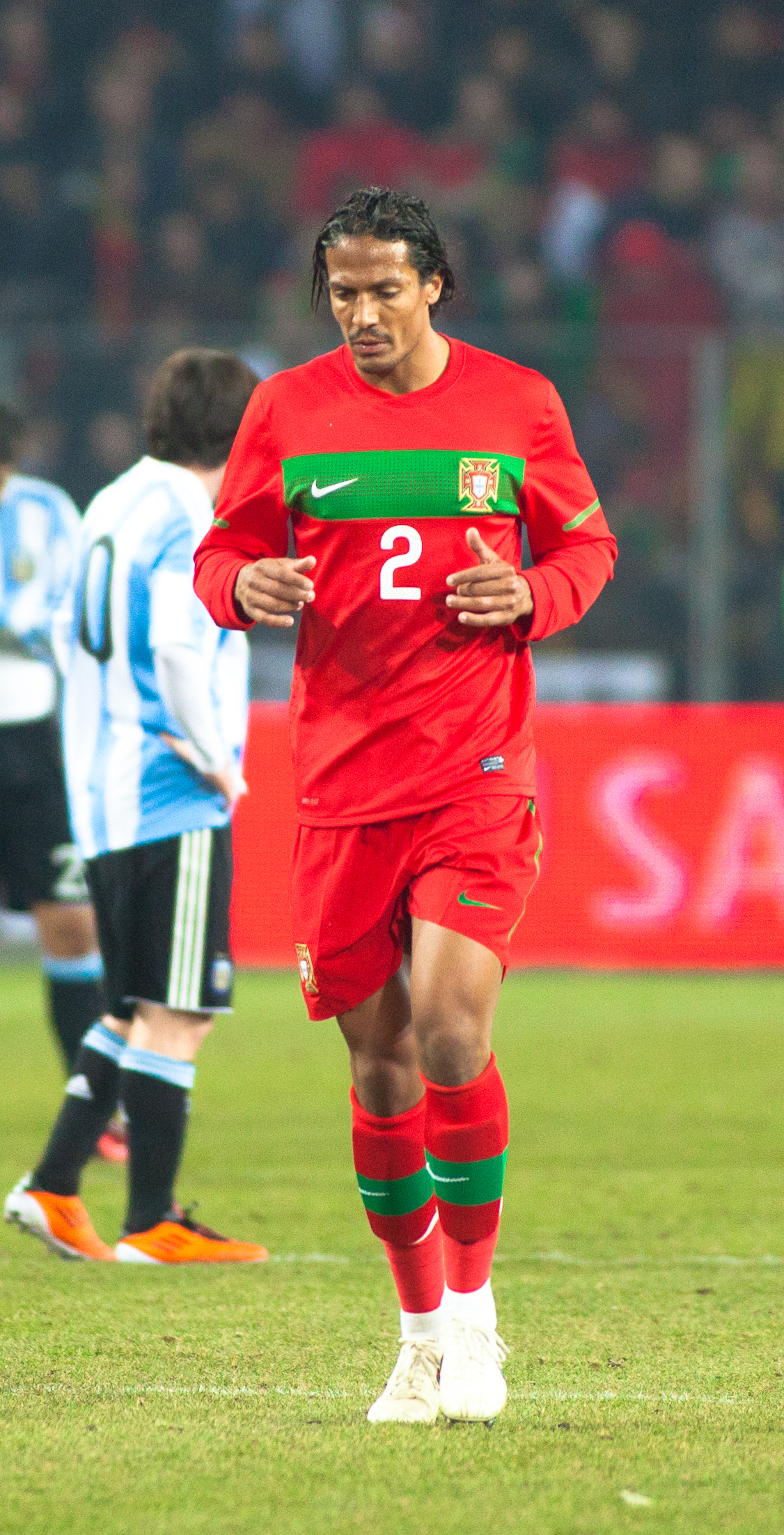
Bruno Alves

- Rui Baião – Kerkyra – 2005
- Hélder Barbosa – AEK Athens, Panetolikos – 2015–2016, 2021–2022
- Bruma – Olympiacos, Aris – 2020–2021, 2026–

C

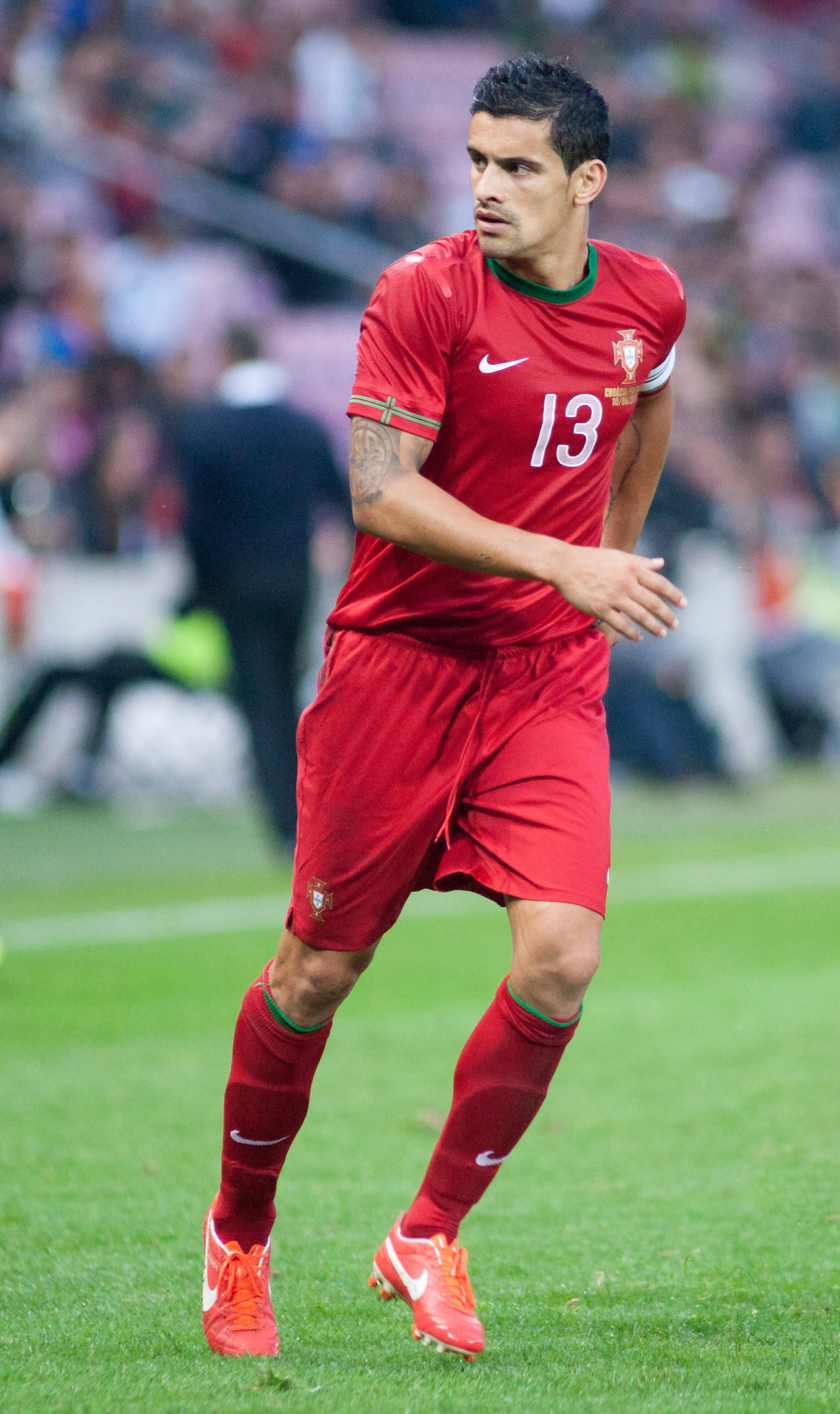
Ricardo Costa

- Cafú – Olympiacos – 2020
- Rafael Camacho – Aris – 2022–2023
- Carlos Carneiro – Panionios – 2006–2007
- João Carvalho – Olympiacos – 2022–2024
- Carlos Chaínho – Panathinaikos – 2002–2003
- Chiquinho – Olympiacos – 2024–
- Nuno Coelho – Aris – 2012–2013
- Sérgio Conceição – PAOK – 2008–2010
- Paulo Costa – Aris, Levadiakos – 2006–2007, 2009–2010
- Ricardo Costa – PAOK – 2015–2016
- Costinha – Olympiacos – 2024–2026
- Cris – Asteras Tripolis – 2010–2011
- Cristiano – Panetolikos – 2016–2017
- Hélder Cristóvão – AEL – 2005–2006

D

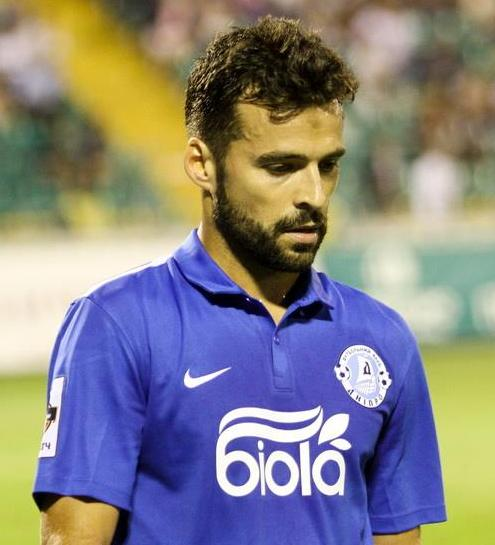
Bruno Gama

- Filipe da Costa – Ionikos, AEL, Veria – 2005–2007, 2013–2014
- Dani – Iraklis, Skoda Xanthi – 2010–2013
- Tiago Dantas – PAOK – 2022–2023
- Francisco Delgado – Skoda Xanthi – 2006–2008
- Gil Dias – Olympiacos – 2018–2019
- Mesaque Djú – OFI – 2022–2023
- Frederico Duarte – Panetolikos – 2019–2024

E

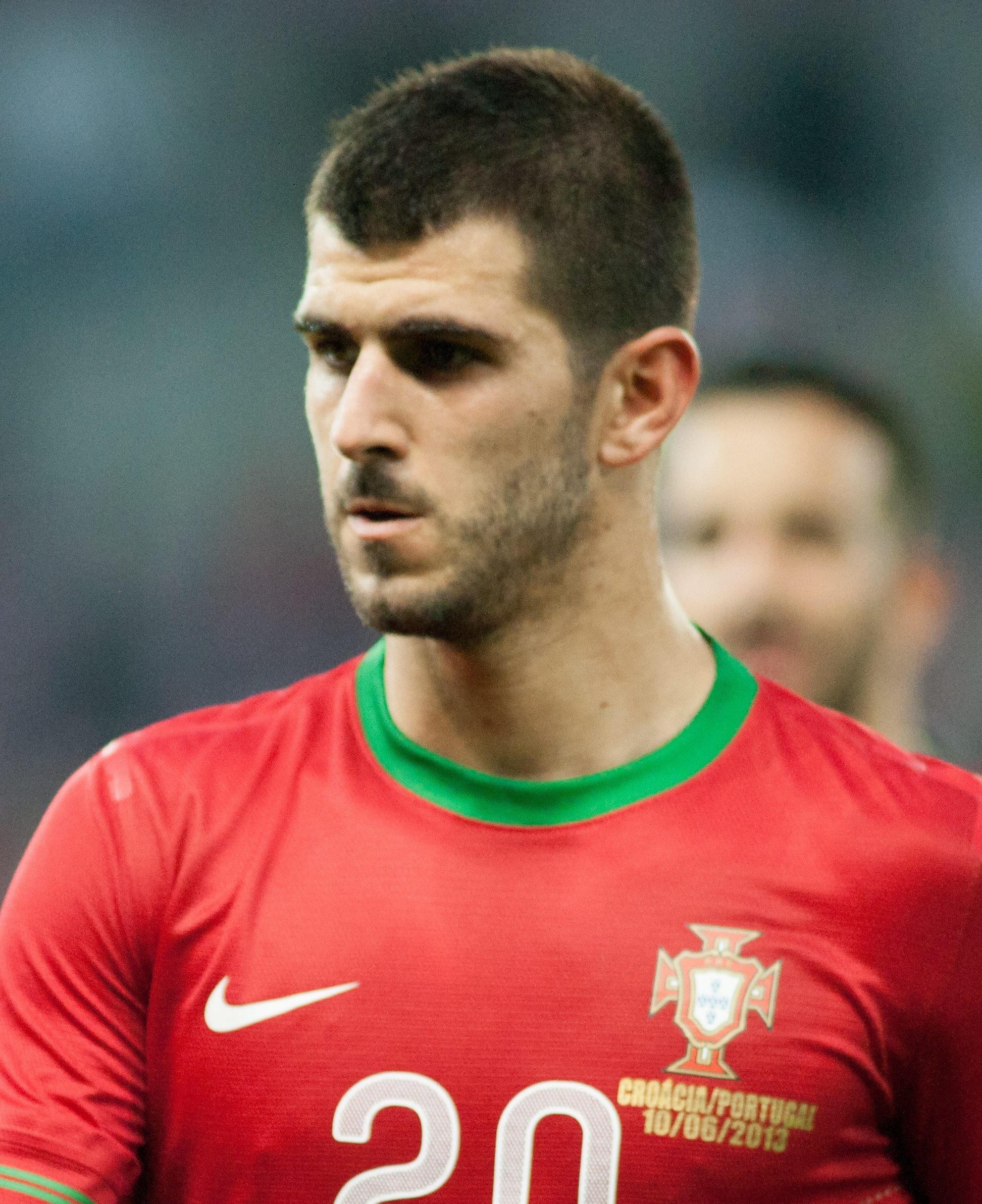
Nélson Oliveira

- Edinho – AEK Athens, PAOK – 2007–2010
- Rodrigo Escoval – Volos – 2022–2023
- Ricardo Esteves – Asteras Tripolis – 2008–2010

F

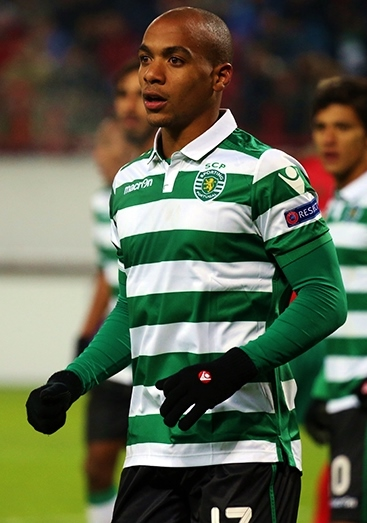
João Mário

- Fabeta – Asteras Tripolis – 2008–2009
- Vasco Faísca – Platanias – 2013–2014
- João Fajardo – Panthrakikos – 2009–2010
- Miguel Falé – Panserraikos – 2025–2026
- Carlos Fangueiro – Ionikos – 2007
- Hugo Faria – AEL Kalloni – 2013–2014
- Fábio Felício – Asteras Tripolis – 2008–2009
- Daniel Fernandes – PAOK, Iraklis, Panathinaikos, Panserraikos, OFI, Panthrakikos – 2004–2008, 2009–2011, 2013–2015
- Manuel Fernandes – Apollon Smyrnis – 2022
- Ricardo Fernandes – Panetolikos – 2012
- Vasco Fernandes – Platanias – 2013–2014
- Yago Fernández – AEK Athens – 2012–2013
- Diogo Figueiras – Olympiacos – 2016–2018
- António Folha – AEK Athens – 2001–2002

G

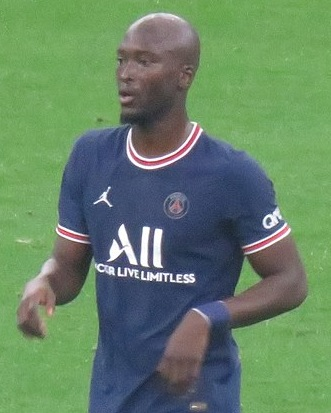
Danilo Pereira

- Bruno Gama – Aris – 2018–2022
- Francisco Geraldes – AEK Athens – 2019–2020
- Guga – Panetolikos – 2019

H

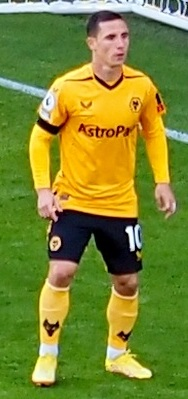
Daniel Podence

- Hernâni – Olympiacos – 2015–2016
- André Horta – Olympiacos – 2024, 2025

I

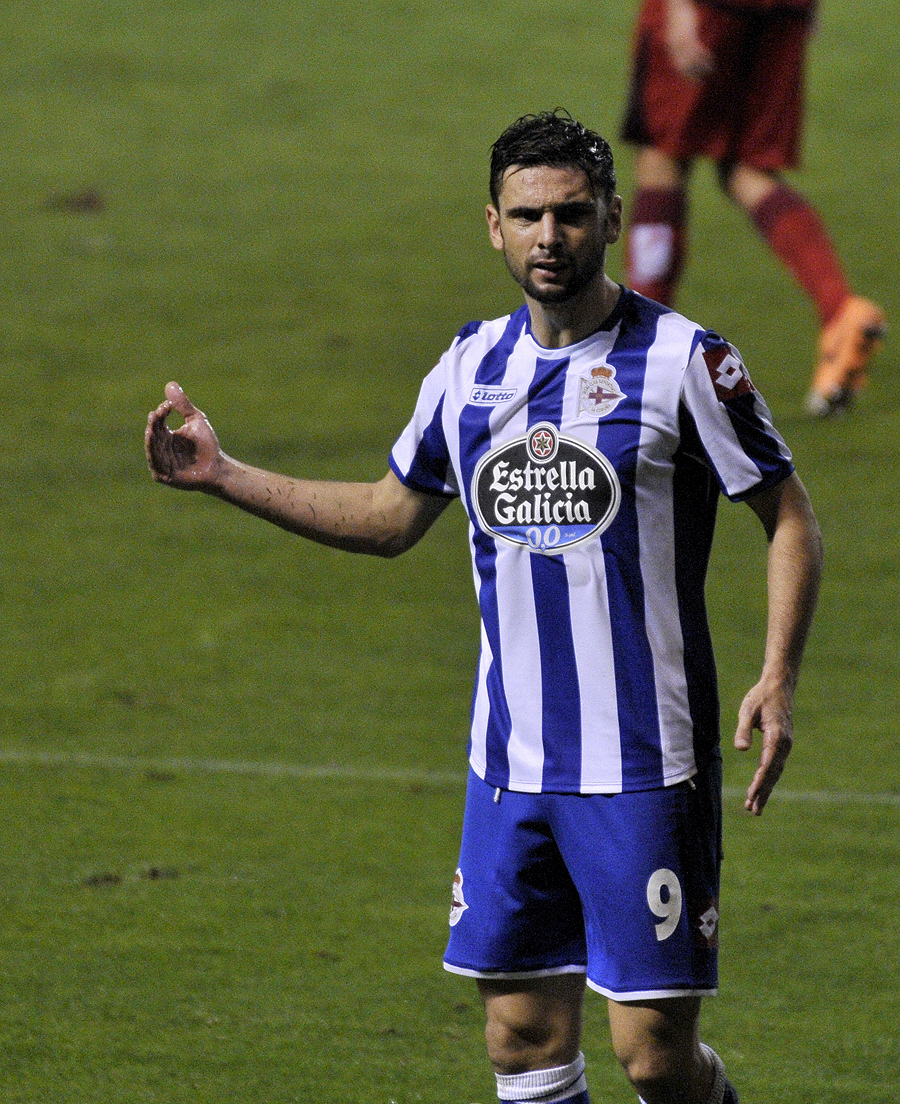
Hélder Postiga

- Igor – Panthrakikos – 2013–2016

J

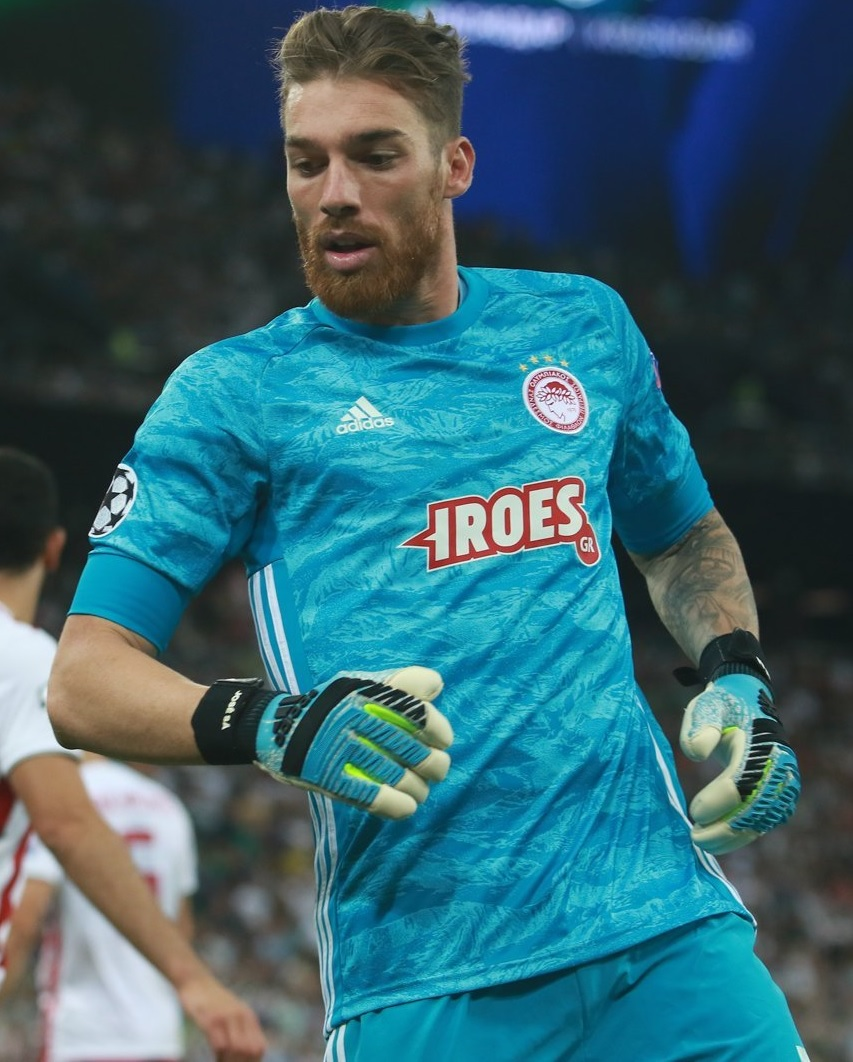
José Sá

- Joca – Volos – 2025–
- Jorginho – Asteras Tripolis – 2008

K

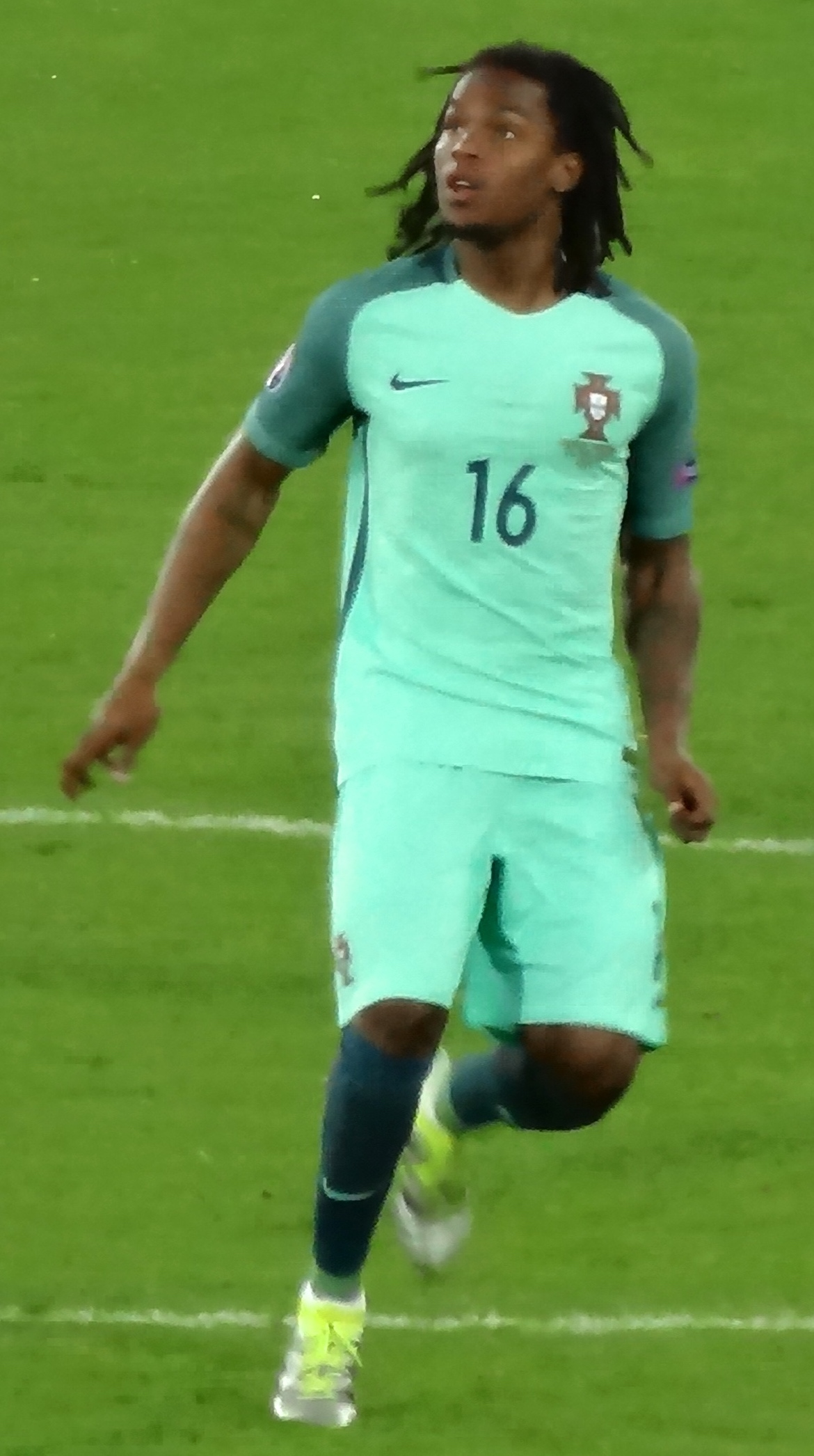
Renato Sanches

- Daniel Kenedy – Ergotelis – 2006–2009

L

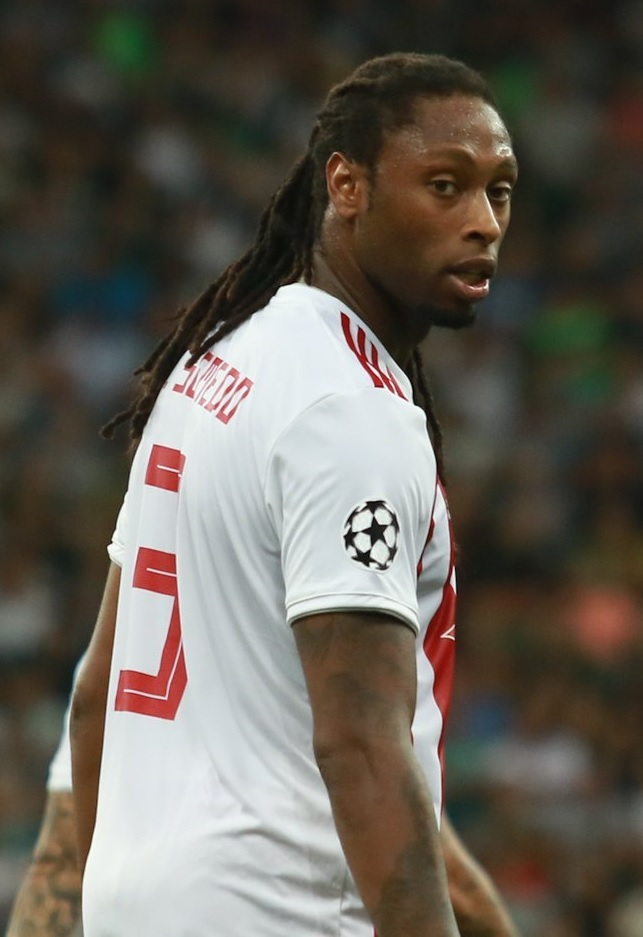
Rúben Semedo

- Vítor Lima – Doxa Drama – 2011–2012
- Hélder Lopes – AEK Athens – 2017–2021
- Rony Lopes – Olympiacos – 2021–2022
- Miguel Luís – Panetolikos – 2024–2026

M

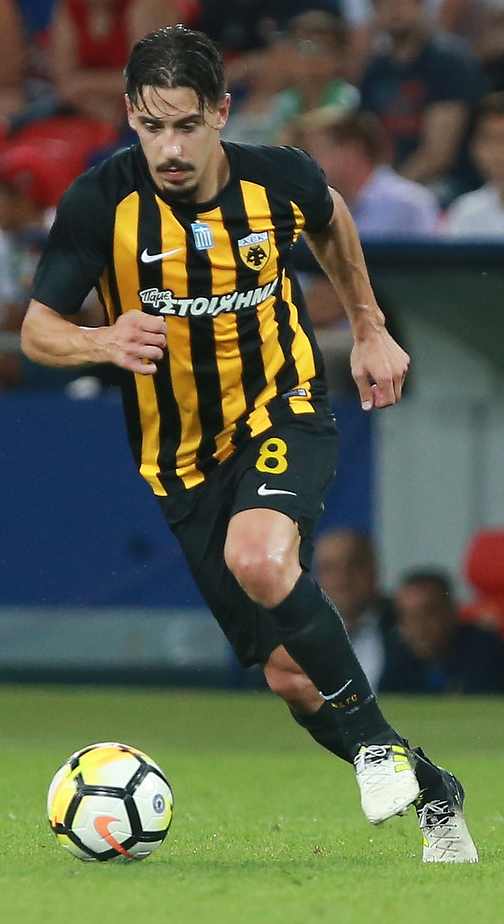
André Simões

- Paulo Machado – Olympiacos – 2012–2014
- Ariza Makukula – OFI – 2013–2014
- Mano – Levadiakos – 2012
- Manú – AEK Athens – 2007–2008
- João Mário – AEK Athens – 2025–2026
- André Marques – Iraklis – 2010
- André Martins – Olympiacos – 2016–2018
- Bernardo Martins – A.E. Kifisia – 2026–
- Gelson Martins – Olympiacos – 2024–
- Pedro Marques – Iraklis – 2026–
- Carlos Milhazes – OFI, Levadiakos – 2013–2017
- Roderick Miranda – Olympiacos – 2018–2019
- Jorge Filipe Monteiro – Iraklis – 2016–2017
- André Moreira – Volos – 2026
- Thierry Moutinho – Levadiakos, Athens Kallithea, AEL – 2021–2023, 2024, 2025–2026

N

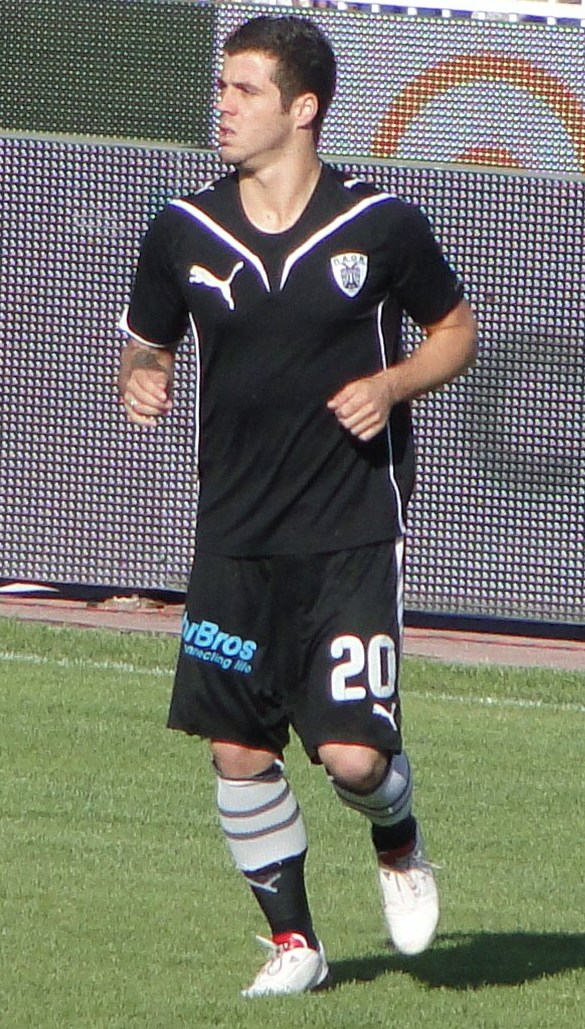
Vieirinha

- Diogo Nascimento – Olympiacos – 2025–
- Fábio Nunes – Kerkyra – 2019–2020
- João Nunes – Panathinaikos – 2019–2020

O

- Nélson Oliveira – AEK Athens, PAOK – 2019–2023
- Sérgio Oliveira – PAOK, Olympiacos – 2019, 2024–2025

P

- Gonçalo Paciência – Olympiacos – 2016–2017
- Paulinho – AEK Athens – 2019–2021
- João Pedro – Apollon Smyrnis – 2018–2019
- João Pedro – Panetolikos – 2022–2024
- João Peixe – Ionikos – 2001–2002
- Pelé – Ergotelis, Olympiacos, Levadiakos – 2013–2015
- Pêpê – Olympiacos – 2020–2024
- Danilo Pereira – Aris – 2010–2011
- Bruno Pereirinha – Kavala – 2011
- André Pinto – Panathinaikos – 2012–2013
- Daniel Podence – Olympiacos – 2018–2020, 2023–2024, 2025–
- Hélder Postiga – Panathinaikos – 2007–2008

Q

R

- Emídio Rafael – Platanias – 2013–2014
- Nuno Reis – Panathinaikos – 2016–2017
- Filipe Relvas – AEK Athens – 2025–
- André Ricardo – PAOK – 2022–
- Luís Rocha – Panetolikos – 2016–2019
- Dani Rodrigues – Ionikos – 2003–2004
- Miguel Rodrigues – Panetolikos – 2016–2018

S

- Gustavo Sá – Olympiacos – 2026–
- José Sá – Olympiacos – 2019–2021
- Renato Sanches – Panathinaikos – 2025–2026
- Renato Santos – Volos – 2021
- Vítor São Bento – Xanthi – 2019–2021
- Rúben Semedo – Olympiacos – 2019–2022
- Sérginho – Levadiakos – 2009–2010
- Jota Silva – Olympiacos – 2026–
- Tiago Silva – Olympiacos – 2020–2021
- Xande Silva – Aris, Iraklis – 2020–2021, 2026–
- David Simão – AEK Athens – 2019–2021
- André Simões – AEK Athens – 2015–2022
- Alex Soares – Volos – 2021–2022
- Filipe Soares – PAOK – 2022–2025
- Rafa Soares – PAOK – 2022–2024
- Gerson Sousa – A.E. Kifisia – 2025–
- Hugo Sousa – Aris, Ionikos, A.E. Kifisia – 2018–2020, 2022–2023, 2025–
- Paulo Sousa – Panathinaikos – 2000–2001
- Fábio Sturgeon – Xanthi, OFI – 2019–2021

T

- Talocha – Atromitos – 2019–2020
- Fábio Tavares – Atromitos, OFI – 2013–2015
- Miguel Tavares – Panathinaikos, A.E. Kifisia – 2022–2026
- André Teixeira – A.E. Kifisia – 2024
- Tomané – Panetolikos – 2016

U

V

- Ricardo Valente – Ionikos – 2022
- Ricardo Vaz – Xanthi, OFI – 2019–2021
- Ricardo Vaz Tê – Panionios – 2010
- Ricardo Velho – Aris – 2026–
- Rúben Vezo – Olympiacos – 2024–2026
- Vieirinha – PAOK – 2008–2012, 2017–2025
- Rúben Vinagre – Olympiacos – 2020–2021
- Miguel Vítor – PAOK – 2013–2016

W

X

- António Xavier – Panathinaikos, Levadiakos – 2020–2023

Y

Z

- Zé Vítor – Veria – 2012
- Zequinha – Panthrakikos – 2013–2014

=== Republic of Ireland ===
- Paul Bannon – PAOK, AEL – 1987–1989
- Ian Daly – Aris – 2009–2010
- Dominic Foley – Ethnikos Piraeus – 1998–1999
- Liam Lawrence – PAOK – 2012–2014
- Anthony Stokes – Apollon Smyrnis – 2018–2019

=== Romania ===
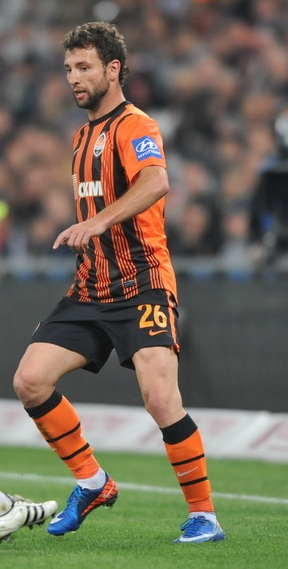
Răzvan Raț

A

- Denis Alibec – Atromitos – 2022
- Marian Aliuță – Iraklis – 2006–2007

B

- Valentin Badea – Panserraikos – 2008–2009
- Claudiu Bălan – PAS Giannina – 2022–2024
- Cosmin Bărcăuan – PAOK, OFI – 2006–2010
- Laurențiu Brănescu – Atromitos – 2023
- Mugurel Buga – Skoda Xanthi – 2010–2011

C

- Florin Călugărița – Proodeftiki – 1997–1998
- Stelian Carabaș – Skoda Xanthi – 2004–2006
- Gheorghe Ceaușilă – PAOK – 1993–1994
- Aurelian Chițu – PAS Giannina – 2013–2014
- Sorin Colceag – Panionios – 2004–2005
- Marcel Coraș – Panionios – 1990–1991
- Cornel Cornea – OFI – 2008–2009
- Silvian Cristescu – Panelefsiniakos – 1998–1999
- Marius Ciugarin – Makedonikos – 1982–1983

D

- Emil Dică – Skoda Xanthi – 2011–2012
- Nicolae Dică – Iraklis – 2009–2010
- Anton Doboș – AEK Athens – 1996–1998

E

F

- Steliano Filip – AEL – 2020–2021
- Răzvan Fritea – Veria – 2007–2008

G

- Cristian Ganea – Aris, Panathinaikos – 2020–2023
- Dorin Goian – Asteras Tripolis – 2013–2016

H

- Ovidiu Herea – Skoda Xanthi – 2015–2016

I

- Victoraș Iacob – Iraklis, Aris – 2009–2012
- Sabin Ilie – Iraklis – 2006–2007
- Adrian Iordache – Levadiakos – 2004–2005
- Ilie Iordache – AEK Athens – 2009–2010
- Anghel Iordănescu – OFI – 1982–1984
- Edward Iordănescu – Panionios – 1998–1999
- Andrei Ivan – Panserraikos – 2025–2026
- Marian Ivan – Aris, Panionios – 1990–1991, 1995–1996

J

K

- Christos Kaltsas – Olympiacos – 1978–1981

L

- Costin Lazăr – PAOK, Panetolikos, Iraklis – 2011–2016
- Erik Lincar – Panathinaikos, Akratitos – 2002–2004
- Florin Lovin – Kerkyra – 2011–2012
- Dănuț Lupu – Panathinaikos, Korinthos, OFI – 1990–1994

M

- Mihail Majearu – Panachaiki – 1990–1991
- Bogdan Mara – Iraklis, Skoda Xanthi – 2010–2012
- Răzvan Marin – AEK Athens – 2025–
- Lucian Marinescu – Akratitos – 2005–2006
- Alexandru Mățan – Panetolikos – 2025–2026
- Cosmin Matei – Atromitos – 2015–2016
- Florentin Matei – Apollon Smyrnis – 2021–2022
- Dumitru Mitu – Panathinaikos – 2004–2005
- Marius Mitu – Skoda Xanthi, Panthrakikos – 2008, 2009–2010
- Nelu Mitrică – Proodeftiki – 1997–1998
- Alexandru Mitriță – PAOK – 2021–2022
- Sebastian Mladen – Panetolikos – 2022–2026
- Olimpiu Moruțan – Aris – 2025–

N

- Vlad Morar – Panetolikos – 2017–2019
- Eugen Neagoe – Veria – 1997–1998
- Ionuț Nedelcearu – AEK Athens – 2020–2021
- Doru Nicolae – Panathinaikos – 1980–1982
- Marius Niculae – Kavala – 2010–2011

O

- Daniel Orac – Panthrakikos – 2009–2010

P

- Ionel Pârvu – PAOK – 1996–1997
- Lucian Pârvu – Ergotelis – 2003–2006
- Constantin Pană – Panachaiki – 1990–1992
- Adrian Petre – Levadiakos – 2022–2023
- Călin Popescu – Volos – 2024
- Octavian Popescu – Levadiakos – 2026–
- Marius Predatu – Panionios – 1995–1996
- Florin Prunea – Skoda Xanthi – 2004–2005

Q

R

- Andrei Radu – PAS Giannina – 2023
- Răzvan Raț – PAOK – 2014–2015
- Dorin Rotariu – Atromitos – 2022–2023

S

- Lucian Sânmărtean – Panathinaikos – 2003–2007
- Florin Stângă – Skoda Xanthi – 2009–2010
- Bogdan Stelea – Akratitos – 2005–2006
- Ștefan Stoica – AEL, Veria – 1991–1999
- Dennis Șerban – AEL – 2005–2006
- Marius Șuleap – OFI – 2008–2009

T

- Alin Toșca – PAOK – 2018–2019
- Gabriel Torje – AEL – 2020–2021

U

V

W

X

Y

Z

=== Russia ===
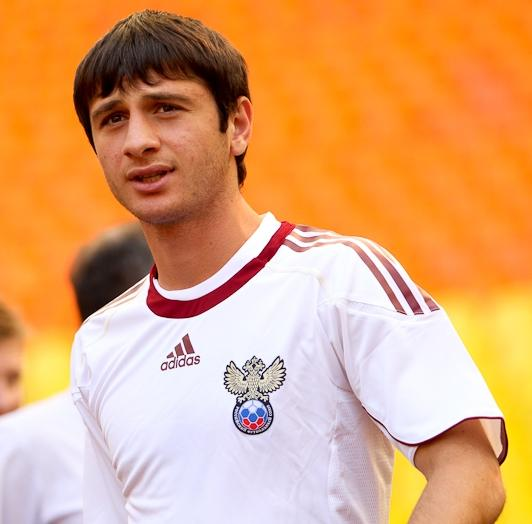
Alan Dzagoev

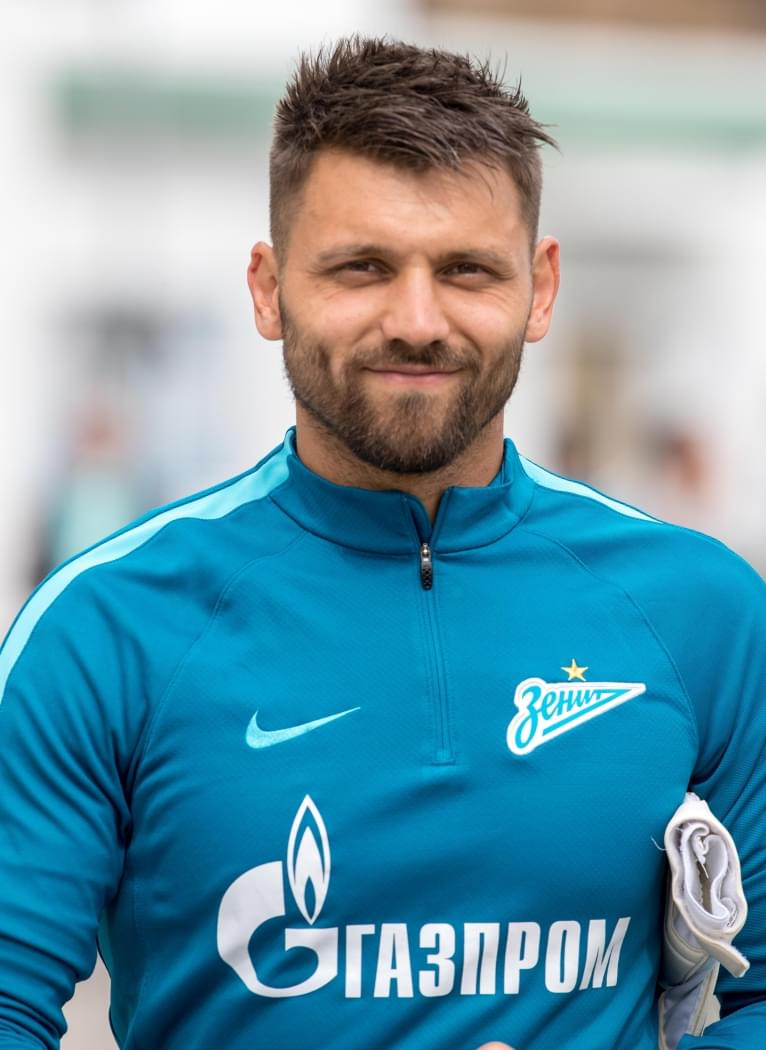
Yuri Lodygin

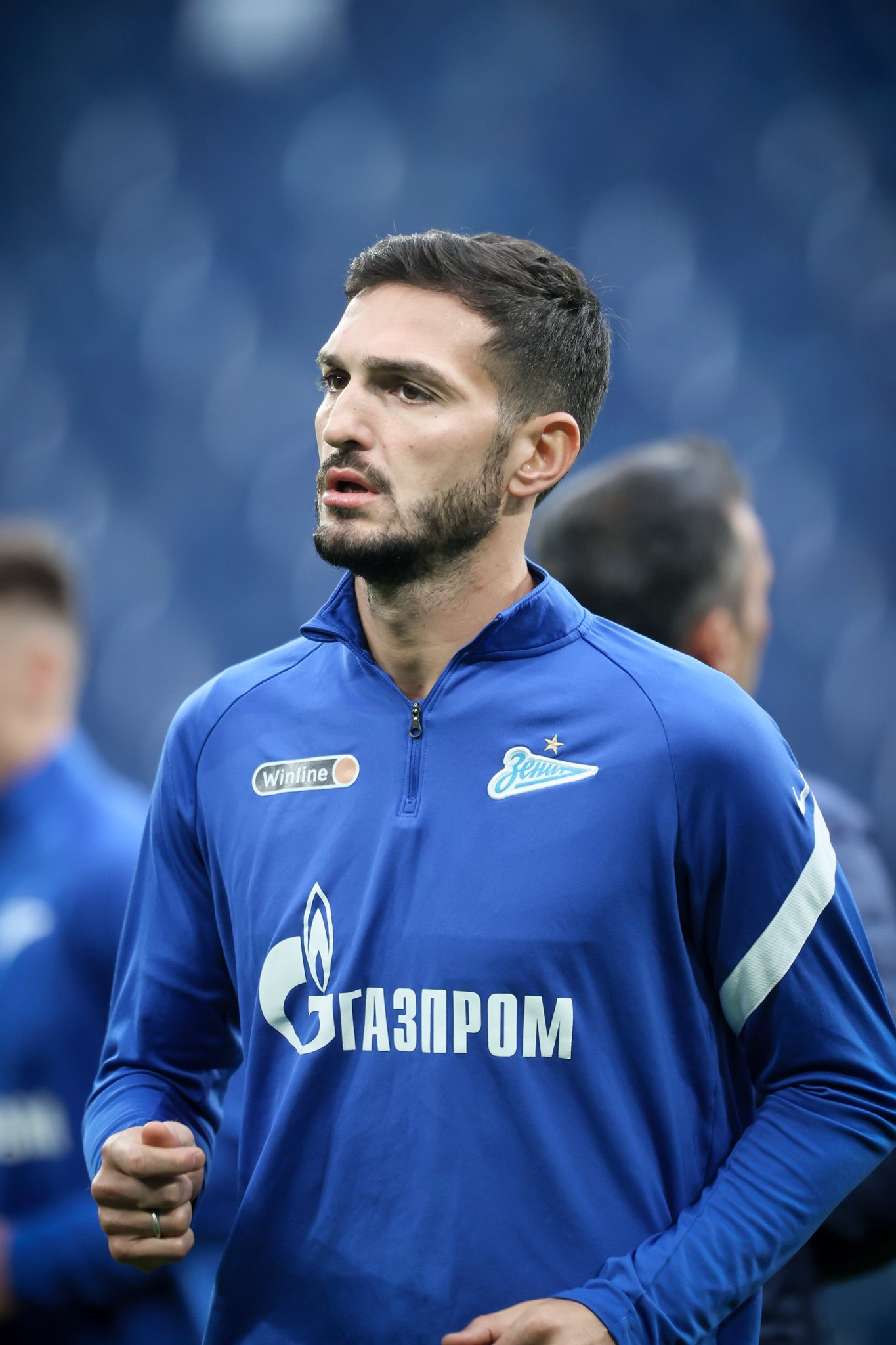
Magomed Ozdoyev

- Fedor Chalov – PAOK – 2024–
- Andrey Chernyshov – PAOK – 1996
- Alan Dzagoev – Lamia – 2023
- Pavel Komolov – Veria – 2014
- Yuri Lodygin – Skoda Xanthi, Olympiacos, PAS Giannina, Panathinaikos, Levadiakos, Volos – 2011–2013, 2021–2026
- Magomed Ozdoyev – PAOK – 2023–2026
- Vitali Papadopulo – Panionios – 1993–1994
- Yuri Savichev – Olympiacos – 1990–1992
- Zurab Sanaya – Paniliakos – 1995–1997
- Magomed-Shapi Suleymanov – Aris – 2023–2025
- Omari Tetradze – PAOK – 1999–2001
- Oleg Veretennikov – Aris – 2000
- Aleksei Yeryomenko – Athinaikos – 1994–1995

=== Scotland ===
- Craig Brewster – Ionikos – 1996–2001
- Lee Bullen – Kalamata – 1998–2000
- Islam Feruz – OFI – 2014
- Jordan Holsgrove – Olympiacos – 2023–2024
- Mark Kerr – Asteras Tripolis – 2010–2011
- James Penrice – AEK Athens – 2025–
- Trevor Ross – AEK Athens – 1983
- Greg Taylor – PAOK – 2025–
- Steven Tweed – Ionikos – 1996–1997

=== Serbia ===
A

- Goran Acimović – Panionios – 1993
- Branimir Aleksić – AEL Kalloni – 2014–2015
- Goran Aleksić – PAOK – 1996
- Kosta Aleksić – Panserraikos, Panetolikos – 2023–2024, 2025–
- Miroslav Aleksić – Doxa Drama – 1990–1995
- Enver Alivodić – Apollon Smyrnis – 2018
- Dragan Antić – Ionikos – 1994–1995
- Filip Arsenijević – Panthrakikos – 2009–2010
- Nemanja Arsenijević – Asteras Tripolis – 2011–2012
- Nikola Ašćerić – Lamia – 2018

B

- Siniša Babić – AEL – 2017
- Zoran Babović – Kastoria, Pierikos – 1980–1985
- Filip Bainović – OFI – 2024–2026
- Vladimir Bajić – Levadiakos, AEL – 2018–2021
- Rajko Banjac – Apollon Athens – 1998
- Božidar Bandović – Olympiacos, PAOK – 1997–2000
- Nikola Beljić – Panserraikos, Atromitos, Platanias, Skoda Xanthi – 2010–2014, 2015
- Kristijan Belić – Olympiacos – 2019–2021
- Nenad Bjeković – AEK Athens – 1999–2000
- Nenad Bikić – Egaleo – 2002–2003
- Marko Blažić – AEL Kalloni, Lamia – 2016, 2017–2019
- Milan Bojović – Panetolikos – 2013–2014
- Milan Bosanać – Paniliakos – 2001
- Dragomir Bozović – Apollon Kalamarias – 1989–1990
- Vidak Bratić – PAOK – 2000–2001
- Željko Brkić – PAOK – 2016–2018
- Nikola Budišić – Panathinaikos – 1974–1975

C

- Srđan Cerović – Panachaiki – 1995–1997
- Dragan Ćirić – AEK Athens – 1999–2000
- Zoran Ćirić – Apollon Athens – 2000
- Srđan Čolaković – Edessaikos – 1994–1996
- Uroš Ćosić – AEK Athens, AEL – 2017–2019, 2021
- Lazar Ranđelović – Olympiacos – 2018–2024

D

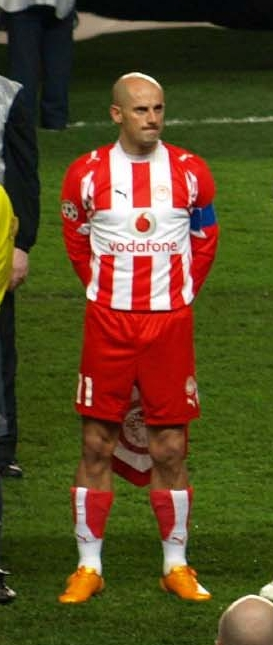
Predrag Đorđević

- Miloš Dabić – Athinaikos – 1994–1996
- Jovica Damjanović – Apollon Athens, Kallithea – 1996–1998, 2003–2004
- Miloš Deletić – AEL, AEK Athens, Asteras Tripolis, Lamia, Volos, Panserraikos – 2016–2025
- Đorđe Denić – Atromitos – 2021–2022
- Vladimir Đilas – Ergotelis – 2015
- Željko Đokić – Panthrakikos – 2009–2010
- Enes Dolovac – PAS Giannina – 2016–2019
- Predrag Đorđević – Paniliakos, Olympiacos – 1995–2009
- Goran Đurović – Panachaiki – 1995–1996
- Radislav Dragićević – Kallithea – 2002–2005
- Goran Drulić – OFI – 2006–2008
- Dragan Đukanović – OFI – 1992–1995
- Dejan Đurđević – Apollon Athens – 1994
- Milan Đurđević – PAOK, PAS Giannina – 1991–1993, 1997–1998
- Uroš Đurđević – Olympiacos – 2017–2018
- Filip Đuričić – Panathinaikos – 2023–2026
- Petar Đuričković – Xanthi – 2018–2020

E

F

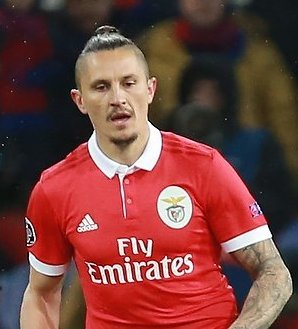
Ljubomir Fejsa

- Ljubomir Fejsa – Olympiacos – 2011–2013
- Danko Filipović – Apollon Athens – 1998–1999
- Miloš Filipović – AEL – 2019–2020

G

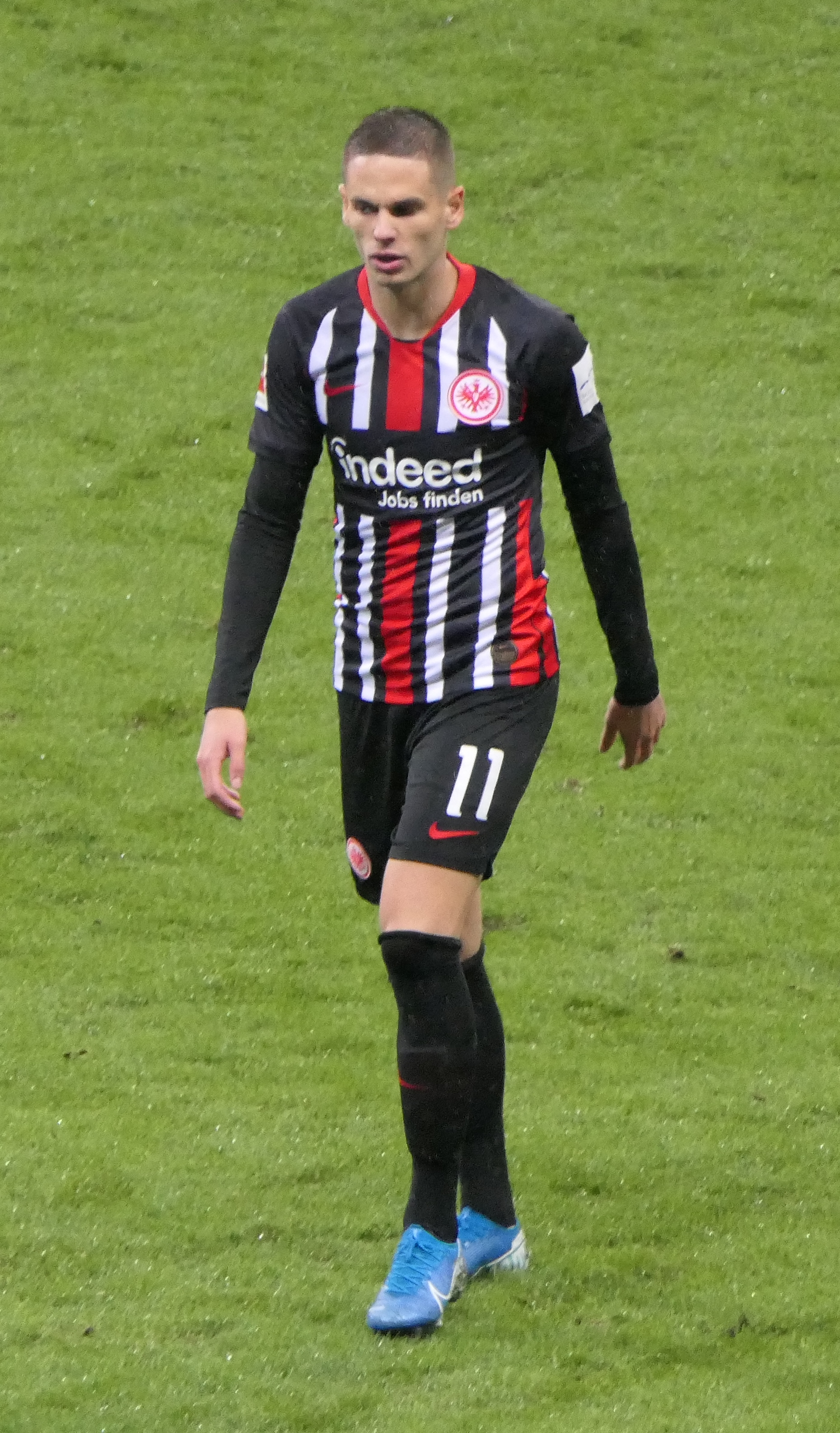
Mijat Gaćinović

- Mijat Gaćinović – Panathinaikos, AEK Athens – 2022–
- Danijel Gašić – AEL Kalloni – 2013–2014
- Goran Gavrančić – PAOK – 2008
- Petar Gigić – Panserraikos – 2024–2025
- Nemanja Glavčić – Volos – 2023–2025
- Marko Gobeljić – A.E. Kifisia – 2023–2024
- Aleksandar Gojković – AEL – 2018–2020
- Jovan Gojković – Iraklis – 2000–2001
- Vladimir Golemić – Lamia – 2021–2022
- Marko Grujić – AEK Athens – 2025–2026
- Petar Gusić – Apollon Athens – 1998
- Ivan Gvozdenović – Kavala – 2010

H

I

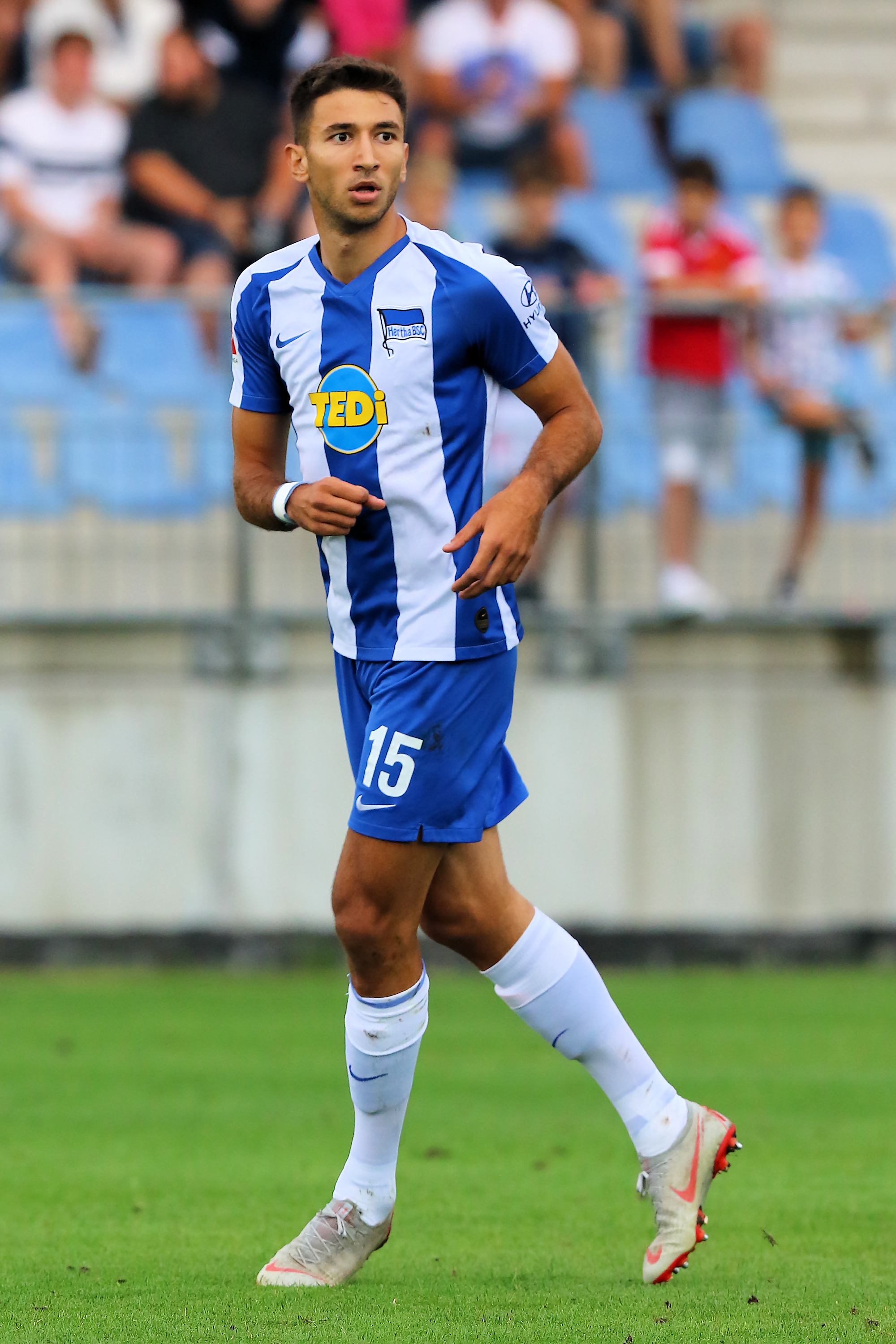
Marko Grujić

- Uros Ignjatović – Kalamata – 2026–
- Aleksandar Ilić – Paniliakos – 1995–1997
- Brana Ilić – PAS Giannina – 2012–2016
- Radiša Ilić – Panserraikos – 2009
- Saša Ilić – AEL – 2009
- Ivica Iliev – PAOK – 2007–2008
- Vladan Isailović – Apollon Kalamarias – 1992–1994
- Željko Ivanović – Ionikos – 1992–1993
- Ilija Ivić – Olympiacos, Aris, AEK Athens – 1994–1999, 2001–2004
- Vladimir Ivić – AEK Athens, Aris, PAOK – 2005–2012

J

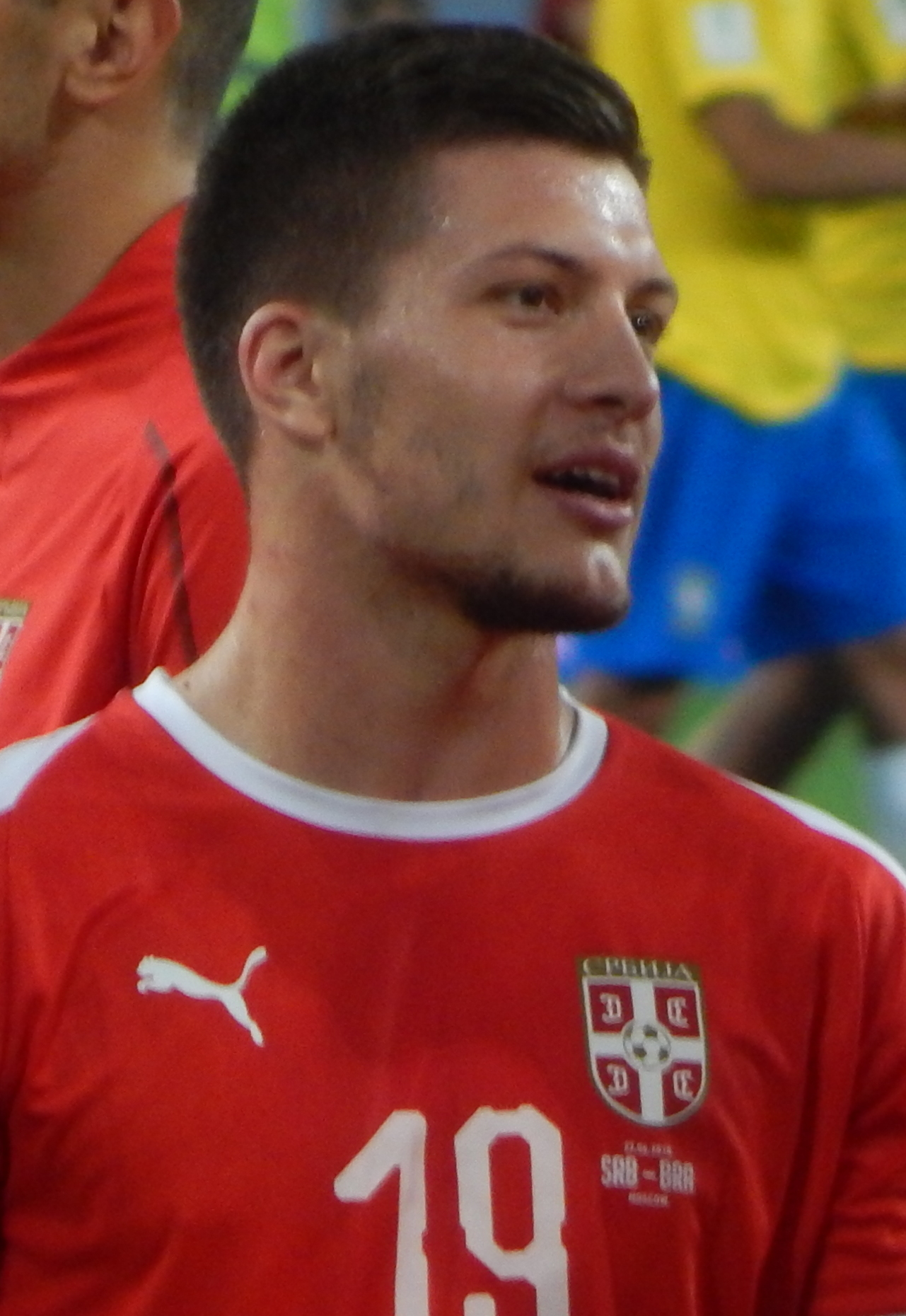
Luka Jović

- Zoran Jevtović – Apollon Athens – 1988–1992
- Dušan Jovančić – A.E. Kifisia – 2024
- Borislav Jovanović – Ergotelis, AEL – 2011–2015, 2016–2017
- Dušan Jovanović – Panachaiki, Panionios – 1999–2001
- Ivan Jovanović – Iraklis – 1989–1999
- Marko Jovanović – AEL – 2017–2018
- Saša Jovanović – Trikala, Panionios – 1999–2002
- Vladimir Jovanović – Ethnikos Asteras – 1998–1999
- Luka Jović – AEK Athens – 2025–
- Miroslav Jović – PAOK – 1996
- Zoran Jovičić – Ethnikos Piraeus – 1994–1995
- Saša Jonović – Naoussa – 1994
- Ivan Jurišić – PAOK, Apollon Kalamarias – 1984–1987, 1989–1990

K

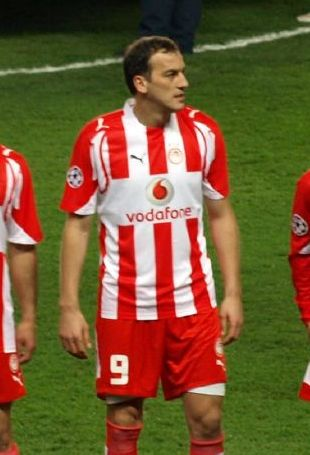
Darko Kovačević

- Damir Kahriman – Lamia – 2019–2020
- Željko Kalajdžić – Kavala, OFI, Platanias – 2009–2010, 2011–2015
- Aleksandar Katai – Olympiacos, OFI, Platanias – 2011–2014
- Marko Kerkez – Aris – 2025, 2026
- Filip Kljajić – Platanias – 2018
- Miloje Kljajević – Ionikos, Panionios – 1994–2001, 2002–2003
- Jovan Krneta – Levadiakos – 2018–2019
- Lazar Kojić – Panetolikos – 2025–
- Vladimir Kojić – Levadiakos – 1993–1995
- Branislav Kojičić – Doxa Drama – 1992–1993
- Dragan Kokotović – PAS Giannina – 1981–1984
- Ivan Kostić – Volos, Lamia – 2023–2025
- Aleksandar Kovačević – Xanthi – 2018–2019
- Bojan Kovačević – AEL – 2025–2026
- Darko Kovačević – Olympiacos – 2007–2009
- Milenko Kovačević – Apollon Athens – 1992–1995
- Slobodan Krčmarević – PAOK, Panionios – 1999–2000
- Nenad Krstičić – AEK Athens – 2019–2021
- Radovan Krstović – Doxa Drama – 1994–1995
- Nebojša Krupniković – Panionios – 1993–1994

L

- Đorđe Lazić – Skoda Xanthi – 2016–2017
- Nikola Leković – Kerkyra – 2018
- Zoran Lončar – Aris – 1992–1996
- Milan Lukač – AEK Athens – 2009–2011
- Nedeljko Lukač – Diagoras – 1986–1987
- Vladan Lukić – Paniliakos – 1999–2000

M

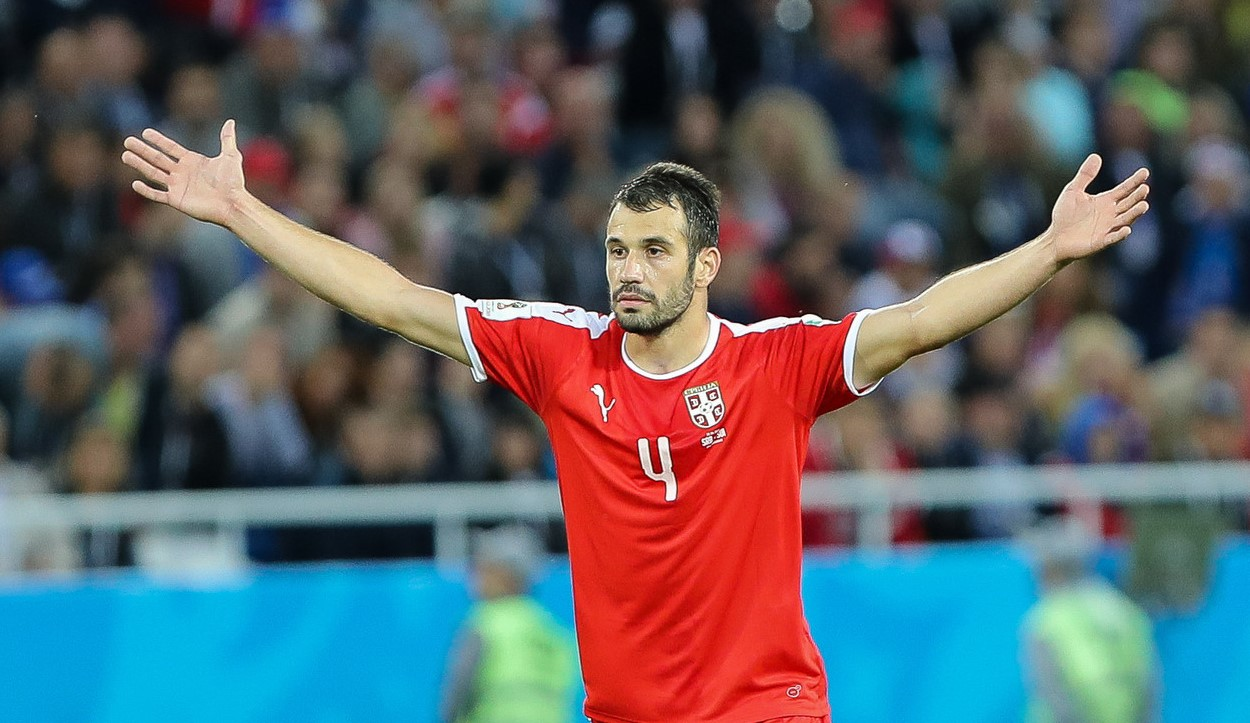
Luka Milivojević

- Andrija Majdevac – Panetolikos – 2024–2025
- Milan Majstorović – Apollon Athens – 1984–1987
- Nemanja Maksimović – Panathinaikos – 2024–2025
- Novica Maksimović – Panionios – 2019–2020
- Nebojša Maksimović – Paniliakos – 1995–1996
- Nikola Malbaša – AEK Athens – 2005–2006
- Filip Manojlović – Panionios – 2018–2019
- Miloš Marić – Olympiacos – 2004–2007
- Nebojša Marinković – Iraklis – 2007–2008
- Ivan Marković – Levadiakos – 2015
- Miroslav Marković – AEL Kalloni – 2015–2016
- Svetozar Marković – Olympiacos, AEL – 2019–2022
- Neven Marković – Kerkyra, Doxa Drama – 2010, 2011–2012
- Marko Markovski – Skoda Xanthi, Kerkyra, Panetolikos, Levadiakos – 2011–2013, 2014–2019
- Zoran Mašić – Panionios – 1994–1995
- Bojan Matić – Atromitos – 2020–2021
- Miodrag Medan – Paniliakos, Panionios – 1995–1998
- Dejan Meleg – Levadiakos – 2019
- Vladimir Matijašević – AEK Athens, Apollon Kalamarias – 1999–2000, 2005–2006
- Boško Mihajlović – Panachaiki – 1997–1998
- Mirko Mihić – Kavala – 1994–1995
- Aleksandar Mijatović – Kallithea – 2006
- Nemanja Miletić – Volos – 2024–2025
- Nikola Mikić – AEL Kalloni – 2016
- Slobodan Miletić – AEL – 1996–1997
- Kristijan Miljević – Levadiakos, Veria – 2012–2014, 2016–2017
- Nenad Miljković – Paniliakos – 2001
- Ljubiša Milojević – Aris – 1992–1997
- Vladan Milojević – Kalamata, Apollon Athens, Panathinaikos, Iraklis, Akratitos – 1995–2004
- Vladan Milosavljev – Levadiakos – 2014–2015
- Nedeljko Milosavljević – Doxa Drama – 1990–1992
- Radomir Milosavljević – AEL – 2018–2021
- Branko Milovanović – AEK Athens, Ethnikos Asteras – 1999, 2000
- Dejan Milovanović – Panionios – 2010–2011
- Luka Milivojević – Olympiacos – 2014–2017
- Luka Milunović – Platanias – 2014–2016
- Igor Mirčeta – Platanias – 2012–2013
- Nikola Mirković – Atromitos – 2017–2018
- Predrag Mitić – OFI, Athinaikos – 1995–2001
- Zoran Mišić – Panserraikos – 1983–1984
- Dušan Mitošević – Iraklis – 1983–1984
- Stefan Mitrović – Asteras Tripolis – 2026–
- Filip Mladenović – Panathinaikos – 2023–2026
- Nemanja Mladenović – AEL – 2018
- Srdjan Mladenović – Veria – 1998–1999
- Miljan Mrdaković – Veria, Levadiakos – 2013–2014, 2015
- Zdenko Muf – PAS Giannina, Kalamata – 1993–1996, 2002–2003
- Aleksandar Mutavdžić – Panserraikos – 2009

N

- Ivan Nedeljković – Ethnikos Asteras, AEL, Egaleo – 2001, 2005–2006, 2007
- Vladimir Nenadić – Athinaikos – 1996–1997
- Branislav Nikić – Kerkyra – 2016–2017
- Nikola Nikić – Egaleo, Aris, PAOK – 1984–1988
- Radoslav Nikodijević – Doxa Drama – 1990–1992
- Dejan Nikolić – Paniliakos – 1997
- Siniša Nikolić – Levadiakos – 1994–1995
- Srboljub Nikolić – Veria – 1997
- Aleksandar Nosković – Ergotelis – 2014

O

- Milan Obradović – Akratitos – 2005–2006
- Nemanja Obradović – Kerkyra – 2014
- Perica Ognjenović – Ergotelis – 2006–2008
- Branko Ostojić – Veria – 2013–2016
- Ognjen Ožegović – Volos, A.E. Kifisia, Atromitos, Levadiakos – 2022–2024, 2025–

P

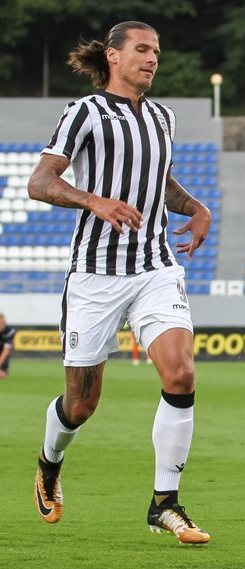
Aleksandar Prijović

- Dušan Pantelić – PAS Giannina – 2019
- Marko Pantelić – Iraklis, Olympiacos – 1995–1997, 2010–2013
- Milinko Pantić – Panionios – 1991–1995
- Miloš Pantović – Panathinaikos – 2025–
- Slobodan Paunovski – Korinthos – 1981–1982
- Milan Pavlović – Iraklis, Ethnikos Asteras – 1995–1996, 1998–2002
- Zoran Pavlović – Olympiacos Volos – 2000
- Milan Pepić – Athinaikos – 1995–1997
- Aleksandar Pešić – OFI – 2008–2009
- Miloje Petković – Veria, Apollon Athens – 1996–1998, 1999–2000
- Goran Petković – Kallithea – 2002–2006
- Goran Petkovski – Ethnikos Piraeus – 1996–1998
- Gordan Petrić – AEK Athens – 1999
- Zoran Petrović – Korinthos – 1992–1993
- Pavle Popara – Apollon Kalamarias – 2006–2007
- Aleksandar Popović – Kavala – 2009–2010
- Ranko Popović – Ethnikos Piraeus – 1994–1995
- Mirko Popovski – Panserraikos – 1981–1982
- Aleksandar Prijović – PAOK – 2017–2019
- Josip Projić – Levadiakos – 2014

Q

R

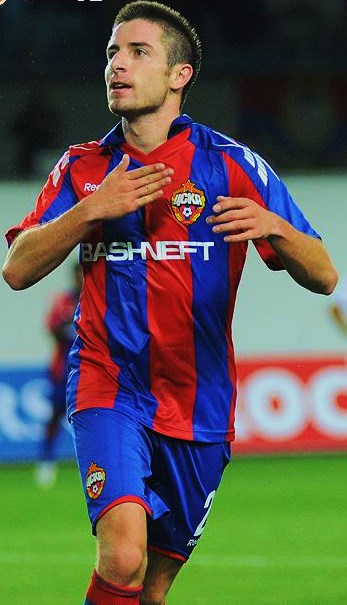
Zoran Tošić

- Uroš Račić – Aris – 2025–
- Saša Radivojević – Apollon Kalamarias – 2005–2006
- Dragan Radišić – PAS Giannina – 1981–1982
- Nemanja Radoja – Iraklis – 2026–
- Branko Radovanović – Kallithea – 2006
- Milorad Rajović – Apollon Athens – 1986–1987
- Bogoljub Randjelović – Pierikos – 1991–1993
- Lazar Ranđelović – Olympiacos – 2018–2021
- Borivoje Ristić – AEL – 2019–2020
- Zoran Riznić – OFI – 1995–1998
- Lazar Romanić – Lamia – 2018–2023
- Lazar Rosić – AEL – 2026

S

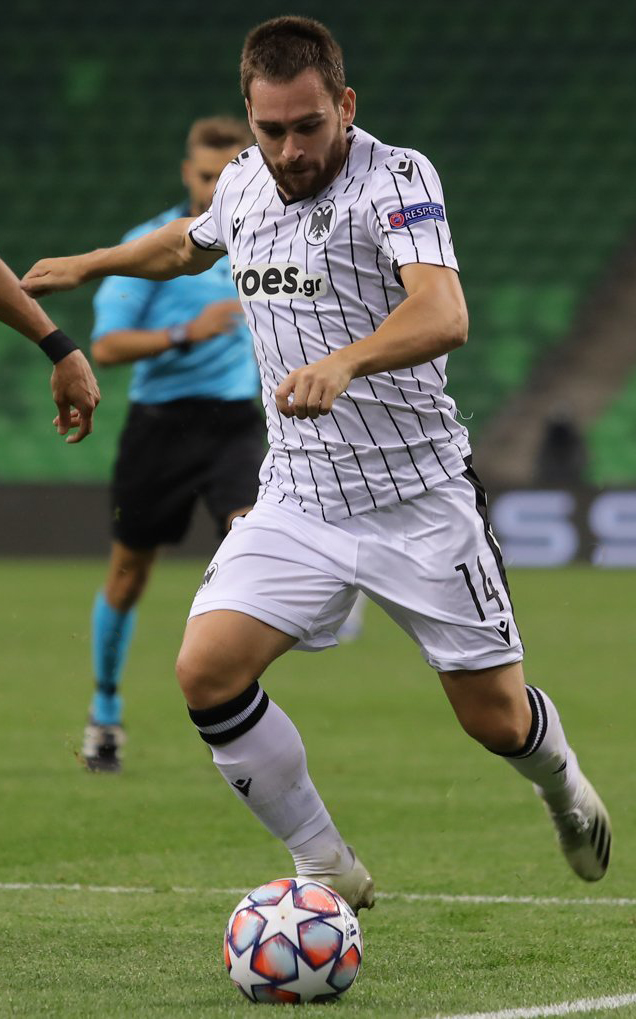
Andrija Živković

- Bojan Šaranov – Ergotelis, Lamia – 2015, 2018–2019, 2021–2023
- Dejan Sarić – Panathinaikos, PAS Giannina, Kallithea – 2002–2004
- Duško Savić – Ionikos – 1992–1993
- Miroslav Savić – Aris – 2000
- Srđan Savičević – Apollon Kalamarias – 1993–1994
- Marko Šćepović – Olympiacos – 2013–2014
- Milan Sevo – Trikala – 2000
- Aleksandar Simić – OFI, AEL – 2007–2011
- Dušan Simić – Panachaiki – 1987–1988
- Nikola Simić – Egaleo – 2005
- Aleksandar Simoncić – Panionios – 2003
- Miroslav Šimonovič – Pierikos – 1985
- Saša Simonović – Aris – 1995–1998
- Željko Simović – Kavala, Ethnikos Piraeus – 1996–1998
- Uroš Sinđić – Panserraikos – 2011
- Dobrica Spasić – Ethnikos Piraeus – 1997–1998
- Slađan Spasić – PAOK, AEL – 2000–2006
- Nikola Stajić – Panetolikos – 2023–
- Bogdan Stamenković – Volos – 2022
- Aleksandar Stanisavljević – Asteras Tripolis – 2016–2017
- Filip Stanisavljević – Platanias – 2015–2018
- Nikola Stanković – AEL – 2019–2020
- Marko Stanojević – Levadiakos – 2018–2019
- Dejan Stefanov – Egaleo – 2002–2003
- Ljubomir Stevanović – AEL Kalloni – 2014–2015
- Goran Stevanović – Veria, Panelefsiniakos – 1997–1999
- Zoran Stoinović – Aris, Trikala, Panachaiki – 1998–1999, 1999–2000, 2002–2003
- Nenad Stojaković – PAOK – 2006–2007
- Nikola Stojanović – Ergotelis – 2014–2015
- Stefan Stojanović – Ethnikos Asteras – 1999–2000
- Stefan Stojanović – Levadiakos – 2020–2023
- Ilija Stolica – OFI – 2009
- Aleksandar Stojanović – Egaleo, Diagoras – 1983–1985
- Miloš Stojčev – Atromitos, Veria, Platanias – 2015–2018
- Vladimir Stojković – Ergotelis – 2014
- Stanko Svitlica – Ethnikos Asteras – 1999–2000

T

- Božidar Tadić – Panserraikos – 2008–2009, 2010–2011
- Ivan Tasić – Ergotelis – 2006–2008
- Srdjan Tekijaski – Aris – 1990–1991
- Nikola Terzić – Panserraikos – 2024–2025
- Zvezdan Terzić – Kastoria – 1996–1997
- Darko Tešović – Ethnikos Asteras – 1999–2002
- Arsen Tošić – Panserraikos – 1983–1984
- Goran Tošić – Apollon Kalamarias – 1993–1994
- Zoran Tošić – Lamia – 2023–2024
- Nikola Trajković – Thrasyvoulos – 2009
- Nikola Trujić – AEL – 2020–2021

U

- Ognjen Ugrešić – PAOK – 2026–

V

- Vaso Vasić – Apollon Smyrnis – 2018–2019
- Nikola Vasiljević – Kalamata – 2026–
- Vladimir Vermezović – Panionios – 1991–1995
- Dušan Vidojević – PAS Giannina, Kerkyra – 2002–2004
- Ljubomir Vorkapić – Veria – 1998–1999
- Nemanja Vučićević – Kavala – 2010–2011
- Zvonimir Vukić – PAOK, Veria – 2013–2015
- Aleksandar Vuković – Ergotelis, Iraklis – 2004–2005, 2009
- Jagoš Vuković – Olympiacos – 2017–2019
- Dragan Vulević – Panionios – 2000–2001

W

X

Y

Z

- Saša Zdjelar – Olympiacos – 2015–2018
- Saša Zimonjić – Panionios – 2004–2005
- Andrija Živković – PAOK – 2020–
- Miroslav Živković – Naoussa – 1993–1994
- Stefan Živković – AEL – 2019
- Vladan Živković – Ionikos – 1994–1995
- Živko Živković – Xanthi, PAOK, Panetolikos – 2016–2024, 2025–2026

=== Slovakia ===
A

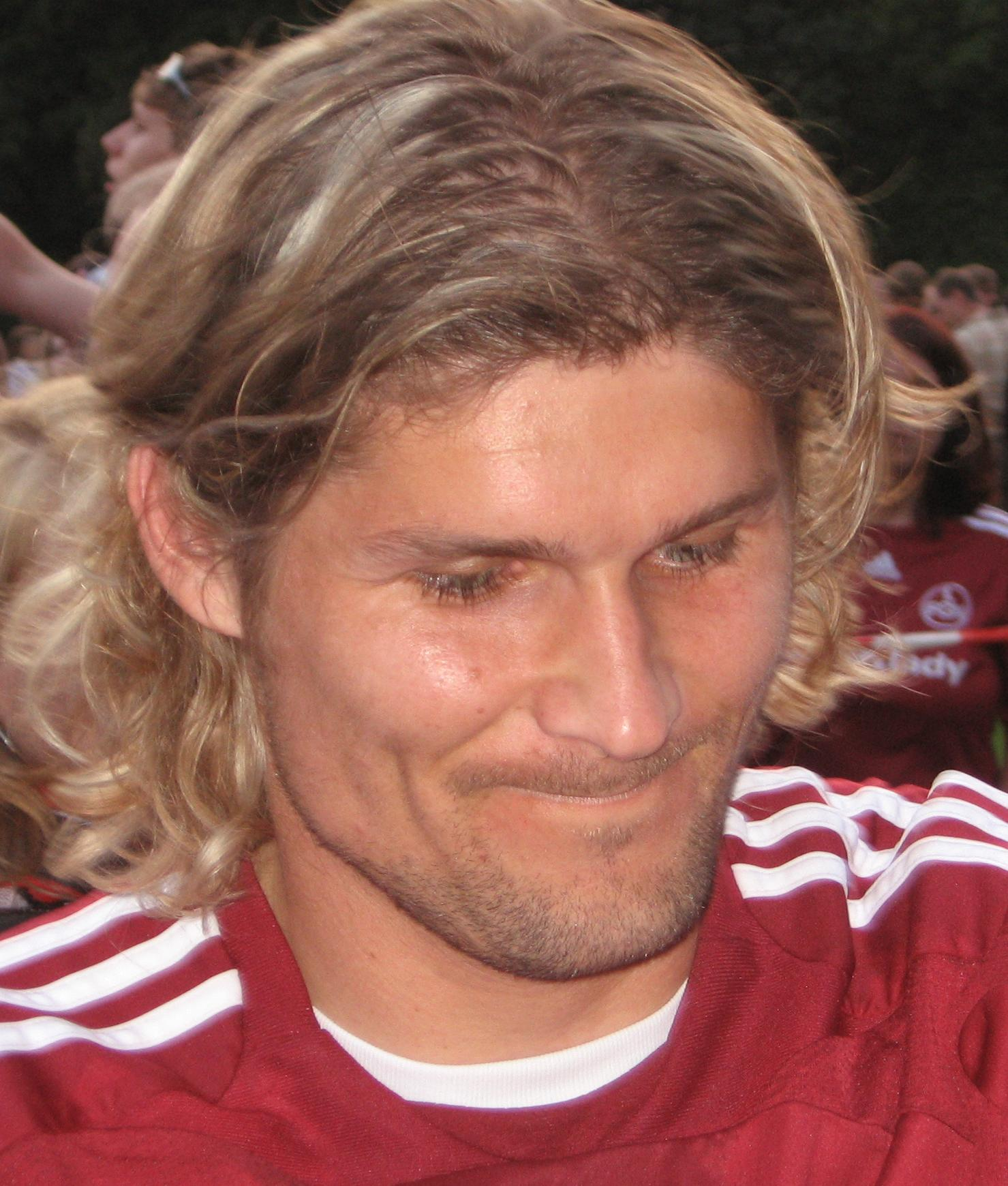
Mário Breška

B

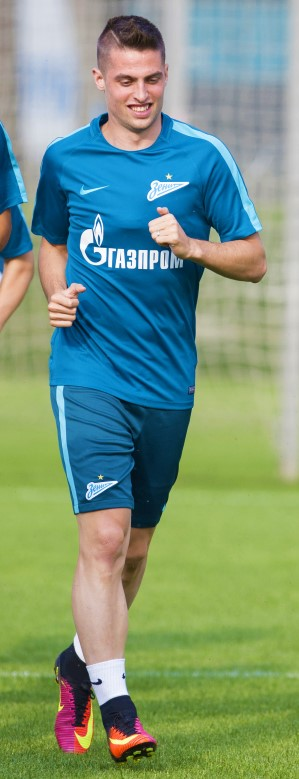
Róbert Mak

- Miroslav Barčík – Ergotelis – 2006
- Matúš Begala – PAS Giannina – 2023–2024
- Tomáš Belic – Panionios – 2009–2010
- Mário Breška – Panionios, Olympiacos Volos, Asteras Tripolis – 2004–2007, 2010–2012
- Juraj Buček – Skoda Xanthi, Olympiacos, Aris – 1997–2006

C

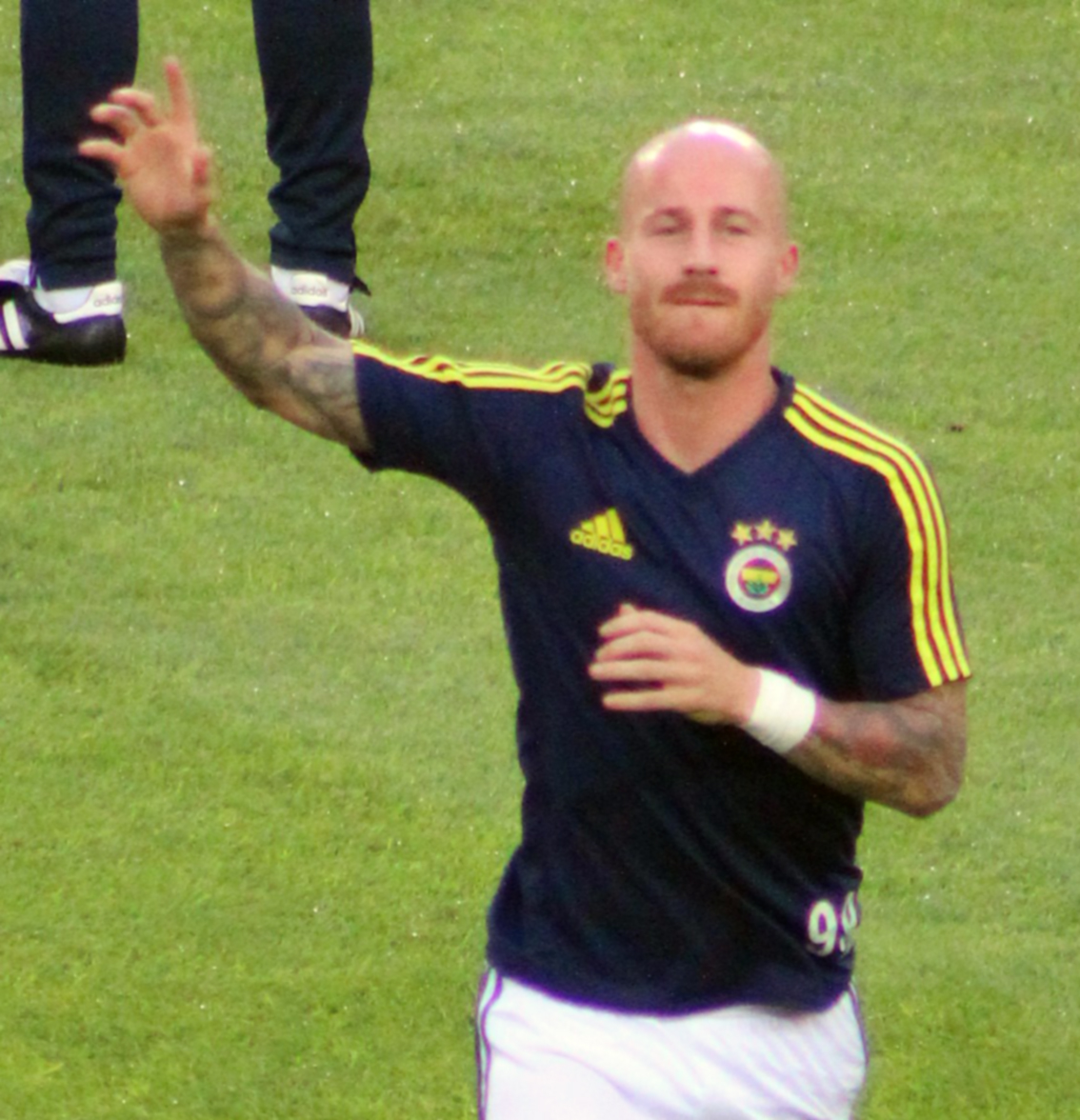
Miroslav Stoch

- Kamil Čontofalský – AEL – 2011
- Adrián Chovan – Panserraikos – 2023–2024
- Juraj Czinege – Iraklis – 2007

D

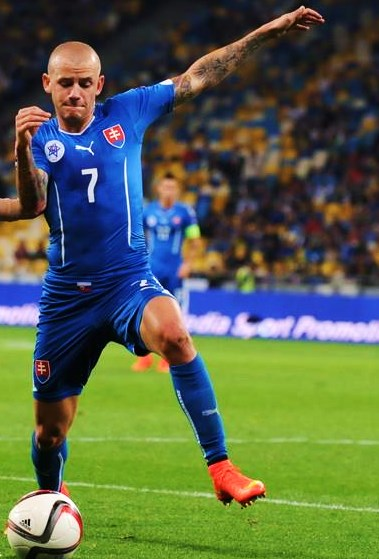
Vladimir Weiss

- Vernon De Marco – Panserraikos – 2025–2026
- Peter Doležaj – Olympiacos Volos, Panetolikos – 2010–2012
- Miroslav Drobňák – Skoda Xanthi – 2003

E

F

- Pavol Farkaš – Skoda Xanthi, AEL – 2015–2018
- Miroslav Filipko – Iraklis – 2007–2008

G

- Jozef Gašpar – Panionios – 2006–2008
- Michal Gottwald – OFI – 1999–2000
- Norbert Gyömbér – Levadiakos – 2026–

H

- Marcel Horký – Panionios – 2002–2003
- Jakub Hromada – Iraklis – 2026–

I

J

- Vladimír Janočko – Skoda Xanthi – 2000–2001
- Erik Jendrišek – Skoda Xanthi, Volos – 2017–2020

K

- Pavel Kováč – Apollon Kalamarias, Olympiacos – 2005–2010
- Marián Kelemen – Aris – 2007–2009
- Igor Klejch – Panachaiki – 1995–1998
- Miroslav König – Panionios – 2006–2008
- Tomáš Košický – Asteras Tripolis – 2014–2017
- Ján Kozák – AEL – 2011–2012
- Jozef Kozlej – AEL, Thrasyvoulos – 2007–2009
- Dominik Kružliak – Volos – 2023
- František Kubík – Ergotelis – 2014

L

- Marián Ľalík – Panionios – 2002–2003
- Rastislav Ján Lazorík – Levadiakos – 2005–2006
- Peter Lérant – Panionios – 2001
- Milan Luhový – PAOK – 1993–1995

M

- Jozef Majoroš – Aris – 2000
- Róbert Mak – PAOK – 2014–2016, 2017–2018
- Ľubomír Meszároš – Panionios – 2004–2005
- Pavol Michalík – Panserraikos – 1986–1991
- Samuel Mráz – Volos – 2023–2024

N

- Ján Novota – Panserraikos – 2010

O

- Tomáš Oravec – Panionios – 2005

P

- Dušan Perniš – Iraklis – 2015–2016
- Michal Peškovič – Aris – 2009–2010
- Attila Pinte – Panionios – 2002–2003
- Karol Praženica – OFI – 1995–1996
- Rostislav Prokop – Athinaikos – 1997–1998

Q

R

S

- Erik Sabo – PAOK – 2015–2016
- Michal Škvarka – Levadiakos – 2022–2023
- Miroslav Stoch – PAOK – 2013–2014, 2019–2020
- Zdeno Štrba – Skoda Xanthi – 2009–2011
- Peter Štyvar – Skoda Xanthi – 2009
- Marián Šuchančok – Akratitos – 2002–2003
- Kamil Susko – PAOK – 2002–2003

T

- Ľubomír Tupta – AEL – 2025–2026

U

- Martin Urban – PAS Giannina – 2001–2003

V

W

- Vladimir Weiss – Olympiacos – 2013–2014

X

Y

Z

- Marián Zeman – PAOK – 2001–2002
- Adam Žulevič – Iraklis – 2026–

=== Slovenia ===
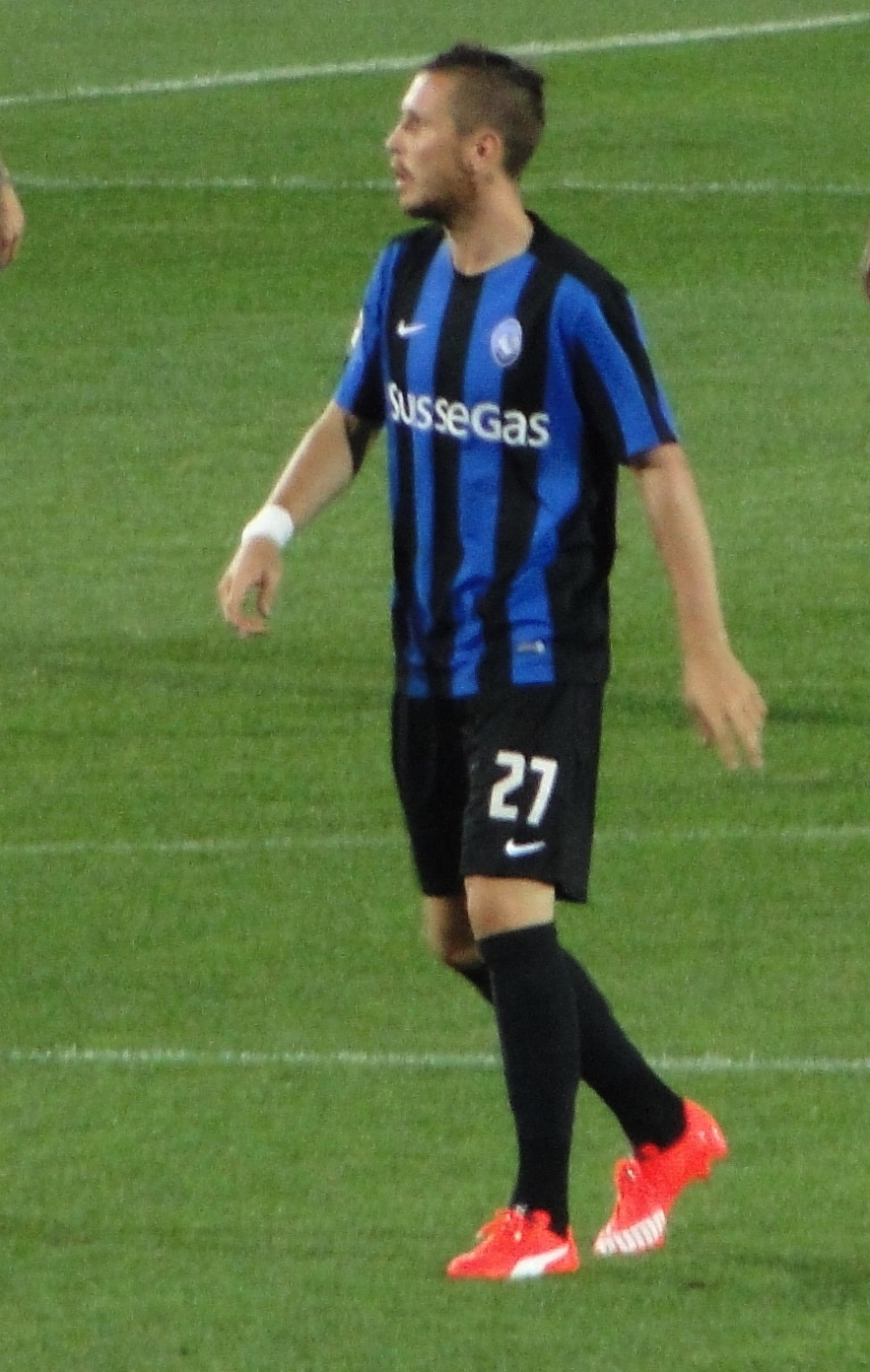
Jasmin Kurtić

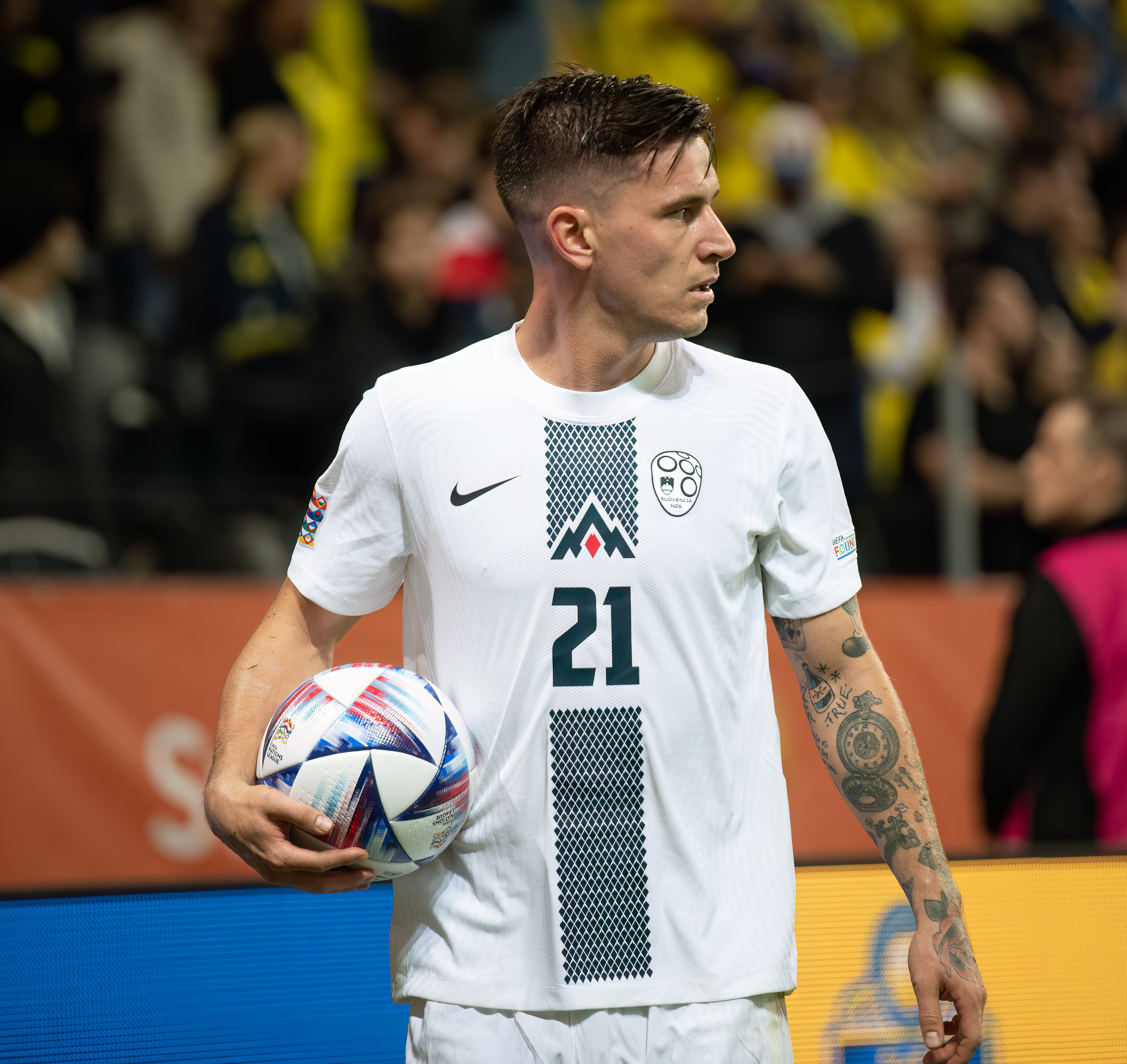
Benjamin Verbič

- Jože Benko – Iraklis – 2007–2008
- Nastja Čeh – Panserraikos – 2008–2009
- Adam Gnezda Čerin – Panathinaikos – 2022–2026
- Rok Elsner – Aris – 2013–2014
- Suad Fileković – Ergotelis – 2005
- Safet Jahič – Panionios – 2005–2006
- Miha Kline – Veria – 2007–2008
- Milan Kocić – Panionios – 2018–2019
- Matic Kotnik – Panionios, Volos – 2017–2020, 2021–2023
- Erik Kržišnik – PAS Giannina, Akratitos – 2002–2003
- Robert Kurež – Ergotelis – 2014
- Jasmin Kurtić – PAOK – 2021–2023
- Žiga Laci – AEK Athens – 2020–2024
- Džoni Novak – Olympiacos – 2003
- Marko Nunić – AEL – 2018–2021
- Alen Ožbolt – Levadiakos – 2024–2026
- Janez Pate – Pierikos – 1991–1993
- Denis Popović – Panthrakikos – 2013−2014
- Aleksandar Radosavljević – AEL – 2010
- Saša Ranić – Veria – 2007–2008
- Goran Sankovič – Akratitos, Panionios – 2002–2004
- Dino Seremet – Kerkyra, AEL, Panthrakikos, Doxa Drama – 2006–2007, 2008–2010, 2011–2012, 2013–2014
- Ermin Šiljak – Panionios – 2002–2003
- Mirnes Šišić – AEL, Levadiakos, Iraklis, Olympiacos, PAS Giannina, OFI – 2005–2008, 2009–2012, 2013–2015
- Grega Sorčan – Apollon Smyrnis – 2022–2023
- Andraž Šporar – Panathinaikos – 2022–2025
- Tadej Steharnik – Akratitos – 2002–2003
- Rok Štraus – Ergotelis – 2014–2015
- Andraž Struna – PAS Giannina – 2013–2016
- Benjamin Verbič – Panathinaikos, Levadiakos – 2022–2026
- Nejc Vidmar – Ionikos – 2022
- Marko Vogrič – Ionikos – 2004–2005
- Zlatko Zahovič – Olympiacos – 1999–2000
- Dražen Žeželj – Panionios – 2006–2007

=== Spain ===
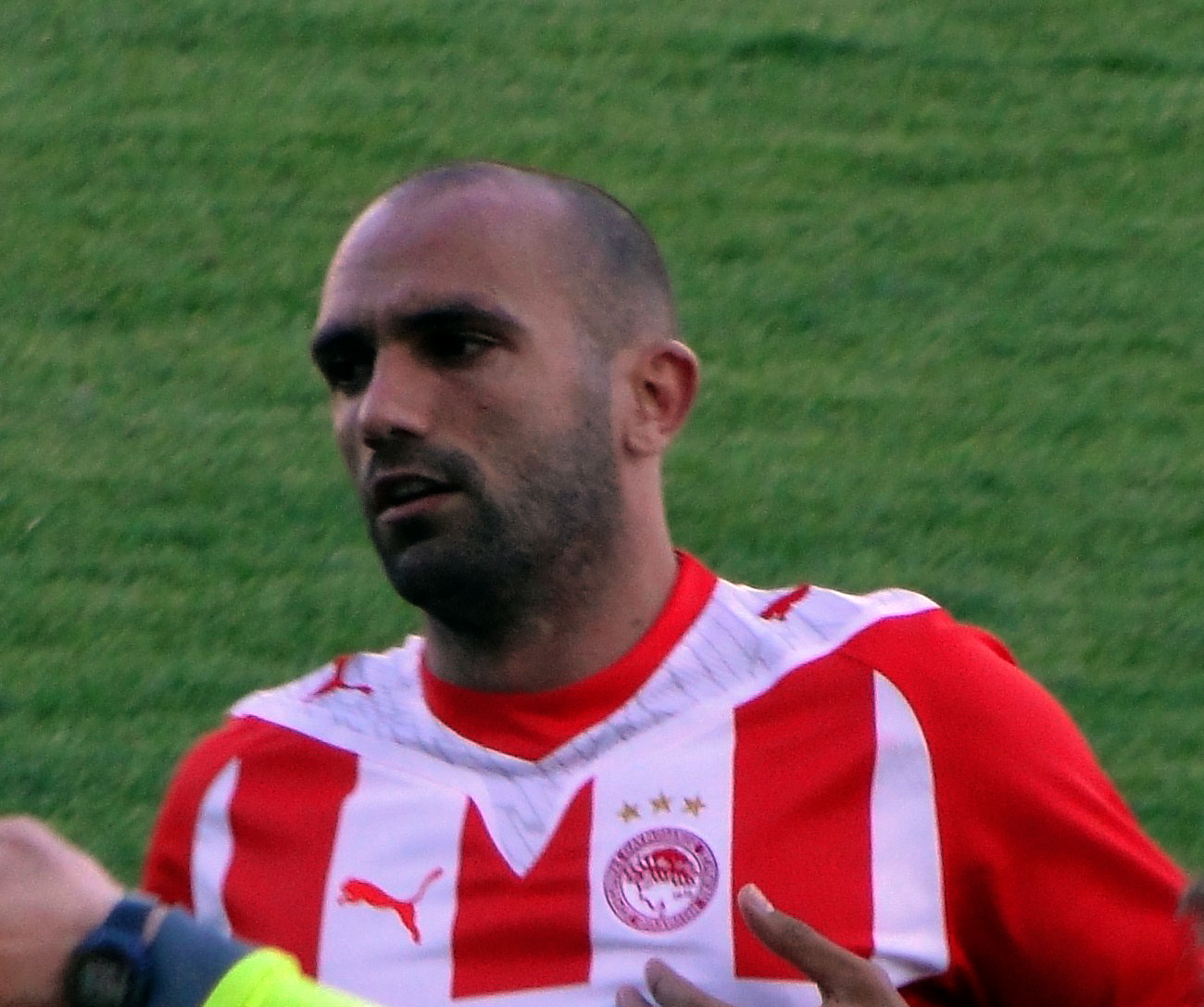
Raúl Bravo

A

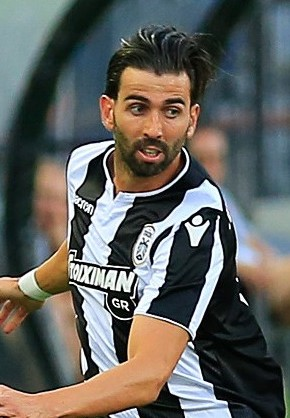
José Ángel Crespo

- Carlos Abad – Skoda Xanthi – 2019–2020
- Noé Acosta – Olympiacos Volos, Aris, Levadiakos, PAS Giannina, Lamia, AEL – 2010–2013, 2014–2019
- David Aganzo – Aris – 2012–2014
- Juan Aguilera – Platanias – 2012–2015
- Julio Alonso – Kalamata – 2026–
- Pablo Amo – Panserraikos – 2010–2011
- Añete – Apollon Smyrnis – 2017–2018
- Igor Angulo – Platanias – 2015–2016
- Apoño – OFI – 2014–2015
- César Arzo – AEK Athens – 2015–2016
- Pichu Atienza – Asteras Tripolis – 2021–2024

B

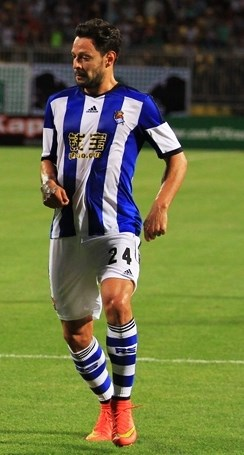
Alberto de la Bella

- Raúl Baena – Atromitos – 2019–2020
- Mahamadou Balde – PAOK, Levadiakos – 2025–
- Bernabé Barragán – Athens Kallithea – 2024–2025
- Isaac Becerra – Panionios – 2009–2010
- Iker Begoña – Levadiakos – 2009–2011
- Alberto Belsué – Iraklis – 2000–2001
- Asier Benito – Asteras Tripolis – 2022–2023
- Jefté Betancor – Panserraikos, Olympiacos – 2024–2026
- Juanjo Bezares – OFI – 2009
- Pep Biel – Olympiacos – 2022–2026
- Iker Bilbao – PAS Giannina – 2022–2024
- Alberto Botía – Olympiacos, A.E. Kifisia – 2014–2018, 2023–2024, 2025–2026
- Raúl Bravo – Olympiacos, Veria – 2007–2011, 2014–2015, 2016
- Alberto Bueno – Volos, Ionikos – 2021–2022
- Manu Busto – Levadiakos – 2013

C

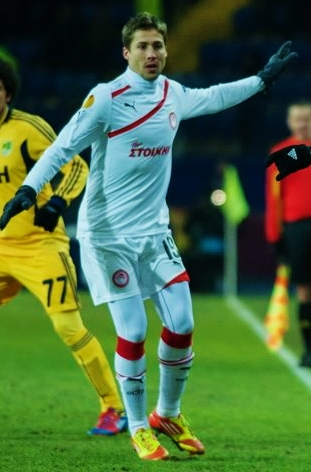
David Fuster

- Carlos Caballero – Panathinaikos, Veria – 2015
- Cala – AEK Athens – 2011–2012
- Juanmi Callejón – Levadiakos – 2013
- Carlos Calvo – Skoda Xanthi – 2013–2015
- Toni Calvo – Aris, Veria – 2007–2011, 2016–2017
- José Cañas – PAOK, Ionikos – 2016–2019, 2021–2023
- Sergi Canós – Olympiacos – 2023
- Aitor Cantalapiedra – Panathinaikos, OFI – 2020–2024, 2026–
- Eneko Capilla – Asteras Tripolis – 2019–2023
- Caracol – Ionikos –
- David Carmona – Asteras Tripolis – 2021–2024
- Carlinos – Veria – 2012–2013
- Carlitos – Panathinaikos, Lamia, Atromitos – 2020–2022, 2023–2025
- José Carlos – AEK Athens – 2011–2012
- Jorge Casado – Xanthi – 2017–2019, 2020
- Pablo Casar – Panthrakikos – 2009–2010
- José María Cases – Panthrakikos – 2013–2015
- Nacho Cases – Volos – 2020–2021
- Pepe Castaño – Asteras Tripolis – 2020–2026
- Dani Castellano – Atromitos – 2021–2022
- Cristian Castells – Platanias – 2013
- Marc Castells – Asteras Tripolis – 2012–2013
- José Catalá – Veria – 2014–2015
- David Cerrajería – Platanias – 2013–2014
- Alejandro Chacopino – AEL – 2017
- Changui – Skoda Xanthi – 2005–2006
- Chema – Skoda Xanthi – 2013–2014
- Sergio Chica – Volos – 2019–2020
- Pedro Chirivella – Panathinaikos – 2025–
- Thomas Christiansen – Panionios – 1999–2000
- Sergio Cirio – Atromitos – 2007–2008
- Pablo Coira – Aris – 2006–2007
- Pedro Conde – PAS Giannina, Volos – 2016–2018, 2021–2025
- Miguel Cordero – AEK Athens – 2012–2013, 2015–2016
- José Ángel Crespo – PAOK – 2016–2022
- Julián Cuesta – Aris – 2018–2025

D

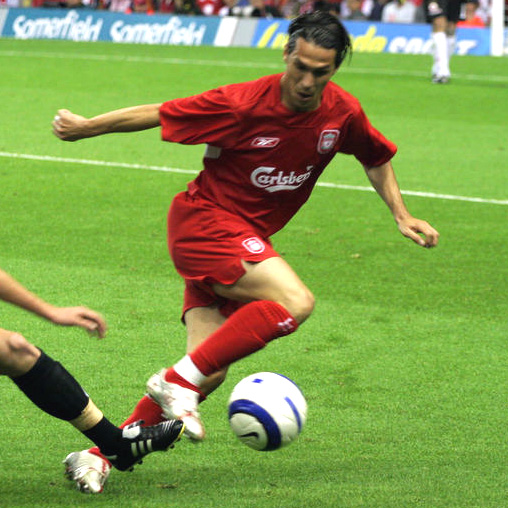
Luis García

- Alberto de la Bella – Olympiacos – 2016–2017
- Pablo de Lucas – Xanthi – 2016–2020
- Javier de Pedro – Ergotelis – 2006
- Didac Devesa – Platanias, Apollon Smyrnis – 2016–2018
- Juan Domínguez – PAS Giannina, Asteras Tripolis – 2020–2023

E

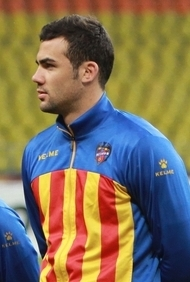
Vicente Iborra

- Aritz Elustondo – PAOK – 2026–
- Jon Erice – Kerkyra – 2012
- Aarón Escudero – Aris – 2006–2007
- Jokin Esparza – Panathinaikos, Veria – 2013, 2014–2015
- Diego Esteban – Panetolikos – 2025–

F

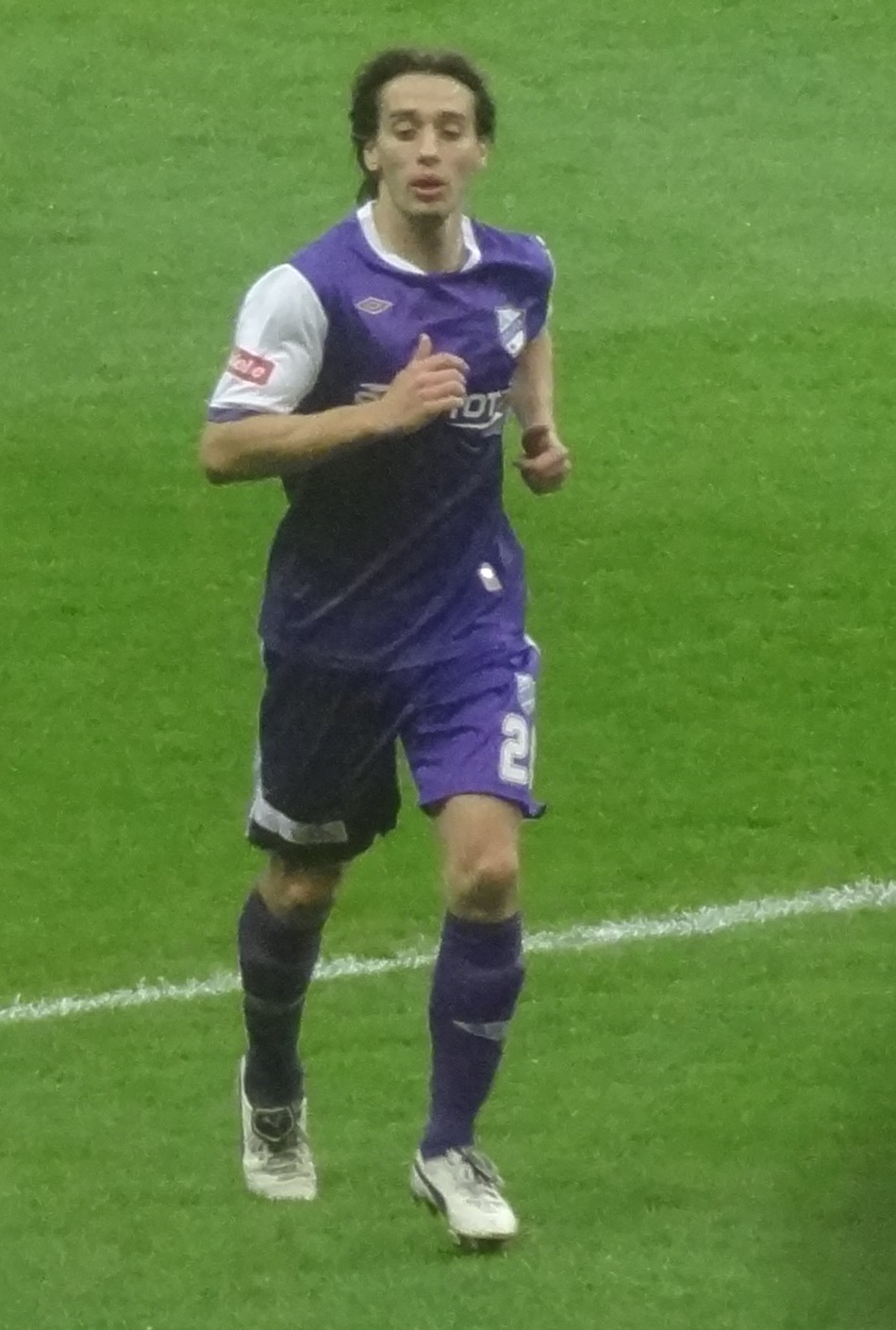
Javito

- Valentino Fattore – Aris – 2023–2025
- Paolo Fernandes – Volos, AEK Athens – 2021–
- Borja Fernández – Asteras Tripolis – 2019–2021
- Dani Fernández – OFI – 2014–2015
- Dani Fernández – Asteras Tripolis – 2025–2026
- Jesús Fernández – Panetolikos – 2020
- Luis Fernández – Asteras Tripolis – 2019–2021
- Victor Fernández – Volos – 2022–2023
- Marc Fernández – Asteras Tripolis, Apollon Smyrnis – 2018–2022
- David Fuster – Olympiacos – 2010–2016
- Fonsi – PAS Giannina, Apollon Smyrnis – 2014–2017, 2018–2019

G

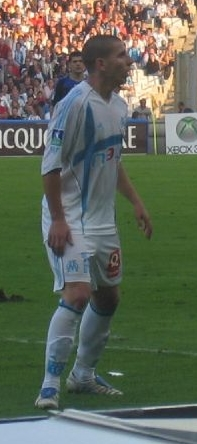
Koke

- Aitor García – Atromitos – 2025–2026
- Álvaro García – Asteras Tripolis – 2012–2013
- Dani García – Olympiacos – 2005–2007
- Dani García – Olympiacos, Atromitos – 2024–
- Jonan García – Aris, AEL Kalloni – 2007, 2013–2014
- Kevin García – Panetolikos – 2014–2016, 2020
- Luis García – Panathinaikos – 2010–2011
- Manu García – Aris – 2022–2025, 2026–
- Rubén García – Asteras Tripolis – 2020–2025
- Unai García – Panetolikos – 2025–2026
- Boris Garrós – Apollon Smyrnis – 2018–2019
- Jaime Gavilán – Platanias – 2015
- Nacho Gil – Volos – 2025
- Xavi Ginard – Veria – 2014–2015
- Borja González – OFI – 2024–
- Eder González – Atromitos, Asteras Tripolis – 2022–
- Toni González – PAOK – 2006–2008
- Iker Guarrotxena – Volos – 2020–2021
- Miguel Ángel Guerrero – Olympiacos, OFI – 2018–2020, 2022–2023
- Guille – Veria, Panthrakikos – 2012–2015

H

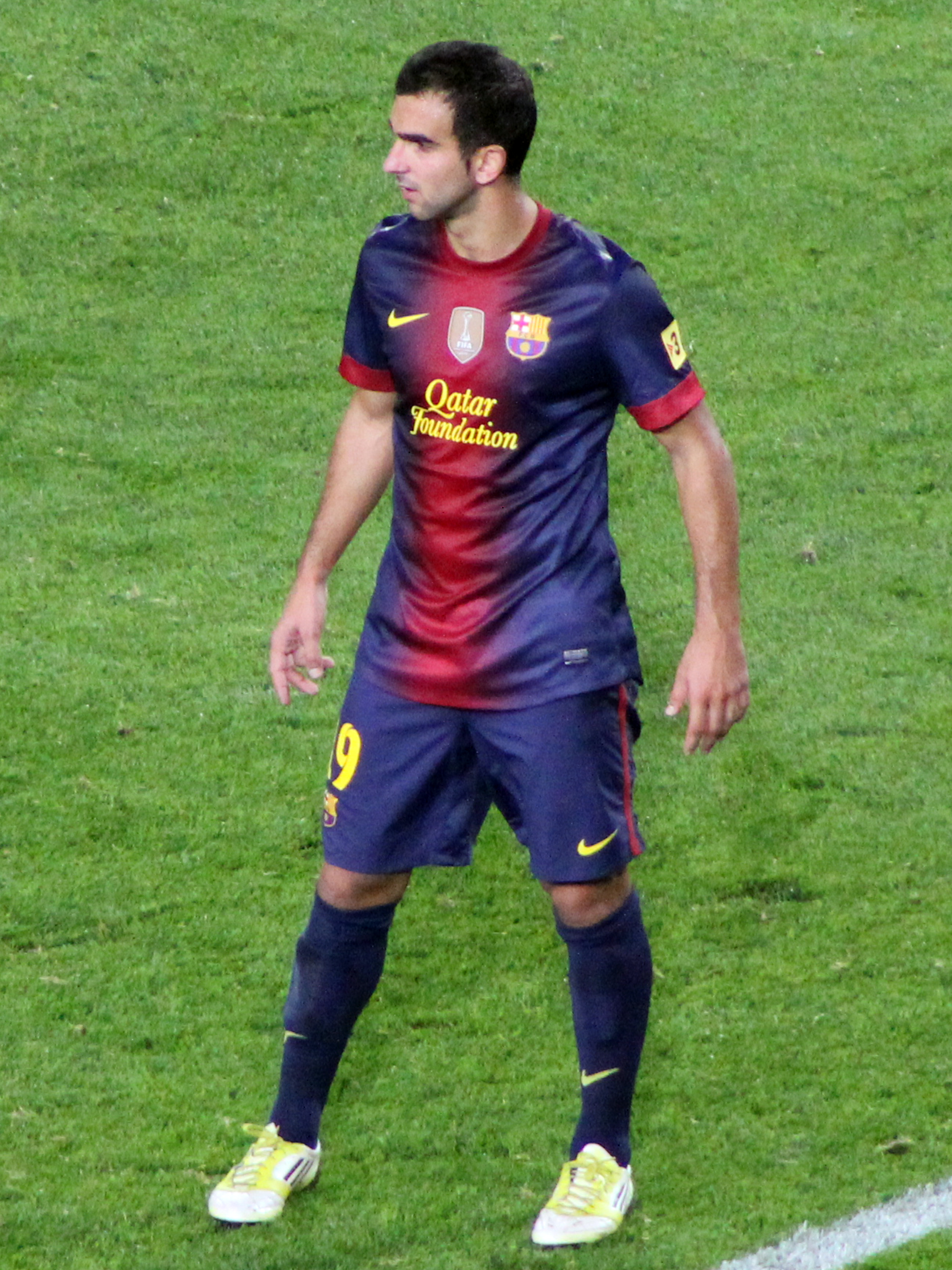
Martín Montoya

- Javi Hernández – Panathinaikos – 2026
- Moisés Hurtado – Olympiacos – 2010–2011

I

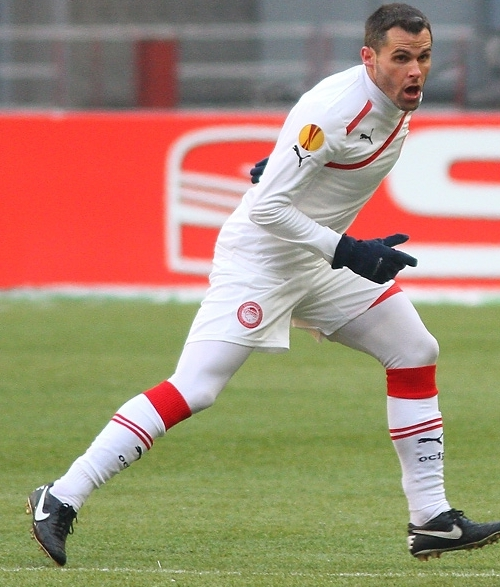
Pablo Orbaiz

- Vicente Iborra – Olympiacos – 2023–2024
- Ivi – Iraklis – 2026–

J

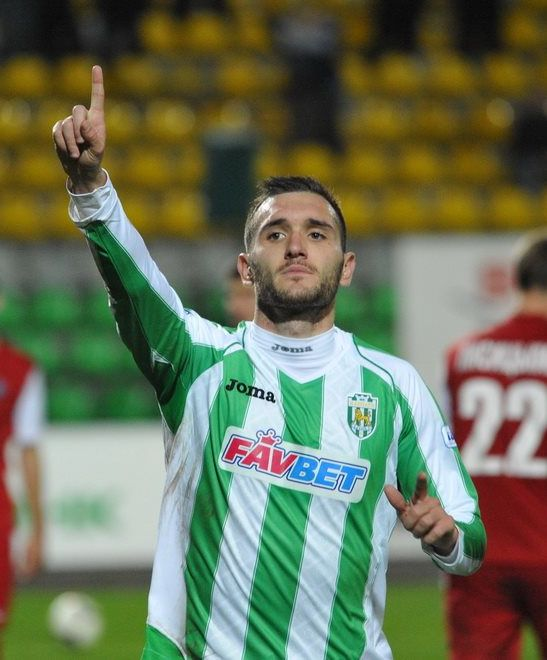
Lucas Pérez

- Eneko Jauregi – Asteras Tripolis – 2019–2020
- Javito – Aris, Olympiacos, Kerkyra, Panthrakikos – 2006–2012, 2014–2016
- Eusebio Alexander Vílchez Jimenez – Ionikos – 2001–2002
- Jesús Jiménez – OFI – 2024
- Josemi – Iraklis, Levadiakos, Skoda Xanthi – 2010–2011, 2012–2014
- Juanfran – AEK Athens – 2008–2009
- Juanito – Asteras Tripolis – 2011–2013
- Juankar – Panathinaikos, Aris – 2020–2025
- Juanlu – AEL Kalloni – 2013–2014
- Juanma – Aris – 2010–2011
- Juanma – Asteras Tripolis, AEL Kalloni – 2013–2015
- Juli – Asteras Tripolis – 2011–2012

K

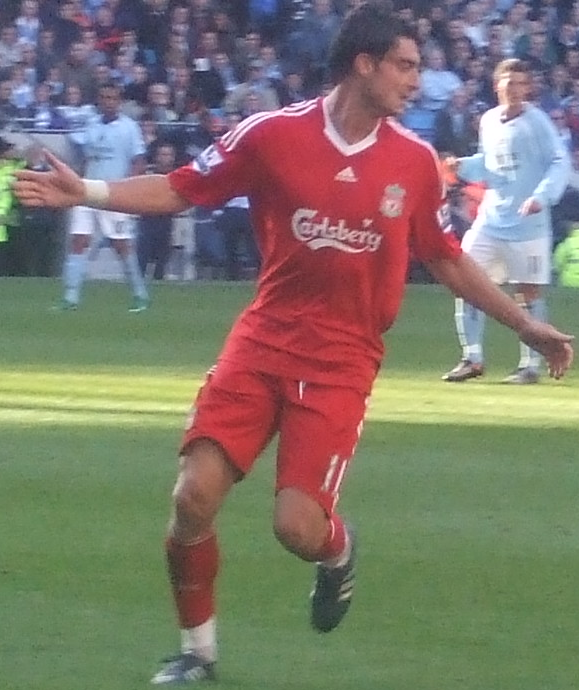
Albert Riera

- Koke – Aris, Veria – 2006–2011, 2015

L

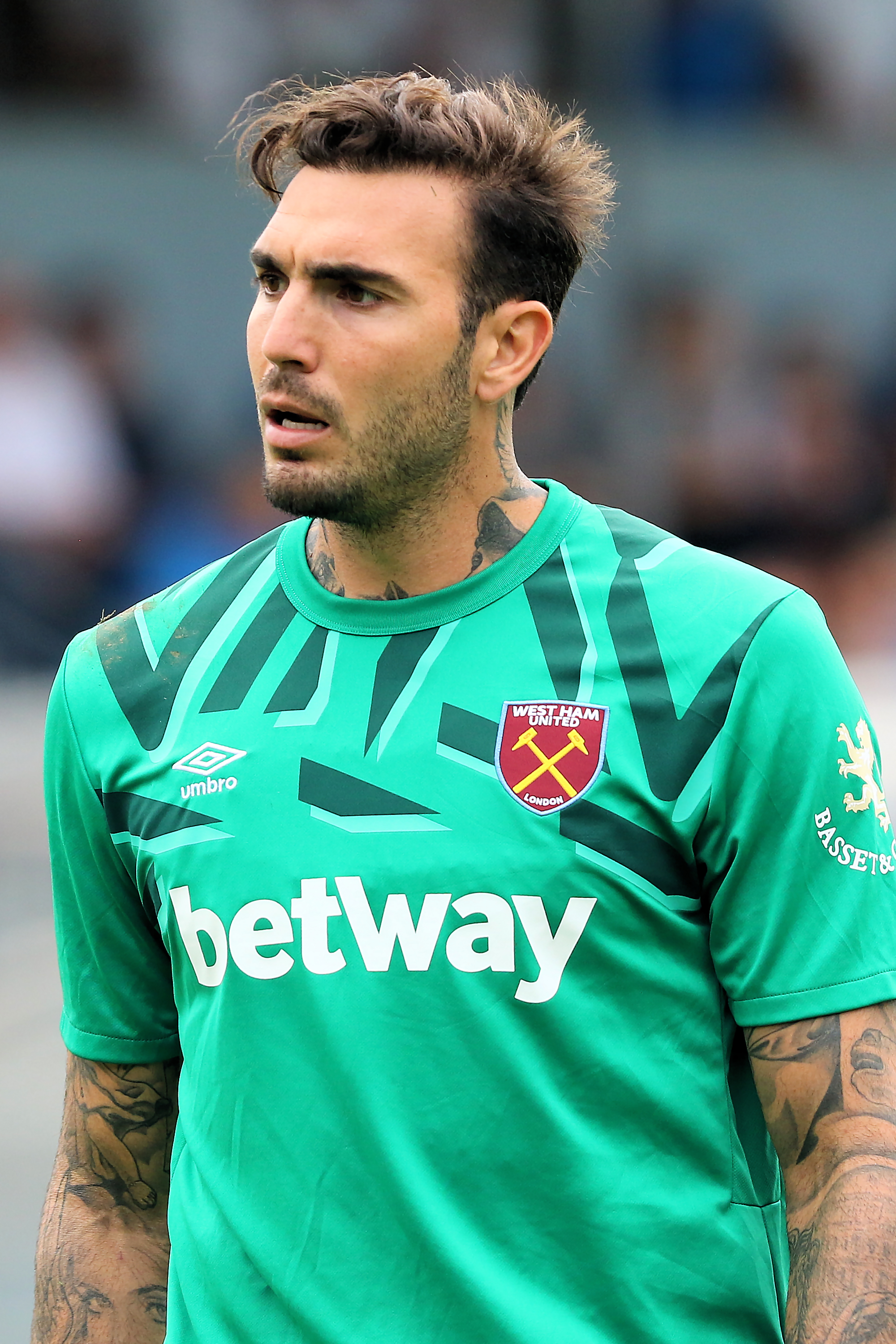
Roberto

- Manuel Lanzarote – Asteras Tripolis – 2015–2016
- Diego León – Kerkyra – 2012–2013
- Raúl Llorente – AEL Kalloni, Platanias – 2014–2016
- Cristian Lobato – Asteras Tripolis – 2015
- Cristian López – Aris – 2020–2022
- Íñigo López – PAOK – 2013–2014
- Jonathan López – Veria – 2012–2014, 2015–2017
- Jordi López – OFI – 2011–2012
- Jorge López – OFI – 2011–2012
- Julián López – Panthrakikos – 2009
- Oriol Lozano – Aris – 2010–2011
- Antonio Luna – Volos – 2022–2024

M

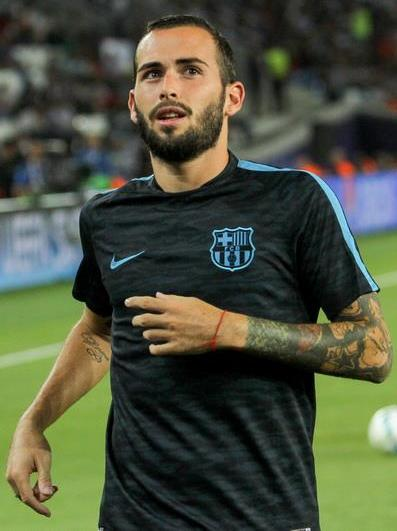
Aleix Vidal

- Pablo Maffeo – Olympiacos – 2026–
- Hugo Mallo – Aris – 2024–2025
- Iván Malón – Veria – 2014–2017
- Christian Manrique – Panetolikos – 2025–
- Juan José Maqueda – Panionios – 1999–2000
- Iván Marcano – Olympiacos – 2011–2012, 2014
- Fernando Marqués – Iraklis – 2007–2009
- Aarón Martín – Kalamata – 2026–
- Jordi Martín – AEL Kalloni – 2015
- Ángel Martínez – Asteras Tripolis, Lamia – 2018–2020, 2021–2022
- Manolo Martínez – Levadiakos – 2013–2014
- Rubén Martínez – Lamia – 2023–2024
- Javi Martos – Iraklis – 2008–2010
- David Mateos – AEK Athens – 2011
- Javier Matilla – Aris, Volos, Athens Kallithea – 2018–2023, 2024–2025
- Álvaro Mejía – Ergotelis – 2013–2014
- Melli – Ergotelis – 2014–2015
- Álex Menéndez – Aris – 2018–2020
- Carlos Merino – Panthrakikos – 2013–2014
- Míchel – AEK Athens – 2011
- Jero Miñarro – Panachaiki – 1999–2000
- Rafa Mir – Aris – 2026–
- Monchu – Aris – 2024–
- Sergio Molina – Panthrakikos – 2014
- Martín Montoya – Aris – 2023–2025
- Toni Moral – Platanias – 2013–2014
- Erik Morán – AEK Athens – 2018–2019
- Xavi Moro – Iraklis – 2007–2008
- Loren Morón – Aris – 2023–
- Álex Mula – Lamia – 2023–2024
- Juan Muñiz – Volos, Atromitos – 2019–2022
- Dani Muñoz – Iraklis – 2026–
- Miki Muñoz – Asteras Tripolis – 2024–

N

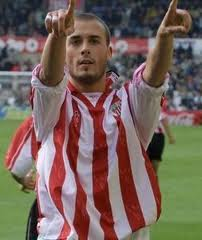
Francisco Yeste

- Matías Nahuel – Olympiacos – 2018–2019
- Nano – Panathinaikos – 2013–2016
- Fran Navarro – Olympiacos – 2024
- Ximo Navarro – Asteras Tripolis, AEL Kalloni, Levadiakos, AEL – 2011–2015, 2016–2018
- Dani Nieto – Skoda Xanthi – 2015–2017
- Aarón Ñíguez – Iraklis – 2008
- Nili – Platanias – 2018–2019
- Braulio Nóbrega – AEL Kalloni – 2016

O

- Joan Oriol – Atromitos – 2017–2018
- Pablo Orbaiz – Olympiacos – 2011–2012
- Daniel Orozco – Asteras Tripolis – 2010–2013
- Armiche Ortega – Levadiakos, Lamia – 2013–2015, 2018
- César Ortiz – Aris – 2010
- Óscar – Olympiacos – 2008–2010
- Jonny Otto – PAOK – 2024–2025

P

- Rubén Palazuelos – Aris – 2006–2007
- Rubén Pardo – Aris – 2023–2025
- Iñaki Peña – Panathinaikos – 2026–
- Luis Perea – OFI – 2022–2023
- Álex Pérez – Aris – 2007
- Álex Pérez – Kalamata – 2026–
- Carles Pérez – Aris – 2025–2026
- Lucas Pérez – PAOK – 2013–2015
- Rubén Pérez – Panathinaikos, A.E. Kifisia – 2021–2026
- Íñigo Piña – Iraklis – 2026–
- Pinchi – Volos – 2025–2026
- Pipa – Olympiacos – 2022–2023
- Piti – Lamia, AEL – 2017–2019, 2021
- Jorge Pombo – A.E. Kifisia – 2025–
- Álvaro Portilla – Aris – 2010
- Cristian Portilla – Aris – 2010–2012
- Rubén Pulido – Asteras Tripolis, Aris – 2010–2014

Q

- Quini – Olympiacos, Atromitos – 2023–2026

R

- Miguel Ángel Ramos – Atromitos – 2007–2008
- Álvaro Ratón – Lamia – 2024–2025
- Kiko Ratón – Iraklis – 2008–2009
- Rubén Rayos – Asteras Tripolis – 2011–2013
- Francesc Regis – Asteras Tripolis, , Volos – 2019–2025, 2026–
- Manolo Reina – Atromitos – 2013
- Álvaro Rey – Panetolikos – 2017
- José Reyes – Aris, Atromitos, Levadiakos – 2006–2008
- Adrián Riera – Asteras Tripolis, OFI, Panserraikos – 2019–2025, 2026–
- Albert Riera – Olympiacos – 2010–2011
- Sito Riera – Panthrakikos, Panionios – 2008–2011
- Roberto – Olympiacos – 2013–2016
- Joel Roca – Olympiacos – 2026–
- José Manuel Roca – Panthrakikos, Olympiacos Volos, Doxa Drama – 2008–2012
- Carlos Rodríguez – Iraklis – 2026–
- Joan Román – Panetolikos – 2019–2020

S

- Felipe Sanchón – Aris – 2007–2009
- Jacobo Sanz – Asteras Tripolis, PAOK – 2011–2015
- Borja Sánchez – Kerkyra – 2014–2015
- Sergio Sánchez – Panathinaikos – 2015–2016
- Víctor Sánchez – Panathinaikos – 2006–2007
- Dani Santafé – Asteras Tripolis – 2021–2023
- Omar Santana – Lamia – 2023–2024
- Adrián Sardinero – OFI – 2020–2021
- Josu Sarriegi – Panathinaikos – 2007–2012
- Joan Sastre – PAOK – 2022–2026
- Jonathan Sesma – Asteras Tripolis – 2011
- David Simón – Lamia, A.E. Kifisia – 2022–2024, 2025–2026
- Sisi – Veria – 2016–2017
- Sito – Asteras Tripolis – 2019–2024
- Kike Sola – Levadiakos – 2010
- Carles Soria – PAS Giannina, Lamia, Volos, Iraklis – 2022–
- Dani Suárez – Asteras Tripolis, Atromitos – 2019–2021, 2022–2023
- Rubén Suárez – Skoda Xanthi – 2013–2014

T

- Álvaro Tejero – Aris – 2025–2026
- Tekio – Volos – 2020–2021
- Brandon Thomas – PAOK – 2022–2025
- Toché – Panathinaikos – 2011–2013
- Antonio Tomás – Veria – 2016–2017
- Joan Tomàs – Lamia – 2019
- Jon Toral – OFI – 2021–2024
- David Torres – Platanias – 2013–2015
- Miguel Torres – Olympiacos – 2013–2014
- Tyronne – Lamia – 2019–2020, 2021–2022

U

- Fernando Usero – Asteras Tripolis, Atromitos – 2011–2016

V

- José Luis Valiente – Asteras Tripolis – 2018–2024
- Javier López Vallejo – Levadiakos, Kavala – 2010–2011
- David Vázquez – Veria – 2014–2015
- Juan Velasco – Panthrakikos, AEL – 2008–2009, 2010–2011
- Fran Vélez – Aris, Panathinaikos – 2018–2022, 2023–2025
- Fede Vico – Asteras Tripolis – 2023–2024
- Aleix Vidal – Panthrakikos – 2008–2009
- Jordi Vidal – AEL Kalloni – 2014–2015
- Dídac Vilà – AEK Athens – 2015–2017
- Villa – Skoda Xanthi – 2000–2001
- Miguel Villarejo – Veria, Panthrakikos – 2012–2013
- Vitolo – Aris, PAOK, Panathinaikos – 2008–2013

W

- Walter – Skoda Xanthi, Panthrakikos – 2015–2016
- Óscar Whalley – OFI – 2019–2020

X

Y

- Francisco Yeste – Olympiacos – 2011–2012

Z

- Antonio Zarzana – Volos – 2025–2026

=== Sweden ===
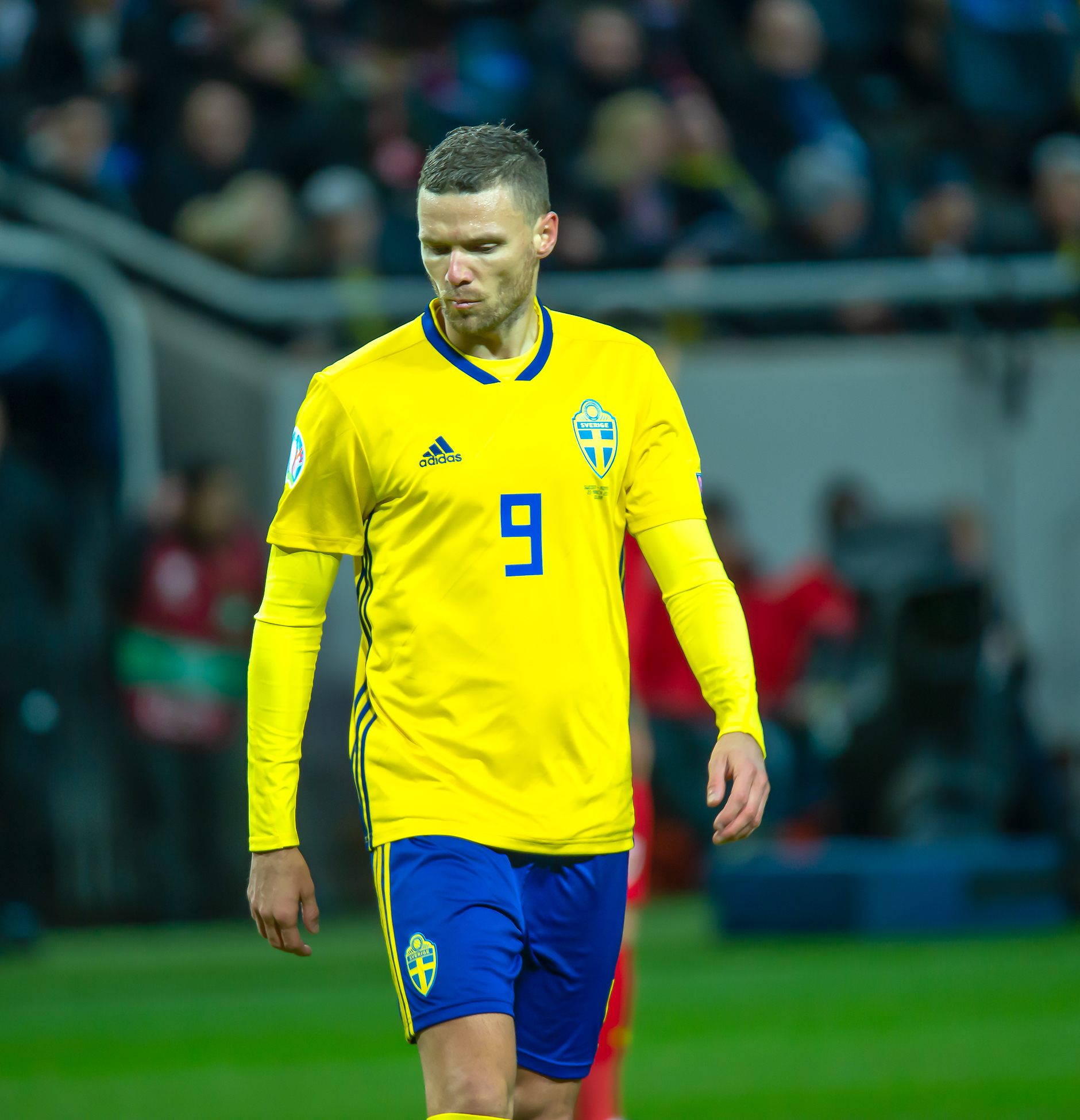
Marcus Berg

A

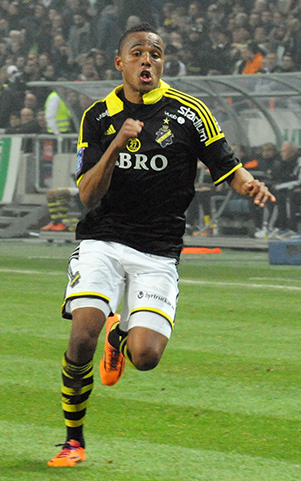
Niclas Eliasson

- Thomas Ahlström – Olympiacos – 1979–1982
- Taha Ali – PAOK – 2026–
- Robert Andersson – Iraklis – 1998–1999
- Mikael Antonsson – Panathinaikos – 2006–2007

B

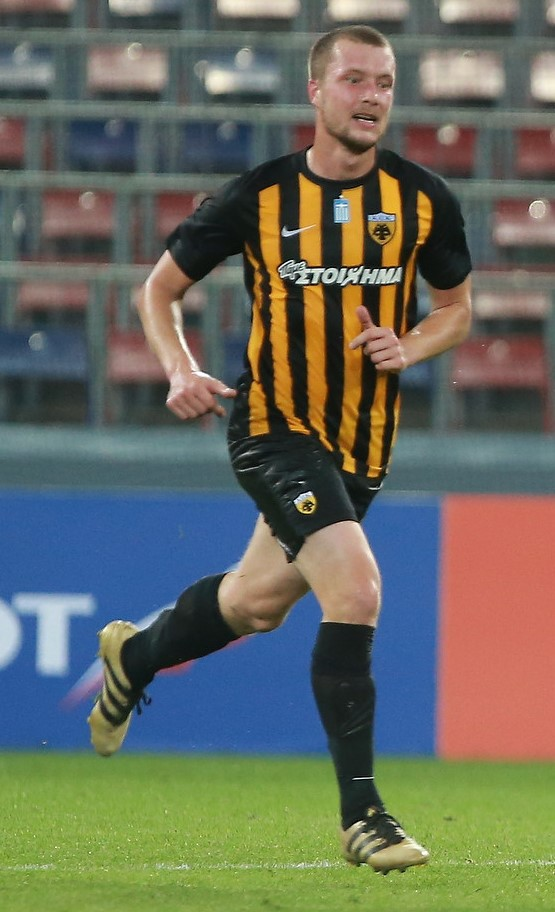
Jakob Johansson

- Emir Bajrami – Panathinaikos – 2013–2015
- Admir Bajrovic – Panetolikos, Panserraikos – 2019–2020, 2023–2024
- Kennedy Bakircioglu – Iraklis – 2003–2005
- Marcus Berg – Panathinaikos – 2013–2017
- Emil Bergström – Panserraikos – 2023–2025
- Valmir Berisha – Panathinaikos – 2014–2015
- Mattias Bjärsmyr – Panathinaikos – 2009–2012
- Jonas Tommy Bodin – Kalamata – 1997–1998
- Franz Brorsson – Atromitos, Asteras Tripolis – 2024–2025, 2026–

C

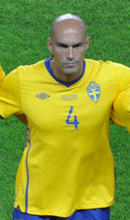
Daniel Majstorović

- Louay Chanko – AEK Athens – 2005–2006

D

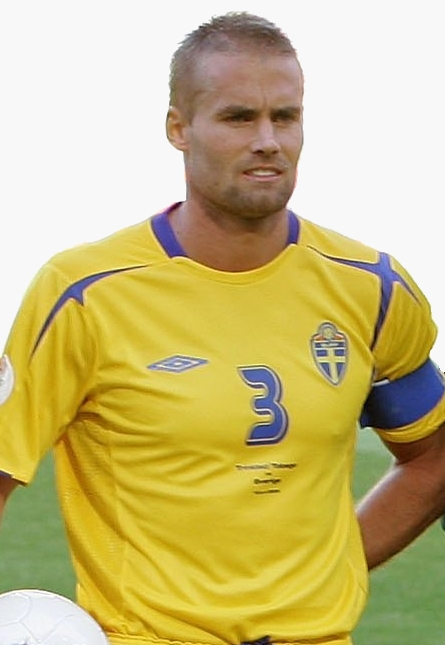
Olof Mellberg

- Mikael Dahlberg – Apollon Smyrnis – 2013–2014
- Nikolaos Dosis – Volos – 2024–2025
- Jimmy Durmaz – Olympiacos – 2014–2016

E

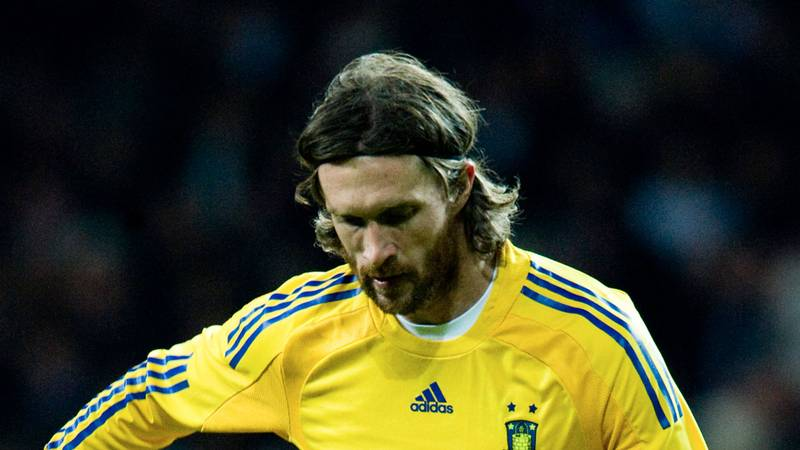
Mikael Nilsson

- Niclas Eliasson – AEK Athens – 2022–
- Sebastian Eriksson – Panetolikos – 2018–2019
- Ulf Eriksson – Aris – 1983–1985
- August Erlingmark – Atromitos – 2022–2024

F

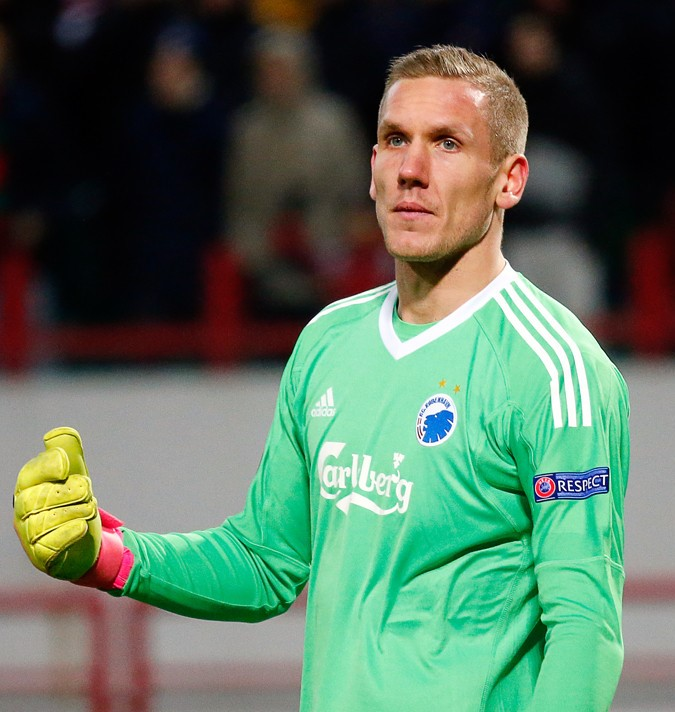
Robin Olsen

- Alexander Fransson – AEK Athens – 2022–2023

G

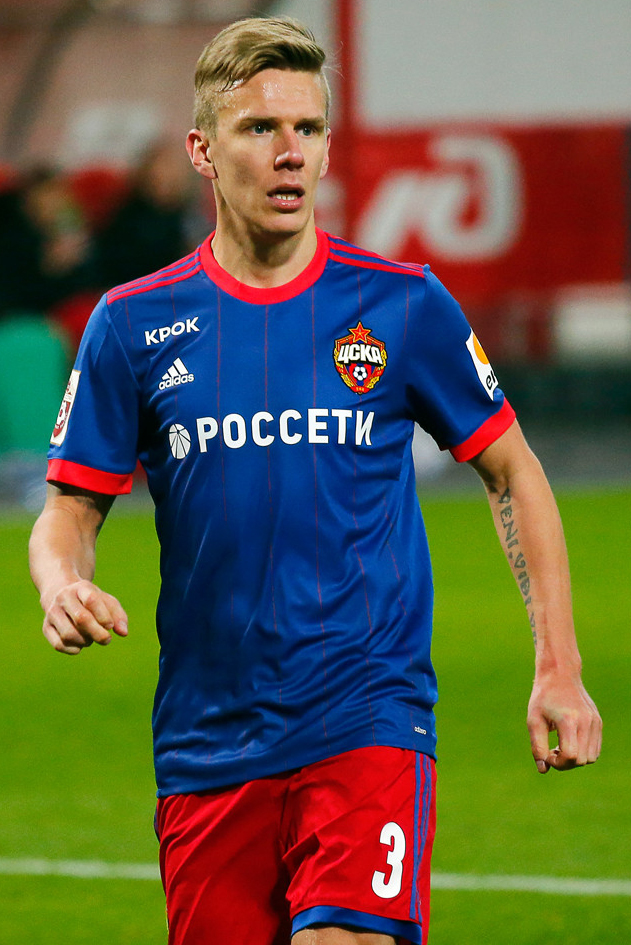
Pontus Wernbloom

- Gustav Granath – Panetolikos – 2026–

H

- Philip Hellquist – PAS Giannina – 2018
- Oscar Hiljemark – Panathinaikos – 2017–2018
- Niklas Hult – Panathinaikos, AEK Athens – 2016–2018, 2018–2020

I

J

- Alexander Jeremejeff – Panathinaikos, Levadiakos, PAOK – 2023–2026
- Jakob Johansson – AEK Athens – 2015–2018
- Mattias Johansson – Panathinaikos – 2017–2020
- Markus Jonsson – Panionios – 2010–2011

K

- Magnus Källander – Aris, Iraklis – 2003–2004
- David Moberg Karlsson – Aris – 2023–2024
- Joachim Karlsson – Kalamata – 1996–1998
- Sonny Karlsson – AEL Kalloni – 2016

L

- Daniel Larsson – Aris – 2019–2020
- Eric Larsson – OFI – 2022–2024
- Jacob Une Larsson – Panetolikos – 2022–2023
- Peter Larsson – Kalamata – 1996–1997
- Ramon Pascal Lundqvist – Panathinaikos – 2021–2022

M

- Daniel Majstorović – AEK Athens – 2008–2010
- Johan Mårtensson – Panetolikos – 2022–2023
- Guillermo Molins – Panathinaikos – 2017–2018
- Olof Mellberg – Olympiacos – 2009–2012

N

- Mikael Nilsson – Panathinaikos – 2005–2009

O

- Robin Olsen – PAOK – 2015–2016

P

- Sotiris Papagiannopoulos – PAOK – 2015
- Erik Pärsson – OFI – 2018–2019
- Dejan Pavlovic – Kavala – 1999–2000

Q

- Robin Quaison – Aris – 2024–2025

R

- Sebastian Ring – Lamia – 2024–2025
- Mikael Rönnberg – AEL – 1986–1987

S

- Filip Sachpekidis – Levadiakos – 2023
- Håkan Sandberg – AEK Athens, Olympiacos – 1985–1988
- Simon Sandberg – Lamia – 2024–2025
- Jonas Sandqvist – Atromitos – 2009–2010
- Filip Sidklev – Aris – 2024–2025
- Rasmus Sjöstedt – Panetolikos – 2019–2020
- Zinedin Smajlović – Olympiacos – 2026–
- Tom Söderberg – Apollon Smyrnis – 2013–2014
- Babis Stefanidis – Iraklis – 1998–2001
- Daniel Sundgren – Aris, Volos – 2019–2022, 2024–2025
- Jens Svensson – Egaleo – 2002

T

- Muamer Tanković – AEK Athens – 2020–2022
- Sharbel Touma – Iraklis – 2009–2010

U

V

W

- Pontus Wernbloom – PAOK – 2018–2020

X

Y

Z

- Pär Zetterberg – Olympiacos – 2000–2003

=== Switzerland ===
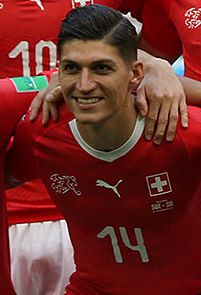
Steven Zuber

- Giuseppe Aquaro – Panetolikos – 2013–2014,
- Damian Bellón – Veria, Panetolikos – 2012–2014
- Samouil Drakopulos – AEK Athens – 1992–1995
- Remo Freuler – Olympiacos – 2026–
- Levent Gülen – Volos – 2021–2022
- Eldin Jakupović – Olympiacos Volos, Aris – 2010–2012
- Darko Jevtić – AEK Athens – 2021–2022
- Pajtim Kasami – Olympiacos – 2014–2016, 2022–2023
- Agapios Kaltaveridis – Olympiacos – 1988–1991
- Oumar Kondé – Panionios – 2006–2008
- Dereck Kutesa – AEK Athens – 2025–
- Riccardo Meili – Panionios – 2008–2009
- Jean-Pierre Rhyner – Volos – 2021–2022
- Fabian Stoller – Platanias – 2013–2014
- Joanis Vagias – Panionios, Apollon Athens – 1994–1995, 1996
- Fabrizio Zambrella – PAS Giannina – 2012
- Steven Zuber – AEK Athens, Atromitos – 2021–2024, 2026–

=== Turkey ===
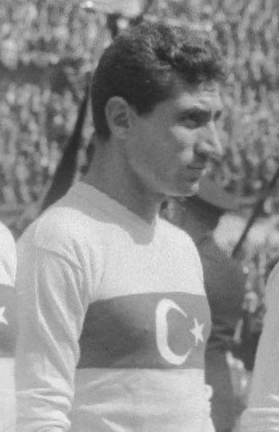
Lefter Küçükandonyadis

- Samet Akaydin – Panathinaikos – 2024
- Fatih Akyel – PAOK – 2005–2006
- Deniz Baykara – Skoda Xanthi, Panserraikos, Panthrakikos – 2001–2009, 2012–2016
- Erol Bulut – Panionios, Olympiacos, OFI – 2001–2003, 2005–2007, 2009–2010, 2011–2012
- Mete Kaan Demir – PAS Giannina – 2024
- Orhan Kaynak – Skoda Xanthi – 2001
- Colin Kazim-Richards – Olympiacos – 2012
- Erkan Kourak – Skoda Xanthi – 2004–2005
- Nikos Kovis – Panathinaikos, OFI – 1978–1985
- Lefter Küçükandonyadis – AEK Athens – 1963–1964
- Tümer Metin – AEL, Kerkyra – 2008–2012
- Emre Mor – Olympiacos – 2020–2021
- Yusuf Yazıcı – Olympiacos – 2024–
- Okan Yılmaz – Panthrakikos – 2008–2009
- Aleko Yordan – AEK Athens, Egaleo – 1962–1971

=== Ukraine ===
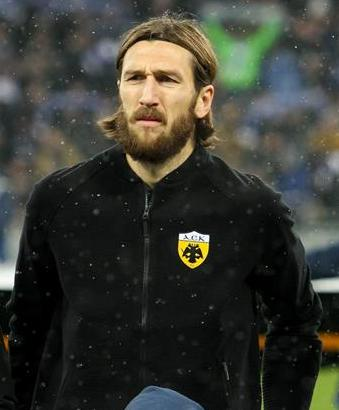
Dmytro Chyhrynskyi

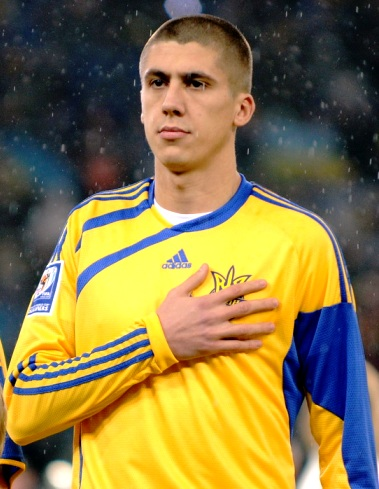
Yevhen Khacheridi

- Andriy Bohdanov – Ergotelis – 2014–2015
- Yevhen Budnik – Platanias, Lamia – 2017–2019
- Dmytro Chyhrynskyi – AEK Athens, Ionikos – 2016–2023
- Oleh Danchenko – AEK Athens – 2021–2024
- Ivan Demydenko – Asteras Tripolis – 2023
- Yevhen Dmytriev – Ethnikos Piraeus – 1997–1998
- Viktor Dvirnyk – AEL – 1995–1996
- Andriy Hircha – Ergotelis – 2004–2005
- Maksym Imerekov – Atromitos – 2023–2024
- Igor Kalinin – Panserraikos – 2025–2026
- Valeriy Karibov – Iraklis, Panachaiki – 1992–1998
- Yevhen Khacheridi – PAOK – 2018–2019
- Maksym Koval – Aris – 2024
- Yevhen Kucherenko – Panetolikos – 2026–
- Orest Kuzyk – PAS Giannina – 2018–2020
- Maksym Maksymenko – AEL – 2021
- Mykhaylo Mykhaylov – Apollon Athens – 1991–1992
- Hennadiy Lytovchenko – Olympiacos – 1990–1993
- Vladyslav Naumets – PAS Giannina – 2018–2021
- Yevhen Neplyakh – Platanias – 2014–2015
- Vasyl Novokhatskyi – Ionikos, Panachaiki – 1995–1996, 1997–1998
- Oleh Protasov – Olympiacos, Veria, Proodeftiki – 1990–1994, 1996–1999
- Vitaliy Pryndeta – Platanias, Lamia – 2016–2018
- Yevhen Selin – Platanias, Asteras Tripolis – 2015–2018
- Yevhen Shakhov – PAOK, AEK Athens – 2016–2019, 2020–2022
- Denys Sokolovskyi – Panionios – 2000
- Eduard Stoyanov – Ionikos – 2000–2001
- Vladyslav Sukhomlynov – Panachaiki – 2001
- Andriy Tsurikov – Levadiakos – 2016
- Oleh Venhlinskyi – AEK Athens – 2005–2006
- Roman Yaremchuk – Olympiacos – 2024–
- Oleh Yashchuk – Ergotelis – 2006–2007
- Oleksandr Zubkov – AEK Athens – 2026–

=== Wales ===
- Gareth Roberts – Panionios – 1999

== North, Central America and Caribbean (CONCACAF) ==
=== Canada ===
- Derek Cornelius – Panetolikos – 2021–2022
- Julian de Guzman – Skoda Xanthi – 2013–2014
- Manjrekar James – Lamia – 2021
- Stathis Kappos – Kalamata, AEK Athens, Akratitos, Aris – 1997–1998, 1999–2006
- John Limniatis – Aris – 1988–1992
- Tamandani Nsaliwa – Panionios, AEK Athens – 2006–2009
- Tomasz Radzinski – Skoda Xanthi – 2007–2008
- Kenny Stamatopoulos – Kalamata – 1999–2001
- Igor Vrablic – Olympiacos – 1986–1987
- Emmanuel Zambazis – Iraklis – 2015–2017

=== Costa Rica ===
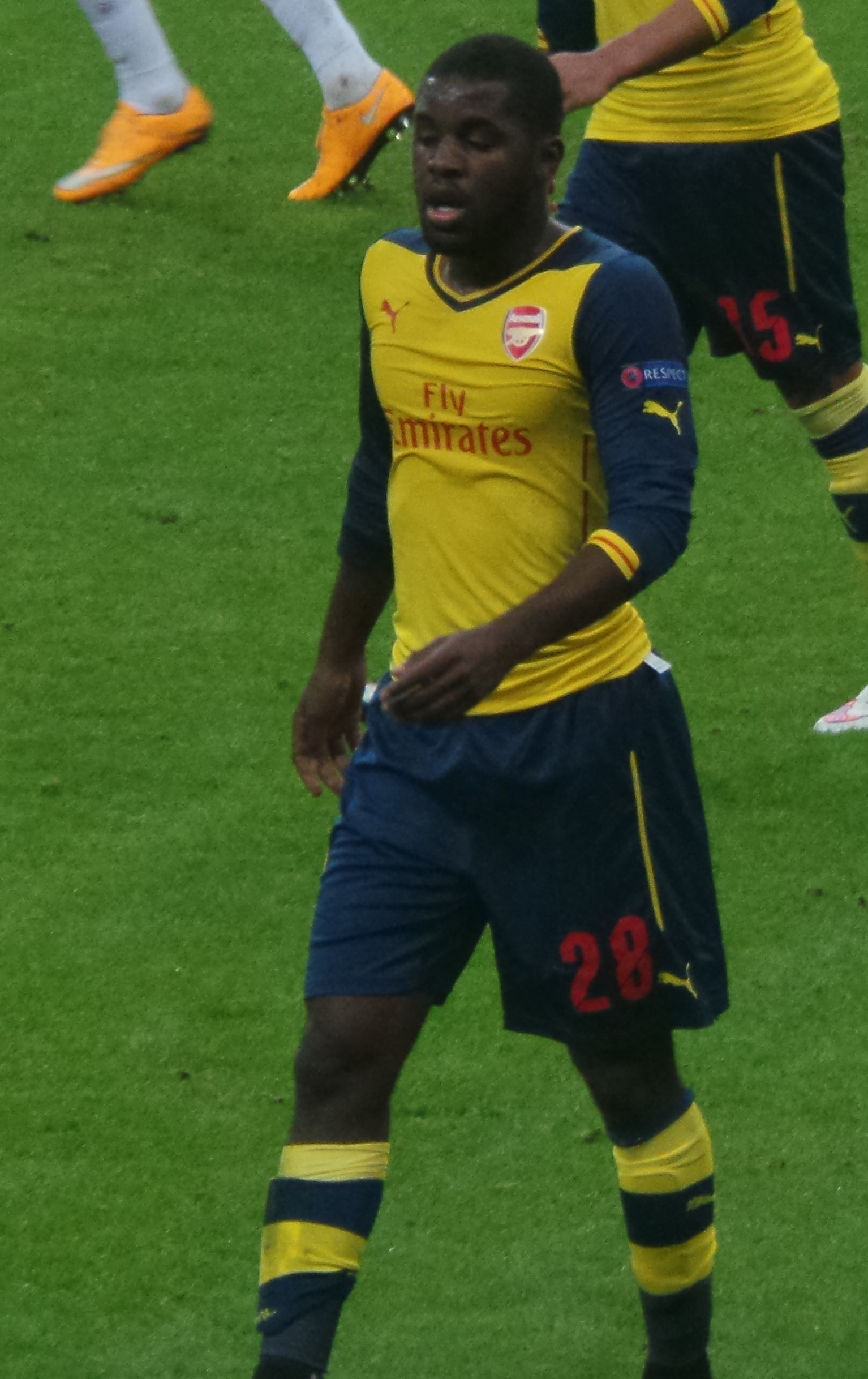
Joel Campbell

- Jewison Bennette – Aris – 2024
- Steven Bryce – OFI – 2006
- Joel Campbell – Olympiacos – 2013–2014
- Walter Centeno – AEK Athens – 2002–2003
- David Diach – Trikala, Paniliakos – 1999–2000
- Mayron George – OFI – 2014–2015
- Rónald Gómez – OFI – 1999–2002
- Froylán Ledezma – Akratitos – 2006
- Rónald Matarrita – Aris – 2023–2024
- Wilson Muñoz – OFI – 2000–2002
- Cristopher Núñez – Lamia – 2021–2024
- Berny Peña – Akratitos – 2006
- Enoc Pérez – Kavala – 2010–2011
- Alejandro Sequeira – Proodeftiki – 2000
- Alonso Solís – OFI – 1999–2001
- Mauricio Solís – OFI – 2002–2003
- William Sunsing – Akratitos – 2006
- Kenneth Vargas – Kalamata – 2026–
- Mauricio Wright – AEK Athens – 2002–2003
- Álvaro Zamora – Aris – 2023–2025

=== Cuba ===
- Jorge Aguirre – Panetolikos – 2025–

=== Curaçao ===
- Jeremy Antonisse – A.E. Kifisia – 2025–
- Chaly Jones – Skoda Xanthi – 2005–2006
- Roshon van Eijma – A.E. Kifisia – 2026–
- Charlton Vicento – PAS Giannina – 2013–2014

=== French Guiana ===
- Jean-Claude Darcheville – Kavala – 2010–2011

=== Grenada ===
- Craig Rocastle – Thrasyvoulos – 2008–2009

=== Guadeloupe ===
- Lenny Nangis – Levadiakos – 2018–2019
- Franck Grandel – Skoda Xanthi – 2003–2004
- Yvann Maçon – AEL – 2026

=== Guatemala ===
- Guillermo Ramírez – PAS Giannina – 2001
- Carlos Ruiz – PAS Giannina, Aris – 2001, 2010–2011

=== Haiti ===
- Frantz Bertin – OFI, Veria – 2009–2011, 2012–2013
- Kim Jaggy – Skoda Xanthi – 2009–2011
- Jean-Jacques Pierre – Panionios – 2012
- Frantzdy Pierrot – AEK Athens – 2024–

=== Honduras ===
- Kervin Arriaga – AEK Athens – 2026–
- Michaell Chirinos – Volos – 2023
- Carlo Costly – Veria – 2012–2013
- Deiby Flores – Panetolikos – 2021–2023
- Alfredo Mejía – Panthrakikos, Xanthi, Levadiakos – 2014–2018, 2022–2023, 2024–2025
- Milton Núñez – PAOK – 1999–2000
- Luis Palma – Aris, Olympiacos – 2022–2023, 2025
- Diego Reyes – AEL – 2017
- Edwin Rodríguez – Aris – 2022–2023

=== Jamaica ===
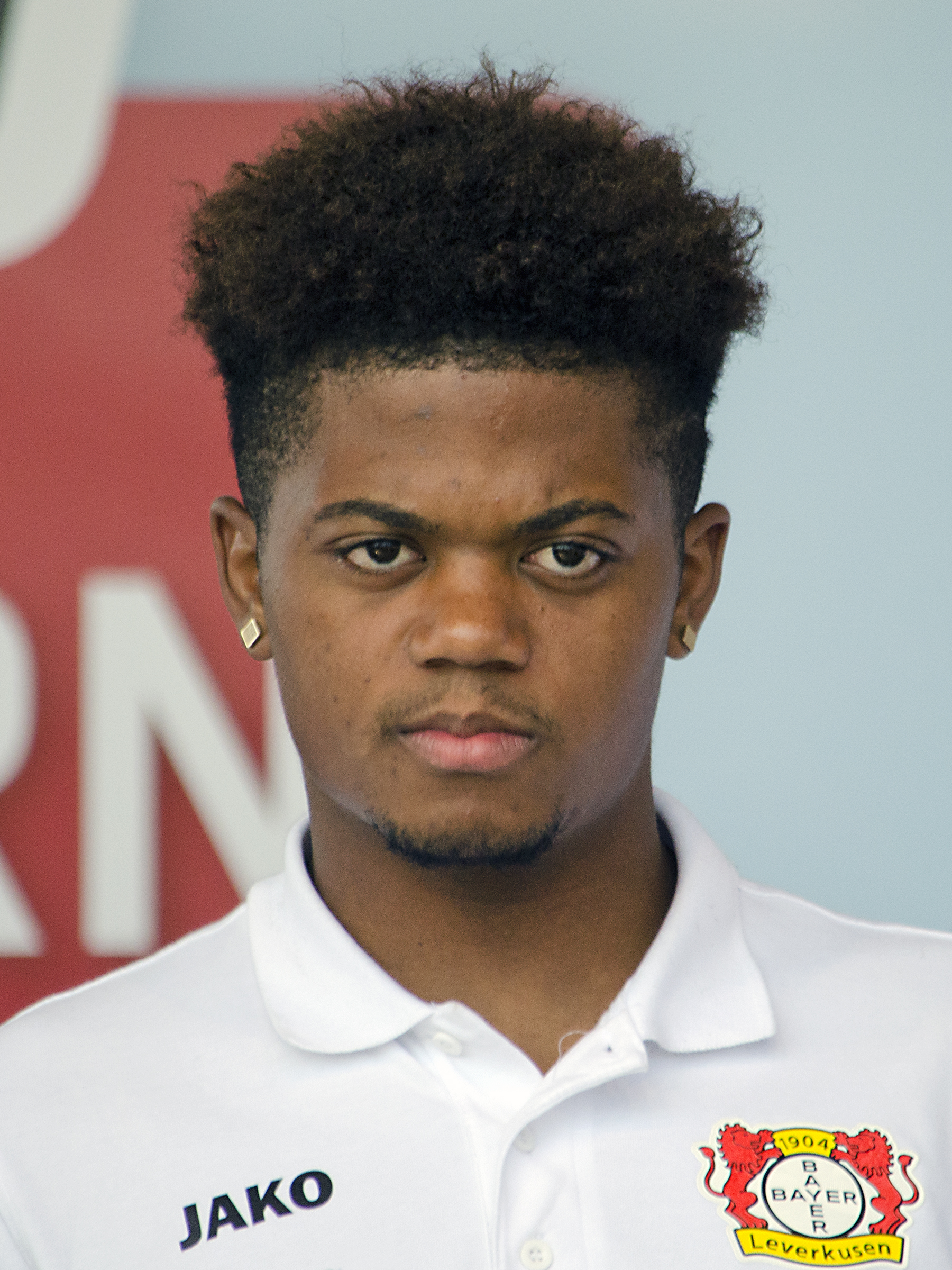
Leon Bailey

- Leon Bailey – Olympiacos – 2026–
- Andre Gray – Aris – 2022–2023
- James Serchwell – PAS Giannina – 1982–1983

=== Martinique ===
- Bédi Buval – Panthrakikos, Panionios – 2009–2010
- Ludovic Clément – Panthrakikos – 2008–2010
- Mickaël Malsa – Platanias – 2018
- Kévin Olimpa – Platanias – 2014–2016
- Sonhy Sefil – Asteras Tripolis – 2016–2017

=== Mexico ===
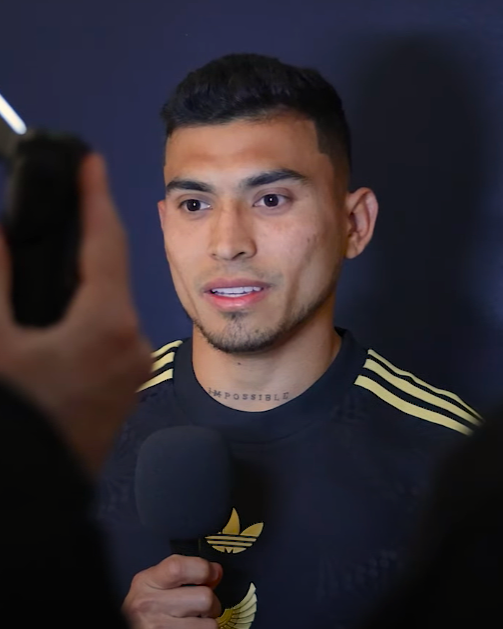
Orbelín Pineda

- Pedro Arce – Veria, Panionios – 2013–2017, 2019–2020
- Nery Castillo – Olympiacos, Aris – 2000–2007, 2011–2012
- Antonio de Nigris – AEL – 2009
- Armando González – Olympiacos – 2026–
- Paolo Medina – Panetolikos – 2020–2021
- Orbelín Pineda – AEK Athens – 2022–2026
- Rodolfo Pizarro – AEK Athens – 2023–2024
- Alan Pulido – Levadiakos, Olympiacos – 2015–2016
- Jorge Sánchez – PAOK – 2026
- Jordan Silva – OFI – 2024–2025
- Mariano Trujillo – Skoda Xanthi – 2007

=== Nicaragua ===
- Pablo Gállego – AEL – 2017

=== Panama ===
- Yoel Bárcenas – Iraklis – 2026–
- Julio Segundo – Veria – 2013–2014

=== Saint Kitts and Nevis ===
- Keith Gumbs – Panionios 1998–1999
- Febian Brandy – Panetolikos – 2012

=== Saint Martin (Collectivity of Saint Martin) ===
- Wilfried Dalmat – Panetolikos – 2014
- Cyril Kali – Asteras Tripolis, Panserraikos, Veria, Panetolikos – 2007–2009, 2012–2017
- Keelan Lebon – Athens Kallithea – 2025

=== Suriname ===
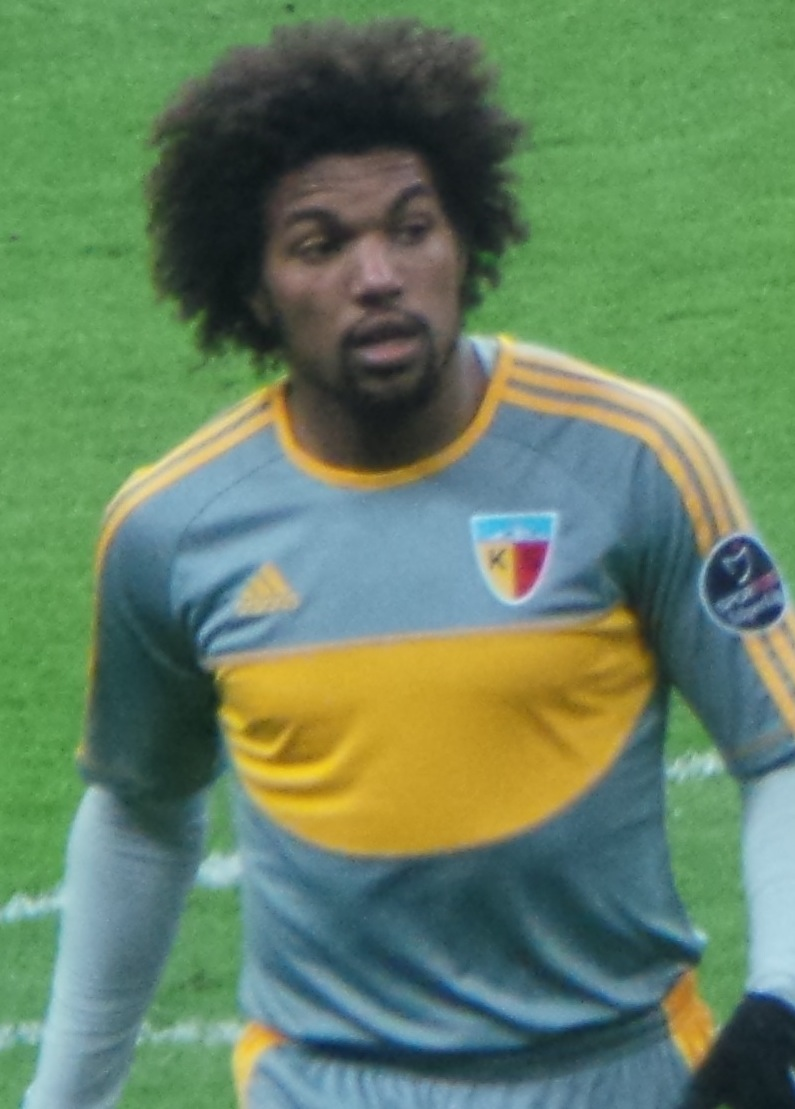
Diego Biseswar

- Diego Biseswar – PAOK – 2016–2023
- Damil Dankerlui – Panserraikos – 2023–2024
- Nigel Hasselbaink – Veria – 2014–2015

=== Trinidad and Tobago ===
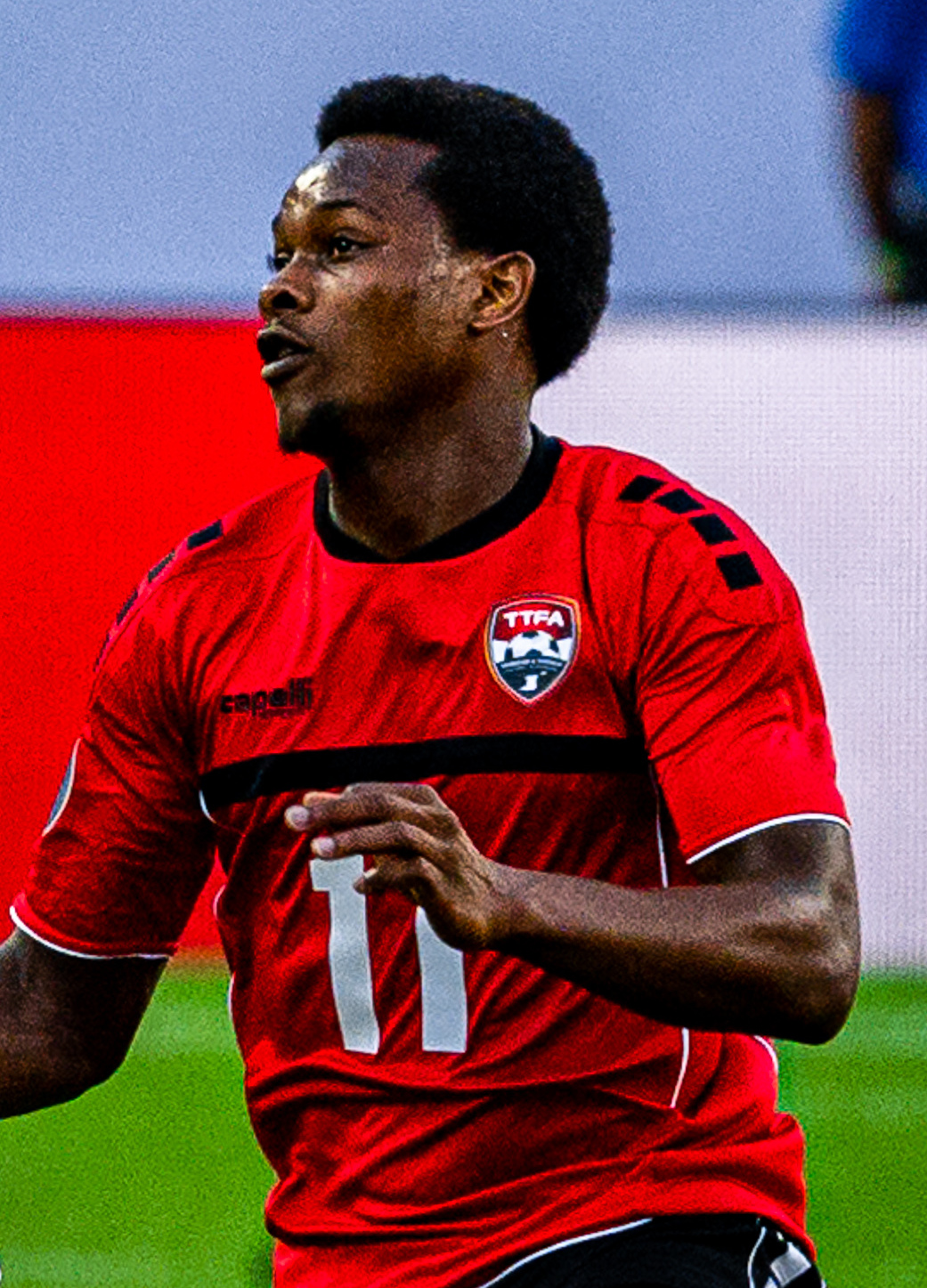
Levi García

- Levi García– AEK Athens, Panathinaikos – 2020–2025, 2026–

=== United States ===
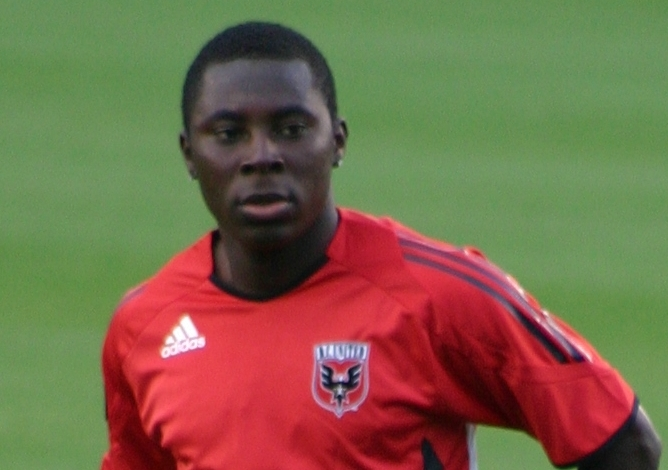
Freddy Adu

- Freddy Adu – Aris – 2010
- Gboly Ariyibi – Panetolikos – 2019–2021
- Andreas Chronis – AEK Athens – 2007
- Ted Chronopoulos – Panionios – 1993–1996
- Konrad de la Fuente – Olympiacos – 2022–2023
- Joseph Efford – PAS Giannina – 2023–2024
- Nicholas Gioacchini – Asteras Tripolis – 2025–2026
- Jonathan Gómez – PAOK – 2024–
- Eddie Johnson – Aris – 2010
- Gus Kartes – Olympiacos – 1997–2000
- Frank Klopas – AEK Athens – 1988–1994
- Jacques LaDouceur – Panionios – 1982–1984
- Clint Mathis – Ergotelis – 2008
- Erik Palmer-Brown – Panathinaikos – 2023–
- Peter Skouras – Olympiacos, PAOK, Diagoras – 1984–1985, 1986–1988
- Caleb Stanko – PAS Giannina, Asteras Tripolis, Lamia – 2022–2024

== Oceania (OFC) ==
=== New Zealand ===
- Kosta Barbarouses – Panathinaikos – 2012–2013
- Kris Bright – Panserraikos – 2009
- James McGarry – Athens Kallithea – 2025
- Marko Stamenić – Olympiacos – 2024–2025
- Themistoklis Tzimopoulos – Akratitos, PAS Giannina, Levadiakos – 2003–2004, 2005–2006, 2011–2019, 2022–2023

=== Tahiti (French Polynesia) ===
- Marama Vahirua – Panthrakikos – 2012–2013

== South America (CONMEBOL) ==
=== Argentina ===
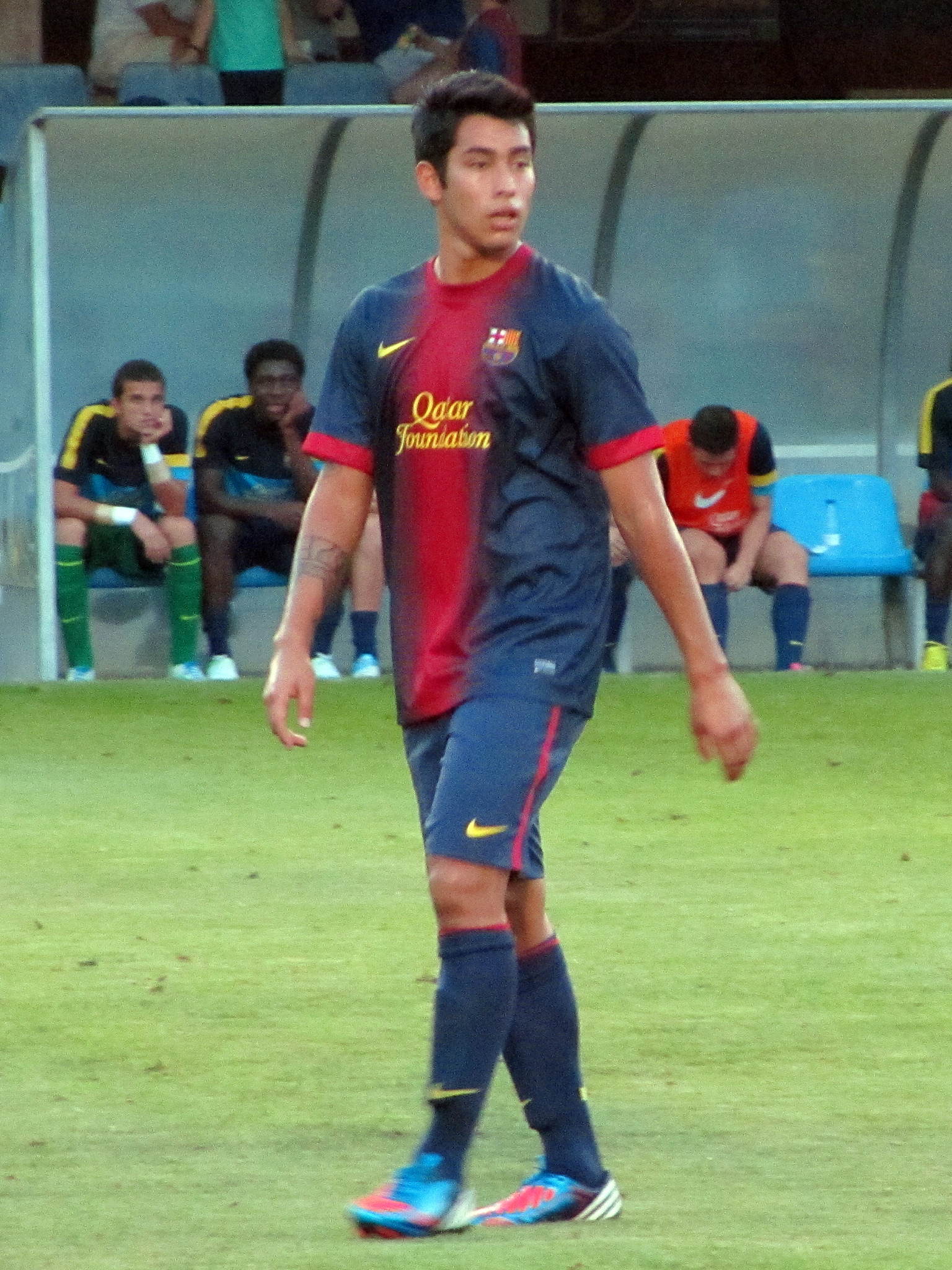
Sergio Araujo

A

- Lucas Acevedo – Atromitos – 2023–2024
- Joel Acosta – Apollon Smyrnis – 2018–2019
- Roberto Agueropolis – Panathinaikos, Rodos – 1980–1983
- Antonio Justo Alcibar – Olympiacos – 1972–1973
- Roque Alfaro – Panathinaikos – 1980–1981
- Fernando Alloco – Asteras Tripolis – 2015–2016
- Federico Álvarez – Asteras Tripolis – 2020–2025
- Juan Álvarez – Panetolikos – 2020–2021
- Leandro Álvarez – Olympiacos Volos, Asteras Tripolis, Apollon Smyrnis – 2010–2014
- Óscar Álvarez – PAS Giannina, Panathinaikos, Atromitos – 1974–1981
- Nicolás Andereggen – A.E. Kifisia – 2023–2024
- Santino Andino – Panathinaikos – 2026–
- Luca Andrada – AEL – 2025–2026
- Luis Andreuchi – Panathinaikos – 1980–1981
- Carlos Arano – Aris – 2009–2010
- Carlos Araujo – AEK Athens – 2009–2011
- Sergio Araujo – AEK Athens – 2017–2018, 2020, 2021–2024
- Nicolás Bianchi Arce – AEK Athens – 2009–2010
- Rodrigo Archubi – Olympiacos – 2007–2008
- Rodolfo Arruabarrena – AEK Athens – 2007–2008
- Joaquín Arzura – Panetolikos – 2020–2021
- Federico Azcárate – AEK Athens – 2007–2008
- Juan Pablo Avendaño – Skoda Xanthi – 2008–2009

B

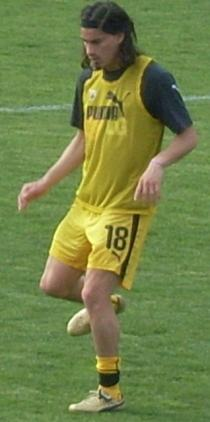
Ismael Blanco

- Luciano Balbi – Panetolikos – 2019
- Franco Baldassarra – Panetolikos – 2023–2024
- Gustavo Balvorín – Levadiakos – 2009–2010
- Guillermo Balzi – Levadiakos – 2024–
- Jerónimo Barrales – Asteras Tripolis, Lamia – 2013–2015, 2018–2023
- Marcos Barrera – AEL Kalloni – 2014–2015
- Juan Manuel Barrientos – Thrasyvoulos – 2008–2009
- Sebastián Bartolini – Asteras Tripolis, Iraklis, Apollon Athens – 2009–2014, 2015–2018
- Julián Bartolo – Volos, Asteras Tripolis – 2020–
- Adrián Bastía – Asteras Tripolis – 2008–2011
- Pablo Bastianini – Ionikos – 2007
- Roberto Battión – Aris, Veria – 2008–2010, 2014–2016
- Jonatan Bauman – Kerkyra – 2017–2018
- Juan Bauza – Levadiakos – 2026–
- Leandro Becerra – PAS Giannina – 2011–2012
- Franco Bellocq – Asteras Tripolis – 2018–2021
- Fernando Belluschi – Olympiacos – 2008–2009
- Fernando Martín Benitez – Ionikos – 2005―2006
- Oliver Benítez – Lamia – 2022–2023
- Facundo Bertoglio – Asteras Tripolis, Lamia, Aris, Volos – 2015–2016, 2018–2019, 2020–2024
- Julio Bevacqua – Panthrakikos – 2008–2009
- Mariano Bíttolo – Atromitos – 2015–2017
- Ismael Blanco – AEK Athens – 2007–2011
- Juan Carlos Blengio – Atromitos – 2009–2010
- Julián Bonetto – Kalamata – 2026–
- Fabián Bordagaray – Levadiakos – 2014–2015
- Juan José Borrelli – Panathinaikos, Akratitos – 1991–1996, 2002
- Lucas Boyé – AEK Athens – 2018–2019
- Federico Bravo – Panetolikos – 2017–2018
- Fabricio Brener – PAS Giannina – 2020–2022
- Marcelino Britapaja – Panathinaikos – 1975–1976
- Esteban Buján – PAS Giannina – 2009–2011
- Diego Buonanotte – AEK Athens – 2015–2016
- Luis Bustamante – Levadiakos – 2015
- Jonathan Bustos – AEL – 2019–2020

C

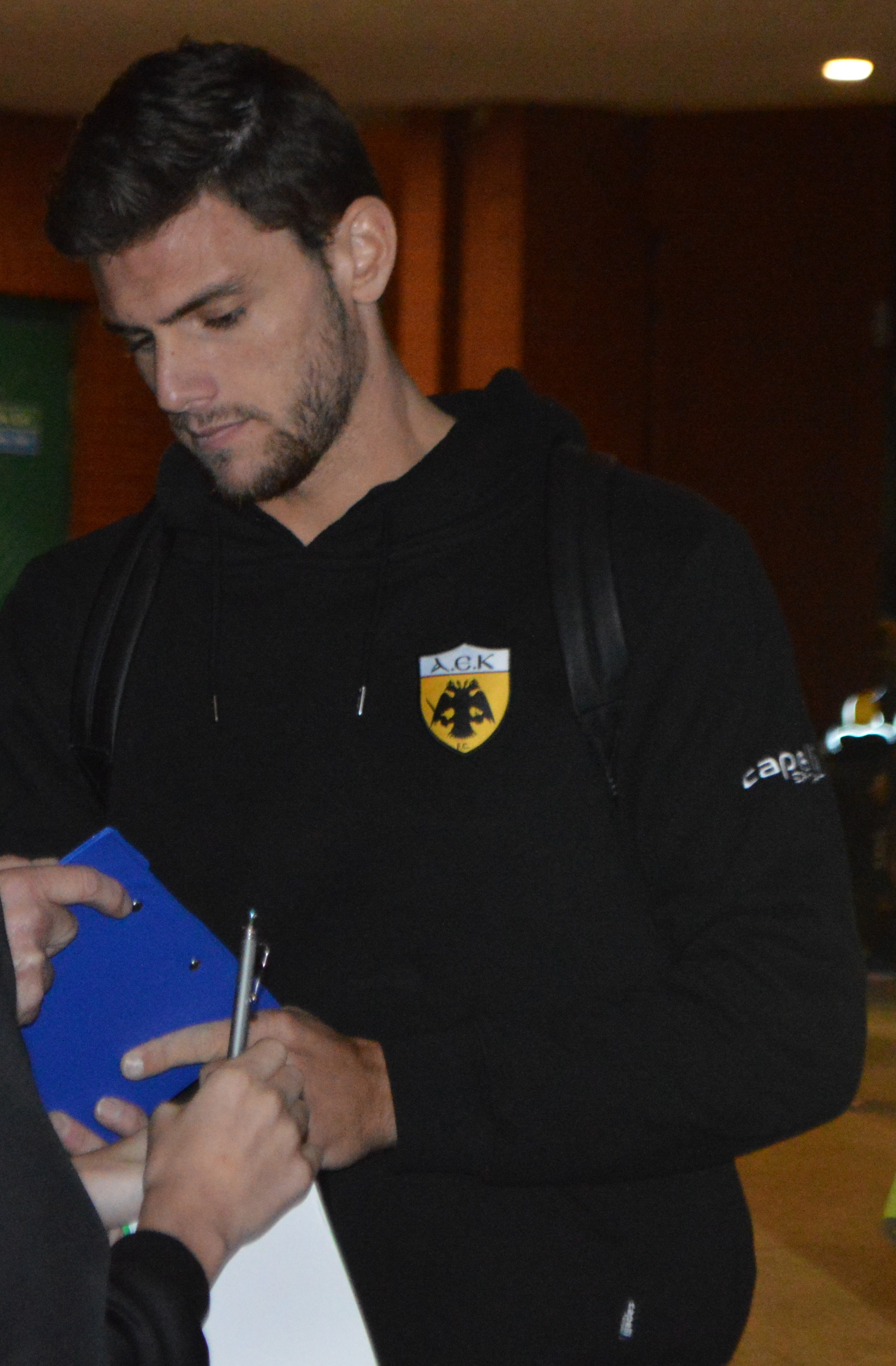
Lucas Boyé

- Juan Pablo Caffa – Asteras Tripolis – 2013–2014
- Luis Darío Calvo – AEK Athens, Kalamata – 2000, 2001
- Esteban Cambiasso – Olympiacos – 2015–2017
- Cláudio Campos – PAS Giannina – 2000–2001
- Patricio Camps – PAOK – 2000
- Pablo Cantero – AEK Athens – 1999–2000
- Javier Cámpora – Aris, Veria – 2009–2010, 2014–2015
- Gaston Caporale – OFI – 2008
- Mauricio Carrasco – Asteras Tripolis, Atromitos – 2013–2014, 2015
- Horacio Cardozo – Asteras Tripolis, Ergotelis, Kerkyra – 2007–2010, 2013–2015
- Sebastián Carrera – Asteras Tripolis – 2009–2011
- Gastón Casas – AEL – 2009–2010
- Carlos Casteglione – Panionios – 2009–2010
- Gonzalo Castillejos – Apollon Smyrnis – 2017–2018
- Facundo Pérez Castro – Olympiacos Volos – 2010–2011
- Fernando Eduardo Castro – Paniliakos – 1997
- Matías Castro – Xanthi – 2017–2019, 2020
- Juan Cataldi – Kalamata – 2026–
- Lucas Chaves – Panetolikos, Panathinaikos – 2024–
- Andrés Chávez – Panathinaikos, Lamia – 2017–2018, 2025
- Cristian Gabriel Chávez – PAS Giannina – 2013–2017
- Cristian Manuel Chávez – Asteras Tripolis – 2016–2017
- Julián Chicco – Asteras Tripolis – 2025–
- Nicolás Colazo – Aris – 2018–2019
- Israel Coll – Apollon Smyrnis – 2020–2021
- Rodrigo Colombo – Volos – 2020–2021
- Maximiliano Comba – Volos – 2023–
- Jorge Correa – Volos – 2022
- Franco Costanzo – Olympiacos – 2011–2012
- Héctor Cuevas – PAS Giannina – 2011–2012

D

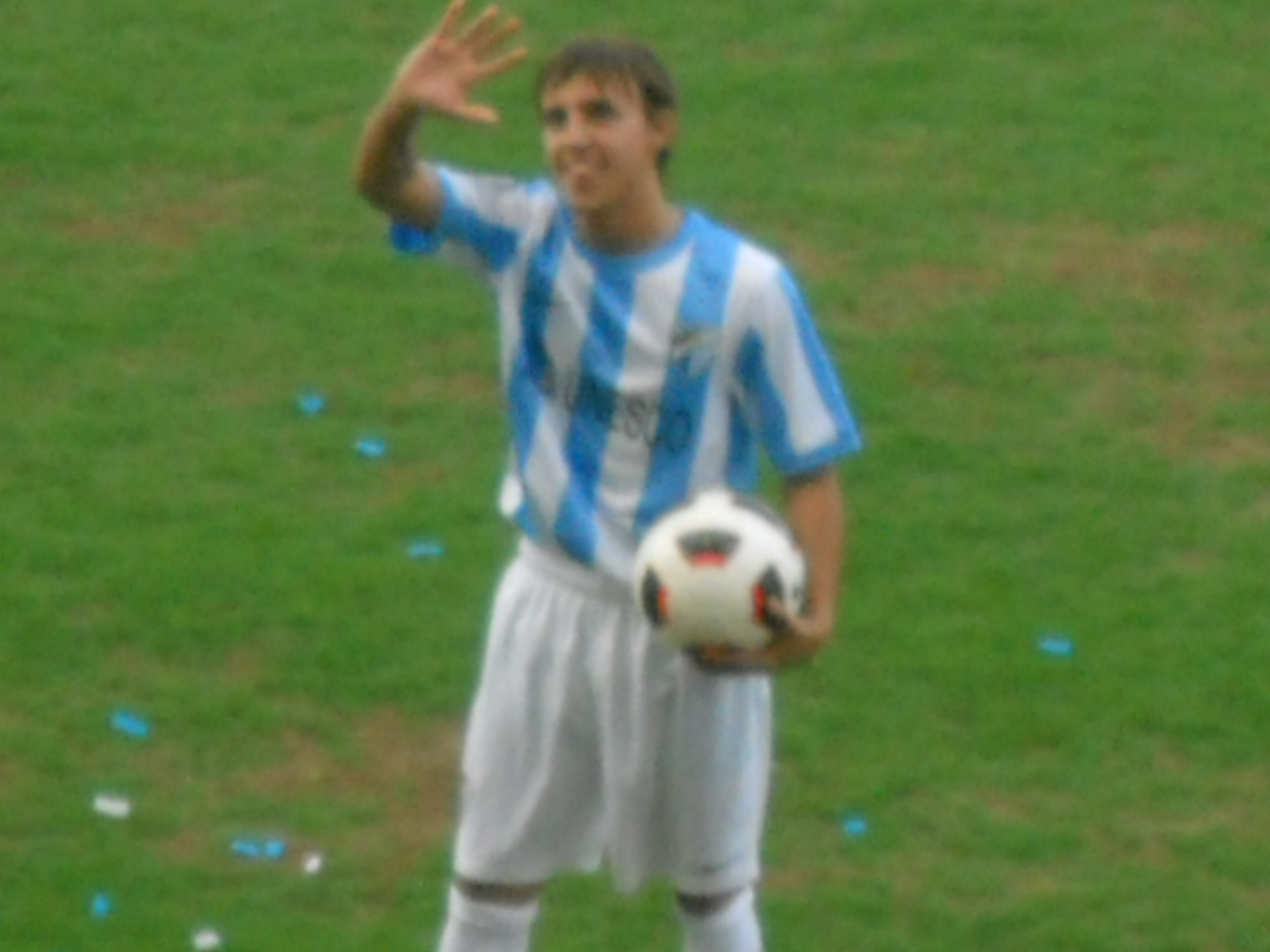
Diego Buonanotte

- Sebastian D'Ambra – Ionikos – 1994―1995
- Israel Damonte – Asteras Tripolis – 2008–2010
- Jesus Datolo – Olympiacos – 2010
- Pablo de Blasis – Asteras Tripolis – 2012–2014
- Lucas de Francesco – Akratitos – 2005–2006
- Tomas De Vincenti – PAS Giannina, Olympiacos, Lamia – 2009–2014, 2020–2023
- Matías Defederico – Apollon Smyrnis – 2018–2019
- Matías Omar Degra – Asteras Tripolis, AEL – 2009–2011, 2016
- Víctor Hugo Delgado – OFI, Panathinaikos – 1990–1993
- Alejandro Delorte – Aris – 2008–2009
- Daniel Dobrik – Skoda Xanthi – 2000–2001
- Christian Dollberg – PAOK – 2000–2001
- Alejandro Domínguez – Olympiacos – 2013–2017
- Bruno Duarte – Panetolikos – 2023–2024
- Aldo Duscher – Veria – 2013

E

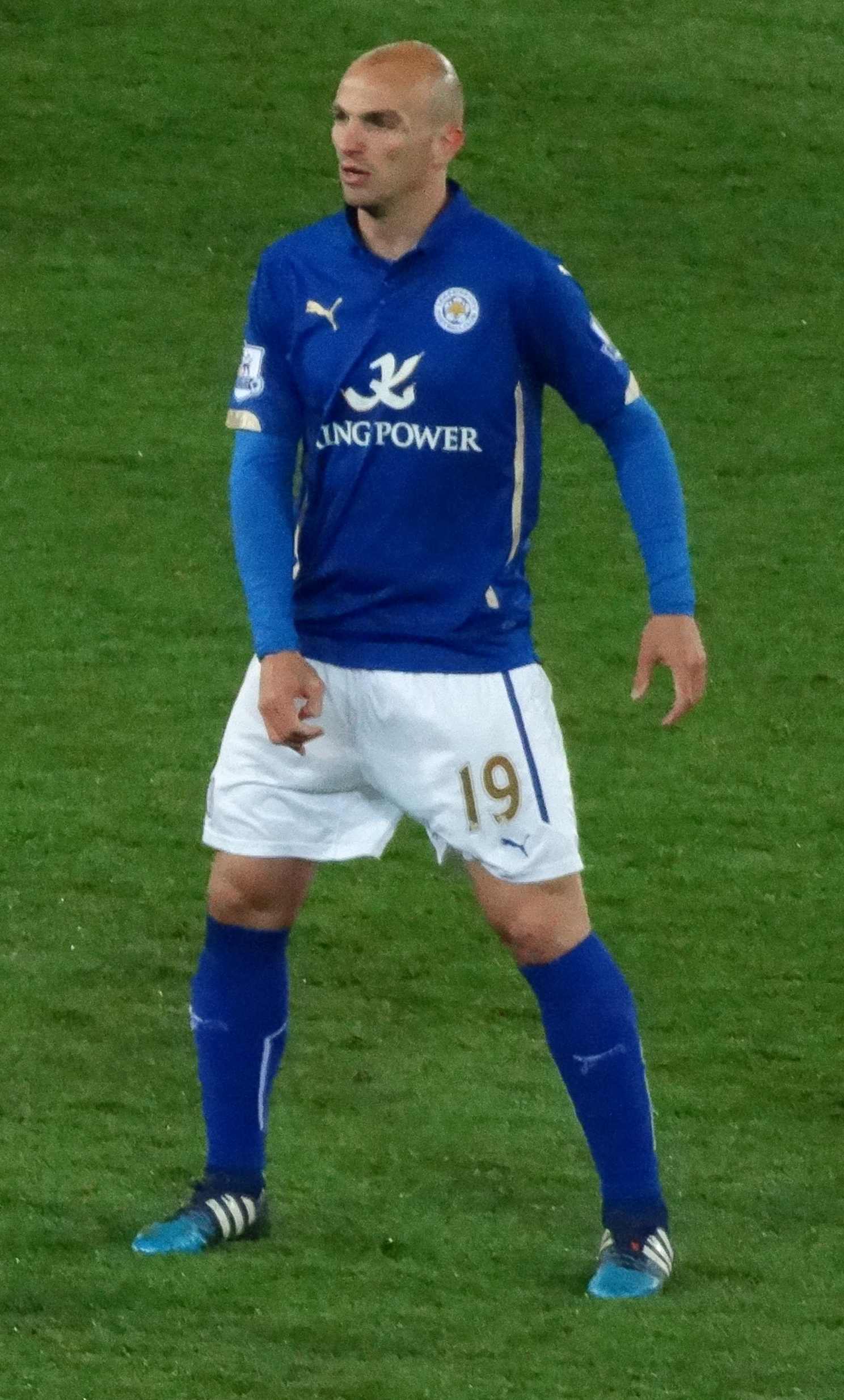
Esteban Cambiasso

- Emiliano Ellacopulos – AEL Kalloni – 2015–2016
- Sebastián Ereros – Asteras Tripolis – 2008–2009
- Rodrigo Erramuspe – PAS Giannina, Levadiakos – 2020–2025
- Néstor Errea – AEK Athens, Apollon Athens – 1972–1977
- Gastón Esmerado – Skoda Xanthi – 2007–2008
- Matías Esquivel – A.E. Kifisia – 2025

F

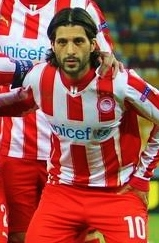
Alejandro Domínguez

- Iván Moreno y Fabianesi – Skoda Xanthi – 2008–2009
- Lucas Favalli – Apollon Kalamarias, Atromitos, Levadiakos, AEL Kalloni – 2006–2008, 2009–2012, 2015–2016
- Luis Fariña – Asteras Tripolis – 2016–2017
- Darío Fernández – Panionios, Aris – 2005–2008, 2009–2010
- Nico Fernández – Asteras Tripolis – 2014–2016
- Franco Ferrari – Volos, Aris – 2019–2022, 2023–2025
- Mauricio Ferrari – AEL – 2008–2009
- Osmar Ferreyra – Panetolikos – 2016
- Ignacio Fideleff – Ergotelis – 2014–2015
- Luciano Figueroa – Panathinaikos – 2013–2014
- Lucio Filomeno – Asteras Tripolis, PAOK – 2007–2011
- Lautaro Formica – Asteras Tripolis – 2011–2014
- Emmanuel Fernandes Francou – Asteras Tripolis – 2010–2012
- Paolo Frangipane – Olympiacos Volos – 2010
- Nicolás Freire – Olympiacos – 2023–2024
- Juan Gilberto Funes – Olympiacos – 1988–1989

G

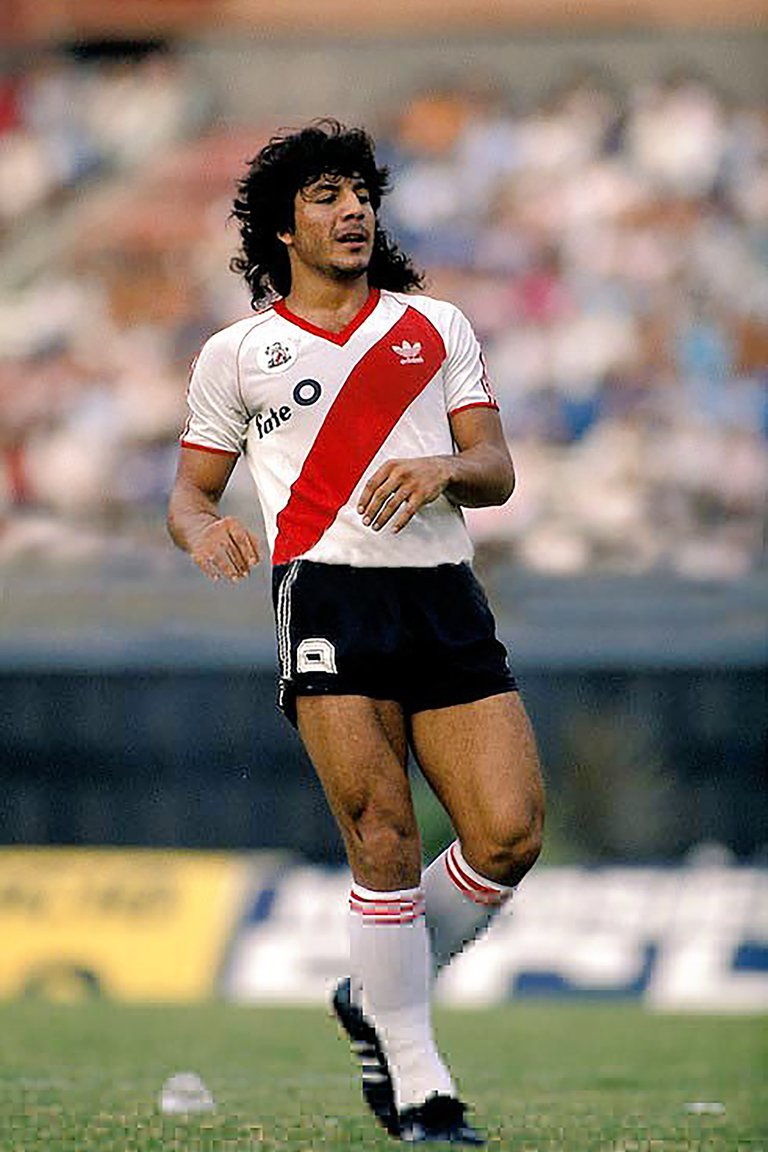
Juan Gilberto Funes

- Enzo Gaggi – Volos – 2023
- Fernando Galetto – Panathinaikos – 1999–2002
- Luciano Galletti – Olympiacos, OFI – 2007–2010, 2013
- Braian Galván – Panserraikos – 2025–2026
- Leandro Garate – AEL – 2025–2026
- Juan Manuel García – Volos, Panetolikos – 2023–2024, 2026
- Mateo García – Aris – 2018–2019, 2020–2023
- Pitu García – Iraklis, Aris, Atromitos, Volos, PAS Giannina – 2007–2016, 2018–2020
- Roberto Gargini – PAS Giannina – 1990–1991
- Juan Garro – PAS Giannina – 2023–2024
- Benjamín Garré – Aris – 2026–
- Alfredo Glasman – PAS Giannina – 1974–1982
- Fernando Godoy – Panetolikos, Atromitos – 2013–2016
- Rodrigo Gómez – Asteras Tripolis – 2020–2021
- Rubén Gómez – Levadiakos – 2014–2015
- Ezequiel González – Panathinaikos – 2004–2008
- Gastón González – Platanias – 2012–2013
- Matías González – Volos – 2026–
- Mariano Fernando González – OFI – 2005–2007
- Sergio González – Aris – 1987–1988
- Leandro Gracián – Aris – 2009
- Ariel Graña – Kalamata – 2001
- Sebastián Grazzini – Asteras Tripolis – 2013–2014
- Fausto Grillo – Volos – 2021–2022
- Marcelo Gutman – Ionikos – 2001–2007

H

- Guillermo Hernando – Ionikos – 2006–2007
- Esteban José Herrera – Iraklis, Veria, OFI – 2005–2009
- Santiago Hezze – Olympiacos – 2023–
- Ángel Hoyos – Atromitos, Panserraikos – 2007–2008, 2010–2011
- Michael Hoyos – OFI – 2013–2014

I

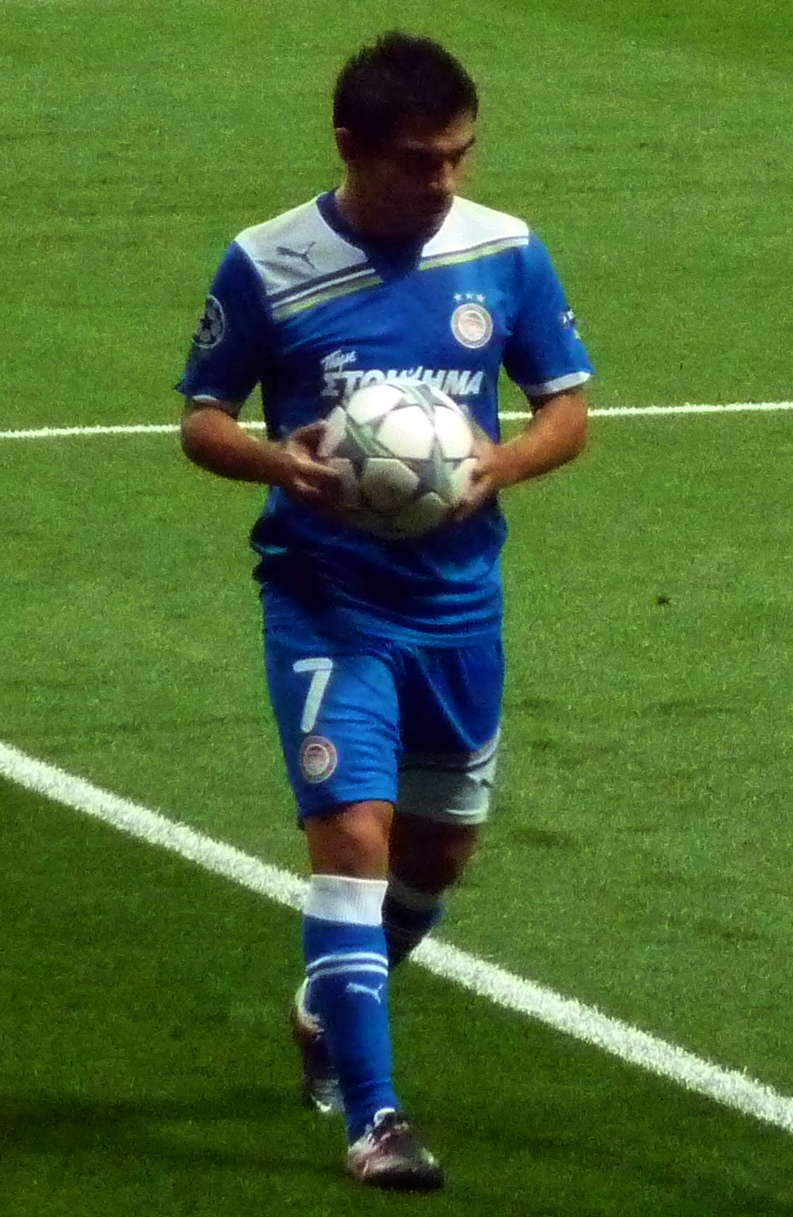
Ariel Ibagaza

- Ariel Ibagaza – Olympiacos, Panionios – 2010–2015
- Robert Ibáñez – Lamia – 2025
- Matías Iglesias – AEL, Atromitos, Asteras Tripolis – 2007–2014, 2015–2023
- Juan Manuel Insaurralde – PAOK – 2014
- Emanuel Insúa – Panathinaikos, AEK Athens – 2017–2021
- Eugenio Isnaldo – Asteras Tripolis – 2017–2018
- Kevin Itabel – Panetolikos – 2018

J

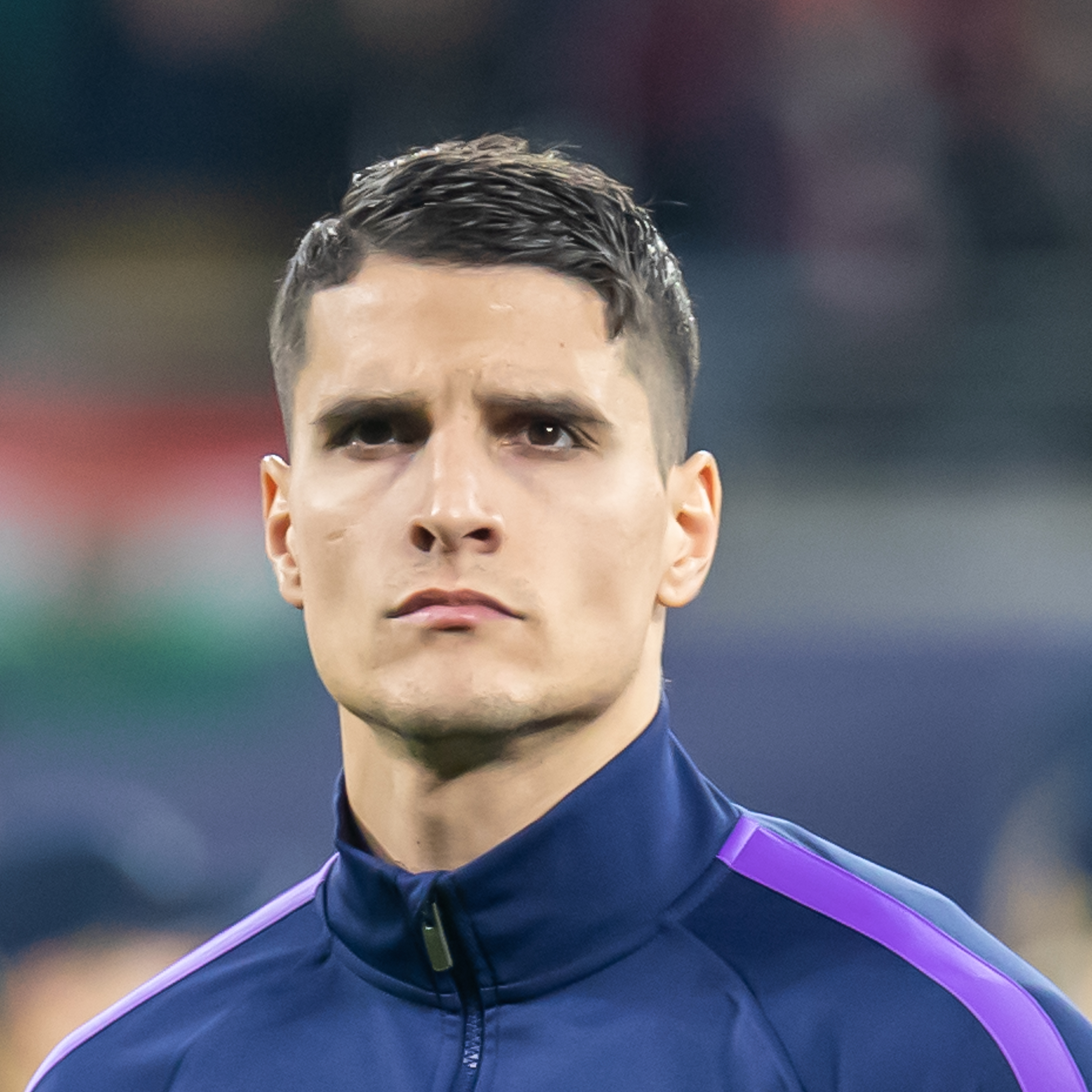
Erik Lamela

- Franco Jara – Olympiacos – 2015
- Fernando Joao – Volos – 2019–2020
- Axel Juárez – Apollon Smyrnis – 2017–2018

K

L

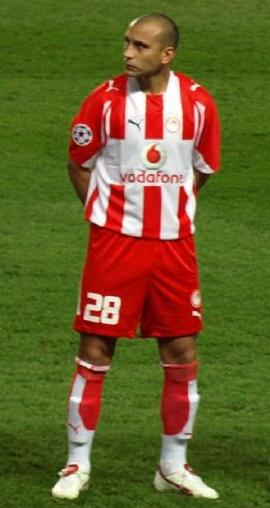
Cristian Ledesma

- Erik Lamela – AEK Athens – 2024–2025
- Cristian Ledesma – Olympiacos – 2007–2010
- Emmanuel Ledesma – Panetolikos – 2016
- Marcelo Ledesma – Ionikos – 1999―2001
- Matías Lequi – Iraklis – 2009–2010
- Sebastián Leto – Olympiacos, Panathinaikos – 2008―2013, 2016―2017
- Gabriel Lettieri – Ionikos – 2003―2007
- Braian Lluy – Asteras Tripolis, Panetolikos – 2013―2016, 2021―2022
- Sebastián Lomonaco – Panetolikos – 2024–2025
- Víctor David López – Panathinaikos – 2009
- Fernando Lorefice – Skoda Xanthi – 2008
- Maximiliano Lovera – Olympiacos, Ionikos – 2019―2024
- Adrián Lucero – Panthrakikos, Apollon Smyrnis, Xanthi, Panetolikos – 2012–2013, 2014–2020

M

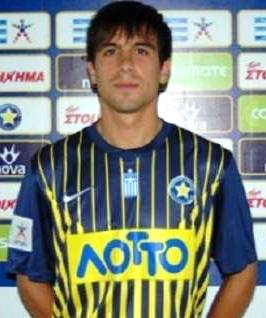
Juan Munafo

- Ramiro Macagno – Levadiakos – 2025–
- Luciano Maidana – A.E. Kifisia – 2025–2026
- Nicolás Maná – Panetolikos – 2018–2019
- Daniel Mancini – Aris, Panathinaikos – 2019–2026
- Martín Mandra – Paniliakos – 2000–2001
- Damián Manso – Skoda Xanthi – 2006–2007
- Javier Malagueño – Iraklis – 2007–2008
- Nicolás Marotta – Athens Kallithea – 2024–2025
- Juan Eduardo Martín – Olympiacos Volos, Kerkyra – 2010–2012
- Gaston Martina – Asteras Tripolis – 2007–2008
- David Martínez – Volos – 2025–
- Mariano Martínez – Aris – 2004–2005
- Nicolás Martínez – Panetolikos, Olympiacos, Aris, Volos, Apollon Smyrnis – 2014–2015, 2018–2022
- Federico Martorell – Thrasyvoulos, Levadiakos – 2008–2010
- Carlos Alberto Massara – Levadiakos, Asteras Tripolis, Atromitos – 2005–2008, 2009–2010
- Patricio Matricardi – Asteras Tripolis – 2018–2020
- Augusto Max – Volos – 2019–2020
- Franco Mazurek – Panetolikos – 2017–2019, 2020–2021
- Pablo Mazza – Asteras Tripolis – 2014–2017
- Nicolás Mazzola – Panetolikos – 2020–2021
- Miguel Mellado – OFI, Athens Kallithea – 2018–2024, 2025
- Hernán Medina – AEK Athens – 2001
- Júnior Mendieta – Volos, Asteras Tripolis – 2024–2026
- Javier Mendoza – Panetolikos, Ionikos – 2020–2022
- Jonathan Menéndez – Aris, A.E. Kifisia – 2023–2024
- Mariano Messera – Skoda Xanthi – 2006–2007
- Mauro Milano – Asteras Tripolis, Iraklis – 2007–2011
- Federico Milo – Ionikos – 2022–2013
- Dardo Miloc – Volos – 2021
- Juan Miritello – Asteras Tripolis – 2023–2024
- Vicente Monje – Olympiacos Volos, Olympiacos – 2009–2012
- Juan Montes – PAS Giannina – 1974–1982
- Eduardo Bustos Montoya – Levadiakos – 2007–2009
- Alejandro Mulet – Veria – 1999
- Juan Munafo – Panthrakikos, Platanias, Asteras Tripolis – 2009–2024
- Fabián Muñoz – Panetolikos – 2016–2017

N

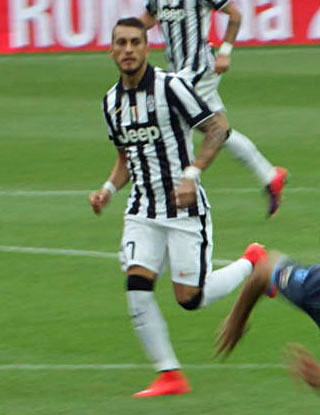
Roberto Pereyra

- Fernando Navas – AEK Athens, Aris, Panionios – 2000–2002, 2005
- Cristian Nasuti – Aris, AEK Athens – 2009–2011
- Sebastián Nayar – Kerkyra – 2014–2015
- Juan Neira – OFI – 2018–2026
- Miguel Alberto Nicolau – Olympiacos – 1972–1973
- Guillermo Nicosia – Iraklis – 1991–1992
- Leonel Núñez – Olympiacos, OFI – 2007–2008, 2014
- Thiago Nuss – OFI – 2024–

O

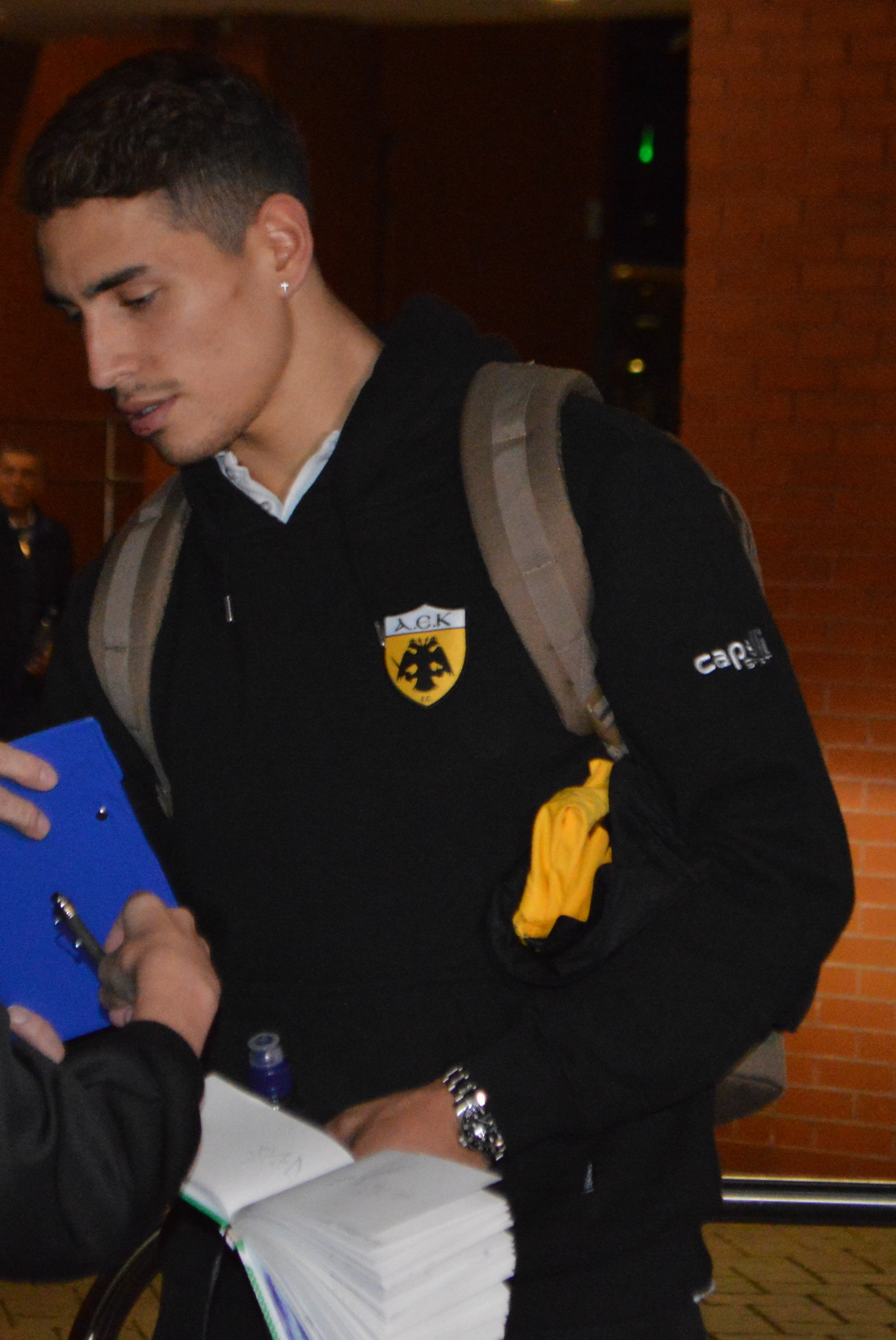
Ezequiel Ponce

- Matías Orihuela – Apollon Smyrnis – 2018–2019
- Brian Orosco – Asteras Tripolis – 2020–2021
- Nicolás Oroz – Volos – 2021–2022
- Francisco Ortega – Olympiacos – 2023–2026
- Ramón Antonio Ortíz – Skoda Xanthi – 2003–2004

P

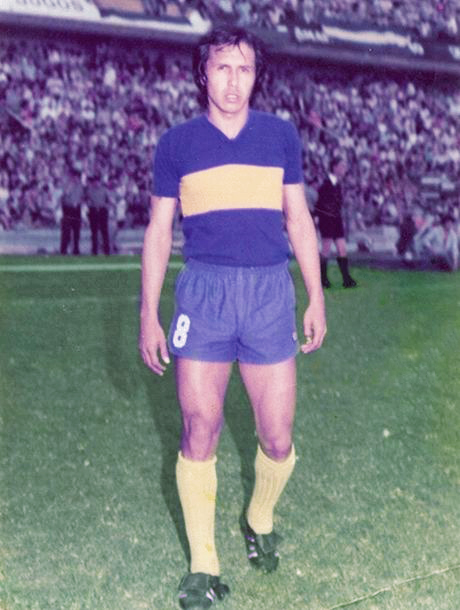
Juan Ramón Rocha

- Julián Palacios – Asteras Tripolis – 2024–
- Sebastián Palacios – Panathinaikos, Levadiakos, Aris – 2021–2024, 2025–
- Facundo Parra – AEL, Asteras Tripolis – 2007–2009, 2014–2015
- Martin Albano Pautasso – AEK Athens – 2006–2007
- Matías Pavoni – Asteras Tripolis – 2008
- Gonzalo Paz – Levadiakos – 2023
- Fabricio Pedrozo – Levadiakos – 2024–2026
- Agustín Pelletieri – AEK Athens – 2008–2009
- Sebastián Penco – Skoda Xanthi – 2008
- Elías Pereyra – Panetolikos – 2020–2022
- Facundo Pérez – Panetolikos, AEL – 2023–2026
- Paulo Pérez – Ionikos – 2003―2004
- Facundo Pereyra – PAOK – 2014–2017
- Roberto Pereyra – AEK Athens – 2024–2026
- Emanuel Perrone – Ionikos, Apollon Kalamarias, Atromitos, Asteras Tripolis, AEL Kalloni, Iraklis, AEL – 2005–2008, 2009–2014, 2015–2018
- Francisco Perruzzi – Panserraikos – 2024–2025
- Rubén Piaggio – Ionikos – 2000–2001
- Juan Martín Pietravallo – Veria – 2018
- Gonzalo Piñeiro – Kalamata – 2026–
- Cristian Pino – Panionios – 2004–2005
- Matías Pisano – Atromitos – 2021–2022
- Alberto José Poletti – Olympiacos – 1972–1973
- Ezequiel Ponce – AEK Athens – 2018–2019, 2023–2024
- Sergio Ponce – Panthrakikos, AEL – 2008–2009, 2011–2013
- Mauro Poy – Skoda Xanthi, Levadiakos, Panetolikos – 2007–2014
- Livio Prieto – AEK Athens – 2002–2003
- Emiliano Purita – Volos – 2021–2022

Q

- Diego Quintana – Skoda Xanthi – 2005–2011

R

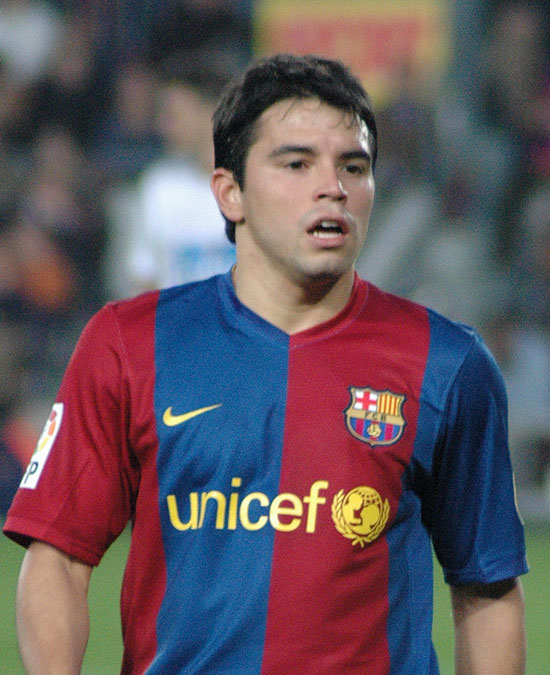
Javier Saviola

- Sebastián Rambert – Iraklis – 2001–2002
- Leonardo Ramos – Platanias – 2015–2016
- José Ramírez – Ionikos – 2007
- Germán Real – Ionikos – 2003–2004
- David Reano – Veria – 2013–2014
- Rodrigo Rey – PAOK – 2017–2021
- Lucas Rimoldi – Iraklis – 2010
- Lautaro Rinaldi – Panathinaikos – 2016–2017
- Leonel Ríos – Asteras Tripolis, Kavala – 2009–2011
- Emanuel Rivas – Iraklis – 2006–2007
- Germán Rivero – Apollon Smyrnis – 2019
- Javier Robles – Iraklis – 2011
- Juan Ramón Rocha – Panathinaikos – 1979–1989
- Jonathan Joel Rodríguez – PAS Giannina – 2017–2018
- Diego Matías Rodríguez – Panetolikos – 2021–2022
- Gabriel Rodríguez – Olympiacos Volos – 2010–2011
- Gregorio Rodríguez – Levadiakos – 2026–
- Patito Rodríguez – AEK Athens – 2016–2018
- Martín Rolle – Asteras Tripolis, Kerkyra – 2014–2015, 2017–2018
- Diego Romano – Ergotelis, Iraklis, Apollon Smyrnis – 2008–2017
- Thiago Romano – OFI – 2026–
- Emiliano Romero – Panetolikos – 2015–2016
- Sebastián Romero – Panathinaikos – 2006–2008
- Santiago Rosales – PAS Giannina – 2024
- Emanuel Ruiz – AEK Athens – 2000–2001
- Fermín Ruiz – Panetolikos – 2024–2025
- Sebastián Rusculleda – Panetolikos – 2015–2016

S

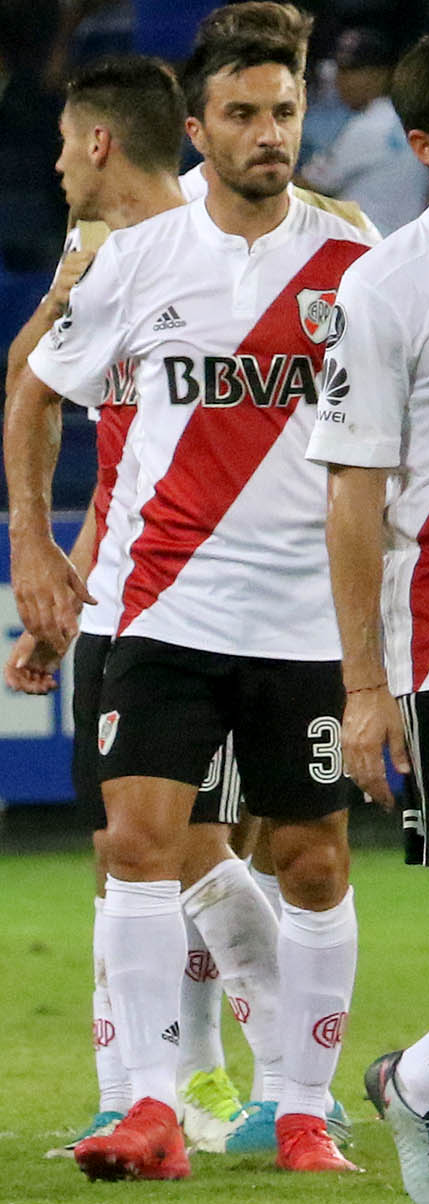
Ignacio Scocco

- Esteban Sacchetto – Ionikos – 2001–2002
- Sebastián Saja – AEK Athens – 2008–2011
- Lucas Salas – Asteras Tripolis – 2018–2019
- Alan Sánchez – Levadiakos – 2011–2012
- Facundo Sánchez – Panathinaikos – 2020–2023
- Matías Sánchez – Levadiakos – 2014–2015
- Salvador Sánchez – Volos, Ionikos, Lamia – 2020–2022, 2025
- Fernando Sanjurjo – Aris – 2004–2005
- Brian Sarmiento – Volos – 2019
- Marcelo Sarmiento – AEL, Atromitos – 2007–2012
- Javier Saviola – Olympiacos – 2013–2014
- Gabriel Schürrer – Olympiacos – 2004–2006
- Lorenzo Scipioni – Olympiacos – 2025–
- Ignacio Scocco – AEK Athens – 2008–2011
- Sebastián Setti – Asteras Tripolis, Apollon Smyrnis – 2013–2014, 2015–2016
- Fabricio Simone – Ionikos – 2003–2004
- Esteban Solari – Skoda Xanthi, Ergotelis – 2013–2014, 2015
- Franco Soldano – Olympiacos – 2019
- Nazareno Solís – OFI – 2021–2022
- Facundo Soloa – A.E. Kifisia – 2024
- Elián Sosa – AEK Athens – 2025–
- Juan Sánchez Sotelo – Levadiakos – 2014–2015
- Marcelo Sozzani – Skoda Xanthi – 1997

T

- Vicente Taborda – Panathinaikos – 2025–
- Martín Tonso – Asteras Tripolis, Aris, Atromitos – 2016–2020
- Pedro Silva Torrejón – Panetolikos – 2023–2025
- Joaquín Torres – Volos – 2019–2020
- Lucas Trejo – Atromitos – 2007–2011

U

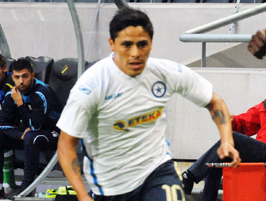
Javier Umbides

- Javier Umbides – Olympiacos Volos, Aris, Atromitos – 2009–2012, 2013–2021
- Bruno Urribarri – Asteras Tripolis – 2008–2011

V

- Guillermo Valdez – Ionikos – 2003―2004
- Ivan Valian – Kalamata, Apollon Athens, Kavala – 1974–1980
- Ricardo Verón – PAOK, OFI – 2008–2014
- Rodolfo Vicente – AEK Athens – 1972–1973
- Santiago Villafañe – Panthrakikos – 2015
- Lucas Villafáñez – Panetolikos, Panathinaikos, Volos, A.E. Kifisia – 2014–2018, 2020–2022, 2024, 2025–2026
- Leonardo Villalba – Panionios, Lamia – 2015–2016, 2020
- Pablo Vitti – Veria – 2016

W

- Lucas Daniel Wilchez – Asteras Tripolis – 2009–2010

X

Y

- Maria Luis Yordan – Skoda Xanthi – 2001

Z

- Luciano Zavagno – Ionikos – 2006–2007
- Hugo Horacio Zerr – AEK Athens – 1972–1973
- Bruno Zuculini – AEK Athens – 2016

=== Bolivia ===
- Danny Bejarano – Panetolikos Lamia – 2015–2018, 2019–2023
- Diego Bejarano – Panetolikos – 2014–2016
- Milton Coimbra – Ionikos – 2005
- Jeyson Chura – Panetolikos – 2025–
- Ronald García – Aris – 2005–2012
- Adrián Jusino – AEL – 2021

=== Brazil ===
A

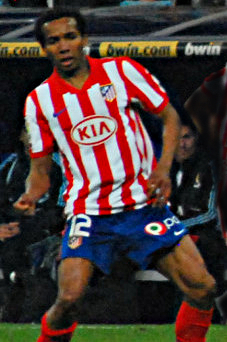
Paulo Assunção

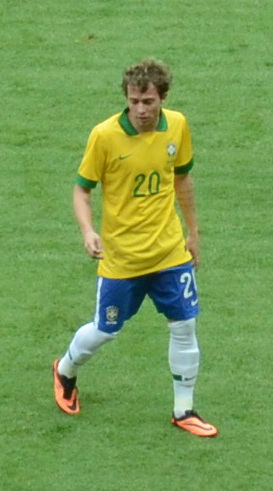
Bernard

- Adrianinho – OFI – 2005
- Aílton – Apollon Kalamarias – 2006
- Alan – Ergotelis – 2014–2015
- Carlos Alberto – Kerkyra – 2004–2005
- Alef – AEK Athens – 2018–2019
- Eduardo Alemão – Iraklis – 2005–2006
- Allan – PAOK – 2007
- Almir – Levadiakos – 2012–2013
- André Alves – Panetolikos – 2014–2015
- Márcio Amoroso – Aris – 2007–2008
- Lucas Anacker – Levadiakos – 2024–
- Léo Andrade – Lamia – 2024–2025
- Paulo Andrioli – Ionikos, Aris – 1996–2000
- Marcos António – PAOK – 2008–2009
- Marcos Antônio – PAOK – 2023–2024
- Paulo Assunção – AEK Athens, Levadiakos – 2004–2005, 2014
- Willian Arão – Panathinaikos – 2023–2025
- Arghus – Panetolikos – 2018–2019
- Douglas Augusto – PAOK – 2019–2023
- Aurélio – Kalamata – 1997–1998
- Marco Aurélio – Aris, Panserraikos – 2007–2009
- Márcio Azevedo – PAOK – 2018

B

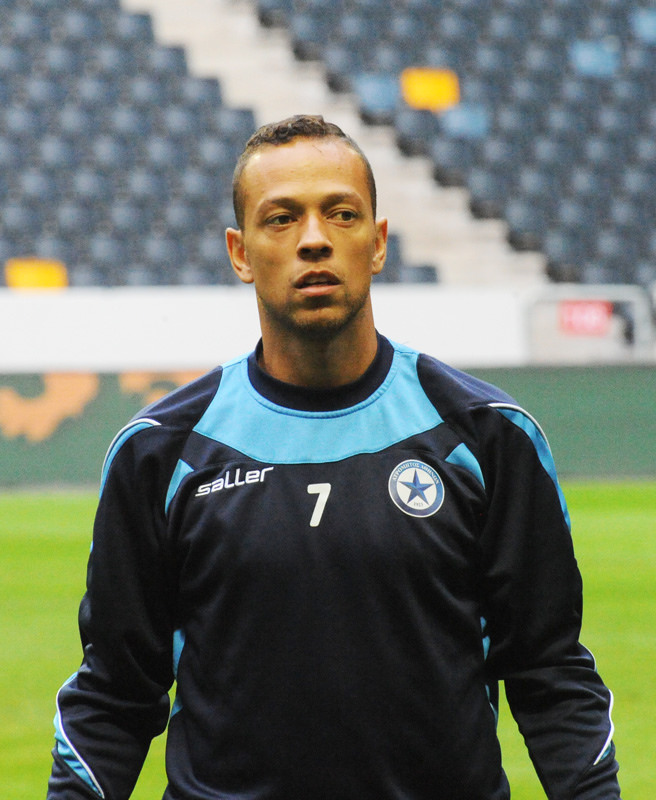
Luiz Brito

- Baiano – PAOK – 2007–2008
- Chiquinho Baiano – Skoda Xanthi – 2005–2006
- Marcos Bambam – Ergotelis – 2013–2015
- Gabriel Barbosa – Levadiakos – 2022–2023
- Matheus Barbosa – A.E. Kifisia – 2023
- Wellington Baroni – Panionios – 2009–2011
- William Bartolomeu – Proodeftiki – 1998–1999
- Rogério Belém – Aris – 2006–2007
- Bernard – Panathinaikos – 2022–2024
- Beto – Ergotelis – 2009–2012
- Everton Bezerra – Veria – 2012–2013
- Miguel Bianconi – Lamia – 2020
- Bica – Paniliakos – 1997–1998
- Binho – Iraklis – 2007–2008
- Bira – Trikala, Paniliakos – 1999–2002
- Luiz Felipe Bonetti – Ionikos – 2020–2021
- Ricardo Bóvio – Panathinaikos – 2006–2007
- Rafael Bracali – Panetolikos – 2013–2015
- Brandão – Levadiakos – 2017
- David Braz – Panathinaikos – 2009–2010
- Bressan – OFI – 2024–2025
- Luiz Brito – Apollon Kalamarias, Atromitos – 2004–2005, 2007–2008, 2009–2017
- Bruno – Atromitos, Olympiacos, Aris – 2018–2021
- Bujica – Veria – 1998

C

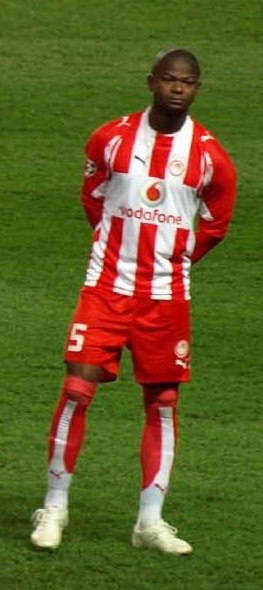
Júlio César

- Cacá – Aris – 2007
- Elton Calé – Ergotelis – 2015–2016
- Calil – Panionios – 2003–2004
- Carlau – Skoda Xanthi – 1990–1992
- Jean Carioca – Skoda Xanthi – 2011
- Carlinhos – Iraklis – 2010–2011
- Jean Carlos – Asteras Tripolis – 2007–2010
- Eliomar Carvalho – Panathinaikos, OFI – 1995–1997
- Cássio – Platanias – 2015
- Sandro Castro – Ethnikos Piraeus – 1998–1999
- Alex Cazumba – Skoda Xanthi – 2012–2013
- Júlio César – Panathinaikos – 1999
- Júlio César – Olympiacos – 2006–2008
- Júlio César – AEK Athens – 2005–2008
- Chumbinho – Olympiacos, Panserraikos, OFI, Levadiakos, Atromitos – 2010–2013, 2015–2019
- Claudinho – Aris – 1988–1989
- Clayton – Olympiacos – 2026–
- Clayton – Skoda Xanthi – 1999–2000
- Cléber – Kallithea – 2006–2007
- Cleyton – Apollon Kalamarias, AEL, Panathinaikos, Skoda Xanthi – 2004–2012, 2014–2015
- Flávio Conceição – Panathinaikos – 2005–2006
- Maurício Copertino – Panachaiki – 1999–2001
- José Luiz Lopes Cordeiro – Proodeftiki – 1997–1998
- Rogério Corrêa – Levadiakos – 2005–2006
- Anderson Costa – Aris – 2007
- Diego Costa – PAOK – 2026–
- Ricardo Costa – Veria – 2008
- Cris – Panionios – 2001–2002
- Cristiano – Atromitos – 2006–2007
- Cristiano – PAOK – 2009–2011
- Christopher – Skoda Xanthi – 2015–2016

D

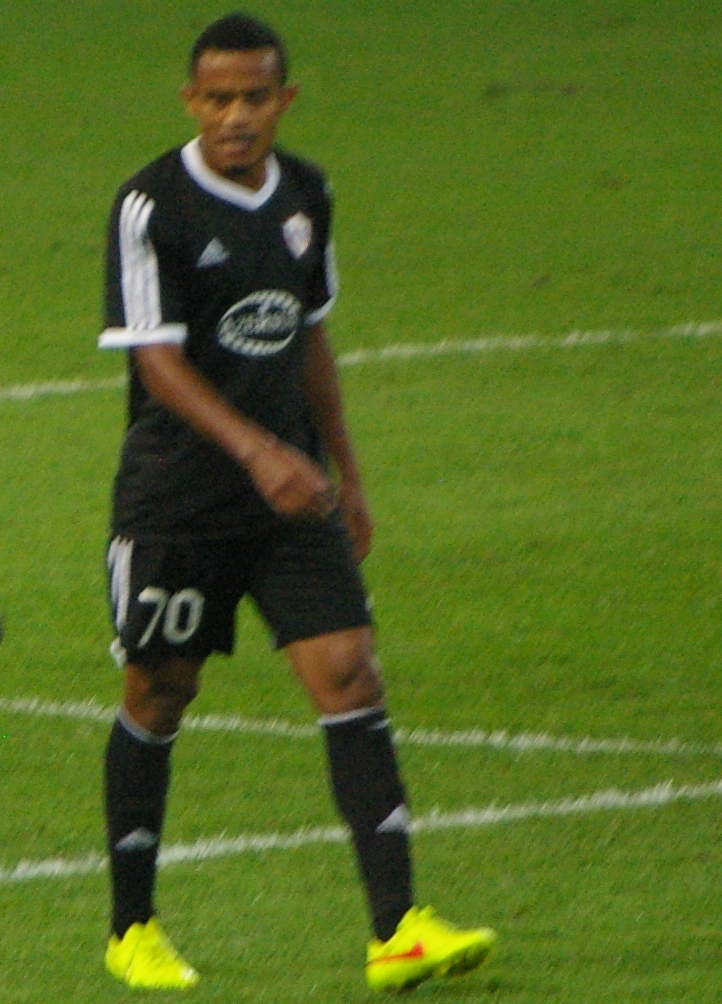
Chumbinho

- Alexandre D'Acol – Olympiacos, Kerkyra, Panionios – 2004–2009
- Paulo da Silva – AEL, Ionikos – 1990–1996
- Mauricio Andre Damião – Kavala – 1994–1995
- Luiz Carlos Dacroce – Kalamata – 1997–1998, 1999–2000
- William de Amorim – Xanthi – 2019–2020
- Paulo Batista de Freitas – Skoda Xanthi – 2004
- Araquem de Melo – Panathinaikos, Atromitos – 1972–1975
- Delson – AEL – 2009–2010
- Dema – Skoda Xanthi – 2005–2007
- Demethryus – Athens Kallithea – 2024–2025
- Denílson – Kavala – 2010
- Denis – Aris – 2021–2022
- Flávio Dias – Iraklis – 2008
- Diogenes – Proodeftiki – 1997–1998
- Diogo – Olympiacos – 2008–2013
- Gabriel do Carmo – Asteras Tripolis – 2012–2013
- Dodô – AEL – 2016–2017
- Luiz Domingues – Panionios, Apollon Smyrnis – 2018–2022
- Dorival – Skoda Xanthi – 2008–2009
- Antonio Glauco dos Santos – Ionikos – 1999–2000
- Marcos dos Santos – AEL Kalloni – 2013–2014
- Douglão – Kavala – 2009–2011
- Edu Dracena – Olympiacos – 2002–2003
- Duda – Kastoria – 1996–1997
- Dudu – Olympiacos, OFI – 2008–2011, 2013–2014
- Dudu – Aris – 2025–

E

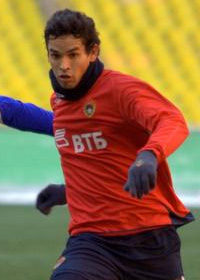
Dudu Cearense

- Éder – Asteras Tripolis, AEK Athens – 2009–2011
- Ederson – Asteras Tripolis – 2014–2016
- Edimar – Skoda Xanthi – 2011–2012
- Edinho – Aris – 1997
- Edinho – Iraklis – 2008
- Eduardo – Xanthi – 2019–2020
- Edvaldo – Olympiacos – 1989–1990
- Élder – PAS Giannina, Kallithea – 2000–2001, 2003
- Emerson – Skoda Xanthi, AEK Athens – 2005–2007
- Emerson – Iraklis – 2007
- Esquerdinha – Platanias – 2014–2016
- Etto – PAOK – 2011–2013
- Lucas Evangelista – Panathinaikos – 2016

F

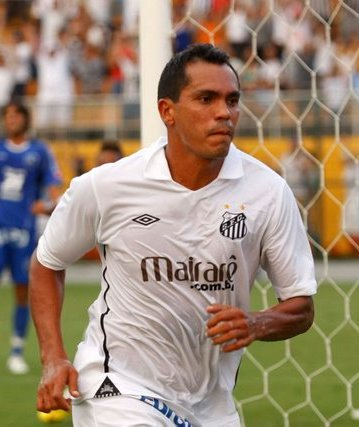
Giovanni

- Fabiano – Aris – 2010–2011
- Fabiano – Aris – 2021–
- Fabinho – Ionikos – 2006–2007
- Denys Luctke Facincani – Iraklis – 1990–1991
- João Favaro – Levadiakos – 2017–2019
- Luís Fernando – PAOK – 1988–1989
- Rodrigo Ferrugem – AEK Athens – 2000–2002
- Elton Figueiredo – Skoda Xanthi – 2015–2016
- João Figueiredo – OFI – 2019–2020
- Fillip – Kerkyra – 2004–2005, 2006–2007
- Flávio – Asteras Tripolis, Aris, AEL – 2007–2010
- Flavinho – Kerkyra – 2006–2007, 2010–2011
- Léo Flores – Paniliakos – 2004
- Ederson Fofonka – Iraklis, Kerkyra – 2000–2006
- Bruno Fogaça – Skoda Xanthi – 2006–2007
- Formiga – Chalkidona – 2004–2005
- Luciano Fonseca – Iraklis – 2008
- Gustavo Furtado – Lamia – 2024–2025

G

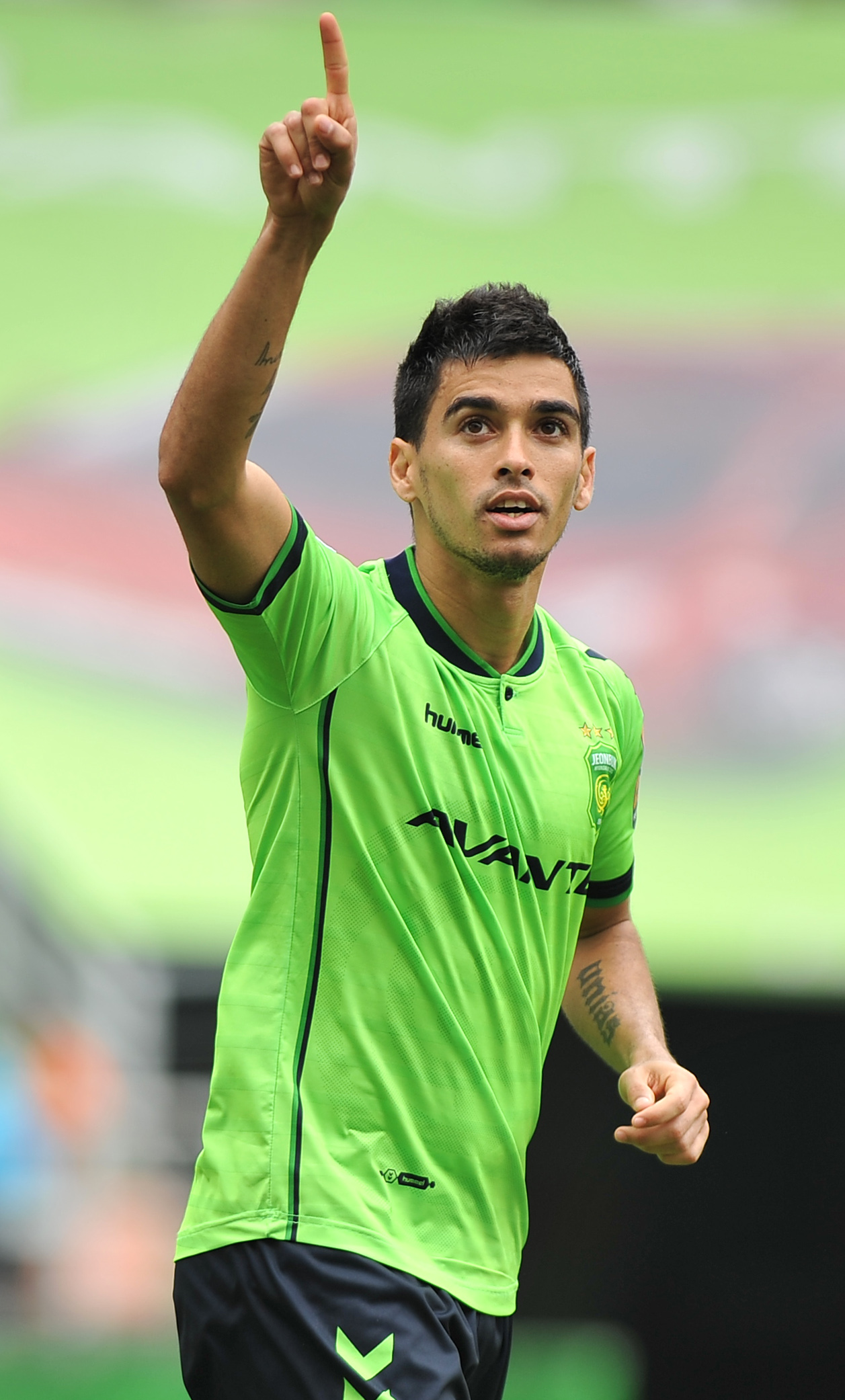
Leonardo

- Gabriel – Panathinaikos – 2008–2010
- Rodrigo Galo – Panetolikos, AEK Athens, Atromitos – 2013–2014, 2015–2021
- Lucas Galvão – Atromitos – 2020–2022
- Gelson – Veria – 2008
- Thiago Gentil – Aris – 2008–2009
- Tommy Giacomelli – Apollon Kalamarias – 2004–2005
- Gilvan – Veria – 2007–2008
- Márcio Giovanini – Veria – 2008–2009
- Giovanni – Olympiacos – 1999–2005
- Giuliano – Panionios – 2003–2004
- Gláuber – Akratitos – 2002–2003
- Felipe Gomes – Apollon Smyrnis – 2013–2014
- Anderson Gonzaga – Panionios – 2008–2009
- Marcelo Goianira – Panthrakikos, Asteras Tripolis, AEL Kalloni – 2011–2015
- Danilo Goiano – Levadiakos – 2005–2006
- Wellington Gonçalves – Apollon Kalamarias, Thrasyvoulos, Doxa Drama – 2004–2009, 2011–2012
- Neto Guerino – PAOK, Apollon Kalamarias – 1974–1986
- Guga – AEL – 2006–2007
- Ronaldo Guiaro – Aris – 2007–2011
- Guilherme – Olympiacos – 2018–2020
- Gustavinho – Akratitos, Kerkyra – 2005–2007, 2010–2012

H

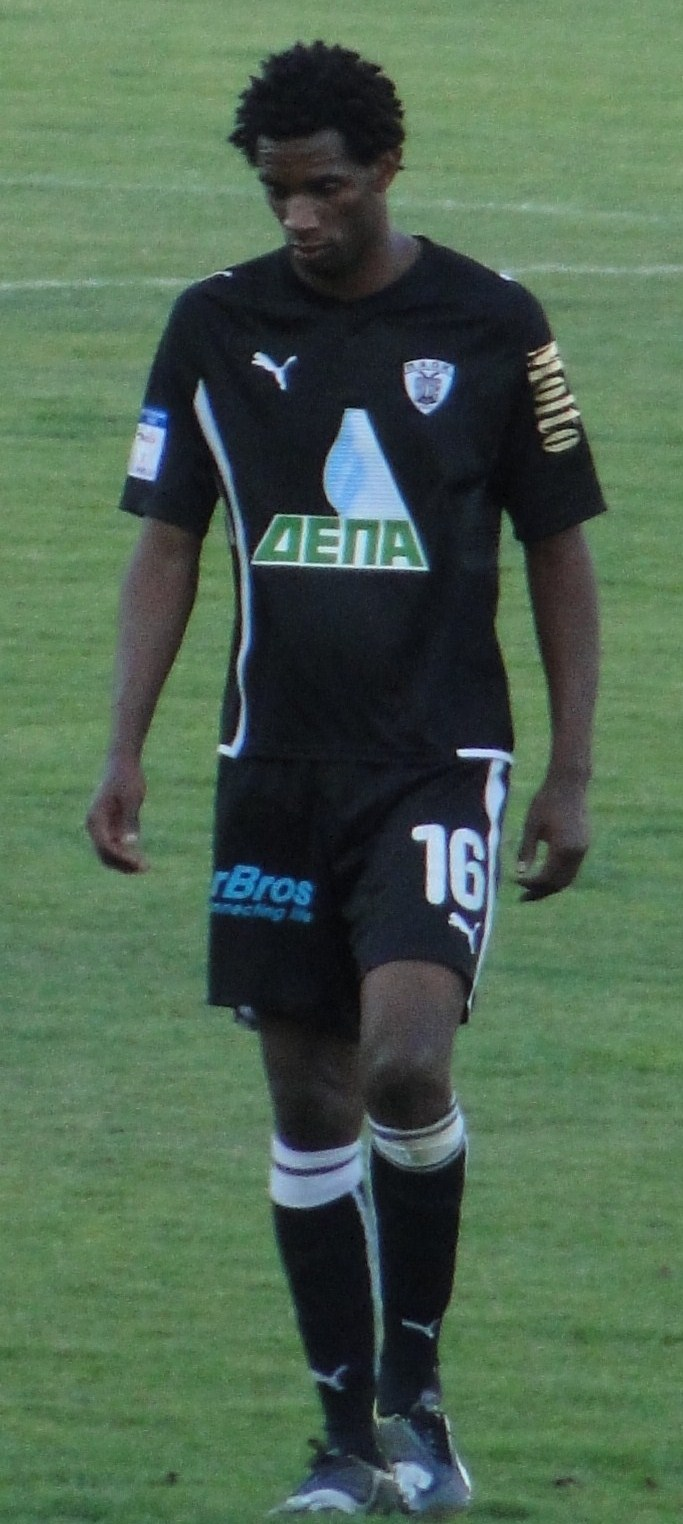
Lino

- Hegon – Asteras Tripolis, Apollon Smyrnis – 2011–2014
- Pedro Henrique – PAOK – 2016–2019
- Herivelto – Ionikos – 2003
- Hilton – Kalamata – 1999–2001
- Huanderson – Iraklis, Apollon Smyrnis – 2015–2019
- Vitor Hugo – Panathinaikos – 2024

I

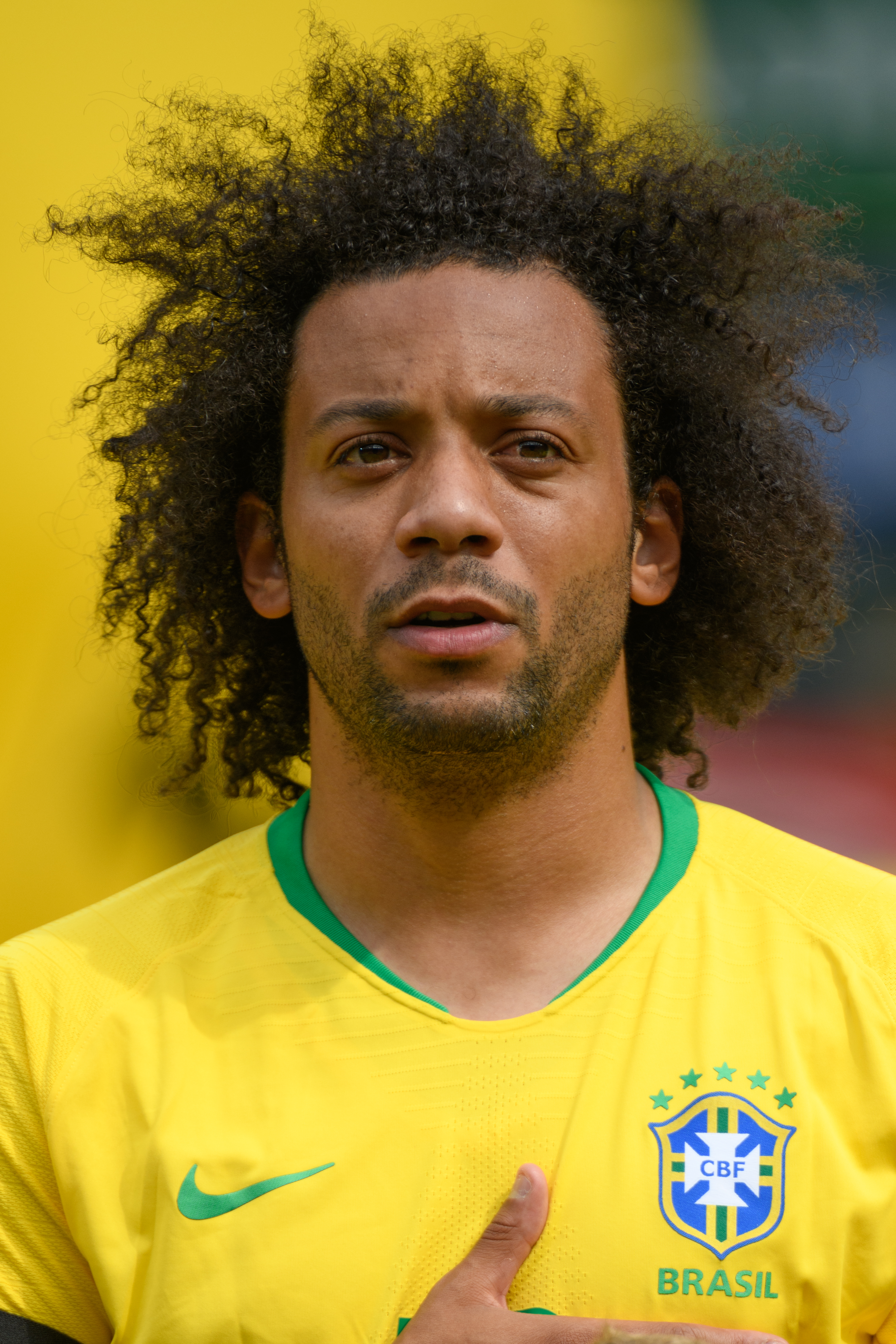
Marcelo

- Igor – Panthrakikos – 2013–2016
- Índio – PAOK – 2006–2007
- Marcel Issa – AEL – 1992–1994
- Ivan – Aris – 1992–1996

J

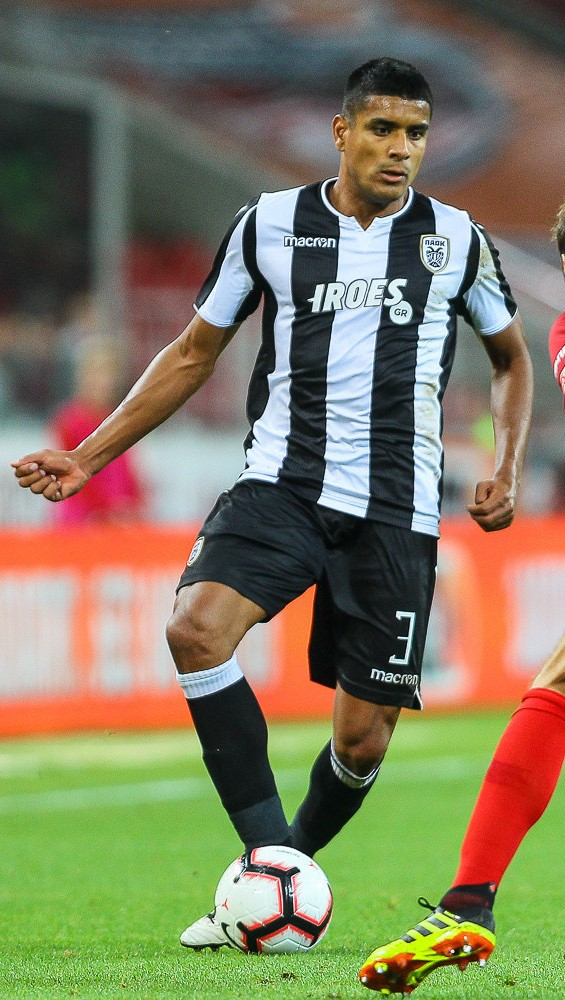
Léo Matos

- Léo Jabá – PAOK – 2018–2020
- Jairo – PAOK, PAS Giannina – 2015–2017
- Leonardo Jesus – Olympiacos, PAOK – 2008–2010, 2011–2012
- Ricardo Jesus – AEL – 2010
- Jocimar – Ionikos – 2002
- Julinho – Veria – 2007–2008
- Júnior – Ergotelis, Panetolikos – 2006–2014
- Giuseppe Vela Júnior – Apollon Kalamarias, AEL, Veria – 2004–2008
- Rubens Júnior – Edessaikos – 1996–1997

K

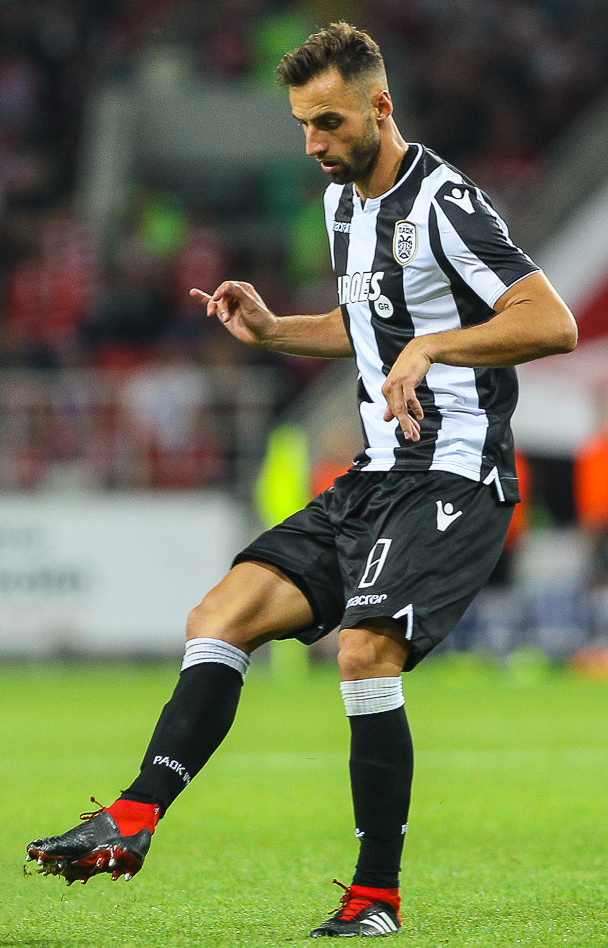
Maurício

- King – Ionikos – 2002–2006
- Kléber – Skoda Xanthi – 2005–2006
- Paulinho Kobayashi – Ionikos, Panachaiki – 1998–2002

L

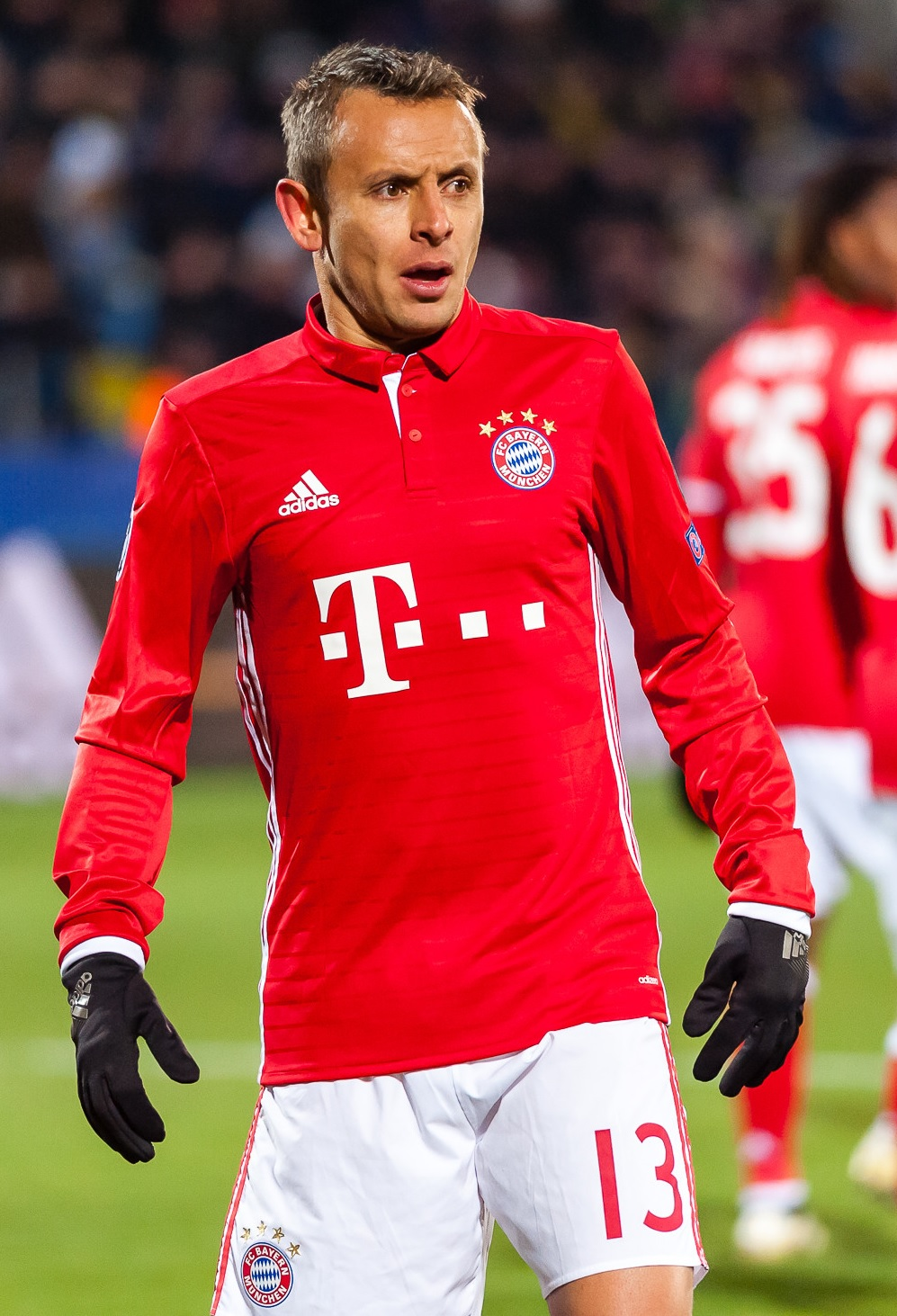
Rafinha

- Marcelo Labarthe – Platanias – 2013
- Lê – Atromitos – 2008
- Leandro – Olympiacos, Doxa Drama, AEL Kalloni, PAS Giannina – 2011–2014
- Alex Leandro – Iraklis – 2007
- Bruno Leite – Iraklis – 2008
- Leonardo – Levadiakos – 2017–2019
- Leonardo – Levadiakos, AEK Athens – 2007–2012
- Leozinho – Olympiacos, OFI, Panserraikos, AEL Kalloni, Iraklis, AEL – 2007–2008, 2010–2011, 2013–2015, 2016–2019
- Anderson Lima – Chalkidona, Panathinaikos, Atromitos – 2003–2007
- Dudu Lima – Asteras Tripolis – 2015–2018
- Lino – PAOK – 2009–2014
- Lenny Lobato – Panetolikos – 2026–
- Diego Lopes – Panetolikos – 2017–2018
- Luan – Ionikos – 2021–2022
- Lucão – Lamia – 2022
- Lucão – OFI – 2024
- Luciano – Olympiacos, Skoda Xanthi, PAOK, Panionios, Atromitos – 1995–2002, 2004–2008, 2009–2010
- Luciano – Panathinaikos – 2017–2018
- Geraldo Rosa Lucindo – Kalamata – 2000
- André Luiz – Olympiacos – 2026

M

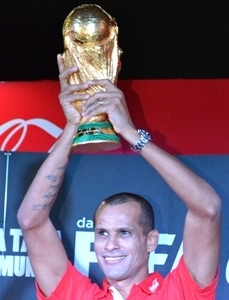
Rivaldo

- Marcelo Macedo – Panserraikos – 2008
- Maciel – Skoda Xanthi – 2008–2009
- Madson – Atromitos – 2017–2020
- Leandro Moysés Magalhães – Panionios – 1990–1992
- Yuri Mamute – Panathinaikos – 2016
- Gustavo Mancha – Olympiacos – 2025–
- Gustavo Manduca – AEK Athens – 2006–2010
- Mansur – Atromitos – 2024–2026
- Marcelão – Asteras Tripolis – 2008–2010
- Marcelinho – Skoda Xanthi, Atromitos – 2009–2013 2015–2016
- Marcelo – Olympiacos – 2022–2023
- Maricá – AEK Athens, Aris – 2001, 2004–2005
- Marlon – Thrasyvoulos – 2008–2009
- Gustavo Marmentini – Lamia – 2022–2023
- Rogério Martins – Asteras Tripolis, Ergotelis, Levadiakos, Niki Volos, Panthrakikos – 2007–2009, 2010–2016
- Léo Matos – PAOK – 2016–2020
- Marcelo Mattos – Panathinaikos – 2007–2009
- Maurício – Ergotelis – 2008–2009
- Maurício – PAOK, Panathinaikos – 2017–2022
- Vitor Meer – Iraklis – 2026–
- Melinho – Akratitos – 2002–2003
- Michel – Aris – 2010–2012
- Luís Miguel – Thrasyvoulos – 2008–2009
- Léo Mineiro – Skoda Xanthi – 2005–2006
- Rodrigo Moledo – Panathinaikos – 2016–2018
- Éder Monteiro – Kerkyra – 2012–2013
- Davidson Morais – OFI – 2005–2006
- Gabriel Almeida Moreira – Kastoria – 1996–1997
- Marcelo Moretto – AEK Athens – 2007–2008

N

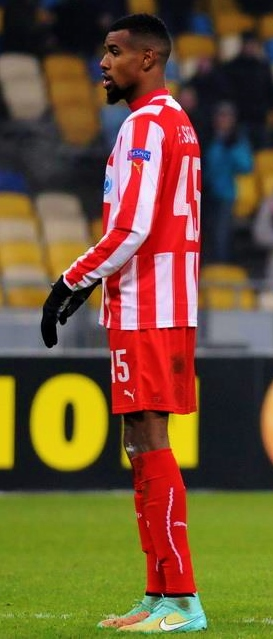
Felipe Santana

- Neizinho – Aris – 1996–1997
- Neto – Aris – 2007–2012
- Marcelo Nicácio – Skoda Xanthi – 2005

O

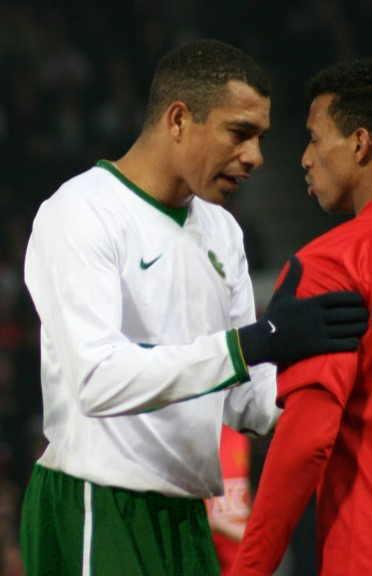
Gilberto Silva

- Anderson do Ó – Levadiakos – 2005–2006, 2007–2008
- Alex Oliveira – OFI – 2004–2005
- Claudio Alves Oliveira – Kalamata – 1999–2001
- Marcelo Oliveira – Atromitos – 2006–2011
- Renan Oliveira – Skoda Xanthi – 2015
- Leonardo André Ribeiro Orcay – Ethnikos Asteras – 1999
- Orestes – Veria – 2012–2014

P

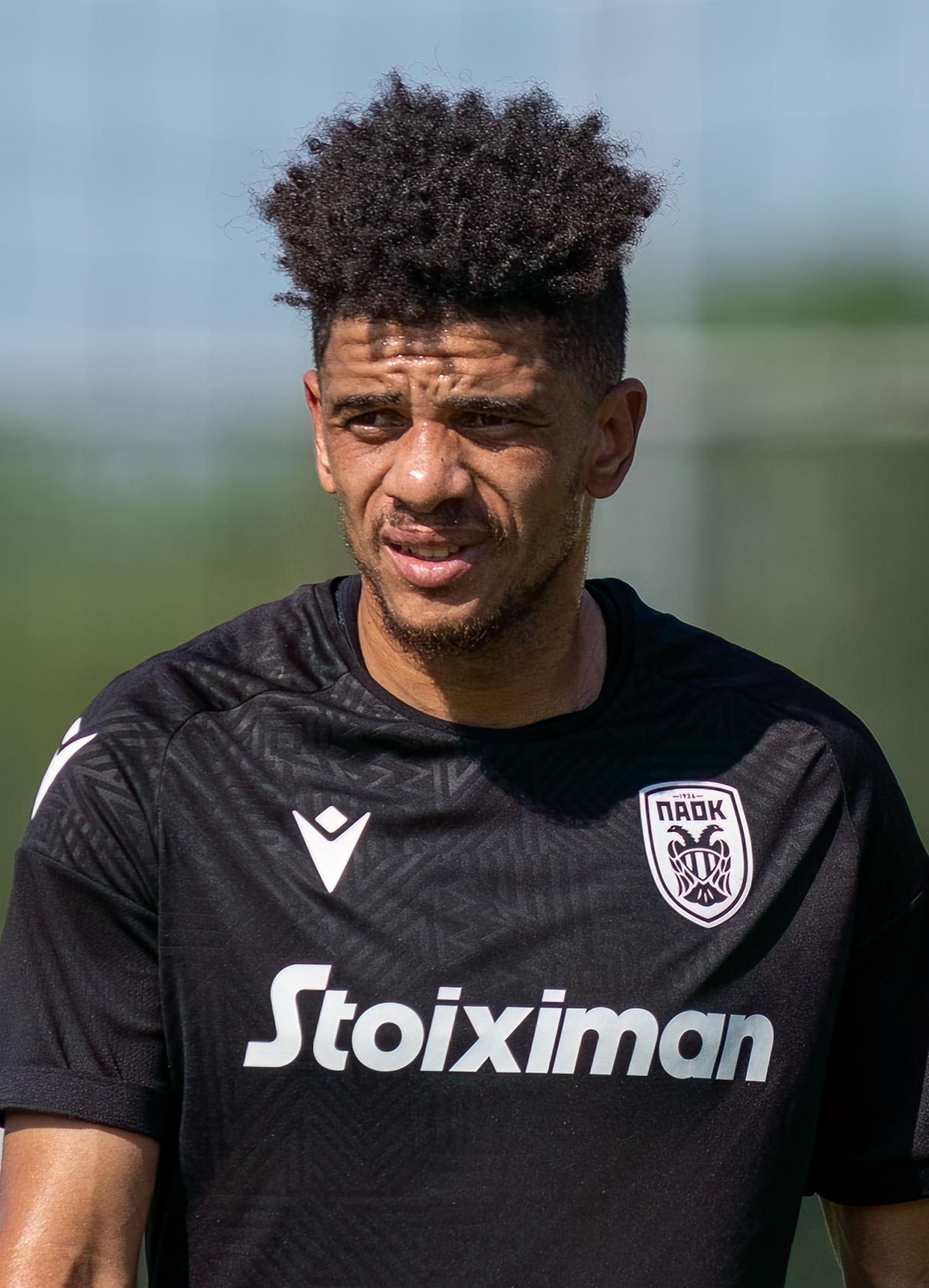
Taison

- Paquito – OFI – 2009–2010
- Alex José de Paula – Levadiakos – 2005–2007
- Marcelo Paulino – Kastoria – 1996–1997
- Marcelinho Paulista – Panionios – 2001–2002
- Marcos Paulo – Panetolikos – 2015–2019
- Peterson Peçanha – Thrasyvoulos – 2008–2009
- Sebastião Pereira – Apollon Kalamarias – 1985–1986
- Wellington Pessoa – Ergotelis – 2012–2014
- Luiz Phellype – OFI – 2022, 2023–2024
- Piá – PAOK – 2007
- Gabriel Pires – Panserraikos – 2025
- Felipe Pires – Volos – 2023
- Marcelo Pletsch – Panionios – 2006–2008
- Lucas Poletto – Xanthi – 2019–2020

Q

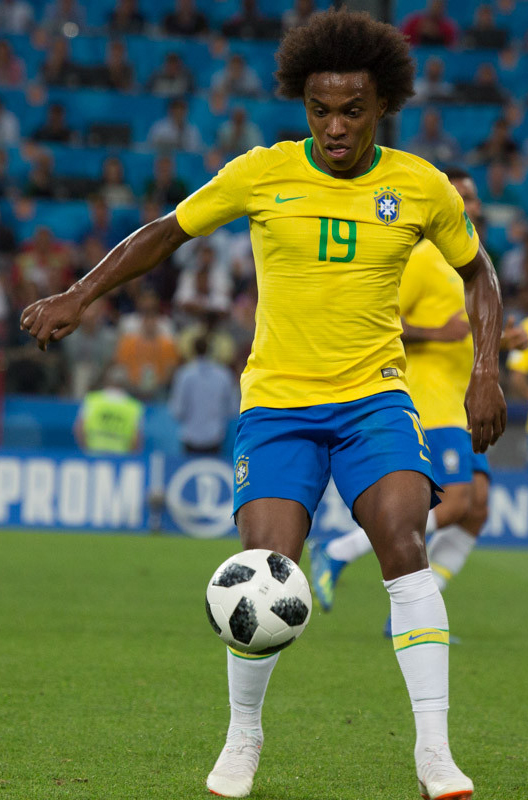
Willian

- Queven – Kerkyra – 2017–2019

R

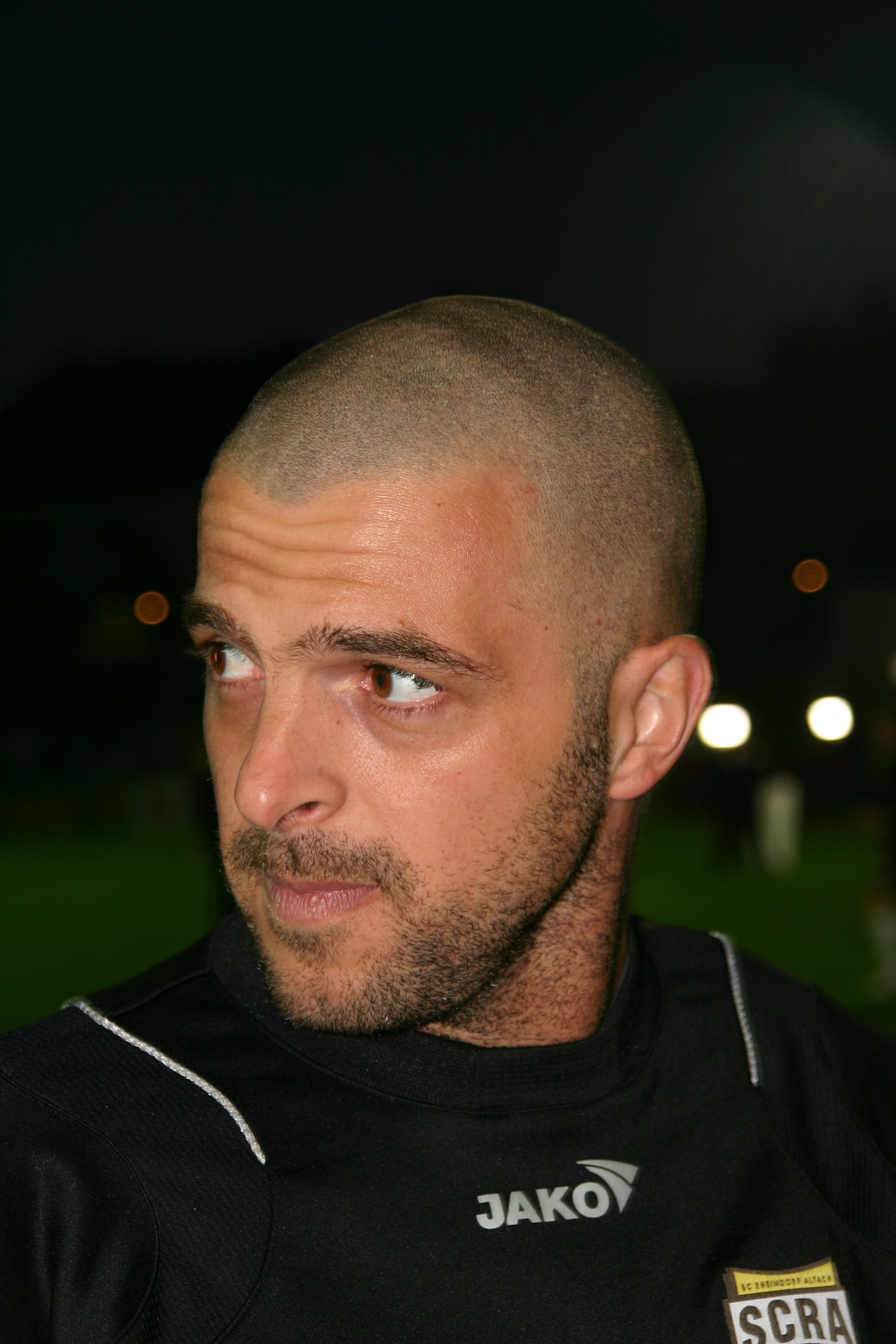
Zé Elias

- Rafael – Akratitos – 2002
- Rafinha – Olympiacos – 2020–2021
- Ramon – Olympiacos – 2023–2025
- Lucas Ramos – Lamia – 2019–2020
- Edson Ratinho – AEK Athens – 2007–2009
- Régis – Levadiakos – 2022
- Douglas Rinaldi – Apollon Kalamarias – 2004
- Diogo Rincón – Kavala – 2009–2011
- Riquelme – Panserraikos – 2026
- Rivaldo – Olympiacos, AEK Athens – 2004–2008
- Roberto – Asteras Tripolis – 2010–2011
- Robinho – Panthrakikos – 2008–2009
- André Rocha – Panetolikos – 2011–2012
- Rodinei – Olympiacos – 2023–2026
- Rogerinho – Skoda Xanthi – 2005
- Rondinely – Apollon Kalamarias – 2004–2005
- Ademar Dorneles Rodrigues – Kalamata – 1996–1997
- Rodrigues – Kalamata – 2026–
- Romeu – AEL, Panthrakikos, Levadiakos – 2009–2011, 2012–2016
- Roque – Panionios – 1999–2000
- Farley Rosa – Panetolikos, Atromitos – 2016–2018, 2019–2020, 2026

S

- Vítor Saba – AEL Kalloni – 2015–2016
- Edu Sales – Akratitos – 2005–2006
- Leandro Salino – Olympiacos – 2013–2016
- Sandro – Skoda Xanthi – 1989–1992
- Sandro – Kalamata – 1999–2000
- Felipe Santana – Olympiacos – 2015
- Gleison Santos – Skoda Xanthi – 2010–2011, 2012–2013
- Mateus Santos – A.E. Kifisia – 2023–2024
- Lucas Sasha – Aris – 2019–2022
- Pedro Sass – Levadiakos – 2013–2014
- Gustavo Scarpa – Olympiacos – 2023
- Tales Schütz – Akratitos – 2004
- Sebá – Olympiacos, Ionikos – 2015–2019, 2022–2023
- Antonio da Silva Serinia – Kavala – 2000
- Sidcley – PAOK, Lamia – 2021–2022, 2023–2024
- Alexandre Silva – Skoda Xanthi – 2000–2001
- Gilberto Silva – Panathinaikos – 2008–2011
- Igor Silva – Asteras Tripolis, Olympiacos – 2016–2018
- Mauro Silva – Panathinaikos, OFI – 1998–2001
- Renato Piovezanf – Aris – 2009–2010
- Diogo Siston – Aris, Levadiakos – 2007–2010
- Alessandro Soares – Kalamata, OFI, AEK Athens – 1997–2006
- Rodrigo Soares – PAOK – 2019–2022
- Tiquinho Soares – Olympiacos – 2021–2022
- Souza – Panathinaikos – 2008
- Alessandro Souza – Ethnikos Piraeus – 1998–1999
- Dennis Souza – OFI, Apollon Smyrnis – 2011–2014
- Felipe Souza – OFI – 2019–2020
- Juliano Spadacio – PAOK – 2011
- Gabriel Strefezza – Olympiacos – 2025–2026

T

- Taison – PAOK – 2023–
- Tanielton – Skoda Xanthi – 2000–2001
- Lucas Taylor – PAOK – 2021–2022
- Alex Teixeira – Panserraikos – 2026
- Terrão – Skoda Xanthi – 2001–2002
- Tetê – Panathinaikos – 2024–2026
- Thomás – Apollon Smyrnis, Atromitos – 2018–2022
- Ticão – Olympiacos Volos – 2010–2011
- Tico – Panionios – 1998–2000
- Léo Tilica – Asteras Tripolis – 2020–2023
- Thuram – Kerkyra, Lamia, Ionikos – 2016–2020, 2021–2022
- Tinga – Aris – 2006
- Jonas Toró – Panathinaikos, Levadiakos – 2022–2024
- Rodrigo Tosi – Iraklis – 2007
- Tuta – Aris – 2006

U

V

- Celinho Valentim – Athinaikos – 2000–2001
- Vanderson – PAS Giannina, Platanias, Lamia, Panetolikos – 2009–2012, 2015–2021
- Vandinho – OFI – 2011–2012
- Matheus Vargas – Kerkyra – 2017–2018
- Vela – Apollon Kalamarias, AEL – 2004–2008
- Marcelo Veridiano – Skoda Xanthi, AEK Athens – 1989–1998
- Bruno Viana – Olympiacos – 2016–2017
- João Victor – OFI – 2020
- Higor Vidal – PAS Giannina – 2016–2019
- Edson Vieira – Edessaikos – 1997
- Vilmar – Edessaikos – 1996–1997
- Vinícius – AEL – 2020
- Vinícius – AEK Athens – 2017–2018
- Mateus Vital – Panathinaikos – 2021–2022
- Matheus Vivian – PAOK – 2012–2013

W

- Wallace – Xanthi, AEL – 2014–2018
- Wanderson – Olympiacos, Doxa Drama, Lamia – 2009–2012, 2017–2018
- Washington – Panionios – 2018
- Guilherme Weisheimer – Aris – 2005–2007
- Wellington – OFI – 2006–2007
- Willian – Olympiacos – 2024
- Willyan – Panetolikos – 2018–2019

X

Y

Z

- Zé Eduardo – OFI – 2013–2014
- Zé Elias – Olympiacos – 2000–2003

=== Chile ===
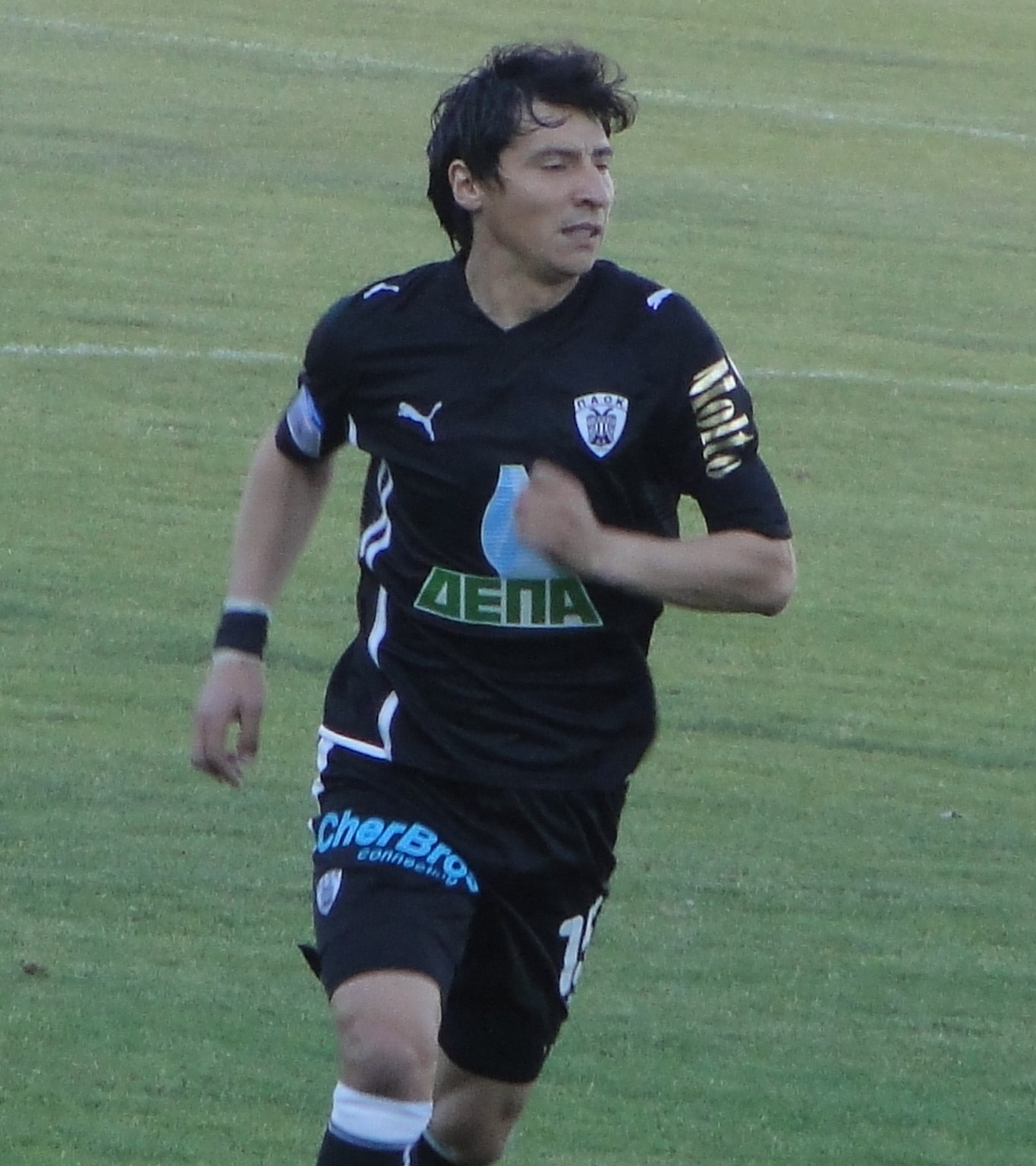
Pablo Contreras

- Mario Cáceres – Aris – 2005
- Alejandro Carrasco – Skoda Xanthi – 2003
- Pablo Contreras – PAOK, Olympiacos – 2008–2013
- Julio Crisosto – Panathinaikos – 1981
- Fabián Estay – Olympiacos – 1993–1995
- Felipe Gallegos – OFI – 2021–2022, 2023–2024
- Gamadiel Garcia – Skoda Xanthi – 2007
- Ángelo Henríquez – Lamia – 2024–2025
- César Henríquez – Panthrakikos – 2008–2009
- Alejandro Hisis – OFI – 1985–1990
- José Luis Jerez – Panserraikos – 2008
- Eros Pérez – Skoda Xanthi – 2003–2004
- Dante Poli – Skoda Xanthi – 2003–2004
- Bryan Rabello – Atromitos – 2020–2021
- Ángel Rojas – Kerkyra – 2014–2015
- Ángelo Sagal – AEL, A.E. Kifisia – 2025–
- Francisco Ugarte – PAS Giannina – 1990–1991
- Marcelo Urzúa – Diagoras – 1988–1989
- Diego Valencia – Atromitos – 2023–2024
- Miguel Vargas – OFI – 1998–2000
- Jaime Vera – OFI – 1987–1992

=== Colombia ===
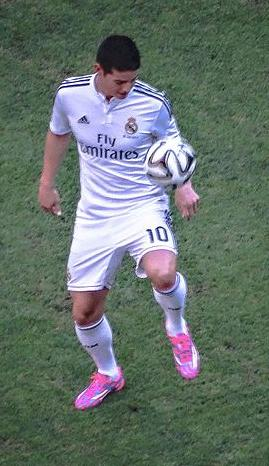
James Rodriguez

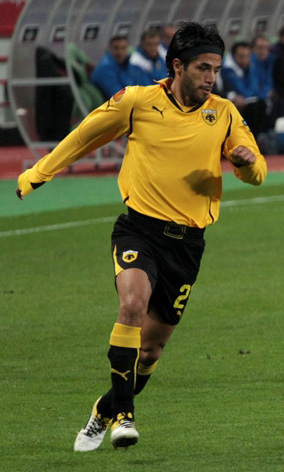
Fabián Vargas

- Diego Arias – PAOK – 2011–2012
- Lener Baltan – Ionikos – 2000
- Jorge Bermúdez – Olympiacos – 2001–2003
- Marcelino Carreazo – Kalamata – 2026–
- Didier Delgado – Ionikos – 2021
- Fabry – PAS Giannina, Apollon Smyrnis – 2018–2022
- Víctor Ibarbo – Panathinaikos – 2016–2017
- Félix García – Iraklis – 2004–2005
- Reinaldo Lenis – Ionikos – 2021–2022
- Jeison Medina – Lamia – 2023
- Mateo Mejía – Panetolikos – 2026–
- Erik Moreno – Panetolikos – 2014–2015
- Luis Mosquera – Panetolikos – 2020–2021
- Santiago Mosquera – OFI – 2023–2024
- Gustavo Díaz Palacios – Ethnikos Piraeus – 1997–1998
- Felipe Pardo – Olympiacos – 2015–2019
- Juan José Perea – Panathinaikos, Volos, PAS Giannina, Atromitos – 2019–2022, 2026–
- Juan Pablo Pino – Olympiacos – 2012–2013
- Andrés Felipe Roa – Panetolikos – 2024–2025
- James Rodríguez – Olympiacos – 2022–2023
- Kevin Rosero – Volos, PAS Giannina – 2021–2024
- Juan Camilo Salazar – Panserraikos – 2024–2025
- Juan Toja – Aris – 2010–2012
- Adolfo Valencia – PAOK – 1999–2000
- Fabián Vargas – AEK Athens – 2011–2012

=== Ecuador ===
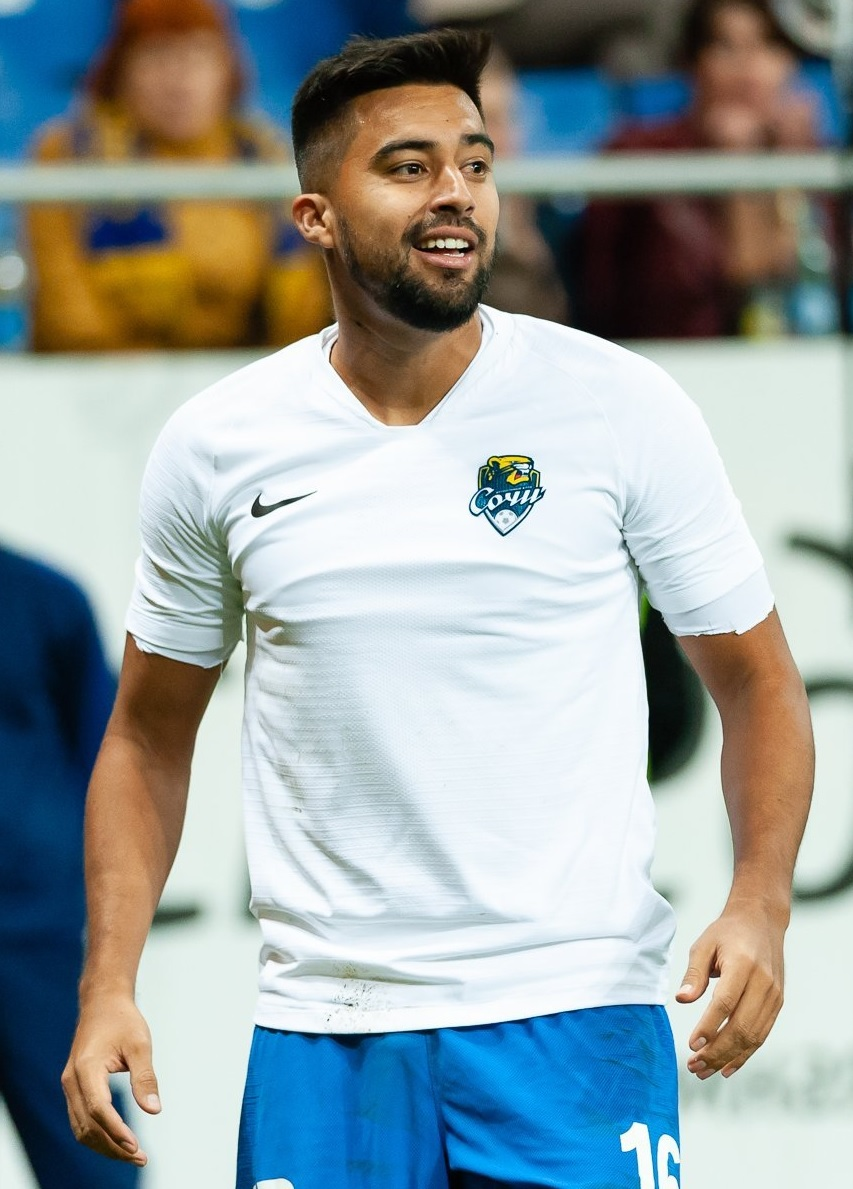
Christian Noboa

- Manu Balda – Panthrakikos – 2015
- Félix Borja – Olympiacos – 2006–2007
- Bryan Cabezas – Panathinaikos – 2017–2018
- José Cifuentes – Aris – 2024–2025
- Erick Ferigra – AEL – 2025–2026
- Christian Noboa – PAOK – 2015
- Juan Carlos Paredes – Olympiacos – 2017
- Jackson Porozo – Olympiacos – 2023–2024
- Gustavo Puerta – Olympiacos – 2026–
- Moisés Ramírez – A.E. Kifisia – 2025–
- Kike Saverio – Aris – 2023–2025

=== Paraguay ===
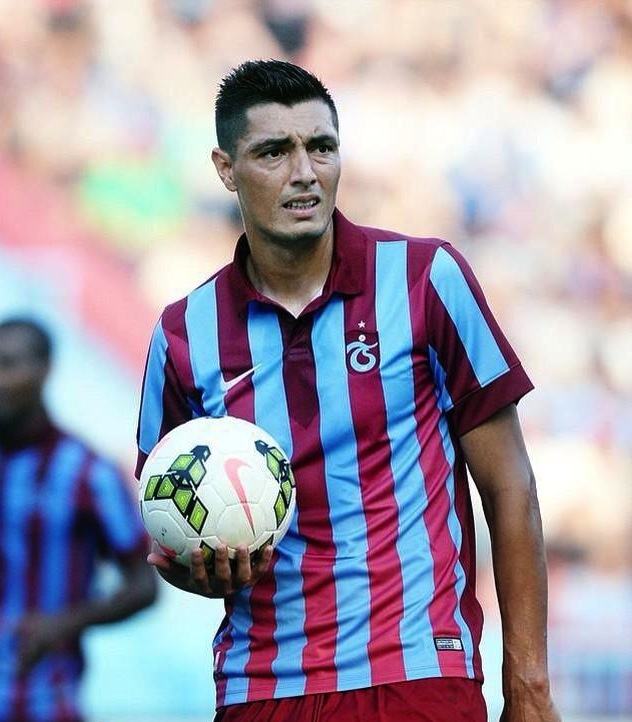
Óscar Cardozo

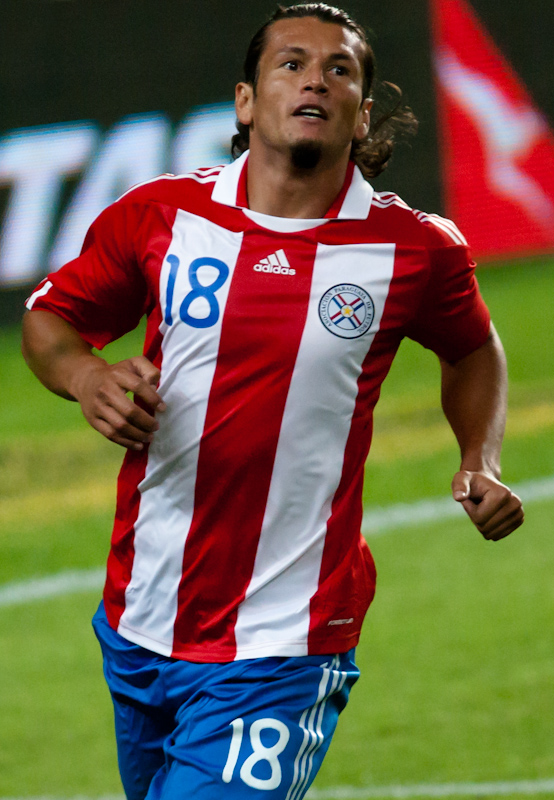
Nelson Valdez

- Nery Bareiro – OFI – 2014
- Jorge Benítez – Olympiacos – 2014–2015
- Raúl Bobadilla – Aris – 2011
- Jorge Brítez – Panserraikos – 2010
- Óscar Cardozo – Ólympiacos – 2016–2017
- Sergio Díaz – Panetolikos – 2023–2025
- Carlos Gamarra – AEK Athens – 2001–2002
- Juan Iturbe – Aris – 2021–2023
- David Meza – Atromitos – 2007
- Hernán Pérez – Olympiacos – 2013–2014
- Fabián Sánchez – Atromitos – 2007–2008
- Nelson Valdez – Olympiacos – 2013–2014

=== Peru ===
- Piero Alva – Skoda Xanthi – 2007–2008
- Carlos Ascues – Panetolikos – 2013–2015
- Carlos Basombrío – Veria – 1999
- Juan Carlos Bazalar – Veria – 1999
- Alexander Callens – AEK Athens – 2023–2026
- César Charún – Paniliakos – 1997–1999
- David Chévez – Aris – 1998–1999
- Paul Cominges – PAOK, OFI, Panachaiki – 1996–1998, 2001–2002
- Roberto Farfán – Veria – 1999
- Carlos Flores – Aris – 1998–1999
- Luis Guadalupe – Veria – 2007
- Jorge Huamán – Veria – 1999
- Paolo Maldonado – Skoda Xanthi – 1998
- José Mendoza – Veria – 2007
- Roberto Merino – Akratitos, Atromitos – 2005–2008
- Darío Muchotrigo – Ionikos – 1998–2001
- Percy Olivares – PAOK, Panathinaikos – 1997–1999
- Juan José Oré – Panathinaikos, OFI – 1979–1982
- Juan Pajuelo – Ionikos – 2005–2007
- Sergio Peña – PAOK – 2025
- Jorge Ramírez – Skoda Xanthi – 1998–1999
- Miguel Rebosio – PAOK – 2006
- Martín Rodríguez – Ionikos – 1998–2000
- César Rosales – Paniliakos – 1998–2000
- Frank Ruiz – Veria – 1999
- Nolberto Solano – AEL – 2008
- Carlos Zambrano – PAOK – 2017
- Franco Zanelatto – OFI – 2025–2026
- Carlos Zegarra – PAOK – 2006

=== Uruguay ===
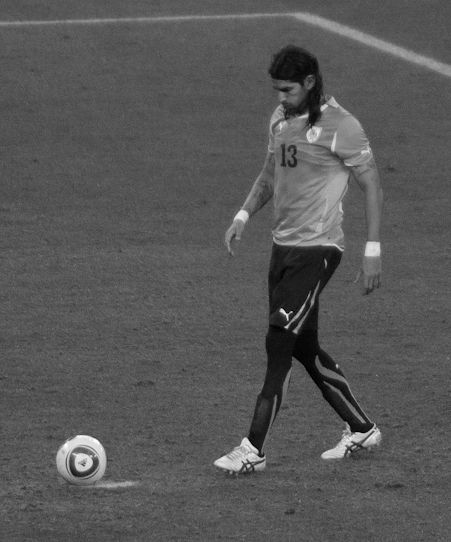
Sebastián Abreu

A

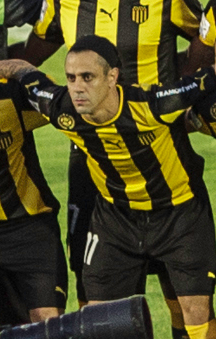
Fabián Estoyanoff

- Sebastián Abreu – Aris – 2009–2010
- Mathías Acuña – Lamia – 2023–2024
- Carlos Aguiar – Skoda Xanthi – 2002–2003
- Diego Aguirre – Olympiacos – 1988
- Alejandro Alonso – Egaleo – 2001–2002
- Pablo Álvarez – Panserraikos – 2010–2011
- Gabriel Álvez – Olympiacos – 2000–2002

B

- Adrián Balboa – Panathinaikos – 2013–2014
- Jean Barrientos – Xanthi, Volos – 2019–2024
- Jorge Barrios – Olympiacos, Levadiakos – 1985–1991
- Joe Bizera – PAOK – 2008–2010
- Gerónimo Bortagaray – PAS Giannina – 2023–2024

C

- Fabián Canobbio – AEL – 2010–2011
- Walter Caprile – Trikala – 1999–2000
- Mathías Cardaccio – Asteras Tripolis – 2012–2013
- Adrián Colombino – AEL, Panserraikos – 2021–2022, 2023–2024
- Luis Curbelo – Ionikos – 2000–2003

D

- Claudio Dadómo – AEK Athens, Ergotelis – 2010–2011
- Carlos de Castro – Thrasyvoulos – 2008
- Darío Delgado – Ionikos – 2000–2003
- Jorge Díaz – Panetolikos, A.E. Kifisia – 2017–2023, 2025–2026
- Juan Manuel Díaz – AEK Athens – 2016–2017

E

- Vicente Estavillo – Olympiacos, PAS Giannina – 1981–1984
- Fabián Estoyanoff – Panionios – 2008–2012

F

- Miguel Falero – Apollon Athens – 1985–1987
- Jorge Falero Fanìs – AEK Athens – 1973–1975
- Luis Fernández – Apollon Athens – 1985–1987
- Bruno Fornaroli – Panathinaikos – 2012–2013

G

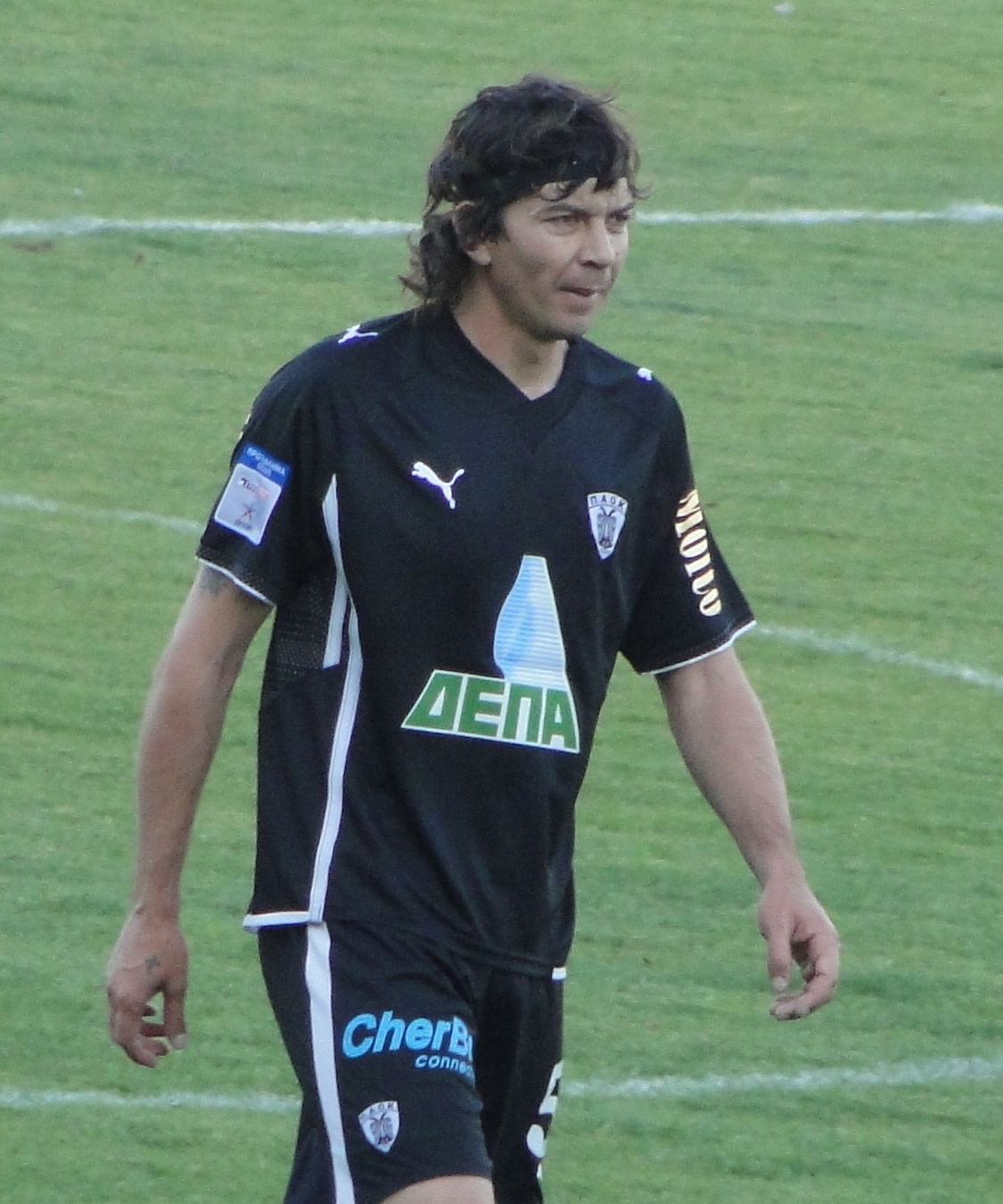
Pablo García

- Pablo Gaglianone – Kavala – 1999
- Pablo García – PAOK, Skoda Xanthi – 2008–2014
- Federico Gino – PAS Giannina – 2023–2024
- Gonzalo González – Apollon Smyrnis – 2018
- Nacho González – Levadiakos – 2010

H

I

J

K

L

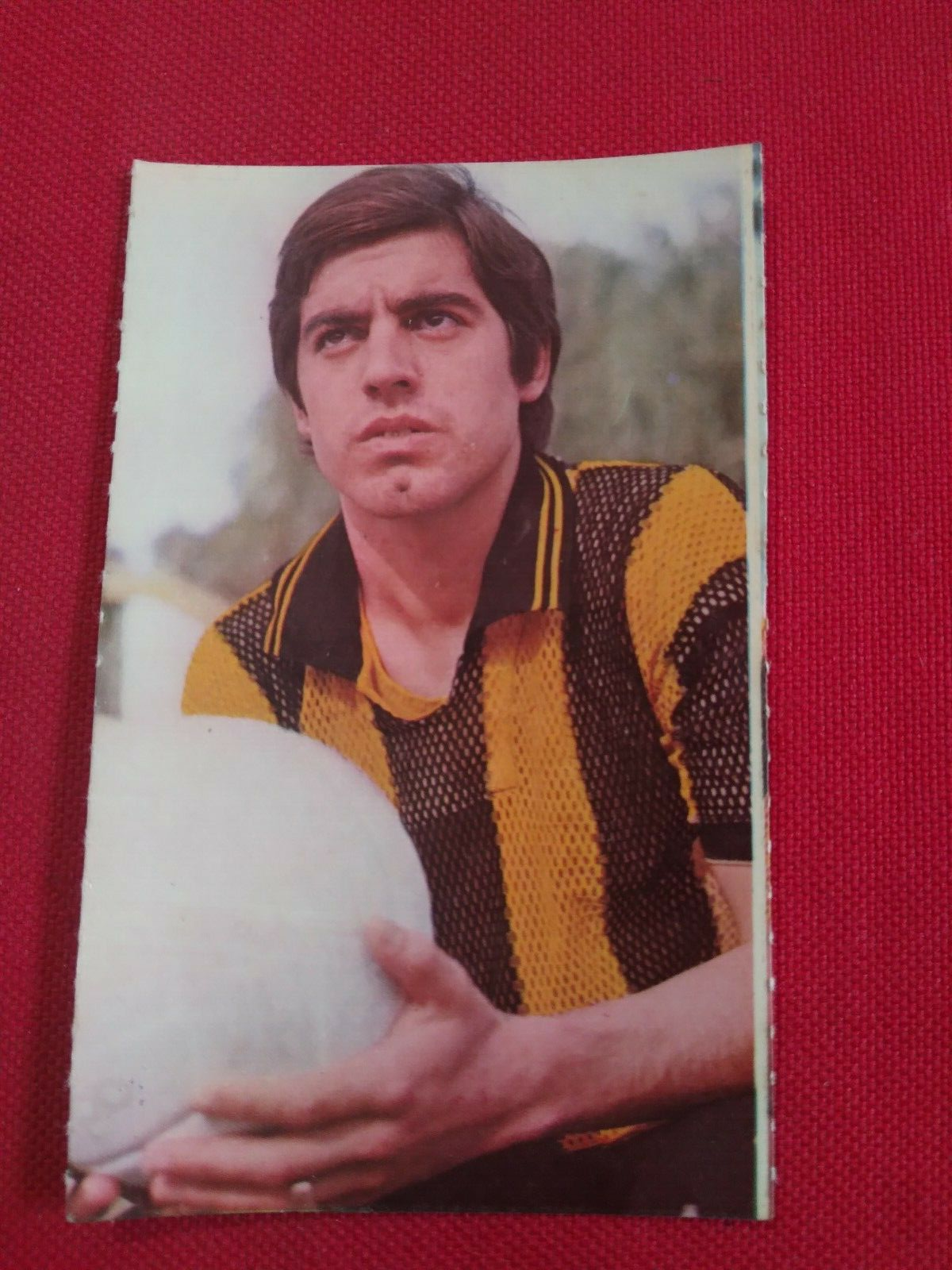
Julio Losada

- Sergio Leal – Ergotelis, Kerkyra – 2009–2012, 2015
- Alejandro Lembo – Aris – 2008–2009
- Kevin Lewis – OFI – 2025–2026
- Pablo Lima – Iraklis – 2010–2011
- Carlos Linaris – Panathinaikos – 1971–1973
- Marcelo Lipatín – PAS Giannina – 2000–2001
- Rodrigo López – Kavala – 1998–1999
- Julio Losada – Olympiacos – 1972–1982

M

- Fernando Machado – Asteras Tripolis, Levadiakos – 2007–2010
- Carlos Marcora – Paniliakos, Panionios – 2003–2005
- Nicolás Mezquida – Volos – 2022–2023
- Maximiliano Moreira – Panserraikos, Levadiakos – 2023–2025

N

O

- Bryan Olivera – Volos – 2024

P

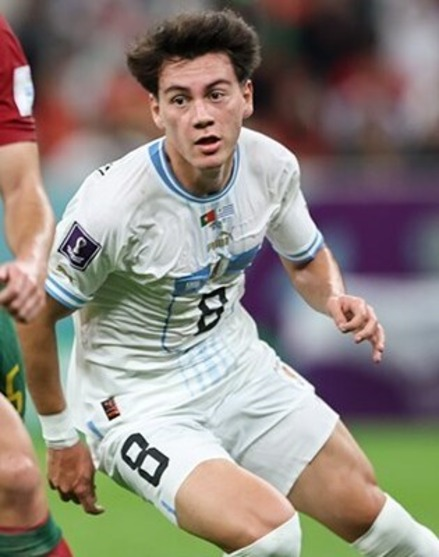
Facundo Pellistri

- Juan Martín Parodi – Panionios – 2003–2004
- Miguel Peirano – Levadiakos – 1987–1989
- Facundo Pellistri – Panathinaikos – 2024–
- Ignatio Peña – Olympiacos – 1974–1975
- Rafael Perone – Olympiacos – 1978–1980
- Diego Perrone – Levadiakos – 2006
- Sebastián Píriz – Panionios – 2018–2019
- Jorge Puglia – PAS Giannina – 2001

Q

- Nicolás Quagliata – PAOK – 2022–2025

R

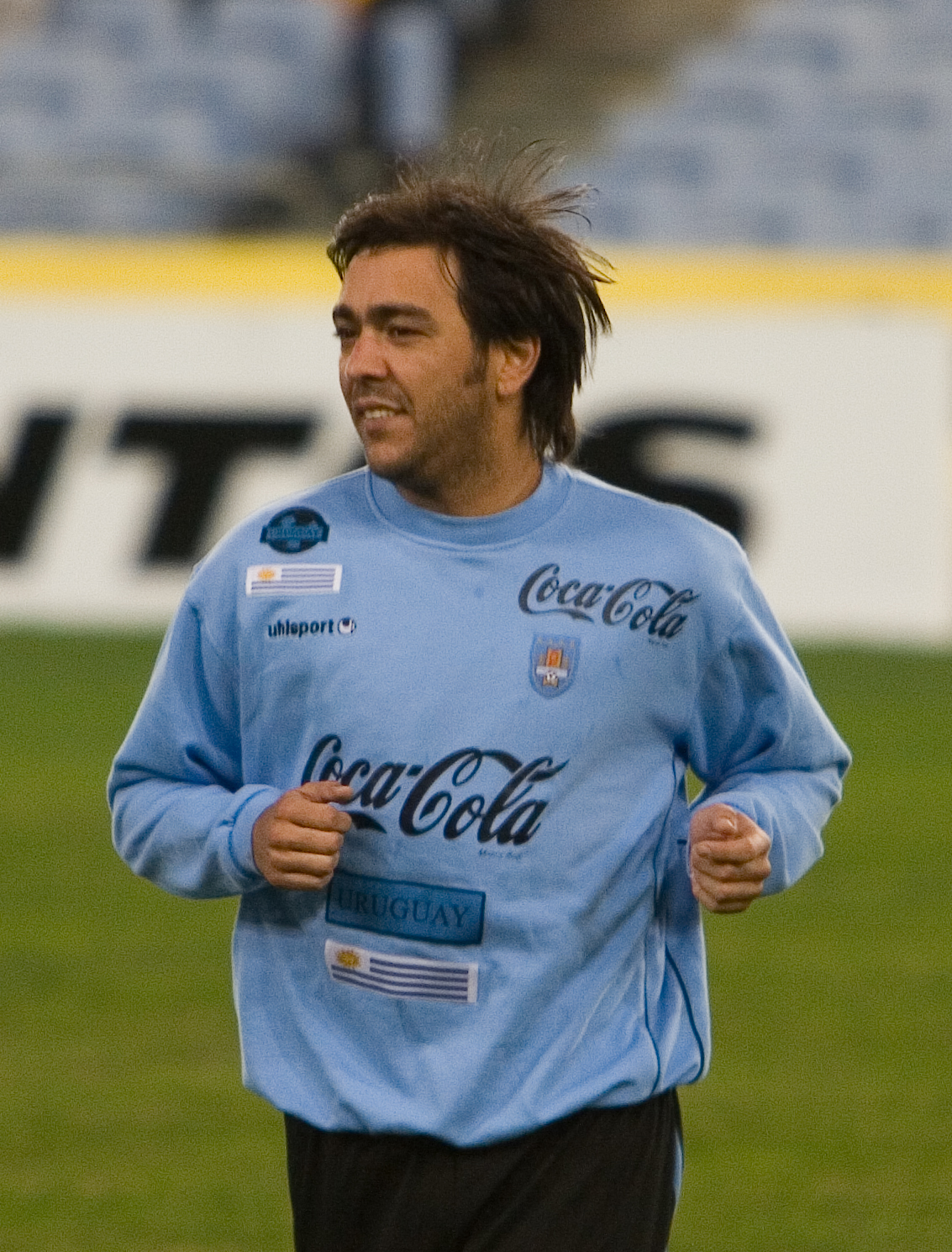
Álvaro Recoba

- Álvaro Recoba – Panionios – 2008–2010
- Mario Regueiro – Aris – 2008–2009
- Claudio Rivero – Panionios – 2013
- Marcel Román – Iraklis – 2010–2011
- Franco Romero – Volos – 2021–2022

S

- Rodrigo Sanguinetti – Levadiakos – 2013–2014
- Nicolás Schenone – PAS Giannina – 2009–2010
- Gerardo Severo – Paniliakos – 1997–1998
- Damián Silva – Athens Kallithea – 2024
- Leandro Sosa – Xanthi – 2019–2020

T

- Francisco Tinaglini – Panserraikos – 2025–2026
- Mathías Tomás – Panserraikos – 2023–2025

U

V

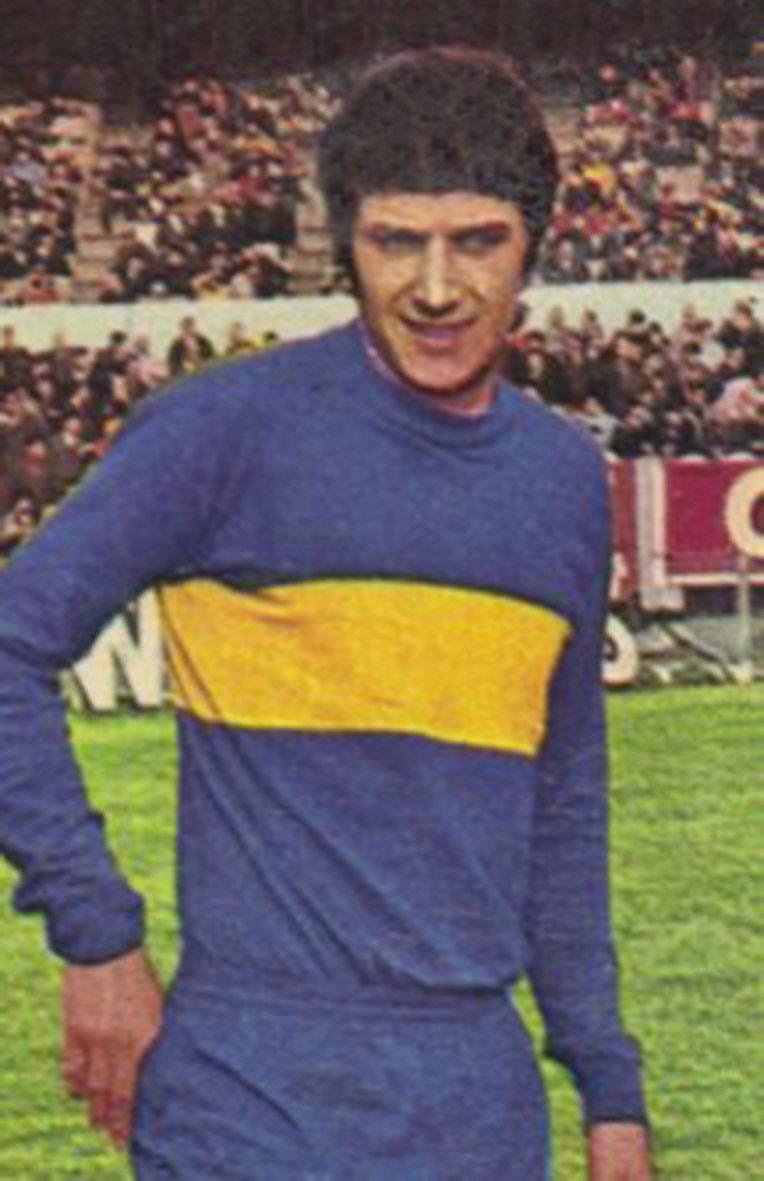
Milton Viera

- Nico Varela – AEL – 2016–2017
- Agustín Viana – Levadiakos – 2011–2012
- Milton Viera – Olympiacos, AEK Athens – 1972–1979
- Sebastián Viera – AEL – 2009–2010

W

X

Y

Z

=== Venezuela ===
- Rubén Arocha – Platanias – 2012–2013
- Alain Baroja – AEK Athens – 2015–2016
- Jovanny Bolívar – Kalamata – 2026–
- César Castro – Atromitos, Panserraikos – 2007–2008, 2010–2011
- Joel Graterol – Panetolikos – 2023–2024
- Dani Hernández – Asteras Tripolis – 2013–2014
- Francisco Pol Hurtado – Asteras Tripolis, AEL – 2012–2014, 2016–2017
- Jan Carlos Hurtado – Volos – 2026–
- Juanpi – Panetolikos, Volos – 2023–2024, 2025–2026
- Josua Mejías – Athens Kallithea – 2024–2025
- Ricardo Páez – Veria – 2007–2008
- Brayan Palmezano – Atromitos – 2025–2026
- José Romo – Levadiakos – 2024–2025
- Ronald Vargas – AEK Athens – 2015–2017
- José Manuel Velázquez – Panathinaikos – 2012–2014
- Miguel Mea Vitali – Levadiakos – 2006

== Notes ==
1. First ever foreign football player in Greece.
2. Born in Angola
3. Born in Argentina
4. Born in Austria
5. Born in Belgium
6. Born in Bosnia and Herzegovina (then part of SFR Yugoslavia)
7. Born in Burkina Faso
8. Born in Brazil
9. Born in Cameroon
10. Born in Canada
11. Born in Chile
12. Born in Croatia (then part of SFR Yugoslavia)
13. Born in the Democratic Republic of Congo
14. Born in the Democratic Republic of Congo (then Belgian Congo)
15. Born in Cape Verde
16. Born in the Democratic Republic of Congo (then Zaïre)
17. Born in Denmark
18. Born in England
19. Born in Ethiopia
20. Born in France
21. Born in French Polynesia (Overseas department of the French Republic)
22. Born in Georgia (then part of Soviet Union)
23. Born in Ghana
24. Born in Greece
25. Born in Guadeloupe (Overseas department of the French Republic)
26. Born in Guinea-Bissau
27. Born in Haiti
28. Born in Ivory Coast
29. Born in Italy
30. Born in Kosovo (then part of SFR Yugoslavia)
31. Born in Kuwait
32. Born in Liberia
33. Born in Malawi
34. Born in Martinique (Overseas department of the French Republic)
35. Born in Mexico
36. Born in Montenegro (then part of SFR Yugoslavia)
37. Born in Morocco
38. Born in the Netherlands
39. Born in New Caledonia (Overseas department of the French Republic)
40. Born in Nigeria
41. Born in Poland
42. Born in Portugal
43. Born in Réunion (Overseas department of the French Republic)
44. Born in Romania
45. Born in Russia
46. Born in Serbia (then part of SFR Yugoslavia)
47. Born in Serbia (then part of FR Yugoslavia)
48. Born in Slovakia (then part of Czechoslovakia)
49. Born in Somalia
50. Born in South Africa
51. Born in Spain
52. Born in Swaziland
53. Born in Sweden
54. Born in Switzerland
55. Born in Syria
56. Born in The Gambia
57. Born in Uganda
58. Born in the United States of America
59. Born in Uruguay
60. Born in West Germany (now part of Germany)
61. Born in Zimbabwe (now Rhodesia)
62. Capped for the Austria national under-21 football team
63. Capped for the Belgium national football team
64. Capped for the Belgium national under-21 football team
65. Capped for the Belgium national under-19 football team
66. Capped for the Belgium national under-18 football team
67. Capped for the Belgium national under-17 football team
68. Capped for the Belgium national under-16 football team
69. Capped for the Belgium national under-15 football team
70. Capped for the Bosnia and Herzegovina national under-21 football team
71. Capped for the Bulgaria national under-21 football team
72. Capped for the Canada national football team
73. Capped for the Canada national under-20 football team
74. Capped for the Catalonia national football team
75. Capped for the Corsica national football team
76. Capped for the England national under-19 football team
77. Capped for the England national under-16 football team
78. Capped for the France national under-21 football team
79. Capped for the France national under-20 football team
80. Capped for the France national under-19 football team
81. Capped for the France national under-18 football team
82. Capped for the France national under-17 football team
83. Capped for the France national under-16 football team
84. Capped for the France national under-15 football team
85. Capped for the Germany national under-21 football team
86. Capped for the Germany national under-20 football team
87. Capped for the Greece national football team
88. Capped for the Greece national under-21 football team
89. Capped for the Greece national under-19 football team
90. Capped for the Italy national under-16 football team
91. Capped for the Morocco national under-16 football team
92. Capped for the Netherlands national under-19 football team
93. Capped for the Netherlands national under-17 football team
94. Capped for the Netherlands national under-15 football team
95. Capped for the Norway national under-21 football team
96. Capped for the Norway national under-19 football team
97. Capped for the Norway national under-18 football team
98. Capped for the Norway national under-17 football team
99. Capped for the Norway national under-16 football team
100. Capped for the Norway national under-15 football team
101. Capped for the Nigeria national under-20 football team
102. Capped for the Peru national under-20 football team
103. Capped for the Portugal national under-23 football team
104. Capped for the Portugal national under-21 football team
105. Capped for the Portugal national under-20 football team
106. Capped for the Portugal national under-18 football team
107. Capped for the Portugal national under-17 football team
108. Capped for the Portugal national under-16 football team
109. Capped for the Portugal national under-15 football team
110. Capped for the Poland national under-15 football team
111. Capped for the Russia national under-21 football team
112. Capped for the Russia national under-19 football team
113. Capped for the Serbia national under-21 football team
114. Capped for the Serbia national under-19 football team
115. Capped for the Spain national under-21 football team
116. Capped for the Sweden men's national football team
117. Capped for the Sweden national under-23 football team
118. Capped for the Sweden national under-21 football team
119. Capped for the Sweden men's national under-19 football team
120. Capped for the Sweden national under-18 football team
121. Capped for the Sweden men's national under-17 football team
122. Capped for the Sweden national under-16 football team
123. Capped for the Sweden national under-15 football team
124. Capped for the Switzerland national under-21 football team
125. Capped for the Switzerland national under-20 football team
126. Capped for the Switzerland national under-19 football team
127. Capped for the Switzerland national under-18 football team
128. Capped for the Switzerland national under-17 football team
129. Capped for the Switzerland national under-16 football team
