= List of Panathinaikos F.C. players =

Albania

- (Albania) Ergin Büçi
- (Albania) Enis Çokaj
- (Albania) (Greece) Elton Fikaj
- (Albania) (Greece) Leandro Frroku
- (Albania) Ergys Kaçe
- (Albania) (Greece) Bledar Kola
- (Albania) (Greece) Klidman Lilo
- (Albania) Mateo Rüsit
- (Albania) (Greece) Adriano Skenderaj
- (Albania) (Greece) Kristo Shehu
- (Albania) (Greece) Orgesi Sulce
- (Albania) (Greece) Rushit Zeka
- (Albania) (England) Aidon Shehu

Algeria

- (Algeria) (France) Mehdi Abeid
- (Algeria) (France) Walid Abeid
- (Algeria) (Belgium) (France) Ahmed Touba

Angola

- (Angola) (Portugal) Manucho

Argentina

- (Argentina) Óscar Álvarez
- (Argentina) (Italy) Santino Andino
- (Argentina) Roberto Gramajo
- (Argentina) Marcelino Britapaja
- (Argentina) Roque Alfaro
- (Argentina) (Greece) Raúl Valian
- (Argentina) Juan Ramón Verón
- (Argentina) (Greece) Roberto Agueropolis
- (Argentina) (Italy) Luis Andreuchi
- (Argentina) (Italy) Juan José Borrelli
- (Argentina) (Italy) Lucas Chaves
- (Argentina) Fernando Galetto
- (Argentina) (Italy) Ezequiel González
- (Argentina) Víctor David López
- (Argentina) (Italy) Sebastián Leto
- (Argentina) Luciano Figueroa
- (Argentina) Andrés Chávez
- (Argentina) (Spain) Emanuel Insúa
- (Argentina) (Italy) Daniel Mancini
- (Argentina) Sebastián Palacios
- (Argentina) (Italy) Lautaro Rinaldi
- (Argentina) (Greece) Juan Ramón Rocha
- (Argentina) (Italy) Sebastián Ariel Romero
- (Argentina) Facundo Sánchez
- (Argentina) (Italy) Vicente Taborda
- (Argentina) (Paraguay) (Greece) Lucas Villafáñez

Armenia

- (Armenia) (Greece) Zareh Minasyan
- (Armenia) (Greece) David Gizgizyan
- (Armenia) (Greece) Arseni Kapamatzian
- (Armenia) (Greece) Garabet Takesian

Australia

- (Australia) (United States) (Greece) Panos Armenakas
- (Australia) (Greece) Dimitris Brinias
- (Australia) (Greece) Louis Christodoulou
- (Australia) (Greece) Chris Kalantzis
- (Australia) (Turkey) (Greece) Ulysses Kokkinos
- (Australia) (Poland) Jason Polak
- (Australia) (North Macedonia) Robert Stambolziev
- (Australia) (Greece) Andrew Vlahos

Austria

- (Austria) (Germany) Willy Fitz
- (Austria) (Croatia) Andreas Ivanschitz
- (Austria) Helmut Kirisits

Belgium

- (Belgium) (Greece) Stergos Marinos
- (Belgium) (Greece) Viktor Klonaridis

Bosnia and Herzegovina

- (Bosnia and Herzegovina) Fikret Mujkić
- (Bosnia and Herzegovina) (Sweden) Zlatan Nalić

Brazil

- (Brazil) (Venezuela) Araquem de Melo
- (Brazil) (Venezuela) Antonio Benitez Gómez
- (Brazil) Eliomar Carvalho
- (Brazil) Júlio César
- (Brazil) Mauro Silva
- (Brazil) (Greece) Anderson Lima
- (Brazil) (Spain) Flávio Conceição
- (Brazil) Ricardo Bóvio
- (Brazil) Jheimy
- (Brazil) (Greece) Cleyton
- (Brazil) (Italy) Marcelo Mattos
- (Brazil) Rodrigo Souza
- (Brazil) Gabriel
- (Brazil) Gilberto Silva
- (Brazil) David
- (Brazil) Yuri Mamute
- (Brazil) Lucas Evangelista
- (Brazil) Rodrigo Moledo
- (Brazil) Luciano
- (Brazil) (Russia) Maurício
- (Brazil) (Portugal) Mateus Vital
- (Brazil) Jonas Toró
- (Brazil) (Spain) Bernard
- (Brazil) Willian Arão
- (Brazil) Vitor Hugo
- (Brazil) Tetê
- (Brazil) (Greece) Marcos Silva
- (Brazil) Henrique Siqueira

Bulgaria

- (Bulgaria) Hristo Kolev
- (Bulgaria) (Greece) Tomas Lafchis
- (Bulgaria) Vladimir Gadzhev
- (Bulgaria) Ivan Ivanov

Cameroon

- (Cameroon) Simphorien Noundou Kinding
- (Cameroon) (Greece) Joël Epalle
- (Cameroon) Pierre Ebéde
- (Cameroon) Alain Bruno Bati Abehanga
- (Cameroon) Olivier Boumal

Chile

- (Chile) Julio Crisosto

Colombia

- (Colombia) Victor Ibarbo
- (Colombia) Juan José Perea

Congo

- (Republic of the Congo) (France) Christopher Samba

Croatia

- (Croatia) Velimir Zajec
- (Croatia) Aljoša Asanović
- (Croatia) Robert Jarni
- (Croatia) Goran Vlaović
- (Croatia) Mario Galinović
- (Croatia) Silvio Marić
- (Croatia) Daniel Šarić
- (Croatia) (Australia) Anthony Šerić
- (Croatia) Igor Bišćan
- (Croatia) Srđan Andrić
- (Croatia) Ante Rukavina
- (Croatia) (Austria) (Slovenia) Gordon Schildenfeld
- (Croatia) Danijel Pranjić
- (Croatia) (Switzerland) (Bosnia and Herzegovina) Mladen Petrić
- (Croatia) Fran Tudor
- (Croatia) Zvonimir Šarlija
- (Croatia) (Bosnia and Herzegovina) Tin Jedvaj
- (Croatia) (Greece) Iasonas Nempis
- (Croatia) Adriano Jagušić

Cyprus

- (Cyprus) Constantinos Charalambides
- (Cyprus) Andreas Christodoulou
- (Cyprus) Panikos Iakovou
- (Cyprus) Demetris Kizas
- (Cyprus) (Greece) Michalis Konstantinou
- (Cyprus) Costas Malekkos
- (Cyprus) Panagiotis Sialos
- (Cyprus) Michalis Siimitras
- (Cyprus) (Greece) Diomidis Symeonidis

Czech Republic

- (Czech Republic) Rudolf Skácel

Denmark

- (Denmark) (France) René Henriksen
- (Denmark) (France) Jan Michaelsen
- (Denmark) Claus Nielsen
- (Denmark) Kim Elgaard
- (Denmark) Rasmus Thelander
- (Denmark) Uffe Bech
- (Denmark) Victor Kristiansen

DR Congo

- (Democratic Republic of the Congo) (France) Jessy Lando Fusu
- (Democratic Republic of the Congo) (Belgium) Paul-José M'Poku
- (Democratic Republic of the Congo) (France) Yeni Ngbakoto
- (Democratic Republic of the Congo) Coque

Ecuador

- (Ecuador) Bryan Cabezas

Egypt

- (Egypt) Ahmed Hamdi

England

- (England) John Cyril Campbell
- (England) David Barnes
- (England) Smith
- (England) (Greece) Grigoris Kokolakis
- (England) Luke Steele

Finland

- (Finland) Joonas Kolkka
- (Finland) Robin Lod

France

- (France) Dion
- (France) Dembla
- (France) (Poland) Daniel Foux
- (France) Alain Raguel
- (France) (Ivory Coast) (Guinea) Djibril Cissé
- (France) (Benin) Sidney Govou
- (France) (Mauritius) Damien Plessis
- (France) (Cameroon) Jean-Alain Boumsong
- (France) Anthony Mounier
- (France) (Italy) Yohan Mollo
- (France) Alexis Trouillet
- (France) (Mali) Moussa Sissoko
- (France) (Guinea) Etienne Camara
- (France) (Cameroon) Junior Njimbam

Gambia

- (The Gambia) (Sweden) Njogu Demba-Nyrén

Germany

- (Germany) Walter Wagner
- (Germany) Marco Villa
- (Germany) Karlheinz Pflipsen
- (Germany) Markus Münch
- (Germany) (Greece) Panagiotis Bartzokas
- (Germany) (Greece) Konstantinos Ipirotis
- (Germany) (Greece) Alexandros Pagalis
- (Germany) Jens Wemmer
- (Germany) (Greece) Giannis Tsingos
- (Germany) (Greece) Dimitris Kontogeorgis
- (Germany) Philipp Max

Ghana

- (Ghana) Derek Boateng
- (Ghana) Kwame Pele Frimpong
- (Ghana) (Netherlands) Quincy Owusu Abeyie
- (Ghana) (France) Michael Essien
- (Ghana) (Spain) Mubarak Wakaso

Greece

- (Greece) Alexis Alexoudis
- (Greece) Sotiris Alexandropoulos
- (Greece) Georgios Alexopoulos
- (Greece) Alexandros Anagnostopoulos
- (Greece) Angelos Anastasiadis
- (Greece) Vangelis Anastasopoulos
- (Greece) Kyriakos Andreopoulos
- (Greece) Sotiris Angelopoulos
- (Greece) Vasilios Angelopoulos
- (Greece) Antonis Antoniadis
- (Greece) Kostas Antoniou
- (Greece) Kostas Apostolakis
- (Greece) Stratos Apostolakis
- (Greece) Konstantinos Apostolopoulos
- (Greece) Achilleas Aslanidis
- (Greece) Andreas Athanasakopoulos
- (Greece) Anastasios Avlonitis
- (Greece) Anastasios Bakasetas
- (Greece) (England) George Baldock
- (Greece) Angelos Basinas
- (Greece) Christos Bourbos
- (Greece) Giannis Bouzoukis
- (Greece) (Albania) Adriano Bregou
- (Greece) Lazaros Christodoulopoulos
- (Greece) Anastasios Chatzigiovanis
- (Greece) (Kazakhstan) Ilias Chatzitheodoridis
- (Greece) Grigoris Charalampidis
- (Greece) Diamantis Chouchoumis
- (Greece) Nikos Christogeorgos
- (Greece) Georgios Delikaris
- (Greece) (Turkey) Lysandros Dikaiopoulos
- (Greece) Mitsos Dimitriou
- (Greece) Christos Dimopoulos
- (Greece) Thanasis Dimopoulos
- (Greece) (Albania) Elini Dimoutsos
- (Greece) Athanasios Dinas
- (Greece) Sokratis Dioudis
- (Greece) Mimis Domazos
- (Greece) Christos Donis
- (Greece) (Germany) Georgios Donis
- (Greece) Kostas Eleftherakis
- (Greece) Dimitrios Emmanouilidis
- (Greece) Stefanos Evangelou
- (Greece) Xenofon Fetsis
- (Greece) Totis Filakouris
- (Greece) Takis Fyssas
- (Greece) Kostas Frantzeskos
- (Greece) (Germany) Mike Galakos
- (Greece) Theofanis Gekas
- (Greece) Paris Georgakopoulos
- (Greece) Lysandros Georgamlis
- (Greece) (Romania) Dan Georgiadis
- (Greece) Georgios Georgiadis
- (Greece) (Germany) Georgios Savvas Georgiadis
- (Greece) Fotis Georgiou
- (Greece) Michalis Gerothodoros
- (Greece) Nikos Giannakopoulos
- (Greece) Nikos Giannitsanis
- (Greece) Xenofon Gittas
- (Greece) Giannis Goumas
- (Greece) Charis Grammos
- (Greece) Evangelos Ikonomou
- (Greece) Takis Ikonomopoulos
- (Greece) Georgios Ioannidis
- (Greece) Fotis Ioannidis
- (Greece) George Kalafatis
- (Greece) Ioannis Kalitzakis
- (Greece) Dimitrios Kalligeris
- (Greece) Nikos Kaltsas
- (Greece) Aristidis Kamaras
- (Greece) Argyris Kampetsis
- (Greece) Anthimos Kapsis
- (Greece) (Albania) Stefanos Kapino
- (Greece) Nikos Karageorgiou
- (Greece) Dimitrios Karagiannis
- (Greece) Giorgos Karagounis
- (Greece) Nikolaos Karelis
- (Greece) Nikos Karoulias
- (Greece) Kostas Katsouranis
- (Greece) Dimosthenis Kavouras
- (Greece) Kostas Kiassos
- (Greece) Thanasis Kolitsidakis
- (Greece) Dimitrios Kolovetsios
- (Greece) Dimitris Kolovos
- (Greece) (Germany) Alexandros Konstantinidis
- (Greece) (Germany) Kostas Konstantinidis
- (Greece) Pantelis Konstantinidis
- (Greece) Vasilis Konstantinou
- (Greece) Konstantinos Kotsaris
- (Greece) Giannis Kotsiras
- (Greece) Stefanos Kotsolis
- (Greece) Christos Kountouriotis
- (Greece) Sotiris Kontouris
- (Greece) Nikos Kourbanas
- (Greece) Dimitrios Kourbelis
- (Greece) Alexis Koutsias
- (Greece) Nikos Kourkoulos
- (Greece) Nikos Kousidis
- (Greece) Georgios Koutroumpis
- (Greece) Anastasios Kritikos
- (Greece) Christos Kryparakos
- (Greece) Ioannis Kyrastas
- (Greece) Giorgos Kyriakopoulos
- (Greece) Sotirios Kyrgiakos
- (Greece) Georgios Kyriopoulos
- (Greece) Anastasios Lagos
- (Greece) Lazaros Lamprou
- (Greece) Sotiris Leontiou
- (Greece) (Brazil) Dimitrios Limnios
- (Greece) Kostas Linoxilakis
- (Greece) Spyros Livathinos
- (Greece) Takis Loukanidis
- (Greece) Nikos Liberopoulos
- (Greece) (Germany) Giorgos Machlelis
- (Greece) Vangelis Mantzios
- (Greece) Spiros Marangos
- (Greece) Nikos Marinakis
- (Greece) Dimitris Markos
- (Greece) Charis Mavrias
- (Greece) Theofanis Mavrommatis
- (Greece) Christos Melissis
- (Greece) (South Africa) Angelos Messaris
- (Greece) (Albania) Theodoros Mingos
- (Greece) Antonis Minou
- (Greece) Tasos Mitropoulos
- (Greece) Victor Mitropoulos
- (Greece) Antonis Miyiakis
- (Greece) (England) Alexandros Mouzakitis
- (Greece) Georgios Nasiopoulos
- (Greece) Georgios Nikas
- (Greece) (Bulgaria) Apostolos Nikolaidis
- (Greece) Theofilaktos Nikolaidis
- (Greece) Antonis Nikopolidis
- (Greece) (Albania) Sotiris Ninis
- (Greece) Nikos Nioplias
- (Greece) Marinos Ouzounidis
- (Greece) Loukas Panourgias
- (Greece) Nikos Pantidos
- (Greece) Epaminondas Pantelakis
- (Greece) Pavlos Pantelidis
- (Greece) (Uzbekistan) Dimitrios Papadopoulos
- (Greece) (Turkey) Michalis Papazoglou
- (Greece) Lakis Petropoulos
- (Greece) Antonis Petropoulos
- (Greece) Achilleas Poungouras
- (Greece) Mimis Pierrakos
- (Greece) Sotiris-Pantelis Pispas
- (Greece) Minas Pitsos
- (Greece) Manolis Roubakis
- (Greece) Spyros Risvanis
- (Greece) Dimitris Salpingidis
- (Greece) (Australia) Giannis Samaras
- (Greece) Miltiadis Sapanis
- (Greece) Achilleas Sarakatsanos
- (Greece) Dimitris Saravakos
- (Greece) Nikos Sarganis
- (Greece) Dimitris Seitaridis
- (Greece) Giourkas Seitaridis
- (Greece) Dimitris Serpezis
- (Greece) Antonis Siatounis
- (Greece) Georgios Sideras
- (Greece) Georgios Sikalias
- (Greece) Georgios Simos
- (Greece) Stefanos Siontis
- (Greece) Manolis Siopis
- (Greece) Frangiskos Sourpis
- (Greece) Nikos Spyropoulos
- (Greece) Panagiotis Spyropoulos
- (Greece) Paschalis Staikos
- (Greece) Giannis Stamatakis
- (Greece) (United States) Alexandros Tabakis
- (Greece) Stathis Tavlaridis
- (Greece) Christos Terzanidis
- (Greece) (Ghana) Andrews Tetteh
- (Greece) Vangelis Theocharis
- (Greece) Ioannis Thomaidis
- (Greece) (Albania) Giannis Thomas
- (Greece) (Germany) Giorgos Theodoridis
- (Greece) Yiannis Tomaras
- (Greece) Alexandros Triantafyllopoulos
- (Greece) Konstantinos Triantafyllopoulos
- (Greece) Theodoros Tripotseris
- (Greece) Alexandros Tsemperidis
- (Greece) Athanasios Tsigas
- (Greece) Theofanis Tzandaris
- (Greece) Marios Tzavidas
- (Greece) Spyros Tzavidas
- (Greece) Alexandros Tziolis
- (Greece) Alexandros Tzorvas
- (Greece) Georgios Vagiannidis
- (Greece) Georgios Vakouftsis
- (Greece) Nikos Vamvakoulas
- (Greece) Christos Vasiliou
- (Greece) Markos Vellidis
- (Greece) Nikos Vergos
- (Greece) (Germany) Odysseas Vlachodimos
- (Greece) (Germany) Panagiotis Vlachodimos
- (Greece) Vangelis Vlachos
- (Greece) (New Zealand) Valentinos Vlachos
- (Greece) Leonidas Vokolos
- (Greece) (Poland) Giannis Vonortas
- (Greece) (Czech Republic) Loukas Vyntra
- (Greece) Vasilios Xenopoulos
- (Greece) Christos Yfantidis
- (Greece) Vasilis Zagaritis
- (Greece) Giannis Zaradoukas
- (Greece) (Portugal) Zeca

Guinea

- (Guinea) (Greece) Mamadou Diallo

Hungary

- (Hungary) Márton Esterházy
- (Hungary) Josef Fitos
- (Hungary) Sándor Torghelle
- (Hungary) Gergely Rudolf
- (Hungary) Dominik Nagy
- (Hungary) László Kleinheisler

Iceland

- (Iceland) Helgi Sigurðsson
- (Iceland) Hörður Björgvin Magnússon
- (Iceland) Sverrir Ingi Ingason

Israel

- (Israel) (Spain) Nir Mansour
- (Israel) (Hungary) Omri Altman

Italy

- (Italy) Alessandro Beni
- (Italy) Giandomenico Mesto
- (Italy) (Argentina) Cristian Ledesma
- (Italy) Federico Macheda
- (Italy) (Ivory Coast) Christian Konan
- (Italy) Alberto Brignoli
- (Italy) Matteo Colombo
- (Italy) Felice Cirillo
- (Italy) (Brazil) Cleo Caoua
- (Italy) Davide Calabria

Ivory Coast

- (Ivory Coast) Ibrahim Sissoko
- (Ivory Coast) (France) (Burkina Faso) Alban Lafont

Japan

- (Japan) Yōhei Kajiyama

Kenya

- (Kenya) Mohamed Katana

Lithuania

- (Lithuania) Raimondas Žutautas

Mali

- (Mali) (France) Cédric Kanté
- (Mali) (France) Ousmane Coulibaly
- (Mali) (France) Yacouba Sylla

Morocco

- (Morocco) (Netherlands) Ouasim Bouy
- (Morocco) (Spain) Anuar Tuhami
- (Morocco) (Netherlands) Yassin Ayoub
- (Morocco) Azzedine Ounahi
- (Morocco) (Belgium) Anass Zaroury
- (Morocco) (France) Imran Louza
- (Morocco) (Netherlands) Anass Salah-Eddine

Mozambique

- (Mozambique) Simão Mate Junior

Netherlands

- (Netherlands) Boudewijn de Geer
- (Netherlands) (China) Tschen La Ling
- (Netherlands) (Suriname) Nordin Wooter
- (Netherlands) Nicky Kuiper
- (Netherlands) (Cape Verde) David Mendes da Silva
- (Netherlands) (Greece) Mark Sifneos
- (Netherlands) Bart Schenkeveld
- (Netherlands) (Angola) Tonny Vilhena
- (Netherlands) Stefan de Vrij
- (Netherlands) Rick van Drongelen

New Zealand

- (New Zealand) (Greece) Kosta Barbarouses

Nigeria

- (Nigeria) (Poland) Emmanuel Olisadebe
- (Nigeria) Joseph Enakarhire
- (Nigeria) Abdul Jeleel Ajagun
- (Nigeria) (Belgium) Cyriel Dessers

North Macedonia

- (North Macedonia) (Switzerland) Elmin Rastoder

Norway

- (Norway) Arne Dokken
- (Norway) Erik Mykland
- (Norway) Frank Strandli
- (Norway) (Pakistan) Ghayas Zahid

Palestine

- (Palestine) (Greece) Odai Al-Nasaseebi

Paraguay

- (Paraguay) Severiano Irala
- (Paraguay) José Ivaldi
- (Paraguay) (Spain) Marcelo Casas

Peru

- (Peru) Percy Olivares
- (Peru) Juan José Oré

Poland

- (Poland) Maciej Bykowski
- (Poland) Bartłomiej Drągowski
- (Poland) Marcin Juszczak
- (Poland) Michał Koj
- (Poland) Arkadiusz Malarz
- (Poland) Ksawier Popiela
- (Poland) Tymoteusz Puchacz
- (Poland) Karol Świderski
- (Poland) Igor Sypniewski
- (Poland) Józef Wandzik
- (Poland) (Greece) Krzysztof Warzycha
- (Poland) Jakub Wawrzyniak
- (Poland) Rafał Zawisłan

Portugal

- (Portugal) (Angola) Carlos Chainho
- (Portugal) (Canada) Daniel Fernandes
- (Portugal) João Nunes
- (Portugal) André Almeida Pinto
- (Portugal) Hélder Postiga
- (Portugal) (São Tomé and Príncipe) Renato Sanches
- (Portugal) Paulo Sousa
- (Portugal) Miguel Tavares
- (Portugal) (Switzerland) Nuno Reis
- (Portugal) António Xavier

Romania

- (Romania) (Greece) Constantin Deleanu
- (Romania) (Spain) Cristian Ganea
- (Romania) Erik Lincar
- (Romania) Dănuţ Lupu
- (Romania) (Croatia) Dumitru Mitu
- (Romania) Doru Nicolae
- (Romania) Lucian Sânmărtean
- (Romania) (Greece) Theodoros Tsili

Russia

- (Russia) (Greece) Yuri Lodygin
- (Russia) (England) Moris Nusuev

Senegal

- (Senegal) Dame N'Doye
- (Senegal) (France) Pape Habib Sow
- (Senegal) (France) Younousse Sankharé
- (Senegal) (France) Cheikh Niasse

Serbia

- (Serbia) Nikola Budišić
- (Serbia) Borivoje Đorđević
- (Serbia) Filip Đuričić
- (Serbia) (Bosnia and Herzegovina) Mijat Gaćinović
- (Serbia) Nemanja Maksimović
- (Serbia) (Greece) Vladan Milojević
- (Serbia) Filip Mladenović
- (Serbia) Miloš Pantović

Slovenia

- (Slovenia) Adam Gnezda Čerin
- (Slovenia) Andraž Šporar
- (Slovenia) Benjamin Verbič

South Africa

- (South Africa) Bryce Moon
- (South Africa) Nasief Morris

Spain

- (Spain) Aitor Cantalapiedra
- (Spain) Antoñito
- (Spain) Carlitos
- (Spain) Pedro Chirivella
- (Spain) Jokin Esparza
- (Spain) Juankar
- (Spain) Luis García
- (Spain) Javi Hernández
- (Spain) Nano
- (Spain) Iñaki Peña
- (Spain) Rubén Pérez
- (Spain) Sergio Sánchez
- (Spain) Víctor Sánchez
- (Spain) Josu Sarriegi
- (Spain) Toché
- (Spain) Fausto Tienza
- (Spain) Fran Vélez
- (Spain) Vitolo

Sweden

- (Sweden) Mikael Antonsson
- (Sweden) Mattias Bjärsmyr
- (Sweden) (Kosovo) Emir Bajrami
- (Sweden) Marcus Berg
- (Sweden) (Kosovo) Valmir Berisha
- (Sweden) Oscar Hiljemark
- (Sweden) Niklas Hult
- (Sweden) (Russia) Alexander Jeremejeff
- (Sweden) Mattias Johansson
- (Sweden) (Nicaragua) Ramon Pascal Lundqvist
- (Sweden) (Uruguay) Guillermo Molins
- (Sweden) Mikael Nilsson

Trinidad and Tobago

- (Trinidad and Tobago) Levi García

Turkey

- (Turkey) Samet Akaydin
- (Turkey) (Greece) Nikos Kovis

United States

- (United States) Erik Palmer-Brown

Uruguay

- (Uruguay) (Greece) Carlos Linaris
- (Uruguay) (Australia) (Italy) Bruno Fornaroli
- (Uruguay) Adrián Balboa
- (Uruguay) (Spain) (Italy) Facundo Pellistri

Uzbekistan

- (Uzbekistan) Jafar Irismetov

Venezuela

- (Venezuela) (Brazil) Arnout de Melo
- (Venezuela) (Italy) José Manuel Velázquez

Zambia

- (Zambia) Kings Kangwa
