= 2020–21 Panathinaikos F.C. season =

Panathinaikos
2020–21 season
- Chairman: Manos Mavrokoukoulakis
- Manager: Dani Poyatos (until 11 October); Sotiris Sylaidopoulos (caretaker, from 12 October to 19 October); László Bölöni (from 19 October to 10 May); Sotiris Sylaidopoulos (caretaker, from 11 May to 16 May)
- Stadium: Leoforos Alexandras Stadium; Athens Olympic Stadium
- Super League: 5th
- Greek Cup: Quarter-finals
- Top goalscorer: League: Federico Macheda (9 goals); All: Federico Macheda (10 goals)
Home colours	Away colours	Third colours

The 2020–21 Panathinaikos season was the club's 62nd consecutive season in Super League Greece. They also competed in the Greek Cup, falling in the quarter-final stage to PAS Giannina.

== Players ==
No.	Name	Nationality	Position (s)	Date of birth (age)	Signed from	Notes
Goalkeepers
1	Sokratis Dioudis	(Greece)	GK	3 February 1993 (age 33)	(Greece) Aris Thessaloniki	
15	Vasilios Xenopoulos	(Greece)	GK	20 April 1998 (age 28)	Youth system	
61	Christos Chatzigiannakis	(Greece)	GK	9 March 2002 (age 24)	Youth system	
68	Nikos Christogeorgos	(Greece)	GK	18 January 2000 (age 26)	Youth system	
Defenders
3	Juankar	(Spain)	LB / LM	30 March 1990 (age 36)	(Spain) Málaga	
4	Fran Vélez	(Spain)	CB	23 June 1991 (age 35)	(Greece) Aris Thessaloniki	
5	Bart Schenkeveld	(Netherlands)	CB	28 August 1991 (age 35)	(Australia) Melbourne City	
12	Ilias Chatzitheodoridis	(Greece)	LB / LM	5 December 1997 (age 28)	(England) Brentford	
14	Facundo Sánchez	(Argentina)	RB	7 March 1990 (age 36)	(Argentina) Estudiantes	
38	Dimitris Karagiannis	(Greece)	CB	27 February 2001 (age 25)	Youth system	
44	Achilleas Poungouras	(Greece)	CB	13 December 1995 (age 30)	(Greece) PAOK	
58	Yohan Mollo	(France)	RW / LW / RB	18 July 1989 (age 37)	(France) Sochaux	
77	Spyros Tzavidas	(Greece)	RW / LW / RB	21 August 2001 (age 25)	Youth system	
Midfielders
6	Younousse Sankharé	(Senegal)	MF / DM	10 March 1989 (age 37)	(Bulgaria) CSKA Sofia	
7	António Xavier	(Portugal)	RW	6 July 1992 (age 34)	(Portugal) Tondela	
8	Yassin Ayoub	(Morocco)	MF	6 March 1994 (age 32)	(Netherlands) Feyenoord	
11	Anastasios Chatzigiovanis	(Greece)	RW / LW	31 May 1997 (age 29)	Youth system	
17	Cheikh Niasse	(Senegal)	DM / CB	19 January 2000 (age 26)	(France) Lille	On loan
18	Giannis Bouzoukis	(Greece)	MF / RW	27 March 1998 (age 28)	Youth system	
19	Lucas Villafáñez	(Argentina)	MF / RW	4 October 1991 (age 34)	(Mexico) Atlético Morelia	
20	Dimitris Serpezis	(Greece)	MF	14 March 2001 (age 25)	Youth system	
21	Dimitrios Kourbelis	(Greece)	DM / CB	2 October 1993 (age 32)	(Greece) Asteras Tripolis	
22	Aitor Cantalapiedra	(Spain)	RW / LW	10 February 1996 (age 30)	(Netherlands) Twente	
23	Yeni Ngbakoto	(Democratic Republic of the Congo)	RW / LW	23 January 1992 (age 34)	(France) Guingamp	
37	Andreas Athanasakopoulos	(Greece)	MF	27 November 2001 (age 24)	Youth system	
55	Sotiris Alexandropoulos	(Greece)	DM / MF	26 November 2001 (age 24)	Youth system	
57	Uffe Bech	(Denmark)	RW / LW	13 January 1993 (age 33)	(Germany) Hannover 96	
88	Maurício	(Brazil)	MF	21 October 1988 (age 37)	(Greece) PAOK	
Forwards
9	Federico Macheda	(Italy)	CF	22 August 1991 (age 35)	(Italy) Novara	
10	Carlitos	(Spain)	CF	12 June 1990 (age 36)	(United Arab Emirates) Al Wahda	
27	Fotis Ioannidis	(Greece)	CF	10 January 2000 (age 26)	(Greece) Levadiakos	
99	Argyris Kampetsis	(Greece)	CF	6 May 1999 (age 27)	(Germany) Borussia Dortmund II	

== Transfers ==
=== Summer window ===
==== In ====
Squad #	Position	Player	Transferred From	Fee	Date	Ref
22	MF	(Spain) Aitor Cantalapiedra	(Netherlands) Twente	Free	24 June 2020	
4	DF	(Spain) Fran Vélez	(Greece) Aris Thessaloniki	Free	7 July 2020	
7	MF	(Portugal) António Xavier	(Portugal) Tondela	Free	30 July 2020	
19	MF	(Argentina) Lucas Villafáñez	(Mexico) Atlético Morelia	Free	6 August 2020	
27	FW	(Greece) Fotis Ioannidis	(Greece) Levadiakos	€60,000	10 August 2020	
14	DF	(Argentina) Facundo Sánchez	(Argentina) Estudiantes	Free	23 August 2020	
3	DF	(Spain) Juankar	(Spain) Málaga	Free	9 September 2020	
16	DF	(Spain) Antoñito	(Spain) Real Valladolid	Free	26 September 2020	
88	MF	(Brazil) Maurício	(Greece) PAOK	Free	11 October 2020	

==== Loan returns ====
Squad #	Position	Player	Transferred From	Fee	Date	Ref
	MF	(Greece) Dimos Chantzaras	(Greece) Veria	Loan return	1 July 2020	
	MF	(Greece) Adriano Skenderaj	(Greece) Ethnikos Piraeus	Loan return	1 July 2020	
24	DF	(Greece) Theofanis Mavrommatis	(Denmark) SønderjyskE	Loan return	1 July 2020	
54	FW	(Greece) Kristo Shehu	(Italy) Bologna	Loan return	1 July 2020	
6	MF	(Spain) Fausto Tienza	(Spain) Gimnàstic	Loan return	1 July 2020	
20	FW	(Greece) Nikos Vergos	(Spain) Hércules	Loan return	1 July 2020	
	DF	(Greece) Thanasis Dimitroulas	(Greece) Thesprotos	Loan return	1 July 2020	
17	MF	(Greece) Dimitrios Emmanouilidis	(Greece) Panionios	Loan return	1 July 2020	
29	FW	(Netherlands) Mark Sifneos	(Greece) Apollon Larissa	Loan return	1 July 2020	
58	DF	(France) Yohan Mollo	(France) Orléans	Loan return	1 July 2020	
59	FW	(Italy) Christian Konan	(Greece) Levadiakos	Loan return	1 July 2020	

==== Out ====
Squad #	Position	Player	Transferred To	Fee	Date	Ref
10	MF	(Norway) Ghayas Zahid	(Cyprus) APOEL	End of loan	30 June 2020	
57	DF	(Greece) Georgios Vagiannidis	(Italy) Inter Milan	End of contract	30 June 2020	
3	DF	(Argentina) Emanuel Insúa	(Greece) AEK Athens	End of contract	30 June 2020	
2	DF	(Sweden) Mattias Johansson	(Turkey) Gençlerbirliği	End of contract	30 June 2020	
16	DF	(Greece) Kostas Apostolakis	(Cyprus) APOEL	End of contract	30 June 2020	
8	MF	(Greece) Christos Donis	(Italy) Ascoli	End of contract	30 June 2020	
30	DF	(Portugal) João Nunes	(Hungary) Puskás Akadémia	€200,000	1 July 2020	
29	FW	(Netherlands) Mark Sifneos	(Switzerland) Chiasso	Free	17 July 2020	
26	MF	(Morocco) Anuar Tuhami	(Spain) Real Valladolid	End of loan	31 July 2020	
22	MF	(Hungary) Dominik Nagy	(Poland) Legia Warsaw	End of loan	31 July 2020	
20	FW	(Greece) Nikos Vergos	(Greece) Panetolikos	Free	4 August 2020	
	DF	(Greece) Thanasis Dimitroulas	(Greece) Diagoras	Free	20 August 2020	
27	GK	(Greece) Konstantinos Kotsaris	(Greece) Apollon Smyrnis	Free	14 September 2020	
4	DF	(Greece) Dimitrios Kolovetsios	(Turkey) Kayserispor	Free	15 September 2020	
	MF	(Greece) Dimos Chantzaras	(Greece) Pierikos	Free	24 September 2020	

==== Loans out ====
Squad #	Position	Player	Transferred To	Fee	Date	Ref
6	MF	(Spain) Fausto Tienza	(Spain) Gimnàstic	Loan	10 August 2020	
19	FW	(Colombia) Juan José Perea	(Greece) Volos	Loan	2 September 2020	
7	MF	(Greece) Dimitris Kolovos	(Moldova) Sheriff Tiraspol	Loan	11 September 2020	
23	DF	(Greece) Vangelis Theocharis	(Greece) Levadiakos	Loan	16 September 2020	

=== Winter window ===
==== In ====
Squad #	Position	Player	Transferred From	Fee	Date	Ref
6	MF	(Senegal) Younousse Sankharé	(Bulgaria) CSKA Sofia	€250,000	31 January 2021	
23	MF	(Democratic Republic of the Congo) Yeni Ngbakoto	(France) Guingamp	Free	1 February 2021	

==== Loans in ====
Squad #	Position	Player	Transferred To	Fee	Date	Ref
17	MF	(Senegal) Cheikh Niasse	(France) Lille	Loan	1 February 2021	

==== Out ====
Squad #	Position	Player	Transferred To	Fee	Date	Ref
16	DF	(Spain) Antoñito	(Spain) Cartagena	Free	19 January 2021	
47	DF	(Greece) Vasilis Zagaritis	(Italy) Parma	€380,000	22 January 2021	
24	DF	(Greece) Theofanis Mavrommatis	(Greece) Atromitos	Free	31 January 2021	
59	FW	(Italy) Christian Konan	(Spain) Logroñés B	Free	3 February 2021	
54	FW	(Albania) Kristo Shehu	(Greece) Apollon Larissa	Free	18 February 2021	

==== Loans out ====
Squad #	Position	Player	Transferred To	Fee	Date	Ref
17	FW	(Greece) Dimitrios Emmanouilidis	(Netherlands) Fortuna Sittard	Loan	22 January 2021	

== Pre-season and friendlies ==
22 August 2020 Friendly	Panathinaikos	3–0	Marko	Koropi, Greece
18:30	Macheda 4'; Xavier 37'; Tzavidas 64'	Report		Stadium: Georgios Kalafatis Sports Center

26 August 2020 Friendly	Panathinaikos	1–0	OFI	Athens, Greece
21:00	Macheda 41'	Report		Stadium: Olympic Stadium

29 August 2020 Friendly	Panathinaikos	0–1	Lamia	Koropi, Greece
19:30		Report	Kostikas 85' (pen.)	Stadium: Georgios Kalafatis Sports Center

5 September 2020 Friendly	Panathinaikos	0–1	PAOK	Athens, Greece
19:00		Report	Akpom 40'	Stadium: Grigoris Lambrakis Stadium

19 September 2020 Friendly	Panathinaikos	1–0	Levadiakos	Athens, Greece
18:30	Macheda 58' (pen.)	Report		Stadium: Grigoris Lambrakis Stadium

== Competitions ==
=== Super League Greece ===
==== Regular season ====
===== League table =====
Pos	Team	Pld	W	D	L	GF	GA	GD	Pts	Qualification
3	AEK Athens	26	14	6	6	41	29	+12	48	Qualification for the Play-off round
4	PAOK	26	13	8	5	49	26	+23	47	Qualification for the Play-off round
5	Panathinaikos	26	13	6	7	30	19	+11	45	Qualification for the Play-off round
6	Asteras Tripolis	26	11	9	6	27	25	+2	42	Qualification for the Play-off round
7	Volos	26	8	9	9	26	32	−6	33	Qualification for the Play-out round

Source: Super League Greece
Rules for classification: 1) Points; 2) Head-to-head points; 3) Head-to-head goal difference; 4) Goals scored; 5) Goals against.

===== Matches =====
13 September 2020 1	Asteras Tripolis	1–0	Panathinaikos	Tripoli
20:30	Riera 73'	Report		Stadium: Theodoros Kolokotronis Stadium; Referee: Anastasios Sidiropoulos

28 September 2020 3	AEL	1–1	Panathinaikos	Larissa
19:30	Pinakas 87'	Report	Macheda 26'	Stadium: Alcazar Stadium; Referee: Anastasios Papapetrou

4 October 2020 4	Panathinaikos	0–1	Aris	Athens
16:00		Report	Mancini 25'	Stadium: Olympic Stadium; Referee: Petros Tsagkarakis

18 October 2020 5	OFI	2–2	Panathinaikos	Heraklion
16:00	Sturgeon 37'; Mellado 77'	Report	Carlitos 49'; Macheda 90+4'	Stadium: Theodoros Vardinogiannis Stadium; Referee: Vasilios Fotias

24 October 2020 6	Panathinaikos	1–1	Volos	Athens
20:30	Carlitos 56'	Report	Bartolo 90+2'	Stadium: Olympic Stadium; Referee: Anastasios Papapetrou

31 October 2020 7	Lamia	0–2	Panathinaikos	Lamia
19:30		Report	Carlitos 8', 60'	Stadium: Lamia Municipal Stadium; Referee: Ioannis Papadopoulos

3 November 2020 2	Panathinaikos	1–0	Apollon Smyrnis	Athens
17:15	Chatzigiovanis 27' (pen.)	Report		Stadium: Olympic Stadium; Referee: Stefanos Koubarakis

7 November 2020 8	Panathinaikos	0–1	Atromitos	Athens
19:30		Report	Christodoulopoulos 88'	Stadium: Olympic Stadium; Referee: Petros Tsagarakis

21 November 2020 9	Olympiacos	1–0	Panathinaikos	Piraeus
19:30	Fortounis 27' (pen.)	Report		Stadium: Karaiskakis Stadium; Referee: Artur Soares Dias

29 November 2020 10	Panathinaikos	2–1	Panetolikos	Athens
15:00	Macheda 19'; Liavas 43' (o.g.)	Report	Mendoza 90+5' (pen.)	Stadium: Olympic Stadium; Referee: Aristotelis Diamantopoulos

6 December 2020 11	AEK Athens	1–2	Panathinaikos	Athens
19:30	Oliveira 87'	Report	Macheda; 45+2' Kourbelis	Stadium: Olympic Stadium 33'; Referee: Irfan Peljto

12 December 2020 12	Panathinaikos	2–0	PAS Giannina	Athens
19:30	Villafáñez 33'; Aitor 59'	Report		Stadium: Leoforos Alexandras Stadium; Referee: Ioannis Papadopoulos

20 December 2020 13	PAOK	2–1	Panathinaikos	Thessaloniki
19:30	Ingason 11'; Świderski 65'	Report	Aitor 16'	Stadium: Toumba Stadium; Referee: Tamás Bognár

3 January 2021 14	Panathinaikos	0–0	Asteras Tripolis	Athens
15:00		Report		Stadium: Leoforos Alexandras Stadium; Referee: Athanassios Tzilos

6 January 2021 15	Apollon Smyrnis	0–1	Panathinaikos	Athens
15:00		Report	Ioannidis 16'	Stadium: Georgios Kamaras Stadium; Referee: Aristomenis Koutsiaftis

10 January 2021 16	Panathinaikos	2–0	AEL	Athens
19:30	Carlitos 36'; Emmanouilidis 90+4'	Report		Stadium: Leoforos Alexandras Stadium; Referee: Ioannis Papadopoulos

17 January 2021 17	Aris	0–1	Panathinaikos	Thessaloniki
19:30		Report	Kampetsis 9'	Stadium: Kleanthis Vikelidis Stadium; Referee: Anastasios Sidiropoulos

23 January 2021 18	Panathinaikos	2–0	OFI	Athens
19:30	Schenkeveld 32'; Kampetsis 86'	Report		Stadium: Leoforos Alexandras Stadium; Referee: Dimitrios Karantonis

27 January 2021 19	Volos	0–2	Panathinaikos	Volos
15:00		Report	Kampetsis 42'; Ioannidis 65'	Stadium: Panthessaliko Stadium; Referee: Angelos Evangelou

30 January 2021 20	Panathinaikos	0–0	Lamia	Athens
19:30		Report		Stadium: Leoforos Alexandras Stadium; Referee: Athanasios Tzilos

6 February 2021 21	Atromitos	2–3	Panathinaikos	Athens
19:30	Goutas 45+1'; Agayev 54'	Report	Vélez 10'; Carlitos 48'; Sankharé 84'	Stadium: Peristeri Stadium; Referee: Anastasios Sidiropoulos

14 February 2021 22	Panathinaikos	2–1	Olympiacos	Athens
19:30	Mauricio 6'; Sankharé 73'	Report	El-Arabi 82'	Stadium: Leoforos Alexandras Stadium; Referee: Robert Madden

22 February 2021 23	Panetolikos	1–0	Panathinaikos	Agrinio
19:30	N'Dinga 6'	Report		Stadium: Panetolikos Stadium; Referee: Ioannis Papadopoulos

28 February 2021 24	Panathinaikos	1–1	AEK Athens	Athens
19:30	Vélez 58'	Report	L. García 82'	Stadium: Leoforos Alexandras Stadium; Referee: Giorgi Kabakov

6 March 2021 25	PAS Giannina	1–0	Panathinaikos	Ioannina
19:30	Milinceanu 19'	Report		Stadium: Zosimades Stadium; Referee: Aristotelis Diamantopoulos

14 March 2021 26	Panathinaikos	2–1	PAOK	Athens
19:30	Macheda 39'; Ioannidis 84'	Report	Krmenčík 84'	Stadium: Leoforos Alexandras Stadium; Referee: Nathan Verboomen

==== Play-off round ====
Pos	Team	Pld	W	D	L	GF	GA	GD	Pts	Qualification
1	Olympiacos (C)	36	28	6	2	82	19	+63	90	Qualification for the Champions League second qualifying round
2	PAOK	36	18	10	8	60	34	+26	64	Qualification for the Europa Conference League third qualifying round (Note: PAOK qualified for the Europa Conference League third qualifying round by winning the Greek Cup.)
3	Aris	36	17	10	9	41	26	+15	61	Qualification for the Europa Conference League second qualifying round
4	AEK Athens	36	17	9	10	53	45	+8	60	Qualification for the Europa Conference League second qualifying round
5	Panathinaikos	36	14	11	11	41	34	+7	53	
6	Asteras Tripolis	36	12	15	9	36	38	−2	51	

Source: Super League Greece
Rules for classification: 1) Points; 2) Head-to-head points (Regular season and play-off); 3) Head-to-head goal difference (Regular season and play-off); 4) Regular season position.
(C) Champions
Notes:

21 March 2021 1	Asteras Tripolis	2–2	Panathinaikos	Tripoli
18:00	Fernández 84'; Papadopoulos 90+7'	Report	Macheda 58', 59'	Stadium: Theodoros Kolokotronis Stadium; Referee: Antonio Nobre

4 April 2021 2	Panathinaikos	3–0	PAOK	Athens
15:00	Macheda 39'; Villafáñez 79'; Aitor 85'	Report		Stadium: Leoforos Alexandras Stadium; Referee: Aliyar Aghayev

11 April 2021 3	Olympiacos	3–1	Panathinaikos	Piraeus
19:30	Hassan 45+3', 72'; Bruma 90+7'	Report	Macheda 39'	Stadium: Karaiskakis Stadium; Referee: Ivan Bebek

18 April 2021 4	Panathinaikos	1–2	Aris	Athens
15:00	Sankharé 31'	Report	Manos 62'; M. García 65'	Stadium: Leoforos Alexandras Stadium; Referee: Kristo Tohver

21 April 2021 5	AEK Athens	1–1	Panathinaikos	Athens
21:30	L. García 90+2'	Report	Ioannidis 36'	Stadium: Olympic Stadium; Referee: Dennis Higler

25 April 2021 6	PAOK	0–0	Panathinaikos	Thessaloniki
15:00		Report		Stadium: Toumba Stadium; Referee: Matias Gestranius

5 May 2021 7	Panathinaikos	2–2	Asteras Tripolis	Athens
19:30	Chatzigiovanis 28', 53'	Report	Suárez 10'; Barrales 42'	Stadium: Leoforos Alexandras Stadium; Referee: Efstathios Gortsilas

9 May 2021 8	Panathinaikos	0–1	AEK Athens	Athens
19:30		Report	Mantalos 50'	Stadium: Leoforos Alexandras Stadium; Referee: Yavhenii Aranovkyi

12 May 2021 9	Aris	0–0	Panathinaikos	Thessaloniki
19:30		Report		Stadium: Kleanthis Vikelidis Stadium; Referee: Istvan Vad

16 May 2021 10	Panathinaikos	1–4	Olympiacos	Athens
19:30	Mauricio 53'	Report	Masouras 7', 12'; El-Arabi 38', 72'	Stadium: Leoforos Alexandras Stadium; Referee: Andreas Ekberg

=== Greek Football Cup ===
==== Quarter-finals ====
18 February 2021 First leg	PAS Giannina	2–1	Panathinaikos	Agrinio
15:00	Pamlidis 21'; Kargas 66'	Report	Macheda 2'	Stadium: Panetolikos Stadium; Referee: Athanasios Tzilos
Note: The match took place at Panetolikos Stadium due to the inappropriateness of the Zosimades Stadium.

2 March 2021 Second leg	Panathinaikos	1–2 (2–4 agg.)	PAS Giannina	Athens
16:00	Poungouras 74'	Report	Pantelakis 2'; Chatzitheodoridis 9' (o.g.)	Stadium: Leoforos Alexandras Stadium; Referee: Kirill Levnikov
