= Tzavidas =

Tzavidas is a surname. Notable people with the surname include:

- Marios Tzavidas (born 2003), former Greek footballer
- Spyros Tzavidas (born 2001), former Greek footballer
