= 2008–09 Panathinaikos F.C. season =

Panathinaikos
2008–09 season
- Chairman: Nikos Pateras
- Manager: Henk ten Cate
- Ground: Athens Olympic Stadium
- Super League Greece: 2nd
- Greek Cup: Quarter-finals
- Champions League: Round of 16
- Top goalscorer: League: Dimitris Salpingidis (12); All: Dimitris Salpingidis (15)
- Highest home attendance: 60,616 vs Villarreal (10 March 2009)
- Lowest home attendance: 6,190 vs Skoda Xanthi (5 April 2009)
- Average home league attendance: 27,434
Home colours	Away colours	Third colours

The 2008–09 season is Panathinaikos' 50th consecutive season in the Super League Greece. They have qualified for the UEFA Champions League second qualifying round for the 2008–09 season. The 2007–08 season ended with Jose Peseiro's removal from the team's bench. After a year's absence they will return to Athens Olympic Stadium for the season. On 27 May 2008 after two hours of conversations between Panathinaikos chairmen, it was decided that Nikos Pateras would take over as Panathinaikos president. On 13 June 2008 Panathinaikos announced that the new team coach will be Henk ten Cate for the next two years.

== Players ==
=== First-team squad ===
Squad at end of season

Note: Flags indicate national team as defined under FIFA eligibility rules; some limited exceptions apply. Players may hold more than one non-FIFA nationality.

No.	Pos.	Nation	Player
1	GK	CRO	Mario Galinović
2	DF	RSA	Bryce Moon
3	DF	ESP	Josu Sarriegi
4	MF	BRA	Marcelo Mattos
5	FW	CRO	Ante Rukavina
6	DF	GRE	Christos Melissis
7	MF	GRE	Sotiris Ninis
8	DF	GRE	Giannis Goumas (vice-captain)
9	FW	BRA	Souza
10	MF	BRA	Silva Cleyton
11	FW	SEN	Dame N'Doye
12	DF	BRA	David
14	FW	GRE	Dimitris Salpingidis (vice-captain)
15	MF	BRA	Gilberto Silva
16	DF	RSA	Nasief Morris
17	MF	GRE	Lazaros Christodoulopoulos

No.	Pos.	Nation	Player
18	GK	POL	Arkadiusz Malarz
19	DF	BRA	Gabriel
20	MF	GRE	Sotiris Leontiou
21	MF	GRE	Giorgos Karagounis (captain)
22	MF	GRE	Alexandros Tziolis
23	MF	MOZ	Mate Junior Simao
24	DF	GRE	Loukas Vyntra
25	DF	POL	Jakub Wawrzyniak
26	FW	GRE	Evangelos Mantzios
27	MF	AUT	Andreas Ivanschitz
28	FW	GRE	Antonis Petropoulos
29	DF	SWE	Mikael Nilsson
30	GK	GRE	Alexandros Tzorvas
31	DF	GRE	Nikos Spiropoulos
32	DF	GRE	Nikos Pantidos
33	GK	GRE	Orestis Karnezis

== Squad changes for 2008/09 season ==
In: Note: Flags indicate national team as defined under FIFA eligibility rules; some limited exceptions apply. Players may hold more than one non-FIFA nationality.

No.	Pos.	Nation	Player
15	MF	BRA	Gilberto Silva (from Arsenal) For £1,000,000
9	FW	BRA	Souza (from Flamengo) For €3,000,000
19	DF	BRA	Gabriel (from Fluminense) For €1,500,000
4	MF	BRA	Marcelo Mattos (from Corinthians) For €3,800,000 for player's rights
5	FW	CRO	Ante Rukavina (from Hajduk Split) For €2,300,000
11	FW	GRE	Lazaros Christodoulopoulos (from PAOK FC) For €2,200,000
6	DF	GRE	Christos Melissis (from PAOK FC) For €2,000,000
27	MF	AUT	Andreas Ivanschitz (from Red Bull Salzburg) For €1,500,000 for player's rights
10	MF	BRA	Alexandre Silva Cleyton (from AEL) For €1,500,000
2	MF	RSA	Bryce Moon (from Ajax Cape Town) For €625,000
28	FW	GRE	Antonis Petropoulos (return loan from OFI) for €300,000
26	FW	GRE	Evangelos Mantzios (return loan from Eintracht Frankfurt)
16	MF	GRE	Stefanos Siontis (return loan from Kerkyra)
12	DF	BRA	David (Free Transfer)
25	DF	POL	Jakub Wawrzyniak (From Legia Warszawa for 1,500,000)

total spending : €21,225,000 ▼

Out: Note: Flags indicate national team as defined under FIFA eligibility rules; some limited exceptions apply. Players may hold more than one non-FIFA nationality.

No.	Pos.	Nation	Player
—	DF	GRE	Takis Fyssas (Retired)
—	FW	POR	Hélder Postiga (to Sporting CP)
—	MF	ARG	Sebastián Romero (to Gimnasia de La Plata)
—	MF	ARG	Ezequiel Gonzalez (to Rosario Central)
—	FW	ANG	Manucho (loan return to Manchester United)
—	DF	CRO	Anthony Šerić (to Beşiktaş)
—	FW	GRE	Athanasios Tsigas (to AEL)
—	FW	GRE	Dimitrios Papadopoulos ("Released")
—	FW	BRA	Souza (to Corinthians) for €1,500,000

Out on loan: Note: Flags indicate national team as defined under FIFA eligibility rules; some limited exceptions apply. Players may hold more than one non-FIFA nationality.

No.	Pos.	Nation	Player
—	DF	RSA	Nasief Morris (on loan to Recreativo de Huelva)
—	MF	GRE	Elini Dimoutsos (on loan to OFI)
—	FW	SEN	Dame N'Doye (on loan to OFI)
—	DF	GRE	Avgerinos Katranas (on loan to Panetolikos F.C.)
—	DF	GRE	Giannis Stathis (on loan to Ilisiakos F.C.)
—	DF	GRE	Alexandros Pagalis (on loan to Fostiras F.C.)
—	GK	POL	Arkadiusz Malarz (on loan to OFI)
—	DF	GRE	Nikos Boutzikos (on loan to Kerkyra)
—	GK	GRE	Michalis Vellidis (on loan to Diagoras F.C.)
—	GK	GRE	Petros Kravaritis (on loan to Koropi F.C.)
—	MF	ALB	Georgi Tsitsi (on loan to Koropi F.C.)
—	DF	GRE	Alexandros Konstantidis (on loan to Koropi F.C.)
—	DF	GRE	Giannis Zaradoukas (on loan to Ethnikos Piraeus F.C.)
—	MF	GRE	Alexandros Tziolis (on loan to Werder Bremen)
—	DF	GRE	Stefanos Siontis (on loan to Kavala)

== Club ==
=== Management ===
Position	Staff
Team manager	(Greece) Grigoris Papavasiliou
Manager	(Netherlands) Henk ten Cate
Assistant manager	(Greece) Yannis Anastasiou
Coach	(Netherlands) Gerard van der Lem
Coach	(Netherlands) Mike Snoei
Fitness coach	(Netherlands) Laurens Ebben
Goalkeeping coach	(Greece) Vasilis Alexoudis
Team doctor	(Greece) Panagiotis Kouloumentas

Last updated: 19 Jule 2008
Source: pao.gr

=== Other information ===
Chairman	(Greece) Nikos Pateras
Ground (capacity and dimensions)	Athens Olympic Stadium (71,030 / 120x80 m)

Source: pao.gr

== Pre-season and friendlies ==
9 July 2008	Panathinaikos	2–1	Górnik Zabrze	Irdning, Styria, Austria
19:00	Mantzios 53', 73'	(Report)	Pitry 33'	Attendance: 200

13 July 2008	Panathinaikos	0–0	CFR Cluj	Irdning, Styria, Austria
19:00		(Report)		Attendance: 500

17 July 2008	Panathinaikos	2–0	Baník Ostrava	Irdning, Styria, Austria
19:00	Mantzios 30'; Salpingidis 62'	(Report)		Attendance: 50

24 July 2008	Panathinaikos	5–1	Charleroi	Athens, Greece
21:45	Karagounis 30'; Sarriegi 61'; Salpingidis 70'; Vyntra 74'; Ninis 80'	{Report}	Bia 14'	Stadium: Athens Olympic Stadium; Attendance: 18,000; Referee: Christoforos Zografos

8 August 2008	Atromitos	1–2	Panathinaikos	Peristeri, Greece
19:30	Trejo 77'	{Report}	Tziolis 13'; Mantzios 76'	Stadium: Peristeri Stadium; Attendance: 3,000

23 September 2008	Athinaikos	0–6	Panathinaikos	Athens, Greece
19:30		{Report}	Petropoulos 19', 26', 63'; Christodoulopoulos 75' (pen.), 80', 85'	Stadium: Vyronas National Stadium; Attendance: 2,000

== Competitions ==
=== Super League Greece ===
==== Regular season ====
===== League table =====
Pos	Team	Pld	W	D	L	GF	GA	GD	Pts	Qualification or relegation
1	Olympiacos (C)	30	22	5	3	50	14	+36	71	Qualification for the Champions League third qualifying round
2	PAOK	30	18	9	3	39	16	+23	63	Qualification for the Play-offs
3	Panathinaikos	30	17	10	3	51	18	+33	61	Qualification for the Play-offs
4	AEK Athens	30	14	13	3	40	24	+16	55	Qualification for the Play-offs
5	AEL	30	12	13	5	36	26	+10	49	Qualification for the Play-offs

Source: Super League Greece
Rules for classification: 1) Points; 2) Head-to-head points; 3) Head-to-head goal difference; 4) Play-offs (neutral ground).
(Note: Criterion 4 is only used if needed to decide champion, teams for relegation or teams for UEFA competitions).
(C) Champions

===== Matches =====
31 August 2008 1	AEK Athens	2–1	Panathinaikos	Marousi
21:15	Edinho 20'; Blanco 45' (pen.)	(Report)	Karagounis 90+4'	Stadium: Olympic Stadium; Attendance: 30,140; Referee: Kyros Vassaras

13 September 2008 2	Panathinaikos	3–0	Panthrakikos	Marousi
19:00	Rodrigo Souza 14'; Goumas 35'; Ivanschitz 77'	(Report)		Stadium: Olympic Stadium; Attendance: 25,218; Referee: Marios Lampropoulos

20 September 2008 3	Aris	1–2	Panathinaikos	Thessaloniki
19:00	Javito 10'	Report	Cleyton 19'; Ivanschitz 26'	Stadium: Kleanthis Vikelidis Stadium; Attendance: 12,943; Referee: Giorgos Daloukas

29 October 2008 4	Panathinaikos	2–3	Ergotelis	Marousi
19:00	Gabriel 7'; Christodoulopoulos 53'	Report	Koutsianikoulis 47', 51'; Budmir 62'	Stadium: Olympic Stadium; Attendance: 13,017; Referee: Dimitris Kalopoulos

5 October 2008 5	Panathinaikos	2–0	Levadiakos	Marousi
18:30	Rukavina 25'; Salpingidis 45'	Report		Stadium: Olympic Stadium; Attendance: 19,925; Referee: Giorgos Stathopoulos

19 October 2008 6	PAOK	0–0	Panathinaikos	Thessaloniki
19:00		Report		Stadium: Toumba Stadium; Attendance: 25,795; Referee: Dimitris Kirkos

26 October 2008 7	Panathinaikos	2–2	Iraklis	Marousi
16:45	Mantzios 32'; Salpingidis 90+3'	Report	Papasterianos 62'; Ratón 64'	Stadium: Olympic Stadium; Attendance: 19,857; Referee: Petros Konstantineas

1 November 2008 8	Panionios	1–2	Panathinaikos	Nea Smyrni
19:00	Kumordzi 67'	Report	Gabriel 22'; Goumas 84'	Stadium: Nea Smyrni Stadium; Attendance: 10,060; Referee: Christoforos Zografos

9 November 2008 9	Panathinaikos	0–0	Olympiacos	Marousi
19:00		Report		Stadium: Olympic Stadium; Attendance: 60,401; Referee: Giorgos Daloukas

15 November 2008 10	AEL	1–1	Panathinaikos	Larissa
16:45	Żurawski 51'	Report	Cleyton 67'	Stadium: Alcazar Stadium; Attendance: 5,789; Referee: Dimitris Kalopoulos

22 November 2008 11	Panathinaikos	3–0	Thrasyvoulos	Marousi
19:00	Ivanschitz 7'; Petropoulos 54', 57'	Report		Stadium: Olympic Stadium; Attendance: 9,905; Referee: Kostas Papastamatis

29 November 2008 12	Panathinaikos	1–1	Asteras Tripolis	Marousi
19:00	Petropoulos 44'	Report	Bastía 71'	Stadium: Olympic Stadium; Attendance: 9,824; Referee: Evangelos Katsidonis

6 December 2008 13	Skoda Xanthi	1–2	Panathinaikos	Xanthi
19:00	Souanis 57'	Report	Gilberto Silva 22'; Rukavina 83'	Stadium: Skoda Xanthi Arena; Attendance: 3,824; Referee: Michael Koukoulakis

13 December 2008 14	Panathinaikos	3–0	Panserraikos	Marousi
16:45	Salpingidis 45+2' (pen.); Cleyton 53'; Rukavina 84'	Report		Stadium: Olympic Stadium; Attendance: 9,348; Referee: Petros Konstantineas

21 December 2008 15	OFI	0–3	Panathinaikos	Heraklion
19:00		Report	Petropoulos 52'; Salpingidis 56'; Rukavina 90+1'	Stadium: Pankritio Stadium; Attendance: 7,130; Referee: Dimitris Kalopoulos

4 January 2009 16	Panathinaikos	0–0	AEK Athens	Marousi
19:00		Report		Stadium: Olympic Stadium; Attendance: 42,018; Referee: Kyros Vassaras

10 January 2009 17	Panthrakikos	1–3	Panathinaikos	Komotini
16:45	Ponce 5'	Report	Salpingidis 24'; Mantzios 63'; Gilberto Silva 90+4'	Stadium: Komotini Stadium; Attendance: 4,200; Referee: Anastasios Kakos

18 January 2009 18	Panathinaikos	4–0	Aris	Marousi
19:00	Karagounis 46' (pen.), 56'; Rukavina 59'; Cleyton 71'	Report		Stadium: Olympic Stadium; Attendance: 23,150; Referee: Michalis Dakos

24 January 2009 19	Ergotelis	1–0	Panathinaikos	Heraklion
19:00	Romano 54'	Report		Stadium: Pankritio Stadium; Attendance: 4,850; Referee: Nathanail Charalampidis

1 February 2009 20	Levadiakos	1–2	Panathinaikos	Livadeia
16:45	Dimbala 50'	Report	Cleyton 41'; Petropoulos 63'	Stadium: Levadia Municipal Stadium; Attendance: 2,844; Referee: Giorgos Stathopoulos

8 February 2009 21	Panathinaikos	3–0	PAOK	Marousi
19:00	Vyntra 49', 55'; Mantzios 58'	Report		Stadium: Olympic Stadium; Attendance: 26,430; Referee: Michael Koukoulakis

15 February 2009 22	Iraklis	0–0	Panathinaikos	Thessaloniki
19:00		Report		Stadium: Kaftanzoglio Stadium; Attendance: 6,849; Referee: Anastasios Kakos

21 February 2009 23	Panathinaikos	2–1	Panionios	Marousi
19:00	Salpingidis 66'; Petropoulos 72'	Report	Estoyanoff 90+2'	Stadium: Olympic Stadium; Attendance: 8,009; Referee: Christoforos Zografos

1 March 2009 24	Olympiacos	0–0	Panathinaikos	Piraeus
18:30		Report		Stadium: Karaiskakis Stadium; Attendance: 28,775; Referee: Dimitris Spathas

7 March 2009 25	Panathinaikos	3–0	AEL	Marousi
19:00	Salpingidis 48'; Gilberto Silva 53'; Christodoulopoulos 56'	Report		Stadium: Olympic Stadium; Attendance: 8,194; Referee: Nathanail Charalampidis

15 March 2009 26	Thrasyvoulos	0–1	Panathinaikos	Fyli
19:00		Report	Salpingidis 12' (pen.)	Stadium: Fyli Stadium; Attendance: 846; Referee: Dimitris Kirkos

22 March 2009 27	Asteras Tripolis	1–1	Panathinaikos	Tripoli
19:00	Kaounos 65'	Report	Salpingidis 24'	Stadium: Asteras Tripolis Stadium; Attendance: 3,537; Referee: Ilias Spathas

5 April 2009 28	Panathinaikos	2–0	Skoda Xanthi	Marousi
19:00	Salpingidis 42'; Gabriel 66'	Report		Stadium: Olympic Stadium; Attendance: 6,190; Referee: Giorgos Stathopoulos

12 April 2009 29	Panserraikos	0–0	Panathinaikos	Serres
19:00		Report		Stadium: Serres Municipal Stadium; Attendance: 3,958; Referee: Kostas Papastamatis

26 April 2009 30	Panathinaikos	3–1	OFI	Marousi
19:00	Mantzios 52'; Christodoulopoulos 61'; Cleyton 76'	Report	Kostovski 72'	Stadium: Olympic Stadium; Attendance: 7,145; Referee: Stavros Tritsonis

==== Play-offs ====
===== League table =====
Pos	Team	Pld	W	D	L	GF	GA	GD	Pts	Qualification
2	Panathinaikos	6	5	1	0	12	3	+9	18	Qualification for the Champions League third qualifying round
3	AEK Athens	6	3	2	1	8	6	+2	12	Qualification for the Europa League play-off round
4	PAOK	6	2	0	4	5	9	−4	9	Qualification for the Europa League third qualifying round
5	AEL	6	0	1	5	3	10	−7	1	Qualification for the Europa League second qualifying round

Source: Super League Greece and Worldfootball.net
Rules for classification: 1) points; 2) head-to-head points; 3) head-to-head goal difference; 4) head-to-head goals scored; 5) goal difference; 6) number of goals scored.

===== Matches =====
10 May 2009 1	PAOK	0–1	Panathinaikos	Thessaloniki
			Karagounis 87'	Stadium: Toumba Stadium; Attendance: 27,703; Referee: Anastasios Kakos

13 May 2009 2	Panathinaikos	1–1	AEK Athens	Marousi
	Gabriel 43' (pen.)		Scocco 12'	Stadium: Olympic Stadium; Attendance: 22,980; Referee: Ilias Spathas

17 May 2009 3	Panathinaikos	3–1	AEL	Marousi
	Salpingidis 10'; Karagounis 25'; Rukavina 73'		Metin 54'	Stadium: Olympic Stadium; Attendance: 9,727; Referee: Giorgos Stathopoulos

20 May 2009 4	AEL	0–1	Panathinaikos	Larissa
			Moon 67'	Stadium: Alcazar Stadium; Attendance: 3,286; Referee: Dimitris Kirkos

24 May 2009 5	Panathinaikos	4–1	PAOK	Marousi
	Karagounis 36' (pen.); Gabriel 40'; Salpingidis 59'; Petropoulos 90'		Anastasakos 63'	Stadium: Olympic Stadium; Attendance: 14,673; Referee: Ilias Spathas

31 May 2009 6	AEK	0–2	Panathinaikos	Marousi
			Karagounis 30' (pen.); Rukavina 36'	Stadium: Olympic Stadium; Attendance: 30,435; Referee: Anastasios Kakos

=== Greek Cup ===
==== Fourth round ====
12 November 2008	Kavala	0–3	Panathinaikos	Kavala
		Report	Rukavina 9', 70'; Christodoulopoulos 89'	Stadium: Anthi Karagianni Stadium; Attendance: 7,000; Referee: Giannis Stavridis

==== Fifth round ====
14 January 2009	Panthrakikos	0–4	Panathinaikos	Komotini
18:45		Report	Rukavina 18'; Gabriel 57'; Cleyton 74'; Christodoulopoulos 77'	Stadium: Komotini Municipal Stadium; Attendance: 3,500; Referee: Giorgos Daloukas

==== Quarter-finals ====
4 February 2009 First leg	Panserraikos	0–0	Panathinaikos	Serres
19:00		Report		Stadium: Serres Municipal Stadium; Attendance: 2,319; Referee: Christoforos Zografos

4 March 2009 Second leg	Panathinaikos	2–3 (2–3 agg.)	Panserraikos	Marousi
18:45	Christodoulopoulos 77'; Papazoglou 90+3' (o.g.)	Report	Baykara 23'; Čeh 56' (pen.), 71'	Stadium: Olympic Stadium; Attendance: 6,354; Referee: Giorgos Giannopoulos

=== UEFA Champions League ===
==== Qualifying phase ====
===== Second qualifying round =====
30 July 2008 First leg	Panathinaikos (Greece)	3–0	(Georgia (country)) Dinamo Tbilisi	Athens, Greece
21:45	Ivanschitz 23'; Salpingidis 45', 74'	Report		Stadium: Olympic Stadium; Attendance: 50,864; Referee: Bruno Paixão (Portugal)

6 August 2008 Second leg	Dinamo Tbilisi (Georgia (country))	0–0 (0–3 agg.)	(Greece) Panathinaikos	Tbilisi, Georgia
21:45		Report		Stadium: Boris Paichadze Stadium; Attendance: 7,000; Referee: Cristian Balaj (Romania)

===== Third qualifying round =====
13 August 2008 First leg	Sparta Prague (Czech Republic)	1–2	(Greece) Panathinaikos	Prague, Czech Republic
21:45	Kulič 30'	Report	Kučera 24' (o.g.); Simão 60'	Stadium: AXA Arena; Attendance: 14,478; Referee: Yuri Baskakov (Russia)

26 August 2008 Second leg	Panathinaikos (Greece)	1–0 (3–1 agg.)	(Czech Republic) Sparta Prague	Athens, Greece
21:45	Souza 89'	Report		Stadium: Olympic Stadium; Attendance: 59,659; Referee: Alain Hamer (Luxembourg)

==== Group B ====
Pos	Team	Pld	W	D	L	GF	GA	GD	Pts	Qualification
1	(Greece) Panathinaikos	6	3	1	2	8	7	+1	10	Advance to knockout phase
2	(Italy) Internazionale	6	2	2	2	8	7	+1	8	Advance to knockout phase
3	(Germany) Werder Bremen	6	1	4	1	7	9	−2	7	Transfer to UEFA Cup
4	(Cyprus) Anorthosis Famagusta	6	1	3	2	8	8	0	6	

Source: RSSSF

16 September 2008 1	Panathinaikos (Greece)	0–2	(Italy) Internazionale	Athens, Greece
20:45		Report	Mancini 27'; Adriano 85'	Stadium: Olympic Stadium; Attendance: 58,378; Referee: Manuel Mejuto González (Spain)

1 October 2008 2	Anorthosis (Cyprus)	3–1	(Greece) Panathinaikos	Nicosia, Cyprus
20:45	Sarriegi 11' (o.g.); Dobrasinović 15'; Hawar M. 78'	Report	Salpingidis 28' (pen.)	Stadium: GSP Stadium; Attendance: 19,259; Referee: Eric Braamhaar (Netherlands)

22 October 2008 3	Panathinaikos (Greece)	2–2	(Germany) Werder Bremen	Athens, Greece
20:45	Mantzios 36' 68'	Report	Mertesacker 29'; Almeida 82'	Stadium: Olympic Stadium; Attendance: 54,089; Referee: Mike Riley (England)

4 November 2008 4	Werder Bremen (Germany)	0–3	(Greece) Panathinaikos	Bremen, Germany
20:45		Report	Mantzios 58'; Karagounis 70'; Tziolis 83'	Stadium: Weserstadion; Attendance: 35,968; Referee: Viktor Kassai (Hungary)

26 November 2008 5	Internazionale (Italy)	0–1	(Greece) Panathinaikos	Milan, Italy
20:45		Report	Sarriegi 69'	Stadium: Stadio Giuseppe Meazza; Attendance: 34,955; Referee: Tom Henning Øvrebø (Norway)

9 December 2008 6	Panathinaikos (Greece)	1–0	(Cyprus) Anorthosis	Athens, Greece
20:45	Karagounis 69'	Report		Stadium: Olympic Stadium; Attendance: 59,872; Referee: Bertrand Layec (France)

==== Knockout stage ====
===== Round of 16 =====
25 February 2009 First leg	Villarreal (Spain)	1–1	(Greece) Panathinaikos	Villarreal, Spain
20:45	Rossi 67' (pen.)	Report	Karagounis 59'	Stadium: Estadio El Madrigal; Attendance: 21,810; Referee: Konrad Plautz (Austria)

10 March 2009 Second leg	Panathinaikos (Greece)	1–2 (2–3 agg.)	(Spain) Villarreal	Athens, Greece
20:45	Mantzios 55'	Report	Ibagaza 49'; Llorente 70'	Stadium: Olympic Stadium; Attendance: 60,616; Referee: Massimo Busacca (Switzerland)

== Statistics ==
No.	Pos.	Name	Super League		Greek Cup		Champions League		Total		Discipline	
No.	Pos.	Name	Apps	Goals	Apps	Goals	Apps	Goals	Apps	Goals	Yellow card	Red card
1	GK	(Croatia) Mario Galinović	32	0	1	0	11	0	44	0	2	0
2	DF	(South Africa) Bryce Moon	12	1	3	0	3	0	18	1	2	1
3	DF	(Spain) Josu Sarriegi	28	0	2	0	10	1	40	1	16	2
4	MF	(Brazil) Marcelo Mattos	18	0	1	0	5	0	24	0	3	0
5	MF	(Croatia) Ante Rukavina	25	7	4	3	7	0	36	10	1	1
6	DF	(Greece) Christos Melissis	9	0	2	0	0	0	11	0	1	0
7	MF	(Greece) Sotiris Ninis	22	0	1	0	4	0	27	0	2	0
8	DF	(Greece) Yannis Goumas	10	2	2	0	7	0	19	2	6	0
9	FW	(Brazil) Rodrigo de Souza Cardoso	4	1	0	0	4	1	8	2	1	0
10	MF	(Brazil) Silva Cleyton	22	6	4	1	5	0	31	7	3	0
14	FW	(Greece) Dimitris Salpingidis	34	12	4	0	12	3	50	15	3	0
15	MF	(Brazil) Gilberto Silva	29	3	2	0	11	0	42	3	5	0
16	DF	(Greece) Stefanos Siontis	2	0	1	0	0	0	3	0	0	0
17	FW	(Greece) Lazaros Christodoulopoulos	19	3	4	4	5	0	28	7	2	0
19	DF	(Brazil) Gabriel	22	5	3	1	8	0	33	6	1	0
20	MF	(Greece) Sotiris Leontiou	0	0	0	0	0	0	0	0	0	0
21	MF	(Greece) Giorgos Karagounis(c)	24	7	1	0	10	3	35	10	6	0
22	MF	(Greece) Alexandros Tziolis	10	0	1	0	5	1	16	1	0	0
23	MF	(Mozambique) Mate Junior Simao	29	0	3	0	11	1	43	1	7	0
24	DF	(Greece) Loukas Vyntra	30	2	3	0	12	0	45	2	7	0
25	DF	(Poland) Jakub Wawrzyniak	9	0	2	0	2	0	13	0	2	0
26	FW	(Greece) Evangelos Mantzios	16	4	0	0	8	4	24	8	0	0
27	MF	(Austria) Andreas Ivanschitz	18	3	2	0	6	1	26	4	5	0
28	FW	(Greece) Antonis Petropoulos	15	7	2	0	0	0	17	7	2	0
29	DF	(Sweden) Mikael Nilsson	24	0	1	0	10	0	35	0	3	0
30	GK	(Greece) Alexandros Tzorvas	4	0	3	0	1	0	8	0	0	0
31	DF	(Greece) Nikos Spiropoulos	30	0	3	0	10	0	43	0	8	0
32	DF	(Greece) Nikos Pantidos	0	0	0	0	0	0	1	0	0	0
33	GK	(Greece) Orestis Karnezis	0	0	0	0	0	0	0	0	0	0
-	-	Totals	36	63	4	9	12	15	40	67	85	4

=== Top scorers ===
As of 7 March 2009

P.	Player	Position	Super League	Greek Cup	Champions League	Total
1	(Greece) Dimitris Salpingidis	Forward	7	-	3	10
2	(Croatia) Ante Rukavina	Forward	5	3	-	8
3	(Brazil) Silva Cleyton	Midfielder	5	1	-	6
4	(Greece) Evangelos Mantzios	Forward	3	-	3	6
5	(Greece) Giorgos Karagounis	Midfielder	3	-	3	6

Source: pao.com Statistics

=== Most appearances ===
As of 7 March 2009

P.	Player	Position	Super League	Greek Cup	Champions League	Total
1	(Greece) Dimitris Salpingidis	Forward	23	4	11	38
2	(Greece) Loukas Vyntra	Defender	22	3	11	36
3	(Greece) Nikos Spiropoulos	Defender	21	3	10	34
4	(Mozambique) Mate Junior Simao	Midfielder	21	3	10	34
5	(Brazil) Gilberto Silva	Midfielder	21	2	10	33

Source: pao.com Statistics

== Team kit ==
Home	Away	Third	Home (2)	Away (2)
