= 2020–21 Super League Greece =

85th season of top-tier football league in Greece

Super League 1
- Season: 2020–21
- Dates: 11 September 2020 – 16 May 2021
- Champions: Olympiacos; 46th Greek title
- Relegated: AEL
- Champions League: Olympiacos
- Europa Conference League: PAOK; Aris; AEK Athens
- Matches: 240
- Goals: 529 (2.2 per match)
- Best player: Youssef El-Arabi
- Top goalscorer: Youssef El-Arabi (22 goals)
- Biggest home win: PAOK 5–0 Panetolikos (31 January 2021)
- Biggest away win: Lamia 0–6 Olympiacos (13 December 2020)
- Highest scoring: Apollon Smyrnis 3–4 AEK Athens (13 December 2020)
- Longest winning run: Olympiacos (7 matches)
- Longest unbeaten run: Olympiacos (21 matches)
- Longest winless run: OFI (12 matches)
- Longest losing run: OFI (10 matches)
- All statistics correct as of 19 May 2021.

The 2020–21 Super League Greece was the 85th season of the Super League Greece, the top Greek professional league for association football clubs, since its establishment in 1959. Olympiacos were the defending champions.

== Teams ==
Fourteen teams competed in the league – the top twelve teams from the previous season, the play-off winner and one team promoted from the Super League 2. The promoted team was PAS Giannina, who returned to the first tier after a one-season absence. They replaced Panionios who were relegated after 23 seasons in the top flight.

Apollon Smyrnis were also promoted by virtue of winning the play-off round, which relegated Xanthi after 31 years.

Promoted from 2019–20 Super League Greece 2	Relegated from 2019–20 Super League Greece
PAS Giannina; Apollon Smyrnis	Xanthi; Panionios

=== Stadiums and locations ===
Locations of the 2020–21 Super League Greece teams

Note: Table lists in alphabetical order.

Team	Location	Stadium	Capacity	2019–20
AEK Athens	Athens (Marousi)	Athens Olympic Stadium	69,618	3rd
AEL	Larissa	Alcazar Stadium	13,108	9th
Apollon Smyrnis	Athens (Rizoupoli)	Georgios Kamaras Stadium	14,200	2nd (SL2)
Aris	Thessaloniki (Charilaou)	Kleanthis Vikelidis Stadium	22,800	5th
Asteras Tripolis	Tripoli	Theodoros Kolokotronis Stadium	7,442	7th
Atromitos	Athens (Peristeri)	Peristeri Stadium	10,050	8th
Lamia	Lamia	Lamia Municipal Stadium	5,500	10th
OFI	Heraklion	Theodoros Vardinogiannis Stadium	9,088	6th
Olympiacos	Piraeus	Karaiskakis Stadium	32,115	1st
Panathinaikos	Athens (Ampelokipoi)	Leoforos Alexandras Stadium	16,003	4th
Panetolikos	Agrinio	Panetolikos Stadium	7,321	12th
PAOK	Thessaloniki (Toumba)	Toumba Stadium	28,703	2nd
PAS Giannina	Ioannina	Zosimades Stadium	7,652	1st (SL2)
Volos	Volos	Panthessaliko Stadium	22,700	11th

=== Personnel and kits ===
Team	Manager	Captain	Kit manufacturer	Shirt sponsor
AEK Athens	(Spain) Manolo Jiménez	(Greece) Petros Mantalos	Capelli	Pame Stoixima
AEL	(Greece) Michalis Ziogas	(Serbia) Radomir Milosavljević	Legea	Thrakis Gefseis
Apollon Smyrnis	(Greece) Makis Chavos	(Brazil) Thomás Bedinelli	Hummel	Venetis Bakery
Aris	(Greece) Akis Mantzios	(Greece) Georgios Delizisis	Nike	betshop.gr
Asteras Tripolis	(Serbia) Milan Rastavac	(Argentina) Matías Iglesias	Macron	Volton
Atromitos	(Greece) Savvas Pantelidis	(Argentina) Javier Umbides	Nike	NetBet
Lamia	(Greece) Michalis Grigoriou	(Greece) Loukas Vyntra	Macron	N/A
OFI	(Greece) Nikos Nioplias	(Greece) Nikos Korovesis	Puma	betshop.gr
Olympiacos	(Portugal) Pedro Martins	(Greece) Andreas Bouchalakis	Adidas	Stoiximan
Panathinaikos	(Greece) Sotiris Sylaidopoulos	(Greece) Dimitrios Kourbelis	Kappa	Pame Stoixima
Panetolikos	(Greece) Traianos Dellas	(Uruguay) Jorge Díaz	Givova	Car.gr
PAOK	(Uruguay) Pablo García	(Portugal) Vieirinha	Macron	Stoiximan
PAS Giannina	(Greece) Argiris Giannikis	(Greece) Stefanos Siontis	Kappa	NetBet
Volos	(Greece) Kostas Bratsos	(Greece) Thanasis Garavelis	Luanvi	EBOL

=== Managerial changes ===
Team	Outgoing manager	Manner of departure	Date of vacancy	Position in table	Incoming manager	Date of appointment
Panathinaikos	(Greece) Georgios Donis	End of contract	19 July 2020	Pre-season	(Spain) Dani Poyatos	22 July 2020
Atromitos	(Greece) Savvas Pantelidis	Mutual consent	20 July 2020	Pre-season	(Austria) Damir Canadi	29 July 2020
Volos	(Greece) Stefanos Xirofotos	Mutual consent	23 July 2020	Pre-season	(Greece) Sakis Tsiolis	24 July 2020
Volos	(Greece) Sakis Tsiolis	Sacked	30 August 2020	Pre-season	(Spain) Ángel López	1 September 2020
Apollon Smyrnis	(Greece) Babis Tennes	Mutual consent	1 September 2020	Pre-season	(Greece) Georgios Paraschos	2 September 2020
Aris	(Germany) Michael Oenning	Sacked	17 September 2020	1st	(Greece) Apostolos Terzis (caretaker)	18 September 2020
Aris	(Greece) Apostolos Terzis (caretaker)	End of tenure as caretaker	20 September 2020	1st	(Greece) Akis Mantzios	21 September 2020
Lamia	(Greece) Giorgos Petrakis	Sacked	6 October 2020	14th	(Greece) Babis Tennes	8 October 2020
Panathinaikos	(Spain) Dani Poyatos	Sacked	11 October 2020	13th	(Greece) Sotiris Sylaidopoulos (caretaker)	12 October 2020
Panathinaikos	(Greece) Sotiris Sylaidopoulos (caretaker)	End of tenure as caretaker	18 October 2020	11th	(Romania) László Bölöni	19 October 2020
Panetolikos	(Greece) Makis Chavos	Sacked	28 October 2020	12th	(Brazil) Luciano (caretaker)	29 October 2020
PAOK	(Portugal) Abel Ferreira	Resigned	29 October 2020	6th	(Uruguay) Pablo García	30 October 2020
Panetolikos	(Brazil) Luciano (caretaker)	End of tenure as caretaker	10 November 2020	12th	(Greece) Traianos Dellas	11 November 2020
AEL	(Greece) Michalis Grigoriou	Resigned	22 November 2020	11th	(Greece) Giannis Tatsis	23 November 2020
Lamia	(Greece) Babis Tennes	Sacked	16 December 2020	14th	(Greece) Michalis Grigoriou	17 December 2020
AEK Athens	(Italy) Massimo Carrera	Sacked	21 December 2020	4th	(Spain) Manolo Jiménez	22 December 2020
AEL	(Greece) Giannis Tatsis	Sacked	20 January 2021	13th	(Italy) Gianluca Festa	22 January 2021
Atromitos	(Austria) Damir Canadi	Sacked	4 February 2021	7th	(Greece) Savvas Pantelidis	5 February 2021
OFI	(Greece) Georgios Simos	Sacked	6 March 2021	12th	(Greece) Nikos Nioplias	8 March 2021
Apollon Smyrnis	(Greece) Georgios Paraschos	Resigned	14 March 2021	9th	(Greece) Makis Chavos	17 March 2021
Volos	(Spain) Ángel López	Sacked	19 April 2021	7th	(Greece) Kostas Bratsos (caretaker)	21 April 2021
AEL	(Italy) Gianluca Festa	Sacked	8 May 2021	14th	(Greece) Michalis Ziogas (caretaker)	9 May 2021
Panathinaikos	(Romania) László Bölöni	Sacked	10 May 2021	5th	(Greece) Sotiris Sylaidopoulos (caretaker)	11 May 2021

== Regular season ==
=== League table ===
Pos	Team	Pld	W	D	L	GF	GA	GD	Pts	Qualification
1	Olympiacos	26	21	4	1	64	13	+51	67	Qualification for the Play-off round
2	Aris	26	15	6	5	34	16	+18	51	Qualification for the Play-off round
3	AEK Athens	26	14	6	6	41	29	+12	48	Qualification for the Play-off round
4	PAOK	26	13	8	5	49	26	+23	47	Qualification for the Play-off round
5	Panathinaikos	26	13	6	7	30	19	+11	45	Qualification for the Play-off round
6	Asteras Tripolis	26	11	9	6	27	25	+2	42	Qualification for the Play-off round
7	Volos	26	8	9	9	26	32	−6	33	Qualification for the Play-out round
8	PAS Giannina	26	8	7	11	23	26	−3	31	Qualification for the Play-out round
9	Apollon Smyrnis	26	8	4	14	26	35	−9	28 (Note: Head to head points: Apollon 4, Atromitos 1.)	Qualification for the Play-out round
10	Atromitos	26	6	10	10	24	35	−11	28	Qualification for the Play-out round
11	Lamia	26	5	8	13	14	38	−24	23	Qualification for the Play-out round
12	Panetolikos	26	4	8	14	13	32	−19	20	Qualification for the Play-out round
13	OFI	26	5	4	17	22	43	−21	19	Qualification for the Play-out round
14	AEL	26	3	7	16	18	42	−24	16	Qualification for the Play-out round

Source: Super League Greece
Rules for classification: 1) Points; 2) Head-to-head points; 3) Head-to-head goal difference; 4) Goals scored; 5) Goals against.

=== Results ===
Home \ Away	AEK	AEL	APS	ARIS	AST	ATR	LAM	OFI	OLY	PAO	PNE	PAOK	PAS	VOL
AEK Athens	—	4–1	2–0	0–2	2–2	2–1	3–0	2–1	1–1	1–2	1–0	1–1	0–2	2–2
AEL	2–4	—	0–1	0–3	1–3	0–0	0–1	0–1	1–3	1–1	1–0	1–1	0–0	0–0
Apollon Smyrnis	3–4	1–0	—	0–1	0–1	2–1	0–1	2–1	1–3	0–1	1–0	1–3	1–2	3–3
Aris	0–1	1–0	1–0	—	1–0	3–0	3–1	1–0	1–2	0–1	0–0	1–0	2–2	2–0
Asteras Tripolis	1–2	1–0	0–0	2–1	—	2–0	0–0	1–0	0–4	1–0	2–0	2–1	0–1	1–1
Atromitos	1–0	1–1	2–2	2–2	1–1	—	2–1	0–0	0–1	2–3	2–0	3–2	0–2	0–2
Lamia	0–1	2–1	1–0	2–0	2–2	0–0	—	1–2	0–6	0–2	0–0	0–2	0–0	1–2
OFI	0–2	2–3	0–2	0–3	0–1	2–2	2–0	—	0–2	2–2	1–1	0–3	2–1	1–2
Olympiacos	3–0	5–1	2–0	1–1	3–0	4–0	3–0	3–0	—	1–0	2–0	3–0	1–0	4–1
Panathinaikos	1–1	2–0	1–0	0–1	0–0	0–1	0–0	2–0	2–1	—	2–1	2–1	2–0	1–1
Panetolikos	0–2	2–1	0–1	0–1	1–1	1–1	0–0	2–1	1–2	1–0	—	1–3	1–2	1–0
PAOK	2–2	1–0	2–2	2–2	2–0	1–1	4–0	3–0	1–1	2–1	5–0	—	2–1	3–1
PAS Giannina	0–1	1–2	1–3	0–0	2–2	0–1	2–0	1–0	1–1	1–0	0–0	0–2	—	0–1
Volos	1–0	1–1	2–0	0–1	0–1	1–0	1–1	1–4	1–2	0–2	0–0	0–0	2–1	—

Source: Super League Greece
Legend: Blue = home team win; Yellow = draw; Red = away team win.
For upcoming matches, an "a" indicates there is an article about the rivalry between the two participants.

=== Positions by round ===
The table lists the positions of teams after each week of matches. To preserve chronological evolvements, any postponed matches are not included in the round at which they were originally scheduled, but added to the full round they were played immediately afterwards. For example, if a match is scheduled for round 13, but then postponed and played between rounds 16 and 17, it will be added to the standings for round 16.

Team ╲ Round	1	2	3	4	5	6	7	8	9	10	11	12	13	14	15	16	17	18	19	20	21	22	23	24	25	26
Olympiacos	9	4	3	3	2	3	2	1	1	1	1	1	1	1	1	1	1	1	1	1	1	1	1	1	1	1
Aris	1	1	1	1	1	1	1	2	2	2	3	2	2	2	2	3	4	3	2	3	2	2	3	2	2	2
AEK Athens	5	2	4	5	5	4	3	4	4	4	4	4	4	4	4	2	2	2	3	2	4	3	4	4	3	3
PAOK	3	3	5	2	4	6	4	3	3	3	2	3	3	3	3	4	3	4	4	4	3	4	2	3	4	4
Panathinaikos	11	12	10	13	12	11	9	9	8	8	5	5	5	6	5	5	5	5	5	5	5	5	5	5	6	5
Asteras Tripolis	8	8	8	8	6	5	6	6	6	7	8	6	6	7	7	6	6	6	6	6	6	6	6	6	5	6
Volos	4	7	7	4	3	2	5	5	5	5	6	8	7	5	6	9	8	7	7	8	8	7	7	7	7	7
PAS Giannina	10	11	9	9	8	9	7	7	10	10	10	10	10	11	11	11	11	11	11	11	9	10	9	10	8	8
Apollon Smyrnis	13	10	8	9	10	10	11	13	11	11	11	11	11	8	10	10	10	10	10	10	10	9	10	9	10	9
Atromitos	7	5	2	6	9	7	8	8	7	6	7	9	9	10	9	7	7	8	8	7	7	8	8	8	9	10
Lamia	14	14	14	14	14	14	14	14	14	14	14	14	14	14	14	14	14	14	13	13	13	12	12	12	11	11
Panetolikos	6	9	12	11	11	12	12	12	13	13	12	12	12	12	12	12	12	12	12	12	12	13	13	13	12	12
OFI	2	6	6	7	7	8	10	10	9	9	9	7	8	9	8	8	9	9	9	9	11	11	11	11	13	13
AEL	12	13	11	12	13	13	13	11	12	12	13	13	13	13	13	13	13	13	14	14	14	14	14	14	14	14

Leader and Qualification for the Play-off round
Qualification for the Play-off round
Qualification for the Play-out round

Source: Super League Greece

== Play-off round ==
The top six teams from Regular season will meet twice (10 matches per team) for places in 2021–22 UEFA Champions League and 2021–22 UEFA Europa Conference League as well as deciding the league champion.

Pos	Team	Pld	W	D	L	GF	GA	GD	Pts	Qualification	OLY	PAOK	ARIS	AEK	PAO	AST
1	Olympiacos (C)	36	28	6	2	82	19	+63	90	Qualification for the Champions League second qualifying round	—	1–0	1–0	2–0	3–1	1–0
2	PAOK	36	18	10	8	60	34	+26	64	Qualification for the Europa Conference League third qualifying round (Note: PAOK qualified for the Europa Conference League third qualifying round by winning the Greek Cup.)	2–0	—	2–0	3–1	0–0	0–1
3	Aris	36	17	10	9	41	26	+15	61	Qualification for the Europa Conference League second qualifying round	1–1	0–1	—	1–3	0–0	2–0
4	AEK Athens	36	17	9	10	53	45	+8	60	Qualification for the Europa Conference League second qualifying round	1–5	1–2	0–0	—	1–1	3–1
5	Panathinaikos	36	14	11	11	41	34	+7	53		1–4	3–0	1–2	0–1	—	2–2
6	Asteras Tripolis	36	12	15	9	36	38	−2	51		0–0	1–1	1–1	1–1	2–2	—

Source: Super League Greece
Legend: Blue = home team win; Yellow = draw; Red = away team win.
Rules for classification: 1) Points; 2) Head-to-head points (Regular season and play-off); 3) Head-to-head goal difference (Regular season and play-off); 4) Regular season position.
(C) Champions

=== Play-off round positions by round ===
Team ╲ Round	26	27	28	29	30	31	32	33	34	35	36
Olympiacos	1	1	1	1	1	1	1	1	1	1	1
PAOK	4	3	3	3	3	3	3	2	2	2	2
Aris	2	2	2	2	2	2	2	3	3	3	3
AEK Athens	3	4	5	4	4	4	4	4	4	4	4
Panathinaikos	5	5	4	5	5	5	5	5	5	5	5
Asteras Tripolis	6	6	6	6	6	6	6	6	6	6	6

Champion and Champions League second qualifying round
Europa Conference League third qualifying round
Europa Conference League second qualifying round

Source: Super League Greece

== Play-out round ==
Pos	Team	Pld	W	D	L	GF	GA	GD	Pts	Qualification or relegation	VOL	ATR	PAS	LAM	APS	OFI	PNE	AEL
7	Volos	33	10	13	10	34	37	−3	43		—	—	1–1	—	—	0–0	3–1	3–1
8	Atromitos	33	8	13	12	30	40	−10	37		1–0	—	—	0–0	1–1	—	—	0–1
9	PAS Giannina	33	9	8	16	27	36	−9	35		—	1–0	—	1–2	0–2	—	0–1	—
10	Lamia	33	8	11	14	21	42	−21	35		1–1	—	—	—	—	0–2	—	0–0
11	Apollon Smyrnis	33	9	7	17	29	40	−11	34		0–0	—	—	0–1	—	0–0	—	0–2
12	OFI	33	8	8	17	30	47	−17	32		—	1–1	2–1	—	—	—	2–2	—
13	Panetolikos (O)	33	6	10	17	20	44	−24	28	Qualification for the relegation play-offs	—	1–3	—	0–3	1–0	—	—	—
14	AEL (R)	33	6	9	18	25	47	−22	27	Relegation to Super League 2	—	—	2–0	—	—	0–1	1–1	—

Source: Super League Greece
Legend: Blue = home team win; Yellow = draw; Red = away team win.
Rules for classification: 1) Points; 2) Head-to-head points (Regular season and play-out); 3) Head-to-head goal difference (Regular season and play-out); 4) Regular season position.
(O) Play-off winners; (R) Relegated

=== Play-out round positions by round ===
Team ╲ Round	26	27	28	29	30	31	32	33
Volos	7	7	7	7	7	7	7	7
Atromitos	10	10	10	11	11	11	9	8
PAS Giannina	8	8	8	8	8	8	8	9
Lamia	11	11	11	9	9	9	10	10
Apollon Smyrnis	9	9	9	10	10	10	11	11
OFI	13	13	12	12	12	12	12	12
Panetolikos	12	12	13	14	13	13	13	13
AEL	14	14	14	13	14	14	14	14

Qualification for the relegation play-offs
Relegation to 2021–22 Super League Greece 2

Source: slgr.gr

== Relegation play-offs ==
Summary
Team 1	Agg.	Team 2	1st leg	2nd leg
Xanthi	2–2 (a)	Panetolikos	2–1	0–1

26 May 2021
15:30 (EEST)
First leg

Xanthi	2–1	Panetolikos
Ebert 52'; Mikeltadze 71'		Vergos 6'

Xanthi FC Arena, Xanthi
Attendance: Behind closed doors
Referee: Anastasios Sidiropoulos (Dodecanese)
30 May 2021
19:30 (EEST)
Second leg

Panetolikos	1–0	Xanthi
Vergos 83'

Panetolikos Stadium, Agrinio
Attendance: Behind closed doors
Referee: Evangelos Evangelou (Athens)

Panetolikos won on away goals, therefore both teams stay in their respective leagues next season.

== Season statistics ==
=== Top scorers ===
As of 16 May 2021

Rank	Player	Club	Goals
1	(Morocco) Youssef El-Arabi	Olympiacos	22
2	(Greece) Georgios Masouras	Olympiacos	13
2	(Iran) Karim Ansarifard	AEK Athens	13
3	(Poland) Karol Świderski	PAOK	11
3	(Greece) Anastasios Douvikas	Volos	11
3	(Argentina) Jerónimo Barrales	Asteras Tripolis	11
4	(Egypt) Ahmed Hassan	Olympiacos	10
4	(Serbia) Andrija Živković	PAOK	10
5	(Italy) Federico Macheda	Panathinaikos	9
5	(Greece) Kostas Fortounis	Olympiacos	9

=== Top assists ===
As of 4 April 2021

Rank	Player	Club	Assists
1	(Greece) Kostas Fortounis	Olympiacos	11
2	(Greece) Petros Mantalos	AEK Athens	9
3	(France) Mathieu Valbuena	Olympiacos	6
3	(Trinidad and Tobago) Levi García	AEK Athens	6
4	(Argentina) Julián Bartolo	Volos	5
4	(Sweden) Muamer Tanković	AEK Athens	5
4	(Poland) Karol Świderski	PAOK	5
4	(Greece) Christos Tzolis	PAOK	5
4	(Greece) Anastasios Chatzigiovanis	Panathinaikos	5
4	(Greece) Andreas Bouchalakis	Olympiacos	5
4	(Greece) Georgios Masouras	Olympiacos	5
4	(Morocco) Youssef El-Arabi	Olympiacos	5

== Αwards ==
=== NIVEA MEN Player of the Month ===
Month	Player	Club	Ref
September	(Greece) Georgios Masouras	Olympiacos	
October	(Australia) James Jeggo	Aris	
November	(Greece) Kostas Fortounis	Olympiacos	
December	(Morocco) Youssef El-Arabi	Olympiacos	
January	(Brazil) Lucas Sasha	Aris	
February	(Poland) Damian Szymański	AEK Athens	
March	(Argentina) Facundo Bertoglio	Aris	
April	(Portugal) Bruma	Olympiacos	
May	(Greece) Petros Mantalos	AEK Athens	

=== NIVEA MEN Player of the Club ===
Club	MVP	Ref
Olympiacos	(Morocco) Youssef El-Arabi	
PAOK	(Serbia) Andrija Živković	
Aris	(Brazil) Lucas Sasha	
AEK Athens	(Trinidad and Tobago) Levi García	
Panathinaikos	(Greece) Sokratis Dioudis	
Asteras Tripolis	(Argentina) Jerónimo Barrales	
Volos	(Greece) Anastasios Douvikas	
Atromitos	(Argentina) Javier Umbides	
PAS Giannina	(Belgium) Marvin Peersman	
Lamia	(Georgia (country)) Bachana Arabuli	
Apollon Smyrnis	(Greece) Andoni Fatjon	
OFI	(Netherlands) Jonathan de Guzmán	
Panetolikos	(Austria) Christopher Knett	
AEL	(Greece) Dimitrios Pinakas	

=== NIVEA MEN Player of the Regular season ===
Player	Club	Votes	Ref
(Morocco) Youssef El-Arabi	Olympiacos	48.71%	

=== NIVEA MEN Best Goal of the season ===
Player	Club	Match	Votes	Ref
Regular Season
(Georgia (country)) Bachana Arabuli	Lamia	vs Aris 2–0 (Matchday 14)	52.87%	
Play-offs/Play-outs
(Portugal) Xande Silva	Aris	vs Asteras Tripolis 1–0 (Matchday 2)	36.21%	

=== NIVEA MEN Best Goal ===
Matchday	Player	Club	Ref
Regular Season
1st	(Greece) Christos Tzolis	PAOK	
2nd	(Serbia) Andrija Živković	PAOK	
3rd	(Serbia) Nenad Krstičić	AEK Athens	
4th	(Argentina) Daniel Mancini	Aris	
5th	(Portugal) Bruno Gama	Aris	
6th	(Portugal) Xande Silva	Aris	
7th	(Ukraine) Yevhen Shakhov	AEK Athens	
8th	(Trinidad and Tobago) Levi García	AEK Athens	
9th	(Portugal) André Simões	AEK Athens	
10th	(Iran) Karim Ansarifard	AEK Athens	
11th	(Greece) Christos Tzolis	PAOK	
12th	(Trinidad and Tobago) Levi García	AEK Athens	
13th	(Sweden) Muamer Tanković	AEK Athens	
14th	(Georgia (country)) Bachana Arabuli	Lamia	
15th	(Argentina) Facundo Bertoglio	Aris	
16th	(Greece) Dimitrios Emmanouilidis	Panathinaikos	
17th	(Egypt) Ahmed Hassan	Olympiacos	
18th	(Greece) Argyris Kampetsis	Panathinaikos	
19th	(Spain) Juan Muñiz	Atromitos	
20th	(Spain) Adrián Riera	Asteras Tripolis	
21st	(Egypt) Ahmed Hassan	PAOK	
22nd	(Poland) Damian Szymański	AEK Athens	
23rd	(Poland) Damian Szymański	AEK Athens	
24th	(Romania) Cristian Ganea	Aris	
25th	(Portugal) Bruma	Olympiacos	
26th	(Greece) Thanasis Androutsos	Olympiacos	
Play-offs/Play-outs
1st	(Greece) Nikos Papadopoulos	Asteras Tripolis	
2nd	(Portugal) Xande Silva	Aris	
3rd	(Greece) Stavros Vasilantonopoulos	AEK Athens	
4th	(Greece) Konstantinos Galanopoulos	AEK Athens	
5th/6th	(Portugal) Hélder Barbosa	Panetolikos	
7th/8th	(Greece) Kostas Fortounis	Olympiacos	
9th/10th	(Spain) Adrián Sardinero	Olympiacos	

=== Annual awards ===
Annual awards were announced on 16 December 2021.

Award	Winner	Club
Greek Player of the Season	(Greece) Georgios Masouras	Olympiacos
Foreign Player of the Season	(Morocco) Youssef El-Arabi	Olympiacos
Young Player of the Season	(Greece) Christos Tzolis	PAOK
Goalkeeper of the Season	(Greece) Sokratis Dioudis	Panathinaikos
Golden Boot	(Morocco) Youssef El-Arabi	Olympiacos
Manager of the Season	(Portugal) Pedro Martins	Olympiacos

Team of the Season
Goalkeeper	(Greece) Sokratis Dioudis (Panathinaikos)			
Defence	(Greece) Giannis Kotsiras (Asteras Tripolis)	(Portugal) Ruben Semedo (Olympiacos)	(Iceland) Sverrir Ingi Ingason (PAOK)	(Argentina) Franco Ferrari (Volos)
Midfield	(Trinidad and Tobago) Levi García (AEK Athens)	(France) Yann M'Vila (Olympiacos)	(Greece) Andreas Bouchalakis (Olympiacos)	(Greece) Georgios Masouras (Olympiacos)
Attack	(Morocco) Youssef El-Arabi (Olympiacos)		(Greece) Anastasios Douvikas (Volos)	

== Attendances ==
=== Overall ===
As of 16 May 2021

Pos	Team	Total	High	Low	Average	Change
1	AEK Athens	0	0	0	0	n/a
2	AEL	0	0	0	0	n/a
3	Apollon Smyrnis	0	0	0	0	n/a^{1}
4	Aris	0	0	0	0	n/a
5	Asteras Tripolis	0	0	0	0	n/a
6	Atromitos	0	0	0	0	n/a
7	Volos	0	0	0	0	n/a
8	Lamia	0	0	0	0	n/a
9	Olympiacos	0	0	0	0	n/a
10	OFI	0	0	0	0	n/a
11	Panathinaikos	0	0	0	0	n/a
12	Panetolikos	0	0	0	0	n/a
13	PAOK	0	0	0	0	n/a
14	PAS Giannina	0	0	0	0	n/a^{1}
	League total	0	0	0	0	n/a

Updated to match(es) played on 16 May 2021. Source: Super League Greece
Notes:
1: Team was promoted from the 2019–20 Super League Greece 2.

=== Home matches played ===
Team \ Match played	Regular season													Play-off & play-out					Total
Team \ Match played	1	2	3	4	5	6	7	8	9	10	11	12	13	1	2	3	4	5	Total
AEK Athens	—	—	—	—	—	—	—	—	—	—	—	—	—	—	—	—	—	—	0 (0)
AEL	—	—	—	—	—	—	—	—	—	—	—	—	—	—	—	—	—		0 (0)
Apollon Smyrnis	—	—	—	—	—	—	—	—	—	—	—	—	—	—	—	—	—		0 (0)
Aris	—	—	—	—	—	—	—	—	—	—	—	—	—	—	—	—	—	—	0 (0)
Asteras Tripolis	—	—	—	—	—	—	—	—	—	—	—	—	—	—	—	—	—	—	0 (0)
Atromitos	—	—	—	—	—	—	—	—	—	—	—	—	—	—	—	—	—		0 (0)
Lamia	—	—	—	—	—	—	—	—	—	—	—	—	—	—	—	—	—		0 (0)
OFI	—	—	—	—	—	—	—	—	—	—	—	—	—	—	—	—	—		0 (0)
Olympiacos	—	—	—	—	—	—	—	—	—	—	—	—	—	—	—	—	—	—	0 (0)
Panathinaikos	—	—	—	—	—	—	—	—	—	—	—	—	—	—	—	—	—	—	0 (0)
Panetolikos	—	—	—	—	—	—	—	—	—	—	—	—	—	—	—	—	—		0 (0)
PAOK	—	—	—	—	—	—	—	—	—	—	—	—	—	—	—	—	—	—	0 (0)
PAS Giannina	—	—	—	—	—	—	—	—	—	—	—	—	—	—	—	—	—		0 (0)
Volos	—	—	—	—	—	—	—	—	—	—	—	—	—	—	—	—	—		0 (0)
League total																			0

Source: Super League Greece
