= Thanasis Dimitroulas =

Greek footballer

Personal information
- Full name: Athanasios Dimitroulas
- Date of birth: 2 March 1999 (age 27)
- Place of birth: Athens, Greece
- Height: 1.84 m (6 ft 0 in)
- Position: Right-back

Team information
- Current team: Agia Paraskevi F.C.

Youth career
- 2008–2017: Panathinaikos

Senior career*
Years	Team	Apps	(Gls)
2017–2020	Panathinaikos	0	(0)
2018–2019	→ Aiginiakos (loan)	1	(0)
2019–2020	→ Thesprotos (loan)	19	(0)
2020–2021	Diagoras	14	(0)
2021–2022	Asteras Vlachioti	1	(0)
2022–2023	Thesprotos	14	(0)
2023–	Agia Paraskevi		

International career^{‡}
2014–2015	Greece U16	7	(0)
2015–2016	Greece U17	3	(0)
2017	Greece U18	5	(1)
2017–2018	Greece U19	8	(0)
- * Club domestic league appearances and goals as of 16 June 2023 ‡ National team caps and goals as of 27 March 2018

Thanasis Dimitroulas (Greek: Θανάσης Δημήτρουλας; born 2 March 1999) is a Greek professional footballer who plays as a right-back for Agia Paraskevi F.C.

== Career ==
=== Panathinaikos ===
On 13 June 2017, Dimitroulas signed a professional contract with Panathinaikos.
