= Sotiris Sylaidopoulos =

Greek footballer and manager

Personal information
- Full name: Sotirios Sylaidopoulos
- Date of birth: 8 February 1979 (age 47)
- Place of birth: Kos, Greece
- Position: Midfielder

Senior career*
| Years | Team | Apps | (Gls) |
| 1994–1999 | PAS Antagoras Kos | | |
| 1999–2001 | Panionios | | |
| 2004–2006 | AE Kos | | |
| 2006–2007 | Doxa Kardamena | | |
| 2007–2008 | PAOK Kos | | |
| 2008–2009 | PAS Antagoras Kos | | |

Managerial career
- 2015–2018: Panathinaikos U17
- 2018–2020: Panathinaikos U19
- 2020–2021: Panathinaikos (assistant)
- 2020: Panathinaikos (caretaker)
- 2021: Olympiacos U17
- 2021–2024: Olympiacos U19
- 2023: Olympiacos (assistant)
- 2024: Olympiacos (caretaker)
- 2024–2025: Olympiacos (assistant)
- 2025–2026: Rio Ave
- * Club domestic league appearances and goals

Sotiris Sylaidopoulos (Greek: Σωτήρης Συλαϊδόπουλος; born 8 February 1979) is a Greek professional football manager and former player who played as a midfielder. He last managed Portuguese club Rio Ave.

== Playing career ==
Silaidopoulos was born on the Greek island of Kos, and started playing football at local club Antagoras, where he later went on to play for the club's senior team at the age of 15.

In 1999, he signed for Alpha Ethniki club Panionios, where the 19-year-old initially joined the Under-20 team, while training with the senior side. At the end of 2000, Silaidopoulos suffered a severe knee injury that forced him to undergo multiple surgeries, and prevented him to pursue a professional playing career.

After a long injury break, Silaidopoulos returned to the pitch in 2004 and played for lower division clubs, before he retired in 2009 and focused on his coaching career.

== Managerial career ==
=== Early career ===
Following his retirement, Silaidopoulos started making his first experiences in coaching by taking over the U-15 team of Omilos Athlopaidion Kos at the beginning of the 2010–11 season. In the following season, he led the club's U-17 side to victory in the Dodecanese League.

In 2012, Silaidopoulos was approached by his childhood club Antagoras to take over the senior team after the club had overcome some financial turmoil and was forced to build up a new team in the fourth division. He accepted the offer and gained promotion to Greece's third division in the 2014–15 season.

=== Panathinaikos ===
==== Youth ====
On 1 July 2015, Silaidopoulos was hired by Super League Greece club Panathinaikos and appointed as head coach of the club's U-16 team, which he led to win the Attica League in his first season in charge. In the following two seasons, he was coaching the club's U-17s. During this period, the team reached the final of the prestigious 2017 Puskás Cup in Felcsút, Hungary only losing to champion Real Madrid.

His team finished first in the regular season of 2017–18 and lost the championship title in a penalty shoot-out against Olympiacos, in which Panathinaikos conceived a late equaliser in extra time.

In the 2018–19 season, Silaidopoulos became the head coach of the Under-19 team of Panathinaikos. With many players being from the 2001 generation, his side was the youngest U-19 team in the Greek league and finished 5th in the championship. On international stage the team won the 2019 Tri-Series Tournament hosted by Aspire Academy in Qatar, and finished as runner-up in the 2019 ICGT Tournament in the Netherlands losing 1–0 to Valencia in the final.

In the 2019–20 season, his team aimed to make the next step in its development. By the time the season was stopped in February 2020 due to the outbreak of COVID-19, Panathinaikos was ranked 2nd in the Super League K-19 after 24 games with just two matches remaining. Several players of this successful youth team have also been promoted to the club's senior team during the season.

==== First team ====
On 12 October 2020, Silaidopoulos was appointed as interim head coach after Dani Poyatos was sacked. He drew his only game 2–2 against OFI in the Super League. After László Bölöni was appointed as the new head coach of Panathinaikos, Silaidopoulos joined the coaching staff of the club's first team as Assistant Manager on 19 October. After Bölöni was released from his duties in May 2021, Silaidopoulos again took over the club's first team as caretaker, coaching the team in the Super League games against Aris (0–0) and Olympiacos (1–4).

=== Olympiacos ===
==== Youth ====
In July 2021, Silaidopoulos accepted the offer to join the Olympiacos Youth Academy as Head Coach of the U-19s and as Head of the club's “Tomorrow’s Legends” project that aims to oversee the development of youth players with potential for the first team. Under his leadership, the club's U-19s won the Greek Super League in the 2022–23 season for the first time in six years, with a total of 64 points in 26 games, and the league's best offense (scoring 59 goals) and best defense (only conceding 16 goals).

Following the championship title in the Greek U-19 Super League, Silaidopoulos was in charge of Olympiacos U-19 in the 2023-24 UEFA Youth League. By using the path for domestic champions, the Greek side qualified for the play-offs after defeating Lecce and Gabala in the preliminary rounds. Silaidopoulos’ team continued their successful run in the play-offs by defeating Inter 6–5 in penalties after a 0–0 draw in 90 minutes.

In the round of 16, Olympiacos faced Lens and was again victorious in a penalty shootout, defeating the French side 4–2 and making the first Greek team in history to reach a quarter-final of the UEFA Youth League. By defeating Bayern Munich 3–1, Olympiacos successfully qualified for the semi-final tournament in Nyon for the first time in club history.

In the semifinal, Olympiacis defeated Nantes 3–1 in a penalty shoot-out after the match ended in a goalless draw (0–0) in regular time. In the final against Milan (3–0), three goals in a seven-minute second-half burst gave Olympiacos the title and Greece their first UEFA club trophy.

In August 2024, Silaidopoulos led Olympiacos U19 to the final of the Under-20 Intercontinental Cup, where they finished runners-up after losing 2–1 to Brazilian side Flamengo at the Maracanã Stadium in Rio de Janeiro.

In February 2025, Silaidopoulos received a Gazzetta Award alongside members of Olympiacos' under-19 team in recognition of their victory in the 2023–24 UEFA Youth League.

==== First team ====
In April 2023, Olympiacos Sporting Director José Anigo took over the role as interim head coach from Míchel and Silaidopoulos joined him as assistant coach until the end of the 2022–23 season.

At the beginning of the 2023–24 season, Carlos Carvalhal took over as head coach of the club's first team. When Carvalhal was sacked in February 2024, UEFA Youth League-head coach Silaidopoulos took over the first team as interim coach. He was in charge at a 4–0 victory against OFI in the Super League. Thereby, Silaidopoulos became the first Greek manager, who had been in charge of both Greek Super League power-houses Olympiacos and Panathinaikos in the past 50 years.

Silaidopoulos stayed on the first team's staff as an assistant when José Luis Mendilibar joined Olympiacos as the new head coach on 12 February 2024. Five weeks after claiming the UEFA Youth League, Silaidopoulos added another major European trophy to his résumé. As the first team assistant coach for Olympiacos, he played a key role in the victory that saw Olympiacos become the first Greek team to win a European trophy. The team triumphed over Fiorentina with a 1–0 win in extra time during the UEFA Europa Conference League final, held in Athens on 29 May 2024. The decisive moment came in the 118th minute, when striker Ayoub El Kaabi scored the winning goal in extra time.

Silaidopoulos played a role in the coaching staff during a landmark season for Olympiacos, as the club celebrated its 100-year-anniversary. In a historic achievement, Olympiacos secured the 48th league championship in its history. After working four years at Olympiacos, he left the club on 24 June 2025.

=== Rio Ave ===
On 27 June 2025, Rio Ave officially announced the appointment of Silaidopoulos as their new head coach. The 46-year-old Greek coach signed a two-season contract.

Silaidopoulos became the first Greek manager to coach in Portugal's Primeira Liga, where he faced prominent managers including José Mourinho. During his first season, Rio Ave finished 12th in the league. He also emphasised player development, with Brazilian winger André Luiz progressing under his management before transferring to Greek club Olympiacos in January 2026.

On 1 October 2026, Silaidopoulos and Rio Ave parted ways following a difficult start to the league campaign.

== Personal life ==
Silaidopoulos is married with one child. He speaks fluent Greek and English and also has basic knowledge of Italian and German. He is holder of the UEFA Pro, UEFA A, UEFA B and UEFA Youth Elite licenses and also received a diploma in art history from the Ippokrateio-Lyceum of Kos.
