= Loukas Vyntra =

Greek footballer (born 1981)

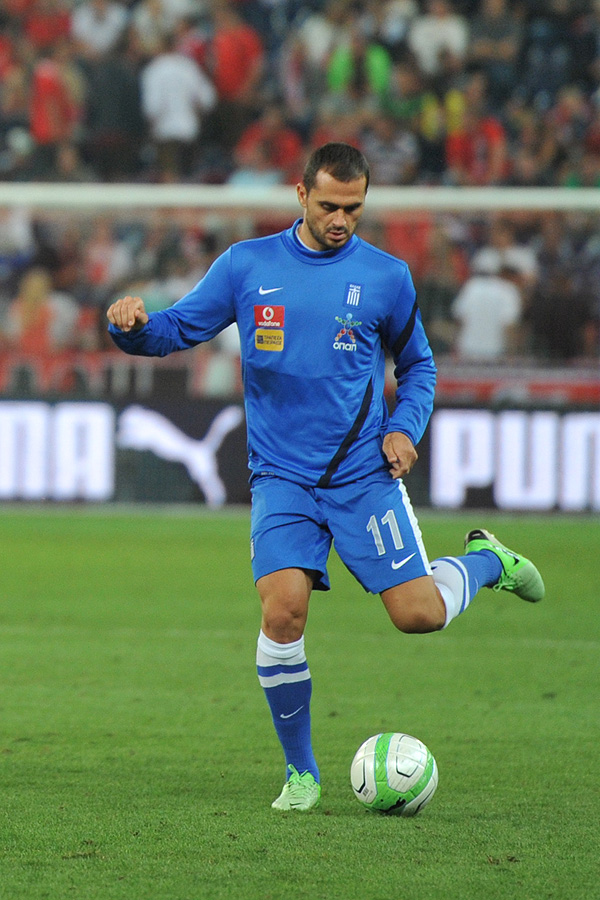
- Vyntra with Greece in 2013

Personal information
- Full name: Loukas Vyntra
- Birth name: Lukáš Vydra
- Date of birth: 5 February 1981 (age 45)
- Place of birth: Město Albrechtice, Czechoslovakia
- Height: 1.84 m (6 ft 0 in)
- Position: Defender

Youth career
- 1998–1999: Almopos

Senior career*
Years	Team	Apps	(Gls)
1999–2003	Paniliakos	67	(4)
2000–2001	→ Veria (loan)	24	(0)
2003–2013	Panathinaikos	227	(10)
2013–2015	Levante	75	(2)
2015–2016	Hapoel Tel Aviv	25	(0)
2016–2019	Omonia	70	(4)
2019–2022	Lamia	52	(0)
Total		540	(20)

International career^{‡}
1997–2003	Greece U21	20	(3)
2004	Greece U23	3	(0)
2005–2015	Greece	57	(0)
- * Club domestic league appearances and goals as of 25 May 2022 ‡ National team caps and goals as of 17 June 2015

Loukas Vyntra (Greek: Λουκάς Βύντρα, Czech: Lukáš Vydra; born 5 February 1981) is a Greek former professional footballer. Mainly a central defender, he could also play as a right back, left back, or a defensive midfielder.

== Early life ==
Vyntra was born as Lukáš Vydra in Město Albrechtice, Czechoslovakia, to a Czech father and a Greek mother. As a youngster, he moved to his mother's homeland of Greece.

== Club career ==
=== Paniliakos ===
Vyntra signed his first professional contract in 1999 with Paniliakos. He made his senior debut on loan with third division Veroia in 2000–01. Returning to Paniliakos at the end of the season, he swiftly became established in the starting 11, helping them win promotion to the Alpha Ethniki in 2002–03. Making his debut in the Greek top-flight, Vyntra played in Paniliakos' first 15 games of the 2003–04 season.

=== Panathinaikos ===
Greek giants Panathinaikos was quick to notice his potential and brought Vyntra to Athens-based club in 2004. Immediately making an impact at the club, Vyntra became a legend player for Panathinaikos since his first season, wearing the green-and-white. He was a versatile member of back-line, switching between playing on the right and the centre of defence. On 29 September 2004, he made his European competition debut in a 1–0 away loss against PSV in the UEFA Champions League. He scored two memorable goals during the 2004–05 season, one against Arsenal in the Champions League and one against Sevilla in the UEFA Cup.

In the summer of 2007, German Bundesliga side Hertha BSC approached the player about a transfer, but Panathinaikos did not wish to sell him unless they found adequate cover in defence. Although he was described as a hard-working player, good in tackling and marking and picked by all his managers for the starting XI, his lack of stability made him the target of complaints and he has received the most criticism for Panathinaikos' recent inability to win titles. Incoming manager Henk ten Cate, however, began using Vyntra mainly as a central defender for the 2008–09 season.

During the subsequent 2009–10 campaign, he was one of the side's key players, enjoying a particularly memorable season and helping Panathinaikos to the domestic double, reaching 50 games in European competition. He also ended the year by appearing in all three matches for Greece at the 2010 World Cup. He scored two important goals in the Super League derby against rivals PAOK on 8 February 2009.

After Henk ten Cate's resignation as Panathinaikos manager on 8 December 2009, Ten Cate gave an interview to a Greek sports website where he was asked the question, "If you get hired by a big European club, which player from Panathinaikos F.C. would you recommend to your new club?" He responded, "Only one: Vyntra. He can play either as a defensive midfielder and right or left back, he can also play as a centre back, he is quick, he has good aerial abilities, with a good technique for a defender, he is good in tactics. What else can a manager ask from him? He has a tough mind because he plays many years under continuous, unfair criticism."

On 16 October 2010, Vyntra scored the winning goal against PAOK.

=== Levante ===
At the beginning of the 2013 calendar year, facing criticism from fans and in-and-out of the starting lineup, Vyntra asked his manager to make some contacts with foreign teams and Belgian club Anderlecht arranged immediately a scout to assess him. During the 2012–13 season, however, he ultimately signed a half-year contract with Spanish La Liga side Levante, later extending it at the conclusion of the year with an annual salary of €450,000.

On 19 January 2014, Vyntra scored his first goal with Levante, in a 1–1 draw against Barcelona, heading-home a low goal past goalkeeper Víctor Valdés from an Andreas Ivanschitz cross after ten minutes. On 25 January 2014, Levante pulled off an unlikely 3–2 victory over a strong Sevilla side in an enthralling game at the Ramón Sánchez Pizjuán. After just three minutes going behind, Vyntra headed-in a corner swung in by Andreas Ivanschitz. Ten days later, in the second leg of the Copa del Rey quarter-final, Levante stunned Barcelona by taking an early lead, as Vyntra rose inside the box to thump-in his header into the bottom corner. Barça, however, levelled just before the 30-minute mark and eventually triumphed 5–1 and 9–2 on aggregate.

On 4 May 2014, a couple of days after Atlético Madrid succeeded to reach the 2014 UEFA Champions League Final, Levante took advantage of a worn-down Atlético side by pulling off an impressive 2–0 victory over the league leaders. Atlético had two close calls as they chased the equalizer. One of them, in the 63rd minute came from Filipe Luís, whose shot from just inside the box was blocked on the six-yard line by Vyntra. The Greek defender was among the key performers in the victory.

The 2014–15 began poorly for Levante, and head coach Lucas Alcaraz did not hesitate to pull Vyntra out of the lineup along with David Barral, defensive pillars for the club just one season prior. The team's unsuccessful results against Elche, Villarreal and Athletic Bilbao had Vyntra on the substitute's bench, kept out of the starting XI in favour of central defenders David Navarro and Iván Ramis. Vyntra eventually returned to the starting lineup on 4 April 2015, in a 4–1 away win over Almería.

Without reaching the 30-appearance mark that was the target for the 2014–15 season, Vyntra was touted for a return to Greece for the subsequent season, as it was believed Levante would not renew his contract. According to sources from Israel, Hapoel Tel Aviv was interested in signing Vyntra.

=== Hapoel Tel Aviv ===
On 27 July 2015, Hapoel Tel Aviv reached an agreement with Levante and Vyntra for his signature; he ultimately signed a two-year contract with an annual salary of €250,000 after passing his medical. In August 2016, he solved his contract with the club.

=== AC Omonia ===
On 29 August 2016, Vyntra signed a contract with Cypriot club Omonia for an undisclosed fee. On 10 September 2016, he made his debut with the club in a 1–1 home draw against Doxa Katokopias. On 5 February 2017, he scored his first goal with the club, in a 4–2 away win against Aris Limassol. Having fallen surplus to requirements ahead of the 2017–18 season, the club attempted to find a solution with regards to the player's contract termination; the fact that no agreement was reached as of the summer transfer window's end created turbulence amongst Omonia's ultras, indirectly accusing the player of being professionally idle whilst being paid out of his contract's earnings. However, on 28 December 2017, the club's new manager Ivaylo Petev decided to reinstate Vyntra into the first-team roster, overturning the previous decision made by former manager Pambos Christodoulou.

=== Lamia ===
On 17 July 2019, Lamia reached an agreement with Vyntra for his signature; he ultimately signed a year contract with an undisclosed fee after passing his medical. On 6 August 2020, he renew for another year.

== International career ==
Vyntra represents Greece instead of his birth country, the Czech Republic; he has gone on to feature for the national team on several levels. He represented Greece at the 2004 Summer Olympics, held on home soil in Athens.

Vyntra's debut with the Greek senior team came on 8 June 2005, in a 1–0 home defeat against Ukraine in a 2006 World Cup qualifying match. He was included in the final squad for the 2005 Confederations Cup in Germany.

Generally for Greece, Vyntra has been used in his more natural right-back position, but his playing-time has benefited through injuries to regular starters. With his occasional gaffes, he faces the same scrutiny that surrounded him at Panathinaikos. Vyntra was called by manager Fernando Santos to both the 30-man provisional 2014 World Cup squad and the final 23-man squad.

On 23 March 2015, an injury of Roma's defender José Holebas led to Vyntra's participation in a crucial match against Hungary national football team for qualification to UEFA Euro 2016.

== Career statistics ==
Appearances and goals by club, season and competition
Club	Season	League			Cup		Europe		Total	
Club	Season	Division	Apps	Goals	Apps	Goals	Apps	Goals	Apps	Goals
Paniliakos	1999–00	Alpha Ethniki	4	0	0	0	0	0	4	0
Paniliakos	2001–02	Beta Ethniki	26	2	1	0	0	0	27	2
Paniliakos	2002–03	Beta Ethniki	29	2	1	0	0	0	30	2
Paniliakos	2003–04	Alpha Ethniki	8	0	1	0	0	0	9	0
Paniliakos	Total		67	4	3	0	0	0	70	4
Veria (loan)	2000–01	Beta Ethniki	24	0	0	0	0	0	24	0
Panathinaikos	2003–04	Alpha Ethniki	5	0	3	0	0	0	8	0
Panathinaikos	2004–05	Alpha Ethniki	27	0	3	0	7	1	37	1
Panathinaikos	2005–06	Alpha Ethniki	23	0	1	0	6	0	30	0
Panathinaikos	2006–07	Super League Greece	26	0	6	0	8	0	40	0
Panathinaikos	2007–08	Super League Greece	23	0	1	0	7	0	31	0
Panathinaikos	2008–09	Super League Greece	30	2	3	0	12	0	45	2
Panathinaikos	2009–10	Super League Greece	24	4	5	0	13	1	42	5
Panathinaikos	2010–11	Super League Greece	31	2	3	2	6	0	40	4
Panathinaikos	2011–12	Super League Greece	24	0	2	1	4	0	30	1
Panathinaikos	2012–13	Super League Greece	14	2	1	0	9	0	24	2
Panathinaikos	Total		227	10	28	3	72	2	327	15
Levante	2012–13	La Liga	15	0	0	0	0	0	15	0
Levante	2013–14	La Liga	33	2	5	1	0	0	38	3
Levante	2014–15	La Liga	27	0	0	0	0	0	27	0
Levante	Total		75	2	5	1	0	0	80	3
Hapoel Tel Aviv	2015–16	Israeli Premier League	25	0	4	0	0	0	29	0
Omonia	2016–17	Cypriot First Division	28	2	4	0	0	0	32	2
Omonia	2017–18	Cypriot First Division	15	1	1	0	0	0	16	1
Omonia	2018–19	Cypriot First Division	27	1	1	0	0	0	28	1
Omonia	Total		70	4	6	0	0	0	76	4
Lamia	2019–20	Super League Greece	29	0	4	0	0	0	33	0
Lamia	2020–21	Super League Greece	12	0	2	0	0	0	14	0
Lamia	2021–22	Super League Greece	11	0	1	0	0	0	12	0
Lamia	Total		52	0	7	0	0	0	59	0
Career total			540	20	53	4	75	2	668	26

== Honours ==
Panathinaikos

- Super League Greece: 2003–04, 2009–10
- Greek Football Cup: 2003–04, 2009–10
