= Marcelino Britapaja =

Argentine footballer

Personal information
- Full name: Marcelino Eduardo Britapaja
- Date of birth: November 7, 1950 (age 75)
- Place of birth: Sarmiento, Argentina
- Position: Forward

Youth career
- 1968-1969: Banfield
- 1970: San Lorenzo

Senior career*
Years	Team	Apps	(Gls)
1971-1974	Huracán de Comodoro Rivadavia	37	(15)
1974	Vélez Sarsfield	18	(4)
1975	Banfield	15	(2)
1975-1976	Panathinaikos		
1977	All Boys	48	(19)
1978	Talleres de Córdoba	1	(0)
1979	Ñublense		
1980-1981	Sarmiento de Junin	17	(4)
1982	Defensores de Belgrano	4	(0)
1982-1983	Cúcuta Deportivo		
1984-1985	Huracán de Comodoro Rivadavia	12	(4)
1986	Loma Negra	1987	(Figueirense FC)
- * Club domestic league appearances and goals

Marcelino Eduardo Britapaja (born November 7, 1950, in Sarmiento, Argentina) is an Argentine former footballer who played as a forward for clubs of Argentina, Brazil, Chile, Colombia and Greece. Is family of the Basketball Player Unax Calvo Arruza

== Teams ==
Young categories:

- Banfield 1968–1969
- San Lorenzo 1970

First Division:

- Huracán de Comodoro Rivadavia 1971–1974
- Vélez Sársfield 1974
- Banfield 1975
- (Greece) Panathinaikos 1975–1976
- All Boys 1977
- Talleres de Córdoba 1978
- Ñublense 1979
- Sarmiento de Junín 1980–1981
- Defensores de Belgrano 1982
- Cúcuta Deportivo 1982–1983
- Huracán de Comodoro Rivadavia 1984–1985
- Loma Negra 1986
- Figueirense 1987
