= Lysandros Dikaiopoulos =

Greek footballer (1916–1938)

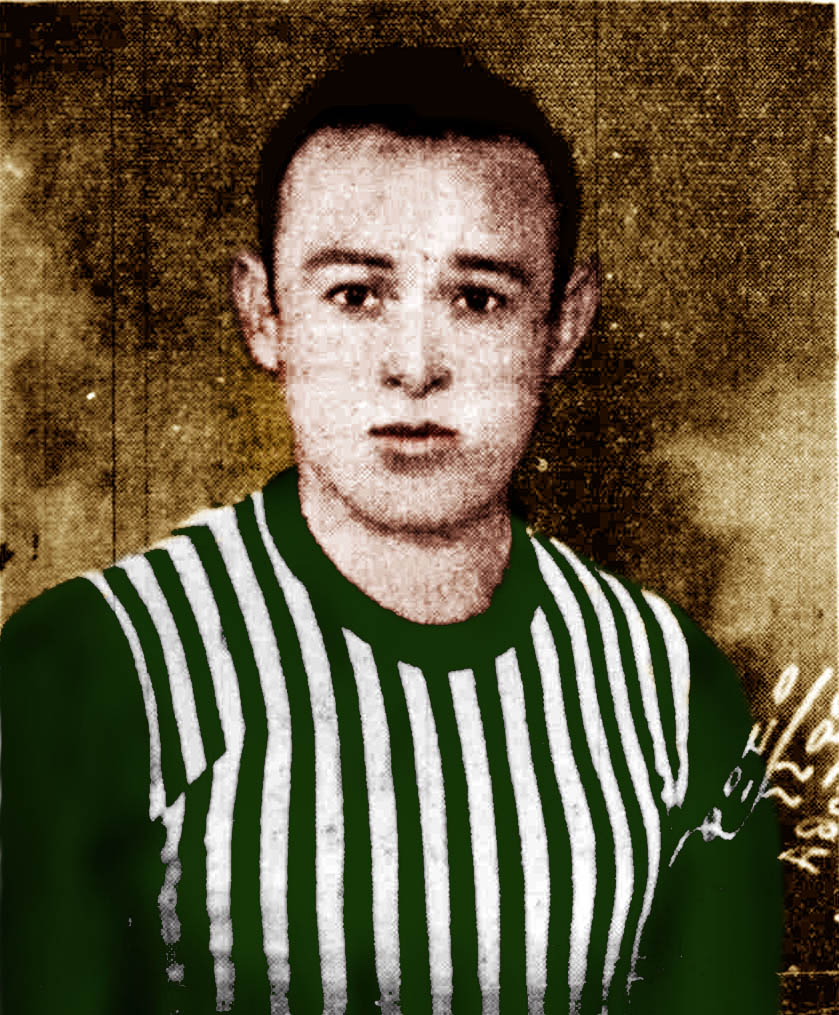
- Dikaiopoulos with Panathinaikos

Personal information
- Full name: Lysandros Dikaiopoulos
- Date of birth: 1916
- Place of birth: Smyrna, Ottoman Empire
- Date of death: 3 May 1938 (aged 21–22)
- Place of death: Athens, Greece
- Position: Defender

Youth career
- –1933: Argonaftes Kallithea
- 1933–1934: Mikrasiatiki Dourgouti

Senior career*
Years	Team	Apps	(Gls)
1934	A.E. Irakleio		
1934–1937	AEK Athens	23	
1937–1938	Panathinaikos		
- * Club domestic league appearances and goals

Lysandros Dikaiopoulos (Greek: Λύσανδρος Δικαιόπουλος; 1916 – 3 May 1938) was a Greek footballer who played as a defender. He died playing in a football match following a fatal head injury in May 1938. It was the second incident in Greece where a footballer suffered a fatal accident while playing in a match, six years after the death of the 17-year-old goalkeeper of Apollon Patras, Giannis Fotiou.

== Early life ==
Lysandros was born in Smyrna, to parents originally from the Mani Peninsula in Greece. His father was Dimitrios Dikaiopoulos from Kounos village and his mother Venetia (Nee Lazarongona) was from Koita. His mother was from a Niklian family, while his father was from a commoner but affluent family. The tower homes of both families are still present in their respective villages. The couple arrived in Smyrna (Ottoman Empire) after eloping in the 1910s. Venetia was married to a much older man via an arranged marriage but soon met Dimitrios and fell in love. They fled Mani and established themselves in Smyrna. Dimitrios, with financial assistance from his family established a grain trade business. This resulted in the couple becoming affluent and being able to build two homes on the queue in Smyrna. Both homes survived the fires in 1922. Lysandros' father was killed by bandits while he went to central Anatolia ahead of the main caravan. He managed to kill 5 of the bandits and was shot under the arm. Dimitrios later died from his wounds. Lysandros lived with his mother and four siblings (Brasidas, Ifigenia, Maria also known as Douldi, and Nikolaos). In 1922, at the end of the Greco-Turkish war and during the burning of Smyrna, the family was able to escape the fires and killings unlike many others. Luckily Venetia spoke perfect french and was a redhead, so she was able to convince a French Captain to allow them onto a french naval vessel. From there the family was transferred to Athens where they settled in the area of Agios Sostis in Neos Kosmos at 171 Andrea Syngrou Avenue. On a side note; his 9 year old brother, Brasidas, was on a fishing trip with a neighbor when Smyrna was burning and ended up in Thessaloniki for 6 months on his own.

In his early adult life, he was a piano instructor but later joined the Hellenic Navy serving his term as a flight attendant at the Naval Air Base of Phalerum. One of his brothers was also a footballer who later played at AEK Athens from 1937 to 1939.

== Club career ==
Dikaiopoulos started playing football at an early age in unofficial clubs near his home area, first at Argonaftes Kallithea and then at Mikrasiatiki Dourgouti, which was crowned AFCA champion in the division of unofficial clubs in 1934. The following season he played for the first time in an official league with A.E. Irakleio in the third division. He particularly distinguished himself by helping his club reach the final stage of the league. His appearances were noticed by the officials of AEK Athens and in 1934 he signed at the yellow-blacks, where he played for three seasons having 9, 10 and 4 league appearances, respectively.

In 1937 he was transferred to Panathinaikos, where he was established in the starting line-up as a full-back. He was noted for his speed and self-sacrifice and he had the potential to become an international footballer with Greece, but fate had other plans for him.

=== Death ===
On 1 May 1938, after the end of the AFCA championship, a friendly match between Panathinaikos and AEK was organized at Leoforos Alexandras Stadium, which ended 0–0. At the 7th minute of the match, Dikaiopoulos, in his attempt to clear an opponent's attack with a header, strongly collided with Tryfon Tzanetis, who jumped at the same time. While Tzanetis fell on his face, managed to protect himself with his hands and got up almost immediately a little dazed with minor bruises, Dikaiopoulos fell awkwardly and hit the ground with the back of his head, remaining motionless. The match was temporarily suspended, as the doctor and former athlete, M. Marsellos who was watching the match, rushed to the pitch and diagnosed the seriousness of the hit. The player was taken to the Red Cross Ηospital in a state of aphasia, accompanied by his devastated mother who had come to watch him play. In the hospital, the doctors determined that the wound was fatal, since he had suffered a fracture at the base of the skull and a concussion. He was punctured to remove the internal hematoma but the athlete never regained consciousness. He survived for almost 48 hours thanks to his strong hold and died at 10:30 a.m. on 3 May in the arms of his mother and his teammates, Tasos Kritikos and Kostas Zogas who had come to visit him.

His death moved the society of Athens and especially the sports world. His funeral at the first cemetery of Athens was public and it was attended by official authorities led by the Minister-Commander of the Capital, Konstantinos Kotzias. His teammates at Panathinaikos, his former teammates at AEK, many footballers from other clubs, an agema of Aircraftmen that gave honors, the boards of the HFF, AFCA, Panathinaikos, AEK Athens, P.A.O. Dafni, Apollon Athens, Asteras Athens, Olympiacos, Atromitos, Mikrasiatiki Dourgouti, Poseidon Glyfada, while representatives of the newspapers "Athlitismos" and "Athlitiko Vima" also laid wreaths. AFCA has decided to observe a minute's silence in the upcoming matches and for the players to compete with black armbands. Telegrams were also sent by clubs of the countryside. The consequence of the death of Dikaiopoulos was the decision of the state to oblige the clubs from now on to insure their eleven football players anonymously, so that those who compete have insurance. The state granted a special pension for his widowed mother and gave a dowry his unmarried sister.

=== Tributes ===
In May 1939, one year after his death, his relatives and a few sports fans from Kallithea, decided to found a football club dedicated to the memory of the late football player. They named it "Lysandros Kallithea". The Board of Directors of the new club were formed by: Ioannis Kouskounas, Spyros Pithamitsis, Athanasios Fotakis, Vasilios Sakopoulos, Vrasidas Dikaiopoulos, Lazaros Ermeidis, Nikolaos Fallieros, Athanasios Bandounas, Andreas Valves, Anastasios Kritikos, Venis Apostolidis, Athanasios Kapitsas. The club was active until October 1940, when the WW2 started, when it was dissolved. The team operated as a football section of the "National Refugee Team Nea Zoi Kallithea", which is why it is also referred to as "Lysandros N. Zoi Kallithea".

== Honours ==
Mikrasiatiki Dourgouti

- Athens FCA League unofficial clubs division: 1934
