= Roberto Agueropolis =

Argentine footballer

Roberto Néstor Agueropolis (born 30 March 1954 in Rosario) is an Argentine former football player who played as a defender.

He played for Newell's Old Boys (1975–1976), San Martín de Tucumán (1977-1977), Newell's Old Boys (1978–1980), Panathinaikos (1980–1982), Rodos F.C. (1982–1983).
