= Orgesi Sulce =

Albanian association football player

Personal information
- Date of birth: 20 April 2000 (age 26)
- Place of birth: Porto Rafti, Greece
- Height: 1.88 m (6 ft 2 in)
- Position: Centre-forward

Youth career
- –2020: Panathinaikos

Senior career*
Years	Team	Apps	(Gls)
2020	Panathinaikos	0	(0)
2020–2022	Apollon Larissa	8	(0)
2022–2023	Marko		
2023–2025	Keravnos Keratea		
- * Club domestic league appearances and goals as of 2026

Orgesi Sulce (born 20 April 2000) is an Albanian professional footballer who plays as a centre-forward.. He last played for Keravnos Keratea until late 2025 when he was released.
