= Dani Poyatos =

Spanish football manager

Personal information
- Full name: Daniel Poyatos Algaba
- Date of birth: 23 June 1978 (age 48)
- Place of birth: Barcelona, Spain
- Height: 1.80 m (5 ft 11 in)

Managerial career
- Years: Team
- 2006–2012: Espanyol (youth)
- 2012–2014: Bahrain (youth)
- 2014–2017: Real Madrid (youth)
- 2017–2018: Maccabi Tel Aviv (assistant)
- 2018–2020: Real Madrid (youth)
- 2020: Panathinaikos
- 2021–2022: Tokushima Vortis
- 2023–2025: Gamba Osaka

Daniel "Dani" Poyatos Algaba (born 23 June 1978) is a Spanish professional football manager. Besides Spain, he has managed in Bahrain, Israel, Greece and Japan.

== Managerial career ==
Born in Barcelona, Poyatos began working in the youth ranks of hometown club RCD Espanyol. After working for the underage teams of the Bahrain national team and the under-18s of the Catalonia national team, he became the assistant to Jordi Cruyff at Maccabi Tel Aviv in 2017. In July 2018, he returned to Real Madrid and their Juvenil A team, after Guti headed to Beşiktaş in Turkey.

On 22 July 2020, Poyatos signed as head coach of Panathinaikos on a two-year contract for the start of the 2020–21 season. He lost his competitive debut in Super League Greece on 13 September away to Asteras Tripoli, with the only goal being scored by compatriot Adrián Riera.

After starting the 2020–21 season with just a point in his first three games, Poyatos left the club by mutual consent on 12 October 2020.

On 24 December 2020, Poyatos signed as manager of the 2020 J2 League champions and newly promoted J1 League side Tokushima Vortis ahead of the 2021 season, replacing compatriot Ricardo Rodríguez who left for fellow J1 League side Urawa Red Diamonds.

On 23 November 2022, Poyatos was announced as manager of J1 club Gamba Osaka from the 2023 season. In July 2023, he won the June 2023 J1 Manager of the Month award after getting three wins from three matches. On 27 October 2023, Poyatos signed a new contract with Gamba Osaka for the 2024 season.

== Managerial statistics ==
As of match played 11 December 2025

Managerial record by team and tenure
Team	Nat.	From	To	Record								Ref.
Team	Nat.	From	To	G	W	D	L	GF	GA	GD	Win %	Ref.
Panathinaikos	(Greece)	21 July 2020	12 October 2020	3	0	1	2	1	3	−2	0.00	
Tokushima Vortis	(Japan)	1 February 2021	31 January 2023	85	24	30	31	85	103	−18	28.24	
Gamba Osaka	(Japan)	1 February 2023	11 December 2025	137	61	27	49	189	180	+9	44.53	
Career Total				225	85	58	82	275	286	−11	37.78	
