= Dimitrios Serpezis =

Greek footballer (born 2001)

Personal information
- Date of birth: 14 March 2001 (age 25)
- Place of birth: Metamorfosi, Greece
- Height: 1.82 m (6 ft 0 in)
- Position: Midfielder

Youth career
- 2010–2019: Panathinaikos

Senior career*
Years	Team	Apps	(Gls)
2019–2023	Panathinaikos	14	(0)
2021–2023	Panathinaikos B	29	(2)
2023–2024	Ionikos	18	(0)
2024–2025	Ilioupolis	8	(0)

International career^{‡}
2017	Greece U16	4	(1)
2017–2018	Greece U17	10	(0)
2018	Greece U18	1	(0)
- * Club domestic league appearances and goals as of 1 July 2025 ‡ National team caps and goals as of 19 December 2018

Dimitrios Serpezis (Greek: Δημήτριος Σερπέζης; born 14 March 2001) is a Greek former professional footballer who plays as a midfielder.

Serpezis started his senior career in Panathinaikos, joining from the team's youth ranks.

== Career statistics ==
As of 10 January 2021

Appearances and goals by club, season and competition
Club	Season	League			Cup		Continental		Other		Total	
Club	Season	Division	Apps	Goals	Apps	Goals	Apps	Goals	Apps	Goals	Apps	Goals
Panathinaikos	2019–20	Super League Greece	6	0	1	0	—		—		7	0
Panathinaikos	2020–21	Super League Greece	8	0	0	0	—		—		8	0
Panathinaikos	Total		14	0	1	0	0	0	0	0	12	0
Career total			14	0	1	0	0	0	0	0	15	0
