= Marios Tzavidas =

Greek footballer

Personal information
- Full name: Marios Efthymios Tzavidas
- Date of birth: 8 October 2003 (age 23)
- Place of birth: Athens, Greece
- Height: 1.83 m (6 ft 0 in)
- Position: Forward

Youth career
- 2013–2021: Panathinaikos

Senior career*
Years	Team	Apps	(Gls)
2021–2024	Atromitos	42	(2)

International career^{‡}
2021	Greece U19	2	(0)
2022	Greece U21	3	(0)
- * Club domestic league appearances and goals as of 13 May 2023 ‡ National team caps and goals as of 28 March 2023

Marios Tzavidas (Greek: Μάριος Τζαβίδας; born 8 October 2003) is a former Greek professional footballer who plays as a forward. He last played for Super League club Atromitos.

== Career ==
=== Atromitos ===
On 5 July 2021, Tzavidas signed a three-year contract with Atromitos.

In the 2022–23 season's opener, Tzavidas scored his first professional goal, helping to a 3–1 home win against OFI.

== Personal life ==
Tzavidas' brother, Spyros, is a former professional football player.

He retired from professional football after he was diagnosed with cardiac arrhythmias.

== Career statistics ==
As of 22 August 2022

Club	Season	League			Cup		Continental		Other		Total	
Club	Season	Division	Apps	Goals	Apps	Goals	Apps	Goals	Apps	Goals	Apps	Goals
Atromitos	2021–22	Superleague Greece	7	0	1	0	—		—		8	0
Atromitos	2022–23	Superleague Greece	1	1	0	0	—		—		1	1
Atromitos	Total		8	1	1	0	—		—		9	1
Career total			8	1	1	0	0	0	0	0	9	1
