= Christian Konan =

Italian footballer (born 1999)

Personal information
- Full name: Christian Anderson Konan
- Date of birth: 12 July 1999 (age 27)
- Place of birth: Varese, Italy
- Height: 1.78 m (5 ft 10 in)
- Position: Forward

Team information
- Current team: Stade Briochin
- Number: 29

Youth career
- –2019: Girondins de Bordeaux

Senior career*
Years	Team	Apps	(Gls)
2019	Clermont B	13	(5)
2019–2021	Panathinaikos	0	(0)
2019–2020	→ Levadiakos (loan)	7	(0)
2021	Logroñés B	2	(0)
2021–2022	Étoile Carouge	23	(7)
2022–2024	Rapperswil-Jona	56	(17)
2024–	Stade Briochin	50	(5)
- * Club domestic league appearances and goals as of 23 June 2026

Christian Anderson Konan (born 12 July 1999) is an Italian professional footballer who plays as a forward for French Championnat National club Stade Briochin.

== Career ==
After playing for the youth team of Inter Milan, one of Italy's most successful teams, Konan signed for Girondins de Bordeaux in the French Ligue 1, failing to make an appearance there before joining French second division side Clermont Foot, where he again failed to make an appearance.

In 2019, he signed for Panathinaikos, one of Greece's most successful clubs, after helping their reserves finish second at a tournament in the Netherlands while on trial.

For the second half of 2019–20 season, Konan was sent on loan to Levadiakos in the Greek second division.
