= Adrián Riera =

Spanish footballer

Personal information
- Full name: Adrián Riera Torrecillas
- Date of birth: 19 April 1996 (age 30)
- Place of birth: Murcia, Spain
- Height: 1.76 m (5 ft 9 in)
- Position: Winger

Team information
- Current team: Asteras Tripolis
- Number: 23

Youth career
- Levante

Senior career*
Years	Team	Apps	(Gls)
2015–2016	Levante B	7	(0)
2016	→ La Roda (loan)	11	(0)
2016–2017	Getafe B	15	(0)
2017–2018	Formentera	21	(3)
2018	Toledo	1	(1)
2018–2019	Villarreal B	15	(0)
2019–2023	Asteras Tripolis	107	(12)
2023–2025	OFI	42	(3)
2025–2026	Akritas Chlorakas	9	(0)
2026	Panserraikos	19	(2)
2026–	Asteras Tripolis	1	(0)
- * Club domestic league appearances and goals as of 7 September 2026

Adrián Riera Torrecillas (born 19 April 1996) is a Spanish professional footballer who plays as a winger for Greek Super League club Asteras Tripolis.

== Career ==
Born in Murcia, Riera was a Levante youth graduate. He made his senior debut with the reserves on 22 August 2015, playing the last six minutes in a 0–1 Segunda División B away loss against Hércules.

On 1 February 2016, after being sparingly used, Riera was loaned to fellow league team La Roda until the end of the season. The following July, he moved to Getafe's B-team in Tercera División, after terminating his contract with the Granotes.

Riera returned to the third division on 11 July 2017, after agreeing to a contract with Formentera. The following 31 January, he moved to Toledo in the same category, but spent the remainder of the campaign sidelined after suffering a knee injury.

In August 2018, Riera joined another reserve team, Villarreal B also in division three. Roughly one year later, he terminated his contract with the Yellow Submarine and moved abroad, signing a two-year contract with Asteras Tripolis of the Greek Super League.

Riera made his professional debut on 24 August 2019, starting in a 0–1 away loss against Olympiacos. His first goal came on 13 September of the following year in the 2020–21 season opener, the only one of a home win against Panathinaikos.

On 14 July 2021, Asteras Tripolis announced the extension of Riera's contract with the club for two more years, until June 2023.

On 30 May 2023, he signed a contract with Greek Super League team OFI until the summer of 2025.

== Career statistics ==
As of match played 7 April 2024

Club	Season	League			National cup		Continental		Other		Total	
Club	Season	Division	Apps	Goals	Apps	Goals	Apps	Goals	Apps	Goals	Apps	Goals
Levante B	2015–16	Segunda División B	7	0	—		—		—		7	0
La Roda (loan)	2015–16	Segunda División B	11	0	—		—		—		11	0
Formentera	2017–18	Segunda División B	21	3	6	0	—		—		27	3
Toledo	2017–18	Segunda División B	1	1	—		—		—		1	1
Villarreal B	2018–19	Segunda División B	15	0	—		—		—		15	0
Asteras Tripolis	2019–20	Superleague Greece	24	0	3	0	—		—		27	0
Asteras Tripolis	2020–21	Superleague Greece	31	4	2	0	—		—		33	4
Asteras Tripolis	2021–22	Superleague Greece	29	7	1	0	—		—		30	7
Asteras Tripolis	2022–23	Superleague Greece	23	1	1	0	—		—		24	1
Asteras Tripolis	Total		107	12	7	0	—		—		114	12
OFI Crete	2023–24	Superleague Greece	23	3	4	1	—		—		27	4
Career total			185	19	17	1	0	0	0	0	202	20
