= Alexandros Pagalis =

Greek footballer

Personal information
- Date of birth: 4 February 1988 (age 38)
- Place of birth: Stuttgart, Germany
- Height: 1.88 m (6 ft 2 in)
- Position: Centre back

Youth career
  - 2006: Panathinaikos

Senior career*
Years	Team	Apps	(Gls)
2006–2009	Panathinaikos		
2007–2008	→ Niki Volos (loan)		
2008	→ Fostiras (loan)		
2008–2009	→ AS Trenčín (loan)		
2009–2010	AEK Larnaca		
2010–2012	Ethnikos Assia		
2013–2014	A.O. Sinaradon		
2014–2015	Volida Kato Garouna		
2015–2017	Asteras Petriti		
- * Club domestic league appearances and goals

Alexandros Pagalis (Greek: Αλέξανδρος Πάγκαλης; born 4 February 1988 in Athens) is a former Greek footballer who played as a defender.

== Career ==
Pagalis who began his career in the youth academy of Panathinaikos and played there until June 2006. He had also played for Niki Volos, Fostiras and AS Trenčín. He also played for AEK Larnaca and Ethnikos Assia in Cyprus.
