= Kristo Shehu =

Greek footballer (born 2000)

Personal information
- Full name: Kristo Shehu
- Date of birth: 1 March 2000 (age 26)
- Place of birth: Eretria, Greece
- Height: 1.89 m (6 ft 2 in)
- Position: Forward

Youth career
- Athlitiki Akadimia Eretrias
- –2020: Panathinaikos
- 2019–2020: → Bologna (loan)

Senior career*
Years	Team	Apps	(Gls)
2018–2021	Panathinaikos	1	(0)
2021	→ Apollon Larissa (loan)	9	(2)
2021–2022	Panathinaikos B	8	(1)

International career
2016	Albania U17	2	(0)
2019	Greece U19	3	(0)
- * Club domestic league appearances and goals as of 18 December 2021

Kristo Shehu (born 1 March 2000) is a Greek professional footballer who plays as a centre-forward.
