= Spyros Tzavidas =

Greek association football player

Personal information
- Full name: Spyridon Tzavidas
- Date of birth: 21 August 2001 (age 25)
- Place of birth: Lagonisi, Greece
- Height: 1.82 m (6 ft 0 in)
- Position: Winger

Youth career
- 2013–2020: Panathinaikos

Senior career*
Years	Team	Apps	(Gls)
2020–2022	Panathinaikos	3	(0)

International career
2017–2018	Greece U17	4	(0)
2019	Greece U19	2	(0)
- * Club domestic league appearances and goals

Spyros Tzavidas (Greek: Σπύρος Τζαβίδας; born 21 August 2001) is a Greek former professional footballer who played as a winger.

== Career ==
Tzavidas made four appearances for Panathinaikos. He announced his retirement from playing in January 2022 citing an unspecified "health problem".

Later on it was revealed the reason for his retirement were heart related issues, similar to the ones his brother Marios had and also made him retire from professional football.

== Personal life ==
Tzavidas' brother, Marios, was also a professional football player.
