= Leandro Frroku =

Albanian footballer

Personal information
- Date of birth: 3 September 2003 (age 23)
- Place of birth: Athens, Greece
- Height: 1.79 m (5 ft 10 in)
- Position: Defensive midfielder

Team information
- Current team: Asteras Tripolis B
- Number: 23

Youth career
- 2013–2022: Panathinaikos

Senior career*
Years	Team	Apps	(Gls)
2021–2024	Panathinaikos B	17	(1)
2022–2025	Panathinaikos	1	(0)
2025–	Asteras Tripolis B	23	(2)

International career^{‡}
2021	Albania U19	2	(0)
2022–2024	Albania U21	4	(0)
- * Club domestic league appearances and goals as of 22 February 2026 ‡ National team caps and goals as of 15 October 2024

Leandro Frroku (born 3 September 2003) is an Albanian professional footballer who plays as a defensive midfielder for Super League Greece 2 club Asteras Tripolis B. Born in Greece, he represents Albania at youth level.

== Career ==
=== Panathinaikos ===
Frroku plays mainly as a midfielder and joined Panathinaikos from the team's youth ranks.

On 17 February 2023, Frroku signed an extension with Panathinaikos until the summer of 2027.

== Career statistics ==
As of 26 June 2023

Club	Season	League			Cup		Continental		Other		Total	
Club	Season	Division	Apps	Goals	Apps	Goals	Apps	Goals	Apps	Goals	Apps	Goals
Panathinaikos B	2021–22	Superleague 2	4	1	0	0	—		—		4	1
Panathinaikos	2022–23	Superleague Greece	1	0	0	0	0	0	—		1	0
Panathinaikos	2023–24	Superleague Greece	0	0	0	0	0	0	—		0	0
Panathinaikos	Total		1	0	0	0	0	0	0	0	1	0
Career total			5	1	0	0	0	0	0	0	5	1
