= 2024–25 Panathinaikos F.C. season =

Panathinaikos
2024–25 season
- Chairman: Giannis Alafouzos
- Manager: Diego Alonso (until 29 October 2024); Rui Vitória
- Stadium: Athens Olympic Stadium
- Super League: 2nd
- Greek Cup: Quarter-finals
- UEFA Europa League: Third qualifying round
- UEFA Conference League: Round of 16
- Top goalscorer: League: Filip Đuričić (7 goals); All: Tetê; Filip Đuričić; Fotis Ioannidis (11 each)
- Highest home attendance: 59,742 (vs Chelsea) (24 October 2024)
- Lowest home attendance: 5,554 (vs Panetolikos) (1 March 2025)
- Average home league attendance: 16,186
- Biggest win: 4–0 (vs Botev Plovdiv (A); 1 August 2024; UEFA Europa League), (vs Dinamo Minsk (H); 19 December 2024; UEFA Conference League)
- Biggest defeat: 1–4 (vs Chelsea (H); 24 October 2024; UEFA Conference League)
Home colours	Away colours	Third colours

The 2024–25 season was the 117th season in the existence of Panathinaikos F.C. and the 66th competitive season in the top flight of Greek football. They competed in the Greek Super League, the Greek Cup, the UEFA Europa League, and the UEFA Conference League. They played all of their home games in Athens Olympic Stadium for every competition they participated in. The season began on 1 July 2024 and finished on 30 June 2025.

On 9 October, player George Baldock was found dead in the pool of his house in Glyfada, overshadowing the season.

== Coaching staff ==
As of 31 October 2024

Position	Staff
Head coach	(Portugal) Rui Vitória
Assistant coach	(Portugal) Sergio Botelho
Assistant coach	(Portugal) Arnaldo Teixeira
Fitness coach	(Portugal) José Da Paz Pereira
Assistant fitness coach	(Greece) Dimitris Kapralos
Goalkeeper coach	(Portugal) Luís Esteves
Assistant goalkeeper coach	(Greece) Giorgos Mountakis
Analyst	(Portugal) Walter Días
Analyst	(Greece) Iraklis Tsarouchis

== Players ==
=== Squad information ===
As of 11 February 2025

No.	Name	Nationality	Position (s)	Date of birth (age)	Signed from	Notes
Goalkeepers
1	Yuri Lodygin	(Russia) (Greece)	GK	26 May 1990 (age 36)	(Greece) PAS Giannina	
69	Bartłomiej Drągowski	(Poland)	GK	19 August 1997 (age 29)	(Italy) Spezia	
81	Klidman Lilo	(Albania) (Greece)	GK	31 January 2003 (age 23)	Youth system	
Defenders
2	Georgios Vagiannidis	(Greece)	RB / RM	12 September 2001 (age 25)	(Italy) Inter Milan	
3	Philipp Max	(Germany)	LB	30 September 1993 (age 33)	(Germany) Eintracht Frankfurt	
5	Bart Schenkeveld	(Netherlands)	CB	28 August 1991 (age 35)	(Australia) Melbourne City	
14	Erik Palmer-Brown	(United States)	CB	24 April 1997 (age 29)	(France) Troyes	
15	Sverrir Ingi Ingason	(Iceland)	CB	5 August 1993 (age 33)	(Denmark) Midtjylland	
21	Tin Jedvaj	(Croatia)	CB	28 November 1995 (age 30)	(Russia) Lokomotiv Moscow	
23	Hörður Magnússon	(Iceland)	CB	11 March 1993 (age 33)	(Russia) CSKA Moscow	
25	Filip Mladenović	(Serbia)	LB	15 August 1991 (age 35)	(Poland) Legia Warsaw	
27	Giannis Kotsiras	(Greece)	RB / RM	16 December 1992 (age 33)	(Greece) Asteras Tripolis	
Midfielders
4	Rubén Pérez	(Spain)	DM / MF	26 April 1989 (age 37)	(Spain) Leganés	
6	Zeca	(Greece) (Portugal)	MF	31 August 1988 (age 38)	(Denmark) Copenhagen	
8	Azzedine Ounahi	(Morocco)	MF	19 April 2000 (age 26)	(France) Marseille	loan
10	Tetê	(Brazil)	RW / LW	15 February 2000 (age 26)	(Turkey) Galatasaray	
11	Anastasios Bakasetas	(Greece)	AM	28 June 1993 (age 33)	(Turkey) Trabzonspor	
16	Adam Gnezda Čerin	(Slovenia)	MF	16 July 1999 (age 27)	(Germany) 1. FC Nürnberg	
17	Daniel Mancini	(Argentina) (Italy)	RW	11 November 1996 (age 29)	(Greece) Aris Thessaloniki	
18	Dimitrios Limnios	(Greece) (Brazil)	RW / LW	27 May 1998 (age 25)	(Germany) 1. FC Köln	
20	Nemanja Maksimović	(Serbia)	MF	26 January 1995 (age 29)	(Spain) Getafe	
24	Manolis Siopis	(Greece)	DM / MF	14 May 1994 (age 30)	(Wales) Cardiff City	
28	Facundo Pellistri	(Uruguay)	RW / LW	20 December 2001 (age 24)	(England) Manchester United	
31	Filip Đuričić	(Serbia)	AM	30 January 1992 (age 34)	(Italy) Sampdoria	
44	Georgios Nikas	(Greece)	MF	17 September 1999 (age 27)	(Greece) Levadiakos	
55	Willian Arão	(Brazil)	CB / MF	12 March 1992 (age 34)	(Turkey) Fenerbahçe	
Forwards
7	Fotis Ioannidis	(Greece)	CF	10 January 2000 (age 26)	(Greece) Levadiakos	
19	Karol Świderski	(Poland)	CF	23 January 1997 (age 28)	(United States) Charlotte FC	
29	Alexander Jeremejeff	(Sweden)	CF	12 October 1993 (age 33)	(Sweden) BK Häcken	

== Transfers ==
=== Summer window ===
==== In ====
Squad #	Position	Player	Transferred From	Fee	Date	Ref
44	MF	(Greece) Georgios Nikas	(Greece) Levadiakos	Loan return	30 June 2024	
21	DF	(Croatia) Tin Jedvaj	(Russia) Lokomotiv Moscow	€500,000	1 July 2024	
69	GK	(Poland) Bartłomiej Drągowski	(Italy) Spezia	€1,500,000	1 July 2024	
20	MF	(Serbia) Nemanja Maksimović	(Spain) Getafe	Free	1 July 2024	
32	DF	(Greece) (England) George Baldock	(England) Sheffield United	Free	1 July 2024	
15	DF	(Iceland) Sverrir Ingi Ingason	(Denmark) Midtjylland	€3,080,000	15 July 2024	
10	MF	(Brazil) Tetê	(Turkey) Galatasaray	€7,250,000	25 July 2024	
3	DF	(Germany) Philipp Max	(Germany) Eintracht Frankfurt	€1,000,000	5 August 2024	
28	MF	(Uruguay) Facundo Pellistri	(England) Manchester United	€6,000,000	21 August 2024	
8	MF	(Morocco) Azzedine Ounahi	(France) Marseille	Loan	4 September 2024	

==== Out ====
Squad #	Position	Player	Transferred To	Fee	Date	Ref
20	DF	(Brazil) Vitor Hugo	(Brazil) Bahia	End of loan	30 June 2024	
21	DF	(Croatia) Tin Jedvaj	(Russia) Lokomotiv Moscow	End of loan	30 June 2024	
69	GK	(Poland) Bartłomiej Drągowski	(Italy) Spezia	End of loan	30 June 2024	
94	DF	(Turkey) Samet Akaydin	(Turkey) Fenerbahçe	End of loan	30 June 2024	
3	DF	(Spain) Juankar	(Greece) Aris	End of contract	30 June 2024	
10	MF	(Brazil) Bernard	(Brazil) Atlético Mineiro	End of contract	30 June 2024	
34	MF	(Argentina) Sebastián Palacios	(Argentina) Talleres	End of contract	30 June 2024	
91	GK	(Italy) Alberto Brignoli	(Greece) AEK Athens	End of contract	30 June 2024	
15	GK	(Greece) Vasilios Xenopoulos	(Greece) A.E. Kifisia	Free	1 July 2024	
	MF	(Brazil) Jonas Toró	(Brazil) Botafogo-SP	Free	18 July 2024	
22	MF	(Spain) Aitor Cantalapiedra	(Cyprus) AEK Larnaca	Undisclosed	18 August 2024	
23	MF	(Albania) Enis Çokaj	(Greece) Levadiakos	Loan	30 August 2024	
36	DF	(Greece) Giorgos Katris	(Greece) Levadiakos	Loan	30 August 2024	
60	MF	(Greece) Georgios Kyriopoulos	(Greece) A.E. Kifisia	Loan	4 September 2024	
64	MF	(Greece) Christos Kryparakos	(Greece) Niki Volos	Loan	6 September 2024	
67	DF	(Greece) Athanasios Prodromitis	(Greece) Niki Volos	Loan	6 September 2024	
70	MF	(Portugal) Miguel Tavares	(Greece) Makedonikos	Loan	11 September 2024	
77	MF	(Slovenia) Benjamin Verbič	Free agent	Free	19 December 2024	

=== Winter window ===
==== In ====
Squad #	Position	Player	Transferred From	Fee	Date	Ref
19	CF	(Poland) Karol Świderski	(United States) Charlotte FC	€1,900,000	23 January 2025	
24	MF	(Greece) Manolis Siopis	(Wales) Cardiff City	€800,000	31 January 2025	

==== Out ====
Squad #	Position	Player	Transferred To	Fee	Date	Ref
	MF	(Hungary) László Kleinheisler	Free Agent	Free	31 January 2025	
	MF	(France) Alexis Trouillet	Free Agent	Free	2 February 2025	
52	MF	(Netherlands) Tonny Vilhena	(Turkey) Alanyaspor	Loan	7 February 2025	
9	CF	(Slovenia) Andraž Šporar	(Turkey) Alanyaspor	€750,000	11 February 2025	

== Pre-season and friendlies ==
29 June 2024 Friendly	SVU Haus im Ennstal	0–14	Panathinaikos	Haus im Ennstal, Austria
19:00		Report	Đuričić 1', 13', 28'; Nikas 12', 52'; Mancini 35'; Dabizas 40'; Jeremejeff 64', 85', 87'; Bregu 78'; Vagiannidis 80'; Aitor 81'; Schenkeveld 85'	Stadium: Hauser EnnsbodenArena; Referee: Martin Lodl

3 July 2024 Friendly	Pafos	0–0	Panathinaikos	Haus im Ennstal, Austria
17:30		Report		Stadium: Hauser EnnsbodenArena

6 July 2024 Friendly	Panathinaikos	0–1	Eintracht Braunschweig	Grödig, Austria
18:00		Report	Ba 62'	Stadium: Untersberg-Arena

13 July 2024 Friendly	Panathinaikos	3–1	AEK Larnaca	Athens, Greece
21:00	Bakasetas 9', 50'; Vagiannidis 86'	Report	Mladenović 85' (o.g.)	Stadium: Leoforos Alexandras Stadium; Referee: Angelos Evangelou

18 July 2024 Friendly	Panathinaikos	1–0	Maccabi Netanya	Athens, Greece
21:00	Mancini 30'	Report		Stadium: Leoforos Alexandras Stadium; Referee: Anastasios Papapetrou

== Competitions ==
=== Overall record ===
Competition	First match	Last match	Starting round	Final position	Record							
Competition	First match	Last match	Starting round	Final position	Pld	W	D	L	GF	GA	GD	Win %
Super League 1	17 August 2024	18 May 2025	Matchday 1	2nd	32	17	8	7	42	32	+10	53.13
Betsson Greek Cup	4 December 2024	5 February 2025	Round of 16	Quarter-finals	4	2	1	1	5	4	+1	50.00
UEFA Europa League	25 July 2024	15 August 2024	Second qualifying round	Third qualifying round	4	3	0	1	7	2	+5	75.00
UEFA Conference League	22 August 2024	TBD	Play-off round	Round of 16	12	6	1	5	20	16	+4	50.00
Total					52	28	10	14	74	54	+20	53.85

Last updated: 4 May 2025
Source: Competitions

=== Super League Greece ===
==== Regular season ====
18 August 2024 1	Panathinaikos	0–1	Asteras Tripolis	Athens, Greece
20:00		Report	52' Xesc Regis	Stadium: Athens Olympic Stadium; Attendance: Behind closed doors Referee: Anastasios Sidiropoulos

25 August 2024 2	Panathinaikos	1–0	Levadiakos	Athens, Greece
21:00	Šporar 90+6'	Report		Stadium: Athens Olympic Stadium; Attendance: 6,345; Referee: Konstantinos Tsetsilas

1 September 2024 3	Athens Kallithea	2–2	Panathinaikos	Athens, Greece
22:00	Moutinho 28'; Valbuena 80'	Report	32' Filip Đuričić; 90+2' Tetê	Stadium: Leoforos Alexandras Stadium; Attendance: 6,064; Referee: Alexandros Katsikogiannis

15 September 2024 4	PAOK	0–0	Panathinaikos	Thessaloniki, Greece
20:30		Report		Stadium: Toumba Stadium; Attendance: 18,511; Referee: Slavko Vinčić

22 September 2024 5	Panathinaikos	3–1	Panserraikos	Athens, Greece
18:00	Tetê 10'; Djuricic 81', 88'	Report	15' Betancor	Stadium: Athens Olympic Stadium; Attendance: Behind Closed Doors; Referee: Angelos Evaggelou

29 September 2024 6	AEK Athens	2–0	Panathinaikos	Athens, Greece
21:00	Pierrot 30'; Amrabat 90+3'	Report		Stadium: OPAP Arena; Attendance: 30,082; Referee: Sascha Stegemann

6 October 2024 7	Panathinaikos	0–0	Olympiacos	Athens, Greece
20:30		Report		Stadium: Athens Olympic Stadium; Attendance: 56,087; Referee: Daniel Siebert

20 October 2024 8	OFI	0–1	Panathinaikos	Heraklion, Greece
18:00		Report	6' Tetê	Stadium: Theodoros Vardinogiannis Stadium; Attendance: 5,200; Referee: Athanasios Tzilos

27 October 2024 9	Panathinaikos	1–1	Aris	Athens, Greece
18:00	Tetê 33'	Report	72' Moron	Stadium: Athens Olympic Stadium; Attendance: 18,702; Referee: Felix Zwayer

3 November 2024 10	Volos	0–1	Panathinaikos	Volos, Greece
17:00		Report	14' Djuricic	Stadium: Panthessaliko Stadium; Attendance: 4,213; Referee: Aggelos Evangelou

10 November 2024 11	Panathinaikos	1–0	Lamia	Athens, Greece
19:30	Bakasetas 73'	Report		Stadium: Athens Olympic Stadium; Attendance: 11,068; Referee: Alexandros Tsakalidis

24 November 2024 12	Panetolikos	1–2	Panathinaikos	Agrinio, Greece
17:00	Bouzoukis 52'	Report	10' Djuricic; 90+2' Arao	Stadium: Panetolikos Stadium; Attendance: 3,028; Referee: Christos Vergetis

1 December 2024 13	Panathinaikos	1–1	Atromitos	Athens, Greece
20:30	Maksimovic 16'	Report	90' Karamanis	Stadium: Athens Olympic Stadium; Attendance: 14,171; Referee: Alexandros Katsikogiannis

8 December 2024 14	Asteras Tripolis	0–1	Panathinaikos	Tripoli, Greece
19:00		Report	90+4' Jeremejeff	Stadium: Theodoros Kolokotronis Stadium; Attendance: 2,779; Referee: Fotios Polychronis

15 December 2024 15	Levadiakos	0–1	Panathinaikos	Livadeia, Greece
18:00		Report	60' Ioannidis	Stadium: Levadia Municipal Stadium; Attendance: 2,760; Referee: Anastasios Papapetrou

22 December 2024 16	Panathinaikos	1–0	Athens Kallithea	Athens, Greece
18:00	Jeremejeff 82'	Report		Stadium: Athens Olympic Stadium; Attendance: 11,844; Referee: Aggelos Evangelou

5 January 2025 17	Panathinaikos	2–1	PAOK	Athens, Greece
20:30	Ioannidis 12'; Ounahi 90'	Report	2' Živković	Stadium: Athens Olympic Stadium; Attendance: Behind closed doors Referee: Morten Krogh

12 January 2025 18	Panserraikos	2–2	Panathinaikos	Serres, Greece
16:30	Betancor 64', 76' (pen.)	Report	38' Tetê; 48' Čerin	Stadium: Serres Municipal Stadium; Referee: Petros Tsagarakis

19 January 2025 19	Panathinaikos	1–0	AEK Athens	Athens, Greece
20:30	Ioannidis 38' (pen.)	Report		Stadium: Athens Olympic Stadium; Attendance: 22,937; Referee: Espen Eskås

26 January 2025 20	Olympiacos	1–1	Panathinaikos	Piraeus, Greece
20:30	Carmo 14'	Report	74' (pen.) Ioannidis	Stadium: Karaiskakis Stadium; Attendance: 32,646; Referee: Slavko Vinčić

1 February 2025 21	Panathinaikos	3–2	OFI	Athens, Greece
18:00	Pellistri 57'; Ioannidis 72'; Vagiannidis 81'	Report	27' Theodosoulakis; 42' Fountas	Stadium: Athens Olympic Stadium; Attendance: 16,308; Referee: Vasileios Fotias

9 February 2025 22	Aris	2–0	Panathinaikos	Thessaloniki, Greece
19:30	43' Saverio; 50' Moron	Report		Stadium: Kleanthis Vikelidis Stadium; Attendance: 8,740; Referee: Harm Osmers

16 February 2025 23	Panathinaikos	2–1	Volos	Athens, Greece
17:00	Ingason 20'; Čerin 55'	Report	59' Juanpi	Stadium: Athens Olympic Stadium; Attendance: 6,733; Referee: Alexandros Tsakalidis

23 February 2025 24	Lamia	3–1	Panathinaikos	Lamia, Greece
17:00	Tshibola 6'; Furtado 78', 90+2'	Report	72' Djuricic	Stadium: Lamia Municipal Stadium; Attendance: 1,117

1 March 2025 25	Panathinaikos	2–0	Panetolikos	Athens, Greece
20:00	Świderski 34'; Ounahi 79'	Report		Stadium: Athens Olympic Stadium; Attendance: 5,554; Referee: Christos Vergetis

9 March 2025 26	Atromitos	1–1	Panathinaikos	Athens, Greece
19:00	Jubitana 77'	Report	90' Maksimović	Stadium: Peristeri Stadium; Referee: Vasileios Fotias

===== League table =====
Pos	Team	Pld	W	D	L	GF	GA	GD	Pts	Qualification or relegation
1	Olympiacos	26	18	6	2	45	16	+29	60	Qualification for the Championship play-offs
2	AEK Athens	26	16	5	5	44	16	+28	53	Qualification for the Championship play-offs
3	Panathinaikos	26	14	8	4	31	22	+9	50	Qualification for the Championship play-offs
4	PAOK	26	14	4	8	51	26	+25	46	Qualification for the Championship play-offs
5	Aris	26	12	6	8	31	28	+3	42	Qualification for the Europe play-offs

Source: Super League Greece
Rules for classification: 1) Points; 2) Head-to-head points; 3) Head-to-head goal difference; 4) Goal difference; 5) Goals scored; 6) Play-offs (neutral ground).
(Note: Criterion 6 is only used if needed to decide champion, teams for relegation or teams for UEFA competitions).

==== Championship play-offs ====
30 March 2025 1	Olympiacos	4–2	Panathinaikos	Piraeus, Greece
21:00	Yaremchuk 1', 51'; Chiquinho 16'; Kostoulas 82'	Report	25' Mladenović; 75' (pen.) Ioannidis	Stadium: Karaiskakis Stadium; Attendance: 32,500; Referee: Rade Obrenovic

6 April 2025 2	Panathinaikos	3–1	AEK Athens	Athens, Greece
21:30	Maksimović 17'; Đuričić 80'; Jeremejeff 88'	Report	47' Moukoudi	Stadium: Athens Olympic Stadium; Attendance: 10,272; Referee: Damian Sylwestrzak

13 April 2025 3	Panathinaikos	3–1	PAOK	Athens, Greece
19:00	Ounahi 33'; Wieteska , 42' (o.g.); Świderski 50'	Report	78' Konstantelias	Stadium: Athens Olympic Stadium; Attendance: 14,350; Referee: Felix Zwayer

27 April 2025 4	PAOK	2–1	Panathinaikos	Thessaloniki, Greece
20:00	Michailidis 35'; Camara 59'	Report	3' Jedvaj	Stadium: Toumba Stadium; Attendance: 18,275; Referee: Harm Osmers

4 May 2025 5	AEK Athens	1–2	Panathinaikos	Athens, Greece
20:00	Lamela 44'	Report	51' Ounahi; 61' (pen.) Świderski	Stadium: OPAP Arena; Attendance: 22,172; Referee: Enea Jorgji

11 May 2025 6	Panathinaikos	0–1	Olympiacos	Athens, Greece
20:00	60' (pen.) El Kabbi	Report		Stadium: Athens Olympic Stadium; Attendance: 16,052; Referee: Andris Treimanis

===== Championship play-offs table =====
Pos	Team	Pld	W	D	L	GF	GA	GD	Pts	Qualification
1	Olympiacos (C)	32	23	6	3	58	22	+36	75	Qualification for the Champions League league phase (Note: Olympiacos originally qualified for the 2025–26 UEFA Champions League second qualifying round, but since the 2024–25 UEFA Champions League winner (Paris Saint-Germain) already qualified via their domestic league, Olympiacos was promoted to the Champions League league phase as the league champion with the highest club coefficient in the Champions League Champions Path qualifying rounds.)
2	Panathinaikos	32	17	8	7	42	32	+10	59	Qualification for the Champions League second qualifying round
3	PAOK	32	18	4	10	62	37	+25	58	Qualification for the Europa League third qualifying round (Note: Since the 2024–25 Greek Cup winner (Olympiacos) qualified for the Champions League, the Europa League third qualifying round place was passed to the third-placed team.)
4	AEK Athens	32	16	5	11	48	28	+20	53	Qualification for the Conference League second qualifying round

Source: Super League Greece
Rules for classification: 1) Points; 2) Head-to-head points (Regular season and play-off); 3) Head-to-head goal difference (Regular season and play-off); 4) Regular season position.
(C) Champions

===== Results summary =====
Overall								Home						Away					
Pld	W	D	L	GF	GA	GD	Pts	W	D	L	GF	GA	GD	W	D	L	GF	GA	GD
32	17	8	7	42	32	+10	59	11	3	2	24	11	+13	6	5	5	18	21	−3

Last updated: 11 May 2025.

=== Greek Football Cup ===
Panathinaikos will enter the Greek Football Cup at the round of 16.

==== Round of 16 ====
4 December 2024 First leg	Atromitos	1–2	Panathinaikos	Peristeri
21:30	8' van Weert	Report	Cerin 45+3'; Ounahi 54'	Stadium: Peristeri Stadium; Referee: Stavros Tsimenteridis

8 January 2025 Second leg	Panathinaikos	2–1 (4–2 agg.)	Atromitos	Marousi
20:30	4' Pellistri; 32' Bakasetas	Report	Athanasiou 50'	Stadium: Olympic Stadium; Attendance: Behind closed doors Referee: Anastasios Papapetrou

==== Quarter-finals ====
15 January 2025 First leg	Panathinaikos	1–1	Olympiacos	Marousi
19:30	51' Đuričić	Report	Yaremchuk 75'	Stadium: Olympic Stadium; Referee: Szymon Marciniak

5 February 2025 Second leg	Olympiacos	1–0 (2–1 agg.)	Panathinaikos	Piraeus
19:30	90+4' Mouzakitis	Report		Stadium: Karaiskakis Stadium; Referee: Juan Martínez Munuera

=== UEFA Europa League ===
==== Second qualifying round ====
The draw for the second qualifying round was held on 19 June 2024

25 July 2024 First leg	Panathinaikos (Greece)	2–1	(Bulgaria) Botev Plovdiv	Athens, Greece
21:00	Jeremejeff 8'; Bakasetas 44' (pen.)	Report	71' Korošec	Stadium: Athens Olympic Stadium; Attendance: 11,236; Referee: David Fuxman (Israel)

1 August 2024 Second leg	Botev Plovdiv (Bulgaria)	0–4 (1–6 agg.)	(Greece) Panathinaikos	Plovdiv, Bulgaria
21:00		Report	6', 50' Jeremejeff; 34', 45+2' Djuricic	Stadium: Stadion Hristo Botev; Attendance: 17,076; Referee: Daniel Schlager (Germany)

==== Third qualifying round ====
The draw for the third qualifying round was held on 22 July 2024.

8 August 2024 First leg	Panathinaikos (Greece)	0–1	(Netherlands) Ajax	Athens, Greece
21:00		Report	Berghuis 28'	Stadium: Athens Olympic Stadium; Attendance: 24,452; Referee: Filip Glova (Slovakia)

15 August 2024 Second leg	Ajax (Netherlands)	0–1 (a.e.t.) (1–1 agg.) (13–12 p)	(Greece) Panathinaikos	Amsterdam, Netherlands
21:15		Report	Tetê 89'	Stadium: Johan Cruyff Arena; Attendance: 54,089; Referee: Chris Kavanagh (England)
	Penalties
	Bergwijn (penalty scored); Van den Boomen (penalty scored); Godts (penalty scored); Taylor (penalty scored); Brobbey (penalty missed); Henderson (penalty scored); Traoré (penalty missed); Baas (penalty missed); Gaaei (penalty scored); Šutalo (penalty scored); Pasveer (penalty scored); Bergwijn (penalty scored); Van den Boomen (penalty scored); Godts (penalty scored); Taylor (penalty scored); Brobbey (penalty missed); Gaaei (penalty scored)		(penalty missed) Mancini; (penalty scored) Jeremejeff; (penalty scored) Tetê; (penalty scored) Jedvaj; (penalty scored) Mladenović; (penalty scored) Vilhena; (penalty missed) Maksimović; (penalty missed) Ingason; (penalty scored) Vagiannidis; (penalty scored) Zeca; (penalty scored) Drągowski; (penalty scored) Mancini; (penalty scored) Jeremejeff; (penalty scored) Tetê; (penalty scored) Jedvaj; (penalty missed) Mladenović; (penalty missed) Vilhena

=== UEFA Conference League ===
==== Play-off round ====
The draw for the play-off round was held on 5 August 2024.

22 August 2024 First leg	Lens (France)	2–1	(Greece) Panathinaikos	Lens, France
22:00	Frankowski 4'; Said 34'	Report	53' Ioannidis	Stadium: Stade Bollaert-Delelis; Attendance: 37,232; Referee: Gergő Bogár (Hungary)

29 August 2024 Second leg	Panathinaikos (Greece)	2–0 (3–2 agg.)	(France) Lens	Athens, Greece
21:00	Pellistri 62'; Tetê 85'	Report		Stadium: Athens Olympic Stadium; Attendance: 58,500; Referee: Juan Martínez Munuera (Spain)

==== League phase ====
The draw for the League phase was held on 30 August 2024.

Pos	Team	Pld	W	D	L	GF	GA	GD	Pts	Qualification
11	(Cyprus Football Association) APOEL	6	3	2	1	8	5	+3	11	Advance to knockout phase play-offs (seeded)
12	(Cyprus Football Association) Pafos	6	3	1	2	11	7	+4	10	Advance to knockout phase play-offs (seeded)
13	(Hellenic Football Federation) Panathinaikos	6	3	1	2	10	7	+3	10	Advance to knockout phase play-offs (seeded)
14	(Football Association of Slovenia) Olimpija Ljubljana	6	3	1	2	7	6	+1	10	Advance to knockout phase play-offs (seeded)
15	(Royal Spanish Football Federation) Real Betis	6	3	1	2	6	5	+1	10	Advance to knockout phase play-offs (seeded)

Source: UEFA
Rules for classification: League phase tiebreakers

Round	1	2	3	4	5	6
Ground	A	H	A	H	A	H
Result	D	L	L	W	W	W
Position	18	29	31	24	18	13
Points	1	1	1	4	7	10

Source: UEFA
A = Away; H = Home; W = Win; D = Draw; L = Loss

3 October 2024 1	Borac Banja Luka (Bosnia and Herzegovina)	1–1	(Greece) Panathinaikos	Banja Luka, Bosnia and Herzegovina
22:00	Despotović 50'	Report	11' Bakasetas	Stadium: Banja Luka City Stadium; Attendance: 4,208; Referee: Elchin Masiyev (Azerbaijan)

24 October 2024 2	Panathinaikos (Greece)	1–4	(England) Chelsea	Athens, Greece
19:45	Pellistri 69'	Report	Félix 22', 55'; Mudryk 48'; Nkunku 59' (pen.)	Stadium: Athens Olympic Stadium; Attendance: 59,742; Referee: António Nobre (Portugal)

7 November 2024 3	Djurgården (Sweden)	2–1	(Greece) Panathinaikos	Stockholm, Sweden
22:00	Gulliksen 49'; Hümmet 72'	Report	Đuričić 17'	Stadium: Tele2 Arena; Attendance: 17,376; Referee: Igor Pajač (Croatia)

28 November 2024 4	Panathinaikos (Greece)	1–0	(Finland) HJK	Athens, Greece
19:45	Toivio 33' (o.g.)	Report		Stadium: Athens Olympic Stadium; Attendance: 18,822; Referee: Donatas Rumsas (Lithuania)

12 December 2024 5	The New Saints (Wales)	0–2	(Greece) Panathinaikos	Shrewsbury, England
22:00		Report	Đuričić 15'; Ioannidis 61' (pen.)	Stadium: New Meadow; Attendance: 5,716; Referee: Oliver Reitala (Finland)

19 December 2024 6	Panathinaikos (Greece)	4–0	(Belarus) Dinamo Minsk	Athens, Greece
22:00	Jeremejeff 33'; Tetê 54', 65'; Ioannidis 84'	Report		Stadium: Athens Olympic Stadium; Attendance: 19,866; Referee: Robert Hennessy (Republic of Ireland)

==== Knockout phase play-offs ====
The draw for the Knockout phase play-offs was held on 20 December 2024.

13 February 2025 First leg	Víkingur Reykjavik (Iceland)	2–1	(Greece) Panathinaikos	Helsinki, Finland
19:45	13' Atlason; 56' Vilhjálmsson	Report	Ioannidis 90+1' (pen.)	Stadium: Helsinki Football Stadium; Attendance: 811; Referee: Rohit Saggi(Norway)

20 February 2025 Second leg	Panathinaikos (Greece)	2–0 (3–2 agg.)	(Iceland) Víkingur Reykjavik	Athens, Greece
22:00	70' Mladenović; 90+4' Tetê	Report		Stadium: Athens Olympic Stadium; Attendance: 8,931; Referee: Rade Obrenovič (Slovenia)

==== Round of 16 ====
The draw for the Knockout phase round of 16 was held on 21 February 2025.

6 March 2025 First leg	Panathinaikos (Greece)	3–2	(Italy) Fiorentina	Athens, Greece
19:45	Swiderski 5' Maksimovic 19' Tetê 55'	Report	20' Beltrán; 23' Fagioli	Stadium: Athens Olympic Stadium; Attendance: 26,849; Referee: Eric Lambrechts (Belgium)

13 March 2025 Second leg	Fiorentina (Italy)	3–1 (5–4 agg.)	(Greece) Panathinaikos	Florence, Italy
22:00	Mandragora 12' Guðmundsson 24' Kean 75'	Report	81' (pen.) Ioannidis	Stadium: Stadio Artemio Franchi; Attendance: 15,101; Referee: John Beaton (Scotland)
