= Giannis Kotsiras =

Greek footballer

Personal information
- Full name: Ioannis Kotsiras
- Date of birth: 16 December 1992 (age 33)
- Place of birth: Megalopoli, Greece
- Height: 1.83 m (6 ft 0 in)
- Position: Full-back

Team information
- Current team: Asteras Tripolis
- Number: 27

Senior career*
Years	Team	Apps	(Gls)
2008–2011	Doxa Megalopolis	42	(15)
2011–2014	AO Falesias	69	(38)
2014–2016	Panarkadikos	49	(22)
2016–2021	Asteras Tripolis	114	(2)
2021–2026	Panathinaikos	101	(0)
2026–	Asteras Tripolis	5	(0)

International career^{‡}
2019–2024	Greece	3	(0)
- * Club domestic league appearances and goals as of 20 September 2026 ‡ National team caps and goals as of 11 June 2024

Giannis Kotsiras (Greek: Γιάννης Κώτσιρας; born 16 December 1992) is a Greek professional footballer who plays as a full-back for Super League club Asteras Tripolis. He started his career as a right winger.

== Club career ==
=== Panarkadikos ===
Kotsiras began his senior footballing career began in Greece's local divisions when he signed for Doxa Megalopolis. He moved to AO Falesias in 2011, before making the switch in the summer of 2014, as he signed for Gamma Ethniki club Panarkadikos at the age of 21 playing 49 games as a winger and scoring 22 goals.

=== Asteras Tripolis ===
In 2016, Kotsiras signed for the Super League side Asteras Tripolis.

=== Panathinaikos ===
On 17 June 2021, he signed a three years' contract with Panathinaikos, for a transfer fee of €250,000.He was released from Panathinaikos on 12th of June 2026 after playing 156 matches with the club's shirt.

== International career ==
Kotsiras made his international debut for Greece on 30 May 2019 in a friendly match against Turkey, which finished as a 2–1 loss. He made his second appearance in a 3–2 home defeat against Armenia replacing an injured player in the first half and playing 73 minutes.

== Career statistics ==
=== Club ===
As of match played 22 March 2026

Appearances and goals by club, season and competition
Club	Season	League			Greek Cup		Europe		Total	
Club	Season	Division	Apps	Goals	Apps	Goals	Apps	Goals	Apps	Goals
Asteras Tripolis	2016–17	Super League Greece	9	0	5	1	–		14	1
Asteras Tripolis	2017–18	Super League Greece	18	1	2	0	–		20	1
Asteras Tripolis	2018–19	Super League Greece	26	0	8	0	2 (Note: Appearances in UEFA Europa League)	0	36	0
Asteras Tripolis	2019–20	Super League Greece	30	0	3	0	–		33	0
Asteras Tripolis	2020–21	Super League Greece	31	1	1	0	–		32	1
Asteras Tripolis	Total		114	2	18	0	2	0	135	3
Panathinaikos	2021–22	Super League Greece	26	0	7	0	–		33	0
Panathinaikos	2022–23	Super League Greece	25	0	3	0	2 (Note: Appearances in UEFA Europa Conference League)	0	30	0
Panathinaikos	2023–24	Super League Greece	31	0	7	0	5 (Note: Two appearances in UEFA Champions League, three appearances in UEFA Europa League)	0	43	0
Panathinaikos	2024–25	Super League Greece	8	0	3	0	12 (Note: Two appearances in UEFA Europa League, ten appearances in UEFA Europa Conference League)	0	23	0
Panathinaikos	2025–26	Super League Greece	11	0	4	0	12 (Note: Two appearances in UEFA Champions League, seven appearances in UEFA Europa League)	0	27	0
Panathinaikos	Total		101	0	24	0	28	0	156	0
Career total			216	2	42	1	33	0	291	3

=== International ===
As of 11 June 2019

Greece
Year	Apps	Goals
2019	2	0
Total	2	0

== Honours ==
Panathinaikos

- Greek Cup: 2021–22, 2023–24

Individual

- Super League Greece Team of the Season: 2020–21
