= Tin Jedvaj =

Croatian footballer (born 1995)

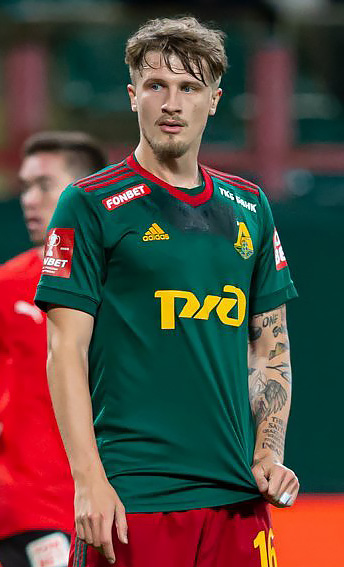
- Jedvaj with Lokomotiv Moscow in 2022

Personal information
- Full name: Tin Jedvaj
- Date of birth: 28 November 1995 (age 30)
- Place of birth: Zagreb, Croatia
- Height: 1.85 m (6 ft 1 in)
- Positions: Centre-back; right-back

Team information
- Current team: Al Shabab
- Number: 4

Youth career
- 2002–2005: NK Zagreb
- 2005–2013: Dinamo Zagreb

Senior career*
Years	Team	Apps	(Gls)
2013	Dinamo Zagreb	13	(1)
2013–2015	Roma	2	(0)
2014–2015	→ Bayer Leverkusen (loan)	13	(2)
2015–2021	Bayer Leverkusen	72	(1)
2019–2020	→ FC Augsburg (loan)	31	(2)
2021–2024	Lokomotiv Moscow	34	(2)
2023	→ Al Ain (loan)	11	(1)
2023–2024	→ Panathinaikos (loan)	24	(2)
2024–2026	Panathinaikos	38	(5)
2026–	Al Shabab	11	(0)

International career
2010	Croatia U15	4	(0)
2011	Croatia U16	4	(0)
2011	Croatia U17	8	(0)
2012	Croatia U18	6	(0)
2012–2013	Croatia U19	7	(2)
2013–2016	Croatia U21	5	(1)
2014–2020	Croatia	26	(2)
Medal record
Men's football
Representing Croatia
FIFA World Cup
Runner-up	2018 Russia
- * Club domestic league appearances and goals as of 30 October 2026

Tin Jedvaj (Croatian pronunciation: [tîːn jêdʋaːj]; born 28 November 1995) is a Croatian professional footballer who plays as a defender for Saudi Pro League club Al Shabab. Usually deployed as a centre-back, he can also play as a right-back.

A former youth international across various levels, Jedvaj made his senior debut for Croatia in September 2014. He was a part of the Croatia squad which ended runners-up to France in the 2018 FIFA World Cup final and won 26 caps for his country during his career as a senior international.

== Club career ==
=== Dinamo Zagreb ===
Jedvaj started his professional career in 2013 with Dinamo Zagreb, coming through Dinamo's youth academy. He made his debut in a match against Osijek, playing in central defence alongside Josip Šimunić. He scored his debut goal against Cibalia.

During his first professional season with the club, he won the Croatian Prva HNL trophy. At the beginning of the new season, he won another trophy with the club when Dinamo defeated Hajduk Split in the Croatian Supercup. During his time with Dinamo, Jedvaj made total of 14 official appearances for the club.

=== Roma ===
At the end of his first professional season, Jedvaj was targeted and approached by Italian club Roma, although the initial offer was rejected by the Dinamo board. On 10 July 2013, however, it was confirmed that Jedvaj had signed a contract with the Roman club. Jedvaj made his Roma debut on 1 December 2013, coming on as an 83rd-minute substitute in a 4–0 Serie A victory over Genoa. He made his starting debut for the club against the same opposition in the last round of the Serie A season, with Genoa winning the clash 1–0 at the Stadio Luigi Ferraris. Those were Jedvaj's only two appearances for the season, appearing on the bench 33 times for Roma in the 2013–14 season.

=== Bayer Leverkusen ===
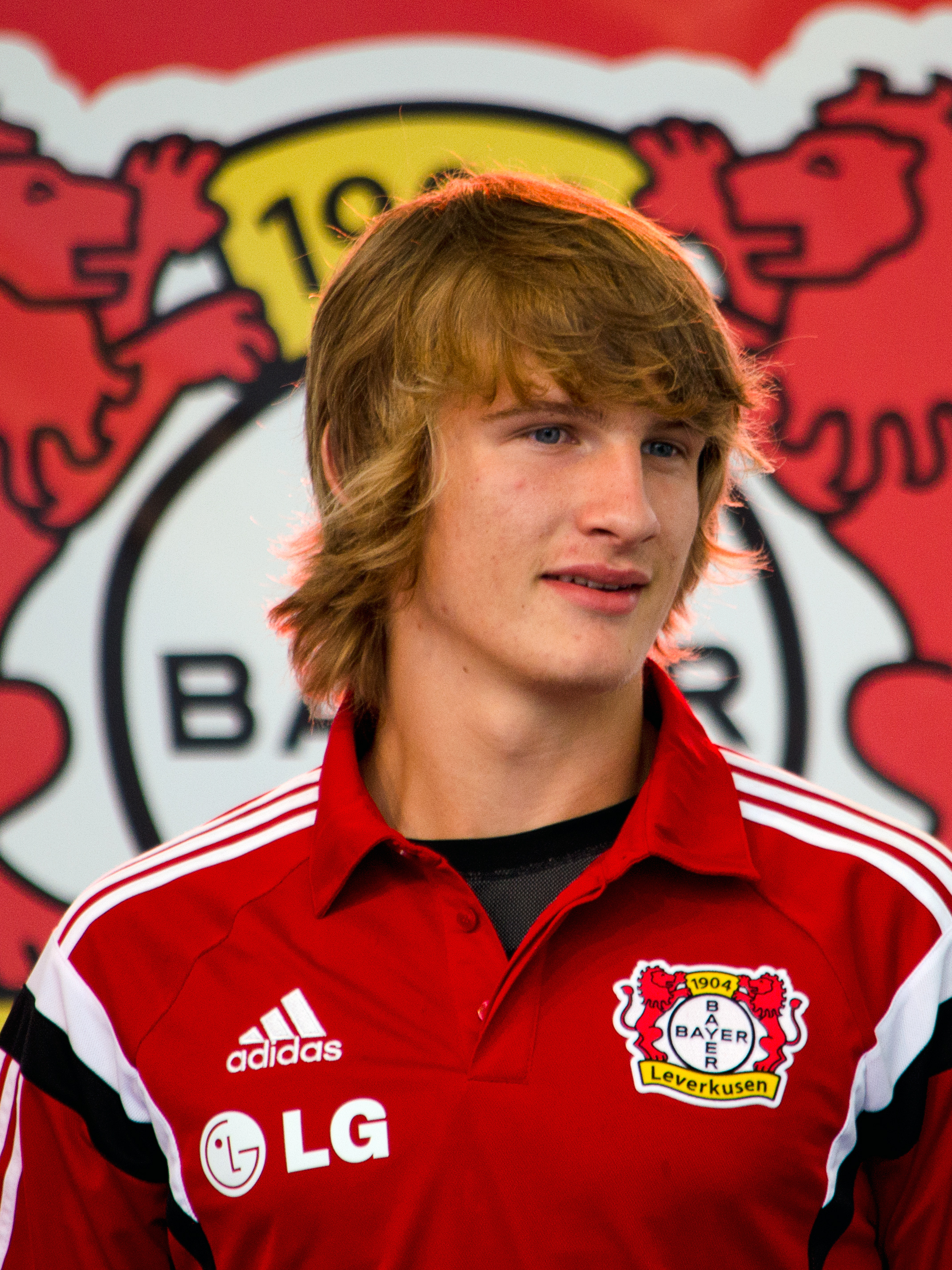
Jedvaj with Bayer Leverkusen in 2014

On 11 June 2014, Bayer Leverkusen announced that they had reached an agreement with all parties for a loan agreement with Roma and Jedvaj, allowing Jedvaj to join Bayer on loan until the end of the 2015–16 season.

Jedvaj's debut with the Germans – where he contributed significantly while playing all 90 minutes in the first official match of the season – helped the team to a 6–0 victory against Alemannia Waldalgesheim in the first round of the 2014–15 DFB-Pokal. Just a few days later, on 19 August, Jedvaj made his debut with the Germans in the UEFA Champions League, replacing teammate Giulio Donati in the 46th minute in Bayer's 3–2 away victory in Denmark over Copenhagen in the 2014–15 UEFA Champions League play-off round. Jedvaj played the second half well, helping his team to secure an eventual victory. He did, however, receive a yellow card in the 51st minute of the match. Jedvaj also played in the return match against Copenhagen in the Germans' 4–0 victory, allowing Bayer qualification to the Champions League group stage. Jedvaj played all 90 minutes of the match, even earning a penalty on the half-hour mark of which striker Stefan Kießling converted in an eventual 3–0 victory.

Jedvaj subsequently made his debut in the Bundesliga on 23 August, a 2–0 victory over Borussia Dortmund in the first match of the campaign. He scored his first goal with Bayer early on in the second game of the season, a 4–2 home win against Hertha BSC. Jedvaj scored in the 50th minute, tying the game 1–1 before Bayer eventually went on to win. Jedvaj continued his fine form at Leverkusen by scoring a powerful curving goal against Werder Bremen to give his side a 1–0 lead. He later assisted Son Heung-min for the goal that would tie the game for a final result of 3–3.

On 20 January 2015, Bayer Leverkusen confirmed that they had signed Jedvaj from Roma on a permanent deal and signed a contract with the Croatian defender until 2020. However, Jedvaj was only able to make one appearance in the first half of the 2015–16 season. This was due to a thigh injury that recurred three times. His only appearance came against Hamburger SV in October, where he came on as a substitute. On 29 October 2016, he scored the winning goal in a 2–1 victory against VfL Wolfsburg.

==== Loan to Augsburg ====
On 20 August 2019, Jedvaj was loaned out to fellow Bundesliga club FC Augsburg until the end of 2019–20 season. On 17 December, he scored the second goal in a 3–0 victory over Fortuna Düsseldorf. On 16 May 2020, he scored the only goal in a 2–1 defeat to VfL Wolfsburg. Upon return to Leverkusen in summer 2020, Jedvaj was completely sidelined by coach Peter Bosz, playing only in the Europa League.

=== Lokomotiv Moscow ===
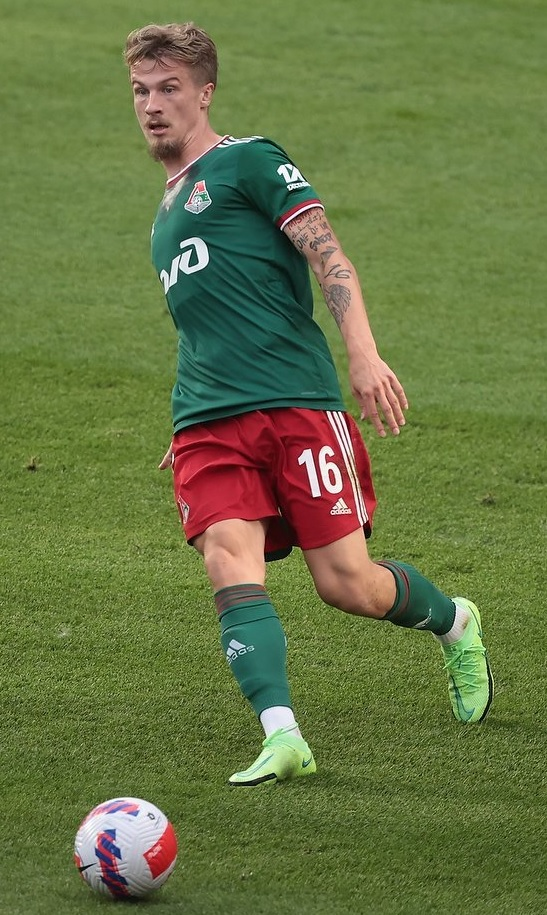
Jedvaj playing for Lokomotiv Moscow in 2021

On 24 July 2021, Jedvaj signed a four-year deal with Russian Premier League club Lokomotiv Moscow. He was brought in to replace his compatriot Vedran Ćorluka, who had retired from football. He made his debut on 6 August as a 46th-minute substitute in the 1–1 league draw with Ufa. He scored his first goal for Lokomotiv on 25 October in a 2–1 victory over Sochi.

==== Loan to Al Ain ====
On 20 December 2022, Jedvaj moved on loan to Al Ain in the United Arab Emirates until the end of the season, with an option to buy.

=== Panathinaikos ===
On 14 July 2023, Lokomotiv announced that Jedvaj would move to Super League Greece club Panathinaikos on a season-long loan. On 28 May 2024, Lokomotiv confirmed that Panathinaikos signed Jedvaj permanently. Subsequently, he had signed a new contract with Panathinaikos until 2027.

=== Al Shabab ===
In July 2026, Jedvaj joined Saudi Pro League club Al Shabab.

== International career ==
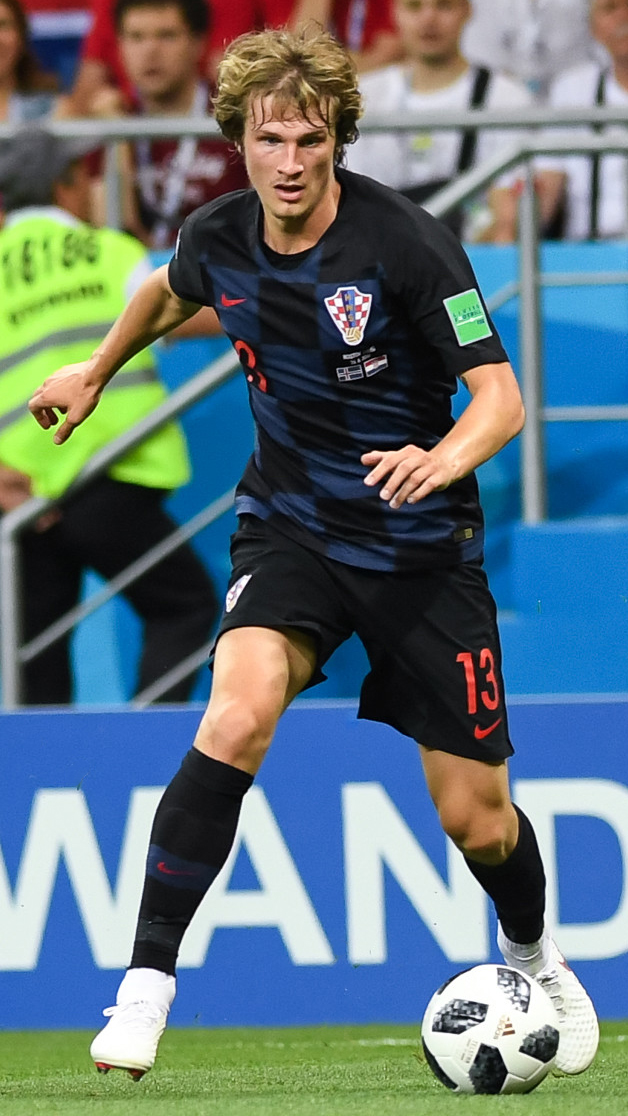
Jedvaj with Croatia at the 2018 FIFA World Cup

Jedvaj represented Croatia at various youth levels. He made his senior debut at age 18, playing the final 13 minutes in a friendly match against Cyprus on 4 September 2014 at Stadion Aldo Drosina in Pula. On 31 May 2016, he was confirmed to be a part of the Croatia squad for UEFA Euro 2016. He was selected to start a match against Spain, which Croatia won 2–1. In May 2018, he was named in Croatia's preliminary 32-man squad for the 2018 FIFA World Cup in Russia. He featured once during the tournament, playing the whole ninety minutes of a 2–1 victory over Iceland. Croatia finished the tournament as runners-up to France. On 16 November 2018, he scored two goals in a UEFA Nations League group match against Spain, including the winner in a 3–2 victory. During Euro 2020 qualifying, Jedvaj played regularly, replacing injured right back Šime Vrsaljko and appearing in five out of eight games. However, ahead of Nations League matches against Sweden and Portugal, Jedvaj was dropped from the national team.

== Personal life ==
Jedvaj's father Zdenko is a former footballer. During the Bosnian War, his family left Mostar, Bosnia and Herzegovina, and moved to the Croatian capital of Zagreb. In June 2022, Jedvaj married his long-time girlfriend Dina Dragija in Varaždin.

In May 2020, Jedvaj appeared in the music video for the song "Poziv" (Call) by Serbian rapper Cvija.

== Career statistics ==
=== Club ===
As of match played 6 May 2025

Appearances and goals by club, season and competition
Club	Season	League			National cup (Note: Includes DFB-Pokal, Russian Cup, UAE President's Cup, Greek Cup)		League cup (Note: Includes UAE League Cup)		Continental		Other		Total	
Club	Season	Division	Apps	Goals	Apps	Goals	Apps	Goals	Apps	Goals	Apps	Goals	Apps	Goals
Dinamo Zagreb	2012–13	Prva HNL	13	1	0	0	—		0	0	—		13	1
Dinamo Zagreb	2013–14	Prva HNL	—		—		—		—		1 (Note: Appearance in Croatian Super Cup)	0	1	0
Dinamo Zagreb	Total		13	1	0	0	—		0	0	1	0	14	1
Roma	2013–14	Serie A	2	0	0	0	—		—		—		2	0
Bayer Leverkusen	2014–15	Bundesliga	22	2	2	0	—		5 (Note: Appearances in UEFA Champions League)	0	—		29	2
Bayer Leverkusen	2015–16	Bundesliga	15	0	0	0	—		3 (Note: Appearances in UEFA Europa League)	0	—		18	0
Bayer Leverkusen	2016–17	Bundesliga	18	1	1	0	—		4	0	—		23	1
Bayer Leverkusen	2017–18	Bundesliga	10	0	0	0	—		—		—		10	0
Bayer Leverkusen	2018–19	Bundesliga	16	0	2	1	—		3	1	—		21	2
Bayer Leverkusen	2020–21	Bundesliga	4	0	0	0	—		4	0	—		8	0
Bayer Leverkusen	Total		85	3	5	1	—		19	1	—		109	5
FC Augsburg (loan)	2019–20	Bundesliga	31	2	0	0	—		—		—		31	2
Lokomotiv Moscow	2021–22	Russian Premier League	20	2	0	0	—		5	0	—		25	2
Lokomotiv Moscow	2022–23	Russian Premier League	14	0	2	0	—		—		—		16	0
Lokomotiv Moscow	Total		34	2	2	0	—		5	0	—		41	2
Al Ain (loan)	2022–23	UAE Pro League	11	1	5	0	1	0	—		1 (Note: Appearance in UAE Super Cup)	0	18	1
Panathinaikos (loan)	2023–24	Super League Greece	24	2	6	0	—		10 (Note: Six appearances in UEFA Champions League, four appearances in UEFA Europa League)	0	—		40	2
Panathinaikos	2024–25	Super League Greece	20	1	2	0	—		10 (Note: Four appearances in UEFA Europa League, six appearances in UEFA Europa Conference League)	0	—		29	0
Panathinaikos	Total		44	3	9	0	—		20	0	—		72	2
Career total			220	12	20	1	1	0	44	1	2	0	287	13

=== International ===
As of match played on 7 October 2020

Appearances and goals by national team and year
National team	Year	Apps	Goals
Croatia	2014	2	0
Croatia	2015	1	0
Croatia	2016	2	0
Croatia	2017	4	0
Croatia	2018	9	2
Croatia	2019	6	0
Croatia	2020	2	0
Total		26	2

As of match played on 7 October 2020
Scores and results list Croatia's goal tally first, score column indicates score after each Jedvaj goal

List of international goals scored by Tin Jedvaj
No.	Date	Venue	Cap	Opponent	Score	Result	Competition
1	15 November 2018	Stadion Maksimir, Zagreb, Croatia	17	Spain	2–1	3–2	2018–19 UEFA Nations League A
2	15 November 2018	Stadion Maksimir, Zagreb, Croatia	17	Spain	3–2	3–2	2018–19 UEFA Nations League A

== Honours ==
=== Clubs ===
Dinamo Zagreb

- Prva HNL: 2012–13
- Croatian Super Cup: 2013

Panathinaikos

- Greek Cup: 2023–24

=== International ===
- FIFA World Cup runner-up: 2018

=== Individual ===
- Croatian Football Hope of the Year: 2014
- Super League Greece Best Goal: 2025–26 Regular season (Matchday 11)

Orders

- Order of Duke Branimir: 2018
