= Filip Đuričić =

Serbian footballer

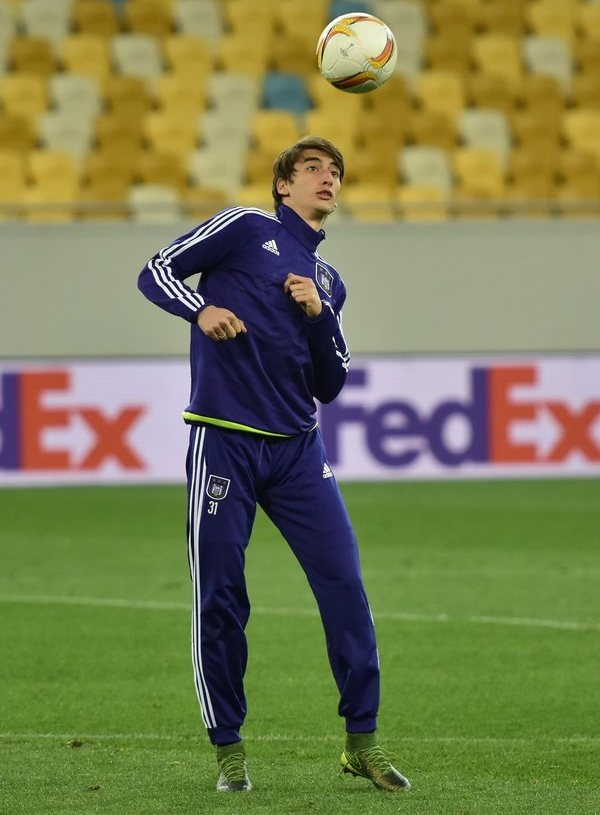
- Đuričić with Anderlecht in 2016

Personal information
- Full name: Filip Đuričić
- Date of birth: 30 January 1992 (age 34)
- Place of birth: Belgrade, SR Serbia, Yugoslavia
- Height: 1.81 m (5 ft 11 in)
- Position: Attacking midfielder

Team information
- Current team: APOEL
- Number: 31

Youth career
- Obrenovac 1905
- Red Star Belgrade
- 2007–2008: Olympiacos

Senior career*
Years	Team	Apps	(Gls)
2008–2009	Radnički Obrenovac	15	(3)
2010–2013	Heerenveen	99	(20)
2013–2016	Benfica	12	(0)
2014–2015	→ Mainz 05 (loan)	11	(0)
2015	→ Southampton (loan)	9	(0)
2016	→ Anderlecht (loan)	17	(1)
2016–2018	Sampdoria	20	(0)
2018	→ Benevento (loan)	15	(0)
2018–2022	Sassuolo	96	(14)
2022–2023	Sampdoria	32	(3)
2023–2026	Panathinaikos	67	(13)
2026–	APOEL	10	(1)

International career^{‡}
2009–2015	Serbia U21	20	(4)
2012–2023	Serbia	44	(5)
- * Club domestic league appearances and goals as of 22 November 2026 ‡ National team caps and goals as of 19 November 2023

Filip Đuričić (Serbian Cyrillic: Филип Ђуричић; born 30 January 1992) is a Serbian professional footballer who plays as an attacking midfielder for Cypriot First Division club APOEL and the Serbia national team.

== Club career ==
=== Early career ===
Born in Obrenovac, Belgrade, Đuričić began playing football at local club Obrenovac 1905, before joining Red Star Belgrade's youth system. In 2007, he moved abroad to Greece and spent one year with Olympiacos. Afterwards, Đuričić played senior football at his hometown club Radnički Obrenovac in the third tier Serbian League Belgrade (fifteen games and three goals in the 2008–09 season), before joining Heerenveen in January 2010.

=== Benfica ===
On 23 February 2013, it was confirmed that Đuričić – along with fellow national team player Miralem Sulejmani – had passed medical tests and committed to a five-year contract with Benfica from summer 2013; with the Portuguese club spending €6 million to secure his services. One week later, Benfica revealed that the contract which Đuričić had signed contained a release clause that valued him at €40 million. Đuričić made his debut for Benfica on 18 August 2013, where he scored his first goal against Anderlecht in the 2013–14 UEFA Champions League.

==== Loan moves ====
With a limited playing time throughout the 2013–14 season, Đuričić moved to Mainz 05 on a one-year loan on 23 July 2014, with the option to make the move permanent for €12.5 million. He made his debut at Mainz on 15 August 2014 in a DFB-Pokal match against Chemnitzer FC. On 2 February 2015, Đuričić moved to Premier League club Southampton on loan until the end of the season. On 25 January 2016, he joined Belgian club Anderlecht on loan until June.

=== Italy ===
After initially joining Sampdoria on loan until the end of the 2016–17 season in summer 2016, Đuričić signed permanently in January 2017. His contract with Sampdoria expired in summer 2018.

In late June 2018, Đuričić signed a four-year contract with Sassuolo. In October 2019, his form improved under coach Roberto De Zerbi, scoring a goal in a 4–3 loss against Inter Milan on 20 October. Five days later, in a 1–0 victory against Hellas Verona.

On 1 August 2022, Đuričić returned to Sampdoria on a two-year contract with an option to extend.

=== Panathinaikos ===
In June 2023, Đuričić signed a two-year contract with Super League Greece club Panathinaikos. The team announced the end of their collaboration at 12/06/2026.

=== APOEL FC ===
24 July 2026: APOEL announced an agreement in principle with Serbian attacking midfielder Filip Duricic. The experienced international, who has played for Heerenveen, Benfica, Mainz 05, Southampton, Anderlecht, Sampdoria, Sassuolo and Panathinaikos, was set to join the club's pre-season training camp in the Netherlands to undergo medical and fitness tests before completing the transfer.

== International career ==
Đuričić made his debut for the Serbia national team on 29 February 2012 in a friendly match against Cyprus. The same year on 11 September, he scored his first senior goal against Wales in the 2014 FIFA World Cup qualifying.

In November 2022, he was selected in Serbia's squad for the 2022 FIFA World Cup in Qatar. He played in group stage matches against Cameroon and Switzerland. Serbia finished fourth in the group.

== Career statistics ==
=== Club ===
As of 13 May 2026

Appearances and goals by club, season and competition
Club	Season	League			National cup (Note: Includes KNVB Cup, Taça de Portugal, DFB-Pokal, Coppa Italia)		League cup (Note: Includes Taça da Liga)		Europe		Total	
Club	Season	Division	Apps	Goals	Apps	Goals	Apps	Goals	Apps	Goals	Apps	Goals
Radnički Obrenovac	2008–09	Serbian League Belgrade	15	3	—		—		—		15	3
Heerenveen	2009–10	Eredivisie	9	1	0	0	—		0	0	9	1
Heerenveen	2010–11	Eredivisie	24	2	1	0	—		—		25	2
Heerenveen	2011–12	Eredivisie	34	10	5	3	—		—		39	13
Heerenveen	2012–13	Eredivisie	32	7	1	1	—		4 (Note: Appearances in UEFA Europa League)	2	37	10
Heerenveen	Total		99	20	7	4	—		4	2	110	26
Benfica	2013–14	Primeira Liga	11	0	3	0	2	1	6 (Note: Three appearances and one goal in UEFA Champions League, three appearances in UEFA Europa League)	1	22	2
Benfica	2015–16	Primeira Liga	1	0	0	0	1	0	0	0	2	0
Benfica	Total		12	0	3	0	3	1	6	1	24	2
Mainz 05 (loan)	2014–15	Bundesliga	11	0	1	0	—		0	0	12	0
Southampton (loan)	2014–15	Premier League	9	0	0	0	0	0	—		9	0
Anderlecht (loan)	2015–16	Belgian Pro League	17	1	0	0	—		3	0	20	1
Sampdoria	2016–17	Serie A	19	0	2	0	—		—		21	0
Sampdoria	2017–18	Serie A	1	0	1	0	—		—		2	0
Sampdoria	Total		20	0	3	0	—		—		23	0
Benevento (loan)	2017–18	Serie A	15	0	0	0	—		—		15	0
Sassuolo	2018–19	Serie A	23	2	2	0	—		—		25	2
Sassuolo	2019–20	Serie A	29	5	1	0	—		—		30	5
Sassuolo	2020–21	Serie A	32	5	1	0	—		—		33	5
Sassuolo	2021–22	Serie A	12	2	0	0	—		—		12	2
Sassuolo	Total		96	14	4	0	—		—		100	14
Sampdoria	2022–23	Serie A	32	3	2	1	—		—		34	4
Panathinaikos	2023–24	Super League Greece	19	3	3	0	—		11 (Note: Six appearances in UEFA Champions League, five appearances UEFA Europa League)	1	33	4
Panathinaikos	2024–25	Super League Greece	28	7	2	1	—		14 (Note: Seven appearances in UEFA Europa Conference League, four appearances UEFA Europa League)	3	44	11
Panathinaikos	2025–26	Super League Greece	20	3	0	0	—		3 (Note: Two appearances and one goal in UEFA Champions League, one appearances UEFA Europa League)	1	23	4
Panathinaikos	Total		67	13	5	1	—		28	5	100	19
Career total			393	54	25	6	3	1	41	8	462	69

=== International ===
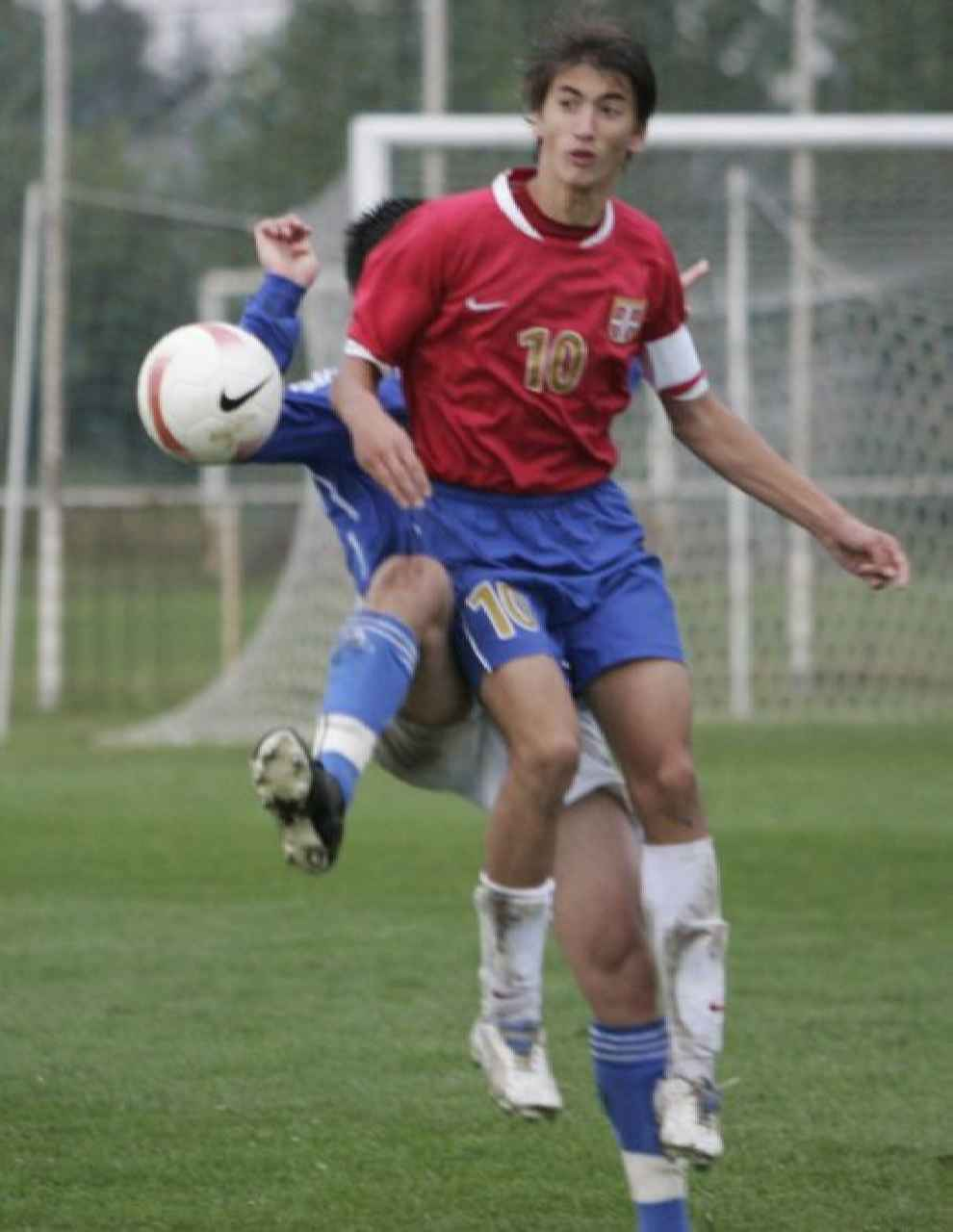
Đuričić in 2009

As of match played 19 November 2023

Appearances and goals by national team and year
National team	Year	Apps	Goals
Serbia	2012	8	2
Serbia	2013	7	2
Serbia	2014	4	0
Serbia	2015	3	0
Serbia	2016	2	0
Serbia	2017	0	0
Serbia	2018	0	0
Serbia	2019	1	0
Serbia	2020	4	0
Serbia	2021	5	0
Serbia	2022	5	1
Serbia	2023	5	0
Total		44	5

Scores and results list Serbia's goal tally first, score column indicates score after each Đuričić goal.

List of international goals scored by Filip Đuričić
No.	Date	Venue	Opponent	Score	Result	Competition
1	11 September 2012	Karađorđe Stadium, Novi Sad, Serbia	Wales	3–1	6–1	2014 FIFA World Cup qualification
2	14 November 2012	Kybunpark, St. Gallen, Switzerland	Chile	3–0	3–1	Friendly
3	26 March 2013	Karađorđe Stadium, Novi Sad, Serbia	Scotland	1–0	2–0	2014 FIFA World Cup qualification
4	26 March 2013	Karađorđe Stadium, Novi Sad, Serbia	Scotland	2–0	2–0	2014 FIFA World Cup qualification
5	18 November 2022	Bahrain National Stadium, Riffa, Bahrain	Bahrain	4–1	5–1	Friendly

== Honours ==
Panathinaikos

- Greek Football Cup: 2023–24
