= 2023–24 Panathinaikos F.C. season =

Panathinaikos
2023–24 season
- Chairman: Giannis Alafouzos
- Manager: Ivan Jovanović (until 26 December); Fatih Terim (until 17 May); Christos Kontis (from 17 May)
- Stadium: Leoforos Alexandras Stadium; Athens Olympic Stadium
- Super League: 4th (Play-offs); 4th (Regular season)
- Greek Cup: Winners
- UEFA Champions League: Play-off round
- UEFA Europa League: Group stage
- Top goalscorer: League: Fotis Ioannidis (15); All: Fotis Ioannidis (23)
- Highest home attendance: 63,890 (vs Braga) (29 August 2023)
- Lowest home attendance: 7,546 (vs Lamia) (14 April 2024)
Home colours	Away colours	Third colours

The 2023–24 season was the 116th season in the existence of Panathinaikos F.C. and the 65rd competitive season in the top flight of Greek football. They competed in the Greek Super League, the Greek Cup, the UEFA Champions League and the UEFA Europa League. The season began on 25 July 2023 and finished on 25 May 2024.

On 25 May 2024, Panathinaikos defeated Aris in the Greek Cup final to win the domestic cup for the 20th time in club's history.

== Players ==
=== Current squad ===
As of 24 January 2024

No.	Name	Nationality	Position (s)	Date of birth (age)	Signed from	Notes
Goalkeepers
12	Yuri Lodygin	(Russia) / (Greece)	GK	26 May 1990 (age 36)	(Greece) PAS Giannina	
15	Vasilios Xenopoulos	(Greece)	GK	20 April 1998 (age 28)	Youth system	
69	Bartłomiej Drągowski	(Poland)	GK	19 August 1997 (age 29)	(Italy) Spezia	On loan
91	Alberto Brignoli	(Italy)	GK	19 August 1991 (age 35)	(Italy) Empoli	
Defenders
2	Georgios Vagiannidis	(Greece)	RB / RM	12 September 2001 (age 25)	(Italy) Inter Milan	
3	Juan Carlos	(Spain)	LB / LM	30 March 1990 (age 36)	(Spain) Málaga	
5	Bart Schenkeveld	(Netherlands)	CB	28 August 1991 (age 35)	(Australia) Melbourne City	
14	Erik Palmer-Brown	(United States)	CB	24 April 1997 (age 29)	(France) Troyes	
20	Vitor Hugo	(Brazil)	CB	20 May 1991 (age 35)	(Brazil) Bahia	On loan
21	Tin Jedvaj	(Croatia)	CB	28 November 1995 (age 30)	(Russia) Lokomotiv Moscow	On loan
23	Hörður Magnússon	(Iceland)	CB	11 March 1993 (age 33)	(Russia) CSKA Moscow	
24	Georgios Sideras	(Greece)	CB	30 March 2002 (age 24)	Youth system	
25	Filip Mladenović	(Serbia)	LB	15 August 1991 (age 35)	(Poland) Legia Warsaw	
27	Giannis Kotsiras	(Greece)	RB / RM	16 December 1992 (age 33)	(Greece) Asteras Tripolis	
94	Samet Akaydin	(Turkey)	CB	13 May 1994 (age 32)	(Turkey) Fenerbahçe	On loan
Midfielders
4	Rubén Pérez	(Spain)	DM / MF	26 April 1989 (age 37)	(Spain) Leganés	
6	Zeca	(Portugal) / (Greece)	MF	31 August 1988 (age 38)	(Denmark) Copenhagen	
8	Anastasios Bakasetas	(Greece)	AM	28 June 1993 (age 33)	(Turkey) Trabzonspor	
10	Bernard	(Brazil) (Spain)	AM / LW	8 September 1992 (age 34)	(United Arab Emirates) Sharjah	
11	Dimitrios Limnios	(Greece) / (Brazil)	RW / LW	27 May 1998 (age 25)	(Germany) 1. FC Köln	
16	Adam Gnezda Čerin	(Slovenia)	MF	16 July 1999 (age 27)	(Germany) 1. FC Nürnberg	
17	Daniel Mancini	(Argentina) / (Italy)	RW	11 November 1996 (age 29)	(Greece) Aris Thessaloniki	
22	Aitor Cantalapiedra	(Spain)	RW / LW	10 February 1996 (age 30)	(Netherlands) Twente	
31	Filip Đuričić	(Serbia)	AM	30 January 1992 (age 34)	(Italy) Sampdoria	
34	Sebastián Palacios	(Argentina)	RW	20 January 1992 (age 34)	Independiente	
52	Tonny Vilhena	(Netherlands) / (Angola)	MF	3 January 1995 (age 31)	(Spain) Espanyol	
55	Willian Arão	(Brazil)	CB / MF	12 March 1992 (age 34)	(Turkey) Fenerbahçe	
77	Benjamin Verbič	(Slovenia)	LW / RW	27 November 1993 (age 32)	(Ukraine) Dynamo Kyiv	
90	Leandro Frroku	(Albania) / (Greece)	MF	3 September 2003 (age 23)	Youth system	
Forwards
7	Fotis Ioannidis	(Greece)	CF	10 January 2000 (age 26)	(Greece) Levadiakos	
9	Andraž Šporar	(Slovenia)	CF	27 February 1994 (age 32)	(Portugal) Sporting CP	
29	Alexander Jeremejeff	(Sweden) / (Russia)	CF	12 October 1993 (age 32)	(Sweden) BK Häcken	

== Transfers ==
=== Summer window ===
==== In ====
Squad #	Position	Player	Transferred From	Fee	Date	Ref
29	FW	(Sweden) / (Russia) Alexander Jeremejeff	(Greece) Levadiakos	Loan return	30 June 2023	
--	MF	(Brazil) Jonas Toró	(Greece) Levadiakos	Loan return	30 June 2023	
--	MF	(Portugal) António Xavier	(Greece) Levadiakos	Loan return	30 June 2023	
6	MF	(Portugal) (Greece) Zeca	(Denmark) Copenhagen	Free	1 July 2023	
25	DF	(Serbia) Filip Mladenović	(Poland) Legia Warsaw	Free	1 July 2023	
31	MF	(Serbia) Filip Đuričić	(Italy) Sampdoria	Free	1 July 2023	
52	MF	(Netherlands) / (Angola) Tonny Vilhena	(Spain) Espanyol	€3,000,000	7 July 2023	
21	DF	(Croatia) Tin Jedvaj	(Russia) Lokomotiv Moscow	Loan	15 July 2023	
14	DF	(United States) Erik Palmer-Brown	(France) Troyes	€1,500,000	2 August 2023	
55	MF	(Brazil) Willian Arão	(Turkey) Fenerbahçe	€2,500,000	17 August 2023	
--	MF	(Greece) Georgios Nikas	(Greece) Levadiakos	Undisclosed	11 September 2023	

==== Out ====
Squad #	Position	Player	Transferred To	Fee	Date	Ref
6	DF	(Poland) Tymoteusz Puchacz	(Germany) Union Berlin	End of loan	30 June 2023	
14	DF	(Argentina) Facundo Sánchez	(Cyprus) AEK Larnaca	End of contract	30 June 2023	
21	MF	(Greece) Dimitrios Kourbelis	(Turkey) Trabzonspor	End of contract	30 June 2023	
31	DF	(Croatia) Zvonimir Šarlija	(Croatia) Hajduk Split	End of contract	30 June 2023	
44	DF	(Greece) Achilleas Poungouras	(Turkey) Sivasspor	End of contract	30 June 2023	
57	MF	(Portugal) António Xavier	(Portugal) Tondela	End of contract	30 June 2023	
--	MF	(Brazil) Jonas Toró	(Brazil) Botafogo-SP	Loan	10 July 2023	
19	MF	(France) Alexis Trouillet	(Greece) Volos	Loan	17 July 2023	
99	FW	(Greece) Argyris Kampetsis	(Hungary) Diósgyőr	Free	21 July 2023	
11	DF	(Romania) / (Spain) Cristian Ganea	(Romania) FCSB	Free	4 September 2023	
--	MF	(Greece) Georgios Nikas	(Greece) Levadiakos	Loan	11 September 2023	

=== Winter window ===
==== In ====
Squad #	Position	Player	Transferred From	Fee	Date	Ref
11	MF	(Greece) / (Brazil) Dimitrios Limnios	(Germany) 1. FC Köln	Undisclosed	1 January 2024	
94	DF	(Turkey) Samet Akaydin	(Turkey) Fenerbahçe	Loan	14 January 2024	
69	GK	(Poland) Bartłomiej Drągowski	(Italy) Spezia	Loan	19 January 2024	
8	MF	(Greece) Anastasios Bakasetas	(Turkey) Trabzonspor	€1,000,000	22 January 2024	
20	DF	(Brazil) Vitor Hugo	(Brazil) Bahia	Loan	23 January 2024	

==== Out ====
Squad #	Position	Player	Transferred To	Fee	Date	Ref
8	MF	(Hungary) László Kleinheisler	(Croatia) Hajduk Split	Loan	2 January 2024	
18	MF	(Albania) Enis Çokaj	(Croatia) Osijek	Loan	24 January 2024	

== Pre-season and friendlies ==
Win Draw Loss Fixtures

26 June 2023 Friendly	Wiener Viktoria	0–4	Panathinaikos	Bad Erlach, Austria
19:30		Report	11' (o.g.) Grozdnik; 23' Jeremejeff; 63' Kaloskamis; 70+1' Bilal	Stadium: Sportplatz Bad Erlach
Note: 75-minute match (45+30 minutes).

30 June 2023 Friendly	Rogaška	1–3	Panathinaikos	Mattersburg, Austria
19:00	Zdunić 83'	Report	25' Ioannidis; 37' Bernard; 63' Magnússon	Stadium: Pappelstadion

4 July 2023 Friendly	FC Petrolul Ploiești	0–2	Panathinaikos	Mattersburg, Austria
19:00		Report	23' Verbič; 76' Vagiannidis	Stadium: Pappelstadion

5 July 2023 Friendly	CSKA 1948	0–1	Panathinaikos	Rohrbrunn, Austria
19:00		Report	38' Kaloskamis	Stadium: Sportplatz Rohrbrunn

9 July 2023 Friendly	AEK Larnaca	1–3	Panathinaikos	Bad Erlach, Austria
19:00	Lopes 65'	Report	48' Mladenović; 59' Vagiannidis; 63' Jeremejeff	Stadium: Sportplatz Bad Erlach

14 July 2023 Friendly	Panathinaikos	1–1	Hapoel Be'er Sheva	Athens, Greece
22:00	Verbič 30'	Report	43' Stoyanov	Stadium: Leoforos Alexandras Stadium; Referee: Konstantinos Perrakis (Greece)

18 July 2023 Friendly	Panathinaikos	0–1	Rayo Vallecano	Athens, Greece
21:00		Report	57' García	Stadium: Leoforos Alexandras Stadium; Referee: Angelos Evangelou (Greece)

14 March 2024 Friendly	Panathinaikos	5–0	Panathinaikos B	Athens, Greece
11:00	Jeremejeff 10', 43'; Aitor 30', 60'; Đuričić 14'	Report		Stadium: Georgios Kalafatis Sports Center
Note: 60-minute match (30+30 minutes).

== Competitions ==
=== Super League Greece ===
==== League table ====
Pos	Team	Pld	W	D	L	GF	GA	GD	Pts	Qualification or relegation
2	AEK Athens	26	17	8	1	60	25	+35	59	Qualification for the Play-off round
3	Olympiacos	26	18	3	5	58	24	+34	57	Qualification for the Play-off round
4	Panathinaikos	26	17	5	4	62	21	+41	56	Qualification for the Play-off round
5	Aris	26	12	6	8	39	29	+10	42	Qualification for the Play-off round
6	Lamia	26	9	7	10	35	44	−9	34	Qualification for the Play-off round

Source: Super League Greece
Rules for classification: 1) Points; 2) Head-to-head points; 3) Head-to-head goal difference; 4) Goal difference; 5) Goals scored; 6) Play-offs (neutral ground).
(Note: Criterion 6 is only used if needed to decide champion, teams for relegation or teams for UEFA competitions).

==== Regular season ====
8 October 2023 1	Panathinaikos	5–0	Atromitos	Athens, Greece
21:30	Đuričić 3', 59'; Palacios 33'; Šporar 45+1' (pen.); Jeremejeff 90+2'	Report		Stadium: Leoforos Alexandras Stadium; Attendance: 9,761; Referee: Evangelos Manouchos

26 August 2023 2	Panathinaikos	3–0	Volos	Athens, Greece
20:00	Čerin 11'; Ioannidis 37'; Verbič 74'	Report		Stadium: Leoforos Alexandras Stadium; Attendance: 8,671; Referee: Aristotelis Diamantopoulos

3 September 2023 3	PAS Giannina	0–1	Panathinaikos	Ioannina, Greece
21:45		Report	74' Palacios	Stadium: Zosimades Stadium; Attendance: 2,927; Referee: Christos Vergetis

16 September 2023 4	Panetolikos	0–5	Panathinaikos	Agrinio, Greece
20:30		Report	13', 45+1', 64' Bernard; 86' (pen.) Aitor; 90+3' Magnússon	Stadium: Panetolikos Stadium; Attendance: 1,516; Referee: Petros Tsagarakis

25 September 2023 5	Panathinaikos	1–2	AEK Athens	Athens, Greece
21:00	Đuričić 10'	Report	36' Zuber; 70' Pineda	Stadium: Leoforos Alexandras Stadium; Attendance: 13,521; Referee: Simone Sozza

28 September 2023 6	Asteras Tripolis	1–4	Panathinaikos	Tripoli, Greece
20:30	Kaltsas 7'	Report	5' Arão; 31' Verbič; 80' (pen.), 87' Ioannidis	Stadium: Theodoros Kolokotronis Stadium; Attendance: 4,348; Referee: Angelos Evangelou

1 October 2023 7	Panathinaikos	2–2	PAOK	Athens, Greece
19:30	Palacios 32'; Jeremejeff 90+6'	Report	19' Brandon; 58' Živković	Stadium: Leoforos Alexandras Stadium; Attendance: 11,530; Referee: Tiago Martins

22 October 2023 8	Olympiacos	0–3	Panathinaikos	Piraeus, Greece
19:30	Camara 48'	Report	28' Vagiannidis	Stadium: Karaiskakis Stadium; Attendance: 31,914; Referee: Fabio Maresca

29 October 2023 9	Panathinaikos	5–0	Panserraikos	Athens, Greece
19:30	Šporar 1', 43' (pen.); Deligiannidis 10' (o.g.); Čerin 57'; Mancini 77'	Report		Stadium: Leoforos Alexandras Stadium; Attendance: 11,635; Referee: Vassilios Fotias

4 November 2023 10	Lamia	1–2	Panathinaikos	Lamia, Greece
17:30	Carlitos 64'	Report	31' Mladenovic; 90' Šporar	Stadium: Lamia Municipal Stadium; Attendance: 2,554; Referee: Evangelos Manouchos

12 November 2023 11	A.E. Kifisia	0–1	Panathinaikos	Athens, Greece
21:30		Report	58' Mancini	Stadium: Michalis Kritikopoulos Stadium; Attendance: 1,371; Referee: Spyridon Zampalas

26 November 2023 12	Aris	2–0	Panathinaikos	Thessaloniki, Greece
20:30	Morón 43'; Menéndez 72'	Report		Stadium: Kleanthis Vikelidis Stadium; Attendance: 7,313; Referee: Gustavo Coreia

3 December 2023 13	Panathinaikos	4–0	OFI	Athens, Greece
19:30	Ioannidis 34' (pen.), 90+1'; Aitor 62'; Palacios 69'	Report		Stadium: Leoforos Alexandras Stadium; Attendance: 10,944; Referee: Thanasis Tzilos

17 December 2023 14	Atromitos	3–2	Panathinaikos	Athens, Greece
20:30	González 45+2'; Vergos 50'; Robail 64'	Report	38' (pen.), 90+3' (pen.) Ioannidis	Stadium: Peristeri Stadium; Attendance: Behind Closed Doors; Referee: Aristotelis Diamantopoulos

20 December 2023 15	Volos	0–3	Panathinaikos	Volos, Greece
19:00		Report	64', 72' Jeremejeff; 66' Arão	Stadium: Panthessaliko Stadium; Attendance: Behind Closed Doors; Referee: Christos Vergetis

3 January 2024 16	Panathinaikos	2–0	PAS Giannina	Athens, Greece
21:00	Ioannidis 25'; Vilhena 48'	Report		Stadium: Leoforos Alexandras Stadium; Attendance: Behind Closed Doors; Referee: Panagiotis Tsiaras

7 January 2024 17	Panathinaikos	2–1	Panetolikos	Athens, Greece
17:00	Šporar 51', 89'	Report	90+2' Shengelia	Stadium: Leoforos Alexandras Stadium; Attendance: Behind Closed Doors; Referee: Vassilios Fotias

14 January 2024 18	AEK Athens	2–2	Panathinaikos	Athens, Greece
20:30	García 24', 90+6'	Report	31' Jedvaj; 66' Arão	Stadium: Agia Sophia Stadium; Attendance: Behind Closed Doors; Referee: Mohammed Al-Hakim

21 January 2024 19	Panathinaikos	2–0	Asteras Tripolis	Athens, Greece
19:30	Aitor 50'; Jedvaj 74'	Report		Stadium: Leoforos Alexandras Stadium; Attendance: Behind Closed Doors; Referee: Anastasios Papapetrou

28 January 2024 20	PAOK	2–1	Panathinaikos	Thessaloniki, Greece
20:30	Despodov 43', 56'	Report	51' Bakasetas	Stadium: Toumba Stadium; Attendance: Behind Closed Doors; Referee: Rohit Saggi

4 February 2024 21	Panathinaikos	2–0	Olympiacos	Athens, Greece
21:00	Bernard 25'; Jeremejeff 60'	Report		Stadium: Leoforos Alexandras Stadium; Attendance: Behind Closed Doors; Referee: Sven Jablonski

11 February 2024 22	Panserraikos	0–3	Panathinaikos	Serres, Greece
17:00		Report	8' Verbič; 31' Palacios; 90+1' Jeremejeff	Stadium: Serres Municipal Stadium; Attendance: Behind Closed Doors; Referee: Christos Vergetis

17 February 2024 23	Panathinaikos	2–2	Lamia	Athens, Greece
20:30	Bernard 45+3'; Jeremejeff 59'	Report	45+1' Carlitos; 68' Tsiloulis	Stadium: Leoforos Alexandras Stadium; Attendance: 10,087; Referee: Spyridon Zampalas

25 February 2024 24	Panathinaikos	1–1	A.E. Kifisia	Athens, Greece
20:00	Palacios 37'	Report	68' Milićević	Stadium: Leoforos Alexandras Stadium; Attendance: 9,669; Referee: Angelos Evangelou

28 February 2024 25	Panathinaikos	2–0	Aris	Athens, Greece
21:00	Bakasetas 3'; Ioannidis 52' (pen.)	Report		Stadium: Leoforos Alexandras Stadium; Attendance: 8,323; Referee: Mohammed Al-Hakim

3 March 2024 26	OFI	2–2	Panathinaikos	Heraklion, Greece
19:30	Jimenez 21'; Iseka 81'	Report	35' Ioannidis; 83' Sporar	Stadium: Theodoros Vardinogiannis Stadium; Attendance: 5,100; Referee: Christos Vergetis

==== Play-off round ====
Pos	Team	Pld	W	D	L	GF	GA	GD	Pts	Qualification
1	PAOK (C)	36	25	5	6	87	34	+53	80	Qualification for the Champions League second qualifying round
2	AEK Athens	36	23	9	4	80	35	+45	78	Qualification for the Conference League second qualifying round
3	Olympiacos	36	23	5	8	78	36	+42	74	Qualification for the Europa League league phase (Note: Olympiacos qualified for the Europa League league phase as 2023–24 UEFA Europa Conference League winners.)
4	Panathinaikos	36	22	6	8	82	37	+45	72	Qualification for the Europa League second qualifying round (Note: Panathinaikos qualified for the Europa League second qualifying round as 2023–24 Greek Cup winners.)
5	Aris	36	16	7	13	51	44	+7	55	
6	Lamia	36	9	8	19	43	79	−36	35	

Source: Super League Greece
Rules for classification: 1) Points; 2) Head-to-head points (Regular season and play-off); 3) Head-to-head goal difference (Regular season and play-off); 4) Regular season position.
(C) Champions
Notes:

10 March 2024 1	Olympiacos	1–3	Panathinaikos	Piraeus, Greece
20:30	Podence 23'	Report	41' Bakasetas; 45+4', 70' Ioannidis	Stadium: Karaiskakis Stadium; Attendance: 31,500; Referee: Daniel Schlager

31 March 2024 2	Panathinaikos	2–3	PAOK	Athens, Greece
18:00	Bernard 29', 90+3'	Report	2' Despodov; 37' Thomas; 89' (pen.) Schwab	Stadium: Leoforos Alexandras Stadium; Attendance: 13,209; Referee: Mikkel Redder

3 April 2024 3	Panathinaikos	2–1	AEK Athens	Athens, Greece
21:00	Bakasetas 32'; Ioannidis 34'	Report	5' Vida	Stadium: Leoforos Alexandras Stadium; Attendance: 12,101; Referee: Cláudio Pereira

7 April 2024 4	Aris	0–2	Panathinaikos	Thessaloniki, Greece
19:30		Report	62' Šporar; 90+2' (o.g.) Brabec	Stadium: Kleanthis Vikelidis Stadium; Attendance: 7,503; Referee: Aleksandar Stavrev

14 April 2024 5	Panathinaikos	3–1	Lamia	Athens, Greece
17:00	Čerin 18'; Bernard 60', 87'	Report	14' Slivka	Stadium: Leoforos Alexandras Stadium; Attendance: 7,546; Referee: Anastasios Papapetrou

21 April 2024 6	Lamia	0–5	Panathinaikos	Lamia, Greece
17:00		Report	Ioannidis 54', 61'; Bakasetas 45', 57'; Verbič 23'	Stadium: Lamia Municipal Stadium; Attendance: 5,153; Referee: Angelos Evangelou

24 April 2024 7	AEK Athens	3–0	Panathinaikos	Athens, Greece
20:30	Eliasson 7', 69'; Ponce 38'	Report		Stadium: Agia Sophia Stadium; Attendance: 31,100; Referee: Willy Delajod

28 April 2024 8	Panathinaikos	0–1	Aris	Athens, Greece
20:30		Report	Zamora 2'	Stadium: Leoforos Alexandras Stadium; Attendance: 8,609; Referee: Aliyar Aghayev

15 May 2024 9	PAOK	4–1	Panathinaikos	Thessaloniki, Greece
20:00	Živković 72' (pen.), 90+2'; Vieirinha 89'; Taison 37'	Report	Jeremejeff 78'	Stadium: Toumba Stadium; Attendance: 22,281; Referee: Allard Lindhout

19 May 2024 10	Panathinaikos	2–2	Olympiacos	Athens, Greece
20:00	Bakasetas 45+1' (pen.); Bernard 59'	Report	Podence 73'; Jovetić 81'	Stadium: Leoforos Alexandras Stadium; Attendance: 8,501; Referee: Luís Godinho

=== Greek Cup ===
==== Round of 16 ====
10 January 2024 First leg	Panathinaikos	1–1	Olympiacos	Athens, Greece
21:30	Ioannidis 65'	Report	45' Alexandropoulos	Stadium: Leoforos Alexandras Stadium; Attendance: Behind Closed Doors; Referee: Julian Weinberger

17 January 2024 Second leg	Olympiacos	0–0 (a.e.t.) (1–1 agg.) (6–7 p)	Panathinaikos	Piraeus, Greece
21:00		Report		Stadium: Karaiskakis Stadium; Attendance: Behind Closed Doors; Referee: Dennis Higler
	Penalties
	Rodinei (penalty scored); Martins (penalty scored); Jovetic (penalty scored); Podence (penalty scored); Carvalho (penalty missed); Vrousai (penalty scored); Ortega (penalty scored); Camara (penalty missed)		Aitor (penalty scored); Pérez (penalty scored); Arão (penalty scored); Jedvaj (penalty scored); Mladenović (penalty missed); Kotsiras (penalty scored); Vagiannidis (penalty scored); Schenkeveld (penalty scored)

Quarter-finals

24 January 2024 First leg	Panathinaikos	1–2	Atromitos	Athens, Greece
21:00	Aitor 11'	Report	25' Angielski; 42' Jubitana	Stadium: Leoforos Alexandras Stadium; Attendance: Behind Closed Doors; Referee: Aristotelis Diamantopoulos

31 January 2024 Second leg	Atromitos	0–2 (2–3 agg.)	Panathinaikos	Athens, Greece
19:00		Report	35' Perez; 90+4' Mladenovic	Stadium: Peristeri Stadium; Attendance: Behind Closed Doors; Referee: Angelos Evangelou

Semi-finals

14 February 2024 First leg	PAOK	0–1	Panathinaikos	Thessaloniki, Greece
19:30		Report	53' Sporar	Stadium: Toumba Stadium; Attendance: 18,008; Referee: Allard Lindhout

21 February 2024 Second leg	Panathinaikos	1–2 (2–2 agg.) (6–5 p)	PAOK	Athens, Greece
19:00	Limnios 120+9'	Report	72' Zivkovic; 105' Kedziora	Stadium: Leoforos Alexandras Stadium; Referee: Daniel Siebert
	Penalties
	Sporar (penalty missed); Jeremejeff (penalty scored); Bakasetas (penalty scored); Kotsiras (penalty scored); Mladenovic (penalty scored); Limnios (penalty missed); Mancini (penalty scored); Arao (penalty missed); Schenkeveld (penalty scored)		Koulierakis (penalty scored); Murg (penalty scored); Kedziora (penalty scored); Meite (penalty scored); Despodov (penalty missed); Ozdoyev (penalty missed); Marcos Antonio (penalty scored); Otto (penalty missed); Samatta (penalty missed)

Final

25 May 2024	Panathinaikos	1–0	Aris	Volos, Greece
20:30	Vagiannidis 90+7'	Report		Stadium: Panthessaliko Stadium; Attendance: Behind Closed Doors; Referee: Stéphanie Frappart

=== UEFA Champions League ===
==== Second qualifying round ====
25 July 2023 First leg	Dnipro-1 (Ukraine)	1–3	(Greece) Panathinaikos	Košice, Slovakia
20:00	Tanchyk 90'	Report	10' Šporar; 74' Đuričić; 84' (pen.) Ioannidis	Stadium: Košická futbalová aréna (Note: Due to the Russian invasion of Ukraine, Ukrainian teams are required to play their home matches at neutral venues until further notice.); Attendance: 5,248; Referee: Daniele Chiffi (Italy)

1 August 2023 Second leg	Panathinaikos (Greece)	2–2 (5–3 agg.)	(Ukraine) Dnipro-1	Athens, Greece
20:30	Šporar 15', 70'	Report	24' Dovbyk; 54' Sarapiy	Stadium: Leoforos Alexandras Stadium; Attendance: 14,098; Referee: Bastian Dankert (Germany)

==== Third qualifying round ====
9 August 2023 First leg	Panathinaikos (Greece)	1–0	(France) Marseille	Athens, Greece
21:00	Bernard 83'	Report		Stadium: Leoforos Alexandras Stadium; Attendance: 11,270; Referee: István Kovács (Romania)

15 August 2023 Second leg	Marseille (France)	2–1 (a.e.t.) (2–2 agg.) (3–5 p)	(Greece) Panathinaikos	Marseille, France
21:00	Aubameyang 2', 45+1'	Report	90+9' (pen.) Ioannidis	Stadium: Stade Vélodrome; Attendance: 63,050; Referee: Michael Oliver (England)
	Penalties
	Guendouzi (penalty missed); Veretout (penalty scored); Sarr (penalty scored); Vitinha (penalty scored)		(penalty scored) Ioannidis; (penalty scored) Bernard; (penalty scored) Kleinheisler; (penalty scored) Palacios; (penalty scored) Mladenović

==== Play-off round ====
23 August 2023 First leg	Braga (Portugal)	2–1	(Greece) Panathinaikos	Braga, Portugal
22:00	Ruiz 51'; Djaló 73'	Report	90+5' Mancini	Stadium: Estádio Municipal; Attendance: 23,401; Referee: Felix Zwayer (Germany)

29 August 2023 Second leg	Panathinaikos (Greece)	0–1 (1–3 agg.)	(Portugal) Braga	Athens, Greece
22:00		Report	83' Bruma	Stadium: Olympic Stadium (Athens); Attendance: 63,890; Referee: Daniele Orsato (Italy)

=== UEFA Europa League ===
==== Group stage ====
The draw for the group stage was held on 1 September 2023.

Pos	Team	Pld	W	D	L	GF	GA	GD	Pts	Qualification	VIL	REN	MHA	PAO
1	(Spain) Villarreal	6	4	1	1	9	7	+2	13	Advance to round of 16	—	1–0	0–0	3–2
2	(France) Rennes	6	4	0	2	13	6	+7	12	Advance to knockout round play-offs	2–3	—	3–0	3–1
3	(Israel) Maccabi Haifa	6	1	2	3	3	9	−6	5	Transfer to Europa Conference League	1–2	0–3	—	0–0
4	(Greece) Panathinaikos	6	1	1	4	7	10	−3	4		2–0	1–2	1–2	—

Source: UEFA
Rules for classification: Group stage tiebreakers

21 September 2023 1	Panathinaikos (Greece)	2–0	(Spain) Villarreal	Athens, Greece
19:45	Ioannidis 38'; Šporar 78'	Report		Stadium: Olympic Stadium, Athens (Note: Panathinaikos play their home European matches at the Olympic Stadium, in Athens, instead of their regular stadium, the Leoforos Alexandras Stadium, in Athens.); Attendance: 59,503; Referee: Craig Pawson (England)

5 October 2023 2	Maccabi Haifa (Israel)	0–0	(Greece) Panathinaikos	Haifa, Israel
22:00		Report		Stadium: Sammy Ofer Stadium; Attendance: 29,465; Referee: António Nobre (Portugal)

26 October 2023 3	Panathinaikos (Greece)	1–2	(France) Rennes	Athens, Greece
22:00	Ioannidis 61' (pen.)	Report	7' Gouiri; 49' Kalimuendo	Stadium: Leoforos Alexandras Stadium (Note: Panathinaikos returned to play the remaining of their European games back to their natural home stadium Leoforos Alexandras Stadium, after the closure of Olympic Stadium, due to a problem found with the shelter of the stadium.); Attendance: 13,459; Referee: João Pinheiro (Portugal)

9 November 2023 4	Rennes (France)	3–1	(Greece) Panathinaikos	Rennes, France
19:45	Rieder 9'; Salah 65'; Blas 70' (pen.)	Report	34' (pen.) Ioannidis	Stadium: Roazhon Park; Attendance: 28,004; Referee: Willie Collum (Scotland)

30 November 2023 5	Villarreal (Spain)	3–2	(Greece) Panathinaikos	Villarreal, Spain
22:00	Baena 29'; Comesaña 34'; Morales 47'	Report	66' Palacios; 81' Ioannidis	Stadium: Estadio de la Cerámica; Attendance: 16,993; Referee: Ivan Kružliak (Slovakia)

14 December 2023 6	Panathinaikos (Greece)	1–2	(Israel) Maccabi Haifa	Athens, Greece
19:45	Ioannidis 89'	Report	David 20'; Chery 74'	Stadium: Leoforos Alexandras Stadium; Attendance: 13,121; Referee: Georgi Kabakov (Bulgaria)
