= Georgios Vagiannidis =

Greek footballer (born 2001)

Giorgos Vagiannidis
Personal information
- Full name: Georgios Vagiannidis
- Date of birth: 12 September 2001 (age 25)
- Place of birth: Athens, Greece
- Height: 1.82 m (6 ft 0 in)
- Position: Right-back

Team information
- Current team: Sporting CP
- Number: 13

Youth career
- 2009–2019: Panathinaikos

Senior career*
Years	Team	Apps	(Gls)
2019–2020	Panathinaikos	1	(1)
2020–2021	Inter Milan	0	(0)
2020–2021	→ Sint-Truiden (loan)	0	(0)
2021–2022	Panathinaikos B	13	(0)
2021–2025	Panathinaikos	70	(1)
2025–	Sporting CP	24	(0)

International career^{‡}
2017–2018	Greece U17	4	(0)
2018	Greece U18	1	(0)
2019	Greece U19	4	(1)
2024–	Greece	15	(0)
- * Club domestic league appearances and goals as of 15 August 2026 ‡ National team caps and goals as of 27 September 2026

Georgios Vagiannidis (Greek: Γεώργιος Βαγιαννίδης; born 12 September 2001) is a Greek professional footballer who plays as a right-back for Primeira Liga club Sporting CP and the Greece national team.

== Club career ==
=== Panathinaikos ===
Vagiannidis plays mainly as a right-back and joined Panathinaikos from the team's youth ranks. On 16 February 2020, Vagiannidis made his professional debut and scored his first goal, getting an assist as Panathinaikos beat Panetolikos 3–1 at the Olympic Stadium. In May 2020, Italian giants Inter expressed interest in acquiring the talented young player of Panathinaikos. The 18-year-old right-back had recently reached a verbal agreement with Panathinaikos to sign a new contract before talks were halted due to the Coronavirus pandemic.

=== Inter Milan ===
On 5 June 2020, Vagiannidis has penned a four-year contract with Inter of Serie A. Inter will not need to negotiate with Panathinaikos to land Vagiannidis and will only have to pay a FIFA determined compensation amount of €400,000. The Greek full-back will reportedly earn around €300,000 per year in Milan.

==== Loan to Sint-Truiden ====
On 1 October 2020, Vagiannidis signed with Sint-Truiden on loan. On 3 February 2021, he made his debut with the new club in Belgian Cup against Lokeren-Temse at the Daknamstadion in the season 2020–21.

=== Return to Panathinaikos ===
On 3 September 2021, Panathinaikos officially announced the return of Georgios Vagiannidis, who signed on a free transfer, a four-year contract with the club for an undisclosed fee. Towards the end of 2024 talks between him and the club have begun regarding a new contract signed until 2027.

=== Sporting CP ===
On 6 August 2025, Vagiannidis has penned a five-year contract with Sporting CP of Primeira Liga. The club has reportedly paid Panathinaikos around €12.5 million for Vagiannidis, with an extra €2.5 million potentially added through bonuses linked to specific performance targets. The Greek international has left Athens to join the reigning Portuguese champions, a deal that includes a release clause set at €80 million.

== International career ==
Vagiannidis made his debut for the Greece national team on 7 September 2024 in a Nations League game against Finland at the Karaiskakis Stadium. He substituted Fotis Ioannidis in the 77th minute of Greece's 3–0 victory.

== Player profile ==
=== Playing style ===
Giorgos Vagiannidis primarily plays as a right-back. He is known for his offensive contributions, as evidenced by his ability to score goals and provide assists. He has also played as a right winger and right midfielder in his career. He is known for his attacking contributions, particularly his dribbling and crossing ability. He has also been described as having good pace and being a "mostly explosive" player.

== Career statistics ==
=== Club ===
As of match played 9 October 2026

Appearances and goals by club, season and competition
Club	Season	League			National cup (Note: Includes Belgian Cup, Greek Cup, Taça de Portugal)		League cup (Note: Includes Taça da Liga)		Europe		Total	
Club	Season	Division	Apps	Goals	Apps	Goals	Apps	Goals	Apps	Goals	Apps	Goals
Panathinaikos	2019–20	Super League Greece	1	1	1	0	—		—		2	1
Inter Milan	2020–21	Serie A	0	0	0	0	—		0	0	0	0
Sint-Truiden (loan)	2020–21	Belgian Pro League	0	0	1	0	—		—		1	0
Panathinaikos B	2021–22	Super League Greece 2	13	0	—		—		—		13	0
Panathinaikos	2021–22	Super League Greece	2	0	0	0	—		—		2	0
Panathinaikos	2022–23	Super League Greece	19	0	3	0	—		2 (Note: Appearances in UEFA Europa Conference League)	0	24	0
Panathinaikos	2023–24	Super League Greece	22	0	6	1	—		9 (Note: Four appearances in UEFA Champions League, five appearances in UEFA Europa League)	0	37	1
Panathinaikos	2024–25	Super League Greece	27	1	1	0	—		11 (Note: Two appearances in UEFA Europa League, nine appearances in UEFA Conference League)	0	39	1
Panathinaikos	2025–26	Super League Greece	0	0	0	0	—		1 (Note: Appearance(s) in UEFA Champions League)	0	1	0
Panathinaikos	Total		70	1	10	1	—		23	0	103	2
Sporting CP	2025–26	Primeira Liga	22	0	4	0	1	0	5	0	32	0
Sporting CP	2026–27	Primeira Liga	4	0	0	0	0	0	1	0	5	0
Sporting CP	Total		26	0	4	0	1	0	6	0	37	0
Career total			110	2	16	1	1	0	29	0	156	3

=== International ===
As of match played 27 September 2026

Appearances and goals by national team and year
National team	Year	Apps	Goals
Greece	2024	3	0
Greece	2025	6	0
Greece	2026	6	0
Total		15	0

== Honours ==
Panathinaikos

- Greek Cup: 2021–22, 2023–24

Individual

- Super League Greece Team of the Season: 2024–25
