= Fotis Ioannidis =

Greek footballer (born 2000)

Personal information
- Full name: Fotios Ioannidis
- Date of birth: 10 January 2000 (age 26)
- Place of birth: Chalcis, Greece
- Height: 1.87 m (6 ft 2 in)
- Position: Forward

Team information
- Current team: Sporting CP
- Number: 7

Youth career
- 2014–2016: Olympiacos Chalkida
- 2016–2017: Levadiakos

Senior career*
Years	Team	Apps	(Gls)
2017–2020	Levadiakos	41	(7)
2020–2025	Panathinaikos	139	(36)
2025–	Sporting CP	22	(5)

International career^{‡}
2018	Greece U18	4	(0)
2018	Greece U19	6	(3)
2019–2022	Greece U21	9	(2)
2022–	Greece	25	(7)
- * Club domestic league appearances and goals as of 30 October 2026 ‡ National team caps and goals as of 4 October 2026

Fotis Ioannidis (Greek: Φώτης Ιωαννίδης; born 10 January 2000) is a Greek professional footballer who plays as a forward for Primeira Liga club Sporting CP and the Greece national team.

== Club career ==
=== Levadiakos ===
On 10 December 2018, Ioannidis scored his first goal for the 2018–19 season, in a 1–1 away draw against rivals Panionios. On 24 February 2019, as a substitute, he headed the only goal of a last-minute away win against Xanthi in his club's effort to avoid relegation.

=== Panathinaikos ===
On 10 August 2020, Panathinaikos officially announced the purchase of the young striker, who signed a four-year contract with the club. On 10 February 2022, an MLS club offered more than €2 million for his services, but the offer was rejected.

In his first three seasons, Ioannidis failed to make an impression, but in the 2023–24 he managed to solidify himself in the starting line-up, becoming a key member in Ivan Jovanović's plans. The team came close to qualifying for the Champions League group stage, but lost 3–1 to Braga on aggregate.

On 21 September 2023, Ioannidis scored in a 2–0 home win against Villarreal for the opening matchday of the Europa League group stage. In the aftermath of his impressive performance, several European clubs expressed interest in Ioannidis, with Panathinaikos demanding offers higher than €10 million.

Ioannidis finished the season with 23 goals and 9 assists in all competitions, which resulted in interest from numerous clubs, including Sporting and Girona. In mid-June 2024, newly promoted Ipswich Town offered a €22.5 million record fee for his services, but his team refused to enter negotiations.

=== Sporting CP ===
On 1 September 2025, Fotis Ioannidis was announced by Sporting, with the transfer fee amounting to €22 million plus €3 million in performance-related bonuses, while Panathinaikos retained a 25% sell-on clause. Ioannidis signed a five-year contract with Sporting, which included a €100 million release clause. This transfer became the most expensive in Panathinaikos’ history, surpassing the transfer of Georgios Vagiannidis to Sporting earlier that same summer.

== International career ==
Ioannidis netted a brace against Finland in Greece's first game in the UEFA Nations League campaign on 7 September 2024.

== Personal life ==
Ioannidis’ father, Vasilios, is a former professional international footballer from Thrylorio, Komotini. He played in the first division for Apollon Pontus, Olympiacos and Panionios.

== Career statistics ==
=== Club ===
As of match played 30 October 2026

Appearances and goals by club, season and competition
Club	Season	League			National cup (Note: Includes Greek Cup, Taça de Portugal)		League cup (Note: Includes Taça da Liga)		Continental		Total	
Club	Season	Division	Apps	Goals	Apps	Goals	Apps	Goals	Apps	Goals	Apps	Goals
Levadiakos	2017–18	Super League Greece	5	0	4	0	—		—		9	0
Levadiakos	2018–19	Super League Greece	17	2	3	1	—		—		20	3
Levadiakos	2019–20	Super League Greece 2	19	5	1	0	—		—		20	5
Levadiakos	Total		41	7	8	1	—		—		49	8
Panathinaikos	2020–21	Super League Greece	23	4	1	0	—		—		24	4
Panathinaikos	2021–22	Super League Greece	26	4	7	2	—		—		33	6
Panathinaikos	2022–23	Super League Greece	36	7	4	0	—		2 (Note: Appearances in UEFA Europa Conference League)	0	42	7
Panathinaikos	2023–24	Super League Greece	28	15	4	1	—		12 (Note: Six appearances and two goals in UEFA Champions League, six appearances and five goals in UEFA Europa League)	7	44	23
Panathinaikos	2024–25	Super League Greece	26	6	3	0	—		13 (Note: Two appearances in UEFA Europa League, eight appearances and four goals in UEFA Conference League)	5	42	11
Panathinaikos	2025–26	Super League Greece	0	0	—		—		5 (Note: Two appearances in UEFA Champions League, three appearances in UEFA Europa League)	0	5	0
Panathinaikos	Total		139	36	19	3	—		32	12	190	51
Sporting CP	2025–26	Primeira Liga	13	3	2	2	2	1	5 (Note: Appearances in UEFA Champions League)	0	22	6
Sporting CP	2026–27	Primeira Liga	9	2	0	0	1	0	3	0	13	2
Sporting CP	Total		22	5	2	2	3	1	8	0	35	8
Career total			202	48	29	6	3	1	40	12	274	67

=== International ===
As of match played 1 October 2026

Appearances and goals by national team and year
National team	Year	Apps	Goals
Greece	2022	4	0
Greece	2023	4	1
Greece	2024	6	4
Greece	2025	7	1
Greece	2026	3	1
Total		24	7

Scores and results list Greece's goal tally first, score column indicates score after each Ioannidis goal.

List of international goals scored by Fotis Ioannidis
No.	Date	Venue	Cap	Opponent	Score	Result	Competition
1	21 November 2023	Agia Sophia Stadium, Athens, Greece	8	France	2–1	2–2	UEFA Euro 2024 qualifying
2	21 March 2024	Agia Sophia Stadium, Athens, Greece	9	Kazakhstan	3–0	5–0	UEFA Euro 2024 qualifying
3	7 September 2024	Karaiskakis Stadium, Piraeus, Greece	12	Finland	1–0	3–0	2024-25 UEFA Nations League B
4	7 September 2024	Karaiskakis Stadium, Piraeus, Greece	12	Finland	3–0	3–0	2024-25 UEFA Nations League B
5	10 September 2024	Aviva Stadium, Dublin, Ireland	13	Republic of Ireland	0–1	0–2	2024-25 UEFA Nations League B
6	11 June 2025	Pankritio Stadium, Heraklion, Greece	17	Bulgaria	2–0	4–0	Friendly
7	1 October 2026	Toumba Stadium, Thessaloniki, Greece	24	Netherlands	1–0	2–2	2026-27 UEFA Nations League A

== Honours ==
Panathinaikos

- Greek Cup: 2021–22, 2023–24

Individual

- Super League Greece Greek Footballer of the Season: 2022–23, 2023–24
- Super League Greece Team of the Season: 2022–23, 2023–24
- Panathinaikos Player of the Season: 2023–24
