= László Kleinheisler =

Hungarian footballer

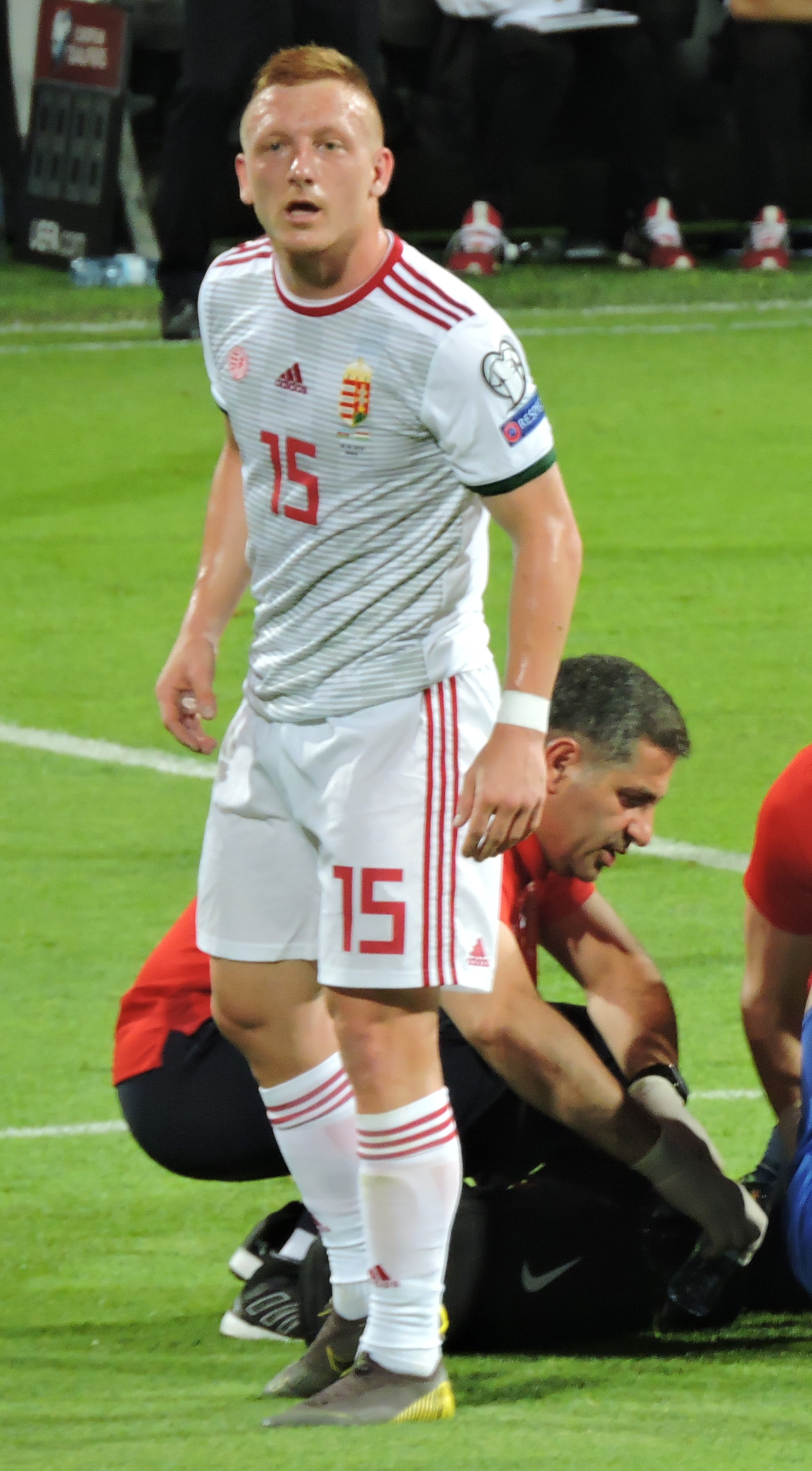
- Kleinheisler with Hungary in 2019

Personal information
- Full name: László Kleinheisler
- Date of birth: 8 April 1994 (age 32)
- Place of birth: Kazincbarcika, Hungary
- Height: 1.70 m (5 ft 7 in)
- Positions: Attacking midfielder; winger

Youth career
- 2004–2005: Pomáz
- 2005–2008: III. Kerület
- 2008–2012: Felcsút
- 2010–2012: → Videoton (loan)

Senior career*
| Years | Team | Apps | (Gls) |
| 2012–2016 | Videoton | 30 | (4) |
| 2012–2013 | → Puskás FC (loan) | 27 | (8) |
| 2015 | → Puskás Akadémia (loan) | 12 | (0) |
| 2016–2018 | Werder Bremen | 6 | (0) |
| 2016–2017 | → Darmstadt (loan) | 12 | (1) |
| 2017 | → Ferencváros (loan) | 10 | (0) |
| 2017–2018 | → Astana (loan) | 20 | (0) |
| 2018–2019 | Astana | 12 | (0) |
| 2019–2023 | Osijek | 111 | (18) |
| 2023–2025 | Panathinaikos | 17 | (2) |
| 2024 | → Hajduk Split (loan) | 12 | (0) |
| 2025 | Grazer AK | 13 | (0) |
| 2026 | FK Csíkszereda | 8 | (1) |

International career^{‡}
| 2010 | Hungary U17 | 3 | (1) |
| 2012 | Hungary U18 | 2 | (1) |
| 2012 | Hungary U19 | 8 | (3) |
| 2013–2015 | Hungary U21 | 12 | (2) |
| 2015–2024 | Hungary | 53 | (3) |
- * Club domestic league appearances and goals as of 16 May 2026 ‡ National team caps and goals as of 19 June 2024

László Kleinheisler (Hungarian: [ˈlaːsloː ˈklɛinhɛiʃlɛr]; born 8 April 1994) is a Hungarian professional footballer who plays as an attacking midfielder or a winger.

== Club career ==
=== Videoton ===
Having joined Hungarian club Videoton FC in 2013, he made his debut in the Hungarian first division on 28 July 2013 against Haladás, while also scoring his first league goal in an eventual 2–0 home win.

On 28 July 2013, he scored his first goal in the 2013–2014 season against Szombathelyi Haladás at the Sóstói Stadion, Székesfehérvár. The match ended with a 2–0 victory for Videoton FC. In the rest of the season he scored another three goals, one against Újpest FC at the Sóstói Stadion on 6 October 2013, one against Mezőkövesd-Zsóry SE in a 1–0 victory at the Sóstói Stadion on 8 November 2013, and the last goal against Diósgyőri VTK at the DVTK Stadion in a 2–2 draw match on 24 November 2013.

In the 2014–2015 season, he played only 370 minutes in 11 appearances for Videoton FC and 911 minutes in 12 appearances for Puskás Akadémia FC. In July 2015, Kleinheisler refused to sign the extension of his contract with Videoton, therefore he was ousted to the reserves for the 2015–2016 season. Videoton refused to sell him to the Ekstraklasa club Śląsk Wrocław in August.

=== Werder Bremen ===
On 20 January 2016, Kleinheisler joined Werder Bremen on a 3.5-year contract for an undisclosed fee. He made his debut in the Bundesliga on 30 January 2016 against Hertha BSC in the Weserstadion. He was brought onto the pitch in the 62nd minute at 2–0 to Berlin and helped Bremen come back from 2–0 and 3–1 deficits to earn a 3–3 draw.

==== Darmstadt 98 (loan) ====
On 13 August 2016, Kleinheisler joined German club Darmstadt 98 for a season-long loan deal. On 22 October 2016, he scored his first goal in the Bundesliga on the 8th match day of the 2016–17 Bundesliga in a 3–1 victory over Wolfsburg. He was selected for the team of week 8 of the 2016–17 Bundesliga season after this goal.

==== Ferencváros (loan) ====
On 20 January 2017, Kleinheisler's loan at Darmstadt was cut short and he joined Ferencváros on loan for the second half of the season.

==== Astana (loan) ====
On 20 June 2017, Kleinheisler joined FC Astana on a year-long loan deal.

=== Osijek ===
On 16 January 2019, Osijek announced that Kleinheisler had cancelled his contract with Astana, and had signed a 3.5-year contract with NK Osijek.

=== Panathinaikos ===
In January 2023 he signed for Panathinaikos. On 5 February 2023, he scored his first goal for the club in a 2–0 win over Lamia.

==== Hajduk Split (loan) ====
On 2 January 2024, he was signed by HNK Hajduk Split.

=== Grazer AK ===
On 4 February 2025, Kleinheisler signed with Grazer AK in Austrian Football Bundesliga.

== International career ==
On 6 November 2015, Bernd Storck announced the Hungarian national team squad for the UEFA Euro 2016 qualifying play-off match against Norway. The biggest surprise was the inclusion of Kleinheisler because he had not played a single match in the 2015–16 Nemzeti Bajnokság I season. Six days later, he scored on his debut against Norway at the Ullevaal Stadion in Oslo, Norway in the first leg of the UEFA Euro 2016 qualifying play-offs. He was selected for Hungary's Euro 2016 squad. He played the full 90 minutes in each of Hungary's first two matches in the group phase. In the first match, a 2–0 win against Austria, he assisted Ádám Szalai for the first goal and was voted "Man of the Match". Having received a yellow card in the second match against Iceland and with Hungary already qualified for the round of sixteen, Kleinheisler was rested in the third match. On 1 June 2021, Kleinheisler was included in the final 26-man squad to represent Hungary at the rescheduled UEFA Euro 2020 tournament. He started all three matches as Hungary finished bottom of Group F. On 14 May 2024, Kleinheisler was named in Hungary's squad for UEFA Euro 2024. He appeared as a substitute for Ádám Nagy in both the team's opening match against Switzerland and their second match against Germany.

== Personal life ==
His nickname is "Scholes", after Paul Scholes, because they are both red-haired and short-sized.

== Career statistics ==
=== Club ===
As of match played 16 May 2026

Appearances and goals by club, season and competition
| Club | Season | League | | | National cup (Note: Includes Magyar Kupa, DFB-Pokal, Croatian Cup, Greek Cup) | | League cup (Note: Includes Ligakupa) | | Europe | | Other | | Total | |
| Club | Season | Division | Apps | Goals | Apps | Goals | Apps | Goals | Apps | Goals | Apps | Goals | Apps | Goals |
|---|---|---|---|---|---|---|---|---|---|---|---|---|---|---|
| Puskás FC (loan) | 2012–13 | Nemzeti Bajnokság II | 27 | 8 | — | | — | | — | | — | | 27 | 8 |
| Videoton | 2013–14 | Nemzeti Bajnokság I | 19 | 4 | 2 | 0 | 2 | 0 | 2 (Note: Appearances in UEFA Europa League) | 0 | — | | 25 | 4 |
| Videoton | 2014–15 | Nemzeti Bajnokság I | 11 | 0 | 2 | 0 | 6 | 1 | — | | — | | 19 | 1 |
| Videoton | 2015–16 | Nemzeti Bajnokság I | 0 | 0 | 0 | 0 | — | | 0 | 0 | 0 | 0 | 19 | 1 |
| Videoton | Total | | 30 | 4 | 4 | 0 | 8 | 1 | 2 | 0 | 0 | 0 | 44 | 5 |
| Puskás Akadémia (loan) | 2014–15 | Nemzeti Bajnokság I | 12 | 0 | — | | — | | — | | — | | 12 | 0 |
| Werder Bremen | 2015–16 | Bundesliga | 6 | 0 | 1 | 0 | — | | — | | — | | 7 | 0 |
| Darmstadt 98 (loan) | 2016–17 | Bundesliga | 12 | 1 | 1 | 0 | — | | — | | — | | 13 | 1 |
| Ferencváros (loan) | 2016–17 | Nemzeti Bajnokság I | 10 | 0 | 5 | 0 | — | | — | | — | | 15 | 0 |
| Astana (loan) | 2017 | Kazakhstan Premier League | 4 | 0 | — | | — | | 6 (Note: Appearances in UEFA Champions League) | 0 | — | | 10 | 0 |
| Astana (loan) | 2018 | Kazakhstan Premier League | 16 | 0 | 0 | 0 | — | | 2 | 0 | 1 (Note: Appearance in Kazakhstan Super Cup) | 0 | 19 | 0 |
| Astana | 2018 | Kazakhstan Premier League | 12 | 0 | — | | — | | 13 (Note: Six appearances and two goals in UEFA Champions League, seven appearances in UEFA Europa League) | 2 | — | | 25 | 2 |
| Astana | Total | | 32 | 0 | 0 | 0 | — | | 21 | 2 | 1 | 0 | 54 | 2 |
| Osijek | 2018–19 | Prva HNL | 10 | 1 | 1 | 0 | — | | — | | — | | 11 | 1 |
| Osijek | 2019–20 | Prva HNL | 24 | 3 | 3 | 0 | — | | 2 | 0 | — | | 29 | 3 |
| Osijek | 2020–21 | Prva HNL | 31 | 6 | 2 | 0 | — | | 1 | 0 | — | | 34 | 6 |
| Osijek | 2021–22 | Prva HNL | 30 | 2 | 3 | 0 | — | | 4 (Note: Appearances in UEFA Conference League) | 1 | — | | 37 | 3 |
| Osijek | 2022–23 | HNL | 16 | 6 | 2 | 1 | — | | 2 | 1 | — | | 20 | 8 |
| Osijek | Total | | 111 | 18 | 11 | 1 | — | | 9 | 2 | — | | 131 | 21 |
| Panathinaikos | 2022–23 | Super League Greece | 15 | 2 | 1 | 0 | — | | — | | — | | 16 | 2 |
| Panathinaikos | 2023–24 | Super League Greece | 2 | 0 | — | | — | | 3 | 0 | — | | 5 | 0 |
| Panathinaikos | Total | | 17 | 2 | 1 | 0 | — | | 3 | 0 | — | | 21 | 2 |
| Hajduk Split (loan) | 2023–24 | HNL | 12 | 0 | 2 | 1 | — | | — | | — | | 14 | 1 |
| Grazer AK | 2024–25 | Austrian Bundesliga | 13 | 0 | — | | — | | — | | — | | 13 | 0 |
| FK Csíkszereda | 2025–26 | Liga I | 8 | 1 | 1 | 0 | — | | — | | — | | 9 | 1 |
| Career total | | | 290 | 34 | 26 | 2 | 8 | 1 | 35 | 4 | 1 | 0 | 360 | 41 |

=== International ===
As of match played on 19 June 2024.

Appearances and goals by national team and year
| National team | Year | Apps | Goals |
|---|---|---|---|
| Hungary | 2015 | 2 | 1 |
| Hungary | 2016 | 9 | 0 |
| Hungary | 2017 | 2 | 0 |
| Hungary | 2018 | 10 | 1 |
| Hungary | 2019 | 6 | 0 |
| Hungary | 2020 | 0 | 0 |
| Hungary | 2021 | 12 | 1 |
| Hungary | 2022 | 3 | 0 |
| Hungary | 2023 | 3 | 0 |
| Hungary | 2024 | 6 | 0 |
| Total | | 53 | 3 |

Scores and results list Hungary's goal tally first, score column indicates score after each Kleinheisler goal.

List of international goals scored by László Kleinheisler
| No. | Date | Venue | Opponent | Score | Result | Competition |
|---|---|---|---|---|---|---|
| 1 | 12 November 2015 | Ullevaal Stadion, Oslo, Norway | Norway | 1–0 | 1–0 | UEFA Euro 2016 qualification |
| 2 | 11 September 2018 | Groupama Arena, Budapest, Hungary | Greece | 2–1 | 2–1 | 2018–19 UEFA Nations League C |
| 3 | 31 March 2021 | Estadi Nacional, Andorra la Vella, Andorra | Andorra | 3–0 | 4–1 | 2022 FIFA World Cup qualification |

== Honours ==
Puskás FC

- Nemzeti Bajnokság II: 2012–13

Videoton

- Magyar Kupa runner-up: 2014–15
- Ligakupa runner-up: 2013–14

Ferencváros

- Magyar Kupa: 2016–17

Astana

- Kazakhstan Premier League: 2017, 2018
- Kazakhstan Super Cup: 2018
