= 2022–23 Panathinaikos F.C. season =

Panathinaikos
2022–23 season
- Chairman: Giannis Alafouzos
- Manager: Ivan Jovanović
- Stadium: Leoforos Alexandras Stadium
- Super League: 2nd (Play-offs); 1st (Regular season)
- Greek Cup: Quarter-finals
- UEFA Europa Conference League: Third qualifying round
- Top goalscorer: League: Andraz Sporar (11); All: Andraz Sporar (14)
- Biggest win: Volos 1–5 Panathinaikos
- Biggest defeat: Panathinaikos 0–3 PAOK
Home colours	Away colours	Third colours

The 2022–23 Panathinaikos season is the club's 64th consecutive season in Super League Greece. They also compete in the Greek Cup and the UEFA Europa Conference League. The season covers the period from 10 July 2022 to 13 May 2023.

== Players ==
=== Current squad ===
As of 21 September 2022

No.	Name	Nationality	Position (s)	Date of birth (age)	Signed from	Notes
Goalkeepers
12	Yuri Lodygin	(Russia)	GK	26 May 1990 (age 36)	(Greece) PAS Giannina	
15	Vasilios Xenopoulos	(Greece)	GK	20 April 1998 (age 28)	Youth system	
91	Alberto Brignoli	(Italy)	GK	19 August 1991 (age 35)	(Italy) Empoli	
Defenders
2	Georgios Vagiannidis	(Greece)	RB / RM	12 September 2001 (age 25)	(Italy) Inter Milan	
3	Juankar	(Spain)	LB / LM	30 March 1990 (age 36)	(Spain) Málaga	
5	Bart Schenkeveld	(Netherlands)	CB	28 August 1991 (age 35)	(Australia) Melbourne City	
6	Tymoteusz Puchacz	(Poland)	LB	23 January 1999 (age 27)	(Germany) Union Berlin	On loan
11	Cristian Ganea	(Romania)	LB	24 February 1992 (age 34)	(Greece) Aris	
14	Facundo Sánchez	(Argentina)	RB	7 March 1990 (age 36)	(Argentina) Estudiantes	
23	Hörður Magnússon	(Iceland)	CB	11 March 1993 (age 33)	(Russia) CSKA Moscow	
27	Giannis Kotsiras	(Greece)	RB / RM	16 December 1992 (age 33)	(Greece) Asteras Tripolis	
31	Zvonimir Šarlija	(Croatia)	CB	29 August 1996 (age 30)	(Turkey) Ankaragücü	
44	Achilleas Poungouras	(Greece)	CB	13 December 1995 (age 30)	(Greece) PAOK	
Midfielders
4	Rubén Pérez	(Spain)	DM / MF	26 April 1989 (age 37)	(Spain) Leganés	
8	László Kleinheisler	(Hungary)	AM	8 April 1994 (age 32)	(Croatia) Osijek	
10	Bernard	(Brazil)	AM / LW	8 September 1992 (age 34)	(United Arab Emirates) Sharjah	
16	Adam Gnezda Čerin	(Slovenia)	MF	16 July 1999 (age 27)	(Germany) 1. FC Nürnberg	
17	Daniel Mancini	(Argentina)	RW	11 November 1996 (age 30)	(Greece) Aris	
18	Enis Çokaj	(Albania)	DM / MF	23 February 1999 (age 27)	(Croatia) Lokomotiva	
19	Alexis Trouillet	(France)	MF	23 December 2000 (age 25)	(France) Nice	
21	Dimitrios Kourbelis	(Greece)	DM / CB	2 October 1993 (age 33)	(Greece) Asteras Tripolis	
22	Aitor Cantalapiedra	(Spain)	RW / LW	10 February 1996 (age 30)	(Netherlands) Twente	
34	Sebastián Palacios	(Argentina)	RW	20 January 1992 (age 34)	Independiente	
77	Benjamin Verbič	(Slovenia)	LW / RW	27 November 1993 (age 32)	(Ukraine) Dynamo Kyiv	
90	Leandro Frroku	(Albania)	MF	3 September 2003 (age 23)	Youth system	
Forwards
7	Fotis Ioannidis	(Greece)	CF	10 January 2000 (age 26)	(Greece) Levadiakos	
9	Andraž Šporar	(Slovenia)	CF	27 February 1994 (age 32)	(Portugal) Sporting CP	
99	Argyris Kampetsis	(Greece)	CF	6 May 1999 (age 27)	(Germany) Borussia Dortmund II	

== Transfers ==
=== Summer window ===
==== In ====
Squad #	Position	Player	Transferred From	Fee	Date	Ref
57	MF	(Portugal) António Xavier	(Portugal) Estoril	Loan return	30 June 2022	
99	FW	(Greece) Argyris Kampetsis	(Netherlands) Willem II	Loan return	30 June 2022	
12	GK	(Russia) Yuri Lodygin	(Greece) PAS Giannina	Free	1 July 2022	
11	DF	(Romania) Cristian Ganea	(Greece) Aris	Free	1 July 2022	
16	MF	(Slovenia) Adam Gnezda Čerin	(Germany) 1. FC Nürnberg	650,000 €	2 July 2022	
23	DF	(Iceland) Hörður Magnússon	(Russia) CSKA Moscow	Free	9 July 2022	
9	FW	(Slovenia) Andraž Šporar	(Portugal) Sporting CP	3,500,000 €	28 July 2022	
77	MF	(Slovenia) Benjamin Verbič	(Ukraine) Dynamo Kyiv	Free	29 July 2022	
--	MF	(Brazil) Jonas Toró	(Brazil) São Paulo	Free	4 August 2022	
10	MF	(Brazil) Bernard	(United Arab Emirates) Sharjah	Free	23 August 2022	
19	MF	(France) Alexis Trouillet	(France) Nice	Undisclosed	15 September 2022	
18	MF	(Albania) Enis Çokaj	(Croatia) Lokomotiva	1,000,000 €	15 September 2022	

==== Out ====
Squad #	Position	Player	Transferred To	Fee	Date	Ref
50	MF	(Serbia) Mijat Gaćinović	(Germany) 1899 Hoffenheim	End of loan	30 June 2022	
98	MF	(Brazil) Mateus Vital	(Brazil) Corinthians	End of loan	30 June 2022	
16	MF	(Sweden) Ramon Pascal Lundqvist	(Netherlands) Groningen	End of loan	30 June 2022	
11	MF	(Greece) Anastasios Chatzigiovanis	(Turkey) Ankaragücü	End of contract	30 June 2022	
19	MF	(Argentina) Lucas Villafáñez	(Cyprus) APOEL	End of contract	30 June 2022	
57	MF	(Denmark) Uffe Bech	Free agent	End of contract	30 June 2022	
88	MF	(Brazil) Maurício	(Russia) Rodina Moscow	End of contract	30 June 2022	
12	DF	(Greece) Ilias Chatzitheodoridis	(Greece) Panetolikos	Free	1 July 2022	
4	DF	(Spain) Fran Vélez	(Saudi Arabia) Al Fateh	850,000 €	4 July 2022	
9	FW	(Italy) Federico Macheda	(Turkey) Ankaragücü	Undisclosed	11 July 2022	
8	MF	(Morocco) Yassin Ayoub	(Netherlands) Excelsior	Free	22 July 2022	
10	FW	(Spain) Carlitos	(Poland) Legia Warsaw	400,000 €	16 August 2022	
6	MF	(Greece) Sotiris Alexandropoulos	(Portugal) Sporting CP	4,500,000 €	29 August 2022	
--	MF	(Brazil) Jonas Toró	(Greece) Levadiakos	Loan	7 September 2022	

=== Winter window ===
==== In ====
Squad #	Position	Player	Transferred From	Fee	Date	Ref
6	DF	(Poland) Tymoteusz Puchacz	(Germany) Union Berlin	Loan	1 January 2023	
8	MF	(Hungary) László Kleinheisler	(Croatia) Osijek	500,000 €	12 January 2023	
--	FW	(Sweden) Alexander Jeremejeff	(Sweden) BK Häcken	270,000 €	20 January 2023	
17	MF	(Argentina) Daniel Mancini	(Greece) Aris	3,000,000 €	26 January 2023	

==== Out ====
Squad #	Position	Player	Transferred To	Fee	Date	Ref
--	FW	(Sweden) Alexander Jeremejeff	(Greece) Levadiakos	Loan	20 January 2023	
1	GK	(Greece) Sokratis Dioudis	(Poland) Zagłębie Lubin	Free	27 January 2023	
57	MF	(Portugal) António Xavier	(Greece) Levadiakos	Loan	31 January 2023	

== Pre-season and friendlies ==
7 July 2022 Friendly	Kitzbühel	Canceled	Panathinaikos	Kitzbühel, Austria
19:00		Report		Stadium: Sportplatz Kitzbühel-Langau

10 July 2022 Friendly	Watford	0–0	Panathinaikos	Kössen, Austria
14:30		Report		Stadium: Kaiserwinkl Arena

14 July 2022 Friendly	Al-Duhail	0–1	Panathinaikos	Wörgl, Austria
19:00		Report	44' (pen.) Aitor	Stadium: Alois Latini Stadium

17 July 2022 Friendly	Bayer Leverkusen	0–0	Panathinaikos	Zell am See, Austria
17:00		Report		Stadium: Alois Latini Stadium

24 July 2022 Friendly	Panathinaikos	0–0	Volos	Athens, Greece
19:30		Report		Stadium: Leoforos Alexandras Stadium; Referee: Anastasios Papapetrou

28 July 2022 Friendly	Panathinaikos	2–1	FC Volendam	Athens, Greece
20:30	Kourbelis 34'; Carlitos 76'	Report	58' El Kadiri	Stadium: Leoforos Alexandras Stadium; Referee: Angelos Evangelou

1 December 2022 Friendly	Panathinaikos	3–1	Hapoel Be'er Sheva	Pegeia, Cyprus
12:00	Xavier 40'; Sideras 72'; Poungouras 82'	Report	27' Selmani	Stadium: Peyia Municipal Stadium

4 December 2022 Friendly	Pafos	2–2	Panathinaikos	Paphos, Cyprus
18:00	Valakari 39'; Betancor 45'	Report	77' (pen.) Verbič; 79' Kryparakos	Stadium: Stelios Kyriakides Stadium

7 December 2022 Friendly	Nea Salamina	0–1	Panathinaikos	Larnaca, Cyprus
18:30		Report	29' Šporar	Stadium: Ammochostos Stadium

== Competitions ==
=== Super League Greece ===
==== League table ====
Pos	Team	Pld	W	D	L	GF	GA	GD	Pts	Qualification or relegation
1	Panathinaikos	26	19	4	3	38	12	+26	61	Qualification for the Play-off round
2	AEK Athens	26	19	2	5	51	14	+37	59	Qualification for the Play-off round
3	Olympiacos	26	16	8	2	53	14	+39	56	Qualification for the Play-off round
4	PAOK	26	15	9	2	43	15	+28	54	Qualification for the Play-off round
5	Aris	26	12	4	10	38	24	+14	40	Qualification for the Play-off round

Source: Super League Greece
Rules for classification: 1) Points; 2) Head-to-head points; 3) Head-to-head goal difference; 4) Goal difference; 5) Goals scored; 6) Play-offs (neutral ground).
(Note: Criterion 6 is only used if needed to decide champion, teams for relegation or teams for UEFA competitions).

==== Regular season ====
21 August 2022 1	Panathinaikos	1–0	Ionikos	Athens, Greece
20:00	Aitor 45+3' (pen.)	Report		Stadium: Leoforos Alexandras Stadium; Attendance: 8,518; Referee: Anastasios Sidiropoulos

28 August 2022 2	OFI	0–2	Panathinaikos	Heraklion, Greece
21:00		Report	16' Palacios; 34' Šporar	Stadium: Theodoros Vardinogiannis Stadium; Attendance: 5,079; Referee: Vasilios Fotias

3 September 2022 3	Panathinaikos	1–0	Levadiakos	Athens, Greece
20:30	Verbič 3'	Report		Stadium: Leoforos Alexandras Stadium; Attendance: 10,123; Referee: Petros Tsagarakis

11 September 2022 4	Panathinaikos	2–1	AEK Athens	Athens, Greece
21:30	Aitor 43' (pen.); Šporar 45+7' (pen.)	Report	36' Pineda	Stadium: Leoforos Alexandras Stadium; Attendance: 13,943; Referee: Georgi Kabakov

17 September 2022 5	Panathinaikos	3–0	PAS Giannina	Athens, Greece
21:30	Aitor 44', 54', 70'	Report		Stadium: Leoforos Alexandras Stadium; Attendance: 11,040; Referee: Aristomenis Koutsiaftis

2 October 2022 6	PAOK	1–2	Panathinaikos	Thessaloniki, Greece
21:30	Oliveira 18'	Report	51', 73' (pen.) Aitor	Stadium: Toumba Stadium; Attendance: 21,074; Referee: Julian Weinberger

9 October 2022 7	Panathinaikos	1–0	Asteras Tripolis	Athens, Greece
19:30	Aitor 80' (pen.)	Report		Stadium: Leoforos Alexandras Stadium; Attendance: 13,930; Referee: Ioannis Papadopoulos

16 October 2022 8	Lamia	0–2	Panathinaikos	Lamia, Greece
19:30		Report	23' Palacios; 73' Sánchez	Stadium: Lamia Municipal Stadium; Attendance: 2,584; Referee: Vasilios Fotias

23 October 2022 9	Panathinaikos	1–0	Aris	Athens, Greece
19:30	Šporar 90+2'	Report		Stadium: Leoforos Alexandras Stadium; Attendance: 12,917; Referee: Nikola Dabanović

29 October 2022 10	Volos	1–5	Panathinaikos	Volos, Greece
19:30	Knockaert 84' (pen.)	Report	39', 44' Palacios; 63' Juankar; 67' Čerin; 76' Šporar	Stadium: Panthessaliko Stadium; Attendance: 14,882; Referee: Anastasios Sidiropoulos

6 November 2022 11	Panathinaikos	1–1	Olympiacos	Athens, Greece
19:30	Šporar 90+13' (pen.)	Report	84' Biel	Stadium: Leoforos Alexandras Stadium; Attendance: 13,907; Referee: Jakob Kehlet

9 November 2022 12	Panetolikos	0–1	Panathinaikos	Agrinio, Greece
17:00		Report	78' Ioannidis	Stadium: Panetolikos Stadium; Attendance: 3,391; Referee: Christos Vergetis

13 November 2022 13	Panathinaikos	2–0	Atromitos	Athens, Greece
17:15	Ioannidis 80'; Magnússon 90+4'	Report		Stadium: Leoforos Alexandras Stadium; Attendance: 13,163; Referee: Evangelos Manouchos

21 December 2022 14	Ionikos	1–1	Panathinaikos	Nikaia, Piraeus, Greece
17:30	Aosman 84'	Report	14' Bernard	Stadium: Neapoli Stadium; Attendance: 1,094; Referee: Ioannis Papadopoulos

28 December 2022 15	Panathinaikos	1–1	OFI	Athens, Greece
21:30	Ioannidis 90+4'	Report	59' Larsson	Stadium: Leoforos Alexandras Stadium; Attendance: 11,713; Referee: Efstathios Gkortsilas

3 January 2023 16	Levadiakos	0–1	Panathinaikos	Levadia, Greece
17:00		Report	35' Verbič	Stadium: Levadia Municipal Stadium; Attendance: 4,283; Referee: Alexandros Tsakalidis

8 January 2023 17	AEK Athens	1–0	Panathinaikos	Athens, Greece
19:30	Pineda 68'	Report		Stadium: Agia Sophia Stadium; Attendance: 31,100; Referee: António Nobre

15 January 2023 18	PAS Giannina	0–1	Panathinaikos	Ioannina, Greece
20:30		Report	90+5' Šporar	Stadium: Zosimades Stadium; Referee: Petros Tsagarakis

22 January 2023 19	Panathinaikos	0–3	PAOK	Athens, Greece
19:30		Report	44' (o.g.) Rubén; 46' Živković; 52' Konstantelias	Stadium: Leoforos Alexandras Stadium; Attendance: 13,612; Referee: Aleksei Kulbakov

29 January 2023 20	Asteras Tripolis	1–0	Panathinaikos	Tripoli, Greece
20:30	Bartolo 80'	Report		Stadium: Theodoros Kolokotronis Stadium; Attendance: 1,244; Referee: Athanasios Tzilos

5 February 2023 21	Panathinaikos	2–0	Lamia	Athens, Greece
17:00	Kleinheisler 14'; Šporar 90+2'	Report		Stadium: Leoforos Alexandras Stadium; Attendance: 6,350; Referee: Dimitrios Karantonis

12 February 2023 22	Aris	1–2	Panathinaikos	Thessaloniki, Greece
20:00	Odubajo 10'	Report	36' Mancini; 86' Palacios	Stadium: Kleanthis Vikelidis Stadium; Attendance: 7,291; Referee: Mads-Kristoffer Kristoffersen

18 February 2023 23	Panathinaikos	2–0	Volos	Athens, Greece
17:00	Kourbelis 59'; Šporar 69' (pen.)	Report		Stadium: Leoforos Alexandras Stadium; Attendance: 12,360; Referee: Vasilios Fotias

25 February 2023 24	Olympiacos	0–0	Panathinaikos	Piraeus, Greece
20:30		Report		Stadium: Karaiskakis Stadium; Attendance: 31,487; Referee: João Pinheiro

6 March 2023 25	Panathinaikos	2–0	Panetolikos	Athens, Greece
19:30	Mancini 62'; Palacios 84'	Report		Stadium: Leoforos Alexandras Stadium; Attendance: 11,506; Referee: Ioannis Papadopoulos

12 March 2023 26	Atromitos	0–2	Panathinaikos	Athens, Greece
19:00		Report	49', 63' (pen.) Ioannidis	Stadium: Peristeri Stadium; Attendance: 1,739; Referee: Angelos Evangelou

==== Play-off round ====
Pos	Team	Pld	W	D	L	GF	GA	GD	Pts	Qualification
1	AEK Athens (C)	36	26	5	5	69	17	+52	83	Qualification for the Champions League third qualifying round
2	Panathinaikos	36	23	9	4	47	16	+31	78	Qualification for the Champions League second qualifying round
3	Olympiacos	36	21	10	5	70	24	+46	73	Qualification for the Europa League third qualifying round
4	PAOK	36	19	10	7	57	32	+25	67	Qualification for the Europa Conference League second qualifying round
5	Aris	36	15	6	15	55	41	+14	51	Qualification for the Europa Conference League second qualifying round
6	Volos	36	11	7	18	35	66	−31	40	

Source: Super League Greece
Rules for classification: 1) Points; 2) Head-to-head points (Regular season and play-off); 3) Head-to-head goal difference (Regular season and play-off); 4) Regular season position.
(C) Champions

19 March 2023 1	AEK Athens	0–0	Panathinaikos	Athens, Greece
21:30		Report		Stadium: Agia Sophia Stadium; Attendance: 31,100; Referee: Nikola Dabanović

2 April 2023 2	Panathinaikos	0–0	Volos	Athens, Greece
18:00		Report		Stadium: Leoforos Alexandras Stadium; Attendance: 13,124; Referee: Evangelos Manouchos

5 April 2023 3	Aris	0–1	Panathinaikos	Thessaloniki, Greece
19:30		Report	69' Šporar	Stadium: Kleanthis Vikelidis Stadium; Attendance: 7,010; Referee: Tamás Bognár

9 April 2023 4	Panathinaikos	2–0	Olympiacos	Athens, Greece
21:00	Šporar 28'; El-Arabi 36' (o.g.)	Report		Stadium: Leoforos Alexandras Stadium; Attendance: 14,182; Referee: Carlos del Cerro Grande

22 April 2023 5	PAOK	1–2	Panathinaikos	Thessaloniki, Greece
20:00	Augusto 85'	Report	38' Bernard; 90+1' (pen.) Ioannidis	Stadium: Toumba Stadium; Attendance: 12,880; Referee: Daniel Siebert

26 April 2023 6	Volos	0–2	Panathinaikos	Volos, Greece
18:00		Report	46' Ioannidis; 65' Šporar	Stadium: Panthessaliko Stadium; Attendance: 9,586; Referee: Anastasios Sidiropoulos

30 April 2023 7	Panathinaikos	0–0	AEK Athens	Athens, Greece
20:00		Report		Stadium: Leoforos Alexandras Stadium; Attendance: 13,373; Referee: Artur Soares Dias

3 May 2023 8	Panathinaikos	1–1	PAOK	Athens, Greece
20:00	Mancini 9'	Report	60' Brandon	Stadium: Leoforos Alexandras Stadium; Attendance: 13,491; Referee: Craig Pawson

8 May 2023 9	Olympiacos	1–0	Panathinaikos	Piraeus, Greece
21:00	Reabciuk 68'	Report		Stadium: Karaiskakis Stadium; Attendance: 0 Referee: Felix Brych

14 May 2023 10	Panathinaikos	1–1	Aris	Athens, Greece
20:00	Kleinheisler 6'	Report	29' Iturbe	Stadium: Leoforos Alexandras Stadium; Attendance: 12,710; Referee: Athanasios Tzilos

=== Greek Cup ===
==== Round of 16 ====
15 December 2022 First leg	Panathinaikos	3–0	Volos	Ampelokipoi
17:30 EET	Šporar 45+6'; Čerin 54'; Verbič 59'	Report		Stadium: Leoforos Alexandras Stadium; Referee: Aristotelis Diamantopoulos (Arcadia)

11 January 2023 Second leg	Volos	0–2	Panathinaikos	Volos
16:30 EET		Report	Čerin 40'; Šporar 80'	Stadium: Panthessaliko Stadium; Referee: Angelos Angelakis (Macedonia)

==== Quarter-finals ====
18 January 2023 First leg	PAOK	2–0	Panathinaikos	Thessaloniki
20:30 EET	Brandon 52'; Taison 72'	Report		Stadium: Toumba Stadium; Referee: Slavko Vinčić (Slovenia)

26 January 2023 Second leg	Panathinaikos	1–1	PAOK	Ampelokipoi
19:30 EET	Čerin 18'	Report	Oliveira 78' (pen.)	Stadium: Leoforos Alexandras Stadium; Referee: Petri Viljanen (Finland)

=== UEFA Europa Conference League ===
==== Third qualifying round ====
4 August 2022 First leg	Slavia Prague (Czech Republic)	2–0	(Greece) Panathinaikos	Prague, Czech Republic
19:00	Schranz 45+2'; Usor 56'	Report		Stadium: Fortuna Arena; Attendance: 17,314; Referee: Ruddy Buquet

11 August 2022 Second leg	Panathinaikos (Greece)	1–1 (1–3 agg.)	(Czech Republic) Slavia Prague	Athens, Greece
20:30	Šporar 58'	Report	90+5' Jurečka	Stadium: Leoforos Alexandras Stadium; Attendance: 13,123; Referee: Peter Bankes
