= 2016 Puskás Cup =

Football tournament in Hungary

Puskás Suzuki Cup

Tournament details
- Host country: Hungary
- Dates: 13 May – 16 May
- Teams: 6 (from 1 confederation)
- Venue: 1 (in 1 host city)

Final positions
- Champions: (Hungary) Budapest Honvéd FC (5th title)
- Runners-up: (Hungary) Puskás Akadémia FC

Tournament statistics
- Matches played: 9
- Goals scored: 30 (3.33 per match)
- Top scorer: (Hungary) Zsombor Bévárdi (Puskás Akadémia FC)

The 2016 Puskás Cup was the ninth edition of the Puskás Cup and took place between 13 May to 16 May in Felcsút, Hungary. Budapest Honvéd were the defending champions. One new team, Genk Jeugd, were invited by the organisers for this event.

The 2016 Puskás Cup was won by Budapest Honvéd by beating Puskás Akadémia in penalty shootout in the final on 16 May 2016 at the Pancho Arena in Felcsút. La Fábrica finished third by beating Genk Jeugd 3-1. Hagi Academy finished fifth by beating Panathinaikos 2-1.

== Participating teams ==
- (Hungary) Budapest Honvéd (former club of Ferenc Puskás)
- (Spain) La Fábrica (former club of Ferenc Puskás)
- (Romania) Hagi Academy (invited)
- (Belgium) Genk Jeugd (invited)
- (Greece) Panathinaikos (former club of Ferenc Puskás)
- (Hungary) Puskás Akadémia (host)

== Venues ==
Felcsút
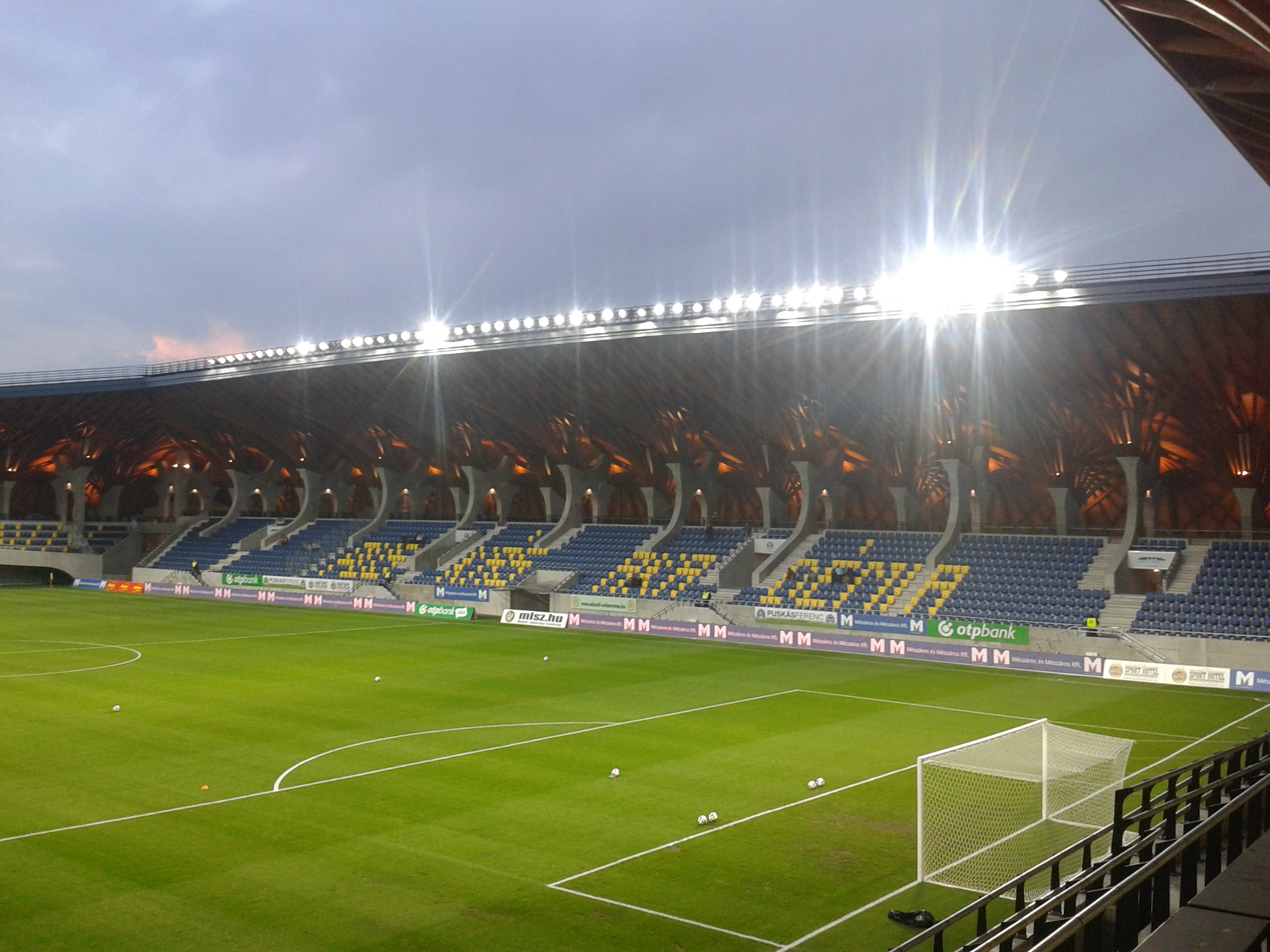
Pancho Arena
47°27′50″N 18°35′12″E
Capacity: 3,500

== Squads ==
=== Budapest Honvéd ===
Coach: Krisztián Somogyi

Note: Flags indicate national team as defined under FIFA eligibility rules; some limited exceptions apply. Players may hold more than one non-FIFA nationality.

No.	Pos.	Nation	Player
—	GK	HUN	Attila Berla
—	GK	HUN	Áron Pálfi
—	DF	HUN	Botond Erdélyi
—	DF	HUN	Bálint Falusy
—	DF	HUN	Márkó Gajda
—	DF	HUN	Bence Csanád Horváth
—	DF	HUN	Alex Pratsler
—	MF	HUN	Bence Banó-Szabó
—	MF	HUN	Attila Cziffra
—	MF	HUN	Gergő Cseh
—	MF	HUN	Roland Farkas
—	MF	HUN	Milán Májer
—	MF	HUN	Gergő Nagy
—	MF	HUN	Tibor Dávid Stoiacovici
—	FW	HUN	Nikolasz Kovács
—	FW	HUN	Norbert Kundrák
—	FW	HUN	Viktor Árpád Németh
—	FW	HUN	Richárd Novák
—	FW	HUN	Benjámin Pratsler
—	FW	HUN	Szabolcs Schön
—	MF	HUN	Nagy Kristóf Attila

=== La Fábrica ===
Coach: Tristán David Celador

Note: Flags indicate national team as defined under FIFA eligibility rules; some limited exceptions apply. Players may hold more than one non-FIFA nationality.

No.	Pos.	Nation	Player
—	GK	ESP	Francisco Daniel Martínez Pujante
—	GK	ESP	Adrián Rodriguez Jimenez
—	DF	ESP	Adrián de la Fuente Barquilla
—	DF	ESP	Mario Rafael Del Campo Escobar
—	DF	ESP	Jordi Jair Govea Merlín
—	DF	ESP	Etienne Paolo Medina
—	DF	ESP	Gómez Guillermo Torres
—	DF	ESP	Alejandro Zerki Carrero
—	MF	ESP	Elliot Gómez López
—	MF	ESP	Román Adrián Moreno
—	MF	ESP	José Javier Robles Belmonte
—	MF	ESP	Joaquin Rodriguez Martinez
—	MF	ESP	Christian
—	MF	ESP	Raúl Tavares Pulido
—	FW	ESP	Antonio Manuel Casas Marin
—	FW	ESP	Rodriguez Inaki Elejalde
—	FW	ESP	Garcia Alberto Fernandez
—	FW	ESP	Sergio Sanchez Gioya
—	FW	ESP	Francisco Joaquin Santos Sanchez

=== Genk Jeugd ===
Coach: Eddy Vanhemel

Note: Flags indicate national team as defined under FIFA eligibility rules; some limited exceptions apply. Players may hold more than one non-FIFA nationality.

No.	Pos.	Nation	Player
—	GK	BEL	Marten Schevenels
—	GK	BEL	Olivier Marc Vliegen
—	DF	BEL	Shawn Femi Adewoye
—	DF	BEL	Hendrikus Flapper Fons
—	DF	BEL	Maxim Goossens
—	DF	BEL	Amine Khammas
—	DF	BEL	Jill Lathouwers Siebren
—	DF	BEL	Joren Leyssens
—	DF	BEL	Ian Opdenakker
—	DF	BEL	Chris N Vandecaetsbeek Falke
—	MF	BEL	Safouane Ahidar
—	MF	BEL	Hassan Warsama Houssein
—	MF	BEL	Xander Lambrix
—	MF	BEL	Ismael Ngedi Lukoki
—	FW	BEL	Adriano Bertaccini
—	FW	BEL	Emeraude Molembia Bolingoli
—	FW	BEL	Rabbi Daudet Djongambo Dihumba
—	FW	BEL	Rashaan Fernandes
—	FW	BEL	Jonathan Alejandro Figueroa Lopez
—	FW	BEL	Elvis Mehanovic

=== Hagi Academy ===
Coach: Nicolae Rosca

Note: Flags indicate national team as defined under FIFA eligibility rules; some limited exceptions apply. Players may hold more than one non-FIFA nationality.

No.	Pos.	Nation	Player
—	GK	ROU	Ion Cristian Gurau
—	GK	ROU	Rares Murariu
—	DF	ROU	George Acasandrei
—	DF	ROU	Madalin Androne
—	DF	ROU	Tudor Baluta
—	DF	ROU	Robert Neciu
—	DF	ROU	Alexandru Sabangeanu
—	DF	ROU	Nicholas Suflaru
—	MF	ROU	Radu Boboc
—	MF	ROU	Ionut Cringanu
—	MF	ROU	Mihai Ene
—	MF	ROU	Catalin Itu
—	MF	ROU	Alexandru Tranca
—	MF	ROU	Raul Vidrasan
—	FW	ROU	Romeo Branica
—	FW	ROU	Denis Dragus
—	FW	ROU	Alexandru Mățan
—	FW	ROU	Cosmin Tucaliuc

=== Panathinaikos ===
Coach: Henk Herder

Note: Flags indicate national team as defined under FIFA eligibility rules; some limited exceptions apply. Players may hold more than one non-FIFA nationality.

No.	Pos.	Nation	Player
—	GK	GRE	Nikolaos Christogeorgos
—	GK	GRE	Konrad Dawid Partyka
—	DF	GRE	Igli Doko
—	DF	GRE	Anastasios Gkountounas
—	DF	GRE	Epameinondas Manidakis
—	DF	GRE	Sotirios Margaronis
—	DF	GRE	Georgios Nikologiannis
—	DF	GRE	Christos Zervopoulos
—	MF	GRE	Konstantinos Apostolakis
—	MF	GRE	Antzelo Giaoupi
—	MF	GRE	Leonidas Kalomoiris
—	MF	GRE	Georgios Manidakis
—	MF	GRE	Antriano Skenterai
—	MF	GRE	Konstantinos Spinos
—	MF	GRE	Evangelos Xepapadakis
—	MF	GRE	Konstantinos Varesis
—	FW	GRE	Kristis Abilas
—	FW	GRE	Athanasios Dimitroulas
—	FW	GRE	Panagiotis Lolos
—	FW	GRE	Kristo Shehu

=== Puskás Akadémia ===
Coach: Ivica Kulesevic

Note: Flags indicate national team as defined under FIFA eligibility rules; some limited exceptions apply. Players may hold more than one non-FIFA nationality.

No.	Pos.	Nation	Player
—	GK	HUN	Ádám Erdélyi
—	GK	HUN	Ádám Varga
—	DF	HUN	László Deutsch
—	DF	HUN	Olivér Győri
—	DF	HUN	Dániel Radó
—	DF	HUN	Bence Lovász
—	DF	HUN	Tamás Megyesi
—	DF	HUN	Kristóf Papp
—	DF	HUN	Gergely Sziklási
—	DF	HUN	Roland Tarnóczi
—	MF	HUN	Bendegúz Burka
—	MF	HUN	Zoltán Daróczi
—	MF	HUN	Martin Gyura
—	MF	HUN	Benjámin Lefler
—	MF	HUN	Gergely Mim
—	MF	HUN	Balázs Varga
—	FW	HUN	Zsombor Bévárdi
—	FW	HUN	Dániel Gergye
—	FW	HUN	Dániel Oroszi
—	FW	HUN	Máté Szabó

== Results ==
All times are local (UTC+2).

=== Group A ===
Team	Pld	W	D	L	GF	GA	GD	Pts
(Hungary) Puskás Akadémia	2	2	0	0	5	2	+3	6
(Belgium) Genk Jeugd	2	1	0	1	5	4	+1	3
(Greece) Panathinaikos	2	0	0	2	0	4	-4	0

Team qualified for the Final
Team qualified for the Third place play-off
13 May 2016
11:00

(Hungary) Puskás Akadémia	4–2	(Belgium) Genk Jeugd
Bévárdi 12' 33' 39'; Mim 49'	Report	Ahidar 1'; Bertaccini 55'

Pancho Arena, Felcsút
Referee: Ádám Németh

14 May 2016
11:00

(Hungary) Puskás Akadémia	1–0	(Greece) Panathinaikos
Varga B. 57'	Report

Pancho Arena, Felcsút
Referee: József Erdős

15 May 2016
11:00

(Belgium) Genk Jeugd	3–0	(Greece) Panathinaikos
Bolingoli 9'; Bonney 21'; Ahidar 46'	Report

Pancho Arena, Felcsút
Referee: Zoltán J. Kovács

=== Group B ===
Team	Pld	W	D	L	GF	GA	GD	Pts
(Hungary) Budapest Honvéd	2	1	1	0	4	2	+2	4
(Spain) La Fábrica	2	1	0	1	4	4	0	3
(Romania) Hagi Academy	2	0	1	1	4	6	-2	1

Team qualified for the Final
Team qualified for the Third place play-off
13 May 2016
13:00

(Hungary) Budapest Honvéd	2–0	(Spain) La Fábrica
Pratsler B. 15'; Kovács N. 82'	Report

Pancho Arena, Felcsút
Referee: Szabolcs Szilasi

14 May 2016
13:00

(Hungary) Budapest Honvéd	2–2	(Romania) Hagi Academy
Banó-Szabó 60'; Májer 82'	Report	Dragus 24'; Banica 79'

Pancho Arena, Felcsút
Referee: Péter Solymosi

15 May 2016
13:00

(Spain) La Fábrica	4–2	(Romania) Hagi Academy
Marin 3'; Román 30' 82'; García 38'	Report	Itu 52'; Neciu 85'

Pancho Arena, Felcsút
Referee: Gergely Szőts

=== Fifth place play-off ===
16 May 2016
12:00

(Greece) Panathinaikos	1–2	(Romania) Hagi Academy
Doko 62'	Report	Matan 23' 58'

Pancho Arena, Felcsút
Referee: Tibor Gyarmati

=== Third place play-off ===
16 May 2016
14:00

(Belgium) Genk Jeugd	0–3	(Spain) La Fábrica
	Report	E. Rodriguez 11'; Barquilla 37'; López 82'

Pancho Arena, Felcsút
Referee: Ádám Németh

=== Final ===
16 May 2016
16:00

(Hungary) Puskás Akadémia	1–1 (p 5-6)	(Hungary) Budapest Honvéd
Bévárdi 66'	Report	Pratsler B. 64'

Pancho Arena, Felcsút
Referee: Sándor Andó-Szabó

== Statistics ==
=== Goalscorers ===
4 goals

- (Hungary) Zsombor Bévárdi (Puskás Akadémia)

2 goals

- (Belgium) Safouane Ahidar (Genk Jeugd)
- (Hungary) Benjámin Pratsler (Budapest Honvéd)
- (Spain) Román Adrián Moreno (La Fábrica)

1 goal

- (Hungary) Zoltán Bence Banó-Szabó (Budapest Honvéd)
- (Hungary) Nikolasz Kovács (Budapest Honvéd)
- (Hungary) Milán Májer (Budapest Honvéd)
- (Spain) Antonio Manuel Casas Marin (La Fábrica)
- (Spain) Garcia Alberto Fernandez (La Fábrica)
- (Spain) Rodriguez Inaki Elejalde (La Fábrica)
- (Spain) Adrián de la Fuente Barquilla (La Fábrica)
- (Spain) Elliot Gómez López (La Fábrica)
- (Belgium) Adriano Bertaccini (Genk Jeugd)
- (Belgium) Emeraude Molembia Bolingoli (Genk Jeugd)
- (Romania) Denis Dragus (Hagi Academy)
- (Romania) Romeo Branica (Hagi Academy)
- (Romania) Catalin Itu (Hagi Academy)
- (Romania) Robert Neciu (Hagi Academy)
- (Romania) Alexandru Mățan (Hagi Academy)
- (Greece) Igli Doko (Panathinaikos)
- (Hungary) Gergely Mim (Puskás Akadémia)
- (Hungary) Balázs Varga (Puskás Akadémia)
