= 2017 Puskás Cup =

Puskás Suzuki Cup

Tournament details
- Host country: Hungary
- Dates: 2 June – 5 June
- Teams: 6 (from 1 confederation)
- Venue: 1 (in 1 host city)

Final positions
- Champions: Real Madrid (4th title)
- Runners-up: Panathinaikos

Tournament statistics
- Matches played: 9
- Goals scored: 23 (2.56 per match)
- Top scorer: (Hungary) László Kecskeméti (3)
- Best player: (Hungary) Ásványi Balázs

The 2017 Puskás Cup was the tenth edition of the Puskás Cup, an invitational under-17 association football tournament, that took place from 2 June to 5 June in Felcsút, Hungary. Budapest Honvéd were the defending champions. The tournament was organized by Puskás Akadémia and all matches were once again played at the team's home stadium, Pancho Arena.

== Participating teams ==
- (Germany) Bayern Munich
- (Hungary) Budapest Honvéd
- (Greece) Panathinaikos
- (Spain) Real Madrid
- (Hungary) Puskás Akadémia (host)
- (Portugal) Sporting CP

== Venues ==
Felcsút
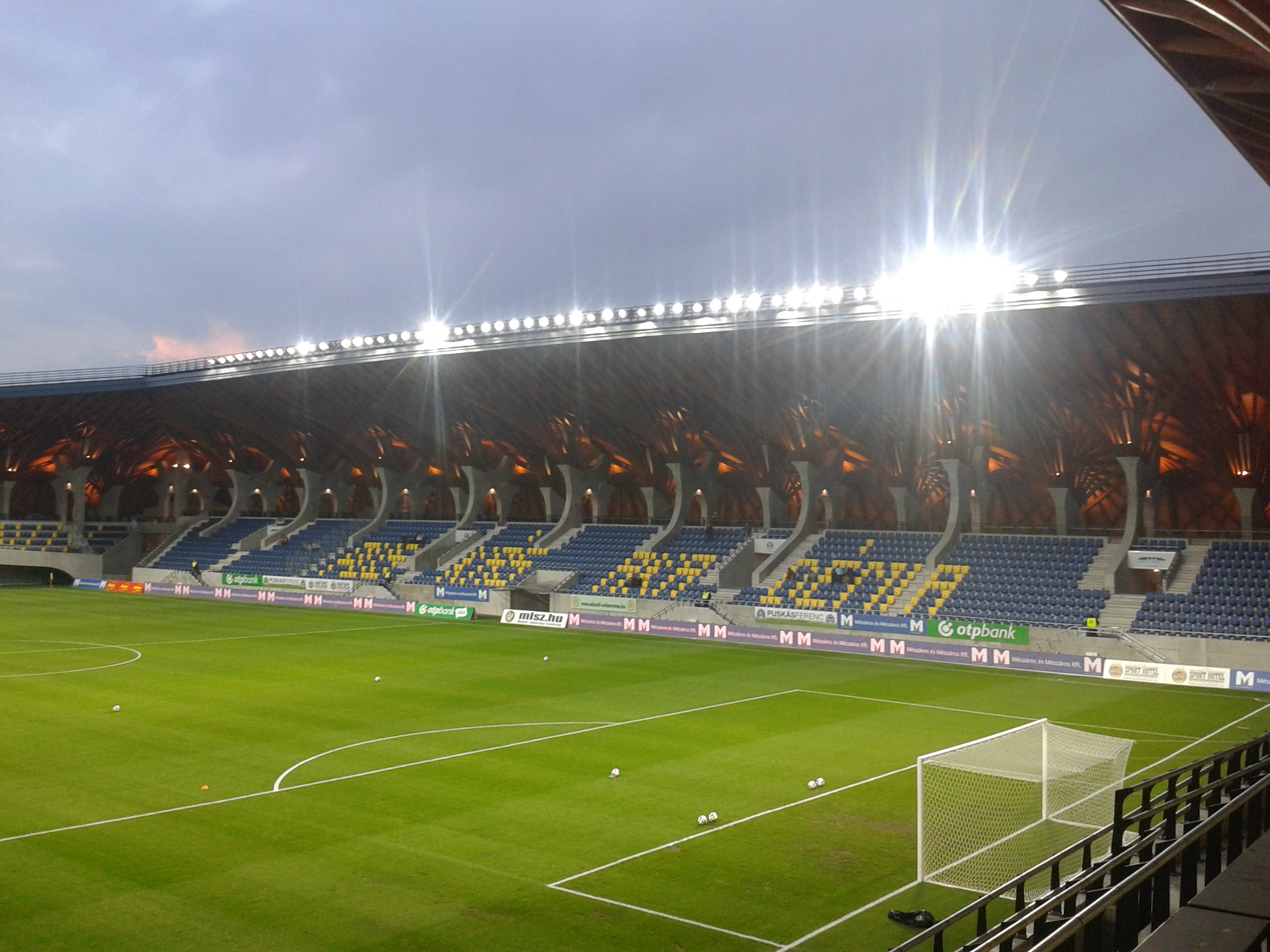
Pancho Arena
47°27′50″N 18°35′12″E
Capacity: 3,500

== Results ==
=== Group A ===
| Team | Pld | W | D | L | GF | GA | GD | Pts |
|---|---|---|---|---|---|---|---|---|
| (Greece) Panathinaikos | 2 | 2 | 0 | 0 | 4 | 0 | +4 | 6 |
| (Hungary) Puskás Akadémia | 2 | 1 | 0 | 1 | 1 | 1 | 0 | 3 |
| (Germany) Bayern Munich | 2 | 0 | 0 | 2 | 0 | 4 | -4 | 0 |

2 June 2017
17:00

| (Hungary) Puskás Akadémia | 1–0 | (Germany) Bayern Munich |
|---|---|---|
| Norman Timári 79' | Report |

Pancho Arena, Felcsút
Referee: Karakó

3 June 2017
17:00

| (Hungary) Puskás Akadémia | 0–1 | (Greece) Panathinaikos |
|---|---|---|
| | Report | Christodoulou 76' |

Pancho Arena, Felcsút
Referee: Farkas

4 June 2017
15:00

| (Germany) Bayern Munich | 0–3 | (Greece) Panathinaikos |
|---|---|---|
| | Report | Adriano Skenterai 40'; Emanoulidis 54', 75' |

Pancho Arena, Felcsút
Referee: Bereke
Team qualified for the Final
Team qualified for the Third place play-off

=== Group B ===
| Team | Pld | W | D | L | GF | GA | GD | Pts |
|---|---|---|---|---|---|---|---|---|
| (Spain) Real Madrid | 2 | 2 | 0 | 0 | 3 | 1 | +2 | 6 |
| (Hungary) Budapest Honvéd | 2 | 1 | 0 | 1 | 4 | 5 | -1 | 3 |
| (Portugal) Sporting CP | 2 | 0 | 0 | 2 | 3 | 4 | -1 | 0 |

2 June 2017
15:00

| (Hungary) Budapest Honvéd | 3–3 (p 2–1) | (Portugal) Sporting CP |
|---|---|---|
| Norbert Szendrei 5'; László Kecskeméti 7', 54' | Report | ill. Inácio 28'; Rui Reis 72'; Filipe Sissé 79' |

Pancho Arena, Felcsút
Referee: Szőts

3 June 2017
15:00

| (Hungary) Budapest Honvéd | 1–2 | (Spain) Real Madrid |
|---|---|---|
| László Kecskeméti 21' | Report | Park 41'; Del Álamo 78' |

Pancho Arena, Felcsút
Referee: Ádam Németh

4 June 2017
17:00

| (Portugal) Sporting CP | 0–1 | (Spain) Real Madrid |
|---|---|---|
| | Report | Khallak 27' |

Pancho Arena, Felcsút
Referee: Iványi
Team qualified for the Final
Team qualified for the Third place play-off

=== Fifth place play-off ===
5 June 2017
13:00

| (Portugal) Sporting CP | 2–0 | (Germany) Bayern Munich |
|---|---|---|
| Silva 16'; Cardoso 65' | Report |

Pancho Arena, Felcsút

=== Third place play-off ===
5 June 2017
15:00

| (Hungary) Puskás Akadémia | 1–1 (p 7–6) | (Hungary) Budapest Honvéd |
|---|---|---|
| Áron Csibi 39' (o.g.) | Report | Nándor Tamás 57' |

Pancho Arena, Felcsút
Referee: Solymosi

=== Final ===
5 June 2017
17:00

| (Greece) Panathinaikos | 0–4 | (Spain) Real Madrid |
|---|---|---|
| | Report | Vallo 29'; Nieto 41'; Marin 70'; Belmonte 78' |

Pancho Arena, Felcsút
Referee: Bognár

== Statistics ==
=== Goalscorers ===
3 goals

- (Hungary) László Kecskeméti (Budapest Honvéd)

2 goals

- (Greece) Emanoulidis (Panathinaikos)

1 goal

- (Spain) Belmonte (Real Madrid)
- (Portugal) Cardoso (Sporting CP)
- (Greece) Christodoulou (Panathinaikos)
- (Spain) Del Álamo (Real Madrid)
- (Portugal) ill. Inácio (Sporting CP)
- (Spain) Khallack (Real Madrid)
- (Spain) Marin (Real Madrid)
- (Spain) Nieto (Real Madrid)
- (Spain) Park (Real Madrid)
- (Portugal) Rui Reis (Sporting CP)
- (Portugal) Silva (Sporting CP)
- (Portugal) Filipe Sissé (Sporting CP)
- (Greece) Adriano Skenterai (Panathinaikos)
- (Hungary) Nándor Tamás (Budapest Honvéd)
- (Hungary) Norbert Szendrei (Budapest Honvéd)
- (Hungary) Norman Timári (Puskás Akadémia)
- (Spain) Vallo (Real Madrid)

=== Own goals ===
- (Hungary) Áron Csibi (Budapest Honvéd) against Puskás Akadémia
