= Panathinaikos F.C. Academy =

Panathinaikos Academy
- Full name: Panathinaikos Football Club Academy
- Founded: 1956; 70 years ago
- Ground: Georgios Kalafatis Sports Center
- Owner: Panathinaikos F.C.
- Chairman: Giannis Alafouzos
- Website: pao.gr
Home colours	Away colours	Third colours

Panathinaikos maintains youth and amateur departments since the 1950s, while Panathinaikos F.C. manage them since 1981. They cooperate with a network of 55 soccer schools in Greece (Panathinaikos FC Soccer Schools), while they were the first Greek club with academies abroad (Cyprus, United States, Australia, Canada, Israel).

== History ==
Since 1928 József Künsztler, coach of the first team, tried to rejuvenate the team with players from the second (reverse) team.

During the 1950s the ex-player of the team, Antonis Migiakis, had the leading role on the creation of the first youth departments of the club. First coaches were Harry Game and Svetislav Glišović. Migiakis was appointed later also as a coach the years 1967–69, 1971-74 και 1981–85. Andreas Papaemmanouil had also significant contribution.

During the presidency of Yiorgos Vardinogiannis the academy was re-organized. Alf Ramsey was appointed as Technical Director, while all the youth departments were housed in Paiania (training ground).

In 2005 Panathinaikos won the Copa Amsterdam, the annual youth football tournament, organized and hosted by AFC Ajax.

Since 2013, the academies are housed also in the Georgios Kalafatis Sports Center, the new athletic center of Panathinaikos FC.

== Honours ==
- Greek Amateur Cup^{1}: (2)
  - 1994, 1995
- Athens Cup^{1}: (2)
  - 1993, 1994
- Greek U-19 Championship: (3)
  - 2005, 2012, 2022
- Greek U-17 Championship: (2)
  - 2009, 2026
- Greek U-15 Championship: (1)
  - 2018
- Copa Amsterdam:
  - Winners (1): 2005
- Puskás Cup:
  - Runners-up (2): 2010, 2013

^{1}Competitions for amateur footballers, won by Panathinaikos' U-21 team (or Panathinaikos Amateurs, as it was called at that time).

== Players ==
=== U-19 squad ===
As of 22 November 2026

Note: Flags indicate national team as defined under FIFA eligibility rules; some limited exceptions apply. Players may hold more than one non-FIFA nationality.

No.	Pos.	Nation	Player
71	GK	GRE	Christos Geitonas
—	GK	GRE	Giannis Mponovas
—	GK	GRE	Filippos Papanikolaou
—	GK	GRE	Edri Elezi
56	DF	GRE	Vassilis Lavdas
—	DF	GRE	Antonis Dimakopoulos
—	DF	GRE	Nikos Semos
—	DF	GRE	Stefanos Tsigkas
—	DF	GRE	Serafim Chantzaras
—	DF	GRE	Giorgos Kalbourtzis
—	DF	GRE	Panagiotis Koumoukelis
—	DF	GRE	Nikos Vgontzas
—	DF	FRA	Junior Njimbam
44	MF	GRE	Panagiotis Biniaris
—	MF	GRE	Konstantinos Argyropoulos
—	MF	GRE	Konstantinos Theocharis

No.	Pos.	Nation	Player
—	MF	GRE	Stavros Ioannou
—	MF	GRE	Christoforos Karagounis
—	MF	GRE	Thomas Markezinis
—	MF	GRE	Filippos Bazoukis
—	MF	GRE	Kimonas Vasilopoulos
—	MF	GRE	Zacharias Petousis
—	MF	GRE	Nikolas Michailidis
53	FW	GRE	Iason Nempis
—	FW	GRE	Sotiris Terzis
—	FW	GRE	Andreas Kourouniotis
—	FW	GRE	Lambros Delibeis
—	FW	GRE	Nikos Papacharalambous
—	FW	GRE	Sotiris Kritikos
—	FW	ITA	Cleo Caoua
—	FW	GRE	Panagiotis Fotis
—	FW	GRE	Alexandros Vandiras

=== U-17 squad ===
As of 25 August 2026

Note: Flags indicate national team as defined under FIFA eligibility rules; some limited exceptions apply. Players may hold more than one non-FIFA nationality.

No.	Pos.	Nation	Player
—	GK	GRE	Konstantinos Tzatzakis
—	DF	GRE	Angelos Gkartzonikas
—	DF	GRE	Dimitris Xidias
—	DF	GRE	Vangelis Gexos
—	DF	CYP	Antonis Konis
—	DF	GRE	Spyros Athanasakis
—	MF	GRE	Othonas Karo
—	MF	GRE	Maximos Dabizas
—	MF	GRE	Sotiris Papakostas
—	MF	GRE	Panagiotis Manganielo

No.	Pos.	Nation	Player
—	MF	GRE	Dimitris Kokkinos
—	MF	GRE	Spyros Dimos
—	MF	GRE	Thanos Dimitrakopoulos
—	MF	GRE	Thanos Doukas
—	MF	GRE	Giorgos Kasimos
—	MF	GRE	Nikos Mygdalias
—	FW	GRE	Sotiris Kritikos
—	FW	GRE	Spyros Anastasiadis
—	FW	GRE	Panagiotis Misailidis
—	FW	GRE	Dimitris Lazaridis

=== U-15 squad ===
As of 8 November 2025

Note: Flags indicate national team as defined under FIFA eligibility rules; some limited exceptions apply. Players may hold more than one non-FIFA nationality.

No.	Pos.	Nation	Player
—	GK	GRE	Anastaskis Gkoltsios
—	GK	GRE	Vassilis Koufopoulos
—	GK	GRE	Michalis Papavasileiou
—	DF	GRE	Petros Angelopoulos
—	DF	GRE	Vassilis Grigoriadis
—	DF	GRE	Konstantinos Lampros
—	DF	GRE	Rafail Bouboukis
—	DF	GRE	Dimitris Milonas
—	DF	GRE	Anastasios Chartalis
—	DF	GRE	Stratos Psofakis
—	MF	GRE	Giannis Veloudis
—	MF	GRE	Paraskevas Gouliamtzis

No.	Pos.	Nation	Player
—	MF	GRE	Konstantinos Donis
—	MF	GRE	Giorgos Krasanakis
—	MF	GRE	Giannis Moisiadis
—	MF	ROU	Gabriel Ugureanu
—	MF	GRE	Giorgos Christanthopoulos
—	FW	GRE	Stelios Antoniadis
—	FW	GRE	Angelos Dimos
—	FW	GRE	Antonis Rallis
—	FW	GRE	Evangelos Pantazis
—	FW	GRE	Dimitris Petridis
—	FW	GRE	Nikolas Remoundos

== Notable players ==
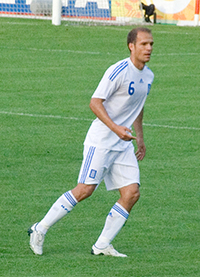
Angelos Basinas

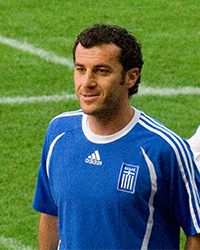
Giannis Goumas

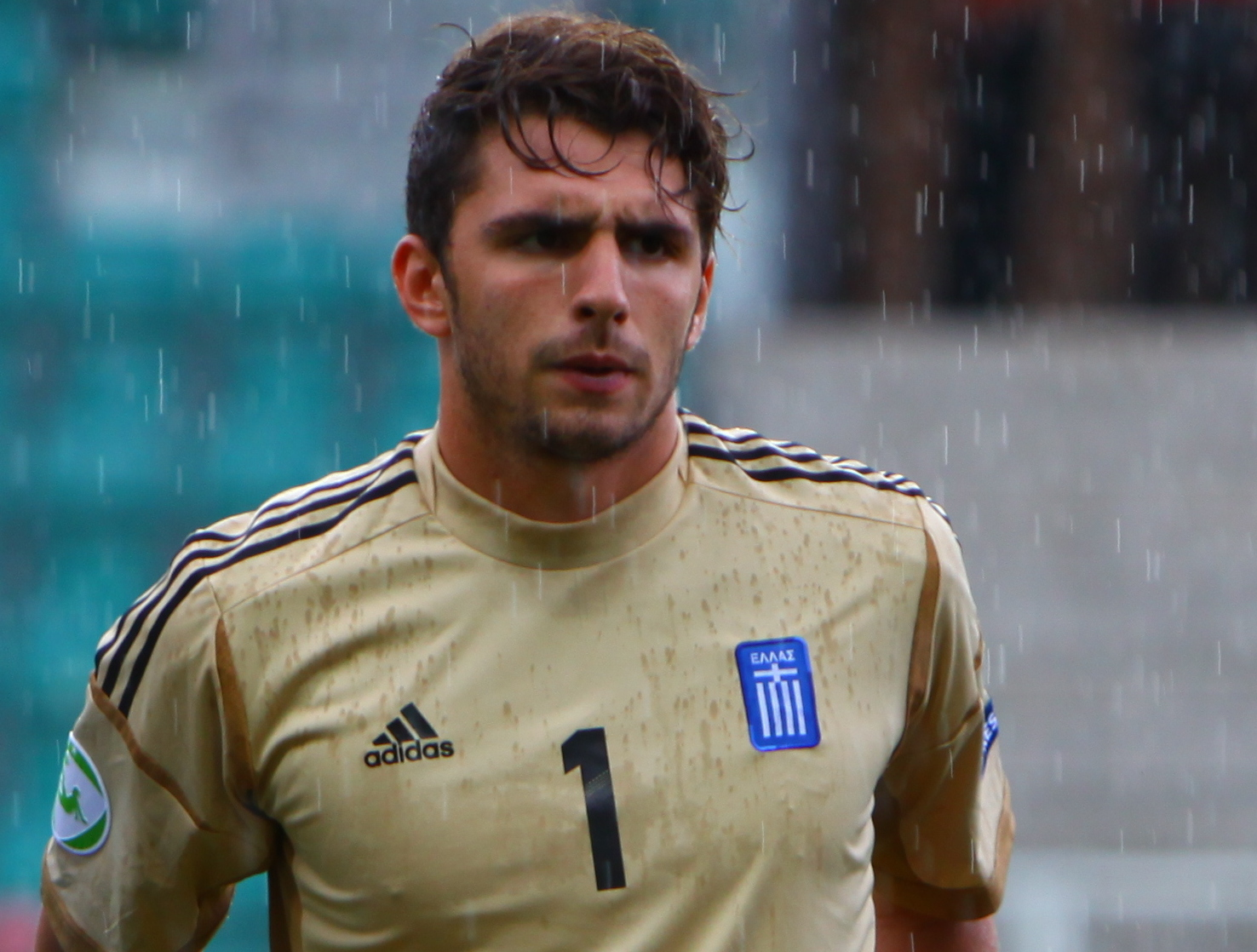
Stefanos Kapino

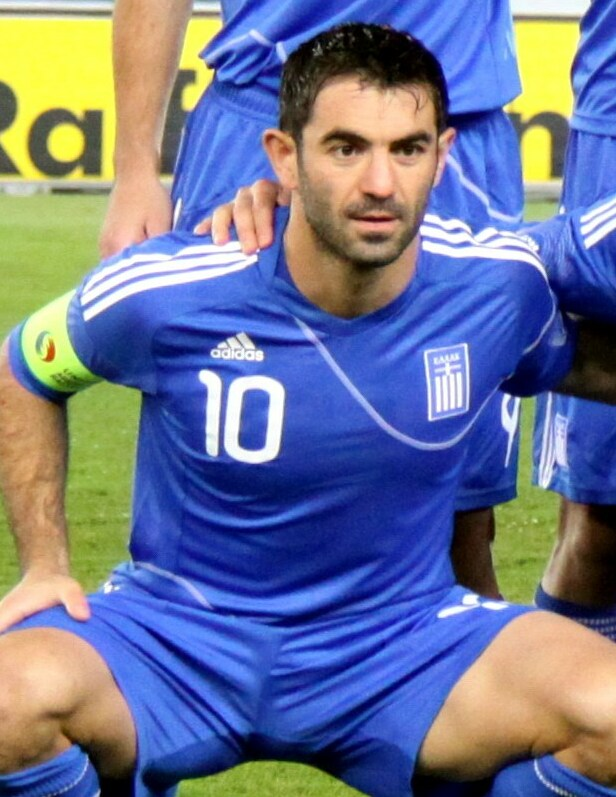
Giorgos Karagounis

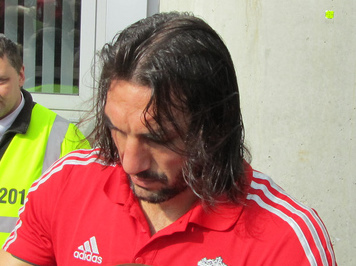
Sotirios Kyrgiakos

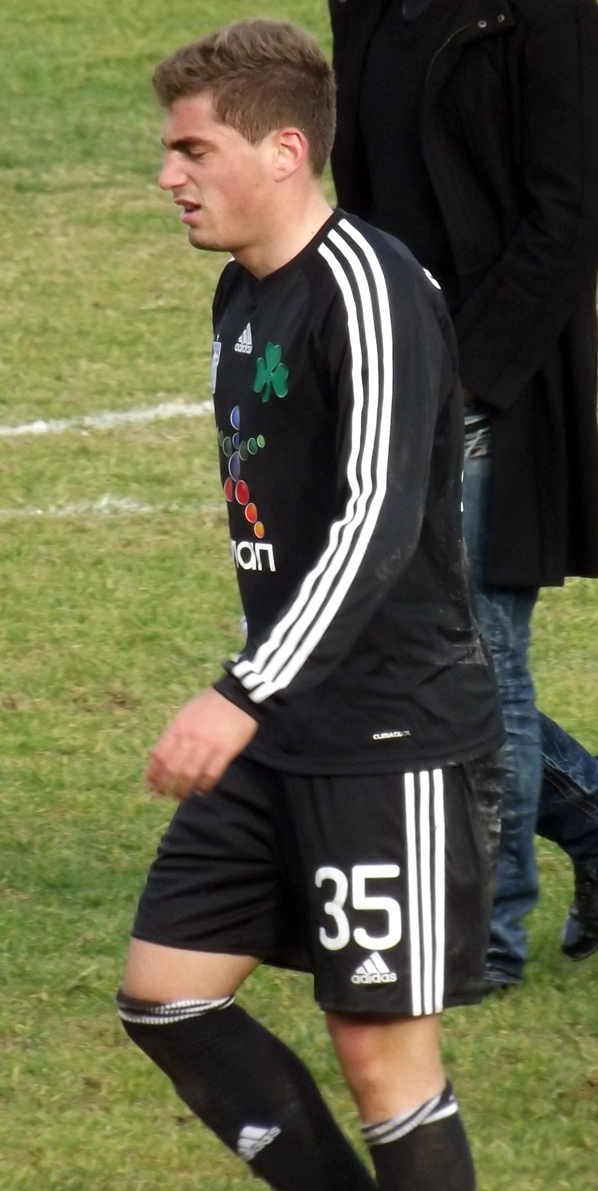
Charalampos Mavrias

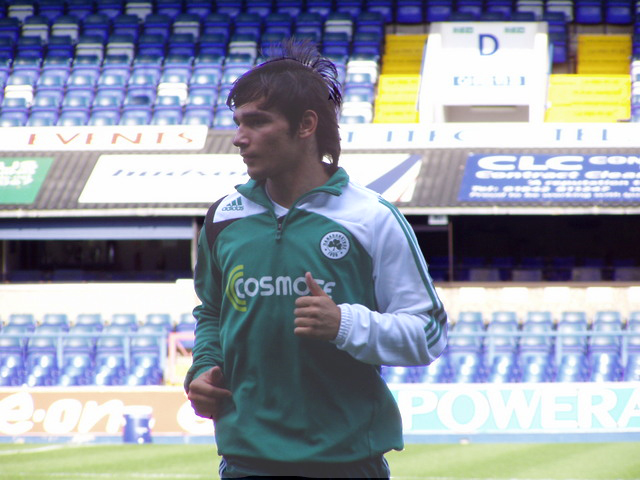
Sotiris Ninis

Notable players coming from the club's youth departments include:

- Sotiris Alexandropoulos
- Georgios Alexopoulos
- Kyriakos Andreopoulos
- Vasilis Angelopoulos
- Kostas Antoniou
- Angelos Basinas
- Giannis Bouzoukis
- Anastasios Chatzigiovanis
- Kostas Chalkias
- Diamantis Chouchoumis
- Lambros Choutos
- Christos Donis
- Spyros Fourlanos
- Nikos Giannitsanis
- Giannis Goumas
- Stefanos Kapino
- Giorgos Karagounis
- Stefanos Kotsolis
- Sotirios Kyrgiakos
- Anastasios Lagos
- Spiros Livathinos
- Charalampos Mavrias
- Nikos Marinakis
- Sotiris Ninis
- Spyros Risvanis
- Paschalis Staikos
- Konstantinos Triantafyllopoulos
- Alexandros Tzorvas
- Georgios Vagiannidis
- Georgios Vakouftsis
- Markos Vellidis

== Personnel ==
=== Academies staff ===
Position	Name
Academy director	(Greece) Thodoris Eleftheriadis
PAO FC Academies director	(Greece) Andreas Lagonikakis
Chief of Performance and Fitness	(Greece) Iason Vasiliadis
Chief Scout	(Greece) Giorgos Makris
Goalkeepers coach coordinator	(Greece) Giorgos Mountakis
U19 coach	(Greece) Angelos Zazopoulos
U19 assistant coach	(Greece) Georgios Tsintaris
U17 coach	(Greece) Ilias Kolovos
U17 assistant coach	(Greece) Vangelis Konstantinou
U16 coach	(Greece) Dimitris Tsatsopoulos
U16 assistant coach	(Greece) Giourkas Seitaridis
U15 coach	(Greece) Stavros Amanatidis
U15 assistant coach	(Greece) Stavros Tziortziopoulos
U14 coach	(Greece) Aristotelis Schizas
U14 assistant coach	(Greece) Stavros Tziortziopoulos
U13 coach	(Greece) Dimitris Katrimpouzas
U13 assistant coach	(Greece) Dimitris Koutsoulis
U12 & U11 coach	(Greece) Dimitris Papanastasis
U10 coach	(Greece) Apostolos Foukoulis
Fitness coach	(Greece) Panagiotis Grosios
Fitness coach	(Greece) Thodoris Pontidis
Fitness coach	(Greece) Panagiotis Geroulis
Fitness coach	(Greece) Sofia Martiou
Goalkeepers coach	(Greece) Konstantinos-Alexandros Alexakis
Goalkeepers coach	(Greece) Panagiotis Ikonomou
Goalkeepers coach	(Greece) Konstantinos Karatasakis
Goalkeepers coach	(Greece) Antonis Papatheodorou
Analyst	(Greece) Thodoris Sachinis
Analyst	(Greece) Dimitris Koutsoulis
Analyst	(Greece) Apostolis Foukoulis
Doctor	(Greece) Giannis Spyropoulos
Doctor	(Greece) Fotis Kakridonis
Doctor	(Greece) Spyros Balas
Doctor	(Greece) Dimitris Serenidis
Physiotherapist	(Greece) Giannis Gryparis
Physiotherapist	(Greece) Nikos Dedes
Physiotherapist	(Greece) Christos Zervopoulos
Physiotherapist	(Greece) Aris Kontos
Psychologist	(Greece) Giannis Kotsis
Scout	(Greece) Kostas Mavridis
Scout	(Greece) Kyriakos Konstantinidis
Scout	(Greece) Giorgos Famelis
Scout	(Greece) Dimitris Roussos
