= 2014 Puskás Cup =

Puskás Suzuki Cup

Tournament details
- Host country: Hungary
- Dates: 18 April – 21 April
- Teams: 6 (from 2 confederations)
- Venue: 1 (in 1 host city)

Final positions
- Champions: (Spain) Real Madrid
- Runners-up: (Hungary) Puskás Akadémia

Tournament statistics
- Top scorer(s): (Greece) Hatzigiannis Anastasios (Spain) Alberto Rubio (Croatia) Luka Visic
- Best player: (Hungary) Noel László

The 2014 Puskás Cup was the seventh edition of the Puskás Cup and took place between 18 April to 21 April in Felcsút, Hungary. Real Madrid were the defending champions.

On 3 March 2014, it was announced that the final match of the 2014 Puskás Cup will be the opening match of the new Pancho Arena. György Szöllősi, communication director of the Ferenc Puskás Football Academy, announced that there will be 4,500 spectators at the final of the 2014 Puskás Cup. Among the invited guests there will be the wife of Ferenc Puskás, the former Croatian football legend, Davor Šuker, the former German international and Hungary coach, Lothar Matthäus, former Videoton coach and Portugal international Paulo Sousa, and former Golden Team members Jenő Buzánszky and Gyula Grosics. The opening speech will be delivered by the president of the Hungarian Olympic Committee and former Hungarian MP Pál Schmitt and the president of the Spanish Football Federation, Ángel María Villar.

== Participating teams ==
- (Hungary) Budapest Honvéd (former club of Ferenc Puskás)
- (Croatia) Dinamo Zagreb (invited)
- (Australia) Melbourne Football Institute (invited)
- (Greece) Panathinaikos (former club of Ferenc Puskás)
- (Hungary) Puskás Akadémia (host)
- (Spain) Real Madrid (former club of Ferenc Puskás)

== Venues ==
Felcsút
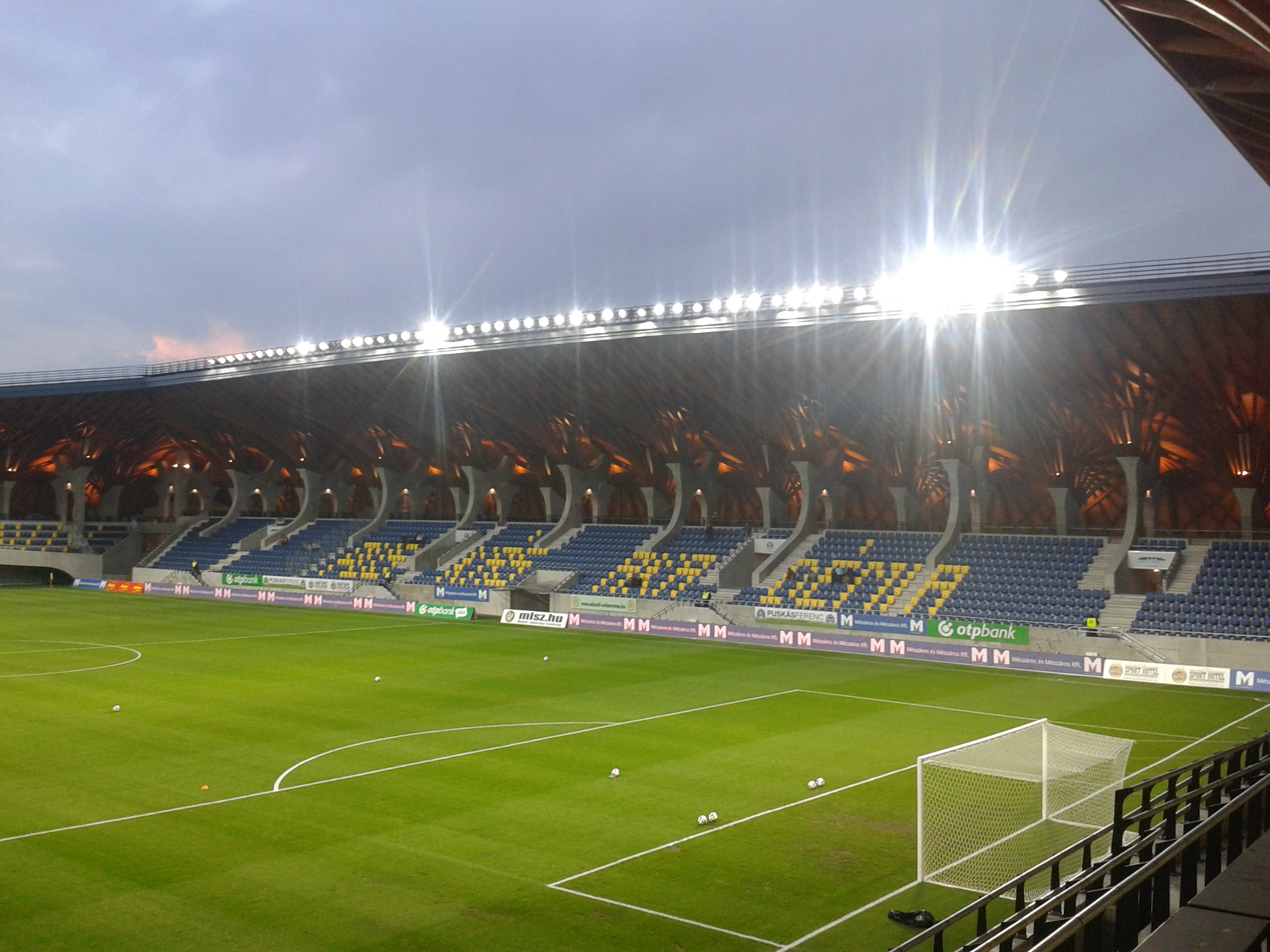
Pancho Arena
47°27′50″N 18°35′12″E
Capacity: 3,500

== Squads ==
=== Budapest Honvéd ===
Coach: András Rakonczay

Note: Flags indicate national team as defined under FIFA eligibility rules; some limited exceptions apply. Players may hold more than one non-FIFA nationality.

No.	Pos.	Nation	Player
—	GK	HUN	Márk Fölöp Ivicevic
—	GK	HUN	Dániel Vajda
—	DF	HUN	Zsolt Fék
—	DF	HUN	Dániel Kaposi
—	DF	HUN	Barna Nemes
—	DF	HUN	Ádám Tamaskó
—	DF	HUN	Márkó Varga
—	MF	HUN	János Bodrogi
—	MF	HUN	Imre Fehér
—	MF	HUN	Kristóf Herjeczki
—	MF	HUN	Viktor Kiss
—	MF	HUN	Dominik Rózsahegyi
—	MF	HUN	Soma Szellák
—	FW	HUN	Ákos Bíró
—	FW	HUN	Bence Bíró
—	FW	HUN	Bence Fehér
—	FW	HUN	Alexander Pendl
—	FW	HUN	Kristóf Szücs
—	FW	HUN	Dávid Soós
—	FW	HUN	Bálint Tömösvári

=== Dinamo Zagreb ===
Coach: Jozo Bandic

Note: Flags indicate national team as defined under FIFA eligibility rules; some limited exceptions apply. Players may hold more than one non-FIFA nationality.

No.	Pos.	Nation	Player
—	GK	CRO	Partik Gujić
—	GK	CRO	Adrian Šemper
—	DF	CRO	Filip Benković
—	DF	CRO	Toni Borevković
—	DF	CRO	Branimir Kalaica
—	DF	CRO	Tin Kulenović
—	DF	CRO	Karlo Plantak
—	DF	CRO	Borna Sosa
—	DF	CRO	Ivan Vujica
—	MF	CRO	Petar Botica
—	MF	CRO	Bojan Knežević
—	MF	CRO	Matija Fintić
—	MF	CRO	Nikola Moro
—	MF	CRO	Mihovil Rašić
—	MF	CRO	Maks Slunjski
—	FW	CRO	Andrej Bešlić
—	FW	CRO	Marijan Čabraja
—	FW	CRO	Tin Matić
—	FW	CRO	Borna Miklić
—	FW	CRO	Luka Viśić

=== Melbourne Football Institute ===
Coach:

Note: Flags indicate national team as defined under FIFA eligibility rules; some limited exceptions apply. Players may hold more than one non-FIFA nationality.

No.	Pos.	Nation	Player
—	GK	AUS	
—	GK	AUS	
—	DF	AUS	
—	DF	AUS	
—	DF	AUS	
—	DF	AUS	
—	MF	AUS	
—	MF	AUS	
—	MF	AUS	
—	MF	AUS	
—	FW	AUS	
—	FW	AUS	

=== Panathinaikos ===
Coach:

Note: Flags indicate national team as defined under FIFA eligibility rules; some limited exceptions apply. Players may hold more than one non-FIFA nationality.

No.	Pos.	Nation	Player
—	GK	GRE	
—	GK	GRE	
—	DF	GRE	
—	DF	GRE	
—	DF	GRE	
—	DF	GRE	
—	MF	GRE	
—	MF	GRE	
—	MF	GRE	
—	MF	GRE	
—	FW	GRE	
—	FW	GRE	

=== Puskás Akadémia ===
Coach: István Vincze

Note: Flags indicate national team as defined under FIFA eligibility rules; some limited exceptions apply. Players may hold more than one non-FIFA nationality.

No.	Pos.	Nation	Player
—	GK	HUN	Balázs Tóth
—	GK	HUN	Renátó Boros
—	DF	HUN	Norbert Göbölös
—	DF	HUN	Dániel Kertai
—	DF	HUN	Dávid Kiss
—	DF	HUN	Bonifác Csonka
—	DF	HUN	Noel László
—	DF	HUN	Sándor Nagy
—	DF	HUN	György Hursán
—	MF	HUN	De Oliveira Ayrton
—	MF	HUN	András Erdei
—	MF	HUN	Mátyás Tajti
—	MF	HUN	Bence Szabó
—	MF	HUN	Roland Sallai
—	FW	HUN	Levente Mezőssy
—	FW	HUN	Alex Damásdi
—	FW	HUN	Bence Péter
—	FW	HUN	Zsolt Óvári
—	FW	HUN	Szilárd Magyari
—	FW	HUN	Adrián Szőke

=== Real Madrid ===
Coach:

Note: Flags indicate national team as defined under FIFA eligibility rules; some limited exceptions apply. Players may hold more than one non-FIFA nationality.

No.	Pos.	Nation	Player
—	GK	ESP	Daniel Barbero Alvarez
—	GK	ESP	Francisco Harillo Becerra
—	DF	ESP	Aaron Areses Poderoso
—	DF	ESP	Rubén Bas Duque
—	DF	ESP	David Herrera Serrano
—	DF	ESP	Rubén Molina Selva
—	DF	ESP	Alex Salto Sanchez
—	DF	ESP	Javi Sánchez
—	DF	ESP	Jose Luis Sena Arbona
—	MF	ESP	Ignacio Arijon Navarro
—	MF	ESP	Dani Fernández
—	MF	ESP	Álvaro Fidalgo
—	MF	ESP	Miguel Garcia Lucio
—	MF	ESP	Jacobo González
—	MF	ESP	Jaume Grau
—	MF	ESP	Mario Rodríguez
—	MF	ESP	Jaime Seoane
—	FW	ESP	Inaki Dorado Fernandez
—	FW	ESP	Borja Mayoral
—	FW	ESP	Álvaro Rivero

== Results ==
All times are local (UTC+2).

=== Group A ===
Team	Pld	W	D	L	GF	GA	GD	Pts
(Hungary) Puskás Akadémia	2	2	0	0	3	1	+2	6
(Croatia) Dinamo Zagreb	1	1	0	1	5	1	+4	3
(Greece) Panathinaikos	1	0	0	2	1	7	-6	0

Team qualified for finals
Team qualified for 3rd place match
18 April 2014
12:00

(Hungary) Puskás Akadémia	2–1	(Greece) Panathinaikos
Sallai 23' 38'	Report	Chatzigiovannis 30'

Pitch 5, Felcsút

19 April 2014
14:15

(Hungary) Puskás Akadémia	1–0	(Croatia) Dinamo Zagreb
Damásdi 28'	Report

Pitch 1, Felcsút

20 April 2014
14:00

(Greece) Panathinaikos	0–5	(Croatia) Dinamo Zagreb
	Report	Jelic 15'; Visic 19'; Fintic 38'; Rasic 41' 65'

Pitch 1, Felcsút

=== Group B ===
Team	Pld	W	D	L	GF	GA	GD	Pts
(Spain) Real Madrid	2	2	0	0	12	0	+12	6
(Hungary) Budapest Honvéd	1	1	0	1	7	4	+3	3
(Australia) Melbourne Football Institute	1	0	0	2	2	17	-15	0

Team qualified for finals
Team qualified for 3rd place match
18 April 2014
14:15

(Spain) Real Madrid	2–0	(Hungary) Budapest Honvéd
Mayoral 46'; Rubio 77'	Report

Pitch 1, Felcsút

19 April 2014
12:00

(Spain) Real Madrid	10–0	(Australia) Melbourne Football Institute
Majoral 5'; Rodríguez 9' 39'; Seoane 31'; Rubio 32' 34'; Arijón 40'; Fernandez 44' 54'; Dorado 73'	Report

Pitch 5, Felcsút

20 April 2014
16:15

(Hungary) Budapest Honvéd	7–2	(Australia) Melbourne Football Institute
Bíró Ákos 11'; Rózsahegyi 13' 81'; Bíró Bence 19'; Varga 38'; Soós 40'; Herjeczki 72'	Report	Makalovski 35' 52'

Pitch 1, Felcsút

=== Fifth place play-off ===
21 April 2014
11:00

(Greece) Panathinaikos	4–2	(Australia) Melbourne Football Institute
Haciogiovannisz 21' 25'; Merai 36'; Rumposz 69'	Report	Sztamulisz 73'; Papanikolau 77'

Pitch 2, Felcsút

=== Third place play-off ===
21 April 2014
13:15

(Croatia) Dinamo Zagreb	3–0	(Hungary) Budapest Honvéd
Visic 7'; Čabraja 24'; Kulenović 36'	Report

Pitch 5, Felcsút

=== Final ===
21 April 2014
19:00

(Spain) Real Madrid	1–0	(Hungary) Puskás Akadémia
Miguel García 49'	Report

Pancho Arena, Felcsút
Referee: Viktor Kassai

== Goal scorers ==
Rank	Player	Team	Goals
1.	(Spain) Alberto Rubio	(Spain) Real Madrid	3
2.	(Hungary) Roland Sallai	(Hungary) Puskás Akadémia	2
2.	(Spain) Borja Mayoral	(Spain) Real Madrid	2
2.	(Spain) Mario Rodríguez	(Spain) Real Madrid	2
2.	(Spain) Inaki Dorado	(Spain) Real Madrid	2
3.	(Spain) Jaime Seoane	(Spain) Real Madrid	1
3.	(Spain) Álvaro Fidalgo	(Spain) Real Madrid	1
3.	(Spain) Daniel Fernández	(Spain) Real Madrid	1
3.	(Hungary) Alex Damásdi	(Hungary) Puskás Akadémia	1
3.	(Greece) Anastasios Chatzigiovannis	(Greece) Panathinaikos	1
