= 2015 Puskás Cup =

Puskás Suzuki Cup

Tournament details
- Host country: Hungary
- Dates: 3 April – 6 April
- Teams: 6 (from 1 confederation)
- Venue: 1 (in 1 host city)

Final positions
- Champions: (Hungary) Budapest Honvéd (4th title)
- Runners-up: (Spain) La Fábrica

Tournament statistics
- Matches played: 9
- Goals scored: 28 (3.11 per match)
- Top scorer: (Spain) Gómez Alcón (4) (La Fábrica)

The 2015 Puskás Cup was the eighth edition of the Puskás Cup and took place between 3 April to 6 April in Felcsút, Hungary. La Fábrica were the defending champions. One new team, Feyenoord Academy, were invited by the organisers for this event.

On 26 March 2015, the draw took place in Felcsút, Hungary. At the drawing, former Feyenoord and Bayern Munich star Roy Makaay was also present.

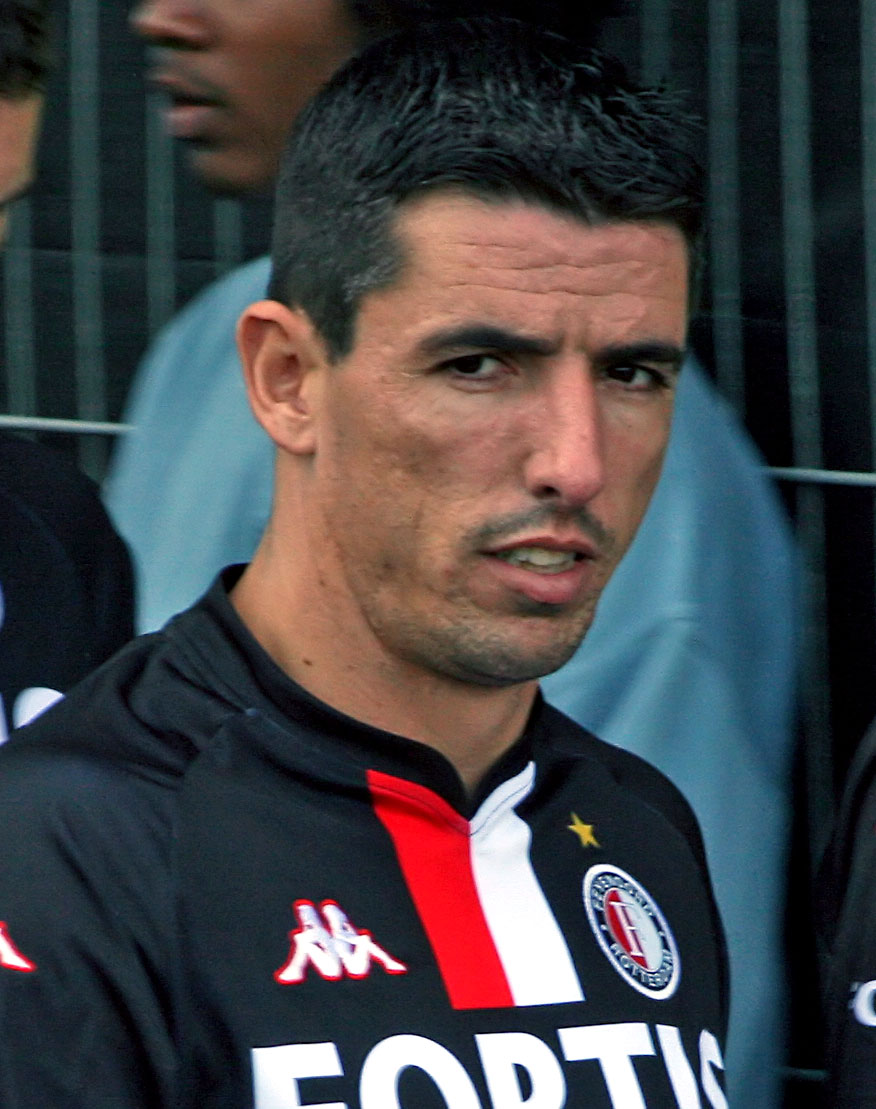
Former Feyenoord star, Roy Makaay drew the teams for the 2015 Puskás Cup in Felcsút, Hungary

The 2015 Puskás Cup was won by Budapest Honvéd by beating three-time champions La Fábrica in the final on 6 April 2015 at the Pancho Arena in Felcsút. Hagi Academy finished third by beating Feyenoord Academy. The home side, Puskás Akadémia finished fifth by beating Panathinaikos 2–1.

== Participating teams ==
- (Hungary) Budapest Honvéd (former club of Ferenc Puskás)
- (Spain) La Fábrica (former club of Ferenc Puskás)
- (Netherlands) Feyenoord Academy (invited)
- (Romania) Hagi Academy (invited)
- (Greece) Panathinaikos (former club of Ferenc Puskás)
- (Hungary) Puskás Akadémia (host)

== Venues ==
Felcsút
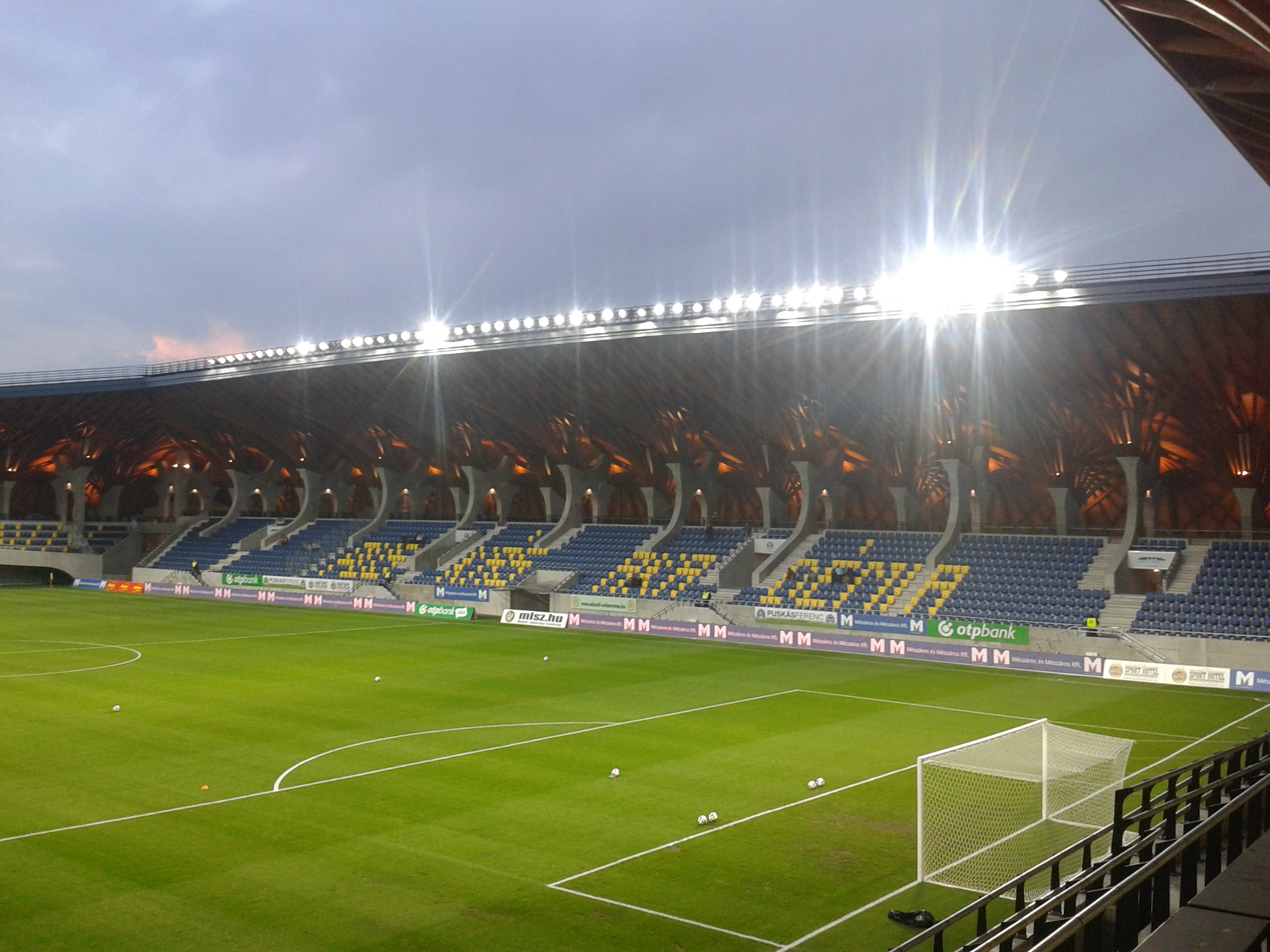
Pancho Arena
47°27′50″N 18°35′12″E
Capacity: 3,500

== Squads ==
=== Budapest Honvéd ===
Coach: Tibor Farkas

Note: Flags indicate national team as defined under FIFA eligibility rules; some limited exceptions apply. Players may hold more than one non-FIFA nationality.

No.	Pos.	Nation	Player
—	GK	HUN	Attila Berla
—	GK	HUN	Dániel Vajda
—	DF	HUN	Szilárd Bence
—	DF	HUN	Botond Erdélyi
—	DF	HUN	Bálint Falusy
—	DF	HUN	Bence Gergényi
—	DF	HUN	Ákos Király
—	DF	HUN	Barna Nemes
—	DF	HUN	Dániel Váczi
—	MF	HUN	János Bodrogi
—	MF	HUN	Tamás Károly Hegedűs
—	MF	HUN	Dávid Soós
—	FW	HUN	Ákos Bíró
—	FW	HUN	Kristóf Herjeczki
—	FW	HUN	Nikolasz Kovács
—	FW	HUN	Roland Vajda

=== La Fábrica ===
Coach: Tristán David Celador

Note: Flags indicate national team as defined under FIFA eligibility rules; some limited exceptions apply. Players may hold more than one non-FIFA nationality.

No.	Pos.	Nation	Player
—	GK	ESP	Javier Belman
—	GK	ESP	Brian
—	DF	ESP	Cedenilla
—	DF	ESP	Cobo
—	DF	ESP	Achraf
—	DF	ESP	Javier
—	DF	ESP	Álex Martín
—	DF	ESP	Soti
—	MF	ESP	Nebai
—	MF	ESP	Gori
—	MF	ESP	Maldonado
—	MF	ESP	Álvaro Martín
—	MF	ESP	Christian
—	MF	ESP	Óscar
—	FW	ESP	Barea
—	FW	ESP	Dani Gómez
—	FW	ESP	Llario
—	FW	ESP	Ousama

=== Feyenoord Academy ===
Coach: Cor Adriaanse

Note: Flags indicate national team as defined under FIFA eligibility rules; some limited exceptions apply. Players may hold more than one non-FIFA nationality.

No.	Pos.	Nation	Player
—	GK	NED	Justin Bijlow
—	GK	NED	Ramón ten Hove
—	DF	NED	Clarence Bijl
—	DF	NED	Wesley de Sterke
—	DF	NED	Tobias Elmensdorp
—	DF	NED	Micha Hempenius
—	DF	NED	Mats Knoester
—	DF	NED	Bart Sinteur
—	MF	NED	Salih Anez
—	MF	NED	Shurendo Janga
—	MF	NED	Nino Roffelsen
—	MF	NED	Steven Smulder
—	MF	NED	Jordy Wehrmann
—	FW	NED	Tahith Chong
—	FW	NED	Tarik Fagrach
—	FW	NED	Rashaan Fernandes
—	FW	NED	Nigel Robertha
—	FW	NED	Ryan Tilborg

=== Hagi Academy ===
Coach: Nicolae Rosca

Note: Flags indicate national team as defined under FIFA eligibility rules; some limited exceptions apply. Players may hold more than one non-FIFA nationality.

No.	Pos.	Nation	Player
—	GK	ROU	Cosmin Dur-Bozoanca
—	GK	ROU	Rares Murariu
—	DF	ROU	Tudor Baluta
—	DF	HUN	Szilárd Bence
—	DF	ROU	Tiberiu Capusa
—	DF	ROU	Virgil Ghita
—	DF	HUN	Szabolcs Kilyen
—	DF	ROU	Andrei Rusu
—	DF	ROU	Andre Vladescu
—	MF	ROU	Carlo Casap
—	MF	ROU	Doru Dumitrescu
—	MF	ROU	Mihai Ene
—	MF	ROU	Ianis Hagi
—	MF	ROU	Andreas Iani
—	MF	ROU	Alexandru Tranca
—	FW	ROU	Andrei Ciobanu
—	FW	ROU	Florinel Coman
—	FW	ROU	Mircera Manole
—	FW	ROU	Alexandru Mățan

=== Panathinaikos ===
Coach: Henk Herder

Note: Flags indicate national team as defined under FIFA eligibility rules; some limited exceptions apply. Players may hold more than one non-FIFA nationality.

No.	Pos.	Nation	Player
—	GK	GRE	Konstantinos Chalkidis
—	GK	GRE	Vasileios Xenopoulos
—	DF	GRE	Antonios Oikonomopoulos
—	DF	GRE	Evangelos Theocharis
—	DF	GRE	Andreas Zikos
—	MF	GRE	Konstantinos Apostolakis
—	MF	GRE	Ioannis Bouzoukis
—	MF	GRE	Nikolaos Themistoklis Manios
—	MF	GRE	Theodoros Mingos
—	MF	GRE	Emmanouil Samios
—	MF	GRE	Konstantinos Valmas
—	MF	GRE	Evangelos Xepapadakis
—	FW	GRE	Petros Agiasiotis
—	FW	GRE	Athanasios Dimitroulas
—	FW	GRE	Christos Kountouriotis
—	FW	GRE	Panteleimon Pispas Sotirios
—	FW	GRE	Aristeidis Vrachalis

=== Puskás Akadémia ===
Coach: Károly Varga

Note: Flags indicate national team as defined under FIFA eligibility rules; some limited exceptions apply. Players may hold more than one non-FIFA nationality.

No.	Pos.	Nation	Player
—	GK	HUN	Péter Balogh
—	GK	HUN	Bence Gundel-Takács
—	DF	HUN	Erik Keszi
—	DF	HUN	Dávid Kiss
—	DF	HUN	Dániel Radó
—	DF	HUN	Tamás Rétyi
—	DF	HUN	Zoltán Terplán
—	DF	HUN	Bence Tóth
—	MF	HUN	Máté Keményffy
—	MF	HUN	Patrik Réti
—	MF	HUN	Bence Szabó
—	MF	HUN	Keve Tóth
—	MF	HUN	Gábor Végh
—	FW	HUN	Zsombor Bévárdi
—	FW	HUN	György Kamarás
—	FW	HUN	Zoltán Kováts
—	FW	HUN	Szilárd Magyari
—	FW	HUN	Bence Zsigmond

== Results ==
All times are local (UTC+2).

=== Group A ===
Team	Pld	W	D	L	GF	GA	GD	Pts
(Spain) La Fábrica	2	1	1	0	6	3	+3	4
(Netherlands) Feyenoord Academy	2	1	1	0	4	3	+1	4
(Hungary) Puskás Akadémia	2	0	0	2	2	6	-4	0

Team qualified for the Final
Team qualified for the Third place play-off
3 April 2015
11:00

(Hungary) Puskás Akadémia	1–2	(Netherlands) Feyenoord Academy
Végh 49'	Report	Vente 7'; Fagrach 28'

Pancho Arena, Felcsút

4 April 2015
11:00

(Hungary) Puskás Akadémia	1–4	(Spain) La Fábrica
Zsigmond	Report	Alcántara; Gómez Alcón; Rodriguez Arnaiz; Hernández Cruz

Pancho Arena, Felcsút

5 April 2015
11:00

(Netherlands) Feyenoord Academy	2–2	(Spain) La Fábrica
Robertha 41'; Chong 62'	Report	Gómez Alcón 4'; Llario Moscardo 15'

Pancho Arena, Felcsút

=== Group B ===
Team	Pld	W	D	L	GF	GA	GD	Pts
(Hungary) Budapest Honvéd	2	2	0	0	3	1	+2	6
(Romania) Hagi Academy	2	1	0	1	4	3	+1	3
(Greece) Panathinaikos	2	0	0	2	1	4	-3	0

Team qualified for the Final
Team qualified for the Third place play-off
3 April 2015
13:30

(Hungary) Budapest Honvéd	2–1	(Romania) Hagi Academy
Váczi; Tömösvári	Report	Ciobanu

Pancho Arena, Felcsút

4 April 2015
13:30

(Hungary) Budapest Honvéd	1–0	(Greece) Panathinaikos
Vajda 7'	Report

Pancho Arena, Felcsút

5 April 2015
13:30

(Romania) Hagi Academy	3–1	(Greece) Panathinaikos
Casap 20'; Coman 37' 72'	Report	Valmas 62'

Pancho Arena, Felcsút

=== Fifth place play-off ===
6 April 2015
12:00

(Hungary) Puskás Akadémia	2–1	(Greece) Panathinaikos
Zsigmond 7'; Magyari 80'	Report	Pispas 43'

Pancho Arena, Felcsút

=== Third place play-off ===
6 April 2015
14:00

(Netherlands) Feyenoord Academy	0–1	(Romania) Hagi Academy
	Report	Vladescu 41'

Pancho Arena, Felcsút

=== Final ===
6 April 2015
16:30

(Spain) La Fábrica	2–2 (p 1-3)	(Hungary) Budapest Honvéd
Gómez Alcón 36' 74'	Report	Vajda 8'; Tömösvári 45'

Pancho Arena, Felcsút

== Statistics ==
=== Goalscorers ===
4 goals

- (Spain) Gómez Alcón (La Fábrica)

2 goals

- (Romania) Florinel Coman (Hagi Academy)
- (Hungary) Bence Zsigmond (Puskás Akadémia)
- (Hungary) Bálint Tömösvári (Budapest Honvéd)
- (Hungary) Roland Vajda (Budapest Honvéd)

1 goal

- (Hungary) Dániel Váczi (Budapest Honvéd)
- (Spain) Álvaro Martín Alcántara (La Fábrica)
- (Spain) Llario Mascardó (La Fábrica)
- (Spain) Nebai Hernández Cruz (La Fábrica)
- (Spain) Oscar Rodriguez Arnaiz (La Fábrica)
- (Netherlands) Robertha Nigel (Feyenoord Academy)
- (Netherlands) Tarik Fagrach (Feyenoord Academy)
- (Netherlands) Dylan Vente (Feyenoord Academy)
- (Romania) Casap Carlo (Hagi Academy)
- (Romania) Andrei Ciobanu (Hagi Academy)
- (Romania) Andre Vladescu (Hagi Academy)
- (Greece) Konstantinos Valmas (Panathinaikos)
- (Greece) Panteleimon Pispas Sotirios (Panathinaikos)
- (Hungary) Gábor Végh (Puskás Akadémia)
- (Hungary) Szilárd Magyari (Puskás Akadémia)
