= 2008 Puskás Cup =

Puskás Suzuki Cup

Tournament details
- Host country: Hungary
- Dates: 10 June – 14 June
- Teams: 4 (from 1 confederation)
- Venue: 2 (in 2 host cities)

Final positions
- Champions: (Spain) Real Madrid C.F. (1st title)
- Runners-up: (Hungary) Puskás Akadémia FC

The 2008 Puskás Cup was the first edition of the Puskás Cup and took place 2 April to 5 April. Real Madrid C.F. won their first title by defeating Puskás Akadémia FC 5-1 in the final.

== Participating teams ==
- (Hungary) Budapest Honvéd FC (former club of Ferenc Puskás)
- (Greece) Panathinaikos F.C. (former club of Ferenc Puskás)
- (Hungary) Puskás Academy (host)
- (Spain) Real Madrid C.F. (former club of Ferenc Puskás)

== Venues ==
- Stadion Sóstói
- Felcsút

== Results ==
Semi-finals
14 June – Felcsút
(Greece) Panathinaikos	0
(Spain) Real Madrid	3
14 June – Felcsút
(Hungary) Budapest Honvéd	0
(Hungary) Puskás Academy	1

Final
18 June – Felcsút
(Spain) Real Madrid	5
(Hungary) Puskás Academy	1
Third place
17 June – Felcsút
(Greece) Panathinaikos	1
(Hungary) Budapest Honvéd	0

== Goal scorers ==
Source: https://web.archive.org/web/20140531124719/http://www.puskassuzukicup.net/tortenet2008

4 goals

- Fran Sol (Real Madrid)

1 goal

- Csurka (Puskás Academy)
- Ádám Gyurcsó (Puskás Academy)
- Makaronas (Panathinaikos)
- Boto (Real Madrid)
- De las Heras (Real Madrid)
- Exposito (Real Madrid)

own goal

- Liolos (Panathinaikos)
