= 2012 Puskás Cup =

Puskás Suzuki Cup

Tournament details
- Host country: Hungary
- Dates: 6 April – 9 April
- Teams: 6 (from 2 confederations)
- Venue: 1 (in 1 host city)

Final positions
- Champions: (Hungary) Budapest Honvéd
- Runners-up: (Hungary) Puskás Akadémia

Tournament statistics
- Matches played: 9
- Goals scored: 32 (3.56 per match)

The 2012 Puskás Cup was the fifth edition of the Puskás Cup and took place 6 April to 8 April. Budapest Honvéd FC were the defending champions and they won their third title by defeating Puskás Akadémia 7–0 in the final where Gergely Bobál scored 4 goals.

== Participating teams ==
- Austria Wien (invited)
- (Hungary) Budapest Honvéd (former club of Ferenc Puskás)
- (Romania) Hagi Football Academy (invited)
- (Greece) Panathinaikos (former club of Ferenc Puskás)
- (Hungary) Puskás Academy (host)
- (Spain) Real Madrid (former club of Ferenc Puskás)

== Squads ==
=== Puskás ===
- (Hungary) Tamás Rácz goalkeeper 1995. 03. 28.
- (Hungary) Máté Wittner goalkeeper 1995. 06. 07.
- (Hungary) Dénes Baksa defender 1995. 02. 17.
- (Hungary) Gergő Dobsa defender 1995. 04. 21.
- (Hungary) Bence Király defender 1995. 02. 20.
- (Hungary) Márton Lorentz defender 1995. 02. 01.
- (Hungary) Csaba Spandler defender 1996. 03. 07.
- (Hungary) Baltazár Büki midfielder 1995. 02. 19.
- (Hungary) Szabolcs Fényes midfielder 1995. 04. 30.
- (Hungary) Gábor Illés midfielder 1995. 05. 22.
- (Hungary) Tibor Oldal midfielder 1995. 01. 26.
- (Hungary) Donát Szelei midfielder 1995. 10. 10.
- (Hungary) Márk Tóth midfielder 1995. 07. 16.
- (Hungary) Dominique Vallejos midfielder 1995. 10. 22.
- (Hungary) Donát Zsótér midfielder 1996. 01. 06.
- (Hungary) Máté Molnár forward 1995. 03. 24.
- (Hungary) Erik Németh forward 1996. 02. 07.
- (Hungary) László Tóth forward 1995. 07. 09.
- (Hungary) Viktor Vincze forward 1995. 09. 09.

=== Panathinaikos ===
- (Greece) Nestoras Gekas goalkeeper 1995. 03. 07.
- (Greece) Konstantinos Kotsaris goalkeeper 1996. 07. 25.
- (Greece) Panagiotis ARNAOUTO GLOUMÁLAGA defender 1996. 05. 30.
- (South Africa) Adam Elgamal defender 1995. 06. 26.
- (Greece) Efstathitos Nikiforos defender 1995. 08. 05.
- (Greece) Andreas Plessas defender 1996. 06. 10.
- (Greece) Marios Tzanoulinos defender 1996. 04. 15.
- (Greece) Alexandros Vosdou defender 1995. 01. 16.
- (Greece) Dimitrios Mirthianos defender 1995. 08. 13.
- (Greece) David Gizgizian midfielder 1995. 07. 08.
- (Greece) Nikolaos Krasonis midfielder 1995. 01. 25.
- (Greece) Dimitrios Ntagaras midfielder 1995. 09. 04.
- (Greece) Mario Bamicha midfielder 1996. 07. 03.
- (Greece) Michal-Peter Newman midfielder 1996. 06. 20.
- (Greece) Panagiotis Staikos midfielder 1996. 02. 08.
- (Greece) Maldin Ymerai midfielder 1995. 03. 06.
- (Greece) Anastasios Donis forward 1996. 08. 29.
- (Greece) Lampros Thanailakis forward 1995. 12. 17.

== Venues ==
- Felcsút

== Results ==
All times are local (UTC+2).

=== Group A ===
Team	Pld	W	D	L	GF	GA	GD	Pts
(Hungary) Puskás Academy	2	1	1	0	4	3	+1	4
(Greece) Panathinaikos	2	1	0	1	4	4	+0	3
(Spain) Real Madrid	2	0	1	1	4	5	-1	1

6 April 2012
16:00

(Greece) Panathinaikos	1-2	(Hungary) Puskás Academy

7 April 2012
14:00

(Hungary) Puskás Academy	2-2	(Spain) Real Madrid

8 April 2012
14:00

(Greece) Panathinaikos	3-2	(Spain) Real Madrid

=== Group B ===
Team	Pld	W	D	L	GF	GA	GD	Pts
(Hungary) Budapest Honvéd	2	2	0	0	8	1	+7	6
Austria Wien	2	1	0	1	2	5	-3	3
(Romania) Hagi Football Academy	2	0	0	2	0	4	-4	0

6 April 2012
14:00

(Hungary) Budapest Honvéd	3-0	(Romania) Hagi Football Academy

7 April 2012
16:00

(Hungary) Budapest Honvéd	5-1	Austria Wien

9 April 2012
16:00

(Romania) Hagi Football Academy	0-1	Austria Wien

=== Fifth place play-off ===
9 April 2012
11:00

(Spain) Real Madrid	3-0	(Romania) Hagi Football Academy

Center pálya, Felcsút

=== Third place play-off ===
9 April 2012
13:15

(Greece) Panathinaikos	0-0 (p. 4-5)	Austria Wien

Center pálya, Felcsút

=== Final ===
9 April 2012
19:00

(Hungary) Budapest Honvéd	7-0	(Hungary) Puskás Academy
Koszta 9'; Bobál 19' 45' 61' 73'; Csillag 23'; Tüzes 78'

Center pálya, Felcsút
