= 2011 Puskás Cup =

Puskás Suzuki Cup

Tournament details
- Host country: Hungary
- Dates: 22 April – 25 April
- Teams: 6 (from 2 confederations)
- Venue: 1 (in 1 host city)

Final positions
- Champions: (Hungary) Budapest Honvéd
- Runners-up: (Spain) Real Madrid

Tournament statistics
- Matches played: 9
- Goals scored: 34 (3.78 per match)

The 2011 Puskás Cup was the fourth edition of the Puskás Cup and took place 6 April to 8 April. Budapest Honvéd FC were the defending champions and they won their second title by defeating Real Madrid on penalty shoot-out (5-4) after a 1–1 draw in the final.

== Participating teams ==
- (Hungary) Budapest Honvéd (former club of Ferenc Puskás)
- (Hungary) Ferencváros (invited)
- (Romania) Hagi Football Academy (invited)
- (Greece) Panathinaikos (former club of Ferenc Puskás)
- (Hungary) Puskás Academy (host)
- (Spain) Real Madrid (former club of Ferenc Puskás)

== Venues ==
- Felcsút

== Results ==
All times are local (UTC+2).

=== Group A ===
Team	Pld	W	D	L	GF	GA	GD	Pts
(Spain) Real Madrid	2	2	0	0	7	1	+6	6
(Hungary) Puskás Academy	2	1	0	1	3	3	+0	3
(Hungary) Ferencváros	2	0	0	2	3	9	-6	0

22 April 2011
15:00

(Hungary) Puskás Academy	3-2	(Hungary) Ferencváros

23 April 2011
18:00

(Hungary) Puskás Academy	0-1	(Spain) Real Madrid

24 April 2011
15:00

(Hungary) Ferencváros	1-6	(Spain) Real Madrid

=== Group B ===
Team	Pld	W	D	L	GF	GA	GD	Pts
(Hungary) Budapest Honvéd	2	2	0	0	6	1	+5	6
(Greece) Panathinaikos	2	1	0	1	5	5	+0	3
(Romania) Hagi Football Academy	2	0	0	2	1	6	-5	0

22 April 2011
17:00

(Hungary) Budapest Honvéd	2-0	(Romania) Hagi Football Academy

23 April 2011
16:00

(Hungary) Budapest Honvéd	4-1	(Greece) Panathinaikos

24 April 2011
17:00

(Romania) Hagi Football Academy	1-4	(Greece) Panathinaikos

=== Fifth place play-off ===
25 April 2011
13:00

(Hungary) Ferencváros	1-1 (4-2)	(Romania) Hagi Football Academy

Stadion Sóstói, Székesfehérvár

=== Third place play-off ===
25 April 2011
15:00

(Greece) Panathinaikos	3-2	(Hungary) Puskás Academy

Stadion Sóstói, Székesfehérvár

=== Final ===
25 April 2011
17:00

(Hungary) Budapest Honvéd	1-1 (5-4)	(Spain) Real Madrid

Stadion Sóstói, Székesfehérvár
Referee: Viktor Kassai
