= Puskás Cup =

- Founded: 2008
- Region: Hungary
- Teams: 6
- Current champions: (Spain) Real Madrid (7th title)
- Most championships: (Spain) Real Madrid (7 titles)
- Broadcaster: Sport 1
- Website: www.puskassuzukicup.net

Puskás Cup or Puskás-Suzuki Kupa is an international football tournament founded by the Ferenc Puskás Football Academy in Felcsút, Hungary and the Magyar Suzuki Corporation in 2008. The aim of the founders is to establish a club tournament which offers the opportunity for talented young footballers to measure themselves internationally at the U-17 age level and to establish a fitting memorial to Ferenc Puskás.

== History ==
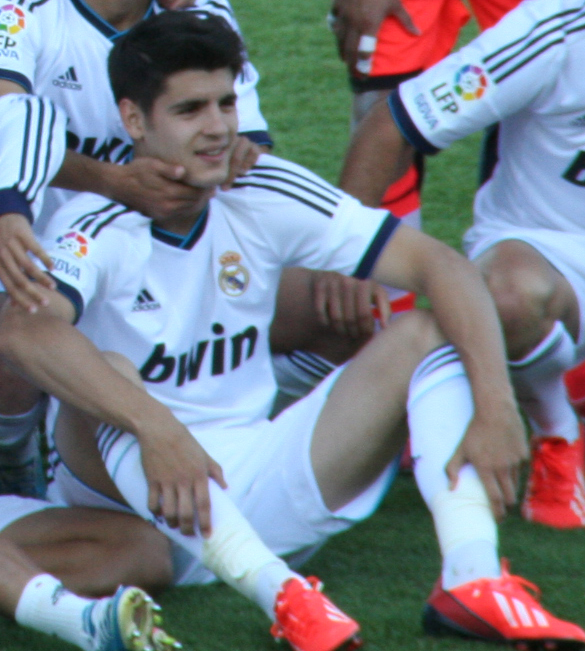
Real Madrid's Morata played at the 2009 Puskás Cup

In 2008, four teams competed for the first ever Puskás Cup trophy which was finally won by La Fabrica, the youth team of Ferenc Puskás's former club Real Madrid C.F.

In 2009, six teams participated and the final match was broadcast in three different countries (the Czech Republic, Slovakia, and Romania) and the official Real Madrid TV aired a summary of the tournament.

In 2010, AC Milan were the first Italian club to be invited to participate in the Puskás-Suzuki Cup. The best goalkeeper of the tournament was Georgios Kollias (Panathinaikos), the best player was Spidron Furlanos (Panathinaikos), and the top goalscorer was Valér Kapacina (Budapest Honvéd).

The 2012 Puskás Cup was won by Budapest Honvéd by beating the hosts, Puskás Akadémia 7–0 in the final. Among the seven Honvéd goals, Gergely Bobál scored 4 goals.

The 2014 Puskás Cup was won by Real Madrid by beating Puskás Akadémia 1–0 in the final at the Pancho Arena. This match coincided with the inauguration ceremony of the new football stadium in Felcsút. György Szöllősi, communication director of the Ferenc Puskás Football Academy, announced that there will be 4,500 spectators at the final of the 2014 Puskás Cup. Among the invited guests there will be the wife of Ferenc Puskás, the former Croatian football legend, Davor Šuker, the former German international and Hungary coach, Lothar Matthäus, former Videoton coach and Portugal international Paulo Sousa, and former Golden Team members Jenő Buzánszky and Gyula Grosics. The opening speech will be delivered by the president of the Hungarian Olympic Committee and former Hungarian MP Pál Schmitt and the president of the Spanish Football Federation, Ángel María Villar.

The 2015 Puskás Cup was won by Budapest Honvéd by beating three-time champions La Fábrica in the final on 6 April 2015 at the Pancho Arena in Felcsút. Hagi Academy finished third by beating Feyenoord Academy. The home side, Puskás Akadémia finished fifth by beating Panathinaikos 2–1.

Title-holders Budapest Honvéd won the 2016 Puskás Cup by beating the host club, Puskás Akadémia FC in the final in a penalty shoot-out. La Fabrica won the bronze medal by beating newcomers KRC Genk Jeugd in the third place play-off.

In 2024, Real Madrid beat Sporting CP 2–1 in the final.

On 1 April 2025, it was announced that a new team, Juventus, will compete for the Puskás Cup. On 5 May 2025, Juventus won the cup by beating Honvéd 2–0 in the final, while the SK Slavia Prague beat 2-1 Panathinaikos F.C. in the third place match.

On 3 May 2026, La Fabrica beat SK Slavia Praha 1-0 in the final, while KRC Genk Jeugd beat Panathinaikos 2-0 for the third place.

== Results ==
Year	Winners	Score	Runners-up	Third place	Score	Fourth place	Number of teams
2008	(Spain); Real Madrid	5–1	(Hungary); Puskás Akadémia	(Greece); Panathinaikos	1–0	(Hungary); Budapest Honvéd	4
2009	(Hungary); Ferencváros	2–1	(Hungary); Budapest Honvéd	(Spain); Real Madrid	3–2	(Slovakia); Slovan Bratislava	6
2010	(Hungary); Budapest Honvéd	2–0	(Greece); Panathinaikos	(Spain); Real Madrid	2–0	(Hungary); Ferencváros	6
2011	(Hungary); Budapest Honvéd	1–1 (p. 5–4)	(Spain); Real Madrid	(Greece); Panathinaikos	3–2	(Hungary); Puskás Akadémia	6
2012	(Hungary); Budapest Honvéd	7–0	(Hungary); Puskás Akadémia	Austria Wien	0–0 (p. 4–3)	(Greece); Panathinaikos	6
2013	(Spain); Real Madrid	2–0	(Greece); Panathinaikos	(Hungary); Budapest Honvéd	4–2	(Hungary); Puskás Akadémia	6
2014	(Spain); Real Madrid	1–0	(Hungary); Puskás Akadémia	(Croatia); Dinamo Zagreb	3–0	(Hungary); Budapest Honvéd	6
2015	(Hungary); Budapest Honvéd	2–2 (p. 3–1)	(Spain); La Fábrica	(Romania); Hagi Academy	1–0	(Netherlands); Feyenoord	6
2016	(Hungary); Budapest Honvéd	1–1 (p. 5–4)	(Hungary); Puskás Akadémia	(Spain); La Fábrica	3–0	(Belgium); Genk	6
2017	(Spain); Real Madrid	4–0	(Greece); Panathinaikos	(Hungary); Puskás Akadémia	1–1 (p. 7–6)	(Hungary); Budapest Honvéd	6
2018	(Belgium); Genk	3–1	(Hungary); Puskás Akadémia	(Brazil); Flamengo	2–1	(Portugal); Sporting	
2019	(Brazil); Flamengo	4–2	(Hungary); Puskás Akadémia	(Romania); Hagi Academy	4–0	(Greece); Panathinaikos	
2020	Postponed due to COVID-19						
2021	(Hungary); Puskás Akadémia	1–0	(Portugal); Sporting CP	(Hungary); Budapest Honvéd	3–0	(Croatia); Osijek	
2022	(Spain); Real Madrid	4–0	(Ukraine); Dinamo Kyiv	(Brazil); Flamengo	3–0	(Hungary); Puskás Akadémia	
2023	Postponed due to 2023 UEFA European Under-17 Championship						
2024	(Spain); Real Madrid	2–1	(Portugal); Sporting CP	(Italy); Juventus	1–1 (p. 4–2)	(Hungary); Puskás Akadémia	
2025	(Italy); Juventus	2–0	(Hungary); Budapest Honvéd	(Czech Republic); Slavia Prague	2–1	(Greece); Panathinaikos	
2026	(Spain); Real Madrid	1–0	(Czech Republic); Slavia Prague	(Belgium); Genk	2–0	(Greece); Panathinaikos	

== Statistics ==
=== Teams reaching the top four ===
Team	Titles	Runners-up	Third place	Fourth place	Top 4 finishes
(Spain) Real Madrid	7 (2008, 2013, 2014, 2017, 2022, 2024, 2026)	2 (2011, 2015)	3 (2009, 2010, 2016)	0	12
(Hungary) Budapest Honvéd	5 (2010, 2011, 2012, 2015, 2016)	2 (2009, 2025)	2 (2013, 2021)	3 (2008, 2014, 2017)	12
(Hungary) Puskás Akadémia	1 (2021)	6 (2008, 2012, 2014, 2016, 2018, 2019)	1 (2017)	4 (2011, 2013, 2022, 2024)	12
(Brazil) Flamengo	1 (2019)	0	2 (2018, 2022)	0	3
(Belgium) Genk	1 (2018)	0	1 (2026)	1 (2016)	3
(Italy) Juventus	1 (2025)	0	1 (2024)	0	2
(Hungary) Ferencváros	1 (2009)	0	0	1 (2010)	2
(Greece) Panathinaikos	0	3 (2010, 2013, 2017)	2 (2008, 2011)	4 (2012, 2019, 2025, 2026)	9
(Portugal) Sporting	0	2 (2021, 2024)	0	1 (2018)	3
(Czech Republic) Slavia Prague	0	1 (2026)	1 (2025)	0	2
(Ukraine) Dynamo Kyiv	0	1 (2022)	0	0	1
(Romania) Hagi Academy	0	0	2 (2015, 2019)	0	2
Austria Wien	0	0	1 (2012)	0	1
(Croatia) Dinamo Zagreb	0	0	1 (2014)	0	1
(Slovakia) Slovan Bratislava	0	0	0	1 (2009)	1
(Netherlands) Feyenoord	0	0	0	1 (2015)	1
(Croatia) Osijek	0	0	0	1 (2021)	1
