= 2009 Puskás Cup =

Puskás Suzuki Cup

Tournament details
- Host country: Hungary
- Dates: 10 June – 14 June
- Teams: 6 (from 1 confederation)
- Venue: 2 (in 2 host cities)

Final positions
- Champions: (Hungary) Ferencvárosi TC (1st title)
- Runners-up: (Hungary) Budapest Honvéd FC

The 2009 Puskás Cup was the second edition of the Puskás Cup and took place 2 April to 5 April. Ferencvárosi TC were the defending champions. Ferencvárosi TC won their first title by defeating Budapest Honvéd FC 2–1 in the final.

== Participating teams ==
- (Slovakia) ŠK Slovan Bratislava (invited)
- (Hungary) Budapest Honvéd FC (former club of Ferenc Puskás)
- (Hungary) Ferencvárosi TC (invited)
- (Greece) Panathinaikos F.C. (former club of Ferenc Puskás)
- (Hungary) Puskás Academy (host)
- (Spain) Real Madrid C.F. (former club of Ferenc Puskás)

== Venues ==
- Stadion Sóstói
- Felcsút

== Results ==
Key to colours in group tables
Advanced to the Final

Team	Pld	W	D	L	GF	GA	Pts
(Hungary) Budapest Honvéd	2	2	0	0	7	3	6
(Spain) Real Madrid	2	1	0	1	5	5	3
(Greece) Panathinaikos	2	0	0	2	1	5	0

Team	Pld	W	D	L	GF	GA	Pts
(Hungary) Ferencváros	2	1	1	0	2	1	4
(Slovakia) Slovan Bratislava	2	0	2	0	1	1	2
(Hungary) Puskás Academy	2	0	1	1	2	3	1

=== 5th place ===
(Hungary) Puskás Academy	0-2	(Greece) Panathinaikos

=== 3rd place ===
(Spain) Real Madrid	3-2	(Slovakia) Slovan Bratislava

=== Final ===
(Hungary) Ferencváros	2-1	(Hungary) Budapest Honvéd
