= 2013 Puskás Cup =

Puskás Suzuki Cup

Tournament details
- Host country: Hungary
- Dates: 29 March – 1 April
- Teams: 6 (from 2 confederations)
- Venues: 2 (in 2 host cities)

Final positions
- Champions: (Spain) Real Madrid (2nd title)
- Runners-up: (Greece) Panathinaikos

Tournament statistics
- Matches played: 9
- Goals scored: 26 (2.89 per match)

The 2013 Puskás Cup was the sixth edition of the Puskás Cup and took place 29 March to 1 April. Budapest Honvéd were the defending champions. Real Madrid won their second title by defeating Panathinaikos 2–0 in the final.

== Participating teams ==
- (Hungary) Budapest Honvéd (former club of Ferenc Puskás)
- (Romania) Hagi Football Academy (invited)
- (Australia) Melbourne Football Institute (invited)
- (Greece) Panathinaikos (former club of Ferenc Puskás)
- (Hungary) Puskás Akadémia (host)
- (Spain) Real Madrid (former club of Ferenc Puskás)

== Venues ==
- Stadion Sóstói
- Felcsút

== Results ==
All times are local (UTC+2).

=== Group A ===
| Team | Pld | W | D | L | GF | GA | GD | Pts |
|---|---|---|---|---|---|---|---|---|
| (Spain) Real Madrid | 2 | 1 | 1 | 0 | 1 | 1 | 0 | 4 |
| (Hungary) Puskás Akadémia | 2 | 1 | 1 | 0 | 1 | 1 | 0 | 4 |
| (Romania) Hagi Football Academy | 2 | 0 | 0 | 2 | 0 | 2 | −2 | 0 |

29 March 2013
17:45

| (Hungary) Puskás Akadémia | 1 – 0 | (Romania) Hagi Football Academy |

Stadion Sóstói, Székesfehérvár

30 March 2013
17:45

| (Hungary) Puskás Akadémia | 0 – 0 | (Spain) Real Madrid |

Stadion Sóstói, Székesfehérvár

31 March 2013
18:10

| (Spain) Real Madrid | 1 – 0 | (Romania) Hagi Football Academy |

Stadion Sóstói, Székesfehérvár

=== Group B ===
| Team | Pld | W | D | L | GF | GA | GD | Pts |
|---|---|---|---|---|---|---|---|---|
| (Greece) Panathinaikos | 2 | 2 | 0 | 0 | 7 | 1 | +6 | 6 |
| (Hungary) Budapest Honvéd | 2 | 1 | 0 | 1 | 3 | 2 | +1 | 3 |
| (Australia) Melbourne Football Institute | 2 | 0 | 0 | 2 | 0 | 7 | −7 | 0 |

29 March 2013
17:45

| (Hungary) Budapest Honvéd | 2 – 0 | (Australia) Melbourne Football Institute |

Stadion Sóstói, Székesfehérvár

30 March 2013
17:45

| (Greece) Panathinaikos | 2 – 1 | (Hungary) Budapest Honvéd |

Stadion Sóstói, Székesfehérvár

31 March 2013
18:10

| (Greece) Panathinaikos | 5 – 0 | (Australia) Melbourne Football Institute |

Stadion Sóstói, Székesfehérvár

=== Fifth place play-off ===
1 April 2013
13:00

| (Romania) Hagi Football Academy | 6 – 0 | (Australia) Melbourne Football Institute |

Stadion Sóstói, Székesfehérvár
