= Elliot Gómez =

Spanish footballer

Personal information
- Full name: Elliot Gómez López
- Date of birth: 11 June 1999 (age 27)
- Place of birth: Güímar, Spain
- Height: 1.77 m (5 ft 10 in)
- Position: Winger

Team information
- Current team: Sanjoanense
- Number: 17

Youth career
- 2005–2009: Güímar
- 2009–2010: Atlético Unión Güímar
- 2010–2013: Tenerife
- 2013–2018: Real Madrid

Senior career*
Years	Team	Apps	(Gls)
2018–2019	Real Madrid B	0	(0)
2018–2019	→ Burgos (loan)	7	(0)
2019–2020	Tenerife B	24	(6)
2019–2022	Tenerife	9	(0)
2020–2021	→ Valladolid B (loan)	11	(0)
2021–2022	→ Hércules (loan)	21	(1)
2022–2023	Compostela	19	(0)
2023	Peña Deportiva	1	(0)
2023–2024	Atlético Pulpileño	25	(4)
2024–2025	Los Llanos de Aridane	12	(0)
2025	UE Santa Coloma	4	(0)
2026–	Sanjoanense	2	(0)
- * Club domestic league appearances and goals as of 7 May 2026

Elliot Gómez López (born 11 June 1999) is a Spanish professional footballer who plays as a left winger for Portuguese club Sanjoanense.

== Club career ==
Born in Güímar, Tenerife, Canary Islands, Gómez joined Real Madrid's La Fábrica in 2013, from CD Tenerife. On 18 July 2018, after finishing his formation, he was loaned to Segunda División B side Burgos CF for the season.

Gómez made his senior debut on 25 August 2018, playing the last nine minutes in a 0–2 away loss against SD Ponferradina. The following 31 January, after just one start in seven appearances, his loan was cut short, and subsequently terminated his deal with Los Blancos. On 5 February 2019, he returned to his former club Tenerife, being assigned to the reserves in Tercera División.

Gómez made his professional debut on 22 November 2019, coming on as a late substitute for goalscorer Suso Santana in a 2–0 away defeat of Sporting de Gijón in the Segunda División championship. The following 10 June, he extended his contract until 2021.

On 2 October 2020, Gómez further extended his contract until 2023, and was immediately loaned to Real Valladolid Promesas in the third tier, for the season. The following 23 August, he moved to Segunda División RFEF side Hércules CF also in a temporary deal.
