= Georgios Kalafatis Sports Center =

Greek training facility

Coordinates: 37.9203°N 23.8342°E

- Interactive map of Georgios Kalafatis Sports Center
- Location: Koropi, Attica
- Owner: Panathinaikos F.C.
- Type: Sports facility

Construction
- Opened: 2013

Website
- Training Center "G. Kalafatis"

Georgios Kalafatis Sports Center is the training ground and academy base of the Greek football club Panathinaikos since 2013.

In 2013, Giannis Alafouzos, president of Panathinaikos F.C., decided the move of the club from the previous training center of Paiania to a new one, owned by the team. The ground was bought by the previous owner, Panionios F.C., and was named "Georgios Kalafatis" in honour of the founder of Panathinaikos.

Since then, it has been a gradual upgrade of the facilities.

== Facilities ==
- Fully refurbished and equipped gymnasium, Performance Lab, rehabilitation and physiotherapy room
- Restaurant for the athletes and the coaches, bar, lounge, recreation hall, dressing rooms, athletes accommodation, medical facilities, Academy and administration offices
- Professional team offices, meeting room and lounge
- Two floodlight football fields with natural grass turf
- One floodlight football field with artificial turf
- One floodlight 5x5 field
- One goalkeepers training area
- Tennis court
- Parking area
- Subsidiary offices
