= Kispest-Honvéd FC in European football =

Kispest-Honvéd Football Club is a professional football club based in Budapest, Hungary.

== Overall record ==
=== Overall record ===
Accurate as of 28 August 2020

Competition	Played	Won	Drew	Lost	GF	GA	GD	Win%
European Cup / Champions League	30	12	3	15	47	54	−7	40.00
Cup Winners' Cup	16	7	1	8	29	22	+7	43.75
UEFA Cup / UEFA Europa League	69	32	13	24	112	99	+13	46.38
UEFA Intertoto Cup	8	3	2	3	10	9	+1	37.50
Total	123	54	19	50	198	184	+14	43.90

Legend: GF = Goals For. GA = Goals Against. GD = Goal Difference.

== Matches ==
Season	Competition	Round	Club	Home	Away	Aggregate
1956–57	European Cup	1. Round	(Spain) Athletic Bilbao	3–3	2–3	5–6
1964–65	UEFA Cup Winners' Cup	1. Round	(Switzerland) Lausanne Sports	1–0	0–2	1–2
1965–66	UEFA Cup Winners' Cup	1. Round	(Finland) Reipas Lahti	6–0	10–2	16–2
1965–66	UEFA Cup Winners' Cup	2. Round	(Czechoslovakia) Dukla Prague	1–2	3–2	4–4 (a)
1965–66	UEFA Cup Winners' Cup	Quarter-finals	(England) Liverpool FC	0–0	0–2	0–2
1970–71	UEFA Cup Winners' Cup	1. Round	(Scotland) Aberdeen FC	1–3	3–1	4–4 (aet)
1970–71	UEFA Cup Winners' Cup	2. Round	(England) Manchester City	0–1	0–2	0–3
1972–73	UEFA Cup	1. Round	(Scotland) Partick Thistle FC	1–0	3–0	4–0
1972–73	UEFA Cup	2. Round	(Bulgaria) PFC Beroe Stara Zagora	1–0	0–3	1–3
1973–74	UEFA Cup	1. Round	(Czechoslovakia) FC Košice	5–2	0–1	5–3
1973–74	UEFA Cup	2. Round	(Bulgaria) PFC Lokomotiv Plovdiv	3–2	4–3	7–5
1973–74	UEFA Cup	3. Round	(Poland) Ruch Chorzów	2–0	0–5	2–5
1975–76	UEFA Cup	1. Round	(Czechoslovakia) FC Bohemians Praha	1–1	2–1	3–2
1975–76	UEFA Cup	2. Round	(East Germany) Dynamo Dresden	2–2	0–1	2–3
1976–77	UEFA Cup	1. Round	(Italy) Internazionale FC	1–1	1–0	2–1
1976–77	UEFA Cup	2. Round	(Soviet Union) FC Shakhtar Donetsk	2–3	0–3	2–6
1978–79	UEFA Cup	1. Round	(Turkey) Adanaspor	6–0	2–2	8–2
1978–79	UEFA Cup	2. Round	(Romania) Politehnica Timișoara	4–0	0–2	4–2
1978–79	UEFA Cup	3. Round	(Netherlands) Ajax Amsterdam	4–1	0–2	4–3
1978–79	UEFA Cup	Quarter-finals	(West Germany) MSV Duisburg	2–3	2–1	4–4 (a)
1980–81	European Cup	Preliminary Round	(Malta) Valletta FC	8–0	3–0	11–0
1980–81	European Cup	1. Round	(Portugal) Sporting CP	1–0	2–0	3–0
1980–81	European Cup	2. Round	(Spain) Real Madrid CF	0–2	0–1	0–3
1983–84	UEFA Cup	1. Round	(Greece) AEL	3–0	0–2	3–2 (aet)
1983–84	UEFA Cup	2. Round	(Socialist Federal Republic of Yugoslavia) Hajduk Split	3–2	0–3	3–5
1984–85	European Cup	1. Round	(Switzerland) Grasshopper FC	2–1	1–3	3–4
1985–86	European Cup	1. Round	(Republic of Ireland) Shamrock Rovers	2–0	3–1	5–1
1985–86	European Cup	2. Round	(Romania) FC Steaua București	1–0	1–4	2–4
1986–87	European Cup	1. Round	(Denmark) Brøndby IF	2–2	1–4	3–6
1987–88	UEFA Cup	1. Round	(Belgium) KSC Lokeren	1–0	0–0	1–0
1987–88	UEFA Cup	2. Round	(Portugal) Desportivo de Chaves	3–1	2–1	5–2
1987–88	UEFA Cup	3. Round	(Greece) Panathinaikos	5–2	1–5	6–7
1988–89	European Cup	1. Round	(Scotland) Celtic	1–0	0–4	1–4
1989–90	European Cup	1. Round	(Socialist Federal Republic of Yugoslavia) FK Vojvodina	1–0	1–2	2–2 (a)
1989–90	European Cup	2. Round	(Portugal) S.L. Benfica	0–2	0–7	0–9
1991–92	European Cup	1. Round	(Republic of Ireland) Dundalk FC	1–1	2–0	3–1
1991–92	European Cup	2. Round	(Italy) UC Sampdoria	2–1	1–3	3–4
1993–94	UEFA Champions League	1. Round	(England) Manchester United	2–3	1–2	3–5
1994–95	UEFA Cup	Preliminary Round	(Moldova) Zimbru Chişinău	4–1	1–0	5–1
1994–95	UEFA Cup	1. Round	(Netherlands) FC Twente	1–3	4–1	5–4
1994–95	UEFA Cup	2. Round	(Germany) Bayer Leverkusen	0–2	0–5	0–7
1996–97	UEFA Cup Winners' Cup	Qualifying Round	(North Macedonia) FK Sloga Jugomagnat	1–0	1–0	2–0
1996–97	UEFA Cup Winners' Cup	1. Round	(France) Nimes Olympique	1–2	1–3	2–5
2002	UEFA Intertoto Cup	1. Round	(Lithuania) FK Žalgiris Vilnius	0–1	0–0	0–1
2004–05	UEFA Cup	1. Qualifying Round	(Armenia) Mika	1–1	1–0	2–1
2004–05	UEFA Cup	2. Qualifying Round	(Poland) Amica Wronki	1–0	0–1	1–1 (p)
2007–08	UEFA Cup	1. Qualifying Round	(Moldova) FC Nistru Otaci	1–1	1–1	2–2 (p5–4)
2007–08	UEFA Cup	2. Qualifying Round	(Germany) Hamburger SV	0–0	0–4	0–4
2008	UEFA Intertoto Cup	1. Round	(Kazakhstan) FC Zhetysu	4–2	2–1	6–3
2008	UEFA Intertoto Cup	2. Round	(Czech Republic) FK Teplice	0–2	3–1	3–3 (a)
2008	UEFA Intertoto Cup	3. Round	(Austria) SK Sturm Graz	1–2	0–0	1–2
2009–10	UEFA Europa League	3. Qualifying Round	(Turkey) Fenerbahçe SK	1–1	1–5	2–6
2012–13	UEFA Europa League	1. Qualifying Round	(Albania) Flamurtari	2–0	1–0	3–0
2012–13	UEFA Europa League	2. Qualifying Round	(Russia) Anzhi Makhachkala	0–4	0–1	0–5
2013–14	UEFA Europa League	1. Qualifying Round	(Montenegro) FK Čelik Nikšić	9–0	4–1	13–1
2013–14	UEFA Europa League	2. Qualifying Round	(Serbia) Vojvodina	1–3	0–2	1–5
2017–18	UEFA Champions League	2. Qualifying Round	(Israel) Hapoel Be'er Sheva	2–3	1–2	3–5
2018–19	UEFA Europa League	1. Qualifying Round	(North Macedonia) Rabotnički	4−0	1−2	5−2
2018–19	UEFA Europa League	2. Qualifying Round	(Luxembourg) Progrès Niederkorn	1–0	0−2	1−2
2019–20	UEFA Europa League	1. Qualifying Round	(Lithuania) Žalgiris	3–1	1–1	4–2
2019–20	UEFA Europa League	2. Qualifying Round	(Romania) Universitatea Craiova	0–0	0–0	0–0 (p1–3)
2020–21	UEFA Europa League	1. Qualifying Round	(Finland) Inter Turku	2–1 (aet)	—N/a	—N/a
2020–21	UEFA Europa League	2. Qualifying Round	(Sweden) Malmö FF	0−2	—N/a	—N/a
