= László István Mészáros =

László István Mészáros is the current mayor of Felcsút, Hungary. He assumed office on August 12, 2018, when he won the position of mayor during a special by-election triggered by the resignation of his predecessor, Lőrinc Mészáros.
