= 2010 Puskás Cup =

Puskás Suzuki Cup

Tournament details
- Host country: Hungary
- Dates: 2 April – 5 April
- Teams: 6 (from 1 confederation)
- Venue: 2 (in 2 host cities)

Final positions
- Champions: (Hungary) Budapest Honvéd FC (1st title)
- Runners-up: (Greece) Panathinaikos F.C.

The 2010 Puskás Cup was the third edition of the Puskás Cup and took place 2 April to 5 April. Ferencvárosi TC were the defending champions. Budapest Honvéd FC won their first title by defeating Panathinaikos F.C. 2–0 in the final.

== Participating teams ==
- (Italy) Milan (invited)
- (Hungary) Budapest Honvéd (former club of Ferenc Puskás)
- (Hungary) Ferencváros (invited)
- (Greece) Panathinaikos (former club of Ferenc Puskás)
- (Hungary) Puskás Academy (host)
- (Spain) Real Madrid (former club of Ferenc Puskás)

== Venues ==
- Stadion Sóstói
- Felcsút

== Results ==
All times are local (UTC+2).

Key to colours in group tables
Advanced to the Final

Team	Pld	W	D	L	GF	GA	Pts
(Greece) Panathinaikos	2	1	1	0	4	2	4
(Spain) Real Madrid	2	1	1	0	4	2	4
(Hungary) Puskás Academy	2	0	0	0	4	8	0

Team	Pld	W	D	L	GF	GA	Pts
(Hungary) Budapest Honvéd	2	1	1	0	6	2	4
(Hungary) Ferencváros	2	1	1	0	3	7	4
(Italy) AC Milan	2	0	1	1	2	3	1

=== 5th place ===
(Hungary) Puskás Academy	2-2	(Italy) AC Milan

=== 3rd place ===
(Spain) Real Madrid	2–0	(Hungary) Ferencváros

=== Final ===
(Greece) Panathinaikos	0–2	(Hungary) Budapest Honvéd
