= La Fábrica (Real Madrid) =

General information
- Type: Farm system
- Location: Madrid, Spain
- Current tenants: Real Madrid Castilla; Real Madrid C Real Madrid Youth
- Groundbreaking: 1942
- Renovated: 2005
- Renovation cost: €100 million
- Owner: Real Madrid

Website
- www.realmadrid.com/futbol/cantera

La Fábrica ("The Factory") is the name given to Real Madrid's farm system and academy. La Fábrica has produced a number of players that have contributed to Real Madrid's sustained sporting success since its inception.

La Fábrica is housed in Ciudad Real Madrid, Real Madrid's training facility located in Valdebebas.

== History ==
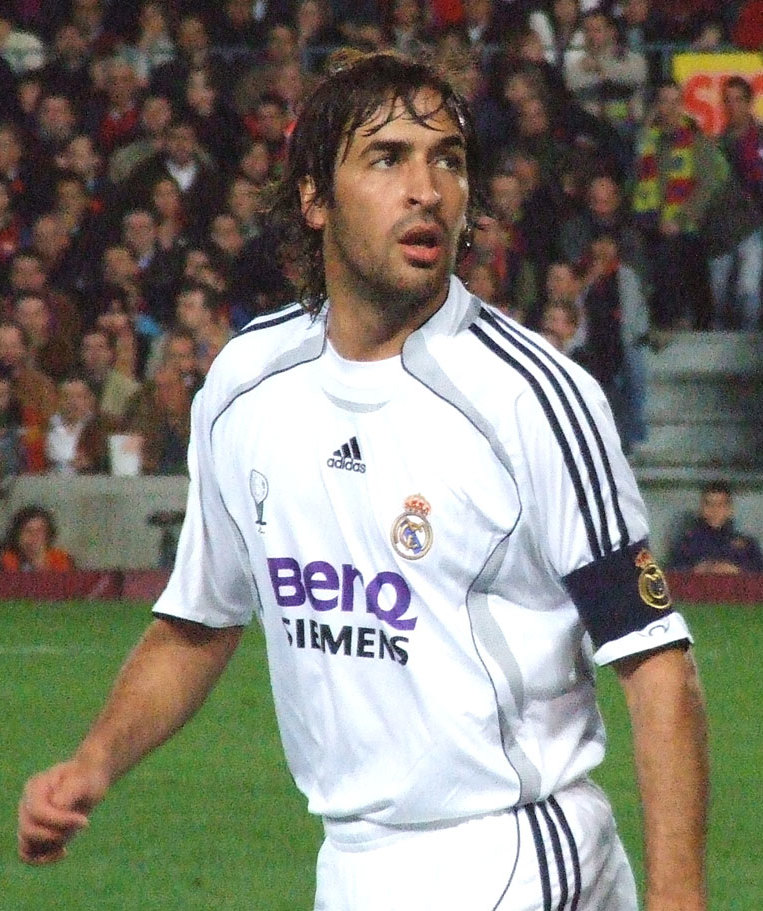
Former captain and Real Madrid's player with the highest number of appearances, Raúl, is a La Fábrica alumnus.

In 1942, AD Plus Ultra, a local Madrid club then in the Spanish Third Division, agreed to become Real Madrid's feeder club in return for financial support. In 1972, AD Plus Ultra became Real's official reserve team, known today as Real Madrid Castilla. RM Castilla is the most successful reserve side in the history of Spanish football, having amassed more points as of 2020 in the Spanish Second Division than any other reserve side. In 1980, RM Castilla even reached the final of the Copa del Rey, Spain's premier domestic cup competition, where they lost the title to Real Madrid's first team squad.

Similarly, in the 1950s, Real Madrid Aficionados (English: Real Madrid Amateurs) was formed as an amateur competitive team affiliated with Real Madrid. That club eventually became Real Madrid C, and served as Real's second reserve team – after RM Castilla – until the team was disbanded in 2015.

The youth academy system itself was established and developed in the 1950s by former Real Madrid Aficionados player Miguel Malbo under the tutelage of the then-Real Madrid president, Santiago Bernabéu. Malbo went on to serve as Director of La Fábrica for over 50 years. Isidoro San José, former Real Madrid player, La Fábrica alumnus and deputy director at La Fábrica, said of Malbo's legacy at Real Madrid, "In his day, he was one of the people that contributed most to Real Madrid, and to Madrid's cantera."

Since its beginnings in the 1950s, countless players have progressed through the ranks of La Fábrica's youth academy, and some of these graduates have contributed to Real Madrid's formidable sporting success both domestically and internationally. Some periods of success are particularly noteworthy. Between 1955 and 1965, Real Madrid won eight La Liga titles, one Copa del Rey and six UEFA Champions Leagues. A number of La Fábrica graduates contributed to Real's success in these years, including Pedro Casado, Enrique Mateos, Gregorio Benito, Juan Santisteban, Manuel Velázquez, Ramón Grosso, Fernando Serena and Ramón Marsal.

Moreover, in the 1980s Real Madrid won five consecutive La Liga titles, two consecutive UEFA Europa Leagues (then known as the UEFA Cup), and reached three consecutive Champions League (then known as the European Cup) semi-finals with a squad composed mostly of players formed at La Fábrica, also known as La Quinta del Buitre. This batch of "homegrown" Real Madrid players included Emilio Butragueño, Chendo, Manolo Sanchís, Ricardo Gallego, Míchel, Sebastián Losada, Miguel Pardeza and Rafael Martín Vázquez.

== Organization ==
Real Madrid Castilla is a fully professional team; all other teams at La Fábrica are youth teams including everything from under-19-year-olds to under-6-year-olds. Each youth team competes in a league of its own. Youth players must aspire to progress through the ranks if they wish to eventually debut in Real's first-team squad. La Fábrica has more than 270 youth players spread across all 16 youth teams.

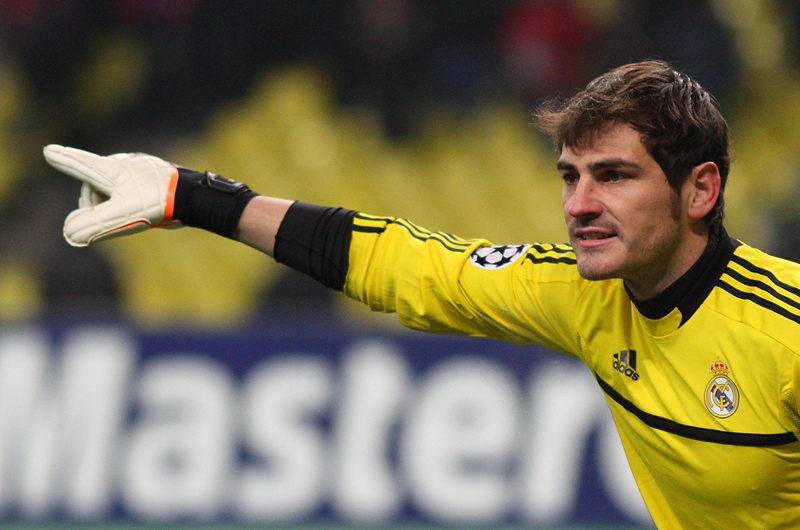
Iker Casillas, considered by some to be the best goalkeeper of his generation and a five-time consecutive winner of FIFA/FIFPro World's Best Goalkeeper Award, is also a La Fábrica graduate.

Squad	Head Coach	League
Real Madrid Castilla	Julián López de Lerma	Primera Federación (Gr. 1)
Real Madrid C	Víctor Cea	Segunda Federación (Gr. 5)
Juvenil A	Álvaro López	División de Honor (Gr. 5)
Juvenil B	Alfonso Berenguer	Liga Nacional (Gr. 12)
Juvenil C	Santiago Palacios	Primera División Autonómica (Gr. 1)
Cadete A	Carlos Cura	Superliga
Cadete B		División de Honor (Gr. 1)
Infantil A	Alberto Madrid	Superliga
Infantil B	Juan Carlos Duque	División de Honor (Gr. 1)
Alevín A	Mario Madrid	Superliga
Alevín B	Mario Seguido	División de Honor (Gr. 1)
Alevín C	Rubén Barrios	División de Honor (Gr. 2)
Benjamín A	José Rubido	Division de Honor (Gr. 4)
Benjamín B	Víctor Carvajal	Division de Honor (Gr. 3)
Prebenjamín A	Javier Rubio	Primera División Autonómica (Gr. 4)
Prebenjamín B	Raúl Rubia	Primera División Autonómica (Gr. 5)
Debutante	Juan Carlos Juárez	Internship
