= Gheorghe Hagi Football Academy =

Football youth academy based in Ovidiu, Constanța County, Romania

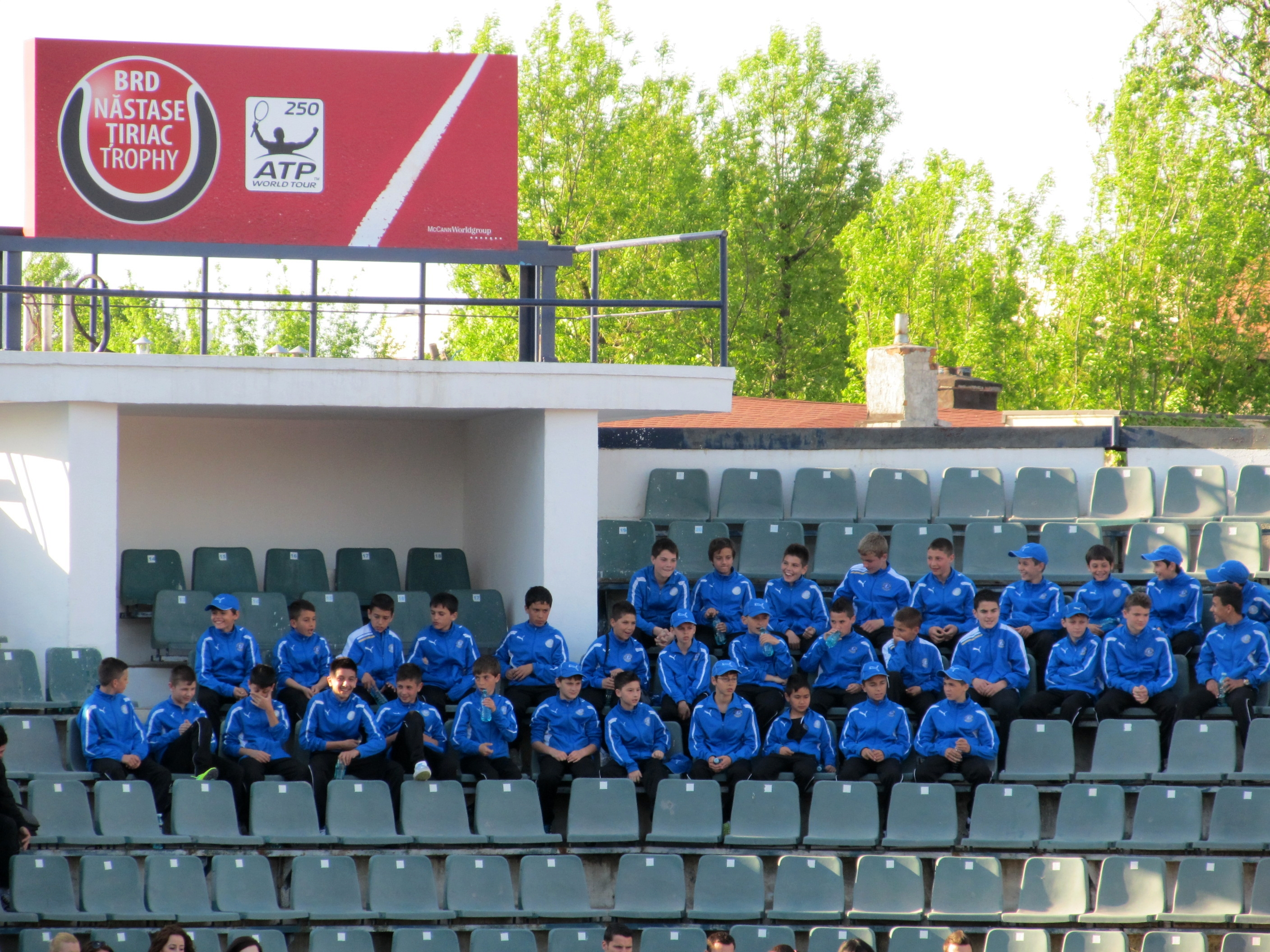
Gheorghe Hagi Football Academy players attending the 2012 BRD Năstase Țiriac Trophy

The Gheorghe Hagi Football Academy (Romanian: Academia de fotbal Gheorghe Hagi) is a football youth academy based in Ovidiu, Constanța County, which serves as the primary youth clinic of Romanian club Farul Constanța. Until 2021, it was the primary youth clinic of Viitorul Constanța.

Founded in 2009 by former Romanian international Gheorghe Hagi, the academy cost €11 million and is one of the biggest and most modern in Southeastern Europe, holding over 300 players, 9 training fields and other facilities.

The president of the Academy is Pavel Peniu and vice president is Neculai Tănasă.

== Notable former players ==
1990–1995

- (Romania) Romario Benzar
- (Romania) Alin Cârstocea
- (Romania) Gabriel Iancu
- (Romania) Bogdan Țîru
- (North Macedonia) Boban Nikolov
- (Romania) Florin Tănase
- (Romania) Mihai Bălașa
- (Romania) Ionuț Vînă
- (Romania) Alexandru Mitriță

1996–1998

- (Romania) Răzvan Marin
- (Romania) Cristian Manea
- (Romania) Dragoș Nedelcu
- (Romania) Alexandru Cicâldău
- (Romania) Ianis Hagi
- (Romania) Florinel Coman
- (Romania) Andrei Ciobanu
- (Romania) Virgil Ghiță
- (Romania) Tiberiu Căpușă

1999–2001

- (Romania) Tudor Băluță
- (Romania) Alexandru Mățan
- (Romania) Denis Drăguș
- (Romania) Radu Boboc

2002–2007

- (Romania) Louis Munteanu
- (Romania) Adrian Mazilu
- (Romania) Eduard Radaslavescu
- (Romania) Andrei Borza
- (Romania) Constantin Grameni
- (Romania) Alexi Pitu
- (Romania) Enes Sali
- (Romania) Alexandru Stoian

== Honours ==
=== Leagues ===
- Liga Elitelor U19
  - Winners (4): 2015–16, 2017–18, 2018–19, 2019-20
- Liga Elitelor U17
  - Winners (5): 2015–16, 2017–18, 2018–19, 2020-21, 2024-2025

=== Cups ===
- Cupa României U19
  - Winners (1): 2016–17
  - Runners-up (1): 2018–19
- Cupa României U19
  - Winners (1): 2017–18
  - Runners-up (2): 2015–16, 2018–19
- Romanian Supercup U19
  - Winners (2): 2018, 2019
  - Runners-up (2): 2016, 2017
- Romanian Supercup U17
  - Winners (2): 2016, 2019
  - Runners-up (1): 2018
- Puskás Cup:
  - Third place (1): 2015
