= Kispest-Honvéd FC =

Sports club in Hungary

Kispest-Honvéd
- Full name: Kispest-Honvéd Football Club
- Nicknames: Kispest; Oroszlánok (Lions)
- Founded: 3 August 1909; 117 years ago
- Stadium: Bozsik Aréna
- Capacity: 8,200
- Owner: Tamás Lisztinger
- President: Péter Szijjártó
- Head coach: Maurizio Jacobacci
- League: NB I
- 2025–26: NB II, 2nd of 16 (promoted)
- Website: honvedfc.hu
Home colours	Away colours	Third colours

Kispest-Honvéd Football Club (Hungarian pronunciation: [ˈkiʃpɛʃt ˈhonveːd ˈɛft͡seː]), commonly known as Kispest-Honvéd or simply Honvéd, is a Hungarian sports club based in Kispest, Budapest, with the colours of red and black. The club is best known for its football team. Honvéd means the Homeland Defence. Originally formed as Kispest AC, they became Kispest FC in 1926 before reverting to their original name in 1944.

The team enjoyed a golden age during the 1950s when it was renamed Budapesti Honvéd SE and became the Hungarian Army team. The club's top players from this era, Ferenc Puskás, Sándor Kocsis, József Bozsik, Zoltán Czibor, and Gyula Grosics helped the club win the Hungarian League four times during the 1950s and also formed the nucleus of the legendary Hungary national team popularly known as the Mighty Magyars.

During the 1980s and early 1990s, the club enjoyed another successful period, winning a further eight Hungarian League titles. They also won league and cup doubles in 1985 and 1989. In 1991, the club was renamed Kispest Honvéd FC and adopted its current name in 2003.

When the club was originally formed in 1909, it also organised teams that competed in fencing, cycling, gymnastics, wrestling, athletics, boxing, and tennis. Later, the Honvéd family was extended to include a water polo team, now known as Groupama Honvéd, a 33-times basketball-champion team and a handball team that were European Champions in 1982.

== History ==
Budapest Honvéd FC were founded in 1909 as Kispesti AC. At domestic level they first entered the Nemzeti Bajnokság I in the 1916–17 season. Their first success came in the 1926 Magyar Kupa season when they beat Budapesti EAC in the final. The club had played in the first division since 1916, until the club got relegated to the second division in 2003.

== Stadium ==
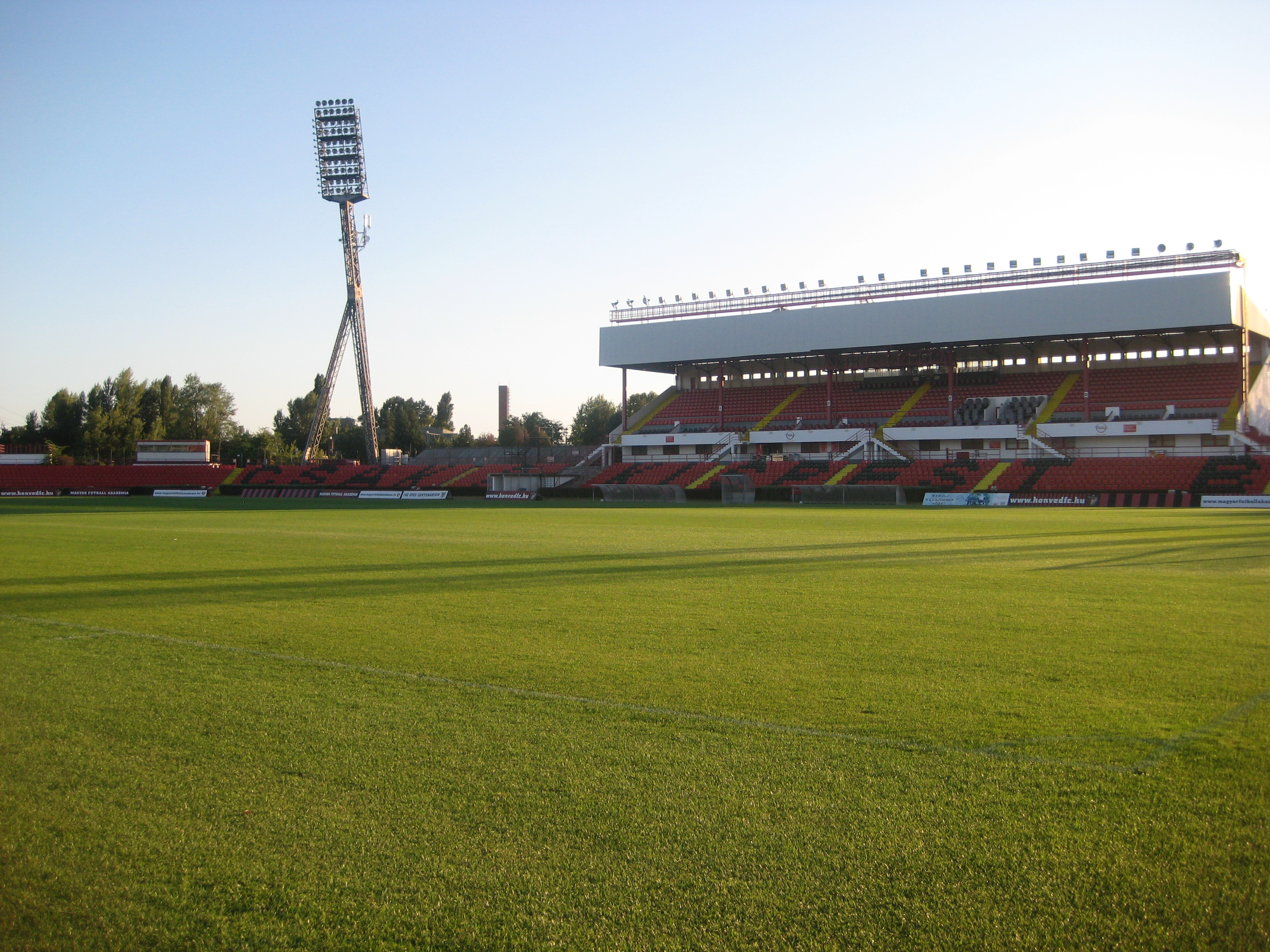
The first stadium was demolished in 2019

Budapest Honvéd's first stadium was opened in 1913. On 5 August 2018, the last match was played at the stadium. The match was won by Honvéd against Paksi FC on the 3rd match day of the 2018–19 Nemzeti Bajnokság I. The only goal was scored by Danilo in the 48th minute. The referee was Viktor Kassai. The stadium was demolished in 2019.

The new stadium of the club was opened in 2021. The first match was played between Budapest Honvéd FC II and Szekszárdi UFC in the 2020–21 Nemzeti Bajnokság III season. The stadium was selected to host the 2021 UEFA European Under-21 Championship.

== Crest and colours ==
Budapest Honvéd FC crest during the Hemingway era, used until 2020.

=== Naming history ===
- 1909–1926: Kispesti Athlétikai Club
- 1926–1944: Kispest FC
- 1944–1949: Kispesti AC
- 1949–1950: Honvéd Sport Egyesület
- 1950–1991: Budapesti Honvéd Sport Egyesület
- 1991–1996: Kispest-Honvéd FC
- 1996: Kispest-Honvéd TIG FC
- 1996–2003: Kispest-Honvéd Football Club
- 2003–2026: Budapest Honvéd Futball Club
- 2026–present: Kispest Honvéd FC

=== Manufacturers and shirt sponsors ===
The following table shows in detail Budapest Honvéd FC kit manufacturers and shirt sponsors by year:

Period	Kit manufacturer	Shirt sponsor
1990–1992	Adidas	Fiat
1992–1994	Matchwinner	Epson
1994–1996	Diadora	Gösser
1996–1997	Joma	Gösser
1997–1998	Joma	Faragó és Fiai Mystery
1998–2000	Umbro	IBUSZ alapítása 1902
2000–2003	Jako	Wilkinson Sword
2003–2005	Gems	–
2005–2006	Macron	–
2006–2008	hummel	–
2008–2012	Nike	–
2012–2013	Givova	–
2014	Givova	Ideasport
2014–2015	Givova	–
2015–18	Macron	–
2018–	Macron	Tippmix

== Honours ==
- Nemzeti Bajnokság I
  - Winners (14): 1949–50, 1950, 1952, 1954, 1955, 1979–80, 1983–84, 1984–85, 1985–86, 1987–88, 1988–89, 1990–91, 1992–93, 2016–17
- Nemzeti Bajnokság II
  - Winners (1): 2003–04
- Magyar Kupa
  - Winners (8): 1925–26, 1964, 1984–85, 1988–89, 1995–96, 2006–07, 2008–09, 2019–20
- UEFA Cup
  - Quarter final (1): 1978–79
- Mitropa Cup
  - Winners (1): 1959

=== Friendly ===
- Tournoi de Pâques du Red Star
  - Winners (1): 1932
- Trofeo Ciudad de Vigo
  - Winners (1): 1974

=== Youth teams ===
- Puskás Cup:
  - Winners (5): 2010, 2011, 2012, 2015, 2016

== Seasons ==
=== League positions ===
As of 12 July 2025

- In 2003–04 the second tier league called NB I/B.

== Players ==
=== Current squad ===
As of 22 September 2026

Note: Flags indicate national team as defined under FIFA eligibility rules; some limited exceptions apply. Players may hold more than one non-FIFA nationality.

No.	Pos.	Nation	Player
1	GK	HUN	Gellért Dúzs
3	DF	ESP	Pablo García
4	DF	HUN	Alex Szabó
5	DF	HUN	Dominik Csontos
7	FW	HUN	Ákos Zuigéber
8	MF	HUN	Ádám Somogyi
11	DF	HUN	Szilveszter Hangya
15	DF	HUN	Bonifác Csonka
17	FW	SVK	Patrik Pinte
19	FW	BIH	Adi Alić
20	MF	ESP	Asier García
30	MF	HUN	Tamás Somogyi
31	GK	BIH	Osman Hadžikić

No.	Pos.	Nation	Player
33	DF	UKR	Oleksandr Safronov
40	MF	HUN	Ádám Szamosi
44	DF	HUN	Ákos Baki
45	FW	ESP	Alberto Marí
49	DF	SRB	Branko Pauljević
52	DF	ROU	Deian Boldor
71	FW	HUN	Kevin Kántor
72	DF	HUN	Kevin Kállai
77	DF	HUN	Bence Varga
80	MF	MAR	Reda Eddarraj
83	GK	SVK	Tomáš Tujvel
91	FW	HUN	Ádám Gyurcsó
99	MF	HUN	István Pekár

=== Out on loan ===
Note: Flags indicate national team as defined under FIFA eligibility rules; some limited exceptions apply. Players may hold more than one non-FIFA nationality.

No.	Pos.	Nation	Player

=== Retired numbers ===
10 – (Hungary) Ferenc Puskás, Forward (1949–56). Number retired in July 2000.

=== Notable former players ===
Had senior international cap(s) for their respective countries. Players whose name is listed in bold represented their countries while playing for Budapest Honvéd FC.

- (Ivory Coast) Abraham
- (Hungary) **József Andrusch**
- (Ivory Coast) **Benjamin Angoua**
- (Hungary) **Zsolt Bárányos**
- (Hungary) **Balázs Bérczy**
- (Hungary) **Bertalan Bicskei**
- (Hungary) **János Biri**
- (Serbia and Montenegro) Igor Bogdanović
- (Hungary) **József Bozsik**
- (New Zealand) Kris Bright
- (Hungary) István Brockhauser
- (Hungary) **László Budai**
- (Hungary) Gábor Bukrán
- (Sierra Leone) Alfi Conteh-Lacalle
- (Hungary) Aurél Csertői
- (Hungary) **Zoltán Czibor**
- (Hungary) **László Dajka**
- (Hungary) **András Debreceni**
- (Hungary) **Lajos Détári**
- (Mali) Mamadou Diakité
- (Hungary) **László Disztl**
- (Hungary) **Péter Disztl**
- (Romania) Cristian Dulca
- (Hungary) **József Duró**
- (Hungary) József Eisenhoffer
- (Hungary) **Gábor Egressy**
- (Hungary) **Márton Esterházy**
- (Nigeria) Emeka Ezeugo
- (Hungary) László Farkasházy
- (Hungary) Pál Fischer
- (Hungary) **Imre Garaba**
- (Mozambique) **Genito**
- (Bulgaria) Ivo Georgiev
- (Hungary) **Gyula Grosics**
- (Hungary) **Sándor Gujdár**
- (Bosnia and Herzegovina) Emir Hadžić
- (Hungary) Gábor Halmai
- (Hungary) **István Hamar**
- (Hungary) Zoltán Hercegfalvi
- (Hungary) Ádám Hrepka
- (Hungary) János Hrutka
- (Nigeria) **Harmony Ikande**
- (Hungary) **Béla Illés**
- (Hungary) Péter Kabát
- (Hungary) **Mihály Kincses**
- (Hungary) **István Kocsis**
- (Hungary) **Lajos Kocsis**
- (Hungary) **Sándor Kocsis**
- (Hungary) **Imre Komora**
- (Hungary) **Antal Kotász**
- (Hungary) Béla Kovács
- (Hungary) **Ervin Kovács**
- (Hungary) **Kálmán Kovács**
- (Hungary) **Mihály Kozma**
- (Hungary) László Kuti
- (Italy) Davide Lanzafame
- (Mozambique) **Almiro Lobo**
- (Hungary) **Gyula Lóránt**
- (Zambia) **Misheck Lungu**
- (Hungary) **Ferenc Machos**
- (Hungary) **János Marozsán**
- (Hungary) **Gábor Márton**
- (Hungary) János Mátyus
- (Hungary) **József Mészáros**
- (Hungary) Vasile Miriuță
- (Mozambique) Hélder Muianga
- (Hungary) **Antal Nagy (1944)**
- (Hungary) **Antal Nagy (1956)**
- (Hungary) Norbert Németh
- (Hungary) **István Nyers**
- (Hungary) **Sándor Pintér**
- (Hungary) **István Pisont**
- (Hungary) **Attila Plókai**
- (Hungary) **Ferenc Puskás**
- (Hungary) **László Pusztai**
- (Hungary) **István Sallói**
- (Hungary) **Ferenc Sipos**
- (Hungary) **Lajos Szűcs**
- (Hungary) Ákos Takács
- (Hungary) **Zoltán Takács**
- (Hungary) **Lajos Tichy**
- (Hungary) Sándor Torghelle
- (Hungary) Mihály Tóth
- (Hungary) **József Varga**
- (Hungary) Gábor Vincze
- (Hungary) **István Vincze**
- (Peru) Paulo Albarracín
- (Peru) Bruno Enríquez
- (Peru) César Mayuri
- (Serbia) Dragan Vukmir
- (Czech Republic) Lukáš Zelenka
- (Hungary) Zalán Zombori
- (Liberia) Philip Tarlue

== Non-playing staff ==
=== Management ===
As of 15 September 2024

Position	Name
President	(Hungary) Péter Szijjártó
Managing Director	(Hungary) Árpád Séllei
Director of Sports	(Hungary) Sándor Fórizs
Director of Facility	(Hungary) Dávid Szabó
Director of Finance	(Hungary) Mária Takács
Director of Communications	(Hungary) Benedek Rác

=== First team staff ===
As of 6 June 2025

Position	Name
Head coach	(Italy) Maurizio Jacobacci
Assistant coach	(Hungary) István Márton
Assistant coach	(Hungary) István Paulik
Goalkeeping coach	(Hungary) István Brockhauser
Fitness coach	(Hungary) Péter Tepliczky
Physiotherapist	(Hungary) Fanni Máriás

== Ownership ==
In 2022, Chris Docherty was appointed as the new sport director of the club.

Chris Docherty said in an interview that the club cannot sign any new players for financial problems in the middle of the 2022-23 Nemzeti Bajnokság I season.

On 22 May 2023, Chris Docherty resigned as sports director. In an article published by Nemzeti Sport, George F. Hemingway, former owner of the club, heavily criticized the management of the club for their relegation to the Nemzeti Bajnokság II after finishing 11th in the 2022–23 Nemzeti Bajnokság I season. Hemingway said that the solid financial background is not enough if there is no expertise.

On 27 April 2024, it was revealed that a Tamás Lisztinger-led business showed interest in purchasing the club.

=== Owners ===
- 2006–2019: (United States) Quinex America LLC (George F. Hemingway)
- 2019–2024: (Hungary) Reditus Equity (Zoltán Bozó)
- 2024-present: (Hungary) ARAGO-SPORT Kft. (Tamás Leisztinger)

== Supporters ==
Budapest Honvéd FC has been repeatedly sanctioned by UEFA and the Hungarian Football Association for racist chanting by their ultras supporters. In October 2022, Honvéd supporters made racist monkey noises against several opposition players during a match with Zalaegerszegi TE. Subsequently, the Hungarian FA suspended the Zalaegerszegi TE manager Ricardo Moniz for trying to take his team off the pitch in protest. The Honvéd manager Tam Courts also subsequently stepped down over racism of the club's own supporters.

== See also ==
- History of Budapest Honvéd FC
- List of Budapest Honvéd FC seasons
- Budapest Honvéd FC in European football
- List of Budapest Honvéd FC managers

== Sources ==
- Behind The Curtain – Travels in Eastern European Football: Jonathan Wilson (2006)
- 50 Years of the European Cup and Champions League: Keir Radnedge (2005)
