= Felcsút =

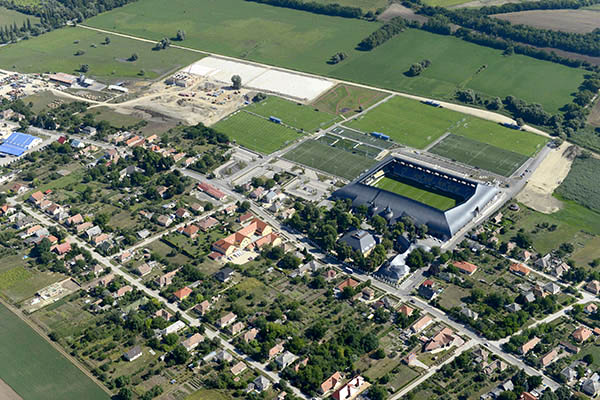
- Aerial view

- Coat of arms

- Location of Felcsút
- Coordinates: 47.45553°N 18.58477°E
- Country: Hungary
- County: Fejér

Government
  - Type: Mayor-Council
  - Body: Felcsút Village Council
  - Mayor: László István Mészáros (Fidesz)

Area
  - Total: 22.02 km^{2} (8.50 sq mi)

Population (2025)
  - Total: 2,014 ▲
  - Density: 76.65/km^{2} (198.5/sq mi)
- Time zone: UTC+1 (CET)
  - Summer (DST): UTC+2 (CEST)
- Postal code: 8086
- Area code: 22
- Website: felcsut.hu

Felcsút is a village in Fejér county, Hungary.

== History ==
The village was first mentioned in 1269 where its name was originated from the personal name "Csút". ("fel-" ["felső"] means "upper" in Hungarian.) In the Middle Ages the owners were crusaders from Székesfehérvár and in the 15th century became property of the Pálos rend.

Owners and inhabitants were often changed between the 16th century and 19th century.

The Roman Catholic church was built in classicist style between 1828 and 1840, and the Reformed church was finished by 1895.

A big change was the building of the railway which connected the village to the rest of the country, which was discontinued since.

On 15 November 2023, the UEFA Euro 2024 qualifier game Israel-Switzerland took place in Felcsút, partly due to then-time Gaza war.

== Economy ==
In 2009 Felcsút became the richest Hungarian settlement by capita (171 092 HUF), pushing the 2nd and 12th districts of Budapest to second and third place. In 2008, Felcsút stood in 336th place.

The development of Felcsút is a pet project of the prime minister Viktor Orbán, who grew up in the area. During Orbán's tenure as PM, several building projects were initiated or completed in the village, including Pancho Arena, a football stadium next to a property owned by Orbán, which was built in 2014 (the stadium has 3,900 seats, which is more than double of Felcsút's population), and a narrow-gauge railway line, planned to be completed by 2019. In early 2014 plans of construction of a new airport were reported, these rumors turned out to be false, as the building permit posted on the local government's website is of an earlier date and refers to an already existing airport, owned by Péter Besenyei.

== See also ==
- Pancho Arena
