= 2021–22 Panathinaikos F.C. season =

Panathinaikos
2021–22 season
- Chairman: Manos Mavrokoukoulakis
- Manager: Ivan Jovanović
- Stadium: Leoforos Alexandras Stadium
- Super League: 4th
- Greek Cup: Winners (19)
- Top goalscorer: League: Sebastián Palacios (11); All: Sebastián Palacios (13)
Home colours	Away colours	Third colours

The 2021–22 Panathinaikos season is the club's 63rd consecutive season in Super League Greece. They also compete in the Greek Cup.

On 21 May 2022, Panathinaikos defeated PAOK in the Greek Cup Final to win the domestic cup for the 19th time in club's history.

== Players ==
=== Current squad ===
As of 13 February 2022

No.	Name	Nationality	Position (s)	Date of birth (age)	Signed from	Notes
Goalkeepers
1	Sokratis Dioudis	(Greece)	GK	3 February 1993 (age 33)	(Greece) Aris	
15	Vasilios Xenopoulos	(Greece)	GK	20 April 1998 (age 28)	Youth system	
68	Nikos Christogeorgos	(Greece)	GK	18 January 2000 (age 26)	Youth system	
91	Alberto Brignoli	(Italy)	GK	19 August 1991 (age 35)	(Italy) Empoli	
Defenders
2	Georgios Vagiannidis	(Greece)	RB / RM	12 September 2001 (age 25)	(Italy) Inter Milan	
3	Juankar	(Spain)	LB / LM	30 March 1990 (age 36)	(Spain) Málaga	
4	Fran Vélez	(Spain)	CB	23 June 1991 (age 35)	(Greece) Aris Thessaloniki	
5	Bart Schenkeveld	(Netherlands)	CB	28 August 1991 (age 35)	(Australia) Melbourne City	
12	Ilias Chatzitheodoridis	(Greece)	LB / LM	5 December 1997 (age 28)	(England) Brentford	
14	Facundo Sánchez	(Argentina)	RB	7 March 1990 (age 36)	(Argentina) Estudiantes	
24	Georgios Sideras	(Greece)	CB	30 May 2002 (age 24)	Youth system	
27	Giannis Kotsiras	(Greece)	RB / RM	16 December 1992 (age 33)	(Greece) Asteras Tripolis	
31	Zvonimir Šarlija	(Croatia)	CB	29 August 1996 (age 30)	(Turkey) Ankaragücü	
44	Achilleas Poungouras	(Greece)	CB	13 December 1995 (age 30)	(Greece) PAOK	
Midfielders
6	Sotiris Alexandropoulos	(Greece)	DM / MF	26 November 2001 (age 24)	Youth system	
8	Yassin Ayoub	(Morocco)	MF	6 March 1994 (age 32)	(Netherlands) Feyenoord	
11	Anastasios Chatzigiovanis	(Greece)	RW / LW	31 May 1997 (age 29)	Youth system	
16	Ramon Pascal Lundqvist	(Sweden)	MF	10 May 1997 (age 29)	(Netherlands) Groningen	On loan + option to purchase
17	Rubén Pérez	(Spain)	DM / MF	26 April 1989 (age 37)	(Spain) Leganés	
19	Lucas Villafáñez	(Argentina)	MF / RW	4 October 1991 (age 35)	(Mexico) Atlético Morelia	
20	Dimitris Serpezis	(Greece)	MF	14 March 2001 (age 25)	Youth system	
21	Dimitrios Kourbelis	(Greece)	DM / CB	2 October 1993 (age 33)	(Greece) Asteras Tripolis	
22	Aitor Cantalapiedra	(Spain)	RW / LW	10 February 1996 (age 30)	(Netherlands) Twente	
34	Sebastián Palacios	(Argentina)	RW	20 January 1992 (age 34)	Independiente	
37	Andreas Athanasakopoulos	(Greece)	MF	27 November 2001 (age 24)	Youth system	
50	Mijat Gaćinović	(Serbia)	MF	8 February 1995 (age 31)	(Germany) 1899 Hoffenheim	On loan
57	Uffe Bech	(Denmark)	RW / LW	13 January 1993 (age 33)	(Germany) Hannover 96	
88	Maurício	(Brazil)	MF	21 October 1988 (age 38)	(Greece) PAOK	
98	Mateus Vital	(Brazil)	MF / LW	12 October 1998 (age 28)	(Brazil) Corinthians	On loan + option to purchase
Forwards
7	Fotis Ioannidis	(Greece)	CF	10 January 2000 (age 26)	(Greece) Levadiakos	
9	Federico Macheda	(Italy)	CF	22 August 1991 (age 35)	(Italy) Novara	
10	Carlitos	(Spain)	CF	12 June 1990 (age 36)	(United Arab Emirates) Al Wahda	

== Transfers ==
=== In ===
Squad #	Position	Player	Transferred From	Fee	Date	Ref
27	DF	(Greece) Giannis Kotsiras	(Greece) Asteras Tripolis	250,000 €	19 June 2021	
17	MF	(Spain) Rubén Pérez	(Spain) Leganés	Free	14 July 2021	
31	DF	(Croatia) Zvonimir Šarlija	(Turkey) Ankaragücü	Free	30 July 2021	
91	GK	(Italy) Alberto Brignoli	(Italy) Empoli	Undisclosed	31 August 2021	
2	DF	(Greece) Georgios Vagiannidis	(Italy) Inter Milan	Free	31 August 2021	
34	FW	(Argentina) Sebastián Palacios	(Argentina) Independiente	1,500,000 €	31 August 2021	

=== Loans in ===
Squad #	Position	Player	Transferred From	Fee	Date	Ref
16	MF	(Sweden) Ramon Pascal Lundqvist	(Netherlands) Groningen	Loan	26 August 2021	
98	MF	(Brazil) Mateus Vital	(Brazil) Corinthians	Loan	29 August 2021	
50	MF	(Serbia) Mijat Gaćinović	(Germany) 1899 Hoffenheim	Loan	31 January 2022	

=== Loan returns ===
Squad #	Position	Player	Transferred From	Fee	Date	Ref
19	FW	(Colombia) Juan José Perea	(Greece) Volos	Loan return	30 June 2021	
7	MF	(Greece) Dimitris Kolovos	(Moldova) Sheriff Tiraspol	Loan return	30 June 2021	
23	DF	(Greece) Vangelis Theocharis	(Greece) Levadiakos	Loan return	30 June 2021	
17	FW	(Greece) Dimitrios Emmanouilidis	(Netherlands) Fortuna Sittard	Loan return	30 June 2021	
54	FW	(Greece) Kristo Shehu	(Greece) Apollon Larissa	Loan return	30 June 2021	

=== Loans out ===
Squad #	Position	Player	Transferred From	Fee	Date	Ref
92	MF	(Portugal) António Xavier	(Portugal) Estoril	Loan	31 August 2021	
10	FW	(Greece) Argyris Kampetsis	(Netherlands) Willem II	Loan	31 August 2021	

=== Out ===
Squad #	Position	Player	Transferred To	Fee	Date	Ref
27	DF	(Senegal) Cheikh Niasse	(France) Lille	End of loan	30 June 2021	
8	MF	(Spain) Fausto Tienza	(Spain) Racing de Santander	End of contract	30 June 2021	
37	DF	(France) Yohan Mollo	(France) Hyères	End of contract	30 June 2021	
33	DF	(Greece) Dimitris Karagiannis	(Greece) PAS Giannina	End of contract	30 June 2021	
11	FW	(Colombia) Juan José Perea	(Greece) PAS Giannina	100,000 €	19 July 2021	
27	FW	(Greece) Dimitrios Emmanouilidis	(Denmark) Vejle	400,000 €	24 July 2021	
22	MF	(Greece) Dimitris Kolovos	(Moldova) Sheriff Tiraspol	Undisclosed	29 July 2021	
13	MF	(Senegal) Younousse Sankharé	(Turkey) Giresunspor	Undisclosed	9 August 2021	
36	FW	(Albania) Kristo Shehu	(Greece) Egaleo	Free	11 January 2022	
18	MF	(Greece) Giannis Bouzoukis	(Greece) OFI	Undisclosed	1 February 2022	
23	MF	(Democratic Republic of the Congo) Yeni Ngbakoto	(France) Nancy	Free	1 February 2022	

== Pre-season and friendlies ==
22 July 2021 Friendly	Panathinaikos	1–1	Al Taawoun	Horst, Netherlands
19:00	Chatzitheodoridis 37'	Report	42' Tawamba	Stadium: Sportpark Ter Horst

25 July 2021 Friendly	AZ	3–0	Panathinaikos	Alkmaar, Netherlands
17:00	Karlsson 12'; Boadu 85'; Reijnders 88'	Report		Stadium: AFAS Trainingscomplex

31 July 2021 Friendly	VVV-Venlo	2–2	Panathinaikos	Venlo, Netherlands
17:00	Braken 10' van Rooijen 85'	Report	38' Aitor; 45' Ngbakoto	Stadium: De Koel

6 August 2021 Friendly	Panathinaikos	2–2	Lokomotiva	Athens, Greece
21:00	Chatzigiovanis 40' (pen.), 41'	Report	18' Kačavenda; 87' Artistico	Stadium: Grigoris Lambrakis Stadium

10 August 2021 Friendly	Panathinaikos	1–1	APOEL	Athens, Greece
21:00	Kampetsis 49'	Report	21' Theodorou	Stadium: Leoforos Alexandras Stadium

14 August 2021 Friendly	Milan	2–1	Panathinaikos	Trieste, Italy
21:30	Giroud 16', 43'	Report	77' Ioannidis	Stadium: Stadio Nereo Rocco

21 August 2021 Friendly	Panathinaikos	1–2	Panetolikos	Athens, Greece
19:30	Chatzigiovanis 39'	Report	43' Díaz; 83' Barbosa	Stadium: Leoforos Alexandras Stadium

28 August 2021 Friendly	Panathinaikos	1–1	Asteras Tripolis	Athens, Greece
20:00	Carlitos 18'	Report	40' Benito	Stadium: Leoforos Alexandras Stadium

4 September 2021 Friendly	Panathinaikos	3–2	Lamia	Athens, Greece
19:30	Maurício 31'; Bouzoukis 86'; Carlitos 90'	Report	32' Martínez; 75' Vlachomitros	Stadium: Leoforos Alexandras Stadium

== Competitions ==
=== Super League Greece ===
==== League table ====
Pos	Team	Pld	W	D	L	GF	GA	GD	Pts	Qualification
3	AEK Athens	26	14	4	8	42	28	+14	46	Qualification for the Play-off round
4	Aris	26	13	6	7	28	21	+7	45	Qualification for the Play-off round
5	Panathinaikos	26	13	3	10	41	21	+20	42	Qualification for the Play-off round
6	PAS Giannina	26	11	7	8	28	24	+4	40	Qualification for the Play-off round
7	OFI	26	9	10	7	33	32	+1	37	Qualification for the Play-out round

Source: Super League Greece
Rules for classification: 1) Points; 2) Head-to-head points; 3) Head-to-head goal difference; 4) Goal difference; 5) Goals scored; 6) Play-offs (neutral ground).
(Note: Criteria 6 is only used if needed to decide champion, teams for relegation or teams for UEFA competitions).

==== Regular season ====
11 September 2021 1	Panathinaikos	4–0	Apollon Smyrnis	Athens, Greece
20:30	Maurício 30'; Carlitos 45+1', 73'; Alexandropoulos 83'	Report		Stadium: Leoforos Alexandras Stadium; Referee: Anastasios Sidiropoulos

18 September 2021 2	PAS Giannina	1–0	Panathinaikos	Ioannina, Greece
20:30	Gardawski 5'	Report		Stadium: Zosimades Stadium; Referee: Ioannis Papadopoulos

22 September 2021 3	Aris Thessaloniki	1–0	Panathinaikos	Thessaloniki, Greece
20:30	Kamara 10'	Report		Stadium: Kleanthis Vikelidis Stadium; Referee: Anastasios Papapetrou

26 September 2021 4	Panathinaikos	5–1	Volos	Athens, Greece
16:00	Carlitos 3', 69'; Ioannidis 4'; Chatzigiovanis 33'; Vital 45+1' (pen.)	Report	58' Gülen	Stadium: Leoforos Alexandras Stadium; Referee: Aristomenis Koutsiaftis

3 October 2021 5	Olympiacos	0–0	Panathinaikos	Piraeus, Greece
20:30		Report		Stadium: Karaiskakis Stadium; Referee: Slavko Vinčić

16 October 2021 6	Panathinaikos	4–1	Ionikos	Athens, Greece
20:30	Carlitos 6', 38', 53'; Palacios 56' (pen.)	Report	11' Sánchez	Stadium: Leoforos Alexandras Stadium; Referee: Evangelos Manouchos

23 October 2021 7	Asteras Tripolis	2–1	Panathinaikos	Tripoli, Greece
20:30	Barrales 33' (pen.); Soni 45'	Report	30' Carlitos	Stadium: Theodoros Kolokotronis Stadium; Referee: Vasilios Fotias

31 October 2021 8	Panathinaikos	0–0	OFI	Athens, Greece
17:15		Report		Stadium: Leoforos Alexandras Stadium; Referee: Efstathios Gkortsilas

7 November 2021 9	Panathinaikos	1–3	PAOK	Athens, Greece
19:30	Maurício 59'	Report	13' Akpom; 85' (pen.), 90+8' Kurtić	Stadium: Leoforos Alexandras Stadium; Referee: Carlos del Cerro Grande

22 November 2021 10	Lamia	1–3	Panathinaikos	Volos, Greece
18:00	Arabuli 35'	Report	50' Lundqvist; 86' (pen.) Macheda; 87' Maurício	Stadium: Panthessaliko Stadium; Referee: Stefanos Koubarakis

28 November 2021 11	Panathinaikos	2–0	Panetolikos	Athens, Greece
19:30	Macheda 53' (pen.), 66'	Report		Stadium: Leoforos Alexandras Stadium; Referee: Andreas Gkamaris

5 December 2021 12	AEK Athens	1–0	Panathinaikos	Athens, Greece
19:00	Szymański 2'	Report		Stadium: Athens Olympic Stadium; Referee: Tamás Bognár

11 December 2021 13	Panathinaikos	2–0	Atromitos	Athens, Greece
17:15	Carlitos 31'; Palacios 75'	Report		Stadium: Leoforos Alexandras Stadium; Referee: Aristotelis Diamantopoulos

19 December 2021 15	Panathinaikos	2–0	PAS Giannina	Athens, Greece
19:30	Maurício 54'; Sánchez 69'	Report		Stadium: Leoforos Alexandras Stadium; Referee: Athanasios Tzilos

5 January 2022 16	Panathinaikos	2–0	Aris Thessaloniki	Athens, Greece
21:30	Palacios 14'; Aitor 83'	Report		Stadium: Leoforos Alexandras Stadium; Referee: Vasilios Fotias

9 January 2022 17	Volos	3–1	Panathinaikos	Volos, Greece
17:15	van Weert 34', 76'; Oroz 90+5'	Report	90+3' Palacios	Stadium: Panthessaliko Stadium; Referee: Dennis Higler

16 January 2022 18	Panathinaikos	0–0	Olympiacos	Athens, Greece
19:30		Report		Stadium: Leoforos Alexandras Stadium; Referee: Paweł Raczkowski

22 January 2022 19	Ionikos	0–1	Panathinaikos	Athens, Greece
19:30		Report	38' Aitor	Stadium: Neapoli Stadium; Referee: Aristotelis Diamantopoulos

29 January 2022 20	Panathinaikos	0–1	Asteras Tripolis	Athens, Greece
19:30		Report	84' (pen.) Barrales	Stadium: Leoforos Alexandras Stadium; Referee: Anastasios Sidiropoulos

2 February 2022 21	OFI	3–2	Panathinaikos	Heraklion, Greece
17:15	Selimović 25'; Phellype 85'; Tsilianidis 90+5'	Report	18' (o.g.) Mellado; 42' Palacios	Stadium: Theodoros Vardinogiannis Stadium; Referee: Dimitrios Karantonis

6 February 2022 22	PAOK	2–1	Panathinaikos	Thessaloniki, Greece
19:30	Ingason 77'; Sastre 88'	Report	6' Palacios	Stadium: Toumba Stadium; Referee: Andris Treimanis

13 February 2022 23	Panathinaikos	2–0	Lamia	Athens, Greece
17:15	Ioannidis 3', 82'	Report		Stadium: Leoforos Alexandras Stadium; Referee: Efstathios Gkortsilas

16 February 2022 14	Apollon Smyrnis	0–3	Panathinaikos	Athens, Greece
18:30		Report	13' (pen.) Palacios; 17' (pen.) Aitor; 87' (o.g.) Baxevanidis	Stadium: Georgios Kamaras Stadium; Attendance: Angelos Evangelou

19 February 2022 24	Panetolikos	1–0	Panathinaikos	Agrinio, Greece
19:30	Mendoza 47'	Report		Stadium: Panetolikos Stadium; Referee: Anastasios Sidiropoulos

27 February 2022 25	Panathinaikos	3–0	AEK Athens	Athens, Greece
19:30	Aitor 16' (pen.); Palacios 18'; Ioannidis 29'	Report		Stadium: Leoforos Alexandras Stadium; Referee: António Nobre

6 March 2022 26	Atromitos	0–2	Panathinaikos	Athens, Greece
19:30		Report	75', 77' Palacios	Stadium: Peristeri Stadium; Referee: Evangelos Manouchos

==== Play-off round ====
Pos	Team	Pld	W	D	L	GF	GA	GD	Pts	Qualification
1	Olympiacos (C)	36	25	8	3	62	26	+36	83	Qualification for the Champions League second qualifying round
2	PAOK	36	19	7	10	58	33	+25	64	Qualification for the Europa Conference League second qualifying round
3	Aris	36	18	8	10	39	28	+11	62	Qualification for the Europa Conference League second qualifying round
4	Panathinaikos	36	18	7	11	52	26	+26	61	Qualification for the Europa Conference League third qualifying round (Note: Panathinaikos qualified for the Europa Conference League third qualifying round by winning the Greek Cup.)
5	AEK Athens	36	16	8	12	56	42	+14	56	
6	PAS Giannina	36	12	10	14	34	42	−8	46	

Source: Super League Greece
Rules for classification: 1) Points; 2) Head-to-head points (Regular season and play-off); 3) Head-to-head goal difference (Regular season and play-off); 4) Regular season position.
(C) Champions
Notes:

13 March 2022 1	Panathinaikos	1–1	AEK Athens	Athens, Greece
19:30	Aitor 4'	Report	45+2' (pen.) Amrabat	Stadium: Leoforos Alexandras Stadium; Referee: Nikola Dabanović

20 March 2022 2	Aris Thessaloniki	0–0	Panathinaikos	Thessaloniki, Greece
19:00		Report		Stadium: Kleanthis Vikelidis Stadium; Referee: Tamás Bognár

3 April 2022 3	Panathinaikos	2–1	PAOK	Athens, Greece
19:00	Aitor 34'; Juankar 64'	Report	70' Živković	Stadium: Leoforos Alexandras Stadium; Referee: Irfan Peljto

10 April 2022 4	PAS Giannina	0–0	Panathinaikos	Ioannina, Greece
19:00		Report		Stadium: Zosimades Stadium; Referee: István Vad

17 April 2022 5	Panathinaikos	1–0	Olympiacos	Athens, Greece
21:30	Aitor 42'	Report		Stadium: Leoforos Alexandras Stadium; Referee: Nikola Dabanović

1 May 2022 6	Panathinaikos	1–0	Aris Thessaloniki	Athens, Greece
19:00	Schenkeveld 28'	Report		Stadium: Leoforos Alexandras Stadium; Referee: Aliyar Aghayev

8 May 2022 7	AEK Athens	0–0	Panathinaikos	Athens, Greece
19:30		Report		Stadium: Athens Olympic Stadium; Referee: Matej Jug

11 May 2022 8	Olympiacos	1–2	Panathinaikos	Piraeus, Greece
19:30	Tiquinho 70'	Report	10' Palacios; 54' Schenkeveld	Stadium: Karaiskakis Stadium; Referee: Roi Reinshreiber

14 May 2022 9	Panathinaikos	4–0	PAS Giannina	Athens, Greece
20:00	Villafáñez 37'; Maurício 68'; Carlitos 71'; Juankar 87'	Report		Stadium: Leoforos Alexandras Stadium; Referee: Evangelos Manouchos

17 May 2022 10	PAOK	2–0	Panathinaikos	Thessaloniki, Greece
20:00	Schwab 14'; Akpom 21'	Report		Stadium: Toumba Stadium; Referee: Ivan Kružliak

=== Greek Cup ===
==== Fifth round ====
27 October 2021	Atromitos	0–1	Panathinaikos	Peristeri
19:30 EEST		Report	Carlitos 39'	Stadium: Peristeri Stadium; Referee: Angelos Evangelou (Athens)

==== Round of 16 ====
1 December 2021 First leg	Panathinaikos	2–1	Volos	Ampelokipoi
19:00 EET	Macheda 24'; Alexandropoulos 51'	Report	Fernandes 56'	Stadium: Leoforos Alexandras Stadium; Referee: Ioannis Papadopoulos (Macedonia)

23 December 2021 Second leg	Volos	0–0	Panathinaikos	Volos
17:00 EET		Report		Stadium: Panthessaliko Stadium; Referee: Evaggelos Manouchos (Argolida)

==== Quarter-finals ====
19 January 2022 First leg	Panathinaikos	4–0	Anagennisi Karditsa	Ampelokipoi
19:00 EET	Vital 6', 20'; Aitor 32'; Carlitos 42'	Report		Stadium: Leoforos Alexandras Stadium; Referee: Anastasios Papapetrou (Athens)

9 February 2022 Second leg	Anagennisi Karditsa	0–1	Panathinaikos	Karditsa
16:00 EET		Report	Palacios 42'	Stadium: Municipal Stadium of Karditsa; Referee: Anastasios Sidiropoulos (Dodecanese)

==== Semi-finals ====
20 April 2022 First leg	Panathinaikos	1–0	Lamia	Ampelokipoi
19:00 EEST	Ioannidis 19'			Stadium: Leoforos Alexandras Stadium; Referee: Anastasios Sidiropoulos (Dodecanese)

27 April 2022 Second leg	Lamia	0–2	Panathinaikos	Lamia
18:00 EEST			Ioannidis 42'; Palacios 58'	Stadium: Lamia Municipal Stadium; Referee: Bobby Madden (Scotland)

==== Final ====
21 May 2022	Panathinaikos	1–0	PAOK	Marousi
20:00 EEST	Aitor 34' (pen.)	Report		Stadium: Olympic Stadium; Attendance: 45,409; Referee: Antonio Mateu Lahoz (Spain)
