= 2018–19 Panathinaikos F.C. season =

Panathinaikos
2018–19 season
- Chairman: Manos Mavrokoukoulakis
- Manager: Georgios Donis
- Stadium: Olympic Stadium
- Super League Greece: 8th
- Greek Cup: Round of 16
- Top goalscorer: League: Federico Macheda (10); All: Federico Macheda (11)
Home colours	Away colours	Third colours

The 2018–19 Panathinaikos season is the club's 60th consecutive season in Super League Greece. They are also competing in the Greek Cup.

== Players ==
No.	Name	Nationality	Position (s)	Date of birth (age)	Signed from	Notes
Goalkeepers
1	Sokratis Dioudis	(Greece)	GK	3 February 1993 (24)	(Greece) Aris	
27	Konstantinos Kotsaris	(Greece)	GK	25 July 1996 (21)	Youth system	
61	Vasilios Xenopoulos	(Greece)	GK	20 May 1998 (20)	Youth system	
71	Nikos Christogeorgos	(Greece)	GK	18 January 2000 (18)	Youth system	
Defenders
2	Mattias Johansson	(Sweden)	RB / RM	16 February 1992 (25)	(Netherlands) Alkmaar	
3	Emanuel Insúa	(Argentina)	LB / LM	10 April 1991 (26)	(Italy) Udinese	
4	Dimitris Kolovetsios	(Greece)	CB	16 October 1991 (25)	(Greece) AEK Athens	
5	Vangelis Oikonomou	(Greece)	CB / LB	18 July 1987 (30)	(Greece) Panionios	
12	Ilias Chatzitheodoridis	(Greece)	LB / LM	5 December 1997 (20)	(England) Brentford	
16	Kostas Apostolakis	(Greece)	RB / CM	28 May 1999 (19)	Youth system	
23	Vangelis Theocharis	(Greece)	CB	6 July 1998 (20)	Youth system	
24	Fanis Mavrommatis	(Greece)	CB	16 January 1997 (21)	Youth system	
32	Epaminondas Pantelakis	(Greece)	CB	10 February 1995 (23)	(Greece) Olympiacos	
44	Achilleas Poungouras	(Greece)	CB	13 December 1995 (22)	(Greece) PAOK	
48	Alexandros Triantafyllopoulos	(Greece)	CB	10 January 1997 (21)	Youth system	
78	Ousmane Coulibaly	(Mali)	RB / LB	9 July 1989 (age 27)	(Greece) Platanias	
Midfielders
6	Paschalis Staikos	(Greece)	CM / DM	8 February 1996 (21)	Youth system	
7	Omri Altman	(Israel)	W / F	23 March 1994 (23)	(Israel) Hapoel Tel Aviv	
8	Christos Donis	(Greece)	CM	9 October 1994 (22)	Youth system	
10	Anthony Mounier	(France)	RW	27 September 1987 (30)	(Italy) Bologna	
11	Anastasios Chatzigiovanis	(Greece)	RW / LW	31 May 1997 (20)	Youth system	
18	Giannis Bouzoukis	(Greece)	RW / LW	27 March 1998 (20)	Youth system	
21	Dimitrios Kourbelis	(Greece)	MF / CB	2 November 1993 (24)	(Greece) Asteras Tripolis	
22	Theofanis Tzandaris	(Greece)	DM	13 June 1993 (age 24)	(Greece) Olympiacos	
26	Ergys Kaçe	(Albania)	DM	8 July 1993 (24)	(Greece) PAOK	
77	Christos Kountouriotis	(Greece)	MF	2 January 1998 (age 20)	Youth system	
Forwards
9	Federico Macheda	(Italy)	CF	22 August 1991 (age 27)	(Italy) Novara	
17	Dimitrios Emmanouilidis	(Greece)	CF / RW	24 October 2000 (age 17)	Youth system	
20	Nikos Vergos	(Greece)	CF	13 January 1996 (age 22)	(Greece) Olympiacos	
29	Mark Sifneos	(Netherlands)	CF	24 November 1996 (age 21)	(India) FC Goa	
31	Christos Shehu	(Albania)	CF	1 March 2000 (age 18)	Youth system	
99	Argyris Kampetsis	(Greece)	CF	6 May 1999 (age 19)	(Germany) Borussia Dortmund II	

== Transfers ==
=== In ===
==== Summer ====
No.	Pos.	Nation	Player
9	FW	ITA	Federico Macheda (from (Italy) Novara)
12	DF	GRE	Ilias Chatzitheodoridis (from (England) Brentford, previously on loan at (England) Cheltenham Town)
20	FW	GRE	Nikos Vergos (from (Greece) Olympiacos)
29	FW	NED	Mark Sifneos (from (India) FC Goa)
32	DF	GRE	Epaminondas Pantelakis (from (Greece) Olympiacos, previously on loan at (Greece) AO Chania−Kissamikos)
44	DF	GRE	Achilleas Poungouras (from (Greece) PAOK)
99	FW	GRE	Argyris Kampetsis (from (Germany) Borussia Dortmund II)

=== Out ===
==== Summer ====
No.	Pos.	Nation	Player
8	FW	SWE	Guillermo Molins (to (Sweden) Malmö FF)
9	FW	GRE	Giannis Mystakidis (loan return to (Greece) PAOK)
15	DF	GRE	Anastasios Avlonitis (to (Austria) Sturm Graz)
17	MF	FIN	Robin Lod (to (Spain) Sporting Gijón)
18	FW	BRA	Luciano Neves (to (Brazil) Fluminense)
41	DF	GRE	Stefanos Evangelou (to (Greece) Olympiacos)
99	GK	GER	Odysseas Vlachodimos (to (Portugal) Benfica)
38	MF	GRE	Theodoros Mingos (to (Cyprus) Olympiakos Nicosia)
14	FW	GRE	Sotiris-Pantelis Pispas (to (Greece) Volos)

== Competitions ==
=== Super League Greece ===
==== League table ====
Pos	Team	Pld	W	D	L	GF	GA	GD	Pts
6	Panionios	30	11	5	14	27	45	−18	38
7	Lamia	30	9	10	11	28	37	−9	37
8	Panathinaikos (Note: Panathinaikos were deducted 11 points. 6 points for financial reasons plus 5 points by court decision.)	30	13	8	9	38	30	+8	36 (Note: Head-to-head points: Panathinaikos 6, Panetolikos 0.)
9	Panetolikos	30	10	6	14	34	48	−14	36
10	AEL	30	8	10	12	26	34	−8	34

Source: Super League Greece
Rules for classification: 1) Points; 2) Head-to-head points; 3) Head-to-head goal difference; 4) Goal difference; 5) Goals scored; 6) Goals against 7) Play-offs (neutral ground); 8) Draw.
(Note: Criteria 7 is only used if needed to decide champion, teams for relegation or teams for UEFA competitions).

==== Matches ====
26 August 2018 1	Xanthi	0–1	Panathinaikos	Xanthi
19:15		Report	Bouzoukis 69'	Stadium: Xanthi FC Arena; Attendance: 1,933; Referee: Anastasios Sidiropoulos

1 September 2018 2	Panathinaikos	3–1	Lamia	Athens
19:15	Bouzoukis 15'; Emmanouilidis 70'; Kourbelis 88' (pen.)	Report	Adejo 36'	Stadium: Olympic Stadium; Attendance: 5,974; Referee: Alexandros Tsamouris

16 September 2018 3	AEL	1–3	Panathinaikos	Larissa
18:15	Andoni 66'	Report	Johansson 28', 63'; Chatzigiovannis 89' (pen.)	Stadium: AEL FC Arena; Attendance: 3,646; Referee: Georgios Kominis

23 September 2018 4	Panathinaikos	3–0	Levadiakos	Athens
19:00	Kampetsis 5'; Chatzitheodoridis 45'; Johansson 90+3'	Report		Stadium: Olympic Stadium; Attendance: 12,881; Referee: Georgios Tsovaras

29 September 2018 5	Panathinaikos	2–1	PAS Giannina	Athens
19:00	Chatzigiovannis 43'; Macheda 59'	Report	Križman 23'	Stadium: Olympic Stadium; Attendance: 3,810; Referee: Athanasios Tzilos

6 October 2018 6	Asteras Tripolis	1–1	Panathinaikos	Tripoli
20:30	Manias 47'	Report	Macheda 91' (pen.)	Stadium: Theodoros Kolokotronis Stadium; Attendance: 4,567; Referee: Emmanouil Skoulas

20 October 2018 7	Panathinaikos	1–0	Panionios	Athens
16:00	Chatzitheodoridis 72'	Report		Stadium: Olympic Stadium; Attendance: 12,636; Referee: Aristotelis Diamantopoulos

29 October 2018 8	PAOK	2–0	Panathinaikos	Thessaloniki
21:30	Prijović 51'; Limnios 76'	Report		Stadium: Toumba Stadium; Attendance: 20,389; Referee: Jens Maae

3 November 2018 9	Panathinaikos	0–0	AEK Athens	Athens
19:00		Report		Stadium: Olympic Stadium; Attendance: 24,731; Referee: Oliver Drachta

11 November 2018 10	Olympiacos	1–1	Panathinaikos	Piraeus
19:30	Cissé 95'	Report	Kaçe 61'	Stadium: Karaiskakis Stadium; Attendance: 31,250; Referee: Adrien Jaccottet

24 November 2018 11	Panathinaikos	5–1	Apollon Smyrnis	Athens
16:00	Macheda 15', 41'; Kourbelis 58'; Insúa 62'; Johansson 92'	Report	Shikabala 67'	Stadium: Olympic Stadium; Attendance: 4,696; Referee: Fotios Fotiadis

2 December 2018 12	Aris	1–1	Panathinaikos	Thessaloniki
19:00	Younés 15' (pen.)	Report	Chatzigiovannis 93' (pen.)	Stadium: Kleanthis Vikelidis Stadium; Attendance: 9,498; Referee: Georgios Tzavaras

9 December 2018 13	OFI	3–1	Panathinaikos	Heraklion
17:15	Deligiannidis 5'; Platellas 40'; Korovesis 60'	Report	Kaçe 36'	Stadium: Theodoros Vardinogiannis Stadium; Attendance: 4,932; Referee: Emmanouil Skoulas

16 December 2018 14	Panathinaikos	1–0	Atromitos	Athens
19:00	Macheda 15'	Report		Stadium: Olympic Stadium; Attendance: 6,064; Referee: Anastasios Sidiropoulos

13 January 2019 16	Panathinaikos	2–2	Xanthi	Athens
19:00	Bouzoukis 48'; Kolovetsios 68'	Report	Castro 19', 97' (pen.)	Stadium: Olympic Stadium; Attendance: 3,558; Referee: Angelos Evangelou

21 January 2019 17	Lamia	1–0	Panathinaikos	Lamia
19:00	Facundo Bertoglio 52'	Report		Stadium: Lamia Municipal Stadium; Attendance: 2,528; Referee: Praxitelis Zachariadis

27 January 2019 18	Panathinaikos	1–1	AEL	Athens
19:00	Macheda 3' (pen.)	Report	Deletić 54'	Stadium: Olympic Stadium; Attendance: 2,974; Referee: Ioannis Papadopoulos

30 January 2019 15	Panetolikos	0–1	Panathinaikos	Agrinio
19:00		Report	Bouzoukis 32'	Stadium: Panetolikos Stadium; Attendance: 3,047; Referee: Georgios Vreskas

3 February 2019 19	Levadiakos	0–0	Panathinaikos	Livadeia
17:15		Report		Stadium: Levadia Municipal Stadium; Attendance: 1,505; Referee: Vassilios Fotias

9 February 2019 20	PAS Giannina	1–0	Panathinaikos	Ioannina
19:30	Athanasiadis 73'	Report		Stadium: Zosimades Stadium; Attendance: 3,564; Referee: Georgios Kominis

16 February 2019 21	Panathinaikos	1–0	Asteras Tripolis	Athens
19:00	Altman 16'	Report		Stadium: Olympic Stadium; Attendance: 2,058; Referee: Georgios Tassis

24 February 2019 22	Panionios	2–0	Panathinaikos	Athens
15:00	Spiridonović 10'; Stavropoulos 55'	Report		Stadium: Nea Smyrni Stadium; Attendance: 1,227; Referee: Stefanos Koubarakis

3 March 2019 23	Panathinaikos	0–2	PAOK	Athens
19:00		Report	Mauricio 2'; Léo Jabá 47'	Stadium: Olympic Stadium; Attendance: 9,453; Referee: Jakob Kehlet

9 March 2019 24	AEK Athens	0–0	Panathinaikos	Athens
19:30		Report		Stadium: Olympic Stadium; Attendance: 10,145; Referee: Tobias Welz

17 March 2019 25	Panathinaikos	0–3	Olympiacos	Athens
19:00		Report	Guerrero 53'	Stadium: Olympic Stadium; Attendance: 18,976; Referee: Marco Fritz
Note: The match was suspended and later awarded 0–3 by FA decision.

1 April 2019 26	Apollon Smyrnis	1–3	Panathinaikos	Athens
19:00	Vafeas 73'	Report	Chatzitheodoridis 19'; Kampetsis 49'; Macheda 79'	Stadium: Georgios Kamaras Stadium; Attendance: 609; Referee: Fotios Fotiadis

6 April 2019 27	Panathinaikos	2–0	Aris	Athens
19:00	Donis 62'; Insúa 74'	Report		Stadium: Olympic Stadium; Attendance: Behind closed doors Referee: Emmanouil Skoulas

14 April 2019 28	Panathinaikos	1–3	OFI	Athens
19:00	Macheda 42' (pen.)	Report	Macheda 57' (o.g.); Sassi 71'; Giakoumakis 88'	Stadium: Olympic Stadium; Attendance: Behind closed doors Referee: Aristomenis Koutsiaftis

21 April 2019 29	Atromitos	2–0	Panathinaikos	Peristeri
19:00	Bruno 61'; Koulouris 72'	Report		Stadium: Peristeri Stadium; Attendance: 799; Referee: Angelos Evangelou

5 May 2019 30	Panathinaikos	4–0	Panetolikos	Athens
16:00	Chatzigiovanis 14' (pen.); Macheda 19', 40'; Emmanouilidis 81'	Report		Stadium: Olympic Stadium; Attendance: 1,475; Referee: Athanassios Tzilos

=== Greek Cup ===
==== Group C ====
Pos	Team	Pld	W	D	L	GF	GA	GD	Pts	Qualification	PAO	CHA	PNE	OIE
1	Panathinaikos	3	2	1	0	5	3	+2	7	Round of 16		—	—	2–2
2	AO Chania−Kissamikos	3	1	1	1	3	2	+1	4	Round of 16	1–2		0–0	—
3	Panetolikos	3	0	2	1	0	1	−1	2		0–1	—		—
4	OF Ierapetra	3	0	2	1	2	4	−2	2		—	0–2	0–0	

Source: epo.gr
Rules for classification: 1. Points 2. Head-to-head points 3. Head-to-head goal difference 4. Goals scored 5. Goals against 6. Play-offs (neutral ground).

2 October 2018 1	Panetolikos	0–1	Panathinaikos	Agrinio
17:30		Report	Macheda 84'	Stadium: Panetolikos Stadium; Referee: Emmanouil Skoulas

5 December 2018 2	Panathinaikos	2–2	O.F. Ierapetra	Athens
16:00	Chatzitheodoridis 20'; Kampetsis 94'	Report	Hysi 20'; Anastasopoulos 94'	Stadium: Olympic Stadium; Referee: Evangelos Manouchos

19 December 2018 3	AO Chania−Kissamikos	1–2	Panathinaikos	Chania
15:30	Riski 54'	Report	Emmanouilidis 7'; Vergos 75'	Stadium: Perivolia Municipal Stadium; Referee: Aristotelis Diamantopoulos

==== Round of 16 ====
10 January 2019 First leg	Lamia	1–0	Panathinaikos	Lamia
19:30	Barrales 52' (pen.)	Report		Stadium: Lamia Municipal Stadium; Referee: Giorgos Kominis

24 January 2019 Second leg	Panathinaikos	1–0 (a.e.t.) (1–1 agg.) (2–4 p)	Lamia	Athens
19:30	Emmanouilidis 84'	Report		Stadium: Olympic Stadium; Referee: Anastasios Papapetrou
	Penalties
	Chatzigiovanis (penalty scored); Macheda (penalty scored); Kaçe (penalty missed); Kourbelis (penalty missed)		(penalty scored) Epstein; (penalty scored) Bouloulis; (penalty scored) Romanić; (penalty scored) Karamanos
