= Giannis Bouzoukis =

Greek football player (born 1998)

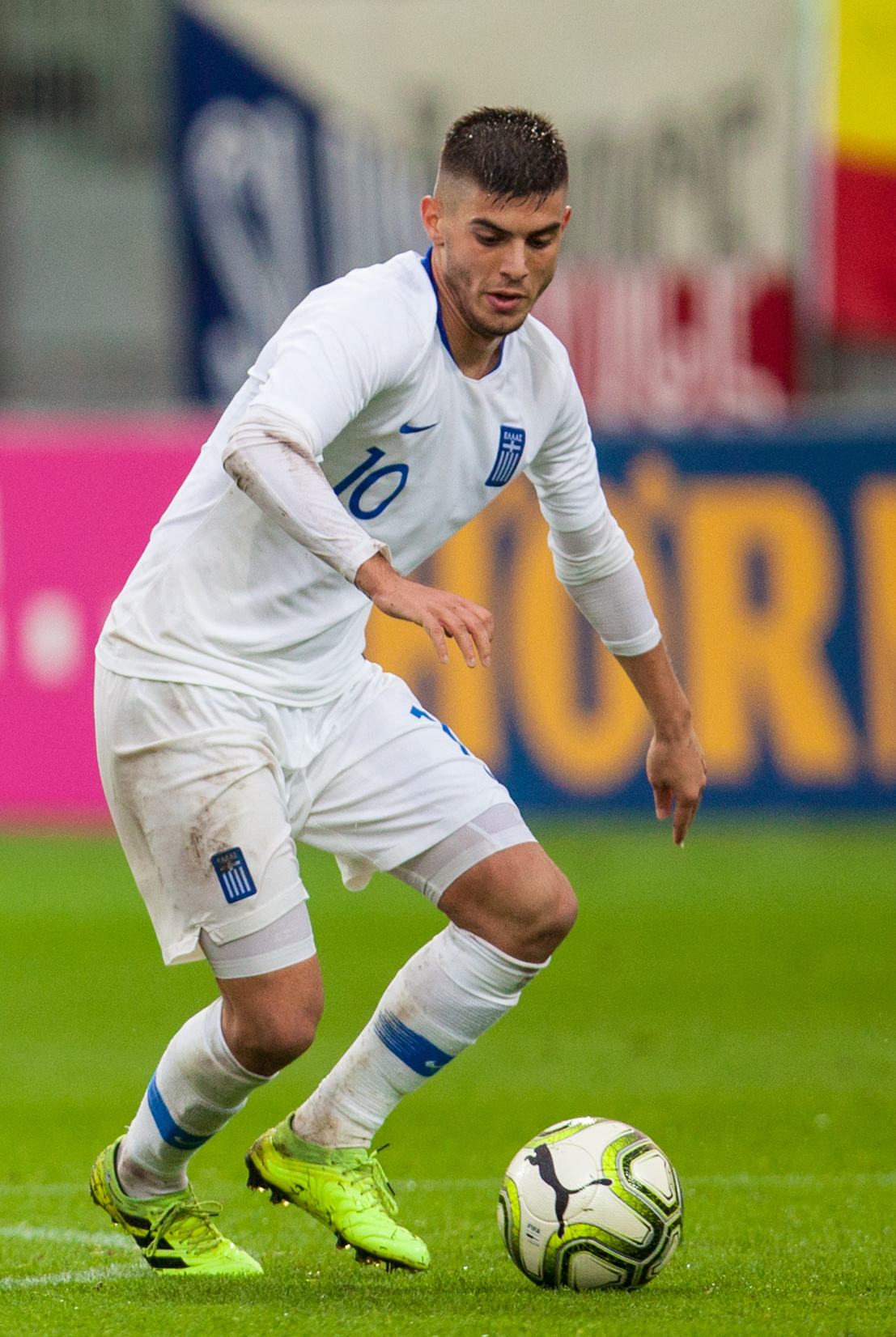
- Bouzoukis with Greece U21 in 2019

Personal information
- Full name: Ioannis Bouzoukis
- Date of birth: 27 March 1998 (age 28)
- Place of birth: Preveza, Greece
- Height: 1.72 m (5 ft 7 1/2 in)
- Position: Midfielder

Team information
- Current team: Asteras Tripolis
- Number: 8

Youth career
- 2012–2017: Panathinaikos

Senior career*
Years	Team	Apps	(Gls)
2017–2022	Panathinaikos	78	(5)
2022–2023	OFI	18	(0)
2023–2025	Panetolikos	53	(4)
2025–2026	Volos	25	(0)
2026–	Asteras Tripolis	3	(0)

International career^{‡}
2015	Greece U17	3	(0)
2017	Greece U19	5	(1)
2018	Greece U20	2	(0)
2018–2019	Greece U21	9	(3)
- * Club domestic league appearances and goals as of 13 September 2026 ‡ National team caps and goals as of 15 November 2019

Giannis Bouzoukis (Greek: Γιάννης Μπουζούκης; born 27 March 1998) is a Greek professional footballer who plays as a midfielder for Super League club Asteras Tripolis.

== Career ==
=== Panathinaikos ===
Bouzoukis plays mainly as a midfielder and joined Panathinaikos from Preveza. On 26 August 2018, thanks to an astonishing long-range effort by the talented winger, Panathinaikos achieved a vital 1–0 away win against rivals Xanthi, in the first matchday of the 2018–19 season. It was his first goal as a professional player. On 1 September 2018, Bouzoukis scored his second consecutive goal against Lamia. On 13 January 2019, Bouzoukis helped Panathinaikos to recover well though after half-time when he fired home a precise low shot after picking up possession at the back post following a deep left-wing cross, equalizing for his club in a final 2–2 home draw against Xanthi. On 30 January 2019, the 20-year-old forward slid the ball home from close range to round off a superb fast-flowing move down the left flank with Tasos Chatzigiovanis feeding Federico Macheda, whose cross was perfect for the young international who scored the only goal in an away win against Panetolikos.

During this season, Bouzoukis has attracted several rival clubs such as champions-elect PAOK from expressing an interest in the talented young midfielder. Key Panathinaikos players would only be sold should the financial situation at the club become even more dire, but the preference of technical director Nikos Dabizas in such a scenario, would be to sell to overseas clubs, such as Portuguese giants Benfica that have reportedly expressed an interest and look set to make a €2 million bid for Bouzoukis, who is one of the most sought after young Greek footballers. However, Panathinaikos would be demanding at least double, with reports suggesting the Greens would not consider anything below €5 million.

On 7 July 2019, Bouzoukis agreed to a new contract with the club, which was set to run until the summer of 2022. The deal reflected the club's confidence in his development and secured his future with the team during that period.

On 25 January 2020, Bouzoukis scored his first goal for the season with a penalty kick in a 2–0 away win against AEL.

=== OFI ===
On 31 January 2022, OFI announced an agreement with Panathinaikos for the transfer of Giannis Bouzoukis for the next 2,5 years, until the summer of 2024.

== Career statistics ==
=== Club ===
As of 6 January 2023

Appearances and goals by club, season and competition
Club	Season	League			Cup		Europe		Total	
Club	Season	Division	Apps	Goals	Apps	Goals	Apps	Goals	Apps	Goals
Panathinaikos	2017–18	Super League Greece	4	0	1	0	–		5	0
Panathinaikos	2018–19	Super League Greece	24	4	3	0	–		27	4
Panathinaikos	2019–20	Super League Greece	33	1	5	1	–		38	2
Panathinaikos	2020–21	Super League Greece	13	0	0	0	—		13	0
Panathinaikos	2021–22	Super League Greece	4	0	1	0	—		5	0
Panathinaikos	Total		78	5	10	1	0	0	88	6
OFI	2021–22	Super League Greece	11	0	0	0	–		11	0
OFI	2022–23	Super League Greece	7	0	0	0	–		7	0
OFI	Total		18	0	0	0	0	0	18	0
Panetolikos	2022–23	Super League Greece	0	0	0	0	–		0	0
Total			98	5	10	1	0	0	108	6

== Honours ==
=== Individual ===
- Super League Greece Young Player of the Season: 2018–19
