= Eutresis (Boeotia) =

Ancient town in Boeotia, Greece

- Εὔτρησις (Ancient Greek)
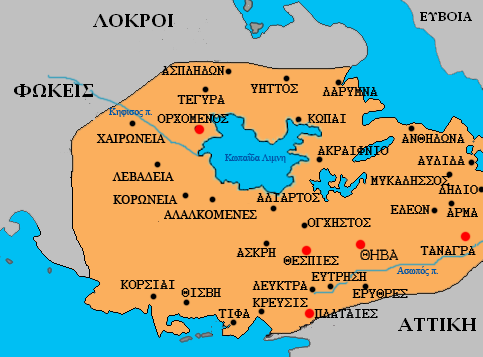
- Ancient major settlements in Boeotia (Voiotia)

- Location within Greece
- 38°16′09″N 23°12′17″E
- Type: Ancient walled settlement straddling the Thespion-Erythron Road
- Location: Arkopodi
- Region: Boeotia
- Part of: Republic of Greece

Eutresis (Ancient Greek: Εὔτρησις) was a town of ancient Boeotia, mentioned by Homer in the Catalogue of Ships in the Iliad, and said to have been the residence of Amphion and Zethus before they ruled over Thebes. In the time of Strabo it was a village in the territory of Thespiae. Stephanus of Byzantium places it on the road from Thespiae to Plataea; but William Martin Leake conjectures that there is an error in the text, and that for Θεσπιῶν (Thespiae) we ought to read Θισβῶν (Thisbe), since there is only one spot in the ten miles between Plataea and Thespiae where any town is likely to have stood, and that was occupied by Leuctra. We learn from Stephanus that Eutresis possessed a celebrated temple and oracle of Apollo, who was hence surnamed Eutresites. The Periplus of Pseudo-Scylax, in its description of the coast of Boeotia, speaks of "ὁ λιμὴν Εὔτρητος καὶ τεῖχος τῶν Βοιωτῶν": "the harbor of Eutresis(?) with a fort of the Boiotians."

== Archeology ==
Its site is located near modern Arkopodi, about 2 kilometres (1.2 mi) from Lefktra (site of ancient Leuctra). Excavations by Hetty Goldman and later archeologists found some remains of Cyclopean walls of the Mycenaean period similar in construction to those at Gla. The archeology shows that the place was abandoned in the last phase of the Mycenaean period and again populated from the 6th century BCE onwards.

In one of the Mycenaean clay tablets with inscriptions in Linear B script that were found in Thebes in 1995, the toponym Eutresis is written in the form "e-u-te-re-u". In the tablet (catalogued as TH Ft 140), Eutresis appears as the supplier of the largest quantity of oil in a series of locations that appear listed. According to the archaeologist Vassilis Aravantinos, Eutresis would have been the second largest town in the area controlled by the palace of Thebes after the capital itself. This identification, while generally accepted, is not undisputed.
