= Dimitrios Kourbelis =

Greek footballer (born 1993)

Dimitris Kourbelis
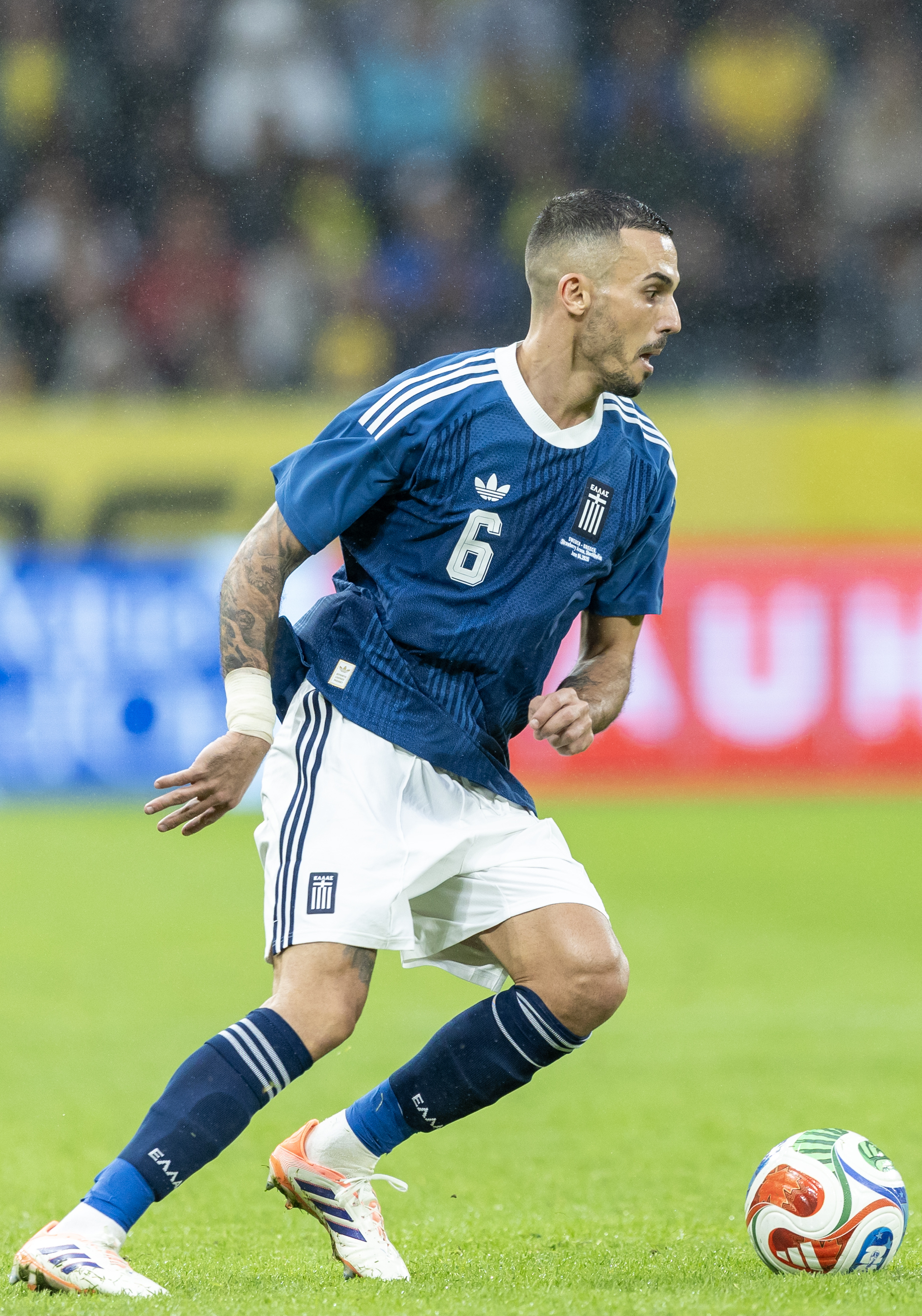
- Kourbelis playing for Greece in 2026

Personal information
- Full name: Dimitrios Kourbelis
- Date of birth: 2 November 1993 (age 33)
- Place of birth: Korakovouni, Arcadia, Greece
- Height: 1.81 m (5 ft 11 in)
- Positions: Defensive midfielder; centre-back

Team information
- Current team: Asteras Tripolis
- Number: 21

Youth career
- 2007–2011: Asteras Tripolis

Senior career*
Years	Team	Apps	(Gls)
2011–2016	Asteras Tripolis	103	(2)
2016–2023	Panathinaikos	149	(7)
2023–2024	Trabzonspor	6	(0)
2024	→ Fatih Karagümrük (loan)	12	(0)
2024–2026	Al-Khaleej	49	(3)
2026–	Asteras Tripolis	5	(0)

International career^{‡}
2011–2012	Greece U19	17	(1)
2013	Greece U20	6	(0)
2012–2015	Greece U21	10	(1)
2017–	Greece	58	(4)
Medal record
Men's football
Representing Greece
UEFA European Under-19 Championship
Runner-up	2012 Estonia
- * Club domestic league appearances and goals as of 20 September 2026 ‡ National team caps and goals as of 4 October 2026

Dimitrios Kourbelis (Greek: Δημήτριος Κουρμπέλης; born 2 November 1993) is a Greek professional footballer who plays as a defensive midfielder for Super League club Asteras Tripolis and the Greece national team.

== Club career ==
=== Asteras Tripolis ===
On 31 May 2015, Kourbelis reached 100 appearances for Asteras Tripolis and scored his first goal in 2014–15 play-offs against Atromitos. He made 131 appearances across all competitions during his career at Tripolis.

=== Panathinaikos ===
On 23 December 2016, Kourbelis signed a 3.5-season contract with Greek club Panathinaikos and was officially announced by Athens club, on an annual fee of €250,000. Panathinaikos will pay €500,000 to his former club during the next three seasons, along with a 25% next transfer percentage and some appearances and targets bonus, which could increase the cost of 23-year-old international's move to the team of manager Marinos Ouzounidis to €700,000. The Greek international quickly earned respect within the club and his quick transition from Asteras Tripolis to Panathinaikos proved his ability to overcome new challenges. On 5 January 2017, he made his debut with the club playing as a starter in a 1–0 away loss against Platanias and ever since, Kourbelis has become an irreplaceable option in Panathinaikos.

After the sale of Zeca to Copenhagen, despite the fact that he had spent only 8 months with the club, he was appointed as the new captain for the 2017–18 season.

On 13 January 2018, according to Live Sport athletic newspaper, Genoa offered about €2 million to the financially struggling Panathinaikos, in order to secure the 24-year-old international defensive midfielder and captain of the club in the January transfer window, without ignoring other German and Italian clubs that asked about the market value of the player. At the last week of the 2018 January transfer window, PAOK submitted a proposal to financial struggling Panathinaikos for the acquisition of the international midfielder. PAOK are offering Panathinaikos €1.5 million for Kourbelis, including the services of Ergys Kaçe, Giannis Mystakidis and Dimitris Konstantinidis for the second half of this season, but the player is reluctant for this transfer, besides the annual fee of €450,000. At the last day of the January transfer window, the administration of PAOK did not manage to reach an agreement with Kourbelis, while Sampdoria will try to capture Panathinaikos' captain. The 25-year old defensive midfielder wants to compete in a team abroad with the Italian club eyeing his case. The Genova's team is willing to offer about €2 million for Kourbelis and a news update is expected. Nevertheless, Panathinaikos maybe capture either Konstantinidis, Kaçe and Mystakidis regardless the future of Kourbelis. Eventually, the captain of Panathinaikos will remained at the club for the rest of the season. On 3 February 2018, Kourbelis suffered an injury during the first half of a home game against Panetolikos. He was expected to remain out of action for 3–4 weeks and his absence was a blow for the plans of Panathinaikos' manager Marinos Ouzounidis.

On 1 September 2018, he scored his first goal for the club in all competitions, with a penalty kick after 21-year-old winger Anastasios Chatzigiovanis was fouled in the box by Lamia's goalscorer Daniel Adejo, sealing a 3–1 home win game. On 24 November 2018, Kourbelis scored as Chatzigiovanis squared the ball for the captain. His initial shot struck Apollon defender Klodian Gino, but the ball fell favorably for Kourbelis to score from the rebound, in a hammering 5–1 home win game against struggling Apollon Smyrnis.

On 27 November 2019, he renewed his contract with the club until the summer of 2023 for an undisclosed fee. On 22 January 2020, the Greek international defender let fly with an unstoppable shot from just outside the penalty area which left Balázs Megyeri no chance, in a hammering 3–0 home win game against Atromitos. On 1 July 2020, the Greece international midfielder made a vital interception before striding forward and beat Fabian Ehmann with four minutes to go to the interval, giving the lead in a 2–0 home win game against Aris. On 6 December 2020, he scored his first goal in the 2020–21 season, leading to a vital 2–1 away win against rivals AEK Athens. On 17 December 2020, he faced a tear in the abductor muscle that kept him out of the squad for six months. After a very difficult year for the defender marred by injury (425 days to be exact), Kourbelis returned to action in an away 2021-22 Greek Cup quarterfinals game against Anagennisi Karditsa F.C. in February 2022.

=== Al-Khaleej ===
In August 2024, Kourbelis signed for Saudi Pro League club Al-Khaleej, receiving a salary of €2 million per year.

=== Asteras Tripolis ===
On 14 July 2026, after three years abroad—initially in Turkey with Trabzonspor and Fatih Karagümrük, and subsequently in Saudi Arabia with Al-Khaleej—the time has come for Dimitris Kourbelis to return home, specifically to the club where he took his first steps in football.

== International career ==
On 9 June 2017, Kourbelis earned Michael Skibbe's first call to Greece national team as a result of his remarkable appearances at Panathinaikos. On the same match, he officially debuted in the Greece national team coming on as a late substitute in a 0–0 away draw against Bosnia and Herzegovina for the 2018 FIFA World Cup qualifications. He scored his first goal on 30 May 2019 during a friendly game against Turkey.

== Career statistics ==
=== Club ===
As of match played 29 September 2026

Club	Season	League			National cup (Note: Includes Greek Cup, Turkish Cup, King's Cup)		Europe		Total	
Club	Season	Division	Apps	Goals	Apps	Goals	Apps	Goals	Apps	Goals
Asteras Tripolis	2011–12	Super League Greece	15	0	2	0	—		17	0
Asteras Tripolis	2012–13	Super League Greece	20	0	5	0	3 (Note: Appearances in UEFA Europa League)	0	28	0
Asteras Tripolis	2013–14	Super League Greece	18	0	2	0	2	0	22	0
Asteras Tripolis	2014–15	Super League Greece	26	2	1	0	7	1	34	3
Asteras Tripolis	2015–16	Super League Greece	20	0	2	0	4	0	26	0
Asteras Tripolis	2016–17	Super League Greece	4	0	—		—		4	0
Asteras Tripolis	Total		103	2	12	0	16	1	131	3
Panathinaikos	2016–17	Super League Greece	19	0	2	0	—		21	0
Panathinaikos	2017–18	Super League Greece	23	0	3	0	4	0	30	0
Panathinaikos	2018–19	Super League Greece	25	2	2	0	—		27	2
Panathinaikos	2019–20	Super League Greece	31	3	6	1	—		37	4
Panathinaikos	2020–21	Super League Greece	10	1	0	0	—		10	1
Panathinaikos	2021–22	Super League Greece	11	0	2	0	—		13	0
Panathinaikos	2022–23	Super League Greece	30	1	4	0	2 (Note: Appearances in UEFA Europa Conference League)	0	36	1
Panathinaikos	Total		149	7	19	1	6	0	174	8
Trabzonspor	2023–24	Süper Lig	6	0	0	0	—		6	0
Fatih Karagümrük (loan)	2023–24	Süper Lig	12	0	4	0	—		16	0
Al-Khaleej FC	2024–25	Saudi Pro League	20	2	1	0	—		21	2
Al-Khaleej FC	2025–26	Saudi Pro League	29	1	2	0	—		31	1
Al-Khaleej FC	Total		49	3	3	0	—		52	3
Asteras Tripolis	2026-27	Super League Greece	5	0	0	0	—		5	0
Career total			324	12	41	1	22	1	387	14

=== International ===
As of match played 1 October 2026

National team	Year	Apps	Goals
Greece	2017	1	0
Greece	2018	6	0
Greece	2019	9	1
Greece	2020	7	0
Greece	2021	0	0
Greece	2022	7	0
Greece	2023	6	0
Greece	2024	7	1
Greece	2025	8	1
Greece	2026	6	1
Total		57	4

International goals

Scores and results list Greece's goal tally first.

No.	Date	Venue	Opponent	Score	Result	Competition
1.	30 May 2019	Antalya Stadium, Antalya, Turkey	Turkey	1–2	1–2	Friendly
2.	21 March 2024	Agia Sophia Stadium, Athens, Greece	Kazakhstan	4–0	5–0	UEFA Euro 2024 qualifying
3.	5 September 2025	Karaiskakis Stadium, Piraeus, Greece	Belarus	4–0	5–1	2026 FIFA World Cup qualification
4.	27 September 2026	Augsburg Arena, Augsburg, Germany	Germany	1–0	1–0	2026–27 UEFA Nations League A

== Honours ==
Asteras Tripolis

- Greek Cup runner-up: 2012–13

Panathinaikos

- Greek Cup: 2021–22

Greece U19

- UEFA European Under-19 Championship runner-up: 2012

Individual

- Super League Greece Team of the Season: 2017–18, 2018–19, 2019–20
