= Andreas Athanasakopoulos =

Greek association football player

Personal information
- Date of birth: 27 November 2001 (age 24)
- Place of birth: Patras, Greece
- Height: 1.81 m (5 ft 11 in)
- Position: Attacking midfielder

Team information
- Current team: Panthrakikos
- Number: 21

Youth career
- 2013–2017: Thyella Patras
- 2017–2019: Panathinaikos

Senior career*
Years	Team	Apps	(Gls)
2019–2024	Panathinaikos	10	(0)
2021–2024	Panathinaikos B	80	(14)
2024–2025	Lamia	24	(1)
2025–2026	Egaleo	26	(2)
2026–	Panthrakikos	0	(0)

International career^{‡}
2017–2018	Greece U17	6	(0)
2018	Greece U18	1	(0)
2019	Greece U19	4	(1)
2021–2022	Greece U21	2	(0)
- * Club domestic league appearances and goals as of 25 April 2026 ‡ National team caps and goals as of 29 March 2022

Andreas Athanasakopoulos (Greek: Ανδρέας Αθανασακόπουλος; born 27 November 2001) is a Greek professional footballer who plays as an attacking midfielder for Super League 2 club Panthrakikos.

== Career ==
=== Panathinaikos ===
Athanasakopoulos plays mainly as a midfielder.

=== Lamia ===
On 1 July 2024, he joined Lamia on a free transfer.

== Career statistics ==
As of 26 June 2025

Club	Season	League			Cup		Continental		Other		Total	
Club	Season	Division	Apps	Goals	Apps	Goals	Apps	Goals	Apps	Goals	Apps	Goals
Panathinaikos	2018–19	Superleague Greece	2	0	—		—		—		2	0
Panathinaikos	2019–20	Superleague Greece	3	0	0	0	—		—		3	0
Panathinaikos	2020–21	Superleague Greece	5	0	1	0	—		—		6	0
Panathinaikos	Total		10	0	1	0	—		—		11	0
Panathinaikos B	2021–22	Superleague Greece 2	28	6	—		—		—		28	6
Panathinaikos B	2022–23	Superleague Greece 2	22	6	—		—		—		22	6
Panathinaikos B	2023–24	Superleague Greece 2	30	2	—		—		—		30	2
Panathinaikos B	Total		80	14	—		—		—		80	14
Lamia	2024–25	Superleague Greece	24	1	1	0	—		—		25	1
Career total			114	15	2	0	0	0	0	0	116	15
