= 2019–20 Panathinaikos F.C. season =

Panathinaikos
2019–20 season
- Chairman: Manos Mavrokoukoulakis
- Manager: Georgios Donis
- Stadium: Olympic Stadium
- Super League Greece: 4th
- Greek Cup: Quarter-finals
- Top goalscorer: League: Federico Macheda (14); All: Federico Macheda (15)
Home colours	Away colours	Third colours

The 2019–20 Panathinaikos season was the club's 61st consecutive season in Super League Greece. They also competed in the Greek Cup.

== Players ==
Note: Flags indicate national team as defined under FIFA eligibility rules; some limited exceptions apply. Players may hold more than one non-FIFA nationality.

No.	Pos.	Nation	Player
1	GK	GRE	Sokratis Dioudis
2	DF	SWE	Mattias Johansson
3	DF	ARG	Emanuel Insúa
4	DF	GRE	Dimitrios Kolovetsios
5	DF	NED	Bart Schenkeveld
6	MF	ESP	Fausto Tienza
7	MF	GRE	Dimitris Kolovos
8	MF	GRE	Christos Donis
9	FW	ITA	Federico Macheda
10	FW	NOR	Ghayas Zahid (on loan from APOEL)
11	MF	GRE	Anastasios Chatzigiovanis
12	DF	GRE	Ilias Chatzitheodoridis
14	MF	FRA	Yohan Mollo
15	GK	GRE	Vasilios Xenopoulos
16	DF	GRE	Kostas Apostolakis
17	MF	DEN	Uffe Bech
18	MF	GRE	Giannis Bouzoukis

No.	Pos.	Nation	Player
19	FW	COL	Juan José Perea
20	MF	MAR	Yassin Ayoub
21	MF	GRE	Dimitrios Kourbelis (captain)
22	MF	HUN	Dominik Nagy (on loan from Legia Warsaw)
23	DF	GRE	Vangelis Theocharis
24	DF	GRE	Theofanis Mavrommatis
26	MF	MAR	Anuar Tuhami (on loan from Real Valladolid)
27	GK	GRE	Konstantinos Kotsaris
30	DF	POR	João Nunes
44	DF	GRE	Achilleas Poungouras
47	DF	GRE	Vasilis Zagaritis
55	MF	GRE	Sotiris Alexandropoulos
57	DF	GRE	Georgios Vagiannidis
71	GK	GRE	Nikos Christogeorgos
77	FW	ITA	Christian Konan
90	FW	ESP	Carlitos
99	FW	GRE	Argyris Kampetsis

== Transfers ==
=== In ===
Date	Pos.	Name	From	Fee	Ref.
12 July 2019	FW	(Italy) Christian Konan	Free agent	Free Transfer	
18 July 2019	MF	(Greece) Dimitris Kolovos	(Cyprus) Omonia	Free Transfer	
5 August 2019	DF	(Portugal) João Nunes	(Poland) Lechia Gdańsk	Free Transfer	
23 July 2019	FW	(France) Yohan Mollo	(France) Sochaux	Free Transfer	
13 August 2019	FW	(Denmark) Uffe Bech	(Germany) Hannover 96	Free Transfer	
28 August 2019	FW	(Colombia) Juan José Perea	(Portugal) FC Porto U19	Free Transfer	
29 August 2019	DF	(Netherlands) Bart Schenkeveld	(Australia) Melbourne City FC	Free Transfer	
12 September 2019	MF	(Spain) Fausto Tienza	(Spain) Extremadura UD	Free Transfer	

=== Loans in ===
Date	Pos.	Name	From	Ref.
23 July 2019	MF	(Norway) Ghayas Zahid	(Cyprus) APOEL	

=== Out ===
Date	Pos.	Name	To	Fee	Ref.
30 June 2019	MF	(Albania) Ergys Kaçe	(Greece) PAOK	End of Loan	
30 June 2019	DF	(Mali) Ousmane Coulibaly	(Qatar) Al-Wakrah	Free	
30 June 2019	DF	(Greece) Konstantinos Valmas	(Greece) Veria	Free	
30 June 2019	MF	(Greece) Christos Kountouriotis	(Slovakia) Zemplín Michalovce	Free	
30 June 2019	MF	(Greece) Dimos Chantzaras	(Greece) Veria	Free	
30 June 2019	MF	(Israel) Omri Altman	(Israel) Hapoel Tel Aviv	Free	

=== Loans out ===
Date	Pos.	Name	T	Ref.
15 July 2019	FW	(Netherlands) Mark Sifneos	(Greece) Apollon Larissa	
16 August 2019	MF	(Greece) Adriano Skenterai	(Greece) Ethnikos Piraeus	

== Team kit ==
Home	Away	Third	Fourth

== Competitions ==
=== Super League Greece ===
==== Regular season ====
===== League table =====
Pos	Team	Pld	W	D	L	GF	GA	GD	Pts	Qualification
2	PAOK	26	18	5	3	50	23	+27	59	Qualification for the Play-off round
3	AEK Athens	26	15	6	5	42	22	+20	51	Qualification for the Play-off round
4	Panathinaikos	26	12	8	6	35	23	+12	44	Qualification for the Play-off round
5	OFI	26	10	4	12	35	35	0	34 (Note: Head-to-head points: OFI 4, Aris 1.)	Qualification for the Play-off round
6	Aris	26	8	10	8	38	32	+6	34	Qualification for the Play-off round

Source: Super League Greece
Rules for classification: 1) Points; 2) Head-to-head points; 3) Head-to-head goal difference; 4) Goal difference; 5) Goals scored; 6) Play-offs (neutral ground).
(Note: Criteria 6 is only used if needed to decide champion, teams for relegation or teams for UEFA competitions).

===== Matches =====
24 August 2019 1	Lamia	1–1	Panathinaikos	Lamia
19:00	Romanić 20'	Report	Macheda 35' (pen.)	Stadium: Lamia Municipal Stadium; Attendance: 2,612; Referee: Manolis Skoulas

31 August 2019 2	Panathinaikos	1–3	OFI	Athens
19:15	Macheda 85'	Report	Manos 33', 49'; Tsilianidis 58'	Stadium: Olympic Stadium; Attendance: 5,039; Referee: Thanasis Tzilos

15 September 2019 3	Aris	4–0	Panathinaikos	Thessaloniki
21:00	Fetfatzidis 20'; Velez 44'; Diguiny 54'; Ideye 64'	Report		Stadium: Kleanthis Vikelidis Stadium; Attendance: 13,129; Referee: Vassilios Fotias

22 September 2019 4	Panathinaikos	1–1	Olympiacos	Athens
20:30	Mollo 90' (pen.)	Report	Guerrero 36'	Stadium: Olympic Stadium; Attendance: 6,700; Referee: Sascha Stegemann (Germany)

29 September 2019 5	Panionios	0–1	Panathinaikos	Athens
17:15	Maniatis (yellow card) 38'; Maksimović (yellow card) 39'; Arce (yellow card) 61'	Report	Zahid 20'; Johansson (yellow card) 27'; Insúa (yellow card) 48'; Kourbelis (yellow card) 89'	Stadium: Nea Smyrni Stadium; Attendance: 2,756; Referee: Angelos Evangelou

5 October 2019 6	Panathinaikos	0–1	Xanthi	Athens
17:15		Report	Faucher 90+3'	Stadium: Georgios Kamaras Stadium; Attendance: 2,614; Referee: Georgios Kominis

20 October 2019 7	Atromitos	0–1	Panathinaikos	Athens
20:00		Report	Chatzigiovanis 43'	Stadium: Peristeri Stadium; Attendance: 1,639; Referee: Anastasios Papapetrou

27 October 2019 8	Panathinaikos	1–2	AEL	Athens
15:00	Zahid 62'	Report	Milosavljević 1'; Warda 57'	Stadium: Olympic Stadium; Attendance: 4,566; Referee: Anastasios Sidiropoulos

3 November 2019 9	PAOK	2–2	Panathinaikos	Thessaloniki
20:00	Vieirinha 65', 90+11' (pen.)	Report	Zahid 44'; Macheda 87'	Stadium: Toumba Stadium; Attendance: 22,466; Referee: Slavko Vinčić (Slovenia)

10 November 2019 10	Panathinaikos	3–2	AEK Athens	Athens
19:30	Macheda 67'; Perea 70'; Kolovetsios 88'	Report	Bakakis 18'; Oliveira 36'	Stadium: Olympic Stadium; Attendance: 11,056; Referee: Mattias Gestranius (Finland)

24 November 2019 11	Panetolikos	0–0	Panathinaikos	Agrinio
19:30		Report		Stadium: Panetolikos Stadium; Attendance: 2,491; Referee: Praxitelis Zahariadis

1 December 2019 12	Panathinaikos	1–0	Asteras Tripolis	Athens
15:00	Chatzigiovanis 8' (pen.)	Report		Stadium: Olympic Stadium; Attendance: 4,780; Referee: Athanasios Sezos

8 December 2019 13	Volos	1–1	Panathinaikos	Volos
19:30	Muñiz 34' (pen.)	Report	Chatzigiovanis 7' (pen.)	Stadium: Panthessaliko Stadium; Attendance: 2,561; Referee: Evangelos Manouhos

14 December 2019 14	Panathinaikos	2–0	Lamia	Athens
19:30	Chatzigiovanis 44' (pen.); Perea 82'	Report		Stadium: Olympic Stadium; Attendance: 2,125; Referee: Georgios Tassis

18 December 2019 15	OFI	1–1	Panathinaikos	Heraklion
17:15	Figueiredo 67'	Report	Macheda 84' (pen.)	Stadium: Theodoros Vardinogiannis Stadium; Attendance: 4,736; Referee: Angelos Evangelou

22 December 2019 16	Panathinaikos	0–0	Aris	Athens
19:30		Report		Stadium: Olympic Stadium; Attendance: 5,373; Referee: Aristotelis Diamantopoulos

5 January 2020 17	Olympiacos	1–0	Panathinaikos	Piraeus
19:30	El-Arabi 74'	Report		Stadium: Karaiskakis Stadium; Attendance: Behind closed doors Referee: Mattias Gestranius (Finland)

12 January 2020 18	Panathinaikos	3–0	Panionios	Athens
19:30	Donis 14'; Macheda 45+1'; Insúa 64'	Report		Stadium: Olympic Stadium; Attendance: 3,172; Referee: Praxitelis Zahariadis

19 January 2020 19	Xanthi	0–1	Panathinaikos	Xanthi
15:00		Report	Macheda 50'	Stadium: Xanthi FC Arena; Attendance: 2,699; Referee: Vassilios Fotias

22 January 2020 20	Panathinaikos	3–0	Atromitos	Athens
19:30	Kourbelis 4'; Schenkeveld 66'; Perea 76'	Report		Stadium: Olympic Stadium; Attendance: 3,876; Referee: Stefanos Koubarakis

25 January 2020 21	AEL	0–2	Panathinaikos	Larissa
19:30		Report	Chatzigiovanis 25' (pen.); Bouzoukis 90+1' (pen.)	Stadium: AEL FC Arena; Attendance: 3,307; Referee: Georgios Vreskas

2 February 2020 22	Panathinaikos	2–0	PAOK	Athens
19:30	Macheda 49' (pen.); Chatzigiovanis 56'	Report		Stadium: Olympic Stadium; Attendance: 19,133; Referee: Aliyar Aghayev (Azerbaijan)

9 February 2020 23	AEK Athens	1–0	Panathinaikos	Athens
19:30	Araujo 8'	Report		Stadium: Olympic Stadium; Attendance: 20,374; Referee: Fran Jović (Croatia)

16 February 2020 24	Panathinaikos	3–1	Panetolikos	Athens
15:00	Vagiannidis 23'; Zahid 40'; Macheda 49' (pen.)	Report	Dauda 90+1'	Stadium: Olympic Stadium; Attendance: 3,516; Referee: Georgios Kominis

22 February 2020 25	Asteras Tripolis	1–1	Panathinaikos	Tripoli
19:30	Jauregi 85'	Report	Macheda 51' (pen.)	Stadium: Theodoros Kolokotronis Stadium; Attendance: 2,863; Referee: Evangelos Manouhos

1 March 2020 26	Panathinaikos	4–1	Volos	Athens
19:00	Nagy 3'; Kourbelis 45+1'; Macheda 68'; Chatzigiovanis 76'	Report	Jendrišek 53'	Stadium: Olympic Stadium; Attendance: 2,053; Referee: Aristidis Vatsios

==== Play-offs ====
===== League table =====
Pos	Team	Pld	W	D	L	GF	GA	GD	Pts	Qualification
1	Olympiacos (C)	36	28	7	1	74	16	+58	91	Qualification for the Champions League play-off round
2	PAOK	36	21	10	5	58	29	+29	73	Qualification for the Champions League second qualifying round
3	AEK Athens	36	20	9	7	59	32	+27	69	Qualification for the Europa League third qualifying round
4	Panathinaikos (Note: Panathinaikos were banned from UEFA club competitions for the first season they would qualify between the 2018–19 and 2020–21 seasons by the UEFA Club Financial Control Body on 24 April 2018 due to overdue payables, and since they did not qualify for either the 2018–19 or 2019–20 season, they were banned from the 2020–21 season.)	36	15	13	8	43	32	+11	58	
5	Aris	36	10	12	14	48	51	−3	42	Qualification for the Europa League second qualifying round
6	OFI	36	10	6	20	43	56	−13	36	Qualification for the Europa League second qualifying round

Source: Super League Greece
Rules for classification: 1) Points; 2) Head-to-head points; 3) Head-to-head goal difference; 4) Goals scored; 5) Goals against; 6) Play-offs (neutral ground); 7) Draw.
(Note: Criteria 6 is only used if needed to decide champion, teams for relegation or teams for UEFA competitions).
(C) Champions

===== Matches =====
7 June 2020 1	AEK Athens	1–1	Panathinaikos	Athens
21:30	Livaja 76'	Report	Macheda 65'	Stadium: Olympic Stadium; Attendance: Behind closed doors Referee: Athanassios Tzilos

13 June 2020 2	Panathinaikos	0–0	PAOK	Athens
21:30		Report		Stadium: Olympic Stadium; Attendance: Behind closed doors Referee: Vasilios Fotias

21 June 2020 3	Olympiacos	3–0	Panathinaikos	Piraeus
21:30	Guilherme 5'; El-Arabi 21'; Cafú 90+1'	Report		Stadium: Karaiskakis Stadium; Attendance: Behind closed doors Referee: Anastasios Sidiropoulos

27 June 2020 4	OFI	0–0	Panathinaikos	Heraklion
21:30		Report		Stadium: Theodoros Vardinogiannis Stadium; Attendance: Behind closed doors Referee: Dimitrios Karantonis

1 July 2020 5	Panathinaikos	2–0	Aris	Athens
19:15	Kourbelis 41'; Kolovetsios 88'	Report		Stadium: Olympic Stadium; Attendance: Behind closed doors Referee: Angelos Evangelou

5 July 2020 6	Panathinaikos	0–0	Olympiacos	Athens
21:30		Report		Stadium: Olympic Stadium; Attendance: Behind closed doors Referee: Giorgos Kominis

8 July 2020 7	PAOK	0–0	Panathinaikos	Thessaloniki
21:00		Report		Stadium: Toumba Stadium; Attendance: Behind closed doors Referee: Damir Skomina (Slovenia)

12 July 2020 8	Panathinaikos	1–3	AEK Athens	Athens
20:00	Kourbelis 15'	Report	Chyhrynskyi 8'; Oliveira 43'; Verde 90+4'	Stadium: Olympic Stadium; Attendance: Behind closed doors Referee: Aristotelis Diamantopoulos

15 July 2020 9	Aris	0–1	Panathinaikos	Thessaloniki
19:15		Report	Kolovos 75'	Stadium: Kleanthis Vikelidis Stadium; Attendance: Behind closed doors Referee: Georgios Vreskas

19 July 2020 10	Panathinaikos	3–2	OFI	Athens
20:00	Bech 27'; Macheda 35'; Chatzigiovanis 42'	Report	Figueiredo 29'; Vaz 38'	Stadium: Olympic Stadium; Attendance: Behind closed doors Referee: Ioannis Papadopoulos

=== Greek Cup ===
==== Fifth round ====
30 October 2019 First leg	Panachaiki	1–3	Panathinaikos	Patras
19:30				Stadium: Kostas Davourlis Stadium

5 December 2019 Second leg	Panathinaikos	2–0 (5–1 agg.)	Panachaiki	Athens
19:30				Stadium: Olympic Stadium

==== Round of 16 ====
8 January 2020 First leg	PAS Giannina	1–0	Panathinaikos	Ioannina
17:15	Pamlidis 28'	Report		Stadium: Zosimades Stadium; Referee: Fotis Fotiadis

15 January 2020 Second leg	Panathinaikos	3–1 (3–1 agg.)	PAS Giannina	Athens
17:15	Donis 56'; Schenkeveld 58'; Macheda 72' (pen.)	Report	Pantelakis 24'	Stadium: Olympic Stadium; Referee: Ioannis Papadopoulos

==== Quarter-finals ====
5 February 2020 First leg	PAOK	2–0	Panathinaikos	Thessaloniki
21:30	Vieirinha 34' (pen.); Varela 72'	Report		Stadium: Toumba Stadium; Referee: Sandro Schärer (Switzerland)

12 February 2020 Second leg	Panathinaikos	0–1 (0–3 agg.)	PAOK	Athens
20:00		Report	Świderski 12'	Stadium: Olympic Stadium; Referee: Michael Fabbri (Italy)
