= Georgios Sideras =

Greek association football player (born 2002)

Personal information
- Date of birth: 30 May 2002 (age 24)
- Place of birth: Agrinio, Greece
- Height: 1.84 m (6 ft 1/2 in)
- Position: Centre-back

Team information
- Current team: PAOK B
- Number: 44

Youth career
- –2018: A.O. Kandilas
- 2018–2021: Panathinaikos

Senior career*
Years	Team	Apps	(Gls)
2021–2024	Panathinaikos B	71	(4)
2021–2024	Panathinaikos	1	(0)
2024–	Iraklis	26	(1)
- * Club domestic league appearances and goals as of March 26, 2026

Georgios Sideras (Greek: Γεώργιος Σιδεράς; born 30 May 2002) is a Greek professional association football player who plays as a centre-back for Super League 2 club PAOK B.

== Career ==
He joined Iraklis in 2024, signing a two-year contract.

== Career statistics ==
As of 26 March 2026

Club	Season	League			Cup		Continental		Other		Total	
Club	Season	Division	Apps	Goals	Apps	Goals	Apps	Goals	Apps	Goals	Apps	Goals
Panathinaikos B	2021–22	Superleague Greece 2	18	1	—		—		—		18	1
Panathinaikos B	2022–23	Superleague Greece 2	24	1	—		—		—		24	1
Panathinaikos B	2023–24	Superleague Greece 2	29	2	—		—		—		29	2
Panathinaikos B	Total		71	4	—		—		—		71	4
Panathinaikos	2021–22	Superleague Greece	1	0	1	0	—		—		2	0
Iraklis	2024–25	Superleague Greece 2	22	1	2	0	—		—		24	1
Iraklis	2025–26	Superleague Greece 2	4	0	4	0	—		—		8	0
Iraklis	Total		26	1	6	0	—		—		32	1
Career total			98	5	7	0	0	0	0	0	105	5

== Honours ==
=== Panathinaikos ===
- Greek Cup: 2021–22
