= Konstantinos Kotsaris =

Greek footballer

Personal information
- Date of birth: 25 July 1996 (age 30)
- Place of birth: Athens, Greece
- Height: 1.85 m (6 ft 1 in)
- Position: Goalkeeper

Team information
- Current team: Panathinaikos
- Number: 70

Youth career
- –2011: Aittitos Spata
- 2011–2014: Panathinaikos

Senior career*
Years	Team	Apps	(Gls)
2014–2020	Panathinaikos	5	(0)
2016–2017	→ Omonia (loan)	0	(0)
2020–2023	Apollon Smyrnis	39	(0)
2023–2024	Athens Kallithea	24	(0)
2024–2025	Kalamata	24	(0)
2025–	Panathinaikos	5	(0)

International career^{‡}
2012	Greece U17	2	(0)
2014	Greece U18	2	(0)
2014–2015	Greece U19	10	(0)
2017–2018	Greece U21	15	(0)
- * Club domestic league appearances and goals as of 15 March 2026 ‡ National team caps and goals as of 23 November 2025

Konstantinos Kotsaris (Greek: Κωνσταντίνος Κότσαρης; born 25 July 1996) is a Greek professional footballer who plays as a goalkeeper for Super League club Panathinaikos.

== Career ==
=== Panathinaikos ===
Kotsaris made his senior debut for Panathinaikos on 8 January 2015, in a Greek Cup match against Chania. On 11 November 2018, in an away 1–1 draw against rivals Olympiacos forced to replace the first choice keeper Sokratis Dioudis, as the latter suffered a face injury in a strong aerial challenge from Bibras Natcho. It was his first appearance in Super League and has shown an incredible stability despite his first match.

=== Apollon Smyrnis ===
On 14 September 2020, Apollon Smyrnis officially announced the signing of the Greek goalkeeper on a free transfer.

=== Athens Kallithea ===
On 4 July 2023, Kotsaris joined Athens Kallithea.

== Career statistics ==
As of match played 9 May 2026

Club	Season	League			National cup (Note: Includes Greek Football Cup)		Europe		Total	
Club	Season	Division	Apps	Goals	Apps	Goals	Apps	Goals	Apps	Goals
Panathinaikos	2014–15	Super League Greece	0	0	1	0	0	0	1	0
Panathinaikos	2015–16	Super League Greece	0	0	0	0	—		0	0
Panathinaikos	2017–18	Super League Greece	0	0	0	0	0	0	0	0
Panathinaikos	2018–19	Super League Greece	5	0	2	0	—		7	0
Panathinaikos	2019–20	Super League Greece	0	0	0	0	—		0	0
Panathinaikos	Total		5	0	3	0	0	0	8	0
Omonia (loan)	2016–17	Cypriot First Division	0	0	0	0	—		0	0
Apollon Smyrnis	2020–21	Super League Greece	3	0	1	0	—		4	0
Apollon Smyrnis	2021–22	Super League Greece	15	0	2	0	—		17	0
Apollon Smyrnis	2022–23	Super League Greece 2	20	0	0	0	—		20	0
Apollon Smyrnis	Total		38	0	3	0	—		41	0
Athens Kallithea	2023–24	Super League Greece 2	24	0	1	0	—		25	0
Kalamata	2024–25	Super League Greece 2	24	0	2	0	—		26	0
Panathinaikos	2025–26	Super League Greece	5	0	2	0	0	0	7	0
Career total			96	0	11	0	0	0	107	0
