= Ilias Chatzitheodoridis =

Greek professional footballer

Personal information
- Full name: Ilias Chatzitheodoridis
- Date of birth: 5 November 1997 (age 29)
- Place of birth: Katerini, Greece
- Height: 1.71 m (5 ft 7 in)
- Position: Left-back

Team information
- Current team: Kalamata
- Number: 12

Youth career
- 2012–2014: Mas Kallitheakos
- 2014–2016: Arsenal

Senior career*
Years	Team	Apps	(Gls)
2016–2018	Brentford	0	(0)
2018	→ Cheltenham Town (loan)	18	(0)
2018–2022	Panathinaikos	55	(3)
2021	Panathinaikos B	1	(0)
2022–2024	Panetolikos	44	(2)
2024–2026	OFI	47	(0)
2026–	Kalamata	4	(0)
- * Club domestic league appearances and goals as of 22:00, 20 September 2026 (UTC)

Ilias Chatzitheodoridis (Greek: Ηλίας Χατζηθεοδωρίδης; born 5 November 1997) is a Greek professional footballer who plays as a left-back for Super League Greece club Kalamata.

Chatzitheodoridis is a product of the Arsenal academy and played senior football in England for Brentford and Cheltenham Town, before returning to Greece in 2018. There he played for Panathinaikos, Panetolikos, OFI and Kalamata.

== Club career ==
=== Arsenal ===
A left back, Chatzitheodoridis began his career in his native Greece, playing for Mas Kallitheakos and training part-time with Arsenal's Greek academy. After impressing on trial, he signed a two-year scholarship deal with the Premier League club's principle academy in England on 6 June 2014. Chatzitheodoridis made 44 appearances and scored one goal for the U18 team over the course of two seasons, before being released in June 2016.

=== Brentford ===
Chatzitheodoridis joined the B team at Championship club Brentford on trial during 2016–17 pre-season and he impressed enough to sign a one-year professional contract on 6 August 2016. An injury crisis at left back saw Chatzitheodoridis win his maiden first team call up for a league match versus Wolverhampton Wanderers on 24 September 2016, but he remained an unused substitute during the 3–1 defeat. He signed a new two-year contract extension in March 2017.

The departure of second-choice left back Tom Field on loan for the first half of the 2017–18 season allowed Chatzitheodoridis to make his senior debut with a start in the Bees' 3–1 EFL Cup first round extra time win over AFC Wimbledon on 8 August 2017. He remained on the pitch until the 97th minute, when he was substituted for Henrik Dalsgaard. He played the full 90 minutes of the 4–1 victory over rivals Queens Park Rangers in the following round and on 7 September, manager Dean Smith reported that Chatzitheodoridis would begin training with the first team on a regular basis. A season-ending injury to Rico Henry in late September saw Chatzitheodoridis become the backup to stand-in left backs Josh Clarke and Yoann Barbet during the first half of the 2017–18 season.

On 19 January 2018, Chatzitheodoridis joined League Two club Cheltenham Town on loan and he was an ever-present starter in the remaining 18 matches of 2017–18 season. Despite being contracted for one further season, Chatzitheodoridis was released by Brentford on a free transfer in July 2018.

=== Panathinaikos ===
On 23 July 2018, Chatzitheodoridis returned to Greece to join Super League club Panathinaikos on a free transfer. He finished a mid-table 2018–19 season with 25 appearances and four goals. Prior to his 2019–20 season being ended by an ankle injury, Chatzitheodoridis had made 26 appearances. He signed a new three-year contract in August 2020 and returned to match play in mid-January 2021. He made 8 appearances during what remained of the 2020–21 season.

Despite frequently being named as a substitute, Chatzitheodoridis saw his playing time diminish and he made just six league appearances during the 2021–22 season. He made one appearance during the club's successful Greek Cup campaign and received a winner's medal. Chatzitheodoridis transferred out of the club in June 2022 and made 66 appearances, scoring four goals, during four seasons at the Leoforos Alexandras Stadium.

=== Panetolikos ===
On 27 June 2022, Chatzitheodoridis signed a two-year contract with Super League club Panetolikos. He made 50 appearances and scored three goals over the course of the 2022–23 and 2023–24 seasons, in both of which the club narrowly avoided relegation. Chatzitheodoridis departed the club at the end of the 2023–24 season.

=== OFI ===
On 14 June 2024, Chatzitheodoridis signed a two-year contract with Super League club OFI on a free transfer. He made 35 appearances during the 2024–25 season, in which the club finished as Greek Cup runners-up. He made 24 appearances during the 2025–26 season, in which the club won the Greek Cup and qualified for European football. Chatzitheodoridis was released when his contract expired at the end of the 2025–26 season and he ended his career with the club on 59 appearances.

=== Kalamata ===
On 2 August 2026, Chatzitheodoridis signed an undisclosed-length contract with Super League club Kalamata on a free transfer.

== International career ==
Chatzitheodoridis was an unused substitute for the Greece U21 team during two 2019 UEFA European U21 Championship qualifiers in October 2018. In June 2025, it was reported that Chatzitheodoridis was in discussions with the KFF about the possibility of representing the Kazakhstan national team.

== Personal life ==
Chatzitheodoridis was born in Greece to Greek parents from Kazakhstan.

== Career statistics ==
As of match played 22 August 2026

Appearances and goals by club, season and competition
Club	Season	League			National cup (Note: Includes FA Cup, Greek Cup)		League cup (Note: Includes EFL Cup)		Other		Total	
Club	Season	Division	Apps	Goals	Apps	Goals	Apps	Goals	Apps	Goals	Apps	Goals
Brentford	2016–17	Championship	0	0	0	0	0	0	—		0	0
Brentford	2017–18	Championship	0	0	1	0	3	0	—		4	0
Brentford	Total		0	0	1	0	3	0	—		4	0
Cheltenham Town (loan)	2017–18	League Two	18	0	—		—		—		18	0
Panathinaikos	2018–19	Super League Greece	20	3	5	1	—		—		25	4
Panathinaikos	2019–20	Super League Greece	23	0	3	0	—		—		26	0
Panathinaikos	2020–21	Super League Greece	6	0	2	0	—		—		8	0
Panathinaikos	2021–22	Super League Greece	6	0	1	0	—		—		7	0
Panathinaikos	Total		55	3	11	1	—		—		66	4
Panathinaikos B	2021–22	Super League Greece 2 South	1	0	—		—		—		1	0
Panetolikos	2022–23	Super League Greece	18	0	1	0	—		—		19	0
Panetolikos	2023–24	Super League Greece	26	2	5	1	—		—		31	3
Panetolikos	Total		44	2	6	1	—		—		50	3
OFI	2024–25	Super League Greece	29	0	6	0	—		—		35	0
OFI	2025–26	Super League Greece	18	0	5	0	—		1 (Note: Appearance in Greek Super Cup)	0	24	0
OFI	Total		47	0	11	0	—		1	0	59	0
Kalamata	2026–27	Super League Greece	1	0	0	0	—		—		1	0
Career total			166	5	29	2	3	0	1	0	199	7

== Honours ==
Panathinaikos

- Greek Cup: 2021–22

OFI

- Greek Cup: 2025–26
