= Theofanis Mavrommatis =

Greek footballer

Fanis Mavrommatis
Personal information
- Full name: Theofanis-Marios Mavrommatis
- Date of birth: 16 January 1997 (age 29)
- Place of birth: Argos, Greece
- Height: 1.87 m (6 ft 2 in)
- Position: Centre-back

Team information
- Current team: Chania
- Number: 24

Youth career
- Aristeas Argos
- 2014–2015: Panargiakos
- 2015–2018: Panathinaikos

Senior career*
Years	Team	Apps	(Gls)
2018–2021	Panathinaikos	26	(0)
2020	→ SønderjyskE (loan)	2	(0)
2021–2023	Atromitos	48	(2)
2023–2024	Al-Adalah	18	(0)
2025–	Chania	1	(0)

International career^{‡}
2015	Greece U18	2	(0)
2016	Greece U19	2	(0)
2018	Greece U21	1	(0)
- * Club domestic league appearances and goals as of 5 October 2025 ‡ National team caps and goals as of 15 October 2018

Theofanis Mavrommatis (Greek: Θεοφάνης Μαυρομμάτης, born 16 January 1997) is a Greek professional footballer who plays as a centre-back for Super League 2 club Chania.

== Career ==
=== Panathinaikos ===
Mavrommatis joined Panathinaikos from the youth ranks of Panargiakos.

On 1 September 2018, Mavrommatis made his first professional appearance for the team in the 2018–19 Super League Greece game against Lamia. In January 2020, Theofanis Mavrommatis was shifted out on loan to Danish club SonderjyskE after a disappointing first half of the season, but he showed promise with reliable performance in Denmark before the coronavirus pandemic halted the Superliga. Reports have suggested that Mavrommatis will be given another chance by Georgios Donis, but the centre-back will only be used as a back-up option.

=== Atromitos ===
On 31 January 2021, following his release from Panathinaikos, Mavrommatis signed a contract with Atromitos, until the summer of 2022.

=== Al-Adalah ===
On 28 July 2023, Mavrommatis joined Saudi Arabian club Al-Adalah.

== Career statistics ==
As of match played 13 May 2023

Club	Season	League			Greek Cup		Total	
Club	Season	Division	Apps	Goals	Apps	Goals	Apps	Goals
Panathinaikos	2018–19	Super League Greece	20	0	1	0	21	0
Panathinaikos	2019–20	Super League Greece	1	0	2	0	3	0
Panathinaikos	2020–21	Super League Greece	1	0	0	0	1	0
Panathinaikos	Total		22	0	3	0	25	0
SønderjyskE (loan)	2019–20	Danish Superliga	2	0	–		2	0
Atromitos	2020–21	Super League Greece	9	1	0	0	9	1
Atromitos	2021–22	Super League Greece	18	1	1	0	19	1
Atromitos	2022–23	Super League Greece	18	0	2	0	20	0
Atromitos	Total		45	2	3	0	48	2
Career total			69	2	6	0	75	2
