= Konstantinos Valmas =

Greek footballer

Personal information
- Full name: Konstantinos Valmas
- Date of birth: 12 March 1998 (age 28)
- Place of birth: Athens, Greece
- Height: 1.72 m (5 ft 7 1/2 in)
- Position: Right back

Team information
- Current team: AEP Kozani

Youth career
- 2008–2017: Panathinaikos

Senior career*
Years	Team	Apps	(Gls)
2017–2019	Panathinaikos	0	(0)
2017–2018	→ Kallithea (loan)	5	(0)
2019	→ Sparta (loan)	8	(0)
2019–2020	Anagennisi Deryneia	15	(0)
2020–2021	Xanthi	0	(0)
2021	→ Egaleo (loan)	0	(0)
2021–	AEP Kozani	0	(0)

International career
2014	Greece U17	2	(0)
2016–2017	Greece U19	9	(0)
2018	Greece U20	2	(0)
- * Club domestic league appearances and goals as of 7 March 2020

Konstantinos Valmas (Greek: Κωνσταντίνος Βαλμάς; born 12 March 1998) is a Greek professional footballer who plays as a right back for Gamma Ethniki club AEP Kozani.
