= Vasilios Xenopoulos =

Greek footballer

Vasilis Xenopoulos
Personal information
- Full name: Vasilios Xenopoulos
- Date of birth: 20 May 1998 (age 28)
- Place of birth: Athens, Greece
- Height: 1.85 m (6 ft 1 in)
- Position: Goalkeeper

Team information
- Current team: Panetolikos
- Number: 23

Youth career
- 2007–2016: Panathinaikos

Senior career*
Years	Team	Apps	(Gls)
2016–2024	Panathinaikos	4	(0)
2021–2024	Panathinaikos B	38	(0)
2024–2026	A.E. Kifisia	22	(0)
2026–	Panetolikos	0	(0)

International career^{‡}
2020	Greece U21	1	(0)
- * Club domestic league appearances and goals as of 31 May 2026 ‡ National team caps and goals as of 9 September 2020

Vasilios Xenopoulos (Greek: Βασίλειος Ξενόπουλος; born 20 May 1998) is a Greek professional footballer who plays as a goalkeeper for Super League club Panetolikos.

== Career ==
=== Panathinaikos ===
Xenopoulos plays as a goalkeeper and joined Panathinaikos from the team's youth ranks. He appeared in 3 games throughout the 2019–20 season, keeping one clean sheet.

On 12 February 2021, Xenopoulos signed a new contract, running until the summer of 2023.

== Career statistics ==
As of 28 August 2024

Club	Season	League			Cup		Continental		Other		Total	
Club	Season	Division	Apps	Goals	Apps	Goals	Apps	Goals	Apps	Goals	Apps	Goals
Panathinaikos	2019–20	Super League Greece	3	0	0	0	—		—		3	0
Panathinaikos	2020–21	Super League Greece	1	0	1	0	—		—		2	0
Panathinaikos	2021–22	Super League Greece	0	0	0	0	—		—		0	0
Panathinaikos	2022–23	Super League Greece	0	0	0	0	—		—		0	0
Panathinaikos	2023–24	Super League Greece	0	0	0	0	0	0	—		0	0
Panathinaikos	Total		4	0	1	0	0	0	—		5	0
Panathinaikos B	2021–22	Super League Greece 2	12	0	—		—		—		12	0
Panathinaikos B	2022–23	Super League Greece 2	11	0	—		—		—		11	0
Panathinaikos B	2023–24	Super League Greece 2	15	0	—		—		—		15	0
Panathinaikos B	Total		38	0	—		—		—		38	0
Career total			42	0	1	0	0	0	0	0	43	0
