= Leuctra =

Village of ancient Boeotia

Coordinates: 38°15′15″N 23°10′51″E

Leuctra or Leuktra (Ancient Greek: τὰ Λεῦκτρα, romanized: tà Leûktra, Attic Greek pronunciation: [tà lêu̯k.tra] or τὸ Λεῦκτρον, tò Leûktron [tò lêu̯k.tron]) was a village in ancient Boeotia, situated on the road from Thespiae to Plataea, and within the territory of the former city. Leuctra is most notable for the Battle of Leuctra, fought in its neighbourhood between the Spartans and Thebans in 371 BCE, by which the supremacy of Sparta was demolished. In the plain of Leuctra, was the tomb of the two daughters of Scedasus, a Leuctrian. The daughters were violated by Spartans, and had afterwards slain themselves. Before the battle, Epaminondas crowned the tomb with wreaths, fulfilling an oracle's prophecy that the Spartans would be defeated at this spot.

The site of Leuctra is near the modern village of Lefktra, renamed to reflect to connection with the ancient place.
