= Dimitrios Emmanouilidis =

Greek footballer (born 2000)

Dimitris Emmanouilidis
Personal information
- Full name: Dimitrios Emmanouilidis
- Date of birth: 24 October 2000 (age 26)
- Place of birth: Lefktra, Greece
- Height: 1.75 m (5 ft 9 in)
- Position: Winger

Team information
- Current team: Levadiakos
- Number: 17

Youth career
- 2015–2017: Panathinaikos

Senior career*
| Years | Team | Apps | (Gls) |
| 2017–2021 | Panathinaikos | 16 | (3) |
| 2019–2020 | → Panionios (loan) | 19 | (4) |
| 2021 | → Fortuna Sittard (loan) | 6 | (1) |
| 2021–2025 | Vejle | 81 | (18) |
| 2025–2026 | Asteras Tripolis | 25 | (1) |
| 2026– | Levadiakos | 5 | (0) |

International career^{‡}
| 2016–2017 | Greece U17 | 6 | (0) |
| 2018 | Greece U18 | 3 | (2) |
| 2017–2020 | Greece U19 | 19 | (8) |
| 2020–2021 | Greece U21 | 8 | (1) |
- * Club domestic league appearances and goals as of 20 September 2026 ‡ National team caps and goals as of 21 November 2025

Dimitrios Emmanouilidis (Greek: Δημήτριος Εμμανουηλίδης; born 24 October 2000) is a Greek professional footballer who plays as a winger for Super League club Levadiakos.

== Career ==
=== Panathinaikos ===
Emmanouilidis joined Panathinaikos from the youth ranks of the team. He made his first professional appearance for the team in the 2017–18 Greek Cup game against Panachaiki on 29 November 2017. Over the summer of 2018, he attracted the interest of Europe's top scouts at the Mediterranean Games where he scored 2 goals for the Greece U18 team as Greece finished top of the group ahead of Turkey and France and made the semi-finals. Emmanouilidis scored against both of these countries. Interest from overseas teams peaked but Panathinaikos held firm and kept him. This came after he scored 19 goals for the Panathinaikos U20 team.

In September 2018, he scored his first goal as a professional player, with a side-footed kick after being teed up by Argyris Kampetsis, in a 3–1 home win Super League game against Lamia, being the first player born in the 21st century to score in Greek Superleague. On the last matchday of the 2018–19 season, having come on as a substitute, Emmanouilidis completed the scoring in a 4–0 defeat of Panetolikos with the rebound from Nikos Giannakopoulos' blocked shot.

==== Loan to Panionios ====
With little prospect of first-team football at Panathinaikos after the arrival of Ghayas Zahid and Yohan Mollo, Emmanouilidis joined fellow Super League club Panionios on loan for the 2019–20 season. He scored twice in a 3–0 win away to Olympiacos Volos in the Greek Cup, and his first league goal for Panionios was an 88th-minute equaliser at home to Olympiacos on 23 November, having entered the game only eight minutes earlier. A week later he scored at the extra time sealing a vital 3–0 home win game against Panetolikos in his club effort to avoid relegation. On 15 December 2019, he opened the score in a 2–1 away loss against Volos. On 1 March 2020, Bachana Arabuli spread the ball across the box to Emmanouilidis who calmly tapped it into the empty net with Panagiotis Tsintotas helpless, to open the score in a 1–1 home draw against AEK Athens.

==== Loan to Fortuna Sittard ====
On 1 February 2021, Emmanouilidis moved to Eredivisie club Fortuna Sittard on a loan deal until the end of the season. The deal includes a purchase option.

=== Vejle ===
The 20-year-old was left out of Ivan Jovanovic's plans at Panathinaikos and sought to find a club, so that he could leave with a regular transfer and not on loan. Panathinaikos sold him at a range of €500,000 and Panathinaikos will have a resale rate of 20-25%, while Emmanouilidis will earn approximately €200,000 per year. It is one of the most expensive transfers in the history of Vejle, which convinced the young striker with its project. The Greek footballer played a total of 22 times with Panathinaikos, scoring five goals and giving two assists. On 1 August 2021, he scored his first goal with the club in a 2–2 home draw against Brøndby IF.

=== Asteras Tripolis ===
On 11 June 2025, Emmanouilidis signed for Asteras Tripolis.

=== Levadiakos ===
On 7 July 2026, Emmanouilidis signed for Levadiakos on a free transfer.

== Career statistics ==
=== Club ===
As of match played on 9 April 2026

Appearances and goals by club, season and competition
| Club | Season | League | | | Cup | | Continental | | Other | | Total | |
| Club | Season | Division | Apps | Goals | Apps | Goals | Apps | Goals | Apps | Goals | Apps | Goals |
|---|---|---|---|---|---|---|---|---|---|---|---|---|
| Panathinaikos | 2017–18 | Super League Greece | 1 | 0 | 1 | 0 | — | | — | | 2 | 0 |
| Panathinaikos | 2018–19 | Super League Greece | 11 | 2 | 5 | 2 | — | | — | | 16 | 4 |
| Panathinaikos | 2020–21 | Super League Greece | 4 | 1 | 0 | 0 | — | | — | | 4 | 1 |
| Panathinaikos | Total | | 16 | 3 | 6 | 2 | — | | — | | 22 | 5 |
| Panionios (loan) | 2019–20 | Super League Greece | 19 | 4 | 4 | 2 | — | | — | | 23 | 6 |
| Fortuna Sittard (loan) | 2020–21 | Eredivisie | 6 | 1 | 0 | 0 | — | | — | | 6 | 1 |
| Vejle | 2021–22 | Danish Superliga | 26 | 3 | 5 | 1 | — | | — | | 31 | 4 |
| Vejle | 2022–23 | Danish First Division | 16 | 8 | 4 | 1 | — | | — | | 20 | 9 |
| Vejle | 2023–24 | Danish Superliga | 10 | 2 | 0 | 0 | — | | — | | 10 | 2 |
| Vejle | 2024–25 | Danish Superliga | 29 | 5 | 1 | 1 | — | | — | | 30 | 6 |
| Vejle | Total | | 81 | 18 | 10 | 3 | — | | — | | 91 | 21 |
| Asteras Tripolis | 2025–26 | Super League Greece | 23 | 1 | 5 | 3 | — | | — | | 28 | 4 |
| Career total | | | 145 | 27 | 25 | 10 | 0 | 0 | 0 | 0 | 170 | 37 |

== Honours ==
Vejle

- Danish 1st Division: 2022–23

Individual

- Super League Greece Young Player of the Season: 2019–20
