= Federico Macheda =

Italian footballer (born 1991)

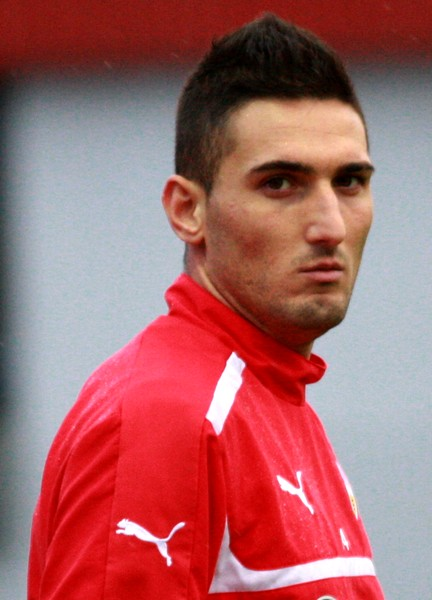
- Macheda training with VfB Stuttgart in 2013

Personal information
- Full name: Federico Macheda
- Date of birth: 22 August 1991 (age 35)
- Place of birth: Rome, Italy
- Height: 1.85 m (6 ft 1 in)
- Position: Striker

Team information
- Current team: Asteras Tripolis
- Number: 9

Youth career
- 2001–2007: Lazio
- 2007–2008: Manchester United

Senior career*
Years	Team	Apps	(Gls)
2008–2014	Manchester United	19	(4)
2011	→ Sampdoria (loan)	14	(0)
2012	→ Queens Park Rangers (loan)	3	(0)
2013	→ VfB Stuttgart (loan)	14	(0)
2013	→ Doncaster Rovers (loan)	5	(3)
2013–2014	→ Doncaster Rovers (loan)	10	(0)
2014	→ Birmingham City (loan)	18	(10)
2014–2016	Cardiff City	27	(6)
2016	→ Nottingham Forest (loan)	3	(0)
2016–2018	Novara	51	(10)
2018–2022	Panathinaikos	106	(36)
2022–2024	Ankaragücü	32	(3)
2023	→ APOEL (loan)	15	(2)
2024–	Asteras Tripolis	63	(17)

International career
2006–2007	Italy U16	10	(2)
2007–2008	Italy U17	3	(0)
2008–2009	Italy U19	2	(0)
2009–2012	Italy U21	10	(4)
- * Club domestic league appearances and goals as of 10 November 2026

Federico Macheda (Italian pronunciation: [fedeˈriːko maˈkɛːda]; born 22 August 1991) is an Italian professional footballer who plays as a striker for Super League Greece club Asteras Tripolis.

Born in Rome, Macheda began his career with local club Lazio, but joined Manchester United when he turned 16 in 2007. He scored on his first-team debut in April 2009. Macheda spent the next couple of years on the fringe of the United first-team, before twice going out on loan – first to Sampdoria in his native Italy in 2011, and then to Queens Park Rangers in 2012, the latter of which was curtailed by injury. He spent further spells on loan, at VfB Stuttgart, Doncaster Rovers and Birmingham City. Having failed to break into the Manchester United first team, Macheda was released at the end of his contract in June 2014, leaving him free to sign for Cardiff City. He spent two years there before being released, also having a short loan at Nottingham Forest, and then spent 18 months with Novara of Serie B. He joined Ankaragücü in 2022, and was loaned to APOEL six months later.

Macheda is a former Italian youth international, having made appearances for the national under-16, under-17, under-19 and under-21 teams. When he made his under-21 debut in August 2009 in a friendly against Russia, he was the youngest player to do so at the age of 17 years, 355 days. He scored his first goals for the team just over a year later in a match against Turkey.

== Club career ==
=== Early career ===
Macheda was born in Rome, Lazio. He began his football career with Lazio's youth team after being spotted at the local Atletico Prenestino club in Rome. However, due to Italian football regulations preventing under-18s from signing professional contracts, he was not permanently tied to the club, and shortly after his 16th birthday, he was signed by Manchester United of England, where regulations permit the signing of players aged 16 and over. Following his family's relocation to England, he officially joined the club as a trainee on 16 September 2007.

=== Manchester United ===
Macheda went straight into the Manchester United Under-18 side, and scored the only goal of the game on his debut, a 1–0 away win over Barnsley on 15 September 2007. In his first season with the club, he finished as the Under-18s' top scorer with a total of 12 goals in 21 appearances, and also made his debut for the reserves on 26 February 2008, when he came on as a 68th-minute substitute for Gerard Piqué in a 2–0 away defeat to Liverpool. On 12 May 2008, Macheda earned a Manchester Senior Cup winners' medal when he was named as an unused substitute for the 2–0 win over Bolton Wanderers in the final.

Macheda signed his first professional contract with Manchester United on his 17th birthday in August 2008. In the 2008–09 season, he continued in the under-18 side, while also making a few appearances for the reserves. Towards the end of the season, Macheda enjoyed an extended run in the reserve team, scoring eight goals in eight games, including a hat-trick in a 3–3 draw with Newcastle United on 30 March 2009, and he was rewarded by being selected for the first team for the match against Aston Villa on 5 April. With United 2–1 down heading into the final third of the game, manager Alex Ferguson brought Macheda on to replace Nani just after the hour mark. After Cristiano Ronaldo equalised for United in the 80th minute, Macheda won the match with a turn to evade his marker followed by a curling effort from just inside the penalty area in the third minute of injury time.

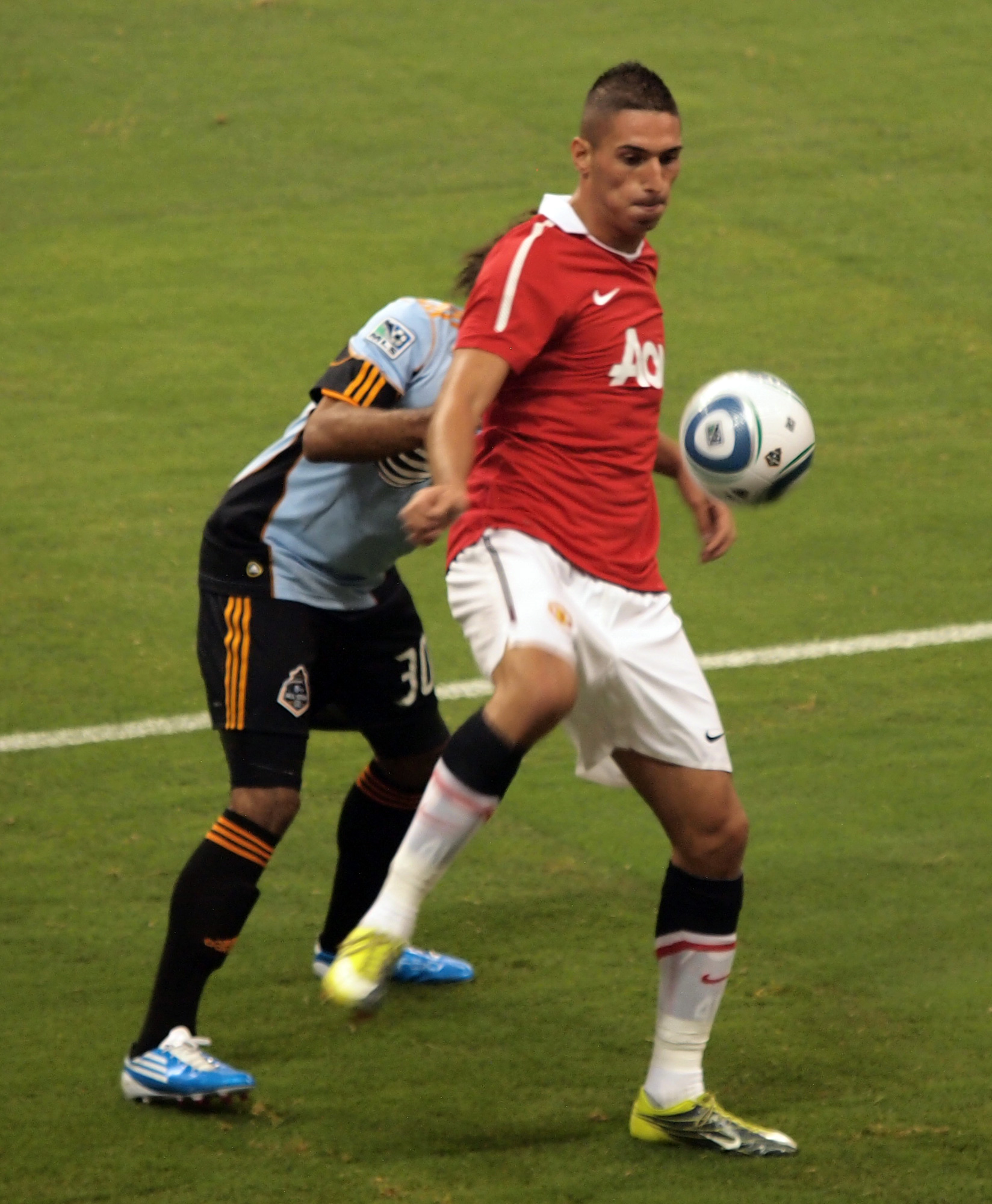
Macheda playing for Manchester United in a 2010 pre-season match against the MLS All-Stars.

Macheda was named on the bench for United's next two games – first against Porto in the first leg of their Champions League quarter-final, and then against Sunderland in the league – making his second appearance for the club in the latter game. Just 46 seconds after taking to the field in place of Dimitar Berbatov, he had the ball in the back of the net for the second time in his United career, deflecting a Michael Carrick shot past Craig Gordon in the Sunderland goal. With Ferguson opting to rest his big-name players for the FA Cup semi-final against Everton on 19 April, Macheda was given his first United start. However, for the first time in his United career, he failed to score and was substituted for Berbatov at the start of extra time. He started his first league game in a 2–0 win over Middlesbrough on 2 May; he was involved in the build-up to Park Ji-Sung's goal, but he failed to score and was substituted ten minutes into the second half. At the end of his first season in the United first team, Macheda was named as the Jimmy Murphy Academy Player of the Year in recognition of his performances in the under-18s, the reserves and the first team.

Macheda's 2009–10 season began with appearances in the third and fourth rounds of the League Cup, against Wolverhampton Wanderers and Barnsley respectively. He made his Champions League debut against CSKA Moscow on 3 November, followed by another appearance in the 1–0 defeat to Beşiktaş on 25 November, in which he forced a save from the goalkeeper in the last minute. He came on as a substitute for Berbatov in the League Cup fifth round on 1 December, before signing a four-year contract the next day that would tie him to the club until June 2014.

Towards the end of the year, Macheda suffered an injury that kept him out until 21 January, when he returned for a reserve match against Sunderland. However, he picked up another injury soon after, meaning that he missed out on the win over Aston Villa in the League Cup Final. He made his first Premier League appearance of the season in the 4–0 win over Bolton on 27 March, replacing Ryan Giggs in the 84th minute. With Wayne Rooney suffering ankle ligament damage against Bayern Munich in the Champions League, Macheda was named on the bench for United's top-of-the-table clash at home to Chelsea on 3 April. With United 1–0 down, Macheda came on for Paul Scholes in the 72nd minute; Chelsea scored a second goal in the 79th minute, before Macheda scored a consolation goal for the home side two minutes later, although there was a suspicion of handball as he turned the ball into the net.

On 28 July 2010, Macheda scored his first goals of United's pre-season tour of North America as he netted twice in the 2010 MLS All-Star Game. The first came after just 21 seconds as he capitalised on a poor back-pass and the second came in the 13th minute with a header from a Nani corner kick. On 13 November 2010, Macheda scored his first goal of the season, netting United's first goal in a 2–2 away draw against Aston Villa.

==== Sampdoria loan ====
On 8 January 2011, Sampdoria confirmed Macheda had joined on loan until the end of the season. He was seen as a temporary replacement for Antonio Cassano, who had left to join Milan. Macheda made his debut for Sampdoria on 9 January in a 2–1 home victory over Roma. On 19 January, Macheda scored his first and only Sampdoria goal on his first start for the club, as he opened the scoring in their Coppa Italia tie against Udinese. Sampdoria won 5–4 in a penalty shootout as the game had ended 2–2 after extra time. Unfortunately, the club's poor performances led to their relegation to Serie B. Following their relegation, Macheda's agent said he could make a return to Sampdoria, but the player himself ruled out a return to Italy in the 2011–12 season and stated that he would remain at Manchester United.

==== Return to Manchester United ====
Macheda returned to Manchester United at the end of the season having made 14 appearances in Sampdoria's unsuccessful battle against relegation. Upon his return, he expressed his wish to continue his football education in England, saying "For a youngster, England is a better place to play." Macheda then scored two goals against the New England Revolution in the first game of Manchester United's 2011 tour of the United States. Macheda played his first game of the 2011–12 season in Manchester United's 3–0 win over Leeds United in the League Cup, and scored from the penalty spot in the 2–1 loss to Crystal Palace in the quarter-final of that competition.

==== Queens Park Rangers loan ====
On 2 January 2012, Macheda was loaned out to fellow Premier League club Queens Park Rangers for the rest of the season. On the same day, he played his first game, coming on as a substitute for Heiðar Helguson in the 80th minute in the 2–1 loss to Norwich City at Loftus Road. On 28 March, Macheda returned to Manchester United for treatment after an ankle injury which ended his season.

==== 2012–13 season ====
Macheda returned to Manchester United for pre-season training and was chosen to take part in the club's tour of South Africa. He scored the only goal in a 1–0 victory over AmaZulu at the start of the tour. Since then, he did not feature in any league games for United.

==== VfB Stuttgart loan ====
On 24 January 2013, Macheda was loaned to VfB Stuttgart until the end of the season. The German club's sporting director Fredi Bobic announced that Manchester United promised Stuttgart an option of purchase, but they did not use any such option.

==== Doncaster Rovers loan ====
On 16 September 2013, Macheda joined Doncaster Rovers on a one-month loan. He made his debut the following day in Doncaster Rovers' away loss to Watford, coming on as a substitute for David Cotterill in the 58th minute. He scored his first goals for Doncaster when he struck twice against Nottingham Forest on 21 September 2013 in a 2–2 draw. This was the first time he scored since November 2010. The following week, he scored again, the only goal in the derby against local rivals Sheffield Wednesday; this made it three goals in as many appearances for his new club. On 8 October 2013, Macheda returned to Manchester United after a hamstring injury. After recovering from his injury, Macheda returned to Doncaster for a separate loan spell, lasting until the end of December 2013.

==== Birmingham City loan ====
On 31 January 2014, Macheda became the third Manchester United youngster to join Championship club Birmingham City on loan until the end of the 2013–14 season, after Tyler Blackett and Tom Thorpe. He replaced Lee Novak after an hour of the following day's match, at home to Derby County, and scored in stoppage time after Emyr Huws' shot had hit the post, to make the final score 3–3. At home to Burnley on 12 March, Macheda replaced Olly Lee after 60 minutes with Birmingham 1–0 down. He equalised four minutes later, and his 94th-minute second gave his team a 3–3 draw, despite opposition claims that he had used his arm to control the ball. He finished the season as Birmingham's top league goalscorer, with ten goals from just ten starts and eight appearances as a substitute.

=== Cardiff City ===
After being released from Manchester United, Macheda signed for newly relegated Championship club Cardiff City on a free transfer on 27 May 2014. He was signed by Ole Gunnar Solskjær, his former manager at United's reserves. He made his Cardiff debut in the second round of the League Cup away to Port Vale on 26 August 2014, and marked the occasion with his first two competitive goals for the club, as they progressed to the third round with a 3–2 victory. Macheda received his first red card for Cardiff on 14 March 2015 against Brentford for a second yellow after scoring an equaliser earlier in the match.

Having made no league starts and very few substitute appearances in 2015–16, Macheda joined fellow Championship club Nottingham Forest on loan until the end of the season; the move was completed on 15 March, and he went straight into the starting eleven for that night's game, a 1–1 draw away to Hull City.

Upon his return, he was left out of the pre-season tour of Germany and was placed on the transfer list by new manager Paul Trollope. On 30 August 2016, Macheda's contract was cancelled by mutual consent.

=== Novara ===
On 14 December 2016, he joined Serie B side Novara on an 18-month contract; he was awarded the club's number 10 shirt. On 25 February 2017, Macheda scored his first goal for Novara in Serie B in a 2–1 home win over Spezia; this was his first Italian league goal, and the first goal he had managed for an Italian team since 2011, when he scored for Sampdoria in the Coppa Italia. On 17 April, he scored his first brace in six years in a 3–2 away win over Frosinone. Macheda left the club when his contract expired at the end of the 2017–18 season.

=== Panathinaikos ===
Macheda signed a three-year contract with Super League Greece club Panathinaikos in September 2018. In his first season, he scored eleven goals (ten in the league and one in the Greek Cup against Panetolikos) in 28 appearances.

He started the 2019–20 season with a goal in a 1–1 away draw against Lamia and a week later added another in a 3–1 home defeat against OFI. His brace against Volos on 1 March 2020 took him to 13 goals in all competitions, equalling his best for a single season. His goal in the first match back from the three-month COVID-19 pandemic suspension set a new personal best, and he finished the season with 15.

In September 2020, Macheda agreed a contract extension until the summer of 2023. On 19 December 2021, he completed 100 appearances for the club, becoming the 13th foreign player to achieve the milestone.

=== Ankaragücü ===
In summer 2022, after four years in Greece, Macheda signed a two-year contract with newly promoted Turkish Süper Lig club Ankaragücü.

On 24 January 2023, he joined Cypriot First Division club APOEL on loan until the end of the season.

=== Asteras Tripolis ===
On 30 September 2024, Macheda returned to Greece and joined Asteras Tripolis as a free agent on an initial one-year deal.

== International career ==
Macheda was named in Italy's preliminary 40-man squad for the 2009 UEFA European Under-21 Championship, but was omitted from the final 23. He made his debut for the Italy U21s on 12 August 2009 in a friendly against Russia, and first scored for the U21s with both goals in a 2–1 victory over Turkey on 17 November 2010. He scored the only goal in a 1–0 win over England with a late penalty in February 2011, and in their next game, he scored Italy's third in a 3–1 win over Sweden in March.

== Style of play ==
Nicknamed Chicco, Macheda is a quick and versatile forward, who is capable of playing in a central role as a main striker, or in more of a supporting role as a second striker or attacking midfielder. Although naturally right-footed, he possesses an accurate and powerful shot with both feet, and is known in particular for his clinical finishing, intelligent movement, and ability to curl shots on goal from outside the area. He has been described as a "modern striker", as his technical skills, ability to read the game, and positional sense in the box, combined with his tall, large and strong physique, allow him to hold up the ball with his back to goal, retain possession under pressure, and create space for himself even in limited spaces and when being heavily marked by more physical opponents. Regarded as one of Italy's most promising prospects in his youth, in 2010 Don Balón included him in their list of the 100 best young players born after 1989; in recent seasons, however, he has often struggled to live up to his potential.

== Personal life ==
Early in the morning of 12 July 2009, Macheda's home in Sale, Greater Manchester was targeted by burglars, who stole cash and jewellery. A friend of his received a minor head wound during the burglary.

While on loan at Queens Park Rangers in 2012, Macheda was involved in two cases of misconduct on Twitter.

== Career statistics ==
As of match played 15 May 2026

Appearances and goals by club, season and competition
Club	Season	League			National cup (Note: Includes FA Cup, Coppa Italia, DFB-Pokal, Greek Cup, Turkish Cup and Cypriot Cup)		League cup (Note: Includes League Cup)		Europe		Total	
Club	Season	Division	Apps	Goals	Apps	Goals	Apps	Goals	Apps	Goals	Apps	Goals
Manchester United	2008–09	Premier League	4	2	1	0	0	0	0	0	5	2
Manchester United	2009–10	Premier League	5	1	0	0	3	0	2 (Note: Appearance(s) in UEFA Champions League)	0	10	1
Manchester United	2010–11	Premier League	7	1	—		3	0	2	0	12	1
Manchester United	2011–12	Premier League	3	0	—		2	1	1	0	6	1
Manchester United	2012–13	Premier League	0	0	0	0	1	0	2	0	3	0
Manchester United	2013–14	Premier League	0	0	0	0	0	0	0	0	0	0
Manchester United	Total		19	4	1	0	9	1	7	0	36	5
Sampdoria (loan)	2010–11	Serie A	14	0	2	1	—		—		16	1
Queens Park Rangers (loan)	2011–12	Premier League	3	0	3	0	—		—		6	0
VfB Stuttgart (loan)	2012–13	Bundesliga	14	0	1	0	—		3 (Note: Appearances in UEFA Europa League)	0	18	0
Doncaster Rovers (loan)	2013–14	Championship	15	3	—		—		—		15	3
Birmingham City (loan)	2013–14	Championship	18	10	—		—		—		18	10
Cardiff City	2014–15	Championship	21	6	2	0	2	2	—		25	8
Cardiff City	2015–16	Championship	6	0	1	0	1	0	—		8	0
Cardiff City	2016–17	Championship	0	0	—		0	0	—		0	0
Cardiff City	Total		27	6	3	0	3	2	—		33	8
Nottingham Forest (loan)	2015–16	Championship	3	0	—		—		—		3	0
Novara	2016–17	Serie B	21	7	—		—		—		21	7
Novara	2017–18	Serie B	30	3	1	1	—		—		31	4
Novara	Total		51	10	1	1	—		—		52	11
Panathinaikos	2018–19	Super League Greece	26	10	2	1	—		—		28	11
Panathinaikos	2019–20	Super League Greece	33	14	4	1	—		—		37	15
Panathinaikos	2020–21	Super League Greece	31	9	2	1	—		—		33	10
Panathinaikos	2021–22	Super League Greece	16	3	2	1	—		—		18	4
Panathinaikos	Total		106	36	10	4	—		—		116	40
Ankaragücü	2022–23	Süper Lig	11	0	2	1	—		—		13	1
Ankaragücü	2023–24	Süper Lig	21	3	7	2	—		—		28	5
Ankaragücü	Total		32	3	9	3	—		—		41	6
APOEL (loan)	2022–23	Cypriot First Division	15	2	2	0	—		—		17	2
Asteras Tripolis	2024–25	Super League Greece	22	6	5	0	—		—		27	6
Asteras Tripolis	2025–26	Super League Greece	30	8	3	0	—		—		33	8
Asteras Tripolis	Total		52	14	8	0	—		—		60	14
Career total			369	88	41	9	12	3	10	0	431	99

== Honours ==
Manchester United

- Football League Cup: 2009–10

Panathinaikos

- Greek Cup: 2021–22

Individual

- Jimmy Murphy Academy Player of the Year: 2008–09
