= Lefktra =

Village in Boeotia, Greece

Lefktra Λεύκτρα
- Community
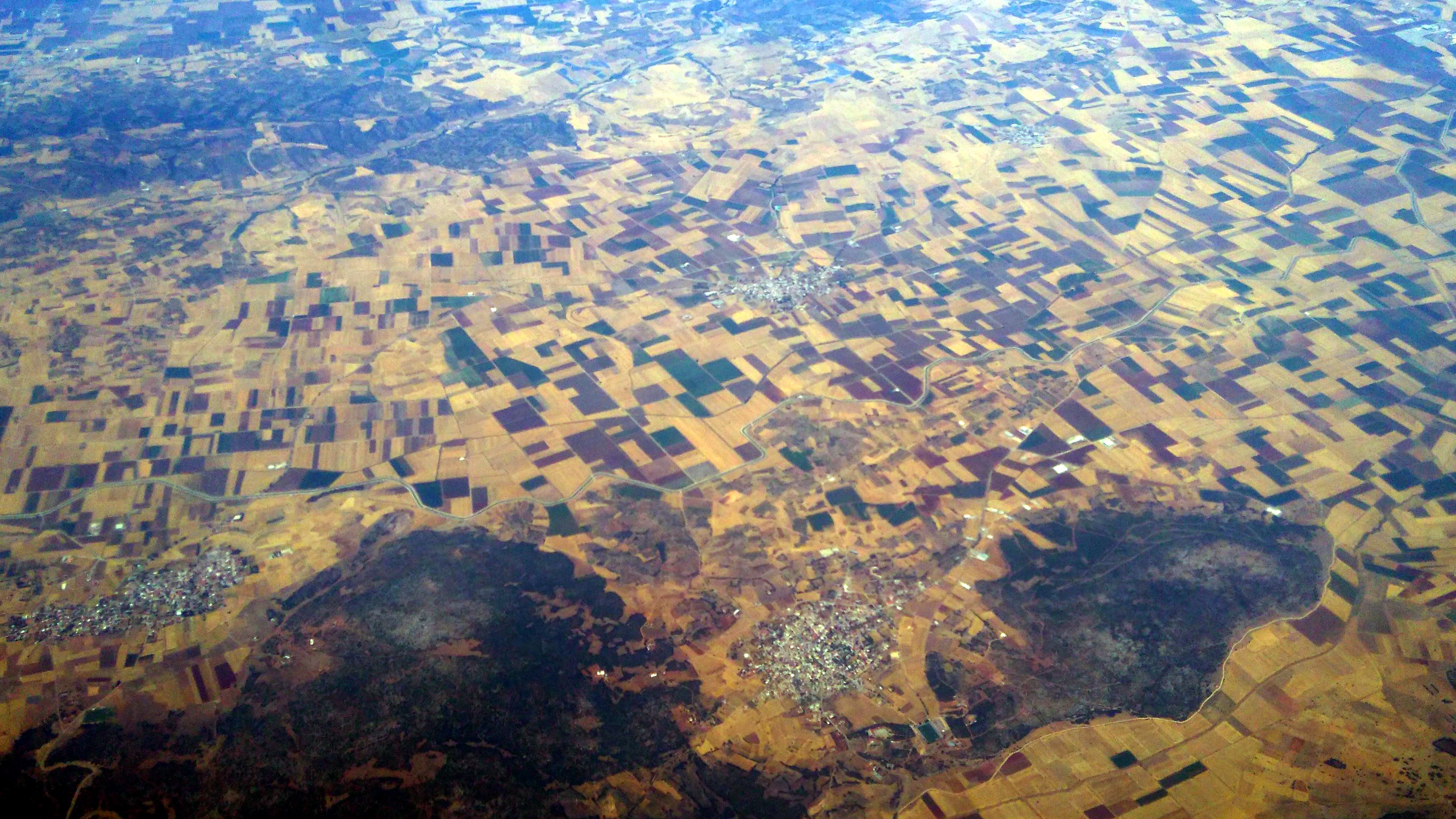

- Location within Greece
- Coordinates: 38°15′16″N 23°10′56″E
- Country: Greece
- Administrative region: Central Greece
- Regional unit: Boeotia
- Municipality: Thebes
- Municipal unit: Plataies

Population (2021)
  - Community: 779
- Time zone: UTC+2 (EET)
  - Summer (DST): UTC+3 (EEST)

Lefktra (Greek: Λεύκτρα, romanized: Léfktra, Modern Greek: [ˈlefk.tra]) is a village in the regional unit of Boeotia, Greece, and a part of the municipality of Thebes. Before 1915, its name was Parapoungia (Greek: Παραπούγγια). Lefktra is located in the foothills of Mount Kithairon at 353 meters average elevation. The population of Lefktra is 779 people (2021 census). Thebes is sixteen kilometers away and Athens 70 km away, via the old national road. There are bus lines from Thebes to Lefktra and vice versa daily, and from Athens to Lefktra at the weekends. Residents' main occupations are agriculture and stockbreeding. Livadostra and Koromili beaches are ten minutes away by car.

Between 1912 and 1997 Lefktra was an independent community (an independent municipality after 1989). In 1997, at the Kapodistrias reform, it was merged into the municipality Plataies, along with the communities Melissochori, Loutoufi and Kaparelli. In 2010, at the Kallikratis reform, Plataies was merged into the municipality of Thebes.

== Etymology ==
Lefktra is named after the ancient village of Leuctra (Ancient Greek: Λεῦκτρα, romanized: Leûktra, Attic Greek: [lêu̯k.tra]) in ancient Boeotia, seven miles southwest of Thebes.

== Defeat of Sparta ==
The Battle of Leuctra (371 BC) was fought in the vicinity of ancient Leuctra, in which the Thebans under Epaminondas defeated the Spartans, ending the Spartan hegemony. Following their victory, the Thebans became a new power within the Hellenic world, until the rise of Macedonia. The base of Theban Tropaion (Trophy) tower, erected at the battle site circa 371BC.38.2647°N 23.1740°E.
