= Anastasios Chatzigiovanis =

Greek footballer (born 1997)

Tasos Chatzigiovanis
Personal information
- Full name: Anastasios Chatzigiovanis
- Date of birth: 31 May 1997 (age 29)
- Place of birth: Mytilene, Greece
- Height: 1.77 m (5 ft 10 in)
- Position: Winger

Team information
- Current team: OFI
- Number: 7

Youth career
- –2013: APA Odysseas Elytis
- 2013–2017: Panathinaikos

Senior career*
Years	Team	Apps	(Gls)
2016–2022	Panathinaikos	142	(16)
2022–2024	Ankaragucu	58	(3)
2024–2025	Eyupspor	6	(0)
2025	→ Asteras Tripolis (loan)	10	(2)
2025–2026	Omonia	27	(5)
2026–	OFI	2	(0)

International career^{‡}
2017–2018	Greece U21	12	(1)
2020–	Greece	15	(0)
- * Club domestic league appearances and goals as of 20 September 2026 ‡ National team caps and goals as of 10 September 2024

Anastasios Chatzigiovanis (Greek: Αναστάσιος Χατζηγιοβάνης; born 31 May 1997) is a Greek professional footballer who plays as a winger for Super League club OFI and the Greece national team.

== Career ==
=== Panathinaikos ===
Chatzigiovanis plays mainly as a winger and joined Panathinaikos from the youth ranks of the club in the summer of 2016. Coach Andrea Stramaccioni gave Chatzigiovanis a debut as a late substitute in a 0–3 home defeat to Standard Liège in the UEFA Europa League.

Chatzigiovanis was mostly used as a substitute by Marinos Ouzounidis in the 2017–18 season. On 18 September 2018, in a 3–1 away win against AEL, Chatzigiovanis scored his first Super League goal with a last-minute penalty.

On 29 September 2018, Chatzigiovanis scored his second with a header after Ousmane Coulibaly's assist in a 2–1 home win against PAS Giannina. On 2 December, he scored with a penalty kick in stoppage time to secure a 1–1 draw away to Aris. On 5 May 2019, the last matchday of the season, he opened the scoring with a penalty kick in a 4–0 home win against Panetolikos.

In October 2019, Chatzigiovanis signed a new three-year contract with Panathinaikos; it was reported that the player had insisted on a release clause being included. On the same day he scored the only goal of a 1–0 away win against Atromitos. He crossed for Juan José Perea's goal against AEK Athens on 10 November 2019 that helped the team come back from a 2–0 deficit to win 3–2. On 1 December 2019, he scored with a penalty kick, sealing a 1–0 home win against Asteras Tripolis. A week later he scored with another penalty kick, sealing a 1–1 away draw against Volos. On 14 December 2019, he opened the scoring with another penalty kick in a 2–0 home win game against Lamia. On 25 January 2020, scored with a penalty kick in a 2–0 away win against AEL. On 2 February 2020, Chatzigiovanis scored in a 2–0 home win derby against reigning Super League champions PAOK, as he took advantage of Sverrir Ingi Ingason, and the Greek international forward clipped the ball over Živko Živković, when clean through one-on-one with the visiting keeper. On 1 March 2020, Chatzigiovanis scored with a kick in a 4–1 home win game against Volos.

In July 2021, Panathinaikos accepted a second official approach from the Turkish club Altay S.K. for the transfer of the international midfielder. The new transfer bid was at €1 million, increased by €400,000 compared to their first attempt, but Panathinaikos again responded negatively, clarifying that the transfer is possible only if the proposal reached €1.5 million, his (unofficial) clause. On 26 September 2021, he scored with a wonderful kick, his first goal of the season, after an assist from Carlitos, in a 5–1 home win game against Volos.

=== MKE Ankaragücü ===
On 24 May 2022, Turkish Süper Lig football Club MKE Ankaragücü, announced the signing of Chatzigiovanis for two years. There was no transfer fee paid to his previous team Panathinaikos since his contract with them had already expired. Chatzigiovanis spent 6 years in the senior team of Panathinaikos after progressing through their youth academy.

== Career statistics ==
=== Club ===
As of 30 May 2024

Appearances and goals by club, season and competition
Club	Season	League			National cup (Note: Includes Greek Cup, Turkish Cup)		Europe		Total	
Club	Season	Division	Apps	Goals	Apps	Goals	Apps	Goals	Apps	Goals
Panathinaikos	2016–17	Super League Greece	9	0	5	1	1 (Note: Appearance(s) in UEFA Europa League)	0	15	1
Panathinaikos	2017–18	Super League Greece	17	0	4	0	3	0	24	0
Panathinaikos	2018–19	Super League Greece	27	4	3	0	—		30	4
Panathinaikos	2019–20	Super League Greece	32	8	4	0	—		36	8
Panathinaikos	2020–21	Super League Greece	29	3	2	0	—		31	3
Panathinaikos	2021–22	Super League Greece	28	1	4	0	—		32	1
Panathinaikos	Total		142	16	22	1	4	0	168	17
Ankaragücü	2022–23	Süper Lig	25	1	6	2	—		31	3
Ankaragücü	2023–24	Süper Lig	33	2	7	2	—		40	4
Ankaragücü	Total		58	3	13	4	0	0	71	7
Career total			200	19	30	5	4	0	239	24

=== International ===
As of match played 10 September 2024

Appearances and goals by national team and year
National team	Year	Apps	Goals
Greece
Greece	2020	2	0
Greece	2022	8	0
Greece	2023	3	0
Greece	2024	2	0
Total		15	0

== Honours ==
Panathinaikos

- Greek Cup: 2021–22

Omonia

- Cypriot First Division: 2025–26

Individual

- Panathinaikos Player of the Season: 2019–20
