= Vangelis Theocharis =

Greek association footballer

Personal information
- Full name: Evangelos Theocharis
- Date of birth: 6 July 1998 (age 28)
- Place of birth: Livadeia, Greece
- Height: 1.81 m (5 ft 11 in)
- Position: Defensive midfielder

Team information
- Current team: Ethnikos Latsion
- Number: 23

Youth career
- 2010–2018: Panathinaikos

Senior career*
Years	Team	Apps	(Gls)
2018–2022	Panathinaikos	8	(0)
2020–2021	→ Levadiakos (loan)	9	(3)
2021–2022	Panathinaikos B	25	(1)
2022–2023	Apollon Smyrnis	10	(1)
2025–	Ethnikos Latsion	25	(0)
- * Club domestic league appearances and goals as of 3 May 2026

Vangelis Theocharis (Greek: Βαγγέλης Θεοχάρης, born 6 July 1998) is a Greek professional footballer who plays as a defender for Cypriot Second Division club Ethnikos Latsion.

== Career ==
=== Panathinaikos ===
Theocharis plays mainly as a defender and joined Panathinaikos from the team's youth ranks.
