= 2023–24 Puskás Akadémia FC season =

Puskás Akadémia
2023–24 season
- Chairman: Balázs Tóth
- Manager: Zsolt Hornyák
- Stadium: Pancho Aréna
- Nemzeti Bajnokság I: 3rd
- Magyar Kupa: Round of 32
- Top goalscorer: League: Zsolt Nagy (11); All: Zsolt Nagy (11)
- Highest home attendance: 3,700 v Újpest (4 August 2023, Nemzeti Bajnokság I)
- Lowest home attendance: 1,000 v Kecskemét (8 December 2023, Nemzeti Bajnokság I)
- Average home league attendance: 2,017
- Biggest win: 5–0 v MTK (Away, 22 October 2023, Nemzeti Bajnokság I); 6–1 v MTK (Home, 18 February 2024, Nemzeti Bajnokság I); 5–0 v Paks (Home, 20 April 2024, Nemzeti Bajnokság I)
- Biggest defeat: 1–4 v Kecskemét (Away, 26 August 2023, Nemzeti Bajnokság I)
Home colours	Away colours	Third colours

The 2023–24 season was Puskás Akadémia Football Club's 10th competitive season, 7th consecutive season in the Nemzeti Bajnokság I and 12th year in existence as a football club. In addition to the domestic league, Puskás Akadémia participated in that season's editions of the Magyar Kupa.

== Squad ==
Squad at end of season

Note: Flags indicate national team as defined under FIFA eligibility rules; some limited exceptions apply. Players may hold more than one non-FIFA nationality.

No.	Pos.	Nation	Player
5	DF	HUN	Bence Batik
7	FW	HUN	György Komáromi
9	FW	GAM	Lamin Colley
10	FW	SWE	Jonathan Levi
11	FW	NED	Luciano Slagveer
14	DF	POL	Wojciech Golla
15	MF	CZE	Jakub Plšek
16	MF	FIN	Urho Nissilä
17	DF	CZE	Patrizio Stronati
18	MF	ROU	Marius Corbu
19	MF	UKR	Artem Favorov
20	FW	FIN	Mikael Soisalo
21	FW	CRO	Jakov Puljić
22	DF	HUN	Roland Szolnoki
23	DF	SUI	Quentin Maceiras

No.	Pos.	Nation	Player
24	GK	HUN	Tamás Markek
25	DF	HUN	Zsolt Nagy
27	MF	HUN	Gergő Ominger
31	DF	HUN	Zsombor Bévárdi
33	DF	ENG	Brandon Ormonde-Ottewill
42	FW	HUN	Kevin Mondovics
60	FW	UKR	Oleh Yablonskyi
66	DF	HUN	Ákos Markgráf
71	MF	HUN	Patrik Posztobányi
72	GK	HUN	Bendegúz Lehoczki
73	MF	HUN	Szabolcs Dusinszki
76	DF	HUN	Barna Pál
88	MF	HUN	Bence Vékony
91	GK	HUN	Ármin Pécsi

== Transfers ==
=== Transfers in ===
Transfer window	Pos.	No.	Player	From
Summer	DF	23	(Switzerland) Quentin Maceiras	(Switzerland) Young Boys
Winter	MF	16	(Finland) Urho Nissilä	(Finland) KuPS
Winter	DF	31	(Hungary) Zsombor Bévárdi	Debrecen

=== Transfers out ===
Transfer window	Pos.	No.	Player	To
Summer	DF	—	(Hungary) Áron Alaxai	Nyíregyháza
Summer	MF	6	(Netherlands) Yoëll van Nieff	Released (Note: Joined Mumbai City.)
Summer	MF	7	(Hungary) Tamás Kiss	Released (Note: Joined Újpest.)
Summer	MF	10	(Romania) Alexandru Băluță	Released (Note: Joined FCSB.)
Summer	DF	23	(Hungary) Csaba Spandler	Released (Note: Joined Fehérvár.)
Winter	DF	2	(Belgium) Mohamed Mezghrani	Released (Note: Joined Warta Poznań.)
Winter	FW	30	(Hungary) Zsombor Gruber	Ferencváros

=== Loans in ===
Transfer window	Pos.	No.	Player	From	End date

=== Loans out ===
Transfer window	Pos.	No.	Player	To	End date
Summer	MF	—	(Hungary) Kevin Körmendi	Kisvárda	End of season
Summer	MF	—	(Hungary) Dominik Kocsis	Tiszakécske	End of season
Summer	MF	—	(Hungary) Gergely Mim	Zalaegerszeg	End of season
Summer	MF	32	(Hungary) Márton Radics	Szeged	Middle of season
Summer	DF	43	(Ukraine) Artem Nahirnyi	Mezőkövesd	Middle of season
Summer	MF	67	(Hungary) Balázs Bakti	Vasas	End of season
Winter	MF	73	(Hungary) Szabolcs Dusinszki	Csákvár	End of season
Winter	GK	74	(Hungary) Martin Auerbach	Mosonmagyaróvár	End of season

== Competitions ==
=== Overview ===
Competition	First match	Last match	Starting round	Final position	Record							
Competition	First match	Last match	Starting round	Final position	Pld	W	D	L	GF	GA	GD	Win %
Nemzeti Bajnokság I	29 July 2023	18 May 2024	Matchday 1	3rd	33	15	10	8	60	35	+25	45.45
Magyar Kupa	16 September 2023	1 November 2023	Round of 64	Round of 32	2	1	0	1	5	4	+1	50.00
Total					35	16	10	9	65	39	+26	45.71

Source: Competitions

=== Nemzeti Bajnokság I ===
==== League table ====
Pos	Team	Pld	W	D	L	GF	GA	GD	Pts	Qualification or relegation
1	Ferencváros (C)	33	23	5	5	80	30	+50	74	Qualification for the Champions League second qualifying round
2	Paks	33	17	7	9	51	42	+9	58	Qualification for the Europa League first qualifying round (Note: Paks qualified for the Europa League first qualifying round by winning the 2023–24 Magyar Kupa. Since they qualified based on league position, the second Conference League second round spot was passed to the fourth-placed team.)
3	Puskás Akadémia	33	15	10	8	60	35	+25	55	Qualification for the Conference League second qualifying round
4	Fehérvár	33	16	6	11	55	40	+15	54	Qualification for the Conference League second qualifying round
5	Debrecen	33	14	6	13	49	48	+1	48	

Source: Hungarian Football Federation (in Hungarian), Soccerway
Rules for classification: 1) Points; 2) Matches won; 3) Goal difference; 4) Goals scored; 5) Head-to-head points; 6) Head-to-head goal difference; 7) Fair play ranking; 8) Drawing of lots.
(C) Champions

==== Results summary ====
Overall								Home						Away					
Pld	W	D	L	GF	GA	GD	Pts	W	D	L	GF	GA	GD	W	D	L	GF	GA	GD
33	15	10	8	60	35	+25	55	6	7	3	30	16	+14	9	3	5	30	19	+11

Source: Hungarian Football Federation

==== Results by round ====
Round	1	2	3	4	5	6	7	8	9	10	11	12	13	14	15	16	17	18	19	20	21	22	23	24	25	26	27	28	29	30	31	32	33
Ground	A	H	A	H	A	A	H	A	H	A	H	H	A	H	A	H	H	A	H	A	H	A	A	H	A	H	A	A	H	A	H	A	H
Result	W	D	W	D	L	W	L	D	W	W	D	D	W	D	L	W	D	L	L	W	W	L	D	L	D	D	W	W	W	L	W	W	W
Position	5	4	1	4	7	5	6	7	5	4	4	4	3	3	5	4	4	5	6	4	4	4	4	4	5	5	4	4	4	4	4	4	3
Points	3	4	7	8	8	11	11	12	15	18	19	20	23	24	24	27	28	28	28	31	34	34	35	35	36	37	40	43	46	46	49	52	55

Source: Matches
A = Away; H = Home; W = Win; D = Draw; L = Loss

==== Matches ====
29 July 2023 1	Diósgyőr	0–1	Puskás Akadémia	Miskolc
18:00 CEST (UTC+2)	Edomwonyi (yellow card) 88'; Vallejo (yellow card) 88'; Gera (yellow card) 90+1'	Report	Corbu (yellow card) 1'; Slagveer 10'; Szolnoki (yellow card) 58'; Maceiras (yellow card) 83'; Golla (yellow card) 90+5'	Stadium: Diósgyőri Stadion; Attendance: 7,579; Referee: Balázs Berke

4 August 2023 2	Puskás Akadémia	3–3	Újpest	Felcsút
20:00 CEST (UTC+2)	Colley 20', 37', (yellow card) 77'; Levi 40'; Szolnoki (yellow card) 75'; Ormonde-Ottewill (yellow card) 78'	Report	Ljujić 32' (pen.), 46', 63'; Tamás (yellow card) 54'	Stadium: Pancho Aréna; Attendance: 3,700; Referee: Csaba Pintér

13 August 2023 3	Ferencváros	1–2	Puskás Akadémia	Budapest
18:45 CEST (UTC+2)	Ben Romdhane (yellow card) 56'; Cissé (yellow card) 65'; Lisztes 90+5'	Report	Golla 12', (yellow card) 18'; Plšek 29'; Slagveer (yellow card) 34'; Szolnoki (yellow card) 54'; Colley (yellow card) 65'; Ormonde-Ottewill (yellow card) 75'; Markek (yellow card) 84'	Stadium: Groupama Arena; Attendance: 10,527; Referee: Ferenc Karakó

18 August 2023 4	Puskás Akadémia	2–2	Fehérvár	Felcsút
18:00 CEST (UTC+2)	Plšek 11', 75'; Batik (yellow card) 69'; Szolnoki (yellow card) 87'; Gruber (yellow card) 90+9'	Report	Kalmár (yellow card) 18'; Kodro 40'; Serafimov (yellow card) 57'; Katona 90+5'	Stadium: Pancho Aréna; Attendance: 3,102; Referee: Sándor Andó-Szabó

26 August 2023 5	Kecskemét	4–1	Puskás Akadémia	Kecskemét
15:30 CEST (UTC+2)	K. Nagy 31' (pen.); Tóth (yellow card) 35', (goal) 67'; Szuhodovszki (yellow card) 45+1'; Horváth 45+9' (pen.), 57'; Szabó (yellow card) 84'; Májer (yellow card) 90+1'	Report	Plšek (yellow card) 29', (goal) 47' (pen.); Levi (yellow card) 62'	Stadium: Széktói Stadion; Attendance: 2,786; Referee: Tamás Bognár

3 September 2023 6	Mezőkövesd	1–3	Puskás Akadémia	Mezőkövesd
14:15 CEST (UTC+2)	Dražić 13'; Filip (yellow card) 16'; Beriashvili (yellow card) 60'	Report	Batik (yellow card) 30'; Komáromi (yellow card) 53'; Corbu (yellow card) 68'; Gomis 73' (o.g.); Soisalo 76'; Gruber 86'	Stadium: Városi Stadion; Attendance: 1,800; Referee: Ferenc Karakó

23 September 2023 7	Puskás Akadémia	0–2	Paks	Felcsút
14:30 CEST (UTC+2)	Hornyák (manager) (yellow card) 59'; Gruber (yellow card) 68'; Szolnoki (yellow card) 82'; Plšek (yellow card) 89'; Corbu (yellow card) 90+4'; Golla (yellow card) 90+5'	Report	Haraszti 39' (pen.), (yellow card) 55'; Könyves 66'; Horváth (yellow card) 88'	Stadium: Pancho Aréna; Attendance: 1,510; Referee: Ádám Farkas

29 September 2023 8	Zalaegerszeg	1–1	Puskás Akadémia	Zalaegerszeg
20:00 CEST (UTC+2)	Evangelou (yellow card) 56'; Mance (yellow card) 64'; Csóka (yellow card) 87'; Špoljarić 90+8'	Report	Ormonde-Ottewill (yellow card) 54'; Maceiras (yellow card) 76'; Plšek 88' (pen.); Nagy (yellow card) 90+5'	Stadium: ZTE Arena; Attendance: 2,872; Referee: Sándor Andó-Szabó

6 October 2023 9	Puskás Akadémia	1–0	Kisvárda	Felcsút
20:30 CEST (UTC+2)	Gruber (yellow card) 38'; Ormonde-Ottewill (yellow card) 40'; Golla 57'; Komáromi (yellow card) 90'; Szolnoki (yellow card) 90+2'	Report	Lippai (yellow card) 34'; Jovičić (red card) 74'	Stadium: Pancho Aréna; Attendance: 1,120; Referee: Tamás Bognár

22 October 2023 10	MTK	0–5	Puskás Akadémia	Budapest
13:15 CEST (UTC+2)	Stieber (yellow card) 48'	Report	Batik 10'; Gruber 38'; Corbu (yellow card) 58', (goal) 65'; Nagy 74'; Favorov 90+1'	Stadium: Hidegkuti Nándor Stadion; Attendance: 2,625; Referee: Péter Antal

28 October 2023 11	Puskás Akadémia	1–1	Debrecen	Felcsút
17:00 CEST (UTC+2)	Gruber 37'; Szolnoki (yellow card) 74'	Report	Dzsudzsák 16'	Stadium: Pancho Aréna; Attendance: 1,721; Referee: Csaba Pintér

4 November 2023 12	Puskás Akadémia	0–0	Diósgyőr	Felcsút
15:45 CET (UTC+1)	Nagy (yellow card) 15'; Golla (yellow card) 44'	Report	Vallejo (yellow card) 61'; Chorbadzhiyski (yellow card) 83'	Stadium: Pancho Aréna; Attendance: 1,680; Referee: Marcell Derdák

11 November 2023 13	Újpest	1–2	Puskás Akadémia	Budapest
19:30 CET (UTC+1)	Ambrose 15'	Report	Favorov 19', 90'; Maceiras (yellow card) 35'; Golla (yellow card) 57'	Stadium: Szusza Ferenc Stadion; Attendance: 4,187; Referee: István Vad

26 November 2023 14	Puskás Akadémia	1–1	Ferencváros	Felcsút
17:00 CET (UTC+1)	Szolnoki (yellow card) 42'; Colley (yellow card) 45', (goal) 57'; Nagy (yellow card) 60'; Stronati (yellow card) 78'; Maceiras (yellow card) 84'	Report	Zachariassen 18'	Stadium: Pancho Aréna; Attendance: 3,525; Referee: Gergő Bogár

2 December 2023 15	Fehérvár	3–1	Puskás Akadémia	Székesfehérvár
15:30 CET (UTC+1)	Kodro 6', 76' (pen.); Katona (yellow card) 23'; Christensen 34', (yellow card) 83'; Szabó (yellow card) 44'; Flores (yellow card) 57'	Report	Nagy (yellow card) 26'; Colley 58'	Stadium: Sóstói Stadion; Attendance: 2,172; Referee: Tamás Bognár

8 December 2023 16	Puskás Akadémia	3–0	Kecskemét	Felcsút
20:00 CET (UTC+1)	Favorov (yellow card) 18'; Colley 22'; Z. Nagy 69', 89'; Soisalo (yellow card) 73'	Report	Horváth (yellow card) 27'; Vágó (yellow card) 54'; Varga (yellow card) 89'	Stadium: Pancho Aréna; Attendance: 1,000; Referee: Ferenc Karakó

17 December 2023 17	Puskás Akadémia	0–0	Mezőkövesd	Felcsút
18:00 CET (UTC+1)	Colley (yellow card) 53'	Report	Cseke (yellow card) 23'	Stadium: Pancho Aréna; Attendance: 1,023; Referee: Marcell Derdák

4 February 2024 18	Paks	2–1	Puskás Akadémia	Paks
17:30 CET (UTC+1)	Hahn (yellow card) 18'; Balogh (yellow card) 35'; Windecker 40'; Lenzsér 57'; Kovács (yellow card) 62'	Report	Komáromi 52'; Golla (yellow card) 56'	Stadium: Fehérvári úti Stadion; Attendance: 2,001; Referee: Balázs Berke

7 February 2024 19	Puskás Akadémia	0–1	Zalaegerszeg	Felcsút
20:00 CET (UTC+1)		Report	Mance 15' (pen.)	Stadium: Pancho Aréna; Attendance: 1,234; Referee: József Erdős

10 February 2024 20	Kisvárda	0–2	Puskás Akadémia	Kisvárda
12:30 CET (UTC+1)	Jovičić (yellow card) 40'; Lippai (yellow card) 58'; Filipović (yellow card) 74'	Report	Nagy 18'; Komáromi 35'; Soisalo (yellow card) 54'	Stadium: Várkerti Stadion; Attendance: 1,725; Referee: István Vad

18 February 2024 21	Puskás Akadémia	6–1	MTK	Felcsút
17:60 CET (UTC+1)	Zsolt Nagy 12', (yellow card) 42'; Stronati (yellow card) 20', (goal) 80'; Corbu 25'; Favorov 45+2'; Komáromi 54'; Maceiras (yellow card) 77'; Soisalo 90+2'	Report	Molnár 65'; Végh (red card) 82'; Hey (yellow card) 86'	Stadium: Pancho Aréna; Attendance: 1,231; Referee: Tamás Bognár

24 February 2024 22	Debrecen	1–0	Puskás Akadémia	Debrecen
17:30 CET (UTC+1)	Baranyai (yellow card) 35'; Szécsi 75'	Report	Batik (yellow card) 30'; Slagveer (yellow card) 90+2'	Stadium: Nagyerdei Stadion; Attendance: 4,132; Referee: Mihály Káprály

2 March 2024 23	Diósgyőr	1–1	Puskás Akadémia	Miskolc
18:45 CET (UTC+1)	Bitok (yellow card) 26'; Edomwonyi 49'; Jurek (yellow card) 56'	Report	Szolnoki (yellow card) 18'; Favorov (yellow card) 23'; Plšek 45'; Colley (yellow card) 70'	Stadium: Diósgyőri Stadion; Attendance: 4,805; Referee: Balázs Berke

8 March 2024 24	Puskás Akadémia	0–2	Újpest	Felcsút
20:00 CET (UTC+1)	Corbu (yellow card) 51'; Batik (yellow card) 70'	Report	Ambrose 10'; Keita (yellow card) 31'; Radošević (yellow card) 71'; Antzoulas 74'	Stadium: Pancho Aréna; Attendance: 2,300; Referee: Ferenc Karakó

17 March 2024 25	Ferencváros	1–1	Puskás Akadémia	Budapest
14:45 CET (UTC+1)	Botka (yellow card) 30'; Lončar (yellow card) 48'; B. Varga (yellow card) 53'; Marquinhos 77'; Abu Fani (yellow card) 78'	Report	Colley (yellow card) 28', (goal) 46'; Nagy (yellow card) 48'; Maceiras (yellow card) 88'; Ormonde-Ottewill (yellow card) 90+5'	Stadium: Groupama Arena; Attendance: 12,107; Referee: Gergő Bogár

29 March 2024 26	Puskás Akadémia	0–0	Fehérvár	Felcsút
20:00 CET (UTC+1)	Szolnoki (yellow card) 45'	Report	Fiola (yellow card) 36'; Gergényi (yellow card) 50'	Stadium: Pancho Aréna; Attendance: 3,617; Referee: József Erdős

7 April 2024 27	Kecskemét	1–2	Puskás Akadémia	Kecskemét
17:30 CEST (UTC+2)	Derekas (yellow card) 12'; Pálinkás 30'; Varga (yellow card) 52'; Vágó (yellow card) 60'	Report	Golla 74'; Batik (yellow card) 79'; Z. Nagy 86', (yellow card) 90+1'; Plšek (yellow card) 90'	Stadium: Széktói Stadion; Attendance: 3,358; Referee: Tamás Bognár

14 April 2024 28	Mezőkövesd	0–4	Puskás Akadémia	Mezőkövesd
18:45 CEST (UTC+2)		Report	Levi 28'; Puljić 41', 61'; Ormonde-Ottewill 45+3'	Stadium: Városi Stadion; Attendance: 1,498; Referee: Mihály Káprály

20 April 2024 29	Puskás Akadémia	5–0	Paks	Felcsút
14:30 CEST (UTC+2)	Nissilä 23'; Puljić (yellow card) 40', (goal) 60'; Nagy 73' (pen.); Ormonde-Ottewill (yellow card) 75'; Komáromi 80'; Colley (yellow card) 82'; Szolnoki 89'	Report	Kinyik (yellow card) 39'; Papp (yellow card) 41'; J. Szabó (yellow card) 59'; Osváth (yellow card) 71'	Stadium: Pancho Aréna; Attendance: 2,021; Referee: Csaba Pintér

26 April 2024 30	Zalaegerszeg	1–0	Puskás Akadémia	Zalaegerszeg
20:00 CEST (UTC+2)	Kiss (yellow card) 68'; Sajbán 71'	Report	Ormonde-Ottewill (yellow card) 90+6'	Stadium: ZTE Arena; Attendance: 2,559; Referee: Tamás Bognár

4 May 2024 31	Puskás Akadémia	4–2	Kisvárda	Felcsút
15:30 CEST (UTC+2)	Puljić 30'; Nagy 38', 50'; Komáromi 65'; Szolnoki (yellow card) 81'; Batik (yellow card) 89'	Report	Stefan (yellow card) 19'; Camaj (yellow card) 23'; Navrátil 43'; Ésik 90+1'; Matić (yellow card) 90+3'	Stadium: Pancho Aréna; Attendance: 1,310; Referee: Marcell Derdák

11 May 2024 32	MTK	1–3	Puskás Akadémia	Budapest
15:30 CEST (UTC+2)	Bognár (yellow card) 27'; Zsombor Nagy 37'	Report	Szolnoki 5'; Nissilä 12', 20'; Maceiras (yellow card) 27'; Colley (yellow card) 78'; Golla (yellow card) 89'	Stadium: Hidegkuti Nándor Stadion; Attendance: 2,562; Referee: Ferenc Karakó

18 May 2024 33	Puskás Akadémia	4–1	Debrecen	Felcsút
17:45 CEST (UTC+2)	Nagy 15' (pen.), 49'; Komáromi 36', 90', (yellow card) 73'; Plšek (yellow card) 47'; Colley (yellow card) 90+5'	Report	Manrique (red card) 24'; Tuboly (yellow card) 34'; Bódi 45+4'	Stadium: Pancho Aréna; Attendance: 2,181; Referee: Márton Rúsz

=== Magyar Kupa ===
16 September 2023 Round of 64	Mosonmagyaróvár	0–2	Puskás Akadémia	Mosonmagyaróvár
15:00 CEST (UTC+2)	Horváth (yellow card) 41'; Czingráber (yellow card) 86'	Report	Soisalo 32'; Gruber 54'	Stadium: Wittmann Antal park Attendance: 500; Referee: Ákos Gaál

1 November 2023 Round of 32	Ferencváros	4–3 (a.e.t.)	Puskás Akadémia	Budapest
20:00 CET (UTC+1)	Ćivić 35'; Aaneba 45+5'; Makreckis (yellow card) 104'; Traoré 114'; Abu Fani 120+11' (pen.)	Report	Gruber 9', 57'; Soisalo (yellow card) 97'; Golla (yellow card) 98'; Slagveer (yellow card) 100'; Plšek (yellow card) 104'; Favorov 120', (red card) 120+3'	Stadium: Groupama Arena; Attendance: 7,057; Referee: Balázs Berke

== Statistics ==
=== Overall ===
Appearances (Apps) numbers are for appearances in competitive games only, including sub appearances.
Source: Competitions

No.	Player	Pos.	Nemzeti Bajnokság I				Magyar Kupa				Total			
No.	Player	Pos.	Apps	Goal	Booked	Sent off (straight red)	Apps	Goal	Booked	Sent off (straight red)	Apps	Goal	Booked	Sent off (straight red)
1	(Hungary) Balázs Tóth	GK												
5	(Hungary) Bence Batik	DF	20	1	6		1				21	1	6	
7	(Hungary) György Komáromi	FW	29	7	3		2				31	7	3	
9	(The Gambia) Lamin Colley	FW	29	6	9		2				31	6	9	
10	(Sweden) Jonathan Levi	FW	24	2	1		2				26	2	1	
11	(Netherlands) Luciano Slagveer	FW	20	1	2		1		1		21	1	3	
14	(Poland) Wojciech Golla	DF	28	3	7		2		1		30	3	8	
15	(Czech Republic) Jakub Plšek	MF	33	6	4		2		1		35	6	5	
16	(Finland) Urho Nissilä	MF	13	3							13	3		
17	(Czech Republic) Patrizio Stronati	DF	33	1	2		2				35	1	2	
18	(Romania) Marius Corbu	MF	30	2	5		2				32	2	5	
19	(Ukraine) Artem Favorov	MF	26	4	2		2	1		1	28	5	2	1
20	(Finland) Mikael Soisalo	FW	18	2	2		2	1	1		20	3	3	
21	(Croatia) Jakov Puljić	FW	15	4	1		1				16	4	1	
22	(Hungary) Roland Szolnoki	DF	26	2	11		2				28	2	11	
23	(Switzerland) Quentin Maceiras	DF	26		7		1				27		7	
24	(Hungary) Tamás Markek	GK	17		1		2				19		1	
25	(Hungary) Zsolt Nagy	DF	26	11	7		1				27	11	7	
26	(Hungary) Ádám Umathum	DF												
27	(Hungary) Gergő Ominger	MF	4				1				5			
28	(Hungary) Viktor Lukács	MF												
29	(Ukraine) Artem Tyshchuk	MF												
30	(Hungary) Zsombor Gruber	FW	17	3	3		2	3			19	6	3	
31	(Hungary) Zsombor Bévárdi	DF	6								6			
33	(England) Brandon Ormonde-Ottewill	DF	30	1	7		2				32	1	7	
42	(Hungary) Kevin Mondovics	FW	2								2			
60	(Ukraine) Oleh Yablonskyi	FW												
66	(Hungary) Ákos Markgráf	DF	6								6			
71	(Hungary) Patrik Posztobányi	MF					1				1			
72	(Hungary) Bendegúz Lehoczki	GK												
73	(Hungary) Szabolcs Dusinszki	MF	1								1			
74	(Hungary) Martin Auerbach	GK												
76	(Hungary) Barna Pál	DF	1								1			
80	(Hungary) Viktor Vitályos	DF												
88	(Hungary) Bence Vékony	MF	4								4			
91	(Hungary) Ármin Pécsi	GK	16								16			
Own goals				1								1		
Totals				60	80			5	4	1		65	84	1

=== Clean sheets ===
			Clean sheets		
No.	Player	Games Played	Nemzeti Bajnokság I	Magyar Kupa	Total
24	(Hungary) Tamás Markek	19	6	1	7
91	(Hungary) Ármin Pécsi	16	4		4
1	(Hungary) Balázs Tóth	0			0
72	(Hungary) Bendegúz Lehoczki	0			0
74	(Hungary) Martin Auerbach	0			0
Totals			10	1	11
