= 2022–23 Puskás Akadémia FC season =

Puskás Akadémia
2022–23 season
- Chairman: Felcsúti Utánpótlás Neveléséért Alapítvány
- Manager: Zsolt Hornyák
- Stadium: Pancho Aréna
- Nemzeti Bajnokság I: 4th
- Magyar Kupa: Semi-finals
- UEFA Europa Conference League: Second qualifying round
- Top goalscorer: League: Shahab Zahedi (8); All: Shahab Zahedi (10)
- Highest home attendance: 3,121 vs Ferencváros (22 October 2022); Nemzeti Bajnokság I
- Lowest home attendance: 500 vs Vasas (3 February 2023); Nemzeti Bajnokság I
- Average home league attendance: 1,482
- Biggest win: 5–1 vs Újpest (H) (19 March 2023); Nemzeti Bajnokság I
- Biggest defeat: 0–3 vs Vitória de Guimarães (A) (21 July 2022); UEFA Europa Conference League; 1–4 vs Paks (H) (25 February 2023); Nemzeti Bajnokság I
| Home colours | Away colours | Third colours |
- All statistics correct as of 20 March 2023.

The 2022–23 season is Puskás Akadémia Football Club's 9th competitive season, 6th consecutive season in the Nemzeti Bajnokság I and 11th year in existence as a football club. In addition to the domestic league, Puskás Akadémia participated in this season's editions of the Magyar Kupa and UEFA Europa League.

== Transfers ==
=== Summer ===
In: Note: Flags indicate national team as defined under FIFA eligibility rules; some limited exceptions apply. Players may hold more than one non-FIFA nationality.

| No. | Pos. | Nation | Player |
|---|---|---|---|
| — | FW | GAM | Lamin Colley (from (Slovenia) Koper) |
| — | DF | POL | Wojciech Golla (from (Poland) Śląsk Wrocław) |
| — | DF | HUN | Bence Batik (from Budapest Honvéd) |
| — | MF | HUN | Marcell Major (from youth sector) |
| — | GK | HUN | Ármin Pécsi (from youth sector) |
| — | MF | HUN | Tamás Kiss (loan return from (Netherlands) Cambuur) |
| — | MF | HUN | Gergely Mim (loan return from Csákvár) |
| — | DF | HUN | András Huszti (loan return from Zalaegerszeg) |
| — | MF | HUN | Patrik Posztobányi (loan return from Zalaegerszeg) |
| — | DF | HUN | Gergő Major (loan return from Csákvár) |
| — | FW | HUN | Zsombor Gruber (loan return from (Switzerland) Basel) |

Out: Note: Flags indicate national team as defined under FIFA eligibility rules; some limited exceptions apply. Players may hold more than one non-FIFA nationality.

| No. | Pos. | Nation | Player |
|---|---|---|---|
| — | FW | CZE | Libor Kozák (to (Czech Republic) Slovácko) |
| — | DF | POR | João Nunes (to (Portugal) Casa Pia) |
| — | DF | HUN | István Csirmaz (to Diósgyőr) |
| — | FW | BRA | Weslen Júnior (to (Finland) Seinäjoki) |
| — | GK | HUN | Ágoston Kiss (to (Slovenia) Nafta Lendava) |
| — | DF | HUN | András Huszti (to Zalaegerszeg) |
| — | DF | HUN | Gergő Major (to Siófok) |
| — | MF | HUN | Márton Radics (loan to Diósgyőr) |
| — | MF | HUN | Gergely Mim (loan to Zalaegerszeg) |
| — | MF | HUN | Norbert Kiss (loan to Tiszakécske) |
| — | DF | HUN | Bendegúz Farkas (loan to Nyíregyháza) |
| — | MF | UKR | Kyrylo Yanitskyi (loan to Csákvár) |
| — | MF | HUN | Dániel Gera (loan return to Ferencváros) |

=== Winter ===
In: Note: Flags indicate national team as defined under FIFA eligibility rules; some limited exceptions apply. Players may hold more than one non-FIFA nationality.

| No. | Pos. | Nation | Player |
|---|---|---|---|
| — | MF | SWE | Jonathan Levi (from (Sweden) Norrköping) |
| — | DF | CRO | Karlo Bartolec (from (Croatia) Osijek) |
| — | DF | HUN | Levente Babós (from Puskás Akadémia II) |
| — | DF | CAN | Nathaniel Noel (from Puskás Akadémia II) |
| — | MF | HUN | Szabolcs Dusinszki (from Puskás Akadémia II) |
| — | MF | HUN | Martin Kern (from Puskás Akadémia II) |
| — | MF | HUN | Bálint Kártik (loan return from Csákvár) |

Out: Note: Flags indicate national team as defined under FIFA eligibility rules; some limited exceptions apply. Players may hold more than one non-FIFA nationality.

| No. | Pos. | Nation | Player |
|---|---|---|---|
| 8 | MF | SVK | Jozef Urblík |
| 13 | FW | UKR | Yevgeny Kichun (loan to Gyirmót) |
| 67 | MF | HUN | Balázs Bakti (loan to Budafok) |
| 77 | MF | HUN | Alen Skribek (to Paks) |
| 95 | MF | HUN | Marcell Major (loan to Nyíregyháza) |
| — | MF | HUN | Bálint Kártik (to Pécs) |

== Competitions ==
=== Overview ===
| Competition | First match | Last match | Starting round | Final position | Record | | | | | | | |
| Competition | First match | Last match | Starting round | Final position | Pld | W | D | L | GF | GA | GD | Win % |
|---|---|---|---|---|---|---|---|---|---|---|---|---|
| Nemzeti Bajnokság I | 31 July 2022 | 27 May 2023 | Matchday 1 | 4th | 33 | 14 | 11 | 8 | 48 | 42 | +6 | 42.42 |
| Magyar Kupa | 17 September 2022 | 4 April 2023 | Round of 64 | Semi-finals | 5 | 3 | 1 | 1 | 9 | 4 | +5 | 60.00 |
| UEFA Europa Conference League | 21 July 2022 | 28 July 2022 | Second qualifying round | Second qualifying round | 2 | 0 | 1 | 1 | 0 | 3 | −3 | 0.00 |
| Total | | | | | 40 | 17 | 13 | 10 | 57 | 49 | +8 | 42.50 |

Source: Competitions

=== Nemzeti Bajnokság I ===
==== League table ====
| Pos | Team | Pld | W | D | L | GF | GA | GD | Pts | Qualification or relegation |
|---|---|---|---|---|---|---|---|---|---|---|
| 2 | Kecskemét | 33 | 15 | 12 | 6 | 48 | 32 | +16 | 57 | Qualification for the Europa Conference League second qualifying round |
| 3 | Debrecen | 33 | 15 | 9 | 9 | 52 | 39 | +13 | 54 | Qualification for the Europa Conference League second qualifying round |
| 4 | Puskás Akadémia | 33 | 14 | 11 | 8 | 48 | 42 | +6 | 53 | |
| 5 | Paks | 33 | 14 | 7 | 12 | 57 | 57 | 0 | 49 | |
| 6 | Kisvárda | 33 | 10 | 13 | 10 | 43 | 49 | −6 | 43 | |

Source: Hungarian Football Federation (in Hungarian), Soccerway
Rules for classification: 1) Points; 2) Matches won; 3) Goal difference; 4) Goals scored; 5) Head-to-head points; 6) Head-to-head goal difference; 7) Fair play ranking; 8) Drawing of lots.

==== Results summary ====
| Overall | | | | | | | | Home | | | | | | Away | | | | | |
| Pld | W | D | L | GF | GA | GD | Pts | W | D | L | GF | GA | GD | W | D | L | GF | GA | GD |
|---|---|---|---|---|---|---|---|---|---|---|---|---|---|---|---|---|---|---|---|
| 33 | 14 | 11 | 8 | 48 | 42 | +6 | 53 | 9 | 3 | 4 | 24 | 20 | +4 | 5 | 8 | 4 | 24 | 22 | +2 |

Source: Soccerway

==== Results by round ====
| Round | 1 | 2 | 3 | 4 | 5 | 6 | 7 | 8 | 9 | 10 | 11 | 12 | 13 | 14 | 15 | 16 | 17 | 18 | 19 | 20 | 21 | 22 | 23 | 24 | 25 | 26 | 27 | 28 | 29 | 30 | 31 | 32 | 33 |
|---|---|---|---|---|---|---|---|---|---|---|---|---|---|---|---|---|---|---|---|---|---|---|---|---|---|---|---|---|---|---|---|---|---|
| Ground | A | H | A | H | A | H | A | A | H | A | H | H | A | H | A | H | A | H | H | A | H | A | A | H | A | H | A | H | A | A | H | A | H |
| Result | L | W | D | D | D | W | D | W | D | W | W | L | D | L | D | W | L | D | W | D | L | L | W | W | D | L | W | W | D | L | W | W | W |
| Position | 11 | 5 | 5 | 4 | 5 | 4 | 5 | 4 | 5 | 4 | 3 | 4 | 4 | 4 | 4 | 4 | 4 | 4 | 3 | 5 | 5 | 5 | 4 | 3 | 5 | 5 | 5 | 5 | 5 | 5 | 5 | 4 | 4 |

Source: Matches
A = Away; H = Home; W = Win; D = Draw; L = Loss

==== Matches ====
| 31 July 2022 1 | Ferencváros | 1–0 | Puskás Akadémia | Budapest |
| 20:30 CEST (UTC+2) | Zachariassen 90+4' | Report | | Stadium: Ferencváros Stadion; Attendance: 7,325; Referee: Ferenc Karakó |

| 7 August 2022 2 | Puskás Akadémia | 2–0 | Újpest | Felcsút |
| 17:45 CEST (UTC+2) | Corbu 38', 62'; Skribek (red card) 64' | Report | | Stadium: Pancho Aréna; Attendance: 2,000; Referee: Tamás Bognár |

| 14 August 2022 3 | Kisvárda | 1–1 | Puskás Akadémia | Kisvárda |
| 18:00 CEST (UTC+2) | Mešanović 87' | Report | van Nieff 13' | Stadium: Várkerti Stadion; Attendance: 2,217; Referee: Csaba Pintér |

| 19 August 2022 4 | Puskás Akadémia | 1–1 | Kecskemét | Felcsút |
| 20:00 CEST (UTC+2) | A. Szabó 86' (o.g.) | Report | Szuhodovszki 3'; Zeke (red card) 79' | Stadium: Pancho Aréna; Attendance: 980; Referee: Sándor Andó-Szabó |

| 27 August 2022 5 | Debrecen | 1–1 | Puskás Akadémia | Debrecen |
| 19:45 CEST (UTC+2) | Dzsudzsák 21' (pen.) | Report | Zahedi 89' | Stadium: Nagyerdei Stadion; Attendance: 3,803; Referee: Balázs Berke |

| 30 August 2022 6 | Puskás Akadémia | 1–0 | Mezőkövesd | Felcsút |
| 17:45 CEST (UTC+2) | Favorov 77' | Report | | Stadium: Pancho Aréna; Attendance: 1,028; Referee: Marcell Derdák |

| 3 September 2022 7 | Vasas | 1–1 | Puskás Akadémia | Budapest |
| 16:15 CEST (UTC+2) | Holender 28' | Report | Zahedi 56' | Stadium: Illovszky Rudolf Stadion; Attendance: 1,778; Referee: Gergő Bogár |

| 11 September 2022 8 | Zalaegerszeg | 1–2 | Puskás Akadémia | Zalaegerszeg |
| 15:00 CEST (UTC+2) | Ikoba 23' | Report | Băluță 74'; Slagveer 88' | Stadium: ZTE Arena; Attendance: 2,351; Referee: Csaba Pintér |

| 2 October 2022 9 | Puskás Akadémia | 1–1 | Fehérvár | Felcsút |
| 18:45 CEST (UTC+2) | Zahedi 57' | Report | Kodro 78' | Stadium: Pancho Aréna; Attendance: 1,680; Referee: Tamás Bognár |

| 9 October 2022 10 | Paks | 1–3 | Puskás Akadémia | Paks |
| 15:30 CEST (UTC+2) | Varga 36' | Report | Corbu 7'; Favorov 67'; Băluță 77' | Stadium: Fehérvári úti Stadion; Attendance: 1,976; Referee: József Erdős |

| 15 October 2022 11 | Puskás Akadémia | 1–0 | Budapest Honvéd | Felcsút |
| 17:00 CEST (UTC+2) | Batik 38' | Report | Bocskay (red card) 74' | Stadium: Pancho Aréna; Attendance: 1,828; Referee: Márton Rúsz |

| 22 October 2022 12 | Puskás Akadémia | 2–4 | Ferencváros | Felcsút |
| 18:30 CEST (UTC+2) | Puljić 3' (pen.); Nagy 33' | Report | Marquinhos 8'; R. Mmaee 29'; Traoré 45', 53' | Stadium: Pancho Aréna; Attendance: 3,121; Referee: József Erdős |

| 30 October 2022 13 | Újpest | 3–3 | Puskás Akadémia | Budapest |
| 15:00 CET (UTC+1) | Diaby 24'; Antonov 66' (pen.); Csongvai 82'; Csoboth (red card) 33' | Report | Puljić 11'; Zahedi 77', 86'; Băluță (red card) 45'; Spandler (red card) 82' | Stadium: Szusza Ferenc Stadion; Attendance: 2,323; Referee: Gergő Bogár |

| 5 November 2022 14 | Puskás Akadémia | 0–1 | Kisvárda | Felcsút |
| 17:00 CET (UTC+1) | | Report | Ilievski 90+2' | Stadium: Pancho Aréna; Attendance: 1,120; Referee: Péter Antal |

| 8 November 2022 15 | Kecskemét | 1–1 | Puskás Akadémia | Kecskemét |
| 20:00 CET (UTC+1) | Banó-Szabó 52' | Report | Corbu 45' | Stadium: Széktói Stadion; Attendance: 1,720; Referee: Péter Zierkelbach |

| 12 November 2022 16 | Puskás Akadémia | 2–1 | Debrecen | Felcsút |
| 14:15 CET (UTC+1) | Batik 18', 89' | Report | Dzsudzsák 41' | Stadium: Pancho Aréna; Attendance: 1,670; Referee: Bence Csonka |

| 29 January 2023 17 | Mezőkövesd | 1–0 | Puskás Akadémia | Mezőkövesd |
| 13:00 CET (UTC+1) | Dražić 80' | Report | Băluță (yellow card) 90' (yellow-red card) 93' | Stadium: Városi Stadion; Attendance: 1,219; Referee: Sándor Andó-Szabó |

| 3 February 2023 18 | Puskás Akadémia | 1–1 | Vasas | Felcsút |
| 20:00 CET (UTC+1) | Slagveer 13' | Report | Berecz 57' | Stadium: Pancho Aréna; Attendance: 500; Referee: István Vad |

| 12 February 2023 19 | Puskás Akadémia | 1–0 | Zalaegerszeg | Felcsút |
| 15:00 CET (UTC+1) | Gruber 82' | Report | | Stadium: Pancho Aréna; Attendance: 900; Referee: Ádám Pillók |

| 18 February 2023 20 | Fehérvár | 1–1 | Puskás Akadémia | Székesfehérvár |
| 19:30 CET (UTC+1) | Csongvai 54'; Kastrati (red card) 90+4' | Report | Levi 82' | Stadium: MOL Aréna Sóstó; Attendance: 2,471; Referee: István Vad |

| 25 February 2023 21 | Puskás Akadémia | 1–4 | Paks | Felcsút |
| 17:00 CET (UTC+1) | Spandler 8' | Report | Varga 35', 37'; Böde 84', 87' | Stadium: Pancho Aréna; Attendance: 1,120; Referee: Péter Zierkelbach |

| 5 March 2023 22 | Budapest Honvéd | 3–1 | Puskás Akadémia | Budapest |
| 15:00 CET (UTC+1) | Prenga 57', 67'; Lukić 81'; Doka (red card) 85' | Report | Favorov 47' | Stadium: Bozsik Aréna; Attendance: 3,656; Referee: Gergő Bogár |

| 12 March 2023 23 | Ferencváros | 1–2 | Puskás Akadémia | Budapest |
| 18:15 CET (UTC+1) | Botka 90+6' | Report | Komáromi 28'; Puljić 37' (red card) 56' | Stadium: Groupama Arena; Attendance: 7,051; Referee: Csaba Pintér |

| 19 March 2023 24 | Puskás Akadémia | 5–1 | Újpest | Felcsút |
| 15:30 CET (UTC+1) | Corbu 10'; Colley 62', 68'; Slagveer 74'; Zahedi 89' | Report | Varga 83' | Stadium: Pancho Aréna; Attendance: 1,840; Referee: István Vad |

| 1 April 2023 25 | Kisvárda | 2–2 | Puskás Akadémia | Kisvárda |
| 13:00 CEST (UTC+2) | Navrátil (yellow card) 26'; Spasić 31', 61'; Camaj (yellow card) 75'; Alić (red card) 83' | Report | Colley (yellow card) 41'; Zahedi (yellow card) 64', (goal) 78'; Favorov 85' (pen.) | Stadium: Várkerti Stadion; Attendance: 1,768; Referee: József Erdős |

| 8 April 2023 26 | Puskás Akadémia | 0–3 | Kecskemét | Felcsút |
| 14:30 CEST (UTC+2) | Posztobányi (yellow card) 82'; van Nieff (yellow card) 83' | Report | Horváth 6', 55'; Szalai (yellow card) 36', (goal) 50' | Stadium: Pancho Aréna; Attendance: 1,810; Referee: Marcell Derdák |

| 14 April 2023 27 | Debrecen | 0–1 | Puskás Akadémia | Debrecen |
| 20:00 CEST (UTC+2) | Manrique (yellow card) 23'; Hamzat (yellow card) 27'; Dzsudzsák (yellow card) 55'; Drešković (yellow card) 71'; Varga (yellow card) 79'; Ferenczi (red card) 89' | Report | Favorov (yellow card) 11'; Komáromi (yellow card) 25'; Golla (yellow card) 48'; Colley (yellow card) 89'; Zahedi 90+3' | Stadium: Nagyerdei Stadion; Attendance: 3,726; Referee: Tamás Bognár |

| 23 April 2023 28 | Puskás Akadémia | 2–1 | Mezőkövesd | Felcsút |
| 16:30 CEST (UTC+2) | Gruber 20'; Szolnoki (yellow card) 37'; Puljić 46'; Golla (yellow card) 56'; Zahedi (yellow card) 89' | Report | Dražić (yellow card) 48'; Babunski 59' | Stadium: Pancho Aréna; Attendance: 1,381; Referee: Ferenc Karakó |

| 29 April 2023 29 | Vasas | 2–2 | Puskás Akadémia | Budapest |
| 19:30 CEST (UTC+2) | Szivacski (yellow card) 31'; Urblík (yellow card) 42', (goal) 73', 88' | Report | Favorov 50', (yellow card) 87'; Golla (yellow card) 86'; Komáromi 90'; Batik (yellow card) 90+2' | Stadium: Illovszky Rudolf Stadion; Attendance: 1,458; Referee: Péter Antal |

| 7 May 2023 30 | Zalaegerszeg | 2–1 | Puskás Akadémia | Zalaegerszeg |
| 15:00 CEST (UTC+2) | Ikoba 13'; Safronov (yellow card) 28'; Klausz 45+1'; Mocsi (yellow card) 48'; Szendrei (yellow card) 86' | Report | Colley 26', (red card) 90+1'; Ormonde-Ottewill (yellow card) 37'; Szolnoki (yellow card) 72'; Spandler (yellow card) 90+7' | Stadium: ZTE Arena; Attendance: 2,248; Referee: József Erdős |

| 14 May 2023 31 | Puskás Akadémia | 2–1 | Fehérvár | Felcsút |
| 18:00 CEST (UTC+2) | Gruber 52'; Komáromi (yellow card) 55', (goal) 84'; Zahedi (red card) 79'; Favorov (yellow card) 90+6' | Report | Flores (yellow card) 40'; Pokorný (yellow card) 57'; Dárdai 72'; Larsen (red card) 90+3' | Stadium: Pancho Aréna; Attendance: 2,420; Referee: István Vad |

| 19 May 2023 32 | Paks | 0–2 | Puskás Akadémia | Paks |
| 18:15 CEST (UTC+2) | Papp (yellow card) 15'; Kovács (yellow card) 26' | Report | Batik (yellow card) 12'; Golla (yellow card) 74'; Plšek 76'; Ormonde-Ottewill (yellow card) 86'; Corbu 90+4' | Stadium: Fehérvári úti Stadion; Attendance: 2,612; Referee: Gergő Bogár |

| 27 May 2023 33 | Puskás Akadémia | 2–1 | Budapest Honvéd | Felcsút |
| 20:00 CEST (UTC+2) | Colley (yellow card) 6'; Plšek (yellow card) 34'; Stronati (yellow card) 51'; Slagveer 87'; Favorov 90+4'; Szolnoki (yellow card) 90+5' | Report | Szabó (yellow card) 64'; Zsótér (yellow card) 87', (goal) 89'; Klemenz (yellow card) 88'; Klafurić (not on pitch) (yellow card) 89'; Domingues (red card) 90+2' | Stadium: Pancho Aréna; Attendance: 2,512; Referee: István Vad |

=== Magyar Kupa ===
| 17 September 2022 Round of 64 | Csákvár | 2–5 | Puskás Akadémia | Csákvár |
| 16:00 CEST (UTC+2) | Torvund 39'; Alaxai 73' | Report | Zahedi 24' (pen.), 33'; Slagveer 26'; Colley 79', 89' | Stadium: Tersztyánszky Ödön Sportközpont; Attendance: 300; Referee: Norbert Nagy |

| 19 October 2022 Round of 32 | Fehérvár | 0–1 | Puskás Akadémia | Székesfehérvár |
| 20:00 CEST (UTC+2) | | Report | Puljić 24' | Stadium: MOL Aréna Sóstó; Attendance: 1,425; Referee: Sándor Andó-Szabó |

| 9 February 2023 Round of 16 | Puskás Akadémia | 0–0 (a.e.t.) (5–4 p) | Újpest | Felcsút |
| 19:00 CET (UTC+1) | | Report | | Stadium: Pancho Aréna; Attendance: 1,720; Referee: Gergő Bogár |
| | Penalties |
| | Puljić (penalty scored); van Nieff (penalty scored); Corbu (penalty missed); Gruber (penalty scored); Favorov (penalty scored); Batik (penalty scored) | | (penalty scored) Boumal; (penalty missed) Simon; (penalty scored) Antonov; (penalty scored) Csongvai; (penalty missed) Gouré |
Note: Puskás Akadémia won on penalty kicks 5–4

| 2 March 2023 Quarter-finals | Debrecen | 1–3 | Puskás Akadémia | Debrecen |
| 20:00 CET (UTC+1) | Ferenczi 31' | Report | Gruber 1'; Levi 12'; Slagveer 85' | Stadium: Nagyerdei Stadion; Attendance: 3,811; Referee: Bence Csonka |

| 4 April 2023 Semi-finals | Zalaegerszeg | 1–0 (a.e.t.) | Puskás Akadémia | Zalaegerszeg |
| 20:00 CEST (UTC+2) | Csóka (yellow card) 42'; Szendrei (yellow card) 105'; Bartolec 119' (o.g.) | Report | Ormonde-Ottewill (yellow card) 85'; Komáromi (yellow card) 89' | Stadium: ZTE Arena; Attendance: 2,081; Referee: István Vad |

=== UEFA Europa Conference League ===
==== Second qualifying round ====
| 21 July 2022 First leg | Vitória de Guimarães (Portugal) | 3–0 | (Hungary) Puskás Akadémia | Guimarães, Portugal |
| 20:30 WEST (UTC+1) | Lameiras 4'; T. Silva 39'; A. Silva 65', (yellow card) 90+9'; D. Silva (yellow card) 90+2' | Report | van Nieff (yellow card) 48'; Stronati (yellow card) 68' | Stadium: Estádio D. Afonso Henriques; Attendance: 14,863; Referee: Henrik Nalbandyan (Armenia) |

| 28 July 2022 Second leg | Puskás Akadémia (Hungary) | 0–0 (0–3 agg.) | (Portugal) Vitória de Guimarães | Felcsút, Hungary |
| 21:00 CEST (UTC+2) | Komáromi (yellow card) 26'; Szolnoki (yellow card) 36'; van Nieff (yellow card) 72'; Urblík (yellow card) 78'; Băluță (yellow card) 90+2' | Report | Maga (yellow card) 28'; Amaro (yellow card) 70' | Stadium: Pancho Aréna; Attendance: 2,325; Referee: Jakob Alexander Sundberg (Denmark) |
Note: Vitória de Guimarães won 3–0 on aggregate.

== Statistics ==
=== Appearances and goals ===
Last updated on 20 March 2023.

| No. | Pos | Nat | Player | Total | | Nemzeti Bajnokság I | | UEFA Europa Conference League | | Magyar Kupa | |
| No. | Pos | Nat | Player | Apps | Goals | Apps | Goals | Apps | Goals | Apps | Goals |
|---|---|---|---|---|---|---|---|---|---|---|---|
| 1 | GK | (Hungary) HUN | Balázs Tóth | 19 | -23 | 19 | -23 | 0 | -0 | 0 | -0 |
| 2 | DF | (Belgium) BEL | Mohamed Mezghrani | 23 | 0 | 20 | 0 | 2 | 0 | 1 | 0 |
| 5 | DF | (Hungary) HUN | Bence Batik | 23 | 3 | 20 | 3 | 0 | 0 | 3 | 0 |
| 6 | MF | (Netherlands) NED | Yoell van Nieff | 27 | 1 | 21 | 1 | 2 | 0 | 4 | 0 |
| 7 | MF | (Hungary) HUN | Tamás Kiss | 19 | 0 | 15 | 0 | 2 | 0 | 2 | 0 |
| 8 | MF | (Sweden) SWE | Jonathan Levi | 10 | 2 | 8 | 1 | 0 | 0 | 2 | 1 |
| 9 | FW | (The Gambia) GAM | Lamin Colley | 18 | 4 | 14 | 2 | 1 | 0 | 3 | 2 |
| 10 | MF | (Romania) ROU | Alexandru Băluță | 23 | 2 | 19 | 2 | 2 | 0 | 2 | 0 |
| 11 | FW | (Netherlands) NED | Luciano Slagveer | 18 | 5 | 13 | 3 | 1 | 0 | 4 | 2 |
| 12 | FW | (Iran) IRI | Shahab Zahedi | 25 | 8 | 21 | 6 | 2 | 0 | 2 | 2 |
| 15 | MF | (Czech Republic) CZE | Jakub Plšek | 3 | 0 | 2 | 0 | 0 | 0 | 1 | 0 |
| 17 | DF | (Czech Republic) CZE | Patrizio Stronati | 26 | 0 | 21 | 0 | 2 | 0 | 3 | 0 |
| 18 | MF | (Romania) ROU | Marius Corbu | 28 | 5 | 23 | 5 | 1 | 0 | 4 | 0 |
| 19 | MF | (Ukraine) UKR | Artem Favorov | 26 | 3 | 21 | 3 | 1 | 0 | 4 | 0 |
| 20 | DF | (Croatia) CRO | Karlo Bartolec | 9 | 0 | 7 | 0 | 0 | 0 | 2 | 0 |
| 21 | FW | (Croatia) CRO | Jakov Puljić | 19 | 4 | 14 | 3 | 1 | 0 | 4 | 1 |
| 22 | DF | (Hungary) HUN | Roland Szolnoki | 3 | 0 | 1 | 0 | 2 | 0 | 0 | 0 |
| 23 | DF | (Hungary) HUN | Csaba Spandler | 22 | 1 | 16 | 1 | 2 | 0 | 4 | 0 |
| 24 | GK | (Hungary) HUN | Tamás Markek | 11 | -11 | 5 | -7 | 2 | -3 | 4 | -1 |
| 25 | DF | (Hungary) HUN | Zsolt Nagy | 13 | 1 | 9 | 1 | 2 | 0 | 2 | 0 |
| 30 | FW | (Hungary) HUN | Zsombor Gruber | 20 | 2 | 17 | 1 | 0 | 0 | 3 | 1 |
| 33 | DF | (England) ENG | Brandon Ormonde-Ottewill | 14 | 0 | 12 | 0 | 0 | 0 | 2 | 0 |
| 97 | FW | (Hungary) HUN | György Komáromi | 18 | 1 | 16 | 1 | 1 | 0 | 1 | 0 |
Youth players:
| 13 | DF | (Canada) CAN | Nathaniel Noel | 0 | 0 | 0 | 0 | 0 | 0 | 0 | 0 |
| 14 | DF | (Poland) POL | Wojciech Golla | 4 | 0 | 3 | 0 | 0 | 0 | 1 | 0 |
| 27 | DF | (Hungary) HUN | Levente Babós | 0 | 0 | 0 | 0 | 0 | 0 | 0 | 0 |
| 71 | MF | (Hungary) HUN | Patrik Posztobányi | 1 | 0 | 1 | 0 | 0 | 0 | 0 | 0 |
| 73 | MF | (Hungary) HUN | Szabolcs Dusinszki | 2 | 0 | 2 | 0 | 0 | 0 | 0 | 0 |
| 74 | MF | (Hungary) HUN | Martin Kern | 2 | 0 | 2 | 0 | 0 | 0 | 0 | 0 |
| 91 | GK | (Hungary) HUN | Ármin Pécsi | 0 | 0 | 0 | -0 | 0 | -0 | 0 | -0 |
Out to loan:
| 13 | FW | (Ukraine) UKR | Yevgeny Kichun | 1 | 0 | 0 | 0 | 1 | 0 | 0 | 0 |
| 32 | MF | (Hungary) HUN | Márton Radics | 0 | 0 | 0 | 0 | 0 | 0 | 0 | 0 |
| 67 | MF | (Hungary) HUN | Balázs Bakti | 5 | 0 | 4 | 0 | 1 | 0 | 0 | 0 |
| 77 | MF | (Hungary) HUN | Alen Skribek | 11 | 0 | 8 | 0 | 1 | 0 | 2 | 0 |
| 95 | MF | (Hungary) HUN | Marcell Major | 2 | 0 | 2 | 0 | 0 | 0 | 0 | 0 |
Players no longer at the club:
| 8 | MF | (Slovakia) SVK | Jozef Urblík | 12 | 0 | 8 | 0 | 2 | 0 | 2 | 0 |

=== Top scorers ===
Includes all competitive matches. The list is sorted by shirt number when total goals are equal.

| Position | Nation | Number | Name | Nemzeti Bajnokság I | UEFA Europa Conference League | Magyar Kupa | Total |
|---|---|---|---|---|---|---|---|
| 1 | (Iran) | 12 | Shahab Zahedi | 8 | 0 | 2 | 10 |
| 2 | (Netherlands) | 11 | Luciano Slagveer | 4 | 0 | 2 | 6 |
| 2 | (Romania) | 18 | Marius Corbu | 6 | 0 | 0 | 6 |
| 2 | (Ukraine) | 19 | Artem Favorov | 6 | 0 | 0 | 6 |
| 5 | (The Gambia) | 9 | Lamin Colley | 3 | 0 | 2 | 5 |
| 5 | (Croatia) | 21 | Jakov Puljić | 4 | 0 | 1 | 5 |
| 7 | (Hungary) | 30 | Zsombor Gruber | 3 | 0 | 1 | 4 |
| 8 | (Hungary) | 5 | Bence Batik | 3 | 0 | 0 | 3 |
| 8 | (Hungary) | 97 | György Komáromi | 3 | 0 | 0 | 3 |
| 10 | (Sweden) | 8 | Jonathan Levi | 1 | 0 | 1 | 2 |
| 10 | (Romania) | 10 | Alexandru Băluță | 2 | 0 | 0 | 2 |
| 12 | (Netherlands) | 6 | Yoell van Nieff | 1 | 0 | 0 | 1 |
| 12 | (Czech Republic) | 15 | Jakub Plšek | 1 | 0 | 0 | 1 |
| 12 | (Hungary) | 23 | Csaba Spandler | 1 | 0 | 0 | 1 |
| 12 | (Hungary) | 25 | Zsolt Nagy | 1 | 0 | 0 | 1 |
| / | / | / | Own Goals | 1 | 0 | 0 | 1 |
| | | | TOTALS | 48 | 0 | 9 | 57 |

=== Disciplinary record ===
Includes all competitive matches. Players with 1 card or more included only.

Last updated on 20 March 2023

| Position | Nation | Number | Name | Nemzeti Bajnokság I | | UEFA Europa Conference League | | Magyar Kupa | | Total (Hu Total) | |
| Position | Nation | Number | Name | Yellow card | Red card | Yellow card | Red card | Yellow card | Red card | Yellow card | Red card |
| MF | (Belgium) | 2 | Mohamed Mezghrani | 3 | 0 | 0 | 0 | 0 | 0 | 3 (3) | 0 (0) |
| DF | (Hungary) | 5 | Bence Batik | 3 | 0 | 0 | 0 | 1 | 0 | 4 (3) | 0 (0) |
| MF | (Netherlands) | 6 | Yoell van Nieff | 8 | 0 | 2 | 0 | 2 | 0 | 12 (8) | 0 (0) |
| MF | (Hungary) | 7 | Tamás Kiss | 4 | 0 | 0 | 0 | 0 | 0 | 4 (4) | 0 (0) |
| MF | (Slovakia) | 8 | Jozef Urblík | 2 | 0 | 1 | 0 | 0 | 0 | 3 (2) | 0 (0) |
| FW | (The Gambia) | 9 | Lamin Colley | 4 | 0 | 0 | 0 | 0 | 0 | 4 (4) | 0 (0) |
| MF | (Romania) | 10 | Alexandru Băluță | 5 | 2 | 1 | 0 | 0 | 0 | 6 (5) | 2 (2) |
| FW | (Iran) | 12 | Shahab Zahedi | 2 | 0 | 0 | 0 | 0 | 0 | 2 (2) | 0 (0) |
| DF | (Czech Republic) | 17 | Patrizio Stronati | 5 | 0 | 1 | 0 | 0 | 0 | 6 (5) | 0 (0) |
| FW | (Romania) | 18 | Marius Corbu | 5 | 0 | 0 | 0 | 0 | 0 | 5 (5) | 0 (0) |
| MF | (Ukraine) | 19 | Artem Favorov | 4 | 0 | 0 | 0 | 1 | 0 | 5 (4) | 0 (0) |
| DF | (Croatia) | 20 | Karlo Bartolec | 2 | 0 | 0 | 0 | 1 | 0 | 3 (2) | 0 (0) |
| DF | (Croatia) | 21 | Jakov Puljić | 1 | 1 | 0 | 0 | 1 | 0 | 2 (1) | 1 (1) |
| DF | (Hungary) | 22 | Roland Szolnoki | 0 | 0 | 1 | 0 | 0 | 0 | 1 (0) | 0 (0) |
| DF | (Hungary) | 23 | Csaba Spandler | 7 | 1 | 0 | 0 | 0 | 0 | 7 (7) | 1 (1) |
| FW | (Ukraine) | 30 | Zsombor Gruber | 1 | 0 | 0 | 0 | 1 | 0 | 2 (1) | 0 (0) |
| DF | (England) | 33 | Brandon Ormonde-Ottewill | 2 | 0 | 0 | 0 | 1 | 0 | 3 (2) | 0 (0) |
| MF | (Hungary) | 77 | Alen Skribek | 0 | 1 | 0 | 0 | 0 | 0 | 0 (0) | 1 (1) |
| MF | (Hungary) | 95 | Marcell Major | 1 | 0 | 0 | 0 | 0 | 0 | 1 (1) | 0 (0) |
| MF | (Hungary) | 97 | György Komáromi | 5 | 0 | 1 | 0 | 0 | 0 | 6 (5) | 0 (0) |
| | | | TOTALS | 64 | 5 | 7 | 0 | 6 | 0 | 77 (64) | 5 (5) |

=== Clean sheets ===
Last updated on 9 April 2023

| Position | Nation | Number | Name | Nemzeti Bajnokság I | UEFA Europa Conference League | Magyar Kupa | Total |
|---|---|---|---|---|---|---|---|
| 1 | (Hungary) | 24 | Tamás Markek | 1 | 1 | 2 | 4 |
| 2 | (Hungary) | 1 | Balázs Tóth | 3 | 0 | 0 | 3 |
| 3 | (Hungary) | 91 | Ármin Pécsi | 0 | 0 | 0 | 0 |
| | | | TOTALS | 4 | 1 | 2 | 7 |
