= 2021–22 Puskás Akadémia FC season =

Puskás Akadémia
2021–22 season
- Chairman: Felcsúti Utánpótlás Neveléséért Alapítvány
- Manager: Zsolt Hornyák
- Stadium: Pancho Aréna
- Nemzeti Bajnokság I: 3rd
- Magyar Kupa: Round of 32
- UEFA Europa Conference League: Second qualifying round
- Top goalscorer: League: Alexandru Băluță (7); All: Jakub Plšek (5)
Home colours	Away colours	Third colours

The 2021–22 season was Puskás Akadémia Football Club's 8th competitive season, 5th consecutive season in the Nemzeti Bajnokság I and 10th year in existence as a football club. In addition to the domestic league, Puskás Akadémia participated in this season's editions of the Magyar Kupa and UEFA Europa Conference League.

== Squad ==
As of match played 4 August 2021

No.	Name	Nationality	Position	Date of birth (age)	Signed from	Signed in	Apps.	Goals
Goalkeepers
1	Balázs Tóth	(Hungary)	GK	4 September 1997 (aged 23)	youth sector	2016	0	0
24	Tamás Markek	(Hungary)	GK	30 August 1991 (aged 29)	Csákvár	2021	0	0
31	Ágoston Kiss	(Hungary)	GK	14 March 2001 (aged 20)	Szombathelyi Haladás	2020	0	0
Defenders
3	João Nunes	(Portugal)	DF	19 November 1995 (aged 25)	Panathinaikos	2020	0	0
17	Patrizio Stronati	(Czech Republic)	DF	17 November 1994 (aged 26)	Baník Ostrava	2021	0	0
22	Roland Szolnoki	(Hungary)	DF	21 January 1992 (aged 29)	Fehérvár	2018	0	0
23	Csaba Spandler	(Hungary)	DF	7 March 1996 (aged 25)	youth sector	2014	0	0
25	Zsolt Nagy	(Hungary)	DF	25 May 1993 (aged 28)	Fehérvár	2014	0	0
33	Gergő Major	(Hungary)	DF	16 July 2000 (aged 21)	youth sector	2021	0	0
99	László Deutsch	(Hungary)	DF	9 March 1999 (aged 22)	youth sector	2020	0	0
Midfielders
6	Yoell van Nieff	(Netherlands)	MF	17 June 1993 (aged 28)	Heracles	2019	0	0
8	Jozef Urblík	(Slovakia)	MF	22 August 1996 (aged 24)	Vysočina Jihlava	2018	0	0
10	Alexandru Băluță	(Romania)	MF	13 September 1993 (aged 27)	Slavia Prague	2020	0	0
15	Jakub Plšek	(Czech Republic)	MF	13 December 1993 (aged 27)	Sigma Olomouc	2020	0	0
18	Marius Corbu	(Romania)	MF	7 May 2002 (aged 19)	youth sector	2020	0	0
19	Artem Favorov	(Ukraine)	MF	19 March 1994 (aged 27)	Desna Chernihiv	2020	0	0
71	Patrik Posztobányi	(Hungary)	MF	29 July 2002 (aged 19)	youth sector	2021	0	0
TBA	Bálint Kártik	(Hungary)	MF	18 April 1997 (aged 24)	Nyíregyháza	2021	0	0
Forwards
7	Tamás Kiss	(Hungary)	FW	24 November 2000 (aged 20)	Szombathelyi Haladás	2018	0	0
9	Libor Kozák	(Czech Republic)	FW	30 May 1989 (aged 32)	Sparta Prague	2021	0	0
11	Luciano Slagveer	(Netherlands)	FW	5 October 1993 (aged 27)	Emmen	2020	0	0
14	Dániel Gera	(Hungary)	FW	29 August 1995 (aged 25)	loan from Ferencváros	2021	0	0
21	Jakov Puljić	(Croatia)	FW	4 August 1993 (aged 28)	Jagiellonia Białystok	2021	0	0
49	Krisztián Géresi	(Hungary)	FW	14 June 1994 (aged 27)	loan from Fehérvár	2021	0	0
70	Zsombor Gruber	(Hungary)	FW	7 September 2004 (aged 16)	youth sector	2021	0	0
90	Weslen Júnior	(Brazil)	FW	12 November 1999 (aged 21)	São Bernardo	2020	0	0
97	György Komáromi	(Hungary)	FW	19 January 2002 (aged 19)	youth sector	2020	0	0
Players away on loan
Players who left during the season

== Transfers ==
=== Summer ===
In: Note: Flags indicate national team as defined under FIFA eligibility rules; some limited exceptions apply. Players may hold more than one non-FIFA nationality.

No.	Pos.	Nation	Player
7	DF	HUN	István Csirmaz (from Csákvár)
14	MF	HUN	Dániel Gera (loan from Ferencváros)
17	DF	CZE	Patrizio Stronati (from (Czech Republic) Baník Ostrava)
18	FW	CZE	Libor Kozák (from (Czech Republic) Sparta Prague)
19	MF	UKR	Artem Favorov (loan return from Zalaegerszeg)
20	MF	HUN	Márton Radics (loan return from Gyirmót)
21	FW	CRO	Jakov Puljić (from (Poland) Jagiellonia Białystok)
24	GK	HUN	Tamás Markek (from Csákvár)
26	MF	HUN	Gergely Mim (from Puskás Akadémia II)
33	DF	HUN	Gergő Major (from Puskás Akadémia II)
70	MF	HUN	Zsombor Gruber (from Puskás Akadémia II)
71	MF	HUN	Patrik Posztobányi (from Puskás Akadémia II)
87	MF	HUN	Gergő Ominger (from Puskás Akadémia II)
—	MF	HUN	Botond Nándori (loan return from Csákvár)
—	FW	HUN	Alen Skribek (loan return from Budafok)
—	MF	HUN	András Huszti (loan return from Budafok)
—	MF	HUN	Bálint Kártik (loan return from Csákvár)
—	MF	ROU	Lóránd Fülöp (loan return from (Romania) Sepsi)
—	MF	HUN	Márk Madarász (loan return from Csákvár)

Out: Note: Flags indicate national team as defined under FIFA eligibility rules; some limited exceptions apply. Players may hold more than one non-FIFA nationality.

No.	Pos.	Nation	Player
5	DF	GER	Thomas Meißner (to (Germany) Hansa Rostock)
7	FW	HUN	Tamás Kiss (loan to (Netherlands) Cambuur)
18	DF	HUN	András Huszti (loan to Zalaegerszeg)
26	DF	BUL	Kamen Hadzhiev (to (Bulgaria) Beroe)
26	MF	HUN	Gergely Mim (loan to Csákvár)
27	MF	ALB	Liridon Latifi (to (Albania) Vllaznia)
30	MF	CRO	Josip Knežević (to (Kuwait) Al-Arabi)
33	DF	HUN	Gergő Major (loan to Csákvár)
39	FW	MGL	Ganbold Ganbayar (loan to (Slovakia) Komárno)
74	GK	HUN	Martin Auerbach (loan to Csákvár)
77	FW	CRO	Antonio Mance (loan return to (Croatia) Osijek)
87	MF	HUN	Gergő Ominger (loan to Csákvár)
—	FW	HUN	Alen Skribek (loan to Zalaegerszeg)
—	MF	ROU	Lóránd Fülöp (to (Romania) Voluntari)
—	MF	HUN	Botond Nándori (loan to Budafok)
—	MF	HUN	Márk Madarász (to Mezőkövesd)
—	MF	HUN	Bálint Kártik (loan to Csákvár)

=== Winter ===
In: Note: Flags indicate national team as defined under FIFA eligibility rules; some limited exceptions apply. Players may hold more than one non-FIFA nationality.

No.	Pos.	Nation	Player
—	DF	BEL	Mohamed Mezghrani (from Budapest Honvéd)
—	FW	HUN	Alen Skribek (loan return from Zalaegerszeg)
—	FW	ROU	Nándor Tamás (loan return from (Romania) Sepsi)

Out: Note: Flags indicate national team as defined under FIFA eligibility rules; some limited exceptions apply. Players may hold more than one non-FIFA nationality.

No.	Pos.	Nation	Player
—	DF	HUN	Kristóf Papp (loan to Budaörs)
—	FW	ROU	Nándor Tamás (loan to Csákvár)
—	MF	HUN	Patrik Posztobányi (loan to Zalaegerszeg)
—	FW	HUN	Krisztián Gérei (loan return to Fehérvár)
—	FW	HUN	Zsombor Gruber (to (Switzerland) Basel)

== Pre–season and friendlies ==
Win Draw Loss Fixtures

19 June 2021 Friendly	Juniors OÖ (Austria)	0–5	Puskás Akadémia	Pasching, Austria
17:00 CEST		Report	Nunes 17'; Komáromi 24'; Slagveer 30'; Plšek 37'; Skribek 89'	Stadium: Raiffeisen Arena

22 June 2021 Friendly	Puskás Akadémia	1–0	(Romania) CFR Cluj	Ottensheim, Austria
17:00 CEST	Plšek 63' (pen.)	Report

25 June 2021 Friendly	Puskás Akadémia	1–0	(Slovenia) Aluminij	Ottensheim, Austria
17:00 CEST	Júnior 58'	Report

1 July 2021 Friendly	Puskás Akadémia	2–0	(Slovakia) Spartak Trnava	Felcsút, Hungary
17:00 CEST	Nagy 15'; Plšek 35'	Report		Stadium: Pancho Aréna

== Competitions ==
=== Overview ===
Competition	First match	Last match	Starting round	Final position	Record							
Competition	First match	Last match	Starting round	Final position	Pld	W	D	L	GF	GA	GD	Win %
Nemzeti Bajnokság I	1 August 2021	15 May 2022	Matchday 1	3rd	33	14	12	7	43	34	+9	42.42
Magyar Kupa	19 September 2021	27 October 2021	Round of 64	Round of 32	2	1	0	1	3	1	+2	50.00
UEFA Europa Conference League	8 July 2021	29 July 2021	First qualifying round	Second qualifying round	4	1	1	2	3	6	−3	25.00
Total					39	16	13	10	49	41	+8	41.03

Source: Competitions

=== Nemzeti Bajnokság I ===
==== League table ====
Pos	Team	Pld	W	D	L	GF	GA	GD	Pts	Qualification or relegation
1	Ferencváros (C)	33	22	5	6	60	31	+29	71	Qualification for the Champions League first qualifying round
2	Kisvárda	33	16	11	6	50	34	+16	59	Qualification for the Europa Conference League second qualifying round (Note: Since the winners of the 2021–22 Magyar Kupa, Ferencváros, qualified for the Champions League, the Europa Conference League berth awarded to the Magyar Kupa winners was transferred to the highest-placed Nemzeti Bajnokság I team not already qualified for European competition, the fourth-placed team.)
3	Puskás Akadémia	33	14	12	7	43	34	+9	54	Qualification for the Europa Conference League second qualifying round
4	Fehérvár	33	13	9	11	48	43	+5	48	Qualification for the Europa Conference League second qualifying round
5	Újpest	33	12	8	13	50	48	+2	44	

Source: Hungarian Football Federation (in Hungarian), Soccerway
Rules for classification: 1) Points; 2) Matches won; 3) Goal difference; 4) Goals scored; 5) Head-to-head points; 6) Head-to-head goal difference; 7) Head-to-head away goals scored; 8) Fair play ranking; 9) Drawing of lots.
(C) Champions

==== Results summary ====
Overall								Home						Away					
Pld	W	D	L	GF	GA	GD	Pts	W	D	L	GF	GA	GD	W	D	L	GF	GA	GD
33	14	12	7	43	34	+9	54	8	3	5	23	19	+4	6	9	2	20	15	+5

Source: Soccerway

==== Results by round ====
Round	1	2	3	4	5	6	7	8	9	10	11	12	13	14	15	16	17	18	19	20	21	22	23	24	25	26	27	28	29	30	31	32	33
Ground	A	H	A	H	A	H	A	H	A	A	H	H	A	H	A	H	A	H	A	H	H	A	A	H	A	H	A	H	A	H	A	A	H
Result	W	L	W	W	W	L	D	W	W	W	W	W	L	D	D	W	D	W	W	L	L	D	L	W	D	D	D	D	D	W	D	D	L
Position	4	7	4	2	2	3	4	3	2	1	1	1	2	2	3	2	3	2	1	2	2	2	2	2	2	2	2	2	3	2	3	3	3

Source: Matches
A = Away; H = Home; W = Win; D = Draw; L = Loss

==== Matches ====
1 August 2021 1	Újpest	1–2	Puskás Akadémia	Budapest
20:00 CEST	Katona 64'	Report	Băluță 43'; Nunes 56'	Stadium: Szusza Ferenc Stadion; Attendance: 1,533; Referee: Csaba Pintér

8 August 2021 2	Puskás Akadémia	1–6	Paks	Felcsút
20:00 CEST	Plšek 55'	Report	Sajbán 15', 66'; Bognár 37', 69'; Ádám 46'; Nagy 59'	Stadium: Pancho Aréna; Attendance: 782; Referee: Péter Antal

15 August 2021 3	Zalaegerszeg	1–3	Puskás Akadémia	Zalaegerszeg
17:45 CEST	Skribek 13'	Report	Favorov 54'; Puljić 67'; Corbu 90+2'	Stadium: ZTE Arena; Attendance: 1,737; Referee: Gergő Bogár
Note: The match is interrupted due to bad weather.

27 January 2022 4	Puskás Akadémia	1–0	Ferencváros	Felcsút
18:30 CET	Nunes 49'	Report		Stadium: Pancho Aréna; Attendance: 2,161; Referee: Tamás Bognár

29 August 2021 5	Gyirmót	0–1	Puskás Akadémia	Győr
17:45 CEST		Report	Nagy 63'	Stadium: Ménfői úti Stadion; Attendance: 2,086; Referee: Balázs Berke

12 September 2021 6	Puskás Akadémia	0–1	Kisvárda	Felcsút
17:30 CEST		Report	Bumba 42'	Stadium: Pancho Aréna; Attendance: 880; Referee: Ádám Farkas

25 September 2021 7	Fehérvár	0–0	Puskás Akadémia	Székesfehérvár
19:30 CEST		Report		Stadium: MOL Aréna Sóstó; Attendance: 2,014; Referee: Péter Solymosi

2 October 2021 8	Puskás Akadémia	2–0	Mezőkövesd	Felcsút
17:00 CEST	Lakvekheliani 19' (o.g.); Băluță 63'	Report		Stadium: Pancho Aréna; Attendance: 822; Referee: Csaba Pintér

15 October 2021 9	MTK Budapest	0–1	Puskás Akadémia	Budapest
20:00 CEST		Report	Komáromi 69'	Stadium: Hidegkuti Nándor Stadion; Attendance: 1,675; Referee: Ferenc Karakó

24 October 2021 10	Debrecen	0–3	Puskás Akadémia	Debrecen
13:30 CEST		Report	Puljić 22'; Kozák 28', 69'	Stadium: Nagyerdei Stadion; Attendance: 3,400; Referee: Csaba Pintér

31 October 2021 11	Puskás Akadémia	3–1	Budapest Honvéd	Felcsút
17:00 CET	Plšek 47', 71' (pen.); Mezghrani 87' (o.g.)	Report	Nono 17'	Stadium: Pancho Aréna; Attendance: 1,500; Referee: Gergő Bogár

6 November 2021 12	Puskás Akadémia	2–1	Újpest	Felcsút
17:00 CET	Băluță 50'; Kozák 90'	Report	Beridze 90+7'	Stadium: Pancho Aréna; Attendance: 500; Referee: Balázs Berke

20 November 2021 13	Paks	4–1	Puskás Akadémia	Paks
12:30 CET	Ádám 8'; Böde 26'; Bognár 46'; Sajbán 90'	Report	Corbu 87'	Stadium: Fehérvári úti Stadion; Attendance: 1,198; Referee: Ferenc Karakó

28 November 2021 14	Puskás Akadémia	1–1	Zalaegerszeg	Felcsút
15:45 CET	Plšek 47'	Report	Zimonyi 90+3'	Stadium: Pancho Aréna; Attendance: 600; Referee: Péter Solymosi

4 December 2021 15	Ferencváros	1–1	Puskás Akadémia	Budapest
15:30 CET	Laïdouni 31'	Report	Băluță 50'	Stadium: Groupama Arena; Attendance: 6,011; Referee: Sándor Andó-Szabó

11 December 2021 16	Puskás Akadémia	3–0	Gyirmót	Felcsút
15:45 CET	Slagveer 53', 80'; Corbu 65'	Report		Stadium: Pancho Aréna; Attendance: 586; Referee: Péter Antal

19 December 2021 17	Kisvárda	1–1	Puskás Akadémia	Kisvárda
13:00 CET	Bumba 28' (pen.)	Report	Corbu 4'	Stadium: Várkerti Stadion; Attendance: 1,890; Referee: Balázs Berke

30 January 2022 18	Puskás Akadémia	1–0	Fehérvár	Felcsút
13:00 CET	Favorov 67'	Report		Stadium: Pancho Aréna; Attendance: 1,520; Referee: István Vad

6 February 2022 19	Mezőkövesd	1–2	Puskás Akadémia	Mezőkövesd
14:15 CET	Jurina 68'	Report	Băluță 14', 64'	Stadium: Városi Stadion; Attendance: 1,371; Referee: Balázs Berke

12 February 2022 20	Puskás Akadémia	1–2	MTK Budapest	Felcsút
19:30 CET	Skribek 78'	Report	Futács 33'; Ramadani 69'	Stadium: Pancho Aréna; Attendance: 749; Referee: Gergő Bogár

20 February 2022 21	Puskás Akadémia	0–2	Debrecen	Felcsút
15:30 CET		Report	Do. Babunski 17', 69'	Stadium: Pancho Aréna; Attendance: 1,225; Referee: Csaba Pintér

26 February 2022 22	Budapest Honvéd	0–0	Puskás Akadémia	Budapest
17:00 CET		Report		Stadium: Bozsik Aréna; Attendance: 2,472; Referee: József Erdős

5 March 2022 23	Újpest	2–1	Puskás Akadémia	Budapest
17:00 CET	Zivzivadze 32'; Pauljević 72'	Report	Favorov 26'	Stadium: Szusza Ferenc Stadion; Attendance: 2,512; Referee: Tamás Bognár

11 March 2022 24	Puskás Akadémia	2–0	Paks	Felcsút
20:00 CET	Favorov 9'; Nunes 67'	Report		Stadium: Pancho Aréna; Attendance: 883; Referee: Balázs Berke

19 March 2022 25	Zalaegerszeg	0–0	Puskás Akadémia	Zalaegerszeg
17:45 CET		Report		Stadium: ZTE Arena; Attendance: 1,812; Referee: Csaba Pintér

3 April 2022 26	Puskás Akadémia	2–2	Ferencváros	Felcsút
17:00 CEST	Kozák 52'; Stronati 56'	Report	Esiti 18'; R. Mmaee 49'	Stadium: Pancho Aréna; Attendance: 3,340; Referee: Ferenc Karakó

9 April 2022 27	Gyirmót	1–1	Puskás Akadémia	Győr
17:00 CEST	Ikić 16'	Report	Băluță 82'	Stadium: Ménfői úti Stadion; Attendance: 1,020; Referee: Péter Zierkelbach

17 April 2022 28	Puskás Akadémia	0–0	Kisvárda	Felcsút
17:00 CEST		Report		Stadium: Pancho Aréna; Attendance: 1,465; Referee: Berke Balázs

23 April 2022 29	Fehérvár	2–2	Puskás Akadémia	Székesfehérvár
20:00 CEST	Kodro 3'; Stopira 90+5'	Report	Zahedi 25', 53'; Băluță (yellow card) 5' (yellow-red card) 90+1'	Stadium: MOL Aréna Sóstó; Attendance: 3,103; Referee: Tamás Bognár

30 April 2022 30	Puskás Akadémia	3–1	Mezőkövesd	Felcsút
14:45 CEST	Urblík 31'Zahedi 44', 50'	Report	Dražić 28'	Stadium: Pancho Aréna; Attendance: 700; Referee: József Erdős

4 May 2022 31	MTK Budapest	0–0	Puskás Akadémia	Budapest
17:00 CEST		Report		Stadium: Hidegkuti Nándor Stadion; Attendance: 1,314; Referee: István Vad

7 May 2022 32	Debrecen	1–1	Puskás Akadémia	Debrecen
14:45 CEST	Bódi 34'	Report	Favorov 63'	Stadium: Nagyerdei Stadion; Attendance: 3,621; Referee: Balázs Berke

15 May 2022 33	Puskás Akadémia	1–2	Budapest Honvéd	Felcsút
16:00 CEST	Favorov 45+1'	Report	Lukić 5'; Zsótér 14'	Stadium: Pancho Aréna; Attendance: 3,000; Referee: István Vad

=== Magyar Kupa ===
19 September 2021 Round of 64	Siófok	0–3	Puskás Akadémia	Siófok
18:00 CEST		Report	Júnior 14'; Gera 70'; Kozák 90'	Stadium: Révész Géza utcai Stadion; Attendance: 400; Referee: Szabolcs Szilasi

27 October 2021 Round of 32	Győr	1–0	Puskás Akadémia	Győr
17:00 CEST	Vernes 47'	Report		Stadium: ETO Park; Attendance: 650; Referee: Márk Szigetvári

=== UEFA Europa Conference League ===
==== First qualifying round ====
8 July 2021 First leg	Inter Turku (Finland)	1–1	(Hungary) Puskás Akadémia	Turku, Finland
18:30 EEST (UTC+3)	Källman 59'	Report	Plšek 76'	Stadium: Veritas Stadion; Attendance: 1,556; Referee: Tore Hansen (Norway)

15 July 2021 Second leg	Puskás Akadémia (Hungary)	2–0 (3–1 agg.)	(Finland) Inter Turku	Felcsút, Hungary
20:00 CEST (UTC+2)	Annan 4' (o.g.); van Nieff 87'	Report		Stadium: Pancho Aréna; Attendance: 1,393; Referee: Athanasios Tzilos (Greece)

==== Second qualifying round ====
22 July 2021 First leg	Rīgas FS (Latvia)	3–0	(Hungary) Puskás Akadémia	Jūrmala, Latvia
19:00 EEST (UTC+3)	Lemajić 8', 25' (pen.); Friesenbichler 18'	Report		Stadium: Slokas Stadium; Attendance: 315; Referee: Goga Kikacheishvili ((Georgia))

29 July 2021 Second leg	Puskás Akadémia (Hungary)	0–2 (0–5 agg.)	(Latvia) Rīgas FS	Felcsút, Hungary
20:00 CEST (UTC+2)		Report	Lemajić 52'; Deocleciano 69'	Stadium: Pancho Aréna; Attendance: 980; Referee: Walter Altmann ((Austria))

=== Appearances and goals ===
Last updated on 7 May 2022.

No.	Pos	Nat	Player	Total		Nemzeti Bajnokság I		UEFA Europa Conference League		Magyar Kupa	
No.	Pos	Nat	Player	Apps	Goals	Apps	Goals	Apps	Goals	Apps	Goals
1	GK	(Hungary) HUN	Balázs Tóth	14	-17	10	-11	4	-6	0	-0
2	DF	(Belgium) BEL	Mohamed Mezghrani	2	0	2	0	0	0	0	0
3	DF	(Portugal) POR	João Nunes	22	3	16	3	4	0	2	0
6	MF	(Netherlands) NED	Yoell van Nieff	26	1	20	0	4	1	2	0
7	DF	(Hungary) HUN	István Csirmaz	9	0	7	0	0	0	2	0
8	MF	(Slovakia) SVK	Jozef Urblík	7	0	7	0	0	0	0	0
9	FW	(Czech Republic) CZE	Libor Kozák	23	4	19	3	2	0	2	1
10	MF	(Romania) ROU	Alexandru Băluță	22	6	17	6	3	0	2	0
11	FW	(Netherlands) NED	Luciano Slagveer	24	2	18	2	4	0	2	0
12	FW	(Iran) IRI	Shahab Zahedi	8	4	8	4	0	0	0	0
14	FW	(Hungary) HUN	Dániel Gera	19	1	18	0	0	0	1	1
15	MF	(Czech Republic) CZE	Jakub Plšek	26	5	20	4	4	1	2	0
17	DF	(Czech Republic) CZE	Patrizio Stronati	21	0	17	0	4	0	0	0
18	MF	(Romania) ROU	Marius Corbu	28	4	23	4	3	0	2	0
19	MF	(Ukraine) UKR	Artem Favorov	35	6	30	6	3	0	2	0
21	FW	(Croatia) CRO	Jakov Puljić	15	2	11	2	3	0	1	0
22	DF	(Hungary) HUN	Roland Szolnoki	18	0	17	0	0	0	1	0
23	DF	(Hungary) HUN	Csaba Spandler	28	0	22	0	4	0	2	0
24	GK	(Hungary) HUN	Tamás Markek	17	-15	15	-14	0	-0	2	-1
25	DF	(Hungary) HUN	Zsolt Nagy	24	1	19	1	4	0	1	0
34	GK	(Hungary) HUN	Ágoston Kiss	0	0	0	-0	0	-0	0	-0
35	MF	(Ukraine) UKR	Kyrylo Yanitskyi	1	0	1	0	0	0	0	0
67	MF	(Hungary) HUN	Balázs Bakti	7	0	6	0	0	0	1	0
77	MF	(Hungary) HUN	Alen Skribek	8	1	8	1	0	0	0	0
90	FW	(Brazil) BRA	Weslen Júnior	4	1	3	0	0	0	1	1
97	FW	(Hungary) HUN	György Komáromi	25	1	20	1	3	0	2	0
99	DF	(Hungary) HUN	László Deutsch	10	0	5	0	3	0	2	0
Youth players:
5	MF	(Hungary) HUN	Norbert Kiss	0	0	0	0	0	0	0	0
43	DF	(Ukraine) UKR	Artem Nahirnyj	0	0	0	0	0	0	0	0
57	MF	(Hungary) HUN	Vajk Gazdag	0	0	0	0	0	0	0	0
88	DF	(Hungary) HUN	Bendegúz Farkas	0	0	0	0	0	0	0	0
Out to loan:
26	MF	(Hungary) HUN	Gergely Mim	0	0	0	0	0	0	0	0
33	DF	(Hungary) HUN	Gergő Major	0	0	0	0	0	0	0	0
71	MF	(Hungary) HUN	Patrik Posztobányi	1	0	1	0	0	0	0	0
87	MF	(Hungary) HUN	Gergő Ominger	0	0	0	0	0	0	0	0
Players no longer at the club:
7	FW	(Hungary) HUN	Tamás Kiss	6	0	2	0	4	0	0	0
49	FW	(Hungary) HUN	Krisztián Géresi	7	0	6	0	1	0	0	0
70	FW	(Hungary) HUN	Zsombor Gruber	1	0	0	0	1	0	0	0

=== Top scorers ===
Includes all competitive matches. The list is sorted by shirt number when total goals are equal.

Last updated on 15 May 2022

Position	Nation	Number	Name	Nemzeti Bajnokság I	UEFA Europa Conference League	Magyar Kupa	Total
1	(Romania)	10	Alexandru Băluță	7	0	0	7
2	(Ukraine)	19	Artem Favorov	6	0	0	6
3	(Iran)	12	Shahab Zahedi	4	0	0	4
4	(Romania)	18	Marius Corbu	4	0	0	4
5	(Czech Republic)	15	Jakub Plšek	4	1	0	5
6	(Czech Republic)	9	Libor Kozák	3	0	1	4
7	(Portugal)	3	João Nunes	3	0	0	3
8	(Croatia)	21	Jakov Puljić	2	0	0	2
9	(Netherlands)	11	Luciano Slagveer	2	0	0	2
10	(Netherlands)	6	Yoell van Nieff	0	1	0	1
11	(Hungary)	25	Zsolt Nagy	1	0	0	1
12	(Hungary)	97	György Komáromi	1	0	0	1
13	(Hungary)	77	Alen Skribek	1	0	0	1
14	(Brazil)	90	Weslen Júnior	0	0	1	1
15	(Hungary)	14	Dániel Gera	0	0	1	1
/	/	/	Own Goals	2	1	0	3
			TOTALS	40	3	3	46

=== Disciplinary record ===
Includes all competitive matches. Players with 1 card or more included only.

Last updated on 13 March 2022

Position	Nation	Number	Name	Nemzeti Bajnokság I		UEFA Europa; Conference League		Magyar Kupa		Total (Hu Total)	
Position	Nation	Number	Name	Yellow card	Red card	Yellow card	Red card	Yellow card	Red card	Yellow card	Red card
GK	(Hungary)	1	Balázs Tóth	1	0	0	0	0	0	1 (1)	0 (0)
DF	(Portugal)	3	João Nunes	6	1	0	0	0	1	6 (6)	2 (1)
MF	(Netherlands)	6	Yoell van Nieff	6	1	2	0	0	0	8 (6)	1 (1)
FW	(Hungary)	7	Tamás Kiss	0	0	1	0	0	0	1 (0)	0 (0)
FW	(Czech Republic)	9	Libor Kozák	5	0	0	0	0	0	5 (5)	0 (0)
MF	(Romania)	10	Alexandru Băluță	5	1	0	0	0	0	5 (5)	1 (1)
FW	(Netherlands)	11	Luciano Slagveer	5	0	0	0	0	0	5 (5)	0 (0)
FW	(Hungary)	14	Dániel Gera	4	0	0	0	0	0	4 (4)	0 (0)
MF	(Czech Republic)	15	Jakub Plšek	3	0	0	0	0	0	3 (3)	0 (0)
MF	(Romania)	18	Marius Corbu	2	0	1	0	0	0	3 (2)	0 (0)
MF	(Ukraine)	19	Artem Favorov	4	0	0	0	0	0	4 (4)	0 (0)
FW	(Croatia)	21	Jakov Puljić	2	0	0	0	0	0	2 (2)	0 (0)
DF	(Hungary)	22	Roland Szolnoki	3	1	0	0	1	0	4 (3)	1 (1)
DF	(Hungary)	23	Csaba Spandler	3	0	1	0	0	0	4 (3)	0 (0)
DF	(Hungary)	25	Zsolt Nagy	5	1	1	0	1	0	7 (5)	1 (1)
FW	(Brazil)	90	Weslen Júnior	2	0	0	0	0	0	2 (2)	0 (0)
FW	(Hungary)	97	György Komáromi	4	0	0	0	0	0	4 (4)	0 (0)
DF	(Hungary)	99	László Deutsch	1	0	0	0	0	0	1 (1)	0 (0)
			TOTALS	61	5	6	0	2	1	69 (61)	6 (5)

=== Clean sheets ===
Last updated on 13 March 2022

Position	Nation	Number	Name	Nemzeti Bajnokság I	UEFA Europa Conference League	Magyar Kupa	Total
1	(Hungary)	24	Tamás Markek	6	0	1	7
2	(Hungary)	1	Balázs Tóth	5	1	0	6
3	(Hungary)	31	Ágoston Kiss	0	0	0	0
			TOTALS	11	1	1	13
