= Artem Favorov =

Ukrainian footballer

Artem Favorov Артем Фаворов
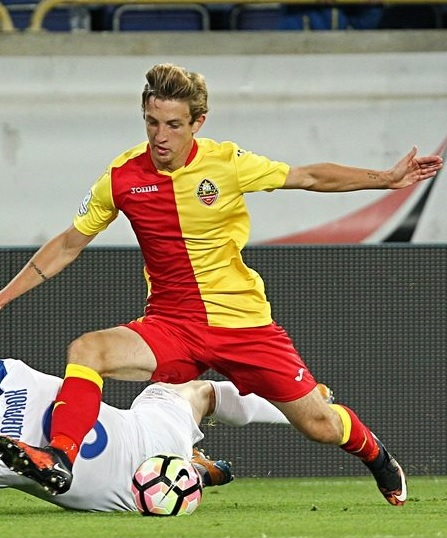

Personal information
- Full name: Artem Volodymyrovych Favorov
- Date of birth: 19 March 1994 (age 32)
- Place of birth: Kyiv, Ukraine
- Height: 1.85 m (6 ft 1 in)
- Position: Midfielder

Team information
- Current team: Puskás Akadémia
- Number: 19

Youth career
- 2007–2011: Dynamo Kyiv

Senior career*
Years	Team	Apps	(Gls)
2011–2013	Dynamo Kyiv	0	(0)
2011	→ Chornomorets-2 Odesa (loan)	12	(2)
2012–2013	→ Dynamo-2 Kyiv	26	(2)
2013–2016	Obolon-Brovar Kyiv	81	(35)
2016–2017	Zirka Kropyvnytskyi	20	(3)
2017	→ Vejle Boldklub (loan)	13	(4)
2017–2020	Desna Chernihiv	56	(14)
2020–	Puskás Akadémia	140	(19)
2020–2021	→ Zalaegerszeg (loan)	28	(8)

International career^{‡}
2010	Ukraine U16	7	(0)
2010–2011	Ukraine U17	5	(1)
2014–2016	Ukraine U21	10	(3)
- * Club domestic league appearances and goals as of 10 March 2026 ‡ National team caps and goals as of 3 January 2020

Artem Favorov (Ukrainian: Артем Володимирович Фаворов; born 19 March 1994) is a Ukrainian professional footballer who plays as a striker for Puskás Akadémia.

== Career ==
Favorov is a product of the Dynamo Kyiv youth academy.

=== FC Obolon-Brovar Kyiv ===
From 2013 to 2016 he played for Obolon-Brovar Kyiv in the Ukrainian First League.

=== Vejle Boldklub ===
In 2017 he moved to Danish club Vejle Boldklub. He scored against Næstved Boldklub and won the 2017–18 Danish 1st Division with the club.

=== FC Desna Chernihiv ===
In 2018 he signed a contract with FC Desna Chernihiv in the Ukrainian Premier League, where he played with his older brother Denys Favorov. With FC Desna Chernihiv got the Round of 16 of the 2018–19 Ukrainian Cup. He played 57 matches and scored 14 goals.

=== Puskás Akadémia FC ===
In 2020, Favorov signed a 2.5 years contract with Puskás Akadémia in the Nemzeti Bajnokság I, the top flight of the Hungarian football system. He scored his first goal on 8 February against Paksi FC. In all, he made 10 appearances, helping the club qualify for the 2020–21 Europa League first qualifying round.

=== Loan to Zalaegerszeg ===
In summer 2020 he went on loan to Zalaegerszeg in the Nemzeti Bajnokság I for 1 year. In the 2020–21 Nemzeti Bajnokság I season, he scored his first goal in a 3–0 away victory over MTK Budapest. On 23 December he scored his second goal against Újpest FC. On 31 January 2021, he scored his third goal of the season against Paksi FC. On 24 April he scored against his parent club Puskás Akadémia.

=== Puskás Akadémia FC ===
In June 2021 he returned to Puskás Akadémia. On 8 June and 15 June he played against Inter Turku in the 2021–22 UEFA Europa Conference League. On 27 June he played for the second qualifying round of the UEFA Conference League against RFS. On 1 August he played his first match of the 2021-22 Nemzeti Bajnokság I against Újpest. On 18 August he scored his first goal of season his former team Zalaegerszeg.

== International career ==
He was called up to Ukraine's under-23 squad for the Commonwealth of Independent States Cup in January 2014 but was not included in the final squad list.

== Personal life ==
His older brother Denys Favorov is also a professional football player. In 2025, Artem received Hungarian citizenship.

== Outside of professional football ==
In March 2022, during the Siege of Chernihiv, Artem with his brother Denys Favorov and others players raised money for the defense of the city of Chernihiv.

== Career statistics ==
=== Club ===
As of match played 10 March 2026

Appearances and goals by club, season and competition
Club	Season	League			Cup		Europe		Other		Total	
Club	Season	Division	Apps	Goals	Apps	Goals	Apps	Goals	Apps	Goals	Apps	Goals
Dynamo-2 Kyiv	2011–12	Ukrainian First League	7	1	0	0	0	0	0	0	7	1
Dynamo-2 Kyiv	2012–13	Ukrainian First League	19	1	0	0	0	0	0	0	19	1
Dynamo-2 Kyiv	Total		26	2	0	0	0	0	0	0	26	2
Obolon-Brovar Kyiv	2013–14	Ukrainian Second League	31	8	2	1	0	0	0	0	33	9
Obolon-Brovar Kyiv	2014–15	Ukrainian Second League	22	11	2	0	0	0	0	0	24	11
Obolon-Brovar Kyiv	2015–16	Ukrainian First League	28	17	4	1	0	0	0	0	32	18
Obolon-Brovar Kyiv	Total		81	38	8	2	0	0	0	0	89	40
Zirka Kropyvnytskyi	2016–17	Ukrainian Premier League	11	3	1	0	0	0	0	0	12	3
Zirka Kropyvnytskyi	2017–18	Ukrainian Premier League	9	0	0	0	0	0	0	0	9	0
Zirka Kropyvnytskyi	Total		20	3	1	0	0	0	0	0	21	3
Vejle Boldklub (loan)	2016–17	Danish 1st Division	13	4	0	0	0	0	0	0	13	4
Desna Chernihiv	2017–18	Ukrainian First League	12	8	2	0	0	0	0	0	14	8
Desna Chernihiv	2018–19	Ukrainian Premier League	28	5	2	0	0	0	0	0	30	5
Desna Chernihiv	2019–20	Ukrainian Premier League	16	1	1	0	0	0	0	0	17	1
Desna Chernihiv	Total		56	14	5	0	0	0	0	0	61	14
Puskás Akadémia	2019–20	Nemzeti Bajnokság I	10	1	2	0	0	0	0	0	12	1
Puskás Akadémia	2021–22	Nemzeti Bajnokság I	30	6	2	0	3 (Note: Three appearances in Europa Conference League First and Second qualifying round)	0	0	0	35	6
Puskás Akadémia	2022–23	Nemzeti Bajnokság I	27	4	4	0	1 (Note: two appearances in 2022–23 UEFA Europa Conference League Second qualifying round)	0	0	0	32	4
Puskás Akadémia	2023–24	Nemzeti Bajnokság I	26	4	0	0	0	0	0	0	26	4
Puskás Akadémia	2024–25	Nemzeti Bajnokság I	27	3	1	0	4 (Note: four appearances in 2024–25 UEFA Europa Conference League Second qualifying round)	1	0	0	32	4
Puskás Akadémia	2025–26	Nemzeti Bajnokság I	20	1	1	1	2 (Note: two appearances in 2025–26 UEFA Europa Conference League Second qualifying round)	0	0	0	23	2
Puskás Akadémia	Total		140	19	10	1	8	1	0	0	160	21
Zalaegerszeg (loan)	2020–21	Nemzeti Bajnokság I	28	8	1	0	0	0	0	0	29	8
Career total			251	86	23	3	8	1	0	0	385	82

== Honours ==
Desna Chernihiv

- Ukrainian First League: 2017–18

Obolon-Brovar Kyiv

- Ukrainian Second League: 2014–15

Puskás Akadémia

- Nemzeti Bajnokság I Runners-up: 2024–25

Individual

- Top Scorer of Ukrainian First League: 2015-16 (11 goals),
- Top Scorer of Zalaegerszegi: season 2020–21 (7 goals),
- Best Player of Ukrainian First League: 2015-16
- Best Player of Zalaegerszegi in 2020-21
- Top Scorer of Puskás Akadémia: runner-up 2021-22 (6 goals),
