= Marius Corbu =

Romanian footballer (born 2002)

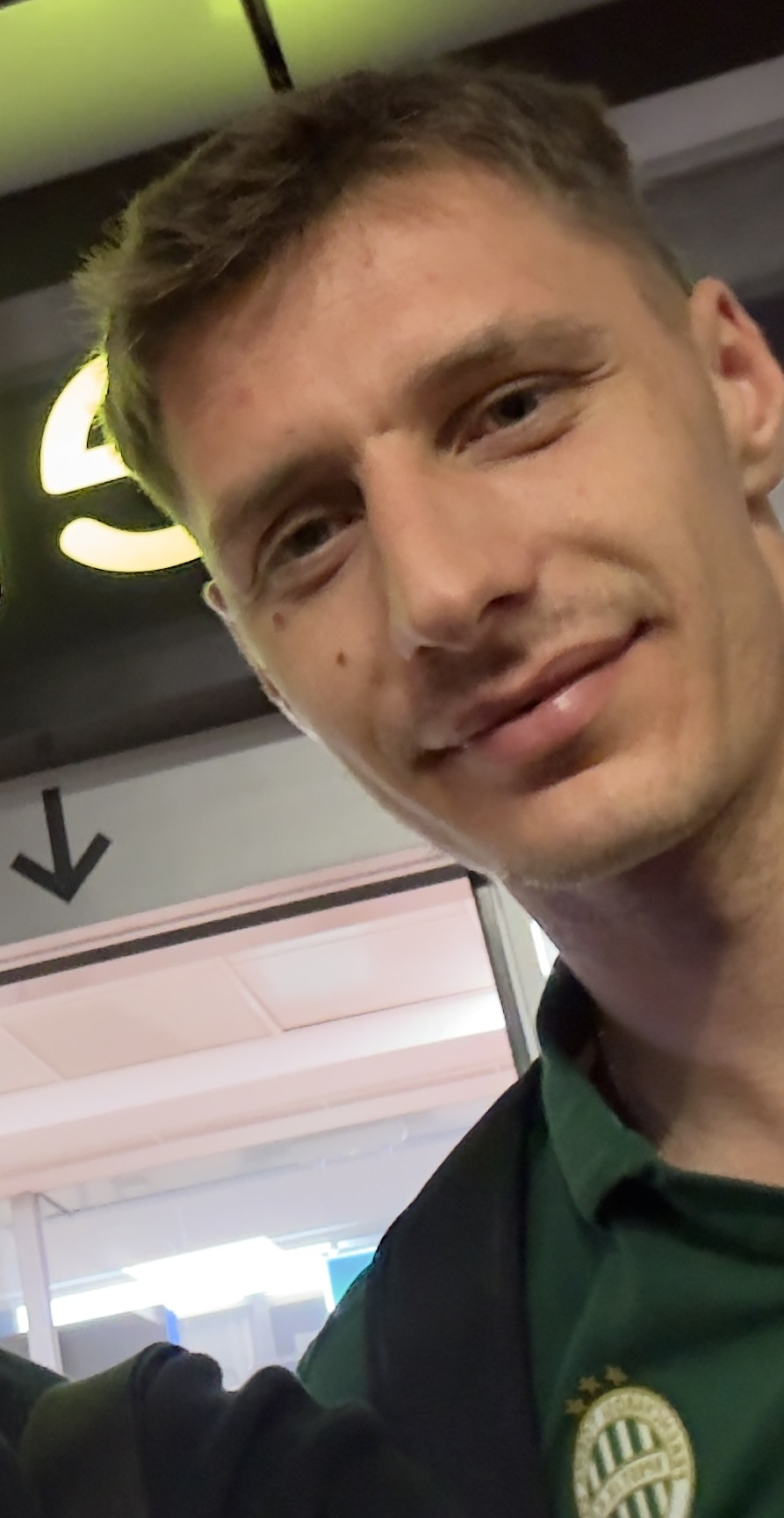
- Corbu with Ferencváros in 2026

Personal information
- Full name: Marius Dumitru Corbu
- Date of birth: 7 May 2002 (age 24)
- Place of birth: Cădărești, Romania
- Height: 1.79 m (5 ft 10 in)
- Positions: Attacking midfielder; winger

Team information
- Current team: Ferencváros
- Number: 17

Youth career
- 2013–2019: Csíkszereda

Senior career*
| Years | Team | Apps | (Gls) |
| 2019–2020 | FK Csíkszereda | 4 | (0) |
| 2020–2024 | Puskás Akadémia | 112 | (12) |
| 2020 | → Csákvár (loan) | 2 | (0) |
| 2021 | → Csákvár (loan) | 1 | (1) |
| 2024–2026 | APOEL | 45 | (7) |
| 2026– | Ferencváros | 24 | (5) |

International career^{‡}
| 2021 | Romania U20 | 2 | (0) |
| 2021–2025 | Romania U21 | 21 | (1) |
| 2026– | Romania | 2 | (0) |
- * Club domestic league appearances and goals as of 22 November 2026 ‡ National team caps and goals as of 17 November 2026

Marius Dumitru Corbu (born 7 May 2002) is a Romanian professional footballer who plays as an attacking midfielder or a winger for Nemzeti Bajnokság I club Ferencváros and the Romania national team.

Corbu began his senior career at Liga II club Csíkszereda in 2019, before transferring to Hungarian side Puskás Akadémia the following year. In 2024, he signed for APOEL in the Cypriot First Division. Corbu returned to Hungary in January 2026 to join Ferencváros, where he won the Magyar Kupa later that campaign.

At international level, Corbu represented Romania under-21 at the 2023 and 2025 UEFA European Championships.

== Club career ==
=== Early career / Csíkszereda ===
Corbu was born in Bacău County, where he attended primary school. He also worked daily on his parents' farm and, less regularly, at his grandfather's pub. Growing up, he was an admirer of Lionel Messi.

Aged eleven, Corbu was taken by his father to Miercurea Ciuc, where he joined Csíkszereda's youth academy. His most influential coaches there were Barna Bajkó and Zoltán Dusinszki. Corbu made his senior debut for Csíkszereda on 21 September 2019, aged 17, starting in a 1–0 away victory over Sportul Snagov in Liga II.

=== Puskás Akadémia ===
In late 2019, Corbu was signed by Hungarian side Puskás Akadémia after representing Csíkszereda at a youth tournament in Dunajská Streda. In 2021, he graduated high school in Gyula. He initially played for Puskás' reserve side, but his progress was accelerated when the COVID-19 pandemic affected the club, leading to his promotion to the first-team squad.

Corbu made his first-team debut on 27 August 2020 in a UEFA Europa League first qualifying round match against Hammarby IF, replacing Weslen Júnior in the 3–0 defeat. Three days later, he made his Nemzeti Bajnokság I debut in a 3–2 home victory over Újpest, also as a substitute.

In the 2020–21 season, Corbu spent part of the campaign on loan at Csákvár, making two league appearances. He scored his first Nemzeti Bajnokság I goal on 18 August 2021, in a 3–1 away victory over Zalaegerszeg. During his four seasons with Puskás Akadémia between 2020 and 2024, Corbu made 112 league appearances and scored 12 goals, helping the club finish as league runners-up once.

=== APOEL ===
Corbu's contract with Puskás Akadémia expired in the summer of 2024. After attracting interest from Heerenveen, Lecce, and Basel, he joined APOEL in the Cypriot First Division as a free agent, signing a four-year contract on 8 July 2024.

Corbu made his Cypriot First Division debut on 1 September, coming on as a half-time substitute and scoring in the 54th minute of a 1–3 home loss to Ethnikos Achna. On 25 September 2024, he won his first senior trophy after APOEL defeated Pafos 1–0 in the Cypriot Super Cup, entering the match as a 66th-minute substitute.

=== Ferencváros ===
On 26 January 2026, Corbu returned to Hungary, joining top flight club Ferencváros for a fee reported to be between €1.3 million and €1.5 million. On 9 May, he won the 2025–26 Magyar Kupa after defeating Zalaegerszeg 1–0 in the final at the Puskás Aréna.

Corbu scored his first goal in European competitions on 5 August 2026, netting in a 1–0 home victory over Polish side Górnik Zabrze in the first leg of the Europa League third qualifying round. He scored again on 27 August, helping to a 4–0 second leg win against Turkish club Trabzonspor in the play-off round (5–0 on aggregate).

== International career ==
In early 2021, before being fully integrated into the Romania under-21 team. He subsequently represented Romania at the 2023 and 2025 European Under-21 Championships.

Corbu made his senior international debut for Romania on 14 November 2026, coming on as a second-half substitute in a 2–1 UEFA Nations League victory against Poland at the Arena Națională in Bucharest.

== Personal life ==
He also has Hungarian origins.

== Career statistics ==
As of match played 22 November 2026

Appearances and goals by club, season and competition
| Club | Season | League | | | National cup (Note: Includes Magyar Kupa, Cypriot Cup) | | Continental | | Other | | Total | |
| Club | Season | Division | Apps | Goals | Apps | Goals | Apps | Goals | Apps | Goals | Apps | Goals |
|---|---|---|---|---|---|---|---|---|---|---|---|---|
| FK Csíkszereda | 2019–20 | Liga II | 4 | 0 | 0 | 0 | — | | — | | 4 | 0 |
| Puskás Akadémia | 2020–21 | Nemzeti Bajnokság I | 20 | 0 | 3 | 0 | 1 (Note: Appearance in UEFA Europa League) | 0 | — | | 24 | 0 |
| Puskás Akadémia | 2021–22 | Nemzeti Bajnokság I | 32 | 4 | 2 | 0 | 3 (Note: Appearances in UEFA Conference League) | 0 | — | | 37 | 4 |
| Puskás Akadémia | 2022–23 | Nemzeti Bajnokság I | 30 | 6 | 5 | 0 | 1 | 0 | — | | 36 | 6 |
| Puskás Akadémia | 2023–24 | Nemzeti Bajnokság I | 30 | 2 | 3 | 0 | — | | — | | 33 | 2 |
| Puskás Akadémia | Total | | 112 | 12 | 13 | 0 | 5 | 0 | 0 | 0 | 130 | 12 |
| Csákvár (loan) | 2020–21 | Nemzeti Bajnokság II | 2 | 0 | — | | — | | — | | 2 | 0 |
| Csákvár (loan) | 2021–22 | Nemzeti Bajnokság II | 1 | 1 | — | | — | | — | | 1 | 1 |
| Csákvár (loan) | Total | | 3 | 1 | 0 | 0 | 0 | 0 | 0 | 0 | 3 | 1 |
| APOEL | 2024–25 | Cypriot First Division | 27 | 3 | 0 | 0 | 7 (Note: Two appearances in UEFA Champions League, two appearances in UEFA Europa League and three appearances in UEFA Conference League) | 0 | 1 (Note: Appearance in Cypriot Super Cup) | 0 | 35 | 3 |
| APOEL | 2025–26 | Cypriot First Division | 18 | 4 | 1 | 0 | — | | — | | 19 | 4 |
| APOEL | Total | | 45 | 7 | 1 | 0 | 7 | 0 | 1 | 0 | 54 | 7 |
| Ferencváros | 2025–26 | Nemzeti Bajnokság I | 11 | 2 | 3 | 0 | 0 | 0 | — | | 14 | 2 |
| Ferencváros | 2026–27 | Nemzeti Bajnokság I | 13 | 3 | 0 | 0 | 12 | 2 | — | | 25 | 5 |
| Ferencváros | Total | | 24 | 5 | 3 | 0 | 12 | 2 | — | | 38 | 7 |
| Career total | | | 188 | 25 | 17 | 0 | 24 | 2 | 1 | 0 | 230 | 27 |

== Honours ==
APOEL

- Cypriot Super Cup: 2024

Ferencváros

- Magyar Kupa: 2025–26
