= Kyrylo Yanitskyi =

Ukrainian football striker

Personal information
- Full name: Kyrylo Vladyslavovych Yanitskyi
- Date of birth: 12 November 2003 (age 22)
- Place of birth: Illichivsk, Ukraine
- Height: 1.85 m (6 ft 1 in)
- Position: Central midfielder

Team information
- Current team: SC Oberpullendorf
- Number: 27

Youth career
- 2016–2017: Chornomorets Odesa
- 2017–2020: Mukachevo
- 2020: Kisvárda

Senior career*
Years	Team	Apps	(Gls)
2020–2021	Puskás Akadémia II	30	(6)
2021–2023	Puskás Akadémia	1	(0)
2022–2023	→ Csákvár (loan)	26	(0)
2023–2025	Puskás Akadémia II	11	(1)
2025–	SC Oberpullendorf	28	(12)
- * Club domestic league appearances and goals as of 5 June 2026

Kyrylo Vladyslavovych Yanitskyi (Ukrainian: Кирило Владиславович Яніцький; born 12 November 2003) is a Ukrainian professional footballer who plays as a central midfielder for Hungarian club Puskás Akadémia II.

== Career ==
=== Puskás Akadémia II ===
He is a product of Puskás Akadémia II in Hungary.

=== Puskás Akadémia ===
Kyrylo Yanitskyi started his career with Puskás Akadémia in Nemzeti Bajnokság I. On 11 November 2021 he made his debut against Gyirmót in the season 2021-22 at the Pancho Aréna in Felcsút replacing Yoell van Nieff at the 82nd minute.
