= Libor Kozák =

Czech footballer (born 1989)

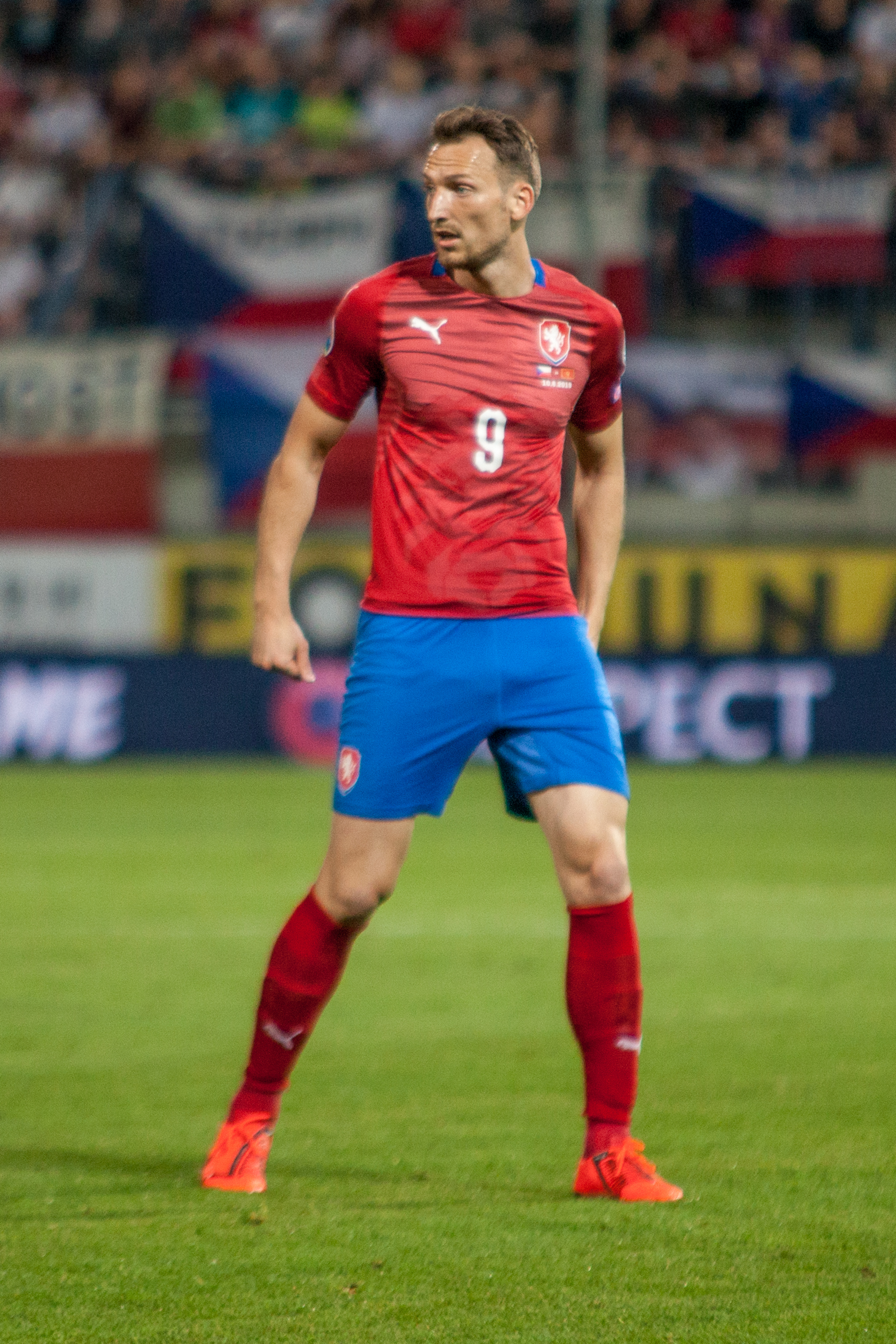
- Kozák playing for the Czech Republic in 2019

Personal information
- Full name: Libor Kozák
- Date of birth: 30 May 1989 (age 37)
- Place of birth: Opava, Czechoslovakia
- Height: 1.92 m (6 ft 4 in)
- Position: Striker

Team information
- Current team: Sparta Prague B (assistant)

Youth career
- 2001–2006: Opava

Senior career*
Years	Team	Apps	(Gls)
2006–2008	Opava	41	(19)
2008–2013	Lazio	58	(10)
2009–2010	→ Brescia (loan)	29	(3)
2013–2017	Aston Villa	20	(4)
2017–2018	Bari	15	(2)
2018–2019	Livorno	9	(0)
2019	Slovan Liberec	10	(7)
2019–2021	Sparta Prague	44	(18)
2021–2022	Puskás Akadémia	25	(4)
2022	Slovácko	11	(1)
2023	Trinity Zlín	12	(4)
2023–2024	Arezzo	8	(0)
2024–2025	Opava	26	(7)

International career
2007–2008	Czech Republic U19	9	(3)
2009–2011	Czech Republic U21	14	(3)
2012–2019	Czech Republic	9	(2)

Managerial career
- 2025–: Sparta Prague B (assistant)
- * Club domestic league appearances and goals

Libor Kozák (born 30 May 1989) is a Czech former professional footballer who played as a striker. He started and ended his career in Opava. Among the most notable clubs where he played were Lazio, Aston Villa and Sparta Prague. He also played for the Czech Republic national football team.

== Club career ==
=== SFC Opava ===
Kozák started his career in 2001 with Czech club Slezský FC Opava, first playing with its youth teams before being promoted to the first team in 2007. Considered a promising talent, Kozák was a prolific goalscorer in the Czech Second Division with Opava. In October 2007, he scored his first hat-trick, coming in a 5–1 Opava win against FC Zenit Čáslav in the second division.

In January 2008, Kozák went on trial with English Premier League club Portsmouth, however he did not join Pompey.

=== Lazio ===
Kozák joined Lazio in July 2008, signing a five-year contract, with rumours that Lazio club president Claudio Lotito paid a €1.2 million ($1.8 million) transfer fee. He later went on loan to Serie B side Brescia in the 2009–10 Serie B to gain experience and regular playing time. On 26 September 2009, Kozák scored his first goal in Italy against Grosseto.

At the end of his loan spell, Kozák returned to Lazio and scored his first goal for the Biancocelesti on 18 September 2010, which turned out to be the winner against Fiorentina. On 16 January 2011, he netted the deciding goal against Sampdoria after coming on as a 77th-minute substitute, before scoring two goals on his full club debut two weeks later, again against Fiorentina. Having achieved four goals in nine starts for Lazio of which four goals came in January, Michal Bílek, manager of the Czech Republic, called Kozák up to the national team and announced he would make a special trip to the Stadio Olimpico to watch his game against A.S. Bari.

Under coach Vladimir Petković in the 2012–13 Serie A, Kozák experienced a two-faced season by failing to score in 19 appearances in Serie A, but finished the season as the leading goalscorer in the Europa League with eight goals. He scored his first club hat-trick against VfB Stuttgart in Rome on 14 March 2013, helping his team reach the last eight by an aggregate score of 5–1.

=== Aston Villa ===
On 2 September 2013, Kozák signed a four-year contract with English side Aston Villa for a €6.5 million transfer fee, being assigned the number 27 shirt. On 14 September 2013, he made his Aston Villa debut at Villa Park, but could not prevent the side from losing 2–1 to Newcastle United. On 21 September 2013, he scored his first goal for Villa, seconds after replacing Christian Benteke, against Norwich City which proved to be the winning goal in a 1–0 victory. The same year on 21 December 2013, he scored the only goal for Villa in a 2–1 loss to Stoke City at the Britannia Stadium.

On 2 January 2014, Villa announced that Kozak had broken his right leg in a training ground collision with teammate Ciaran Clark, and would miss the rest of the 2013–14 season. Complications and further injuries saw him miss the entire 2014–15 season too. He eventually made his comeback 15 months after the initial leg break in March 2015 in an under-21 match against Wolverhampton Wanderers. He made his first team comeback in July 2015 in a 3–1 pre-season defeat to Fulham, scoring for the first time since December 2013. In February 2017, with Kozak's contract running out at the end of season, Aston Villa announced that he would miss the rest of the season undergoing surgery on his ankle. Kozák was released by Aston Villa at the end of the 2016–17 season.

=== Later career ===
On 30 August 2017, Kozak joined Serie B team Bari. He signed with Livorno on 16 July 2018. On 28 May 2019, Kozák returned to his homeland and signed with Sparta Prague.

Kozák joined Hungarian club Puskás Akadémia in Nemzeti Bajnokság I in 2021. He then returned to the Czech Republic, signing for Slovácko on 17 June 2022 before moving to Trinity Zlín on 13 January 2023.

On 8 August 2023, Kozák joined Arezzo in the Italian Serie C. He left by mutual consent on 31 January 2024. On 23 July 2024, Kozák signed a one-year contract with Opava.

== International career ==
On 14 November 2012, Kozák debuted for the Czech Republic national football team in a friendly match against neighbours Slovakia, coming as a substitute for David Lafata in the 67th minute. He scored his first goal in a 1–1 friendly draw against Hungary on 14 August 2013.

== Coaching career ==
On 29 August 2025, Kozák was appointed as an assistant coach of Sparta Prague B.

== Career statistics ==
=== Club ===
As of 9 April 2022

Appearances and goals by club, season and competition
Club	Season	League			National cup		League cup		Europe		Total	
Club	Season	Division	Apps	Goals	Apps	Goals	Apps	Goals	Apps	Goals	Apps	Goals
Opava	2006–07	Czech 2. Liga	15	8	0	0	–		–		15	8
Opava	2007–08	Czech 2. Liga	26	11	0	0	–		–		26	11
Opava	Total		41	19	0	0	–		–		41	19
Lazio	2008–09	Serie A	3	0	0	0	–		–		3	0
Lazio	2009–10	Serie A	0	0	0	0	–		0	0	0	0
Lazio	2010–11	Serie A	19	6	3	1	–		0	0	22	7
Lazio	2011–12	Serie A	17	4	0	0	–		7	1	24	5
Lazio	2012–13	Serie A	19	0	1	0	–		11	10	31	10
Lazio	Total		58	10	4	1	–		18	11	80	22
Brescia (loan)	2009–10	Serie B	29	3	0	0	–		0	0	29	3
Aston Villa	2013–14	Premier League	14	4	0	0	1	0	–		15	4
Aston Villa	2014–15	Premier League	0	0	0	0	0	0	–		0	0
Aston Villa	2015–16	Premier League	4	0	0	0	1	0	–		5	0
Aston Villa	2016–17	Championship	2	0	–		–		–		2	0
Aston Villa	Total		20	4	0	0	2	0	0	0	22	4
Bari	2017–18	Serie B	15	2	1	0	–		–		16	2
Livorno	2018–19	Serie B	9	0	2	0	–		–		11	0
Slovan Liberec	2018–19	Fortuna liga	14	7	1	0	–		–		15	7
Sparta Prague	2019–20	Fortuna liga	31	14	5	4	–		2	0	38	18
Sparta Prague	2020–21	Fortuna liga	13	4	2	0	–		1	0	16	4
Sparta Prague	Total		44	18	7	4	0	0	3	0	54	22
Puskás Akadémia	2021–22	Nemzeti Bajnokság I	22	4	1	1	–		2	0	25	5
Slovácko	2022–23	Fortuna liga	11	1	0	0	–		4	1	15	2
Career total			263	68	18	9	2	0	27	12	308	86

=== International ===
As of 10 June 2019

Appearances and goals by national team and year
National team	Year	Apps	Goals
Czech Republic	2012	1	0
Czech Republic	2013	7	2
Czech Republic	2019	1	0
Total		9	2

Scores and results list the Czech Republic's goal tally first.

International goals by date, venue, cap, opponent, score, result and competition
No.	Date	Venue	Cap	Opponent	Score	Result	Competition
1	14 August 2013	Puskás Ferenc Stadion, Budapest, Hungary	4	Hungary	1–0	1–1	Friendly
2	10 September 2013	Juventus Stadium, Turin, Italy	6	Italy	1–0	2–1	2014 FIFA World Cup qualification

== Honours ==
Czech Republic U21

- UEFA European Under-21 Championship bronze: 2011

=== Individual ===
- UEFA Europa League top scorer: 2012–13
