= Gergő Ominger =

Hungarian footballer

Personal information
- Date of birth: 25 September 2002 (age 24)
- Place of birth: Rábapatona, Hungary
- Height: 1.83 m (6 ft 0 in)
- Position: Central midfielder

Team information
- Current team: Budapesti VSC (on loan from Puskás Akadémia)
- Number: 20

Youth career
- 2008–2017: Győr
- 2017–2019: Puskás Akadémia

Senior career*
Years	Team	Apps	(Gls)
2019–	Puskás Akadémia	6	(0)
2020–2021	→ Puskás Akadémia II	34	(3)
2021–2023	→ Csákvár (loan)	47	(5)
2024	→ Csákvár (loan)	11	(0)
2025–2026	→ Videoton Fehérvár (loan)	9	(0)
2026–	→ Budapesti VSC (loan)	12	(0)

International career^{‡}
2017	Hungary U-16	1	(0)
- * Club domestic league appearances and goals as of 31 May 2026 ‡ National team caps and goals as of 14 September 2017

Gergő Ominger (born 25 September 2002) is a Hungarian football midfielder who plays for Budapesti VSC, on loan from Puskás Akadémia.

== Career statistics ==
As of 9 May 2021.

Appearances and goals by club, season and competition
Club	Season	League			Cup		Continental		Other		Total	
Club	Season	Division	Apps	Goals	Apps	Goals	Apps	Goals	Apps	Goals	Apps	Goals
Puskás Akadémia II	2019–20	Nemzeti Bajnokság III	10	0	—		—		—		10	0
Puskás Akadémia II	2020–21	Nemzeti Bajnokság III	23	2	—		—		—		23	2
Puskás Akadémia II	2021–22	Nemzeti Bajnokság III	1	1	—		—		—		1	1
Puskás Akadémia II	Total		34	3	0	0	0	0	0	0	34	3
Puskás Akadémia	2020–21	Nemzeti Bajnokság I	2	0	0	0	0	0	—		2	0
Puskás Akadémia	Total		2	0	0	0	0	0	0	0	2	0
Career total			36	3	0	0	0	0	0	0	36	3
