= Szabolcs Dusinszki =

Romanian footballer

Personal information
- Date of birth: 6 August 2005 (age 21)
- Place of birth: Odorheiu Secuiesc, Romania
- Height: 1.81 m (5 ft 11 in)
- Position: Attacking midfielder

Team information
- Current team: Puskás Akadémia
- Number: 34

Youth career
- –2020: Odorheiu Secuiesc
- 2020–2021: FK Csíkszereda
- 2021–2023: Puskás Akadémia

Senior career*
Years	Team	Apps	(Gls)
2022–2025	Puskás Akadémia II	39	(6)
2023–	Puskás Akadémia	4	(0)
2024–2025	→ Csákvár (loan)	37	(7)
2025–2026	→ FK Csíkszereda (loan)	20	(0)

International career
2021	Romania U16	1	(0)
2022	Hungary U18	5	(0)
2023	Hungary U19	1	(0)
- * Club domestic league appearances and goals as of 16 May 2026

Szabolcs Dusinszki (born 6 August 2005) is a professional footballer who plays as a midfielder for Nemzeti Bajnokság I club Puskás Akadémia.

== International career ==
Born in Romania, Dusinszki has represented both Romania and Hungary at youth level.
