= Lamin Colley =

Gambian-born English footballer

Personal information
- Date of birth: 5 July 1993 (age 33)
- Place of birth: Gambia
- Height: 1.95 m (6 ft 5 in)
- Position: Forward

Team information
- Current team: Puskás Akadémia
- Number: 9

Youth career
- Farsley

Senior career*
Years	Team	Apps	(Gls)
- Farsley
- Harrogate Railway Athletic
2014–2015	Bradford (Park Avenue)	21	(0)
2015	Stockport County	10	(0)
2016	Bradford (Park Avenue)	18	(3)
2016–2017	Boston United	13	(1)
2017	Farsley Celtic		
- Stalybridge Celtic
- Tadcaster Albion
2019	RAAL	13	(6)
2019–2021	Gorica	33	(11)
2021–2022	Koper	34	(10)
2022–	Puskás Akadémia	90	(21)
2026	→ Diósgyőr (loan)	13	(4)
- * Club domestic league appearances and goals as of 30 May 2026

Lamin Colley (born 5 July 1993) is a Gambian footballer who plays as a forward for Puskás Akadémia.

== Career ==
Colley started his career with English ninth division side Farsley Celtic.

In 2014, Colley signed for Bradford (Park Avenue) in the English sixth division after playing for English eighth division club Harrogate Railway Athletic.

In 2017, he returned to Farsley Celtic in the English seventh division.

Before the second half of the 2018–19 season, he signed for RAAL in the Belgian fourth division.

In 2019, Colley signed for Slovenian outfit Gorica.

For the 2021–22 season, Colley moved from Gorica to Koper.

On 1 June 2022, Colley signed with Hungarian club Puskás Akadémia.

== Honours ==
FC Koper

- Slovenian Cup: 2021–22
