= Martin Auerbach =

Hungarian footballer (born 2002)

- Auerbach playing for Szentlőrinc in 2026

Personal information
- Date of birth: 3 November 2002 (age 24)
- Place of birth: Tatabánya, Hungary
- Height: 1.99 m (6 ft 6 in)
- Position: Goalkeeper

Team information
- Current team: Szentlőrinc
- Number: 74

Youth career
- –2020: Puskás Akadémia

Senior career*
Years	Team	Apps	(Gls)
2020–2024	Puskás Akadémia	3	(0)
2021–2023	→ Csákvár (loan)	61	(0)
2024	→ Mosonmagyaróvár (loan)	8	(0)
2024–2025	Budafok	3	(0)
2025–	Szentlőrinc	5	(0)
- * Club domestic league appearances and goals as of 31 May 2026

Martin Auerbach (born 3 November 2002) is a Hungarian football player who plays as a goalkeeper for Szentlőrinc.

== Club career ==
He made his NB I debut for Puskás Akadémia on 30 August 2020 in a game against Újpest.
