= Márton Radics =

Hungarian footballer

Personal information
- Date of birth: 2 December 2001 (age 24)
- Place of birth: Győr, Hungary
- Height: 1.82 m (6 ft 0 in)
- Position: Defensive midfielder

Team information
- Current team: Aqvital Csákvár
- Number: 32

Youth career
- 2011–2017: Győr
- 2017–2019: Puskás Akadémia

Senior career*
Years	Team	Apps	(Gls)
2019–2025	Puskás Akadémia	18	(0)
2018–2020	→ Puskás Akadémia II	34	(0)
2019–2021	→ Csákvár (loan)	4	(0)
2021–2022	→ Gyirmót (loan)	43	(0)
2022–2023	→ Diósgyőr (loan)	9	(0)
2023–2024	→ Szeged (loan)	7	(0)
2024	→ Mosonmagyaróvár (loan)	15	(3)
2024–2025	Puskás Akadémia II	29	(2)
2025–	Aqvital Csákvár	23	(1)

International career^{‡}
2018–2019	Hungary U18	10	(0)
2019	Hungary U19	6	(0)
2022	Hungary U21	3	(0)
- * Club domestic league appearances and goals as of 31 May 2026 ‡ National team caps and goals as of 7 June 2022

Márton Radics (born 2 December 2001) is a Hungarian professional footballer who plays for Aqvital Csákvár.

== Club career ==
On 11 August 2022, Radics joined Diósgyőr on loan.

== Career statistics ==
As of 15 May 2022.

Appearances and goals by club, season and competition
Club	Season	League			Cup		Continental		Other		Total	
Club	Season	Division	Apps	Goals	Apps	Goals	Apps	Goals	Apps	Goals	Apps	Goals
Puskás Akadémia II	2018–19	Nemzeti Bajnokság III	26	0	0	0	—		0	0	26	0
Puskás Akadémia II	2019–20	Nemzeti Bajnokság III	4	0	0	0	—		0	0	4	0
Puskás Akadémia II	2020–21	Nemzeti Bajnokság III	4	0	0	0	—		0	0	4	0
Puskás Akadémia II	Total		34	0	0	0	0	0	0	0	34	0
Puskás Akadémia	2019–20	Nemzeti Bajnokság I	13	0	6	1	—		0	0	19	1
Puskás Akadémia	2020–21	Nemzeti Bajnokság I	5	0	1	0	1	0	0	0	7	0
Puskás Akadémia	Total		18	0	7	1	1	0	0	0	26	1
Csákvár	2019–20	Nemzeti Bajnokság II	1	0	0	0	—		0	0	1	0
Csákvár	2020–21	Nemzeti Bajnokság II	3	0	0	0	0	0	0	0	3	0
Csákvár	Total		4	0	0	0	0	0	0	0	4	0
Gyirmót	2020–21	Nemzeti Bajnokság II	16	0	0	0	—		0	0	16	0
Gyirmót	2021–22	Nemzeti Bajnokság I	27	0	2	0	—		0	0	29	0
Gyirmót	Total		43	0	2	0	0	0	0	0	45	0
Career total			99	0	9	1	1	0	0	0	109	1
