= György Komáromi =

Hungarian association football player (born 2002)

Personal information
- Full name: György Komáromi
- Date of birth: 19 January 2002 (age 24)
- Position: Winger

Team information
- Current team: MTK Budapest (on loan from Maribor)

Youth career
- 2006–2010: Rákóczifalva SE
- 2010–2015: Szolnoki MÁV
- 2015–2020: Puskás Akadémia

Senior career*
| Years | Team | Apps | (Gls) |
| 2019–2024 | Puskás Akadémia | 100 | (17) |
| 2020–2023 | → Csákvár (loan) | 12 | (3) |
| 2024– | Maribor | 22 | (1) |
| 2025–2026 | → Debrecen (loan) | 23 | (3) |
| 2026– | → MTK Budapest (loan) | 0 | (0) |

International career
| 2017 | Hungary U15 | 3 | (3) |
| 2017–2018 | Hungary U16 | 10 | (3) |
| 2018–2019 | Hungary U17 | 22 | (3) |
| 2019 | Hungary U18 | 2 | (1) |
| 2021–2024 | Hungary U21 | 17 | (0) |
- * Club domestic league appearances and goals as of 23 July 2026

György Komáromi (born 19 January 2002) is a Hungarian footballer who plays as a winger for Nemzeti Bajnokság I club MTK Budapest, on loan from Slovenian PrvaLiga club Maribor.

== Career statistics ==
As of match played 25 May 2025

Appearances and goals by club, season and competition
| Club | Season | League | | | National cup (Note: Includes Magyar Kupa, Slovenian Cup) | | Continental | | Total | |
| Club | Season | Division | Apps | Goals | Apps | Goals | Apps | Goals | Apps | Goals |
|---|---|---|---|---|---|---|---|---|---|---|
| Puskás Akadémia | 2018–19 | Nemzeti Bajnokság I | 0 | 0 | 1 | 0 | — | | 1 | 0 |
| Puskás Akadémia | 2019–20 | Nemzeti Bajnokság I | 0 | 0 | 2 | 1 | — | | 2 | 1 |
| Puskás Akadémia | 2020–21 | Nemzeti Bajnokság I | 16 | 4 | 4 | 0 | 1 (Note: Appearance in UEFA Europa League) | 0 | 21 | 4 |
| Puskás Akadémia | 2021–22 | Nemzeti Bajnokság I | 25 | 1 | 2 | 0 | 3 (Note: Appearances in UEFA Conference League) | 0 | 30 | 1 |
| Puskás Akadémia | 2022–23 | Nemzeti Bajnokság I | 25 | 3 | 2 | 0 | 1 | 0 | 28 | 3 |
| Puskás Akadémia | 2023–24 | Nemzeti Bajnokság I | 29 | 7 | 2 | 0 | — | | 31 | 7 |
| Puskás Akadémia | 2024–25 | Nemzeti Bajnokság I | 5 | 2 | — | | 3 | 0 | 8 | 2 |
| Puskás Akadémia | Total | | 100 | 17 | 13 | 1 | 8 | 0 | 121 | 18 |
| Csákvár (loan) | 2019–20 | Nemzeti Bajnokság II | 2 | 0 | — | | — | | 2 | 0 |
| Csákvár (loan) | 2021–22 | Nemzeti Bajnokság II | 9 | 3 | — | | — | | 9 | 3 |
| Csákvár (loan) | 2022–23 | Nemzeti Bajnokság II | 1 | 0 | — | | — | | 1 | 0 |
| Csákvár (loan) | Total | | 12 | 3 | — | | — | | 12 | 3 |
| Maribor | 2024–25 | Slovenian PrvaLiga | 20 | 1 | 3 | 0 | — | | 23 | 1 |
| Career total | | | 132 | 21 | 16 | 1 | 8 | 0 | 156 | 22 |
