= Patrizio Stronati =

Czech footballer (born 1994)

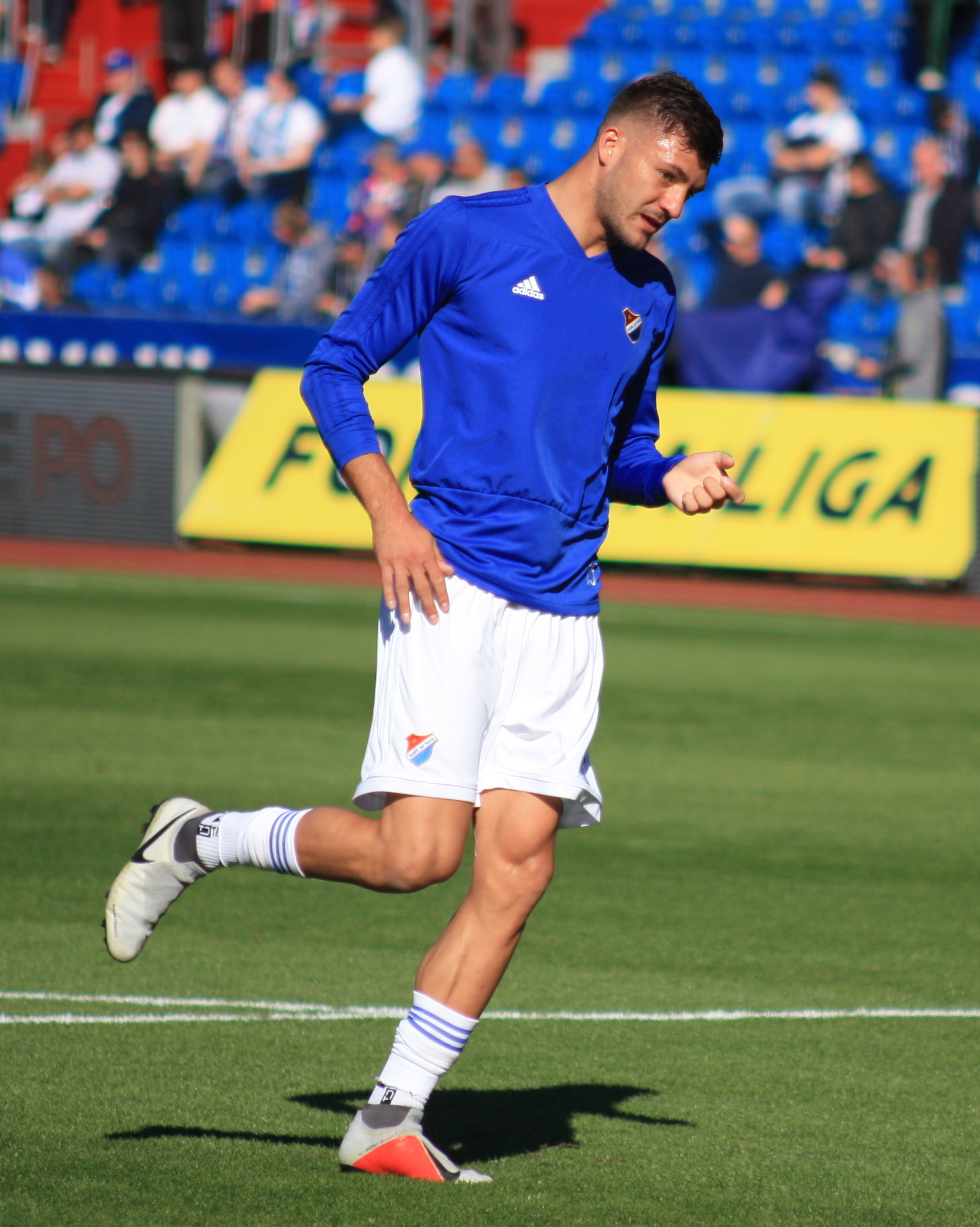

Personal information
- Full name: Patrizio Stronati
- Date of birth: 17 November 1994 (age 31)
- Place of birth: Italy
- Height: 1.90 m (6 ft 3 in)
- Position: Defender

Team information
- Current team: Puskás Akadémia
- Number: 17

Senior career*
Years	Team	Apps	(Gls)
2011–2012	Hlučín		
2013–2015	Baník Ostrava	24	(1)
2015–2018	Austria Wien	18	(2)
2017	→ Mladá Boleslav (loan)	28	(1)
2018–2021	Baník Ostrava	95	(8)
2021–	Puskás Akadémia	140	(3)

International career^{‡}
2013	Czech Republic U19	3	(0)
2014–2016	Czech Republic U20	6	(0)
2015–2017	Czech Republic U21	3	(0)
2022–	Czech Republic	4	(1)
- * Club domestic league appearances and goals as of 30 May 2026 ‡ National team caps and goals as of 11 September 2023

Patrizio Stronati (born 17 November 1994) is a professional footballer who plays as a defender for Puskás Akadémia. Born in Italy, he represents the Czech Republic national team.

== Club career ==
In January 2015, Stronati moved to Austrian Bundesliga side Austria Wien from Baník Ostrava for an undisclosed fee. Stronati made his debut for Austria Wien in a 5–2 win against Rheindorf Altach on 21 February 2015. He scored in the 86th minute. He returned to Baník Ostrava in 2018, signing a four-year contract with his former club. He left the club again in June 2021, when he joined Hungarian team Puskás Akadémia.

== International career ==
In March 2021, Stronati was called up to the senior Czech Republic squad and was on the bench against Wales. He scored on his national team debut, a 5–0 win against the Faroe Islands in November 2022.

== Personal life ==
Stronati was born in Italy to an Italian father and Czech mother.
