= Jakub Plšek =

Czech footballer

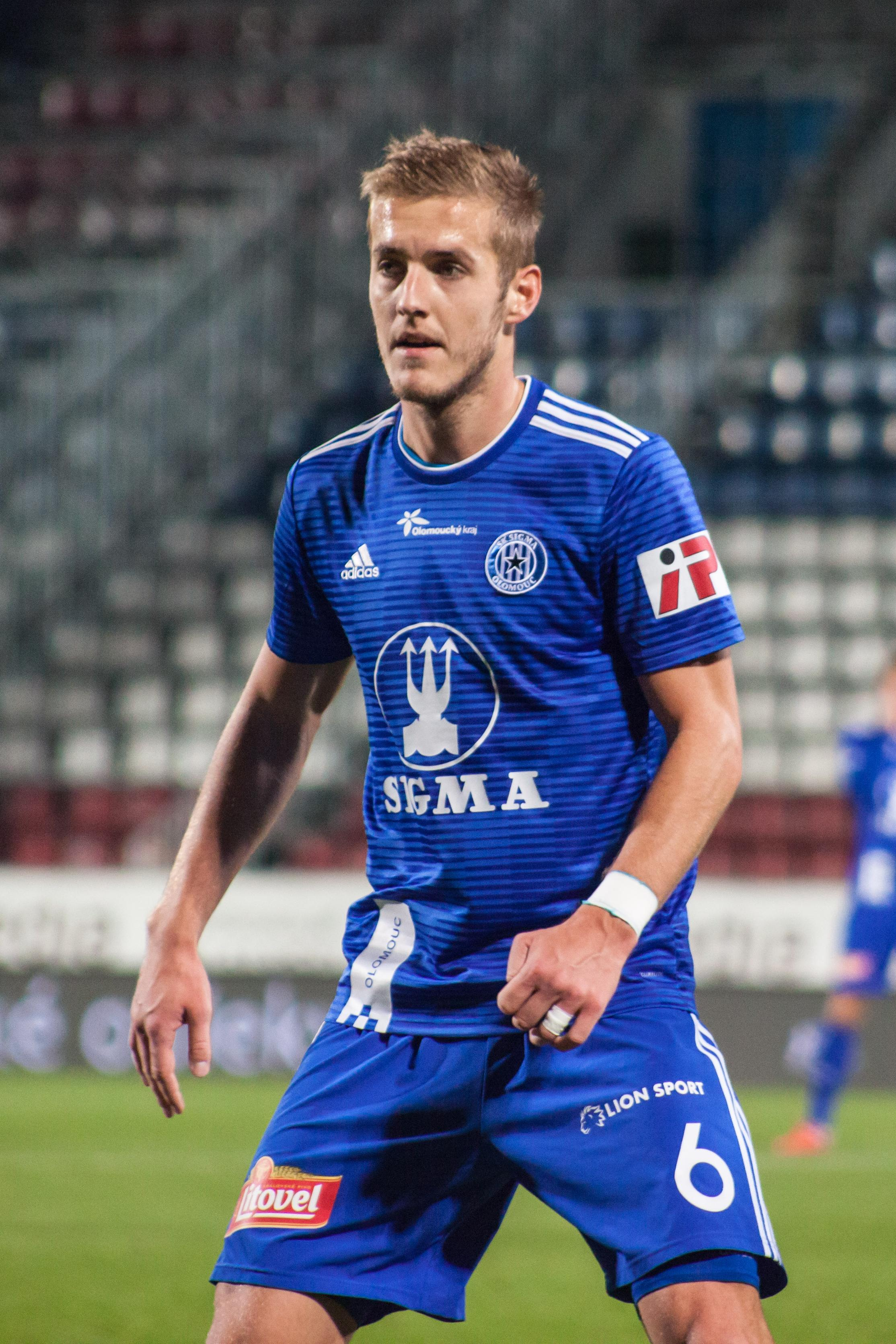
- Jakub Plšek with Sigma Olomouc

Personal information
- Date of birth: 13 December 1993 (age 32)
- Place of birth: Jasenná, Czech Republic
- Height: 1.86 m (6 ft 1 in)
- Position: Midfielder

Team information
- Current team: Dukla Prague
- Number: 20

Youth career
- Sigma Olomouc

Senior career*
Years	Team	Apps	(Gls)
2012–2019	Sigma Olomouc	170	(54)
2020–2025	Puskás Akadémia	137	(25)
2025–2026	MTK	18	(0)
2026–	Dukla Prague	0	(0)

International career^{‡}
2010	Czech Republic U17	3	(1)
2010–2011	Czech Republic U18	6	(2)
2011–2012	Czech Republic U19	11	(2)
2013	Czech Republic U20	2	(0)
2013–2015	Czech Republic U21	6	(1)
- * Club domestic league appearances and goals as of 30 May 2026 ‡ National team caps and goals as of 27 May 2017

Jakub Plšek (born 13 December 1993) is a Czech professional footballer who plays as a midfielder for Dukla Prague in the Czech National Football League.

== Career ==
He made his league debut on 6 October 2012 in a 1–0 Czech First League away win at FK Mladá Boleslav, against whom he also scored his first league goal on 21 April 2013. On 18 October 2016, he scored five goals in a Czech National Football League 7–0 home rout of Prostějov. He finished the 2016–17 National Football League season with a tally of 18 goals in 28 matches, becoming the league's top scorer. He won the Czech National Football League Best Player award in 2017.

On 1 September 2026, Plšek signed a contract with Czech National Football League club Dukla Prague.
