= Tamás Markek =

Hungarian footballer

Personal information
- Full name: Tamás Markek
- Date of birth: 30 August 1991 (age 35)
- Place of birth: Nagykanizsa, Hungary
- Position: Goalkeeper

Team information
- Current team: Puskás Akadémia
- Number: 24

Senior career*
Years	Team	Apps	(Gls)
2010–2011	NTE 1866 MÁV	28	(0)
2011–2015	Lombard Pápa	0	(0)
2011–2015	→ Lombard Pápa II (loan)	26	(0)
2015–2017	Rákosmente	57	(0)
2017–2021	Csákvár	87	(0)
2021–	Puskás Akadémia	52	(0)
- * Club domestic league appearances and goals as of 30 May 2026

Tamás Markek (born 30 August 1991 in Nagykanizsa, Hungary) is a Hungarian association football player, currently goalkeeper for Puskás Akadémia.

== Career ==
Throughout his career, he mostly played in lower divisions. He had to wait until 24 October 2021 for his debut in the top division, where he kept goal for Puskás Akadémia in an away 3–0 victory against Debrecen. A month later, he was awarded for the best save of the month.

== Honours and awards ==
Puskás Akadémia

- Nemzeti Bajnokság I runner-up (1): 2024–25
- Nemzeti Bajnokság I third place (2): 2021–22, 2023–24

=== Individual ===
- NB I – Best save: November 2021

== Sources ==
- "Tamás Markek" (in Hungarian). hlsz.hu.
- Tamás Markek profile at the Hungarian Football Federation website
- Tamás Markek profile at Puskás Akadémia FC official site
- Tamás Markek at Soccerway
