= Puskás Akadémia FC II =

Hungarian football club

Puskás Akadémia
- Full name: Puskás Akadémia Football Club II
- Short name: PAFC
- Founded: 2015; 11 years ago
- Ground: Pancho Aréna, Felcsút
- Capacity: 3,816 (all seated)
- Owner: Felcsúti Utánpótlás Neveléséért Alapítvány
- League: NB III
- 2023–24: NB III, 8th of 20
- Website: www.pfla.hu
Home colours	Away colours	Third colours

Puskás Akadémia Football Club II, commonly known as Puskás Akadémia II, is a football club based in Felcsút, Hungary, that competes in the Nemzeti Bajnokság III, the third flight of Hungarian football.

== History ==
The club was established in 2005 as the reserve team of Puskás Akadémia. The club is currently in NB III, the third Hungarian league.

== Honours ==
- Nemzeti Bajnokság III

Third place (1): 2018–19

== Current squad ==
As of 22 April 2022

Note: Flags indicate national team as defined under FIFA eligibility rules; some limited exceptions apply. Players may hold more than one non-FIFA nationality.

No.	Pos.	Nation	Player
2	MF	HUN	Marcell Fodor
3	MF	HUN	Áron Alaxai
13	MF	HUN	József Magasföldi
17	MF	HUN	Vajk Gazdag
27	MF	UKR	Kirilo Janyickij

No.	Pos.	Nation	Player
32	MF	HUN	Richárd Czár
41	DF	HUN	Ferenc Szin
42	FW	HUN	Tamás Vörös
58	MF	HUN	Zalán Nagy
91	GK	HUN	Ármin Pécsi

== League and cup history ==
Season	Div.	Pos.	Pl.	W	D	L	GS	GA	P	Domestic Cup	Europe	Notes
2015–16	3	11th	39	11	6	15	56	53	39			
2016–17	3	6th	51	16	3	13	54	38	51			
2017–18	3	4th	53	15	5	9	57	34	53			
2018–19	3	3rd	50	13	11	6	53	40	41			
2019–20	3	11th	32	5	1	8	23	22	14			
2020–21	3	8th	38	17	5	16	66	51	56			
2021–22	3											

== See also ==
- Puskás Akadémia FC
