= 2024–25 Puskás Akadémia FC season =

Puskás Akadémia
2024–25 season
- Manager: Zsolt Hornyák
- Stadium: Pancho Aréna
- Nemzeti Bajnokság I: 2nd
- Magyar Kupa: Round of 16
- UEFA Conference League: Play-off round
- Top goalscorer: League: Nagy (12); All: Nagy (16)
- Highest home attendance: 3,528 v Fiorentina, 29 Aug. 2024, Conference League, Play-off round
- Lowest home attendance: 782 v Paks, 14 Dec. 2024, NB I, R17
- Average home league attendance: 1,726
- Biggest win: 7–0 v Szombathelyi MÁV Haladás II (A), 15 Sept. 2024, Magyar Kupa, Round of 64
- Biggest defeat: 0–3 v Ferencváros (A), 29 Sept. 2024, NB I, R8, 0–3 v Győr (H), 7 Dec. 2024, NB I, R16
- All statistics correct as of 24 May 2025.

The 2024–25 season is the 20th season in the history of Puskás Akadémia FC, and the club's eighth consecutive season in the Nemzeti Bajnokság I. In addition to the domestic league, the team is scheduled to participate in the Magyar Kupa and the UEFA Conference League.

== Kits ==
Supplier: 2Rule / Sponsor: MBH Bank / Tippmix

Home	Away	Third	Third alt.

Goalkeeper^{1}	Goalkeeper^{2}	Goalkeeper^{3}

=== Kit usage ===
We indicate in parentheses the number of round.

Kit	Combination									
Kit	Combination	Total			Nemzeti Bajnokság I		Magyar Kupa		UEFA Conference League	
Kit	Combination	Season	Home	Away	Home	Away	Home	Away	Home	Away
Home	Blue shirt, blue shorts and blue socks.	14	5	9	DEB(9) DIO(11) FER(19) KEC(21) FEH(29)	UJP(1) MTK (2nd half)(4.2) PAK(6) FER(8) DEB(20) DIO(22) UJP(23) FER(30)				ARA(QR3.1)
Away	White shirt, white shorts and white socks.	17	7	10	ZAL(2) NYI(3) UJP(12) GYO(16) MTK(26)	KEC(10) ZAL(13) NYI(14) GYO(5) FEH(18) NYI(25) GYO(27)		TBA(R32) NYI(R16)	ARA(QR3.2) FIO(PO.2)	FIO(PO.1)
Third	Light blue shirt, light blue shorts and light blue socks.	7	4	3	MTK (1st half)(4.1) PAK(17) ZAL(24) DEB(31)	DIO(22) PAK(28)		HAL(R64)		
Goalkeeper^{1}	Black shirt, black shorts and black socks.	5	2	3	MTK (1st half)(4.1) GYO(16)	GYO(5)		TBA(R32) NYI(R16)		
Goalkeeper^{2}	Light blue shirt, light blue shorts and light blue socks.	25	11	14	ZAL(2) NYI(3) DEB(9) UJP(12) DIO(11) FER(19) KEC(21) MTK(26) FEH(29)	UJP(1) MTK (2nd half)(4.2) PAK(6) FER(8) KEC(10) ZAL(13) NYI(14) FEH(18) DEB(20) UJP(23) NYI(25)		HAL(R64)	ARA(QR3.2) FIO(PO.2)	ARA(QR3.1) FIO(PO.1)
Goalkeeper^{3}	Orange shirt, orange shorts and orange socks.	6	3	3	PAK(17) ZAL(24) DEB(31)	GYO(27) PAK(28) FER(30)				

ARA: Ararat-Armenia; DEB: Debrecen; DIO: Diósgyőr; FEH: Fehérvár; FER: Ferencváros; FIO: Fiorentina; GYO: Győr; HAL: Haladás; KEC: Kecskemét; MTK: MTK Budapest; NYI: Nyíregyháza; PAK: Paks; TBA: Tatabánya; UJP: Újpest; ZAL: Zalaegerszeg;
QR: Qualification Round; PO: Play-off round (for League Phase); R64: Round of 64; R32: Round of 32; R16: Round of 16;
In Round 4 of Nemzeti Bajnokság, opponent MTK, Puskás Akadémia has changed its kit after the first half.

== First team squad ==
As of 31 January 2025

Team photo:
Note: Flags indicate national team as defined under FIFA eligibility rules; some limited exceptions apply. Players may hold more than one non-FIFA nationality.

No.	Pos.	Nation	Player
24	GK	HUN	Tamás Markek
72	GK	HUN	Bendegúz Lehoczki
91	GK	HUN	Ármin Pécsi
14	DF	POL	Wojciech Golla
17	DF	CZE	Patrizio Stronati
21	DF	ARM	Georgy Arutyunyan
22	DF	HUN	Roland Szolnoki (captain)
23	DF	SUI	Quentin Maceiras
25	DF	HUN	Zsolt Nagy (vice-captain)
33	DF	ENG	Brandon Ormonde-Ottewill
55	DF	HUN	Viktor Vitályos
66	DF	HUN	Ákos Markgráf
76	DF	HUN	Barna Pál
6	MF	CPV	Laros Duarte

No.	Pos.	Nation	Player
8	MF	HUN	Dominik Kocsis
11	MF	UKR	Artem Tyshchuk
15	MF	CZE	Jakub Plšek
16	MF	FIN	Urho Nissilä
19	MF	UKR	Artem Favorov
88	MF	HUN	Bence Vékony
7	FW	GHA	Joel Fameyeh
9	FW	GAM	Lamin Colley
10	FW	SWE	Jonathan Levi
20	FW	FIN	Mikael Soisalo
21	FW	CRO	Jakov Puljić
77	FW	HUN	Kevin Mondovics
99	FW	HUN	Zalán Kerezsi

== Transfers ==
=== Summer ===
In: Note: Flags indicate national team as defined under FIFA eligibility rules; some limited exceptions apply. Players may hold more than one non-FIFA nationality.

No.	Pos.	Nation	Player
—	FW	MGL	Ganbayar Ganbold (loan return from (Slovakia) Komárno)
—	FW	UKR	Yevgeniy Kichun (loan return from (Hungary) Gyirmót)
—	MF	HUN	Marcell Major (loan return from (Hungary) Csákvár)
—	MF	HUN	Márton Radics (loan return from (Hungary) Mosonmagyaróvár)
6	MF	CPV	Laros Duarte (from (Netherlands) Groningen)
—	FW	HUN	Zalán Kerezsi (on loan from (Hungary) Budapest Honvéd)

Out: Note: Flags indicate national team as defined under FIFA eligibility rules; some limited exceptions apply. Players may hold more than one non-FIFA nationality.

No.	Pos.	Nation	Player
—	MF	HUN	Martin Auerbach (to (Hungary) Budafok)
—	DF	HUN	Levente Babós (to (Hungary) Újpest)
—	MF	HUN	Bence Batik (to (Hungary) Debrecen)
—	MF	HUN	Martin Kern (to (Austria) Sturm Graz)
—	MF	NED	Luciano Slagveer (End of contract)
—	GK	HUN	Tóth Balázs (to (Hungary) Fehérvár)
—	MF	ROU	Marius Corbu (to (Cyprus) APOEL)
—	MF	HUN	Gergő Ominger (on loan to (Hungary) Fehérvár)
44	MF	HUN	Szabolcs Dusinszki (on loan to (Hungary) Csákvár)
—	MF	HUN	Patrik Posztobányi (on loan to Mezőkövesdi SE)
—	MF	HUN	Balázs Bakti (on loan to Zalaegerszeg)
—	DF	HUN	Bendegúz Farkas (on loan to Nyíregyháza)
7	FW	HUN	György Komáromi (to (Slovenia) Maribor)

=== Winter ===
In: Note: Flags indicate national team as defined under FIFA eligibility rules; some limited exceptions apply. Players may hold more than one non-FIFA nationality.

No.	Pos.	Nation	Player
21	DF	ARM	Georgy Arutyunyan (from (Russia) Krasnodar)
7	FW	GHA	Joel Fameyeh (from (Russia) Rubin Kazan)

Out: Note: Flags indicate national team as defined under FIFA eligibility rules; some limited exceptions apply. Players may hold more than one non-FIFA nationality.

No.	Pos.	Nation	Player

=== Out on loan ===
Note: Flags indicate national team as defined under FIFA eligibility rules; some limited exceptions apply. Players may hold more than one non-FIFA nationality.

No.	Pos.	Nation	Player
—	MF	HUN	Balázs Bakti (at Zalaegerszeg until 30 June 2025)
—	DF	HUN	Bendegúz Farkas (at Nyíregyháza until 30 June 2025)
44	MF	HUN	Szabolcs Dusinszki (at Csákvár until 30 June 2025)
—	MF	HUN	Gergő Ominger (at Fehérvár until 30 June 2025)
—	MF	HUN	Patrik Posztobányi (at Mezőkövesdi SE until 30 June 2025)
31	DF	HUN	Zsombor Bévárdi (at Budapest Honvéd until 30 June 2025)

=== Contract extension ===
Note: Flags indicate national team as defined under FIFA eligibility rules; some limited exceptions apply. Players may hold more than one non-FIFA nationality.

No.	Pos.	Nation	Player
55	DF	HUN	Viktor Vitályos (until 30 June 2027)
88	MF	HUN	Bence Vékony (until 30 June 2027)
33	DF	ENG	Brandon Ormonde-Ottewill (until 30 June 2027)
19	MF	UKR	Artem Favorov (until 30 June 2027)
24	GK	HUN	Tamás Markek (until 30 June 2026)
25	DF	HUN	Zsolt Nagy (until 30 June 2028)
22	DF	HUN	Roland Szolnoki (c) (until 30 June 2027)
16	MF	FIN	Urho Nissilä (until 30 June 2027)
17	DF	CZE	Patrizio Stronati (until 30 June 2027)

== Friendlies ==
=== Pre-season ===
9 July 2024 Friendly	St. Pölten (Austria)	1–1	Puskás Akadémia	Hausmening, Austria
	Nutz 90' (pen.)	Report	Favorov 31'	Stadium: Peter Lisec Stadion
Note: PAFC 1st half: Markek — Farkas, Golla, Markgráf, Ormonde-Ottewill — Favorov, D. Kocsis, Nissilä — Komáromi, Soisalo — Colley • PAFC 2nd half: Pécsi — Maceiras, Pál, Stronati, Vitályos — Plsek, Szolnoki, Vékony — Bévárdi (Tishchuk (substituted on) 81'), Dusinszki (Mondovics (substituted on) 78') — Puljić

12 July 2024 Friendly	Slovan Liberec (Czech Republic)	1–1	Puskás Akadémia	Austria
11:00 UTC+2	Frýdek 82'	Report	Soisalo 69'
Note: PAFC: Markek — Maceiras, Golla, Stronati, Ormonde-Ottewill (Markgráf (substituted on) 46') — Szolnoki, Plšek (Favorov (substituted on) 61'), Nissilä (Levi (substituted on) 61') — Soisalo (Bévárdi (substituted on) 70'), Zs. Nagy (Farkas (substituted on) 85') — Puljić (Colley (substituted on) 46')

16 July 2024 Friendly	LASK (Austria)	0–0	Puskás Akadémia	Pasching, Austria
16:00		Report		Stadium: voestalpine Stadium
Note: PAFC: Pécsi — Maceiras, Golla, Stronati, Markgráf (Ormonde-Ottewill (substituted on) 63') — Szolnoki, Nissilä (Mondovics (substituted on) 86') — Soisalo (Komáromi (substituted on) 63'), Plšek (Favorov (substituted on) 63'), Zs. Nagy — Colley (Puljić (substituted on) 63')

=== In-season ===
16 January 2025 Friendly	Wolfsberger AC (Austrian I) (Austria)	1–1	Puskás Akadémia	Marbella, Spain
16:00 CET	Ballo 38' (pen.)	Report	Mondovics 33'	Stadium: Banús Football Center
Note: Puskás Akadémia 1st half: Markek — Maceiras, Szolnoki (c), Umathum, Zs. Nagy — Plšek, Duarte — Soisalo, Levi, Kerezsi — Mondovics • Puskás Akadémia 2nd half: Pécsi — Maceiras (Orján (substituted on) 68'), Golla, Stronati, Zs. Nagy — Plšek, Duarte (Colley (substituted on) 68') — Soisalo (Tyshchuk (substituted on) 80'), Levi, Markgráf — Nissilä • Manager: Zsolt Hornyák

20 January 2025 Friendly	Hammarby (Swedish I) (Sweden)	2–3	Puskás Akadémia	Marbella, Spain
15:30 CET	Abraham 26'; Boudah 65'; Madjed (red card) 90+5'	Report	Szolnoki 9'; Golla 52'; Duarte 71'; Markgráf (red card) 90+5'	Stadium: Banús Football Center
Note: Puskás Akadémia: Markek — Maceiras, Golla, Stronati, Markgráf — Szolnoki (c) (Duarte (substituted on) 46'), Nissilä (Plšek (substituted on) 72') — Soisalo (Vékony (substituted on) 46'), Levi (Z. Nagy (substituted on) 72'), Zs. Nagy (Kerezsi (substituted on) 72') — Colley (Mondovics (substituted on) 46') • Manager: Zsolt Hornyák

23 January 2025 Friendly	Seattle Sounders FC (MLS) (United States)	2–0	Puskás Akadémia	Marbella, Spain
16:00 CET	de la Vega 20'; Morris 31'	Report		Stadium: Marbella Football Center
Note: Puskás Akadémia: Pécsi (Lehoczki (substituted on) 78') — Maceiras, Umathum (Orján (substituted on) 46'), Szolnoki (c), Zs. Nagy — Plšek (Szabari (substituted on) 78'), Duarte (Nissilä (substituted on) 16') — Soisalo (Levi (substituted on) 46'), Vékony (Z. Nagy (substituted on) 85'), Kerezsi (Tyshchuk (substituted on) 69') — Mondovics (Colley (substituted on) 46') • Manager: Zsolt Hornyák

== Competitions ==
=== Overall record ===
In italics, we indicate the Last match and the Final position achieved in competition(s) that have not yet been completed.

Competition	First match	Last match	Starting round	Final position	Record							
Competition	First match	Last match	Starting round	Final position	Pld	W	D	L	GF	GA	GD	Win %
Nemzeti Bajnokság I	28/07/2024	24/05/2025	Matchday 1	2nd	33	20	6	7	58	38	+20	60.61
Magyar Kupa	15/09/2024	25/02/2025	Round of 64	Round of 16	3	2	0	1	10	3	+7	66.67
UEFA Conference League	25/07/2024	29/08/2024	Second qualifying round	Play-off round	6	3	3	0	14	7	+7	50.00
Total					42	25	9	8	82	48	+34	59.52

Last updated: 24 May 2025
Source: Soccerway

=== Nemzeti Bajnokság I ===
==== League table ====
Pos	Team	Pld	W	D	L	GF	GA	GD	Pts	Qualification or relegation
1	Ferencváros (C)	33	20	9	4	64	31	+33	69	Qualification for the Champions League second qualifying round
2	Puskás Akadémia	33	20	6	7	58	38	+20	66	Qualification for the Conference League second qualifying round
3	Paks	33	16	9	8	65	47	+18	57	Qualification for the Europa League first qualifying round (Note: Paks qualified for the Europa League as the 2024–25 Magyar Kupa winners. As a result, the second Conference League berth was passed to the team in 4th place.)
4	Győr	33	14	11	8	49	37	+12	53	Qualification for the Conference League second qualifying round
5	MTK	33	13	7	13	53	47	+6	46	

Source: Hungarian Football Federation (in Hungarian)
Rules for classification: 1) Points; 2) Matches won; 3) Goal difference; 4) Goals scored; 5) Head-to-head points; 6) Head-to-head goal difference; 7) Fair play ranking; 8) Drawing of lots.
(C) Champions

==== Results summary ====
Overall								Home						Away					
Pld	W	D	L	GF	GA	GD	Pts	W	D	L	GF	GA	GD	W	D	L	GF	GA	GD
33	20	6	7	58	38	+20	66	12	3	1	34	18	+16	8	3	6	24	20	+4

Last updated: 24 May 2025.
Source: Soccerway

==== Results by round ====
A = Away; H = Home; W = Win; D = Draw; L = Loss

Round	1	2	3	4	6	7	8	9	10	11	12	13	14	15	5^{1}	16	17	18	19	20	21	22	23	24	25	26	27	28	29	30	31	32	33
Ground	A	H	H	H	A	H	A	H	A	H	H	A	A	A	A	H	H	A	H	A	H	A	A	H	A	H	A	A	H	A	H	A	H
Result	W	W	W	W	L	W	L	W	W	D	D	L	W	W	W	L	W	L	W	W	W	L	D	W	W	D	L	D	W	D	W	W	W
Position	2	2	2	1	2	1	2	2	2	2	2	3	2	1	1	1	1	1	1	1	1	1	1	1	1	1	2	2	2	2	2	2	2
Points	3	6	9	12	12	15	15	18	21	22	23	23	26	29	32	32	35	35	38	41	44	44	45	48	51	52	52	53	56	57	60	63	66

Updated to match(es) played on 24 May 2025. Source: Matches
Notes:
^{1} Round 5 match (Győr–Puskás Akadémia) has been postponed to 4 Dec 2024.

==== Matches ====
The match schedule was released on 20 June 2024.

Win Draw Loss Postponed

28 July 2024 1	Újpest	1–2	Puskás Akadémia	Újpest
18:50 CEST	Bese (yellow card) 37'; Geiger (yellow card) 46'; Ljujić 58'; Tajti (yellow card) 63'	Report	Colley 56', 60' (yellow card) 89'; Maceiras (yellow card) 71'; Nissilä (yellow card) 90+4'	Stadium: Szusza Ferenc Stadion; Attendance: 9,112; Referee: Gergő Bogár; Assistant referees: Balázs Buzás, Georgiou Theodoros
Note: Puskás Akadémia: Pécsi — Maceiras, Szolnoki (c), Golla, Stronati — Plšek, Nissilä, Zs. Nagy (Markgráf (substituted on) 90') — Ormonde-Ottewill, Colley (Puljić (substituted on) 90+3'), Soisalo (Komáromi (substituted on) 82') • Manager: Zsolt Hornyák

4 August 2024 2	Puskás Akadémia	2–1	Zalaegerszeg	Felcsút
18:50 CEST	Plšek 5'; Ormonde-Ottewill (yellow card) 37'; Szolnoki (yellow card) 50'; Maceiras (yellow card) 62'; Zs. Nagy 90+1'	Report	Medgyes (yellow card) 47'; Sajbán 66'	Stadium: Pancho Arena; Attendance: 1,321; Referee: Bence Csonka; Assistant referees: Gergő Vígh-Tarsonyi, Ádám Berényi
Note: Puskás Akadémia: Pécsi — Maceiras, Golla, Stronati, Ormonde-Ottewill (Komáromi (substituted on) 57') — Szolnoki (c) (Favorov (substituted on) 72'), Plšek — Nissilä (Vékony (substituted on) 90+2'), Soisalo (Levi (substituted on) 57'), Zs. Nagy — Colley (Puljić (substituted on) 72') • Manager: Zsolt Hornyák

11 August 2024 3	Puskás Akadémia	3–1	Nyíregyháza	Felcsút
20:15 CEST	Komáromi 3'; Levi 35'; Favorov (yellow card) 45'; Plšek 90+2' (pen.)	Report	Farkas (yellow card) 28'; Beke 65'	Stadium: Pancho Arena; Attendance: 921; Referee: Tamás Bognár; Assistant referees: B. Buzás, P. Kóbor
Note: Puskás Akadémia: Markek — Maceiras, Golla, Stronati, Markgráf (Ormonde-Ottewill (substituted on) 81') — Favorov (Plšek (substituted on) 73'), Levi (Colley (substituted on) 81'), Nissilä — Komáromi (Soisalo (substituted on) 73'), Puljić (Vékony (substituted on) 90+5'), Zs. Nagy (c) • Manager: Zsolt Hornyák

18 August 2024 4	Puskás Akadémia	1–0	MTK	Felcsút
20:00 CEST	Favorov (yellow card) 19'; Golla (yellow card) 47'; Levi 51'	Report	Kata (yellow card) 36'; Hey (yellow card) 45'; Kosznovszky (yellow card) 58'; Beriashvili (yellow card) 85'	Stadium: Pancho Arena; Attendance: 1,218; Referee: Ferenc Karakó; Assistant referees: Vencel Tóth II, Ákos Berényi
Note: Puskás Akadémia: Markek — Maceiras, Golla, Stronati, Markgráf (Ormonde-Ottewill (substituted on) 82') — Favorov, Levi (Plšek (substituted on) 73'), Nissilä — Komáromi (Soisalo (substituted on) 82'), Puljić (Colley (substituted on) 73'), Zs. Nagy (c) (Szolnoki (substituted on) 88') • Manager: Zsolt Hornyák

1 September 2024 6	Paks	2–1	Puskás Akadémia	Paks
17:30 CEST	Zimonyi (yellow card) 28'; K. Kovács (yellow card) 36'; Windecker 57' (pen.), 60'	Report	Komáromi 15'; Nissilä (yellow card) 46'	Stadium: Fehérvári úti Stadion; Attendance: 1,877; Referee: Csaba Pintér; Assistant referees: Norbert Bornemissza, Péter Ország
Note: Puskás Akadémia: Markek — Maceiras, Golla, Stronati, Markgráf (Soisalo (substituted on) 52') — Nissilä (Duarte (substituted on) 68'), Szolnoki (c) (Plšek (substituted on) 80'), Levi — Komáromi (Kerezsi (substituted on) 80'), Colley (Puljić (substituted on) 68'), Zs. Nagy • Manager: Zsolt Hornyák

22 September 2024 7	Puskás Akadémia	3–0	Fehérvár	Felcsút
16:30 CEST	Colley 12'; Plšek (yellow card) 53'; Nissilä 62'; Levi 78'	Report	Csongvai (yellow card) 58'	Stadium: Pancho Aréna; Attendance: 2,058; Referee: Mihály Káprály; Assistant referees: Vencel Tóth II, József Aradi
Note: Puskás Akadémia: Pécsi — Maceiras, Golla, Stronati, Ormonde-Ottewill (Levi (substituted on) 76') — Favorov (Duarte (substituted on) 63'), Plšek, Nissilä — Soisalo (Kerezsi (substituted on) 63'), Colley (Puljić (substituted on) 36'), Zs. Nagy (c) • Manager: Zsolt Hornyák

29 September 2024 8	Ferencváros	3–0	Puskás Akadémia	Budapest
18:00 CEST	Maïga (yellow card) 41'; Saldanha 65', 77', 82'	Report	Maceiras (yellow card) 44'; Favorov (yellow card) 81'; Stronati (yellow card) 85'	Stadium: Ferencváros Stadion; Attendance: 11,767; Referee: Gergő Bogár; Assistant referees: István Albert, Balázs Szert
Note: Puskás Akadémia: Pécsi — Zs. Nagy (c), Stronati, Golla, Maceiras — Plšek, Duarte — Nissilä, Levi (Favorov (substituted on) 78'), Soisalo (Kerezsi (substituted on) 78') — Puljić (Colley (substituted on) 70') • Manager: Zsolt Hornyák

4 October 2024 9	Puskás Akadémia	1–0	Debrecen	Felcsút
20:00 CEST	Duarte (yellow card) 41'; Golla 89'; Colley (yellow card) 90+4'	Report	Lagator (yellow card) 33'; T. Szűcs (yellow card) 49'; Megyeri (yellow card) 75'	Stadium: Pancho Aréna; Attendance: 1,195; Referee: Márton Rúsz; Assistant referees: Gergő Vígh-Tarsonyi, Péter Garai
Note: Puskás Akadémia: Pécsi — Maceiras, Szolnoki (c) (Kerezsi (substituted on) 79'), Golla, Stronati — Duarte, Nissilä (Puljić (substituted on) 71'), Plšek (Favorov (substituted on) 62') — Zs. Nagy, Colley, Soisalo (Levi (substituted on) 62') • Manager: Zsolt Hornyák; Player of the match: Wojciech Golla, Puskás Akadémia 8.5 (Source:)

20 October 2024 10	Kecskemét	0–3	Puskás Akadémia	Kecskemét
13:00 CEST	Zsótér (yellow card) 16'; A. Szabó (yellow card) 58'; Pálinkás (yellow card) 70'; Be. Varga (yellow card) 75'	Report	Szolnoki (yellow card) 18'; Colley 31' (yellow card) 49'; Zs. Nagy 36' (pen.); Nissilä 75'	Stadium: Széktói Stadion; Attendance: 2,359; Referee: Balázs Berke; Assistant referees: Georgiou Theodoros, Róbert Horváth
Note: Puskás Akadémia: Pécsi — Maceiras, Golla, Szolnoki (c) (Mondovics (substituted on) 81'), Stronati — Nissilä (Vékony (substituted on) 89'), Favorov — Levi (Plšek (substituted on) 63'), Soisalo, Zs. Nagy — Colley (Duarte (substituted on) 63') • Manager: Zsolt Hornyák; Player of the match: Artem Favorov, Puskás Akadémia 8.0 (Source:)

26 October 2024 11	Puskás Akadémia	1–1	Diósgyőr	Felcsút
14:45 CEST	Colley 3' (yellow card) 57'; Stronati (yellow card) 80'	Report	Chorbadzhiyski (yellow card) 57'; Holdampf (yellow card) 57'; Bényei 68'	Stadium: Pancho Aréna; Attendance: 1,422; Referee: Péter Zierkelbach; Assistant referees: Norbert Bornemissza, István Szécsényi
Note: Puskás Akadémia: Pécsi — Maceiras, Golla, Stronati, Favorov (Kerezsi (substituted on) 82') — Duarte (Plšek (substituted on) 82'), Nissilä — Soisalo, Levi (Szolnoki (substituted on) 68'), Zs. Nagy (c) — Colley (Puljić (substituted on) 68') • Manager: Zsolt Hornyák; Player of the match: Wojciech Golla, Puskás Akadémia 8.0 (Source:)

2 November 2024 12	Puskás Akadémia	1–1	Újpest	Felcsút
16:30 CET	Colley 6' (yellow card) 66'; Golla (yellow card) 13'; Maceiras (yellow card) 16'; Szolnoki (yellow card) 90+5'	Report	Má. Mucsányi 41'; Fiola (yellow card) 54'	Stadium: Pancho Aréna; Attendance: 2,320; Referee: Tamás Bognár; Assistant referees: Georgiou Theodoros, Balázs Huszár
Note: Puskás Akadémia: Pécsi — Maceiras, Golla, Stronati, Favorov — Szolnoki (c), Nissilä (Kerezsi (substituted on) 82'), Duarte — Soisalo (Levi (substituted on) 70'), Zs. Nagy — Colley • Manager: Zsolt Hornyák; Player of the match: Lamin Colley, Puskás Akadémia 7.7 (Source:)

9 November 2024 13	Zalaegerszeg	4–2	Puskás Akadémia	Zalaegerszeg
13:30 CET	Mim 31'; B. Kiss 33' (yellow card) 86'; Croizet 37', 68'	Report	Stronati 41'; Favorov 74'; Maceiras (yellow card) 82'	Stadium: ZTE Arena; Referee: Gergő Bogár; Assistant referees: Balázs Huszár, Péter Ország
Note: Puskás Akadémia: Pécsi — Maceiras, Golla, Stronati, Favorov — Duarte, Szolnoki (c) (Kerezsi (substituted on) 62') — Soisalo (Nissilä (substituted on) 46'), Levi (Mondovics (substituted on) 90+1'), Zs. Nagy — Plšek (Puljić (substituted on) 46') • Manager: Zsolt Hornyák; Player of the match: Yohan Croizet, Zalaegerszeg 8.9 • Best player of Puskás Akadémia: Patrizio Stronati 7.8 (Source:)

23 November 2024 14	Nyíregyháza	0–3	Puskás Akadémia	Nyíregyháza
13:30 CET	Alaxai (yellow card) 12'; D. Nagy (yellow card) 30'; B. Nagy (yellow card) 72'	Report	Levi 41'; Zs. Nagy 58' (pen.); Golla (yellow card) 62'; Favorov (yellow card) 88'; Puljić 90+5'	Stadium: Városi Stadion; Attendance: 4,329; Referee: Bence Csonka; Assistant referees: Balázs Szalai, Róbert Horváth
Note: Puskás Akadémia: Pécsi — Szolnoki (c), Golla, Stronati, Zs. Nagy — Nissilä, Favorov — Soisalo (Duarte (substituted on) 88'), Levi (Plšek (substituted on) 82'), Markgráf (Kerezsi (substituted on) 88') — Colley (Puljić (substituted on) 75') • Manager: Zsolt Hornyák; Player of the match: Zsolt Nagy, Puskás Akadémia 8.2 (Source:)

30 November 2024 15	MTK	0–1	Puskás Akadémia	Budapest
12:30 CET	P. Kovács I (yellow card) 36'; Varju (yellow card) 42'; Németh (yellow card) 90+5' (yellow-red card) 90+5'	Report	Markgráf (yellow card) 11'; Szolnoki (yellow card) 51'; Zs. Nagy 75' (pen.); Maceiras (yellow card) 76'	Stadium: Hidegkuti Nándor Stadion; Attendance: 1,935; Referee: Imre Kovács; Assistant referees: István Albert, Zoltán Horváth
Note: Puskás Akadémia: Pécsi — Szolnoki (c), Golla, Stronati, Markgráf (Maceiras (substituted on) 32') — Favorov, Nissilä — Soisalo (Plšek (substituted on) 84'), Levi (Duarte (substituted on) 62'), Zs. Nagy — Colley (Kerezsi (substituted on) 84') • Manager: Zsolt Hornyák; Player of the match: Artem Favorov and Ármin Pécsi, Puskás Akadémia 7.6 each (Source:)

4 December 2024 5	Győr	0–2	Puskás Akadémia	Győr
19:00 CET	Ouro (yellow card) 56'; Bitri (yellow card) 57'; Heitor (yellow card) 68'; Škvarka (On the bench) (yellow card) 68'; Anton (yellow card) 83'	Report	Zs. Nagy 11'; Golla (yellow card) 59' (goal) 64'	Stadium: ETO Park; Attendance: 1,562; Referee: Péter Antal; Assistant referees: Róbert Horváth, Ákos Berényi
Note: Puskás Akadémia: Pécsi — Szolnoki (c), Golla, Stronati, Maceiras — Favorov, Nissilä — Soisalo (Kerezsi (substituted on) 83'), Levi (Duarte (substituted on) 72'), Zs. Nagy — Colley (Plšek (substituted on) 83') • Manager: Zsolt Hornyák; Player of the match: Zsolt Nagy, Puskás Akadémia 8.3 (Source:)

7 December 2024 16	Puskás Akadémia	0–3	Győr	Felcsút
16:45 CET	Zs. Nagy (yellow card) 63'; Golla (red card) 72'	Report	Benbouali 38'; Bumba 48', 68'	Stadium: Pancho Aréna; Attendance: 1,036; Referee: Péter Zierkelbach; Assistant referees: Gergő Vígh-Tarsonyi, Anita Vad
Note: Puskás Akadémia: Pécsi — Szolnoki (c) (Kerezsi (substituted on) 67'), Golla, Stronati, Maceiras — Favorov (Duarte (substituted on) 58'), Nissilä (Pál (substituted on) 76') — Soisalo, Levi (Plšek (substituted on) 58'), Zs. Nagy — Colley (Puljić (substituted on) 58') • Manager: Zsolt Hornyák; Player of the match: Claudiu Bumba, Győr 8.6 • Best player of Puskás Akadémia: Ármin Pécsi 7.4 (Source:)

14 December 2024 17	Puskás Akadémia	3–1	Paks	Felcsút
19:30 CET	Zs. Nagy 60' (pen.) (yellow card) 82'; Plšek 81' (yellow card) 83'; Colley 88' (yellow card) 89'	Report	Ötvös (yellow card) 59'; B. Tóth 67'; Kinyik (yellow card) 82'	Stadium: Pancho Aréna; Attendance: 782; Referee: Tamás Bognár; Assistant referees: Péter Kóbor, Norbert Bornemissza
Note: Puskás Akadémia: Pécsi — Maceiras, Szolnoki (c), Stronati, Markgráf — Nissilä, Favorov — Soisalo (Kerezsi (substituted on) 84'), Levi (Plšek (substituted on) 69'), Zs. Nagy — Colley (Vékony (substituted on) 90') • Manager: Zsolt Hornyák; Player of the match: Zsolt Nagy, Puskás Akadémia 8.0 (Source:)

1 February 2025 18	Fehérvár	1–0	Puskás Akadémia	Székesfehérvár
17:00 CET	M. Katona 13'; Holender (yellow card) 35'; Csongvai (yellow card) 36'; A. Huszti (yellow card) 69'; Miličević (yellow card) 70'	Report	Colley (yellow card) 31'; Golla (yellow card) 51'; Maceiras (yellow card) 85'	Stadium: Sóstói Stadion; Attendance: 2,315; Referee: Csaba Pintér; Assistant referees: Vencel Tóth II, Péter Ország
Note: Puskás Akadémia: Pécsi — Maceiras, Golla, Stronati, Markgráf — Szolnoki (c) (Favorov (substituted on) 20'), Levi, Nissilä (Mondovics (substituted on) 84') — Soisalo (Vékony (substituted on) 73'), Colley (Fameyeh (substituted on) 84'), Zs. Nagy • Manager: Zsolt Hornyák; Player of the match: Mátyás Katona, Fehérvár 7.6 • Best player of Puskás Akadémia: Zsolt Nagy 7.3 (Source:)

9 February 2025 19	Puskás Akadémia	1–0	Ferencváros	Felcsút
18:00 CET	Zs. Nagy 35' (yellow card) 49'; Pécsi (yellow card) 81'; Markgráf (yellow card) 90'	Report	Makreckis (yellow card) 90+1'	Stadium: Pancho Aréna; Attendance: 3,821; Referee: Gergő Bogár; Assistant referees: Balázs Szert, Bence Belicza
Note: Puskás Akadémia: Pécsi — Maceiras, Arutyunyan, Stronati, Markgráf — Plšek, Favorov — Soisalo (Nissilä (substituted on) 65'), Levi (Vékony (substituted on) 90+4'), Zs. Nagy (c) — Colley (Fameyeh (substituted on) 65') • Manager: Zsolt Hornyák; Player of the match: Mohammad Abu Fani, Ferencváros 8.8 • Best player of Puskás Akadémia: Ármin Pécsi 8.1 (Source:)

15 February 2025 20	Debrecen	1–2	Puskás Akadémia	Debrecen
19:30 CET	Hofmann (yellow card) 14'; Vajda 29'; Dzsudzsák (yellow card) 78'; Malinov (yellow card) 82'	Report	Kerezsi (yellow card) 16'; Zs. Nagy (yellow card) 26' (goal) 56' (pen.); Markgráf (yellow card) 36'; Colley (yellow card) 49'; Plšek 90+5'	Stadium: Nagyerdei Stadion; Attendance: 3,334; Referee: Márton Rúsz; Assistant referees: Georgiou Theodoros, Ákos Berényi
Note: Puskás Akadémia: Pécsi — Maceiras, Arutyunyan, Stronati, Markgráf (Vékony (substituted on) 90') — Favorov, Plšek — Kerezsi (Nissilä (substituted on) 46'), Levi, Zs. Nagy (c) — Colley • Manager: Zsolt Hornyák; Player of the match: Jakub Plšek, Puskás Akadémia 7.8 (Source:)

22 February 2025 21	Puskás Akadémia	4–2	Kecskemét	Felcsút
14:30 CET	Nissilä 6'; Zs. Nagy 20'; Levi 30'; Colley (yellow card) 58'; Arutyunyan (yellow card) 61'; Favorov 90'	Report	Zsótér 48'; Belényesi (yellow card) 58'; Zeke 59'	Stadium: Pancho Aréna; Attendance: 1,042; Referee: József Erdős; Assistant referees: Georgiou Theodoros, Ákos Berényi
Note: Puskás Akadémia: Pécsi — Maceiras, Arutyunyan, Stronati, Markgráf (Soisalo (substituted on) 74') — Plšek, Favorov — Nissilä (Vékony (substituted on) 81'), Levi (Orján (substituted on) 90+3'), Zs. Nagy (c) — Colley (Fameyeh (substituted on) 81') • Manager: Zsolt Hornyák; Player of the match: Jonathan Levi, Puskás Akadémia 8.4 (Source:)

1 March 2025 22	Diósgyőr	2–1	Puskás Akadémia	Miskolc
17:00 CET	Požeg Vancaš 6'; Jurek (yellow card) 86' (goal) 89'	Report	Favorov 28'	Stadium: Diósgyőri Stadion; Attendance: 3,645; Referee: Balázs Berke; Assistant referees: Vencel Tóth II, Norbert Bornemissza
Note: Puskás Akadémia: Pécsi — Maceiras, Arutyunyan, Stronati, Markgráf (Kerezsi (substituted on) 76') — Favorov, Plšek — Levi, Nissilä (Duarte (substituted on) 76'), Zs. Nagy (c) — Colley (Fameyeh (substituted on) 76') • Manager: Zsolt Hornyák; Player of the match: Artem Favorov, Puskás Akadémia 8.0 (Source:)

9 March 2025 23	Újpest	1–1	Puskás Akadémia	Újpest
15:30 CET	Ganea (yellow card) 45'; Kr. Horváth (yellow card) 48'; Fiola (yellow card) 51'; Brodić 60'; Duarte (yellow card) 70'	Report	Colley 54'; Plšek (yellow card) 64'; Soisalo (yellow card) 90+4'	Stadium: Szusza Ferenc Stadion; Attendance: 3,807; Referee: Mihály Káprály; Assistant referees: István Albert, Péter Garai
Note: Puskás Akadémia: Pécsi — Maceiras, Arutyunyan, Stronati, Golla — Favorov, Plšek (Duarte (substituted on) 70') — Levi, Kerezsi (Soisalo (substituted on) 70'), Zs. Nagy (c) — Colley (Fameyeh (substituted on) 88') • Manager: Zsolt Hornyák; Player of the match: Jonathan Levi, Puskás Akadémia 8.1 (Source:)

16 March 2025 24	Puskás Akadémia	2–1	Zalaegerszeg	Felcsút
19:30 CET	Favorov (yellow card) 27'; Zs. Nagy 62' (yellow card) 89'; Colley 78' (yellow card) 79'; Duarte (yellow card) 90+4'	Report	Golla 12' (o.g.); B. Kiss (yellow card) 39' (yellow-red card) 90+2'; Csóka (yellow card) 51'	Stadium: Pancho Arena; Attendance: 1,629; Referee: Ádám Pillók; Assistant referees: Balázs Szalai, Dániel Szalai
Note: Puskás Akadémia: Pécsi — Maceiras, Golla, Stronati, Arutyunyan — Plšek (Duarte (substituted on) 46'), Favorov (Nissilä (substituted on) 46') — Kerezsi (Soisalo (substituted on) 46'), Levi (Mondovics (substituted on) 89'), Zs. Nagy (c) — Colley (Markgráf (substituted on) 85') • Manager: Zsolt Hornyák; Player of the match: Zsolt Nagy, Puskás Akadémia 8.4 (Source:)

29 March 2025 25	Nyíregyháza	0–2	Puskás Akadémia	Nyíregyháza
19:30 CEST	Alaxai (yellow card) 55'; Navrátil (yellow card) 87'	Report	Nissilä 5', 30'; Levi (yellow card) 54'	Stadium: Városi Stadion; Attendance: 4,034; Referee: Márton Rúsz; Assistant referees: István Szécsényi, Dániel Szalai
Note: Puskás Akadémia: Pécsi — Maceiras, Golla, Stronati, Arutyunyan — Duarte, Markgráf — Soisalo (Kerezsi (substituted on) 83'), Nissilä, Levi (Mondovics (substituted on) 87') — Plšek (c) • Manager: Zsolt Hornyák; Player of the match: Urho Nissilä, Puskás Akadémia 8.1 (Source:)

6 April 2025 26	Puskás Akadémia	1–1	MTK	Felcsút
16:30 CEST	Levi 42'; Arutyunyan (yellow card) 80'; Golla (yellow card) 85'	Report	R. Molnár 38'; Kádár (yellow card) 71'	Stadium: Pancho Arena; Attendance: 700; Referee: Mihály Káprály; Assistant referees: Balázs Szert, Ákos Berényi
Note: Puskás Akadémia: Pécsi — Maceiras (Kerezsi (substituted on) 74'), Golla, Stronati, Zs. Nagy (c) — Duarte, Arutyunyan — Soisalo, Nissilä (Favorov (substituted on) 74'), Levi (Vékony (substituted on) 90+2') — Plšek (Colley (substituted on) 63') • Manager: Zsolt Hornyák; Player of the match: Jonathan Levi, Puskás Akadémia 7.5 (Source:)

12 April 2025 27	Győr	2–0	Puskás Akadémia	Győr
14:15 CEST	Bumba (yellow card) 43'; Bánáti (yellow card) 70'; Štefulj (yellow card) 72'; Diarra 86'; Sahli 90+8'	Report	Colley (yellow card) 40'; Favorov (yellow card) 56'	Stadium: ETO Park; Attendance: 3,120; Referee: Imre Kovács; Assistant referees: Georgiou Theodoros, József Aradi
Note: Puskás Akadémia: Pécsi — Maceiras, Golla, Stronati, Arutyunyan — Duarte, Favorov (Mondovics (substituted on) 83') — Soisalo (Nissilä (substituted on) 71'), Levi, Zs. Nagy (c) — Colley (Plšek (substituted on) 66') • Manager: Zsolt Hornyák; Player of the match: Wajdi Sahli, Győr 8.1 • Best player of Puskás Akadémia: Jonathan Levi 7.6 (Source:)

19 April 2025 28	Paks	2–2	Puskás Akadémia	Paks
20:30 CEST	Lenzsér (yellow card) 12'; Böde 21' (pen.); K. Papp (yellow card) 56'; B. Tóth 73'; Ötvös (yellow card) 79'	Report	Favorov (yellow card) 8'; Zs. Nagy 32'; Fameyeh (yellow card) 80' (goal) 90+2'	Stadium: Fehérvári úti Stadion; Attendance: 4,101; Referee: Balázs Berke; Assistant referees: István Szécsényi, Ákos Berényi
Note: Puskás Akadémia: Pécsi — Maceiras, Golla, Stronati, Arutyunyan — Duarte, Levi (Vékony (substituted on) 88'), Favorov (Plšek (substituted on) 62') — Soisalo (Nissilä (substituted on) 84'), Colley (Fameyeh (substituted on) 62'), Zs. Nagy (c) • Manager: Zsolt Hornyák; Player of the match: Zsolt Nagy, Puskás Akadémia 8.2 (Source:)

26 April 2025 29	Puskás Akadémia	3–1	Fehérvár	Felcsút
15:15 CEST	Colley 27'; Zs. Nagy (yellow card) 41'; Levi 45+1'; Duarte 76'	Report	Spandler (yellow card) 11'; Simut (yellow card) 49'; Petrov (yellow card) 75'; Katona (yellow card) 90'; Kastrati 88' (yellow card) 90+1'	Stadium: Pancho Aréna; Attendance: 1,881; Referee: Gergő Bogár; Assistant referees: Gergő Vígh-Tarsonyi, Péter Ország
Note: Puskás Akadémia: Pécsi — Maceiras, Golla, Stronati, Favorov — Duarte (Orján (substituted on) 86'), Arutyunyan — Plšek (Nissilä (substituted on) 69'), Levi (Vékony (substituted on) 84'), Zs. Nagy (c) (Kerezsi (substituted on) 84') — Colley (Fameyeh (substituted on) 69') • Manager: Zsolt Hornyák; Player of the match: Jonathan Levi, Puskás Akadémia 9.0 (Source:)

3 May 2025 30	Ferencváros	1–1	Puskás Akadémia	Budapest
19:30 CEST	Cissé (yellow card) 36'; B. Varga 52'	Report	Szalai 42' (o.g.); Kerezsi (yellow card) 90+1'	Stadium: Ferencváros Stadion; Attendance: 19,021; Referee: Tamás Bognár; Assistant referees: Balázs Buzás, Péter Kóbor
Note: Puskás Akadémia: Pécsi — Maceiras, Golla, Stronati, Favorov (Plšek (substituted on) 68') — Arutyunyan, Duarte — Soisalo (Kerezsi (substituted on) 72'), Levi (Nissilä (substituted on) 84'), Zs. Nagy (c) — Colley (Fameyeh (substituted on) 84') • Manager: Zsolt Hornyák; Player of the match: Barnabás Varga, Ferencváros 8.0 • Best player of Puskás Akadémia: Ármin Pécsi 7.2 (Source:)

10 May 2025 31	Puskás Akadémia	4–2	Debrecen	Felcsút
14:30 CEST	Levi 10', 89'; Colley (yellow card) 18'; Zs. Nagy 37'; Duarte (yellow card) 52'; Mondovics (yellow card) 90+6' (goal) 90+8'	Report	Szűcs (yellow card) 45'; Hofmann (yellow card) 51'; M. Szécsi (yellow card) 66'; Youga 78'; Kaye 90'; Dzsudzsák (yellow card) 90'	Stadium: Pancho Aréna; Attendance: 2,523; Referee: Péter Antal; Assistant referees: Vencel Tóth II, Gergő Vígh-Tarsonyi
Note: Puskás Akadémia: Pécsi — Maceiras, Golla, Stronati, Markgráf — Duarte (Plšek (substituted on) 75'), Arutyunyan — Soisalo (Vékony (substituted on) 75'), Levi (Mondovics (substituted on) 90+3'), Zs. Nagy (c) (Nissilä (substituted on) 77') — Colley (Fameyeh (substituted on) 75') • Manager: Zsolt Hornyák; Player of the match: Jonathan Levi, Puskás Akadémia 8.8 (Source:)

16 May 2025 32	Kecskemét	0–1	Puskás Akadémia	Kecskemét
18:15 CEST	Bocskay (yellow card) 41'	Report	Colley (yellow card) 50'; Nissilä (yellow card) 66'; Plšek 84'	Stadium: Széktói Stadion; Attendance: 1,852; Referee: Tamás Bognár; Assistant referees: Ákos Berényi, Péter Ország
Note: Puskás Akadémia: Pécsi — Maceiras, Golla, Stronati, Markgráf — Nissilä (Plšek (substituted on) 70'), Duarte — Soisalo (Vékony (substituted on) 78'), Levi, Zs. Nagy (c) — Colley (Fameyeh (substituted on) 60') • Manager: Zsolt Hornyák; Player of the match: Jonathan Levi, Puskás Akadémia 8.6 (Source:)

24 May 2025 33	Puskás Akadémia	4–3	Diósgyőr	Felcsút
20:00 CEST	Levi 22', 72'; Duarte (yellow card) 36'; Plšek 89', 90+3'	Report	Rakonjac (yellow card) 19'; Demeter (yellow card) 15' (yellow-red card) 27'; Acolatse 42'; D. Gera 51'; Skribek 81'; Sentić (yellow card) 90+2'	Stadium: Pancho Aréna; Attendance: 2,385; Referee: Csaba Pintér; Assistant referees: Balázs Huszár, Dániel Szalai
Note: Puskás Akadémia: Pécsi — Maceiras (Modovics (substituted on) 90+3'), Golla, Stronati, Markgráf (Kerezsi (substituted on) 66') — Arutyunyan (Fameyeh (substituted on) 58'), Duarte — Soisalo (Plšek (substituted on) 58'), Levi, Zs. Nagy (c) — Colley (Nissilä (substituted on) 58') • Manager: Zsolt Hornyák; Player of the match: Jonathan Levi, Puskás Akadémia 10.0 (Source:)

==== Results overview ====
All results are indicated from the perspective of Puskás Akadémia FC.
We indicate in parentheses the number of round.
Win Draw Loss Postponed

Opposition	Round 1–22		Round 23–33		Double	Points
Opposition	Home score	Away score	Home score	Away score	Double	Points
Debrecen	1–0 (9)	2–1 (20)	4–2 (31)		7–3	9
Diósgyőr	1–1 (11)	1–2 (22)	4–3 (33)		6–6	4
Fehérvár	3–0 (7)	0–1 (18)	3–1 (29)		6–2	6
Ferencváros	1–0 (19)	0–3 (8)		1–1 (30)	2–4	4
Győr	0–3 (16)	2–0 (5)		0–2 (27)	2–5	3
Kecskemét	4–2 (21)	3–0 (10)		1–0 (32)	8–2	9
MTK	1–0 (4)	1–0 (15)	1–1 (26)		3–1	7
Nyíregyháza	3–1 (3)	3–0 (14)		2–0 (25)	8–1	9
Paks	3–1 (17)	1–2 (6)		2–2 (28)	6–5	4
Újpest	1–1 (12)	2–1 (1)		1–1 (23)	4–3	5
Zalaegerszeg	2–1 (2)	2–4 (13)	2–1 (24)		6–6	6

=== Magyar Kupa ===
==== Round of 64 ====
The draw for the Round of 64 was held on 26 August 2024. In the draw Puskás Akadémia got Szombathelyi MÁV Haladás II as their opponent, who play in MB 1. In the First round Haladás defeated Nyergesújfalu 3–0 at away. In the Second round Haladás matched Koroncó at away and defeated 4–2.

15 September 2024 R64	Szombathelyi MÁV Haladás II (MB I)	0–7	Puskás Akadémia	Szombathely
18:30 CEST	A. Horváth (yellow card) 34'	Report	Golla 4'; Puljić 12'; Plšek (yellow card) 31' (goal) 50'; Kerezsi 63'; Nissilä 70', 83'; Mondovics 75'	Stadium: Haladás Sportkomplexum; Attendance: 695; Referee: Bence Csonka; Assistant referees: Balázs Szalai, Dániel Szalai
Note: PAFC: Pécsi — Maceiras, Golla, Szolnoki (c), Ormonde-Ottewill (Vitályos (substituted on) 78') – Duarte, Plšek (Nissilä (substituted on) 55') – Levi (Mondovics (substituted on) 69'), D. Kocsis (Soisalo (substituted on) 55'), Kerezsi – Puljić (Colley (substituted on) 69') • Coach: Zsolt Hornyák

==== Round of 32 ====
The draw for the Round of 64 was held on 16 September 2024. In the draw Puskás Akadémia got Tatabánya as their opponent, who play in NB II. Tatabánya also started the Magyar Kupa competitions in Round of 64, they matched Újpalota (MB I) away and the result was 2–0.

30 October 2024 R32	Tatabánya (NB II)	2–3	Puskás Akadémia	Tatabánya
18:00 CET	Vida 3'; K. Katona (yellow card) 31'; Árvai 59'; Deutsch (yellow card) 70'; Forró (red card) 90+7' (On the bench)	Report	Plšek 17'; Puljić 20'; Maceiras (yellow card) 46'; Nissilä (yellow card) 76'; Vékony 86'; Colley (yellow card) 90+2'	Stadium: Stadion Gyula Grosics; Attendance: 800; Referee: Márió Zimmermann; Assistant referees: Zoltán Horváth, Levente Balla
Note: Puskás Akadémia: Markek — Maceiras, Golla, Szolnoki (c), Zs. Nagy — Plšek, Nissilä (Stronati (substituted on) 90') — Soisalo (Vékony (substituted on) 46'), Mondovics (Favorov (substituted on) 46'), Kerezsi (Duarte (substituted on) 71') — Puljić (Colley (substituted on) 71') • Coach: Zsolt Hornyák

==== Round of 16 ====
The draw for the Round of 32 was held on 31 October 2024. In the draw Puskás Akadémia got Nyíregyháza Spartacus FC as their opponent, who play in NB I. In the Round of 64 Nyíregyháza matched Vasas (NB II) away and the result was 1–1 after extra time. Nyíregyháza advanced to the next round with penalties 7–6. In the Round of 32 Nyíregyháza matched Ajka (NB II) away and the result was 3–3 after extra time. Nyíregyháza advanced to the next round with penalties 4–2.

25 February 2025 R16	Nyíregyháza (NB I)	1–0	Puskás Akadémia	Nyíregyháza
20:00 CET	Jokić 13' (yellow card) 81'; Babić (yellow card) 58'; Radosević (yellow card) 65'; Benczenleitner (yellow card) 90+2'	Report	Vékony (yellow card) 27'	Stadium: Városi Stadion; Attendance: 2,852; Referee: Gergő Bogár; Assistant referees: Balázs Szalai, Bence Belicza
Note: Puskás Akadémia: Pécsi — Maceiras, Arutyunyan, Golla, Markgráf (Stronati (substituted on) 71') — Favorov (Kerezsi (substituted on) 81'), Nissilä (Plšek (substituted on) 46'), Vékony (Soisalo (substituted on) 63') — Levi, Colley (Fameyeh (substituted on) 63'), Zs. Nagy (c) • Manager: Zsolt Hornyák

=== UEFA Conference League ===
==== Second qualifying round ====
The draw was held on 19 June 2024.

25 July 2024 First leg	SC Dnipro-1 (Ukraine)	0–3 w/o (Note: Dnipro-1 forfeited its two matches due to bankruptcy.)	Puskás Akadémia
		Report

1 August 2024 Second leg	Puskás Akadémia	3–0 w/o (6–0 agg.)	(Ukraine) SC Dnipro-1
		Report

==== Third qualifying round ====
The draw was held on 22 July 2024.

8 August 2024 First leg	Ararat-Armenia	0–1	Puskás Akadémia	Yerevan, Armenia
17:00 (19:00 AMT)	Grigorjan (yellow card) 17'; Yenne (yellow card) 28'	Report	Szolnoki (yellow card) 15'; Ormonde-Ottewill (yellow card) 81'; Zs. Nagy (yellow card) 87'; Soisalo 89'	Stadium: Yerevan Football Academy Stadium; Attendance: 3,506; Referee: Kristoffer Hagenes (Netherlands); Assistant referees: Øystein Ytterland, Tom Harald Grønevik
Note: Puskás Akadémia: Pécsi — Maceiras, Golla, Stronati, Ormonde-Ottewill — Szolnoki (c) (Favorov (substituted on) 63'), Plšek — Soisalo, Nissilä (Levi (substituted on) 78'), Zs. Nagy — Colley (Puljić (substituted on) 87') • Coach: Zsolt Hornyák

15 August 2024 Second leg	Puskás Akadémia	3–3 (4–3 agg.)	Ararat-Armenia	Felcsút
21:00 CEST	Zs. Nagy 8', 47'; Szolnoki (yellow card) 62'; Komáromi (yellow card) 89'; Favorov 90+4' (yellow card) 90+5'	Report	Ambartsumyan (yellow card) 20'; A. Rodríguez (yellow card) 30'; Serobyan 39'; Harutyunyan 43'; Nondi (red card) 62'; Duarte 85' (yellow card) 87'	Stadium: Pancho Aréna; Attendance: 1,280; Referee: Genc Nuza (Kosovo); Assistant referees: Fatlum Berisha, Bujar Selimaj
Note: Puskás Akadémia: Pécsi — Maceiras, Golla, Stronati, Ormonde-Ottewill — Szolnoki (c) (Levi (substituted on) 64'), Plšek (Favorov (substituted on) 83') — Soisalo (Komáromi (substituted on) 54'), Nissilä, Zs. Nagy — Colley (Puljić (substituted on) 46') • Coach: Zsolt Hornyák

Puskás Akadémia won 4–3 on aggregate.

==== Play-off round ====
The draw for the play-off round was held on 5 August 2024.

22 August 2024 First leg	Fiorentina (Italy)	3–3	Puskás Akadémia	Florence, Italy
20:00 CEST	Quarta (yellow card) 17'; Sottil 45+3'; Martínez Quarta 67'; Peluso (yellow card) 72'; Kean 75'; Pongračić (yellow card) 85'; Biraghi (yellow card) 90'	Report	Zs. Nagy 9' (pen.) (yellow card) 56'; Soisalo 12'; Golla 89'	Stadium: Stadio Artemio Franchi; Attendance: 12,091; Referee: Willy Delajod (France); Assistant referees: Erwan Finjean, Philippe Jeanne
Note: Puskás Akadémia: Pécsi — Maceiras, Golla, Stronati, Ormonde-Ottewill (Komáromi (substituted on) 46') — Favorov (Szolnoki (substituted on) 82'), Plšek — Soisalo (Levi (substituted on) 74'), Nissilä, Zs. Nagy (c) — Puljić (Colley (substituted on) 82') • Coach: Zsolt Hornyák

29 August 2024 Second leg	Puskás Akadémia	1–1 (a.e.t.) (4–4 agg.) (2–3 p)	(Italy) Fiorentina	Felcsút
21:00 CEST	Plšek (yellow card) 52'; Colley (yellow card) 79'; Komáromi (yellow card) 81'; Favorov (yellow card) 90+2'; Maceiras (yellow card) 90+3'; Zs. Nagy 90+7' (pen.)	Report	Pongračić (yellow card) 8'; Kean (yellow card) 44' (goal) 59'; Comuzzo (yellow card) 75' (yellow-red card) 97'; Ranieri (yellow card) 78' (yellow-red card) 90+4'; Quarta (red card) 90+7' (On the bench); Dodô (yellow card) 90+8'	Stadium: Pancho Aréna; Attendance: 3,528; Referee: António Nobre (Portugal); Assistant referees: Pedro Ribeiro, Nelson Pereira
	Penalties
	Komáromi (penalty scored); Favorov (penalty scored); Golla (penalty scored); Szolnoki (penalty missed); Zs. Nagy (penalty scored)		(penalty scored) Mandragora; (penalty scored) Kouamé; (penalty scored) Colpani; (penalty scored) Richardson; (penalty scored) Biraghi
Note: Puskás Akadémia: Pécsi — Maceiras, Golla, Stronati, Zs. Nagy (c) — Plšek (Szolnoki (substituted on) 79'), Favorov, Nissilä — Soisalo (Vékony (substituted on) 88'), Puljić (Komáromi (substituted on) 67'), Levi (Colley (substituted on) 67') • Coach: Hornyák (yellow card)

1–1 on aggregate, Fiorentina won 5–4 on penalties.

== Squad statistics ==
As of match played 9 November 2024

Keys
Rk.	Rank	No.	Squad number	Pos.	Position
Opponent	The opponent team without a flag is Hungarian.			(N)	The game was played at a neutral site.
(H)	Puskás Akadémia FC were the home team.			(A)	Puskás Akadémia FC were the away team.
Player	Young Hungarian Player, who is a Hungarian player and was born 2004 or after				
Player^{*}	Player who joined Puskás Akadémia FC on loan during the season				
Player^{⊕}	Player who joined Puskás Akadémia FC permanently during the season				
Player^{†}	Player who departed Puskás Akadémia FC permanently or on loan during the season				

=== Appearances ===
Includes all competitions for senior teams.
We indicate the number of the player's appearances as substitute by the combination of a plus sign and a figure.
We indicate with gold color the maximum appearances only in the competition in which the team has already played at least 2 matches.

No.	Pos.	Nat.	Player	Nemzeti Bajnokság I	Magyar Kupa	Conference League	Season total	Ref.
Goalkeepers
24	GK	(Hungary)	Tamás Markek	3	1	0	4	
72	GK	(Hungary)	Bendegúz Lehoczki	0	0	0	0	
91	GK	(Hungary)	Ármin Pécsi	9	1	4	14	
Defenders
14	DF	(Poland)	Wojciech Golla	12	2	4	18	
17	DF	(Czech Republic)	Patrizio Stronati	12	0+1	4	16+1	
21	DF	(Armenia)	Georgy Arutyunyan^{⊕}	0	0	0	0	
22	DF	(Hungary)	Roland Szolnoki (c)	7+2	2	2+2	11+4	
23	DF	(Switzerland)	Quentin Maceiras	12	2	4	18	
25	DF	(Hungary)	Zsolt Nagy	12	1	4	17	
33	DF	(England)	Brandon Ormonde-Ottewill	3+2	1	3	7+2	
55	DF	(Hungary)	Viktor Vitályos	0	0+1	0	0+1	
66	DF	(Hungary)	Ákos Markgráf	3+1	0	0	3+1	
76	DF	(Hungary)	Barna Pál	0	0	0	0	
Midfielders
6	MF	(Cape Verde)	Laros Duarte	5+3	1+1	0	6+4	
8	MF	(Hungary)	Dominik Kocsis	0	1	0	1	
11	MF	(Ukraine)	Artem Tyshchuk	0	0	0	0	
15	MF	(Czech Republic)	Jakub Plšek	6+5	2	4	12+5	
16	MF	(Finland)	Urho Nissilä	11+1	1+1	4	16+2	
19	MF	(Ukraine)	Artem Favorov	7+3	0+1	2+2	9+6	
88	MF	(Hungary)	Bence Vékony	0+3	0+1	0+1	0+5	
Forwards
7	FW	(Ghana)	Joel Fameyeh^{⊕}	0	0	0	0	
9	FW	(The Gambia)	Lamin Colley	8+3	0+2	2+2	10+7	
10	FW	(Sweden)	Jonathan Levi	7+4	1	1+3	9+7	
20	FW	(Finland)	Mikael Soisalo	9+3	1+1	4	14+4	
21	FW	(Croatia)	Jakov Puljić	3+7	2	2+2	7+9	
77	FW	(Hungary)	Kevin Mondovics	0+2	1+1	0	1+3	
99	FW	(Hungary)	Zalán Kerezsi^{*}	0+7	2	0	2+7	
Players who departed the club on loan but featured this season
Players who left the club during the season
(7)	FW	(Hungary)	György Komáromi^{†}	3+2	0	0+3	3+5	
(31)	DF	(Hungary)	Zsombor Bévárdi^{†}	0	0	0	0	

Notes: GK: goalkeeper; DF: defender; MF: midfielder; FW: forward

=== Goal scorers ===
Includes all competitions for senior teams. The list is sorted by squad number when season-total goals are equal. Players with no goals not included in the list.
We indicate in parentheses how many of the goals scored by the player from penalties.

Rk.	No.	Pos.	Nat.	Player	Nemzeti Bajnokság I	Magyar Kupa	Conference League	Season total
1	25	DF	(Hungary)	Zsolt Nagy	10 (5)	0	4 (2)	14 (7)
2	9	FW	(The Gambia)	Lamin Colley	9	0	0	9
3	15	MF	(Czech Republic)	Jakub Plšek	4 (1)	2	0	6 (1)
4	10	FW	(Sweden)	Jonathan Levi	5	0	0	5
4	16	MF	(Finland)	Urho Nissilä	3	2	0	5
5	14	DF	(Poland)	Wojciech Golla	2	1	1	4
5	19	MF	(Ukraine)	Artem Favorov	3	0	1	4
6	21	FW	(Croatia)	Jakov Puljić	1	2 (1)	0	3 (1)
7	(7)	FW	(Hungary)	György Komáromi^{†}	2	0	0	2
7	20	FW	(Finland)	Mikael Soisalo	0	0	2	2
8	17	DF	(Czech Republic)	Patrizio Stronati	1	0	0	1
8	77	FW	(Hungary)	Kevin Mondovics	0	1	0	1
8	88	MF	(Hungary)	Bence Vékony	0	1	0	1
8	99	FW	(Hungary)	Zalán Kerezsi^{*}	0	1	0	1
				Opponent Own goal	0	0	0	0
Total					40 (6)	10 (1)	8 (2)	58 (9)

=== Penalties ===
Date	Penalty Taker	Scored	Opponent	Competitio
11 August 2024	(Czech Republic) Jakub Plšek	Yes	Nyíregyháza (H)	Nemzeti Bajnokság I, Round 3
22 August 2024	(Hungary) Zsolt Nagy	Yes	Fiorentina (Italy) (A)	UEFA Conference League, Play-off round
29 August 2024	(Hungary) Zsolt Nagy	Yes	Fiorentina (Italy) (H)	UEFA Conference League, Play-off round
20 October 2024	(Hungary) Zsolt Nagy	Yes	Kecskemét (A)	Nemzeti Bajnokság I, Round 10
30 October 2024	(Croatia) Jakov Puljić	Yes	Tatabánya (A)	Magyar Kupa, Round of 32
23 November 2024	(Hungary) Zsolt Nagy	Yes	Nyíregyháza (A)	Nemzeti Bajnokság I, Round 14
30 November 2024	(Hungary) Zsolt Nagy	Yes	MTK (A)	Nemzeti Bajnokság I, Round 15
14 December 2024	(Hungary) Zsolt Nagy	Yes	Paks (H)	Nemzeti Bajnokság I, Round 17
15 February 2025	(Hungary) Zsolt Nagy	Yes	Debrecen (A)	Nemzeti Bajnokság I, Round 20

=== Own goals ===
Pos.	Nat.	Player	Minute	Score	Result	Opponent	Competition	Date
DF	(Poland)	Wojciech Golla	12	0–1	2–1	Zalaegerszeg (H)	Nemzeti Bajnokság I, Round 24	16 March 2025

=== Assists ===
Includes all competitions for senior teams. The list is sorted by squad number when season-total assists are equal. Players with no assists not included in the list.

Rk.	No.	Pos.	Nat.	Player	Nemzeti Bajnokság I	Magyar Kupa	Conference League	Season total
1	16	MF	(Finland)	Urho Nissilä	3	0	1	4
1	20	FW	(Finland)	Mikael Soisalo	3	0	1	4
2	10	FW	(Sweden)	Jonathan Levi	2	0	1	3
2	25	DF	(Hungary)	Zsolt Nagy	3	0	0	3
3	(7)	FW	(Hungary)	György Komáromi^{†}	1	0	0	1
3	14	DF	(Poland)	Wojciech Golla	1	0	0	1
3	19	MF	(Ukraine)	Artem Favorov	1	0	0	1
3	21	FW	(Croatia)	Jakov Puljić	0	0	1	1
Total					14	0	4	18

=== Goalkeepers ===
==== Clean sheets ====
Includes all competitions for senior teams. The list is sorted by squad number when season-total clean sheets are equal. Numbers in parentheses represent games where both goalkeepers participated and both kept a clean sheet; the number in parentheses is awarded to the goalkeeper who was substituted on, whilst a full clean sheet is awarded to the goalkeeper who was on the field at the start of play.

						Clean sheets				
Rk.	No.	Nat.	Goalkeeper	Games Played	Goals Against	Goals Against Average	Nemzeti Bajnokság I	Magyar Kupa	Conference League	Season total
1	91	(Hungary)	Ármin Pécsi	27	31	1.15	7	1	1	9
2	24	(Hungary)	Tamás Markek	4	5	1.25	1	0	0	1
Total					20		8	1	1	10

==== Penalties saving ====
Date	Goalkeeper	Penalty Kick Save	Penalty Taker	Opponent	Competition	Min	Rem
1 September 2024	(Hungary) Tamás Markek	No	(Hungary) József Windecker	Paks (A)	Nemzeti Bajnokság I, Round 6	(penalty scored) 57'	
2 November 2024	(Hungary) Ármin Pécsi	Yes	(Croatia) Fran Brodić	Újpest (H)	Nemzeti Bajnokság I, Round 12	(penalty missed) 21'	
10 May 2025	(Hungary) Ármin Pécsi	Yes	(France) Brandon Domingues	Debrecen (H)	Nemzeti Bajnokság I, Round 31	(penalty missed) 15'	

=== Disciplinary record ===
Includes all competitions for senior teams. The list is sorted by red cards, then yellow cards (and by squad number when total cards are equal). Players with no cards not included in the list.

Rk.	No.	Pos.	Nat.	Player	Nemzeti Bajnokság I				Magyar Kupa				Conference League				Season total			
Rk.	No.	Pos.	Nat.	Player	Yellow card	Second yellow card	Red card	MM	Yellow card	Second yellow card	Red card	MM	Yellow card	Second yellow card	Red card	MM	Yellow card	Second yellow card	Red card	MM
1	14	DF	(Poland)	Wojciech Golla	5	1	0	2	0	0	0	0	0	0	0	0	5	1	0	2
2	9	FW	(The Gambia)	Lamin Colley	10	0	0	2	1	0	0	0	0	0	0	0	11	0	0	2
3	23	DF	(Switzerland)	Quentin Maceiras	7	0	0	1	1	0	0	0	0	0	0	0	8	0	0	1
4	25	DF	(Hungary)	Zsolt Nagy	5	0	0	1	0	0	0	0	2	0	0	0	7	0	0	1
5	19	MF	(Ukraine)	Artem Favorov	5	0	0	1	0	0	0	0	1	0	0	0	6	0	0	1
5	22	DF	(Hungary)	Roland Szolnoki	4	0	0	0	0	0	0	0	2	0	0	0	6	0	0	0
6	15	MF	(Czech Republic)	Jakub Plšek	3	0	0	0	1	0	0	0	0	0	0	0	4	0	0	0
7	16	MF	(Finland)	Urho Nissilä	2	0	0	0	1	0	0	0	0	0	0	0	3	0	0	0
7	66	DF	(Hungary)	Ákos Markgráf	3	0	0	0	0	0	0	0	0	0	0	0	3	0	0	0
8	6	MF	(Cape Verde)	Laros Duarte	2	0	0	0	0	0	0	0	0	0	0	0	2	0	0	0
8	17	DF	(Czech Republic)	Patrizio Stronati	2	0	0	0	0	0	0	0	0	0	0	0	2	0	0	0
8	33	DF	(England)	Brandon Ormonde-Ottewill	1	0	0	0	0	0	0	0	1	0	0	0	2	0	0	0
9	(7)	FW	(Hungary)	György Komáromi^{†}	0	0	0	0	0	0	0	0	1	0	0	0	1	0	0	0
9	10	FW	(Sweden)	Jonathan Levi	1	0	0	0	0	0	0	0	0	0	0	0	1	0	0	0
9	20	FW	(Finland)	Mikael Soisalo	1	0	0	0	0	0	0	0	0	0	0	0	1	0	0	0
9	21	DF	(Armenia)	Georgy Arutyunyan	1	0	0	0	0	0	0	0	0	0	0	0	1	0	0	0
9	91	GK	(Hungary)	Ármin Pécsi	1	0	0	0	0	0	0	0	0	0	0	0	1	0	0	0
9	99	FW	(Hungary)	Zalán Kerezsi	1	0	0	0	0	0	0	0	0	0	0	0	1	0	0	0
Total					54	1	0	7	4	0	0	0	7	0	0	0	65	1	0	7

=== Suspensions ===
Player	Date Received	Opponent	Competition	Length of suspension			
(The Gambia) Lamin Colley	2 November 2024	5th (yellow card) after Újpest (H)	NB I, Round 12	1 Match	Zalaegerszeg (A)	NB I, Round 13	9 November 2024
(Switzerland) Quentin Maceiras	9 November 2024	5th (yellow card) after Zalaegerszeg (A)	NB I, Round 13	1 Match	Nyíregyháza (A)	NB I, Round 14	23 November 2024
(Poland) Wojciech Golla	7 December 2024	(red card) 72' vs Győr (H)	NB I, Round 16	1 Match	Paks (H)	NB I, Round 17	14 December 2024
(Poland) Wojciech Golla	1 February 2025	5th (yellow card) after Fehérvár (A)	NB I, Round 18	1 Match	Ferencváros (H)	NB I, Round 19	9 February 2025
(Hungary) Zsolt Nagy	16 March 2025	5th (yellow card) after Zalaegerszeg (H)	NB I, Round 24	1 Match	Nyíregyháza (A)	NB I, Round 25	29 March 2025
(The Gambia) Lamin Colley	16 March 2025	5th (yellow card) after Zalaegerszeg (H)	NB I, Round 24	1 Match	Nyíregyháza (A)	NB I, Round 25	29 March 2025
(Ukraine) Artem Favorov	16 March 2025	5th (yellow card) after Zalaegerszeg (H)	NB I, Round 24	1 Match	Nyíregyháza (A)	NB I, Round 25	29 March 2025

=== Injury ===
Player	Date	Offence	Competition	Ref.

=== Captains ===
Includes all competitions for senior teams. The list is sorted by squad number when season-total number of games where a player started as captain are equal. Players with no games started as captain not included in the list.

Rk.	No.	Pos.	Nat.	Player	Nemzeti Bajnokság I	Magyar Kupa	Conference League	Season total
1	25	MF	(Hungary)	Zsolt Nagy	18	1	2	21
2	22	DF	(Hungary)	Roland Szolnoki	13	2	2	17
3	15	MF	(Czech Republic)	Jakub Plšek	1	0	0	1
Total					32	3	4	39

== Attendances ==
The table contains the number of attendances of Puskás Akadémia domestic matches.
Clicking on the competitions leads to the number of spectators for all the matches of the competitions.
The gold indicates the highest attendances, and the lowest attendances with pink .
Home stadium: Pancho Aréna, Felcsút • Capacity: 3,865

League	Matches	Attendances	Average		High		Low	
League	Matches	Attendances	Att.	%	Att.	%	Att.	%
Nemzeti Bajnokság I	16	26,254	1,641	42.4%	3,821	98.8%	700	18.1%
Magyar Kupa	—	—	—	—	—	—	—	—
UEFA Conference League	2	4,808	2,404	62.2%	3,528	91.3%	1,280	33.1%
Total	18	31,062	1,726	44.6%	3,821	98.8%	700	18.1%

Nemzeti Bajnokság I
Round	Date	Opponent	Attendances	%	Ref.
Round 2	4 August 2024	Zalaegerszeg	1,321	34.2%	
Round 3	11 August 2024	Nyíregyháza	921	23.8%	
Round 4	18 August 2024	MTK Budapest	1,218	31.5%	
Round 7	22 September 2024	Fehérvár	2,058	53.2%	
Round 9	4 October 2024	Debrecen	1,195	28.9%	
Round 11	26 October 2024	Diósgyőr	1,422	36.8%	
Round 12	2 November 2024	Újpest	2,320	60.0%	
Round 16	7 December 2024	Győr	1,036	26.8%	
Round 17	14 December 2024	Paks	782	20.2%	
Round 19	9 February 2025	Ferencváros	3,821	98.8%	
Round 21	22 February 2025	Kecskemét	1,042	26.9%	
Round 24	16 March 2025	Zalaegerszeg	1,629	42.1%	
Round 26	6 April 2025	MTK Budapest	700	18.1%	
Round 29	26 April 2025	Fehérvár	1,881	48.6%	
Round 31	10 May 2025	Debrecen	2,523	64.7%	
Round 33	24 May 2025	Diósgyőr	2,385	61.7%	
Total			26,254	—	
Average			1,641	42.4%	

Magyar Kupa
Round	Date	Opponent	Attendances	%	Ref.
Total			0	—	
Average			0		

UEFA Conference League
Round	Date	Opponent	Attendances	%	Ref.
Third qualifying round	15 August 2024	Ararat-Armenia	1,280	33.1%	
Play-off round	29 August 2024	Fiorentina	3,528	91.3%	
Total			4,808	—	
Average			2,404	62.2%	

== Awards and nominations ==
Keys
M	Matches	W	Won	D	Drawn	L	Lost
Pts	Points	GF	Goals for	GA	Goals against	GD	Goal difference
Pos.	Position	Pld	Played	G	Goals	A	Assists
(H)	Puskás Akadémia FC were the home team.			(A)	Puskás Akadémia FC were the away team.		
Player	Young Hungarian Player, who is a Hungarian player and was born 2004 or after						
Player^{*}	Player who joined Puskás Akadémia FC permanently or on loan during the season						
Player^{†}	Player who departed Puskás Akadémia FC permanently or on loan during the season						

=== Weekly awards ===
==== Player of the Round ====
Selection of the Round of Nemzeti Bajnokság by M4 Sport TV, Nemzeti Sport, Csakfoci and Sofascore websites and Player of the Week (POW) by Nemzeti Sport.

Round	Opponent	Pos.	Player	Selection of the Round				POW	Ref.
Round	Opponent	Pos.	Player	Nemzeti Sport	M4 Sport TV	Csakfoci	Sofascore	POW	Ref.
Round 1	Újpest (A)	DF	(Poland) Wojciech Golla			Yes			
Round 1	Újpest (A)	MF	(Finland) Urho Nissilä			Yes			
Round 1	Újpest (A)	FW	(The Gambia) Lamin Colley			Yes			
Round 2	Zalaegerszeg (H)	MF	(Hungary) Zsolt Nagy			Yes			
Round 3	Nyíregyháza (H)	MF	(Hungary) Zsolt Nagy			Yes			
Round 4	MTK Budapest (H)	GK	(Hungary) Tamás Markek			Yes			
Round 4	MTK Budapest (H)	DF	(Ukraine) Artem Favorov			Yes			
Round 4	MTK Budapest (H)	FW	(Sweden) Jonathan Levi			Yes			
Round 7	Fehérvár (H)	GK	(Hungary) Ármin Pécsi		Yes				
Round 7	Fehérvár (H)	DF	(Poland) Wojciech Golla		Yes	Yes			
Round 7	Fehérvár (H)	MF	(Finland) Urho Nissilä		Yes	Yes			
Round 7	Fehérvár (H)	FW	(Finland) Mikael Soisalo		Yes				
Round 9	Debrecen (H)	DF	(Poland) Wojciech Golla		Yes				
Round 10	Kecskemét (A)	GK	(Hungary) Ármin Pécsi			Yes			
Round 10	Kecskemét (A)	MF	(Hungary) Zsolt Nagy			Yes			
Round 10	Kecskemét (A)	MF	(Finland) Urho Nissilä		Yes	Yes			
Round 10	Kecskemét (A)	MF	(Ukraine) Artem Favorov		Yes				
Round 11	Diósgyőr (H)	DF	(Poland) Wojciech Golla			Yes			
Round 12	Újpest (H)	GK	(Hungary) Ármin Pécsi		Yes				
Round 14	Nyíregyháza (A)	MF	(Hungary) Zsolt Nagy			Yes			
Round 14	Nyíregyháza (A)	FW	(Sweden) Jonathan Levi			Yes			
Round 15	Győr (A)	MF	(Hungary) Zsolt Nagy			Yes			
Round 15	Győr (A)	FW	(Finland) Mikael Soisalo			Yes			
Round 17	Paks (H)	DF	(Hungary) Ákos Markgráf			Yes			
Round 17	Paks (H)	MF	(Hungary) Zsolt Nagy			Yes			
Round 19	Ferencváros (H)	GK	(Hungary) Ármin Pécsi		Yes	Yes			
Round 19	Ferencváros (H)	DF	(Hungary) Ákos Markgráf			Yes			
Round 19	Ferencváros (H)	MF	(Hungary) Zsolt Nagy		Yes	Yes			
Round 20	Debrecen (A)	MF	(Czech Republic) Jakub Plšek		Yes	Yes			
Round 21	Kecskemét (H)	MF	(Hungary) Zsolt Nagy		Yes	Yes	Yes		
Round 21	Kecskemét (H)	MF	(Sweden) Jonathan Levi		Yes		Yes		
Round 21	Kecskemét (H)	MF	(Finland) Urho Nissilä			Yes			
Round 22	Diósgyőr (A)	MF	(Ukraine) Artem Favorov				Yes		
Round 23	Újpest (A)	MF	(Sweden) Jonathan Levi		Yes		Yes		
Round 24	Zalaegerszeg (H)	MF	(Hungary) Zsolt Nagy		Yes	Yes	Yes		

(s) Substitute

==== Goal of the Round ====
Goal of the Round of Nemzeti Bajnokság by the M4 Sport website.

Keys

- Score – The score at the time of the goal. Puskás Akadémia FC's score listed first.
- Final score – The score at full time; Puskás Akadémia FC's listed first.

Round	Pos.	Player	Placement	Score	Final score	Opponent	Date	Ref.

=== Yearly awards ===
==== Rangadó Award Ceremony (Rangadó Gála) ====
Award	Manager or Player	Result	Ref.
2025 Player of the Year	(Hungary) Zsolt Nagy	Won	

==== HLSZ Cup ====
Award	Manager or Player	Result	Ref.
2024 Best U21 Player of the Year	(Hungary) Zsombor Gruber	Nominated	

==== Best U21 Players Worldwide ====
This report presents the players from 65 leagues born in 2004 or later who performed the best during the ongoing season or the one just completed for leagues organised over the calendar year. The rankings were established according to a performance index on a 100-basis considering players’ activity in six areas of the game: ground defence, aerial play, distribution, chance creation, take on and finishing. Goalkeepers and centre forwards were divided into two categories, centre backs int three, full/wing backs and wingers into four, and midfielders into five. Scouting report by CIES Football Observatory.

Category	#	Player	Score
Short-passes Goalkeepers	4th	(Hungary) Ármin Pécsi	67.6

== Milestones ==
Keys
Final score	The score at full time; Puskás Akadémia FC's listed first.	No.	Squad number	Pos.	Position
Opponent	The opponent team without a flag is Hungarian.	(N)	The game was played at a neutral site.		
(H)	Puskás Akadémia FC were the home team.	(A)	Puskás Akadémia FC were the away team.		
Player^{*}	Player who joined Puskás Akadémia FC permanently or on loan during the season				
Player^{†}	Player who departed Puskás Akadémia FC permanently or on loan during the season				

Debuts

The following players made their competitive debuts for Puskás Akadémia FC's first team during the campaign.

Date	No.	Pos.	Player	Age	Final score	Opponent	Competition	Ref.
1 September 2024	6	MF	(Cape Verde) Laros Duarte	27	1–2	Paks (A)	Nemzeti Bajnokság	
1 September 2024	99	FW	(Hungary) Zalán Kerezsi^{*}	21	1–2	Paks (A)	Nemzeti Bajnokság	
15 September 2024	8	MF	(Hungary) Dominik Kocsis	20	7–0	Szombathelyi MÁV Haladás II (A)	Magyar Kupa	
15 September 2024	55	DF	(Hungary) Viktor Vitályos	17	7–0	Szombathelyi MÁV Haladás II (A)	Magyar Kupa	
1 February 2025	7	FW	(Ghana) Joel Fameyeh	27	0–1	Fehérvár (A)	Nemzeti Bajnokság	

50th appearances

The following players made their 50th appearances for Puskás Akadémia FC's first team during the campaign.

Date	No.	Pos.	Player	Age	Final score	Opponent	Competition	Ref.
22 August 2024	14	DF	(Poland) Wojciech Golla	32	3–3	(Italy) Fiorentina (A)	Conference League	

100th appearances

The following players made their 100th appearances in the Nemzeti Bajnokság (Hungarian domestic league).

Date	No.	Pos.	Player	Age	Final score	Opponent	Competition	Ref.
14 December 2024	17	DF	(Czech Republic) Patrizio Stronati	30	3–1	Paks (H)	Nemzeti Bajnokság, Round 17	

150th appearances

The following players made their 150th appearances for Puskás Akadémia FC's first team during the campaign.

Date	No.	Pos.	Player	Age	Final score	Opponent	Competition	Ref.
3 May 2025	19	MF	(Ukraine) Artem Favorov	31	1–1	Ferencváros (A)	Nemzeti Bajnokság, Round 30	

First goals

The following players scored their first goals for Puskás Akadémia FC's first team during the campaign.

Keys

- Score – The score at the time of the goal. Puskás Akadémia FC's score listed first.
- Final score – The score at full time; Puskás Akadémia FC's listed first.

Date	No.	Pos.	Player	Age	Score	Final score	Opponent	Competition	Ref.
15 September 2024	99	FW	(Hungary) Zalán Kerezsi^{*}	21	4–0	7–0	Szombathelyi; MÁV Haladás II (A)	Magyar Kupa	
15 September 2024	77	FW	(Hungary) Kevin Mondovics	17	6–0	7–0	Szombathelyi; MÁV Haladás II (A)	Magyar Kupa	
