= Vékony =

Vékony is a Hungarian surname meaning "thin". Notable people with the name include:

- Bence Vékony (born 2005), Hungarian footballer
- Gábor Vékony (1944–2004), Hungarian historian, archaeologist and linguist
