= Jakov Puljić =

Croatian footballer

Personal information
- Date of birth: 4 August 1993 (age 33)
- Place of birth: Vinkovci, Croatia
- Height: 1.87 m (6 ft 1 1/2 in)
- Position: Striker

Team information
- Current team: Rijeka
- Number: 21

Youth career
- 2000−2011: Cibalia

Senior career*
Years	Team	Apps	(Gls)
2011−2015	Cibalia	83	(20)
2015−2016	Lokomotiva	13	(0)
2016	→ Inter Zaprešić (loan)	12	(2)
2016–2017	Inter Zaprešić	38	(15)
2017–2020	Rijeka	62	(24)
2020–2021	Jagiellonia	41	(16)
2021–2025	Puskás Akadémia	55	(11)
2025–2026	Vukovar 1991	33	(17)
2026–	Rijeka	3	(1)

International career
2009	Croatia U16	6	(0)
2009	Croatia U17	7	(1)
2011−2012	Croatia U19	3	(1)
- * Club domestic league appearances and goals as of 10:12, 24 August 2026 (UTC)

Jakov Puljić (born 4 August 1993) is a Croatian professional footballer who plays as a striker for Croatian Football League club Rijeka.

== Club career ==
Having passed through the ranks of HNK Cibalia youth academy, Puljić made his 1. HNL debut for the club on 3 March 2012, when he entered as a substitute in a 2–0 home win to NK Karlovac. Following four seasons with Cibalia, in June 2015 he joined NK Lokomotiva. In January 2016, Puljić was loaned to NK Inter Zaprešić until the end of the season. Six months later, in July 2016, he transferred outright to Inter Zaprešić. After a prolific 2016–17 season, during which he scored 11 league goals, Puljić caught the attention from other clubs in Croatia. Eventually, on 31 August 2017, he was signed by the Croatian champions, HNK Rijeka, on a season-long loan with a buying obligation.

== Club statistics ==
As of match played 23 May 2026

Appearances and goals by club, season and competition
Club	Season	League			National cup (Note: Includes Croatian Cup, Polish Cup, Magyar Kupa)		Europe		Total	
Club	Season	Apps	Goals	Apps	Goals	Apps	Goals	Apps	Goals	
Cibalia	2011–12	1. HNL	9	0	2	0	—		11	0
Cibalia	2012–13	1. HNL	20	1	3	1	—		23	2
Cibalia	2013–14	2. HNL	27	3	1	0	—		28	3
Cibalia	2014–15	2. HNL	27	16	2	3	—		29	19
Cibalia	Total		83	20	8	4	0	0	91	24
Lokomotiva	2015–16	1. HNL	13	0	2	0	1 (Note: Appearance(s) in UEFA Europa League)	0	16	0
Lokomotiva	2016–17	1. HNL	0	0	—		2	0	2	0
Lokomotiva	Total		13	0	2	0	3	0	18	0
Inter Zaprešić (loan)	2015–16	1. HNL	12	2	1	0	—		13	2
Inter Zaprešić	2016–17	1. HNL	31	11	2	2	—		33	13
Inter Zaprešić	2017–18	1. HNL	7	4	—		—		7	4
Inter Zaprešić	Total		38	15	2	2	0	0	40	17
Rijeka	2017–18	1. HNL	25	8	3	2	4	1	32	11
Rijeka	2018–19	1. HNL	29	16	4	1	1	0	34	17
Rijeka	2019–20	1. HNL	8	0	1	0	2	1	11	1
Rijeka	Total		62	24	8	3	7	2	77	29
Jagiellonia Białystok	2019–20	Ekstraklasa	16	5	—		—		16	5
Jagiellonia Białystok	2020–21	Ekstraklasa	25	11	1	1	—		26	12
Jagiellonia Białystok	Total		41	16	1	1	0	0	42	17
Puskás Akadémia	2021–22	Nemzeti Bajnokság I	11	2	1	0	3 (Note: Appearance(s) in UEFA Conference League)	0	15	2
Puskás Akadémia	2022–23	Nemzeti Bajnokság I	19	4	4	1	1	0	24	5
Puskás Akadémia	2023–24	Nemzeti Bajnokság I	15	4	1	0	—		16	4
Puskás Akadémia	2024–25	Nemzeti Bajnokság I	11	1	2	2	4	0	17	3
Puskás Akadémia	Total		56	11	8	3	8	0	72	14
Vukovar 1991	2025–26	1. HNL	33	17	—		—		33	17
Career total			338	105	30	13	18	2	386	120

== Honours ==
Rijeka

- Croatian Cup: 2018–19
