= Kevin Mondovics =

Hungarian footballer (born 2007)

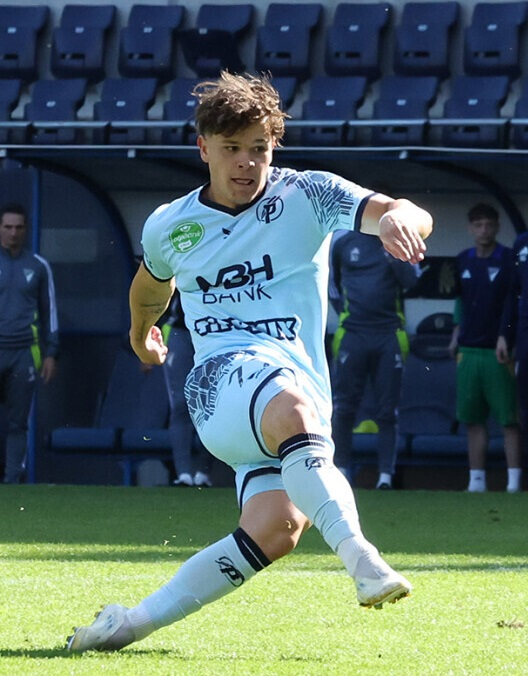
- Mondovics moments before scoring his first NB I goal in 2025

Personal information
- Date of birth: 14 March 2007 (age 19)
- Place of birth: Győr, Hungary
- Height: 1.78 m (5 ft 10 in)
- Position: Forward

Team information
- Current team: Puskás Akadémia
- Number: 77

Youth career
- 2013–2018: Gyirmót
- 2018–2024: Puskás Akadémia

Senior career*
Years	Team	Apps	(Gls)
2023–	Puskás Akadémia II	16	(7)
2024–	Puskás Akadémia	20	(1)
2025	→ Csákvár (loan)	19	(4)

International career^{‡}
2022	Hungary U15	1	(0)
2022–2023	Hungary U16	4	(1)
2023–2024	Hungary U17	9	(4)
2024–	Hungary U19	9	(1)
2025	Hungary U18	2	(0)
- * Club domestic league appearances and goals as of 30 May 2026 ‡ National team caps and goals as of 15 November 2025

Kevin Mondovics (born 14 March 2007) is a Hungarian professional footballer who plays as a forward for Nemzeti Bajnokság I club Puskás Akadémia and the Hungary U19 national team.

== Career ==
=== Puskás Akadémia ===
Born in Győr, Mondovics joined Puskás Akadémia's academy from Gyirmót in 2018. He made his breakthrough in the 2023–24 season, featuring and scoring for the reserve side in the Nemzeti Bajnokság III before also appearing for the senior team. Mondovics made his Nemzeti Bajnokság I debut on 10 February 2024, featuring in a 2–0 away victory against Kisvárda.

He subsequently joined Nemzeti Bajnokság II club Csákvár on a cooperation agreement, where he played at senior level and continued his development.

Mondovics scored five goals for PAFC's U19s in the 2024–25 UEFA Youth League campaign, finishing as the squad's top goalscorer. In the Round of 32, he scored in the 80th minute against Aston Villa to reduce the deficit to 1–2, but the team were ultimately eliminated from the competition.

He scored his first Nemzeti Bajnokság I goal on 10 May 2025 in a 4–2 home victory against Debrecen, after being brought on as a substitute in stoppage time. Mondovics signed a contract extension with the club on 26 September, which runs until the summer of 2028.

== Career statistics ==
=== Club ===
As of match played 31 January 2026

Appearances and goals by club, season and competition
Club	Season	League			Magyar Kupa		Total	
Club	Season	Division	Apps	Goals	Apps	Goals	Apps	Goals
Puskás Akadémia II	2023–24	Nemzeti Bajnokság III	5	1	—		5	1
Puskás Akadémia II	2024–25	Nemzeti Bajnokság III	9	6	—		9	6
Puskás Akadémia II	2025–26	Nemzeti Bajnokság III	2	0	—		2	0
Puskás Akadémia II	Total		16	7	—		16	7
Puskás Akadémia	2023–24	Nemzeti Bajnokság I	2	0	—		2	0
Puskás Akadémia	2024–25	Nemzeti Bajnokság I	8	1	2	1	10	2
Puskás Akadémia	2025–26	Nemzeti Bajnokság I	2	0	—		2	0
Puskás Akadémia	Total		12	1	2	1	14	2
Csákvár (loan)	2024–25	Nemzeti Bajnokság II	6	1	—		6	1
Csákvár (loan)	2025–26	Nemzeti Bajnokság II	10	2	0	0	10	2
Csákvár (loan)	Total		16	3	0	0	16	3
Career total			44	11	2	1	46	12

=== International ===
As of match played 15 November 2025

Appearances and goals by national team and year
Team	Year	Total	
Team	Year	Apps	Goals
Hungary U15	2022	1	0
Hungary U16	2022	2	1
Hungary U16	2023	2	0
Hungary U16	Total	4	1
Hungary U17	2023	6	2
Hungary U17	2024	3	2
Hungary U17	Total	9	4
Hungary U19	2024	2	0
Hungary U19	2025	7	1
Hungary U19	Total	9	1
Hungary U18	2025	2	0
Career total		25	6

Scores and results list Hungary's goal tally first, score column indicates score after each Mondovics goal.

All youth international goals scored by Kevin Mondovics
No.	Team	Cap	Date	Venue	Opponent	Score	Result	Competition
1	Hungary U16	2	8 September 2022	UTE Szilágyi Sporttelep, Budapest, Hungary	Czech Republic U16	2–1	3–3	Friendly
1	Hungary U17	6	31 October 2023	Globall Football Park, Telki, Hungary	Bosnia and Herzegovina U17	1–0	3–1	2024 UEFA European Under-17 Championship qualification
2	Hungary U17	6	31 October 2023	Globall Football Park, Telki, Hungary	Bosnia and Herzegovina U17	2–0	3–1	2024 UEFA European Under-17 Championship qualification
3	Hungary U17	7	20 March 2024	St George's Park National Football Centre, Burton upon Trent, England	France U17	1–2	1–2	2024 UEFA European Under-17 Championship qualification
4	Hungary U17	9	26 March 2024	St George's Park National Football Centre, Burton upon Trent, England	Northern Ireland U17	1–0	1–3	2024 UEFA European Under-17 Championship qualification
1	Hungary U19	5	25 March 2025	Balmazújvárosi Városi Sportpálya, Balmazújváros, Hungary	Iceland U19	1–0	1–0	2025 UEFA European Under-19 Championship qualification
