= Ármin Pécsi =

Hungary international footballer (born 2005)

Personal information
- Full name: Ármin Pécsi
- Date of birth: 24 February 2005 (age 21)
- Place of birth: Hainburg an der Donau, Austria
- Height: 1.90 m (6 ft 3 in)
- Position: Goalkeeper

Team information
- Current team: TSV Hartberg (on loan from Liverpool)
- Number: 91

Youth career
- 2018–2022: Puskás Akadémia

Senior career*
Years	Team	Apps	(Gls)
2022–2025	Puskás Akadémia	46	(0)
2022–2023	→ Csákvár (loan)	18	(0)
2025–	Liverpool	0	(0)
2026–	→ TSV Hartberg (loan)	12	(0)

International career^{‡}
2021	Hungary U17	9	(0)
2022–2023	Hungary U19	15	(0)
2024–	Hungary U21	9	(0)
2026–	Hungary	1	(0)
- * Club domestic league appearances and goals as of 23:11, 22 August 2026 (UTC) ‡ National team caps and goals as of 08:07 10 June 2026 (UTC)

Ármin Pécsi (Hungarian pronunciation: [aːɾmin peːʧi]; born 24 February 2005) is a professional footballer who plays as a goalkeeper for Austrian Bundesliga club TSV Hartberg, on loan from Premier League club Liverpool. Born in Austria, he plays for the Hungary national team.

== Club career ==
=== Puskás Akadémia ===
Pécsi began training with the first-team of Puskás Akadémia when he was 16 years old, and featured for the club in a friendly match against Club Brugge at that age. He became a regular starter during the 2024–25 season, and made 36 appearances in all competitions, in which he kept 11 clean sheets. With the club, he finished second that season in the Nemzeti Bajnokság I. At the end of the season, he was one of three goalkeepers nominated for the Golden Boy award.

=== Liverpool ===
On 7 June 2025, Pécsi signed for English Premier League club Liverpool.

==== Loan to TSV Hartberg ====
On 23 July 2026, he had joined Austrian Bundesliga club TSV Hartberg, on a season-long loan for the 2026–27 season.

== International career ==
Born in Austria, Pécsi has represented Hungary at youth level.

He made his senior international debut as a substitute in a 3–1 friendly win over Kazakhstan at Nagyerdei Stadion in Debrecen on 9 June 2026.

== Career statistics ==
=== Club ===
As of match played 25 May 2025

Appearances and goals by club, season and competition
Club	Season	League			National cup (Note: Includes Magyar Kupa)		League cup		Europe		Other		Total	
Club	Season	Division	Apps	Goals	Apps	Goals	Apps	Goals	Apps	Goals	Apps	Goals	Apps	Goals
Puskás Akadémia	2023–24	NB I	16	0	0	0	—		—		—		16	0
Puskás Akadémia	2024–25	NB I	30	0	1	0	—		4 (Note: Appearances in UEFA Conference League)	0	—		35	0
Puskás Akadémia	Total		46	0	1	0	—		4	0	—		51	0
Csákvár (loan)	2023–24	NB II	18	0	—		—		—		—		18	0
Liverpool	2025–26	Premier League	0	0	0	0	0	0	0	0	0	0	0	0
Career total			64	0	1	0	0	0	4	0	0	0	69	0

=== International ===
As of match played 9 June 2026

Appearances and goals by national team and year
National team	Year	Apps	Goals
Hungary	2026	1	0
Total		1	0
