= Wojciech Golla =

Polish footballer (born 1992)

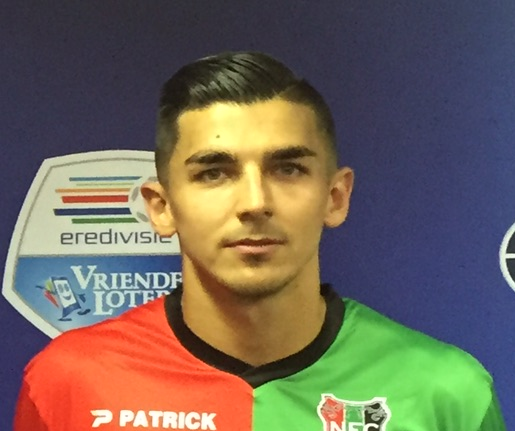
- Golla with NEC in 2017

Personal information
- Date of birth: 12 January 1992 (age 34)
- Place of birth: Złotów, Poland
- Height: 1.85 m (6 ft 1 in)
- Position: Centre-back

Team information
- Current team: Puskás Akadémia
- Number: 14

Youth career
- Sparta Złotów
- 2007–2009: Lech Poznań

Senior career*
Years	Team	Apps	(Gls)
2010–2011	Lech Poznań	0	(0)
2011–2015	Pogoń Szczecin	95	(2)
2015–2018	NEC	94	(7)
2018–2022	Śląsk Wrocław	93	(3)
2022–	Puskás Akadémia	107	(7)

International career
2008	Poland U16	6	(0)
2009	Poland U17	1	(1)
2010	Poland U18	7	(1)
2010–2011	Poland U19	11	(0)
2011	Poland U20	3	(0)
2012–2014	Poland U21	5	(0)
2014	Poland	1	(0)
- * Club domestic league appearances and goals as of 17 October 2026

Wojciech Golla (born 12 January 1992) is a Polish professional footballer who plays as a centre-back for the Hungarian NB I club Puskás Akadémia. He previously played for Lech Poznań, Pogoń Szczecin, N.E.C. Nijmegen and Śląsk Wrocław.

== Career statistics ==
=== Club ===
As of match played 1 May 2026

Appearances and goals by club, season and competition
Club	Season	League			National cup (Note: Includes Polish Cup, KNVB Cup, Magyar Kupa)		Europe		Other		Total	
Club	Season	Division	Apps	Goals	Apps	Goals	Apps	Goals	Apps	Goals	Apps	Goals
Lech Poznań	2008–09	Ekstraklasa	0	0	0	0	—		1 (Note: Appearance in Ekstraklasa Cup)	0	1	0
Pogoń Szczecin	2011–12	I liga	11	0	0	0	—		—		11	0
Pogoń Szczecin	2012–13	Ekstraklasa	18	0	0	0	—		—		18	0
Pogoń Szczecin	2013–14	Ekstraklasa	32	1	1	0	—		—		33	1
Pogoń Szczecin	2014–15	Ekstraklasa	34	1	2	0	—		—		36	1
Pogoń Szczecin	Total		95	2	3	0	—		—		98	2
Pogoń Szczecin	2012–13	III liga, gr. D	3	0	—		—		—		3	0
NEC	2015–16	Eredivisie	29	0	3	0	—		—		32	0
NEC	2016–17	Eredivisie	33	0	1	0	—		4 (Note: Appearances in Eredivisie promotion/relegation play-offs)	0	38	0
NEC	2017–18	Eerste Divisie	32	6	2	0	—		2	0	36	6
NEC	Total		94	6	6	0	—		6	0	106	6
Śląsk Wrocław	2018–19	Ekstraklasa	35	1	3	0	—		—		38	1
Śląsk Wrocław	2019–20	Ekstraklasa	19	1	0	0	—		—		19	1
Śląsk Wrocław	2020–21	Ekstraklasa	8	1	1	0	—		—		9	1
Śląsk Wrocław	2021–22	Ekstraklasa	31	0	1	0	6 (Note: Appearances in UEFA Conference League)	1	—		38	1
Śląsk Wrocław	Total		93	3	5	0	6	1	—		104	4
Puskás Akadémia	2022–23	NB I	11	0	2	0	—		—		13	0
Puskás Akadémia	2023–24	NB I	28	3	2	0	—		—		30	3
Puskás Akadémia	2024–25	NB I	28	2	3	1	4	1	—		35	4
Puskás Akadémia	2025–26	NB I	30	2	0	0	2	0	—		32	2
Puskás Akadémia	Total		97	7	7	1	6	1	—		110	9
Career total			382	18	21	1	12	2	7	0	422	21
