= Laros Duarte =

Cape Verdean footballer (born 1997)

Personal information
- Full name: Laros Michael D'Encarnação Duarte
- Date of birth: 28 February 1997 (age 29)
- Place of birth: Rotterdam, Netherlands
- Height: 1.80 m (5 ft 11 in)
- Position: Midfielder

Team information
- Current team: Puskás Akadémia
- Number: 6

Youth career
- Sparta

Senior career*
Years	Team	Apps	(Gls)
2015–2019	Jong PSV	72	(2)
2019	→ Sparta (loan)	16	(3)
2019–2021	Sparta	36	(2)
2021–2024	Groningen	76	(8)
2024–	Puskás Akadémia	54	(1)

International career^{‡}
2013	Netherlands U16	3	(0)
2014	Netherlands U17	1	(0)
2014–2015	Netherlands U18	6	(1)
2015–2016	Netherlands U19	14	(0)
2018	Netherlands U20	1	(0)
2024–	Cape Verde	24	(1)
- * Club domestic league appearances and goals as of 30 May 2026 ‡ National team caps and goals as of 4 July 2026

Laros Michael d'Encarnação Duarte (Dutch: [ˈla.ɾos mɪ.ˈxa.əl] Portuguese: [dẽ.kɐɾ.nɐ.ˈsɐ̃w du.ˈaɾ.tɨ]; born 28 February 1997) is a professional footballer who plays as a midfielder for Hungarian club Puskás Akadémia. Born in the Netherlands, he plays for the Cape Verde national team.

== Club career ==
Duarte made his debut for Eerste Divisie side Jong PSV in 2015. In the 2015–16 season, the footballer joined PSV. He used to play for Sparta Rotterdam from Rotterdam before he moved to Eindhoven.

On 31 August 2021, he signed a four-year contract with Groningen.

On 23 August 2024, Duarte joined Puskás Akadémia in Hungary on a three-year contract.

== International career ==
Born in the Netherlands, Duarte is of Cape Verdean descent but played 14 games for the Netherlands national under-19 football team. He was called up to the Cape Verde national team for a set of 2023 Africa Cup of Nations qualification matches in September 2023.

On 18 May 2026, he was called up by Cape Verde's head coach Bubista for the 2026 FIFA World Cup.

== Personal life ==
He is the older brother of Deroy Duarte. Despite his last name, place of birth and country of descent; he is not related to fellow footballer Lerin Duarte.

== Career statistics ==
=== Club ===
As of match played 2 May 2026

Appearances and goals by club, season and competition
Club	Season	League			National Cup		Europe		Other		Total	
Club	Season	Division	Apps	Goals	Apps	Goals	Apps	Goals	Apps	Goals	Apps	Goals
Jong PSV	2015–16	Eerste Divisie	7	0	—		—		2 (Note: Appearances in Premier League Cup)	0	9	0
Jong PSV	2016–17	Eerste Divisie	14	0	—		—		—		14	0
Jong PSV	2017–18	Eerste Divisie	32	2	—		—		2	0	34	2
Jong PSV	2018–19	Eerste Divisie	19	0	—		—		2	0	21	0
Jong PSV	Total		72	2	—		—		6	0	78	2
Sparta Rotterdam (loan)	2018–19	Eerste Divisie	16	3	—		—		4 (Note: Appearances in promotion play-offs)	0	20	3
Sparta Rotterdam	2019–20	Eredivisie	16	0	2	0	—		—		18	0
Sparta Rotterdam	2020–21	Eredivisie	17	2	1	0	—		1 (Note: Appearance in European play-offs)	0	19	0
Sparta Rotterdam	2021–22	Eredivisie	3	0	0	0	—		—		3	0
Sparta Rotterdam	Total		36	2	3	0	—		1	0	40	2
Groningen	2021–22	Eredivisie	27	1	2	0	—		—		29	1
Groningen	2022–23	Eredivisie	25	2	0	0	—		—		25	4
Groningen	2023–24	Eerste Divisie	23	5	3	2	—		—		26	7
Groningen	2024–25	Eredivisie	1	0	0	0	—		—		1	0
Groningen	Total		76	8	5	2	—		—		81	10
Puskás Akadémia	2024–25	Nemzeti Bajnokság I	24	1	2	0	0	0	—		26	1
Puskás Akadémia	2025–26	Nemzeti Bajnokság I	30	0	1	0	2 (Note: Appearances in UEFA Conference League)	0	—		34	0
Puskás Akadémia	Total		54	1	3	0	2	0	—		59	1
Career total			254	11	11	2	2	0	11	0	279	13

=== International ===
As of matches played 3 July 2026

Appearances and goals by national team and year
National team	Year	Apps	Goals
Cape Verde	2024	9	0
Cape Verde	2025	7	0
Cape Verde	2026	8	1
Total		24	1

Scores and results list Cape Verde goal tally first, score column indicates score after each Duarte goal

List of international goals scored by Laros Duarte
No.	Date	Venue	Opponent	Score	Result	Competition
1	31 May 2026	Estádio do Restelo, Lisbon, Portugal	Serbia	2–0	3–0	Friendly
