= Bence Vékony =

Hungarian footballer (born 2005)

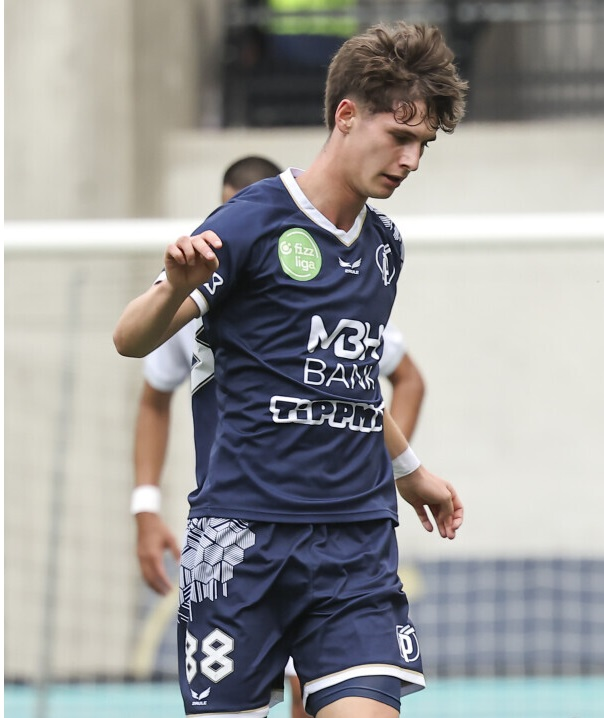
- Vékony playing for Puskás Akadémia in 2025

Personal information
- Full name: Bence Zsolt Vékony
- Date of birth: 12 November 2005 (age 20)
- Height: 1.77 m (5 ft 10 in)
- Position: Midfielder

Team information
- Current team: Puskás Akadémia
- Number: 88

Youth career
- 2012–2014: Zalakaros
- 2014–2016: Nagykanizsa
- 2016–2017: Zalaegerszeg
- 2017–2018: Haladás
- 2018–2019: Illés Akadémia
- 2019–2023: Puskás Akadémia

Senior career*
Years	Team	Apps	(Gls)
2023–	Puskás Akadémia II	47	(8)
2023–	Puskás Akadémia	33	(0)
- * Club domestic league appearances and goals as of 31 May 2026

Bence Zsolt Vékony (born 12 November 2005) is a Hungarian professional footballer who plays as a midfielder for Nemzeti Bajnokság I club Puskás Akadémia.

== Career ==
=== Puskás Akadémia ===
He joined Puskás Akadémia in 2019, progressing through the youth teams before playing for the club's Nemzeti Bajnokság III reserve side.

On 7 February 2024, Vékony debuted both in the Puskás Akadémia and Nemzeti Bajnokság I, coming on as a substitute for Artem Favorov in the 83rd minute against Zalaegerszeg, as the home match ended in a 0–1 defeat.

On 4 September, Puskás Akadémia announced that home-grown midfielder Vékony had extended his contract with the club until the summer of 2027. On 30 October, he scored the decisive goal that avoided extra time in the Magyar Kupa, as the team recorded a 3–2 away victory over Nemzeti Bajnokság II side Tatabánya.

== Career statistics ==
As of match played 31 January 2026

Appearances and goals by club, season and competition
Club	Season	League			Magyar Kupa		Europe		Total	
Club	Season	Division	Apps	Goals	Apps	Goals	Apps	Goals	Apps	Goals
Puskás Akadémia II	2022–23	Nemzeti Bajnokság III	12	1	—		—		12	1
Puskás Akadémia II	2023–24	Nemzeti Bajnokság III	24	7	—		—		24	7
Puskás Akadémia II	2024–25	Nemzeti Bajnokság III	8	0	—		—		8	0
Puskás Akadémia II	2025–26	Nemzeti Bajnokság III	3	0	—		—		3	0
Puskás Akadémia II	Total		47	8	—		—		47	8
Puskás Akadémia	2023–24	Nemzeti Bajnokság I	4	0	—		—		4	0
Puskás Akadémia	2024–25	Nemzeti Bajnokság I	13	0	2	1	1 (Note: Appearance in UEFA Conference League)	0	16	1
Puskás Akadémia	2025–26	Nemzeti Bajnokság I	14	0	0	0	0	0	14	0
Puskás Akadémia	Total		31	0	2	1	1	0	34	1
Career total			78	8	2	1	1	0	81	9
