= Quentin Maceiras =

Swiss footballer (born 1995)

Personal information
- Full name: Quentin Maceiras Pralong
- Date of birth: 10 October 1995 (age 31)
- Place of birth: Sion, Switzerland
- Height: 1.81 m (5 ft 11 in)
- Position: Defender

Team information
- Current team: Servette
- Number: 23

Youth career
- –2013: Sion

Senior career*
| Years | Team | Apps | (Gls) |
| 2013–2014 | FC Sierre | 22 | (1) |
| 2014–2016 | Naters | 39 | (1) |
| 2016–2019 | Sion II | 38 | (0) |
| 2016–2020 | Sion | 83 | (3) |
| 2020–2023 | Young Boys | 52 | (1) |
| 2022 | Young Boys II | 2 | (0) |
| 2023–2026 | Puskás Akadémia | 85 | (0) |
| 2026– | Servette | 8 | (0) |
- * Club domestic league appearances and goals as of 28 September 2026

Quentin Maceiras Pralong (born 10 October 1995) is a Swiss professional footballer who plays as a defender for Swiss Super League club Servette.

== Personal life ==
Maceiras was born in Switzerland and is of Spanish descent.

== Club career ==
On 25 July 2023, Maceiras signed a two-year contract with Puskás Akadémia in Hungary.

On 7 July 2026, Maceiras returned to Switzerland and joined Servette on a two-season deal.

== Career statistics ==
=== Club ===
As of match played 18 May 2024

Appearances and goals by club, season and competition
| Club | Season | League | | | National cup (Note: Includes Swiss Cup, Magyar Kupa) | | Europe | | Total | |
| Club | Season | Division | Apps | Goals | Apps | Goals | Apps | Goals | Apps | Goals |
|---|---|---|---|---|---|---|---|---|---|---|
| Sion | 2016–17 | Swiss Super League | 1 | 0 | — | | — | | 1 | 0 |
| Sion | 2016–17 | Swiss Super League | 2 | 1 | — | | — | | 2 | 1 |
| Sion | 2017–18 | Swiss Super League | 21 | 0 | 2 | 1 | 2 (Note: Appearances in UEFA Europa League) | 0 | 25 | 1 |
| Sion | 2018–19 | Swiss Super League | 30 | 1 | 4 | 0 | — | | 34 | 1 |
| Sion | 2019–20 | Swiss Super League | 30 | 0 | 5 | 0 | — | | 35 | 0 |
| Sion | Total | | 84 | 2 | 11 | 1 | 2 | 0 | 97 | 3 |
| Young Boys | 2020–21 | Swiss Super League | 21 | 1 | 1 | 0 | 4 (Note: One appearance in UEFA Champions League, three appearances in UEFA Europa League) | 0 | 26 | 1 |
| Young Boys | 2021–22 | Swiss Super League | 24 | 0 | 2 | 1 | 7 (Note: Appearances in UEFA Champions League) | 0 | 33 | 1 |
| Young Boys | 2022–23 | Swiss Super League | 7 | 0 | 2 | 0 | 1 | 0 | 10 | 0 |
| Young Boys | Total | | 52 | 1 | 5 | 1 | 12 | 0 | 69 | 2 |
| Puskás Akadémia | 2023–24 | Nemzeti Bajnokság I | 26 | 0 | 0 | 0 | — | | 26 | 0 |
| Puskás Akadémia | 2024–25 | Nemzeti Bajnokság I | 0 | 0 | 0 | 0 | 0 | 0 | 0 | 0 |
| Puskás Akadémia | Total | | 26 | 0 | 0 | 0 | 0 | 0 | 26 | 0 |
| Career total | | | 162 | 3 | 16 | 2 | 14 | 0 | 192 | 5 |

== Honours ==
FC Sion

- Swiss Cup: 2019–20

Young Boys

- Swiss Super League: 2020–21, 2023–24
- Swiss Cup: 2022–23
