= Mikael Soisalo =

Finnish footballer (born 1998)

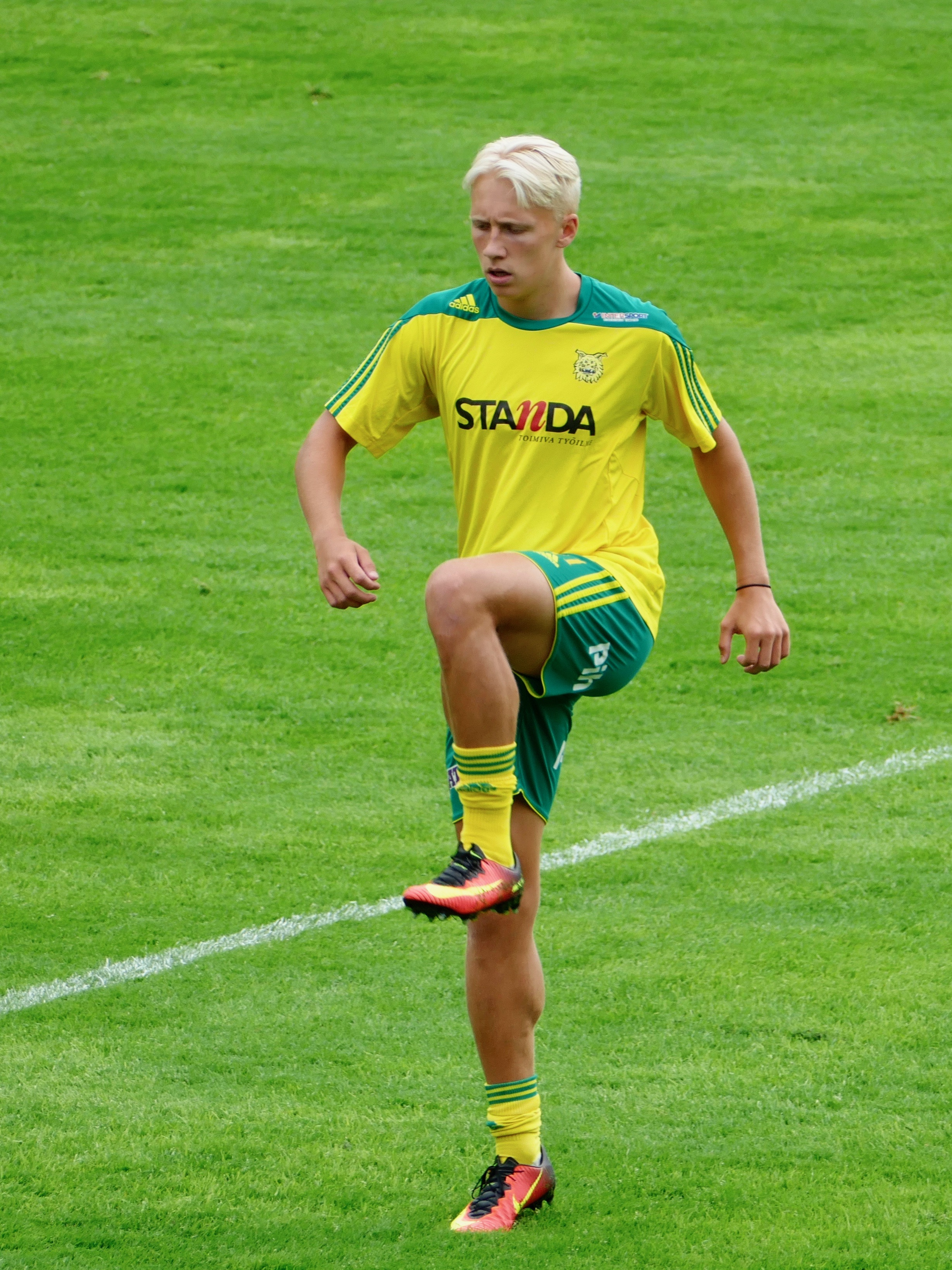
- Soisalo with Ilves in 2016

Personal information
- Full name: Mikael Soisalo
- Date of birth: 24 April 1998 (age 28)
- Place of birth: Helsinki, Finland
- Height: 1.81 m (5 ft 11 1/2 in)
- Position: Right winger

Team information
- Current team: Puskás Akadémia
- Number: 20

Youth career
- 2002–2012: Honka
- 2012–2015: HJK
- 2017–2018: Middlesbrough

Senior career*
Years	Team	Apps	(Gls)
2015	Klubi 04	4	(0)
2016	Ilves	31	(7)
2017–2018	Middlesbrough	0	(0)
2018–2020	Zulte Waregem	32	(1)
2021	→ Varzim (loan)	2	(0)
2021–2023	Riga FC	67	(16)
2023–	Puskás Akadémia	71	(2)

International career^{‡}
2013–2014	Finland U16	8	(1)
2014–2015	Finland U17	13	(2)
2016	Finland U18	10	(3)
2016–2017	Finland U19	6	(2)
2017–2020	Finland U21	20	(2)
2022–	Finland	4	(0)
Medal record
Klubi 04
First place	Kakkonen Eastern Group	2015
- * Club domestic league appearances and goals as of 30 May 2026 ‡ National team caps and goals as of 17 November 2022

Mikael Soisalo (born 24 April 1998) is a Finnish professional footballer who plays as a right-winger for Hungarian club Puskás Akadémia. He has also represented the Finland national under-21 football team. Soisalo was born in Helsinki, Finland. He began his senior club career on league level playing for Ilves, before signing with Zulte Waregem at age 20 in 2018.

== Club career ==
=== Klubi 04 ===
He started his career playing for in the lower leagues of Finnish football in HJKs reserve team. He has also played for the junior teams of Finland national football team.

=== Ilves ===
On 14 December 2015 it was announced he had joined Ilves a team from Tampere on a 3-year contract.

He stated that his goal for the 2016 Veikkausliiga (Finnish 1 tier) season would be to get a start in the starting line-up. He played an active role in the team's success, they finished fourth in the league and at times they even fought for the championship.

=== Middlesbrough ===
On 5 January 2017, Soisalo joined Middlesbrough on a three-year deal for an undisclosed fee, reported to be around €200,000, and was registered to their U21 academy squad.

On 13 March 2017, he scored a hat-trick for the Middlesbrough reserves against Blackburn reserves. The manager praised him for his performance and how he had integrated into the team.

=== Zulte Waregem ===
On 18 June 2018, Middlesbrough announced that Soisalo was to join Belgian side Zulte Waregem after just one full season with Middlesbrough's U-23 side. The transfer fee was not disclosed.

Varzim (loan)
Soisalo was loaned out to Portuguese club Varzim S.C. on 29 January 2020 for the rest of the season with a purchase option. However, he only played two games for the club and returned to Zulte in the summer 2020.

=== Riga FC ===
For the 2021 season, Soisalo moved to Riga FC on a 2-year contract. He made his debut on 13 March, playing the first 65 minutes of a 0–2 win at Ventspils. He had an impressive start and had scored seven goals in 15 games in July 2021.

=== Puskás Akadémia ===
On 27 August 2023, Soisalo was bought by Hungarian top-flight club Puskás Akadémia for an undisclosed fee. He scored in his debut, in a 3–1 away victory against Mezőkövesd on 3 September 2023.

== International career ==
He has been an integral part of the various youth national teams starting from the U-15. During 2016, he took part in Finland's qualifying campaign for the UEFA under 19 Championship. He played well against Kazakhstan, scoring once and assisting three goals. He scored his first goal for Finland U21 on 9 October 2020 in a UEFA European U21 Championship qualification match in Ballymena Showgrounds, Ballymena against Northern Ireland U21.

In March 2022, Soisalo received a first call up for the Finland senior squad for the first time, coming into the squad after the withdrawal of Lassi Lappalainen and Onni Valakari for matches against Iceland and Slovakia.

== Career statistics ==
=== Club ===
As of 19 May 2025

Appearances and goals by club, season and competition
Club	Season	League			Cup (Note: Includes Suomen Cup, Latvian Cup and Hungarian Cup)		Europe		Other		Total	
Club	Season	Division	Apps	Goals	Apps	Goals	Apps	Goals	Apps	Goals	Apps	Goals
Klubi 04	2015	Kakkonen	4	0	0	0	—		—		4	0
Ilves	2016	Veikkausliiga	31	7	5	4	—		—		36	11
Zulte Waregem	2018–19	Belgian First Division A	20	1	0	0	—		8 (Note: Appearances in the Belgian Europa League play-offs)	0	28	1
Zulte Waregem	2019–20	Belgian First Division A	2	0	0	0	—		—		2	0
Zulte Waregem	2020–21	Belgian First Division A	2	0	0	0	—		—		2	0
Zulte Waregem	Total		24	1	0	0	0	0	8	0	32	1
Varzim (loan)	2019–20	LigaPro	2	0	0	0	—		—		2	0
Riga FC	2021	Virslīga	19	8	2	0	8 (Note: Includes two appearances in the UEFA Champions League, and six appearances in the UEFA Europa Conference League)	1	—		29	9
Riga FC	2022	Virslīga	27	4	1	0	6 (Note: Includes UEFA Europa Conference League)	2	—		34	6
Riga FC	2023	Virslīga	21	4	0	0	5	0	—		26	4
Riga FC	Total		67	16	3	0	19	3	0	0	89	19
Puskás Akadémia	2023–24	NB I	18	2	2	1	0	0	—		20	3
Puskás Akadémia	2024–25	NB I	29	0	3	0	4 (Note: Appearances in UEFA Conference League)	2	–		36	2
Puskás Akadémia	Total		47	2	5	1	4	2	0	0	56	5
Career total			174	26	13	5	23	5	8	0	218	36

=== International ===
As of match played on 4 June 2024.

Appearances and goals by national team and year
National team	Year	Apps	Goals
Finland	2022	4	0
Total		4	0

== Honours ==
Klubi 04

- Kakkonen Eastern Group: 2015

Riga FC

- Latvian Higher League runner-up: 2022

Individual

- Veikkausliiga Breakthrough of the Year: 2016
- Veikkausliiga Team of the Year: 2016
