= Urho Nissilä =

Finnish footballer (born 1996)

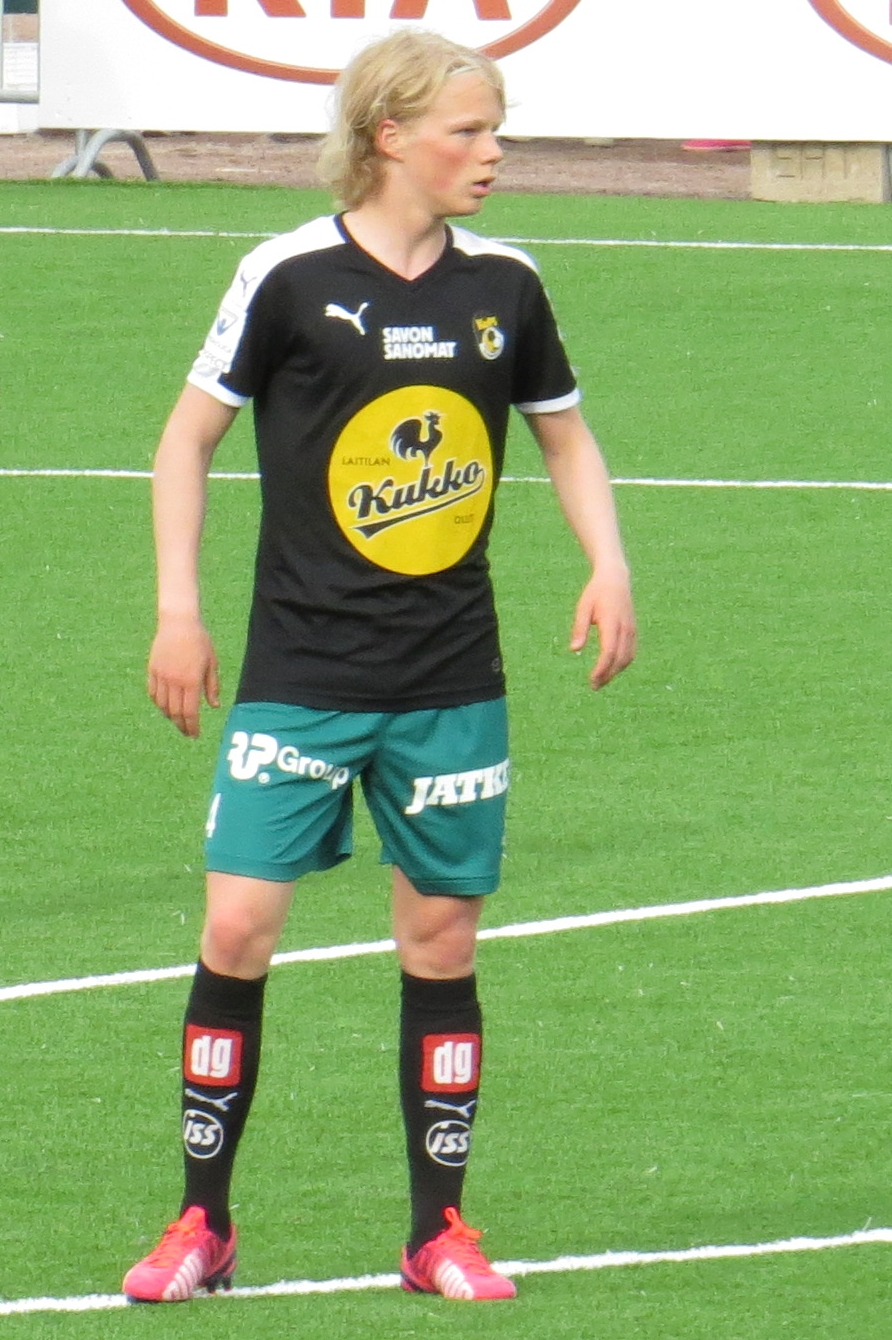
- Nissilä with Kuopion Palloseura in 2015

Personal information
- Date of birth: 4 April 1996 (age 30)
- Place of birth: Kuopio, Finland
- Height: 1.72 m (5 ft 8 in)
- Position: Midfielder

Team information
- Current team: Puskás Akadémia
- Number: 16

Youth career
- 2008–2015: KuPS

Senior career*
Years	Team	Apps	(Gls)
2015–2018	KuPS	89	(14)
2016	→ KuFu-98 (loan)	1	(1)
2018–2020	Zulte Waregem	3	(1)
2019–2020	→ MVV Maastricht (loan)	8	(0)
2020	→ KuPS (loan)	21	(5)
2021	KuPS	25	(8)
2022–2023	Suwon FC	22	(2)
2023	KuPS	15	(6)
2024–	Puskás Akadémia	52	(8)

International career^{‡}
2011	Finland U15	1	(0)
2015	Finland U19	2	(0)
2017–2018	Finland U21	4	(1)
2021–	Finland	15	(0)
- * Club domestic league appearances and goals as of 30 May 2026 ‡ National team caps and goals as of 17 November 2024

Urho Nissilä (born 4 April 1996) is a Finnish professional footballer who plays as a midfielder for Hungarian club Puskás Akadémia and the Finland national team.

== Early life ==
Nissilä was born in Kuopio to a Conservative Laestadian family. Nissilä and his six siblings were raised by their single-parent mother. In Laestadianism, competitive club sports are prohibited, and Nissilä only played football with his brother and friends until aged 10, when his mother reluctantly allowed him to join a youth team of Kuopion Palloseura (KuPS) for the first time.

He later resigned from the Laestadian movement.

== Club career ==
Nissilä started his senior career with KuPS first team in Finnish top-tier Veikkausliiga.

He signed with Belgian First Division A club Zulte Waregem in June 2018. According to media, the transfer fee was the highest in the history of KuPS at the time. He made his debut on 10 November, playing the first 58 minutes of a 2–0 win against Lokeren. In September 2019, Nissilä joined MVV Maastricht in the Dutch Eerste Divisie on a season-long loan deal.

He returned to KuPS on loan in February 2020, and subsequently signed a permanent contract for the 2021 Veikkausliiga season. He represented KuPS in the 2021–22 UEFA Europa Conference League qualifiers, helping his side to advance to the play-off round, by scoring two goals in seven qualifying matches. At the end of the season, Nissilä was named the Veikkausliiga Player of the Year.

Nissilä joined K League 1 side Suwon FC in January 2022. He managed to make 23 appearances and scored two goals for the club, before he suffered an ankle injury in the game and would miss the rest of the season. In early 2023, while attending a Suwon training camp, the club announced they will release Nissilä from his contract.

In the early 2023, he returned to KuPS again on a short contract, and after 19 appearances he left the club in July for taxational reasons. He spent a three-month hiatus from football, and travelled in Thailand and Bali, Indonesia, in the late 2023.

On 29 January 2024, Nissilä signed with Puskás Akadémia in Hungarian first-tier Nemzeti Bajnokság I (NB I), on a deal until the end of the 2024–25 season. On 20 April, Nissilä scored his first goal in NB I, in a 5–0 home win over Paksi. Three weeks later, on 11 May, Nissilä scored a brace, in a 3–1 away win over MTK Budapest. On 19 March 2025, Nissilä signed a two-year contract extension.

== International career ==
He has represented the Finland national under-21 football team.

He made his debut for the Finland national football team on 1 September 2021 in a friendly against Wales. He substituted Jasin-Amin Assehnoun at half-time of a 0–0 home draw. Three days later he gained his first cap in FIFA World Cup qualifications when he replaced Onni Valakari as a substitute on 78th minute in Helsinki Olympic Stadium in a match against Kazakhstan.

In June 2024, after two years since his previous call-up, Nissilä made a comeback to the national team when he was named in the squad for the friendly matches against Portugal and Scotland. Later he would also make two appearances for Finland in the 2024–25 UEFA Nations League B.

== Personal life ==
In November 2024, it was announced that Nissilä would start his mandatory Finnish military service in April 2025.

== Career statistics ==
=== Club ===
As of 26 March 2026

Appearances and goals by club, season and competition
Club	Season	League			National cup (Note: Includes Suomen Cup, KNVB Cup, Korean FA Cup and Magyar Kupa)		League cup (Note: Includes Finnish League Cup)		Continental		Other		Total	
Club	Season	Division	Apps	Goals	Apps	Goals	Apps	Goals	Apps	Goals	Apps	Goals	Apps	Goals
KuPS	2015	Veikkausliiga	23	4	4	1	2	1	—		—		29	6
KuPS	2016	Veikkausliiga	26	0	4	0	3	0	—		—		33	0
KuPS	2017	Veikkausliiga	26	9	6	0	—		—		—		32	9
KuPS	2018	Veikkausliiga	14	1	6	3	—		0	0	—		20	4
KuPS	Total		89	14	20	4	5	1	0	0	0	0	114	19
KuFu-98 (loan)	2016	Kakkonen	1	1	—		—		—		—		1	1
Zulte Waregem	2018–19	Belgian First Division A	2	1	0	0	—		—		1 (Note: Appearances in the Belgian Europa League play-offs)	0	3	1
MVV Maastricht (loan)	2019–20	Eerste Divisie	8	0	1	0	—		—		—		9	0
KuPS (loan)	2020	Veikkausliiga	21	5	2	1	—		4 (Note: Includes one appearance in the UEFA Champions League, and three appearances in the UEFA Europa League)	0	—		27	6
KuPS	2021	Veikkausliiga	25	8	6	1	—		7 (Note: Appearances in the UEFA Conference League)	2	—		38	11
Suwon FC	2022	K League 1	22	2	1	0	—		—		—		23	2
KuPS	2023	Veikkausliiga	15	6	3	0	0	0	1	0	—		19	6
Puskás Akadémia	2023–24	NB I	13	3	—		–		–		–		13	3
Puskás Akadémia	2024–25	NB I	32	5	3	2	—		4	0	–		39	7
Puskás Akadémia	2025–26	NB I	5	0	1	0	–		1	0	–		7	0
Puskás Akadémia	Total		50	8	4	2	0	0	5	0	0	0	59	10
Career total			233	45	37	8	5	1	17	2	1	0	293	56

=== International ===
As of match played on 17 November 2024.

Appearances and goals by national team and year
National team	Year	Apps	Goals
Finland	2021	7	0
Finland	2022	5	0
Finland	2023	0	0
Finland	2024	3	0
Total		15	0

== Honours ==
KuPS

- Veikkausliiga runner-up: 2017, 2021, 2023
- Finnish Cup: 2021

Individual

- Veikkausliiga Player of the Year: 2021
- Veikkausliiga Midfielder of the Year: 2021
- Veikkausliiga Team of the Year: 2021
- Veikkausliiga Player of the Month: August 2021
