= Jonathan Levi (footballer) =

Swedish footballer (born 1996)

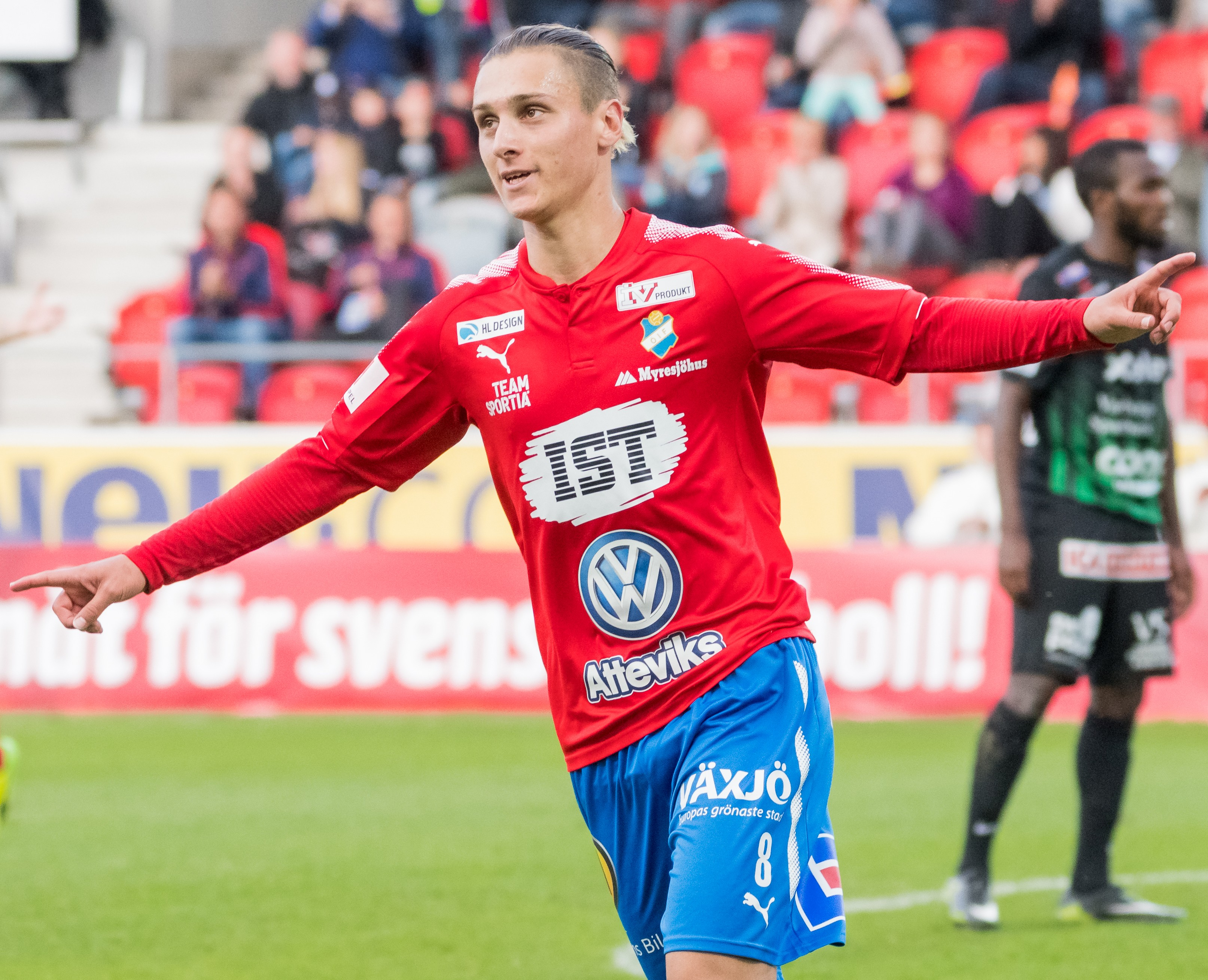
- Levi with Öster in 2017

Personal information
- Full name: Jonathan Alberto Levi
- Date of birth: 23 January 1996 (age 30)
- Place of birth: Glumslöv, Sweden
- Height: 1.85 m (6 ft 1 in)
- Position: Midfielder

Team information
- Current team: Ferencváros
- Number: 10

Youth career
- –2012: Glumslövs FF
- 2013–2014: Eskilsminne IF

Senior career*
Years	Team	Apps	(Gls)
2015	Eskilsminne IF	5	(0)
2015	→ HIF Akademi (loan)	8	(7)
2016	Landskrona BoIS	25	(8)
2017	Östers IF	11	(5)
2017–2020	Rosenborg	26	(4)
2019	→ Elfsborg (loan)	21	(5)
2020–2023	IFK Norrköping	81	(17)
2023–2025	Puskás Akadémia	73	(14)
2025–	Ferencváros	18	(3)

International career^{‡}
2018	Sweden U21	6	(0)
2019	Sweden	1	(0)
- * Club domestic league appearances and goals as of 6 November 2026 ‡ National team caps and goals as of 11 January 2019

Jonathan Alberto Levi (born 23 January 1996) is a Swedish professional footballer who plays as a midfielder for Hungarian club Ferencváros.

== Club career ==
=== Youth years and early senior career ===
Levi grew up in the locality of Glumslöv, situated between the two cities Helsingborg and Landskrona, to a Swedish mother and an Italian father. He started playing football at the local club Glumslövs FF at a young age.

In 2013, he moved to Eskilsminne IF where he joined up with his older brother Christoffer Levi. He made his professional debut two years later in Division 1, the Swedish third tier. Levi however had a hard time breaking in to the squad and joined HIF Akademi, the feeder team of top flight club Helsingborgs IF, on loan during the summer of 2015. He scored 7 goals in 8 appearances for the fourth tier-side during his short loan spell.

=== Landskrona BoIS ===
Ahead of the 2016 season, Levi had a trial with Helsingborgs IF, but was not offered a contract by manager Henrik Larsson. He ultimately signed a two-year deal with Landskrona BoIS in the Swedish third tier.

Levi immediately established himself as a key player at Landskrona, operating on either of the two winger positions or playing as a central attacking midfielder. On 25 August 2016, Levi scored in 3-1–win against then reigning Swedish champions Malmö FF in the Swedish Cup. Even though Landskrona eventually missed out on a promotion, Levi enjoyed much success during his first full season at senior level, scoring 8 goals in 25 matches.

=== Östers IF ===
In November 2016, Levi was sold to Östers IF in Superettan. He signed a three-year deal with the Växjö-based club. Levi made his debut for his new side on 2 April 2017 in an away fixture against Falkenbergs FF, where he settled the score to 2–0 in stoppage time.

Levi went on to score 5 goals in 11 games during the first half of the 2017 season. His performances at Öster reportedly led to interest from BK Häcken, IFK Norrköping and Hammarby IF in Allsvenskan, the Swedish top tier.

=== Rosenborg BK ===
On 8 July 2017, Levi transferred to Rosenborg, reigning champions of Eliteserien. He signed a four-and-a-half-year contract with the club, and the transfer fee was reportedly set at 8 million Swedish kronor with 2.1 million in additional bonuses (approximately £0.9 million in total).

=== Puskás Akadémia ===
On 23 January 2023, Levi signed a two-and-a-half-year contract with Puskás Akadémia in Hungary.

=== Ferencváros ===
On 17 June 2025, he was signed by Nemzeti Bajnokság I record champion Ferencváros. He was given the number 10 shirt. On 9 August 2025, he scores his first goal for Ferencváros in a 4-1 victory over Nyíregyháza Spartacus FC in the 2025–26 Nemzeti Bajnokság I season. On 9 May 2026, he won the 2025–26 Magyar Kupa season with Ferencváros by beating Zalaegerszegi TE 1–0 in the 2026 Magyar Kupa final at Puskás Aréna.

== International career ==
In June 2017, Levi was called up to the Swedish U21 national team by manager Roland Nilsson for a training camp ahead of the 2019 UEFA European Under-21 Championship.

He made his debut for the Sweden senior national team on 11 January 2019 in a friendly against Iceland, as a starter.

== Personal life ==
Jonathan Levi has an Italian father.

== Career statistics ==
=== Club ===
As of match played 26 May 2025

Appearances and goals by club, season and competition
Club	Season	League			National cup		Europe		Other		Total	
Club	Season	Division	Apps	Goals	Apps	Goals	Apps	Goals	Apps	Goals	Apps	Goals
Eskilsminne IF	2015	Division 1 Södra	5	0	8	0	—		—		13	0
Landskrona BoIS	2016	Division 1 Södra	25	8	2	2	—		—		27	10
Öster	2017	Superettan	11	5	0	0	—		—		11	5
Rosenborg	2017	Eliteserien	7	0	1	0	2	0	—		10	0
Rosenborg	2018	Eliteserien	19	4	7	0	13	3	1 (Note: Appearance in Norwegian Super Cup)	0	40	7
Rosenborg	Total		26	4	8	0	15	3	1	0	50	7
Elfsborg (loan)	2019	Allsvenskan	21	5	0	0	—		—		21	5
IFK Norrköping	2020	Allsvenskan	25	9	3	0	—		—		28	9
IFK Norrköping	2021	Allsvenskan	27	2	2	0	—		—		29	2
IFK Norrköping	2022	Allsvenskan	29	6	3	2	—		—		32	8
IFK Norrköping	2023	Allsvenskan	0	0	1	0	—		—		1	0
IFK Norrköping	Total		81	17	9	2	—		—		90	19
Puskás Akadémia	2022–23	NB I	17	1	3	1	—		—		20	2
Puskás Akadémia	2023–24	NB I	24	2	2	0	—		—		26	2
Puskás Akadémia	2024–25	NB I	32	11	2	0	4	0	—		38	11
Puskás Akadémia	Total		73	14	7	1	4	0	—		84	15
Career total			242	53	34	5	19	3	1	0	296	61

== Honours ==
Rosenborg

- Eliteserien: 2017, 2018
- Norwegian Football Cup: 2018
- Mesterfinalen: 2018

Ferencváros

- Hungarian Cup: 2025–26
