= Zsolt Hornyák =

Slovak footballer (born 1973)

Personal information
- Date of birth: 1 May 1973 (age 53)
- Place of birth: Štúrovo, Czechoslovakia
- Height: 1.83 m (6 ft 0 in)
- Position: Defender

Senior career*
Years	Team	Apps	(Gls)
1991–1993	Slovan Bratislava	9	(0)
1993–1997	1. FC Košice	94	(3)
1997–1999	Slovan Bratislava	54	(3)
1999–2001	Inter Bratislava	51	(3)
2001–2002	Dynamo Moscow	24	(1)
2002–2004	Slovan Bratislava	38	(1)
2004–2005	AEP Paphos	21	(1)
2005–2008	Hlučín	50	(2)
2008–2009	ASV Spratzern		
2009	FK Město Albrechtice		
Total		341	(14)

International career
1992	Czechoslovakia U21	4	(0)
2000–2001	Slovakia	3	(0)

Managerial career
- 2012–2013: Mika
- 2013–2015: Banants
- 2017: Mosta
- 2017: Luch-Energiya Vladivostok
- 2018–2019: Slovan Liberec
- 2019–2026: Puskás Akadémia
- * Club domestic league appearances and goals

Zsolt Hornyák (born 1 May 1973) is a Slovak football manager and a former player who was the manager of Hungarian team Puskás Akadémia.

As a player, Hornyák played as a defender. He won the Czechoslovak championship in the 1991–92 season, and following the separation of the two countries, four Slovak championships, and two Slovak cups. Hornyák was capped by Slovakia three times between 2000 and 2001.

== International career ==
Hornyák made his debut for the Slovakia national team in a 2–0 friendly victory over Greece on 15 November 2000. He came on for Vladimír Janočko in the 66th minute. He then appeared as a late substitute in a 1-1 friendly draw with Algeria on 27 February 2001. He made his final appearance for the national team on 7 October 2001 in a 2002 FIFA World Cup qualifying match against Macedonia, which Slovakia won 5–0.

== Managerial career ==
Hornyák worked as a head coach in Armenian football clubs Mika and Banants from 2011 to 2015. In 2011, he was an assistant coach in FC Mika. In 2012, he became a head coach replacing Slovak Jozef Bubenko. In 2012–2013 season FC Mika won Armenian Premier League silver medals and Supercup. Zsolt Hornyák was appointed as a head coach of FC Banants in 2013 leading the team to the gold medals of Armenian Premier League in 2013/2014 season. That was the first title in Armenian Premier League for FC Banants. In 2014 FC Banants under Zsolt Hornyák won Armenian Supercup. He was included in top 10 Slovak coaches list in 2013 (8th place) and 2014 (6th place). He signed a contract with Slovan Liberec in June 2018.

== Personal life ==
On 3 October 2024, Hornyák became a Hungarian citizen.

== Managerial statistics ==
As of 29 September 2024

Team	Nat	From	To	Record							
Team	Nat	From	To	P	W	D	L	GF	GA	GD	W%
Mika	(Armenia)	1 December 2011	30 June 2013	41	21	9	11	53	38	+15	51.2
Banants	(Armenia)	1 July 2013	30 June 2015	67	27	17	23	97	84	+13	40.3
Mosta	(Malta)	2 January 2017	1 April 2017	12	2	1	9	8	35	−27	16.7
Luch-Energiya Vladivostok	(Russia)	6 September 2017	22 December 2017	16	5	7	4	20	19	+1	31.3
Slovan Liberec	(Czech Republic)	1 July 2018	30 June 2019	39	15	10	14	42	35	+7	38.5
Puskás Akadémia	(Hungary)	1 July 2019	Present	206	99	54	53	362	243	+119	48.1
Total				381	169	98	114	582	454	+128	44.4

== Honours ==
=== Player ===
Slovan Bratislava

- Czechoslovak First League: 1991–92
- Slovak Super Liga: 1994–95, 1998–99

1. FC Košice

- Slovak Super Liga: 1996–97

Inter Bratislava

- Slovak Super Liga: 1999–2000, 2000–01
- Slovak Cup: 1999–2000, 2000–01

=== Manager ===
FC Mika

- Armenian Premier League runner-up: 2012–13
- Armenian Supercup: 2012

FC Banats

- Armenian Premier League: 2013–14
- Armenian Supercup: 2014

Individual

- Nemzeti Bajnokság I Manager of the Month: August 2024
