= Viktor Vitályos =

Hungarian footballer (born 2007)

Personal information
- Full name: Viktor Tamás Vitályos
- Date of birth: 18 July 2007 (age 19)
- Place of birth: Budapest, Hungary
- Height: 1.87 m (6 ft 2 in)
- Position: Defender

Team information
- Current team: Sparta Prague
- Number: 15

Youth career
- –2016: Újbuda
- 2016–2021: Ferencvárosi TC
- 2021–2025: Puskás Akadémia

Senior career*
Years	Team	Apps	(Gls)
2023–2025	Puskás Akadémia	0	(0)
2024–2025	→ Puskás Akadémia II (loan)	13	(0)
2025	→ Csákvár (loan)	2	(0)
2025–2026	MTK Budapest	19	(0)
2026–	Sparta Prague	2	(0)

International career^{‡}
2022	Hungary U16	1	(0)
2023–2024	Hungary U17	9	(0)
2024–2025	Hungary U18	4	(0)
2024–2026	Hungary U19	12	(0)
2026–	Hungary U21	3	(0)
- * Club domestic league appearances and goals as of 28 October 2026 ‡ National team caps and goals as of 6 October 2026

Viktor Tamás Vitályos (born 18 July 2007) is a Hungarian professional footballer who plays as a defender for Sparta Prague.

== Club career ==
As a youth player, Vitályos joined the youth academy of Puskás Akadémia, where he played in the UEFA Youth League and was promoted to the club's senior team in 2023, where he made zero league appearances and scored zero goals. Subsequently, he was sent on loan to Csákvár in 2025.

The same year, he signed for MTK Budapest. Ahead of the 2026–27 season, he signed for Czech side Sparta Prague at the age of eighteen. On 11 October 2026, he debuted for the club during a 2–0 home win over Pardubice in the Czech First League.

== International career ==
Vitályos is a Hungary youth international and has represented the country internationally at under-16, under-17, under-19, under-19 and under-21 levels. Altogether, he made one appearance and scored zero goals while playing for the Hungary national under-16 football team.

During the autumn of 2024, he played for the Hungary national under-19 football team for 2025 UEFA European Under-19 Championship qualification. Two years later, he played for the Hungary national under-21 football team for 2027 UEFA European Under-21 Championship qualification.

== Style of play ==
Vitályos plays as a defender and is left-footed. Hungarian news website csakfoci.hu wrote in 2026 that he "is a left-footed defender... who can primarily be used as a left-back, but has also played in the middle".
