= List of Békéscsaba 1912 Előre seasons =

Békéscsaba 1912 Előre is a professional association football club based in Békéscsaba, Hungary.

== Key ==
Nemzeti Bajnokság I

- Pld = Matches played
- W = Matches won
- D = Matches drawn
- L = Matches lost
- GF = Goals for
- GA = Goals against
- Pts = Points
- Pos = Final position

Hungarian football league system

- NBI = Nemzeti Bajnokság I
- NBII = Nemzeti Bajnokság II
- NBIII = Nemzeti Bajnokság III
- MBI = Megyei Bajnokság I

Magyar Kupa

- F = Final
- SF = Semi-finals
- QF = Quarter-finals
- R16 = Round of 16
- R32 = Round of 32
- R64 = Round of 64
- R128 = Round of 128

UEFA

- F = Final
- SF = Semi-finals
- QF = Quarter-finals
- Group = Group stage
- PO = Play-offs
- QR3 = Third qualifying round
- QR2 = Second qualifying round
- QR1 = First qualifying round
- PR = Preliminary round

Winners	Runners-up	Third	Promoted	Relegated

== Seasons ==
Season	League									Cup	UEFA		Manager	Ref
Season	Div.	MP	W	D	L	GF	GA	Pts.	Pos.	Cup	Competition	Result	Manager	
1974–75	NBI	28	6	9	13	24	33	21	14th		Did not qualify		(Hungary) Babolcsay	
1975–76	NBI	30	8	8	14	25	45	24	15th		Did not qualify			
1976–77	NBI	30	9	10	15	40	57	28	13th		Did not qualify		(Hungary) Mészöly	
1977–78	NBI	34	12	7	15	43	57	31	10th		Did not qualify		(Hungary) Mészöly	
1978–79	NBI	34	11	9	14	49	52	31	12th		Did not qualify			
1979–80	NBI	34	10	12	12	54	67	32	14th		Did not qualify			
1980–81	NBI	34	13	10	11	51	48	36	9th		Did not qualify			
1981–82	NBI	34	11	13	10	44	44	35	10th		Did not qualify			
1982–83	NBI	30	5	7	18	41	75	17	16th		Did not qualify			
2006											Did not qualify			
2007–08	NBIII ↑	30	19	6	5	80	31	63	1st		Did not qualify			
2008–09	NBII	30	9	7	14	42	62	34	12th		Did not qualify			
2009–10	NBII	28	7	7	14	31	44	28	13th		Did not qualify			
2010–11	NBII	30	11	10	9	45	40	43	6th	R3	Did not qualify		(Hungary) Pásztor	
2011–12	NBII	30	13	12	5	44	30	51	3rd	QF	Did not qualify		(Hungary) Pásztor	
2012–13	NBII	30	15	10	5	58	38	55	3rd	R16	Did not qualify		(Hungary) Dajka, (Hungary) Pásztor	
2013–14	NBII	30	12	7	11	50	43	43	6th	R32	Did not qualify		(Hungary) Komjáti	
2014–15	NBII ↑	30	18	7	5	42	23	61	2nd	R16	Did not qualify		(Serbia) Spisljak	
2015–16	NBI ↓	33	6	9	18	25	55	27	12th	SF	Did not qualify		(Serbia) Spisljak	
2016–17	NBII	38	19	8	11	64	43	65	5th	R64	Did not qualify		(Serbia) Spisljak, (Hungary) Boér	
2017–18	NBII	38	19	8	11	64	43	65	3rd	QF	Did not qualify		(Hungary) Boér	
2018–19	NBII	38	17	9	12	56	49	60	5th	R32	Did not qualify		(Hungary) Boér	
2019–20^{1}	NBII	26	8	8	10	35	35	32	15th	R16	Did not qualify		(Hungary) Schindler	
2020–21	NBII	38	11	11	16	43	60	44	15th	R64	Did not qualify		(Hungary) Schindler, (Hungary) Preisinger	
2021–22	NBII	38	10	12	16	53	69	42	15th	QF	Did not qualify		(Hungary) Preisinger, (Hungary) Schindler, (Hungary) Brlázs	
2022–23	NBII ↓	38	8	13	17	47	56	37	19th	R16	Did not qualify		(Hungary) Brlázs, (Hungary) Pásztor	
2023–24	NBIII ↑	30	26	3	1	86	21	81	1st	R64	Did not qualify		(Hungary) Csató	

Notes

- Note 1: The 2019-20 Nemzeti Bajnokság II was interrupted by the COVID-19 pandemic.
