= List of Békéscsaba 1912 Előre managers =

Békéscsaba 1912 Előre is a professional football club based in Békéscsaba, Hungary.

== Managers ==
Manager	Nationality	From	To	P	W	D	L	GF	GA	Win	Honours	Notes
Imre Kerekes	Hungary	1963	1964									
Pál Weiner	Hungary	1964										
András Turay	Hungary	1964	1965									
Vilmos Szilasi	Hungary	1965										
György Szombati	Hungary	1965	1967									
Sándor Piller	Hungary	1967	1973									
György Babolcsay	Hungary	1973	1975									
László Szita (interim)	Hungary	1975										
Gyula Szűcs	Hungary	1975	1976									
Kálmán Mészöly	Hungary	1976	1978									
István Ondrik	Hungary	1978	1980									
Károly Marosvölgyi	Hungary	1980	1981									
László Zalai	Hungary	1982	1983									
Tamás Pataki	Hungary	1983	1984									
István Süle	Hungary	1984	1986									
János Csank	Hungary	1986	1989									
Tibor Vígh	Hungary	1989	1991									
József Pásztor	Hungary	29 May 1991	30 June 1996	135	54	45	36	218	164			
Silviu Iorgulescu	Romania	1996										
Gyula Bozai	Hungary	1997										
József Pásztor (2nd spell)	Hungary	15 June 1997	30 June 2000	34	7	10	17	28	61			
Sándor Paróczai	Hungary	2000										
Attila Vágó	Hungary	2000	2001									
László Dajka	Hungary	2001										
József Pásztor	Hungary	13 December 2001	23 August 2002									
Gábor Sikesdi (interim)	Hungary	2002										
Lajos Garamvölgyi	Hungary	2002	2003									
Attila Supka	Hungary	2003	2004									
Attila Vágó	Hungary	2004										
Péter Jakab (caretaker)	Hungary	2004										
László Dajka (2nd spell)	Hungary	2004	2005									
János Pajkos	Hungary	2005										
Péter Jakab	Hungary	2005	2005									
Sándor Csató	Hungary	2006	2007									
János Szarvas	Hungary	2007	2008									
János Kiss	Hungary	2008	2009									
Attila Belvon	Hungary	2009	2010									
József Pásztor	Hungary	20 April 2010	9 June 2012	67	26	24	17	98	83			
László Dajka	Hungary	2012	2013									
József Pásztor	Hungary	2 April 2013	31 May 2014	39	17	10	12	66	51			
András Komjáti	Hungary	2013	2014									
Zoran Spišljak	Serbia	1 July 2014	24 March 2017	98	40	23	25	121	121			
Gábor Boér	Hungary	24 March 2017	20 March 2019	99	51	20	28	162	110			
Szabolcs Schindler	Hungary	4 June 2019	8 September 2020	38	14	12	12	47	47			
József Pásztor (caretaker)	Hungary	9 September 2020	15 September 2020	1	1	0	0	2	0			
Sándor Preisinger	Hungary	16 September 2020	7 September 2021	37	8	9	20	42	69			
Szabolcs Schindler	Hungary	9 September 2021	18 April 2022	31	11	9	11	53	55			
Gábor Brlázs	Hungary	23 April 2022	13 April 2023	39	10	11	18	52	60			
József Pásztor (caretaker)	Hungary	14 April 2023	11 June 2023	6	2	1	3	8	8			
Sándor Csató	Hungary	2023										
