= History of Kispest-Honvéd FC =

Kispest-Honvéd Football Club is a professional football club based in Budapest, Hungary.

== 1900s ==
The club was founded on 10 August 1908 as Kispesti Atlétikai Club – Athletic Club of Kispest by Dr. Bálint Varga, a teacher. However the club's earliest members could not agree on a club constitution until 3 August 1909 and this is generally recognised as the club's foundation date. When the club was originally formed, Kispest was still a village, distinct from the city of Budapest.

== 1920s ==
During the first three decades of its existence, the club was little more than a village team and enjoyed only moderate success, winning a single Hungarian Cup in 1926.

On 8 December 1926 the first match of the 1925–26 Magyar Kupa final was played between Kispesti AC and Budapesti EAC. The match ended with a 1–1 draw at the Hungária körúti Stadion. On 19 December 1926 Kispesti AC beat Budapesti EAC 3–2 in the third repeated final of the 1925–26 Magyar Kupa final at the Postás pálya. The third Kispest goal came in the 157th minute by Győző Gregor.

During the 1930s the team included Rezső Rozgonyi and Rezső Somlai who both represented Hungary at the 1934 World Cup and Ferenc Puskás I, the father of Ferenc Puskás, and later a coach at the club during the 1940s.

== 1940s ==
In 1943 both Ferenc Puskás and József Bozsik made their debut for Kispest FC. Between 1947 and 1948 the club was coached by the legendary Hungarian coach Béla Guttman. In November 1948, Guttmann attempted to take off fullback Mihály Patyi at whose play he was furious, leaving the team with 10 players. Encouraged by his team captain, Ferenc Puskás Jr, Patyi remained on the pitch. Guttman retired to the stands, refusing to coach the team, quitting on the spot. This was his final game in charge of the team, and he departed soon after the falling out.

The club's golden age really began in 1949 when it was taken over by the Hungarian Ministry of Defence and it became the Hungarian Army team. The man behind the take-over was Gusztáv Sebes, the coach of the national team. Sebes was inspired by the Austrian Wunderteam and the Italy team that won two World Cups in the 1930s. Both teams were predominantly drawn from one or at most two clubs and Sebes wanted a similar system in Hungary.

In January 1949 when Hungary became a communist state, the resulting nationalisation of football clubs gave Sebes the opportunity. The two biggest Hungarian clubs at the time were Ferencvárosi TC and MTK Hungária FC. However while the secret police, the ÁVH took over MTK, Ferencváros was considered unsuitable because of its right-wing and nationalist traditions. Sebes turned instead to Kispesti AC. The Kispest name was dropped as the village was absorbed into District XIX of Budapest and the club was renamed Budapesti Honvéd SE. The name derives from Honvédség, the name of the Hungarian Army, and the word honvéd, which literally means defender of the homeland is also used to refer to an army private.

== The Mighty Magyars ==
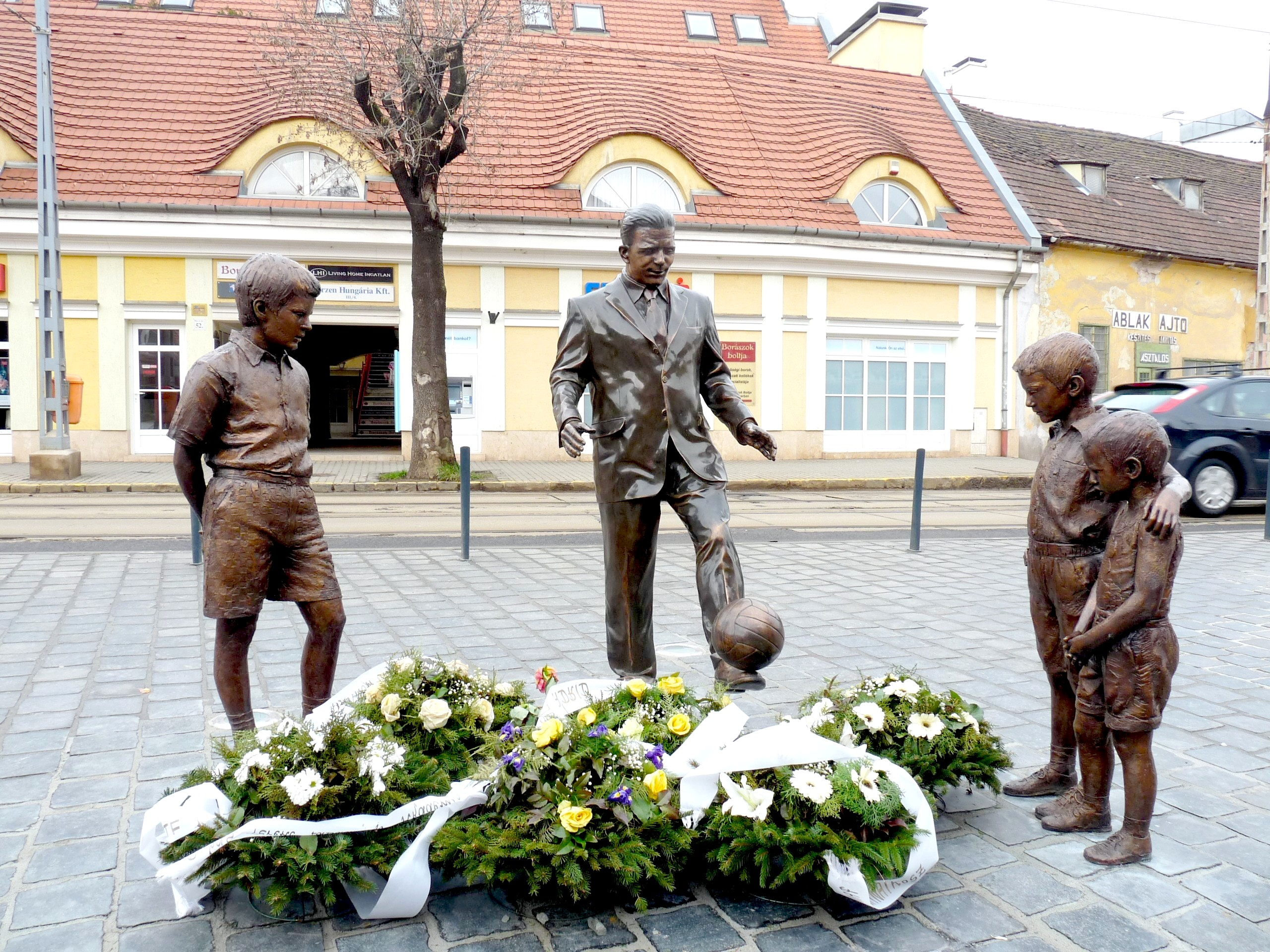
Statue of Ferenc Puskás in Budapest inspired by a photograph taken in Madrid in which the legendary player was teaching an ad hoc course in keepie uppie to street children.

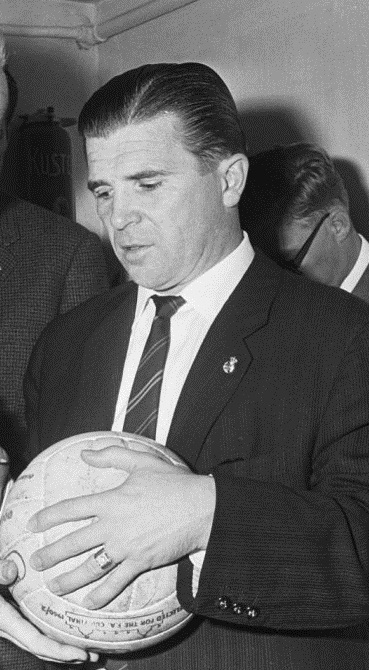
Ferenc Puskás scored 352 goals in 341 matches for Budapest Honvéd

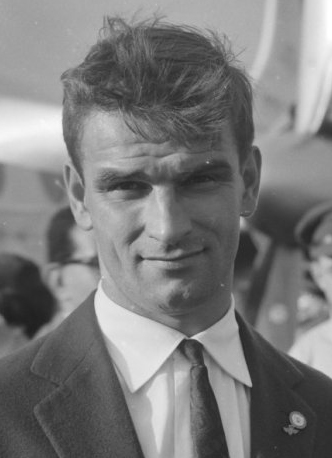
Sándor Kocsis played for the club between 1950-57

The Kispest AC team already included Ferenc Puskás and József Bozsik but army conscription now enabled Honvéd to recruit Sándor Kocsis, Zoltán Czibor and László Budai from Ferencváros, Gyula Lóránt from Vasas SC and the goalkeeper Gyula Grosics. Sebes was effectively able to use Honvéd as a training camp for the national team. During the early 1950s these Honvéd players formed the backbone of the legendary Mighty Magyars, helping Hungary become Olympic Champions in 1952, Central European Champions in 1953, defeat England twice and reach the 1954 World Cup final.

== European Cup ==
Honvéd itself also benefited, winning the Hungarian League in 1949–50, 1950, 1952, 1954, and 1955. The club's reputation spread beyond Hungary and on 13 December 1954 they played Wolverhampton Wanderers, the reigning English League champions, in a prestige friendly. Honvéd were leading 2–0 at half-time, but eventually lost 3–2. They also played, and lost to, Red Star Belgrade (then 7th in the Yugoslav league). It was games like this that led to establishment of the European Cup in 1955.

In 1956 Honvéd qualified for the second European Cup competition and in the first round they were drawn against Athletic Bilbao. Honvéd lost the away leg 2–3, but before the home leg could be played, the Hungarian Revolution had collapsed back in Budapest and the Soviet Union had invaded. The players decided against going back to Hungary and arranged for the return game with Athletic to be played at the Heysel Stadium in Brussels. However, early in the game the Honvéd goalkeeper was injured and, with no substitutes permitted, Zoltán Czibor had to go into goal. Despite drawing 3–3 they went out 6–5 on aggregate.

== Honvéd World Tour ==
In 1954 Honvéd faced Wolverhampton Wanderers at Molineux Stadium in one of the first floodlit matches. Elimination from the 1956–57 European Cup left Honvéd in limbo. The players, declining to return to Hungary, summoned their families from Budapest and, despite opposition from FIFA and the then Soviet-controlled Hungarian Football Federation, Béla Guttmann organised a fundraising tour of Italy, Portugal, and Spain. Among the most notable matches were a 5–5 draw with a Madrid XI and a 4–3 win over CF Barcelona. Honvéd declined a Mexican offer of political asylum and an invitation to join their national league and instead accepted an offer to play in a tournament in Brazil with CR Flamengo and Botafogo. By now FIFA had declared the team illegal and banned them from using the Honvéd name. After returning to Europe, the players parted ways. Some, including József Bozsik, László Budai, Gyula Lóránt and Gyula Grosics, returned to Hungary while others, including Zoltán Czibor, Sándor Kocsis and Ferenc Puskás, found new clubs in Western Europe. Czibor and Kocsis eventually signed for FC Barcelona while Puskás joined Real Madrid.

== The Post-Revolution era ==
The defection of Zoltán Czibor, Sándor Kocsis and Ferenc Puskás severely weakened Honvéd and in 1957 they only avoided relegation after the Hungarian Football Federation decide to expand the first division. Despite the emergence of Lajos Tichy and Lajos Kocsis, the post-Revolution era was not kind to Honvéd. There only successes came in the Mitropa Cup in 1959, when they beat MTK Hungária FC in the final 6–5 on aggregate, and in 1964 when they won the Hungarian Cup.

== The Second Golden Age ==
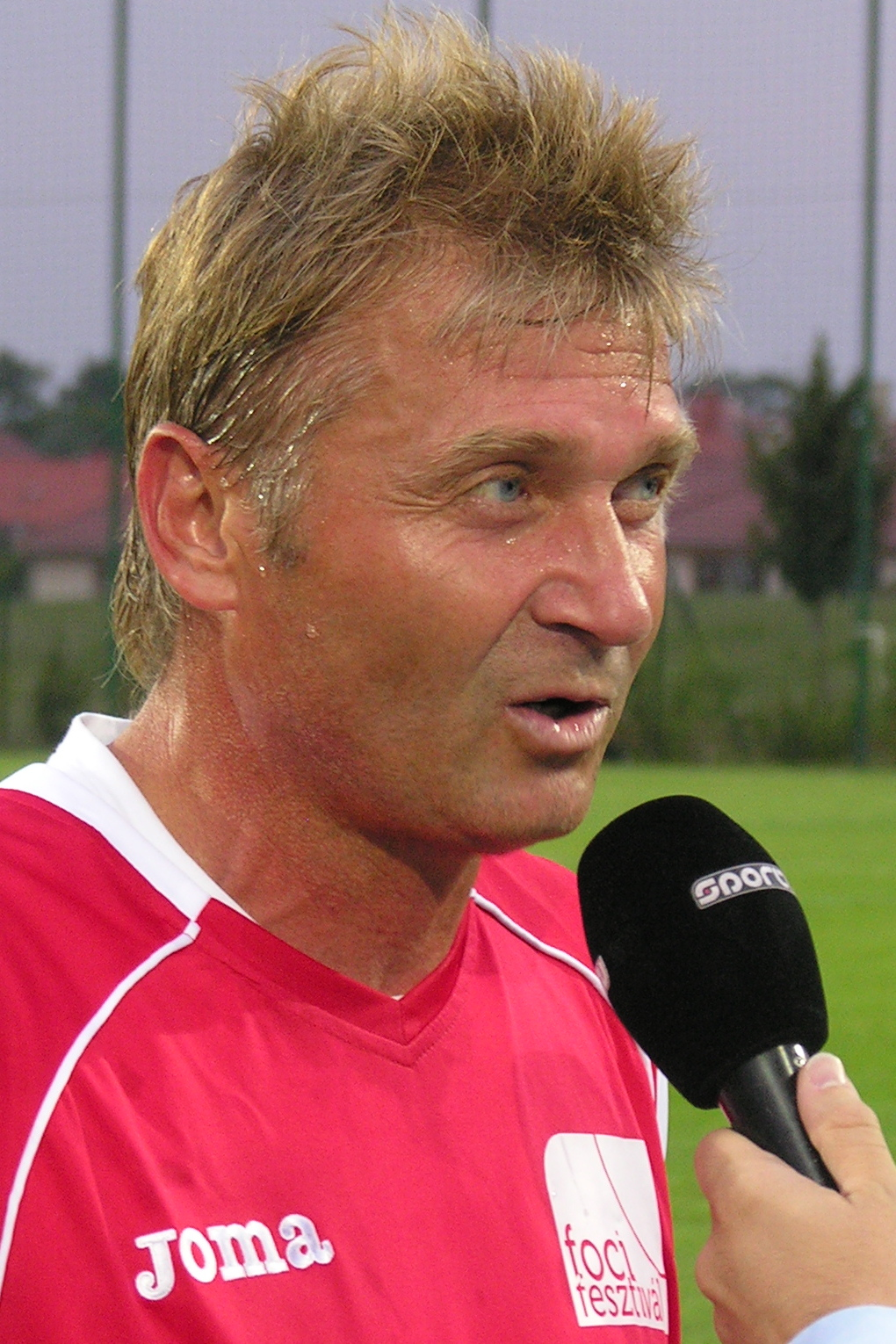
Lajos Détári became top-scorer three times

In 1980 with Lajos Tichy as coach and a squad that included Imre Garaba, Honvéd won their first Hungarian League title in twenty five years. During the 1980s and early 1990s players such as Kálmán Kovács, Lajos Détári, Béla Illés, Gábor Halmai and István Vincze helped Honvéd win another seven titles. They also won league and cup doubles in 1985 and 1989 and won the Hungarian Cup and in 1996.

== Kispest Honvéd FC ==
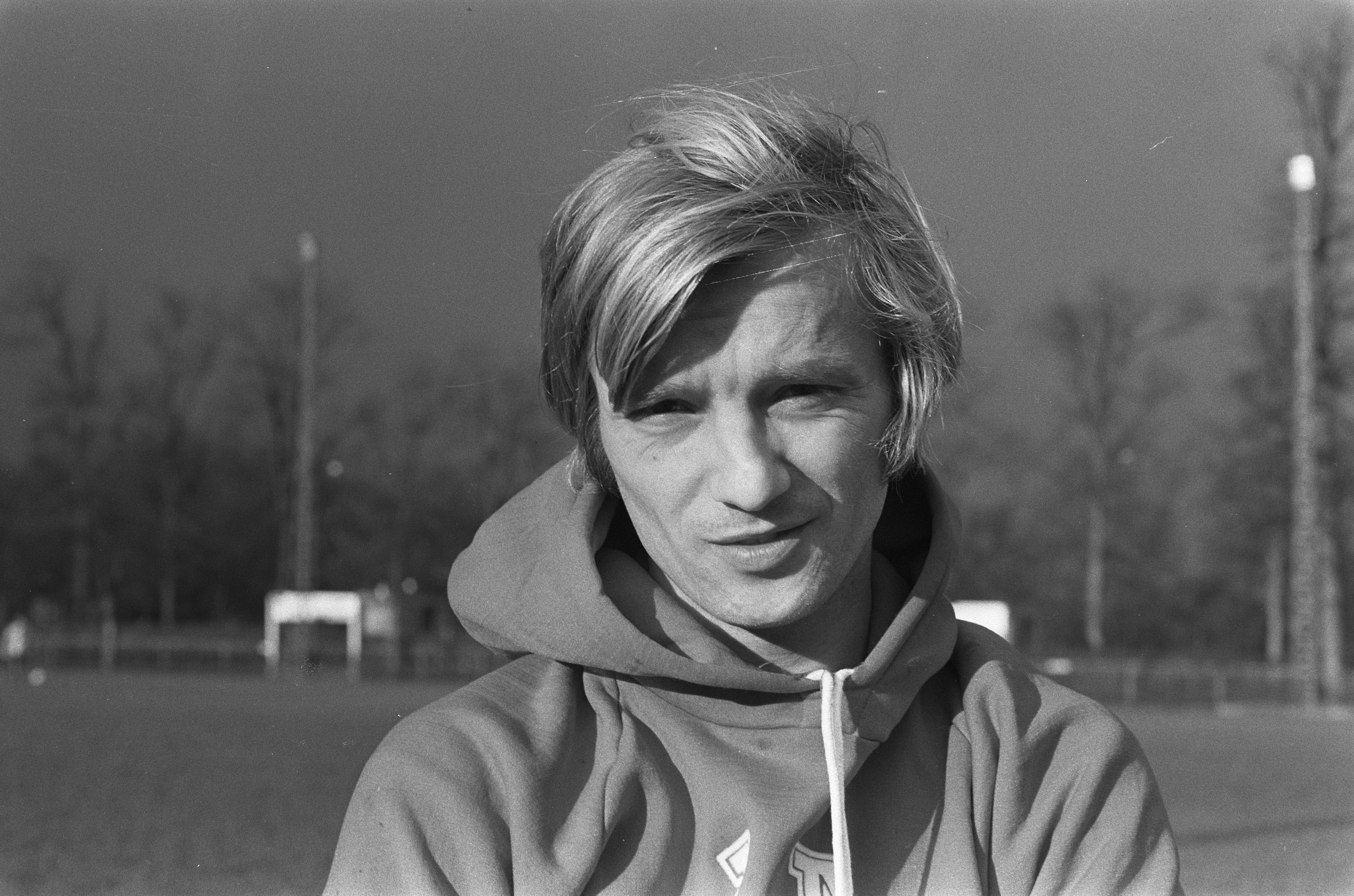
Ferencváros legend Zoltán Varga managed Budapest Honvéd in 1997

In 1991 the club revived the Kispest name and became Kispest Honvéd FC. However the name change marked the beginning of a decline in the club's fortunes. In 2003 they were relegated, but they returned to the first division the following season. However, Kispest Honvéd Sports Circle Ltd, the company that owned the club, owed millions of Hungarian forints in taxes and in October 2004 went into liquidation. The company practised a policy that treated its players as self-employed contractors rather than employees and as result, significantly reduced the club's tax burden. However, the tax authorities objected and were supported by the courts, leaving the club in arrears with no means of paying them. Rival directors argued over who owed how much tax and eventually the Hungarian League intervened. As a result, a new club, Budapest Honvéd FC, was formed and allowed to take the place of Kispest Honvéd FC in the first division on the condition that the tax debt was paid off.

In August 2007 the fences in front of the stands were removed at the Bozsik József Stadion signalling a new dawn for Hungarian football. Also in 2007, Mihály Tóth returned from Fredrikstad FK and signed a three-year contract with the club.

In the UEFA Cup 2007-08 season Honvéd faced with the Moldovan Nistru Otaci in the first round of the qualifiers. In the first leg Honvéd drew 1–1 away, and at home the result was the same. In the penalty-shootout Honvéd won 5–4. In the second round Honvéd played with the German Hamburger SV. In the first leg Honvéd drew 0–0, while away in the Imtech Arena, in Hamburg they were beaten by 4–0.

In the Intertoto Cup 2008 Honvéd played with the Kazakh Zhetysu and won both legs. The final result was 2–1 away, while at home Honvéd won 4–2. In the second round Honvéd played with the Czech Teplice and won 3–1 away, while lost 2–0 at home. As a consequence, Honvéd won on away goals. In the third round the team played with the Austrian Sturm Graz. The first leg finished goalless in Graz, Austria. Both teams made a stand against racism and discrimination. The second match was won by Sturm, therefore Honvéd was eliminated from the Intertoto Cup.

In the 2008-09 Magyar Kupa season Honvéd played in the final against Győri ETO FC. In the first leg Honvéd won 1–0 in Győr, while the second leg finished goalless which resulted the triumph of the team on 1–0 aggregate. As a consequence the team could play in the Europa League.

In the 2009-10 Europa League season Honvéd entered the third round. Honvéd played with the Turkish Fenerbahçe. The first match was won by Fenerbahçe by 5–1, while at home the result was 1–1. The team was eliminated on 6–2 aggregate.

== 2010s ==
Although Honved finished fourth in the 2011–12 season of the Hungarian League, they could participate in the UEFA Europa League 2012–13 season because Győr were banned from any European competitions. Honved faced with bronze medal winner of the Albanian First Division Flamurtari Vlorë in the first round of the Europa League. The first leg was won by Honved 1–0 away. Honved won the second leg as well by beating the Albanian club by 2–0 at home. In the second round, they faced Russian Premier League club Anzhi Makhachkala, featuring star players Roberto Carlos and Samuel Eto'o. The first leg of the match was played near the Russian capital, Moscow in Ramenskoye in the stadium of FC Saturn Moscow since UEFA did not allow the match to be played in Dagestan. Anzhi won the match by 1–0.

In 2011, Cordella was appointed the sporting director of Budapest Honved FC. He had signed a five years contract with the team which expired in 2016.

Although Honvéd were not the highest-spending club in the Hungarian Championship 2016-17 Nemzeti Bajnokság I, they won their 14th title, mostly on the backs of an exceptional youth program and stable management, ending a 24-year dearth. Honvéd also qualified for the 2017-18 UEFA Champions League season.

The club won the 2019-20 Magyar Kupa season by beating Mezőkövesd SE in the final 2–1 at the Puskás Aréna on 3 June 2020.

== 2020s ==
On 27 May 2023, Honvéd lost 2-1 to Puskás Akadémia FC at the Pancho Aréna, Felcsút on the 33rd match day of the 2022–23 Nemzeti Bajnokság I season, while Vasas SC drew with Fehérvár FC that resulted in the relegation to the Nemzeti Bajnokság II.

On 31 October 2023, Máté Pinezits was sacked due to negative performance

On 17 December 2024, Zsolt Laczkó was sacked since the club were at the last position in the 2024–25 Nemzeti Bajnokság II season. Laczkó-led Honvéd could win twice, drew three times, and lost six times in the league.

On 19 December 2024, Tamás Feczkó was appointed as the manager of the club.

On 3 May 2026, a goalless draw with Szeged-Csanád Grosics Akadémia was enough for Honvéd to be promoted to the first division. Although Feczkó-led Honvéd managed to get promoted to the first division, he was sacked at the end of the season, on 22 May 2026. The supporters of the club organized a protest against the club's decision to remove Feczkó from his position.
