= List of Puskás Akadémia FC seasons =

Puskás Akadémia Football Club is a professional Hungarian football club based in Felcsút, Hungary.

== Key ==
Nemzeti Bajnokság I

- Pld = Matches played
- W = Matches won
- D = Matches drawn
- L = Matches lost
- GF = Goals for
- GA = Goals against
- Pts = Points
- Pos = Final position

Hungarian football league system

- NBI = Nemzeti Bajnokság I
- NBII = Nemzeti Bajnokság II
- NBIII = Nemzeti Bajnokság III
- MBI = Megyei Bajnokság I

Magyar Kupa

- F = Final
- SF = Semi-finals
- QF = Quarter-finals
- R16 = Round of 16
- R32 = Round of 32
- R64 = Round of 64
- R128 = Round of 128

UEFA

- F = Final
- SF = Semi-finals
- QF = Quarter-finals
- Group = Group stage
- PO = Play-offs
- QR3 = Third qualifying round
- QR2 = Second qualifying round
- QR1 = First qualifying round
- PR = Preliminary round

Winners	Runners-up	Third	Promoted	Relegated

== Seasons ==
As of 13 September 2025.

Season	League										Cup	UEFA		Manager	Ref.
Season	Tier	Div.	Pld	W	D	L	GF	GA	Pts.	Pos.	Cup	Competition	Result	Manager	Ref.
2012–13	2	NB II ↑	30	21	7	2	57	18	70	1st	?	Did not qualify		(Hungary)	
2013–14	1	NB I	30	8	7	15	36	51	31	14th	R32	Did not qualify		(Hungary) Benczés	
2014–15	1	NB I	30	10	5	15	35	40	35	10th	R32	Did not qualify			
2015–16	1	NB I ↓	33	7	10	16	35	51	31	11th	R64	Did not qualify		(Croatia) Jarni, (Hungary) Szijjártó	
2016–17	2	NB II ↑	38	22	11	5	67	39	77	1st	R32	Did not qualify		(Hungary) Szijjártó, (Hungary) Pintér	
2017–18	1	NB I	33	11	10	12	41	46	43	6th	R	Did not qualify		(Hungary) Pintér	
2018–19	1	NB I	33	11	7	15	36	45	40	7th	QF	Did not qualify		(Hungary) Benczés, (Germany) Radoki, (Hungary) Komjáti	
2019–20	1	NB I	33	14	12	7	52	41	54	3rd	QF	Did not qualify		(Slovakia) Hornyák	
2020–21	1	NB I	33	18	4	11	52	42	58	2nd	R16	Europa League	1QR	(Slovakia) Hornyák	
2021–22	1	NB I	33	14	12	7	43	34	54	3rd	R32	Conference League	2QR	(Slovakia) Hornyák	
2022–23	1	NB I	33	14	11	8	48	42	53	4th		Conference League	2QR	(Slovakia) Hornyák	
2023–24	1	NB I	33	15	10	8	60	35	55	3rd	R64	Did not qualify		(Slovakia) Hornyák	
2024–25	1	NB I	33	20	6	7	58	38	66	2nd	R16	Conference League	PO	(Slovakia) Hornyák	
2025–26	1	NB I	6	3	1	2	10	10	10	4th	R64	Conference League	2QR	(Slovakia) Hornyák	
