= List of Puskás Akadémia FC managers =

Puskás Akadémia FC is a professional football club based in Felcsút, Hungary.

== Managers ==
As of 8 September 2024.

Manager	Nationality	From	To	P	W	D	L	GF	GA	Win	Honours	Notes
Miklós Benczés	Hungary	1 July 2012	1 July 2015	39	13	6	20					
Robert Jarni	Croatia	8 June 2015	16 April 2016	30	5	10	15	32	49			
István Szíjjártó	Hungary	17 April 2016	1 November 2016	3	2	0	1					
István Vincze	Hungary	2 November 2016	22 December 2016	6	4	1	1	11	6			
Attila Pintér	Hungary	12 December 2016	4 June 2018	42	16	11	15					
Miklós Benczés	Hungary	7 June 2018	9 December 2018	20	8	3	9					
András Komjáti (interim)	Hungary	8 December 2018	28 December 2018	1	1	0	0	2	0			
János Radoki	Germany	19 December 2018	7 April 2019	13	4	2	7					
András Komjáti (interim)	Hungary	7 April 2019	20 May 2019	6	2	4	0	6	4			
Zsolt Hornyák	Slovakia Hungary	7 June 2019	1 June 2026	270	128	67	75	457	328			
