= 2016–17 2. Bundesliga =

43rd season of the second-tier football league in Germany

2. Bundesliga
- Season: 2016–17
- Champions: VfB Stuttgart
- Promoted: VfB Stuttgart; Hannover 96
- Relegated: 1860 Munich (to RL Bayern); Würzburger Kickers; Karlsruher SC
- Matches: 306
- Goals: 758 (2.48 per match)
- Top goalscorer: Simon Terodde (25 goals)
- Best goalkeeper: Philipp Tschauner (16 clean sheets)
- Biggest home win: Bielefeld 6−0 Braunschweig
- Biggest away win: Kaiserslautern 0−4 Hannover; Aue 0−4 Stuttgart
- Highest scoring: Bochum 5−4 Nürnberg
- Longest winning run: 6 games Union Berlin
- Longest unbeaten run: 11 games Hannover 96
- Longest winless run: 16 games Würzburger Kickers
- Longest losing run: 4 games Erzgebirge Aue; Greuther Fürth; Karlsruher SC; 1860 Munich; 1. FC Nürnberg; FC St. Pauli
- Highest attendance: 60,000; Stuttgart v St. Pauli
- Lowest attendance: 4,721; Sandhausen v Braunschweig
- Average attendance: 21,732

The 2016–17 2. Bundesliga was the 43rd season of the 2. Bundesliga. It commenced on 5 August 2016 and ended on 21 May 2017. Fixtures for the 2016–17 season were announced on 29 June 2016.

== Teams ==
A total of 18 teams participate in the 2016–17 2. Bundesliga. These include 14 teams from the 2015–16 2. Bundesliga, together with two automatically relegated teams from the 2015–16 Bundesliga, and two automatically promoted teams from the 2015–16 3. Liga. The 16th-placed Bundesliga and third-placed team of the 2. Bundesliga and the 16th-placed 2. Bundesliga team and the third-place finisher in the 3. Liga participated in promotion-relegation playoffs.

Locations of the 2016–17 2. Bundesliga teams

On 16 April 2016, Dynamo Dresden won promotion from the 2015–16 3. Liga. Aue followed on 7 May 2016. On 8 May 2016, SC Paderborn was relegated to 2016–17 3. Liga. On 15 May 2016, FSV Frankfurt followed. 1. FC Nürnberg lost its playoff 2–1 on aggregate and remained in the league. Finally MSV Duisburg, 16th-placed team of the 2. Bundesliga lost to Würzburger Kickers, third of the 3. Liga, 4–1 on aggregate in a relegation playoff. Würzburg returned to the second level after 38 years via their second consecutive promotion; Duisburg returned immediately to the third level.

=== Stadiums and locations ===
Team	Location	Stadium	Capacity
1860 Munich	Munich	Allianz Arena	75,000
Arminia Bielefeld	Bielefeld	Schüco-Arena	27,300
VfL Bochum	Bochum	Vonovia-Ruhrstadion	29,299
Eintracht Braunschweig	Braunschweig	Eintracht-Stadion	23,325
Dynamo Dresden	Dresden	DDV-Stadion	32,066
Fortuna Düsseldorf	Düsseldorf	Esprit Arena	54,600
Erzgebirge Aue	Aue	Sparkassen-Erzgebirgsstadion	15,711
SpVgg Greuther Fürth	Fürth	Sportpark Ronhof	18,500
Hannover 96	Hanover	HDI-Arena	49,200
1. FC Heidenheim	Heidenheim	Voith-Arena	15,000
1. FC Kaiserslautern	Kaiserslautern	Fritz-Walter-Stadion	49,780
Karlsruher SC	Karlsruhe	Wildparkstadion	29,699
1. FC Nürnberg	Nuremberg	Grundig-Stadion	50,000
SV Sandhausen	Sandhausen	Hardtwald	12,100
FC St. Pauli	Hamburg	Millerntor-Stadion	29,546
VfB Stuttgart	Stuttgart	Mercedes-Benz Arena	60,469
Union Berlin	Berlin	Alte Försterei	22,012
Würzburger Kickers	Würzburg	Flyeralarm Arena	14,500

=== Personnel and kits ===
Team	Manager	Captain	Kit manufacturer	Shirt sponsor
1860 Munich	(Portugal) Vítor Pereira	(Germany) Stefan Aigner	Macron	Die Bayerische
1. FC Nürnberg	(Germany) Michael Köllner	(Slovenia) Mišo Brečko	Umbro	Nürnberger Versicherung
Arminia Bielefeld	(Luxembourg) Jeff Saibene	(Germany) Fabian Klos	Saller	Schüco
VfL Bochum	(Netherlands) Gertjan Verbeek	(Germany) Patrick Fabian	Nike	Booster Energy Drink (H) / Netto (A)
Eintracht Braunschweig	(Germany) Torsten Lieberknecht	(Portugal) Marcel Correia	Nike	SEAT
Dynamo Dresden	(Germany) Uwe Neuhaus	(Germany) Marco Hartmann	Erima	Feldschlößchen
Fortuna Düsseldorf	(Germany) Friedhelm Funkel	(Germany) Oliver Fink	Puma	o.tel.o
Erzgebirge Aue	(Germany) Domenico Tedesco	(Germany) Martin Männel	Nike	WätaS Wärmetauscher Sachsen
SpVgg Greuther Fürth	(Hungary) Janos Radoki	(Germany) Marco Caligiuri	Hummel	Ergo Direkt Versicherungen
Hannover 96	(Germany) André Breitenreiter	(Germany) Manuel Schmiedebach	Jako	Heinz von Heiden
1. FC Heidenheim	(Germany) Frank Schmidt	(Germany) Marc Schnatterer	Nike	Hartmann Gruppe
1. FC Kaiserslautern	(Germany) Norbert Meier	(Germany) Daniel Halfar	Uhlsport	Top12.de
Karlsruher SC	(Germany) Marc-Patrick Meister	(Germany) Enrico Valentini	Jako	Klaiber Markisen
SV Sandhausen	(Turkey) Kenan Kocak	(Austria) Stefan Kulovits	Puma	Verivox
FC St. Pauli	(Germany) Ewald Lienen	(Germany) Lasse Sobiech	Under Armour	Congstar
VfB Stuttgart	(Germany) Hannes Wolf	(Germany) Christian Gentner	Puma	Mercedes-Benz Bank
1. FC Union Berlin	(Germany) Jens Keller	(Germany) Felix Kroos	Macron	Layenberger
Würzburger Kickers	(Germany) Bernd Hollerbach	(Germany) Sebastian Neumann	Capelli	s.Oliver

=== Managerial changes ===
Team	Outgoing manager	Manner of departure	Date of vacancy	Position in table	Incoming manager	Date of appointment
Karlsruher SC	(Germany) Markus Kauczinski	Resigned	30 June 2016	Preseason	(Germany) Tomas Oral	1 July 2016
Union Berlin	(Germany) André Hofschneider	End of interim	30 June 2016	Preseason	(Germany) Jens Keller	1 July 2016
1860 Munich	(Russia) Denis Bushuev	End of interim	30 June 2016	Preseason	(Croatia) Kosta Runjaić	1 July 2016
VfB Stuttgart	(Germany) Jürgen Kramny	Demoted to U23 team	30 June 2016	Preseason	(Netherlands) Jos Luhukay	1 July 2016
1. FC Kaiserslautern	(Germany) Konrad Fünfstück	Sacked	30 June 2016	Preseason	(Turkey) Tayfun Korkut	1 July 2016
Arminia Bielefeld	(Germany) Norbert Meier	Signed by SV Darmstadt 98	30 June 2016	Preseason	(Germany) Rüdiger Rehm	1 July 2016
1. FC Nürnberg	(Switzerland) René Weiler	Signed by R.S.C. Anderlecht	30 June 2016	Preseason	(Germany) Alois Schwartz	1 July 2016
SV Sandhausen	(Germany) Alois Schwartz	Signed by 1. FC Nürnberg	30 June 2016	Preseason	(Turkey) Kenan Kocak	3 July 2016
VfB Stuttgart	(Netherlands) Jos Luhukay	Resigned	20 September 2016	2nd	(Germany) Hannes Wolf	20 September 2016
Arminia Bielefeld	(Germany) Rüdiger Rehm	Sacked	22 October 2016	18th	(Germany) Jürgen Kramny	15 November 2016
SpVgg Greuther Fürth	(Germany) Stefan Ruthenbeck	Sacked	21 November 2016	13th	(Hungary) Janos Radoki	21 November 2016
1860 Munich	(Croatia) Kosta Runjaić	Sacked	22 November 2016	14th	(Portugal) Vítor Pereira	1 January 2017
Karlsruher SC	(Germany) Tomas Oral	Sacked	4 December 2016	15th	(Germany) Mirko Slomka	3 January 2017
1. FC Kaiserslautern	(Turkey) Tayfun Korkut	Resigned	27 December 2016	13th	(Germany) Norbert Meier	4 January 2017
Erzgebirge Aue	(Bulgaria) Pavel Dochev	Resigned	28 February 2017	18th	(Germany) Domenico Tedesco	8 March 2017
1. FC Nürnberg	(Germany) Alois Schwartz	Sacked	7 March 2017	11th	(Germany) Michael Köllner	7 March 2017
Arminia Bielefeld	(Germany) Jürgen Kramny	Sacked	14 March 2017	18th	(Luxembourg) Jeff Saibene	19 March 2017
Hannover 96	(Germany) Daniel Stendel	Sacked	20 March 2017	4th	(Germany) André Breitenreiter	20 March 2017
Karlsruher SC	(Germany) Mirko Slomka	Sacked	4 April 2017	18th	(Germany) Marc-Patrick Meister	4 April 2017

== League table ==
Pos	Team	Pld	W	D	L	GF	GA	GD	Pts	Promotion, qualification or relegation
1	VfB Stuttgart (C, P)	34	21	6	7	63	37	+26	69	Promotion to Bundesliga
2	Hannover 96 (P)	34	19	10	5	51	32	+19	67	Promotion to Bundesliga
3	Eintracht Braunschweig	34	19	9	6	50	36	+14	66	Qualification for promotion play-offs
4	Union Berlin	34	18	6	10	51	39	+12	60	
5	Dynamo Dresden	34	13	11	10	53	46	+7	50	
6	1. FC Heidenheim	34	12	10	12	43	39	+4	46	
7	FC St. Pauli	34	12	9	13	39	35	+4	45	
8	Greuther Fürth	34	12	9	13	33	40	−7	45	
9	VfL Bochum	34	10	14	10	42	47	−5	44	
10	SV Sandhausen	34	10	12	12	41	36	+5	42	
11	Fortuna Düsseldorf	34	10	12	12	37	39	−2	42	
12	1. FC Nürnberg	34	12	6	16	46	52	−6	42	
13	1. FC Kaiserslautern	34	10	11	13	29	33	−4	41	
14	Erzgebirge Aue	34	10	9	15	37	52	−15	39	
15	Arminia Bielefeld	34	8	13	13	50	54	−4	37	
16	1860 Munich (Note: 1860 Munich, who lost in the relegation play-offs, were unable to obtain a license for the 2017–18 3. Liga. Therefore, 1860 Munich was relegated to the Regionalliga Bayern.) (R)	34	10	6	18	37	47	−10	36	Qualification for relegation play-offs
17	Würzburger Kickers (R)	34	7	13	14	32	41	−9	34	Relegation to 3. Liga
18	Karlsruher SC (R)	34	5	10	19	27	56	−29	25	Relegation to 3. Liga

Source: DFB
Rules for classification: 1) Points; 2) Goal difference; 3) Goals scored
(C) Champions; (P) Promoted; (R) Relegated

== Results ==
Home \ Away	AUE	UNB	DSC	BOC	EBS	SGD	F95	SGF	H96	FCH	FCK	KSC	M60	FCN	SVS	STP	VFB	FCW
Erzgebirge Aue	—	1–3	1–1	2–4	0–2	1–4	0–0	0–0	2–2	2–1	1–0	1–0	3–0	1–2	2–0	1–0	0–4	3–1
Union Berlin	0–1	—	3–1	2–1	2–0	2–2	0–1	1–1	2–1	0–1	3–1	4–0	2–0	1–0	2–1	2–0	1–1	2–0
Arminia Bielefeld	2–2	4–4	—	1–0	6–0	1–2	2–1	1–1	3–3	2–1	2–0	0–0	2–1	1–3	1–0	1–1	2–3	0–1
VfL Bochum	1–1	2–1	1–1	—	1–1	4–2	1–2	1–0	1–1	2–1	0–0	1–1	1–0	5–4	2–2	1–3	1–1	2–1
Eintracht Braunschweig	1–1	3–1	3–2	2–0	—	1–0	2–1	1–0	2–2	3–2	1–0	2–1	2–1	6–1	2–1	1–2	1–1	2–1
Dynamo Dresden	0–3	0–0	1–1	2–2	3–2	—	1–1	2–1	1–2	2–1	3–3	0–0	1–2	1–1	2–0	1–0	5–0	2–2
Fortuna Düsseldorf	1–0	2–2	4–0	3–0	1–2	0–3	—	1–1	2–2	0–0	1–1	1–1	0–1	0–2	0–3	1–3	1–0	1–1
Greuther Fürth	3–2	1–2	2–1	2–1	0–0	1–0	1–0	—	4–1	0–2	0–1	0–1	1–0	1–0	1–1	0–2	1–0	0–3
Hannover 96	2–0	2–0	2–2	2–1	1–0	0–2	1–0	3–1	—	3–2	1–0	1–0	1–0	1–0	0–0	2–0	1–0	3–1
1. FC Heidenheim	1–0	3–0	2–2	0–0	1–1	0–0	2–0	0–2	0–2	—	3–0	2–1	2–1	2–3	2–2	2–0	1–2	1–2
1. FC Kaiserslautern	0–0	1–0	0–0	3–0	0–1	3–0	0–0	2–0	0–4	1–1	—	0–0	1–0	1–0	3–0	1–2	0–1	1–0
Karlsruher SC	2–0	1–2	3–2	1–1	0–0	3–4	0–3	1–2	2–0	0–1	1–3	—	0–0	0–3	1–3	1–1	1–3	1–1
1860 Munich	6–2	1–2	1–0	1–2	0–1	1–0	1–3	2–1	0–2	1–1	1–1	2–1	—	2–0	1–1	1–2	1–1	2–1
1. FC Nürnberg	2–1	2–0	1–0	0–1	1–1	1–2	2–3	1–2	2–0	1–1	2–1	2–1	1–2	—	1–3	0–2	2–3	2–2
SV Sandhausen	2–0	0–1	1–3	0–0	0–1	2–0	2–2	1–1	1–1	0–0	2–0	4–0	3–2	0–1	—	3–0	1–2	0–0
FC St. Pauli	1–2	1–2	2–1	1–1	0–2	2–0	0–1	1–1	0–0	3–0	0–0	5–0	2–2	1–1	0–0	—	0–1	1–0
VfB Stuttgart	3–0	3–1	3–1	1–1	2–0	3–3	2–0	4–0	1–2	1–2	2–0	2–0	2–1	3–1	2–1	2–1	—	4–1
Würzburger Kickers	1–1	0–1	1–1	2–0	1–1	0–2	0–0	1–1	0–0	0–2	1–1	0–2	2–0	1–1	0–1	1–0	3–0	—

Source: DFB
Legend: Blue = home team win; Yellow = draw; Red = away team win.

== Promotion play-offs ==
=== First leg ===
25 May 2017
20:30 CEST

VfL Wolfsburg	1–0	Eintracht Braunschweig
Gómez 35' (pen.)	Report

Volkswagen Arena, Wolfsburg
Attendance: 29,100
Referee: Sascha Stegemann (Niederkassel)

=== Second leg ===
29 May 2017
20:30 CEST

Eintracht Braunschweig	0–1	VfL Wolfsburg
	Report	Vieirinha 49'

Eintracht-Stadion, Braunschweig
Attendance: 23,000
Referee: Tobias Stieler (Hamburg)

VfL Wolfsburg won 2–0 on aggregate and both clubs therefore remained in their respective tiers for the 2017–18 season.

== Relegation play-offs ==
=== First leg ===
26 May 2017
18:00 CEST

Jahn Regensburg	1–1	1860 Munich
Lais 2'	Report	Neuhaus 78'

Continental Arena, Regensburg
Attendance: 15,224
Referee: Patrick Ittrich

=== Second leg ===
30 May 2017
18:00 CEST

1860 Munich	0–2	Jahn Regensburg
	Report	Pusch 30'; Lais 41'

Allianz Arena, Munich
Attendance: 62,200
Referee: Daniel Siebert

Jahn Regensburg won 3–1 on aggregate and were promoted to the 2. Bundesliga.

== Statistics ==
=== Top goalscorers ===
Rank	Player	Club	Goals
1	(Germany) Simon Terodde	VfB Stuttgart	25
2	(Austria) Martin Harnik	Hannover 96	17
3	(Germany) Stefan Kutschke	Dynamo Dresden	16
4	(Morocco) Aziz Bouhaddouz	FC St. Pauli	15
5	(Austria) Guido Burgstaller	1. FC Nürnberg	14
6	(Germany) Fabian Klos	Arminia Bielefeld	13
6	(Democratic Republic of the Congo) Domi Kumbela	Eintracht Braunschweig	13
8	(Sweden) Christoffer Nyman	Eintracht Braunschweig	11
8	(Germany) Marc Schnatterer	1. FC Heidenheim	11
10	(Germany) Serdar Dursun	Greuther Fürth	10
10	(Germany) Akaki Gogia	Dynamo Dresden	10
10	(Germany) Pascal Köpke	Erzgebirge Aue	10

=== Clean sheets ===
Rank	Player	Club	Clean sheets
1	(Germany) Philipp Tschauner	Hannover 96	16
2	(Germany) Julian Pollersbeck	1. FC Kaiserslautern	14
3	(Germany) Kevin Müller	1. FC Heidenheim	13
4	(Austria) Marco Knaller	SV Sandhausen	12
5	(Bosnia and Herzegovina) Jasmin Fejzić	Eintracht Braunschweig	11
5	(Germany) Michael Rensing	Fortuna Düsseldorf	11
9	(Australia) Mitchell Langerak	VfB Stuttgart	9
9	(Germany) Martin Männel	Erzgebirge Aue	9
9	(Germany) Marvin Schwäbe	Dynamo Dresden	9
10	(Germany) Philipp Heerwagen	FC St. Pauli	8
10	(Hungary) Balázs Megyeri	Greuther Fürth	8
10	(Germany) Robert Wulnikowski	Würzburger Kickers	8

=== Number of teams by state ===
Position	State	Number of teams	Teams
1	Bavaria	4	Greuther Fürth, 1860 Munich, Nürnberg, and Würzburger Kickers
1	Baden-Württemberg	4	Heidenheim, Karlsruher SC, SV Sandhausen and Stuttgart
3	North Rhine-Westphalia	3	Arminia Bielefeld, Bochum and Fortuna Düsseldorf
4	Lower Saxony	2	Eintracht Braunschweig and Hannover 96
4	Saxony	2	Dynamo Dresden and Erzgebirge Aue
6	Berlin	1	Union Berlin
6	Hamburg	1	FC St. Pauli
6	Rhineland-Palatinate	1	Kaiserslautern

== Attendances ==
No.	Team	Attendance	Change	Highest
1	VfB Stuttgart	50,573	-2.7%	60,000
2	Hannover 96	36,647	-11.2%	49,000
3	FC St. Pauli	29,401	0.2%	29,546
4	1. FC Nürnberg	28,834	-6.1%	44,089
5	Dynamo Dresden	28,515	3.5%	30,530
6	1. FC Kaiserslautern	26,368	1.9%	45,761
7	Fortuna 95	25,978	0.3%	37,320
8	TSV 1860	25,900	10.9%	47,100
9	BTSV Eintracht	21,424	1.1%	23,225
10	1. FC Union Berlin	20,859	5.6%	22,012
11	Arminia Bielefeld	17,504	-0.2%	25,138
12	VfL Bochum	16,933	-5.1%	27,600
13	Karlsruher SC	13,855	-13.5%	27,930
14	1. FC Heidenheim	12,518	-2.3%	15,000
15	Würzburger Kickers	11,145	111.7%	13,080
16	Greuther Fürth	9,525	-7.2%	13,205
17	Erzgebirge Aue	8,588	3.6%	10,000
18	SV Sandhausen	6,731	8.1%	13,083
