= List of Kispest-Honvéd FC managers =

Kispest-Honvéd Football Club is a professional football club based in Budapest, Hungary.

== Managers ==
Manager	Nationality	From	To	P	W	D	L	GF	GA	Win	Honours	Notes
Béla Stalmach	Hungary	1935	1937									
Ferenc Puskás I	Hungary	1937	1942									
Pál Titkos	Hungary	1942	1943									
István Szokodi	Hungary	1944										
Ferenc Puskás I	Hungary	1945	1947									
Béla Guttmann	Hungary	1947	1948									
Ferenc Puskás I		1948	1951									
Jenő Kalmár		1952	1956									
Gábor Kiss		1957										
Károly Sós		1957	1960									
György Babolcsay		1960	1962									
Gyula Lóránt		1 July 1962	30 June 1963									
Nándor Bányai		1963	1966									
Mihály Kispéter												
József Bozsik		1966	1967									
György Babolcsay		1967										
Kálmán Preiner		1968	1971									
György Babolcsay	Hungary	1971										
József Mészáros	Hungary	1971	1973									
Lajos Faragó	Hungary	1973	1974									
Károly Lakat	Hungary	1974	1976									
Lajos Tichy	Hungary	1 July 1976	30 June 1982									
Imre Komora	Hungary	1 July 1982	30 June 1986									
István Vági	Hungary	1 July 1986	31 December 1986									
Imre Komora	Hungary	1987										
Bertalan Bicskei	Hungary	1987	1988									
József Both	Hungary	1989										
Sándor Haász	Hungary	6 December 1989	30 June 1990									
György Mezey	Hungary	1 July 1990	30 June 1992	64	40	12	12	117	52		1 Nemzeti Bajnokság I	
József Verebes	Hungary	1992										
Lajos Szurgent	Hungary	1992										
Martti Kuusela	Finland	1992	30 June 1994	41	24	8	9	86	45		1 Nemzeti Bajnokság I	
Dimitri Davidović	Serbia and Montenegro Belgium	1 July 1994	1994									
Mihály Kozma	Hungary	1995										
Péter Török	Hungary	1995	1996									
Bertalan Bicskei	Hungary	1996	1997									
Zoltán Varga	Hungary	1997										
Imre Komora	Hungary	1 July 1997	30 June 1998									
György Gálhidi	Hungary	1 July 1998	30 June 1999									
Imre Komora	Hungary	1999										
István Reszeli Soós	Hungary	9 September 1999	15 June 2000	29	9	9	11	26	36			
Barnabás Tornyi	Hungary	16 June 2000	11 April 2001									
Lajos Szurgent	Hungary	2001										
Róbert Glázer	Hungary	10 September 2001	15 December 2001									
Lajos Détári	Hungary	1 January 2002	30 June 2002	18	5	7	6	21	30			
József Fitos	Hungary	2002										
Ioan Pătrașcu	Romania	27 August 2002	8 November 2002									
Lajos Szurgent	Hungary	8 November 2002	6 January 2003									
Tibor Őze	Hungary	6 January 2003	13 April 2003									
József Duró	Hungary	13 April 2003	30 June 2003									
György Gálhidi	Hungary	1 July 2003	17 August 2004									
György Bognár	Hungary	18 August 2004	29 December 2004	13	6	2	5	22	28			
Lajos Szurgent	Hungary	6 January 2005	14 April 2005	6	2	0	4	8	15			
Károly Gergely	Hungary	14 April 2005	22 June 2005	9	2	3	4	5	10			
Aldo Dolcetti	Italy	1 July 2005	19 October 2006	40	11	12	17	47	68			
Attila Supka	Hungary	1 July 2006	20 May 2008									
Gábor Pölöskei	Hungary	1 July 2008	23 February 2009	22	8	5	9	32	34			
Tibor Sisa	Hungary	25 February 2009	23 October 2009	35	10	10	15	37	51			
Massimo Morales	Italy	28 October 2009	13 November 2010	40	17	13	10	56	39			
László Szalai (interim)	Hungary	17 November 2010	31 December 2010	3	1	1	1	7	1			
Attila Supka	Hungary	1 January 2011	30 May 2012	47	18	11	18	67	68			
Marco Rossi	Italy	1 June 2012	28 April 2014	71	31	14	26	110	86			
Pietro Vierchowod	Italy	13 June 2014	6 October 2014	11	4	1	6	12	15			
József Csábi	Hungary	26 October 2014	7 February 2015	6	0	2	4	4	10			
Marco Rossi	Italy	7 February 2015	28 May 2017	87	39	18	30	135	96		1 Nemzeti Bajnokság I	
Erik van der Meer	Netherlands	28 May 2017	10 December 2017									
Attila Supka	Hungary	10 December 2017	27 May 2019	65	29	17	19	101	78			
Giuseppe Sannino	Italy	28 May 2019	19 March 2020	36	15	10	11	46	41			
István Pisont (caretaker)	Hungary	19 March 2020	1 July 2020	11	5	2	4	18	17			
Tamás Bódog	Hungary	1 July 2020	6 December 2020	16	5	4	7	27	23	31.25%		
István Pisont	Hungary	7 December 2020	15 February 2021	10	4	3	3	19	14	40%		
Ferenc Horváth	Hungary	21 February 2021	30 January 2022	33	12	5	16	51	52	36.36%		
Nebojša Vignjević	Serbia	2 February 2022	9 June 2022	17	5	6	6	20	20	29.41%		
Tam Courts	Scotland	15 June 2022	24 October 2022	14	5	4	5	18	20	35.71%		
Dean Klafurić	Croatia	24 October 2022	28 May 2023	22	5	5	12	20	34	22.72%		
Máté Pinezits	Hungary	1 June 2023	31 October 2023	14	5	4	5	19	17	35.71%		
Đorđe Kamber (interim)	Bosnia and Herzegovina	1 November 2023	7 November 2023	2	0	0	2	6	10	0		
Aurél Csertői	Hungary	8 November 2023	15 August 2024	23	8	8	7	28	23	34.78%		
Zsolt Laczkó	Hungary	19 August 2024	17 December 2024	13	3	3	7	15	23	23%		
Tamás Feczkó	Hungary	19 December 2024	22 May 2026	50	30	8	12	91	50			
Maurizio Jacobacci	Switzerland	6 june 2026										
