= Paul Sauter =

German football manager

Personal information
- Date of birth: 14 June 1947

Managerial career
- Years: Team
- 1982–1984: SSV Ulm 1846
- 1984–1986: FC Augsburg
- 1990–1994: SSV Ulm 1846
- 1994: Stuttgarter Kickers
- 2006–2008: Togo U17
- 2007–2008: SSV Ulm 1846
- 2011–2012: SSV Ulm 1846
- 2012–2013: SSV Ulm 1846

Paul Sauter (born 14 June 1947) is a retired German football manager.
