= Honvédség =

Honvédség is Hungarian for "homeland defence" and may refer to:

- Royal Hungarian Landwehr (1867-1918)
- Royal Hungarian Army (1920-1945)
- Hungarian Defence Force (1946-present)
