= András Komjáti =

Hungarian footballer

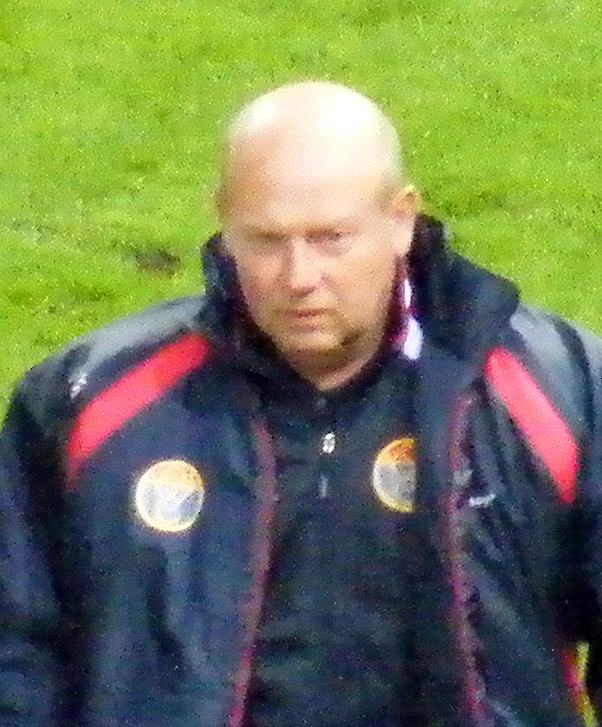

Personal information
- Date of birth: 20 November 1953 (age 72)
- Place of birth: Győr, Hungary

Managerial career
- Years: Team
- 1999-2000: Vasas
- 2000-2001: Debrecen
- 2001: Vasas
- 2002-2003: Sopron
- 2005-2007: Puskás
- 2010-2011: Vasas
- 2013-2014: Békéscsaba
- 2018: Puskás
- 2019: Puskás

András Komjáti (born 20 November 1953) is a Hungarian professional football manager and former player.

== Career ==
He won the 1976–77 Nemzeti Bajnokság I season with Vasas SC.

== Managerial career ==
=== Debrecen ===
On 15 December 2000, he was appointed as the manager of Debreceni VSC.

He managed Debreceni VSC in the 2000–01 Nemzeti Bajnokság I season.

=== Vasas ===
In 2011, he was appointed as the manager of Vasas SC. Later in that year, he was sacked.

=== Sopron ===
He was appointed as the manager of FC Sopron.

=== Békéscsaba ===
On 4 April 2013, he was appointed as the manager of Békéscsaba 1912 Előre. He will help József Pásztor.

=== Puskás ===
On 12 June 2017, he was appointed as the club director of Puskás Akadémia FC.

On 8 December 2018, he was appointed as an interim manager of Puskás Akadémia FC after Miklós Benczés was sacked.
