= Marc-Patrick Meister =

German football manager

Personal information
- Date of birth: 23 July 1980 (age 46)
- Place of birth: Bruchsal, West Germany

Managerial career
- Years: Team
- 2004–2006: FV Ubstadt
- 2017: Karlsruher SC
- 2020–: Germany U16

Marc-Patrick Meister (born 23 July 1980) is a German football manager who manages Germany U16. He previously managed Karlsruher SC.
