= László Dajka =

Hungarian footballer

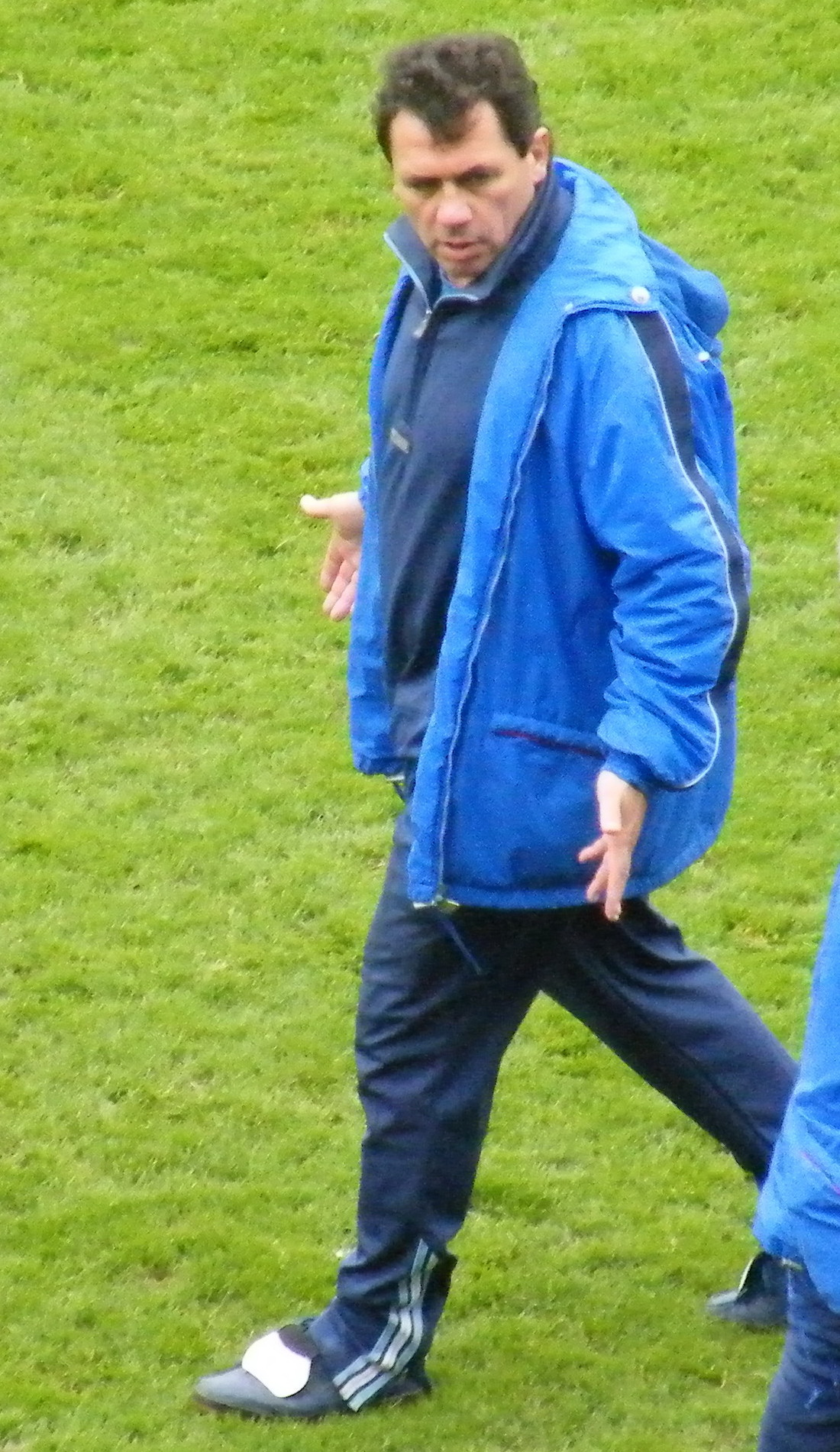

Personal information
- Date of birth: 29 April 1959 (age 67)
- Place of birth: Nyíregyháza, Hungary
- Height: 1.78 m (5 ft 10 in)
- Position: Midfielder

Team information
- Current team: Budafok

Youth career
- 1975–1978: Kisvárdai SE
- 1978–1979: Bem József SE

Senior career*
Years	Team	Apps	(Gls)
1978–1988	Budapest Honvéd	232	(58)
1988–1990	UD Las Palmas	82	(12)
1990–1992	Yverdon-Sport FC		
1992–1993	Kecskeméti TE		

International career
1980–1988	Hungary	24	(0)

Managerial career
- 1993–1994: BVSC Budapest (assistant coach)
- 1994–1995: Kecskeméti TE
- 1996–1997: BVSC Budapest
- 1998–1999: Szombathelyi Haladás
- 1999–2001: BKV Előre SC
- 2001: Békéscsaba
- 2001–2003: Hungary (assistant coach)
- 2002: Debreceni VSC
- 2003–2005: FC Sopron
- 2005: Békéscsaba
- 2005–2006: Zalaegerszegi TE
- 2007–2008: FC Dabas
- 2008–2009: FC Tatabánya
- 2009–2010: Soroksár SC
- 2011–2012: Puskás Akadémia U18
- 2012–2013: Békéscsaba
- 2014: Hungary U21 (caretaker)
- 2015: Budafok
- 2016: Dabas
- 2017: Nyíregyháza
- 2018–2019: Kisvárda
- 2024–: Budafok
- * Club domestic league appearances and goals

László Dajka (born 29 April 1959) is a Hungarian football manager and former player who manages Nemzeti Bajnokság II club Budafok.

== Playing career ==
Dajka was born in Nyíregyháza. In the season 1980–81, he participated into the European Champions' Cup with Budapest Honved where they reached the second round of the competition where they were beaten by Real Madrid by a 3–0 aggregate scoreline.

He participated in the 1986 World Cup, which turned out a major disaster for Hungarian football – mainly because of the 6–0 defeat against the Soviet Union – and for Dajka in particular, having scored an own goal in the particular match.

He was particularly well known for headers, scoring a great number of his goals that way.

== Managerial career ==
Dajka has coached several Hungarian teams.

On 20 February 2024, Dajka signed for Nemzeti Bajnokság II's Budafok.

== Honours ==
Hungarian League: 1980, 1984, 1985, 1986, 1988
Hungarian Cup: 1985
