= Puskás Akadémia FC =

Puskás Akadémia
- Full name: Puskás Akadémia Football Club
- Short name: PAFC
- Founded: 2005; 21 years ago
- Ground: Pancho Aréna, Felcsút
- Capacity: 3,816 (all seated)
- Owner: Felcsúti Utánpótlás Neveléséért Alapítvány
- Coach: Zsolt Hornyák
- League: NB I
- 2025–26: NB I, 6th of 12
- Website: www.pfla.hu
Home colours	Away colours	Third colours

Puskás Akadémia Football Club is a professional football club based in Felcsút, Hungary. It competes in the Nemzeti Bajnokság I, the top flight of Hungarian football, where it has spent ten seasons, reached the Final of the 2017–18 Magyar Kupa season and finished third three times.

== On the pitch history ==
The aim of the founders was to establish an academy for Fehérvár FC and to establish a team in memorial to the Hungarian footballer Ferenc Puskás.

=== 2010s ===
Puskás won the 2012–13 Nemzeti Bajnokság II and were promoted to the Nemzeti Bajnokság I. Puskás could win 21 matches and drew only seven times. The club were beaten only twice during the season.

In the first season of the top tier (2013–14 Nemzeti Bajnokság I), Puskás finished 14th and escaped from the relegation. The club collected 31 point. On 28 September 2013, Puskás surprisingly beat Ferencváros 3-1 at home on game week 9 of the 2013-14 Nemzeti Bajnokság I season.

In the 2014–15 Nemzeti Bajnokság I, Puskás finished 10th and escaped from relegation. Puskás also received a license from the Hungarian Football Federation during the transformation of the Nemzeti Bajnokság I. The transformation meant that the number of clubs were reduced to 12 from 16 and clubs such as Győr and Kecskemét were relegated even if they finished in the eighth and ninth position respectively.

On the 30th matchday of the 2015–16 Nemzeti Bajnokság I season, Robert Jarni was dismissed due to the defeat against Békéscsaba 1912 Előre at the Pancho Aréna on 16 April 2016 resulting Puskás Akadémia's last position and relegation for the first time in history.

On 22 December 2016, Attila Pintér was appointed as the head coach of the club. Pintér left Mezőkövesdi SE, playing in the 2016–17 Nemzeti Bajnokság I season, for Puskás Akadémia.

On 21 May 2017, Puskás Akadémia won the 2016–17 Nemzeti Bajnokság II season after a goalless draw against Ceglédi VSE in Albertirsa. As a consequence, Puskás Akadémia got promoted to the 2017–18 Nemzeti Bajnokság I season. They could return to the first division after spending only one year in the second division.

On 12 June 2017, András Komjáti, previously manager of Vasas SC, was appointed as the club director.

Before the start of the 2017–18 Nemzeti Bajnokság I, Puskás Akadémia signed Molnár from Mezőkövesd, Radó from Ferencváros, thus becoming the third most valuable team in the 2017–18 season of the Nemzeti Bajnokság I.

On 4 June 2018, Pintér was sacked after finishing 6th in the 2017–18 Nemzeti Bajnokság I.

On 8 December 2018, after a 1–1 draw against Paksi FC Benczés was sacked due to the negative results. The club finished 9th before the winter break. Therefore, András Komjáti would be the interim manager on the last match day of the 2018–19 Nemzeti Bajnokság I.

On 29 December 2018, János Radoki, who was born in Mór, was appointed as the manager of the club. Radoki previously played 25 matches in the 1999–2000 Bundesliga in SSV Ulm as a player. He managed the U-17 team of FC Augsburg and the U-19 team of Greuther Fürth. On 7 April 2019, Radoki was replaced by András Komjáti after a shocking defeat (0–4) at home against Kisvárda FC.

=== 2020s ===
The first match of the 2020-21 Nemzeti Bajnokság I season was postponed after one player tested positive for COVID-19.

Puskás finished second in the 2020–21 Nemzeti Bajnokság I season. Therefore, they were eligible for playing in the 2021-22 UEFA Conference League season. In the first round, Puskás drew with FC Inter Turku and beat the Finnish team at home. However, in the second round Puskás were defeated both at home (0–2) and away (0–3) by the Latvian club FK RFS.

On 21 July 2022, Puskás lost 3–0 against Vitória S.C. in the first leg of the second round of the 2022–23 UEFA Europa Conference League at the Estádio D. Afonso Henriques in Guimarães, Portugal.

In the 2023–24 Nemzeti Bajnokság I, Puskás Akadémia finished third. They won 15 matches, among which the most surprising victory was against title holders Ferencváros at the Groupama Aréna on 13 August 2023. Puskás Akadémia drew 10 times and lost eight matches. The biggest defeat was against Kecskemét on 26 August 2023.

Puskás entered the second round of the 2024–25 UEFA Conference League qualifying phase. However, they could advance to the third round without playing against SC Dnipro-1 since the Ukrainian opponent forfeited due to bankruptcy. Puskás were awarded a 6–0 victory. On 28 July 2024, Puskás started the 2024–25 Nemzeti Bajnokság I with a 2–1 victory over Újpest FC at the Szusza Ferenc Stadion. On 4 August 2024, Puskás beat Zalaegerszeg at home in the Nemzeti Bajnokság. On 8 August 2024, Puskás beat FC Ararat-Armenia 1–0 at the Vazgen Sargsyan Republican Stadium in Yerevan, Armenia. The only goal was scored by Mikael Soisalo in the 89th minute. On 11 August 2024, Puskás beat newly-promoted Nyíregyháza 3-1 at home in the Nemzeti Bajnokság. On 15 August 2024, Puskás drew with Ararat-Armenia (3–3) at the Pancho Aréna. Puskás qualified for the play-offs on 4–3 aggregate. On 18 August 2024, Puksás beat MTK Budapest 1-0 at home. The club started the season with four victories. On 22 August 2024, Puksás were hosted by Serie A club ACF Fiorentina. Puskás took the lead and in the 12th minute Puskás were winning by two goals. The goals were scored by Zsolt Nagy and Soisalo. Just before the end of the first half, Ricardo Sottil scored a goal (1–2). In the second half, Fiorentina could equalize the result thanks to Lucas Martinez Quarta and took the lead in the 75th minute thanks to Moise Kean. In the 89th minute Wojciech Golla scored the equalizer. The match ended with a draw (3–3) at the Stadio Artemio Franchi, Florence, Italy. In the second tie, Puskás drew with Fiorentina at the Panho Aréna on 29 August 2024. Fiorentina took the lead in the 59th minute by Kean. Zsolt Nagy scored the equalizer in the 97th minute. In the extra time the teams did not score any goals. In the penalty shoot-out, Roland Szolnoki missed the penalty which meant that Fiorentina qualified for the 2024–25 UEFA Conference League league phase.

In the 2024–25 Nemzeti Bajnokság I season, Puskás was in close competition for their first title with major rivals Ferencvárosi TC and Paksi FC. On the 30th match day, Ferencváros hosted Puskás at the Groupama Aréna and the match ended with a 1–1 draw on 3 May 2025. In the next round, Puskás beat Debreceni VSC 4–2 at home, while Ferencváros beat Paks 3–2 away. Finally, Puskás finished in the second position and qualified for the UEFA Conference League.

On 9 May 2025, Zsolt Hornyák renewed his contract until 2027.

In June 2025, Ármin Pécsi sold to Liverpool F.C.. On 8 July 2025, the club signed former Hungarian national team and Hertha BSC coach Pál Dárdai's oldest son, Palkó Dárdai.

Puskás entered the second round of the 2025–26 UEFA Conference League qualifying phase. On 24 July 2025, Puskás were beaten 3–2 by Aris Limassol FC at the Alphamega Stadium, in Limassol, Cyprus. In the second, leg Puskás lost to Aris 2–0 at home and thus were eliminated from the European competition.

In the 2025–26 Nemzeti Bajnokság I season, Puskás started their campaign at home against newly-promoted Kazincbarcikai SC and they beat the Borsod team by 2–1. On game week 2, Puskás beat Nyíregyháza Spartacus FC 3–2 at home. Puskás's first away match ended with a 2–1 victory for newly-promoted Kisvárda FC.

On 1 June 2026, it was announced that Zsolt Hornyák left the club. He has been the longest serving manager of the club with 270 league matches.

== Honours ==
- Nemzeti Bajnokság II
  - Winners (2): 2012–13, 2016–17

== Seasons ==
=== League positions ===
As of 12 July 2025

== European record ==
As of matches played 31 July 2025

Season	Competition	Round	Club	Home	Away	Agg.
2020–21	UEFA Europa League	1QR	(Sweden) Hammarby IF	0−3		
2021–22	UEFA Europa Conference League	1QR	(Finland) Inter Turku	2–0	1–1	3–1
2021–22	UEFA Europa Conference League	2QR	(Latvia) RFS	0−2	0−3	0−5
2022–23	UEFA Europa Conference League	2QR	(Portugal) Vitória de Guimarães	0–0	0−3	0–3
2024–25	UEFA Conference League	2QR	(Ukraine) Dnipro-1	3−0 awd.	3−0 awd.	6−0
2024–25	UEFA Conference League	3QR	Ararat-Armenia	3–3	1–0	4–3
2024–25	UEFA Conference League	PO	(Italy) Fiorentina	1–1 (a.e.t.)	3–3	4–4 (4–5 p)
2025–26	UEFA Conference League	2QR	(Cyprus) Aris Limassol	0−2	2–3	2−5

Notes

- QR: Qualifying round
- PO: Play-off round

== Players ==
=== First team squad ===
As of 22 September 2026

Note: Flags indicate national team as defined under FIFA eligibility rules; some limited exceptions apply. Players may hold more than one non-FIFA nationality.

No.	Pos.	Nation	Player
1	GK	HUN	Tamás Markek
4	MF	HUN	Michael Okeke
6	MF	CPV	Laros Duarte
8	FW	HUN	Dániel Lukács
9	FW	GAM	Lamin Colley
10	MF	HUN	Palkó Dárdai
14	DF	POL	Wojciech Golla
16	MF	FIN	Urho Nissilä
18	MF	HUN	Bence Vékony
19	MF	UKR	Artem Favorov (vice-captain)
20	FW	FIN	Mikael Soisalo
21	DF	ARM	Georgy Arutyunyan
22	DF	HUN	Roland Szolnoki (captain)

No.	Pos.	Nation	Player
24	DF	HUN	Pál Barna
25	DF	HUN	Zsolt Nagy (vice-captain)
33	DF	ENG	Brandon Ormonde-Ottewill
34	MF	HUN	Szabolcs Dusinszki
61	GK	HUN	Mirkó Bozó
66	MF	HUN	Zsombor Varga
68	MF	HUN	Dániel Brügger
72	GK	HUN	Bendegúz Lehoczki
74	MF	HUN	Martin Kern
77	FW	HUN	Kevin Mondovics
88	DF	HUN	Bendegúz Farkas
90	FW	HUN	András Németh
96	DF	HUN	Roland Orján
99	FW	HUN	Zoárd Nagy

=== Out on loan ===
Note: Flags indicate national team as defined under FIFA eligibility rules; some limited exceptions apply. Players may hold more than one non-FIFA nationality.

No.	Pos.	Nation	Player
—	MF	ISR	Moshe Semel (at (Israel) Hapoel Ramat Gan until 30 June 2027)

=== Reserve team ===
For the reserve squads, see Puskás Akadémia II

== Records ==
As of 21 May 2025.

=== Top appearances ===
	Top appearances	Matches
1	(Hungary) Zsolt Nagy	247
2	(Hungary) Csaba Spandler	205
3	(Hungary) Roland Szolnoki	168
4	(Czech Republic) Jakub Plšek	162
5	(Ukraine) Artem Favorov	143

=== Top scorers ===
	Top scorers	
1	(Hungary) Patrik Tischler	45
2	(Croatia) Josip Knežević	44
3	(Hungary) László Lencse	42
4	(Hungary) Zsolt Nagy	40
5	(Czech Republic) Jakub Plšek	29

== See also ==
- List of Puskás Akadémia FC managers
- List of Puskás Akadémia FC seasons
- Puskás Akadémia FC II
