= Zoran Spišljak =

Serbian footballer and manager

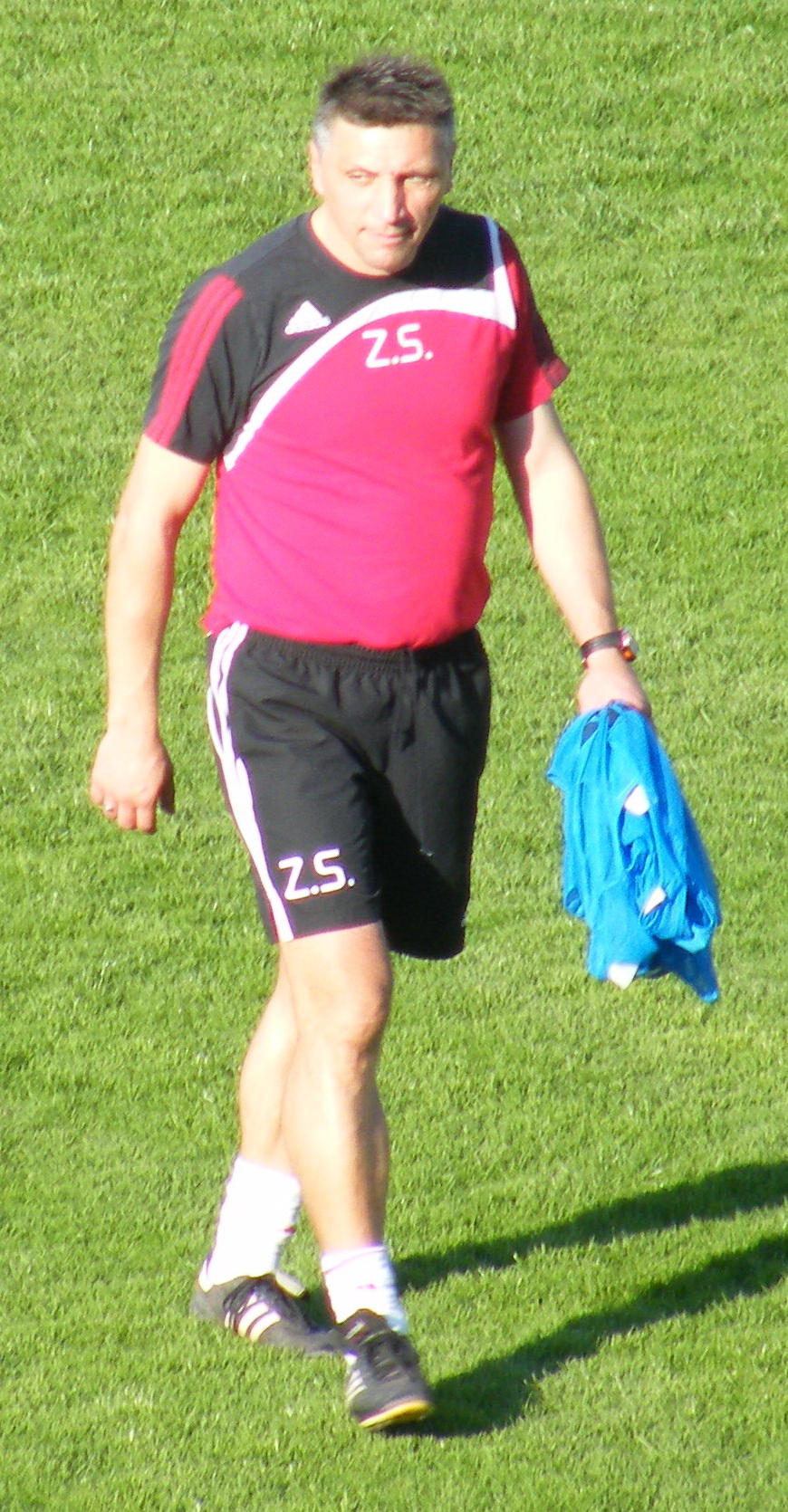
- Spišljak in 2009

Personal information
- Date of birth: 12 January 1965 (age 61)
- Place of birth: Feketić, SFR Yugoslavia

Team information
- Current team: Hatvan (manager)

Managerial career
- Years: Team
- 1998–2002: Cardiff (youth)
- 2004–2007: Barnet (youth)
- 2007–2010: Debrecen (assistant)
- 2011–2012: Újpest
- 2013–2014: Létavértes
- 2014–2017: Békéscsaba
- 2017: Zalaegerszeg
- 2018: Vác
- 2018–2019: Nyíregyháza
- 2022–2025: Hatvan

Zoran Spišljak (born 12 January 1965) is a Serbian football manager.

== Managerial career ==
On 10 August 2011, Spišljak became the head coach of the Nemzeti Bajnokság I club Újpest FC.

Spišljak became the coach of the Nemzeti Bajnokság II club Békéscsaba 1912 Előre SE in the summer of 2014.
