= Alois Schwartz =

German footballer & manager (born 1967)

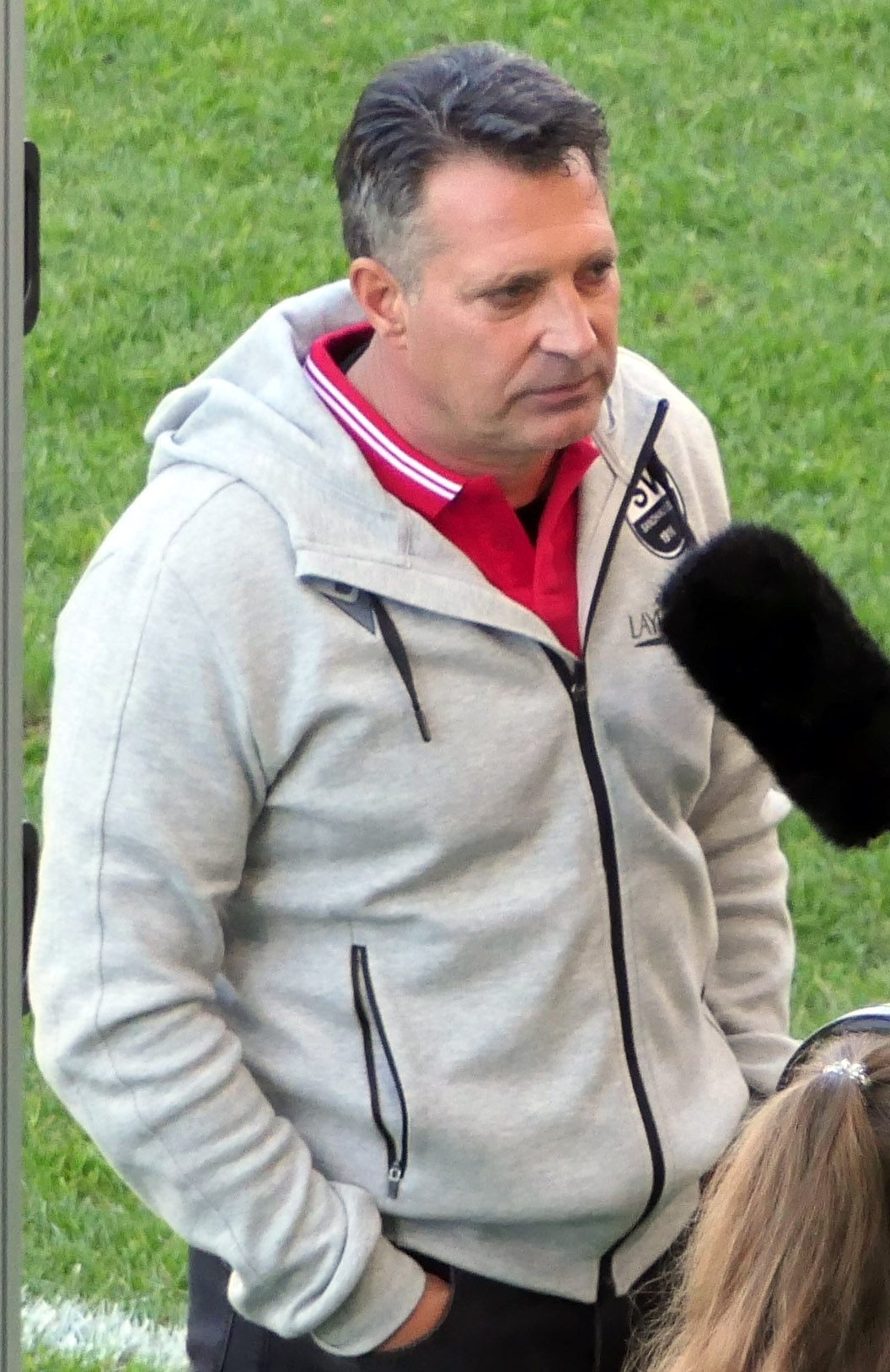
- Schwartz in 2021

Personal information
- Date of birth: 28 March 1967 (age 59)
- Place of birth: Nürtingen, West Germany
- Height: 1.82 m (6 ft 0 in)
- Position: Midfielder

Team information
- Current team: SSV Ulm 1846 (manager)

Senior career*
Years	Team	Apps	(Gls)
1985–1993	Stuttgarter Kickers		
1993–1995	MSV Duisburg		
1995–1996	Rot-Weiß Essen		
1996–1997	Waldhof Mannheim		
1997–1998	FC 08 Homburg		
1998–2002	SC Pfullendorf		

Managerial career
- 2003: Rot-Weiß Erfurt (caretaker)
- 2005–2006: Wormatia Worms
- 2007–2009: 1. FC Kaiserslautern II
- 2009: 1. FC Kaiserslautern (caretaker)
- 2009–2012: 1. FC Kaiserslautern II
- 2012–2013: Rot-Weiß Erfurt
- 2013–2016: SV Sandhausen
- 2016–2017: 1. FC Nürnberg
- 2017–2020: Karlsruher SC
- 2021–2023: SV Sandhausen
- 2023: Hansa Rostock
- 2025: 1. FC Saarbrücken
- 2026: Preußen Münster
- 2026–: SSV Ulm 1846
- * Club domestic league appearances and goals

Alois Schwartz (born 28 March 1967) is a German football manager and former player.

== Managerial career ==
Schwartz was manager of Rot-Weiß Erfurt between 11 April 2003 and 30 June 2003 where he won one out of 10 matches. His first match was a 4–2 loss to Stuttgarter Kickers on 11 April 2003 and his only win was against Jahn Regensburg. He was replaced by René Müller.

Schwartz was manager of 1. FC Kaiserslautern II between 1 January 2007 to 9 September 2012. His first match was a 0–0 draw against Wehen Wiesbaden on 23 February 2007. He failed to win any matches during the 2006–07 season after only drawing three matches and losing 11. His first win came during the 2007–08 season against SC Idar-Oberstein on 1 August 2007. Kaiserslautern II finished in second place and was promoted back into the Regionalliga. Kaiserslautern II again finished in second place in 2008–09 season. Kaiserslautern II finished in eighth place in the 2009–10 season, fourth in 2010–11 season, and ninth in the 2011–12 season. He left Kaiserslautern II on 9 September 2012. Kaiserslautern II was in eighth place at the time Schwartz left the club.

While he was manager of Kaiserslautern II, he was manager of 1. FC Kaiserslautern between 4 May 2009 and 30 June 2009. Kaiserslautern won his first match against FC Augsburg and lost the remaining three.

Schwartz returned to Rot-Weiß Erfurt on 10 September 2012 and was there until 30 June 2013. His first match was a 2–0 win against 1. FC Saarbrücken on 15 September 2012. He finished with a record of 10 wins, nine draws, and 11 losses.

Schwartz took over SV Sandhausen on 1 July 2013. His first match was a 0–0 draw against VfR Aalen on 19 July 2013. In the 2013–14 season, Sandhausen finished in 12th place and were knocked out of the German Cup in the Round of 16 by Eintracht Frankfurt. In the 2014–15 season, Sandhausen finished 12th, for the second consecutive season, and were knocked out of the German Cup in the first round, losing 4–1 to Arminia Bielefeld. The season started with a five-match winless streak. In the 2015–16 season, Sandhausen finished in 13th place and were knocked out of the German Cup in the second round, after losing in a shoot-out to 1. FC Heidenheim. Schwartz took over at 1. FC Nürnberg on 25 June 2016. His final match as Sandhausen manager was a 3–1 loss to Greuther Fürth on 15 May 2016.

Schwartz took over at Nürnberg on 25 June 2016. His first match was a 1–1 draw against Dynamo Dresden on 6 August 2016. He was sacked on 7 March 2017. He finished with a record of eight wins, six draws, and 11 losses.

On 29 August 2017, Schwartz was appointed the new manager of Karlsruher SC. He was sacked on 3 February 2020.

In September 2021, he returned as head coach of 2. Bundesliga club SV Sandhausen. He was sacked in February 2023.

He was appointed as the new head coach of Hansa Rostock in March 2023. In December 2023, he was sacked.

In April 2025, he was named the new manager of 1. FC Saarbrücken. He left the club by mutual consent on 25 November 2025.

On 24 March 2026, Schwartz became manager of Preußen Münster. He left Münster two months later.

On 5 October 2026, he became new manager of SSV Ulm 1846.

== Personal life ==
His stepson Nico Müller is footballer by his former club FC 08 Homburg.

== Managerial record ==
As of matches played on 14 November 2026

Team	From	To	Record					
Team	From	To	G	W	D	L	Win %	Ref.
Rot-Weiß Erfurt	11 April 2003	30 June 2003	10	1	3	6	10.00	
1. FC Kaiserslautern II	1 January 2007	9 September 2012	193	86	48	59	44.56	
1. FC Kaiserslautern	4 May 2009	30 June 2009	4	1	0	3	25.00	
Rot-Weiß Erfurt	10 September 2012	31 May 2013	30	10	9	11	33.33	
SV Sandhausen	1 July 2013	25 June 2016	108	35	30	43	32.41	
1. FC Nürnberg	25 June 2016	7 March 2017	25	8	6	11	32.00	
Karlsruher SC	29 August 2017	3 February 2020	95	44	30	21	46.32	
SV Sandhausen	22 September 2021	19 February 2023	51	16	14	21	31.37	
FC Hansa Rostock	22 March 2023	13 December 2023	27	10	4	13	37.04	
1. FC Saarbrücken	22 April 2025	25 November 2025	24	9	6	9	37.50	
SC Preußen Münster	24 March 2026	30 June 2026	7	0	4	3	0.00	
SSV Ulm 1846	5 October 2026	Present	6	1	4	1	16.67	
Total			580	221	158	201	38.10	—
