= János Radoki =

German-Hungarian footballer and manager

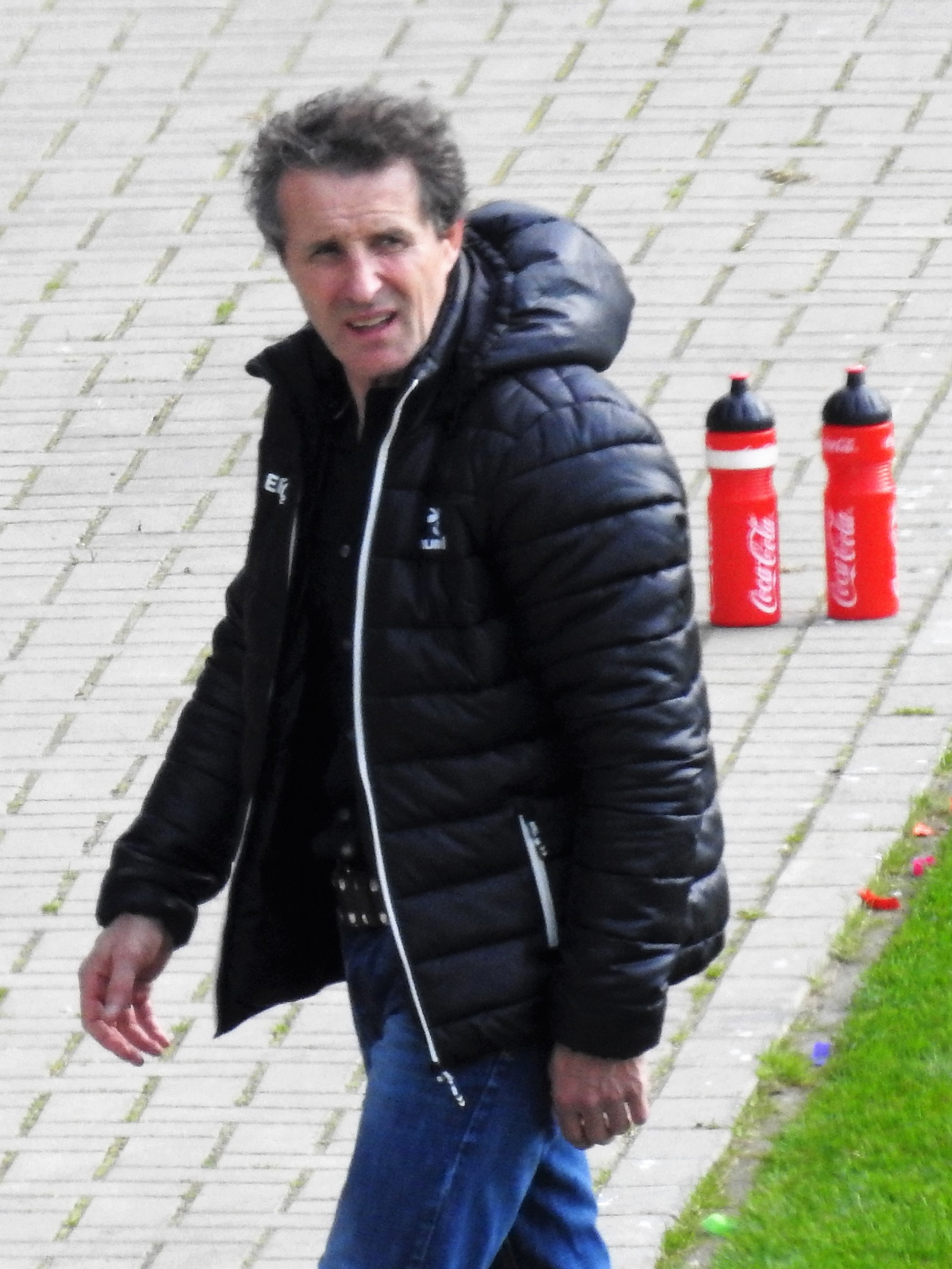
- Radoki in 2017

Personal information
- Date of birth: 7 March 1972 (age 54)
- Place of birth: Mór, Hungary
- Height: 1.76 m (5 ft 9 in)
- Position: Defender

Senior career*
Years	Team	Apps	(Gls)
1992–1995	FC Augsburg	45	(0)
1995–1996	TSV Vestenbergsgreuth	21	(0)
1996–1999	Greuther Fürth	84	(0)
1999–2001	SSV Ulm	58	(0)
2001–2003	Rot-Weiß Oberhausen	15	(0)
2004	FC Augsburg	0	(0)
2005–2006	DJK Lechhausen	16	(3)
2006–2008	TSV Rain am Lech	24	(0)
2011–2014	TSV Hilgertshausen	4	(0)
Total		267	(3)

Managerial career
- 2005–2006: DJK Lechhausen (player-manager)
- 2006–2008: TSV Rain am Lech (player-manager)
- 2008–2012: FC Augsburg (U17)
- 2012–2013: 1. FC Heidenheim (assistant)
- 2013–2016: Greuther Fürth (U19)
- 2016: Greuther Fürth (caretaker)
- 2016–2017: Greuther Fürth
- 2018–2019: Puskás Akadémia
- 2020–2023: Schwaben Augsburg
- * Club domestic league appearances and goals

János Radoki (born 7 March 1972) is a German-Hungarian former professional footballer who played as a defender.

Radoki was born in Hungary, but emigrated to Germany with his parents as a child. He holds German citizenship. He played his whole career in various German leagues, spending one season in the top division with SSV Ulm.

On 21 November 2016, Radoki was announced as the interim replacement for Stefan Ruthenbeck at Greuther Fürth, as the club was playing a disappointing season. He was sacked on 28 August 2017.

== International career ==
Radoki was called up to the Hungary national team in 2000 by captain Bertalan Bicskei. On 15 November 2000, he was nominated as a reserve player for the game against Macedonia, and he was already warming up to be substituted in when the game was abandoned due to the foggy weather. He was eventually never capped for Hungary.

== Managerial career ==
On 29 December 2018, he was appointed as the manager of the Nemzeti Bajnokság I club Puskás Akadémia FC. He was released from his contract on 7 April following a 0–4 home loss against Kisvárda FC.
