= Sándor Csató =

Hungarian footballer and coach

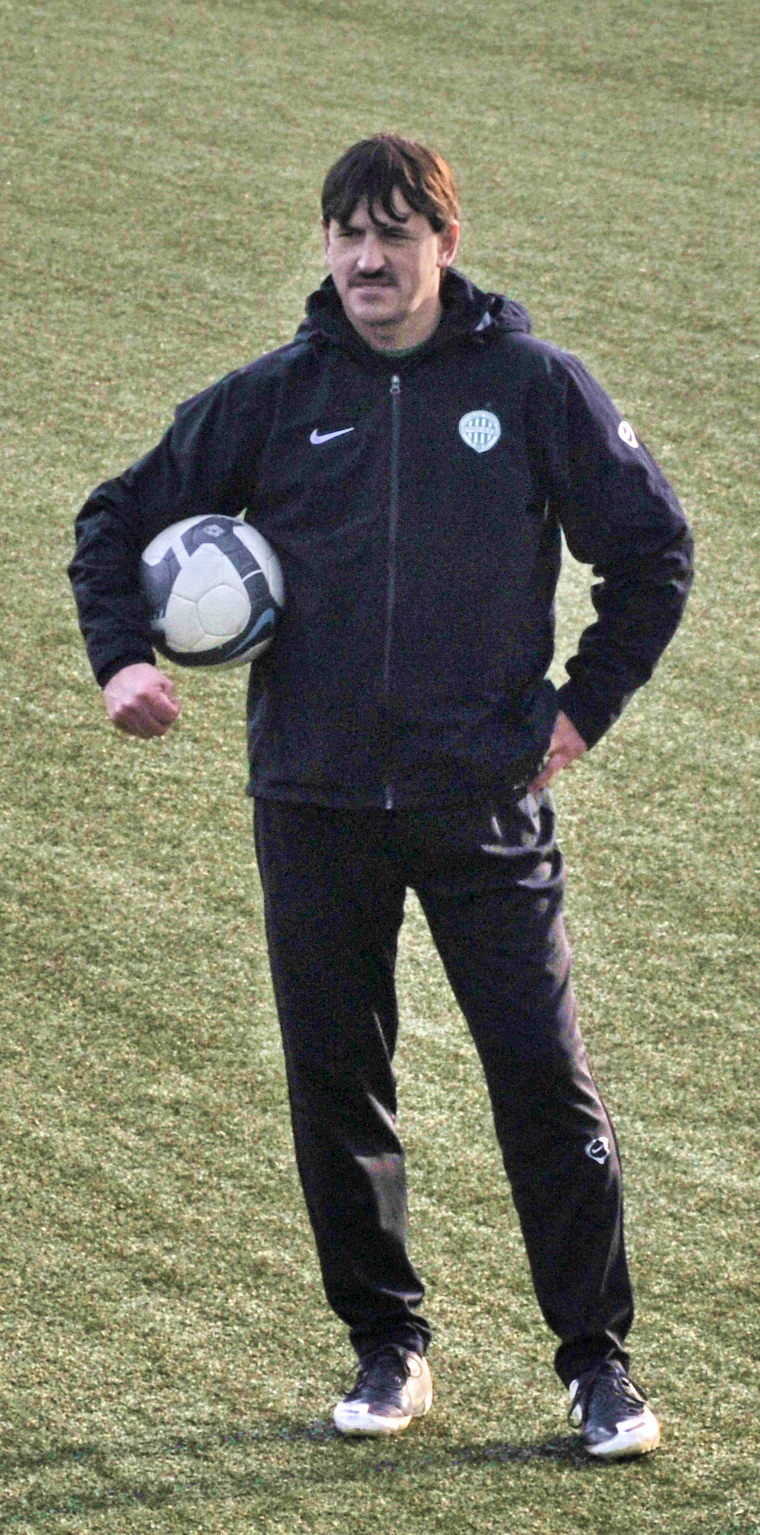

Personal information
- Date of birth: 1 July 1965 (age 61)
- Place of birth: Szolnok
- Position: Defensive midfielder

Senior career*
Years	Team	Apps	(Gls)
1983–1986	Szolnoki MÁV		
1987–1996	Békéscsabai Elõre	240	(37)
1993	→ MP Mikkeli		
1996–1999	Győri ETO FC	84	(8)
1999–2002	Videoton FC	52	(1)

Managerial career
- 2001–2004: Videoton (assistant)
- 2004–2005: Dunafém-Maroshegy
- 2006: Győri ETO (assistant)
- 2006–2007: Békéscsaba
- 2007–2009: Ferencváros (assistant)
- 2008: Ferencváros (caretaker)
- 2011–2015: Győri ETO (U19)
- 2015–2016: Zalaegerszeg (assistant)
- 2016–2017: Zalaegerszeg
- 2017: Zalaegerszeg (assistant)
- 2018–2020: Diósgyőr (U17)
- 2020–2021: Győri ETO
- * Club domestic league appearances and goals

Sándor Csató (born 1 July 1965) is a Hungarian football coach and a former midfielder.

== Managerial career ==
On 2 September 2020, he was appointed as the manager of the Nemzeti Bajnokság II club Győri ETO FC.
