= Gábor Brlázs =

Hungarian footballer

Personal information
- Date of birth: 20 October 1975 (age 51)
- Place of birth: Békéscsaba, Hungary
- Height: 1.79 m (5 ft 10 in)
- Position: Defender

Team information
- Current team: Békéscsaba (manager)

Youth career
- Csabacsűd SE

Senior career*
Years	Team	Apps	(Gls)
1997–1999	Békéscsabai Előre FC	20	(3)
1999–2000	Csabacsűd SE		
2000–2002	Orosháza FC		
2002–2009	Békéscsabai Előre FC	29	(0)

Managerial career
- 2022–: Békéscsaba
- * Club domestic league appearances and goals

Gábor Brlázs (born 20 October 1975) is a Hungarian football coach and a former player.

== Club career ==
Brlázs played for Békéscsabai Előre FC as a defender from 1 July 2006 until 30 June 2009.
