= Miklós Benczés =

Hungarian footballer and manager

Personal information
- Date of birth: 27 July 1969 (age 57)
- Place of birth: Salgótarján, Hungary

Managerial career
- Years: Team
- 2010–2012: Diósgyőri VTK
- 2012–2015: Puskás Akadémia FC
- 2015: Mezőkövesdi SE
- 2018: Puskás Akadémia FC
- 2024–: Ózdi Kohász SE

Miklós Benczés (born 6 September 1973) is a Hungarian football manager and a former player. He is the manager of Ózdi Kohász SE.

== Managerial career ==
=== Diósgyőr ===
On 7 May 2010, he was appointed as the manager of Diósgyőri VTK.

On 2 April 2012, he was sacked from his position.

=== Puskás ===
On 6 June 2015, he left Puskás on mutual consent.

=== Mezőkövesd ===
On 4 June 2015, he was appointed as the manager of Mezőkövesdi SE. On 9 November 2015, he resigned from his position.

=== Puskás ===
On 17 June 2018, he was appointed as the manager of Puskás Akadémia FC. On 8 December 2018, he was removed from his position at Puskás.

=== Diósgyőr ===
On 11 September 2019, he was appointed as the sports director of Diósgyőri VTK. On 27 April 2022, he resigned from his position.
