= György Babolcsay =

Hungarian footballer and manager

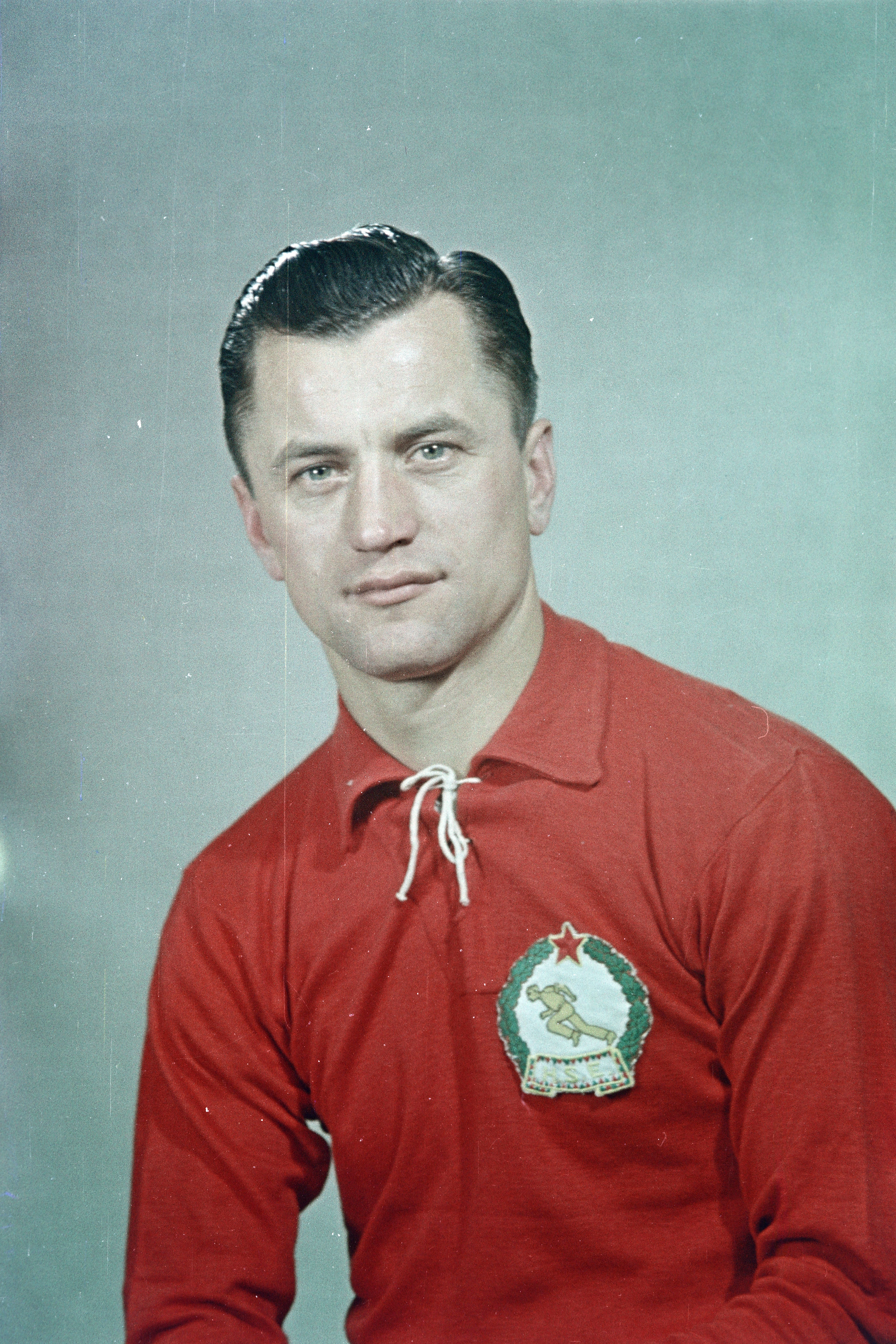

Personal information
- Date of birth: 26 December 1921
- Place of birth: Sashalom, Hungary
- Date of death: 13 July 1976 (aged 54)
- Place of death: Budapest, Hungary
- Position: Forward

Senior career*
Years	Team	Apps	(Gls)
1944	Kolozsvári AC	2	(0)
1944–1945	Zuglói SE	8	(6)
1946–1958	Budapesti Honvéd	306	(7)

International career
1950–1953	Hungary	4	(0)

Managerial career
- 1960–1962: Budapesti Honvéd
- 1963–1965: PAOK
- 1967: Budapesti Honvéd
- 1971: Budapesti Honvéd
- 1973–1975: Békéscsaba
- * Club domestic league appearances and goals

György Babolcsay (26 December 1921 – 13 July 1976) was a Hungarian football player and manager.

== Career ==
=== Playing career ===
Babolcsay played club football for hometown side Budapest Honvéd FC also known as Kispesti AC. He also represented the Hungary national side, and earned a total of 4caps for the team between 1950 and 1953.

=== Coaching career ===
Babolcsay managed Budapest Honvéd FC, Békéscsaba 1912 Előre SE and Greek club PAOK.
