= Ferenc Puskás Sr. =

Hungarian footballer and manager

Personal information
- Full name: Ferenc Purczeld
- Date of birth: 11 May 1903
- Place of birth: Budapest, Austria-Hungary
- Date of death: 12 June 1952 (aged 49)
- Place of death: Budapest, Hungary
- Position: Centre-half

Senior career*
Years	Team	Apps	(Gls)
- Budapesti MÁVAG SK
1926–1927	Vasas		
1927–1936	Kispest		

Managerial career
- 1945–1947: Kispest
- 1948–1951: Budapest Honvéd
- * Club domestic league appearances and goals

Ferenc Puskás Sr. (born Ferenc Purczeld; 11 May 1903 – 12 June 1952), was a Hungarian football player and manager. He was the father of the legendary Ferenc Puskás Jr., who is commonly referred to as Ferenc Puskás.

== Career ==
During the 1930s, as Ferenc Purczeld, he played as a central defender with Kispest A.C. Among his teammates at that club were Rezső Rozgonyi and Rezső Somlai, who both represented Hungary at the 1934 World Cup. In 1937 he changed his family name to Puskás. After retiring as a player he became a coach at Kispest AC, where he was an early mentor to both his son, Ferenc Jr. and József Bozsik. He initially registered his son as a youth player using the pseudonym Kovács Miklós to help get around the minimum age rules.

In the 1940s, Puskás became the senior coach at Kispest AC. During two spells at the club, he managed the senior team in over 200 games. After his first period ended in 1947, he was replaced by Béla Guttmann. However Guttman fell out with Ferenc Jr. and walked out, allowing Ferenc Sr. to return. During his second tenure, Hungary became a communist state, and Kispest were then taken over by the Hungarian Ministry of Defence and became the Hungarian Army team. The club was renamed Budapest Honvéd SE and Puskás guided the squad – which included Ferenc Jr. and Bozsik – to their first two Hungarian League titles.

== Honours ==
Honvéd

- Hungarian Champions (2): 1949–50 (I), 1950 (II)

== See also ==
- List of association football families
