= SSV Ulm 1846 =

German association football club based in Ulm

SSV Ulm
- Full name: SSV Ulm 1846 FUSSBALL e.V.
- Nickname: Die Spatzen (The Sparrows)
- Founded: 1846; 180 years ago
- Ground: Donaustadion
- Capacity: 19,500
- Chairman: Thomas Oelmeyer
- Manager: Alois Schwartz
- League: Regionalliga Südwest
- 2025–26: 3. Liga, 19th of 20 (relegated)
- Website: ssvulm1846-fussball.de
Home colours	Away colours	Third colours

SSV Ulm 1846 FUSSBALL e.V., commonly known as SSV Ulm 1846 or SSV Ulm, is a German football club based in Ulm, Baden-Württemberg. SSV Ulm 1846 FUSSBALL was formed on 7 March 2009 as new independent club through the separation of the football department from the present-day multi-sports club SSV Ulm 1846 e.V. The team currently plays in Regionalliga Südwest, following back-to-back relegations from both the 2. Bundesliga and 3. Liga.

The club's greatest success has been promotion to the Bundesliga in 1998–99, where it played for just one season. Ulm has also spent eight seasons in the 2. Bundesliga between 1979–80 and 2000–01, most recently playing there in the 2024-25 season.

== History ==
Organised sport in Ulm dates to 1846 with the founding of Turngemeinde Ulm. In the 1939–40 season, four city clubs—Turnerbund Ulm, Turnverein Ulm, Ulmer Fußballverein 1894, and Sportvereinigung Ulm 1839—merged to form TSG Ulm 1846. Separately, on 12 October 1928, the 1. Schwimmverein Ulm and SV Schwaben Ulm combined as 1. Schwimm- und Sportverein Ulm (1. SSV Ulm). On 5 May 1970, TSG Ulm 1846 and 1. SSV Ulm 1928 merged at the Kornhaus to create SSV Ulm 1846, at the time one of Germany's largest multi-sport clubs.

The football section continued under the new umbrella until 2009, when it was spun off as the independent club SSV Ulm 1846 Fußball e.V., while the multi-sport association (SSV Ulm 1846 e.V.) remained in charge of non-football departments and facilities.

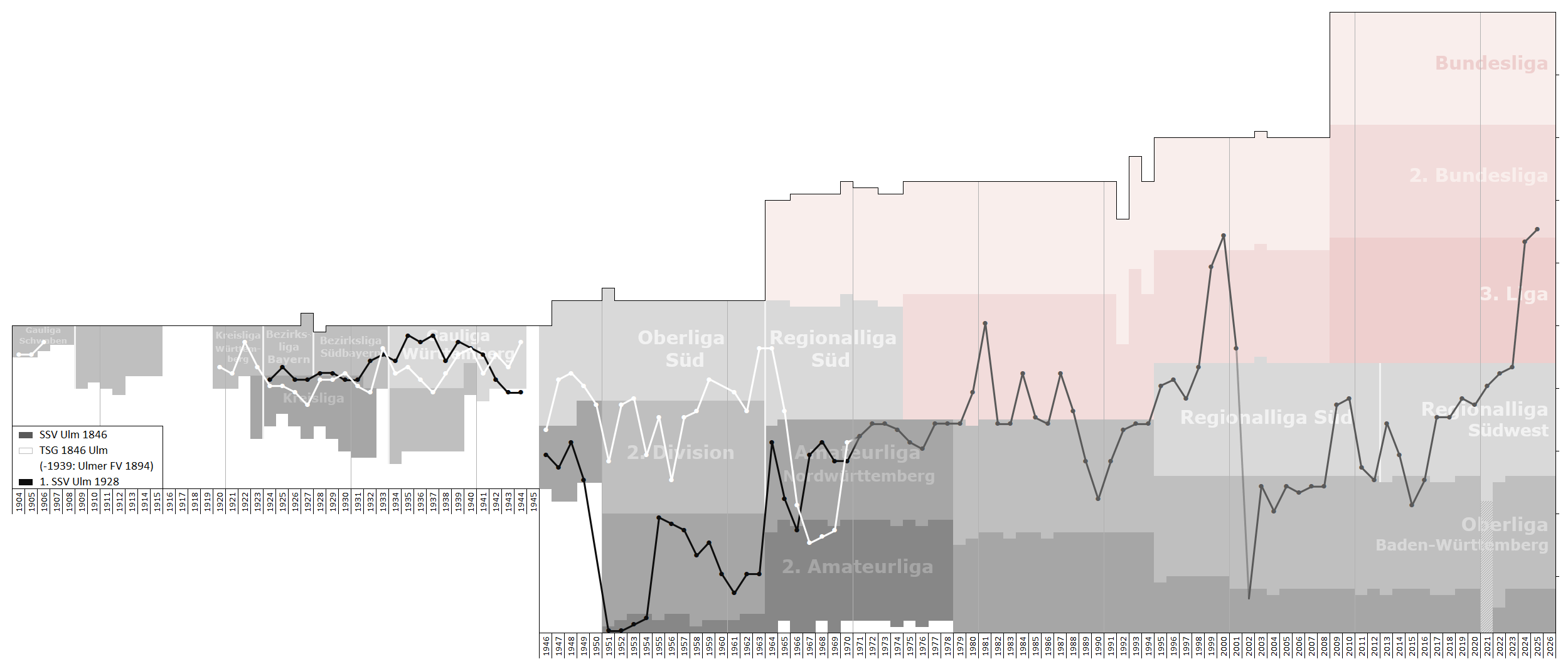
Historical chart of SSV Ulm and predecessors' league performance

=== TSG Ulm 1846 ===
Logo of SSV Ulm 1846

The football section in Ulm was consolidated in 1939 when Turnerbund Ulm, Turnverein Ulm, and Ulmer Fußballverein 1894 combined as TSG Ulm 1846; the new side entered the Gauliga Württemberg for the 1939–40 season and remained at that level until league play ended in 1945. After World War II, the club alternated between the top-flight Oberliga Süd and the 2. Oberliga Süd: TSG played in the Oberliga in 1946–49, 1952–53, 1958–61 and 1962–63, otherwise competing in the second tier. With the creation of the Regionalliga Süd (II) in 1963, TSG qualified on league position and spent two seasons there, finishing eighth in 1963–64 before relegation as 18th in 1964–65 to the third-tier Amateurliga. In 1968, the Radsportvereinigung 1948 Ulm (RSV 1948 Ulm) joined TSG Ulm 1846 as part of the city's multi-sport consolidation.

=== 1. SSV Ulm ===
1. Spiel- und Sportverein Ulm was formed in 1928 and, after two seasons in the Bezirksliga Bayern, joined the Gauliga Württemberg in 1933, well before their future partner, where they earned just mid-table finishes. After the war and leading up to their union with TSG 1846, they played as a third or fourth division side. Finally, in 1970, 1. SSV Ulm merged with TSG 1846 to form SSV Ulm 1846.

=== SSV Ulm 1846 ===
At the time of the merger. both clubs were playing football in the tier III Amateurliga Württemberg and would continue to do so for a nearly a decade. In 1980, the combined side advanced to the 2. Bundesliga Süd and would spend six of the next ten years playing at that level where, except for a fifth-place finish in 1982, their results were well down the table. After another decade in the level III Amateur Oberliga Baden-Württemberg and Regionalliga Süd, 1846 made an unexpected breakthrough after just one season in the 2. Bundesliga with a third-place finish that led to the club's promotion to the top-flight Bundesliga for the 1999–2000 season. Even though the issue was not decided until the last day of the season, Ulm could do no better than a sixteenth-place finish and returned to the second division. The 2000–01 season was an unqualified disaster for the club: they could manage only another sixteenth-place finish and were sent back down to the Regionalliga Süd (III). They were then denied a licence over the chaotic state of their finances which plunged the club down to the fifth tier Verbandsliga Württemberg. Afterwards Ulm worked their way back, to the Oberliga Baden-Württemberg (IV) in 2002, and the Regionalliga in 2008.

=== SSV Ulm 1846 Fußball ===
Following the 2009 European football betting scandal, the club released three allegedly involved players, Davor Kraljević, Marijo Marinović and Dinko Radojević. In January 2011, the club was declared insolvent, and the results of the 2010–11 season were declared void. The club was relegated to the Oberliga Baden-Württemberg but immediately won the 2011–12 title, finishing nine points clear of second-placed VfR Mannheim and earning promotion to the new Regionalliga Südwest.

In May 2014, SSV Ulm 1846 was once again close to insolvency, for the third time in 13 years, requiring €420,000 in financial support before the end of the month to ensure survival. The club eventually entered administration and was relegated back to the Oberliga. After two seasons, SSV Ulm 1846 was promoted to the Regionalliga in May 2016.

On 28 May 2023, SSV Ulm 1846 secured promotion to 3. Liga for the first time from 2023 to 2024, after defeating Barockstadt Fulda-Lehnerz 5–0 and becoming champion of the Regionalliga Südwest.

On 4 May 2024, SSV Ulm 1846 were crowned 3. Liga champions and earned back-to-back promotion to 2. Bundesliga for the 2024–25 season and the first time since 2000–01 season, after defeating Viktoria Köln 2–0.

== Honours ==
=== League ===
- 3. Liga (III)
  - Champions: 2023–24
- Regionalliga Südwest (IV)
  - Champions: 2022–23
- German amateur championship
  - Champions: 1996
- Regionalliga Süd (III)
  - Champions: 1998
- Oberliga Baden-Württemberg (III/IV/V)
  - Champions: 1979, 1982, 1983, 1986, 1993, 1994, 2012, 2016
  - Runners-up: 1992, 2003, 2005, 2007, 2008
- Amateurliga Württemberg (III)
  - Champions: 1946^{‡}, 1950^{‡}, 1955^{†}, 1972, 1973, 1977, 1978
  - Runners-up: 1956^{†}, 1974
- Verbandsliga Württemberg (V)
  - Runners-up: 2002

=== Cup ===
- Württemberg Cup (Tiers III-VII)
  - Winners: 1957^{†}, 1982, 1983, 1992, 1994, 1995, 1997, 2018, 2019, 2020, 2021
  - Runners-up: 1976, 1998, 2000^{¥}, 2001^{¥}, 2006, 2007, 2022

- ^{‡} Won by TSG Ulm 1846.
- ^{†} Won by SSV Ulm.
- ^{¥} Won by reserve team.

== Recent managers ==
Recent managers of the club:

Manager	Start	Finish
Dieter Märkle	1 July 2004	28 November 2004
Marcus Sorg	29 November 2004	6 September 2007
Paul Sauter	1 July 2007	30 June 2008
Janusz Góra	7 September 2007	30 September 2007
Markus Gisdol	1 July 2008	30 June 2009
Manfred Paula	1 July 2009	24 September 2009
Frank Kaspari	25 September 2009	4 October 2009
Ralf Becker	15 October 2009	1 December 2010
Janusz Góra	2 December 2010	30 June 2011
Paul Sauter	1 July 2011	30 June 2012
Stephan Baierl	1 July 2012	13 November 2012
Paul Sauter	14 November 2012	17 October 2013
Oliver Unsöld	18 October 2013	30 June 2014
Stephan Baierl	1 July 2014	15 August 2017
Tobias Flitsch	17 August 2017	30 June 2018
Holger Bachthaler	1 July 2018	30 June 2021
Thomas Wörle	1 July 2021	11 March 2025
Robert Lechleiter	11 March 2025	18 September 2025
Moritz Glasbrenner	18 September 2025	10 November 2025
Pavel Dochev	16 November 2025	30 June 2026
Daniel Jungwirth	1 July 2026	27 September 2026
Alois Schwartz	5 October 2026	Present

== Recent seasons ==
The recent season-by-season performance of the club:

Season	Division	Tier	Position
1999–2000	Bundesliga	I	16th ↓
2000–01	2. Bundesliga	II	16th ↓
2001–02	Verbandsliga Württemberg	V	2nd ↑
2002–03	Oberliga Baden-Württemberg	IV	2nd
2003–04	Oberliga Baden-Württemberg	IV	6th
2004–05	Oberliga Baden-Württemberg	IV	2nd
2005–06	Oberliga Baden-Württemberg	IV	3rd
2006–07	Oberliga Baden-Württemberg	IV	2nd
2007–08	Oberliga Baden-Württemberg	IV	2nd ↑
2008–09	Regionalliga Süd	IV	7th
2009–10	Regionalliga Süd	IV	6th
2010–11	Regionalliga Süd	IV	↓ due to insolvency
2011–12	Oberliga Baden-Württemberg	V	1st ↑
2012–13	Regionalliga Südwest	IV	10th
2013–14	Regionalliga Südwest	IV	15th ↓
2014–15	Oberliga Baden-Württemberg	V	3rd
2015–16	Oberliga Baden-Württemberg	V	1st ↑
2016–17	Regionalliga Südwest	IV	9th
2017–18	Regionalliga Südwest	IV	9th
2018–19	Regionalliga Südwest	IV	6th
2019–20	Regionalliga Südwest	IV	7th
2020–21	Regionalliga Südwest	IV	4th
2021–22	Regionalliga Südwest	IV	2nd
2022–23	Regionalliga Südwest	IV	1st ↑
2023–24	3. Liga	III	1st ↑
2024–25	2. Bundesliga	II	17th ↓
2025–26	3. Liga	III	19th ↓

- With the introduction of the Regionalligas in 1994 and the 3. Liga in 2008 as the new third tier, below the 2. Bundesliga, all leagues below dropped one tier. In 2012, the number of Regionalligas was increased from three to five with all Regionalliga Süd clubs except the Bavarian ones entering the new Regionalliga Südwest.

Key

↑Promoted	↓ Relegated

== Current squad ==
As of 8 September 2026

Note: Flags indicate national team as defined under FIFA eligibility rules; some limited exceptions apply. Players may hold more than one non-FIFA nationality.

No.	Pos.	Nation	Player
1	GK	GER	Radomir Novaković
2	DF	GER	Mattis Hoppe
3	DF	GER	Alexandre Azevedo
4	DF	GER	Daniel Hülsenbusch
5	DF	GER	Johannes Reichert (captain)
6	MF	GER	Benedikt Ehe
7	MF	GER	Benjamin Goller
8	MF	GER	Per Lockl
9	FW	GER	Lucas Röser
10	MF	GER	Oliver Wähling
11	FW	GER	Dennis Chessa
12	GK	GER	Kim Bayer
14	DF	GER	Karl Kempf
16	MF	GER	Simun Birkic
17	MF	GER	Leon Müller

No.	Pos.	Nation	Player
18	MF	GER	Steffen Meuer
19	MF	GER	Christopher Negele
20	DF	GER	Alexander Kopf
21	DF	GER	Marco Gölz
22	MF	GER	Emanuel Taffertshofer
23	FW	JPN	Masaaki Takahara
24	DF	GER	Felix Vater
25	DF	GER	Marcel Seegert
27	DF	GER	Tim Schmidt
28	MF	GER	Mateo Mrden
29	FW	THA	Achitpol Keereerom
30	GK	BEL	Robin Mantel
33	FW	GER	Leander Popp
34	FW	TUR	Halim Eroğlu
37	MF	GER	Moritz Heinrich

=== Out on loan ===
Note: Flags indicate national team as defined under FIFA eligibility rules; some limited exceptions apply. Players may hold more than one non-FIFA nationality.

No. / Pos. / Nation / Player	No. / Pos. / Nation / Player

=== Former players ===
- (Australia) David Zdrilic

== Fans and controversies ==
In the fanscene there are right-wing extremist tendencies and right-wing hooligans. In May 2019, several extremists attacked a Roma family. Four of the perpetrators had connections to the SSV Ulm fan scene. Despite a trial, the perpetrators were initially not banned from the stadium, which is why the club's management was heavily criticized by the Central Council of German Sinti and Roma.

"To ignore this inhuman crime simply stunned us. Imagine if the same incident had occurred against the Jewish minority, then different measures would have been taken by the club's management. The Holocaust clearly also includes the annihilation of half a million Sinti and Roma in Nazi occupied Europe. And the responsibility of a club management must be the same here." – Romani Rose, chairman, Central Council of German Sinti and Roma.

In addition, there are group photos on which, among other things, the Nazi salute is shown.
