= József Pásztor =

Hungarian footballer and manager

Personal information
- Date of birth: 21 March 1954 (age 72)
- Place of birth: Vencsellő, Hungary
- Position: Midfielder

Senior career*
| Years | Team | Apps | (Gls) |
| 1974–1987 | Békéscsaba 1912 Előre | 361 | (45) |

Managerial career
- 1991-1996: Békéscsaba 1912 Előre
- 1997-1998: Békéscsaba 1912 Előre
- 2002: Békéscsaba 1912 Előre
- 2002-2005: Gyulai Termál FC
- 2010-2012: Békéscsaba 1912 Előre
- 2013: Békéscsaba 1912 Előre
- * Club domestic league appearances and goals

József Pásztor (born 20 March 1954) is a Hungarian football retired manager and a former player.

== Career ==
He made record appearances for Békéscsaba 1912 Előre.

== Managerial career ==
=== Békéscsaba ===
In 1991, he was appointed as the manager of Békéscsaba 1912 Előre.

Between 1997 and 2000, he managed Békéscsaba a second time.

=== Orosháza ===
On 1 January 2001, he was appointed as the manager of Orosháza FC. On 8 November 2001, he resigned as the manager.

=== Békéscsaba ===
On 13 December 2001, he was appointed as the manager of Békéscsaba. On 23 August 2002, he resigned from his position.

=== Gyula ===
On 20 January 2004, he was appointed as the manager of Gyulai Termál FC. On 30 June 2005, he resigned.

=== Békéscsaba ===
On 20 April 2010, he was appointed as the manager of Békéscsaba. On 9 June 2012, he resigned and was replaced by László Dajka.

In 2023, he was appointed as the caretaker manager of Békéscsaba.

== Personal life ==
He was awarded with a ring from the may or Békéscsaba for his 60th birthday.
