= Békéscsaba 1912 Előre =

Hungarian football club

Békéscsaba
- Full name: Békéscsaba Előre
- Nickname: Lilák (Purples)
- Founded: 22 October 1912; 114 years ago
- Ground: Kórház utcai Stadion, Békéscsaba
- Capacity: 4,963
- Coordinates: 46.6863°N 21.1063°E
- Chairman: Károly Királyvári
- Manager: Serhiy Kuznetsov
- League: NB II
- 2023–24: NB III; Southeast, 1st of 16 (promoted via play-offs)
- Website: 1912elore.hu
Home colours	Away colours

Békéscsaba 1912 Előre is a Hungarian football club from Békéscsaba, Békés. The club was founded in 1912 as Előre Munkás Testedző Egyesület. Előre translates as Forward in English. The colours of the club are lilac and white. The club currently play in Nemzeti Bajnokság II, the second tier of Hungarian football. The club achieved its greatest success in 1988 when it won the Hungarian Cup competition, defeating Budapest Honvéd FC 3–2 in the final.

Until the end of 2004–05 the club spent a total of 25 seasons in the first Hungarian division, the Nemzeti Bajnokság I. They were promoted back to the top tier in 2015.

== Name changes ==
- 1912: Békéscsabai Előre Munkás Testedző Egyesület
- 1948: Békéscsabai Előre SC
- 1970: Békéscsabai Előre Spartacus SC
- 1991: Békéscsabai Előre FC,
- 2005: Békéscsaba 1912 Előre SE

== History ==
After winning the 1940–41 Körösvidéki I division, they were promoted to the Nemzeti Bajnokság III. In the first season of the third tier of the Hungarian football league system, Békéscsaba finished in the fifth position of the 1941–42 season of the Alföldi group. Therefore, they were promoted to the second tier, Nemzeti Bajnokság II.

In the first season of the Nemzeti Bajnokság II, Békéscsaba finished in the seventh position of the 1942–43 Nemzeti Bajnokság Mátyás group. The 1944–45 season was interrupted by the World War II. After some seasons in lower leagues, Békéscsaba returned to the second tier in the 1946–47 season of the Nemzeti Bajnokság II, finishing in the second position. After spending several season in the second tier, in the 1957–58 season they were relegated to the third division. In the 1962–63 season of the Nemzeti Bajnokság III, they finished in the fourth place and they were promoted to the second tier.

Békéscsaba won the 1968 Nemzeti Bajnokság III season and they were promoted to the Nemzeti Bajnokság II for the first time in the club's history.

Békéscsaba won the 1973–74 Nemzeti Bajnokság II season and they were promoted to the Nemzeti Bajnokság I for the first time in the history of the club. In the 1974–75 Nemzeti Bajnokság I season Békéscsaba finished in the 14th position and they were not relegated. After spending nine consecutive seasons in the top flight, they were relegated in the 1982–83 Nemzeti Bajnokság I season. Békéscsaba won only five matches and lost 18 matches and conceded 75 goals and scored only 41 goals in that season. However, the supporters of the club did not have to wait too long for the return to the top flight since Békéscsaba finished in the third place of the 1983–84 Nemzeti Bajnokság II season and were promoted to the first league.

In the 1982–83 Nemzeti Bajnokság I season Békéscsaba finished in the 16th position and thus were relegated to the second division.

On 13 June 1988, Békécscsaba won the 1987–88 Magyar Kupa season. This feat has been the biggest achievement in the history of the club so far. Békéscsaba beat Budapest Honvéd FC 3–2 in the final at the Tiszaligeti Stadion in Szolnok. Although István Gulyás scored an own goal in the 8th minute, István Csernus scored the equalizer in the 60th minute. In the 69th minute Tibor Gruborovics took the lead. However, László Gyimesi scored the second goal for Honvéd by taking the penalty in the 74th minute. The winning goal was scored by Sándor Csató in the 80th minute.

On 10 August 1988, Békéscsaba played their first international match against Bryne FK in the 1988–89 European Cup Winners' Cup season. The first leg was won by Békéscsaba 3–0 at home. Tibor Gruborovics scored two goals, while Sándor Csató scored one goal. The second leg was won by Byrne 2–1 at the Bryne Stadion, in Bryne on 24 August 1988. In the first round, Békéscsaba lost 2–0 to Sakaryaspor at the Sakarya Atatürk Stadium on 7 September 1988. Although the second leg was won by Békéscsaba 1–0, they were eliminated from the tournament.

Békéscsaba finished in the 15th position of the 1990–91 Nemzeti Bajnokság I season and they were relegated to the second division.

One of the biggest league success was achieved in the 1993–94 Nemzeti Bajnokság I season when the club finished in the third place. The championship was won by Vác FC, while the second place was achieved by Budapest Honvéd FC.

On 9 August 1994, Békéscsaba drew with FK Vardar at the Gradski stadion, Skopje. The second leg was won by Békéscsaba 1–0 at home on 23 August 1994. The only goal was scored by Sándor Csató in the 61st minute. On 13 September 1994, Békéscsaba lost to FC Tekstilshchik Kamyshin 6–1 in Moscow. Although the second leg was won by Békéscsaba 1–0, they were eliminated from the 1994–95 UEFA Cup. The only goal was scored by Sándor Csató in the 76th minute.

Békéscsaba finished in the second position of the 2014–15 Nemzeti Bajnokság II season and they were promoted to the first league. The championship was won by Vasas SC. However, the return to the first division was ephemeral because Békéscsaba finished in the 12th place of the 2015–16 Nemzeti Bajnokság I season and they were relegated to the second division.

On 16 September 2020, Sándor Preisinger was appointed as the head coach of the club. On 7 September 2021, Preisinger was sacked after poor performance in the season. Békéscsaba lost three matches and drew only three times in their first six matches of the 2020–21 Nemzeti Bajnokság II season.

On 19 April 2022, Gábor Brlázs was appointed as the interim coach of the club. However, on 26 May 2022, it was confirmed that he remained the head coach of the club.

On 13 April 2023, József Pásztor was appointed as the head coach of the club.

Békéscsaba finished in the 19th position of the 2022–23 Nemzeti Bajnokság II season and were relegated to the Nemzeti Bajnokság III.

On 12 June 2023, the club's icon, Sándor Csató, was appointed as the head coach.

In 2023–24, Békéscsaba secure champions of Nemzeti Bajnokság III Southwest Group and remain in third tier but due to dissolve Haladás, the club promoted to NB II from next season.

== Stadium ==
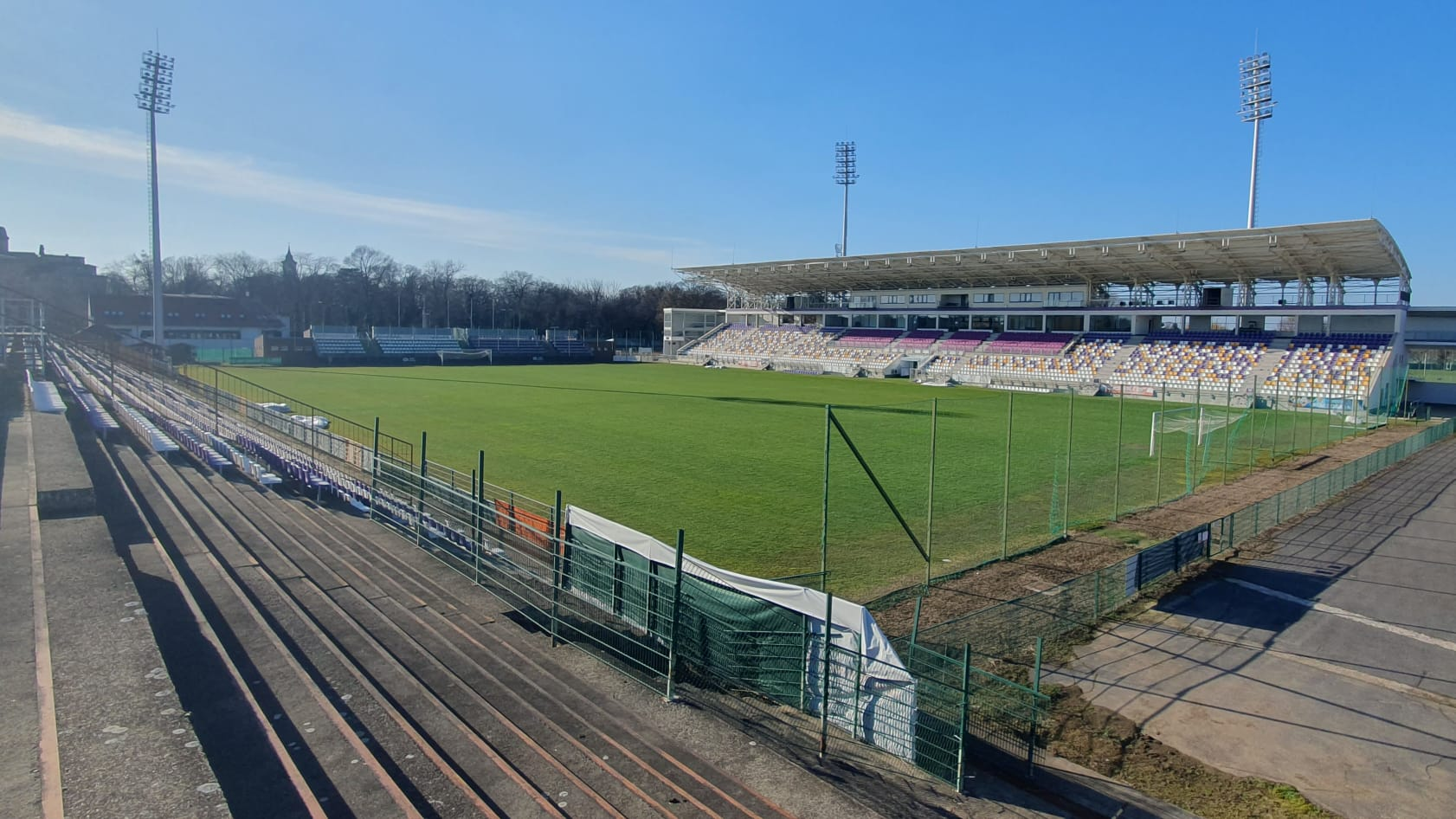
Kórház utcai Stadion

Békéscsabai Előre play at the Kórház utcai Stadion situated in Békéscsaba, Hungary. Its capacity is 4,963 and it was built in 1974.

On 31 December 2015, it was announced that a new covered stand would be built with VIP sectors.

On 16 March 2017, it was published on Magyar Építók that the reconstruction would be finished in 2017. Floodlight will also be installed in the new stadium.

On 2 May 2019, Tamás Bod wrote an article on the stadium reconstruction in Magyar Narancs. According to the initial plans, the renovation should have been finished by 2017. However, even in 2019, the reconstruction has not been finished and the final costs cannot be exactly determined. On 28 April 2022, it was announced that the stadium would be renovated by 7 billion forints.

Békéscsaba were forced to play their 2023–24 Magyar Kupa match in Körösladány because the turf of the stadium became infected.

== Current squad ==
As of 20 February 2026. Note: Flags indicate national team as defined under FIFA eligibility rules; some limited exceptions apply. Players may hold more than one non-FIFA nationality.

No.	Pos.	Nation	Player
3	DF	HUN	Gergő Kovács
5	MF	HUN	Bálint Szabó
6	MF	HUN	Gergő Nagy
7	MF	HUN	Filip Borsos
8	DF	HUN	Dávid Avramucz
9	FW	HUN	Richárd Zsolnai
10	MF	HUN	Kevin Balla
11	MF	HUN	Ákos Ésik (on loan from Kisvárda)
12	GK	HUN	János Takács
16	MF	HUN	Márk Hodonicki
17	MF	HUN	György Hursán
18	MF	HUN	András Pusztai
19	DF	ROU	Roland Mikló
22	DF	HUN	Hunor Kuzma

No.	Pos.	Nation	Player
23	DF	HUN	Ádám Viczián
25	DF	HUN	István Albert
27	FW	HUN	Nándor Kóródi
28	DF	HUN	Dávid Kelemen
29	MF	HUN	Bence Daru
33	DF	HUN	Gergő Major
37	DF	HUN	Máté Kotula (on loan from Kecskemét)
40	MF	HUN	Bence Pintér
70	MF	HUN	Kristóf Sármány
72	FW	HUN	Áron Papp
73	GK	HUN	Patrik Tóth
77	MF	HUN	Róbert Kővári
88	MF	HUN	Richárd Nagy
90	GK	HUN	Dániel Póser

=== Out on loan ===
Note: Flags indicate national team as defined under FIFA eligibility rules; some limited exceptions apply. Players may hold more than one non-FIFA nationality.

No.	Pos.	Nation	Player
78	MF	HUN	Patrik Pelles (at Tiszafüred VSE until 30 June 2026)

== Honours ==
=== League ===
- Nemzeti Bajnokság II:
  - Winners (3): 1945, 1991–92, 2001–02
- Nemzeti Bajnokság III:
  - Winners (4): 1968, 2005–06, 2007–08, 2023–24
- Hungarian Cup
  - Winners (1): 1987–88

== Seasons ==
=== League positions ===
As of 26 July 2025

- Between 1998–99 and 2001–02 the second tier league called NB I/B.

== European Cup history ==
=== UEFA Cup Winners' Cup ===
Season	Competition	Round	Country	Club	Home	Away	Aggregate
1988–89	UEFA Cup Winners' Cup	Preliminary Round	(Norway)	Bryne	3–0	1–2	4–2
		1. Round	(Turkey)	Sakaryaspor	1–0	0–2	1–2

=== UEFA Intertoto Cup ===
Season	Competition	Round	Country	Club	Home	Away	Aggregate
1995	UEFA Intertoto Cup	Group 4, 1st game	(Portugal)	União de Leiria	2–2		
		Group 4, 2nd game	(Denmark)	Næstved		3–3	
		Group 4, 3rd game	(Wales)	Ton Pentre	4–0		
		Group 4, 4th game	(Netherlands)	Heerenveen		0–4	

=== UEFA Cup ===
Season	Competition	Round	Country	Club	Home	Away	Aggregate
1994–95	UEFA Cup	Preliminary Round	(North Macedonia)	FK Vardar	1–0	1–1	2–1
		1. Round	(Russia)	Tekstilshchik	1–0	1–6	2–6

== See also ==
- List of Békéscsaba 1912 Előre managers
- List of Békéscsaba 1912 Előre seasons
