= 2021–22 Budapest Honvéd FC season =

Budapest Honvéd FC
2021–22 season
- Chairman: Zoltán Bozó and Dániel Medelényi
- Manager: Ferenc Horváth (until 2 February 2022); Nebojša Vignjević
- NB 1: 9th
- Magyar Kupa: Quarter-final
- Top goalscorer: League: Nenad Lukić (15); All: Nenad Lukić (17)
Home colours	Away colours	Third colours

The 2021–22 season is Budapest Honvéd FC's 111th competitive season, 17th consecutive season in the OTP Bank Liga and 112th year in existence as a football club.

== Squad ==
As of 24 July 2021

Note: Flags indicate national team as defined under FIFA eligibility rules; some limited exceptions apply. Players may hold more than one non-FIFA nationality.

No.	Pos.	Nation	Player
2	DF	BEL	Mohamed Mezghrani
3	DF	BRA	Talys
4	DF	POL	Lukas Klemenz
6	MF	FRA	Zinédine Machach (on loan from Napoli)
7	DF	HUN	Bence Batik
8	MF	HUN	Patrik Hidi (captain)
9	FW	HUN	Márton Eppel
11	MF	HUN	Donát Zsótér
14	FW	HUN	Dominik Nagy
17	FW	HUN	Norbert Balogh
20	GK	HUN	Péter Szappanos
21	FW	HUN	Lukács Bőle
22	DF	HUN	Krisztián Tamás

No.	Pos.	Nation	Player
23	MF	HUN	Bence Banó-Szabó
25	DF	CRO	Ivan Lovrić
27	FW	SRB	Nenad Lukić
30	MF	ESP	Nono
33	MF	HUN	Nikolasz Kovács
35	MF	SRB	Dušan Pantelić
36	DF	HUN	Botond Baráth
66	GK	HUN	Attila Berla
70	MF	HUN	Milán Májer
77	MF	HUN	Gergő Nagy
83	GK	HUN	Tomáš Tujvel
98	FW	HUN	Gellért Dúzs

== Transfers ==
=== Summer ===
In: Note: Flags indicate national team as defined under FIFA eligibility rules; some limited exceptions apply. Players may hold more than one non-FIFA nationality.

No.	Pos.	Nation	Player
3	DF	BRA	Talys (loan from (Croatia) Osijek)
6	MF	FRA	Zinédine Machach (loan from (Italy) Napoli)
20	GK	HUN	Péter Szappanos (from Mezőkövesd)
27	FW	SRB	Nenad Lukić (from (Serbia) Bačka Topola)
30	MF	ESP	Nono (from (Slovakia) Slovan Bratislava)
33	MF	HUN	Nikolasz Kovács (loan return from Ajka)
35	MF	SRB	Dušan Pantelić (from (Serbia) Radnički Niš)
70	MF	HUN	Milán Májer (loan return from Győr)
98	GK	HUN	Gellért Dúzs (from Budapest Honvéd II)
—	FW	HUN	Dominik Cipf (loan return from Siófok)
—	FW	HUN	Bálint Tömösvári (loan return from Siófok)
—	DF	HUN	Attila Temesvári (loan return from Győr)
—	DF	HUN	Milán Horváth (loan return from Siófok)
—	FW	HUN	Kristóf Tóth-Gábor (loan return from Kazincbarcika)
—	DF	MDA	Artur Crăciun (loan return from (Moldova) FC Sfîntul Gheorghe)

Out: Note: Flags indicate national team as defined under FIFA eligibility rules; some limited exceptions apply. Players may hold more than one non-FIFA nationality.

No.	Pos.	Nation	Player
1	GK	UKR	Oleksandr Nad
3	DF	NGR	Eke Uzoma (to Tiszakécske)
18	GK	HUN	András Horváth (loan to Budafok)
24	MF	BIH	Đorđe Kamber (to Budapest Honvéd II)
27	MF	HUN	Norbert Szendrei (to Fehérvár)
29	FW	MLI	Boubacar Traoré (loan to (United States) Sporting Kansas City II)
30	DF	ALB	Naser Aliji
31	DF	HUN	Barna Kesztyűs (to Paks)
37	MF	HUN	Bertalan Bocskay (loan to (Serbia) Bačka Topola)
82	FW	HUN	Dávid László (loan to Budafok)
92	MF	HUN	Dominik Kocsis (loan to Diósgyőr)
99	FW	HUN	Kristóf Tóth-Gábor (loan to Szombathelyi Haladás)
—	DF	ROU	Raul Palmeș (to (Romania) Concordia Chiajna)
—	DF	MDA	Artur Crăciun (loan to (Bulgaria) Lokomotiv Plovdiv)
—	DF	HUN	Milán Horváth (loan to Siófok)
—	FW	HUN	Bálint Tömösvári (to Szolnok)
—	FW	HUN	Dominik Cipf (loan to Siófok)
—	DF	HUN	Attila Temesvári (to Szeged)

=== Winter ===
In: Note: Flags indicate national team as defined under FIFA eligibility rules; some limited exceptions apply. Players may hold more than one non-FIFA nationality.

No.	Pos.	Nation	Player
2	DF	SRB	Marko Petković (from (Serbia) Bačka Topola)
9	FW	SRB	Dejan Dražić (loan from (Slovakia) Slovan Bratislava)
47	MF	UKR	Oleksandr Petrusenko (from (Ukraine) Minaj)
—	MF	GHA	Mohammed Kadiri (loan from (Ukraine) Dynamo Kyiv)
—	RW	ISL	Viðar Ari Jónsson (from (Norway) Sandefjord)
—	DF	ALB	Albi Doka (loan from (Croatia) Gorica)

Out: Note: Flags indicate national team as defined under FIFA eligibility rules; some limited exceptions apply. Players may hold more than one non-FIFA nationality.

No.	Pos.	Nation	Player
2	DF	BEL	Mohamed Mezghrani (to Puskás Akadémia)
3	DF	BRA	Talys (loan return to (Croatia) Osijek)
9	FW	HUN	Márton Eppel (to Diósgyőr)
17	FW	HUN	Norbert Balogh (loan to (Slovakia) Dunajská Streda)
30	MF	ESP	Nono (to (Saudi Arabia) Damac)
33	MF	HUN	Nikolasz Kovács (to Paks)

== Competitions ==
=== Overview ===
Competition	First match	Last match	Starting round	Final position	Record							
Competition	First match	Last match	Starting round	Final position	Pld	W	D	L	GF	GA	GD	Win %
Nemzeti Bajnokság I	31 July 2021	15 May 2022	Matchday 1	9th	33	10	8	15	48	51	−3	30.30
Hungarian Cup	19 September 2021	1 March 2022	Round of 64	Quarter-final	4	3	0	1	8	3	+5	75.00
Total					37	13	8	16	56	54	+2	35.14

Last updated: 15 May 2022
Source: Competitions

=== Nemzeti Bajnokság I ===
==== League table ====
Pos	Team	Pld	W	D	L	GF	GA	GD	Pts	Qualification or relegation
7	Debrecen	33	10	9	14	45	52	−7	39	
8	Zalaegerszeg	33	10	9	14	44	58	−14	39	
9	Honvéd	33	10	8	15	48	51	−3	38	
10	Mezőkövesd	33	10	8	15	37	49	−12	38	
11	MTK (R)	33	9	9	15	28	50	−22	36	Relegation to the Nemzeti Bajnokság II

Source: Hungarian Football Federation (in Hungarian), Soccerway
Rules for classification: 1) Points; 2) Matches won; 3) Goal difference; 4) Goals scored; 5) Head-to-head points; 6) Head-to-head goal difference; 7) Head-to-head away goals scored; 8) Fair play ranking; 9) Drawing of lots.
(R) Relegated

==== Results summary ====
Overall								Home						Away					
Pld	W	D	L	GF	GA	GD	Pts	W	D	L	GF	GA	GD	W	D	L	GF	GA	GD
33	10	8	15	48	51	−3	38	5	5	6	24	22	+2	5	3	9	24	29	−5

Last updated: 15 May 2022.
Source: Soccerway

==== Results by round ====
Round	1	2	3	4	5	6	7	8	9	10	11	12	13	14	15	16	17	18	19	20	21	22	23	24	25	26	27	28	29	30	31	32	33
Ground	H	A	A	H	A	H	A	H	A	H	A	A	H	H	A	H	A	H	A	H	A	H	H	A	A	H	A	H	A	H	A	H	A
Result	L	L	D	W	W	L	W	W	L	L	L	L	W	L	W	D	L	L	L	W	D	D	W	L	W	D	L	L	D	D	L	D	W
Position	12	12	12	10	6	8	4	4	6	8	8	8	7	7	6	6	8	8	9	8	9	9	7	8	7	8	9	10	10	10	10	10	9

Updated to match(es) played on 15 May 2022. Source: Matches
A = Away; H = Home; W = Win; D = Draw; L = Loss

==== Matches ====
31 July 2021 1	Budapest Honvéd	1–4	Debrecen	Budapest
20:20 CEST	Bőle 37'	Report	Dzsudzsák 60' (pen.); Bárány 65'; Bévárdi 81'; Ugrai 90+5'	Stadium: Bozsik Stadion; Attendance: 3,257; Referee: Tamás Bognár

7 August 2021 2	MTK Budapest	1–0	Budapest Honvéd	Budapest
20:00 CEST	Grozav 19'	Report		Stadium: Hidegkuti Nándor Stadion; Attendance: 2,831; Referee: Ferenc Karakó

15 August 2021 3	Újpest	1–1	Budapest Honvéd	Budapest
20:00 CEST	Katona 34'	Report	Lukić 60' (pen.)	Stadium: Szusza Ferenc Stadion; Attendance: 2,025; Referee: Balázs Berke

21 August 2021 4	Budapest Honvéd	3–1	Paks	Budapest
20:30 CEST	D. Nagy 20', 57'; Lukić 47'	Report	Hahn 30' (pen.)	Stadium: Bozsik Aréna; Attendance: 2,411; Referee: Csaba Pintér

27 August 2021 5	Zalaegerszeg	1–3	Budapest Honvéd	Zalaegerszeg
20:00 CEST	Serafimov 75'	Report	Lukić 9'; Hidi 13'; Tamás 70'	Stadium: ZTE Arena; Attendance: 1,862; Referee: Péter Antal

11 September 2021 6	Budapest Honvéd	0–1	Ferencváros	Felcsút
14:45 CEST		Report	Nguen 16'	Stadium: Pancho Aréna; Attendance: 4,046; Referee: Ferenc Karakó

25 September 2021 7	Gyirmót	2–4	Budapest Honvéd	Győr
20:00 CEST	Simon 15', 57'	Report	Tamás 12'; D. Nagy 21'; Lukić 25', 48'	Stadium: Ménfői úti Stadion; Attendance: 2,381; Referee: József Erdős

1 October 2021 8	Budapest Honvéd	2–1	Kisvárda	Bozsik Stadion
20:00 CEST	Klemenz 6'; Machach 90+3'	Report	Tamás 2' (o.g.)	Stadium: Budapest; Attendance: 2,339; Referee: Gergő Bogár

16 October 2021 9	Fehérvár	2–1	Budapest Honvéd	Székesfehérvár
19:30 CEST	Zivzivadze 26'; Petryak 55'	Report	Batik 60'	Stadium: MOL Aréna Sóstó; Attendance: 2,914; Referee: Balázs Berke

24 October 2021 10	Budapest Honvéd	2–3	Mezőkövesd	Bozsik Stadion
15:45 CEST	Nono 69'; Lukić 82'	Report	Vojtuš 7'; Madarász 85'; Cseri 90+3' (pen.)	Stadium: Budapest; Attendance: 3,253; Referee: Tamás Bognár

31 October 2021 11	Puskás Akadémia	3–1	Budapest Honvéd	Felcsút
17:00 CET	Plšek 47', 71' (pen.); Mezghrani 87' (o.g.)	Report	Nono 17'	Stadium: Pancho Aréna; Attendance: 1,500; Referee: Gergő Bogár

6 November 2021 12	Debrecen	5–3	Budapest Honvéd	Debrecen
17:00 CET	Dzsudzsák 36' (pen.), 59'; Ugrai 56'; Deslandes 67'; Németh 69'	Report	Lukić 25' (pen.); Bőle 29', 46'	Stadium: Nagyerdei Stadion; Attendance: 3,170; Referee: Ferenc Karakó

21 November 2021 13	Budapest Honvéd	3–0	MTK Budapest	Bozsik Stadion
19:45 CET	Lukić 48', 90'; D. Nagy 68' (pen.)	Report		Stadium: Budapest; Attendance: 2,156; Referee: Csaba Pintér

27 November 2021 14	Budapest Honvéd	1–2	Újpest	Bozsik Stadion
19:30 CET	Hidi 35'	Report	Bjeloš 80'; Viana 90+1'	Stadium: Budapest; Attendance: 3,088; Referee: István Vad

3 December 2021 15	Paks	2–3	Budapests Honvéd	Paks
20:00 CET	Ádám 6', 44' (pen.)	Report	Lukić 36', 90+5' (pen.); Hidi 47'	Stadium: Fehérvári úti Stadion; Attendance: 1,280; Referee: Balázs Berke

11 December 2021 16	Budapest Honvéd	2–2	Zalaegerszeg	Bozsik Stadion
17:15 CET	Lukić 5'; Zsótér 45'	Report	Koszta 63'; Lesjak 73'	Stadium: Budapest; Attendance: 2,082; Referee: József Erdős

18 December 2021 17	Ferencváros	1–0	Budapest Honvéd	Budapest
14:45 CET	Uzuni 90+2'	Report		Stadium: Groupama Arena; Attendance: 7,011; Referee: Zoltán Iványi

29 January 2022 18	Budapest Honvéd	0–1	Gyirmót	Bozsik Stadion
19:30 CET		Report	Varga 70' (pen.)	Stadium: Budapest; Attendance: 1,880; Referee: Ádám Farkas

5 February 2022 19	Kisvárda	3–2	Budapest Honvéd	Kisvárda
14:45 CET	Kravchenko 11'; Bumba 66'; Melnyk 68'	Report	Batik 3'; Zsótér 29'	Stadium: Várkerti Stadion; Attendance: 2,100; Referee: Tamás Bognár

13 February 2022 20	Budapest Honvéd	3–1	Fehérvár	Budapest
14:15 CET	D. Nagy 55', 90+1'; Petrusenko 86'	Report	Žulj 49'	Stadium: Bozsik Aréna; Attendance: 3,162; Referee: Sándor Andó-Szabó

18 February 2022 21	Mezőkövesd	0–0	Budapest Honvéd	Mezőkövesd
20:00 CET		Report		Stadium: Mezőkövesdi Városi Stadion; Attendance: 1,376; Referee: Bence Csonka

26 February 2022 22	Budapest Honvéd	0–0	Puskás Akadémia	Budapest
17:00 CET		Report		Stadium: Bozsik Aréna; Attendance: 2,472; Referee: József Erdős

5 March 2022 23	Budapest Honvéd	4–2	Debrecen	Budapest
19:30 CET	D. Nagy 22'; Batik 43'; Petković 75'; Traoré 90'	Report	Ugrai 56'; Do. Babunski 58'	Stadium: Bozsik Stadion; Attendance: 2,624; Referee: István Vad

12 March 2022 24	MTK Budapest	1–0	Budapest Honvéd	Budapest
19:30 CET	Grozav 76'	Report		Stadium: Hidegkuti Nándor Stadion; Attendance: 2,918; Referee: Sándor Andó-Szabó

20 March 2022 25	Újpest	0–2	Budapest Honvéd	Budapest
18:30 CET		Report	Zsótér 43'; Machach 81'	Stadium: Szusza Ferenc Stadion; Attendance: 5,423; Referee: Balázs Berke

2 April 2022 26	Budapest Honvéd	1–1	Paks	Budapest
19:30 CEST	Machach 61'	Report	Ádám 71' (pen.)	Stadium: Bozsik Stadion; Attendance: 2,779; Referee: Tamás Bognár

8 April 2022 27	Zalaegerszeg	3–1	Budapest Honvéd	Zalaegerszeg
20:00 CEST	Lesjak 32'; Tajti 47' (pen.); Špoljarić 85'	Report	Lukić 62' (pen.)	Stadium: ZTE Arena; Attendance: 2,409; Referee: Ferenc Karakó

16 April 2022 28	Budapest Honvéd	1–2	Ferencváros	Budapest
19:30 CEST	Zsótér 35'	Report	R. Mmaee 8'; Zachariassen 90+1'	Stadium: Bozsik Aréna; Attendance: 4,062; Referee: Sándor Andó-Szabó

24 April 2022 29	Gyirmót	1–1	Budapest Honvéd	Győr
19:30 CEST	Hasani 28'	Report	Bőle 21'	Stadium: Ménfői úti Stadion; Attendance: 1,462; Referee: István Vad

30 April 2022 30	Budapest Honvéd	1–1	Kisvárda	Budapest
17:00 CEST	Lukić 8'	Report	Bumba 85'	Stadium: Bozsik Aréna; Attendance: 3,358; Referee: Csaba Pintér

3 May 2022 31	Fehérvár	2–0	Budapest Honvéd	Székesfehérvár
18:30 CEST	Dárdai 25'; Kodro 46'	Report		Stadium: MOL Aréna Sóstó; Attendance: 2,527; Referee: Balázs Berke

7 May 2022 32	Budapest Honvéd	0–0	Mezőkövesd	Budapest
17:00 CEST	Machach (yellow card) 25' (yellow-red card) 38'	Report		Stadium: Bozsik Aréna; Attendance: 3,155; Referee: Ferenc Karakó

15 May 2022 33	Puskás Akadémia	1–2	Budapest Honvéd	Felcsút
16:00 CEST	Favorov 45+1'	Report	Lukić 5'; Zsótér 14'	Stadium: Pancho Aréna; Attendance: 3,000; Referee: István Vad

=== Hungarian Cup ===
19 September 2021 Round of 64	Nyíregyháza	1–5	Budapest Honvéd	Balmazújváros
18:00 CEST	Banyoi 89'	Report	Balogh 26', 57'; Baráth 38'; Eppel 70'; Batik 81'	Stadium: Városi Sportpálya; Attendance: 1,000; Referee: Bence Csonka

27 October 2021 Round of 32	Zalaegerszeg	0–1 (a.e.t.)	Budapest Honvéd	Zalaegerszeg
19:30 CEST		Report	Nono 109'	Stadium: ZTE Arena; Attendance: 713; Referee: Csaba Pintér

9 February 2022 Round of 16	Kecskemét	1–2	Budapest Honvéd	Kecskemét
17:15 CET	Belényesi 51'	Report	Lukić 60', 78' (pen.)	Stadium: Széktói Stadion; Attendance: 2,800; Referee: Bence Csonka

1 March 2022 Quarter-final	Budapest Honvéd	0–1	Ferencváros	Budapest
20:00 CET		Report	Nguen 23'	Stadium: Bozsik Aréna; Attendance: 3,701; Referee: Balázs Berke

=== Appearances and goals ===
Last updated on 15 May 2022.

No.	Pos	Nat	Player	Total		OTP Bank Liga		Hungarian Cup	
No.	Pos	Nat	Player	Apps	Goals	Apps	Goals	Apps	Goals
2	DF	(Serbia) SRB	Marko Petković	13	0	12	0	1	0
4	DF	(Poland) POL	Lukas Klemenz	18	1	17	1	1	0
5	DF	(Israel) ISR	Nir Bardea	2	0	1	0	1	0
6	MF	(France) FRA	Zinédine Machach	24	3	21	3	3	0
7	DF	(Hungary) HUN	Bence Batik	32	4	28	3	4	1
8	MF	(Hungary) HUN	Patrik Hidi	36	3	32	3	4	0
9	FW	(Serbia) SRB	Dejan Dražić	12	0	10	0	2	0
11	MF	(Hungary) HUN	Donát Zsótér	34	5	32	5	2	0
14	MF	(Hungary) HUN	Dominik Nagy	27	7	23	7	4	0
17	FW	(Hungary) HUN	Norbert Balogh	15	2	13	0	2	2
19	DF	(Albania) ALB	Albi Doka	14	0	13	0	1	0
20	GK	(Hungary) HUN	Péter Szappanos	32	-48	30	-47	2	-1
21	MF	(Hungary) HUN	Lukács Bőle	25	4	22	4	3	0
22	DF	(Hungary) HUN	Krisztián Tamás	32	2	29	2	3	0
23	MF	(Hungary) HUN	Bence Banó-Szabó	5	0	5	0	0	0
25	DF	(Croatia) CRO	Ivan Lovrić	29	0	25	0	4	0
27	FW	(Serbia) SRB	Nenad Lukić	35	17	32	15	3	2
28	FW	(Iceland) ISL	Viðar Ari Jónsson	7	0	6	0	1	0
29	FW	(Mali) MLI	Boubacar Traoré	13	1	12	1	1	0
33	MF	(Hungary) HUN	Nikolasz Kovács	2	0	1	0	1	0
34	FW	(Barbados) BRB	Thierry Gale	9	0	8	0	1	0
35	MF	(Serbia) SRB	Dušan Pantelić	26	0	24	0	2	0
36	DF	(Hungary) HUN	Botond Baráth	18	1	15	0	3	1
42	MF	(Ghana) GHA	Mohammed Kadiri	10	0	9	0	1	0
47	MF	(Ukraine) UKR	Oleksandr Petrusenko	14	1	12	1	2	0
70	MF	(Hungary) HUN	Milán Májer	11	0	10	0	1	0
77	MF	(Hungary) HUN	Gergő Nagy	18	0	16	0	2	0
83	GK	(Slovakia) SVK	Tomáš Tujvel	5	-6	3	-4	2	-2
84	FW	(Hungary) HUN	Zalán Kerezsi	6	0	5	0	1	0
95	MF	(Hungary) HUN	Tamás Szűcs	1	0	1	0	0	0
Youth players:
66	GK	(Hungary) HUN	Attila Berla	0	0	0	-0	0	-0
75	DF	(Hungary) HUN	Balázs Feledy	0	0	0	0	0	0
85	MF	(Hungary) HUN	Gergő Irimiás	0	0	0	0	0	0
89	GK	(Hungary) HUN	Levente Schrankó	0	0	0	-0	0	-0
90	GK	(Hungary) HUN	Márk Gyetván	0	0	0	-0	0	-0
93	MF	(Hungary) HUN	Noel Keresztes	1	0	0	0	1	0
96	DF	(Hungary) HUN	Tibor Szabó	0	0	0	0	0	0
97	DF	(Hungary) HUN	Barna Benczenleitner	0	0	0	0	0	0
98	GK	(Hungary) HUN	Gellért Dúzs	0	0	0	-0	0	-0
Out to loan:
99	FW	(Hungary) HUN	Kristóf Tóth-Gábor	0	0	0	0	0	0
Players no longer at the club:
2	DF	(Algeria) ALG	Mohamed Mezghrani	7	0	7	0	0	0
3	DF	(Brazil) BRA	Talys	5	0	3	0	2	0
9	FW	(Hungary) HUN	Márton Eppel	14	1	12	0	2	1
30	MF	(Spain) ESP	Nono	18	3	16	2	2	1

=== Top scorers ===
Includes all competitive matches. The list is sorted by shirt number when total goals are equal.

Last updated on 15 May 2022

Position	Nation	Number	Name	OTP Bank Liga	Hungarian Cup	Total
1	(Serbia)	27	Nenad Lukić	15	2	17
2	(Hungary)	14	Dominik Nagy	7	0	7
3	(Hungary)	11	Donát Zsótér	5	0	5
4	(Hungary)	21	Lukács Bőle	4	0	4
5	(Hungary)	7	Bence Batik	3	1	4
6	(Hungary)	8	Patrik Hidi	3	0	3
7	(France)	6	Zinédine Machach	3	0	3
8	(Spain)	30	Nono	2	1	3
9	(Hungary)	22	Krisztián Tamás	2	0	2
10	(Hungary)	17	Norbert Balogh	0	2	2
11	(Poland)	4	Lukas Klemenz	1	0	1
12	(Ukraine)	47	Oleksandr Petrusenko	1	0	1
13	(Serbia)	2	Marko Petković	1	0	1
14	(Mali)	29	Boubacar Traoré	1	0	1
15	(Hungary)	36	Botond Baráth	0	1	1
16	(Hungary)	9	Márton Eppel	0	1	1
/	/	/	Own Goals	0	0	0
			TOTALS	48	8	56

=== Disciplinary record ===
Includes all competitive matches. Players with 1 card or more included only.

Last updated on 15 May 2022

Position	Nation	Number	Name	OTP Bank Liga		Hungarian Cup		Total (Hu Total)	
Position	Nation	Number	Name	Yellow card	Red card	Yellow card	Red card	Yellow card	Red card
DF	(Serbia)	2	Marko Petković	1	1	0	0	1 (1)	1 (1)
DF	(Algeria)	2	Mohamed Mezghrani	1	0	0	0	1 (1)	0 (0)
DF	(Poland)	4	Lukas Klemenz	4	1	0	0	4 (4)	1 (1)
DF	(Israel)	5	Nir Bardea	0	1	0	0	0 (0)	1 (1)
MF	(France)	6	Zinédine Machach	2	1	2	0	4 (2)	1 (1)
DF	(Hungary)	7	Bence Batik	4	1	1	0	5 (4)	1 (1)
MF	(Hungary)	8	Patrik Hidi	2	0	0	0	2 (2)	0 (0)
FW	(Hungary)	9	Márton Eppel	3	0	0	0	3 (3)	0 (0)
FW	(Serbia)	9	Dejan Dražić	0	0	1	0	1 (0)	0 (0)
MF	(Hungary)	11	Donát Zsótér	6	0	0	0	6 (6)	0 (0)
MF	(Hungary)	14	Dominik Nagy	5	1	0	0	5 (5)	1 (1)
FW	(Hungary)	17	Norbert Balogh	1	0	0	0	1 (1)	0 (0)
DF	(Albania)	19	Albi Doka	2	0	0	0	2 (2)	0 (0)
GK	(Hungary)	20	Péter Szappanos	3	0	0	0	3 (3)	0 (0)
DF	(Hungary)	22	Krisztián Tamás	1	0	1	0	2 (1)	0 (0)
DF	(Croatia)	25	Ivan Lovrić	11	0	0	0	11 (11)	0 (0)
FW	(Serbia)	27	Nenad Lukić	5	0	0	0	5 (5)	0 (0)
FW	(Mali)	29	Boubacar Traoré	0	0	1	0	1 (0)	0 (0)
MF	(Spain)	30	Nono	5	1	0	0	5 (5)	1 (1)
FW	(Barbados)	34	Thierry Gale	1	0	0	0	1 (1)	0 (0)
MF	(Serbia)	35	Dušan Pantelić	5	0	1	0	6 (5)	0 (0)
DF	(Hungary)	36	Botond Baráth	3	1	0	0	3 (3)	1 (1)
MF	(Ukraine)	47	Oleksandr Petrusenko	2	0	1	0	3 (2)	0 (0)
MF	(Hungary)	70	Milán Májer	1	0	0	0	1 (1)	0 (0)
MF	(Hungary)	77	Gergő Nagy	2	0	0	0	2 (2)	0 (0)
GK	(Slovakia)	83	Tomáš Tujvel	0	0	1	0	1 (0)	0 (0)
			TOTALS	69	8	9	0	78 (69)	8 (8)

=== Clean sheets ===
Last updated on 15 May 2022

Position	Nation	Number	Name	OTP Bank Liga	Hungarian Cup	Total
1	(Hungary)	20	Péter Szappanos	5	1	6
2	(Slovakia)	83	Tomáš Tujvel	0	0	0
3	(Hungary)	98	Gellért Dúzs	0	0	0
			TOTALS	5	1	6
