= 2020–21 Budapest Honvéd FC season =

Budapest Honvéd FC
2020–21 season
- Chairman: George Hemingway
- Manager: Tamás Bódog (until 6 December 2020); István Pisont (until 15 February 2021); Ferenc Horváth
- NB 1: 10th
- Magyar Kupa: Round of 16
- UEFA Europa League: Second qualifying round
- Top goalscorer: League: Dániel Gazdag (13); All: Dániel Gazdag (18)
- Highest home attendance: 2,378 vs Fehérvár (18 October 2020)
- Lowest home attendance: 1,582 vs Mezőkövesd (31 October 2020)
Home colours	Away colours

The 2020–21 season was Budapest Honvéd FC's 110th competitive season, 16th consecutive season in the OTP Bank Liga and 111th year in existence as a football club.

== Transfers ==
=== Summer ===
In: Note: Flags indicate national team as defined under FIFA eligibility rules; some limited exceptions apply. Players may hold more than one non-FIFA nationality.

No.	Pos.	Nation	Player
1	GK	UKR	Oleksandr Nad (from Debrecen)
9	FW	ITA	Davide Lanzafame (from Ferencváros)
11	MF	HUN	Donát Zsótér (from Újpest)
22	DF	HUN	Krisztián Tamás (from Fehérvár)
29	FW	MLI	Boubacar Traoré (from (Tunisia) Bizertin)
31	MF	HUN	Barna Kesztyűs (from Paks)
34	FW	BRB	Thierry Gale (from Budapest Honvéd U-19)
36	DF	HUN	Botond Baráth (from (United States) Kansas City)
99	FW	HUN	Kristóf Tóth-Gábor (from Szombathelyi Haladás)
—	DF	ROU	Artur Crăciun (from (Romania) Universitatea Cluj)

Out: Note: Flags indicate national team as defined under FIFA eligibility rules; some limited exceptions apply. Players may hold more than one non-FIFA nationality.

No.	Pos.	Nation	Player
1	GK	ISR	Robi Levkovich (to (Israel) Hapoel Hadera)
9	FW	ITA	Davide Lanzafame (to (Turkey) Adana Demirspor)
11	FW	CRC	Mayron George (loan return to (Denmark) Midtjylland)
22	FW	HUN	Milán Májer (loan to Győr)
26	DF	CMR	Macdonald Ngwa Niba
33	MF	CRO	Tonći Kukoč
60	DF	HUN	Attila Temesvári (loan to Győr)
85	MF	HUN	Gergő Irimiás (loan to Ajka)
88	DF	NGR	George Ikenne (loan return to MTK Budapest)
92	FW	HUN	Péter Tóth (loan to Ajka)
98	FW	HUN	Bálint Tömösvári (loan to Siófok)
—	DF	HUN	Zsombor Juhász (loan to Gyirmót)
—	DF	HUN	Milán Horváth (loan to Siófok)
—	FW	HUN	Kristóf Herjeczki (to Gyirmót)

=== Winter ===
In: Note: Flags indicate national team as defined under FIFA eligibility rules; some limited exceptions apply. Players may hold more than one non-FIFA nationality.

No.	Pos.	Nation	Player
4	DF	POL	Lukas Klemenz (from (Poland) Wisła Kraków)
5	DF	ISR	Nir Bardea (from (Israel) Ashdod)
19	MF	HUN	Dominik Nagy (from (Poland) Legia Warsaw)
21	MF	HUN	Lukács Bőle (from Ferencváros)
92	MF	HUN	Péter Tóth (loan return from Ajka)
—	DF	HUN	Zsombor Juhász (loan return from Gyirmót)

Out: Note: Flags indicate national team as defined under FIFA eligibility rules; some limited exceptions apply. Players may hold more than one non-FIFA nationality.

No.	Pos.	Nation	Player
4	DF	HUN	Dávid Kálnoki-Kis (to Zalaegerszeg)
14	DF	MDA	Artur Crăciun (loan to (Romania) Sepsi)
19	FW	HUN	Roland Ugrai (to Debrecen)
20	FW	HUN	Dominik Cipf (loan to Siófok)
92	MF	HUN	Péter Tóth (loan to Békéscsaba)
99	FW	HUN	Kristóf Tóth-Gábor (loan to Kazincbarcika)
—	DF	HUN	Zsombor Juhász (loan to Monor)

=== Nemzeti Bajnokság I ===
==== League table ====
Pos	Team	Pld	W	D	L	GF	GA	GD	Pts	Qualification or relegation
8	Mezőkövesd	33	11	9	13	40	46	−6	42	
9	Zalaegerszeg	33	10	7	16	58	58	0	37	
10	Honvéd	33	9	10	14	46	48	−2	37	
11	Diósgyőr (R)	33	9	6	18	34	53	−19	33	Relegation to the Nemzeti Bajnokság II
12	Budafok (R)	33	7	6	20	34	74	−40	27	Relegation to the Nemzeti Bajnokság II

Source: Hungarian Football Federation (in Hungarian), Soccerway
Rules for classification: 1) Points; 2) Matches won; 3) Goal difference; 4) Goals scored; 5) Head-to-head points; 6) Head-to-head goal difference; 7) Head-to-head away goals scored; 8) Fair play ranking; 9) Drawing of lots.
(R) Relegated

==== Results summary ====
Overall								Home						Away					
Pld	W	D	L	GF	GA	GD	Pts	W	D	L	GF	GA	GD	W	D	L	GF	GA	GD
33	9	10	14	46	48	−2	37	2	7	8	27	30	−3	7	3	6	19	18	+1

Last updated: 15 May 2021.
Source: NB1

==== Results by round ====
Round	1	2	3	4	5	6	7	8	9	10	11	12	13	14	15	16	17	18	19	20	21	22	23	24	25	26	27	28	29	30	31	32	33
Ground	A	A	H	A	H	A	H	A	H	A	H	H	H	A	H	A	H	A	H	A	H	A	A	H	H	A	H	A	H	A	H	A	H
Result	L	L	L	W	L	W	D	D	D	W	L	L	D	D	W	L	D	W	D	L	L	L	W	W	L	D	D	W	L	L	D	W	L
Position	12	11	12	11	12	10	10	9	10	9	10	10	11	11	9	10	10	9	9	10	11	11	11	9	9	9	9	9	9	10	10	10	10

Updated to match(es) played on 15 May 2021. Source: Matches
A = Away; H = Home; W = Win; D = Draw; L = Loss

==== Matches ====
14 August 2020 1	Puskás Akadémia	1 – 0	Budapest Honvéd	Felcsút
15:30 CEST	Meißner 90'	Report		Stadium: Pancho Aréna; Attendance: 623; Referee: József Erdős

21 August 2020 2	MTK Budapest	3 – 1	Budapest Honvéd	Budapest
19:00 CEST	Gera 16'; Herrera 66'; Katona 77'	Report	Gazdag 26'	Stadium: Hidegkuti Nándor Stadion; Attendance: 3,199; Referee: Ádám Pillók

30 August 2020 3	Budapest Honvéd	1 – 2	Kisvárda	Budapest
20:00 CEST	Tsoukalas 19' (o.g.)	Report	Tsoukalas 5'; Viana 17'	Stadium: Hidegkuti Nándor Stadion; Attendance: 2,183; Referee: Ádám Farkas

12 September 2020 4	Diósgyőr	2 – 4	Budapest Honvéd	Miskolc
17:00 CEST	Grozav 42'; Molnár 47'	Report	Zsótér 16'; Gazdag 41', 63'; Ugrai 89'	Stadium: DVTK Stadion; Attendance: 3,917; Referee: Tamás Bognár

27 September 2020 5	Budapest Honvéd	1 – 2	Újpest	Budapest
18:00 CEST	Balogh 30'	Report	Antonov 77'; Simon 80'	Stadium: Hidegkuti Nándor Stadion; Attendance: 2,375; Referee: Péter Solymosi

4 October 2020 6	Zalaegerszeg	2 – 4	Budapest Honvéd	Zalaegerszeg
15:00 CEST	Könyves 72'; Koszta 90+4'	Report	Tamás 7'; Szendrei 29'; Balogh 48'; Traoré 86'	Stadium: ZTE Arena; Attendance: 2,716; Referee: Tamás Bognár

18 October 2020 7	Budapest Honvéd	2 – 2	Fehérvár	Budapest
17:00 CEST	Balogh 46'; Traoré 74'	Report	Négo 65'; Petryak 67'	Stadium: Hidegkuti Nándor Stadion; Attendance: 2,378; Referee: Ferenc Karakó

24 October 2020 8	Paks	0 – 0	Budapest Honvéd	Paks
17:00 CEST		Report		Stadium: Fehérvári úti Stadion; Attendance: 1,701; Referee: Ádám Farkas

31 October 2020 9	Budapest Honvéd	1 – 1	Mezőkövesd	Budapest
17:00 CET	Hidi 69'	Report	Berecz 62'	Stadium: Hidegkuti Nándor Stadion; Attendance: 1,582; Referee: Mihály Kárpály

23 December 2020 10	Budafok	1 – 2	Budapest Honvéd	Budapest
20:15 CET	Skribek 1'	Report	Gazdag 45' (pen.); Balogh 68'	Stadium: Promontor utcai Stadion; Attendance: no spectators Referee: Ferenc Karakó

21 November 2020 11	Budapest Honvéd	0 – 1	Ferencváros	Budapest
19:30 CET		Report	Heister 27'	Stadium: Hidegkuti Nándor Stadion; Attendance: no spectators Referee: Péter Solymosi

29 November 2020 12	Budapest Honvéd	0 – 1	Puskás Akadémia	Budapest
18:45 CET		Report	Vaněček 90+2'	Stadium: Hidegkuti Nándor Stadion; Attendance: no spectators Referee: Ádám Pillók

6 December 2020 13	Budapest Honvéd	2 – 2	MTK Budapest	Budapest
15:15 CET	Tamás 20'; Hidi 27'	Report	Miovski 51'; Cseke 85' (pen.)	Stadium: Hidegkuti Nándor Stadion; Attendance: no spectators Referee: Zoltán Iványi

12 December 2020 14	Kisvárda	0 – 0	Budapest Honvéd	Kisvárda
14:45 CET		Report		Stadium: Várkerti Stadion; Attendance: no spectators Referee: Péter Solymosi

16 December 2020 15	Budapest Honvéd	5 – 1	Diósgyőr	Budapest
18:00 CET	Gazdag 24', 71'; Zsótér 30'; Szendrei 63'; Lovrić 75'	Report	Grozav 50'	Stadium: Hidegkuti Nándor Stadion; Attendance: no spectators Referee: Csaba Pintér

20 December 2020 16	Újpest	2 – 1	Budapest Honvéd	Budapest
17:00 CET	Beridze 64'; Perošević 77'	Report	Balogh 67'	Stadium: Szusza Ferenc Stadion; Attendance: no spectators Referee: Péter Antal

24 January 2021 17	Budapest Honvéd	2 – 2	Zalaegerszeg	Budapest
18:00 CET	Hidi 27'; Gazdag 77' (pen.)	Report	Szépe 66'; Bedi 74'	Stadium: Hidegkuti Nándor Stadion; Attendance: no spectators Referee: Péter Solymosi

30 January 2021 18	Fehérvár	1 – 2	Budapest Honvéd	Székesfehérvár
19:30 CET	Dárdai 45'	Report	Hidi 22'; Batik 80'	Stadium: MOL Aréna Sóstó; Attendance: no spectators Referee: Gergő Bogár

3 February 2021 19	Budapest Honvéd	1 – 1	Paks	Budapest
17:30 CET	Balogh 56'	Report	Ádám 49'	Stadium: Hidegkuti Nándor Stadion; Attendance: no spectators Referee: Péter Antal

6 February 2021 20	Mezőkövesd	2 – 1	Budapest Honvéd	Mezőkövesd
17:00 CET	Vadnai 23'; Jurina 27'	Report	Gale 85'	Stadium: Mezőkövesdi Városi Stadion; Attendance: no spectators Referee: Mihály Káprály

13 February 2021 21	Budapest Honvéd	2 – 3	Budafok	Budapest
19:30 CET	Gazdag 37'; Bőle 40'	Report	Kovács 28'; Szendrei 51' (o.g.); Ihrig-Farkas 90+2'	Stadium: Hidegkuti Nándor Stadion; Attendance: no spectators Referee: Péter Solymosi

20 February 2021 22	Ferencváros	1 – 0	Budapest Honvéd	Budapest
19:30 CET	Uzuni 56'	Report		Stadium: Groupama Arena; Attendance: no spectators Referee: Ádám Farkas

27 February 2021 23	Puskás Akadémia	1 – 2	Budapest Honvéd	Felcsút
17:00 CET	Knežević 19'	Report	Gazdag 33', 73' (pen.)	Stadium: Pancho Aréna; Attendance: no spectators Referee: Balázs Berke

2 March 2021 24	Budapest Honvéd	3 – 2	MTK Budapest	Budapest
17:30 CET	Gazdag 34'; Balogh 71', 73'	Report	Varga 6'; Schön 18'	Stadium: Hidegkuti Nándor Stadion; Attendance: no spectators Referee: Ferenc Karakó

7 March 2021 25	Budapest Honvéd	0 – 1	Kisvárda	Budapest
16:00 CET		Report	Navrátil 90+2'	Stadium: Hidegkuti Nándor Stadion; Attendance: no spectators Referee: Sándor Andó-Szabó

13 March 2021 26	Diósgyőr	0 – 0	Budapest Honvéd	Miskolc
19:30 CET		Report		Stadium: DVTK Stadion; Attendance: no spectators Referee: Gergő Bogár

3 April 2021 27	Budapest Honvéd	2 – 2	Újpest	Budapest
19:30 CEST	Gazdag 37' (pen.), 38'	Report	Tallo 13'; Beridze 25'	Stadium: Hidegkuti Nándor Stadion; Attendance: no spectators Referee: Tamás Bognár

11 April 2021 28	Zalaegerszeg	0 – 1	Budapest Honvéd	Zalaegerszeg
17:00 CEST		Report	D. Nagy 57'	Stadium: ZTE Arena; Attendance: no spectators Referee: Ádám Farkas

18 April 2021 29	Budapest Honvéd	2 – 3	Fehérvár	Budapest
17:30 CEST	Balogh 25'; D. Nagy 41'	Report	Nikolić 22' (pen.); Houri 78' (pen.); Négo 90'	Stadium: Hidegkuti Nándor Stadion; Attendance: no spectators Referee: Zoltán Iványi

21 April 2021 30	Paks	2 – 0	Budapest Honvéd	Paks
20:15 CEST	Hahn 34'; Balogh 39'	Report		Stadium: Fehérvári úti Stadion; Attendance: no spectators Referee: Balázs Berke

25 April 2021 31	Budapest Honvéd	2 – 2	Mezőkövesd	Budapest
19:30 CEST	Batik 51'; Balogh 89'	Report	Cseri 16'; Jurina 83'	Stadium: Hidegkuti Nándor Stadion; Attendance: no spectators Referee: Csaba Pintér

2 May 2021 32	Budafok	0 – 1	Budapest Honvéd	Budapest
17:00 CEST		Report	Mezghrani 53'	Stadium: Promontor utcai Stadion; Attendance: 650; Referee: István Vad

8 May 2021 33	Budapest Honvéd	1 – 2	Ferencváros	Budapest
17:00 CEST	Eppel 44'	Report	Isael 83'; Boli 86'	Stadium: Hidegkuti Nándor Stadion; Attendance: 1,892; Referee: Tamás Bognár

=== UEFA Europa League ===
==== Qualifying round ====
27 August 2020 Q1	Budapest Honvéd	2–1 (a.e.t.)	(Finland) Inter Turku	Budapest
21:00 CEST	Traoré 90'; Hämäläinen 105' (o.g.)	Report	Liliu 90+1'	Stadium: Hidegkuti Nándor Stadion; Attendance: 0 Referee: (Israel) Gal Leibovitz

17 September 2020 Q2	Budapest Honvéd	0–2	(Sweden) Malmö	Budapest
21:05 CEST		Report	Toivonen 43'; Traustason 86'	Stadium: Hidegkuti Nándor Stadion; Attendance: 0 Referee: (Greece) Anastasios Papapetrou

=== Hungarian Cup ===
20 September 2020 Round 6	Tiszaújváros	1–7	Budapest Honvéd	Tiszaújváros
12:30 CEST	Kristófi 4' (pen.)	Report	Gazdag 31', 61', 78', 85'; Tóth-Gábor 47'; Nagy 87'; Aliji 90+3'	Stadium: Városi Sportcentrum; Attendance: 800; Referee: János Takács

28 October 2020 Round 7	Csácsbozsok	0–2	Budapest Honvéd	Nemesapáti
12:30 CET		Report	Tóth-Gábor 52'; Gale 82'	Stadium: Nemesapáti Sportpálya; Referee: Gergely Bana

10 February 2021 Round of 32	III. Kerület	1 – 3	Budapest Honvéd	Budapest
13:00 CET	Remili 22'	Report	Gale 14'; Bőle 38'; Traoré 40'	Stadium: III. Kerület Stadion; Referee: Norbert Nagy

24 February 2021 Round of 16	Zalaegerszeg	2 – 1 (a.e.t.)	Budapest Honvéd	Zalaegerszeg
14:00 CET	Futács 50' (pen.); Koszta 97'	Report	Gazdag 32' (pen.)	Stadium: ZTE Arena; Referee: Ádám Németh

== Statistics ==
=== Appearances and goals ===
Last updated on 15 May 2021.

No.	Pos	Nat	Player	Total		OTP Bank Liga		Hungarian Cup		Europa League	
No.	Pos	Nat	Player	Apps	Goals	Apps	Goals	Apps	Goals	Apps	Goals
1	GK	(Ukraine) UKR	Oleksandr Nad	2	-1	0	0	2	-1	0	0
2	DF	(Algeria) ALG	Mohamed Mezghrani	30	1	25	1	3	0	2	0
3	DF	(Nigeria) NGR	Eke Uzoma	10	0	8	0	1	0	1	0
4	DF	(Poland) POL	Lukas Klemenz	8	0	6	0	2	0	0	0
5	DF	(Israel) ISR	Nir Bardea	6	0	5	0	1	0	0	0
6	MF	(Hungary) HUN	Dániel Gazdag	34	18	30	13	2	5	2	0
7	DF	(Hungary) HUN	Bence Batik	30	2	25	2	3	0	2	0
8	MF	(Hungary) HUN	Patrik Hidi	33	4	30	4	1	0	2	0
9	FW	(Hungary) HUN	Márton Eppel	12	1	12	1	0	0	0	0
11	MF	(Hungary) HUN	Donát Zsótér	32	2	27	2	3	0	2	0
17	FW	(Hungary) HUN	Norbert Balogh	27	10	26	10	0	0	1	0
18	GK	(Hungary) HUN	András Horváth	0	0	0	0	0	0	0	0
19	MF	(Hungary) HUN	Dominik Nagy	17	2	16	2	1	0	0	0
21	MF	(Hungary) HUN	Lukács Bőle	12	2	11	1	1	1	0	0
22	DF	(Hungary) HUN	Krisztián Tamás	24	2	22	2	2	0	0	0
24	MF	(Bosnia and Herzegovina) BIH	Đorđe Kamber	25	0	20	0	4	0	1	0
25	DF	(Croatia) CRO	Ivan Lovrić	30	1	26	1	3	0	1	0
27	MF	(Hungary) HUN	Norbert Szendrei	30	2	26	2	3	0	1	0
29	FW	(Mali) MLI	Boubacar Traoré	22	4	18	2	2	1	2	1
30	DF	(Albania) ALB	Naser Aliji	17	1	12	0	3	1	2	0
31	DF	(Hungary) HUN	Barna Kesztyűs	20	0	15	0	3	0	2	0
34	FW	(Barbados) BRB	Thierry Gale	12	3	9	1	3	2	0	0
36	DF	(Hungary) HUN	Botond Baráth	16	0	14	0	0	0	2	0
37	MF	(Hungary) HUN	Bertalan Bocskay	16	0	14	0	1	0	1	0
77	MF	(Hungary) HUN	Gergő Nagy	15	1	11	0	4	1	0	0
82	FW	(Hungary) HUN	Dávid László	9	0	7	0	2	0	0	0
83	GK	(Slovakia) SVK	Tomáš Tujvel	37	-55	33	-49	2	-3	2	-3
84	FW	(Hungary) HUN	Zalán Kerezsi	1	0	1	0	0	0	0	0
91	DF	(Hungary) HUN	Alex Szabó	2	0	1	0	1	0	0	0
92	MF	(Hungary) HUN	Dominik Kocsis	11	0	9	0	2	0	0	0
93	MF	(Hungary) HUN	Noel Keresztes	1	0	1	0	0	0	0	0
94	FW	(Hungary) HUN	Dániel Németh	2	0	2	0	0	0	0	0
Youth players:
66	GK	(Hungary) HUN	Attila Berla	1	0	0	0	1	0	0	0
79	DF	(Hungary) HUN	István Pekár	0	0	0	0	0	0	0	0
81	DF	(Hungary) HUN	Viktor Csörgő	0	0	0	0	0	0	0	0
85	FW	(Hungary) HUN	András Eördögh	0	0	0	0	0	0	0	0
86	MF	(Hungary) HUN	Dominik Kovács	0	0	0	0	0	0	0	0
95	MF	(Hungary) HUN	Botond Bartha	0	0	0	0	0	0	0	0
96	FW	(Hungary) HUN	Dániel Lukács	1	0	0	0	1	0	0	0
97	DF	(Hungary) HUN	Barna Benczenleitner	0	0	0	0	0	0	0	0
98	GK	(Hungary) HUN	Gellért Dúzs	0	0	0	0	0	0	0	0
Out to loan:
14	DF	(Moldova) MDA	Artur Crăciun	3	0	2	0	1	0	0	0
20	FW	(Hungary) HUN	Dominik Cipf	3	0	2	0	1	0	0	0
99	FW	(Hungary) HUN	Kristóf Tóth-Gábor	9	2	6	0	2	2	1	0
Players no longer at the club:
19	FW	(Hungary) HUN	Roland Ugrai	11	1	8	1	1	0	2	0

=== Top scorers ===
Includes all competitive matches. The list is sorted by shirt number when total goals are equal.

Last updated on 15 May 2020

Position	Nation	Number	Name	OTP Bank Liga	UEFA Europa League	Hungarian Cup	Total
1	(Hungary)	6	Dániel Gazdag	13	0	5	18
2	(Hungary)	17	Norbert Balogh	10	0	0	10
3	(Hungary)	8	Patrik Hidi	4	0	0	4
4	(Mali)	29	Boubacar Traoré	2	1	1	4
5	(Barbados)	34	Thierry Gale	1	0	2	3
6	(Hungary)	11	Donát Zsótér	2	0	0	2
7	(Hungary)	22	Krisztián Tamás	2	0	0	2
8	(Hungary)	27	Norbert Szendrei	2	0	0	2
9	(Hungary)	19	Dominik Nagy	2	0	0	2
10	(Hungary)	7	Bence Batik	2	0	0	2
11	(Hungary)	21	Lukács Bőle	1	0	1	2
12	(Hungary)	99	Kristóf Tóth-Gábor	0	0	2	2
13	(Hungary)	19	Roland Ugrai	1	0	0	1
14	(Croatia)	25	Ivan Lovrić	1	0	0	1
15	(Algeria)	2	Mohamed Mezghrani	1	0	0	1
16	(Hungary)	9	Márton Eppel	1	0	0	1
17	(Hungary)	77	Gergő Nagy	0	0	1	1
18	(Albania)	30	Naser Aliji	0	0	1	1
			Own goals	1	1	0	2
			TOTALS	46	2	13	61

=== Disciplinary record ===
Includes all competitive matches. Players with 1 card or more included only.

Last updated on 15 May 2021

Position	Nation	Number	Name	OTP Bank Liga		UEFA Europa League		Hungarian Cup		Total (Hu Total)	
Position	Nation	Number	Name	Yellow card	Red card	Yellow card	Red card	Yellow card	Red card	Yellow card	Red card
DF	(Algeria)	2	Mohamed Mezghrani	8	0	1	0	1	0	10 (8)	0 (0)
DF	(Nigeria)	3	Eke Uzoma	1	0	1	0	0	0	2 (1)	0 (0)
DF	(Poland)	4	Lukas Klemenz	2	0	0	0	0	1	2 (2)	1 (0)
DF	(Israel)	5	Nir Bardea	1	0	0	0	0	0	1 (1)	0 (0)
MF	(Hungary)	6	Dániel Gazdag	4	0	1	0	0	0	5 (4)	0 (0)
DF	(Hungary)	7	Bence Batik	6	0	0	0	1	0	7 (6)	0 (0)
MF	(Hungary)	8	Patrik Hidi	6	0	0	0	0	0	6 (6)	0 (0)
FW	(Hungary)	9	Márton Eppel	1	0	0	0	0	0	1 (1)	0 (0)
MF	(Hungary)	11	Donát Zsótér	8	1	0	0	0	0	8 (8)	1 (1)
FW	(Hungary)	17	Norbert Balogh	4	0	0	0	0	0	4 (4)	0 (0)
FW	(Hungary)	19	Roland Ugrai	3	0	1	0	0	0	4 (3)	0 (0)
MF	(Hungary)	19	Dominik Nagy	2	0	0	0	0	0	2 (2)	0 (0)
MF	(Hungary)	21	Lukács Bőle	5	0	0	0	0	0	5 (5)	0 (0)
DF	(Hungary)	22	Krisztián Tamás	3	1	0	0	0	0	3 (3)	1 (1)
MF	(Bosnia and Herzegovina)	24	Đorđe Kamber	6	0	1	0	0	0	7 (6)	0 (0)
DF	(Croatia)	25	Ivan Lovrić	9	0	0	0	0	0	9 (9)	0 (0)
MF	(Hungary)	27	Norbert Szendrei	5	0	0	0	0	0	5 (5)	0 (0)
FW	(Mali)	29	Boubacar Traoré	2	0	1	0	0	0	3 (2)	0 (0)
DF	(Albania)	30	Naser Aliji	3	0	0	0	0	0	3 (3)	0 (0)
DF	(Hungary)	31	Barna Kesztyűs	0	0	0	0	1	0	1 (0)	0 (0)
FW	(Barbados)	34	Thierry Gale	1	0	0	0	0	0	1 (1)	0 (0)
DF	(Hungary)	36	Botond Baráth	5	0	1	0	0	0	6 (5)	0 (0)
MF	(Hungary)	37	Bertalan Bocskay	3	0	0	0	0	0	3 (3)	0 (0)
MF	(Hungary)	77	Gergő Nagy	1	0	0	0	0	0	1 (1)	0 (0)
GK	(Slovakia)	83	Tomáš Tujvel	4	0	0	0	0	1	4 (4)	1 (0)
FW	(Hungary)	84	Zalán Kerezsi	1	0	0	0	0	0	1 (1)	0 (0)
MF	(Hungary)	92	Dominik Kocsis	1	0	0	0	0	0	1 (1)	0 (0)
FW	(Hungary)	96	Dániel Lukács	0	0	0	0	1	0	1 (0)	0 (0)
FW	(Hungary)	99	Kristóf Tóth-Gábor	1	0	0	0	0	0	1 (1)	0 (0)
			TOTALS	96	2	7	0	4	2	107 (96)	4 (2)

=== Overall ===
Games played	39 (33 OTP Bank Liga, 2 UEFA Europa League and 4 Hungarian Cup)
Games won	13 (9 OTP Bank Liga, 1 UEFA Europa League and 3 Hungarian Cup)
Games drawn	10 (10 OTP Bank Liga, 0 UEFA Europa League and 0 Hungarian Cup)
Games lost	16 (14 OTP Bank Liga, 1 UEFA Europa League and 1 Hungarian Cup)
Goals scored	61
Goals conceded	55
Goal difference	+6
Yellow cards	107
Red cards	4
Worst discipline	(Algeria) Mohamed Mezghrani (10 (yellow card) , 0 (red card) )
Worst discipline	(Hungary) Donát Zsótér (8 (yellow card) , 1 (red card) )
Best result	7–1 (A) v Tiszaújváros - Hungarian Cup - 20-9-2020
Worst result	1–3 (A) v MTK Budapest - Nemzeti Bajnokság I - 21-8-2020
Worst result	0–2 (H) v Malmö - UEFA Europa League - 17-9-2020
Most appearances	(Slovakia) Tomáš Tujvel (37 appearances)
Top scorer	(Hungary) Dániel Gazdag (18 goals)
Points	46/117 (39.31%)

Last updated: 15 May 2021
