= 2014–15 Paksi FC season =

Paks
2014–15 season
- Chairman: János Süli
- Manager: Aurél Csertői
Home colours	Away colours

The 2014–15 season was Paksi Football Club's 9th competitive season, 9th consecutive season in the Nemzeti Bajnokság I and 62nd year in existence as a football club. In addition to the domestic league, Paks participated in this season's editions of the Hungarian Cup and Hungarian League Cup.

== First team squad ==
Note: Flags indicate national team as defined under FIFA eligibility rules; some limited exceptions apply. Players may hold more than one non-FIFA nationality.

No.	Pos.	Nation	Player
1	GK	SVK	Péter Molnár
5	DF	HUN	Zsolt Gévay
6	DF	HUN	Gábor Kovács
7	DF	HUN	Tamás Báló
8	MF	HUN	Tamás Kecskés
9	MF	HUN	János Hahn
10	MF	HUN	Tamás Kiss
12	FW	HUN	Richárd Nagy
14	FW	HUN	Dávid Bor
16	DF	HUN	Tibor Heffler
18	DF	HUN	Attila Fiola

No.	Pos.	Nation	Player
19	MF	HUN	Barna Kesztyűs
21	MF	HUN	Zsolt Tamási
22	DF	HUN	András Vági
25	FW	HUN	Márton Eppel
26	MF	HUN	Lajos Bertus
39	FW	HUN	László Bartha
42	FW	HUN	Norbert Könyves
46	FW	HUN	András Simon
77	MF	HUN	Dávid Kulcsár
88	MF	HUN	Zsolt Haraszti

== Transfers ==
=== Summer ===
In: Note: Flags indicate national team as defined under FIFA eligibility rules; some limited exceptions apply. Players may hold more than one non-FIFA nationality.

No.	Pos.	Nation	Player
—	MF	HUN	Lajos Bertus (from Puskás)
—	MF	HUN	János Hahn (from Puskás)
—	DF	HUN	Zsolt Gévay (from Mezőkövesd)
—	MF	HUN	Zsolt Tamási (from (Italy) Parma)
—	FW	HUN	Barnabás Vári (loan return from Szolnok)
—	MF	HUN	Roland Bohner (loan return from Szolnok)
—	FW	HUN	István Nagy (loan return from Szolnok)
—	DF	HUN	József Zsók (loan return from Baja)
—	FW	HUN	Márton Eppel (loan return from MTK Budapest)
—	MF	HUN	Norbert Heffler (loan return from Sopron)
—	FW	HUN	Dániel Tóth (loan return from Kozármisleny)

Out: Note: Flags indicate national team as defined under FIFA eligibility rules; some limited exceptions apply. Players may hold more than one non-FIFA nationality.

No.	Pos.	Nation	Player
9	FW	HUN	Attila Simon (to (Austria) Wolfsberger AC)
21	MF	HUN	Gábor Bori (to Diósgyőr)
22	MF	HUN	József Windecker (loan return to Győr)
23	MF	HUN	Olivér Nagy (to Haladás)
27	MF	HUN	Norbert Heffler (to Pécs)
63	DF	HUN	László Éger (retired)
—	FW	HUN	Dániel Tóth (loan to Szolnok)
—	MF	HUN	Roland Bohner (loan to Szolnok)
—	FW	HUN	István Nagy (loan to Szolnok)
—	FW	HUN	Barnabás Vári (loan to Szolnok)

- List of Hungarian football transfers summer 2014

== Statistics ==
=== Appearances and goals ===
Last updated on 30 November 2014.

No.	Pos	Nat	Player	Total		OTP Bank Liga		Hungarian Cup		League Cup	
No.	Pos	Nat	Player	Apps	Goals	Apps	Goals	Apps	Goals	Apps	Goals
1	GK	(Slovakia) SVK	Péter Molnár	16	-13	16	-13	0	0	0	0
5	DF	(Hungary) HUN	Zsolt Gévay	18	2	16	1	0	0	2	1
6	DF	(Hungary) HUN	Gábor Kovács	19	1	16	1	1	0	2	0
7	DF	(Hungary) HUN	Tamás Báló	17	2	16	2	0	0	1	0
8	MF	(Hungary) HUN	Tamás Kecskés	17	3	14	1	1	0	2	2
9	MF	(Hungary) HUN	János Hahn	16	0	10	0	1	0	5	0
10	MF	(Hungary) HUN	Tamás Kiss	14	1	7	0	1	0	6	1
12	FW	(Hungary) HUN	Richárd Nagy	9	2	3	0	1	1	5	1
14	FW	(Hungary) HUN	Dávid Bor	8	5	1	1	1	0	6	4
16	DF	(Hungary) HUN	Tibor Heffler	5	2	5	2	0	0	0	0
18	DF	(Hungary) HUN	Attila Fiola	15	1	13	1	0	0	2	0
19	MF	(Hungary) HUN	Barna Kesztyűs	11	1	5	0	1	0	5	1
21	MF	(Hungary) HUN	Zsolt Tamási	18	0	15	0	1	0	2	0
22	DF	(Hungary) HUN	András Vági	10	0	4	0	0	0	6	0
25	FW	(Hungary) HUN	Márton Eppel	7	2	5	2	0	0	2	0
26	MF	(Hungary) HUN	Lajos Bertus	19	0	16	0	0	0	3	0
39	FW	(Hungary) HUN	László Bartha	19	7	15	6	1	0	3	1
42	FW	(Hungary) HUN	Norbert Könyves	12	5	11	5	0	0	1	0
46	MF	(Hungary) HUN	András Simon	15	2	10	1	0	0	5	1
77	MF	(Hungary) HUN	Dávid Kulcsár	19	0	12	0	1	0	6	0
88	MF	(Hungary) HUN	Zsolt Haraszti	13	3	10	2	0	0	3	1
Youth players:
2	DF	(Hungary) HUN	Patrik Bagó	7	0	0	0	1	0	6	0
7	MF	(Hungary) HUN	Máté Kesztyűs	1	0	0	0	0	0	1	0
15	DF	(Hungary) HUN	Máté Steinbach	2	0	0	0	0	0	2	0
18	MF	(Hungary) HUN	Zsolt Rácz	3	0	0	0	0	0	3	0
20	FW	(Hungary) HUN	János Lázok	1	0	0	0	1	0	0	0
23	MF	(Hungary) HUN	Tamás Szekszárdi	5	0	0	0	1	0	4	0
23	DF	(Hungary) HUN	Ádám Csigi	2	0	0	0	0	0	2	0
24	GK	(Hungary) HUN	Norbert Csernyánszki	1	-2	0	0	1	-2	0	0
34	GK	(Hungary) HUN	Norbert Szemerédi	3	-6	0	0	0	0	3	-6
46	MF	(Hungary) HUN	Márk Simon	1	0	0	0	0	0	1	0
54	GK	(Hungary) HUN	Roland Máté	3	-4	0	0	0	0	3	-4
Players no longer at the club:

=== Top scorers ===
Includes all competitive matches. The list is sorted by shirt number when total goals are equal.

Last updated on 30 November 2014

Position	Nation	Number	Name	OTP Bank Liga	Hungarian Cup	League Cup	Total
1	(Hungary)	39	László Bartha	6	0	1	7
2	(Hungary)	42	Norbert Könyves	5	0	0	5
3	(Hungary)	14	Dávid Bor	1	0	4	5
4	(Hungary)	88	Zsolt Haraszti	2	0	1	3
5	(Hungary)	8	Tamás Kecskés	1	0	2	3
6	(Hungary)	16	Tibor Heffler	2	0	0	2
7	(Hungary)	25	Márton Eppel	2	0	0	2
8	(Hungary)	7	Tamás Báló	2	0	0	2
9	(Hungary)	5	Zsolt Gévay	1	0	1	2
10	(Hungary)	46	András Simon	1	0	1	2
11	(Hungary)	12	Richárd Nagy	0	1	1	2
12	(Hungary)	18	Attila Fiola	1	0	0	1
13	(Hungary)	6	Gábor Kovács	1	0	0	1
14	(Hungary)	19	Barna Kesztyűs	0	0	1	1
15	(Hungary)	10	Tamás Kiss	0	0	1	1
/	/	/	Own Goals	0	0	0	0
			TOTALS	24	1	13	38

=== Disciplinary record ===
Includes all competitive matches. Players with 1 card or more included only.

Last updated on 30 November 2014

Position	Nation	Number	Name	OTP Bank Liga		Hungarian Cup		League Cup		Total (Hu Total)	
Position	Nation	Number	Name	Booked	Sent off (straight red)	Booked	Sent off (straight red)	Booked	Sent off (straight red)	Booked	Sent off (straight red)
DF	(Hungary)	2	Patrik Bagó	0	0	1	0	0	0	1 (0)	0 (0)
DF	(Hungary)	5	Zsolt Gévay	1	0	0	0	0	0	1 (1)	0 (0)
DF	(Hungary)	6	Gábor Kovács	5	0	0	0	0	1	5 (5)	1 (0)
DF	(Hungary)	7	Tamás Báló	3	0	0	0	0	0	3 (3)	0 (0)
MF	(Hungary)	8	Tamás Kecskés	7	0	0	0	1	0	8 (7)	0 (0)
MF	(Hungary)	10	Tamás Kiss	1	0	0	0	0	0	1 (1)	0 (0)
FW	(Hungary)	12	Richárd Nagy	2	0	0	0	1	0	3 (2)	0 (0)
MF	(Hungary)	16	Tibor Heffler	1	0	0	0	0	0	1 (1)	0 (0)
DF	(Hungary)	18	Attila Fiola	5	0	0	0	1	0	6 (5)	0 (0)
MF	(Hungary)	21	Zsolt Tamási	5	0	0	0	0	0	5 (5)	0 (0)
DF	(Hungary)	22	András Vági	2	0	0	0	1	0	3 (2)	0 (0)
FW	(Hungary)	25	Márton Eppel	0	1	0	0	0	0	0 (0)	1 (1)
MF	(Hungary)	39	László Bartha	1	0	0	0	0	0	1 (1)	0 (0)
MF	(Hungary)	46	Márk Simon	0	0	0	0	1	0	1 (0)	0 (0)
MF	(Hungary)	77	Dávid Kulcsár	2	0	0	0	1	0	3 (2)	0 (0)
MF	(Hungary)	88	Zsolt Haraszti	2	0	0	0	0	0	2 (2)	0 (0)
			TOTALS	37	1	1	0	6	1	44 (37)	2 (1)

=== Overall ===
Games played	23 (16 OTP Bank Liga, 1 Hungarian Cup and 6 Hungarian League Cup)
Games won	9 (7 OTP Bank Liga, 0 Hungarian Cup and 2 Hungarian League Cup)
Games drawn	9 (6 OTP Bank Liga, 0 Hungarian Cup and 3 Hungarian League Cup)
Games lost	5 (3 OTP Bank Liga, 1 Hungarian Cup and 1 Hungarian League Cup)
Goals scored	39
Goals conceded	25
Goal difference	+14
Yellow cards	44
Red cards	2
Worst discipline	(Hungary) Tamás Kecskés (8 (yellow card) , 0 (red card) )
Best result	3–0 (A) v Nyíregyháza - OTP Bank Liga - 02-08-2014
Best result	3–0 (H) v MTK - OTP Bank Liga - 19-08-2014
Best result	3–0 (H) v Pápa - OTP Bank Liga - 08-11-2014
Worst result	0–2 (A) v Videoton - OTP Bank Liga - 25-10-2014
Most appearances	(Hungary) László Bartha (19 appearances)
Top scorer	(Hungary) László Bartha (7 goals)
Points	36/69 (52.17%)

Last updated: 30 November 2014

== Nemzeti Bajnokság I ==
=== Matches ===
27 July 2014 1	Paks	2 – 0	Győr	Paks, Tolna County
20:30 CEST	Kecskés 19'; Heffler 25'	(Report)		Stadium: Stadion PSE; Attendance: 1,147; Referee: (Hungary) József Erdős

2 August 2014 2	Nyíregyháza	0 – 3	Paks	Nyíregyháza, Szabolcs-Szatmár-Bereg County
18:30 CEST		Report	Eppel 17'; Heffler 41' (pen.); Könyves 75'	Stadium: Városi Stadion; Attendance: 2,245; Referee: (Hungary) Zsolt Szabó

8 August 2014 3	Paks	3 – 0	MTK	Paks, Tolna County
19:00 CEST	Bartha 3'; Eppel 58'; Könyves 84'	Report		Stadium: Stadion PSE; Attendance: 1,543; Referee: (Hungary) Péter Solymosi

15 August 2014 4	Puskás	1 – 1	Paks	Felcsút, Fejér County
19:00 CEST	Tóth 7'	Report	Könyves 79'	Stadium: Pancho Arena; Attendance: 1,292; Referee: (Hungary) József Erdős

23 August 2014 5	Paks	0 – 0	Újpest	Paks, Tolna County
16:30 CEST		Report		Stadium: Stadion PSE; Attendance: 2,658; Referee: (Hungary) Ádám Németh

29 August 2014 6	Haladás	1 – 3	Paks	Szombathely, Vas County
19:00 CEST	Gaál 42'	Report	Fiola 30'; Könyves 51', 77'	Stadium: Rohonci Street Stadium; Attendance: 2,250; Referee: (Hungary) Péter Solymosi

22 October 2014 7	Paks	3 – 1	Diósgyőr	Paks, Tolna County
18:00 CEST	Gévay 85'; Bartha 88', 90+2'	Report	Bacsa 56'	Stadium: Stadion PSE; Attendance: 810; Referee: (Hungary) Csaba Pintér

19 September 2014 8	Pécs	1 – 1	Paks	Pécs, Baranya County
19:00 CEST	Kovács 90+2' (o.g.)	Report	Bartha 86'	Stadium: Stadion PMFC; Attendance: 822; Referee: (Hungary) Péter Solymosi

27 September 2014 9	Paks	2 – 1	Debrecen	Paks, Tolna County
18:30 CEST	Bartha 37'; Báló 90+2'	Report	Kulcsár 16'	Stadium: Stadion PSE; Attendance: 1,125; Referee: (Hungary) Ádám Farkas

4 October 2014 10	Paks	2 – 3	Kecskemét	Paks, Tolna County
18:00 CEST	Kovács 7'; Haraszti 90+3'	Report	Bebeto 5'; Botka 61'; Balázs 71'	Stadium: Stadion PSE; Attendance: 1,483; Referee: (Hungary) Zsolt Szabó

18 October 2014 11	Honvéd	0 – 0	Paks	Budapest, Pest County
18:00 CEST		Report		Stadium: Bozsik Stadion; Attendance: 600; Referee: (Hungary) Mihály Fábián

25 October 2014 12	Videoton	2 – 0	Paks	Székesfehérvár, Fejér County
20:00 CEST	Oliveira 56'; Nikolić 90+4'	Report		Stadium: Sóstói Stadion; Attendance: 1,883; Referee: (Hungary) Viktor Kassai

1 November 2014 13	Ferencváros	0 – 0	Paks	Budapest, Pest County
20:00 CET		Report		Stadium: Groupama Arena; Attendance: 6,241; Referee: (Hungary) Ádám Farkas

8 November 2014 14	Paks	3 – 0	Pápa	Paks, Tolna County
16:00 CET	Báló 45'; Haraszti 68'; Bor 90+1'	Report		Stadium: Stadion PSE; Attendance: 1,053; Referee: (Hungary) Ádám Németh

22 November 2014 15	Dunaújváros	1 – 0	Paks	Dunaújváros, Fejér County
16:00 CET	Nikházi 61'	Report		Stadium: Dunaferr Arena; Attendance: 1,511; Referee: (Hungary) Sándor Andó-Szabó

30 November 2014 16	Győr	2 – 2	Paks	Győr, Győr-Moson-Sopron County
18:30 CET	Kvilitaia 63'; Lipták 75'	Report	Simon 72'; Bartha 90+1'	Stadium: ETO Park; Attendance: 1,227; Referee: (Hungary) Viktor Kassai

=== Classification ===
Pos	Team	Pld	W	D	L	GF	GA	GD	Pts	Qualification or relegation
3	MTK	30	18	3	9	39	25	+14	57	Qualification for Europa League first qualifying round
4	Debrecen	30	15	9	6	44	19	+25	54	Qualification for Europa League first qualifying round
5	Paks	30	14	9	7	44	27	+17	51	
6	Újpest	30	14	9	7	40	28	+12	51	
7	Diósgyőr	30	13	9	8	43	36	+7	48	

Source: mlsz.hu (in Hungarian)
Rules for classification: 1st points; 2nd overall wins; 3rd goal difference; 4th head-to-head points; 5th head-to-head goal difference; 6th head-to-head away goals scored; 7th fair-play points; 8th drawing of lots

=== Results summary ===
Overall								Home						Away					
Pld	W	D	L	GF	GA	GD	Pts	W	D	L	GF	GA	GD	W	D	L	GF	GA	GD
16	7	6	3	25	13	+12	27	5	1	1	15	5	+10	2	5	2	10	8	+2

Last updated: 30 November 2014.
Source: NB1

=== Results by round ===
Round	1	2	3	4	5	6	7	8	9	10	11	12	13	14	15	16	17	18	19	20	21	22	23	24	25	26	27	28	29	30
Ground	H	A	H	A	H	A	H	A	H	H	A	A	A	H	A	A														
Result	W	W	W	D	D	W	W	D	W	L	D	L	D	W	L	D														
Position	5	2	1	2	4	2	2	3	3	3	3	3	4	3	4	7														

Updated to match(es) played on 30 November 2014. Source: Matches
A = Away; H = Home; W = Win; D = Draw; L = Loss

== Hungarian Cup ==
12 August 2014 Round 1	Felsőtárkány	2 – 1	Paks	Felsőtárkány, Heves County
17:00 CEST	Boros 26'; Kasza 55'	Report	Nagy 15'	Stadium: Városi Sporttelep; Referee: (Hungary) Róbert Nagy

== League Cup ==
3 September 2014 1	Paks	1 – 1	Ferencváros	Paks, Tolna County
18:00 CEST	Haraszti 85'	Report	Zsivoczky 15'	Stadium: Stadion PSE; Attendance: 750; Referee: (Hungary) Gábor Oláh

16 September 2014 2	Kaposvár	1 – 4	Paks	Kaposvár, Somogy County
18:00 CEST	Kovács 85'	Report	Gévay 7'; Bor 45'; Kesztyűs 56'; Bartha 80'	Stadium: Stadion Kaposvár Rákóczi; Attendance: 200; Referee: (Hungary) Péter Zierkelbach

7 October 2014 3	Paks	2 – 2	Zalaegerszeg	Paks, Tolna County
14:30 CEST	Bor 47'; Nagy 58'	Report	Bailo 78'; Bíró 84'	Stadium: Stadion PSE; Attendance: 150; Referee: (Hungary) Gergely Szőts

15 October 2014 4	Zalaegerszeg	1 – 1	Paks	Zalaegerszeg, Zala County
16:00 CEST	Simonfalvi 69'	Report	Kecskés 21'	Stadium: ZTE Arena; Attendance: 150; Referee: (Hungary) Balázs Böcskei

11 November 2014 5	Paks	4 – 3	Kaposvár	Paks, Tolna County
13:30 CET	Bor 48', 69'; Kecskés 84'; Kiss 88' (pen.)	Report	Fejős 7'; Rajczi 9'; Király 39'	Stadium: Stadion PSE; Attendance: 100; Referee: (Hungary) Attila Molnár

25 November 2014 6	Ferencváros	2 – 1	Paks	Budapest, Pest County
16:00 CET	Busai 28'; Nagy 36'	Report	Simon 51'	Stadium: Groupama Arena; Attendance: 150; Referee: (Hungary) Ádám Radványi

Pos	Team	Pld	W	D	L	GF	GA	GD	Pts	Qualification	FER	PAK	KAP	ZAL
1	Ferencváros	6	3	2	1	9	4	+5	11	Advance to knockout phase	—	2–1	3–0	2–0
2	Paks	6	2	3	1	13	10	+3	9	Advance to knockout phase	1–1	—	4–3	2–2
3	Kaposvár	6	2	0	4	6	12	−6	6		1–0	1–4	—	1–0
4	Zalaegerszeg	6	1	3	2	5	7	−2	6		1–1	1–1	1–0	—

Source: Soccerway

=== Knockout phase ===
2 December 2014 Round of 16	Paks	0 – 3	MTK	Paks, Tolna County
13:00 CET		Report	Hajdú 6', 18'; Hrepka 28'	Stadium: Stadion PSE; Attendance: 50; Referee: (Hungary) Péter Solympsi

9 December 2014 Round of 16	MTK	2 – 1 (5 – 1 agg.)	Paks	Budapest, Pest County
12:00 CET	Vogyicska 57'; Hrepka 75'	Report	Bartha 40'	Stadium: Ikarus Sporttelep; Attendance: 50; Referee: (Hungary) Tamás Nazsa
