= Zinédine Machach =

French footballer (born 1996)

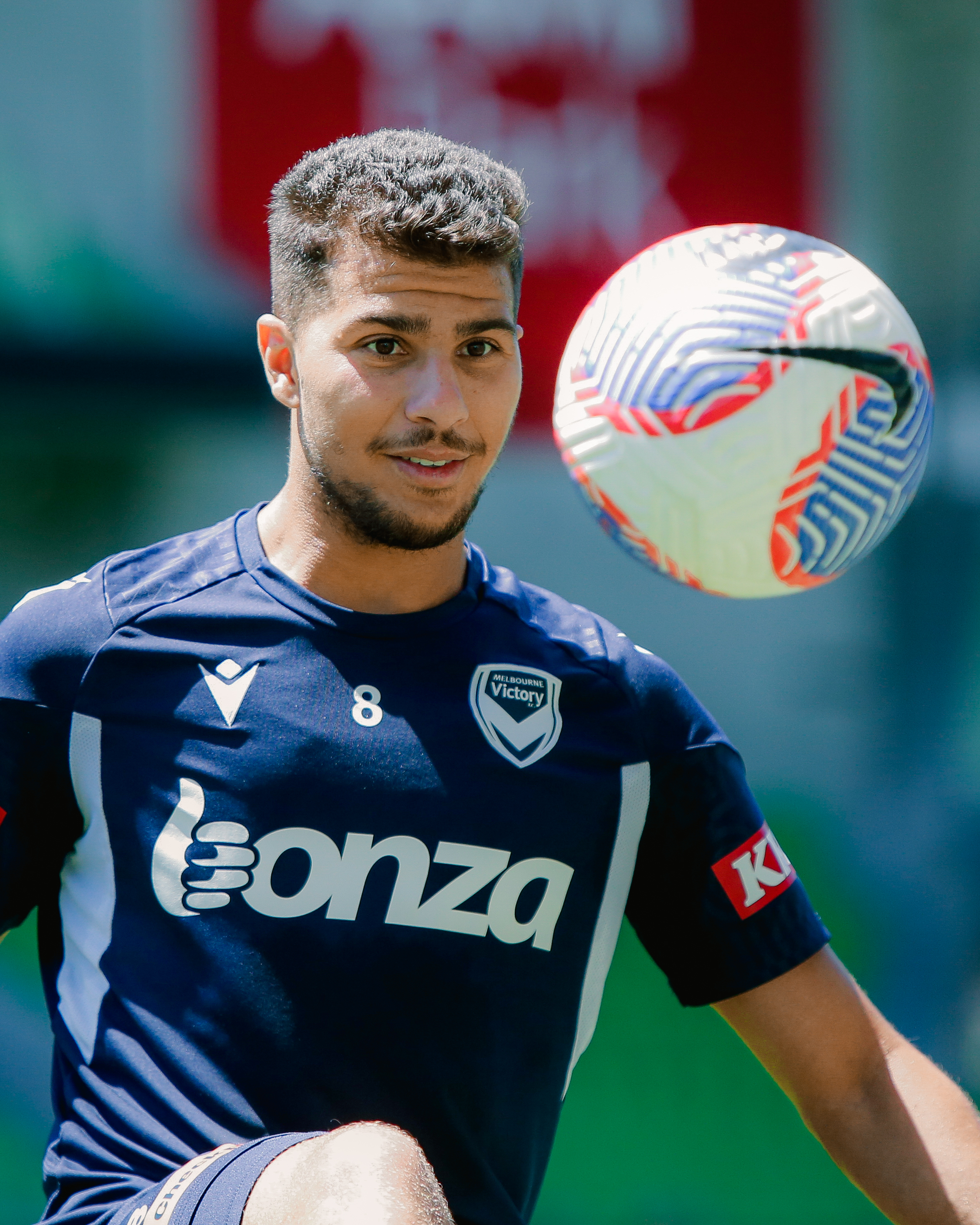
- Zinedine Machach training for Melbourne Victory, December 2023

Personal information
- Date of birth: 5 January 1996 (age 30)
- Place of birth: Marseille, France
- Height: 1.85 m (6 ft 1 in)
- Position: Midfielder

Team information
- Current team: RS Berkane
- Number: 29

Youth career
- 2002–2010: SC Air Bel
- 2010–2012: Cannes
- 2012–2014: Marseille
- 2014–2015: Toulouse

Senior career*
Years	Team	Apps	(Gls)
2014–2017	Toulouse B	25	(0)
2015–2017	Toulouse	21	(2)
2016–2017	→ Marseille (loan)	10	(0)
2018–2022	Napoli	0	(0)
2018–2019	→ Carpi (loan)	10	(0)
2019	→ Crotone (loan)	15	(0)
2019–2020	→ Cosenza (loan)	18	(1)
2020–2021	→ VVV-Venlo (loan)	24	(0)
2021–2022	→ Honvéd (loan)	21	(3)
2022–2023	Ionikos	23	(2)
2023–2025	Melbourne Victory	58	(14)
2025–	RS Berkane	2	(0)
- * Club domestic league appearances and goals as of 16 September 2025

Zinédine Machach (born 5 January 1996) is a French professional footballer who plays as a midfielder for Moroccan Botola Pro club RS Berkane.

== Career ==
Machach began his youth career with SC Air Bel, before moving to first AS Cannes and since Olympique Marseille. He then joined Toulouse in 2014. He made his Ligue 1 debut on 23 May 2015 against OGC Nice. He replaced Aleksandar Pešić after 58 minutes.

On 27 July 2016, Machach joined Olympique Marseille on a season-long loan deal with an option to buy.

On 21 July 2018, Machach joined to Serie B side Carpi on loan until 30 June 2019.

On 23 January 2019, Machach joined to Crotone on loan until 30 June 2019.

On 2 September 2019, he joined Cosenza on loan.

On 2 July 2022, Machach signed a two-year deal with Ionikos in Greece.

In August 2023, Machach signed a one-year contract with Melbourne Victory FC in Australia. He would have his debut for Melbourne Victory on the 21 October 2023 he would score in the 86th minute to make the game 2–0. he would prove to be a crucial player for Melbourne Victory throughout the 2023–24 season scoring seven goals in 29 games. Machach extended his contract with Melbourne Victory for another two seasons.

== Personal life ==
Machach was born in Marseille, France, and was born to an Algerian mother and a Moroccan father. He holds French and Algerian nationalities.

== Career statistics ==
As of 18 July 2024

Appearances and goals by club, season and competition
Club	Season	League			National Cup		League Cup		Other		Total	
Club	Season	Division	Apps	Goals	Apps	Goals	Apps	Goals	Apps	Goals	Apps	Goals
Toulouse	2014–15	Ligue 1	1	0	0	0	0	0	—		1	0
Toulouse	2015–16	Ligue 1	16	1	1	0	4	0	—		21	1
Toulouse	2017–18	Ligue 1	4	1	0	0	—		—		4	1
Toulouse	Total		21	2	1	0	4	0	0	0	26	2
Marseille (loan)	2016–17	Ligue 1	10	0	1	0	1	1	—		12	1
Marseille B (loan)	2016–17	Championnat de France Amateur	8	0	—		—		—		8	0
Napoli	2017–18	Serie A	0	0	0	0	—		—		0	0
Carpi (loan)	2018–19	Serie B	10	0	1	0	—		—		11	0
Crotone (loan)	2018–19	Serie B	15	0	0	0	—		—		15	0
Cosenza (loan)	2019–20	Serie B	18	1	0	0	—		—		18	1
VVV-Venlo (loan)	2020–21	Eredivisie	24	0	5	0	—		—		29	0
Honvéd (loan)	2021–22	Nemzeti Bajnokság I	21	3	3	0	—		—		24	3
Ionikos	2022–23	Super League Greece	23	2	1	0	—		—		24	2
Melbourne Victory	2023–24	A-League Men	29	7	0	0	—		—		29	7
Career totals			179	15	12	0	5	1	0	0	196	16
