= Mohamed Mezghrani =

Belgian footballer of Algerian descent (born 1994)

Personal information
- Full name: Amin Mohamed Mezghrani
- Date of birth: 2 June 1994 (age 32)
- Place of birth: Uccle, Belgium
- Height: 1.74 m (5 ft 8 1/2 in)
- Position: Full-back

Team information
- Current team: Radnički 1923
- Number: 2

Youth career
- Diegem Sport
- Brussels
- Standard Liège

Senior career*
Years	Team	Apps	(Gls)
2013–2015	Turnhout	41	(1)
2015–2016	Duffel		
2016–2018	Waalwijk	47	(1)
2018–2019	USM Alger	2	(0)
2019–2022	Budapest Honvéd	54	(1)
2022–2024	Puskás Akadémia	23	(0)
2024	Warta Poznań	12	(0)
2024–2026	Ruch Chorzów	41	(4)
2026–	Radnički 1923	0	(0)
- * Club domestic league appearances and goals as of 14 August 2026

Mohamed Mezghrani (born 2 June 1994) is a Belgian professional footballer who plays as a full-back for Serbian SuperLiga club Radnički 1923.

== Club career ==
On 2 June 2018, Mezghrani joined USM Alger from Waalwijk for three seasons. But his stint with the club was short, and he left during the winter transfer window after playing only two games to return to Europe, where he joined Hungarian club Budapest Honvéd on a six-month contract with a two-year option. In the first season he reached the Magyar Kupa final where they lost 1–2 against MOL Vidi. The following season, Mezghrani missed half of the campaign due to an injury. He played his first game of the season on 22 February 2020 against Puskás Akadémia. Mezghrani won his first title at the end of the season, the Magyar Kupa.

On 3 January 2022, Mezghrani signed a two-and-a-half-year contract with Puskás Akadémia.

On 8 February 2024, after spending the winter training with Ekstraklasa club Warta Poznań, Mezghrani joined the Polish side on a free transfer, signing a deal until the end of the season with an option for another year. After Warta suffered relegation to the I liga, Mezghrani's contract was not extended.

On 29 August 2024, he signed a one-year deal with another I liga club Ruch Chorzów, reuniting with his former Warta manager Dawid Szulczek. On 21 January 2025, he penned a new contract, tying him with the club until mid-2026 with an option for another year. He was released by Ruch at the end of the 2025–26 season.

== Career statistics ==
As of match played 17 May 2026

Appearances and goals by club, season and competition
Club	Season	League			National cup (Note: Includes KNVB Cup, Magyar Kupa, Polish Cup)		Continental		Other		Total	
Club	Season	Division	Apps	Goals	Apps	Goals	Apps	Goals	Apps	Goals	Apps	Goals
Waalwijk	2016–17	Eerste Divisie	27	0	2	0	—		2 (Note: Appearances in Eerste Divisie promotion play-offs)	0	31	0
Waalwijk	2017–18	Eerste Divisie	20	1	1	0	—		—		21	1
Waalwijk	Total		47	1	3	0	—		2	0	52	1
USM Alger	2018–19	Ligue 1	2	0	—		—		—		2	0
Budapest Honvéd	2018–19	Nemzeti Bajnokság I	11	0	4	0	—		—		15	0
Budapest Honvéd	2019–20	Nemzeti Bajnokság I	11	0	5	0	—		—		16	0
Budapest Honvéd	2020–21	Nemzeti Bajnokság I	25	1	3	0	2 (Note: Appearances in UEFA Europa League)	0	—		30	1
Budapest Honvéd	2021–22	Nemzeti Bajnokság I	7	0	0	0	—		—		7	0
Budapest Honvéd	Total		54	1	12	0	2	0	—		68	1
Puskás Akadémia	2021–22	Nemzeti Bajnokság I	2	0	0	0	—		—		2	0
Puskás Akadémia	2022–23	Nemzeti Bajnokság I	21	0	1	0	2 (Note: Appearances in UEFA Europa Conference League)	0	—		24	0
Puskás Akadémia	Total		23	0	1	0	2	0	—		26	0
Warta Poznań	2023–24	Ekstraklasa	12	0	—		—		—		12	0
Ruch Chorzów	2024–25	I liga	26	3	5	0	—		—		31	3
Ruch Chorzów	2025–26	I liga	15	1	0	0	—		—		15	1
Ruch Chorzów	Total		41	4	5	0	—		—		46	4
Career total			179	5	21	0	4	0	2	0	206	5

== Honours ==
Budapest Honvéd

- Hungarian Cup: 2019–20
