= Norbert Balogh =

Hungarian international footballer

Personal information
- Full name: Norbert Sándor Balogh
- Date of birth: 21 February 1996 (age 30)
- Place of birth: Hajdúböszörmény, Hungary
- Height: 1.97 m (6 ft 5 1/2 in)
- Positions: Striker; winger

Team information
- Current team: DAC 1904
- Number: 19

Youth career
- 2004–2006: Hajdúböszörmény
- 2006–2014: Debrecen

Senior career*
| Years | Team | Apps | (Gls) |
| 2014–2015 | Debrecen | 33 | (5) |
| 2014 | → Létavértes SC '97 (loan) | 11 | (2) |
| 2016–2019 | Palermo | 22 | (0) |
| 2018–2019 | → APOEL (loan) | 12 | (2) |
| 2019–2020 | Hull City | 3 | (0) |
| 2020–2022 | Budapest Honvéd | 39 | (10) |
| 2022 | → DAC Dunajská Streda (loan) | 12 | (2) |
| 2022–2024 | DAC Dunajská Streda | 7 | (0) |
| 2023 | → Vasas (loan) | 8 | (0) |
| 2023–2024 | → Kisvárda (loan) | 16 | (2) |

International career^{‡}
| 2014 | Hungary U18 | 1 | (0) |
| 2014 | Hungary U19 | 6 | (1) |
| 2015 | Hungary U20 | 1 | (0) |
| 2015–2018 | Hungary U21 | 7 | (1) |
| 2017 | Hungary | 2 | (0) |
- * Club domestic league appearances and goals as of 18 May 2024 ‡ National team caps and goals as of 19:12, 15 January 2021 (UTC)

Norbert Sándor Balogh (born 21 February 1996) is a Hungarian footballer who last played as a forward for Slovak club DAC Dunajská Streda and the Hungarian national team.

== Club career ==
Balogh grew up in very poor circumstances in a Roma neighbourhood of Hajdúböszörmény, Hajdú County, Hungary. His parents did not earn enough money, therefore he often starved. Balogh's parents could not afford to buy new shoes for him, therefore he was often mocked at school. In an interview with Nemzeti Sport, Balogh said that he did not mind that he was brought up in poor circumstances because as an adult he can appreciate the success more. But he never forgets where he comes from. He is still in touch with his old friends from his birthplace. He remembers during the summers he played football with his friends even if they did not have food. He started playing football in the football club of Hajdúböszörmény and he was spotted during an exhibition match by László Arany, who invited him to go to the academy of Debreceni VSC. When he was 17 he got a contract from Debrecen and he rented a flat there. He sent some of his earning to his parents who got divorced. When he was selected for the first squad of the club his father had to go to prison which hurt Balogh. His father is an important person in his life because he taught him a lot and persuaded him to become a footballer.

=== Early career ===
On 1 August 2014, Balogh debuted in the 2014–15 Nemzeti Bajnokság I season against MTK Budapest in a 1–0 defeat at the Bozsik József Stadion. On 17 May 2015, he scored his first and second goal for Debrecen in the 2014–15 Nemzeti Bajnokság I season in a 4–0 victory against Lombard-Pápa TFC. In the 2015–16 Nemzeti Bajnokság I season, Balogh finished on the top in many statistics. He engaged in most battles (605) among which he won 250 (overtook only by Suljic). On 26 December 2015, Balogh was invited to see the 2015-16 Premier League match between Chelsea F.C. and Watford F.C. On 9 January 2016, Ajax Amsterdam offered Debreceni VSC 1.5 million € to purchase Balogh.

=== Palermo ===
On 13 January 2016, Balogh was signed by Serie A club U.S. Città di Palermo. The transfer fee was €2,200,000.

=== APOEL FC ===
On 21 August 2018, he was loaned to the Cypriot First Division club APOEL. On 3 December 2018, he played his first match in the 2018–19 Cypriot First Division in a 5–1 victory against Apollon Limassol at the GSP Stadium, Nicosia. He entered the pitch in 67th minute as a substitute for Léo Natel. On 19 December 2018, Balogh scored his first goal against Ayia Napa FC in the first round of the 2018–19 Cypriot Cup in the GSP Stadium, Nicosia. On 20 February 2019, he scored twice against Doxa Katokopias FC in a Cypriot Cup match. On 24 February 2019 he scored his first goal in the Cypriot First Division away to AEL Limassol.

Following Palermo's exclusion from the Serie B, he was released together with all other players in July 2019, thus becoming a free agent.

=== Hull City ===
On 14 September 2019, after a week of training with the team, it was announced ahead of Hull City's home game against Wigan Athletic that Balogh had signed permanently with The Tigers, on a one-year deal, with an option for a further 12 months. He made his debut on 23 October 2019, in a 1–2 away win against Nottingham Forest when he came on as a substitute for Jon Toral. On 29 May 2020, he left the club by mutual consent.

=== Vasas ===
On 14 February 2023, Balogh joined Vasas on loan.

== International career ==
Balogh was a member of the Hungarian U-19 squad at the 2014 UEFA European Under-19 Championship.

== Career statistics ==
=== Club ===
As of 15 May 2022

Appearances and goals by club, season and competition
| Club | Season | League | | | National Cup (Note: Includes Magyar Kupa, Coppa Italia, Cypriot Cup, and FA Cup) | | League Cup (Note: Includes Ligakupa and EFL Cup) | | Europe | | Total | |
| Club | Season | Division | Apps | Goals | Apps | Goals | Apps | Goals | Apps | Goals | Apps | Goals |
|---|---|---|---|---|---|---|---|---|---|---|---|---|
| Létavértes | 2013–14 | Nemzeti Bajnokság III | 11 | 2 | 0 | 0 | 0 | 0 | 0 | 0 | 11 | 2 |
| Debrecen | 2014–15 | Nemzeti Bajnokság I | 15 | 2 | 0 | 0 | 6 | 1 | 0 | 0 | 21 | 3 |
| Debrecen | 2015–16 | Nemzeti Bajnokság I | 18 | 3 | 0 | 0 | 0 | 0 | 6 | 2 | 24 | 5 |
| Debrecen | Total | | 33 | 5 | 0 | 0 | 6 | 1 | 6 | 2 | 45 | 8 |
| Palermo | 2015–16 | Serie A | 4 | 0 | 0 | 0 | – | | – | | 4 | 0 |
| Palermo | 2016–17 | Serie A | 16 | 0 | 2 | 0 | – | | – | | 18 | 0 |
| Palermo | 2017–18 | Serie B | 2 | 0 | 2 | 0 | – | | – | | 4 | 0 |
| Palermo | Total | | 22 | 0 | 4 | 0 | – | | – | | 26 | 0 |
| APOEL | 2018–19 | Cypriot First Division | 12 | 2 | 5 | 3 | – | | 0 | 0 | 17 | 5 |
| Hull City | 2019–20 | Championship | 3 | 0 | 0 | 0 | 0 | 0 | – | | 3 | 0 |
| Budapest Honvéd | 2020–21 | Nemzeti Bajnokság I | 26 | 10 | 0 | 0 | – | | 1 | 0 | 27 | 10 |
| Budapest Honvéd | 2021–22 | Nemzeti Bajnokság I | 13 | 0 | 2 | 2 | – | | – | | 15 | 2 |
| Budapest Honvéd | Total | | 39 | 10 | 2 | 2 | – | | 1 | 0 | 42 | 12 |
| Career total | | | 120 | 19 | 11 | 5 | 6 | 1 | 7 | 2 | 144 | 27 |

=== International ===
As of match played 24 March 2019

Appearances and goals by national team and year
| National team | Year | Apps | Goals |
|---|---|---|---|
| Hungary | 2017 | 2 | 0 |
| Hungary | 2018 | – | – |
| Hungary | 2019 | 0 | 0 |
| Hungary | 2020 | – | – |
| Total | | 2 | 0 |

== Honours ==
APOEL

- Cypriot First Division: 2018–19
