= Márton Eppel =

Hungarian footballer (born 1991)

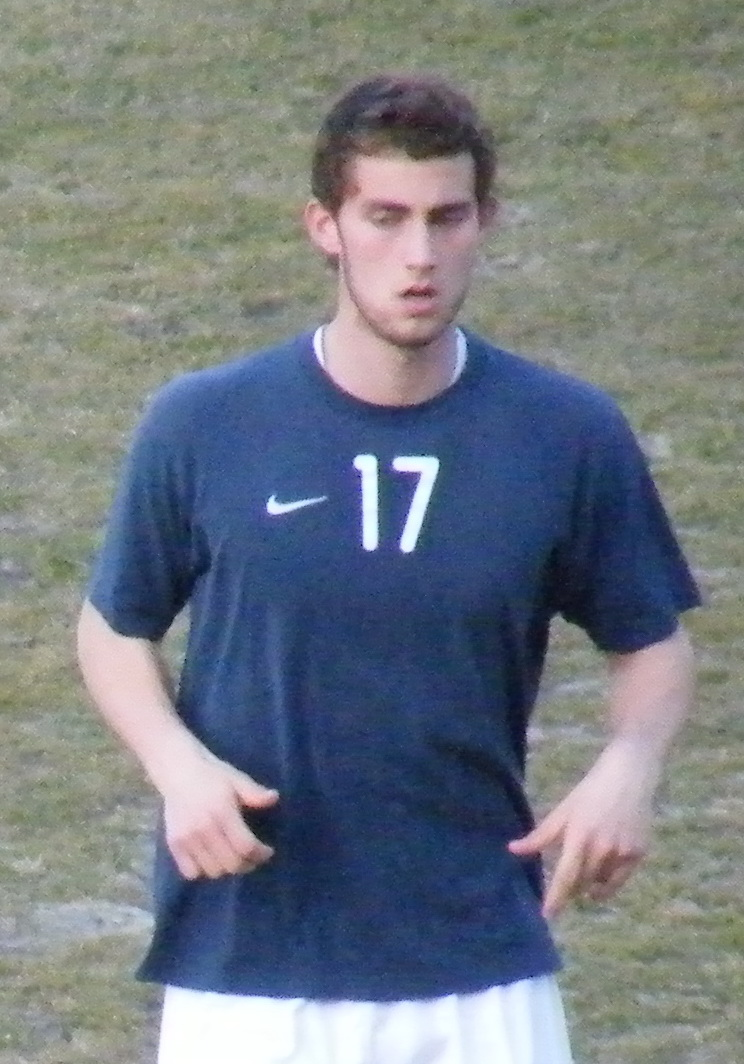
- Eppel in 2011

Personal information
- Date of birth: 20 November 1991 (age 34)
- Place of birth: Budapest, Hungary
- Height: 1.90 m (6 ft 3 in)
- Position: Forward

Team information
- Current team: FK Csíkszereda
- Number: 27

Youth career
- 2002–2003: Magyar AC
- 2003–2008: MTK Budapest

Senior career*
Years	Team	Apps	(Gls)
2008–2011	MTK Budapest	27	(3)
2008–2011	MTK Budapest II	29	(10)
2011–2012	NEC	1	(0)
2012–2015	Paks	34	(6)
2012	Paks II	15	(0)
2013–2014	→ MTK Budapest (loan)	22	(1)
2015–2016	Dunaújváros	25	(6)
2016–2018	Budapest Honvéd	70	(35)
2018–2020	Kairat	41	(19)
2020	Cercle Brugge	8	(1)
2020–2022	Budapest Honvéd	24	(1)
2022–2023	Diósgyőr	46	(7)
2023–2024	Warta Poznań	21	(2)
2024–2025	Nyíregyháza	26	(4)
2025–	FK Csíkszereda	51	(17)

International career
2008	Hungary U17	3	(0)
2011–2012	Hungary U21	6	(1)
2017–2018	Hungary	8	(0)
- * Club domestic league appearances and goals as of 7 November 2026

Márton Eppel (born 20 November 1991) is a Hungarian professional footballer who plays as a forward for Liga I club FK Csíkszereda.

== Career ==
=== NEC ===
Eppel moved to N.E.C. on a season-long loan in August 2011. N.E.C had a first option to buy him during his period at the club.

=== Honvéd ===
Eppel won the 2016–17 Nemzeti Bajnokság I season with Budapest Honvéd and he also became the top scorer that season.

=== Kairat ===
On 2 July 2018, Kairat announced the signing of Eppel on an 18-month contract. Eppel scored five goals out of ten in his debut against Andorran side UE Engordany in the first qualifying round of the 2018–19 UEFA Europa League.

=== Cercle Brugge ===
On 14 January 2020, Cercle Brugge announced the signing of Eppel on a contract until the end of the 2019–20 season.

=== Return to Honvéd ===
On 20 October 2020, Eppel signed with Honvéd, returning for a second stint.

=== Diósgyőr ===
On 6 January 2022, Eppel joined Diósgyőr.

=== Warta Poznań ===
After leaving Diósgyőr at the end of the 2022–23 campaign, Eppel remained without a club until 20 October 2023, when he joined Polish club Warta Poznań on a contract until the end of the season. Three days later, he made his debut in the starting line-up in a 0–1 away win against Stal Mielec. Following Warta's relegation to the I liga at the end of the season, he was released by the club.

=== Nyíregyháza ===
On 25 July 2024, Eppel returned to Hungary to join newly promoted Nyíregyháza on a two-year deal.

=== Csíkszereda ===
On 23 July 2025, Eppel signed to Romania to join newly promoted FK Csíkszereda.

== International career ==
Eppel debuted for the Hungary national team against Russia in a friendly match at Groupama Aréna, Budapest on 5 June 2017, and scored an own goal on his debut.

Four days later, on 9 June 2017, he played his second match against Andorra in a 1–0 defeat in the 2018 FIFA World Cup qualifiers in Andorra.

== Career statistics ==
=== Club ===
As of matches played 7 November 2026

Appearances and goals by club, season and competition
Club	Season	League			National cup (Note: Includes Magyar Kupa, KNVB Cup, Polish Cup, Cupa României)		League cup (Note: Includes Ligakupa)		Europe		Other		Total	
Club	Season	Division	Apps	Goals	Apps	Goals	Apps	Goals	Apps	Goals	Apps	Goals	Apps	Goals
MTK Budapest	2007–08	Nemzeti Bajnokság I	—		—		1	0	—		—		1	0
MTK Budapest	2008–09	Nemzeti Bajnokság I	6	0	1	0	8	0	0	0	0	0	15	0
MTK Budapest	2010–11	Nemzeti Bajnokság I	21	3	4	0	1	1	—		—		26	4
MTK Budapest	Total		27	3	5	0	10	1	0	0	0	0	42	4
MTK Budapest II	2008–09	Nemzeti Bajnokság II	16	5	—		—		—		—		16	5
MTK Budapest II	2019–10	Nemzeti Bajnokság II	2	0	—		—		—		—		2	0
MTK Budapest II	2010–11	Nemzeti Bajnokság II	11	5	—		—		—		—		11	5
MTK Budapest II	Total		29	10	—		—		—		—		29	10
NEC	2011–12	Eredivisie	1	0	1	0	—		—		—		2	0
Paks	2011–12	Nemzeti Bajnokság I	3	0	—		2	0	—		—		5	0
Paks	2012–13	Nemzeti Bajnokság I	23	4	2	0	5	1	—		—		30	5
Paks	2013–14	Nemzeti Bajnokság I	3	0	—		—		—		—		3	0
Paks	2014–15	Nemzeti Bajnokság I	5	2	0	0	2	0	—		—		7	2
Paks	Total		34	6	2	0	9	1	—		—		45	7
Paks II	2011–12	Nemzeti Bajnokság II	10	0	—		—		—		—		10	0
Paks II	2012–13	Nemzeti Bajnokság II	5	0	—		—		—		—		5	0
Paks II	Total		15	0	—		—		—		—		15	0
MTK Budapest (loan)	2013–14	Nemzeti Bajnokság I	22	1	6	2	3	2	—		—		31	5
Dunaújváros	2014–15	Nemzeti Bajnokság I	11	3	—		—		—		—		11	3
Dunaújváros	2015–16	Nemzeti Bajnokság II	14	3	1	0	—		—		—		15	3
Dunaújváros	Total		25	6	1	0	—		—		—		26	6
Budapest Honvéd	2015–16	Nemzeti Bajnokság I	11	5	—		—		—		—		11	5
Budapest Honvéd	2016–17	Nemzeti Bajnokság I	27	16	2	0	—		—		—		29	16
Budapest Honvéd	2017–18	Nemzeti Bajnokság I	32	14	6	3	—		2 (Note: Appearances in UEFA Champions League)	0	—		40	17
Budapest Honvéd	Total		70	35	8	3	—		2	0	—		80	39
Kairat	2018	Kazakhstan Premier League	13	3	0	0	—		6 (Note: Appearances in UEFA Europa League)	6	—		19	9
Kairat	2019	Kazakhstan Premier League	28	16	0	0	—		3	0	0	0	31	16
Kairat	Total		41	19	0	0	—		9	6	0	0	50	25
Cercle Brugge	2019–20	Belgian First Division A	8	1	—		—		—		—		8	1
Budapest Honvéd	2020–21	Nemzeti Bajnokság I	12	1	0	0	—		—		—		12	1
Budapest Honvéd	2021–22	Nemzeti Bajnokság I	12	0	2	1	—		—		—		14	1
Budapest Honvéd	Total		24	1	2	1	—		—		—		26	2
Diósgyőr	2021–22	Nemzeti Bajnokság II	15	3	—		—		—		—		15	3
Diósgyőr	2022–23	Nemzeti Bajnokság II	31	4	1	0	—		—		—		32	4
Diósgyőr	Total		46	7	1	0	—		—		—		47	7
Warta Poznań	2023–24	Ekstraklasa	21	2	1	0	—		—		—		22	2
Nyíregyháza	2024–25	Nemzeti Bajnokság I	26	4	4	1	—		—		—		30	5
FK Csíkszereda	2025–26	Liga I	36	12	4	9	—		—		—		40	21
FK Csíkszereda	2026–27	Liga I	15	5	2	1	—		—		—		17	6
FK Csíkszereda	Total		51	17	6	10	—		—		—		57	27
Career total			440	112	37	17	22	4	11	6	0	0	510	139

=== International ===
As of match played on 15 October 2018

Appearances and goals by national team and year
National team	Year	Apps	Goals
Hungary	2017	4	0
Hungary	2018	4	0
Total		8	0

== Honours ==
MTK Budapest

- Szuperkupa: 2008

Budapest Honvéd

- Nemzeti Bajnokság I: 2016–17

Kairat

- Kazakhstan Cup: 2018
- Kazakhstan Super Cup runner-up: 2019

Diósgyőr

- Nemzeti Bajnokság II: 2022–23

Individual

- Nemzeti Bajnokság I top scorer: 2016–17 (16 goals)
