= Boubacar Traoré (footballer, born 1999) =

Malian footballer

Personal information
- Date of birth: 14 December 1999 (age 26)
- Place of birth: San, Mali
- Height: 1.90 m (6 ft 3 in)
- Position: Forward

Team information
- Current team: MC Oran
- Number: 11

Senior career*
Years	Team	Apps	(Gls)
2018–2019	Stade Malien		
2019–2020	CA Bizertin	16	(6)
2020–2023	Budapest Honvéd	36	(3)
2021	→ Sporting Kansas City II (loan)	0	(0)
2023–2024	US Monastir	24	(13)
2024–2026	Al-Ahly	5	(5)
2026–	MC Oran	11	(2)

International career^{‡}
2023–	Mali	4	(0)
- * Club domestic league appearances and goals as of 6 June 2025 ‡ National team caps and goals as of 16 January 2024

Boubacar Traoré (born 14 December 1999) is a Malian footballer who plays as a forward for Algerian club MC Oran and the Mali national team.

== Club career ==
On 23 January 2023, he joined Tunisian club US Monastir. On 23 January 2024, he signed for Libyan club Al-Ahly. On 28 January 2026, he joined Algerian club MC Oran.

== Career statistics ==
=== Club ===
As of 27 May 2024

Club	Season	League			National Cup		Continental		Total	
Club	Season	Division	Apps	Goals	Apps	Goals	Apps	Goals	Apps	Goals
Stade Malien	2018–19	Ligue 1	—		—		—		—	
CA Bizertin	2018–19	CLP-1	4	1	—		—		4	1
CA Bizertin	2019–20	CLP-1	12	5	0	0	—		12	5
CA Bizertin	Total		16	6	0	0	0	0	16	6
Budapest Honvéd	2020–21	Nemzeti Bajnokság I	18	2	2	1	2	1	22	4
Budapest Honvéd	2021–22	Nemzeti Bajnokság I	12	1	1	0	—		13	1
Budapest Honvéd	2022–23	Nemzeti Bajnokság I	6	0	0	0	—		6	1
Budapest Honvéd	Total		36	3	3	1	2	1	41	5
US Monastir	2022–23	CLP-1	11	3	0	0	8 (Note: Appearances in CAF Confederation Cup)	3	19	6
US Monastir	2023–24	CLP-1	12	10	3	0	0	0	15	10
US Monastir	Total		23	13	3	0	8	3	36	16
Al-Ahly Benghazi	2023–24	Libyan Premier League	5	5	0	0	—		5	5
Career total			80	27	6	1	10	4	96	31

=== International ===
As of match played on 16 January 2024

Appearances and goals by national team and year
National team	Year	Apps	Goals
Mali	2023	3	0
Mali	2024	1	0
Total		4	0
