= Péter Tóth (footballer, born 2001) =

Hungarian footballer

Personal information
- Date of birth: 10 April 2001 (age 25)
- Place of birth: Gyula, Hungary
- Height: 1.81 m (5 ft 11 in)
- Position: Midfielder

Youth career
- 2008–2011: Battonyai TK
- 2011–2012: Mezőhegyesi SE
- 2012–2015: Békéscsaba
- 2015–2020: Honvéd

Senior career*
Years	Team	Apps	(Gls)
2020–2022	Honvéd	1	(0)
2020	→ Ajka (loan)	4	(0)
2021	→ Békéscsaba (loan)	3	(0)
2022	Kozármisleny	19	(1)
- * Club domestic league appearances and goals as of 24 April 2022

Péter Tóth (born 10 April 2001) is a Hungarian footballer who plays as a midfielder.

== Career statistics ==
=== Club ===
As of 7 June 2020.

Club	Season	League			National Cup		League Cup		Other		Total	
Club	Season	Division	Apps	Goals	Apps	Goals	Apps	Goals	Apps	Goals	Apps	Goals
Budapest Honvéd	2019–20	Nemzeti Bajnokság I	1	0	0	0	0	0	0	0	1	0
Career total			1	0	0	0	0	0	0	0	1	0
