= Bertalan Bocskay =

Hungarian footballer

Personal information
- Date of birth: 2 March 2002 (age 24)
- Place of birth: Budapest, Hungary
- Height: 1.85 m (6 ft 1 in)
- Position: Central midfielder

Team information
- Current team: Kecskemét
- Number: 4

Youth career
- 2008–2014: Budakeszi Labdarúgó Akadémia
- 2014–2017: Vasas
- 2017–2020: Budapest Honvéd

Senior career*
Years	Team	Apps	(Gls)
2020–2024	Budapest Honvéd	65	(1)
2021–2022	→ TSC (loan)	16	(0)
2024–	Kecskemét	36	(0)
- * Club domestic league appearances and goals as of 31 May 2026

Bertalan Bocskay (born 2 March 2002) is a Hungarian professional footballer who plays for Kecskemét as a midfielder.

== Career statistics ==
As of 15 May 2021.

Appearances and goals by club, season and competition
Club	Season	League			National Cup		Continental		Other		Total	
Club	Season	Division	Apps	Goals	Apps	Goals	Apps	Goals	Apps	Goals	Apps	Goals
Budapest Honvéd	2020–21	Nemzeti Bajnokság I	14	0	1	0	1 (Note: Appearance in UEFA Europa League)	0	—		16	0
Career total			14	0	1	0	1	0	0	0	16	0
