= Kristóf Tóth-Gábor =

Hungarian footballer (born 2001)

- Tóth-Gábor playing for Szeged-Csanád in 2026

Personal information
- Date of birth: 11 September 2001 (age 25)
- Place of birth: Nagykanizsa, Hungary
- Height: 1.84 m (6 ft 0 in)
- Position: Forward

Team information
- Current team: Szeged-Csanád
- Number: 11

Youth career
- 2010–2015: Nagykanizsa
- 2015–2019: Haladás

Senior career*
Years	Team	Apps	(Gls)
2019–2020	Haladás	15	(6)
2020–2022	Honvéd	6	(0)
2020–2022	Honvéd II	5	(2)
2021	→ Kazincbarcika (loan)	16	(1)
2021–2022	→ Haladás (loan)	24	(2)
2022–2024	Pécs	68	(13)
2024–2025	Szentlőrinci	39	(12)
2026–	Szeged-Csanád	13	(3)

International career^{‡}
2017	Hungary U-16	7	(1)
2017–2018	Hungary U-17	14	(7)
2019	Hungary U-19	3	(1)
2021–	Hungary U-21	6	(1)
- * Club domestic league appearances and goals as of 31 May 2026 ‡ National team caps and goals as of 7 June 2022

Kristóf Tóth-Gábor (born 11 September 2001) is a Hungarian professional footballer who plays as a forward for Nemzeti Bajnokság II club Szeged-Csanád.

== Club career ==
On 12 August 2021, Tóth-Gábor returned to Haladás on a season-long loan.

On 7 July 2022, Tóth-Gábor signed with Pécs.

== Career statistics ==
As of 4 November 2020.

Appearances and goals by club, season and competition
Club	Season	League			Cup		Continental		Other		Total	
Club	Season	Division	Apps	Goals	Apps	Goals	Apps	Goals	Apps	Goals	Apps	Goals
Szombathelyi Haladás	2019–20	Nemzeti Bajnokság II	15	6	3	0	—		—		18	6
Szombathelyi Haladás	Total		15	6	3	0	0	0	0	0	18	6
Budapest Honvéd	2020–21	Nemzeti Bajnokság I	6	0	2	2	1	0	—		9	2
Budapest Honvéd	Total		6	0	2	2	1	0	0	0	9	2
Career total			21	6	5	2	1	0	0	0	27	8
