= Krisztián Tamás =

Hungarian footballer

Personal information
- Date of birth: 18 April 1995 (age 31)
- Place of birth: Budapest, Hungary
- Height: 1.80 m (5 ft 11 in)
- Position: Left back

Team information
- Current team: Újpest
- Number: 22

Youth career
- 2005–2008: Újpest
- 2008–2011: Szombathelyi Haladas
- 2011–2014: AC Milan

Senior career*
Years	Team	Apps	(Gls)
2014–2015	AC Milan	0	(0)
2014	→ Varese (loan)	4	(0)
2015	→ Slavia Prague (loan)	11	(0)
2015–2017	Spezia	5	(0)
2017	Gyirmót	7	(1)
2017–2020	Fehérvár	18	(2)
2019–2020	→ Zalaegerszeg (loan)	17	(0)
2020–2023	Budapest Honvéd	80	(4)
2023–	Újpest	38	(1)

International career^{‡}
2011–2013	Hungary U16	2	(0)
2011–2013	Hungary U17	4	(5)
2011–2013	Hungary U18	1	(0)
2012–2014	Hungary U19	8	(0)
2014–2015	Hungary U21	2	(0)
- * Club domestic league appearances and goals as of 19 January 2026 ‡ National team caps and goals as of 5 December 2015 (UTC)

Krisztián Tamás (born 18 April 1995) is a Hungarian professional footballer who plays for OTP Bank Liga club Újpest in Hungary.

== Club career ==
Tamás played for the youth academy of Szombathelyi Haladas till 2011. Then he went a trial with Italian heavyweights AC Milan. Other European clubs like Arsenal and Tottenham Hotspur were reportedly interested in securing his services. But Tamás successfully joined the youth academy of AC Milan.

=== Varese ===
On 27 July 2014, he joined Serie B team Varese on a season long loan. He made his debut in a Coppa Italia match against Juve Stabia.

=== Slavia Prague ===
On 30 January 2015, Tamás was loaned to Slavia Praha ona 6-month deal.

On 21 February 2015, Tamás played his first match with Slavia against Slovan Liberec at the Stadion u Nisy, in Liberec, Czech Republic in the 2014–15 Czech First League.

== Career statistics ==
Appearances and goals by club, season and competition
Club	Season	League		Cup		Europe		Total	
Club	Season	Apps	Goals	Apps	Goals	Apps	Goals	Apps	Goals
Varese
Varese	2014–15	4	0	2	0	–	–	6	0
Varese	Total	4	0	2	0	–	–	6	0
Slavia Prague
Slavia Prague	2014–15	11	0	0	0	–	–	11	0
Slavia Prague	Total	11	0	0	0	–	–	11	0
Spezia
Spezia	2015–16	4	0	1	0	–	–	5	0
Spezia	2016–17	1	0	0	0	–	–	1	0
Spezia	Total	5	0	1	0	–	–	6	0
Gyirmót
Gyirmót	2016–17	7	1	1	0	–	–	8	1
Gyirmót	Total	7	1	1	0	–	–	8	1
Videoton
Videoton	2017–18	7	1	3	2	1	0	11	3
Videoton	2018–19	11	1	5	0	1	0	17	1
Videoton	Total	18	2	8	2	2	0	28	4
Zalaegerszeg
Zalaegerszeg	2019–20	17	0	0	0	–	–	17	0
Zalaegerszeg	Total	17	0	0	0	–	–	17	0
Budapest Honvéd
Budapest Honvéd	2020–21	22	2	2	0	0	0	24	2
Budapest Honvéd	2021–22	29	2	3	0	–	–	32	2
Budapest Honvéd	Total	51	4	5	0	0	0	56	4
Career total		113	7	17	2	2	0	132	9

Updated to games played as of 15 May 2022.

== International career ==
He was also part of the Hungarian U-19 at the 2014 UEFA European Under-19 Championship and U-20 team at the 2015 FIFA U-20 World Cup.
