= Attila Berla =

Hungarian football player

Personal information
- Full name: Attila Berla
- Date of birth: 8 April 1999 (age 27)
- Place of birth: Budapest, Hungary
- Height: 1.93 m (6 ft 4 in)
- Position: Goalkeeper

Team information
- Current team: Budapest Honvéd
- Number: 66

Youth career
- 2008–2010: Tura
- 2010–2017: Budapest Honvéd

Senior career*
Years	Team	Apps	(Gls)
2017–	Budapest Honvéd	2	(0)
2017–	→ Budapest Honvéd II	53	(0)
2019–2020	→ Ajka (loan)	1	(0)
- * Club domestic league appearances and goals as of 15 May 2022

Attila Berla (born 8 April 1999) is a Hungarian football player who currently plays for Budapest Honvéd.

== Career ==
=== Budapest Honvéd ===
On 4 August 2019, Berla played his first match for Budapest Honvéd in a 1–2 loss against Diósgyőr in the Hungarian League.

== Club statistics ==
Appearances and goals by club, season and competition
Club	Season	League			Cup		Europe		Total	
Club	Season	Division	Apps	Goals	Apps	Goals	Apps	Goals	Apps	Goals
Budapest Honvéd II
Budapest Honvéd II	2017–18	Nemzeti Bajnokság III	18	0	—		—		18	0
Budapest Honvéd II	2018–19	Nemzeti Bajnokság III	15	0	—		—		15	0
Budapest Honvéd II	2019–20	Nemzeti Bajnokság III	4	0	—		—		4	0
Budapest Honvéd II	2020–21	Nemzeti Bajnokság III	6	0	—		—		6	0
Budapest Honvéd II	2021–22	Nemzeti Bajnokság III	10	0	—		—		10	0
Budapest Honvéd II	Total		53	0	0	0	0	0	53	0
Ajka	2019–20	Nemzeti Bajnokság II	1	0	0	0	—		1	0
Budapest Honvéd
Budapest Honvéd	2019–20	Nemzeti Bajnokság I	2	0	0	0	1	0	3	0
Budapest Honvéd	2020–21	Nemzeti Bajnokság I	0	0	1	0	0	0	1	0
Budapest Honvéd	2021–22	Nemzeti Bajnokság I	0	0	0	0	—		0	0
Budapest Honvéd	Total		2	0	1	0	1	0	4	0
Career total			56	0	1	0	1	0	58	0

Updated to games played as of 15 May 2022.
