= Noel Keresztes =

Hungarian footballer

Personal information
- Date of birth: 16 September 2004 (age 22)
- Place of birth: Pécs, Hungary
- Height: 1.84 m (6 ft 0 in)
- Position: Midfielder

Team information
- Current team: Budapest Honvéd
- Number: 22

Youth career
- 2009–2014: Kozármisleny
- 2014–2018: Pécs
- 2018–2020: Budapest Honvéd

Senior career*
| Years | Team | Apps | (Gls) |
| 2020– | Budapest Honvéd | 62 | (3) |
| 2020–2024 | → Budapest Honvéd II | 45 | (7) |
| 2022 | → Siófok (loan) | 1 | (0) |

International career^{‡}
| 2019 | Hungary U-15 | 5 | (0) |
| 2019–2020 | Hungary U-16 | 8 | (2) |
| 2021 | Hungary U-17 | 1 | (0) |
| 2021–2022 | Hungary U-18 | 3 | (0) |
| 2022– | Hungary U-19 | 2 | (0) |
- * Club domestic league appearances and goals as of 10 June 2025 ‡ National team caps and goals as of 19 November 2022

Noel Keresztes (born 16 September 2004) is a Hungarian professional footballer who plays for Budapest Honvéd.

== Career statistics ==
As of 15 May 2022.

Appearances and goals by club, season and competition
| Club | Season | League | | | Cup | | Continental | | Other | | Total | | |
| Club | Season | Division | Apps | Goals | Apps | Goals | Apps | Goals | Apps | Goals | Apps | Goals | |
|---|---|---|---|---|---|---|---|---|---|---|---|---|---|
| Budapest Honvéd II | 2020–21 | Nemzeti Bajnokság III | 13 | 1 | — | | — | | — | | 13 | 1 | |
| Budapest Honvéd II | 2021–22 | Nemzeti Bajnokság III | 32 | 6 | — | | — | | — | | 32 | 6 | |
| Budapest Honvéd II | Total | | 45 | 7 | 0 | 0 | 0 | 0 | 0 | 0 | 45 | 7 | |
| Budapest Honvéd | 2020–21 | Nemzeti Bajnokság I | 1 | 0 | 0 | 0 | 0 | 0 | — | | 1 | 0 | |
| Budapest Honvéd | 2021–22 | Nemzeti Bajnokság I | Nemzeti Bajnokság I | 0 | 0 | 1 | 0 | — | | — | | 1 | 0 |
| Budapest Honvéd | Total | | Nemzeti Bajnokság I | 1 | 0 | 1 | 0 | 0 | 0 | 0 | 0 | 2 | 0 |
| Career total | | | 46 | 7 | 1 | 0 | 0 | 0 | 0 | 0 | 47 | 7 | |
