= Donát Zsótér =

Hungarian footballer (born 1996

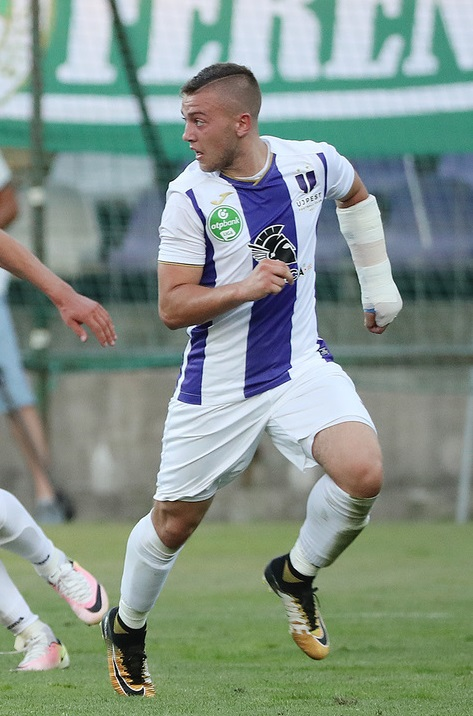
- Zsótér playing for Újpest in 2017

Personal information
- Full name: Donát Ferenc Zsótér
- Date of birth: 6 January 1996 (age 30)
- Place of birth: Szeged, Hungary
- Height: 1.67 m (5 ft 5 1/2 in)
- Position: Winger

Team information
- Current team: Videoton Fehérvár
- Number: 21

Youth career
- 2005–2009: Tisza Volán
- 2009–2013: Videoton

Senior career*
Years	Team	Apps	(Gls)
2013–2016	Videoton	0	(0)
2014	→ Szolnok (loan)	13	(3)
2014	→ Dunaújváros (loan)	14	(0)
2015–2016	→ Puskás Akadémia (loan)	27	(2)
2016–2017	Sint-Truidense	0	(0)
2016–2017	→ Budapest Honvéd (loan)	22	(3)
2017–2020	Újpest	86	(9)
2020–2023	Budapest Honvéd	80	(8)
2023–2025	Kecskemét	55	(2)
2025–	Videoton Fehérvár	23	(1)

International career^{‡}
2012–2014	Hungary U-17	3	(2)
2014	Hungary U-18	1	(1)
2014	Hungary U-19	4	(0)
2015	Hungary U-20	7	(2)
2015–2017	Hungary U-21	10	(1)
- * Club domestic league appearances and goals as of 31 May 2026 ‡ National team caps and goals as of 16 October 2018

Donát Ferenc Zsótér (born 6 January 1996) is a Hungarian professional footballer who plays as a winger for Nemzeti Bajnokság II club Videoton Fehérvár. He was also part of the Hungarian U-19 at the 2014 UEFA European Under-19 Championship and U-20 team at the 2015 FIFA U-20 World Cup.

== Club statistics ==
As of match played 15 May 2022

Appearances and goals by club, season and competition
Club	Season	League			Cup		League Cup		Europe		Total	
Club	Season	Division	Apps	Goals	Apps	Goals	Apps	Goals	Apps	Goals	Apps	Goals
Videoton	2012–13	Nemzeti Bajnokság I	0	0	2	0	6	0	—		8	0
Videoton	2013–14	Nemzeti Bajnokság I	0	0	0	0	4	0	—		4	0
Videoton	Total		0	0	2	0	10	0	–	–	12	0
Szolnok	2013–14	Nemzeti Bajnokság II	13	3	0	0	1	0	—		14	3
Dunaújváros	2014–15	Nemzeti Bajnokság I	14	0	1	0	4	0	—		19	0
Puskás Akadémia	2014–15	Nemzeti Bajnokság I	10	0	0	0	0	0	—		10	0
Puskás Akadémia	2015–16	Nemzeti Bajnokság I	17	2	1	0	—		—		18	2
Puskás Akadémia	Total		27	2	1	0	0	0	–	–	28	2
Budapest Honvéd	2016–17	Nemzeti Bajnokság I	22	3	3	0	—		—		25	3
Újpest	2017–18	Nemzeti Bajnokság I	27	2	4	1	—		—		31	3
Újpest	2018–19	Nemzeti Bajnokság I	32	4	3	1	—		4	2	39	7
Újpest	2019–20	Nemzeti Bajnokság I	27	3	4	0	—		—		31	3
Újpest	Total		86	9	11	2	–	–	4	2	101	13
Budapest Honvéd	2020–21	Nemzeti Bajnokság I	27	2	3	0	—		2	0	32	2
Budapest Honvéd	2021–22	Nemzeti Bajnokság I	32	5	2	0	—		—		34	5
Budapest Honvéd	Total		59	7	5	0	–	–	2	0	66	7
Career total			221	24	23	2	15	0	6	2	265	28
