= Bence Batik =

Hungarian football player

Personal information
- Date of birth: 8 November 1993 (age 33)
- Place of birth: Szeged, Hungary
- Height: 1.91 m (6 ft 3 in)
- Position: Midfielder

Team information
- Current team: Debrecen
- Number: 5

Youth career
- 2004–2007: Tisza Volán
- 2007–2010: Szombathely

Senior career*
Years	Team	Apps	(Gls)
2009–2010	Szombathely	0	(0)
2009–2010	→ Hódmezővásárhely (loan)	11	(2)
2010–2011	Hódmezővásárhely	23	(2)
2011–2012	Szeged	9	(3)
2012–2018	Ferencváros	21	(0)
2013–2014	→ MTK (loan)	15	(1)
2018–2022	Budapest Honvéd	111	(7)
2022–2024	Puskás Akadémia	47	(4)
2024–	Debrecen	27	(1)

International career
2011	Hungary U-19	1	(0)
- * Club domestic league appearances and goals as of 30 May 2026

Bence Batik (born 8 November 1993, in Szeged) is a Hungarian football player. He plays for Debreceni VSC in the Hungarian NB I.

== Career ==
=== Ferencváros ===
He played his first league match in 2012. On 2 April 2016, Batik became Hungarian League champion with Ferencváros after losing to Debrecen 2–1 at the Nagyerdei Stadion in the 2015–16 Nemzeti Bajnokság I season.

=== Puskás Akadémia ===
On 5 August 2022, Batik signed with Puskás Akadémia.

== Club statistics ==
As of match played 15 May 2022

Club	Season	League			Cup		League Cup		Europe		Total	
Club	Season	Division	Apps	Goals	Apps	Goals	Apps	Goals	Apps	Goals	Apps	Goals
Hódmezővásárhely	2009–10	Nemzeti Bajnokság III	11	2	0	0	—		—		11	2
Hódmezővásárhely	2010–11	Nemzeti Bajnokság III	23	2	2	0	—		—		25	2
Hódmezővásárhely	Total		34	4	2	0	0	0	0	0	36	4
Szeged	2011–12	Nemzeti Bajnokság II	9	3	2	0	—		—		11	3
Ferencváros	2011–12	Nemzeti Bajnokság I	1	0	0	0	—		—		1	0
Ferencváros	2012–13	Nemzeti Bajnokság I	0	0	0	0	3	0	—		3	0
Ferencváros	2013–14	Nemzeti Bajnokság I	0	0	0	0	0	0	—		0	0
Ferencváros	2014–15	Nemzeti Bajnokság I	7	0	6	1	12	0	1	0	26	1
Ferencváros	2015–16	Nemzeti Bajnokság I	0	0	0	0	0	0	—		0	0
Ferencváros	2016–17	Nemzeti Bajnokság I	0	0	1	0	—		0	0	1	0
Ferencváros	2017–18	Nemzeti Bajnokság I	13	0	1	0	—		2	0	16	0
Ferencváros	Total		21	0	8	1	15	0	3	0	47	1
MTK Budapest (loan)	2013–14	Nemzeti Bajnokság I	15	1	4	0	0	0	—		19	1
Budapest Honvéd	2018–19	Nemzeti Bajnokság I	28	1	5	0	—		4	0	37	1
Budapest Honvéd	2019–20	Nemzeti Bajnokság I	30	1	8	2	—		4	0	42	3
Budapest Honvéd	2020–21	Nemzeti Bajnokság I	25	2	3	0	—		2	0	30	2
Budapest Honvéd	2021–22	Nemzeti Bajnokság I	28	3	4	1	—		—		32	4
Budapest Honvéd	Total		111	7	20	3	—		10	0	141	10
Career total			190	15	36	4	15	0	13	0	254	19

== Honours ==
Ferencváros

- Hungarian Cup: 2014–15, 2016–17
- Hungarian League Cup: 2012–13, 2014–15
- Szuperkupa: 2015

Honvéd

- Hungarian Cup: 2019-20
