= Gergő Irimiás =

Hungarian footballer (born 2001)

Personal information
- Full name: Irimiás Gergő István
- Date of birth: 8 September 2001 (age 25)
- Position: Midfielder

Team information
- Current team: USV Pöllauberg
- Number: 4

Youth career
- 2008–2014: Békéscsaba
- 2014–2020: Budapest Honvéd

Senior career*
Years	Team	Apps	(Gls)
2019–2022	Budapest Honvéd	4	(0)
2019–2022	→ Budapest Honvéd II	51	(7)
2020	→ Ajka (loan)	17	(1)
2022–2023	Dunaújváros	13	(0)
2024–2025	ACS Târgu Mureş		
2025–	USV Pöllauberg	8	(2)

International career^{‡}
2017	Hungary U16	5	(0)
2017–2018	Hungary U17	13	(1)
- * Club domestic league appearances and goals as of 18:25, 30 Oct 2025 (UTC) ‡ National team caps and goals as of 12:44, 13 June 2020 (UTC)

Irimiás Gergő István (born 8 September 2001) is a Hungarian footballer who currently plays as a midfielder for USV Pöllauberg.

== Career statistics ==
=== Club ===
As of 15 May 2022

Appearances and goals by club, season and competition
Club	Season	League			Cup		Continental		Other		Total	
Club	Season	Division	Apps	Goals	Apps	Goals	Apps	Goals	Apps	Goals	Apps	Goals
Budapest Honvéd II	2018–19	Nemzeti Bajnokság III	2	0	—		—		—		2	0
Budapest Honvéd II	2019–20	Nemzeti Bajnokság III	17	5	—		—		—		17	5
Budapest Honvéd II	2020–21	Nemzeti Bajnokság III	10	1	—		—		—		10	1
Budapest Honvéd II	2021–22	Nemzeti Bajnokság III	22	1	—		—		—		22	1
Budapest Honvéd II	Total		51	7	0	0	0	0	0	0	51	7
Ajka	2020–21	Nemzeti Bajnokság II	17	1	2	0	—		—		19	1
Ajka	Total		17	1	2	0	0	0	0	0	19	1
Budapest Honvéd	2019–20	Nemzeti Bajnokság I	4	0	0	0	0	0	—		4	0
Budapest Honvéd	Total		4	0	0	0	0	0	0	0	4	0
Career total			72	8	2	0	0	0	0	0	74	8
