= Nir Bardea =

Israeli footballer

Personal information
- Full name: Nir Ofekk Bardea
- Date of birth: 25 January 1996 (age 30)
- Place of birth: Rishon LeZion, Israel
- Height: 1.89 m (6 ft 2 in)
- Position: Center-back

Team information
- Current team: Hapoel Ramat Gan
- Number: 96

Youth career
- 2005–2006: Hapoel Rishon LeZion
- 2006–2012: Maccabi Haifa
- 2012–2013: Maccabi Petah Tikva
- 2013–2014: Hapoel Ramat Gan
- 2014–2015: Ashdod

Senior career*
Years	Team	Apps	(Gls)
2014	Hapoel Ramat Gan	1	(0)
2015–2021	Ashdod	95	(4)
2021–2022	Budapest Honvéd	6	(0)
2022–2023	Maccabi Bnei Reineh	26	(0)
2023–2024	Sabail	27	(2)
2024	Sepsi OSK	4	(0)
2025	Hapoel Hadera	9	(0)
2025–	Hapoel Ramat Gan	36	(4)

International career
2017–2018	Israel U21	4	(0)
- * Club domestic league appearances and goals as of 24 June 2026

Nir Ofek Bardea (Hebrew: ניר ברדע; born 25 January 1996) is an Israeli professional footballer who plays as a center-back for Hapoel Ramat Gan.

== Career ==
On 8 July 2022 signed for Maccabi Bnei Reineh.

== Honours ==
Ashdod

- Liga Leumit: 2015–16
- Toto Cup Leumit runner-up: 2015–16
