= 2023–24 Diósgyőri VTK season =

Diósgyőr
2023–24 season
- Manager: Serhiy Kuznetsov (until 31 January); Miklós Simon (interim, from 31 January to 14 February); Vladimir Radenković (from 14 February)
- Stadium: Diósgyőri Stadion
- Nemzeti Bajnokság I: 7th
- Magyar Kupa: Quarter-finals
- Top goalscorer: League: Bright Edomwonyi (8); All: Bright Edomwonyi (10)
- Highest home attendance: 12,178 v Ferencváros (22 October 2023, Nemzeti Bajnokság I)
- Lowest home attendance: 3,412 v MTK (16 December 2023, Nemzeti Bajnokság I)
- Average home league attendance: 6,432
- Biggest win: 6–2 v III. Kerület (Away, 17 September 2023, Magyar Kupa); 4–0 v Fehérvár (Home, 24 February 2024, Nemzeti Bajnokság I)
- Biggest defeat: 0–7 v Újpest (Away, 4 May 2024, Nemzeti Bajnokság I)
Home colours	Away colours	Third colours

The 2023–24 season was Diósgyőri Vasgyárak Testgyakorló Köre's 58th competitive season, 111th year in existence as a football club and first season in the Nemzeti Bajnokság I after winning the second division in the previous season. In addition to the domestic league, Diósgyőr participated in that season's editions of the Magyar Kupa.

After gaining promotion last season, Serhiy Kuznetsov was sacked by Diósgyőr on 31 January 2024. Miklós Simon, the professional director of the Diósgyőr Football Academy was appointed as interim manager. On 14 February 2024, Vladimir Radenković was appointed as Kuznetsov's permanent successor, who worked at the club nine years ago as the assistant coach to Tomislav Sivić.

== Squad ==
Squad at end of season

Note: Flags indicate national team as defined under FIFA eligibility rules; some limited exceptions apply. Players may hold more than one non-FIFA nationality.

No.	Pos.	Nation	Player
2	DF	DEN	Marco Lund
3	DF	HUN	Csaba Szatmári
4	DF	HUN	Szilárd Bokros
5	DF	BUL	Bozhidar Chorbadzhiyski
6	DF	HUN	Bence Bárdos
7	DF	HUN	István Csirmaz
9	FW	GRE	Argyris Kampetsis
10	FW	HUN	Levente Szabó
11	FW	HUN	Gábor Jurek
12	GK	UKR	Artem Odyntsov
15	DF	NGA	Godfrey Bitok
16	DF	HUN	Bence Komlósi
17	FW	NED	Elton Acolatse
20	MF	HUN	Ágoston Bényei
21	MF	BLR	Vladislav Klimovich
22	GK	HUN	Bogdán Bánhegyi

No.	Pos.	Nation	Player
25	MF	HUN	Gergő Holdampf
28	FW	BRA	Pernambuco
29	FW	ARG	Franchu
32	GK	HUN	Balázs Tóth
33	DF	HUN	Dániel Gera
34	FW	NGA	Bright Edomwonyi
37	DF	CZE	Ondřej Bačo
44	GK	SRB	Branislav Danilović
50	MF	ESP	Álex Vallejo
59	MF	ROU	Doru Popadiuc
66	MF	HUN	Bálint Ferencsik
72	DF	SRB	Daniel Farkaš
74	MF	HUN	Ádám Szamosi
87	FW	HUN	Vince Fekete
88	DF	HUN	Milán Demeter
94	FW	SVN	Rudi Požeg Vancaš

== Transfers ==
=== Transfers in ===
Transfer window	Pos.	No.	Player	From
Summer	DF	2	(France) Julien Célestine	(Mexico) León
Summer	DF	5	(Bulgaria) Bozhidar Chorbadzhiyski	(Poland) Widzew Łódź
Summer	FW	9	(Greece) Argyris Kampetsis	(Greece) Panathinaikos
Summer	GK	12	(Ukraine) Artem Odyntsov	Kisvárda
Summer	DF	15	(Nigeria) Godfrey Bitok	Free agent (Note: Previous club Volga Ulyanovsk.)
Summer	FW	17	(Netherlands) Elton Acolatse	(Israel) F.C. Ashdod
Summer	MF	21	(Belarus) Vladislav Klimovich	(Cyprus) Nea Salamis Famagusta
Summer	FW	34	(Nigeria) Bright Edomwonyi	(Slovenia) Koper
Summer	MF	50	(Spain) Álex Vallejo	Free agent (Note: Previous club Stal Mielec.)
Summer	FW	94	(Slovenia) Rudi Požeg Vancaš	(Slovenia) Koper
Summer	FW	99	(Bosnia and Herzegovina) Marin Jurina	(Saudi Arabia) Al Faisaly
Winter	DF	2	(Denmark) Marco Lund	(Sweden) IFK Norrköping
Winter	DF	16	(Hungary) Bence Komlósi	(Italy) Parma
Winter	GK	22	(Hungary) Bogdán Bánhegyi	Youth team
Winter	GK	32	(Hungary) Balázs Tóth	Kazincbarcika
Winter	DF	34	(Czech Republic) Ondřej Bačo	(Israel) Hapoel Jerusalem
Winter	MF	59	(Romania) Doru Popadiuc	(Romania) Universitatea Cluj

=== Transfers out ===
Transfer window	Pos.	No.	Player	To
Summer	FW	9	(Hungary) Márton Eppel	Released (Note: Joined Warta Poznań.)
Summer	MF	12	(Hungary) Vladimir Koman	Released
Summer	MF	17	(Hungary) Adrián Szőke	Released
Summer	DF	26	(Hungary) Kornél Szűcs	Kecskemét
Summer	MF	27	(Hungary) Botond Vajda	Debrecen
Summer	FW	28	(Hungary) Marcell Hornyák	Pécs
Summer	FW	42	(Hungary) Norbert Könyves	Released (Note: Joined Paks.)
Summer	GK	55	(Hungary) Zsombor Senkó	Zalaegerszeg
Summer	MF	66	(Hungary) Bálint Illés	Mezőkövesd
Winter	FW	10	(Hungary) Dániel Lukács	Kecskemét
Winter	FW	99	(Bosnia and Herzegovina) Marin Jurina	MTK

=== Loans in ===
Transfer window	Pos.	No.	Player	From	End date
Summer	GK	30	(Croatia) Karlo Sentić	(Croatia) Hajduk Split	Middle of season
Winter	FW	10	(Hungary) Levente Szabó	Fehérvár	End of season

=== Loans out ===
Transfer window	Pos.	No.	Player	To	End date
Winter	FW	70	(Gabon) Jérémie Moussango	(Slovakia) Košice	End of season

== Competitions ==
=== Overview ===
Competition	First match	Last match	Starting round	Final position	Record							
Competition	First match	Last match	Starting round	Final position	Pld	W	D	L	GF	GA	GD	Win %
Nemzeti Bajnokság I	29 July 2023	18 May 2024	Matchday 1	7th	33	12	9	12	50	56	−6	36.36
Magyar Kupa	17 September 2023	3 April 2024	Round of 64	Quarter-finals	4	3	0	1	13	7	+6	75.00
Total					37	15	9	13	63	63	+0	40.54

Source: Competitions

=== Nemzeti Bajnokság I ===
==== League table ====
Pos	Team	Pld	W	D	L	GF	GA	GD	Pts
5	Debrecen	33	14	6	13	49	48	+1	48
6	Kecskemét	33	13	6	14	45	45	0	45
7	Diósgyőr	33	12	9	12	50	56	−6	45
8	MTK	33	12	8	13	43	62	−19	44
9	Zalaegerszeg	33	12	7	14	54	60	−6	43

Source: Hungarian Football Federation (in Hungarian), Soccerway
Rules for classification: 1) Points; 2) Matches won; 3) Goal difference; 4) Goals scored; 5) Head-to-head points; 6) Head-to-head goal difference; 7) Fair play ranking; 8) Drawing of lots.

==== Results summary ====
Overall								Home						Away					
Pld	W	D	L	GF	GA	GD	Pts	W	D	L	GF	GA	GD	W	D	L	GF	GA	GD
33	12	9	12	50	56	−6	45	8	5	4	31	20	+11	4	4	8	19	36	−17

Source: Hungarian Football Federation

==== Results by round ====
Round	1	2	3	4	5	6	7	8	9	10	11	12	13	14	15	16	17	18	19	20	21	22	23	24	25	26	27	28	29	30	31	32	33
Ground	H	A	H	A	H	A	H	H	A	H	A	A	H	A	H	A	H	A	A	H	A	H	H	A	H	A	H	A	H	H	A	H	A
Result	L	W	D	W	W	L	W	W	L	L	L	D	W	L	L	W	D	D	L	L	L	W	D	W	W	L	D	D	W	D	L	W	D
Position	9	5	7	5	2	7	4	3	4	5	6	7	6	7	8	7	7	7	8	8	8	8	8	7	6	7	7	7	7	7	8	6	7
Points	0	3	4	7	10	10	13	16	16	16	16	17	20	20	20	23	24	25	25	25	25	28	29	32	35	35	36	37	40	41	41	44	45

Source: Matches
A = Away; H = Home; W = Win; D = Draw; L = Loss

==== Matches ====
29 July 2023 1	Diósgyőr	0–1	Puskás Akadémia	Miskolc
18:00 CEST (UTC+2)	Edomwonyi (yellow card) 88'; Vallejo (yellow card) 88'; Gera (yellow card) 90+1'	Report	Corbu (yellow card) 1'; Slagveer 10'; Szolnoki (yellow card) 58'; Maceiras (yellow card) 83'; Golla (yellow card) 90+5'	Stadium: Diósgyőri Stadion; Attendance: 7,579; Referee: Balázs Berke

5 August 2023 2	Mezőkövesd	2–4	Diósgyőr	Mezőkövesd
17:45 CEST (UTC+2)	Vayda (yellow card) 42'; Dražić 48', 76'; Pillár (yellow card) 49'; Beriashvili (yellow card) 58'; Kállai (red card) 78'; Hudák (yellow card) 84'; Lukić (yellow card) 90+3'; Kojnok (yellow card) 90+7'	Report	Bárdos 4'; Požeg Vancaš 35'; Lukács 68'; Edomwonyi 88'; Vallejo (yellow card) 90+3'	Stadium: Városi Stadion; Attendance: 3,915; Referee: István Vad

12 August 2023 3	Diósgyőr	1–1	Paks	Miskolc
20:15 CEST (UTC+2)	Edomwonyi 15'; Holdampf (yellow card) 90+6'	Report	Könyves 29'; Temesvári (red card) 86'	Stadium: Diósgyőri Stadion; Attendance: 6,649; Referee: Tamás Bognár

18 August 2023 4	Zalaegerszeg	1–3	Diósgyőr	Zalaegerszeg
20:15 CEST (UTC+2)	Gergényi (yellow card) 40'; Tajti (yellow card) 61'; Szendrei 86'	Report	Stephen 26'; Edomwonyi (yellow card) 61'; Lukács 71'; Pernambuco 89'	Stadium: ZTE Arena; Attendance: 2,792; Referee: Csaba Pintér

26 August 2023 5	Diósgyőr	2–0	Kisvárda	Miskolc
17:45 CEST (UTC+2)	Bitok (yellow card) 18'; Gera 38'; Edomwonyi 45+1'	Report		Stadium: Diósgyőri Stadion; Attendance: 6,651; Referee: István Vad

2 September 2023 6	MTK	2–1	Diósgyőr	Budapest
15:15 CEST (UTC+2)	Kata 5'; Hey (yellow card) 38'; Bognár 57'; Zsóri (yellow card) 90+4'	Report	Bárdos (yellow card) 21'; Vallejo 60'	Stadium: Hidegkuti Nándor Stadion; Attendance: 3,679; Referee: Péter Antal

23 September 2023 7	Diósgyőr	3–1	Debrecen	Miskolc
17:00 CEST (UTC+2)	Holdampf 31'; Pernambuco 45+2'; Szatmári (yellow card) 49'; Gera (yellow card) 53'; Jurina (yellow card) 88'; Acolatse 90+2'	Report	Bárány 64'	Stadium: Diósgyőri Stadion; Attendance: 9,518; Referee: Balázs Berke

1 October 2023 8	Diósgyőr	3–1	Kecskemét	Miskolc
17:30 CEST (UTC+2)	Požeg Vancaš 10' (pen.); Gera 18'; Jurina 70'	Report	Zeke (yellow card) 8'; Belényesi (yellow card) 37'; Szalai (yellow card) 51'; Horváth 86' (pen.)	Stadium: Diósgyőri Stadion; Attendance: 7,292; Referee: Mihály Káprály

7 October 2023 9	Újpest	2–0	Diósgyőr	Budapest
16:15 CEST (UTC+2)	Onovo 51'; Ambrose 66'; Banai (yellow card) 80'; Pauljević (yellow card) 82'	Report	Gera (yellow card) 62'	Stadium: Szusza Ferenc Stadion; Attendance: 7,188; Referee: Ferenc Karakó

22 October 2023 10	Diósgyőr	1–2	Ferencváros	Miskolc
17:45 CEST (UTC+2)	Pernambuco (yellow card) 52'; Požeg Vancaš 69' (pen.)	Report	Botka 14', (yellow card) 90+7'; B. Varga (yellow card) 28'; Abu Fani (yellow card) 45+2'; Pešić 61'; Wingo (yellow card) 68'; Marquinhos (yellow card) 75'	Stadium: Diósgyőri Stadion; Attendance: 12,178; Referee: Gergő Bogár

28 October 2023 11	Fehérvár	4–0	Diósgyőr	Székesfehérvár
14:45 CEST (UTC+2)	Schön (yellow card) 32'; B. Tóth (yellow card) 33'; Christensen 41'; Kodro 45+1', 83'; Kastrati 82'	Report	Gera (yellow card) 16'; Acolatse (yellow card) 60'; Farkaš (red card) 69'; Kampetsis (yellow card) 71'; Szatmári (red card) 86'	Stadium: Sóstói Stadion; Attendance: 3,096; Referee: Tamás Bognár

4 November 2023 12	Puskás Akadémia	0–0	Diósgyőr	Felcsút
15:45 CET (UTC+1)	Nagy (yellow card) 15'; Golla (yellow card) 44'	Report	Vallejo (yellow card) 61'; Chorbadzhiyski (yellow card) 83'	Stadium: Pancho Aréna; Attendance: 1,680; Referee: Marcell Derdák

11 November 2023 13	Diósgyőr	2–0	Mezőkövesd	Miskolc
14:15 CET (UTC+1)	Gera (yellow card) 33'; Edomwonyi 40'; Vallejo 81'	Report	Kállai (yellow card) 78'	Stadium: Diósgyőri Stadion; Attendance: 6,821; Referee: Péter Zierkelbach

24 November 2023 14	Paks	4–1	Diósgyőr	Paks
20:00 CET (UTC+1)	Könyves 10'; Mezei 21'; J. Szabó 27'; Szélpál (yellow card) 73'; Hahn 80'	Report	Szatmári (yellow card) 48'; Požeg Vancaš 54' (pen.); Vallejo (yellow card) 57'	Stadium: Fehérvári úti Stadion; Attendance: 1,712; Referee: Csaba Pintér

3 December 2023 15	Diósgyőr	0–3	Zalaegerszeg	Miskolc
15:15 CET (UTC+1)	Stephen (yellow card) 87'	Report	Németh (yellow card) 2'; Medgyes (yellow card) 22'; Mim 65', 74', (yellow card) 74'; Ubochioma 90+3'	Stadium: Diósgyőri Stadion; Attendance: 3,652; Referee: István Vad

10 December 2023 16	Kisvárda	1–2	Diósgyőr	Kisvárda
13:00 CET (UTC+1)	Jovičić (yellow card) 84'; Camaj (yellow card) 90', (goal) 90+4'	Report	Požeg Vancaš 41' (pen.); Vallejo (yellow card) 57'; Kampetsis (yellow card) 80'; Acolatse 85'; Gera (yellow card) 90'	Stadium: Várkerti Stadion; Attendance: 1,841; Referee: Dr Bence Csonka

16 December 2023 17	Diósgyőr	3–3	MTK	Miskolc
17:30 CET (UTC+1)	Edomwonyi (yellow card) 28'; Chorbadzhiyski (yellow card) 31'; Szatmári 33', (yellow card) 84'; Holdampf (yellow card) 47'; Hey 77' (o.g.); Franchu 79'	Report	Stieber 19'; Kocsis (yellow card) 28'; Varju (yellow card) 42'; Antonov 64'; Végh 82'	Stadium: Diósgyőri Stadion; Attendance: 3,412; Referee: Csaba Pintér

3 February 2024 18	Debrecen	2–2	Diósgyőr	Debrecen
17:30 CET (UTC+1)	Dzsudzsák 62'; Romanchuk (yellow card) 70'; Úlfarsson (yellow card) 78'; Kusnyír 89'	Report	Bényei 50'; Jurek 57'; Szatmári (red card) 77'	Stadium: Nagyerdei Stadion; Attendance: 5,841; Referee: Gergő Bogár

8 February 2024 19	Kecskemét	2–1	Diósgyőr	Kecskemét
20:00 CET (UTC+1)	Horváth 17', 71'; Lukács (yellow card) 58'; Katona (yellow card) 82'	Report	Popadiuc (yellow card) 10'; Požeg Vancaš 59'	Stadium: Széktói Stadion; Attendance: 2,127; Referee: Dr Bence Csonka

11 February 2024 20	Diósgyőr	1–2	Újpest	Miskolc
14:45 CET (UTC+1)	Jurek (yellow card) 44'; Edomwonyi 50'; Kampetsis (yellow card) 90+1'	Report	Radošević 17'; Mörschel (yellow card) 53', (goal) 73'; Pauljević (yellow card) 77'	Stadium: Diósgyőri Stadion; Attendance: 7,581; Referee: Péter Antal

24 February 2024 22	Diósgyőr	4–0	Fehérvár	Miskolc
15:00 CET (UTC+1)	Bényei (yellow card) 3'; Gergényi 19' (o.g.); Jurek (yellow card) 37'; Feuillassier 70'; Szabó 87' (pen.), 89'	Report	Csongvai (red card) 18'; Serafimov (yellow card) 86'	Stadium: Diósgyőri Stadion; Attendance: 5,164; Referee: Csaba Pintér

2 March 2024 23	Diósgyőr	1–1	Puskás Akadémia	Miskolc
18:45 CET (UTC+1)	Bitok (yellow card) 26'; Edomwonyi 49'; Jurek (yellow card) 56'	Report	Szolnoki (yellow card) 18'; Favorov (yellow card) 23'; Plšek 45'; Colley (yellow card) 70'	Stadium: Diósgyőri Stadion; Attendance: 4,805; Referee: Balázs Berke

9 March 2024 24	Mezőkövesd	1–2	Diósgyőr	Mezőkövesd
12:45 CET (UTC+1)	Kojnok (yellow card) 31'; Dražić 45'; Szolgai (yellow card) 56'; Szilágyi (red card) 77'	Report	Szatmári 16'; Požeg Vancaš (yellow card) 41'; Gera (yellow card) 50'; Bényei 71'	Stadium: Városi Stadion; Attendance: 3,850; Referee: Péter Antal

16 March 2024 25	Diósgyőr	2–1	Paks	Miskolc
15:30 CET (UTC+1)	Jurek 19'; Klimovich 72'	Report	Könyves 2'; Lenzsér (yellow card) 18'; Papp (yellow card) 54'; Vas (yellow card) 66'	Stadium: Diósgyőri Stadion; Attendance: 5,587; Referee: József Erdős

30 March 2024 26	Zalaegerszeg	5–1	Diósgyőr	Zalaegerszeg
19:30 CET (UTC+1)	Sajbán 26', 90+3'; Medgyes (yellow card) 31'; Sanković (yellow card) 31'; Mance 36' (pen.); Croizet 62'; Lund 81' (o.g.)	Report	Pernambuco 60'; Vallejo (yellow card) 67'; Bitok (yellow card) 70'; Popadiuc (yellow card) 80'	Stadium: ZTE Arena; Attendance: 3,310; Referee: Tamás Bognár

6 April 2024 27	Diósgyőr	1–1	Kisvárda	Miskolc
16:30 CEST (UTC+2)	Gera 36'; Odyntsov (yellow card) 90+2'	Report	Filipović (yellow card) 33'; Cipetić 66' (pen.); Nikolov (yellow card) 90+2'	Stadium: Diósgyőri Stadion; Attendance: 4,398; Referee: Dr Bence Csonka

10 April 2024 21	Ferencváros	2–1	Diósgyőr	Budapest
18:00 CEST (UTC+2)	B. Varga 1'; Abu Fani (yellow card) 19'; Sevikyan 22'; Botka (yellow card) 63'; Abena (yellow card) 74'	Report	Bényei (yellow card) 27'; Szatmári (yellow card) 35'; Požeg Vancaš 56', (yellow card) 74'; Chorbadzhiyski (yellow card) 90+4'	Stadium: Groupama Aréna; Attendance: 9,473; Referee: Balázs Berke
Note: The match was postponed due to Ferencváros's participation in European competition.

14 April 2024 28	MTK	1–1	Diósgyőr	Budapest
14:00 CEST (UTC+2)	Bognár 31'; Kocsis (yellow card) 43'; P. Kovács I (yellow card) 47'	Report	Franchu (yellow card) 74'; Pernambuco 85'	Stadium: Hidegkuti Nándor Stadion; Attendance: 3,739; Referee: István Vad

20 April 2024 29	Diósgyőr	5–3	Debrecen	Miskolc
19:30 CEST (UTC+2)	Klimovich 1'; Edomwonyi 22', 60'; Gera 67'; Fekete 90+4'	Report	Ferenczi (yellow card) 29'; Baranyai 42'; Bárány 48'; Dzsudzsák (yellow card) 64'; Ojediran 83'	Stadium: Diósgyőri Stadion; Attendance: 6,005; Referee: Gergő Bogár

27 April 2024 30	Diósgyőr	0–0	Kecskemét	Miskolc
17:00 CEST (UTC+2)	Bitok (yellow card) 49'; Požeg Vancaš (yellow card) 90+2'	Report	Helmich (yellow card) 40'; Szűcs (yellow card) 70'; Májer (yellow card) 80'	Stadium: Diósgyőri Stadion; Attendance: 5,412; Referee: Ferenc Karakó

4 May 2024 31	Újpest	7–0	Diósgyőr	Budapest
19:15 CEST (UTC+2)	Radošević 6'; Keita 10'; Mörschel 30' (pen.); Ljujić 45'; Csoboth 59', 61'; Ambrose 72'	Report	Lund (yellow card) 33'; Bokros (yellow card) 48'	Stadium: Szusza Ferenc Stadion; Attendance: 5,833; Referee: Mihály Káprály

11 May 2024 32	Diósgyőr	2–0	Ferencváros	Miskolc
19:30 CEST (UTC+2)	Gera (yellow card) 17', (goal) 76'; Lund (yellow card) 58'; Szabó 88'	Report	Tóth (yellow card) 48'	Stadium: Diósgyőri Stadion; Attendance: 6,634; Referee: Sándor Andó-Szabó

18 May 2024 33	Fehérvár	0–0	Diósgyőr	Székesfehérvár
17:45 CEST (UTC+2)	Gergényi (yellow card) 56'; Spandler (yellow card) 77'	Report	Klimovich (yellow card) 11'; Lund (yellow card) 48'; Gera (yellow card) 49'; Szabó (yellow card) 53'; Jurek (yellow card) 62'; Chorbadzhiyski (yellow card) 70'	Stadium: Sóstói Stadion; Attendance: 6,133; Referee: Ferenc Karakó

=== Magyar Kupa ===
17 September 2023 Round of 64	III. Kerület	2–6	Diósgyőr	Budapest (Note: The match was played at the Szőnyi úti Stadion in Budapest, instead of III. Kerület regular stadium, the Hévízi úti Stadion in Budapest due to the renovation started on 10 August 2023.)
15:00 CEST (UTC+2)	Buda (yellow card) 10', (goal) 37'; Lapu (yellow card) 23'; Erdei (yellow card) 63'; Zámbó 84'	Report	Franchu 5'; Acolatse (yellow card) 14', (goal) 17'; Pernambuco 25'; Jurina 49'; Bényei (yellow card) 69'; Papp 77' (o.g.); Lukács 88'	Stadium: Szőnyi úti Stadion; Attendance: 1,000; Referee: Marcell Derdák

1 November 2023 Round of 32	Siófok	1–3	Diósgyőr	Siófok
17:00 CET (UTC+1)	Schildkraut 51'	Report	Klimovich 11'; Edomwonyi 45'; Moussango (yellow card) 75'; Bényei 88'	Stadium: Révész Géza utcai Stadion; Attendance: 600; Referee: Marcell Derdák

27 February 2024 Round of 16	Diósgyőr	4–2	Zalaegerszeg	Miskolc
17:30 CET (UTC+1)	Gera 7'; Požeg Vancaš 13'; Szabó 45+2'; Edomwonyi 76'; Lund (yellow card) 82'; Bitok (yellow card) 90+5'	Report	Sajbán 54'; Szendrei (yellow card) 75'; Croizet 83' (pen.); Csóka (yellow card) 90+2'; Várkonyi (yellow card) 90+5'	Stadium: Diósgyőri Stadion; Attendance: 3,456; Referee: Péter Zierkelbach

3 April 2024 Quarter-finals	Diósgyőr	0–2	Ferencváros	Miskolc
20:00 CEST (UTC+2)	Holdampf (yellow card) 45'; Vallejo (yellow card) 46'; Gera (yellow card) 65'	Report	Zachariassen 37'; Abu Fani (yellow card) 45'; Lund 46' (o.g.); Marquinhos (yellow card) 84'	Stadium: Diósgyőri Stadion; Attendance: 11,114; Referee: Sándor Andó-Szabó

== Statistics ==
=== Overall ===
Appearances (Apps) numbers are for appearances in competitive games only, including sub appearances.
Source: Competitions

No.	Player	Pos.	Nemzeti Bajnokság I				Magyar Kupa				Total			
No.	Player	Pos.	Apps	Goal	Booked	Sent off (straight red)	Apps	Goal	Booked	Sent off (straight red)	Apps	Goal	Booked	Sent off (straight red)
2	(France) Julien Célestine	DF												
2	(Denmark) Marco Lund	DF	14		3		2		1		16		4	
3	(Hungary) Csaba Szatmári	DF	28	2	4	2	3				31	2	4	2
4	(Hungary) Szilárd Bokros	DF	13		1		2				15		1	
5	(Bulgaria) Bozhidar Chorbadzhiyski	DF	15		4		2				17		4	
6	(Hungary) Bence Bárdos	DF	10	1	1		1				11	1	1	
7	(Hungary) István Csirmaz	DF	1								1			
8	(Hungary) Attila Lőrinczy	FW	1								1			
9	(Greece) Argyris Kampetsis	FW	17		3		3				20		3	
10	(Hungary) Dániel Lukács	FW	17	2			2	1			19	3		
10	(Hungary) Levente Szabó	FW	12	3	1		2	1			14	4	1	
11	(Hungary) Gábor Jurek	FW	23	2	4		3				26	2	4	
12	(Ukraine) Artem Odyntsov	GK	22		1		2				24		1	
14	(Hungary) Gergő Csatári	MF					1				1			
15	(Nigeria) Godfrey Bitok	DF	31	1	5		3		1		34	1	6	
16	(Hungary) Bence Komlósi	DF												
17	(Netherlands) Elton Acolatse	FW	24	2	1		3	1	1		27	3	2	
20	(Hungary) Ágoston Bényei	MF	25	2	2		4	1	1		29	3	3	
21	(Belarus) Vladislav Klimovich	MF	26	2	1		2	1			28	3	1	
22	(Hungary) Bogdán Bánhegyi	GK	1								1			
23	(Slovakia) Sinan Medgyes	DF												
25	(Hungary) Gergő Holdampf	MF	32	1	2		4		1		36	1	3	
28	(Brazil) Pernambuco	FW	28	4	1		4	1			32	5	1	
29	(Argentina) Franchu	FW	13	2	1		2	1			15	3	1	
30	(Croatia) Karlo Sentić	GK	9				1				10			
32	(Hungary) Balázs Tóth	GK												
33	(Hungary) Dániel Gera	DF	29	5	9		3	1	1		32	6	10	
34	(Nigeria) Bright Edomwonyi	FW	30	8	3		2	2			32	10	3	
37	(Czech Republic) Ondřej Bačo	DF	2				1				3			
44	(Serbia) Branislav Danilović	GK	2				1				3			
50	(Spain) Álex Vallejo	MF	29	2	6		4		1		33	2	7	
59	(Romania) Doru Popadiuc	MF	5		2		1				6		2	
66	(Hungary) Bálint Ferencsik	MF	2								2			
70	(Gabon) Jérémie Moussango	FW	7				1		1		8		1	
72	(Serbia) Daniel Farkaš	DF	7			1	1				8			1
74	(Hungary) Ádám Szamosi	MF												
87	(Hungary) Vince Fekete	FW	3	1							3	1		
88	(Hungary) Milán Demeter	DF												
94	(Slovenia) Rudi Požeg Vancaš	FW	30	7	3		4	1			34	8	3	
99	(Bosnia and Herzegovina) Marin Jurina	FW	7	1	1		1	1			8	2	1	
Own goals				2				1				3		
Totals				50	59	3		13	8			63	67	3

=== Clean sheets ===
			Clean sheets		
No.	Player	Games Played	Nemzeti Bajnokság I	Magyar Kupa	Total
12	(Ukraine) Artem Odyntsov	24	6	0	6
30	(Croatia) Karlo Sentić	10	1	0	1
44	(Serbia) Branislav Danilović	3	0	0	0
22	(Hungary) Bogdán Bánhegyi	1	0		0
32	(Hungary) Balázs Tóth	0			0
Totals			7	0	7
