= 2025–26 Diósgyőri VTK season =

Diósgyőr
2025–26 season
- Chairman: Gergely Sántha
- Manager: Nebojša Vignjević (From 6 March 2026); Vladimir Radenković (From 18 June 2025 until 6 March 2026)
- Stadium: Diósgyőri Stadion
- Nemzeti Bajnokság I: 11th ({Relegated to NB II)
- Magyar Kupa: Quarter-final
- Top goalscorer: League: Acolatse (8); All: Acolatse (8)
- Highest home attendance: 6,510 (v Ferencváros, Nemzeti Bajnokság, Round 18, 19 December 2025)
- Lowest home attendance: 104 (v Paks, Nemzeti Bajnokság, Round 33, 16 May 2026)
- Average home league attendance: 3,656
- Biggest win: 4 goals, (4–0) v MTK Budapest (H), Nemzeti Bajnokság, Round 14, 23 November 2025, (4–0) v Paks (A), Magyar Kupa, Round of 16, 11 February 2026
- Biggest defeat: 5 goals, (0–5) v MTK (A), Nemzeti Bajnokság, Round 3, 9 August 2025
- All statistics correct as of 16 May 2026.

The 2025–26 season is Diósgyőri VTK's 58th competitive season, 3rd consecutive season in the Nemzeti Bajnokság I and 125th year in existence as a football club. In addition to the domestic league, Diósgyőr participate in this season's editions of the Magyar Kupa.

Diósgyőr finished in Fizz Liga (domestic league) in 11th place and was relegated to the second division.

== Kits ==
Supplier: 2Rule / Sponsor: Tippmix / Hell Energy Drink / Shirt back sponsor: Apollo Tyres / Sleeve sponsor: Borsodi / Volkswagen-Miskolc Autó / Short sponsor: Duna Aszfalt / Borsodi / Tippmix

| Home | Home alt. | Away | Third |

| Goalkeeper^{1} | Goalkeeper^{2} | Goalkeeper^{3} |

== First team squad ==
As of 3 September 2025

Note: Flags indicate national team as defined under FIFA eligibility rules; some limited exceptions apply. Players may hold more than one non-FIFA nationality.

| No. | Pos. | Nation | Player |
|---|---|---|---|
| 1 | GK | HUN | Bogdán Bánhegyi |
| 3 | DF | HUN | Csaba Szatmári |
| 4 | DF | DEN | Marco Lund |
| 5 | DF | HUN | Ákos Kecskés |
| 6 | DF | HUN | Bence Bárdos |
| 7 | FW | NED | Elton Acolatse |
| 8 | FW | SRB | Ivan Šaponjić |
| 9 | FW | HUN | Máté Sajbán |
| 10 | FW | HUN | Gábor Jurek |
| 11 | DF | HUN | Dániel Gera (vice-captain) |
| 15 | MF | FRA | Yohan Croizet |
| 16 | MF | HUN | Bence Komlósi |
| 17 | MF | HUN | Máté Macsó |
| 19 | MF | CIV | Aboubakar Keita |
| 20 | MF | HUN | Ágoston Bényei |
| 21 | DF | HUN | Levente Babós (Loaned from Újpest) |

| No. | Pos. | Nation | Player |
|---|---|---|---|
| 22 | DF | HUN | Szilárd Bokros |
| 24 | MF | CRO | Ante Roguljić |
| 25 | MF | HUN | Gergő Holdampf (captain) |
| 29 | DF | HUN | Benjámin Bacsa |
| 30 | GK | CRO | Karlo Sentić |
| 31 | GK | HUN | Gábor Megyeri |
| 44 | MF | NGR | Anderson Esiti |
| 47 | FW | HUN | Márk Mucsányi |
| 50 | MF | ESP | Álex Vallejo (vice-captain) |
| 70 | DF | HUN | Milán Demeter |
| 74 | FW | HUN | Bence Babos (Loaned from Videoton) |
| 75 | GK | HUN | Benedek Lipóczi |
| 85 | DF | HUN | Bence Szakos |
| 88 | MF | HUN | Miron Mucsányi (Loaned from Újpest) |
| 93 | DF | HUN | Márk Tamás |
| 94 | FW | SLO | Rudi Požeg Vancaš |

== Transfers ==
=== Summer ===
In
| Date | No. | Pos. | Nat. | Player | Moving from | Fee | Ref. |
|---|---|---|---|---|---|---|---|
| 25 June 2025 | 8 | FW | Serbia | Ivan Šaponjić | Fehérvár | Undisclosed | |
| 8 July 2025 | 5 | DF | Hungary | Ákos Kecskés | AEL Limassol | Undisclosed | |
| 11 July 2025 | 24 | MF | Croatia | Ante Roguljić | Anorthosis Famagusta | Undisclosed | |
| 31 July 2025 | 93 | DF | Hungary | Márk Tamás | Sepsi | Undisclosed | |
| 3 September 2025 | 15 | MF | France | Yohan Croizet | Zalaegerszeg | Undisclosed | |
| 3 September 2025 | 19 | MF | Ivory Coast | Aboubakar Keita | Nyíregyháza | Undisclosed | |

Loaned from
| Date | No. | Pos. | Nat. | Player | Moving from | Until | Ref. |
|---|---|---|---|---|---|---|---|
| 29 July 2025 | 74 | FW | Hungary | Bence Babos | Videoton (NB II) | 30 June 2026 | |
| 30 July 2025 | 21 | DF | Hungary | Levente Babós | Újpest | 30 June 2026 | |
| 30 July 2025 | 88 | MF | Hungary | Miron Mucsányi | Újpest | 30 June 2026 | |

Return from loan
| Date | No. | Pos. | Nat. | Player | Moving from | Ref. |
|---|---|---|---|---|---|---|
| 3 July 2025 | 22 | DF | Hungary | Szilárd Bokros | Košice | |

Out
| Date | No. | Pos. | Nat. | Player | Moving to | Fee | Ref. |
|---|---|---|---|---|---|---|---|
| 23 June 2025 | 70 | FW | Nigeria | Bright Edomwonyi | Nyíregyháza | Undisclosed | |
| 28 June 2025 | 34 | FW | Hungary | Alen Skribek | Zalaegerszeg | Undisclosed | |
| 30 June 2025 | 44 | GK | Serbia | Branislav Danilović | TBD | Contract expired | |
| 30 June 2025 | 12 | GK | Ukraine | Artem Odyntsov | Andijon | Contract expired | |
| 30 June 2025 | 5 | DF | Bulgaria | Bozhidar Chorbadzhiyski | TBD | Contract expired | |
| 30 June 2025 | 21 | DF | Belarus | Vladislav Klimovich | TBD | Contract expired | |
| 3 July 2025 | 66 | DF | Hungary | Bálint Ferencsik | TBD | Mutual agreement | |
| 17 July 2025 | 72 | DF | Hungary | Kevin Kállai | Bp. Honvéd (NB II) | Mutual agreement | |
| 17 July 2025 | | FW | Hungary | Zoltán Kállai | TBD | Mutual agreement | |
| 18 July 2025 | 87 | FW | Hungary | Vince Fekete | DEAC (NB III) | Mutual agreement | |
| 28 July 2025 | 14 | DF | Hungary | Gergő Csatári | Mezőkövesd (NB II) | Mutual agreement | |

Out on loan
| Date | No. | Pos. | Nat. | Player | Moving to | Loan date | Ref. |
|---|---|---|---|---|---|---|---|
| 30 June 2025 | | MF | Ivory Coast | Christ Tiéhi | Baník Ostrava (Czech I) | 30 June 2026 | |
| 30 June 2025 | | DF | Hungary | Márk Kristóf | Békéscsaba (NB II) | 30 June 2026 | |
| 30 June 2025 | | MF | Hungary | Ádám Szamosi | Budapest Honvéd (NB II) | 30 June 2026 | |
| 30 June 2025 | | | Hungary | Kristóf Lichy | Ajka (NB II) | 30 June 2026 | |
| 2 July 2025 | | DF | Hungary | Vencel Lajcsik | Budafok (NB II) | 30 June 2026 | |
| 25 July 2025 | | FW | Hungary | Szabolcs Sáreczki | Mezőkövesd (NB II) | 30 June 2026 | |
| 25 July 2025 | | MF | Ukraine | Nazar Kovalenko | Mezőkövesd (NB II) | 30 June 2026 | |
| 25 July 2025 | | FW | Ukraine | Bohdan Furdetskyi | Mezőkövesd (NB II) | 30 June 2026 | |

Returned to his club after his loan contract expired
| Date | No. | Pos. | Nat. | Player | Back to | Ref. |
|---|---|---|---|---|---|---|
| 30 June 2025 | 51 | GK | Hungary | Barnabás Simon | Paks | |
| 30 June 2025 | 26 | DF | Serbia | Uroš Drezgić | Rubin Kazan | |
| 30 June 2025 | 96 | FW | Hungary | Marcell Huszár | Győr | |
| 30 June 2025 | 7 | FW | Montenegro | Marko Rakonjac | Lokomotiv Moscow | |
| 30 June 2025 | 68 | DF | Hungary | Zétény Varga | Ferencváros | |

=== New contracts ===
| Date | No. | Pos. | Nat. | Player | Until | Ref. |
|---|---|---|---|---|---|---|
| 10 September 2025 | | GK | Hungary | Hunor Varga | Undisclosed | |

=== Managerial changes ===
| Outgoing manager | Manner of departure | Date of vacancy | Position in table | Incoming manager | Date of appointment | Ref. |
|---|---|---|---|---|---|---|
| Valdas Dambrauskas | Resign | 12 June 2025 | Pre-season | 18 June 2025 | Vladimir Radenković | |
| Vladimir Radenković | Sacked | 6 March 2026 | 11th | 6 March 2026 | Nebojša Vignjević | |

^{c} = Caretaker

== Friendlies ==
Win Draw Loss Fixtures

=== Pre-season ===
Diósgyőr started the preparation for the 2025/26 season at 20 June 2025.

| 2 July 2025 Friendly | Diósgyőr | 5–0 | Eger (NB III) | Miskolc |
| 10:00 CEST (UTC+02:00) | Acolatse 9', 33'; Demeter 38'; Bényei 45'; Csatári 62' | Report | Bánhegyi (yellow card) 78' | Stadium: DVTK Training Center; Attendance: 0 (Closed doors); Referee: Róbert Nagy; Assistant referees: Levente Balla, Dániel Gutyán |
Note: • DVTK 1st half: Sentić — D. Gera, Lund, Bárdos, Demeter — Bényei, Vallejo, Sajbán — Acolatse, Šaponjić, Požeg Vancaš • DVTK 2nd half: G. Megyeri — Szakos, B. Bacsa, Saničanin, Bokros — Holdampf, Komlósi, Macsó — Csatári, Fekete, Fekete • Manager: Radenković

| 6 July 2025 Friendly | Maccabi Haifa (Israeli I) (Israel) | 1–3 | Diósgyőr | Felcsút, Hungary |
| 18:00 CEST (UTC+02:00) | Saba 35' | Report | Šaponjić 11'; Acolatse 45'; D. Gera 64' | Stadium: Panco Aréna; Attendance: 0 (Closed doors); Referee: Tamás Takács; Assistant referees: Norbert Bornemissza, Péter Garai |
Note: • DVTK: Sentić — D. Gera (Szakos (substituted on) 69'), Lund, Bárdos (Saničanin (substituted on) 61'), Demeter (Bokros (substituted on) 61') — Bényei (Fekete (substituted on) 68'), Vallejo, Esiti — Acolatse (Csatári (substituted on) 73'), Šaponjić (Sajbán (substituted on) 46'), Požeg Vancaš (Macsó (substituted on) 72') • Manager: Radenković

Summer training camp in Hagenberg, Austria, from 7 July to 14 July 2025.

| 9 July 2025 Friendly | Slavia Praha (Czech II) (Czech Republic) | 2–0 | Diósgyőr | Bad Wimsbach, Austria |
| 15:30 CEST (UTC+02:00) | Chytil 77'; Tijani 88' |
Note: • DVTK: Megyeri (Sentić (substituted on) 56') – D. Gera, Bárdos, Saničanin, Bokros (Demeter (substituted on) 69') – Vallejo (Holdampf (substituted on) 84'), Esiti, Sajbán (Bényei (substituted on) 56') – Acolatse, Šaponjić (Jurek (substituted on) 73'), Požeg Vancaš (Mucsányi (substituted on) 56') • Manager: Radenković

| 11 July 2025 Friendly | SV Ried (Austrian II) (Austria) | 1–1 | Diósgyőr | Peuerbach, Austria |
| | Mutandwa 10'; Sollbauer (yellow card) 43' | Report | Jurek 18' (pen.); Fekete (yellow card) 41' | Stadium: Guntamatic Arena; Referee: Philipp Hubinger; Assistant referees: Robert Platzer, Florian Klaffenböck |
Note: • DVTK: Megyeri — Szakos, B. Bacsa, Kecskés, Demeter (Bokros (substituted on) 75') — Sajbán, Holdampf, Bényei (Komlósi (substituted on) 70') — Mucsányi (Macsó (substituted on) 75'), Fekete (Csatári (substituted on) 59'), Jurek (Osikov (substituted on) 58') • Manager: Radenković

| 13 July 2025 Friendly | Artis Brno (Czech II) (Czech Republic) | 2–0 | Diósgyőr | Ansfelden, Austria |
| | Dahman 26'; Besedin 71' | Report | Šaponjić (yellow card) 64' | Stadium: HAKA Arena; Referee: Aladin Midzic; Assistant referees: Kevin Dorfmayr, Peparim Dauti |
Note: • DVTK: Sentić — D. Gera, Bárdos (Kecskés (substituted on) 40'), Saničanin, Bokros (Demeter (substituted on) 85') — Vallejo (Mucsányi (substituted on) 83'), Esiti (Komlósi (substituted on) 69'), Macsó (Roguljić (substituted on) 46') — Acolatse (Bényei (substituted on) 68'), Šaponjić, Požeg Vancaš (Sajbán (substituted on) 68') • Manager: Radenković

| 19 July 2025 Friendly | Diósgyőr | 1–1 | (Slovakia) Košice (Slovak I) | Miskolc |
| 18:00 CEST (UTC+02:00) | Jurek 21' (pen.) | Report | Miljanić 73' | Stadium: Diósgyőri Stadion; Attendance: 1,442; Referee: Márió Zimmermann; Assistant referees: Punyi, Forgács |
Note: • DVTK: Sentić (G. Megyeri (substituted on) 68') — D. Gera (Szakos (substituted on) 68'), Kecskés, Saničanin, Demeter — Esiti (Holdampf (substituted on) 37'), Vallejo, Bényei (Roguljić (substituted on) 57' (substituted off) 89' (Komlósi (substituted on) 89')) — Acolatse (Mucsányi (substituted on) 68'), Šaponjić (Požeg Vancaš (substituted on) 68'), Jurek (Sajbán (substituted on) 57') • Manager: Radenković

=== Mid-season ===
Winter training camp in Sotogrande, Spain, from 4 January until 16 January 2026.

| 9 January 2026 Friendly | Genk (Belgian I) (Belgium) | 3–4 | Diósgyőr | Marbella, Spain |
| 11:30 | Oh Hyeon-gyu 26', 69'; Bangoura 70' | Report | Sajbán 23'; Babos 37', 44'; Manguelle 59' (o.g.) | Stadium: La Quinta Football Center; Referee: Pablo Morales Moren (Spain) |
Note: • Diósgyőr: Tuska (Sentić (substituted on) 46') — Demeter (Szlifka (substituted on) 86'), Szatmári, Vallejo, Tamás — Holdampf (M. Pető (substituted on) 81'), A. Keita (Croizet (substituted on) 62') — Babos (Jurek (substituted on) 46'), Bényei (Roguljić (substituted on) 46'), Sajbán (Má. Mucsányi (substituted on) 46') — Acolatse (Šaponjić (substituted on) 46') • Manager: Radenković

| 13 January 2026 Friendly | Bodø/Glimt (Norwegian I) (Norway) | 4–1 | Diósgyőr | San Pedro Alcántara, Spain |
| 13:00 | Bjørkan 21'; Bjørtuft (yellow card) 26'; Jørgensen 32'; Høgh 35', 44' | Report | Acolatse 2'; Szatmári (yellow card) 6' | Stadium: San Pedro Alcántara; Referee: Espen Eskås; Assistant referees: Jan Erik Engan, Isaak Bashevkin |
Note: • Diósgyőr: Sentić (G. Megyeri (substituted on) 63') — Szatmári, Tamás (Szlifka (substituted on) 81'), Vallejo, Bokros (Demeter (substituted on) 53') – Komlósi (Bényei (substituted on) 46') Holdampf (Roguljić (substituted on) 63'), A. Keita – Babos (Šaponjić (substituted on) 46'), Acolatse (Má. Mucsányi (substituted on) 63'), M. Pető (Sajbán (substituted on) 46') • Manager: Radenković

| 15 January 2026 Friendly | Wolfsberger (Austrian I) (Austria) | 0–2 | Diósgyőr | Sotogrande, Spain |
| 15:00 | | Report | Šaponjić 17'; Macsó 90+2' | Stadium: Santa Maria Polo Club; Referee: Rafael Gavilán García; Assistant referees: Cristian José Boix Figueredo, Alfonso Romero Terrón |
Note: • Diósgyőr: G. Megyeri (Tuska (substituted on) 60') — Kastrati (Szakos (substituted on) 60'), Bárdos (Holdampf (substituted on) 60'), Bokros (Szlifka (substituted on) 79') — Sajbán (Krone (substituted on) 85'), Roguljić (Macsó (substituted on) 85'), Bényei (Komlósi (substituted on) 79'), M. Pető (Purzsa (substituted on) 85'), Má. Mucsányi (Babos (substituted on) 70') — Jurek (Demeter (substituted on) 60'), Šaponjić (Z. Varga (substituted on) 70') • Manager: Radenković

== Competitions ==
=== Overall record ===
In italics, we indicate the Last match and the Final position achieved in competition(s) that have not yet been completed.

| Competition | First match | Last match | Starting round | Final position | Record | | | | | | | |
| Competition | First match | Last match | Starting round | Final position | Pld | W | D | L | GF | GA | GD | Win % |
|---|---|---|---|---|---|---|---|---|---|---|---|---|
| Nemzeti Bajnokság I | 25 July 2025 | 16 May 2026 | Matchday 1 | 11th | 33 | 6 | 10 | 17 | 39 | 65 | −26 | 18.18 |
| Magyar Kupa | 13 September 2025 | 5 March 2026 | Round of 64 | Quarter-final | 4 | 3 | 0 | 1 | 11 | 4 | +7 | 75.00 |
| Total | | | | | 37 | 9 | 10 | 18 | 50 | 69 | −19 | 24.32 |

Last updated: 16 May 2026
Source: Soccerway

=== Nemzeti Bajnokság I ===
==== League table ====
| Pos | Team | Pld | W | D | L | GF | GA | GD | Pts | Qualification or relegation |
|---|---|---|---|---|---|---|---|---|---|---|
| 8 | Kisvárda | 33 | 11 | 7 | 15 | 36 | 49 | −13 | 40 | |
| 9 | Nyíregyháza | 33 | 10 | 10 | 13 | 47 | 57 | −10 | 40 | |
| 10 | MTK | 33 | 9 | 11 | 13 | 55 | 62 | −7 | 38 | |
| 11 | Diósgyőr (R) | 33 | 6 | 10 | 17 | 39 | 65 | −26 | 28 | Relegation to the Nemzeti Bajnokság II |
| 12 | Kazincbarcika (R) | 33 | 6 | 4 | 23 | 31 | 70 | −39 | 22 | Relegation to the Nemzeti Bajnokság II |

Source: Hungarian Football Federation (in Hungarian)
Rules for classification: 1) Points; 2) Matches won; 3) Goal difference; 4) Goals scored; 5) Head-to-head points; 6) Head-to-head goal difference; 7) Fair play ranking; 8) Drawing of lots.
(R) Relegated

==== Results summary ====
| Overall | | | | | | | | Home | | | | | | Away | | | | | |
| Pld | W | D | L | GF | GA | GD | Pts | W | D | L | GF | GA | GD | W | D | L | GF | GA | GD |
|---|---|---|---|---|---|---|---|---|---|---|---|---|---|---|---|---|---|---|---|
| 33 | 6 | 10 | 17 | 39 | 65 | −26 | 28 | 3 | 7 | 6 | 19 | 27 | −8 | 3 | 3 | 11 | 20 | 38 | −18 |

Last updated: 16 May 2026.
Source: Soccerway

==== Matches ====
Win Draw Loss Fixtures Postponed

The draw for the 2025/26 season was held on 16 June 2025.

| 25 July 2025 1 | Újpest | 3–1 | Diósgyőr | Budapest |
| 20:00 CEST | K. Horváth 3', 45+1' (yellow card) 35'; Ademi (yellow card) 58'; Matko 63'; Brodić (yellow card) 65' | Report | Saničanin (yellow card) 31' (red card) 65'; Kecskés (yellow card) 47'; Acolatse (yellow card) 55'; Šaponjić 55' (pen.) | Stadium: Szusza Ferenc Stadion; Attendance: 10,011; Referee: Tamás Bognár; Assistant referees: Péter Kóbor, Péter Ország |
Note: • Diósgyőr: Sentić — Szakos, Kecskés, Saničanin, D. Gera (c) — Vallejo, Esiti (Komlósi (substituted on) 90') — Acolatse (Sajbán (substituted on) 85'), Bényei (Má. Mucsányi (substituted on) 67'), Jurek (Holdampf (substituted on) 67') — Šaponjić • Manager: Radenković • Player of the match: Aljoša Matko, Újpest 8.3 • Best player of Diósgyőr: Anderson Esiti 8.0

| 2 August 2025 2 | Diósgyőr | 2–2 | Zalaegerszeg | Miskolc |
| 17:45 CEST | Kecskés (yellow card) 21'; Demeter 37'; Požeg Vancaš 45+4'; Holdampf (yellow card) 52'; Šaponjić (yellow card) 77'; Komlósi (yellow card) 89' | Report | Várkonyi (yellow card) 45+6' (red card) 86'; João Victor 57'; Szendrei (yellow card) 87'; B. Kiss 90'; Gundel-Takács (yellow card) 90+4' | Stadium: Diósgyőri Stadion; Attendance: 5,679; Referee: Péter Zierkelbach; Assistant referees: Balázs Szert, Bence Belicza |
Note: • Diósgyőr: Sentić — Demeter (Szakos (substituted on) 61'), Kecskés, Komlósi, D. Gera (c) (M. Tamás (substituted on) 76') — Vallejo, Esiti (Holdampf (substituted on) 45+2') — Jurek (Babos (substituted on) 61'), Bényei, Požeg Vancaš (Acolatse (substituted on) 61') — Šaponjić • Manager: Radenković • Player of the match: Ivan Šaponjić, Diósgyőr 8.7 • Best player of Zalaegerszeg: Bence Kiss 8.1

| 9 August 2025 3 | MTK | 5–0 | Diósgyőr | Budapest |
| 17:45 CEST | R. Molnár 7' (pen.), 32', 43' (pen.); Kata 28'; Átrok 79' | Report | Šaponjić (yellow card) 38' | Stadium: Hidegkuti Nándor Stadion; Attendance: 2,200; Referee: Mihály Káprály; Assistant referees: Dániel Szalai, Zoltán Horváth |
Note: • Diósgyőr: Sentić — Szakos, Kecskés, M. Tamás, Demeter — Roguljić (Holdampf (substituted on) 46'), Vallejo (c), Má. Mucsányi (Bényei (substituted on) 46') — Acolatse, Šaponjić (Jurek (substituted on) 46'), Požeg Vancaš (Bárdos (substituted on) 46' (substituted off) 62' (Babós (substituted on) 62')) • Manager: Radenković • Player of the match: Rajmund Molnár, MTK 10.0 • Best player of Diósgyőr: Bence Bárdos 6.9

| 16 August 2025 4 | Diósgyőr | 2–2 | Kazincbarcika | Miskolc |
| 18:15 CEST | G. Megyeri (yellow card) 1'; Demeter (yellow card) 31'; D. Gera (yellow card) 47'; Babós (yellow card) 50'; Vallejo (yellow card) 62'; Babos 74'; M. Tamás (yellow card) 78'; Šaponjić 90+5' (pen.) | Report | Sós (penalty missed) 3'; Baranyai 16'; Meshack 18'; Szőke (yellow card) 84'; Makrai (yellow card) 90'; Haroyan (yellow card) 90+4' | Stadium: Diósgyőri Stadion; Attendance: 5,468; Referee: Gergő Bogár; Assistant referees: Zoltán Horváth, Dávid Rózsa |
Note: • Diósgyőr: G. Megyeri — D. Gera, Babós, M. Tamás, Demeter (Szakos (substituted on) 46') — Bényei (Roguljić (substituted on) 46'), Vallejo, Holdampf (c) (Komlósi (substituted on) 82'), Jurek (Babos (substituted on) 59') — Acolatse (Sajbán (substituted on) 59'), Šaponjić • Manager: Radenković • Player of the match: Meshack Ubochioma, Kazincbarcika 8.2 • Best player of Diósgyőr: Ivan Šaponjić 8.1

| 23 August 2025 5 | Nyíregyháza | 1–4 | Diósgyőr | Nyíregyháza |
| 20:15 CEST | Edomwonyi 58'; Evangelou (yellow card) 86'; L. Katona (yellow card) 90' | Report | Vallejo 35'; Acolatse 65' (pen.) (penalty missed) 78'; Babos 82', 88'; D. Gera (yellow card) 87' | Stadium: Városi Stadion; Attendance: 7,083; Referee: Balázs Berke; Assistant referees: István Albert, Balázs Szalai |
Note: • Diósgyőr: Sentić — D. Gera (c) (Szakos (substituted on) 90'), Kecskés, M. Tamás, Demeter — Vallejo — Acolatse (Jurek (substituted on) 90'), Roguljić (Bényei (substituted on) 72'), Babos, Sajbán (Holdampf (substituted on) 85') — Esiti • Manager: Radenković • Player of the match: Bence Babos, Diósgyőr 8.6 • Best player of Nyíregyháza: Bright Edomwonyi 7.8

| 30 August 2025 6 | Diósgyőr | 1–1 | Puskás Akadémia | Miskolc |
| 17:00 CEST | Maceiras 12' (o.g.); Roguljić (yellow card) 51'; Bényei (yellow card) 84' | Report | Zs. Nagy 49' (pen.); Markgráf (yellow card) 61'; Lukács (yellow card) 88' | Stadium: Diósgyőri Stadion; Attendance: 5,004; Referee: Ferenc Karakó; Assistant referees: Balázs Buzás, Viktor Nagy |
Note: • Diósgyőr: Sentić — D. Gera (c) (Bokros (substituted on) 78'), Kecskés, M. Tamás, Demeter (Szakos (substituted on) 64') — Vallejo, Esiti — Babos, Roguljić (Bényei (substituted on) 64'), Sajbán (Šaponjić (substituted on) 64') — Acolatse (Holdampf (substituted on) 81') • Manager: Radenković • Player of the match: Patrizio Stronati, Puskás Akadémia 8.9 • Best player of Diósgyőr: Dániel Gera 7.4

| 19 September 2025 7 | Ferencváros | 2–2 | Diósgyőr | Budapest |
| 20:00 CEST | Gruber 68', 90+1' (yellow card) 77'; Ötvös (yellow card) 88' | Report | Babos 32'; Acolatse 45+3'; Sajbán (yellow card) 65'; Šaponjić (yellow card) 75' | Stadium: Groupama Aréna; Attendance: 11,769; Referee: Gergő Bogár; Assistant referees: Balázs Szalai, Péter Ország |
Note: • Diósgyőr: Sentić — D. Gera (c), Kecskés, M. Tamás, Demeter — Esiti, Vallejo — Babos (Jurek (substituted on) 74'), A. Keita (Croizet (substituted on) 83'), Sajbán (Šaponjić (substituted on) 69') — Acolatse (Holdampf (substituted on) 83') • Manager: Radenković • Player of the match: Elton Acolatse, 9.9 • Best player of Ferencváros: Zsombor Gruber 8.8 each

| 27 September 2025 8 | Diósgyőr | 0–0 | Debrecen | Miskolc |
| 17:30 CEST | Šaponjić (yellow card) 32'; Demeter (yellow card) 34' | Report | | Stadium: Diósgyőri Stadion; Attendance: 6,279; Referee: Bence Csonka dr. Assistant referees: Balázs Buzás, Péter Garai |
Note: • Diósgyőr: Sentić — D. Gera (c) (Bokros (substituted on) 78'), Kecskés, M. Tamás, Demeter (Szakos (substituted on) 46') — Vallejo, Šaponjić (Sajbán (substituted on) 56') — Babos, Roguljić (Croizet (substituted on) 56'), Bényei — Acolatse (Holdampf (substituted on) 84') • Manager: Radenković • Player of the match: Álex Vallejo, Diósgyőr 7.7 • Best player of Debrecen: Josua Mejías 7.5

| 5 October 2025 9 | Kisvárda | 1–0 | Diósgyőr | Kisvárda |
| 19:00 CEST | Mešanović (yellow card) 19' (goal) 55'; Pintér (yellow card) 90+4' | Report | | Stadium: Várkerti Stadion; Attendance: 2,240; Referee: Bence Hanyecz; Assistant referees: Péter Ország, Viktor Nagy |
Note: • Diósgyőr: Sentić — D. Gera, Kecskés, M. Tamás, Demeter — Babos (Croizet (substituted on) 68'), Vallejo (Jurek (substituted on) 78'), Holdampf (c) (A. Keita (substituted on) 58'), Roguljić (Bényei (substituted on) 58') — Acolatse, Sajbán (Šaponjić (substituted on) 58') • Manager: Radenković • Player of the match: Karlo Sentić, Diósgyőr 7.8 • Best player of Kisvárda: Branimir Cipetić 7.4

| 18 October 2025 10 | Győr | 3–1 | Diósgyőr | Győr |
| 20:30 CEST | Benbouali 29'; Bumba 43'; R. Tóth (yellow card) 59'; Szatmári 74' (o.g.); Huszár (yellow card) 89' | Report | D. Gera 13'; Acolatse (yellow card) 64'; Vallejo (yellow card) 67'; Demeter (yellow card) 90' | Stadium: ETO Park; Attendance: 3,210; Referee: József Erdős; Assistant referees: István Albert, Bence Belicza |
Note: • Diósgyőr: Sentić — D. Gera (c) (Szatmári (substituted on) 46'), Kecskés, M. Tamás, Demeter — Má. Mucsányi (Bényei (substituted on) 58'), Vallejo, A. Keita, Jurek (Croizet (substituted on) 46') — Acolatse (Bokros (substituted on) 79'), Sajbán (Šaponjić (substituted on) 58') • Manager: Radenković • Player of the match: Balázs Dzsudzsák, Győri ETO 8.9 • Best player of Diósgyőr: Dániel Gera 7.2

| 25 October 2025 11 | Diósgyőr | 2–1 | Paks | Miskolc |
| 17:00 CEST | Má. Mucsányi (yellow card) 51'; Šaponjić 56'; Acolatse (yellow card) 68' (goal) 88'; Sentić (yellow card) 90+2' | Report | Gyurkits (yellow card) 74'; Papp 90+2' | Stadium: Diósgyőri Stadion; Attendance: 4,001; Referee: Balázs Berke; Assistant referees: Vencel Tóth II., Balázs Szert |
Note: • Diósgyőr: Sentić — Szatmári, Šaponjić (Sajbán (substituted on) 87'), Bárdos — Croizet (A. Keita (substituted on) 80'), Má. Mucsányi (Jurek (substituted on) 64'), Bokros, Holdampf (c), Szakos (Demeter (substituted on) 87') — Acolatse, Esiti • Manager: Radenković • Player of the match: Elton Acolatse, Diósgyőr 8.5 • Best player of Paks: Gergő Gyurkits 7.1

| 2 November 2025 12 | Diósgyőr | 1–3 | Újpest | Miskolc |
| 15:30 CET | Acolatse 23' (pen.) (yellow card) 52'; Jurek (yellow card) 47'; A. Keita (yellow card) 49' | Report | Bokros 35' (o.g.); Kr. Horváth 42' (yellow card) 49'; Bese (red card) 45+8'; Medeiros (yellow card) 50'; Matko 83' | Stadium: Diósgyőri Stadion; Attendance: 5,855; Referee: Bence Csonka dr. Assistant referees: Georgiou Theodoros, József Aradi |
Note: • Diósgyőr: Sentić — D. Gera (c), Szatmári (Lund (substituted on) 46'), Bárdos, Bokros (Má. Mucsányi (substituted on) 76') — Jurek, Mi. Mucsányi (Roguljić (substituted on) 61'), A. Keita (Komlósi (substituted on) 55'), Croizet — Acolatse (Babos (substituted on) 55'), Sajbán • Manager: Radenković • Player of the match: Krisztofer Horváth, Újpest 7.7 • Best player of Diósgyőr: Elton Acolatse 7.3

| 8 November 2025 13 | Zalaegerszeg | 2–0 | Diósgyőr | Zalaegerszeg |
| 14:45 CET | Peraza (yellow card) 46'; Skribek 55'; Daniel 89' | Report | Vallejo (yellow card) 46'; Holdampf (yellow card) 48'; Mi. Mucsányi (yellow card) 67'; Szakos (yellow card) 75' | Stadium: ZTE Arena; Attendance: 2,610; Referee: Ferenc Karakó; Assistant referees: Péter Kóbor, Dávid Rózsa |
Note: • Diósgyőr: Sentić — Szakos, Szatmári, Vallejo (Bényei (substituted on) 84'), Bárdos — Croizet (Má. Mucsányi (substituted on) 60'), Holdampf (c) (Babos (substituted on) 84'), Mi. Mucsányi (A. Keita (substituted on) 69'), D. Gera (Bokros (substituted on) 69') — Acolatse, Sajbán • Manager: Radenković • Player of the match: Alen Skribek, Zalaegerszeg 8.2 • Best player of Diósgyőr: Elton Acolatse 6.7

| 23 November 2025 14 | Diósgyőr | 4–0 | MTK | Miskolc |
| 18:30 CET | Babos 25'; M. Tamás 46'; Acolatse 68' (pen.); A. Keita 77'; Bényei (yellow card) 88' | Report | Beriashvili (red card) 66'; Plšek (yellow card) 70'; K. Németh (yellow card) 76' | Stadium: Diósgyőri Stadion; Attendance: 2,205; Referee: Imre Kovács; Assistant referees: Norbert Bornemissza, Bence Belicza |
Note: • Diósgyőr: Sentić — M. Tamás, Szatmári, Vallejo, Bokros — Mi. Mucsányi (Komlósi (substituted on) 82'), A. Keita (Holdampf (substituted on) 82'), Má. Mucsányi (Sajbán (substituted on) 60'), D. Gera (c) — Babos (Bényei (substituted on) 82'), Acolatse (Jurek (substituted on) 82') • Manager: Radenković • Player of the match: Elton Acolatse, Diósgyőr 10.0 • Best player of MTK: Mihály Kata 6.8

| 29 November 2025 15 | Kazincbarcika | 1–1 | Diósgyőr | Mezőkövesd |
| 14:30 CET | Meskhi 31'; Rasheed (yellow card) 46'; Šlogar (yellow card) 54'; Rácz (yellow card) 68'; Deutsch (yellow card) 70'; Meshack (yellow card) 71' | Report | D. Gera (yellow card) 19'; Má. Mucsányi 26' | Stadium: Városi Stadion; Attendance: 1,504; Referee: Marcell Derdák; Assistant referees: Vencel Tóth II, Gergő Vígh-Tarsonyi |
Note: • Diósgyőr: Sentić — D. Gera (c), Szatmári, M. Tamás (Kecskés (substituted on) 46'), Bokros — Vallejo — Babos (Sajbán (substituted on) 80'), Mi. Mucsányi (Komlósi (substituted on) 69'), A. Keita, Acolatse — Má. Mucsányi (Jurek (substituted on) 60') • Manager: Radenković • Player of the match: Elton Acolatse, Diósgyőr 8.1 • Best player of Kazincbarcika: Bálint Kártik 7.5

| 6 December 2025 16 | Diósgyőr | 2–0 | Nyíregyháza | Miskolc |
| 12:30 CET | Acolatse 5', 70'; Bokros (yellow card) 41'; Mi. Mucsányi (yellow card) 77' | Report | L. Katona (yellow card) 41' (yellow-red card) 47'; Farkas (yellow card) 54' | Stadium: Diósgyőri Stadion; Attendance: 5,052; Referee: Péter Antal; Assistant referees: István Szécsényi, Dániel Szalai |
Note: • Diósgyőr: Sentić — D. Gera (c), Szatmári, Kecskés, Bokros — Mi. Mucsányi (Demeter (substituted on) 90+2'), Vallejo, A. Keita, Acolatse (Holdampf (substituted on) 90+2') — Má. Mucsányi (Sajbán (substituted on) 62'), Babos (Jurek (substituted on) 78') • Manager: Radenković • Player of the match: Elton Acolatse, Diósgyőr 8.3 • Best player of Nyíregyháza: Bálint Katona 7.3

| 13 December 2025 17 | Puskás Akadémia | 2–1 | Diósgyőr | Felcsút |
| 16:30 CET | Lukács 19', 47'; Szolnoki (yellow card) 77' | Report | Acolatse 10'; Mi. Mucsányi (yellow card) 16' | Stadium: Pancho Aréna; Attendance: 1,026; Referee: Imre Kovács; Assistant referees: József Aradi, Viktor Nagy |
Note: • Diósgyőr: Sentić — D. Gera (c), Kecskés (Bárdos (substituted on) 52'), Szatmári, Bokros — Vallejo (Holdampf (substituted on) 65') — Babos (Jurek (substituted on) 76'), Mi. Mucsányi (Demeter (substituted on) 76'), A. Keita, Acolatse — Sajbán (Bényei (substituted on) 65') • Manager: Radenković • Player of the match: Dániel Lukács, Puskás Akadémia 8.3 • Best player of Diósgyőr: Elton Acolatse 7.7

| 19 December 2025 18 | Diósgyőr | 0–1 | Ferencváros | Miskolc |
| 20:00 CET | Szatmári (yellow card) 68'; Bényei (yellow card) 71'; Mi. Mucsányi (yellow card) 83' | Report | O'Dowda (yellow card) 45+1'; Tóth (yellow card) 51'; Szalai 57'; Raemaekers (yellow card) 62'; B. Varga (yellow card) 90+4' | Stadium: Diósgyőri Stadion; Attendance: 6,510; Referee: Tamás Bognár; Assistant referees: Balázs Buzás, Bence Belicza |
Note: • Diósgyőr: Sentić — D. Gera, Szatmári, Holdampf (c) (Má. Mucsányi (substituted on) 82'), Bokros — Mi. Mucsányi, A. Keita, Vallejo (Bárdos (substituted on) 66'), Acolatse — Babos (Bényei (substituted on) 66'), Šaponjić (Sajbán (substituted on) 59') • Manager: Radenković • Player of the match: Ibrahim Cissé, Ferencváros 7.8 • Best player of Diósgyőr: Máté Sajbán 7.4

| 25 January 2026 19 | Debrecen | 3–2 | Diósgyőr | Debrecen |
| 13:00 CET | Kulbachuk (yellow card) 11'; Cibla 45+1'; Kusnyír 49'; T. Szűcs 56'; Manzanara (yellow card) 90' | Report | Colley 15' (yellow card) 65'; Bokros 19'; Bárdos (yellow card) 78' | Stadium: Nagyerdei Stadion; Attendance: 3,902; Referee: Gergő Bogár; Assistant referees: Balázs Buzás, Bence Belicza |
Note: • Player of the match: Erik Kusnyír, Debrecen 8.2 • Best player of Diósgyőr: Lamin Colley 7.8

| 1 February 2026 20 | Diósgyőr | 1–1 | Kisvárda | Miskolc |
| 12:45 CET | Bényei 39' | Report | Radmanovac (yellow card) 49'; Yordanov 69' (pen.); Jovičić (yellow card) 78' | Stadium: Diósgyőri Stadion; Attendance: 1,176; Referee: Balázs Berke; Assistant referees: Dániel Szalai, Dávid Rózsa |
Note: • Diósgyőr: Sentić — Szakos (Demeter (substituted on) 70'), Szatmári, M. Tamás, Bokros — Babos (Bárdos (substituted on) 70'), Holdampf (c) (Vallejo (substituted on) 70'), A. Keita, Pető (Esiti (substituted on) 57') — Colley, Šaponjić (Bényei (substituted on) 22') • Manager: Radenković • Player of the match: Bálint Oláh, Kisvárda 8.0 • Best player of Diósgyőr: Márk Tamás 7.4

| 7 February 2026 21 | Diósgyőr | 1–1 | Győr | Miskolc |
| 12:45 CET | Bárdos (yellow card) 35'; Holdampf (yellow card) 40'; Colley (yellow card) 43' (goal) 63'; Bokros (yellow card) 60'; Má. Mucsányi (yellow card) 90+3' | Report | Krpić (yellow card) 29'; Njie 37' | Stadium: Diósgyőri Stadion; Attendance: 973; Referee: Péter Antal; Assistant referees: Georgiou Theodoros, Viktor Nagy |
Note: • Diósgyőr: Sentić — Szakos, Szatmári, Bárdos, Bokros — Esiti (Bényei (substituted on) 53'), A. Keita (Croizet (substituted on) 46') — Babos (Sajbán (substituted on) 53'), Holdampf (c), Pető (Má. Mucsányi (substituted on) 46') — Colley (Roguljić (substituted on) 86') • Manager: Radenković • Player of the match: Lamin Colley, Diósgyőr 8.5 • Best player of Győri ETO: Balázs Megyeri 8.2

| 14 February 2026 22 | Paks | 1–2 | Diósgyőr | Paks |
| 19:15 CET | Hinora (yellow card) 43'; Alaxai (yellow card) 59'; Gyurkits 90+2'; Lenzsér (yellow card) 90+5' | Report | Má. Mucsányi (yellow card) 13'; Colley (yellow card) 22'; Holdampf (yellow card) 34'; Bárdos (yellow card) 60'; Bokros (yellow card) 68'; Sentić (yellow card) 77'; Roguljić 85'; A. Keita 90' (pen.) | Stadium: Fehérvári úti Stadion; Attendance: 2,375; Referee: Imre Kovács; Assistant referees: Bence Belicza, István Szécsényi |
Note: • Diósgyőr: Sentić — Szakos, Szatmári, Bárdos, Bokros — Croizet (Sajbán (substituted on) 56'), Holdampf (c), Vallejo (Roguljić (substituted on) 71'), Esiti (A. Keita (substituted on) 56') — Colley (Bényei (substituted on) 82'), Má. Mucsányi (Ambrose (substituted on) 71') • Manager: Radenković • Player of the match: Karlo Sentić, Diósgyőr 8.6 • Best player of Paks: Zsombor Bévárdi 7.7

| 21 February 2026 23 | Újpest | 2–1 | Diósgyőr | Budapest |
| 18:30 CET | Vlijter 19'; Gradišar 22'; Fiola (yellow card) 57'; Stronati (yellow card) 87' | Report | Holdampf (yellow card) 29'; L. Kastrati (yellow card) 39'; Esiti (yellow card) 83'; Croizet 88' (pen.) | Stadium: Szusza Ferenc Stadion; Attendance: 4,243; Referee: Bence Csonka dr. Assistant referees: Gergő Vígh-Tarsonyi, Viktor Nagy |
Note: • Diósgyőr: Sentić — Szakos (Pető (substituted on) 26'), Szatmári, Bárdos, Bokros — Holdampf (c) (Croizet (substituted on) 69'), Roguljić (L. Kastrati (substituted on) 26') — Ambrose (Vallejo (substituted on) 46'), Esiti, Má. Mucsányi (Sajbán (substituted on) 33') — Colley • Manager: Radenković • Player of the match: Gleofilo Vlijter, Újpest 8.3 • Best player of Diósgyőr: Karlo Sentić 7.9

| 28 February 2026 24 | Diósgyőr | 1–1 | Zalaegerszeg | Miskolc |
| 17:00 CET | Bényei (yellow card) 12'; Bokros (yellow card) 17'; Babos 57' (yellow card) 84' | Report | Calderón (yellow card) 84'; Victory 85'; Maxsuell (yellow card) 90+3' | Stadium: Diósgyőri Stadion; Attendance: 1,423; Referee: Gergő Bogár; Assistant referees: István Albert, Bence Belicza |

| 8 March 2026 25 | MTK | 1–1 | Diósgyőr | Budapest |
| 13:30 CET | Kata (yellow card) 7'; Átrok 70'; V. Vitályos (yellow card) 73'; Kerezsi (yellow card) 73' | Report | Bárdos (yellow card) 10'; Colley 36'; Babos (yellow card) 73'; Holdampf (yellow card) 90+4' | Stadium: Hidegkuti Nándor Stadion; Attendance: 3,124; Referee: Tamás Bognár; Assistant referees: István Széchenyi, Dávid Rózsa |
Note: • Diósgyőr: Sentić — Szakos, Szatmári, Bárdos, Bokros — Bényei (Sajbán (substituted on) 59'), Vallejo (c), Esiti (A. Keita (substituted on) 73'), Pető (Tamás (substituted on) 90+1') — Colley (Ambrose (substituted on) 73'), Babos (Holdampf (substituted on) 73') • Manager: Vignjević • Player of the match: István Átrok, MTK 7.9 • Best player of Diósgyőr: Bence Bárdos 7.6

| 13 March 2026 26 | Diósgyőr | 0–4 | Kazincbarcika | Miskolc |
| 17:45 CET | | Report | Meskhi 11'; Kártik 45+7' (pen.); Nyíri 71'; Ikoba 74' | Stadium: Diósgyőri Stadion; Attendance: 2,114; Referee: Péter Antal; Assistant referees: Balázs Szert, Dániel Szalai |

| 21 March 2026 27 | Nyíregyháza | 3–1 | Diósgyőr | Nyíregyháza |
| 14:00 CET | L. Katona 55'; Tijani 72', 81' | Report | Sajbán 88' | Stadium: Városi Stadion; Attendance: 7,093; Referee: Bence Csonka dr. Assistant referees: Gergő Vígh-Tarsonyi, Norbert Bornemissza |

| 5 April 2026 28 | Diósgyőr | 1–2 | Puskás Akadémia | Miskolc |
| 14:30 CEST | Vallejo 19'; Esiti (yellow card) 66'; Sentić (yellow card) 76' | Report | Lukács (yellow card) 13' (goal) 85'; Zs. Nagy 90+3' (pen.) | Stadium: Diósgyőri Stadion; Attendance: 3,105; Referee: Péter Antal; Assistant referees: Péter Kóbor, Bence Belicza |
Note: • Diósgyőr: Sentić — L. Kastrati, Szatmári, M. Tamás, Bokros — Vallejo (c), Esiti (Szakos (substituted on) 83') — Roguljić (Holdampf (substituted on) 63'), Bényei (Babos (substituted on) 74'), Pető — Sajbán (Colley (substituted on) 63') • Manager: Vignjević • Player of the match: Ante Roguljić, Diósgyőr 7.8 • Best player of Puskás Akadémia: Ákos Markgráf 7.5

| 10 April 2026 29 | Ferencváros | 3–1 | Diósgyőr | Budapest |
| 20:00 CEST | Acolatse 51'; Joseph 60'; Gómez 76' | Report | Pető 23' (yellow card) 32'; L. Kastrati (yellow card) 75'; M. Tamás (yellow card) 87'; Vallejo (yellow card) 90+4' | Stadium: Groupama Aréna; Attendance: 9,417; Referee: Ferenc Karakó; Assistant referees: Gergő Vígh-Tarsonyi, Viktor Nagy |
Note: • Diósgyőr: G. Megyeri — L. Kastrati (Szakos (substituted on) 77'), Szatmári, M. Tamás, Bárdos — Bokros, Holdampf (c), Vallejo, Macsó (Šaponjić (substituted on) 80') — Colley (Ambrose (substituted on) 77'), Pető • Manager: Vignjević • Player of the match: Mariano Gómez, Ferencváros 8.6 • Best player of Diósgyőr: Milán Pető 7.0

| 18 April 2026 30 | Diósgyőr | 0–5 | Debrecen | Miskolc |
| 19:30 CEST | | Report | Szatmári 35' (o.g.); Cibla 39', 90'; M. Tamás 52' (o.g.); D. Kocsis 79' | Stadium: DVTK Stadion; Attendance: 3,555; Referee: Marcell Derdák; Assistant referees: Péter Kóbor, Dávid Rózsa |
Note: • Diósgyőr: Sentić — L. Kastrati (Szakos (substituted on) 55'), Szatmári, M. Tamás, Bokros — Holdampf (c) (Croizet (substituted on) 74'), Vallejo, Bényei — Pető (Roguljić (substituted on) 67'), Šaponjić (Colley (substituted on) 55'), Macsó (Galántai (substituted on) 67') • Manager: Vignjević • Player of the match: Flórián Cibla, Debrecen 9.4 • Best player of Diósgyőr: Lamin Colley 7.2

| 25 April 2026 31 | Kisvárda | 1–2 | Diósgyőr | Kisvárda |
| 14:30 CEST | Matanović 22'; Jovičić (yellow card) 37'; G. Molnár (yellow card) 90' (yellow-red card) 90' | Report | A. Keita (yellow card) 15'; Pető 38' (pen.); Colley 54'; Esiti (yellow card) 73' | Stadium: Várkerti Stadion; Attendance: 1,486; Referee: Bence Hanyecz; Assistant referees: István Albert, Balázs Buzás |
Note: • Interim manager: Takács

| 2 May 2026 32 | Győr | 4–0 | Diósgyőr | Győr |
| 19:15 CEST | Schön 33', 47'; Benbouali 44'; Farkas 66' (o.g.); Vitális (yellow card) 86' | Report | Esiti (yellow card) 40'; Bárdos (yellow card) 62' | Stadium: ETO Park; Attendance: 7,781; Referee: Marcell Derdák; Assistant referees: Balázs Szalai, Péter Ország |
Note: • Diósgyőr: Bánhegyi — Szakos, Szatmári (Komlósi (substituted on) 77'), M. Tamás, Bárdos — B. Kiss — Kovalenko, Esiti (Sajbán (substituted on) 46'), Holdampf (c) (Z. Varga (substituted on) 77'), Macsó (L. Kiss (substituted on) 68') — Galántai (Farkas (substituted on) 46') • Interim manager: Takács • Player of the match: Szabolcs Schön, Győri ETO 10.0 • Best player of Diósgyőr: Márk Tamás 6.7

| 16 May 2026 33 | Diósgyőr | 1–3 | Paks | Miskolc |
| 17:15 CEST | B. Kiss (yellow card) 5'; Holdampf (yellow card) 30'; M. Tamás (yellow card) 62'; Galántai 90+3' | Report | Hahn 1', 31'; Gyurkits 18'; B. Tóth (yellow card) 63' | Stadium: Diósgyőri Stadion; Attendance: 104; Referee: Balázs Berke; Assistant referees: Gergely Becséri, Dávid Rózsa |

=== Magyar Kupa ===
| 13 September 2025 R64 | Hódmezővásárhely (NB III) | 1–3 | Diósgyőr | Hódmezővásárhely |
| 15:00 CEST | Kálovits (yellow card) 36'; P. Tóth 39' (yellow card) 56'; Zámbori (yellow card) 65'; Rajsli (yellow card) 90+1' | Report | Šaponjić 26' (pen.), 37' (pen.) (yellow card) 33'; A. Keita 73' | Stadium: Városi Stadion; Attendance: 1,000; Referee: Bence Hanyecz; Assistant referees: Balázs Buzás, Bence Belicza |

| 28 October 2025 R32 | Diósgyőr | 2–0 | Szeged (NB II) | Miskolc |
| 20:00 CET | Sajbán 36', 69'; A. Keita (yellow card) 45+1'; Holdampf (yellow card) 64' | Report | Szilágyi (yellow card) 13'; Vágó (yellow card) 25' | Stadium: Diósgyőri Stadion; Attendance: 2,005; Referee: Péter Zierkelbach; Assistant referees: Balázs Buzás, Bence Belicza |
Note: • Diósgyőr: Megyeri — Szakos, Szatmári, Lund, Bokros — Jurek (Má. Mucsányi (substituted on) 60'), Esiti (Holdampf (substituted on) 46'), A. Keita (Vallejo (substituted on) 80'), Croizet (Bényei (substituted on) 80') — Acolatse (Mi. Mucsányi (substituted on) 90'), Sajbán • Manager: Radenković

| 11 February 2026 R16 | Paks | 2–6 | Diósgyőr | Paks |
| 20:00 CET | Lenzsér (yellow card) 14'; Windecker 25'; Ádám 43'; Alaxai (yellow card) 64'; Ke. Horváth (yellow card) 74' | Report | Croizet 1'; Sajbán 12'; Má. Mucsányi 20', 60'; Colley 28', 47' (yellow card) 49'; Bokros (yellow card) 48' | Stadium: Fehérvári úti Stadion; Attendance: 1,312; Referee: Mihály Káprály; Assistant referees: Zoltán Horváth, Gergely Becséri |
Note: • Diósgyőr: Megyeri — Kastrati, Szatmári, Bárdos, Bokros — Má. Mucsányi (Macsó (substituted on) 87'), Holdampf (c), Vallejo (Bényei (substituted on) 87'), Croizet (A. Keita (substituted on) 63') — Colley (Ambrose (substituted on) 58'), Sajbán • Manager: Radenković

| 5 March 2026 QF | Budapest Honvéd (NB II) | 1–0 | Diósgyőr | Budapest |
| 20:00 CET | Pauljević (yellow card) 25'; Szamosi (yellow card) 27'; Baki (yellow card) 48'; Gyurcsó 64'; Kállai (yellow card) 82'; K. Varga (yellow card) 90+3' | Report | Tamás (yellow card) 72' | Stadium: Bozsik Aréna; Attendance: 3,934; Referee: Ferenc Karakó; Assistant referees: Norbert Bornemissza, József Aradi |
Note: • Diósgyőr: Megyeri — Szakos, Bárdos, Tamás, Bokros — Holdampf (c) (Bényei (substituted on) 81'), A. Keita (Esiti (substituted on) 69') — Sajbán (Babos (substituted on) 75'), Roguljić (Ambrose (substituted on) 75'), Pető (Z. Varga (substituted on) 69') — Colley • Manager: Radenković

== See also ==
- List of Diósgyőri VTK seasons
