= Mucsányi =

Mucsányi is a Hungarian surname. Notable people with the name include:

- Márk Mucsányi (born 2001), Hungarian footballer, brother of Miron
- Miron Mucsányi (born 2005), Hungarian footballer
