= List of Diósgyőri VTK seasons =

Diósgyőr-Vasgyári Testgyakorlók Köre is a professional football club based in Miskolc, Hungary.

== Key ==
Nemzeti Bajnokság I

- Pld = Matches played
- W = Matches won
- D = Matches drawn
- L = Matches lost
- GF = Goals for
- GA = Goals against
- Pts = Points
- Pos = Final position

Hungarian football league system

- NBI = Nemzeti Bajnokság I
- NBII = Nemzeti Bajnokság II
- NBIII = Nemzeti Bajnokság III
- MBI = Megyei Bajnokság I

Magyar Kupa

- F = Final
- SF = Semi-finals
- QF = Quarter-finals
- R16 = Round of 16
- R32 = Round of 32
- R64 = Round of 64
- R128 = Round of 128

UEFA

- F = Final
- SF = Semi-finals
- QF = Quarter-finals
- Group = Group stage
- PO = Play-offs
- QR3 = Third qualifying round
- QR2 = Second qualifying round
- QR1 = First qualifying round
- PR = Preliminary round

Winners	Runners-up	Third	Promoted	Relegated

== Seasons ==
As of 5 March 2026.

Season	League										Cup	UEFA		Manager	Ref.
Season	Tier	Div.	MP	W	D	L	GF	GA	Pts.	Pos.	Cup	Competition	Result	Manager	Ref.
1940–41	1	NBI	26	11	5	10	61	57	27	6th		Did not qualify		(Hungary) Csapkay	
1941–42	1	NBI	30	10	9	11	72	68	29	8th	R	Did not qualify		(Hungary) Csapkay	
1942–43	1	NBI	30	9	8	13	54	78	26	12th		Did not qualify		(Hungary) Wetzer	
1943–44	1	NBI	30	11	6	13	49	59	28	11th		Did not qualify		(Hungary) Tomecskó	
1945	1	NBI ↓	22	4	1	17	29	82	9	10th		Did not qualify		(Hungary) Tomecskó	
		Nemzeti Bajnokság II													
1950	1	NBI	15	5	6	4	21	23	16	8th		Did not qualify		(Hungary) Tomecskó	
1951	1	NBI	26	6	7	13	31	52	19	11th		Did not qualify		(Hungary) Tomecskó	
1952	1	NBI ↓	26	6	4	16	31	64	16	13th		Did not qualify		(Hungary) Szabó	
		Nemzeti Bajnokság II													
1954	1	NBI	26	10	3	13	49	61	23	9th		Did not qualify		(Hungary) Jánosi	
1955	1	NBI ↓	26	6	7	13	40	53	19	12th		Did not qualify		(Hungary) Jánosi	
		Nemzeti Bajnokság II													
1957–58	1	NBI	26	10	6	10	32	35	26	9th		Did not qualify		(Hungary) Teleki	
1958–59	1	NBI	26	6	10	10	28	35	22	9th		Did not qualify		(Hungary) Kiss	
1959–60	1	NBI	26	10	7	9	35	30	27	5th		Did not qualify		(Hungary) Kiss	
1960–61	1	NBI ↓	26	3	6	17	25	65	12	14th		Did not qualify		(Hungary) Bodola	
		Nemzeti Bajnokság II													
1963	1	NBI	13	4	3	6	12	19	11	11th		Did not qualify		(Hungary) Bukovi	
1964	1	NBI ↓	26	4	6	16	14	38	14	14th		Did not qualify		(Hungary) Nagy	
		Nemzeti Bajnokság II													
1966	1	NBI	26	10	4	12	30	31	24	9th		Did not qualify		(Hungary) Preiner	
1967	1	NBI	30	10	8	12	48	54	28	7th		Did not qualify		(Hungary) Szabó	
1968	1	NBI	30	8	8	14	36	56	24	13th		Did not qualify		(Hungary) Sebes, (Hungary) Szigeti	
1969	1	NBI	30	7	9	14	31	51	23	13th		Did not qualify		(Hungary) Tátrai	
1970	1	NBI	14	7	4	3	16	13	18	8th		Did not qualify		(Hungary) Tátrai	
1970–71	1	NBI	30	10	7	13	24	46	32	12th		Did not qualify		(Hungary) Tóth	
1971–72	1	NBI	30	9	6	15	32	46	24	12th		Did not qualify		(Hungary) Tóth	
1972–73	1	NBI ↓	30	9	6	15	32	46	24	15th		Did not qualify		(Hungary) Preiner	
		Nemzeti Bajnokság II													
1974–75	1	NBI	28	7	11	10	26	37	25	11th		Did not qualify		(Hungary) Szabó	
1975–76	1	NBI	30	6	12	12	26	44	24	14th		Did not qualify		(Hungary) Szabó	
1976–77	1	NBI	34	13	6	15	40	52	32	10th	W	Did not qualify		(Hungary) Szabó	
1978–79	1	NBI	34	19	6	9	60	37	44	3rd		Did not qualify		(Hungary) Szabó	
1979–80	1	NBI	34	12	8	14	47	42	32	12th	W	UEFA Cup	3R	(Hungary) Szabó	
1980–81	1	NBI	34	5	15	14	28	50	25	15th	R	Cup Winners' Cup	PR	(Hungary) Szabó, (Hungary) Deák, (Hungary) Puskás	
1981–82	1	NBI	34	9	11	14	48	62	29	14th		Did not qualify		(Hungary) Puskás	
1982–83	1	NBI	30	8	11	11	36	44	27	9th		Did not qualify		(Hungary) Puskás	
1983–84	1	NBI ↓	30	2	9	19	25	53	13	16th		Did not qualify		(Hungary) Fekete	
		Nemzeti Bajnokság II													
1991–92	1	NBI	30	6	10	14	24	44	22	14th ^{1}		Did not qualify		(Romania) Vlad	
1992–93	1	NBI ↓	30	7	9	14	26	45	23	13th		Did not qualify		(Ukraine) Sándor	
1993–94	2	NBII	30	13	8	9	44	39	34	4th		Did not qualify			
1994–95	2	NBII	30	12	10	8	47	33	46	7th		Did not qualify			
1995–96	2	NBII	30	16	10	4	60	25	58	3rd		Did not qualify			
1996–97	2	NBII	28	15	7	6	35	23	52	2nd		Did not qualify			
1997–98	1	NBI	34	12	8	14	46	41	44	11th		Did not qualify		(Hungary) Tornyi	
1998–99	1	NBI	34	14	9	11	56	54	51	8th		Intertoto Cup	2R	(Hungary) Tornyi	
1999-00	1	NBI ↓	32	5	9	18	26	56	24	16th		Did not qualify		(Hungary) Szapor, (Hungary) Temesvári	
2000–01	3	NBIII	20	16	6	10	57	37	54	2nd		Did not qualify			
2001–02	2	NBII	32	16	6	10	57	37	54	2nd		Did not qualify			
2002–03	2	NBII	34	12	8	14	45	50	38	15th		Did not qualify			
2003–04	2	NBII	34	17	6	11	54	44	57	4th		Did not qualify			
2004–05	1	NBI	30	11	4	15	39	45	37	9th		Did not qualify		(Hungary) Gálhidi	
2005–06	1	NBI	30	10	7	13	33	44	37	8th		Did not qualify		(Hungary) Pajkos	
2006–07	1	NBI	30	11	5	14	40	52	38	9th		Did not qualify		(Hungary) Csank	
2007–08	1	NBI	30	5	13	12	43	63	28	13th	R16	Did not qualify		(Hungary) Pajkos, (Hungary) Vágó	
2008–09	1	NBI	30	9	6	15	29	45	33	12th	L8	Did not qualify		(Hungary) Gálhidi, (Hungary) Sisa	
2009–10	1	NBI ↓	30	4	5	21	31	56	17	16th	R2	Did not qualify		(Hungary) Dusztlus	
2010–11	2	NBII ↑	30	22	2	6	66	23	68	1st	?	Did not qualify		(Hungary) Szentes	
2011–12	1	NBI	30	13	4	13	42	43	43	7th	R16	Did not qualify		(Hungary) Benczés, (Hungary) Szentes	
2012–13	1	NBI	30	9	11	10	31	39	38	10th	R16	Did not qualify		(Hungary) Szentes, (Croatia) Kovács	
2013–14	1	NBI	30	12	11	7	45	38	47	5th	R	Did not qualify		(Serbia) Sivić	
2014–15	1	NBI	30	13	9	8	43	36	48	7th	R16	Europa League	3QR	(Serbia) Sivić, (Hungary) Vitelki	
2015–16	1	NBI	33	10	8	15	37	47	38	9th	R32	Did not qualify		(Hungary) Bekő (Hungary) Egervári	
2016–17	1	NBI	33	10	7	16	39	58	37	10th	QF	Did not qualify		(Hungary) Egervári, (Hungary) Horváth, (Hungary) Bódog	
2017–18	1	NBI	33	10	6	17	44	53	36	10th	QF	Did not qualify		(Hungary) Bódog, (Spain) Fernando	
2018–19	1	NBI	33	10	8	15	36	57	38	10th	R32	Did not qualify		(Spain) Fernando	
2019–20	1	NBI	33	12	5	16	40	52	41	9th	R32	Did not qualify		(Spain) Fernando, (Hungary) Feczkó	
2020–21	1	NBI ↓	33	9	6	18	34	53	33	11th	R16	Did not qualify		(Hungary) Feczkó, (Croatia) Zekić	
2021–22	2	NBII	38	21	9	8	57	40	72	3rd	R32	Did not qualify		(Hungary) Kondás, (Serbia) Vukmir	
2022–23	2	NBII ↑	38	28	3	7	79	36	87	1st	R64	Did not qualify		(Ukraine) Kuznetsov	
2023–24	1	NBI	33	12	9	12	50	56	45	7th	R64	Did not qualify		(Ukraine) Kuznetsov, (Hungary) Simon, (Serbia) Radenković	
2024–25	1	NBI	33	11	11	11	43	51	44	6th	R64	Did not qualify		(Serbia) Radenković, (Lithuania) Dambrauskas	
2025–26	1	NB I ↓	33	6	10	17	39	65	28	11th	QF	Did not qualify		(Serbia) Radenković	
2026–27	2	NBII												(Hungary) Takács, (Hungary) Kriston (interim), (Hungary) Feczkó	

Notes

- Note 1: Relegation play-off: Diósgyőr 2–1 BKV Előre; BKV Előre 0–1 Diósgyőr
