= Anderson Esiti =

Nigerian footballer (born 1994)

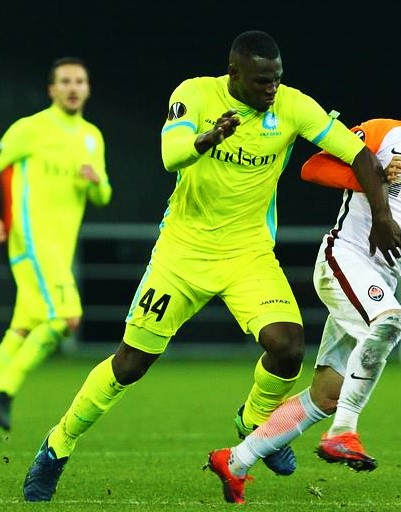
- Esiti with Gent

Personal information
- Date of birth: 24 May 1994 (age 32)
- Place of birth: Warri, Nigeria
- Height: 1.89 m (6 ft 2 in)
- Position: Midfielder

Team information
- Current team: Borac Banja Luka
- Number: 13

Youth career
- 2013–2014: Leixões

Senior career*
Years	Team	Apps	(Gls)
2012–2014	Leixões	36	(0)
2014–2016	Estoril	44	(0)
2016–2019	Gent	77	(0)
2019–2022	PAOK	37	(0)
2021	→ Göztepe (loan)	20	(1)
2022–2024	Ferencváros	36	(2)
2025–2025	Zalaegerszeg	10	(0)
2025–2026	Diósgyőr	17	(0)
2026–	Borac Banja Luka	2	(0)

International career
2015–2019	Nigeria	3	(0)
- * Club domestic league appearances and goals as of 6 September 2026

Anderson Esiti (born 24 May 1994) is a Nigerian professional footballer who plays as a midfielder for Bosnian Premier League club Borac Banja Luka. He also played for the Nigeria national team.

== Club career ==
Born on 24 May 1994, in Warri, Esiti took his first steps in Football Academy Bobbies United. In 2012 he made his trip to Europe to join Leixões. After a few games with the second-string team, he was promoted to the senior side of the club, and played 45 matches. His overall performance caught the eye of José Mário Branco, technical director of Estoril at the time and they signed him. He fit right at in his new team. He remained there for two seasons, featuring in 57 appearances. He established himself as one of the leading midfielders in the league and attracted interest from various clubs around Europe. Eventually he signed with Gent making a total of 95 appearances in all competitions.

On 25 July 2019, PAOK confirmed the arrival of Esiti, who signed a four-year contract with the club. The transfer fee paid to Gent was €3.5 million. He was to fill a gap in defensive midfield for PAOK as the midfielders Jose Canas and Yevhen Shakhov, key members of the PAOK squad, had already left the club this summer. In the 2018–19 season, Esiti made 30 appearances for Gent across all competitions.

In his first match with PAOK after his return from the loan to Göztepe, in a friendly match against Volos, Esiti scored his first goal for PAOK.

=== Ferencváros ===
In February 2022, Esiti moved to Hungarian club Ferencváros. PAOK retained a percentage in their rights in the event of a resale.

On 5 May 2023, he won the 2022–23 Nemzeti Bajnokság I with Ferencváros, after Kecskemét lost 1–0 to Honvéd at the Bozsik Aréna on the 30th matchday.

On 20 April 2024, the Ferencváros–Kisvárda tie ended with a goalless draw at the Groupama Aréna on the 29th match day of the 2023–24 Nemzeti Bajnokság I season which meant that Ferencváros won their 35th championship.

On 15 May 2024, Ferencváros were defeated by Paks 2–0 in the 2024 Magyar Kupa Final at the Puskás Aréna.

=== Zalaegerszeg ===
On 9 January 2025, Esiti moved from Hungarian club Ferencváros to Zalaegerszeg.

== Career statistics ==
=== Club ===
As of match played 6 September 2026

Appearances and goals by club, season and competition
Club	Season	League			National cup (Note: Includes Taça de Portugal, Belgian Cup, Greek Football Cup, Magyar Kupa)		League cup (Note: Includes Taça da Liga)		Continental		Other		Total	
Club	Season	Division	Apps	Goals	Apps	Goals	Apps	Goals	Apps	Goals	Apps	Goals	Apps	Goals
Leixões	2013–14	LigaPro	36	0	3	0	7	0	—		—		46	0
Estoril	2014–15	Primeira Liga	17	0	1	0	3	0	5 (Note: Appearance(s) in UEFA Europa League)	0	—		26	0
Estoril	2015–16	Primeira Liga	25	0	3	0	1	0	—		—		29	0
Estoril	2016–17	Primeira Liga	2	0	—		—		—		—		2	0
Estoril	Total		44	0	4	0	4	0	5	0	—		57	0
Gent	2016–17	Belgian First Division A	25	0	2	0	—		8	0	—		35	0
Gent	2017–18	Belgian First Division A	26	0	3	0	—		1	0	—		30	0
Gent	2018–19	Belgian First Division A	26	0	4	0	—		0	0	—		30	0
Gent	Total		77	0	9	0	—		9	0	—		95	0
PAOK	2019–20	Super League Greece	21	0	4	0	—		4 (Note: Two appearances in UEFA Champions League, two appearances in UEFA Europa League)	0	—		29	0
PAOK	2020–21	Super League Greece	9	0	0	0	—		4	0	—		13	0
PAOK	2021–22	Super League Greece	11	0	1	0	—		8 (Note: Appearances in UEFA Conference League)	0	—		20	0
PAOK	Total		41	0	5	0	—		16	0	—		62	0
Göztepe (loan)	2020–21	Süper Lig	20	1	0	0	—		—		—		20	1
Ferencváros	2021–22	Nemzeti Bajnokság I	9	1	3	0	—		0	0	—		12	1
Ferencváros	2022–23	Nemzeti Bajnokság I	21	1	1	0	—		13 (Note: Six appearances in UEFA Champions League, seven appearances in UEFA Europa League)	0	—		35	1
Ferencváros	2023–24	Nemzeti Bajnokság I	6	0	1	0	—		6 (Note: One appearance in UEFA Champions League, five appearances in UEFA Conference League)	0	—		13	0
Ferencváros	Total		36	2	5	0	—		19	0	—		60	2
Zalaegerszeg	2024–25	Nemzeti Bajnokság I	10	0	1	0	—		0	0	—		11	0
Diósgyőr	2025–26	Nemzeti Bajnokság I	17	0	3	0	—		0	0	—		20	0
Borac Banja Luka	2026–27	Bosnian Premier League	2	0	0	0	—		2	0	—		4	0
Career total			283	3	30	0	11	0	51	0	0	0	375	3

=== International ===
Appearances and goals by national team and year
National team	Year	Apps	Goals
Nigeria	2015	1	0
Nigeria	2016	1	0
Nigeria	2019	1	0
Total		3	0

== Honours ==
Ferencvárosi TC

- Nemzeti Bajnokság I: 2021–22, 2022–23, 2023–24
- Magyar Kupa: 2021-22

PAOK

- Greek Football Cup: 2020–21
