= Gábor Jurek =

Hungarian footballer (born 2004)

Personal information
- Date of birth: 4 June 2004 (age 22)
- Place of birth: Szikszó, Hungary
- Height: 1.83 m (6 ft 0 in)
- Position: Forward

Team information
- Current team: MTK Budapest
- Number: 39

Youth career
- 2014–2016: Encs
- 2016–2021: Diósgyőr

Senior career*
Years	Team	Apps	(Gls)
2020–2025	Diósgyőr II	24	(11)
2021–2026	Diósgyőr	106	(17)
2023	→ Kazincbarcika (loan)	3	(0)
2026	→ MTK Budapest (loan)	13	(4)
2026–	MTK Budapest	8	(7)

International career^{‡}
2019	Hungary U16	1	(0)
2022–2023	Hungary U19	13	(5)
2024	Hungary U21	6	(2)
2026–	Hungary	4	(0)
- * Club domestic league appearances and goals as of 20 September 2026 ‡ National team caps and goals as of 7 October 2026

Gábor Jurek (born 4 June 2004) is a Hungarian professional footballer, who plays as a forward for Nemzeti Bajnokság I club MTK Budapest, on loan from Diósgyőr, and the Hungary national team.

== Career ==
Jurek received a professional contract from Nemzeti Bajnokság I club Diósgyőr on 14 January 2021.

He played for Nemzeti Bajnokság II side Kazincbarcika in the 2023–24 season under a cooperation agreement.

== Career statistics ==
As of match played 19 January 2026

Appearances and goals by club, season and competition
Club	Season	League			National cup (Note: Includes Magyar Kupa)		Total	
Club	Season	Division	Apps	Goals	Apps	Goals	Apps	Goals
Diósgyőr II	2020–21	Nemzeti Bajnokság III	4	1	—		4	1
Diósgyőr II	2021–22	Nemzeti Bajnokság III	9	7	—		9	7
Diósgyőr II	2022–23	Nemzeti Bajnokság III	2	0	—		2	0
Diósgyőr II	2023–24	Nemzeti Bajnokság III	4	2	—		4	2
Diósgyőr II	2024–25	Nemzeti Bajnokság III	5	1	—		5	1
Diósgyőr II	Total		24	11	—		24	11
Diósgyőr	2021–22	Nemzeti Bajnokság II	16	3	1	0	17	3
Diósgyőr	2022–23	Nemzeti Bajnokság II	32	10	—		32	10
Diósgyőr	2023–24	Nemzeti Bajnokság I	23	2	3	0	26	2
Diósgyőr	2024–25	Nemzeti Bajnokság I	21	2	1	1	22	3
Diósgyőr	2025–26	Nemzeti Bajnokság I	14	0	1	0	15	0
Diósgyőr	Total		106	17	6	1	112	18
Kazincbarcika (loan)	2023–24	Nemzeti Bajnokság II	3	0	—		3	0
Career total			133	28	6	1	139	29

=== International ===
As of match played on 5 October 2026

Appearances and goals by national team and year
National team	Year	Apps	Goals
Hungary	2026	4	0
Total		4	0

== Honours ==
Diósgyőr

- Nemzeti Bajnokság II: 2022–23
