= Márk Mucsányi =

Hungarian footballer (born 2001)

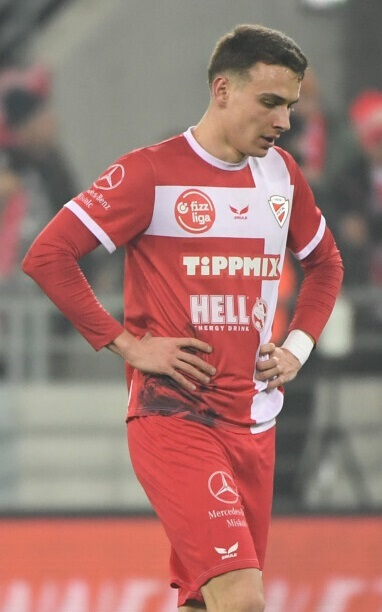
- Mucsányi playing for Diósgyőr in 2025

Personal information
- Full name: Márk Arion Mucsányi
- Date of birth: 16 November 2001 (age 24)
- Place of birth: Budapest, Hungary
- Height: 1.84 m (6 ft 0 in)
- Position: Midfielder

Team information
- Current team: Diósgyőr
- Number: 47

Youth career
- 2010–2013: Grund 1986
- 2013–2018: Honvéd
- 2018–2019: Újpest

Senior career*
| Years | Team | Apps | (Gls) |
| 2019–2025 | Újpest II | 86 | (25) |
| 2020–2025 | Újpest | 29 | (3) |
| 2022 | → Szentlőrinc (loan) | 11 | (0) |
| 2022 | → Szentlőrinc II (loan) | 2 | (2) |
| 2023–2024 | → BVSC (loan) | 20 | (5) |
| 2025– | Diósgyőr | 13 | (1) |
| 2025– | Diósgyőr II | 1 | (1) |
- * Club domestic league appearances and goals as of 30 May 2026

Márk Arion Mucsányi (born 16 November 2001) is a Hungarian professional footballer who plays as a midfielder for Nemzeti Bajnokság I club Diósgyőr.

== Career ==
=== Újpest ===
On 30 January 2021, Mucsányi played his first match for Újpest in a 3–2 lose against Mezőkövesd in the Nemzeti Bajnokság I.

On 3 May 2021, he won the 2021 Magyar Kupa final with Újpest by beating Fehérvár 1–0 at the Puskás Aréna.

His European debut came on 5 August 2021, after Junior Tallo suffered a thigh injury in the 35th minute of the opening leg against Basel in the qualifying phase of the Europa Conference League.

=== Szentlőrinc ===
Mucsányi was loaned out to Nemzeti Bajnokság II club Szentlőrinc for the second half of the 2021–22 season.

=== BVSC ===
On 6 September 2023, Mucsányi joined newly promoted Nemzeti Bajnokság II side BVSC on a one-year loan.

== Personal life ==
Mucsányi is the older brother of Miron Mucsányi. The two were former teammates at Újpest, including at its reserve team, Újpest II, before later playing together at Diósgyőr.

== Career statistics ==
As of match played 7 February 2026

Appearances and goals by club, season and competition
| Club | Season | League | | | Magyar Kupa | | Europe | | Total | |
| Club | Season | Division | Apps | Goals | Apps | Goals | Apps | Goals | Apps | Goals |
|---|---|---|---|---|---|---|---|---|---|---|
| Újpest II | 2018–19 | Megyei Bajnokság I | 15 | 4 | — | | — | | 15 | 4 |
| Újpest II | 2019–20 | Megyei Bajnokság I | 16 | 4 | — | | — | | 16 | 4 |
| Újpest II | 2020–21 | Nemzeti Bajnokság III | 23 | 4 | — | | — | | 23 | 4 |
| Újpest II | 2021–22 | Nemzeti Bajnokság III | 8 | 2 | — | | — | | 8 | 2 |
| Újpest II | 2022–23 | Nemzeti Bajnokság III | 20 | 8 | — | | — | | 20 | 8 |
| Újpest II | 2023–24 | Nemzeti Bajnokság III | 2 | 3 | — | | — | | 2 | 3 |
| Újpest II | 2024–25 | Nemzeti Bajnokság III | 2 | 0 | — | | — | | 2 | 0 |
| Újpest II | Total | | 86 | 25 | — | | — | | 86 | 25 |
| Újpest | 2020–21 | Nemzeti Bajnokság I | 5 | 0 | 2 | 0 | — | | 7 | 0 |
| Újpest | 2021–22 | Nemzeti Bajnokság I | 0 | 0 | 0 | 0 | 1 (Note: Appearance in UEFA Europa Conference League) | 0 | 1 | 0 |
| Újpest | 2022–23 | Nemzeti Bajnokság I | 3 | 0 | — | | — | | 3 | 0 |
| Újpest | 2023–24 | Nemzeti Bajnokság I | 0 | 0 | — | | — | | 0 | 0 |
| Újpest | 2024–25 | Nemzeti Bajnokság I | 21 | 3 | 2 | 1 | — | | 23 | 4 |
| Újpest | Total | | 29 | 3 | 4 | 1 | 1 | 0 | 34 | 4 |
| Szentlőrinc (loan) | 2021–22 | Nemzeti Bajnokság II | 11 | 0 | — | | — | | 11 | 0 |
| Szentlőrinc II (loan) | 2021–22 | Megyei Bajnokság I | 2 | 2 | — | | — | | 2 | 2 |
| BVSC (loan) | 2023–24 | Nemzeti Bajnokság II | 20 | 5 | 1 | 0 | — | | 21 | 5 |
| Diósgyőr | 2025–26 | Nemzeti Bajnokság I | 11 | 1 | 3 | 2 | — | | 14 | 3 |
| Diósgyőr II | 2025–26 | Nemzeti Bajnokság III | 1 | 1 | — | | — | | 1 | 1 |
| Career total | | | 160 | 37 | 8 | 3 | 1 | 0 | 169 | 40 |

== Honours ==
Újpest

- Magyar Kupa: 2020–21
