= Miron Mucsányi =

Hungarian footballer (born 2005)

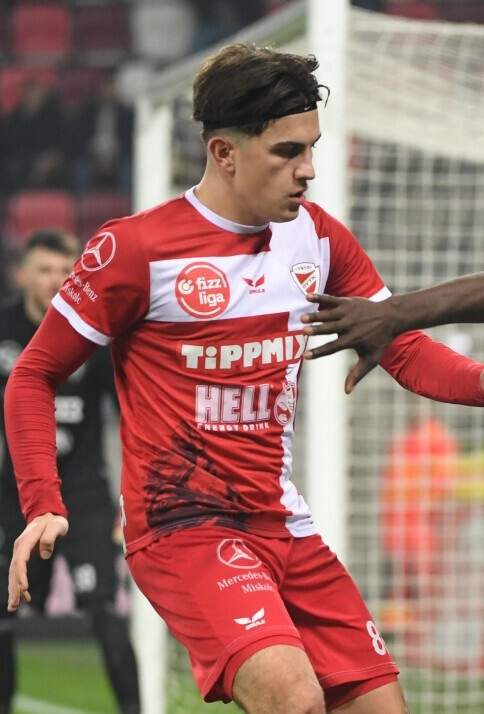
- Mucsányi playing for Diósgyőr in 2025

Personal information
- Full name: Miron Máté Mucsányi
- Date of birth: 14 October 2005 (age 21)
- Place of birth: Budapest, Hungary
- Height: 1.80 m (5 ft 11 in)
- Position: Midfielder

Team information
- Current team: Újpest
- Number: 15

Youth career
- 2011–2015: Grund 1986
- 2015–2022: MTK
- 2022–2023: Újpest

Senior career*
Years	Team	Apps	(Gls)
2023–	Újpest II	34	(2)
2024–	Újpest	4	(0)
2024–2025	→ BVSC (loan)	19	(1)
2025–2026	→ Diósgyőr (loan)	7	(0)
2025	→ Diósgyőr II (loan)	2	(0)
- * Club domestic league appearances and goals as of 31 January 2026

Miron Máté Mucsányi (born 14 October 2005) is a Hungarian professional footballer who plays as a midfielder for Nemzeti Bajnokság I club Újpest.

== Career ==
On 30 July 2025, Mucsányi moved to Nemzeti Bajnokság I club Diósgyőr on a season-long loan deal, following his brother Márk in joining the club. He was recalled by Újpest on 5 January 2026, with the announcement published on the club's official website, and returned to continue the winter preparation with his parent club.

== Personal life ==
Mucsányi is the younger brother of footballer Márk Mucsányi.

== Career statistics ==
As of match played 31 January 2026

Appearances and goals by club, season and competition
Club	Season	League			Magyar Kupa		Total	
Club	Season	Division	Apps	Goals	Apps	Goals	Apps	Goals
Újpest II	2022–23	Nemzeti Bajnokság III	2	0	—		2	0
Újpest II	2023–24	Nemzeti Bajnokság III	20	0	—		20	0
Újpest II	2024–25	Nemzeti Bajnokság III	11	2	—		11	2
Újpest II	2025–26	Nemzeti Bajnokság III	1	0	—		1	0
Újpest II	Total		34	2	—		34	2
Újpest	2023–24	Nemzeti Bajnokság I	4	0	0	0	4	0
Újpest	2024–25	Nemzeti Bajnokság I	0	0	—		0	0
Újpest	2025–26	Nemzeti Bajnokság I	0	0	—		0	0
Újpest	Total		4	0	0	0	4	0
BVSC (loan)	2024–25	Nemzeti Bajnokság II	19	1	—		19	1
Diósgyőr (loan)	2025–26	Nemzeti Bajnokság I	7	0	1	0	8	0
Diósgyőr II (loan)	2025–26	Nemzeti Bajnokság III	2	0	—		2	0
Career total			66	3	1	0	67	3
