= Dániel Gera =

Hungarian footballer (born 1995)

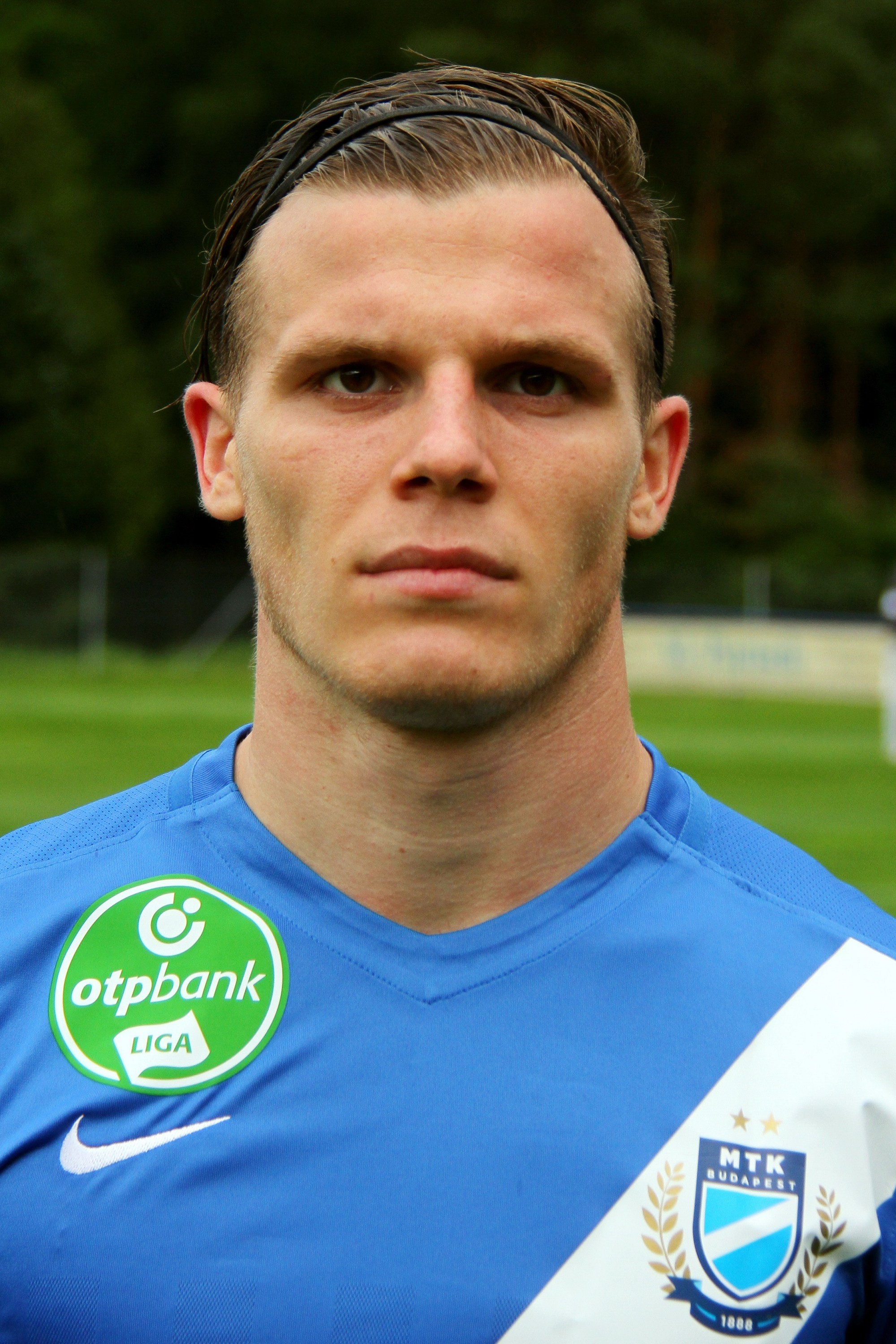
- Gera with MTK Budapest in 2016

Personal information
- Date of birth: 29 August 1995 (age 31)
- Place of birth: Budapest, Hungary
- Height: 1.81 m (5 ft 11 in)
- Positions: Midfielder; winger

Team information
- Current team: Persepolis
- Number: 33

Youth career
- 2005–2010: Vasas
- 2010–2011: Újpest
- 2011–2015: MTK Budapest

Senior career*
Years	Team	Apps	(Gls)
2015–2021	MTK Budapest	110	(16)
2021–2022	Ferencváros	7	(0)
2021–2022	→ Puskás Akadémia (loan)	19	(0)
2022–2026	Diósgyőr	92	(14)
2026–	Persepolis	5	(0)

International career^{‡}
2015–2016	Hungary U21	3	(1)
2024–	Hungary	4	(0)
- * Club domestic league appearances and goals as of 20 February 2026 ‡ National team caps and goals as of 19 November 2024

Dániel Gera (Hungarian pronunciation: [ˈdaːniɛl ˈɡɛːrɒ]; born 29 August 1995) is a Hungarian professional footballer who plays as a right winger for Persian Gulf Pro League club Persepolis and the Hungary national team.

== Club career ==
=== Ferencváros ===
On 8 January 2021, he was signed by Ferencváros.

=== Diósgyőr ===
On 31 August 2022, Gera signed with Diósgyőr. He was selected to be in the best team of the 2023–24 Nemzeti Bajnokság I season.

On 22 September 2024, he lost his consciousness in a Nemzeti Bajnokság I match against Újpest at the Diósgyőr Stadion.

=== Persepolis ===
On 24 January 2026, Gera joined Persian Gulf Pro League side Persepolis on a 18-month deal. He only played in five league matches (6 total) in his first season with Persepolis.

== International career ==
He debuted in the national team on 11 October 2024 against the Netherlands in the 2024–25 UEFA Nations League A group match. He entered the pitch as a substitute for Bendegúz Bolla in the 89th minute.

== Career statistics ==
=== Club ===
As of match played 26 June 2026

Appearances and goals by club, season and competition
Club	Season	League			National Cup		League Cup		Other		Total	
Club	Season	Division	Apps	Goals	Apps	Goals	Apps	Goals	Apps	Goals	Apps	Goals
MTK Budapest	2013–14	Nemzeti Bajnokság I	0	0	0	0	4	1	—		4	1
MTK Budapest	2014–15	Nemzeti Bajnokság I	2	0	0	0	3	0	—		5	0
MTK Budapest	2015–16	Nemzeti Bajnokság I	27	1	1	1	—		0	0	28	2
MTK Budapest	2016–17	Nemzeti Bajnokság I	17	2	1	0	—		3	0	21	2
MTK Budapest	2017–18	Nemzeti Bajnokság II	22	3	3	2	—		—		25	5
MTK Budapest	2018–19	Nemzeti Bajnokság I	25	6	2	2	—		—		27	8
MTK Budapest	2019–20	Nemzeti Bajnokság II	4	0	4	1	—		—		8	1
MTK Budapest	2020–21	Nemzeti Bajnokság I	13	4	0	0	—		—		13	4
Ferencváros	2020–21	Nemzeti Bajnokság I	7	0	1	0	—		0	0	8	0
Puskás Akadémia	2021–22	Nemzeti Bajnokság I	19	0	0	0	—		0	0	19	0
Diósgyőr	2022–23	Nemzeti Bajnokság I	16	4	0	0	—		—		16	4
Diósgyőr	2023–24	Nemzeti Bajnokság I	29	5	2	1	—		—		31	6
Diósgyőr	2024–25	Nemzeti Bajnokság I	31	4	0	0	—		—		31	4
Diósgyőr	2025–26	Nemzeti Bajnokság I	16	1	0	0	—		—		16	1
Diósgyőr	Total		92	14	2	1	—		—		94	15
Persepolis	2025–26	Persian Gulf Pro League	5	0	—		—		1	0	6	0
Persepolis	2026–27	Persian Gulf Pro League	0	0	0	0	—		—		0	0
Persepolis	Total		5	0	0	0	—		1	0	6	0
Career total			233	30	14	7	7	1	4	0	258	38

=== International ===
As of match played 19 November 2024

Appearances and goals by national team and year
National team	Year	Apps	Goals
Hungary	2024	4	0
Total		4	0
