= Vince Fekete =

Hungarian footballer (born 2005)

Personal information
- Date of birth: 9 July 2005 (age 21)
- Place of birth: Nyíregyháza, Hungary
- Position: Forward

Team information
- Current team: DEAC
- Number: 87

Youth career
- 2011–2015: Kótaj
- 2015–2017: Nyíregyházi Sportcentrum
- 2017–2019: Nyíregyháza
- 2019–2024: Diósgyőr

Senior career*
Years	Team	Apps	(Gls)
2022–2024	Diósgyőr II	52	(11)
2024–2025	Diósgyőr	5	(1)
2025	→ Putnok (loan)	11	(0)
2025–	DEAC	17	(7)

International career
2022	Hungary U18	1	(0)
- * Club domestic league appearances and goals as of 23 November 2025

Vince Fekete (born 9 July 2005) is a Hungarian professional footballer who plays as a forward for Nemzeti Bajnokság III club DEAC. He represented Hungary at youth level in a friendly against Uzbekistan U18 in 2022.

== Club career ==
=== Nyíregyháza ===
Born in Nyíregyháza, Szabolcs–Szatmár–Bereg, Fekete began playing with local Kótaj and Nyíregyháza's youth teams. In the summer of 2019 he won the 24th International Youth Football Tournament in Backnang as a member of the Nyíregyháza U14 team.

=== Diósgyőr ===
"After the match, I opened my phone and found lots of messages and calls waiting for me. At that moment, however, I could not and did not want to deal with them, so I tried to calm down a bit and rest. To be honest, an hour after the final whistle, I turned off my phone and left it that way until I traveled to the NB III match. Later, there were glitches and freezes on the phone because it struggled to process all the messages."

— Fekete commenting on his debut.

He later joined Diósgyőr, progressed through the upper age groups of the academy, and was a regular member of the club's Nemzeti Bajnokság III reserve team for three seasons.

He made his debut for the club on 20 April 2024, scoring a goal in a 5–3 home victory against Debrecen; the match also marked his first appearance and first goal in the Nemzeti Bajnokság I.

On 13 February 2025, DVTK announced that it had extended Fekete Vince's contract by one year, and that he will play for Nemzeti Bajnokság III club Putnok during the spring season. On 18 July, Diósgyőr announced on its official website that the club and Fekete had mutually agreed to terminate his contract.

=== DEAC ===
The following day, he joined DEAC, competing in the Nemzeti Bajnokság III.

== International career ==
On 5 September 2022, Fekete was selected to the Hungary under-18 side by Levente Babó for two friendly matches against Uzbekistan. He made his debut on 8 September in Budaörs, coming on as a substitute at half-time for Milán Klausz in a 2–1 victory.

== Career statistics ==
=== Club ===
As of match played 23 November 2025

Appearances and goals by club, season and competition
Club	Season	League			Magyar Kupa		Total	
Club	Season	Division	Apps	Goals	Apps	Goals	Apps	Goals
Diósgyőr II	2022–23	Nemzeti Bajnokság III	19	3	—		19	3
Diósgyőr II	2023–24	Nemzeti Bajnokság III	25	5	—		25	5
Diósgyőr II	2024–25	Nemzeti Bajnokság III	8	3	—		8	3
Diósgyőr II	Total		52	11	—		52	11
Diósgyőr	2023–24	Nemzeti Bajnokság I	3	1	—		3	1
Diósgyőr	2024–25	Nemzeti Bajnokság I	2	0	0	0	2	0
Diósgyőr	Total		5	1	0	0	5	1
Putnok (loan)	2024–25	Nemzeti Bajnokság III	11	0	—		11	0
DEAC	2025–26	Nemzeti Bajnokság III	17	7	4	2	21	9
Career total			85	19	4	2	89	21

=== International ===
Appearances and goals by national team and year
Team	Year	Total	
Team	Year	Apps	Goals
Hungary U18	2022	1	0
Career total		1	0
