= Godfrey Bitok =

Nigerian footballer

Personal information
- Full name: Godfrey Bitok Stephen
- Date of birth: 22 August 2000 (age 26)
- Place of birth: Jos, Nigeria
- Height: 1.85 m (6 ft 1 in)
- Position: Defender

Team information
- Current team: Isloch Minsk Raion
- Number: 13

Youth career
- Gee-Lec Football Academy

Senior career*
Years	Team	Apps	(Gls)
2019–2020	Isloch Minsk Raion	51	(7)
2021–2023	Jagiellonia Białystok	4	(0)
2021	Jagiellonia Białystok II	17	(0)
2022	→ Dinamo Tbilisi (loan)	13	(0)
2023	Volga Ulyanovsk	7	(0)
2023–2024	Diósgyőr	31	(1)
2024–2025	Gaziantep	2	(0)
2026	Irtysh	12	(0)
2026–	Isloch Minsk Raion	0	(0)

International career^{‡}
2019	Nigeria U23	3	(0)
- * Club domestic league appearances and goals as of 8 September 2026 ‡ National team caps and goals as of 21:02, 16 August 2024 (UTC)

Godfrey Bitok Stephen (born 22 August 2000) is a Nigerian professional footballer who plays as a left-back for Belarusian Premier League club Isloch Minsk Raion.

== Career ==
In January 2020, Bitok signed a new two-year contract with Isloch Minsk Raion, until the end of 2021.

In February 2021, Bitok joined Jagiellonia Białystok on a contract until the end of 2024. On 18 December 2021, Dinamo Tbilisi announced the year-long loan signing of Stephen. After his loan had concluded, he terminated his contract with Jagiellonia by mutual consent on 1 February 2023.

Bitok joined Gaziantep on 30 July 2024.

== Career statistics ==
As of match played 18 August 2024

Appearances and goals by club, season and competition
Club	Season	League			National cup		Continental		Other		Total	
Club	Season	Division	Apps	Goals	Apps	Goals	Apps	Goals	Apps	Goals	Apps	Goals
Isloch Minsk Raion	2019	Belarusian Premier League	24	5	3	0	—		—		27	5
Isloch Minsk Raion	2020	Belarusian Premier League	27	2	4	1	—		—		31	3
Isloch Minsk Raion	Total		51	7	7	1	—		—		58	8
Jagiellonia Białystok	2020–21	Ekstraklasa	3	0	0	0	—		—		3	0
Jagiellonia Białystok	2021–22	Ekstraklasa	1	0	0	0	—		—		1	0
Jagiellonia Białystok	Total		4	0	0	0	—		—		4	0
Dinamo Tbilisi (loan)	2022	Erovnuli Liga	13	0	1	0	0	0	—		14	0
Volga Ulyanovsk (loan)	2022–23	Russian Second League	7	0	0	0	0	0	—		7	0
Diósgyőr	2023–24	NB I	31	1	3	0	0	0	—		34	1
Gaziantep	2024–25	Süper Lig	2	0	0	0	0	0	—		2	0
Career total			108	8	8	1	0	0	—	—	119	9
