= Csaba Szatmári (footballer, born 1994) =

Hungarian footballer

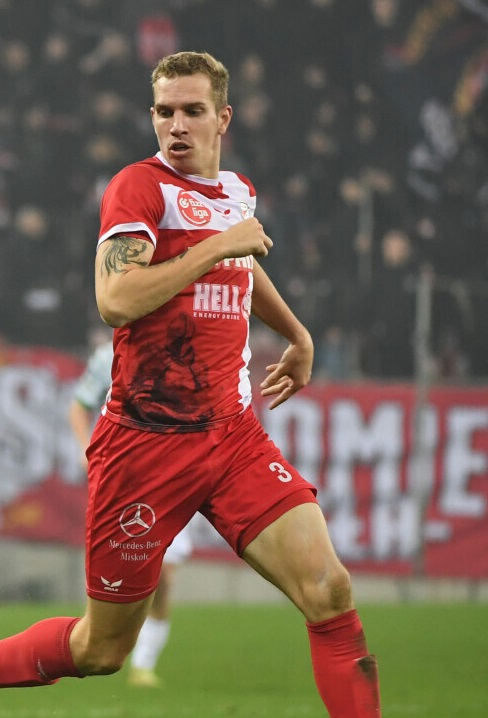
- Szatmári playing for Diósgyőr in 2025

Personal information
- Date of birth: 14 June 1994 (age 32)
- Place of birth: Debrecen, Hungary
- Height: 1.98 m (6 ft 6 in)
- Position: Defender

Team information
- Current team: Diósgyőr
- Number: 3

Youth career
- 2002–2012: Debrecen

Senior career*
Years	Team	Apps	(Gls)
2012–2021	Debrecen	112	(9)
2012–2013	→ Debrecen II	82	(2)
2013–2014	→ Létavértes SC ’97 (loan)		
2014–2015	→ Balmazújváros (loan)	8	(0)
2021–	Diósgyőr	137	(9)
	Diósgyőri VTK II.	5	(0)
- * Club domestic league appearances and goals as of 9 May 2026

Csaba Szatmári (born 14 June 1994) is a Hungarian professional footballer who plays as a defender for Nemzeti Bajnokság I club Diósgyőr.

== Career statistics ==
As of 9 May 2026

Appearances and goals by club, season and competition
Club	Season	League			Cup		League Cup		Europe		Total	
Club	Season	Division	Apps	Goals	Apps	Goals	Apps	Goals	Apps	Goals	Apps	Goals
Debrecen II	2011–12	Nemzeti Bajnokság II	2	0	0	0	—		—		2	0
Debrecen II	2012–13	Nemzeti Bajnokság II	15	0	0	0	—		—		15	0
Debrecen II	2013–14	Nemzeti Bajnokság III	21	1	0	0	—		—		21	1
Debrecen II	2014–15	Nemzeti Bajnokság III	12	1	0	0	—		—		12	1
Debrecen II	2015–16	Nemzeti Bajnokság III	16	0	0	0	—		—		16	0
Debrecen II	2016–17	Nemzeti Bajnokság III	12	0	0	0	—		—		12	0
Debrecen II	2020–21	Nemzeti Bajnokság III	4	0	0	0	—		—		4	0
Debrecen II	Total		82	2	0	0	0	0	0	0	82	2
Balmazújváros	2014–15	Nemzeti Bajnokság II	8	0	2	1	5	0	—		15	1
Debrecen	2013–14	Nemzeti Bajnokság I	0	0	1	0	7	0	0	0	8	0
Debrecen	2014–15	Nemzeti Bajnokság I	1	0	0	0	3	0	0	0	4	0
Debrecen	2015–16	Nemzeti Bajnokság I	2	0	5	0	—		0	0	7	0
Debrecen	2016–17	Nemzeti Bajnokság I	13	1	0	0	—		1	0	14	1
Debrecen	2017–18	Nemzeti Bajnokság I	28	1	6	0	—		—		34	1
Debrecen	2018–19	Nemzeti Bajnokság I	24	2	3	0	—		—		27	2
Debrecen	2019–20	Nemzeti Bajnokság I	23	2	0	0	—		4	1	27	3
Debrecen	2020–21	Nemzeti Bajnokság II	21	3	4	0	—		—		25	3
Debrecen	Total		112	9	19	0	10	0	5	1	146	10
Diósgyőri VTK	2021–22	Nemzeti Bajnokság II	34	2	1	0	—		—		35	2
Diósgyőri VTK	2022–23	Nemzeti Bajnokság II	35	3	1	0	—		—		36	3
Diósgyőri VTK	2023–24	Nemzeti Bajnokság I	28	2	3	0	—		—		31	2
Diósgyőri VTK	2024–25	Nemzeti Bajnokság I	17	2	2	0	—		—		19	2
Diósgyőri VTK	2025–26	Nemzeti Bajnokság I	23	0	2	0	—		—		25	0
Diósgyőri VTK	Total		137	9	9	0	0	0	0	0	146	9
Diósgyőri VTK II.	2023–24	Nemzeti Bajnokság III	1	0	—		—		—		1	0
Diósgyőri VTK II.	2025–26	Nemzeti Bajnokság II	4	0	—		—		—		4	0
Diósgyőri VTK II.	Total		5	0	0	0	0	0	0	0	5	0
Career total			344	20	30	1	15	0	5	1	394	22
