= Rudi Požeg Vancaš =

Slovenian footballer

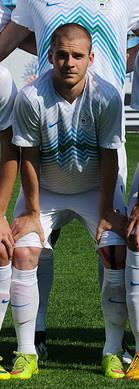
- Vancaš with Slovenia U21 in 2015

Personal information
- Date of birth: 15 March 1994 (age 32)
- Place of birth: Novo Mesto, Slovenia
- Height: 1.74 m (5 ft 9 in)
- Positions: Left winger; attacking midfielder

Team information
- Current team: Celje
- Number: 94

Youth career
- 2001–2011: Kolpa
- 2011–2012: Domžale

Senior career*
Years	Team	Apps	(Gls)
2010–2011	Kolpa	32	(13)
2011–2015	Domžale	98	(8)
2016–2019	Celje	98	(25)
2019–2022	Maribor	79	(15)
2022	Chornomorets Odesa	0	(0)
2022	→ Tobol (loan)	6	(1)
2022–2023	Koper	21	(2)
2023–2025	Diósgyőri	57	(10)
2025–	Celje	0	(0)

International career
2010	Slovenia U17	7	(0)
2011–2012	Slovenia U18	9	(1)
2012	Slovenia U19	7	(0)
2013	Slovenia U20	1	(0)
2013–2015	Slovenia U21	10	(1)
2018	Slovenia	1	(0)
2019	Slovenia B	1	(0)
- * Club domestic league appearances and goals as of 3 September 2025

Rudi Požeg Vancaš (born 15 March 1994) is a Slovenian professional footballer who plays as a midfielder for Slovenian PrvaLiga club Celje.

== Club career ==
On 25 April 2022, Tobol announced the signing of Požeg Vancaš, with his departure being confirmed on 30 June 2022 after his contract had expired.

== International career ==
Požeg Vancaš made his first and only appearance for the Slovenia national team in a November 2018 UEFA Nations League match away against Bulgaria.

== Honours ==
Celje

- Slovenian PrvaLiga: 2025–26
