= Karlo Sentić =

Croatian footballer (born 2001)

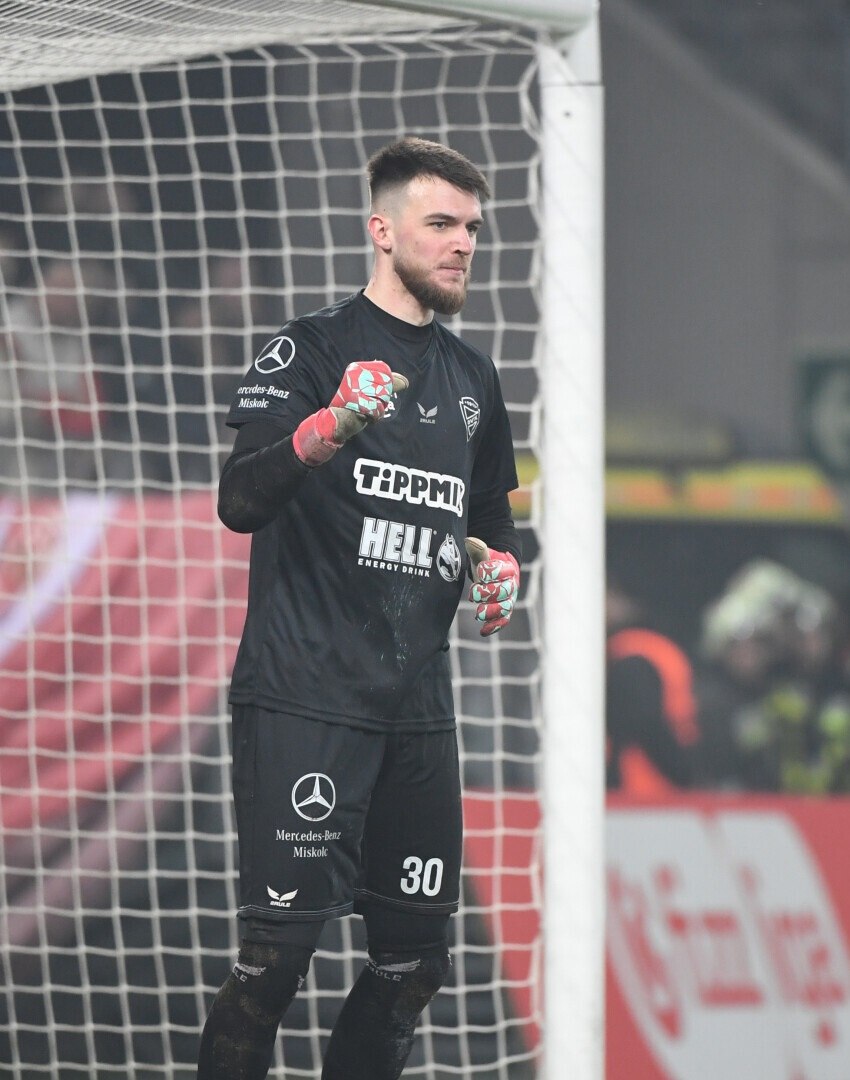
- Sentić playing for Diósgyőr in 2025

Personal information
- Date of birth: 3 June 2001 (age 25)
- Place of birth: Dubrovnik, Croatia
- Height: 1.93 m (6 ft 4 in)
- Position: Goalkeeper

Team information
- Current team: Diósgyőr
- Number: 30

Youth career
- 2010–2015: Nogometna akademija "Libertas"
- 2015–2020: Hajduk Split

Senior career*
Years	Team	Apps	(Gls)
2019–2021	Hajduk Split II	29	(0)
2021–2024	Hajduk Split	16	(0)
2021–2022	→ Varaždin (loan)	25	(0)
2023–2024	→ Diósgyőr (loan)	9	(0)
2024	→ Ordabasy (loan)	0	(0)
2024–	Diósgyőr	38	(0)

International career^{‡}
2018	Croatia U18	1	(0)
2019–2020	Croatia U19	4	(0)
2021–2022	Croatia U20	4	(0)
2022–	Croatia U21	0	(0)
2022–	Croatia U23	1	(0)
- * Club domestic league appearances and goals as of 30 May 2026 ‡ National team caps and goals as of 17 January 2023

Karlo Sentić (born 3 June 2001) is a Croatian professional footballer who plays as a goalkeeper for Nemzeti Bajnokság I club Diósgyőr.

== Club career ==
Sentić signed a professional contract with Hajduk in 2020 February until the summer of 2024. He was loaned to second league club Varaždin for the 2021–22 season where he won promotion with his club to the Croatian First Football League.

== International career ==
He has been capped for various Croatian youth national teams.

== Honours ==
Individual

- Nemzeti Bajnokság I Save of the Month: July–August 2025, October 2025, November 2025,
