= Bright Edomwonyi =

Nigerian footballer

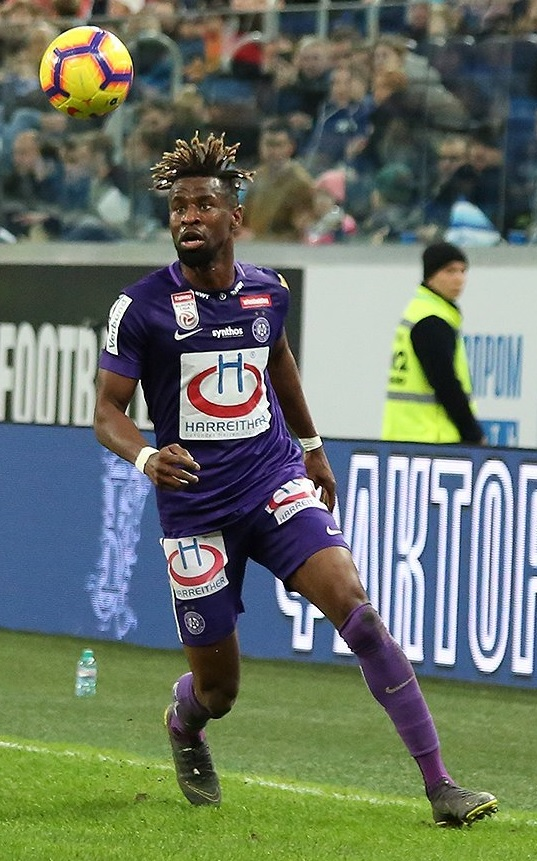
- Edomwonyi with Austria Wien in 2019

Personal information
- Full name: Bright Osagie Edomwonyi
- Date of birth: 24 July 1994 (age 32)
- Place of birth: Benin City, Nigeria
- Height: 1.87 m (6 ft 2 in)
- Position: Striker

Team information
- Current team: Nyíregyháza
- Number: 34

Youth career
- 2006–2007: Rock Football Academy
- 2007–2008: Faith Football Academy
- 2008–2009: Flexy Soccer Academy
- 2009–2012: Westerlo

Senior career*
Years	Team	Apps	(Gls)
2012–2013	Red Bull Salzburg	1	(0)
2013–2015	FC Liefering	11	(2)
2014	→ Wacker Innsbruck (loan)	10	(0)
2014–2015	→ TSV Hartberg (loan)	15	(9)
2015–2017	Sturm Graz	51	(11)
2017–2018	Çaykur Rizespor	22	(2)
2018	→ Sturm Graz (loan)	11	(3)
2018–2022	Austria Wien	57	(7)
2021	→ Atromitos (loan)	9	(0)
2022	→ Austria Wien II	8	(2)
2022–2023	Koper	26	(9)
2023–2025	Diósgyőr	60	(15)
2025–	Nyíregyháza	20	(5)
- * Club domestic league appearances and goals as of 30 May 2026

Bright Osagie Edomwonyi (born 24 July 1994) is a Nigerian professional footballer who plays as a striker for Hungarian club Nyíregyháza.

== Career ==
On 9 May 2018, Edomwonyi won the 2017–18 Austrian Cup with Sturm Graz, as his team defeated Red Bull Salzburg 1–0 in the final after extra time.

== Honours ==
Sturm Graz

- Austrian Cup: 2017–18
