= Ágoston Bényei =

Hungarian footballer (born 2003)

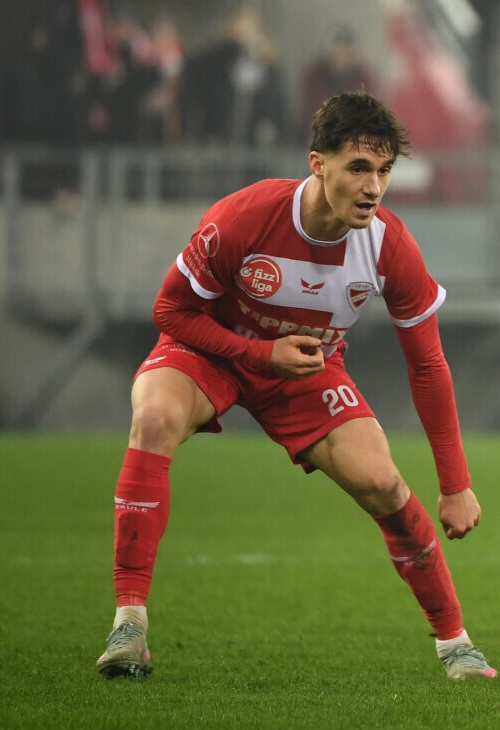
- Bényei playing for Diósgyőr in 2025

Personal information
- Full name: Ágoston András Bényei
- Date of birth: 3 April 2003 (age 23)
- Place of birth: Debrecen, Hungary
- Height: 1.77 m (5 ft 10 in)
- Position: Central midfielder

Team information
- Current team: Diósgyőr
- Number: 20

Youth career
- 2015–2021: Debrecen

Senior career*
Years	Team	Apps	(Gls)
2020–2022	Debrecen	29	(1)
2020–2022	→ Debrecen II	8	(1)
2022–	Diósgyőr	104	(10)

International career^{‡}
2021	Hungary U-18	1	(0)
2021–	Hungary U-19	5	(0)
2022–	Hungary U-21	11	(1)
- * Club domestic league appearances and goals as of 30 May 2026 ‡ National team caps and goals as of 27 March 2024

Ágoston András Bényei (born 3 April 2003) is a Hungarian professional footballer who plays for Nemzeti Bajnokság I club Diósgyőr.

== Career statistics ==
As of 15 May 2022

Appearances and goals by club, season and competition
Club	Season	League			Cup		Continental		Other		Total	
Club	Season	Division	Apps	Goals	Apps	Goals	Apps	Goals	Apps	Goals	Apps	Goals
Debrecen II	2020–21	Nemzeti Bajnokság III	3	0	—		—		—		3	0
Debrecen II	2021–22	Nemzeti Bajnokság III	5	1	—		—		—		5	1
Debrecen II	Total		8	1	0	0	0	0	0	0	8	1
Debrecen	2020–21	Nemzeti Bajnokság II	17	1	0	0	—		—		17	1
Debrecen	2021–22	Nemzeti Bajnokság I	15	0	0	0	—		—		15	0
Debrecen	Total		32	1	0	0	0	0	0	0	32	1
Career total			40	2	0	0	0	0	0	0	40	2
