= Szilárd Bokros =

Hungarian association football player

Personal information
- Date of birth: 28 March 2000 (age 26)
- Place of birth: Kistarcsa, Hungary
- Height: 1.83 m (6 ft 0 in)
- Position: Central midfielder

Team information
- Current team: Diósgyőr
- Number: 22

Youth career
- 2007–2011: Monor
- 2011–2017: Puskás Akadémia

Senior career*
Years	Team	Apps	(Gls)
2017–2022	Puskás Akadémia	9	(0)
2017–2018	→ Csákvár (loan)	33	(2)
2021–2022	→ Diósgyőr (loan)	23	(0)
2022–	Diósgyőr	67	(1)
2024–2025	→ Košice (loan)	16	(1)

International career^{‡}
2016	Hungary U-17	2	(1)
2018	Hungary U-18	1	(0)
2018–2019	Hungary U-19	7	(0)
- * Club domestic league appearances and goals as of 30 May 2026 ‡ National team caps and goals as of 26 March 2019

Szilárd Bokros (born 28 March 2000) is a Hungarian professional footballer who plays for Diósgyőr.

== Club career ==
On 28 June 2021, Bokros joined Diósgyőr on a season-long loan. On 4 July 2022, he moved to Diósgyőr on a permanent basis.

On 14 June 2024, Bokros joined Košice in Slovakia on a season-long loan.

== Club statistics ==
As of 19 May 2019

Appearances and goals by club, season and competition
Club	Season	League			Cup		Europe		Total	
Club	Season	Division	Apps	Goals	Apps	Goals	Apps	Goals	Apps	Goals
Csákvár	2017–18	Nemzeti Bajnokság II	33	2	3	0	–	–	36	2
Puskás Akadémia	2018–19	Nemzeti Bajnokság I	9	0	3	0	–	–	12	0
Career total			42	2	6	0	0	0	48	2
