= Vladimir Radenković =

Serbian footballer and manager (born 1978)

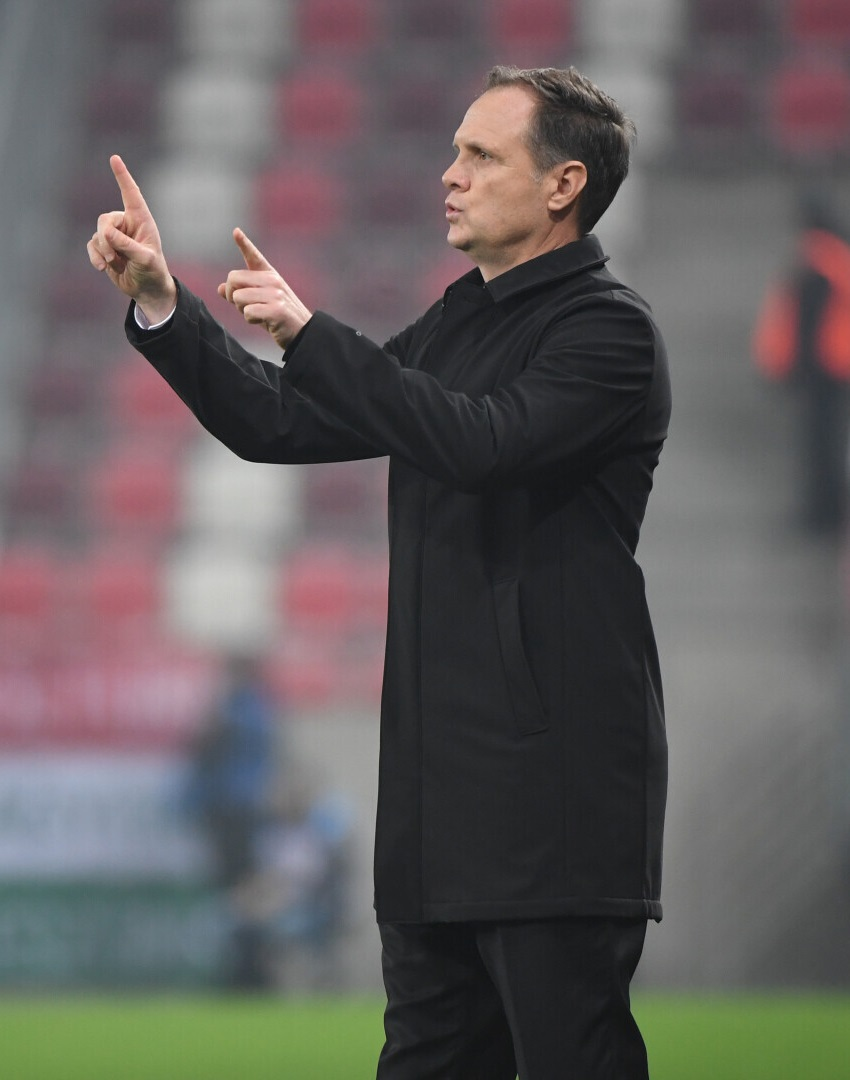
- Radenković managing Diósgyőr in 2025

Personal information
- Date of birth: 22 January 1978 (age 48)
- Place of birth: Belgrade, SFR Yugoslavia
- Position: Midfielder

Team information
- Current team: Diósgyőr (manager)

Managerial career
- Years: Team
- 2008–2010: Rad (assistant)
- 2010: Serbia U21 (assistant)
- 2013–2015: Diósgyőr (assistant)
- 2016–2017: Slovan Bratislava (assistant)
- 2019: Apollon Limassol (assistant)
- 2021: Radnički 1923
- 2021–2022: Maccabi Tel Aviv (assistant)
- 2022: Red Star Belgrade (assistant)
- 2024–2025: Diósgyőr
- 2025–: Diósgyőr

Vladimir Radenković (born 22 January 1978) is a Serbian football manager and former player who is currently the manager of Nemzeti Bajnokság I club Diósgyőr.

== Managerial career ==
=== Diósgyőr ===
On 14 February 2024, he was appointed as the manager of Nemzeti Bajnokság I club Diósgyőr. He debuted with a 4–0 victory over Fehérvár in the 2023–24 Nemzeti Bajnokság I season. At the end of the season, Diósgyőr finished in the seventh position; thus, avoided relegation.

In an interview with M4 Sport, he said that former Ferencváros manager, Dejan Stanković, misses his former club.

== Managerial statistics ==
As of match played 10 November 2024

Team	From	To	Record				
Team	From	To	G^{1}	W	D	L	Win %
Radnički 1923	9 June 2021	15 November 2021	17	4	2	11	23.53
Diósgyőr	14 February 2024	Present	14	6	4	4	42.86
Total			31	10	6	15	32.26

^{1} Only competitive matches are counted.

== Honours ==
Individual

- Nemzeti Bajnokság I Manager of the Month: November 2024
