= List of Diósgyőri VTK managers =

Diósgyőr-Vasgyári Testgyakorlók Köre is a professional football club based in Miskolc, Hungary.

== Managers ==
As of 6 March 2026.

Manager	Nationality	From	To	P	W	D	L	GF	GA	Win	Honours	Notes
Károly Jáhn	Hungary	1937										
Pál Teleki	Hungary	1937	1939									
Károly Csapkay	Hungary	1939	1942									
Dezső Wetzer	Hungary	1942	1943									
József Tomecskó	Hungary	1943	1944									
Jónás Móré	Hungary	1945	1946									
Sándor Barna	Hungary	1946	1947									
Jenő Detrich	Hungary	1947										
József Ádám	Hungary	1947	1949									
Sándor Felföldi	Hungary	1949										
József Tomecskó	Hungary	1950	1952									
Pál Szabó	Hungary	1952										
Pál Jávor	Hungary	1953	1955									
Béla Jánosi	Hungary	1953	1954									
Sándor Felföldi	Hungary	1956	1957									
János Steiner	Hungary	1957										
Pál Teleki	Hungary	1957	1958									
Gábor Kiss	Hungary	1958	1960									
Gyula Bodola	Hungary	1960	1961									
József Mágori	Hungary	1961										
Márton Bukovi	Hungary	1962	1963									
György Nagy	Hungary	1963	1965									
Kálmán Preiner	Hungary	1965	1966									
Pál Szabó	Hungary	1967										
Gyula Teleki	Hungary	1968										
Gusztáv Sebes	Hungary	1968										
Oszkár Szigeti	Hungary	1968										
Sándor Tátrai	Hungary	1969	1970									
József Tóth	Hungary	1970	1971									
Imre Mathesz	Hungary	1970	1972									
Kálmán Preiner	Hungary	1972	1974									
Géza Szabó	Hungary	1974	1981								1976–77 Magyar Kupa and 1979–80 Magyar Kupa	
István Deák	Hungary	1981										
Lajos Puskás	Hungary	1981	1983									
Ferenc Fekete	Hungary	1983	1984									
Imre Hajas	Hungary	1984										
László Bánkuti	Hungary	1984	1986									
Béla Gál	Hungary	1986										
György Száger	Hungary	1987	1988									
Gábor Petróczy	Hungary	1988	1989									
László Kiss	Hungary	1989										
Tibor Palicskó	Hungary	1989	1991									
Ladislau Vlad	Romania	1991	1992									
Barnabás Tornyi	Hungary	2 April 1992	30 June 1992	11	2	5	4	8	14			
Ishtvan Shandor	Ukraine	1992	1993									
Antal Szentmihályi	Hungary	1 January 1994	12 April 1994									
Vilmos Kálmán	Hungary	1994										
László Szepessy	Hungary	1994										
Ferenc Oláh	Hungary	1994	1995									
Zoltán Leskó	Hungary	1995	1996									
József Verebes	Hungary	2 April 1996	3 July 1996									
Barnabás Tornyi (2nd spell)	Hungary	7 July 1996	5 January 1999	55	24	13	18	94	71			
Gábor Szapor	Hungary	7 January 1999	14 April 1999	7	0	4	3	4	13			
Miklós Temesvári	Hungary	14 April 1999	31 December 1999	27	8	7	12	27	42			
Zoltán Varga	Hungary	11 January 2000	17 April 2000	9	1	1	7	5	17			
Géza Huszák	Hungary	2000										
János Pajkos	Hungary	5 February 2002	1 April 2003									
Károly Gergely	Hungary	3 July 2003	3 December 2003									
Tibor Őze	Hungary	7 January 2004	30 June 2004									
Lajos Détári	Hungary	2004		0	0	0	0	0	0			
József Kiprich	Hungary	27 July 2004	28 September 2004	6	0	0	6	6	14			
György Gálhidi	Hungary	28 September 2004	23 September 2005									
János Pajkos and Zoran Kuntić	Serbia	23 September 2005	18 October 2005	7								
János Pajkos (3rd spell)	Hungary	21 October 2005	9 June 2006	22	8	6	8	28	31	0.37		
János Csank	Hungary	11 July 2006	30 June 2007	30	11	5	14	40	52	0.37		
János Pajkos (4th spell)	Hungary	4 July 2007	29 September 2007	10	0	6	4	9	17	0		
Attila Vágó	Hungary	1 October 2007	25 September 2008									
Miklós Benczés	Hungary	2008										
Tibor Sisa	Hungary	15 October 2008	31 December 2008	5	3	1	1	5	5	0.6		
György Gálhidi	Hungary	1 January 2009	3 June 2009									
Zoltán Aczél	Hungary	17 July 2009	30 December 2009	17	3	3	11	18	31	0.18		
Barnabás Tornyi (3rd spell)	Hungary	4 January 2010	7 April 2010	6	0	1	5	3	11	0		
László Tóth	Hungary	8 April 2010	6 May 2010									
Miklós Benczés	Hungary	7 May 2010	2 April 2012	59	33	8	18	108	66	0.56		
Lázár Szentes	Hungary	2 April 2012	14 June 2012	8	3	0	5	11	15	0.375		
Tibor Sisa	Hungary	14 June 2012	22 November 2012	17	6	5	6	20	21	0.35		
Lázár Szentes (2nd spell)	Hungary	22 November 2012	17 April 2013	9	3	2	4	9	12	0.34		
Zoltan Kovac (caretaker manager)	Belgium	17 April 2013	3 June 2013	7	1	4	2	10	12	0.14		
Tomislav Sivić	Serbia	1 June 2013	28 April 2015	66	28	20	18	102	88	0.42	2013–14 Ligakupa	
Zoltán Vitelki (caretaker manager)	Hungary	28 April 2015	1 June 2015	5	4	1	0	9	3	0.8		
Balázs Bekő	Hungary	1 June 2015	14 December 2015	20	5	5	10	20	31	0.25		
Sándor Egervári	Hungary	29 December 2015	26 June 2016	14	5	3	6	17	17	0.36		
Ferenc Horváth	Hungary	30 June 2016	2 March 2017	26	11	3	12	37	44	0.42		
Zoltán Vitelki (interim)	Hungary	2 March 2017	12 March 2017	2	0	0	2	0	5	0		
Tamás Bódog	Hungary	9 March 2017	23 April 2018	46	18	11	17	65	61	0.39		
Fernando	Spain	23 April 2018	3 September 2019									
Tamás Feczkó	Hungary	4 September 2019	8 December 2020	45	18	6	21	61	63	0.4		
Gergely Geri	Slovakia	8 December 2020	7 January 2021	3	0	0	3	2	9	0		
Zoran Zekić	Croatia	7 January 2021	9 May 2021	20	7	5	8	19	24	0.35		
Elemér Kondás	Hungary	May 2021	8 April 2022	33	19	7	7	56	40	0.58		
Dragan Vukmir	Serbia	8 April 2022	23 August 2022	12	5	2	5	14	13	0.42		
Serhiy Kuznetsov	Ukraine	24 August 2022	31 January 2024	53	35	6	12	105	59	0.66		
Vladimir Radenković	Serbia	14 February 2024	19 February 2025	37	15	12	10	57	56	0.41		
Valdas Dambrauskas	Lithuania	26 February 2025	12 June 2025	12	3	4	5	15	21			
Vladimir Radenković (2nd spell)	Serbia	18 June 2025	6 March 2026	28	8	9	11	43	43			
Nebojša Vignjević	Serbia	6 March 2026	19 April 2026	6	0	1	5	4	18			
Péter Takács	Hungary	1 July 2026	1 September 2026	5	1	1	3	5	13			
Tamás Feczkó (2nd spell)	Hungary	8 September 2026										
