= History of Diósgyőri VTK =

Diósgyőr-Vasgyári Testgyakorlók Köre is a professional football club based in Miskolc, Hungary.

== 1910s ==
The preparations for the establishment of a sports club of the ironworks started at the end of the 1909. Vilmos Vanger, an elementary school teacher and a five-member committee asked the director of the iron works to approve the foundation of a sports club. On 6 February 1910, the Diósgyőr-Vasgyári Testgyakorlók Köre was founded at the premises of the factory. The red and white were chosen as the colours of the club. Vilmos Vanger was nominated as the first president of the club, while, Árpád Weisz became the vice-president. The secretary was Andor Erdélyi, while the finance director was István Hamza. The first coach of the club was Gyula Molnár.

The foundation of the club was approved by the Ministry of Interior therefore the club could participate in a Hungarian League match as early as 1912. In 1916 and 1918 the club won the Northern Hungarian championships. The club had played with all of the first league teams when it celebrated its 10th birthday.

== 1940s ==
The club first reached the top league of the Hungarian League in 1940. In the 1940–41 season Diósgyőr finished 6th as Diósgyőri MÁVAG. János Füzér and István Berecz scored 33 goals during the season.

In the following season, 1941–42 Diósgyőr finished 8th. During this season the club was able to beat Ferencváros by 3–2 for the first time in history. They also managed to reach the final of the 1942 Hungarian Cup, after beating Újpest 3–6, but ultimately lost 2–6 in the final, against FTC.

The results of the 1942–43 season was a bit worse since the club finished only the 12th, however, during this season they also could beat its Budapest rival Ferencváros 2–1 at home.

In the 1943–44 season the club finished 11th. Diósgyőr managed to reach the quarter-finals of the cup, losing 0–1 to Ferencváros.

The club were leading the table by matchday 6 of the 1944/45 season, but the league was interrupted as the Soviets were closing in on Hungary in January 1945, and the season ended without a champion declared.

After the war, the national league resumed after a one-year-long hiatus, in the 1945/46 season. DVTK were relegated at the end of the season. They spent the ensuing 4 seasons there, finishing 2nd (and 2 points off 1st place), 5th and 6th, before ultimately reaching promotion as champions in 1950.

The upper half of thetable at the end of the 1949/50 season of the Eastern Conference of the 2nd Division

#	Team	M	W	D	L	GD	Points
1	Diósgyőri Vasas	30	20	4	6	80 : 37	44
2	Kerámia SE	30	19	4	7	68 : 46	42
3	Ózdi Vasas SzIT TK	30	17	7	6	65 : 32	41
4	Miskolci MNVTE	30	17	7	6	82 : 54	41
5	Miskolci Lokomotív	30	17	5	8	77 : 41	39

== 1950s ==
DVTK started off the decade under the guidance of coach József Tomecskó, (he previously managed the club from 1943 until 1944) who managed the team for two years, and 101 league games, achieving an 8th-place finish with the club in their first season back at the 1st Division, and an 11th-place finish the next season.

From 1951 to 1956, the club's official name was Diósgyőri Vasas. Tomecskó parted ways with the club in 1952, and was replaced by Pál Szabó. The team finished the 1952 season in the relegation zone, being 3 points away from safety.

The club would be crowned champions of the Eastern Conference of the 2nd Division in the 1953 season, and were promoted again, finishing 8 points above Miskolci Honvéd.

Their first season back in the top-flight was a success, and the team finished 9th, with DVTK's all-time topscorer, Zoltán Dobó netting 16 goals.

At the end of the 1955 season, the club sat at 12th place, which meant DVTK would spend the next season in the second tier of Hungarian football. It would not take long for the team to be promoted again, as they only spent a single season in the 2nd Division, being crowned champions for a third time.

From the 1956 season onwards, the club's name was DVTK - Miskolc. Largely due to the work of coach Pál Teleki, who was part of Hungary's 1934 World Cup Bronze medal-winning squad, the team managed to finish 9th place for 2 consecutive seasons.

The team managed to finish the 1959/60 season 5th place, under the watch of Sándor Felföldi.

== 1960s ==
The club finished the 1960/61 season at the bottom of the league, managing only 3 wins out of 26 games, and were relegated again. The last game of the season was a memorable 4–7 defeat against fellow Eastern Hungarian side DVSC, who were also relegated. The club finished the next season 4th place in the 2nd Division, with 35 points.

The following season, under coach Márton Bukovi, DVTK were vying for a place back in the 1st Division again, and put on a great performance throughout the season, winning 19 of their 30 games, and losing only 3 times. DVTK defeated Budapest Spartacus 2–1 in front of 15,000 Diósgyőr fans on the last day of the season. The result meant, that the team would finish a mere one point above fellow Borsod-county club, Ózdi Kohász, and were promoted back to the top-flight.

This was the club's third 2nd Division title in 10 years. The club would spend the following 2 seasons in the 1st division, coached by György Nagy. They finished 11th, then 14th, which meant relegation, again, at the end of the 1964 season. The club performed under expectations, crashing out of the cup in the first round, after drawing 2–2 at Gyöngyösi Spartacus. The MLSZ had a rule in place, whereby in case of a draw, the team in the lower division would progress in the cup.

In the wake of relegation, Nagy was replaced by Kálmán Preiner, who wasted no time getting DVTK back to the first division, and achieved promotion via 2nd place first time trying, finishing 4 points behind Dunaújvárosi Kohász. DVTK also had a cinderella-like run in the 1965 Hungarian Cup, takung revenge on Gyöngyös, by beating them 1–6, and eliminating MTK and Újpest in the process. In the final, Győri-ETO proved to be too difficult of an opponent, and the Miskolc-based team got hammered 0–4, losing their second Hungarian cup final after 1942.

The club finished 9th in the 1966 season, with Preiner parting ways with the club. He was replaced by Pál Szabó, who returned to the club after 15 years, having previously managed the red and whites for a brief period of time in 1952.

The club achieved a 7th-place finish with Szabó in the 1967 season, with two DVTK players, Lajos Szurgent and András Horváth both scoring double digit goals, with 13 and 10 respectively. The club reached the round of 16 of the 1967 Hungarian cup, but were eliminated by Újpesti Dózsa. Szabó left at the end of the 1967 season, to be succeeded by Gyula Teleki.

Teleki only lasted 23 games at the club, and was sacked before the end of the season. His temporary replacement was Oszkár Szigeti, who just about managed to keep the team in the 1st Division, winning 2, and drawing 2 of his 7 games in charge.

DVTK was managed by Sándor Tátrai during the 1969 season. The team had an overall lackluster season, only being 4 points from safety at the end of the season, finishing 13th, thanks to two draws in their last 2 games.

== 1970s ==
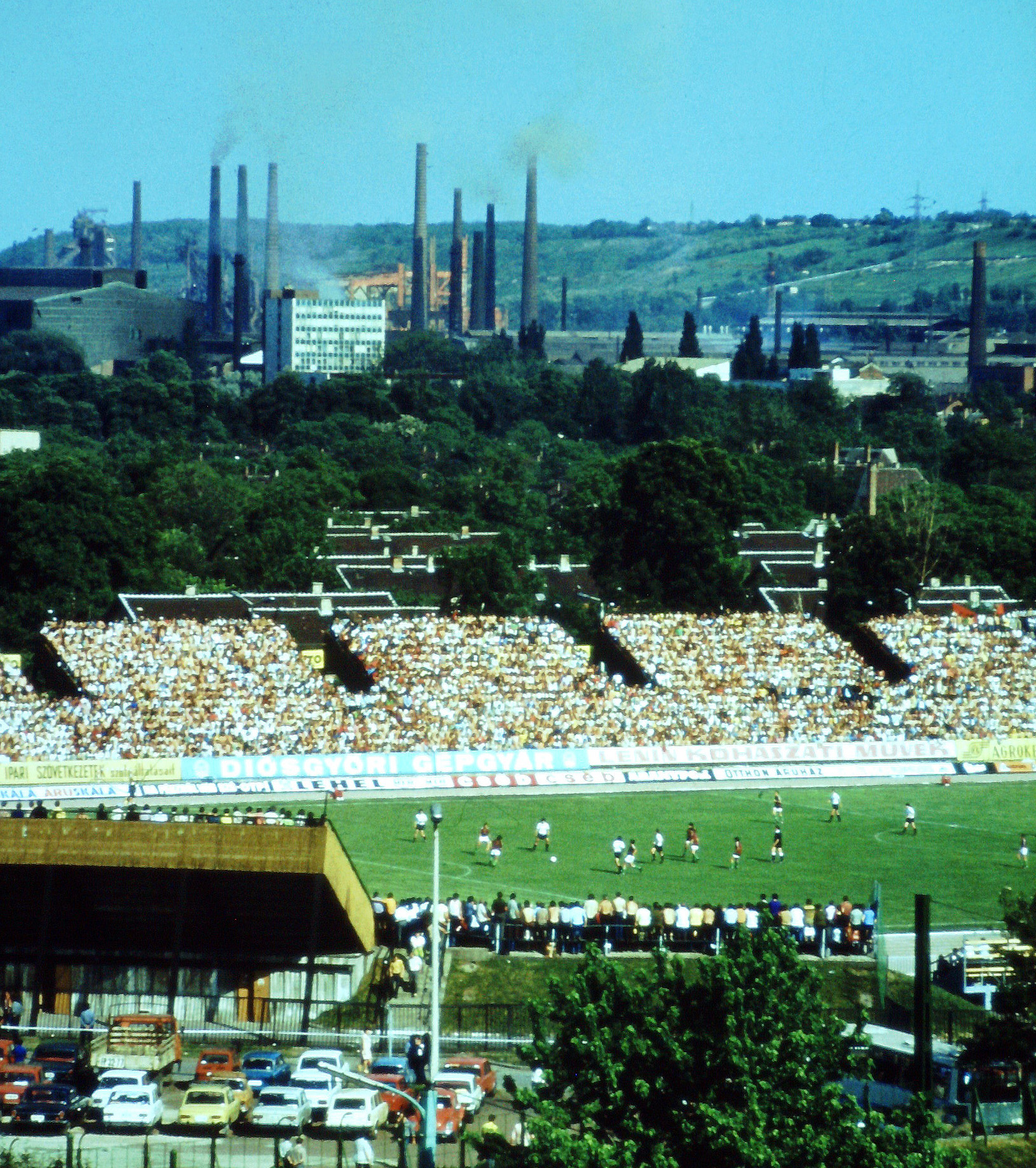
An international football match in 1979

For the spring part of the 1970 season, the Hungarian Football Federation decided to split the 16 top-flight teams into two groups of 8. DVTK got drawn to Group A, and achieved a 4th-place finish, winning 7 of their 14 games. The club came close to its third cup final, but lost in the semi-finals to Komlói Bányász.

After starting off the 1970/71 season poorly, and only managing to win 1 out of their first 5 games, DVTK sacked Tátrai, and replaced him with József Tóth for 2 games. The club's next permanent coach was Imre Mathesz, whose first game in charge was an away fixture against Csepel in October 1970. Mathesz managed to keep the club up, despite the sluggish start, achieving a 12th-place finish.

The club's seemingly never ending bad performance carried on to the next season. They were eliminated early from the Cup, by SZEOL and until matchday 23, DVTK had only won 3 games. Matheisz lost his job after a 0:3 away loss against Budapest Honvéd, on matchday 22. Despite this, the team, miraculously, didn't lose any of their remaining 7 fixtures, beat Csepeli SC, Rába-ETO, and Komlói Bányász, and managed to stay up under temporary head coach József Tóth.

DVTK started off the 1972/73 season under Kálmán Preiner, who had previously managed the club in 1965. Despite remaining in the fight to stay up until the very last day of the season, Szegedi EOL, who also needed a win to keep their top-flight membership, emerged victorious over DVTK, and an 87' minute strike from Ferenc Vass sealed the club's fate. The loss ended DVTK's uninterrupted 7-year stay in the top-flight, their longest up to that point. DVTK also crashed out of the cup in the round of 16, following a 5–2 loss against Vasas.

Despite the relegation, DVTK kept Preiner at the helm for the following season. Preiner managed to repay the club's instilled faith in him, and got the club promoted as champions, in a fairytale season, winning 19 of their games, and only losing 6, winning every single but three of their home games. Preiner got DVTK promoted first time asking, the same way he did in 1965.

The 1974/75 season was the start of Géza Szabó's legendary tenure as coach of DVTK. His first game in charge was a 0–1 loss at home against Pécsi Dózsa. DVTK fans could probably not even imagine the heights that he would go on to take the club. DVTK finished the season 11th place, winning 7 games. They also managed to get to the quarter-finals of the cup, where, after a 0–0 draw, were elimanated on penalties against Újpesti Dózsa.

The following season, there were no relegations from the 1st Division, and DVTK finished 14th, winning only 6 of their 30 games. In the cup, Diósgyőr progressed to the quarter-finals again, where they encountered Ferencváros. Despite winning the away leg 0–1, the club were elimanated on away goals, after losing the home leg 1–2. At the end of the 1976/77 season, the club finished 10th, winning 13 games. Other memorable moments of the season include DVTK finally beating Ferencváros at home, for the first time since 1966, in front of 25,000 people. Thanks to a brace from Ferenc Oláh, and a goal from Fekete, Diósgyőr managed to defeat Ferencváros 3:2 in October 1976.

Diósgyőr advanced from the groupstage of the 1976/77 Hungarian Cup, finishing ahead of Videoton, Máv-DAC, and Nagykanizsai Olajbányász SE. At the time, instead of a cup final, the cup was decided by the last four remaining teams playing each other in a round-robin format. In the final four, DVTK found themselves in a group with Ferencváros, Újpest and Vasas. DVTK won the first game, defeating Újpest 4–1, with Görgei scoring a hat-trick. The club was defeated by Ferencváros, but overcame Vasas, thanks to a late goal from György Tatár. FTC and DVTK finished on equal points, but due to better goal difference, DVTK won the 1976–77 season of the Hungarian Cup, for the first time in their history, therefore they qualified for the UEFA Cup Winners' Cup 1977-78 season. In the first round they encountered with the Turkish Beşiktaş J.K. The first leg was won by the Turkish club 2–0 at the İnönü Stadium, while Diósgyőr trashed Besiktas at home in Miskolc. In the second round Diósgyőr hosted the 1976–77 Yugoslav Cup winner Hajduk Split and they won the match by 2–1. However, in the second leg the Hungarian team lost to 2–1 and 4–3 on penalty shoot-out.

The 1977/78 season was Szabó's 4th season at DVTK, and he reached a 6th-place finish in the Championship with the club, winning 11 games. Despite going into the cup as the defending champions, DVTK were eliminated in the first round, after losing 9–8 on penalties at Tyukodi TSZ.

In the 1978–79 season of the Hungarian League the club reached its best result ever finishing on the third position of the table, ending the season with 19 wins, 8 points off champions Újpest. This was achieved despite only getting one win after their first 5 games. The team then went on a 7-week, and then 9-week unbeaten streaks at different points of the season. The first streak was broken by Békéscsaba, after a 5-0 hammering of Diósgyőr in December 1978. Remarkably, all five goals were scored by Sándor Vágási. In November 1978, DVTK defeated Ferencváros 1–0 in front of 25,000 people. This was DVTK's second consecutive victory over Ferencváros in the league, for the first time since 1959. The club also managed to hold Ferencváros to a 1–1 draw in the spring part of the season, thanks to an '82 minute equalizer from Tatár. DVTK would avenge the humiliating loss in Békéscsaba earlier in the season, defeating the eastern purples 5–0 in Miskolc. László Fekete scored a hat-trick. Due to the club's league position, they qualified for the 1979-80 UEFA Cup. On 19 September 1979 Diósgyőr was hosted by SK Rapid Wien at the Gerhard Hanappi Stadium and the match was won by the Hungarian club by 1–0. On 3 October 1979 the second leg was also won by the Hungarian club by 3–2. On 24 October 1979, Diósgyőr was hosted by the Scottish club, Dundee United F.C. at the Tannadice Park. The match was won by Diósgyőr. The second leg was won by Diósgyőr by 3–1 at home, therefore the Hungarian team could qualify for the third round of the cup. on 28 November 1979, in the third round Diósgyőr faced with the giant German club 1. FC Kaiserslautern and they lost 2–0 at home which resulted a very difficult return match for the Miskolc team. On 12 December 1979 Kaiserslautern beat Diósgyőr 6–1 which resulted the farewell for the team since the German club advanced on 8–1 aggregate.

Between November 1977 and May 1979, DVTK did not lose a single league game at the DVTK-stadium, winning 20 out of the 24 games in that timeframe. The streak was ended by Videoton on gameday 29 of the 1978/79 season, thanks to a goal from Ferenc Csongrádi. DVTK finished the 1979/80 season 12th place. High points of the season include the team beating eventual champions Budapest Honvéd 2:1, in November 1979, and capping off their season with a 3:0 victory against arch-rivals Ferencváros. They also won the club's second Cup triumph in three years time, namely the 1980 Hungarian Cup. DVTK knocked out Csepel, Üllői SK, and Komlói Bányász. In the final, they defeated Vasas 3–1, with goals from Kutasi, Fekete and Szalai. The final was held in front of 16,000 spectators, in Veszprém.

== 1980's ==
The club started off the 1980/81 season with a 0:2 loss away at their arch rivals, Nyíregyháza Spartacus. This also happened to be the first ever top-flight game in the history of Nyíregyháza, and was attended by 20,000 people at the Városi Stadion. DVTK started the season with 5 consecutive lost fixtures, and only won their first game on matchday 8 against MTK. Although a glimmer of hope lit up when DVTK won 3 consecutive games, Szabó, DVTK's winningest coach was gone after matchday 20, by which time the team had only won 4 games. His last match was a 0:0 draw against Ferencváros. In his third to last game, Szabó managed to seek revenge against historic rivals, Nyíregyháza, with a 1–0 win at the DVTK-stadium. With that, his last accolade became being the first DVTK coach to defeat Nyíregyháza in a top-flight game. DVTK finished the rest of the season with temporary head coach István Deák. In his 14 games in charge, he managed to steer the club away from the relegation zone, drawing 8 games, and winning 1. DVTK finished the season 14th, just one point above the relegation zone. The club managed to compensate their fans for the forgettable season, by reaching the final of the Cup for the second season in a row. They defeated Ferencváros 1–0, and Újpesti Dózsa 2–1 to advance to the final. In the Final, they encountered Vasas, the very same side who they had beaten in the final the season prior. DVTK lost to Vasas 0–1.

DVTK started off the new season with head coach Dr. Lajos Puskás. Although he won his first game in charge, at home against Pécsi MFC, the team did not fare much better this season, finishing 14th, winning 9 games, and losing 14, including a 0:3 loss away at Nyíregyháza in April 1982. The club advanced to the quarter-finals of the cup, where, they were eliminated by Békéscsaba on penalties.

DVTK finished the 1982/83 season 9th, winning 8 games. They were eliminated from the cup in the first round by Bélapátfalva. Mihály Borostyán scored 12 goals this season. DVTK legend György Tatár left the club at the end of the season, after representing Diósgyőr in over 240 league games. Tatár scored 5 goals in his final season.

Puskás left the club for Csepeli MVSC in 1983, and was replaced by Ferenc Fekete. His tenure lasted 18 games, of which he managed to win only two. DVTK finished off the season with Imre Hajas, who did not win a single game in charge, and DVTK were relegated at the end of the season, having accumulated a record low 12 points. They crashed out of the cup in the round of 16, against Olefin SC. The last game of the season was a dubious 2–7 defeat against Nyíregyháza, who just so happened to need to win their last game by 5 goals in order to stay up. After having been convinced that the match was fixed, MLSZ ruled that both clubs would start their next season with a -4 point deficit. The decision was baffling, especially since the champions of the 1983/84 season, Budapest Honvéd also played a suspicious game that week, a 6–6 draw against Volán, who needed a draw to stay up. Volán were also relegated because of this game, however, Honvéd were only penalized with having 5 points taken away from their 1983/84 results. Honvéd would have needed 6 points to be taken away to not be champions, so they were still crowned the winners of that season.

DVTK replaced Hajas with László Bánkúti. DVTK finished the 1984/85 season 4th in the 2nd Division, being 8 points away from promotion, despite winning all but 1 of their last 9 games. DVTK advanced to the semi-final stage of the 1984/85 Hungarian Cup, by defeating Győri Eto 2–1, but lost 0–1 to Budapest Honvéd.

The team started off the next season well, only losing 2 of their first 16 games. Unfortunately, a string of defeats followed, which led the club to sack Bánkúti, with his last game being a 5–0 defeat by Váci Izzó. He was replaced by Béla Gál from Matchday 24 onwards, but the club ended up finishing 4th. In the round of 16, Eger knocked DVTK out of the cup after a beating them 1–0.

Gál remained the coach for the start of the 1986/87 2nd Division season. The club started off the season horribly, only winning 3 of their first 19 games. György Szláger took charge of the team for the remainder of the season, and DVTK only managed to stay up thanks to a 0–0 draw against Nagykanizsai Olajbányász on the last day of the season, finishing 14th. The club progressed to the round of 32 of the cup, where they were eliminated by Kecskemét.

DVTK started off the 1987/88 season relatively well, winning 15 out of their first 29 games. Unfortunately, they lost 6 of their last 9 games, which was only enough for an 11th-place finish, 1 point behind rivals Nyíregyháza. The club were eliminated from the cup early again, after a 1–0 loss at Lehel SC, in the second round. Szláger left the team at the end of the season, and his successor was chosen to be Gábor Petróczy. He lasted 27 games, winning 8 of them. DVTK finished the 1988/89 season under László Kiss. He achieved an 8th-place finish with the club. The team had to say goodbye to the Hungarian cup early again, as they were eliminated by Kaba in the round of 64. For the start of the 1989/90 2nd Division season, DVTK hired Tibor Palicskó to be the new head coach.

== 1990s ==
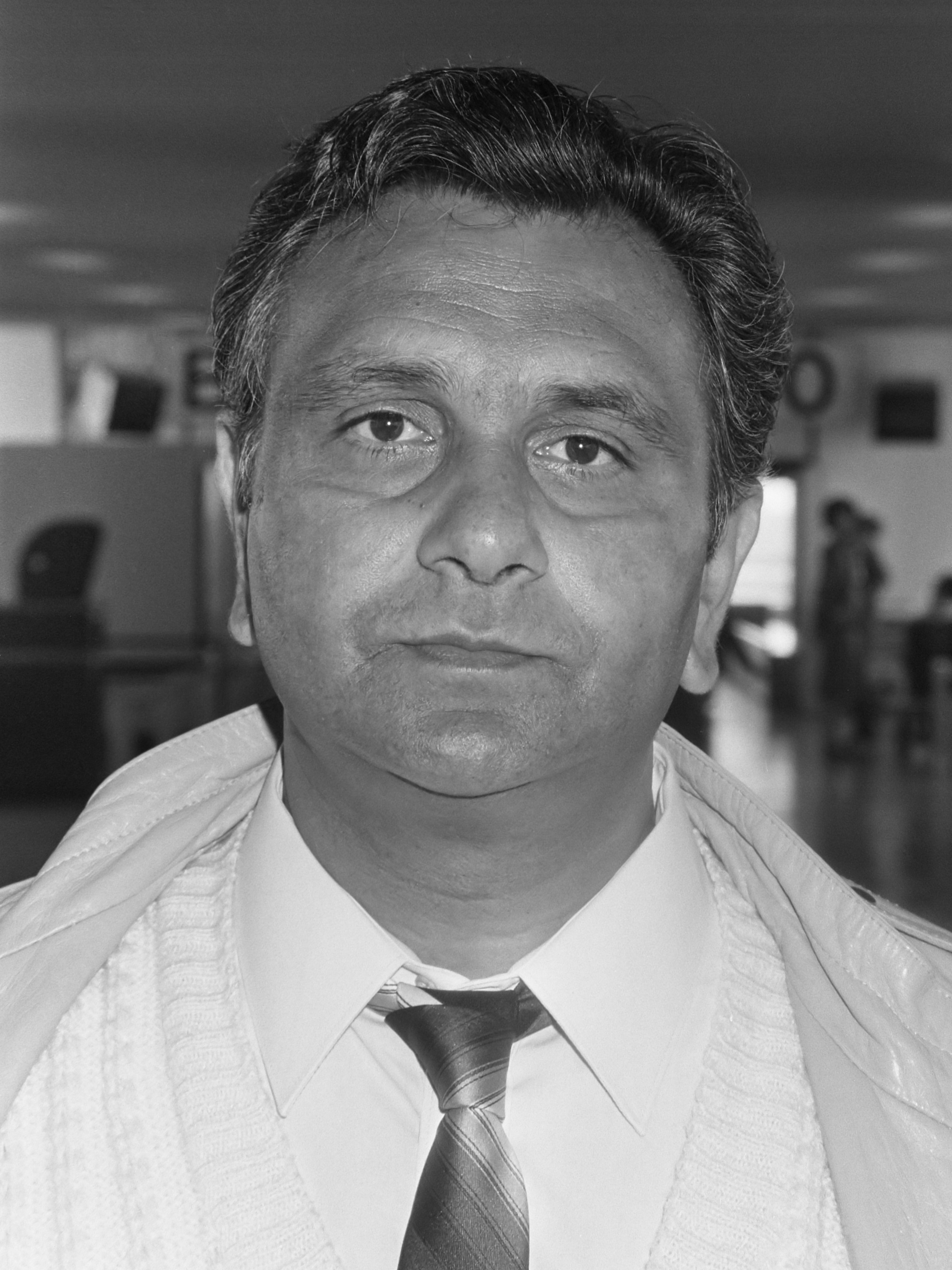
József Verebes a.k.a. "The magician" managed Diósgyőr in 1996

Palicskó started off his journey at the club with a 1:1 draw at BVSC. The club did not manage to win any of their first 8 games, however, the initial bad performances did not manage to dwindle the board's trust in Palicskó. The club's fortunes would eventually turn around during the season, with the team at one point winning 7 consecutive games between October 1989 and March 1990, and eventually finishing 5th, winning 12 games. The club crashed out of Cup in the round of 64, losing 1–0 to Újfehértó.

Palicskó stayed as head coach for the 1990/91 season. The club started off the season in a manner that reflected that possibility of a top-flight promotion was on the cards, not losing any of their first 14 games. They ended up winning 17 of their games, only losing 3, and did not lose a single game in front of their home crowd. This was still only enough for a 2nd-place finish, meaning automatic promotion went to BVSC-Zugló, who finished one point above DVTK. For a place in the 1st division for the 1991/92 season, DVTK played a 2-legged playoff game against Szegedi SC, who had finished 13th in the 1st Division, and were forced to play a play-off fixture. After winning the away leg at Szeged 1–2, DVTK managed to keep their aggregate lead over the home leg as well, managing a 1–1 draw in front of 20,000 spectators, thus returning to the top-flight after 7 years. After the game ended, Palicskó famously uttered, Where is happiness nowadays? In Borsod, In Miskolc, In Diósgyőr, mostly at the DVTK-Stadium. The club also reached the quarter-finals of the cup, after pulling off a surprise victory over Budapest Honvéd, but were eliminated by Paks, losing 0–1 on aggregate. Palicskó left after the play-off victory, and was replaced by László Vlád.

The fall of communism in Hungary also affected the club as any other clubs in the country. In 1992 the club's name was changed into Diósgyőri FC. Vlád László started off DVTK's 1st Division return with a 0:2 loss at home at the hands of Siófoki Bányász SE. This would foreshadow Vlád's tenure at the club, which only lasted 19 games, of which he only managed to win 4. He was sacked after a 2–2 draw at Vasas' Illovszky Rudolf Stadium in March 1992. The club finished the rest of the season under head coach Barnabás Tornyi, who could only guide the team to a 14th finish, meaning they would have to partake in a two legged play-off, in order to stay members of the 1st Division for the 1992/93 season. DVTK's opponents were BKV Előre, whom they defeated in the away leg 1–2, and also managed to win the home game, thanks to a late goal by DVTK legend Zoltán Vitelki. In the cup, the team had a forgettable run, crashing out in the first round against Baktalórántháza.

DVTK started off the 1992/93 season under new headcoach István Sándor. Despite starting off the season well, managing to defeat arch-rivals Nyíregyháza for the first time since 1983, thanks to a goal by László Kiser, and only losing 3 of their first 13 games, from matchday 14 onwards, the club managed two wins in 16 games. During the latter end of the season, the club suffered heavy defeats, by arch-rivals Ferencváros, who beat them 0–4 in May 1993 in Miskolc, in front of 20,000 people and also by eventual champions Budapest-Honvéd, who defeated DVTK 1–5 on the last day of the season. DVTK were forced to play a play-off fixture for the third season in a row, this time against EMDSZ Soproni LC. DVTK beat them in the first game 1–0 at the DVTK-Stadium, however, lost the return leg in a humiliating manner, with the final result being 5–0 to Sopron. After just two seasons back in the elite of Hungarian football, the club was relegated again. Similarly, the club did not perform better in the Hungarian cup either, losing to Mátészalka in the second round.

Despite the relegation, the club kept Sándor at the helm, who managed to collect 8 wins out of the club's first 15 games, only losing one in the process. However, the club still chose to replace him after matchday 15, which was a 1–2 win at 3. Kerületi TVE. Antal Szentmihályi became the temporary head coach, lasting 6 games, winning two and losing three, including one loss against Nyíregyháza. The new head coach was chosen to be Vilmos Kálmán, who was in charge for 2 games matchday 22 onwards. His replacement was László Szeppesy, who was the club's 4th coach that season. He only managed to win one game during his tenure, thus was sacked after the penultimate game of the season, with Kálmán being recalled. The club finished the season 4th, being 6 points away from promotion. The club were eliminated from the cup in the third round, after losing 0–1 to MTK.

For the start of the 1994/95 2nd Division Season, Ferenc Oláh was appointed as the new head coach. He had formerly represented DVTK as a player between 1970 and 1984, and appeared in 468 league games, the most of any DVTK player. DVTK only lost 4 games by matchday 26, and were vying for promotion. Unfortunately, they finished the season with 4 consecutive losses (including a 0–1 home loss against Nyíregyháza), and only achieved a 7th-place finish.

DVTK started off the 1995/96 season by avenging their loss of the last day of the previous season by Tiszavasvári SE, beating them 3–0. Oláh resigned after matchday 11, by which time the team had won all but three of their games. His temporary replacement was Zoltán Leskó, whose tenure lasted for 7 games, 5 of which the team won. DVTK finished the remainder of the season under The Magician József Verebes. He took the team to a 3rd-place finish, which meant DVTK would play in a 2-legged play-off tie for the 4th time in 5 years. Their opponents were Fehérvár Parmalat FC. The first leg was played in Fehérvár, and DVTK took the lead early on, due to a goal from Pintér. Fehérvár managed to equalize in the 64th minute, by Dvéri, then proceeded to take the lead 7 minutes later, with a goal from Monye. Fehérvár ended up winning the game, 2–1. They also took the lead in the return game, in the 18th minute, thanks to Ferenc Horváth. DVTK quickly turned the game around, thanks to two quick goals from Tóth and Kotula. Fehérvár settled the game in the 97th minute, with an equalizer from Takács, banishing DVTK to at least one more year in the 2nd Division. Over 15,000 DVTK fans attended the game. Verebes and the club parted ways after the play-offs.

DVTK started off the 1996/97 season under Barnabás Tornyi, who had previously managed the club in 1992. Tornyi took the club to the round of 64 of the cup, where they would be eliminated by Paks again. Despite Diósgyőr winning the first game, the side from Western Hungary overcame the deficit, and won the return leg 3–0. With 2 games to go, DVTK had won 14 games, and were looking like a side with serious promotion ambitions. On the penultimate day of the season, DVTK were playing away at their biggest rivals, Nyíregyháza Spartacus, who were also in the race to get promoted. Nyíregyháza won the game with a controversial penalty being converted by István Kovács in the 92nd minute. DVTK finished the season 2nd, 4 points behind automatic promotion. This meant the club was preparing for its 5th play-off tie in 6 years. DVTK played 3. Kerületi TVE. The club from Óbuda won the first game at home 1–0, however, DVTK won the return leg at home 2–0, thanks to an own goal by Tamás Szamosi, and a goal by Attila Farkas. DVTK were promoted to the first division again. 14,000 people attended the game in Miskolc. For the second leg, In order to strike fear in their opponents', players of DVTK famously wore red and white face-paint, akin to that of Native Americans.

The team started off their return campaign in the 1st Division, with a 5-1 hammering of Kispest-Honvéd, in front of 16,000 DVTK fanatics. After eliminating Ferencváros 2–1 in the cup, with a late goal from Domokos, DVTK were eliminated in the round of 16, by eventual winners MTK. The team would finish the season 11th, with 12 victories, including a famous 4–1 defeat of Videoton on the last day of the season, with DVTK cult-hero, 49 year old goalkeeper, György Veréb being subbed on in the second half. Veréb would save a penalty, and keep a clean sheet in what would be his final game for DVTK. Veréb had been part of the DVTK squad since 1968.

The autumn part of the 1998/99 season was a memorable one for the team. On matchday 4, DVTK defeated Újpest 1–3 at the Megyeri Arena, their first victory over the purple & whites since 1966, and their first away victory over UTE since 1954. This was also Újpest's first defeat in the league since November 1997.

The team's first defeat came in an incredible 9-goal thriller, at Győri ETO. Győr took the lead early on, but DVTK turned it around, and were leading by the 31st minute 1–2. Somogyi equalized for ETO, but 2 minutes before the half-time whistle, Téger took the lead for DVTK. By the 64th minute, it looked as though DVTK had put the game to bed, due to Egressy reinforcing the lead, making it 2–4. DVTK kept their 2-goal lead all the way until the 82nd minute. ETO went on to score 3 unanswered goals in 7 minutes, thus winning the game, 5–4. In September 1998, DVTK defeated Budapest-based 3. Kerületi TVE (the team they had beaten in the play-offs to return to the 1st Division) 5–1, with Sándor Kulcsár scoring a hat-trick. Kulcsár would also score a brace within 2 minutes against Ferencváros at the Üllői Úti Stadion, in a game which DVTK won 3–4, thanks to an 84th-minute strike by Tibor Szabó. This was DVTK's first away win against Ferencváros since 1972. DVTK became the third Hungarian team of the '90's decade to score four goals at Ferencváros' ground, after MTK an Győri-ETO. A couple of weeks later, in November 1998, DVTK managed to defeat Videoton away, thanks to another late goal, by Egressy, scored in the 86th minute. The winning streak came to an end on the 21st of November, when DVTK suffered a 3–1 defeat as guests of their biggest rivals, Nyíregyháza Spartacus. Tornyi's second tenure as DVTK head coach came to an end during the winter break of the season, after he accepted an offer to coach the U-21 national team of Hungary. He was replaced by Gábor Szapor. During the spring part of the season, DVTK's performances would take a hit, only winning their first game in April. During this time, the club would suffer heavy defeats, such as a 5-1 blowing by DVSC-Espona (who would also beat DVTK in the quarter-finals of the cup) and a 4–0 loss at MTK. For the last 1/3 part of the season, Miklós Temesvári took charge of the team. On the penultimate day of the season, DVTK sought revenge against rivals Nyíregyháza, thanks to a goal from Egressy in the 42nd minute. The club finished the season 8th, with their loan-hero, Egressy, scoring 17 goals. He would leave the club for Budapest Honvéd in 2000.

Temesvári stayed as head coach for the start of the 1999/00 season. He was sacked after matchday 17, due to poor results, losing 7 of their games, and winning only 4, with his last game in charge being a 6:0 defeat by Dunaferr SE in December 1999. The club would suffer yet another earlier-than-expected exit at the cup, at the hands of Fót. Temesvári's replacement was Zoltán Varga.

== 2000s ==
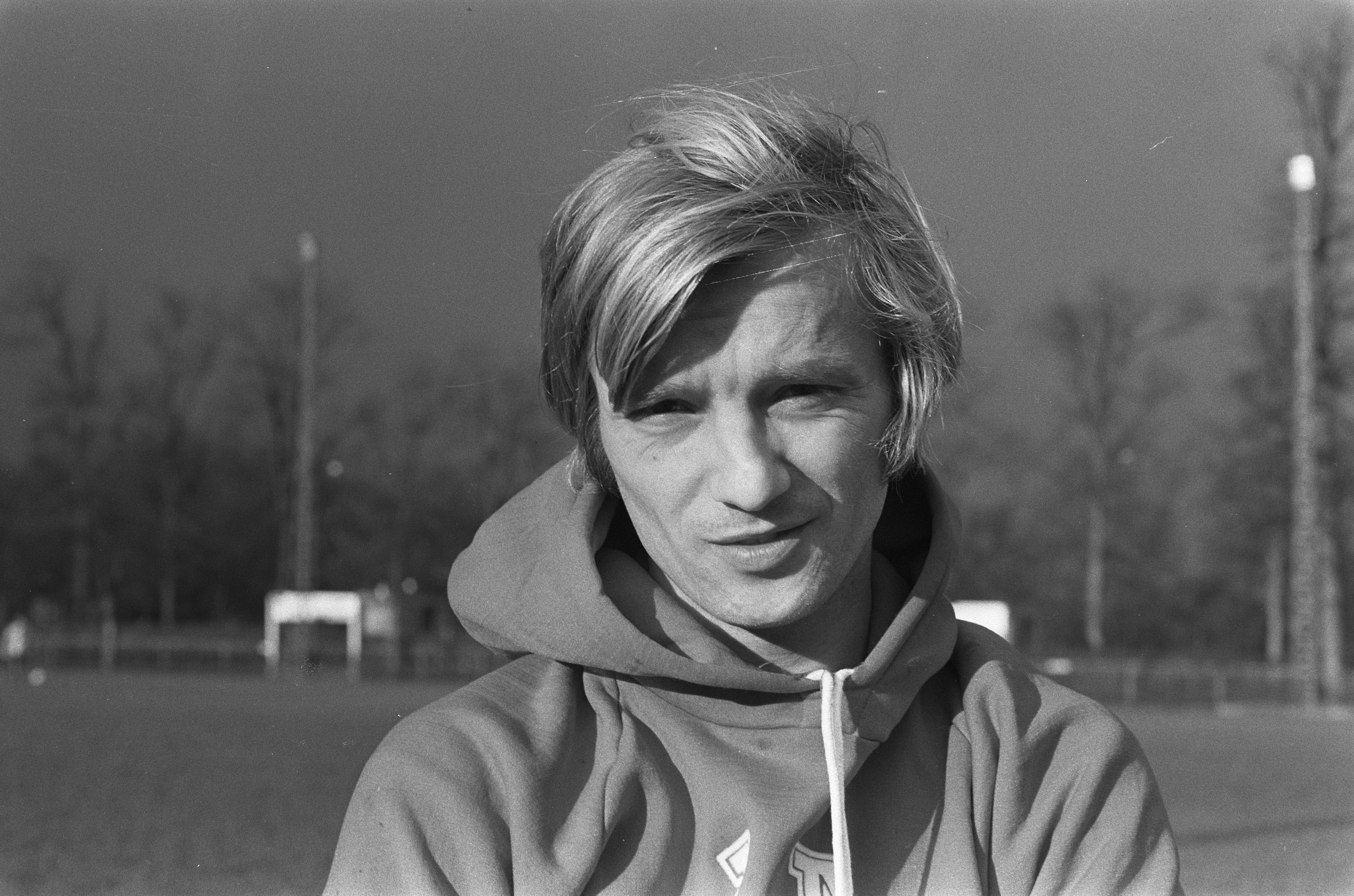
Ferencváros legend, Zoltán Varga managed Diósgyőr in 2000

DVTK started off the new millennium with a 2–0 loss against arch-rivals Nyíregyháza (known at the time as Nyírségi Spartacus FC). Varga only won one game when in charge, and took the team on a 4-week consecutive losing streak. He was promptly sacked, and replaced by Géza Huszák with 6 games to go. He fared even worse than his predecessor, not winning a single game. For the last game of the season, DVTK hosted champions, Dunaferr SE. By that time, it had become clear, that the club would spend the following season in the 2nd Division, and fans of DVTK entered the pitch in a fit of rage, rendering the game to be suspended by the referee. The Federation awarded all 3 points to Dunaferr. At the end of the season, due to financial problems, the club disbanded for a short period of time.

After the bankruptcy the fans founded again the Diósgyőri VTK and enlisted it into the Hungarian League. The club spent its first season in the seventh division. However, thanks to a merger with Borsod Volán SE the club could play in the third division in the 2000–01 season of the Hungarian League.

Although the club could not get promoted into the second division, Diósgyőr could play in the second division again in the 2001–02 season since they merged with Bőcs who already got promoted to the second division. For the start of the season, Géza Huszák returned to manage the club for 19 games. DVTK finished the season under János Pajkos, with whom they achieved a 2nd-place finish, 6 points behind champions Békéscsaba, whom they also played against in the last game of the season, a 1–1 draw. The team got to the third round of the cup, where they were defeated 3–0 by Szekszárd.

In the second league financial problems also hindered the success of the club and finally the club went bankrupt again. However, the Diósgyőri VTK 1910 Limited company was founded and later purchased the right to play in the second division from Monor. Pajkos was sacked after matchday 22 of the 2002/03 season, and was replaced by Attila Vágó. DVTK finished the season 15th, narrowly avoiding relegation, and suffering heavy defeats towards the end of the season, such as a 5–1 defeat by Újpest FC-Fót, and a 0–3 defeat by rivals Nyíregyháza. The club had a lukewarm run in the cup as well, having to settle for a third round elimination by Siófok.

The team started off the 2003/04 season under new head coach Gergely Károly. The campaign started off with bad results, losing 5–1 to Budapest-Honvéd on the first day of the season, and only winning one in their first 6 games. Károly's tenure ended after 17 games, winning 8 of them. The club finished the spring part of the season with Tibor Őze. DVTK finished the season 4th place. Due to the 1st Division being expanded from 12 to 16 teams, starting in the 2004/05 campaign, MLSZ decided to give 5 promotion spots in the 2nd division, which meant DVTK would be playing top-flight football once again. MLSZ initially refused the club the licence needed to play in the 1st Division, however, due to a merger with Siófok KC Ltd, who had moved to Miskolc, DVTK were able to play 1st Division football.

DVTK started off their return campaign in the first division under József Kiprich, who, as a player, had played for Feyenoord for 6 years, and also spent 2 seasons at Apeol Nicosia. Unfortunately, his tenure only lasted 6 games, which included a 2–1 loss at Ferencváros. His replacement was György Gálhidi. By matchday 22, DVTK had only won 7 games (including a 5-1 dismantling of Budapest-Honvéd in April), and were in dire straits. The club only lost 1 of their remaining 8 games, winning 4 of them. On Matchday 24, DVTK were hosting Fehérvár FC, and needed a win. By the time of the 70-minute mark, DVTK were 0–1 down, however, thanks to a brace from Egressy within 3 minutes, and a last-minute strike from Tisza, DVTK managed to win the game, 3–1. On Matchday 27, DVTK were playing an away fixture against their biggest rivals, Nyíregyháza, who were also embroiled in a relegation battle. The home team took the lead in the 51st minute by Zoltán Vasas, who would reinforce his club's lead just 9 minutes later, making it 2–0. In the 78th minute, Tisza scored another late goal, to put DVTK back in the game. It looked like the Miskolc fanatics would have to settle for a defeat at the Városi Stadion, however, Marius Siminic equalized for DVTK in the 88th minute, with the game ending 2-2. The club finished the season 9th, 11 points above the relegation zone. Nyíregyháza were relegated at the end of the season, which meant, that for the first time in the 21st Century, DVTK were a Division above their biggest rivals. In the Hungarian Cup, Dunaújváros spelled the end of DVTK's run, defeating them 2–1 in the second round.

The club started off the 2005/06 with a 0–1 loss against Újpest due to an own goal from Mogyorósi. Gálhidi was fired after a 5–0 loss at Pécsi-MFC on Matchday 6. His replacement would be the coach duo of Zoran Kuntic and the returning János Pajkos. Pajkos' second tenure's first game on DVTK's bench was an away fixture at Ferencváros in October 2005. The team held off the green giants, and managed an impressive 1–1 draw, thanks to an 81st-minute equalizer from Tisza. The team finished the season 8th, with newly signed star, Ferenc Horváth finding the back of the net 10 times. Unfortunately, due to the owners finding his salary hard to pay, Horváth only played at the club for a single season. Headcoach Pajkos also left at the end of the season, to manage Győri- ETO.

The club started the 2006/07 season under Hungarian coaching legend János Csank. Csank had already had an illustrious coaching career behind him, having won the national championship in 1994, and 2001, in charge of Vác and Ferencváros, respectively. He had also managed the Hungary national team between April 1996 and November 1997. DVTK defeated Újpest in the first game of the season, however, went on a 5-game losing streak between August and September. The club managed to hold defending champions DVSC to a 1–1 draw, thanks to a goal by Attila Simon in the 81st minute. In November 2006, DVTK defeated Győri ETO 4–3, in a game where DVTK were in front 3 consecutive times (due to goals from Elek, Foxi & Vitelki), but only managed to win through a 74th-minute strike from Viktor Farkas. DVTK also defeated Újpest FC at Megyeri Stadium 0–3, where the club had only collected 2 league wins since 1955. DVTK finished the season 9th, winning 11 of their games. The club reached the semi-finals of the cup, for the first time since 1985, after eliminating Sopron and Zalaegerszeg. Their opponents would be fellow Eastern-Hungarian side, Debrecen. DVSC won the first leg, with a late goal from Sidibe. Diósgyőr put up a formidable fight in the return leg, and equalized twice, but the 2–2 draw was not enough for the club to progress. Csank left at the end of the season, and was replaced by the returning János Pajkos.

The club started the 2007/08 season with a 1–2 defeat to defending champions DVSC, who had just won their third consecutive national title. Pajkos resigned after matchday 10, after losing at home to REAC 0–1, after conceding in the 90th minute from Krisztián Nyerges. Pajkos lost 5 games, while in charge. His replacement was Attila Vágó, whose first stint as DVTK's coach came in 2003. Vágó's first game in charge was a victory at FC Sopron. The club's longest losing streak during the season lasted 4 games. One of which was a 1–4 defeat to Újpest FC in November 2007, with three former DVTK players, namely Tisza, Sadjo & Foxi all scoring against the club. The club failed to win a single game between October and March. Their first league win of the 2008 calendar year came against Kaposvár Rákóczi, whom DVTK came back against from 0–1 down, with goals from Sebők Vilmos, and Gonzalo Cardozo. For the latter, this was his only top-flight goal scored in Hungary. In April 2008, despite being 1–3 up by the 50th minute, DVTK played a 5–5 draw at Rákospalotai EAC, with Diósgyőr player Homma Kazuo becoming the first ever Japanese player to score a brace in the Hungarian League. The club finished the season 13th, having the lowest number of wins out of all the clubs which stayed up that season, with 5 wins overall. After eliminating Eger and Mezőkövesd in the cup, DVTK drew 1–1 to Kazinczbarcika at home, and went on to lose the second leg 3–1, crashing out at the round of 16.

Vágó remained in charge for the beginning of the 2008/09 season, but only lasted 8 games. His last game on DVTK's bench was a humiliating 6–0 defeat at Győri ETO. This was the third time since May 2007, that Győr defeated DVTK by a 4-goal margin, or more, battering them 4–0 on the last day of the 2006/07 season, and also defeating them 5-1 a couple of months later. Vágó's replacement was temporary head coach Miklós Benczés, who was in charge for 2 games, which included an away derby against Nyíregyháza. DVTK went 0–2 up by the 16th minute, with goals from Milicic and Tóth, however, their eastern rivals recovered from the 2-goal deficit, with the game ending 2-2. Tibor Sisa managed the club for 5 games. Despite losing 4–1 to BTC Siófok, he took the club on a 4-week winning streak, including a 1–2 win at defending and eventual champions DVSC. This victory marked the first ever time DVTK won a league game in Debrecen, and it was not repeated until 2024. DVTK were eliminated from the cup in the fourth round, after losing 1–0 to Makó. For the spring part of the season, György Gálhidi returned to DVTK, having previously managed the club in the 2004/05 season. The club finished the season 12th, with Gálhidi winning 4 games out of the 15 he was in charge.

DVTK started off the 2009/10 season with Zoltán Aczél. The first game of the season was an upset victory over defending champions DVSC, thanks to a penalty converted in the 93rd minute by Ákos Lippai. Unfortunately, DVTK would only win two more games in their next 15 fixtures, (including a victory at Ferencváros, which was awarded to DVTK because fans of Ferencváros caused the game to be interrupted, when DVTK was leading 1–3), with Aczél being fired after a 4–0 loss at MTK in November 2009.

== 2010s ==
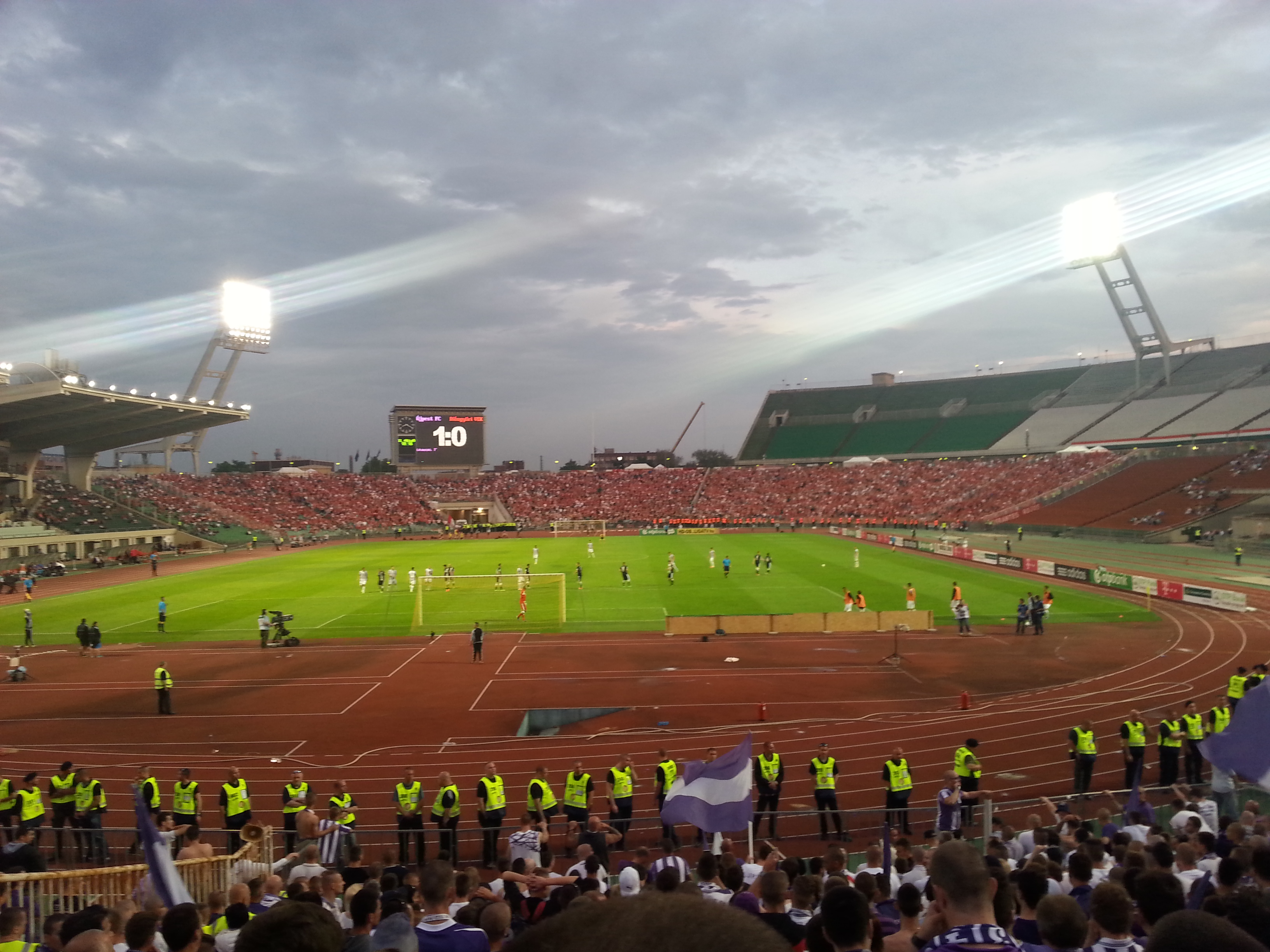
Diósgyőr in the 2014 Magyar Kupa Final against Újpest FC at the Puskás Ferenc Stadion on 25 May 2014

Aczél was replaced by Barnabás Tornyi, who started his third tenure as DVTK coach. His third stint did not go anywhere near as well as the first two, with Tornyi losing all but one game in charge. His replacement, and the club's third coach of the season was László Tóth. Tóth finally managed to break DVTK's winless run between October 2009, and April 2010, defeating Pápa 3–0. However, his tenure was also short-lived, being fired after only 5 games in charge, with his last game being a 0–1 defeat to Nyíregyháza. DVTK finished the season under Miklós Benczés. On matchday 27, after losing 1–0 to Paks, it had become mathematically impossible for the club to stay up, meaning the centenarian celebrations were spoilt by the fact that the club was relegated after 6 consecutive top-flight seasons.

Benczés stayed as coach of the club for the 2010/11 2nd Division season. Despite starting off with a draw with REAC and a defeat at Békéscsaba, DVTK ended up winning the Division, at one point going on a 14-game winning streak between November 2010 and May 2011. DVTK also did the "double" over their hated rivals, Nyíregyháza Spartacus, who were also vying for promotion that season, defeating them 2–1 in Miskolc, and 2–3 at the Városi Stadion. The latter was attended by over 8,000 people. On Matchday 27, off of the back of a 14-game winning streak, DVTK lost 1–0 to Borsod-county rivals Mezőkövesd thanks to a penalty converted by Csaba Vámosi, who had previously represented DVTK in four different stints. Despite the defeat, DVTK were crowned champions, thanks to Nyíregyháza also losing 1–0 at Vác. Diósgyőr won the 2010–11 season of the second division of the Hungarian league and it was promoted after spending only one season in the second league. During the team's last home game of the season, the DVTK-stadium was packed to the brim, as the already promoted team demolished Cegléd 6–1. Granát scored a hat-trick, while Menougong achieved a brace. DVTK fanatics took to downtown Diósgyőr after the game, and filled the streets in a display of raw passion very rarely seen in the 2nd division of Hungarian football. Surprisingly enough, Diósgyőr and Nyíregyháza had a totally equal goal difference, with both teams having scored 66 goals, and conceded 23 throughout the campaign.

Table of the 2010/11 Eastern Conference of the 2nd Division
#	team	matches	W	D	L	GD	PTS
1	Diósgyőri VTK	30	22	2	6	66 - 23	68
2	Mezőkövesd-Zsóry SE	30	19	5	6	47 - 20	62
3	Nyíregyháza Spartacus FC	30	18	6	6	66 - 23	60

This was the sixth time in the club's history, (1945, 1953, 1956, 1965, 1973/74, and 2010/11) to be promoted immediately after relegation.

Benczés remained head coach of the club, and they started their return campaign with a 4-1 battering of Zalaegerszeg. This was followed up by a draw at Ferencváros, with DVTK cult-hero José Luque scoring the equalizer in the 68th minute. This was the first time since 2005 that DVTK managed to come away from Ferencváros' stadium with a point. Luque would also contribute to DVTK's victory against BFC Siófok with a late goal. DVTK had not beaten Siófok at home since 1992, and quickly went 0–1 down, but George managed to equalize shortly before the one hour mark, with Luque scoring the winning goal in the '80th minute. In September 2011, striker Tibor Tisza returned to the club, after having left for Újpest in 2006. In November 2011, DVTK hosted Budapest-based rivals, Ferencvárosi TC, with over 11,000 people in attendance. FTC won the game, 2–3. This was the second highest attended game of the entire season, only falling short of the FTC-UTE derby's attendance, in October of the same year. Benczés was sacked after Matchday 22, due to a string of poor results in the spring period, and was replaced by Lázár Szentes. Szentes won 5 of his 8 games in charge, and DVTK finished the season 7th, their highest finish since 1988.

For the next season, DVTK appointed Tibor Sisa as head coach, who had previously been in charge of the club in 2009. On 27 July 2012 Diósgyőr started 2012–13 Nemzeti Bajnokság I season with a 2–1 victory over Újpest FC. On 12 September 2012 Hungarian international team player and former Genoa C.F.C. player Gergely Rudolf signed a three-year contract with Diósgyőr, and would score 6 goals in his first season. Sisa was sacked after matchday 15, and Szentes was recalled to the club. His tenure only lasted 6 games, and the club's sole win under him came against Videoton, with both half of DVTK's Spanish duo, Fernando and Luque scoring within 10 minutes of each other, in April 2013. The club finished the season under Zoltán Kovac, achieving a 10th-place finish. Luque and Fernando left the club at the end of the season, after being given an incredible reception and a standing ovation at their final game, against Pápa.

The club started off the 2013/14 season under new head coach, Sivic Tomislav. Sivic had a rocky start to the season, only managing to collect 3 points out of his first 4 games. However, this was anything but a sign of things to come. The club would win all of their subsequent 7 games, which included two 2-0 victories over Újpest and Budapest Honvéd, and a 5-0 dismantling of Mezőkövesd. This period was immediately followed up by an 8-game streak, where the club was unable to win a game. The club finished the league 5th, their second highest ever finish. DVTK managed to progress to the semi-finals of the League Cup, being victorious over Mezőkövesd, and SZTK in the process. In the semi-final, after going down 1-0 early in the game, they beat Ferencváros 1–2 in Budapest, thanks to goals from Álves and Bacsa. Furthermore, they managed to keep their aggregate lead in the home leg, and contained FTC to a 1–1 draw. In the Final, they managed to beat Videoton FC 2–1, thanks to two early goals from Kostic ('8) and Bacsa ('12). DVTK hoisted their first domestic cup since 1980. Simultaneously, the club also progressed to the final of the Hungarian Cup, eliminating Cigánd SE, Videoton, Lombard Pápa and DVSC in the process. DVTK beat Debrecen 2–0 at home. After losing the first tie in Debrecen by 4–2. DVTK met Újpest FC in the Cup final, in what was a rematch of the 1977 Final. Újpest took the lead early on through Róbert Litauszki, and held on to their lead all the way until the 91st minute, when Bacsa equalized. Diósgyőr eventually lost to Újpest in the 2013–14 Hungarian Cup final on penalty shoot-out, after Husic and William Alves failed to score from the spot. Despite the defeat, Diósgyőr are eligible for the 2014-15 UEFA Europa League since Újpest did not receive the UEFA licence from the Hungarian Football Federation. This meant that DVTK were playing European football cup qualifiers for the first time in the 21st century. In the 1st round, they Birkirkara 6–2 on aggregate, and also eliminated Litex Lovech, beating them 0–2, and losing the return leg 1–2. In the next round, they encountered FK Krasznodar, who defeated DVTK 1–5, in the first game. DVTK won the away leg 0–3, but were eliminated on away goals.

DVTK started off the 2014/15 season by winning 4 of their first 6 games, drew at the home defending champions DVSC 1-1 and suffered their first loss in October, against Paks. In October 2014, DVTK managed to beat Ferencváros 2–1, with Griffiths and Takács scoring for the home side. This marked the first time Diósgyőr defeated Ferencváros in a league game at home since December 1981. They ended the 2014 calendar year by defeating Újpest 2–1 at the DVTK-Stadium, with a '94 minute goal from Griffiths sealing the victory. The team's good run of form came to an end during the spring part of the season. Sivic would fail to win a single league game from February to April, and was fired after a 3–0 defeat at Ferencváros. The team finished off the remaining 5 games of the season under DVTK Legend Zoltán Vitelki, who had represented the club as a player between 1989 and 1998, and also between 2000 and 2008. Vitelki didn't lose any games while he was in charge, and DVTK finished 7th.

The club started off the 2015/16 season under Balázs Bekő. His tenure would last 19 games. Despite winning his first game 2–1 against Vasas, the club would go on a 4-week losing streak, including a 1–2 defeat against Videoton, with both Videoton goals being scored after the 93rd minute. Bekő would win 5 of his 19 games, and was replaced by former Hungary national team coach, Sándor Egervári. Egervári debuted with a loss on the first matchday of the spring part of the season, losing 1–0 to Puskás Akadémia in February. He would quickly follow up with victories over Budapest Honvéd, Videoton, and a draw away at Ferencváros. The club finished the season with 3 consecutive losses, and achieved a 9th-place finish. Egervári chose not to renew his contract.

The club started off the new season with former DVTK player, and Videoton legend, Ferenc Horváth. Horváth started off the season with two wins, against rivals Videoton, and Újpest, but failed to win any of his next 9 games, suffering a 6–2 defeat to FTC, and a 0–3 defeat to Budapest Honvéd. In October 2016, DVTK played an 8-goal thriller at Újpest (played at Fáy Utcai Stadion), which saw the lead change 5 times. DVTK took the lead through Vela, but Újpest quickly turned the game around by the '37th minute. Bognár equalized for DVTK from a penalty, and Lipták put the red and whites ahead. Újpest scored two goals in 3 minutes, and were looking destined to win the game, before Vitalijs Jagodinskis equalized for DVTK in the '92nd minute. This would be the only Hungarian top-flight goal of the Latvian player. The following week, DVTK played their last ever game at the old DVTK-Stadium, losing 2–3 to Ferencváros. For the next 1,5 years, Diósgyőr would play their home games in Debrecen and Mezőkövesd. Horváth was sacked after a 2–3 defeat to MTK, winning 6 of his 21 games in charge. His replacement was Tamás Bódog, who debuted with a 3–1 victory over Újpest. Despite losing 1–3 on the last day of the season, due to MTK drawing 1–1 to Paks, Bódog managed to keep the club up. He only lost 2 games during his tenure, and DVTK finished 10th, and were equal on points with MTK, but due to their superior goal difference, DVTK escaped relegation.

Diósgyőr started the autumn part of the 2017/18 season, defeating Vasas and Szombathely twice, and also recording victories over DVSC and Budapest Honvéd. In November 2017, DVTK lost 1–2 against Újpest, with former DVTK player Novotnhy scoring both goals for Újpest, and with Ugrai scoring for DVTK. The spring part of the season did not exactly go to plan, as the club only recorded one victory between February and May 2018, at one point losing 6 games back-to-back. Although, that victory was against Ferencváros, beating them 2–1, and breaking their undefeated streak. Bódog was sacked after DVTK lost 0–1 to Puskás Akadémia on matchday 27. He was replaced by former DVTK player, and one half of the greatly beloved Spanish duo of DVTK of the late 00's, Fernando Fernandez. The new DVTK-Stadium was unveiled on the 5th of May, 2018, after more than a year and a half of construction. DVTK's first game at the new stadium was a 0–1 loss to Mezőkővesd, with an '88 minute goal, scored by Drazic. Going into the last game of the season, DVTK were last place, having accumulated 33 points, 1 point behind Vasas, and 2 points behind Balmazújváros. Earlier that season, DVTK had suffered three humiliating losses to Balmazújváros. First, they lost 4–0, in August, then they would go on to lose their home game against them as well, with Bachana Arabuli converting a questionable penalty in the 95th minute. As painful as the first two defeats were, the third one was by far the most enraging. DVTK took the lead at the start of the second half thanks to Óváry. They held on to their lead until the 88th minute, when Balmazújváros were awarded a penalty, just like in the previous game. This time, the penalty taker was none other, than former DVTK player, Gergely Rudolf, who was at one point the club's most expensive signing. He left DVTK for Győri-ETO with one year left on his contract, and would later play for DVTK's biggest rivals, Nyíregyháza. This was a sin unforgivable in many DVTK fan's eyes, and whenever Rudolf would play back in Miskolc, he would be received by a storm of jeers and boos. Rudolf scored the penalty, and two minutes later, when Balmazújváros were awarded another penalty, in the 90th minute, he would score again, making it 2–1. The odds were not in DVTK's favour in terms of staying up, and the fact that they were playing champions Videoton, did not make the idea of DVTK in the top-flight any more likely. Nevertheless, the team pulled off a miraculous escape from relegation, beating Videoton 2–1, and thanks to other results going in their favour, such as Vasas losing 3–1 at Honvéd, and Balmazújváros drawing 3–3 to Ferencváros, the club managed to stay up.

The club had their worst ever start to a top-flight season during the first half of the 2018/19 season. They only won one of their first 13 games, against Paks, and went on a 6-game losing streak, including two games where the team lost due to a late goal, against Újpest, where the club conceded in the '89th minute, and also against Puskás Akadémia, where the club conceded in the '88th minute. The club's fortunes started to change in November, when an unbeaten streak started, which lasted all the way until February. During the streak, the team scored surprise victories over DVSC (1–0), and at Fehérvár (1–2). The team only won their first away game of the season in December, at the Fehérvári Úti Stadium, against Paks. The unbeaten streak was broken by Újpest, when they defeated DVTK 5–0 at the Megyeri Arena. This was followed up with a 7–0 loss at Ferencváros. The club would only win two away fixtures throughout the entire season, both of them taking place in Western Hungary, at Paks and Fehérvár. In May 2019, the club played a memorable 4–4 draw at Budapest Honvéd. Former Honvéd player, Vernes, scored a hat-trick, coming on as a substitute in the '46th minute. Going in to the last game of the season, DVTK were playing Újpest at home, and had to win to stay alive, and keep playing in the top-division. The team had not won a game by more than a one-goal margin throughout the entire season, and Újpest were in the fight for a Europa-League position, and were billed as the favourites. However, DVTK secured top-flight football for at least one more year, by defeating the purple and whites 3–0, with goals from Tajti, Hasani and Korbély. The latter was making his DVTK debut that very game.

The club started off the 2019/20 season with a 2–1 victory over Honvéd. The club lost 4 consecutive league games, (one of which was a 5–1 defeat at rivals, Fehérvár), and the team's performance was so bad, that the ultras announced an official boycott of all DVTK games. Fernando was sacked after a 1–0 defeat to Ferencváros on the 1st of September, and was replaced by Tamás Feczkó. Feczkó won 5 of his first 12 games in charge, and managed to get the fans to return to the stadium, with the short-lived boycott coming to an end in November. During the spring part of the season, the club lost just one game until the end of March, when COVID-19 restrictions rendered the championship to temporarily stop. When the championship resumed in May, the team lost its momentum, only managing one win, and finished the season with 5 consecutive losses. This was enough for a 9th-place finish.

The team started off the 2020/21 season winning only two games out of their first 9 fixtures. Feczkó was sacked after a 2–1 loss at Mezőkövesd. The temporary replacement was Gergely Geri, who oversaw 3 consecutive defeats. From the start of the spring part of the season, Koran Zekich was in charge of the club.

== 2020s ==
Zokic's first victory came on 6 February 2021, when Diósgyőr celebrated their 111-year anniversary by beating Kisvárda FC at home 2–0 on the 20th match day of the 2020-21 Nemzeti Bajnokság I season. After the match in an interview, Zoran Zekić said that if the club continues like this, they will not be relegated.

DVTK's relegation was confirmed on 1 May, when Honvéd, who were at risk of relegation as well, defeated Budafok. This meant, that for the first time in 11 years, the club would be playing in the 2nd Division. The club's continuous stay in the 1st division from 2011 until 2021 was their longest ever time spent without relegation.

The team started off the 2021/22 season under former DVSC coach, Elemér Kondás. Under Kondás, DVTK won 18 of their first 29 fixtures, and promotion was looking feasible. The owners made the inconceivable decision to sack Kondás after a 0–1 win over Dorog. His replacement was Szeged Coach, Dragan Vukmir, whose side had beaten DVTK just a week prior. During the 2021-22 Nemzeti Bajnokság II season, Diósgyőr finished third; therefore, could not get promoted to the first division. Diósgyőr was preceded by Vasas SC and Kecskeméti TE.

On 23 August 2022, Dragan Vukmir was sacked, after a 4–3 loss at Pécs, and one day later was replaced by Serhiy Kuznetsov. Vukmir won two matches and lost three matches in the first five match days of the 2022-23 Nemzeti Bajnokság II season. Under Kuznetsov, the club's fortunes changed drastically, going on a 9-game, and later finishing the season with an 11-game unbeaten streak. The club would lose only 1 home game under the Serbian coach in the 2nd Division, against Haladás, in December 2022.

On 23 April 2023, Diósgyór beat Kozármisleny SE 3–2 on the 33rd matchday of the 2022–23 Nemzeti Bajnokság II season. The victory resulted in winning and promotion to the first league. On 30 April 2023, MTK Budapest drew with Ajka which resulted in DVTK becoming the champions of 2022–23 Nemzeti Bajnokság II season. On the same day, Diósgyőr beat Csákvár 3-1 consolidating their victory of the championship.

On 31 January 2024, Serhiy Kuznetsov was sacked. On 14 February 2024, Vladimir Radenkovic was appointed.

In the 2023–24 Magyar Kupa season, Diósgyőr were eliminated by Ferencváros in the quarter-finals on 3 April 2024 in a 2–0 defeat at the Diósgyőr Stadium in Miskolc.

Diósgyőr did not start the year 2025 well. On 1 February 2025, Diósgyőr drew with Újpest at home. On 9 February 2025, Zalaegerszegi TE beat Diósgyőr 2-1 at the ZTE Arena. On 15 February 2025, they lost to Nyíregyháza Spartacus FC 1-2 at home. Finally, on 19 February 2025, Radenkovic was sacked after a negative start of the season. On 12 June 2025, Valdas Dambrauskas resigned from his position as manager. Since Dambrauskas initiated the termination of his contract, the club did not have to pay him anything.

On 9 June 2025, former Újpest FC player, Zoltán Kovács, was appointed as the new sports director of the club. Kovács talked about his plans as sports director. On 18 June 2025, Vladimir Radenković was appointed as the manager of the club for the second time in the club's history.

On 6 March 2026, Radenkovic resigned after losing to Kispest Honvéd in the quarter-finals of the 2025-26 Magyar Kupa season the previous day.

On 18 April 2026, Diősgyőr lost 5-0 to Debrecen at home and were relegated to the second division. After the match, Nebojša Vignjević was sacked.
