= Diósgyőri VTK in European football =

Diósgyőr-Vasgyári Testgyakorlók Köre is a professional football club based in Miskolc, Hungary.

== Matches ==
Season	Competition	Round	Club	Home	Away	Aggregate
1977–78	European Cup Winners' Cup	1R	(Turkey) Beşiktaş J.K.	5–0	0–2	5–2
1977–78	European Cup Winners' Cup	2R	(Socialist Federal Republic of Yugoslavia) Hajduk Split	2–1	1–2	3–3(aet)
1979–80	UEFA Cup	1R	(Austria) SK Rapid Wien	3–2	1–0	4–2
1979–80	UEFA Cup	2R	(Scotland) Dundee United FC	3–1	1–0	4–1
1979–80	UEFA Cup	3R	(West Germany) 1. FC Kaiserslautern	0–2	1–6	1–8
1980–81	European Cup Winners' Cup	PR	(Scotland) Celtic	2–1	0–6	2–7
1998	UEFA Intertoto Cup	1R	(Malta) Sliema Wanderers	2–0	3–2	5–2
1998	UEFA Intertoto Cup	2R	(Turkey) Altay Izmir	0–1	1–1	1–2
2014–15	UEFA Europa League	1Q	(Malta) Birkirkara	2–1	4–1	6–2
2014–15	UEFA Europa League	2Q	(Bulgaria) Litex Lovech	1–2	2–0	3–2
2014–15	UEFA Europa League	3Q	(Russia) Krasnodar	1–5	0–3	1–8

Notes

- 1R: First round
- 2R: Second round
- 3R: Third round
- PR: Preliminary round
- 1Q: First qualifying round
- 2Q: Second qualifying round
- 3Q: Third qualifying round

== Record by country of opposition ==
- Correct as of 7 July 2015

Country	Pld	W	D	L	GF	GA	GD	Win%
Austria	2	2	0	0	4	2	+2	100.00
Bulgaria	2	1	0	1	3	2	+1	50.00
Germany	2	0	0	2	1	8	−7	0.00
Malta	4	4	0	0	11	4	+7	100.00
Russia	2	0	0	2	1	8	−7	0.00
Scotland	4	3	0	1	6	8	−2	75.00
Turkey	4	1	1	2	6	4	+2	25.00
(Croatia) Yugoslavia	2	1	0	1	3	3	+0	50.00
Totals	20	12	1	7	34	31	+3	60

P – Played; W – Won; D – Drawn; L – Lost

== European Record ==
As of 24 April 2018.

- Biggest win: 28/09/1977, Diósgyőr 5-0 (Turkey) Beşiktaş J.K., Diósgyőri Stadion, Miskolc
- Biggest defeat: 20/08/1980, (Scotland) Celtic 6-0 Diósgyőr, Celtic Park, Glasgow
- Appearances in UEFA Cup Winners' Cup: 2
- Appearances in UEFA Europa League: 2
- Appearances in UEFA Intertoto Cup: 1
- Player with most UEFA appearances: 12 (Hungary) Ferenc Oláh
- Top scorers in UEFA club competitions: 5 (Hungary) György Tatár
