= György Tatár =

Hungarian footballer (1952–2024)

Personal information
- Date of birth: 10 September 1952
- Place of birth: Miskolc, Hungary
- Date of death: 20 April 2024 (aged 71)
- Place of death: Miskolc, Hungary
- Position: Midfielder

Senior career*
Years	Team	Apps	(Gls)
1971–1972	Honvéd Papp József Miskolc		
1972–1983	Diósgyőri VTK	272	(53)
1983–1984	Castellón	15	(2)

International career
1978–1980	Hungary	11	(5)
- * Club domestic league appearances and goals

György Tatár (10 September 1952 – 20 April 2024) was a Hungarian footballer. During his club career, he played for Honvéd Papp József Miskolc, Diósgyőri VTK and Castellón. He made 11 appearances for the Hungary national team, scoring 5 goals.

== Club ==
By scoring five goals for Diósgyőri VTK, he was the top scorer of the club in UEFA competitions.

== Death ==
Tatár died on 20 April 2024, at the age of 71.

== Honours ==
Diósgyőri VTK Magyar Kupa: 1976–77, 1979–80
