= János Pajkos =

Hungarian footballer and manager

Personal information
- Date of birth: 6 March 1958 (age 68)
- Place of birth: Debrecen, Hungary

Managerial career
- Years: Team
- 2000-2001: Debreceni VSC
- 2001-2002: Debreceni VSC
- 2005: Békéscsaba 1912 Előre
- 2005-2006: Diósgyőri VTK
- 2006: Győri ETO FC
- 2007: Diósgyőri VTK

János Pajkos (born 6 March 1958) is a Hungarian football manager and a former player. He last managed Diósgyőri VTK.

== Managerial career ==
=== Ferencváros ===
He managed the youth team of Ferencvárosi TC in 2003.

=== Debrecen ===
On 18 March 2001, he was appointed as the manager of Debreceni VSC. He won the 2000–01 Magyar Kupa season.

=== Békéscsaba ===
On 11 April 2005, he was appointed as the manager of Békéscsaba 1912 Előre.

=== Diósgyőr ===
On 9 June 2006, he was sacked from his position as manager of Diósgyőri VTK.

=== Győr ===
On 5 December 2007, he resigned from his position as manager of Győri ETO FC.

== Personal life ==
He is noted for sucking a lollipop during matches.
