= Barnabás Tornyi =

Hungarian football manager

Banrabás Tornyi
Personal information
- Date of birth: 14 April 1953 (age 73)
- Place of birth: Gyula, Hungary

Senior career*
Years	Team	Apps	(Gls)
- Nyíregyháza Spartacus FC
1978–1989	Diósgyőri VTK		

Managerial career
- 1992: Diósgyőr
- 1992: Győr
- 1994–1995: New York Hungaria
- 1996–1998: Diósgyőr
- 1999: Zalaegerszeg
- 2000–2001: Honvéd
- 2001: Al-Tadamon
- 2002: Vasas
- 2003: Dunaferr
- 2009–2010: Diősgyőr
- * Club domestic league appearances and goals

Barnabás Tornyi (born 14 April 1953) is a Hungarian professional football manager and former player.

== Managerial career ==
=== Diósgyőr (second spell) ===
Between 1996 and 1999, he managed Diósgyőri VTK. In the 1996-97 Nemzeti Bajnokság II season, Diósgyőr finished in the second position and were promoted to the first division. In the 1997–98 Nemzeti Bajnokság I season, Diósgyőr finished in the 11th position and remained in the top division.

On 20 July 1997, his team beat Budapest Honvéd FC 5–1 at the Diósgyőri Stadion.

=== Honvéd ===
Between 2000 and 2001, he managed Budapest Honvéd FC.

On 11 April 2001, he was sacked from Budapest Honvéd FC.

The court decided that Tornyi received 30 million Hungarian Forints from Honvéd.

=== Vasas ===
On 11 April 2002, he was appointed as the manager of Vasas SC. He debuted against Szombathelyi Haladás at the Rohonci út.

=== Tatabánya ===
On 19 March 2007, he was appointed as the manager of Tatabányai SC.

=== Siófok ===
On 25 October 2007, he was appointed as the manager of BFC Siófok.

=== Diósgyőr (third spell) ===
On 16 December 2009, he was appointed as the manager of Diósgyőri VTK. On 7 April 2010, he resigned from his position. On 1 June 2010, he filed a case against Diósgyőr.

== Personal life ==
In November 2019, he was caught shoplifting in Orange County, Florida in the United States. He spent two days in custody due to stealing underwear and socks.
