= Diósgyőri VTK =

Hungarian football club

- Full name: Diósgyőri Vasgyárak Testgyakorló Köre
- Nickname: Diósgyőr
- Short name: DVTK
- Founded: 6 February 1910; 116 years ago
- Ground: Diósgyőri Stadion, Miskolc
- Capacity: 15,325
- Chairman: Gergely Sántha
- Head coach: Péter Takács
- League: NB II
- 2025–26: NB I, 11th of 12 (relegated)
- Website: www.dvtk.eu
Home colours	Away colours	Third colours

Diósgyőri Vasgyárak Testgyakorló Köre, more commonly Diósgyőri VTK (Hungarian: [ˈdioːʒɟøːri ˈveːteːkaː]) is a professional football club from Hungary. Located in the Diósgyőr district of Miskolc. Founded in 1910 by the local working class youth, the club plays in the Nemzeti Bajnokság I, the top flight of Hungarian football, and has spent most of its history in the top tier. Diósgyőr is best known for its passionate supporters – in the past years, Diósgyőr had one of the highest average attendances in the Hungarian top division. The football club enjoyed its first golden age in the late 1970s and early 1980s, including a third-place finish in the 1978–79 season of the Hungarian League and two Hungarian Cup triumphs in 1977 and 1980.

== History ==
Diósgyőri VTK, a Hungarian football club, was founded in 1910. The club's history is marked by periods of both success and struggle. They achieved their first Hungarian Cup victory in the 1976-77 season, which led to their qualification for the UEFA Cup Winners' Cup. The team's best league finish was third place in the 1978-79 season. The article also notes frequent promotions and relegations, with their longest uninterrupted run in the top league lasting from 2011 to 2021. The most recent events include their promotion to the first league in 2023.

== Crest and colours ==
=== Naming history ===
- 1910–38: Diósgyőri VTK
- 1938–45: Diósgyőri MÁVAG SC
- 1945–51: Diósgyőri VTK
- 1951–56: Diósgyőri Vasas
- 1956–92: Diósgyőri VTK Miskolc
- 1992–00: Diósgyőr FC
- 2000–03: Diósgyőri VTK
- 2003–04: DVTK 1910
- 2004–05: Diósgyőri Balaton FC (later Diósgyőri VTK-BFC)
- 2005–07: Diósgyőri VTK
- 2007–08: Diósgyőri VTK-BORSODI
- 2008–present: Diósgyőri VTK

=== Manufacturers and shirt sponsors ===
The following table shows in detail Diósgyőri VTK kit manufacturers and shirt sponsors by year:

Period	Kit manufacturer	Shirt sponsor
−2008	Saller	Szeviép / Regale Klíma
2008	Saller	–
2009	Saller	Szeviép / É.M.K.
2009–2010	Erreà	AVE / Jánosik és TSA. / É.M.K.
2010–2011	Erreà	AVE
2011–2013	Nike	–
2014–2018	Nike	Borsodi
2018–2021	2Rule	Borsodi
2021–	2Rule	Hell Energy

== Stadia and facilities ==
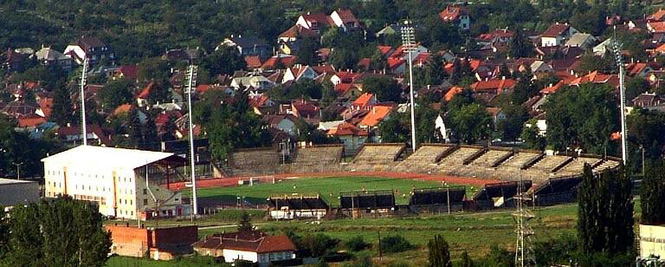
The old Diósgyőri Stadion

The home of the club is the multi-purpose Diósgyőri Stadion located in Miskolc, Borsod-Abaúj-Zemplén County, Hungary.

They played their matches from 1911 to 1939 near the canteen of the Diósgyőr Ironworks. The stadium was first opened on 25 June 1939.

In 1968, the stadium underwent major expansions and the capacity was increased to 22,000. The stadium was then reopened after renovations on 26 May 1968. At that time, it was the biggest stadium in Hungary outside of Budapest. The highest attendance record for the stadium was set on 27 November 1968, when approximately 35,000 people saw a match between the DVTK and the Ferencvárosi TC. In the 2000s, its capacity was dropped to 15,000 due to security reasons sections of the stadium was closed from the public.

Prior to demolition in 2016, the stadium had the following areas: the western Main Stand that was built in 1939. Three other wings were built in 1968, with a grass surface and a tartan covered running track, where football matches and athletic championships were held. The Complex contained one grass surfaced training field built in 1977, one with artificial turf built in 2006, and two others with cinder covering that opened in the 1960s. The artificial grass field had lighting. Near the stadium, there is a covered training field and a former boxing arena re-opened for soccer in 2009. Although the stadium did not meet the standards of many other European stadiums, it was the most modern arena in Eastern Hungary. Floodlighting was installed and began operating on 15 November 2003.

The Main Stand had its first renovation in 2005–06 and after a significant modernization project, it was opened on 23 April 2006 with a roof over 1,504 seats. In 2009–2010, the eastern-wing of the 40-year-old stands was demolished. For the 100th birthday of the club, new covered stands were built with a buffet, restrooms, and 3,137 seats on the so-called "Sunny wing" or "Napos oldal". This wing was so-named because the sun would make it difficult for fans to watch matches during afternoon competition. Construction began on 10 August 2009 and an opening ceremony was held on 6 March 2010. The 2009–10 renovation cost 400 million HUF. In 2011–2012, the training fields were modernized, and two additional fields were built. Currently, there are four training fields with floodlights, two with natural grass and 2 with artificial grass.

From 1992 to 2000, the field was named DFC Stadium due to the club changed its name from DVTK to Diósgyőri Football club. During the 2007–2008 season, the name of the stadium was DVTK-Borsodi Stadium, because of a sponsorship arrangement.

A famous section of the stadium called the Csáki-stand is named after the fan, József Csáki.

In 2016, the construction of a new stadium has been started.

On 20 June 2017, it was announced that Diósgyőr is no longer able to play their home matches at the Mezőkövesdi Városi Stadion due to the turf not being able to endure the extra matches played on it. As a consequence of this, Diósgyőr played their home matches of the 2017–18 Nemzeti Bajnokság I matches at stadium of Debreceni VSC', Nagyerdei Stadion, in Debrecen.

On 5 May 2018, the new stadium was opened officially. The first official match was played between Diósgyőr and Mezkőkövesd in the 2017–18 Nemzeti Bajnokság I season. The match ended with a 1–0 win for the Borsod-rival Mezőkövesd. The only goal was scored by Dražić in the 88th minute of the game.

The capacity of the newly built DVTK-Stadium is 15,325.

=== Highest attended games at the DVTK-Stadium ===
Date	Match	Attendance	References
27 November 1968	Diósgyőr 1–2 Ferencváros	35,000	
20 June 1992	Diósgyőr 0–2 Ferencváros	30,000	
4 April 1969	Diósgyőr 0–0 Ferencváros	30,000	
26 April 1970	Diósgyőr 1–1 Újpest	25,000	
15 November 1975	Diósgyőr 0–0 Ferencváros	25,000	
25 February 1978	Diósgyőr 2–0 Ferencváros	25,000	
25 November 1978	Diósgyőr 1–0 Ferencváros	25,000	
15 March 1978	Diósgyőr 0–0 Vasas	25,000	
16 October 1976	Diósgyőr 3–2 Ferencváros	25,000	
5 April 1975	Diósgyőr 1–1 Ferencváros	25,000	
23 August 1997	Diósgyőr 0–2 Újpest	22,000	
23 May 1998	Diósgyőr 0–2 Ferencváros	22,000	
18 September 1982	Diósgyőr 2–2 Ferencváros	22,000	
28 November 1970	Diósgyőr 1–1 Ferencváros	20,000	
21 March 1971	Diósgyőr 0–1 Újpest	20,000	

== Supporters ==
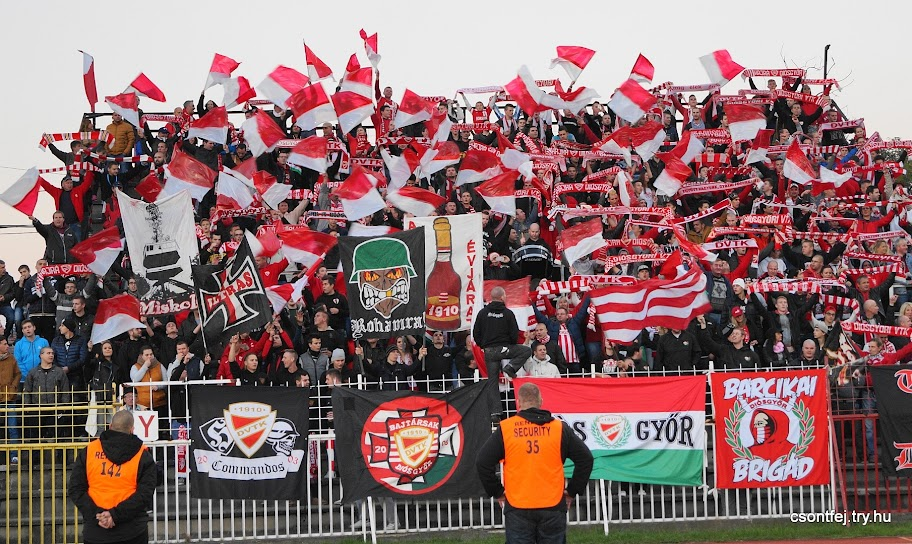
DVTK Ultras against Ferencváros, October 2015.

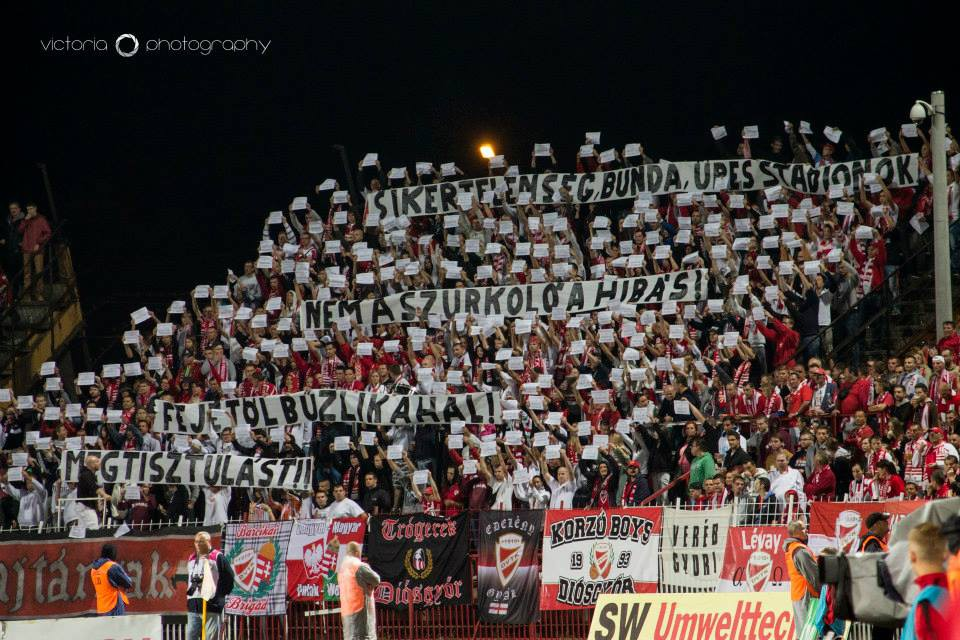
DVTK fans with anti-match fixing messages aimed towards the Hungarian football federation, against Debrecen, August 2014.

DVTK has not won a Nemzeti Bajnokság I title and has not spent more than 10 consecutive seasons in the 1st Division. The club's fanbase is estimated at 100,000 to 150,000 people. Most fans reside in Miskolc and the surrounding towns in Borsod–Abaúj–Zemplén County, including Kazinczbarcika, Szerencs, Putnok, Méra, Sajóvámos, and Sátoraljaújhely. Supporters also live in Budapest, Szeged, and locations such as Árhely, Szabadka, and Ruzs.

During the 1963 Nemzeti Bajnokság I (autumn) season, despite the team having a streak of bad results, and finishing 11th, DVTK fans turned up to all home games, and the team had the highest attendance out of all the non-capital teams in the league, and 4th highest attendance behind Ferencváros, Vasas and Budapest Honvéd, with an average attendance of 15,000.

During the 1966 Nemzeti Bajnokság I season, Diósgyőr fans repeated this feat again, being the provincial team with the highest attendance, and only being bested in terms of numbers by Ferencváros, Budapest Honvéd, and Újpest, with an average attendance of 15,000, again.

In the 1968 Nemzeti Bajnokság I season, DVTK had the second highest attendance in the league, behind Ferencváros, with an average attendance of over 17,000. It was in that season, that DVTK took on Ferencváros at the DVTK-stadium in front of 35,000 people, in November 1968. In the span of just a few years, attendance numbers in Diósgyőr experienced a sharp decline, with only an average of 5,000 fans attending the DVTK stadium during the 1972/73 season, and the following season, an average of only 3,000 people showing up to watch DVTK in the 2nd Division. During this time, DVTK also lost the distinction of being the highest attended provincial team, with Fehérvár, Zalaegerszeg and even Salgótarján having a higher attendance.

In the second half of the decade, attendance numbers started rising again, to about 7,000. DVTK had the highest attendance during the 1989/90, 1990/91 1994/95, 1995/96, and 1996/97 seasons of the Eastern Conference of the Nemzeti Bajnokág II (2nd division). The team also had the second highest attendance during the 1992/93 1st Division season, with 9,000, with only fans of Ferencváros turning up in bigger numbers to home games that season.

During the 1997-98 Nemzeti Bajnokság I season, DVTK had the highest attendance in the 1st Division, with over 12,000 people regularly cheering on the red and whites. That season, four out of the five most attended Nemzeti Bajnokság I games were played at the DVTK stadium, against Újpest, Ferencváros, Győr and MTK.

In the 1998-99 Nemzeti Bajnokság I season, the two teams with the highest attendance were both from the North-Eastern part of the country, with DVTK and their arch rivals, Nyíregyháza Spartacus both having average attendances of over 9,000. DVTK had a higher attendance by an incredibly small margin (about 300 people), which meant the team boasted the highest attendance in the league for the second season in a row.

DVTK also had the highest attendance of the Nemzeti Bajnokság II during the 2001/02, 2002/03 and 2003/04 seasons with 3,000. During the team's first season back in the top-flight in 2004/05, after a 4-year hiatus, the team had the highest attendance in the entire country, for the third time, with 6,700 people.

During the 2010/11 season of the Eastern conference of the 2nd Division, DVTK had the highest attendance, with 2,600. In the 2011–12 season, the average number of fans was 7,793, which meant that DVTK, once again, was the team with the highest attendance in the league. The relationship with the Nyíregyháza, Ferencváros, and Újpest supporters is particularly bad. DVTK fans have previously sympathized with the other red and white team in East Hungary, Debrecen supporters. In recent years, a friendly relationship with the supporters of Szeged has evolved and they have a friendship with the Polish fans of GKS Bełchatów.

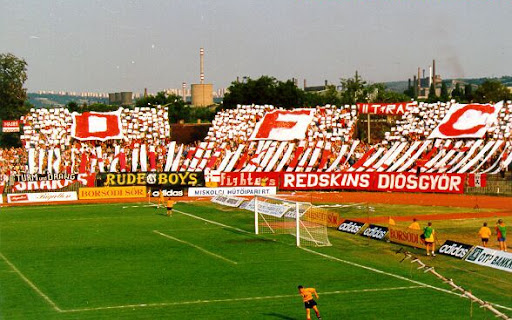
Choreography of Harcosok Diósgyőr against Nyíregyháza, 1999.

On 19 July 2014, UEFA issued sanctions against Ferencváros and Diósgyőr and Slovakia's Spartak Trnava, following racist behaviour by their fans during 2014–15 UEFA Europa League qualifying matches against Maltese sides Sliema Wanderers, Birkirkara and Hibernians respectively. Ferencvaros were the hardest hit by the UEFA measures as club were fined by €20,000 and the partial closure of their stadium following monkey chants and racist banners displayed in both legs in Malta and Hungary.

=== Supporter Groups ===
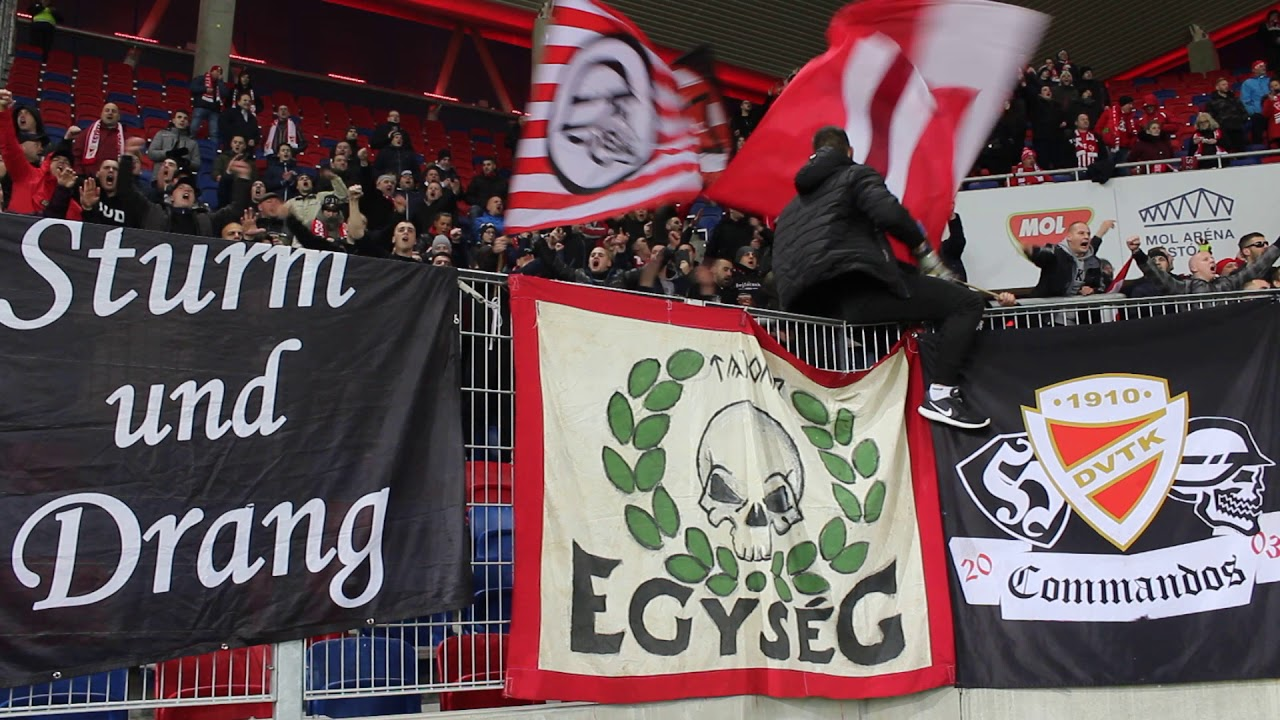
DVTK away at Fehérvár, February 2019. Banners of Sturm Und Drang, Egység (Unity) and Commandos can be seen. DVTK won the game 1–2.

Throughout the 1980s and onwards, a new subculture was emerging in Eastern Europe, the ultras culture. The culture was gaining popularity rapidly, and Hungarian football fans began imitating the fanatics of Western Europe, where ultras and hooliganism were deeply engrained in their football culture. The first supporter group of DVTK was founded in 1993, and the name, Sturm Und Drang was chosen, to pay tribute to the German literature movement of the same name. Soon, they would be joined in the Y sector of the DVTK stadium by other Ultra groups, such as Fighters, Red Gladiators, Rude Boys, Redskins, Emigrantes Rojos and Korzó Boys.

In 1998, the separate groups would be united under one banner, called Harcosok. This union between a number of different groups would exist until 2003. In the 2000s, other supporter groups, such as Commandos, Bajtársak (Brothers In Arms) and Hazádnak Rendületlenül (Steadfastly For Your Nation) would come to exist, further solidifying the Ultras' impact on the football scene in Diósgyőr. In the 2010s decade, groups such as Beagle Boys, Egység, Trógerek and Red Company, Pacin Ultras and Barczikai Brigád were founded.

In November 2013, prior to a home game against Videoton, members of the security personnel were unwilling to let in the flags of Sturm Und Drang, Commandos and Hazádnak Rendületlenül. Their reasoning was that the flags had political messages, (namely, a map of Greater Hungary, and a drawn depiction of a soldier wearing a military hat reminiscent of those worn by Hungarian soldiers during the Second World War) which are not allowed to be displayed in Hungarian Stadiums. In response to the flags being taken down, Ultras Diósgyőr announced that they would boyscott the ensuing games, and asked the respective supporter groups of other Hungarian clubs to follow suit.

There have been numerous occasions in the 21st century, where Ultras Diósgyőr decided to boycott games for a brief period of time, such as in July 2012. This was in protest to MLSZ planning to introduce a compulsory fan card, in order to be eligible to attend matches in the 1st Division. The fan card would contain all of one's personal details, and thus would prevent ultras from retaining anonymity.

There was another boycott in August 2019, due to the team's incredibly poor run of results, including a 5–1 defeat at the hands of Fehérvár. The boycott ended in November 2019, and Ultras Diósgyőr officially returned at the 2–0 defeat of Kisvárda.

Most recently the ultras decided to boycott again in the 2025/26 season as well starting after another poor run of form dropping them into the relegation zone. The ultras demanded the firing of the then manager (Vladimir Radenkovič) and other higher ups at the club. After Vladimir Radenkovič and the sporting director eventually got fired the ultras decided to come back but even this support couldn't help the team avoid relegation to the second division at the end of the season.

== Rivalries ==
=== Nyíregyháza ===
The club's main rival is Nyíregyháza Spartacus, with whom they share a long-lasting rivalry, colloquially known as the "eastern derby" (Keleti Rangadó) due to both clubs hailing from the eastern part of Hungary. The roots of the rivalry can be traced all the way back to the 1980s. The location of the two clubs also adds to the ferocity of the rivalry, with their respective cities being a mere hour drive away from each other. Since DVTK established themselves as a solid first division club in the mid-2000s, and due to the fact, that Nyíregyháza spent all but 4 seasons in the otp bank liga in the same timeframe, the two teams have rarely met in the 21st century. Nevertheless, the matches contested between them remains one of the most highly attended fixtures in eastern Hungary, with fights, animosity and violence often leaving their mark on these games.

The first time the two teams met was in 1939, in the 2nd division. DVTK defeated Nyíregyháza 2–7 at Vasutas Sportpálya. In April 1947 DVTK recorded their highest-scoring victory in the Eastern Derby, demolishing Nyíregyháza 6–1. In 1967, DVTK eliminated Nyíregyháza from the Magyar Kupa, defeating the team from Szabolcs-County 0–4. During the following edition of the Cup in 1968, Nyíregyháza managed to seek revenge, eliminating DVTK after a 3–3 draw, due to the MLSZ's system of the team in the lower-league advancing in the cup in case of a draw.

The two teams have met 30 times in the Hungarian 1st Division, with DVTK being victorious 10 times, Nyíregyháza have 11 wins under their belt, while 9 games ended in a draw. The first time the two clubs played each other in the top-flight was in August 1980, which happened to be Nyíregyháza's first ever top-division game. The blue and reds emerged victorious 2–0. The game was attended by over 20,000 people at the Városi Stadion. The first DVTK player to score against Nyíregyháza in the top-flight was Miklós Szlifka, in December 1980. His goal was enough to give Diósgyőr their first ever top division victory over NYSFC. This game also marked Géza Szabó's second to last game on DVTK's bench, who had been in charge since 1973, and led the club to two national cups, in 1977, and 1980.

In April 1982, Diósgyőr suffered their biggest eastern derby defeat in the Nemzeti Bajnokság I after losing 3−0 to Nyíregyháza. In March 1983, DVTK defeated Nyíregyháza 2–0 after a brace from László Fekete. Both sides spent the 1983−84 Nemzeti Bajnokság I season fighting against relegation. Going into the last game of the season, DVTK were already relegated, but Nyíregyháza still had a minor chance of staying up, if they manage to beat DVTK. The game's result was a dubious 2–7 defeat against Nyíregyháza, who just so happened to need to win their last game by five goals in order to stay up. After having been convinced that the match was fixed, MLSZ ruled that both clubs would start their next season in the Nemzeti Bajnokság II with a -4 point deficit, and the game's result was declared null and void, with the official scoreline, ruled by MLSZ, was to be 0-0.

Both clubs would spend the next seven seasons in the 2nd Division, regularly finishing near each other in the table. In September 1985, József Dzurják became the first Diósgyőr player to score a brace at Nyíregyháza's Stadium. DVTK won the game 2–3. In May 1986, Dzurják would once again score a brace against DVTK's biggest rivals, this time, at the DVTK-Stadium, as DVTK defeated Nyíregyháza 2–0. He became the first DVTK player since István Kovács in 1963, to score a brace at home against Nyíregyháza. DVTK did the "double" over Nyíregyháza, and Dzurják scored four goals against them in a single season. The club finished the season fourth, five points above Nyíregyháza, who came fifth.

Both clubs were struggling against relegation during the 1986/87 season. In May 1987 the clubs played a 3–3 draw against each other at Városi Stadion. Both clubs secured their stay in the 2nd Division, with Nyíregyháza defeating Budafok 3–1, and Diósgyőr drawing 0–0 at Nagykanizsa on the last day of the season. The clubs finished the 1987/88 season 10th and 11th, with Nyíregyháza finishing one point above DVTK.

In September 1988, Diósgyőr contested a 2–2 draw against Nyíregyháza, with János Lengyel equalising for the red and whites in the 92nd minute. The club finished three places above Nyíregyháza, in the 1988/89 season, however, they had only accumulated two points more. Between May 1986 and September 1989, Diósgyőr could not get a single victory over Nyíregyháza. The streak finally came to an end, when Csiba scored the only goal of the match played between the clubs in the 12th round of the 1989/90 2nd Division season. DVTK would finish the season fifth, three points above Nyíregyháza.

After DVTK achieved promotion via play-off in 1991, beating Szeged SC, Nyíregyháza would follow suit in 1992, beating Haladás VSE through penalties. The clubs would meet in the 1st Division again in 1992. DVTK won the game 1–0, thanks to a goal by Kiser. The teams were simultaneously relegated at the end of the 1992/93 season.

In June 1995, Nyíregyháza defeated DVTK in Miskolc 0–1, for only the second time in their history.

In 1997, Diósgyőr would advance to the 2nd Division play-offs, by finishing 2nd, 1 point above Nyíregyháza, despite losing to them 1–0 in the penultimate day of the season, due to a 92nd-minute penalty from István Kovács. Nyíregyháza would get promoted in 1998, and the teams met in the top division, again, with Nyíregyháza defeating Diósgyőr 3–1 in November. In August 1999 the clubs played a 2–2 draw, with Danut Franzu becoming the fourth Diósgyőr player to score a brace at an eastern derby. Both clubs finished the 1999−2000 Nemzeti Bajnokság I season in the relegation zone.

The derby would not be held until October 2001, due to DVTK disbanding because of financial problems, for a short period of time, before being resurrected by the fans. In October 2001 DVTK recorded their first away victory at the Városi Stadion since 1990. The ub defeated Nyíregyháza 2–0, with goals from Kovács and Vojtekovszki.

In November 2004, Nyíregyháza was able to defeat Diósgyőr at the DVTK-Stadium, thanks to a goal by Zoltán Vasas, for the first time ever in a top-flight game, and for the first time in any fixture since 1995. In May 2005, as Nyíregyháza were fighting relegation, the team hosted DVTK. The team from Szabolcs-County went 2–0 up, with a brace from Vasas, but DVTK came back from the 2-goal deficit, thanks to late goals from Tisza ('78), and Siminic ('88). Nyíregyháza's relegation was confirmed two weeks later, after Lombard Pápa defeated Budapest Honvéd 1–0.

Nyíregyháza won the 2nd Division in 2007, finishing above Ferencváros, and were promoted as champions. In April 2008, Nyíregyháza defeated DVTK 2–1, with goals from Granáth, and Miskolczi. In November of the same year, the teams played a 2–2 draw at Nyíregyháza, with Diósgyőr scoring 2 goals within 10 minutes in the first half, but Nyíregyháza responding with goals by Apostu and Miskolczi. In April 2009, DVTK recorded their first home win in the 1st Division in the eastern derby since 1999, thanks to a goal from Lippai. In May 2010 Nyíregyháza recorded what remains their most recent home win over DVTK, after a 1–0 victory courtesy of Fouad Bouguerra. At the end of the 2009−10 Nemzeti Bajnokság I season, both clubs were relegated once again, coinciding with DVTK's centenary year.

In September 2010, Diósgyőr defeated Nyíregyháza 2–1 with goals from Menougong and Roszel, in the first 2nd division fixture played between the two teams since 2004. In the 2010/11 season of the 2nd division, DVTK defeated Nyíregyháza in one of the most intense eastern derbies of all time, as the game featured six yellow cards and one red. Diósgyőr went 0–3 up at the Városi Stadion, courtesy of Abdouraman, Rakovic and Dobos. Nyíregyháza managed to get back in the game, scoring two goals, but did not manage to equalise. This was Diósgyőr's first away victory at Nyíregyháza since 2001. A total of 4,000 visiting DVTK fans were present at the game, with the fanatics displaying an all-sector choreography, with red and white balloons. The two clubs finished with an equal goal difference at the end of the season, both of them having scored 66 goals, and conceded 23. DVTK were promoted at the end of the season, while Nyíregyháza finished third.

After a 4-year hiatus, the eastern derby returned to the top-flight In the 2014/15 season, as DVTK did the double over Nyíregyháza. The club beat Nyíregyháza at home 2–1, despite going down 0-1 early in the game, and also came away with a 2–1 victory from the Városi Stadion (Nyíregyháza), achieving their first top-flight victory at NYSFC's homeground. In the latter, Diósgyőr won the game thanks to a 90th-minute goal from Boros. At the end of the season, Nyíregyháza were relegated, and would not return to the highest division until 2024.

In October 2024, the clubs met in the top-flight after 9 years, with DVTK defeating Nyíregyháza 0–2. The red and blue crew became the first ever team to record a victory at the new Városi Stadion in Nyíregyháza. Fans of DVTK presented a tifo, which portrayed Simba from Lion King as a Diósgyőr ultra, with three hienas wearing Nyíregyháza Spartacus kits. The background was the stadium of Balmazújváros, which held a special meaning, as it was the stadium at which Nyíregyháza fans attacked the away sector during an eastern derby, then proceeded to run away on 7 May 2023. The game ended 1-1, and DVTK were promoted from NB2 at the end of the season.

Crowd trouble marred the derbies of 2004, 2008, 2009, and 2023.

In November 2004, Nyíregyháza was able to defeat Diósgyőr at the DVTK-Stadium, thanks to a goal by Zoltán Vasas, for the first time in a top-flight game, and for the first time in any fixture since 1995. After the game, a select group of DVTK fans entered the running track between he field and the stands, and fought with the riot police, who used batons and teargas to regain control of the crowd.

After the Nyíregyháza-DVTK game in April 2008, 5 Diósgyőr fans were detained for their behaviour during the game; four of them attempted to break through the cordon separating the away fans from the rest of the stadium, and proceeded to hurl it over the security fence. The fans were given prison sentences ranging from 15 to 50 days, with a number of the sentences being subsequently reduced.

=== Ferencváros ===
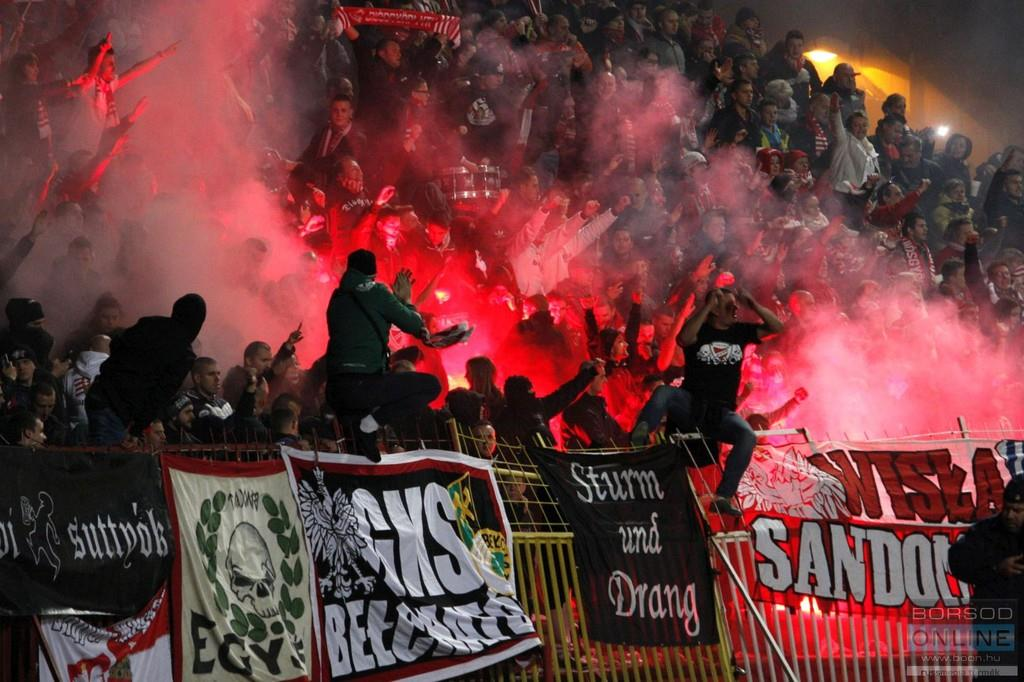
DVTK fans displaying a pyro show during the last ever game held at the DVTK stadium, in October 2016, against FTC.

Another Club that DVTK has an intense rivalry with is Ferencvárosi TC, the most successful Hungarian Club, regarding both domestic and international achievements, and are arguably the most well-known Hungarian team outside of the country. The sides have met on 113 different occasions in the league, with Diósgyőr winning a mere 21 of them, and with Ferencváros walking away as the winners 72 times. The teams' first ever meeting took place in September 1940, with DVTK, known at the time as Di-MáVag, suffered a 3–6 defeat. The club's first league victory over the green and whites came a couple of months later, in March 1941, when Diósgyőr beat FTC 0–1.

The two teams have also met in two Cup Finals, with FTC winning both of them, in 1942, and 1977, outscoring their rivals from Miskolc 6:2, and 3:0, respectively. They have also met in eight different Hungarian cup ties. Other than defeating the team from Borsod in two finals, Ferencváros eliminated DVTK from the cup in the round of 16 in 1944, the quarter finals in 1976, and also in 2017 and 2024. Although FTC beat DVTK in the final four of the 1977 cup, DVTK finished first in the group, consisting of Újpest, Vasas, FTC and Diósgyőr, and thus won the cup. DVTK eliminated FTC from the cup in 1981, thanks to a goal from Borostyán. DVTK knocked FTC out of the 1997/98 edition of the cup as well, with a 2–1 victory.

The club has only recorded back-to-back victories over FTC twice, in 1959, and in 1978. For 32 years straight (From 1981 until 2014) DVTK could not defeat the record-champions of Hungary at home a single time. In 1992, Ferencváros won the national championship on the last day of the season, at the DVTK-Stadium, defeating the red and whites 0–2. The victory ended FTC's 11-season long national title drought. The streak finally came to an end on 4 October 2014, when DVTK defeated FTC 2–1, with Miroslav Grumic and Takács scoring from the home team. This was also the year, that DVTK eliminated Ferencváros from the Hungarian League Cup, en route to the final against Videoton. The last ever game at the old DVTK-stadium was held against Ferencváros, in October 2016, which FTC won 2–3, despite blowing their 2-goal lead.

A similar case of bad luck could be said about DVTK's performance at FTC's old stadium, Stadion Albert Flórián, with the red and whites only managing to leave the pitch victorious after only two meetings, between 1972 and 1998. The club was also unable to get a win at Üllői Út for 31 years, between March 1941, and April 1972, when István Gass' goal was enough for the pride of Miskolc, to defeat FTC in their own backyard. The next win DVTK would get at FTC's stadium would come 26 years later. In October 1998, DVTK defeated FTC 3–4 in an intense game. DVTK went up by two goals by the '18th minute, thanks to a brace from Kulcsár, but Szabics pulled one back for Ferencváros before half time. Szabics would strike again, equalising for the home team, before Egressy (who would go on to score 17 goals that season) scored, and took the lead for Diósgyőr again. Bükszegi equalised for FTC, in the 74th minute, before Szabó scored the winning goal in the '84th minute. This was Ferencváros' first home defeat of the season, and DVTK became only the third Hungarian team of the '90s to score four goals at Üllői Út, after Győri ETO, and MTK. The highest ever attended game between the two teams took place on 28 March 1954, at Üllői Út. according to official statistics, 38,000 people were present to witness, what was at the time known as Budapesti Kinizsi defeat Diósgyőri Vasas 2–0.

Ferencváros has a tendency to draw big crowds in Miskolc, as they are probably the most hated football club within the city. As early as the 1950s, DVTK were accustomed to playing against FTC in front of big crowds. In October 1958, 18,000 DVTK-enthusiasts turned up to watch the team lose 0–2 to Budapest Kinizsi (Ferencváros), while the following home game against FTC was witnessed live by 23,000 people, a game that Diósgyőr lost 1–4. In November 1957, 25,000 fans showed up to cheer on DVTK against FTC. Unfortunately, DVTK lost the game 1–2. Further cases of ticket sales jumping through the roof whenever DVTK were hosting Ferencváros happened in 1961 (20,000), 1964 (25,000), and 1966 (27,000). In November 1968, DVTK hosted Ferencváros in front of 35,000 people. This is the home game with the highest ever attendance in DVTK's history. Between 1975 and 1980, DVTK set a streak of five consecutive sold-out games (25,000 people) against FTC. In 1982, Diósgyőr played an enthralling 2–2 draw against Ferencváros, which was attended by 22,000 people. In 1992, Ferencváros won the national championship on the last day of the season, at the DVTK-Stadium, in front of 30,000 fans, defeating the red and whites 0–2. The victory ended FTC's 11-season long national title drought. In 1998, Diósgyőr, known at the time as 'DFC' took on Ferencváros in front of 23,000 people.

The causes of the rivalry are the traditional differences between the capital, Budapest and Miskolc. This also explains why DVTK Fans have a deep disdain for most Budapest-based teams, especially FTC, their arch rivals, Újpest FC, Budapest Honvéd FC, MTK Budapest FC, III. Kerületi TVE & Vasas SC. Fans of DVTK often refer to themselves, and the city of Miskolc as a whole, as "101% Anti-Budapest. Ultras Diósgyőr also has a collection of chants, sung at games mainly against Budapest-based rivals, which are dedicated to tarnishing the city's reputation. The most notable ones of these chants are Hol az a mocskos 9. Kerület?, to the tune of FTC's most famous chant, Fradi áléó and Budapesten Mindenki'' which roughly translate to "Where is that fucking 9th District?"(because Ferencváros is the 9th district of Budapest), and My grandfather taught me, that everyone in Budapest is a gypsy . Ferencváros also happens to be the team that DVTK has faired off against the worst over the years, only managing to collect five league wins over them in the 21st century, coming in 2009, 2014, 2018, 2021 & 2024. Four DVTK players have scored a brace against FTC, Ferenc Oláh in 1976, Kulcsár & Egressy during the same game in 1998, and Seymi L'imam in 2013. L'imam is the only one who scored his brace at a home game.

=== Újpest ===
Hailing from Újpest, the 4th District of Budapest, are the 20-time Hungarian Champions, Újpest FC. The two clubs have met 123 times in the 1st division. Újpest have won 57 of those, while DVTK have emerged victorious over their purple counterparts on 22 different occasions. Between 1966 and 1999, DVTK did not win any of their home games against Újpest. Their first home win in over 33 years came in August 1999, when DVTK overcame Újpest 4–1, in front of 8,000 fans. From 2009 until 2017, The DVTK Stadium served as a true fortress whenever the team took on Újpest, with the team from capital being unable to claim a win in Miskolc in that timeframe. Between March 2012, and November 2017, DVTK won every single home game against Újpest, often with late goals, such as when Fernando scored the game's only goal in the '76th minute, in March 2012, and when Georges Griffiths scored in the '94th minute, to make it 2-1 for DVTK after going 0–1 down early on in the game in December 2014. In August 2015, DVTK were hosting Újpest, and went 0–1 down due to a penalty in the '14th minute. DVTK spent the entire regular time of the game trailing, before they turned the game around within 2 minutes, with Bognár's equalizer coming at the '92nd minute, and Tamás' match winning goal even later, in the '94th minute of extra time.

DVTK were unable to pick up a single win at the Szusza Ferenc Stadion, between 1954 and 1998. During this timeperiod, the club also suffered their heaviest ever defeat, a 9–0 loss in 1968. The streak was broken on August 8, when DVTK defeated Újpest 1–3, thanks to goals from Téger, Búzás and Szabados. Furthermore, the team was able to pick up 3 points against them away only twice in the 21st century, coming in 2006 and 2019, with Diósgyőr beating the purple and whites 0–3, and 1–2, respectively. In November 2007, UTE defeated DVTK in Miskolc 1–4, with three of the 4 Újpest goalscorers having formerly played on Diósgyőr, namely Foxi, Tisza and Sadjo Haman. Újpest is also the only other club, apart from Ferencváros, and Vasas, with whom DVTK have contested numerous cup final games (including final fours, where a mini-tournament decides the fate of the cup, when only 4 teams remained). DVTK won the cup in this format in 1977, famously beating Újpest 4–1. Conversely, Újpest have since revenged themselves, winning the 2014 Hungarian Cup Final through penalties. The sides have also met in the cup in 1942, when DVTK won 3–6, and in 1965, when DVTK progressed after a 1–1 draw, given the fact that extra time was not yet introduced in Hungary, and the team in the lower division advanced in the occasion of a draw. DVTK also knocked UTE out of the cup in 1981. DVTK were eliminated by Újpest in 1967, and 1975.

=== Budapest Honvéd ===
Another club from the capital, which is greatly despised in Miskolc is Budapest Honvéd FC. Honvéd are traditionally the fourth biggest club in the country, having won 14 national titles. The two clubs have met over 112 times in the Hungarian national league, with Budapest Honvéd being victorious in 58 of them, and DVTK winning 27 of the match-ups. The very first time the sides met in a league game was in 1940. DVTK won the match 0–1.

On 31 December 1954, DVTK lost 1–6 to Honvéd, with two of the most prolific and classiest players of the Hungarian National team, Kocsis and Puskás, taking it upon themselves to score 4 and 2 goals, respectively. From the end of the Second World War, until 1966, DVTK only managed to win two games against Honvéd, in 1957, and in 1966. The latter of which was a 2–0 victory at home, with goals from Samek and Werner. In September 1975, DVTK defeated Honvéd 4–0, with 18,000 red and white fanatics in attendance. There was also an 18-year period between 1979 and 1997, where the club was winless against the team from Southern Pest. The streak came to an end in the 1st round of the 1997/98 season, with DVTK hammering Honvéd 5–1, with 5 different goalscorers. The club's next victory over Budapest Honvéd came in April 2005, which was also a 5–1 win. István Sipeki scored his first ever Diósgyőr goal, helping DVTK to take the lead in the '6th minute, and would also go on to score the club's fifth goal that game, ending the day with a brace. Sipeki would also score in the two teams' May and August fixtures of 2007. In October 2005, DVTK defeated Honvéd 1–0 with a late goal from Ferenc Horváth. In 2006, DVTK recorded their first victory at Bozsik Stadion since 1967, with a goal from Binder Ciprian. In March 2008, DVTK defeated Honvéd 0–1, with a late goal from Japanese player Homma Kazuo. The club's next victory over Kispest came in May 2012, with DVTK coming back from 0–1, to end up winning the game 2–1, thanks to a brace from Tibor Tisza. In April 2014, Diósgyőr defeated Honvéd at the Bozsik-Stadium for the first time since 2008. Out of the "Big Four of Budapest", meaning Honvéd, Újpest, MTK & FTC, DVTK won the most league games at Honvéd's Bozsik Stadium, with 7 victories.

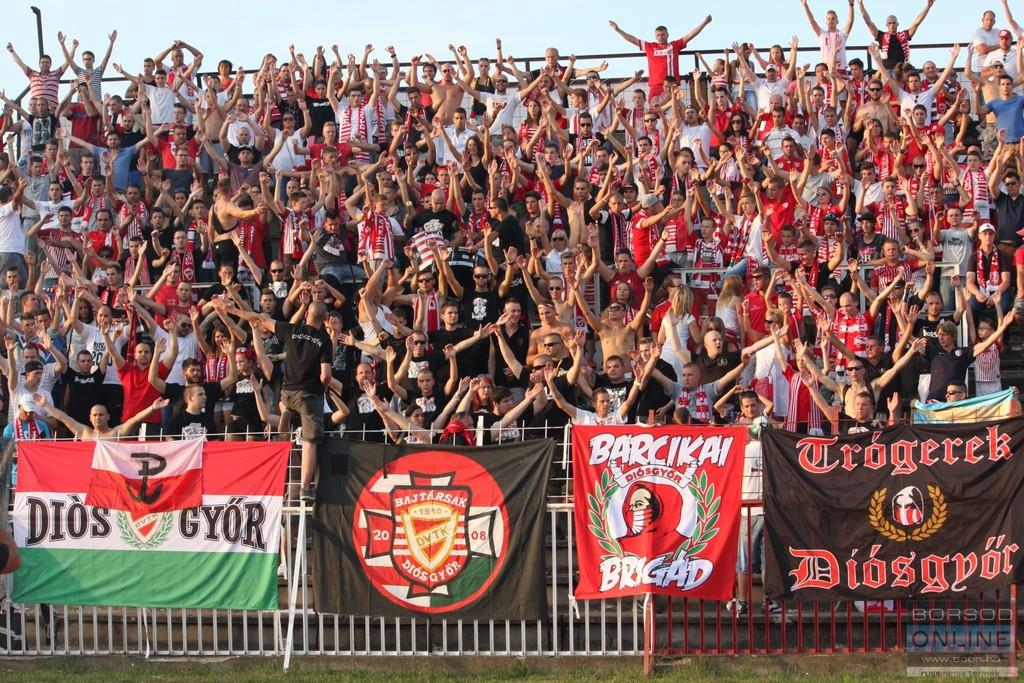
DVTK fans against Videoton

=== Fehérvár ===
Fehérvár FC, often referred to as Videoton, having been called that for the vast majority of their history, is one of the biggest rivals of DVTK, however, unlike the rest of the teams in this section, Videoton and Diósgyőr fans used to be very fond of each other, until the late 2000s. Their relationship soured, when the Fidesz–KDNP regime of Hungary, spearheaded by Prime Minister, Viktor Orbán, started pouring money disproportionately into domestic football, with some clubs, like Ferencvárosi TC, Fehérvár FC and Puskás Akadémia FC being treated favourably as opposed to the rest of the teams which the league comprised. Since then, DVTK fans have even started referring to Videoton supporters as "Nyugati tirpákok", meaning, Tirpáks of the West, with Tirpák being a derogatory term being used to describe the Slovak minority residing in Hungary, and simultaneously a term used to mock the fans of DVTK's arch rivals, Nyíregyháza Spartacus FC.

Videoton and DVTK have met 82 times in the 1st Division, with Videoton winning 44 of the matchups, while DVTK won 26 times against their friend-turned-rivals. Their first meeting was in March 1968, a game which Videoton won 1–0. DVTK's first victory over Videoton came in August 1968, when they beat the West Hungarian team 2–0 in front of 18,000 spectators. From October 1970 until August 1976, Diósgyőr was winless against Videoton. The streak was broken on 20 August 1976, when the Miskolc side beat Videoton 1–0, thanks to a late goal from Ferenc Oláh. In March 1978, DVTK beat Videoton away for only the third time in history, with a brace from Borostyán. This was followed up by a 4-year winless run against Videoton, with the club's next victory over the red and blues coming in October 1982. In May 1979, Videoton ended DVTK's year and a half long undefeated home game streak. Videoton won the game 0–1, with a goal from Ferenc Csongrádi.

In May 1992, DVTK beat Fehérvár, for the first time in 10 years, with a brace from Petcu Ion. In 1996, the teams played a 1st Division play-off tie, after DVTK finished 3rd in the 2nd division, while Videoton finished 13th in the NB1. DVTK took the lead early on, but Fehérvár ended up winning the first leg 2–1. The second leg ended 2-2, after Fehérvár equalized in the 97th minute, and kept their spot in the first division. In 1997, DVTK ended their 20-year winless run at Sóstói Stadion, with a goal by Kiser in the '82nd minute. In June 1998, Diósgyőr played Videoton in a famous 4–1 victory on the last day of the season, with DVTK cult-hero, 49 year old goalkeeper, György Veréb being subbed on in the second half. Veréb would save a penalty, and keep a clean sheet in what would be his final game for DVTK. Veréb had been part of the DVTK squad since 1968.

In September 2008, Videoton recorded their first victory at the DVTK-Stadium since 1993, as they managed to come away with a 0–1 win. They have also met in the 2014 League Cup Final, with DVTK managing to score an unlikely victory against Videoton, in front of about 6,000 Miskolc faithful. In June 2016, DVTK defeated Videoton (1–2) away, for the first time since 1998, due to a brace from Bognár. In June 2018, Diósgyőr secured their spot in the top-flight for the 2018/19 season, after defeating champions Videoton 2–1 on the last day of the season, and thanks to other results going in their favour, such as Vasas losing 3–1 at Honvéd, and Balmazújváros drawing 3–3 to Ferencváros.

== Honours ==
=== Domestic ===
==== League ====
- Nemzeti Bajnokság II:
  - Winners (8): 1945, 1949–50, 1953, 1956, 1962–63, 1973–74, 2010–11, 2022–23
  - Runners-up (3): 1965, 1990–91, 1996–97

==== Cups ====
- Magyar Kupa:
  - Winners (2): 1976–77, 1979–80
  - Runners-up (4): 1941–42, 1965, 1980–81, 2013–14
- Ligakupa:
  - Winners (1): 2013–14

== Seasons ==
=== League positions ===
As of 12 July 2025

- Between 2001–02 and 2003–04 the second-tier league called NB I/B.

== Players ==
=== Current squad ===
As of 22 September 2026

Note: Flags indicate national team as defined under FIFA eligibility rules; some limited exceptions apply. Players may hold more than one non-FIFA nationality.

No.	Pos.	Nation	Player
1	GK	HUN	Bogdán Bánhegyi
3	DF	HUN	Csaba Szatmári
5	DF	HUN	Ákos Kecskés
6	DF	HUN	Bence Bárdos
7	FW	HUN	Bence Babinszky
8	MF	HUN	László Vass
9	FW	HUN	Zoltán Medgyes (on loan from Honvéd)
10	MF	HUN	Gábor Molnár
11	FW	HUN	Norbert Gálfi
17	FW	HUN	Niklas Krone
18	MF	HUN	László Kiss
19	MF	HUN	Balázs Szabó
20	MF	HUN	Ágoston Bényei

No.	Pos.	Nation	Player
21	MF	HUN	Tamás Galántai
22	DF	HUN	Szilárd Bokros
23	FW	HUN	Áron Borvető
24	GK	HUN	Bence Dojcsák
25	MF	HUN	Gergő Holdampf (captain)
26	DF	HUN	Milán Szekszárdi (on loan from Paksi)
31	GK	HUN	Gábor Megyeri
47	FW	HUN	Márk Mucsányi
64	DF	HUN	Ruben Farkas
69	MF	UKR	Nazar Kovalenko
71	DF	HUN	Marcel Varga
82	DF	HUN	Bálint Kiss
86	DF	HUN	Zsombor Szlifka
99	GK	HUN	Dávid Gróf

=== Out on loan ===
Note: Flags indicate national team as defined under FIFA eligibility rules; some limited exceptions apply. Players may hold more than one non-FIFA nationality.

No. / Pos. / Nation / Player; — / DF / HUN / Vencel Lajcsik (at Budafok until 30 June 2026)	No. / Pos. / Nation / Player; — / FW / HUN / Szabolcs Sáreczki (at Mezőkövesd until 30 June 2026)

== Non-playing staff ==
=== Board of directors ===
Position	Name
Sporting Director	(Hungary) Richárd Vincze
Chairman	(Hungary) Gergely Sántha

=== Management ===
As of 9 May 2026

Position	Name
Head coach	(Hungary) Péter Takács
Assistant coach	(Hungary) Zsolt Icsó
Assistant coach	(Hungary) István Kriston
Fitness coach	(Hungary) Attila Hanák
Goalkeeping Coach	(Hungary) János Tuska
Performance Coach	(Hungary) László Dobó
Video Analytics	(Hungary) Krisztián Póti
Data Analytics	(Hungary) Botond Bakó
Team Doctor	(Hungary) István dr. Csákányi
Team Doctor	(Hungary) Zoltán dr. Németh
Masseur	(Hungary) Márton Nagy
Masseur	(Hungary) Márton Vígh
Physiotherapist	(Hungary) Dániel Lukács
Physiotherapist	(Hungary) Ádám Peák
Sports Rehabilitation Coach	(Hungary) Péter Erdélyi
Technical director	(Hungary) Bence Hegedűs

== Ownership ==
On 7 January 2021, Olivér Mátyás Magyar became the owner of the club.

On 4 November 2024, Endre Bajúsz, sport director, was sacked. On 7 November 2024, it was announced that Csenger Horváth is the new sport director of the club. He was dismissed on 6 June 2025. In the same month Zoltán Kovács got announced but he was also dismissed on 14 March 2026. On 17 March 2026 the newest and also current sporting director Richárd Vincze was announced.

== All-time records ==
The all-time top scorer of the club is Zoltán Dobó with 100 goals to his name. He played for DVTK between 1952 and 1954, and again, for a single season, between 1956 and 1957. The player who donned the red and white kit of DVTK the most times is József Salamon, with 375 appearances for the city of steel. He played for DVTK in two stints, first between 1966 and 1980, and then again from 1982 until '83. The player with the most top-flight goals for DVTK is András Horváth. He played for the club between 1967 and 1976, and in that timeperiod, he was on the scoresheet 64 times. During that timeframe, he was the highest scoring player of the club in the league for 6 out of the 7 seasons he played there, with 5 of them coming consecutively. The only other Diósgyőr player to outscore his fellow DVTK-teammates in 4 or more consecutive seasons, was Mihály Borostyán, who achieved this feat between 1980 and 1984. Borostyán played for DVTK between 1975 and 1985, scoring 55 goals in the process. The prestigious award of player with the most top-flight goals in a single season for DVTK goes to Zoltán Fazekas, who hit the net 20 times during the 1941/42 season. He played for DVTK between 1939 and 1944, and managed to score 55 times.

Players with the most top-flight appearances for DVTK

Number of games	Player
375	József Salamon
350	Ferenc Oláh
291	János Görgei
287	György Veréb
269	Imre Hajas
266	László Fekete
247	György Tatár

=== Players with the most top-flight goals for DVTK ===
Goals scored	Player
64	András Horváth
63	Ferenc Oláh
55	Mihály Borostyán, Zoltán Fazekas
51	György Tatár
46	János Füzér
39	István Turbéki

Goals	Player
33	László Fekete, László Vass
31	Ferenc Sikora
30	Tibor Tisza
28	János Görgei
27	Zoltán Dobó, Lajos Szurgent, Gábor Egressy
26	Sándor Fükő

The coach who was in charge of DVTK for the longest time was Géza Szabó, who managed DVTK between 1974 and 1980, and sat on DVTK's bench on over 210 different occasions. He led the pride of Miskolc to two different National Cup Wins (in 1977 and 1980), and also to its highest ever league finish, 3rd, in 1979. During his tenure, the team collected 68 wins altogether in the league.

== Statistics ==
=== Record departures ===
	Player	To	Fee	Year
1.	(Hungary) Tamás Kádár	(Poland) Lech Poznań	€450 000	2015
2.	(Hungary) Ákos Elek	(China) Changchun Yatai	€200 000	2015
3.	(Central African Republic) Foxi Kéthévoama	(Hungary) Újpest	€200 000	2008
4.	(Hungary) László Köteles	(Belgium) KRC Genk	€150 000	2011
5.	(Hungary) Ádám Balajti	(Hungary) Debrecen	€140 000	2011

=== Record arrivals ===
	Player	To	Fee	Year
1.	(Hungary) Gyula Hegedűs	(Hungary) Debrecen	€200 000	2006
2.	(Hungary) Péter Bajzát	(Hungary) Győr	€150 000	2009
3.	(Romania) István Fülöp	(Romania) Botoșani	€100 000	2017
4.	(Hungary) Gábor Kovács	(Hungary) Paks	€100 000	2015
5.	(Hungary) István Bognár	(Hungary) Mezőkövesd	€100 000	2014

== See also ==
- History of Diósgyőri VTK
- List of Diósgyőri VTK seasons
- Diósgyőri VTK in European football
- List of Diósgyőri VTK managers

== Sources ==
- Lajos Varga: Diósgyőri Futballtörténet (Diósgyőr Soccerhistory)
