= 1976–77 Magyar Kupa =

Tournament details
- Country: Hungary

Final positions
- Champions: Diósgyőri VTK
- Runners-up: Ferencvárosi TC

The 1976–77 Magyar Kupa (English: Hungarian Cup) was the 37th season of Hungary's annual knock-out cup football competition. The Finals were played in a round-robin tournament format.

== Finals ==
13 June 1977
17:00 (UTC+2)

Vasas SC	5–0	Ferencvárosi TC
Gass 14'; Müller 20', 54'; Török 32'; Várady 62'	Report

Városi stadion, Veszprém
Attendance: 13,000
Referee: (Hungary)
14 June 1977
17:00 (UTC+2)

Diósgyőri VTK	4–1	Újpesti Dózsa SC
Tatár 8'; Görgei 19', 45', 80'	Report	Bíró 64'

Városi stadion, Gyöngyös
Attendance: 5,000
Referee: György Müncz (Hungary)
15 June 1977
17:00 (UTC+2)

Ferencvárosi TC	3–0	Diósgyőri VTK
Mészöly 32'; Magyar 59', 85'	Report

Városi stadion, Eger
Attendance: 5,000
Referee: Béla Nagy (Hungary)
15 June 1977
17:00 (UTC+2)

Újpesti Dózsa SC	5–3 (a.e.t.)	Vasas SC
Bene 8'; Nagy 24'; Kellner 33'; Kerekes 97'; Fazekas 101'	Report	Várady 4' (red card) 98'; Gass 27'; Izsó 47'; Kovács (red card) 115'

TBA
Attendance: TBA
Referee: TBA (Hungary)
18 June 1977
17:00 (UTC+2)

Diósgyőri VTK	1–0	Vasas SC
Tatár 84'	Report

Városi Stadion, Hatvan
Attendance: 7,000
Referee: Lajos Mohácsi (Hungary)

== See also ==
- 1976–77 Nemzeti Bajnokság I
