= 1979–80 Magyar Kupa =

Tournament details
- Country: Hungary

Final positions
- Champions: Diósgyőri VTK
- Runners-up: Vasas SC

The 1979–80 Magyar Kupa (English: Hungarian Cup) was the 40th season of Hungary's annual knock-out cup football competition.

== Final ==
21 May 1980
20:00 (UTC+2)

| Diósgyőri VTK | 3–1 | Vasas SC |
|---|---|---|
| Kutasi 41'; Fekete 54'; Szalai 84' | Report | Kiss 82' |

Stadion Városi, Veszprém
Attendance: 16,000
Referee: Károly Palotai (Hungary)

== See also ==
- 1979–80 Nemzeti Bajnokság I
