= Imre Mathesz =

Hungarian footballer (1937–2010)

Personal information
- Date of birth: 25 March 1937
- Place of birth: Budapest, Hungary
- Date of death: 6 December 2010 (aged 73)
- Place of death: Mernye, Hungary
- Height: 1.74 m (5 ft 9 in)
- Position: Midfielder

Senior career*
Years	Team	Apps	(Gls)
1957–1969	Vasas SC	248	(28)

International career
1964–1967	Hungary	12	(0)

Managerial career
- 1973–1977: Kaposvári Rákóczi
- * Club domestic league appearances and goals

Imre Mathesz (25 March 1937 – 6 December 2010) was a Hungarian football player and coach.

== Playing career ==
Mathesz, who played as a midfielder, played club football for Vasas SC.

He represented Hungary at the 1966 FIFA World Cup, making two appearances in qualifying and two in the tournament itself. He also played in two qualifying games for the 1968 European Championship.

== Coaching career ==
After retiring as a player, Mathesz became a football manager, and took charge of Kaposvári Rákóczi in 1973.

== Later life and death ==
Mathesz died in a car crash on 6 December 2010, at the age of 73.
