= 2024–25 Diósgyőri VTK season =

Diósgyőr
2024–25 season
- Chairman: Gergely Sántha
- Manager: Valdas Dambrauskas (From 26 February 2025)
- Stadium: Diósgyőri Stadion
- Nemzeti Bajnokság I: 6th
- Magyar Kupa: Round of 32
- Top goalscorer: League: Edomwonyi (7); All: Edomwonyi (7)
- Highest home attendance: 10,344 v Ferencváros, 30 March 2025, NB I, R25
- Lowest home attendance: 3,645 v Puskás Akadémia, 1 March 2025, NB I, R22
- Average home league attendance: 5,689
- Biggest win: 4–2 v Kazincbarcika (A), 16 Sep. 2024, MK, R. of 64, 2–0 v Nyíregyháza (A), 5 Oct. 2024, NB I, R9, 3–1 v Debrecen (H), 30 Nov. 2024, NB I, R15
- Biggest defeat: 0–4 v MTK (A), 21 Feb. 2025, NB I, R21
- All statistics correct as of 24 May 2025.

The 2024–25 season is Diósgyőri VTK's 57th competitive season, 2nd consecutive season in the Nemzeti Bajnokság I and 124th year in existence as a football club. In addition to the domestic league, Diósgyőr participate in this season's editions of the Magyar Kupa.

== Kits ==
Supplier: 2Rule / Sponsor: Tippmix / Hell Energy Drink / Shirt back sponsor: Apollo Tyres / Sleeve sponsor: Borsodi / Volkswagen-Miskolc Autó / Short sponsor: Duna Aszfalt / Borsodi / Tippmix

Home	Away	Third

Goalkeeper^{1}	Goalkeeper^{2}	Goalkeeper^{3}

=== Kit usage ===
We indicate in parentheses the number of round.

Kit	Combination							
Kit	Combination	Total			Nemzeti Bajnokság I		Magyar Kupa	
Kit	Combination	Season	Home	Away	Home	Away	Home	Away
Home	Red body, white sleeves, red shorts and red socks.	22	15	7	PAK(1) FER(3) KEC(5) GYO(6) ZAL(8) MTK(10) FEH(13) DEB(15) UJP(18) NYI(20) PUS(22) PAK(23) FER(25) KEC(27)GYO(28)	DEB(4) UJP(7) PUS(11) PAK(12) ZAL(19) MTK(21)		KAZ(R64)
Away	White shirt, white shorts and white socks.	5		5		FEH(2) NYI(9) KEC(16) FEH(24)		FEH(R32)
Third	Black shirt, black shorts and black socks.	3		3		FER(14) GYO(17) DEB(26)		
Goalkeeper^{1}	Yellow shirt with black stripe, yellow shorts and yellow socks.	19	7	12	PAK(1) ZAL(8) DEB(15) NYI(20) PUS(22) PAK(23) KEC(27)	FEH(2) DEB(4) NYI(9) PUS(11) FER(14) GYO(17) ZAL(19) MTK(21) FEH(24) DEB(26)		KAZ(R64) FEH(R32)
Goalkeeper^{2}	Black shirt with white stripe, black shorts and black socks.	10	8	2	FER(3) KEC(5) GYO(6) MTK(10) FEH(13) UJP(18) FER(25) GYO(28)	UJP(7) PAK(12)		
Goalkeeper^{3}	Blue shirt, blue shorts and blue socks.	1		1		KEC(16)		

DEB: Debrecen; FEH: Fehérvár; FER: Ferencváros; GYO: Győr; KAZ: Kazincbarcika; KEC: Kecskemét; MTK: MTK Budapest; NYI: Nyíregyháza; PAK: Paks; PUS: Puskás Akadémia; UJP: Újpest; ZAL: Zalaegerszeg;
R64: Round of 64; R32: Round of 32;

== First team squad ==
As of 13 February 2025

Note: Flags indicate national team as defined under FIFA eligibility rules; some limited exceptions apply. Players may hold more than one non-FIFA nationality.

No.	Pos.	Nation	Player
1	GK	HUN	Bogdán Bánhegyi
12	GK	UKR	Artem Odyntsov
30	GK	CRO	Karlo Sentić
44	GK	SRB	Branislav Danilović
51	GK	HUN	Barnabás Simon (on loan from (Hungary) Paks)
76	GK	HUN	Barnabás Németh
3	DF	HUN	Csaba Szatmári
4	DF	DEN	Marco Lund
5	DF	BUL	Bozhidar Chorbadzhiyski
6	DF	HUN	Bence Bárdos
11	DF	HUN	Dániel Gera (vice-captain)
15	DF	BIH	Siniša Saničanin
26	DF	SRB	Uroš Drezgić (on loan from (Russia) Rubin Kazan)
72	DF	HUN	Kevin Kállai
85	DF	HUN	Bence Szakos
16	MF	HUN	Bence Komlósi

No.	Pos.	Nation	Player
20	MF	HUN	Ágoston Bényei
21	MF	BLR	Vladislav Klimovich
22	MF	CIV	Christ Tiéhi
25	MF	HUN	Gergő Holdampf (captain)
50	MF	ESP	Álex Vallejo
66	MF	HUN	Bálint Ferencsik
68	MF	HUN	Zétény Varga (on loan from (Hungary) Ferencváros)
7	FW	MNE	Marko Rakonjac (on loan from (Russia) Lokomotiv Moscow)
10	FW	HUN	Gábor Jurek
17	FW	NED	Elton Acolatse
34	FW	NGR	Bright Edomwonyi
67	FW	HUN	Szabolcs Sáreczki
70	FW	HUN	Alen Skribek (on loan from (Hungary) Paks)
94	FW	SLO	Rudi Požeg Vancaš
96	FW	HUN	Marcell Huszár (on loan from (Hungary) Győr)

== Transfers ==
=== Summer ===
In: Note: Flags indicate national team as defined under FIFA eligibility rules; some limited exceptions apply. Players may hold more than one non-FIFA nationality.

No.	Pos.	Nation	Player
19	MF	HUN	Máté Herbák (from (Germany) Bergfried Leverkusen)
7	FW	MNE	Marko Rakonjac (on loan from (Serbia) Topola)
96	FW	HUN	Marcell Huszár (on loan from (Hungary) Győri ETO FC)
26	DF	SRB	Uroš Drezgić (on loan from (Russia) Rubin Kazan)
15	DF	BIH	Siniša Saničanin (from (Serbia) Partizan)
68	FW	HUN	Zétény Varga (on loan from (Hungary) Ferencváros)
30	GK	CRO	Karlo Sentić (from (Kazakhstan) Ordabasy)
75	FW	MAR	Moha Rharsalla (from (Slovakia) Košice)
99	FW	MNE	Nikola Gluščević (from (Slovenia) Dekani)
33	DF	IRL	Val Adedokun (on loan from (England) Brentford)

Out: Note: Flags indicate national team as defined under FIFA eligibility rules; some limited exceptions apply. Players may hold more than one non-FIFA nationality.

No.	Pos.	Nation	Player
7	MF	HUN	István Csirmaz (to (Hungary) Mezőkövesd)
28	FW	BRA	Pernambuco (End of contract)
—	MF	HUN	Ádám Szamosi (to (Hungary) Kazincbarcika)
32	GK	HUN	Balázs Tóth (to (Hungary) Nyíregyháza)
27	FW	HUN	Levente Szabó (to (Germany) Eintracht Braunschweig)
37	DF	CZE	Ondřej Bačo (to (Israel) Ironi Tiberias)
16	MF	HUN	Tamás Kispál (End of contract)
8	MF	HUN	Borisz Tóth (End of contract)
36	DF	HUN	Ádám Viczián (End of contract)
15	DF	NGR	Godfrey Stephen (End of contract)
—	FW	GAB	Jérémie Obounet (to (Spain) Antequera)

=== Winter ===
In: Note: Flags indicate national team as defined under FIFA eligibility rules; some limited exceptions apply. Players may hold more than one non-FIFA nationality.

No.	Pos.	Nation	Player
72	DF	HUN	Kevin Kállai (from (Hungary) Mezőkövesd)
70	FW	HUN	Alen Skribek (on loan from (Hungary) Paks)
22	DF	CIV	Christ Tiéhi (from (England) Rotherham United)
51	GK	HUN	Barnabás Simon (on loan from (Hungary) Paks)

Out: Note: Flags indicate national team as defined under FIFA eligibility rules; some limited exceptions apply. Players may hold more than one non-FIFA nationality.

No.	Pos.	Nation	Player
19	MF	HUN	Máté Herbák (Mutual agreement)
75	FW	MAR	Moha Rharsalla (Mutual agreement)
33	DF	IRL	Val Adedokun (Mutual agreement)
59	MF	ROU	Doru Popadiuc (Mutual agreement)
9	MF	GRE	Argyris Kampetsis (Mutual agreement)
72	DF	HUN	Dániel Farkas (Mutual agreement)
29	FW	ARG	Franchu (to (Cyprus) Karmiotissa)
99	FW	MNE	Nikola Gluščević (Mutual agreement)
87	FW	HUN	Vince Fekete (on loan to (Hungary) Putnok)
—	GK	HUN	Nándor Derényi (on loan to (Hungary) Putnok)

=== Out on loan ===
Note: Flags indicate national team as defined under FIFA eligibility rules; some limited exceptions apply. Players may hold more than one non-FIFA nationality.

No.	Pos.	Nation	Player
4	DF	HUN	Szilárd Bokros (loan to (Slovakia) Košice)
22	GK	HUN	Bogdán Bánhegyi (loan to (Hungary) Kazincbarcika)
14	MF	HUN	Gergő Csatári (loan to (Hungary) Kazincbarcika)
87	FW	HUN	Vince Fekete (loan to (Hungary) Putnok)
—	GK	HUN	Nándor Derényi (loan to (Hungary) Putnok)

=== Contract extension ===
Note: Flags indicate national team as defined under FIFA eligibility rules; some limited exceptions apply. Players may hold more than one non-FIFA nationality.

No.	Pos.	Nation	Player
94	FW	SLO	Rudi Požeg Vancaš (until 30 June 2026)
3	DF	SLO	Csaba Szatmári (until 30 June 2027)
67	FW	HUN	Szabolcs Sáreczki (until 30 June 2028)
17	FW	NED	Elton Acolatse (until 30 June 2027)

== Non-playing staff ==
=== Board of directors ===
Position	Name
Chief executive officer	(Hungary) Csenger Horváth

=== Management ===
As of 26 February 2025

Position	Name
Head coach	(Lithuania) Valdas Dambrauskas
Assistant coach	(Italy) Valerio Zuddas
Fitness coach	(Hungary) Kornél Bubori
Goalkeeping Coach	(Lithuania) Justinas Gasiūnas
Goalkeeping Coach	(Hungary) János Tuska
Performance Coach	(Hungary) László Dobó
Video Analytics	(Hungary) Krisztián Póti
Data Analytics	(Hungary) Botond Bakó
Team Doctor	(Hungary) István dr. Csákányi
Team Doctor	(Hungary) Zoltán dr. Németh
Masseur	(Hungary) Márton Nagy
Masseur	(Hungary) Márton Vígh
Physiotherapist	(Hungary) Dániel Lukács
Physiotherapist	(Hungary) Ádám Peák
Sports Rehabilitation Coach	(Hungary) Péter Erdélyi
Technical director	(Hungary) Bence Hegedűs

=== Managerial changes ===
Outgoing manager	Manner of departure	Date of vacancy	Position in table	Incoming manager	Date of appointment	Ref.
(Serbia) Vladimir Radenković	Mutual consent	19 February 2025	4th	(Hungary) Richárd Vincze^{c}	19 February 2025	
(Hungary) Richárd Vincze^{c}	End of caretaker spell	26 February 2025	5th	(Lithuania) Valdas Dambrauskas	26 February 2025	

^{c} = caretaker

== Friendlies ==
Win Draw Loss Fixtures

=== Pre-season ===
25 June 2024 Friendly	Diósgyőr	2–0	(Hungary) Eger (NB III)	Miskolc
18:00 CEST	Á. Bényei 42'; Szatmári 50'	Report		Stadium: DVTK Training Centre; Attendance: 0 Referee: Róbert Nagy; Assistant referees: Ákos Berényi, Péter Márkus
Note: DVTK 1st half: Odyntsov — Farkas, Chorbadzhiyski, Lund, Demeter — Ferencsik, Komlósi, Bényei — Jurek, Edomwonyi, Kampetsis • DVTK 2nd half: Sentić — D. Gera, Bačo, Szatmári, Stephen — Holdampf, Komlósi, Franchu — Herbák, Fekete, Kampetsis

29 June 2024 Friendly	Diósgyőr	5–0	(Hungary) Putnok (NB III)	Miskolc
18:00 CEST	Rakonjac 21'; Jurek 40', 43'; Herbák 76'; Á. Bényei 86'	Report		Stadium: DVTK Training Centre; Attendance: 0 Referee: Márk Szigetvéri; Assistant referees: Péter Márkus, Márton Gergely
Note: DVTK 1st half: Sentić — D. Gera, Chorbadzhiyski, Lund, Demeter — Franchu, Komlósi, Požeg Vancaš — Jurek, Rakonjac, Rharsalla • DVTK 2nd half: Odyntsov — Farkas, Szatmári, Komlósi, Demeter — Ferencsik, Holdampf, Bényei — Herbák, Fekete, Kampetsis

4 July 2024 Friendly	(Romania) Universitatea Cluj (Romanian I)	0–2	Diósgyőr	(Austria) Bad Wimsbach
16:30 CEST	Suciu (yellow card) 54'; Thalisson (yellow card) 66'	Report	Szatmári (yellow card) 52'; D. Gera (yellow card) 84'; Edomwonyi 84' (pen.), 86'	Stadium: Hofmaninger Stadion; Attendance: 100; Referee: Markus Greinecker; Assistant referees: Asim Basic, Christoph Kaiblinger
Note: DVTK: Odyntsov — D. Gera, Szatmári, Lund, Bárdos — Holdampf, Komlósi, Rharsalla — Á. Bényei, Rakonjac, Požeg Vancaš

11 July 2024 Friendly	(Romania) M. Ciuc (Romanian II)	1–0	Diósgyőr	(Austria) Mauer bei Amstetten
17:00 CEST	Dolny 1'	Report	Kárándi (yellow card) 22'	Stadium: Union Mauer-Öhling Stadion; Attendance: 100; Referee: Maximilian Weiß; Assistant referees: Lukas Steingruber, Paul Bölling
Note: DVTK: Sentić — Ferencsik, Drezgić, Chorbadzhiyski, Saničanin — Klimovich, Vallejo (Bárdos (substituted on) 69'), Franchu — Kampetsis, Edomwonyi, Požeg Vancaš

12 July 2024 Friendly	(Germany) F. Düsseldorf (2. Bundesliga)	4–0	Diósgyőr	(Austria) Bad Wimsbach
17:00 CEST	Hoffmann 28'; Iyoha 40'; Sobottka 53'; Niemiec 55'; Quarshie (yellow card) 75'	Report	D. Gera (yellow card) 72'	Stadium: Hofmaninger Stadion; Attendance: 100; Referee: Manfred Erlinger; Assistant referees: Slavomir Schlesinger, Bruno Ljubicic
Note: DVTK: Odyntsov (Danilović (substituted on) 58') — D. Gera, Szatmári, Lund, Bárdos — Rharsalla, Holdampf, Komlósi (Ferencsik (substituted on) 81') — Á. Bényei, Rakonjac (Gluščević (substituted on) 78'), Huszár (Z. Varga (substituted on) 58')

20 July 2024 Friendly	Diósgyőr	3–1	(Slovakia) Michalovce (Slovak I)	Miskolc
18:00 CEST	Z. Varga 5'; Vallejo (yellow card) 25'; Rakonjac 70'; Holdampf (yellow card) 81'; Á. Bényei 89'	Report	Zubairu (yellow card) 51'; Arevalo 62'; Taraduda (yellow card) 80'; Shimamura (yellow card) 86'	Stadium: Diósgyőri Stadion; Attendance: 850
Note: DVTK: Odyntsov (Sentić (substituted on) 46') — D. Gera, Szatmári, Lund, Saničanin — Klimovich, Vallejo, Požeg Vancaš — Z. Varga, Rakonjac, Rharsalla • DVTK from 65th min.: Sentić — D. Gera (Gluščević (substituted on) 89'), Bárdos, Chorbadzhiyski, Drezgić — Á. Bényei, Holdampf, Požeg Vancaš (Kampetsis (substituted on) 74') — Huszár, Rakonjac (V. Fekete (substituted on) 74'), Franchu

=== In-season ===
Winter training camp in Spain, between 12–24 January 2025.

13 January 2025 Friendly	Wolfsberger AC (Austrian I) (Austria)	3–3	Diósgyőr	Marbella, Spain
18:00 CET	Zukić 3', 49'; Ballo 44'	Report	Á. Bényei 16' (yellow card) 69'; Rakonjac 55', 71'; Komlósi (yellow card) 87'	Stadium: Football Center; Attendance: 50; Referee: Marius Grotta (Norway); Assistant referees: Jim Dyb, Alexander Jæger
Note: DVTK 1st half: Danilović — Szatmári, Lund, Bárdos, Saničanin — Á. Bényei, Vallejo, Klimovich — Jurek, Edomwonyi, Požeg Vancaš • DVTK 2nd half: Odyntsov — Kállai, Chorbadzhiyski, Saničanin, Demeter — Á. Bényei, Vallejo (Komlósi (substituted on) 69'), Klimovich (Sáreczki (substituted on) 78') — Jurek (Gluščević (substituted on) 82'), Rakonjac, Huszár • Coach: Vladimir Radenković

16 January 2025 Friendly	Magpies (Gibraltar I)	1–5	Diósgyőr	Sotogrande, Spain
11:00 CET	Forján 41'	Report	Jurek 2', 27'; Rakonjac 10'; Edomwonyi 16'; Acolatse 71'	Stadium: Santa María Polo Club; Referee: Diego García (Spain); Assistant referees: Luis Chacón, Jesús España
Note: DVTK 1st half: Danilović — Kállai, Lund, Saničanin, Bárdos — Klimovich, Komlósi, Rakonjac — Acolatse, Edomwonyi, Jurek • DVTK 2nd half: Branislav Danilović (Németh (substituted on) 60') — Kállai (Szakos (substituted on) 60'), Szatmári, Chorbadzhiyski, Demeter — Tiéhi, Komlósi (Skribek (substituted on) 60'), Rakonjac — Acolatse (Sáreczki (substituted on) 74'), Edomwonyi (Gluščević (substituted on) 60'), Huszár • Coach: Vladimir Radenković

19 January 2025 Friendly	Raków Częstochowa (Polish I) (Poland)	2–0	Diósgyőr	Marbella, Spain
16:00 CET	Brunes 42'; Baráth 54'	Report	D. Gera (yellow card) 84'	Stadium: Banús Football Center; Attendance: 50; Referee: Juan Antonio López Romero (Spain); Assistant referees: Isabel Buendía Núñez, Antonio Cabrera Fábrega
Note: DVTK: Odyntsov — Szakos (D. Gera (substituted on) 55'), Szatmári, Saničanin, Bárdos — Á. Bényei (Tiéhi (substituted on) 62'), Vallejo, Rakonjac (Klimovich (substituted on) 62') — Acolatse, Edomwonyi, Požeg Vancaš (Huszár (substituted on) 55') • Coach: Vladimir Radenković

21 January 2025 Friendly	Hammarby (Swedish I) (Sweden)	3–1	Diósgyőr	Marbella, Spain
15:30 CET	Clemmensen 16', 27'; Karlsson 49'; Gyamfi (yellow card) 79'	Report	Vagić 58' (o.g.)	Stadium: Banús Football Center; Attendance: 50; Referee: Alfonso Mármol Cabrera (Spain); Assistant referees: Alfonso De Vera Martínez, Iván Alcántara García
Note: DVTK: Bánhegyi (Danilović (substituted on) 46') — Kállai, Chorbadzhiyski, Bárdos, Demeter — Tiéhi, Komlósi — Á. Bényei, Skribek (Szakos (substituted on) 57'), Sáreczki — Huszár • Coach: Vladimir Radenković

22 January 2025 Friendly	LNZ Cherkasy (Ukrainian I) (Ukraine)	0–1	Diósgyőr	Estepona, Spain
16:00 CET	Topalov (yellow card) 3'; Dajko (yellow card) 90'	Report	Acolatse (yellow card) 57'; Saničanin 63'	Stadium: Atalaya Football Center; Attendance: 30; Referee: León Montaraz Rojo (Spain); Assistant referees: Adrián Peña González, Antonio Jesús Iglesias Cabello
Note: DVTK: Danilović — D. Gera, Szatmári, Lund, Saničanin — Klimovich, Vallejo, Rakonjac (Tiéhi (substituted on) 78') — Acolatse, Edomwonyi, Jurek • Coach: Vladimir Radenković

23 March 2025 Friendly	TSC (Bačka Topola) (Serbian I) (Serbia)	1–4	Diósgyőr	Mezőkövesd
13:00 CET	Milosavljević 4'	Report	Rakonjac 24'; Požeg Vancaš (penalty missed) 62'; Edomwonyi 71'; Bárdos 87'	Stadium: Zsóry Training Center; Attendance: 0 (Closed doors)

== Competitions ==
=== Overall record ===
In italics, we indicate the Last match and the Final position achieved in competition(s) that have not yet been completed.

Competition	First match	Last match	Starting round	Final position	Record							
Competition	First match	Last match	Starting round	Final position	Pld	W	D	L	GF	GA	GD	Win %
Nemzeti Bajnokság I	28 July 2024	24 May 2025	Matchday 1	6th	33	11	11	11	43	51	−8	33.33
Magyar Kupa	16 September 2024	30 October 2024	Round of 64	Round of 32	2	1	0	1	5	4	+1	50.00
Total					35	12	11	12	48	55	−7	34.29

Last updated: 24 May 2025
Source: Soccerway

=== Nemzeti Bajnokság I ===
==== League table ====
Pos	Team	Pld	W	D	L	GF	GA	GD	Pts	Qualification or relegation
4	Győr	33	14	11	8	49	37	+12	53	Qualification for the Conference League second qualifying round
5	MTK	33	13	7	13	53	47	+6	46	
6	Diósgyőr	33	11	11	11	43	51	−8	44	
7	Újpest	33	9	14	10	38	44	−6	41	
8	Nyíregyháza	33	9	9	15	31	52	−21	36	

Source: Hungarian Football Federation (in Hungarian)
Rules for classification: 1) Points; 2) Matches won; 3) Goal difference; 4) Goals scored; 5) Head-to-head points; 6) Head-to-head goal difference; 7) Fair play ranking; 8) Drawing of lots.

==== Results summary ====
Overall								Home						Away					
Pld	W	D	L	GF	GA	GD	Pts	W	D	L	GF	GA	GD	W	D	L	GF	GA	GD
33	11	11	11	43	51	−8	44	7	5	5	21	22	−1	4	6	6	22	29	−7

Last updated: 24 May 2025.
Source: Soccerway statistics

==== Results by round ====
Round	1	2	3	4	5	6	7	8	9	10	11	12	13	14	15	16	17	18	19	20	21	22	23	24	25	26	27	28	29	30	31	32	33
Ground	H	A	H	A	H	H	A	H	A	H	A	A	H	A	H	A	A	H	A	H	A	H	H	A	H	A	H	H	A	H	A	H	A
Result	D	L	L	W	W	D	D	W	W	L	D	W	W	D	W	D	W	D	L	L	L	W	L	D	D	L	W	L	D	D	L	W	L
Position	5	9	11	9	6	8	7	5	5	6	6	5	5	5	4	4	3	3	4	4	5	4	5	5	6	6	6	6	6	6	6	6	6
Points	1	1	1	4	7	8	9	12	15	15	16	19	22	23	26	27	30	31	31	31	31	34	34	35	36	36	39	39	40	41	41	44	44
Manager	R	R	R	R	R	R	R	R	R	R	R	R	R	R	R	R	R	R	R	R	V	D	D	D	D	D	D	D	D	D	D	D	D

Updated to match(es) played on 24 May 2025. Source:
A = Away; H = Home; W = Win; D = Draw; L = Loss
Notes: Manager: • R Radenković • V Vincze (caretaker) • D Dambrauskas

==== Matches ====
Win Draw Loss Postponed

28 July 2024 1	Diósgyőr	2–2	Paks	Miskolc
18:50 CEST	Rakonjac 40'; Á. Bényei (yellow card) 48'; Edomwonyi (yellow card) 77' (goal) 86'; Saničanin (yellow card) 90+2'	Report	K. Kovács (yellow card) 36'; Böde 47'; Windecker 81' (pen.)	Stadium: Diósgyőri Stadion; Attendance: 6,137; Referee: Balázs Berke (referee); Assistant referees: P. Garai, J. Aradi
Note: DVTK: Odyntsov — D. Gera, Szatmári, Lund, Saničanin — Á. Bényei (Ferencsik (substituted on) 89'), Holdampf (c), Rharsalla (Vallejo (substituted on) 66') — Z. Varga (Franchu (substituted on) 66'), Rakonjac (Edomwonyi (substituted on) 73'), Požeg Vancaš (Klimovich (substituted on) 66') • Coach: Radenković

3 August 2024 2	Fehérvár	3–1	Diósgyőr	Székesfehérvár
16:00 CEST	Serafimov 1'; Gradišar (yellow card) 11'; Babos 75'; Katona 90+4'	Report	Franchu 20'; Z. Varga (yellow card) 87'	Stadium: Sóstói Stadion; Attendance: 3,063; Referee: Csaba Pintér; Assistant referees: P. Kóbor, J. Aradi
Note: DVTK: Odyntsov — Lund, Chorbadzhiyski, Rakonjac (Edomwonyi (substituted on) 60'), D. Gera (c), Saničanin — Klimovich (Á. Bényei (substituted on) 71'), Franchu (Ferencsik (substituted on) 71'), Vallejo (Holdampf (substituted on) 6') — Z. Varga, Huszár (Požeg Vancaš (substituted on) 60') • Coach: Radenković

10 August 2024 3	Diósgyőr	0–2	Ferencváros	Miskolc
16:00 CEST	Saničanin (yellow card) 20'; Szatmári (yellow card) 42'; Edomwonyi (yellow card) 64'; D. Gera (yellow card) 83'; Lund (yellow card) 90+5'	Report	Ben Romdhane 21' (pen.), 90+3'	Stadium: Diósgyőri Stadion; Attendance: 8,050; Referee: Mihály Káprály; Assistant referees: B. Szert, R. Horváth
Note: DVTK: Sentić — D. Gera, Lund, Szatmári, Saničanin — Holdampf (c) — Z. Varga (Á. Bényei (substituted on) 60' (substituted off) 81' (Fekete (substituted on) 81'), Klimovich (Jurek (substituted on) 78'), Edomwonyi, Franchu (Rharsalla (substituted on) 60') — Rakonjac (Kampetsis (substituted on) 60') • Coach: Radenković

17 August 2024 4	Debrecen	0–1	Diósgyőr	Debrecen
17:00 CEST	Silue (yellow card) 24'; Szuhodovszki (yellow card) 28'; Pëllumbi (yellow card) 42' (yellow-red card) 45+1'; Lagator (yellow card) 74'; Dzsudzsák (yellow card) 90+9'	Report	Chorbadzhiyski 30'; Franchu (yellow card) 43'; Edomwonyi (yellow card) 51'; Chorbadzhiyski (yellow card) 60'; Lund (yellow card) 62'; Sentić (yellow card) 90+3'	Stadium: Nagyerdei Stadion; Attendance: 7,077; Referee: József Erdős; Assistant referees: Georgiou Theodoros, Gergő Vígh-Tarsonyi
Note: It was the 62nd "Eastern Derby" between the two teams. Debrecen won 39 matches, Diósgyőr won 12 and 11 ended in a draw. DVTK: Sentić — Szatmári (Acolatse (substituted on) 90'), Lund, Chorbadzhiyski, Saničanin — Holdampf (c), Klimovich, Franchu (Z. Varga (substituted on) 69') — D. Gera, Požeg Vancaš (Rharsalla (substituted on) 69'), Edomwonyi (Rakonjac (substituted on) 59') • Coach: Radenković

24 August 2024 5	Diósgyőr	1–0	Kecskemét	Miskolc
16:45 CEST	Klimovich (yellow card) 24'; Acolatse 74'; Lund (yellow card) 90+4'; D. Gera (yellow card) 90+6'	Report	A. Szabó (yellow card) 16'; Derekas (yellow card) 84'; B. Kovács (yellow card) 90+3'	Stadium: Diósgyőri Stadion; Attendance: 4,121; Referee: Balázs Berke; Assistant referees: Vencel Tóth II, Balázs Szert
Note: DVTK: Sentić — D. Gera (c), Szatmári, Chorbadzhiyski (Lund (substituted on) 46'), Saničanin — Klimovich (Požeg Vancaš (substituted on) 57'), Komlósi (Vallejo (substituted on) 68'), Franchu — Z. Varga (Acolatse (substituted on) 57'), Rakonjac, Rharsalla (Edomwonyi (substituted on) 68') • Coach: Radenković

31 August 2024 6	Diósgyőr	0–0	Győr	Miskolc
20:00 CEST	Saničanin (yellow card) 5'; Edomwonyi (yellow card) 58'; Acolatse (red card)	Report	R. Tóth (yellow card) 47'; Gavrić (yellow card) 87'; Petráš (red card)	Stadium: Diósgyőri Stadion; Attendance: 5,503; Referee: Gergő Bogár; Assistant referees: István Albert, Bence Belicza
Note: DVTK: Sentić — D. Gera (c), Szatmári, Lund, Saničanin — Rharsalla (Fekete (substituted on) 74'), Vallejo (Holdampf (substituted on) 74'), Franchu (Klimovich (substituted on) 61') — Z. Varga (Acolatse (substituted on) 46'), Edomwonyi, Požeg Vancaš (Jurek (substituted on) 61') • Coach: Radenković

21 September 2024 7	Újpest	0–0	Diósgyőr	Budapest
17:00 CEST	Lacoux (yellow card) 23' (yellow-red card) 78'; Duarte (yellow card) 78'; Nunes (yellow card) 90+2'	Report	Edomwonyi (yellow card) 24'; D. Gera (yellow card) 46'; Vallejo (yellow card) 59'; Chorbadzhiyski (yellow card) 75'; Rakonjac (yellow card) 90+8'	Stadium: Szusza Ferenc Stadion; Attendance: 8,562; Referee: Tamás Bognár; Assistant referees: Balázs Szert, Gergő Vígh-Tarsonyi
Note: DVTK: Sentić — Chorbadzhiyski, Szatmári, Lund (Bárdos (substituted on) 74'), Saničanin — Vallejo — Jurek (Franchu (substituted on) 62'), Holdampf (c) (Požeg Vancaš (substituted on) 84'), Klimovich, D. Gera — Edomwonyi (Rakonjac (substituted on) 74') • Coach: Radenković

28 September 2024 8	Diósgyőr	2–1	Zalaegerszeg	Miskolc
15:00 CEST	Rakonjac 10'; Szatmári 69'	Report	Mim 54'	Stadium: Diósgyőri Stadion; Attendance: 4,107; Referee: Péter Antal; Assistant referees: Vencel Tóth II, Zoltán Horváth
Note: DVTK: Sentić — Szatmári, Lund, Chorbadzhiyski, Saničanin — Vallejo (Požeg Vancaš (substituted on) 65') — Jurek (Acolatse (substituted on) 57'), Rakonjac (Kampetsis (substituted on) 84'), Holdampf (c), D. Gera (Rharsalla (substituted on) 57') — Franchu (Klimovich (substituted on) 57') • Coach: Radenković

5 October 2024 9	Nyíregyháza	0–2	Diósgyőr	Nyíregyháza
19:30 CEST	Navrátil (yellow card) 86'; D. Nagy (yellow card) 87'	Report	D. Gera (yellow card) 4' (goal) 46'; Edomwonyi 14'; Saničanin (yellow card) 45+4'; Klimovich (yellow card) 62'; Vallejo (yellow card) 82'; Rharsalla (yellow card) 90+1'; Bárdos (yellow card) 90+3'	Stadium: Városi Stadion; Attendance: 8,000; Referee: Gergő Bogár; Assistant referees: Gergely Becséri, Dávid Rózsa
Note: DVTK: Sentić — Szatmári (Bárdos (substituted on) 68'), Lund, Chorbadzhiyski, Saničanin — Vallejo — Klimovich (Komlósi (substituted on) 90'), Holdampf (c), Edomwonyi, D. Gera (Acolatse (substituted on) 77') — Rakonjac (Rharsalla (substituted on) 77') • Coach: Radenković; Player of the match: Siniša Saničanin, Diósgyőr 7.9 (Source:)

19 October 2024 10	Diósgyőr	0–2	MTK Budapest	Miskolc
17:30 CEST		Report	Kosznovszky 2' (yellow card) 84'; R. Molnár 42'; Jurina (yellow card) 73'	Stadium: Diósgyőri Stadion; Attendance: 5,405; Referee: Marcell Derdák; Assistant referees: Péter Kóbor, Balázs Szalai
Note: DVTK: Odyntsov — Szatmári (Klimovich (substituted on) 46'), Chorbadzhiyski, Bárdos, Saničanin (Adedokun (substituted on) 64') — Holdampf (c), Vallejo (Rharsalla (substituted on) 64') — D. Gera, Rakonjac (Acolatse (substituted on) 46'), Požeg Vancaš (Jurek (substituted on) 74') — Edomwonyi • Coach: Radenković; Player of the match: Patrik Demjén, MTK 9.2 • Best player of Diósgyőr: Chorbadzhiyski 7.9 (Source:)

26 October 2024 11	Puskás Akadémia	1–1	Diósgyőr	Felcsút
14:45 CEST	Colley 3' (yellow card) 57'; Stronati (yellow card) 80'	Report	Chorbadzhiyski (yellow card) 57'; Holdampf (yellow card) 57'; Bényei 68'	Stadium: Pancho Aréna; Attendance: 1,422; Referee: Péter Zierkelbach; Assistant referees: Norbert Bornemissza, István Szécsényi
Note: DVTK: Odyntsov — D. Gera (c) (Szatmári (substituted on) 89'), Chorbadzhiyski, Marco Lund, Saničanin — Komlósi (Holdampf (substituted on) 54') — Klimovich (Bényei (substituted on) 54'), Jurek (Acolatse (substituted on) 46'), Adedokun, Franchu (Rharsalla (substituted on) 46') — Edomwonyi • Coach: Radenković; Player of the match: Wojciech Golla, Puskás Akadémia 8.0 • Best player of Diósgyőr: Marco Lund 7.8 (Source:)

3 November 2024 12	Paks	3–4	Diósgyőr	Paks
12:30 CET	Böde (yellow card) 6' (goal) 22', 43'; Mezei (yellow card) 80'; B. Tóth 85'	Report	Acolatse 5'; Edomwonyi 30' (yellow card) 49'; Jurek 37'; Saničanin 73'; Rharsalla (yellow card) 90+2'	Stadium: Fehérvári úti Stadion; Attendance: 2,501; Referee: Balázs Berke; Assistant referees: Vencel Tóth II, Gergely Becséri
Note: DVTK: Odyntsov — Marco Lund, Chorbadzhiyski, Saničanin, Acolatse (Rharsalla (substituted on) 74') — Komlósi — D. Gera, Jurek (Kampetsis (substituted on) 74'), Holdampf (c), Bényei (Klimovich (substituted on) 65') — Edomwonyi (Szatmári (substituted on) 84') • Coach: Radenković; Player of the match: Dániel Böde, Paks 8.8 • Best player of Diósgyőr: Bright Edomwonyi 8.7 (Source:)

10 November 2024 13	Diósgyőr	1–0	Fehérvár	Miskolc
15:30 CET	Acolatse 4'; D. Gera (yellow card) 44'; Komlósi (yellow card) 58'; Holdampf (yellow card) 68'	Report	Serafimov (yellow card) 3'; Simut (yellow card) 70'; A. Huszti (yellow card) 77'; Csongvai (yellow card) 83'	Stadium: Diósgyőri Stadion; Attendance: 5,135; Referee: József Erdős; Assistant referees: Balázs Szalai, István Szécsényi
Note: DVTK: Odyntsov — D. Gera (Adedokun (substituted on) 65'), Szatmári, Bárdos, Saničanin — Holdampf (c), Komlósi (Huszár (substituted on) 65'), Bényei (Klimovich (substituted on) 69') — Acolatse, Rakonjac (Vallejo (substituted on) 85'), Požeg Vancaš (Franchu (substituted on) 69') • Coach: Radenković; Player of the match: Bence Bárdos, Diósgyőr and Nejc Gradišar, Fehérvár 7.4 each (Source:)

24 November 2024 14	Ferencváros	3–3	Diósgyőr	Budapest
15:30 CET	B. Varga 42' (yellow card) 71'; Botka (yellow card) 44'; Rommens 68'; Abu Fani 70' (yellow card) 85'	Report	Acolatse 7' (yellow card) 88'; Huszár 20'; Edomwonyi (yellow card) 23'; Bényei 41'; Holdampf (yellow card) 86'; Chorbadzhiyski (yellow card) 90+3'; Odyntsov (yellow card) 90+5'	Stadium: Ferencváros Stadion; Attendance: 8,723; Referee: Ferenc Karakó; Assistant referees: Buzás Balázs, Dávid Rózsa
Note: DVTK: Odyntsov — Chorbadzhiyski, Szatmári, Bárdos (Franchu (substituted on) 81'), Saničanin — Vallejo (Klimovich (substituted on) 72'), Bényei (Rakonjac (substituted on) 81'), Holdampf (c) — Acolatse, Edomwonyi (Lund (substituted on) 72'), Huszár (Kampetsis (substituted on) 64') • Coach: Radenković; Player of the match: Mohammad Abu Fani, Ferencváros 9.5 • Best player of Diósgyőr: Elton Acolatse 7.4 (Source:)

30 November 2024 15	Diósgyőr	3–1	Debrecen	Miskolc
16:30 CET	Klimovich 25'; D. Gera 44' (yellow card) 67'; Acolatse (yellow card) 70'; Rakonjac 84' (yellow card) 84'	Report	Drešković (yellow card) 18'; Domingues 62'; Lagator (yellow card) 69'; Szuhodovszki (yellow card) 73'	Stadium: Diósgyőri Stadion; Attendance: 5,518; Referee: Csaba Pintér; Assistant referees: Péter Kóbor, József Aradi
Note: DVTK: Odyntsov — Szatmári, Lund, Bárdos, Klimovich (Komlósi (substituted on) 79') — Acolatse (Sáreczki (substituted on) 86'), Vallejo — D. Gera (c), Edomwonyi (Rakonjac (substituted on) 79'), Huszár (Jurek (substituted on) 60') — Z. Varga (Franchu (substituted on) 60') • Coach: Radenković; Player of the match: Vladislav Klimovich, Elton Acolatse Diósgyőr and Balázs Dzsudzsák, Debrecen 7.9 each (Source:)

7 December 2024 16	Kecskemét	0–0	Diósgyőr	Kecskemét
13:30 CET	Belényesi (yellow card) 17'; A. Szabó (yellow card) 46'; Vágó (yellow card) 63'	Report	Bárdos (yellow card) 36'	Stadium: Széktói Stadion; Attendance: 2,415; Referee: József Erdős; Assistant referees: István Szécsényi, Dániel Szalai
Note: DVTK: Odyntsov — D. Gera (c), Szatmári, Lund, Bárdos — Vallejo — Acolatse (Požeg Vancaš (substituted on) 82'), Klimovich (Jurek (substituted on) 71'), Á. Bényei, Huszár (Franchu (substituted on) 59') — Edomwonyi (Rakonjac (substituted on) 71') • Coach: Radenković; Player of the match: Alex Szabó, Kecskemét 7.4 • Best player of Diósgyőr: Marco Lund 7.3 (Source:)

14 December 2024 17	Győr	3–4	Diósgyőr	Győr
17:00 CET	Sahli 59'; D. Gera 79' (o.g.); Štefulj 83'	Report	Bárdos 24', 44'; Edomwonyi 32'; Klimovich 51'; Chorbadzhiyski (yellow card) 86'; Franchu (yellow card) 90'; Á. Bényei (yellow card) 90+5'	Stadium: ETO Park; Attendance: 2,148; Referee: István Vad; Assistant referees: Balázs Huszár, Péter Ország
Note: DVTK: Odyntsov — D. Gera, Szatmári, Lund, Bárdos — Á. Bényei, Holdampf (c), Klimovich (Franchu (substituted on) 85') — Jurek (Huszár (substituted on) 74'), Edomwonyi, Acolatse (Chorbadzhiyski (substituted on) 82') • Coach: Radenković; Player of the match: Gábor Jurek, Diósgyőr 8.6 (Source:)

1 February 2025 18	Diósgyőr	1–1	Újpest	Miskolc
19:30 CET	Szatmári 56'; D. Gera (yellow card) 72'	Report	Karamoko 21'; Duarte (yellow card) 55'; Kaczvinszki (red card) 66'; Piscitelli (yellow card) 90+3'	Stadium: Diósgyőri Stadion; Attendance: 6,642; Referee: Mihály Káprály; Assistant referees: Balázs Szert, József Aradi
Note: DVTK: Danilović — Szatmári (Rakonjac (substituted on) 67'), Lund, Bárdos, Saničanin — Vallejo (Á. Bényei (substituted on) 90+1'), Klimovich (Tiéhi (substituted on) 46') — Acolatse, D. Gera (c), Jurek (Požeg Vancaš (substituted on) 78') — Edomwonyi • Manager: Radenković; Player of the match: Mamoudou Karamoko, Újpest 7.7 • Best player of Diósgyőr: Elton Acolatse 7.6 (Source:)

9 February 2025 19	Zalaegerszeg	2–1	Diósgyőr	Zalaegerszeg
15:30 CET	Esiti (yellow card) 11'; Csonka (yellow card) 40'; Szendrei (yellow card) 70'; Nyíri 72'; Várkonyi (yellow card) 81'; D. Németh 90+6'	Report	Bárdos 8'; Jurek (yellow card) 52'; Acolatse (yellow card) 67'; Rakonjac (yellow card) 82'	Stadium: ZTE Arena; Attendance: 2,177; Referee: Imre Kovács; Assistant referees: István Szécsényi, Zoltán Horváth
Note: DVTK: Simon — Saničanin, Bárdos, Á. Bényei (Požeg Vancaš (substituted on) 71'), D. Gera (c) — Jurek (Huszár (substituted on) 61'), Chorbadzhiyski, Vallejo, Acolatse (Kállai (substituted on) 90+2') — Edomwonyi (Rakonjac (substituted on) 61'), Tiéhi (Holdampf (substituted on) 61') • Manager: Radenković; Player of the match: Vince Nyíri, Zalaegerszeg 8.1 • Best player of Diósgyőr: Bence Bárdos, Bozhidar Chorbadzhiyski 7.3 each (Source:)

15 February 2025 20	Diósgyőr	1–2	Nyíregyháza	Miskolc
17:00 CET	Komlósi (yellow card) 9'; Rakonjac 60' (pen.); Holdampf (yellow card) 76'	Report	B. Nagy (yellow card) 8'; M. Kovács (yellow card) 20'; Beke 39'; D. Nagy (yellow card) 43'; Keresztes (yellow card) 72'; Babić 90+1'	Stadium: Diósgyőri Stadion; Attendance: 7,552; Referee: Bence Csonka; Assistant referees: István Albert, Balázs Szert
Note: DVTK: Simon — D. Gera (c), Lund, Bárdos, Saničanin — Komlósi (Á. Bényei (substituted on) 46'), Rakonjac, Tiéhi (Holdampf (substituted on) 46') — Acolatse (Požeg Vancaš (substituted on) 61'), Edomwonyi (Klimovich (substituted on) 46'), Jurek (Skribek (substituted on) 83') • Manager: Radenković; Player of the match: Yuriy Toma, Nyíregyháza 7.9 • Best player of Diósgyőr: Siniša Saničanin 7.7 (Source:)

21 February 2025 21	MTK Budapest	4–0	Diósgyőr	Budapest
20:00 CET	P. Kovács I 26'; Jurina 41'; Kádár 58'; Varju 78'	Report	D. Gera (yellow card) 50'	Stadium: Hidegkuti Nándor Stadion; Attendance: 2,761; Referee: Marcell Derdák; Assistant referees: Gergő Vígh-Tarsonyi, Péter Ország
Note: DVTK: Odyntsov — D. Gera, Lund, Bárdos, Saničanin — Holdampf (c) (Klimovich (substituted on) 61'), Tiéhi (Szakos (substituted on) 85') — Jurek (Huszár (substituted on) 74'), Á. Bényei, Požeg Vancaš (Vallejo (substituted on) 61') — Edomwonyi (Acolatse (substituted on) 46') • Caretaker manager: Vincze; Player of the match: Benedek Varju, MTK 8.7 • Best player of Diósgyőr: Rudi Požeg Vancaš 7.0 (Source:)

1 March 2025 22	Diósgyőr	2–1	Puskás Akadémia	Miskolc
17:00 CET	Požeg Vancaš 6'; Jurek (yellow card) 86' (goal) 89'	Report	Favorov 28'	Stadium: Diósgyőri Stadion; Attendance: 3,645; Referee: Balázs Berke; Assistant referees: Vencel Tóth II, Norbert Bornemissza
Note: DVTK: Simon — D. Gera, Chorbadzhiyski, Bárdos, Saničanin — Holdampf (c) (Á. Bényei (substituted on) 90+2'), Vallejo, Tiéhi (Klimovich (substituted on) 78') — Acolatse, Edomwonyi (Rakonjac (substituted on) 68'), Požeg Vancaš (Jurek (substituted on) 68') • Manager: Dambrauskas; Player of the match: Artem Favorov, Puskás Akadémia 8.0 • Best player of Diósgyőr: Elton Acolatse 7.7 (Source:)

8 March 2025 23	Diósgyőr	0–2	Paks	Miskolc
19:30 CET		Report	Chorbadzhiyski 23' (o.g.); Osváth 48'; Lenzsér (yellow card) 68'	Stadium: Diósgyőri Stadion; Attendance: 4,703; Referee: József Erdős; Assistant referees: Gergely Becséri, Dávid Rózsa
Note: DVTK: Odyntsov — D. Gera, Chorbadzhiyski, Bárdos, Saničanin (Kállai (substituted on) 88') – Tiéhi (Klimovich (substituted on) 46'), Acolatse (Požeg Vancaš (substituted on) 79'), Vallejo – Holdampf (c) (Rakonjac (substituted on) 62'), Jurek, Edomwonyi (Á. Bényei (substituted on) 79') • Manager: Dambrauskas; Player of the match: János Szabó, Paks 8.4 • Best player of Diósgyőr: Álex Vallejo 7.7 (Source:)

16 March 2025 24	Fehérvár	0–0	Diósgyőr	Székesfehérvár
12:30 CET	Serafimov (yellow card) 33'; Melnyk (yellow card) 56'; Spandler (yellow card) 86'; Šaponjić (yellow card) 89'	Report	Chorbadzhiyski (yellow card) 20'; Lund (yellow card) 40'; Bényei (yellow card) 79' (yellow-red card) 90+2'	Stadium: Sóstói Stadion; Attendance: 2,794; Referee: Ferenc Karakó; Assistant referees: István Albert, Norbert Bornemissza
Note: DVTK: Odyntsov — D. Gera, Lund, Chorbadzhiyski, Saničanin — Holdampf (c), Tiéhi (Požeg Vancaš (substituted on) 66'), Vallejo — Acolatse (Skribek (substituted on) 66'), Rakonjac (Edomwonyi (substituted on) 77'), Jurek (Á. Bényei (substituted on) 77') • Manager: Dambrauskas; Player of the match: Siniša Saničanin, Diósgyőr 7.5 (Source:)

30 March 2025 25	Diósgyőr	1–1	Ferencváros	Miskolc
17:00 CEST	Bárdos (yellow card) 17'; Vallejo (yellow card) 31'; Požeg Vancaš 41'	Report	Ćivić (yellow card) 15' (yellow-red card) 24'; B. Varga 32' (pen.); Traoré (yellow card) 42'; Makreckis (yellow card) 61'	Stadium: Diósgyőri Stadion; Attendance: 10,344; Referee: Gergő Bogár; Assistant referees: Georgiou Theodoros, Péter Garai
Note: DVTK: Odyntsov — Szakos (D. Gera (substituted on) 79'), Lund, Bárdos, Saničanin — Vallejo, Holdampf (c) (Tiéhi (substituted on) 79') — Acolatse (Jurek (substituted on) 79'), Skribek, Požeg Vancaš (Benkő (substituted on) 88') — Rakonjac (Edomwonyi (substituted on) 71') • Manager: Dambrauskas; Player of the match: Barnabás Varga, Ferencváros 8.0 • Best player of Diósgyőr: Rudi Požeg Vancaš 7.6 (Source:)

5 April 2025 26	Debrecen	4–1	Diósgyőr	Debrecen
19:30 CEST	Bárány 25', 52', 69' (pen.); Domingues 55' (yellow card) 70'	Report	Edomwonyi 17'; Holdampf (yellow card) 57'; Ke. Kállai (yellow card) 80'	Stadium: Nagyerdei Stadion; Attendance: 5,244; Referee: Tamás Bognár; Assistant referees: Péter Kóbor, István Szécsényi
Note: Player of the match: Donát Bárány, Debrecen 9.8 • Best player of Diósgyőr: Álex Vallejo, Odyntsov 7.2 each (Source:)

11 April 2025 27	Diósgyőr	2–1	Kecskemét	Miskolc
18:00 CEST	Lund (yellow card) 36'; D. Gera (yellow card) 44'; Tiéhi (yellow card) 60'; Acolatse 87'; Edomwonyi 89'	Report	Camaj 30' (pen.); Botka (yellow card) 71'; Bocskay (yellow card) 83'	Stadium: Diósgyőri Stadion; Attendance: 4,617; Referee: Marcell Derdák; Assistant referees: Vencel Tóth II, Balázs Huszár
Note: DVTK: Simon — D. Gera (c), Lund, Bárdos, Saničanin — Tiéhi (Klimovich (substituted on) 85'), Vallejo, Skribek (Rakonjac (substituted on) 66') — Acolatse, Edomwonyi (Chorbadzhiyski (substituted on) 90+2'), Požeg Vancaš (Á. Bényei (substituted on) 90+2') • Manager: Dambrauskas

19 April 2025 28	Diósgyőr	2–4	Győr	Miskolc
16:15 CEST	D. Gera 30'; Edomwonyi 67'	Report	Bánáti 8'; Bumba 19'; Vitális 40'; Ouro 86'	Stadium: Diósgyőri Stadion; Attendance: 6,198; Referee: Csaba Pintér; Assistant referees: Gergő Vígh-Tarsonyi, Dávid Rózsa
Note: DVTK: Simon — D. Gera (Kállai (substituted on) 90'), Chorbadzhiyski, Bárdos, Saničanin (Szakos (substituted on) 65') — Vallejo — Acolatse, Tiéhi (Rakonjac (substituted on) 78'), Holdampf (c) (Klimovich (substituted on) 65'), Požeg Vancaš (Benkő (substituted on) 90') — Edomwonyi • Manager: Dambrauskas; Player of the match: Claudiu Bumba, Győr 9.3 • Best player of Diósgyőr: Barnabás Simon 8.2 (Source:)

26 April 2025 29	Újpest	1–1	Diósgyőr	Budapest
20:00 CEST	Lacoux 48'; Fiola (yellow card) 85'; Brodić (yellow card) 90+4'	Report	Holdampf (yellow card) 44'; Kállai (yellow card) 53'; Szakos 69'	Stadium: Szusza Ferenc Stadion; Attendance: 5,187; Referee: Marcell Derdák; Assistant referees: Balázs Buzás, Bence Belicza

4 May 2025 30	Diósgyőr	1–1	Zalaegerszeg	Miskolc
13:30 CEST	Rakonjac 59'; Holdampf (yellow card) 74'	Report	Esiti (yellow card) 72'; Ipalibo 80'; Krajcsovics (yellow card) 90'	Stadium: Diósgyőri Stadion; Attendance: 4,632; Referee: József Erdős; Assistant referees: Vencel Tóth II, Dániel Szalai
Note: DVTK: Odyntsov — Szakos (Saničanin (substituted on) 83'), Chorbadzhiyski, Lund, D. Gera — Vallejo, Holdampf (c) — Acolatse (Benkő (substituted on) 76'), Skribek (Rakonjac (substituted on) 46'), Požeg Vancaš — Edomwonyi (Klimovich (substituted on) 83') • Manager: Dambrauskas; Player of the match: Álex Vallejo, Diósgyőr 7.5 (Source:)

11 May 2025 31	Nyíregyháza	1–0	Diósgyőr	Nyíregyháza
15:30 CEST	Beke (yellow card) 52'; M. Kovács (yellow card) 69'; Eppel 70'; D. Nagy (yellow card) 76'	Report	D. Gera (yellow card) 29'; Holdampf (yellow card) 69'; Acolatse (yellow card) 72'; Chorbadzhiyski (yellow card) 76'; Edomwonyi (yellow card) 90+2'	Stadium: Városi Stadion; Attendance: 8,053; Referee: Balázs Berke (referee); Assistant referees: Gergely Becséri, Dávid Rózsa
Note: DVTK: Sentić — Szakos, Lund, Chorbadzhiyski, Saničanin — D. Gera (Klimovich (substituted on) 73'), Vallejo, Holdampf (c) (Kállai (substituted on) 82') — Rakonjac (Edomwonyi (substituted on) 73'), Acolatse, Požeg Vancaš (Jurek (substituted on) 73') • Manager: Dambrauskas; Player of the match: Márton Eppel, Nyíregyháza 7.6 • Best player of Diósgyőr: Siniša Saničanin 7.3 (Source:)

17 May 2025 32	Diósgyőr	2–1	MTK Budapest	Miskolc
20:00 CEST	Rakonjac 49' (yellow card) 90+2'; Kállai 66'; Saničanin (yellow card) 83'; Demeter (yellow card) 88'	Report	Horváth (yellow card) 2'; Gruber 17' (yellow card) 54'	Stadium: Diósgyőri Stadion; Attendance: 4,403; Referee: Ferenc Karakó; Assistant referees: Dániel Szalai, József Aradi
Note: DVTK: Sentić — Kállai (Tiéhi (substituted on) 81'), Lund (Chorbadzhiyski (substituted on) 42'), Saničanin — Szakos (Á. Bényei (substituted on) 81'), Vallejo, Holdampf (c), Demeter — Jurek (Požeg Vancaš (substituted on) 81'), Edomwonyi (Rakonjac (substituted on) 46'), Acolatse • Manager: Dambrauskas; Player of the match: Álex Vallejo, Diósgyőr: 8.1 (Source:)

24 May 2025 33	Puskás Akadémia	4–3	Diósgyőr	Felcsút
20:00 CEST	Levi 22', 72'; Duarte (yellow card) 36'; Plšek 89', 90+3'	Report	Rakonjac (yellow card) 19'; Demeter (yellow card) 15' (yellow-red card) 27'; Acolatse 42'; D. Gera 51'; Skribek 81'; Sentić (yellow card) 90+2'	Stadium: Pancho Aréna; Attendance: 2,385; Referee: Csaba Pintér; Assistant referees: Balázs Huszár, Dániel Szalai
Note: DVTK: Sentić — Szakos (Skribek (substituted on) 79'), Holdampf (c), Vallejo, D. Gera – Klimovich (Kovalenko (substituted on) 90+1'), Á. Bényei, Demeter – Jurek (Sáreczki (substituted on) 79'), Rakonjac (Kállai (substituted on) 90+1'), Acolatse (Požeg Vancaš (substituted on) 64') • Manager: Dambrauskas; Player of the match: Jonathan Levi, Puskás Akadémia 10.0 • Best player of Diósgyőr: Alen Skribek 7.4 (Source:)

==== Results overview ====
All results are indicated from the perspective of Diósgyőri VTK.
We indicate in parentheses the number of round.
Win Draw Loss Postponed

Opposition	Round 1–22		Round 23–33		Double	Points
Opposition	Home score	Away score	Home score	Away score	Double	Points
Debrecen	3–1 (15)	1–0 (4)		1–4 (26)	5–5	6
Fehérvár	1–0 (13)	1–3 (2)		0–0 (24)	2–3	4
Ferencváros	0–2 (3)	3–3 (14)	1–1 (25)		4–6	2
Győr	0–0 (6)	4–3 (17)	2–4 (28)		6–7	4
Kecskemét	1–0 (5)	0–0 (16)	2–1 (27)		3–1	7
MTK	0–2 (10)	0–4 (21)	2–1 (32)		2–7	3
Nyíregyháza	1–2 (20)	2–0 (9)		0–1 (31)	3–3	3
Paks	2–2 (1)	4–3 (12)	0–2 (23)		6–7	4
Puskás Akadémia	2–1 (22)	1–1 (11)		3–4 (33)	6–6	4
Újpest	1–1 (18)	0–0 (7)		1–1 (29)	2–2	3
Zalaegerszeg	2–1 (8)	1–2 (19)	1–1 (30)		4–4	4

=== Magyar Kupa ===
==== Round of 64 ====
The draw for the Round of 64 was held on 26 August 2024. Kazincbarcika also started the Magyar Kupa competitions in this round.

16 September 2024 R64	Kazincbarcika (NB II)	2–4 (a.e.t.)	Diósgyőr	Kazincbarcika
19:00 CEST	J. Varga (yellow card) 27'; M. Szabó 39', 55'; Debreceni (yellow card) 78'	Report	Holdampf (yellow card) 14'; Jurek 31'; Szatmári (yellow card) 38'; Z. Varga 71'; Rakonjac 95', 109'; D. Gera (yellow card) 103'	Stadium: Kolorcity Aréna; Attendance: 1,120; Referee: Ferenc Karakó; Assistant referees: Balázs Szert, Dávid Rózsa
Note: DVTK: Sentić — D. Gera, Szatmári, Lund, Saničanin (Bárdos (substituted on) 117') — Vallejo, Holdampf (c) (Kampetsis (substituted on) 76'), Požeg Vancaš (Klimovich (substituted on) 60') — Edomwonyi (Rakonjac (substituted on) 46'), Jurek (Z. Varga (substituted on) 60'), Acolatse (Rharsalla (substituted on) 60') • Coach: Radenković

==== Round of 32 ====
The draw for the Round of 64 was held on 16 September 2024. In the draw Diósgyőr got Fehérvár as their opponent, who play also in NB I. Fehérvár also started the Magyar Kupa competitions in Round of 64, they matched Monor (NB III) away and the result was 2–0.

30 October 2024 R32	Fehérvár (NB I)	2–1	Diósgyőr	Székesfehérvár
20:00 CET	Spandler (yellow card) 43'; Simut 68'; Gradišar 90+5'; Miličević (yellow card) 90+8'	Report	D. Gera (yellow card) 43'; Saničanin 45+3'	Stadium: Sóstói Stadion; Attendance: 2,338; Referee: Csaba Pintér; Assistant referees: Péter Kóbor, Georgiou Theodoros
Note: DVTK: Odyntsov — D. Gera, Szatmári, Bárdos, Saničanin — Holdampf (c) — Acolatse (Kampetsis (substituted on) 83'), Á. Bényei, Franchu (Klimovich (substituted on) 70'), Z. Varga (Požeg Vancaš (substituted on) 61') — Rakonjac (Edomwonyi (substituted on) 70') • Coach: Radenković

== Squad statistics ==
As of match played 30 March 2025

Keys
Rk.	Rank	No.	Squad number	Pos.	Position
Opponent	The opponent team without a flag is Hungarian.			(N)	The game was played at a neutral site.
(H)	Diósgyőri VTK were the home team.			(A)	Diósgyőri VTK were the away team.
Player	Young Hungarian Player, who is a Hungarian player and was born 2004 or after				
Player^{*}	Player who joined Diósgyőri VTK permanently or on loan during the season				
Player^{†}	Player who departed Diósgyőri VTK permanently or on loan during the season				

=== Appearances ===
Includes all competitions for senior teams.
We indicate the number of the player's appearances as substitute by the combination of a plus sign and a figure.
We indicate with gold color the maximum appearances only in the competition in which the team has already played at least 2 matches.

No.	Pos.	Nat.	Player	Nemzeti Bajnokság I	Magyar Kupa	Season total	Ref.
Goalkeepers
1	GK	(Hungary)	Bogdán Bánhegyi	0	0	0	
12	GK	(Ukraine)	Artem Odyntsov	14	1	15	
30	GK	(Croatia)	Karlo Sentić	7	1	8	
44	GK	(Serbia)	Branislav Danilović	1	0	1	
51	GK	(Hungary)	Barnabás Simon^{*}	3	0	3	
76	GK	(Hungary)	Barnabás Németh	0	0	0	
Defenders
3	DF	(Hungary)	Csaba Szatmári	15+2	2	17+2	
4	DF	(Denmark)	Marco Lund	18+2	1	19+2	
5	DF	(Bulgaria)	Bozhidar Chorbadzhiyski	14+1	0	14+1	
6	DF	(Hungary)	Bence Bárdos	13+2	1+1	14+3	
11	DF	(Hungary)	Dániel Gera	23+1	2	25+1	
15	DF	(Bosnia and Herzegovina)	Siniša Saničanin	22	2	24	
26	DF	(Serbia)	Uroš Drezgić^{*}	0	0	0	
72	DF	(Hungary)	Kevin Kállai	0+2	0	0+2	
85	DF	(Hungary)	Bence Szakos	1+1	0	1+1	
Midfielders
16	MF	(Hungary)	Bence Komlósi	5+2	0	5+2	
20	MF	(Hungary)	Ágoston Bényei	8+8	1	9+8	
21	MF	(Belarus)	Vladislav Klimovich	11+11	0+2	11+13	
22	MF	(Ivory Coast)	Christ Tiéhi	6+2	0	6+2	
25	MF	(Hungary)	Gergő Holdampf (c)	16+5	2	18+5	
50	MF	(Spain)	Álex Vallejo	15+4	1	16+4	
66	MF	(Hungary)	Bálint Ferencsik	0+2	0	0+2	
68	MF	(Hungary)	Zétény Varga^{*}	6+1	1+1	7+2	
Forwards
7	FW	(Montenegro)	Marko Rakonjac^{*}	11+9	1+1	12+10	
10	FW	(Hungary)	Gábor Jurek	11+7	1	12+7	
17	FW	(Netherlands)	Elton Acolatse	13+8	2	15+8	
34	FW	(Nigeria)	Bright Edomwonyi	18+5	1+1	19+6	
67	FW	(Hungary)	Szabolcs Sáreczki	0+1	0	0+1	
70	FW	(Hungary)	Alen Skribek^{*}	1+2	0	1+2	
79	FW	(Hungary)	Péter Benkő	0+1	0	0+1	
94	FW	(Slovenia)	Rudi Požeg Vancaš	8+10	1+1	9+11	
96	FW	(Hungary)	Marcell Huszár^{*}	4+4	0	4+4	
Players who departed the club on loan but featured this season
Players who left the club during the season
(9)	FW	(Greece)	Argyris Kampetsis^{†}	0+4	0+2	0+6	
(19)	MF	(Hungary)	Máté Herbák^{†}	0	0	0	
(29)	FW	(Argentina)	Franchu^{†}	7+7	1	8+7	
(33)	DF	(Republic of Ireland)	Val Adedokun^{*†}	1+2	0	1+2	
(59)	MF	(Romania)	Doru Popadiuc^{†}	0	0	0	
(75)	FW	(Morocco)	Moha Rharsalla^{†}	3+7	0+1	3+8	
(87)	FW	(Hungary)	Vince Fekete^{†}	0+2	0	0+2	
(99)	FW	(Montenegro)	Nikola Gluščević^{†}	0	0	0	

Notes: GK: goalkeeper; DF: defender; MF: midfielder; FW: forward

=== Goal scorers ===
Includes all competitions for senior teams. The list is sorted by squad number when season-total goals are equal. Players with no goals not included in the list.
We indicate in parentheses how many of the goals scored by the player from penalties.

Rk.	No.	Pos.	Nat.	Player	Nemzeti Bajnokság I	Magyar Kupa	Season total
1	7	FW	(Montenegro)	Marko Rakonjac^{*}	4 (1)	2	6
2	17	FW	(Netherlands)	Elton Acolatse	4	0	4
2	34	FW	(Nigeria)	Bright Edomwonyi	4	0	4
3	6	DF	(Hungary)	Bence Bárdos	3	0	3
3	10	FW	(Hungary)	Gábor Jurek	2	1	3
4	3	DF	(Hungary)	Csaba Szatmári	2	0	2
4	11	DF	(Hungary)	Dániel Gera	2	0	2
4	15	DF	(Bosnia and Herzegovina)	Siniša Saničanin	1	1	2
4	20	MF	(Hungary)	Ágoston Bényei	2	0	2
4	21	MF	(Belarus)	Vladislav Klimovich	2	0	2
4	94	FW	(Slovenia)	Rudi Požeg Vancaš	2	0	2
5	5	DF	(Bulgaria)	Bozhidar Chorbadzhiyski	1	0	1
5	(29)	FW	(Argentina)	Franchu^{†}	1	0	1
5	68	MF	(Hungary)	Zétény Varga^{*}	0	1	1
5	96	FW	(Hungary)	Marcell Huszár^{*}	1	0	1
				Opponent Own goal	0	0	0
Total					31	5	36

=== Penalties ===
Date	Penalty Taker	Scored	Opponent	Competition
15 February 2025	(Montenegro) Marko Rakonjac	Yes	Nyíregyháza (H)	Nemzeti Bajnokság I, Round 20

=== Own goals ===
Key
Score	The score is at the time of the own goal.		
(H)	Diósgyőri VTK were the home team.	(A)	Diósgyőri VTK were the away team.

Pos.	Nat.	Player	Minute	Score	Result	Opponent	Competition	Date
DF	(Hungary)	Dániel Gera	79	4–2	4–3	Győr (Hungary) (A)	Nemzeti Bajnokság I, Round 17	14 December 2024
DF	(Bulgaria)	Bozhidar Chorbadzhiyski	23	0–1	0–2	Paks (Hungary) (H)	Nemzeti Bajnokság I, Round 23	8 March 2025

=== Assists ===
Includes all competitions for senior teams. The list is sorted by squad number when season-total assists are equal. Players with no assists not included in the list.

Rk.	No.	Pos.	Nat.	Player	Nemzeti Bajnokság I	Magyar Kupa	Season total
1	10	FW	(Hungary)	Gábor Jurek	6	0	6
2	17	FW	(Netherlands)	Elton Acolatse	4	0	4
2	34	FW	(Nigeria)	Bright Edomwonyi	4	0	4
3	94	FW	(Slovenia)	Rudi Požeg Vancaš	3	0	3
4	15	DF	(Bosnia and Herzegovina)	Siniša Saničanin	1	1	2
4	21	MF	(Belarus)	Vladislav Klimovich	1	1	2
5	11	DF	(Hungary)	Dániel Gera	1	0	1
5	(29)	FW	(Argentina)	Franchu^{†}	1	0	1
5	68	MF	(Hungary)	Zétény Varga^{*}	0	1	1
5	(75)	FW	(Morocco)	Moha Rharsalla^{†}	0	1	1
Total					20	4	24

=== Goalkeepers ===
==== Clean sheets ====
Includes all competitions for senior teams. The list is sorted by squad number when season-total clean sheets are equal. Numbers in parentheses represent games where both goalkeepers participated and both kept a clean sheet; the number in parentheses is awarded to the goalkeeper who was substituted on, whilst a full clean sheet is awarded to the goalkeeper who was on the field at the start of play.
We indicate in parentheses how many of the goals scored from penalties.

Games and Goals							Clean sheets		
Rk.	No.	Nat.	Goalkeeper	Games Played	Goals Against	Goals Against Average	Nemzeti Bajnokság I	Magyar Kupa	Season total
1	30	(Croatia)	Karlo Sentić	8	5 (1)	0.63	5	0	5
2	12	(Ukraine)	Artem Odyntsov	15	27 (1)	1.80	3	0	3
3	44	(Serbia)	Branislav Danilović	1	1	1.00	0	0	0
3	51	(Hungary)	Barnabás Simon^{*}	3	5	1.67	0	0	0
Total					38 (2)		8	0	8

==== Penalties saving ====
Date	Goalkeeper	Penalty Kick Save	Penalty Taker	Opponent	Competition	Min	Rem
28 July 2024	(Ukraine) Artem Odyntsov	No	(Hungary) József Windecker	Paks (H)	Nemzeti Bajnokság I, Round 1	(penalty scored) '81	
10 August 2024	(Croatia) Karlo Sentić	No	(Tunisia) Mohamed Ali Ben Romdhane	Ferencváros (H)	Nemzeti Bajnokság I, Round 3	(penalty scored) '21	
30 October 2024	(Ukraine) Artem Odyntsov	Yes	(Slovenia) Nejc Gradišar	Fehérvár (A)	Magyar Kupa, Round of 32	(penalty missed) '90+5	
14 December 2024	(Ukraine) Artem Odyntsov	Yes	(Romania) Claudiu Bumba	Győr (A)	Nemzeti Bajnokság I, Round 17	(penalty missed) '71	post (Note: The player taking the penalty (Claudiu Bumba) hit the goalpost and then the goal of the player who kicked the rebound into the goal (Paul Anton) was disallowed after a VAR review, as he was inside the penalty area at the time of the kick.)

=== Disciplinary record ===
Includes all competitions for senior teams. The list is sorted by red cards, then yellow cards (and by squad number when total cards are equal). Players with no cards not included in the list.

Rk.	No.	Pos.	Nat.	Player	Nemzeti Bajnokság I				Magyar Kupa				Season total			
Rk.	No.	Pos.	Nat.	Player	Yellow card	Second yellow card	Red card	MM	Yellow card	Second yellow card	Red card	MM	Yellow card	Second yellow card	Red card	MM
1	17	FW	(Netherlands)	Elton Acolatse	3	0	1	1	0	0	0	0	3	0	1	1
2	20	MF	(Hungary)	Ágoston Bényei	2	1	0	1	0	0	0	0	2	1	0	1
3	11	DF	(Hungary)	Dániel Gera	8	0	0	1	2	0	0	0	10	0	0	1
4	34	FW	(Nigeria)	Bright Edomwonyi	7	0	0	1	0	0	0	0	7	0	0	1
5	5	DF	(Bulgaria)	Bozhidar Chorbadzhiyski	6	0	0	1	0	0	0	0	6	0	0	1
6	25	MF	(Hungary)	Gergő Holdampf (c)	4	0	0	0	1	0	0	0	5	0	0	0
7	4	DF	(Denmark)	Marco Lund	4	0	0	0	0	0	0	0	4	0	0	0
7	15	DF	(Bosnia and Herzegovina)	Siniša Saničanin	4	0	0	0	0	0	0	0	4	0	0	0
8	6	DF	(Hungary)	Bence Bárdos^{*}	3	0	0	0	0	0	0	0	3	0	0	0
8	7	FW	(Montenegro)	Marko Rakonjac^{*}	3	0	0	0	0	0	0	0	3	0	0	0
8	50	MF	(Spain)	Álex Vallejo^{*}	3	0	0	0	0	0	0	0	3	0	0	0
9	3	DF	(Hungary)	Csaba Szatmári	1	0	0	0	1	0	0	0	2	0	0	0
9	10	MF	(Hungary)	Gábor Jurek	2	0	0	0	0	0	0	0	2	0	0	0
9	16	DF	(Hungary)	Bence Komlósi	2	0	0	0	0	0	0	0	2	0	0	0
9	21	MF	(Belarus)	Vladislav Klimovich	2	0	0	0	0	0	0	0	2	0	0	0
9	(29)	FW	(Argentina)	Franchu^{†}	2	0	0	0	0	0	0	0	2	0	0	0
9	(75)	FW	(Morocco)	Moha Rharsalla^{†}	2	0	0	0	0	0	0	0	2	0	0	0
10	12	GK	(Ukraine)	Artem Odyntsov	1	0	0	0	0	0	0	0	1	0	0	0
10	30	GK	(Croatia)	Karlo Sentić	1	0	0	0	0	0	0	0	1	0	0	0
10	68	MF	(Hungary)	Zétény Varga^{*}	1	0	0	0	0	0	0	0	1	0	0	0
Total					60	1	1	5	4	0	0	0	64	1	1	5

=== Suspensions ===
Player	Date Received	Offence	Competition	Length of suspension			
(Netherlands) Elton Acolatse	31 August 2024	(red card) 90+6' vs Győr (H)	NB I, Round 6	1 Match (Originally 2 Matches)	Újpest (A)–~~Zalaegerszeg (H)~~	NB I, Round 7–~~8~~	21–~~28~~ September 2024
(Nigeria) Bright Edomwonyi	21 September 2024	5th (yellow card) after Újpest (A)	NB I, Round 7	1 Match	Zalaegerszeg (H)	NB I, Round 8	28 September 2024
(Hungary) Dániel Gera	10 November 2024	5th (yellow card) after Fehérvár (H)	NB I, Round 13	1 Match	Ferencváros (A)	NB I, Round 14	24 November 2024
(Bulgaria) Bozhidar Chorbadzhiyski	14 December 2024	5th (yellow card) after Győr (A)	NB I, Round 17	1 Match	Újpest (H)	NB I, Round 18	1 February 2025
(Hungary) Ágoston Bényei	16 March 2025	(yellow card) 79' (yellow-red card) 90+2' vs Fehérvár (A)	NB I, Round 24	1 Match	Ferencváros (H)	NB I, Round 25	30 March 2025

=== Injuries ===
Player	Date	Offence	Competition	Ref.
(Romania) Doru Popadiuc	Pre-season			
(Hungary) Gábor Jurek	Pre-season			
(Netherlands) Elton Acolatse	Pre-season			
(Slovenia) Rudi Požeg Vancaš	1 August 2024	In training		
(Serbia) Uroš Drezgić	7 August 2024	Tiszaújváros	NB III, Round 2 (DVTK II F4R) (substituted off) 81'	
(Hungary) Ágoston Bényei	10 August 2024	Ferencváros (H)	Nemzeti Bajnokság I, Round 3 (substituted off) 81'	
(Hungary) Bence Komlósi	24 August 2024	Kecskemét (H)	Nemzeti Bajnokság I, Round 5 (substituted off) 68'	
(Hungary) Csaba Szatmári	1 February 2025	Újpest (H)	Nemzeti Bajnokság I, Round 18 (substituted off) 67'	

=== Captains ===
Includes all competitions for senior teams. The list is sorted by squad number when season-total number of games where a player started as captain are equal. Players with no games started as captain not included in the list.

Rk.	No.	Pos.	Nat.	Player	Nemzeti Bajnokság I	Magyar Kupa	Season total
1	25	MF	(Hungary)	Gergő Holdampf	20	2	22
2	11	DF	(Hungary)	Dániel Gera	10	0	10
Total					30	2	32

== Attendances ==
The table contains the number of attendances of Diósgyőri VTK domestic matches.
Clicking on the competitions leads to the number of spectators for all the matches of the competitions.
The gold indicates the highest attendances, and the lowest attendances with pink .
Home stadium: Diósgyőri Stadion, Miskolc – Capacity: 15,325

League	Matches	Attendances	Average		High		Low	
League	Matches	Attendances	Att.	%	Att.	%	Att.	%
Nemzeti Bajnokság I	17	96,712	5,689	37.1%	10,344	67.5%	3,645	23.8%
Magyar Kupa	0	—	—	—	—	—	—	—
Total	17	96,712	5,689	37.1%	10,344	67.5%	3,645	23.8%

Nemzeti Bajnokság I
Round	Date	Opponent	Attendances	%	Ref
Round 1	28 July 2024	Paks	6,137	40.0%	
Round 3	10 August 2024	Ferencváros	8,050	52.5%	
Round 5	24 August 2024	Kecskemét	4,121	26.9%	
Round 6	31 August 2024	Győr	5,503	35.9%	
Round 8	28 September 2024	Zalaegerszeg	4,107	26.8%	
Round 10	19 October 2024	MTK	5,405	35.2%	
Round 13	10 November 2024	Fehérvár	5,135	33.5%	
Round 15	30 November 2024	Debrecen	5,518	36.0%	
Round 18	1 February 2025	Újpest	6,642	43.3%	
Round 20	15 February 2025	Nyíregyháza	7,552	49.3%	
Round 22	1 March 2025	Puskás Akadémia	3,645	23.8%	
Round 23	8 March 2025	Paks	4,703	30.7%	
Round 25	30 March 2025	Ferencváros	10,344	67.5%	
Round 27	11 April 2025	Kecskemét	4,617	30.1%	
Round 28	19 April 2025	Győr	6,198	40.4%	
Round 30	4 May 2025	Zalaegerszeg	4,632	30.2%	
Round 32	17 May 2025	MTK	4,303	28.7%	
Total			96,712	—	
Average			5,689	37.1%	—

Magyar Kupa
Round	Date	Opponent	Attendances	%	Ref
Total			0	—	
Average			0		—

== Awards and nominations ==
Keys
M	Matches	W	Won	D	Drawn	L	Lost
Pts	Points	GF	Goals for	GA	Goals against	GD	Goal difference
Pos.	Position	Pld	Played	G	Goals	A	Assists
(H)	Diósgyőri VTK were the home team.			(A)	Diósgyőri VTK were the away team.		
Player	Young Hungarian Player, who is a Hungarian player and was born 2004 or after						
Player^{*}	Player who joined Diósgyőri VTK permanently or on loan during the season						
Player^{†}	Player who departed Diósgyőri VTK permanently or on loan during the season						

=== Yearly awards ===
==== Rangadó Award Ceremony (Rangadó Gála) ====
Award	Manager or Player	Result	Ref.
2025 The Most Beautiful Goal of the Year	(Hungary) Ágoston Bényei	Won	

=== Monthly awards ===
Player of the Month, Coach of the Month, Most beautiful goal of the Month and Most beautiful saving of the Month by MLSZ (Hungarian Football Federation) and M4 Sport TV of Nemzeti Bajnokság.

Month	Player	Coach	Goal	Saving	Ref.
October				Artem Odyntsov in Round 11 vs Puskás Akadémia, Golla '88 min.	
November	Elton Acolatse	Vladimir Radenković	Ágoston Bényei in Round 14 vs Ferencváros		

=== Weekly awards ===
==== Selection of the Round ====
Selection of the Round of Nemzeti Bajnokság by M4 Sport TV, Nemzeti Sport, Csakfoci and Sofascore websites and Player of the Week (POW) by Nemzeti Sport.

Round	Opponent	Pos.	Player	Selection of the Round				POW	Ref.
Round	Opponent	Pos.	Player	Nemzeti Sport	M4 Sport TV	Csakfoci	Sofascore	POW	Ref.
Round 2	Fehérvár (A)	MF	(Hungary) Zétény Varga^{*}			Yes			
Round 3	Ferencváros (H)	GK	(Croatia) Karlo Sentić			Yes			
Round 4	Debrecen (A)	DF	(Bulgaria) Bozhidar Chorbadzhiyski			Yes			
Round 7	Újpest (A)	DF	(Hungary) Dániel Gera			Yes			
Round 7	Újpest (A)	DF	(Bulgaria) Bozhidar Chorbadzhiyski		Yes				
Round 8	Zalaegerszeg (H)	DF	(Hungary) Csaba Szatmári		Yes				
Round 9	Nyíregyháza (A)	DF	(Bosnia and Herzegovina) Siniša Saničanin		Yes	Yes			
Round 9	Nyíregyháza (A)	MF	(Hungary) Dániel Gera		Yes	Yes			
Round 9	Nyíregyháza (A)	FW	(Nigeria) Bright Edomwonyi		Yes				
Round 11	Puskás Akadémia (A)	GK	(Ukraine) Artem Odyntsov			Yes			
Round 11	Puskás Akadémia (A)	MF	(Hungary) Ágoston Bényei (s)			Yes			
Round 12	Paks (A)	FW	(Nigeria) Bright Edomwonyi		Yes	Yes			
Round 12	Paks (A)	FW	(Hungary) Gábor Jurek		Yes	Yes			
Round 13	Fehérvár (H)	FW	(Netherlands) Elton Acolatse			Yes			
Round 14	Ferencváros (A)	FW	(Netherlands) Elton Acolatse			Yes			
Round 15	Debrecen (H)	DF	(Hungary) Dániel Gera			Yes			
Round 15	Debrecen (H)	FW	(Netherlands) Elton Acolatse			Yes			
Round 17	Győr (A)	DF	(Hungary) Bence Bárdos			Yes			
Round 17	Győr (A)	FW	(Nigeria) Bright Edomwonyi			Yes			
Round 18	Újpest (H)	DF	(Hungary) Csaba Szatmári		Yes	Yes			
Round 22	Puskás Akadémia (H)	DF	(Bulgaria) Bozhidar Chorbadzhiyski		Yes				
Round 22	Puskás Akadémia (H)	MF	(Netherlands) Elton Acolatse			Yes	Yes		
Round 22	Puskás Akadémia (H)	MF	(Hungary) Gergő Holdampf			Yes			
Round 22	Puskás Akadémia (H)	FW	(Hungary) Gábor Jurek		Yes				

(s) Substitute

==== Goal of the Round ====
Goal of the Round of Nemzeti Bajnokság by the M4 Sport website.

Keys

- Score – The score at the time of the goal. Diósgyőri VTK's score listed first.
- Final score – The score at full time; Diósgyőri VTK's listed first.

Round	Pos.	Player	Placement	Score	Final score	Opponent	Date	Ref.

==== Goal of the Round ====
Goal of the Round of Nemzeti Bajnokság by the M4 Sport website.

Keys

- Score – The score at the time of the goal. Diósgyőri VTK's score listed first.
- Final score – The score at full time; Diósgyőri VTK's listed first.

Round	Pos.	Player	Placement	Score	Final score	Opponent	Date	Ref.

== Milestones ==
Keys
Final score	The score at full time; Diósgyőri VTK's listed first.	No.	Squad number	Pos.	Position
Opponent	The opponent team without a flag is Hungarian.	(N)	The game was played at a neutral site.		
(H)	Diósgyőri VTK were the home team.	(A)	Diósgyőri VTK were the away team.		
Player^{*}	Player who joined Diósgyőri VTK permanently or on loan during the season				
Player^{†}	Player who departed Diósgyőri VTK permanently or on loan during the season				

Debuts

The following players made their competitive debuts for Diósgyőri VTK's first team during the campaign.

Date	No.	Pos.	Player	Age	Final score	Opponent	Competition	Ref.
24 August 2024	16	DF	(Hungary) Bence Komlósi	18	1–0	Kecskemét (H)	NB I, Round 5	
19 October 2024	33	DF	(Republic of Ireland) Val Adedokun	21	0–2	MTK (H)	NB I, Round 10	
30 November 2024	67	FW	(Hungary) Szabolcs Sáreczki	18	3–1	Debrecen (H)	NB I, Round 15	
1 February 2025	22	MF	(Republic of Ireland) Christ Tiéhi	26	1–1	Újpest (H)	NB I, Round 18	
9 February 2025	51	GK	(Hungary) Barnabás Simon^{*}	19	1–2	Zalaegerszeg (A)	NB I, Round 19	
9 February 2025	72	DF	(Hungary) Kevin Kállai	23	1–2	Zalaegerszeg (A)	NB I, Round 19	
15 February 2025	70	FW	(Hungary) Alen Skribek^{*}	23	1–2	Nyíregyháza (H)	NB I, Round 20	
21 February 2025	85	DF	(Hungary) Bence Szakos	17	0–4	MTK (A)	NB I, Round 21	
30 March 2025	79	FW	(Hungary) Péter Benkő	22	1–1	Ferencváros (H)	NB I, Round 25	

50th appearances

The following players made their 50th appearances for Diósgyőri VTK's first team during the campaign.

Date	No.	Pos.	Player	Age	Final score	Opponent	Competition	Ref.

100th appearances

The following players made their 100th appearances for Diósgyőri VTK's first team during the campaign.

Date	No.	Pos.	Player	Age	Final score	Opponent	Competition	Ref.
14 December 2024	6	DF	(Hungary) Bence Bárdos	26	4–3	Győr (A)	Nemzeti Bajnokság, Round 17	

First goals

The following players scored their first goals for Diósgyőri VTK's first team during the campaign.

Keys

- Score – The score at the time of the goal. Diósgyőri VTK's score listed first.
- Final score – The score at full time; Diósgyőri VTK's listed first.

Date	No.	Pos.	Player	Age	Score	Final score	Opponent	Competition	Ref.
17 August 2024	5	DF	(Bulgaria) Bozhidar Chorbadzhiyski	29	1–0	1–0	Debrecen (A)	Nemzeti Bajnokság I, Round 4	
