= Gluščević =

Gluščević is a surname. Notable people with the surname include:

- Dejan Gluščević (born 1967), Serbian footballer
- Igor Gluščević (born 1974), Montenegrin footballer
- Matija Gluščević (born 2004), Serbian footballer
- Nikola Gluščević (born 2001), Montenegrin footballer
- Obrad Gluščević (1913–1980), Croatian film director
- Okica Gluščević (1856–1898), Serbian writer
- Vladimir Gluščević (born 1979), Montenegrin footballer
