= Uroš Drezgić =

Serbian association football player (born 2002)

Personal information
- Date of birth: 4 October 2002 (age 24)
- Place of birth: Šabac, FR Yugoslavia
- Height: 1.90 m (6 ft 3 in)
- Position: Defender

Team information
- Current team: Mačva Šabac (on loan from Rubin Kazan)

Youth career
- 2017–2019: OFK Beograd
- 2019–2020: Čukarički

Senior career*
| Years | Team | Apps | (Gls) |
| 2020–2023 | Čukarički | 58 | (3) |
| 2023– | Rubin Kazan | 0 | (0) |
| 2024–2025 | → Diósgyőr (loan) | 0 | (0) |
| 2026– | → Mačva Šabac (loan) | 0 | (0) |

International career^{‡}
| 2017 | Serbia U16 | 1 | (0) |
| 2018–2019 | Serbia U17 | 14 | (0) |
| 2019 | Serbia U18 | 4 | (1) |
| 2021 | Serbia U19 | 3 | (0) |
| 2021–2024 | Serbia U21 | 9 | (0) |
- * Club domestic league appearances and goals as of 24 May 2025 ‡ National team caps and goals as of 26 March 2024

Uroš Drezgić (Serbian Cyrillic: Урош Дрезгић, born 4 October 2002) is a Serbian footballer who plays as a defender for Mačva Šabac on loan from the Russian club Rubin Kazan.

== Club career ==
On 14 September 2023, Drezgić signed a four-year contract with the Russian Premier League club Rubin Kazan. On 5 July 2024, he joined Diósgyőr in Hungary on loan.

On 3 September 2026, Uroš moved on loan to his hometown club Mačva Šabac until the end of 2026.

== Career statistics ==
=== Club ===
As of 24 May 2025

| Club | Season | League | | | Cup | | Continental | | Total | |
| Club | Season | Division | Apps | Goals | Apps | Goals | Apps | Goals | Apps | Goals |
|---|---|---|---|---|---|---|---|---|---|---|
| Čukarički | 2019–20 | Serbian SuperLiga | 2 | 0 | 0 | 0 | 0 | 0 | 2 | 0 |
| Čukarički | 2020–21 | Serbian SuperLiga | 6 | 0 | 0 | 0 | – | | 6 | 0 |
| Čukarički | 2021–22 | Serbian SuperLiga | 17 | 0 | 0 | 0 | 3 (Note: Appearances in the UEFA Europa Conference League) | 0 | 20 | 0 |
| Čukarički | 2022–23 | Serbian SuperLiga | 27 | 2 | 2 | 0 | 3 | 0 | 32 | 2 |
| Čukarički | 2023–24 | Serbian SuperLiga | 6 | 1 | – | | 2 (Note: Appearances in the UEFA Europa League) | 0 | 8 | 1 |
| Čukarički | Total | | 58 | 3 | 2 | 0 | 8 | 0 | 68 | 3 |
| Rubin Kazan | 2023–24 | Russian Premier League | 0 | 0 | 2 | 0 | – | | 2 | 0 |
| Rubin Kazan | 2025–26 | Russian Premier League | 0 | 0 | 0 | 0 | – | | 0 | 0 |
| Rubin Kazan | Total | | 0 | 0 | 0 | 0 | 0 | 0 | 2 | 0 |
| Diósgyőr (loan) | 2024–25 | NB I | 0 | 0 | 0 | 0 | – | | 0 | 0 |
| Career total | | | 58 | 3 | 4 | 0 | 8 | 0 | 70 | 3 |
