= Argyris Kampetsis =

Greek footballer

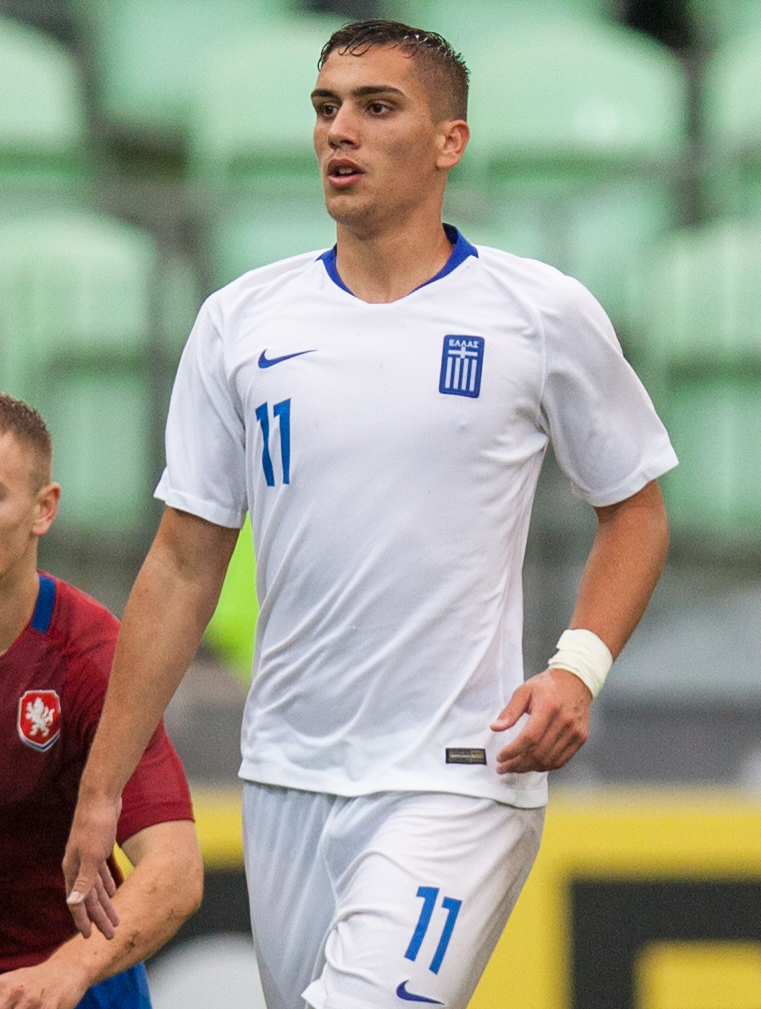
- Kampetsis with Greece in 2019

Personal information
- Full name: Anargyros Kampetsis
- Date of birth: 6 May 1999 (age 27)
- Place of birth: Athens, Greece
- Height: 1.86 m (6 ft 1 in)
- Position: Forward

Team information
- Current team: AEL
- Number: 11

Youth career
- 2005–2006: Aris Petroupolis
- 2006–2008: AEK Athens
- 2008–2017: Olympiacos

Senior career*
| Years | Team | Apps | (Gls) |
| 2017–2018 | Borussia Dortmund II | 14 | (0) |
| 2018–2023 | Panathinaikos | 57 | (5) |
| 2021–2022 | → Willem II (loan) | 17 | (0) |
| 2023–2025 | Diósgyőr | 21 | (0) |
| 2025 | Karmiotissa | 15 | (2) |
| 2025–2026 | Anagennisi Karditsa | 17 | (5) |
| 2026– | AEL | 3 | (3) |

International career^{‡}
| 2015–2016 | Greece U17 | 5 | (0) |
| 2017 | Greece U18 | 6 | (1) |
| 2017–2018 | Greece U19 | 19 | (6) |
| 2019–2020 | Greece U21 | 12 | (4) |
- * Club domestic league appearances and goals as of 21 September 2026 ‡ National team caps and goals as of 13 November 2020

Argyris Kampetsis (Greek: Αργύρης Καμπετσής; born 6 May 1999), also known as Anargyros Kampetsis, is a Greek professional footballer who plays as a forward for Super League 2 club AEL.

== Career ==
Kampetsis started playing as a 5 year old for Aris Petroupolis and within 2 years, he was unearthed by AEK Athens legend, Toni Savevski at a tournament in the Athens suburb of Pallini. After playing for AEK Athens Academies he moved to Olympiacos Academies where his career really took off and went to the next level. His dominance, goal scoring record and all-round game at youth level could not be ignored, and as a result, he became a regular in the youth divisions of the national team. He attracted interest from top clubs from England, Germany and Italy but it was German giants Borussia Dortmund who made him the best offer. One that Olympiakos could not match as his playing time would not be guaranteed by then manager Paulo Bento.

He plays mainly as a forward, and joined Panathinaikos from the ranks of Borussia Dortmund II. Kampetsis made his first professional appearance for the team in the 2018–19 Super League game against Lamia on September 1, 2018. On 23 September 2018, he scored his first goal with the club in a 3–0 home win game against Levadiakos.

On 29 May 2021, Kampetsis is expected to continue his career in Süper Lig club Göztepe, for the amount of €500,000. Kampetsis has reached an agreement with the Turkish club, with whom he is expected to sign a three-year contract. Few months ago had renewed his contract with Panathinaikos until the summer of 2024. However, the deal fell through.

On 31 August 2021, he joined Willem II on a season-long loan, with a purchase option of €700,000.

== Career statistics ==
As of 2 April 2026

| Club | Season | League | | | Cup | | Continental | | Other | | Total | |
| Club | Season | Division | Apps | Goals | Apps | Goals | Apps | Goals | Apps | Goals | Apps | Goals |
|---|---|---|---|---|---|---|---|---|---|---|---|---|
| Borussia Dortmund II | 2017–18 | 3. Liga | 14 | 0 | — | | — | | — | | 14 | 0 |
| Panathinaikos | 2018–19 | Super League Greece | 20 | 2 | 4 | 1 | — | | — | | 24 | 3 |
| Panathinaikos | 2019–20 | Super League Greece | 18 | 0 | 2 | 1 | — | | — | | 20 | 1 |
| Panathinaikos | 2020–21 | Super League Greece | 19 | 3 | 1 | 0 | — | | — | | 20 | 3 |
| Panathinaikos | 2022–23 | Super League Greece | 0 | 0 | 1 | 0 | 2 | 0 | — | | 3 | 0 |
| Panathinaikos | Total | | 57 | 5 | 8 | 2 | 2 | 0 | 0 | 0 | 67 | 7 |
| Willem (loan) | 2021–22 | Eredivisie | 17 | 0 | 1 | 0 | — | | — | | 18 | 0 |
| Diósgyőr | 2023–24 | NB I | 17 | 0 | 3 | 0 | — | | — | | 20 | 0 |
| Diósgyőr | 2024–25 | NB I | 4 | 0 | 2 | 0 | — | | — | | 6 | 0 |
| Diósgyőr | Total | | 21 | 0 | 5 | 0 | — | | — | | 26 | 0 |
| Karmiotissa | 2024–25 | Cypriot First Division | 15 | 2 | 0 | 0 | — | | — | | 15 | 2 |
| Anagennisi Karditsa | 2025–26 | Superleague Greece 2 | 17 | 5 | 0 | 0 | — | | — | | 17 | 5 |
| Career total | | | 141 | 12 | 14 | 2 | 2 | 0 | 0 | 0 | 157 | 14 |
