= Val Adedokun =

Irish footballer (born 2003)

Personal information
- Full name: Valentino Mayowa Adedokun
- Date of birth: 14 February 2003 (age 23)
- Place of birth: Dublin, Ireland
- Height: 1.77 m (5 ft 10 in)
- Position: Left back

Team information
- Current team: Brentford

Youth career
- 2007–2014: River Valley Rangers
- 2014–2017: Malahide United
- 2017–2020: Dundalk

Senior career*
Years	Team	Apps	(Gls)
2020–2021	Dundalk	7	(0)
2021–	Brentford	0	(0)
2024	→ Diósgyőr (loan)	3	(0)
2025	→ Cheltenham Town (loan)	15	(0)

International career
2018	Republic of Ireland U15	1	(0)
2021	Republic of Ireland U19	3	(0)
- * Club domestic league appearances and goals as of 10:25, 25 August 2026 (UTC)

Valentino Mayowa Adedokun (born 14 February 2003) is an Irish professional footballer who plays as a left back for Premier League club Brentford.

Adedokun is a product of the Malahide United and Dundalk youth systems and began his senior career at the latter club, before transferring to Brentford in 2021. He was capped by the Republic of Ireland at youth level.

== Club career ==
=== Dundalk ===
After beginning his career in the River Valley Rangers and Malahide United youth systems, Adedokun moved into the Dundalk academy in 2017 and progressed to sign his first professional contract in January 2020. He won his maiden first team call up for a League of Ireland Premier Division match versus Shamrock Rovers on 27 September 2020 and made his debut as a substitute for Will Patching late in the 4–0 defeat. Adedokun signed a new two-year contract in January 2021. During the 2021 season, Adedokun was a regular inclusion in matchday squads as a substitute and made eight appearances (four of them starts), before departing Oriel Park in August 2021. During his time with Dundalk, Adedokun was converted from a winger to a left back.

=== Brentford ===
==== 2021–2023 ====
On 24 August 2021, Adedokun transferred to the B team at Premier League club Brentford and signed three-year contract, with the option of a further year, for an undisclosed fee. During the 2021–22 season, he gained experience as a left wing back, participated in first team training sessions and was a member of the B team's London Senior Cup-winning squad.

After missing much of the 2022–23 pre-season due to COVID-19 and a dislocated shoulder, Adedokun's 37 appearances during the regular season was the most of any B team player. He appeared in every minute of the B team's victorious 2022–23 Premier League Cup-winning campaign and made a first team mid-season friendly appearance against La Liga side Celta Vigo.

==== 2023–24 season ====
Adedokun's first team involvement continued during the 2023–24 pre-season, with one substitute appearance. Due to a season-ending injury suffered by first team left back Rico Henry and with no specialist backup available for stand-in Aaron Hickey (who himself then suffered a season-ending injury), Adedokun was an unused substitute on seven occasions during the first half of the regular season. Adedokun captained the B team during the 2023–24 season and signed a new two-year contract, with a one-year option, in February 2024. His performances in his 34 appearances during the 2023–24 season were recognised with the B team Player of the Year award.

==== 2024–2026 and loans to Diósgyőr and Cheltenham Town ====
On 23 September 2024, Adedokun joined Hungarian Nemzeti Bajnokság I club Diósgyőr on loan until the end of the 2024–25 season. He made three appearances before being recalled at the turn of the year. On 8 January 2025, Adedokun joined League Two club Cheltenham Town on loan until the end of the 2024–25 season. Prior to suffering a season-ending injury with four matches to play, Adedokun made 17 appearances.

Adedokun was absent from the Brentford B squad until the final match of the 2025–26 season, when he was an unused substitute in a 3–1 friendly defeat to Paris Saint-Germain U21. He signed a new undisclosed-length contract in August 2026.

== International career ==
Adedokun is eligible to represent the Republic of Ireland or Nigeria at international level. He was capped once by the Republic of Ireland at U15 level and was later named a standby for a pair of U17 friendlies versus Switzerland in March 2020. Adedokun was called into U19 training camps in June, September and October 2021, with the latter camp including a pair of friendly matches versus Sweden, both of which he appeared in. Adedokun's third and final U19 cap came as a substitute late in a 1–1 2022 European U19 Championship qualifying draw with Bosnia and Herzegovina on 13 November 2021.

== Personal life ==
Adedokun is of Nigerian descent. He attended Colaiste Choilm in Swords.

== Career statistics ==
As of match played 21 April 2025

Appearances and goals by club, season and competition
Club	Season	League			National cup (Note: Includes FAI Cup, FA Cup, Magyar Kupa)		League cup (Note: Includes EFL Cup)		Europe		Other		Total	
Club	Season	Division	Apps	Goals	Apps	Goals	Apps	Goals	Apps	Goals	Apps	Goals	Apps	Goals
Dundalk	2020	League of Ireland Premier Division	1	0	0	0	―		0	0	―		1	0
Dundalk	2021	League of Ireland Premier Division	6	0	1	0	―		1 (Note: Appearance in UEFA Europa Conference League)	0	―		8	0
Dundalk	Total		7	0	1	0	―		1	0	―		9	0
Brentford	2023–24	Premier League	0	0	0	0	0	0	―		―		0	0
Diósgyőr (loan)	2024–25	Nemzeti Bajnokság I	3	0	0	0	―		―		―		3	0
Cheltenham Town (loan)	2024–25	League Two	15	0	―		―		―		2 (Note: Appearances in EFL Trophy)	0	17	0
Career total			25	0	1	0	0	0	1	0	2	0	29	0

== Honours ==
Dundalk

- President of Ireland's Cup: 2021
- Jim Malone Cup: 2021

Brentford B

- London Senior Cup: 2021–22
- Premier League Cup: 2022–23

Individual

- Brentford B Player of the Year: 2023–24
