= Vladislav Klimovich =

Belarusian footballer

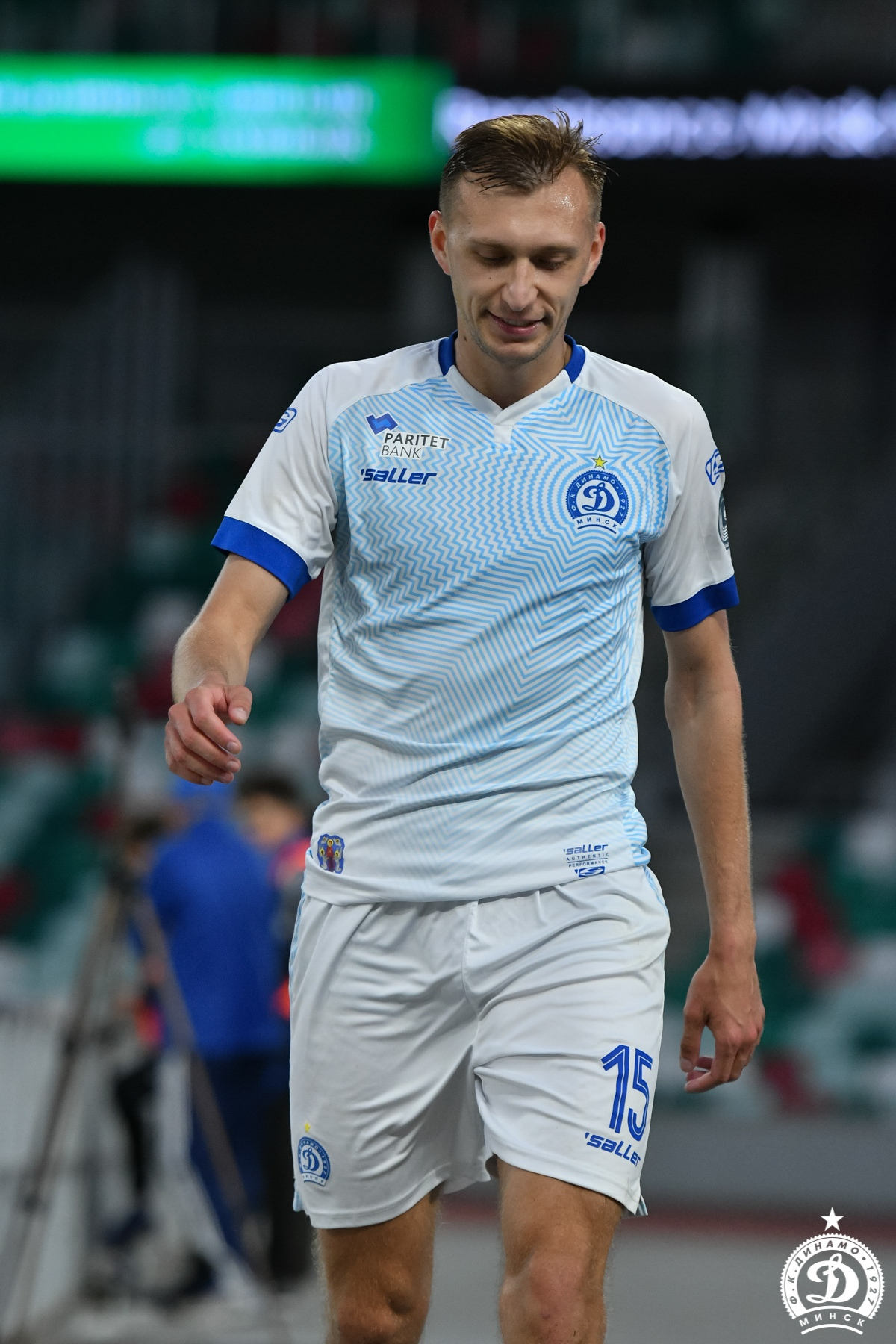
- Klimovich with Dinamo Minsk in 2020

Personal information
- Full name: Vladislav Tadeushevich Klimovich
- Date of birth: 12 June 1996 (age 30)
- Place of birth: Minsk, Belarus
- Height: 1.87 m (6 ft 1 1/2 in)
- Position: Forward

Team information
- Current team: Caspiy
- Number: 17

Youth career
- 2013–2014: BATE Borisov

Senior career*
| Years | Team | Apps | (Gls) |
| 2014–2017 | BATE Borisov | 2 | (0) |
| 2015 | → Isloch Minsk Raion (loan) | 11 | (5) |
| 2016 | → Jelgava (loan) | 10 | (2) |
| 2016–2017 | → Neman Grodno (loan) | 32 | (1) |
| 2018–2019 | Torpedo-BelAZ Zhodino | 56 | (8) |
| 2020–2021 | Dinamo Minsk | 58 | (12) |
| 2022 | Gyirmót | 14 | (0) |
| 2022–2023 | Nea Salamina | 27 | (3) |
| 2023–2025 | Diósgyőr | 53 | (4) |
| 2025 | Torpedo-BelAZ Zhodino | 14 | (1) |
| 2026 | Irtysh Pavlodar | 12 | (0) |
| 2026– | Caspiy | 15 | (3) |

International career^{‡}
| 2015–2018 | Belarus U21 | 36 | (2) |
| 2017 | Belarus B | 2 | (0) |
| 2017– | Belarus | 43 | (1) |
- * Club domestic league appearances and goals as of 1 November 2026 ‡ National team caps and goals as of 15 November 2024

Vladislav Tadeushevich Klimovich (Belarusian: Уладзіслаў Тадэвушавіч Клімовіч; Russian: Владислав Тадеушевич Климович; born 12 June 1996) is a Belarusian professional footballer who plays for Caspiy.

== International goal ==
Scores and results list Belarus' goal tally first.

| No | Date | Venue | Opponent | Score | Result | Competition |
|---|---|---|---|---|---|---|
| 1. | 11 November 2020 | Ilie Oană Stadium, Ploiești, Romania | Romania | 3–5 | 3–5 | Friendly match |

== Honours ==
BATE Borisov

- Belarusian Premier League: 2014
- Belarusian Super Cup: 2015

Jelgava

- Latvian Football Cup: 2015–16
