= Bence Bárdos =

Hungarian footballer

Personal information
- Date of birth: 2 May 1998 (age 28)
- Place of birth: Ózd, Hungary
- Height: 1.90 m (6 ft 3 in)
- Positions: Centre-back; left-back

Team information
- Current team: Diósgyőr
- Number: 6

Youth career
- 2007–2011: Ózd
- 2011–2017: Diósgyőr

Senior career*
| Years | Team | Apps | (Gls) |
| 2017– | Diósgyőr | 120 | (9) |
| 2019–2021 | → Szolnok (loan) | 45 | (2) |
- * Club domestic league appearances and goals as of 30 May 2026

Bence Bárdos (born 2 May 1998) is a Hungarian professional footballer who plays for Hungarian first division club Diósgyőr.

== Club statistics ==
Appearances and goals by club, season and competition
| Club | Season | League | | | Cup | | Europe | | Total | |
| Club | Season | Division | Apps | Goals | Apps | Goals | Apps | Goals | Apps | Goals |
|---|---|---|---|---|---|---|---|---|---|---|
| Diósgyőr II. | 2016–17 | Nemzeti Bajnokság III | 2 | 0 | - | - | - | - | 2 | 0 |
| Diósgyőr II. | 2017–18 | Nemzeti Bajnokság III | 19 | 1 | - | - | - | - | 19 | 1 |
| Diósgyőr II. | 2018–19 | Nemzeti Bajnokság III | 14 | 4 | - | - | - | - | 14 | 4 |
| Diósgyőr II. | 2021–22 | Nemzeti Bajnokság III | 1 | 0 | - | - | - | - | 1 | 0 |
| Diósgyőr II. | 2024–25 | Nemzeti Bajnokság III | 4 | 0 | - | - | - | - | 4 | 0 |
| Diósgyőr II. | 2025–26 | Nemzeti Bajnokság III | 1 | 0 | - | - | - | - | 1 | 0 |
| Diósgyőr II. | Total | | 41 | 5 | - | - | - | - | 41 | 5 |
| Diósgyőr | 2017–18 | Nemzeti Bajnokság I | 3 | 0 | 2 | 1 | — | | 5 | 1 |
| Diósgyőr | 2018–19 | Nemzeti Bajnokság I | 7 | 0 | 2 | 0 | — | | 9 | 0 |
| Diósgyőr | 2021–22 | Nemzeti Bajnokság II | 26 | 1 | 1 | 0 | - | - | 27 | 1 |
| Diósgyőr | 2022–23 | Nemzeti Bajnokság II | 37 | 4 | 1 | 0 | - | - | 38 | 4 |
| Diósgyőr | 2023–24 | Nemzeti Bajnokság II | 10 | 1 | 1 | 0 | - | - | 11 | 1 |
| Diósgyőr | 2024–25 | Nemzeti Bajnokság II | 19 | 3 | 2 | 0 | - | - | 21 | 3 |
| Diósgyőr | 2025–26 | Nemzeti Bajnokság I | 17 | 0 | 2 | 0 | - | - | 19 | 0 |
| Diósgyőr | Total | | 119 | 9 | 11 | 1 | - | - | 130 | 10 |
| Szolnoki MÁV | 2019–20 | Nemzeti Bajnokság II | 12 | 0 | 1 | 0 | - | - | 13 | 0 |
| Szolnoki MÁV | 2020–21 | Nemzeti Bajnokság II | 33 | 2 | 3 | 0 | - | - | 36 | 2 |
| Szolnoki MÁV | Total | | 45 | 2 | 4 | 0 | - | - | 49 | 2 |
| Career total | | | 205 | 16 | 15 | 1 | 0 | 0 | 220 | 17 |

Updated to games played as of 9 May 2026.
