= Gergő Holdampf =

Hungarian footballer (born 1994)

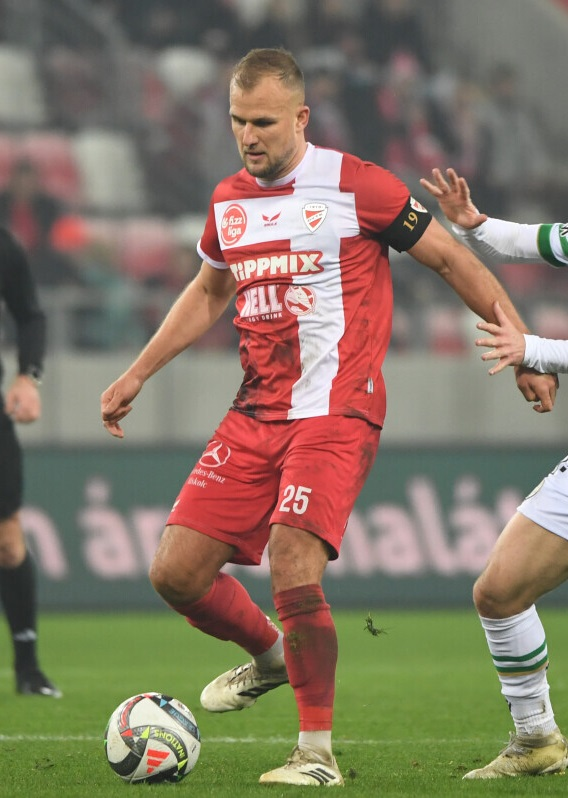
- Holdampf playing for Diósgyőr in 2025

Personal information
- Date of birth: 31 July 1994 (age 32)
- Place of birth: Sopron, Hungary
- Height: 1.81 m (5 ft 11 in)
- Position: Midfielder

Team information
- Current team: Diósgyőr
- Number: 25

Youth career
- 2003–2009: Sopron
- 2009–2012: Zalaegerszeg
- 2012–2013: Újpest
- 2013: Chemnitzer FC

Senior career*
Years	Team	Apps	(Gls)
2013–2014	Zalaegerszeg	17	(1)
2014–2016	Újpest	0	(0)
2015	→ Sopron (loan)	40	(0)
2016–2018	Nyíregyháza	55	(0)
2018	Budapest Honvéd	2	(0)
2019–2022	Haladás	101	(3)
2022–	Diósgyőr	115	(2)

International career
2014	Hungary U-20	1	(0)
- * Club domestic league appearances and goals as of 30 May 2026

Gergő Holdampf (born 31 July 1994) is a Hungarian professional footballer who plays as a midfielder for Nemzeti Bajnokság I club Diósgyőr.

== Career ==
=== Budapest Honvéd ===
On 20 October 2018, Holdampf played his first match for Budapest Honvéd in a 1–1 draw against MTK Budapest in the Hungarian League.

=== Diósgyőr ===
On 20 June 2022, Holdampf signed with Diósgyőr.

== Career statistics ==
Appearances and goals by club, season and competition
Club	Season	League			Cup		League Cup		Europe		Total	
Club	Season	Division	Apps	Goals	Apps	Goals	Apps	Goals	Apps	Goals	Apps	Goals
Újpest
Újpest	2012–13	Nemzeti Bajnokság I	0	0	0	0	1	0	0	0	1	0
Újpest	2014–15	Nemzeti Bajnokság I	0	0	1	0	4	0	0	0	5	0
Újpest	Total		0	0	1	0	5	0	0	0	6	0
Zalaegerszeg	2013–14	Nemzeti Bajnokság II	17	1	0	0	2	0	—		19	1
Sopron
Sopron	2014–15	Nemzeti Bajnokság II	11	0	0	0	0	0	—		11	0
Sopron	2015–16	Nemzeti Bajnokság II	29	0	4	0	—		—		33	0
Sopron	Total		40	0	4	0	0	0	0	0	44	0
Nyíregyháza
Nyíregyháza	2016–17	Nemzeti Bajnokság II	30	0	2	0	—		—		32	0
Nyíregyháza	2015–16	Nemzeti Bajnokság II	25	0	3	0	—		—		28	0
Nyíregyháza	Total		55	0	5	0	0	0	0	0	60	0
Budapest Honvéd	2018–19	Nemzeti Bajnokság I	2	0	2	0	—		—		4	0
Haladás	2018–19	Nemzeti Bajnokság I	8	0	1	0	—		—		9	0
Career total			122	1	13	0	7	0	0	0	142	1

Updated to games played as of 4 May 2019.
