= Vladimir Gluščević =

Montenegrin footballer

Personal information
- Date of birth: 20 October 1979 (age 47)
- Place of birth: Kotor, SFR Yugoslavia
- Height: 1.91 m (6 ft 3 in)
- Position: Forward

Senior career*
Years	Team	Apps	(Gls)
1999–2003	Mogren	97	(39)
2003–2004	Sparta Prague	4	(0)
2004	Budućnost Podgorica	8	(2)
2005	Borac Čačak	4	(0)
2005–2006	Rad	15	(3)
2006–2007	Politehnica Timișoara	10	(1)
2007–2010	Mogren	98	(49)
2011	Albacete	5	(0)
2011	Mogren	3	(2)
2011–2013	Hapoel Haifa	55	(17)

International career^{‡}
2009	Montenegro	1	(0)
- * Club domestic league appearances and goals as of 10 October 2009 ‡ National team caps and goals as of 24 December 2009

Vladimir Gluščević (Cyrillic: Владимир Глушчевић; born 20 October 1979) is a retired Montenegrin footballer who last played for Hapoel Haifa.

== Club career ==
Czech Sparta Prague, Montenegrin FK Budućnost Podgorica, Serbian FK Borac Čačak and FK Rad and Romanian FC Politehnica Timișoara were the clubs he represented beside his first professional club FK Mogren where he returned in summer 2007, and where he won the Montenegrin Championship in the 2008–09 season.

== International career ==
Gluščević made his debut for Montenegro in a November 2009 friendly match against Belarus, coming on as a final minute substitute for Simon Vukčević. It remained his sole international appearance.

== Personal life ==
Vladimir's older brother, Igor Gluščević, was also a footballer.

== Honours ==
Sparta Prague

- Czech Cup: 2003–04

Mogren

- Montenegrin First League: 2008–09, 2010–11
- Montenegrin Cup: 2007–08
