= Artem Odyntsov =

Ukrainian footballer (born 2000)

Personal information
- Full name: Artem Yuriyovych Odyntsov
- Date of birth: 9 November 2000 (age 26)
- Place of birth: Khartsyzk, Ukraine
- Height: 1.95 m (6 ft 5 in)
- Position: Goalkeeper

Team information
- Current team: Zimbru Chișinău
- Number: 12

Youth career
- 2013–2014: KhAF Trubnyk Khartsyzk
- 2014–2017: Azovstal Mariupol
- 2017–2018: Munkach Mukachevo
- 2018–2019: Kisvárda

Senior career*
Years	Team	Apps	(Gls)
2019–2023	Kisvárda II	67	(0)
2021–2023	Kisvárda	10	(0)
2023	Diósgyőr	39	(0)
2023–2025	Diósgyőr II	4	(0)
2025–2026	Andijon	0	(0)
2026–	Zimbru Chișinău	5	(0)
- * Club domestic league appearances and goals as of 1 June 2026

Artem Yuriyovych Odyntsov (Ukrainian: Артем Юрійович Одинцов; born 9 November 2000) is a Ukrainian professional footballer who plays as a goalkeeper for Moldovan Liga club Zimbru Chișinău.

== Kisvárda ==
He was signed by Kisvárda in 2019. In his first season he played for the U19 team. He made his first team debut on 19 September 2020 in the Hungarian Cup against Kecskéd KSK. He made his Hungarian first division debut as a substitute in the 82nd minute, replacing Dávid Dombó against Paks on 9 May 2021. He played a total of 10 matches for Kisvárda first team out of which he did not concede a goal on 6 matches. At the end of the 2021-2022 season, Kisvárda qualified for the first time in their history to an international cup. Odincov defended Kisvárda's goal in all four matches in the Europa Conference League qualifiers against Kairat Almaty and Molde.

== Diósgyőr ==
On 16 June 2023, he signed for Diósgyőr. He made his debut in a competitive match for Diósgyőr, against Kecskemét in the Hungarian first division on 1 October 2023.

== Andijon ==
On 13 July 2025, he signed for FC Andijon.

== Personal life ==
In an interview, Odincov mentioned that he has a Hungarian wife and a child called Maxim. For now, he only has Ukrainian citizenship, but the player plans to become a Hungarian citizen soon.
