= Igor Gluščević =

Montenegrin footballer

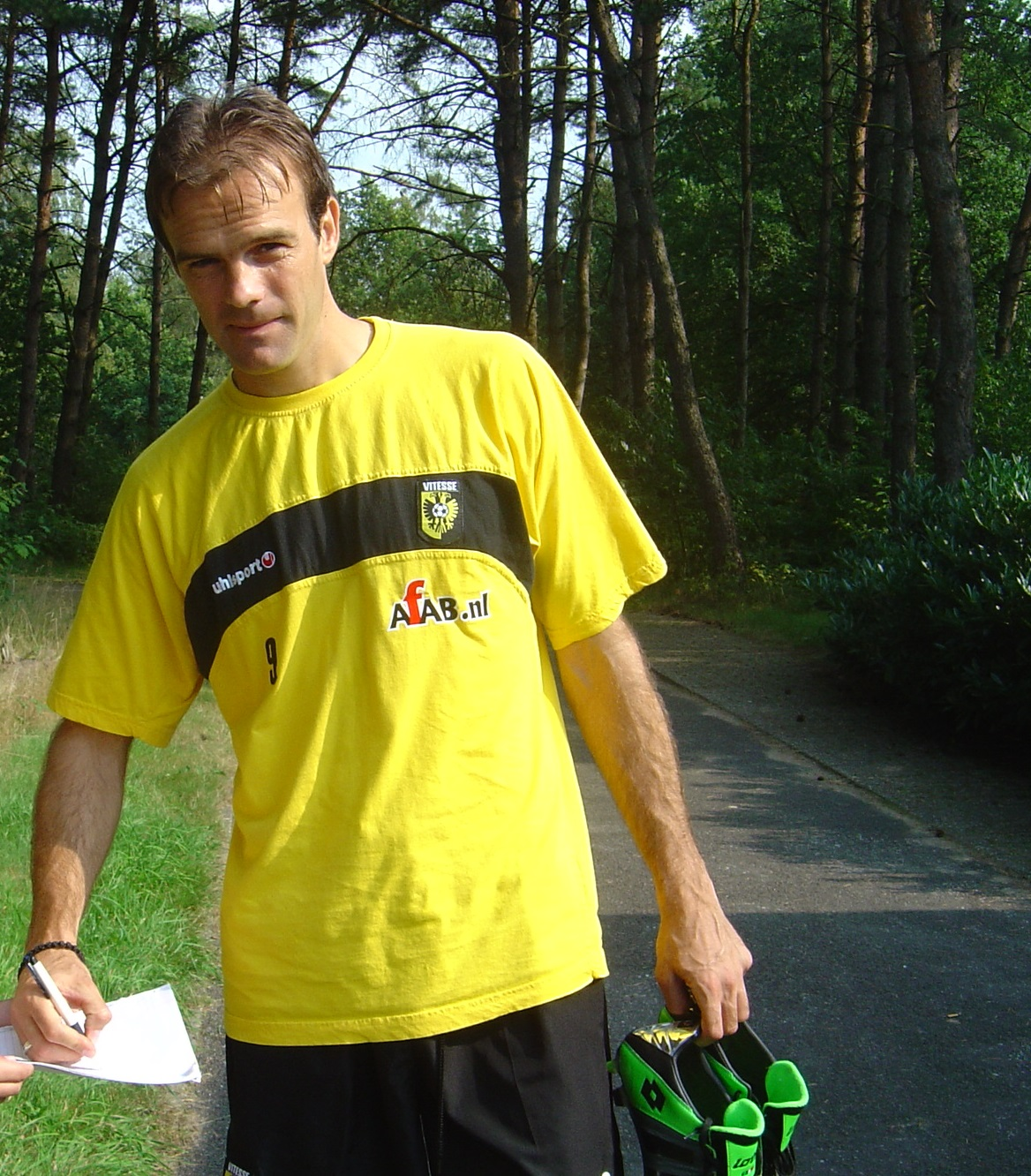
- Gluščević as a Vitesse player in 2004

Personal information
- Full name: Igor Gluščević
- Date of birth: 30 March 1974 (age 52)
- Place of birth: Budva, SFR Yugoslavia
- Height: 1.90 m (6 ft 3 in)
- Position: Striker

Senior career*
Years	Team	Apps	(Gls)
1992–1994	Mogren	59	(20)
1994–1996	Vojvodina	46	(7)
1996–1998	Extremadura	57	(26)
1998–2000	Sevilla	30	(6)
1999–2000	→ Aris (loan)	30	(8)
2000–2003	Utrecht	84	(39)
2003–2004	Sparta Prague	18	(3)
2004–2006	Vitesse	36	(6)
2006	Shandong Luneng	7	(1)
2007–2008	Heracles	38	(7)
Total		405	(123)
- * Club domestic league appearances and goals

Igor Gluščević (born 30 March 1974) is a Montenegrin retired footballer who played as a striker.

== Club career ==
Born in Budva, Socialist Republic of Montenegro, Socialist Federal Republic of Yugoslavia, Gluščević started his professional career with FK Vojvodina. After scoring seven goals in two seasons, he signed with Spanish club CF Extremadura: having featured sparingly as the team was relegated from La Liga in 1997, he netted 24 times for an immediate promotion back, being crowned the competition's top scorer.

However, Gluščević decided to stay in Segunda División, moving to Sevilla FC and being an important attacking element in the Andalusians' 1999 promotion. At the end of the campaign, he joined Aris in Greece on loan.

After another sole season, Gluščević signed for FC Utrecht, where he experienced his most prolific years which included winning the 2003 edition of the KNVB Cup, scoring twice in the final. After a brief spell with Sparta Prague he returned to the Netherlands, this time with Vitesse Arnhem, failing to find the net in his second year.

Having started 2006-07 in China with Shandong Luneng Taishan FC, Gluščević moved once again to Holland in January 2007, joining Heracles Almelo and being released at the end of the 2007–08 season, following which he retired at the age of 34.

== Personal life ==
Gluščević's younger brother, Vladimir, was also a footballer and a forward. He too played with Mogren, Sparta Prague and in Spain. His son, Nikola, is playing for Kolubara as a striker.

== Honours ==
Utrecht

- KNVB Cup: 2002–03
