= Marko Rakonjac =

Montenegrin footballer

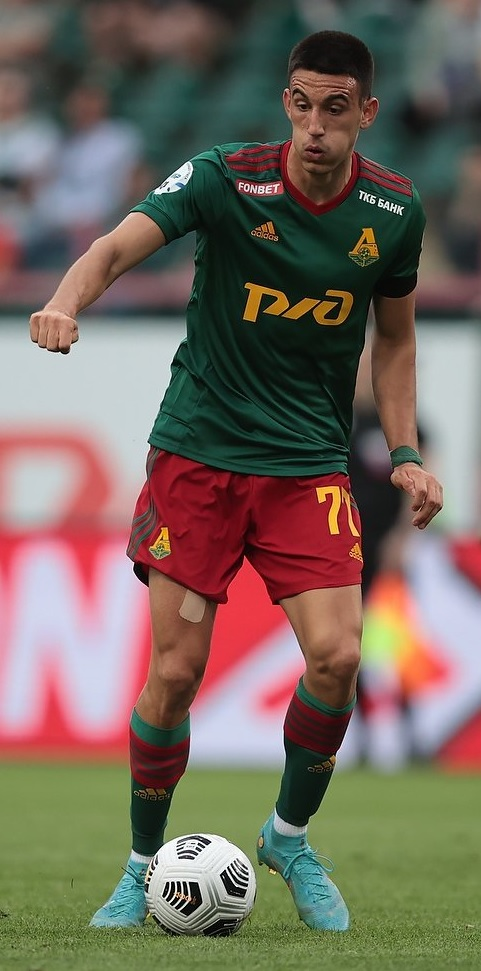
- Rakonjac with Lokomotiv Moscow in 2022

Personal information
- Date of birth: 25 April 2000 (age 26)
- Place of birth: Bijelo Polje, FR Yugoslavia
- Height: 1.91 m (6 ft 3 in)
- Position: Centre-forward

Team information
- Current team: Hapoel Jerusalem

Youth career
- Jedinstvo Bijelo Polje
- 2017–2020: Čukarički

Senior career*
Years	Team	Apps	(Gls)
2016	Jedinstvo Bijelo Polje	6	(0)
2019–2022	Čukarički	60	(15)
2019–2020	→ IMT (loan)	16	(14)
2022–2025	Lokomotiv Moscow	12	(0)
2023	→ Red Star Belgrade (loan)	13	(4)
2023–2024	→ TSC (loan)	23	(2)
2024–2025	→ Diósgyőr (loan)	28	(6)
2025–2026	OFI	13	(0)
2026	Hapoel Jerusalem	14	(2)
2026–	Maccabi Petah Tikva	0	(0)

International career^{‡}
2016–2017	Montenegro U17	6	(3)
2018	Montenegro U19	3	(0)
2020–2022	Montenegro U21	7	(2)
2022	Montenegro	1	(0)
- * Club domestic league appearances and goals as of 24 June 2026 ‡ National team caps and goals as of 24 March 2022

Marko Rakonjac (Serbian Cyrillic: Марко Ракоњац; born 25 April 2000) is a Montenegrin professional footballer who plays as a centre-forward for Israeli Premier League club Maccabi Petah Tikva.

== Club career ==
On 28 April 2022, Rakonjac signed a four-year contract with Russian Premier League club Lokomotiv Moscow, beginning in the 2022–23 season.

On 2 February 2023, Rakonjac returned to Serbia to join Red Star Belgrade on loan until the end of the season with the option to buy.

On 27 July 2023, Rakonjac moved on a new season-long loan to TSC with an option to buy.

On 2 July 2024, Rakonjac moved on a new loan to Diósgyőr in Hungary.

On 4 July 2025, Rakonjac's contract with Lokomotiv was terminated by mutual consent.

On 3 August 2025, Rakonjac signed a two-year contract with OFI in Greece.

On 15 January 2026, Rakonjac signed a season-long contract with Hapoel Jerusalem in Israel.

== International career ==
Rakonjac was capped for the Montenegro U17, U19 and U21 national team squads before becoming part of Montenegro national football team, and debuting as a substitution in a friendly win against Greece.

== Career statistics ==
As of 27 November 2022

Club	Season	League			Cup		Continental		Total	
Club	Season	Division	Apps	Goals	Apps	Goals	Apps	Goals	Apps	Goals
Jedinstvo Bijelo Polje	2016–17	Montenegrin First League	6	0	–		–		6	0
Čukarički	2018–19	Serbian SuperLiga	0	0	0	0	–		0	0
Čukarički	2020–21	Serbian SuperLiga	31	1	1	0	–		32	1
Čukarički	2021–22	Serbian SuperLiga	26	11	1	0	1 (Note: Appearance in the UEFA Europa Conference League)	0	28	11
Čukarički	Total		57	12	2	0	1	0	60	12
Lokomotiv Moscow	2022–23	RPL	12	0	3	0	–		15	0
Career total			75	12	5	0	1	0	81	12

== Honours ==
Red Star Belgrade

- Serbian SuperLiga: 2022–23
- Serbian Cup: 2022–23

Individual

- Serbian SuperLiga Player of the Week: 2021–22 (Round 25)
