= Nikola Gluščević =

Montenegrin footballer (born 2001)

Personal information
- Date of birth: 11 June 2001 (age 25)
- Place of birth: Montenegro
- Height: 1.96 m (6 ft 5 in)
- Position: Striker

Team information
- Current team: Petrovac
- Number: 99

Senior career*
Years	Team	Apps	(Gls)
2018	Grbalj	1	(0)
2018–2020	Sevilla	0	(0)
2020	→ OFK Titograd (loan)	5	(0)
2020–2021	Proleter Novi Sad	10	(0)
2021–2022	Budućnost Dobanovci	0	(0)
2022–2023	Radnički Beograd	9	(0)
2023	Kolubara	1	(0)
2024	Dekani	3	(0)
2024	Diósgyőr	0	(0)
2025–	Petrovac	2	(0)
- * Club domestic league appearances and goals as of 1 June 2025

Nikola Gluščević (born 11 June 2001) is a Montenegrin footballer who plays for Petrovac.

== Career ==
In 2018, Gluščević signed for Spanish La Liga side Sevilla, where his father, Igor, played.

For the second half of 2019–20, he was sent on loan to OFK Titograd in Montenegro.

In 2020, he signed for Serbian top flight club Proleter Novi Sad.
