= 2019–20 UAE League Cup =

2019–20 Arabian Gulf League
Tournament details
- Country: UAE
- Teams: 14

Final positions
- Champions: Al Nasr (2nd title)
- Runners-up: Shabab Al Ahli

Tournament statistics
- Matches played: 49
- Goals scored: 138 (2.82 per match)
- Top goal scorer(s): Pedro Conde; Fábio Lima (7 goals each)

The 2019–20 UAE League Cup was the 12th season of the UAE League Cup. The season started on August 22, 2019.

== Group stage ==
=== Group A ===
Team	Pld	W	D	L	GF	GA	GD	Pts
Al Ain	6	3	2	1	13	8	+5	11
Shabab Al Ahli	6	3	2	1	9	4	+5	11
Al Nasr	6	2	2	2	6	5	+1	8
Al Jazira	6	2	1	3	5	10	−5	7 (Note: Al Jazira are ahead of Khor Fakkan and Al Dhafra on head-to-head points: Al Jazira 6, Khor Fakkan 1, Al Dhafra 1.)
Khor Fakkan	6	1	4	1	5	5	0	7
Al Dhafra	6	2	1	3	5	7	−2	7
Kalba	6	1	2	3	5	9	−4	5

Source: https://www.scorespro.com/soccer/uae/league-cup/results/

=== Group B ===
Team	Pld	W	D	L	GF	GA	GD	Pts
Al Wahda	6	3	2	1	11	7	+4	11
Fujairah	6	3	1	2	9	10	−1	10 (Note: Fujairah are ahead of Al Wasl on head-to-head points: Al Wasl 0–1 Fujairah.)
Al Wasl	6	3	1	2	12	11	+1	10
Sharjah	6	3	0	3	10	6	+4	9
Baniyas	6	2	2	2	10	9	+1	8
Hatta	6	2	1	3	7	11	−4	7
Ajman	6	0	3	3	7	14	−7	3

Updated to match(es) played on 26 December 2017. Source: http://uae.agleague.ae/en/stats/the-arabian-gulf-cup.html
Rules for classification: 1) points; 2) head-to-head points; 3) head-to-head goal difference; 4) head-to-head goals scored; 5) head-to-head away goals scored; 6) goal difference; 7) number of goals scored; 8) number of away goals scored; 9) fair play ranking 10) draw

== Group matches ==
All times are local (UTC+04:00)

=== Group A ===
22 August 2019 WEEK 1	Al Jazira	3–1	Khor Fakkan	Abu Dhabi
19:15	Faisal Al Matroushi 14'; Khalfan Mubarak 77'; Sultan Al Ghaferi 82'	Report	Pedro Júnior 38'	Stadium: Mohammed bin Zayed Stadium; Referee: Zayed Alawakli; Assistant referees: Talal Rashed Al Nuaimi; Fourth official: Mohamed Ali Hilal

23 August 2019 WEEK 1	Al Nasr	3–0	Kalba	Dubai
19:15	Brandley Kuwas 8'; Tozé 41'; Álvaro Negredo 73'	Report		Stadium: Al Maktoum Stadium; Referee: Sultan Mohamed; Assistant referees: Khamis Fayroz; Fourth official: Yasser Al Murshidi

23 August 2019 WEEK 1	Al Ain	2–2	Shabab Al Ahli	Al Ain
19:15	Kodjo 6' (pen.), 80' (pen.)	Report	Henrique Luvannor 64'; Ahmed Khalil 90+5' (pen.)	Stadium: Hazza bin Zayed Stadium

30 August 2019 WEEK 2	Kalba	2–3	Al Dhafra	Kalba
19:00	Balázs Dzsudzsák 35'; Peniel Mlapa 43'	Report	Diego Jardel 4'; João Pedro 19', 78'	Stadium: Ittihad Kalba Stadium; Referee: Khalid Al Mulla; Assistant referees: Ahmed Abdouli; Fourth official: Ahmed Alghis

31 August 2019 WEEK 2	Khor Fakkan	0–0	Al Nasr	Kalba
19:00		Report		Stadium: Ittihad Kalba Stadium; Referee: Abdulla Al Ajel Al Zaabi

31 August 2019 WEEK 2	Shabab Al Ahli	4–0	Al Jazira	Dubai
21:30	Henrique Luvannor 26'; Mohammed Jumaa 55'; Thulani Serero 58' (o.g.); Ahmed Jashak 65'	Report		Stadium: Rashid Stadium; Referee: Ahmed Eisa Mohamed; Assistant referees: Khamis Fayroz; Fourth official: Ahmed Mussabah Mubarak

6 September 2019 WEEK 3	Al Dhafra	0–0	Khor Fakkan	Madinat Zayed
19:30		Report		Stadium: Al Dhafra Stadium; Referee: Ahmed Hassan Hussain Bilal; Assistant referees: Mohamed Al Shehhi; Fourth official: Ali Kareem

6 September 2019 WEEK 3	Al Jazira	0–3	Al Ain	Abu Dhabi
21:15		Report	Amer Abdulrahman 39' (o.g.); Caio 48'; Jamal Ibrahim 90+4'	Stadium: Mohammed bin Zayed Stadium; Referee: Omar Mohamed Al Ali; Assistant referees: Yasser Al Murshidi; Fourth official: Mohamed Al Zarouni

7 September 2019 WEEK 3	Al Nasr	0–2	Shabab Al Ahli	Dubai
21:15		Report	Mohammed Jumaa 38', 63'	Stadium: Al Maktoum Stadium; Referee: Hamad Ali Yousef; Assistant referees: Juma Al Mukhaini; Fourth official: Zayed Al Awakli

11 October 2019 WEEK 4	Kalba	0–0	Khor Fakkan	Kalba
18:15		Report		Stadium: Ittihad Kalba Stadium; Referee: Abdullah Naji; Assistant referees: Khamis Fayroz; Fourth official: Naser Al Ali

11 October 2019 WEEK 4	Al Ain	3–1	Al Nasr	Al Ain
20:45	Jamal Ibrahim 13', 53'; Caio 45'	Report	Gabriel Valentini 86'	Stadium: Hazza bin Zayed Stadium; Referee: Ahmad Salem Khalfan; Assistant referees: Mohamed Al Shehhi; Fourth official: Mohammed Ali Mubarak Al Shabibi

12 October 2019 WEEK 4	Shabab Al Ahli	0–2	Al Dhafra	Dubai
18:15		Report	Mohammed Saif 32'; João Pedro 88'	Stadium: Rashid Stadium; Referee: Ahmed Hassan Hussain Bilal; Assistant referees: Talal Rashed Al Nuaimi; Fourth official: Sakr Al Zaaby

15 November 2019 WEEK 5	Kalba	0–1	Shabab Al Ahli	Kalba
17:15		Report	Henrique Luvannor 81'	Stadium: Ittihad Kalba Stadium; Referee: Mohammed Abdulla Al Ali; Assistant referees: Khamis Fayroz; Fourth official: Ahmed Al Naqbi

15 November 2019 WEEK 5	Al Nasr	0–0	Al Jazira	Dubai
19:30		Report		Stadium: Al Maktoum Stadium; Referee: Naser Al Ali; Assistant referees: Ahmed Abdouli; Fourth official: Sakr Al Zaabi

16 November 2019 WEEK 5	Al Dhafra	0–2	Al Ain	Madinat Zayed
17:00		Report	Caio 32'; Masoud Sulaiman 86' (o.g.)	Stadium: Al Dhafra Stadium; Referee: Yaqoub Al Hammadi; Assistant referees: Ahmed Al Hossani; Fourth official: Ahmed Khudabkhsh

22 November 2019 WEEK 6	Shabab Al Ahli	0–0	Khor Fakkan	Dubai
17:00		Report		Stadium: Rashid Stadium; Referee: Khalid Al Mulla; Assistant referees: Juma Al Mukhaini; Fourth official: Abdulla Eshtairy

22 November 2019 WEEK 6	Al Jazira	1–0	Al Dhafra	Abu Dhabi
17:00	Miloš Kosanović 90+4' (pen.)	Report		Stadium: Mohammed bin Zayed Stadium; Referee: Yahya Al Mulla; Assistant referees: Talal Rashed Al Nuaimi; Fourth official: Mohammed Abdulla Al Ali

23 November 2019 WEEK 6	Al Ain	1–1	Kalba	Al Ain
17:00	Jamal Ibrahim 39'	Report	Majed Rashed 45+4'	Stadium: Sheikh Khalifa International Stadium; Referee: Omar Mohamed Al Ali; Assistant referees: Mohammed Ghulaita Al Shehhi; Fourth official: Ahmed Mussabah Mubarak

28 November 2019 WEEK 7	Khor Fakkan	4–2	Al Ain	Kalba
17:00	Bismark 41' (pen.), 88'; Dodô 48'; Mohamed Malallah 55'	Report	Omar Yaisien 15'; Mohamed Abdulrahman 36'	Stadium: Ittihad Kalba Stadium; Referee: Yahya Al Mulla; Assistant referees: Mohamed Ali Hilal; Fourth official: Sakr Al Zaaby

30 November 2019 WEEK 7	Kalba	2–1	Al Jazira	Kalba
17:00	Peniel Mlapa 72', 89'	Report	Bruno 24'	Stadium: Ittihad Kalba Stadium; Referee: Sultan Mohamed; Assistant referees: Yasser Al Murshidi; Fourth official: Abdulla Eshtairy

30 November 2019 WEEK 7	Al Dhafra	0–2	Al Nasr	Madinat Zayed
17:00		Report	Álvaro Negredo 23'; Gláuber 83'	Stadium: Al Dhafra Stadium; Referee: Hamad Ali Yousef; Assistant referees: Yousef Al Qiwani; Fourth official: Easa Khalifa Al Hajri

=== Group B ===
22 August 2019 WEEK 1	Ajman	0–0	Hatta	Ajman
19:15		Report		Stadium: Ajman Stadium; Referee: Mohammed Abdulla Alali; Assistant referees: Kais Al Khadem; Fourth official: Khalid Al Mulla

22 August 2019 WEEK 1	Baniyas	2–0	Sharjah	Abu Dhabi
19:15	Pedro Conde 62' (pen.), 90+2'	Report		Stadium: Baniyas Stadium; Referee: Naser Al Ali; Assistant referees: Mohamed Al Shehhi; Fourth official: Mohamed Al Obeidly

23 August 2019 WEEK 1	Al Wahda	3–1	Fujairah	Abu Dhabi
19:15	Abdulla Anwar 40', 48'; Yahya Alghassani 85'	Report	Salim Al Rawahi 78'	Stadium: Al Nahyan Stadium; Referee: Khalid Najem; Assistant referees: Mohamed Al Shehhi; Fourth official: Khalid Al Mulla

26 August 2019 WEEK 2	Hatta	3–4	Al Wasl	Hatta
19:15	Cristian López 6', 86' (pen.); Abdullah Kazim 16'	Report	Lima 39' (pen.), 90+2'; Welliton 54'; Abdulla Jasem Ali 74'	Stadium: Hamdan Bin Rashid Stadium; Referee: Easa Khalifa Al Hajeri; Assistant referees: Salah Salim Hammadi; Fourth official: Abdulla Mohamed Eshtairy

30 August 2019 WEEK 2	Fujairah	2–2	Ajman	Fujairah
21:30	Fernando Gabriel 14'; Jhonnattann 29'	Report	Abdullah Al-Junaibi 36' (o.g.); Owusu 48'	Stadium: Fujairah Stadium; Referee: Ahmad Salem Khalfan; Assistant referees: Mohamed Al Shehhi; Fourth official: Saeed Al Mansoori

31 August 2019 WEEK 2	Sharjah	1–3	Al Wahda	Sharjah
19:00	Mohammed Khalfan 88'	Report	Abdulla Anwar 15', 42', 54'	Stadium: Sharjah Stadium; Referee: Yahya Al Mulla

6 September 2019 WEEK 3	Al Wasl	0–1	Fujairah	Dubai
19:00		Report	Salem Al-Rawahi 69'	Stadium: Zabeel Stadium; Referee: Sultan Mohamed; Assistant referees: Talal Rashed Al Nuaimi; Fourth official: Ahmed Khudabkhsh

7 September 2019 WEEK 3	Ajman	0–5	Sharjah	Ajman
19:00		Report	Ricardo Gomes 35', 61', 75'; Ryan Mendes 35'; Igor Coronado 55'	Stadium: Ajman Stadium; Referee: Abdulla Ashtyri; Assistant referees: Mohamed Ali Hilal; Fourth official: Ahmed Mussabah Mubarak

7 September 2019 WEEK 3	Al Wahda	1–1	Baniyas	Madinat Zayed
19:00	Yahya Ghassani 44' (pen.)	Report	Pedro Conde 49'	Stadium: Al Dhafra Stadium; Referee: Mohamed Al Obeidly; Assistant referees: Hassan Ali Al Hammadi; Fourth official: Ahmad Salem Khalfan

11 October 2019 WEEK 4	Baniyas	3–3	Ajman	Abu Dhabi
18:15	Ayanda Patosi 16'; Pedro Conde 30', 62'	Report	William Owusu 4' (pen.); Vander 79'; Ibrahim 85'	Stadium: Baniyas Stadium; Referee: Ahmed Hasan Al Hammadi; Assistant referees: Saeed Al-Marzooqi; Fourth official: Ahmed Mussabah Mubarak

12 October 2019 WEEK 4	Fujairah	1–0	Hatta	Fujairah
18:15	Jhonnattann 47'	Report		Stadium: Fujairah Stadium; Referee: Mohamed Al Zarouni; Assistant referees: Kais Al Khadem; Fourth official: Easa Khalifa Al Hajri

12 October 2019 WEEK 4	Sharjah	4–0	Al Wasl	Sharjah
20:45	Tareq Al-Khodaim 18'; Hamdan Al-Mansouri 62'; Omar Jumaa 64'; Rafael Dos Santos 90+5'	Report		Stadium: Sharjah Stadium; Referee: Yaqoub Al Hammadi; Assistant referees: Ahmed Al Hossani; Fourth official: Zayed Al Awakli

15 November 2019 WEEK 5	Ajman	0–1	Al Wahda	Ajman
17:00		Report	Carlitos 48'	Stadium: Ajman Stadium; Referee: Sultan Mohammed; Assistant referees: Mohamed Al Obeidly; Fourth official: Ahmed Alghis

16 November 2019 WEEK 5	Hatta	1–0	Sharjah	Hatta
17:00	Salem Jassim 17'	Report		Stadium: Hamdan Bin Rashid Stadium; Referee: Abdulla Al Ajel Al Zaabi; Assistant referees: Yousef Al Qiwani; Fourth official: Ahmed Mussabah Mubarak

16 November 2019 WEEK 5	Al Wasl	2–0	Baniyas	Dubai
19:30	Lima 67', 72'	Report		Stadium: Zabeel Stadium; Referee: Hamad Ali Yousef; Assistant referees: Talal Rashed Al Nuaimi; Fourth official: Mohammed Ali Mubarak Al Shabibi

22 November 2019 WEEK 6	Al Wahda	1–1	Al Wasl	Abu Dhabi
19:30	Abdulla Anwar 12'	Report	Yousef Ahmed 6'	Stadium: Al Nahyan Stadium; Referee: Ahmed Eisa Mohamed; Assistant referees: Sabet Obaid Suroor; Fourth official: Naser Al Ali

23 November 2019 WEEK 6	Baniyas	4–0	Hatta	Abu Dhabi
17:00	Pedro Conde 24', 48'; Mohhammed Al-Menhali 50'; Mohammed Al-Hammadi 85'	Report		Stadium: Baniyas Stadium; Referee: Mohomed Obaid Khadim; Assistant referees: Ali Mohamed Al Nuaimi; Fourth official: Ahmad Al Naqbi

23 November 2019 WEEK 6	Sharjah	5–1	Fujairah	Sharjah
19:30	Mohammed Khalfan 19', 67', 77'; Igor Coronado 45'; Resemde 77'	Report	Jhonnattan 55'	Stadium: Sharjah Stadium; Referee: Adel Al Naqbi; Assistant referees: Jasem Abdulla Al Ali; Fourth official: Zayed Al Awakli

28 November 2019 WEEK 7	Hatta	3–2	Al Wahda	Hatta
17:00	Rashed Mubarak 41'; Cristian López 86', 90+3'	Report	Carlitos 52' (pen.); Rashed Abdullah 70'	Stadium: Hamdan Bin Rashid Stadium; Referee: Abdullah Naji; Assistant referees: Mawraan Abdulrahman; Fourth official: Ahmed Alghis

28 November 2019 WEEK 7	Fujairah	3–0; Awarded	Baniyas	Fujairah
19:30	William Jebor 86'	Report	Sultan Al-Shamsi 11', 44'; Khaled Al-Hashemi 80'	Stadium: Fujairah Stadium; Referee: Ahmad Salem Khalfan; Assistant referees: Abdulla Al-Marzooqi; Fourth official: Amer Aldhubiea

30 November 2019 WEEK 7	Al Wasl	3–2	Ajman	Dubai
19:30	Lima 16', 42', 78'	Report	Hassan Zahran 7'; William Owusu 56'	Stadium: Zabeel Stadium; Referee: Abdulla Ali Al Ajel Al Zaabi; Assistant referees: Mohammed Ghulaita Al Shehhi; Fourth official: Ahmed Hasan Al Hammadi

== Knockout stage ==
=== Quarter-finals ===
6 December 2019 Quarter-finals	Al Ain	2–1	Sharjah	Al Ain
17:00	Kodjo Laba 28'; Mohamed Abdulrahman 87'	Report	Igor Coronado 8' (pen.)	Stadium: Hazza bin Zayed Stadium; Referee: Hamad Ali Yousef; Assistant referees: Sabet Obaid Suroor; Fourth official: Abdulla Mohamed Rashid Ashtyri

6 December 2019 Quarter-finals	Fujairah	0–1	Al Nasr	Fujairah
17:00		Report	Habib Al Fardan 44'	Stadium: Fujairah Stadium; Referee: Yahya Al Mulla; Assistant referees: Ali Mohamed Al Nuaimi; Fourth official: Naser Al Ali

6 December 2019 Quarter-finals	Al Wahda	0–4	Al Jazira	Abu Dhabi
19:30		Report	Omar Abdulrahman 30'; Miloš Kosanović 33'; Keno 34'; Khalfan Mubarak 85'	Stadium: Al Nahyan Stadium; Referee: Ammar Ali Abdulla Jumaa Al Junaibi; Assistant referees: Ahmed Saeed Ahmed Al Rashedi; Fourth official: Ahmed Hasan Al Hammadi

6 December 2019 Quarter-finals	Shabab Al Ahli	5–1	Al Wasl	Dubai
19:30	Mohammed Marzooq 19'; Leonardo 62'; Cartabia 83'; Henrique Luvannor 88'; Ahmed Khalil 90+3'	Report	Abdullah Jassem 24'	Stadium: Rashid Stadium; Referee: Adel Al Naqbi; Assistant referees: Jasem Abdulla Al Ali; Fourth official: Ahmed Hassan Hussain Bilal

=== Semi-finals ===
9 January 2020 Semi-finals	Al Jazira	2–2 (2–4 p)	Shabab Al Ahli	Abu Dhabi
17:15	Omar Abdulrahman 58'; Yousif Jaber 75' (o.g.)	Report	Mohammed Marzooq 29'; Federico Cartabia 78' (pen.)	Stadium: Mohammed bin Zayed Stadium; Referee: Hamad Ali Yousef; Assistant referees: Ali Mohamed Al Nuaimi; Fourth official: Naser Al Ali
	Penalties
	Ali Mabkhout (penalty scored); Omar Abdulrahman (penalty missed); Keno (penalty scored); Musallem Fayez (penalty missed)		(penalty scored) Ahmed Khalil; (penalty scored) Federico Cartabia; (penalty scored) Yousif Jaber; (penalty scored) Davide Mariani

9 January 2020 Semi-finals	Al Ain	1–1 (1–4 p)	Al Nasr	Al Ain
19:45	Mahmoud Khamees 26' (o.g.)	Report	Tozé 82'	Stadium: Hazza bin Zayed Stadium; Referee: Adel Al Naqbi; Assistant referees: Jasem Abdulla Al Ali; Fourth official: Abdulla Mohamed Rashid Ashtyri
	Penalties
	Jamal Ibrahim (penalty missed); Caio (penalty missed); Kodjo Fo-Doh Laba (penalty scored)		(penalty scored) Tozé; (penalty scored) Álvaro Negredo; (penalty scored) Brandley Kuwas; (penalty scored) Tareq Ahmed

=== Final ===
17 January 2020
20:00

Al Nasr	2–1	Shabab Al Ahli
Negredo 1'; Tozé 50'; Abdullah (yellow card) 72'; Ayed (yellow card) 90+5'	Report	Jaber 13'; Al-Naqbi (yellow card) 85'

Zabeel Stadium, Dubai
Referee: Sultan Mohamed

Al Nasr	Shabab Al Ahli

image
