= 2023–24 Újpest FC season =

Újpest
2023–24 season
- Owner: Roderick Duchâtelet (until 31 March); MOL Group (from 31 March)
- Manager: Nebojša Vignjević (until 8 February); Géza Mészöly (from 8 February)
- Stadium: Szusza Ferenc Stadion
- Nemzeti Bajnokság I: 10th
- Magyar Kupa: Round of 16
- Top goalscorer: League: Matija Ljujić (10); All: Peter Ambrose; Matija Ljujić (10 each)
- Highest home attendance: 11,202 v Ferencváros (25 February 2024, Nemzeti Bajnokság I)
- Lowest home attendance: 2,389 v Paks (29 February 2024, Magyar Kupa)
- Average home league attendance: 5,059
- Biggest win: 7–0 v Diósgyőr (Home, 4 May 2024, Nemzeti Bajnokság I)
- Biggest defeat: 0–5 v Ferencváros (Home, 25 February 2024, Nemzeti Bajnokság I)
Home colours	Away colours	Third colours

The 2023–24 season was Újpest Football Club's 119th competitive season, 113th consecutive season in the Nemzeti Bajnokság I and 122nd year in existence as a football club. In addition to the domestic league, Újpest participated in that season's editions of the Magyar Kupa.

Nebojša Vignjević has been in charge since his return in March 2023, and was fired on 8 February 2024 after the club's change of ownership by MOL Group was announced. He was succeeded by Géza Mészöly, who was last acting as caretaker manager at Haladás in September 2022. He was appointed for the third time after managing Újpest between 2004–2006 and 2010–2011.

MOL Group became the new owner of Újpest on 31 March 2024. Roderick Duchâtelet had owned the club since autumn 2011 and under his ownership they achieved three Magyar Kupa, one Szuperkupa and one third place in the domestic league.

== Squad ==
Squad at end of season

Note: Flags indicate national team as defined under FIFA eligibility rules; some limited exceptions apply. Players may hold more than one non-FIFA nationality.

No.	Pos.	Nation	Player
1	GK	HUN	Gellért Genzler
2	DF	ALB	Albi Doka
3	DF	HUN	Csanád Fehér
5	DF	GEO	Davit Kobouri
6	MF	GER	Luca Mack
7	MF	HUN	Krisztián Simon
8	MF	DOM	Heinz Mörschel
10	MF	HUN	Mátyás Tajti
11	MF	HUN	Tamás Kiss
17	FW	ROU	George Ganea
18	DF	HUN	András Huszti (loaned from Zalaegerszeg)
19	MF	CIV	Aboubakar Keita
21	MF	HUN	György Varga
22	DF	HUN	Krisztián Tamás

No.	Pos.	Nation	Player
23	GK	HUN	Dávid Banai
26	MF	HUN	Bálint Geiger
27	FW	NGA	Franklin Sasere
28	MF	SRB	Ognjen Radošević
29	MF	NGA	Vincent Onovo
31	GK	HUN	Zsombor Molnár
32	FW	NGA	Peter Ambrose
42	DF	GRE	Georgios Antzoulas
45	MF	MKD	Stefan Jevtoski
49	DF	SRB	Branko Pauljević
68	DF	BIH	Dženan Bureković
77	FW	HUN	Kevin Csoboth
88	MF	SRB	Matija Ljujić

== Transfers ==
=== Transfers in ===
Transfer window	Pos.	No.	Player	From
Summer	FW	—	(Hungary) Domonkos Tamási	Youth team
Summer	MF	11	(Hungary) Tamás Kiss	Free agent (Note: Previous club Puskás Akadémia.)
Summer	FW	17	(Romania) George Ganea	Free agent (Note: Previous club FC U Craiova.)
Summer	DF	22	(Hungary) Krisztián Tamás	Free agent (Note: Previous club Honvéd.)
Summer	MF	26	(Hungary) Bálint Geiger	Youth team
Summer	FW	27	(Nigeria) Franklin Sasere	(Romania) Vaduz
Summer	FW	57	(Hungary) Ákos Tóth	Youth team
Winter	GK	1	(Hungary) Gellért Genzler	Youth team
Winter	DF	2	(Albania) Albi Doka	(Albania) Tirana
Winter	DF	5	(Georgia (country)) Davit Kobouri	(Georgia (country)) Dinamo Tbilisi
Winter	MF	19	(Ivory Coast) Aboubakar Keita	Free agent (Note: Previous club AIK.)

=== Transfers out ===
Transfer window	Pos.	No.	Player	To
Summer	GK	1	(Serbia) Filip Pajović	Released
Summer	DF	4	(Mali) Abdoulaye Diaby	(Switzerland) FC St. Gallen
Summer	MF	5	(Cameroon) Petrus Boumal	Released (Note: Joined Al Bataeh.)
Summer	DF	11	(Serbia) Nemanja Antonov	Released (Note: Joined MTK.)
Summer	FW	82	(Italy) Giuseppe Borello	Released (Note: Joined Monopoli.)
Summer	FW	91	(Serbia) Ognjen Mudrinski	Released
Winter	DF	2	(Kosovo) Lirim Kastrati	(Poland) Widzew Łódź
Winter	GK	13	(Serbia) Đorđe Nikolić	(Turkey) Sivasspor
Winter	DF	20	(Estonia) Märten Kuusk	(Poland) GKS Katowice
Winter	FW	30	(Estonia) Oliver Jürgens	(Slovakia) DAC Dunajská Streda
Winter	DF	33	(Serbia) Miloš Kosanović	Released (Note: Joined Ajman.)

=== Loans in ===
Transfer window	Pos.	No.	Player	From	End date
Winter	DF	18	(Hungary) András Huszti	Zalaegerszeg	End of season

=== Loans out ===
Transfer window	Pos.	No.	Player	To	End date
Summer	MF	18	(Hungary) Bálint Szabó	(Romania) Csíkszereda Miercurea Ciuc	Middle of season
Winter	MF	18	(Hungary) Bálint Szabó	Kozármisleny	End of season

== Competitions ==
=== Overview ===
Competition	First match	Last match	Starting round	Final position	Record							
Competition	First match	Last match	Starting round	Final position	Pld	W	D	L	GF	GA	GD	Win %
Nemzeti Bajnokság I	29 July 2023	19 May 2024	Matchday 1	10th	33	11	4	18	45	67	−22	33.33
Magyar Kupa	16 September 2023	29 February 2024	Round of 64	Round of 16	3	2	0	1	6	3	+3	66.67
Total					36	13	4	19	51	70	−19	36.11

Source: Competitions

=== Nemzeti Bajnokság I ===
==== League table ====
Pos	Team	Pld	W	D	L	GF	GA	GD	Pts	Qualification or relegation
8	MTK	33	12	8	13	43	62	−19	44	
9	Zalaegerszeg	33	12	7	14	54	60	−6	43	
10	Újpest	33	11	4	18	45	67	−22	37	
11	Kisvárda (R)	33	9	4	20	40	55	−15	31	Relegation to the Nemzeti Bajnokság II
12	Mezőkövesd (R)	33	5	6	22	31	63	−32	21	Relegation to the Nemzeti Bajnokság II

Source: Hungarian Football Federation (in Hungarian), Soccerway
Rules for classification: 1) Points; 2) Matches won; 3) Goal difference; 4) Goals scored; 5) Head-to-head points; 6) Head-to-head goal difference; 7) Fair play ranking; 8) Drawing of lots.
(R) Relegated

==== Results summary ====
Overall								Home						Away					
Pld	W	D	L	GF	GA	GD	Pts	W	D	L	GF	GA	GD	W	D	L	GF	GA	GD
33	11	4	18	45	67	−22	37	7	2	8	31	33	−2	4	2	10	14	34	−20

Source: Hungarian Football Federation

==== Results by round ====
Round	1	2	3	4	5	6	7	8	9	10	11	12	13	14	15	16	17	18	19	20	21	22	23	24	25	26	27	28	29	30	31	32	33
Ground	H	A	H	A	H	H	H	A	H	H	A	A	H	A	H	A	A	A	H	A	A	H	H	A	H	A	H	A	H	A	H	H	A
Result	W	D	D	L	W	W	L	W	W	W	L	L	L	L	L	D	L	L	L	W	L	L	W	W	D	W	L	L	L	L	W	L	L
Position	3	3	6	8	8	6	7	5	3	3	3	3	7	8	9	8	9	9	10	9	10	10	10	9	9	9	10	10	10	10	10	10	10
Points	3	4	5	5	8	11	11	14	17	20	20	20	20	20	20	21	21	21	21	24	24	24	27	30	31	34	34	34	34	34	37	37	37

Source: Matches
A = Away; H = Home; W = Win; D = Draw; L = Loss

==== Matches ====
29 July 2023 1	Újpest	2–1	Fehérvár	Budapest
20:15 CEST (UTC+2)	Ljujić 12', (yellow card) 35'; Antzoulas (yellow card) 15'; Csoboth (red card) 34'; Mack 42', (yellow card) 77'; Vignjević (manager) (yellow card) 78'; Pauljević (yellow card) 82'	Report	Katona 47', (yellow card) 54'; Schön (yellow card) 90+7'	Stadium: Szusza Ferenc Stadion; Attendance: 6,085; Referee: Ferenc Karakó

4 August 2023 2	Puskás Akadémia	3–3	Újpest	Felcsút
20:00 CEST (UTC+2)	Colley 20', 37', (yellow card) 77'; Levi 40'; Szolnoki (yellow card) 75'; Ormonde-Ottewill (yellow card) 78'	Report	Ljujić 32' (pen.), 46', 63'; Tamás (yellow card) 54'	Stadium: Pancho Aréna; Attendance: 3,700; Referee: Csaba Pintér

12 August 2023 3	Újpest	1–1	Mezőkövesd	Budapest
18:00 CEST (UTC+2)	Simon 88'	Report	Filip (yellow card) 50'; Beriashvili (yellow card) 79'; Lehoczky 90+2'	Stadium: Szusza Ferenc Stadion; Attendance: 5,115; Referee: Balázs Berke

19 August 2023 4	Paks	3–0	Újpest	Paks
20:00 CEST (UTC+2)	Ljujić 24' (o.g.); B. Szabó 25'; J. Szabó (red card) 40'; Kinyik (yellow card) 44'; Windecker (yellow card) 49'; Bőle 79'	Report	Hall (red card) 40'; Antzoulas (yellow card) 73'	Stadium: Fehérvári úti Stadion; Attendance: 3,076; Referee: József Erdős

26 August 2023 5	Újpest	2–1	Zalaegerszeg	Budapest
20:00 CEST (UTC+2)	Csoboth 2'; Kastrati (yellow card) 30'; Tóth (yellow card) 33'; Ambrose 61'; Ljujić (yellow card) 84'	Report	B. Kovács (yellow card) 15'; Szendrei (yellow card) 35'; Mim 60'; Bedi (yellow card) 81'	Stadium: Szusza Ferenc Stadion; Attendance: 4,003; Referee: Ádám Farkas

1 September 2023 6	Újpest	3–2	Kisvárda	Budapest
20:00 CEST (UTC+2)	Ljujić 28'; Ambrose (yellow card) 42', (goal) 53'; Ganea (yellow card) 69'; Mörschel 81'; Mack (yellow card) 90+13'	Report	Mešanović 6'; Cipetić (yellow card) 23'; Ötvös (yellow card) 34'; Kovačić (yellow card) 55'; Jovičić (yellow card) 56', (goal) 72'; Balogh (yellow card) 90+13'	Stadium: Szusza Ferenc Stadion; Attendance: 3,980; Referee: Sándor Andó-Szabó

23 September 2023 7	Újpest	0–2	MTK	Budapest
19:30 CEST (UTC+2)	Ganea (yellow card) 87'	Report	Bognár 25'; Végh (yellow card) 49'; Kata (yellow card) 50'; Németh 72'	Stadium: Szusza Ferenc Stadion; Attendance: 4,561; Referee: Márton Rúsz

30 September 2023 8	Debrecen	1–2	Újpest	Debrecen
19:30 CEST (UTC+2)	Lagator (red card) 13'; Ferenczi (yellow card) 21'; Kyziridis (yellow card) 45+1'; Blagojević (manager) (yellow card) 45+2'; Kusnyír 74'; Bódi (yellow card) 84'	Report	Mack (yellow card) 53'; Mörschel 80', 88'; Ganea (yellow card) 90+2'	Stadium: Nagyerdei Stadion; Attendance: 6,645; Referee: Gergő Bogár

7 October 2023 9	Újpest	2–0	Diósgyőr	Budapest
16:15 CEST (UTC+2)	Onovo 51'; Ambrose 66'; Banai (yellow card) 80'; Pauljević (yellow card) 82'	Report	Gera (yellow card) 62'	Stadium: Szusza Ferenc Stadion; Attendance: 7,188; Referee: Ferenc Karakó

21 October 2023 10	Újpest	5–3	Kecskemét	Budapest
17:00 CEST (UTC+2)	Csoboth 5', 52'; Tamás 32'; Tajti 48'; Onovo 51', (yellow card) 52'; G. Varga (yellow card) 85'	Report	Szalai 57'; Szuhodovszki 60'; Vágó 85'	Stadium: Szusza Ferenc Stadion; Attendance: 5,732; Referee: Tamás Bognár

29 October 2023 11	Ferencváros	3–0	Újpest	Budapest
18:00 CET (UTC+1)	Lisztes (yellow card) 21'; Pešić 28'; Abena 70'; Abu Fani 74'	Report	Hall (yellow card) 53'; Kosanović (yellow card) 82'	Stadium: Groupama Arena; Attendance: 20,357; Referee: Ferenc Karakó

4 November 2023 12	Fehérvár	2–1	Újpest	Székesfehérvár
18:00 CET (UTC+1)	Schön (yellow card) 38'; Kastrati 80', (yellow card) 85'; Christensen (yellow card) 81'; Karamoko 89'	Report	Ambrose 8', (yellow card) 49'; Kosanović (yellow card) 32'; Tajti (yellow card) 38'	Stadium: Sóstói Stadion; Attendance: 4,990; Referee: Sándor Andó-Szabó

11 November 2023 13	Újpest	1–2	Puskás Akadémia	Budapest
19:30 CET (UTC+1)	Ambrose 15'	Report	Favorov 19', 90'; Maceiras (yellow card) 35'; Golla (yellow card) 57'	Stadium: Szusza Ferenc Stadion; Attendance: 4,187; Referee: István Vad

25 November 2023 14	Mezőkövesd	4–0	Újpest	Mezőkövesd
19:30 CET (UTC+1)	Dražić 16', 90+3'; Kállai (yellow card) 23'; G. Molnár 39'; Vayda (yellow card) 48'; Gomis (yellow card) 70'; Cseke 90'	Report	Sasere (yellow card) 83'	Stadium: Városi Stadion; Attendance: 1,896; Referee: Marcell Derdák

3 December 2023 15	Újpest	1–2	Paks	Budapest
12:45 CET (UTC+1)	Varga 24'; Mörschel (yellow card) 55'; Kastrati (yellow card) 78'; Tajti (yellow card) 90+1'	Report	Könyves 23' (pen.); Lenzsér (yellow card) 37'; Hahn 64'	Stadium: Szusza Ferenc Stadion; Attendance: 3,078; Referee: Balázs Berke

9 December 2023 16	Zalaegerszeg	1–1	Újpest	Zalaegerszeg
15:45 CET (UTC+1)	Mim (yellow card) 37'; Medgyes 86'	Report	Ambrose 50'; Jevtoski (yellow card) 80'; Kiss (yellow card) 83'; Csoboth (yellow card) 90'	Stadium: ZTE Arena; Attendance: 1,755; Referee: Gergő Bogár

16 December 2023 17	Kisvárda	4–0	Újpest	Kisvárda
15:00 CET (UTC+1)	Ilievski 34', 53'; Navrátil 46'; Széles (yellow card) 48'; Jovičić (yellow card) 57'; Nikolov 67'	Report	Csoboth (yellow card) 27'; Mack (yellow card) 49'	Stadium: Várkerti Stadion; Attendance: 1,815; Referee: Márton Rúsz

2 February 2024 18	MTK	3–0	Újpest	Budapest
20:00 CET (UTC+1)	Hey 20'; Jurina 36'; Németh (yellow card) 54'; Kocsis 58'	Report	Hall (yellow card) 15'; Mörschel (yellow card) 54'; Radošević (yellow card) 85'	Stadium: Hidegkuti Nándor Stadion; Attendance: 3,525; Referee: József Erdős

6 February 2024 19	Újpest	1–2	Debrecen	Budapest
17:45 CET (UTC+1)	Jevtoski (red card) 59'; Mack (yellow card) 67'; Mörschel 90+11' (pen.)	Report	Lagator (yellow card) 67'; Domingues 78', 90+4'	Stadium: Szusza Ferenc Stadion; Attendance: 2,610; Referee: Csaba Pintér

11 February 2024 20	Diósgyőr	1–2	Újpest	Miskolc
14:45 CET (UTC+1)	Jurek (yellow card) 44'; Edomwonyi 50'; Kampetsis (yellow card) 90+1'	Report	Radošević 17'; Mörschel (yellow card) 53', (goal) 73'; Pauljević (yellow card) 77'	Stadium: Diósgyőri Stadion; Attendance: 7,581; Referee: Péter Antal

17 February 2024 21	Kecskemét	1–0	Újpest	Kecskemét
13:00 CET (UTC+1)	Lukács 3'; A. Szabó (yellow card) 41'; Vágó (yellow card) 65'; Zeke (yellow card) 82'	Report	Mörschel (yellow card) 16'; Pauljević (yellow card) 35'; Banai (yellow card) 78'; Mészöly (manager) (yellow card) 82'; Ljujić (yellow card) 90+3'	Stadium: Széktói Stadion; Attendance: 4,368; Referee: Ferenc Karakó

25 February 2024 22	Újpest	0–5	Ferencváros	Budapest
17:30 CET (UTC+1)		Report	B. Varga 37', 45'; Lončar 65', (yellow card) 75'; Pešić 75', 83'; Marquinhos (yellow card) 90+3'	Stadium: Szusza Ferenc Stadion; Attendance: 11,202; Referee: Balázs Berke

3 March 2024 23	Újpest	2–0	Fehérvár	Budapest
19:00 CET (UTC+1)	Kobouri (yellow card) 65'; Tajti 76'; Ambrose 77'	Report	Schön (yellow card) 81'; Gergényi (yellow card) 89'; Pető (yellow card) 90+3'	Stadium: Szusza Ferenc Stadion; Attendance: 3,201; Referee: Gergő Bogár

8 March 2024 24	Puskás Akadémia	0–2	Újpest	Felcsút
20:00 CET (UTC+1)	Corbu (yellow card) 51'; Batik (yellow card) 70'	Report	Ambrose 10'; Keita (yellow card) 31'; Radošević (yellow card) 71'; Antzoulas 74'	Stadium: Pancho Aréna; Attendance: 2,300; Referee: Ferenc Karakó

16 March 2024 25	Újpest	2–2	Mezőkövesd	Budapest
13:00 CET (UTC+1)	Mack (yellow card) 53'; Mörschel (yellow card) 72'; Ljujić 85' (pen.); Csoboth 86'	Report	Cseke 50'; Kojnok (yellow card) 84'; Karnitsky 90+3'	Stadium: Szusza Ferenc Stadion; Attendance: 4,383; Referee: Sándor Andó-Szabó

31 March 2024 26	Paks	1–2	Újpest	Paks
15:30 CEST (UTC+2)	Könyves 47', (yellow card) 70'; Kovács (yellow card) 74'; Kinyik (yellow card) 77'	Report	Ljujić (yellow card) 38', (goal) 45+1', 75' (pen.); Mack (yellow card) 49'	Stadium: Fehérvári úti Stadion; Attendance: 4,108; Referee: Balázs Berke

5 April 2024 27	Újpest	1–5	Zalaegerszeg	Budapest
20:00 CEST (UTC+2)	Huszti 23'; Keita (red card) 59'	Report	Croizet 31', 66'; Mim (yellow card) 40'; Mance 53', 61' (pen.); Szendrei (yellow card) 64'; Németh 81'	Stadium: Szusza Ferenc Stadion; Attendance: 6,321; Referee: Márton Rúsz

13 April 2024 28	Kisvárda	4–1	Újpest	Kisvárda
14:30 CEST (UTC+2)	Navrátil 8'; Mešanović 17'; M. Kovács (yellow card) 29'; Matić 39', (yellow card) 69'; Makowski 54'	Report	Ljujić 30' (pen.); Huszti (yellow card) 46'; Radošević (yellow card) 53'; Mörschel (yellow card) 89'	Stadium: Várkerti Stadion; Attendance: 2,450; Referee: Csaba Pintér

21 April 2024 29	Újpest	1–2	MTK	Budapest
18:30 CEST (UTC+2)	Csoboth 20'; Ljujić (yellow card) 35'; Huszti (yellow card) 57'; Kobouri (yellow card) 90+3'	Report	Kádár (yellow card) 64'; Jurina 79', 90+7', (yellow card) 90+7'; P. Kovács I (yellow card) 90+2'	Stadium: Szusza Ferenc Stadion; Attendance: 3,276; Referee: Péter Antal

27 April 2024 30	Debrecen	1–0	Újpest	Debrecen
19:30 CEST (UTC+2)	Szécsi (yellow card) 23'; Lagator (yellow card) 86'; Ojediran 88'	Report	Kobouri (yellow card) 43'; Tamás (red card) 48'	Stadium: Nagyerdei Stadion; Attendance: 6,592; Referee: Balázs Berke

4 May 2024 31	Újpest	7–0	Diósgyőr	Budapest
19:15 CEST (UTC+2)	Radošević 6'; Keita 10'; Mörschel 30' (pen.); Ljujić 45'; Csoboth 59', 61'; Ambrose 72'	Report	Lund (yellow card) 33'; Bokros (yellow card) 48'	Stadium: Szusza Ferenc Stadion; Attendance: 5,833; Referee: Mihály Káprály

10 May 2024 32	Újpest	0–3	Kecskemét	Budapest
20:15 CEST (UTC+2)	Keita (yellow card) 53'	Report	Pálinkás 27', 64'; Horváth 59', (yellow card) 86'	Stadium: Szusza Ferenc Stadion; Attendance: 5,255; Referee: István Vad

19 May 2024 33	Ferencváros	2–0	Újpest	Budapest
20:15 CEST (UTC+2)	Ben Romdhane (yellow card) 25'; Marquinhos 38', (yellow card) 39'; Lisztes 76' (pen.)	Report	Ambrose (yellow card) 29'; Tajti (yellow card) 35'	Stadium: Groupama Arena; Attendance: 18,767; Referee: József Erdős

=== Magyar Kupa ===
16 September 2023 Round of 64	Pécs	1–3	Újpest	Pécs
16:45 CEST (UTC+2)	Weitner (manager) (yellow card) 12'; Szabó 38' (pen.); Krausz (yellow card) 74'	Report	Ambrose 5'; Kiss (yellow card) 7'; Fehér 31'; Onovo 52'	Stadium: Stadion PMFC; Attendance: 5,500; Referee: Dr Bence Csonka

1 November 2023 Round of 32	Tatabánya	0–2	Újpest	Tatabánya
17:00 CEST (UTC+2)	Molnár (yellow card) 77'; Árvai (yellow card) 79'	Report	Jürgens 54'; Jevtoski (yellow card) 56'; Simon 62'	Stadium: Grosics Gyula Stadion; Attendance: 2,200; Referee: Imre Kovács

29 February 2024 Round of 16	Újpest	1–2 (a.e.t.)	Paks	Budapest
19:00 CET (UTC+1)	Ljujić (yellow card) 18'; Radošević 47'; Jevtoski (yellow card) 90'	Report	Skribek 21'; Mezei (yellow card) 69'; Lenzsér (yellow card) 93'; Könyves 110', (red card) 114'; Kinyik (yellow card) 120+3'	Stadium: Szusza Ferenc Stadion; Attendance: 2,389; Referee: Tamás Bognár

== Statistics ==
=== Overall ===
Appearances (Apps) numbers are for appearances in competitive games only, including sub appearances.
Source: Competitions

No.	Player	Pos.	Nemzeti Bajnokság I				Magyar Kupa				Total			
No.	Player	Pos.	Apps	Goal	Booked	Sent off (straight red)	Apps	Goal	Booked	Sent off (straight red)	Apps	Goal	Booked	Sent off (straight red)
1	(Hungary) Gellért Genzler	GK												
2	(Albania) Albi Doka	DF	5				1				6			
2	(Kosovo) Lirim Kastrati	DF	13		2		2				15		2	
3	(Hungary) Csanád Fehér	DF	12				2	1			14	1		
5	(Georgia (country)) Davit Kobouri	DF	14		3		1				15		3	
6	(Germany) Luca Mack	MF	25	1	7		3				28	1	7	
7	(Hungary) Krisztián Simon	MF	21	1			2	1			23	2		
8	(Dominican Republic) Heinz Mörschel	MF	31	6	6		1				32	6	6	
10	(Hungary) Mátyás Tajti	MF	23	2	3		3				26	2	3	
11	(Hungary) Tamás Kiss	MF	26		1		2		1		28		2	
13	(Serbia) Đorđe Nikolić	GK	5				1				6			
13	(Hungary) Balázs Simon	FW												
15	(Hungary) Miron Mucsányi	MF	4								4			
17	(Romania) George Ganea	FW	24		3		2				26		3	
18	(Hungary) András Huszti	DF	8	1	2						8	1	2	
19	(Ivory Coast) Aboubakar Keita	MF	12	1	2	1	1				13	1	2	1
20	(Estonia) Märten Kuusk	DF	1								1			
21	(Hungary) György Varga	MF	9	1	1						9	1	1	
22	(Hungary) Krisztián Tamás	DF	23	1	1	1					23	1	1	1
23	(Hungary) Dávid Banai	GK	21		2		2				23		2	
26	(Hungary) Bálint Geiger	MF	6				1				7			
27	(Nigeria) Franklin Sasere	FW	19		1		2				21		1	
28	(Serbia) Ognjen Radošević	MF	16	2	3		2	1			18	3	3	
29	(Nigeria) Vincent Onovo	MF	18	2	1		2	1			20	3	1	
30	(Estonia) Oliver Jürgens	FW	6				2	1			8	1		
31	(Hungary) Zsombor Molnár	GK	8								8			
32	(Nigeria) Peter Ambrose	FW	31	9	3		3	1			34	10	3	
33	(Serbia) Miloš Kosanović	DF	9		2		1				10		2	
33	(Hungary) Márk Mucsányi	MF												
34	(Luxembourg) Tim Hall	DF	15		2	1	1				16		2	1
42	(Greece) Georgios Antzoulas	DF	24	1	2		1				25	1	2	
45	(North Macedonia) Stefan Jevtoski	MF	5		1	1	2		2		7		3	1
49	(Serbia) Branko Pauljević	DF	27		4		3				30		4	
57	(Hungary) Ákos Tóth	FW	1		1						1		1	
62	(Hungary) Dominik Kovács	DF	3				1				4			
77	(Hungary) Kevin Csoboth	FW	32	7	2	1	3				35	7	2	1
88	(Serbia) Matija Ljujić	MF	19	10	5		2		1		21	10	6	
Own goals														
Totals				45	60	5		6	4			51	64	5

=== Hat-tricks ===
No.	Player	Against	Result	Date	Competition
88	(Serbia) Matija Ljujić	Puskás Akadémia (A)	3–3	4 August 2023	Nemzeti Bajnokság I

=== Clean sheets ===
			Clean sheets		
No.	Player	Games Played	Nemzeti Bajnokság I	Magyar Kupa	Total
23	(Hungary) Dávid Banai	23	4	0	4
13	(Serbia) Đorđe Nikolić	6	0	1	1
31	(Hungary) Zsombor Molnár	8	1		1
1	(Hungary) Gellért Genzler	0			0
Totals			5	1	6
