= Mohammed Khalfan =

Mohammed Khalfan may refer to:

- Mohammed Khalfan (footballer, born 1992), Emirati footballer
- Mohammed Khalfan (footballer, born 1998), Emirati footballer
