= Abdullah Nasser (footballer, born 1998) =

Emirati association football player

Abdullah Nasser عبد الله ناصر
Personal information
- Full name: Abdullah Nasser Hassan Mohammed Al-Mazmi
- Date of birth: 20 August 1998 (age 28)
- Place of birth: Emirates
- Height: 1.77 m (5 ft 10 in)
- Position: Left back

Youth career
- Al-Sharjah

Senior career*
Years	Team	Apps	(Gls)
2018–2020	Al-Sharjah	0	(0)
2020–2021	Al-Fujairah	15	(0)
2021–2023	Al-Nasr	12	(0)
2023–2024	Al Urooba		
2024	Al Hamriyah		
- * Club domestic league appearances and goals as of 10:50, 30 December 2020 (UTC)

Abdullah Nasser (Arabic: عبد الله ناصر; born 20 August 1998), is an Emirati professional footballer who plays as a left back.

== Career statistics ==
=== Club ===
As of 30 December 2020.

== Career statistics ==
Club	Season	League			Cup		Continental		Other		Total	
Club	Season	Division	Apps	Goals	Apps	Goals	Apps	Goals	Apps	Goals	Apps	Goals
Al-Sharjah	2018–19	UAE Pro League	0	0	2	0	—		—		2	0
Al-Sharjah	2019–20	UAE Pro League	0	0	6	0	—		—		6	0
Al-Sharjah	Al-Sharjah Total		0	0	8	0	0	0	0	0	8	0
Al-Fujairah	2020–21	UAE Pro League	15	0	0	0	—		—		4	0
Career totals			15	0	8	0	0	0	0	0	23	0
