= Khalifa Al Saadi =

Emirati association football player (born 1997)

Khalifa Al Saadi خليفة السعدي
Personal information
- Full name: Khalifa Abdulla Khater Al Saadi
- Date of birth: 23 September 1997 (age 29)
- Place of birth: Emirates
- Height: 1.70 m (5 ft 7 in)
- Position: Midfielder

Youth career
- –2018: Al-Fujairah

Senior career*
Years	Team	Apps	(Gls)
2018–2024	Al-Fujairah		
- * Club domestic league appearances and goals

Khalifa Al Saadi (Arabic:خليفة السعدي) (born 23 September 1997) is an Emirati professional footballer who plays as a midfielder.

== Career ==
Al Saadi started his career at Al-Fujairah and is a product of the Al-Fujairah's youth system. On 14 March 2020, Al Saadi made his professional debut for Al-Fujairah against Al-Sharjah in the Pro League, replacing Ernest Asante .

== Career statistics ==
=== Club ===
As of 15 July 2020.

Club	Season	League			Cup			President Cup			Champions League			Total		
Club	Season	Apps	Goals	Assists	Apps	Goals	Assists	Apps	Goals	Assists	Apps	Goals	Assists	Apps	Goals	Assists
Al-Fujairah	2018–19	0	0	0	5	2	0	0	0	0	—			5	2	0
Al-Fujairah	2019–20	1	0	0	5	0	0	0	0	0	—			6	0	0
Al-Fujairah	Total	1	0	0	10	2	0	0	0	0	—			11	2	0
Career total		1	0	0	10	2	0	—						11	2	0
