= Álvaro Negredo =

Spanish footballer (born 1985)

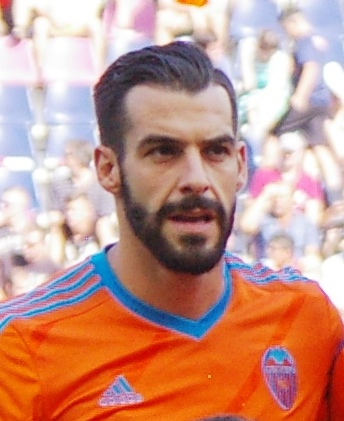
- Negredo with Valencia in 2015

Personal information
- Full name: Álvaro Negredo Sánchez
- Date of birth: 20 August 1985 (age 41)
- Place of birth: Madrid, Spain
- Height: 1.86 m (6 ft 1 in)
- Position: Striker

Youth career
- 1997–2001: Escuela Fútbol A.F.E
- 2001–2004: Rayo Vallecano

Senior career*
| Years | Team | Apps | (Gls) |
| 2003–2005 | Rayo Vallecano B | 40 | (28) |
| 2004–2005 | Rayo Vallecano | 12 | (1) |
| 2005–2007 | Real Madrid B | 65 | (22) |
| 2007–2009 | Almería | 70 | (32) |
| 2009 | Real Madrid | 0 | (0) |
| 2009–2013 | Sevilla | 139 | (70) |
| 2013–2015 | Manchester City | 32 | (9) |
| 2014–2015 | → Valencia (loan) | 30 | (5) |
| 2015–2017 | Valencia | 25 | (5) |
| 2016–2017 | → Middlesbrough (loan) | 36 | (9) |
| 2017–2018 | Beşiktaş | 35 | (9) |
| 2018–2020 | Al-Nasr | 36 | (25) |
| 2020–2024 | Cádiz | 97 | (16) |
| 2024 | Valladolid | 12 | (1) |
| Total | | 629 | (232) |

International career
| 2006 | Spain U21 | 1 | (0) |
| 2009–2013 | Spain | 21 | (10) |
Medal record
Representing Spain
UEFA European Championship
| Winner | 2012 Poland–Ukraine |
- * Club domestic league appearances and goals

Álvaro Negredo Sánchez (Spanish pronunciation: [ˈalβaɾo neˈɣɾeðo ˈsantʃeθ]; born 20 August 1985) is a Spanish former professional footballer who played as a striker.

Nicknamed La fiera de Vallecas (The beast of Vallecas), he amassed totals of 361 matches and 128 goals over 12 La Liga seasons, for Almería, Sevilla, Valencia and Cádiz, while winning the Copa del Rey with the second of those teams in 2010. Abroad, he played in the Premier League for Manchester City – lifting the league and League Cup in 2014 – and Middlesbrough, as well as representing Beşiktaş in Turkey and Al-Nasr in the United Arab Emirates.

Negredo earned 21 caps for Spain, scoring ten goals and being part of the team that won Euro 2012.

== Club career ==
=== Real Madrid and Almería ===
Born in Madrid, Negredo started his career at Rayo Vallecano, making his professional debut in early 2005 with the club in the Segunda División B. In the middle of the year he moved to another side in the country's capital, Real Madrid affiliate Real Madrid Castilla.

Negredo developed as a striker in his last season, scoring 18 league goals, although he could not prevent Castilla's drop from Segunda División. He did manage to impress first-team coach Fabio Capello and was called up for a few games in the Copa del Rey, but remained an unused substitute.

In July 2007, Negredo was sold to La Liga newcomers UD Almería, with Real Madrid having an option to buy him back. He made his top flight debut on 26 August in a 3–0 shock win at Deportivo de La Coruña. on 2 February 2008, he scored from the penalty spot in a 2–0 home defeat of his former team and, on 19 April, he added two – after having missed a penalty kick – in a 4–1 away victory over UEFA Cup and Spanish Cup holders Sevilla FC.

Negredo finished the campaign as Almería's top scorer with 13 goals, as the Andalusian side finished eighth. In 2008–09 he scored five in the team's first six matches, including a 95th-minute winner against neighbours Recreativo de Huelva (1–0) on 28 September 2008. In February of the following year he scored twice against Valencia CF in a 3–2 away loss, which took his league tally to ten, and finished with 19.

Real Madrid exercised their buyback option of a reported €5 million on Negredo in June 2009, and the player returned to training with the club on 10 July. In the pre-season, he scored the fourth goal against L.D.U. Quito in a 4–2 win in the Peace Cup.

=== Sevilla ===
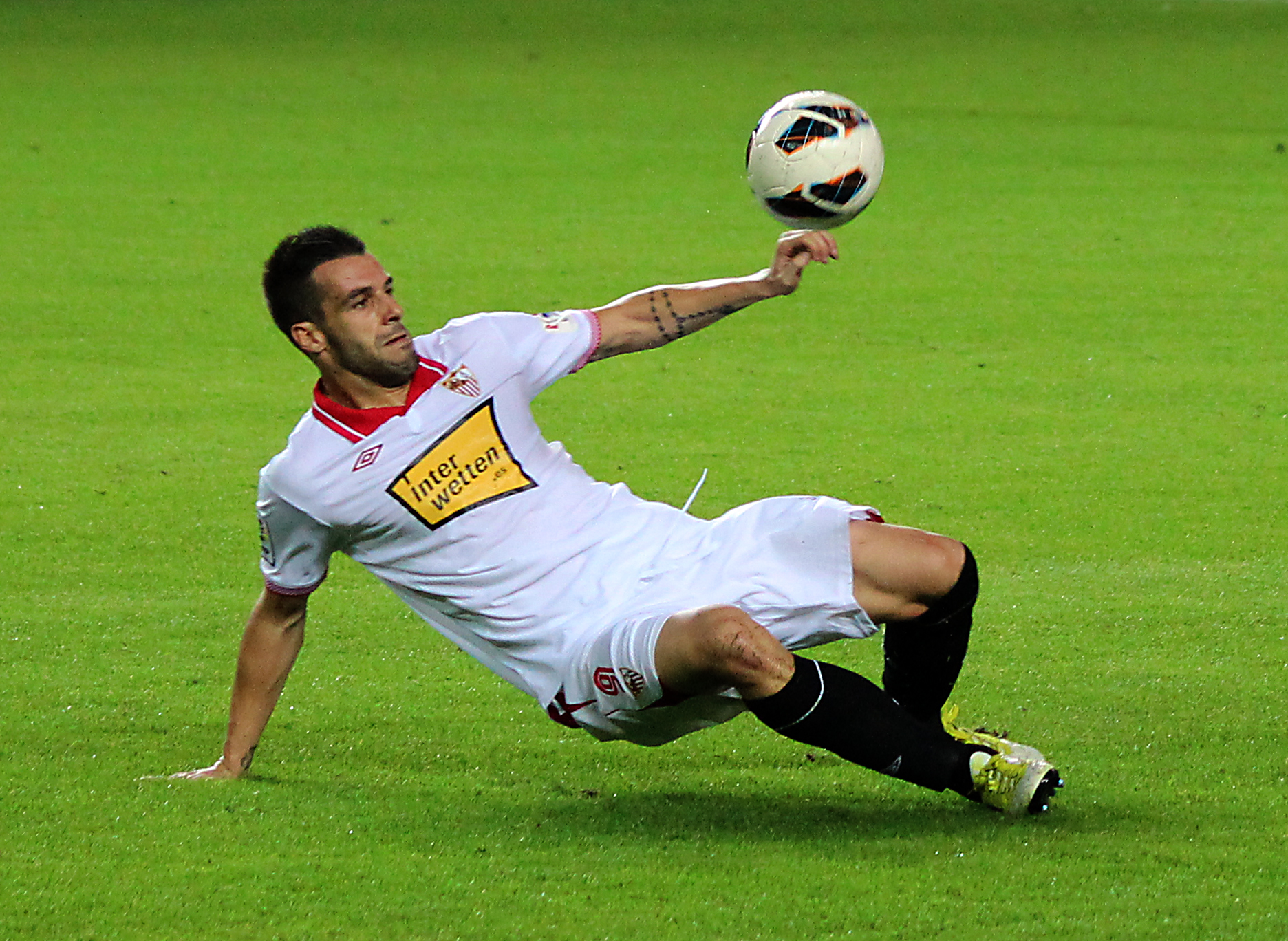
Negredo in action for Sevilla in 2012

Negredo had been tipped to join Real Zaragoza or Hull City in summer 2009, but finally decided to sign a reported five-year deal with Sevilla for €15 million, with Real Madrid having an option to buy the player back in the first two years. New manager Manuel Pellegrini could not guarantee him first-team football with the likes of Karim Benzema, Gonzalo Higuaín, Klaas-Jan Huntelaar, Ruud van Nistelrooy and Cristiano Ronaldo in the squad, and subsequently advised him to leave in order to fulfill his potential; Negredo later revealed his admiration for Pellegrini's honesty. He made his debut on 30 August, coming as a substitute in the 55th minute of a 2–0 away loss to Valencia. He scored his first goal two weeks later, at CA Osasuna in a 2–0 win.

A starter throughout most of 2009–10, with Luís Fabiano and Frédéric Kanouté fighting for the other striker berth, Negredo's first year was highly irregular. He suffered a scoring drought that lasted (in the league alone) 12 games, only ending on 2 May 2010 in a 3–1 home win against Atlético Madrid, his two goals coming from penalties (he had already lost his starting position at the time, but the Malian was suspended for that game). He added another two in the following match, a 5–1 away rout of Racing de Santander for a total of 11 in the league, and scored one more in the UEFA Champions League. He was also sent off three times in the season, the last of which almost prevented him from taking part in the domestic cup final against Atlético Madrid after insulting the assistant referee in Sevilla's 3–2 win at former club Almería; the ban was later lifted and he was allowed to play – Fabiano was unavailable for the match through injury – in the 2–0 final victory.

Negredo was a regular first choice in the 2010–11 campaign, scoring 26 times in all competitions, 20 in the league (Fabiano also returned to São Paulo FC in March 2011). Highlights included two goals each against Villarreal CF (3–3 away draw in the cup, in an eventual semi-final run), Deportivo (3–3 away draw), Real Madrid (6–2 home loss), Osasuna (3–2 loss, away) and RCD Espanyol (3–2 away victory).

Negredo took his 2012–13 league total to 13 on 4 March 2013, after scoring a hat-trick in a 4–1 home win over RC Celta de Vigo. He scored all of his team's goals on the last day of the season, a 4–3 defeat of Valencia CF also at the Ramón Sánchez Pizjuán Stadium, clinching the Zarra Trophy in the process.

=== Manchester City ===
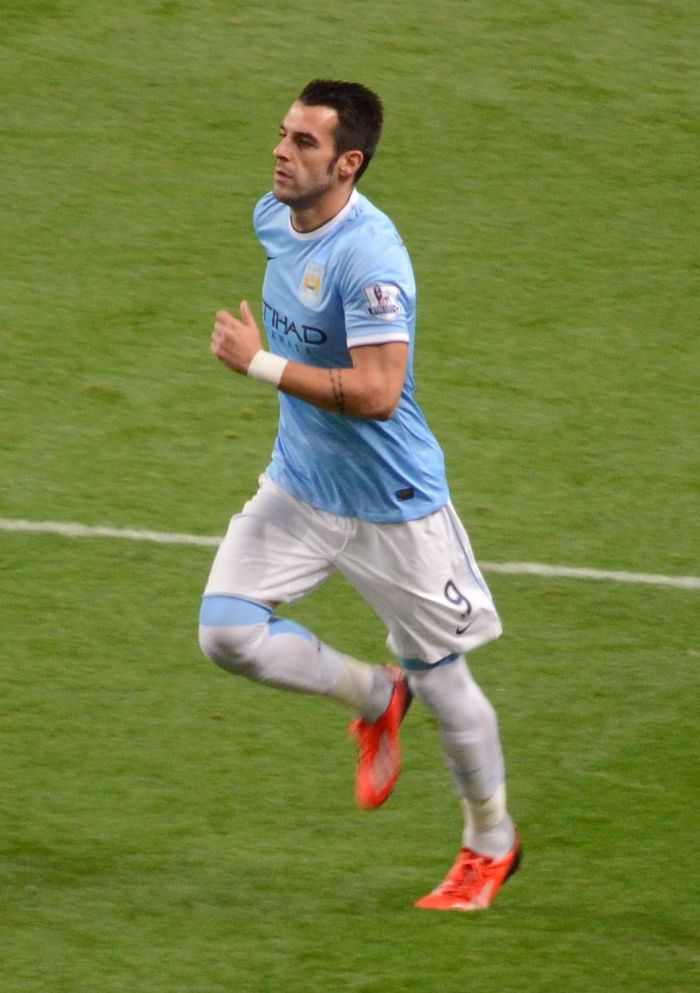
Negredo playing for Manchester City in 2013

On 19 July 2013, Manchester City announced the signing of Negredo; the fee was reported as £16.4 million plus add-ons, and he signed a four-year deal. He made his Premier League debut on 19 August, coming on as a substitute for countryman David Silva in a 4–0 home win against Newcastle United. He scored his first goal for the club the following match, a header in a 3–2 defeat at newly promoted Cardiff City. His first at the City of Manchester Stadium arrived in the next round, a 2–0 home victory over Hull City.

On 5 November 2013, Negredo scored his first hat-trick for City, contributing to a 5–2 group stage home win against PFC CSKA Moscow that qualified the former for the round of 16; this was the first time a Manchester City player had scored a hat-trick in the Champions League. He repeated the feat on 8 January of the following year, in a 6–0 home rout of West Ham United in the first leg of the semi-finals of the Football League Cup.

Despite not scoring since January 2014, Negredo finished the season with 23 goals from 48 appearances in all competitions as City won the league. He played the last two minutes of the 3–1 win over Sunderland in the League Cup final on 2 March, being booked for a foul on Phil Bardsley.

=== Valencia and loan to Middlesbrough ===
On 1 September 2014, Negredo signed a loan deal with Valencia, which included an obligatory clause to buy his rights at the end of the campaign for a club record amount believed to be around €27 million. He scored his first competitive goal in his first appearance on 7 December, starting in a 1–1 away draw against Granada CF which was also his first appearance.

Negredo joined Valencia on a permanent basis on 1 July 2015. On 25 August, he helped his team to reach the Champions League group phase by scoring in the fourth minute of an eventual 2–1 loss at AS Monaco FC (4–3 on aggregate). In October, after criticising manager Nuno Espírito Santo's choice of tactics, he was completely ostracised; he began to play again under new boss Gary Neville, notably scoring three goals in a 4–0 home victory against Granada in the domestic cup.

On 20 July 2016, Negredo returned to the Premier League by joining Middlesbrough on a season-long loan, accompanying several compatriots including manager Aitor Karanka. He scored in his first appearance on 13 August, putting the hosts ahead in a 1–1 home draw with Stoke City; On 26 November, he gave Boro the lead twice in a 2–2 draw at title holders Leicester City, and another brace three weeks later contributed to a 3–0 victory against visitors Swansea City; he was top scorer for the Riverside Stadium club with nine goals as they were relegated to the EFL Championship.

=== Beşiktaş ===
On 3 August 2017, Negredo signed for Süper Lig side Beşiktaş J.K. on a three-year deal. He scored his first goal for his new team on 28 October, helping them to a 2–1 away win over Alanyaspor. During his first weeks, he failed to establish his place in the starting eleven due to the good form of Cenk Tosun, who was sold to Everton in the winter transfer window.

On 16 August 2018, Negredo came on as a substitute and scored a last-minute winner in a 2–1 away defeat to LASK in the Europa League third-qualifying round, leading the Black Eagles to the play-off round on the away goals rule 2–2 on aggregate. He celebrated by taking off his shirt, and received a second yellow card for the excessive celebration.

Beşiktaş and Negredo mutually terminated their contract on 18 September 2018. He later cited the club's financial struggles as the reason behind the termination.

=== Al-Nasr ===
On 18 September 2018, Negredo signed for Al-Nasr SC on a two-year contract. His maiden appearance in the UAE Pro League took place three days later, and he missed a penalty late into a 3–0 home loss to Al Ain FC.

Negredo scored in the first minute of the final of the UAE League Cup against Shabab Al-Ahli Dubai FC on 17 January 2020, eventually helping his team to win their second title in the competition after the 2–1 victory.

=== Cádiz ===
Negredo returned to his homeland in July 2020, with the 34-year-old agreeing to a one-year deal at Cádiz CF who had just returned to the top division. He scored in his second appearance, helping to a 2–0 away win over SD Huesca. He added a further seven until the end of the season – squad best – as the side easily managed to avoid relegation, automatically renewing his contract until June 2022.

On 2 December 2021, Negredo scored a hat-trick in the first round of the Spanish Cup in a 7–0 victory at amateurs CD Villa de Fortuna. He and Anthony Lozano were the joint top scorers for the campaign with seven goals each, as they avoided relegation by one point; his minutes were enough to add another year to his link by March.

Negredo signed a new extension in November 2022, keeping him at the Nuevo Mirandilla until June 2024. On 1 February 2024, however, having made just nine competitive appearances in the first part of the season, he was released.

=== Valladolid ===
On 8 February 2024, Negredo joined second-tier Real Valladolid until the end of the campaign. He totalled 585 minutes for the runners-up, scoring once and helping his team to promotion.

After several months without a team and having started to work towards earning his coaching licence at Sevilla C, Negredo announced his retirement on 6 March 2025.

== International career ==
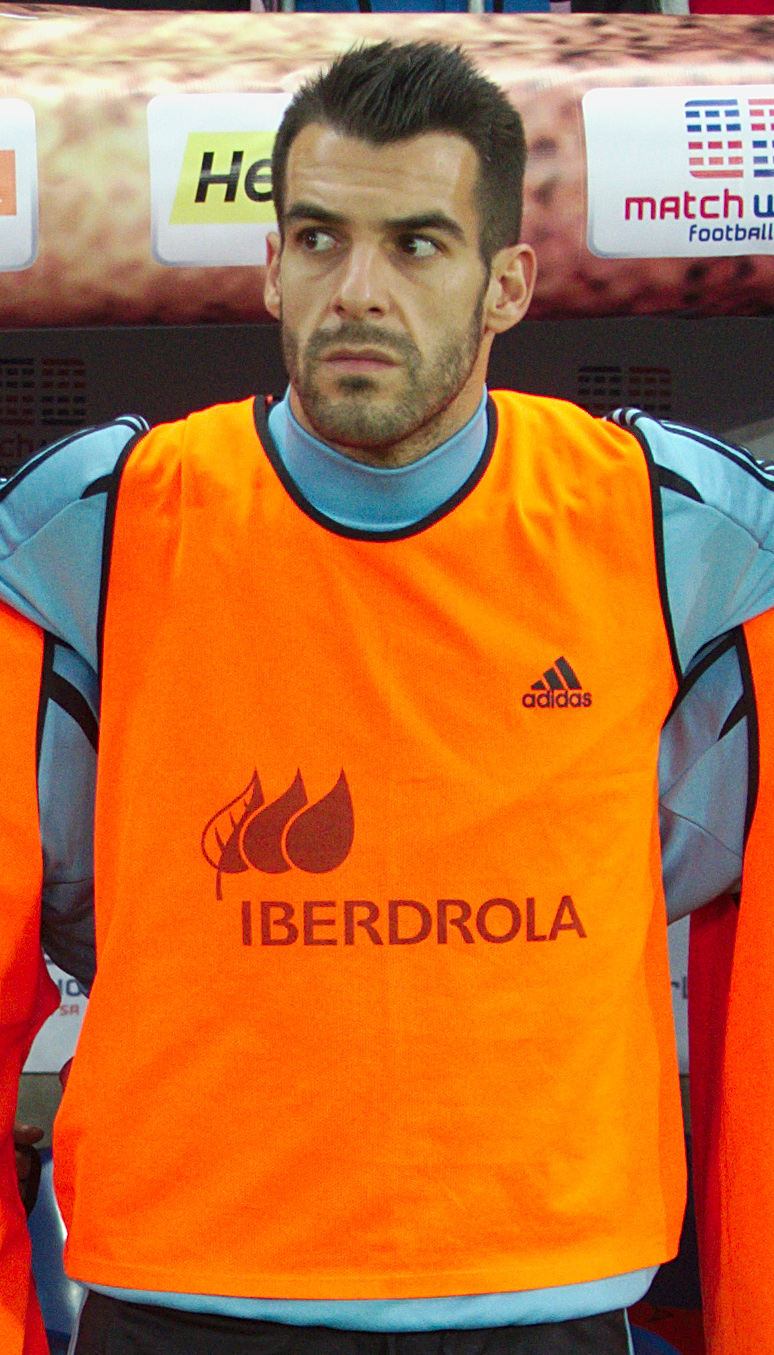
Negredo on the substitutes' bench for Spain in 2013

On 6 October 2009, Negredo received his first call to the Spain senior team, for a 2010 FIFA World Cup qualifier against Armenia on the 10th, following the injuries of David Villa and Daniel Güiza. He made his debut in that game, replacing Fernando Torres early into the second half of an eventual 2–1 away win.

Four days later, Negredo started and scored twice – also providing two assists – in another away fixture, at Bosnia and Herzegovina (5–2 triumph), as Spain eventually won all ten group matches. He was, however, overlooked for the final stages in South Africa, with the national team winning the tournament.

Negredo was chosen by manager Vicente del Bosque for his UEFA Euro 2012 squad. He played twice in the tournament in Poland and Ukraine, including one start against Portugal in the semi-finals (4–2 penalty shootout win, 0–0 after 120 minutes).

Negredo was one of seven players cut from Spain's final squad for the 2014 World Cup, alongside City teammate Jesús Navas.

== Style of play ==
A tall striker with an eye for goal, Negredo mainly operated in a central role. While he was regarded as a static forward, he was also known for his powerful striking ability with his left foot and his strength in the air, and was also capable of dropping into deeper positions in order to link-up with the midfielders.

== Personal life ==
Negredo's older brothers, César (born 1980) and Rubén (1985), were also footballers, the former a defender and the latter a forward. Both played their entire careers in division three or lower.

His father, José María, worked as a taxi driver in Madrid.

== Career statistics ==
=== Club ===
Appearances and goals by club, season and competition
| Club | Season | League | | | National cup (Note: Includes Copa del Rey, FA Cup, Turkish Cup, UAE President's Cup) | | League cup (Note: Includes Football League Cup, UAE League Cup) | | Continental | | Other | | Total | |
| Club | Season | Division | Apps | Goals | Apps | Goals | Apps | Goals | Apps | Goals | Apps | Goals | Apps | Goals |
|---|---|---|---|---|---|---|---|---|---|---|---|---|---|---|
| Rayo Vallecano B | 2003–04 | Tercera División | 15 | 14 | — | | — | | — | | — | | 15 | 14 |
| Rayo Vallecano B | 2004–05 | Tercera División | 25 | 14 | — | | — | | — | | — | | 25 | 14 |
| Rayo Vallecano B | Total | | 40 | 28 | — | | — | | — | | — | | 40 | 28 |
| Rayo Vallecano | 2004–05 | Segunda División B | 12 | 1 | 0 | 0 | — | | — | | 1 (Note: Appearance in Segunda División B play-offs) | 0 | 13 | 1 |
| Real Madrid B | 2005–06 | Segunda División | 25 | 4 | — | | — | | — | | — | | 25 | 4 |
| Real Madrid B | 2006–07 | Segunda División | 40 | 18 | — | | — | | — | | — | | 40 | 18 |
| Real Madrid B | Total | | 65 | 22 | — | | — | | — | | — | | 65 | 22 |
| Almería | 2007–08 | La Liga | 36 | 13 | 2 | 0 | — | | — | | — | | 38 | 13 |
| Almería | 2008–09 | La Liga | 34 | 19 | 1 | 0 | — | | — | | — | | 35 | 19 |
| Almería | Total | | 70 | 32 | 3 | 0 | — | | — | | — | | 73 | 32 |
| Sevilla | 2009–10 | La Liga | 35 | 11 | 7 | 2 | — | | 7 (Note: Appearances in UEFA Champions League) | 1 | — | | 49 | 14 |
| Sevilla | 2010–11 | La Liga | 38 | 20 | 7 | 5 | — | | 8 (Note: Two appearances in UEFA Champions League, six appearances and one goal in UEFA Europa League) | 1 | 2 (Note: Appearances in Supercopa de España) | 0 | 55 | 26 |
| Sevilla | 2011–12 | La Liga | 30 | 14 | 4 | 0 | — | | 2 (Note: Appearances in UEFA Europa League) | 0 | — | | 36 | 14 |
| Sevilla | 2012–13 | La Liga | 36 | 25 | 6 | 6 | — | | — | | — | | 42 | 31 |
| Sevilla | Total | | 139 | 70 | 24 | 13 | — | | 17 | 2 | 2 | 0 | 182 | 85 |
| Manchester City | 2013–14 | Premier League | 32 | 9 | 4 | 3 | 5 | 6 | 8 | 5 | — | | 49 | 23 |
| Valencia | 2014–15 | La Liga | 30 | 5 | 4 | 1 | — | | — | | — | | 34 | 6 |
| Valencia | 2015–16 | La Liga | 25 | 5 | 6 | 5 | — | | 9 (Note: Five appearances and one goal in UEFA Champions League, four appearances and one goal in UEFA Europa League) | 2 | — | | 40 | 12 |
| Valencia | Total | | 55 | 10 | 10 | 6 | — | | 9 | 2 | 0 | 0 | 74 | 18 |
| Middlesbrough | 2016–17 | Premier League | 36 | 9 | 4 | 1 | 0 | 0 | — | | — | | 40 | 10 |
| Beşiktaş | 2017–18 | Süper Lig | 31 | 7 | 6 | 7 | — | | 5 | 1 | 1 (Note: Appearance in Turkish Super Cup) | 0 | 43 | 15 |
| Beşiktaş | 2018–19 | Süper Lig | 4 | 2 | 0 | 0 | — | | 2 | 1 | 0 | 0 | 6 | 3 |
| Beşiktaş | Total | | 35 | 9 | 6 | 7 | — | | 7 | 2 | 1 | 0 | 49 | 18 |
| Al-Nasr | 2018–19 | UAE Pro League | 19 | 17 | 2 | 0 | 4 | 2 | 1 (Note: Appearance in AFC Champions League) | 1 | — | | 26 | 20 |
| Al-Nasr | 2019–20 | UAE Pro League | 17 | 8 | 1 | 1 | 9 | 3 | — | | — | | 27 | 12 |
| Al-Nasr | Total | | 36 | 25 | 3 | 1 | 13 | 5 | 1 | 1 | — | | 53 | 32 |
| Cádiz | 2020–21 | La Liga | 35 | 8 | 0 | 0 | — | | — | | — | | 35 | 8 |
| Cádiz | 2021–22 | La Liga | 34 | 7 | 5 | 3 | — | | — | | — | | 39 | 10 |
| Cádiz | 2022–23 | La Liga | 21 | 1 | 1 | 1 | — | | — | | — | | 22 | 2 |
| Cádiz | 2023–24 | La Liga | 7 | 0 | 2 | 0 | — | | — | | — | | 9 | 0 |
| Cádiz | Total | | 97 | 16 | 8 | 4 | — | | — | | — | | 105 | 20 |
| Valladolid | 2023–24 | Segunda División | 12 | 1 | — | | — | | — | | — | | 12 | 1 |
| Career total | | | 629 | 232 | 62 | 35 | 18 | 11 | 42 | 12 | 4 | 0 | 755 | 290 |

=== International ===
Appearances and goals by national team and year
| National team | Year | Apps | Goals |
|---|---|---|---|
| Spain | 2009 | 4 | 2 |
| Spain | 2010 | 0 | 0 |
| Spain | 2011 | 3 | 3 |
| Spain | 2012 | 5 | 1 |
| Spain | 2013 | 9 | 4 |
| Total | | 21 | 10 |

Scores and results list Spain's goal tally first, score column indicates score after each Negredo goal.

List of international goals scored by Álvaro Negredo
| No. | Date | Venue | Opponent | Score | Result | Competition |
|---|---|---|---|---|---|---|
| 1 | 14 October 2009 | Bilino Polje, Zenica, Bosnia and Herzegovina | Bosnia and Herzegovina | 3–0 | 5–2 | 2010 FIFA World Cup qualification |
| 2 | 14 October 2009 | Bilino Polje, Zenica, Bosnia and Herzegovina | Bosnia and Herzegovina | 4–0 | 5–2 | 2010 FIFA World Cup qualification |
| 3 | 4 June 2011 | Gillette Stadium, Foxborough, United States | United States | 2–0 | 4–0 | Friendly |
| 4 | 6 September 2011 | Las Gaunas, Logroño, Spain | Liechtenstein | 1–0 | 6–0 | UEFA Euro 2012 qualifying |
| 5 | 6 September 2011 | Las Gaunas, Logroño, Spain | Liechtenstein | 2–0 | 6–0 | UEFA Euro 2012 qualifying |
| 6 | 30 May 2012 | Stade de Suisse, Bern, Switzerland | South Korea | 4–1 | 4–1 | Friendly |
| 7 | 14 August 2013 | Monumental Isidro Romero Carbo, Guayaquil, Ecuador | Ecuador | 1–0 | 2–0 | Friendly |
| 8 | 6 September 2013 | Olympic Stadium, Helsinki, Finland | Finland | 2–0 | 2–0 | 2014 FIFA World Cup qualification |
| 9 | 11 October 2013 | Iberostar Stadium, Palma, Spain | Belarus | 2–0 | 2–1 | 2014 FIFA World Cup qualification |
| 10 | 15 October 2013 | Carlos Belmonte, Albacete, Spain | Georgia | 1–0 | 2–0 | 2014 FIFA World Cup qualification |

== Honours ==
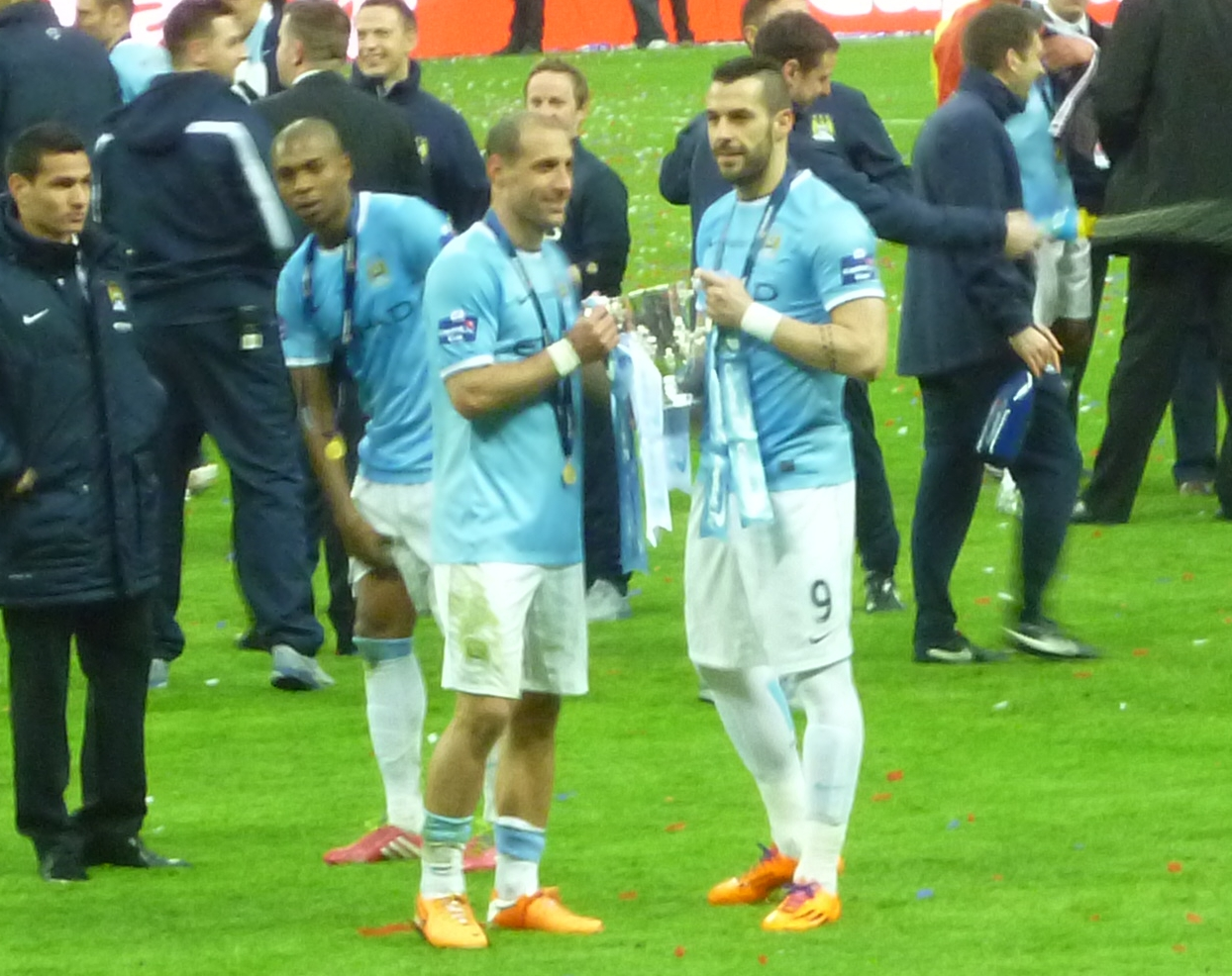
Negredo (right) with Pablo Zabaleta after winning the 2014 League Cup

Sevilla

- Copa del Rey: 2009–10

Manchester City

- Premier League: 2013–14
- Football League Cup: 2013–14

Al Nasr

- UAE League Cup: 2019–20

Spain

- UEFA European Championship: 2012

Individual

- Zarra Trophy: 2010–11, 2012–13
- Football League Cup top scorer: 2013–14
- Copa del Rey top scorer: 2015–16
