= 2010 Copa del Rey final =

- Event: 2009–10 Copa del Rey
| Sevilla | Atlético Madrid |
| 2 | 0 |
- Date: 19 May 2010
- Venue: Camp Nou, Barcelona
- Referee: Manuel Mejuto González
- Attendance: 93,000
- Weather: Partly cloudy 16 °C (61 °F)

The 2010 Copa del Rey final was the 108th final since the tournament's establishment (including two seasons where two rival editions were played). The match took place on 19 May 2010 at the Camp Nou, Barcelona. The match was contested by Sevillla FC and Atlético Madrid, and it was refereed by Manuel Mejuto González. Sevilla lifted the trophy for the fifth time in their history with a 2–0 victory.

== Road to the final ==
| Sevilla | | | Round | Atlético Madrid |
|---|---|---|---|---|---|---|
| Opponent | Result | Legs | | Opponent | Result | Legs |
| Atlético Ciudad | 9–3 | 4–2 away; 5–1 home | Round of 32 | Marbella | 8–0 | 2–0 away; 6–0 home |
| Barcelona | 2–2 (ag) | 2–1 away; 0–1 home | Round of 16 | Recreativo | 5–4 | 0–3 away; 5–1 home |
| Deportivo La Coruña | 3–1 | 3–0 away; 0–1 home | Quarterfinals | Celta Vigo | 2–1 | 1–1 home; 1–0 away |
| Getafe | 2–1 | 2–0 home; 0–1 away | Semifinals | Racing Santander | 6–3 | 4–0 home; 2–3 away |

== Match details ==
19 May 2010
21:30 CEST

| Sevilla | 2–0 | Atlético Madrid |
|---|---|---|
| Capel 5'; Navas 90+1' | Report |

Camp Nou, Barcelona
Attendance: 93,000
Referee: Manuel Mejuto González

| Sevilla | Atlético Madrid |

Sevilla:
| GK | 1 | (Spain) Andrés Palop (c) |
| DF | 24 | (France) Abdoulay Konko |
| DF | 4 | (France) Sébastien Squillaci | (yellow card) 61' |
| DF | 14 | (France) Julien Escudé |
| DF | 37 | (Spain) Antonio Luna | (yellow card) 35' |
| MF | 7 | (Spain) Jesús Navas |
| MF | 8 | (Ivory Coast) Didier Zokora |
| MF | 11 | (Brazil) Renato | (yellow card) 6' |
| MF | 16 | (Spain) Diego Capel | | (substituted off) 87' |
| FW | 12 | (Mali) Frédéric Kanouté | (yellow card) 83' |
| FW | 19 | (Spain) Álvaro Negredo | | (substituted off) 66' |
Substitutes:
| GK | 13 | (Spain) Javi Varas |
| DF | 15 | (Lithuania) Marius Stankevičius |
| MF | 25 | (Argentina) Diego Perotti | | (substituted on) 87' |
| MF | 22 | (Ivory Coast) Romaric | | (substituted on) 66' |
| MF | 23 | (Spain) Lolo |
| MF | 30 | (Spain) José Carlos |
| FW | 31 | (Spain) Rodri |
Manager:
(Spain) Antonio Álvarez

Atlético Madrid:
| GK | 13 | (Spain) David de Gea |
| DF | 17 | (Czech Republic) Tomáš Ujfaluši | (yellow card) 69' |
| DF | 21 | (Colombia) Luis Perea |
| DF | 18 | (Spain) Álvaro Domínguez |
| DF | 3 | (Spain) Antonio López (c) |
| MF | 20 | (Portugal) Simão Sabrosa | | (substituted off) 59' |
| MF | 12 | (Brazil) Paulo Assunção | | (substituted off) 59' |
| MF | 5 | (Portugal) Tiago |
| MF | 19 | (Spain) José Antonio Reyes |
| FW | 10 | (Argentina) Sergio Agüero |
| FW | 7 | (Uruguay) Diego Forlán |
Substitutes:
| GK | 42 | (Spain) Joel Robles |
| DF | 16 | (Spain) Juanito |
| DF | 2 | (Spain) Juan Valera |
| MF | 6 | (Spain) Ignacio Camacho |
| MF | 8 | (Spain) Raúl García | | (substituted on) 59' |
| MF | 9 | (Spain) José Manuel Jurado | | (substituted on) 59' |
| FW | 14 | (Argentina) Eduardo Salvio |
Manager:
(Spain) Quique Sánchez Flores

Match officials

- Assistant referees:
  - José Manuel Fernández Miranda (Asturias)
  - Raúl Cabañero Martínez (Murcia)
- Fourth official: Carlos Clos Gómez (Aragón)
- Fifth official: Xavier Aguilar Rodríguez (Catalonia)
