= Ognjen Radošević =

Serbian footballer (born 2003)

Personal information
- Date of birth: 1 August 2003 (age 23)
- Place of birth: Subotica, Serbia and Montenegro
- Height: 1.85 m (6 ft 1 in)
- Position: Midfielder

Team information
- Current team: BSK Banja Luka (on loan from Borac Banja Luka)
- Number: 14

Youth career
- 2016–2017: L-IT-SZEAC
- 2017–2018: Arena Subotica
- 2018: SZEOL
- 2018–2022: Újpest

Senior career*
Years	Team	Apps	(Gls)
2020–2025	Újpest	20	(2)
2021–2025	Újpest II	66	(18)
2023	→ Szentlőrinc (loan)	10	(0)
2024–2025	→ Nyíregyháza (loan)	3	(0)
2024–2025	→ Nyíregyháza II (loan)	2	(0)
2025–	Borac Banja Luka	6	(0)
2026–	→ BSK Banja Luka (loan)	11	(2)
- * Club domestic league appearances and goals as of 1 November 2026

Ognjen Radošević (Serbian Cyrillic: Огњен Радошевић; born 1 August 2003) is a Serbian professional footballer, who plays as a midfielder for Bosnian Premier League club BSK Banja Luka on loan from Borac Banja Luka.

== Career ==
In 2018, Radošević joined the youth academy of Hungarian Nemzeti Bajnokság I side Újpest. On 27 January 2022, he was promoted to the first team.

On 8 August 2025, Radošević and Újpest reached a mutual agreement to terminate his contract.

He signed for Bosnian Premier League club Borac Banja Luka on a three-year contract on 16 August 2025.

== Career statistics ==
As of match played 1 November 2026

Appearances and goals by club, season and competition
Club	Season	League			National cup (Note: Includes Magyar Kupa, Bosnian Cup)		Other		Total	
Club	Season	Division	Apps	Goals	Apps	Goals	Apps	Goals	Apps	Goals
Újpest	2020–21	Nemzeti Bajnokság I	0	0	—		—		0	0
Újpest	2022–23	Nemzeti Bajnokság I	0	0	1	0	—		1	0
Újpest	2023–24	Nemzeti Bajnokság I	16	2	2	1	—		18	3
Újpest	2024–25	Nemzeti Bajnokság I	4	0	—		—		4	0
Újpest	Total		20	2	3	1	—		23	3
Újpest II	2020–21	Nemzeti Bajnokság III	1	0	—		—		1	0
Újpest II	2021–22	Nemzeti Bajnokság III	32	7	—		—		32	7
Újpest II	2022–23	Nemzeti Bajnokság III	18	5	—		—		18	5
Újpest II	2023–24	Nemzeti Bajnokság III	14	6	—		—		14	6
Újpest II	2025–26	Nemzeti Bajnokság III	1	0	—		—		1	0
Újpest II	Total		66	18	—		—		66	18
Szentlőrinc (loan)	2022–23	Nemzeti Bajnokság II	10	0	—		1 (Note: Appearance in Nemzeti Bajnokság II relegation play-offs)	0	11	0
Nyíregyháza (loan)	2024–25	Nemzeti Bajnokság I	3	0	3	0	—		6	0
Nyíregyháza II (loan)	2024–25	Nemzeti Bajnokság III	2	0	—		—		2	0
Borac Banja Luka	2025–26	Bosnian Premier League	6	0	1	1	—		7	1
BSK Banja Luka (loan)	2026–27	Bosnian Premier League	11	2	0	0	—		11	2
Career total			118	22	7	2	1	0	126	24
