= György Varga =

Hungarian footballer (born 2003)

Personal information
- Full name: György Balázs Varga
- Date of birth: 23 October 2003 (age 23)
- Place of birth: Baja, Hungary
- Height: 1.77 m (5 ft 10 in)
- Position: Forward

Team information
- Current team: Budafok (on loan from Újpest)
- Number: 21

Youth career
- 2009–2018: Baja
- 2018–2019: Újpest
- 2019–2020: Vasas
- 2020–2022: Újpest

Senior career*
Years	Team	Apps	(Gls)
2020–	Újpest	26	(3)
2021–	Újpest II	55	(10)
2024–2025	→ Szeged (loan)	25	(4)
2025–	→ Budafok (loan)	30	(2)
- * Club domestic league appearances and goals as of 31 May 2026

György Varga (born 23 October 2003) is a Hungarian professional footballer, who plays as a forward for Nemzeti Bajnokság II club Budafok, on loan from Nemzeti Bajnokság I club Újpest.

== Career ==
On 24 January 2022, Varga signed with Nemzeti Bajnokság I club Újpest.

On 23 June 2025, he joined Nemzeti Bajnokság II team Budafok on a season-long loan.

== Career statistics ==
As of match played 3 August 2025

Appearances and goals by club, season and competition
Club	Season	League			National cup (Note: Includes Magyar Kupa)		Total	
Club	Season	Division	Apps	Goals	Apps	Goals	Apps	Goals
Újpest	2020–21	Nemzeti Bajnokság I	1	0	—		1	0
Újpest	2021–22	Nemzeti Bajnokság I	0	0	—		0	0
Újpest	2022–23	Nemzeti Bajnokság I	16	2	2	1	18	3
Újpest	2023–24	Nemzeti Bajnokság I	9	1	0	0	9	1
Újpest	Total		26	3	2	1	28	4
Újpest II	2020–21	Nemzeti Bajnokság III	2	0	—		2	0
Újpest II	2021–22	Nemzeti Bajnokság III	19	3	—		19	3
Újpest II	2022–23	Nemzeti Bajnokság III	16	4	—		16	4
Újpest II	2023–24	Nemzeti Bajnokság III	18	3	—		18	3
Újpest II	Total		55	10	—		55	10
Szeged (loan)	2024–25	Nemzeti Bajnokság II	25	4	2	0	27	4
Budafok (loan)	2025–26	Nemzeti Bajnokság II	2	0	0	0	2	0
Career total			108	17	4	1	112	18
