= Saleh Rabei =

Emirati association football player (born 1993)

Saleh Rabei صالح ربيع
Personal information
- Full name: Saleh Rabei Fairouz Al-Mesmari
- Date of birth: 4 May 1993 (age 33)
- Place of birth: Emirates
- Height: 1.78 m (5 ft 10 in)
- Position: Goalkeeper

Team information
- Current team: Al-Fujairah
- Number: 17

Youth career
- –2014: Al-Fujairah

Senior career*
Years	Team	Apps	(Gls)
2014–	Al-Fujairah	13	(0)
- * Club domestic league appearances and goals

Saleh Rabei (Arabic:صالح ربيع; born 4 May 1993) is an Emirati footballer. He currently plays as a goalkeeper for Al-Fujairah.

== Career ==
Saleh Rabei started his career at Al-Fujairah and is a product of the Al-Fujairah's youth system. landed with Al-Fujairah from the UAE Pro League to the UAE First Division League in 2015–16 season. ended up with Al-Fujairah from the UAE First Division League to the UAE Pro League in the 2017–18 season. On 31 August 2018, Saleh Rabei made his professional debut for Al-Fujairah against Baniyas in the Pro League .
