= Abdulla Anwar =

Emirati association football player (born 1999)

Abdulla Anwar عبد الله أنور
Personal information
- Full name: Abdulla Anwar Abdulla Al-Ameri
- Date of birth: 2 June 1999 (age 27)
- Place of birth: Emirates
- Height: 1.73 m (5 ft 8 in)
- Position: Forward

Team information
- Current team: Al-Fujairah
- Number: 11

Youth career
- –2019: Al Wahda

Senior career*
Years	Team	Apps	(Gls)
2019–2021	Al Wahda	18	(0)
2021–2024	Al Nasr	31	(1)
2024–2025	Al Urooba	20	(2)
2025–	Al-Fujairah	0	(0)

International career
2019–2023	United Arab Emirates U23		
2023–	United Arab Emirates	0	(0)
- * Club domestic league appearances and goals

Abdulla Anwar (Arabic:عبد الله أنور) (born 2 June 1999) is an Emirati footballer who plays for Al-Fujairah as a forward.

== Career ==
Abdulla Anwar started his career at Al-Wahda and is a product of the Al-Wahda's youth system. On 2 September 2019, Anwar Hattrick scored in Sharjah in the Arabian Gulf Cup . On 19 October 2019, Anwar made his professional debut for Al-Wahda against Al-Nasr in the Pro League, replacing Ismail Matar .
