= Peter Ambrose =

Nigerian footballer (born 2002)

Personal information
- Date of birth: 10 June 2002 (age 24)
- Place of birth: Nigeria
- Height: 1.84 m (6 ft 0 in)
- Position: Striker

Team information
- Current team: Neuchâtel Xamax
- Number: 32

Senior career*
Years	Team	Apps	(Gls)
2022	Balıkesirspor	12	(1)
2022–2024	Újpest	45	(10)
2024–2026	Aberdeen	15	(1)
2026	→ Diósgyőri VTK (loan)	6	(0)
2026–	Neuchâtel Xamax	6	(3)
- * Club domestic league appearances and goals as of 28 September 2026

Peter Ambrose (born 10 June 2002) is a Nigerian professional footballer who plays as a striker for Neuchâtel Xamax.

== Career ==
Ambrose commenced his football career in his native Nigeria with Optimum Academy in Abuja, before signing for Balıkesirspor's youth side in 2021. He made his professional debut against Samsunspor in January 2022.

In 2022, Ambrose signed for Hungarian side Újpest. He was regarded as one of the club's most important players. On 12 November 2022, he scored his first goal for the club during a 1–3 loss to Paks. He finished last season as the team's top goalscorer with 10 goals in 27 starts.

Ambrose signed for Aberdeen in June 2024 and became Jimmy Thelin's second summer signing. He signed a three-year deal with The Dons, for an undisclosed fee, with the option of an additional year.

Commenting on his transfer, Ambrose - who attracted interest from other clubs in the UK and Europe - said: "When I was told of the interest from Aberdeen I was so grateful. Growing up as a kid I knew about the Scottish League and Aberdeen, it is a big step for me." He scored his first goal for the club after coming on as a substitute in a 6-0 Scottish League Cup victory over Dumbarton.

On 3 February 2026, Ambrose joined Nemzeti Bajnokság I side Diósgyőri VTK on loan until the remainder of the season.

For the 2026-27 season, Ambrose was not given a Squad number and was frozen out by Aberdeen. On 18 August 2026, Ambrose joined Swiss Challenge League side Neuchâtel Xamax on a permanent deal.

== Style of play ==
Ambrose mainly operates as a striker.
