= Bruno de Oliveira =

Brazilian footballer (born 1990)

Bruno Oliveira
Personal information
- Full name: Bruno de Oliveira Silva
- Date of birth: 6 October 1990 (age 36)
- Place of birth: Recife, Brazil
- Height: 1.78 m (5 ft 10 in)
- Position: Forward

Youth career
- Grêmio

Senior career*
Years	Team	Apps	(Gls)
2007	Central Español		
2009	Bella Vista	3	(0)
2009–2012	Fénix	3	(0)
2012	Remo		
2013	Inter de Limeira	8	(0)
2014	Progreso	9	(1)
- * Club domestic league appearances and goals

Bruno de Oliveira Silva (born 6 October 1990) is a former Brazilian footballer.

== Career statistics ==
=== Club ===
Club	Season	League			State League		Cup		Continental		Other		Total	
Club	Season	Division	Apps	Goals	Apps	Goals	Apps	Goals	Apps	Goals	Apps	Goals	Apps	Goals
Bella Vista	2008–09	Uruguayan Primera División	3	0	–		0	0	0	0	0	0	3	0
Centro Atlético Fénix	2009–10	Uruguayan Primera División	3	0	–		0	0	0	0	0	0	3	0
Inter de Limeira	2013	–			8 (Note: Appearances in the Campeonato Paulista A3)	1	0	0	0	0	0	0	8	1
Bella Vista	2013–14	Uruguayan Segunda División	9	1	–		0	0	0	0	0	0	9	1
Career total			15	1	8	1	0	0	0	0	0	0	23	2
