= Mohammed Khalfan (footballer, born 1992) =

Emirati footballer

Personal information
- Full name: Mohammed Khalfan Ali Salmein Al Mesmari
- Date of birth: 29 December 1992 (age 33)
- Place of birth: Khor Fakkan, United Arab Emirates
- Height: 1.75 m (5 ft 9 in)
- Position: Winger

Youth career
- Al-Fujairah

Senior career*
Years	Team	Apps	(Gls)
2010–2015	Fujairah	50	(8)
2015–2017	Al-Wasl	18	(0)
2017	→ Dibba Al-Fujairah (loan)	5	(0)
2017–2019	Fujairah	42	(14)
2019–2021	Sharjah	23	(2)
2021–2022	Khor Fakkan	2	(0)
2022	→ Al Urooba (loan)	12	(4)
2022–2023	Dibba Al Fujairah	6	(0)
2023	Hatta		
2023–2024	Al Urooba		

International career^{‡}
2019	United Arab Emirates	2	(0)
- * Club domestic league appearances and goals ‡ National team caps and goals as of 26 March 2019

Mohammed Khalfan Ali Salmein Al Mesmari (Arabic: محمد خلفان, born 29 December 1992) is an Emirati footballer who plays as a winger.

== International ==
He made his debut for the United Arab Emirates national football team on 26 March 2019 in a friendly against Syria.
