= Resende (footballer) =

Brazilian footballer

Rafael Resende
Personal information
- Full name: Rafael dos Santos Resende
- Date of birth: 5 March 2000 (age 26)
- Height: 1.77 m (5 ft 10 in)
- Position: Midfielder

Team information
- Current team: Calicut
- Number: 77

Youth career
- –2019: Fluminense

Senior career*
Years	Team	Apps	(Gls)
2019–2021	Sharjah	4	(1)
2020	→ Khor Fakkan (loan)	0	(0)
2021	→ Al Bataeh (loan)	-	(-)
2022–23	Auda	41	(0)
2024–	Calicut	6	(0)
- * Club domestic league appearances and goals as of 10 November 2024

Rafael dos Santos Resende (born 5 March 2000), commonly known as Rafael Resende, is a Brazilian footballer who currently plays for the Super League Kerala club Calicut.

== Career statistics ==
=== Club ===
As of 26 October 2019.

Club	Season	League			Cup		Continental		Other		Total	
Club	Season	Division	Apps	Goals	Apps	Goals	Apps	Goals	Apps	Goals	Apps	Goals
Sharjah	2019–20	UAE Pro League	4	0	3 (Note: Appearances in the UAE League Cup)	2	0	0	0	0	7	2
Career total			4	0	3	2	0	0	0	0	7	2

== Honours ==
Calicut FC

- Super League Kerala: 2024
