= Đorđe Nikolić =

Serbian footballer

Personal information
- Date of birth: 13 April 1997 (age 29)
- Place of birth: Belgrade, FR Yugoslavia
- Height: 1.94 m (6 ft 4 in)
- Position: Goalkeeper

Team information
- Current team: Čukarički
- Number: 1

Youth career
- 2008–2012: Red Star Belgrade
- 2012–2014: Partizan

Senior career*
Years	Team	Apps	(Gls)
2015–2016	Jagodina	19	(0)
2016–2022	Basel	11	(0)
2017	→ Schaffhausen (loan)	17	(0)
2018	→ Thun (loan)	6	(0)
2018–2019	→ Aarau (loan)	33	(0)
2022–2024	Újpest	29	(0)
2024–2025	Sivasspor	16	(0)
2026–	Čukarički	5	(0)

International career
2012	Serbia U16	2	(0)
2013–2014	Serbia U17	10	(0)
2014	Serbia U18	4	(0)
2015	Serbia U19	6	(0)
2016–2017	Serbia U20	3	(0)
2016–2018	Serbia U21	2	(0)
2021	Serbia	1	(0)
- * Club domestic league appearances and goals as of 12 June 2026

Đorđe Nikolić (Serbian Cyrillic: Ђорђе Николић; born 13 April 1997) is a Serbian professional footballer who plays as a goalkeeper for Čukarički.

== Club career ==
=== Jagodina ===
After he left youth team of FK Partizan, Nikolić signed a three-year contract with Jagodina in the winter break off-season 2014–15. He made his Serbian SuperLiga debut for Jagodina in the first fixture of 2015–16 season. Although he started season as a first choice, Nikolić injured during the season and missed the great part of season. He made total 19 matches for club and after Jagodina relegated from the Serbian SuperLiga, Nikolić got an offer from FC Basel.

=== Basel ===
Nikolić signed four-year contract with FC Basel in June 2016. He made his debut for the club in 26 fixture match of the 2016–17 Swiss Super League season against FC St. Gallen, played on 1 April 2017. Under trainer Urs Fischer Nikolić won the Swiss Super League championship at the end of the 2016–17 Super League season. For the club this was the eighth title in a row and their 20th championship title in total. They also won the Swiss Cup for the twelfth time, which meant they had won the double for the sixth time in the club's history. In summer 2017, Nikolić moved on loan to the Swiss Challenge League side Schaffhausen, where he spent the rest of calendar year. Later, at the beginning of 2018, Nikolić moved to Thun on new loan, until summer 2019.

=== Sivasspor ===
On 26 January 2024, Nikolić signed a two-and-a-half-year contract with Sivasspor in Turkey.

== International career ==
Nikolić has been called in national team selections since 2012. In November 2016, Nikolić started playing with Serbian under-20 level as a first choice goalkeeper, until March 2017. After Boris Radunović's injury, coach Nenad Lalatović invited him to the squad for the 2017 UEFA European Under-21 Championship.

He made his debut for Serbia national football team on 7 June 2021 in a friendly against Jamaica.

== Career statistics ==
=== Club ===
As of 10 June 2018

Appearances and goals by club, season and competition
Club	Season	League			Cup		Continental		Other		Total	
Club	Season	Division	Apps	Goals	Apps	Goals	Apps	Goals	Apps	Goals	Apps	Goals
Jagodina	2014–15	Serbian SuperLiga	0	0	0	0	—		—		0	0
Jagodina	2015–16	Serbian SuperLiga	19	0	0	0	—		—		19	0
Jagodina	Total		19	0	0	0	—		—		19	0
Basel	2016–17	Swiss Super League	1	0	0	0	0	0	—		1	0
Schaffhausen (loan)	2017–18	Swiss Challenge League	17	0	0	0	—		—		17	0
Thun (loan)	2017–18	Swiss Super League	6	0	—		—		—		6	0
Career total			43	0	0	0	0	0	—		43	0

=== International ===
As of 7 June 2021

Serbia
Year	Apps	Goals
2021	1	0
Total	1	0

== Honours ==
Basel

- Swiss Super League: 2016–17
- Swiss Cup: 2016–17
