= Mohammed Marzooq =

Emirati footballer (born 1989)

Personal information
- Full name: Mohammed Marzooq Abdulaa Mohd Al-Matroushi
- Date of birth: 23 January 1989 (age 37)
- Place of birth: Dubai, United Arab Emirates
- Height: 1.76 m (5 ft 9 1/2 in)
- Position: Centre back

Youth career
- 2006–2009: Al Shabab

Senior career*
| Years | Team | Apps | (Gls) |
| 2009–2011 | Al Shabab | 0 | (0) |
| 2011 | Al Jazira | 3 | (0) |
| 2011–2017 | Al Shabab | 73 | (6) |
| 2017–2025 | Shabab Al-Ahli | 110 | (9) |

International career
| 2009 | United Arab Emirates U20 | 1 | (0) |
| 2015– | United Arab Emirates | 10 | (0) |
- * Club domestic league appearances and goals

Mohammed Marzooq Abdulaa Mohd Al-Matroushi (Arabic: محمد مرزوق; born 23 January 1989) is an Emirati footballer. He currently plays as a centre back.
