= Miloš Kosanović =

Serbian footballer

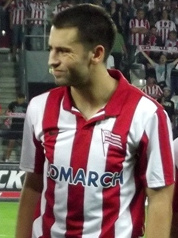
- Kosanović with Cracovia in 2012

Personal information
- Date of birth: 28 May 1990 (age 36)
- Place of birth: Čonoplja, SFR Yugoslavia
- Height: 1.91 m (6 ft 3 in)
- Position: Defender

Team information
- Current team: Spartak Subotica
- Number: 4

Youth career
- 1996–2000: Sloga Čonoplja
- 2000–2001: Radnički Sombor
- 2001–2007: Vojvodina

Senior career*
Years	Team	Apps	(Gls)
2007–2010	Mladost Apatin	48	(0)
2010–2013	Cracovia	83	(9)
2014–2015	Mechelen	73	(9)
2016–2019	Standard Liège	56	(3)
2017–2018	→ Göztepe (loan)	22	(0)
2019–2023	Al Jazira	76	(11)
2023	Újpest	9	(0)
2024–2025	Ajman	38	(8)
2025–2026	Železničar Pančevo	10	(1)
2026–	Spartak Subotica	9	(0)

International career
2012	Serbia U21	3	(0)
2015	Serbia	1	(0)
- * Club domestic league appearances and goals as of 16 September 2026

Miloš Kosanović (Serbian Cyrillic: Милош Косановић, pronounced [mǐloʃ kosǎːnoʋitɕ]; born 28 May 1990) is a Serbian professional footballer who plays as a defender for Spartak Subotica.

== Club career ==
He had played with Mladost Apatin in the Serbian First League between 2007 and 2010. In the summer 2010, he joined Polish club Cracovia on a four-year contract. In January 2016, he signed for Belgian club Standard Liège. In August 2019, Kosanović has signed a two-year contract with Emirati club Al Jazira.

== International career ==
Kosanović made his debut for Serbia national football team on 7 September 2015 in a friendly against France.

== Style of play ==
As free kick specialist, Kosanović scored eighth goals from a free kick in just over a year and a half for Al Jazira.

== Career statistics ==
=== Club ===
As of 27 May 2025

Club	Season	League	League		Cup		Other		Total	
Club	Season	League	Apps	Goals	Apps	Goals	Apps	Goals	Apps	Goals
Mladost Apatin	2007–08	Serbian First League	8	0	0	0	—		8	0
Mladost Apatin	2008–09	Serbian First League	12	0	0	0	—		12	0
Mladost Apatin	2009–10	Serbian First League	28	0	0	0	—		28	0
Mladost Apatin	Total		48	0	0	0	—		48	0
Cracovia	2010–11	Ekstraklasa	16	1	1	0	—		17	1
Cracovia	2011–12	Ekstraklasa	18	1	1	0	—		19	1
Cracovia	2012–13	I liga	29	1	2	1	—		31	2
Cracovia	2013–14	Ekstraklasa	20	6	1	0	—		21	6
Cracovia	Total		83	9	5	1	—		88	10
Mechelen	2013–14	Belgian Pro League	15	0	0	0	—		15	0
Mechelen	2014–15	Belgian Pro League	38	4	4	0	—		42	4
Mechelen	2015–16	Belgian Pro League	20	5	3	0	—		23	5
Mechelen	Total		73	9	7	0	—		80	9
Standard Liège	2015–16	Belgian Pro League	14	1	3	0	—		17	1
Standard Liège	2016–17	Belgian Pro League	17	1	0	0	0	0	17	1
Standard Liège	2017–18	Belgian Pro League	2	0	0	0	—		2	0
Standard Liège	2018–19	Belgian Pro League	20	1	1	0	1 (Note: Appearances in UEFA Europa League)	0	22	1
Standard Liège	2019–20	Belgian Pro League	3	0	0	0	—		3	0
Standard Liège	Total		56	3	4	0	1	0	61	3
Göztepe (loan)	2017–18	Süper Lig	22	0	1	0	—		23	0
Al Jazira	2019–20	UAE Pro League	19	0	4	2	—		23	2
Al Jazira	2020–21	UAE Pro League	24	6	2	1	—		26	7
Al Jazira	2021–22	UAE Pro League	19	5	4	1	2 (Note: Appearances in FIFA Club World Cup)	1	25	7
Al Jazira	2022–23	UAE Pro League	14	0	2	0	2 (Note: Appearances in UAE President's Cup)	0	18	0
Al Jazira	Total		76	11	12	4	4	1	92	16
Újpest	2023–24	Nemzeti Bajnokság I	9	0	1	0	—		10	0
Ajman	2023–24	UAE Pro League	12	0	0	0	2	0	14	0
Career total			379	32	30	5	7	1	416	38

=== International ===
National team	Year	Apps	Goals
Serbia	2015	1	0
Total		1	0

== Honours ==
Standard Liège

- Belgian Cup: 2015–16

Al Jazira

- UAE Pro League: 2020–21
- UAE Super Cup: 2021
