= Fujairah FC =

Emirati professional football club in Fujairah

Fujairah
- Full name: Fujairah Football Club
- Nicknames: The Wolves (الذئاب)
- Founded: 1968; 58 years ago
- Ground: Fujairah Club Stadium
- Capacity: 10,645
- Owner: Mohammed bin Hamad bin Mohammed Al Sharqi
- Manager: Blažo Bulatović
- League: UAE First Division League
- 2022–23: 9th
- Website: www.fujfc.ae
Home colours	Away colours

Fujairah Football Club (Arabic: نادي الفجيرة) is an Emirati professional football club based in Fujairah. Founded in 1968, the club competes in the UAE First Division League.

== Honours ==
- UAE First Division League
  - Winner (3): 1985–86, 1989–90, 2005–06

== Season-by-season record ==
Season	Lvl.	Tms.	Pos.	President's Cup	League Cup
2008–09	2	16	3rd	Round of 16	—
2009–10	2	8	4th	Preliminary Round	—
2010–11	2	8	5th	Preliminary Round	—
2011–12	2	8	6th	Preliminary Round	—
2012–13	2	14	4th	Round of 16	—
2013–14	2	13	2nd	Round of 16	—
2014–15	1	14	9th	Round of 16	First Round
2015–16	1	14	13th	Round of 16	First Round
2016–17	2	12	4th	Preliminary Round	—
2017–18	2	12	3rd	Quarter-Finals	—
2018–19	1	12	12th	Quarter-Finals	First Round
2019–20^{a}	1	14	14th	Round of 16	Quarter-Finals
2020–21	1	14	13th	Round of 16	Quarter-Finals
2021–22	2	15	7th	Preliminary Round	—
2022–23	2	17	9th	Round of 16	—

_{Notes 2019–20 UAE football season was cancelled due to the COVID-19 pandemic in the United Arab Emirates.}

== Current squad ==
As of 2023

Note: Flags indicate national team as defined under FIFA eligibility rules; some limited exceptions apply. Players may hold more than one non-FIFA nationality.

No.	Pos.	Nation	Player
1	GK	UAE	Ahmed Yaqoub
4	DF	GHA	Kweku Estine
5	DF	SRB	Novak Vukovic
6	MF	UAE	Nasser Salem
7	FW	FRA	Ervin Taha
8	MF	UAE	Abdelrahman Juma
9	FW	FRA	Sander Benbachir
11	FW	UAE	Abdulla Anwar
12	MF	UAE	Falah Waleed
14	MF	UAE	Saif Abdulla
15	MF	SEN	Ismaila Sonko
17	GK	UAE	Saleh Rabei
20	DF	UAE	Rashid Abdulla
21	DF	UAE	Mohammed Al-Maazmi
23	MF	UAE	Fahad Barout
25	DF	UAE	Mohammed Salem

No.	Pos.	Nation	Player
26	DF	UAE	Sultan Sabeel
27	MF	UAE	Ibrahim Al-Kendi
28	DF	SEN	Laye Diedhiou
29	FW	SEN	Mouhameth Diop
30	DF	ITA	Gabriel Santini
—	GK	UAE	Hamad Obaid
—	DF	UAE	Ahmed Mahmoud
—	DF	SRB	Petar Panic
—	DF	UAE	Adel Sabeel
—	DF	BRA	Rangel
—	DF	UAE	Sultan Fayez
—	MF	POL	Patryk Lipski
—	MF	GAM	Kajally Drammeh
—	FW	UAE	Mohammed Ali
—	FW	ITA	Rida Hannioui
—	FW	BRA	Samuel Rosa

== Managerial history ==
Name	Nat.	From	To	Ref.
Hassan Shehata	(Egypt)	July 2000	November 2000	
Ion Ion	(Romania)	2002	2003	
Abdulwahab Qadir	(Iraq)	2003	November 2005	
Miguel Ángel Basílico	(Argentina)	November 2005	May 2006	
Lotfi Benzarti	(Tunisia)	June 2006	December 2006	
Reinhard Fabisch	(Germany)	December 2006	May 2007	
Thair Jassam	(Iraq)	June 2007	December 2008	
Miguel Ángel Basílico	(Argentina)	December 2008	May 2009	
Sofiène Hidoussi	(Tunisia)	June 2009	October 2009	
Hilal Mohammed	(United Arab Emirates)	November 2009	February 2010	
Khaled Eid	(Egypt)	February 2010	September 2010	
Serge Devèze	(France)	October 2010	January 2011	
Mounir Chebil	(Tunisia)	January 2011	February 2011	
Thair Jassam	(Iraq)	February 2011	June 2011	
Sérgio Alexandre	(Brazil)	June 2011	December 2011	
Džemal Hadžiabdić	(Bosnia and Herzegovina)	January 2012	May 2012	
Hatem Souissi	(Tunisia)	June 2012	August 2012	
Paulo Campos	(Brazil)	August 2012	January 2013	
Khamis Rabie	(United Arab Emirates)	January 2013	May 2013	
Stefano Cusin	(Italy)	May 2013	October 2013	
Džemal Hadžiabdić	(Bosnia and Herzegovina)	October 2013	September 2014	
Abdulwahab Qadir	(Iraq)	September 2014	December 2014	
Ivan Hašek	(Czech Republic)	December 2014	March 2016	
Eid Baroot	(United Arab Emirates)	March 2016	October 2016	
Džemal Hadžiabdić	(Bosnia and Herzegovina)	November 2016	April 2017	
Tarek Mostafa	(Egypt)	April 2017	May 2017	
Diego Maradona	(Argentina)	May 2017	April 2018	
Abdullah Mesfer	(United Arab Emirates)	May 2018	May 2018	
Ivan Hašek	(Czech Republic)	May 2018	February 2019	
Abdullah Mesfer	(United Arab Emirates)	February 2019	May 2019	
Madjid Bougherra	(Algeria)	June 2019	February 2020	
Fabio Viviani	(Italy)	February 2020	June 2020	
Goran Tufegdžić	(Serbia)	July 2020	February 2021	
Nacif Beyaoui	(Tunisia)	February 2021	May 2021	
Mohammed Al-Timoumi	(United Arab Emirates)	June 2021	May 2022	
Sofiane Nechma	(Algeria)	July 2022	November 2022	
Mohammed Al Hosani	(United Arab Emirates)	November 2022	October 2023	
Željko Markov	(Serbia)	October 2023	present	

== See also ==
- List of football clubs in the United Arab Emirates
