= Hungary national football team results (2020–present) =

This article provides details of international football games played by the Hungary national football team from 2020 to present.

== Results ==
Key
Win
Draw
Defeat

=== 2020 ===
3 September 2020 2020–21 Nations League	Turkey	0–1	Hungary	Sivas, Turkey
21:45 UTC+3		Report	Szoboszlai 80'	Stadium: New Sivas 4 Eylül Stadium; Attendance: 0 (Note: Due to the COVID-19 pandemic in Europe, all matches scheduled for September 2020 were played behind closed doors.); Referee: Artur Soares Dias (Portugal)

6 September 2020 2020–21 Nations League	Hungary	2–3	Russia	Budapest, Hungary
18:00 UTC+2	Sallai 62'; Nikolić 70'	Report	Miranchuk 15'; Ozdoyev 34'; Fernandes 46'	Stadium: Puskás Aréna; Attendance: 0 Referee: Maurizio Mariani (Italy)

8 October 2020 UEFA Euro 2020 qualifying play-offs	Bulgaria	1–3	Hungary	Sofia, Bulgaria
21:45 UTC+3	Yomov 89'	Report	Orbán 17'; Kalmár 47'; Nikolić 75'	Stadium: Vasil Levski National Stadium; Attendance: 1,929; Referee: Szymon Marciniak (Poland)

11 October 2020 2020–21 Nations League	Serbia	0–1	Hungary	Belgrade, Serbia
20:45 UTC+2		Report	Könyves 20'	Stadium: Red Star Stadium; Attendance: 0 (Note: Due to the COVID-19 pandemic in Europe, the match was played behind closed doors.); Referee: Sandro Schärer (Switzerland)

14 October 2020 2020–21 Nations League	Russia	0–0	Hungary	Moscow, Russia
21:45 UTC+3		Report		Stadium: VTB Arena; Attendance: 5,019; Referee: Michael Oliver (England)

12 November 2020 UEFA Euro 2020 qualifying play-offs	Hungary	2–1	Iceland	Budapest, Hungary
20:45 UTC+1	Négo 88'; Szoboszlai 90+2'	Report	G. Sigurðsson 52'	Stadium: Puskás Aréna; Attendance: 0 (Note: The Hungary v Iceland match was played behind closed doors due to the COVID-19 pandemic in Hungary.); Referee: Björn Kuipers (Netherlands)

15 November 2020 2020–21 Nations League	Hungary	1–1	Serbia	Budapest, Hungary
20:45 UTC+1	Kalmár 39'	Report	Radonjić 17'	Stadium: Puskás Aréna; Attendance: 0 Referee: Glenn Nyberg (Sweden)

18 November 2020 2020–21 Nations League	Hungary	2–0	Turkey	Budapest, Hungary
20:45 UTC+1	Sigér 57'; Varga 90+5'	Report		Stadium: Puskás Aréna; Attendance: 0 Referee: Ivan Kružliak (Slovakia)

=== 2021 ===
25 March 2021 2022 World Cup qualifying	Hungary	3–3	Poland	Budapest, Hungary
20:45 UTC+1	Fiola (yellow card) 8' (yellow-red card) 90+4'; Sallai 6'; Szalai 53'; Orbán 78'	Report	Piątek 60'; Jóźwiak 61'; Lewandowski 83'	Stadium: Puskás Aréna; Attendance: 0 Referee: Felix Brych (Germany)

28 March 2021 2022 World Cup qualifying	San Marino	0–3	Hungary	Serravalle, San Marino
20:45 UTC+2		Report	Szalai 13' (pen.); Sallai 71'; Nikolić 88' (pen.)	Stadium: San Marino Stadium; Attendance: 0 Referee: Nicholas Walsh (Scotland)

31 March 2021 2022 World Cup qualifying	Andorra	1–4	Hungary	Andorra la Vella, Andorra
20:45 UTC+2	Pujol 90+2' (pen.)	Report	Fiola 45+2'; Gazdag 51'; Kleinheisler 58'; Négo 90'	Stadium: Estadi Nacional; Attendance: 0 Referee: Vilhjálmur Þórarinsson (Iceland)

4 June 2021 Friendly	Hungary	1–0	Cyprus	Budapest, Hungary
20:00 UTC+2	Schäfer 36'	Report		Stadium: Szusza Ferenc Stadion; Attendance: 7,500; Referee: Matej Jug (Slovenia)

8 June 2021 Friendly	Hungary	0–0	Republic of Ireland	Budapest, Hungary
20:00 UTC+2		Report		Stadium: Szusza Ferenc Stadion; Attendance: 0 Referee: Daniel Stefański (Poland)

15 June 2021 Euro 2020 Group F	Hungary	0–3	Portugal	Budapest, Hungary
18:00 UTC+2		Report	Guerreiro 84'; Ronaldo 87' (pen.), 90+2'	Stadium: Puskás Aréna; Attendance: 55,662; Referee: Cüneyt Çakır (Turkey)

19 June 2021 Euro 2020 Group F	Hungary	1–1	France	Budapest, Hungary
15:00 UTC+2	Fiola 45+2'	Report	Griezmann 66'	Stadium: Puskás Aréna; Attendance: 55,998; Referee: Michael Oliver (England)

23 June 2021 Euro 2020 Group F	Germany	2–2	Hungary	Munich, Germany
21:00 UTC+2	Havertz 66'; Goretzka 84'	Report	Ád. Szalai 11'; Schäfer 68'	Stadium: Allianz Arena; Attendance: 12,413; Referee: Sergei Karasev (Russia)

2 September 2021 2022 World Cup qualifying	Hungary	0–4	England	Budapest, Hungary
20:45 UTC+2		Report	Sterling 55'; Kane 63'; Maguire 69'; Rice 87'	Stadium: Puskás Aréna; Attendance: 58,260; Referee: Cüneyt Çakır (Turkey)

5 September 2021 2022 World Cup qualifying	Albania	1–0	Hungary	Elbasan, Albania
18:00 UTC+2	Broja 87'	Report		Stadium: Elbasan Arena; Attendance: 4,135; Referee: Danny Makkelie (Netherlands)

8 September 2021 2022 World Cup qualifying	Hungary	2–1	Andorra	Budapest, Hungary
20:45 UTC+2	Ád. Szalai 9' (pen.); Botka 18'	Report	Llovera 82'	Stadium: Puskás Aréna; Attendance: 46,240; Referee: Rade Obrenovič (Slovenia)

9 October 2021 2022 World Cup qualifying	Hungary	0–1	Albania	Budapest, Hungary
20:45 UTC+2		Report	Broja 80'	Stadium: Puskás Aréna; Attendance: 0 (Note: The match was played behind closed doors.); Referee: Carlos del Cerro Grande (Spain)

12 October 2021 2022 World Cup qualifying	England	1–1	Hungary	London, England
19:45 UTC+1	Stones 37'	Report	Sallai 24' (pen.)	Stadium: Wembley Stadium; Attendance: 69,380; Referee: Alejandro Hernández (Spain)

12 November 2021 2022 World Cup qualifying	Hungary	4–0	San Marino	Budapest, Hungary
20:45 UTC+2	Szoboszlai 6', 83'; Gazdag 22'; Vécsei 88'	Report		Stadium: Puskás Aréna; Attendance: 12,800; Referee: Filip Glova (Slovakia)

15 November 2021 2022 World Cup qualifying	Poland	1–2	Hungary	Warsaw, Poland
20:45 UTC+2	Świderski 61'	Report	Schäfer 37'; Gazdag 80'	Stadium: PGE Narodowy; Attendance: 56,197; Referee: Tiago Martins (Portugal)

=== 2022 ===
24 March 2022 Friendly	Hungary	0–1	Serbia	Budapest, Hungary
19:30		Report	Nagy 35' (o.g.)	Stadium: Puskás Aréna; Attendance: 30,000; Referee: Filip Glova (Slovakia)

29 March 2022 Friendly	Northern Ireland	0–1	Hungary	Belfast, Northern Ireland
19:45		Report	Sallai 55'	Stadium: Windsor Park; Attendance: 18,000; Referee: Robert Harvey (Ireland)

4 June 2022 2022–23 Nations League	Hungary	1–0	England	Budapest, Hungary
18:00	Szoboszlai 66' (pen.)	Report		Stadium: Puskás Aréna; Attendance: 26,935; Referee: Artur Dias (Portugal)

7 June 2022 2022–23 Nations League	Italy	2–1	Hungary	Cesena, Italy
20:45	Barella 30'; Pellegrini 45'	Report	Mancini 61' (o.g.)	Stadium: Stadio Dino Manuzzi; Attendance: 14,942; Referee: Sandro Schärer (Switzerland)

11 June 2022 2022–23 Nations League	Hungary	1–1	Germany	Budapest, Hungary
20:45	Zs. Nagy 6'	Report	Hofmann 9'	Stadium: Puskás Aréna; Attendance: 55,948; Referee: José María Sánchez Martínez (Spain)

14 June 2022 2022–23 Nations League	England	0–4	Hungary	Wolverhampton, England
19:45		Report	Sallai 16', 70'; Zs. Nagy 80'; Gazdag 89'	Stadium: Molineux Stadium; Attendance: 28,839; Referee: Clément Turpin (France)

23 September 2022 2022–23 Nations League	Germany	0–1	Hungary	Leipzig, Germany
20:45		Report	Á. Szalai 17'	Stadium: Red Bull Arena; Attendance: 39,513; Referee: Slavko Vinčić (Slovenia)

26 September 2022 2022–23 Nations League	Hungary	0–2	Italy	Budapest, Hungary
20:45		Report	Raspadori 27'; Dimarco 52'	Stadium: Puskás Aréna; Attendance: 57,300; Referee: Benoît Bastien (France)

17 November 2022 Friendly	Luxembourg	2–2	Hungary	Luxembourg City, Luxembourg
20:00	G. Rodrigues 7' (pen.); Curci 77'	Report	A. Szalai 25'; A. Németh 67'	Stadium: Stade de Luxembourg; Attendance: 3,571; Referee: Jonathan Lardot (Belgium)

20 November 2022 Friendly	Hungary	2–1	Greece	Budapest, Hungary
20:15	Sallai 15'; Kalmár 90+3'	Report	Bakasetas 81' (pen.)	Stadium: Puskás Aréna; Attendance: 50,983; Referee: Daniele Chiffi (Italy)

=== 2023 ===
23 March 2023 Friendly	Hungary	1–0	Estonia	Budapest, Hungary
19:30 UTC+1	Ádám 41'	Report		Stadium: Puskás Aréna; Attendance: 41,000; Referee: Walter Altmann (Austria)

27 March 2023 UEFA Euro 2024 qualifying	Hungary	3–0	Bulgaria	Budapest, Hungary
20:45 UTC+1	Vécsei 7'; Szoboszlai 26'; Ádám 39'	Report		Stadium: Puskás Aréna; Attendance: 53,000; Referee: Halil Umut Meler (Turkey)

17 June 2023 UEFA Euro 2024 qualifying	Montenegro	0–0	Hungary	Podgorica, Montenegro
18:00 UTC+2		Report		Stadium: City Stadium; Attendance: 6,761; Referee: Jesús Gil Manzano (Spain)

20 June 2023 UEFA Euro 2024 qualifying	Hungary	2–0	Lithuania	Budapest, Hungary
20:45 UTC+2	Varga 32'; Sallai 83'	Report		Stadium: Puskás Aréna; Attendance: 58,274; Referee: António Nobre (Portugal)

7 September 2023 UEFA Euro 2024 qualifying	Serbia	1–2	Hungary	Belgrade, Serbia
20:45 UTC+2	A. Szalai 10' (o.g.)	Report	Varga 34'; Orbán 36'	Stadium: Stadion Rajko Mitić; Attendance: 6,924; Referee: Juan Martínez Munuera (Spain)

10 September 2023 Friendly	Hungary	1–1	Czech Republic	Budapest, Hungary
18:00 UTC+2	Sallai 52'	Report	Jurečka 63'	Stadium: Puskás Aréna; Attendance: 54,444; Referee: Igor Pajač (Croatia)

14 October 2023 UEFA Euro 2024 qualifying	Hungary	2–1	Serbia	Budapest, Hungary
20:45 UTC+2	Varga 20'; Sallai 34'	Report	Pavlović 33'	Stadium: Puskás Aréna; Attendance: 58,215; Referee: François Letexier (France)

17 October 2023 UEFA Euro 2024 qualifying	Lithuania	2–2	Hungary	Kaunas, Lithuania
21:45 UTC+3	Černych 20'; Širvys 36'	Report	Szoboszlai 67' (pen.); Varga 82'	Stadium: Darius and Girėnas Stadium; Attendance: 5,349; Referee: Juxhin Xhaja (Albania)

16 November 2023 UEFA Euro 2024 qualifying	Bulgaria	2–2	Hungary	Sofia, Bulgaria
19:00 UTC+2	Delev 24'; Despodov 79' (pen.)	Report	Ádám 10'; Petkov 90+7' (o.g.)	Stadium: Vasil Levski National Stadium; Attendance: 0 Referee: Daniel Stefanski (Poland)

19 November 2023 UEFA Euro 2024 qualifying	Hungary	3–1	Montenegro	Budapest, Hungary
15:00 UTC+2	Szoboszlai 66', 68'; Nagy 90+3'	Report	Rubežić 36'	Stadium: Puskás Aréna; Attendance: 59,600; Referee: Danny Makkelie (Netherlands)

=== 2024 ===
22 March 2024 Friendly	Hungary	1–0	Turkey	Budapest, Hungary
20:45 UTC+1	Szoboszlai 48' (pen.)	Report		Stadium: Puskás Aréna; Attendance: 58,000; Referee: Bartosz Frankowski (Poland)

26 March 2024 Friendly	Hungary	2–0	Kosovo	Budapest, Hungary
19:00 UTC+1	Szoboszlai 58'; Zs. Nagy 86'	Report		Stadium: Puskás Aréna; Attendance: 56,000; Referee: Ovidiu Haţegan (Romania)

4 June 2024 Friendly	Republic of Ireland	2–1	Hungary	Dublin, Ireland
20:45 UTC+1	Idah 36'; Parrott 90+2'	Report	Lang 40'	Stadium: Aviva Stadium; Attendance: 29,424; Referee: Luís Godinho (Portugal)

8 June 2024 Friendly	Hungary	3–0	Israel	Debrecen, Hungary
18:00	Sallai 11'; Varga 19', 22'	Report		Stadium: Nagyerdei Stadion; Attendance: 19,900; Referee: Cláudio Pereira (Portugal)

15 June 2024 UEFA Euro 2024 Group A	Hungary	1–3	Switzerland	Cologne, Germany
15:00 UTC+2	Varga 66'	Report	Duah 12'; Aebischer 45'; Embolo 90+3'	Stadium: RheinEnergieStadion; Attendance: 41,676; Referee: Slavko Vinčić (Slovenia)

19 June 2024 UEFA Euro 2024 Group A	Germany	2–0	Hungary	Stuttgart, Germany
18:00 UTC+2	Musiala 22'; Gündoğan 67'	Report		Stadium: MHPArena; Attendance: 54,000; Referee: Danny Makkelie (Netherlands)

23 June 2024 UEFA Euro 2024 Group A	Scotland	0–1	Hungary	Stuttgart, Germany
21:00 UTC+2		Report	Csoboth 90+10'	Stadium: MHPArena; Attendance: 54,000; Referee: Facundo Tello (Argentina)

7 September 2024 2024–25 Nations League	Germany	5–0	Hungary	Düsseldorf, Germany
20:45 CEST (UTC+02:00)	Füllkrug 27'; Musiala 58'; Wirtz 66'; Pavlović 77'; Havertz 81' (pen.)	Report		Stadium: Merkur Spiel-Arena; Attendance: 49,235; Referee: Clément Turpin (France)

10 September 2024 2024–25 Nations League	Hungary	0–0	Bosnia and Herzegovina	Budapest, Hungary
20:45 CEST (UTC+02:00)		Report		Stadium: Puskás Aréna; Attendance: 46,443; Referee: Marco Guida (Italy)

11 October 2024 2024–25 Nations League	Hungary	1–1	Netherlands	Budapest, Hungary
20:45 CEST (UTC+02:00)	Sallai 32'	Report	Dumfries 83'; van Dijk (yellow card) 77' (yellow-red card) 79'	Stadium: Puskás Aréna; Attendance: 55,300; Referee: Lukas Fähndrich (Switzerland)

14 October 2024 2024–25 Nations League	Bosnia and Herzegovina	0–2	Hungary	Zenica, Bosnia and Herzegovina
20:45 CEST (UTC+02:00)		Report	Szoboszlai 38', 50' (pen.)	Stadium: Bilino Polje Stadium; Attendance: 8,329; Referee: Anthony Taylor (England)

16 November 2024 2024–25 Nations League	Netherlands	4–0	Hungary	Amsterdam, Netherlands
20:45 CEST (UTC+01:00)	Weghorst 21' (pen.); Gakpo 45+12' (pen.); Dumfries 64'; Koopmeiners 85'	Report		Stadium: Johan Cruyff Arena; Attendance: 51,611; Referee: Jesús Gil Manzano (Spain)

19 November 2024 2024–25 Nations League	Hungary	1–1	Germany	Budapest, Hungary
20:45 CEST (UTC+01:00)	Szoboszlai 90+9' (pen.)	Report	Nmecha 76'	Stadium: Puskás Aréna; Attendance: 53,212; Referee: Duje Strukan (Croatia)

=== 2025 ===
20 March 2025 2024–25 Nations League Relegation play-off	Turkey	3–1	Hungary	Istanbul, Turkey
18:00 CET (20:00 TRT (UTC+03:00))	Kökçü 9' (yellow card) 41'; Aktürkoğlu 69'; Can Kahveci 75'	Report	Schäfer (yellow card) 19' (goal) 25'; Zs. Nagy (yellow card) 64'; Kata (yellow card) 77'	Stadium: Rams Park; Attendance: 38,500; Referee: Ivan Kružliak (Slovakia)

23 March 2025 2024–25 Nations League Relegation play-off	Hungary	0–3 (1–6 agg.)	Turkey	Budapest, Hungary
18:00 CET (UTC+01:00)	M. Dárdai (yellow card) 52'; Orbán (yellow card) 59'; B. Varga (yellow card) 73'	Report	Çalhanoğlu 37' (pen.); Güler 39'; Bardakcı (yellow card) 72' (goal) 90'	Stadium: Puskás Aréna; Attendance: 57,861; Referee: Felix Zwayer (Germany)

6 June 2025 Friendly	Hungary	0–2	Sweden	Budapest, Hungary
19:30 CEST (UTC+02:00)	Zs. Nagy (yellow card) 48'	Report	Ayari (yellow card) 37' (goal) 65'; Sema (yellow card) 40'; Nygren 49'; Ekdal (yellow card) 80'	Stadium: Puskás Aréna; Attendance: 55,000; Referee: Atilla Karaoglan (Turkish)

10 June 2025 Friendly	Azerbaijan	1–2	Hungary	Baku, Azerbaijan
18:00 CET (20:00 AZT (UTC+04:00))	Dadaşov 7'; Makhmudov (yellow card) 54'; T. Bayramov (yellow card) 60'; A. Hüseynov (yellow card) 76'; Kh. Aliyev (yellow card) 84'; Rustamli (yellow card) 90+6'	Report	B. Varga 5'; Szoboszlai 33'; Schäfer (yellow card) 84'	Stadium: Dalga Arena; Attendance: 1,200; Referee: Viktor Shimusik (Belarus)

6 September 2025 2026 World Cup qualifying	Republic of Ireland	2–2	Hungary	Dublin, Ireland
20:45 CET (19:45 BST (UTC+01:00))	Ferguson (yellow card) 42' (goal) 49'; Cullen (yellow card) 54'; Collins (yellow card) 90'; Idah 90+3'	Report (FIFA); Report (UEFA)	B. Varga 2' (yellow card) 79'; Sallai 15' (red card) 52'; Szoboszlai (yellow card) 30'; A. Szalai (yellow card) 48'; Dibusz (yellow card) 60'; B. Tóth (yellow card) 85'	Stadium: Aviva Stadium; Attendance: 51,137; Referee: Harm Osmers (Germany)

9 September 2025 2026 World Cup qualifying	Hungary	2–3	Portugal	Budapest, Hungary
20:45 CEST (UTC+02:00)	B. Varga 21', 84' (yellow card) 57'	Report (FIFA); Report (UEFA)	Silva 36'; Ronaldo 58' (pen.); Neves (yellow card) 77'; Cancelo 86'; Palhinha (yellow card) 90+6'	Stadium: Puskás Aréna; Attendance: 61,473; Referee: Erik Lambrechts (Belgium)

11 October 2025 2026 World Cup qualifying	Hungary	2–0	Armenia	Budapest, Hungary
18:00 CEST (UTC+02:00)	Lukács 56'; Gruber 90+4'	Report (FIFA); Report (UEFA)	Arutyunyan (yellow card) 14'	Stadium: Puskás Aréna; Attendance: 57,285; Referee: Chris Kavanagh (England)

14 October 2025 2026 World Cup qualifying	Portugal	2–2	Hungary	Lisbon, Portugal
20:45 CEST (19:45 WEST (UTC+01:00))	Ronaldo 22', 45+3'; Fernandes (yellow card) 34'; João Félix (yellow card) 90'	Report (FIFA); Report (UEFA)	Szalai 8'; Styles (yellow card) 50'; Szoboszlai 90+1'; Lukács (yellow card) 90+5'	Stadium: Estádio José Alvalade; Attendance: 47,854; Referee: Srđan Jovanović (Serbia)

13 November 2025 2026 World Cup qualifying	Armenia	0–1	Hungary	Yerevan, Armenia
18:00 CEST (21:00 AMT (UTC+04:00))	Ranos (yellow card) 52'	Report	B. Varga 33'; Schäfer (yellow card) 83'	Stadium: Vazgen Sargsyan Republican Stadium; Attendance: 14,247; Referee: José María Sánchez (Spain)

16 November 2025 2026 World Cup qualifying	Hungary	2–3	Republic of Ireland	Budapest, Hungary
15:00 CET (UTC+01:00)	Lukács 4'; Varga 37' (yellow card) 90+5'; A. Szalai (yellow card) 45+2'	Report	Parrott 15' (pen.), 80', 90+6' (yellow card) 90+6'; Scales (yellow card) 68'; Cullen (yellow card) 78'; Festy (yellow card) 89'	Stadium: Puskás Aréna; Attendance: 59,411; Referee: Espen Eskås (Norway)

=== 2026 ===
28 March 2026 Friendly	Hungary	1–0	Slovenia	Budapest, Hungary
18:00 UTC+1	M. Dárdai (yellow card) 69'; Schön 79'	Report	Čerin (yellow card) 38'; Ratnik (yellow card) 53'; Zec (yellow card) 71'	Stadium: Puskás Aréna; Attendance: 50,252; Referee: Rohit Saggi (Norway)

31 March 2026 Friendly	Hungary	0–0	Greece	Budapest, Hungary
19:00 UTC+2	Osváth (yellow card) 63'	Report	Koulierakis (yellow card) 48'; Rota (yellow card) 90+1'	Stadium: Puskás Aréna; Attendance: 54,849; Referee: Florian Badstübner (German)

5 June 2026 Friendly	Hungary	2–1	Finland	Budapest, Hungary
19:45 UTC+2	Osváth (yellow card) 4'; B. Varga 25', 43'; K. Szűcs (yellow card) 85'	Report (UEFA)	Suhonen (yellow card) 36'; T. Miettinen 71'	Stadium: Puskás Aréna; Attendance: 53,148; Referee: Ante Čulina (Croatian)

9 June 2026 Friendly	Hungary	3–1	Kazakhstan	Debrecen, Hungary
19:00 UTC+2	Szoboszlai 52'; Schäfer 67'; T. Szűcs (yellow card) 74'; R. Tóth 90+3'; Markgráf (yellow card) 90+5'	Report (UEFA)	Malyi 9' (yellow card) 90+5'; Kenzhebek (yellow card) 17'; Samorodov (yellow card) 28' (yellow-red card) 63'; Satpayev (yellow card) 33'; Orazov (yellow card) 40'; Kuat (yellow card) 45+2'	Stadium: Nagyerdei Stadion; Attendance: 19,595; Referee: Pavle Ilić (Serbia)

25 September 2026 2026–27 Nations League	Hungary	0–1	Ukraine	Budapest, Hungary
18:45 UTC+2	Schäfer (yellow card) 5'; Bárány (yellow card) 83'; Szoboszlai (yellow card) 90+4'; Kerkez (yellow card) 90+4'	Report (UEFA)	Brazhko (yellow card) 21'; Sikan 42'; Krupskyi (yellow card) 49'; Nazarenko (yellow card) 71' (yellow-red card) 90+2'; Tsukanov (yellow card) 90+4'; Matviyenko (yellow card) 90+4'	Stadium: Puskás Aréna; Attendance: 56,796; Referee: Jarred Gillett (England); Assistant referees: Neil Davies, Nick Greenhalgh

28 September 2026 2026–27 Nations League	Northern Ireland	0–0	Hungary	Belfast, Northern Ireland
20:45 (19:45 UTC+1)		Report (UEFA)		Stadium: Windsor Park; Attendance: 18,082; Referee: Ricardo de Burgos Bengoetxea (Spain)

2 October 2026 2026–27 Nations League	Hungary	1–0	Georgia	Budapest, Hungary
20:45 CEST	Kerkez 35' (yellow card) 74'; T. Szűcs (yellow card) 82'; Vitális (yellow card) 85'	Report (UEFA)	Kiteishvili (yellow card) 33'; Kochorashvili (yellow card) 67'	Stadium: Puskás Aréna; Attendance: 52,780; Referee: Srđan Jovanović (Serbia)

5 October 2026 2026–27 Nations League	Ukraine	1–2	Hungary	Trnava, Slovakia (Note: Due to the Russian invasion of Ukraine, Ukraine are required to play their home matches at neutral venues until further notice.)
20:45 (21:45 UTC+3)	Nazaryna (yellow card) 20'; Yaremchuk 83'	Report (UEFA)	M. Tóth 52'; Lukács (yellow card) 55'; R. Tóth (yellow card) 78'; Csinger 85'	Stadium: Anton Malatinský Stadium; Attendance: 7,910; Referee: Igor Pajač (Croatia)

14 November 2026 2026–27 Nations League	Georgia	0–2	Hungary	Tbilisi, Georgia
18:00 (21:00 UTC+4)	Tsitaishvili (yellow card) 60'	Report (UEFA)	Orbán (yellow card) 19'; Vitális (yellow card) 51'; Dvali 73' (o.g.); B. Varga 85'	Stadium: Mikheil Meskhi Stadium; Attendance: 19,187; Referee: Ondřej Berka (Czech Republic)

17 November 2026 2026–27 Nations League	Hungary	1–1	Northern Ireland	Budapest, Hungary
20:45 CEST	B. Varga 35'	Report (UEFA)	Devenny 65'	Stadium: Puskás Aréna; Attendance: 55,306; Referee: Marco Guida (Italy)

== Head to head records ==
As of match played 17 November 2026 after Hungary vs. Northern Ireland (home)

Head to head records
Opponent	Pld	W	D	L	GF	GA	W%	D%	L%
Albania	7	5	1	2	19	2	71.43	14.29	28.57
Algeria	3	3	0	0	13	1	100	0	0
Andorra	6	5	0	1	17	3	83.33	0	16.67
Antigua and Barbuda	1	1	0	0	3	0	100	0	100
Argentina	8	1	1	6	6	18	12.5	12.5	75
Armenia	3	3	0	0	5	0	100	0	0
Asia XI	2	2	0	0	5	0	100	0	0
Australia	3	0	0	3	2	8	0	0	100
Austria	137	67	30	40	299	252	48.91	21.9	29.2
Azerbaijan	8	8	0	0	21	3	100	0	0
Belarus	3	0	2	1	4	7	0	66.67	33.33
Belgium	11	2	2	9	16	31	18.18	18.18	81.82
Bolivia	2	2	0	0	9	2	100	0	0
Bosnia and Herzegovina	6	3	3	0	8	4	50	50	0
Brazil	6	3	1	2	14	12	50	16.67	33.33
Bulgaria	28	14	7	7	66	33	50	25	25
Canada	3	2	1	0	4	1	66.67	33.33	0
China	4	1	1	2	3	4	25	25	50
Chile	4	1	1	2	7	11	25	25	50
Colombia	1	1	0	0	3	1	100	0	0
Costa Rica	1	1	0	0	1	0	100	0	0
Croatia	12	2	6	4	10	19	16.67	50	33.33
Cyprus	8	7	0	1	14	5	87.5	0	12.5
Czech Republic + Czechoslovakia	39	19	10	10	84	64	48.72	25.64	25.64
Denmark	16	8	4	4	38	17	50	25	25
Ecuador	1	0	0	1	0	1	0	0	100
Egypt	9	5	1	3	16	7	55.56	11.11	33.33
El Salvador	4	3	1	0	16	4	75	25	0
England	26	7	3	16	36	61	26.92	11.54	61.54
Estonia	9	6	2	1	22	9	66.67	22.22	11.11
Faroe Islands	4	3	1	0	4	1	75	25	0
Finland	20	14	3	3	53	16	70	15	15
France	24	12	4	8	50	34	50	16.67	33.33
Georgia	4	3	0	1	8	4	75	0	25
Germany	40	12	13	15	69	82	30	32.5	37.5
Greece	24	7	7	10	41	35	29.17	29.17	41.67
Guatemala	2	1	1	0	2	0	50	50	0
Honduras	1	0	1	0	0	0	0	100	0
Iceland	12	8	1	3	24	12	66.67	8.33	25
India	2	2	0	0	3	1	100	0	0
Iran	4	4	0	0	11	1	100	0	0
Iraq	0	0	0	1	0	2	0	0	100
Israel	6	2	2	2	6	5	33.33	33.33	33.33
Italy	36	9	9	18	57	67	25	25	50
Ivory Coast	2	1	1	0	4	1	50	50	0
Japan	2	2	0	0	4	2	100	0	0
Jordan	1	0	1	0	1	1	0	100	0
Kazakhstan	3	2	0	1	8	4	66.67	0	33.33
South Korea	3	2	0	1	10	3	66.67	0	33.33
Kosovo	1	1	0	0	2	0	50	0	0
Kuwait	2	2	0	0	2	0	100	0	0
Latvia	8	6	0	2	16	10	75	0	25
Lebanon	1	1	0	0	4	1	100	0	0
Liechtenstein	3	2	1	0	50	14	66.67	33.33	0
Lithuania	8	6	2	0	21	4	75	25	0
Luxembourg	12	10	1	1	2	2	83.33	8.33	8.33
Malaysia	1	1	0	0	2	0	100	0	0
Malta	12	9	2	1	28	6	75	16.67	8.33
Mexico	12	2	1	9	10	24	16.67	8.33	75
Montenegro	5	1	2	2	8	8	20	40	40
Moldova	7	4	2	1	10	6	57.14	28.57	14.29
Morocco	3	3	0	0	7	2	100	0	0
Moscow XI	2	1	1	0	2	3	50	50	0
Netherlands	19	5	3	11	30	50	26.32	15.79	57.89
New Zealand	3	3	0	0	6	2	100	0	0
North Macedonia	3	3	0	0	6	0	100	0	0
Northern Ireland	9	5	3	1	10	5	55.56	33.33	11.11
Norway	22	9	6	7	38	27	40.91	27.27	31.82
Paraguay	1	0	1	0	1	1	0	100	0
Peru	2	0	0	2	3	5	0	0	0
Poland	35	21	6	8	90	48	60	17.14	22.86
Portugal	16	0	5	11	14	38	0	31.25	68.75
Qatar	3	2	1	0	8	2	66.67	33.33	0
Republic of Ireland	16	5	7	4	30	25	31.25	43.75	25
Romania	24	11	5	8	48	26	45.83	20.83	33.33
Russia (Note: Record against Soviet Unin included.)	21	6	9	10	46	50	28.57	42.86	47.62
San Marino	6	6	0	0	26	0	100	0	0
Saudi Arabia	2	0	2	0	2	2	0	100	0
Scotland	10	5	2	3	19	18	50	20	30
Senegal	2	2	0	0	11	3	100	0	0
Serbia (Note: Record against Yugoslavia included.)	32	15	9	8	58	54	46.88	28.13	25
Slovakia	6	0	2	4	2	7	0	33.33	66.67
Slovenia	5	2	0	3	4	5	40	0	60
Spain	13	3	5	5	18	21	23.08	38.46	38.46
Sweden	47	18	11	18	90	81	38.3	23.4	38.3
Switzerland	47	30	5	12	69	30	63.83	10.64	25.53
Tunisia	4	3	1	0	16	3	75	25	0
Turkey	19	11	2	6	36	23	57.89	10.53	31.58
Ukraine	4	3	0	1	7	4	75	0	25
United Arab Emirates	2	2	0	0	6	1	100	0	0
Uruguay	5	1	2	2	7	8	20	40	40
United States	3	1	1	1	2	2	33.33	33.33	33.33
Uzbekistan	1	1	0	0	3	2	100	0	0
Wales	12	4	2	6	15	17	33.33	16.67	50
Zambia	1	1	0	0	4	1	100	0	0
Totals	1,033	499	222	312	2,005	1,495	48.31	21.49	30.2
