= 2022 FIFA World Cup qualification – UEFA Group I =

The 2022 FIFA World Cup qualification UEFA Group I was one of the ten UEFA groups in the World Cup qualification tournament to decide which teams would qualify for the 2022 FIFA World Cup tournament in Qatar. Group I consisted of six teams: Albania, Andorra, England, Hungary, Poland and San Marino. The teams played against each other home-and-away in a round-robin format.

The group winners, England, qualified directly for the World Cup finals, while the runners-up, Poland, advanced to the second round (play-offs).

== Standings ==
Pos	Team	Pld	W	D	L	GF	GA	GD	Pts	Qualification	England	Poland	Albania	Hungary	Andorra	San Marino
1	England	10	8	2	0	39	3	+36	26	Qualification for 2022 FIFA World Cup	—	2–1	5–0	1–1	4–0	5–0
2	Poland	10	6	2	2	30	11	+19	20	Advance to play-offs	1–1	—	4–1	1–2	3–0	5–0
3	Albania	10	6	0	4	12	12	0	18		0–2	0–1	—	1–0	1–0	5–0
4	Hungary	10	5	2	3	19	13	+6	17		0–4	3–3	0–1	—	2–1	4–0
5	Andorra	10	2	0	8	8	24	−16	6		0–5	1–4	0–1	1–4	—	2–0
6	San Marino	10	0	0	10	1	46	−45	0		0–10	1–7	0–2	0–3	0–3	—

Source: FIFA, UEFA
Rules for classification: Tiebreakers

== Matches ==
The fixture list was confirmed by UEFA on 8 December 2020, the day following the draw. Times are CET/CEST, (Note: CET (UTC+1) for matches until 27 March and from 31 October (matchday 1 and 9–10), and CEST (UTC+2) for matches from 28 March to 30 October 2021 (matchday 2–8).) as listed by UEFA (local times, if different, are in parentheses).

25 March 2021
20:45

Andorra	0–1	Albania
	Report (FIFA); Report (UEFA)	Lenjani 41'

Estadi Nacional, Andorra la Vella
Attendance: 285
Referee: Volen Chinkov (Bulgaria)
25 March 2021
20:45 (19:45 UTC±0)

England	5–0	San Marino
Ward-Prowse 14'; Calvert-Lewin 21', 53'; Sterling 31'; Watkins 83'	Report (FIFA); Report (UEFA)

Wembley Stadium, London
Attendance: 0 (Note: Due to the COVID-19 pandemic in Europe, the match was played behind closed doors.)
Referee: Kirill Levnikov (Russia)
25 March 2021
20:45

Hungary	3–3	Poland
Sallai 6'; Ád. Szalai 53'; Orbán 78'	Report (FIFA); Report (UEFA)	Piątek 60'; Jóźwiak 61'; Lewandowski 83'

Puskás Aréna, Budapest
Attendance: 0
Referee: Felix Brych (Germany)

28 March 2021
18:00

Albania	0–2	England
	Report (FIFA); Report (UEFA)	Kane 38'; Mount 63'

Arena Kombëtare, Tirana
Attendance: 200
Referee: Orel Grinfeld (Israel)
28 March 2021
20:45

Poland	3–0	Andorra
Lewandowski 30', 55'; Świderski 88'	Report (FIFA); Report (UEFA)

Stadion Wojska Polskiego, Warsaw
Attendance: 0
Referee: Erik Lambrechts (Belgium)
28 March 2021
20:45

San Marino	0–3	Hungary
	Report (FIFA); Report (UEFA)	Ád. Szalai 13' (pen.); Sallai 71'; Nikolić 88' (pen.)

San Marino Stadium, Serravalle
Attendance: 0
Referee: Nicholas Walsh (Scotland)

31 March 2021
20:45

Andorra	1–4	Hungary
Pujol 90+3' (pen.)	Report (FIFA); Report (UEFA)	Fiola 45+2'; Gazdag 51'; Kleinheisler 58'; Négo 90'

Estadi Nacional, Andorra la Vella
Attendance: 338
Referee: Vilhjalmur Thorarinsson (Iceland)
31 March 2021
20:45 (19:45 UTC+1)

England	2–1	Poland
Kane 19' (pen.); Maguire 85'	Report (FIFA); Report (UEFA)	Moder 58'

Wembley Stadium, London
Attendance: 0
Referee: Björn Kuipers (Netherlands)
31 March 2021
20:45

San Marino	0–2	Albania
	Report (FIFA); Report (UEFA)	Manaj 63'; Uzuni 85'

San Marino Stadium, Serravalle
Attendance: 0
Referee: Kai Erik Steen (Norway)

2 September 2021
20:45

Andorra	2–0	San Marino
Vales 18', 24'	Report (FIFA); Report (UEFA)

Estadi Nacional, Andorra la Vella
Attendance: 1,400
Referee: Jakob Kehlet (Denmark)
2 September 2021
20:45

Hungary	0–4	England
	Report (FIFA); Report (UEFA)	Sterling 55'; Kane 63'; Maguire 69'; Rice 87'

Puskás Aréna, Budapest
Attendance: 58,260
Referee: Cüneyt Çakır (Turkey)
2 September 2021
20:45

Poland	4–1	Albania
Lewandowski 12'; Buksa 44'; Krychowiak 54'; Linetty 89'	Report (FIFA); Report (UEFA)	Cikalleshi 25'

PGE Narodowy, Warsaw
Attendance: 38,254
Referee: Maurizio Mariani (Italy)

5 September 2021
18:00

Albania	1–0	Hungary
Broja 87'	Report (FIFA); Report (UEFA)

Elbasan Arena, Elbasan
Attendance: 4,135
Referee: Danny Makkelie (Netherlands)
5 September 2021
18:00 (17:00 UTC+1)

England	4–0	Andorra
Lingard 18', 78'; Kane 72' (pen.); Saka 85'	Report (FIFA); Report (UEFA)

Wembley Stadium, London
Attendance: 67,171
Referee: Anastasios Papapetrou (Greece)
5 September 2021
20:45

San Marino	1–7	Poland
Nanni 48'	Report (FIFA); Report (UEFA)	Lewandowski 4', 21'; Świderski 16'; Linetty 44'; Buksa 67', 90+2', 90+4'

San Marino Stadium, Serravalle
Attendance: 500
Referee: Mattias Gestranius (Finland)

8 September 2021
20:45

Albania	5–0	San Marino
Manaj 32'; Laçi 58'; Broja 61'; Hysaj 68'; Uzuni 80'	Report (FIFA); Report (UEFA)

Elbasan Arena, Elbasan
Attendance: 3,850
Referee: Lukas Fähndrich (Switzerland)
8 September 2021
20:45

Hungary	2–1	Andorra
Ád. Szalai 9' (pen.); Botka 18'	Report (FIFA); Report (UEFA)	Llovera 82'

Puskás Aréna, Budapest
Attendance: 46,240
Referee: Rade Obrenovič (Slovenia)
8 September 2021
20:45

Poland	1–1	England
Szymański 90+2'	Report (FIFA); Report (UEFA)	Kane 72'

PGE Narodowy, Warsaw
Attendance: 56,212
Referee: Daniel Siebert (Germany)

9 October 2021
20:45

Andorra	0–5	England
	Report (FIFA); Report (UEFA)	Chilwell 17'; Saka 40'; Abraham 59'; Ward-Prowse 79'; Grealish 86'

Estadi Nacional, Andorra la Vella
Attendance: 2,285
Referee: Kateryna Monzul (Ukraine)
9 October 2021
20:45

Hungary	0–1	Albania
	Report (FIFA); Report (UEFA)	Broja 80'

Puskás Aréna, Budapest
Attendance: 273
Referee: Carlos del Cerro Grande (Spain)
9 October 2021
20:45

Poland	5–0	San Marino
Świderski 10'; Brolli 20' (o.g.); Kędziora 50'; Buksa 84'; Piątek 90+1'	Report (FIFA); Report (UEFA)

PGE Narodowy, Warsaw
Attendance: 56,128
Referee: Fran Jović (Croatia)

12 October 2021
20:45

Albania	0–1	Poland
	Report (FIFA); Report (UEFA)	Świderski 77'

Arena Kombëtare, Tirana
Attendance: 21,000
Referee: Clément Turpin (France)
12 October 2021
20:45 (19:45 UTC+1)

England	1–1	Hungary
Stones 37'	Report (FIFA); Report (UEFA)	Sallai 24' (pen.)

Wembley Stadium, London
Attendance: 69,380
Referee: Alejandro Hernández Hernández (Spain)
12 October 2021
20:45

San Marino	0–3	Andorra
	Report (FIFA); Report (UEFA)	Pujol 10'; Moreno 53'; Fernández 89'

San Marino Stadium, Serravalle
Attendance: 243
Referee: Halil Umut Meler (Turkey)

12 November 2021
20:45

Andorra	1–4	Poland
Vales 45'	Report (FIFA); Report (UEFA)	Lewandowski 5', 73'; Jóźwiak 11'; Milik 45+2'

Estadi Nacional, Andorra la Vella
Attendance: 1,049
Referee: John Beaton (Scotland)
12 November 2021
20:45 (19:45 UTC±0)

England	5–0	Albania
Maguire 9'; Kane 18', 33', 45+2'; Henderson 28'	Report (FIFA); Report (UEFA)

Wembley Stadium, London
Attendance: 80,366
Referee: Ruddy Buquet (France)
12 November 2021
20:45

Hungary	4–0	San Marino
Szoboszlai 6', 83'; Gazdag 22'; Vécsei 88'	Report (FIFA); Report (UEFA)

Puskás Aréna, Budapest
Attendance: 12,800
Referee: Filip Glova (Slovakia)

15 November 2021
20:45

Albania	1–0	Andorra
Çekiçi 73' (pen.)	Report (FIFA); Report (UEFA)

Arena Kombëtare, Tirana
Attendance: 75
Referee: Andris Treimanis (Latvia)
15 November 2021
20:45

Poland	1–2	Hungary
Świderski 61'	Report (FIFA); Report (UEFA)	Schäfer 37'; Gazdag 80'

PGE Narodowy, Warsaw
Attendance: 56,197
Referee: Tiago Martins (Portugal)
15 November 2021
20:45

San Marino	0–10	England
	Report (FIFA); Report (UEFA)	Maguire 6'; Fabbri 15' (o.g.); Kane 27' (pen.), 32', 39' (pen.), 42'; Smith Rowe 58'; Mings 69'; Abraham 78'; Saka 79'

San Marino Stadium, Serravalle
Attendance: 2,775
Referee: Rade Obrenovič (Slovenia)

== Goalscorers ==
There were 109 goals scored in 30 matches, for an average of 3.63 goals per match.

12 goals

- (England) Harry Kane

8 goals

- (Poland) Robert Lewandowski

5 goals

- (Poland) Adam Buksa
- (Poland) Karol Świderski

4 goals

- (England) Harry Maguire

3 goals

- (Albania) Armando Broja
- (Andorra) Marc Vales
- (England) Bukayo Saka
- (Hungary) Dániel Gazdag
- (Hungary) Roland Sallai
- (Hungary) Ádám Szalai

2 goals

- (Albania) Rey Manaj
- (Albania) Myrto Uzuni
- (Andorra) Marc Pujol
- (England) Tammy Abraham
- (England) Dominic Calvert-Lewin
- (England) Jesse Lingard
- (England) Raheem Sterling
- (England) James Ward-Prowse
- (Hungary) Dominik Szoboszlai
- (Poland) Kamil Jóźwiak
- (Poland) Karol Linetty
- (Poland) Krzysztof Piątek

1 goal

- (Albania) Endri Çekiçi
- (Albania) Sokol Cikalleshi
- (Albania) Elseid Hysaj
- (Albania) Qazim Laçi
- (Albania) Ermir Lenjani
- (Andorra) Ricard Fernández
- (Andorra) Max Llovera
- (Andorra) Sergi Moreno
- (England) Ben Chilwell
- (England) Jack Grealish
- (England) Jordan Henderson
- (England) Tyrone Mings
- (England) Mason Mount
- (England) Declan Rice
- (England) Emile Smith Rowe
- (England) John Stones
- (England) Ollie Watkins
- (Hungary) Endre Botka
- (Hungary) Attila Fiola
- (Hungary) László Kleinheisler
- (Hungary) Loïc Négo
- (Hungary) Nemanja Nikolić
- (Hungary) Willi Orbán
- (Hungary) András Schäfer
- (Hungary) Bálint Vécsei
- (Poland) Tomasz Kędziora
- (Poland) Grzegorz Krychowiak
- (Poland) Arkadiusz Milik
- (Poland) Jakub Moder
- (Poland) Damian Szymański
- (San Marino) Nicola Nanni

1 own goal

- (San Marino) Cristian Brolli (against Poland)
- (San Marino) Filippo Fabbri (against England)

== Discipline ==
A player was automatically suspended for the next match for the following offences:

- Receiving a red card (red card suspensions could be extended for serious offences)
- Receiving two yellow cards in two different matches (yellow card suspensions were carried forward to the play-offs, but not the finals or any other future international matches)

The following suspensions were served during the qualifying matches:

Team	Player	Offence(s)	Suspended for match(es)
Albania	Keidi Bare	(yellow card) vs England (28 March 2021); (yellow card) vs Poland (2 September 2021)	vs Hungary (5 September 2021)
Albania	Endri Çekiçi	(yellow card) vs Hungary (5 September 2021); (yellow card) vs Hungary (9 October 2021)	vs Poland (12 October 2021)
Albania	Sokol Cikalleshi	(yellow card) vs Andorra (25 March 2021); (yellow card) vs England (12 November 2021)	vs Andorra (15 November 2021)
Albania	Klaus Gjasula	(yellow card) vs Andorra (25 March 2021); (yellow card) vs England (28 March 2021)	vs San Marino (31 March 2021)
Albania	Klaus Gjasula	(yellow card) vs Poland (2 September 2021); (yellow card) vs Hungary (5 September 2021)	vs San Marino (8 September 2021)
Albania	Klaus Gjasula	(yellow card) vs Hungary (9 October 2021); (yellow card) vs England (12 November 2021)	vs Andorra (15 November 2021)
Albania	Elseid Hysaj	(yellow card) vs England (28 March 2021); (yellow card) vs Poland (2 September 2021)	vs Hungary (5 September 2021)
Albania	Ardian Ismajli	(yellow card) vs Poland (12 October 2021); (yellow card) vs England (12 November 2021)	vs Andorra (15 November 2021)
Albania	Rey Manaj	(yellow card) vs Andorra (25 March 2021); (yellow card) vs Poland (2 September 2021)	vs Hungary (5 September 2021)
Andorra	Jordi Aláez	(yellow card) vs Poland (28 March 2021); (yellow card) vs San Marino (2 September 2021)	vs England (5 September 2021)
Andorra	Albert Alavedra	(yellow card) vs Hungary (31 March 2021); (yellow card) vs Hungary (8 September 2021)	vs England (9 October 2021)
Andorra	Ricard Fernández	(red card) vs Poland (12 November 2021)	vs Albania (15 November 2021)
Andorra	Christian García	(yellow card) (yellow-red card) vs Latvia in 2020–21 UEFA Nations League (17 November 2020)	vs Albania (25 March 2021)
Andorra	Christian García	(yellow card) vs Poland (28 March 2021); (yellow card) vs England (5 September 2021)	vs Hungary (8 September 2021)
Andorra	Marc Pujol	(yellow card) vs Hungary (31 March 2021); (yellow card) vs San Marino (2 September 2021)	vs England (5 September 2021)
Andorra	Marc Rebés	(yellow card) vs Albania (25 March 2021); (yellow card) vs England (5 September 2021)	vs Hungary (8 September 2021)
Andorra	Chus Rubio	(yellow card) vs Albania (25 March 2021); (yellow card) vs England (5 September 2021)	vs Hungary (8 September 2021)
Andorra	Moisés San Nicolás	(yellow card) vs Hungary (31 March 2021); (yellow card) vs Hungary (8 September 2021)	vs England (9 October 2021)
Andorra	Marc Vales	(yellow card) vs Hungary (31 March 2021); (yellow card) vs England (5 September 2021)	vs Hungary (8 September 2021)
Andorra	Márcio Vieira	(yellow card) vs Albania (25 March 2021); (yellow card) vs Hungary (8 September 2021)	vs England (9 October 2021)
England	Tyrone Mings	(yellow card) vs San Marino (25 March 2021); (yellow card) vs Andorra (5 September 2021)	vs Poland (8 September 2021)
Hungary	Endre Botka	(yellow card) vs San Marino (28 March 2021); (yellow card) vs Albania (9 October 2021)	vs England (12 October 2021)
Hungary	Attila Fiola	(yellow card) (yellow-red card) vs Poland (25 March 2021)	vs San Marino (28 March 2021)
Hungary	Ádám Nagy	(yellow card) vs Poland (25 March 2021); (yellow card) vs Andorra (31 March 2021)	vs England (2 September 2021)
Hungary	Willi Orbán	(yellow card) vs England (2 September 2021); (yellow card) vs Albania (5 September 2021)	vs Andorra (8 September 2021)
Poland	Jan Bednarek	(yellow card) vs Albania (2 September 2021); (yellow card) vs Albania (12 October 2021)	vs Andorra (12 November 2021)
Poland	Grzegorz Krychowiak	(yellow card) vs England (8 September 2021); (yellow card) vs Andorra (12 November 2021)	vs Hungary (15 November 2021)
Poland	Karol Linetty	(yellow card) vs England (8 September 2021); (yellow card) vs San Marino (9 October 2021)	vs Albania (12 October 2021)
Poland	Tymoteusz Puchacz	(yellow card) vs England (8 September 2021); (yellow card) vs Albania (12 October 2021)	vs Andorra (12 November 2021)
San Marino	Manuel Battistini	(yellow card) vs Hungary (28 March 2021); (yellow card) vs Andorra (2 September 2021)	vs Poland (5 September 2021)
San Marino	Lorenzo Lunadei	(yellow card) vs Hungary (28 March 2021); (yellow card) vs Poland (5 September 2021)	vs Albania (8 September 2021)
San Marino	Marcello Mularoni	(yellow card) vs Albania (31 March 2021); (yellow card) vs Poland (5 September 2021)	vs Albania (8 September 2021)
San Marino	Davide Simoncini	(red card) vs Gibraltar in 2020–21 UEFA Nations League (14 November 2020)	vs England (25 March 2021) vs Hungary (28 March 2021)
San Marino	Davide Simoncini	(yellow card) vs Albania (31 March 2021); (yellow card) vs Andorra (12 October 2021)	vs Hungary (12 November 2021)
