= Filippo Fabbri =

Sammarinese football player (born 2002)

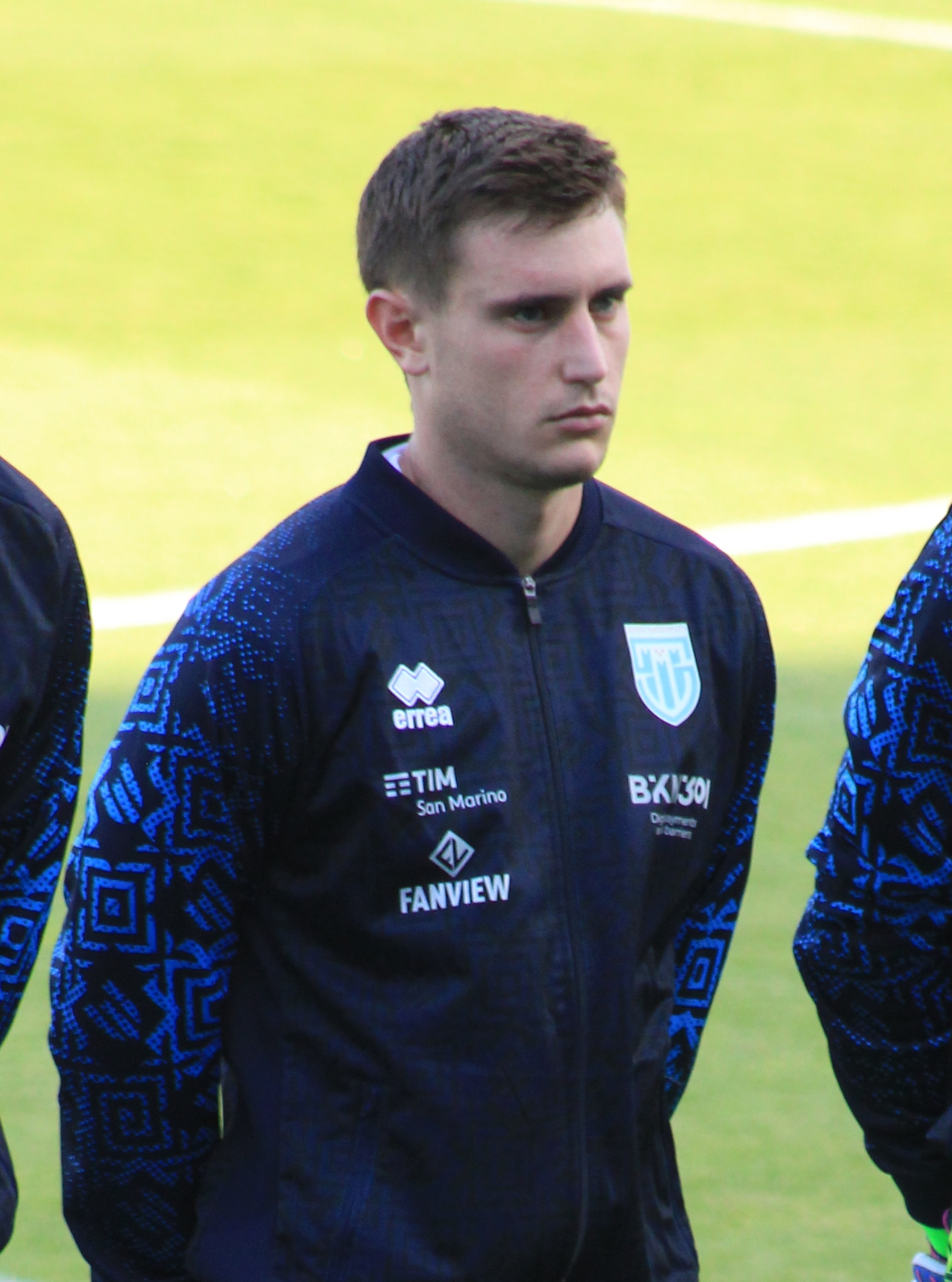
- Fabbri with San Marino in 2024

Personal information
- Date of birth: 7 January 2002 (age 24)
- Place of birth: City of San Marino, San Marino
- Height: 1.85 m (6 ft 1 in)
- Positions: Centre-back; right-back

Team information
- Current team: Mezzolara

Youth career
- –2018: Cesena
- 2018–2019: SPAL
- 2019–2021: Cesena

Senior career*
Years	Team	Apps	(Gls)
2021	Cesena	0	(0)
2021	→ Correggese (loan)	12	(0)
2021–2022	Forlì	29	(0)
2022–2024	Olbia	39	(2)
2024–2026	San Marino	16	(1)
2026	Tropical Coriano	14	(0)
2026–	Mezzolara	3	(0)

International career^{‡}
2017–2018	San Marino U17	6	(0)
2019	San Marino U19	3	(1)
2020–2024	San Marino U21	4	(0)
2021–	San Marino	45	(1)
- * Club domestic league appearances and goals as of 20 September 2026 ‡ National team caps and goals as of 12 November 2026

Filippo Fabbri (born 7 January 2002) is a Sammarinese professional footballer who plays as a centre-back or right-back for Italian Serie D club Mezzolara and the San Marino national team.

== Club career ==
On 6 July 2022, Serie C club Olbia announced the signing of Fabbri on a two-year deal. On 26 November 2024, he joined Victor San Marino on a contract until the end of the season.

== International career ==
Fabbri has represented San Marino at several age levels.

He received his first call up for the San Marino senior side in March 2021. He made his debut on 28 March 2021 in a World Cup qualifier against Hungary.

== Career statistics ==
=== Club ===
As of match played 15 May 2022

Appearances and goals by club, season and competition
Club	Season	League			Cup		Continental		Total	
Club	Season	Division	Apps	Goals	Apps	Goals	Apps	Goals	Apps	Goals
Cesena	2020–21	Serie C	0	0	0	0	–		0	0
Correggese (loan)	2020–21	Serie D	12	0	0	0	–		12	0
Forlì	2021–22	Serie D	29	0	0	0	–		29	0
Career total			33	0	0	0	0	0	33	0

=== International ===
As of match played 12 November 2026

Appearances and goals by national team and year
National team	Year	Apps	Goals
San Marino	2021	11	0
San Marino	2022	5	1
San Marino	2023	7	0
San Marino	2024	7	0
San Marino	2025	6	0
San Marino	2026	9	0
Total		45	1

Scores and results list San Marino's goal tally first, score column indicates score after each Fabbri goal.

List of international goals scored by Filippo Fabbri
No.	Date	Venue	Opponent	Score	Result	Competition
1	25 March 2022	San Marino Stadium, Serravalle, San Marino	Lithuania	1–2	1–2	Friendly
