= UEFA Euro 2024 qualifying Group G =

Group G of UEFA Euro 2024 qualifying was one of the ten groups to decide which teams would qualify for the UEFA Euro 2024 final tournament in Germany. Group G consisted of five teams: Bulgaria, Hungary, Lithuania, Montenegro and Serbia. The teams played against each other home-and-away in a round-robin format.

The top two teams, Hungary and Serbia, qualified directly for the final tournament. The participants of the qualifying play-offs were decided based on their performance in the 2022–23 UEFA Nations League.

== Standings ==
Pos	Team	Pld	W	D	L	GF	GA	GD	Pts	Qualification	(Hungary)	(Serbia)	(Montenegro)	(Lithuania)	(Bulgaria)
1	Hungary	8	5	3	0	16	7	+9	18	Qualify for final tournament	—	2–1	3–1	2–0	3–0
2	Serbia	8	4	2	2	15	9	+6	14	Qualify for final tournament	1–2	—	3–1	2–0	2–2
3	Montenegro	8	3	2	3	9	11	−2	11		0–0	0–2	—	2–0	2–1
4	Lithuania	8	1	3	4	8	14	−6	6		2–2	1–3	2–2	—	1–1
5	Bulgaria	8	0	4	4	7	14	−7	4		2–2	1–1	0–1	0–2	—

Source: UEFA
Rules for classification: Qualification tiebreakers

== Matches ==
The fixture list was confirmed by UEFA on 10 October 2022, the day after the draw. Times are CET/CEST, (Note: CET (UTC+1) for matches until 25 March and from 29 October (matchday 1 and 9–10), and CEST (UTC+2) for matches from 26 March to 28 October 2023 (matchday 2–8).) as listed by UEFA (local times, if different, are in parentheses).

24 March 2023
18:00 (19:00 UTC+2)

Bulgaria	0–1	Montenegro
	Report	Krstović 70'

Ludogorets Arena, Razgrad
Attendance: 9,180
Referee: Aliyar Aghayev (Azerbaijan)
24 March 2023
20:45

Serbia	2–0	Lithuania
Tadić 16'; Vlahović 53'	Report

Stadion Rajko Mitić, Belgrade
Attendance: 21,125
Referee: Lawrence Visser (Belgium)

27 March 2023
20:45

Hungary	3–0	Bulgaria
Vécsei 7'; Szoboszlai 26'; Ádám 39'	Report

Puskás Aréna, Budapest
Attendance: 53,000
Referee: Halil Umut Meler (Turkey)
27 March 2023
20:45

Montenegro	0–2	Serbia
	Report	Vlahović 78', 90+6'

City Stadium, Podgorica
Attendance: 9,831
Referee: Clément Turpin (France)

17 June 2023
15:00 (16:00 UTC+3)

Lithuania	1–1	Bulgaria
Girdvainis 15'	Report	M. Petkov 27'

Darius and Girėnas Stadium, Kaunas
Attendance: 14,230
Referee: Jakob Alexander Sundberg (Denmark)
17 June 2023
18:00

Montenegro	0–0	Hungary
	Report

City Stadium, Podgorica
Attendance: 6,761
Referee: Jesús Gil Manzano (Spain)

20 June 2023
20:45 (21:45 UTC+3)

Bulgaria	1–1	Serbia
Despodov 47'	Report	Lazović 90+6'

Ludogorets Arena, Razgrad
Attendance: 6,700
Referee: Craig Pawson (England)
20 June 2023
20:45

Hungary	2–0	Lithuania
Varga 32'; Sallai 83'	Report

Puskás Aréna, Budapest
Attendance: 58,274
Referee: António Nobre (Portugal)

7 September 2023
18:00 (19:00 UTC+3)

Lithuania	2–2	Montenegro
Paulauskas 71'; Černych 90+4'	Report	Krstović 78'; Savić 89'

Darius and Girėnas Stadium, Kaunas
Attendance: 11,328
Referee: Mohammed Al-Hakim (Sweden)
7 September 2023
20:45

Serbia	1–2	Hungary
A. Szalai 10' (o.g.)	Report	Varga 34'; Orbán 36'

Stadion Rajko Mitić, Belgrade
Attendance: 6,924
Referee: Juan Martínez Munuera (Spain)

10 September 2023
18:00

Montenegro	2–1	Bulgaria
Savić 45+1'; Jovetić 90+6'	Report	Borukov 79'

City Stadium, Podgorica
Attendance: 4,232
Referee: Harm Osmers (Germany)
10 September 2023
20:45 (21:45 UTC+3)

Lithuania	1–3	Serbia
Paulauskas 45'	Report	A. Mitrović 21', 32', 43'

Darius and Girėnas Stadium, Kaunas
Attendance: 8,586
Referee: Sascha Stegemann (Germany)

14 October 2023
18:00 (19:00 UTC+3)

Bulgaria	0–2	Lithuania
	Report	Širvys 45', 55'

Vasil Levski National Stadium, Sofia
Attendance: 6,916
Referee: Giorgi Kruashvili (Georgia)
14 October 2023
20:45

Hungary	2–1	Serbia
Varga 20'; Sallai 34'	Report	Pavlović 33'

Puskás Aréna, Budapest
Attendance: 58,215
Referee: François Letexier (France)

17 October 2023
20:45 (21:45 UTC+3)

Lithuania	2–2	Hungary
Černych 20'; Širvys 36'	Report	Szoboszlai 67' (pen.); Varga 82'

Darius and Girėnas Stadium, Kaunas
Attendance: 5,349
Referee: Juxhin Xhaja (Albania)
17 October 2023
20:45

Serbia	3–1	Montenegro
Mitrović 9', 74'; Tadić 77'	Report	Jovetić 36'

Stadion Rajko Mitić, Belgrade
Attendance: 25,884
Referee: Szymon Marciniak (Poland)

16 November 2023
18:00 (19:00 UTC+2)

Bulgaria	2–2	Hungary
Delev 24'; Despodov 79' (pen.)	Report	Ádám 10'; A. Petkov 90+7' (o.g.)

Vasil Levski National Stadium, Sofia
Attendance: 230
Referee: Daniel Stefański (Poland)
16 November 2023
20:45

Montenegro	2–0	Lithuania
Kuč 3'; Jovetić 48'	Report

City Stadium, Podgorica
Attendance: 3,647
Referee: Artur Soares Dias (Portugal)

19 November 2023
15:00

Hungary	3–1	Montenegro
Szoboszlai 66', 68'; Á. Nagy 90+3'	Report	Rubežić 36'

Puskás Aréna, Budapest
Attendance: 59,600
Referee: Danny Makkelie (Netherlands)
19 November 2023
15:00

Serbia	2–2	Bulgaria
Veljković 16'; Babić 82'	Report	Rusev 59'; Despodov 69'

Dubočica Stadium, Leskovac
Attendance: 7,325
Referee: Erik Lambrechts (Belgium)

== Goalscorers ==
There were 55 goals scored in 20 matches, for an average of 2.75 goals per match.

5 goals

- (Serbia) Aleksandar Mitrović

4 goals

- (Hungary) Dominik Szoboszlai
- (Hungary) Barnabás Varga

3 goals

- (Bulgaria) Kiril Despodov
- (Lithuania) Pijus Širvys
- (Montenegro) Stevan Jovetić
- (Serbia) Dušan Vlahović

2 goals

- (Hungary) Martin Ádám
- (Hungary) Roland Sallai
- (Lithuania) Fedor Černych
- (Lithuania) Gytis Paulauskas
- (Montenegro) Nikola Krstović
- (Montenegro) Stefan Savić
- (Serbia) Dušan Tadić

1 goal

- (Bulgaria) Preslav Borukov
- (Bulgaria) Spas Delev
- (Bulgaria) Marin Petkov
- (Bulgaria) Georgi Rusev
- (Hungary) Ádám Nagy
- (Hungary) Willi Orbán
- (Hungary) Bálint Vécsei
- (Lithuania) Edvinas Girdvainis
- (Montenegro) Edvin Kuč
- (Montenegro) Slobodan Rubežić
- (Serbia) Srđan Babić
- (Serbia) Darko Lazović
- (Serbia) Strahinja Pavlović
- (Serbia) Miloš Veljković

1 own goal

- (Bulgaria) Aleks Petkov (against Hungary)
- (Hungary) Attila Szalai (against Serbia)

== Discipline ==
A player was automatically suspended for the next match for the following offences:

- Receiving a red card (red card suspensions could be extended for serious offences)
- Receiving three yellow cards in three different matches, as well as after fifth and any subsequent yellow card (yellow card suspensions could be carried forward to the play-offs, but not the finals or any other future international matches)

The following suspensions were served during the qualifying matches:

Team	Player	Offence(s)	Suspended for match(es)
Bulgaria	Andrian Kraev	(yellow card) (yellow-red card) vs Lithuania (14 October 2023)	vs Hungary (16 November 2023)
Bulgaria	Valentin Antov	(yellow card) (yellow-red card) vs Hungary (16 November 2023)	vs Serbia (19 November 2023)
Lithuania	Justas Lasickas	(red card) vs Bulgaria (17 June 2023)	vs Hungary (20 June 2023)
Montenegro	Žarko Tomašević	(yellow card) (yellow-red card) vs Finland in 2022–23 UEFA Nations League (26 September 2022)	vs Bulgaria (24 March 2023)
Montenegro	Igor Vujačić	(yellow card) (yellow-red card) vs Bulgaria (10 September 2023)	vs Serbia (17 October 2023)
Montenegro	Stefan Savić	(yellow card) vs Bulgaria (24 March 2023); (yellow card) vs Hungary (17 June 2023); (yellow card) vs Serbia (17 October 2023)	vs Lithuania (16 November 2023)
Hungary	Zsolt Kalmár	(yellow card) (yellow-red card) vs Serbia (14 October 2023)	vs Lithuania (17 October 2023)
Hungary	Milos Kerkez	(yellow card) (yellow-red card) vs Bulgaria (16 November 2023)	vs Montenegro (19 November 2023)
