= Puskás Aréna =

Football stadium in Budapest, Hungary

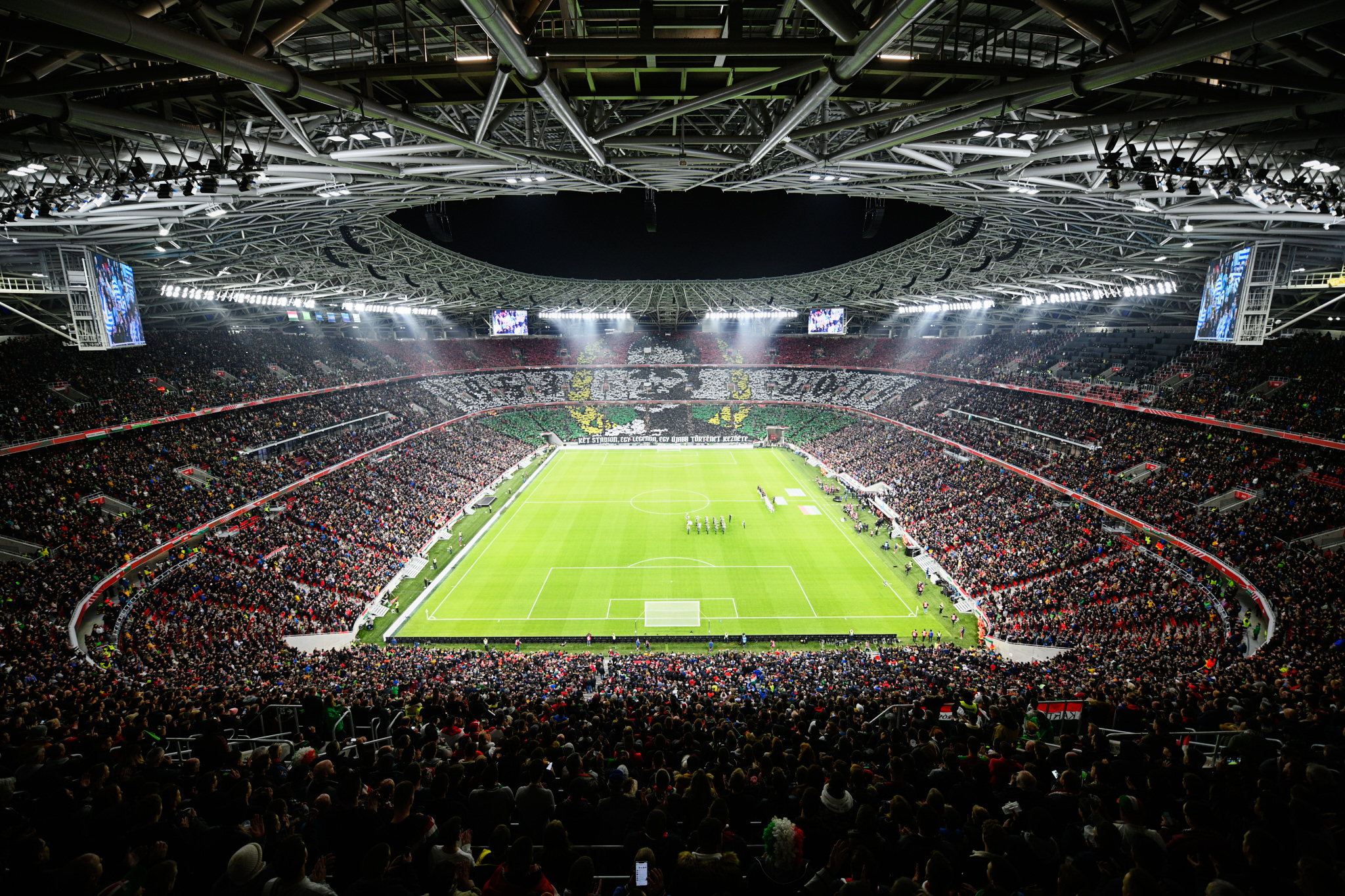
- UEFA
- Interactive map of Puskás Aréna
- Full name: Puskás Arena
- Location: Dózsa György út 1, Zugló, Budapest, Hungary
- Coordinates: 47.5030°N 19.0979°E
- Owner: Hungarian Football Federation (MLSZ)
- Capacity: 67,215
- Surface: Grass
- Record attendance: 75,000 (Metallica; 11 June 2026)
- Public transit: Puskás Ferenc Stadion

Construction
- Built: 2017–2019
- Opened: 15 November 2019; 7 years ago
- Cost: €533 million (€593 million in 2021 euros)
- Architect: György Skardelli

Tenant
- Hungary national football team (2019–present)

Puskás Aréna (Hungarian pronunciation: [ˈpuʃkaːʃ ˈɒreːnɒ]) is a football stadium in the 14th district (Zugló) of Budapest, Hungary, which primarily serves as the home stadium of the Hungary national football team. The stadium's construction started in 2017 and was finished before the end of 2019. It is an all-seater stadium with a capacity of 67,215. The stadium is built in the place of the former Ferenc Puskás Stadium whose demolition was completed in October 2016. Both stadiums were named in honour of the former national team captain and Hungarian legend Ferenc Puskás (1927–2006).

== History ==
In 2011, when originally budgeted, the cost of the construction of the new stadium was put at 35 billion Hungarian forints.

On 26 June 2014, László Vigh said that the construction of the new stadium would cost 90-100 billion Hungarian forints.

On 1 August 2014, the Nemzeti Sport Központ (the National Sports Center) presented the final vision of Hungary's new national stadium. The Hungarian architect György Skardelli, who was the designer of the nearby indoor arena, László Papp Budapest Sports Arena showed his original plans that did not include the demolition of the original stadium

On 19 September 2014, UEFA selected Budapest to host three group stage games and one round of 16 game at UEFA Euro 2020.

On 19 September 2014, Sándor Csányi, the president of the Hungarian Football Federation, said that the fact that Budapest can host UEFA Euro 2020 is a big achievement of the Hungarian sport diplomacy.

On 23 February 2017, János Lázár, Minister of Prime Minister's Office of Hungary, said that the cost of the stadium will rise to 190 billion Hungarian forint from the previously estimated 100 billion. The current budget of 190 billion Hungarian forints (EUR 610 million) is well over 100% of the original cost estimates and is far more expensive than similarly sized stadiums in Europe such as Allianz Arena in Munich or Arsenal's Emirates Stadium.

In 2014, the original designs of the new Puskás Ferenc stadium was voted the best design by Stadiumdb.com which complimented the imaginative design which included an elevated running track that overlooked the pitch and had city skyline views. However, by the time of construction two attempts at cutting unnecessary elements from the project scaled back the design to being football-focused because of the huge inflation of the construction budget and the desire to build a new athletics stadium in Budapest by Hungarian Prime Minister Viktor Orbán for a future Summer Olympics bid.

On 29 June 2018, the Visitors' Centre of the Puskás Ferenc Stadium was opened. Balázs Fürjes, minister responsible for Budapest and its agglomeration, said at the opening of the centre that the new stadium would be more than a stadium. It would be a multi-purpose stadium that can hold concerts and conferences as well. He also said that preferably the stadium would host the 2021 UEFA Champions League Final.

On 14 December 2018, the Hungarian Association of Sports Journalists (in Hungarian: Magyar Sportújságírók Szövetsége) and the members of the communication department of the Hungarian Football Federation visited the construction. Current members of Toldy Construct team also contributed to this project. They helped to realize specialised construction and design elements of the facade and roof.

All of the seats were mounted by 2 October 2019.

Cashless catering system was installed in the new arena. In the arena only touch cards or NFC are accepted.

Only 500 parking spaces were created around the new stadium. Therefore, it is advisable to arrive at the arena by using public transport.

=== Opening ===
On 15 November 2019 the arena was opened by the match Hungary-Uruguay. The idea to invite the Uruguay national football team came from Károly Jankovics who is the leader of the Hungarian community in Montevideo.

All of the tickets were sold for the opening match against Uruguay. In the first three days only the members of the Supporters' Club of the Hungarian Football Federation could purchase the tickets.

Although the opening match was planned to be the last match of Zoltán Gera, he did not play at the opening match, as he said that his condition would not make it possible to play against Uruguay. Uruguay won the game, 2–1.

=== Present (2019–) ===
In 2020, due to COVID-19 pandemic in Europe, the 2020 UEFA Super Cup matches was moved from Estádio do Dragão, Porto, Portugal to Budapest, Hungary.

On 31 May 2023, Roma and Sevilla played in the 2023 UEFA Europa League final with Sevilla winning a 4–1 penalty shootout after a 1–1 draw.

On 4 February 2025, the ventillator system caught fire on the sixth floor. A total of 25 fire engine trucks arrived at the scene and extinguished the fire.

On 30 May 2026, Paris Saint-Germain and Arsenal played in the 2026 UEFA Champions League final with PSG winning a 4–3 penalty shootout after a 1–1 draw.

The stadium will host the 2029 UEFA Conference League final on 30 May 2029, marking the first and as of 2029 only stadium which hosted all men's UEFA finals, including Champions League final, Europa League final, Conference League final and Super Cup.

== Notable matches ==
=== Hungarian Cup finals ===
3 June 2020 2019–20 Magyar Kupa Final	Budapest Honvéd (Hungary)	2–1	(Hungary) Mezőkövesdi SE
20:00 CEST	Lovrić 33'; Kamber 56'	Report	Pekár 37'	Attendance: 10,000; Referee: Tamás Bognár

3 May 2021 2020–21 Magyar Kupa Final	Fehérvár (Hungary)	0–1 (a.e.t.)	(Hungary) Újpest
20:00 CEST		Report	Kastrati 101'	Attendance: 4,500; Referee: Gergő Bogár

11 May 2022 2021–22 Magyar Kupa Final	Ferencváros (Hungary)	3–0	(Hungary) Paks
19:30 CEST	Zachariassen 16'; Boli 83', 86'	Report		Attendance: 38,979; Referee: Tamás Bognár

3 May 2023 2022–23 Magyar Kupa Final	Budafok (Hungary)	0–2 (a.e.t.)	(Hungary) Zalaegerszeg
19:30 CEST		Report	D. Németh 117'; Szalay 120+2'	Attendance: 24,152; Referee: István Vad

15 May 2024 2023–24 Magyar Kupa Final	Paks (Hungary)	2–0 (a.e.t.)	(Hungary) Ferencváros
19:30 CEST		Report	K. Papp 98'; Zs. Haraszti 120+2'	Attendance: 51,900; Referee: Balázs Berke

14 May 2025 2024–25 Magyar Kupa Final	Ferencváros (Hungary)	1–1 (a.e.t.) (3–4 p)	(Hungary) Paks
19:00 CEST	L. Joseph 93'	Report	B. Tóth 46'	Attendance: 54,762; Referee: Csaba Pintér
	Penalties
	Pešić (penalty missed); Zachariassen (penalty scored); Joseph (penalty missed); Raul Gustavo (penalty scored); Cissé (penalty scored)		(penalty scored) Windecker; (penalty scored) Ádám; (penalty missed) Balogh; (penalty scored) Gyurkits; (penalty scored) Vécsei

9 May 2026 2025–26 Magyar Kupa Final	Ferencváros (Hungary)	1–0 (a.e.t.)	(Hungary) Zalaegerszeg
18:00 CEST	Raemaekers 111'	Report		Attendance: 49,858; Referee: Márton Rúsz

=== UEFA club matches ===
==== 2020 UEFA Super Cup ====
24 September 2020	Bayern Munich (Germany)	2–1 (a.e.t.)	(Spain) Sevilla
21:00 UTC+2	Goretzka 34'; Martínez 104'	Report	Ocampos 13' (pen.)	Attendance: 15,180; Referee: Anthony Taylor (England)

==== 2020–21 UEFA Champions League matches ====
4 November 2020 Group G	Ferencváros (Hungary)	1–4	(Italy) Juventus
21:00 CET (UTC+1)	Boli 90'	Report	Morata 7', 60'; Dybala 73'; Dvali 81' (o.g.)	Attendance: 18,531; Referee: Orel Grinfeld (Israel)

2 December 2020 Group G	Ferencváros (Hungary)	0–3	(Spain) Barcelona
21:00 CET (UTC+1)		Report	Griezmann 14'; Braithwaite 20'; Dembélé 28' (pen.)	Attendance: 0 Referee: Aleksei Kulbakov (Belarus)

16 February 2021 Round of 16 first leg	RB Leipzig (Germany)	0–2	(England) Liverpool
21:00 CET (UTC+1)		Report	Salah 53'; Mané 58'	Attendance: 0 Referee: Slavko Vinčić (Slovenia)

24 February 2021 Round of 16 first leg	Borussia Mönchengladbach (Germany)	0–2	(England) Manchester City
21:00 CET (UTC+1)		Report	Silva 29'; Gabriel Jesus 65'	Attendance: 0 Referee: Artur Soares Dias (Portugal)

10 March 2021 Round of 16 second leg	Liverpool (England)	2–0	(Germany) RB Leipzig
21:00 CET (UTC+1)	Salah 70'; Mané 74'	Report		Attendance: 0 Referee: Clément Turpin (France)

16 March 2021 Round of 16 second leg	Manchester City (England)	2–0	(Germany) Borussia Mönchengladbach
21:00 CET (UTC+1)	De Bruyne 12'; Gündoğan 18'	Report		Attendance: 0 Referee: Sergei Karasev (Russia)

==== 2020–21 UEFA Europa League matches ====
18 February 2021 Round of 32 first leg	Wolfsberger AC (Austria)	1–4	(England) Tottenham Hotspur
18:55 CET (UTC+1)	Liendl 55' (pen.)	Report	Son Heung-min 13'; Bale 28'; Lucas 34'; Carlos Vinícius 88'	Attendance: 0 Referee: Ali Palabıyık (Turkey)

18 March 2021 Round of 16 second leg	Molde (Norway)	2–1	(Spain) Granada
18:55 CET (UTC+1)	Vallejo 29' (o.g.); Hestad 90' (pen.)	Report	Soldado 72'	Attendance: 0 Referee: Srđan Jovanović (Serbia)

==== 2022–23 UEFA Europa League matches ====
16 March 2023 Round of 16 second leg	Ferencváros (Hungary)	0–2	(Germany) Bayer Leverkusen
21:00 CET (UTC+1)		Report	Diaby 3'; Adli 81'	Attendance: 50,675; Referee: Artur Soares Dias (Portugal)

==== 2023 UEFA Europa League final ====
31 May 2023	Sevilla (Spain)	1–1 (a.e.t.) (4–1 p)	(Italy) Roma
21:00 UTC+2	Mancini 55' (o.g.)	Report	Dybala 35'	Attendance: 61,476; Referee: Anthony Taylor (England)
	Penalties
	Ocampos (penalty scored); Lamela (penalty scored); Rakitić (penalty scored); Montiel (penalty scored)		(penalty scored) Cristante; (penalty missed) Mancini; (penalty missed) Ibañez

==== 2026 UEFA Champions League final ====
30 May 2026	Paris Saint-Germain (France)	1–1 (a.e.t.) (4–3 p)	(England) Arsenal
18:00 UTC+2	Dembélé 65' (pen.)	Report	Havertz 6'	Attendance: 61,035; Referee: Daniel Siebert (Germany)
	Penalties
	Ramos (penalty scored); Doué (penalty scored); Mendes (penalty missed); Hakimi (penalty scored); Beraldo (penalty scored)		(penalty scored) Gyökeres; (penalty missed) Eze; (penalty scored) Rice; (penalty scored) Martinelli; (penalty missed) Gabriel

==== 2029 UEFA Conference League final ====
30 May 2029	v
21:00 UTC+2

=== UEFA Euro 2020 matches ===
15 June 2021 Group F	Hungary	0–3	Portugal
18:00 CEST (UTC+2)		Report	Guerreiro 84'; Ronaldo 87' (pen.), 90+2'	Attendance: 55,662; Referee: Cüneyt Çakır (Turkey)

19 June 2021 Group F	Hungary	1–1	France
15:00 CEST (UTC+2)	Fiola 45+2'	Report	Griezmann 66'	Attendance: 55,998; Referee: Michael Oliver (England)

23 June 2021 Group F	Portugal	2–2	France
21:00 CEST (UTC+2)	Ronaldo 31' (pen.), 60' (pen.)	Report	Benzema 45+2' (pen.), 47'	Attendance: 54,886; Referee: Antonio Mateu Lahoz (Spain)

27 June 2021 Round of 16	Netherlands	0–2	Czech Republic
18:00 CEST (UTC+2)		Report	Holeš 68'; Schick 80'	Attendance: 52,834; Referee: Sergei Karasev (Russia)

=== Hungary national football team matches ===
15 November 2019 Friendly match (opening game at stadium)	Hungary	1–2	Uruguay
19:00 CET	Á. Szalai 24'	Report	Cavani 15'; Rodríguez 21'	Attendance: 65,114; Referee: Damir Skomina (Slovenia)

6 September 2020 2020–21 UEFA NL	Hungary	2–3	Russia
18:00 CEST	Sallai 62'; Nikolić 70'	Report	Miranchuk 15'; Ozdoyev 34'; Fernandes 46'	Attendance: 0 Referee: Maurizio Mariani (Italy)

12 November 2020 Euro 2020 Q PO	Hungary	2–1	Iceland
20:45 CET	Négo 88'; Szoboszlai 90+2'	Report	G. Sigurðsson 11'	Attendance: 0 Referee: Björn Kuipers (Netherlands)

15 November 2020 2020–21 UEFA NL	Hungary	1–1	Serbia
20:45 CET	Kalmár 39'	Report	Radonjić 17'	Attendance: 0 Referee: Glenn Nyberg (Sweden)

18 November 2020 2020–21 UEFA NL	Hungary	2–0	Turkey
20:45 CET	Sigér 57'; Varga 90+5'	Report		Attendance: 0 Referee: Ivan Kružliak (Slovakia)

25 March 2021 2022 FIFA WC Q	Hungary	3–3	Poland
20:45 CET	Sallai 6'; Á. Szalai 53'; Orbán 78'	Report	Piątek 60'; Jóźwiak 61'; Lewandowski 83'	Attendance: 0 Referee: Felix Brych (Germany)

15 June 2021 Euro 2020	Hungary	0–3	Portugal
18:00 CEST		Report	Guerreiro 84'; Ronaldo 87' (pen.), 90+2'	Attendance: 55,662; Referee: Cüneyt Çakır (Turkey)

19 June 2021 Euro 2020	Hungary	1–1	France
15:00 CEST	Fiola 45+2'	Report	Griezmann 66'	Attendance: 55,998; Referee: Michael Oliver (England)

2 September 2021 2022 FIFA WC Q	Hungary	0–4	England
20:45 CEST		Report	Sterling 55'; Kane 63'; Maguire 69'; Rice 87'	Attendance: 58,260; Referee: Cüneyt Çakır (Turkey)

8 September 2021 2022 FIFA WC Q	Hungary	2–1	Andorra
20:45 CEST	Á. Szalai 9' (pen.); Botka 18'	Report	Llovera 82'	Attendance: 46,240; Referee: Rade Obrenovič (Slovenia)

9 October 2021 2022 FIFA WC Q	Hungary	0–1	Albania
20:45 CEST		Report	Broja 80'	Attendance: 273; Referee: Carlos del Cerro Grande (Spain)

12 November 2021 2022 FIFA WC Q	Hungary	4–0	San Marino
20:45 CET	Szoboszlai 6', 83'; Gazdag 22'; Vécsei 88'	Report		Attendance: 12,800; Referee: Filip Glova (Slovakia)

24 March 2022 Friendly match	Hungary	0–1	Serbia
19:30 CET		Report	Zs. Nagy 35' (o.g.)	Attendance: 30,000; Referee: Filip Glova (Slovakia)

4 June 2022 2022–23 UEFA NL	Hungary	1–0	England
18:00 CEST	Szoboszlai 66' (pen.)	Report		Attendance: 26,935; Referee: Artur Dias (Portugal)

11 June 2022 2022–23 UEFA NL	Hungary	1–1	Germany
20:45 CEST	Zs. Nagy 6'	Report	Hofmann 9'	Attendance: 55,948; Referee: José María Sánchez Martínez (Spain)

26 September 2022 2022–23 UEFA NL	Hungary	0–2	Italy
20:45 CEST		Report	Raspadori 27'; Dimarco 52'	Attendance: 57,300; Referee: Benoît Bastien (France)

20 November 2022 Friendly match	Hungary	2–1	Greece
20:15 CET	Sallai 15'; Kalmár 90+4'	Report	Bakasetas 35' (pen.)	Attendance: 50,983; Referee: Daniele Chiffi (Italy)

23 March 2023 Friendly match	Hungary	1–0	Estonia
19:30 CET	Ádám 41'	Report		Attendance: 41,000; Referee: Walter Altmann (Austria)

27 March 2023 Euro 2024 Q	Hungary	3–0	Bulgaria
20:45 CEST	Vécsei 7'; Szoboszlai 26'; Ádám 39'	Report		Attendance: 53,000; Referee: Halil Umut Meler (Turkey)

20 June 2023 Euro 2024 Q	Hungary	2–0	Lithuania
20:45 CEST	Varga 32'; Sallai 83'	Report		Attendance: 58,274; Referee: António Nobre (Portugal)

10 September 2023 Friendly match	Hungary	1–1	Czech Republic
18:00 CEST	Sallai 52'	Report	Jurečka 63'	Attendance: 54,444; Referee: Igor Pajać (Croatia)

14 October 2023 Euro 2024 Q	Hungary	2–1	Serbia
20:45 CEST	Varga 20'; Sallai 34'	Report	Pavlović 33'	Attendance: 58,215; Referee: François Letexier (France)

19 November 2023 Euro 2024 Q	Hungary	3–1	Montenegro
15:00 CET	Szoboszlai 66' 68'; Nagy 90+3'	Report	Rubežić 36'	Attendance: 59,600; Referee: Danny Makkelie (Netherlands)

22 March 2024 Friendly match	Hungary	1–0	Turkey
20:45 CET	Szoboszlai 48' (pen.)	Report		Attendance: 54,444; Referee: Bartosz Frankowski (Poland)

26 March 2024 Friendly match	Hungary	2–0	Kosovo
19:00 CEST	Szoboszlai 58'; Nagy 86'	Report		Attendance: 57,000; Referee: Ovidiu Hațegan (Romania)

10 September 2024 2024–25 UEFA NL	Hungary	0–0	Bosnia and Herzegovina
20:45 CEST		Report		Attendance: 46,443; Referee: Marco Guida (Italy)

11 October 2024 2024–25 UEFA NL	Hungary	1–1	Netherlands
20:45 CEST	Sallai 32'	Report	Dumfries 83'	Attendance: 55,300; Referee: Lukas Fähndrich (Switzerland)

19 November 2024 2024–25 UEFA NL	Hungary	1–1	Germany
20:45 CET	Szoboszlai 90+9' (pen.)	Report	Nmecha 76'	Attendance: 53,212; Referee: Duje Strukan (Croatia)

23 March 2025 2024–25 UEFA NL PO	Hungary	0–3	Turkey
18:00 CET		Report	Çalhanoğlu 37' (pen.); Güler 39'; Bardakcı 90'	Attendance: 59,236; Referee: Felix Zwayer (Germany)

6 June 2025 Friendly match	Hungary	0–2	Sweden
19:30 CEST		Report	Nygren 49'; Ayari 65'	Attendance: 55,000; Referee: Atilla Karaoğlan (Turkey)

9 September 2025 2026 FIFA WC Q	Hungary	2–3	Portugal
20:45 CEST	Varga 21', 84'	Report	B. Silva 36'; Ronaldo 58' (pen.); Cancelo 86'	Attendance: 61,473; Referee: Erik Lambrechts (Belgium)

11 October 2025 2026 FIFA WC Q	Hungary	2–0	Armenia
18:00 CEST	Lukács 56'; Gruber 90+4'	Report		Attendance: 57,285; Referee: Chris Kavanagh (England)

16 November 2025 2026 FIFA WC Q	Hungary	2–3	Republic of Ireland
15:00 CET	Lukács 3'; Varga 37'	Report	Parrott 15' (pen.), 80', 90+6'	Attendance: 59,411; Referee: Espen Eskås (Norway)

28 March 2026 Friendly match	Hungary	1–0	Slovenia
18:00 CET	Schön 79'	Report		Attendance: 50,252; Referee: Rohit Saggi (Norway)

31 March 2026 Friendly match	Hungary	0–0	Greece
19:00 CEST		Report		Attendance: 54,849; Referee: Florian Badstübner (Germany)

5 June 2026 Friendly match	Hungary	2–1	Finland
19:45 CEST	Varga 26' 43'	Report	Miettinen 71'	Attendance: 53,148; Referee: Čulina Ante (Croatia)

25 September 2026 2026–27 UEFA NL	Hungary	0–1	Ukraine
20:45 CEST		Report	Sikan 42'	Attendance: 56,796; Referee: Jarred Gillett (England)

2 October 2026 2026–27 UEFA NL	Hungary	1–0	Georgia
20:45 CEST	Kerkez 35'	Report		Attendance: 52,870; Referee: Srđan Jovanović (Serbia)

17 November 2026 2026–27 UEFA NL	Hungary	1–1	Northern Ireland
20:45 CET	Varga 35'	Report	Devenny 65'	Attendance: 55,276; Referee: Marco Guida (Italy)

Note:

- UEFA NL = UEFA Nations League
- Q = Qualification
- PO = Play-off
- FIFA WC = FIFA World Cup

== Statistics of Hungary national football team matches ==
As of 21 November 2026

Match type	Pld	W	D	L	GF	GA
Competition	28	11	8	9	39	35
Friendly	11	6	2	3	11	8
Total	39	17	10	12	50	43

Top scorers:
(Hungary) Dominik Szoboszlai (10 goals)

(Hungary) Barnabás Varga (8 goals)

(Hungary) Roland Sallai (7 goals)

== Concerts ==
List of concerts, showing date, artist, opening act and tour name
Date	Artist(s)	Tour	Attendance
June 15, 2022	Red Hot Chili Peppers	Global Stadium Tour	47,787
July 11, 2023	Rammstein	Rammstein Stadium Tour	96,971
July 12, 2023	Rammstein	Rammstein Stadium Tour	96,971
July 19, 2023	Guns N' Roses	Guns N' Roses 2023 Tour	
July 28, 2023	Depeche Mode	Memento Mori World Tour	47,613
May 24, 2024	Azahriah	—	138,980
May 25, 2024	Azahriah	—	138,980
May 26, 2024	Azahriah	—	138,980
June 1, 2024	Hungária	—	
June 8, 2024	Halott Pénz	—	
June 16, 2024	Coldplay	Music of the Spheres World Tour	166,771
June 18, 2024	Coldplay	Music of the Spheres World Tour	166,771
June 19, 2024	Coldplay	Music of the Spheres World Tour	166,771
July 20, 2024	Ed Sheeran	+–=÷× Tour	58,747
June 14, 2025	Imagine Dragons	Loom World Tour	
June 15, 2025	Imagine Dragons	Loom World Tour	
July 15, 2025	Guns N' Roses	Because What You Want & What You Get Are Two Completely Different Things Tour	43,176
June 11, 2026	Metallica	M72 World Tour	150,000
June 13, 2026	Metallica	M72 World Tour	150,000
July 21, 2026	Pitbull	I'm Back Tour	

== Public transport ==
Metro:
Tram: 1, 1A

== Gallery ==
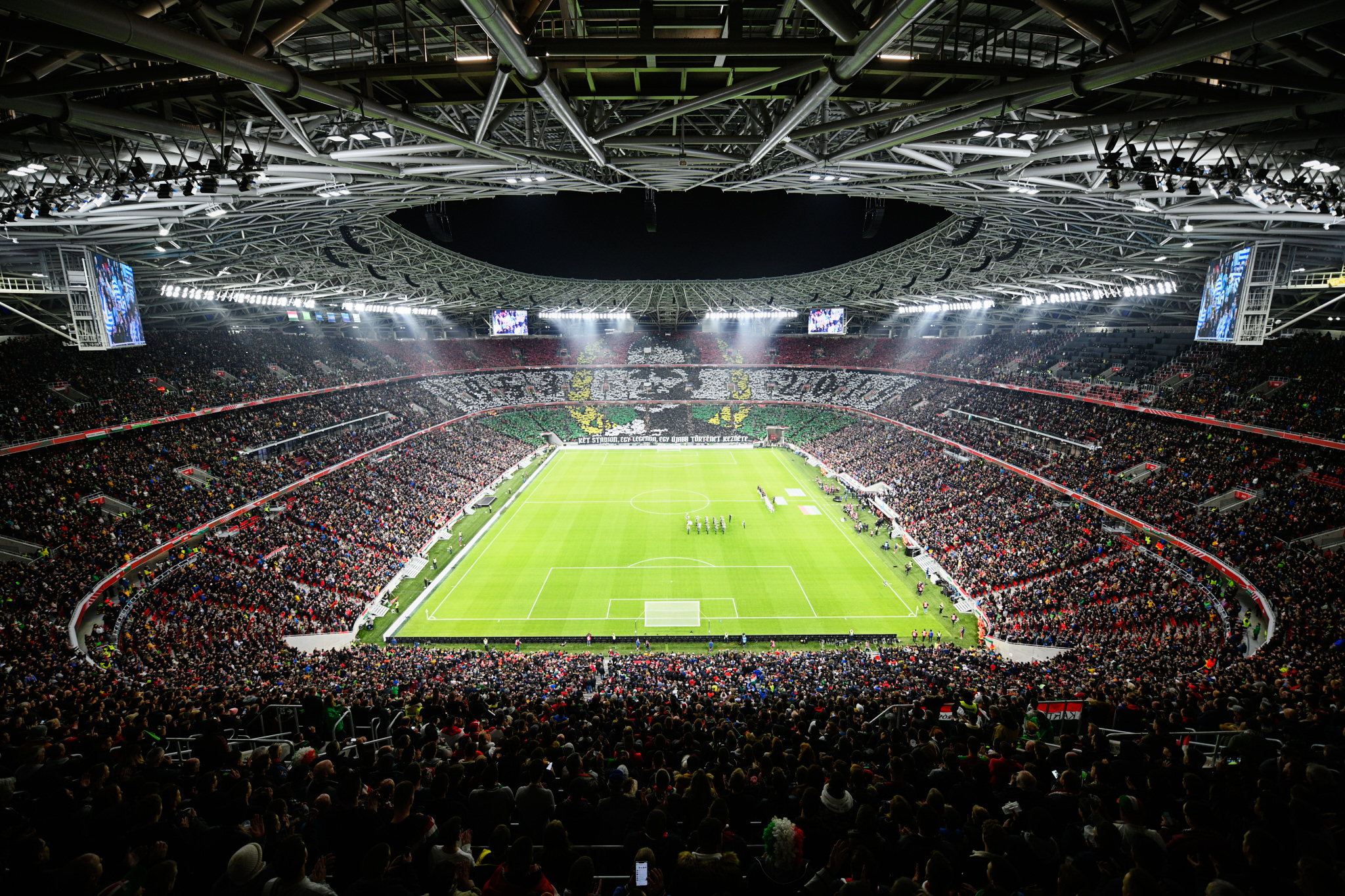
Hungary-Uruguay

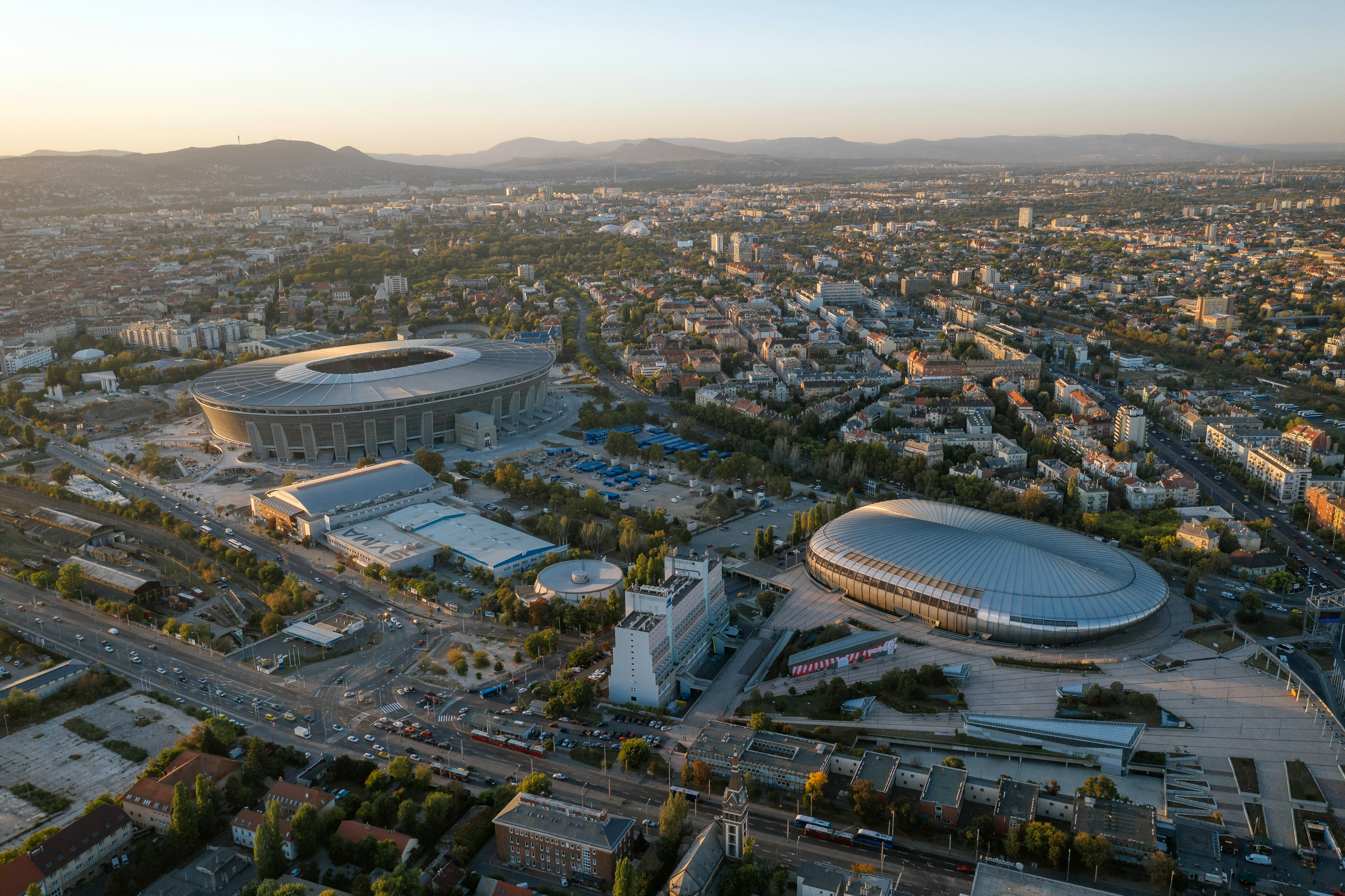
Bird's-eye view

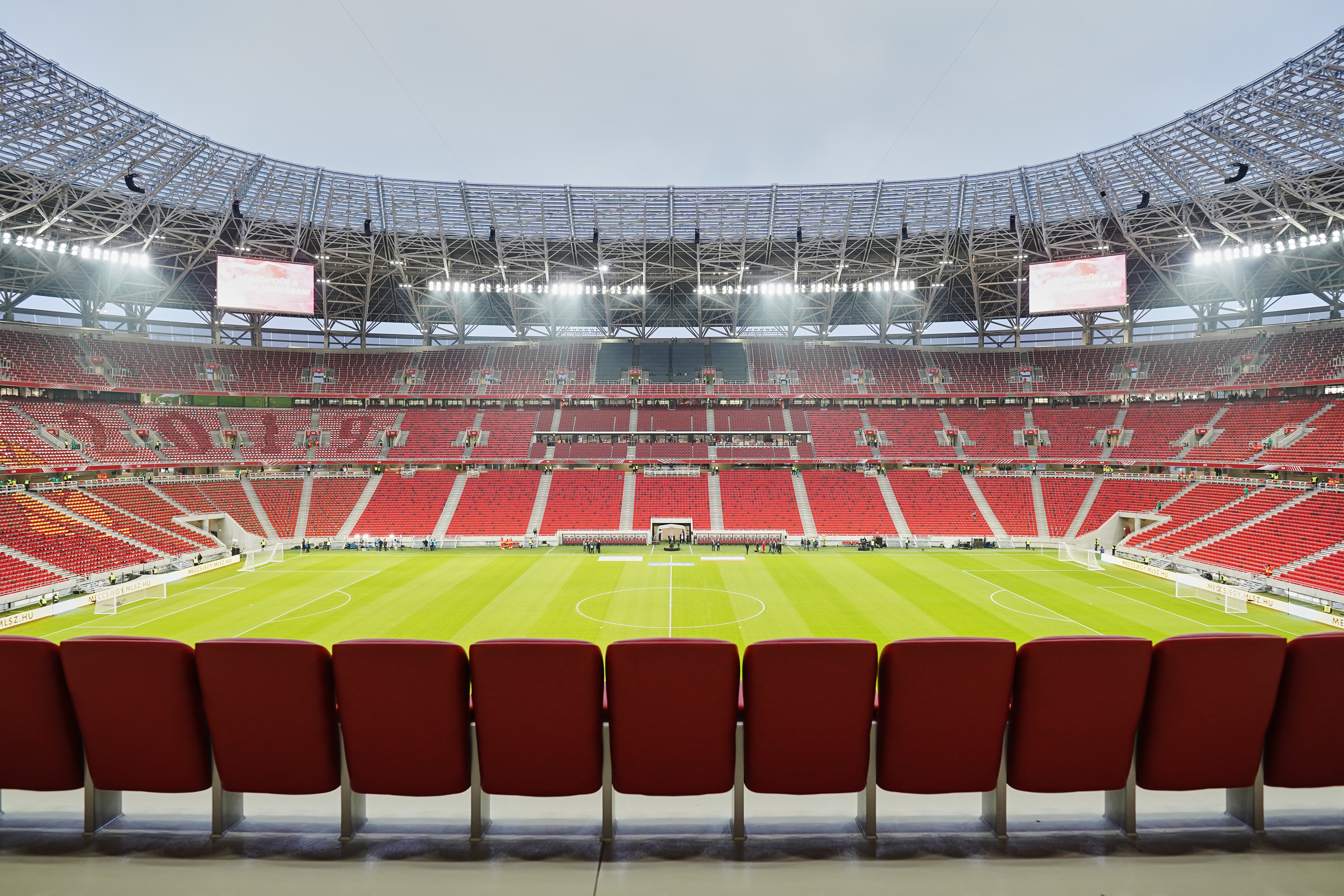
Interior

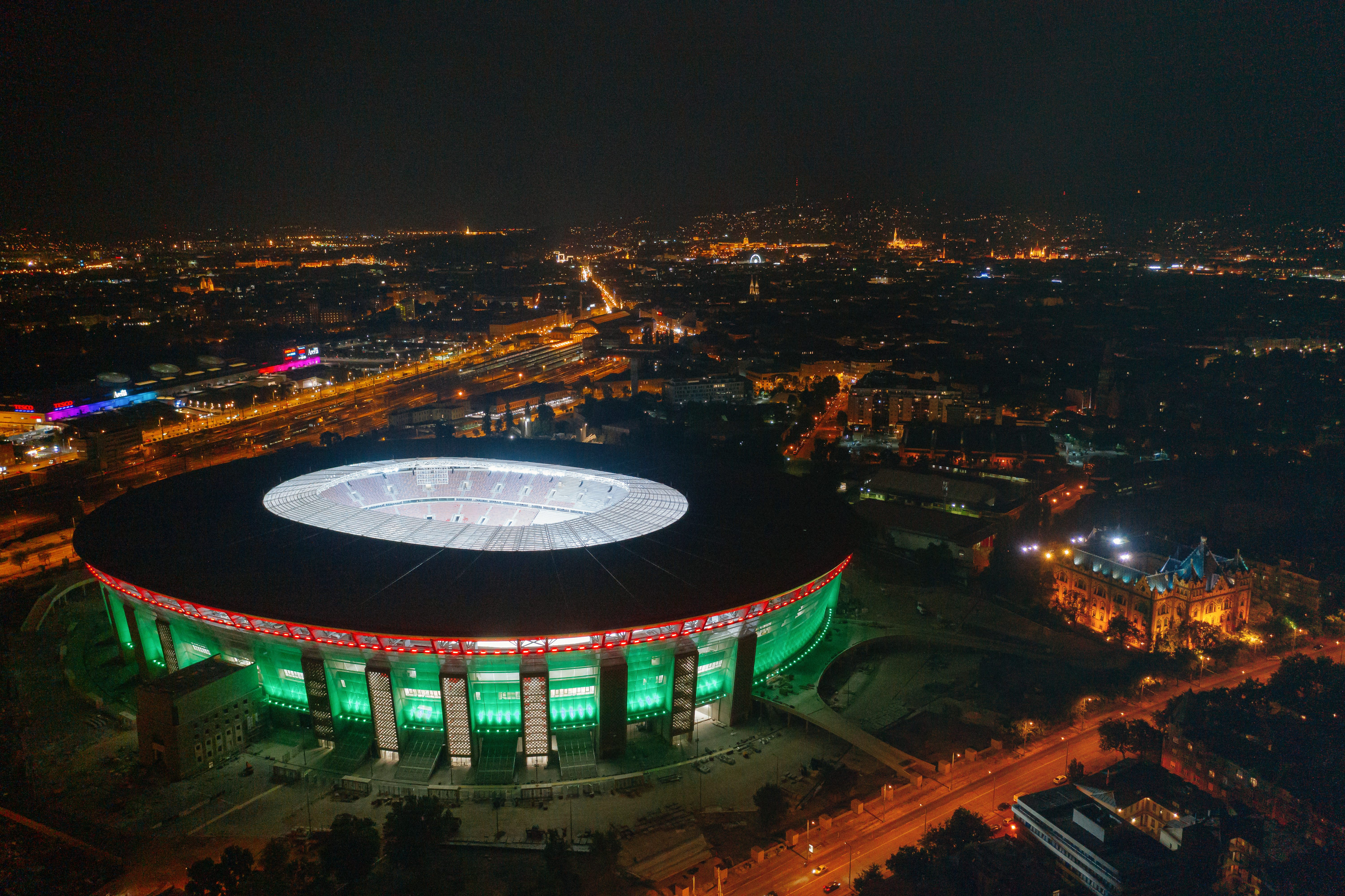
Exterior bird's-eye view

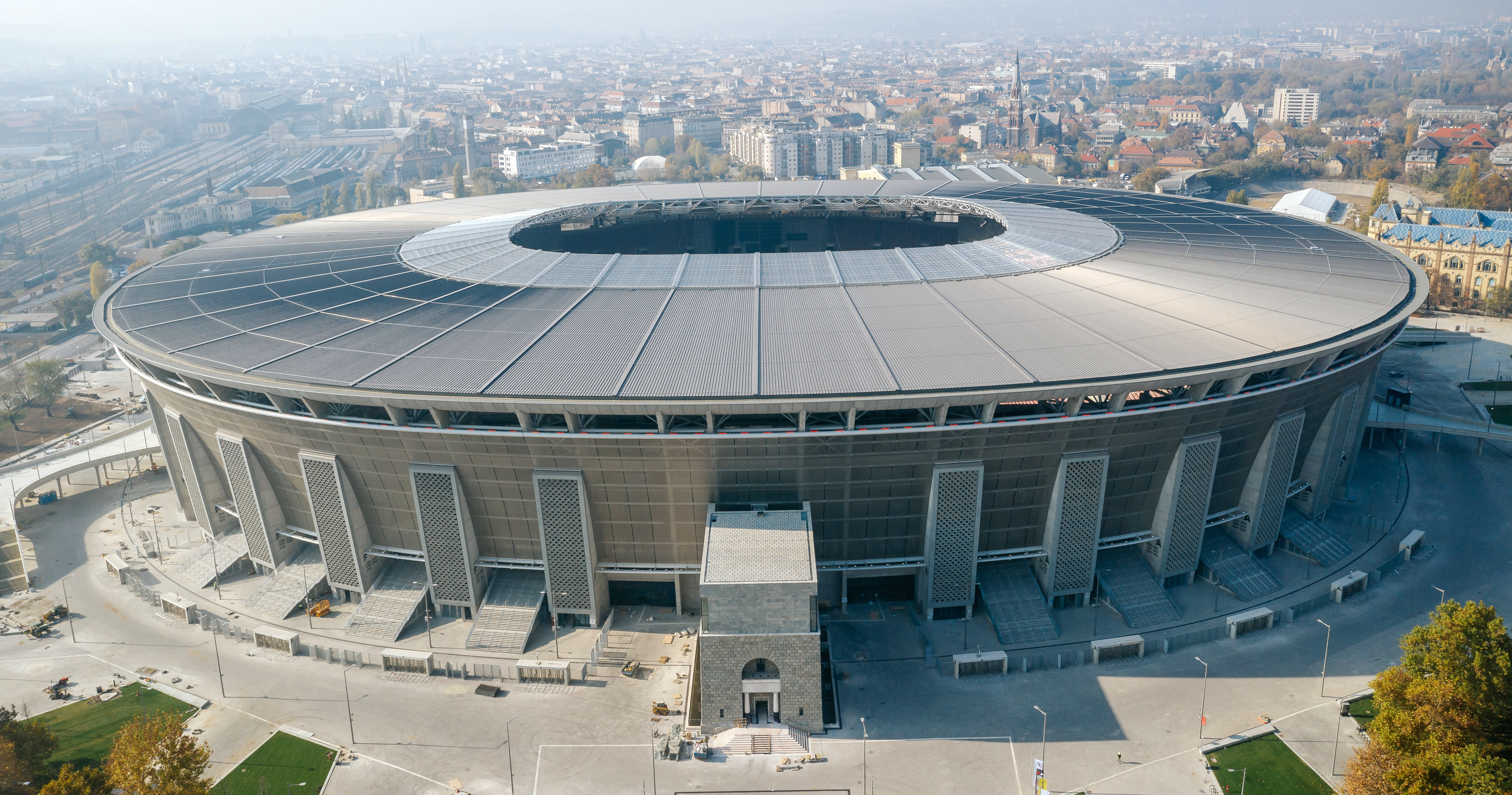
Exterior

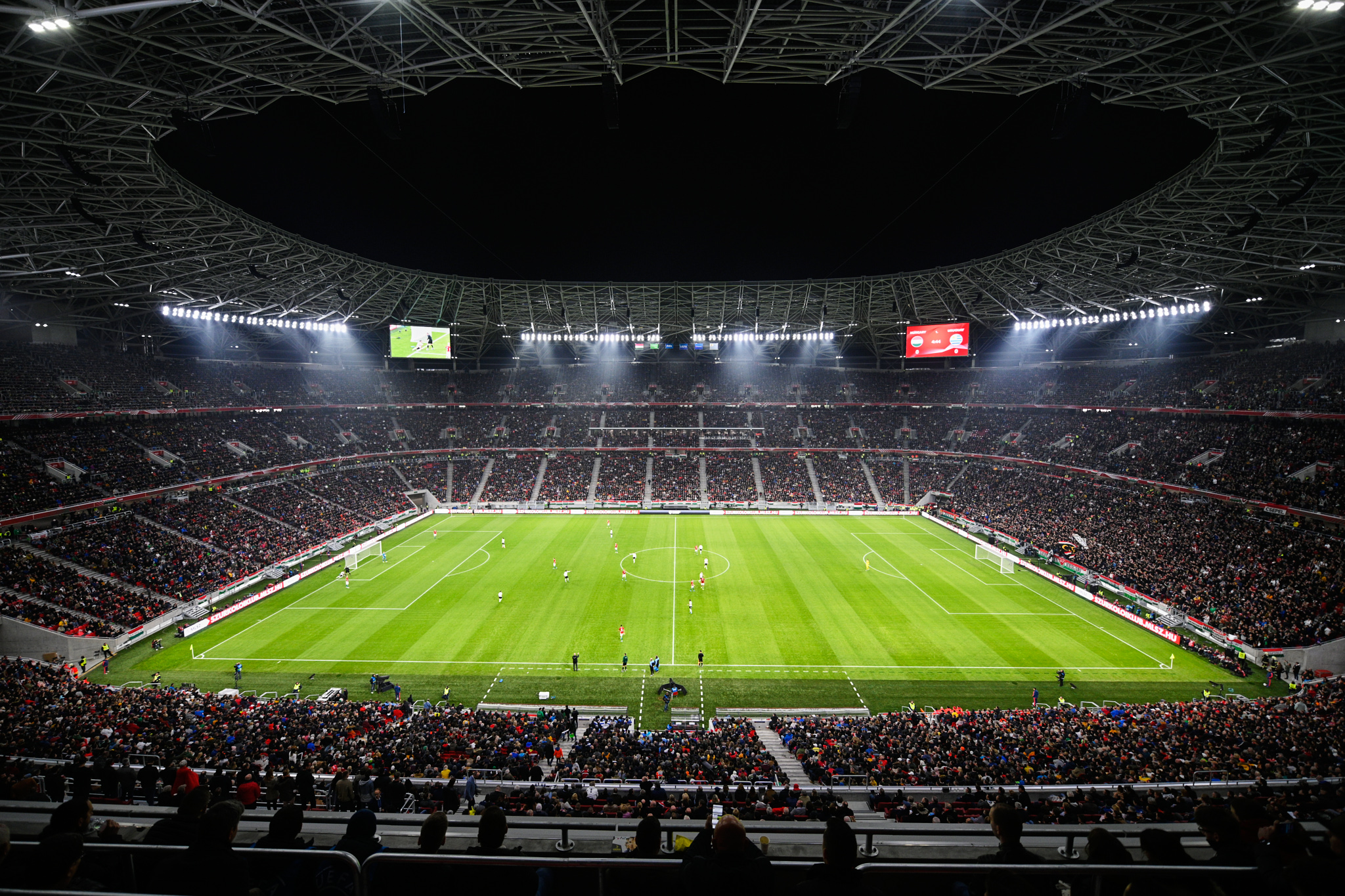
Hungary-Uruguay, November 2019 inauguration game

== See also ==
- Arena Națională
- Ernst-Happel-Stadion
- Kazimierz Górski National Stadium
- Olimpiyskiy
- Luzhniki Stadium
- Wembley Stadium
- Lists of stadiums

Events
Preceded by Vodafone Park; Istanbul	UEFA Super Cup; Match venue 2020	Succeeded by Windsor Park; Belfast
Preceded by Estadio Pizjuán; Seville	UEFA Europa League; Final venue 2023	Succeeded by Aviva Stadium; Dublin
Preceded by Allianz Arena; Munich	UEFA Champions League; Final venue 2026	Succeeded by Metropolitano Stadium; Madrid
Preceded by Juventus Stadium; Turin	UEFA Conference League; Final venue 2029	Succeeded by TBD; TBD
