= Max Llovera =

Andorran footballer

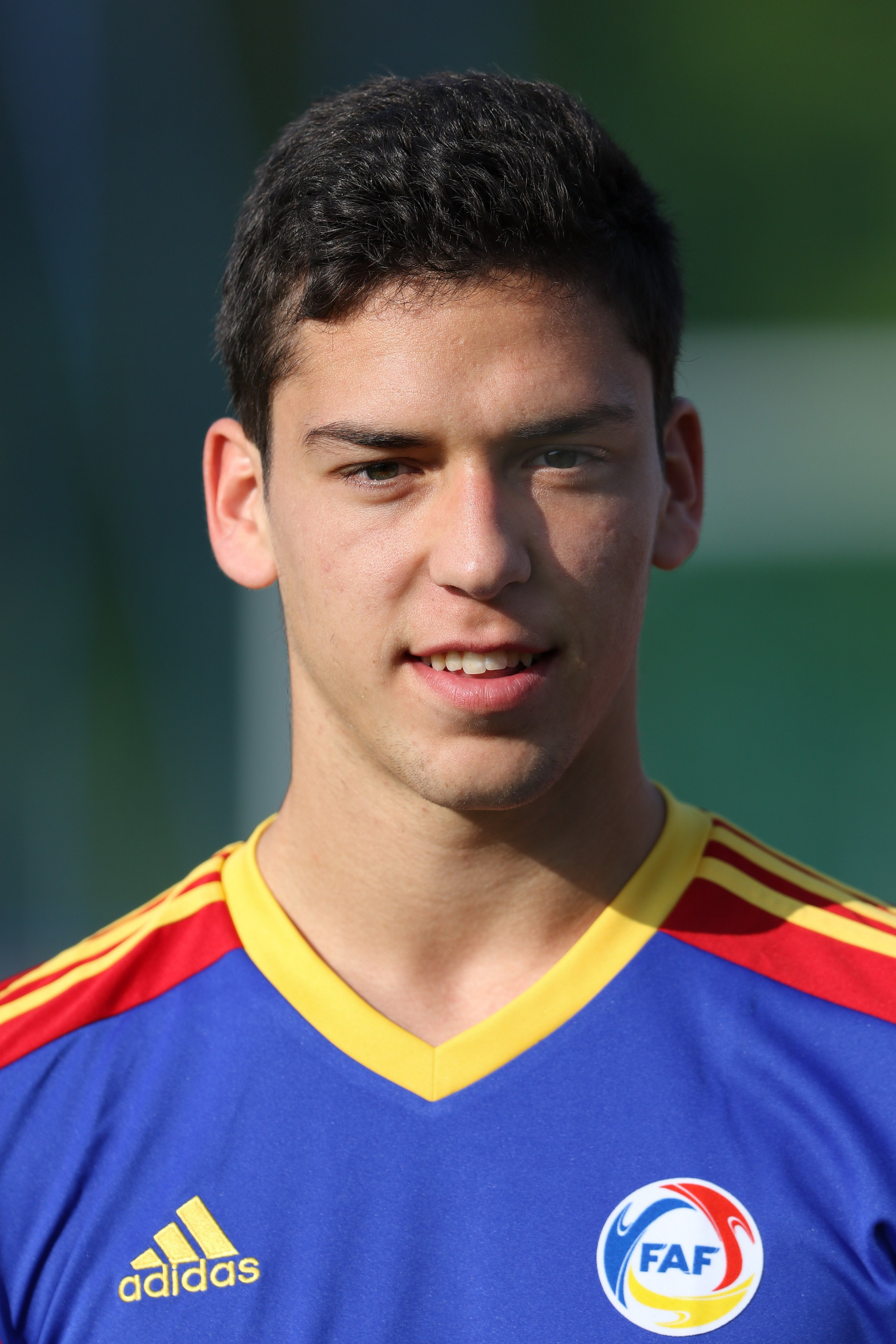
- Llovera with Andorra in 2016

Personal information
- Full name: Max Llovera González-Adrio
- Date of birth: 8 January 1997 (age 29)
- Place of birth: Andorra la Vella, Andorra
- Height: 1.80 m (5 ft 11 in)
- Position: Centre back

Team information
- Current team: San Cristóbal
- Number: 5

Youth career
- FC Andorra
- 2011–2013: Lleida Esportiu
- 2013–2014: Espanyol
- 2014–2016: Lleida Esportiu

Senior career*
Years	Team	Apps	(Gls)
2015–2018	Lleida Esportiu B	43	(2)
2016–2018	Lleida Esportiu	17	(0)
2018	→ Horta (loan)	2	(0)
2019	Santboià	19	(0)
2019–2021	Granollers	35	(0)
2021–	San Cristóbal	131	(2)

International career^{‡}
2011–2013	Andorra U17	8	(0)
2013–2014	Andorra U19	6	(0)
2015–2018	Andorra U21	8	(0)
2015–	Andorra	96	(1)
- * Club domestic league appearances and goals as of 9 May 2026 ‡ National team caps and goals as of 15 November 2026

Max Llovera González-Adrio (born 8 January 1997) is an Andorran professional footballer who plays as a central defender for Spanish club CP San Cristóbal.

== Career ==
=== FC Santboià ===
On 20 December 2018 FC Santboià confirmed, that Llovera had signed for the club.

=== International career ===
Llovera debuted for Andorra on 3 September 2015.

=== International goals ===
Scores and results list Austria's goal tally first, score column indicates score after each Llovera goal.

List of international goals scored by Max Llovera
No.	Date	Venue	Opponent	Score	Result	Competition
1.	8 September 2021	Puskás Aréna, Budapest, Hungary	Hungary	1–2	1–2	2022 FIFA World Cup qualification
