= Albert Alavedra =

Andorran footballer

Personal information
- Full name: Albert Alavedra Jiménez
- Date of birth: 26 February 1999 (age 27)
- Place of birth: Castellbell i el Vilar, Spain
- Height: 1.85 m (6 ft 1 in)
- Position: Centre-back

Youth career
- 2014–2018: Espanyol
- 2016–2017: → Sabadell (loan)

Senior career*
Years	Team	Apps	(Gls)
2018–2019	Logroñés B	20	(3)
2019–2020	Algeciras	0	(0)
2020	Manresa	4	(0)
2020	Cerdanyola	0	(0)
2020–2021	Calahorra B	6	(0)
2021–2022	Pobla Mafumet	34	(2)
2022–2023	Badalona	14	(1)
2023	Primorje	7	(0)
2023	FK Vardar	2	(0)

International career^{‡}
2014–2015	Andorra U17	6	(0)
2015–2017	Andorra U19	5	(0)
2016–2020	Andorra U21	13	(0)
2020–2023	Andorra	28	(0)
- * Club domestic league appearances and goals as of 2 September 2023 ‡ National team caps and goals as of 12 September 2023

Albert Alavedra Jiménez (born 26 February 1999) is a former Andorran footballer who played as a centre-back.

== Early life ==
Alavedra was born in Castellbell i el Vilar, near Manresa to an Andorran mother.

== International career ==
Alavedra made his international debut for Andorra on 13 October 2020 in the UEFA Nations League against the Faroe Islands.

== Career statistics ==
=== International ===
As of 13 October 2020

Andorra
Year	Apps	Goals
2020	1	0
Total	1	0
