= UEFA Euro 2020 Group F =

Portion of the championship series

Group F of UEFA Euro 2020 took place from 15 to 23 June 2021 in Budapest's Puskás Aréna and Munich's Allianz Arena. The group contained host nations Hungary and Germany, alongside the two UEFA Euro 2016 finalists: defending champions Portugal and runners-up (and 2018 FIFA World Cup winners) France. It was the first time since the 2014 FIFA World Cup where the previous finalists met each other in the group stage of the next tournament.

That combination of teams led to the group being referred to as a "group of death". Despite Hungary being considered the weakest of the four, they kept a clean sheet for 84 minutes of their match against Portugal before losing 3–0, and led against France and twice against Germany before those matches finished as draws.

== Teams ==
Draw position	Team	Pot	Method of qualification	Date of qualification	Finals appearance	Last appearance	Previous best performance	Qualifying Rankings November 2019 (Note: The European Qualifiers overall rankings from November 2019 were used for seeding for the final draw.)	FIFA Rankings May 2021
F1	Hungary (host)	4	Play-off Path A winner	12 November 2020	4th	2016	Third place (1964)	31	37
F2	Portugal	3	Group B runner-up	17 November 2019	8th	2016	Winners (2016)	13	5
F3	France	2	Group H winner	14 November 2019	10th	2016	Winners (1984, 2000)	7	2
F4	Germany (Note: From 1972 to 1988, Germany competed as West Germany.) (host)	1	Group C winner	16 November 2019	13th	2016	Winners (1972, 1980, 1996)	4	12

== Standings ==
Pos	Team	Pld	W	D	L	GF	GA	GD	Pts	Qualification
1	France	3	1	2	0	4	3	+1	5	Advance to knockout stage
2	Germany (H)	3	1	1	1	6	5	+1	4 (Note: Head-to-head result: Portugal 2–4 Germany.)	Advance to knockout stage
3	Portugal	3	1	1	1	7	6	+1	4	Advance to knockout stage
4	Hungary (H)	3	0	2	1	3	6	−3	2	

Source: UEFA
Rules for classification: Group stage tiebreakers
(H) Hosts
Notes:

In the round of 16,

- The winner of Group F, France, advanced to play the third-placed team of Group A, Switzerland.
- The runner-up of Group F, Germany, advanced to play the winner of Group D, England.
- The third-placed team of Group F, Portugal, advanced as one of the four best third-placed teams to play the winner of Group B, Belgium.

== Matches ==
=== Hungary vs Portugal ===
15 June 2021
18:00

Hungary	0–3	Portugal
	Report	Guerreiro 84'; Ronaldo 87' (pen.), 90+2'

Puskás Aréna, Budapest
Attendance: 55,662
Referee: Cüneyt Çakır (Turkey)

Hungary	Portugal

GK	1	Péter Gulácsi
CB	21	Endre Botka
CB	6	Willi Orbán	(yellow card) 86'
CB	4	Attila Szalai
DM	8	Ádám Nagy		(substituted off) 88'
RM	14	Gergő Lovrencsics
CM	15	László Kleinheisler		(substituted off) 78'
CM	13	András Schäfer		(substituted off) 65'
LM	5	Attila Fiola		(substituted off) 88'
CF	9	Ádám Szalai (c)
CF	20	Roland Sallai		(substituted off) 77'
Substitutions:
DF	7	Loïc Négo	(yellow card) 80'	(substituted on) 65'
FW	24	Szabolcs Schön		(substituted on) 77'
MF	18	Dávid Sigér		(substituted on) 78'
MF	19	Kevin Varga		(substituted on) 88'
MF	17	Roland Varga		(substituted on) 88'
Manager:
(Italy) Marco Rossi

GK	1	Rui Patrício
RB	2	Nélson Semedo
CB	4	Rúben Dias	(yellow card) 38'
CB	3	Pepe
LB	5	Raphaël Guerreiro
CM	13	Danilo Pereira
CM	14	William Carvalho		(substituted off) 81'
CM	11	Bruno Fernandes		(substituted off) 89'
RF	7	Cristiano Ronaldo (c)
CF	21	Diogo Jota		(substituted off) 81'
LF	10	Bernardo Silva		(substituted off) 71'
Substitutions:
FW	15	Rafa Silva		(substituted on) 71'
MF	16	Renato Sanches		(substituted on) 81'
FW	9	André Silva		(substituted on) 81'
MF	8	João Moutinho		(substituted on) 89'
Manager:
Fernando Santos

Man of the Match:
Cristiano Ronaldo (Portugal)

Assistant referees:
Bahattin Duran (Turkey)
Tarık Ongun (Turkey)
Fourth official:
Sandro Schärer (Switzerland)
Reserve assistant referee:
Stéphane De Almeida (Switzerland)
Video assistant referee:
Massimiliano Irrati (Italy)
Assistant video assistant referees:
Paolo Valeri (Italy)
Filippo Meli (Italy)
Paweł Gil (Poland)

=== France vs Germany ===
15 June 2021
21:00

France	1–0	Germany
Hummels 20' (o.g.)	Report

Allianz Arena, Munich
Attendance: 13,000
Referee: Carlos del Cerro Grande (Spain)

France	Germany

GK	1	Hugo Lloris (c)
RB	2	Benjamin Pavard
CB	4	Raphaël Varane
CB	3	Presnel Kimpembe
LB	21	Lucas Hernandez
DM	13	N'Golo Kanté
CM	14	Adrien Rabiot	(substituted off) 90+4'
CM	6	Paul Pogba
AM	7	Antoine Griezmann
CF	19	Karim Benzema	(substituted off) 89'
CF	10	Kylian Mbappé
Substitutions:
MF	12	Corentin Tolisso	(substituted on) 89'
FW	11	Ousmane Dembélé	(substituted on) 90+4'
Manager:
Didier Deschamps

GK	1	Manuel Neuer (c)
CB	4	Matthias Ginter		(substituted off) 88'
CB	5	Mats Hummels
CB	2	Antonio Rüdiger
RM	6	Joshua Kimmich	(yellow card) 7'
CM	21	İlkay Gündoğan
CM	8	Toni Kroos
LM	20	Robin Gosens		(substituted off) 88'
AM	7	Kai Havertz		(substituted off) 74'
AM	25	Thomas Müller
CF	10	Serge Gnabry		(substituted off) 74'
Substitutions:
FW	11	Timo Werner		(substituted on) 74'
MF	19	Leroy Sané		(substituted on) 74'
FW	9	Kevin Volland		(substituted on) 88'
DF	23	Emre Can		(substituted on) 88'
Manager:
Joachim Löw

Man of the Match:
Paul Pogba (France)

Assistant referees:
Juan Carlos Yuste Jiménez (Spain)
Roberto Alonso Fernández (Spain)
Fourth official:
Srđan Jovanović (Serbia)
Reserve assistant referee:
Uroš Stojković (Serbia)
Video assistant referee:
Juan Martínez Munuera (Spain)
Assistant video assistant referees:
José María Sánchez Martínez (Spain)
Íñigo Prieto López de Cerain (Spain)
Alejandro Hernández Hernández (Spain)

=== Hungary vs France ===
19 June 2021
15:00

Hungary	1–1	France
Fiola 45+2'	Report	Griezmann 66'

Puskás Aréna, Budapest
Attendance: 55,998
Referee: Michael Oliver (England)

Hungary	France

GK	1	Péter Gulácsi
CB	21	Endre Botka	(yellow card) 52'
CB	6	Willi Orbán
CB	4	Attila Szalai
DM	8	Ádám Nagy
RM	7	Loïc Négo
CM	15	László Kleinheisler		(substituted off) 84'
CM	13	András Schäfer		(substituted off) 75'
LM	5	Attila Fiola
CF	9	Ádám Szalai (c)		(substituted off) 26'
CF	20	Roland Sallai
Substitutions:
FW	23	Nemanja Nikolić		(substituted on) 26'
MF	10	Tamás Cseri		(substituted on) 75'
DF	14	Gergő Lovrencsics		(substituted on) 84'
Manager:
(Italy) Marco Rossi

GK	1	Hugo Lloris (c)
RB	2	Benjamin Pavard	(yellow card) 10'
CB	4	Raphaël Varane
CB	3	Presnel Kimpembe
LB	18	Lucas Digne
DM	13	N'Golo Kanté
CM	6	Paul Pogba		(substituted off) 76'
CM	14	Adrien Rabiot		(substituted off) 57'
AM	7	Antoine Griezmann
CF	19	Karim Benzema		(substituted off) 76'
CF	10	Kylian Mbappé
Substitutions:
FW	11	Ousmane Dembélé		(substituted on) 57'	(substituted off) 87'
MF	12	Corentin Tolisso		(substituted on) 76'
FW	9	Olivier Giroud		(substituted on) 76'
MF	8	Thomas Lemar			(substituted on) 87'
Manager:
Didier Deschamps

Man of the Match:
László Kleinheisler (Hungary)

Assistant referees:
Stuart Burt (England)
Simon Bennett (England)
Fourth official:
Bartosz Frankowski (Poland)
Reserve assistant referee:
Marcin Boniek (Poland)
Video assistant referee:
Chris Kavanagh (England)
Assistant video assistant referees:
Kevin Blom (Netherlands)
Lee Betts (England)
Pol van Boekel (Netherlands)

=== Portugal vs Germany ===
19 June 2021
18:00

Portugal	2–4	Germany
Ronaldo 15'; Jota 67'	Report	Dias 35' (o.g.); Guerreiro 39' (o.g.); Havertz 51'; Gosens 60'

Allianz Arena, Munich
Attendance: 12,926
Referee: Anthony Taylor (England)

Portugal	Germany

GK	1	Rui Patrício
RB	2	Nélson Semedo
CB	4	Rúben Dias
CB	3	Pepe
LB	5	Raphaël Guerreiro
CM	14	William Carvalho	(substituted off) 58'
CM	13	Danilo Pereira
RW	10	Bernardo Silva	(substituted off) 46'
AM	11	Bruno Fernandes	(substituted off) 64'
LW	21	Diogo Jota	(substituted off) 83'
CF	7	Cristiano Ronaldo (c)
Substitutions:
MF	16	Renato Sanches	(substituted on) 46'
FW	15	Rafa Silva	(substituted on) 58'
MF	8	João Moutinho	(substituted on) 64'
FW	9	André Silva	(substituted on) 83'
Manager:
Fernando Santos

GK	1	Manuel Neuer (c)
CB	4	Matthias Ginter	(yellow card) 77'
CB	5	Mats Hummels		(substituted off) 62'
CB	2	Antonio Rüdiger
RM	6	Joshua Kimmich
CM	21	İlkay Gündoğan		(substituted off) 73'
CM	8	Toni Kroos
LM	20	Robin Gosens		(substituted off) 62'
RW	7	Kai Havertz	(yellow card) 66'	(substituted off) 73'
LW	25	Thomas Müller
CF	10	Serge Gnabry		(substituted off) 87'
Substitutions:
DF	3	Marcel Halstenberg		(substituted on) 62'
DF	23	Emre Can		(substituted on) 62'
MF	18	Leon Goretzka		(substituted on) 73'
DF	15	Niklas Süle		(substituted on) 73'
MF	19	Leroy Sané		(substituted on) 87'
Manager:
Joachim Löw

Man of the Match:
Robin Gosens (Germany)

Assistant referees:
Gary Beswick (England)
Adam Nunn (England)
Fourth official:
Srđan Jovanović (Serbia)
Reserve assistant referee:
Uroš Stojković (Serbia)
Video assistant referee:
Stuart Attwell (England)
Assistant video assistant referees:
Juan Martínez Munuera (Spain)
Íñigo Prieto López de Cerain (Spain)
Alejandro Hernández Hernández (Spain)

=== Portugal vs France ===
23 June 2021
21:00

Portugal	2–2	France
Ronaldo 31' (pen.), 60' (pen.)	Report	Benzema 45+2' (pen.), 47'

Puskás Aréna, Budapest
Attendance: 54,886
Referee: Antonio Mateu Lahoz (Spain)

Portugal	France

GK	1	Rui Patrício
RB	2	Nélson Semedo	(substituted off) 79'
CB	4	Rúben Dias
CB	3	Pepe
LB	5	Raphaël Guerreiro
CM	8	João Moutinho	(substituted off) 72'
CM	13	Danilo Pereira	(substituted off) 46'
CM	16	Renato Sanches	(substituted off) 88'
RF	10	Bernardo Silva	(substituted off) 72'
CF	7	Cristiano Ronaldo (c)
LF	21	Diogo Jota
Substitutions:
MF	26	João Palhinha	(substituted on) 46'
MF	11	Bruno Fernandes	(substituted on) 72'
MF	18	Rúben Neves	(substituted on) 72'
DF	20	Diogo Dalot	(substituted on) 79'
MF	24	Sérgio Oliveira	(substituted on) 88'
Manager:
Fernando Santos

GK	1	Hugo Lloris (c)	(yellow card) 27'
RB	25	Jules Koundé
CB	4	Raphaël Varane
CB	3	Presnel Kimpembe	(yellow card) 83'
LB	21	Lucas Hernandez	(yellow card) 36'	(substituted off) 46'
CM	6	Paul Pogba
CM	13	N'Golo Kanté
RW	12	Corentin Tolisso		(substituted off) 66'
AM	7	Antoine Griezmann	(yellow card) 40'	(substituted off) 87'
LW	10	Kylian Mbappé
CF	19	Karim Benzema
Substitutions:
DF	18	Lucas Digne		(substituted on) 46'	(substituted off) 52'
MF	14	Adrien Rabiot			(substituted on) 52'
MF	20	Kingsley Coman		(substituted on) 66'
MF	17	Moussa Sissoko		(substituted on) 87'
Manager:
Didier Deschamps

Man of the Match:
Karim Benzema (France)

Assistant referees:
Pau Cebrián Devís (Spain)
Roberto Díaz Pérez del Palomar (Spain)
Fourth official:
Ovidiu Hațegan (Romania)
Reserve assistant referee:
Sebastian Gheorghe (Romania)
Video assistant referee:
Alejandro Hernández Hernández (Spain)
Assistant video assistant referees:
José María Sánchez Martínez (Spain)
Íñigo Prieto López de Cerain (Spain)
Juan Martínez Munuera (Spain)

=== Germany vs Hungary ===
23 June 2021
21:00

Germany	2–2	Hungary
Havertz 66'; Goretzka 84'	Report	Ád. Szalai 11'; Schäfer 68'

Allianz Arena, Munich
Attendance: 12,413
Referee: Sergei Karasev (Russia)

Germany	Hungary

GK	1	Manuel Neuer (c)
CB	4	Matthias Ginter		(substituted off) 82'
CB	5	Mats Hummels
CB	2	Antonio Rüdiger
RM	6	Joshua Kimmich
CM	21	İlkay Gündoğan	(yellow card) 29'	(substituted off) 58'
CM	8	Toni Kroos
LM	20	Robin Gosens		(substituted off) 82'
AM	7	Kai Havertz		(substituted off) 67'
AM	19	Leroy Sané	(yellow card) 61'
CF	10	Serge Gnabry		(substituted off) 67'
Substitutions:
MF	18	Leon Goretzka		(substituted on) 58'
FW	11	Timo Werner		(substituted on) 67'
FW	25	Thomas Müller		(substituted on) 67'
MF	14	Jamal Musiala		(substituted on) 82'
FW	9	Kevin Volland		(substituted on) 82'
Manager:
Joachim Löw

GK	1	Péter Gulácsi
CB	21	Endre Botka	(yellow card) 28'
CB	6	Willi Orbán
CB	4	Attila Szalai
RWB	7	Loïc Négo
LWB	5	Attila Fiola	(yellow card) 66'	(substituted off) 88'
CM	15	László Kleinheisler		(substituted off) 88'
CM	8	Ádám Nagy
CM	13	András Schäfer
CF	9	Ádám Szalai (c)	(yellow card) 64'	(substituted off) 82'
CF	20	Roland Sallai		(substituted off) 75'
Substitutions:
FW	24	Szabolcs Schön		(substituted on) 75'
MF	19	Kevin Varga		(substituted on) 82'
FW	23	Nemanja Nikolić		(substituted on) 88'
DF	14	Gergő Lovrencsics		(substituted on) 88'
Manager:
(Italy) Marco Rossi

Man of the Match:
Joshua Kimmich (Germany)

Assistant referees:
Igor Demeshko (Russia)
Maksim Gavrilin (Russia)
Fourth official:
Danny Makkelie (Netherlands)
Reserve assistant referee:
Hessel Steegstra (Netherlands)
Video assistant referee:
Massimiliano Irrati (Italy)
Assistant video assistant referees:
Marco Di Bello (Italy)
Filippo Meli (Italy)
Paolo Valeri (Italy)

== Discipline ==
Fair play points were to be used as a tiebreaker if the head-to-head and overall records of teams were tied (and if a penalty shoot-out was not applicable as a tiebreaker). These were calculated based on yellow and red cards received in all group matches as follows:

- yellow card = 1 point
- red card as a result of two yellow cards = 3 points
- direct red card = 3 points
- yellow card followed by direct red card = 4 points

Only one of the above deductions was applied to a player in a single match.

Team	Match 1				Match 2				Match 3				Points
Team	Booked	(yellow card) (yellow-red card)	Sent off (straight red)	(yellow card) (red card)	Booked	(yellow card) (yellow-red card)	Sent off (straight red)	(yellow card) (red card)	Booked	(yellow card) (yellow-red card)	Sent off (straight red)	(yellow card) (red card)	Points
Portugal	1												−1
France					1				4				−5
Germany	1				2				2				−5
Hungary	2				1				3				−6

== See also ==
- France at the UEFA European Championship
- Germany at the UEFA European Championship
- Hungary at the UEFA European Championship
- Portugal at the UEFA European Championship
