= Martin Ádám =

Hungarian footballer (born 1994)

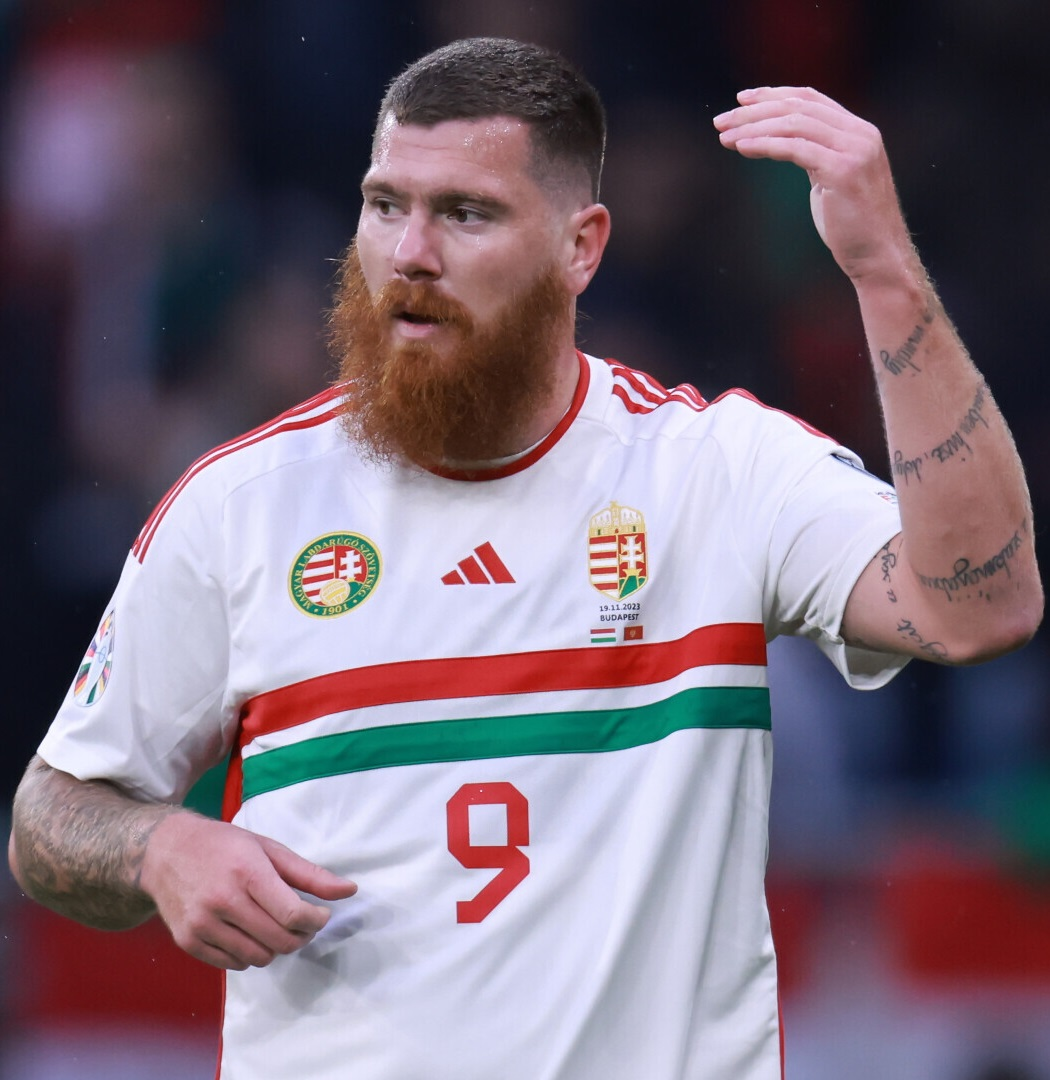
- Ádám playing for Hungary in 2023

Personal information
- Full name: Martin Ádám
- Date of birth: 6 November 1994 (age 32)
- Place of birth: Budapest, Hungary
- Height: 1.90 m (6 ft 3 in)
- Positions: Forward; winger

Team information
- Current team: Paks
- Number: 7

Youth career
- 2003–2008: Bordány
- 2008–2009: Tisza Volán
- 2009–2012: Vasas

Senior career*
Years	Team	Apps	(Gls)
2012–2019	Vasas	139	(27)
2018–2020	Kaposvári Rákóczi	43	(13)
2020–2022	Paks	60	(39)
2022–2024	Ulsan HD	54	(17)
2024	Asteras Tripolis	8	(0)
2024–2026	Paks	22	(4)
2026–	Szeged	1	(0)

International career^{‡}
2012	Hungary U18	2	(0)
2015	Hungary U21	2	(0)
2022–2024	Hungary	28	(3)
- * Club domestic league appearances and goals as of 6 September 2026 ‡ National team caps and goals as of 12 November 2024 (UTC)

Martin Ádám (born 6 November 1994) is a Hungarian professional footballer who plays as a forward or winger for Nemzeti Bajnokság club Paks.

== Club career ==
While playing for Paks, Ádám became the top goalscorer of the 2021–22 Nemzeti Bajnokság I season with 31 goals, becoming the first player to score over 30 goals in the league since 1980.

=== Ulsan ===
In July 2022, Ádám moved abroad for the first time in his career and signed for K League 1 team Ulsan Hyundai. He scored his first goal for Ulsan in his second appearance for the club, on 13 August, in a 4–0 victory over Daegu FC. With Ulsan, Ádám won two consecutive K League 1 titles, in 2022 and 2023. On 5 July 2024, his contract with the club was terminated. Later that month, on 21 July, he joined Greek side Asteras Tripolis by signing a contract until 2026.

=== Paks ===
On 18 December 2024, he returned to Paks. In an interview published on Nemzeri Sport, he said that he is happy to return home.

On 14 May 2025, he won the 2025 Magyar Kupa final with Paksi FC after beating Ferencvárosi TC 4–3 on penalty shoot-out.

== International career ==
On 23 March 2023, Ádám scored his first goal for the Hungary national team in a friendly match against Estonia. On 16 November 2023, he scored the first goal of the game against Bulgaria in the penultimate match of the UEFA Euro 2024 qualifying. The match ended in a 2–2 draw, securing Hungary qualification for the final tournament.

On 14 May 2024, Ádám was named in Hungary's squad for UEFA Euro 2024. He appeared as a substitute in all three of the team's Group A matches, playing a total of 42 minutes.

== Personal life ==
Ádám met his wife Gitta in primary school. They have a son, Konor, and live in Forráskút.

During UEFA Euro 2024, Ádám attracted the attention of international fans and media due to his physical appearance, being referred to as an "absolute unit" and nicknamed the "Hungarian Viking".

== Career statistics ==
=== Club ===
As of match played 12 September 2026

Appearances and goals by club, season and competition
Club	Season	League			National cup (Note: Includes Magyar Kupa, Korean FA Cup, Greek Football Cup)		Continental		Total	
Club	Season	Division	Apps	Goals	Apps	Goals	Apps	Goals	Apps	Goals
Vasas	2012–13	Nemzeti Bajnokság II	11	2	2	0	—		13	2
Vasas	2013–14	Nemzeti Bajnokság II	18	4	—		—		18	4
Vasas	2014–15	Nemzeti Bajnokság II	23	7	—		—		23	7
Vasas	2015–16	Nemzeti Bajnokság I	21	2	1	0	—		22	2
Vasas	2016–17	Nemzeti Bajnokság I	24	7	6	1	—		30	8
Vasas	2017–18	Nemzeti Bajnokság I	27	2	1	0	2 (Note: Appearances in UEFA Europa League)	0	30	2
Vasas	2018–19	Nemzeti Bajnokság II	15	3	2	3	—		17	6
Vasas	Total		139	27	12	4	2	0	153	31
Kaposvár	2018–19	Nemzeti Bajnokság II	13	8	1	0	—		14	8
Kaposvár	2019–20	Nemzeti Bajnokság I	30	5	2	1	—		32	6
Kaposvár	Total		43	13	3	1	—		46	14
Paks	2020–21	Nemzeti Bajnokság I	28	8	3	0	—		31	8
Paks	2021–22	Nemzeti Bajnokság I	32	31	3	0	—		35	31
Paks	Total		60	39	6	0	—		66	39
Ulsan HD	2022	K League 1	14	9	1	0	—		15	9
Ulsan HD	2023	K League 1	30	5	2	2	5 (Note: Appearances in AFC Champions League)	5	37	12
Ulsan HD	2024	K League 1	10	3	0	0	5	0	15	3
Ulsan HD	Total		54	17	3	2	10	5	67	24
Asteras Tripolis	2024–25	Super League Greece	8	0	1	2	—		9	2
Paks	2024–25	Nemzeti Bajnokság I	9	2	3	0	—		12	2
Paks	2025–26	Nemzeti Bajnokság I	13	2	1	1	—		14	3
Paks	Total		22	4	4	1	—		26	5
Szeged	2026–27	Nemzeti Bajnokság II	1	0	1	1	—		2	1
Career total			327	100	30	11	12	5	369	116

=== International ===
As of match played 12 November 2024

Appearances and goals by national team and year
National team	Year	Apps	Goals
Hungary	2022	10	0
Hungary	2023	9	3
Hungary	2024	9	0
Total		28	3

Scores and results list Hungary's goal tally first, score column indicates score after each Ádám goal.

List of international goals scored by Martin Ádám
No.	Date	Venue	Opponent	Score	Result	Competition
1	23 March 2023	Puskás Aréna, Budapest, Hungary	Estonia	1–0	1–0	Friendly
2	27 March 2023	Puskás Aréna, Budapest, Hungary	Bulgaria	3–0	3–0	UEFA Euro 2024 qualifying
3	16 November 2023	Vasil Levski National Stadium, Sofia, Bulgaria	Bulgaria	1–0	2–2	UEFA Euro 2024 qualifying

== Honours ==
Vasas

- Magyar Kupa runner-up: 2016–17

Paks

- Magyar Kupa: 2024–25; runner-up: 2021–22

Ulsan Hyundai

- K League 1: 2022, 2023

Individual

- Nemzeti Bajnokság I top scorer: 2021–22
