= Erik Lambrechts =

Belgian football referee

- Born: September 17, 1984 (age 42); Leuven, Belgium
- Occupation: Football referee
- Years active: 2002–

Erik Lambrechts (Leuven, 17 September 1984) is a Belgian football referee who officiates in the Belgian First Division A and at the international level for FIFA and UEFA, and presently is ranked as a UEFA elite category referee.

== Early life ==
Lambrechts was born on 17 September 1984 in Leuven in Belgium.

== Refereeing career ==
He began refereeing at a young age and joined the Royal Belgian Football Association (RBFA) referee program in 2002.

Lambrechts made his debut in the Belgian First Division A (now the Jupiler Pro League) in the 2011–12 season. He has since officiated numerous league fixtures, including high-profile matches between major Belgian clubs. In 2014 Lambrechts was added to the FIFA list of international referees, enabling him to officiate matches in UEFA and FIFA competitions. He has refereed in UEFA Europa League, UEFA Europa Conference League, UEFA Nations League, and FIFA World Cup qualifying matches.

Lambrechts was appointed to referee matches in the UEFA Champions League - league phase, including fixtures such as Benfica vs Qarabag in September 2025.

In December 2025, he was promoted to the prestigious UEFA Elite Category of referees, one of the highest officiating distinctions in European football. Lambrechts has been recognized domestically, winning Belgian Professional Referee of the Year for the 2018–19 and 2021–22 seasons.
