= 2019–20 Ferencvárosi TC season =

Ferencvárosi TC
2019–20 season
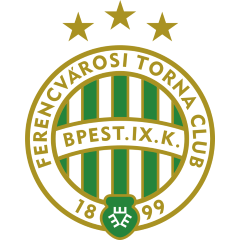
- Chairman: Gábor Kubatov
- Manager: Serhii Rebrov
- Stadium: Groupama Arena
- NB 1: 1st
- Hungarian Cup: Round of 32
- UEFA Champions League: Third qualifying round
- UEFA Europa League: Group stage
- Top goalscorer: League: Franck Boli (10); All: Tokmac Nguen; Franck Boli (12 each)
- Highest home attendance: 19,356 vs Dinamo Zagreb (13 August 2019)
- Lowest home attendance: 2,123 vs Kisvárda (13 June 2020)
| Home colours | Away colours |

The 2019–20 season was Ferencvárosi TC's 117th competitive season, 11th consecutive season in the OTP Bank Liga and 120th year in existence as a football club.

== First team squad ==
As of 16 September 2019

Note: Flags indicate national team as defined under FIFA eligibility rules; some limited exceptions apply. Players may hold more than one non-FIFA nationality.

| No. | Pos. | Nation | Player |
|---|---|---|---|
| 1 | GK | HUN | Gergő Szécsi |
| 3 | DF | HUN | Zsombor Takács |
| 5 | DF | GHA | Abraham Frimpong |
| 7 | MF | UKR | Danylo Ihnatenko |
| 8 | MF | HUN | Gergő Lovrencsics (captain) |
| 14 | MF | UKR | Ihor Kharatin |
| 16 | DF | HUN | Leandro |
| 17 | DF | BIH | Eldar Ćivić |
| 18 | MF | HUN | Dávid Sigér |
| 20 | FW | BLR | Mikalay Signevich |
| 21 | DF | HUN | Endre Botka |
| 22 | DF | HUN | Kenny Otigba |
| 23 | MF | HUN | Lukács Bőle |
| 25 | DF | SVN | Miha Blazic |

| No. | Pos. | Nation | Player |
|---|---|---|---|
| 26 | DF | GER | Marcel Heister |
| 29 | MF | BEL | Marten Wilmots |
| 30 | MF | POR | Rui Pedro |
| 33 | DF | GEO | Lasha Dvali |
| 50 | FW | HUN | Tamás Priskin |
| 51 | MF | HUN | András Csonka |
| 77 | FW | HUN | Krisztofer Szerető |
| 88 | FW | BRA | Isael |
| 90 | GK | HUN | Dénes Dibusz |
| 92 | MF | SVK | Michal Škvarka |
| 93 | FW | NOR | Tokmac Nguen |
| 97 | FW | HUN | Roland Varga |
| 99 | GK | HUN | Dávid Gróf |
| — | DF | HUN | Erik Silye |
| — | MF | HUN | Kornél Csernik |

== Transfers ==
=== Summer ===
In: Note: Flags indicate national team as defined under FIFA eligibility rules; some limited exceptions apply. Players may hold more than one non-FIFA nationality.

| No. | Pos. | Nation | Player |
|---|---|---|---|
| 1 | GK | HUN | Gergő Szécsi (from Balmazújváros) |
| 7 | MF | UKR | Danylo Ihnatenko (loan from (Ukraine) Shakhtar Donetsk) |
| 11 | MF | UKR | Oleksandr Zubkov (loan from (Ukraine) Shakhtar Donetsk) |
| 17 | DF | BIH | Eldar Ćivić (from (Czech Republic) Sparta Prague) |
| 30 | MF | POR | Rui Pedro (loan return from Szombathelyi Haladás) |
| 50 | FW | HUN | Tamás Priskin (loan return from Szombathelyi Haladás) |
| 67 | MF | HUN | István Lakatos (loan return from Soroksár) |
| 70 | FW | CIV | Franck Boli (from (Norway) Stabæk) |
| 92 | MF | SVK | Michal Škvarka (from (Slovakia) Žilina) |
| 99 | GK | HUN | Dávid Gróf (from Budapest Honvéd) |
| — | FW | HUN | Norbert Kundrák (loan return from Soroksár) |
| — | FW | SRB | Dejan Georgijević (loan return from (Serbia) Partizan) |

Out: Note: Flags indicate national team as defined under FIFA eligibility rules; some limited exceptions apply. Players may hold more than one non-FIFA nationality.

| No. | Pos. | Nation | Player |
|---|---|---|---|
| 3 | DF | HUN | Zsombor Takács (loan to Soroksár) |
| 4 | MF | MKD | Stefan Spirovski (to (Israel) Hapoel Tel Aviv) |
| 10 | FW | ITA | Davide Lanzafame (loan to Budapest Honvéd) |
| 11 | FW | SRB | Dejan Georgijević (loan to (Kazakhstan) Irtysh Pavlodar) |
| 13 | FW | HUN | Dániel Böde (to Paks) |
| 19 | MF | GER | Julian Koch (to (Germany) Hörde) |
| 27 | MF | URU | Fernando Gorriarán (to (Mexico) Santos Laguna) |
| 30 | MF | POR | Rui Pedro (loan to Diósgyőr) |
| 31 | GK | HUN | Ádám Holczer (to Paks) |
| 34 | MF | UKR | Ivan Petryak (loan return to (Ukraine) Shakhtar Donetsk) |
| 42 | GK | HUN | Ádám Varga (loan to Soroksár) |
| 67 | MF | HUN | István Lakatos (to Ajka) |
| — | FW | HUN | Norbert Kundrák (to Debrecen) |

=== Winter ===
In: Note: Flags indicate national team as defined under FIFA eligibility rules; some limited exceptions apply. Players may hold more than one non-FIFA nationality.

| No. | Pos. | Nation | Player |
|---|---|---|---|
| 7 | MF | BRA | Somália (from (Saudi Arabia) Al-Shabab) |
| 11 | FW | SRB | Dejan Georgijević (loan return from (Kazakhstan) Irtysh Pavlodar) |
| 15 | MF | ARG | Matías Rodríguez (loan to (Ecuador) Universidad Católica) |
| 19 | MF | HUN | Bálint Vécsei (from (Switzerland) Lugano) |
| 27 | MF | ARG | Gastón Lodico (from (Argentina) Lanús) |
| 53 | DF | HUN | Dominik Csontos (from Ferencváros U-19) |
| 69 | FW | HUN | Regő Szánthó (from Győr) |

Out: Note: Flags indicate national team as defined under FIFA eligibility rules; some limited exceptions apply. Players may hold more than one non-FIFA nationality.

| No. | Pos. | Nation | Player |
|---|---|---|---|
| 7 | MF | UKR | Danylo Ihnatenko (loan return to (Ukraine) Shakhtar Donetsk) |
| 15 | MF | ARG | Matías Rodríguez (to (Colombia) Cúcuta Deportivo) |
| 23 | MF | HUN | Lukács Bőle (loan to Zalaegerszeg) |
| 29 | MF | BEL | Marten Wilmots (to (Slovenia) Triglav Kranj) |
| 50 | FW | HUN | Tamás Priskin (to Győr) |

== Competitions ==
=== Overview ===
| Competition | First match | Last match | Starting round | Final position | Record | | | | | | | |
| Competition | First match | Last match | Starting round | Final position | Pld | W | D | L | GF | GA | GD | Win % |
|---|---|---|---|---|---|---|---|---|---|---|---|---|
| Nemzeti Bajnokság I | 17 August 2019 | – | Matchday 1 | – | 5 | 4 | 0 | 1 | 9 | 5 | +4 | 80.00 |
| Magyar Kupa | 25 September 2019 | 4 December 2019 | Sixth round | Round of 32 | 3 | 2 | 0 | 1 | 6 | 3 | +3 | 66.67 |
| UEFA Champions League | 10 July 2019 | 13 August 2019 | First qualifying round | Third qualifying round | 6 | 3 | 2 | 1 | 10 | 10 | +0 | 50.00 |
| UEFA Europa League | 22 August 2019 | 12 December 2019 | Play-off round | Group stage | 8 | 2 | 5 | 1 | 9 | 9 | +0 | 25.00 |
| Total | | | | | 22 | 11 | 7 | 4 | 34 | 27 | +7 | 50.00 |

Last updated: 19 December 2019
Source: Competitions

=== Nemzeti Bajnokság I ===
==== League table ====
| Pos | Team | Pld | W | D | L | GF | GA | GD | Pts | Qualification or relegation |
|---|---|---|---|---|---|---|---|---|---|---|
| 1 | Ferencváros (C) | 33 | 23 | 7 | 3 | 58 | 24 | +34 | 76 | Qualification for the Champions League first qualifying round |
| 2 | Fehérvár | 33 | 18 | 9 | 6 | 56 | 29 | +27 | 63 | Qualification for the Europa League first qualifying round |
| 3 | Puskás Akadémia | 33 | 14 | 12 | 7 | 52 | 41 | +11 | 54 | Qualification for the Europa League first qualifying round |
| 4 | Mezőkövesd | 33 | 14 | 8 | 11 | 42 | 31 | +11 | 50 | |
| 5 | Honvéd | 33 | 12 | 8 | 13 | 36 | 44 | −8 | 44 | Qualification for the Europa League first qualifying round (Note: Budapest Honvéd qualified for the Europa League first qualifying round by winning the 2019–20 Magyar Kupa.) |

Source: Hungarian Football Federation (in Hungarian), Soccerway
Rules for classification: 1) Points; 2) Matches won; 3) Goal difference; 4) Goals scored; 5) Head-to-head points; 6) Head-to-head goal difference; 7) Head-to-head away goals scored; 8) Fair play ranking; 9) Drawing of lots.
(C) Champions

==== Results summary ====
| Overall | | | | | | | | Home | | | | | | Away | | | | | |
| Pld | W | D | L | GF | GA | GD | Pts | W | D | L | GF | GA | GD | W | D | L | GF | GA | GD |
|---|---|---|---|---|---|---|---|---|---|---|---|---|---|---|---|---|---|---|---|
| 33 | 23 | 7 | 3 | 58 | 25 | +33 | 76 | 14 | 3 | 0 | 30 | 6 | +24 | 9 | 4 | 3 | 28 | 19 | +9 |

Last updated: 27 June 2020.
Source: NB1

==== Results by round ====
| Round | 1 | 2 | 3 | 4 | 5 | 6 | 7 | 8 | 9 | 10 | 11 | 12 | 13 | 14 | 15 | 16 | 17 | 18 | 19 | 20 | 21 | 22 | 23 | 24 | 25 | 26 | 27 | 28 | 29 | 30 | 31 | 32 | 33 |
|---|---|---|---|---|---|---|---|---|---|---|---|---|---|---|---|---|---|---|---|---|---|---|---|---|---|---|---|---|---|---|---|---|---|
| Ground | H | A | H | A | H | A | H | A | H | A | H | A | H | A | H | A | H | A | H | A | H | A | H | A | H | A | H | A | H | A | H | A | H |
| Result | W | W | W | L | W | W | W | D | W | W | D | W | W | W | D | W | W | W | D | W | W | L | W | D | W | D | W | D | W | W | W | L | W |
| Position | 3 | 2 | 2 | 5 | 3 | 2 | 2 | 2 | 2 | 1 | 1 | 1 | 1 | 1 | 1 | 1 | 1 | 1 | 1 | 1 | 1 | 1 | 1 | 1 | 1 | 1 | 1 | 1 | 1 | 1 | 1 | 1 | 1 |

Updated to match(es) played on 27 June 2020. Source: Matches
A = Away; H = Home; W = Win; D = Draw; L = Loss

==== Matches ====
| 23 May 2020 1 | Ferencváros | 2 – 1 | Debrecen | Budapest |
| CEST | Sigér 22', 42' | Report | Bódi 13' | Stadium: Groupama Arena; Attendance: Behind closed doors Referee: Csaba Pintér |

| 22 September 2019 2 | Zalaegerszeg | 1 – 2 | Ferencváros | Zalaegerszeg |
| 17:00 CEST | Ikoba 44' | Report | Leandro 88'; Nguen 90+2' | Stadium: ZTE Arena; Attendance: 10,665; Referee: Péter Solymosi |

| 17 August 2019 3 | Ferencváros | 1 – 0 | Kaposvár | Budapest |
| 19:30 CEST | Zubkov 7' | Report | | Stadium: Groupama Arena; Attendance: 6,891; Referee: Zoltán Iványi |

| 25 August 2019 4 | Puskás Akadémia | 4 – 1 | Ferencváros | Felcsút |
| 18:00 CEST | Sós 40'; Knežević 58' (pen.); Urblík 79', 84' | Report | Spirovski 13' | Stadium: Pancho Aréna; Attendance: 3,846; Referee: Balázs Berke |

| 1 September 2019 5 | Ferencváros | 1 – 0 | Diósgyőr | Budapest |
| 18:00 CEST | Signevich 37' | Report | | Stadium: Groupama Arena; Attendance: 8,055; Referee: Tamás Bognár |

| 14 September 2019 6 | Paks | 0 – 4 | Ferencváros | Paks |
| 19:30 CEST | | Report | Zubkov 33'; Nguen 36'; Varga 45' (pen.), 83' | Stadium: Fehérvári úti Stadion; Attendance: 2,680; Referee: Csaba Pintér |

| 29 September 2019 7 | Ferencváros | 1 – 0 | Kisvárda | Budapest |
| 16:00 CEST | Leandro 86' | Report | | Stadium: Groupama Arena; Attendance: 7,625; Referee: Zoltán Iványi |

| 6 October 2019 8 | Budapest Honvéd | 0 – 0 | Ferencváros | Budapest |
| 16:00 CEST | | Report | | Stadium: Hidegkuti Nándor Stadion; Attendance: 3,616; Referee: Sándor Andó-Szabó |

| 19 October 2019 9 | Ferencváros | 1 – 0 | Újpest | Budapest |
| 19:30 CEST | Boli 23' | Report | | Stadium: Groupama Arena; Attendance: 18,759; Referee: Tamás Bognár |

| 27 October 2019 10 | Fehérvár | 1 – 2 | Ferencváros | Székesfehérvár |
| 17:15 CET | Milanov 86' | Report | Sigér 24', 63' | Stadium: MOL Aréna Sóstó; Attendance: 12,192; Referee: Balázs Berke |

| 2 November 2019 11 | Ferencváros | 1 – 1 | Mezőkövesd | Budapest |
| 17:00 CET | Ihnatenko 9' | Report | Zivzivadze 49' | Stadium: Groupama Arena; Attendance: 7,437; Referee: Csaba Pintér |

| 10 November 2019 12 | Debrecen | 1 – 6 | Ferencváros | Debrecen |
| 17:15 CET | Kundrák 50' | Report | Varga 11', 79'; Nguen 36', 87'; Isael 61'; Bőle 76' | Stadium: Nagyerdei Stadion; Attendance: 8,136; Referee: Ádám Farkas |

| 24 November 2019 13 | Ferencváros | 3 – 2 | Zalaegerszeg | Budapest |
| 18:00 CET | Boli 6'; Nguen 15'; Isael 45' | Report | Radó 18'; G. Bobál 60' | Stadium: Groupama Arena; Attendance: 9,123; Referee: Tamás Bognár |

| 1 December 2019 14 | Kaposvár | 2 – 3 | Ferencváros | Kaposvár |
| 18:00 CET | Ádám 11'; Csiki 64' | Report | Isael 13', 32'; Boli 75' | Stadium: Rákóczi Stadion; Attendance: 4,115; Referee: Gergő Bogár |

| 8 December 2019 15 | Ferencváros | 2 – 2 | Puskás Akadémia | Budapest |
| 15:45 CET | Zubkov 7', 40' | Report | Henty 52', 77' | Stadium: Groupama Arena; Attendance: 8,127; Referee: Sándor Andó-Szabó |

| 15 December 2019 16 | Diósgyőr | 0 – 1 | Ferencváros | Miskolc |
| 18:00 CET | | Report | Zubkov 15' | Stadium: Diósgyőri Stadion; Attendance: 8,311; Referee: Ádám Farkas |

| 25 January 2020 17 | Ferencváros | 4 – 0 | Paks | Budapest |
| 14:55 CET | Zubkov 3', 65'; Boli 43'; Isael 51' | Report | | Stadium: Groupama Arena; Attendance: 8,075; Referee: Zoltán Iványi |

| 1 February 2020 18 | Kisvárda | 1 – 2 | Ferencváros | Kisvárda |
| 17:00 CET | Obradović 39' | Report | Boli 29'; Isael 85' (pen.) | Stadium: Várkerti Stadion; Attendance: 3,308; Referee: József Erdős |

| 5 February 2020 19 | Ferencváros | 0 – 0 | Budapest Honvéd | Budapest |
| 19:30 CET | | Report | | Stadium: Groupama Arena; Attendance: 7,227; Referee: Csaba Pintér |

| 27 May 2020 20 | Újpest | 0 – 1 | Ferencváros | Budapest |
| 20:00 CEST | | Report | Boli 7' | Stadium: Szusza Ferenc Stadion; Attendance: no spectators Referee: Balázs Berke |

| 15 February 2020 21 | Ferencváros | 1 – 0 | Fehérvár | Budapest |
| 19:30 CET | Zubkov 51' | Report | | Stadium: Groupama Arena; Attendance: 15,271; Referee: Balázs Berke |

| 22 February 2020 22 | Mezőkövesd | 3 – 0 | Ferencváros | Mezőkövesd |
| 19:30 CET | Karnitsky 12'; Beširović 29'; Cseri 35' | Report | | Stadium: Mezőkövesdi Városi Stadion; Attendance: 4,140; Referee: Zoltán Iványi |

| 29 February 2020 23 | Ferencváros | 2 – 0 | Debrecen | Budapest |
| 19:30 CET | Kinyik 6' (o.g.); Boli 39' | Report | | Stadium: Groupama Arena; Attendance: 8,579; Referee: Csaba Pintér |

| 7 March 2020 24 | Zalaegerszeg | 1 – 1 | Ferencváros | Zalaegerszeg |
| 19:30 CET | Radó 80' (pen.) | Report | Nguen 20' | Stadium: ZTE Arena; Attendance: 8,748; Referee: Ferenc Karakó |

| 14 March 2020 25 | Ferencváros | 5 – 0 | Kaposvár | Budapest |
| 17:00 CET | Boli 38'; Isael 58'; Blažič 73'; Varga 85', 90+2' | Report | | Stadium: Groupama Arena; Attendance: x Referee: Péter Solymosi |

| 31 May 2020 26 | Puskás Akadémia | 1 – 1 | Ferencváros | Felcsút |
| 21:05 CEST | Lovrencsics 31' (o.g.) | Report | Nguen 17' | Stadium: Pancho Aréna; Attendance: 600; Referee: Sándor Andó-Szabó |

| 7 June 2020 27 | Ferencváros | 3 – 0 | Diósgyőr | Budapest |
| 21:05 CEST | Boli 54'; Zubkov 55'; Botka 82' | Report | | Stadium: Groupama Arena; Attendance: 2,725; Referee: Ferenc Karakó |

| 10 June 2020 28 | Paks | 2 – 2 | Ferencváros | Paks |
| 21:05 CEST | Windecker 90+2' (pen.); Sajbán 90+6' | Report | Blažič 56'; Kharatin 81' | Stadium: Fehérvári úti Stadion; Attendance: 700; Referee: Tamás Bognár |

| 13 June 2020 29 | Ferencváros | 1 – 0 | Kisvárda | Budapest |
| 16:55 CEST | Sigér 75' | Report | | Stadium: Groupama Arena; Attendance: 2,123; Referee: Csaba Pintér |

| 16 June 2020 30 | Budapest Honvéd | 0 – 2 | Ferencváros | Budapest |
| 21:05 CEST | | Report | Blažič 48'; Škvarka 53' | Stadium: Hidegkuti Nándor Stadion; Attendance: 876; Referee: Sándor Andó-Szabó |

| 20 June 2020 31 | Ferencváros | 1 – 0 | Újpest | Budapest |
| 21:05 CEST | Boli 53' | Report | | Stadium: Groupama Arena; Attendance: 15,727; Referee: Gergő Bogár |

| 23 June 2020 32 | Fehérvár | 1 – 0 | Ferencváros | Székesfehérvár |
| 18:55 CEST | Juhász 45' (pen.) | Report | | Stadium: MOL Aréna Sóstó; Attendance: 6,392; Referee: Balázs Berke |

| 27 June 2020 33 | Ferencváros | 1 – 0 | Mezőkövesd | Budapest |
| 20:00 CEST | Nguen 41' | Report | | Stadium: Groupama Arena; Attendance: 11,875; Referee: József Erdős |

=== Hungarian Cup ===
| 25 September 2019 6th round | Iváncsa | 0 – 3 | Ferencváros | Iváncsa |
| 15:00 CEST | | Report | Leandro 28'; Škvarka 63'; Sigér 81' | Stadium: Iváncsai Sportpálya; Attendance: 1,000; Referee: Szabolcs Szilasi |

| 30 October 2019 7th round | BKV Előre | 1 – 3 | Ferencváros | Budapest |
| 12:30 CET | Balogh 10' | Report | Boli 5'; Miklósvári 12' (o.g.); Bőle 64' | Stadium: BKV Előre Stadion; Attendance: 1,000; Referee: Ádám Németh |

| 4 December 2019 Round of 32 | Békéscsaba | 2 – 0 | Ferencváros | Békéscsaba |
| 20:00 CET | Tóth 39'; Pantović 90+4' | Report | | Stadium: Kórház utcai Stadion; Attendance: 2,036; Referee: János Takács |

=== UEFA Champions League ===
==== First qualifying round ====
| 10 July 2019 Q1 Leg 1 | Ferencváros | 2 – 1 | (Bulgaria) Ludogorets Razgrad | Budapest |
| 20:00 CEST | Nguen 6'; Zubkov 65' | Report | Świerczok 31' | Stadium: Groupama Arena; Attendance: 18,115; Referee: (Israel) Eitan Shemeulevitch |

| 17 July 2019 Q1 Leg 2 | (Bulgaria) Ludogorets Razgrad | 2 – 3 (3 – 5 agg.) | Ferencváros | Razgrad, Bulgaria |
| 19:30 CEST | Terziev 24'; Heister 69' (o.g.) | Report | Kharatin 17'; Škvarka 21'; Nguen 48' | Stadium: Ludogorets Arena; Attendance: 7,365; Referee: (Lithuania) Donatas Rumšas |

==== Second qualifying round ====
| 24 July 2019 Q2 Leg 1 | Ferencváros | 3 – 1 | (Malta) Valletta | Budapest |
| 20:00 CEST | Bonello 19' (o.g.); Lanzafame 34' (pen.), 59' | Report | Yuri 85' | Stadium: Groupama Arena; Attendance: 18,603; Referee: (Romania) Radu Petrescu |

| 30 July 2019 Q2 Leg 2 | (Malta) Valletta | 1 – 1 (2 – 4 agg.) | Ferencváros | Ta' Qali, Malta |
| 20:00 CEST | Fontanella 27' (pen.) | Report | Nguen 60' | Stadium: Centenary Stadium; Attendance: 1,585; Referee: (Belgium) Jonathan Lardot |

==== Third qualifying round ====
| 6 August 2019 Q3 Leg 1 | (Croatia) Dinamo Zagreb | 1 – 1 | Ferencváros | Zagreb, Croatia |
| 20:00 CEST | Olmo 7' | Report | Sigér 59' | Stadium: Maksimir Stadium; Attendance: 14,283; Referee: (Poland) Paweł Raczkowski |

| 13 August 2019 Q3 Leg 2 | Ferencváros | 0 – 4 (1 – 5 agg.) | (Croatia) Dinamo Zagreb | Budapest |
| 20:00 CEST | | Report | Ademi 16'; Petković 47'; Olmo 55'; Gojak 79' | Stadium: Groupama Arena; Attendance: 19,356; Referee: (France) Ruddy Buquet |

=== UEFA Europa League ===
==== Play-off round ====
| 22 August 2019 PO Leg 1 | (Lithuania) Sūduva Marijampolé | 0 – 0 | Ferencváros | Marijampolė, Lithuania |
| 19:00 CEST | | Report | | Stadium: ARVI Football Arena; Attendance: 5,741; Referee: (Austria) Manuel Schüttengruber |

| 29 August 2019 PO Leg 2 | Ferencváros | 4 – 2 (4 – 2 agg.) | (Lithuania) Sūduva Marijampolé | Budapest |
| 20:00 CEST | Varga 36' (pen.); Boli 45+1'; Nguen 67'; Signevich 90+6' (pen.) | Report | Verbickas 11'; Topčagić 64' | Stadium: Groupama Arena; Attendance: 18,564; Referee: (Italy) Marco Guida |

==== Group stage ====
| Pos | Team | Pld | W | D | L | GF | GA | GD | Pts | Qualification | ESP | LUD | FER | CSKA |
|---|---|---|---|---|---|---|---|---|---|---|---|---|---|---|
| 1 | (Spain) Espanyol | 6 | 3 | 2 | 1 | 12 | 4 | +8 | 11 | Advance to knockout phase | — | 6–0 | 1–1 | 0–1 |
| 2 | (Bulgaria) Ludogorets Razgrad | 6 | 2 | 2 | 2 | 10 | 10 | 0 | 8 | Advance to knockout phase | 0–1 | — | 1–1 | 5–1 |
| 3 | (Hungary) Ferencváros | 6 | 1 | 4 | 1 | 5 | 7 | −2 | 7 | | 2–2 | 0–3 | — | 0–0 |
| 4 | (Russia) CSKA Moscow | 6 | 1 | 2 | 3 | 3 | 9 | −6 | 5 | | 0–2 | 1–1 | 0–1 | — |

Source: UEFA
Rules for classification: Group stage tiebreakers

| 19 September 2019 1 | RCD Espanyol (Spain) | 1 – 1 | Ferencváros | Cornellà de Llobregat, Spain |
| 21:00 CEST | Vargas 60' | Report | J. López 10' (o.g.) | Stadium: RCDE Stadium; Attendance: 18,125; Referee: (Montenegro) Nikola Dabanović |

| 3 October 2019 2 | Ferencváros | 0 – 3 | (Bulgaria) Ludogorets Razgrad | Budapest |
| 18:55 CEST | | Report | Lukoki 1'; Forster 40', 64' | Stadium: Groupama Arena; Attendance: 16,163; Referee: (Poland) Bartosz Frankowski |

| 24 October 2019 3 | CSKA Moscow (Russia) | 0 – 1 | Ferencváros | Moscow, Russia |
| 18:55 CEST | | Report | Varga 86' | Stadium: VEB Arena; Attendance: 18,518; Referee: (Czech Republic) Pavel Orel |

| 7 November 2019 4 | Ferencváros | 0 – 0 | (Russia) CSKA Moscow | Budapest |
| 21:00 CET | | Report | | Stadium: Groupama Arena; Attendance: 18,153; Referee: (North Macedonia) Aleksandar Stavrev |

| 28 November 2019 5 | Ferencváros | 2 – 2 | (Spain) RCD Espanyol | Budapest |
| 18:55 CET | Sigér 23'; Škvarka 90+1' (pen.) | Report | Melendo 31'; Darder 90+6' | Stadium: Groupama Arena; Attendance: 19,111; Referee: (Portugal) Tiago Martins |

| 12 December 2019 6 | Ludogorets Razgrad (Bulgaria) | 1 – 1 | Ferencváros | Razgrad, Bulgaria |
| 22:00 EET (UTC+2) | Lukoki 24' | Report | Signevich 90+5' | Stadium: Ludogorets Arena; Attendance: 5,528; Referee: (Slovenia) Matej Jug |

== Statistics ==
=== Appearances and goals ===
Last updated on 27 June 2020.

| No. | Pos | Nat | Player | Total | | OTP Bank Liga | | Hungarian Cup | | Champions League | |
| No. | Pos | Nat | Player | Apps | Goals | Apps | Goals | Apps | Goals | Apps | Goals |
|---|---|---|---|---|---|---|---|---|---|---|---|
| 5 | DF | (Ghana) GHA | Abraham Frimpong | 26 | 0 | 19 | 0 | 2 | 0 | 5 | 0 |
| 7 | MF | (Brazil) BRA | Somália | 6 | 0 | 6 | 0 | 0 | 0 | 0 | 0 |
| 8 | MF | (Hungary) HUN | Gergő Lovrencsics | 42 | 0 | 27 | 0 | 2 | 0 | 13 | 0 |
| 10 | FW | (Norway) NOR | Tokmac Nguen | 45 | 12 | 30 | 8 | 1 | 0 | 14 | 4 |
| 11 | MF | (Ukraine) UKR | Oleksandr Zubkov | 42 | 10 | 28 | 9 | 0 | 0 | 14 | 1 |
| 13 | MF | (Syria) SYR | Ammar Ramadan | 1 | 0 | 1 | 0 | 0 | 0 | 0 | 0 |
| 14 | MF | (Ukraine) UKR | Ihor Kharatin | 45 | 2 | 30 | 1 | 1 | 0 | 14 | 1 |
| 16 | DF | (Hungary) HUN | Leandro | 12 | 3 | 9 | 2 | 3 | 1 | 0 | 0 |
| 17 | DF | (Bosnia and Herzegovina) BIH | Eldar Ćivić | 33 | 0 | 25 | 0 | 1 | 0 | 7 | 0 |
| 18 | MF | (Hungary) HUN | Dávid Sigér | 41 | 8 | 27 | 5 | 1 | 1 | 13 | 2 |
| 19 | MF | (Hungary) HUN | Bálint Vécsei | 12 | 0 | 12 | 0 | 0 | 0 | 0 | 0 |
| 20 | FW | (Belarus) BLR | Mikalay Signevich | 31 | 3 | 21 | 1 | 1 | 0 | 9 | 2 |
| 21 | DF | (Hungary) HUN | Endre Botka | 27 | 1 | 22 | 1 | 1 | 0 | 4 | 0 |
| 22 | MF | (Hungary) HUN | Kenny Otigba | 12 | 0 | 12 | 0 | 0 | 0 | 0 | 0 |
| 25 | DF | (Slovenia) SVN | Miha Blažič | 45 | 3 | 31 | 3 | 0 | 0 | 14 | 0 |
| 26 | DF | (Germany) GER | Marcel Heister | 27 | 0 | 16 | 0 | 2 | 0 | 9 | 0 |
| 27 | MF | (Argentina) ARG | Gastón Lodico | 5 | 0 | 5 | 0 | 0 | 0 | 0 | 0 |
| 33 | DF | (Georgia (country)) GEO | Lasha Dvali | 14 | 0 | 3 | 0 | 1 | 0 | 10 | 0 |
| 51 | MF | (Hungary) HUN | András Csonka | 7 | 0 | 5 | 0 | 2 | 0 | 0 | 0 |
| 53 | MF | (Hungary) HUN | Dominik Csontos | 3 | 0 | 2 | 0 | 1 | 0 | 0 | 0 |
| 69 | FW | (Hungary) HUN | Regő Szánthó | 1 | 0 | 1 | 0 | 0 | 0 | 0 | 0 |
| 70 | FW | (Ivory Coast) CIV | Franck Boli | 37 | 12 | 28 | 10 | 1 | 1 | 8 | 1 |
| 77 | MF | (Hungary) HUN | Krisztofer Szerető | 4 | 0 | 1 | 0 | 3 | 0 | 0 | 0 |
| 88 | MF | (Brazil) BRA | Isael | 36 | 7 | 27 | 7 | 2 | 0 | 7 | 0 |
| 90 | GK | (Hungary) HUN | Dénes Dibusz | 40 | -35 | 26 | -16 | 0 | 0 | 14 | -19 |
| 92 | MF | (Slovakia) SVK | Michal Škvarka | 29 | 4 | 15 | 1 | 3 | 1 | 11 | 2 |
| 97 | FW | (Hungary) HUN | Roland Varga | 34 | 8 | 21 | 6 | 3 | 0 | 10 | 2 |
| 99 | GK | (Hungary) HUN | Dávid Gróf | 10 | -11 | 7 | -8 | 3 | -3 | 0 | 0 |
Youth players:
Out to loan:
| 23 | MF | (Hungary) HUN | Lukács Bőle | 10 | 2 | 6 | 1 | 2 | 1 | 2 | 0 |
| 30 | MF | (Portugal) POR | Rui Pedro | 0 | 0 | 0 | 0 | 0 | 0 | 0 | 0 |
Players no longer at the club:
| 4 | MF | (North Macedonia) MKD | Stefan Spirovski | 1 | 1 | 1 | 1 | 0 | 0 | 0 | 0 |
| 7 | MF | (Ukraine) UKR | Danylo Ihnatenko | 26 | 1 | 13 | 1 | 3 | 0 | 10 | 0 |
| 10 | FW | (Italy) ITA | Davide Lanzafame | 5 | 2 | 0 | 0 | 0 | 0 | 5 | 2 |
| 50 | FW | (Hungary) HUN | Tamás Priskin | 8 | 0 | 2 | 0 | 3 | 0 | 3 | 0 |

=== Top scorers ===
Includes all competitive matches. The list is sorted by shirt number when total goals are equal.

Last updated on 27 June 2020

| Position | Nation | Number | Name | OTP Bank Liga | Champions League | Hungarian Cup | Total |
|---|---|---|---|---|---|---|---|
| 1 | (Norway) | 10 | Tokmac Nguen | 8 | 4 | 0 | 12 |
| 2 | (Ivory Coast) | 70 | Franck Boli | 10 | 1 | 1 | 12 |
| 3 | (Ukraine) | 11 | Oleksandr Zubkov | 9 | 1 | 0 | 10 |
| 4 | (Hungary) | 97 | Roland Varga | 6 | 2 | 0 | 8 |
| 5 | (Hungary) | 18 | Dávid Sigér | 5 | 2 | 1 | 8 |
| 6 | (Brazil) | 88 | Isael | 7 | 0 | 0 | 7 |
| 7 | (Slovakia) | 92 | Michal Škvarka | 1 | 2 | 1 | 4 |
| 8 | (Belarus) | 20 | Mikalay Signevich | 1 | 2 | 0 | 3 |
| 9 | (Slovenia) | 25 | Miha Blažič | 3 | 0 | 0 | 3 |
| 10 | (Hungary) | 16 | Leandro | 2 | 0 | 1 | 3 |
| 11 | (Italy) | 10 | Davide Lanzafame | 0 | 2 | 0 | 2 |
| 12 | (Ukraine) | 14 | Ihor Kharatin | 1 | 1 | 0 | 2 |
| 13 | (Hungary) | 23 | Lukács Bőle | 1 | 0 | 1 | 2 |
| 14 | (North Macedonia) | 4 | Stefan Spirovski | 1 | 0 | 0 | 1 |
| 15 | (Ukraine) | 7 | Danylo Ihnatenko | 1 | 0 | 0 | 1 |
| 16 | (Hungary) | 21 | Endre Botka | 1 | 0 | 0 | 1 |
| / | / | / | Own Goals | 1 | 2 | 1 | 4 |
| | | | TOTALS | 58 | 19 | 6 | 83 |

=== Disciplinary record ===
Includes all competitive matches. Players with 1 card or more included only.

Last updated on 27 June 2020

| Position | Nation | Number | Name | OTP Bank Liga | | Champions League | | Hungarian Cup | | Total (Hu Total) | |
| Position | Nation | Number | Name | Booked | Sent off (straight red) | Booked | Sent off (straight red) | Booked | Sent off (straight red) | Booked | Sent off (straight red) |
| DF | (Ghana) | 5 | Abraham Frimpong | 2 | 0 | 3 | 0 | 0 | 0 | 5 (2) | 0 (0) |
| MF | (Ukraine) | 7 | Danylo Ihnatenko | 4 | 0 | 5 | 0 | 0 | 0 | 9 (4) | 0 (0) |
| MF | (Hungary) | 8 | Gergő Lovrencsics | 4 | 0 | 1 | 0 | 0 | 0 | 5 (4) | 0 (0) |
| FW | (Norway) | 10 | Tokmac Nguen | 1 | 0 | 0 | 0 | 0 | 0 | 1 (1) | 0 (0) |
| FW | (Italy) | 10 | Davide Lanzafame | 0 | 0 | 1 | 0 | 0 | 0 | 1 (0) | 0 (0) |
| MF | (Ukraine) | 11 | Oleksandr Zubkov | 5 | 0 | 1 | 0 | 0 | 0 | 6 (5) | 0 (0) |
| MF | (Ukraine) | 14 | Ihor Kharatin | 6 | 0 | 3 | 0 | 0 | 0 | 9 (6) | 0 (0) |
| DF | (Hungary) | 16 | Leandro | 0 | 0 | 0 | 0 | 0 | 1 | 0 (0) | 1 (0) |
| DF | (Bosnia and Herzegovina) | 17 | Eldar Ćivić | 5 | 1 | 0 | 2 | 0 | 0 | 5 (5) | 3 (1) |
| MF | (Hungary) | 18 | Dávid Sigér | 5 | 0 | 4 | 0 | 0 | 0 | 9 (5) | 0 (0) |
| MF | (Hungary) | 19 | Bálint Vécsei | 2 | 0 | 0 | 0 | 0 | 0 | 2 (2) | 0 (0) |
| FW | (Belarus) | 20 | Mikalay Signevich | 2 | 0 | 1 | 0 | 0 | 0 | 3 (1) | 0 (0) |
| DF | (Hungary) | 21 | Endre Botka | 8 | 0 | 2 | 0 | 0 | 0 | 10 (8) | 0 (0) |
| DF | (Hungary) | 22 | Kenny Otigba | 3 | 0 | 0 | 0 | 0 | 0 | 3 (3) | 0 (0) |
| MF | (Hungary) | 23 | Lukács Bőle | 2 | 0 | 0 | 0 | 0 | 0 | 2 (2) | 0 (0) |
| MF | (Slovenia) | 25 | Miha Blažič | 8 | 0 | 0 | 0 | 0 | 0 | 8 (8) | 0 (0) |
| DF | (Germany) | 26 | Marcel Heister | 3 | 0 | 3 | 0 | 0 | 0 | 6 (3) | 0 (0) |
| DF | (Georgia (country)) | 33 | Lasha Dvali | 1 | 0 | 0 | 0 | 0 | 0 | 1 (1) | 0 (0) |
| MF | (Hungary) | 51 | András Csonka | 1 | 0 | 0 | 0 | 0 | 0 | 1 (1) | 0 (0) |
| MF | (Hungary) | 53 | Dominik Csontos | 1 | 0 | 0 | 0 | 0 | 0 | 1 (1) | 0 (0) |
| FW | (Ivory Coast) | 70 | Franck Boli | 7 | 0 | 1 | 0 | 0 | 0 | 8 (7) | 0 (0) |
| MF | (Brazil) | 88 | Isael | 5 | 1 | 0 | 0 | 0 | 0 | 5 (5) | 1 (1) |
| GK | (Hungary) | 90 | Dénes Dibusz | 0 | 0 | 1 | 0 | 0 | 0 | 1 (0) | 0 (0) |
| MF | (Slovakia) | 92 | Michal Škvarka | 1 | 0 | 2 | 0 | 0 | 0 | 3 (1) | 0 (0) |
| FW | (Hungary) | 97 | Roland Varga | 1 | 0 | 0 | 0 | 0 | 0 | 1 (1) | 0 (0) |
| | | | TOTALS | 77 | 2 | 28 | 2 | 0 | 1 | 105 (77) | 5 (2) |

=== Overall ===
| Games played | 50 (33 OTP Bank Liga, 14 CL/EL and 3 Hungarian Cup) |
| Games won | 30 (23 OTP Bank Liga, 5 CL/EL and 2 Hungarian Cup) |
| Games drawn | 14 (7 OTP Bank Liga, 7 CL/EL and 0 Hungarian Cup) |
| Games lost | 6 (3 OTP Bank Liga, 2 CL/EL and 1 Hungarian Cup) |
| Goals scored | 83 |
| Goals conceded | 46 |
| Goal difference | +35 |
| Yellow cards | 105 |
| Red cards | 5 |
| Worst discipline | (Bosnia and Herzegovina) Eldar Ćivić (5 (yellow card) , 3 (red card) ) |
| Best result | 6–1 (A) v Debrecen - (Nemzeti Bajnokság I) - 10-11-2019 |
| Best result | 5–0 (H) v Kaposvár - (Nemzeti Bajnokság I) - 14-3-2020 |
| Worst result | 0–4 (H) v Dinamo Zagreb - (UEFA Champions League) - 13-08-2019 |
| Most appearances | (Ukraine) Ihor Kharatin (45 appearances) |
| Most appearances | (Norway) Tokmac Nguen (45 appearances) |
| Most appearances | (Slovenia) Miha Blažič (45 appearances) |
| Top scorer | (Ivory Coast) Franck Boli (12 goals) |
| Top scorer | (Norway) Tokmac Nguen (12 goals) |
| Points | 103/150 (68.66%) |

Last updated: 27 June 2020

=== Attendances ===
List of the home matches:

| Round | Against | Attadance | Date |
|---|---|---|---|
| CL-Q1 | Ludogorets Razgrad (Bulgaria) | 18,115 | 10 July 2019 |
| CL-Q2 | Valletta (Malta) | 18,603 | 24 July 2019 |
| CL-Q3 | Dinamo Zagreb (Croatia) | 19,356 | 13 August 2019 |
| NB I-3. | Kaposvár | 6,891 | 17 August 2019 |
| EL-PO | Sūduva Marijampolé (Lithuania) | 18,564 | 29 August 2019 |
| NB I-5. | Diósgyőr | 8,055 | 1 September 2019 |
| NB I-7. | Kisvárda | 7,625 | 29 September 2019 |
| EL-(GS) 2. | Ludogorets Razgrad (Bulgaria) | 16,163 | 3 October 2019 |
| NB I-9. | Újpest | 18,759 | 19 October 2019 |
| NB I-11. | Mezőkövesd | 7,437 | 2 November 2019 |
| EL-(GS) 4. | CSKA Moscow (Russia) | 18,153 | 7 November 2019 |
| NB I-13. | Zalaegerszeg | 9,123 | 24 November 2019 |
| EL-(GS) 5. | Espanyol (Spain) | 19,111 | 28 November 2019 |
| NB I-15. | Puskás Akadémia | 8,127 | 8 December 2019 |
| NB I-17. | Paks | 8,075 | 25 January 2020 |

As of 19 October 2019
