= 2018–19 Ferencvárosi TC season =

Ferencvárosi TC
2018–19 season
- Chairman: (Hungary) Gábor Kubatov
- Manager: (Germany) Thomas Doll (until 19 August 2018) (Ukraine) Serhii Rebrov
- NB 1: Champion
- Hungarian Cup: Quarter-final
- UEFA Europa League: 1st Qualifying Round
- Top goalscorer: League: Lanzafame (16); All: Lanzafame (17)
- Highest home attendance: 20,675 vs Újpest (29 September 2018)
- Lowest home attendance: 3,447 vs Kisvárda (20 February 2019)
Home colours	Away colours

The 2018–19 season was Ferencvárosi TC's 116th competitive season, 10th consecutive season in the OTP Bank Liga and 119th year in existence as a football club.

== Players ==
=== First team squad ===
As of 16 February 2019

Note: Flags indicate national team as defined under FIFA eligibility rules; some limited exceptions apply. Players may hold more than one non-FIFA nationality.

No.	Pos.	Nation	Player
3	DF	HUN	Zsombor Takács
4	MF	MKD	Stefan Spirovski
5	DF	GHA	Abraham Frimpong
8	FW	HUN	Gergő Lovrencsics
10	FW	ITA	Davide Lanzafame
13	FW	HUN	Dániel Böde (captain)
14	MF	UKR	Ihor Kharatin
16	DF	HUN	Leandro
17	MF	HUN	Kornél Csernik
18	MF	HUN	Dávid Sigér
19	MF	GER	Julian Koch
20	FW	BLR	Mikalay Signevich
21	DF	HUN	Endre Botka
22	DF	HUN	Kenny Otigba
23	MF	HUN	Lukács Bőle

No.	Pos.	Nation	Player
25	DF	SVN	Miha Blazic
26	DF	GER	Marcel Heister
27	MF	URU	Fernando Gorriarán
29	MF	BEL	Marten Wilmots
31	GK	HUN	Ádám Holczer
33	DF	GEO	Lasha Dvali
34	MF	UKR	Ivan Petryak
42	GK	HUN	Ádám Varga
51	MF	HUN	András Csonka
77	FW	HUN	Krisztofer Szerető
88	FW	BRA	Isael
93	FW	NOR	Tokmac Nguen
97	FW	HUN	Roland Varga
99	FW	HUN	Norbert Kundrák
—	MF	SYR	Ammar Ramadan

== Transfers ==
=== Summer ===
In: Note: Flags indicate national team as defined under FIFA eligibility rules; some limited exceptions apply. Players may hold more than one non-FIFA nationality.

No.	Pos.	Nation	Player
5	DF	GHA	Abraham Frimpong (from (Serbia) Red Star Belgrade)
7	FW	ISL	Kjartan Finnbogason (from (Denmark) Horsens)
10	FW	ITA	Davide Lanzafame (from Budapest Honvéd)
15	MF	ARG	Matías Rodríguez (from (Argentina) Chacarita Juniors)
17	MF	HUN	Kornél Csernik (loan return from Soroksár)
18	MF	HUN	Dávid Sigér (from Balmazújváros)
26	DF	GER	Marcel Heister (from (Israel) Beitar Jerusalem)
34	MF	UKR	Ivan Petryak (loan from (Ukraine) Shakhtar Donetsk)
99	FW	HUN	Norbert Kundrák (loan return from Soroksár)
—	DF	HUN	Erik Silye (loan return from Soroksár)

Out: Note: Flags indicate national team as defined under FIFA eligibility rules; some limited exceptions apply. Players may hold more than one non-FIFA nationality.

No.	Pos.	Nation	Player
5	DF	BRA	Marquinhos Pedroso (loan return to (Brazil) Figueirense)
7	DF	HUN	Bence Batik (to Honvéd)
14	MF	HUN	Dominik Nagy (loan return to (Poland) Legia Warsaw)
15	MF	HUN	Tamás Hajnal (Retired)
20	MF	HUN	Zoltán Gera (Retired)
27	FW	HUN	Tamás Priskin (loan to Haladás)
28	MF	GHA	Joseph Paintsil (loan return to (Ghana) Tema Youth)
37	DF	GER	Janek Sternberg (to (Germany) Kaiserslautern)
—	DF	HUN	Erik Silye (loan to Mezőkövesd)

=== Winter ===
In: Note: Flags indicate national team as defined under FIFA eligibility rules; some limited exceptions apply. Players may hold more than one non-FIFA nationality.

No.	Pos.	Nation	Player
14	MF	UKR	Ihor Kharatin (from (Ukraine) Zorya Luhansk)
20	FW	BLR	Mikalay Signevich (from (Belarus) BATE)
29	MF	BEL	Marten Wilmots (free agent)
33	DF	GEO	Lasha Dvali (from (Poland) Pogoń Szczecin)
77	FW	HUN	Krisztofer Szerető (from (England) Stoke City)
88	FW	BRA	Isael (free agent)
93	FW	NOR	Tokmac Nguen (from (Norway) Strømsgodset)
—	MF	SYR	Ammar Ramadan (free agent)

Out: Note: Flags indicate national team as defined under FIFA eligibility rules; some limited exceptions apply. Players may hold more than one non-FIFA nationality.

No.	Pos.	Nation	Player
7	FW	ISL	Kjartan Finnbogason (to (Denmark) Vejle)
11	FW	SRB	Dejan Georgijević (loan to (Serbia) Partizan)
15	MF	ARG	Matías Rodríguez (loan to (Ecuador) Universidad Católica)
17	MF	HUN	Kornél Csernik (loan to Soroksár)
30	MF	POR	Rui Pedro (loan to Haladás)
40	MF	NIG	Amadou Moutari (to Mezőkövesd)
91	FW	HUN	Balázs Lovrencsics (to Győr)

== Statistics ==
=== Appearances and goals ===
Last updated on 19 May 2019.

No.	Pos	Nat	Player	Total		OTP Bank Liga		Europa League		Hungarian Cup	
No.	Pos	Nat	Player	Apps	Goals	Apps	Goals	Apps	Goals	Apps	Goals
3	DF	(Hungary) HUN	Zsombor Takács	3	0	1	0	0	0	2	0
4	MF	(North Macedonia) MKD	Stefan Spirovski	18	3	14	2	2	1	2	0
5	DF	(Ghana) GHA	Abraham Frimpong	16	1	13	1	2	0	1	0
8	MF	(Hungary) HUN	Gergő Lovrencsics	36	2	31	2	2	0	3	0
10	FW	(Italy) ITA	Davide Lanzafame	34	17	28	16	2	0	4	1
13	FW	(Hungary) HUN	Dániel Böde	30	9	23	7	2	0	5	2
14	MF	(Ukraine) UKR	Ihor Kharatin	17	2	14	2	0	0	3	0
16	DF	(Hungary) HUN	Leandro	35	2	29	1	1	0	5	1
18	MF	(Hungary) HUN	Dávid Sigér	27	2	23	2	0	0	4	0
19	DF	(Germany) GER	Julian Koch	2	0	1	0	0	0	1	0
20	FW	(Belarus) BLR	Mikalay Signevich	13	4	11	4	0	0	2	0
21	DF	(Hungary) HUN	Endre Botka	15	0	11	0	1	0	3	0
22	DF	(Hungary) HUN	Kenneth Otigba	5	0	3	0	0	0	2	0
23	MF	(Hungary) HUN	Lukács Bőle	29	3	25	3	2	0	2	0
25	DF	(Slovenia) SVN	Miha Blažič	36	2	29	2	2	0	5	0
26	DF	(Germany) GER	Marcel Heister	38	1	31	1	1	0	6	0
27	MF	(Uruguay) URU	Fernando Gorriarán	31	4	24	2	2	0	5	2
31	GK	(Hungary) HUN	Ádám Holczer	5	-3	1	-1	0	0	4	-2
33	DF	(Georgia (country)) GEO	Lasha Dvali	16	2	12	2	0	0	4	0
34	MF	(Ukraine) UKR	Ivan Petryak	36	6	28	6	2	0	6	0
42	GK	(Hungary) HUN	Ádám Varga	1	0	1	0	0	0	0	0
51	MF	(Hungary) HUN	András Csonka	10	0	5	0	0	0	5	0
77	MF	(Hungary) HUN	Krisztofer Szerető	2	0	1	0	0	0	1	0
88	MF	(Brazil) BRA	Isael	12	1	9	1	0	0	3	0
90	GK	(Hungary) HUN	Dénes Dibusz	38	-31	32	-26	2	-2	4	-3
93	FW	(Norway) NOR	Tokmac Nguen	14	4	12	4	0	0	2	0
97	FW	(Hungary) HUN	Roland Varga	33	12	28	12	2	0	3	0
Out to loan:
11	FW	(Serbia) SRB	Dejan Georgijević	1	1	0	0	0	0	1	1
15	MF	(Argentina) ARG	Matías Rodríguez	6	0	3	0	1	0	2	0
17	MF	(Hungary) HUN	Kornél Csernik	9	0	6	0	0	0	3	0
30	MF	(Portugal) POR	Rui Pedro	2	0	1	0	0	0	1	0
Players no longer at the club:
7	FW	(Iceland) ISL	Kjartan Finnbogason	14	6	9	0	2	0	3	6
91	FW	(Hungary) HUN	Balázs Lovrencsics	1	1	0	0	0	0	1	1

=== Top scorers ===
Includes all competitive matches. The list is sorted by shirt number when total goals are equal.

Last updated on 19 May 2019

Position	Nation	Number	Name	OTP Bank Liga	Europa League	Hungarian Cup	Total
1	(Italy)	10	Davide Lanzafame	16	0	1	17
2	(Hungary)	97	Roland Varga	12	0	0	12
3	(Hungary)	13	Dániel Böde	7	0	2	9
4	(Ukraine)	34	Ivan Petryak	6	0	0	6
5	(Iceland)	7	Kjartan Finnbogason	0	0	6	6
6	(Belarus)	20	Mikalay Signevich	4	0	0	4
7	(Norway)	93	Tokmac Nguen	4	0	0	4
8	(Uruguay)	27	Fernando Gorriarán	2	0	2	4
9	(North Macedonia)	4	Stefan Spirovski	2	1	0	3
10	(Hungary)	23	Lukács Bőle	3	0	0	3
11	(Slovenia)	25	Miha Blažič	2	0	0	2
12	(Hungary)	8	Gergő Lovrencsics	2	0	0	2
13	(Hungary)	18	Dávid Sigér	2	0	0	2
14	(Georgia (country))	33	Lasha Dvali	2	0	0	2
15	(Ukraine)	14	Ihor Kharatin	2	0	0	2
16	(Hungary)	16	Leandro	1	0	1	2
17	(Germany)	26	Marcel Heister	1	0	0	1
18	(Ghana)	5	Abraham Frimpong	1	0	0	1
19	(Brazil)	88	Isael	1	0	0	1
20	(Serbia)	11	Dejan Georgijević	0	0	1	1
21	(Hungary)	91	Balázs Lovrencsics	0	0	1	1
/	/	/	Own Goals	2	0	0	2
			TOTALS	72	1	14	87

=== Disciplinary record ===
Includes all competitive matches. Players with 1 card or more included only.

Last updated on 19 May 2019

Position	Nation	Number	Name	OTP Bank Liga		Europa League		Hungarian Cup		Total (Hu Total)	
Position	Nation	Number	Name	Booked	Sent off (straight red)	Booked	Sent off (straight red)	Booked	Sent off (straight red)	Booked	Sent off (straight red)
MF	(North Macedonia)	4	Stefan Spirovski	4	0	0	0	0	0	4 (4)	0 (0)
DF	(Ghana)	5	Abraham Frimpong	2	0	0	0	1	0	3 (2)	0 (0)
MF	(Hungary)	8	Gergő Lovrencsics	5	0	0	0	0	0	5 (5)	0 (0)
FW	(Iceland)	7	Kjartan Finnbogason	0	0	1	0	0	0	1 (0)	0 (0)
FW	(Italy)	10	Davide Lanzafame	10	0	0	0	1	0	11 (10)	0 (0)
FW	(Hungary)	13	Dániel Böde	2	0	1	0	1	0	4 (2)	0 (0)
MF	(Ukraine)	14	Ihor Kharatin	2	0	0	0	0	0	2 (2)	0 (0)
DF	(Hungary)	16	Leandro	7	0	0	0	1	0	8 (7)	0 (0)
MF	(Hungary)	18	Dávid Sigér	2	0	0	0	0	0	2 (2)	0 (0)
FW	(Belarus)	20	Mikalay Signevich	3	0	0	0	1	0	4 (3)	0 (0)
DF	(Hungary)	22	Kenneth Otigba	1	0	0	0	0	0	1 (1)	0 (0)
MF	(Hungary)	23	Lukács Bőle	2	0	0	0	0	1	2 (2)	1 (0)
DF	(Slovenia)	25	Miha Blažič	3	0	0	0	0	0	3 (3)	0 (0)
DF	(Germany)	26	Marcel Heister	8	1	0	0	2	0	10 (8)	1 (1)
MF	(Uruguay)	27	Fernando Gorriarán	5	0	0	0	2	0	7 (5)	0 (0)
DF	(Georgia (country))	33	Lasha Dvali	1	0	0	0	0	0	1 (1)	0 (0)
MF	(Ukraine)	34	Ivan Petryak	5	0	0	0	0	0	5 (5)	0 (0)
MF	(Hungary)	51	András Csonka	0	0	0	0	1	0	1 (0)	0 (0)
MF	(Brazil)	88	Isael	4	0	0	0	1	0	5 (4)	0 (0)
GK	(Hungary)	90	Dénes Dibusz	2	0	0	0	0	1	2 (2)	1 (0)
FW	(Norway)	93	Tokmac Nguen	1	0	0	0	1	0	2 (1)	0 (0)
			TOTALS	69	1	2	0	12	2	83 (69)	3 (1)

=== Overall ===
Games played	42 (33 OTP Bank Liga, 2 Europa League and 7 Hungarian Cup)
Games won	27 (23 OTP Bank Liga, 0 Europa League and 4 Hungarian Cup)
Games drawn	7 (5 OTP Bank Liga, 1 Europa League and 1 Hungarian Cup)
Games lost	8 (5 OTP Bank Liga, 1 Europa League and 2 Hungarian Cup)
Goals scored	87
Goals conceded	34
Goal difference	+53
Yellow cards	83
Red cards	3
Worst discipline	(Germany) Marcel Heister (10 (yellow card) , 1 (red card) )
Best result	7–0 (H) v Diósgyőr - (Nemzeti Bajnokság I) - 02–03–2019
Worst result	0–2 (A) v MOL Vidi - (Magyar Kupa) - 03–04–2019
Most appearances	(Hungary) Dénes Dibusz (38 appearances)
Most appearances	(Germany) Marcel Heister (38 appearances)
Top scorer	(Italy) Davide Lanzafame (16 goals)
Points	88/126 (69.84%)

Last updated: 19 May 2019

== Nemzeti Bajnokság I ==
=== Matches ===
22 July 2018 1	Ferencváros	4 – 1	Diósgyőr	Budapest, Pest County
17:30 CEST	Tamás 15' (o.g.); Heister 25'; Varga 46', 69'	Report	Bacsa 45'	Stadium: Groupama Arena; Attendance: 6,920; Referee: (Hungary) Sándor Andó-Szabó

29 July 2018 2	MTK Budapest	1 – 4	Ferencváros	Budapest, Pest County
18:00 CEST	Kanta 60' (pen.)	Report	Bőle 15'; Petryak 34', 38'; Varga 88'	Stadium: Hidegkuti Nándor Stadion; Attendance: 4,079; Referee: (Hungary) Viktor Kassai

4 August 2018 3	Ferencváros	3 – 1	Haladás	Budapest, Pest County
20:15 CEST	Varga 23'; Lanzafame 53', 63' (pen.)	Report	Gaál 49'	Stadium: Groupama Arena; Attendance: 7,504; Referee: (Hungary) Gergely Szőts

11 August 2018 4	Kisvárda	0 – 2	Ferencváros	Kisvárda, Szabolcs-Szatmár-Bereg County
19:30 CEST		Report	Leandro 55'; Lanzafame 75' (pen.)	Stadium: Várkert Stadium; Attendance: 2,850; Referee: (Hungary) Csaba Pintér

18 August 2018 5	Ferencváros	1 – 1	Paks	Budapest, Pest County
17:00 CEST	Petryak 3'	Report	Hahn 47'	Stadium: Groupama Arena; Attendance: 7,147; Referee: (Hungary) József Erdős

25 August 2018 6	Mezőkövesd	0 – 1	Ferencváros	Mezőkövesd, Borsod-Abaúj-Zemplén County
19:30 CEST		Report	Böde 90+1'	Stadium: Mezőkövesdi Városi Stadion; Attendance: 4,015; Referee: (Hungary) Zoltán Iványi

2 September 2018 7	Ferencváros	2 – 2	MOL Vidi	Budapest, Pest County
18:00 CEST	Spirovski 14'; Lovrencsics 35'	Report	Nikolov 44'; Huszti 75'	Stadium: Groupama Arena; Attendance: 14,520; Referee: (Hungary) Balázs Berke

15 September 2018 8	Budapest Honvéd	0 – 1	Ferencváros	Budapest, Pest County
19:30 CEST		Report	Petryak 16'	Stadium: Hidegkuti Nándor Stadion; Attendance: 3,579; Referee: (Hungary) József Erdős

29 September 2018 9	Ferencváros	1 – 0	Újpest	Budapest, Pest County
19:30 CEST	Lanzafame 58'	Report		Stadium: Groupama Arena; Attendance: 20,675; Referee: (Hungary) Sándor Andó-Szabó

6 October 2018 10	Ferencváros	2 – 2	Debrecen	Budapest, Pest County
19:30 CEST	Lanzafame 48', 82'	Report	Takács 20'; Szécsi 74'	Stadium: Groupama Arena; Attendance: 8,911; Referee: (Hungary) Zoltán Iványi

20 October 2018 11	Puskás Akadémia	1 – 0	Ferencváros	Felcsút, Fejér County
19:30 CEST	Hegedűs 20'	Report		Stadium: Pancho Arena; Attendance: 3,838; Referee: (Hungary) Péter Solymosi

27 October 2018 12	Diósgyőr	1 – 4	Ferencváros	Miskolc, Borsod-Abaúj-Zemplén County
17:00 CEST	Mihajlović 71' (pen.)	Report	Böde 26', 37', 47'; Spirovski 39'	Stadium: Diósgyőri Stadion; Attendance: 7,768; Referee: (Hungary) Balázs Berke

3 November 2018 13	Ferencváros	2 – 0	MTK Budapest	Budapest, Pest County
19:30 CET	Bőle 24'; Sigér 39'	Report		Stadium: Groupama Arena; Attendance: 11,067; Referee: (Hungary) Sándor Andó-Szabó

10 November 2018 14	Haladás	1 – 0	Ferencváros	Szombathely, Vas County
19:30 CET	Gaál 53' (pen.)	Report		Stadium: Haladás Sportkomplexum; Attendance: 8,294; Referee: (Hungary) Ádám Farkas

24 November 2018 15	Ferencváros	2 – 0	Kisvárda	Budapest, Pest County
17:00 CET	Frimpong 21'; Blažič 33'	Report		Stadium: Groupama Arena; Attendance: 7,543; Referee: (Hungary) István Vad

1 December 2018 16	Paks	0 – 3	Ferencváros	Paks, Tolna County
19:30 CET		Report	Böde 16'; Blažič 26'; Varga 67'	Stadium: Fehérvári úti Stadion; Attendance: 1,916; Referee: (Hungary) József Erdős

8 December 2018 17	Ferencváros	3 – 2	Mezőkövesd	Budapest, Pest County
17:00 CET	Lanzafame 1', 79'; Varga 88' (pen.)	Report	Cseri 83' (pen.); Vadnai 90+1'	Stadium: Groupama Arena; Attendance: 7,054; Referee: (Hungary) Sándor Andó-Szabó

16 December 2018 18	MOL Vidi	2 – 1	Ferencváros	Székesfehérvár, Fejér County
20:15 CET	Hodžić 30'; Šćepović 67'	Report	Petryak 37'	Stadium: MOL Aréna Sóstó; Attendance: 6,442; Referee: (Hungary) József Erdős

2 February 2019 19	Ferencváros	1 – 0	Budapest Honvéd	Budapest, Pest County
19:30 CET	Böde 83'	Report		Stadium: Groupama Arena; Attendance: 10,027; Referee: (Hungary) Balázs Berke

9 February 2019 20	Újpest	1 – 1	Ferencváros	Budapest, Pest County
19:30 CET	Simon 90+3'	Report	Varga 11'	Stadium: Szusza Ferenc Stadion; Attendance: 8,719; Referee: (Hungary) Ádám Farkas

16 February 2019 21	Debrecen	2 – 1	Ferencváros	Debrecen, Hajdú-Bihar County
14:00 CET	Tőzsér 83' (pen.); Zsóri 90+3'	Report	Dvali 30'	Stadium: Nagyerdei Stadion; Attendance: 7,002; Referee: (Hungary) Balázs Berke

23 February 2019 22	Ferencváros	4 – 0	Puskás Akadémia	Budapest, Pest County
17:00 CET	Gorriarán 47' (pen.); Petryak 49'; Nguen 58'; Signevich 90+2'	Report		Stadium: Groupama Arena; Attendance: 6,771; Referee: (Hungary) Ádám Farkas

2 March 2019 23	Ferencváros	7 – 0	Diósgyőr	Budapest, Pest County
19:30 CET	Gorriarán 27'; Varga 33' (pen.), 56'; Signevich 42', 59'; Lanzafame 84' (pen.), 86'	Report		Stadium: Groupama Arena; Attendance: 9,437; Referee: (Hungary) Tamás Bognár

9 March 2019 24	MTK Budapest	1 – 3	Ferencváros	Budapest, Pest County
19:30 CET	Gera 77'	Report	Varga 5'; Lanzafame 29', 42'	Stadium: Hidegkuti Nándor Stadion; Attendance: 4,587; Referee: (Hungary) Csaba Pintér

16 March 2019 25	Ferencváros	2 – 0	Haladás	Budapest, Pest County
17:00 CET	Lovrencsics 70'; Sigér 78'	Report		Stadium: Groupama Arena; Attendance: 7,865; Referee: (Hungary) Ferenc Karakó

30 March 2019 26	Kisvárda	0 – 1	Ferencváros	Kisvárda, Szabolcs-Szatmár-Bereg County
17:00 CEST		Report	Signevich 48'	Stadium: Várkert Stadium; Attendance: 3,331; Referee: (Hungary) Zoltán Iványi

6 April 2019 27	Ferencváros	3 – 0	Paks	Budapest, Pest County
17:00 CEST	Lenzsér 1' (o.g.); Nguen 50'; Böde 80'	Report		Stadium: Groupama Arena; Attendance: 9,673; Referee: (Hungary) Gergő Bogár

13 April 2019 28	Mezőkövesd	1 – 2	Ferencváros	Mezőkövesd, Borsod-Abaúj-Zemplén County
17:00 CEST	Dražić 18'	Report	Dvali 48'; Bőle 80'	Stadium: Mezőkövesdi Városi Stadion; Attendance: 4,032; Referee: (Hungary) Ádám Farkas

20 April 2019 29	Ferencváros	4 – 1	MOL Vidi	Budapest, Pest County
19:30 CEST	Nguen 7'; Kharatin 58'; Lanzafame 68', 90+2'	Report	Négo 22'	Stadium: Groupama Arena; Attendance: 16,127; Referee: (Hungary) Balázs Berke

27 April 2019 30	Budapest Honvéd	3 – 2	Ferencváros	Budapest, Pest County
19:30 CEST	Uzoma 36'; Ben-Hatira 62', 76'	Report	Kharatin 54'; Nguen 73'	Stadium: Hidegkuti Nándor Stadion; Attendance: 3,090; Referee: (Hungary) Zoltán Iványi

4 May 2019 31	Ferencváros	2 – 1	Újpest	Budapest, Pest County
19:30 CEST	Varga 22'; Lanzafame 50'	Report	Nagy 39'	Stadium: Groupama Arena; Attendance: 20,057; Referee: (Hungary) Sándor Andó-Szabó

11 May 2019 32	Ferencváros	2 – 1	Debrecen	Budapest, Pest County
19:30 CEST	Isael 14'; Varga 57'	Report	Pávkovics 43'	Stadium: Groupama Arena; Attendance: 10,857; Referee: (Hungary) Csaba Pintér

19 May 2019 33	Puskás Akadémia	1 – 1	Ferencváros	Felcsút, Fejér County
17:00 CEST	Nagy 52'	Report	Lanzafame 60'	Stadium: Pancho Arena; Attendance: 3,865; Referee: (Hungary) Csaba Pintér

=== League table ===
Pos	Team	Pld	W	D	L	GF	GA	GD	Pts	Qualification or relegation
1	Ferencváros (C)	33	23	5	5	72	27	+45	74	Qualification for the Champions League first qualifying round
2	Vidi	33	18	7	8	53	37	+16	61	Qualification for the Europa League first qualifying round (Note: Since the winners of the 2018–19 Magyar Kupa, Vidi, qualified for European competition based on league position, the spot awarded to the cup winners (Europa League first qualifying round) was passed to the fourth-placed team.)
3	Debrecen	33	14	9	10	44	39	+5	51	Qualification for the Europa League first qualifying round
4	Honvéd	33	13	10	10	46	38	+8	49	Qualification for the Europa League first qualifying round
5	Újpest	33	12	12	9	38	28	+10	48	

Source: Hungarian Football Federation (in Hungarian), Soccerway
Rules for classification: 1) Points; 2) Matches won; 3) Goal difference; 4) Goals scored; 5) Head-to-head points; 6) Head-to-head goal difference; 7) Head-to-head away goals scored; 8) Fair play ranking; 9) Drawing of lots.
(C) Champions

=== Results summary ===
Overall								Home						Away					
Pld	W	D	L	GF	GA	GD	Pts	W	D	L	GF	GA	GD	W	D	L	GF	GA	GD
33	23	5	5	72	27	+45	74	14	3	0	45	12	+33	9	2	5	27	15	+12

Last updated: 19 May 2019.
Source: NB1

=== Results by round ===
Round	1	2	3	4	5	6	7	8	9	10	11	12	13	14	15	16	17	18	19	20	21	22	23	24	25	26	27	28	29	30	31	32	33
Ground	H	A	H	A	H	A	H	A	H	H	A	A	H	A	H	A	H	A	H	A	A	H	H	A	H	A	H	A	H	A	H	H	A
Result	W	W	W	W	D	W	D	W	W	D	L	W	W	L	W	W	W	L	W	D	L	W	W	W	W	W	W	W	W	L	W	W	D
Position	2	1	1	1	1	1	1	1	1	1	1	1	1	1	1	1	1	1	1	1	1	1	1	1	1	1	1	1	1	1	1	1	1

Updated to match(es) played on 19 May 2019. Source: Matches
A = Away; H = Home; W = Win; D = Draw; L = Loss

== Hungarian Cup ==
22 September 2018 Round 6	Szeged	0 – 2	Ferencváros	Szeged, Csongrád County
15:00 CEST		Report	Leandro 25'; Finnbogason 88'	Stadium: Vasutas Sportpálya; Attendance: 3,000; Referee: (Hungary) Péter Antal

31 October 2018 Round 7	Sárvár	0 – 4	Ferencváros	Sárvár, Vas County
12:30 CET		Report	Finnbogason 12', 83', 89'; Böde 51'	Stadium: Sárvári Sporttelep; Attendance: 2,563; Referee: (Hungary) Szabolcs Szilasi

5 December 2018 Round of 32	Sényő	0 – 4	Ferencváros	Sényő, Szabolcs-Szatmár-Bereg County
12:00 CET		Report	Finnbogason 50' (pen.), 62'; Georgijević 76'; B. Lovrencsics 90+2'	Stadium: Sényői Sporttelep; Attendance: 2,000; Referee: (Hungary) Ádám Németh

20 February 2019 Round of 16 (leg 1)	Ferencváros	2 – 0	Kisvárda	Budapest, Pest County
18:00 CET	Lanzafame 54'; Böde 86'	Report		Stadium: Groupama Arena; Attendance: 3,447; Referee: (Hungary) Csaba Pintér

26 February 2019 Round of 16 (leg 2)	Kisvárda	1 – 1 (1 – 3 agg.)	Ferencváros	Kisvárda, Szabolcs-Szatmár-Bereg County
20:00 CET	Grozav 67' (pen.)	Report	Gorriarán 33'	Stadium: Várkert Sportpálya; Attendance: 1,752; Referee: (Hungary) Róbert Nagy

13 March 2019 Quarter-final (leg 1)	Ferencváros	1 – 2	MOL Vidi	Budapest, Pest County
18:00 CET	Gorriarán 27'	Report	Juhász 6'; Vinícius 58'	Stadium: Groupama Arena; Attendance: 7,567; Referee: (Hungary) Péter Solymosi

3 April 2019 Quarter-final (leg 2)	MOL Vidi	2 – 0 (4 – 1 agg.)	Ferencváros	Székesfehérvár, Fejér County
18:00 CEST	Nikolov 58'; Milanov 82'	Report		Stadium: MOL Aréna Sóstó; Attendance: 6,202; Referee: (Hungary) Viktor Kassai

== Europa League ==
12 July 2018 Q1 Leg 1	(Hungary) Ferencváros	1 – 1	(Israel) Maccabi Tel Aviv	Budapest
19:00 CEST	Spirovski 61'	Report	Atar 90+1'	Stadium: Groupama Arena; Attendance: 14,127; Referee: (Spain) Ricardo de Burgos Bengoetxea

19 July 2018 Q1 Leg 2	(Israel) Maccabi Tel Aviv	1 – 0 (2 – 1 agg.)	(Hungary) Ferencváros	Netanya
19:00 CEST	Atar 45+1'	Report		Stadium: Netanya Stadium; Attendance: 8,256; Referee: (Portugal) Hugo Miguel
