= Dávid Sigér =

Hungarian footballer (born 1990)

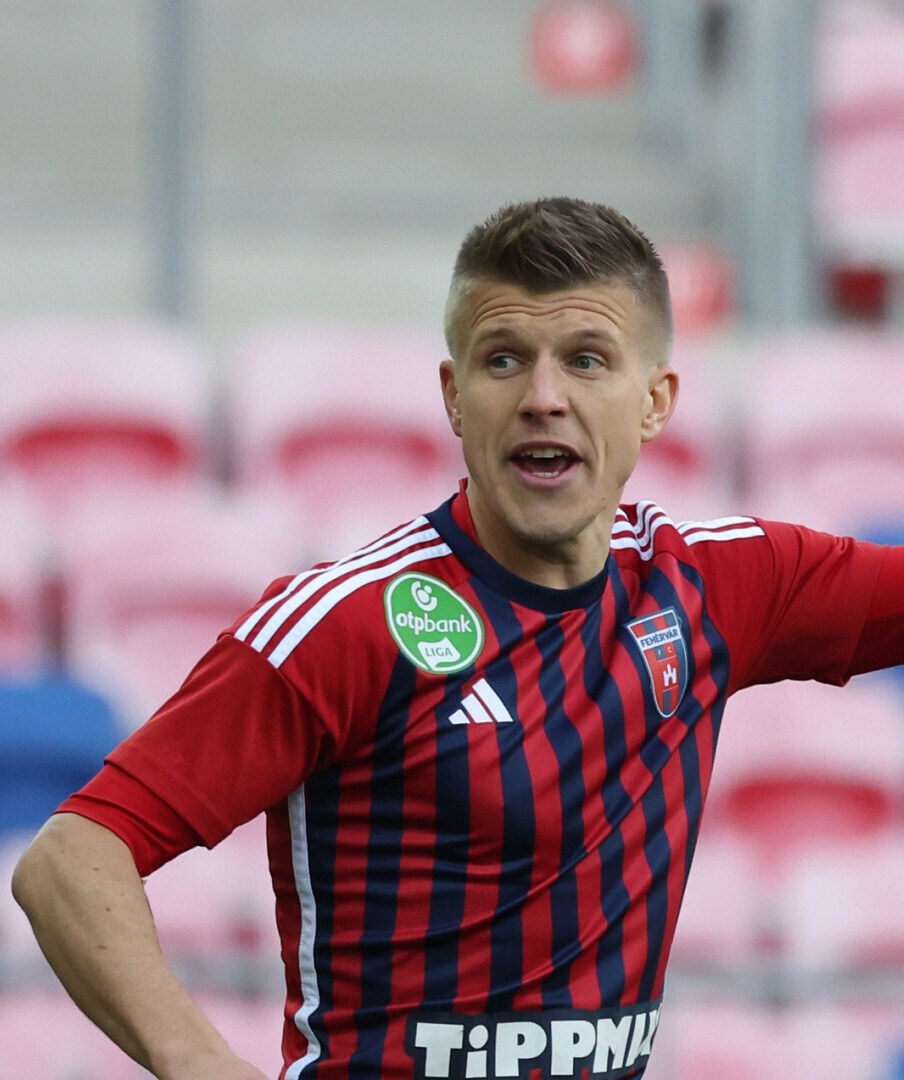
- Sigér playing for Fehérvár in 2024

Personal information
- Full name: Dávid Miklós Sigér
- Date of birth: 30 November 1990 (age 35)
- Place of birth: Debrecen, Hungary
- Height: 1.75 m (5 ft 9 in)
- Position: Midfielder

Team information
- Current team: Sepsi OSK
- Number: 18

Youth career
- 2002–2008: Debrecen
- 2006–2008: → Téglás (loan)

Senior career*
| Years | Team | Apps | (Gls) |
| 2008–2015 | Debrecen | 0 | (0) |
| 2010–2012 | → Debrecen II | 37 | (2) |
| 2008–2010 | → Létavértes (loan) | 50 | (9) |
| 2012 | → Létavértes (loan) | 15 | (3) |
| 2012–2014 | → Mezőkövesd (loan) | 16 | (1) |
| 2014–2015 | → Balmazújváros (loan) | 25 | (0) |
| 2015–2018 | Balmazújváros | 98 | (12) |
| 2018–2024 | Ferencváros | 99 | (9) |
| 2024 | Fehérvár | 14 | (0) |
| 2024– | Sepsi OSK | 38 | (1) |

International career
| 2019–2021 | Hungary | 14 | (1) |
- * Club domestic league appearances and goals as of 12 December 2025

Dávid Miklós Sigér (born 30 November 1990) is a Hungarian professional footballer who plays as a midfielder for Liga I club Sepsi OSK.

== Club career ==
=== Ferencváros ===
On 16 June 2020, he became champion with Ferencváros by beating Budapest Honvéd FC at the Hidegkuti Nándor Stadion on the 30th match day of the 2019–20 Nemzeti Bajnokság I season.

On 29 September 2020, he was member of the Ferencváros team which qualified for the 2020–21 UEFA Champions League group stage after beating Molde FK on 3-3 aggregate (away goals) at the Groupama Aréna.

On 5 May 2023, he won the 2022–23 Nemzeti Bajnokság I with Ferencváros, after Kecskemét lost 1–0 to Honvéd at the Bozsik Aréna on the 30th matchday.

During his convelascance he was helped by the club's sport psychologists.

In an interview with Nemzeti Sport, he said that after losing to Klaksvíkar Ítróttarfelag the whole team changed and every one started to perform better.

On 5 February 2024, Sigér signed with Fehérvár.

== International career ==
Sigér made his debut for the Hungary national team on 5 September 2019 in a friendly against Montenegro, as a half-time substitute for László Kleinheisler.

On 1 June 2021, Sigér was included in the final 26-man squad to represent Hungary at the rescheduled UEFA Euro 2020 tournament.

== Career statistics ==
=== Club ===
As of matches played 12 December 2025

Appearances and goals by club, season and competition
| Club | Season | League | | | National cup (Note: Includes Magyar Kupa, Cupa României) | | Europe | | Other | | Total | |
| Club | Season | Division | Apps | Goals | Apps | Goals | Apps | Goals | Apps | Goals | Apps | Goals |
|---|---|---|---|---|---|---|---|---|---|---|---|---|
| Létavértes (loan) | 2008–09 | Nemzeti Bajnokság III | 27 | 4 | 0 | 0 | — | | — | | 27 | 4 |
| Létavértes (loan) | 2009–10 | Nemzeti Bajnokság III | 23 | 5 | 0 | 0 | — | | — | | 23 | 5 |
| Létavértes (loan) | 2011–12 | Nemzeti Bajnokság III | 15 | 3 | 0 | 0 | — | | — | | 15 | 3 |
| Létavértes (loan) | Total | | 65 | 12 | 0 | 0 | — | | — | | 65 | 12 |
| Debrecen II | 2010–11 | Nemzeti Bajnokság II | 24 | 1 | 2 | 0 | — | | — | | 26 | 1 |
| Debrecen II | 2011–12 | Nemzeti Bajnokság III | 13 | 1 | 2 | 0 | — | | — | | 15 | 1 |
| Debrecen II | Total | | 37 | 2 | 4 | 0 | — | | — | | 41 | 2 |
| Debrecen | 2011–12 | Nemzeti Bajnokság I | 0 | 0 | 0 | 0 | — | | 2 | 0 | 2 | 0 |
| Mezőkövesd (loan) | 2012–13 | Nemzeti Bajnokság II | 12 | 1 | 2 | 0 | — | | — | | 14 | 1 |
| Mezőkövesd (loan) | 2013–14 | Nemzeti Bajnokság I | 4 | 0 | 3 | 1 | — | | 2 | 0 | 9 | 1 |
| Mezőkövesd (loan) | Total | | 16 | 1 | 5 | 1 | — | | 2 | 0 | 23 | 2 |
| Balmazújváros (loan) | 2014–15 | Nemzeti Bajnokság II | 25 | 0 | 0 | 0 | — | | 5 | 0 | 30 | 0 |
| Balmazújváros | 2015–16 | Nemzeti Bajnokság II | 29 | 4 | 1 | 1 | — | | — | | 30 | 5 |
| Balmazújváros | 2016–17 | Nemzeti Bajnokság II | 37 | 4 | 1 | 0 | — | | — | | 39 | 4 |
| Balmazújváros | 2017–18 | Nemzeti Bajnokság II | 32 | 4 | 6 | 0 | — | | — | | 38 | 4 |
| Balmazújváros | Total | | 123 | 12 | 8 | 1 | — | | 5 | 0 | 136 | 13 |
| Ferencváros | 2018–19 | Nemzeti Bajnokság I | 23 | 2 | 4 | 0 | 0 | 0 | — | | 27 | 2 |
| Ferencváros | 2019–20 | Nemzeti Bajnokság I | 27 | 5 | 1 | 1 | 13 (Note: Six appearances and one goal in UEFA Champions League, seven appearances and one goal in UEFA Europa League) | 2 | — | | 41 | 8 |
| Ferencváros | 2020–21 | Nemzeti Bajnokság I | 24 | 1 | 2 | 0 | 9 (Note: Appearances in UEFA Champions League) | 1 | — | | 35 | 2 |
| Ferencváros | 2021–22 | Nemzeti Bajnokság I | 3 | 0 | 0 | 0 | 3 | 0 | — | | 6 | 0 |
| Ferencváros | 2022–23 | Nemzeti Bajnokság I | 12 | 0 | 1 | 0 | 0 | 0 | — | | 13 | 0 |
| Ferencváros | 2023–24 | Nemzeti Bajnokság I | 10 | 1 | 1 | 1 | 12 (Note: One appearance in UEFA Champions League, eleven appearances and one goal in UEFA Europa Conference League) | 1 | — | | 23 | 3 |
| Ferencváros | Total | | 99 | 9 | 9 | 2 | 37 | 4 | — | | 145 | 15 |
| Fehérvár | 2023–24 | Nemzeti Bajnokság I | 14 | 0 | — | | — | | — | | 14 | 0 |
| Sepsi OSK | 2024–25 | Liga I | 25 | 1 | 0 | 0 | — | | — | | 25 | 1 |
| Sepsi OSK | 2025–26 | Liga II | 13 | 0 | 1 | 0 | — | | — | | 14 | 0 |
| Sepsi OSK | 2026–27 | Liga I | 0 | 0 | 0 | 0 | — | | — | | 0 | 0 |
| Sepsi OSK | Total | | 38 | 1 | 1 | 0 | — | | — | | 39 | 1 |
| Career total | | | 392 | 37 | 27 | 4 | 37 | 4 | 9 | 0 | 465 | 45 |

=== International ===
As of match played 15 June 2021.

Appearances and goals by national team and year
| National team | Year | Apps | Goals |
|---|---|---|---|
| Hungary | 2019 | 2 | 0 |
| Hungary | 2020 | 7 | 1 |
| Hungary | 2021 | 5 | 0 |
| Total | | 14 | 1 |

Scores and results list Hungary's goal tally first, score column indicates score after each Sigér goal.

List of international goals scored by Dávid Sigér
| No. | Date | Venue | Cap | Opponent | Score | Result | Competition |
|---|---|---|---|---|---|---|---|
| 1 | 18 November 2020 | Puskás Aréna, Budapest, Hungary | 9 | Turkey | 1–0 | 2–0 | 2020–21 UEFA Nations League B |

== Honours ==
Mezőkövesd

- Nemzeti Bajnokság II: 2012–13

Ferencváros

- Nemzeti Bajnokság I: 2018–19, 2019–20, 2020–21, 2021–22, 2022–23
- Magyar Kupa: 2021-22
