= Isael (footballer) =

Brazilian footballer (born 1988)

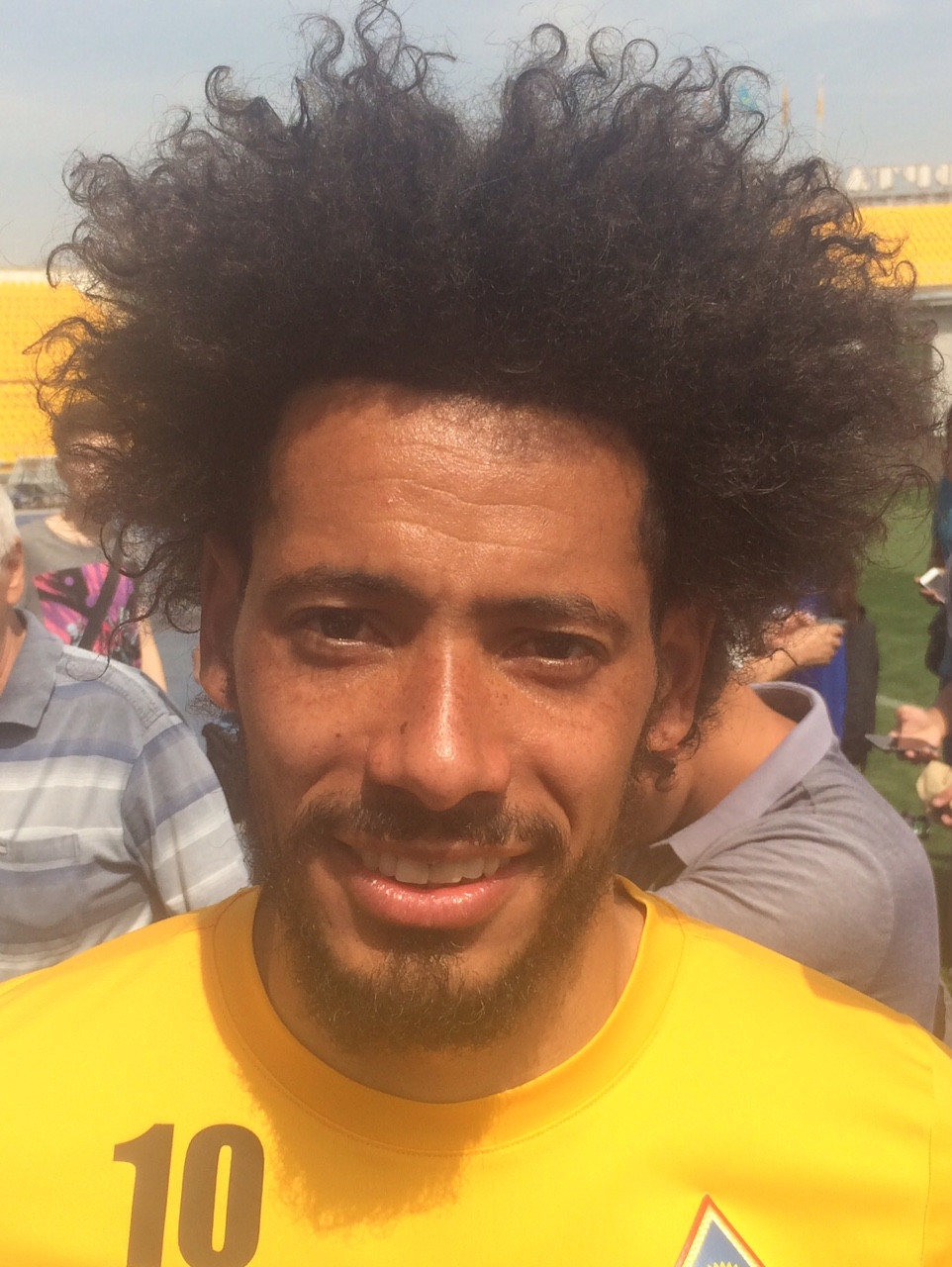
- Isael in 2017

Personal information
- Full name: Isael da Silva Barbosa
- Date of birth: 13 May 1988 (age 38)
- Place of birth: São Paulo, Brazil
- Height: 1.71 m (5 ft 7 in)
- Position: Midfielder

Team information
- Current team: Noroeste

Youth career
- –2006: PSTC
- 2006–2009: Grêmio

Senior career*
| Years | Team | Apps | (Gls) |
| 2009–2011 | Grêmio | 2 | (0) |
| 2009–2010 | → Sport Recife (loan) | 5 | (0) |
| 2010–2011 | → Giresunspor (loan) | 12 | (1) |
| 2011–2012 | Coritiba | 0 | (0) |
| 2011 | → Fortaleza (loan) | 2 | (0) |
| 2012 | → São Caetano (loan) | 11 | (1) |
| 2012–2013 | Nacional da Madeira | 12 | (3) |
| 2013–2014 | Krasnodar | 21 | (2) |
| 2014–2018 | Kairat | 129 | (39) |
| 2019–2021 | Ferencváros | 64 | (14) |
| 2021–2022 | Umm Salal | 20 | (6) |
| 2022–2023 | Al-Jabalain | 30 | (6) |
| 2023–2024 | Noroeste | 27 | (4) |
| 2024 | Juventus-SC | 12 | (3) |
| 2024–2025 | Hajer | | |
| 2025– | Noroeste | | |
- * Club domestic league appearances and goals as of 9 May 2021

Isael da Silva Barbosa (born 13 May 1988), most commonly known as Isael, is a BrazilIan professional footballer who plays as a midfielder for Noroeste.

== Career ==
=== Early career ===
Isael was born in São Paulo, Brazil. He is a Grêmio youth product.

=== Krasnodar ===
On 31 January 2013, Isael signed an 18-month contract with FC Krasnodar. On 19 May 2014, at the expiration of his contract, he left Krasnodar.

=== Kairat ===
On 23 June 2014, Isael signed a six-month contract with FC Kairat in the Kazakhstan Premier League. On 30 July 2015, he extended his stay at Kairat until December 2018. He left Kairat at the end of his contract.

=== Ferencváros ===
On 1 February 2019, Isael signed with Ferencvárosi TC.

On 16 June 2020, he became champion with Ferencváros by beating Budapest Honvéd FC at the Hidegkuti Nándor Stadion on the 30th match day of the 2019–20 Nemzeti Bajnokság I season.

=== Al-Jabalain ===
On 29 July 2022, Isael joined Saudi First Division side Al-Jabalain.

=== Noroeste ===
On 17 May 2023, Isael joined Noroeste.

=== Hajer ===
On 11 September 2024, Isael joined Saudi Second Division club Hajer.

== Career statistics ==
As of match played 9 May 2021

Appearances and goals by club, season and competition
| Club | Season | League | | | National cup | | League cup | | Continental | | Other | | Total | |
| Club | Season | Division | Apps | Goals | Apps | Goals | Apps | Goals | Apps | Goals | Apps | Goals | Apps | Goals |
|---|---|---|---|---|---|---|---|---|---|---|---|---|---|---|
| Giresunspor (loan) | 2010–11 | TFF First League | 12 | 1 | 1 | 0 | – | | – | | – | | 13 | 1 |
| Nacional | 2012–13 | Primeira Liga | 12 | 3 | 0 | 0 | 3 | 0 | – | | – | | 15 | 3 |
| Krasnodar | 2012–13 | Russian Premier League | 8 | 1 | 0 | 0 | – | | – | | – | | 8 | 1 |
| Krasnodar | 2013–14 | Russian Premier League | 13 | 1 | 2 | 1 | – | | – | | – | | 15 | 2 |
| Krasnodar | Total | | 21 | 2 | 2 | 1 | 0 | 0 | 0 | 0 | 0 | 0 | 23 | 3 |
| Kairat | 2014 | Kazakhstan Premier League | 14 | 5 | 3 | 1 | – | | 4 | 0 | 0 | 0 | 21 | 6 |
| Kairat | 2015 | Kazakhstan Premier League | 27 | 6 | 3 | 1 | – | | 8 | 0 | 1 | 0 | 39 | 7 |
| Kairat | 2016 | Kazakhstan Premier League | 29 | 7 | 3 | 1 | – | | 4 | 0 | 1 | 0 | 37 | 8 |
| Kairat | 2017 | Kazakhstan Premier League | 31 | 8 | 4 | 0 | – | | 4 | 0 | 1 | 0 | 40 | 8 |
| Kairat | 2018 | Kazakhstan Premier League | 28 | 13 | 0 | 0 | – | | 5 | 0 | 1 | 0 | 34 | 13 |
| Kairat | Total | | 129 | 39 | 13 | 3 | 0 | 0 | 25 | 0 | 4 | 0 | 171 | 42 |
| Ferencváros | 2018–19 | Nemzeti Bajnokság I | 9 | 1 | 3 | 0 | – | | 0 | 0 | – | | 12 | 1 |
| Ferencváros | 2019–20 | Nemzeti Bajnokság I | 27 | 7 | 2 | 0 | – | | 7 | 0 | – | | 36 | 7 |
| Ferencváros | 2020–21 | Nemzeti Bajnokság I | 28 | 6 | 2 | 0 | – | | 10 | 0 | – | | 40 | 6 |
| Ferencváros | Total | | 64 | 14 | 7 | 0 | 0 | 0 | 17 | 0 | 0 | 0 | 88 | 14 |
| Career total | | | 238 | 59 | 23 | 4 | 3 | 0 | 42 | 0 | 4 | 0 | 310 | 63 |

== Honours ==
Sport Recife

- Campeonato Pernambucano: 2010

FC Kairat

- Kazakhstan Cup: 2014, 2015, 2017, 2018

Ferencváros

- Nemzeti Bajnokság I: 2018–19, 2019–20, 2020–21
