= Davide Lanzafame =

Italian footballer (born 1987)

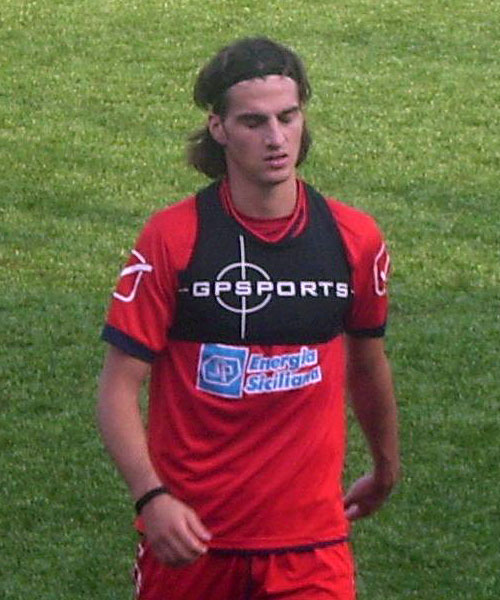
- Lanzafame with Catania

Personal information
- Date of birth: 9 February 1987 (age 39)
- Place of birth: Turin, Italy
- Height: 1.80 m (5 ft 11 in)
- Positions: Second striker; winger

Team information
- Current team: Borgaro (head coach)

Youth career
- Juventus

Senior career*
Years	Team	Apps	(Gls)
2006–2008	Juventus	1	(0)
2007–2008	→ Bari (loan)	37	(10)
2008–2011	Palermo	9	(0)
2009	→ Bari (loan)	18	(2)
2009–2010	→ Parma (loan)	27	(7)
2010–2011	→ Juventus (loan)	3	(0)
2011	→ Brescia (loan)	13	(0)
2011–2013	Catania	11	(1)
2012–2013	→ Grosseto (loan)	16	(2)
2013	→ Budapest Honvéd (loan)	10	(5)
2014–2015	Perugia	41	(1)
2016	Novara	16	(0)
2016–2018	Budapest Honvéd	57	(29)
2018–2020	Ferencváros	28	(16)
2019–2020	→ Budapest Honvéd (loan)	23	(11)
2020–2021	Adana Demirspor	9	(1)
2021–2022	Vicenza	15	(2)

International career
2008–2009	Italy U-21	7	(1)

Managerial career
- 2022: Pestszentimre
- 2023–: Borgaro
- * Club domestic league appearances and goals

Davide Lanzafame (Italian pronunciation: [ˈdaːvide lantsaˈfaːme]; born 9 February 1987) is an Italian football coach and former professional player, who played as a striker or right winger. He is in charge of Eccellenza amateurs Borgaro.

== Playing career ==
=== Juventus ===
Lanzafame, born in Turin to a Catanese father and a Piedmontese mother, grew up in the Juventus youth team and had been part of the Juventus youth side, competing in competitions such as Campionato Nazionale Primavera until 2006, before making his senior team debut for Juve during their 2006–07 season in Serie B campaign. Italy Under-21 boss Pierluigi Casiraghi called him up for the 2008 Toulon Tournament and listed him as a reserve player for the Olympics that summer.

=== Bari ===
Ahead of the 2007–08 Serie A season, Juventus loaned Lanzafame to Serie B side Bari. Lanzafame endured a highly successful loan spell in which he made 37 league appearances, scoring ten goals. In April 2008, coach Antonio Conte compared him to Cristiano Ronaldo, stating that he has the possibility and potential to reach similar levels in his football and quoting "Lanzafame has improved tactically” to La Gazzetta dello Sport. “He is explosive; he sniffs the goal and imposes his speed outside the area. If he improves and learns he can become like Cristiano Ronaldo." Lanzafame returned to Turin on 30 June 2008.

=== Palermo ===
On 1 July 2008, Palermo announced to have finalized the signing of Lanzafame from Juventus in a co-ownership deal, for €2.5 million, as part of the deal that saw Amauri move to Juventus, while Antonio Nocerino also transferred outright to Palermo . After a disappointing time with Palermo during the first half of the 2008–09 Serie A season, where Lanzafame saw little playing time and no first team action, co-owners, Juventus, ensured that a loan deal was executed, also wanting their youth product to remain in Serie A. On 26 December 2008, he moved from Palermo to Bari on loan for the remainder of the season. Lanzafame underwent a second successful spell with A.S. Bari, making 18 league appearances and scoring two goals. Following his second return from Bari, Lanzafame returned to Palermo, only to be loaned out to Serie A side, F.C. Parma. In his first full season of Serie A football, Lanzafame impressed, scoring seven goals in 27 league matches. He also scored against his parent club in a 3–2 win for Parma over Juventus on 9 May 2010.

=== Return to Juventus ===
On 25 June 2010, Palermo and Juventus agreed to extend the co-ownership deal for another year, with the Sicilian club loaning the player to the Bianconeri for the 2010–11 season. Lanzafame was expected to be a part of the building project of the new Juventus management, however, after just three league appearances in 5 months for Juventus, he was loaned to Brescia Calcio for the remainder of the 2010–11 Serie A season. Lanzafame made 13 appearances with Brescia, but failed to score. At the end of the season, he returned to Palermo. Following his second comeback to Palermo in June 2011, his co-ownership was resolved in favour of the Rosanero for free.

=== Catania ===
On 10 August 2011, Palermo confirmed to have sold Lanzafame to Catania on a co-ownership basis, for €1 million, as part of the deal that saw Matías Silvestre move in the opposite direction. Lanzafame was officially presented on 12 August 2011, alongside Mario Paglialunga and David Suazo. Upon joining his maternal descent-based club, Lanzafame made just 11 appearances and scored 1 goal during the 2011-12 Serie A season. In June 2012 Catania acquired him outright for free.

Lanzafame was successively loaned to Serie B side Grosseto on 9 September 2012. He was a mainstay in the club's lineup, appearing in 16 matches and scoring 2 league goals during the first half of the 2012–13 Serie B season, before returning to Catania in January 2013. He was then immediately loaned out to Hungarian outfit, Budapest Honvéd at the request of coach Marco Rossi. At the club, Lanzafame teamed up with former Juventus youth teammate Raffaele Alcibiade.

=== Match-fixing scandal ===
When Budapest Honvéd learned that Lanzafame had been accused of manipulating matches during his time with Bari by FIGC, they terminated his loan deal, which would have run until 30 June, a month in advance. Lanzafame had scored five league goals in ten matches for the club before returning to Sicily. Upon returning to Catania, Lanzafame's fate regarding the match-fixing was officially learned on 5 July 2013. Prosecutor Stefano Palazzi had requested a four-year ban; however, Lanzafame saw his plea bargain accepted and will be suspended for 16 months with a €40,000 fine.

=== Perugia ===
On 12 August 2014, Lanzafame signed with Serie B club Perugia, joining Marco Rossi who also involved in the aforementioned scandal. The contract of Lanzafame was extended on 13 March 2015, which would last until 30 June 2017.

=== Budapest Honvéd ===
In 2016, Lanzafame returned to Budapest Honvéd FC and won the 2016–17 Nemzeti Bajnokság I season with the club.

He scored his first goal in the UEFA Champions League in the 2017–18 UEFA Champions League season against Hapoel Be'er Sheva F.C. at the Turner Stadium.

He became the top scorer of the 2017–18 Nemzeti Bajnokság I season by scoring 18 goals. Before the last round, there were three players with 17 goals (Roland Varga of Ferencváros, and Soma Novothny of Újpest). However, none of the three players scored goals in the 33rd round, except for Lanzafame who scored a free-kick goal against Vasas SC.

=== Ferencváros ===
On 1 July 2018, Lanzafame was signed by Nemzeti Bajnokság I club Ferencváros. In an interview with the Nemzeti Sport, he said that he made his most difficult decision in his career so far after signing with Ferencváros.

=== Budapest Honvéd ===
On 12 August 2019, Lanzafame was returned for the third time to Nemzeti Bajnokság I club Budapest Honvéd FC.

=== Adana Demirspor ===
On 25 September 2020, Lanzafame was join to club Adana Demirspor.

=== Vicenza ===
On 1 February 2021, Lanzafame signed with Italian club Vicenza on a free transfer. On 22 January 2022, his contract with Vicenza was terminated by mutual consent after he missed most of the season up to that point due to injury.

== Managerial career ==
In 2022, Lanzafame took on his first head coaching job, being named in charge of Hungary amateur club Pestszentimré, a position he left by the end of the year.

In May 2023, Lanzafame returned to Italy, accepting a head coaching job at Eccellenza Piedmont amateurs Borgaro.

== Career statistics ==
As of match played 9 June 2020

Appearances and goals by club, season and competition
Club	Season	League			National cup		League cup		Europe		Total	
Club	Season	Division	Apps	Goals	Apps	Goals	Apps	Goals	Apps	Goals	Apps	Goals
Juventus	2006–07	Serie B	1	0	0	0	–		–		1	0
Bari (loan)	2007–08	Serie B	37	10	1	1	–		–		38	11
Palermo	2008–09	Serie A	9	0	1	0	–		–		10	0
Bari (loan)	2008–09	Serie B	18	2	0	0	–		–		18	2
Parma (loan)	2009–10	Serie A	27	7	1	0	–		–		28	7
Juventus (loan)	2010–11	Serie A	3	0	0	0	–		6	0	9	0
Brescia (loan)	2010–11	Serie A	13	0	0	0	–		–		13	0
Catania	2011–12	Serie A	11	1	2	1	–		–		13	2
Grosseto (loan)	2012–13	Serie B	16	2	0	0	–		–		16	2
Budapest Honvéd (loan)	2012–13	Nemzeti Bajnokság I	10	5	2	0	1	1	–		13	6
Perugia	2014–15	Serie B	24	1	1	0	–		–		25	1
Perugia	2015–16	Serie B	17	0	2	1	–		–		19	1
Perugia	Total		41	1	3	1	0	0	0	0	44	2
Novara	2015–16	Serie B	16	0	0	0	–		–		16	0
Budapest Honvéd	2016–17	Nemzeti Bajnokság I	25	11	2	1	–		–		27	12
Budapest Honvéd	2017–18	Nemzeti Bajnokság I	32	18	7	2	–		2	2	41	22
Budapest Honvéd	2019–20	Nemzeti Bajnokság I	23	11	7	2	–		0	0	30	13
Budapest Honvéd	Total		80	40	16	5	0	0	2	2	98	47
Ferencváros	2018–19	Nemzeti Bajnokság I	28	16	4	1	–		2	0	34	17
Ferencváros	2019–20	Nemzeti Bajnokság I	0	0	0	0	–		5	2	5	2
Ferencváros	Total		28	16	4	1	0	0	!7	2	39	19
Career total			310	84	30	9	1	1	15	4	353	98

== Honours ==
Budapest Honvéd

- Nemzeti Bajnokság I: 2016–17
- Hungarian Cup: 2019–20

Ferencváros

- Nemzeti Bajnokság I: 2018–19

Individual

- Nemzeti Bajnokság I top scorer: 2017–18, 2018–19
