= Abraham Frimpong =

Ghanaian footballer

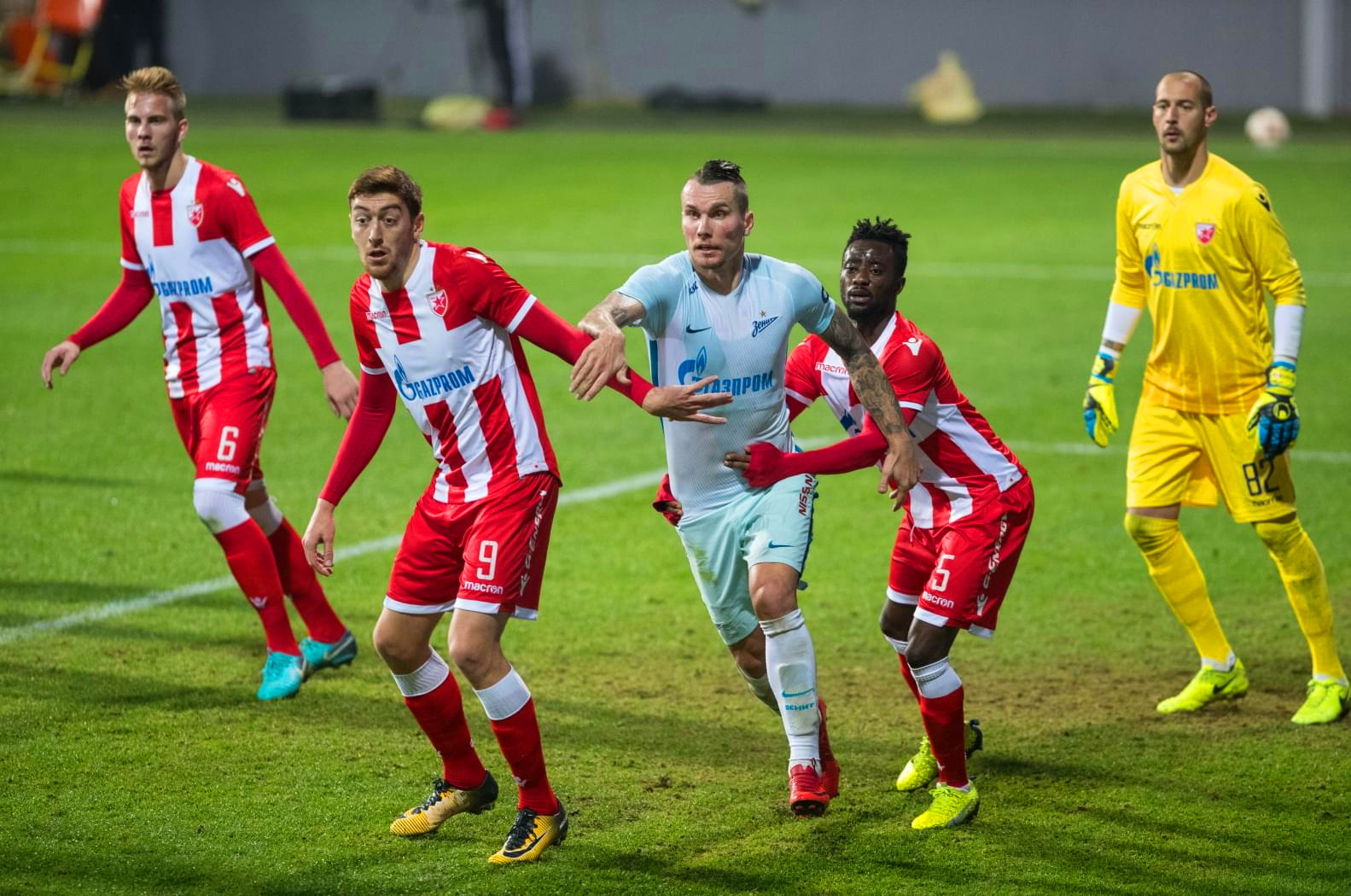
- Frimpong (5) with Red Star Belgrade in 2018

Personal information
- Full name: Abraham Akwasi Frimpong
- Date of birth: 6 April 1993 (age 33)
- Place of birth: Accra, Ghana
- Height: 1.85 m (6 ft 1 in)
- Position: Centre-back

Team information
- Current team: Dinamo Batumi

Youth career
- 2010–2011: Vicenza

Senior career*
Years	Team	Apps	(Gls)
2011	Vojvodina	0	(0)
2012–2016	Napredak Kruševac	87	(0)
2017–2018	Red Star Belgrade	25	(1)
2018–2021	Ferencváros	39	(2)
2021	Al-Ain	9	(0)
2022–	Dinamo Batumi	0	(0)
- * Club domestic league appearances and goals as of 8 February 2022

Abraham Akwasi Frimpong (born 6 April 1993) is a Ghanaian professional footballer who plays as a centre-back for Dinamo Batumi.

== Career ==
Born in Accra, he played in Italy with Vicenza Calcio youth team in the season 2010–11. In summer 2011 he was on trials at Serbian champions FK Partizan, however, after staying for a month in the club, in early August he left and joined another Serbian top-tier club, FK Vojvodina. In Vojvodina he did not got a chance to debut in the league.

=== Napredak ===
During the following winter break, in 2012, he moved to FK Napredak Kruševac, playing back then in the Serbian First League but with ambitions of returning to the SuperLiga. This would be achieved at the end of the 2012–13 season when Napredak finished top, and thus won promotion to the 2013–14 Serbian SuperLiga.

=== Red Star Belgrade ===
After five years playing with Napredak, Frimpong signed with Red Star Belgrade on 13 January 2017. Frimpong scored first goal in his professional career in 3–1 victory over OFK Bačka on 13 August 2017.

=== Ferencváros ===
On 16 June 2018, Frimpong moved to Hungarian side Ferencváros.

On 16 June 2020, he became champion with Ferencváros by beating Budapest Honvéd FC at the Hidegkuti Nándor Stadion on the 30th match day of the 2019–20 Nemzeti Bajnokság I season.

=== Al-Ain ===
On 1 February 2021, Frimpong joined Saudi Arabian side Al-Ain on a three-year deal.

=== Dinamo Batumi ===
On 8 February 2022, Dinamo Batumi announced the signing of Frimpong.

== Career statistics ==
As of 19 December 2020

Appearances and goals by club, season and competition
Club	Season	League			Cup		Continental		Other		Total	
Club	Season	Division	Apps	Goals	Apps	Goals	Apps	Goals	Apps	Goals	Apps	Goals
Vojvodina	2011–12	Serbian SuperLiga	0	0	0	0	0	0	—		0	0
Napredak Kruševac	2011–12	Serbian First League	9	0	—		—		—		9	0
Napredak Kruševac	2012–13	Serbian First League	9	0	1	0	—		—		10	0
Napredak Kruševac	2013–14	Serbian SuperLiga	21	0	1	0	—		—		22	0
Napredak Kruševac	2014–15	Serbian SuperLiga	17	0	1	0	—		1 (Note: Including an appearance in the relegation play-off)	0	19	0
Napredak Kruševac	2015–16	Serbian First League	18	0	2	0	—		—		20	0
Napredak Kruševac	2016–17	Serbian SuperLiga	13	0	0	0	—		—		13	0
Napredak Kruševac	Total		87	0	5	0	—		1	0	93	0
Red Star Belgrade	2016–17	Serbian SuperLiga	14	0	3	0	—		—		17	0
Red Star Belgrade	2017–18	Serbian SuperLiga	11	1	2	0	3	0	—		16	1
Red Star Belgrade	Total		25	1	5	0	3	0	—		33	1
Ferencváros	2018–19	Nemzeti Bajnokság I	13	1	1	0	2	0	—		16	1
Ferencváros	2019–20	Nemzeti Bajnokság I	19	0	2	0	5	0	—		26	0
Ferencváros	2020–21	Nemzeti Bajnokság I	7	1	1	0	5	0	—		13	1
Ferencváros	Total		39	2	4	0	12	0	—		55	2
Career total			151	3	14	0	15	0	2	0	182	3

== Honours ==
Napredak

- Serbian First League: 2012–13, 2015–16

Red Star Belgrade

- Serbian SuperLiga: 2017–18

Ferencváros

- NB I: 2018–19, 2019–20, 2020–21
