= István Lakatos =

Hungarian footballer (born 1999)

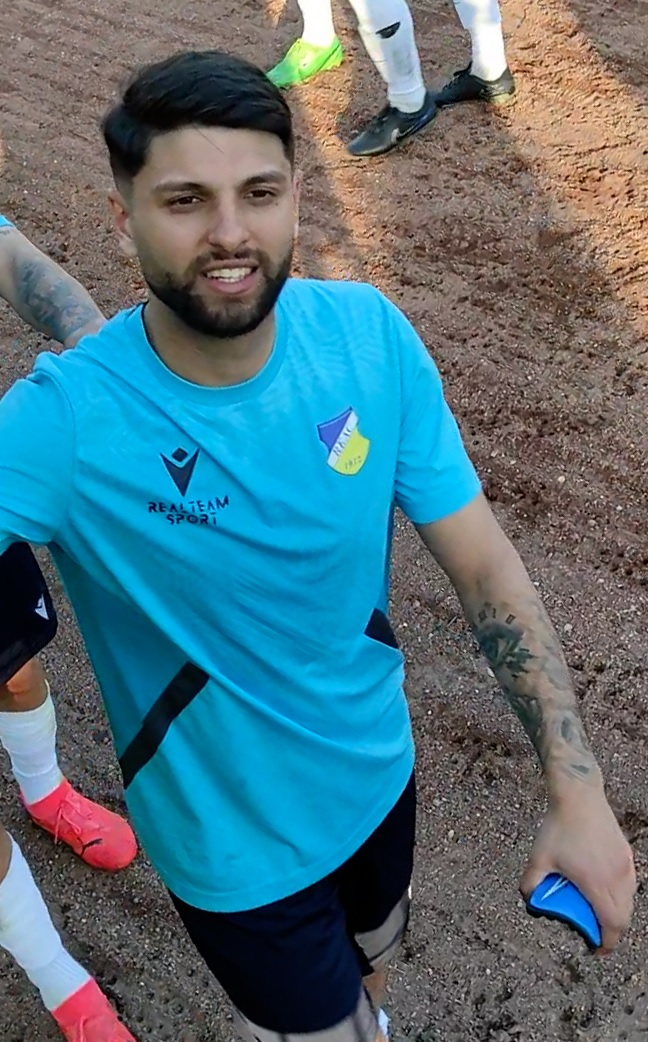
- Lakatos with Rákospalota in 2025

Personal information
- Date of birth: 4 April 1999 (age 27)
- Place of birth: Budapest, Hungary
- Height: 1.73 m (5 ft 8 in)
- Position: Left winger

Team information
- Current team: Rákospalota
- Number: 77

Youth career
- 2009–2011: Inter CDF
- 2011–2015: Ferencváros

Senior career*
Years	Team	Apps	(Gls)
2015–2019	Ferencváros	1	(0)
2016–2019	Ferencváros II	12	(0)
2017–2019	→ Soroksár (loan)	50	(3)
2019–2021	Ajka	9	(0)
2021–2023	Szolnok	68	(7)
2023–2024	Gyöngyös	16	(6)
2024–	Rákospalota	23	(12)

International career^{‡}
2014	Hungary U15	2	(0)
2014–2015	Hungary U16	7	(1)
2015	Hungary U17	12	(2)
2017	Hungary U18	6	(1)
2018	Hungary U19	1	(0)
- * Club domestic league appearances and goals as of 12 April 2025 ‡ National team caps and goals as of 21 March 2018

István Lakatos (born 4 April 1999) is a Hungarian professional footballer who plays for Rákospalota.

== Club career ==
On 17 June 2015, Lakatos signed a professional contract with Márk Nyéki and Ádám Varga with Nemzeti Bajnokság I club Ferencváros. Before the deal, he contributed to the Ligakupa success last season. On 26 September 2015, when he was 16 years old, Lakatos played in his first game in the Nemzeti Bajnokság I against Puskás Akadémia which ended with a 0–0 draw away from home.

He spent two loan spells with Ferencváros's feeder club Soroksár in the Nemzeti Bajnokság II between 2017 and 2019.

On 31 July 2023, the newly promoted Nemzeti Bajnokság III club Gyöngyös signed him to strengthen their attacking section.

== International career ==
Lakatos was capped by Hungary's youth teams at under-15, under-16, under-17, under-18 and under-19 levels.

He represented the under-18 team at the 2017 Panda Cup in China, where Hungary were the winners.

== Career statistics ==
As of match played 12 April 2025

Appearances and goals by club, season and competition
Club	Season	League			Magyar Kupa		Ligakupa		Other		Total	
Club	Season	Division	Apps	Goals	Apps	Goals	Apps	Goals	Apps	Goals	Apps	Goals
Ferencváros	2014–15	Nemzeti Bajnokság I	—		—		2	0	—		2	0
Ferencváros	2015–16	Nemzeti Bajnokság I	1	0	2	1	—		—		3	1
Ferencváros	Total		1	0	2	1	2	0	—		5	1
Ferencváros II	2016–17	Nemzeti Bajnokság III	12	0	—		—		—		12	0
Soroksár (loan)	2017–18	Nemzeti Bajnokság II	33	2	1	0	—		—		34	2
Soroksár (loan)	2018–19	Nemzeti Bajnokság II	17	1	5	2	—		—		22	3
Soroksár (loan)	Total		50	3	6	2	—		—		56	5
Ajka	2019–20	Nemzeti Bajnokság II	3	0	—		—		—		3	0
Ajka	2020–21	Nemzeti Bajnokság II	6	0	2	1	—		—		8	1
Ajka	Total		9	0	2	1	—		—		11	1
Szolnok	2020–21	Nemzeti Bajnokság II	12	1	1	0	—		—		13	1
Szolnok	2021–22	Nemzeti Bajnokság II	32	4	1	0	—		—		33	4
Szolnok	2022–23	Nemzeti Bajnokság III	24	2	1	0	—		—		25	2
Szolnok	Total		68	7	3	0	—		—		71	7
Gyöngyös	2023–24	Nemzeti Bajnokság III	16	6	—		—		—		16	6
Rákospalota	2024–25	Megyei Bajnokság I	23	12	—		—		3 (Note: Appearances in Budapest Kupa)	2	26	14
Career total			179	28	13	4	2	0	3	2	197	34

== Honours ==
Ferencváros

- Nemzeti Bajnokság I: 2015–16
- Magyar Kupa: 2015–16
- Ligakupa: 2014–15
