= Nikolay Signevich =

Belarusian footballer

Personal information
- Full name: Nikolay Yevgenyevich Signevich
- Date of birth: 20 February 1992 (age 34)
- Place of birth: Brest, Belarus
- Height: 1.94 m (6 ft 4 1/2 in)
- Position: Forward

Team information
- Current team: Tobol
- Number: 14

Youth career
- 2009–2011: Dinamo Brest

Senior career*
Years	Team	Apps	(Gls)
2011–2013	Dinamo Brest	45	(11)
2014–2018	BATE Borisov	98	(29)
2017	→ Platanias (loan)	16	(2)
2019–2020	Ferencváros	32	(5)
2020	Khimki	2	(0)
2020–2021	BATE Borisov	26	(6)
2022–2023	Apollon Smyrnis	21	(1)
2024	Atyrau	24	(10)
2025–	Tobol	17	(8)

International career^{‡}
2012–2013	Belarus U21	12	(1)
2014–2021	Belarus	21	(1)
- * Club domestic league appearances and goals as of 2 November 2025 ‡ National team caps and goals as of 31 March 2021

Nikolay Yevgenyevich Signevich (Belarusian: Мікалай Яўгенавіч Сігневіч; Russian: Николай Евгеньевич Сигневич; born 20 February 1992) is a Belarusian professional footballer who plays as a forward for Tobol.

== Club career ==
On 8 September 2020, he signed with Russian Premier League club FC Khimki.

On 28 September 2020, he returned to BATE Borisov.

=== Ferencváros ===
On 16 June 2020, he became champion with Ferencváros by beating Budapest Honvéd FC at the Hidegkuti Nándor Stadion on the 30th match day of the 2019–20 Nemzeti Bajnokság I season.

== International career ==
Signevich made his debut for the senior national side of his country on 15 November 2014, in the away match against Spain in a UEFA Euro 2016 qualifier, coming on as a second-half substitute for Sergei Kornilenko.

== Honours ==
BATE Borisov

- Belarusian Premier League champion: 2014, 2015, 2016, 2017, 2018
- Belarusian Cup winner: 2014–15, 2020–21
- Belarusian Super Cup winner: 2014

Ferencváros

- Nemzeti Bajnokság I champion: 2018–19

== International goal ==
Scores and results list Belarus' goal tally first.

#	Date	Venue	Opponent	Score	Result	Competition
1	18 November 2014	Borisov Arena, Barysaw, Belarus	Mexico	2–2	3–2	Friendly
