= Lasha Dvali =

Georgian footballer (born 1995)

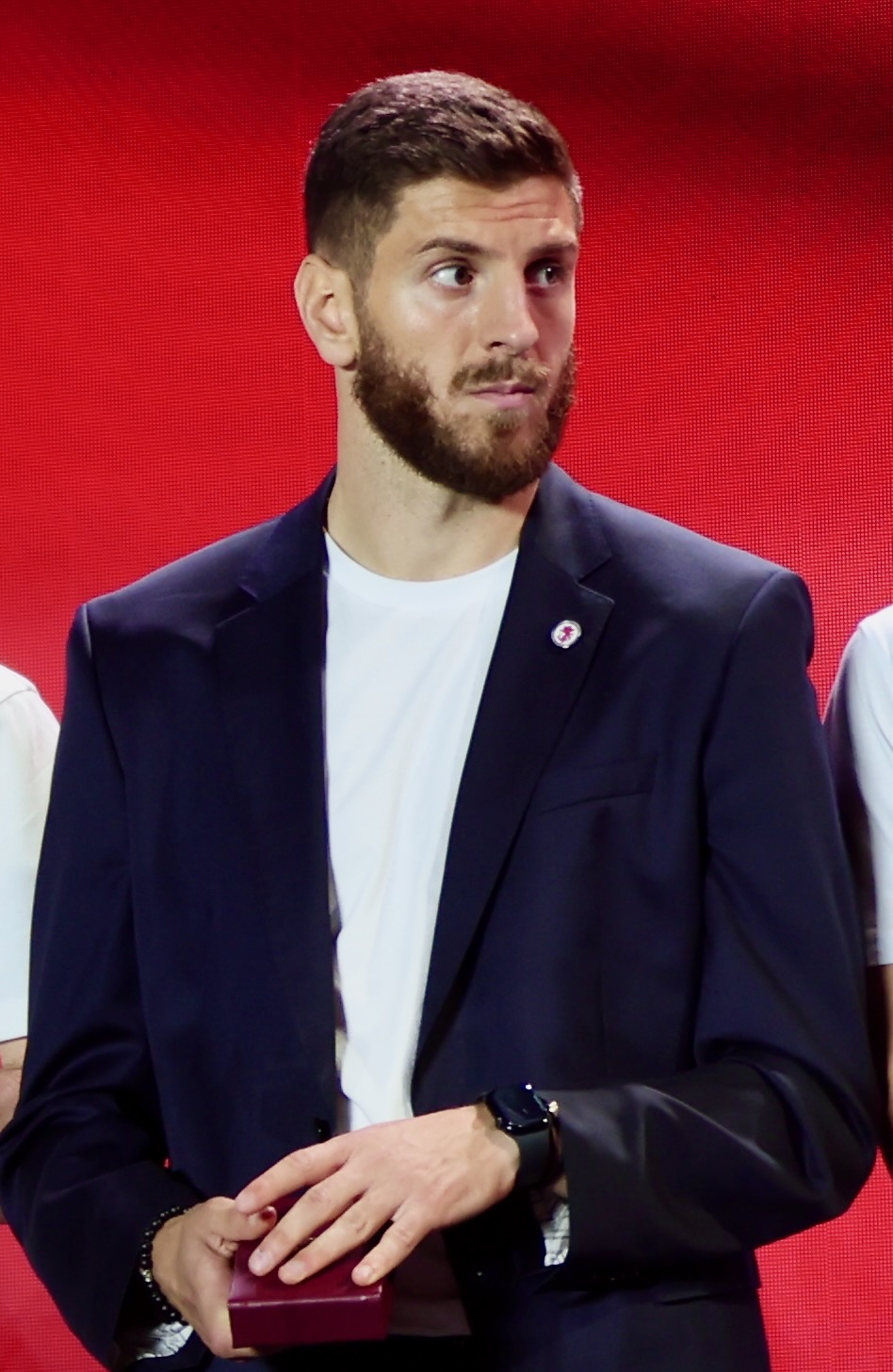
- Dvali after being awarded the Order of Honor by the President of Georgia, 2024.

Personal information
- Date of birth: 14 May 1995 (age 31)
- Place of birth: Tbilisi, Georgia
- Height: 1.91 m (6 ft 3 in)
- Position: Centre-back

Team information
- Current team: CSKA 1948
- Number: 3

Youth career
- 2001–2008: Saburtalo
- 2008–2012: Metalurgi Rustavi

Senior career*
Years	Team	Apps	(Gls)
2013	Skonto	5	(0)
2013–2015	Reading	0	(0)
2014–2015	→ Skonto (loan)	32	(3)
2015	→ Kasımpaşa (loan)	10	(1)
2015	MSV Duisburg	1	(0)
2016–2017	Śląsk Wrocław	34	(2)
2017	→ Irtysh Pavlodar (loan)	16	(0)
2017–2018	Pogoń Szczecin	46	(3)
2017	Pogoń Szczecin II	1	(0)
2019–2022	Ferencváros	40	(2)
2022–2025	APOEL	72	(7)
2025–	CSKA 1948	28	(2)

International career^{‡}
2011–2012	Georgia U17	8	(0)
2012–2013	Georgia U19	10	(0)
2014–2016	Georgia U21	8	(0)
2015–	Georgia	53	(1)
- * Club domestic league appearances and goals as of 19:02, 25 September 2026 (UTC) ‡ National team caps and goals as of 19:30, 14 November 2026 (UTC)

Lasha Dvali (Order of Honor) (Georgian: ლაშა დვალი, romanized: lasha dvali, pronounced [laʃa dʷali]; born 14 May 1995) is a Georgian professional footballer who plays as a centre-back for Bulgarian First League club CSKA 1948 Sofia, which he captains, and the Georgia national team.

== Club career ==
In June 2013, Dvali moved to Latvian Higher League side FC Skonto, before moving again three months later to English Championship side Reading. Reading loaned Dvali back to Skonto in February 2014, for the 2014 season, before he was again loaned out in February 2015, this time to Süper Lig side Kasımpaşa for the remainder of the 2014–15 season.

On 31 August 2015, Dvali signed a one-year contract, with the option of a second, with German 2. Bundesliga side MSV Duisburg. The contract was voided on 21 December 2015. He joined Śląsk Wrocław on 13 January 2016.

On 3 March 2017, he was loaned to Irtysh Pavlodar, with the deal expiring on 11 June 2017.

On 24 July 2017, he moved to Pogoń Szczecin.

On 30 January 2019, Dvali transferred to Ferencváros. On 16 June 2020, he became champion with Ferencváros by beating Budapest Honvéd at the Hidegkuti Nándor Stadion on the 30th match day of the 2019–20 Nemzeti Bajnokság I season. On 20 April 2021, he won the 2020-21 Nemzeti Bajnokság I season with Ferencváros by beating archrival Újpest FC 3–0 at the Groupama Arena.

In July 2022, Dvali joined Cypriot club APOEL as a free agent on a year-long deal. The 2024 season turned out especially memorable as he secured the league and the Super Cup titles with the team.

== International career ==
Dvali was called up for the Georgian national team in October 2014 for the game against Gibraltar, having previously missed out on the squad to face Scotland due to visa problems in travelling to Scotland.

He made his debut on 29 March 2015 in a European qualifier against reigning World Cup champions Germany, replacing the injured Aleksandre Amisulashvili after four minutes in a 2–0 defeat at the Boris Paichadze Dinamo Arena in his native Tbilisi.

On 13 November 2017, Dvali netted his first goal for the team in a friendly match against Belarus held in Kutaisi.

On 26 March 2024, Dvali scored Georgia's fourth penalty in the penalty shoot-out against Greece in a 0–0 (4–2 after penalties) win that sent Georgia to UEFA Euro 2024, the first major tournament in the country's history.

== Career statistics ==
=== Club ===
As of match played 18 September 2026

Appearances and goals by club, season and competition
Club	Season	League			National cup (Note: Includes Latvian Cup, Polish Cup, Kazakhstan Cup, Magyar Kupa, Cypriot Cup, Bulgarian Cup)		Europe		Total	
Club	Season	Division	Apps	Goals	Apps	Goals	Apps	Goals	Apps	Goals
Skonto Riga	2013	Latvian Higher League	3	0	3	0	0	0	6	0
Skonto Riga	2014	Latvian Higher League	32	3	1	0	2 (Note: Appearances in UEFA Europa League)	0	35	3
Skonto Riga	Total		35	3	4	0	2	0	41	3
Kasımpaşa	2014–15	Süper Lig	10	0	0	0	—		10	0
MSV Duisburg	2015–16	2. Bundesliga	1	0	0	0	—		1	0
Śląsk Wrocław	2015–16	Ekstraklasa	15	1	0	0	—		15	1
Śląsk Wrocław	2016–17	Ekstraklasa	19	1	2	0	—		21	1
Śląsk Wrocław	Total		34	2	2	0	—		36	2
Irtysh Pavlodar	2017	Kazakhstan Premier League	16	0	1	0	—		17	0
Pogoń Szczecin	2017–18	Ekstraklasa	33	2	2	0	—		35	2
Pogoń Szczecin	2018–19	Ekstraklasa	13	1	1	0	—		14	1
Pogoń Szczecin	Total		46	3	3	0	—		49	3
Pogoń Szczecin II	2017–18	III liga, gr. II	1	0	—		—		1	0
Ferencváros	2018–19	Nemzeti Bajnokság I	12	2	4	0	0	0	16	2
Ferencváros	2019–20	Nemzeti Bajnokság I	3	0	1	0	10 (Note: Six appearances in UEFA Champions League, four appearances in UEFA Europa League)	0	14	0
Ferencváros	2020–21	Nemzeti Bajnokság I	21	0	0	0	6 (Note: Appearance(s) in UEFA Champions League)	0	27	0
Ferencváros	2021–22	Nemzeti Bajnokság I	4	0	1	0	1	0	6	0
Ferencváros	Total		40	2	6	0	17	0	63	2
APOEL	2022–23	Cypriot First Division	25	4	3	0	0	0	28	4
APOEL	2023–24	Cypriot First Division	28	3	1	0	6 (Note: Appearances in UEFA Conference League)	1	35	4
APOEL	2024–25	Cypriot First Division	19	0	1	0	9 (Note: Three appearances in UEFA Champions League, two appearances in UEFA Europa League, four appearances in UEFA Conference League)	0	29	0
APOEL	Total		72	7	5	0	15	1	92	8
CSKA 1948	2025–26	Bulgarian First League	24	2	2	0	—		26	2
CSKA 1948	2026–27	Bulgarian First League	4	0	0	0	4	1	8	1
CSKA 1948	Total		28	2	2	0	4	1	34	3
Career total			283	19	23	0	38	2	344	21

=== International ===
As of match played 14 November 2026

Appearances and goals by national team and year
National team	Year	Apps	Goals
Georgia	2015	3	0
Georgia	2016	2	0
Georgia	2017	1	1
Georgia	2018	6	0
Georgia	2019	1	0
Georgia	2020	3	0
Georgia	2021	6	0
Georgia	2022	3	0
Georgia	2023	4	0
Georgia	2024	12	0
Georgia	2025	5	0
Georgia	2026	7	0
Total		53	1

Scores and results list Georgia's goal tally first, score column indicates score after each Dvali goal.

List of international goals scored by Lasha Dvali
No.	Date	Venue	Opponent	Score	Result	Competition
1	13 November 2017	Ramaz Shengelia Stadium, Kutaisi, Georgia	Belarus	2–1	2–2	Friendly

== Honours ==
Ferencvárosi

- Nemzeti Bajnokság I: 2018–19, 2019–20, 2020–21, 2021–22
- Magyar Kupa: 2021–22

APOEL

- Cypriot First Division: 2023–24
- Cypriot Super Cup: 2024
