= Matías Rodríguez (footballer, born 1993) =

Argentine footballer

Personal information
- Full name: Matías Ezequiel Rodríguez
- Date of birth: 29 March 1993 (age 33)
- Place of birth: Pablo Podestá, Argentina
- Height: 1.75 m (5 ft 9 in)
- Position: Midfielder

Team information
- Current team: All Boys

Youth career
- Chacarita Juniors

Senior career*
Years	Team	Apps	(Gls)
2013–2018	Chacarita Juniors	97	(9)
2018–2019	Ferencváros	4	(0)
2019	Universidad Católica	21	(0)
2020	Cúcuta Deportivo	13	(2)
2021–2023	Alvarado	37	(3)
2023–2026	Chacarita Juniors	58	(5)
2026–	All Boys	0	(0)
- * Club domestic league appearances and goals as of 17:51, 25 March 2026 (UTC)

Matías Ezequiel Rodríguez (born 29 March 1993) is an Argentine professional footballer who plays as a midfielder for All Boys.

== Career ==
Rodríguez began with Chacarita Juniors, with whom he made his debut with in February 2013 against Godoy Cruz in the Copa Argentina. He also made four league appearances in 2012–13, prior to twenty-three in 2013–14 as well as scoring his first two career goals versus Flandria and Nueva Chicago respectively. Sixteen appearances came in Chacarita's promotion-winning season of 2014 to Primera B Nacional, while twenty arrived three years later in 2016–17 as the club were promoted to the Argentine Primera División. His top-flight debut came against Tigre on 10 September 2017. He signed a new contract with them days later.

He made his 100th and final Chacarita appearance in May 2018, featuring in a Copa Argentina match with Deportivo Maipú. On 15 June, Rodríguez completed a transfer to Nemzeti Bajnokság I side Ferencváros of Hungary. Six appearances followed in all competitions in five months, with the midfielder leaving in January 2019 to join Universidad Católica of the Ecuadorian Serie A. His first appearance came in a win away to Técnico Universitario on 11 February, while his last would arrive on 2 November against América de Quito. January 2020 saw Rodríguez switch Ecuador for Colombia by joining Cúcuta Deportivo.

Rodríguez scored goals versus Deportivo Cali and Independiente Medellín across fifteen appearances for Cúcuta Deportivo in 2020, a campaign that ended prematurely for the club after they were liquidated. Earlier in the season, in February, the midfielder was fined $52,668,180 and suspended for two matches after being charged of deceiving the match officials to win a penalty against Alianza Petrolera on 8 February; the country's player union called the fine "disproportionate". He was the first player to be punished for that offence under new legislation. Cúcuta had previously been unable to pay wages to their squad.

In February 2021, Rodríguez returned to Argentina and joined Alvarado.

== Career statistics ==
As of 25 December 2020.

Club statistics
Club	Season	League			Cup		Continental		Other		Total	
Club	Season	Division	Apps	Goals	Apps	Goals	Apps	Goals	Apps	Goals	Apps	Goals
Chacarita Juniors	2012–13	Primera B Metropolitana	4	0	1	0	—		0	0	5	0
Chacarita Juniors	2013–14	Primera B Metropolitana	23	2	1	0	—		0	0	24	2
Chacarita Juniors	2014	Primera B Metropolitana	16	0	0	0	—		0	0	16	0
Chacarita Juniors	2015	Primera B Nacional	6	2	0	0	—		0	0	6	2
Chacarita Juniors	2016	Primera B Nacional	4	0	0	0	—		0	0	4	0
Chacarita Juniors	2016–17	Primera B Nacional	20	4	0	0	—		0	0	20	4
Chacarita Juniors	2017–18	Primera División	24	1	1	0	—		0	0	25	1
Chacarita Juniors	Total		97	9	3	0	—		0	0	100	9
Ferencváros	2018–19	Nemzeti Bajnokság I	4	0	2	0	0	0	0	0	6	0
Universidad Católica	2019	Serie A	21	0	—		5 (Note: Appearance(s) in the Copa Sudamericana)	0	0	0	26	0
Cúcuta Deportivo	2020	Categoría Primera A	13	2	2	0	0	0	0	0	15	2
Career total			135	11	7	0	5	0	0	0	147	11
