= Krisztofer Szerető =

Hungarian footballer

Personal information
- Date of birth: 10 January 2000 (age 26)
- Place of birth: Budapest, Hungary
- Height: 1.77 m (5 ft 10 in)
- Position: Midfielder

Team information
- Current team: Budafok
- Number: 17

Youth career
- 2009–2010: Csepel
- 2010–2016: Budapest Honvéd
- 2016–2019: Stoke City

Senior career*
| Years | Team | Apps | (Gls) |
| 2019–2022 | Ferencváros | 2 | (0) |
| 2020–2022 | → Soroksár (loan) | 64 | (6) |
| 2022–2023 | Nyíregyháza | 27 | (0) |
| 2023– | Budafok | 43 | (1) |

International career^{‡}
| 2015–2016 | Hungary U-16 | 13 | (0) |
| 2016–2017 | Hungary U-17 | 14 | (2) |
| 2018 | Hungary U-18 | 5 | (1) |
| 2017–2019 | Hungary U-19 | 13 | (2) |
- * Club domestic league appearances and goals as of 10 June 2025 ‡ National team caps and goals as of 6 April 2019

Krisztofer Szerető (born 10 January 2000) is a Hungarian football player who plays for Budafok.

== Career ==
=== Ferencváros ===
On 6 April 2019, Szerető played his first match for Ferencváros in a 3–0 win against Paksi FC in the Hungarian League.

On 16 June 2020, he became champion with Ferencváros by beating Budapest Honvéd FC at the Hidegkuti Nándor Stadion on the 30th match day of the 2019–20 Nemzeti Bajnokság I season.

=== Nyíregyháza ===
On 8 June 2022, Szerető signed with Nyíregyháza.

== Career statistics ==
Appearances and goals by club, season and competition
| Club | Season | League | | Cup | | Europe | | Total | |
| Club | Season | Apps | Goals | Apps | Goals | Apps | Goals | Apps | Goals |
|---|---|---|---|---|---|---|---|---|---|
Ferencváros
| Ferencváros | 2018–19 | 1 | 0 | 1 | 0 | 0 | 0 | 2 | 0 |
| Ferencváros | 2019–20 | 1 | 0 | 3 | 0 | 0 | 0 | 4 | 0 |
| Ferencváros | Total | 2 | 0 | 4 | 0 | 0 | 0 | 6 | 0 |
| Career total | | 2 | 0 | 4 | 0 | 0 | 0 | 6 | 0 |

Updated to games played as of 4 December 2019.
