= Kornél Csernik =

Hungarian footballer

Personal information
- Date of birth: 2 July 1998 (age 28)
- Place of birth: Budapest, Hungary
- Height: 1.79 m (5 ft 10 1/2 in)
- Position: Midfielder

Team information
- Current team: BVSC-Zugló
- Number: 22

Youth career
- 2004–2007: Pénzügyőr
- 2007–2016: Kelen
- 2016: Ferencváros

Senior career*
Years	Team	Apps	(Gls)
2016–2019	Ferencváros	20	(0)
2016–2017	→ Ferencváros II	17	(2)
2018	→ Soroksár (loan)	15	(2)
2019	→ Soroksár (loan)	14	(4)
2019–2022	Soroksár	78	(13)
2022–2024	Haladás	64	(7)
2024–2025	Tatabányai	28	(1)
2025–	BVSC-Zugló	29	(4)

International career^{‡}
2016–2017	Hungary U-19	7	(2)
2017	Hungary U-21	3	(0)
- * Club domestic league appearances and goals as of 31 May 2026 ‡ National team caps and goals as of 10 October 2018

Kornél Csernik (born 2 July 1998) is a Hungarian football player who plays for BVSC-Zugló.

== Career ==
=== Ferencváros ===
On 13 August 2016, Csernik played his first match for Ferencváros in a 1–2 loss against Vasas in the Hungarian League.

== Career statistics ==
Appearances and goals by club, season and competition
Club	Season	League			Cup		Europe		Total	
Club	Season	Division	Apps	Goals	Apps	Goals	Apps	Goals	Apps	Goals
Ferencváros II	2016–17	Nemzeti Bajnokság III	17	2	0	0	0	0	17	2
Soroksár	2017–18	Nemzeti Bajnokság II	15	2	0	0	0	0	15	2
Ferencváros
Ferencváros	2016–17	Nemzeti Bajnokság I	8	0	6	0	0	0	14	0
Ferencváros	2017–18	Nemzeti Bajnokság I	6	0	1	0	2	0	9	0
Ferencváros	2018–19	Nemzeti Bajnokság I	6	0	3	0	0	0	9	0
Ferencváros	Total		20	0	10	0	2	0	32	0
Career total			67	17	10	0	2	0	79	17

Updated to games played as of 16 December 2018.
