= Lukács Bőle =

Hungarian footballer

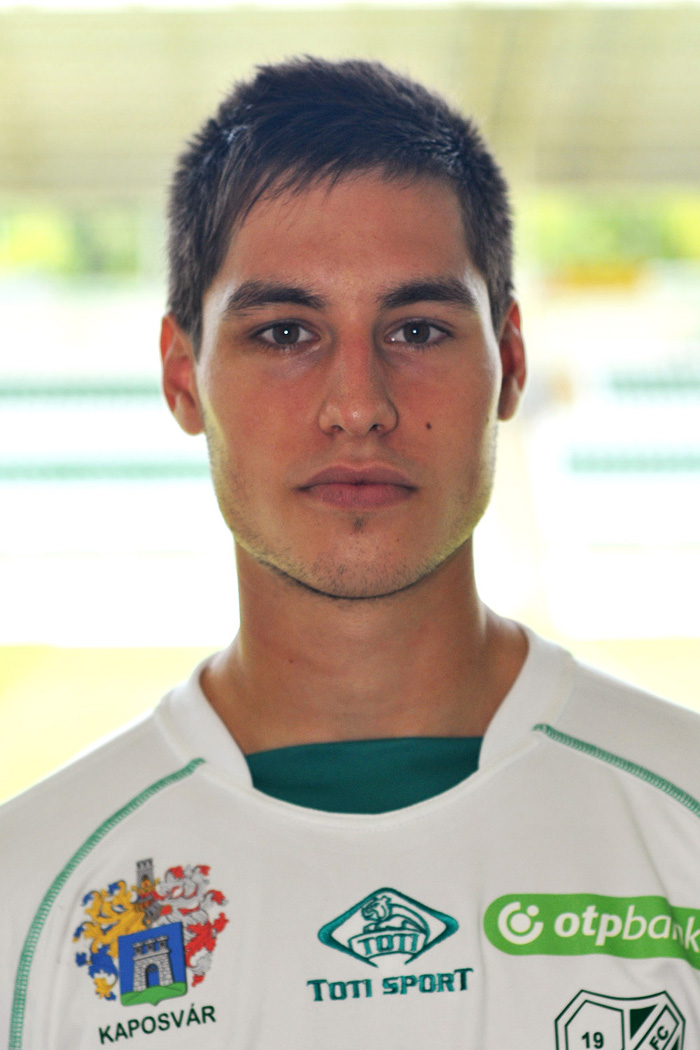
- Bőle during his time at Kaposvár

Personal information
- Date of birth: 27 March 1990 (age 36)
- Place of birth: Marcali, Hungary
- Height: 1.72 m (5 ft 7 1/2 in)
- Position: Winger

Team information
- Current team: Mezőkövesd
- Number: 21

Youth career
- 2000–2003: Marcali
- 2003–2004: MTK
- 2004–2009: Kaposvár

Senior career*
Years	Team	Apps	(Gls)
2009–2014	Kaposvár	52	(1)
2014–2017	Politehnica Iași	83	(14)
2017–2020	Ferencváros	37	(5)
2020	→ Zalaegerszeg (loan)	11	(3)
2021–2022	Budapest Honvéd	33	(5)
2022–2023	Paks	33	(4)
2024	Mezőkövesd	11	(1)
2024–	Szentlőrinc	15	(1)
- * Club domestic league appearances and goals as of 10 June 2025

Lukács Bőle (born 27 March 1990) is a Hungarian professional footballer who plays as a left winger for Szentlőrinc.

== Club career ==
=== Politehnica Iași ===
After playing all his career for Kaposvár, Bőle moved to Romanian club Politehnica Iași. On 26 June 2014 he signed a one-year contract with the Liga I club. On 7 April 2015 Lukács scored a very important goal against Dinamo București to help his team to a 1–0 victory.

=== Ferencváros ===
On 12 June 2017, Bőle was signed by Nemzeti Bajnokság I club, Ferencvárosi TC. The duration of the contract was not revealed by the club, although it turned out that Ferencváros signed Bőle for free since his contract expired with Politehnica Iași.

On 16 June 2020, he became champion with Ferencváros by beating Budapest Honvéd FC at the Hidegkuti Nándor Stadion on the 30th match day of the 2019–20 Nemzeti Bajnokság I season.

== Career statistics ==
=== Club ===
As of 15 May 2022

Appearances and goals by club, season and competition
Club	Season	League			Cup		League Cup		Europe		Total	
Club	Season	Division	Apps	Goals	Apps	Goals	Apps	Goals	Apps	Goals	Apps	Goals
Kaposvár
Kaposvár	2008–09	Nemzeti Bajnokság I	0	0	2	0	0	0	–		2	0
Kaposvár	2009–10	Nemzeti Bajnokság I	9	0	0	0	10	0	–		19	0
Kaposvár	2010–11	Nemzeti Bajnokság I	2	0	1	0	2	0	–		5	0
Kaposvár	2011–12	Nemzeti Bajnokság I	9	1	4	1	6	0	–		19	2
Kaposvár	2012–13	Nemzeti Bajnokság I	8	0	1	0	4	1	–		13	1
Kaposvár	2013–14	Nemzeti Bajnokság I	24	0	0	0	5	0	–		29	0
Kaposvár	Total		52	1	8	1	27	1	–		87	3
Politehnica Iași
Politehnica Iași	2014–15	Liga I	19	3	2	0	0	0	0	0	21	3
Politehnica Iași	2015–16	Liga I	32	2	1	0	0	0	0	0	33	2
Politehnica Iași	2016–17	Liga I	32	9	1	0	1	0	2	0	36	9
Politehnica Iași	Total		83	14	4	0	1	0	2	0	90	14
Ferencváros
Ferencváros	2017–18	Nemzeti Bajnokság I	6	1	0	0	—		4	0	10	1
Ferencváros	2018–19	Nemzeti Bajnokság I	25	3	2	0	—		2	0	29	3
Ferencváros	2019–20	Nemzeti Bajnokság I	6	1	2	1	—		2	0	10	2
Ferencváros	Total		37	5	4	1	—		8	0	49	6
Zalaegerszeg	2019–20	Nemzeti Bajnokság I	11	3	1	0	—		—		12	3
Budapest Honvéd
Budapest Honvéd	2020–21	Nemzeti Bajnokság I	11	1	1	1	—		0	0	12	2
Budapest Honvéd	2021–22	Nemzeti Bajnokság I	22	4	3	0	—		0	0	25	4
Budapest Honvéd	Total		33	5	4	1	—		—		37	6
Career total			216	28	21	3	28	1	10	0	275	32

== Honours ==
Ferencváros

- Nemzeti Bajnokság I: 2018–19
