= Roland Varga =

Hungarian footballer

Personal information
- Full name: Roland Varga
- Date of birth: 23 January 1990 (age 36)
- Place of birth: Budapest, Hungary
- Height: 1.83 m (6 ft 0 in)
- Position: Forward

Team information
- Current team: Videoton FC
- Number: 97

Youth career
- –2003: Goldball '94
- 2005–2008: MTK Budapest
- 2008–2009: Brescia

Senior career*
Years	Team	Apps	(Gls)
2009–2012	Brescia	1	(0)
2010	→ Újpest (loan)	12	(1)
2010–2011	→ Foggia (loan)	21	(2)
2012–2015	Győr	75	(20)
2015–2021	Ferencváros	143	(48)
2021	MTK Budapest	17	(9)
2021–2022	Ittihad Kalba	9	(0)
2022	Bruk-Bet Termalica	4	(0)
2022–2024	Sepsi OSK	42	(1)
2024–2025	Paks	0	(0)
2025–	Videoton	23	(7)

International career
2008–2009	Hungary U19	3	(0)
2009	Hungary U20	5	(0)
2009–2012	Hungary U21	4	(0)
2014–2021	Hungary	24	(3)
- * Club domestic league appearances and goals as of 31 May 2026

Roland Varga (born 23 January 1990) is a Hungarian professional footballer who plays as a forward for Nemzeti Bajnokság II club Videoton FC.

== Club career ==
=== Győr ===
Varga was born in Budapest, Hungary. On 19 January 2012, he signed a three-and-a-half-year contract with the Hungarian League club Győr.

=== Ferencváros ===
On 15 January 2015, Varga joined Hungarian League club Ferencváros.

=== Videoton ===
On 8 July 2025, Varga joined Hungarian League II club Videoton FC.

== International career ==
Varga played for Hungary at the 2009 FIFA U-20 World Cup finals in Egypt.

On 22 May 2014, Varga played his first match in the Hungary national team, and he scored the second Hungarian goal against Denmark national football team in a friendly match at the Nagyerdei Stadion in Debrecen.

On 1 June 2021, Varga was included in the final 26-man squad to represent Hungary at the rescheduled UEFA Euro 2020 tournament.

== Career statistics ==
=== Club ===
As of match played 18 May 2024

Appearances and goals by club, season and competition
Club	Season	League			Cup		League Cup		Europe		Total	
Club	Season	Division	Apps	Goals	Apps	Goals	Apps	Goals	Apps	Goals	Apps	Goals
Brescia	2009–10	Serie B	1	0	0	0	—		—		1	0
Újpest (loan)	2009–10	Nemzeti Bajnokság I	12	1	1	0	3	1	—		16	2
Foggia (loan)	2010–11	Lega Pro Prima Divisione	21	2	0	0	-	-	—		21	2
Győr	2011–12	Nemzeti Bajnokság I	9	3	1	0	0	0	—		10	3
Győr	2012–13	Nemzeti Bajnokság I	27	12	4	0	2	0	—		33	12
Győr	2013–14	Nemzeti Bajnokság I	28	4	5 (Note: Four appearances in Magyar Kupa and one goal, one appearance in Szuperkupa)	1	5	3	2	0	40	8
Győr	2014–15	Nemzeti Bajnokság I	11	1	1	0	0	0	2	0	14	1
Győr	Total		75	20	11	1	7	3	4	0	97	24
Ferencváros	2014–15	Nemzeti Bajnokság I	13	3	4	2	1	0	0	0	18	5
Ferencváros	2015–16	Nemzeti Bajnokság I	30	7	6 (Note: Five appearances in Magyar Kupa and one goal, one appearance in Szuperkupa and one goal)	2	—		4	0	40	9
Ferencváros	2016–17	Nemzeti Bajnokság I	17	3	6	2	—		1	0	24	5
Ferencváros	2017–18	Nemzeti Bajnokság I	30	17	0	0	—		3	3	33	20
Ferencváros	2018–19	Nemzeti Bajnokság I	28	12	3	0	—		2	0	33	12
Ferencváros	2019–20	Nemzeti Bajnokság I	21	6	3	0	—		10	2	34	8
Ferencváros	2020–21	Nemzeti Bajnokság I	4	0	1	1	—		1	0	6	1
Ferencváros	Total		143	48	23	7	1	0	21	5	188	60
MTK Budapest	2020–21	Nemzeti Bajnokság I	17	9	3	2	—		0	0	20	11
Ittihad Kalba	2021–22	UAE Pro League	9	0	—		3	0	—		12	0
Bruk-Bet Termalica	2021–22	Ekstraklasa	4	0	—		—		—		4	0
Sepsi OSK	2022–23	Liga I	12	0	4	2	—		—		16	2
Sepsi OSK	2023–24	Liga I	30	1	2	0	—		6	4	38	5
Sepsi OSK	Total		42	1	6	2	–	–	6	4	54	7
Paks	2024–25	Nemzeti Bajnokság I	0	0	0	0	—		—		0	0
Videoton	2025–26	Nemzeti Bajnokság II	0	0	0	0	—		—		0	0
Career total			324	81	44	12	14	4	31	9	413	106

=== International stats ===
As of match played 5 September 2021.

Appearances and goals by national team and year
National team	Year	Apps	Goals
Hungary	2014	3	2
Hungary	2015	1	0
Hungary	2016	0	0
Hungary	2017	3	0
Hungary	2018	6	1
Hungary	2019	6	0
Hungary	2020	0	0
Hungary	2021	5	0
Total		24	3

=== International goals ===
As of match played on 15 June 2021
Scores and results list Hungary's goal tally first, score column indicates score after each Varga goal.

List of international goals scored by Roland Varga
No.	Date	Venue	Opponent	Score	Result	Competition
1	22 May 2014	Nagyerdei Stadion, Debrecen, Hungary	Denmark	2–1	2–2	Friendly
2	7 June 2014	Puskás Ferenc Stadion, Budapest, Hungary	Kazakhstan	2–0	3–0	Friendly
3	6 June 2018	Regional Sport Complex Brestsky, Brest, Belarus	Belarus	1–1	1–1	Friendly

== Honours ==
Győr

- Nemzeti Bajnokság I: 2012–13
- Magyar Kupa runner-up: 2012–13
- Szuperkupa: 2013

Ferencváros

- Nemzeti Bajnokság I: 2015–16, 2018–19, 2019–20, 2020–21
- Magyar Kupa: 2014–15, 2015–16, 2016–17
- Ligakupa: 2014–15
- Szuperkupa: 2015, 2016

Sepsi OSK

- Cupa României: 2022–23
- Supercupa României: 2023

Hungary U20

- FIFA U-20 World Cup third place: 2009
