= 2017–18 Ferencvárosi TC season =

Ferencvárosi TC
2017–18 season
- Chairman: Gábor Kubatov
- Manager: Thomas Doll
- NB 1: 2nd
- Hungarian Cup: Second round
- UEFA Europa League: Second qualifying round
- Top goalscorer: League: Roland Varga (17); All: Roland Varga (20)
- Highest home attendance: 19,125 v Debrecen (4 November 2017)
- Lowest home attendance: 4,911 v Haladás (17 August 2017)
Home colours	Away colours

The 2017–18 season was Ferencvárosi TC's 115th competitive season, 9th consecutive season in the OTP Bank Liga and 118th year in existence as a football club.

== Players ==
=== First team squad ===
As of 2 September 2017.

Note: Flags indicate national team as defined under FIFA eligibility rules; some limited exceptions apply. Players may hold more than one non-FIFA nationality.

No.	Pos.	Nation	Player
3	FW	HUN	Norbert Kundrák
4	MF	MKD	Stefan Spirovski
5	DF	BRA	Marquinhos Pedroso
7	DF	HUN	Bence Batik
8	FW	HUN	Gergő Lovrencsics
11	MF	HUN	István Bognár
13	FW	HUN	Dániel Böde (captain)
15	MF	HUN	Tamás Hajnal
16	DF	HUN	Leandro
17	MF	HUN	Kornél Csernik
19	MF	GER	Julian Koch
20	MF	HUN	Zoltán Gera (2nd Captain)
21	DF	HUN	Endre Botka
22	DF	HUN	Kenny Otigba

No.	Pos.	Nation	Player
23	MF	HUN	Lukács Bőle
25	DF	SVN	Miha Blazic
27	MF	URU	Fernando Gorriarán
28	MF	GHA	Joseph Paintsil
29	FW	HUN	Tamás Priskin
30	MF	POR	Rui Pedro
31	GK	HUN	Ádám Holczer
37	DF	GER	Janek Sternberg
40	MF	NIG	Amadou Moutari
42	GK	HUN	Ádám Varga
51	MF	HUN	András Csonka
90	GK	HUN	Dénes Dibusz
91	FW	HUN	Balázs Lovrencsics
97	FW	HUN	Roland Varga

==== Out on loan ====
Note: Flags indicate national team as defined under FIFA eligibility rules; some limited exceptions apply. Players may hold more than one non-FIFA nationality.

No.	Pos.	Nation	Player
—	DF	HUN	Dávid Valencsik (at Soroksár)
—	DF	HUN	Erik Silye (at Soroksár)

No.	Pos.	Nation	Player
67	FW	HUN	István Lakatos (at Soroksár)

== Transfers ==
=== Summer ===
In: Note: Flags indicate national team as defined under FIFA eligibility rules; some limited exceptions apply. Players may hold more than one non-FIFA nationality.

No.	Pos.	Nation	Player
5	DF	BRA	Marquinhos Pedroso (loan from (Brazil) Figueirense)
22	MF	HUN	Kenny Otigba (from (Netherlands) Heerenveen)
23	MF	HUN	Lukács Bőle (from (Romania) Politehnica Iași)
25	DF	SVN	Miha Blažič (from (Slovenia) Domžale)
27	MF	URU	Fernando Gorriarán (from (Uruguay) River Plate)
28	MF	GHA	Joseph Paintsil (from (Ghana) Tema Youth)
29	FW	HUN	Tamás Priskin (from (Slovakia) Slovan Bratislava)
30	MF	POR	Rui Pedro (from (Bulgaria) CSKA Sofia)
91	FW	HUN	Balázs Lovrencsics (loan return from Soroksár)

Out: Note: Flags indicate national team as defined under FIFA eligibility rules; some limited exceptions apply. Players may hold more than one non-FIFA nationality.

No.	Pos.	Nation	Player
5	DF	GER	Oliver Hüsing (to (Germany) Rostock)
6	MF	HUN	László Kleinheisler (loan return to (Germany) Bremen)
10	FW	HUN	András Radó (to Puskás)
16	MF	HUN	Tamás Csilus (to Nyíregyháza)
18	MF	KOR	Ryu Seung-woo (loan return to (Germany) Leverkusen)
23	FW	AUT	Marco Djuricin (loan return to (Austria) Salzburg)
27	DF	POL	Michał Nalepa (to (Poland) Lechia Gdańsk)
30	MF	SRB	Vladan Cukic (retired)
35	FW	GER	Florian Trinks (to (Germany) Chemnitzer FC)
55	GK	HUN	Levente Jova (to Nyíregyháza)
66	DF	AUT	Emir Dilaver (to (Poland) Lech Poznań)
95	MF	HUN	Attila Haris (to Balmazújváros)

=== Winter ===
In: Note: Flags indicate national team as defined under FIFA eligibility rules; some limited exceptions apply. Players may hold more than one non-FIFA nationality.

No.	Pos.	Nation	Player
11	FW	SRB	Dejan Georgijević (from (Serbia) Voždovac)
14	MF	HUN	Dominik Nagy (loan from (Poland) Legia Warsaw)

Out: Note: Flags indicate national team as defined under FIFA eligibility rules; some limited exceptions apply. Players may hold more than one non-FIFA nationality.

No.	Pos.	Nation	Player
3	MF	HUN	Norbert Kundrák (loan to Soroksár)
11	MF	HUN	István Bognár (to Mezőkövesd)
17	MF	HUN	Kornél Csernik (loan to Soroksár)

== Statistics ==
=== Appearances and goals ===
Last updated on 2 June 2018.

No.	Pos	Nat	Player	Total		OTP Bank Liga		Europa League		Hungarian Cup	
No.	Pos	Nat	Player	Apps	Goals	Apps	Goals	Apps	Goals	Apps	Goals
4	MF	(North Macedonia) MKD	Stefan Spirovski	27	2	25	2	0	0	2	0
5	DF	(Brazil) BRA	Marquinhos Pedroso	25	0	23	0	0	0	2	0
7	DF	(Hungary) HUN	Bence Batik	16	0	13	0	2	0	1	0
8	MF	(Hungary) HUN	Gergő Lovrencsics	34	1	29	1	4	0	1	0
11	FW	(Serbia) SRB	Dejan Georgijević	7	1	7	1	0	0	0	0
13	FW	(Hungary) HUN	Dániel Böde	31	13	30	13	0	0	1	0
14	MF	(Hungary) HUN	Dominik Nagy	13	0	13	0	0	0	0	0
15	MF	(Hungary) HUN	Tamás Hajnal	5	1	4	1	1	0	0	0
16	DF	(Hungary) HUN	Leandro	30	2	25	1	3	0	2	1
19	MF	(Germany) GER	Julian Koch	12	0	9	0	3	0	0	0
20	MF	(Hungary) HUN	Zoltán Gera	8	0	4	0	4	0	0	0
21	DF	(Hungary) HUN	Endre Botka	33	2	28	0	3	1	2	1
22	DF	(Hungary) HUN	Kenny Otigba	26	1	24	1	1	0	1	0
23	MF	(Hungary) HUN	Lukács Bőle	10	1	6	1	4	0	0	0
25	DF	(Slovenia) SVN	Miha Blažič	26	7	24	7	0	0	2	0
27	MF	(Uruguay) URU	Fernando Gorriarán	33	2	28	2	4	0	1	0
28	MF	(Ghana) GHA	Joseph Paintsil	27	10	25	10	0	0	2	0
29	FW	(Hungary) HUN	Tamás Priskin	22	5	17	4	4	1	1	0
30	MF	(Portugal) POR	Rui Pedro	11	1	8	0	3	1	0	0
31	GK	(Hungary) HUN	Ádám Holczer	2	-4	1	-3	0	0	1	-1
37	DF	(Germany) GER	Janek Sternberg	7	0	5	0	0	0	2	0
40	FW	(Niger) NIG	Amadou Moutari	32	5	26	5	4	0	2	0
51	MF	(Hungary) HUN	András Csonka	2	0	1	0	1	0	0	0
90	GK	(Hungary) HUN	Dénes Dibusz	37	-36	32	-28	4	-7	1	-1
91	FW	(Hungary) HUN	Balázs Lovrencsics	18	1	15	1	3	0	0	0
97	FW	(Hungary) HUN	Roland Varga	33	20	30	17	3	3	0	0
Out to loan:
3	FW	(Hungary) HUN	Norbert Kundrák	5	0	2	0	1	0	2	0
17	MF	(Hungary) HUN	Kornél Csernik	9	0	6	0	2	0	1	0
Players no longer at the club:
10	MF	(Hungary) HUN	András Radó	1	0	0	0	1	0	0	0
11	MF	(Hungary) HUN	István Bognár	1	0	0	0	0	0	1	0

=== Top scorers ===
Includes all competitive matches. The list is sorted by shirt number when total goals are equal.

Last updated on 2 June 2018

Position	Nation	Number	Name	OTP Bank Liga	Europa League	Hungarian Cup	Total
1	(Hungary)	97	Roland Varga	17	3	0	20
2	(Hungary)	13	Dániel Böde	13	0	0	13
3	(Ghana)	28	Joseph Paintsil	10	0	0	10
4	(Slovenia)	25	Miha Blažič	7	0	0	7
5	(Hungary)	29	Tamás Priskin	4	1	0	5
6	(Niger)	40	Amadou Moutari	5	0	0	5
7	(North Macedonia)	4	Stefan Spirovski	2	0	0	2
8	(Uruguay)	27	Fernando Gorriarán	2	0	0	2
9	(Hungary)	21	Endre Botka	0	1	1	2
10	(Hungary)	16	Leandro	1	0	1	2
11	(Portugal)	30	Rui Pedro	0	1	0	1
12	(Hungary)	8	Gergő Lovrencsics	1	0	0	1
13	(Hungary)	91	Balázs Lovrencsics	1	0	0	1
14	(Hungary)	22	Kenny Otigba	1	0	0	1
15	(Serbia)	11	Dejan Georgijević	1	0	0	1
16	(Hungary)	15	Tamás Hajnal	1	0	0	1
17	(Hungary)	23	Lukács Bőle	1	0	0	1
/	/	/	Own Goals	2	0	0	2
			TOTALS	69	6	2	77

=== Disciplinary record ===
Includes all competitive matches. Players with 1 card or more included only.

Last updated on 2 June 2018

Position	Nation	Number	Name	OTP Bank Liga		Europa League		Hungarian Cup		Total (Hu Total)	
Position	Nation	Number	Name	Booked	Sent off (straight red)	Booked	Sent off (straight red)	Booked	Sent off (straight red)	Booked	Sent off (straight red)
MF	(North Macedonia)	4	Stefan Spirovski	4	0	0	0	0	0	4 (4)	0 (0)
DF	(Brazil)	5	Marquinhos Pedroso	4	0	0	0	1	0	5 (4)	0 (0)
DF	(Hungary)	7	Bence Batik	4	0	1	0	0	0	5 (4)	0 (0)
FW	(Hungary)	8	Gergő Lovrencsics	4	0	0	0	0	0	4 (4)	0 (0)
FW	(Serbia)	11	Dejan Georgijević	1	0	0	0	0	0	1 (1)	0 (0)
FW	(Hungary)	13	Dániel Böde	4	0	0	0	1	0	5 (4)	0 (0)
MF	(Hungary)	14	Dominik Nagy	2	0	0	0	0	0	2 (2)	0 (0)
MF	(Hungary)	15	Tamás Hajnal	2	0	0	0	0	0	2 (2)	0 (0)
DF	(Hungary)	16	Leandro	10	0	2	0	0	0	12 (10)	0 (0)
MF	(Hungary)	17	Kornél Csernik	0	0	1	0	1	0	2 (0)	0 (0)
DF	(Germany)	19	Julian Koch	2	0	0	1	0	0	2 (2)	1 (0)
DF	(Hungary)	21	Endre Botka	5	1	3	0	0	0	8 (5)	1 (1)
DF	(Hungary)	22	Kenny Otigba	7	0	0	0	1	0	8 (7)	0 (0)
MF	(Hungary)	23	Lukács Bőle	1	0	0	0	0	0	1 (1)	0 (0)
MF	(Slovenia)	25	Miha Blažič	3	0	0	0	0	0	3 (3)	0 (0)
MF	(Uruguay)	27	Fernando Gorriarán	5	1	0	0	0	0	5 (5)	1 (1)
MF	(Ghana)	28	Joseph Paintsil	3	1	0	0	1	0	4 (3)	1 (1)
FW	(Hungary)	29	Tamás Priskin	0	1	1	0	0	0	1 (0)	1 (1)
MF	(Portugal)	30	Rui Pedro	1	0	0	0	0	0	1 (1)	0 (0)
GK	(Hungary)	31	Ádám Holczer	1	0	0	0	0	0	1 (1)	0 (0)
FW	(Niger)	40	Amadou Moutari	1	0	2	0	0	0	3 (1)	0 (0)
GK	(Hungary)	90	Dénes Dibusz	2	0	0	0	0	0	2 (2)	0 (0)
FW	(Hungary)	91	Balázs Lovrencsics	1	0	0	0	0	0	1 (1)	0 (0)
FW	(Hungary)	97	Roland Varga	0	0	1	0	0	0	1 (0)	0 (0)
			TOTALS	67	4	11	1	5	0	83 (67)	5 (4)

=== Overall ===
Games played	39 (33 OTP Bank Liga, 4 Europa League and 2 Hungarian Cup)
Games won	21 (18 OTP Bank Liga, 2 Europa League and 1 Hungarian Cup)
Games drawn	11 (11 OTP Bank Liga, 0 Europa League and 0 Hungarian Cup)
Games lost	6 (3 OTP Bank Liga, 2 Europa League and 1 Hungarian Cup)
Goals scored	77
Goals conceded	40
Goal difference	+37
Yellow cards	83
Red cards	5
Worst discipline	(Hungary) Leandro (12 (yellow card) , 0 (red card) )
Best result	5–0 (H) v Mezőkövesd - OTP Bank Liga - 30-07-2017
Best result	5–0 (H) v Balmazújváros - OTP Bank Liga - 10-03-2017
Worst result	2–4 (H) v Midtjylland - Europa League - 13-07-2017
Worst result	1–3 (A) v Midtjylland - Europa League - 20-07-2017
Worst result	1–3 (A) v Videoton - OTP Bank Liga - 27-08-2017
Most appearances	(Hungary) Dénes Dibusz (37 appearances)
Top scorer	(Hungary) Roland Varga (20 goals)
Points	75/117 (64.1%)

Last updated: 2 June 2018

== Nemzeti Bajnokság I ==
=== Matches ===
16 July 2017 1	Ferencváros	1 – 1	Puskás Akadémia	Budapest, Pest County
17:00 CEST	Varga 42'	Report	Szakály 24'	Stadium: Groupama Arena; Attendance: 6,087; Referee: (Hungary) Sándor Andó-Szabó

23 July 2017 2	Újpest	2 – 2	Ferencváros	Budapest, Pest County
18:00 CEST	Novothny 27'; Nagy 63'	Report	Priskin 36'; Varga 90'	Stadium: Szusza Ferenc Stadium; Attendance: 6,567; Referee: (Hungary) Zoltán Iványi

30 July 2017 3	Ferencváros	5 – 0	Mezőkövesd	Budapest, Pest County
18:00 CEST	Moutari 9', 26'; Varga 29' (pen.), 53'; Böde 90'	Report		Stadium: Groupama Arena; Attendance: 5,861; Referee: (Hungary) Péter Solymosi

6 August 2017 4	Debrecen	0 – 0	Ferencváros	Debrecen, Hajdú-Bihar County
18:00 CEST		Report		Stadium: Nagyerdei Stadion; Attendance: 5,306; Referee: (Hungary) Zsolt Szabó

12 August 2017 5	Ferencváros	1 – 1	Paks	Budapest, Pest County
18:00 CEST	Varga 41'	Report	Hahn 60'	Stadium: Groupama Arena; Attendance: 5,423; Referee: (Hungary) József Erdős

17 August 2017 6	Ferencváros	2 – 0	Szombathely	Budapest, Pest County
18:00 CEST	Moutari 5'; Böde 82'	Report		Stadium: Groupama Arena; Attendance: 4,911; Referee: (Hungary) Ferenc Karakó

27 August 2017 7	Videoton	3 – 1	Ferencváros	Felcsút, Fejér County
19:30 CET	Pátkai 12'; Šćepović 48'; Stopira 83'	Report	Priskin 89'	Stadium: Pancho Aréna; Attendance: 2,862; Referee: (Hungary) Péter Solymosi

9 September 2017 8	Ferencváros	5 – 2	Vasas	Budapest, Pest County
18:00 CEST	Paintsil 32'; Varga 62' 81' 90+3' (pen.); Priskin 84'	Report	Kulcsár 14'; Gaál 60'	Stadium: Groupama Arena; Attendance: 7,135; Referee: (Hungary) Tamás Bognár

16 September 2017 9	Budapest Honvéd	1 – 3	Ferencváros	Budapest, Pest County
20:30 CEST	Lanzafame 33' (pen.)	Report	Varga 6', 48'; Paintsil 68'	Stadium: Bozsik Stadion; Attendance: 4,423; Referee: (Hungary) Ádám Farkas

23 August 2017 10	Ferencváros	2 – 0	Diósgyőr	Budapest, Pest County
18:00 CEST	Varga 63'; Spirovski 74'	Report		Stadium: Groupama Arena; Attendance: 9,195; Referee: (Hungary) Zsolt Szabó

30 September 2017 11	Balmazújváros	2 – 3	Ferencváros	Balmazújváros, Hajdú-Bihar County
18:00 CEST	Vayda 10'; Sigér 36'	Report	Lovrencsics 39'; Paintsil 55'; Varga 78' (pen.)	Stadium: Városi Sportpálya; Attendance: 2,200; Referee: (Hungary) Zoltán Iványi

14 October 2017 12	Puskás Akadémia	1 – 1	Ferencváros	Felcsút, Fejér County
19:30 CEST	Knežević 86' (pen.)	Report	Paintsil 39'	Stadium: Pancho Aréna; Attendance: 3,127; Referee: (Hungary) Tamás Bognár

21 October 2017 13	Ferencváros	1 – 0	Újpest	Budapest, Pest County
15:30 CEST	Böde 81'	Report		Stadium: Groupama Arena; Attendance: 14,752; Referee: (Hungary) Zoltan Ivanyi

28 October 2017 14	Mezőkövesd	0 – 1	Ferencváros	Mezőkövesd, Borsod-Abaúj-Zemplén County
15:30 CEST		Report	Böde 39'	Stadium: Mezőkövesdi Városi Stadion; Attendance: 2,935; Referee: (Hungary) Csaba Pinter

4 November 2017 15	Ferencváros	2 – 1	Debrecen	Budapest, Pest County
15:30 CET	Varga 58'; Priskin 60'	Report	Jovanović 84'	Stadium: Groupama Arena; Attendance: 19,125; Referee: (Hungary) Sándor Andó-Szabó

18 November 2017 16	Paks	0 – 2	Ferencváros	Paks, Tolna County
15:30 CET		Report	Paintsil 5'; Moutari 90+3'	Stadium: Fehérvári úti Stadion; Attendance: 1,643; Referee: (Hungary) Balazs Berke

25 November 2017 17	Szombathely	2 – 1	Ferencváros	Szombathely, Vas County
19:30 CET	Mészáros 32'; Kiss 84'	Report	Blažič 34'	Stadium: Haladás Sportkomplexum; Attendance: 8,028; Referee: (Hungary) Zsolt Szabó

2 December 2017 18	Ferencváros	3 – 1	Videoton	Budapest, Pest County
19:30 CET	Spirovski 34'; Paintsil 44'; Moutari 82'	Report	Lazović 74'	Stadium: Groupama Arena; Attendance: 9,384; Referee: (Hungary) Zoltan Ivanyi

9 December 2017 19	Vasas	0 – 2	Ferencváros	Budapest, Pest County
19:30 CET		Report	Lovrencsics 2'; Gorriarán 90+3'	Stadium: Szusza Ferenc Stadion; Attendance: 1,800; Referee: (Hungary) Csaba Pintér

24 February 2018 20	Ferencváros	5 – 2	Budapest Honvéd	Budapest, Pest County
19:30 CET	Gorriarán 24'; Böde 33', 83'; Blažič 45'; Leandro 90+1'	Report	Eppel 20', 60'	Stadium: Groupama Arena; Attendance: 7,225; Referee: (Hungary) Zoltán Iványi

3 March 2018 21	Diósgyőr	2 – 1	Ferencváros	Debrecen, Hajdú-Bihar County
17:00 CET	Brković 56'; Botka 59' (o.g.)	Report	Böde 9'	Stadium: Nagyerdei Stadion; Attendance: 3,652; Referee: (Hungary) Ádám Farkas

10 March 2018 22	Ferencváros	5 – 0	Balmazújváros	Budapest, Pest County
17:00 CET	Paintsil 13'; Varga 47' (pen.); Böde 55', 64', 90+2'	Report		Stadium: Groupama Arena; Attendance: 6,565; Referee: (Hungary) Tamás Bognár

17 March 2018 23	Ferencváros	3 – 1	Puskás Akadémia	Budapest, Pest County
19:30 CET	Otigba 41'; Blažič 90'; Böde 90+3'	Report	Henty 25'	Stadium: Groupama Arena; Attendance: 8,411; Referee: (Hungary) Csaba Pintér

31 March 2018 24	Újpest	0 – 0	Ferencváros	Budapest, Pest County
17:00 CEST		Report		Stadium: Szusza Ferenc Stadium; Attendance: 9,596; Referee: (Hungary) Zoltán Iványi

7 April 2018 25	Ferencváros	3 – 0	Mezőkövesd	Budapest, Pest County
14:30 CEST	Böde 32'; Varga 50'; Georgijević 88'	Report		Stadium: Groupama Arena; Attendance: 8,375; Referee: (Hungary) Péter Solymosi

14 April 2018 26	Debrecen	1 – 1	Ferencváros	Debrecen, Hajdú-Bihar County
19:30 CEST	Könyves 37'	Report	Varga 8'	Stadium: Nagyerdei Stadion; Attendance: 10,841; Referee: (Hungary) Zoltán Iványi

21 April 2018 27	Ferencváros	2 – 2	Paks	Budapest, Pest County
17:00 CEST	Blažič 47'; Varga 90+4' (pen.)	Report	Gévay 33'; Papp 57'	Stadium: Groupama Arena; Attendance: 10,112; Referee: (Hungary) Sándor Andó-Szabó

28 April 2018 28	Ferencváros	2 – 1	Szombathely	Budapest, Pest County
19:30 CEST	Paintsil 38'; Blažič 47'	Report	Williams 7'	Stadium: Groupama Arena; Attendance: 7,872; Referee: (Hungary) Gergely Szőts

5 May 2018 29	Videoton	0 – 0	Ferencváros	Felcsút, Fejér County
19:30 CET		Report		Stadium: Pancho Aréna; Attendance: 3,474; Referee: (Hungary) Tamás Bognár

12 May 2018 30	Ferencváros	1 – 1	Vasas	Budapest, Pest County
19:30 CEST	Blažič 89'	Report	Egerszegi 90+4'	Stadium: Groupama Arena; Attendance: 11,345; Referee: (Hungary) Sándor Andó-Szabó

19 May 2018 31	Budapest Honvéd	1 – 1	Ferencváros	Budapest, Pest County
19:30 CEST	Lanzafame 69' (pen.)	Report	Blažič 49'	Stadium: Bozsik Stadion; Attendance: 4,680; Referee: (Hungary) Ádám Farkas

27 May 2018 32	Ferencváros	4 – 0	Diósgyőr	Budapest, Pest County
17:30 CEST	Böde 9'; Paintsil 20', 90+4' (pen.); Hajnal 86'	Report		Stadium: Groupama Arena; Attendance: 12,980; Referee: (Hungary) Balázs Berke

2 June 2018 33	Balmazújváros	3 – 3	Ferencváros	Balmazújváros, Hajdú-Bihar County
19:00 CEST	Batarelo 19'; Arabuli 28'; Tamás 70'	Report	Tamás 14' (o.g.); Bőle 16'; Uzoma 44' (o.g.)	Stadium: Városi Sportpálya; Attendance: 2,291; Referee: (Hungary) Gergely Szőts

=== League table ===
Pos	Team	Pld	W	D	L	GF	GA	GD	Pts	Qualification or relegation
1	Videoton (C)	33	20	8	5	65	28	+37	68	Qualification for the Champions League first qualifying round
2	Ferencváros	33	18	12	3	69	31	+38	66	Qualification for the Europa League first qualifying round (Note: Since the winners of the 2017–18 Magyar Kupa, Újpest, qualified for European competition based on league position, the spot awarded to the cup winners (Europa League first qualifying round) was passed to the fourth-placed team.)
3	Újpest	33	12	13	8	41	38	+3	49	Qualification for the Europa League first qualifying round
4	Honvéd	33	13	8	12	50	53	−3	47	Qualification for the Europa League first qualifying round
5	Debrecen	33	12	8	13	53	47	+6	44	

Source: Hungarian Football Federation (in Hungarian), Soccerway
Rules for classification: 1) Points; 2) Matches won; 3) Goal difference; 4) Goals scored; 5) Head-to-head points; 6) Head-to-head goal difference; 7) Head-to-head away goals scored; 8) Fair play ranking; 9) Drawing of lots.
(C) Champions

=== Results summary ===
Overall								Home						Away					
Pld	W	D	L	GF	GA	GD	Pts	W	D	L	GF	GA	GD	W	D	L	GF	GA	GD
33	18	12	3	69	31	+38	66	13	4	0	47	13	+34	5	8	3	22	18	+4

Last updated: 2 June 2018.
Source: NB1

=== Results by round ===
Round	1	2	3	4	5	6	7	8	9	10	11	12	13	14	15	16	17	18	19	20	21	22	23	24	25	26	27	28	29	30	31	32	33
Ground	H	A	H	A	H	H	A	H	A	H	A	A	H	A	H	A	A	H	A	H	A	H	H	A	H	A	H	H	A	H	A	H	A
Result	D	D	W	D	D	W	L	W	W	W	W	D	W	W	W	W	L	W	W	W	L	W	W	D	W	D	D	W	D	D	D	W	D
Position	7	8	4	6	6	3	3	2	1	1	1	1	1	1	2	2	2	2	1	1	2	1	1	1	1	1	2	1	1	2	2	2	2

Updated to match(es) played on 2 June 2018. Source: Matches
A = Away; H = Home; W = Win; D = Draw; L = Loss

=== Magyar Kupa ===
19 September 2017 Round 1	Dunaharaszti	1 – 2	Ferencváros	Dunaharaszti, Pest County
15:00 CEST	Mészáros 86'	Report	Botka 63'; Leandro 90+2'	Stadium: Dunaharaszti MTK Sporttelep; Attendance: 800; Referee: (Hungary) Róbert Nagy

24 October 2017 Round 2	Kisvárda	1 – 0	Ferencváros	Kisvárda, Szabolcs-Szatmár-Bereg County
13:30 CEST	Horváth 37'	Report		Stadium: Várkert Sportpálya; Attendance: 3,023; Referee: (Hungary) Ádám Németh

== Europa League ==
The First and Second Qualifying Round draws took place at UEFA headquarters in Nyon, Switzerland on 19 June 2017.

29 June 2017 Q1 Leg 1	Ferencváros (Hungary)	2 – 0	(Latvia) Jelgava	Budapest
18:45 CEST	Varga 10', 69'	Report		Stadium: Groupama Arena; Attendance: 7,123; Referee: (Cyprus) Vasilis Dimitriou

6 July 2017 Q1 Leg 2	Jelgava (Latvia)	0 – 1	(Hungary) Ferencváros	Jelgava
17:30 CEST		Report	Priskin 37'	Stadium: Zemgale Olympic Center; Attendance: 1,400; Referee: (Moldova) Dumitri Muntean

13 July 2017 Q2 Leg 1	Ferencváros (Hungary)	2 – 4	(Denmark) Midtjylland	Budapest
21:00 CEST	Botka 22'; Varga 42'	Report	Poulsen 45+1' (pen.), 61', 67' (pen.); Onuachu 90'	Stadium: Groupama Arena; Attendance: 8,034; Referee: (Switzerland) Sandro Schärer

20 July 2017 Q2 Leg 2	Midtjylland (Denmark)	3 – 1	(Hungary) Ferencváros	Herning
19:00 CEST	Wikheim 34'; Nissen 71'; Sørloth 81'	Report	Rui Pedro 64'	Stadium: MCH Arena; Attendance: 5,413; Referee: (Turkey) Alper Ulusoy
