= Lovrencsics =

Lovrencsics is a surname. Notable people with the surname include:

- Balázs Lovrencsics (born 1991), Hungarian footballer, brother of Gergő
- Gergő Lovrencsics (born 1988), Hungarian footballer
