= UEFA Euro 2016 squads =

List of European championship footballers

For UEFA Euro 2016, the 24 participating national teams had to submit squads of 23 players – of which three had to be goalkeepers – by 31 May 2016, 10 days prior to the opening match of the tournament. In the event that a player on the submitted squad list suffered an injury or illness prior to his team's first match of the tournament, that player could be replaced, provided that the team doctor and a doctor from the UEFA Medical Committee both confirmed that the injury or illness is severe enough to prevent the player's participation in the tournament.

The age listed for each player is on 10 June 2016, the first day of the tournament. The number of caps listed for each player does not include any matches played after the start of UEFA Euro 2016. The club listed is the club for which the player last played a competitive match prior to the tournament. The nationality for each club reflects the national association (not the league) to which the club is affiliated.

== Group A ==
=== France ===
Manager: Didier Deschamps

France announced their squad on 12 May. Raphaël Varane was initially in the squad but was replaced by Adil Rami after injury. On 28 May, Jérémy Mathieu was replaced by Samuel Umtiti due to an injury. On 31 May, Lassana Diarra was replaced by Morgan Schneiderlin because of an injury. The squad numbers were announced on 30 May.

No.	Pos.	Player	Date of birth (age)	Caps	Goals	Club
1	GK	Hugo Lloris (captain)	26 December 1986 (aged 29)	75	0	(The Football Association) Tottenham Hotspur
2	DF	Christophe Jallet	31 October 1983 (aged 32)	11	1	(French Football Federation) Lyon
3	DF	Patrice Evra	15 May 1981 (aged 35)	73	0	(Italian Football Federation) Juventus
4	DF	Adil Rami	27 December 1985 (aged 30)	28	1	(Royal Spanish Football Federation) Sevilla
5	MF	N'Golo Kanté	29 March 1991 (aged 25)	4	1	(The Football Association) Leicester City
6	MF	Yohan Cabaye	14 January 1986 (aged 30)	46	4	(The Football Association) Crystal Palace
7	FW	Antoine Griezmann	21 March 1991 (aged 25)	27	7	(Royal Spanish Football Federation) Atlético Madrid
8	MF	Dimitri Payet	29 March 1987 (aged 29)	19	3	(The Football Association) West Ham United
9	FW	Olivier Giroud	30 September 1986 (aged 29)	49	17	(The Football Association) Arsenal
10	FW	André-Pierre Gignac	5 December 1985 (aged 30)	27	7	(Mexican Football Federation) UANL
11	FW	Anthony Martial	5 December 1995 (aged 20)	9	0	(The Football Association) Manchester United
12	MF	Morgan Schneiderlin	8 November 1989 (aged 26)	15	0	(The Football Association) Manchester United
13	DF	Eliaquim Mangala	13 February 1991 (aged 25)	7	0	(The Football Association) Manchester City
14	MF	Blaise Matuidi	9 April 1987 (aged 29)	44	8	(French Football Federation) Paris Saint-Germain
15	MF	Paul Pogba	15 March 1993 (aged 23)	31	5	(Italian Football Federation) Juventus
16	GK	Steve Mandanda	28 March 1985 (aged 31)	22	0	(French Football Federation) Marseille
17	DF	Lucas Digne	20 July 1993 (aged 22)	13	0	(Italian Football Federation) Roma
18	MF	Moussa Sissoko	16 August 1989 (aged 26)	38	1	(The Football Association) Newcastle United
19	DF	Bacary Sagna	14 February 1983 (aged 33)	57	0	(The Football Association) Manchester City
20	FW	Kingsley Coman	13 June 1996 (aged 19)	5	1	(German Football Association) Bayern Munich
21	DF	Laurent Koscielny	10 September 1985 (aged 30)	29	1	(The Football Association) Arsenal
22	DF	Samuel Umtiti	14 November 1993 (aged 22)	0	0	(French Football Federation) Lyon
23	GK	Benoît Costil	3 July 1987 (aged 28)	0	0	(French Football Federation) Rennes

=== Romania ===
Manager: Anghel Iordănescu

Romania announced their final squad on 31 May.

No.	Pos.	Player	Date of birth (age)	Caps	Goals	Club
1	GK	Costel Pantilimon	1 February 1987 (aged 29)	22	0	(The Football Association) Watford
2	DF	Alexandru Mățel	17 October 1989 (aged 26)	16	0	(Croatian Football Federation) Dinamo Zagreb
3	DF	Răzvan Raț	26 May 1981 (aged 35)	111	2	(Royal Spanish Football Federation) Rayo Vallecano
4	DF	Cosmin Moți	3 December 1984 (aged 31)	8	0	(Bulgarian Football Union) Ludogorets Razgrad
5	MF	Ovidiu Hoban	27 December 1982 (aged 33)	20	1	(Israel Football Association) Hapoel Be'er Sheva
6	DF	Vlad Chiricheș (captain)	14 November 1989 (aged 26)	40	0	(Italian Football Federation) Napoli
7	MF	Alexandru Chipciu	18 May 1989 (aged 27)	21	3	(Romanian Football Federation) Steaua București
8	MF	Mihai Pintilii	9 November 1984 (aged 31)	31	1	(Romanian Football Federation) Steaua București
9	FW	Denis Alibec	5 January 1991 (aged 25)	4	1	(Romanian Football Federation) Astra Giurgiu
10	MF	Nicolae Stanciu	7 May 1993 (aged 23)	5	4	(Romanian Football Federation) Steaua București
11	MF	Gabriel Torje	22 November 1989 (aged 26)	50	11	(Turkish Football Federation) Osmanlıspor
12	GK	Ciprian Tătărușanu	9 February 1986 (aged 30)	36	0	(Italian Football Federation) Fiorentina
13	FW	Claudiu Keșerü	2 December 1986 (aged 29)	13	5	(Bulgarian Football Union) Ludogorets Razgrad
14	FW	Florin Andone	11 April 1993 (aged 23)	6	1	(Royal Spanish Football Federation) Córdoba
15	DF	Valerică Găman	25 February 1989 (aged 27)	13	1	(Romanian Football Federation) Astra Giurgiu
16	DF	Steliano Filip	15 May 1994 (aged 22)	4	0	(Romanian Football Federation) Dinamo București
17	MF	Lucian Sânmărtean	13 March 1980 (aged 36)	20	0	(Saudi Arabian Football Federation) Al-Ittihad
18	MF	Andrei Prepeliță	8 December 1985 (aged 30)	10	0	(Bulgarian Football Union) Ludogorets Razgrad
19	FW	Bogdan Stancu	28 June 1987 (aged 28)	40	9	(Turkish Football Federation) Gençlerbirliği
20	MF	Adrian Popa	24 July 1988 (aged 27)	14	1	(Romanian Football Federation) Steaua București
21	DF	Dragoș Grigore	7 September 1986 (aged 29)	20	0	(Qatar Football Association) Al-Sailiya
22	DF	Cristian Săpunaru	5 April 1984 (aged 32)	13	0	(Romanian Football Federation) Pandurii Târgu Jiu
23	GK	Silviu Lung Jr.	4 June 1989 (aged 27)	3	0	(Romanian Football Federation) Astra Giurgiu

=== Albania ===
Manager: Gianni De Biasi

Albania named their final squad on 31 May.

No.	Pos.	Player	Date of birth (age)	Caps	Goals	Club
1	GK	Etrit Berisha	10 March 1989 (aged 27)	35	0	(Italian Football Federation) Lazio
2	DF	Andi Lila	12 February 1986 (aged 30)	58	0	(Hellenic Football Federation) PAS Giannina
3	MF	Ermir Lenjani	5 August 1989 (aged 26)	19	3	(French Football Federation) Nantes
4	DF	Elseid Hysaj	2 February 1994 (aged 22)	20	0	(Italian Football Federation) Napoli
5	DF	Lorik Cana (captain)	27 June 1983 (aged 32)	91	1	(French Football Federation) Nantes
6	DF	Frédéric Veseli	20 November 1992 (aged 23)	3	0	(Swiss Football Association) Lugano
7	DF	Ansi Agolli	11 November 1982 (aged 33)	61	2	(Association of Football Federations of Azerbaijan) Qarabağ
8	MF	Migjen Basha	5 January 1987 (aged 29)	19	3	(Italian Football Federation) Como
9	MF	Ledian Memushaj	7 December 1986 (aged 29)	14	0	(Italian Football Federation) Pescara
10	FW	Armando Sadiku	27 May 1991 (aged 25)	20	5	(Liechtenstein Football Association) Vaduz
11	FW	Shkëlzen Gashi	15 July 1988 (aged 27)	14	1	(United States Soccer Federation) Colorado Rapids
12	GK	Orges Shehi	25 September 1977 (aged 38)	7	0	(Albanian Football Federation) Skënderbeu Korçë
13	MF	Burim Kukeli	16 January 1984 (aged 32)	15	0	(Swiss Football Association) Zürich
14	MF	Taulant Xhaka	28 March 1991 (aged 25)	12	0	(Swiss Football Association) Basel
15	DF	Mërgim Mavraj	9 June 1986 (aged 30)	26	3	(German Football Association) 1. FC Köln
16	FW	Sokol Cikalleshi	27 July 1990 (aged 25)	19	2	(Turkish Football Federation) İstanbul Başakşehir
17	DF	Naser Aliji	27 December 1993 (aged 22)	5	0	(Swiss Football Association) Basel
18	DF	Arlind Ajeti	25 September 1993 (aged 22)	10	1	(Italian Football Federation) Frosinone
19	FW	Bekim Balaj	11 January 1991 (aged 25)	15	1	(Croatian Football Federation) Rijeka
20	MF	Ergys Kaçe	8 July 1993 (aged 22)	16	2	(Hellenic Football Federation) PAOK
21	MF	Odise Roshi	21 May 1991 (aged 25)	32	1	(Croatian Football Federation) Rijeka
22	MF	Amir Abrashi	27 March 1990 (aged 26)	18	0	(German Football Association) SC Freiburg
23	GK	Alban Hoxha	23 November 1987 (aged 28)	1	0	(Albanian Football Federation) Partizani

=== Switzerland ===
Manager: Vladimir Petković

Switzerland announced their final squad on 30 May.

No.	Pos.	Player	Date of birth (age)	Caps	Goals	Club
1	GK	Yann Sommer	7 December 1988 (aged 27)	18	0	(German Football Association) Borussia Mönchengladbach
2	DF	Stephan Lichtsteiner (captain)	16 January 1984 (aged 32)	81	5	(Italian Football Federation) Juventus
3	DF	François Moubandje	21 June 1990 (aged 25)	11	0	(French Football Federation) Toulouse
4	DF	Nico Elvedi	30 September 1996 (aged 19)	1	0	(German Football Association) Borussia Mönchengladbach
5	DF	Steve von Bergen	10 June 1983 (aged 33)	50	0	(Swiss Football Association) Young Boys
6	DF	Michael Lang	8 February 1991 (aged 25)	17	2	(Swiss Football Association) Basel
7	FW	Breel Embolo	14 February 1997 (aged 19)	10	1	(Swiss Football Association) Basel
8	MF	Fabian Frei	8 January 1989 (aged 27)	8	1	(German Football Association) Mainz 05
9	FW	Haris Seferovic	22 February 1992 (aged 24)	30	7	(German Football Association) Eintracht Frankfurt
10	MF	Granit Xhaka	27 September 1992 (aged 23)	43	6	(German Football Association) Borussia Mönchengladbach
11	MF	Valon Behrami	19 April 1985 (aged 31)	66	2	(The Football Association) Watford
12	GK	Marwin Hitz	18 September 1987 (aged 28)	2	0	(German Football Association) FC Augsburg
13	DF	Ricardo Rodriguez	25 August 1992 (aged 23)	37	0	(German Football Association) VfL Wolfsburg
14	MF	Denis Zakaria	20 November 1996 (aged 19)	2	0	(Swiss Football Association) Young Boys
15	MF	Blerim Džemaili	12 April 1986 (aged 30)	48	6	(Italian Football Federation) Genoa
16	MF	Gelson Fernandes	2 September 1986 (aged 29)	56	2	(French Football Federation) Rennes
17	FW	Shani Tarashaj	7 February 1995 (aged 21)	4	0	(Swiss Football Association) Grasshopper
18	FW	Admir Mehmedi	16 March 1991 (aged 25)	42	4	(German Football Association) Bayer Leverkusen
19	FW	Eren Derdiyok	12 June 1988 (aged 27)	52	10	(Turkish Football Federation) Kasımpaşa
20	DF	Johan Djourou	18 January 1987 (aged 29)	60	2	(German Football Association) Hamburger SV
21	GK	Roman Bürki	14 November 1990 (aged 25)	5	0	(German Football Association) Borussia Dortmund
22	DF	Fabian Schär	20 December 1991 (aged 24)	20	5	(German Football Association) 1899 Hoffenheim
23	MF	Xherdan Shaqiri	10 October 1991 (aged 24)	53	17	(The Football Association) Stoke City

== Group B ==
=== England ===
Manager: Roy Hodgson

England named their final squad on 31 May.

No.	Pos.	Player	Date of birth (age)	Caps	Goals	Club
1	GK	Joe Hart	19 April 1987 (aged 29)	59	0	(The Football Association) Manchester City
2	DF	Kyle Walker	28 May 1990 (aged 26)	16	0	(The Football Association) Tottenham Hotspur
3	DF	Danny Rose	2 July 1990 (aged 25)	4	0	(The Football Association) Tottenham Hotspur
4	MF	James Milner	4 January 1986 (aged 30)	60	1	(The Football Association) Liverpool
5	DF	Gary Cahill	19 December 1985 (aged 30)	43	3	(The Football Association) Chelsea
6	DF	Chris Smalling	22 November 1989 (aged 26)	25	1	(The Football Association) Manchester United
7	MF	Raheem Sterling	8 December 1994 (aged 21)	23	2	(The Football Association) Manchester City
8	MF	Adam Lallana	10 May 1988 (aged 28)	23	0	(The Football Association) Liverpool
9	FW	Harry Kane	28 July 1993 (aged 22)	12	5	(The Football Association) Tottenham Hotspur
10	FW	Wayne Rooney (captain)	24 October 1985 (aged 30)	111	52	(The Football Association) Manchester United
11	FW	Jamie Vardy	11 January 1987 (aged 29)	8	3	(The Football Association) Leicester City
12	DF	Nathaniel Clyne	5 April 1991 (aged 25)	12	0	(The Football Association) Liverpool
13	GK	Fraser Forster	17 March 1988 (aged 28)	6	0	(The Football Association) Southampton
14	MF	Jordan Henderson	17 June 1990 (aged 25)	26	0	(The Football Association) Liverpool
15	FW	Daniel Sturridge	1 September 1989 (aged 26)	18	5	(The Football Association) Liverpool
16	DF	John Stones	28 May 1994 (aged 22)	10	0	(The Football Association) Everton
17	MF	Eric Dier	15 January 1994 (aged 22)	7	1	(The Football Association) Tottenham Hotspur
18	MF	Jack Wilshere	1 January 1992 (aged 24)	31	2	(The Football Association) Arsenal
19	MF	Ross Barkley	5 December 1993 (aged 22)	22	2	(The Football Association) Everton
20	MF	Dele Alli	11 April 1996 (aged 20)	8	1	(The Football Association) Tottenham Hotspur
21	DF	Ryan Bertrand	5 August 1989 (aged 26)	8	0	(The Football Association) Southampton
22	FW	Marcus Rashford	31 October 1997 (aged 18)	1	1	(The Football Association) Manchester United
23	GK	Tom Heaton	15 April 1986 (aged 30)	1	0	(The Football Association) Burnley

=== Russia ===
Manager: Leonid Slutsky

Russia announced their final squad on 21 May. Midfielder Alan Dzagoev was in the original squad but was dropped due to a broken metatarsal and was replaced by Dmitri Torbinski on 22 May. On 7 June, Igor Denisov was replaced by Artur Yusupov after suffering a hamstring injury.

No.	Pos.	Player	Date of birth (age)	Caps	Goals	Club
1	GK	Igor Akinfeev	8 April 1986 (aged 30)	86	0	(Russian Football Union) CSKA Moscow
2	DF	Roman Shishkin	27 January 1987 (aged 29)	10	0	(Russian Football Union) Lokomotiv Moscow
3	DF	Igor Smolnikov	8 August 1988 (aged 27)	12	0	(Russian Football Union) Zenit Saint Petersburg
4	DF	Sergei Ignashevich	14 July 1979 (aged 36)	115	8	(Russian Football Union) CSKA Moscow
5	DF	Roman Neustädter	18 February 1988 (aged 28)	1	0	(German Football Association) Schalke 04
6	DF	Aleksei Berezutski	20 June 1982 (aged 33)	57	0	(Russian Football Union) CSKA Moscow
7	MF	Artur Yusupov	1 September 1989 (aged 26)	2	0	(Russian Football Union) Zenit Saint Petersburg
8	MF	Denis Glushakov	27 January 1987 (aged 29)	42	4	(Russian Football Union) Spartak Moscow
9	FW	Aleksandr Kokorin	19 March 1991 (aged 25)	37	11	(Russian Football Union) Zenit Saint Petersburg
10	FW	Fyodor Smolov	5 February 1990 (aged 26)	12	5	(Russian Football Union) Krasnodar
11	MF	Pavel Mamayev	17 September 1988 (aged 27)	10	0	(Russian Football Union) Krasnodar
12	GK	Yuri Lodygin	26 May 1990 (aged 26)	10	0	(Russian Football Union) Zenit Saint Petersburg
13	MF	Aleksandr Golovin	30 May 1996 (aged 20)	3	2	(Russian Football Union) CSKA Moscow
14	DF	Vasili Berezutski	20 June 1982 (aged 33)	93	4	(Russian Football Union) CSKA Moscow
15	MF	Roman Shirokov (captain)	6 July 1981 (aged 34)	53	13	(Russian Football Union) CSKA Moscow
16	GK	Guilherme Marinato	12 December 1985 (aged 30)	1	0	(Russian Football Union) Lokomotiv Moscow
17	MF	Oleg Shatov	29 June 1990 (aged 25)	21	2	(Russian Football Union) Zenit Saint Petersburg
18	MF	Oleg Ivanov	4 August 1986 (aged 29)	3	0	(Russian Football Union) Terek Grozny
19	MF	Aleksandr Samedov	19 July 1984 (aged 31)	28	3	(Russian Football Union) Lokomotiv Moscow
20	MF	Dmitri Torbinski	28 April 1984 (aged 32)	28	2	(Russian Football Union) Krasnodar
21	DF	Georgi Shchennikov	27 April 1991 (aged 25)	7	0	(Russian Football Union) CSKA Moscow
22	FW	Artem Dzyuba	22 August 1988 (aged 27)	16	8	(Russian Football Union) Zenit Saint Petersburg
23	DF	Dmitri Kombarov	22 January 1987 (aged 29)	38	2	(Russian Football Union) Spartak Moscow

=== Wales ===
Manager: Chris Coleman

Wales announced their final squad on 31 May.

No.	Pos.	Player	Date of birth (age)	Caps	Goals	Club
1	GK	Wayne Hennessey	24 January 1987 (aged 29)	57	0	(The Football Association) Crystal Palace
2	DF	Chris Gunter	21 July 1989 (aged 26)	67	0	(The Football Association) Reading
3	DF	Neil Taylor	7 February 1989 (aged 27)	28	0	(Football Association of Wales) Swansea City
4	DF	Ben Davies	24 April 1993 (aged 23)	20	0	(The Football Association) Tottenham Hotspur
5	DF	James Chester	23 January 1989 (aged 27)	11	0	(The Football Association) West Bromwich Albion
6	DF	Ashley Williams (captain)	23 August 1984 (aged 31)	59	1	(Football Association of Wales) Swansea City
7	MF	Joe Allen	14 March 1990 (aged 26)	25	0	(The Football Association) Liverpool
8	MF	Andy King	29 October 1988 (aged 27)	33	2	(The Football Association) Leicester City
9	FW	Hal Robson-Kanu	21 May 1989 (aged 27)	30	2	(The Football Association) Reading
10	MF	Aaron Ramsey	26 December 1990 (aged 25)	39	10	(The Football Association) Arsenal
11	FW	Gareth Bale	16 July 1989 (aged 26)	55	19	(Royal Spanish Football Federation) Real Madrid
12	GK	Owain Fôn Williams	17 March 1987 (aged 29)	1	0	(Scottish Football Association) Inverness Caledonian Thistle
13	FW	George Williams	7 September 1995 (aged 20)	7	0	(The Football Association) Gillingham
14	MF	David Edwards	3 February 1986 (aged 30)	32	3	(The Football Association) Wolverhampton Wanderers
15	DF	Jazz Richards	12 April 1991 (aged 25)	9	0	(The Football Association) Fulham
16	MF	Joe Ledley	23 January 1987 (aged 29)	61	4	(The Football Association) Crystal Palace
17	FW	David Cotterill	4 December 1987 (aged 28)	23	2	(The Football Association) Birmingham City
18	FW	Sam Vokes	21 October 1989 (aged 26)	40	6	(The Football Association) Burnley
19	DF	James Collins	23 August 1983 (aged 32)	47	3	(The Football Association) West Ham United
20	MF	Jonny Williams	9 October 1993 (aged 22)	12	0	(The Football Association) Milton Keynes Dons
21	GK	Danny Ward	22 June 1993 (aged 22)	2	0	(The Football Association) Liverpool
22	MF	David Vaughan	18 February 1983 (aged 33)	42	1	(The Football Association) Nottingham Forest
23	FW	Simon Church	10 December 1988 (aged 27)	36	3	(Scottish Football Association) Aberdeen

=== Slovakia ===
Manager: Ján Kozák

Slovakia announced their final squad on 30 May.

No.	Pos.	Player	Date of birth (age)	Caps	Goals	Club
1	GK	Ján Mucha	5 December 1982 (aged 33)	46	0	(Slovak Football Association) Slovan Bratislava
2	DF	Peter Pekarík	30 October 1986 (aged 29)	67	2	(German Football Association) Hertha BSC
3	DF	Martin Škrtel (captain)	15 December 1984 (aged 31)	81	5	(The Football Association) Liverpool
4	DF	Ján Ďurica	10 December 1981 (aged 34)	79	4	(Russian Football Union) Lokomotiv Moscow
5	DF	Norbert Gyömbér	3 July 1992 (aged 23)	13	0	(Italian Football Federation) Roma
6	MF	Ján Greguš	29 January 1991 (aged 25)	7	0	(Football Association of the Czech Republic) Baumit Jablonec
7	MF	Vladimír Weiss	30 November 1989 (aged 26)	52	4	(Qatar Football Association) Al-Gharafa
8	MF	Ondrej Duda	5 December 1994 (aged 21)	11	1	(Polish Football Association) Legia Warsaw
9	FW	Stanislav Šesták	16 December 1982 (aged 33)	65	13	(Hungarian Football Federation) Ferencváros
10	MF	Miroslav Stoch	19 October 1989 (aged 26)	54	6	(Turkish Football Federation) Bursaspor
11	FW	Adam Nemec	2 September 1985 (aged 30)	22	6	(Royal Dutch Football Association) Willem II
12	GK	Ján Novota	29 November 1983 (aged 32)	3	0	(Austrian Football Association) Rapid Wien
13	MF	Patrik Hrošovský	22 April 1992 (aged 24)	12	0	(Football Association of the Czech Republic) Viktoria Plzeň
14	DF	Milan Škriniar	11 February 1995 (aged 21)	2	0	(Italian Football Federation) Sampdoria
15	DF	Tomáš Hubočan	17 September 1985 (aged 30)	44	0	(Russian Football Union) Dynamo Moscow
16	DF	Kornel Saláta	24 January 1985 (aged 31)	37	2	(Slovak Football Association) Slovan Bratislava
17	MF	Marek Hamšík	27 July 1987 (aged 28)	87	18	(Italian Football Federation) Napoli
18	DF	Dušan Švento	1 August 1985 (aged 30)	39	1	(German Football Association) 1. FC Köln
19	MF	Juraj Kucka	26 February 1987 (aged 29)	47	5	(Italian Football Federation) Milan
20	MF	Róbert Mak	8 March 1991 (aged 25)	27	7	(Hellenic Football Federation) PAOK
21	FW	Michal Ďuriš	1 June 1988 (aged 28)	26	4	(Football Association of the Czech Republic) Viktoria Plzeň
22	MF	Viktor Pečovský	24 May 1983 (aged 33)	32	1	(Slovak Football Association) Žilina
23	GK	Matúš Kozáčik	27 December 1983 (aged 32)	17	0	(Football Association of the Czech Republic) Viktoria Plzeň

== Group C ==
=== Germany ===
Manager: Joachim Löw

Germany announced their final squad on 31 May. On 7 June, Antonio Rüdiger suffered an injury and was replaced by Jonathan Tah one day later.

No.	Pos.	Player	Date of birth (age)	Caps	Goals	Club
1	GK	Manuel Neuer	27 March 1986 (aged 30)	65	0	(German Football Association) Bayern Munich
2	DF	Shkodran Mustafi	17 April 1992 (aged 24)	10	0	(Royal Spanish Football Federation) Valencia
3	DF	Jonas Hector	27 May 1990 (aged 26)	14	1	(German Football Association) 1. FC Köln
4	DF	Benedikt Höwedes	29 February 1988 (aged 28)	34	2	(German Football Association) Schalke 04
5	DF	Mats Hummels	16 December 1988 (aged 27)	46	4	(German Football Association) Borussia Dortmund
6	MF	Sami Khedira	4 April 1987 (aged 29)	60	5	(Italian Football Federation) Juventus
7	MF	Bastian Schweinsteiger (captain)	1 August 1984 (aged 31)	115	23	(The Football Association) Manchester United
8	MF	Mesut Özil	15 October 1988 (aged 27)	73	19	(The Football Association) Arsenal
9	MF	André Schürrle	6 November 1990 (aged 25)	52	20	(German Football Association) VfL Wolfsburg
10	FW	Lukas Podolski	4 June 1985 (aged 31)	128	48	(Turkish Football Federation) Galatasaray
11	MF	Julian Draxler	20 September 1993 (aged 22)	19	1	(German Football Association) VfL Wolfsburg
12	GK	Bernd Leno	4 March 1992 (aged 24)	1	0	(German Football Association) Bayer Leverkusen
13	FW	Thomas Müller	13 September 1989 (aged 26)	71	32	(German Football Association) Bayern Munich
14	MF	Emre Can	12 January 1994 (aged 22)	6	0	(The Football Association) Liverpool
15	MF	Julian Weigl	8 September 1995 (aged 20)	1	0	(German Football Association) Borussia Dortmund
16	DF	Jonathan Tah	11 February 1996 (aged 20)	1	0	(German Football Association) Bayer Leverkusen
17	DF	Jérôme Boateng	3 September 1988 (aged 27)	59	0	(German Football Association) Bayern Munich
18	MF	Toni Kroos	4 January 1990 (aged 26)	65	11	(Royal Spanish Football Federation) Real Madrid
19	MF	Mario Götze	3 June 1992 (aged 24)	52	17	(German Football Association) Bayern Munich
20	MF	Leroy Sané	11 January 1996 (aged 20)	3	0	(German Football Association) Schalke 04
21	DF	Joshua Kimmich	8 February 1995 (aged 21)	1	0	(German Football Association) Bayern Munich
22	GK	Marc-André ter Stegen	30 April 1992 (aged 24)	6	0	(Royal Spanish Football Federation) Barcelona
23	FW	Mario Gómez	10 July 1985 (aged 30)	64	27	(Turkish Football Federation) Beşiktaş

=== Ukraine ===
Manager: Mykhaylo Fomenko

Ukraine announced their final squad on 31 May.

No.	Pos.	Player	Date of birth (age)	Caps	Goals	Club
1	GK	Denys Boyko	29 January 1988 (aged 28)	4	0	(Turkish Football Federation) Beşiktaş
2	DF	Bohdan Butko	13 January 1991 (aged 25)	17	0	(Russian Football Union) Amkar Perm
3	DF	Yevhen Khacheridi	28 July 1987 (aged 28)	42	3	(Ukrainian Association of Football) Dynamo Kyiv
4	MF	Anatoliy Tymoshchuk (captain)	30 March 1979 (aged 37)	143	4	(Kazakhstan Football Federation) Kairat Almaty
5	DF	Oleksandr Kucher	22 October 1982 (aged 33)	50	2	(Ukrainian Association of Football) Shakhtar Donetsk
6	MF	Taras Stepanenko	8 August 1989 (aged 26)	29	3	(Ukrainian Association of Football) Shakhtar Donetsk
7	FW	Andriy Yarmolenko	23 October 1989 (aged 26)	59	25	(Ukrainian Association of Football) Dynamo Kyiv
8	FW	Roman Zozulya	17 November 1989 (aged 26)	26	4	(Ukrainian Association of Football) Dnipro Dnipropetrovsk
9	MF	Viktor Kovalenko	14 February 1996 (aged 20)	3	0	(Ukrainian Association of Football) Shakhtar Donetsk
10	MF	Yevhen Konoplyanka	29 September 1989 (aged 26)	53	13	(Royal Spanish Football Federation) Sevilla
11	FW	Yevhen Seleznyov	20 July 1985 (aged 30)	50	11	(Russian Football Union) Kuban Krasnodar
12	GK	Andriy Pyatov	28 June 1984 (aged 31)	64	0	(Ukrainian Association of Football) Shakhtar Donetsk
13	DF	Vyacheslav Shevchuk	13 May 1979 (aged 37)	54	0	(Ukrainian Association of Football) Shakhtar Donetsk
14	MF	Ruslan Rotan	29 October 1981 (aged 34)	88	7	(Ukrainian Association of Football) Dnipro Dnipropetrovsk
15	FW	Pylyp Budkivskyi	10 March 1992 (aged 24)	6	0	(Ukrainian Association of Football) Zorya Luhansk
16	MF	Serhiy Sydorchuk	2 May 1991 (aged 25)	12	2	(Ukrainian Association of Football) Dynamo Kyiv
17	DF	Artem Fedetskyi	26 April 1985 (aged 31)	49	2	(Ukrainian Association of Football) Dnipro Dnipropetrovsk
18	MF	Serhiy Rybalka	1 April 1990 (aged 26)	9	0	(Ukrainian Association of Football) Dynamo Kyiv
19	MF	Denys Harmash	19 April 1990 (aged 26)	27	2	(Ukrainian Association of Football) Dynamo Kyiv
20	DF	Yaroslav Rakitskiy	3 August 1989 (aged 26)	40	4	(Ukrainian Association of Football) Shakhtar Donetsk
21	DF	Oleksandr Zinchenko	15 December 1996 (aged 19)	3	1	(Russian Football Union) Ufa
22	MF	Oleksandr Karavayev	2 June 1992 (aged 24)	3	0	(Ukrainian Association of Football) Zorya Luhansk
23	GK	Mykyta Shevchenko	26 January 1993 (aged 23)	0	0	(Ukrainian Association of Football) Zorya Luhansk

=== Poland ===
Manager: Adam Nawałka

Poland announced their final squad on 30 May.

No.	Pos.	Player	Date of birth (age)	Caps	Goals	Club
1	GK	Wojciech Szczęsny	18 April 1990 (aged 26)	26	0	(Italian Football Federation) Roma
2	DF	Michał Pazdan	21 September 1987 (aged 28)	17	0	(Polish Football Association) Legia Warsaw
3	DF	Artur Jędrzejczyk	4 November 1987 (aged 28)	19	3	(Polish Football Association) Legia Warsaw
4	DF	Thiago Cionek	21 April 1986 (aged 30)	6	0	(Italian Football Federation) Palermo
5	MF	Krzysztof Mączyński	23 May 1987 (aged 29)	16	1	(Polish Football Association) Wisła Kraków
6	MF	Tomasz Jodłowiec	8 September 1985 (aged 30)	44	1	(Polish Football Association) Legia Warsaw
7	FW	Arkadiusz Milik	28 February 1994 (aged 22)	26	10	(Royal Dutch Football Association) Ajax
8	MF	Karol Linetty	2 February 1995 (aged 21)	10	1	(Polish Football Association) Lech Poznań
9	FW	Robert Lewandowski (captain)	21 August 1988 (aged 27)	76	34	(German Football Association) Bayern Munich
10	MF	Grzegorz Krychowiak	29 January 1990 (aged 26)	34	2	(Royal Spanish Football Federation) Sevilla
11	MF	Kamil Grosicki	8 June 1988 (aged 28)	39	8	(French Football Federation) Rennes
12	GK	Artur Boruc	20 February 1980 (aged 36)	63	0	(The Football Association) Bournemouth
13	FW	Mariusz Stępiński	12 May 1995 (aged 21)	3	0	(Polish Football Association) Ruch Chorzów
14	DF	Jakub Wawrzyniak	7 July 1983 (aged 32)	49	1	(Polish Football Association) Lechia Gdańsk
15	DF	Kamil Glik	3 February 1988 (aged 28)	41	3	(Italian Football Federation) Torino
16	MF	Jakub Błaszczykowski	14 December 1985 (aged 30)	79	16	(Italian Football Federation) Fiorentina
17	MF	Sławomir Peszko	19 February 1985 (aged 31)	37	2	(Polish Football Association) Lechia Gdańsk
18	DF	Bartosz Salamon	1 May 1991 (aged 25)	8	0	(Italian Football Federation) Cagliari
19	MF	Piotr Zieliński	20 May 1994 (aged 22)	15	3	(Italian Football Federation) Empoli
20	DF	Łukasz Piszczek	3 June 1985 (aged 31)	46	2	(German Football Association) Borussia Dortmund
21	MF	Bartosz Kapustka	23 December 1996 (aged 19)	7	2	(Polish Football Association) Cracovia
22	GK	Łukasz Fabiański	18 April 1985 (aged 31)	30	0	(Football Association of Wales) Swansea City
23	MF	Filip Starzyński	27 May 1991 (aged 25)	3	1	(Polish Football Association) Zagłębie Lubin

=== Northern Ireland ===
Manager: Michael O'Neill

Northern Ireland announced their squad on 28 May.

No.	Pos.	Player	Date of birth (age)	Caps	Goals	Club
1	GK	Michael McGovern	12 July 1984 (aged 31)	11	0	(Scottish Football Association) Hamilton Academical
2	DF	Conor McLaughlin	26 July 1991 (aged 24)	18	0	(The Football Association) Fleetwood Town
3	MF	Shane Ferguson	12 July 1991 (aged 24)	25	1	(The Football Association) Millwall
4	DF	Gareth McAuley	5 December 1979 (aged 36)	61	7	(The Football Association) West Bromwich Albion
5	DF	Jonny Evans	3 January 1988 (aged 28)	49	1	(The Football Association) West Bromwich Albion
6	DF	Chris Baird	25 February 1982 (aged 34)	78	0	(The Football Association) Fulham
7	MF	Niall McGinn	20 July 1987 (aged 28)	42	2	(Scottish Football Association) Aberdeen
8	MF	Steven Davis (captain)	1 January 1985 (aged 31)	83	8	(The Football Association) Southampton
9	FW	Will Grigg	3 July 1991 (aged 24)	8	1	(The Football Association) Wigan Athletic
10	FW	Kyle Lafferty	16 September 1987 (aged 28)	51	17	(The Football Association) Birmingham City
11	FW	Conor Washington	18 May 1992 (aged 24)	4	2	(The Football Association) Queens Park Rangers
12	GK	Roy Carroll	30 September 1977 (aged 38)	44	0	(The Football Association) Notts County
13	MF	Corry Evans	30 July 1990 (aged 25)	34	1	(The Football Association) Blackburn Rovers
14	MF	Stuart Dallas	19 April 1991 (aged 25)	13	1	(The Football Association) Leeds United
15	DF	Luke McCullough	15 February 1994 (aged 22)	5	0	(The Football Association) Doncaster Rovers
16	MF	Oliver Norwood	12 April 1991 (aged 25)	34	0	(The Football Association) Reading
17	DF	Paddy McNair	27 April 1995 (aged 21)	9	0	(The Football Association) Manchester United
18	DF	Aaron Hughes	8 November 1979 (aged 36)	100	1	(Football Australia) Melbourne City
19	MF	Jamie Ward	12 May 1986 (aged 30)	22	2	(The Football Association) Nottingham Forest
20	DF	Craig Cathcart	6 February 1989 (aged 27)	28	2	(The Football Association) Watford
21	FW	Josh Magennis	15 August 1990 (aged 25)	19	1	(Scottish Football Association) Kilmarnock
22	DF	Lee Hodson	2 October 1991 (aged 24)	16	0	(The Football Association) Milton Keynes Dons
23	GK	Alan Mannus	19 May 1982 (aged 34)	8	0	(Scottish Football Association) St Johnstone

== Group D ==
=== Spain ===
Manager: Vicente del Bosque

Spain announced their final squad on 31 May. Héctor Bellerín replaced Dani Carvajal due to an injury suffered during the UEFA Champions League final on 28 May.

No.	Pos.	Player	Date of birth (age)	Caps	Goals	Club
1	GK	Iker Casillas (captain)	20 May 1981 (aged 35)	167	0	(Portuguese Football Federation) Porto
2	DF	César Azpilicueta	28 August 1989 (aged 26)	15	0	(The Football Association) Chelsea
3	DF	Gerard Piqué	2 February 1987 (aged 29)	77	4	(Royal Spanish Football Federation) Barcelona
4	DF	Marc Bartra	15 January 1991 (aged 25)	10	0	(Royal Spanish Football Federation) Barcelona
5	MF	Sergio Busquets	16 July 1988 (aged 27)	84	2	(Royal Spanish Football Federation) Barcelona
6	MF	Andrés Iniesta	11 May 1984 (aged 32)	109	13	(Royal Spanish Football Federation) Barcelona
7	FW	Álvaro Morata	23 October 1992 (aged 23)	9	3	(Italian Football Federation) Juventus
8	MF	Koke	8 January 1992 (aged 24)	23	0	(Royal Spanish Football Federation) Atlético Madrid
9	FW	Lucas Vázquez	1 July 1991 (aged 24)	1	0	(Royal Spanish Football Federation) Real Madrid
10	MF	Cesc Fàbregas	4 May 1987 (aged 29)	106	15	(The Football Association) Chelsea
11	FW	Pedro	28 July 1987 (aged 28)	58	17	(The Football Association) Chelsea
12	DF	Héctor Bellerín	19 March 1995 (aged 21)	3	0	(The Football Association) Arsenal
13	GK	David de Gea	7 November 1990 (aged 25)	9	0	(The Football Association) Manchester United
14	MF	Thiago	11 April 1991 (aged 25)	10	0	(German Football Association) Bayern Munich
15	DF	Sergio Ramos	30 March 1986 (aged 30)	132	10	(Royal Spanish Football Federation) Real Madrid
16	DF	Juanfran	9 January 1985 (aged 31)	18	0	(Royal Spanish Football Federation) Atlético Madrid
17	DF	Mikel San José	30 May 1989 (aged 27)	7	0	(Royal Spanish Football Federation) Athletic Bilbao
18	DF	Jordi Alba	21 March 1989 (aged 27)	43	6	(Royal Spanish Football Federation) Barcelona
19	MF	Bruno Soriano	12 June 1984 (aged 31)	8	0	(Royal Spanish Football Federation) Villarreal
20	FW	Aritz Aduriz	11 February 1981 (aged 35)	6	1	(Royal Spanish Football Federation) Athletic Bilbao
21	MF	David Silva	8 January 1986 (aged 30)	99	24	(The Football Association) Manchester City
22	FW	Nolito	15 October 1986 (aged 29)	9	4	(Royal Spanish Football Federation) Celta Vigo
23	GK	Sergio Rico	1 September 1993 (aged 22)	1	0	(Royal Spanish Football Federation) Sevilla

=== Czech Republic ===
Manager: Pavel Vrba

Czech Republic announced their final squad on 31 May.

No.	Pos.	Player	Date of birth (age)	Caps	Goals	Club
1	GK	Petr Čech	20 May 1982 (aged 34)	121	0	(The Football Association) Arsenal
2	DF	Pavel Kadeřábek	25 April 1992 (aged 24)	18	2	(German Football Association) 1899 Hoffenheim
3	DF	Michal Kadlec	13 December 1984 (aged 31)	65	8	(Turkish Football Federation) Fenerbahçe
4	DF	Theodor Gebre Selassie	24 December 1986 (aged 29)	36	1	(German Football Association) Werder Bremen
5	DF	Roman Hubník	6 June 1984 (aged 32)	26	3	(Football Association of the Czech Republic) Viktoria Plzeň
6	DF	Tomáš Sivok	15 September 1983 (aged 32)	55	5	(Turkish Football Federation) Bursaspor
7	FW	Tomáš Necid	13 August 1989 (aged 26)	39	11	(Turkish Football Federation) Bursaspor
8	DF	David Limberský	6 October 1983 (aged 32)	38	1	(Football Association of the Czech Republic) Viktoria Plzeň
9	MF	Bořek Dočkal	30 September 1988 (aged 27)	24	6	(Football Association of the Czech Republic) Sparta Prague
10	MF	Tomáš Rosický (captain)	4 October 1980 (aged 35)	103	23	(The Football Association) Arsenal
11	MF	Daniel Pudil	27 September 1985 (aged 30)	32	2	(The Football Association) Sheffield Wednesday
12	FW	Milan Škoda	16 January 1986 (aged 30)	9	3	(Football Association of the Czech Republic) Slavia Prague
13	MF	Jaroslav Plašil	5 January 1982 (aged 34)	100	7	(French Football Federation) Bordeaux
14	MF	Daniel Kolář	27 October 1985 (aged 30)	28	2	(Football Association of the Czech Republic) Viktoria Plzeň
15	MF	David Pavelka	18 May 1991 (aged 25)	8	0	(Turkish Football Federation) Kasımpaşa
16	GK	Tomáš Vaclík	29 March 1989 (aged 27)	6	0	(Swiss Football Association) Basel
17	DF	Marek Suchý	29 March 1988 (aged 28)	27	1	(Swiss Football Association) Basel
18	MF	Josef Šural	30 May 1990 (aged 26)	11	1	(Football Association of the Czech Republic) Sparta Prague
19	MF	Ladislav Krejčí	5 July 1992 (aged 23)	23	4	(Football Association of the Czech Republic) Sparta Prague
20	MF	Jiří Skalák	12 March 1992 (aged 24)	10	0	(The Football Association) Brighton & Hove Albion
21	FW	David Lafata	18 September 1981 (aged 34)	39	9	(Football Association of the Czech Republic) Sparta Prague
22	MF	Vladimír Darida	8 August 1990 (aged 25)	36	1	(German Football Association) Hertha BSC
23	GK	Tomáš Koubek	26 August 1992 (aged 23)	2	0	(Football Association of the Czech Republic) Slovan Liberec

=== Turkey ===
Manager: Fatih Terim

Turkey announced their final squad on 31 May.

No.	Pos.	Player	Date of birth (age)	Caps	Goals	Club
1	GK	Volkan Babacan	12 August 1988 (aged 27)	17	0	(Turkish Football Federation) İstanbul Başakşehir
2	DF	Semih Kaya	24 February 1991 (aged 25)	23	0	(Turkish Football Federation) Galatasaray
3	DF	Hakan Balta	23 March 1983 (aged 33)	46	2	(Turkish Football Federation) Galatasaray
4	DF	Ahmet Yılmaz Çalık	26 February 1994 (aged 22)	4	0	(Turkish Football Federation) Gençlerbirliği
5	MF	Nuri Şahin	5 September 1988 (aged 27)	49	2	(German Football Association) Borussia Dortmund
6	MF	Hakan Çalhanoğlu	8 February 1994 (aged 22)	19	6	(German Football Association) Bayer Leverkusen
7	DF	Gökhan Gönül	4 January 1985 (aged 31)	57	1	(Turkish Football Federation) Fenerbahçe
8	MF	Selçuk İnan	10 February 1985 (aged 31)	52	8	(Turkish Football Federation) Galatasaray
9	FW	Cenk Tosun	7 June 1991 (aged 25)	9	3	(Turkish Football Federation) Beşiktaş
10	MF	Arda Turan (captain)	30 January 1987 (aged 29)	91	17	(Royal Spanish Football Federation) Barcelona
11	MF	Olcay Şahan	26 May 1987 (aged 29)	24	2	(Turkish Football Federation) Beşiktaş
12	GK	Onur Kıvrak	1 January 1988 (aged 28)	12	0	(Turkish Football Federation) Trabzonspor
13	DF	İsmail Köybaşı	10 July 1989 (aged 26)	19	0	(Turkish Football Federation) Beşiktaş
14	MF	Oğuzhan Özyakup	23 September 1992 (aged 23)	20	1	(Turkish Football Federation) Beşiktaş
15	MF	Mehmet Topal	3 March 1986 (aged 30)	59	1	(Turkish Football Federation) Fenerbahçe
16	MF	Ozan Tufan	23 March 1995 (aged 21)	24	1	(Turkish Football Federation) Fenerbahçe
17	FW	Burak Yılmaz	15 July 1985 (aged 30)	44	20	(Chinese Football Association) Beijing Guoan
18	MF	Caner Erkin	4 October 1988 (aged 27)	47	2	(Turkish Football Federation) Fenerbahçe
19	MF	Yunus Mallı	24 February 1992 (aged 24)	6	0	(German Football Association) Mainz 05
20	MF	Volkan Şen	7 July 1987 (aged 28)	17	0	(Turkish Football Federation) Fenerbahçe
21	FW	Emre Mor	24 July 1997 (aged 18)	2	0	(Danish Football Association) Nordsjælland
22	DF	Şener Özbayraklı	23 January 1990 (aged 26)	8	0	(Turkish Football Federation) Fenerbahçe
23	GK	Harun Tekin	17 June 1989 (aged 26)	0	0	(Turkish Football Federation) Bursaspor

=== Croatia ===
Manager: Ante Čačić

Croatia named their final squad on 31 May.

No.	Pos.	Player	Date of birth (age)	Caps	Goals	Club
1	GK	Ivan Vargić	15 March 1987 (aged 29)	2	0	(Croatian Football Federation) Rijeka
2	DF	Šime Vrsaljko	10 January 1992 (aged 24)	19	0	(Italian Football Federation) Sassuolo
3	DF	Ivan Strinić	17 July 1987 (aged 28)	35	0	(Italian Football Federation) Napoli
4	MF	Ivan Perišić	2 February 1989 (aged 27)	47	13	(Italian Football Federation) Inter Milan
5	DF	Vedran Ćorluka	5 February 1986 (aged 30)	88	4	(Russian Football Union) Lokomotiv Moscow
6	DF	Tin Jedvaj	28 November 1995 (aged 20)	3	0	(German Football Association) Bayer Leverkusen
7	MF	Ivan Rakitić	10 March 1988 (aged 28)	76	11	(Royal Spanish Football Federation) Barcelona
8	MF	Mateo Kovačić	6 May 1994 (aged 22)	27	1	(Royal Spanish Football Federation) Real Madrid
9	FW	Andrej Kramarić	19 June 1991 (aged 24)	11	4	(German Football Association) 1899 Hoffenheim
10	MF	Luka Modrić	9 September 1985 (aged 30)	90	10	(Royal Spanish Football Federation) Real Madrid
11	DF	Darijo Srna (captain)	1 May 1982 (aged 34)	130	22	(Ukrainian Association of Football) Shakhtar Donetsk
12	GK	Lovre Kalinić	3 April 1990 (aged 26)	4	0	(Croatian Football Federation) Hajduk Split
13	DF	Gordon Schildenfeld	18 March 1985 (aged 31)	27	1	(Croatian Football Federation) Dinamo Zagreb
14	MF	Marcelo Brozović	16 November 1992 (aged 23)	17	4	(Italian Football Federation) Inter Milan
15	MF	Marko Rog	19 July 1995 (aged 20)	3	0	(Croatian Football Federation) Dinamo Zagreb
16	FW	Nikola Kalinić	5 January 1988 (aged 28)	29	11	(Italian Football Federation) Fiorentina
17	FW	Mario Mandžukić	21 May 1986 (aged 30)	66	24	(Italian Football Federation) Juventus
18	MF	Ante Ćorić	14 April 1997 (aged 19)	2	0	(Croatian Football Federation) Dinamo Zagreb
19	MF	Milan Badelj	25 February 1989 (aged 27)	20	1	(Italian Football Federation) Fiorentina
20	FW	Marko Pjaca	6 May 1995 (aged 21)	8	1	(Croatian Football Federation) Dinamo Zagreb
21	DF	Domagoj Vida	29 April 1989 (aged 27)	38	1	(Ukrainian Association of Football) Dynamo Kyiv
22	FW	Duje Čop	1 February 1990 (aged 26)	4	0	(Royal Spanish Football Federation) Málaga
23	GK	Danijel Subašić	27 October 1984 (aged 31)	21	0	(French Football Federation) Monaco

== Group E ==
=== Belgium ===
Manager: Marc Wilmots

Belgium announced their final squad on 31 May.

No.	Pos.	Player	Date of birth (age)	Caps	Goals	Club
1	GK	Thibaut Courtois	11 May 1992 (aged 24)	37	0	(The Football Association) Chelsea
2	DF	Toby Alderweireld	2 March 1989 (aged 27)	55	1	(The Football Association) Tottenham Hotspur
3	DF	Thomas Vermaelen	14 November 1985 (aged 30)	53	1	(Royal Spanish Football Federation) Barcelona
4	MF	Radja Nainggolan	4 May 1988 (aged 28)	19	4	(Italian Football Federation) Roma
5	DF	Jan Vertonghen	24 April 1987 (aged 29)	77	6	(The Football Association) Tottenham Hotspur
6	MF	Axel Witsel	12 January 1989 (aged 27)	67	6	(Russian Football Union) Zenit Saint Petersburg
7	FW	Kevin De Bruyne	28 June 1991 (aged 24)	39	12	(The Football Association) Manchester City
8	MF	Marouane Fellaini	22 November 1987 (aged 28)	68	15	(The Football Association) Manchester United
9	FW	Romelu Lukaku	13 May 1993 (aged 23)	44	12	(The Football Association) Everton
10	FW	Eden Hazard (captain)	7 January 1991 (aged 25)	65	13	(The Football Association) Chelsea
11	FW	Yannick Carrasco	4 September 1993 (aged 22)	4	0	(Royal Spanish Football Federation) Atlético Madrid
12	GK	Simon Mignolet	6 March 1988 (aged 28)	16	0	(The Football Association) Liverpool
13	GK	Jean-François Gillet	31 May 1979 (aged 37)	9	0	(Royal Belgian Football Association) Mechelen
14	FW	Dries Mertens	6 May 1987 (aged 29)	45	8	(Italian Football Federation) Napoli
15	DF	Jason Denayer	28 June 1995 (aged 20)	7	0	(Turkish Football Federation) Galatasaray
16	DF	Thomas Meunier	12 September 1991 (aged 24)	5	0	(Royal Belgian Football Association) Club Brugge
17	FW	Divock Origi	18 April 1995 (aged 21)	19	3	(The Football Association) Liverpool
18	DF	Christian Kabasele	24 February 1991 (aged 25)	0	0	(Royal Belgian Football Association) Genk
19	MF	Mousa Dembélé	16 July 1987 (aged 28)	65	5	(The Football Association) Tottenham Hotspur
20	FW	Christian Benteke	3 December 1990 (aged 25)	26	6	(The Football Association) Liverpool
21	DF	Jordan Lukaku	25 July 1994 (aged 21)	4	0	(Royal Belgian Football Association) Oostende
22	FW	Michy Batshuayi	2 October 1993 (aged 22)	5	2	(French Football Federation) Marseille
23	DF	Laurent Ciman	5 August 1985 (aged 30)	11	1	(Canadian Soccer Association) Montreal Impact

=== Italy ===
Manager: Antonio Conte

Italy announced their final squad on 31 May.

No.	Pos.	Player	Date of birth (age)	Caps	Goals	Club
1	GK	Gianluigi Buffon (captain)	28 January 1978 (aged 38)	157	0	(Italian Football Federation) Juventus
2	DF	Mattia De Sciglio	20 October 1992 (aged 23)	22	0	(Italian Football Federation) Milan
3	DF	Giorgio Chiellini	14 August 1984 (aged 31)	84	6	(Italian Football Federation) Juventus
4	DF	Matteo Darmian	2 December 1989 (aged 26)	22	1	(The Football Association) Manchester United
5	DF	Angelo Ogbonna	23 May 1988 (aged 28)	11	0	(The Football Association) West Ham United
6	MF	Antonio Candreva	28 February 1987 (aged 29)	38	4	(Italian Football Federation) Lazio
7	FW	Simone Zaza	25 June 1991 (aged 24)	11	1	(Italian Football Federation) Juventus
8	MF	Alessandro Florenzi	11 March 1991 (aged 25)	17	2	(Italian Football Federation) Roma
9	FW	Graziano Pellè	15 July 1985 (aged 30)	13	5	(The Football Association) Southampton
10	MF	Thiago Motta	28 August 1982 (aged 33)	26	1	(French Football Federation) Paris Saint-Germain
11	FW	Ciro Immobile	20 February 1990 (aged 26)	13	1	(Italian Football Federation) Torino
12	GK	Salvatore Sirigu	12 January 1987 (aged 29)	16	0	(French Football Federation) Paris Saint-Germain
13	GK	Federico Marchetti	7 February 1983 (aged 33)	11	0	(Italian Football Federation) Lazio
14	MF	Stefano Sturaro	9 March 1993 (aged 23)	1	0	(Italian Football Federation) Juventus
15	DF	Andrea Barzagli	8 May 1981 (aged 35)	56	0	(Italian Football Federation) Juventus
16	MF	Daniele De Rossi	24 July 1983 (aged 32)	103	18	(Italian Football Federation) Roma
17	FW	Éder	15 November 1986 (aged 29)	10	2	(Italian Football Federation) Internazionale
18	MF	Marco Parolo	25 January 1985 (aged 31)	20	0	(Italian Football Federation) Lazio
19	DF	Leonardo Bonucci	1 May 1987 (aged 29)	57	3	(Italian Football Federation) Juventus
20	FW	Lorenzo Insigne	4 June 1991 (aged 25)	9	2	(Italian Football Federation) Napoli
21	MF	Federico Bernardeschi	16 February 1994 (aged 22)	4	0	(Italian Football Federation) Fiorentina
22	MF	Stephan El Shaarawy	27 October 1992 (aged 23)	19	3	(Italian Football Federation) Roma
23	MF	Emanuele Giaccherini	5 May 1985 (aged 31)	25	3	(Italian Football Federation) Bologna

=== Republic of Ireland ===
Manager: (Northern Ireland) Martin O'Neill

Republic of Ireland announced their final squad on 31 May.

No.	Pos.	Player	Date of birth (age)	Caps	Goals	Club
1	GK	Keiren Westwood	23 October 1984 (aged 31)	18	0	(The Football Association) Sheffield Wednesday
2	DF	Séamus Coleman	11 October 1988 (aged 27)	34	0	(The Football Association) Everton
3	DF	Ciaran Clark	26 September 1989 (aged 26)	17	2	(The Football Association) Aston Villa
4	DF	John O'Shea	30 April 1981 (aged 35)	111	3	(The Football Association) Sunderland
5	DF	Richard Keogh	11 August 1986 (aged 29)	12	1	(The Football Association) Derby County
6	MF	Glenn Whelan	13 January 1984 (aged 32)	71	2	(The Football Association) Stoke City
7	MF	Aiden McGeady	4 April 1986 (aged 30)	82	5	(The Football Association) Sheffield Wednesday
8	MF	James McCarthy	12 November 1990 (aged 25)	35	0	(The Football Association) Everton
9	FW	Shane Long	22 January 1987 (aged 29)	63	16	(The Football Association) Southampton
10	FW	Robbie Keane (captain)	8 July 1980 (aged 35)	143	67	(United States Soccer Federation) LA Galaxy
11	MF	James McClean	22 April 1989 (aged 27)	38	5	(The Football Association) West Bromwich Albion
12	DF	Shane Duffy	1 January 1992 (aged 24)	3	0	(The Football Association) Blackburn Rovers
13	MF	Jeff Hendrick	31 January 1992 (aged 24)	21	0	(The Football Association) Derby County
14	FW	Jonathan Walters	20 September 1983 (aged 32)	39	10	(The Football Association) Stoke City
15	DF	Cyrus Christie	30 September 1992 (aged 23)	5	1	(The Football Association) Derby County
16	GK	Shay Given	20 April 1976 (aged 40)	134	0	(The Football Association) Stoke City
17	DF	Stephen Ward	20 August 1985 (aged 30)	33	3	(The Football Association) Burnley
18	MF	David Meyler	29 May 1989 (aged 27)	16	0	(The Football Association) Hull City
19	MF	Robbie Brady	14 January 1992 (aged 24)	23	4	(The Football Association) Norwich City
20	MF	Wes Hoolahan	20 May 1982 (aged 34)	30	2	(The Football Association) Norwich City
21	FW	Daryl Murphy	15 March 1983 (aged 33)	20	0	(The Football Association) Ipswich Town
22	MF	Stephen Quinn	4 April 1986 (aged 30)	15	0	(The Football Association) Reading
23	GK	Darren Randolph	12 May 1987 (aged 29)	9	0	(The Football Association) West Ham United

=== Sweden ===
Manager: Erik Hamrén

Sweden announced their final squad on 11 May.

No.	Pos.	Player	Date of birth (age)	Caps	Goals	Club
1	GK	Andreas Isaksson	3 October 1981 (aged 34)	130	0	(Turkish Football Federation) Kasımpaşa
2	DF	Mikael Lustig	13 December 1986 (aged 29)	52	3	(Scottish Football Association) Celtic
3	DF	Erik Johansson	30 December 1988 (aged 27)	9	0	(Danish Football Association) Copenhagen
4	DF	Andreas Granqvist	16 April 1985 (aged 31)	52	3	(Russian Football Union) Krasnodar
5	DF	Martin Olsson	17 May 1988 (aged 28)	35	5	(The Football Association) Norwich City
6	MF	Emil Forsberg	23 October 1991 (aged 24)	17	2	(German Football Association) RB Leipzig
7	MF	Sebastian Larsson	6 June 1985 (aged 31)	84	6	(The Football Association) Sunderland
8	MF	Albin Ekdal	28 July 1989 (aged 26)	22	0	(German Football Association) Hamburger SV
9	MF	Kim Källström	24 August 1982 (aged 33)	128	16	(Swiss Football Association) Grasshopper
10	FW	Zlatan Ibrahimović (captain)	3 October 1981 (aged 34)	113	62	(French Football Federation) Paris Saint-Germain
11	FW	Marcus Berg	17 August 1986 (aged 29)	38	10	(Hellenic Football Federation) Panathinaikos
12	GK	Robin Olsen	8 January 1990 (aged 26)	4	0	(Danish Football Association) Copenhagen
13	DF	Pontus Jansson	13 February 1991 (aged 25)	8	0	(Italian Football Federation) Torino
14	DF	Victor Lindelöf	17 July 1994 (aged 21)	3	0	(Portuguese Football Federation) Benfica
15	MF	Oscar Hiljemark	28 June 1992 (aged 23)	10	1	(Italian Football Federation) Palermo
16	MF	Pontus Wernbloom	25 June 1986 (aged 29)	51	2	(Russian Football Union) CSKA Moscow
17	DF	Ludwig Augustinsson	21 April 1994 (aged 22)	4	0	(Danish Football Association) Copenhagen
18	MF	Oscar Lewicki	14 July 1992 (aged 23)	10	0	(Swedish Football Association) Malmö FF
19	FW	Emir Kujović	22 June 1988 (aged 27)	4	1	(Swedish Football Association) IFK Norrköping
20	FW	John Guidetti	15 April 1992 (aged 24)	9	1	(Royal Spanish Football Federation) Celta Vigo
21	MF	Jimmy Durmaz	22 March 1989 (aged 27)	32	2	(Hellenic Football Federation) Olympiacos
22	MF	Erkan Zengin	5 August 1985 (aged 30)	20	3	(Turkish Football Federation) Trabzonspor
23	GK	Patrik Carlgren	8 January 1992 (aged 24)	1	0	(Swedish Football Association) AIK

== Group F ==
=== Portugal ===
Manager: Fernando Santos

Portugal announced their final squad on 17 May.

No.	Pos.	Player	Date of birth (age)	Caps	Goals	Club
1	GK	Rui Patrício	15 February 1988 (aged 28)	45	0	(Portuguese Football Federation) Sporting CP
2	DF	Bruno Alves	27 November 1981 (aged 34)	85	10	(Turkish Football Federation) Fenerbahçe
3	DF	Pepe	26 February 1983 (aged 33)	71	3	(Royal Spanish Football Federation) Real Madrid
4	DF	José Fonte	22 December 1983 (aged 32)	12	0	(The Football Association) Southampton
5	DF	Raphaël Guerreiro	22 December 1993 (aged 22)	7	2	(French Football Federation) Lorient
6	DF	Ricardo Carvalho	18 May 1978 (aged 38)	86	5	(French Football Federation) Monaco
7	FW	Cristiano Ronaldo (captain)	5 February 1985 (aged 31)	126	58	(Royal Spanish Football Federation) Real Madrid
8	MF	João Moutinho	8 September 1986 (aged 29)	84	4	(French Football Federation) Monaco
9	FW	Eder	22 December 1987 (aged 28)	26	3	(French Football Federation) Lille
10	MF	João Mário	19 January 1993 (aged 23)	11	0	(Portuguese Football Federation) Sporting CP
11	MF	Vieirinha	24 January 1986 (aged 30)	22	1	(German Football Association) VfL Wolfsburg
12	GK	Anthony Lopes	1 October 1990 (aged 25)	4	0	(French Football Federation) Lyon
13	MF	Danilo	9 September 1991 (aged 24)	12	1	(Portuguese Football Federation) Porto
14	MF	William Carvalho	7 April 1992 (aged 24)	20	0	(Portuguese Football Federation) Sporting CP
15	MF	André Gomes	30 July 1993 (aged 22)	8	0	(Royal Spanish Football Federation) Valencia
16	MF	Renato Sanches	18 August 1997 (aged 18)	5	0	(Portuguese Football Federation) Benfica
17	FW	Nani	17 November 1986 (aged 29)	96	17	(Turkish Football Federation) Fenerbahçe
18	MF	Rafa Silva	17 May 1993 (aged 23)	8	0	(Portuguese Football Federation) Braga
19	DF	Eliseu	1 October 1983 (aged 32)	16	1	(Portuguese Football Federation) Benfica
20	FW	Ricardo Quaresma	26 September 1983 (aged 32)	50	7	(Turkish Football Federation) Beşiktaş
21	DF	Cédric	31 August 1991 (aged 24)	11	0	(The Football Association) Southampton
22	GK	Eduardo	19 September 1982 (aged 33)	35	0	(Croatian Football Federation) Dinamo Zagreb
23	MF	Adrien Silva	15 March 1989 (aged 27)	9	0	(Portuguese Football Federation) Sporting CP

=== Iceland ===
Managers: Heimir Hallgrímsson & (Sweden) Lars Lagerbäck

Iceland announced their final squad on 9 May.

No.	Pos.	Player	Date of birth (age)	Caps	Goals	Club
1	GK	Hannes Þór Halldórsson	27 April 1984 (aged 32)	33	0	(Norwegian Football Federation) Bodø/Glimt
2	DF	Birkir Már Sævarsson	11 November 1984 (aged 31)	57	1	(Swedish Football Association) Hammarby IF
3	DF	Haukur Heiðar Hauksson	1 September 1991 (aged 24)	7	0	(Swedish Football Association) AIK
4	DF	Hjörtur Hermannsson	8 February 1995 (aged 21)	3	0	(Swedish Football Association) IFK Göteborg
5	DF	Sverrir Ingi Ingason	5 August 1993 (aged 22)	6	2	(Royal Belgian Football Association) Lokeren
6	DF	Ragnar Sigurðsson	19 June 1986 (aged 29)	56	1	(Russian Football Union) Krasnodar
7	MF	Jóhann Berg Guðmundsson	27 October 1990 (aged 25)	47	5	(The Football Association) Charlton Athletic
8	MF	Birkir Bjarnason	27 May 1988 (aged 28)	47	6	(Swiss Football Association) Basel
9	FW	Kolbeinn Sigþórsson	14 March 1990 (aged 26)	39	20	(French Football Federation) Nantes
10	MF	Gylfi Sigurðsson	8 September 1989 (aged 26)	39	13	(Football Association of Wales) Swansea City
11	FW	Alfreð Finnbogason	1 February 1989 (aged 27)	34	8	(German Football Association) FC Augsburg
12	GK	Ögmundur Kristinsson	19 June 1989 (aged 26)	11	0	(Swedish Football Association) Hammarby IF
13	GK	Ingvar Jónsson	18 October 1989 (aged 26)	5	0	(Norwegian Football Federation) Sandefjord
14	DF	Kári Árnason	13 October 1982 (aged 33)	47	2	(Swedish Football Association) Malmö FF
15	FW	Jón Daði Böðvarsson	25 May 1992 (aged 24)	21	1	(German Football Association) 1. FC Kaiserslautern
16	MF	Rúnar Már Sigurjónsson	18 June 1990 (aged 25)	11	1	(Swedish Football Association) GIF Sundsvall
17	MF	Aron Gunnarsson (captain)	22 April 1989 (aged 27)	59	2	(Football Association of Wales) Cardiff City
18	MF	Theódór Elmar Bjarnason	4 March 1987 (aged 29)	27	0	(Danish Football Association) AGF
19	DF	Hörður Björgvin Magnússon	11 February 1993 (aged 23)	5	0	(Italian Football Federation) Cesena
20	MF	Emil Hallfreðsson	29 June 1984 (aged 31)	54	1	(Italian Football Federation) Udinese
21	MF	Arnór Ingvi Traustason	30 April 1993 (aged 23)	7	3	(Swedish Football Association) IFK Norrköping
22	FW	Eiður Guðjohnsen	15 September 1978 (aged 37)	86	26	(Norwegian Football Federation) Molde
23	DF	Ari Freyr Skúlason	14 May 1987 (aged 29)	38	0	(Danish Football Association) OB

=== Austria ===
Manager: (Switzerland) Marcel Koller

Austria announced their final squad on 31 May.

No.	Pos.	Player	Date of birth (age)	Caps	Goals	Club
1	GK	Robert Almer	20 March 1984 (aged 32)	28	0	(Austrian Football Association) Austria Wien
2	DF	György Garics	8 March 1984 (aged 32)	41	2	(German Football Association) Darmstadt 98
3	DF	Aleksandar Dragović	6 March 1991 (aged 25)	47	1	(Ukrainian Association of Football) Dynamo Kyiv
4	DF	Martin Hinteregger	7 September 1992 (aged 23)	14	0	(German Football Association) Borussia Mönchengladbach
5	DF	Christian Fuchs (captain)	7 April 1986 (aged 30)	75	1	(The Football Association) Leicester City
6	MF	Stefan Ilsanker	18 May 1989 (aged 27)	16	0	(German Football Association) RB Leipzig
7	FW	Marko Arnautović	19 April 1989 (aged 27)	52	11	(The Football Association) Stoke City
8	DF	David Alaba	24 June 1992 (aged 23)	46	11	(German Football Association) Bayern Munich
9	FW	Rubin Okotie	6 June 1987 (aged 29)	17	2	(German Football Association) 1860 Munich
10	MF	Zlatko Junuzović	26 September 1987 (aged 28)	48	7	(German Football Association) Werder Bremen
11	MF	Martin Harnik	10 June 1987 (aged 29)	58	14	(German Football Association) VfB Stuttgart
12	GK	Heinz Lindner	17 July 1990 (aged 25)	8	0	(German Football Association) Eintracht Frankfurt
13	DF	Markus Suttner	16 April 1987 (aged 29)	16	0	(German Football Association) Ingolstadt 04
14	MF	Julian Baumgartlinger	2 January 1988 (aged 28)	45	1	(German Football Association) Mainz 05
15	DF	Sebastian Prödl	21 June 1987 (aged 28)	57	4	(The Football Association) Watford
16	DF	Kevin Wimmer	15 November 1992 (aged 23)	3	0	(The Football Association) Tottenham Hotspur
17	DF	Florian Klein	17 November 1986 (aged 29)	37	0	(German Football Association) VfB Stuttgart
18	MF	Alessandro Schöpf	7 February 1994 (aged 22)	4	1	(German Football Association) Schalke 04
19	FW	Lukas Hinterseer	28 March 1991 (aged 25)	10	0	(German Football Association) Ingolstadt 04
20	MF	Marcel Sabitzer	17 March 1994 (aged 22)	18	3	(German Football Association) RB Leipzig
21	FW	Marc Janko	25 June 1983 (aged 32)	54	26	(Swiss Football Association) Basel
22	MF	Jakob Jantscher	8 January 1989 (aged 27)	22	1	(Swiss Football Association) Luzern
23	GK	Ramazan Özcan	28 June 1984 (aged 31)	7	0	(German Football Association) Ingolstadt 04

=== Hungary ===
Manager: (Germany) Bernd Storck

Hungary announced their final squad on 31 May.

No.	Pos.	Player	Date of birth (age)	Caps	Goals	Club
1	GK	Gábor Király	1 April 1976 (aged 40)	103	0	(Hungarian Football Federation) Haladás
2	DF	Ádám Lang	17 January 1993 (aged 23)	11	0	(Hungarian Football Federation) Videoton
3	DF	Mihály Korhut	1 December 1988 (aged 27)	4	0	(Hungarian Football Federation) Debrecen
4	DF	Tamás Kádár	14 March 1990 (aged 26)	30	0	(Polish Football Association) Lech Poznań
5	DF	Attila Fiola	17 February 1990 (aged 26)	15	0	(Hungarian Football Federation) Puskás Akadémia
6	MF	Ákos Elek	21 July 1988 (aged 27)	38	1	(Hungarian Football Federation) Diósgyőri VTK
7	MF	Balázs Dzsudzsák (captain)	23 December 1986 (aged 29)	78	18	(Turkish Football Federation) Bursaspor
8	MF	Ádám Nagy	17 June 1995 (aged 20)	8	0	(Hungarian Football Federation) Ferencváros
9	FW	Ádám Szalai	9 December 1987 (aged 28)	32	8	(German Football Association) Hannover 96
10	MF	Zoltán Gera	22 April 1979 (aged 37)	89	24	(Hungarian Football Federation) Ferencváros
11	FW	Krisztián Németh	5 January 1989 (aged 27)	24	3	(Qatar Football Association) Al-Gharafa
12	GK	Dénes Dibusz	16 November 1990 (aged 25)	4	0	(Hungarian Football Federation) Ferencváros
13	FW	Dániel Böde	24 October 1986 (aged 29)	12	4	(Hungarian Football Federation) Ferencváros
14	MF	Gergő Lovrencsics	1 September 1988 (aged 27)	12	1	(Polish Football Association) Lech Poznań
15	MF	László Kleinheisler	8 April 1994 (aged 22)	5	1	(German Football Association) Werder Bremen
16	MF	Ádám Pintér	12 June 1988 (aged 27)	21	0	(Hungarian Football Federation) Ferencváros
17	FW	Nemanja Nikolić	31 December 1987 (aged 28)	18	3	(Polish Football Association) Legia Warsaw
18	MF	Zoltán Stieber	16 October 1988 (aged 27)	12	2	(German Football Association) 1. FC Nürnberg
19	FW	Tamás Priskin	27 September 1986 (aged 29)	56	17	(Slovak Football Association) Slovan Bratislava
20	DF	Richárd Guzmics	16 April 1987 (aged 29)	14	1	(Polish Football Association) Wisła Kraków
21	DF	Barnabás Bese	6 May 1994 (aged 22)	1	0	(Hungarian Football Federation) MTK Budapest
22	GK	Péter Gulácsi	6 May 1990 (aged 26)	3	0	(German Football Association) RB Leipzig
23	DF	Roland Juhász	1 July 1983 (aged 32)	91	6	(Hungarian Football Federation) Videoton

== Player representation ==
=== By age ===
==== Players ====
- Oldest: (Hungary) Gábor Király (40 years, 70 days)
- Youngest: (England) Marcus Rashford (18 years, 223 days)

==== Goalkeepers ====
- Oldest: (Hungary) Gábor Király (40 years, 70 days)
- Youngest: (Spain) Sergio Rico (22 years, 283 days)

==== Captains ====
- Oldest: (Italy) Gianluigi Buffon (38 years, 134 days)
- Youngest: (Belgium) Eden Hazard (25 years, 155 days)

==== Coaches ====
- Oldest: (England) Roy Hodgson (68 years, 306 days)
- Youngest: (Russia) Leonid Slutsky (45 years, 37 days)

=== By club ===
Players	Clubs
12	(England) Liverpool (Italy) Juventus
11	(England) Tottenham Hotspur
10	(England) Manchester United
9	(Germany) Bayern Munich (Spain) Barcelona (Turkey) Fenerbahçe
8	(England) Arsenal (Russia) CSKA Moscow (Spain) Real Madrid (Switzerland) Basel
7	(England) Southampton (Italy) Roma (Russia) Zenit Saint Petersburg (Turkey) Beşiktaş (Ukraine) Dynamo Kyiv (Ukraine) Shakhtar Donetsk
6	(Croatia) Dinamo Zagreb (Czech Republic) Viktoria Plzeň (England) Chelsea (England) Everton (England) Manchester City (Hungary) Ferencváros (Italy) Napoli
5	(England) Stoke City (Germany) Bayer Leverkusen (Germany) Borussia Dortmund (Italy) Fiorentina (Poland) Legia Warsaw (Russia) Krasnodar (Russia) Lokomotiv Moscow (Turkey) Bursaspor (Turkey) Galatasaray
4	(Czech Republic) Sparta Prague (England) Leicester City (England) Reading (England) Watford (England) West Bromwich Albion (England) West Ham United (France) Paris Saint-Germain (Germany) Borussia Mönchengladbach (Germany) RB Leipzig (Germany) Schalke 04 (Germany) VfL Wolfsburg (Italy) Lazio (Portugal) Sporting CP (Romania) Steaua București (Spain) Atlético Madrid (Spain) Sevilla (Wales) Swansea City
3	(Bulgaria) Ludogorets Razgrad (Croatia) Rijeka (Denmark) Copenhagen (England) Burnley (England) Crystal Palace (England) Derby County (England) Norwich City (England) Sheffield Wednesday (France) Lyon (France) Monaco (France) Nantes (France) Rennes (Germany) 1. FC Köln (Germany) Mainz 05 (Germany) 1899 Hoffenheim (Germany) Ingolstadt 04 (Germany) Werder Bremen (Italy) Inter Milan (Italy) Torino (Poland) Lech Poznań (Portugal) Benfica (Romania) Astra Giurgiu (Slovakia) Slovan Bratislava (Turkey) Kasımpaşa (Ukraine) Dnipro Dnipropetrovsk (Ukraine) Zorya Luhansk
2	(England) Birmingham City (England) Blackburn Rovers (England) Fulham (England) Milton Keynes Dons (England) Nottingham Forest (England) Sunderland (France) Marseille (Germany) Eintracht Frankfurt (Germany) FC Augsburg (Germany) Hamburger SV (Germany) Hertha BSC (Germany) VfB Stuttgart (Greece) PAOK (Hungary) Videoton (Italy) Milan (Italy) Palermo (Poland) Lechia Gdańsk (Poland) Wisła Kraków (Portugal) Porto (Qatar) Al-Gharafa (Russia) Spartak Moscow (Scotland) Aberdeen (Spain) Athletic Bilbao (Spain) Celta Vigo (Spain) Valencia (Sweden) AIK (Sweden) Hammarby IF (Sweden) IFK Norrköping (Sweden) Malmö FF (Switzerland) Grasshopper (Switzerland) Young Boys (Turkey) Gençlerbirliği (Turkey) İstanbul Başakşehir (Turkey) Trabzonspor
1	(Albania) Partizani (Albania) Skënderbeu Korçë (Australia) Melbourne City; Austria Wien; Rapid Wien (Azerbaijan) Qarabağ (Belgium) Club Brugge (Belgium) Genk (Belgium) Lokeren (Belgium) Mechelen (Belgium) Oostende (Canada) Montreal Impact (China) Beijing Guoan (Croatia) Hajduk Split (Czech Republic) Jablonec (Czech Republic) Slavia Prague (Czech Republic) Slovan Liberec (Denmark) AGF (Denmark) Nordsjælland (Denmark) OB (England) Bournemouth (England) Aston Villa (England) Brighton & Hove Albion (England) Charlton Athletic (England) Doncaster Rovers (England) Fleetwood Town (England) Gillingham (England) Hull City (England) Ipswich Town (England) Leeds United (England) Millwall (England) Newcastle United (England) Notts County (England) Queens Park Rangers (England) Wigan Athletic (England) Wolverhampton Wanderers (France) Bordeaux (France) Lille (France) Lorient (France) Toulouse (Germany) 1860 Munich (Germany) 1. FC Kaiserslautern (Germany) 1. FC Nürnberg (Germany) Darmstadt 98 (Germany) Hannover 96 (Germany) SC Freiburg (Greece) Olympiacos (Greece) Panathinaikos (Greece) PAS Giannina (Hungary) Debrecen (Hungary) Diósgyőri VTK (Hungary) Haladás (Hungary) MTK Budapest (Hungary) Puskás Akadémia (Israel) Hapoel Be'er Sheva (Italy) Bologna (Italy) Cagliari (Italy) Cesena (Italy) Como (Italy) Empoli (Italy) Frosinone (Italy) Genoa (Italy) Pescara (Italy) Sampdoria (Italy) Sassuolo (Italy) Udinese (Kazakhstan) FC Kairat (Liechtenstein) Vaduz (Mexico) UANL (Netherlands) Ajax (Netherlands) Willem II (Norway) Bodø/Glimt (Norway) Molde (Norway) Sandefjord (Poland) Cracovia (Poland) Ruch Chorzów (Poland) Zagłębie Lubin (Portugal) Braga (Qatar) Al-Sailiya (Romania) Dinamo București (Romania) Pandurii Târgu Jiu (Russia) Amkar Perm (Russia) Dynamo Moscow (Russia) Kuban Krasnodar (Russia) Terek Grozny (Russia) Ufa (Saudi Arabia) Al-Ittihad (Scotland) Celtic (Scotland) Hamilton Academical (Scotland) Inverness Caledonian Thistle (Scotland) Kilmarnock (Scotland) St Johnstone (Slovakia) Žilina (Spain) Córdoba (Spain) Málaga (Spain) Rayo Vallecano (Spain) Villarreal (Sweden) GIF Sundsvall (Sweden) IFK Göteborg (Switzerland) Lugano (Switzerland) Luzern (Switzerland) Zürich (Turkey) Osmanlıspor (United States) Colorado Rapids (United States) LA Galaxy (Wales) Cardiff City

=== By club nationality ===
Key
Bold	Nation represented at the tournament
Italic	Nation not a UEFA member

Players	Clubs
135	**England**
66	**Germany**
55	**Italy**
36	**Turkey**
35	**Spain**
33	**Russia**
22	**France**
20	**Ukraine**
15	**Poland**; **Switzerland**
13	**Czech Republic**; **Hungary**
10	**Croatia**; **Portugal**; **Sweden**
9	**Romania**
7	Scotland
6	Denmark
5	**Belgium**; Greece; **Wales**
4	**Slovakia**
3	Bulgaria; Norway; Qatar
2	**Albania**; **Austria**; Netherlands; United States
1	Australia; Azerbaijan; Canada; China; Israel; Kazakhstan; Liechtenstein; Mexico; Saudi Arabia

The above table is the same when it comes to league representation, with only the following exceptions:

- The English league system has 139 representatives, including five players from Wales-based Cardiff City and Swansea City.
- The Swiss league system has 16 representatives, including one player from Liechtenstein-based Vaduz.
- The American league system has 3 representatives, including one player from Canada-based Montreal Impact.

Only England had all its players from the nation's club teams. Iceland, Northern Ireland, and the Republic of Ireland had none of their players from the respective nation's club teams.
