= Tamás Priskin =

Hungarian footballer (born 1986)

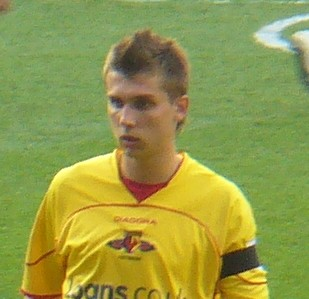
- Priskin with Watford in 2007

Personal information
- Full name: Tamás Priskin
- Date of birth: 27 September 1986 (age 40)
- Place of birth: Komárno, Czechoslovakia
- Height: 1.85 m (6 ft 1 in)
- Position: Forward

Youth career
- 1996–2001: Komárno
- 2001–2003: Győri ETO

Senior career*
Years	Team	Apps	(Gls)
2003–2006	Győri ETO	67	(24)
2006–2009	Watford	68	(15)
2008	→ Preston North End (loan)	5	(2)
2009–2012	Ipswich Town	51	(5)
2010	→ Queens Park Rangers (loan)	13	(1)
2011	→ Swansea City (loan)	4	(1)
2011–2012	→ Derby County (loan)	5	(1)
2012–2014	Alania Vladikavkaz	35	(14)
2014	Austria Wien	0	(0)
2014	→ Maccabi Haifa (loan)	11	(1)
2014–2015	Győri ETO	27	(11)
2015–2017	Slovan Bratislava	51	(22)
2017–2020	Ferencváros	19	(4)
2018–2019	→ Haladás (loan)	21	(7)
2020–2023	Győri ETO	81	(32)
2020	→ ETO Academy	2	(4)
2023–2025	Göstling	0	(0)
2025–2026	Gyirmót FC II	4	(3)
Total		460	(144)

International career
2005–2006	Hungary U21	6	(2)
2005–2017	Hungary	63	(17)
- * Club domestic league appearances and goals

Tamás Priskin (Hungarian: [ˈpriʃkin ˈtɒmaːʃ]; born 27 September 1986) is a Hungarian former professional footballer who played as a striker.

He spent most of his career in England, with Watford and Ipswich Town. His first season on arrival in 2006 was in the Premier League, and he spent the remainder in the Championship. Since his release from Ipswich in January 2012, Priskin has played in brief stints in Russia, Austria, Israel, Hungary and Slovakia.

A full international since 2005, Priskin has 63 caps and 17 international goals for Hungary.

== Early life ==
Priskin was born in Komárno in Czechoslovakia to ethnic Hungarian parents. He joined the youth club of Győri ETO FC when he was 15 years old and received Hungarian citizenship in 2005 in addition to his Slovak passport. He is the elder brother of Győri ETO FC striker Imre Vankó.

== Club career ==
=== Győr ===
Priskin made his debut for Győri ETO FC in the first Hungarian League on 23 April 2003 at the age of 16 years and 7 months. On 9 August 2006 he completed a move to Premier League club Watford on a four-year deal after impressing during a trial period, for an undisclosed fee.

=== Watford ===
==== 2006–07 season ====
Priskin made his debut for Watford ten days after signing as they opened the season away at Everton. After coming on in the 79th minute for Darius Henderson, he set up Damien Francis, who scored the consolation in a 2–1 defeat at Goodison Park. His first goal for the club came on 24 October in a League Cup third round tie against Hull City at Vicarage Road, exploiting a Ryan France error to net the second in a 2–1 win for Watford's first normal-time victory of the season.

He made his first start on 30 December, lining up against Wigan Athletic on 30 December due to an injury to Hamer Bouazza. A minute before half time, he equalised by heading in Jordan Stewart's cross for his first Premier League goal, but referee Steve Tanner abandoned the match in the 56th minute due to heavy rain, and the match was made void. In a goalless draw away to Fulham two days later, Priskin was sent off by referee Steve Bennett six minutes into stoppage time for two yellow cards.

Priskin's first official Premier League goal came on 9 April 2007 in a 4–2 win against Portsmouth at Vicarage Road, netting the third of the game in the 50th minute from Steve Kabba's cross. He scored a second twelve days later against Manchester City on 21 April, equalising in the 75th minute from Douglas Rinaldi's pass for a 1–1 home draw, which nonetheless saw his team relegated.

==== 2007–08 season ====
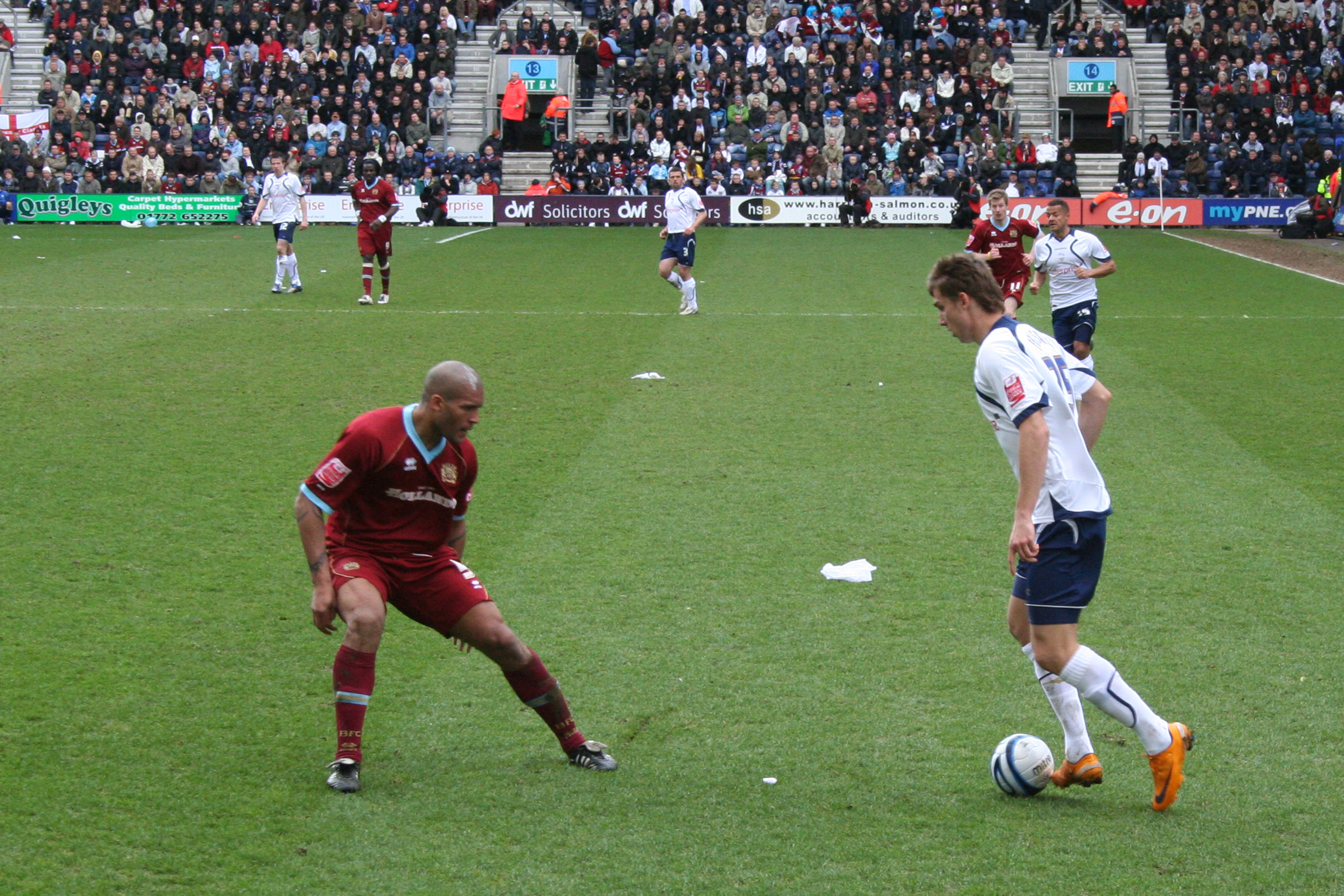
Priskin (right), attacking against Burnley's Clarke Carlisle, for Preston in 2008

With Watford back in the Championship in 2007–08 following relegation, Priskin only made sparse appearances, being kept out of the side by Marlon King, Henderson and new signing Nathan Ellington.

On 8 March 2008, having not played a league game for three months, Priskin signed on a month-long loan at fellow Championship team Preston North End, making his debut as a starter on the same day in a 2–1 win away at Charlton Athletic. He scored his first goal for Preston to open a home win of the same margin against Lancashire rivals Burnley two weeks later. In his last of five Preston matches, at Queens Park Rangers on 5 April, he came on at half-time for goalscorer Neil Mellor to double Preston's lead, but they conceded two added-time goals for a 2–2 draw. He returned to Watford at the end of the loan, playing more regularly than before and featuring as a substitute in both legs of their 1–6 aggregate defeat to Hull in the play-off semi-finals.

==== 2008–09 season ====
Priskin's first goals of the season came on 18 October, two first-half strikes in a 3–0 win at Southampton. Three days later, in a home match against Cardiff City, Watford were 2–0 up when Priskin was sent off in the 29th minute for attacking Darren Purse, and eventually drew 2–2.

He also scored goals against Premier League sides Tottenham Hotspur in the League Cup and Chelsea in the FA Cup – the latter only two minutes after coming onto the pitch – although both games ended in a Watford defeat. On 27 January 2009, he replaced Will Hoskins in the 76th minute against Burnley and again scored within two minutes of entering the pitch, scoring a second in added time for a 3–0 home win. His improved performances came from November onwards under new manager Brendan Rodgers – during this time he scored most of his goals, established himself in the side, and became well known for his skill, pace, and deadly finishing.

=== Ipswich Town ===
==== 2009–10 season ====
However, Priskin's future at Watford remained in doubt, as he declined signing a new contract at the club. On 6 August 2009, Priskin joined Ipswich Town for an undisclosed fee believed to be in the region of £1.7 million. His first competitive goal for Ipswich came when he scored in a 2–1 League Cup second round 2–1 defeat at Peterborough United nineteen days after signing, later having a penalty saved by Joe Lewis. His only league goal of the season came in a 3–3 away draw against Doncaster Rovers on 19 September, nine minutes after entering as a substitute for Jonathan Walters.

In February 2010 Priskin went on loan to Queens Park Rangers. His only goal in 13 games came in a 2–2 draw away to his former club Preston on 27 March, equalising for a 2–2 draw on the edge of the penalty area after being set up by Adel Taarabt.

==== 2010–11 season ====
On 12 January 2011 he scored the only goal in a 1–0 win for Ipswich Town over Arsenal in their League Cup semi-final first leg match. In March 2011, Priskin joined Swansea City on loan until the end of the season. He returned to Ipswich, injured, in late-April.

==== 2011–12 season ====
He was again loaned out in November 2011, when he joined Derby County on a six-week deal. Just two days after arriving at the club, he scored his side's only goal in a 3–1 away defeat to West Ham United. On 2 January 2012, it was confirmed that Priskin would return to Ipswich at the end of his loan spell; On 17 January 2012, Priskin was released from his contract at Ipswich Town.

=== Alania Vladikavkaz ===
On 19 January 2012, Priskin signed a three-and-a-half-year contract with Football National League side Alania Vladikavkaz. He made his debut on 12 March 2012 against FC Torpedo Moscow, scoring the lone goal in a 1–0 victory over the capital team. On 21 July 2012 Priskin debuted in the Russian Premier League for the first time after spending six months in the Football National League however his team lost Spartak Moscow 2–1 at home. On 17 November 2013, Priskin ended his contract with Alania and left the club.

=== Spring of 2014 ===
Austria Wien signed him during the winter transfer market of 2014. However, the team didn't counted with Priskin at the team, so he went immediately on loan to Maccabi Haifa with the same transfer for a half year. In 11 matches, he scored one goal.

=== Back to Győr ===
After his performance at loan, Austria didn't want to keep the player, therefore he moved back to Győri ETO after eight years. The fans were happy about his arrival, even though he didn't really found himself on the first matches. In March 2015, the owner and main sponsor of the Győr filed for bankruptcy, which relegated the club to the third tier of the Hungarian football league system. Even though the conditions weren't the finest, Priskin played the whole season at the club. He scored 11 goals in 27 matches.

=== Ferencváros ===
On 1 June 2017, Priskin was signed by Nemzeti Bajnokság I club Ferencvárosi TC.

On 16 June 2020, he became champion with Ferencváros by beating Budapest Honvéd FC at the Hidegkuti Nándor Stadion on the 30th match day of the 2019–20 Nemzeti Bajnokság I season.

== International career ==
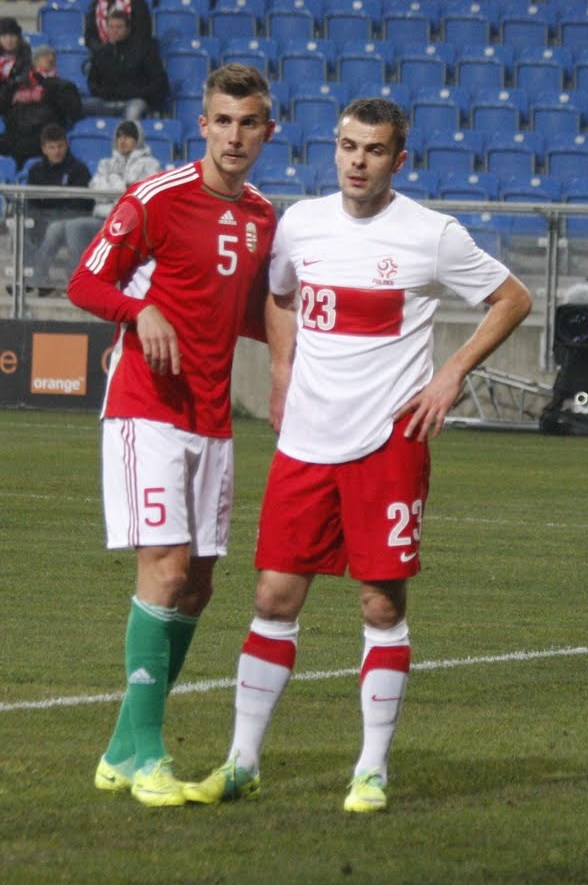
Tamás Priskin and Poland's Paweł Brożek in 2011

Priskin played for Ferenc Puskás XI against Real Madrid on 14 August 2005 in an unofficial match. He officially made his international debut for Hungary three days later, replacing Péter Halmosi for the final 21 minutes of a 1–2 friendly defeat against Argentina at the Ferenc Puskás Stadium in Budapest. His greatest success with the national team came in late 2006 and early 2007, when he managed to score in five consecutive international games, a performance unseen in Hungary since the days of legendary players like Puskás or Ferenc Bene.

Due to his good performances for Watford towards the end of the 2008–09 he earned a recall to the Hungary squad for the FIFA World Cup qualifiers against Albania and Malta.

On 7 September 2012, as Hungary started 2014 FIFA World Cup qualification with a 5–0 win in Andorra, Priskin scored the fourth goal.

On 5 June 2015, he scored the 4th goal for Hungary against Lithuania in the 30th minute, 35 seconds after teammate Nemanja Nikolić had scored.

On 15 November 2015, he scored the first goal in the second leg of the UEFA Euro 2016 qualifying play-offs against Norway. Priskin was called up in Hungary's UEFA Euro 2016 squad.

On 14 June 2016, Priskin played in the first group match in a 2–0 victory over Austria at the UEFA Euro 2016 Group F match at Nouveau Stade de Bordeaux, Bordeaux, France. Three days later on 18 June 2016 he played in a 1–1 draw against Iceland at the Stade Vélodrome, Marseille.

== Career statistics ==
=== Club ===
As of matches played 4 December 2019

Appearances and goals by club, season and competition
Club	Season	League			National Cup		League Cup		Europe		Total	
Club	Season	Division	Apps	Goals	Apps	Goals	Apps	Goals	Apps	Goals	Apps	Goals
Győri ETO	2002–03	Nemzeti Bajnokság I	3	0	0	0	0	0	0	0	3	0
Győri ETO	2003–04	Nemzeti Bajnokság I	14	5	0	0	0	0	0	0	14	5
Győri ETO	2004–05	Nemzeti Bajnokság I	26	8	0	0	0	0	0	0	26	8
Győri ETO	2005–06	Nemzeti Bajnokság I	25	11	0	0	0	0	0	0	25	11
Győri ETO	Total		68	24	0	0	0	0	0	0	68	24
Watford	2006–07	Premier League	16	2	3	0	3	1	0	0	22	3
Watford	2007–08	Championship	16	1	2	0	2	1	0	0	20	2
Watford	2008–09	Championship	36	12	2	1	3	1	0	0	41	14
Watford	Total		68	15	7	1	8	3	0	0	83	19
Preston North End (loan)	2007–08	Championship	5	2	0	0	0	0	0	0	5	2
Ipswich Town	2009–10	Championship	17	1	1	0	1	1	0	0	19	2
Ipswich Town	2010–11	Championship	32	4	1	0	6	3	0	0	39	7
Ipswich Town	2011–12	Championship	2	0	0	0	0	0	0	0	2	0
Ipswich Town	Total		51	5	2	0	7	4	0	0	60	9
Queens Park Rangers (loan)	2009–10	Championship	13	1	0	0	0	0	0	0	13	1
Swansea City (loan)	2010–11	Championship	4	1	0	0	0	0	0	0	4	1
Derby County (loan)	2011–12	Championship	5	1	0	0	0	0	0	0	5	1
Alania	2011–12	Russian Football National League	6	2	0	0	0	0	0	0	6	2
Alania	2012–13	Russian Premier League	23	5	0	0	0	0	0	0	23	5
Alania	2013–14	Russian Football National League	6	7	1	0	0	0	0	0	7	7
Alania	Total		35	14	1	0	0	0	0	0	36	14
Maccabi Haifa	2013–14	Israeli Premier League	11	1	0	0	0	0	0	0	11	1
Győri ETO	2014–15	Nemzeti Bajnokság I	27	11	1	0	1	0	0	0	29	11
Slovan Bratislava	2015–16	Slovak Super Liga	26	11	3	2	0	0	3 (Note: Appearance(s) in UEFA Europa League)	1	32	14
Slovan Bratislava	2016–17	Slovak Super Liga	25	10	5	3	0	0	1	0	31	13
Slovan Bratislava	Total		51	21	8	5	0	0	4	1	63	27
Ferencváros	2017–18	Nemzeti Bajnokság I	17	4	1	0	0	0	4	1	22	5
Ferencváros	2018–19	Nemzeti Bajnokság I	0	0	0	0	0	0	0	0	0	0
Ferencváros	2019–20	Nemzeti Bajnokság I	2	0	3	0	0	0	3 (Note: Two appearances in UEFA Champions League, one in UEFA Europa League)	0	8	0
Ferencváros	Total		19	4	4	0	0	0	7	1	30	5
Szombathelyi Haladás (loan)	2018–19	Nemzeti Bajnokság I	21	7	0	0	0	0	0	0	21	7
Győri ETO	2019–20	Nemzeti Bajnokság II	3	1	0	0	0	0	0	0	3	1
Career total			381	108	23	6	16	7	11	2	431	123

=== International ===
Appearances and goals by national team and year
National team	Year	Apps	Goals
Hungary	2005	3	0
Hungary	2006	1	1
Hungary	2007	11	5
Hungary	2008	3	1
Hungary	2009	6	0
Hungary	2010	6	1
Hungary	2011	8	3
Hungary	2012	3	1
Hungary	2013	1	0
Hungary	2014	5	3
Hungary	2015	7	2
Hungary	2016	6	0
Hungary	2017	3	0
Total		63	17

Scores and results list Hungary's goal tally first, score column indicates score after each Priskin goal.

List of international goals scored by Tamás Priskin
No.	Date	Venue	Opponent	Score	Result	Competition
1	15 November 2006	Sóstói Stadion, Székesfehérvár, Hungary	Canada	1–0	1–0	Friendly
2	6 February 2007	Tsirio Stadium, Limassol, Cyprus	Cyprus	1–2	1–2	Friendly
3	7 February 2007	Tsirio Stadium, Limassol, Cyprus	Latvia	1–0	2–0	Friendly
4	7 February 2007	Tsirio Stadium, Limassol, Cyprus	Latvia	2–0	2–0	Friendly
5	24 March 2007	Podgorica City Stadium, Podgorica, Montenegro	Montenegro	1–0	2–1	Friendly
6	28 March 2007	Ferenc Szusza Stadium, Budapest, Hungary	Moldova	1–0	2–0	UEFA Euro 2008 Qualification
7	20 August 2008	Ferenc Puskás Stadium, Budapest, Hungary	Montenegro	1–0	3–3	Friendly
8	17 November 2010	Sóstói Stadion, Székesfehérvár, Hungary	Lithuania	1–0	2–0	Friendly
9	11 November 2011	Ferenc Puskás Stadium, Budapest, Hungary	Liechtenstein	1–0	5–0	Friendly
10	11 November 2011	Ferenc Puskás Stadium, Budapest, Hungary	Liechtenstein	2–0	5–0	Friendly
11	15 November 2011	Miejski Stadion Sportowy, Ostrowiec Świętokrzyski, Poland	Poland	1–1	2–1	Friendly
12	7 September 2012	Estadi Comunal d'Andorra la Vella, Andorra la Vella, Andorra	Andorra	4–0	5–0	2014 FIFA World Cup Qualification
13	4 June 2014	Ferenc Puskás Stadium, Budapest, Hungary	Albania	1–0	1–0	Friendly
14	7 June 2014	Ferenc Puskás Stadium, Budapest, Hungary	Kazakhstan	1–0	3–0	Friendly
15	7 September 2014	Groupama Arena, Budapest, Hungary	Northern Ireland	1–0	1–2	UEFA Euro 2016 Qualification
16	5 June 2015	Nagyerdei Stadion, Debrecen, Hungary	Lithuania	4–0	4–0	Friendly
17	15 November 2015	Groupama Arena, Budapest, Hungary	Norway	1–0	2–1	UEFA Euro 2016 Qualification

== Honours ==
Alania

- Russian Football National League runner-up: 2011–12

Slovan Bratislava

- Slovak Cup: 2016–17
