= Norbert Kundrák =

Hungarian footballer

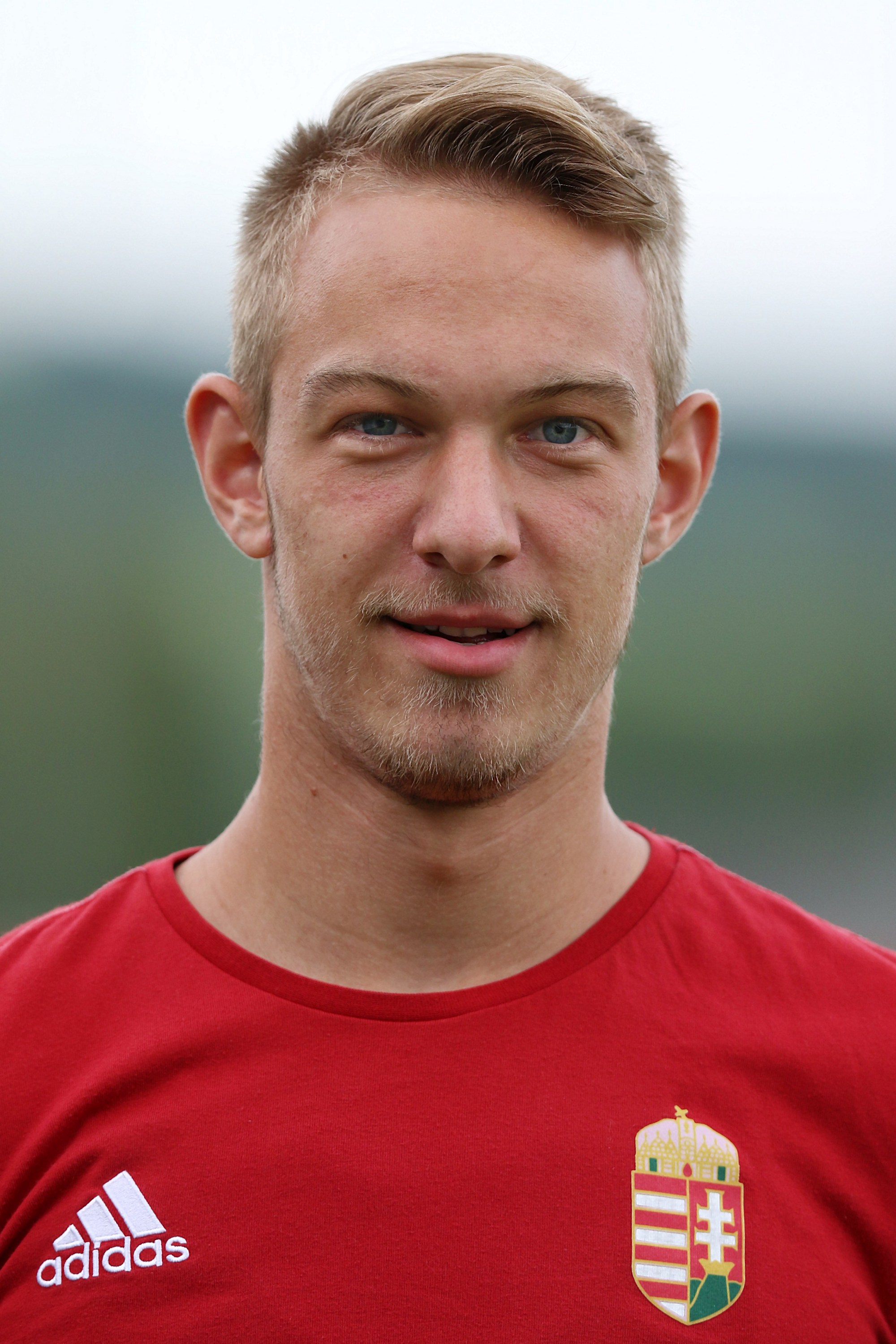

Personal information
- Date of birth: 18 May 1999 (age 27)
- Place of birth: Miskolc, Hungary
- Height: 1.80 m (5 ft 11 in)
- Position: Forward

Team information
- Current team: Soroksár
- Number: 65

Youth career
- 2008–2013: Diósgyőr
- 2013–2016: Honvéd

Senior career*
Years	Team	Apps	(Gls)
2016–2019	Ferencváros	4	(0)
2016–2017	→ Ferencváros II	16	(2)
2017–2019	→ Soroksár (loan)	53	(16)
2019	→ Balmazújváros (loan)	3	(0)
2019–2023	Debrecen	25	(2)
2019–2023	→ Debrecen II	6	(2)
2021	→ DEAC	16	(1)
2022–2023	→ Szeged-Csanád (loan)	29	(5)
2023–2024	Budapest Honvéd	21	(0)
2024–	Soroksár	49	(7)

International career^{‡}
2014	Hungary U-16	2	(0)
2015	Hungary U-17	3	(0)
2017–2018	Hungary U-19	7	(2)
2017	Hungary U-20	1	(1)
2017–2019	Hungary U-21	11	(0)
- * Club domestic league appearances and goals as of 31 May 2026 ‡ National team caps and goals as of 18 November 2019

Norbert Kundrák (born 18 May 1999) is a Hungarian football player who plays for Soroksár.

== Career ==
=== Ferencváros ===
On 13 May 2017, Kundrák played his first match for Ferencváros in a 0-0 drawn against Debrecen in the Hungarian League.

== Career statistics ==
Appearances and goals by club, season and competition
Club	Season	League		Cup		Europe		Total	
Club	Season	Apps	Goals	Apps	Goals	Apps	Goals	Apps	Goals
Ferencváros II
Ferencváros II	2016–17	16	2	0	0	0	0	16	2
Ferencváros II	Total	16	2	0	0	0	0	16	2
Ferencváros
Ferencváros	2016–17	2	0	2	2	0	0	4	2
Ferencváros	2017–18	2	0	2	0	1	0	5	0
Ferencváros	Total	4	0	4	2	1	0	9	2
Soroksár
Soroksár	2017–18	15	2	0	0	–	–	15	2
Soroksár	2018–19	38	14	7	1	–	–	45	15
Soroksár	Total	53	16	7	1	0	0	60	17
Balmazújváros
Balmazújváros	2019–20	3	0	–	–	–	–	3	0
Balmazújváros	Total	3	0	0	0	0	0	3	0
Debrecen
Debrecen	2019–20	19	2	2	0	0	0	21	2
Debrecen	2020–21	4	0	1	0	–	–	5	0
Debrecen	2021–22	0	0	0	0	–	–	0	0
Debrecen	Total	23	2	3	0	0	0	26	2
DEAC
DEAC	2020–21	16	1	0	0	–	–	16	1
DEAC	Total	16	1	0	0	0	0	16	1
Career total		115	21	14	3	1	0	130	24

Updated to games played as of 15 May 2022.
