= Soroksár SC =

Association football club in Hungary

- Full name: Soroksár Sport Club 1905
- Nickname: Sori
- Founded: 1905; 121 years ago
- Ground: Sporttelep Mihály Szamosi; Budapest, Hungary
- Capacity: 5,000
- Chairman: Kálmán Farkas
- Manager: Péter Lipcsei
- League: NB II
- 2025–26: NB II, 13th of 18
- Website: https://www.soroksarsc.hu/
| Home colours | Away colours |

Soroksár SC is a Hungarian football club located in the Soroksár district of Budapest, Hungary. The team's colors are yellow and black.

== History ==
On 20 June 2017, Péter Lipcsei was appointed as the manager of the club.

== Honours ==
=== League ===
- Nemzeti Bajnokság III:
  - Runners-up (1): 1997–98 (promoted to Nemzeti Bajnokság II)

== Current squad ==
As of 20 February 2026

Note: Flags indicate national team as defined under FIFA eligibility rules; some limited exceptions apply. Players may hold more than one non-FIFA nationality.

| No. | Pos. | Nation | Player |
|---|---|---|---|
| 1 | GK | HUN | Máté Apró |
| 3 | FW | NGR | Ibrahim Alonge |
| 4 | DF | HUN | Alexander Kékesi |
| 6 | MF | HUN | Erik Németh |
| 7 | MF | HUN | Kevin Korozmán |
| 8 | MF | HUN | Ádám Vass |
| 9 | FW | SVK | Gábor Tóth |
| 10 | FW | HUN | Zoltán Gálfi |
| 11 | MF | HUN | Krisztián Köböl |
| 12 | FW | HUN | Bence Bogdán |
| 13 | FW | HUN | Justin Varga |
| 14 | MF | HUN | Ádám Madarász (on loan from Ferencváros II) |
| 17 | DF | HUN | Domán Gágyor (on loan from Ferencváros II) |
| 18 | DF | HUN | Márk Könczey |
| 19 | DF | HUN | Dániel Lukács (on loan from Ferencváros II) |
| 20 | FW | HUN | Balázs Lovrencsics (captain) |
| 21 | FW | HUN | Benjámin Gólik |

| No. | Pos. | Nation | Player |
|---|---|---|---|
| 22 | DF | HUN | Csongor Lakatos (on loan from Ferencváros II) |
| 23 | DF | HUN | Martin Króner |
| 24 | FW | HUN | Márk Bencze |
| 25 | DF | HUN | Olivér Nagy (on loan from Ferencváros II) |
| 27 | MF | HUN | Ádám Bagi (on loan from Ferencváros II) |
| 28 | GK | HUN | Levente Jova |
| 30 | FW | HUN | Roskó B. William |
| 31 | GK | HUN | Ádám Holczer |
| 33 | GK | HUN | Levente Őri (on loan from Ferencváros II) |
| 55 | DF | HUN | György Bora |
| 63 | GK | HUN | Dániel Radnóti |
| 65 | FW | HUN | Norbert Kundrák |
| 66 | DF | HUN | Kevin Horváth |
| 68 | FW | HUN | Benjámin Gólik |
| — | DF | SVK | Gergely Tumma |
| — | FW | HUN | Zsombor Kálnoki-Kis |

== Seasons ==
The table below shows the seasons of Soroksár SC.

| Season | Tier | Club's name | Position | Pts |
|---|---|---|---|---|
| 1999–00 | 6 | Soroksári TE | 4 / 16 | 61 |
| 2000 | 3 | Soroksár-Csepel | 4 / 8 | 23 |
| 2000–01 | 4 | Soroksár-Csepel | 1 / 12 | 53 |
| 2001–02 | 3 | Soroksár-Csepel | 3 / 13 | 39 |
| 2002–03 | 3 | Soroksár | 8 / 12 | 28 |
| 2002–03 | 3 | Soroksár | 8 / 12 | 45 |
| 2003–04 | 3 | Soroksár SC | 7 / 16 | 43 |
| 2004–05 | 3 | Soroksár SC | 6 / 16 | 47 |
| 2005–06 | 2 | Soroksár SC | 6 / 16 | 45 |
| 2006–07 | 2 | Soroksár SC | 9 / 16 | 39 |
| 2007–08 | 2 | Soroksár SC | 15 / 16 | 16 |
| 2008–09 | 3 | Soroksár SC | 3 / 16 | 64 |
| 2009–10 | 3 | Soroksár SC | 9 / 14 | 30 |
| 2010–11 | 3 | Soroksár SC | 11 / 16 | 38 |
| 2011–12 | 3 | Soroksár SC | 5 / 16 | 51 |
| 2012–13 | 3 | Soroksár SC | 1 / 14 | 52 |
| 2013–14 | 3 | Soroksár SC | 1 / 16 | 75 |
| 2014–15 | 2 | Soroksár SC | 9 / 16 | 33 |
| 2015–16 | 2 | Soroksár SC | 7 / 16 | 47 |
| 2016–17 | 2 | Soroksár SC | 4 / 20 | 67 |
| 2017–18 | 2 | Soroksár SC | 8 / 20 | 56 |
| 2018–19 | 2 | Soroksár SC | 7 / 20 | 59 |
| 2019–20 | 2 | Soroksár SC | 10 / 20 | 35 |
| 2020–21 | 2 | Soroksár SC | 8 / 20 | 57 |
| 2021–22 | 2 | Soroksár SC | 8 / 20 | 52 |
| 2022–23 | 2 | Soroksár SC | 5 / 20 | 61 |
| 2023–24 | 2 | Soroksár SC | 7 / 18 | 45 |
| 2024–25 | 2 | Soroksár SC | 11 / 16 | 35 |
| 2025–26 | 2 | Soroksár SC | 13 / 16 | 33 |
