= Gergő Lovrencsics =

Hungarian footballer (born 1988)

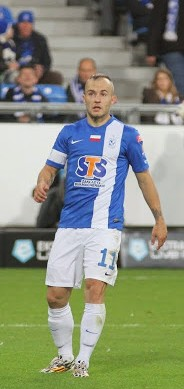
- Lovrencsics playing for Lech

Personal information
- Full name: Gergő Lovrencsics
- Date of birth: 1 September 1988 (age 38)
- Place of birth: Szolnok, Hungary
- Height: 1.77 m (5 ft 10 in)
- Positions: Right winger; right-back

Youth career
- 2003–2007: Szent István

Senior career*
Years	Team	Apps	(Gls)
2007–2008	Budafok	37	(14)
2008–2011	Pécsi Mecsek	84	(35)
2011–2013	Lombard-Pápa	30	(7)
2012–2013	→ Lech Poznań (loan)	27	(7)
2013–2016	Lech Poznań	85	(12)
2016–2021	Ferencváros	137	(5)
2021–2023	Hajduk Split	48	(1)
2023–2024	Solin	30	(0)
Total		478	(80)

International career
2013–2021	Hungary	44	(1)
- * Club domestic league appearances and goals

Gergő Lovrencsics (born 1 September 1988) is a Hungarian former professional footballer who played as a right winger or right-back.

== Club career ==
=== Lech Poznań ===
On 13 July 2013, it was announced that Lovrencsics has signed a contract with Polish club Lech Poznań until 2016.

=== Ferencváros ===
On 5 July 2016, Lovrencsics signed for Nemzeti Bajnokság I club Ferencváros. He said that his return to Hungary was a step forward since his former club Lech could not play in the UEFA Champions League or the UEFA Europa League, having finished seventh in the 2015–16 Ekstraklasa. However, Ferencváros qualified for the 2016–17 UEFA Champions League.

On 16 June 2020, he became champion with Ferencváros by beating Budapest Honvéd FC at the Hidegkuti Nándor Stadion on the 30th match day of the 2019–20 Nemzeti Bajnokság I season.

On 29 September 2020, he was member of the Ferencváros team which qualified for the 2020–21 UEFA Champions League group stage after beating Molde FK on 3–3 aggregate (away goals) at the Groupama Aréna.

  - Lovrencsics and the Establishment of a Football Academy**

Lovrencsics, a renowned footballer, founded a football academy in 2024 aimed at developing young talents in the sport. The academy is designed for children and youth, providing them with quality training, expert support, and opportunities to enhance their football skills. Through organized training sessions, matches, and participation in tournaments, the academy seeks to foster a love for football and enable young players to reach their potential.

The academy is located in Split, Croatia and is open to all aspiring young footballers. Lovrencsics's goal is to create a positive environment that promotes teamwork, sportsmanship, and personal growth.

== International career ==
Lovrencsics made his debut in the Hungary national team on 6 June 2013, against Kuwait.

On 14 November 2014, Lovrencsics gave his first goal assist for the Hungarian team in 1–0 against Finland.

Lovrencsics was selected for Hungary's Euro 2016 squad.

He played in the last group match in a 3–3 draw against Portugal at the Parc Olympique Lyonnais, Lyon on 22 June 2016.

On 1 June 2021, Lovrencsics was included in the final 26-man squad to represent Hungary at the rescheduled UEFA Euro 2020 tournament.

== Personal life ==
He has a younger brother named Balazs, who is also a footballer. Their surname is of Croatian origin.

== Career statistics ==
=== Club ===
Appearances and goals by club, season and competition
Club	Season	League			National cup (Note: Includes Magyar Kupa, Polish Cup, Croatian Cup)		League cup (Note: Includes Ligakupa)		Europe		Total	
Club	Season	Division	Apps	Goals	Apps	Goals	Apps	Goals	Apps	Goals	Apps	Goals
Budafok	2006–07	Nemzeti Bajnokság II	22	4	1	0	—		—		23	4
Budafok	2007–08	Nemzeti Bajnokság III	15	10	0	0	—		—		15	10
Budafok	Total		37	14	1	0	—		—		38	14
Pécs	2007–08	Nemzeti Bajnokság II	13	3	0	0	—		—		13	3
Pécs	2008–09	Nemzeti Bajnokság II	23	10	2	1	13	2	—		38	13
Pécs	2009–10	Nemzeti Bajnokság II	24	13	2	1	—		—		26	14
Pécs	2010–11	Nemzeti Bajnokság II	24	9	3	5	—		—		27	14
Pécs	Total		84	35	7	7	13	2	—		104	44
Pápa	2011–12	Nemzeti Bajnokság I	30	7	2	0	9	4	—		41	11
Lech Poznań (loan)	2012–13	Ekstraklasa	27	7	1	0	—		6 (Note: Appearances in UEFA Europa League)	1	34	8
Lech Poznań	2013–14	Ekstraklasa	37	9	2	0	—		4	0	43	9
Lech Poznań	2014–15	Ekstraklasa	25	3	2	0	—		4	0	31	3
Lech Poznań	2015–16	Ekstraklasa	23	0	5	0	—		10 (Note: Three appearances in UEFA Champions League, seven appearances in UEFA Europa League)	0	38	0
Lech Poznań	Total		112	19	10	0	—		24	1	146	20
Ferencváros	2016–17	Nemzeti Bajnokság I	28	1	7	0	—		2 (Note: Appearances in UEFA Champions League)	0	37	1
Ferencváros	2017–18	Nemzeti Bajnokság I	29	1	1	0	—		4	0	34	1
Ferencváros	2018–19	Nemzeti Bajnokság I	31	2	3	0	—		2	0	36	2
Ferencváros	2019–20	Nemzeti Bajnokság I	27	0	2	0	—		13 (Note: Six appearances in UEFA Champions League, seven appearances in UEFA Europa League)	0	42	0
Ferencváros	2020–21	Nemzeti Bajnokság I	22	1	1	0	—		8	1	31	2
Ferencváros	Total		137	5	14	0	—		29	1	180	6
Hajduk Split	2021–22	Croatian Football League	30	0	2	0	—		2 (Note: Appearances in UEFA Europa Conference League)	0	34	0
Hajduk Split	2022–23	Croatian Football League	18	0	3	0	—		4	0	25	0
Hajduk Split	Total		48	0	5	0	—		6	0	59	0
Solin	2023–24	First Football League	30	0	0	0	—		—		30	0
Career total			478	80	39	7	22	6	59	2	598	95

=== International ===
Appearances and goals by national team and year
National team	Year	Apps	Goals
Hungary	2013	2	0
Hungary	2014	6	0
Hungary	2015	3	1
Hungary	2016	4	0
Hungary	2017	5	0
Hungary	2018	8	0
Hungary	2019	8	0
Hungary	2020	1	0
Hungary	2021	7	0
Total		44	1

Scores and results list Hungary's goal tally first, score column indicates score after each Lovrencsics goal.

List of international goals scored by Gergő Lovrencsics
No.	Date	Venue	Cap	Opponent	Score	Result	Competition
1	11 October 2015	Karaiskakis Stadium, Athens, Greece	9	Greece	1–1	3–4	UEFA Euro 2016 qualification

== Honours ==
Lech Poznań

- Ekstraklasa: 2014–15

Ferencvárosi TC

- Nemzeti Bajnokság I: 2018–19, 2019–20, 2020–21
- Hungarian Cup: 2016–17

Hajduk Split

- Croatian Cup: 2021–22, 2022–23

Individual

- Ekstraklasa Plus of the Season: 2013–14
