= Balázs Lovrencsics =

Hungarian footballer

Personal information
- Date of birth: 30 August 1991 (age 35)
- Place of birth: Budapest, Hungary
- Height: 1.80 m (5 ft 11 in)
- Position: Forward

Team information
- Current team: Soroksár
- Number: 20

Youth career
- 2003–2008: Gödöllői SK

Senior career*
Years	Team	Apps	(Gls)
2008–2009	Kerepes	12	(19)
2009–2010	Gödöllői SK	10	(15)
2010–2012	Vác	16	(1)
2010–2011	→ Gödöllő (loan)	29	(26)
2012–2013	Maglód	40	(33)
2013–2014	Soroksár	29	(21)
2014–2019	Ferencváros	15	(1)
2014–2017	→ Soroksár (loan)	64	(36)
2019–2020	Győri ETO	33	(12)
2020–	Soroksár	185	(67)
- * Club domestic league appearances and goals as of 31 May 2026

Balázs Lovrencsics (born 30 August 1991) is a Hungarian football player who plays for Soroksár.

== Career ==
=== Ferencváros ===
On 16 July 2017, Lovrencsics played his first match for Ferencváros in a 1-1 drawn against Puskás Akadémia FC in the Hungarian League.

== Career statistics ==
Appearances and goals by club, season and competition
Club	Season	League			Cup		Europe		Total	
Club	Season	Division	Apps	Goals	Apps	Goals	Apps	Goals	Apps	Goals
Vác
Vác	2009–10	Nemzeti Bajnokság II	9	0	0	0	—		9	0
Vác	2011–12	Nemzeti Bajnokság II	16	1	1	1	—		17	2
Vác	Total		16	1	1	1	—		17	2
Maglód
Maglód	2011–12	Nemzeti Bajnokság III	14	17	0	0	—		14	17
Maglód	2012–13	Nemzeti Bajnokság III	40	33	1	2	—		41	35
Maglód	Total		26	16	1	2	—		27	18
Soroksár
Soroksár	2013–14	Nemzeti Bajnokság III	29	21	0	0	—		29	21
Soroksár	2014–15	Nemzeti Bajnokság II	28	13	2	1	—		30	14
Soroksár	2015–16	Nemzeti Bajnokság II	1	0	0	0	—		1	0
Soroksár	2016–17	Nemzeti Bajnokság II	35	23	0	0	—		35	23
Soroksár	Total		93	57	2	1	—		95	58
Ferencváros
Ferencváros	2017–18	Nemzeti Bajnokság I	15	1	0	0	3	0	18	1
Ferencváros	2018–19	Nemzeti Bajnokság I	0	0	1	1	0	0	1	1
Ferencváros	Total		15	1	1	1	3	0	19	2
Career total			164	92	5	5	3	0	172	97

Updated to games played as of 5 December 2018.
