= 2022–23 Ferencvárosi TC season =

Ferencváros
2022–23 season
- Chairman: Gábor Kubatov
- Manager: Stanislav Cherchesov
- Stadium: Groupama Arena
- Nemzeti Bajnokság I: 1st
- Magyar Kupa: Round of 32
- UEFA Champions League: Third qualifying round
- UEFA Europa League: Round of 16
- Top goalscorer: League: Ryan Mmaee (12); All: Adama Traoré (18)
- Highest home attendance: 20,675 vs Red Star Belgrade (13 October 2022); UEFA Europa League
- Lowest home attendance: 7,051 vs Puskás Akadémia (12 March 2023); Nemzeti Bajnokság I
- Average home league attendance: 9,500
- Biggest win: 6–0 vs Újpest (A) (4 September 2022); Nemzeti Bajnokság I
- Biggest defeat: 1–4 vs Crvena Zvezda (A) (6 October 2022); UEFA Europa League
Home colours	Away colours	Third colours
- All statistics correct as of 20 March 2023.

The 2022–23 Ferencvárosi TC season is the club's 124th season in existence and the 14th consecutive season in the top flight of Hungarian football. In addition to the domestic league, Ferencváros are participating in this season's editions of the Hungarian Cup and the UEFA Europa League.

On 5 May, Ferencváros became the Hungarian football champions for the thirty-fourth time with 3 games to spare, after second placed Kecskemét lost game.

== Transfers ==
=== Summer ===
In: Note: Flags indicate national team as defined under FIFA eligibility rules; some limited exceptions apply. Players may hold more than one non-FIFA nationality.

No.	Pos.	Nation	Player
4	DF	NED	Mats Knoester (from (Netherlands) Heracles)
7	MF	FRA	Xavier Mercier (from (Belgium) Leuven)
14	MF	BIH	Amer Gojak (from (Croatia) Dinamo Zagreb)
20	FW	MLI	Adama Traoré (from (Moldova) Sheriff Tiraspol)
23	MF	HUN	Dániel Gera (loan return from Puskás Akadémia)
24	MF	HUN	Máté Katona (loan return from Soroksár)
25	DF	DEN	Rasmus Thelander (from (Denmark) Aalborg)
42	GK	HUN	Ádám Varga (loan return from Soroksár)
51	MF	HUN	András Csonka (loan return from Budafok)
77	MF	HUN	Krisztofer Szerető (loan return from Soroksár)

Out: Note: Flags indicate national team as defined under FIFA eligibility rules; some limited exceptions apply. Players may hold more than one non-FIFA nationality.

No.	Pos.	Nation	Player
7	MF	BRA	Somália
11	RW	UKR	Oleksandr Zubkov (to (Ukraine) Shakhtar Donetsk)
14	FW	NGR	Fortune Bassey (loan to (Czech Republic) Viktoria Plzeň)
20	FW	SVK	Róbert Mak (to (Australia) Sydney)
22	MF	GER	Marko Marin (retired)
23	MF	HUN	Dániel Gera (to Diósgyőr)
24	MF	HUN	Máté Katona (loan to Kecskemét)
25	DF	SLO	Miha Blažič (to (France) Angers)
33	DF	GEO	Lasha Dvali (to (Cyprus) APOEL Nicosia)
42	GK	HUN	Ádám Varga (loan to Kecskemét)
51	MF	HUN	András Csonka (to Budafok)
53	DF	HUN	Dominik Csontos (loan to Soroksár)
77	MF	HUN	Krisztofer Szerető (to Nyíregyháza)
88	FW	CRO	Roko Baturina (loan to (Slovenia) Maribor)

=== Winter ===
In: Note: Flags indicate national team as defined under FIFA eligibility rules; some limited exceptions apply. Players may hold more than one non-FIFA nationality.

No.	Pos.	Nation	Player
11	FW	GHA	Owusu Kwabena (from (Azerbaijan) Qarabağ)
14	FW	NGR	Fortune Bassey (loan return from (Czech Republic) Viktoria Plzeň)
22	DF	SUR	Myenty Abena (from (Slovakia) Slovan Bratislava)
30	MF	HUN	Péter Baráth (loan from Debrecen)
52	FW	DEN	Nikolai Frederiksen (loan from (Netherlands) Vitesse)
53	DF	HUN	Dominik Csontos (loan return from Soroksár)
60	MF	ALG	Mehdi Boudjemaa (loan from (Turkey) Hatayspor)
88	FW	CRO	Roko Baturina (loan return from (Slovenia) Maribor)
88	FW	CHI	Ángelo Sagal (loan from (Turkey) Gaziantep)

Out: Note: Flags indicate national team as defined under FIFA eligibility rules; some limited exceptions apply. Players may hold more than one non-FIFA nationality.

No.	Pos.	Nation	Player
14	FW	NGR	Fortune Bassey (loan to (Sweden) Degerfors)
25	DF	DEN	Rasmus Thelander (to (Denmark) Aalborg)
27	MF	GEO	Giorgi Kharaishvili (loan to (Georgia (country)) Dinamo Tbilisi)
53	DF	HUN	Dominik Csontos (to Mezőkövesd)
88	FW	CRO	Roko Baturina (loan to (Spain) Racing Santander)
93	MF	TUN	Aïssa Laïdouni (to (Germany) Union Berlin)

== Pre–season and friendlies ==
Win Draw Loss Fixtures

8 June 2022 Friendly	Čarda (Slovenia)	0–8	Ferencváros	Gornja Radgona, Slovenia
17:30 CEST		Report	Boli 10', 17'; Zachariassen 19', 63'; Lončar 26'; Traoré 41'; Baturina 60', 71'

12 June 2022 Friendly	Ferencváros	1–1	(North Macedonia) Shkendija	Gornja Radgona, Slovenia
17:30 CEST	Knoester 59'	Report	Hasani 61'

22 June 2022 Friendly	Ferencváros	0–3	(Romania) Sepsi Sfântu Gheorghe	Kössen, Austria
17:00 CEST		Report	Dumitrescu 30'; Damașcan 63', 88'

25 June 2022 Friendly	Ferencváros	3–0	(Bulgaria) Ludogorets Razgrad	Kufstein, Austria
17:00 CEST	Marquinhos 54'; Wingo 81', 90+2'	Report

28 June 2022 Friendly	Ferencváros	4–1	(Germany) Karlsruhe	Kössen, Austria
17:00 CEST	Lončar 2', 37'; Traoré 24'; Bassey 67'	Report	Heise 22'

== Competitions ==
=== Overview ===
Competition	First match	Last match	Starting round	Final position	Record							
Competition	First match	Last match	Starting round	Final position	Pld	W	D	L	GF	GA	GD	Win %
Nemzeti Bajnokság I	31 July 2022	27 May 2023	Matchday 1	Winners	33	19	6	8	62	33	+29	57.58
Magyar Kupa	18 September 2022	19 October 2022	Round of 64	Round of 32	2	1	0	1	4	3	+1	50.00
UEFA Champions League	6 July 2022	9 August 2022	First qualifying round	Third qualifying round	6	2	2	2	12	8	+4	33.33
UEFA Europa League	18 August 2022	16 March 2023	Play-off round	Round of 16	10	4	1	5	12	14	−2	40.00
Total					51	26	9	16	90	58	+32	50.98

Source: Competitions

=== Nemzeti Bajnokság I ===
==== League table ====
Pos	Team	Pld	W	D	L	GF	GA	GD	Pts	Qualification or relegation
1	Ferencváros (C)	33	19	6	8	62	33	+29	63	Qualification for the Champions League first qualifying round
2	Kecskemét	33	15	12	6	48	32	+16	57	Qualification for the Europa Conference League second qualifying round
3	Debrecen	33	15	9	9	52	39	+13	54	Qualification for the Europa Conference League second qualifying round
4	Puskás Akadémia	33	14	11	8	48	42	+6	53	
5	Paks	33	14	7	12	57	57	0	49	

Source: Hungarian Football Federation (in Hungarian), Soccerway
Rules for classification: 1) Points; 2) Matches won; 3) Goal difference; 4) Goals scored; 5) Head-to-head points; 6) Head-to-head goal difference; 7) Fair play ranking; 8) Drawing of lots.
(C) Champions

==== Results summary ====
Overall								Home						Away					
Pld	W	D	L	GF	GA	GD	Pts	W	D	L	GF	GA	GD	W	D	L	GF	GA	GD
33	19	6	8	62	33	+29	63	10	4	2	33	14	+19	9	2	6	29	19	+10

Source: Soccerway

==== Results by round ====
Round	1	2	3	4	5	6	7	8	9	10	11	12	13	14	15	16	17	18	19	20	21	22	23	24	25	26	27	28	29	30	31	32	33
Ground	H	A	H	A	H	A	A	H	A	H	A	A	H	A	H	A	H	H	A	H	A	H	H	A	H	A	H	A	A	H	A	H	A
Result	W	W	W	W	W	W	W	W	L	W	L	W	W	D	W	W	D	W	D	D	W	D	L	L	D	L	W	W	W	W	L	L	L
Position	2	1	1	1	1	1	1	1	1	1	1	1	1	1	1	1	1	1	1	1	1	1	1	1	1	1	1	1	1	1	1	1	1

Source: Matches
A = Away; H = Home; W = Win; D = Draw; L = Loss

==== Matches ====
31 July 2022 1	Ferencváros	1–0	Puskás Akadémia	Budapest
20:30 CEST (UTC+2)	Zachariassen 90+4'	Report		Stadium: Groupama Arena; Attendance: 7,325; Referee: Ferenc Karakó

24 January 2023 2	Zalaegerszeg	1–2	Ferencváros	Zalaegerszeg
18:30 CET (UTC+1)	Huszti 21'	Report	Marquinhos 18' (pen.); Traoré 90'	Stadium: ZTE Arena; Attendance: 5,514; Referee: József Erdős

14 August 2022 3	Ferencváros	4–0	Fehérvár	Budapest
20:00 CEST (UTC+2)	Auzqui 15'; Mercier 38'; Traoré 47'; Boli 90+1'	Report		Stadium: Groupama Arena; Attendance: 9,795; Referee: Balázs Berke

1 February 2023 4	Paks	1–3	Ferencváros	Paks
18:30 CET (UTC+1)	Kinyik 49'	Report	Kwabena 72'; Zachariassen 83'; R. Mmaee 90' (pen.)	Stadium: Fehérvári úti Stadion; Attendance: 2,501; Referee: Bence Csonka

28 August 2022 5	Ferencváros	3–1	Budapest Honvéd	Budapest
17:30 CEST (UTC+2)	Traoré 41', 51', 54'; Vécsei (red card) 70'	Report	Prenga 90+7'	Stadium: Groupama Arena; Attendance: 10,213; Referee: Csaba Pintér

31 August 2022 6	Vasas	0–1	Ferencváros	Budapest
20:30 CEST (UTC+2)		Report	Zachariassen 17'	Stadium: Illovszky Rudolf Stadion; Attendance: 4,295; Referee: Sándor Andó-Szabó

4 September 2022 7	Újpest	0–6	Ferencváros	Budapest
17:30 CEST (UTC+2)		Report	Zachariassen 9'; Boli 24', 45' (pen.); Traoré 32'; Auzqui 67'; R. Mmaee 89'	Stadium: Szusza Ferenc Stadion; Attendance: 6,981; Referee: Tamás Bognár

11 September 2022 8	Ferencváros	3–0	Kisvárda	Budapest
17:30 CEST (UTC+2)	R. Mmaee 27' (pen.), 63'; S. Mmaee 72'	Report		Stadium: Groupama Arena; Attendance: 9,111; Referee: Balázs Berke

2 October 2022 9	Kecskemét	2–0	Ferencváros	Kecskemét
16:30 CEST (UTC+2)	Nagy 28', 34' (pen.)	Report		Stadium: Széktói Stadion; Attendance: 2,527; Referee: Ferenc Karakó

9 October 2022 10	Ferencváros	2–0	Debrecen	Budapest
18:00 CEST (UTC+2)	Vécsei 11'; Zachariassen 56'	Report		Stadium: Groupama Arena; Attendance: 10,857; Referee: Balázs Berke

16 October 2022 11	Mezőkövesd	2–1	Ferencváros	Mezőkövesd
17:45 CEST (UTC+2)	Karnitsky 27'; Dibusz 83' (o.g.)	Report	Marquinhos 2'	Stadium: Városi Stadion; Attendance: 4,161; Referee: Tamás Bognár

22 October 2022 12	Puskás Akadémia	2–4	Ferencváros	Felcsút
18:30 CEST (UTC+2)	Puljić 3' (pen.); Nagy 33'	Report	Marquinhos 8'; R. Mmaee 29'; Traoré 45', 53'	Stadium: Pancho Aréna; Attendance: 3,121; Referee: József Erdős

30 October 2022 13	Ferencváros	2–1	Zalaegerszeg	Budapest
17:30 CET (UTC+1)	Nguen 13'; Esiti 79'	Report	Ikoba 84'	Stadium: Groupama Arena; Attendance: 9,107; Referee: Ádám Farkas

6 November 2022 14	Fehérvár	2–2	Ferencváros	Székesfehérvár
20:00 CET (UTC+1)	Kastrati 52'; Dárdai 89'	Report	R. Mmaee 14' (pen.), 58'	Stadium: MOL Aréna Sóstó; Attendance: 6,121; Referee: Tamás Bognár

9 November 2022 15	Ferencváros	3–2	Paks	Budapest
18:15 CET (UTC+1)	Zachariassen 22'; R. Mmaee 45+1' (pen.) (red card) 90+4'; Botka 90+2'	Report	Bőle 7'; Wingo 40' (o.g.)	Stadium: Groupama Arena; Attendance: 7,129; Referee: Sándor Andó-Szabó

13 November 2022 16	Budapest Honvéd	0–2	Ferencváros	Budapest
15:45 CET (UTC+1)		Report	Traoré 52'; Auzqui 90+4'	Stadium: Bozsik Aréna; Attendance: 4,938; Referee: Ádám Farkas

28 January 2023 17	Ferencváros	0–0	Vasas	Budapest
19:30 CET (UTC+1)		Report		Stadium: Groupama Arena; Attendance: 8,579; Referee: Gergő Bogár

5 February 2023 18	Ferencváros	3–1	Újpest	Budapest
17:30 CET (UTC+1)	Hall 38' (o.g.); Marquinhos 70'; R. Mmaee 85'	Report	Mudrinski 55'; Nikolić (red card) 80'	Stadium: Groupama Arena; Attendance: 18,197; Referee: Balázs Berke

11 February 2023 19	Kisvárda	0–0	Ferencváros	Kisvárda
17:00 CET (UTC+1)		Report		Stadium: Várkerti Stadion; Attendance: 3,150; Referee: Ádám Farkas

18 February 2023 20	Ferencváros	1–1	Kecskemét	Budapest
17:00 CET (UTC+1)	Traoré 36'	Report	Horváth 53'	Stadium: Groupama Arena; Attendance: 9,511; Referee: Ferenc Karakó

26 February 2023 21	Debrecen	0–2	Ferencváros	Debrecen
16:30 CET (UTC+1)	Mance (red card) 82'	Report	R. Mmaee 37', 79'	Stadium: Nagyerdei Stadion; Attendance: 13,004; Referee: Sándor Andó-Szabó

3 March 2023 22	Ferencváros	1–1	Mezőkövesd	Budapest
20:15 CET (UTC+1)	Traoré 11'	Report	Drazic 24'	Stadium: Groupama Arena; Attendance: 7,127; Referee: Ádám Farkas

12 March 2023 23	Ferencváros	1–2	Puskás Akadémia	Budapest
18:15 CET (UTC+1)	Botka 90+6'	Report	Komáromi 28'; Puljić 37' (red card) 56'	Stadium: Groupama Arena; Attendance: 7,051; Referee: Csaba Pintér

19 March 2023 24	Zalaegerszeg	1–0	Ferencváros	Zalaegerszeg
20:15 CET (UTC+1)	Ubochioma 45+1'	Report		Stadium: ZTE Arena; Attendance: 3,504; Referee: Sándor Andó-Szabó

2 April 2023 25	Ferencváros	2–2	Fehérvár	Budapest
16:30 CEST (UTC+2)	Botka (yellow card) 27'; Kovačević (yellow card) 40'; Lisztes 59', 70'; Bogdán (yellow card) 64'	Report	Stopira 7', (yellow card) 76'; Dárdai (yellow card) 10'; Makarenko 79'; Négo (yellow card) 90+3'	Stadium: Groupama Arena; Attendance: 12,079; Referee: Gergő Bogár
Note: Bogdán was not on the pitch.

8 April 2023 26	Paks	3–2	Ferencváros	Paks
19:30 CEST (UTC+2)	Kinyik (yellow card) 19'; Varga 36', 55' (pen.); Szélpál (yellow card) 59'; Papp 70'; Balogh (yellow card) 90+1'	Report	Zachariassen 23'; Abena (yellow card) 34' (yellow-red card) 67'; Kovačević (yellow card) 54'; Botka 56', (yellow card) 83'; Lisztes (yellow card) 60'	Stadium: Fehérvári úti Stadion; Attendance: 4,280; Referee: Ferenc Karakó

15 April 2023 27	Ferencváros	3–0	Budapest Honvéd	Budapest
19:30 CEST (UTC+2)	Mmaee 42'; Marquinhos 72'; Kwabena 87'; Gojak (yellow card) 90+2'	Report	Szabó (yellow card) 51'; Gomis (yellow card) 51'	Stadium: Groupama Arena; Attendance: 11,793; Referee: Csaba Pintér

22 April 2023 28	Vasas	0–1	Ferencváros	Budapest
19:30 CEST (UTC+2)	Holender (yellow card) 30'; Urblík (yellow card) 70'; Ihrig-Farkas (yellow card) 90+5'	Report	Kovačević (yellow card) 32'; Lisztes 79'	Stadium: Illovszky Rudolf Stadion; Attendance: 3,718; Referee: József Erdős

1 May 2023 29	Újpest	2–3	Ferencváros	Budapest
18:00 CEST (UTC+2)	Gouré 41', (yellow card) 65'; Csoboth (yellow card) 45+4'; Jakobi (yellow card) 81'; Simon 90+3'; Hall (yellow card) 90+9'	Report	Gojak 24', 54', (yellow card) 28'; Pászka (yellow card) 45+5'; Marquinhos (yellow card) 58'; Lisztes 60'; Botka (yellow card) 65'	Stadium: Szusza Ferenc Stadion; Attendance: 11,109; Referee: Gergő Bogár

6 May 2023 30	Ferencváros	3–0	Kisvárda	Budapest
19:45 CEST (UTC+2)	Pászka 49'; Lisztes 53'; S. Mmaee 63'	Report	Navrátil (yellow card) 36'; Kovačić (yellow card) 55'	Stadium: Groupama Arena; Attendance: 13,133; Referee: Csaba Pintér

13 May 2023 31	Kecskemét	2–0	Ferencváros	Kecskemét
19:30 CEST (UTC+2)	G. Szalai 34'; Belényesi (yellow card) 76'; B. Tóth 86'; Nikitscher (yellow card) 90+1'	Report	Esiti (yellow card) 51'; Kwabena (yellow card) 54'; Lisztes (yellow card) 60'; Abena (red card) 73'; Knoester (yellow card) 87'; Traoré (yellow card) 90+1'	Stadium: Széktói Stadion; Attendance: 4,950; Referee: Balázs Berke

20 May 2023 32	Ferencváros	1–3	Debrecen	Budapest
17:45 CEST (UTC+2)	Pászka 42'	Report	Babunski 63', 67'; Bódi 75' (pen.)	Stadium: Groupama Arena; Attendance: 15,879; Referee: József Erdős

28 May 2023 33	Mezőkövesd	1–0	Ferencváros	Mezőkövesd
17:30 CEST (UTC+2)	Filip (yellow card) 36'; Dražić 45+1' (pen.); Lehoczky (yellow card) 58'; Brtan (yellow card) 68'	Report	Szécsi (yellow card) 45+1'; Marquinhos (yellow card) 89'	Stadium: Városi Stadion; Attendance: 4,110; Referee: Ferenc Karakó

=== Magyar Kupa ===
18 September 2022 Round of 64	Bicske	0–2	Ferencváros	Bicske
16:00 CEST (UTC+2)	Kovács (yellow card) 30'; Vékony (yellow card) 37'; Bozsoki (yellow card) 46'; Hirman (yellow card) 75'	Report	Gojak 45+1'; Knoester (yellow card) 54'; Vécsei 87'	Stadium: Bicskei TC Sporttelep; Attendance: 3,000; Referee: Péter Antal

19 October 2022 Round of 32	Iváncsa	3–2 (a.e.t.)	Ferencváros	Iváncsa
13:00 CEST (UTC+2)	Suszter 6'; Aradi 57'; Petrezselyem (yellow card) 80'; Barta (yellow card) 93'; Kercsó 96'	Report	Zachariassen 4'; R. Mmaee 19'; S. Mmaee (yellow card) 83'; Gojak (yellow card) 95'	Stadium: Károlyi István Sporttelep; Attendance: 1,000; Referee: Marcell Derdák

=== UEFA Champions League ===
==== First qualifying round ====
6 July 2022 First leg	Tobol (Kazakhstan)	0–0	(Hungary) Ferencváros	Kostanay, Kazakhstan
20:00 ALMT (UTC+6)	Jovančić (yellow card) 32'; Kairov (yellow card) 38'	Report	Vécsei (yellow card) 33'; Boli (yellow card) 38'; Laïdouni (yellow card) 71'	Stadium: Central Stadium; Attendance: 8,420; Referee: Dario Bel (Croatia)

13 July 2022 Second leg	Ferencváros (Hungary)	5–1 (5–1 agg.)	(Kazakhstan) Tobol	Budapest, Hungary
20:00 CEST (UTC+2)	Traoré 4', 17'; Laïdouni 21'; Kovačević (yellow card) 56'; Bassey 74', 90+1'	Report	Sergeyev 23'; Muzhikov (yellow card) 78' (yellow-red card) 81'	Stadium: Groupama Arena; Attendance: 17,347; Referee: Krzysztof Jakubik (Poland)
Note: Ferencváros won 5–1 on aggregate.

==== Second qualifying round ====
20 July 2022 First leg	Ferencváros (Hungary)	1–2	(Slovakia) Slovan Bratislava	Budapest, Hungary
20:00 CEST (UTC+2)	Nguen (yellow card) 31'; Zachariassen 70'	Report	Šaponjić (yellow card) 27'; Kashia 81'; Barseghyan 86'	Stadium: Groupama Arena; Attendance: 20,459; Referee: Ricardo de Burgos (Spain)

27 July 2022 Second leg	Slovan Bratislava (Slovakia)	1–4 (3–5 agg.)	(Hungary) Ferencváros	Bratislava, Slovakia
20:00 CEST (UTC+2)	De Marco (yellow card) 27', (goal) 70'; Kankava (yellow card) 52'; Kucka (yellow card) 55'; Šaponjić (yellow card) 84'	Report	Laïdouni (yellow card) 4', (goal) 90+5'; Boli 20'; Zachariassen 31', (yellow card) 55'; Traoré (yellow card) 57', (goal) 89'	Stadium: Tehelné pole Attendance: 21,500; Referee: Marco Di Bello (Italy)
Note: Ferencváros won 5–3 on aggregate.

==== Third qualifying round ====
3 August 2022 First leg	Qarabağ (Azerbaijan)	1–1	(Hungary) Ferencváros	Baku, Azerbaijan
20:00 AZT (UTC+4)	Janković (yellow card) 28'; Owusu 34'; Mustafazade (yellow card) 66'	Report	Boli 17'; Botka (yellow card) 61'; Kovačević (yellow card) 82'	Stadium: Tofiq Bahramov Republican Stadium; Attendance: 31,200; Referee: Andreas Ekberg (Sweden)

9 August 2022 Second leg	Ferencváros (Hungary)	1–3 (2–4 agg.)	(Azerbaijan) Qarabağ	Budapest, Hungary
20:00 CEST (UTC+2)	Thelander (yellow card) 30'; Boli (yellow card) 34'; Botka (yellow card) 84'; Traoré 86'	Report	Zoubir 7'; Janković (yellow card) 31'; Wadji 54', 78'; Bayramov (yellow card) 62'; Sheydayev (yellow card) 84'; Andrade (yellow card) 90+1'; Vešović (yellow card) 90+3'	Stadium: Groupama Arena; Attendance: 18,875; Referee: Carlos del Cerro Grande (Spain)
Note: Qarabağ won 4–2 on aggregate.

=== UEFA Europa League ===
==== Play-off round ====
18 August 2022 First leg	Ferencváros (Hungary)	4–0	(Republic of Ireland) Shamrock Rovers	Budapest, Hungary
18:30 CEST (UTC+2)	Auzqui 13', (yellow card) 27'; Traoré 35', 48'; Knoester (yellow card) 45+2'; Ćivić 90+3'	Report	Hoare (yellow card) 13'; Grace (yellow card) 48'; Farrugia (yellow card) 72'	Stadium: Groupama Arena; Attendance: 15,239; Referee: Glenn Nyberg (Sweden)

25 August 2022 Second leg	Shamrock Rovers (Republic of Ireland)	1–0 (1–4 agg.)	(Hungary) Ferencváros	Dublin, Ireland
20:00 IST (UTC+1)	Emakhu (yellow card) 34'; Towell (yellow card) 44'; Lyons 89'	Report	Auzqui (yellow card) 21'; Esiti (yellow card) 55'	Stadium: Tallaght Stadium; Attendance: 7,163; Referee: François Letexier (France)
Note: Ferencváros won 4–1 on aggregate.

==== Group stage ====
The draw for the group stage was held on 26 August 2022.

Pos	Team	Pld	W	D	L	GF	GA	GD	Pts	Qualification	FER	MON	TRA	ZVE
1	(Hungary) Ferencváros	6	3	1	2	8	9	−1	10 (Note: Head to head points: Ferencváros 4, Monaco 1.)	Advance to round of 16	—	1–1	3–2	2–1
2	(France) Monaco	6	3	1	2	9	8	+1	10	Advance to knockout round play-offs	0–1	—	3–1	4–1
3	(Turkey) Trabzonspor	6	3	0	3	11	9	+2	9	Transfer to Europa Conference League	1–0	4–0	—	2–1
4	(Serbia) Red Star Belgrade	6	2	0	4	9	11	−2	6		4–1	0–1	2–1	—

Source: UEFA
Rules for classification: Group stage tiebreakers
Notes:

8 September 2022 1	Ferencváros (Hungary)	3–2	(Turkey) Trabzonspor	Budapest, Hungary
21:00 CEST (UTC+2)	Nguen 5', 44' (pen.); Ćivić (red card) 16'; Traoré 29'; Bešić (yellow card) 41'; Wingo (yellow card) 80'; Dibusz (yellow card) 85'; Knoester (yellow card) 90+2'	Report	Gómez 39'; Bardhi (yellow card) 41'; Bozok 71'	Stadium: Groupama Arena; Attendance: 17,987; Referee: Fabio Maresca (Italy)

15 September 2022 2	Monaco (France)	0–1	(Hungary) Ferencváros	Fontvieille, Monaco
18:45 CEST (UTC+2)	Embolo (yellow card) 77'	Report	Bešić (yellow card) 69'; Vécsei 79'; Traoré (yellow card) 90+4'	Stadium: Stade Louis II; Attendance: 3,931; Referee: Espen Eskås (Norway)

6 October 2022 3	Red Star Belgrade (Serbia)	4–1	(Hungary) Ferencváros	Belgrade, Serbia
18:45 CEST (UTC+2)	Dragović (yellow card) 21'; Kanga 27' (pen.), 60'; Mitrović 35'; Katai 50'; Sanogo (yellow card) 54'; Rodić (yellow card) 76'	Report	Zachariassen 71'; S. Mmaee (yellow card) 73'; Knoester (yellow card) 79'; Vécsei (yellow card) 86'	Stadium: Red Star Stadium; Attendance: 26,244; Referee: Lawrence Visser (Belgium)

13 October 2022 4	Ferencváros (Hungary)	2–1	(Serbia) Red Star Belgrade	Budapest, Hungary
21:00 CEST (UTC+2)	Zachariassen 23'; Knoester (yellow card) 28'; S. Mmaee 61'; Traoré (yellow card) 62'; Bogdán (yellow card) 85'; Nguen (yellow card) 90+1'	Report	Eraković (yellow card) 21'; Mitrović 55'	Stadium: Groupama Arena; Attendance: 20,675; Referee: Daniel Stefański (Poland)

27 October 2022 5	Ferencváros (Hungary)	1–1	(France) Monaco	Budapest, Hungary
21:00 CEST (UTC+2)	Botka (yellow card) 24'; Dibusz (yellow card) 32'; Laïdouni (yellow card) 80'; Zachariassen 81'; Cherchesov (not on pitch) (yellow card) 90+1'; Bešić (yellow card) 90+3'	Report	Ben Yedder 31'; Camara (yellow card) 57'; Maripán (yellow card) 84'	Stadium: Groupama Arena; Attendance: 20,517; Referee: Enea Jorgji (Albania)

3 November 2022 6	Trabzonspor (Turkey)	1–0	(Hungary) Ferencváros	Trabzon, Turkey
20:45 TRT (UTC+3)	Bakasetas 7'; Ömür (yellow card) 45+1'; Hugo (yellow card) 51'; Bartra (yellow card) 81'	Report	Laïdouni (yellow card) 27'; S. Mmaee (yellow card) 47'; Vécsei (yellow card) 88'	Stadium: Şenol Güneş Sports Complex; Attendance: 22,840; Referee: Harm Osmers (Germany)

==== Knockout phase ====
===== Round of 16 =====
The draw for the round of 16 was held on 24 February 2023.

9 March 2023 First leg	Bayer Leverkusen (Germany)	2–0	(Hungary) Ferencváros	Leverkusen, Germany
18:45 CET (UTC+01:00)	Demirbay 10', (yellow card) 38'; Wirtz (yellow card) 75'; Kossounou (yellow card) 83'; Tapsoba 86'	Report	Marquinhos (yellow card) 45'; Zachariassen (yellow card) 49'; Botka (yellow card) 75'; Ćivić (yellow card) 90+3'	Stadium: BayArena; Attendance: 25,001; Referee: Davide Massa (Italy)

16 March 2023 Second leg	Ferencváros (Hungary)	0–2 (0–4 agg.)	(Germany) Bayer Leverkusen	Budapest, Hungary
21:00 CET (UTC+01:00)	Cherchesov (not on pitch) (yellow card) 40'	Report	Diaby 3'; Adli 81'	Stadium: Puskás Aréna (Note: Ferencváros played their knockout matches at Puskás Aréna, Budapest, instead of their regular stadium, Groupama Arena, Budapest.); Attendance: 50,675; Referee: Artur Soares Dias (Portugal)
Note: Bayer Leverkusen won 4–0 on aggregate.

== Statistics ==
=== Appearances and goals ===
Last updated on 20 March 2023.

No.	Pos	Nat	Player	Total		Nemzeti Bajnokság I		CL/EL		Magyar Kupa	
No.	Pos	Nat	Player	Apps	Goals	Apps	Goals	Apps	Goals	Apps	Goals
1	GK	(Hungary) HUN	Ádám Bogdán	5	-5	2	-1	1	-1	2	-3
3	DF	(Morocco) MAR	Samy Mmaee	26	2	13	1	11	1	2	0
4	DF	(Netherlands) NED	Mats Knoester	33	0	18	0	13	0	2	0
5	MF	(Bosnia and Herzegovina) BIH	Muhamed Bešić	24	0	16	0	7	0	1	0
7	MF	(France) FRA	Xavier Mercier	20	1	13	1	5	0	2	0
8	FW	(Morocco) MAR	Ryan Mmaee	31	12	19	11	10	0	2	1
10	FW	(Norway) NOR	Tokmac Nguen	29	3	15	1	14	2	0	0
11	FW	(Ghana) GHA	Owusu Kwabena	2	1	2	1	0	0	0	0
13	MF	(Nigeria) NGR	Anderson Esiti	30	1	16	1	13	0	1	0
14	MF	(Bosnia and Herzegovina) BIH	Amer Gojak	20	1	11	0	7	0	2	1
15	DF	(Bosnia and Herzegovina) BIH	Adnan Kovačević	23	0	15	0	8	0	0	0
16	MF	(Norway) NOR	Kristoffer Zachariassen	36	12	20	6	14	5	2	1
17	DF	(Bosnia and Herzegovina) BIH	Eldar Ćivić	25	1	14	0	11	1	0	0
18	MF	(Hungary) HUN	Dávid Sigér	10	0	9	0	0	0	1	0
19	MF	(Hungary) HUN	Bálint Vécsei	33	3	17	1	14	1	2	1
20	FW	(Mali) MLI	Adama Traoré	38	18	22	11	15	7	1	0
21	DF	(Hungary) HUN	Endre Botka	29	2	17	2	11	0	1	0
22	DF	(Suriname) SUR	Myenty Abena	7	0	5	0	2	0	0	0
23	DF	(Hungary) HUN	Lóránd Pászka	20	0	13	0	6	0	1	0
27	MF	(Georgia (country)) GEO	Giorgi Kharaishvili	2	0	1	0	0	0	1	0
28	FW	(Argentina) ARG	Carlos Auzqui	20	4	15	3	4	1	1	0
29	GK	(Hungary) HUN	Gergő Szécsi	0	0	0	-0	0	-0	0	-0
30	MF	(Hungary) HUN	Péter Baráth	1	0	1	0	0	0	0	0
31	DF	(United States) USA	Henry Wingo	28	0	14	0	12	0	2	0
50	FW	(Brazil) BRA	Marquinhos	31	4	21	4	8	0	2	0
52	FW	(Denmark) DEN	Nikolai Frederiksen	7	0	5	0	2	0	0	0
60	MF	(Algeria) ALG	Mehdi Boudjemaa	3	0	3	0	0	0	0	0
70	FW	(Ivory Coast) CIV	Franck Boli	22	5	9	3	12	2	1	0
88	FW	(Chile) CHI	Ángelo Sagal	2	0	2	0	0	0	0	0
90	GK	(Hungary) HUN	Dénes Dibusz	37	-40	22	-19	15	-21	0	-0
Youth players:
52	FW	(Hungary) HUN	Damir Redžić	1	0	0	0	1	0	0	0
54	DF	(Hungary) HUN	Norbert Kaján	0	0	0	0	0	0	0	0
56	DF	(Hungary) HUN	Olivér Nagy	0	0	0	0	0	0	0	0
57	FW	(Hungary) HUN	Ádám Bagi	0	0	0	0	0	0	0	0
58	MF	(Hungary) HUN	Zétény Varga	1	0	0	0	0	0	1	0
59	MF	(Hungary) HUN	Balázs Manner	1	0	0	0	1	0	0	0
61	GK	(Hungary) HUN	Szabolcs Mergl	0	0	0	-0	0	-0	0	-0
62	GK	(Hungary) HUN	Levente Őri	0	0	0	-0	0	-0	0	-0
63	GK	(Hungary) HUN	Marcell Kovács	0	0	0	-0	0	-0	0	-0
Out to loan:
14	FW	(Nigeria) NGR	Fortune Bassey	4	2	1	0	3	2	0	0
42	GK	(Hungary) HUN	Ádám Varga	0	0	0	0	0	0	0	0
44	MF	(Bosnia and Herzegovina) BIH	Stjepan Lončar	3	0	1	0	2	0	0	0
57	DF	(Hungary) HUN	Patrick Iyinbor	0	0	0	0	0	0	0	0
76	MF	(Hungary) HUN	Krisztián Lisztes	2	0	0	0	2	0	0	0
80	FW	(Serbia) SRB	Željko Gavrić	0	0	0	0	0	0	0	0
88	FW	(Croatia) CRO	Roko Baturina	0	0	0	0	0	0	0	0
Players no longer at the club:
11	FW	(Ukraine) UKR	Oleksandr Zubkov	0	0	0	0	0	0	0	0
25	DF	(Denmark) DEN	Rasmus Thelander	7	0	3	0	3	0	1	0
53	DF	(Hungary) HUN	Dominik Csontos	0	0	0	0	0	0	0	0
93	MF	(Tunisia) TUN	Aïssa Laïdouni	24	2	10	0	13	2	1	0

=== Top scorers ===
Includes all competitive matches. The list is sorted by shirt number when total goals are equal.

Position	Nation	Number	Name	Nemzeti Bajnokság I	UEFA Champions League/Europa League	Magyar Kupa	Total
1	(Mali)	20	Adama Traoré	11	7	0	18
2	(Morocco)	8	Ryan Mmaee	12	0	1	13
2	(Norway)	16	Kristoffer Zachariassen	7	5	1	13
4	(Brazil)	50	Marquinhos	5	0	0	5
4	(Ivory Coast)	70	Franck Boli	3	2	0	5
4	(Hungary)	76	Krisztián Lisztes	5	0	0	5
7	(Argentina)	28	Carlos Auzqui	3	1	0	4
8	(Morocco)	3	Samy Mmaee	2	1	0	3
8	(Norway)	10	Tokmac Nguen	1	2	0	3
8	(Bosnia and Herzegovina)	14	Amer Gojak	2	0	1	3
8	(Hungary)	19	Bálint Vécsei	1	1	1	3
8	(Hungary)	21	Endre Botka	3	0	0	3
13	(Ghana)	11	Owusu Kwabena	2	0	0	2
13	(Nigeria)	14	Fortune Bassey	0	2	0	2
13	(Hungary)	23	Lóránd Pászka	2	0	0	2
13	(Tunisia)	93	Aïssa Laïdouni	0	2	0	2
17	(France)	7	Xavier Mercier	1	0	0	1
17	(Nigeria)	13	Anderson Esiti	1	0	0	1
17	(Bosnia and Herzegovina)	17	Eldar Ćivić	0	1	0	1
/	/	/	Own Goals	1	0	0	1
			TOTALS	62	24	4	90

=== Hat-tricks ===
Player	Against	Result	Date	Competition	Round
(Mali) Adama Traoré	Budapest Honvéd	3–1 (H)	28 August 2022	Nemzeti Bajnokság I	5

=== Disciplinary record ===
Includes all competitive matches. Players with 1 card or more included only.

Last updated on 20 March 2023

Position	Nation	Number	Name	Nemzeti Bajnokság I		UEFA Champions League/Europa League		Magyar Kupa		Total (Hu Total)	
Position	Nation	Number	Name	Yellow card	Red card	Yellow card	Red card	Yellow card	Red card	Yellow card	Red card
GK	(Hungary)	1	Ádám Bogdán	1	0	1	0	0	0	2 (1)	0 (0)
DF	(Morocco)	3	Samy Mmaee	4	0	3	0	1	0	8 (4)	0 (0)
DF	(Netherlands)	4	Mats Knoester	6	0	4	0	1	0	11 (6)	0 (0)
DF	(Bosnia and Herzegovina)	5	Muhamed Bešić	4	0	3	0	0	0	7 (4)	0 (0)
FW	(Morocco)	8	Ryan Mmaee	1	1	0	0	0	0	1 (1)	1 (1)
FW	(Norway)	10	Tokmac Nguen	3	0	2	0	0	0	5 (3)	0 (0)
DF	(Nigeria)	13	Anderson Esiti	4	0	1	0	0	0	5 (4)	0 (0)
MF	(Bosnia and Herzegovina)	14	Amer Gojak	0	0	0	0	1	0	1 (0)	0 (0)
DF	(Bosnia and Herzegovina)	15	Adnan Kovačević	0	0	2	0	0	0	2 (0)	0 (0)
MF	(Norway)	16	Kristoffer Zachariassen	1	0	2	0	0	0	3 (1)	0 (0)
DF	(Bosnia and Herzegovina)	17	Eldar Ćivić	1	0	1	1	0	0	2 (1)	1 (0)
MF	(Hungary)	18	Dávid Sigér	2	0	0	0	0	0	2 (2)	0 (0)
MF	(Hungary)	19	Bálint Vécsei	1	1	3	0	0	0	4 (1)	1 (1)
FW	(Mali)	20	Adama Traoré	2	0	3	0	0	0	5 (2)	0 (0)
DF	(Hungary)	21	Endre Botka	3	0	5	0	0	0	8 (3)	0 (0)
DF	(Hungary)	23	Lóránd Pászka	3	0	0	0	0	0	3 (3)	0 (0)
DF	(Denmark)	25	Rasmus Thelander	0	0	1	0	0	0	1 (0)	0 (0)
MF	(Argentina)	28	Carlos Auzqui	3	0	2	0	0	0	5 (3)	0 (0)
DF	(United States)	31	Henry Wingo	1	0	1	0	0	0	2 (1)	0 (0)
MF	(Brazil)	50	Marquinhos	5	0	1	0	0	0	6 (5)	0 (0)
FW	(Denmark)	52	Nikolai Frederiksen	1	0	0	0	0	0	1 (1)	0 (0)
MF	(Algeria)	60	Mehdi Boudjemaa	1	0	0	0	0	0	1 (1)	0 (0)
FW	(Ivory Coast)	70	Franck Boli	2	0	2	0	0	0	4 (2)	0 (0)
GK	(Hungary)	90	Dénes Dibusz	0	0	1	0	0	0	1 (0)	0 (0)
MF	(Tunisia)	93	Aïssa Laïdouni	2	0	4	0	0	0	6 (2)	0 (0)
			TOTALS	51	2	42	1	3	0	96 (51)	3 (2)

=== Clean sheets ===
Last updated on 9 April 2023

Position	Nation	Number	Name	Nemzeti Bajnokság I	UEFA Champions League/Europa League	Magyar Kupa	Total
1	(Hungary)	90	Dénes Dibusz	9	3	0	12
2	(Hungary)	1	Ádám Bogdán	1	0	1	2
3	(Hungary)	42	Ádám Varga	0	0	0	0
4	(Hungary)	63	Marcell Kovács	0	0	0	0
5	(Hungary)	61	Szabolcs Mergl	0	0	0	0
6	(Hungary)	29	Gergő Szécsi	0	0	0	0
7	(Hungary)	62	Levente Őri	0	0	0	0
			TOTALS	10	3	1	14
