= 2021–22 Ferencvárosi TC season =

Ferencváros
2021–22 season
- Chairman: Gábor Kubatov
- Manager: Peter Stöger (until 13 December 2021); Stanislav Cherchesov
- Stadium: Groupama Arena
- Nemzeti Bajnokság I: 1st
- Magyar Kupa: Winners
- UEFA Champions League: Play-off round
- UEFA Europa League: Group stage
- Top goalscorer: League: Ryan Mmaee (13); All: Myrto Uzuni (21)
Home colours	Away colours
- All statistics correct as of 21 May 2022.

The 2021–22 Ferencvárosi TC season was the club's 123rd season in existence and the 13th consecutive season in the top flight of Hungarian football. In addition to the domestic league, Ferencváros participated in this season's editions of the Hungarian Cup and the UEFA Europa League. The season covers the period from July 30, 2021, to 14 May 2022.

== Squad ==
As of match played 15 May 2022

No.	Name	Nationality	Position	Date of birth (age)	Signed from	Signed in	Apps.	Goals
Goalkeepers
1	Ádám Bogdán	(Hungary)	GK	27 September 1987 (aged 34)	Hibernian	2020	12	0
90	Dénes Dibusz	(Hungary)	GK	16 November 1990 (aged 31)	Pécs	2014	246	0
99	Gergő Szécsi	(Hungary)	GK	7 February 1989 (aged 33)	Balmazújváros	2019	0	0
Defenders
3	Samy Mmaee	(Morocco)	DF	8 September 1996 (aged 25)	Sint-Truidense	2021	32	0
15	Adnan Kovačević	(Bosnia and Herzegovina)	DF	9 September 1993 (aged 28)	Korona Kielce	2020	26	0
17	Eldar Ćivić	(Bosnia and Herzegovina)	DF	28 May 1996 (aged 25)	Sparta Prague	2019	68	2
21	Endre Botka	(Hungary)	DF	25 August 1994 (aged 27)	Budapest Honvéd	2017	115	3
23	Lóránd Pászka	(Hungary)	DF	22 March 1996 (aged 26)	Soroksár	2022	5	0
25	Miha Blažič	(Slovenia)	DF	8 May 1993 (aged 29)	Domžale	2017	134	12
31	Henry Wingo	(United States)	DF	4 October 1995 (aged 26)	Molde	2021	33	0
33	Lasha Dvali	(Georgia (country))	DF	14 May 1995 (aged 27)	Pogoń Szczecin	2019	40	2
53	Dominik Csontos	(Hungary)	DF	8 November 2002 (aged 19)	youth sector	2020	6	1
Midfielders
5	Muhamed Bešić	(Bosnia and Herzegovina)	MF	10 September 1992 (aged 29)	Everton	2021	67	2
7	Somália	(Brazil)	MF	28 September 1988 (aged 33)	Al-Shabab	2020	129	17
13	Anderson Esiti	(Nigeria)	MF	24 May 1994 (aged 27)	PAOK	2022	9	1
16	Kristoffer Zachariassen	(Norway)	MF	27 January 1994 (aged 28)	Rosenborg	2021	25	3
18	Dávid Sigér	(Hungary)	MF	30 November 1990 (aged 31)	Balmazújváros	2018	77	8
19	Bálint Vécsei	(Hungary)	MF	13 July 1993 (aged 28)	Lugano	2020	51	3
22	Marko Marin	(Germany)	MF	13 March 1989 (aged 33)	Al Ahli	2021	17	2
27	Giorgi Kharaishvili	(Georgia (country))	MF	29 July 1996 (aged 25)	Göteborg	2021	4	1
44	Stjepan Lončar	(Bosnia and Herzegovina)	MF	10 November 1996 (aged 25)	Rijeka	2021	19	2
76	Krisztián Lisztes	(Hungary)	MF	6 May 2005 (aged 17)	youth sector	2022	1	0
93	Aïssa Laïdouni	(Tunisia)	MF	13 December 1996 (aged 25)	Voluntari	2020	54	6
Forwards
8	Ryan Mmaee	(Morocco)	FW	1 November 1997 (aged 24)	AEL Limassol	2021	21	13
10	Tokmac Nguen	(Norway)	FW	20 October 1993 (aged 28)	Strømsgodset	2019	102	32
11	Oleksandr Zubkov	(Ukraine)	FW	3 August 1996 (aged 25)	Shakhtar Donetsk	2019	73	15
14	Fortune Bassey	(Nigeria)	FW	6 October 1998 (aged 23)	České Budějovice	2021	12	2
20	Róbert Mak	(Slovakia)	FW	8 March 1991 (aged 31)	Konyaspor	2020	32	4
28	Carlos Auzqui	(Argentina)	FW	16 March 1991 (aged 31)	River Plate	2022	8	1
53	Damir Redžić	(Hungary)	FW	23 March 2003 (aged 19)	youth sector	2021	4	0
70	Franck Boli	(Ivory Coast)	FW	7 December 1993 (aged 28)	Stabæk	2019	75	25
Players away on loan
13	Ammar Ramadan	(Syria)	MF	5 January 2001 (aged 21)	youth sector	2020	1	0
24	Máté Katona	(Hungary)	MF	22 June 1997 (aged 24)	MTK Budapest	2021	0	0
42	Ádám Varga	(Hungary)	GK	12 February 1999 (aged 23)	youth sector	2016	1	0
69	Regő Szánthó	(Hungary)	FW	22 November 2000 (aged 21)	Győr	2020	7	0
88 (Note: Changed from 22 mid-season.)	Roko Baturina	(Croatia)	FW	20 June 2000 (aged 21)	Dinamo Zagreb	2020	20	4
Players who left during the season
14	Ihor Kharatin	(Ukraine)	MF	2 February 1995 (aged 26)	Zorya Luhansk	2019	71	7
23	Marijan Čabraja	(Croatia)	DF	25 February 1997 (aged 25)	loan from Dinamo Zagreb	2021	7	0
77	Myrto Uzuni	(Albania)	FW	31 May 1995 (aged 26)	Lokomotiva Zagreb	2020	42	19

== Transfers ==
=== Summer ===
In: Note: Flags indicate national team as defined under FIFA eligibility rules; some limited exceptions apply. Players may hold more than one non-FIFA nationality.

No.	Pos.	Nation	Player
1	GK	HUN	Gergő Szécsi (loan return from Soroksár)
5	MF	BIH	Muhamed Bešić (from (England) Everton)
8	FW	MAR	Ryan Mmaee (from (Cyprus) AEL Limassol)
13	MF	SYR	Ammar Ramadan (loan return from Soroksár)
16	MF	NOR	Kristoffer Zachariassen (from (Norway) Rosenborg)
22	MF	GER	Marko Marin (from (Saudi Arabia) Al Ahli)
23	DF	CRO	Marijan Čabraja (loan from (Croatia) Dinamo Zagreb)
42	GK	HUN	Ádám Varga (loan return from Soroksár)
44	MF	BIH	Stjepan Lončar (from (Croatia) Rijeka)
51	MF	HUN	András Csonka (loan return from Budafok)
52	FW	HUN	Damir Redžić (from Ferencváros U-19)
53	DF	HUN	Dominik Csontos (loan return from Soroksár)
69	FW	HUN	Regő Szánthó (loan return from Zalaegerszeg)
80	FW	SRB	Željko Gavrić (from (Serbia) Red Star Belgrade)
99	GK	HUN	Dávid Gróf (loan return from Debrecen)

Out: Note: Flags indicate national team as defined under FIFA eligibility rules; some limited exceptions apply. Players may hold more than one non-FIFA nationality.

No.	Pos.	Nation	Player
8	DF	HUN	Gergő Lovrencsics (to (Croatia) Hajduk Split)
14	MF	UKR	Ihor Kharatin (to (Poland) Legia Warsaw)
22	FW	CRO	Roko Baturina (loan to (Poland) Lech Poznań)
23	MF	HUN	Dániel Gera (loan to Puskás Akadémia)
24	MF	HUN	Máté Katona (loan to Soroksár)
26	DF	GER	Marcel Heister (to Fehérvár)
42	GK	HUN	Ádám Varga (loan to Soroksár)
51	MF	HUN	András Csonka (loan to Gyirmót)
52	FW	HUN	Damir Redžić (loan to Soroksár)
88	MF	BRA	Isael (to (Qatar) Umm Salal)
92	MF	SVK	Michal Škvarka (to (Poland) Wisła Kraków)
99	GK	HUN	Dávid Gróf (to Debrecen)

=== Winter ===
In: Note: Flags indicate national team as defined under FIFA eligibility rules; some limited exceptions apply. Players may hold more than one non-FIFA nationality.

No.	Pos.	Nation	Player
13	MF	NGR	Anderson Esiti (from (Greece) PAOK)
14	FW	NGR	Fortune Bassey (from (Czech Republic) České Budějovice)
22	FW	CRO	Roko Baturina (loan return from (Poland) Lech Poznań)
28	FW	ARG	Carlos Auzqui (from (Argentina) River Plate)
50	FW	BRA	Marquinhos (from (Brazil) Atlético Mineiro)
51	MF	HUN	András Csonka (loan return from Gyirmót)

Out: Note: Flags indicate national team as defined under FIFA eligibility rules; some limited exceptions apply. Players may hold more than one non-FIFA nationality.

No.	Pos.	Nation	Player
23	DF	CRO	Marijan Čabraja (loan return to (Croatia) Dinamo Zagreb)
51	MF	HUN	András Csonka (loan to Budafok)
77	FW	ALB	Myrto Uzuni (to (Spain) Granada)

== Pre–season and friendlies ==
Win Draw Loss Fixtures

20 June 2021 Friendly	Ferencváros	2–0	(Poland) Legia Warsaw	Kössen, Austria
17:00 CEST	Baturina 52'; Ćivić 80'	Report

23 June 2021 Friendly	Ferencváros	3–1	(Bulgaria) Ludogorets Razgrad	Kufstein, Austria
17:00 CEST	Uzuni 23'; Boli 73'; Laïdouni 87'	Report	Sotiriou 82'

25 June 2021 Friendly	Heimstetten (Germany)	0–5	Ferencváros	Grassau, Germany
18:00 CEST		Report	Boli 2'; Baturina 18'; Ramadan 25', 36'; Gera 89'

30 June 2021 Friendly	Ferencváros	1–0	(Slovakia) Dunajská Streda	Budapest, Hungary
18:00 CEST	Uzuni 76' (pen.)	Report		Stadium: Groupama Arena; Attendance: 5,097; Referee: Gergő Bogár

9 July 2021 Friendly	Balatonalmádi (Hungary)	0–14	Ferencváros	Balatonalmádi, Hungary
17:00 CEST		Report	Uzuni 3', 11'; Ćivić 15'; S. Mmaee 29'; Szánthó 31', 53', 81'; Redzic 38'; Ramadan 43', 48'; Baturina 51', 76', 85'; Gera 71'	Stadium: Városi sportpálya

== Competitions ==
=== Overview ===
Competition	First match	Last match	Starting round	Final position	Record							
Competition	First match	Last match	Starting round	Final position	Pld	W	D	L	GF	GA	GD	Win %
Nemzeti Bajnokság I	31 July 2021	14 May 2022	Matchday 1	Winner	33	22	5	6	60	31	+29	66.67
Hungarian Cup	19 September 2021	11 May 2022	Round of 64	Winner	6	6	0	0	26	1	+25	100.00
UEFA Champions League	6 July 2021	24 August 2021	First qualifying round	Play-off round	8	5	0	3	17	9	+8	62.50
UEFA Europa League	16 September 2021	9 December 2021	Group stage	4th	6	1	0	5	5	12	−7	16.67
Total					53	34	5	14	108	53	+55	64.15

Last updated: 15 May 2022
Source: Competitions

=== Nemzeti Bajnokság I ===
==== League table ====
Pos	Team	Pld	W	D	L	GF	GA	GD	Pts	Qualification or relegation
1	Ferencváros (C)	33	22	5	6	60	31	+29	71	Qualification for the Champions League first qualifying round
2	Kisvárda	33	16	11	6	50	34	+16	59	Qualification for the Europa Conference League second qualifying round (Note: Since the winners of the 2021–22 Magyar Kupa, Ferencváros, qualified for the Champions League, the Europa Conference League berth awarded to the Magyar Kupa winners was transferred to the highest-placed Nemzeti Bajnokság I team not already qualified for European competition, the fourth-placed team.)
3	Puskás Akadémia	33	14	12	7	43	34	+9	54	Qualification for the Europa Conference League second qualifying round
4	Fehérvár	33	13	9	11	48	43	+5	48	Qualification for the Europa Conference League second qualifying round
5	Újpest	33	12	8	13	50	48	+2	44	

Source: Hungarian Football Federation (in Hungarian), Soccerway
Rules for classification: 1) Points; 2) Matches won; 3) Goal difference; 4) Goals scored; 5) Head-to-head points; 6) Head-to-head goal difference; 7) Head-to-head away goals scored; 8) Fair play ranking; 9) Drawing of lots.
(C) Champions

==== Results summary ====
Overall								Home						Away					
Pld	W	D	L	GF	GA	GD	Pts	W	D	L	GF	GA	GD	W	D	L	GF	GA	GD
32	21	5	6	58	31	+27	68	10	3	4	32	21	+11	11	2	2	26	10	+16

Last updated: 15 May 2022.
Source: Soccerway

==== Results by round ====
Round	1	2	3	4	5	6	7	8	9	10	11	12	13	14	15	16	17	18	19	20	21	22	23	24	25	26	27	28	29	30	31	32	33
Ground	H	A	H	A	H	A	H	A	H	H	A	A	H	A	H	A	H	A	H	A	A	H	H	A	H	A	H	A	H	A	H	H	A
Result	L	W	W	L	W	W	W	W	L	D	W	W	W	W	D	L	W	W	L	W	D	D	W	W	W	D	W	W	W	W	W	L	W
Position	10	6	2	5	2	2	2	1	2	2	2	1	1	1	1	2	1	1	2	1	1	1	1	1	1	1	1	1	1	1	1	1	1

Updated to match(es) played on 15 May 2022. Source: Matches
A = Away; H = Home; W = Win; D = Draw; L = Loss

==== Matches ====
31 July 2021 1	Ferencváros	1–2	Kisvárda	Budapest
17:45 CEST	R. Mmaee 80' (pen.)	Report	Leoni 46'; Navrátil 64'	Stadium: Groupama Arena; Attendance: 6,139; Referee: Mihály Káprály

22 September 2021 2	Fehérvár	0–1	Ferencváros	Székesfehérvár
20:00 CEST		Report	R. Mmaee 83'	Stadium: MOL Aréna Sóstó; Attendance: 6,006; Referee: Ferenc Karakó

14 August 2021 3	Ferencváros	4–1	Mezőkövesd	Budapest
18:15 CEST	Boli 47', 90+5'; Mak 49'; Uzuni 69' (pen.)	Report	Nagy 7'	Stadium: Groupama Arena; Attendance: 5,667; Referee: Csaba Pintér

27 January 2022 4	Puskás Akadémia	1–0	Ferencváros	Felcsút
18:30 CET	Nunes 49'	Report		Stadium: Pancho Aréna; Attendance: 2,161; Referee: Tamás Bognár

28 August 2021 5	Ferencváros	4–2	Debrecen	Budapest
18:15 CEST	Mak 39', 68'; R. Mmaee 56' (pen.); Laïdouni 73'	Report	Ugrai 18', 90'	Stadium: Groupama Arena; Attendance: 7,325; Referee: Gergő Bogár

11 September 2021 6	Budapest Honvéd	0–1	Ferencváros	Budapest
14:45 CEST		Report	Nguen 16'	Stadium: Bozsik Aréna; Attendance: 4,046; Referee: Ferenc Karakó

26 September 2021 7	Ferencváros	3–1	Újpest	Budapest
17:00 CEST	R. Mmaee 5' (pen.); Nguen 42'; Uzuni 87'	Report	Tallo 47'	Stadium: Groupama Arena; Attendance: 17,349; Referee: Gergő Bogár

3 October 2021 8	Paks	1–3	Ferencváros	Paks
17:00 CEST	Kinyik 63'	Report	R. Mmaee 51' (pen.), 65'; Laïdouni 74'	Stadium: Fehérvári úti Stadion; Attendance: 4,011; Referee: Tamás Bognár

16 October 2021 9	Ferencváros	1–2	Zalaegerszeg	Budapest
17:00 CEST	Vécsei 45'	Report	Serafimov 7'; Koszta 23'	Stadium: Groupama Arena; Attendance: 8,169; Referee: Ádám Farkas

24 October 2021 10	Ferencváros	0–0	MTK Budapest	Budapest
18:00 CEST		Report		Stadium: Groupama Arena; Attendance: 6,907; Referee: Péter Solymosi

30 October 2021 11	Gyirmót	0–2	Ferencváros	Győr
19:30 CEST		Report	Uzuni 47'; Nguen 85'	Stadium: Ménfői úti Stadion; Attendance: 4,013; Referee: Csaba Pintér

7 November 2021 12	Kisvárda	0–4	Ferencváros	Kisvárda
15:30 CET		Report	Lončar 27'; Uzuni 69', 90'; Marin 74'	Stadium: Várkerti Stadion; Attendance: 3,250; Referee: Ádám Farkas

21 November 2021 13	Ferencváros	3–0	Fehérvár	Budapest
17:30 CET	Zubkov 10'; R. Mmaee 40'; Uzuni 58'	Report		Stadium: Groupama Arena; Attendance: 8,719; Referee: Balázs Berke

28 November 2021 14	Mezőkövesd	0–3	Ferencváros	Mezőkövesd
18:00 CET		Report	R. Mmaee 7' (pen.); Nguen 41'; Boli 87'	Stadium: Városi Stadion; Attendance: 2,241; Referee: Gergő Bogár

4 December 2021 15	Ferencváros	1–1	Puskás Akadémia	Budapest
15:30 CET	Laïdouni 31'	Report	Băluță 50'	Stadium: Groupama Arena; Attendance: 6,011; Referee: Sándor Andó-Szabó

12 December 2021 16	Debrecen	2–0	Ferencváros	Debrecen
16:30 CET	Bévárdi 46'; Tischler 64'	Report		Stadium: Nagyerdei Stadion; Attendance: 4,260; Referee: Gergő Bogár

18 December 2021 17	Ferencváros	1–0	Budapest Honvéd	Budapest
14:45 CET	Uzuni 90+2'	Report		Stadium: Groupama Arena; Attendance: 7,011; Referee: Zoltán Iványi

30 January 2022 18	Újpest	0–1	Ferencváros	Budapest
20:00 CET		Report	Lončar 78'	Stadium: Szusza Ferenc Stadion; Attendance: 5,523; Referee: Balázs Berke

6 February 2022 19	Ferencváros	0–3	Paks	Budapest
17:15 CET		Report	Ádám 6'; B. Szabó 31'; Haraszti 72'	Stadium: Groupama Arena; Attendance: 6,805; Referee: Sándor Andó-Szabó

13 February 2022 20	Zalaegerszeg	1–3	Ferencváros	Zalaegerszeg
17:15 CET	Špoljarić 45'	Report	Zachariassen 1'; R. Mmaee 34'; Botka 49'	Stadium: ZTE Arena; Attendance: 5,366; Referee: Ádám Farkas

19 February 2022 21	MTK Budapest	0–0	Ferencváros	Budapest
19:30 CET		Report		Stadium: Hidegkuti Nándor Stadion; Attendance: 4,826; Referee: Ferenc Karakó

26 February 2022 22	Ferencváros	1–1	Gyirmót	Budapest
19:30 CET	Bassey 45'	Report	Mak 26' (o.g.)	Stadium: Groupama Arena; Attendance: 5,887; Referee: Tamás Bognár

6 March 2022 23	Ferencváros	2–1	Kisvárda	Budapest
17:45 CET	Boli 58'; Nguen 90+1'	Report	Bumba 31' (pen.)	Stadium: Groupama Arena; Attendance: 6,727; Referee: Csaba Pintér

13 March 2022 24	Fehérvár	0–2	Ferencváros	Székesfehérvár
17:00 CET		Report	R. Mmaee 68', 90+1'	Stadium: MOL Aréna Sóstó; Attendance: 6,989; Referee: Tamás Bognár

18 March 2022 25	Ferencváros	1–0	Mezőkövesd	Budapest
20:00 CET	Nguen 3'	Report		Stadium: Groupama Arena; Attendance: 6,517; Referee: Gergő Bogár

3 April 2022 26	Puskás Akadémia	2–2	Ferencváros	Felcsút
17:00 CEST	Kozák 52'; Stronati 56'	Report	Esiti 18'; R. Mmaee 49'	Stadium: Pancho Aréna; Attendance: 3,340; Referee: Ferenc Karakó

9 April 2022 27	Ferencváros	3–0	Debrecen	Budapest
19:30 CEST	Nguen 8'; Marquinhos 39'; Zachariassen 73'	Report		Stadium: Groupama Arena; Attendance: 9,137; Referee: Balázs Berke

16 April 2022 28	Budapest Honvéd	1–2	Ferencváros	Budapest
19:30 CEST	Zsótér 35'	Report	R. Mmaee 8'; Zachariassen 90+1'	Stadium: Bozsik Aréna; Attendance: 4,062; Referee: Sándor Andó-Szabó

24 April 2022 29	Ferencváros	2–1	Újpest	Budapest
17:30 CEST	Nguen 19'; Vécsei 39'; Stjepan Lončar (red card) 90+3'	Report	Zivzivadze 6' (pen.)	Stadium: Groupama Arena; Attendance: 20,155; Referee: Ferenc Karakó

29 April 2022 30	Paks	1–2	Ferencváros	Paks
20:00 CEST (UTC+2)	Lenzsér 7'; Kovács (yellow card) 28'; Kinyik (yellow card) 37'; Kesztyűs (yellow card) 83'	Report	Bešić 20'; Laïdouni (yellow card) 39'; Vécsei (yellow card) 77'; Auzqui 90+2'	Stadium: Fehérvári úti Stadion; Attendance: 4,201; Referee: Balázs Berke

4 May 2022 31	Ferencváros	5–3	Zalaegerszeg	Budapest
18:30 CEST	Bedi 8' (o.g.); Nguen 21' (pen.); Botka 27'; Boli 78'; Marin 90+4'	Report	Tajti 53'; Zsóri 66' (pen.), 87'	Stadium: Groupama Arena; Attendance: 5,677; Referee: Csaba Pintér

7 May 2022 32	Ferencváros	0–3	MTK Budapest	Budapest
19:15 CEST		Report	Futács 60', 90+3'; Miovski 84'	Stadium: Groupama Arena; Attendance: 13,199; Referee: Gergő Bogár

14 May 2022 33	Gyirmót	1–2	Ferencváros	Győr
14:45 CEST	Varga 57'	Report	Bassey 46'; Ćivić 78'	Stadium: Ménfői úti Stadion; Attendance: 2,628; Referee: Péter Zierkelbach

=== Hungarian Cup ===
19 September 2021 Round of 64	Hatvan	0–9	Ferencváros	Hatvan
15:00 CEST (UTC+2)		Report	Uzuni 34', 40', 50', 59', 76' (pen.), 82'; Gera 70'; Gavrić 74'; Lončar 86'	Stadium: Népkert Sporttelep; Attendance: 2,000; Referee: János Takács

27 October 2021 Round of 32	Tököl	0–7	Ferencváros	Tököl
13:30 CEST (UTC+2)		Report	Zubkov 12', 42'; Uzuni 15' (pen.), 19' (pen.); Zachariassen 26', 45'; Mak 83'	Stadium: Városi Sporttelep; Attendance: 1,000; Referee: Tamás Nazsa

9 February 2022 Round of 16	Vasas	0–2	Ferencváros	Budapest
20:00 CET (UTC+1)		Report	Botka 9'; R. Mmaee 73'	Stadium: Illovszky Rudolf Stadion; Attendance: 4,011; Referee: Mihály Káprály

1 March 2022 Quarter-finals	Budapest Honvéd	0–1	Ferencváros	Budapest
20:00 CET (UTC+1)		Report	Nguen 23'	Stadium: Bozsik Aréna; Attendance: 3,701; Referee: Balázs Berke

20 April 2022 Semi-finals	Győr	1–4	Ferencváros	Győr
20:00 CEST (UTC+2)	Bacsa 73'	Report	Boli 23', 52'; Zachariassen 32'; Lipták 78' (o.g.)	Stadium: ETO Park; Attendance: 6,150; Referee: József Erdős

11 May 2022 Final	Ferencváros	3–0	Paks	Budapest
19:30 CEST (UTC+2)	Zachariassen 16'; Lončar (yellow card) 68'; Botka (yellow card) 75'; Boli 83', 86'	Report	Windecker (yellow card) 60'; Lenzsér (yellow card) 65'; Ádám (yellow card) 90+2'	Stadium: Puskás Aréna; Attendance: 38,979; Referee: Tamás Bognár

=== UEFA Champions League ===
==== First qualifying round ====
6 July 2021 First leg	Ferencváros (Hungary)	3–0	(Kosovo) Prishtina	Ferencváros Stadion, Budapest
18:00	Nguen 71'; R. Mmaee 74'; Blažič 78'	Report		Attendance: 8,765; Referee: David Munro (Scotland)

13 July 2021 Second leg	Prishtina (Kosovo)	1–3 (1–6 agg.)	(Hungary) Ferencváros	Fadil Vokrri Stadium, Pristina
20:00	Hoti 67'	Report	Uzuni 49', 80', 86'	Attendance: 0 (Note: Due to the COVID-19 pandemic in Europe, the match was played behind closed doors.); Referee: Laurent Kopriwa (Luxembourg)

==== Second qualifying round ====
20 July 2021 First leg	Ferencváros (Hungary)	2–0	(Lithuania) Žalgiris	Ferencváros Stadion, Budapest
20:00	Uzuni 25'; Nguen 39'	Report		Attendance: 10,107; Referee: Giorgi Kruashvili (Georgia)

27 July 2021 Second leg	Žalgiris (Lithuania)	1–3 (1–5 agg.)	(Hungary) Ferencváros	LFF Stadium, Vilnius
19:00 (20:00 EEST)	Diaw 90+3'	Report	R. Mmaee 44', 72'; Mak 90+4'	Attendance: 2,032; Referee: Erik Lambrechts (Belgium)

==== Third qualifying round ====
4 August 2021 First leg	Ferencváros (Hungary)	2–0	(Czech Republic) Slavia Prague	Ferencváros Stadion, Budapest
20:00	Kacharaba 44' (o.g.); Kharatin 50' (pen.)	Report		Attendance: 17,127; Referee: Jesús Gil Manzano (Spain)

10 August 2021 Second leg	Slavia Prague (Czech Republic)	1–0 (1–2 agg.)	(Hungary) Ferencváros	Sinobo Stadium, Prague
19:00	Masopust 36'	Report		Attendance: 15,238; Referee: Tobias Stieler (Germany)

==== Play-off round ====
18 August 2021 First leg	Young Boys (Switzerland)	3–2	(Hungary) Ferencváros	Wankdorf Stadium, Bern
21:00	Elia 16'; Sierro 40'; Garcia 65'	Report	Boli 14', 82'	Attendance: 15,652; Referee: Willie Collum (Scotland)

24 August 2021 Second leg	Ferencváros (Hungary)	2–3 (4–6 agg.)	(Switzerland) Young Boys	Ferencváros Stadion, Budapest
21:00	Wingo 18'; R. Mmaee 27'	Report	Zesiger 5'; Fassnacht 56'; Mambimbi 90+3'	Attendance: 20,667; Referee: Sergei Karasev (Russia)

=== UEFA Europa League ===
==== Group stage ====
Pos	Team	Pld	W	D	L	GF	GA	GD	Pts	Qualification	LEV	BET	CEL	FER
1	(Germany) Bayer Leverkusen	6	4	1	1	14	5	+9	13	Advance to round of 16	—	4–0	3–2	2–1
2	(Spain) Real Betis	6	3	1	2	12	12	0	10	Advance to knockout round play-offs	1–1	—	4–3	2–0
3	(Scotland) Celtic	6	3	0	3	13	15	−2	9	Transfer to Europa Conference League	0–4	3–2	—	2–0
4	(Hungary) Ferencváros	6	1	0	5	5	12	−7	3		1–0	1–3	2–3	—

Source: UEFA
Rules for classification: Group stage tiebreakers

16 September 2021 1	Bayer Leverkusen (Germany)	2–1	(Hungary) Ferencváros	Leverkusen
18:45 CEST	Palacios 37'; Wirtz 69'	Report	R. Mmaee 8'	Stadium: BayArena; Attendance: 11,013; Referee: Andris Treimanis (Latvia)

30 September 2021 2	Ferencváros (Hungary)	1–3	(Spain) Real Betis	Budapest
21:00 CEST	Uzuni 44'	Report	Fekir 17'; Wingo 76' (o.g.); Tello 90+5'	Stadium: Ferencváros Stadion; Attendance: 16,759; Referee: Roi Reinshreiber (Israel)

19 October 2021 3	Celtic (Scotland)	2–0	(Hungary) Ferencváros	Glasgow
15:30 BST	Furuhashi 57'; Vécsei 81' (o.g.)	Report		Stadium: Celtic Park; Attendance: 50,427; Referee: Jakob Kehlet (Denmark)

4 November 2021 4	Ferencváros (Hungary)	2–3	(Scotland) Celtic	Budapest
20:00 GMT	Juranović 11' (o.g.); Uzuni 86'	Report	Furuhashi 3'; Jota 23'; Abada 60'	Stadium: Groupama Arena; Referee: Fábio Veríssimo (Portugal)

25 November 2021 5	Real Betis (Spain)	2–0	(Hungary) Ferencváros	Seville, Spain
18:45 CET	Tello 5'; Canales 52'	Report		Stadium: Benito Villamarín; Referee: Ruddy Buquet (France)

9 December 2021 6	Ferencváros (Hungary)	1–0	(Germany) Bayer Leverkusen	Budapest
21:00 CET	Laïdouni 82'	Report		Stadium: Ferencváros Stadion; Attendance: 12,127; Referee: Kirill Levnikov (Russia)

=== Appearances and goals ===
Last updated on 15 May 2022.

No.	Pos	Nat	Player	Total		OTP Bank Liga		UEFA CL/EL		Hungarian Cup	
No.	Pos	Nat	Player	Apps	Goals	Apps	Goals	Apps	Goals	Apps	Goals
1	GK	(Hungary) HUN	Ádám Bogdán	11	-12	7	-9	1	-3	3	-0
3	DF	(Morocco) MAR	Samy Mmaee	38	0	23	0	11	0	4	0
5	MF	(Bosnia and Herzegovina) BIH	Muhamed Bešić	22	1	20	1	0	0	2	0
7	MF	(Brazil) BRA	Somália	18	0	6	0	10	0	2	0
8	FW	(Morocco) MAR	Ryan Mmaee	37	19	21	13	14	5	2	1
10	FW	(Norway) NOR	Tokmac Nguen	43	12	28	9	12	2	3	1
11	FW	(Ukraine) UKR	Oleksandr Zubkov	34	3	20	1	11	0	3	2
13	MF	(Nigeria) NGR	Anderson Esiti	12	1	9	1	0	0	3	0
14	FW	(Nigeria) NGR	Fortune Bassey	14	2	12	2	0	0	2	0
15	DF	(Bosnia and Herzegovina) BIH	Adnan Kovačević	29	0	20	0	6	0	3	0
16	MF	(Norway) NOR	Kristoffer Zachariassen	41	7	25	3	11	0	5	4
17	DF	(Bosnia and Herzegovina) BIH	Eldar Ćivić	37	1	25	1	10	0	2	0
18	MF	(Hungary) HUN	Dávid Sigér	6	0	3	0	3	0	0	0
19	MF	(Hungary) HUN	Bálint Vécsei	38	2	25	2	10	0	3	0
20	FW	(Slovakia) SVK	Róbert Mak	25	5	13	3	9	1	3	1
21	DF	(Hungary) HUN	Endre Botka	35	3	25	2	6	0	4	1
22	MF	(Germany) GER	Marko Marin	19	2	17	2	0	0	2	0
23	DF	(Hungary) HUN	Lóránd Pászka	7	0	5	0	0	0	2	0
25	DF	(Slovenia) SLO	Miha Blažič	44	1	26	0	14	1	4	0
28	RW	(Argentina) ARG	Carlos Auzqui	11	1	8	1	0	0	3	0
29	GK	(Hungary) HUN	Gergő Szécsi	0	0	0	-0	0	-0	0	-0
31	DF	(United States) USA	Henry Wingo	36	1	21	0	12	1	3	0
33	DF	(Georgia (country)) GEO	Lasha Dvali	6	0	4	0	1	0	1	0
44	MF	(Bosnia and Herzegovina) BIH	Stjepan Lončar	32	3	19	2	8	0	5	1
50	FW	(Brazil) BRA	Marquinhos	9	1	8	1	0	0	1	0
52	FW	(Hungary) HUN	Damir Redžić	3	0	2	0	1	0	0	0
53	DF	(Hungary) HUN	Dominik Csontos	6	0	3	0	1	0	2	0
69	FW	(Hungary) HUN	Regő Szánthó	11	0	6	0	3	0	2	0
70	FW	(Ivory Coast) CIV	Franck Boli	27	11	19	5	4	2	4	4
76	MF	(Hungary) HUN	Krisztián Lisztes	1	0	1	0	0	0	0	0
80	FW	(Serbia) SRB	Željko Gavrić	15	1	10	0	2	0	3	1
88 (Note: Changed from 22 mid-season.)	FW	(Croatia) CRO	Roko Baturina	1	0	0	0	1	0	0	0
90	GK	(Hungary) HUN	Dénes Dibusz	42	-41	26	-22	13	-18	3	-1
93	MF	(Tunisia) TUN	Aïssa Laïdouni	41	4	27	3	9	1	5	0
Youth players:
20	MF	(Hungary) HUN	Leandro	1	0	0	0	0	0	1	0
27	FW	(Hungary) HUN	Zalán Gera	1	1	0	0	0	0	1	1
61	GK	(Hungary) HUN	Szabolcs Mergl	0	0	0	-0	0	-0	0	-0
69	DF	(Hungary) HUN	Márk Könczey	1	0	0	0	0	0	1	0
Out to loan:
23	MF	(Hungary) HUN	Dániel Gera	0	0	0	0	0	0	0	0
24	MF	(Hungary) HUN	Máté Katona	0	0	0	0	0	0	0	0
42	GK	(Hungary) HUN	Ádám Varga	0	0	0	0	0	0	0	0
51	MF	(Hungary) HUN	András Csonka	0	0	0	0	0	0	0	0
57	DF	(Hungary) HUN	Patrick Iyinbor	0	0	0	0	0	0	0	0
Players no longer at the club:
14	MF	(Ukraine) UKR	Ihor Kharatin	9	1	2	0	7	1	0	0
23	DF	(Croatia) CRO	Marijan Čabraja	13	0	7	0	4	0	2	0
77	FW	(Albania) ALB	Myrto Uzuni	31	21	16	7	13	6	2	8

=== Top scorers ===
Includes all competitive matches. The list is sorted by shirt number when total goals are equal.

Last updated on 15 May 2022

Position	Nation	Number	Name	OTP Bank Liga	UEFA CL/EL	Hungarian Cup	Total
1	(Albania)	77	Myrto Uzuni	7	6	8	21
2	(Morocco)	8	Ryan Mmaee	13	5	1	19
3	(Norway)	10	Tokmac Nguen	9	2	1	12
4	(Ivory Coast)	70	Franck Boli	5	2	4	11
5	(Norway)	16	Kristoffer Zachariassen	3	0	4	7
6	(Slovakia)	20	Róbert Mak	3	1	1	5
7	(Tunisia)	93	Aïssa Laïdouni	3	1	0	4
8	(Bosnia and Herzegovina)	44	Stjepan Lončar	2	0	1	3
9	(Hungary)	21	Endre Botka	2	0	1	3
10	(Ukraine)	11	Oleksandr Zubkov	1	0	2	3
11	(Hungary)	19	Bálint Vécsei	2	0	0	2
12	(Germany)	22	Marko Marin	2	0	0	2
13	(Nigeria)	14	Fortune Bassey	2	0	0	2
14	(Slovenia)	25	Miha Blažič	0	1	0	1
15	(Ukraine)	14	Ihor Kharatin	0	1	0	1
16	(United States)	31	Henry Wingo	0	1	0	1
17	(Nigeria)	13	Anderson Esiti	1	0	0	1
18	(Brazil)	50	Marquinhos	1	0	0	1
19	(Bosnia and Herzegovina)	5	Muhamed Bešić	1	0	0	1
20	(Argentina)	28	Carlos Auzqui	1	0	0	1
21	(Bosnia and Herzegovina)	17	Eldar Ćivić	1	0	0	1
22	(Hungary)	27	Zalán Gera	0	0	1	1
23	(Serbia)	80	Željko Gavrić	0	0	1	1
/	/	/	Own Goals	1	2	1	4
			TOTALS	60	22	26	108

=== Disciplinary record ===
Includes all competitive matches. Players with 1 card or more included only.

Last updated on 15 May 2022

Position	Nation	Number	Name	OTP Bank Liga		UEFA CL/EL		Hungarian Cup		Total (Hu Total)	
Position	Nation	Number	Name	Yellow card	Red card	Yellow card	Red card	Yellow card	Red card	Yellow card	Red card
DF	(Morocco)	3	Samy Mmaee	5	0	2	0	0	0	7 (5)	0 (0)
MF	(Bosnia and Herzegovina)	5	Muhamed Bešić	5	1	0	0	0	0	5 (5)	1 (1)
MF	(Brazil)	7	Somália	0	0	1	0	1	0	2 (0)	0 (0)
FW	(Morocco)	8	Ryan Mmaee	5	0	2	0	0	0	7 (5)	0 (0)
FW	(Norway)	10	Tokmac Nguen	7	0	0	0	0	0	7 (7)	0 (0)
FW	(Ukraine)	11	Oleksandr Zubkov	3	0	0	0	0	0	3 (3)	0 (0)
MF	(Nigeria)	13	Anderson Esiti	2	0	0	0	0	0	2 (2)	0 (0)
MF	(Ukraine)	14	Ihor Kharatin	0	0	3	0	0	0	3 (0)	0 (0)
FW	(Nigeria)	14	Fortune Bassey	1	0	0	0	0	0	1 (1)	0 (0)
DF	(Bosnia and Herzegovina)	15	Adnan Kovačević	3	0	2	0	0	0	5 (3)	0 (0)
MF	(Norway)	16	Kristoffer Zachariassen	3	0	2	0	0	0	5 (3)	0 (0)
DF	(Bosnia and Herzegovina)	17	Eldar Ćivić	2	0	0	1	0	0	2 (2)	1 (0)
MF	(Hungary)	18	Dávid Sigér	0	0	1	0	0	0	1 (0)	0 (0)
MF	(Hungary)	19	Bálint Vécsei	8	0	1	0	0	0	9 (8)	0 (0)
MF	(Slovakia)	20	Róbert Mak	2	0	1	0	0	0	3 (2)	0 (0)
DF	(Hungary)	21	Endre Botka	5	1	1	0	2	0	8 (5)	1 (1)
MF	(Germany)	22	Marko Marin	1	0	0	0	0	0	1 (1)	0 (0)
DF	(Croatia)	23	Marijan Čabraja	1	0	1	0	0	0	2 (1)	0 (0)
DF	(Slovenia)	25	Miha Blažič	6	0	3	0	0	0	9 (6)	0 (0)
DF	(United States)	31	Henry Wingo	4	0	1	0	0	0	5 (4)	0 (0)
MF	(Bosnia and Herzegovina)	44	Stjepan Lončar	3	1	0	0	2	0	5 (3)	1 (1)
MF	(Brazil)	50	Marquinhos	1	0	0	0	0	0	1 (1)	0 (0)
FW	(Hungary)	52	Damir Redzic	1	0	0	0	0	0	1 (1)	0 (0)
DF	(Hungary)	53	Dominik Csontos	1	0	1	0	0	0	2 (1)	0 (0)
FW	(Hungary)	69	Regő Szánthó	1	0	0	0	0	0	1 (1)	0 (0)
FW	(Ivory Coast)	70	Franck Boli	2	0	0	0	0	0	2 (2)	0 (0)
FW	(Albania)	77	Myrto Uzuni	2	0	1	0	0	0	3 (2)	0 (0)
FW	(Serbia)	80	Željko Gavrić	2	0	0	0	0	0	2 (2)	0 (0)
GK	(Hungary)	90	Dénes Dibusz	0	0	1	0	0	0	1 (0)	0 (0)
MF	(Tunisia)	93	Aïssa Laïdouni	6	0	4	1	1	0	11 (6)	1 (0)
			TOTALS	82	3	28	2	6	0	116 (82)	5 (3)

=== Clean sheets ===
Last updated on 15 May 2022

Position	Nation	Number	Name	OTP Bank Liga	UEFA Champions League	Hungarian Cup	Total
1	(Hungary)	90	Dénes Dibusz	11	4	2	17
2	(Hungary)	1	Ádám Bogdán	2	0	3	5
3	(Hungary)	61	Szabolcs Mergl	0	0	0	0
4	(Hungary)	42	Ádám Varga	0	0	0	0
5	(Hungary)	29	Gergő Szécsi	0	0	0	0
			TOTALS	13	4	5	22

== Ferencváros II ==
=== Nemzeti Bajnokság III ===
==== Results summary ====
Overall								Home						Away					
Pld	W	D	L	GF	GA	GD	Pts	W	D	L	GF	GA	GD	W	D	L	GF	GA	GD
3	2	1	0	6	2	+4	7	2	0	0	6	2	+4	0	1	0	0	0	0

Last updated: 15 August 2021.
Source: MLSZ

==== Results by round ====
Round	1	2	3	4	5	6	7	8	9	10	11	12	13	14	15	16	17	18	19	20	21	22	23	24	25	26	27	28	29	30	31	32	33	34	35	36	37	38
Ground	H	A	H																																			
Result	W	D	W																																			
Position	6	6	3																																			

Updated to match(es) played on 15 August 2021. Source: Matches
A = Away; H = Home; W = Win; D = Draw; L = Loss

==== Matches ====
1 August 2021 1	Ferencváros II	2–1	Iváncsa	Budapest
11:00 CEST	Ramadan 46', 66'	Report	Domokos 34'	Stadium: Népligeti Sportcentrum; Referee: Balázs Katona

11 August 2021 2	MTK Budapest II	0–0	Ferencváros II	Budapest
17:30 CEST		Report		Stadium: Hidegkuti Nándor Stadion; Referee: Tibor Valu

15 August 2021 3	Ferencváros II	4–1	Rákosmente	Budapest
11:00 CEST	Jones 7', 39'; Gera 88'; Ramadan 90+3'	Report	Vattai 51'	Stadium: Népligeti Sportcentrum; Referee: Márió Zimmermann
