= Kristoffer Zachariassen =

Norwegian footballer (born 1994)

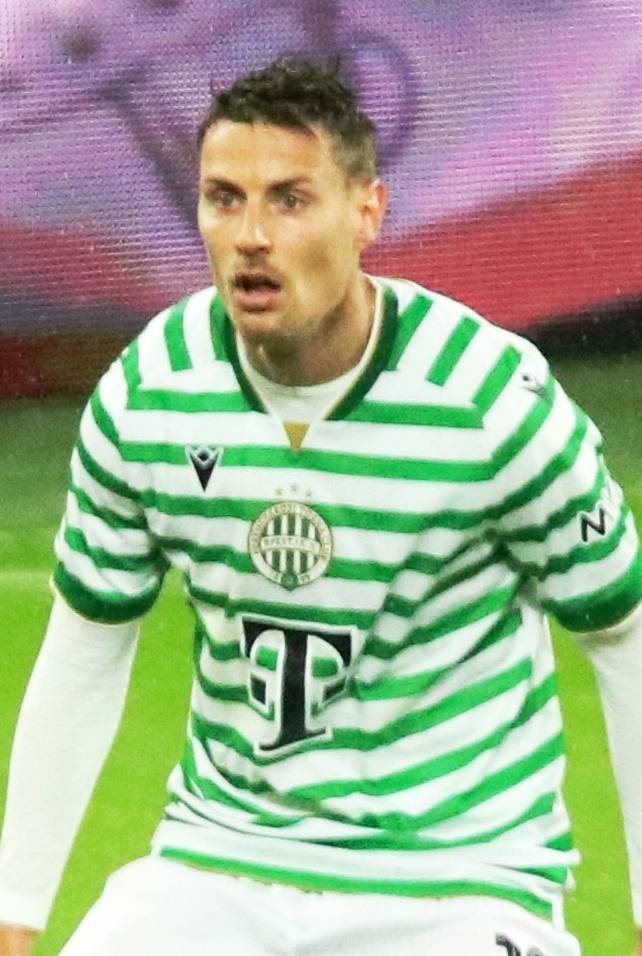
- Zachariassen with Ferencváros in 2025

Personal information
- Date of birth: 27 January 1994 (age 32)
- Place of birth: Sotra, Norway
- Height: 1.80 m (5 ft 11 in)
- Position: Midfielder

Team information
- Current team: Ferencváros
- Number: 16

Senior career*
Years	Team	Apps	(Gls)
2012–2017	Nest-Sotra	104	(20)
2017–2019	Sarpsborg 08	84	(18)
2020–2021	Rosenborg	41	(20)
2021–	Ferencváros	135	(22)

International career^{‡}
2021–2022	Norway	3	(0)
- * Club domestic league appearances and goals as of 6 November 2026 ‡ National team caps and goals as of 20 November 2022

Kristoffer Zachariassen (born 27 January 1994) is a Norwegian professional footballer who plays as a midfielder for Ferencváros.

== Club career ==
=== Ferencváros ===
On 15 July 2021, Zachariassen signed a contract with Hungarian side Ferencváros.

On 5 May 2023, he won the 2022–23 Nemzeti Bajnokság I with Ferencváros, after Kecskemét lost 1–0 to Honvéd at the Bozsik Aréna on the 30th matchday.

On 6 August 2023, he scored his first goal in the 2023–24 Nemzeti Bajnokság I season against Fehérvár FC at the Sóstói Stadion.

He said in an interview with Nemzeti Sport, that Ferencváros should beat FK Čukarički in the first match day of the 2023–24 UEFA Europa Conference League.

In an interview with Nemzeti Sport, he said that Ferencváros should not be afraid of Kecskemét, finished second in the 2022–23 Nemzeti Bajnokság I, ahead of the match at Széktói Stadion against Kecskemét in the 2023–24 Nemzeti Bajnokság I. Finally, his fear was warranted since Kecskemét beat Ferencváros 2–1 on 5 November 2023.

In an interview with Nemzeti Sport, he said that Ferencváros must beat Cukaricki if they want advance to the knockout stage. On 30 November 2023, he scored the equalizer against FK Čukarički on the fifth match day of the 2023–24 UEFA Europa Conference League match. The match, finally, was won by Ferecváros 2–1 thanks to a late goal by Aleksandar Pešić.

On the last match day of the 2023–24 UEFA Europa Conference League, Zachariassen scored a goal against ACF Fiorentina. The match ended with a 1–1 draw which meant that Ferencváros finished second in their group and qualified for the knockout stage.

On 3 April 2024, he scored twice in a Magyar Kupa match against Diósgyőri VTK at the Diósgyőri Stadion in the 2023–24 Magyar Kupa season.

On 20 April 2024, the Ferencváros–Kisvárda tie ended with a goalless draw at the Groupama Aréna on the 29th match day of the 2023–24 Nemzeti Bajnokság I season which meant that Ferencváros won their 35th championship.

On 15 May 2024, Ferencváros were defeated by Paks 2–0 in the 2024 Magyar Kupa Final at the Puskás Aréna.

On 7 November 2024, he scored the second goal in a 4-0 victory over FC Dynamo Kyiv on the fourth match day of the 2024–25 UEFA Europa League league phase.

Zachariassen won the 2024–25 Nemzeti Bajnokság I season with Ferencváros after beating Győr 2–1 at the ETO Park on the last match day on 24 May 2025. On 9 May 2026, he won the 2025–26 Magyar Kupa season with Ferencváros by beating Zalaegerszegi TE 1–0 in the 2026 Magyar Kupa final at Puskás Aréna.

On 13 August 2026, he played a crucial role in the equalizer against Górnik Zabrze in the round of the 2026–27 UEFA Europa League qualifying. After the match, Marius Corbu said that "Many people may not realize how valuable his play is, because he’s not the type to pull off flashy moves or dribble his way through the field. However, anyone who understands soccer knows exactly that what he does sets an example worth following. That’s exactly what a professional soccer player should be like!”

== International career ==
Zachariassen made his debut for the Norway national team on 6 June 2021 in a friendly against Greece. He started the game and was substituted at half-time with Norway down 2–0 at home. The game finished with a 2–1 loss.

== Career statistics ==
=== Club ===
As of match played 5 November 2026

Appearances and goals by club, season and competition
Club	Season	League			National cup (Note: Includes Norwegian Football Cup, Magyar Kupa)		Continental		Total	
Club	Season	Division	Apps	Goals	Apps	Goals	Apps	Goals	Apps	Goals
Nest-Sotra	2012	Norwegian Second Division	3	0	1	0	–		4	0
Nest-Sotra	2013	Norwegian Second Division	19	3	1	0	–		20	1
Nest-Sotra	2014	Norwegian First Division	29	5	2	0	–		31	5
Nest-Sotra	2015	Norwegian First Division	29	4	2	0	–		31	4
Nest-Sotra	2016	Norwegian Second Division	24	8	4	0	–		28	8
Nest-Sotra	Total		104	20	10	0	–		114	20
Sarpsborg 08	2017	Eliteserien	29	8	5	2	–		34	10
Sarpsborg 08	2018	Eliteserien	26	4	2	0	13 (Note: Appearances in UEFA Europa League)	3	41	7
Sarpsborg 08	2019	Eliteserien	29	6	3	0	–		32	6
Sarpsborg 08	Total		84	18	10	2	13	3	107	23
Rosenborg	2020	Eliteserien	29	12	0	0	4	1	33	13
Rosenborg	2021	Eliteserien	12	8	0	0	0	0	12	8
Rosenborg	Total		41	20	0	0	4	1	45	21
Ferencváros	2021–22	Nemzeti Bajnokság I	25	3	5	4	11 (Note: Five appearances in UEFA Champions League, six appearances in UEFA Europa League)	0	40	7
Ferencváros	2022–23	Nemzeti Bajnokság I	27	7	1	1	14 (Note: Six appearances and two goals in UEFA Champions League, eight appearances and three goals in UEFA Europa League)	5	42	13
Ferencváros	2023–24	Nemzeti Bajnokság I	28	6	1	1	16 (Note: Two appearances in UEFA Champions League, fourteen appearances and four goals in UEFA Europa Conference League)	4	45	11
Ferencváros	2024–25	Nemzeti Bajnokság I	26	0	5	3	16 (Note: Four appearances and two goals in UEFA Champions League, twelve appearances and one goal in UEFA Europa League)	3	47	6
Ferencváros	2025–26	Nemzeti Bajnokság I	19	2	6	2	13 (Note: Three appearances and one goals in UEFA Champions League, ten appearances and two goal in UEFA Europa League)	3	38	7
Ferencváros	2026–27	Nemzeti Bajnokság I	10	4	1	1	12 (Note: Twelve appearances and six goal in UEFA Europa League)	6	23	11
Ferencváros	Total		135	22	19	12	82	21	236	55
Career total			364	80	39	14	99	25	502	119

== Honours ==
Sarpsborg 08

- Norwegian Football Cup runner-up: 2017

Ferencváros

- Nemzeti Bajnokság I: 2021–22, 2022–23, 2023–24, 2024–25
- Hungarian Cup: 2021–22, 2025–26

Individual

- Eliteserien Player of the Month: May 2021

== Personal life ==
It was revealed by Nemzeti Sport that Zachariassen will get Hungarian citizenship in 2026.
