= Bálint Vécsei =

Hungarian footballer

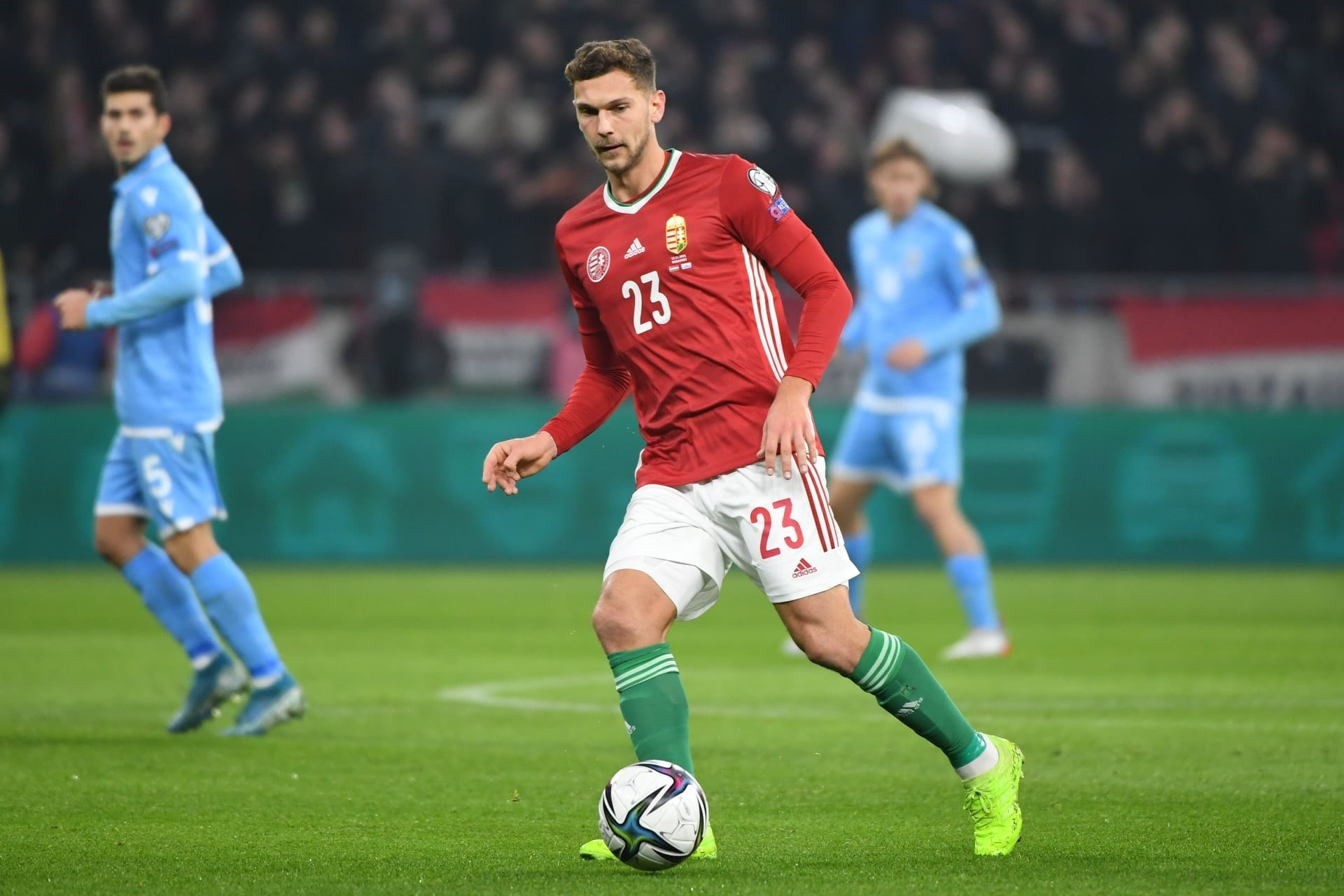
- Vécsei with Hungary in 2021

Personal information
- Full name: Bálint Máté Vécsei
- Date of birth: 13 July 1993 (age 33)
- Place of birth: Miskolc, Hungary
- Height: 1.85 m (6 ft 1 in)
- Position: Midfielder

Team information
- Current team: Paksi FC
- Number: 5

Youth career
- 2003–2008: Kazincbarcika
- 2008–2010: Honvéd

Senior career*
Years	Team	Apps	(Gls)
2010–2015	Honvéd	90	(9)
2015–2018	Bologna	0	(0)
2015–2016	→ Lecce (loan)	19	(1)
2016–2018	→ Lugano (loan)	43	(0)
2018–2020	Lugano	44	(4)
2020–2023	Ferencváros	70	(4)
2023	Vissel Kobe	2	(0)
2024–	Paks	58	(2)

International career^{‡}
2011–2012	Hungary U-19	8	(2)
2012–2014	Hungary U-21	12	(1)
2014–	Hungary	13	(2)
- * Club domestic league appearances and goals as of 30 May 2026 ‡ National team caps and goals as of 23 March 2025

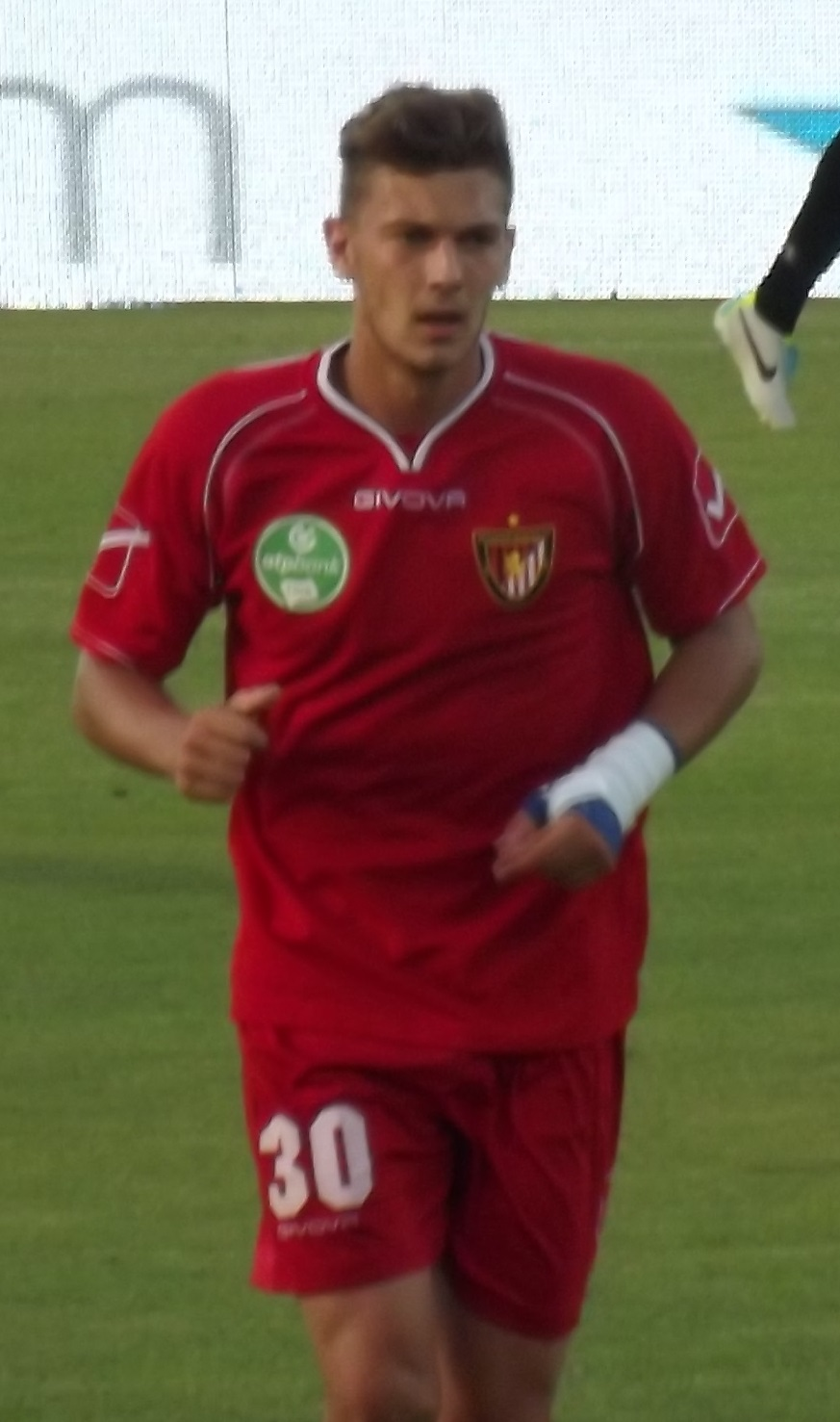
Vécsei playing for Budapest Honvéd

Bálint Máté Vécsei (born 13 July 1993) is a Hungarian professional footballer who plays as a midfielder for Hungarian club Paksi FC and the Hungary national team.

== Club career ==
He started playing football at the Kazinczy Ferenc elementary school in Kazincbarcika. Since his father is a geography-physical education teacher, he immediately fell in love with football. Vécsei started his career in the Kazincbarcikai SC's youth team.

=== Budapest Honvéd ===
On 28 July 2008, Budapest Honvéd signed him. On 11 May 2011, he played his first Hungarian League match against Győri. In the 2012–13 season of the Hungarian League Vécsei played 28 matches and scored four goals.

=== Bologna ===
On 18 August 2015, he was signed by the Serie A club Bologna F.C. 1909. At the same time he was loaned to U.S. Lecce.

==== Lugano ====
On 13 July 2016, Vécsei joined Swiss club Lugano on a season-long loan deal. During his time at Lugano he provided a man of the match performance against FC Sion with two goals, in the 77th and 92nd minute.

=== Ferencváros ===
On 29 December 2019, he signed to Hungary with Ferencváros. Officially available to the club on 1 January 2020.

On 16 June 2020, he became champion with Ferencváros by beating Budapest Honvéd FC at the Hidegkuti Nándor Stadion on the 30th match day of the 2019–20 Nemzeti Bajnokság I season.

On 5 May 2023, he won the 2022–23 Nemzeti Bajnokság I with Ferencváros, after Kecskemét lost 1–0 to Honvéd at the Bozsik Aréna on the 30th matchday.

=== Vissel Kobe ===
On 2 September 2023, it was announced that Vécsei has joined Vissel Kobe and was given squad number 6. In November 2023, Vécsei became J1 League champion with Kobe.

On 30 December 2023, it was officially announced that Vissel Kobe did not want to lengthen their contract with Vécsei.

=== Paks ===
On 14 May 2025, he won the 2025 Magyar Kupa final with Paksi FC after beating Ferencvárosi TC 4–3 on penalty shoot-out.

On 17 July 2025, he missed two penalties in a 3–0 defeat from CFR Cluj in the 2025–26 UEFA Europa League season.

== International career ==
On 27 March 2023, he scored his first goal against Bulgaria in a 3–0 victory for Hungary in the UEFA Euro 2024 qualifying at the Puskás Aréna.

In an interview with Bence Szabó, published in Sportrádió Hazafutás, he said that he wants to play at the UEFA Euro 2024.

== Career statistics ==
=== Club ===
As of match played 24 August 2025

Appearances and goals by club, season and competition
Club	Season	League			National cup (Note: Includes Magyar Kupa, Coppa Italia, Swiss Cup)		League cup (Note: Includes Ligakupa)		Continental		Total	
Club	Season	Division	Apps	Goals	Apps	Goals	Apps	Goals	Apps	Goals	Apps	Goals
Honvéd	2010–11	Nemzeti Bajnokság I	3	0	0	0	0	0	—		3	0
Honvéd	2011–12	Nemzeti Bajnokság I	8	0	2	1	0	0	—		10	1
Honvéd	2012–13	Nemzeti Bajnokság I	25	4	3	0	1	0	1	0	30	4
Honvéd	2013–14	Nemzeti Bajnokság I	28	5	1	0	1	0	2	0	32	5
Honvéd	2014–15	Nemzeti Bajnokság I	21	0	1	0	2	0	—		24	0
Honvéd	2015–16	Nemzeti Bajnokság I	5	0	0	0	0	0	0	0	5	0
Honvéd	Total		90	9	7	1	4	0	3	0	104	10
Bologna	2015–16	Serie A	0	0	0	0	—		—		0	0
Bologna	2016–17	Serie A	0	0	0	0	—		—		0	0
Bologna	2017–18	Serie A	0	0	0	0	—		—		0	0
Bologna	Total		0	0	0	0	0	0	0	0	0	0
Lecce (loan)	2015–16	Lega Pro	19	1	2	1	—		—		21	2
Lugano (loan)	2016–17	Swiss Super League	19	0	2	0	—		—		21	0
Lugano (loan)	2017–18	Swiss Super League	24	0	1	1	—		3 (Note: Appearances in UEFA Europa League)	1	28	2
Lugano	2018–19	Swiss Super League	30	1	1	0	—		—		31	1
Lugano	2019–20	Swiss Super League	14	3	0	0	—		4	0	18	3
Lugano	Total		87	4	4	1	0	0	7	1	98	6
Ferencváros	2019–20	Nemzeti Bajnokság I	12	0	0	0	—		0	0	12	0
Ferencváros	2020–21	Nemzeti Bajnokság I	14	1	3	0	—		0	0	17	1
Ferencváros	2021–22	Nemzeti Bajnokság I	25	2	3	0	—		10 (Note: Four appearances in UEFA Champions League, six appearances in UEFA Europa League)	0	38	2
Ferencváros	2022–23	Nemzeti Bajnokság I	19	1	2	1	—		14 (Note: Four appearances in UEFA Champions League, ten appearances and one goal in UEFA Europa League)	1	35	3
Ferencváros	Total		70	4	8	1	0	0	24	1	102	6
Vissel Kobe	2023	J1 League	2	0	—		—		—		2	0
Paks	2023–24	Nemzeti Bajnokság I	5	0	2	0	—		—		7	0
Paks	2024–25	Nemzeti Bajnokság I	28	1	2	0	—		8 (Note: Two appearances in UEFA Europa League, six appearances in UEFA Conference League)	0	38	1
Paks	2025–26	Nemzeti Bajnokság I	4	1	0	0	—		6 (Note: Two appearances in UEFA Europa League, four appearances in UEFA Conference League)	0	10	1
Paks	Total		37	2	4	0	—		14	0	55	2
Career total			303	19	25	4	4	0	48	2	380	26

=== International ===
As of match played 27 March 2023

Appearances and goals by national team and year
National team	Year	Apps	Goals
Hungary	2014	2	0
Hungary	2021	4	1
Hungary	2022	4	0
Hungary	2023	2	1
Hungary	2025	1	0
Total		13	2

As of match played on 23 March 2025
Scores and results list Hungary's goal tally first, score column indicates score after each Vécsei goal.

List of international goals scored by Bálint Vécsei
No.	Date	Venue	Opponent	Score	Result	Competition
1	12 November 2021	Puskás Aréna, Budapest, Hungary	San Marino	4–0	4–0	2022 FIFA World Cup qualification
2	27 March 2023	Puskás Aréna, Budapest, Hungary	Bulgaria	1–0	3–0	UEFA Euro 2024 qualifying

== Honours ==
Ferencvárosi TC

- Nemzeti Bajnokság I: 2019–20, 2020–21, 2021–22, 2022–23
- Magyar Kupa: 2021–22

Vissel Kobe

- J1 League: 2023
