= Marquinhos (footballer, born 1999) =

Brazilian footballer

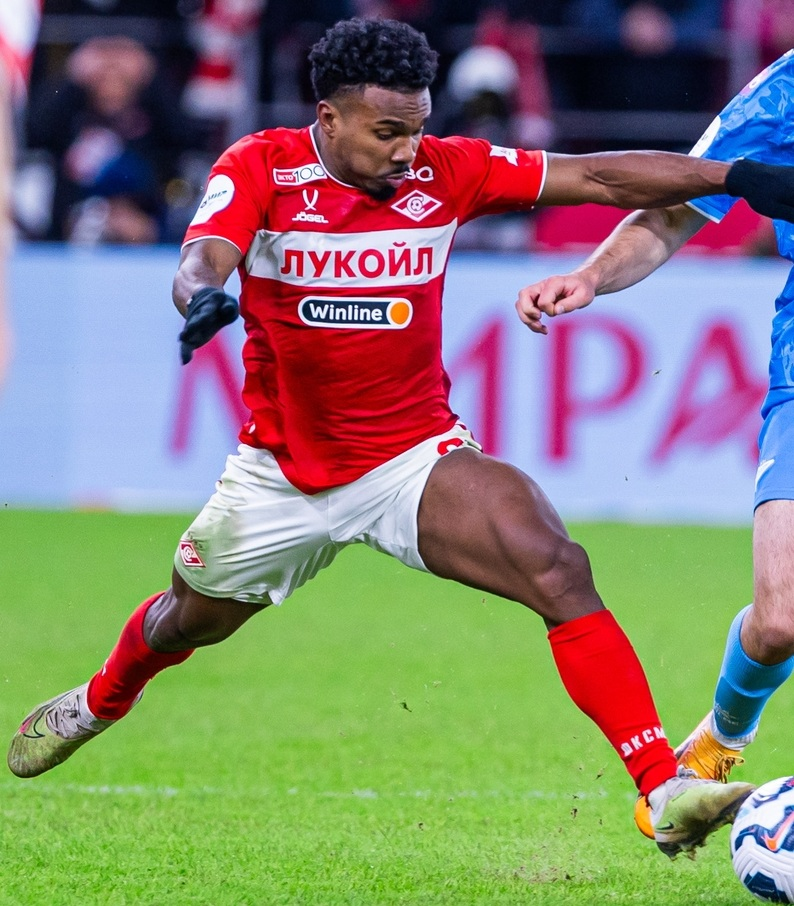
- Marquinhos with Spartak in 2025

Personal information
- Full name: José Marcos Costa Martins
- Date of birth: 23 October 1999 (age 27)
- Place of birth: Cajari, Brazil
- Height: 1.65 m (5 ft 5 in)
- Position: Winger

Team information
- Current team: Spartak Moscow
- Number: 10

Youth career
- 2016–2019: Atlético Mineiro

Senior career*
Years	Team	Apps	(Gls)
2017–2022	Atlético Mineiro	39	(2)
2018	→ Chapecoense (loan)	2	(0)
2021–2022	→ Botev Plovdiv (loan)	28	(6)
2022–2024	Ferencváros	64	(13)
2024–	Spartak Moscow	67	(6)
- * Club domestic league appearances and goals as of 22 November 2026

José Marcos Costa Martins (born 23 October 1999), commonly known as Marquinhos, is a Brazilian professional footballer who plays as a winger for Russian club Spartak Moscow.

== Club career ==
=== Ferencváros ===
On 5 May 2023, he won the 2022–23 Nemzeti Bajnokság I with Ferencváros, after Kecskemét lost 1–0 to Honvéd at the Bozsik Aréna on the 30th matchday.

On 20 April 2024, the Ferencváros–Kisvárda tie ended with a goalless draw at the Groupama Aréna on the 29th match day of the 2023–24 Nemzeti Bajnokság I season which meant that Ferencváros won their 35th championship.

On 15 May 2024, Ferencváros were defeated by Paks 2–0 in the 2024 Magyar Kupa Final at the Puskás Aréna.

=== Spartak Moscow ===
On 3 August 2024, Marquinhos signed a three-year contract with Russian Premier League club Spartak Moscow, reuniting with his manager at Ferencváros, Dejan Stanković. On 30 July 2025, the contract was extended to 2029.

== International career ==
On 2 May 2024, he expressed his intent, published in Nemzeti Sport, to play for the Hungary national football team.

== Career statistics ==
=== Club ===
As of 22 November 2026

Appearances and goals by club, season and competition
Club	Season	League			State League		Cup		Continental		Other		Total	
Club	Season	Division	Apps	Goals	Apps	Goals	Apps	Goals	Apps	Goals	Apps	Goals	Apps	Goals
Atlético Mineiro	2017	Série A	1	0	0	0	0	0	—		—		1	0
Atlético Mineiro	2018	Série A	0	0	0	0	0	0	1 (Note: Appearances in the Copa Sudamericana)	0	1	0		
Atlético Mineiro	2019	Série A	12	1	1	0	0	0	0	0	—		13	1
Atlético Mineiro	2020	Série A	11	0	14	1	1	0	2	0	—		28	1
Atlético Mineiro	Total		24	1	15	1	1	0	3	0	—		43	2
Chapecoense (loan)	2018	Série A	2	0	—		0	0	—		—		2	0
Botev Plovdiv (loan)	2020–21	First League	10	0	—		1	1	—		—		11	1
Botev Plovdiv (loan)	2021–22	First League	18	6	—		1	0	—		—		19	6
Botev Plovdiv (loan)	Total		28	6	—		2	1	—		—		30	7
Ferencváros	2021–22	Nemzeti Bajnokság I	8	1	—		1	0	—		—		9	1
Ferencváros	2022–23	Nemzeti Bajnokság I	29	6	—		0	0	8 (Note: Two appearances in UEFA Champions League, six appearances in UEFA Europa League)	0	—		37	6
Ferencváros	2023–24	Nemzeti Bajnokság I	27	7	—		4	0	15 (Note: Two appearances in UEFA Champions League, thirteen appearances in UEFA Europa Conference League)	0	—		46	7
Ferencváros	Total		64	14	—		5	0	23	0	—		92	14
Spartak Moscow	2024–25	Russian Premier League	26	0	—		10	2	—		—		36	2
Spartak Moscow	2025–26	Russian Premier League	26	5	—		9	3	—		—		35	8
Spartak Moscow	2026–27	Russian Premier League	15	1	—		4	1	—		1 (Note: Appearance in Russian Super Cup)	0	20	2
Spartak Moscow	Total		67	6	—		23	6	—		1	0	91	12
Career total			185	27	15	1	31	7	26	0	1	0	258	35

== Honours ==
Atlético Mineiro

- Campeonato Mineiro: 2020

Ferencvárosi

- Nemzeti Bajnokság I: 2021–22, 2022–23, 2023–24
- Magyar Kupa: 2021–22

Spartak Moscow

- Russian Cup: 2025–26
