= Lóránd Pászka =

Hungarian footballer (born 1996)

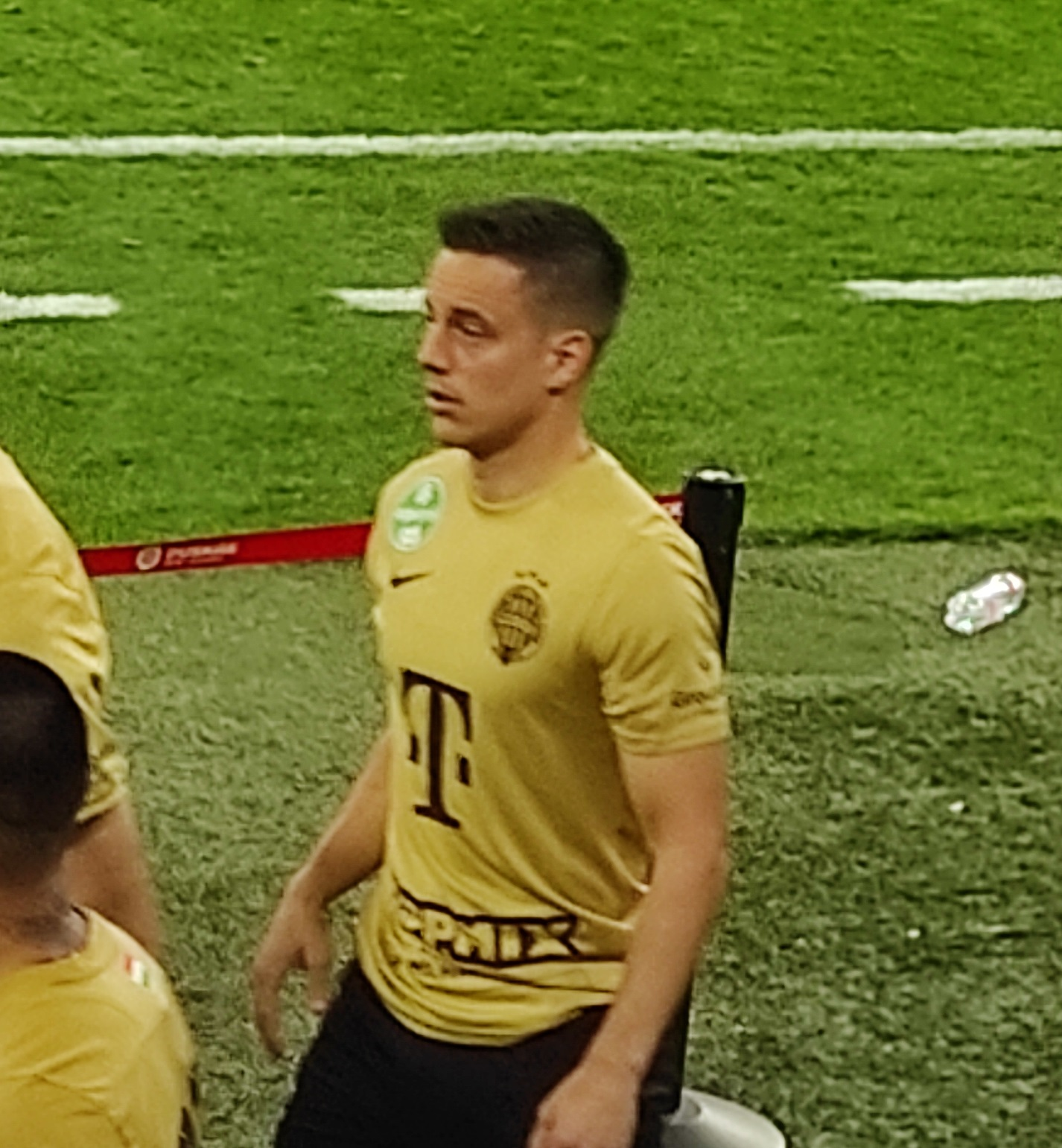
- Pászka with Ferencváros in 2024

Personal information
- Date of birth: 22 March 1996 (age 30)
- Place of birth: Târgu Secuiesc, Romania
- Height: 1.76 m (5 ft 9 in)
- Positions: Left-back; left winger

Team information
- Current team: FK Csíkszereda
- Number: 6

Youth career
- –2010: CS Nagy Mózes Târgu Secuiesc
- 2011–2013: Szeged

Senior career*
Years	Team	Apps	(Gls)
2013–2019	Szeged	117	(3)
2015	→ Gyula (loan)	15	(5)
2015–2016	Szeged II	13	(7)
2019–2022	Soroksár	74	(5)
2022–2025	Ferencváros	36	(2)
2022–2025	Ferencváros II	3	(2)
2025	→ Kecskemét (loan)	6	(1)
2025–	FK Csíkszereda	44	(2)
- * Club domestic league appearances and goals as of 7 November 2026

Lóránd Pászka (born 22 March 1996) is a Hungarian professional footballer who plays as a left-back or a left winger for Liga I club FK Csíkszereda.

== Career ==
A youth product of Szeged, Pászka began his career with the club in 2013. In February 2015, he was loaned out to Nemzeti Bajnokság III club Gyula for the second half of the season. In 2019, Pászka transferred to Nemzeti Bajnokság II side Soroksár, where he scored 5 goals in 73 league appearances.

On 14 February 2022, he transferred to Ferencváros. In his debut season with Ferencváros he won the Nemzeti Bajnokság I and Magyar Kupa.

On 5 May 2023, he won the 2022–23 Nemzeti Bajnokság I with Ferencváros, after Kecskemét lost 1–0 to Honvéd at the Bozsik Aréna on the 30th matchday.

On 20 April 2024, the Ferencváros–Kisvárda tie ended with a goalless draw at the Groupama Aréna on the 29th match day of the 2023–24 Nemzeti Bajnokság I season which meant that Ferencváros won their 35th championship.

On 15 May 2024, Ferencváros were defeated by Paks 2–0 in the 2024 Magyar Kupa Final at the Puskás Aréna.

== Personal life ==
Born in Romania, Pászka is of Hungarian descent.

== Club statistics ==
As of match played 7 November 2026

Appearances and goals by club, season and competition
Club	Season	League			National cup (Note: Includes Magyar Kupa, Cupa României)		League cup (Note: Includes Ligakupa)		Europe		Total	
Club	Season	Division	Apps	Goals	Apps	Goals	Apps	Goals	Apps	Goals	Apps	Goals
Szeged	2013–14	Nemzeti Bajnokság III	24	1	4	0	—		—		28	1
Szeged	2014–15	Nemzeti Bajnokság II	7	0	2	1	4	0	—		13	1
Szeged	2015–16	Nemzeti Bajnokság II	17	1	3	0	—		—		20	1
Szeged	2016–17	Nemzeti Bajnokság II	20	1	0	0	—		—		20	1
Szeged	2017–18	Nemzeti Bajnokság II	21	0	0	0	—		—		21	0
Szeged	2018–19	Nemzeti Bajnokság III	28	0	1	0	—		—		29	0
Szeged	Total		117	3	10	1	4	0	—		131	4
Gyula (loan)	2014–15	Nemzeti Bajnokság III	15	5	—		—		—		15	5
Szeged II	2015–16	Megyei Bajnokság I	13	7	—		—		—		13	7
Soroksár	2019–20	Nemzeti Bajnokság II	20	3	1	0	—		—		21	3
Soroksár	2020–21	Nemzeti Bajnokság II	32	2	2	1	—		—		34	3
Soroksár	2021–22	Nemzeti Bajnokság II	22	0	0	0	—		—		22	0
Soroksár	Total		74	5	3	1	—		—		77	6
Ferencváros	2021–22	Nemzeti Bajnokság I	5	0	2	0	—		—		7	0
Ferencváros	2022–23	Nemzeti Bajnokság I	19	2	1	0	—		6 (Note: One appearance in UEFA Champions League, five appearances in UEFA Europa League)	0	26	2
Ferencváros	2023–24	Nemzeti Bajnokság I	9	0	2	0	—		4 (Note: Appearances in UEFA Conference League)	0	15	0
Ferencváros	2024–25	Nemzeti Bajnokság I	3	0	1	0	—		0	0	4	0
Ferencváros	Total		36	2	6	0	—		10	0	52	2
Ferencváros II	2021–22	Nemzeti Bajnokság III	1	0	—		—		—		1	0
Ferencváros II	2024–25	Nemzeti Bajnokság III	2	2	—		—		—		2	2
Ferencváros II	Total		3	2	—		—		—		3	2
Kecskemét (loan)	2024–25	Nemzeti Bajnokság I	6	1	—		—		—		6	1
FK Csíkszereda	2025–26	Liga I	29	2	4	0	—		—		33	2
FK Csíkszereda	2026–27	Liga I	15	0	3	0	—		—		18	0
FK Csíkszereda	Total		44	2	7	0	—		—		51	2
Career total			308	27	26	2	4	0	10	0	348	29

== Honours ==
Szeged

- Nemzeti Bajnokság III: 2018–19

Ferencváros

- Nemzeti Bajnokság I: 2021–22, 2022–23, 2023–24, 2024–25
- Magyar Kupa: 2021–22
