= Carlos Auzqui =

Argentine footballer

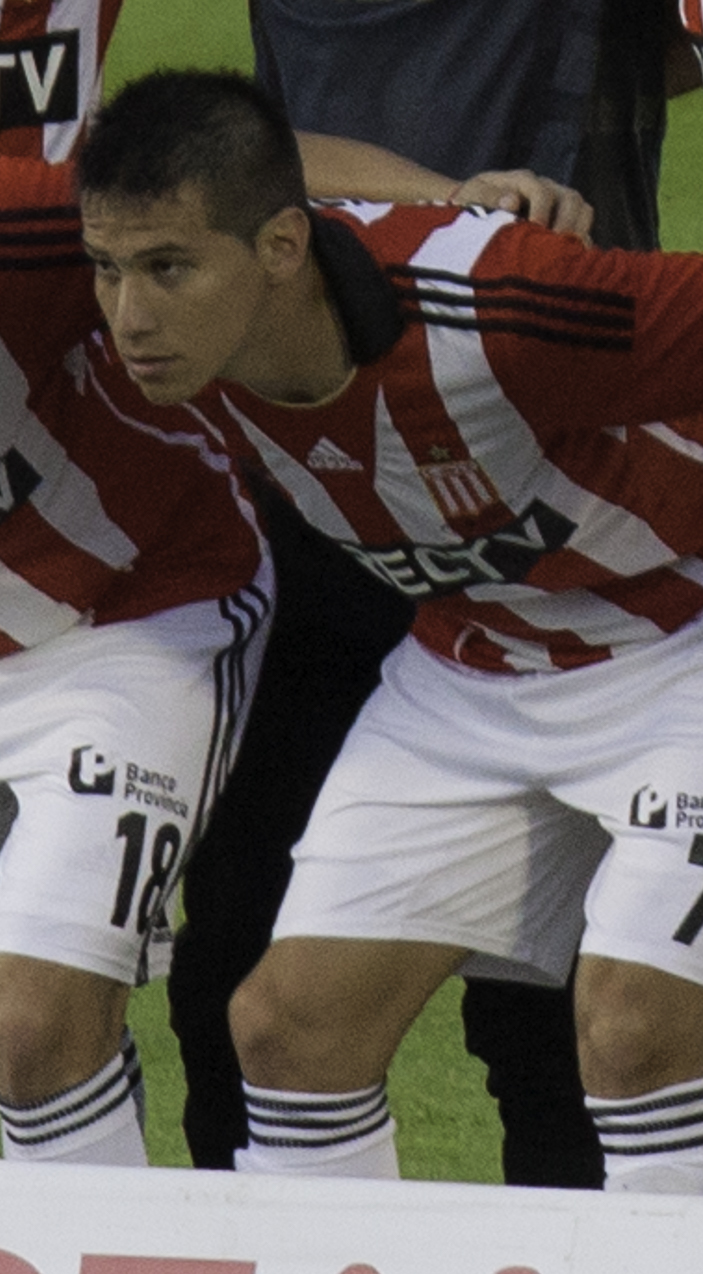
- Auzqui with Estudiantes in 2014

Personal information
- Full name: Carlos Daniel Auzqui
- Date of birth: 16 March 1991 (age 35)
- Place of birth: Bernal, Argentina
- Height: 1.80 m (5 ft 11 in)
- Position: Winger

Team information
- Current team: Agropecuario
- Number: 9

Senior career*
| Years | Team | Apps | (Gls) |
| 2010–2017 | Estudiantes | 135 | (13) |
| 2017–2022 | River Plate | 24 | (3) |
| 2018–2019 | → Huracán (loan) | 20 | (3) |
| 2019–2020 | → Lanús (loan) | 22 | (4) |
| 2020–2022 | → Talleres de Córdoba (loan) | 46 | (10) |
| 2022–2023 | Ferencváros | 25 | (4) |
| 2023–2024 | San Lorenzo | 5 | (0) |
| 2024–2025 | O'Higgins | 19 | (0) |
| 2025–2026 | Atlético Tucumán | 19 | (1) |
| 2026– | Agropecuario | 5 | (0) |
- * Club domestic league appearances and goals as of 23 March 2026

Carlos Daniel Auzqui (born 16 March 1991) is an Argentine professional footballer who plays as a winger for Agropecuario.

== Career ==
On 12 February 2022, Auzqui signed for Nemzeti Bajnokság I club Ferencvárosi TC. On 5 May 2023, he won the 2022–23 Nemzeti Bajnokság I with Ferencváros, after Kecskemét lost 1–0 to Honvéd at the Bozsik Aréna on the 30th matchday.

In 2024, he moved to Chile and signed with O'Higgins in the top division.

== Honours ==
River Plate

- Copa Libertadores: 2018
