= Gergő Szécsi =

Hungarian footballer

Personal information
- Date of birth: 7 February 1989 (age 37)
- Place of birth: Eger, Hungary
- Height: 1.85 m (6 ft 1 in)
- Position: Goalkeeper

Team information
- Current team: Ferencváros
- Number: 29

Youth career
- 2004–2007: Debrecen

Senior career*
Years	Team	Apps	(Gls)
2007–2015	Debrecen	0	(0)
2007–2011	→ Létavértes (loan)	74	(1)
2011–2015	→ Debrecen II	20	(0)
2011	→ Békéscsaba (loan)	14	(0)
2011–2012	→ Balmazújváros (loan)	13	(0)
2013–2014	→ Létavértes (loan)	9	(0)
2014–2015	→ Kisvárda (loan)	1	(0)
2015–2019	Balmazújváros	54	(0)
2019–	Ferencváros	0	(0)
2020–	Ferencváros II	18	(0)
2021	→ Soroksár (loan)	5	(0)
- * Club domestic league appearances and goals as of 12 March 2023

Gergő Szécsi (born 7 February 1989) is a Hungarian professional footballer who plays as a goalkeeper for Ferencváros.

== Club career ==
On 18 November 2017, he was signed by Nemzeti Bajnokság I club Balmazújvárosi FC.

In June 2019, Gergő signed to Ferencvaros as their 3rd goalkeeper.

On 5 May 2023, he won the 2022–23 Nemzeti Bajnokság I with Ferencváros, after Kecskemét lost 1–0 to Honvéd at the Bozsik Aréna on the 30th matchday.

On 20 April 2024, the Ferencváros–Kisvárda tie ended with a goalless draw at the Groupama Aréna on the 29th match day of the 2023–24 Nemzeti Bajnokság I season which meant that Ferencváros won their 35th championship.

On 15 May 2024, Ferencváros were defeated by Paks 2–0 in the 2024 Magyar Kupa Final at the Puskás Aréna.

== Career statistics ==
Appearances and goals by club, season and competition
Club	Season	League		Cup		League Cup		Europe		Total	
Club	Season	Apps	Goals	Apps	Goals	Apps	Goals	Apps	Goals	Apps	Goals
Létavértes
Létavértes	2007–08	27	1	3	2	0	0	–	–	30	2
Létavértes	2008–09	30	0	2	0	0	0	–	–	32	0
Létavértes	2009–10	17	0	2	0	0	0	–	–	19	0
Létavértes	2013–14	9	0	0	0	0	0	–	–	9	0
Létavértes	Total	83	1	7	2	0	0	0	0	90	2
Békéscsaba
Békéscsaba	2010–11	14	0	2	0	–	–	–	–	16	0
Békéscsaba	Total	14	0	2	0	–	–	–	–	16	0
Debrecen
Debrecen	2012–13	0	0	0	0	2	0	–	–	2	0
Debrecen	Total	0	0	0	0	2	0	–	–	2	0
Debrecen II
Debrecen II	2012–13	19	0	0	0	-	-	–	–	19	0
Debrecen II	Total	19	0	0	0	-	-	–	–	19	0
Kisvárda
Kisvárda	2013–14	1	0	0	0	–	–	–	–	1	0
Kisvárda	Total	1	0	0	0	–	–	–	–	1	0
Balmazújváros
Balmazújváros	2011–12	13	0	2	0	–	–	–	–	15	0
Balmazújváros	2015–16	9	0	0	0	–	–	–	–	9	0
Balmazújváros	2016–17	14	0	3	0	–	–	–	–	17	0
Balmazújváros	2017–18	4	0	5	0	–	–	–	–	9	0
Balmazújváros	2018–19	27	0	0	0	–	–	–	–	27	0
Balmazújváros	Total	67	0	10	0	–	–	–	–	77	0
Ferencváros
Ferencváros	2019–20	0	0	0	0	–	–	0	0	0	0
Ferencváros	2020–21	0	0	1	0	–	–	0	0	1	0
Ferencváros	2021–22	0	0	0	0	–	–	0	0	1	0
Ferencváros	Total	0	0	1	0	–	–	–	–	2	0
Career total		184	1	20	2	2	0	0	0	206	3

Updated to games played as of 15 May 2022.
