= Dominik Csontos =

Hungarian football defender

Personal information
- Full name: Dominik Zoltán Csontos
- Date of birth: 8 November 2002 (age 24)
- Place of birth: Székesfehérvár, Hungary
- Height: 1.71 m (5 ft 7 in)
- Position: Left back

Team information
- Current team: Budapest Honvéd
- Number: 5

Youth career
- 2008–2015: Fehérvár
- 2015–2020: Ferencváros

Senior career*
Years	Team	Apps	(Gls)
2019–2023	Ferencváros	6	(1)
2021–2023	→ Soroksár (loan)	45	(3)
2023	Mezőkövesd	0	(0)
2023–2024	Győr	49	(3)
2024–2025	Zalaegerszeg	0	(0)
2025–	Budapest Honvéd	38	(13)

International career^{‡}
2021	Hungary U-21	5	(0)
- * Club domestic league appearances and goals as of 31 May 2026 ‡ National team caps and goals as of 16 November 2021

Dominik Csontos (born 8 November 2002) is a Hungarian football defender who plays for Budapest Honvéd.

== Club career ==
=== Ferencváros ===
On 16 June 2020, he became champion with Ferencváros by beating Budapest Honvéd FC at the Hidegkuti Nándor Stadion on the 30th match day of the 2019–20 Nemzeti Bajnokság I season.

=== Győr through Mezőkövesd ===
On 24 January 2023, Csontos joined Mezőkövesd. On the same day, his rights were transferred to Győr and Csontos signed a two-and-a-half-year contract with the club.

== Career statistics ==
As of 15 May 2022

Appearances and goals by club, season and competition
Club	Season	League			Cup		Continental		Other		Total	
Club	Season	Division	Apps	Goals	Apps	Goals	Apps	Goals	Apps	Goals	Apps	Goals
Ferencváros	2019–20	Nemzeti Bajnokság I	2	0	1	0	0	0	–		3	0
Ferencváros	2020–21	Nemzeti Bajnokság I	1	1	3	0	0	0	–		4	1
Ferencváros	2021–22	Nemzeti Bajnokság I	3	0	2	0	1 (Note: Appearance in UEFA Champions League)	0	–		4	0
Ferencváros	Total		6	1	6	0	1	0	–		13	1
Soroksár (loan)	2020–21	Nemzeti Bajnokság II	13	1	0	0	–		–		13	1
Soroksár (loan)	2021–22	Nemzeti Bajnokság I	17	2	0	0	–		–		17	2
Soroksár (loan)	Total		30	3	0	0	–		–		30	3
Career total			36	4	6	0	1	0	–		43	4
