= Fortune Bassey =

Nigerian footballer

Personal information
- Full name: Fortune Akpan Bassey
- Date of birth: 6 October 1998 (age 28)
- Place of birth: Benin City, Nigeria
- Height: 1.86 m (6 ft 1 in)
- Position: Striker

Team information
- Current team: Ferencváros
- Number: 40

Youth career
- Eagle's Wing
- 2018: Bohemians 1905

Senior career*
Years	Team	Apps	(Gls)
2018–2019	Olympia Radotín	33	(24)
2019–2020	Ústí nad Labem	28	(5)
2020–2022	České Budějovice	25	(9)
2021	→ Vlašim (loan)	14	(4)
2022–	Ferencváros	15	(2)
2022	→ Viktoria Plzeň (loan)	12	(1)
2023	→ Degerfors (loan)	11	(0)
2023–2024	→ Hapoel Petah Tikva (loan)	31	(5)
2024–2025	→ DAC 1904 (loan)	9	(3)
- * Club domestic league appearances and goals as of 16 June 2025

Fortune Akpan Bassey (born 6 October 1998) is a Nigerian professional footballer who plays as a striker for Hungarian club Ferencváros.

== Club career ==
Bassey is a youth product of the Nigerian academy Eagle's Wing and the Czech club Bohemians 1905. He began his senior career in the Czech Republic in the third division with Olympia Radotín, scoring 24 goals in 33 games. He then had a stint with Czech National Football League side Ústí nad Labem in 2019-20, before moving to the first division with České Budějovice.

On 17 January 2022, Bassey moved to the Hungarian side Ferencváros in a record sale from České Budějovice. He finished his debut season in Hungary with 5 goals in 23 matches in all competitions. In his debut season with Ferencváros he won the Nemzeti Bajnokság I and Magyar Kupa. He returned to the Czech Republic on a loan with Viktoria Plzeň on 12 April 2022. After half year Bassey returned to Ferencváros.

On 4 March 2023, Bassey moved on a new loan to Degerfors in Sweden until the end of 2023.

On 7 September 2024, Bassey was loaned by DAC 1904 in Slovakia.

== Honours ==
Ferencváros

- Nemzeti Bajnokság I: 2021–22
- Magyar Kupa: 2021–22
