= Roko Baturina =

Croatian footballer

Personal information
- Date of birth: 20 June 2000 (age 26)
- Place of birth: Split, Croatia
- Height: 1.87 m (6 ft 2 in)
- Position: Forward

Team information
- Current team: Aarau
- Number: 9

Youth career
- 2008–2015: Hajduk Split
- 2015–2017: RNK Split
- 2017–2018: Dinamo Zagreb

Senior career*
Years	Team	Apps	(Gls)
2017	RNK Split	1	(0)
2017–2020	Dinamo Zagreb	1	(0)
2018–2020	Dinamo Zagreb II	21	(7)
2020	→ Bravo (loan)	16	(8)
2020–2023	Ferencváros	20	(4)
2021	→ Lech Poznań (loan)	0	(0)
2021	→ Lech Poznań II (loan)	6	(1)
2022–2023	→ Maribor (loan)	19	(5)
2023	→ Racing Santander (loan)	14	(4)
2023–2026	Gil Vicente	15	(2)
2024	→ Racing Santander (loan)	12	(1)
2024–2025	→ Málaga (loan)	24	(2)
2025–2026	→ Horsens (loan)	16	(4)
2026–	Aarau	4	(1)

International career
2014	Croatia U14	4	(0)
2015	Croatia U15	5	(3)
2015–2016	Croatia U16	8	(1)
2016–2017	Croatia U17	10	(1)
2018	Croatia U18	2	(1)
2017–2019	Croatia U19	12	(2)
2019–2021	Croatia U20	4	(0)
- * Club domestic league appearances and goals as of 18 September 2026

Roko Baturina (born 20 June 2000) is a Croatian professional footballer who plays as a forward for Swiss Challenge League club Aarau.

== Career ==
In August 2017, Baturina joined Dinamo Zagreb together with his younger brothers Martin and Marin.

On 17 July 2020, Baturina was signed by Nemzeti Bajnokság I club Ferencváros. After playing 20 league games and winning the Hungarian championship in the 2020–21 season, he spent the following two seasons on loan at Ekstraklasa side Lech Poznań, Slovenian PrvaLiga side NK Maribor, and Segunda División side Racing de Santander, respectively.

On 20 July 2023, Baturina moved to Portugal, signing a four-year contract with Primeira Liga club Gil Vicente. On 15 January 2024, after having scored 3 goals and provided an assist in 19 appearances in all competitions for the Barcelos-based side, he returned to Racing on loan until the end of the season.

On 22 July 2024, Baturina was loaned to fellow Spanish second division side Málaga, for one year.

On transfer deadline day, September 1, 2025, Baturina transferred to the Danish 1st Division club AC Horsens on a loan deal until the end of the season.

== Honours ==
Dinamo Zagreb

- Croatian Football Super Cup: 2019

Ferencváros

- Nemzeti Bajnokság I: 2020–21, 2021–22
- Magyar Kupa: 2021–22
