= Bozsik Aréna =

Multi-purpose stadium in Budapest, Hungary

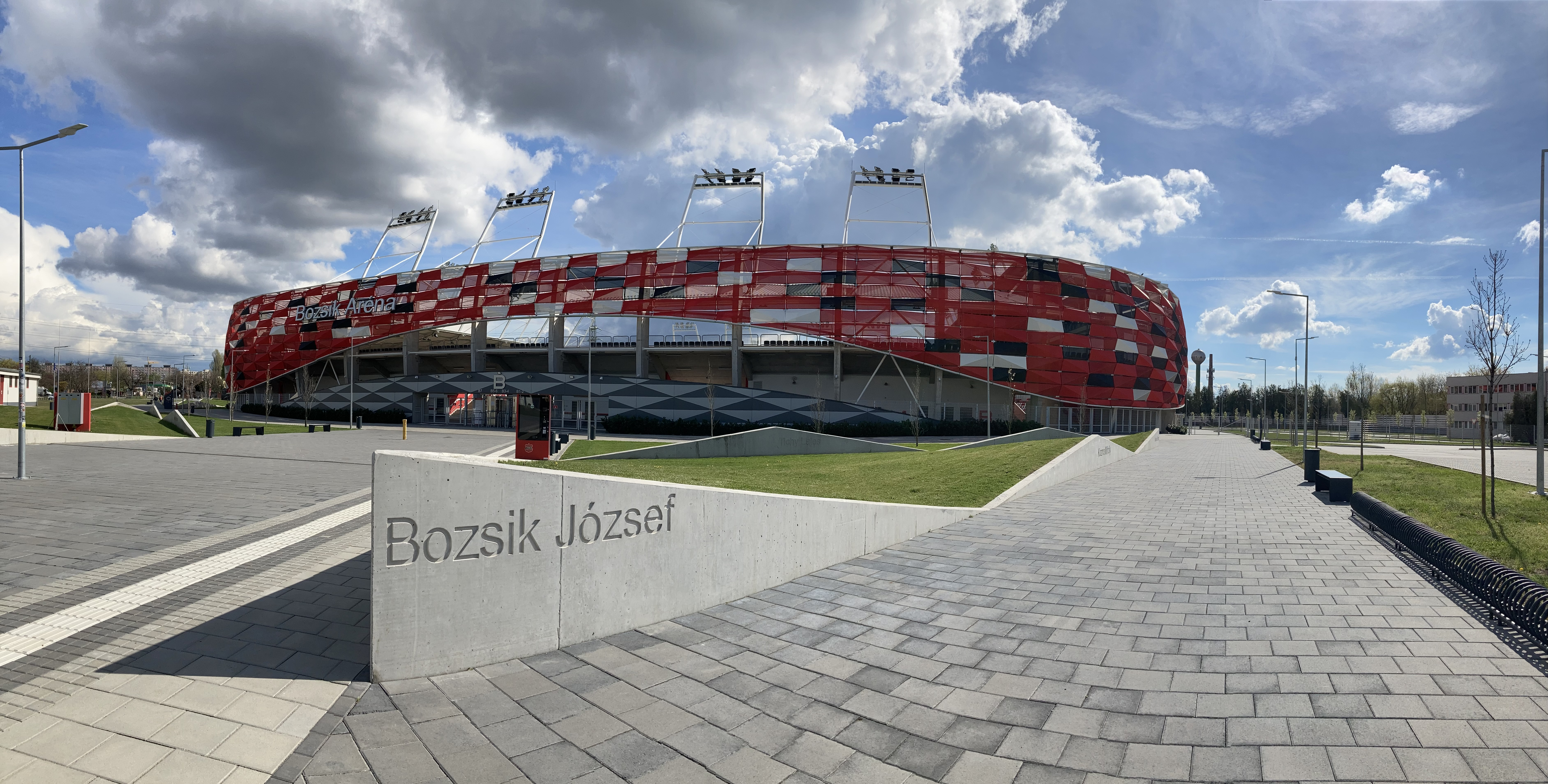
- UEFA
- Interactive map of Bozsik Aréna
- Location: Kispest, Budapest, Hungary
- Coordinates: 47°26′33″N 19°9′18″E
- Owner: Government of Hungary
- Operator: Budapest Honvéd F.C.
- Capacity: 8,370
- Surface: Grass
- Field size: 105 m × 68 m (344 ft × 223 ft)

Construction
- Groundbreaking: 2019
- Built: 2019–2021
- Opened: 14 March 2021
- Cost: €47 million

Tenant
- Budapest Honvéd

Bozsik Aréna is a multi-purpose stadium in Budapest, Hungary. It is primarily used for football matches and it is the home stadium of Nemzeti Bajnokság II club Budapest Honvéd F.C. Opening on 24 July 2021, it is named after Hungary footballer József Bozsik.

== History ==
=== Planning and construction ===
On 20 November 2014, it was revealed that the reconstruction of the Bozsik József Stadion would start in 2015 and finish in 2016. The capacity of the new stadium was announced to be 9,000, with 900 VIP seats, 350 skyboxes, and a 100 square metre mixed zone for the press. Óbuda Group was commissioned as the project's architects, with planning taking place between 2014 and 2015. However, construction was delayed until March 2019, with new plans revealing a revised capacity of 8,200 and a three-floor main stand, which comes together with the other stands to form a U-shape. The facilities include a modern floodlight system while a lion statue designed by Gábor Szőke was placed in front of the stadium.

According to Szilvia Zsilák of Átlátszó, the initial costs of the stadium was estimated at €12.6 million, which increased during construction to €29.5 million. On 22 April 2020, it was announced that the construction of the stadium would increase to €32.2 million. On 6 July, it was revealed that the final cost of construction was €47 million. The stadium is owned by the Government of Hungary.

A ceremony to mark the beginning of construction was held on 21 March 2019, with minister of sport Tünde Szabó, Kispest mayor Péter Gajda, and Budapest Honvéd owner George Hemingway present. Szabó noted the stadium to be part of a renovation project for the Kispest area of Budapest, while Hemingway revealed delays to the project arose due to the club's desire to rebuild on the same site as the previous stadium. He also stated the stadium would open on 12 June 2020, with the stadium capable of hosting any UEFA matches, except the Champions League final.

Construction was undertaken by Pharos 95 Sportpályaépítő Kft and West Hungária Bau Kft, who constructed the club's training ground. The planning opening was delayed due to the COVID-19 pandemic: the 24 March 2021 match between the Hungary national under-21 football team and the Germany national under-21 football team was selected to be the first match played in the stadium, but this was changed to the reserve team of Budapest Honvéd and Szekszárdi UFC, to take place a week earlier.

=== Opening ===
Honvéd played their first match at the stadium on 24 July, a draw against Villarreal CF B in a friendly. The match ball was delivered by a parachute jumper and the first kick was taken by the grandson of Ferenc Puskás. The match was played without spectators due to COVID-19. The stadium was selected to host the 2021 UEFA European Under-21 Championship. On 31 July 2021 Nemzeti Bajnokság I played their first match at the stadium, while Honvéd played their first competitive match in the stadium in a losing effort against Debreceni VSC.

=== Present ===
On 10 October 2024, Israel hosted France in the 2024–25 UEFA Nations League A group match due to the Gaza war. The match ended with a 4–1 victory for France.

== Matches ==
24 July 2021	Budapest Honvéd (Hungary)	0–0	(Spain) Villarreal	Opening match
		(Report)		Attendance: 8,400; Referee: Péter Solymosi (Hungary)

31 July 2021	Budapest Honvéd	1–4	Debrecen	2021–22 Nemzeti Bajnokság I First Nemzeti Bajnokság I match
	Bőle 36'	(Report)	60' (p.) Dzsudzsák; 65' Bárány; 81' Bévárdi; 96' Ugrai	Attendance: 3,257; Referee: Tamás Bognár (Hungary)

1 March 2022	Budapest Honvéd	0–1	Ferencváros	2021–22 Magyar Kupa; First Magyar Kupa match
		(Report)	23' Tokmac Nguen	Referee: Balázs Berke (Hungary)

== International matches ==
9 September 2024
20:45

Israel	1–2	Italy
Abu Fani 90'	Report	Frattesi 38'; Kean 62'

Attendance: 2,090
Referee: Ivan Kružliak (Slovakia)
10 October 2024
20:45

Israel	1–4	France
Gandelman 24'	Report	Camavinga 7'; Nkunku 28'; Guendouzi 87'; Barcola 89'

Attendance: 2,226
Referee: Nikola Dabanović (Montenegro)

== Attendances ==
As of 7 May 2020.

Season	Average
2020–21	TBA

== See also ==
- List of football stadiums in Hungary
