= 2026 Magyar Kupa final =

- The Puskás Aréna during the final.
- Event: 2025–26 Magyar Kupa
Ferencváros	Zalaegerszeg
1	0
- After extra time
- Date: 9 May 2026
- Venue: Puskás Aréna, Budapest
- Man of the Match: Toon Raemaekers (Ferencváros)
- Referee: Márton Rúsz
- Attendance: 49,858
- Weather: 24°C, clear

The 2026 Magyar Kupa final decided the winners of the 2025–26 Magyar Kupa, the 86th season of Hungarian premier football cup, the Magyar Kupa. The match will be played on 9 May 2026 at the Puskás Aréna in Budapest between Ferencváros and Zalaegerszeg.

The winner qualified for the first qualifying round of 2026–27 Europa League.

== Teams ==
Team	Previous finals appearances (bold indicates winners)
Ferencváros	35 (1912, **1913**, **1922**, **1927**, **1928**, 1931, 1932, **1933**, **1935**, **1942**, **1943**, **1944**, **1958**, 1966, **1972**, **1974**, **1976**, 1977, **1978**, 1979, 1986, 1989, **1991**, **1993**, **1994**, **1995**, **2003**, **2004**, 2005, **2015**, **2016**, **2017**, **2022**, 2024, 2025)
Zalaegerszeg	2 (2010, **2023**)

== Venue ==
The final has been originally played at the rebuilt Puskás Aréna since it opened, in 2020. This final was the seventh Magyar Kupa final in this stadium.

== Background ==
Ferencváros can win the Hungarian Cup for the twenty-fifth time, while Zalaegerszeg can win it for the second time. The two teams will meet for the first time in the Hungarian Cup final. The most common pairing so far has been the Ferencváros-Újpest match in the final, which has happened four times, in 1923, 1927, 1933 and 2016. Ferencváros is the most successful club, having won the Hungarian Cup 24 times and being a finalist 11 more times. It has won the Magyar Kupa three times in the previous ten years, in 2016, 2017 and 2022. Zalaegerszeg is a finalist for the third time after 2010 and 2023. In 2023, the Zalaegerszeg became the 19th winner in the history of the Hungarian Cup.

== Route to the final ==
Note: In all results below, the score of the finalist is given first (H: home; A: away).

Ferencváros			Round	Zalaegerszeg		
Opponent	Result			Opponent	Result	
Bye			First round	Bye		
Bye			Second round	Bye		
Szarvaskend (MB I – Tier 4)	15–0	(A)	Round of 64	Vásárosnamény (MB I – Tier 4)	13–0	(A)
Békéscsaba (NB II)	4–0	(H)	Round of 32	Budafok (NB II)	3–1	(H)
Csákvár (NB II)	4–0	(H)	Round of 16	Vasas (NB II)	2–1	(H)
Kazincbarcika (NB I)	5–0	(A)	Quarter-finals	Soroksár (NB II)	1–0	(H)
Győri ETO (NB I)	2–2 (a.e.t.) (3–2 p)	(H)	Semi-finals	Budapest Honvéd (NB II)	2–2 (a.e.t.) (5–4 p)	(H)

== Match ==
=== Details ===
9 May 2026
18:00 CEST (UTC+2)

Ferencváros	1–0 (a.e.t.)	Zalaegerszeg
Raemaekers 111'	Report

Puskás Aréna, Budapest
Attendance: 49,858
Referee: Márton Rúsz

**Ferencváros**	**Zalaegerszeg**

GK	90	(Hungary) Dénes Dibusz (c)
CB	25	(Latvia) Čebrails Makreckis
CB	4	(Argentina) Mariano Gómez
CB	28	(Belgium) Toon Raemaekers
RM	20	(Brazil) Cadu		(substituted off) 79'
CM	88	(Belgium) Philippe Rommens		(substituted off) 91'
CM	16	(Norway) Kristoffer Zachariassen		(substituted off) 79'
CM	36	(Israel) Gabi Kanichowsky
LM	47	(Republic of Ireland) Callum O'Dowda		(substituted off) 98'
RF	75	(France) Lenny Joseph		(substituted off) 106'
LF	30	(Hungary) Zsombor Gruber		(substituted off) 64'
Substitutes:
GK	99	(Hungary) Dávid Gróf
DF	5	(Guinea) Naby Keïta
FW	10	(Sweden) Jonathan Levi
FW	11	(Nigeria) Bamidele Yusuf		(substituted on) 64'
DF	14	(Hungary) Attila Osváth
MF	15	(Israel) Mohammad Abu Fani	(yellow card) 114'	(substituted on) 79'
MF	17	(Romania) Marius Corbu		(substituted on) 91'
MF	22	(Hungary) Gábor Szalai	(yellow card) 87'	(substituted on) 79'
MF	66	(Brazil) Júlio Romão
FW	76	(Hungary) Krisztián Lisztes		(substituted on) 106'
DF	77	(Hungary) Barnabás Nagy		(substituted on) 98'
MF	80	(Ivory Coast) Habib Maïga
Manager:
(Republic of Ireland) Robbie Keane

GK	1	(Hungary) Bence Gundel-Takács
RB	8	(Hungary) András Csonka		(substituted off) 91'
CB	55	(Nigeria) Akpe Victory
CB	5	(Hungary) Bence Várkonyi
LB	18	(Spain) José Calderón
RM	49	(Hungary) Bence Kiss		(substituted off) 110'
CM	30	(Argentina) Fabricio Amato
CM	11	(Hungary) Norbert Szendrei (c)	(yellow card) 100'
LM	7	(Hungary) Alen Skribek
RF	23	(Brazil) Maxsuell Alegria		(substituted off) 64'
LF	70	(Brazil) João Victor		(substituted off) 90'
Substitutes:
GK	31	(Slovenia) Žan Mauricio
GK	89	(Hungary) Vilmos Borsos
DF	4	(Costa Rica) Joseth Peraza
FW	9	(Brazil) Daniel		(substituted on) 64'
FW	12	(Mexico) David López		(substituted on) 91'
MF	17	(Brazil) Guilherme Teixeira	(yellow card) 96'	(substituted on) 90'
DF	19	(Hungary) Viktor Petrók
DF	32	(Brazil) Lucas Alfonso		(substituted on) 110'
DF	33	(Brazil) Diogo Silva
MF	47	(France) Queyrell Tchicamboud
FW	73	(Moldova) Ștefan Bîtca
Manager:
(Portugal) Nuno Campos

Man of the Match:
Toon Raemaekers (Ferencváros)

Assistant referees:
Balázs Buzás
Gergő Vígh-Tarsonyi
Fourth official:
Marcell Derdák
Video assistant referee:
Gergő Bogár
Assistant video assistant referee:
Gergely Becséri

**Match rules**

- 90 minutes
- 30 minutes of extra time if necessary
- Penalty shoot-out if scores still level
- Twelve named substitutes
- Maximum of five substitutions, with a sixth allowed in extra time

A panorama of the choreography taking place before the match

== See also ==
- 2025–26 Nemzeti Bajnokság I
