= 2025–26 Zalaegerszegi TE season =

Zalaegerszeg
2025–26 season
- Chairman: Andrés Jornet and Damián Pedrosa
- Manager: Nuno Campos (From 24 June 2025)
- Stadium: ZTE Arena
- Nemzeti Bajnokság I: 5th
- Magyar Kupa: (silver) Runners-up
- Top goalscorer: League: Skribek (10); All: Skribek (11)
- Highest home attendance: 6,148 (v Ferencváros, Nemzeti Bajnokság, Round 22, 14 February 2026)
- Lowest home attendance: 1,497 (v Budafok, Magyar Kupa, Round of 32, 30 October 2025)
- Average home league attendance: 3,374
- Biggest win: 13 goals, (13–0) v Vásárosnamény (A), Magyar Kupa, Round of 64, 13 September 2025
- Biggest defeat: 3 goals, (1–4) v Újpest (H), Nemzeti Bajnokság, Round 5, 23 August 2025, (0–3) v Ferencváros (A), Nemzeti Bajnokság, Round 33, 16 May 2026
- All statistics correct as of 16 May 2026.

The 2025–26 season is Zalaegerszegi TE's 45th competitive season, 7th consecutive season in the Nemzeti Bajnokság I and 105th year in existence as a football club. In addition to the domestic league, Zalaegerszeg participate in this season's editions of the Magyar Kupa.

Zalaegerszeg entered the Round of 64 of the Hungarian Cup (Magyar Kupa) and advanced to the next round by defeating fourth-division team Vásárosnamény 13–0 away.

== Kits ==
Supplier: Macron / Sponsor: Tippmix

Home	Away

Goalkeeper^{1}	Goalkeeper^{2}

== First team squad ==
As of 17 March 2026

Note: Flags indicate national team as defined under FIFA eligibility rules; some limited exceptions apply. Players may hold more than one non-FIFA nationality.

No.	Pos.	Nation	Player
1	GK	HUN	Bence Gundel-Takács
2	DF	USA	Aiden Harangi
3	DF	PAR	Fernando Vera
4	DF	CRC	Joseth Peraza
5	DF	HUN	Bence Várkonyi
6	FW	HUN	Gergely Mim
7	FW	HUN	Alen Skribek
8	MF	HUN	András Csonka
9	FW	BRA	Daniel (on loan from (Brazil) Atlético Goianiense)
11	MF	HUN	Norbert Szendrei (captain)
12	FW	MEX	David López
15	MF	ARG	Nicolás Elosú
16	MF	NED	Divaio Bobson
17	MF	BRA	Guilherme Teixeira
18	DF	ESP	José Calderón
19	DF	HUN	Viktor Petrók
20	DF	POR	André Ferreira
21	DF	HUN	Dániel Csóka

No.	Pos.	Nation	Player
23	FW	BRA	Maxsuell Alegria
30	MF	ARG	Fabricio Amato (on loan from (Argentina) Estudiantes de La Plata)
31	GK	SLO	Žan Mauricio
32	FW	ARG	Lucas Alfonso
33	DF	BRA	Diogo Silva
42	GK	HUN	Martin Barbarics
47	MF	FRA	Queyrell Tchicamboud
49	MF	HUN	Bence Kiss
55	DF	NGR	Akpe Victory
58	MF	HUN	Dániel Mulasics
59	FW	HUN	Gergő Wolf
70	FW	BRA	João Victor
73	FW	MDA	Ștefan Bîtca (on loan from (Moldova) Zimbru Chișinău)
77	MF	HUN	Csongor Papp
80	FW	BRA	Marlon Santos
89	GK	HUN	Vilmos Borsos
99	DF	HUN	Zétény Garai

== Transfers ==
=== Summer ===
In
Date	No.	Pos.	Nat.	Player	Moving from	Fee	Ref.
29 May 2025	70	MF	Hungary	Csongor Papp	Szentlőrinc (NB II) (loan)	Returned from loan	
29 May 2025	18	DF	Hungary	András Huszti	Fehérvár (loan)	Returned from loan	
30 May 2025	67	MF	Hungary	Balázs Bakti	Puskás Akadémia (loan)	After loan permanently	
5 June 2025	19	DF	Hungary	Milán Klausz	Nafta Lendava	Returned from loan	
4 July 2025	3	DF	Hungary	Zsombor Nagy	MTK	Free agent	
10 July 2025	31	GK	Croatia	Žan Mauricio Lalović	NK Nafta	Undisclosed	
17 July 2025	70	FW	Brazil	João Victor	Ceará	€200,000	
12 August 2025	12	DF	Mexico	David López	Deportivo Toluca (U21)	Free agent	
21 August 2025	2	DF	Hungary	Gergő Bodnár	Vasas (NB II)	Free agent	
3 September 2025	18	DF	Spain	José Calderón	Córdoba	Free agent	
4 September 2025	56	DF	Brazil	Diego Borges	Santos U20	Free agent	

Loaned from
Date	No.	Pos.	Nat.	Player	Moving from	Until	Ref.
2 June 2025	27	DF	Hungary	Ábel Krajcsovics	Bp. Honvéd (NB II)	30 June 2026	
28 June 2025	7	FW	Hungary	Alen Skribek	Paks	30 June 2026	
1 July 2025	30	MF	Argentina	Fabricio Amato	Estudiantes de La Plata	30 June 2026	
2 July 2025	4	DF	Costa Rica	Joseth Peraza	San Carlos	30 June 2026	
4 August 2025	23	FW	Brazil	Maxsuell Alegria	Vasco da Gama	30 June 2026	
30 August 2025	9	FW	Brazil	Daniel	Atlético Goianiense	30 June 2026	
4 September 2025	73	FW	Moldova	Ștefan Bîtca	Zimbru Chișinău	30 June 2026	

Out
Date	No.	Pos.	Nat.	Player	Moving to	Fee	Ref.
5 June 2025	18	MF	Montenegro	Bojan Sanković	Nyíregyháza	Free	
20 June 2025		DF	Hungary	Szabolcs Szalay	Csíkszereda	Undisclosed	
21 June 2025	23	MF	Slovakia	Sinan Medgyes	Kisvárda	Contracts expire	
21 June 2025	3	DF	Ukraine	Oleksandr Safronov	Unirea Slobozia	Contracts expire	
21 June 2025	41	DF	Greece	Stefanos Evangelou	Nyíregyháza	Contracts expire	
23 June 2025	9	DF	Hungary	Máté Sajbán	Diósgyőr	Undisclosed	
30 June 2025	7	DF	Bosnia and Herzegovina	Marko Čubrilo	Radnik Bijeljina	Undisclosed	
4 July 2025	25	MF	Nigeria	Jack Ipalibo	Torreense	Contracts expire	
1 September 2025	99	MF	Hungary	Csanád Dénes	Kortrijk	Undisclosed	
3 September 2025	10	MF	France	Yohan Croizet	Diósgyőr	Undisclosed	
3 September 2025	18	DF	Hungary	András Huszti	TBD	Mutual of agreement	
3 September 2025		GK	Hungary	Zsombor Senkó	Nafta 1903	Did not return from loan	

Returned to his club after his loan contract expired
Date	No.	Pos.	Nat.	Player	Moving to	Ref.
30 June 2025	19	FW	Slovakia	Ladislav Almási	Baník Ostrava	

Out on loan
Date	No.	Pos.	Nat.	Player	Moving to	Loan date	Ref.
12 July 2025	22	GK	Hungary	Ervin Németh	Nafta 1903	30 June 2026	
29 August 2025	97	FW	Hungary	Dániel Németh	Videoton (NB II)	30 June 2026	

=== Winter ===
Out
Date	No.	Pos.	Nat.	Player	Moving to	Fee	Ref.
17 March 2026	56	MF	Brazil	Diego Borges	Sporting Kansas City	Free agent	

=== Contract renewals ===
Date	No.	Pos.	Nat.	Player	Extension to	Ref.
23 July 2025	11	DF	Hungary	Norbert Szendrei	30 June 2027	
19 December 2025	49	MF	Hungary	Bence Kiss	30 June 2027	

== Friendlies ==
Win Draw Loss Fixtures

=== Pre-season ===
2 July 2025 Friendly	Zalaegerszeg	2–1	Ajka (NB II)	Zalaegerszeg
10:30 CEST		Report		Stadium: ZTE Arena; Attendance: 0 (Closed doors)

5 July 2025 Friendly	Beltinci (Slovenian II) (Slovenia)	0–2	Zalaegerszeg	Lendava
		Report	Krajcsovics; Skribek

9 July 2025 Friendly	Oleksandriya (Ukrainian I) (Ukraine)	0–1	Zalaegerszeg
		Report	Dénes 17'

12 July 2025 Friendly	Mura (Slovenian I) (Slovenia)	1–3	Zalaegerszeg
	Glavan 64'	Report	Skribek 8' (pen.), 50'; Dénes 70'

19 July 2025 Friendly	Zalaegerszeg	0–1	(England) Leicester City (Premier League)	Zalaegerszeg
18:30 CEST		Report	Ayew 70'	Stadium: ZTE Arena; Referee: Attila Molnár; Assistant referees: Milán Mohos, Gábor Mayer
Note: • Zalaegerszeg: Gundel-Takács — Nyíri, Várkonyi, Csóka, Cs. Papp — Szendrei, Csonka — Dénes, B. Kiss, Skribek — Bakti • Substitutions: Croizet, Krajcsovics, Peraza, D. Németh, Amato, Zs. Nagy, Klausz • Manager: Campos

=== Mid-season ===
5 September 2025 Friendly	Zalaegerszeg	1–1	Videoton (NB II)	Zalaegerszeg
	Lima 66'; Skribek (penalty missed) 77'	Report	Bertók 88'	Stadium: ZTE Arena; Attendance: 0 (Closed doors)

9 October 2025 Friendly	Lokomotiva (Croatian I) (Croatia)	0–2	Zalaegerszeg	Zalaegerszeg
		Report	Nyíri 54'; João Victor 75'	Stadium: ZTE Arena

Winter training camp in Umag, Croatia from 8 January until 17 January 2026.

17 January 2026 Friendly	Gorica (Croatian I) (Croatia)	1–0	Zalaegerszeg	Umag, Croatia
10:30	Duraković 33'	Report
Note: • Zalaegerszeg: Gundel-Takács — Csonka, Peraza, Várkonyi, Calderón — B. Kiss, Elosú (Bakti (substituted on) 46'), N. Szendrei, Skribek — Maxsuell (Bobson (substituted on) 82'), João Victor • Manager: Campos

17 January 2026 Friendly	Koper (Slovenian I) (Slovenia)	3–1	Zalaegerszeg	Umag, Croatia
13:00	Iličić 14'; Mittendorfer 50'; Oddei 78'	Report	Divaio 27'
Note: • Zalaegerszeg: Mauricio (Borsos (substituted on) 67') — Zs. Nagy, Daniel, David López, Nyíri, Elosú, Divaio (Ayodele (substituted on) 71'), Victory, Borges, Bakti (Leonardy (substituted on) 52'), Cs. Papp (Csóka (substituted on) 46') • Manager: Campos

== Competitions ==
=== Overall record ===
In italics, we indicate the Last match and the Final position achieved in competition(s) that have not yet been completed.

Competition	First match	Last match	Starting round	Final position	Record							
Competition	First match	Last match	Starting round	Final position	Pld	W	D	L	GF	GA	GD	Win %
Nemzeti Bajnokság I	26 July 2025	16 May 2026	Matchday 1	5th	33	13	9	11	49	43	+6	39.39
Magyar Kupa	13 September 2025	9 May 2026	Round of 64	(silver) Runners-up	6	4	1	1	21	5	+16	66.67
Total					39	17	10	12	70	48	+22	43.59

Last updated: complete
Source: Soccerway

=== Nemzeti Bajnokság I ===
==== League table ====
Pos	Team	Pld	W	D	L	GF	GA	GD	Pts	Qualification or relegation
3	Paks	33	15	8	10	63	46	+17	53	Qualification for the Conference League second qualifying round
4	Debrecen	33	14	11	8	51	41	+10	53	Qualification for the Conference League second qualifying round
5	Zalaegerszeg	33	13	9	11	49	43	+6	48	
6	Puskás Akadémia	33	13	7	13	43	43	0	46	
7	Újpest	33	11	7	15	48	57	−9	40	

Source: Hungarian Football Federation (in Hungarian)
Rules for classification: 1) Points; 2) Matches won; 3) Goal difference; 4) Goals scored; 5) Head-to-head points; 6) Head-to-head goal difference; 7) Fair play ranking; 8) Drawing of lots.

==== Results summary ====
Overall								Home						Away					
Pld	W	D	L	GF	GA	GD	Pts	W	D	L	GF	GA	GD	W	D	L	GF	GA	GD
33	13	9	11	49	43	+6	48	8	4	5	30	19	+11	5	5	6	19	24	−5

Last updated: 16 May 2026.
Source: Soccerway

==== Matches ====
Win Draw Loss Fixtures Postponed

The draw for the 2025/26 season was held on 16 June 2025.

26 July 2025 1	Zalaegerszeg	3–3	Debrecen	Zalaegerszeg
17:45 CEST	Dénes 23'; Cs. Papp (yellow card) 42'; João Victor 45+6'; B. Kiss (yellow card) 45+3'; Skribek 71'	Report	Szuhodovszki (yellow card) 6'; Bárány (penalty missed) 42'; Dzsudzsák 44'; D. Kocsis (yellow card) 68'; Bárány 67', 89'	Stadium: ZTE Arena; Attendance: 2,844; Referee: Mihály Káprály; Assistant referees: Balázs Szalai, Zoltán Horváth
Note: • Zalaegerszeg: Gundel-Takács — Nyíri (Bakti (substituted on) 13'), Várkonyi, Csóka, Cs. Papp (Zs. Nagy (substituted on) 76') — N. Szendrei (c), Csonka — Dénes (D. Németh (substituted on) 76'), B. Kiss, Skribek (Krajcsovics (substituted on) 76') — Croizet (João Victor (substituted on) 27') • Manager: Campos (yellow card) (yellow-red card) 90+1' • Player of the match: João Victor, Zalaegerszeg 8.4 • Best player of Debrecen: Balázs Dzsudzsák 8.2

26 July 2025 2	Diósgyőr	2–2	Zalaegerszeg	Miskolc
17:45 CEST	Kecskés (yellow card) 21'; Demeter 37'; Požeg Vancaš 45+4'; Holdampf (yellow card) 52'; Šaponjić (yellow card) 77'; Komlósi (yellow card) 89'	Report	Várkonyi (yellow card) 45+6' (red card) 86'; João Victor 57'; N. Szendrei (yellow card) 87'; B. Kiss 90'; Gundel-Takács (yellow card) 90+4'	Stadium: Diósgyőri Stadion; Attendance: 5,679; Referee: Péter Zierkelbach; Assistant referees: Balázs Szert, Bence Belicza
Note: • Zalaegerszeg: Gundel-Takács — Nyíri, Várkonyi, Csóka — Dénes (Krajcsovics (substituted on) 68'), N. Szendrei (c), João Victor (Klausz (substituted on) 75'), Cs. Papp — B. Kiss, Croizet (Bakti (substituted on) 68'), Skribek (Peraza (substituted on) 90') • Caretaker manager: Gonçalo Cruz • Player of the match: Ivan Šaponjić, Diósgyőr 8.7 • Best player of Zalaegerszeg: Bence Kiss 8.1

10 August 2025 3	Zalaegerszeg	1–1	Győri ETO	Zalaegerszeg
17:45 CEST	Skribek 20' (pen.)	Report	Pyshchur (yellow card) 5'; Boldor (yellow card) 19'; Živković (yellow card) 77'; Huszár 81'	Stadium: ZTE Arena; Attendance: 3,463; Referee: József Erdős; Assistant referees: Péter Ország, Viktor Nagy
Note: • Zalaegerszeg: Gundel-Takács — Nyíri, Peraza, Csóka — Dénes (Huszti (substituted on) 74'), B. Kiss, N. Szendrei, Cs. Papp — João Victor (Bakti (substituted on) 74'), Croizet (Klausz (substituted on) 90+1'), Skribek (Csonka (substituted on) 66') • Manager: Campos • Player of the match: Joseth Peraza, Zalaegerszeg 7.8 • Best player of Győri ETO: Marcell Huszár 7.5

17 August 2025 4	Paks	2–2	Zalaegerszeg	Paks
20:00 CEST	Papp (yellow card) 14'; Silye 49'; Lenzsér (yellow card) 90'; B. Tóth 90+3'	Report	Dénes (yellow card) 27' (yellow-red card) 72'; Várkonyi (yellow card) 38'; João Victor (yellow card) 45'; Croizet 69' (pen.); Krajcsovics 73'; Gundel-Takács (yellow card) 87'; Csonka (yellow card) 90+3'	Stadium: Fehérvári úti Stadion; Attendance: 2,512; Referee: Bence Csonka dr. Assistant referees: Péter Garai, Bence Belicza
Note: • Zalaegerszeg: Gundel-Takács — Nyíri (López (substituted on) 59'), Várkonyi, Csóka, Cs. Papp — B. Kiss (Krajcsovics (substituted on) 59'), N. Szendrei (Maxsuell (substituted on) 59') — Dénes, João Victor (Huszti (substituted on) 86'), Csonka — Croizet (Peraza (substituted on) 77') • Manager: Campos • Player of the match: Ábel Krajcsovics, Zalaegerszeg 8.2 • Best player of Paks: Erik Silye and Ákos Kinyik 8.0 each

23 August 2025 5	Zalaegerszeg	1–4	Újpest	Zalaegerszeg
17:45 CEST	Várkonyi (yellow card) 16'; Skribek 45' (pen.); López (yellow card) 87'	Report	Tučić 8', 50'; Medeiros 17' (pen.); Lacoux (yellow card) 48'; Matko (yellow card) 65'; Bese 77'; Ademi (yellow card) 88'	Stadium: ZTE Arena; Attendance: 4,464; Referee: Péter Antal; Assistant referees: Dávid Rózsa, Péter Ország
Note: • Zalaegerszeg: Gundel-Takács — Nyíri (López (substituted on) 46'), Várkonyi, Csóka, Cs. Papp — Skribek, B. Kiss (Csonka (substituted on) 46'), N. Szendrei — Krajcsovics (Bakti (substituted on) 60'), Croizet (Klausz (substituted on) 78'), João Victor • Manager: Campos • Player of the match: Milan Tučić, Újpest 8.0 • Best player of Zalaegerszeg: Alen Skribek 7.3

30 August 2025 6	Zalaegerszeg	1–2	Kisvárda	Zalaegerszeg
14:45 CEST	Csonka (yellow card) 19'; N. Szendrei (yellow card) 26'; Klausz 78'; Dénes (yellow card) 82'; Cs. Papp (yellow card) 83'	Report	Cipetić 27' (pen.) (yellow card) 83'; K. Nagy 45+1'; Körmendi (yellow card) 76'; Matić (yellow card) 88'	Stadium: ZTE Arena; Attendance: 2,209; Referee: Marcell Derdák; Assistant referees: Zoltán Horváth, József Aradi
Note: • Zalaegerszeg: Gundel-Takács — Peraza (Maxsuell (substituted on) 75'), Várkonyi, Csóka, Cs. Papp — López (Croizet (substituted on) 46'), Csonka (B. Kiss (substituted on) 46'), N. Szendrei (c), Skribek (Bakti (substituted on) 46') — Dénes, João Victor (Klausz (substituted on) 46') • Manager: Campos • Player of the match: Norbert Szendrei, Zalaegerszeg 7.9 • Best player of Kisvárda: Branimir Cipetić 7.8

21 September 2025 7	MTK	1–0	Zalaegerszeg	Budapest
20:00 CEST	P. Kovács (yellow card) 67'; Á. Molnár 75'; K. Németh (yellow card) 85'	Report	Csóka (yellow card) 40'; Peraza (yellow card) 67'; N. Szendrei (yellow card) 90+6'	Stadium: Hidegkuti Nándor Stadion; Attendance: 2,403; Referee: József Erdős; Assistant referees: Gergely Becséri, Ákos Berényi
Note: • Zalaegerszeg: Gundel-Takács — Peraza, Várkonyi, Csóka (Borges (substituted on) 46') — G. Bodnár, Csonka, N. Szendrei (c), Cs. Papp (Bîtca (substituted on) 56') — João Victor (Klausz (substituted on) 78'), Daniel (Bakti (substituted on) 63'), Skribek (Maxsuell (substituted on) 56') • Manager: Campos • Player of the match: Ádin Molnár, MTK 7.6 • Best player of Zalaegerszeg: Norbert Szendrei 7.4

27 September 2025 8	Zalaegerszeg	5–0	Kazincbarcika	Zalaegerszeg
15:30 CEST	João Victor 11'; Csonka (yellow card) 45+1'; Maxsuell 48'; Borges (yellow card) 60' (yellow-red card) 71'; Daniel 67'; B. Kiss 77', 78'	Report	Berecz (yellow card) 13'; Haroyan (yellow card) 26'; Meskhi (yellow card) 39'; Eleke (yellow card) 63'	Stadium: ZTE Arena; Attendance: 2,141; Referee: Marcell Derdák; Assistant referees: Norbert Bornemissza, Georgiou Theodoros
Note: • Zalaegerszeg: Gundel-Takács — Peraza, Várkonyi, Borges — G. Bodnár, Csonka (Amato (substituted on) 62'), N. Szendrei (c), Bîtca (Calderón (substituted on) 87') – João Victor (B. Kiss (substituted on) 62'), Maxsuell (Csóka (substituted on) 74') — Daniel (Krajcsovics (substituted on) 74') • Manager: Campos • Player of the match: Bence Kiss, Zalaegerszeg 9.1 • Best player of Kazincbarcika: Mykhaylo Meskhi 6.8

4 October 2025 9	Nyíregyháza	3–1	Zalaegerszeg	Nyíregyháza
14:15 CEST	Evangelou (yellow card) 38'; B. Katona 48'; Májer (yellow card) 63'; Benczenleitner 80'; M. Kovács 85'	Report	Bîtca (yellow card) 22'; Daniel 36' (yellow card) 38'; Csonka (yellow card) 63'; G. Bodnár (yellow card) 74'	Stadium: Városi Stadion; Attendance: 4,246; Referee: Márió Zimmermann; Assistant referees: Balázs Szert, Ákos Berényi
Note: • Zalaegerszeg: Gundel-Takács — Nyíri (Klausz (substituted on) 83'), Várkonyi, Csóka — G. Bodnár, Csonka (B. Kiss (substituted on) 65'), N. Szendrei (c), Bîtca (Cs. Papp (substituted on) 65') — João Victor (Amato (substituted on) 65'), Daniel, Maxsuell (Skribek (substituted on) 73') • Manager: Campos • Player of the match: Bálint Katona, Nyíregyháza 8.3 • Best player of Zalaegerszeg: Ștefan Bîtca 7.1

19 October 2025 10	Zalaegerszeg	0–1	Puskás Akadémia	Zalaegerszeg
15:30 CEST	Csonka (yellow card) 29'; B. Kiss (yellow card) 60'; Amato (yellow card) 77'; N. Szendrei (yellow card) 86'; Krajcsovics (yellow card) 90+6'	Report	Ormonde-Ottewill (yellow card) 36'; Lukács 71'; Colley (yellow card) 77'	Stadium: ZTE Arena; Attendance: 3,612; Referee: Imre Kovács; Assistant referees: Balázs Huszár, Zoltán Horváth
Note: • Zalaegerszeg: Gundel-Takács — G. Bodnár, Várkonyi, Borges, Calderón — N. Szendrei (c), Amato, Csonka (João Victor (substituted on) 64') — B. Kiss (Klausz (substituted on) 78'), Daniel, Maxsuell (Krajcsovics (substituted on) 78') • Manager: Campos • Player of the match: Dániel Lukács, Puskás Akadémia 7.7 • Best player of Zalaegerszeg: Gergő Bodnár 7.5

26 October 2025 11	Ferencváros	1–2	Zalaegerszeg	Budapest
17:30 CET	B. Varga 34'; N. Keïta (yellow card) 45+2'; Ötvös (yellow card) 83'	Report	Skribek 42'; Calderón 54'; N. Szendrei (yellow card) 60'; G. Bodnár (yellow card) 69'; Gundel-Takács (yellow card) 90+5'	Stadium: Groupama Aréna; Attendance: 8,697; Referee: Péter Antal; Assistant referees: József Aradi, Viktor Nagy
Note: • Zalaegerszeg: Gundel-Takács — G. Bodnár (Nyíri (substituted on) 90+2'), Várkonyi, Borges (Peraza (substituted on) 90+2'), Calderón — B. Kiss, Skribek (David López (substituted on) 80'), N. Szendrei (c), Amato — Maxsuell (Bakti (substituted on) 90+2'), João Victor (Daniel (substituted on) 90+2') • Manager: Campos • Player of the match: Bence Gundel-Takács, Zalaegerszeg 8.7 • Best player of Ferencváros: Gábor Szalai 7.5

2 November 2025 12	Debrecen	2–1	Zalaegerszeg	Debrecen
18:00 CET	Bárány 17'; D. Kocsis 31'; Hofmann (yellow card) 49'; Youga (yellow card) 90+3'	Report	Maxsuell (yellow card) 47'; Skribek 90+5'	Stadium: Nagyerdei Stadion; Attendance: 4,344
Note: • Zalaegerszeg: Gundel-Takács — G. Bodnár, Peraza, Várkonyi (c), Calderón — B. Kiss (Bîtca (substituted on) 84'), Csonka (Klausz (substituted on) 70'), Amato, Skribek — João Victor (Krajcsovics (substituted on) 67'), Maxsuell • Manager: Campos • Player of the match: Josua Mejías, Debrecen 8.3 • Best player of Zalaegerszeg: Alen Skribek 7.8

8 November 2025 13	Zalaegerszeg	2–0	Diósgyőr	Zalaegerszeg
14:45 CET	Peraza (yellow card) 46'; Skribek 55'; Daniel 89'	Report	Vallejo (yellow card) 46'; Holdampf (yellow card) 48'; Mi. Mucsányi (yellow card) 67'; Szakos (yellow card) 75'	Stadium: ZTE Arena; Attendance: 2,610; Referee: Ferenc Karakó; Assistant referees: Péter Kóbor, Dávid Rózsa
Note: • Zalaegerszeg: Gundel-Takács — G. Bodnár (Nyíri (substituted on) 80'), Peraza, Várkonyi, Calderón — B. Kiss (López (substituted on) 90+2'), Amato, N. Szendrei (c), Skribek (Klausz (substituted on) 90+2') — João Victor (Krajcsovics (substituted on) 71'), Maxsuell (Daniel (substituted on) 80') • Manager: Campos (yellow card) 51' • Player of the match: Alen Skribek, Zalaegerszeg 8.2 • Best player of Diósgyőr: Elton Acolatse 6.7

21 November 2025 14	Győri ETO	0–1	Zalaegerszeg	Győr
20:00 CET	Vitális (yellow card) 60'; Vlădoiu (yellow card) 74'	Report	N. Szendrei (yellow card) 53'; Várkonyi (yellow card) 55'; João Victor (yellow card) 68'; Bakti 82'	Stadium: ETO Park; Attendance: 1,906; Referee: Bence Csonka dr. Assistant referees: Georgiou Theodoros, József Aradi
Note: • Zalaegerszeg: Gundel-Takács — G. Bodnár (López (substituted on) 90+2'), Peraza, Várkonyi, Calderón — B. Kiss (Nyíri (substituted on) 90+2'), Amato, N. Szendrei (c), Skribek (Bakti (substituted on) 77') — Maxsuell (Krajcsovics (substituted on) 84'), João Victor (Daniel (substituted on) 77') • Manager: Campos • Player of the match: Bence Gundel-Takács, Zalaegerszeg 8.5 • Best player of Győri ETO: Szabolcs Schön 7.7

29 November 2025 15	Zalaegerszeg	1–0	Paks	Zalaegerszeg
12:30 CET	B. Kiss (yellow card) 52'; Amato (yellow card) 56'; Krajcsovics (yellow card) 71'; Calderón (yellow card) 83'; N. Szendrei 90+3' (yellow card) 90+3'	Report	Kinyik (yellow card) 12'; Osváth (yellow card) 44'; Papp (yellow card) 55'; Hahn (yellow card) 83'	Stadium: ZTE Arena; Attendance: 1,872; Referee: Péter Zierkelbach; Assistant referees: Balázs Huszár, István Szécsényi
Note: • Zalaegerszeg: Gundel-Takács — G. Bodnár, Peraza, Várkonyi, Calderón — Bakti (Krajcsovics (substituted on) 70'), Amato, N. Szendrei (c), B. Kiss (Csonka (substituted on) 80') — João Victor (Daniel (substituted on) 70'), Maxsuell (López (substituted on) 90+3') • Manager: Campos • Player of the match: Norbert Szendrei, Zalaegerszeg 8.5 • Best player of Paks: Márió Zeke 8.3

7 December 2025 16	Újpest	0–2	Zalaegerszeg	Budapest
19:30 CET	Tajti (yellow card) 16'	Report	João Victor 58' (yellow card) 58'; G. Bodnár (yellow card) 81'; Krajcsovics 90+2'	Stadium: Szusza Ferenc Stadion; Attendance: 3,057; Referee: Márton Rúsz; Assistant referees: Gergő Vígh-Tarsonyi, Balázs Szalai
Note: • Zalaegerszeg: Gundel-Takács — G. Bodnár (Nyíri (substituted on) 90+1'), Peraza, Várkonyi, Csonka — B. Kiss (López (substituted on) 90+1'), Amato, N. Szendrei (c), Skribek (Bakti (substituted on) 75') — João Victor (Daniel (substituted on) 75'), Maxsuell (Krajcsovics (substituted on) 81') • Manager: Campos • Player of the match: Alen Skribek, Zalaegerszeg 7.8 • Best player of Újpest: Damian Rasak 7.3

14 December 2025 17	Kisvárda	3–3	Zalaegerszeg	Kisvárda
18:45 CET	Yordanov 4'; Chlumecký 8'; G. Molnár (yellow card) 50'; Cipetić (yellow card) 73'; Szőr 76'; Melnyk (yellow card) 85'; Jovičić (yellow card) 90'	Report	N. Szendrei (yellow card) 10' (yellow-red card) 90+3'; Skribek 18'; Maxsuell 33'; Amato 60'; Várkonyi (yellow card) 71'; Calderón (yellow card) 85' (yellow-red card) 90+4'	Stadium: Várkerti Stadion; Attendance: 1,570; Referee: Marcell Derdák; Assistant referees: Ákos Berényi, Dávid Rózsa
Note: • Zalaegerszeg: Gundel-Takács — G. Bodnár, Borges, Várkonyi, Calderón — B. Kiss (Csonka (substituted on) 84'), N. Szendrei (c), Amato, Skribek (Bakti (substituted on) 73') — João Victor (Daniel (substituted on) 73'), Maxsuell (Krajcsovics (substituted on) 84') • Manager: Campos • Player of the match: Tonislav Yordanov, Kisvárda 7.8 • Best player of Zalaegerszeg: Fabricio Amato 7.8

20 December 2025 18	Zalaegerszeg	1–1	MTK	Zalaegerszeg
13:00 CET	Bakti (yellow card) 63'; Skribek (penalty missed) 82'; Cs. Papp (yellow card) 89'; Klausz 90+1'	Report	Á. Molnár 29' (yellow card) 42'; Beriashvili (yellow card) 81'; K. Németh (yellow card) 90+3'; Fadgyas (yellow card) 90+4'	Stadium: ZTE Arena; Attendance: 2,350; Referee: Bence Csonka dr. Assistant referees: Balázs Szalai, Péter Ország
Note: • Zalaegerszeg: Gundel-Takács — G. Bodnár, Peraza, Várkonyi (c), Zs. Nagy (Bakti (substituted on) 35') — B. Kiss (Klausz (substituted on) 64'), Amato, Csonka (Cs. Papp (substituted on) 73'), Skribek — João Victor (Daniel (substituted on) 46'), Maxsuell • Manager: Campos • Player of the match: Bence Várkonyi, Zalaegerszeg 8.0 • Best player of MTK: Tamás Fadgyas 7.6

25 January 2026 19	Kazincbarcika	0–1	Zalaegerszeg	Miskolc
15:00 CET	Juhász (red card) 63'; Deutsch (yellow card) 79'; Pukhtieiev (yellow card) 84'	Report	B. Kiss 76'	Stadium: Diósgyőri Stadion; Attendance: 437; Referee: Mihály Káprály; Assistant referees: Gergely Becséri, Dávid Rózsa
Note: • Zalaegerszeg: Gundel-Takács — N. Szendrei (c), Daniel, Várkonyi, Csonka (López (substituted on) 72') — B. Kiss (Bobson (substituted on) 90+3'), Amato (Bakti (substituted on) 72'), Skribek (Elosú (substituted on) 79'), Borges — Calderón, Maxsuell (João Victor (substituted on) 79') • Manager: Campos • Player of the match: Norbert Szendrei, Zalaegerszeg 8.2 • Best player of Kazincbarcika: Bence Juhász 7.4

1 February 2026 20	Zalaegerszeg	0–1	Nyíregyháza	Zalaegerszeg
19:45 CET	Csonka (yellow card) 52'; López (yellow card) 74'; Várkonyi (yellow card) 83'	Report	Tijani (yellow card) 17' (goal) 58'; M. Kovács (yellow card) 23'; Kvasina (yellow card) 76'	Stadium: ZTE Arena; Attendance: 1,700; Referee: Imre Kovács; Assistant referees: Gergő Vígh-Tarsonyi, István Szécsényi
Note: • Zalaegerszeg: Gundel-Takács — Csonka (López (substituted on) 72'), Várkonyi, Peraza, Calderón — B. Kiss (Victory (substituted on) 85'), Amato (João Victor (substituted on) 76'), N. Szendrei (c), Skribek — Daniel, Maxsuell • Manager: Campos • Player of the match: Dániel Kovács, Nyíregyháza 8.2 • Best player of Zalaegerszeg: Maxsuell Alegria 7.6

8 February 2026 21	Puskás Akadémia	0–1	Zalaegerszeg	Felcsút
15:00 CET	Okeke (yellow card) 29'	Report	Skribek 50'; Peraza (yellow card) 85'; João Victor (yellow card) 89'	Stadium: Pancho Aréna; Attendance: 500; Referee: Márió Zimmermann; Assistant referees: Zoltán Horváth, József Aradi
Note: • Zalaegerszeg: Gundel-Takács — Csonka, Victory, Peraza, Calderón — B. Kiss (Elosú (substituted on) 90'), Amato, N. Szendrei (c), Skribek (Daniel (substituted on) 76') — João Victor, Maxsuell (López (substituted on) 84') • Manager: Campos • Player of the match: Bence Gundel-Takács, Zalaegerszeg 8.4 • Best player of Puskás Akadémia: Laros Duarte 7.4

14 February 2026 22	Zalaegerszeg	3–1	Ferencváros	Zalaegerszeg
17:00 CET	Calderón 65'; Amato (yellow card) 74'; Várkonyi (yellow card) 76'; Skribek 89' (pen.); Daniel 90+8' (yellow card) 90+8'	Report	Ötvös 13'; Cissé (red card) 28'; B. Nagy (yellow card) 90+5'	Stadium: ZTE Arena; Attendance: 6,148; Referee: Mihály Káprály; Assistant referees: Dániel Szalai, Viktor Nagy
Note: • Zalaegerszeg: Gundel-Takács — Csonka (Ferreira (substituted on) 46'), Peraza, Várkonyi, Calderón — B. Kiss (Victory (substituted on) 90+5'), N. Szendrei (c), Amato, Skribek (López (substituted on) 90+2') — João Victor, Maxsuell (Daniel (substituted on) 61') • Manager: Campos (yellow card) 74' • Player of the match: Bence Ötvös, Ferencváros 8.1 • Best player of Zalaegerszeg: Daniel 7.6

22 February 2026 23	Zalaegerszeg	1–1	Debrecen	Zalaegerszeg
14:45 CET	Peraza 24' (yellow card) 27'; Calderón (yellow card) 40'; B. Kiss (yellow card) 85'	Report	Szuhodovszki (yellow card) 54'; Guerrero 65'; Gordić (yellow card) 66'; Mejias (yellow card) 83'; Bárány (yellow card) 89'	Stadium: ZTE Arena; Attendance: 3,521; Referee: Péter Zierkelbach; Assistant referees: Péter Kóbor, Péter Ország
Note: • Player of the match: Norbert Szendrei, Zalaegerszeg 7.8 • Best player of Debrecen: Adrián Guerrero 7.1

28 February 2026 24	Diósgyőr	1–1	Zalaegerszeg	Miskolc
17:00 CET	Bényei (yellow card) 12'; Bokros (yellow card) 17'; Babos 57' (yellow card) 84'	Report	Calderón (yellow card) 84'; Victory 85'; Maxsuell (yellow card) 90+3'	Stadium: Diósgyőri Stadion; Attendance: 1,423; Referee: Gergő Bogár; Assistant referees: István Albert, Bence Belicza

7 March 2026 25	Zalaegerszeg	2–1	Győri ETO	Zalaegerszeg
17:00 CET	João Victor 3'; Maxsuell 83'; B. Kiss (yellow card) 90'; Amato (yellow card) 90+3'	Report	Gavrić 45+4'; R. Tóth (yellow card) 79'	Stadium: ZTE Arena; Attendance: 5,021; Referee: Ferenc Karakó; Assistant referees: Balázs Szert, Péter Ország
Note: • Zalaegerszeg: Gundel-Takács — Csonka, Peraza (Victory (substituted on) 46'), Várkonyi, Calderón — B. Kiss, Amato, N. Szendrei (c), Skribek (Teixeira (substituted on) 74') — João Victor (Daniel (substituted on) 83'), Maxsuell (Alfonso (substituted on) 89') • Manager: Campos • Player of the match: Željko Gavrić, Győri ETO 7.8 • Best player of Zalaegerszeg: Maxsuell Alegria 7.5

14 March 2026 26	Paks	1–1	Zalaegerszeg	Paks
17:00 CET	Papp (yellow card) 8'; J. Szabó (yellow card) 28'; Hahn 45+1' (pen.)	Report	Várkonyi (red card) 45+1'; João Victor 52'; Maxsuell (yellow card) 64'	Stadium: Fehérvári úti Stadion; Attendance: 2,245; Referee: Bence Csonka dr. Assistant referees: Norbert Bornemissza, István Szécsényi
Note: • Zalaegerszeg: Gundel-Takács — Csonka, Victory, Várkonyi, Calderón — Teixeira (Diogo Silva (substituted on) 46'), Amato, N. Szendrei (c), Skribek (Alfonso (substituted on) 84') — João Victor (Tchicomboud (substituted on) 90'), Maxsuell (Daniel (substituted on) 74') • Manager: Campos • Player of the match: Bence Gundel-Takács, Zalaegerszeg 8.2 • Best player of Paks: Bálint Vécsei 7.9

21 March 2026 27	Zalaegerszeg	2–0	Újpest	Zalaegerszeg
16:30 CET	N. Szendrei 74'; Calderón 90+4'	Report		Stadium: ZTE Arena; Attendance: 4,445; Referee: Marcell Dedák; Assistant referees: Gergely Becséri, Viktor Nagy

4 April 2026 28	Zalaegerszeg	2–0	Kisvárda	Zalaegerszeg
14:30 CEST	João Victor 48'; Harangi 61'	Report		Stadium: ZTE Arena; Attendance: 3,328; Referee: Márton Rúsz; Assistant referees: Zoltán Horváth, Dániel Szalai
Note: • Zalaegerszeg: Gundel-Takács — Harangi (Elosú (substituted on) 71'), Victory, Várkonyi, Calderón — B. Kiss (Tchicomboud (substituted on) 84'), Csonka, N. Szendrei (c), Skribek (Teixeira (substituted on) 84') — João Victor (Daniel (substituted on) 71'), Maxsuell (Alfonso (substituted on) 71') • Manager: Campos • Player of the match: Akpe Victory, Zalaegerszeg 7.7 • Best player of Kisvárda: Hianga'a Mbock 7.0

11 April 2026 29	MTK	3–0	Zalaegerszeg	Budapest
17:45 CEST	Kerezsi 50', 64'; Armalas (yellow card) 68'; Jurek 90'	Report		Stadium: Hidegkuti Nándor Stadion; Attendance: 2,928; Referee: Bence Csonka dr. Assistant referees: Georgiou Theodoros, Balázs Szalai

18 April 2026 30	Zalaegerszeg	4–0	Kazincbarcika	Zalaegerszeg
14:15 CEST	Daniel 13'; Skribek 41'; N. Szendrei 45' (pen.); B. Kiss (yellow card) 49' (goal) 56'; Teixeira (yellow card) 90+1'	Report	Ferenczi (yellow card) 36'; Zs. Nagy (red card) 43'	Stadium: ZTE Arena; Attendance: 2,889; Referee: Imre Kovács; Assistant referees: Péter Ország, Viktor Nagy
Note: • Zalaegerszeg: Gundel-Takács — Csonka (López (substituted on) 62'), Victory, Várkonyi, Garai (Petrók (substituted on) 72') — B. Kiss (Tchicomboud (substituted on) 58'), Amato, N. Szendrei (c), Skribek (Teixeira (substituted on) 46') — João Victor (Alfonso (substituted on) 46'), Daniel • Manager: Campos • Player of the match: Bence Kiss, Zalaegerszeg 8.3 • Best player of Kazincbarcika: Vince Nyíri 7.2

25 April 2026 31	Nyíregyháza	2–1	Zalaegerszeg	Nyíregyháza
19:30 CEST	Manner 27'; Toma (yellow card) 30'; Májer (yellow card) 41'; Do. Babunski 82'	Report	López (yellow card) 57'; Amato (yellow card) 72'; Žan Mauricio (yellow card) 82' (On the bench); Teixeira 86'	Stadium: Városi Stadion; Attendance: 4,507; Referee: Márton Rúsz; Assistant referees: József Aradi, Dávid Rózsa
Note: • Zalaegerszeg: Gundel-Takács — Várkonyi, López, Victory — B. Kiss, Csonka (Bîtca (substituted on) 77'), N. Szendrei (c), Amato (Teixeira (substituted on) 77'), Maxsuell (João Victor (substituted on) 67') — Skribek (Tchicomboud (substituted on) 80'), Daniel (Alfonso (substituted on) 80') • Manager: Campos • Player of the match: Norbert Szendrei, Zalaegerszeg 8.3 • Best player of Nyíregyháza: Balázs Manner 7.3

1 May 2026 32	Zalaegerszeg	1–3	Puskás Akadémia	Zalaegerszeg
20:00 CEST	Csonka 7'; Maxsuell (yellow card) 37'; López (yellow card) 65'	Report	L. Duarte (yellow card) 11'; A. Németh 15' (yellow card) 25'; Lukács 27'; Okeke (yellow card) 33'; Zs. Nagy 79'; Markgráf (yellow card) 89'	Stadium: ZTE Arena; Attendance: 4,732; Referee: Péter Zierkelbach; Assistant referees: Zoltán Horváth, Viktor Nagy
Note: • Zalaegerszeg: Gundel-Takács — Csonka, Victory, Várkonyi, López (Bîtca (substituted on) 72') — Amato, N. Szendrei (c) — B. Kiss, Maxsuell (Alfonso (substituted on) 86'), Skribek — João Victor (Daniel (substituted on) 72') • Manager: Campos • Player of the match: Péter Szappanos, Puskás Akadémia 8.0 • Best player of Zalaegerszeg: Fabricio Amato 7.5

16 May 2026 33	Ferencváros	3–0	Zalaegerszeg	Budapest
17:15 CEST	Victory 57' (o.g.); Gómez (yellow card) 62'; Yusuf 84'; Zachariassen 90+2'	Report	Calderón (yellow card) 90+1'	Stadium: Groupama Aréna; Attendance: 13,157; Referee: Tamás Bognár; Assistant referees: Péter Kóbor, Bence Belicza

=== Magyar Kupa ===
13 September 2025 R64	Vásárosnamény (MB I)	0–13	Zalaegerszeg	Vásárosnamény
14:00 CEST	Hadadi (red card) 45'	Report	Géci 8', 78' (o.g.); Skribek 12' (pen.); João Victor 30'; Bodnár 32'; Maxsuell 48'; Klausz 59'; Daniel 61', 77', 80'; Diego Borges 63'; Csonka 67'; Bîtca 83'	Stadium: Sportpálya; Attendance: 1,200; Referee: Márió Zimmermann; Assistant referees: Ákos Berényi, Gyula Punyi
Note: • Zalaegerszeg: Mauricio — Várkonyi, Peraza, Cs. Papp (Diego Borges (substituted on) 58') — N. Szendrei (c) (Klausz (substituted on) 46'), Skribek (Maxsuell (substituted on) 46'), Csonka, Bodnár, Zs. Nagy (Bîtca (substituted on) 58') — Daniel, João Victor (Amato (substituted on) 46') • Manager: Campos

30 October 2025 R32	Zalaegerszeg	3–1	Budafok (NB II)	Zalaegerszeg
18:00 CET	N. Szendrei 14' (pen.); Bakti 53'; Krajcsovics 54'	Report	Posztobányi (yellow card) 36'; Horgosi 47'; Gy. Varga (yellow card) 87'	Stadium: ZTE Arena; Attendance: 1,497; Referee: Tamás Sipos; Assistant referees: Dániel Szalai, Zsolt Király
Note: • Zalaegerszeg: Mauricio — Bodnár (Nyíri (substituted on) 65'), Peraza (Zs. Nagy (substituted on) 73'), Várkonyi, Calderón — Csonka (Amato (substituted on) 65'), N. Szendrei (c) — B. Kiss (Bîtca (substituted on) 58'), Krajcsovics, Bakti — Daniel (Klausz (substituted on) 58') • Manager: Campos

11 February 2026 R16	Zalaegerszeg	2–1	Vasas (NB II)	Zalaegerszeg
17:00 CET	Amato 52'; B. Kiss 59'; N. Szendrei (yellow card) 90+2'	Report	Pávkovics (yellow card) 26'; Urblík 50' (pen.); R. Horváth (yellow card) 54'; Zimonyi (yellow card) 90'	Stadium: ZTE Arena; Attendance: 2,144; Referee: Gergő Bogár; Assistant referees: Vencel Tóth II, Gábor Máyer
Note: • Zalaegerszeg: Mauricio — Csonka, Peraza, Várkonyi, Calderón — B. Kiss (Daniel (substituted on) 73'), Amato, N. Szendrei (c), Skribek (A. Ferreira (substituted on) 83') — João Victor (López (substituted on) 90+3'), Maxsuell (Bobson (substituted on) 90+3') • Manager: Campos

4 March 2026 QF	Zalaegerszeg	1–0	Soroksár (NB II)	Zalaegerszeg
17:15 CET	Várkonyi (yellow card) 20'; N. Szendrei (yellow card) 66'; Alfonso 86'	Report	Köböl (yellow card) 79'; D. Lukács (yellow card) 88'	Stadium: ZTE Arena; Attendance: 2,109; Referee: Márton Rúsz; Assistant referees: Péter Kóbor, Georgiou Theodoros
Note: • Zalaegerszeg: Mauricio — Harangi, Victory, Várkonyi, Calderón — B. Kiss, Amato, N. Szendrei (c), Skribek (Teixeira (substituted on) 63') — Daniel (Alfonso (substituted on) 55'), Maxsuell (João Victor (substituted on) 55') • Manager: Campos

21 April 2026 SF	Budapest Honvéd (NB II)	2–2 (a.e.t.) (4–5 p)	Zalaegerszeg	Budapest
20:00 CEST	Pekár (yellow card) 7'; Csonka (yellow card) 34'; Pauljević 44'; Csontos (yellow card) 76'; T. Szabó (yellow card) 87'; Szamosi 101'; A. Szabó (yellow card) 110'	Report	López (yellow card) 50'; Calderón (yellow card) 56'; N. Szendrei (yellow card) 74'; João Victor 90+3' (yellow card) 90+3'; Alfonso 92'; Bîtca (yellow card) 107'	Stadium: Bozsik Aréna; Attendance: 5,450; Referee: Bence Csonka dr. Assistant referees: Gergő Vígh-Tarsonyi, Balázs Szalai
	Penalties
	Csontos (penalty scored); Szamosi (penalty scored); A. Szabó (penalty missed); Nyers (penalty scored); Zuigéber (penalty scored)		N. Szendrei (penalty scored); Victory (penalty scored); B. Kiss (penalty scored); Alfonso (penalty scored); Skribek (penalty scored)
Note: • Zalaegerszeg: Mauricio — Calderón (López (substituted on) 119'), Várkonyi (Diogo Silva (substituted on) 119'), Victory, Csonka (Bîtca (substituted on) 73') — B. Kiss, Amato (Daniel (substituted on) 73'), N. Szendrei (c), Skribek — João Victor (Elosú (substituted on) 97'), Maxsuell (Alfonso (substituted on) 79') • Manager: Campos (yellow card) 81'

9 May 2026 F	Ferencváros (NB I)	1–0 (a.e.t.)	Zalaegerszeg	Budapest
18:00 CEST	Szalai (yellow card) 87'; Yusuf (penalty missed) 95'; Raemaekers 111'; Abu Fani (yellow card) 114'	Report	Teixeira (yellow card) 96'; N. Szendrei (yellow card) 100'	Stadium: Puskás Aréna; Attendance: 49,858; Referee: Márton Rúsz; Assistant referees: Balázs Buzás, Gergő Vígh-Tarsonyi
Note: • Zalaegerszeg: Gundel-Takács — Calderón, Várkonyi, Victory, Csonka (López (substituted on) 91') — B. Kiss (Alfonso (substituted on) 110'), Amato, N. Szendrei (c), Skribek — João Victor (Teixeira (substituted on) 90'), Maxsuell (Daniel (substituted on) 63') • Manager: Campos
