= Alex Szabó =

Alex Szabó may refer to:

- Alex Szabó (footballer, born 1998)
- Alex Szabó (footballer, born 2002)
