= 2022–23 Budapest Honvéd FC season =

Budapest Honvéd
2022–23 season
- Chairman: Zoltán Bozó; Dániel Medelényi
- Manager: Tam Courts (until 14 October); Dean Klafurić (from 14 October)
- Nemzeti Bajnokság I: 11th (relegated)
- Magyar Kupa: Round of 16
- Top goalscorer: League: Nenad Lukić (10); All: Nenad Lukić (10)
- Highest home attendance: 7,300 Mezőkövesd (21 May 2023); Nemzeti Bajnokság I
- Lowest home attendance: 980 vs Kisvárda (4 February 2023); Nemzeti Bajnokság I
- Average home league attendance: 3,014
- Biggest win: 2–0 vs Dorog (A) (17 September 2022); Magyar Kupa; 2–0 vs Zalaegerszeg (A) (2 October 2022); Nemzeti Bajnokság I 2–0 vs Vasas (H) (10 November 2022); Nemzeti Bajnokság I 3–1 vs Puskás Akadémia (H) (5 March 2023); Nemzeti Bajnokság I
- Biggest defeat: 0–5 vs Paks (A) (6 November 2022); Nemzeti Bajnokság I
Home colours	Away colours
- All statistics correct as of 19 March 2023.

The 2022–23 season is Budapest Honvéd Football Club's 112th competitive season, 18th consecutive season in the Nemzeti Bajnokság I and 113th year in existence as a football club.In addition to the domestic league, Budapest Honvéd participate in this season's editions of the Magyar Kupa.

== Transfers ==
=== Summer ===
In: Note: Flags indicate national team as defined under FIFA eligibility rules; some limited exceptions apply. Players may hold more than one non-FIFA nationality.

No.	Pos.	Nation	Player
5	MF	SRB	Nikola Mitrović (from Újpest)
9	MF	ISR	Maxim Plakuschenko (from (Israel) Maccabi Haifa)
17	DF	ALB	Albi Doka (from (Croatia) Gorica)
21	FW	CAN	Richie Ennin (loan from (Latvia) Spartaks Jūrmala)
23	DF	ALB	Herdi Prenga (from Kisvárda)
31	DF	SRB	Lazar Ćirković (from Kisvárda)
37	MF	HUN	Bertalan Bocskay (loan return from (Serbia) Bačka Topola)
78	DF	FRA	Christian Gomis (from (Bulgaria) Lokomotiv Plovdiv)
92	FW	HUN	Dominik Kocsis (loan return from Diósgyőr)
—	FW	HUN	Norbert Balogh (loan return from (Slovakia) Dunajská Streda)
—	DF	MDA	Artur Crăciun (loan return from (Bulgaria) Lokomotiv Plovdiv)
—	FW	HUN	Dávid László (loan return from Budafok)
—	FW	HUN	Kristóf Tóth-Gábor (loan return from Szombathelyi Haladás)
—	GK	HUN	András Horváth (loan return from Budafok)
—	DF	HUN	Milán Horváth (loan return from Siófok)
—	MF	FRA	Brandon Domingues (from (France) Troyes)
—	MF	ESP	Jairo Samperio (from (Spain) Málaga)
—	DF	CRO	Luka Capan (from (Turkey) Bursaspor)

Out: Note: Flags indicate national team as defined under FIFA eligibility rules; some limited exceptions apply. Players may hold more than one non-FIFA nationality.

No.	Pos.	Nation	Player
5	DF	ISR	Nir Bardea (to (Israel) Maccabi Bnei Reineh)
6	MF	FRA	Zinédine Machach (loan return to (Italy) Napoli)
8	MF	HUN	Patrik Hidi (to Vasas)
9	FW	SRB	Dejan Dražić (loan return to (Slovakia) Slovan Bratislava)
17	FW	HUN	Norbert Balogh (to (Slovakia) Dunajská Streda)
18	GK	HUN	András Horváth (to Budafok)
19	DF	ALB	Albi Doka (loan return to (Croatia) Gorica)
21	MF	HUN	Lukács Bőle (to Paks)
23	MF	HUN	Bence Banó-Szabó (to Kecskemét)
30	DF	ALB	Naser Aliji (to (Romania) Voluntari)
34	FW	BRB	Thierry Gale (to (Georgia (country)) Dila Gori)
35	MF	SRB	Dušan Pantelić (to (Bosnia and Herzegovina) Tuzla City)
36	MF	HUN	Botond Baráth (to Vasas)
42	MF	GHA	Mohammed Kadiri (loan return to (Ukraine) Dynamo Kyiv)
47	MF	UKR	Oleksandr Petrusenko (to (Croatia) Istra)
70	MF	HUN	Milán Májer (to Zalaegerszeg)
77	MF	HUN	Gergő Nagy (to Mezőkövesd)
82	FW	HUN	Dávid László (loan to Szentlőrinc)
99	FW	HUN	Kristóf Tóth-Gábor (to Pécs)
—	DF	MDA	Artur Crăciun (to (Israel) Hapoel Kfar Saba)
—	DF	HUN	Milán Horváth (loan to Mezőkövesd)

=== Winter ===
In: Note: Flags indicate national team as defined under FIFA eligibility rules; some limited exceptions apply. Players may hold more than one non-FIFA nationality.

No.	Pos.	Nation	Player
—	DF	HUN	Barna Benczenleitner (from Budapest Honvéd II)
—	FW	UKR	Maksym Pukhtyeyev (from Budapest Honvéd II)
—	DF	HUN	Milán Horváth (loan return from Mezőkövesd)

Out: Note: Flags indicate national team as defined under FIFA eligibility rules; some limited exceptions apply. Players may hold more than one non-FIFA nationality.

No.	Pos.	Nation	Player
14	LW	HUN	Dominik Nagy (to Mezőkövesd)
19	FW	MLI	Boubacar Traoré (to (Tunisia) Monastir)
—	DF	HUN	Milán Horváth (loan to Siófok)
—	FW	UKR	Maksym Pukhtyeyev (loan to Mosonmagyaróvár)

== Pre–season and friendlies ==
Win Draw Loss Fixtures

6 July 2022 Friendly	Nafta Lendava (Slovenia)	0–4	Budapest Honvéd	Lendava, Slovenia
18:00 CEST		Report	Traoré 33', 42', 44'; Jónsson 85'	Stadium: Lendava Sports Park; Attendance: 0 Referee: Purger

9 July 2022 Friendly	Budapest Honvéd	0–1	(Croatia) Varaždin	Lendava, Slovenia
17:30 CEST		Report	Elezi 71'	Stadium: Lendava Sports Park; Attendance: 0 Referee: Purger

13 July 2022 Friendly	Budapest Honvéd	2–2	(Montenegro) Arsenal Tivat	Gorišnica, Slovenia
17:30 CEST	Traoré 28'; Kocsis 79'	Report	Došljak 11'; Montenegro 39'

16 July 2022 Friendly	Rudar Velenje (Slovenia)	0–3	Budapest Honvéd	Radenci, Slovenia
17:35 CEST		Report	Jónsson 37'; Zsótér 56'; Klemenz 90+6'	Attendance: 0 Referee: Matej Kapun

22 July 2022 Friendly	Budapest Honvéd	1–0	(Hungary) Győri ETO	Budapest, Hungary
17:30 CEST	Prenga 75'	Report		Stadium: Bozsik Aréna; Attendance: 1,000; Referee: Péter Kovács

23 July 2022 Friendly	Budapest Honvéd	3–1	(Hungary) Budapest Honvéd II	Budapest, Hungary
17:30 CEST	Eördögh 31'; Traoré 36'; Jónsson 61'	Report	Szabó 25'	Stadium: Bozsik Aréna

== Competitions ==
=== Overview ===
Competition	First match	Last match	Starting round	Final position	Record							
Competition	First match	Last match	Starting round	Final position	Pld	W	D	L	GF	GA	GD	Win %
Nemzeti Bajnokság I	29 July 2022	27 May 2023	Matchday 1	11th	33	8	9	16	34	51	−17	24.24
Magyar Kupa	17 September 2022	7 February 2023	Round of 64	Round of 16	3	2	0	1	4	3	+1	66.67
Total					36	10	9	17	38	54	−16	27.78

Source: Competitions

=== Nemzeti Bajnokság I ===
==== League table ====
Pos	Team	Pld	W	D	L	GF	GA	GD	Pts	Qualification or relegation
8	Újpest	33	11	8	14	42	55	−13	41	
9	Zalaegerszeg	33	10	9	14	37	43	−6	39	Qualification for the Europa Conference League second qualifying round (Note: Zalaegerszeg qualified to the Europa Conference League second qualifying round as winners of the 2022–23 Magyar Kupa.)
10	Fehérvár	33	8	11	14	38	43	−5	35	
11	Budapest Honvéd (R)	33	8	9	16	34	51	−17	33	Relegation to the Nemzeti Bajnokság II
12	Vasas (R)	33	4	14	15	29	43	−14	26	Relegation to the Nemzeti Bajnokság II

Source: Hungarian Football Federation (in Hungarian), Soccerway
Rules for classification: 1) Points; 2) Matches won; 3) Goal difference; 4) Goals scored; 5) Head-to-head points; 6) Head-to-head goal difference; 7) Fair play ranking; 8) Drawing of lots.
(R) Relegated

==== Results summary ====
Overall								Home						Away					
Pld	W	D	L	GF	GA	GD	Pts	W	D	L	GF	GA	GD	W	D	L	GF	GA	GD
33	8	9	16	34	51	−17	33	4	5	7	18	20	−2	4	4	9	16	31	−15

Source: Soccerway

==== Results by round ====
Round	1	2	3	4	5	6	7	8	9	10	11	12	13	14	15	16	17	18	19	20	21	22	23	24	25	26	27	28	29	30	31	32	33
Ground	H	A	H	A	A	H	A	H	A	H	A	A	H	A	H	H	A	H	A	H	A	H	H	A	H	A	A	H	A	H	A	H	A
Result	L	L	D	W	L	D	W	D	L	D	L	W	L	L	W	L	L	D	D	L	D	W	W	L	L	W	L	L	D	W	D	L	L
Position	10	12	12	9	9	10	7	8	10	10	10	8	9	11	11	11	11	11	11	11	11	11	10	11	11	11	11	11	11	10	10	11	11

Source: Matches
A = Away; H = Home; W = Win; D = Draw; L = Loss

==== Matches ====
29 July 2022 1	Budapest Honvéd	0–1	Zalaegerszeg	Budapest
20:00 CEST (UTC+2)		Report	Ubochioma 47'	Stadium: Bozsik Aréna; Attendance: 4,084; Referee: Gergő Bogár

7 August 2022 2	Fehérvár	4–0	Budapest Honvéd	Székesfehérvár
20:00 CEST (UTC+2)	Dárdai 30'; Kodro 34'; Bamgboye 72'; Zivzivadze 83'	Report		Stadium: MOL Aréna Sóstó; Attendance: 3,517; Referee: István Vad

14 August 2022 3	Budapest Honvéd	3–3	Paks	Budapest
20:00 CEST (UTC+2)	Lukić 14' (pen.), 20' (pen.); Kerezsi 73'; Plakuschenko (red card) 75'	Report	Varga 54', 57', 90+6' (pen.)	Stadium: Bozsik Aréna; Attendance: 2,545; Referee: Ferenc Karakó

21 August 2022 4	Vasas	1–2	Budapest Honvéd	Budapest
20:00 CEST (UTC+2)	Hidi 11'	Report	Ennin 33'; Lukić 65'	Stadium: Illovszky Rudolf Stadion; Attendance: 2,966; Referee: Tamás Bognár

28 August 2022 5	Ferencváros	3–1	Budapest Honvéd	Budapest
17:30 CEST (UTC+2)	Traoré 41', 51', 54'; Vécsei (red card) 70'	Report	Prenga 90+7'	Stadium: Groupama Arena; Attendance: 10,213; Referee: Csaba Pintér

1 September 2022 6	Budapest Honvéd	0–0	Újpest	Budapest
19:00 CEST (UTC+2)		Report		Stadium: Bozsik Aréna; Attendance: 4,085; Referee: Balázs Berke

4 September 2022 7	Kisvárda	0–1	Budapest Honvéd	Kisvárda
14:45 CEST (UTC+2)		Report	Lukić 34' (pen.)	Stadium: Várkerti Stadion; Attendance: 2,452; Referee: Sándor Andó-Szabó

10 September 2022 8	Budapest Honvéd	0–0	Kecskemét	Budapest
17:45 CEST (UTC+2)		Report		Stadium: Bozsik Aréna; Attendance: 3,446; Referee: Mihály Káprály

1 October 2022 9	Debrecen	4–3	Budapest Honvéd	Debrecen
17:00 CEST (UTC+2)	Babunski 15'; Baráth 26'; Bódi 33'; Lagator 48'	Report	Domingues 53'; Samperio 70' (pen.); Jónsson 72'; Gomis (red card) 90+2'	Stadium: Nagyerdei Stadion; Attendance: 4,512; Referee: József Erdős

8 October 2022 10	Budapest Honvéd	2–2	Mezőkövesd	Budapest
19:30 CEST (UTC+2)	Samperio 16'; Ennin 24'	Report	Dražić 2', 36'	Stadium: Bozsik Aréna; Attendance: 3,646; Referee: Ferenc Karakó

15 October 2022 11	Puskás Akadémia	1–0	Budapest Honvéd	Felcsút
17:00 CEST (UTC+2)	Batik 38'	Report	Bocskay (red card) 74'	Stadium: Pancho Aréna; Attendance: 1,828; Referee: Márton Rúsz

22 October 2022 12	Zalaegerszeg	0–2	Budapest Honvéd	Zalaegerszeg
13:30 CEST (UTC+2)		Report	Samperio 44', 53'	Stadium: ZTE Arena; Attendance: 2,216; Referee: Tamás Bognár

29 October 2022 13	Budapest Honvéd	0–1	Fehérvár	Budapest
14:15 CEST (UTC+2)		Report	Kodro 13'	Stadium: Bozsik Aréna; Attendance: 3,407; Referee: József Erdős

6 November 2022 14	Paks	5–0	Budapest Honvéd	Paks
18:00 CET (UTC+1)	Papp 18'; Szélpál 40'; B. Szabó 52'; Varga 55', 66'	Report		Stadium: Fehérvári úti Stadion; Attendance: 1,711; Referee: Balázs Berke

10 November 2022 15	Budapest Honvéd	2–0	Vasas	Budapest
19:00 CET (UTC+1)	Lukić 84', 88'	Report		Stadium: Bozsik Aréna; Attendance: 2,389; Referee: Ferenc Karakó

13 November 2022 16	Budapest Honvéd	0–2	Ferencváros	Budapest
15:45 CET (UTC+1)		Report	Traoré 52'; Auzqui 90+4'	Stadium: Bozsik Aréna; Attendance: 4,938; Referee: Ádám Farkas

29 January 2023 17	Újpest	2–1	Budapest Honvéd	Budapest
15:30 CET (UTC+1)	Kastrati 61'; Antonov 76' (pen.)	Report	Lukić 30' (pen.)	Stadium: Szusza Ferenc Stadion; Attendance: 4,044; Referee: Ferenc Karakó

4 February 2023 18	Budapest Honvéd	1–1	Kisvárda	Budapest
17:00 CET (UTC+1)	Lukić 48'	Report	Ilievski 74'	Stadium: Bozsik Aréna; Attendance: 980; Referee: Péter Antal

11 February 2023 19	Kecskemét	2–2	Budapest Honvéd	Kecskemét
14:30 CET (UTC+1)	Katona 16'; Szuhodovszki 45'	Report	Domingues 19', 25'	Stadium: Széktói Stadion; Attendance: 2,527; Referee: Mihály Káprály

19 February 2023 20	Budapest Honvéd	2–3	Debrecen	Budapest
17:30 CET (UTC+1)	Domingues 48'; Lukić 55'	Report	Babunski 27', 72'; Mance 86'	Stadium: Bozsik Aréna; Attendance: 4,938; Referee: Tamás Bognár

24 February 2023 21	Mezőkövesd	0–0	Budapest Honvéd	Mezőkövesd
20:00 CET (UTC+1)		Report		Stadium: Városi Stadion; Attendance: 2,105; Referee: Csaba Pintér

5 March 2023 22	Budapest Honvéd	3–1	Puskás Akadémia	Budapest
15:00 CET (UTC+1)	Prenga 57', 67'; Lukić 81'; Doka (red card) 85'	Report	Favorov 47'	Stadium: Bozsik Aréna; Attendance: 3,656; Referee: Gergő Bogár

11 March 2023 23	Budapest Honvéd	1–0	Zalaegerszeg	Budapest
19:30 CET (UTC+1)	Kocsis 39'	Report		Stadium: Bozsik Aréna; Attendance: 3,000; Referee: József Erdős

18 March 2023 24	Fehérvár	2–0	Budapest Honvéd	Székesfehérvár
19:45 CET (UTC+1)	Katona 34'; Kodro 90' (pen.)	Report		Stadium: MOL Aréna Sóstó; Attendance: 3,683; Referee: Ferenc Karakó

1 April 2023 25	Budapest Honvéd	1–2	Paks	Budapest
19:30 CEST (UTC+2)	Prenga (yellow card) 43'; Lovrić (yellow card) 45'; Lukić 49'	Report	J. Szabó (yellow card) 13'; Hahn 18'; Haraszti (yellow card) 45'; Vas (yellow card) 45+1'; Varga (yellow card) 62'; Szélpál (yellow card) 64'; Böde 85'	Stadium: Bozsik Aréna; Attendance: 3,879; Referee: Ádám Farkas

9 April 2023 26	Vasas	0–1	Budapest Honvéd	Budapest
14:15 CEST (UTC+2)	Otigba (yellow card) 16'; Iyinbor (yellow card) 75'; Holender (yellow card) 77'; Balogh (yellow card) 90+1'	Report	Lovrić (yellow card) 37'; Lukić 85'	Stadium: Illovszky Rudolf Stadion; Attendance: 1,984; Referee: Balázs Berke

15 April 2023 27	Ferencváros	3–0	Budapest Honvéd	Budapest
19:30 CEST (UTC+2)	Mmaee 42'; Marquinhos 72'; Kwabena 87'; Gojak (yellow card) 90+2'	Report	Szabó (yellow card) 51'; Gomis (yellow card) 51'	Stadium: Groupama Arena; Attendance: 11,793; Referee: Csaba Pintér

21 April 2023 28	Budapest Honvéd	0–1	Újpest	Budapest
20:00 CEST (UTC+2)	Lovrić (yellow card) 60'; Benczenleitner (yellow card) 77'; Lukić (yellow card) 85'	Report	Hall (yellow card) 25'; Gouré 89'; Mack (yellow card) 90'	Stadium: Bozsik Aréna; Attendance: 6,284; Referee: Balázs Berke

29 April 2023 29	Kisvárda	2–2	Budapest Honvéd	Kisvárda
17:00 CEST (UTC+2)	Mešanović 28', 65'	Report	Gomis (yellow card) 22'; Lukić 32', (yellow card) 76'; Kerezsi 82'; Mitrović (yellow card) 89'	Stadium: Várkerti Stadion; Attendance: 2,420; Referee: Bence Csonka

5 May 2023 30	Budapest Honvéd	1–0	Kecskemét	Budapest
18:30 CEST (UTC+2)	Eördögh (yellow card) 18'; Kerezsi (yellow card) 36', (goal) 55'; Klemenz (yellow card) 66'; Doka (yellow card) 87'	Report	Májer (yellow card) 32'; Szalai (yellow card) 36'; Nikitscher (yellow card) 44'	Stadium: Bozsik Aréna; Attendance: 5,003; Referee: Tamás Bognár
Note: Klafurić (yellow card) 81'

13 May 2023 31	Debrecen	0–0	Budapest Honvéd	Debrecen
17:00 CEST (UTC+2)	Lagator (yellow card) 90+1'; Mance (yellow card) 90+2'	Report	Zsótér (yellow card) 15'	Stadium: Nagyerdei Stadion; Attendance: 5,632; Referee: Gergő Bogár

21 May 2023 32	Budapest Honvéd	2–3	Mezőkövesd	Bozsik Aréna
14:10 CEST (UTC+2)	Kerezsi 45+1'; Kocsis 71'	Report	Vayda (yellow card) 27'; Dražić 35' (pen.); Beširović 54', 81'; Piscitelli (yellow card) 90'	Stadium: Budapest; Attendance: 7,300; Referee: Balázs Berke

27 May 2023 33	Puskás Akadémia	2–1	Budapest Honvéd	Felcsút
20:00 CEST (UTC+2)	Colley (yellow card) 6'; Plšek (yellow card) 34'; Stronati (yellow card) 51'; Slagveer 87'; Favorov 90+4'; Szolnoki (yellow card) 90+5'	Report	Szabó (yellow card) 64'; Zsótér (yellow card) 87', (goal) 89'; Klemenz (yellow card) 88'; Klafurić (not on pitch) (yellow card) 89'; Domingues (red card) 90+2'	Stadium: Pancho Aréna; Attendance: 2,512; Referee: István Vad

=== Magyar Kupa ===
17 September 2022 Round of 64	Dorog	0–2	Budapest Honvéd	Dorog
13:30 CEST (UTC+2)		Report	Mitrović 3'; Samperio 15'	Stadium: Buzánszky Jenő Stadion; Attendance: 1,000; Referee: Ádám Pillók

19 October 2022 Round of 32	Szombathelyi Haladás	1–2	Budapest Honvéd	Szombathely
17:00 CEST (UTC+2)	Nyíri 41'	Report	Kocsis 11'; Kerezsi 14'; Klemenz (red card) 69'	Stadium: Haladás Sportkomplexum; Attendance: 1,617; Referee: Zoltán J. Kovács

7 February 2023 Round of 16	Vasas	2–0	Budapest Honvéd	Budapest
19:00 CET (UTC+1)	Zimonyi 22'; Hinora 90+2'	Report	Prenga (yellow card) 22' (yellow-red card) 90+3'	Stadium: Illovszky Rudolf Stadion; Attendance: 1,200; Referee: Sándor Andó-Szabó

== Statistics ==
=== Appearances and goals ===
Last updated on 19 March 2023.

No.	Pos	Nat	Player	Total		Nemzeti Bajnokság I		Magyar Kupa	
No.	Pos	Nat	Player	Apps	Goals	Apps	Goals	Apps	Goals
4	DF	(Poland) POL	Lukas Klemenz	5	0	4	0	1	0
5	MF	(Serbia) SRB	Nikola Mitrović	27	1	24	0	3	1
9	MF	(Israel) ISR	Maxim Plakuschenko	16	0	13	0	3	0
11	MF	(Hungary) HUN	Donát Zsótér	16	0	15	0	1	0
17	DF	(Albania) ALB	Albi Doka	19	0	18	0	1	0
20	GK	(Hungary) HUN	Péter Szappanos	17	-28	17	-28	0	-0
21	FW	(Canada) CAN	Richie Ennin	17	2	15	2	2	0
22	DF	(Hungary) HUN	Krisztián Tamás	23	0	20	0	3	0
23	DF	(Albania) ALB	Herdi Prenga	25	3	22	3	3	0
25	DF	(Croatia) CRO	Ivan Lovrić	13	0	11	0	2	0
27	FW	(Serbia) SRB	Nenad Lukić	24	10	22	10	2	0
28	FW	(Iceland) ISL	Viðar Ari Jónsson	21	1	18	1	3	0
29	MF	(Spain) ESP	Jairo Samperio	17	5	15	4	2	1
30	DF	(Croatia) CRO	Luka Capan	14	0	13	0	1	0
31	DF	(Serbia) SRB	Lazar Ćirković	16	0	16	0	0	0
37	MF	(Hungary) HUN	Bertalan Bocskay	17	0	15	0	2	0
78	DF	(France) FRA	Christian Gomis	21	0	18	0	3	0
82	LW	(Hungary) HUN	Ábel Krajcsovics	3	0	2	0	1	0
83	GK	(Slovakia) SVK	Tomáš Tujvel	7	-9	4	-6	3	-3
84	FW	(Hungary) HUN	Zalán Kerezsi	11	2	9	1	2	1
91	DF	(Hungary) HUN	Alex Szabó	15	0	12	0	3	0
92	FW	(Hungary) HUN	Dominik Kocsis	27	1	24	1	3	0
93	MF	(Hungary) HUN	Noel Keresztes	3	0	3	0	0	0
97	DF	(Hungary) HUN	Barna Benczenleitner	2	0	2	0	0	0
99	MF	(France) FRA	Brandon Domingues	16	4	14	4	2	0
Youth players:
75	MF	(Hungary) HUN	Gergely Kocsis	0	0	0	0	0	0
85	FW	(Hungary) HUN	András Eördögh	1	0	0	0	1	0
88	MF	(Hungary) HUN	István Átrok	6	0	6	0	0	0
89	GK	(Hungary) HUN	Levente Schrankó	0	0	0	-0	0	-0
90	GK	(Hungary) HUN	Márk Gyetván	0	0	0	-0	0	-0
98	GK	(Hungary) HUN	Gellért Dúzs	4	-3	4	-3	0	-0
Out to loan:
94	FW	(Ukraine) UKR	Maksym Pukhtyeyev	1	0	1	0	0	0
Players no longer at the club:
19	FW	(Mali) MLI	Boubacar Traoré	6	0	6	0	0	0

=== Top scorers ===
Includes all competitive matches. The list is sorted by shirt number when total goals are equal.

Last updated on 19 March 2023

Position	Nation	Number	Name	Nemzeti Bajnokság I	Magyar Kupa	Total
1	(Serbia)	27	Nenad Lukić	10	0	10
2	(Spain)	29	Jairo Samperio	4	1	5
3	(France)	99	Brandon Domingues	4	0	4
4	(Albania)	23	Herdi Prenga	3	0	3
5	(Canada)	21	Richie Ennin	2	0	2
5	(Hungary)	84	Zalán Kerezsi	1	1	2
5	(Hungary)	92	Dominik Kocsis	1	1	2
8	(Serbia)	5	Nikola Mitrović	0	1	1
8	(Iceland)	28	Viðar Ari Jónsson	1	0	1
/	/	/	Own Goals	0	0	0
			TOTALS	26	4	30

=== Disciplinary record ===
Includes all competitive matches. Players with 1 card or more included only.

Last updated on 19 March 2023

Position	Nation	Number	Name	Nemzeti Bajnokság I		Magyar Kupa		Total (Hu Total)	
Position	Nation	Number	Name	Yellow card	Red card	Yellow card	Red card	Yellow card	Red card
DF	(Poland)	4	Lukas Klemenz	2	0	0	1	2 (2)	1 (0)
MF	(Serbia)	5	Nikola Mitrović	1	0	0	0	1 (1)	0 (0)
DF	(Israel)	9	Maxim Plakuschenko	1	1	0	0	1 (1)	1 (1)
MF	(Hungary)	11	Donát Zsótér	3	0	0	0	3 (3)	0 (0)
DF	(Hungary)	17	Albi Doka	4	1	0	0	4 (4)	1 (1)
FW	(Mali)	19	Boubacar Traoré	1	0	0	0	1 (1)	0 (0)
FW	(Canada)	21	Richie Ennin	2	0	1	0	3 (2)	0 (0)
DF	(Hungary)	22	Krisztián Tamás	2	0	1	0	3 (2)	0 (0)
DF	(Albania)	23	Herdi Prenga	3	0	0	1	3 (3)	1 (0)
DF	(Croatia)	25	Ivan Lovrić	3	0	1	0	4 (3)	0 (0)
FW	(Serbia)	27	Nenad Lukić	2	0	0	0	2 (2)	0 (0)
MF	(Iceland)	28	Viðar Ari Jónsson	2	0	1	0	3 (2)	0 (0)
DF	(Croatia)	30	Luka Capan	4	0	1	0	5 (4)	0 (0)
DF	(Serbia)	31	Lazar Ćirković	2	0	0	0	2 (2)	0 (0)
MF	(Hungary)	37	Bertalan Bocskay	4	1	0	0	4 (4)	1 (1)
DF	(France)	78	Christian Gomis	6	1	0	0	6 (6)	1 (1)
FW	(Hungary)	82	Ábel Krajcsovics	1	0	0	0	1 (1)	0 (0)
GK	(Slovakia)	83	Tomáš Tujvel	0	0	1	0	1 (0)	0 (0)
FW	(Hungary)	85	András Eördögh	0	0	1	0	1 (0)	0 (0)
DF	(Hungary)	91	Alex Szabó	4	0	1	0	5 (4)	0 (0)
FW	(Hungary)	92	Dominik Kocsis	3	0	0	0	3 (3)	0 (0)
MF	(France)	99	Brandon Domingues	0	0	1	0	1 (0)	0 (0)
			TOTALS	50	4	9	2	59 (50)	6 (4)

=== Clean sheets ===
Position	Nation	Number	Name	Nemzeti Bajnokság I	Magyar Kupa	Total
1	(Hungary)	20	Péter Szappanos	6	0	6
2	(Slovakia)	83	Tomáš Tujvel	2	1	3
3	(Hungary)	98	Gellért Dúzs	3	0	3
4	(Hungary)	89	Levente Schrankó	0	0	0
4	(Hungary)	90	Márk Gyetván	0	0	0
			TOTALS	11	1	12
