= Viktor Petrók =

Viktor Petrók may refer to:

- Viktor Petrók (footballer, born 1981), Hungarian footballer for Kaposvár and Pécs
- Viktor Petrók (footballer, born 2008), Hungarian youth international footballer for Zalaegerszeg
