= Rafael Tavares =

Rafael Tavares may refer to:

- Rafael Tavares (footballer, born 1990), Brazilian football attacking midfielder
- Rafael Tavares (footballer, born 2000), Brazilian football winger and forward
- Rafael Tavares Gomes Fernandes (born 2002), Portuguese football defender
