= 2025 Amazonas Futebol Clube season =

Amazonas
2025 season
- Manager: Eduardo Barros
- Stadium: Estádio Municipal Carlos Zamith
- Campeonato Brasileiro Série B: Pre-season
- Campeonato Amazonense: Champions (2nd title)
- Copa do Brasil: First Round
- Copa Verde: Quarter-finals
- Average home league attendance: 1,965
Home colours	Away colours

The 2025 season is the seventh year in the history of Amazonas Futebol Clube. The club will participate in the Campeonato Brasileiro Série B for the second consecutive season, the Campeonato Amazonense, the Copa do Brasil, and the Copa Verde.

== Players ==
=== Squad ===
As of 2 March 2025

Note: Flags indicate national team as defined under FIFA eligibility rules; some limited exceptions apply. Players may hold more than one non-FIFA nationality.

No.	Pos.	Nation	Player
1	GK	BRA	João Lopes
2	DF	BRA	Rafael Monteiro (on loan from Fluminense)
3	DF	BRA	Thiago Spice
4	DF	BRA	Wellington Nascimento
5	DF	BRA	Luiz Felipe
6	DF	BRA	Fabiano
7	FW	BRA	Gustavo Ermel
8	MF	BRA	Bruno Ramires
9	FW	BRA	Luan Silva
10	MF	BRA	Rafael Tavares
11	FW	BRA	Luquinhas
12	DF	BRA	Raimar
13	MF	COL	Larry Vásquez
14	DF	BRA	Zé Gabriel
15	DF	EQG	Carlos Akapo
17	MF	BRA	Guilherme Xavier
18	MF	BRA	Cocote
19	FW	BRA	William Barbio
20	MF	BRA	Eliton Júnior
21	FW	BRA	Vitão
22	FW	URU	Diego Zabala
23	GK	BRA	Pedro Caracoci
26	MF	BRA	Pará
28	MF	BRA	Yuri

No.	Pos.	Nation	Player
30	DF	BRA	Diogo Carlos
32	GK	BRA	Robson
33	FW	BRA	Wanderson
34	FW	BRA	Will
38	FW	COL	Jonathan Palacios
43	FW	BRA	Pedro Bahia
50	FW	ECU	Jonny Uchuari
57	DF	BRA	Iverton
58	DF	BRA	Thomas Luciano (on loan from Gil Vicente)
71	MF	BRA	Vinicius Belotti
77	MF	BRA	Robertinho
99	FW	BRA	Sassá
—	GK	BRA	Renan
—	DF	BRA	Alyson
—	DF	BRA	Diego Borges (on loan from Santos)
—	DF	BRA	Tiago Cametá
—	MF	BRA	Lucas Maciel
—	MF	ARG	Nicolás Linares
—	MF	BRA	Phillipe Guimarães
—	MF	BRA	Théo Henrique
—	MF	COL	Yaider Mena
—	FW	BRA	Adrien
—	FW	ECU	Bryan Cabezas
—	FW	URU	Kevin Ramírez

== Competitions ==
=== Overall record ===
Competition	First match	Last match	Starting round	Final position	Record							
Competition	First match	Last match	Starting round	Final position	Pld	W	D	L	GF	GA	GD	Win %
Série B	5 April 2025	22 November 2025	Matchday 1		16	3	5	8	13	23	−10	18.75
Campeonato Amazonense	25 January 2025	1 April 2025	First Stage	Winner	12	5	3	4	17	9	+8	41.67
Copa do Brasil	20 February 2025	20 February 2025	First Round	First Round	1	0	1	0	0	0	+0	0.00
Copa Verde	5 February 2025	27 February 2025	Round of 16	Quarter-finals	3	1	1	1	5	3	+2	33.33
Total					32	9	10	13	35	35	+0	28.13

Last updated: 12 May 2025
Source: Competitions

=== Série B ===
==== League table ====
Pos	Team	Pld	W	D	L	GF	GA	GD	Pts	Promotion or relegation
16	Botafogo-SP	38	10	12	16	32	52	−20	42	
17	Ferroviária (R)	38	8	16	14	43	52	−9	40	Relegation to 2026 Campeonato Brasileiro Série C
18	Amazonas (R)	38	8	12	18	38	55	−17	36	Relegation to 2026 Campeonato Brasileiro Série C
19	Volta Redonda (R)	38	8	12	18	26	43	−17	36	Relegation to 2026 Campeonato Brasileiro Série C
20	Paysandu (R)	38	5	13	20	36	52	−16	28	Relegation to 2026 Campeonato Brasileiro Série C

Source: CBF
Rules for classification: 1) points; 2) wins; 3) goal difference; 4) goals scored; 5) head-to-head results (only between 2 teams); 6) fewest red cards; 7) fewest yellow cards; 8) drawing of lots.
(R) Relegated

==== Matches ====
4 April 2025 1	Goiás	1–0	Amazonas	Goiânia
19:00	Rodrigo Andrade 4'	Report		Stadium: Estádio da Serrinha

12 April 2025 2	Amazonas	0–0	Ferroviária	Manaus
19:00		Report		Stadium: Arena da Amazônia

17 April 2025 3	América Mineiro	3–1	Amazonas	Belo Horizonte
21:35	Miqueias 4'; Fabinho 50'; Figueiredo 63'	Report	Ricardo Silva 36' (o.g.)	Stadium: Arena Independência

21 April 2025 4	Amazonas	0–2	Avaí	Manaus
18:00		Report	Alef Manga 7'; João Pedro 45+4'	Stadium: Arena da Amazônia

27 April 2025 5	Amazonas	1–1	Atlético Goianiense	Manaus
16:30	Luan Silva 82' (pen.)	Report	Marcelinho 45+1'	Stadium: Arena da Amazônia

3 May 2025 6	Remo	1–0	Amazonas	Belém
16:00 UTC−3	Pavani 20'	Report		Stadium: Mangueirão

12 May 2025 7	Amazonas	1–1	CRB	Manaus
	Luan Silva 8' (pen.)	Report	Rafinha 90+3'	Stadium: Estádio Municipal Carlos Zamith

19 May 2025 8	Volta Redonda	1–1	Amazonas	Volta Redonda
	Matheus Lucas 90+2'	Report	Luan Silva 25'	Stadium: Estádio Raulino de Oliveira

25 May 2025 9	Amazonas	2–0	Operário Ferroviário	Manaus
	Jackson 51'; Cocote 84'	Report		Stadium: Estádio Municipal Carlos Zamith

27 July 2025 19	Coritiba	1–1	Amazonas

2 August 2025 20	Amazonas	2–2	Goiás

8 August 2025 21	Ferroviária	2–1	Amazonas

15 August 2025 22	Amazonas	2–2	América Mineiro

=== Campeonato Amazonense ===
==== First phase ====
Group Stage

25 January 2025 1	Amazonas	4–0	Sete FC	Presidente Figueiredo
15:30	Gustavo Ermel 48', 76'; Robertinho 84'; Palacios 90+3'	Report		Stadium: Estádio Larissa Coelho da Silva

29 January 2025 2	Parintins	0–2	Amazonas	Presidente Figueiredo
15:30		Report	Eliton Júnior 37'; Silva 42'	Stadium: Estádio Larissa Coelho da Silva

2 February 2025 3	Manaus	2–2	Amazonas	Manaus
15:30	Renan 50'; Jefferson 90+7'	Report	Sassá 43'; Wellington 82'	Stadium: Arena da Amazônia

8 February 2025 4	Amazonas	1–0	Princesa do Solimões	Manaus
15:30	Silva 24'	Report		Stadium: Estádio Municipal Carlos Zamith

Playoffs

24 February 2025 Semi-finals	Amazonas	0–0 (9–8 p)	Manauara	Manaus
20:30		Report		Stadium: Arena da Amazônia; Referee: Ivan da Silva Guimarães Júnior

9 March 2025 Finals	Amazonas	2–2 (6–5 p)	Manaus	Manaus
17:00	Xavier 11'; Carlos Akapo 39'	Report	Renanzinho 13'; Kesley 66'	Stadium: Arena da Amazônia; Referee: Edina Alves

==== Second phase ====
Group Stage

12 March 2025 1	Amazonas	0–1	Nacional AM	Manaus
			Brocador 57'	Stadium: Estádio Municipal Carlos Zamith

15 March 2025 2	Amazonas	0–1	Manauara	Manaus
			Joelson 63'	Stadium: Estádio Municipal Carlos Zamith

18 March 2025 3	São Raimundo	0–3	Amazonas	Manaus
			Tavares 5'; Vitao 26'; Varanda 30'	Stadium: Estádio Ismael Benigno

Playoffs

22 March 2025 Quarter-finals	Parintins	2–1	Amazonas

==== Play-off ====
1 April 2025 Final	Nacional AM	1–2	Amazonas	Manaus
20:00	Vinicius Balotelli 35'		Varanda 12'; Zabala 90+1'	Stadium: Arena da Amazônia; Referee: Rafael Ramos Tourinho

=== Copa do Brasil ===
20 February 2025 First Round	Rio Branco de Venda Nova	0–0 (5–3 p)	Amazonas	Cariacica
20:00		Report		Stadium: Estádio Kleber Andrade; Attendance: 1,804; Referee: José Magno Teixeira do Nascimento (Rio Grande do Norte)

=== Copa Verde ===
5 February 2025 Round of 16	Amazonas	5–1	Tocantinópolis	Manaus
				Stadium: Arena da Amazônia; Attendance: 312

12 February 2025 Quarter-finals 1st leg	São Raimundo	2–0	Amazonas	Manaus
				Stadium: Estádio Canarinho; Attendance: 1,775

27 February 2025 Quarter-finals 2nd leg	Amazonas	0–0 (0–2 agg.)	São Raimundo	Manaus
				Stadium: Arena da Amazônia; Attendance: 321
