= Diego Borges =

Brazilian footballer (born 2004)

Personal information
- Full name: Diego Henrique Borges da Silva
- Date of birth: 15 December 2004 (age 21)
- Place of birth: Agudos, Brazil
- Height: 1.92 m (6 ft 4 in)
- Position: Centre-back

Team information
- Current team: Sporting Kansas City
- Number: 57

Youth career
- 2021: Ferroviária
- 2022–2023: Falcon
- 2023–2025: Santos

Senior career*
Years	Team	Apps	(Gls)
2025	Santos	0	(0)
2025	→ Amazonas (loan)	6	(0)
2025–2026	Zalaegerszeg	6	(0)
2026–	Sporting Kansas City	0	(0)
2026–	Sporting Kansas City II	0	(0)
- * Club domestic league appearances and goals as of 17 March 2026

Diego Henrique Borges da Silva (born 15 December 2004), known as Diego Borges, is a Brazilian footballer who plays as a centre-back for Major League Soccer club Sporting Kansas City.

== Career ==
=== Early career ===
Diego Borges was born in Agudos, São Paulo, and played for the under-17 side of Ferroviária in 2021 before being released due to an injury. He subsequently played for Falcon, before joining the under-20 squad of Santos on 8 March 2023.

=== Santos ===
In January 2024, Diego Borges was included in the list of the main squad for the 2024 Campeonato Paulista. He would feature exclusively for the youth sides in the year, however.

==== Loan to Amazonas ====
Diego Borges joined Amazonas on loan on 26 February 2025. He made his senior debut on 15 March, starting in a 1–0 home loss to Manauara.

=== Zalaegerszeg ===
On 3 September 2025, Diego Borges left the club and joined Hungarian side Zalaegerszeg; the deal was made official ten days later. On his club debut hours after his official announcement, he scored his club's sixth in a 13–0 away routing of Vásárosnamény SE in the Magyar Kupa.

=== Sporting Kansas City ===
On 17 March 2026, Diego Borges moved to Sporting Kansas City of the Major League Soccer on a contract through the 2029–30 season.

== Career statistics ==
As of 13 September 2025.

Club	Season	League			State League		Cup		Continental		Other		Total	
Club	Season	Division	Apps	Goals	Apps	Goals	Apps	Goals	Apps	Goals	Apps	Goals	Apps	Goals
Santos	2025	Série A	0	0	—		—		—		—		0	0
Amazonas (loan)	2025	Série B	5	0	1	0	0	0	—		0	0	6	0
Zalaegerszeg	2025–26	Nemzeti Bajnokság I	6	0	—		1	1	—		—		7	1
Sporting Kansas City	2026	Major League Soccer	0	0	—		0	0	—		—		0	0
Career total			11	0	1	0	1	1	0	0	0	0	13	1
