= Richie Ennin =

Canadian soccer player (born 1998)

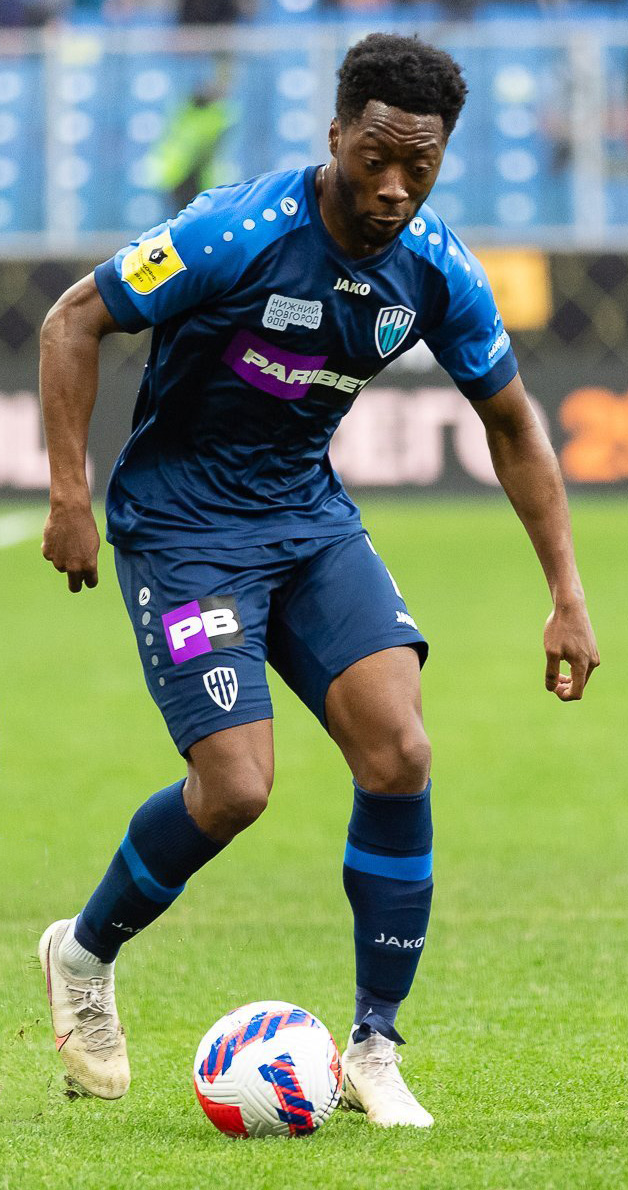
- Ennin with Nizhny Novgorod in 2021

Personal information
- Full name: Richlord Ennin
- Date of birth: September 17, 1998 (age 28)
- Place of birth: Toronto, Ontario, Canada
- Height: 1.83 m (6 ft 0 in)
- Position: Forward

Team information
- Current team: Atlético Ottawa

Youth career
- Brampton East SC
- Toronto FC

Senior career*
Years	Team	Apps	(Gls)
2015–2016	Toronto FC III	34	(13)
2015–2016	Toronto FC II	5	(0)
2017–2018	Isola Capo Rizzuto	18	(0)
2018–2019	Castrovillari	12	(3)
2019–2023	Spartaks Jūrmala	22	(5)
2020	→ Žalgiris (loan)	11	(4)
2020–2021	→ Tom Tomsk (loan)	19	(4)
2021–2022	→ Nizhny Novgorod (loan)	19	(1)
2022–2023	→ Budapest Honvéd (loan)	21	(2)
2023–2024	MTK Budapest	6	(0)
2025–	Atlético Ottawa	1	(1)

International career^{‡}
2015	Canada U17	2	(0)
2017	Canada U20	2	(0)
- * Club domestic league appearances and goals as of September 26, 2025 ‡ National team caps and goals as of January 21, 2017

Richlord Ennin (born September 17, 1998) is a Canadian professional soccer player who plays as a forward for Canadian Premier League club Atlético Ottawa.

== Club career ==
=== Toronto FC ===
In 2015, Ennin played with Toronto FC III in League1 Ontario, scoring 7 goals. In 2016, he appeared for Toronto FC III in both League1 Ontario, scoring five goals in 10 appearances, and the Premier Development League, scoring once in 13 appearances. Ennin made a single appearance for Toronto FC II during the 2015 USL season, having been called up while a prominent figure in the TFC Academy. He made his debut in a 2-0 defeat to Rochester Rhinos on September 24, 2015. Ennin remained with affiliate side Toronto FC II on loan from the Academy for the 2016 USL season.

=== Italy ===
In November 2017, Ennin transferred to Serie D club Isola Capo Rizzuto.

In August 2018, Ennin would transfer to Serie D club Castrovillari.

=== Spartaks Jūrmala ===
In 2019, Ennin joined Latvian Higher League side Spartaks Jūrmala. That season, he made 22 league appearances, scoring five goals and assisting on eight more.

==== Loans ====
On 16 January 2020, Ennin would be loaned to Lithuanian A Lyga side FK Žalgiris.

In October 2020, Ennin would join FNL club FC Tom Tomsk on a subloan from Žalgiris, until the end of 2020. Ennin would be voted by supporters as the club's best player in November and December, and his loan with Tom Tomsk would be extended until June 2021.

In August 2021, Ennin would join Russian Premier League club Nizhny Novgorod on loan for the 2021–22 season. He reunited with Aleksandr Kerzhakov, who was his manager at Tom Tomsk in the previous season. On 23 June 2022, Nizhny Novgorod confirmed that Ennin left the club upon the expiry of his loan.

In July 2022, he joined Budapest Honvéd in the Hungarian Nemzeti Bajnokság I on loan, with an option to purchase.

=== MTK Budapest ===
In November 2023, Ennin signed as a free agent with Hungarian Nemzeti Bajnokság I club MTK Budapest.

== International career ==
Ennin made his international debut while representing Canada at the CONCACAF Under-17 Championship. One of nine Toronto FC Academy players to be included in the squad, the striker first featured in a 1–1 draw with Mexico on March 6, 2015. He made a second appearance three days later during a 3–1 win over Saint Lucia.

== Career statistics ==
As of December 19, 2025

Club	Season	League			Cup		Continental		Other		Total	
Club	Season	Division	Apps	Goals	Apps	Goals	Apps	Goals	Apps	Goals	Apps	Goals
Toronto FC II	2015	USL	1	0	–		–		–		1	0
Toronto FC II	2015	USL	4	0	–		–		–		4	0
Toronto FC II	Total		5	0	0	0	0	0	0	0	5	0
Isola Capo Rizzuto	2017–18	Serie D	18	0	–		–		–		18	0
Castrovillari	2018–19	Serie D	12	3	–		–		2 (Note: Appearances in the Coppa Italia Serie D)	0	14	3
Spartaks Jūrmala	2019	Virslīga	22	5	0	0	–		–		22	5
Žalgiris (loan)	2020	A Lyga	11	4	1	1	1 (Note: Appearance in the UEFA Europa League)	0	1 (Note: Appearance in the Lithuanian Supercup)	0	14	5
Tom Tomsk (loan)	2020–21	FNL	19	4	–		–		–		19	4
Nizhny Novgorod (loan)	2021–22	RPL	19	1	2	0	–		–		21	1
Budapest Honvéd (loan)	2022–23	NB I	18	2	1	0	–		–		19	2
MTK Budapest	2023–24	NB I	6	0	0	0	–		–		6	0
Atlético Ottawa	2025	Canadian Premier League	1	1	0	0	–		1	0	2	1
Career total			131	20	4	1	1	0	4	0	140	21
