= José Manuel Calderón (footballer) =

Spanish footballer (born 2000)

- Calderón with Zalaegerszeg in 2026

Personal information
- Full name: José Manuel Calderón Portillo
- Date of birth: 7 January 2000 (age 26)
- Place of birth: Paradas, Spain
- Height: 1.73 m (5 ft 8 in)
- Position: Left back

Team information
- Current team: Zalaegerszeg
- Number: 18

Youth career
- EB Marchena
- Calavera
- 2017–2019: Betis

Senior career*
Years	Team	Apps	(Gls)
2018–2021	Betis B	56	(6)
2021	Betis	1	(0)
2021–2022	San Fernando	13	(0)
2022–2025	Córdoba	103	(3)
2025–	Zalaegerszeg	20	(3)
- * Club domestic league appearances and goals as of 30 May 2026

José Manuel Calderón Portillo (born 7 January 2000) is a Spanish professional footballer in Nemzeti Bajnokság I club Zalaegerszeg. He plays mainly a left back, he can also play as a left winger.

== Club career ==
Born in Paradas, Seville, Andalusia, Calderón joined Real Betis' youth setup in 2017, after representing Calavera CF and Escuela Base Marchena. He made his senior debut with the reserves on 16 December 2018, starting in a 0–2 Tercera División away loss against Puente Genil FC.

On 3 July 2019, Calderón renewed his contract until 2023. He scored his first senior goals on 15 September 2019, netting a brace for the B's in a 3–1 win at Xerez CD.

Calderón made his first team – and La Liga – debut on 14 August 2021, coming on as a first-half substitute for injured Álex Moreno in a 1–1 away draw against RCD Mallorca. On 4 October, however, he was released by the club due to disciplinary reasons.

On 23 November 2021, Calderón signed for Primera Federación side San Fernando CD. He moved to fellow league team Córdoba CF the following 1 June, and was a first-choice during the 2023–24 season as the club achieved promotion to Segunda División.

On 30 June 2024, Calderón renewed his link with the Blanquiverdes until 2026. On 11 August of the following year, however, he terminated his contract with the club, and agreed to a one-year deal with third division side Gimnàstic de Tarragona the following day; hours later, however, his signing with the latter was cancelled due to a xenophobic commentary on Catalan people in 2019.

On 3 September 2025, Calderón signed with Nemzeti Bajnokság I club Zalaegerszeg.

== Career statistics ==
=== Club ===
As of match played 14 August 2021

Appearances and goals by club, season and competition
Club	Season	League			National Cup		Other		Total	
Club	Season	Division	Apps	Goals	Apps	Goals	Apps	Goals	Apps	Goals
Betis B	2018–19	Tercera División	9	0	—		—		9	0
Betis B	2019–20	Tercera División	20	3	—		2 (Note: Appearance(s) in Promotion Playoffs)	0	22	3
Betis B	2020–21	Segunda División B	24	3	—		—		24	3
Betis B	Total		53	6	0	0	2	0	55	6
Betis	2020–21	La Liga	0	0	0	0	—		0	0
Betis	2021–22	La Liga	1	0	0	0	—		1	0
Betis	Total		1	0	0	0	0	0	1	0
Zalaegerszeg	2025–26	Nemzeti Bajnokság I	0	0	0	0	—		0	0
Career total			54	6	0	0	2	0	56	6
