= João Victor (footballer, born 2004) =

Brazilian footballer

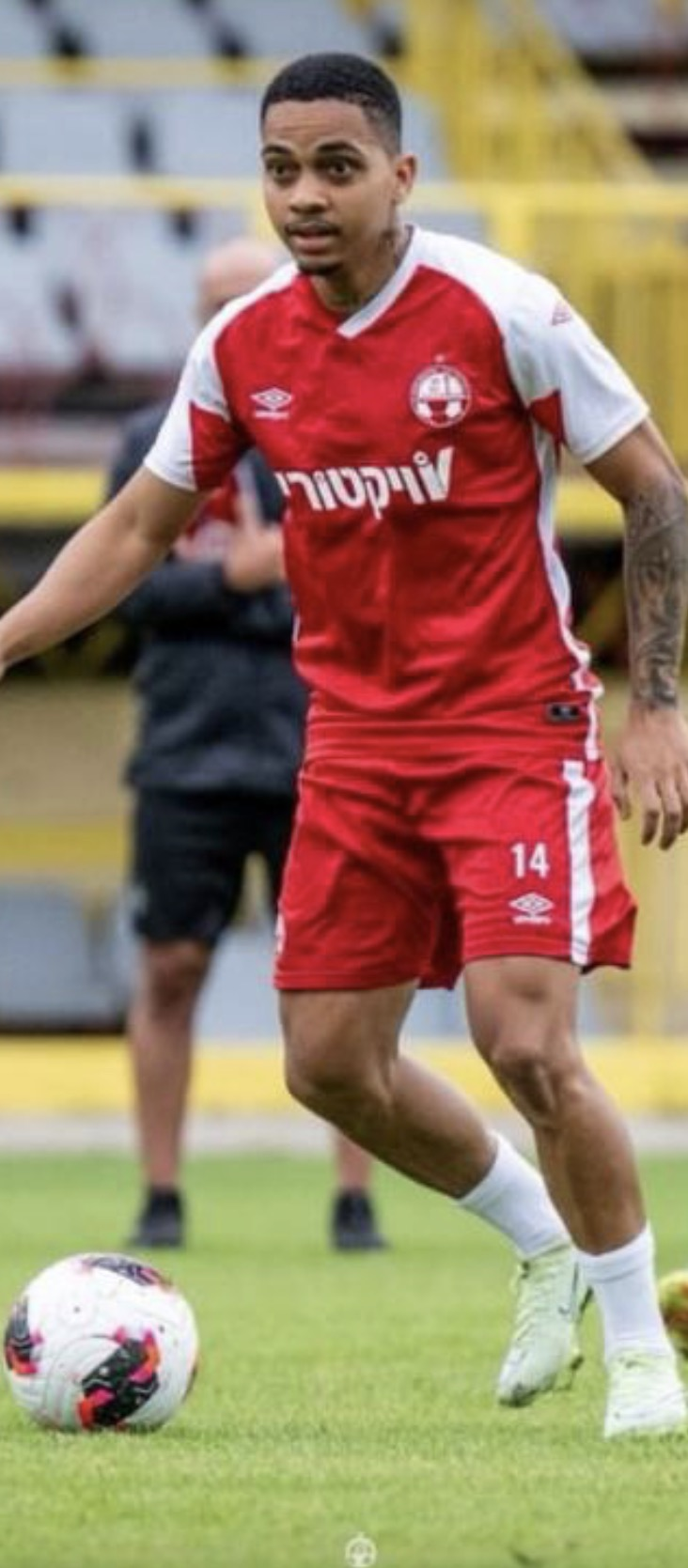

Personal information
- Full name: João Victor Vieira Ferreira Sousa
- Date of birth: 27 April 2004 (age 22)
- Place of birth: São Luís, Brazil
- Height: 1.67 m (5 ft 5 1/2 in)
- Position: Forward

Team information
- Current team: Hapoel Be'er Sheva
- Number: 70

Youth career
- Náutico
- 2018: Comercial-MA
- 2019–2021: Ceará

Senior career*
Years	Team	Apps	(Gls)
2021–2025	Ceará	12	(0)
2023	→ Osaka (loan)	4	(0)
2025–2026	Zalaegerszeg	33	(7)
2026–	Hapoel Be'er Sheva	7	(1)

International career^{‡}
2020	Brazil U17	0	(0)
- * Club domestic league appearances and goals as of 04:00, 7 November 2026 (UTC) ‡ National team caps and goals as of 10:52, 19 October 2026 (UTC)

João Victor Vieira Ferreira Sousa (born 27 March 2004) commonly known as João Victor, is a Brazilian professional footballer who plays as a forward for Israeli Premier League club Hapoel Be'er Sheva.

== Club career ==
=== Ceará ===
Born in São Luís, Maranhão, João Victor finished his formation with Ceará. He made his first team debut at the age of 16 on 10 April 2021, coming on as a late substitute for Stiven Mendoza in a 3–0 home win against Salgueiro, for the year's Copa do Nordeste.

João Victor made his Série A debut on 30 May 2021, replacing Cléber in a 3–2 home success over Grêmio.

On 18 February 2023, João Victor abroad to Japan and announcement officially transfer to J3 newly promoted club, Osaka for ahead of 2023 season on loan.

=== Zalaegerszeg ===
On 17 July 2025, João Victor signed to Nemzeti Bajnokság I club Zalaegerszeg.

=== Hapoel Be'er Sheva ===
On 5 July 2026, Victor signed a four-year contract with Israeli Premier League club Hapoel Be'er Sheva, which paid a €1.7 million transfer fee and agreed to a 20% sell-on clause in favor of his former club.

== International career ==
In November 2020, João Victor was called up to the Brazil U17, but had to withdraw due to an injury.

== Career statistics ==
=== Club ===
As of 8 July 2026.

Club	Season	League			State League		Cup		Continental		Other		Total	
Club	Season	Division	Apps	Goals	Apps	Goals	Apps	Goals	Apps	Goals	Apps	Goals	Apps	Goals
Ceará	2021	Série A	1	0	3	0	1	0	—		1 (Note: Appearance(s) in Copa do Nordeste)	0	6	0
Ceará	2022	Série A	3	0	—		—		—		—		3	0
Ceará	2024	Série B	2	0	0	0	—		—		4 (Note: Two appearances in Copa do Nordeste, two appearances in Copa Fares Lopes)	0	6	0
Ceará	2025	Série A	1	0	2	0	—		—		3	0	6	0
Ceará	Total		7	0	5	0	1	0	—		8	0	21	0
FC Osaka (loan)	2023	J3 League	4	0	—		0	0	—		—		4	0
Zalaegerszeg	2025–26	Nemzeti Bajnokság I	33	7	—		5	2	—		—		38	9
Hapoel Be'er Sheva	2026–27	Israeli Premier League	0	0	—		0	0	0	0	0	0	0	0
Career total			44	7	5	0	6	2	0	0	8	0	63	9

== Honours ==
Ceará

- Campeonato Cearense: 2025
