= Daniel (footballer, born 2004) =

Brazilian footballer

Personal information
- Full name: Daniel Alves de Lima
- Date of birth: 6 December 2004 (age 21)
- Place of birth: Goiânia, Brazil
- Height: 1.86 m (6 ft 1 in)
- Position: Forward

Team information
- Current team: Al-Waab (on loan from Atlético-GO)
- Number: 9

Youth career
- 2019–2021: Vila Nova
- 2021–2024: Atlético-GO

Senior career*
Years	Team	Apps	(Gls)
2022–	Atlético-GO	45	(7)
2024–2025	→ Operário-PR (loan)	30	(3)
2025	→ CRB (loan)	11	(0)
2025–2026	→ Zalaegerszeg (loan)	26	(5)
2026–	→ Al-Waab (loan)	0	(0)
- * Club domestic league appearances and goals as of 30 May 2026

Daniel Alves de Lima (born 6 December 2004), simply known as Daniel, is a Brazilian footballer who plays as a forward for Al-Waab, on loan from Atlético Goianiense.

== Career ==
Born in Goiânia, Goiás, Daniel began his career with Vila Nova before joining the youth sides of Atlético Goianiense in 2021, for a rumoured fee of R$ 250,000. He made his first team debut with the latter on 30 January 2022, coming on as a late substitute for Brian Montenegro in a 1–0 Campeonato Goiano away win over Iporá.

Shortly after making his first team debut, Daniel suffered a knee injury, which sidelined him for the remainder of the year. After recovering, he scored his first senior goal on 12 February 2023, netting Dragão's second in a 3–1 away win over Inhumas.

On 15 April 2023, Daniel renewed his contract with Atlético until 2028. He was mainly a backup option during the 2023 Série B, contributing with one goal as his side achieved promotion.

== Career statistics ==
As of 15 February 2024

Club	Season	League			State League		Cup		Continental		Other		Total	
Club	Season	Division	Apps	Goals	Apps	Goals	Apps	Goals	Apps	Goals	Apps	Goals	Apps	Goals
Atlético Goianiense	2022	Série A	0	0	1	0	0	0	—		—		1	0
Atlético Goianiense	2023	Série B	14	1	8	4	1	0	—		—		23	5
Atlético Goianiense	2024	Série A	0	0	7	2	0	0	—		—		7	2
Zalaegerszeg	2025–26	Nemzeti Bajnokság I	0	0	—		0	0	—		—		0	0
Career total			14	1	16	6	1	0	0	0	0	0	31	7

== Honours ==
Atlético Goianiense

- Campeonato Goiano: 2022, 2023
