= Norbert Szendrei =

Hungarian footballer (born 2000)

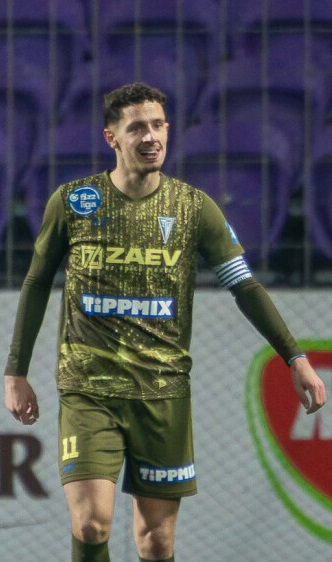
- Szendrei playing for Zalaegerszeg in 2025

Personal information
- Date of birth: 27 March 2000 (age 26)
- Place of birth: Nyíregyháza, Hungary
- Height: 1.83 m (6 ft 0 in)
- Position: Midfielder

Team information
- Current team: Zalaegerszeg
- Number: 11

Youth career
- 2009–2012: Nyíregyháza
- 2012–2018: Budapest Honvéd

Senior career*
Years	Team	Apps	(Gls)
2018–2021	Budapest Honvéd	41	(3)
2021–2022	Fehérvár	17	(0)
2022–	Zalaegerszeg	111	(4)

International career
2016–2017	Hungary U17	11	(1)
2017–2018	Hungary U18	14	(7)
2018–2020	Hungary U19	10	(1)
2020–2022	Hungary U21	12	(1)
- * Club domestic league appearances and goals as of 30 May 2026

Norbert Szendrei (born 27 March 2000) is a Hungarian professional footballer who plays as a midfielder for and captains Nemzeti Bajnokság I club Zalaegerszeg.

== Career ==
=== Honvéd ===
On 27 May 2018, Szendrei played his first match for Budapest Honvéd in a 2–0 loss against Videoton in the Nemzeti Bajnokság I.

=== Fehérvár ===
On 19 July 2021, after 10 years at Budapest Honvéd, Szendrei was transferred to Fehérvár.

=== Zalaegerszeg ===
On 1 July 2022, Szendrei joined Zalaegerszeg on a four-year contract.

== Career statistics ==
As of 15 May 2022

Appearances and goals by club, season and competition
Club	Season	League			Magyar Kupa		Europe		Total	
Club	Season	Division	Apps	Goals	Apps	Goals	Apps	Goals	Apps	Goals
Budapest Honvéd	2017–18	Nemzeti Bajnokság I	1	0	0	0	—		1	0
Budapest Honvéd	2018–19	Nemzeti Bajnokság I	6	0	2	0	0	0	8	0
Budapest Honvéd	2019–20	Nemzeti Bajnokság I	8	1	2	0	0	0	10	1
Budapest Honvéd	2020–21	Nemzeti Bajnokság I	26	2	3	0	1 (Note: Appearance in UEFA Europa League)	0	30	2
Budapest Honvéd	Total		41	3	7	0	1	0	49	3
Fehérvár	2021–22	Nemzeti Bajnokság I	17	0	2	0	—		19	0
Career total			58	3	9	0	1	0	68	3

== Honours ==
Honvéd

- Magyar Kupa: 2019–20
