= Joseth Peraza =

Costa Rican association football player (born 2004)

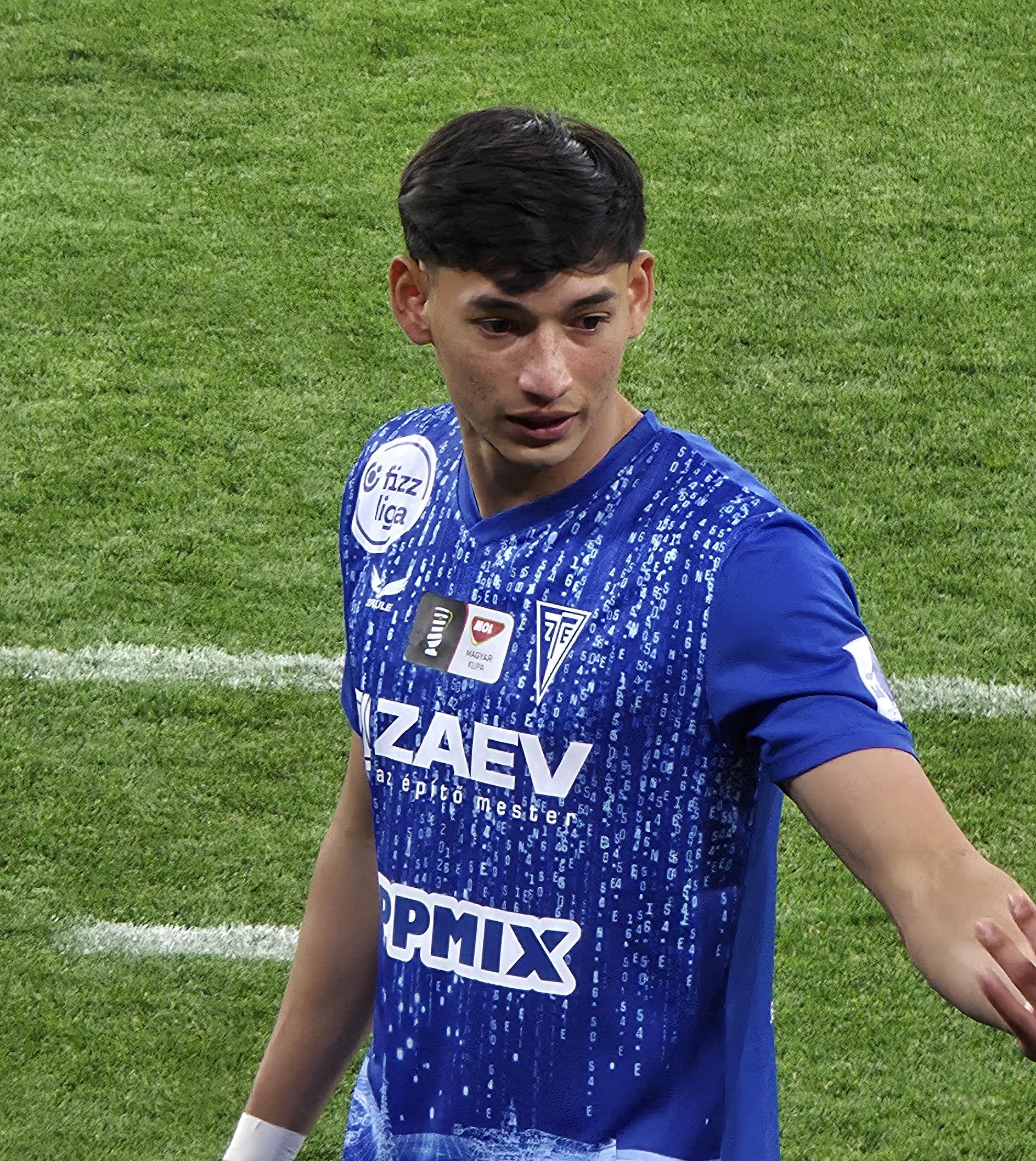
- Peraza playing for Zalaegerszeg in 2026

Personal information
- Full name: Joseth Gael Peraza Serrano
- Date of birth: 9 December 2004 (age 21)
- Place of birth: Heredia, Costa Rica
- Height: 1.88 m (6 ft 2 in)
- Position: Defender

Team information
- Current team: Zalaegerszeg
- Number: 4

Youth career
- –2020: San Carlos

Senior career*
Years	Team	Apps	(Gls)
2020–	San Carlos	75	(4)
2025–	→ Zalaegerszeg (loan)	19	(1)

International career^{‡}
2025-	Costa Rica	1	(0)
- * Club domestic league appearances and goals as of 26 May 2026 (UTC) ‡ National team caps and goals as of 18:00, 2 July 2025 (UTC)

Joseth Gael Peraza Serrano (born 9 December 2004) is a Costa Rican professional footballer who plays as a defender for Hungarian club Zalaegerszeg on loan from Liga FPD club San Carlos and the Costa Rica national team.

== Early life ==
He attended Santa Rosa de La Palmera school in San Carlos where due to his height he was initially encouraged to play as a goalkeeper before developing as a central defender.

== Club career ==
He plays as a central defender for A.D. San Carlos in the Liga FPD, the top division of Costa Rican football. He began training with the first-team where he was 14 years-old and made his top-flight debut in 2020, at just 15 years old three days before his sixteenth birthday.

He was nominated for the best U-21 player of the 2024 Clausura, in which he played 23 of 24 matches. That year, he signed a new three-year contract with the club, into 2027. However, he received a fine and a ban after striking an advertising hoarding during the second leg of the 2024 Clausura National Championship semi-finals away against Deportivo Saprissa.

== International career ==
He represented Costa Rica at youth level football. He was called up to the senior Costa Rica national football team squad but was an unused substitute against the United States in January 2025. He was selected again for the friendly against Catalonia on 28 May 2025.

== Style of play ==
A tall central defender, he is noted for his ariel ability, and whilst not possessing great pace is considered to have the ability to read the game well.
