= Nuno Campos (footballer, born 1975) =

Portuguese football manager and former player (born 1975)

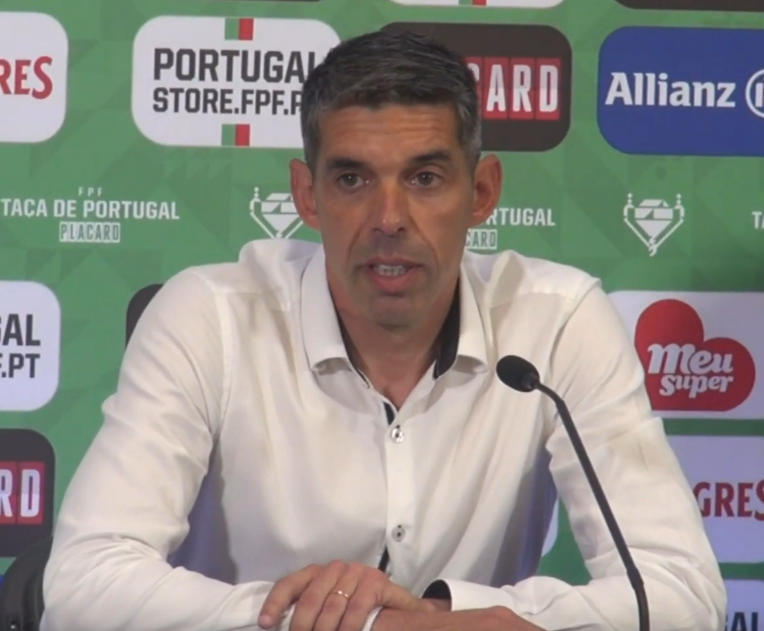
- Campos as manager of Tondela in 2022

Personal information
- Full name: Nuno Alexandre Carvalho Campos
- Date of birth: 20 April 1975 (age 51)
- Place of birth: Lisbon, Portugal
- Height: 1.74 m (5 ft 9 in)
- Positions: Right back; defensive midfielder

Team information
- Current team: Dinamo București (head coach)

Youth career
- 1986–1988: Ginásio Corroios
- 1988–1993: Belenenses

Senior career*
| Years | Team | Apps | (Gls) |
| 1993–1995 | Fanhões | 50 | (9) |
| 1995–1996 | Olivais e Moscavide | 24 | (1) |
| 1996–1997 | Atlético CP | 35 | (4) |
| 1998–1999 | Campomaiorense | 43 | (1) |
| 1999–2001 | Farense | 42 | (0) |
| 2001–2002 | Vitória Setúbal | 2 | (0) |
| 2002–2003 | Farense | 28 | (0) |
| 2003–2004 | União Madeira | 1 | (0) |
| 2004–2005 | Amora | 6 | (0) |
| Total | | 231 | (15) |

Managerial career
- 2005–2007: Estrela Amadora U19 (assistant)
- 2007–2008: 1º Dezembro (assistant)
- 2008–2009: Odivelas (assistant)
- 2009–2011: Pinhalnovense (assistant)
- 2011–2012: Aves (assistant)
- 2012–2013: Paços Ferreira (assistant)
- 2013–2014: Porto (assistant)
- 2014–2015: Paços Ferreira (assistant)
- 2015–2016: Braga (assistant)
- 2016–2019: Shakhtar Donetsk (assistant)
- 2019–2021: Roma (assistant)
- 2021: Santa Clara
- 2022: Tondela
- 2023–2024: Toluca (assistant)
- 2025: Flamengo U20
- 2025–2026: Zalaegerszeg
- 2026–: Dinamo București
- * Club domestic league appearances and goals

Nuno Alexandre Carvalho Campos (born 20 April 1975) is a Portuguese professional football manager and former player who is the head coach of Liga I club Dinamo București.

== Playing career ==
Born in Lisbon, Campos spent several youth years at C.F. Os Belenenses, but began his senior playing career in the third tier before signing for top-flight S.C. Campomaiorense in 1997. He was part of their squad that lost the 1999 Taça de Portugal Final 1–0 to S.C. Beira-Mar.

== Coaching career ==
=== Santa Clara ===
Campos retired in 2005 and took up coaching in 2011. He began as assistant manager to Paulo Fonseca in several countries. He was appointed manager of C.D. Santa Clara on 7 October 2021, replacing Daniel Ramos at the helm for the rest of the season. He made his debut nine days later in a 2–0 win at U.D. Leiria in the third round of the Taça de Portugal. On 23 October, he lost 2–0 at home to F.C. Famalicão in his first league game.

On 15 December 2021, Campos was dismissed. He had won one and drawn one of his six league game, and the team were in 16th.

=== Tondela ===
Campos returned to work in the top flight on 16 March 2022, succeeding Pako Ayestarán at 16th-placed C.D. Tondela. On his debut three days later, the team drew 2–2 at home to F.C. Arouca. On the final day of the season, the team from the Beira conceded two equalisers in a 2–2 draw with Boavista F.C. also at the Estádio João Cardoso, allowing Moreirense F.C. to rise above them outside the relegation zone.

In the 2021–22 Taça de Portugal, Campos led Tondela to their first cup final with a 4–1 aggregate win over C.D. Mafra, though the three goals of the first leg were under his predecessor. There, they lost 3–1 to FC Porto, who completed a double. He was then replaced by Tozé Marreco.

=== Zalaegerszeg ===
On 24 June 2025, Campos signed with Zalaegerszegi TE competing in the Hungarian first league, as head coach.

== Managerial statistics ==
As of match played 21 November 2026

Managerial record by team and tenure
| Team | Nat | From | To | Record | | | | | | | | Ref |
| Team | Nat | From | To | G | W | D | L | GF | GA | GD | Win % | Ref |
|---|---|---|---|---|---|---|---|---|---|---|---|---|
| Santa Clara | (Portugal) | 11 October 2021 | 13 December 2021 | 9 | 3 | 1 | 5 | 11 | 21 | −10 | 33.33 | |
| Tondela | (Portugal) | 16 March 2022 | 30 June 2022 | 10 | 1 | 5 | 4 | 12 | 19 | −7 | 10.00 | |
| Zalaegerszeg | (Hungary) | 24 June 2025 | 7 June 2026 | 39 | 17 | 10 | 12 | 70 | 48 | +22 | 43.59 | |
| Dinamo Bucuresti | (Romania) | 7 June 2026 | present | 18 | 12 | 3 | 3 | 41 | 15 | +26 | 66.67 | |
| Total | | | | 76 | 33 | 19 | 24 | 134 | 103 | +31 | 43.42 | — |

== Honours ==
=== Player ===
Campomaiorense

- Taça de Portugal runner-up: 1998–99

=== Coach ===
Tondela

- Taça de Portugal runner-up: 2021–22

Zalaegerszeg

- Magyar Kupa runner-up: 2025–26

Individual

- Nemzeti Bajnokság I Coach of the Month: November 2025
