= Rafael Tavares (footballer, born 1990) =

Brazilian footballer (born 1990)

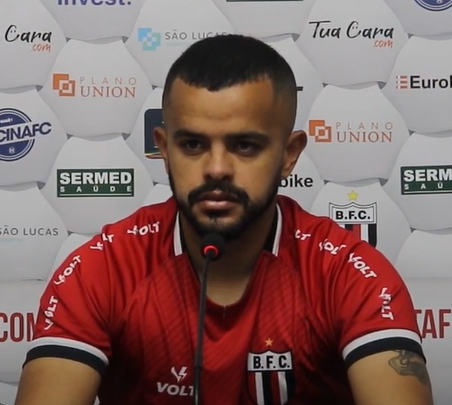
- Tavares in 2021

Personal information
- Full name: Rafael Aparecido de Paulo Tavares
- Date of birth: 27 December 1990 (age 35)
- Place of birth: São Manuel, Brazil
- Height: 1.75 m (5 ft 9 in)
- Position: Attacking midfielder

Team information
- Current team: Amazonas
- Number: 10

Youth career
- São Paulo

Senior career*
Years	Team	Apps	(Gls)
2010–2011	São Paulo	0	(0)
2010	→ Sertãozinho (loan)	1	(0)
2010	→ Marília (loan)	12	(2)
2011–2013	Luverdense	66	(14)
2014	Goiás	0	(0)
2014	→ Aparecidense (loan)	9	(0)
2014	→ Paysandu (loan)	10	(0)
2014	América de Natal	1	(0)
2015	Luverdense	29	(2)
2016	Avenida	18	(2)
2017	Rio Branco-PR	12	(0)
2017	ASA	10	(0)
2017	Linense	0	(0)
2018	Rio Claro	12	(0)
2018	→ Linense (loan)	11	(1)
2019–2021	São José-RS	64	(9)
2020–2021	→ Mirassol (loan)	9	(1)
2021–2022	Botafogo-SP	23	(1)
2022–	Amazonas	124	(25)
- * Club domestic league appearances and goals as of 18 December 2025

Rafael Aparecido de Paulo Tavares (born 27 December 1990) is a Brazilian footballer who plays as an attacking midfielder for Amazonas.

== Career ==
Tavares was born in São Manuel, São Paulo, and was a São Paulo FC youth graduate. He served loan stints at Sertãozinho and Marília in the 2010 season, before being presented at Luverdense for the 2011 Série C in May of that year.

After being a regular starter for LEC, Tavares signed for Goiás and was immediately loaned to Aparecidense in December 2013. On 24 April 2014, he was loaned out to Paysandu.

On 25 September 2014, Tavares was announced at América de Natal, but featured only once and returned to Luverdense on 6 December. In the following three seasons, he represented Avenida, Rio Branco-PR, ASA, Linense (two stints) and Rio Claro.

On 10 December 2018, Tavares was announced at São José-RS. Regularly used by the club, he moved on loan to Mirassol on 4 December 2020, and helped the side to win the 2020 Série D before leaving on 24 February 2021.

On 10 May 2021, Tavares was presented at Botafogo-SP. On 12 April 2022, he agreed to a deal with Amazonas, and was the top goalscorer in the year's Série D as they achieved promotion.

On 27 December 2023, after establishing himself as the top goalscorer of Amazonas' history and achieving a second consecutive promotion, Tavares renewed his contract with the club.

== Career statistics ==
As of 23 February 2024.

Club	Season	League			State League		Cup		Continental		Other		Total	
Club	Season	Division	Apps	Goals	Apps	Goals	Apps	Goals	Apps	Goals	Apps	Goals	Apps	Goals
Sertãozinho (loan)	2010	Paulista	—		1	0	—		—		—		1	0
Marília (loan)	2010	Série C	8	0	4	2	—		—		—		12	2
Luverdense	2011	Série C	6	3	—		—		—		—		6	3
Luverdense	2012	Série C	16	2	11	1	1	0	—		—		28	3
Luverdense	2013	Série C	16	6	17	2	8	1	—		—		41	9
Luverdense	Total		38	11	28	3	9	1	—		—		75	15
Aparecidense	2014	Goiano	—		9	0	—		—		—		9	0
Paysandu	2014	Série C	10	0	—		3	0	—		—		13	0
América de Natal	2014	Série B	1	0	—		—		—		—		1	0
Luverdense	2015	Série B	16	0	13	2	2	0	—		4 (Note: Appearance(s) in Copa Verde)	1	35	3
Avenida	2016	Gaúcho Série A2	—		18	2	—		—		—		18	2
Rio Branco-PR	2017	Paranaense	—		12	0	—		—		—		12	0
ASA	2017	Série C	10	0	—		—		—		—		10	0
Linense	2017	Paulista	—		—		—		—		8 (Note: Appearance(s) in Copa Paulista)	2	8	2
Rio Claro	2018	Paulista A2	—		12	0	—		—		11	1	23	1
Linense (loan)	2018	Série D	11	1	—		—		—		—		11	1
São José	2019	Série C	17	3	12	1	1	0	—		12 (Note: Appearance(s) in Copa FGF)	2	42	6
São José	2020	Série C	16	3	10	0	4	0	—		1	1	31	4
São José	2021	Série C	0	0	9	2	—		—		—		9	2
São José	Total		33	6	31	3	5	0	—		13	3	82	12
Mirassol (loan)	2020	Série D	9	1	—		—		—		—		9	1
Botafogo-SP	2021	Série C	14	1	—		—		—		12	3	26	4
Botafogo-SP	2022	Série C	0	0	9	0	1	0	—		—		10	0
Botafogo-SP	Total		14	1	9	0	1	0	—		12	3	36	4
Amazonas	2022	Série D	21	11	—		—		—		—		21	11
Amazonas	2023	Série C	21	1	14	7	—		—		—		35	8
Amazonas	2024	Série B	0	0	8	1	0	0	—		—		8	1
Amazonas	Total		42	12	22	8	0	0	—		—		64	20
Career total			192	32	159	20	20	1	0	0	48	10	419	63

== Honours ==
Mirassol

- Campeonato Brasileiro Série D: 2020

Amazonas

- Campeonato Amazonense: 2023
- Campeonato Brasileiro Série C: 2023
