= Viktor Petrók (footballer, born 2008) =

Hungarian footballer

- Petrók with Zalaegerszeg in 2026 as runners-up in the Magyar Kupa

Personal information
- Date of birth: 27 March 2008 (age 18)
- Height: 1.76 m (5 ft 9 in)
- Position: Midfielder

Team information
- Current team: Zalaegerszeg
- Number: 19

Youth career
- 2014–2021: Kaposvár
- 2021–2022: Pécs
- 2022–2025: Honvéd

Senior career*
Years	Team	Apps	(Gls)
2024–2026	Honvéd II	20	(2)
2025–2026	Honvéd	2	(0)
2026–	Zalaegerszeg	2	(0)
2026–	Zalaegerszeg II	11	(0)

International career^{‡}
2024	Hungary U16	6	(0)
2024–2025	Hungary U17	11	(1)
2025	Hungary U18	1	(0)
- * Club domestic league appearances and goals as of 15 November 2026 ‡ National team caps and goals as of 17 September 2025

Viktor Petrók (born 27 March 2008) is a Hungarian professional footballer who plays as a midfielder for Nemzeti Bajnokság I club Zalaegerszeg.

== Career ==
On 16 February 2026, Petrók joined Nemzeti Bajnokság I club Zalaegerszeg.

== Career statistics ==
As of match played 15 November 2026

Appearances and goals by club, season and competition
Club	Season	League			Magyar Kupa		Total	
Club	Season	Division	Apps	Goals	Apps	Goals	Apps	Goals
Honvéd II	2024–25	Nemzeti Bajnokság III	4	0	—		4	0
Honvéd II	2025–26	Nemzeti Bajnokság III	16	2	—		16	2
Honvéd II	Total		20	2	—		20	2
Honvéd	2024–25	Nemzeti Bajnokság II	2	0	—		2	0
Zalaegerszeg	2025–26	Nemzeti Bajnokság I	2	0	0	0	2	0
Zalaegerszeg	2026–27	Nemzeti Bajnokság I	0	0	0	0	0	0
Zalaegerszeg	Total		2	0	0	0	2	0
Zalaegerszeg II	2026–27	Nemzeti Bajnokság III	11	0	—		11	0
Career total			35	2	0	0	35	2

== Honours ==
Zalaegerszeg

- Magyar Kupa runner-up: 2025–26
