= András Csonka (footballer) =

Hungarian footballer (born 2000)

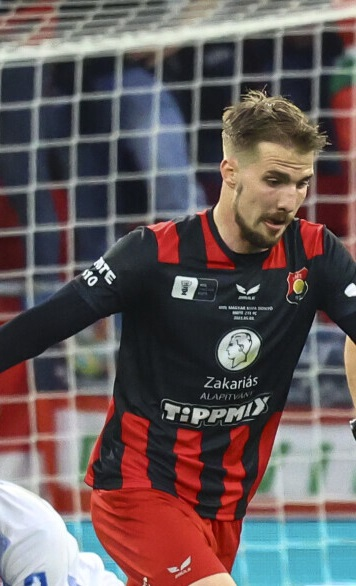
- Csonka playing for Budafok in 2023

Personal information
- Full name: András Mátyás Csonka
- Date of birth: 1 May 2000 (age 26)
- Place of birth: Budapest, Hungary
- Height: 1.78 m (5 ft 10 in)
- Position: Midfielder

Team information
- Current team: Zalaegerszeg
- Number: 8

Youth career
- 2011–2015: Főnix-Gold
- 2015–2017: Ferencváros

Senior career*
Years	Team	Apps	(Gls)
2017–2024	Ferencváros	11	(0)
2019–2020	→ Soroksár (loan)	18	(1)
2021	→ Budafok (loan)	18	(1)
2021	→ Gyirmót (loan)	10	(1)
2022–2024	→ Budafok (loan)	75	(1)
2024–	Zalaegerszeg	51	(1)

International career^{‡}
2015–2016	Hungary U-16	12	(0)
2016–2017	Hungary U-17	21	(0)
2017–2018	Hungary U-18	4	(0)
2018–2019	Hungary U-19	10	(0)
2019–	Hungary U-21	8	(1)
- * Club domestic league appearances and goals as of 30 May 2026 ‡ National team caps and goals as of 8 October 2021

András Mátyás Csonka (born 1 May 2000) is a Hungarian professional footballer who plays as a midfielder for Nemzeti Bajnokság I club Zalaegerszeg.

== Career ==
=== Ferencváros ===
On 20 July 2017, Csonka made his professional debut against FC Midtjylland in 2017–18 UEFA Europa League Second qualifying round.

On 16 June 2020, he became champion with Ferencváros by beating Budapest Honvéd FC at the Hidegkuti Nándor Stadion on the 30th match day of the 2019–20 Nemzeti Bajnokság I season.

== Career statistics ==
Appearances and goals by club, season and competition
Club	Season	League		Cup		Europe		Total	
Club	Season	Apps	Goals	Apps	Goals	Apps	Goals	Apps	Goals
Ferencváros
Ferencváros	2016–17	0	0	1	0	0	0	1	0
Ferencváros	2017–18	1	0	0	0	1	0	2	0
Ferencváros	2018–19	5	0	5	0	0	0	10	0
Ferencváros	2019–20	5	0	2	0	0	0	7	0
Ferencváros	2020–21	0	0	1	0	0	0	1	0
Ferencváros	Total	11	0	9	0	1	0	21	0
Soroksár
Soroksár	2019–20	17	1	0	0	–	–	17	1
Soroksár	Total	17	1	0	0	0	0	17	1
Budafok
Budafok	2020–21	18	1	0	0	–	–	18	1
Budafok	2021–22	13	0	0	0	–	–	13	0
Budafok	Total	31	1	0	0	0	0	31	1
Gyirmót
Gyirmót	2021–22	10	1	2	0	–	–	12	1
Gyirmót	Total	10	1	2	0	0	0	12	1
Career total		69	3	11	0	1	0	81	3

Updated to games played as of 15 May 2022.
