= Bence Gundel-Takács =

Hungarian footballer (born 1998)

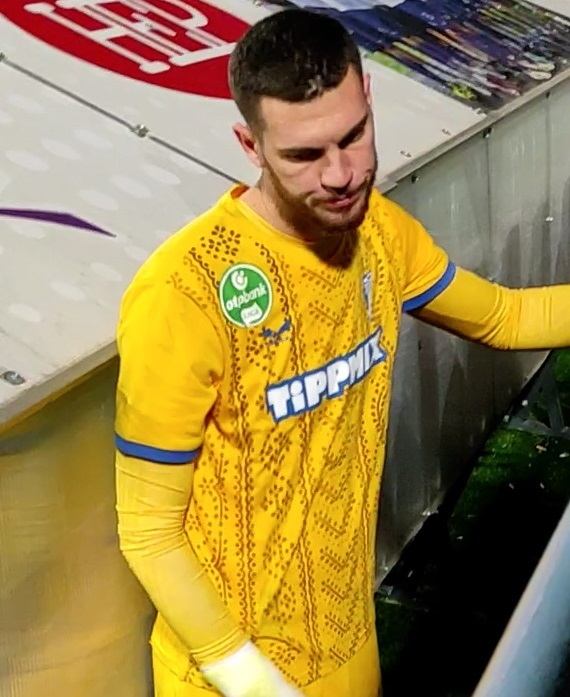
- Gundel-Takács with Zalaegerszeg in 2025

Personal information
- Date of birth: 6 April 1998 (age 28)
- Place of birth: Budapest, Hungary
- Height: 2.00 m (6 ft 7 in)
- Position: Goalkeeper

Team information
- Current team: Zalaegerszeg
- Number: 1

Youth career
- 2011–2014: MTK Budapest
- 2014–2017: Puskás Akadémia

Senior career*
| Years | Team | Apps | (Gls) |
| 2017 | Puskás Akadémia | 0 | (0) |
| 2017–2019 | Újpest | 5 | (0) |
| 2019–2022 | Fehérvár | 0 | (0) |
| 2019–2020 | → Fehérvár II | 8 | (0) |
| 2020–2021 | → Győri ETO (loan) | 29 | (0) |
| 2022 | → Jarun (loan) | 10 | (0) |
| 2022–2024 | Budafok | 70 | (0) |
| 2024– | Zalaegerszeg | 62 | (0) |
- * Club domestic league appearances and goals as of 30 May 2026

Bence Gundel-Takács (born 6 April 1998) is a Hungarian professional footballer, who plays as a goalkeeper for Nemzeti Bajnokság I club Zalaegerszeg.

== Career ==
=== Újpest ===
On 12 May 2018, Gundel-Takács played his first match for Újpest in a 0–1 loss against Puskás Akadémia in the Hungarian League.

=== Fehérvár FC ===
On 29 August 2019 Fehérvár FC announced, that they had signed Gundel-Takács.

=== Budafok ===
On 9 July 2022, Gundel-Takács signed with Budafok.

== Personal life ==
He is the son of sports reporter Gábor Gundel Takács.

== Career statistics ==
Appearances and goals by club, season and competition
| Club | Season | League | | | Cup | | Europe | | Total | |
| Club | Season | Division | Apps | Goals | Apps | Goals | Apps | Goals | Apps | Goals |
|---|---|---|---|---|---|---|---|---|---|---|
Újpest
| Újpest | 2017–18 | Nemzeti Bajnokság I | 3 | 0 | 1 | 0 | — | | 4 | 0 |
| Újpest | 2018–19 | Nemzeti Bajnokság I | 1 | 0 | 1 | 0 | 0 | 0 | 2 | 0 |
| Újpest | Total | | 4 | 0 | 2 | 0 | 0 | 0 | 6 | 0 |
| Career total | | | 4 | 0 | 2 | 0 | 0 | 0 | 6 | 0 |

Updated to games played as of 19 May 2019.

== Honours ==
Budafok

- Magyar Kupa runner-up: 2022–23
