= Ștefan Bîtca =

Moldovan footballer

Personal information
- Date of birth: 27 September 2005 (age 21)
- Place of birth: Orhei, Moldova
- Height: 1.74 m (5 ft 9 in)
- Position: Winger

Team information
- Current team: Sheriff Tiraspol
- Number: 7

Youth career
- 2013–2019: ȘS Orhei
- 2019–2024: Zimbru Chișinău

Senior career*
Years	Team	Apps	(Gls)
2022–2024	Zimbru-2 Chișinău	17	(10)
2023–2026	Zimbru Chișinău	45	(10)
2025–2026	→ Zalaegerszeg (loan)	6	(0)
2026–	Sheriff Tiraspol	2	(0)

International career^{‡}
2023	Moldova U19 (Note: Only official UEFA matches included)	3	(0)
2024–2025	Moldova U21	6	(0)
2025–	Moldova	4	(0)
- * Club domestic league appearances and goals as of 7 November 2026 ‡ National team caps and goals as of 9 June 2026

Ștefan Bîtca (born 27 September 2005) is a Moldovan professional footballer who plays as a winger for Moldovan Liga club Sheriff Tiraspol and the Moldova national team.

== Club career ==
Bîtca made his professional debut for Zimbru Chișinău on 1 August 2023 in a UEFA Europa Conference League second qualifying round match against Fenerbahçe, coming on as a 73rd-minute substitute in a 0–4 home loss.

== International career ==
On 19 May 2025, Bîtca received his first call up to the senior Moldova squad for the friendly match against Poland and the 2026 FIFA World Cup qualifying away match against Italy. However, he remained an unused substitute. He made his senior debut on 13 November 2025, appearing as a 55th-minute substitute in a 0–2 2026 FIFA World Cup qualifying home defeat against Italy.

== Honours ==
=== Club ===
Zimbru-2 Chișinău

- Liga 2: 2024–25; runner-up: 2022–23

Zimbru Chișinău

- Moldovan Cup runner-up: 2023–24

Zalaegerszeg

- Magyar Kupa runner-up: 2025–26
