= Alex Szabó (footballer, born 2002) =

Hungarian footballer

Personal information
- Date of birth: 15 May 2002 (age 24)
- Place of birth: Gyöngyös, Hungary
- Height: 1.89 m (6 ft 2 in)
- Position: Right-back

Team information
- Current team: Budapest Honvéd
- Number: 4

Youth career
- 2009–2014: Jászárokszállás
- 2014–2018: Gyöngyös

Senior career*
Years	Team	Apps	(Gls)
2017–2018	Gyöngyös	3	(0)
2018–	Budapest Honvéd II	21	(1)
2020–	Budapest Honvéd	100	(2)
2021–2022	→ Szolnok (loan)	35	(2)

International career^{‡}
2019	Hungary U-18	1	(0)
2022–	Hungary U-21	3	(0)
- * Club domestic league appearances and goals as of 31 May 2026 ‡ National team caps and goals as of 20 November 2022

Alex Szabó (born 15 May 2002) is a Hungarian professional footballer who plays for Budapest Honvéd.

== Club career ==
In July 2021, Szabó joined Szolnok on loan for the season.

== Career statistics ==
As of 31 October 2020.

Appearances and goals by club, season and competition
Club	Season	League			Cup		Continental		Other		Total	
Club	Season	Division	Apps	Goals	Apps	Goals	Apps	Goals	Apps	Goals	Apps	Goals
Gyöngyös	2017–18	Nemzeti Bajnokság III	3	0	0	0	—		—		3	0
Gyöngyös	Total		3	0	0	0	0	0	0	0	3	0
Budapest Honvéd II	2018–19	Nemzeti Bajnokság III	1	0	0	0	—		—		1	0
Budapest Honvéd II	2019–20	Nemzeti Bajnokság III	1	0	0	0	—		—		1	0
Budapest Honvéd II	2020–21	Nemzeti Bajnokság III	7	1	0	0	—		—		7	1
Budapest Honvéd II	Total		9	1	0	0	0	0	0	0	9	1
Budapest Honvéd	2020–21	Nemzeti Bajnokság I	1	0	1	0	0	0	—		2	0
Budapest Honvéd	Total		1	0	1	0	0	0	0	0	2	0
Career total			13	1	1	0	0	0	0	0	14	1
