= 2025–26 Ferencvárosi TC season =

Ferencváros
2025–26 season
- Ferencváros players celebrating their Magyar Kupa victory
- Chairman: Gábor Kubatov
- Manager: Robbie Keane
- Stadium: Groupama Aréna
- Nemzeti Bajnokság I: 2nd
- Magyar Kupa: Winners (25th title)
- Champions League: Play-off round
- Europa League: Round of 16
- Top goalscorer: League: Barnabás Varga (10); All: Barnabás Varga (20)
- Highest home attendance: 19,859 (v Braga, Europa League, Play-off, Round of 16, 12 March 2026)
- Lowest home attendance: 5,167 (v Csákvár, Magyar Kupa, Round of 16, 11 February 2026)
- Average home league attendance: 12,553
- Biggest win: 15 goals, (15–0) v Szarvaskend (A), Magyar Kupa, Round of 64, 13 September 2025
- Biggest defeat: 4 goals, (0–4) v Nottingham Forest (A), Europa League, League phase, Md8; 29 January 2026 (0–4) v Braga (A), Europa League, Knockout phase, Round of 16; 18 March 2026
- All statistics correct as of 16 May 2026 (completed).

The 2025–26 season is Ferencvárosi Torna Club's 122nd competitive season and 17th consecutive season in the Nemzeti Bajnokság I, where they will be competing as seven-time defending champions and 127th year in existence as a football club. In addition to the domestic league, Ferencváros participated in this season's editions of the Magyar Kupa and UEFA Champions League after winning the previous Nemzeti Bajnokság (domestic league) season.

Magyar Kupa

In the domestic cup (Magyar Kupa) Ferencváros joined the competition in the Round of 64 and advanced to the top 32 by defeating Eger 15–0, a member of the county championship (Tier 4). In the Round of 32, they won 4–0 at home against second-division (Nemzeti Bajnokság II) Békéscsaba and advanced to the top 16.

UEFA Champions League

In the UEFA Champions League Ferencváros joined the competition in the Second qualifying round and advanced with two wins against the Armenian team Noah 6–4 on aggregate (2–1 away and 4–3 at home). In the Third qualifying round, Ferencváros faced Bulgarian side Ludogorets Razgrad, and with a draw and a win, they advanced to the Play-off round with a 3–0 aggregate score (0–0 away and 3–0 at home). In the Play-off round Ferencváros lost 4–5 to Qarabağ from Azerbaijan. In the First leg match Ferencváros lost the first match at home 1–3. Ferencváros in the Second leg match won 3–2 at Qarabağ's home, but it was not enough to advance in League phase in Champions League and continued in League phase in UEFA Europa League.

== Kits ==
Supplier: Macron • Sponsor: Magyar Telekom / Tippmix / Midea / iFOREX • Shirt back sponsor: HSA Group • Sleeve sponsor: Groupama / MVM • Short sponsor: Volkswagen / MVM / Tippmix / Magyar Telekom

Home	Away	Third

Goalkeeper^{1}	Goalkeeper^{2}	Goalkeeper^{3}	Goalkeeper^{4}

== First team squad ==
As of 20 January 2026

Note: Flags indicate national team as defined under FIFA eligibility rules; some limited exceptions apply. Players may hold more than one non-FIFA nationality.

No.	Pos.	Nation	Player
1	GK	HUN	Ádám Varga
3	DF	SUI	Stefan Gartenmann (vice-captain)
4	DF	ARG	Mariano Gómez
5	MF	GUI	Naby Keïta
7	FW	NED	Elton Acolatse
8	FW	SRB	Aleksandar Pešić
10	FW	SWE	Jonathan Levi
11	FW	NGR	Bamidele Yusuf
15	MF	ISR	Mohammed Abu Fani
16	FW	NOR	Kristoffer Zachariassen
19	FW	CRO	Franko Kovačević
20	MF	BRA	Cadu
21	DF	HUN	Endre Botka
22	DF	HUN	Gábor Szalai
23	MF	HUN	Bence Ötvös
25	MF	LAT	Cebrail Makreckis
27	DF	FRA	Ibrahim Cissé (vice-captain)

No.	Pos.	Nation	Player
28	DF	BEL	Toon Raemaekers
29	GK	HUN	Gergő Szécsi
30	FW	HUN	Zsombor Gruber
36	MF	ISR	Gabi Kanichowsky
44	DF	FRA	Ismaïl Aaneba
47	MF	IRL	Callum O'Dowda
63	GK	HUN	Dániel Radnóti
66	MF	BRA	Júlio Romão
72	MF	HUN	Ádám Madarász
74	FW	HUN	Szilárd Szabó
75	FW	HAI	Lenny Joseph
76	FW	HUN	Krisztián Lisztes (on loan from Eintracht Frankfurt)
77	DF	HUN	Barnabás Nagy
80	MF	CIV	Habib Maïga
88	MF	BEL	Philippe Rommens
90	GK	HUN	Dénes Dibusz (captain)
99	GK	HUN	Dávid Gróf

== Transfers ==
=== Summer ===
In
Date	No.	Pos.	Nat.	Player	Moving from	Fee	Ref.
27 May 2025	20 (33)	MF	Brazil	Cadu	Viktoria Plzeň	Free	
2 June 2025	23	MF	Brazil	Bence Ötvös	Paks	Undisclosed	
11 June 2025	77	DF	Hungary	Barnabás Nagy	Nyíregyháza	Undisclosed	
13 June 2025	7	MF	Australia	Daniel Arzani	Melbourne Victory	Undisclosed	
17 June 2025	10	FW	Sweden	Jonathan Levi	Puskás Akadémia	Free	
24 June 2025	28	DF	Belgium	Toon Raemaekers	Mechelen	Undisclosed	
4 July 2025	47	MF	Republic of Ireland	Callum O'Dowda	Cardiff City	Undisclosed	
23 July 2025	36	MF	Israel	Gabi Kanichowsky	Maccabi Tel Aviv	Undisclosed	
31 August 2025	11	FW	Nigeria	Bamidele Yusuf	Vojvodina	Undisclosed	

On loan from
Date	No.	Pos.	Nat.	Player	Moving from	Until	Ref.
Pre-season	5	MF	Guinea	Naby Keïta	Werder Bremen	31 December 2025	
8 August 2025	TBD	MF	Hungary	Krisztián Lisztes	Eintracht Frankfurt	30 June 2026	

Returned back after loan expired
Date	No.	Pos.	Nat.	Player	Moving from	Division	Ref.
30 June 2025		MF	Hungary	Péter Baráth	Raków Częstochowa	Ekstraklasa	
30 June 2025	40	FW	Nigeria	Fortune Bassey	DAC 1904	Slovak First Football League	
30 June 2025	21	DF	Hungary	Endre Botka	Kecskemét	Nemzeti Bajnokság I	
30 June 2025		MF	Hungary	Bálint Katona	Kecskemét	Nemzeti Bajnokság I	
30 June 2025		DF	Hungary	Lóránd Pászka	Kecskemét	Nemzeti Bajnokság I	
30 June 2025	30	FW	Hungary	Zsombor Gruber	MTK	Nemzeti Bajnokság I	
30 June 2025		FW	Hungary	Zétény Varga	Diósgyőr	Nemzeti Bajnokság I	
30 June 2025		FW	Bosnia and Herzegovina	Kenan Kodro	Gaziantep	Süper Lig	
30 June 2025	17	FW	Armenia	Edgar Sevikyan	Lokomotiv Moscow	Russian Premier League	

Out
Date	No.	Pos.	Nat.	Player	Moving to	Fee	Ref.
4 June 2025	7	MF	Tunisia	Mohamed Ali Ben Romdhane	al-Ahli	Undisclosed	
4 June 2025	17	MF	Bosnia and Herzegovina	Eldar Ćivić	Baltika Kaliningrad	Undisclosed	
12 June 2025	93	FW	Suriname	Virgil Misidjan	NEC Nijmegen	450,000 €	
13 June 2025	18	FW	Ghana	Owusu Kwabena	Maccabi Bnei Reineh	End of contract	
2 July 2025	59	MF	Hungary	Balázs Manner	Nyíregyháza	Undisclosed	
11 July 2025	11	FW	Brazil	Matheus Saldanha	Al Wasl	Undisclosed	
24 July 2025	99	DF	Ecuador	Cristian Ramírez	Lokomotiv Moscow	Mutual agreement	
28 July 2025	34	DF	Brazil	Raul Gustavo	New York City FC	Mutual agreement	
4 August 2025	23	MF	Hungary	Lóránd Pászka	Csíkszereda	Undisclosed	
14 August 2025		MF	Hungary	Bálint Katona	Nyíregyháza	Undisclosed	
19 August 2025	20	FW	Mali	Adama Traoré	Gençlerbirliği	Undisclosed	
4 September 2025	37	FW	Brazil	Guilherme Henrique	TBD	Undisclosed	

Out on loan
Date	No.	Pos.	Nat.	Player	Moving to	Loan date	Ref.
3 July 2025	70	MF	Ghana	Isaac Pappoe	Dundee United	30 June 2026	
9 July 2025	1	GK	Hungary	Ádám Varga	Debrecen	30 June 2026	
10 July 2025	75	DF	Ghana	Shay Shadirac	AC Oulu	30 June 2026	
1 September 2025		FW	Bosnia and Herzegovina	Kenan Kodro	Zaragoza	30 June 2026	
2 September 2025	54	DF	Hungary	Norbert Kaján	Csíkszereda	30 June 2026	
3 September 2025		FW	Hungary	Szilárd Szabó	Kisvárda	30 June 2026	
8 September 2025	32	FW	Serbia	Aleksandar Ćirković	Lechia Gdańsk	30 June 2026	
10 September 2025	17	MF	Armenia	Edgar Sevikyan	Akron Tolyatti	30 June 2026	

=== Winter ===
In
Date	No.	Pos.	Nat.	Player	Moving from	Fee	Ref.
7 January 2026	4	DF	Argentina	Mariano Gómez	Zürich	Undisclosed	
20 January 2026	19	FW	Croatia	Franko Kovačević	Celje	Undisclosed	
20 January 2026	7	FW	Netherlands	Elton Acolatse	Diósgyőr	Undisclosed	
26 January 2026	17	MF	Romania	Marius Corbu	APOEL	Undisclosed	
6 February 2026	14	DF	Hungary	Attila Osváth	Paks	Undisclosed	

Returned back from loan
Date	No.	Pos.	Nat.	Player	Moving from	Ref.
9 January 2026	1	GK	Hungary	Ádám Varga	Debrecen	

Out on loan
Date	No.	Pos.	Nat.	Player	Moving to	Loan date	Ref.
26 January 2026	7	FW	Australia	Daniel Arzani	Melbourne City	30 June 2026	

=== New contracts ===
Date	No.	Pos.	Nat.	Player	Until	Ref.
11 July 2025		N/A	Hungary	Zoltán Benczik	Undisclosed	
11 July 2025		N/A	Hungary	Zsombor Knáb	Undisclosed	
11 July 2025		N/A	Hungary	Kristóf Kovács	Undisclosed	
11 July 2025		N/A	Hungary	Zalán Ledniczky	Undisclosed	
11 July 2025		N/A	Hungary	Boldizsár Vén	Undisclosed	

=== Contract extension ===
Date	No.	Pos.	Nat.	Player	Extension to	Ref.
29 May 2025	29	GK	Hungary	Gergő Szécsi	N/A	
19 June 2025	89	GK	Hungary	Dávid Gróf	N/A	
30 August 2025	64	MF	Hungary	Alex Tóth	N/A	
14 January 2026	5	MF	Guinea	Naby Keïta	N/A	

=== Kit number changes ===
Date	Pos.	Nat.	Player	Old	Round	New	Round
31 August 2025	MF	Brazil	Cadu	33	until Nemzeti Bajnokság, Round 4	20	from Nemzeti Bajnokság, Round 6

== Friendlies ==
Win Draw Loss Fixtures

=== Pre-season ===
27 June 2025 Friendly	Mezőkövesd (NB II)	0–4	Ferencváros	Mezőkövesd
10:00 CEST		Report	Zachariassen 36'; Joseph 38', 41'; Baráth 53'	Attendance: 0 (Closed doors)
Note: • Ferencváros 1st half: Gróf — Cissé, Raemaekers, Raul Gustavo — Makreckis, Ötvös, N. Keïta, Cadu, Joseph — Pešić, Zachariassen • Ferencváros 2nd half: Á. Varga — Kaján, Botka, Lakatos (Henrique), B. Nagy (Sz. Szabó (substituted on) ) — Baráth, Madarász, Traoré, Gruber, Ćirković — Saldanha (Levi (substituted on) 63') • Manager: Robbie Keane

Summer Training Camp in Austria from 6 July to 15 July:

9 July 2025 Friendly	Zlín (Czech I) (Football Association of the Czech Republic)	0–1	Ferencváros	Lienz, Austria
17:00 CEST		Report	Zachariassen 69' (pen.)	Stadium: Dolomitenstadion
Note: • Ferencváros 1st half: Dibusz — Cadu, Ötvös, Raemaekers, Szalai, O'Dowda — Tóth, Abu Fani, Levi — B. Varga, Joseph • Ferencváros 2nd half: Dibusz (Gróf (substituted on) 60') — Cadu (B. Nagy (substituted on) 60'), Ötvös (Baráth (substituted on) 60'), Botka, Szalai (Sevikyan (substituted on) 60'), Makreckis — Tóth (Arzani (substituted on) 60'), N. Keïta, Levi (Zachariassen (substituted on) 60') — Pešić, Joseph (Ćirković (substituted on) 60') • Manager: Robbie Keane

15 July 2025 Friendly	Karlsruher SC (Bundesliga II) (German Football Association)	1–2	Ferencváros	Lienz, Austria
11:30 CEST	Farhat 48'	Report	N. Keïta 23'; Sevikyan 82'	Stadium: Dolomitenstadion
Note: • Ferencváros: Dibusz — Gartenmann (Ćirković (substituted on) 75'), Cissé (Szalai (substituted on) 75'), Ötvös (Maïga (substituted on) 65') — Makreckis (B. Nagy (substituted on) 59'), Tóth (Abu Fani (substituted on) 75' (substituted off) 90' (Zachariassen (substituted on) 90')), N. Keïta (Botka (substituted on) 75'), Levi (Sevikyan (substituted on) 75'), O'Dowda (Cadu (substituted on) 59') — B. Varga (Pešić (substituted on) 59'), Joseph (Raemaekers (substituted on) 59') • Manager: Robbie Keane

=== Mid-season ===
Winter training camp in La Manga, Spain, from 8 January until 19 January 2026.

10 January 2026 Friendly	Holstein Kiel (Bundesliga II) (German Football Association)	2–0	Ferencváros	La Manga, Spain
14:00 (CET)	Niehoff (yellow card) 30'; Harres 34', 84'	Report
Note: • Ferencváros 1st half: Gróf — Lakatos, B. Nagy, Levi — Abu Fani, Romão, Madarász — Zachariassen, Gruber, Lisztes (Gólik (substituted on) 25') • Ferencváros 2nd half: Gróf — Cissé, Raemaekers, Gómez — Cadu, O'Dowda — Ötvös, Tóth, Kanichowsky — Yusuf, Joseph • Manager: Keane

12 January 2026 Friendly	Rapid Wien (Austrian I) (Austrian Football Association)	1–0	Ferencváros	La Manga, Spain
15:00 (CET)	Seidl 51'; Tilio (yellow card) 89'	Report	Cadu (yellow card) 28'; Abu Fani (yellow card) 76'
Note: • Ferencváros: Á. Varga — Cissé (Abu Fani (substituted on) 65'), Raemaekers (Rommens (substituted on) 65'), Szalai (Gómez (substituted on) 46') — Cadu (Ötvös (substituted on) 46'), Zachariassen (Levi (substituted on) 65'), Romão (Tóth (substituted on) 46'), Kanichowsky (Madarász (substituted on) 65'), O'Dowda (B. Nagy (substituted on) 57') — Joseph (Lisztes (substituted on) 65'), Yusuf (Gruber (substituted on) 65') • Manager: Keane

15 January 2026 Friendly	Midtjylland (Danish I) (Danish Football Association)	1–1	Ferencváros	La Manga, Spain
14:00 (CET)	Castillo 15'; Erlić (yellow card) 32'; Djabi (yellow card) 62'; Tullberg (yellow card) 67'; Uhre (yellow card) 85'	Report	Gómez (yellow card) 71' (goal) 90'
Note: • Ferencváros: Gróf — Cissé, Raemaekers, Szalai (Gómez (substituted on) 54') — Cadu, Zachariassen (Gruber (substituted on) 68'), Romão, Kanichowsky (Madarász (substituted on) 74'), B. Nagy — Levi (Joseph 68.), Yusuf (Abu Fani (substituted on) 74') • Manager: Keane

== Competitions ==
=== Overall record ===
In italics, we indicate the Last match and the Final position achieved in competition(s) that have not yet been completed.

Competition	First match	Last match	Starting round	Final position	Record							
Competition	First match	Last match	Starting round	Final position	Pld	W	D	L	GF	GA	GD	Win %
Nemzeti Bajnokság I	26 July 2025	16 May 2026	Matchday 1	(silver) 2nd place	33	21	5	7	67	31	+36	63.64
Magyar Kupa	13 September 2025	9 May 2026	Round of 64	(gold) Winners	6	5	1	0	31	2	+29	83.33
UEFA Champions League	22 July 2025	27 August 2025	2nd qualifying round	Play-off round	6	4	1	1	13	9	+4	66.67
UEFA Europa League	25 September 2025	18 March 2026	League phase	Round of 16	12	6	3	3	17	17	+0	50.00
Total					57	36	10	11	128	59	+69	63.16

Last updated: complete
Source: Soccerway

=== Nemzeti Bajnokság I ===
==== League table ====
Pos	Team	Pld	W	D	L	GF	GA	GD	Pts	Qualification or relegation
1	Győr (C)	33	20	9	4	65	30	+35	69	Qualification for the Champions League first qualifying round
2	Ferencváros	33	21	5	7	67	31	+36	68	Qualification for the Europa League first qualifying round (Note: The 2025–26 Magyar Kupa winners (Ferencváros) qualify for the Europa League first qualifying round.)
3	Paks	33	15	8	10	63	46	+17	53	Qualification for the Conference League second qualifying round
4	Debrecen	33	14	11	8	51	41	+10	53	Qualification for the Conference League second qualifying round
5	Zalaegerszeg	33	13	9	11	49	43	+6	48	

Source: Hungarian Football Federation (in Hungarian)
Rules for classification: 1) Points; 2) Matches won; 3) Goal difference; 4) Goals scored; 5) Head-to-head points; 6) Head-to-head goal difference; 7) Fair play ranking; 8) Drawing of lots.
(C) Champions

==== Results summary ====
Overall								Home						Away					
Pld	W	D	L	GF	GA	GD	Pts	W	D	L	GF	GA	GD	W	D	L	GF	GA	GD
33	21	5	7	67	31	+36	68	9	2	5	33	19	+14	12	3	2	34	12	+22

Last updated: 16 May 2026.
Source: Soccerway

==== Results by round ====
A = Away; H = Home; W = Win; D = Draw; L = Loss

Round	1	2	3	4	6	7	8	9	10	11	12	13	14	15	5^{1}	16	17	18	19	20	21	22	23	24	25	27	28	29	26^{2}	30	31	32	33
Ground	A	H	A	H	A	H	A	H	A	H	H	A	H	A	A	H	H	A	H	A	H	A	A	H	A	A	A	H	H	A	H	A	H
Result	D	W	W	L	W	D	W	D	D	L	W	W	L	W	W	W	L	W	L	W	W	L	W	W	W	D	W	W	W	L	W	W	W
Position	7	3	1	3	2	2	3	2	2	2	3	1	1	1	1	1	2	2	3	2	1	2	2	2	1	1	1	1	1	2	2	2	2
Points	1	4	7	7	10	11	14	15	16	16	19	22	22	25	28	31	31	34	34	37	40	40	43	46	49	50	53	56	59	59	62	65	68

Updated to match(es) played on 16 May 2026. Source:
Notes:
^{1} Round 5 match (Kisvárda–Ferencváros) has been postponed after Round 15, to 4 December 2025.
^{2} Round 26 match (Ferencváros–Puskás Akadémia) has been postponed after Round 29, to 14 April 2026.

==== Matches ====
Win Draw Loss Fixtures Postponed

The draw for the 2025/26 season was held on 16 June 2025.

26 July 2025 1	MTK	1–1	Ferencváros	Budapest
20:15 CEST	R. Molnár 54'; P. Kovács (yellow card) 69'	Report	Joseph 44'; N. Keïta (yellow card) 94'	Stadium: Hidegkuti Nándor Stadion; Attendance: 4,285; Referee: Gergő Bogár; Assistant referees: István Albert, Georgiou Theodoros
Note: • Ferencváros: Dibusz (c) — Makreckis, Ötvös, Cissé, Szalai, O'Dowda (B. Nagy (substituted on) 78') — Tóth, Maïga (N. Keïta (substituted on) 62'), Levi (Sevikyan (substituted on) 78') — Joseph (Gruber (substituted on) 86'), B. Varga (Pešić (substituted on) 78') • Manager: Keane • Player of the match: Jonathan Levi, Ferencváros 7.7

2 August 2025 2	Ferencváros	3–0	Kazincbarcika	Budapest
20:15 CEST	Raemaekers (yellow card) 9'; Kanichowsky 12'; B. Varga 26'; Zachariassen (yellow card) 61'; Cissé (yellow card) 78'; Gruber 83' (pen.)	Report	Major (yellow card) 28'; Haroyan (yellow card) 29'; Szőke (yellow card) 30'; Sós (yellow card) 73'; Baranyai (yellow card) 82'	Stadium: Groupama Aréna; Attendance: 8,325; Referee: Péter Antal; Assistant referees: Balázs Buzás, Péter Garai
Note: • Ferencváros: Dibusz (c) — Botka, Cissé, Raemaekers (Szalai (substituted on) 46') — Cadu, Zachariassen (Ötvös (substituted on) 63'), N. Keïta (Maïga (substituted on) 63'), Kanichowsky (Ćirković (substituted on) 87'), B. Nagy — Gruber, B. Varga (Joseph (substituted on) 71') • Manager: Keane • Player of the match: Zsombor Gruber, Ferencváros 10.0 • Best player of Kazincbarcika: Gergő Szőke 7.8 • MVP: Zsombor Gruber

9 August 2025 3	Nyíregyháza	1–4	Ferencváros	Nyíregyháza
20:15 CEST	Temesvári (yellow card) 17'; Jokić (yellow card) 61'; Edomwonyi 66' (pen.) (yellow card) 73'	Report	Gruber 12', 74' (pen.); B. Varga 22'; Levi 33' (yellow card) 39'; Botka (yellow card) 45+3'; Cissé (yellow card) 61'; N. Keïta (yellow card) 81'	Stadium: Városi Stadion; Attendance: 7,980; Referee: Bence Csonka dr. Assistant referees: Gergő Vígh-Tarsonyi, Gergely Becséri
Note: • Ferencváros: Gróf — Botka, Raemaekers, Cissé (c) (Szalai (substituted on) 68') — Cadu, Maïga, Levi (Zachariassen (substituted on) 77'), N. Keïta (Arzani (substituted on) 83'), B. Nagy — B. Varga (Joseph (substituted on) 68'), Gruber (Madarász (substituted on) 83') • Manager: Keane • Player of the match: Zsombor Gruber, Ferencváros 8.8 • Best player of Nyíregyháza: Mátyás Katona 7.3

16 August 2025 4	Ferencváros	1–2	Puskás Akadémia	Budapest
20:15 CEST	Cadu 24' (yellow card) 89'; Joseph (yellow card) 90+4'	Report	Lukács 20', 71'; Soisalo (yellow card) 76'; Arutyunyan (yellow card) 76'; Favorov (yellow card) 89'	Stadium: Groupama Aréna; Attendance: 10,679; Referee: Ferenc Karakó; Assistant referees: Ákos Berélnyi, Péter Ország
Note: • Ferencváros: Gróf — Botka (Arzani (substituted on) 78'), Cissé (c), Szalai, Cadu — Levi, N. Keïta (Tóth (substituted on) 65'), B. Nagy — Zachariassen (Ötvös (substituted on) 65'), Pešić (B. Varga (substituted on) 46'), Gruber (Joseph (substituted on) 65') • Manager: Keane • Player of the match: Dániel Lukács, Puskás Akadémia 8.8 • Best player of Ferencváros: Cadu and Jonathan Levi 7.7 each

31 August 2025 6	Debrecen	0–3	Ferencváros	Debrecen
20:00 CEST	T. Szűcs (yellow card) 46'; M. Szécsi (yellow card) 69'; Lang (yellow card) 78'	Report	B. Varga 14', 40'; Gruber 88'	Stadium: Nagyerdei Stadion; Attendance: 10,674; Referee: Márton Rúsz; Assistant referees: István Albert, Gergő Vígh-Tarsonyi
Note: • Ferencváros: Dibusz (c) — Gartenmann, Raemaekers, Szalai — Tóth (Ötvös (substituted on) 70'), N. Keïta (Levi (substituted on) 70'), Kanichowsky — Cadu (Makreckis (substituted on) 85'), B. Nagy (O'Dowda (substituted on) 85') — B. Varga, Pešić (Gruber (substituted on) 57') • Manager: Keane • Player of the match: Barnabás Varga, Ferencváros 8.6 • Best player of Debrecen: Donát Bárány and Botond Vajda 6.9 each

19 September 2025 7	Ferencváros	2–2	Diósgyőr	Budapest
20:00 CEST	Gruber 68', 90+1' (yellow card) 77'; Ötvös (yellow card) 88'	Report	Babos 32'; Acolatse 45+3'; Sajbán (yellow card) 65'; Šaponjić (yellow card) 75'	Stadium: Groupama Aréna; Attendance: 11,769; Referee: Gergő Bogár; Assistant referees: Balázs Szalai, Péter Ország
Note: • Ferencváros: Dibusz (c) — Gartenmann, Raemaekers, Szalai (Ötvös (substituted on) 46') — N. Keïta (Makreckis (substituted on) 46') — Cadu, Tóth, Kanichowsky (Abu Fani (substituted on) 46'), B. Nagy (Gruber (substituted on) 46') — B. Varga, Yusuf (Pešić (substituted on) 65') • Manager: Keane • Player of the match: Elton Acolatse, Diósgyőr 9.9 • Best player of Ferencváros: Zsombor Gruber 8.8

28 September 2025 8	Győr	0–2	Ferencváros	Győr
18:00 CEST	Gavrić (yellow card) 58'; Vingler (yellow card) 88'	Report	Levi 18'; Ötvös (yellow card) 29'; B. Varga 64'; Tóth (yellow card) 64'	Stadium: ETO Park; Attendance: 8,280; Referee: Tamás Bognár; Assistant referees: Gergely Becséri, Dávid Rózsa
Note: • Ferencváros: Dibusz (c) — Gartenmann, Raemaekers, Szalai — Cadu, Levi (Zachariassen (substituted on) 70'), Kanichowsky (O'Dowda (substituted on) 80'), Ötvös (Tóth (substituted on) 46'), B. Nagy — Pešić (B. Varga (substituted on) 59'), Gruber (Joseph (substituted on) 75') • Manager: Keane • Player of the match: Toon Raemaekers, Ferencváros 7.9 • Best player of Győri ETO: Ahmed Benbouali 7.2

5 October 2025 9	Ferencváros	2–2	Paks	Budapest
16:30 CEST	Szalai (yellow card) 19'; B. Varga 31'; Ötvös (yellow card) 47'; Yusuf (yellow card) 54'; Pešić 87'; Abu Fani (yellow card) 90+2'; Tóth (yellow card) 90+2'	Report	Kinyik (yellow card) 19'; Pető 21'; Haraszti (yellow card) 40'; B. Balogh (yellow card) 43'; Windecker 90+3' (pen.); Hahn (yellow card) 90+8'	Stadium: Groupama Aréna; Attendance: 14,071; Referee: Bence Csonka dr. Assistant referees: István Albert, Bence Belicza
Note: • Ferencváros: Dibusz (c) — Gartenmann, Raemaekers, Szalai — Makreckis, Levi (Abu Fani (substituted on) 54'), Kanichowsky (Tóth (substituted on) 68'), Ötvös (Gruber 83), B. Nagy — Joseph (Yusuf (substituted on) 46'), B. Varga (Pešić (substituted on) 68') • Manager: Keane (yellow card) 90+2' • Player of the match: Aleksandar Pešić, Ferencváros 7.9 • Best player of Paks: Milán Pető 7.8

19 October 2025 10	Újpest	1–1	Ferencváros	Budapest
18:00 CEST	Rasak (yellow card) 17'; Matko 63'; Geiger (yellow card) 87'; Ljujić (yellow card) 87'	Report	B. Varga 22'; Abu Fani (yellow card) 87'; Joseph (yellow card) 88'; Ötvös (yellow card) 90+4'; Gróf (red card) 90+6'	Stadium: Szusza Ferenc Stadion; Attendance: 10,569; Referee: Gergő Bogár; Assistant referees: Balázs Szert, Dániel Szalai
Note: • Ferencváros: Gróf — Makreckis, Gartenmann (c), Raemaekers, Szalai, B. Nagy (Gruber (substituted on) 81') — Tóth (Ötvös (substituted on) 90'), N. Keïta (Abu Fani (substituted on) 70'), Kanichowsky (Pešić (substituted on) 81') — B. Varga, Levi (Joseph (substituted on) 70') • Manager: Keane • Player of the match: Krisztofer Horváth, Újpest 7.9 • Best player of Ferencváros: Barnabás Varga 7.5

26 October 2025 11	Ferencváros	1–2	Zalaegerszeg	Budapest
17:30 CET	B. Varga 34'; N. Keïta (yellow card) 45+2'; Ötvös (yellow card) 83'	Report	Skribek 42'; Calderón 54'; Szendrei (yellow card) 60'; G. Bodnár (yellow card) 69'; Gundel-Takács (yellow card) 90+5'	Stadium: Groupama Aréna; Attendance: 8,697; Referee: Péter Antal; Assistant referees: József Aradi, Viktor Nagy
Note: • Ferencváros: Dibusz (c) — Ötvös, Cissé, Szalai — Cadu, Abu Fani (Kanichowsky (substituted on) 46'), N. Keïta (Levi (substituted on) 46'), Gruber (Pešić (substituted on) 67'), O'Dowda (B. Nagy (substituted on) 63') — B. Varga, Yusuf (Arzani (substituted on) 46') • Manager: Keane • Player of the match: Bence Gundel-Takács, Zalaegerszeg 8.7 • Best player of Ferencváros: Gábor Szalai 7.5

1 November 2025 12	Ferencváros	4–1	MTK	Budapest
20:00 CET	Gartenmann (yellow card) 7' (goal) 19'; Szalai 70'; B. Varga 80'; B. Nagy 82'	Report	Cadu 89' (o.g.)	Stadium: Groupama Aréna; Attendance: 8,715; Referee: Ferenc Karakó; Assistant referees: Balázs Szert, Dávid Rózsa
Note: • Ferencváros: Dibusz (c) — Gartenmann (Szalai (substituted on) 20'), Cissé, Raemaekers — Cadu, Zachariassen (Joseph (substituted on) 76'), Kanichowsky, Tóth (Abu Fani (substituted on) 46'), B. Nagy (Lisztes (substituted on) 83') — Gruber (Madarász (substituted on) 76'), B. Varga • Manager: Keane (yellow card) 47' • Player of the match: Gábor Szalai, Ferencváros 8.1 • Best player of MTK: Patrik Demjén 8.0

9 November 2025 13	Kazincbarcika	1–3	Ferencváros	Mezőkövesd
15:15 CET	Kártik 11' (pen.); Rasheed (yellow card) 48'	Report	B. Varga 35'; Tóth 43'; Makreckis 82'	Stadium: Városi Stadion; Attendance: 2,981; Referee: Balázs Berke; Assistant referees: Bence Belicza, Viktor Nagy
Note: • Ferencváros: Dibusz (c) — Raemaekers, Cissé, Szalai — Tóth (Ötvös (substituted on) 75'), Kanichowsky (Madarász (substituted on) 90'), N. Keïta (Romão (substituted on) 70') — Makreckis, B. Nagy — Joseph (Yusuf (substituted on) 70'), B. Varga (Levi (substituted on) 90') • Manager: Keane (yellow card) 39' • Player of the match: Alex Tóth, Ferencváros 8.2 • Best player of Kazincbarcika: Varazdat Haroyan 7.3

22 November 2025 14	Ferencváros	1–3	Nyíregyháza	Budapest
19:30 CET	Gruber 84' (pen.); B. Varga (yellow card) 90+4'	Report	Manner 3'; Kovácsréti 30' (yellow card) 73'; Antonov (yellow card) 57'; D. Kovács (yellow card) 79'; Toma 85' (yellow card) 90+2'	Stadium: Groupama Aréna; Attendance: 6,477; Referee: Tamás Bognár; Assistant referees: Vencel Tóth II, Gergő Vígh-Tarsonyi
Note: • Ferencváros: Dibusz (c) — Cissé, Ötvös, Szalai — Makreckis (Cadu (substituted on) 46'), Joseph (Gruber (substituted on) 46'), Kanichowsky (Abu Fani (substituted on) 46'), Tóth, B. Nagy (Yusuf (substituted on) 61') — Joseph, Pešić (B. Varga (substituted on) 61') • Manager: Keane (yellow card) 39' • Player of the match: Yuriy Toma, Nyíregyháza 7.7 • Best player of Ferencváros: Alex Tóth 7.2

30 November 2025 15	Puskás Akadémia	1–2	Ferencváros	Felcsút
19:30 CET	Okeke (yellow card) 43'; Markgráf (yellow card) 57'; P. Dárdai 67'	Report	Romão (yellow card) 45'; Kanichowsky 54'; Gruber 60' (pen.)	Stadium: Pancho Aréna; Attendance: 3,242; Referee: Márton Rúsz; Assistant referees: Péter Kóbor, Péter Ország
Note: • Ferencváros: Dibusz (c) — Cissé, Raemaekers, Szalai — Makreckis, Kanichowsky (Zachariassen (substituted on) 81'), Romão (Ötvös (substituted on) 46'), Tóth, B. Nagy (O'Dowda (substituted on) 81') — Gruber (Madarász (substituted on) 90+1'), Joseph (Yusuf (substituted on) 81') • Manager: Keane • Player of the match: Gabi Kanichowsky, Ferencváros 7.8 • Best player of Puskás Akadémia: Palkó Dárdai 7.7

4 December 2025 5	Kisvárda	0–1	Ferencváros	Kisvárda
18:00 CET	Sz. Szabó (yellow card) 72'; Jovičić (yellow card) 80'	Report	Ötvös 74' (pen.); Gróf (yellow card) 85'	Stadium: Várkerti Stadion; Attendance: 3,150; Referee: Balázs Berke; Assistant referees: Gergely Becséri, Dávid Rózsa
Note: • Ferencváros: Gróf — Cissé (c), Raemaekers, Szalai — Cadu, Tóth (Romão (substituted on) 87'), N. Keïta (Ötvös (substituted on) 46'), Kanichowsky (Zachariassen (substituted on) 58'), O'Dowda (B. Nagy (substituted on) 72') — Gruber (Yusuf (substituted on) 58'), B. Varga • Manager: Keane • Player of the match: Barnabás Nagy, Ferencváros 7.5 • Best player of Kisvárda: Illya Popovych 7.1

7 December 2025 16	Ferencváros	3–0	Kisvárda	Budapest
17:00 CET	B. Nagy 11'; Ötvös 21' (pen.); Yusuf 26'	Report	Novothny (yellow card) 13'; K. Nagy (yellow card) 75'; Cipetić (yellow card) 90'	Stadium: Groupama Aréna; Attendance: 7,057; Referee: Gergő Bogár; Assistant referees: Norbert Bornemissza, József Aradi
Note: • Ferencváros: Gróf — Cissé (c) (Romão (substituted on) 71'), Raemaekers, Szalai (Lakatos (substituted on) 85') — Makreckis, Ötvös, Levi, Zachariassen (Madarász (substituted on) 63'), B. Nagy — B. Varga (Pešić (substituted on) 71'), Yusuf (Joseph (substituted on) 71') • Manager: Keane • Player of the match: Barnabás Nagy, Ferencváros 8.6 • Best player of Kisvárda: Marko Matanović 7.0

14 December 2025 17	Ferencváros	0–1	Debrecen	Budapest
14:45 CET	Romão (yellow card) 34'; B. Varga (yellow card) 90+1'	Report	Bárány 74'; Youga (yellow card) 89'	Stadium: Groupama Aréna; Attendance: 10,657; Referee: Balázs Berke; Assistant referees: Vencel Tóth II, Georgiou Theodoros
Note: • Ferencváros: Gróf — Cissé (c), Raemaekers, Szalai — Cadu (Makreckis (substituted on) 61'), Levi (Kanichowsky (substituted on) 61'), Romão (Ötvös (substituted on) 46' (substituted off) 80' (Gruber (substituted on) 80')), Tóth, B. Nagy — B. Varga, Joseph (Yusuf (substituted on) 61') • Manager: Keane • Player of the match: Donát Bárány, Debrecen 7.6 • Best player of Ferencváros: Toon Raemaekers 7.6

19 December 2025 18	Diósgyőr	0–1	Ferencváros	Miskolc
20:00 CET	Szatmári (yellow card) 68'; Bényei (yellow card) 71'; Mi. Mucsányi (yellow card) 83'	Report	O'Dowda (yellow card) 45+1'; Tóth (yellow card) 51'; Szalai 57'; Raemaekers (yellow card) 62'; B. Varga (yellow card) 90+4'	Stadium: Diósgyőri Stadion; Attendance: 6,510; Referee: Tamás Bognár; Assistant referees: Balázs Buzás, Bence Belicza
Note: • Ferencváros: Gróf — Cissé (c), Raemaekers, Szalai — Makreckis, Tóth, Kanichowsky (Romão (substituted on) 90+1'), Madarász, O'Dowda — B. Varga, Yusuf (Joseph (substituted on) 68') • Manager: Keane • Player of the match: Ibrahim Cissé, Ferencváros 7.8 • Best player of Diósgyőr: Máté Sajbán 7.4

25 January 2026 19	Ferencváros	1–3	Győr	Budapest
18:15 CET	Kovačević 49'; Ötvös (yellow card) 88'	Report	Schön (yellow card) 33'; Vitális (yellow card) 40'; Benbouali 61'; Krpić (yellow card) 67'; Bumba 72'; Štefulj 86'	Stadium: Groupama Aréna; Attendance: 8,675; Referee: Balázs Berke; Assistant referees: Georgiou Theodoros, Balázs Szert
Note: • Ferencváros: Gróf — Cissé (c), Raemaekers, Szalai (Gruber (substituted on) 78') — Makreckis, Ötvös, Madarász, Kanichowsky (Abu Fani (substituted on) 78'), B. Nagy — Acolatse (Yusuf (substituted on) 62'), Kovačević (Joseph (substituted on) 87') • Manager: Keane • Player of the match: Ahmed Benbouali, Győri ETO 8.2 • Best player of Ferencváros: Gabi Kanichowsky 7.7

1 February 2026 20	Paks	0–1	Ferencváros	Paks
15:15 CET	Zeke (yellow card) 37'; Osváth (yellow card) 44'	Report	Kovačević (yellow card) 39'; B. Nagy (yellow card) 41'; Ötvös (yellow card) 61'; Gruber 71'; Gróf (yellow card) 90+1'	Stadium: Fehérvári úti Stadion; Attendance: 4,691; Referee: Gergő Bogár; Assistant referees: István Albert, Bence Belicza
Note: • Ferencváros: Gróf — Gómez, Raemaekers, Szalai — Cissé (c), Ötvös, Abu Fani (Acolatse (substituted on) 67'), Kanichowsky (Romão (substituted on) 80'), B. Nagy — Gruber (Madarász (substituted on) 80'), Kovačević (Joseph (substituted on) 80') • Manager: Keane • Player of the match: Zsombor Gruber, Ferencváros 7.7 • Best player of Paks: Attila Osváth 7.4

7 February 2026 21	Ferencváros	3–0	Újpest	Budapest
17:00 CET	Kovačević 10'; Gómez 36' (yellow card) 87'; Kanichowsky 45+1'; Romão (yellow card) 90'; Raemaekers (yellow card) 90+4'	Report	Fiola (yellow card) 90+4'; Kr. Horváth (yellow card) 90+4'	Stadium: Groupama Aréna; Attendance: 18,779; Referee: Tamás Bognár; Assistant referees: Balázs Buzás, Norbert Bornemissza
Note: • Ferencváros: Gróf — Gómez, Cissé (c), Raemaekers — Osváth, Ötvös (Madarász (substituted on) 88'), Kanichowsky (Zachariassen (substituted on) 71'), Abu Fani (Romão (substituted on) 64'), B. Nagy — Gruber (Corbu (substituted on) 64'), Kovačević (Yusuf (substituted on) 71') • Manager: Keane • Player of the match: Attila Osváth, Ferencváros 8.1 • Best player of Újpest: Krisztofer Horváth 7.1

14 February 2026 22	Zalaegerszeg	3–1	Ferencváros	Zalaegerszeg
17:00 CET	Calderón 65'; Amato (yellow card) 74'; Várkonyi (yellow card) 76'; Skribek 89' (pen.); Daniel 90+8' (yellow card) 90+8'	Report	Ötvös 13'; Cissé (red card) 28'; B. Nagy (yellow card) 90+5'	Stadium: ZTE Arena; Attendance: 6,148; Referee: Mihály Káprály; Assistant referees: Dániel Szalai, Viktor Nagy
Note: • Ferencváros: Gróf — Cissé (c), Raemaekers, Gómez — Osváth, Abu Fani (Zachariassen (substituted on) 68'), Ötvös, Kanichowsky (Romão (substituted on) 84'), B. Nagy — Gruber (Szalai (substituted on) 30'), Kovačević (Yusuf (substituted on) 68') • Manager: Keane • Player of the match: Bence Ötvös, Ferencváros 8.1 • Best player of Zalaegerszeg: Daniel 7.6

23 February 2026 23	MTK	1–3	Ferencváros	Budapest
20:00 CET	Szépe (yellow card) 41'; H. Németh (yellow card) 69'; K. Németh (yellow card) 72'; Beriashvili (yellow card) 79'; Jurek 87'	Report	Kovačević 34'; Corbu (yellow card) 39'; Acolatse 57'; Madarász 74'; Osváth (yellow card) 76'	Stadium: Hidegkuti Nándor Stadion; Attendance: 4,872; Referee: Gergő Bogár; Assistant referees: Norbert Bornemissza, István Szécsényi
Note: • Ferencváros: Á. Varga — Szalai, Raemaekers, Gómez (Makreckis (substituted on) 71') — Acolatse (Rommens (substituted on) 78'), Romão, Zachariassen (c) (O'Dowda (substituted on) 78'), Corbu (Madarász (substituted on) 64'), Osváth — Gruber, Kovačević (Yusuf (substituted on) 64') • Manager: Keane • Player of the match: Elton Acolatse, Ferencváros 8.2 • Best player of MTK: Gábor Jurek 7.7

1 March 2026 24	Ferencváros	2–1	Kazincbarcika	Budapest
18:45 CET	Yusuf (yellow card) 87'; Kovačević (penalty missed) 87' 87'; Levi 90+4'		Rácz (yellow card) 38'; Könyves 60' (yellow card) 86'; Berecz (yellow card) 87'; Klausz (yellow card) 90+1'	Stadium: Groupama Aréna; Attendance: 6,913; Referee: Bence Csonka dr. Assistant referees: Vencel Tóth II, Georgiou Theodoros
Note: • Ferencváros: Gróf — Gómez, Raemaekers (c) (Levi (substituted on) 77'), Szalai — Osváth, Kanichowsky, Abu Fani (Joseph (substituted on) 70'), Corbu (Madarász (substituted on) 46'), Acolatse (Yusuf (substituted on) 70') — Gruber (B. Nagy (substituted on) 70'), Kovačević • Manager: Keane • Player of the match: Bence Juhász, Kazincbarcika 8.4 • Best player of Ferencváros: Gábor Szalai 8.1

8 March 2026 25	Nyíregyháza	1–3	Ferencváros	Nyíregyháza
18:30 CET	Kvasina 22'; Toma (yellow card) 59'; Temesvári (yellow card) 78'	Report	Abu Fani 3' (yellow card) 60'; Yusuf 8'; B. Nagy (yellow card) 70'; Gómez 90'	Stadium: Városi Stadion; Attendance: 8,013; Referee: Balázs Berke; Assistant referees: Balázs Buzás, Gergely Becséri
Note: • Ferencváros: Dibusz (c) — Gómez, Raemaekers, Szalai — Osváth, Kanichowsky (Corbu (substituted on) 85'), Madarász, Abu Fani (Zachariassen (substituted on) 65'), B. Nagy (O'Dowda (substituted on) 85') — Joseph (Romão (substituted on) 74'), Yusuf • Manager: Keane • Player of the match: Dániel Kovács, Nyíregyháza 8.6 • Best player of Ferencváros: Mohammed Abu Fani 8.4

22 March 2026 27	Kisvárda	1–1	Ferencváros	Kisvárda
19:15 CET	Cipetić (yellow card) 27'; Melnyk 63'; Mbock (yellow card) 70'; Popovych (yellow card) 81'	Report	Kovačević 15'; Osváth (yellow card) 24'; Madarász (yellow card) 34'; Yusuf (yellow card) 52'	Stadium: Várkerti Stadion; Attendance: 3,150; Referee: Péter Antal; Assistant referees: István Szécsényi, Ákos Berényi
Note:

5 April 2026 28	Debrecen	0–2	Ferencváros	Debrecen
17:00 CEST		Report	Corbu 53', 60'; Szalai (yellow card) 59'; Abu Fani (yellow card) 63'	Stadium: Nagyerdei Stadion; Attendance: 16,876; Referee: Gergő Bogár; Assistant referees: Vencel Tóth II, Balázs Szert
Note: • Ferencváros: Dibusz (c) — Gómez, Raemaekers, Szalai — Madarász, Abu Fani (O'Dowda (substituted on) 76'), Kanichowsky (Romão (substituted on) 90+1'), Corbu, B. Nagy (Gruber (substituted on) 76') — Yusuf (Makreckis (substituted on) 76'), Kovačević (Joseph (substituted on) 82') • Manager: Keane (yellow card) 32' • Player of the match: Marius Corbu, Ferencváros 8.7 • Best player of Debrecen: Tamás Szűcs 7.1

10 April 2026 29	Ferencváros	3–1	Diósgyőr	Budapest
20:00 CEST	Acolatse 51'; Joseph 60'; Gómez 76'	Report	Pető 23' (yellow card) 32'; L. Kastrati (yellow card) 75'; Tamás (yellow card) 87'; Vallejo (yellow card) 90+4'	Stadium: Groupama Aréna; Attendance: 9,417; Referee: Ferenc Karakó; Assistant referees: Gergő Vígh-Tarsonyi, Viktor Nagy
Note: • Ferencváros: Dibusz (c) — Gómez, Raemaekers, Szalai — Osváth, Corbu, Kanichowsky, Abu Fani (Gruber (substituted on) 46'), B. Nagy (Acolatse (substituted on) 46' (substituted off) 80' (O'Dowda (substituted on) 80')) — Yusuf (Joseph (substituted on) 19'), Kovačević (Zachariassen (substituted on) 73') • Manager: Keane • Player of the match: Mariano Gómez, Ferencváros 8.6 • Best player of Diósgyőr: Milán Pető 7.0

14 April 2026 26	Ferencváros	2–1	Puskás Akadémia	Budapest
18:45 CEST	Joseph 42'; Kanichowsky 45'; Gómez (yellow card) 75'	Report	L. Duarte (yellow card) 13'; Lukács 34'; Maceiras (yellow card) 47'; Szolnoki (yellow card) 74'	Stadium: Groupama Aréna; Attendance: 7,155; Referee: Márton Rúsz; Assistant referees: Péter Kóbor, Ákos Berényi
Note: • Ferencváros: Dibusz (c) — Gómez, Raemaekers, Szalai — Osváth (B. Nagy (substituted on) 79'), Corbu, Kanichowsky, O'Dowda (Maceiras (substituted on) 79') — Joseph (Kovačević (substituted on) 72'), Gruber (Lisztes (substituted on) 83'), Zachariassen (Rommens (substituted on) 72') • Manager: Keane • Player of the match: Gabi Kanichowsky, Ferencváros 8.5 • Best player of Puskás Akadémia: Péter Szappanos 7.6

19 April 2026 30	Győr	1–0	Ferencváros	Győr
19:30 CEST	Bánáti 82'; Csinger (yellow card) 90+2'; Petráš (yellow card) 90+3'; Krpić (yellow card) 90+7'	Report	Abu Fani (yellow card) 43'; Osváth (yellow card) 60'; Gómez (yellow card) 88'; Joseph (yellow card) 90+2'; B. Nagy (yellow card) 90+3' (On the bench)	Stadium: ETO Park; Attendance: 8,360; Referee: Balázs Berke; Assistant referees: Vencel Tóth II, Balázs Buzás
Note: • Ferencváros: Dibusz (c) — Gómez, Raemaekers, Szalai — Osváth (Gruber (substituted on) 66'), Corbu, Abu Fani (Makreckis (substituted on) 66'), Kanichowsky, B. Nagy (Lisztes (substituted on) 88') — Kovačević (Zachariassen (substituted on) 58'), Joseph • Manager: Keane • Player of the match: Samuel Petráš, Győri ETO 9.1 • Best player of Ferencváros: Dénes Dibusz 7.8

26 April 2026 31	Ferencváros	2–0	Paks	Budapest
17:00 CEST	Joseph 42', 66'; O'Dowda (yellow card) 32'; Corbu (yellow card) 57' (yellow-red card) 86'	Report	Vécsei (yellow card) 35'; Ádám (yellow card) 46'; Böde (yellow card) 80'; Gyurkits (yellow card) 83'	Stadium: Groupama Aréna; Attendance: 11,127; Referee: Gergő Bogár; Assistant referees: Norbert Bornemissza, Gergely Becséri
Note: • Ferencváros: Dibusz (c) — Gómez, Raemaekers, Szalai — Osváth, Rommens, Kanichowsky, Corbu, Gruber (Lisztes (substituted on) 77') — Joseph (Zachariassen (substituted on) 90'), Kovačević (O'Dowda (substituted on) 14') • Manager: Keane • Player of the match: Gabi Kanichowsky, Ferencváros 8.9 • Best player of Paks: Gábor Vas 6.9

3 May 2026 32	Újpest	0–5	Ferencváros	Budapest
16:00 CEST	G. Bodnár (yellow card) 27'; Fiola (yellow card) 40'; Ljujić (yellow card) 45'; Kr. Horváth (yellow card) 51'; Vlijter (yellow card) 70'	Report	Zachariassen 19'; Szalai (yellow card) 30'; Kanichowsky 40'; Joseph 49', 64'; Abu Fani 90+9'	Stadium: Szusza Ferenc Stadion; Attendance: 10,930; Referee: Bence Csonka dr. Assistant referees: Vencel Tóth II, Georgiou Theodoros

16 May 2026 33	Ferencváros	3–0	Zalaegerszeg	Budapest
17:15 CEST	Victory 57' (o.g.); Gómez (yellow card) 62'; Yusuf 84'; Zachariassen 90+2'	Report	Calderón (yellow card) 90+1'	Stadium: Groupama Aréna; Attendance: 13,157; Referee: Tamás Bognár; Assistant referees: Péter Kóbor, Bence Belicza

Note: Round 26, Ferencváros vs Puskás Akadémia match: the joint request of the two clubs was accepted by the MLSZ (Hungarian Football Federation) Competition Committee, so the Fizz League meeting originally scheduled for 16 March 2026 postponed to 14 April 2026.

=== Magyar Kupa ===
13 September 2025 R64	Szarvaskend (Megyei Bajnokság I)	0–15	Ferencváros	Szarvaskend
16:00 CEST	Cseresnyés (yellow card) 90'	Report	Makreckis 13'; Júlio Romão (yellow card) 25'; Yusuf 30', 57', 73', 85'; Levi 38'; Arzani 42', 52', 67'; Abu Fani 61', 74'; Gólik 64', 76', 87'; Gartenmann 70'	Stadium: Sporttelep; Attendance: 3,500; Referee: Attila Molnár; Assistant referees: Zoltán Horváth, József Aradi
Note: • Ferencváros: Gróf — Makreckis (Cadu (substituted on) 54'), Gartenmann, Cissé (Szalai (substituted on) 69'), B. Nagy (Gólik (substituted on) 54') — Júlio Romão (Madarász (substituted on) 46'), Kanichowsky (Abu Fani (substituted on) 46') — Zachariassen, Levi, Arzani — Yusuf • Manager: Keane

29 October 2025 R32	Ferencváros	4–0	Békéscsaba (NB II)	Budapest
20:00 CET	Joseph 24', 90+2'; Pešić 29'; Zachariassen 45'	Report	Zsolnai (yellow card) 31'	Stadium: Groupama Aréna; Attendance: 6,493; Referee: Balázs Berke; Assistant referees: Norbert Bornemissza, Péter Garai
Note: • Ferencváros: Radnóti — Ötvös (Madarász (substituted on) 46'), Gartenmann (c) (Raemaekers (substituted on) 46'), Szalai — Zachariassen, Levi, Abu Fani (Arzani (substituted on) 71'), Júlio Romão, O'Dowda (Lisztes (substituted on) 63') — Joseph, Pešić (Yusuf (substituted on) 71') • Manager: Keane

11 February 2026 R16	Ferencváros	4–0	Csákvár (NB II)	Budapest
17:30 CET	Joseph 12', 15'; Zachariassen 18'; Cadu 40'	Report	Radics (yellow card) 58'	Stadium: Groupama Aréna; Attendance: 5,167; Referee: Bence Csonka dr. Assistant referees: Balázs Szert, Péter Ország
Note: • Ferencváros: Á. Varga — Makreckis, Lakatos, Szalai (Madarász (substituted on) 62') — Cadu, Levi (Czéh (substituted on) 77'), Júlio Romão, Zachariassen (Rommens (substituted on) 62'), Acolatse (Corbu (substituted on) 62') — Yusuf, Joseph (Gólik (substituted on) 62') • Manager: Keane

4 March 2026 QF	Kazincbarcika (NB I)	0–5	Ferencváros	Miskolc
20:00 CET		Report	Yusuf 21', 41'; Gómez 25'; Joseph 30'; Cadu 45'; Rommens (yellow card) 76'	Stadium: Diósgyőri Stadion; Attendance: 1,164; Referee: Imre Kovács; Assistant referees: Balázs Szert, István Szécsényi
Note: • Ferencváros: Dibusz (c) — Makreckis, Gómez (Botka (substituted on) 64'), Raemaekers (Acolatse (substituted on) 46'), Cadu — Levi, Júlio Romão, Zachariassen (Rommens (substituted on) 64'), O'Dowda — Yusuf (Gólik (substituted on) 46'), Joseph (Kovačević (substituted on) 72') • Manager: Keane

22 April 2026 SF	Ferencváros	2–2 (a.e.t.) (3–2 p)	Győri ETO (NB I)	Budapest
20:00 CEST	Kovačević 5' (yellow card) 15'; O'Dowda (yellow card) 29'; Levi 45+4'; Raemaekers (yellow card) 53'; Gruber (yellow card) 120'	Report	Pyshchur (yellow card) 18'; Csinger 40'; Bumba 45+1'; Vlădoiu (yellow card) 50'; R. Tóth (yellow card) 119'	Stadium: Groupama Aréna; Attendance: 12,122; Referee: Tamás Bognár; Assistant referees: Péter Kóbor, Georgiou Theodoros
	Penalties
	Abu Fani (penalty missed); Gruber (penalty scored); Raemaekers (penalty scored); Joseph (penalty missed); Corbu (penalty scored)		Vitális (penalty missed); Krpić (penalty scored); Štefulj (penalty scored); Benbouali (penalty missed); Gavrić (penalty missed)
Note: • Ferencváros: Dibusz (c) — Makreckis, Gómez, Raemaekers, O'Dowda (Szalai (substituted on) 89') — Levi (Abu Fani (substituted on) 58'), Zachariassen (Corbu (substituted on) 106'), Júlio Romão (Rommens (substituted on) 58') — Cadu (B. Nagy (substituted on) 94'), Kovačević (Gruber (substituted on) 91'), Joseph • Manager: Keane

9 May 2026 F	Ferencváros	1–0 (a.e.t.)	Zalaegerszeg (NB I)	Budapest
18:00 CEST	Szalai (yellow card) 87'; Yusuf (penalty missed) 95'; Raemaekers 111'; Abu Fani (yellow card) 114'	Report	Teixeira (yellow card) 96'; N. Szendrei (yellow card) 100'	Stadium: Puskás Aréna; Attendance: 49,858; Referee: Márton Rúsz; Assistant referees: Balázs Buzás, Gergő Vígh-Tarsonyi

=== UEFA Champions League ===
Champions League squad: • Goalkeepers: Dibusz, Gróf, Őri • Defenders: Cissé, Gartenmann, Kaján, Makreckis, B. Nagy, Raemaekers, Szalai • Midfielders: Keita, Levi, Cadu, Maiga, O’Dowda, Ötvös, Tóth, Zachariassen • Forwards: Arzani, Cirkovic, Joseph, Pesic, B. Varga, Sevikyan

==== Second qualifying round ====
The draw for the Second qualifying round was held on 18 June 2025.

22 July 2025 1st leg	Noah (Armenia)	1–2	(Hungary) Ferencváros	Abovyan, Armenia
18:00 CEST (20:00 AMT)	Gartenmann 36' (o.g.); Grgić (yellow card) 48'; Ferreira (yellow card) 49'	Report	O'Dowda 44'; B. Varga 49'; Cissé (red card) 82'	Stadium: Abovyan City Stadium; Attendance: 2,800; Referee: Ricardo de Burgos (Spain); Assistant referees: Iván Masso Granado, Asier Pérez De Mendiola
Note: • Ferencváros: Dibusz (c) — Gartenmann, Cissé, Ötvös — Makreckis (Szalai (substituted on) 90+1'), Tóth, N. Keïta (Raemaekers (substituted on) 70'), Levi (Maïga (substituted on) 77'), O'Dowda — B. Varga (Pešić (substituted on) 70'), Joseph (Sevikyan (substituted on) 77') • Manager: Robbie Keane • Best player of the match: Callum O'Dowda, Ferencváros 7.9

30 July 2025 2nd leg	Ferencváros (Hungary)	4–3 (6–4 agg.)	(Armenia) Noah	Budapest
20:00 CEST	Pešić 1'; Joseph 12'; Raemaekers (yellow card) 36'; Zachariassen 52' (pen.); B. Varga 74'; O'Dowda (yellow card) 90+1'	Report	Ferreira 7'; Boakye (yellow card) 18'; Aiás 22'; Thórarinsson (yellow card) 29'; Grgić 71'; Sualehe (yellow card) 88'; Sangaré (yellow card) 90+6'	Stadium: Groupama Aréna; Attendance: 17,039; Referee: Robert Jones (England); Assistant referees: Daniel Robathan, Craig Taylor
Note: • Ferencváros: Dibusz (c) — Gartenmann, Raemaekers, Szalai — Makreckis (Cadu (substituted on) 90+3'), Tóth, Ötvös, Levi (Zachariassen (substituted on) 46'), O'Dowda (B. Nagy (substituted on) 90+3') — Joseph (Maïga (substituted on) 78'), Pešić (B. Varga (substituted on) 64') • Manager: Robbie Keane • Best player of the match: Lenny Joseph, Ferencváros 9.2

Ferencváros won 6–4 on aggregate.

==== Third qualifying round ====
6 August 2025 1st leg	Ludogorets Razgrad (Bulgaria)	0–0	(Hungary) Ferencváros	Razgrad, Bulgaria
19:30 (20:30 EEST (UTC+3))	Tekpetey (yellow card) 18'	Report	Ötvös (yellow card) 11'; O'Dowda (yellow card) 63'; Makreckis (yellow card) 71'	Stadium: Huvepharma Arena; Attendance: 6,746; Referee: Espen Eskås (Norway); Assistant referees: Jan Erik Engan, Anders Olav Dale
Note: • Ferencváros: Dibusz (c) — Szalai, Raemaekers, Gartenmann — O'Dowda, Tóth, Ötvös, Kanichowsky (Levi (substituted on) 80'), Makreckis (Cadu (substituted on) 85') — B. Varga (Maïga (substituted on) 72'), Joseph (Gruber (substituted on) 85') • Manager: Robbie Keane • Best player of the match: Toon Raemaekers, Ferencváros 7.7

12 August 2025 2nd leg	Ferencváros (Hungary)	3–0 (3–0 agg.)	(Bulgaria) Ludogorets Razgrad	Budapest
20:15 CEST	B. Varga 38', 79'; Szalai 86'; A. Tóth (yellow card) 90'; Maïga (yellow card) 90+4'	Report	Kurtulus (yellow card) 45'; Kaloč (yellow card) 61'; Chouiar (yellow card) 70'	Stadium: Groupama Aréna; Attendance: 19,111; Referee: Alejandro Hernández Hernández (Spain); Assistant referees: José Naranjo, Marcos Cerdan Aguilar
Note: • Ferencváros: Dibusz (c) — Gartenmann, Raemaekers, Szalai — Makreckis, Tóth, Ötvös (Levi (substituted on) 88'), Kanichowsky (Zachariassen (substituted on) 88'), O'Dowda — Joseph (Gruber (substituted on) 75'), B. Varga (Maïga (substituted on) 80') • Manager: Robbie Keane • Best player of the match: Barnabás Varga, Ferencváros 9.9

Ferencváros won 3–0 on aggregate.

==== Play-off round ====
19 August 2025 1st leg	Ferencváros (Hungary)	1–3	(Azerbaijan) Qarabağ	Budapest
21:00 CEST	B. Varga 29'; Szalai (yellow card) 90+3'; Pešić (yellow card) 90+5'	Report	Janković 50'; Medina 67'; Silva (yellow card) 69'; Gurbanli 85'	Stadium: Groupama Aréna; Attendance: 19,675; Referee: João Pinheiro (Portugal); Assistant referees: Bruno Jesus, Luciano Maia
Note: • Ferencváros: Dibusz (c) — Gartenmann (Cissé (substituted on) 64'), Raemaekers, Szalai — Makreckis, Tóth, Ötvös (Zachariassen (substituted on) 46'), Kanichowsky (Levi (substituted on) 77'), O'Dowda — Joseph (Gruber (substituted on) 70'), B. Varga (Pešić (substituted on) 70') • Manager: Robbie Keane • Best player of the match: Kevin Medina, Qarabağ 8.9 • Best player of Ferencváros: Barnabás Varga 8.2

27 August 2025 2nd leg	Qarabağ (Azerbaijan)	2–3 (5–4 agg.)	(Hungary) Ferencváros	Baku, Azerbaijan
18:45 CEST (20:45 AZT)	Leandro Andrade 25'; Pedro Bicalho (yellow card) 37'; Zoubir 45'; Medina (yellow card) 53'; Silva (yellow card) 81'	Report	Joseph 12'; Kanichowsky (yellow card) 42'; B. Varga 55' (pen.); N. Keïta (yellow card) 56'; Tóth 82'; Cissé (yellow card) 90'	Stadium: Tofiq Bahramov Republican Stadium; Attendance: 29,744; Referee: Clément Turpin (France); Assistant referees: Nicolas Danos, Alexis Auger
Note: • Ferencváros: Dibusz (c) — Makreckis, Cissé, Raemaekers, O'Dowda (B. Nagy (substituted on) 69') — Ötvös (Pešić (substituted on) 46'), N. Keïta (Tóth (substituted on) 74') — Joseph (Gruber (substituted on) 74'), Kanichowsky, Levi (Cadu (substituted on) 46') — B. Varga • Manager: Robbie Keane • Best player of the match: Leandro Andrade, Qarabağ 8.1 • Best player of Ferencváros: Alex Tóth 7.8

Qarabağ won 5–4 on aggregate.

=== UEFA Europa League ===
==== League phase ====
The draw for the league phase pairings will be held at the Grimaldi Forum in Monaco on 29 August 2025, 13:00 CEST, along with the draw for the Europa League league phase.

Opponents:
• home: (Scotland) Rangers, (Czech Republic) Viktoria Plzeň, (Bulgaria) Ludogorets Razgrad and (Greece) Panathinaikos
• away: (Austria) Red Bull Salzburg, (Turkey) Fenerbahçe, (England) Nottingham Forest and (Belgium) Genk

Europa League squad: • Goalkeepers: Dibusz, Gróf, Radnóti*, Z. Tóth* • Defenders: Gartenmann, Cadu, Szalai, Cissé, Raemaekers, Nagy • Midfielders: Keïta, Zachariassen, Ötvös, Makreckis, Kanichowsky, O'Dowda, A. Tóth, Júlio Romão, Madarász* • Forwards: Pešić, Levi, Yusuf, Varga, Gruber, Joseph, Lisztes, Gólik*
Note:* B-list

===== League phase table =====
Pos	Team	Pld	W	D	L	GF	GA	GD	Pts	Qualification
10	(Italian Football Federation) Bologna	8	4	3	1	14	7	+7	15	Advance to knockout phase play-offs (seeded)
11	(German Football Association) VfB Stuttgart	8	5	0	3	15	9	+6	15	Advance to knockout phase play-offs (seeded)
12	(Hungarian Football Federation) Ferencváros	8	4	3	1	12	11	+1	15	Advance to knockout phase play-offs (seeded)
13	(The Football Association) Nottingham Forest	8	4	2	2	15	7	+8	14	Advance to knockout phase play-offs (seeded)
14	(Football Association of the Czech Republic) Viktoria Plzeň	8	3	5	0	8	3	+5	14	Advance to knockout phase play-offs (seeded)

Source: UEFA
Rules for classification: League phase tiebreakers

Schedule source:

Round	1	2	3	4	5	6	7	8
Ground	H	A	A	H	A	H	H	A
Result	D	W	W	W	D	W	D	L
Position	19	11	7	3	6	6	7	12
Points	1	4	7	10	11	14	15	15

Updated to match(es) played on 29 January 2026. Source: UEFA
A = Away; H = Home; W = Win; D = Draw; L = Loss

===== Matches =====
25 September 2025 1	Ferencváros (Hungary)	1–1	(Czech Republic) Viktoria Plzeň	Budapest
21:00 CEST (UTC+2)	Makreckis (yellow card) 10' (yellow-red card) 38'; Cissé (yellow card) 90+1'; Pešić 90+4' (yellow card) 90+5'	Report	Durosinmi (yellow card) 15' (goal) 17'; Jemelka (yellow card) 74'	Stadium: Groupama Aréna; Attendance: 16,117; Referee: Sander van der Eijk (Netherlands); Assistant referees: Rens Bluemink, Stefan De Groot
Note: • Ferencváros: Dibusz (c) — Cissé, Raemaekers, Gartenmann (Joseph (substituted on) 74') — Makreckis, Tóth (Pešić (substituted on) 84'), Ötvös (Levi (substituted on) 84'), N. Keïta (Kanichowsky (substituted on) 46'), O'Dowda — Gruber (Cadu (substituted on) 46'), B. Varga • Manager: Keane • Player of the match: Merchas Doski, Viktoria Plzeň 7.7 • Best player of Ferencváros: Gabi Kanichowsky and Toon Raemaekers 7.5 each

2 October 2025 2	Genk (Belgium)	0–1	(Hungary) Ferencváros	Genk, Belgium
21:00 CEST (UTC+2)		Report	B. Varga 44' (penalty missed) 49' (yellow card) 82'; Cissé (yellow card) 67'; Gartenmann (yellow card) 74'	Stadium: Cegeka Arena; Attendance: 13,743; Referee: Anastasios Sidiropoulos (Greece); Assistant referees: Polychronis Kostaras, Polychronis Kostaras
Note: • Ferencváros: Dibusz (c) — Gartenmann, Raemaekers, Cissé — Cadu, Tóth, N. Keïta (Ötvös (substituted on) 85'), Levi (Kanichowsky (substituted on) 79'), O'Dowda (B. Nagy (substituted on) 53') — B. Varga (Zachariassen (substituted on) 85'), Joseph (Yusuf (substituted on) 79') • Manager: Keane • Player of the match: Hendrik Van Crombrugge, Genk 8.2 • Best player of Ferencváros: Lenny Joseph 7.9

23 October 2025 3	Red Bull Salzburg (Austria)	2–3	(Hungary) Ferencváros	Wals-Siezenheim, Austria
18:45 CEST (UTC+2)	Baidoo 13'; Vertessen 72'	Report	Varga (penalty missed) 22' 50'; Zachariassen 56' (yellow card) 64'; Yusuf 58'; Raemaekers (yellow card) 81'; O'Dowda (yellow card) 90+4'	Stadium: Red Bull Arena; Attendance: 8,342; Referee: Goga Kikacheishvili (Georgia); Assistant referees: David Akhvlediani, Davit Gabisonia
Note: • Ferencváros: Dibusz (c) — Gartenmann, Raemaekers, Cissé — Makreckis, Ötvös, Kanichowsky (N. Keïta (substituted on) 78'), Zachariassen, Cadu (O'Dowda (substituted on) 78') — B. Varga (Levi (substituted on) 84'), Yusuf (Joseph (substituted on) 72') • Manager: Keane • Player of the match: Kristoffer Zachariassen, Ferencváros 8.5 • Best player of Salzburg: Alexander Schlager 7.8

6 November 2025 4	Ferencváros (Hungary)	3–1	(Bulgaria) Ludogorets Razgrad	Budapest
21:00 CET (UTC+1)	Keïta (yellow card) 20'; Kanichowsky 32'; Yusuf (yellow card) 51'; Cadu 53'; Joseph 87'	Report	Almeida (yellow card) 17'; Verdon (yellow card) 56'; Marcus (yellow card) 65'; Son 78'	Stadium: Groupama Aréna; Attendance: 18,789; Referee: Mohammed Al-Hakim (Sweden); Assistant referees: Mehmet Culum, Fredrik Klyver
Note: • Ferencváros: Dibusz (c) — Cissé, Raemaekers, Szalai — Makreckis, N. Keïta (Tóth (substituted on) 46'), Kanichowsky (Ötvös (substituted on) 80'), Zachariassen (Romão (substituted on) 67'), Cadu — Pešić (B. Varga (substituted on) 80'), Yusuf (Joseph (substituted on) 63') • Manager: Keane • Player of the match: Cadu, Ferencváros 8.1 • Best player of Ludogorets Razgrad: Son 7.0

27 November 2025 5	Fenerbahçe (Turkey)	1–1	(Hungary) Ferencváros	Istanbul, Turkey
18:45 CET (UTC+1)	Efe Demir (yellow card) 21'; Talisca 69' (yellow card) 90+6'; Škriniar (yellow card) 73'; Semedo (yellow card) 80'; Durán (red card) 90+1'	Report	Zachariassen (yellow card) 42'; Szalai (yellow card) 55'; B. Varga 66'; O'Dowda (yellow card) 70'; Raemaekers (yellow card) 90+2'	Stadium: Şükrü Saracoğlu Stadium; Attendance: 37,898; Referee: Ricardo de Burgos Bengoetxea (Spain); Assistant referees: Iker De Francisco, Asier Pérez De Mendiola
Note: • Ferencváros: Dibusz (c) — Cissé, Raemaekers, Szalai — Makreckis, Kanichowsky (Ötvös (substituted on) 81'), N. Keïta (Romão (substituted on) 81'), Zachariassen (Tóth (substituted on) 60'), Cadu (O'Dowda (substituted on) 60') — B. Varga, Yusuf (Joseph (substituted on) 74') • Manager: Keane • Player of the match: Anderson Talisca, Fenerbahçe 8.3 • Best player of Ferencváros: Barnabás Varga and Naby Keïta 7.5 each

11 December 2025 6	Ferencváros (Hungary)	2–1	(Scotland) Rangers	Budapest
18:45 CET (UTC+1)	Ötvös 45+5'; B. Varga 72'; Joseph (yellow card) 77'	Report	Miovski 27'; Aarons (yellow card) 43'; Djiga (yellow card) 79'	Stadium: Groupama Aréna; Attendance: 19,567; Referee: Anastasios Papapetrou (Greece); Assistant referees: Tryfon Petropoulos, Iordanis Aptosoglou
Note: • Ferencváros: Gróf — Cissé (c), Raemaekers, Szalai — Makreckis, Tóth, Kanichowsky (Romão (substituted on) 83'), Ötvös (Zachariassen (substituted on) 74'), O'Dowda (Cadu (substituted on) 83') — Yusuf (Joseph (substituted on) 74'), B. Varga (Pešić (substituted on) 90') • Manager: Keane • Player of the match: Barnabás Varga, Ferencváros 8.4 • Best player of Rangers: Bojan Miovski 7.7

22 January 2026 7	Ferencváros (Hungary)	1–1	(Greece) Panathinaikos	Budapest
21:00 CET (UTC+1)	Yusuf 62' (pen.); Raemaekers (yellow card) 79'; Romão (yellow card) 90+5'	Report	Bakasetas (yellow card) 40'; Zaroury 86'; Świderski (yellow card) 90'	Stadium: Groupama Aréna; Attendance: 17,879; Referee: Mykola Balakin (Ukraine); Assistant referees: Oleksandr Berkut, Viktor Matyash
Note: • Ferencváros: Gróf — Cissé (c), Raemaekers, Szalai (Madarász (substituted on) 87') — Makreckis, Kanichowsky, Romão, Zachariassen, Cadu — Levi (Ötvös (substituted on) 73'), Yusuf (Joseph (substituted on) 80') • Manager: Keane • Player of the match: Anass Zaroury, Panathinaikos 7.9 • Best player of Ferencváros: Dávid Gróf 7.0

29 January 2026 8	Nottingham Forest (England)	4–0	(Hungary) Ferencváros	Nottinghamshire, England
21:00 CET (20:00 UTC+0)	Ötvös 17' (o.g.); Igor Jesus 21', 55'; Domínguez (yellow card) 76'; McAtee 90' (pen.)	Report	Ötvös (yellow card) 88'	Stadium: City Ground; Attendance: 26,304; Referee: Sebastian Gishamer (Austria); Assistant referees: Roland Riedel, Santino Schreiner
Note: • Ferencváros: Gróf — Cissé (c), Ötvös, Szalai — Makreckis, Levi (Joseph (substituted on) 46'), Romão (Gólik (substituted on) 90'), Kanichowsky (N. Keïta (substituted on) 73'), Cadu — Yusuf (Gruber (substituted on) 73'), Zachariassen (Madarász (substituted on) 84') • Manager: Keane • Player of the match: James McAtee, Nottingham Forest 9.6 • Best player of Ferencváros: Dávid Gróf 8.7

==== Knockout phase ====
===== Play-off =====
19 February 2026 1st leg	Ludogorets Razgrad (Bulgaria)	2–1	(Hungary) Ferencváros	Razgrad, Bulgaria
21:00 CET (22:00 UTC+2)	Nogueira (yellow card) 4'; Duah 24'; Dinis Almeida (yellow card) 52'; Naressi (yellow card) 56'; Son 67'	Report	Yusuf 27'; Abu Fani (yellow card) 38'; Cadu (yellow card) 58'; O'Dowda (yellow card) 78'; Makreckis (yellow card) 83'	Stadium: Huvepharma Arena; Attendance: 3,145; Referee: Tobias Stieler (Germany); Assistant referees: Lasse Koslowski, Mark Borsch
Note: • Ferencváros: Gróf — Cissé (c), Gómez, Raemaekers — Makreckis, Ötvös (Romão (substituted on) 61'), Kanichowsky, Abu Fani (Zachariassen (substituted on) 75'), Cadu (O'Dowda (substituted on) 75') — Yusuf (Gruber (substituted on) 86'), Kovačević (Joseph (substituted on) 75') • Manager: Keane • Player of the match: Son, Ludogorets Razgrad 8.1 • Best player of Ferencváros: Bamidele Yusuf 7.6

26 February 2026 2nd leg	Ferencváros (Hungary)	2–0 (3–2 agg.)	(Bulgaria) Ludogorets Razgrad	Budapest
18:45 CET (UTC+1)	Kanichowsky (yellow card) 9' (goal) 14'; Zachariassen 31'; Raemaekers (yellow card) 52'; Gómez (yellow card) 74'; Gróf (yellow card) 80'; Joseph (yellow card) 90+3'	Report	Naressi (yellow card) 31'; Stanić (yellow card) 74'; Nedyalkov (yellow card) 81'	Stadium: Groupama Aréna; Attendance: 17,989; Referee: Chris Kavanagh (England); Assistant referees: Dan Cook, Ian Hussin
Note: • Ferencváros: Gróf — Cissé (c) (Szalai (substituted on) 68'), Raemaekers, Gómez — Makreckis, Kanichowsky, Abu Fani (Romão (substituted on) 68'), Ötvös (Zachariassen (substituted on) 17'), Cadu — Joseph (Madarász (substituted on) 90+3'), Yusuf • Manager: Keane • Player of the match: Lenny Joseph, Ferencváros 9.3 • Best player of Ludogorets Razgrad: Hendrik Bonmann 8.1

Ferencváros won 3–2 on aggregate.

===== Round of 16 =====
12 March 2026 1st leg	Ferencváros (Hungary)	2–0	(Portugal) Braga	Budapest
21:00 CET (UTC+1)	Zachariassen (yellow card) 25'; Kanichowsky 32'; Joseph 69'	Report	Arrey-Mbi (yellow card) 61'; Moscardo (yellow card) 74'	Stadium: Groupama Aréna; Attendance: 19,859; Referee: Nick Walsh (Scotland); Assistant referees: Francis Connor, Daniel McFarlane
Note: • Ferencváros: Gróf — Cissé (c), Raemaekers, Gómez — Makreckis, Kanichowsky, Abu Fani (Madarász (substituted on) 90'), Zachariassen, O'Dowda — Yusuf (Kovačević (substituted on) 90+3'), Joseph (Júlio Romão (substituted on) 84') • Manager: Keane • Player of the match: Lenny Joseph, Ferencváros 8.2 • Best player of Braga: Bright Arrey-Mbi 7.2

18 March 2026 2nd leg	Braga (Portugal)	4–0 (4–2 agg.)	(Hungary) Ferencváros	Braga, Portugal
16:30 CET (15:30 UTC+0)	Horta 11', 53'; Grillitsch 15'; Martínez 34'; Gómez (yellow card) 59'; Lagerbielke (yellow card) 66'; Pau Victor (yellow card) 71'; Zalazar (yellow card) 75'; Moscardo (yellow card) 80'	Report	Júlio Romão (yellow card) 88'	Stadium: Estádio Municipal de Braga; Attendance: 15,078; Referee: Glenn Nyberg (Sweden); Assistant referees: Mahbod Beigi, Andreas Söderkvist
Note: • Ferencváros: Gróf — Cissé (c), Raemaekers, Gómez – Makreckis, Kanichowsky (N. Keïta (substituted on) 77'), Júlio Romão, Abu Fani (Kovačević (substituted on) 59'), O'Dowda – Yusuf (Cadu (substituted on) 77'), Joseph (Gruber (substituted on) 71') • Manager: Keane • Player of the match: Ricardo Horta, Braga 8.7 • Best player of Ferencváros: Júlio Romão 7.2

Braga won 4–2 on aggregate.

== See also ==
- List of Ferencvárosi TC seasons
- Ferencvárosi TC in European football
- Ferencvárosi TC–Újpest FC rivalry: local derby between Ferencváros and Újpest
- Örökrangadó: local derby between Ferencváros and MTK Budapest
