= Krisztián Lisztes (footballer, born 2005) =

Hungarian footballer

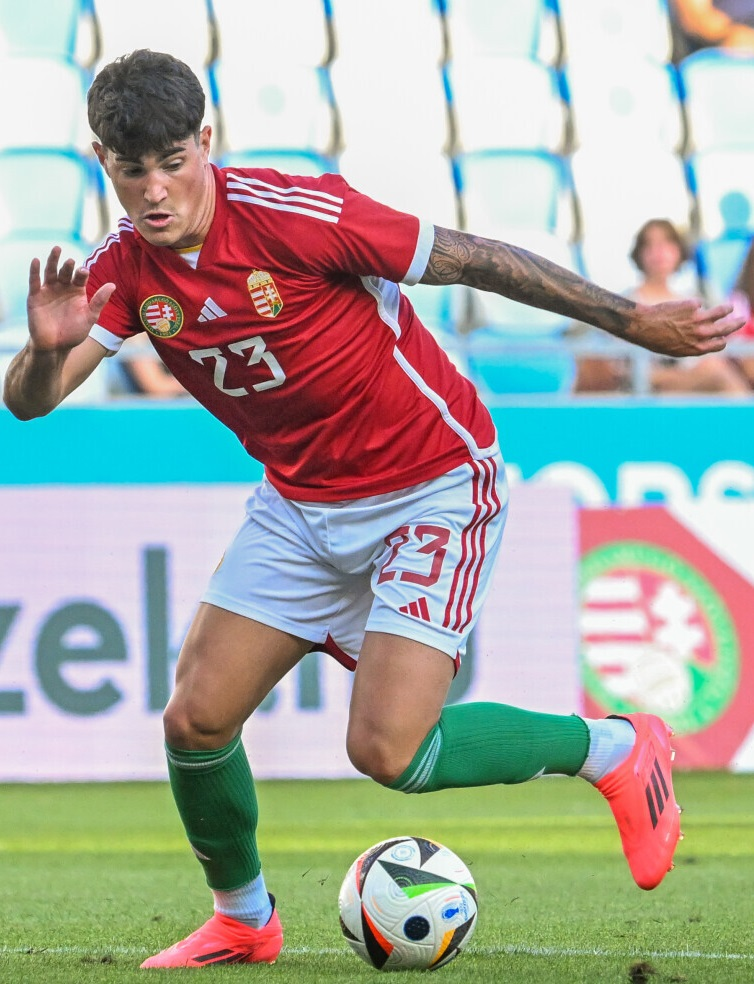
- Lisztes playing for Hungary U21 in 2024

Personal information
- Date of birth: 6 May 2005 (age 21)
- Place of birth: Budapest, Hungary
- Height: 1.83 m (6 ft 0 in)
- Position: Midfielder

Team information
- Current team: Ferencváros (on loan from Eintracht Frankfurt)
- Number: 76

Youth career
- 2011–2013: Újpesti Haladás FK
- 2013–2014: Dalnoki Akadémia
- 2014–2015: Mészöly Focisuli
- 2015–2017: MTK Budapest
- 2017: Soroksár
- 2017–2022: Ferencváros

Senior career*
Years	Team	Apps	(Gls)
2022–2024	Ferencváros	27	(12)
2022–2023	→ Soroksár (loan)	18	(3)
2024–	Eintracht Frankfurt	0	(0)
2024–2025	Eintracht Frankfurt II	3	(0)
2025–	→ Ferencváros	10	(2)

International career^{‡}
2021–2022	Hungary U17	6	(2)
2022	Hungary U19	4	(0)
2023–	Hungary U21	10	(1)
- * Club domestic league appearances and goals as of 31 August 2026 ‡ National team caps and goals as of 11 September 2024

Krisztián Lisztes (born 6 May 2005) is a Hungarian professional footballer who plays as a midfielder for Nemzeti Bajnokság I club Ferencváros, on loan from Bundesliga club Eintracht Frankfurt.

== Club career ==
Lisztes is a youth product of the academies of Újpesti Haladás FK, Dalnoki Akadémia, Mészöly Focisuli, MTK Budapest, Soroksár and Ferencváros.

=== Ferencváros ===
He signed his first professional contract in July 2021. He made his professional debut as a late substitute with Ferencváros in a 2–1 Nemzeti Bajnokság I win over Gyirmót on 14 May 2022. He spent the 2022–23 season on loan with their partner club Soroksár in the Nemzeti Bajnokság II.

On 10 January 2023, he signed his first professional contract with Ferencváros.

On 1 May 2023, he scored the winning goal against Ferencváros' archrival Újpest at the Szusza Ferenc Stadion in the Ferencvárosi TC–Újpest FC rivalry match.

On 5 May 2023, he won the 2022–23 Nemzeti Bajnokság I with Ferencváros, after Kecskemét lost 1–0 to Honvéd on the 30th matchday

On 6 August 2023, he scored his first goal in the 2023–24 Nemzeti Bajnokság I season against Fehérvár FC at the Sóstói Stadion.

On 8 October 2023, he was sent off in a 2–2 draw against Debreceni VSC.

On 20 April 2024, the Ferencváros–Kisvárda tie ended with a goalless draw at the Groupama Aréna on the 29th match day of the 2023–24 Nemzeti Bajnokság I season which meant that Ferencváros won their 35th championship.

On 15 May 2024, Ferencváros were defeated by Paks 2–0 in the 2024 Magyar Kupa Final at the Puskás Aréna.

On 19 May 2024, he scored a goal in a 2–0 victory over arch-rival Újpest.

At the end of the 2023–24 Nemzeti Bajnokság I season, he left the club.

=== Eintracht Frankfurt ===
On 5 September 2023, Eintracht Frankfurt announced that they had secured Lisztes from summer 2024, on a contract until 2029.

==== Return to Ferencváros ====
On 8 August 2025, Lisztes returned on loan to Ferencváros. On 9 May 2026, he won the 2025–26 Magyar Kupa season with Ferencváros by beating Zalaegerszegi TE 1–0 in the 2026 Magyar Kupa final at Puskás Aréna. On 27 August 2026, he scored the fourth goal in a 4–0 victory over Trabzonspor in the 2026–27 UEFA Europa League qualifying play-off match at the Groupama Arena.

On 30 August 2026, he scored his first goal in the 2026–27 Nemzeti Bajnokság I season in a 2–1 victory over Puskás Akadémia FC at the Pancho Aréna.

== International career ==
Lisztes is a youth international for Hungary, having played up to the Hungary U19s.

== Personal life ==
Lisztes is the son of the retired Hungarian footballer with the same name, Krisztián Lisztes Sr.

== Style of play ==
He is an attacking forward. He was listed among Players to watch out for in 2024 by Uefa.com.

== Career statistics ==
As of match played 11 November 2024

Club	Season	League			National cup		Europe		Total	
Club	Season	Division	Apps	Goals	Apps	Goals	Apps	Goals	Apps	Goals
Ferencváros	2021–22	Nemzeti Bajnokság I	1	0	—		—		1	0
Ferencváros	2022–23	Nemzeti Bajnokság I	9	5	0	0	2 (Note: Appearances in UEFA Europa League)	0	11	5
Ferencváros	2023–24	Nemzeti Bajnokság I	20	8	3	2	11 (Note: Two appearances in UEFA Champions League, nine appearances in UEFA Conference League)	0	34	10
Ferencváros	Total		30	13	3	2	13	0	46	15
Soroksár (loan)	2021–22	Nemzeti Bajnokság II	1	0	—		—		1	0
Soroksár (loan)	2022–23	Nemzeti Bajnokság II	17	3	—		—		17	3
Soroksár (loan)	Total		18	3	—		—		18	3
Eintracht Frankfurt II	2024–25	Regionalliga Südwest	3	0	—		—		3	0
Ferencváros (loan)	2025–26	Nemzeti Bajnokság I	0	0	—		—		0	0
Career total			51	16	3	2	13	0	67	18

== Honours ==
Ferencvárosi TC

- Nemzeti Bajnokság I: 2021–22, 2022–23, 2023–24
