= Lenny Joseph =

Haitian footballer (born 2000)

Personal information
- Date of birth: 12 October 2000 (age 26)
- Place of birth: Paris, France
- Height: 1.83 m (6 ft 0 in)
- Position: Forward

Team information
- Current team: Ferencváros
- Number: 75

Senior career*
Years	Team	Apps	(Gls)
2018–2019	Le Puy	1	(0)
2019–2020	Boulogne II	12	(1)
2020–2021	Le Puy	4	(2)
2021–2023	Metz II	14	(8)
2021–2023	Metz	37	(3)
2023–2025	Grenoble	52	(5)
2025–	Ferencváros	37	(11)

International career^{‡}
2026–	Haiti	5	(1)
- * Club domestic league appearances and goals as of 13:30, 21 August 2026 (UTC) ‡ National team caps and goals as of 25 June 2026

Lenny Joseph (born 12 October 2000) is a Haitian professional footballer who plays as a forward for Hungarian club Ferencváros. Born in France, he plays for the Haiti national team.

== Club career ==
=== Early career ===
Joseph began his senior career with Le Puy and the reserves of Boulogne. After strong performances in the 2020–21 Coupe de France, he signed a professional contract with FC Metz in the summer of 2021. He made his professional debut with Metz in a 3–3 Ligue 1 tie with Lille 8 August 2021.

=== Ferencváros ===
On 20 January 2025, Joseph was signed by Hungarian League club Ferencvárosi TC. On 9 May 2026, he won the 2025–26 Magyar Kupa season with Ferencváros by beating Zalaegerszegi TE 1–0 in the 2026 Magyar Kupa final at Puskás Aréna.

== International career ==
Joseph was born in France to a Haitian father and DR Congolese mother. He was thus eligible to represent either France or Haiti in international matches. In May 2026, he was called up for the 2026 FIFA World Cup to represent the Haiti national team. He said in an interview with Fradi.hu that a dream would come true if he could play at the World Cup. He scored in his first match for Haiti, a friendly game won 4-0 against New Zealand. Another goal could have come in a 4–2 loss against Morocco in the 2026 FIFA World Cup, but the goal was announced to be an own goal by Yassine Bounou. It is highly debated whether it was a goal or an own goal by fans. So far, Haitian top scorer in a World Cup final tournament is still Emmanuel Sanon.

== Career statistics ==
=== Club ===
As of match played 20 August 2026

Appearances and goals by club, season and competition
Club	Season	League			Magyar Kupa		Europe		Total	
Club	Season	Division	Apps	Goals	Apps	Goals	Apps	Goals	Apps	Goals
Ferencváros	2024–25	NB I	10	4	3	2	–		13	6
Ferencváros	2025–26	NB I	25	7	5	5	18 (Note: Six appearances and two goals in UEFA Champions League, twelve appearances and two goals in UEFA Europa League)	4	48	16
Ferencváros	2026–27	NB I	2	0	0	0	7 (Note: Appearances in UEFA Europa League)	4	9	4
Career total			37	11	8	7	25	8	70	26

=== International ===
As of match played 24 June 2026

Appearances and goals by national team and year
National team	Year	Apps	Goals
Haiti	2026	5	1
Total		5	1

Scores and results list Haiti's goal tally first, score column indicates score after each Joseph goal.

List of international goals scored by Lenny Joseph
No.	Date	Venue	Opponent	Score	Result	Competition
1	2 June 2026	Inter Miami CF Stadium, Fort Lauderdale, United States	New Zealand	2–0	4–0	Friendly

== Honours ==
Ferencvárosi TC

- Nemzeti Bajnokság I: 2024–25
- Magyar Kupa: 2025–26
