= Edgar Sevikyan =

Armenian footballer (born 2001)

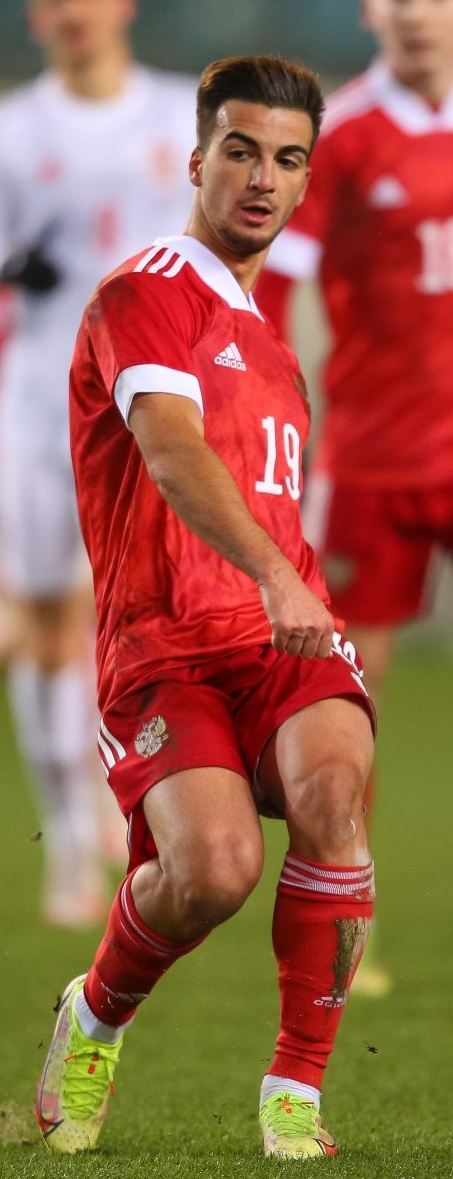
- Sevikyan with Russia U21 in 2021

Personal information
- Full name: Edgar Martirosovich Sevikyan
- Date of birth: 8 August 2001 (age 25)
- Place of birth: Moscow, Russia
- Height: 1.75 m (5 ft 9 in)
- Position: Winger

Team information
- Current team: Ceuta (on loan from Ferencváros)
- Number: 19

Youth career
- 2006–2017: Lokomotiv Moscow
- 2017–2020: Levante

Senior career*
| Years | Team | Apps | (Gls) |
| 2020–2022 | Levante B | 44 | (4) |
| 2020–2022 | Levante | 1 | (0) |
| 2022–2023 | Pari Nizhny Novgorod | 28 | (4) |
| 2024– | Ferencváros | 14 | (1) |
| 2024–2025 | → Lokomotiv Moscow (loan) | 14 | (0) |
| 2025–2026 | → Akron Tolyatti (loan) | 13 | (0) |
| 2026– | → Ceuta (loan) | 2 | (0) |

International career^{‡}
| 2016 | Russia U15 | 6 | (0) |
| 2016–2017 | Russia U16 | 12 | (8) |
| 2017–2018 | Russia U17 | 9 | (1) |
| 2018 | Russia U18 | 5 | (0) |
| 2019–2020 | Russia U19 | 7 | (2) |
| 2019 | Russia U20 | 4 | (3) |
| 2021 | Russia U21 | 4 | (0) |
| 2023– | Armenia | 25 | (2) |
- * Club domestic league appearances and goals as of 20 September 2026 ‡ National team caps and goals as of 12 November 2026

Edgar Martirosovich Sevikyan (Armenian: Էդգար Սևիկյան; Russian: Эдгар Мартиросович Севикян; born 8 August 2001) is a professional footballer who plays as a left winger for Segunda División club Ceuta, on loan from Hungarian club Ferencváros. Born in Russia, he plays for the Armenia national team.

== Club career ==
Born in Moscow with Armenian descent, Sevikyan joined Levante UD's youth setup in 2017 from FC Lokomotiv Moscow, after travelling to the city of Valencia to visit his mother, sister and brother.

On 22 June 2019, while still a youth, he signed his first professional contract after agreeing to a three-year deal. Sevikyan made his senior debut with the reserves on 19 January 2020, coming on as a second-half substitute for Álex Blesa in a 0–1 Segunda División B away loss against CE Sabadell. He was handed his first start seven days later, and scored his team's second in a 3–1 away defeat of Hércules. Sevikyan made his professional – and La Liga – debut on 5 December 2020, replacing goalscorer Jorge de Frutos late into a 3–0 home win against Getafe CF.

On 6 July 2022, Sevikyan signed a three-year contract with Russian Premier League club Pari Nizhny Novgorod. He made his RPL debut for Pari NN on 9 October 2022 against FC Torpedo Moscow.

=== Ferencváros ===
On 17 January 2024, Sevikyan signed with Ferencváros in Hungary.

On 24 April 2024, he scored the winning goal against Nyíregyháza Spartacus FC in the semi final of the 2023–24 Magyar Kupa season On 20 April 2024, the Ferencváros–Kisvárda tie ended with a goalless draw at the Groupama Aréna on the 29th match day of the 2023–24 Nemzeti Bajnokság I season which meant that Ferencváros won their 35th championship.

On 15 May 2024, Ferencváros were defeated by Paks 2–0 in the 2024 Magyar Kupa Final at the Puskás Aréna.

==== Loan to Lokomotiv Moscow ====
On 6 September 2024, Sevikyan returned to his childhood club Lokomotiv Moscow on a season-long loan with an option to buy. The option was not exercised and he left Lokomotiv on 19 June 2025.

==== Loan to Akron Tolyatti ====
On 10 September 2025, Akron Tolyatti announced the signing of Sevikyan on a one-season loan with an option to buy. He left Akron as his loan expired on 9 June 2026.

==== Loan to Ceuta ====
On 1 September 2026, Sevikyan returned to Spain and joined Segunda División side Ceuta on a one-year loan deal.

== International career ==
Sevikyan represented Russia from the under-15 to the under-20 levels. At the time it was unclear where Sevikyan would play in his senior national career. Having talks with both the Armenian and Russian federations he stated that he still needed time to decide. He made his debut for Russian under-21 team on 3 September 2021 in a Under-21 Euro qualifier against Spain that Russia lost 1–4.

Sevikyan was first called up to the Russia national football team for a training camp in September 2023. On 31 August 2023, Sevikyan issued a statement saying he decided to represent Armenia national football team instead. He made his debut for Armenia on 12 October 2023 in a Euro 2024 qualifier against Latvia.

== Career statistics ==
As of match played 4 April 2026

Appearances and goals by club, season and competition
| Club | Season | League | | | Cup | | Continental | | Other | | Total | |
| Club | Season | Division | Apps | Goals | Apps | Goals | Apps | Goals | Apps | Goals | Apps | Goals |
|---|---|---|---|---|---|---|---|---|---|---|---|---|
| Levante B | 2019–20 | Segunda Federación | 8 | 1 | – | | – | | – | | 8 | 1 |
| Levante B | 2020–21 | Segunda Federación | 23 | 2 | – | | – | | – | | 23 | 2 |
| Levante B | 2021–22 | Segunda Federación | 13 | 1 | – | | – | | – | | 13 | 1 |
| Levante B | Total | | 44 | 4 | 0 | 0 | 0 | 0 | – | | 44 | 4 |
| Levante | 2020–21 | La Liga | 1 | 0 | 1 | 0 | – | | – | | 2 | 0 |
| Pari NN | 2022–23 | Russian Premier League | 10 | 0 | 4 | 0 | – | | 2 (Note: Appearances in relegation play-offs) | 1 | 16 | 1 |
| Pari NN | 2023–24 | Russian Premier League | 18 | 4 | 6 | 3 | – | | – | | 24 | 7 |
| Pari NN | Total | | 28 | 4 | 10 | 3 | – | | 2 | 1 | 40 | 8 |
| Ferencváros | 2023–24 | NB I | 12 | 1 | 4 | 1 | 0 | 0 | – | | 16 | 2 |
| Ferencváros | 2024–25 | NB I | 0 | 0 | 0 | 0 | 1 (Note: Appearances in the UEFA Champions League) | 0 | – | | 1 | 0 |
| Ferencváros | 2025–26 | NB I | 1 | 0 | 0 | 0 | 1 | 0 | – | | 2 | 0 |
| Ferencváros | Total | | 13 | 1 | 4 | 1 | 2 | 0 | 0 | 0 | 19 | 2 |
| Lokomotiv Moscow (loan) | 2024–25 | Russian Premier League | 14 | 0 | 6 | 0 | – | | – | | 20 | 0 |
| Akron Tolyatti (loan) | 2025–26 | Russian Premier League | 13 | 0 | 2 | 0 | – | | – | | 15 | 0 |
| Career total | | | 113 | 9 | 23 | 4 | 2 | 0 | 2 | 1 | 140 | 14 |

=== International ===
As of match played 12 November 2026

Appearances and goals by national team and year
| National team | Year | Apps | Goals |
|---|---|---|---|
| Armenia | 2023 | 4 | 0 |
| Armenia | 2024 | 9 | 1 |
| Armenia | 2025 | 7 | 1 |
| Armenia | 2026 | 5 | 0 |
| Total | | 25 | 2 |

=== International goals ===
Scores and results list Armenia's goal tally first.

List of international goals scored by Edgar Sevikyan
| No. | Date | Venue | Opponent | Score | Result | Competition |
|---|---|---|---|---|---|---|
| 1 | 26 March 2024 | epet Arena, Prague, Czech Republic | Czech Republic | 1–0 | 1–2 | Friendly |
| 2 | 23 March 2025 | Boris Paichadze Dinamo Arena, Tbilisi, Georgia | Georgia | 1–5 | 1–6 | 2024–25 UEFA Nations League promotion/relegation play-offs |

== Honours ==
Ferencváros

- Nemzeti Bajnokság I: 2023–24
