= Gábor Szalai =

Hungarian footballer (born 2000)

Personal information
- Full name: Gábor Sándor Szalai
- Date of birth: 9 June 2000 (age 26)
- Place of birth: Kecskemét, Hungary
- Height: 1.91 m (6 ft 3 in)
- Position: Centre back

Team information
- Current team: Marítimo (on loan from Ferencváros)
- Number: 22

Youth career
- 2010–2017: Kecskemét
- 2017–2019: Brooke House Academy

Senior career*
Years	Team	Apps	(Gls)
2019–2024	Kecskemét	114	(21)
2024	Lausanne-Sport	16	(0)
2024–	Ferencváros	45	(6)
2026–	→ Marítimo (loan)	2	(0)

International career^{‡}
2025–	Hungary	1	(0)
- * Club domestic league appearances and goals as of 5 September 2026 ‡ National team caps and goals as of 6 June 2025

Gábor Szalai (born 9 June 2000) is a Hungarian footballer who plays as a defender for Primeira Liga club Marítimo, on loan from Nemzeti Bajnokság I club Ferencváros.

== Club career ==
=== Kecskemét ===
Szalai joined the football academy of Kecskemét in 2010. He has been playing for the club's first team since the 2019–20 season. On 24 June 2022, he renewed his contract with Kecskemét.

==== 2022–23 season ====
On 8 April 2023, he scored his first goal in the 2022–23 Nemzeti Bajnokság I season against Puskás Akadémia FC in a 3–0 victory at the Pancho Aréna, Felcsút. On 28 April 2023, he scored a goal in a 3–2 defeat against Paksi FC at the Széktói Stadion on game week 29. On 13 May 2023, he scored his third goal in the season in a 2–0 victory against reigning champions Ferencvárosi TC on game week 31.

==== 2023–24 season ====
On 7 August 2023, he scored his first goal in a 3–1 victory over Kisvárda FC in the 2023–24 Nemzeti Bajnokság I season at the Széktói Stadion. On 13 August 2023, he scored the winning goal against Fehérvár FC at the Széktói Stadion. He scored his third goal in Szusza Ferenc Stadion on 21 October 2023 in 5–3 defeat against Újpest FC on game week 10. On 26 November 2023, he scored his fourth goal in the season in a 3–3 draw against Fehérvár FC at the Sóstói Stadion. On 4 January 2023, it was rumored that the club received an offer from a club to purchase his rights to play.

=== Lausanne ===
On 7 January 2024, he was signed by Swiss Super League club FC Lausanne-Sport. On 20 January 2024, he debuted in a 1–0 defeat against FC St. Gallen at the Stade de la Tuilière. On 28 January 2024, he received a yellow card in a 2–1 defeat against Luzern at the Swissporarena in the 2023–24 Swiss Super League season.

=== Ferencváros ===
On 31 August 2024, he was signed by Nemzeti Bajnokság club Ferencvárosi TC. On 12 April 2025, he scored his first goal in a 2–0 victory over Zalaegerszegi TE at the ZTE Arena in the 2024–25 Nemzeti Bajnokság I season. On 27 April 2025, he scored his second goal in a 3–2 victory over MTK Budapest FC at the Hidegkuti Nándor Stadion. On 10 May 2025, he also scored an important goal in a 3–2 away victory over Paksi FC.

Szalai won the 2024–25 Nemzeti Bajnokság I season with Ferencváros after beating Győr 2–1 at the ETO Park on the last match day on 24 May 2025.

==== 2025–26 season ====
On 12 August 2025, he scored a goal in a 3–0 victory over PFC Ludogorets Razgrad at the Groupama Aréna in the third round of the 2025–26 UEFA Champions League qualifying.

On 19 December 2025, he scored a goal in a 1–0 victory over Diósgyőri VTK at the Diósgyőri Stadion. On 9 May 2026, he won the 2025–26 Magyar Kupa season with Ferencváros by beating Zalaegerszegi TE 1–0 in the 2026 Magyar Kupa final at Puskás Aréna.

==== Loan to Marítimo ====
On 24 July 2026, Szalai moved on loan to Marítimo in Portugal.

== International career ==
In an interview with Nemzeti Sport, he said that he was surprised that Marco Rossi invited him to join the national team. At the press conference of the national team in Telki, he said that he had stage fright to some extent but he could sleep well before joining the national team. He said that the community of the national team is really good and the team will accept him.

He was called up in the Hungary national football team against Serbia national football team.

== Career statistics ==
=== Club ===
As of match played 19 December 2025

Appearances and goals by club, season and competition
Club	Season	League			National cup (Note: Includes Magyar Kupa)		Continental		Total	
Club	Season	Division	Apps	Goals	Apps	Goals	Apps	Goals	Apps	Goals
Kecskemét	2019–20	Nemzeti Bajnokság III	11	0	2	1	—		13	1
Kecskemét	2020–21	Nemzeti Bajnokság III	29	4	2	0	—		31	4
Kecskemét	2021–22	Nemzeti Bajnokság II	30	10	3	0	—		33	10
Kecskemét	2022–23	Nemzeti Bajnokság I	29	3	1	0	—		30	3
Kecskemét	2023–24	Nemzeti Bajnokság I	15	4	2	0	2 (Note: Appearances in UEFA Europa Conference League)	0	19	4
Kecskemét	Total		114	21	10	1	2	0	127	22
Lausanne-Sport	2023–24	Swiss Super League	12	0	—		—		12	0
Lausanne-Sport	2024–25	Swiss Super League	2	0	0	0	—		2	0
Lausanne-Sport	Total		18	0	0	0	—		18	0
Ferencváros	2024–25	Nemzeti Bajnokság I	13	4	4	0	1 (Note: Appearances in UEFA Europa League)	0	18	4
Ferencváros	2025–26	Nemzeti Bajnokság I	18	2	1	0	8 (Note: Five appearances and one goal in UEFA Champions League, three appearances in UEFA Europa League)	1	27	3
Ferencváros	Total		31	6	5	0	9	1	45	7
Career total			163	27	15	1	11	1	190	29

=== International ===
As of match played 6 June 2025

Appearances and goals by national team, year and competition
National team	Year	Apps	Goals
Hungary	2025	1	0
Total		1	0

== Honours ==
Ferencváros

- Nemzeti Bajnokság I: 2024–25
- Magyar Kupa: 2025–26
