= Zsombor Gruber =

Hungarian association football player

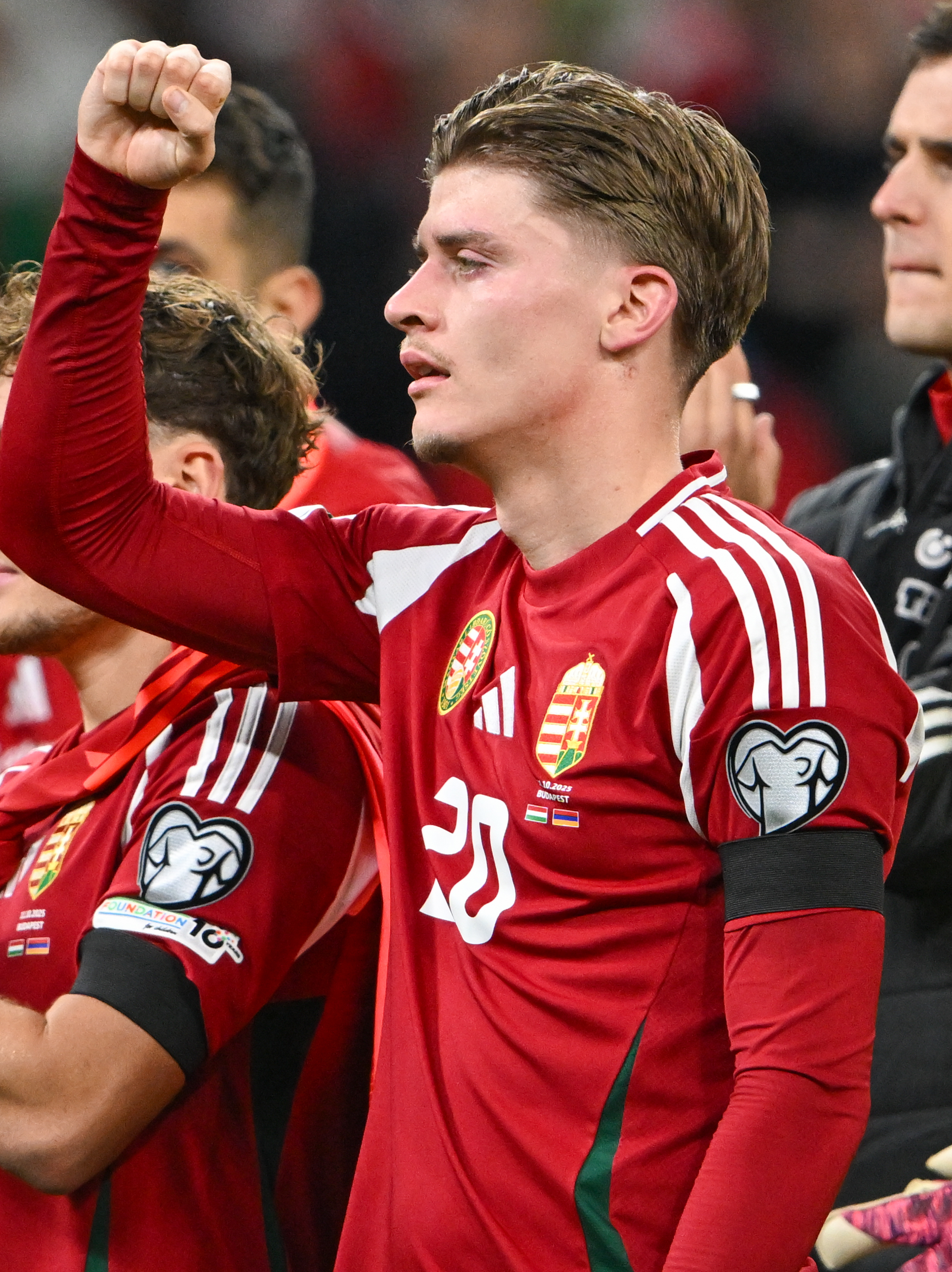
- Gruber with Hungary in 2025

Personal information
- Date of birth: 7 September 2004 (age 22)
- Place of birth: Győr, Hungary
- Height: 1.80 m (5 ft 11 in)
- Position: Forward

Team information
- Current team: RAAL La Louvière
- Number: 30

Youth career
- –2017: Győr
- 2017–2021: Puskás Akadémia
- 2021–2022: Basel

Senior career*
Years	Team	Apps	(Gls)
2022–2024	Puskás Akadémia	43	(6)
2024–2026	Ferencváros	38	(10)
2024	→ Zalaegerszeg (loan)	8	(3)
2025	→ MTK Budapest (loan)	9	(2)
2026–	RAAL La Louvière	3	(0)

International career^{‡}
2019	Hungary U-15	5	(0)
2019–2020	Hungary U-16	4	(1)
2021	Hungary U-18	1	(0)
2022–2023	Hungary U-19	10	(4)
2023–	Hungary U-21	6	(1)
2024–	Hungary	3	(1)
- * Club domestic league appearances and goals as of 30 August 2026 ‡ National team caps and goals as of 11 October 2025 (UTC)

Zsombor Gruber (born 7 September 2004) is a Hungarian international footballer who plays as a forward for Belgian Pro League club RAAL La Louvière and the Hungary national team.

== Club career ==
=== Zalaegerszeg ===
On 9 February 2024, he was loaned to Zalaegerszegi TE.

=== MTK Budapest ===
On 14 February 2025, he was loaned to MTK Budapest FC. He made 18 appearances and scored two goals in the 2024–25 Nemzeti Bajnokság I season. On 1 March 2025, he scored a goal in a 5–1 victory over Újpest FC at the Szusza Ferenc Stadion. On 17 May 2025, he scored a goal in a 2–1 defeat from Diósgyőri VTK at the Diósgyőri Stadion. All in all, he made nine league appearances in MTK and scored two goals. He suffered a thigh injury while playing for MTK and he had to ret for five weeks.

=== Ferencváros ===
On 1 July 2025, he came back from loan to Ferencváros. Thanks to his performance at MTK, Robbie Keane added him to the team playing preparing for the Champions League qualifiers. On 2 August 2025, he scored his first goal for Ferencváros in a 3–0 victory over newly-promoted Kazincbarcikai SC in the 2025–26 Nemzeti Bajnokság I season.

On 9 August 2025, he scored twice in a 4–1 victory over Nyíregyháza Spartacus FC in the 2025–26 Nemzeti Bajnokság I season. He scored the winning goal in a 1-0 victory over Paksi FC in the 2025-26 Nemzeti Bajnokság I season at the Fehérvári úti Stadion on 1 February 2026. On 9 May 2026, he won the 2025–26 Magyar Kupa season with Ferencváros by beating Zalaegerszegi TE 1–0 in the 2026 Magyar Kupa final at Puskás Aréna.

=== La Louvière ===
On 14 August 2026, Belgian Pro League club RAAL La Louvière signed Gruber. He debuted in a 2–1 defeat from KRC Gent in the 2026–27 Belgian Pro League season on 16 August 2026.

== International career ==
He was first called up for Hungary in 2024 against the Netherlands and Germany in the 2024–25 UEFA Nations League A season. In an interview with Nemzeti Sport, he said that: "I still can't believe it". He debuted in the national team on 19 November 2024 in a 1–1 draw against Germany at the Puskás Aréna in the 2024–25 UEFA Nations League A match.

He scored his first goal in a 2–0 victory over Armenia in the 2026 FIFA World Cup qualification match at the Puskás Aréna on 11 October 2025.

== Career statistics ==
=== Club ===
As of match played 5 October 2025

Appearances and goals by club, season and competition
Club	Season	League			Magyar Kupa		Europe		Total	
Club	Season	Division	Apps	Goals	Apps	Goals	Apps	Goals	Apps	Goals
Puskás Akadémia	2021–22	Nemzeti Bajnokság I	0	0	0	0	1 (Note: Appearance in UEFA Europa Conference League)	0	1	0
Puskás Akadémia	2022–23	Nemzeti Bajnokság I	26	3	3	1	—		29	4
Puskás Akadémia	2023–24	Nemzeti Bajnokság I	17	3	0	0	—		17	3
Puskás Akadémia	Total		43	6	3	1	1	0	47	7
Csákvár (loan)	2022–23	Nemzeti Bajnokság I	4	0	—		—		4	0
Ferencváros	2023–24	Nemzeti Bajnokság I	0	0	0	0	0	0	0	0
Ferencváros	2024–25	Nemzeti Bajnokság I	9	1	0	0	5 (Note: Two appearances in UEFA Champions League, three appearances in UEFA Europa League)	0	14	1
Ferencváros	2025–26	Nemzeti Bajnokság I	8	6	0	0	5 (Note: Four appearance in UEFA Champions League, one appearance in UEFA Europa League)	0	13	6
Ferencváros	Total		17	7	0	0	10	0	27	7
Zalaegerszeg (loan)	2023–24	Nemzeti Bajnokság I	8	3	1	0	—		9	3
MTK (loan)	2024–25	Nemzeti Bajnokság I	9	2	—		—		9	2
La Louvière	2026–27	Belgian Pro League	0	0	—		—		0	0
Career total			81	18	4	1	11	0	96	19

=== International ===
As of match played 11 October 2025

Appearances and goals by national team and year
National team	Year	Apps	Goals
Hungary	2024	1	0
Hungary	2025	2	1
Total		3	1

Scores and results list Hungary's goal tally first, score column indicates score after each Gruber goal.

List of international goals scored by Zsombor Gruber
No.	Date	Venue	Cap	Opponent	Score	Result	Competition
1	11 October 2025	Puskás Aréna, Budapest, Hungary	3	Armenia	2–0	2–0	2026 FIFA World Cup qualification

== Honours ==
Ferencváros

- Nemzeti Bajnokság I: 2024–25

Individual

- Nemzeti Bajnokság I Player of the Month: July–August 2025
