= Alex Tóth =

Hungarian footballer (born 2005)

- Tóth with Bournemouth in 2026

Personal information
- Full name: Alex László Tóth
- Date of birth: 23 October 2005 (age 21)
- Place of birth: Budapest, Hungary
- Height: 1.81 m (5 ft 11 in)
- Position: Midfielder

Team information
- Current team: Bournemouth
- Number: 27

Youth career
- 2010–2014: Gloriett SE
- 2014–2016: Ferencváros
- 2016–2018: Honvéd
- 2018–2023: Ferencváros

Senior career*
Years	Team	Apps	(Gls)
2023–2026	Ferencváros	38	(3)
2023–2024	→ Soroksár (loan)	23	(0)
2026–	Bournemouth	11	(0)

International career^{‡}
2022	Hungary U18	6	(0)
2023	Hungary U19	2	(0)
2024	Hungary U20	2	(0)
2024–	Hungary U21	2	(0)
2025–	Hungary	16	(0)
- * Club domestic league appearances and goals as of 20 September 2026 ‡ National team caps and goals as of 7 October 2026

Alex László Tóth (born 23 October 2005) is a Hungarian professional footballer who plays as a midfielder for Premier League club Bournemouth and the Hungary national team. According to CIES Football Observatory, he was ranked the 32nd best football player among the under 20-year-old footballers.

== Club career ==
Tóth was born and raised in Gyál, Pest County. Alex Tóth took his first steps with a football at the age of three and a half. He went to a nearby football field with his father's brother-in-law's little son, and then began his studies at the Gloriett Sports School in Pestszentlőrinc. Tóth attended Leövey Klára Gimnázium in Budapest. He was awarded the male sportsperson of Gyál in 2024.

=== Ferencváros ===
==== 2022–23 season ====
Tóth debuted in Ferencváros in the 2022–23 Nemzeti Bajnokság I season in a 3–1 defeat from Debreceni VSC at the Groupama Aréna on 20 May 2023. He made one more appearance in that season against Mezőkövesdi SE at the Mezőkövesdi Városi Stadion. The match ended with a 1–0 defeat but Ferencváros had already won the championship.

=== Soroksár (loan) ===
In 2023, Tóth was loaned to Soroksár SC. He played his first match in a 2–1 victory over Budapesti VSC on 11 February 2024 in the 2023–24 Nemzeti Bajnokság II season. In that season, he made 8 more appearances. In the 2024–25 Nemzeti Bajnokság II season, he made 11 appearances. During his spell at Soroksár, he was coached by former Ferencváros legend, Péter Lipcsei.

=== Ferencváros (return) ===
==== 2024–25 season ====
After the departure of Pascal Jansen, Ferencváros' sports director Tamás Hajnal was thinking about loaning Tóth to smaller football clubs to provide him more opportunity to play. However, the arrival of Irish manager Robbie Keane changed Tóth's career as Keane found a place for Tóth in the starting lineup.

On 20 April 2025, Tóth scored his first goal in the Nemzeti Bajnokság I in a 7–0 home victory over Nyíregyháza in the 2024–25 Nemzeti Bajnokság I season.

On 18 May 2025, he scored his second goal in the season in a 3–0 victory over Fehérvár at the Groupama Arena.

According to CIES, he made the most assists among the below 21-year-old footballers, as of July 2025.

Tóth was awarded the best footballer of the 2024–25 Nemzeti Bajnokság I season at Ferencváros. On 30 August 2025, his contract with Ferencváros was renewed.

Tóth won the 2024–25 league title with Ferencváros after defeating Győr 2–1 at the ETO Park on the last matchday on 24 May 2025.

==== 2025–26 season ====
On 27 August 2025, Tóth scored a free-kick goal in the playoff of the 2025–26 UEFA Champions League qualifying in a 3–2 victory over Qarabağ at the Tofiq Bahramov Republican Stadium in Baku, Azerbaijan.

On 9 November 2025, he scored his first league goal of the 2025–26 season in a 3–1 victory over Kazincbarcika at the Mezőkövesdi Városi Stadion.

In November 2025, he was regarded as the most valuable player of the Nemzeti Bajnokság I.

Thanks to his performances, he was linked with SS Lazio and Como 1907.

=== Bournemouth ===
On 16 January 2026, it was revealed by BBC Sport that Premier League club Bournemouth had agreed to sign Tóth from Ferencváros for a reported fee of £10.4 million. On 20 January, the transfer was confirmed. He debuted in a 3–2 victory over Liverpool at the Dean Court in the 2025–26 Premier League season on 24 January 2026. He entered the pitch as a substitute for Álex Jiménez in the 85th minute. He was listed among the top five signings of the winter transfer of the 2025–26 Premier League season by The Athletic along with Marc Guéhi, Douglas Luiz, and Antoine Semenyo. On 10 February, he was included in the starting line-up against Everton at the Goodison Park.

On 22 October 2026, he got injured in a 2026–27 UEFA Europa League league phase match against AC Milan.

== International career ==
Tóth was first called up by Italian manager Marco Rossi in March 2025. He debuted for the Hungary national team in a 3–0 defeat against Turkey in the 2024–25 UEFA Nations League promotion/relegation play-offs on 23 March 2025. In the same year, he earned eight more caps for the national team.

== Personal life ==
In an interview with Blikk, his father, László, said of Alex "We brought him home from school at four o'clock, but he would kick the wall in his room until seven in the evening. He would constantly watch videos of his favorite football players and then practice the tricks he saw in them. Sometimes we would tell him at eleven in the evening because he was still playing. That was his whole evening".

Péter Lipcsei, former Ferencváros icon and FC Porto player, said that "He doesn't need to be explained what a Fradi heart is, and it comes with exceptional stamina". Lipcsei also said that "He's not the type to cry, he doesn't get offended even if he's left out of line".

Tóth's idol is Cristiano Ronaldo. They were photographed during the 2026 FIFA World Cup qualification – UEFA second round match against Portugal.

== Career statistics ==
=== Club ===
As of match played 22 October 2026

Appearances and goals by club, season and competition
Club	Season	League			National cup (Note: Includes Magyar Kupa)		League cup (Note: Includes EFL Cup)		Europe		Total	
Club	Season	Division	Apps	Goals	Apps	Goals	Apps	Goals	Apps	Goals	Apps	Goals
Ferencváros	2022–23	Nemzeti Bajnokság I	2	0	0	0	—		0	0	2	0
Ferencváros	2023–24	Nemzeti Bajnokság I	5	0	1	0	—		0	0	6	0
Ferencváros	2024–25	Nemzeti Bajnokság I	17	2	5	0	—		5 (Note: One appearance in UEFA Champions League, four appearances in UEFA Europa League)	0	27	2
Ferencváros	2025–26	Nemzeti Bajnokság I	14	1	0	0	—		11 (Note: Six appearances and one goal in UEFA Champions League, five appearances in UEFA Europa League)	1	25	2
Ferencváros	Total		38	3	6	0	—		16	1	60	4
Soroksár (loan)	2023–24	Nemzeti Bajnokság II	9	0	—		—		—		9	0
Soroksár (loan)	2024–25	Nemzeti Bajnokság II	14	0	—		—		—		14	0
Soroksár (loan)	Total		23	0	—		—		—		23	0
Bournemouth	2025–26	Premier League	9	0	—		—		—		9	0
Bournemouth	2026–27	Premier League	2	0	0	0	1	0	1 (Note: Appearance in UEFA Europa League)	0	4	0
Bournemouth	Total		11	0	0	0	1	0	1	0	13	0
Career total			72	3	6	0	1	0	17	1	96	4

=== International ===
As of match played 5 October 2026

Appearances and goals by national team and year
National team	Year	Apps	Goals
Hungary	2025	9	0
Hungary	2026	7	0
Total		16	0

== Honours ==
Ferencváros

- Nemzeti Bajnokság I: 2024–25
