= Dávid Gróf =

Hungarian footballer

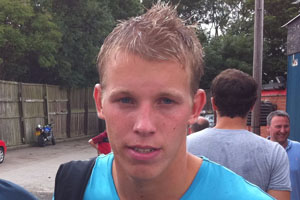
- Gróf in July 2010

Personal information
- Full name: Dávid Attila Gróf
- Date of birth: 17 April 1989 (age 37)
- Place of birth: Budapest, Hungary
- Height: 1.91 m (6 ft 3 in)
- Position: Goalkeeper

Team information
- Current team: Ferencváros
- Number: 99

Youth career
- 2006–2008: Hibernian

Senior career*
Years	Team	Apps	(Gls)
2008–2009	Hibernian	0	(0)
2010–2011	Notts County	0	(0)
2010	→ Tamworth (loan)	0	(0)
2011	→ Mansfield Town (loan)	13	(0)
2011–2013	Walsall	23	(0)
2013–2014	Goslarer	14	(0)
2014–2015	Berliner	10	(0)
2015–2016	Csákvár	30	(0)
2016–2019	Budapest Honvéd	91	(0)
2019–2021	Ferencváros	7	(0)
2020–2021	→ Debrecen (loan)	23	(0)
2021–2023	Debrecen	23	(0)
2023–2025	Levadiakos	45	(0)
2025–2026	Ferencváros	12	(0)
- * Club domestic league appearances and goals as of 30 May 2026

Dávid Attila Gróf (born 17 April 1989) is a Hungarian professional footballer who plays as a goalkeeper for Nemzeti Bajnokság club Ferencváros. Gróf started his senior career with Scottish club Hibernian, making one appearance during the 2008–09 season before being released from his contract. He subsequently played in England for Notts County, Tamworth, Mansfield Town and Walsall.

== Career ==
=== Hibernian ===
Gróf started his professional career with Hibernian, making his professional debut in their 4–3 defeat by Greenock Morton in the Scottish League Cup on 26 August 2008.

Later that season, Gróf was convicted of a drink driving offence and was consequently banned from driving for two years. Hibs also disciplined the player, who made a public apology through the club's website. He was relegated to the status of fourth choice goalkeeper at Hibs after the arrival of Grzegorz Szamotulski during January 2009. Gróf went on trial at West Bromwich Albion, but was released by Hibs towards the end of the 2008–09 season, despite having 18 months left on his contract.

Following his release by Hibs, Gróf trained with English League Two side Gillingham, featuring in a reserve team match against Lewes.

=== Notts County ===
Gróf went on trial with League One club Notts County in July 2010. He agreed a deal to sign for the club, subject to medical. On the same day as the deal with Notts County was announced, Gróf played for Tamworth in a friendly match against Aberdeen. He completed the move on 26 July. On 4 August 2010 it was confirmed that Gróf would be joining The Lambs on a one-month loan deal in time for the new season. Just six days later Gróf was recalled by his parent club.

Gróf signed on loan with Conference National club Mansfield Town on 31 January 2011. Grof played an integral part in Mansfield's FA Trophy run which saw the Stags lose to Darlington in the final at Wembley on 7 May. Despite not being permitted to play in the final itself, Grof became a hero to the Mansfield fans due to his performances in both the FA Trophy and the Conference National, and appeared before the game against Darlington to a standing ovation from the 15000 strong travelling Mansfield fans.

Despite rave reviews of his performances at Mansfield, Grof was waived by Notts County at the end of the season alongside defender Graeme Lee..

=== Walsall ===
Following a trial spell, Gróf signed a one-year contract with Football League One side Walsall in July 2011. Gróf made his full Walsall debut against Bournemouth, keeping a cleen sheet in a 2–0 win, and then made his home debut the following game—a Football League Trophy first round fixture against Shrewsbury Town, which Walsall won 2–1. On 17 March 2013, Gróf announced that he was moving to France to pursue a career away from the Saddlers, having fallen down the pecking order at Walsall behind a string of successive loan goalkeepers manager Dean Smith had signed due to his poor early season form.

=== Clermont ===
On 18 March 2013, Gróf began his trial with Clermont, successfully completing the first part of his medical and training with the first team later that day.

=== Germany ===
In November 2013, Gróf moved to German side Goslarer SC, where he remained until the end of the season before signing for Berliner AK.

=== Ferencváros ===
On 16 June 2020, he became champion with Ferencváros by beating Budapest Honvéd FC at the Hidegkuti Nándor Stadion on the 30th match day of the 2019–20 Nemzeti Bajnokság I season.

=== Debrecen and Levadiakos ===
On 4 September 2020, he was transferred to the Debrecen on loan. He became a player of the On 4September 2020, he was transferred to the Debrecen on loan. He became a player of the Debrecen team from July 1, 2021, the club exercised the option after the end of the one-year loan contract.

On 31 January 2023, Gróf became a new Levadiakos player.

=== Ferencváros (return) ===
On 9 May 2026, he won the 2025–26 Magyar Kupa season with Ferencváros by beating Zalaegerszegi TE 1–0 in the 2026 Magyar Kupa final at Puskás Aréna.

== Personal life ==
Gróf was born in Budapest. His father Attila also played professionally as a goalkeeper, for Vasas Budapest, Újpesti Dózsa, Videoton.

Gróf was convicted of a drink driving offence and banned from driving for two years. He was charged with another drink driving offence in April 2009.

He is married to Klaudia Gróf-Komsa on 3 August 2017. She is a Hungarian handball player.

== Career statistics ==
Appearances and goals by club, season and competition
Club	Season	League			Cup		League Cup		Europe		Total	
Club	Season	Division	Apps	Goals	Apps	Goals	Apps	Goals	Apps	Goals	Apps	Goals
Hibernian	2008–09	Scottish Premier League	0	0	0	0	1	0	0	0	1	0
Mansfield Town	2010–11	Football Conference	13	0	0	0	0	0	-	-	13	0
Walsall	2011–12	Football League One	23	0	1	0	1	0	-	-	25	0
Walsall	2012–13	Football League One	10	0	2	0	2	0	-	-	14	0
Walsall	Total		33	0	3	0	3	0	-	-	39	0
Goslarer SC	2013–14	Regionalliga Nord	14	0	0	0	-	-	-	-	14	0
Berliner AK	2014–15	Regionalliga Nordost	10	0	0	0	-	-	-	-	10	0
Csákvár	2015–16	Nemzeti Bajnokság II	30	0	1	0	-	-	-	-	31	0
Budapest Honvéd	2016–17	Nemzeti Bajnokság I	25	0	3	0	-	-	-	-	28	0
Budapest Honvéd	2017–18	Nemzeti Bajnokság I	33	0	0	0	-	-	2	0	35	0
Budapest Honvéd	2018–19	Nemzeti Bajnokság I	33	0	1	0	-	-	4	0	38	0
Budapest Honvéd	Total		91	0	4	0	-	-	6	0	101	0
Ferencváros	2019–20	Nemzeti Bajnokság I	7	0	3	0	—		0	0	10	0
Debrecen	2020–21	Nemzeti Bajnokság II	23	0	3	0	—		—		26	0
Debrecen	2021–22	Nemzeti Bajnokság I	17	0	2	0	—		—		19	0
Debrecen	Total		40	0	5	0	—		0	0	45	0
Career total			238	0	16	0	4	0	6	0	264	0

Updated to games played as of 15 May 2022.
