= Gabi Kanichowsky =

Israeli footballer (born 1997)

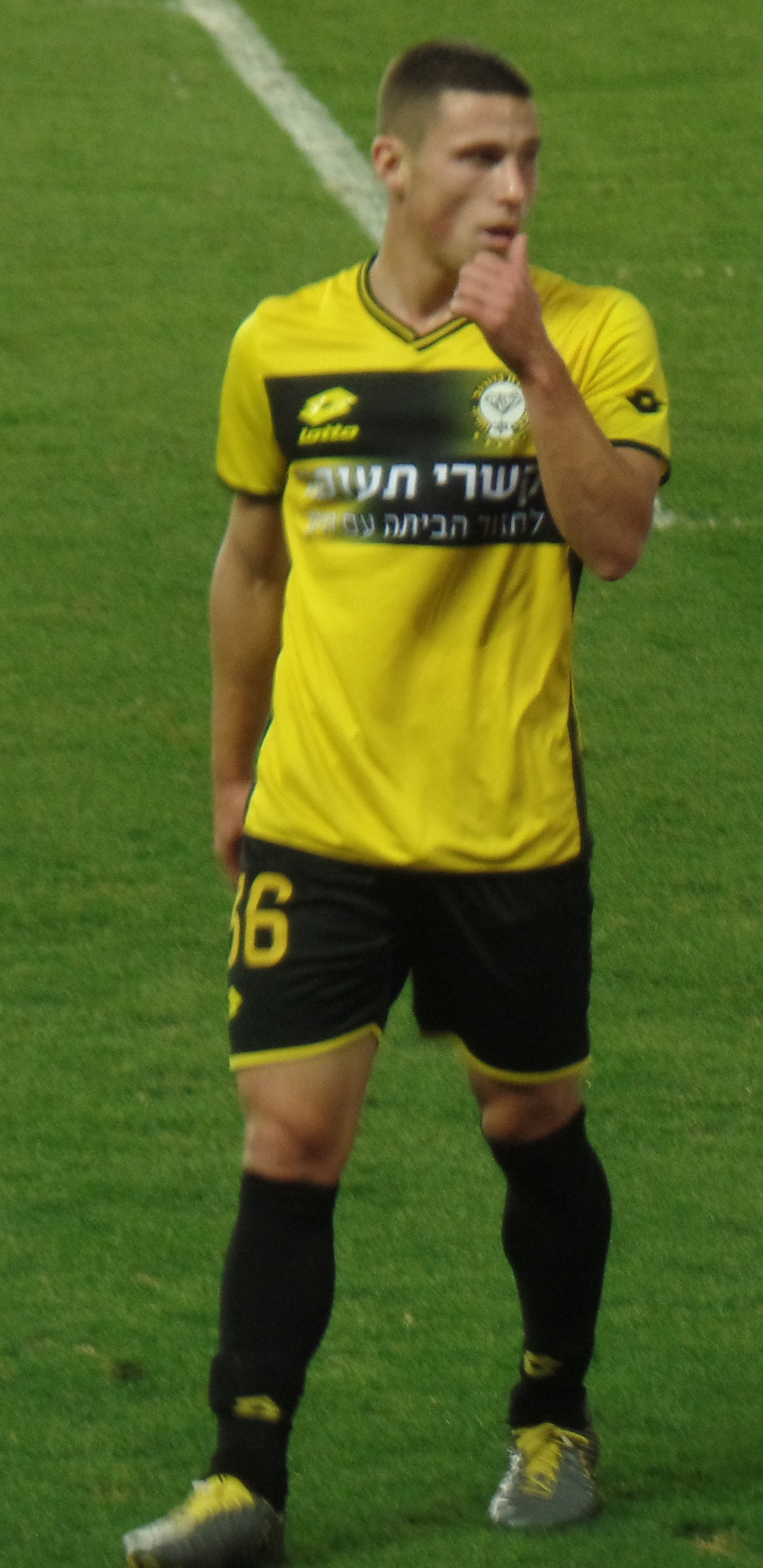
- Kanichowsky playing for Maccabi Netanya in 2019

Personal information
- Full name: Gavriel Gilad Kanichowsky
- Date of birth: 24 August 1997 (age 29)
- Place of birth: Ra'anana, Israel
- Height: 1.65 m (5 ft 5 in)
- Position: Midfielder

Team information
- Current team: Maccabi Tel Aviv
- Number: 16

Youth career
- 2006–2014: Hapoel Ra'anana
- 2014–2016: Maccabi Tel Aviv

Senior career*
Years	Team	Apps	(Gls)
2015–2018	Maccabi Tel Aviv	0	(0)
2016–2017	→ Hapoel Petah Tikva (loan)	36	(4)
2017–2018	→ Hapoel Acre (loan)	33	(6)
2018	Hapoel Acre	0	(0)
2018–2021	Maccabi Netanya	92	(15)
2021–2025	Maccabi Tel Aviv	136	(19)
2025–2026	Ferencváros	31	(2)
2026–	Maccabi Tel Aviv	2	(0)

International career^{‡}
2015	Israel U19	4	(0)
2017–2018	Israel U21	11	(1)
2022–	Israel	23	(1)
- * Club domestic league appearances and goals as of 24 May 2026 ‡ National team caps and goals as of 20:40, 1 October 2026 (UTC)

Gavriel Gilad "Gabi" Kanichowsky (or Gabriel "Gabby" Kanikovski, Hebrew: גבריאל גלעד "גבי" קניקובסקי; born 24 August 1997) is an Israeli professional footballer who plays as a midfielder for Maccabi Tel Aviv and the Israel national team.

== Early and personal life ==
Kanichowsky was born and raised in Ra'anana, Israel, to a religious Jewish family of Ashkenazi Jewish descent. He attended a yeshiva, and observes Shabbat.

He married his Israeli fiancée Dana (née Hunter) in 2019.

== Club career ==
Kanichowsky made his professional debut for Hapoel Petah Tikva in the Israeli Premier League on 22 August 2016, starting in the match against Maccabi Netanya, which finished as a 0–0 home draw. In 2018, Hapoel Acre, who Kanichowsky was on loan with, exercised their option to sign him permanently from Maccabi Tel Aviv. He then joined Maccabi Netanya for the 2018–19 season.

=== Ferencváros ===
On 9 May 2026, he won the 2025–26 Magyar Kupa season with Ferencváros by beating Zalaegerszegi TE 1–0 in the 2026 Magyar Kupa final at Puskás Aréna.

== International career ==
Kanichowsky has been a youth international since 2015. Between 2017 and 2018, he was part of Israel under-21s.

He was first called up for the senior Israel national team in November 2021, during their 2022 FIFA World Cup qualifiers – UEFA. He debuted for the Israel national team in a friendly 2–0 loss to Germany on 26 March 2022. He scored his first international goal on 12 September 2023, in their 1–0 win over Belarus during the Euro 2024 qualifying.

== International goals ==
No.	Date	Venue	Opponent	Score	Result	Competition
1.	12 September 2023	Bloomfield Stadium, Tel Aviv, Israel	Belarus	1–0	1–0	UEFA Euro 2024 qualifying

== Honours ==
Maccabi Tel Aviv

- Israeli premier league: 2023–24, 2024–25

Ferencváros

- Hungarian Cup: 2025–26
