= Toon Raemaekers =

Belgian footballer

Personal information
- Date of birth: 9 September 2000 (age 26)
- Place of birth: Diest, Belgium
- Height: 1.94 m (6 ft 4 in)
- Position: Centre back

Team information
- Current team: Ferencváros
- Number: 28

Youth career
- Diest
- Lierse
- –2018: Westerlo
- 2018–2020: OH Leuven

Senior career*
Years	Team	Apps	(Gls)
2020–2022	OH Leuven	12	(0)
2022–2025	Mechelen	44	(0)
2022–2023	→ Lierse Kempenzonen (loan)	27	(2)
2025–	Ferencváros	29	(0)
- * Club domestic league appearances and goals as of 30 May 2026

Toon Raemaekers (born 9 September 2000) is a Belgian professional footballer who plays as a centre-back for Ferencváros.

Raemaekers made his professional debut for OH Leuven on 11 February 2020 in the home match against Union SG, ending 0–0.

== Club career ==
=== Ferencváros ===
On 24 June 2025, Raemaekers signed to Hungarian club Ferencváros. On 9 May 2026, he won the 2025–26 Magyar Kupa season with Ferencváros by beating Zalaegerszegi TE 1–0 in the 2026 Magyar Kupa final at Puskás Aréna.

== Honours ==
Ferencváros

- Hungarian Cup: 2025–26
