= Barnabás Nagy =

Hungarian footballer (born 2000)

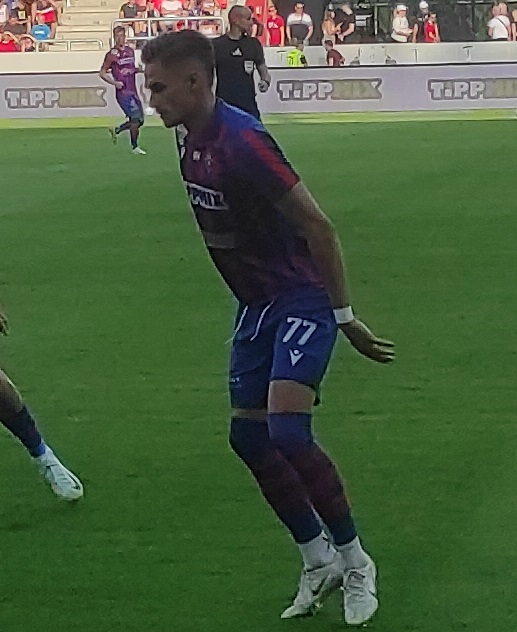
- Nagy with Nyíregyháza in 2024

Personal information
- Full name: Barnabás Szabolcs Nagy
- Date of birth: September 5, 2000 (age 26)
- Place of birth: Szigetvár, Hungary
- Height: 1.85 m (6 ft 1 in)
- Position: Left back

Team information
- Current team: Ferencváros
- Number: 77

Youth career
- 2007–2009: Szigetvári TK
- 2009–2015: Pécsi MFC
- 2015–2016: Ferencváros
- 2016–2017: Szentlőrinc
- 2017–2020: MTK Budapest

Senior career*
Years	Team	Apps	(Gls)
2017–2023	MTK Budapest	13	(0)
2019–2020	→ FC Ajka (loan)	17	(0)
2020–2021	→ Szentlőrinc (loan)	34	(1)
2022	→ Szentlőrinc (loan)	12	(1)
2023–2025	Nyíregyháza	82	(1)
2025–	Ferencváros	29	(2)
- * Club domestic league appearances and goals as of 30 May 2026

Barnabás Szabolcs Nagy (born September 5, 2000) is a Hungarian footballer who plays for Ferencvárosi TC.

== Club career ==
He began his career at his hometown club, the youth academy of Szigetvári TK. In his early years, he also spent time at the academies of Pécsi MFC, Ferencvárosi TC, Szentlőrinc, and MTK Budapest. He made his senior debut with Szentlőrinc, coming on as a substitute in a 3–0 victory against Komlói Bányász SK in the Hungarian third division.

=== MTK Budapest ===
In 2017, he joined the MTK Budapest academy, where he played for the U17, U19, and the second team. He debuted for the first team on 25 March 2018, starting and playing 83 minutes in a second division match against Budaörs. In August 2018, he signed a professional contract with the club. Balázs Polyák, MTK's sporting director, commented on his play: "Considering the state of Hungarian football, it is evident how valuable it can be when someone plays in a position of need. He is such a player, as he has all the attributes to succeed as a left-back. Agile, fast, good with both feet and heading the ball. It’s up to him how far he will go, and we will give him all the support for that." Despite the professional contract, he continued playing with the U19 team and on 31 October 2018, he started in the senior team in a 5–0 Hungarian Cup victory over Vecsési FC. In the 2019–20 season, he was on loan at FC Ajka, and in the 2020–21 season, on loan at Szentlőrinc.

On 6 August 2021, Zoltán Gera, coach of the Hungarian U21 national team, invited him to the national squad’s training camp, although he did not receive playing time. He made his debut in the Hungarian top division on 7 August 2021 in a 1–0 win against Budapest Honvéd.

In the 2021–22 season, he was mainly a squad player for the blue-whites, frequently coming on as a substitute for the first team, and played three matches for the second team in the third division. Due to this, he was loaned out again to Szentlőrinc for the second half of the season. After returning, in the first half of the 2022–23 season, he played five matches for the now second-division first team and appeared seven times for the second team in the third division.

==== FC Ajka (loan) ====
On 24 June 2019, he was loaned to FC Ajka, a club in the Hungarian second division, for one season. He made his debut for the team on 4 August 2019 in a 1–0 defeat against Győri ETO in the first round of NB II. He played 17 league matches in total without scoring.

==== Szentlőrinc (on loan) ====
He spent the 2020–2021 season on loan at Szentlőrinc. He was a regular starter for the second division team, appearing in 34 matches throughout the season. On April 7, 2021, he scored his first goal for the club in a 1–1 draw against Kazincbarcikai SC. At the end of the season, he returned to MTK.

In January 2022, it was announced that MTK would loan him again to the Baranya-based club for the spring season. On March 20, 2022, he scored the winning goal from a free kick in a 1–0 victory against Szombathelyi Haladás. After the loan contract expired, he returned to MTK at the end of the season.

=== Nyíregyháza Spartacus ===
In January 2023, it was announced that he signed a two-year contract with Nyíregyháza Spartacus. His debut match took place on January 29, 2023, against Szombathelyi Haladás, where he started and played the full game. During his first season, he played a total of 18 league matches, starting in all of them.

In the 2023–24 season, he was a key player for the team that won the NB II championship, appearing 37 times in total, 32 of which as a starter. He was also a regular in the Hungarian Cup, where his team advanced all the way to the semi-finals before being eliminated by Ferencváros. He did not score any goals in his first season but provided five assists.

In July 2024, it was announced that he extended his contract with the club for two more years. After signing the extension, he said: "It feels great that they were satisfied with my performance. For me, there was no question about extending, and I am happy to play in the top division again. I want to be a key player in NB I for the team, and I hope for a successful season ahead."

He remained an important member of the squad in the top division as well, playing in 32 matches during the 2024–25 season, starting 31 of them. He scored his first NB I goal for the club on September 21, 2024, in a 3–2 league derby win against Debreceni VSC. During the season, he scored one goal and provided six assists.

=== Ferencváros ===
On June 11, 2025, it was announced that Ferencvárosi TC had signed Barnabás Nagy. Tamás Hajnal, the sports director of FTC, described his playing style as follows: "Barna’s game has the kind of intensity that is indispensable in modern football. As an attacking left-back, he is able to regularly create chances — his assists make him a serious weapon on the left side. He is comfortable in various tactical systems, whether it is a three- or four-defender formation."

== Honours ==
=== Club ===
Nyíregyháza Spartacus

- Nemzeti Bajnokság II: 2023–24
