= Čebrails Makreckis =

Latvian footballer

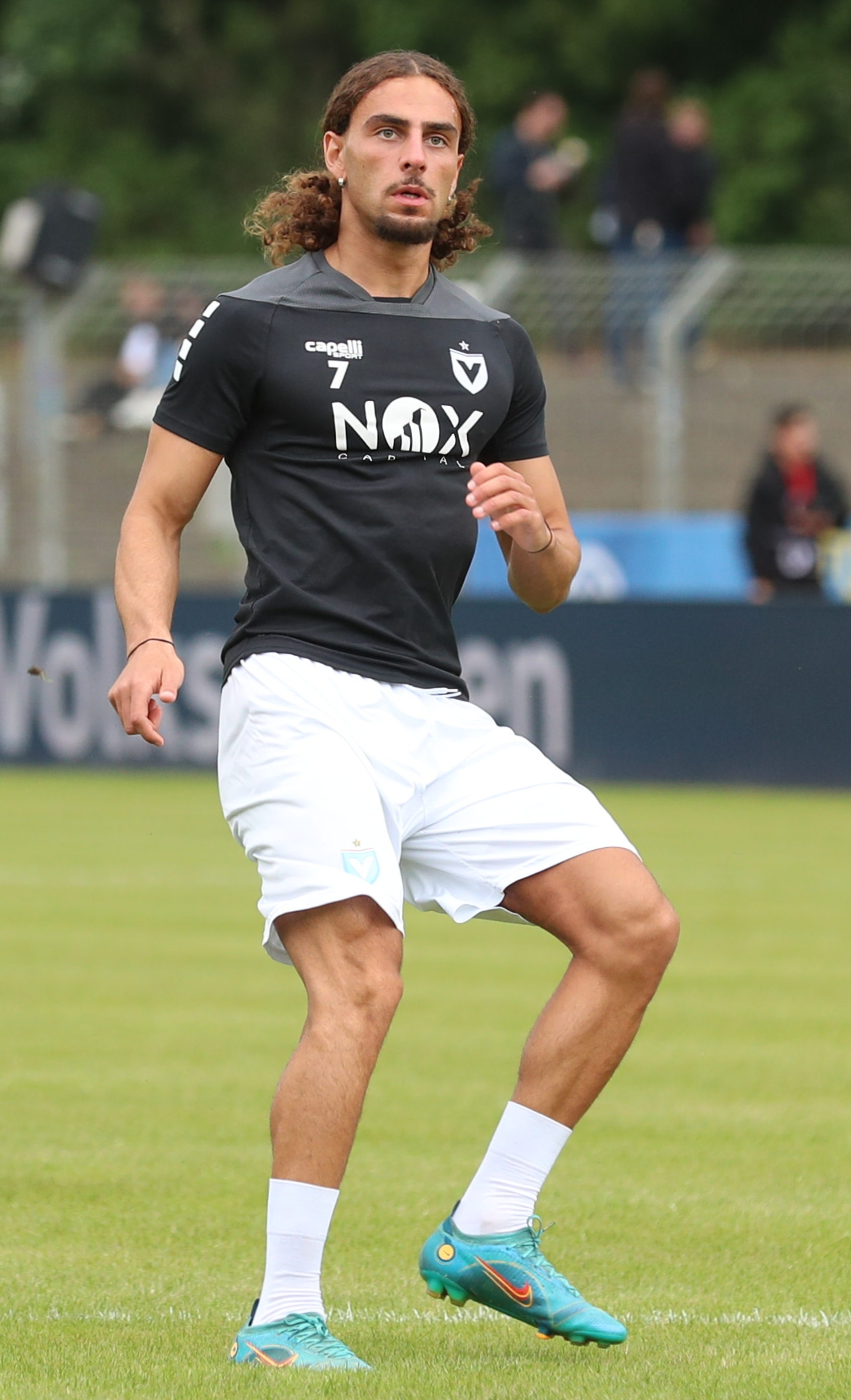
- Makreckis with Viktoria Berlin in 2022

Personal information
- Date of birth: 10 May 2000 (age 26)
- Place of birth: Aachen, Germany
- Height: 1.80 m (5 ft 11 in)
- Position: Midfielder

Team information
- Current team: Qarabağ
- Number: 25

Youth career
- 2010–2019: Bayer Leverkusen
- 2017–2018: → Bergisch Gladbach (loan)

Senior career*
Years	Team	Apps	(Gls)
2019–2020	Bonner SC	20	(1)
2020–2022	Borussia Dortmund II	27	(1)
2022	Viktoria Berlin	17	(0)
2022–2023	Pirin Blagoevgrad	23	(1)
2023–2026	Ferencváros	74	(2)
2026–	Qarabağ	9	(0)

International career
2018	Latvia U19	7	(1)
- * Club domestic league appearances and goals as of 15:06, 18 November 2026 (UTC)

Čebrails Makreckis (born 10 May 2000) is a professional footballer who plays as a midfielder for Azerbaijan Premier League club Qarabağ. Born in Germany, he represented Latvia at youth international level.

== Club career ==
On 19 January 2022, Makreckis joined 3. Liga club Viktoria 1889 Berlin.

=== Ferencváros ===
On 8 June 2023, Makreckis was signed by Nemzeti Bajnokság I club Ferencváros.

In an interview with Nemzeti Sport, he said that he liked playing as a right defender for Ferencváros. Since Endre Botka got injured and Henry Wingo was not ready to play as right defenders, Csaba Máté asked him to play in that position.

On 20 April 2024, the Ferencváros–Kisvárda tie ended with a goalless draw at the Groupama Aréna on the 29th match day of the 2023–24 Nemzeti Bajnokság I season which meant that Ferencváros won their 35th championship.

On 15 May 2024, Ferencváros were defeated by Paks 2–0 in the 2024 Magyar Kupa Final at the Puskás Aréna. On 9 May 2026, Makreckis won the 2025–26 Magyar Kupa season with Ferencváros by beating Zalaegerszegi TE 1–0 in the 2026 Magyar Kupa final at the Puskás Aréna.

=== Qarabağ ===
On 5 July 2026, Makreckis signed a three-year contract with Qarabağ.

== International career ==
Makreckis is a former youth international for the Latvia under-19 team, making his debut against Estonia as a substitute. Makreckis featured seven times for Latvia under-19, scoring once.

He was pursued by the Egyptian national team ahead of the 2026 World Cup, but due to FIFA regulations, he was ineligible to join.

He is also eligible to represent the Moroccan, Turkish and German senior national teams.

== Career statistics ==
As of 24 July 2021

Appearances and goals by club, season and competition
Club	Season	League			National cup		Continental		Other		Total	
Club	Season	Division	Apps	Goals	Apps	Goals	Apps	Goals	Apps	Goals	Apps	Goals
Bonner SC	2019–20	Regionalliga	20	1	0	0	—		0	0	20	1
Borussia Dortmund II	2020–21	Regionalliga	12	0	—		—		0	0	12	0
Borussia Dortmund II	2021–22	3. Liga	1	0	—		—		0	0	1	0
Borussia Dortmund II	Total		13	0	—		—		0	0	13	0
Career total			33	1	0	0	0	0	0	0	33	1

== Honours ==
Ferencváros

- Nemzeti Bajnokság I: 2023–24, 2024–25
- Hungarian Cup: 2025–26
