= 2026–27 Ferencvárosi TC season =

Ferencváros
2026–27 season
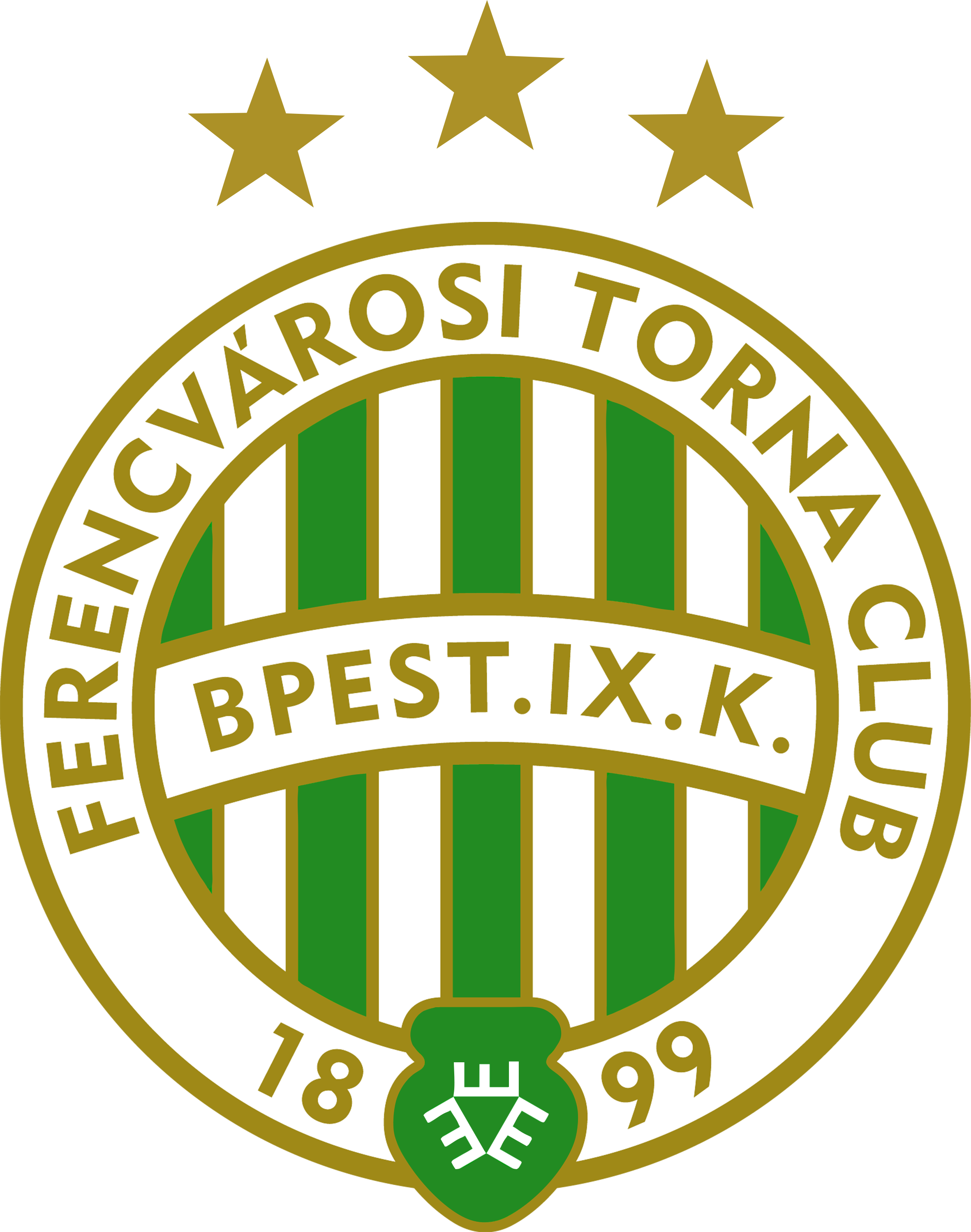
- Chairman: Gábor Kubatov
- Manager: Balázs Borbély (from 1 June 2026)
- Stadium: Groupama Aréna
- Nemzeti Bajnokság I: 4th
- Magyar Kupa: Round of 16
- UEFA Europa League: League phase, 3rd of 36
- Top goalscorer: League: Yusuf (5); All: Zachariassen (11)
- Highest home attendance: 21,011; 2–2 v Trabzonspor, (28 August 2026, EL Play-off, 2nd leg)
- Lowest home attendance: 7,690; 5–0 v MTK, (25 October 2026, NB I, Round 11)
- Average home league attendance: 13,766
- Biggest win: 5 goals 5–0 v MTK, (Home, 25 October 2026, NB I, Round 11)
- Biggest defeat: 2 goals 2–4 v Paks, (Away, 26 July 2026, NB I, Round 1), 1–3 v ETO Győr, (Home, 21 November 2026, NB I, Round 14)
- All statistics correct as of 21 November 2026.

The 2026–27 season is Ferencvárosi Torna Club's 123rd competitive season and 18th consecutive season in the Nemzeti Bajnokság I, 128th year in existence as a football club. In addition to the domestic league, Ferencváros participated in this season's editions of the Magyar Kupa and UEFA Europa League after winning the previous Magyar Kupa (domestic cup).

UEFA Europa League

Ferencváros started UEFA Europa League in the first qualifying round, they eliminated Vojvodina 5–1 on aggregate, who had finished second place Serbian league in last season. In the second qualifying round, they eliminated Twente 4–3 on aggregate, who had finished fourth place Dutch Eredivisie in last season. In the third qualifying round compete Górnik Zabrze, who had finished second place Polish Ekstraklasa in last season.

== Kits ==
Supplier: Macron • Sponsor: Magyar Telekom / Tippmix / Midea / iFOREX • Shirt back sponsor: HSA Group • Sleeve sponsor: Groupama / MVM • Short sponsor: Volkswagen / MVM / Tippmix / Magyar Telekom

Home	Away	Third

Goalkeeper^{1}	Goalkeeper^{2}	Goalkeeper^{3}	Goalkeeper^{4}

== First team squad ==
As of 1 September 2026
Injured player

Note: Flags indicate national team as defined under FIFA eligibility rules; some limited exceptions apply. Players may hold more than one non-FIFA nationality.

No.	Pos.	Nation	Player
1	GK	HUN	Ádám Varga
4	DF	ARG	Mariano Gómez (vice-captain)
5	DF	FRA	Nathan Zohoré
6	MF	HUN	Ádám Nagy
7	FW	SRB	Veljko Birmančević
8	MF	GUI	Naby Keïta
10	FW	SWE	Jonathan Levi
11	FW	NGR	Bamidele Yusuf
14	DF	HUN	Attila Osváth
15	FW	AUS	Daniel Arzani
16	FW	NOR	Kristoffer Zachariassen (vice-captain)
17	MF	ROU	Marius Corbu
18	MF	HUN	Ádám Bagi
19	FW	CRO	Franko Kovačević
20	MF	BRA	Cadu
21	DF	HUN	Endre Botka
22	MF	SVK	Matúš Bero
23	MF	HUN	Bence Ötvös

No.	Pos.	Nation	Player
28	DF	BEL	Toon Raemaekers
29	GK	HUN	Gergő Szécsi
33	GK	HUN	Levente Őri
47	MF	IRL	Callum O'Dowda
54	DF	HUN	Olivér Nagy
62	FW	HUN	Benjámin Gólik
63	GK	HUN	Dániel Radnóti
68	FW	HUN	Zétény Varga
71	DF	HUN	Csongor Lakatos
72	MF	HUN	Ádám Madarász
74	FW	HUN	Szilárd Szabó
75	FW	HAI	Lenny Joseph
76	FW	HUN	Krisztián Lisztes (on loan from Eintracht Frankfurt)
77	DF	HUN	Barnabás Nagy
80	MF	CIV	Habib Maïga
88	MF	BEL	Philippe Rommens
90	GK	HUN	Dénes Dibusz (captain)

== Transfers ==
=== Summer ===
In
Date	No.	Pos.	Nat.	Player	Moving from	Division	Ref.
20 June 2026	5	DF	France	Nathan Zohoré	Boulogne	French Ligue 2	
31 July 2026	6	MF	Hungary	Ádám Nagy	Spezia	Italian Serie B	
28 August 2026	7	FW	Serbia	Veljko Birmančević	Sparta Prague	Czech I	
1 September 2026	22	MF	Slovakia	Matúš Bero	VfL Bochum	2. Bundesliga	

On loan from
Date	No.	Pos.	Nat.	Player	Moving from	Until	Ref.
29 June 2026	76	FW	Hungary	Krisztián Lisztes	Eintracht Frankfurt	30 June 2027	

Return after loan expired
Date	No.	Pos.	Nat.	Player	Moving from	Division	Ref.
30 June 2026	15	DF	Australia	Daniel Arzani	Melbourne City	Australian I	
30 June 2026	32	FW	Serbia	Aleksandar Ćirković	Lechia Gdańsk	Ekstraklasa (Poland I)	
30 June 2026	24	FW	Bosnia and Herzegovina	Kenan Kodro	Real Zaragoza	Segunda División (Spain II)	
30 June 2026	70	MF	Ghana	Isaac Pappoe	Dundee United	Scottish Premiership	
30 June 2026	17	MF	Armenia	Edgar Sevikyan	Akron Tolyatti	Russian Premier League	
30 June 2026	74	FW	Hungary	Szilárd Szabó	Kisvárda	Nemzeti Bajnokság I	
30 June 2026	68	FW	Hungary	Zétény Varga	Diósgyőr	Nemzeti Bajnokság I	
1 July 2026	54	DF	Hungary	Olivér Nagy	Soroksár	Nemzeti Bajnokság II	

Out
Date	No.	Pos.	Nat.	Player	Moving to	Division	Ref.
22 May 2026	8	FW	Serbia	Aleksandar Pešić	Fatih Karagümrük	TFF 1. Lig (Turkey I)	
3 June 2026	3	DF	Switzerland	Stefan Gartenmann	Sampdoria	Serie B	
3 June 2026	89	GK	Hungary	Dávid Gróf	Diósgyőr	Nemzeti Bajnokság II	
13 June 2026	15	MF	Israel	Mohammed Abu Fani	Red Star Belgrade	Serbian I	
1 July 2026	27	DF	France	Ibrahim Cissé	Al-Ittihad Kalba	UAE Pro League (United Arab Emirates I	
2 July 2026	40	FW	Nigeria	Fortune Bassey	TBD		
2 July 2026	44	DF	France	Ismail Aaneba	TBD		
2 July 2026	75	DF	Ghana	Shay Shadirac	TBD		
5 July 2026	25	MF	Latvia	Cebrail Makreckis	Qarabağ	Azerbaijan Premier League	
8 July 2026	66	MF	Brazil	Júlio Romão	Akhmat Grozny	Russian Premier League	
13 August 2026	30	FW	Hungary	Zsombor Gruber	La Louvière	Belgian Pro League	
27 August 2026	7	FW	Netherlands	Elton Acolatse	Al-Hazem	Saudi Pro League	
31 August 2026	36	MF	Israel	Gabi Kanichowsky	Maccabi Tel Aviv	Israeli Premier League	

Out on loan
Date	No.	Pos.	Nat.	Player	Loaned to	Division	Ref.
24 July 2026	22	DF	Hungary	Gábor Szalai	Marítimo	Primeira Liga (Portugal I)	
29 August 2026	24	FW	Bosnia and Herzegovina	Kenan Kodro	OFI Crete	Super League (Greece I)	
1 September 2026	32	FW	Serbia	Aleksandar Ćirković	Jagiellonia Białystok	Ekstraklasa (Poland I)	
1 September 2026	70	MF	Armenia	Edgar Sevikyan	Ceuta	Segunda División (Spanish II)	

=== New contract ===
Date	No.	Pos.	Nat.	Player	Moved from	Ref.
10 June 2026	TBD	FW	Hungary	Zsombor Czinege	Academy of Ferencváros	
30 June 2026	TBD	FW	Hungary	Botond Szegedi	Academy of Ferencváros	

=== Contract renewals ===
Date	No.	Pos.	Nat.	Player	Extension to	Ref.
18 June 2026	21	DF	Hungary	Endre Botka	30 June 2027	
18 June 2026	29	GK	Hungary	Gergő Szécsi	N/A	
18 June 2026	33	GK	Hungary	Levente Őri	N/A	
22 June 2026	80	MF	Ivory Coast	Habib Maïga	N/A	
29 June 2026	76	FW	Hungary	Krisztián Lisztes	loan until 30 June 2027	
1 July 2026	54	DF	Hungary	Olivér Nagy	N/A	

=== Managerial changes ===
Outgoing manager	Manner of departure	Date of vacancy	Position in table	Incoming manager	Date of appointment	Ref.
Robbie Keane	Mutual agreement	23 May 2026	Pre-season	(Slovakia) Balázs Borbély	1 June 2026	

== Friendlies ==
Win Draw Loss Fixtures

=== Pre-season ===
Ferencvárosi TC began preparations for the 2026/27 season on June 8, 2026.

20 June 2026 Friendly	Ferencváros	6–1	(Hungary) Tiszakécske (NB II)	Budapest
14:00 CEST	Yusuf; Z. Varga; Ćirković; Corbu; Kanichowsky	Report	Wirth (pen.)	Stadium: MVM-Népligeti Training Center; Attendance: 0 (behind closed doors)
Note: • Ferencváros 1st half: Á. Varga — V. Szabó, Gómez, Botka, O'Dowda — Z. Varga, Arzani, N. Keïta, Corbu, Ćirković — Yusuf • Ferencváros 2nd half: Dibusz — O. Nagy, Lakatos, Raemaekers, B. Nagy — Levi, Bagi, Rommens, Kanichowsky, Acolatse — Kovačević • Manager: Borbély

Summer training camp in Fieberbrunn, Austria, from 23 June until 2 July 2026.

28 June 2026 Friendly	Sabah (Azerbaijan)	1–1	Ferencváros	Wörgl, Austria
16:30 CEST	Dungus 110'	Report	Gruber 20'	Stadium: Sportzentrum
Note: 2x60 minutes playing time • Ferencváros 1st half: Dibusz — Osváth, Szalai, Gómez, O'Dowda — N. Keïta, Corbu — Gruber, Zachariassen, Acolatse — Yusuf • Ferencváros 2nd half: Á. Varga — Cadu, Zohoré (Maïga (substituted on) 90'), Botka, O. Nagy — Rommens, Levi (Arzani (substituted on) 90'), Sevikyan (Z. Varga (substituted on) 104'), Lisztes (Sz. Szabó (substituted on) 104'), Kanichowsky — Kovačević (Bagi (substituted on) 104') • Manager: Borbély

1 July 2026 Friendly	Qarabağ (Azerbaijan)	0–1	Ferencváros	Kufstein, Austria
17:30 CEST		Report	Yusuf 29'	Stadium: Kufstein Arena
Note: • Ferencváros: Dibusz (Á. Varga (substituted on) 46') — Cadu (O. Nagy (substituted on) 76'), Gómez (Botka (substituted on) 76'), Raemaekers (Zohoré (substituted on) 60'), Osváth (O'Dowda (substituted on) 76') — N. Keïta (Rommens (substituted on) 60'), Kanichowsky (Arzani (substituted on) 76'), Corbu (Zachariassen (substituted on) 76') — Lisztes (Acolatse (substituted on) 60'), Yusuf (Kovačević (substituted on) 60'), Sevikyan (Gruber (substituted on) 76') • Manager: Borbély

=== Mid-season ===
8 August 2026 Friendly	Ferencváros	1–2	(Spain) Real Madrid (La Liga)	Budapest
19:00 CEST	Kodro 57'; Sz. Szabó (yellow card) 90'	Report	Rivas 41'; Espí 49'; Alexander-Arnold (yellow card) 90+1'	Stadium: Groupama Aréna; Attendance: 20,097; Referee: Balázs Berke
Note: • Ferencváros (1st half): Dibusz (c) — Osváth, Gómez, Zohoré, Cadu — Kanichowsky, Rommens — Ćirković, Arzani, Z. Varga — Joseph • Ferencváros (2nd half): Á. Varga — O. Nagy, Raemaekers, Zohoré (Lakatos (substituted on) 78'), O'Dowda — Á. Nagy, Corbu (Keïta (substituted on) 70'), Levi (Sevikyan (substituted on) 78') — Zachariassen (Bagi (substituted on) 78'), Kodro (Lisztes (substituted on) 70'), Yusuf (Sz. Szabó (substituted on) 78') • Manager: Borbély • Player of the match: Arda Güler, Real Madrid 8.3 • Best player of Ferencváros: Kenan Kodro 7.7

3 October 2026 Friendly	Ferencváros	4–0	(Hungary) Soroksár (NB II)	Budapest
14:00 CEST	Zachariassen 15'; Madarász 19'; O'Dowda 56'; Lisztes 57'	Report		Stadium: MVM-Népligeti Training Center; Attendance: 0 (behind closed doors)
Note: • Ferencváros 1st half: Radnóti — Cadu, Raemaekers, Zohoré, O. Nagy — N. Keïta, Madarász — Birmančević, Zachariassen, Yusuf — Kovačević • Ferencváros 2nd half: Á. Varga — O'Dowda, Gómez, Lakatos, Maïga — Rommens, Á. Nagy — Sz. Szabó, Corbu, Levi — Lisztes • Manager: Borbély

Source of fixtures: Soccerway.

== Competitions ==
=== Overall record ===
In italics, we indicate the Last match and the Final position achieved in competition(s) that have not yet been completed.

Competition	First match	Last match	Starting round	Final position	Record							
Competition	First match	Last match	Starting round	Final position	Pld	W	D	L	GF	GA	GD	Win %
Nemzeti Bajnokság I	26 July 2026	21 November 2026	Matchday 1	4th	13	6	5	2	23	13	+10	46.15
Magyar Kupa	12 September 2026	28 October 2026	Round of 32	Round of 16	2	2	0	0	11	1	+10	100.00
UEFA Europa League	9 July 2026	5 November 2026	First qualifying round	League phase, 3rd of 36	12	10	2	0	27	8	+19	83.33
Total					27	18	7	2	61	22	+39	66.67

Last updated: 21 November 2026
Source: Soccerway

=== Nemzeti Bajnokság I ===
==== League table ====
Pos	Team	Pld	W	D	L	GF	GA	GD	Pts	Qualification or relegation
2	Debrecen	14	7	4	3	30	20	+10	25	Qualification for the Conference League second qualifying round
3	Puskás Akadémia	14	8	0	6	19	17	+2	24	Qualification for the Conference League second qualifying round
4	Ferencváros	13	6	5	2	23	13	+10	23	
5	Paks	14	6	2	6	25	24	+1	20	
6	Újpest	14	5	4	5	21	20	+1	19	

Updated to match(es) played on 22 November 2026, Round 14 (6 and 6 matches). Source: Hungarian Football Federation (in Hungarian)
Rules for classification: 1) Points; 2) Matches won; 3) Goal difference; 4) Goals scored (GF); 5) Head-to-head points; 6) Head-to-head goal difference; 7) Fair play ranking; 8) Drawing of lots.

==== Results summary ====
Overall								Home						Away					
Pld	W	D	L	GF	GA	GD	Pts	W	D	L	GF	GA	GD	W	D	L	GF	GA	GD
13	6	5	2	23	13	+10	23	2	3	1	11	6	+5	4	2	1	12	7	+5

Last updated: 21 November 2026.
Source: Soccerway

==== Results by round ====
A = Away; H = Home; W = Win; D = Draw; L = Loss; P = Postponed

Round	1	2	4	6	3^{1}	7	8	9	10	11	12	13	14	15	5^{2}	16	17	18	19	20	21	22	23	24	25	26	27	28	29	30	31	32	33
Ground	A	H	A	A	A	H	A	H	A	H	H	A	H	H	H	A	H	A	H	A	H	A	A	H	A	A	H	A	H	A	H	A	H
Result	L	D	W	W	W	D	D	D	D	W	W	W	L		P																		
Position	10	11	4	5	3	5	5	6	6	4	3	2	4																				
Points	0	1	4	7	10	11	12	13	14	17	20	23	23																				
Manager	B	B	B	B	B	B	B	B	B	B	B	B	B																				

Updated to match(es) played on 21 November 2026. Source:
Notes:
Manager: • B Borbély

^{1} Round 3 match (ETO Győr–Ferencváros) has been postponed after Round 6, to 3 September 2026.

^{2} Round 5 match (Ferencváros–Puskás Akadémia) has been postponed after Round 15, to 3 December 2026.

==== Matches ====
Win Draw Loss Fixtures Postponed

The draw for the 2026/27 season was held on 22 June 2026.

26 July 2026 1	Paks	4–2	Ferencváros	Paks
20:00 CEST	Papp (yellow card) 13'; Pető 24', 59'; J. Szalai 42', 55'; Windecker (yellow card) 76'; Győrfi (yellow card) 90+3'	Report	Yusuf 18'; Botka 32'	Stadium: Fehérvári úti Stadion; Attendance: 4,739; Referee: Ferenc Karakó; Assistant referees: Georgiou Theodoros, Péter Ország
Note: Ferencváros: Á. Varga — O. Nagy, Botka (c) (Rommens (substituted on) 68'), Zohoré, O'Dowda — Corbu (Gómez (substituted on) 46'), Kanichowsky — Gruber (Bagi (substituted on) 56'), Lisztes, Sz. Szabó (Acolatse (substituted on) 56') — Kovačević (Yusuf (substituted on) 3') • Manager: Borbély • Player of the match: József Szalai, Paks 8.6 • Best player of Ferencváros: Gabi Kanichowsky 7.6

2 August 2026 2	Ferencváros	0–0	Vasas	Budapest
17:30 CEST	Corbu (yellow card) 71'; Cadu (yellow card) 78'	Report	Hidi (yellow card) 5' (yellow-red card) 86'; J. Urblík (yellow card) 42'; Pávkovics (yellow card) 52'	Stadium: Groupama Aréna; Attendance: 7,987; Referee: Tamás Bognár; Assistant referees: Péter Kóbor, Viktor Nagy
Note: Ferencváros: Dibusz (c) — Osváth, Raemaekers, Zohoré, Cadu — Rommens, Corbu (Kanichowsky (substituted on) 81') — Sevikyan (Zachariassen (substituted on) 46'), Lisztes (Gruber (substituted on) 46'), Bagi (Z. Varga (substituted on) 46') — Yusuf (Joseph (substituted on) 60') • Manager: Borbély • Player of the match: Philippe Rommens, Ferencváros 8.0 • Best player of Vasas: Áron Doktorics 8.0

17 August 2026 4	Zalaegerszeg	0–1	Ferencváros	Zalaegerszeg
17:30 CEST	Richards (yellow card) 87'; Penalba (yellow card) 90+4'	Report	Corbu (yellow card) 18' (goal) 38'; O'Dowda (yellow card) 87'	Stadium: ZTE Arena; Attendance: 6,052; Referee: Bence Csonka dr. Assistant referees: Georgiou Theodoros, Péter Ország
Note: Ferencváros: Dibusz (c) — Osváth, Gómez, Zohoré, Cadu — Á. Nagy (Rommens (substituted on) 90+1'), Kanichowsky (O'Dowda (substituted on) 62'), Corbu — Zachariassen, Joseph (Kodro (substituted on) 90+3'), Z. Varga (Yusuf (substituted on) 62') • Manager: Borbély • Player of the match: Dénes Dibusz, Ferencváros 8.2 • Best player of Zalaegerszeg: Bence Gundel-Takács 7.9

30 August 2026 6	Puskás Akadémia	1–2	Ferencváros	Felcsút
19:00 CEST	Orján (yellow card) 48'; Arutyunyan 58'; Colley (yellow card) 90'	Report	Cadu (yellow card) 24'; Zachariassen 53' (yellow card) 88'; Lisztes 63' (yellow card) 81'; Raemaekers (penalty missed) 78'	Stadium: Pancho Aréna; Attendance: 3,789; Referee: Péter Antal; Assistant referees: Balázs Szert, Péter Ország
Note: Ferencváros: Dibusz (c) — Osváth, Raemaekers, Gómez, Cadu — Á. Nagy, Corbu – Z. Varga (Yusuf (substituted on) 46'), Zachariassen (N. Keïta (substituted on) 89'), Arzani (O'Dowda (substituted on) 67') — Joseph (Lisztes (substituted on) 14') • Manager: Borbély • Player of the match: Bamidele Yusuf, Ferencváros 7.7 • Best player of Puskás Akadémia: Bendegúz Lehoczki 7.7

3 September 2026 3	ETO Győr	0–3	Ferencváros	Győr
19:30 CEST	Szép (yellow card) 31'; Huszár (yellow card) 79'; Kulenović (penalty missed) 90+1'	Report	Bagi 27'; Corbu (yellow card) 49'; Gómez 70'; Lisztes 72'	Stadium: ETO Park; Attendance: 8,703; Referee: Bence Csonka dr. Assistant referees: Ákos Berényi, Dávid Rózsa
Note: Ferencváros: Dibusz (c) — O. Nagy, Raemaekers, Gómez, Cadu — Á. Nagy, Corbu (N. Keïta (substituted on) 63') — Yusuf (Z. Varga (substituted on) 81'), Zachariassen (Levi (substituted on) 81'), Arzani (Birmančević (substituted on) 70') — Bagi (Lisztes (substituted on) 63') • Manager: Borbély • Player of the match: Mariano Gómez, Ferencváros 7.9 • Best player of ETO Győr: Željko Gavrić 7.1

6 September 2026 7	Ferencváros	2–2	Újpest	Budapest
17:45 CEST	Yusuf 20'; Raemaekers (yellow card) 23'; Zachariassen 44' (yellow card) 85'; Yusuf (yellow card) 90+1'	Report	Mi. Mucsányi (yellow card) 8'; Stronati 45+1'; Matko 55'; Ljujić (yellow card) 86' (On the bench)	Stadium: Groupama Aréna; Attendance: 20,107; Referee: Ferenc Karakó; Assistant referees: Vencel Tóth II, Balázs Buzás
Note: Ferencváros: Dibusz (c) — Osváth, Raemaekers, Gómez, Cadu — Á. Nagy (N. Keïta (substituted on) 65'), Corbu — Zachariassen, Bagi (Lisztes (substituted on) 46'), Arzani (Birmančević (substituted on) 65') — Yusuf • Manager: Borbély (yellow card) 90+4' • Player of the match: Bamidele Yusuf, Ferencváros 8.3 • Best player of Újpest: Matija Ljujić 7.6

20 September 2026 8	Nyíregyháza	1–1	Ferencváros	Nyíregyháza
19:30 CEST	Hős 7'; M. Kovács (yellow card) 38'; Regža (yellow card) 47'; Jovanov (yellow card) 80'; Kvasina (yellow card) 85'	Report	Gómez 59'; Raemaekers (yellow card) 85'; Á. Nagy (yellow card) 87'	Stadium: Városi Stadion; Attendance: 7,168; Referee: Tamás Bognár; Assistant referees: Péter Kóbor, Dávid Rózsa
Note: Ferencváros: Á. Varga — Osváth, Lakatos (Gómez (substituted on) 46'), Raemaekers, O'Dowda — N. Keïta (c) (Á. Nagy (substituted on) 85') — Yusuf (Bero (substituted on) 85'), Zachariassen, Corbu, Arzani (Birmančević (substituted on) 72') — Lisztes (Kovačević (substituted on) 72') • Manager: Borbély • Player of the match: Zsombor Hős, Nyíregyháza 8.2 • Best player of Ferencváros: Mariano Gómez 8.2

10 October 2026 9	Ferencváros	1–1	Debrecen	Budapest
17:00 CEST	Yusuf (yellow card) 5'; Corbu 65'; Gómez (yellow card) 89'	Report	Meíjas (yellow card) 25'; D. Kocsis (yellow card) 77'; Dzsudzsák 90+5' (pen.)	Stadium: Groupama Aréna; Attendance: 11,593; Referee: Balázs Berke; Assistant referees: Georgiou Theodoros, Péter Ország
Note: Ferencváros: Dibusz (c) — O. Nagy, Raemaekers, Gómez, Cadu — Á. Nagy, Corbu — Yusuf (Birmančević (substituted on) 73'), Zachariassen, Arzani (Lisztes (substituted on) 58') — Bagi (Kovačević (substituted on) 58' (substituted off) 81' (O'Dowda (substituted on) 81')) • Manager: Borbély (yellow card) 89' • Player of the match: Marius Corbu, Ferencváros 8.3 • Best player of Debrecen: Blaž Bošković 7.3

18 October 2026 10	Kisvárda	1–1	Ferencváros	Kisvárda
18:00 CEST	Novothny (penalty missed) 4'; Melnyk 33' (yellow card) 66'; Mešanović (yellow card) 85'	Report	O'Dowda 75'	Stadium: Várkerti Stadion; Attendance: 2,971; Referee: Gergő Bogár; Assistant referees: Balázs Buzás, József Aradi
Note: Ferencváros: Radnóti — Osváth, Gómez, Raemaekers, O'Dowda — Maïga (Á. Nagy (substituted on) 88') — Arzani (Cadu (substituted on) 83'), Corbu, Zachariassen (c), Levi (Birmančević (substituted on) 67') — Lisztes (Yusuf (substituted on) 46') • Manager: Borbély • Player of the match: Jonathan Levi, Ferencváros 8.3 • Best player of Debrecen: Bohdan Melnyk 7.9

25 October 2026 11	Ferencváros	5–0	MTK	Budapest
18:00 CET	Maïga (yellow card) 5' (goal) 15', 20'; Yusuf 16'; Zachariassen 52' (pen.); Gómez (yellow card) 61'; Corbu 68'; Cadu (yellow card) 90'	Report	Kata (yellow card) 60'	Stadium: Groupama Aréna; Attendance: 7,690; Referee: Márton Rúsz; Assistant referees: Gergő Vígh-Tarsonyi, Gergely Becséri
Note: Ferencváros: Dibusz (c) — Osváth, Raemaekers, Gómez, Cadu — Maïga (Á. Nagy (substituted on) 58') — Zachariassen (Levi (substituted on) 73'), Madarász (Bagi (substituted on) 73'), Corbu, Birmančević (Arzani (substituted on) 81') — Yusuf (Joseph (substituted on) 58') • Manager: Borbély • Player of the match: Habib Maïga, Ferencváros 8.9 • Best player of MTK: Mihály Kata 7.1

1 November 2026 12	Ferencváros	2–0	Paks	Budapest
16:00 CET	Yusuf 59' (yellow card) 70'; Zachariassen 90+4'	Report	Lenzsér (yellow card) 49'	Stadium: Groupama Aréna; Attendance: 8,629; Referee: Gergő Bogár; Assistant referees: István Albert, Bence Belicza
Note: Ferencváros: Dibusz (c) — Osváth, Raemaekers, Gómez, Cadu — Madarász (Bero (substituted on) 71'), Maïga (Á. Nagy (substituted on) 80') — Zachariassen, Corbu, Birmančević (Levi (substituted on) 89') — Yusuf (Joseph (substituted on) 71') • Manager: Borbély • Player of the match: Attila Osváth, Ferencváros 8.3 • Best player of Paks: Bence Lenzsér and Ákos Kinyik 7.5 each

8 November 2026 13	Vasas	0–2	Ferencváros	Budapest
19:00 CET	Pálinkás (yellow card) 44'	Report	Osváth (yellow card) 22'; Madarász (yellow card) 62'; Maïga 65'; Bero 84'	Stadium: Illovszky Rudolf Stadion; Attendance: 4,221; Referee: Ferenc Karakó; Assistant referees: Vencel Tóth II, Péter Ország
Note: Ferencváros: Dibusz (c) — Osváth, Gómez, Raemaekers, Cadu — Maïga, Madarász (Bero (substituted on) 64') — Zachariassen (Levi (substituted on) 84'), Corbu (Á. Nagy (substituted on) 90'), Birmančević (Arzani (substituted on) 84') — Yusuf (Joseph (substituted on) 64') • Manager: Borbély • Player of the match: Habib Maïga, Ferencváros 8.2 • Best player of Vasas: Botond Baráth and Jozef Urblík 7.8 each

21 November 2026 14	Ferencváros	1–3	ETO Győr	Budapest
18:30 CET	Yusuf 56'	Report	Kulenović 1', 68'; Ricardo (yellow card) 77'; Bennette 90+4'	Stadium: Groupama Aréna; Attendance: 11,547; Referee: Bence Csonka dr. Assistant referees: Vencel Tóth II, Norbert Bornemissza
Note: Ferencváros: Dibusz (c) — Osváth, Raemaekers, Gómez, O. Nagy — Maïga (Kovačević (substituted on) 85'), Madarász (Corbu (substituted on) 46') — Zachariassen, Bero, Birmančević (Arzani (substituted on) 69') — Yusuf (Joseph (substituted on) 69') • Manager: Borbély • Player of the match: Luka Kulenović, ETO Győr 9.0 • Best player of Ferencváros: Habib Maïga 7.6

29 November 2026 15	Ferencváros	v	Zalaegerszeg	Budapest
14:15 CET				Stadium: Groupama Aréna

3 December 2026 5	Ferencváros	v	Kispest-Honvéd	Budapest
17:45 CET				Stadium: Groupama Aréna

6 December 2026 16	Kispest-Honvéd	v	Ferencváros	Budapest
19:00 CET				Stadium: Bozsik Aréna

14 December 2026 17	Ferencváros	v	Puskás Akadémia	Budapest
19:30 CET				Stadium: Groupama Aréna

19 December 2026 18	Újpest	v	Ferencváros	Budapest
18:30 CET				Stadium: Szusza Ferenc Stadion

30 January 2027 19	Ferencváros	v	Nyíregyháza	Budapest
TBD				Stadium: Groupama Aréna

6 February 2027 20	Debrecen	v	Ferencváros	Debrecen
TBD				Stadium: Nagyerdei Stadion

13 February 2027 21	Ferencváros	v	Kisvárda	Budapest
TBD				Stadium: Groupama Aréna

20 February 2027 22	MTK	v	Ferencváros	Budapest
TBD				Stadium: Hidegkuti Nándor Stadion

27 February 2027 23	Paks	v	Ferencváros	Paks
TBD				Stadium: Fehérvári úti Stadion

6 March 2027 24	Ferencváros	v	Vasas	Budapest
TBD				Stadium: Groupama Aréna

13 March 2027 25	ETO Győr	v	Ferencváros	Győr
TBD				Stadium: ETO Park

20 March 2027 26	Zalaegerszeg	v	Ferencváros	Zalaegerszeg
TBD				Stadium: ZTE Arena

3 April 2027 27	Ferencváros	v	Kispest-Honvéd	Budapest
TBD				Stadium: Groupama Aréna

10 April 2027 28	Puskás Akadémia	v	Ferencváros	Felcsút
TBD				Stadium: Pancho Aréna

17 April 2027 29	Ferencváros	v	Újpest	Budapest
TBD				Stadium: Groupama Aréna

24 April 2027 30	Nyíregyháza	v	Ferencváros	Nyíregyháza
TBD				Stadium: Városi Stadion

1 May 2027 31	Ferencváros	v	Debrecen	Budapest
TBD				Stadium: Groupama Aréna

15 May 2027 32	Kisvárda	v	Ferencváros	Kisvárda
TBD				Stadium: Várkerti Stadion

22 May 2027 33	Ferencváros	v	MTK	Budapest
TBD				Stadium: Groupama Aréna

Note: Round 3, ETO Győr vs Ferencváros match: On 8th August 2026, Ferencváros will play a friendly match against Real Madrid, so the Competition Committee of Hungarian Football Association has approved postponing the match to a later date.
Source: MLSZ Adatbank

=== Magyar Kupa ===
Win Draw Loss Fixtures Postponed

==== Round of 64 ====
In the first round, DEAC won 3–1 at home against Eger, a fellow third-division side. In the second round, they defeated the fifth-division team Kartal 5–0 away.

12 September 2026 R64	DEAC (NB III)	0–7	Ferencváros	Debrecen
13:00 CEST	Maruscsák (yellow card) 58'	Report	Bero 1', 7', 63'; Cs. Lakatos 12' (yellow card) 46'; Kovačević 38'; Zachariassen 78' (pen.); Levi 89' (pen.)	Stadium: DEAC Stadion; Attendance: 2,000; Referee: Bence Hanyecz; Assistant referees: István Albert, Gergő Vígh-Tarsonyi
Note: Ferencváros: Á. Varga — O. Nagy, Cs. Lakatos, Zohoré, O'Dowda (Osváth (substituted on) 83') — N. Keïta (Madarász (substituted on) 60'), Rommens — Levi, Bero (Maïga (substituted on) 68'), Birmančević (Zachariassen (substituted on) 68') — Kovačević (Bagi (substituted on) 60') • Manager: Borbély

==== Round of 32 ====
28 October 2026 R32	Bicske (NB III)	1–4	Ferencváros	Bicske
12:30 CET	Király 17'	Report	Fodor 5' (o.g.); Rommens (yellow card) 16'; Levi 60'; Arzani 62'; Yusuf 86'	Stadium: Sportpálya; Attendance: 1,800; Referee: Tamás Ujhelyi; Assistant referees: Ákos Berényi, Levente Balla
Note: Ferencváros: Á. Varga — O. Nagy, Raemaekers (c), Zohoré, Cadu (Osváth (substituted on) 79') — Á. Nagy — Levi, Bagi (Bero (substituted on) 46'), Rommens (Corbu (substituted on) 61'), Arzani (Birmančević (substituted on) 79') — Joseph (Yusuf (substituted on) 61') • Manager: Borbély

==== Round of 16 ====
10 February 2027 R16	PMFC (NB III)	v	Ferencváros	Pécs
TBC				Stadium: Stadion PMFC

=== UEFA Europa League ===
Win Draw Loss Fixtures Postponed

==== First qualifying round ====
The draw for the first qualifying round was held on 16 June 2026.

9 July 2026 1st leg	Vojvodina (Football Association of Serbia)	1–2	(Hungarian Football Federation) Ferencváros	Novi Sad, Serbia (Football Association of Serbia)
20:00 CEST	Raemaekers 45' (o.g.); Petrović (yellow card) 59'	Report	Zachariassen 8'; Yusuf (yellow card) 67' (goal) 86'; Joseph (yellow card) 71'	Stadium: Karađorđe Stadium; Attendance: 6,557; Referee: Mathieu Vernice (France); Assistant referees: Aurélien Drouet, Florian Goncalves De Araujo
Note: Ferencváros: Dibusz (c) — Osváth, Raemaekers, Gómez, Cadu — Kanichowsky (Levi (substituted on) 90+3'), N. Keïta, Corbu (Rommens (substituted on) 90') — Zachariassen (Acolatse (substituted on) 90'), Yusuf (Gruber (substituted on) 90'), Lisztes (Joseph (substituted on) 46') • Manager: Borbély

16 July 2026 2nd leg	Ferencváros (Hungarian Football Federation)	3–0 (5–1 agg.)	(Football Association of Serbia) Vojvodina	Budapest, Hungary
20:15 CEST	Joseph 27'; Zachariassen 34'; Cadu (yellow card) 69'; Gruber 71'; N. Keïta (yellow card) 88'	Report	Szűcs (red card) 9'; Đakovac (yellow card) 82'	Stadium: Groupama Aréna; Attendance: 13,901; Referee: Vitālijs Spasjoņņikovs (Latvia); Assistant referees: Raimonds Tatriks, Diana Vanaga
Note: Ferencváros: Dibusz (c) — Osváth (O. Nagy (substituted on) 82'), Gómez, Raemaekers, Cadu — Kanichowsky (Gruber (substituted on) 61'), N. Keïta, Corbu — Zachariassen (Lisztes (substituted on) 74'), Joseph (Sevikyan (substituted on) 74'), Yusuf (Acolatse (substituted on) 60') • Manager: Borbély

Ferencváros won 5–1 on aggregate.

==== Second qualifying round ====
23 July 2026 1st leg	Twente (Royal Dutch Football Association)	1–2	(Hungarian Football Federation) Ferencváros	Enschede, Netherlands
20:00 CEST	Adelgaard 38'	Report	Joseph 14', 80'	Stadium: De Grolsch Veste; Attendance: 27,500; Referee: Damian Kos (Poland); Assistant referees: Bartosz Heinig, Dariusz Bohonos
Note: Ferencváros: Dibusz (c) — Osváth, Gómez, Raemaekers, Cadu — Rommens, Kanichowsky (Levi (substituted on) 69'), Corbu — Zachariassen (O. Nagy (substituted on) 90+1'), Yusuf (O'Dowda (substituted on) 69'), Joseph (Lisztes (substituted on) 87') • Manager: Borbély

30 July 2026 2nd leg	Ferencváros (Hungarian Football Federation)	2–2 (4–3 agg.)	(Royal Dutch Football Association) Twente	Budapest, Hungary
20:30 CEST	Raemaekers 22' (pen.); Rommens (red card) 34'; Joseph 50'; Cadu (yellow card) 57'	Report	van den Belt (yellow card) 57'; Lemkin (yellow card) 61'; Weghorst 83'; Vennegoor of Hesselink 86'; Taha (yellow card) 88'	Stadium: Groupama Aréna; Attendance: 17,201; Referee: Viktor Kopiievskyi (Ukraine); Assistant referees: Semen Shlonchak, Viktor Nyzhnyk
Note: Ferencváros: Dibusz (c) — Osváth, Gómez, Raemaekers, Cadu (Levi (substituted on) 88') — Rommens, Kanichowsky — Zachariassen, Corbu, O'Dowda (Yusuf (substituted on) 73') — Joseph (Zohoré (substituted on) 78') • Manager: Borbély

Ferencváros won 4–3 on aggregate.

==== Third qualifying round ====
5 August 2026 1st leg	Ferencváros (Hungarian Football Federation)	1–0	(Polish Football Association) Górnik Zabrze	Budapest, Hungary
20:15 CEST	Corbu 65'	Report	Josema (yellow card) 10'	Stadium: Groupama Aréna; Attendance: 12,870; Referee: Javier Alberola Rojas (Spain); Assistant referees: Alfredo Rodriguez Moreno, Jorge Bueno Mateo
Note: Ferencváros: Dibusz (c) — Osváth, Gómez, Raemaekers, Cadu (Ćirković (substituted on) 90+1') — Corbu, Kanichowsky (Á. Nagy (substituted on) 83'), Levi (Arzani (substituted on) 70') — Zachariassen, Joseph (Kodro (substituted on) 90+1'), Yusuf (O'Dowda (substituted on) 70') • Manager: Borbély

13 August 2026 2nd leg	Górnik Zabrze (Polish Football Association)	1–1 (1–2 agg.)	(Hungarian Football Federation) Ferencváros	Zabrze, Poland
19:00 CEST	Urbański 45' (pen.)	Report	Osváth (yellow card) 26'; Rommens (yellow card) 44'; Sáček 82' (o.g.)	Stadium: Arena Zabrze; Attendance: 23,348; Referee: Andrea Colombo (Italy); Assistant referees: Giuseppe Perrotti, Vittorio Di Gioia
Note: Ferencváros: Dibusz (c) — Osváth, Gómez, Raemaekers, Cadu (Zohoré (substituted on) 90+3') — Corbu, Rommens (Á. Nagy (substituted on) 59') — Zachariassen, Kanichowsky (N. Keïta (substituted on) 59'), Yusuf — Joseph (Kodro (substituted on) 90+3') • Manager: Borbély

Ferencváros won 2–1 on aggregate.

==== Play-off round ====
20 August 2026 1st leg	Trabzonspor (Turkish Football Federation)	0–1	(Hungarian Football Federation) Ferencváros	Trabzon, Turkey
19:00 (20:00 UTC+3)	Nwaiwu (red card) 90+6'	Report	Zachariassen 17' (yellow card) 43'; Yusuf (yellow card) 29'; O. Nagy (yellow card) 50'; Osváth (yellow card) 89'; Kanichowsky (yellow card) 90+1'	Stadium: Şenol Güneş Sports Complex; Attendance: 32,569; Referee: Igor Pajač (Croatia); Assistant referees: Bojan Zobenica, Ivan Mihalj
Note: Ferencváros: Dibusz (c) — O. Nagy, Raemaekers, Gómez, Cadu (Zohoré (substituted on) 88') — Yusuf (Á. Nagy (substituted on) 61'), Rommens (Kanichowsky (substituted on) 61'), Corbu, O'Dowda — Zachariassen (Osváth (substituted on) 78') — Joseph (Lisztes (substituted on) 78') • Manager: Borbély

27 August 2026 2nd leg	Ferencváros (Hungarian Football Federation)	4–0 (5–0 agg.)	(Turkish Football Federation) Trabzonspor	Budapest, Hungary
20:30 CEST	O'Dowda 19'; Corbu 54'; Yusuf 59' (pen.); Lisztes 86' (yellow card) 88'	Report	Malinovskyi (red card) 13'; Savić (yellow card) 14'; Lopes Cabral (yellow card) 32' (yellow-red card) 57'; Onana (yellow card) 58'	Stadium: Groupama Aréna; Attendance: 21,011; Referee: Rade Obrenović (Slovenia); Assistant referees: Jure Praprotnik, Grega Kordež
Note: Ferencváros: Dibusz (c) — Cadu, Gómez, Raemaekers, O. Nagy — Corbu (N. Keïta (substituted on) 83'), Á. Nagy (Arzani (substituted on) 78'), Zachariassen — O'Dowda (Lakatos (substituted on) 78'), Yusuf (Z. Varga (substituted on) 70'), Joseph (Lisztes (substituted on) 70') • Manager: Borbély

Ferencváros won 5–0 on aggregate.

==== League phase ====
The draw for the league phase pairings was held at the Grimaldi Forum in Monaco on 28 August 2026, 13:00 CEST.

Opponents: (Italy) Juventus, (Italy) Milan, (Czech Republic) Viktoria Plzeň, (Scotland) Celtic, (Slovenia) Celje, (Poland) Lech Poznań, (Portugal) Torreense, (Germany) TSG Hoffenheim

===== League phase table =====
Pos	Team	Pld	W	D	L	GF	GA	GD	Pts	Qualification
1	(Portugal) Benfica	4	4	0	0	13	3	+10	12	Advance to round of 16 (seeded)
2	(England) Bournemouth	4	4	0	0	11	2	+9	12	Advance to round of 16 (seeded)
3	(Hungary) Ferencváros	4	4	0	0	11	3	+8	12	Advance to round of 16 (seeded)
4	(Belgium) Union Saint-Gilloise	4	3	1	0	10	2	+8	10	Advance to round of 16 (seeded)
5	(Italy) Juventus	4	3	1	0	11	4	+7	10	Advance to round of 16 (seeded)

Updated to match(es) played on 5 November 2026. Source: UEFA
Rules for classification: League phase tiebreakers

Schedule source:

Round	1	2	3	4	5	6	7	8
Ground	A	H	H	A	H	A	H	A
Result	W	W	W	W				
Position	6	7	4	3				
Points	3	6	9	12				

Updated to match(es) played on 5 November 2026. Source: UEFA
A = Away; H = Home; W = Win; D = Draw; L = Loss

===== Matches =====
17 September 2026 1	Celtic (Scotland)	1–3	(Hungary) Ferencváros	Glasgow, Scotland
21:00 (20:00 UTC+1)	Baur 44'	Report	Scales 20' (o.g.); Zachariassen 45+1'; Arzani 47'; Levi (yellow card) 86'; Osváth (yellow card) 88'	Stadium: Celtic Park; Attendance: 48,223; Referee: Patrik Kolarić (Croatia); Assistant referees: Luka Pajić, Ivan Starčević
Note: Ferencváros: Á. Varga — O. Nagy (Osváth (substituted on) 46'), Raemaekers, Gómez (Zohoré (substituted on) 81'), Cadu — Corbu, Á. Nagy — Arzani (O'Dowda (substituted on) 66'), Zachariassen, Yusuf (Levi (substituted on) 66') — Bagi (Lisztes (substituted on) 70') • Manager: Borbély • Player of the match: Bamidele Yusuf, Ferencváros 9.0 • Best player of Celtic: Mika Baur 7.5

15 October 2026 2	Ferencváros (Hungary)	2–1	(Czech Republic) Viktoria Plzeň	Budapest
21:00 CEST	Osváth (yellow card) 7'; Zachariassen 49', 81' (pen.); Raemaekers (yellow card) 90+6'; Maïga (yellow card) 90+6'	Report	Višinský 90'; Červ (yellow card) 90+5'	Stadium: Groupama Aréna; Attendance: 16,686; Referee: Damian Sylwestrzak (Poland); Assistant referees: Paweł Sokolnicki, Adam Karasewicz
Note: Ferencváros: Radnóti — Osváth, Raemaekers, Gómez, Cadu — Corbu (Levi (substituted on) 90+1'), Á. Nagy — Yusuf (Maïga (substituted on) 84'), Zachariassen (c) (Madarász (substituted on) 90+1'), Birmančević (O'Dowda (substituted on) 84') — Lisztes (Arzani (substituted on) 64') • Manager: Borbély • Player of the match: Kristoffer Zachariassen, Ferencváros 8.8 • Best player of Viktoria Plzeň: Adam Gabriel 8.0

22 October 2026 3	Ferencváros (Hungary)	4–1	(Portugal) Torreense	Budapest
18:45 CEST	Zachariassen (yellow card) 9'; Yusuf 20' (yellow card) 68'; Gómez 58'; Corbu (yellow card) 76'; Diadié 80' (o.g.); Lisztes 90'; O. Nagy (yellow card) 90+1'	Report	Alfaro (yellow card) 17'; Mutombo (yellow card) 19'; Pozo 23'	Stadium: Groupama Aréna; Attendance: 15,973; Referee: Jérôme Brisard (France); Assistant referees: Alexis Auger, Aurélien Berthomieu
Note: Ferencváros: Radnóti — O. Nagy, Gómez, Zohoré, O'Dowda — Á. Nagy, Madarász (Corbu (substituted on) 57') — Arzani (Maïga (substituted on) 75'), Zachariassen (c) (Levi (substituted on) 87'), Birmančević (Lisztes (substituted on) 87') — Yusuf (Joseph (substituted on) 75') • Manager: Borbély • Player of the match: Veljko Birmančević, Ferencváros 8.0 • Best player of Torreense: Manu Pozo 7.3

5 November 2026 4	Milan (Italy)	0–2	(Hungary) Ferencváros	Milan, Italy
18:45 CET	Cisse (yellow card) 32'; De Winter (yellow card) 51'	Report	Joseph 52', 66'; Yusuf (yellow card) 77' (red card); Á. Nagy (yellow card) 90+4'	Stadium: San Siro; Attendance: 49,372; Referee: Urs Schnyder (Switzerland); Assistant referees: Marco Zürcher, Benjamin Zürcher
Note: Ferencváros: Dibusz (c) – Osváth, Raemaekers, Gómez, Cadu – Bero (Madarász (substituted on) 67'), Á. Nagy, Corbu (Arzani (substituted on) 90+3') – Zachariassen (Maïga (substituted on) 86'), Joseph (Yusuf (substituted on) 67'), Birmančević (Levi (substituted on) 86') • Manager: Borbély • Player of the match: Lenny Joseph, Ferencváros 8.3 • Best player of Milan: Lorenzo Torriani 8.0

26 November 2026 5	Ferencváros (Hungary)	v	(Slovenia) Celje	Budapest
21:00 CET		Report		Stadium: Groupama Aréna

10 December 2026 6	Lech Poznań (Poland)	v	(Hungary) Ferencváros	Poznań, Poland
21:00 CET		Report		Stadium: Poznań Stadium

21 January 2027 7	Ferencváros (Hungary)	v	(Italy) Juventus	Budapest
18:45 CET		Report		Stadium: Groupama Aréna

28 January 2027 8	TSG Hoffenheim (Germany)	v	(Hungary) Ferencváros	Sinsheim, Germany
21:00 CET		Report		Stadium: Rhein-Neckar-Arena

== Statistics ==
As of match played 21 November 2026

=== Goal scorers ===
Includes all competitions for senior teams. The list is sorted by squad number when season-total goals are equal. Players with no goals not included in the list.
We indicate in parentheses how many of the goals scored by the player from penalties.

Rank	No.	Pos.	Player	Nemzeti Bajnokság I (Domestic league)	Magyar Kupa (Domestic cup)	UEFA Europa League	Season total	Ref.
1	16	FW	(Norway) Kristoffer Zachariassen	4 (1)	1 (1)	6 (1)	11 (3)	
2	11	FW	(Nigeria) Bamidele Yusuf	5	1	3 (1)	9 (1)	
3	75	FW	(Haiti) Lenny Joseph	0	0	6	6	
4	17	MF	(Romania) Marius Corbu	3	0	2	5	
5	22	FW	(Slovakia) Matúš Bero	1	3	0	4	
5	76	FW	(Hungary) Krisztián Lisztes	2	0	2	4	
7	4	DF	(Argentina) Mariano Gómez	2	0	1	3	
7	80	MF	(Ivory Coast) Habib Maïga	3	0	0	3	
9	10	FW	(Sweden) Jonathan Levi	0	2 (1)	0	2 (1)	
9	15	FW	(Australia) Daniel Arzani	0	1	1	2	
9	47	MF	(Republic of Ireland) Callum O'Dowda	1	0	1	2	
12	18	MF	(Hungary) Ádám Bagi	1	0	0	1	
12	19	FW	(Croatia) Franko Kovačević	0	1	0	1	
12	21	DF	(Hungary) Endre Botka	1	0	0	1	
12	28	DF	(Belgium) Toon Raemaekers	0	0	1 (1)	1 (1)	
12	30	FW	(Hungary) Zsombor Gruber^{1}	0	0	1	1	
12	71	DF	(Hungary) Csongos Lakatos	0	1	0	1	
Own goals				0	1	3	4	
Total				23 (0)	11 (2)	27 (3)	61 (5)	

^{1} Zsombor Gruber was transferred to La Louvière during the summer transfer window.

=== Hat-tricks ===
Player	Against	Result	Goals	Date	Competition	Ref.
Matúš Bero	DEAC (A)	7–0	1', 7', 63'	12 September 2026	Magyar Kupa, Round of 64	

Note: (H) – Home; (A) – Away
^{4} – player scored 4 goals; ^{5} – player scored 5 goals; ^{6} – player scored 6 goals

=== Penalties ===
Date	Penalty Taker	Scored	Opponent	Competition
30 July 2026	(Belgium) Toon Raemaekers	Yes	(Royal Dutch Football Association) Twente (H)	UEFA Europa League, Second qualifying round, Second leg
27 August 2026	(Nigeria) Bamidele Yusuf	Yes	(Turkish Football Federation) Trabzonspor (H)	UEFA Europa League, Play-off round, Second leg
30 August 2026	(Belgium) Toon Raemaekers	No	(Hungarian Football Federation) Puskás Akadémia (A)	Nemzeti Bajnokság I, Round 6
12 September 2026	(Sweden) Jonathan Levi	Yes	(Hungarian Football Federation) DEAC (A)	Magyar Kupa, Round of 64
12 September 2026	(Norway) Kristoffer Zachariassen	Yes	(Hungarian Football Federation) DEAC (A)	Magyar Kupa, Round of 64
15 October 2026	(Norway) Kristoffer Zachariassen	Yes	(Football Association of the Czech Republic) Viktoria Plzeň (H)	UEFA Europa League, League phase, Matchday 2
25 October 2026	(Norway) Kristoffer Zachariassen	Yes	(Hungarian Football Federation) MTK (H)	Nemzeti Bajnokság I, Round 11

Note: (H) – Home; (A) – Away

== See also ==
- List of Ferencvárosi TC seasons
- Ferencvárosi TC in European football
- List of Ferencvárosi TC managers
- Ferencvárosi TC–Újpest FC rivalry: local derby between Ferencváros and Újpest
- Örökrangadó: local derby between Ferencváros and MTK Budapest
