= Ferencvárosi TC in European football =

Hungarian professional football club

- Club: Ferencvárosi TC
- First entry: 1901–02 Challenge Cup (UEFA-non organised); 1960–61 European Cup Winners' Cup
- Latest entry: 2026–27 UEFA Europa League

Titles
- Inter-Cities Fairs Cup: 1: 1965

Ferencvárosi TC is a Hungarian professional football club based in Ferencváros, Budapest. Ferencváros has been the most successful Hungarian club in European football competitions having won the 1964–65 Inter-Cities Fairs Cup.

Ferencváros became the first Hungarian club to enter the group stages of the UEFA Champions League in the 1995–96 season.

== Matches ==
Ferencváros score listed first.

=== UEFA-organised seasonal competitions ===
==== European Cup and Champions League ====
| Season | Round | Opposition | Home | Away | Aggregate |
|---|---|---|---|---|---|
| 1963–64 | Preliminary round | (Turkey) Galatasaray | 2–0 | 0–4 | 2–4 |
| 1965–66 | Preliminary round | (Iceland) Keflavík | 9–1 | 4–1 | 13–2 |
| 1965–66 | First round | (Greece) Panathinaikos | 0–0 | 3–1 | 3–1 |
| 1965–66 | Quarter-finals | (Italy) Internazionale | 1–1 | 0–4 | 1–5 |
| 1968–69 | First round | (Bulgaria) Levski Sofia | —N/a | —N/a | w/d |
| 1969–70 | First round | (Bulgaria) CSKA September Flag | 4–1 | 1–2 | 5–3 |
| 1969–70 | Second round | (England) Leeds United | 0–3 | 0–3 | 0–6 |
| 1976–77 | First round | (Luxembourg) Jeunesse Esch | 5–1 | 6–2 | 11–3 |
| 1976–77 | Second round | (East Germany) Dynamo Dresden | 1–0 | 0–4 | 1–4 |
| 1981–82 | First round | (Czechoslovakia) Baník Ostrava | 3–2 | 0–3 | 3–5 |
| 1992–93 | First round | (Czechoslovakia) Slovan Bratislava | 0–0 | 1–4 | 1–4 |
| 1995–96 | Qualifying round | (Belgium) Anderlecht | 1–1 | 1–0 | 2–1 |
| 1995–96 | Group D | (Switzerland) Grasshopper | 3–3 | 3–0 | 3rd of 4 |
| 1995–96 | Group D | (Netherlands) Ajax | 1–5 | 0–4 | 3rd of 4 |
| 1995–96 | Group D | (Spain) Real Madrid | 1–1 | 1–6 | 3rd of 4 |
| 1996–97 | Qualifying round | (Sweden) IFK Göteborg | 1–1 | 0–3 | 1–4 |
| 2001–02 | Second qualifying round | (Croatia) Hajduk Split | 0–0 | 0–0 | 0–0 (4–5 p) |
| 2004–05 | Second qualifying round | (Albania) Tirana | 0–1 | 3–2 | 3–3 (a) |
| 2004–05 | Third qualifying round | (Czech Republic) Sparta Prague | 1–0 | 0–2 (a.e.t.) | 1–2 |
| 2016–17 | Second qualifying round | (Albania) Partizani | 1–1 | 1–1 | 2–2 (1–3 p) |
| 2019−20 | First qualifying round | (Bulgaria) Ludogorets Razgrad | 2–1 | 3–2 | 5–3 |
| 2019−20 | Second qualifying round | (Malta) Valletta | 3–1 | 1–1 | 4–2 |
| 2019−20 | Third qualifying round | (Croatia) Dinamo Zagreb | 0–4 | 1−1 | 1–5 |
| 2020–21 | First qualifying round | (Sweden) Djurgårdens IF | 2–0 | —N/a | —N/a |
| 2020–21 | Second qualifying round | (Scotland) Celtic | —N/a | 2–1 | —N/a |
| 2020–21 | Third qualifying round | (Croatia) Dinamo Zagreb | 2–1 | —N/a | —N/a |
| 2020–21 | Play-off round | (Norway) Molde | 0–0 | 3–3 | 3–3 (a) |
| 2020–21 | Group G | (Italy) Juventus | 1–4 | 1–2 | 4th of 4 |
| 2020–21 | Group G | (Spain) Barcelona | 0–3 | 1–5 | 4th of 4 |
| 2020–21 | Group G | (Ukraine) Dynamo Kyiv | 2–2 | 0–1 | 4th of 4 |
| 2021–22 | First qualifying round | (Kosovo) Prishtina | 3–0 | 3–1 | 6–1 |
| 2021–22 | Second qualifying round | (Lithuania) Žalgiris | 2–0 | 3–1 | 5−1 |
| 2021–22 | Third qualifying round | (Czech Republic) Slavia Prague | 2–0 | 0–1 | 2−1 |
| 2021–22 | Play-off round | (Switzerland) Young Boys | 2–3 | 2–3 | 4–6 |
| 2022–23 | First qualifying round | (Kazakhstan) Tobol | 5–1 | 0–0 | 5–1 |
| 2022–23 | Second qualifying round | (Slovakia) Slovan Bratislava | 1–2 | 4–1 | 5–3 |
| 2022–23 | Third qualifying round | (Azerbaijan) Qarabağ | 1–3 | 1–1 | 2–4 |
| 2023–24 | First qualifying round | (Faroe Islands) KÍ | 0–3 | 0–0 | 0–3 |
| 2024–25 | Second qualifying round | (Wales) The New Saints | 5–0 | 2–1 | 7–1 |
| 2024–25 | Third qualifying round | (Denmark) Midtjylland | 1–1 | 0–2 | 1–3 |
| 2025–26 | Second qualifying round | (Armenia) Noah | 4–3 | 2–1 | 6–4 |
| 2025–26 | Third qualifying round | (Bulgaria) Ludogorets Razgrad | 3–0 | 0–0 | 3–0 |
| 2025–26 | Play-off round | (Azerbaijan) Qarabağ | 1–3 | 3–2 | 4–5 |

==== European Cup Winners' Cup ====
| Season | Round | Opposition | Home | Away | Aggregate |
|---|---|---|---|---|---|
| 1960–61 | Preliminary round | (Scotland) Rangers | 2–1 | 2–4 | 4–5 |
| 1972–73 | First round | (Malta) Floriana | 6–0 | 0–1 | 6–1 |
| 1972–73 | Second round | (Czechoslovakia) Sparta Prague | 2–0 | 1–4 | 3–4 |
| 1974–75 | First round | (Wales) Cardiff City | 2–0 | 4–1 | 6–1 |
| 1974–75 | Second round | (England) Liverpool | 0–0 | 1–1 | 1–1 (a) |
| 1974–75 | Quarter-finals | (Sweden) Malmö FF | 1–1 | 3–1 | 4–2 |
| 1974–75 | Semi-finals | (Socialist Federal Republic of Yugoslavia) Red Star Belgrade | 2–1 | 2–2 | 4–3 |
| 1974–75 | Final | (Soviet Union) Dynamo Kyiv | 0–3 (N) | | |
| 1978–79 | First round | (Sweden) Kalmar FF | 2–0 | 2–2 | 4–2 |
| 1978–79 | Second round | (East Germany) 1. FC Magdeburg | 2–1 | 0–1 | 2–2 (a) |
| 1989–90 | First round | (Finland) Haka | 5–1 | 1–1 | 6–2 |
| 1989–90 | Second round | (Austria) Admira Wacker | 0–1 | 0–1 | 0–2 |
| 1991–92 | First round | (Bulgaria) Levski Sofia | 4–1 | 3–2 | 7–3 |
| 1991–92 | Second round | (Germany) Werder Bremen | 0–1 | 2–3 | 2–4 |
| 1993–94 | First round | (Austria) Wacker Innsbruck | 1–2 | 0–3 | 1–5 |
| 1994–95 | Qualifying round | (Luxembourg) F91 Dudelange | 6–1 | 6–1 | 12–2 |
| 1994–95 | First round | (Russia) CSKA Moscow | 2–1 | 1–2 | 3–3 (7–6 p) |
| 1994–95 | Second round | (Portugal) Porto | 2–0 | 0–6 | 2–6 |

==== UEFA Cup and Europa League ====
| Season | Round | Opposition | Home | Away | Aggregate |
|---|---|---|---|---|---|
| 1971–72 | First round | (Turkey) Fenerbahçe | 3–1 | 1–1 | 4–2 |
| 1971–72 | Second round | (Greece) Panionios | —N/a | —N/a | w/o |
| 1971–72 | Third round | (West Germany) Eintracht Braunschweig | 5–2 | 1–1 | 6–3 |
| 1971–72 | Quarter-finals | (Socialist Federal Republic of Yugoslavia) Željezničar | 1–2 | 2–1 | 3–3 (5–4 p) |
| 1971–72 | Semi-finals | (England) Wolverhampton Wanderers | 2–2 | 1–2 | 3–4 |
| 1973–74 | First round | (Poland) Gwardia Warszawa | 0–1 | 1–2 | 1–3 |
| 1977–78 | First round | (Bulgaria) Marek Dupnitsa | 2–0 | 0–3 | 2–3 |
| 1979–80 | First round | (Bulgaria) Lokomotiv Sofia | 2–0 | 0–3 | 2–3 |
| 1982–83 | First round | (Spain) Athletic Bilbao | 2–1 | 1–1 | 3–2 |
| 1982–83 | Second round | (Switzerland) Zürich | 1–1 | 0–1 | 1–2 |
| 1983–84 | First round | (Netherlands) PSV Eindhoven | 0–2 | 2–4 | 2–6 |
| 1990–91 | First round | (Belgium) Antwerpen | 3–1 (a.e.t.) | 0–0 | 3–1 |
| 1990–91 | Second round | (Denmark) Brøndby | 0–1 | 0–3 | 0–4 |
| 1996–97 | First round | (Greece) Olympiacos | 3–1 | 2–2 | 5–3 |
| 1996–97 | Second round | (England) Newcastle United | 3–2 | 0–4 | 3–6 |
| 1997–98 | First qualifying round | (Republic of Ireland) Bohemian | 5–0 | 1–0 | 6–0 |
| 1997–98 | Second qualifying round | (Sweden) Helsingborgs IF | 0–1 (a.e.t.) | 1–0 | 1–1 (4–3 p) |
| 1997–98 | First round | (Greece) OFI | 2–1 | 0–3 | 2–4 |
| 1998–99 | First qualifying round | (Andorra) Principat | 6–0 | 8–1 | 14–1 |
| 1998–99 | Second qualifying round | (Greece) AEK Athens | 4–2 | 0–4 | 4–6 |
| 1999–00 | Qualifying round | (Moldova) Constructorul Chișinău | 3–1 | 1–1 | 4–2 |
| 1999–00 | First round | (Czech Republic) Teplice | 1–1 | 1–3 | 2–4 |
| 2002–03 | Qualifying round | (Cyprus) AEL Limassol | 4–0 | 1–2 | 5–2 |
| 2002–03 | First round | (Turkey) Kocaelispor | 4–0 | 1–0 | 5–0 |
| 2002–03 | Second round | (Germany) VfB Stuttgart | 0–0 | 0–2 | 0–2 |
| 2003–04 | Qualifying round | (Malta) Birkirkara | 1–0 | 5–0 | 6–0 |
| 2003–04 | First round | (Denmark) Copenhagen | 1–1 | 1–1 (a.e.t.) | 2–2 (2–3 p) |
| 2004–05 | First round | (England) Millwall | 3–1 | 1–1 | 4–2 |
| 2004–05 | Group A | (Netherlands) Feyenoord | 1–1 | —N/a | 4th of 5 |
| 2004–05 | Group A | (Germany) Schalke 04 | —N/a | 0–2 | 4th of 5 |
| 2004–05 | Group A | (Switzerland) Basel | 1–2 | —N/a | 4th of 5 |
| 2004–05 | Group A | (Scotland) Heart of Midlothian | —N/a | 1–0 | 4th of 5 |
| 2005–06 | First qualifying round | (Belarus) MTZ-RIPO Minsk | 0–2 | 2–1 | 2–3 |
| 2011–12 | First qualifying round | (Armenia) Ulisses | 3–0 | 2–0 | 5–0 |
| 2011–12 | Second qualifying round | (Norway) Aalesunds | 2–1 | 1–3 (a.e.t.) | 3–4 |
| 2014–15 | First qualifying round | (Malta) Sliema Wanderers | 2–1 | 1–1 | 3–2 |
| 2014–15 | Second qualifying round | (Croatia) Rijeka | 1–2 | 0–1 | 1–3 |
| 2015–16 | First qualifying round | (Netherlands) Go Ahead Eagles | 4–1 | 1–1 | 5–2 |
| 2015–16 | Second qualifying round | (Bosnia and Herzegovina) Željezničar | 0–1 | 0–2 | 0–3 |
| 2017–18 | First qualifying round | (Latvia) Jelgava | 2–0 | 1–0 | 3–0 |
| 2017–18 | Second qualifying round | (Denmark) Midtjylland | 2–4 | 1–3 | 3–7 |
| 2018–19 | First qualifying round | (Israel) Maccabi Tel Aviv | 1−1 | 0–1 | 1–2 |
| 2019−20 | Play-off round | (Lithuania) Sūduva | 4−2 | 0−0 | 4−2 |
| 2019−20 | Group H | (Russia) CSKA Moscow | 0−0 | 1–0 | 3rd of 4 |
| 2019−20 | Group H | (Bulgaria) Ludogorets Razgrad | 0–3 | 1–1 | 3rd of 4 |
| 2019−20 | Group H | (Spain) Espanyol | 2–2 | 1–1 | 3rd of 4 |
| 2021−22 | Group G | (Germany) Bayer Leverkusen | 1–0 | 1–2 | 4th of 4 |
| 2021−22 | Group G | (Scotland) Celtic | 2–3 | 0–2 | 4th of 4 |
| 2021−22 | Group G | (Spain) Real Betis | 1–3 | 0–2 | 4th of 4 |
| 2022–23 | Play-off round | (Republic of Ireland) Shamrock Rovers | 4–0 | 0–1 | 4–1 |
| 2022–23 | Group | (Turkey) Trabzonspor | 3–2 | 0–1 | 1st of 4 |
| 2022–23 | Group | (France) Monaco | 1–1 | 1–0 | 1st of 4 |
| 2022–23 | Group | (Serbia) Red Star Belgrade | 2–1 | 1–4 | 1st of 4 |
| 2022–23 | Round of 16 | (Germany) Bayer Leverkusen | 0–2 | 0–2 | 0–4 |
| 2024–25 | Play-off round | (Bosnia and Herzegovina) Borac Banja Luka | 0–0 | 1–1 (a.e.t.) | 1–1 (3–2 p) |
| 2024–25 | League phase | (Belgium) Anderlecht | —N/a | 1–2 | 17th of 36 |
| 2024–25 | League phase | (England) Tottenham Hotspur | 1–2 | —N/a | 17th of 36 |
| 2024–25 | League phase | (France) Nice | 1–0 | —N/a | 17th of 36 |
| 2024–25 | League phase | (Ukraine) Dynamo Kyiv | —N/a | 4–0 | 17th of 36 |
| 2024–25 | League phase | (Sweden) Malmö FF | 4–1 | —N/a | 17th of 36 |
| 2024–25 | League phase | (Greece) PAOK | —N/a | 0–5 | 17th of 36 |
| 2024–25 | League phase | (Germany) Eintracht Frankfurt | —N/a | 0–2 | 17th of 36 |
| 2024–25 | League phase | (Netherlands) AZ | 4–3 | —N/a | 17th of 36 |
| 2024–25 | Knockout phase play-off | (Czech Republic) Viktoria Plzeň | 1–0 | 0–3 | 1–3 |
| 2025–26 | League phase | (Czech Republic) Viktoria Plzeň | 1–1 | —N/a | 12th of 36 |
| 2025–26 | League phase | (Belgium) Genk | —N/a | 1–0 | 12th of 36 |
| 2025–26 | League phase | (Austria) Red Bull Salzburg | —N/a | 3–2 | 12th of 36 |
| 2025–26 | League phase | (Bulgaria) Ludogorets Razgrad | 3–1 | —N/a | 12th of 36 |
| 2025–26 | League phase | (Turkey) Fenerbahçe | —N/a | 1–1 | 12th of 36 |
| 2025–26 | League phase | (Scotland) Rangers | 2–1 | —N/a | 12th of 36 |
| 2025–26 | League phase | (Greece) Panathinaikos | 1–1 | —N/a | 12th of 36 |
| 2025–26 | League phase | (England) Nottingham Forest | —N/a | 0–4 | 12th of 36 |
| 2025–26 | Knockout phase play-off | (Bulgaria) Ludogorets Razgrad | 2–0 | 1–2 | 3–2 |
| 2025–26 | Round of 16 | (Portugal) Braga | 2–0 | 0–4 | 2–4 |
| 2026–27 | First qualifying round | (Serbia) Vojvodina | 3–0 | 2–1 | 5–1 |
| 2026–27 | Second qualifying round | (Netherlands) Twente | 2–2 | 2–1 | 4–3 |
| 2026–27 | Third qualifying round | (Poland) Górnik Zabrze | 1–0 | 1–1 | 2–1 |
| 2026–27 | Play-off round | (Turkey) Trabzonspor | 4–0 | 1–0 | 5–0 |
| 2026–27 | League phase | (Scotland) Celtic | —N/a | 3–1 | 3rd of 36 |
| 2026–27 | League phase | (Czech Republic) Viktoria Plzeň | 2–1 | —N/a | 3rd of 36 |
| 2026–27 | League phase | (Portugal) Torreense | 4–1 | —N/a | 3rd of 36 |
| 2026–27 | League phase | (Italy) Milan | —N/a | 2–0 | 3rd of 36 |
| 2026–27 | League phase | (Slovenia) Celje | 26 Nov | —N/a | 3rd of 36 |
| 2026–27 | League phase | (Poland) Lech Poznań | —N/a | 10 Dec | 3rd of 36 |
| 2026–27 | League phase | (Italy) Juventus | 21 Jan | —N/a | 3rd of 36 |
| 2026–27 | League phase | (Germany) TSG Hoffenheim | —N/a | 28 Jan | 3rd of 36 |

==== Europa Conference League ====
| Season | Round | Opposition | Home | Away | Aggregate |
|---|---|---|---|---|---|
| 2023–24 | Second qualifying round | (Republic of Ireland) Shamrock Rovers | 4–0 | 2–0 | 6–0 |
| 2023–24 | Third qualifying round | (Malta) Ħamrun Spartans | 2–1 | 6–1 | 8–2 |
| 2023–24 | Play-off round | (Lithuania) Žalgiris | 3–0 | 4–0 | 7–0 |
| 2023–24 | Group F | (Italy) Fiorentina | 1–1 | 2–2 | 2nd of 4 |
| 2023–24 | Group F | (Belgium) Genk | 1–1 | 0–0 | 2nd of 4 |
| 2023–24 | Group F | (Serbia) Čukarički | 3–1 | 2–1 | 2nd of 4 |
| 2023–24 | Knockout round play-offs | (Greece) Olympiacos | 0–1 | 0–1 | 0–2 |

==== UEFA Intertoto Cup ====
| Season | Round | Opposition | Home | Away | Aggregate |
|---|---|---|---|---|---|
| 1984 | Group 9 | (Switzerland) Zürich | 3–0 | 0–1 | 3rd of 4 |
| 1984 | Group 9 | (Czechoslovakia) Spartak Trnava | 3–1 | 1–1 | 3rd of 4 |
| 1984 | Group 9 | Austria Klagenfurt | 0–0 | 2–3 | 3rd of 4 |
| 1986 | Group 11 | (Czechoslovakia) Slavia Prague | 0–1 | 0–2 | 4th of 4 |
| 1986 | Group 11 | (Austria) Sturm Graz | 0–1 | 5–1 | 4th of 4 |
| 1986 | Group 11 | (Switzerland) Luzern | 2–4 | 2–3 | 4th of 4 |

=== UEFA-non organised seasonal competitions ===
==== Inter-Cities Fairs Cup ====
| Season | Round | Opposition | Home | Away | Aggregate | Replay |
|---|---|---|---|---|---|---|
| 1962–63 | First round | (West Germany) Viktoria Köln | 4–1 | 3–4 | 7–5 | |
| 1962–63 | Second round | (Italy) Sampdoria | 6–0 | 0–1 | 6–1 | |
| 1962–63 | Quarter-finals | (Romania) Petrolul Ploiești | 2–0 | 0–1 | 2–1 | |
| 1962–63 | Semi-finals | (Socialist Federal Republic of Yugoslavia) Dinamo Zagreb | 0–1 | 1–2 | 1–3 | |
| 1964–65 | First round | (Czechoslovakia) Spartak Brno | 2–0 | 0–1 | 2–1 | |
| 1964–65 | Second round | (Austria) Wiener SC | 2–1 | 0–1 | 2–2 ^{2} | 2–0 |
| 1964–65 | Third round | (Italy) Roma | 1–0 | 2–1 | 3–1 | |
| 1964–65 | Quarter-finals | (Spain) Athletic Bilbao | 1–0 | 1–2 | 2–2 ^{3} | 3–0 |
| 1964–65 | Semi-finals | (England) Manchester United | 1–0 | 2–3 | 3–3 ^{4} | 2–1 |
| 1964–65 | Final | (Italy) Juventus | –– | 1–0 | 1–0 | |
| 1966–67 | First round | (Socialist Federal Republic of Yugoslavia) Olimpija Ljubljana | 3–0 | 3–3 | 6–3 | |
| 1966–67 | Second round | (Sweden) Örgryte IS | 7–1 | 0–0 | 7–1 | |
| 1966–67 | Third round | (West Germany) Eintracht Frankfurt | 2–1 | 1–4 | 3–5 | |
| 1967–68 | First round | (Romania) Argeș Pitești | 4–0 | 1–3 | 5–3 | |
| 1967–68 | Second round | (Spain) Zaragoza | 3–0 | 1–2 | 4–2 | |
| 1967–68 | Third round | (England) Liverpool | 1–0 | 1–0 | 2–0 | |
| 1967–68 | Quarter-finals | (Spain) Athletic Bilbao | 2–1 | 2–1 | 4–2 | |
| 1967–68 | Semi-finals | (Italy) Bologna | 3–2 | 2–2 | 5–4 | |
| 1967–68 | Finals | (England) Leeds United | 0–0 | 0–1 | 0–1 | |
| 1970–71 | First round | (England) Liverpool | 1–1 | 0–1 | 1–2 | |

==== Challenge Cup ====
| Season | Competition | Round | Club | Home | Away | Aggregate |
|---|---|---|---|---|---|---|
| 1901–02 | Challenge Cup | Regional 1. Round | (Hungary) Budapesti SC | –– | 3–1 | –– |
| 1901–02 | Challenge Cup | Regional Semi-finals | (Hungary) Budapesti TC | –– | 1–5 | –– |
| 1902–03 | Challenge Cup | Regional Final | (Hungary) 33 FC | 1–0 | –– | –– |
| 1902–03 | Challenge Cup | Semi-finals | (Austrian Empire) Wiener SC | –– | 1–5 | –– |
| 1909 | Challenge Cup | Group Stage | (German Empire) VfB Leipzig | 4–1 | –– | First Place |
| 1909 | Challenge Cup | Group Stage | (Hungary) Budapesti TC | 1–1 | –– | First Place |
| 1909 | Challenge Cup | Group Stage | (Hungary) MTK Budapest | –– | 2–1 | First Place |
| 1909 | Challenge Cup | Final | (Austrian Empire) Wiener SC | –– | 2–1 | Winner |
| 1910–11 | Challenge Cup | Regional 1. Round | (Hungary) Budapesti AK | 4–2 | –– | –– |
| 1910–11 | Challenge Cup | Regional 2. Round | (Hungary) 33 FC | 2–0 | –– | –– |
| 1910–11 | Challenge Cup | Regional Final | (Hungary) Nemzeti SC | 3–1 | –– | –– |
| 1910–11 | Challenge Cup | Final | (Austrian Empire) Wiener SC | –– | 0–3 | Loss |

==== Mitropa Cup ====
| Season | Competition | Round | Club | Home | Away | Aggregate |
|---|---|---|---|---|---|---|
| 1928 | Mitropa Cup | Quarter-finals | (Kingdom of Yugoslavia) Beogradski SK | 6–1 | 7–0 | 13–1 |
| 1928 | Mitropa Cup | Semi-finals | (Austria) SK Admira | 1–0 | 2–1 | 3–1 |
| 1928 | Mitropa Cup | Finals | (Austria) Rapid Wien | 7–1 | 3–5 | 10–6 |
| 1930 | Mitropa Cup | Quarter-finals | (Czechoslovakia) Slavia Prague | 1–0 | 2–2 | 3–2 |
| 1930 | Mitropa Cup | Semi-finals | (Austria) Rapid Wien | 1–0 | 1–5 | 2–5 |
| 1932 | Mitropa Cup | Quarter-finals | (Kingdom of Italy) Juventus | 3–3 | 0–4 | 3–7 |
| 1934 | Mitropa Cup | 1. Round | (Austria) Floridsdorfer AC | 8–0 | 2–1 | 10–1 |
| 1934 | Mitropa Cup | Quarter-finals | (Czechoslovakia) SK Kladno | 6–0 | 1–4 | 7–4 |
| 1934 | Mitropa Cup | Semi-finals | (Kingdom of Italy) Bologna | 1–1 | 1–5 | 2–6 |
| 1935 | Mitropa Cup | 1. Round | (Kingdom of Italy) Roma | 8–0 | 1–3 | 9–3 |
| 1935 | Mitropa Cup | Quarter-finals | (Czechoslovakia) SK Židenice | 6–1 | 2–4 | 8–5 |
| 1935 | Mitropa Cup | Semi-finals | Austria Wien | 4–2 | 2–3 | 6–5 |
| 1935 | Mitropa Cup | Finals | (Czechoslovakia) Sparta Praha | 2–1 | 0–3 | 2–4 |
| 1936 | Mitropa Cup | 1. Round | (Czechoslovakia) Slavia Prague | 5–2 | 0–4 | 5–6 |
| 1937 | Mitropa Cup | 1. Round | (Czechoslovakia) Slavia Prague | 3–1 | 2–2 | 5–3 |
| 1937 | Mitropa Cup | Quarter-finals | (Austria) First Vienna | 2–1 | 0–1 | 2–2 ^{1} |
| 1937 | Mitropa Cup | Semi-finals | Austria Wien | 6–1 | 1–4 | 7–5 |
| 1937 | Mitropa Cup | Finals | (Kingdom of Italy) Lazio | 4–2 | 5–4 | 9–6 |
| 1938 | Mitropa Cup | 1. Round | (Czechoslovakia) SK Židenice | 3–0 | 1–3 | 4–3 |
| 1938 | Mitropa Cup | Quarter-finals | (Romania) Ripensia Timișoara | 5–4 | 4–1 | 9–5 |
| 1938 | Mitropa Cup | Semi-finals | (Kingdom of Italy) Juventus | 2–0 | 2–3 | 4–3 |
| 1938 | Mitropa Cup | Finals | (Czechoslovakia) Slavia Prague | 0–2 | 2–2 | 2–4 |
| 1939 | Mitropa Cup | Quarter-finals | (Czechoslovakia) Sparta Prague | 2–3 | 2–0 | 4–3 |
| 1939 | Mitropa Cup | Semi-finals | (Kingdom of Italy) Bologna | 4–1 | 1–3 | 5–4 |
| 1939 | Mitropa Cup | Finals | (Kingdom of Hungary) Újpest | 2–2 | 1–4 | 3–6 |
| 1940 | Mitropa Cup | Quarter-finals | (Kingdom of Yugoslavia) Slavija Sarajevo | 11–1 | 0–3 | 11–4 |
| 1940 | Mitropa Cup | Semi-finals | (Kingdom of Yugoslavia) Beogradski SK | 2–0 | 0–1 | 2–1 |
| 1940 | Mitropa Cup | Finals | (Romania) Rapid București | x–x | x–x | w/d |
| 1958 | Danube Cup | Round of 16 | (Socialist Federal Republic of Yugoslavia) Radnički Beograd | 3–3 | 1–2 | 4–5 |
| 1960 | Mitropa Cup | Group Stage | (Austria) 1. Simmeringer SC | 1–2 | 5–1 | 6–3 |
| 1962 | Mitropa Cup | Group 1 | (Czechoslovakia) Spartak Hradec Králové | 0–1 | 1–2 | Fourth Place |
| 1962 | Mitropa Cup | Group 1 | (Socialist Federal Republic of Yugoslavia) Dinamo Zagreb | 1–5 | 0–2 | Fourth Place |
| 1962 | Mitropa Cup | Group 1 | (Italy) Juventus | 1–1 | 0–1 | Fourth Place |
| 1975–76 | Mitropa Cup | Group A | (Czechoslovakia) Zbrojovka Brno | 7–1 | 2–3 | Third Place |
| 1975–76 | Mitropa Cup | Group A | (Austria) Wacker Innsbruck | 0–2 | 0–1 | Third Place |
| 1988–89 | Mitropa Cup | Semi-finals | (Italy) Bologna | 3–3 | 2–5 | 5–8 |

Notes

- Note 1:(playoff 2–1)
- Note 2:(playoff 2–0)
- Note 3:(playoff 3–0)
- Note 4:(playoff 2–1)

== Club record in UEFA competitions ==
As correct of 18 September 2020

- Biggest home win: 8 September 1965, Ferencváros 9–1 (Iceland) Keflavík
- Biggest home defeat: 27 September 1995, Ferencváros 1–5 (Netherlands) Ajax and 13 August 2019, Ferencváros 0–4 (Croatia) Dinamo Zagreb
- Biggest away win: 29 July 1998, (Andorra) Principat 1–8 Ferencváros
- Biggest away defeat: 20 October 1994, (Portugal) Porto 6–0 Ferencváros
- Appearances in UEFA Champions League: 14
- Appearances in UEFA Cup Winners' Cup: 8
- Appearances in UEFA Europa League: 21
- Appearances in Inter-Cities Fairs Cup: 5
- Appearances in UEFA Intertoto Cup: 2
- Appearances in Mitropa Cup: 15
- Appearances in Challenge Cup: 4
- Player with most UEFA appearances: 54 (Hungary) Dénes Dibusz
- Top scorers in UEFA club competitions: 17 (Hungary) Péter Lipcsei

== Overall record ==
=== Competitions record ===
As of 8 December 2020

| Competition | Pld | W | D | L | GF | GA | GD | Win% |
|---|---|---|---|---|---|---|---|---|
| European Cup / Champions League | 55 | 19 | 16 | 20 | 82 | 100 | −18 | 34.55 |
| Cup Winners' Cup | 35 | 16 | 6 | 13 | 67 | 49 | +18 | 45.71 |
| UEFA Cup / UEFA Europa League | 86 | 34 | 22 | 30 | 129 | 111 | +18 | 39.53 |
| UEFA Intertoto Cup | 12 | 3 | 2 | 7 | 13 | 18 | −5 | 25.00 |
| Inter-Cities Fairs Cup | 42 | 23 | 5 | 14 | 1 | 1 | +0 | 54.76 |
| Mitropa Cup | 1 | 0 | 1 | 0 | 1 | 1 | +0 | 0.00 |
| Total | 231 | 95 | 52 | 84 | 293 | 280 | +13 | 41.13 |

Source: UEFA.com
Pld = Matches played; W = Matches won; D = Matches drawn; L = Matches lost; GF = Goals for; GA = Goals against; GD = Goal Difference.

- Correct as of 8 December 2020

| Country | Pld | W | D | L | GF | GA | GD | Win% |
| Totals | 295 | 125 | 52 | 118 | 556 | 514 | +42 | 42.37 |

=== By country and club ===
As of match played on 13 July 2021
Key

Positive balance (more wins than losses)
Neutral balance (as many wins as losses)
Negative balance (more losses than wins)

| Country | Club | P | W | D | L | GF | GA | GD | W% |
|---|---|---|---|---|---|---|---|---|---|
| Andorra | Principat | 2 | 2 | 0 | 0 | 14 | 1 | +13 | 100.00 |
| Subtotal | | 2 | 2 | 0 | 0 | 14 | 1 | +13 | 100.00 |
| Albania | Partizani | 2 | 0 | 2 | 0 | 2 | 2 | +0 | 0.00 |
| Albania | Tirana | 2 | 1 | 0 | 1 | 3 | 3 | +0 | 50.00 |
| Subtotal | | 4 | 1 | 2 | 1 | 5 | 5 | +0 | 25.00 |
| Armenia | Ulisses | 2 | 2 | 0 | 0 | 5 | 0 | +5 | 100.00 |
| Subtotal | | 2 | 2 | 0 | 0 | 5 | 0 | +5 | 100.00 |
| Austria | 1. Simmeringer SC | 2 | 1 | 0 | 1 | 6 | 3 | +3 | 50.00 |
| Austria | Admira Wacker Mödling | 4 | 2 | 0 | 2 | 3 | 3 | +0 | 50.00 |
| Austria | Austria Klagenfurt | 2 | 0 | 1 | 1 | 2 | 3 | −1 | 0.00 |
| Austria | Austria Wien | 4 | 2 | 0 | 2 | 13 | 10 | +3 | 50.00 |
| Austria | First Vienna | 3 | 2 | 0 | 1 | 4 | 3 | +1 | 66.67 |
| Austria | Floridsdorfer AC | 2 | 2 | 0 | 0 | 10 | 1 | +9 | 100.00 |
| Austria | Rapid Wien | 4 | 2 | 0 | 2 | 12 | 11 | +1 | 50.00 |
| Austria | Sturm Graz | 2 | 1 | 0 | 1 | 5 | 2 | +3 | 50.00 |
| Austria | Wacker Innsbruck | 4 | 0 | 0 | 4 | 1 | 8 | −7 | 0.00 |
| Austria | Wiener SC | 6 | 3 | 0 | 3 | 7 | 11 | −4 | 50.00 |
| Subtotal | | 33 | 14 | 1 | 18 | 62 | 57 | +5 | 42.42 |
| Belarus | MTZ-RIPO Minsk | 2 | 1 | 0 | 1 | 2 | 3 | −1 | 50.00 |
| Subtotal | | 2 | 1 | 0 | 1 | 2 | 3 | −1 | 50.00 |
| Belgium | Anderlecht | 2 | 1 | 1 | 0 | 2 | 1 | +1 | 50.00 |
| Belgium | Antwerp | 2 | 1 | 1 | 0 | 3 | 1 | +2 | 50.00 |
| Subtotal | | 4 | 2 | 2 | 0 | 5 | 2 | +3 | 50.00 |
| Bosnia and Herzegovina | Slavija Sarajevo (Note: Representing Yugoslavia) | 2 | 1 | 0 | 1 | 11 | 4 | +7 | 50.00 |
| Bosnia and Herzegovina | Željezničar (Note: Including ties representing Yugoslavia) | 4 | 1 | 0 | 3 | 3 | 6 | −3 | 25.00 |
| Subtotal | | 6 | 2 | 0 | 4 | 14 | 10 | +4 | 33.33 |
| Bulgaria | CSKA Sofia | 2 | 1 | 0 | 1 | 5 | 3 | +2 | 50.00 |
| Bulgaria | Levski Sofia | 2 | 2 | 0 | 0 | 7 | 3 | +4 | 100.00 |
| Bulgaria | Lokomotiv Sofia | 2 | 1 | 0 | 1 | 2 | 3 | −1 | 50.00 |
| Bulgaria | Ludogorets Razgrad | 4 | 2 | 1 | 1 | 6 | 7 | −1 | 50.00 |
| Bulgaria | Marek Dupnitsa | 2 | 1 | 0 | 1 | 2 | 3 | −1 | 50.00 |
| Subtotal | | 14 | 7 | 2 | 5 | 23 | 23 | +0 | 50.00 |
| Croatia | Dinamo Zagreb (Note: Including ties representing Yugoslavia) | 7 | 1 | 1 | 5 | 5 | 16 | −11 | 14.29 |
| Croatia | Hajduk Split | 2 | 0 | 2 | 0 | 0 | 0 | +0 | 0.00 |
| Croatia | Rijeka | 2 | 0 | 0 | 2 | 1 | 3 | −2 | 0.00 |
| Subtotal | | 11 | 1 | 3 | 7 | 6 | 19 | −13 | 9.09 |
| Czech Republic | Baník Ostrava (Note: Representing Czechoslovakia) | 2 | 1 | 0 | 1 | 3 | 5 | −2 | 50.00 |
| Czech Republic | Kladno (Note: Representing Czechoslovakia) | 2 | 1 | 0 | 1 | 7 | 4 | +3 | 50.00 |
| Czech Republic | Slavia Prague (Note: Representing Czechoslovakia) | 10 | 3 | 3 | 4 | 15 | 18 | −3 | 30.00 |
| Czech Republic | Sparta Prague (Note: Including ties representing Czechoslovakia) | 8 | 4 | 0 | 4 | 10 | 13 | −3 | 50.00 |
| Czech Republic | Spartak Hradec Králové (Note: Representing Czechoslovakia) | 2 | 0 | 0 | 2 | 1 | 3 | −2 | 0.00 |
| Czech Republic | Teplice | 2 | 0 | 1 | 1 | 2 | 4 | −2 | 0.00 |
| Czech Republic | Zbrojovka Brno (Note: Representing Czechoslovakia) | 8 | 4 | 0 | 4 | 23 | 13 | +10 | 50.00 |
| Subtotal | | 34 | 13 | 4 | 17 | 61 | 60 | +1 | 38.24 |
| Cyprus | AEL Limassol | 2 | 1 | 0 | 1 | 5 | 2 | +3 | 50.00 |
| Subtotal | | 2 | 1 | 0 | 1 | 5 | 2 | +3 | 50.00 |
| Denmark | Brøndby | 2 | 0 | 0 | 2 | 0 | 4 | −4 | 0.00 |
| Denmark | Copenhagen | 2 | 0 | 2 | 0 | 2 | 2 | +0 | 0.00 |
| Denmark | Midtjylland | 2 | 0 | 0 | 2 | 3 | 7 | −4 | 0.00 |
| Subtotal | | 6 | 0 | 2 | 4 | 5 | 13 | −8 | 0.00 |
| England | Leeds United | 4 | 0 | 1 | 3 | 0 | 7 | −7 | 0.00 |
| England | Liverpool | 6 | 2 | 3 | 1 | 4 | 3 | +1 | 33.33 |
| England | Manchester United | 3 | 2 | 0 | 1 | 5 | 4 | +1 | 66.67 |
| England | Millwall | 2 | 1 | 1 | 0 | 4 | 2 | +2 | 50.00 |
| England | Newcastle United | 2 | 1 | 0 | 1 | 3 | 6 | −3 | 50.00 |
| England | Wolverhampton Wanderers | 2 | 0 | 1 | 1 | 3 | 4 | −1 | 0.00 |
| Subtotal | | 19 | 6 | 6 | 7 | 19 | 26 | −7 | 31.58 |
| Finland | Haka | 2 | 1 | 1 | 0 | 6 | 2 | +4 | 50.00 |
| Subtotal | | 2 | 1 | 1 | 0 | 6 | 2 | +4 | 50.00 |
| Germany | 1. FC Magdeburg (Note: Representing East Germany) | 2 | 1 | 0 | 1 | 2 | 2 | +0 | 50.00 |
| Germany | Bayer Leverkusen | 1 | 0 | 0 | 1 | 0 | 2 | −2 | 0.00 |
| Germany | Dynamo Dresden (Note: Representing East Germany) | 2 | 1 | 0 | 1 | 1 | 4 | −3 | 50.00 |
| Germany | Eintracht Braunschweig (Note: Representing West Germany) | 2 | 1 | 1 | 0 | 6 | 3 | +3 | 50.00 |
| Germany | Eintracht Frankfurt (Note: Representing West Germany) | 2 | 1 | 0 | 1 | 3 | 5 | −2 | 50.00 |
| Germany | Schalke 04 | 1 | 0 | 0 | 1 | 0 | 2 | −2 | 0.00 |
| Germany | VfB Leipzig (Note: Representing German Empire) | 1 | 1 | 0 | 0 | 4 | 1 | +3 | 100.00 |
| Germany | VfB Stuttgart | 2 | 0 | 1 | 1 | 0 | 2 | −2 | 0.00 |
| Germany | Viktoria Köln (Note: Representing West Germany) | 2 | 1 | 0 | 1 | 7 | 5 | +2 | 50.00 |
| Germany | Werder Bremen | 2 | 0 | 0 | 2 | 2 | 4 | −2 | 0.00 |
| Subtotal | | 17 | 6 | 2 | 9 | 25 | 29 | −4 | 35.29 |
| Greece | AEK Athens | 2 | 1 | 0 | 1 | 4 | 6 | −2 | 50.00 |
| Greece | Panathinaikos | 2 | 1 | 1 | 0 | 3 | 1 | +2 | 50.00 |
| Greece | OFI | 2 | 1 | 0 | 1 | 2 | 4 | −2 | 50.00 |
| Greece | Olympiacos | 2 | 1 | 1 | 0 | 5 | 3 | +2 | 50.00 |
| Subtotal | | 8 | 4 | 2 | 2 | 14 | 14 | +0 | 50.00 |
| Hungary | 33 FC | 2 | 2 | 0 | 0 | 3 | 0 | +3 | 100.00 |
| Hungary | Budapesti AK | 1 | 1 | 0 | 0 | 4 | 2 | +2 | 100.00 |
| Hungary | Budapesti SC | 1 | 1 | 0 | 0 | 3 | 1 | +2 | 100.00 |
| Hungary | Budapesti TC | 2 | 0 | 1 | 1 | 2 | 6 | −4 | 0.00 |
| Hungary | MTK Budapest | 1 | 1 | 0 | 0 | 2 | 1 | +1 | 100.00 |
| Hungary | Nemzeti | 1 | 1 | 0 | 0 | 3 | 1 | +2 | 100.00 |
| Hungary | Újpest | 2 | 0 | 1 | 1 | 3 | 6 | −3 | 0.00 |
| Subtotal | | 10 | 6 | 2 | 2 | 20 | 16 | +4 | 60.00 |
| Iceland | Keflavík | 2 | 2 | 0 | 0 | 13 | 2 | +11 | 100.00 |
| Subtotal | | 2 | 2 | 0 | 0 | 13 | 2 | +11 | 100.00 |
| (Republic of Ireland) Ireland | Bohemian | 2 | 2 | 0 | 0 | 6 | 0 | +6 | 100.00 |
| Subtotal | | 2 | 2 | 0 | 0 | 6 | 0 | +6 | 100.00 |
| Israel | Maccabi Tel Aviv | 2 | 0 | 1 | 1 | 1 | 2 | −1 | 0.00 |
| Subtotal | | 2 | 0 | 1 | 1 | 1 | 2 | −1 | 0.00 |
| Italy | Bologna | 8 | 2 | 3 | 3 | 17 | 22 | −5 | 25.00 |
| Italy | Juventus | 9 | 2 | 2 | 5 | 11 | 18 | −7 | 22.22 |
| Italy | Internazionale | 2 | 0 | 1 | 1 | 1 | 5 | −4 | 0.00 |
| Italy | Lazio | 2 | 2 | 0 | 0 | 9 | 6 | +3 | 100.00 |
| Italy | Roma | 4 | 3 | 0 | 1 | 12 | 4 | +8 | 75.00 |
| Italy | Sampdoria | 2 | 1 | 0 | 1 | 6 | 1 | +5 | 50.00 |
| Subtotal | | 27 | 10 | 6 | 11 | 56 | 56 | +0 | 37.04 |
| Kosovo | Prishtina | 2 | 2 | 0 | 0 | 6 | 1 | +5 | 100.00 |
| Subtotal | | 2 | 2 | 0 | 0 | 6 | 1 | +5 | 100.00 |
| Latvia | Jelgava | 2 | 2 | 0 | 0 | 3 | 0 | +3 | 100.00 |
| Subtotal | | 2 | 2 | 0 | 0 | 3 | 0 | +3 | 100.00 |
| Lithuania | Sūduva | 2 | 1 | 1 | 0 | 4 | 2 | +2 | 50.00 |
| Lithuania | Žalgiris | 0 | 0 | 0 | 0 | 0 | 0 | +0 | — |
| Subtotal | | 2 | 1 | 1 | 0 | 4 | 2 | +2 | 50.00 |
| (Luxembourg) Luxemburg | F91 Dudelange | 2 | 2 | 0 | 0 | 12 | 2 | +10 | 100.00 |
| (Luxembourg) Luxemburg | Jeunesse Esch | 2 | 2 | 0 | 0 | 11 | 3 | +8 | 100.00 |
| Subtotal | | 4 | 4 | 0 | 0 | 23 | 5 | +18 | 100.00 |
| Malta | Birkirkara | 2 | 2 | 0 | 0 | 6 | 0 | +6 | 100.00 |
| Malta | Floriana | 2 | 1 | 0 | 1 | 6 | 1 | +5 | 50.00 |
| Malta | Sliema Wanderers | 2 | 1 | 1 | 0 | 3 | 2 | +1 | 50.00 |
| Malta | Valletta | 2 | 1 | 1 | 0 | 4 | 2 | +2 | 50.00 |
| Subtotal | | 4 | 1 | 2 | 1 | 19 | 5 | +14 | 25.00 |
| Moldova | Constructorul Chișinău | 2 | 1 | 1 | 0 | 4 | 2 | +2 | 50.00 |
| Subtotal | | 2 | 1 | 1 | 0 | 4 | 2 | +2 | 50.00 |
| Netherlands | Ajax | 2 | 0 | 0 | 2 | 1 | 9 | −8 | 0.00 |
| Netherlands | Go Ahead Eagles | 2 | 1 | 1 | 0 | 5 | 2 | +3 | 50.00 |
| Netherlands | Feyenoord | 1 | 0 | 1 | 0 | 1 | 1 | +0 | 0.00 |
| Netherlands | PSV Eindhoven | 2 | 0 | 0 | 2 | 2 | 6 | −4 | 0.00 |
| Subtotal | | 7 | 1 | 2 | 4 | 9 | 18 | −9 | 14.29 |
| Norway | Aalesunds | 2 | 1 | 0 | 1 | 3 | 4 | −1 | 50.00 |
| Norway | Molde | 2 | 0 | 2 | 0 | 3 | 3 | +0 | 0.00 |
| Subtotal | | 4 | 1 | 2 | 1 | 6 | 7 | −1 | 25.00 |
| Poland | Gwardia Warsaw | 2 | 0 | 0 | 2 | 1 | 3 | −2 | 0.00 |
| Subtotal | | 2 | 0 | 0 | 2 | 1 | 3 | −2 | 0.00 |
| Portugal | Porto | 2 | 1 | 0 | 1 | 2 | 6 | −4 | 50.00 |
| Subtotal | | 2 | 1 | 0 | 1 | 2 | 6 | −4 | 50.00 |
| Romania | Argeș Pitești | 2 | 1 | 0 | 1 | 5 | 3 | +2 | 50.00 |
| Romania | Petrolul Ploiești | 2 | 1 | 0 | 1 | 2 | 1 | +1 | 50.00 |
| Romania | Ripensia Timișoara | 2 | 2 | 0 | 0 | 9 | 5 | +4 | 100.00 |
| Subtotal | | 6 | 4 | 0 | 2 | 16 | 9 | +7 | 66.67 |
| Russia | CSKA Moscow | 4 | 2 | 1 | 1 | 4 | 3 | +1 | 50.00 |
| Subtotal | | 4 | 2 | 1 | 1 | 4 | 3 | +1 | 50.00 |
| Scotland | Celtic | 1 | 1 | 0 | 0 | 2 | 1 | +1 | 100.00 |
| Scotland | Heart of Midlothian | 1 | 1 | 0 | 0 | 1 | 0 | +1 | 100.00 |
| Scotland | Rangers | 2 | 1 | 0 | 1 | 4 | 5 | −1 | 50.00 |
| Subtotal | | 4 | 3 | 0 | 1 | 7 | 6 | +1 | 75.00 |
| Serbia | Beogradski SK (Note: Representing Kingdom of Yugoslavia) | 4 | 3 | 0 | 1 | 15 | 2 | +13 | 75.00 |
| Serbia | Radnički Beograd (Note: Representing Yugoslavia) | 2 | 0 | 1 | 1 | 4 | 5 | −1 | 0.00 |
| Serbia | Red Star Belgrade (Note: Representing Yugoslavia) | 2 | 1 | 1 | 0 | 4 | 3 | +1 | 50.00 |
| Subtotal | | 8 | 4 | 2 | 2 | 23 | 10 | +13 | 50.00 |
| Slovakia | Slovan Bratislava (Note: Representing Czechoslovakia) | 2 | 0 | 1 | 1 | 1 | 4 | −3 | 0.00 |
| Slovakia | Spartak Trnava (Note: Representing Czechoslovakia) | 2 | 1 | 1 | 0 | 4 | 2 | +2 | 50.00 |
| Subtotal | | 4 | 1 | 2 | 1 | 5 | 6 | −1 | 25.00 |
| Slovenia | Olimpija Ljubljana (Note: Representing Yugoslavia) | 2 | 1 | 1 | 0 | 6 | 3 | +3 | 50.00 |
| Subtotal | | 2 | 1 | 1 | 0 | 6 | 3 | +3 | 50.00 |
| Spain | Athletic Bilbao | 6 | 4 | 1 | 1 | 6 | 3 | +3 | 66.67 |
| Spain | Barcelona | 2 | 0 | 0 | 2 | 1 | 8 | −7 | 0.00 |
| Spain | Espanyol | 2 | 0 | 2 | 0 | 3 | 3 | +0 | 0.00 |
| Spain | Real Madrid | 2 | 0 | 1 | 1 | 2 | 7 | −5 | 0.00 |
| Spain | Zaragoza | 2 | 1 | 0 | 1 | 4 | 2 | +2 | 50.00 |
| Subtotal | | 14 | 5 | 4 | 5 | 16 | 23 | −7 | 35.71 |
| Sweden | Djurgårdens IF | 1 | 1 | 0 | 0 | 2 | 0 | +2 | 100.00 |
| Sweden | Helsingborgs IF | 2 | 1 | 0 | 1 | 1 | 1 | +0 | 50.00 |
| Sweden | IFK Göteborg | 2 | 0 | 1 | 1 | 1 | 4 | −3 | 0.00 |
| Sweden | Kalmar FF | 2 | 1 | 1 | 0 | 4 | 2 | +2 | 50.00 |
| Sweden | Malmö FF | 2 | 1 | 1 | 0 | 4 | 2 | +2 | 50.00 |
| Sweden | Örgryte IS | 2 | 1 | 1 | 0 | 7 | 1 | +6 | 50.00 |
| Subtotal | | 11 | 5 | 4 | 2 | 18 | 10 | +8 | 45.45 |
| Switzerland | Basel | 1 | 0 | 0 | 1 | 1 | 2 | −1 | 0.00 |
| Switzerland | Grasshopper | 2 | 1 | 1 | 0 | 6 | 3 | +3 | 50.00 |
| Switzerland | Luzern | 2 | 0 | 0 | 2 | 4 | 7 | −3 | 0.00 |
| Switzerland | Zürich | 4 | 1 | 1 | 2 | 4 | 3 | +1 | 25.00 |
| Subtotal | | 9 | 2 | 2 | 5 | 15 | 15 | +0 | 22.22 |
| Turkey | Fenerbahçe | 2 | 1 | 0 | 1 | 4 | 2 | +2 | 50.00 |
| Turkey | Galatasaray | 2 | 1 | 0 | 1 | 2 | 4 | −2 | 50.00 |
| Turkey | Kocaelispor | 2 | 2 | 0 | 0 | 5 | 0 | +5 | 100.00 |
| Subtotal | | 6 | 4 | 1 | 1 | 11 | 6 | +5 | 66.67 |
| Ukraine | Dynamo Kyiv (Note: Including ties representing Soviet Union) | 3 | 0 | 1 | 2 | 2 | 6 | −4 | 0.00 |
| Subtotal | | 3 | 0 | 1 | 2 | 2 | 6 | −4 | 0.00 |
| Wales | Cardiff City | 2 | 2 | 0 | 0 | 6 | 1 | +5 | 100.00 |
| Subtotal | | 2 | 2 | 0 | 0 | 6 | 1 | +5 | 100.00 |

== UEFA club ranking ==
Current ranking

As of 8 November 2024

| Rank | Team | Coeff. |
|---|---|---|
| 56 | (Scotland) Celtic | 33.000 |
| 57 | (Norway) Bodø/Glimt | 33.000 |
| 58 | (Hungary) Ferencváros | 33.000 |
| 59 | (Switzerland) Basel | 33.000 |
| 60 | (Turkey) Galatasaray | 32.500 |

All time ranking

1955–62 —
1958–63 72
1959–64 39
1960–65 26
1961–66 15
1962–67 8
1963–68 6
1964–69 11
1965–70 21

1966–71 38
1967–72 42
1968–73 52
1969–74 47
1970–75 32
1971–76 38
1972–77 39
1973–78 38
1974–79 18

1975–80 26
1976–81 24
1977–82 40
1978–83 42
1979–84 67
1980–85 94
1981–86 97
1982–87 151
1983–89 —

1985–90 192
1986–91 114
1987–92 69
1988–93 58
1989–94 60
1990–95 56
1991–96 50
1992–97 47
1993–98 34

1994–99 95
1995–00 112
1996–01 147
1997–02 202
1998–03 188
1999–04 151
2000–05 125
2001–06 135
2002–07 123

2003–08 154
2004–09 168
2005–11 —
2007–12 307
2008–13 324
2009–14 350
2010–15 334
2011–16 322
2012–17 304

2013–18 315
2014–19 288
2015–20 135
2016–21 113
2017–22 98
2018–23 62
2019–24 55

Last updated: 4 October 2024

Season 2024-25 in progress

Source: Club coefficients at. View chart definition.
