= Mariano Gomez =

Mariano Gomez or Mariano Gómez may refer to:

- Mariano Gomez (priest) (1799-1872), Filipino Catholic priest
- Mariano Gómez (footballer) (born 1999), Spanish footballer
