= 1965 Inter-Cities Fairs Cup final =

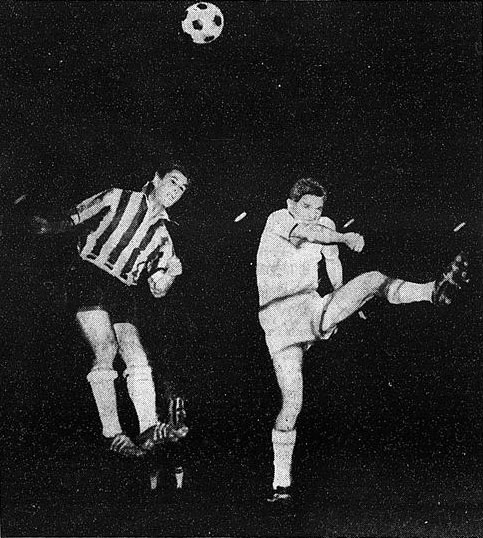
- A moment of the match
- Event: 1964–65 Inter-Cities Fairs Cup
Ferencváros	Juventus
(Hungary)	(Italy)
1	0
- Date: 23 June 1965
- Venue: Stadio Comunale, Turin
- Referee: Gottfried Dienst (Switzerland)
- Attendance: 40,000

The 1965 Inter-Cities Fairs Cup final was the final of the seventh Inter-Cities Fairs Cup and the second of two that were not played over two legs. It was played on 23 June 1965 between Ferencváros of Hungary and Juventus of Italy. Ferencváros won the tie 1–0. Juve, with a lower physical level than their Hungarian opponents as a result of the demanding season in Serie A, played the match without two of its best players, Sivori and Salvadore.

== Route to the final ==
Ferencváros					Round	Juventus				
Opponent	Agg.	1st leg	2nd leg	Replay (if necessary)		Opponent	Agg.	1st leg	2nd leg	Replay (if necessary)
(Czechoslovakia) Spartak Brno	2–1	2–0 (H)	0–1 (A)		First round	(Belgium) Union Saint-Gilloise	2–0	1–0 (A)	1–0 (H)	
(Austria) Wiener Sport-Club	2–2	0–1 (A)	2–1 (H)	2–0 (H)	Second round	(France) Stade Français	1–0	0–0 (A)	1–0 (H)	
(Italy) Roma	3–1	2–1 (A)	1–0 (H)		Third round	(Bulgaria) Lokomotiv Plovdiv	2–2	1–1 (H)	1–1 (A)	2–1 (a.e.t.) (H)
(Spain) Athletic Club	2–2	1–0 (H)	1–2 (A)	3–0 (H)	Quarter-finals	Bye				
(England) Manchester United	3–3	2–3 (A)	1–0 (H)	2–1 (H)	Semi-finals	(Spain) Atlético Madrid	4–4	1–3 (A)	3–1 (H)	3–1 (H)

== Match details ==
June 23, 1965

Ferencváros (Hungary)	1–0	(Italy) Juventus
Fenyvesi 74'

Stadio Comunale, Turin
Attendance: 40,000
Referee: Gottfried Dienst (Switzerland)

Ferencváros
Juventus

GK	1	(Hungary) István Géczi
DF	2	(Hungary) Dezső Novák
DF	3	(Hungary) Sándor Mátrai (c)
DF	4	(Hungary) László Horváth
MF	5	(Hungary) István Juhász
MF	6	(Hungary) Pál Orosz
FW	7	(Hungary) János Karába
FW	8	(Hungary) Zoltán Varga
FW	9	(Hungary) Flórián Albert
FW	10	(Hungary) Gyula Rákosi
FW	11	(Hungary) Máté Fenyvesi
Manager:
(Hungary) József Mészáros

GK	1	(Italy) Roberto Anzolin
DF	2	(Italy) Adolfo Gori
DF	5	(Italy) Ernesto Castano (c)
DF	3	(Italy) Benito Sarti
MF	4	(Italy) Giancarlo Bercellino
MF	6	(Italy) Gianfranco Leoncini
FW	7	(Italy) Gino Stacchini
FW	8	(Spain) Luis del Sol
FW	9	(France) Néstor Combin
FW	10	(Italy) Bruno Mazzia
FW	11	(Italy) Giampaolo Menichelli
Manager:
(Paraguay) Heriberto Herrera

== See also ==
- 1964–65 Inter-Cities Fairs Cup
- Ferencvárosi TC in European football
- Juventus F.C. in European football
