= Olivér Nagy =

Olivér Nagy may refer to:

- Olivér Nagy (footballer, born 1989)
- Olivér Nagy (footballer, born 2003)
