= Philippe Rommens =

Belgian footballer (born 1997)

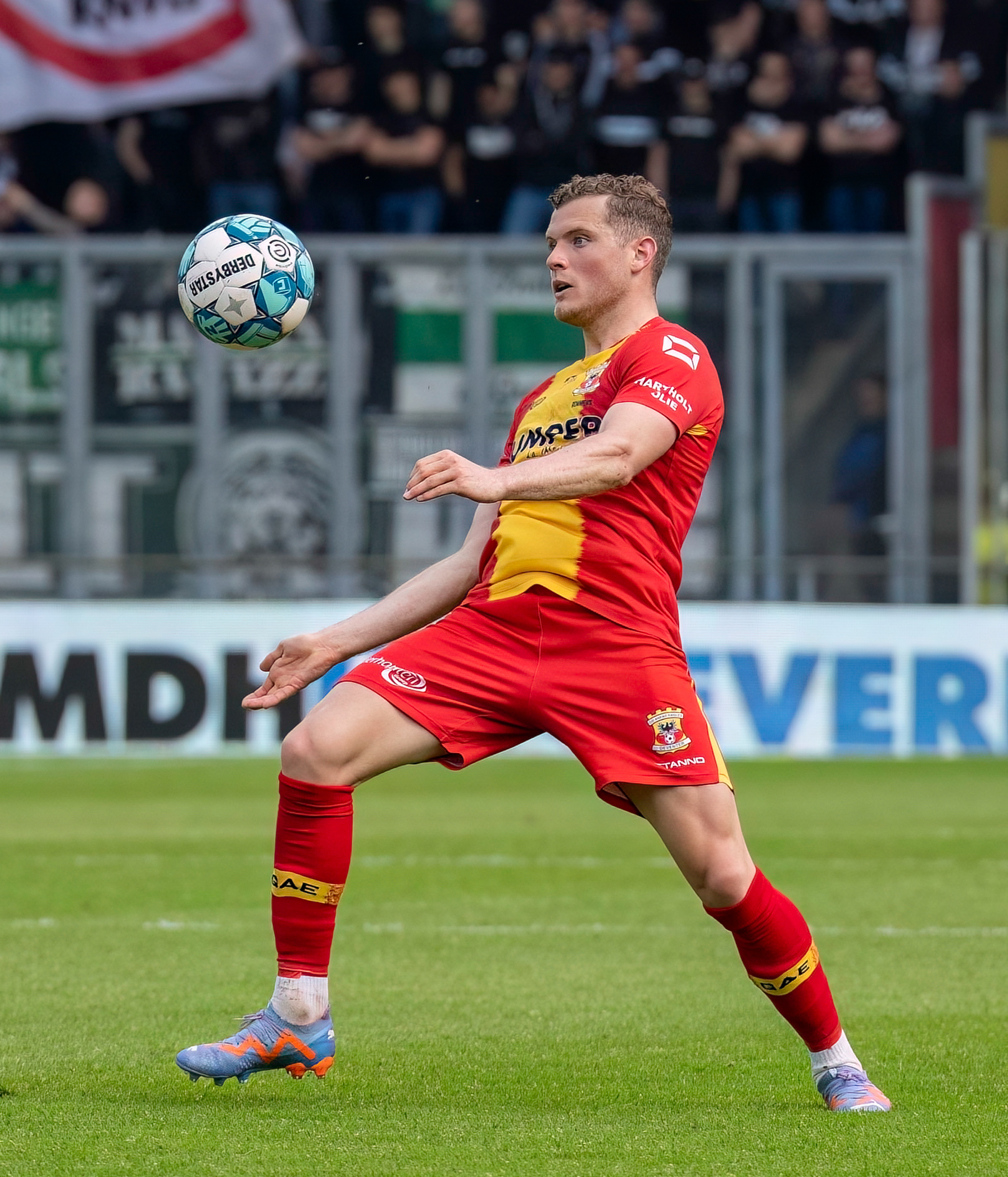
- Rommens with Go Ahead Eagles

Personal information
- Date of birth: 20 August 1997 (age 29)
- Place of birth: Wommelgem, Belgium
- Height: 1.75 m (5 ft 9 in)
- Position: Midfielder

Team information
- Current team: Ferencváros
- Number: 88

Youth career
- KFC Ranst
- 2002–2006: Lierse
- 2006–2014: PSV

Senior career*
| Years | Team | Apps | (Gls) |
| 2014–2018 | Jong PSV | 55 | (2) |
| 2018–2021 | TOP Oss | 81 | (16) |
| 2021–2024 | Go Ahead Eagles | 83 | (11) |
| 2024– | Ferencváros | 21 | (1) |

International career
| 2015 | Belgium U19 | 2 | (1) |
- * Club domestic league appearances and goals as of 30 May 2026

Philippe Rommens (born 20 August 1997) is a Belgian professional footballer who plays as a midfielder for Hungarian Nemzeti Bajnokság I club Ferencváros.

== Career ==
=== PSV ===
Rommens is a youth exponent from PSV Eindhoven, who he joined in 2006 together with his brother, Olivier. Before, they had both started out at local club KFC Ranst, and moved to Lierse SK, where they played for four years before starting at the youth academy of PSV.

Rommens made his professional debut for Jong PSV in the second-tier Eerste Divisie on 19 September 2014, replacing Andjelo Rudović in the 83rd minute of a 2–0 home defeat against Sparta Rotterdam. Rommens scored his first goal in professional football on 8 August 2016 in a home game against Den Bosch which ended in a 5–4 win. He played an official match against his brother Olivier for the first time on 9 September, where he with Jong PSV played in the Eerste Divisie against NAC Breda in a 1–1 draw.

=== TOP Oss ===
Rommens played for PSV for twelve years, including four seasons—mainly as a substitute—for Jong PSV. A debut in the first team was, however, not in the cards. The club let him leave for TOP Oss on a free transfer in August 2018. There, he almost immediately became a starter. TOP Oss reunited him with his brother Olivier in January 2019.

On 31 July, it was announced that Rommens had suffered an injury which required surgery. He was subsequently sidelined for three to four months. He returned to the pitch on 10 November in a 3–0 loss to Excelsior coming on as a substitute in the 56th minute for Kyvon Leidsman.

=== Go Ahead Eagles ===
On 22 May 2021, it was announced that Rommens had signed a two-year contract with Go Ahead Eagles, with an option for an additional season. This meant, that he would join the recently promoted Eredivisie club for the 2021–22 season. He made his debut on 13 August, opening day in the domestic league, in a 1–0 home loss to SC Heerenveen.

=== Ferencváros ===
On 11 July 2024, Hungarian NB1 club Ferencváros signed Rommens. The fee and contract length were undisclosed. On 9 May 2026, he won the 2025–26 Magyar Kupa season with Ferencváros by beating Zalaegerszegi TE 1–0 in the 2026 Magyar Kupa final at Puskás Aréna.

== Personal ==
His brother is football player Olivier Rommens, currently playing for Milsami Orhei.

== Career statistics ==
=== Club ===
As of match played 13 August 2024

Appearances and goals by club, season and competition
| Club | Season | League | | | National cup | | Europe | | Other | | Total | |
| Club | Season | Division | Apps | Goals | Apps | Goals | Apps | Goals | Apps | Goals | Apps | Goals |
|---|---|---|---|---|---|---|---|---|---|---|---|---|
| Jong PSV | 2014–15 | Eerste Divisie | 2 | 0 | — | | — | | — | | 2 | 0 |
| Jong PSV | 2015–16 | Eerste Divisie | 5 | 0 | — | | — | | — | | 5 | 0 |
| Jong PSV | 2016–17 | Eerste Divisie | 27 | 2 | — | | — | | — | | 27 | 2 |
| Jong PSV | 2017–18 | Eerste Divisie | 21 | 0 | — | | — | | — | | 21 | 0 |
| Jong PSV | Total | | 55 | 2 | — | | — | | — | | 55 | 2 |
| TOP Oss | 2018–19 | Eerste Divisie | 33 | 3 | 2 | 1 | — | | 2 (Note: Appearances in the Eredivisie promotion/relegation play-offs) | 0 | 37 | 4 |
| TOP Oss | 2019–20 | Eerste Divisie | 28 | 9 | 2 | 0 | — | | — | | 30 | 9 |
| TOP Oss | 2020–21 | Eerste Divisie | 20 | 4 | 0 | 0 | — | | — | | 20 | 4 |
| TOP Oss | Total | | 81 | 16 | 4 | 1 | — | | 2 | 0 | 87 | 17 |
| Go Ahead Eagles | 2021–22 | Eredivisie | 34 | 2 | 5 | 0 | — | | — | | 39 | 2 |
| Go Ahead Eagles | 2022–23 | Eredivisie | 28 | 3 | 2 | 1 | — | | — | | 30 | 4 |
| Go Ahead Eagles | 2023–24 | Eredivisie | 21 | 6 | 3 | 0 | — | | — | | 24 | 6 |
| Go Ahead Eagles | Total | | 83 | 11 | 10 | 1 | — | | — | | 93 | 12 |
| Ferencváros | 2024–25 | Nemzeti Bajnokság I | 2 | 0 | 0 | 0 | 4 (Note: Appearances in UEFA Champions League) | 1 | — | | 6 | 1 |
| Career total | | | 221 | 29 | 14 | 2 | 4 | 1 | 2 | 0 | 241 | 32 |

== Honours ==
Individual

- Eredivisie Team of the Month: November 2022
