= Franko Kovačević =

Croatian footballer (born 1999)

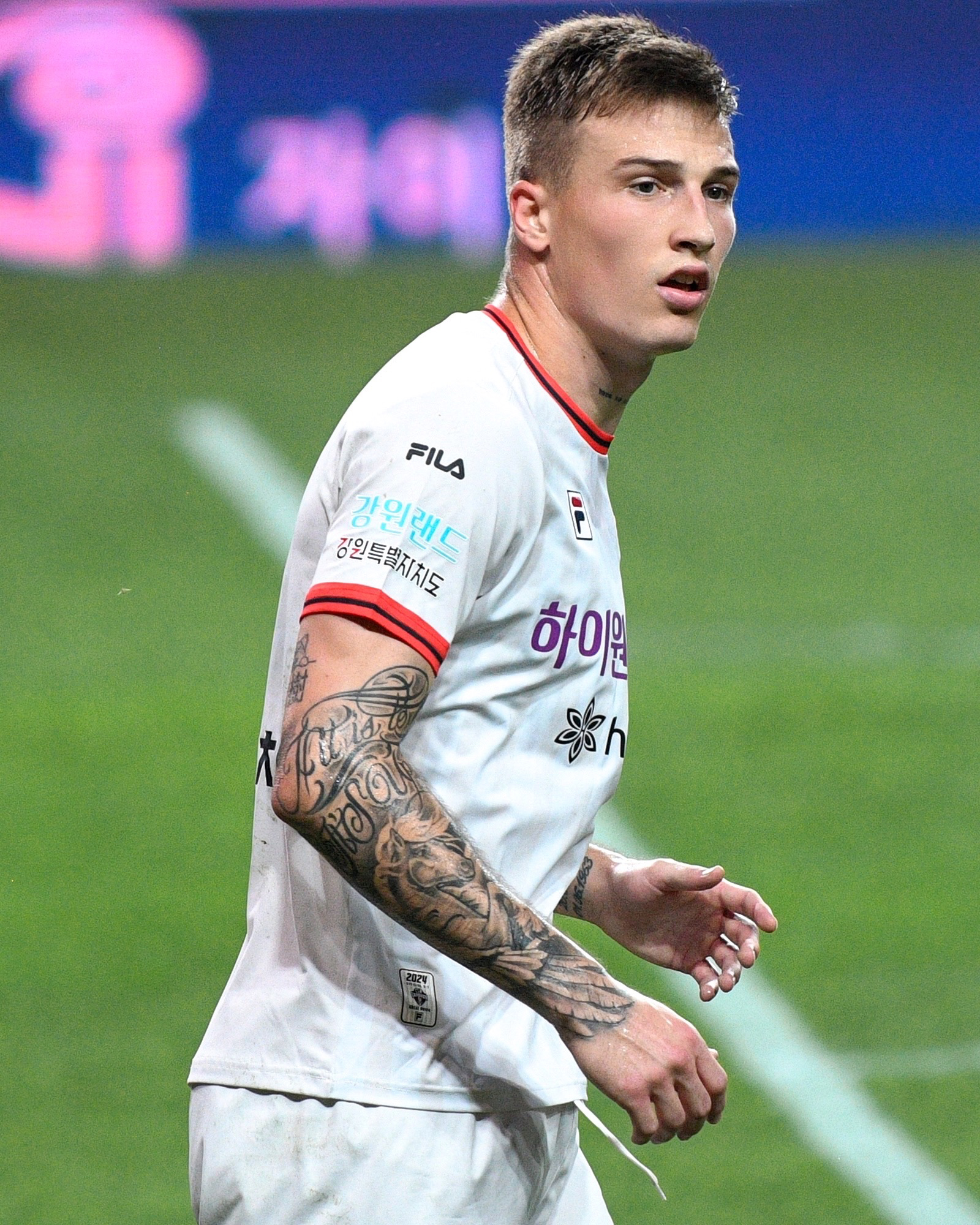
- Kovačević in 2024

Personal information
- Date of birth: 8 August 1999 (age 27)
- Place of birth: Koprivnica, Croatia
- Height: 1.85 m (6 ft 1 in)
- Positions: Winger; forward

Team information
- Current team: Ferencváros
- Number: 19

Youth career
- 2009–2010: Varaždin
- 2010–2015: Bjelovar
- 2015–2017: Rijeka

Senior career*
Years	Team	Apps	(Gls)
2017–2019	Hajduk Split	5	(0)
2017–2018	→ Hajduk Split II	14	(1)
2019	→ Rudeš (loan)	13	(0)
2019	Rudeš	0	(0)
2019–2022	1899 Hoffenheim II	12	(7)
2020–2021	→ FC Cincinnati (loan)	4	(0)
2021–2022	→ Pafos (loan)	25	(1)
2022–2023	Domžale	31	(12)
2023–2025	Wehen Wiesbaden	23	(4)
2024–2025	→ Gangwon (loan)	27	(5)
2025−2026	Celje	14	(11)
2026–	Ferencváros	12	(5)

International career
2015	Croatia U17	2	(0)
2017	Croatia U18	2	(0)
2019	Croatia U21	1	(0)
- * Club domestic league appearances and goals as of 30 May 2026

Franko Kovačević (born 8 August 1999) is a Croatian professional footballer who plays as a winger for Hungarian club Ferencváros.

== Club career ==
Born in Koprivnica, Kovačević grew up in the city of Križevci. At the age of 10, he joined the youth academy of Varaždin, before switching to Bjelovar a year later. According to him, he started taking football seriously and started "serious training" during his stint at Bjelovar. At the age of 15, he switched to the academy of Rijeka. After having spent one year at the club, he was called by German club Bayern Munich's manager Carlo Ancelotti to train with their team. In spite of the club expressing their interest in him, he joined Hajduk Split on 16 June 2018 and was promoted to the first team.

On 24 August 2017, Kovačević made his first team debut, coming on as an 85th-minute substitute for Hamza Barry in a 1–1 draw against English club Everton in the UEFA Europa League. On 3 March 2018, he made his league debut, coming as a substitute in a 1–0 victory over Rudeš.

On 15 February 2019, Kovačević was loaned out to Rudeš for the rest of the season. At the end of the season, Rudeš activated the option to sign him permanently for the transfer fee of €300,000. However, a week after activating the option, he was sold to German club TSG 1899 Hoffenheim where he was supposed to play for the U23 team in the Regionalliga Südwest. Kovačević signed a four-year contract with the German club.

=== FC Cincinnati (loan) ===
On 12 October 2020, it was announced that Kovačević would be loaned out to FC Cincinnati of Major League Soccer for the remainder of the 2020 season with an option to extend through 2021.

=== Pafos ===
On 5 August 2021, Kovačević signed with Cypriot side Pafos.

=== Domžale ===
On 12 August 2022, Kovačević joined Slovenian PrvaLiga side Domžale on a three-year contract.

=== Wehen Wiesbaden ===
On 3 August 2023, Kovačević returned to Germany and signed with Wehen Wiesbaden in 2. Bundesliga.

On 10 July 2024, Kovačević joined Gangwon in South Korea on loan.

=== Celje ===
On 14 June 2025, he signed a three-year contract with Celje in Slovenia.

=== Ferencváros ===
On 9 May 2026, he won the 2025–26 Magyar Kupa season with Ferencváros by beating Zalaegerszegi TE 1–0 in the 2026 Magyar Kupa final at Puskás Aréna.

== Career statistics ==
As of match played 18 December 2025

Appearances and goals by club, season and competition
Club	Season	League			National cup (Note: Includes Croatian Cup, Cypriot Cup, Slovenian Cup, DFB-Pokal)		Continental		Other		Total	
Club	Season	Division	Apps	Goals	Apps	Goals	Apps	Goals	Apps	Goals	Apps	Goals
Hajduk Split	2017–18	Prva HNL	4	0	2	0	1 (Note: Appearance(s) in UEFA Europa League)	0	—		7	0
Hajduk Split	2018–19	Prva HNL	1	0	2	0	0	0	—		3	0
Hajduk Split	Total		5	0	4	0	1	0	—		10	0
Hadjuk Split II	2017–18	Druga NL	8	0	—		—		—		8	0
Hadjuk Split II	2018–19	Druga NL	6	1	—		—		—		6	1
Hadjuk Split II	Total		14	1	—		—		—		14	1
Rudeš (loan)	2018–19	Prva HNL	13	0	—		—		—		13	0
Hoffenheim II	2019–20	Regionalliga	8	5	—		—		—		8	5
Hoffenheim II	2020–21	Regionalliga	3	1	—		—		—		3	1
Hoffenheim II	2022–23	Regionalliga	1	1	—		—		—		1	1
Hoffenheim II	Total		12	7	—		—		—		12	7
Cincinnati (loan)	2020	MLS	1	0	—		—		—		1	0
Cincinnati (loan)	2021	MLS	3	0	—		—		—		3	0
Cincinnati (loan)	Total		4	0	—		—		—		4	0
Pafos (loan)	2021–22	Cypriot First Division	25	1	2	0	—		—		27	1
Domžale	2022–23	1. SNL	30	12	2	1	—		—		32	13
Domžale	2023–24	1. SNL	1	0	—		2 (Note: Appearance(s) in UEFA Europa Conference League)	2	—		3	2
Domžale	Total		31	12	2	1	2	2	—		35	15
Wehen Wiesbaden	2023–24	2. Bundesliga	23	4	1	0	—		2 (Note: Appearance(s) in promotion/relegation play-off)	0	26	4
Gangwon (loan)	2024	K League 1	15	4	—		—		—		15	4
Gangwon (loan)	2025	K League 1	12	1	0	0	—		—		12	1
Gangwon (loan)	Total		27	5	0	0	—		—		27	5
Celje	2025–26	1. SNL	14	11	1	2	13 (Note: Four appearances and four goals in UEFA Europa League, nine appearances and eight goals in UEFA Conference League)	12	—		28	25
Career total			168	41	10	3	16	14	2	0	196	58
