= Nathan Zohoré =

French footballer

Personal information
- Full name: Guédé Nathan Zohoré
- Date of birth: 17 November 2000 (age 25)
- Place of birth: Créteil, France
- Height: 1.88 m (6 ft 2 in)
- Position: Centre-back

Team information
- Current team: Ferencváros

Youth career
- Évry
- 2018–2019: Sochaux

Senior career*
Years	Team	Apps	(Gls)
2019–2022	Sochaux II	39	(1)
2021	→ Louhans-Cuiseaux (loan)	0	(0)
2021	Sochaux	0	(0)
2022–2026	Boulogne	103	(4)
2026–	Ferencváros	0	(0)
- * Club domestic league appearances and goals as of 20 June 2026

Guédé Nathan Zohoré (born 17 November 2000) is a French professional footballer who plays as a centre-back for the Nemzeti Bajnokság I club Ferencváros.

== Club career ==
Zohoré is a product of the youth academies of the French clubs Évry and Sochaux. On 1 March 2019, he signed his first professional contract with Sochaux for 3 seasons, and was promoted to their reserves. On 29 January 2021, he joined Louhans-Cuiseaux on loan for the second half of the 2020–21 season in the Championnat National 2. On 27 November 2021, he made his debut with the senior Sochaux team in a 3–0 Coupe de France win over AS Montchat Lyon. In the summer of 2022, he transferred to Boulogne in the Championnat National 2. He helped Boulogne earn 2 consecutive promotions, and was named their captain ahead of the 2025–26 season in the Ligue 2.

== International career ==
Born in France, Zohoré is of Ivorian descent.
