= Dénes Dibusz =

Hungarian footballer (born 1990)

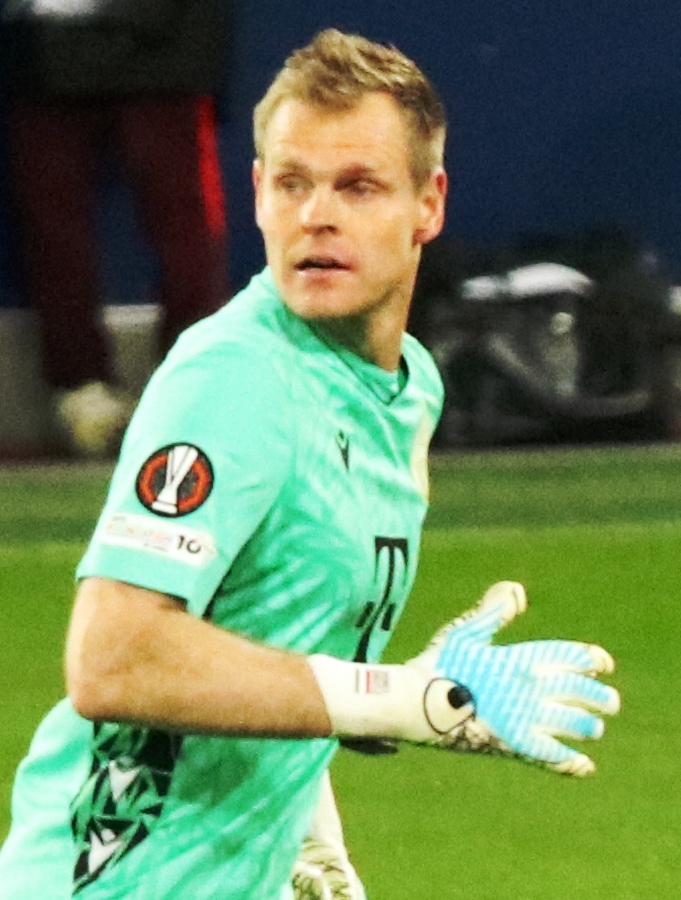
- Dibusz with Ferencváros in 2025

Personal information
- Full name: Dénes Dibusz
- Date of birth: 16 November 1990 (age 35)
- Place of birth: Pécs, Hungary
- Height: 1.88 m (6 ft 2 in)
- Position: Goalkeeper

Team information
- Current team: Ferencváros
- Number: 90

Youth career
- 2002–2008: Pécs

Senior career*
Years	Team	Apps	(Gls)
2008–2014	Pécs	99	(0)
2009–2010	→ Barcs (loan)	20	(0)
2014–	Ferencváros	351	(0)

International career^{‡}
2014–	Hungary	47	(0)
- * Club domestic league appearances and goals as of 30 May 2026 ‡ National team caps and goals as of 16 November 2025

Dénes Dibusz (born 16 November 1990) is a Hungarian professional footballer who plays as a goalkeeper for Nemzeti Bajnokság I club Ferencváros, which he captains, and the Hungary national team.

== Club career ==
=== Ferencváros ===
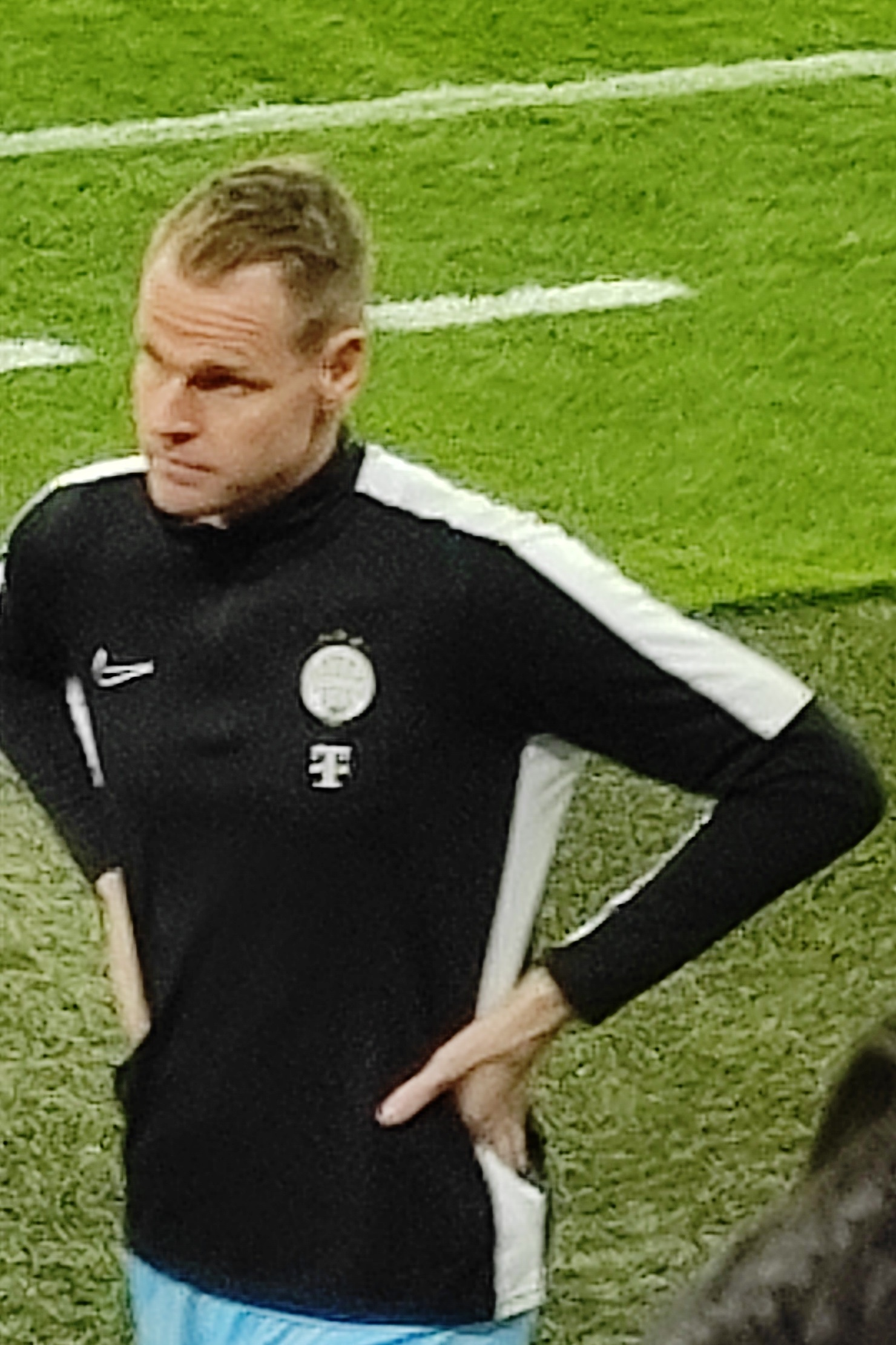
Dibusz in 2024 with Ferencváros

On 20 May 2015, Ferencváros beat Videoton 4–0 at the Groupama Arena in the 2014–15 Magyar Kupa Final.

On 16 June 2020, he became champion with Ferencváros by beating Honvéd at the Hidegkuti Nándor Stadion on the 30th match day of the 2019–20 Nemzeti Bajnokság I season.

On 29 September 2020, he was member of the Ferencváros team which qualified for the 2020–21 UEFA Champions League group stage after beating Molde on 3–3 aggregate (away goals) at the Groupama Aréna.

On 20 April 2021, he won the 2020–21 Nemzeti Bajnokság I season with Ferencváros by beating archrival Újpest 3–0 at the Groupama Arena. The goals were scored by Myrto Uzuni (3rd and 77th minute) and Tokmac Nguen (30th minute).

On 5 May 2023, he won the 2022–23 Nemzeti Bajnokság I with Ferencváros, after Kecskemét lost 1–0 to Honvéd at the Bozsik Aréna on the 30th matchday.

On 20 April 2024, the Ferencváros–Kisvárda tie ended with a goalless draw at the Groupama Aréna on the 29th match day of the 2023–24 Nemzeti Bajnokság I season which meant that Ferencváros won their 35th championship.

On 15 May 2024, Ferencváros were defeated by Paks 2–0 in the 2024 Magyar Kupa Final at the Puskás Aréna.

Dibusz won the 2024–25 Nemzeti Bajnokság I season with Ferencváros after beating Győr 2–1 at the ETO Park on the last match day on 24 May 2025. On 9 May 2026, he won the 2025–26 Magyar Kupa season with Ferencváros by beating Zalaegerszegi TE 1–0 in the 2026 Magyar Kupa final at Puskás Aréna.

== International career ==
Dibusz made his first appearance for the Hungary national football team in a UEFA Euro 2016 qualifier against the Faroe Islands, keeping a clean sheet in the 1–0 win.

Dibusz was selected for Hungary's UEFA Euro 2016 squad, serving as third-choice goalkeeper behind Gábor Király and Péter Gulácsi.

On 1 June 2021, Dibusz was included in the final 26-man squad to represent Hungary at the rescheduled UEFA Euro 2020 tournament, again serving as back-up, this time to Gulácsi who had inherited the number 1 jersey from the retired Király.

Gulácsi's cruciate ligament injury in October 2022 saw Dibusz take his place in the Hungarian goal for the UEFA Euro 2024 qualifying campaign, with the Magyars going unbeaten throughout 2023. He played eight matches during the Euro 2024 qualifiers, conceding seven goals and keeping three clean sheets.

On 14 May 2024, Dibusz was named in Hungary's squad for UEFA Euro 2024. However, he was an unused substitute in all three Group A matches as Gulácsi regained his place as starting goalkeeper. In an interview with Nemzeti Sport, he said that he had come home disappointed from the Euro 2024.

== Club statistics ==
=== Club ===
As of match played 9 November 2025

Appearances and goals by club, season and competition
Club	Season	League			Cup		League Cup		Europe		Total	
Club	Season	Division	Apps	Goals	Apps	Goals	Apps	Goals	Apps	Goals	Apps	Goals
Pécs	2008–09	Nemzeti Bajnokság II	1	0	0	0	0	0	0	0	1	0
Pécs	2010–11	Nemzeti Bajnokság II	29	0	2	0	0	0	0	0	31	0
Pécs	2011–12	Nemzeti Bajnokság I	30	0	2	0	0	0	0	0	32	0
Pécs	2012–13	Nemzeti Bajnokság I	29	0	0	0	3	0	0	0	32	0
Pécs	2013–14	Nemzeti Bajnokság I	10	0	0	0	4	0	0	0	14	0
Pécs	Total		99	0	4	0	7	0	0	0	110	0
Barcs (loan)	2009–10	Nemzeti Bajnokság II	20	0	1	0	0	0	0	0	21	0
Ferencváros	2013–14	Nemzeti Bajnokság I	13	0	0	0	3	0	0	0	16	0
Ferencváros	2014–15	Nemzeti Bajnokság I	30	0	4	0	1	0	4	0	39	0
Ferencváros	2015–16	Nemzeti Bajnokság I	31	0	5	0	0	0	4	0	40	0
Ferencváros	2016–17	Nemzeti Bajnokság I	28	0	5	0	0	0	2	0	35	0
Ferencváros	2017–18	Nemzeti Bajnokság I	32	0	1	0	0	0	4	0	37	0
Ferencváros	2018–19	Nemzeti Bajnokság I	32	0	4	0	0	0	2	0	38	0
Ferencváros	2019–20	Nemzeti Bajnokság I	26	0	0	0	–		14	0	40	0
Ferencváros	2020–21	Nemzeti Bajnokság I	28	0	1	0	–		11	0	40	0
Ferencváros	2021–22	Nemzeti Bajnokság I	26	0	3	0	–		13	0	42	0
Ferencváros	2022–23	Nemzeti Bajnokság I	29	0	0	0	–		15	0	44	0
Ferencváros	2023–24	Nemzeti Bajnokság I	29	0	0	0	–		15	0	44	0
Ferencváros	2024–25	Nemzeti Bajnokság I	27	0	3	0	–		12	0	42	0
Ferencváros	2025–26	Nemzeti Bajnokság I	9	0	0	0	–		6	0	15	0
Ferencváros	Total		340	0	26	0	4	0	102	0	472	0
Career total			459	0	31	0	11	0	102	0	603	0

=== International ===
As of match played 16 November 2025

Appearances and goals by national team and year
National team	Year	Apps	Goals
Hungary	2014	2	0
Hungary	2015	1	0
Hungary	2016	1	0
Hungary	2017	1	0
Hungary	2018	2	0
Hungary	2019	2	0
Hungary	2020	3	0
Hungary	2021	7	0
Hungary	2022	5	0
Hungary	2023	9	0
Hungary	2024	7	0
Hungary	2025	6	0
Total		47	0

== Honours ==
Ferencváros

- Nemzeti Bajnokság I: 2015–16, 2018–19, 2019–20, 2020–21, 2021–22, 2022–23, 2023–24, 2024–25
- Magyar Kupa: 2014–15, 2015–16, 2016–17, 2021–22
- Ligakupa: 2014–15
- Szuperkupa: 2015

Pécs

- Nemzeti Bajnokság II: 2010–11

Individual

- Nemzeti Bajnokság I Save of the Month: September 2023
