= Olivér Nagy (footballer, born 2003) =

Hungarian footballer

Personal information
- Full name: Olivér Zoltán Nagy
- Date of birth: 12 March 2003 (age 23)
- Place of birth: Budapest, Hungary
- Position: Defender

Team information
- Current team: Ferencváros
- Number: 54

Youth career
- 2009–2013: Kőbányai ISE
- 2013–2020: Ferencváros

Senior career*
Years	Team	Apps	(Gls)
2020–	Ferencváros	1	(0)
2021–2023	Ferencvárosi TC II	14	(0)
2021–2023	→ Soroksár (loan)	51	(1)
2023–2024	→ Kecskemét (loan)	13	(1)
2024–2026	→ Soroksár (loan)	43	(2)
- * Club domestic league appearances and goals as of 26 July 2026

Olivér Nagy (born 12 March 2003) is a Hungarian football player who plays as a defender for Nemzeti Bajnokság I club Ferencváros.

He began his youth career with KISE and Ferencváros in Budapest. As a senior, he initially played for Ferencváros II in Nemzeti Bajnokság III, before spending several seasons with Soroksár in Nemzeti Bajnokság II. In July 2023, he joined Nemzeti Bajnokság I side Kecskemét on a one-year loan. During his spell at the club, he also made his international debut in the UEFA Conference League qualifying rounds, playing against Latvian side Riga FC.

From 2026, he became a member of Ferencváros' first-team squad, making further international appearances in the UEFA Europa League and also playing in the top flight of the Hungarian league.
