= Mariano Gómez (footballer) =

Argentine-Hungaian footballer (born 1999)

Personal information
- Date of birth: 5 February 1999 (age 27)
- Place of birth: Esperanza, Argentina
- Height: 1.94 m (6 ft 4 in)
- Position: Centre-back

Team information
- Current team: Ferencvárosi TC
- Number: 4

Youth career
- Unión Santa Fe

Senior career*
Years	Team	Apps	(Gls)
2017–2020	Unión Santa Fe	2	(0)
2019–2020	→ Ibiza (loan)	23	(1)
2020–2024	Atlético Madrid B	38	(1)
2021	→ Racing Ferrol (loan)	4	(0)
2021–2022	→ Algeciras (loan)	34	(3)
2022–2023	→ Badajoz (loan)	35	(0)
2024–2026	Zürich	52	(1)
2026–	Ferencvárosi TC	14	(3)
- * Club domestic league appearances and goals as of 30 May 2026

Mariano Gómez (born 5 February 1999) is an Argentine-Hungarian professional footballer who plays as a centre-back for Ferencvárosi TC.

== Club career ==
Gómez started his career with Unión Santa Fe. He was first an unused substitute for an Argentine Primera División match with Lanús on 13 October 2017, prior to making his professional debut under manager Leonardo Madelón on 25 November against Patronato. Gómez made one further appearance, versus Arsenal de Sarandí, during the 2017–18 season as Unión qualified for the 2019 Copa Sudamericana. In January 2019, Gómez moved to Spanish football on loan with Ibiza of Segunda División B. His bow came on 14 April in a win over Cartagena. In total, he appeared twenty-three times and scored once; versus Peña Deportiva.

On 5 September 2020, Gómez was purchased by fellow Segunda División B team Atlético Madrid B; he signed a five-year contract. His first appearance arrived on 18 October in a win over newly promoted Poblense. Six games later, on 29 January 2021, he headed to fellow Segunda División B side Racing de Ferrol on loan until the end of 2020–21.

On 24 August 2021, Gómez was loaned to Primera División RFEF side Algeciras CF, on loan for one year.

On 5 June 2024, Gómez signed a three-year contract with Zürich in Switzerland.

=== Ferencváros ===
He joined Hungarian side Ferencvárosi TC in January 2026. On 9 May 2026, he won the 2025–26 Magyar Kupa season with Ferencváros by beating Zalaegerszegi TE 1–0 in the 2026 Magyar Kupa final at Puskás Aréna.

== International career ==
In February 2018, Gómez was selected to train with the Argentina U19s. He also had experience with the U20s.

== Personal life ==
On 3 May 2026, he obtained Hungarian citizenship. He played his first match as a Hungarian citizen in the Ferencvárosi TC–Újpest FC rivalry match on 3 May 2026.

== Career statistics ==
As of 9 October 2022.

Club statistics
Club	Season	League			Cup		Continental		Other		Total	
Club	Season	Division	Apps	Goals	Apps	Goals	Apps	Goals	Apps	Goals	Apps	Goals
Unión Santa Fe	2017–18	Primera División	2	0	0	0	—		0	0	2	0
Unión Santa Fe	Total		2	0	0	0	0	0	0	0	2	0
Ibiza (loan)	2018–19	Segunda División B	5	0	0	0	—		0	0	5	0
Ibiza (loan)	2019–20	Segunda División B	18	1	3	0	—		0	0	21	1
Ibiza (loan)	Total		23	1	0	0	0	0	0	0	26	1
Atlético Madrid B	2020–21	Segunda División B	7	0	—		—		0	0	7	0
Racing Ferrol (loan)	2020–21	Segunda División B	4	0	0	0	—		0	0	4	0
Algeciras (loan)	2021–22	Primera División RFEF	34	3	0	0	—		0	0	34	3
Badajoz (loan)	2022–23	Primera División RFEF	7	0	0	0	—		0	0	7	0
Career total			77	4	0	0	0	0	0	0	80	4
