= 2024–25 Ferencvárosi TC season =

Ferencváros
2024–25 season
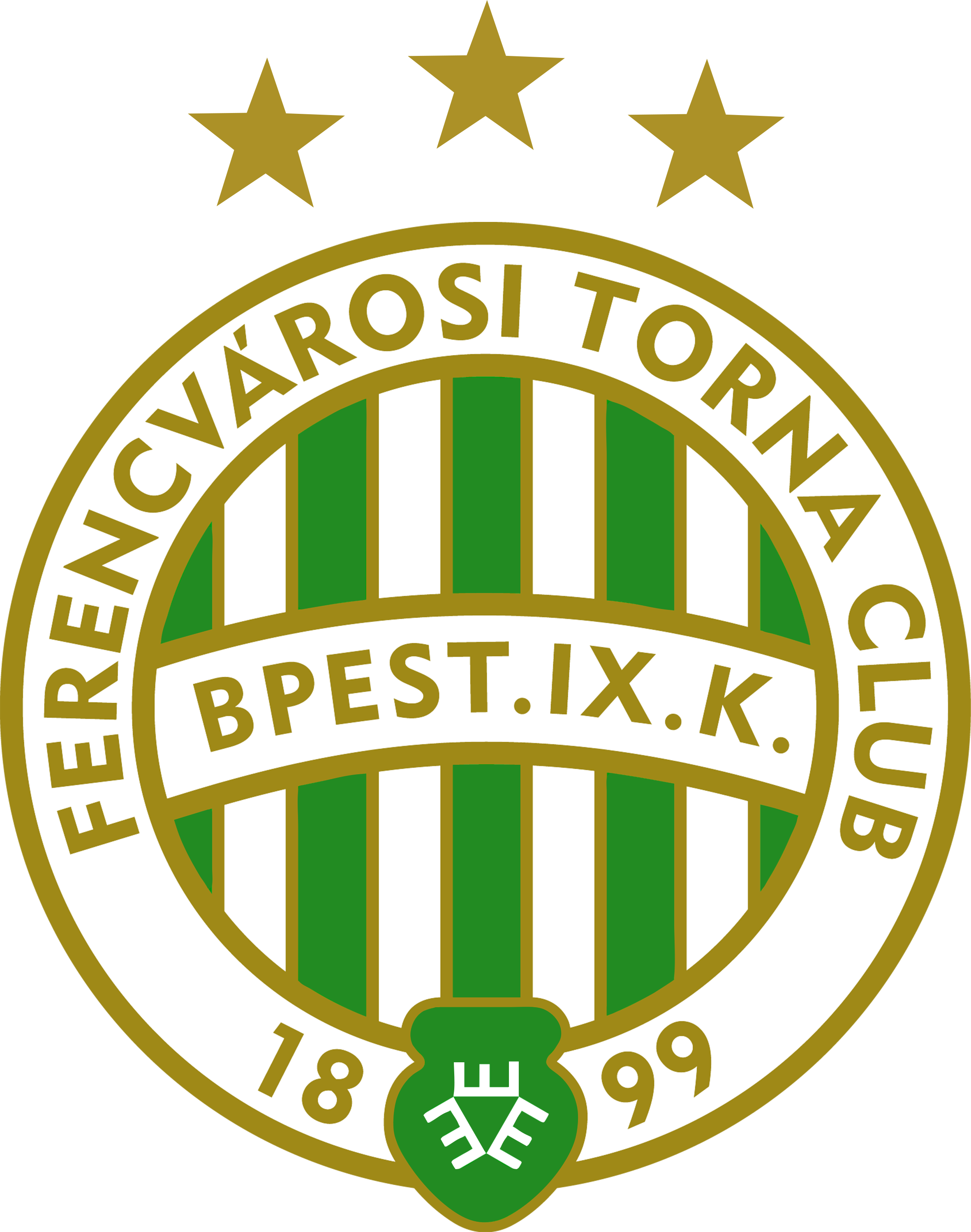
- Chairman: Gábor Kubatov
- Manager: Robbie Keane (from 6 January 2025)
- Stadium: Groupama Arena
- Nemzeti Bajnokság I: 1st (36th title)
- Magyar Kupa: Runners-up
- Champions League: Third qualifying round
- Europa League: Knockout phase play-offs
- Top goalscorer: League: Barnabás Varga (12); All: Barnabás Varga (21)
- Highest home attendance: 20,795 v Tottenham H., 3 October 2024, EL, League Phase, Matchday 2
- Lowest home attendance: 6,695 v MTK, 2 Feb. 2025, Nemzeti Bajnokság I, Round 18
- Average home league attendance: 11,236
- Biggest win: 7–0 v Nyíregyháza, 20 April 2025, Nemzeti Bajnokság I, Round 28
- Biggest defeat: 0–5 v PAOK, 12 December 2024, Europa League, League phase, Matchday 6
- All statistics correct as of 24 May 2025.

The 2024–25 season is Ferencvárosi Torna Club's 121st competitive season and 16th consecutive season in the Nemzeti Bajnokság I, where they will be competing as six-time defending champions and 126th year in existence as a football club. In addition to the domestic league, Ferencváros participated in this season's editions of the Magyar Kupa, UEFA Champions League and UEFA Europa League.

On 14 May, in the final of the MOL Hungarian Cup, Ferencváros – just like last year – lost to Paks and became the silver medalist. Paks led for half time, but Ferencváros saved the match for extra time. Several goals had already been scored, so a penalty shootout was decided, during which Paks goalkeeper Péter Szappanos saved twice, then Paks striker Bálint Vécsei closed the duel against his former team as the last kicker.

== Kits ==
Supplier: Macron • Sponsor: Magyar Telekom / Tippmix / Superz. • Shirt back sponsor: HSA Group • Sleeve sponsor: Groupama / MVM • Short sponsor: Volkswagen / MVM / Tippmix / Magyar Telekom

Home	Away	Third

Goalkeeper^{1}	Goalkeeper^{2}	Goalkeeper^{3}	Goalkeeper^{4}

== First team squad ==
As of 20 April 2025

Note: Flags indicate national team as defined under FIFA eligibility rules; some limited exceptions apply. Players may hold more than one non-FIFA nationality.

No.	Pos.	Nation	Player
1	GK	HUN	Ádám Varga
3	DF	DEN	Stefan Gartenmann
5	MF	GUI	Naby Keïta (on loan from (German Football Association) Werder Bremen)
7	MF	TUN	Mohamed Ali Ben Romdhane
8	FW	SRB	Aleksandar Pešić
11	FW	BRA	Matheus Saldanha
15	MF	ISR	Mohammad Abu Fani
16	MF	NOR	Kristoffer Zachariassen
17	DF	BIH	Eldar Ćivić
19	FW	HUN	Barnabás Varga (vice-captain)
20	FW	MLI	Adama Traoré
22	DF	HUN	Gábor Szalai
24	FW	NGR	Tosin Kehinde
25	MF	LAT	Cebrail Makreckis
27	DF	FRA	Ibrahim Cissé
29	GK	HUN	Gergő Szécsi
32	FW	SRB	Aleksandar Ćirković

No.	Pos.	Nation	Player
34	DF	BRA	Raul Gustavo
44	DF	FRA	Ismaïl Aaneba
54	DF	HUN	Norbert Kaján
63	GK	HUN	Dániel Radnóti
64	MF	HUN	Alex Tóth
66	MF	BRA	Júlio Romão
70	MF	GHA	Isaac Pappoe
72	MF	HUN	Ádám Madarász
75	FW	FRA	Lenny Joseph
80	MF	CIV	Habib Maïga
88	MF	BEL	Philippe Rommens
89	GK	HUN	Dávid Gróf
90	GK	HUN	Dénes Dibusz (captain)
93	FW	SUR	Virgil Misidjan
99	DF	ECU	Cristian Ramírez
—	FW	BRA	Guilherme Henrique
—	FW	SEN	Olelekan Ibrahim

== Transfers ==
=== Summer ===
In: Note: Flags indicate national team as defined under FIFA eligibility rules; some limited exceptions apply. Players may hold more than one non-FIFA nationality.

No.	Pos.	Nation	Player
40	FW	NGR	Fortune Bassey (loan return from (Israel Football Association) Hapoel Petah Tikva)
30	FW	HUN	Zsolt Gruber (loan return from (Hungarian Football Federation) Zalaegerszeg)
4	DF	NED	Mats Knoester (loan return from (Danish Football Association) Aarhus)
—	DF	HUN	Patrick Iyinbor (loan return from (Hungarian Football Federation) Kecskemét)
—	MF	HUN	Olivér Nagy (loan return from (Hungarian Football Federation) Kecskemét)
70	MF	GHA	Isaac Pappoe (from (Swiss Football Association) Aarau)
34	DF	BRA	Raul Gustavo (from (Brazilian Football Confederation) Corinthians)
10	MF	BRA	Kady (from (Russian Football Union) Krasnodar)
88	MF	BEL	Philippe Rommens (from (Royal Dutch Football Association) Go Ahead Eagles)
3	DF	DEN	Stefan Gartenmann (from (Danish Football Association) Midtjylland)
93	FW	SUR	Virgil Misidjan (from (Saudi Arabian Football Federation) Al-Tai)
22	DF	HUN	Gábor Szalai (from (Swiss Football Association) Lausanne-Sport)
11	MF	BRA	Matheus Saldanha (from (Football Association of Serbia) Partizan)

Out: Note: Flags indicate national team as defined under FIFA eligibility rules; some limited exceptions apply. Players may hold more than one non-FIFA nationality.

No.	Pos.	Nation	Player
3	DF	MAR	Samy Mmaee (to (Croatian Football Federation) Dinamo Zagreb)
5	MF	BIH	Muhamed Bešić (Without club)
31	DF	USA	Henry Wingo (to (Canadian Soccer Association) Toronto)
76	FW	HUN	Krisztián Lisztes (to (German Football Association) Eintracht Frankfurt)
—	FW	HUN	Damir Redzic (to (Slovak Football Association) DAC)
—	DF	HUN	Patrick Iyinbor (End of contract)
10	FW	BRA	Marquinhos (to (Russian Football Union) Spartak Moscow)
22	DF	SUR	Myenty Abena (to (Russian Football Union) Spartak Moscow)
14	MF	BIH	Amer Gojak (to (Croatian Football Federation) Rijeka)
33	MF	BIH	Stjepan Lončar (to (Polish Football Association) Lech Poznań)
40	FW	NGR	Fortune Bassey (on loan to (Slovak Football Association) DAC)

=== Winter ===
In: Note: Flags indicate national team as defined under FIFA eligibility rules; some limited exceptions apply. Players may hold more than one non-FIFA nationality.

No.	Pos.	Nation	Player
5	MF	GUI	Naby Keïta (on loan from (German Football Association) Werder Bremen)
75	FW	FRA	Lenny Joseph (from (French Football Federation) Grenoble)
32	FW	SRB	Aleksandar Ćirković (from (Football Association of Serbia) TSC)
89	GK	HUN	Dávid Gróf (from (Hellenic Football Federation) Levadiakos)
66	MF	BRA	Júlio Romão (from (Association of Football Federations of Azerbaijan) Qarabağ)
—	FW	BRA	Guilherme Henrique (from (Brazilian Football Confederation) Corinthians U20)
—	FW	SEN	Olelekan Ibrahim

Out: Note: Flags indicate national team as defined under FIFA eligibility rules; some limited exceptions apply. Players may hold more than one non-FIFA nationality.

No.	Pos.	Nation	Player
21	DF	HUN	Endre Botka (out loan to (Hungarian Football Federation) Kecskemét)
42	MF	NGR	Anderson Esiti (to (Hungarian Football Federation) Zalaegerszeg)
18	FW	GHA	Owusu Kwabena (out loan to (Hungarian Football Federation) Zalaegerszeg)
4	DF	NED	Mats Knoester (mutual agreement)
18	FW	GHA	Owusu Kwabena (out loan to (Turkish Football Federation) Ankaragücü)
10	MF	BRA	Kady Borges (to (Association of Football Federations of Azerbaijan) Qarabağ)
23	DF	HUN	Lóránd Pászka (out loan to (Hungarian Football Federation) Kecskemét)
30	FW	HUN	Zsombor Gruber (out loan to (Hungarian Football Federation) MTK)

=== Out on loan ===
Note: Flags indicate national team as defined under FIFA eligibility rules; some limited exceptions apply. Players may hold more than one non-FIFA nationality.

No.	Pos.	Nation	Player
68	FW	HUN	Ádám Halmai (loan to (Hungarian Football Federation) Soroksár)
61	GK	HUN	Szabolcs Mergl (loan to (Hungarian Football Federation) Soroksár)
—	MF	HUN	Olivér Nagy (loan to (Hungarian Football Federation) Soroksár)
—	MF	HUN	Péter Baráth (loan to (Polish Football Association) Raków Częstochowa)
—	FW	HUN	Zétény Varga (loan to (Hungarian Football Federation) Diósgyőr)
11	FW	BIH	Kenan Kodro (loan to (Turkish Football Federation) Gaziantep)
55	MF	HUN	Bálint Katona (loan to (Hungarian Football Federation) Kecskemét)
77	MF	ARM	Edgar Sevikyan (loan to (Russian Football Union) Lokomotiv Moscow)
40	FW	NGR	Fortune Bassey (loan to (Slovak Football Association) DAC)
42	MF	NGR	Anderson Esiti (loan to (Hungarian Football Federation) Zalaegerszeg to 30 June 2025)
21	DF	HUN	Endre Botka (loan to (Hungarian Football Federation) Kecskemét to 30 June 2025)
18	FW	GHA	Owusu Kwabena (~~loan to (Hungarian Football Federation) Zalaegerszeg to 30 June 2025~~)
18	FW	GHA	Owusu Kwabena (loan to (Turkish Football Federation) Ankaragücü to 30 June 2025)
23	DF	HUN	Lóránd Pászka (loan to (Hungarian Football Federation) Kecskemét to 30 June 2025)
30	FW	HUN	Zsombor Gruber (out loan to (Hungarian Football Federation) MTK to 30 June 2025)

=== Contract extension ===
Note: Flags indicate national team as defined under FIFA eligibility rules; some limited exceptions apply. Players may hold more than one non-FIFA nationality.

No.	Pos.	Nation	Player
54	DF	HUN	Norbert Kaján

=== Managerial changes ===
Outgoing manager	Manner of departure	Date of vacancy	Position in table	Incoming manager	Date of appointment
(Serbia) Dejan Stanković	Signed by Spartak Moscow	16 May 2024	Pre-season	(Netherlands) Pascal Jansen	13 June 2024
(Netherlands) Pascal Jansen	Signed by New York City FC	31 December 2024	2nd	(Republic of Ireland) Robbie Keane	6 January 2025

== Friendlies ==
Win Draw Loss Fixtures

=== Pre-season ===
22 June 2024 Friendly	Nafta Lendava (Slovenian II) (Football Association of Slovenia)	0–1	Ferencváros	Austria
17:00 CEST		Report	Gojak 61'	Attendance: 0 Referee: Róbert Nagy; Assistant referees: Ákos Berényi, Péter Márkus
Note: Ferencváros 1st half: Á. Varga — Kaján, Knoester, Cissé, Ramírez — Zachariassen (Pappoe (substituted on) 34'), Abu Fani, Lončar — Owusu, Bassey, Marquinhos • Ferencváros 2nd half: G. Szécsi — Pászka, A. Tóth, Aaneba, Ćivić — Kehinde (Pappoe (substituted on) 82'), B. Katona (Gruber (substituted on) 68'), Gojak, Sevikyan (Z. Varga (substituted on) 68') — Kodro, Pešić

27 June 2024 Friendly	Sepsi OSK (Romanian I) (Romanian Football Federation)	4–4	Ferencváros	Austria
17:30 CEST	Matei 17', 64'; Kallaku 39'; Coman 48'	Report	Raul Gustavo (yellow card) 60'; Lončar 71'; Bassey 96'; Kehinde 100', 121'	Attendance: 0
Note: Ferencváros 1st half: G. Szécsi — Makreckis, Cissé, Raul Gustavo, Ćivić (Z. Varga (substituted on) 36') — Abu Fani, Gojak — Owusu, Sevikyan, Pászka — Pešić • Ferencváros 2nd half: Radnóti — Kaján, Aaneba, Knoester, Ramírez — Lončar, Pappoe — Bassey, Gruber, Kehinde — Kodro

6 July 2024 Friendly	CSKA 1948 Sofia (Bulgarian I) (Bulgarian Football Union)	1–1	Ferencváros	Lienz, Austria
17:00 CEST	Pedrinho 33'	Report	Pászka 49'	Attendance: 0
Note: Ferencváros 1st half: Dibusz — Makreckis, Abena, Raul Gustavo, Ramírez — Pappoe, Abu Fani – Sevikyan, Kehinde, Gruber — Kodro • Ferencváros 2nd half: Radnóti — Kaján, Aaneba, Knoester, Pászka — Lončar, Esiti, A. Tóth, Ben Romdhane (Gojak (substituted on) 75') — Pešić, Bassey

10 July 2024 Friendly	NK Istra 1961 (Croatian I) (Croatian Football Federation)	1–3	Ferencváros	Lienz, Austria
17:00 CEST; 4x30 min	Ivanisevic 80'	Report	Pešić 49', 60'; Bassey 91'	Attendance: 0
Note: Ferencváros (1–90 min): Dibusz — Botka (Aaneba (substituted on) 45'), Knoester, Cissé, Ramírez — Lončar, Esiti (Owusu (substituted on) 72'), A. Tóth — Ben Romdhane (Traoré (substituted on) 72'), Pešić, Kehinde • Ferencváros (91–120 min): Á. Varga — Makreckis, Abena, Raul Gustavo, Ćivić — Maïga, B. Katona — Traoré, Bassey, Sevikyan — Kodro

15 July 2024 Friendly	West Ham United (English I) (The Football Association)	2–2	Ferencváros	Kitzbühel, Austria
16:00 CEST	Ings 49'; Aguerd 90'	Report	Owusu 25'; Pešić 41'; Maïga (yellow card) 47'	Stadium: Sportstadion Langau; Attendance: 0
Note: Ferencváros: Á. Varga — Makreckis, Cissé, Raul Gustavo, Ramírez (Ćivić (substituted on) 58') — Abu Fani (Rommens (substituted on) 58'), Maïga (A. Tóth (substituted on) 77'), Kehinde (Gruber (substituted on) 83') — Traoré (Kady (substituted on) 77'), Pešić (Bassey (substituted on) 77'), Owusu (Ben Romdhane (substituted on) 58')

=== In-season ===
7 September 2024 Friendly	Balatonfüred FC (NB III)	0–2	Ferencváros	Balatonfüred
15:00 CEST		Report	Raul Gustavo 8'; Zachariassen 29'
Note: Ferencváros 1st half: Á. Varga — Makreckis, Cissé, Raul Gustavo, Ramírez — A. Tóth, Pappoe — Owusu, Zachariassen, Kehinde — Saldanha Ferencváros 2nd half: G. Szécsi — Kaján, Szalai, Gartenmann, Pászka — A. Tóth (Knoester (substituted on) 81'), Pappoe — Owusu, Zachariassen (Ćivić (substituted on) 65'), Kehinde — Kady

Winter training camp in Cartagena, Spain, from 5 to 15 January 2025.

10 January 2025 Friendly	Preußen Münster (Bundesliga II) (German Football Association)	0–0	Ferencváros	Spain
14:00 CET	Kyerewaa (yellow card) 67'; Deters (yellow card) 80'	Report
Note: Ferencváros 1st half: Á. Varga — Makreckis, Lakatos, Szalai, Raul Gustavo — Abu Fani, Rommens — Gruber, Zachariassen, Misidjan — B. Varga • Ferencváros 2nd half: Á. Varga (Radnóti (substituted on) 83') — Kaján, Cissé, Gartenmann, Pászka — Pappoe (A. Tóth (substituted on) 83'), Ben Romdhane, Maïga — Kady, Traoré — Saldanha • Coach: Robbie Keane

15 January 2025 Friendly	Piast Gliwice (Polish I) (Polish Football Association)	1–0	Ferencváros	Spain
14:00 CET	Jorge 30'; Piasecki (yellow card) 74'	Report	Kady (yellow card) 55'
Note: Ferencváros: Dibusz — Makreckis (Kaján (substituted on) 77'), Cissé (Szalai (substituted on) 77'), Gartenmann (Pappoe (substituted on) 77'), Raul Gustavo (Ramírez (substituted on) 65') — Maïga (A. Tóth (substituted on) 65'), Abu Fani (Gruber (substituted on) 77') — Traoré (Zachariassen (substituted on) 65'), Kady (Ćivić (substituted on) 65'), Ben Romdhane (Saldanha (substituted on) 46') — B. Varga (Pesić (substituted on) 65') • Coach: Robbie Keane

== Competitions ==
=== Overall record ===
The Last match and the Final position achieved in competition(s) that have not yet been completed are indicated in italics.

Competition	First match	Last match	Starting round	Final position	Record							
Competition	First match	Last match	Starting round	Final position	Pld	W	D	L	GF	GA	GD	Win %
Nemzeti Bajnokság I	03/08/24	24/05/25	Matchday 2	Winners (gold)	33	20	9	4	64	31	+33	60.61
Magyar Kupa	15/09/24	14/05/25	Round of 64	Runner-up (silver)	6	5	1	0	16	7	+9	83.33
UEFA Champions League	23/07/24	13/08/24	2nd qualifying round	3rd qualifying round	4	2	1	1	8	4	+4	50.00
UEFA Europa League	22/08/24	20/02/25	Play-off (for League Phase)	Knockout phase, Play-off	12	5	2	5	17	19	−2	41.67
Total					55	32	13	10	105	61	+44	58.18

Last updated: 24 May 2025
Source: Soccerway

• Nemzeti Bajnokság I: Domestic league;
• Magyar Kupa: Domestic cup;

=== Nemzeti Bajnokság I ===
==== League table ====
Pos	Team	Pld	W	D	L	GF	GA	GD	Pts	Qualification or relegation
1	Ferencváros (C)	33	20	9	4	64	31	+33	69	Qualification for the Champions League second qualifying round
2	Puskás Akadémia	33	20	6	7	58	38	+20	66	Qualification for the Conference League second qualifying round
3	Paks	33	16	9	8	65	47	+18	57	Qualification for the Europa League first qualifying round (Note: Paks qualified for the Europa League as the 2024–25 Magyar Kupa winners. As a result, the second Conference League berth was passed to the team in 4th place.)
4	Győr	33	14	11	8	49	37	+12	53	Qualification for the Conference League second qualifying round
5	MTK	33	13	7	13	53	47	+6	46	

Source: Hungarian Football Federation (in Hungarian)
Rules for classification: 1) Points; 2) Matches won; 3) Goal difference; 4) Goals scored; 5) Head-to-head points; 6) Head-to-head goal difference; 7) Fair play ranking; 8) Drawing of lots.
(C) Champions

==== Results summary ====
Overall								Home						Away					
Pld	W	D	L	GF	GA	GD	Pts	W	D	L	GF	GA	GD	W	D	L	GF	GA	GD
33	20	9	4	64	31	+33	69	10	5	1	34	11	+23	10	4	3	30	20	+10

Last updated: 24 May 2025.
Source: Soccerway

==== Results by round ====
A = Away; H = Home; W = Win; D = Draw; L = Loss

Round	2	3	4	6	7	8	9	10	11	12	13	14	15	1^{1}	16	17	18	5^{2}	19	20	21	22	23	24	25	26	27	28	29	30	31	32	33
Ground	H	A	H	H	A	H	A	H	A	H	A	H	A	A	H	A	H	A	A	H	A	H	A	H	A	H	A	H	A	H	A	H	A
Result	W	W	W	W	W	W	L	W	D	D	W	D	D	L	W	W	D	D	L	L	W	D	W	W	D	W	W	W	W	D	W	W	W
Position	6	3	3	1	2	1	1	1	1	1	1	1	2	2	2	2	2	1	2	2	2	2	2	2	2	2	1	1	1	1	1	1	1
Points	3	6	9	12	15	18	18	21	22	23	26	27	28	28	31	34	35	36	36	36	39	40	43	46	47	50	53	56	59	60	63	66	69
Manager	J	J	J	J	J	J	J	J	J	J	J	J	J	J	J	J	K	K	K	K	K	K	K	K	K	K	K	K	K	K	K	K	K

Updated to match(es) played on 18 May 2025. Source:
Notes:
^{1} Round 1 match (Debrecen–Ferencváros) has been postponed to 4 December 2024.

^{2} Round 5 match (Zalaegerszeg–Ferencváros) has been postponed to 5 February 2025.

Manager: • J Jansen • K Keane

==== Matches ====
Win Draw Loss Postponed

3 August 2024 2	Ferencváros	1–0	Kecskemét	Budapest
19:45 CEST	Traoré 22'	Report	Vattay (yellow card) 90+5'	Stadium: Ferencváros Stadion; Attendance: 9,977; Referee: Gergő Bogár; Assistant referees: Balázs Buzás, Gergely Becséri
Note: Ferencváros: Dibusz (c) — Makreckis, Raul Gustavo, Cissé (Botka (substituted on) 62'), Ramírez – Rommens, Maïga (Ben Romdhane (substituted on) 62') — Traoré (Kady (substituted on) 62'), Zachariassen (Abu Fani (substituted on) 85'), Owusu (Ćivić (substituted on) 73') — Pešić • Manager: Pascal Jansen

10 August 2024 3	Diósgyőr	0–2	Ferencváros	Miskolc
16:00 CEST	Saničanin (yellow card) 20'; Szatmári (yellow card) 42'; Edomwonyi (yellow card) 64'; D. Gera (yellow card) 83'; Lund (yellow card) 90+5'	Report	Ben Romdhane 21' (pen.), 90+3'	Stadium: Diósgyőri Stadion; Attendance: 8,050; Referee: Mihály Káprály; Assistant referees: Balázs Szert, Róbert Horváth
Note: Ferencváros: Dibusz (c) — Makreckis, Cissé, Raul Gustavo, Ćivić (Ramírez (substituted on) 59') — Maïga (Rommens (substituted on) 59'), Ben Romdhane — Kady (Zachariassen (substituted on) 59'), Abu Fani, Traoré (Pappoe (substituted on) 88') — Bassey (Kehinde (substituted on) 90+5') • Manager: Pascal Jansen

17 August 2024 4	Ferencváros	1–0	Újpest	Budapest
19:30 CEST	Kehinde 90+2'; Abu Fani (red card) 90+12'	Report	Gergényi (yellow card) 36'; Bese (yellow card) 90+4'; Tamás (yellow card) 90+7'; Nunes (yellow card) 90+12'	Stadium: Ferencváros Stadion; Attendance: 18,751; Referee: Gergő Bogár; Assistant referees: István Albert, Balázs Buzás
Note: It is the 242nd Derby between the two teams. Ferencváros won 119 matches, Újpest won 61 and 62 ended in a draw. • Ferencváros: Dibusz (c) — Makreckis, Cissé, Raul Gustavo, Ramírez – Abu Fani (Pappoe (substituted on) 78'), Rommens (Maïga (substituted on) 62'), Zachariassen (Kady (substituted on) 78') – Gruber (Kehinde (substituted on) 62'), B. Varga, Ben Romdhane (Traoré (substituted on) 62') • Manager: Pascal Jansen

1 September 2024 6	Ferencváros	2–1	Nyíregyháza	Budapest
19:45 CEST	Gartenmann 19'; Botka (yellow card) 37'; B. Varga 59' (pen.); Dibusz (yellow card) 79'; Zachariassen (yellow card) 81'	Report	Keita (yellow card) 28'; Alaxai (yellow card) 32'; Kovácsréti (yellow card) 34' (goal) 65'; Baki (yellow card) 85'; Jokic (yellow card) 85'	Stadium: Ferencváros Stadion; Attendance: 8,175; Referee: Bence Csonka; Assistant referees: Vencel Tóth II, Balázs Szert
Note: Ferencváros: Dibusz (c) — Botka (Makreckis (substituted on) 74'), Gartenmann, Raul Gustavo, Ćivić — Maïga (Pappoe (substituted on) 74'), Ben Romdhane (Traoré (substituted on) 62') — Kady, Zachariassen, Gruber (Bassey (substituted on) 89') — B. Varga (Kehinde (substituted on) 62') • Manager: Pascal Jansen

20 September 2024 7	MTK	1–3	Ferencváros	Budapest
20:00 CEST	Hey (yellow card) 5'; I. Bognár 18' (pen.)	Report	Ramírez (yellow card) 16'; B. Varga 25'; Raul Gustavo 44'; Ben Romdhane (yellow card) 61'; Saldanha 80'	Stadium: Hidegkuti Nándor Stadion; Attendance: 4,815; Referee: Ferenc Karakó; Assistant referees: Buzás Balázs, Belicza Bence
Note: Ferencváros: Dibusz (c) — Makreckis (Botka (substituted on) 76'), Cissé, Raul Gustavo, Ramírez (Ćivić (substituted on) 76') — Rommens, Ben Romdhane (Maïga (substituted on) 66') — Traoré (Kady (substituted on) 84'), Zachariassen, Kehinde (Saldanha (substituted on) 66') — B. Varga • Manager: Pascal Jansen

29 September 2024 8	Ferencváros	3–0	Puskás Akadémia	Budapest
18:00 CEST	Maïga (yellow card) 41'; Saldanha 65', 77', 82'	Report	Maceiras (yellow card) 44'; Favorov (yellow card) 81'; Stronati (yellow card) 85'	Stadium: Ferencváros Stadion; Attendance: 11,767; Referee: Gergő Bogár; Assistant referees: István Albert, Balázs Szert
Note: Ferencváros: Dibusz (c) — Gartenmann, Cissé, Raul Gustavo, Ćivić (Ramírez (substituted on) 88') — Maïga, Abu Fani (Pappoe (substituted on) 88'), Ben Romdhane — Traoré (Zachariassen (substituted on) 64'), Gruber (Kehinde (substituted on) 64') — B. Varga (Saldanha (substituted on) 64') • Manager: Pascal Jansen

6 October 2024 9	Paks	3–1	Ferencváros	Paks
18:00 CEST	Osváth 2' (yellow card) 79'; Böde 35'; Windecker (yellow card) 54'; B. Tóth 69'	Report	Szalai (yellow card) 61'; Kady 62'; B. Varga (yellow card) 72'	Stadium: Fehérvári úti Stadion; Attendance: 4,388; Referee: Balázs Berke; Assistant referees: Georgiou Theodoros, Péter Ország
Note: Ferencváros: Dibusz (c) — Gartenmann (Makreckis (substituted on) 46'), Cissé, Szalai (Ćivić (substituted on) 70'), Ramírez (Traoré (substituted on) 79') — Abu Fani, Kady, Maïga (Rommens (substituted on) 46') — Kehinde, B. Varga, Zachariassen (Saldanha (substituted on) 46') • Manager: Pascal Jansen; Player of the match: Attila Osváth, Paks 8.3 • Best player of Ferencváros: Kady 8.0 (Source:)

20 October 2024 10	Ferencváros	2–0	Fehérvár	Budapest
17:45 CEST	Saldanha 23'; Gartenmann (yellow card) 40'; Kady 56' (pen.); Kehinde (red card) 62'	Report	Simut (yellow card) 14'; Bedi (yellow card) 31'	Stadium: Ferencváros Stadion; Attendance: 11,105; Referee: Péter Antal; Assistant referees: Gergő Vígh-Tarsonyi, Norbert Bornemissza
Note: Ferencváros: Dibusz (c) — Makreckis, Cissé, Gartenmann, Ćivić — Maïga (Abu Fani (substituted on) 46'), Rommens — Traoré (Zachariassen (substituted on) 73'), Kady (Misidjan (substituted on) 67'), Kehinde — Saldanha (B. Varga (substituted on) 67') • Manager: Pascal Jansen; Player of the match: Dénes Dibusz, Ferencváros 7.8 (Source:)

27 October 2024 11	Győr	1–1	Ferencváros	Győr
17:45 CET	Ouro 45'; Marku (yellow card) 74'	Report	Traoré 66'; Kady (yellow card) 77'	Stadium: ETO Park; Attendance: 7,765; Referee: József Erdős; Assistant referees: Vencel Tóth II, József Aradi
Note: Ferencváros: Dibusz (c) — Makreckis, Cissé (Gruber (substituted on) 64'), Gartenmann, Ramírez — Rommens (Abu Fani (substituted on) 46'), Maïga (Zachariassen (substituted on) 59') — Traoré, Kady, Ben Romdhane (B. Varga (substituted on) 46') — Saldanha (Misidjan (substituted on) 46') • Manager: Pascal Jansen; Player of the match: Kady Borges, Ferencváros 7.9 (Source:)

3 November 2024 12	Ferencváros	2–2	Debrecen	Budapest
14:45 CET	Gartenmann (yellow card) 50'; Traoré 62'; Makreckis (yellow card) 83'; Gruber 85'	Report	T. Szűcs (yellow card) 57'; Bárány 72'; Drešković 80'; Lagator (yellow card) 90+1'	Stadium: Ferencváros Stadion; Attendance: 11,375; Referee: Gergő Bogár; Assistant referees: István Albert, Bence Belicza
Note: Ferencváros: Dibusz (c) — Makreckis, Cissé, Gartenmann, Ćivić — Maïga (Gruber (substituted on) 83'), Abu Fani (Rommens (substituted on) 57') — Traoré, Kady (Ben Romdhane (substituted on) 74'), Zachariassen (Saldanha (substituted on) 57') — B. Varga • Manager: Pascal Jansen; Player of the match: Meldin Drešković, Debrecen 8.9 • Best player of Ferencváros: Adama Traoré 8.0 (Source:)

10 November 2024 13	Kecskemét	0–1	Ferencváros	Kecskemét
18:00 CET	L. Katona (yellow card) 35'; Pálinkás (yellow card) 49'; Rjaskó (yellow card) 49'; Bocskay (yellow card) 63'	Report	Kady (yellow card) 35' (yellow-red card) 63'; Kehinde 85'	Stadium: Széktói Stadion; Attendance: 4,732; Referee: Mihály Káprály; Assistant referees: Georgiou Theodoros, Dániel Szalai
Note: Ferencváros: Dibusz (c) — Makreckis (Traoré (substituted on) 80'), Botka, Gartenmann, Ramírez (Kaján (substituted on) 80'), Ćivić — Zachariassen (Kehinde (substituted on) 68'), Rommens, Abu Fani (Maïga (substituted on) 68'), Kady — B. Varga (Saldanha (substituted on) 68') • Manager: Pascal Jansen; Player of the match: Matheus Saldanha, Ferencváros 7.6 (Source:)

24 November 2024 14	Ferencváros	3–3	Diósgyőr	Budapest
15:30 CET	B. Varga 42' (yellow card) 71'; Botka (yellow card) 44'; Rommens 68'; Abu Fani 70' (yellow card) 85'	Report	Acolatse 7' (yellow card) 88'; Huszár 20'; Edomwonyi (yellow card) 23'; Bényei 41'; Holdampf (yellow card) 86'; Chorbadzhiyski (yellow card) 90+3'; Odyntsov (yellow card) 90+5'	Stadium: Ferencváros Stadion; Attendance: 8,723; Referee: Ferenc Karakó; Assistant referees: Buzás Balázs, Dávid Rózsa
Note: Ferencváros: Dibusz (c) — Makreckis, Botka (Cissé (substituted on) 46'), Gartenmann, Pászka (Ramírez (substituted on) 46') — Abu Fani, Rommens — Zachariassen (Traoré (substituted on) 66'), Kehinde (Maïga (substituted on) 76'), Gruber (Saldanha (substituted on) 46') — B. Varga • Manager: Pascal Jansen; Player of the match: Mohammad Abu Fani, Ferencváros 9.5 (Source:)

1 December 2024 15	Újpest	0–0	Ferencváros	Budapest
19:30 CET	Banai (yellow card) 14'; Fiola (yellow card) 14'; Onovo (yellow card) 22'; Ljujić (yellow card) 38'	Report	Maïga (yellow card) 32'; Makreckis (yellow card) 37'; Ben Romdhane (yellow card) 63'; Pešić (yellow card) 84'	Stadium: Szusza Ferenc Stadion; Attendance: 10.273; Referee: Balázs Berke; Assistant referees: Vencel Tóth II, Gergő Vígh-Tarsonyi
Note: Ferencváros: Dibusz (c) — Makreckis, Cissé, Gartenmann, Ramírez — Maïga, Abu Fani (Rommens (substituted on) 65') — Zachariassen (Saldanha (substituted on) 78'), Ben Romdhane (Kehinde (substituted on) 65'), Traoré — B. Varga (Pešić (substituted on) 78') • Manager: Pascal Jansen; Player of the match: André Duarte, Újpest 8.1 • Best player of Ferencváros: Adama Traoré 7.7 (Source:)

5 December 2024 1	Debrecen	5–4	Ferencváros	Debrecen
20:00 CET	Bárány 2', 5', 17'; Domingues 49', 59'; Ferenczi (yellow card) 49'; Szuhodovszki (yellow card) 53'; Drešković (yellow card) 73'; Kaye (yellow card) 87'	Report	B. Varga 30' (pen.), 42' (yellow card) 45'; Szalai (yellow card) 4' (yellow-red card) 31'; Saldanha 47'; Cissé 82'; Kady (yellow card) 83'; Ben Romdhane (yellow card) 86'	Stadium: Nagyerdei Stadion; Attendance: 5,011; Referee: Bence Csonka; Assistant referees: Norbert Bornemissza, Balázs Szalai
Note: Ferencváros: Dibusz (c) — Makreckis, Szalai, Cissé, Ramírez (Ben Romdhane (substituted on) 86') — Abu Fani (Gruber (substituted on) 72'), Maïga — Traoré (Zachariassen (substituted on) 65'), Kady, Saldanha (Misidjan (substituted on) 65') — B. Varga (Pešić (substituted on) 72') • Manager: Pascal Jansen (yellow card) 90+1'; Player of the match: Brandon Domingues, Debrecen 9.4 • Best player of Ferencváros: Barnabás Varga 8.7 (Source:)

8 December 2024 16	Ferencváros	1–0	Zalaegerszeg	Budapest
20:00 CET	B. Varga 11'	Report		Stadium: Ferencváros Stadion; Attendance: 6,897; Referee: Csaba Pintér; Assistant referees: Balázs Szert, Bence Belicza
Note: Ferencváros: Dibusz (c) — Makreckis, Cissé, Gartenmann, Pászka — Maïga, Rommens — Traoré (Zachariassen (substituted on) 59'), Kady (Ben Romdhane (substituted on) 34'), Kehinde (Gruber (substituted on) 81') — B. Varga (Pešić (substituted on) 59') • Manager: Pascal Jansen; Player of the match: Kady, Ferencváros 7.7 (Source:)

15 December 2024 17	Nyíregyháza	0–1	Ferencváros	Nyíregyháza
15:30 CET	Keresztes (yellow card) 36'; D. Nagy (yellow card) 40'; Toma (yellow card) 76'; Alaxai (yellow card) 77'	Report	Maïga (yellow card) 53'; Traoré (yellow card) 77'; B. Varga 83' (yellow card) 87'; Dibusz (yellow card) 90+3'	Stadium: Városi Stadion; Attendance: 8,000; Referee: Mihály Káprály; Assistant referees: Gergő Vígh-Tarsonyi, Ákos Berényi
Note: Ferencváros: Dibusz (c) — Makreckis (Zachariassen (substituted on) 61'), Cissé, Gartenmann, Raul Gustavo, Pászka (Szalai (substituted on) 89') — Maïga, Kady (Kehinde (substituted on) 61'), Rommens — B. Varga, Pešić (Traoré (substituted on) 61') • Manager: Pascal Jansen; Player of the match: Barnabás Varga, Ferencváros 7.5 (Source:)

2 February 2025 18	Ferencváros	0–0	MTK	Budapest
20:15 CET		Report	Kádár (yellow card) 65'	Stadium: Ferencváros Stadion; Attendance: 6,695; Referee: Balázs Berke; Assistant referees: István Albert, Péter Kóbor
Note: Ferencváros: Á. Varga — Makreckis, Cissé (c), Gartenmann, Ramírez — Rommens, Abu Fani (A. Tóth (substituted on) 72') — Zachariassen (Traoré (substituted on) 59'), Ben Romdhane (Pešić (substituted on) 83'), Kehinde (Joseph (substituted on) 72') — Saldanha (B. Varga (substituted on) 59') • Manager: Robbie Keane; Player of the match: Patrik Demjén, MTK 8.1 • Best player of Ferencváros: Philippe Rommens 7.6 (Source:)

5 February 2025 5	Zalaegerszeg	2–2	Ferencváros	Zalaegerszeg
19:30 CET	Dénes 7', 35'; Csonka (yellow card) 65'; Evangelou (yellow card) 81'	Report	B. Varga 15', 25' (yellow card) 81'; Ćivić (yellow card) 41'	Stadium: ZTE Arena; Attendance: 3,087; Referee: Tamás Bognár; Assistant referees: Balázs Buzás, Balázs Szalai
Note: Ferencváros: Á. Varga — Kaján, Cissé, Gartenmann, Ćivić (Ramírez (substituted on) 46') — Abu Fani, Rommens (Kehinde (substituted on) 63') — Traoré (Gruber (substituted on) 81'), A. Tóth, Ben Romdhane (Joseph (substituted on) 81') — B. Varga (c) • Manager: Robbie Keane; Player of the match: Barnabás Varga, Ferencváros 9.2 (Source:)

9 February 2025 19	Puskás Akadémia	1–0	Ferencváros	Felcsút
18:00 CET	Zs. Nagy 35' (yellow card) 49'; Pécsi (yellow card) 81'; Markgráf (yellow card) 90'	Report	Makreckis (yellow card) 90+1'	Stadium: Pancho Aréna; Attendance: 3,821; Referee: Gergő Bogár; Assistant referees: Balázs Szert, Bence Belicza
Note: Ferencváros: Á. Varga — Makreckis, Cissé, Gartenmann (Kehinde (substituted on) 90+1'), Ćivić — A. Tóth (Joseph (substituted on) 66'), Romão — Ben Romdhane (Ćirković (substituted on) 55'), Abu Fani, Traoré (Pešić (substituted on) 66') — Saldanha • Manager: Robbie Keane; Player of the match: Mohammad Abu Fani, Ferencváros 8.8 (Source:)

16 February 2025 20	Ferencváros	0–2	Paks	Budapest
18:00 CET	Romão (yellow card) 83'; Joseph (yellow card) 87'; Abu Fani (yellow card) 90+4'	Report	Lenzsér (yellow card) 46'; Ötvös (yellow card) 47'; Böde 64', 90+5'; Hinora (yellow card) 90+4'	Stadium: Ferencváros Stadion; Attendance: 7,129; Referee: Ferenc Karakó; Assistant referees: Gergely Becséri, Dávid Rózsa
Note: Ferencváros: Gróf — Gartenmann, Cissé, Raul Gustavo, Ćivić (Pešić (substituted on) 73') — A. Tóth (Abu Fani (substituted on) 61'), Ben Romdhane (Saldanha (substituted on) 46'), Romão — Kehinde (Joseph (substituted on) 61'), B. Varga (c), Traoré (Ćirković (substituted on) 61') • Manager: Robbie Keane; Player of the match: Péter Szappanos, Paks 9.3 • Best player of Ferencváros: Stefan Gartenmann 8.1 (Source:)

23 February 2025 21	Fehérvár	1–3	Ferencváros	Székesfehérvár
18:00 CET	Simut (yellow card) 45'; B. Szabó 56' (pen.); Serafimov (yellow card) 57' (yellow-red card) 74'; Kalmár (yellow card) 78'; Šaponjić (yellow card) 84'	Report	Abu Fani 2'; Makreckis 7'; Ćirković (yellow card) 74'; Ben Romdhane 85'	Stadium: Sóstói Stadion; Attendance: 4,229; Referee: Mihály Káprály; Assistant referees: Balázs Buzás, Balázs Szalai
Note: Ferencváros: Gróf — Makreckis, Cissé, Gartenmann, Ramírez — Romão (Rommens (substituted on) 60'), Abu Fani (Ben Romdhane (substituted on) 76') — Traoré (Keïta (substituted on) 88'), Kehinde (Ćirković (substituted on) 60'), A. Tóth — B. Varga (c) (Pešić (substituted on) 88') • Manager: Robbie Keane; Player of the match: Gergely Nagy, Fehérvár 8.6 • Best player of Ferencváros: Mohammad Abu Fani 8.0 (Source:)

2 March 2025 22	Ferencváros	2–2	Győr	Budapest
18:00 CET	Pešić 79' (yellow card) 83'; Saldanha 84'	Report	Marku 11' (yellow card) 44'; Gavrić (yellow card) 40'; Benbouali 48' (pen.); R. Tóth (yellow card) 67'; Petráš (yellow card) 90+7'	Stadium: Ferencváros Stadion; Attendance: 8,773; Referee: Gergő Bogár; Assistant referees: Péter Kóbor, Péter Garai
Note: Ferencváros: Gróf — Makreckis, Gartenmann, Cissé (c), Ramírez (Kehinde (substituted on) 56') — Romão (Keïta (substituted on) 56'), A. Tóth — Ćirković (Joseph (substituted on) 69'), Ben Romdhane (Pešić (substituted on) 46'), Zachariassen (Traoré (substituted on) 56') — Saldanha • Manager: Robbie Keane; Player of the match: Matheus Saldanha, Ferencváros 7.8 (Source:)

9 March 2025 23	Debrecen	0–1	Ferencváros	Debrecen
18:00 CET	Domingues (yellow card) 55'; Lang (yellow card) 90+2'	Report	Pešić 35'; A. Tóth (yellow card) 49'; Gartenmann (yellow card) 65'; Romão (yellow card) 78' (yellow-red card) 90+4'; Makreckis (yellow card) 89'	Stadium: Nagyerdei Stadion; Attendance: 10,634; Referee: Balázs Berke; Assistant referees: Vencel Tóth II, Bence Belicza
Note: Ferencváros: Dibusz (c) — Makreckis (Kaján (substituted on) 89'), Gartenmann, Cissé, Raul Gustavo — Keïta (Maïga (substituted on) 59'), Romão, A. Tóth, Ćivić (Ramírez (substituted on) 74') — Pešić (B. Varga (substituted on) 59'), Saldanha (Zachariassen (substituted on) 89') • Manager: Robbie Keane; Player of the match: Stefan Gartenmann, Ferencváros 7.7 (Source:)

16 March 2025 24	Ferencváros	4–0	Kecskemét	Budapest
15:00 CET	Pešić 10', 72' (pen.); Maïga 31'; Raul Gustavo 78'; Ben Romdhane (yellow card) 85'	Report	Belényesi (yellow card) 36'; Vágó (yellow card) 57'; L. Katona (yellow card) 77'; Vattay (yellow card) 77'	Stadium: Ferencváros Stadion; Attendance: 10,107; Referee: Csaba Pintér; Assistant referees: Balázs Szert, Péter Ország
Note: Ferencváros: Dibusz (c) — Makreckis, Gartenmann (Szalai (substituted on) 80'), Cissé, Raul Gustavo, Ćivić — A. Tóth, Maïga (Zachariassen (substituted on) 80'), Keïta (Abu Fani (substituted on) 75') — Pešić (Ben Romdhane (substituted on) 80'), B. Varga (Saldanha (substituted on) 69') • Manager: Robbie Keane; Player of the match: Aleksandar Pešić, Ferencváros 8.3 (Source:)

30 March 2025 25	Diósgyőr	1–1	Ferencváros	Miskolc
17:00 CEST	Bárdos (yellow card) 17'; Vallejo (yellow card) 31'; Požeg Vancaš 41'	Report	Ćivić (yellow card) 15' (yellow-red card) 24'; B. Varga 32' (pen.); Traoré (yellow card) 42'; Makreckis (yellow card) 61'	Stadium: Diósgyőri Stadion; Attendance: 10,344; Referee: Gergő Bogár; Assistant referees: Georgiou Theodoros, Péter Garai
Note: Ferencváros: Dibusz (c) — Makreckis, Gartenmann, Cissé, Raul Gustavo (Szalai (substituted on) 54') — Maïga, Keïta (Romão (substituted on) 71') — Pešić (Traoré (substituted on) 33'), A. Tóth, Ćivić — B. Varga (Saldanha (substituted on) 71') • Manager: Robbie Keane; Player of the match: Barnabás Varga, Ferencváros 8.0 (Source:)

6 April 2025 26	Ferencváros	2–0	Újpest	Budapest
19:00 CEST	Maïga 18'; Pešić 45'; Abu Fani (yellow card) 77'	Report	Lacoux (yellow card) 37'; Fiola (yellow card) 61'; Karamoko (yellow card) 73'; Bese (yellow card) 75'	Stadium: Ferencváros Stadion; Attendance: 18,557; Referee: Bence Csonka; Assistant referees: István Albert, Balázs Buzás
Note: Ferencváros: Dibusz (c) — Gartenmann, Cissé, Szalai – Kaján, A. Tóth, Maïga, Keïta (Abu Fani (substituted on) 57'), Traoré (Ramírez (substituted on) 83') – Pešić (Saldanha (substituted on) 78'), B. Varga • Manager: Robbie Keane; Player of the match: Alex Tóth, Ferencváros 8.3 (Source:)

12 April 2025 27	Zalaegerszeg	0–2	Ferencváros	Zalaegerszeg
19:45 CEST	Csonka (yellow card) 45'	Report	Szalai (yellow card) 25' (goal) 79'; Gartenmann (yellow card) 58'; Saldanha 84'	Stadium: ZTE Arena; Attendance: 6,451; Referee: Csaba Pintér; Assistant referees: Norbert Bornemissza, Péter Ország
Note: Ferencváros: Dibusz (c) — Kaján (Ramírez (substituted on) 61'), Gartenmann, Cissé, Szalai — A. Tóth, Keïta (Zachariassen (substituted on) 61'), Maïga (Abu Fani (substituted on) 61'), Ćivić (Kehinde (substituted on) 46') — Pešić (Saldanha (substituted on) 74'), B. Varga • Manager: Robbie Keane; Player of the match: Gábor Szalai, Ferencváros 7.8 (Source:)

20 April 2025 28	Ferencváros	7–0	Nyíregyháza	Budapest
15:45 CEST	Pešić 2', 35'; Saldanha 21', 53'; A. Tóth 59'; Joseph 81'; B. Varga 85'; Makreckis (yellow card) 89'	Report	Jokić (yellow card) 22'; M. Kovács (yellow card) 24'; Eppel (yellow card) 71'	Stadium: Ferencváros Stadion; Attendance: 10,765; Referee: Gergő Bogár; Assistant referees: Balázs Szert, Bence Belicza
Note: Ferencváros: Dibusz (c) — Gartenmann, Cissé, Szalai — Makreckis, Maïga (Romão (substituted on) 57'), Abu Fani (Madarász (substituted on) 71'), Ćivić – A. Tóth (Ben Romdhane (substituted on) 62') — Saldanha (Joseph (substituted on) 62'), Pešić (B. Varga (substituted on) 57') • Manager: Robbie Keane; Player of the match: Matheus Saldanha, Ferencváros 9.2 (Source:)

27 April 2025 29	MTK	2–3	Ferencváros	Budapest
15:30 CEST	Kata (yellow card) 44'; Jurina 58'; Polievka 63'; Bognár (yellow card) 90+3'	Report	Gartenmann 9'; Szalai 13'; Pešić 39'; Szalai (yellow card) 76'; Abu Fani (yellow card) 86'	Stadium: Hidegkuti Nándor Stadion; Attendance: 4,831; Referee: Mihály Káprály; Assistant referees: Vencel Tóth II, Zoltán Horváth
Note: Ferencváros: Dibusz (c) — Gartenmann, Cissé (Zachariassen (substituted on) 82'), Szalai — Kaján (Ben Romdhane (substituted on) 90+3'), A. Tóth, Maïga (Abu Fani (substituted on) 59'), Romão, Ćivić (Ramírez (substituted on) 59') — Pešić (Joseph (substituted on) 59'), B. Varga • Manager: Robbie Keane; Player of the match: Eldar Ćivić, Ferencváros 8.3 (Source:)

3 May 2025 30	Ferencváros	1–1	Puskás Akadémia	Budapest
19:30 CEST	Cissé (yellow card) 36'; B. Varga 52'	Report	Szalai 42' (o.g.); Kerezsi (yellow card) 90+1'	Stadium: Ferencváros Stadion; Attendance: 19,021; Referee: Tamás Bognár; Assistant referees: Balázs Buzás, Péter Kóbor
Note: Ferencváros: Dibusz (c) — Gartenmann, Cissé, Szalai — Makreckis, Romão, A. Tóth (Zachariassen (substituted on) 77'), Maïga (Abu Fani (substituted on) 46'), Ćivić (Traoré (substituted on) 84') — Pešić (Saldanha (substituted on) 54'), B. Varga • Manager: Robbie Keane; Player of the match: Barnabás Varga, Ferencváros 8.0 (Source:)

10 May 2025 31	Paks	2–3	Ferencváros	Paks
19:30 CEST	Ötvös (yellow card) 5'; Gyurkits 27'; Ádám (yellow card) 34'; B. Tóth (yellow card) 55'; Vécsei (red card) 64'; Vas (yellow card) 86'; Hinora 89'	Report	Saldanha (yellow card) 10'; Szalai 57'; Joseph 72', 90+3'	Stadium: Fehérvári úti Stadion; Attendance: 4,500; Referee: Gergő Bogár; Assistant referees: István Albert, Balázs Buzás
Note: Ferencváros: Dibusz (c) — Cissé, Szalai, Gartenmann — Makreckis, A. Tóth (Joseph (substituted on) 56'), Maïga, Zachariassen (Abu Fani (substituted on) 56'), Traoré (Raul Gustavo (substituted on) 90+5') — Saldanha (Keïta (substituted on) 77'), B. Varga (Pešić (substituted on) 90+5') • Manager: Robbie Keane; Player of the match: Lenny Joseph, Ferencváros 8.6 (Source:)

18 May 2025 32	Ferencváros	3–0	Fehérvár	Budapest
19:30 CEST	Gartenmann 12'; Pešić 51'; A. Tóth 83'	Report	Kalandadze (yellow card) 36'; Melnyk (yellow card) 54'	Stadium: Ferencváros Stadion; Attendance: 11,957; Referee: Mihály Káprály; Assistant referees: Georgiou Theodoros, Balázs Szalai
Note: Ferencváros: Dibusz (c) — Makreckis, Gartenmann, Cissé (Guilherme Henrique (substituted on) 86'), Szalai — Keïta — A. Tóth, Zachariassen (Abu Fani (substituted on) 62'), Ćivić (Ramírez (substituted on) 75') — Joseph (Ćirković (substituted on) 75'), Pešić (B. Varga (substituted on) 62') • Manager: Robbie Keane; Player of the match: Eldar Ćivić, Ferencváros 9.0 (Source:)

24 May 2025 33	Győr	1–2	Ferencváros	Győr
20:00 CEST	Krpić (yellow card) 31' (goal) 80'; Vitális (yellow card) 59'; Nfansu (yellow card) 88'	Report	Szalai 45+1'; Joseph 54'; A. Tóth (yellow card) 88'	Stadium: ETO Park; Attendance: 7,999; Referee: Balázs Berke; Assistant referees: Balázs Buzás, Péter Kóbor
Note: Ferencváros: Dibusz (c) — Gartenmann, Cissé, Szalai — Makreckis, Keïta (Abu Fani (substituted on) 73'), Maïga (Zachariassen (substituted on) 85'), Ramírez — A. Tóth — Joseph (Kehinde (substituted on) 85'), Pešić (B. Varga (substituted on) 64') • Manager: Robbie Keane; Player of the match: Alex Tóth, Ferencváros 7.8 (Source:)

=== Magyar Kupa ===
==== Round of 64 ====
The draw for the Round of 64 was held on 26 August 2024. Budafok also started the Magyar Kupa competitions in this round.

15 September 2024 R64	Budafok (NB II)	0–3	Ferencváros	Budafok (Budapest)
15:30 CEST	Kálnoki-Kis (yellow card) 29'; Kun (yellow card) 40'	Report	Saldanha 61', 71'; Abu Fani 64'	Stadium: Promontor utcai Stadion; Attendance: 2,000; Referee: Mihály Káprály; Assistant referees: Georgiou Theodoros, Gergely Becséri
Note: Ferencváros: Dibusz (c) — Makreckis (Kaján (substituted on) 77'), Cissé, Szalai, Ramírez (Ćivić (substituted on) 77') — Pappoe (Rommens (substituted on) 60'), Abu Fani — Kady, Zachariassen (Traoré (substituted on) 60'), Kehinde — Pešić (Saldanha (substituted on) 60') • Coach: Pascal Jansen

==== Round of 32 ====
The draw for the Round of 64 was held on 16 September 2024. In the draw Ferencváros got Tiszafüred as their opponent, who play in NB III. In the First round Tiszafüred matched Hidasnémeti (MB I) and defeated 19–0 away. In the Second round Dunavarsány matched Karancslapujtő (MB I) and defeated 4–1 away.

31 October 2024 R32	Tiszafüred (NB III)	1–2	Ferencváros	Tiszafüred
12:30 CET	F. Kalmár 48'	Report	Ben Romdhane (yellow card) 49'; Zachariassen 51', 55'; A. Tóth (yellow card) 70'	Stadium: Lipcsey Elemér Sporttelep; Attendance: 2,000; Referee: Márton Rúsz; Assistant referees: Róbert Horváth, Ákos Berényi
Note: Ferencváros: Á. Varga — Botka, Szalai (Gartenmann (substituted on) 56'), Knoester, Pászka (Ćivić (substituted on) 84') — A. Tóth, Ben Romdhane (Maïga (substituted on) 56') — Gruber (Saldanha (substituted on) 56'), Zachariassen, Kehinde — B. Varga (c) (Misidjan (substituted on) 70') • Coach: Pascal Jansen

==== Round of 16 ====
The draw for the Round of 32 was held on 31 October 2024. In the draw Ferencváros got Győri ETO FC as their opponent, who play in NB I. In the Round of 64 Győr matched Putnok (NB III) and defeated 6–2 away. In the Round of 32 Győr matched Mosonmagyaróvár (NB III) and defeated 3–0 away.

27 February 2025 R16	Győr (NB I)	3–4 (a.e.t.)	Ferencváros	Győr
20:00 CET	Gavrić 12'; Vitális 52'; Romão 54' (o.g.); Bitri (yellow card) 63'; Krpić (yellow card) 70'; Benbouali (yellow card) 78'; Sahli (yellow card) 90+3'; Anton (yellow card) 108'	Report	Ben Romdhane 33'; B. Varga 34' (pen.), 50'; Romão (yellow card) 90'; Zachariassen 117'; A. Tóth (yellow card) 110'	Stadium: ETO Park; Attendance: 1,800; Referee: Bence Csonka; Assistant referees: Vencel Tóth II, Norbert Bornemissza
Note: Ferencváros: Gróf — Makreckis, Gartenmann, Cissé, Ćivić (Ramírez (substituted on) 53') — A. Tóth, Romão — Ćirković (Joseph (substituted on) 79'), Ben Romdhane (Zachariassen (substituted on) 79'), Traoré (Kehinde (substituted on) 61' (substituted off) 118' (Raul Gustavo (substituted on) 118')) — B. Varga (c) (Saldanha (substituted on) 61') • Manager: Robbie Keane

==== Quarter-final ====
The draw for the quarter-finals was held on 27 February 2025. In the draw Ferencváros got Újpest FC as their opponent, who play in Nemzeti Bajnokság I. In the Round of 64 Újpest matched Fémalk-Dunavarsány (MB I, tier 4) and defeated 7–0 away. In the Round of 32 Újpest matched BVSC-Zugló (NB II) and defeated 1–0 away. In the Round of 16 Újpest matched Dorog (NB II) and defeated 1–0 away.

2 April 2025 QF	Ferencváros	3–1	Újpest (NB I)	Budapest
19:45 CEST	Pešić 32'; Makreckis 40'; Saldanha 52' (yellow card) 65'; Gartenmann (yellow card) 82'	Report	Brodić (yellow card) 48' (goal) 82'; Geiger (yellow card) 58'; Ljujić (yellow card) 88'	Stadium: Ferencváros Stadion; Attendance: 16,129; Referee: Mihály Káprály; Assistant referees: Péter Kóbor, Gergely Becséri
Note: Ferencváros: Dibusz (c) — Szalai, Cissé (Raul Gustavo (substituted on) 53'), Gartenmann – Makreckis (Kaján (substituted on) 68'), A. Tóth, Zachariassen, Maïga (Abu Fani (substituted on) 68'), Ćivić – Pešić (B. Varga (substituted on) 78'), Saldanha (Kehinde (substituted on) 78') • Manager: Robbie Keane

==== Semi-final ====
The draw for the quarter-finals was held on 3 April 2025. In the draw Ferencváros got MTK as their opponent, who play in Nemzeti Bajnokság I. In the Round of 64 MTK matched Hódmezővásárhely (NB III) and defeated 2–0 away. In the Round of 32 MTK matched Szeged (NB II) and defeated 3–0 away. In the Round of 16 MTK matched Iváncsa (NB III) and defeated 2–0 away. In the Quarter-final MTK matched Fehérvár (NB I) and defeated 4–2 home.

23 April 2025 SF	Ferencváros	3–1	MTK (NB I)	Budapest
20:00 CEST	Ramírez 45'; Pešić (yellow card) 44' (goal) 51'; Joseph 75'	Report	R. Molnár 16' (yellow card) 90+2'; Beriashvili (yellow card) 44'; P. Kovács I (yellow card) 87'; Kádár (yellow card) 90+3'	Stadium: Ferencváros Stadion; Attendance: 11,057; Referee: Csaba Pintér; Assistant referees: Gergő Vígh-Tarsonyi, Dávid Rózsa
Note: Ferencváros: Dibusz (c) — Makreckis, Cissé, Gartenmann, Szalai — A. Tóth, (Ben Romdhane (substituted on) 74'), Romão, Keïta (Maïga (substituted on) 46'), Ramírez (Ćivić (substituted on) 84') — Saldanha (B. Varga (substituted on) 46'), Pešić (Joseph (substituted on) 74') • Manager: Robbie Keane

==== Final ====
14 May 2025 F	Ferencváros	1–1 (a.e.t.) (3–4 p)	Paks (NB I)	Budapest
19:00 CEST	Joseph 90+4'; Abu Fani (yellow card) 90+5' (On the bench); A. Tóth (yellow card) 107'; Szalai (yellow card) 118'	Report	J. Szabó (yellow card) 34'; B. Tóth 45+1'; Ötvös (yellow card) 55'; Böde (yellow card) 88'; Szappanos (yellow card) 94'; Ádám (yellow card) 96'; Kinyik (yellow card) 105+1'	Stadium: Puskás Aréna; Attendance: 54,762; Referee: Csaba Pintér; Assistant referees: Péter Kóbor, Balázs Szert
	Penalties
	Pešić (penalty missed); Zachariassen (penalty scored); Joseph (penalty missed); Gustavo (penalty scored); Cissé (penalty scored)		Windecker (penalty scored); Ádám (penalty scored); Balogh (penalty missed); Gyurkits (penalty scored); Vécsei (penalty scored)
Note: Ferencváros: Dibusz (c) — Gartenmann (Ćirković (substituted on) 83'), Cissé, Szalai — Makreckis, Maïga (Gustavo (substituted on) 98'), Abu Fani (Joseph (substituted on) 64'), Ćivić (Traoré (substituted on) 65') — A. Tóth — Saldanha (Zachariassen (substituted on) 77'), B. Varga (Pešić (substituted on) 64') • Manager: Robbie Keane

=== UEFA Champions League ===
==== Second qualifying round ====
23 July 2024 First leg	Ferencváros (Hungary)	5–0	(Wales) The New Saints	Budapest, Hungary
20:00 CEST	Traoré 15', 21', 54'; Zachariassen 24'; Marquinhos 62' (pen.) (yellow card) 64'	Report	J. Williams (yellow card) 49'	Stadium: Ferencváros Stadion; Attendance: 16,231; Referee: Guillermo Cuadra Fernández (Royal Spanish Football Federation); Assistant referees: Guadalupe Porras Ayuso, Alejandro Estévez Iglesias
Note: Ferencváros: Dibusz (c) — Makreckis (Botka (substituted on) 77'), Cissé, Raul Gustavo (Knoester (substituted on) 82'), Ramírez — Rommens, Maïga (A. Tóth (substituted on) 77') — Traoré, Zachariassen, Marquinhos (Owusu (substituted on) 77') — Pešić (Kady (substituted on) 77') • Coach: Pascal Jansen

30 July 2024 Second leg	The New Saints (Wales)	1–2 (1–7 agg.)	(Hungary) Ferencváros	Oswestry, Wales
20:00 (19:00 BST)	Brobbell (yellow card) 21'; Baker (yellow card) 60'; McМanus (yellow card) 68'; Daniels 90+1'	Report	Zachariassen 43'; Rommens 62' (pen.)	Stadium: Park Hall; Attendance: 1,022; Referee: Damian Sylwestrzak (Polish Football Association); Assistant referees: Paweł Sokolnicki, Adam Karasewicz
Note: Ferencváros: Dibusz (c) — Makreckis, Cissé (Abena (substituted on) 72'), Raul Gustavo, Ramírez — Maïga (Abu Fani (substituted on) 63'), Rommens — Traoré (Gruber (substituted on) 72'), Zachariassen, Kehinde — Pešić (Kady (substituted on) 63') • Coach: Pascal Jansen

Ferencváros won 7–1 on aggregate.

==== Third qualifying round ====
6 August 2024 First leg	Midtjylland (Denmark)	2–0	(Hungary) Ferencváros	Herning, Denmark
19:15 CEST	Buksa 18'; Franculino 69'	Report	Raul Gustavo (yellow card) 18'; Cissé (yellow card) 42'; Abu Fani (yellow card) 74'; Rommens (yellow card) 83'	Stadium: MCH Arena; Attendance: 8,449; Referee: Matej Jug (Football Association of Slovenia); Assistant referees: Matej Žunič, Manuel Vidali
Note: Ferencváros: Dibusz (c) — Makreckis, Cissé, Raul Gustavo (Knoester (substituted on) 55'), Ramírez — Maïga (Abu Fani (substituted on) 55'), Zachariassen, Rommens — Traoré, Pešić (Ben Romdhane (substituted on) 55'), Kehinde (Ćivić (substituted on) 76') • Coach: Pascal Jansen

13 August 2024 Second leg	Ferencváros (Hungary)	1–1 (1–3 agg.)	(Denmark) Midtjylland	Budapest, Hungary
20:00 CEST	Cissé 17'; Ramírez (yellow card) 40'; Zachariassen (yellow card) 67'; Botka (yellow card) 76'; Kady (yellow card) 87'; Raul Gustavo (red card) 90+6'	Report	Askildsen (yellow card) 6'; Sørensen 50'; J. Andersson (yellow card) 69'	Stadium: Ferencváros Stadion; Attendance: 18,027; Referee: Orel Grinfeeld (Israel Football Association); Assistant referees: Roy Hassan, Idan Yarkoni
Note: Ferencváros: Dibusz (c) — Makreckis (Gruber (substituted on) 83'), Cissé (Sevikyan (substituted on) 83'), Raul Gustavo, Ramírez (Botka (substituted on) 46') — Rommens, Abu Fani — Ben Romdhane, Zachariassen (Kady (substituted on) 75'), Traoré — Pešić (Bassey (substituted on) 43') • Coach: Pascal Jansen

Midtjylland won 3–1 on aggregate.

=== UEFA Europa League ===
==== Play-off round ====
22 August 2024 First leg	Ferencváros (Hungary)	0–0	(Bosnia and Herzegovina) Borac Banja Luka	Budapest, Hungary
21:00 CEST	Misidjan (yellow card) 90+3'	Report	Carolina (yellow card) 22'; Grahovac (yellow card) 74'; Kvržić (yellow card) 78'	Stadium: Ferencváros Stadion; Attendance: 13,167; Referee: Nick Walsh (Scottish Football Association); Assistant referees: Graeme Stewart, Calum Spence
Note: Ferencváros: Dibusz (c) — Makreckis, Cissé, Knoester, Ramírez (Ćivić (substituted on) 69') — Rommens, Abu Fani (Maïga (substituted on) 60') — Traoré, Zachariassen (Kady (substituted on) 82'), Ben Romdhane (Misidjan (substituted on) 60') — B. Varga (Pešić (substituted on) 60') • Coach: Pascal Jansen

29 August 2024 Second leg	Borac Banja Luka (Bosnia and Herzegovina)	1–1 (a.e.t.) (1–1 agg.) (2–3 p)	(Hungary) Ferencváros	Banja Luka, Bosnia and Herzegovina
21:00 CEST	Herrara (yellow card) 92'; Hrelja (yellow card) 96'; Meijers 104' (yellow card) 119'	Report	Maïga (yellow card) 8'; Misidjan (yellow card) 41'; Ben Romdhane (yellow card) 63'; B. Varga (yellow card) 95' (goal) 110' (pen.); Knoester (yellow card) 101'	Stadium: City Stadium; Attendance: 7,833; Referee: Erik Lambrechts (Royal Belgian Football Association); Assistant referees: Jo de Weirdt, Kevin Monteny
	Penalties
	Herrara (penalty missed); Kvržić (penalty scored); Savić (penalty scored); Čavić (penalty missed); Grahovac (penalty missed)		(penalty missed) Rommens; (penalty scored) Ben Romdhane; (penalty scored) Abu Fani; (penalty scored) Kady
Note: Ferencváros: Dibusz (c) — Makreckis, Cissé (Gruber (substituted on) 106'), Knoester, Ramírez (Ćivić (substituted on) 75') — Maïga (Zachariassen (substituted on) 46'), Rommens, Abu Fani, Misidjan (Ben Romdhane (substituted on) 46'), Traoré (Kady (substituted on) 70') — Pešić (B. Varga (substituted on) 85') • Coach: Pascal Jansen

1–1 on aggregate, Ferencváros won 3–2 on penalties.

==== League phase ====
The draw for the League phase was held on 30 August 2024.
The team for League Phase: Goalkeepers: Dibusz, Á. Varga – Defenders: Botka, Cissé, Ćivić, Gartenmann, Raul Gustavo, Kaján, Ramírez, Szalai – Midfielders: Abu Fani, Ben Romdhane, Kady, Maïga, Makreckis, Rommens, A. Tóth, Zachariassen – Forwards: Saldanha, Gruber, Misidjan, Pešić, Traoré, B. Varga

===== League phase table =====
Pos	Team	Pld	W	D	L	GF	GA	GD	Pts	Qualification
15	(Italian Football Federation) Roma	8	3	3	2	10	6	+4	12	Advance to knockout phase play-offs (seeded)
16	(Football Association of the Czech Republic) Viktoria Plzeň	8	3	3	2	13	12	+1	12	Advance to knockout phase play-offs (seeded)
17	(Hungarian Football Federation) Ferencváros	8	4	0	4	15	15	0	12	Advance to knockout phase play-offs (unseeded)
18	(Portuguese Football Federation) Porto	8	3	2	3	13	11	+2	11	Advance to knockout phase play-offs (unseeded)
19	(Royal Dutch Football Association) AZ	8	3	2	3	13	13	0	11	Advance to knockout phase play-offs (unseeded)

Source: UEFA
Rules for classification: League phase tiebreakers

Round	1	2	3	4	5	6	7	8
Ground	A	H	H	A	H	A	A	H
Result	L	L	W	W	W	L	L	W
Position	26	31	23	14	11	16	22	17
Points	0	0	3	6	9	9	9	12

Updated to match(es) played on 30 January 2025. Source: UEFA
A = Away; H = Home; W = Win; D = Draw; L = Loss

===== Matches =====
25 September 2024 1	Anderlecht (Belgium)	2–1	(Hungary) Ferencváros	Brussels, Belgium
21:00 CEST (UTC+2)	Dolberg (yellow card) 42' (goal) 66' (pen.); Verschaeren 61'; Angulo (yellow card) 78' (yellow-red card) 81'; Ashimeru (yellow card) 90+5'	Report	Cissé (yellow card) 19'; Zachariassen (yellow card) 32'; Botka (yellow card) 73'; Traoré 86'; Saldanha (yellow card) 90+2'; Ćivić (yellow card) 90+4'; B. Varga (yellow card) 90+5'	Stadium: Constant Vanden Stock Stadium; Attendance: 15,417; Referee: Julian Weinberger (Austrian Football Association); Assistant referees: Andreas Heidenreich, Maximilian Kolbitsch
Note: Ferencváros: Dibusz (c) — Botka (Gartenmann (substituted on) 76'), Cissé, Szalai, Ramírez (Ćivić (substituted on) 76') — Abu Fani (Maïga (substituted on) 71'), Rommens — Traoré, Zachariassen (Ben Romdhane (substituted on) 71'), Kady (Saldanha (substituted on) 71') — B. Varga • Manager: Pascal Jansen; Player of the match: Yari Verschaeren, Anderlecht 8.6 • Best player of Ferencváros: Adama Traoré 7.7 (Source:)

3 October 2024 2	Ferencváros (Hungary)	1–2	(England) Tottenham Hotspur	Budapest
18:45 CEST (UTC+2)	Ćivić (yellow card) 22'; B. Varga 90'	Report	Sarr 23'; Johnson 86'	Stadium: Ferencváros Stadion; Attendance: 20,795; Referee: Igor Pajač (Croatian Football Federation); Assistant referees: Ivan Mihalj, Vedran Ðurak
Note: Ferencváros: Dibusz (c) — Gartenmann (Makreckis (substituted on) 77'), Cissé, Raul Gustavo, Ramírez — Abu Fani, (Pešić (substituted on) 84') Maïga — Traoré (Kady (substituted on) 77'), Saldanha (Zachariassen (substituted on) 59'), Ćivić (Ben Romdhane (substituted on) 59') — B. Varga • Manager: Pascal Jansen; Player of the match: Pedro Porro, Tottenham 7.9 • Best player of Ferencváros: Barnabás Varga 7.7 (Source:)

24 October 2024 3	Ferencváros (Hungary)	1–0	(France) Nice	Budapest
18:45 CEST (UTC+2)	Bombito 15' (o.g.); B. Varga (yellow card) 19'; Traoré (yellow card) 84'	Report	Bombito (yellow card) 39'; Abdelmonem (yellow card) 45+1'; Rosario (red card) 84'	Stadium: Ferencváros Stadion; Attendance: 18,371; Referee: Anastasios Sidiropoulos (Hellenic Football Federation); Assistant referees: Polychronis Kostaras, Lazaros Dimitriadis
Note: Ferencváros: Dibusz (c) — Makreckis, Rommens, Gartenmann, Ćivić (Ben Romdhane (substituted on) 74') — Abu Fani (Botka (substituted on) 90+6'), Cissé — Traoré, Kady (Maïga (substituted on) 74'), Zachariassen (Ramírez (substituted on) 74') — B. Varga (Saldanha (substituted on) 80') • Manager: Pascal Jansen; Player of the match: Mohamed Abdelmonem, Nice and Dénes Dibusz, Ferencváros 7.9 each (Source:)

7 November 2024 4	Dynamo Kyiv (Ukraine)	0–4	(Hungary) Ferencváros	Hamburg, Germany
21:00 CET (UTC+1)	Shaparenko (yellow card) 58'; Dubinchak (red card) 16'; Brazhko (yellow card) 89'	Report	Zachariassen (yellow card) 22' (goal) 56'; Makreckis (yellow card) 42'; B. Varga 54', 67'; Rommens (yellow card) 58'; Saldanha 76'	Stadium: Volksparkstadion; Attendance: 5,338; Referee: Mohammed Al-Hakim (Swedish Football Association); Assistant referees: Fredrik Klyver, Robin Wilde
Note: Ferencváros: Dibusz (c) — Makreckis (Kaján (substituted on) 63'), Cissé (Botka (substituted on) 55'), Gartenmann, Ramírez — Rommens (Maïga (substituted on) 63'), Abu Fani — Kady, Zachariassen, Traoré (Gruber (substituted on) 76') — B. Varga (Saldanha (substituted on) 75') • Manager: Pascal Jansen; Player of the match: Kady Borges and Barnabás Varga, Ferencváros 8.5 each (Source:)

28 November 2024 5	Ferencváros (Hungary)	4–1	(Sweden) Malmö	Budapest
21:00 CET (UTC+1)	B. Varga 8', 11' (pen.) (yellow card) 68'; Kady 53'; Makreckis 74'	Report	Stryger (yellow card) 15'; Botheim 18' (pen.); Kiese Thelin (yellow card) 90'	Stadium: Ferencváros Stadion; Attendance: 18,891; Referee: Aliyar Aghayev (Association of Football Federations of Azerbaijan); Assistant referees: Zeynal Zeynalov, Akif Amirali
Note: Ferencváros: Dibusz (c) — Makreckis, Cissé (Szalai (substituted on) 86'), Gartenmann, Ramírez — Abu Fani (Rommens (substituted on) 86'), Maïga — Saldanha (Zachariassen (substituted on) 62'), Kady (Ben Romdhane (substituted on) 74'), Traoré — B. Varga (Pešić (substituted on) 86') • Manager: Pascal Jansen; Player of the match: Barnabás Varga, Ferencváros 8.7 (Source:)

12 December 2024 6	PAOK (Greece)	5–0	(Hungary) Ferencváros	Thessaloniki, Greece
18:45 (19:45 UTC+2)	Taison 10' (yellow card) 45+2'; Brandon 29'; Camara (yellow card) 50'; Chalov 76'; Živković 80' (pen.); Despodov 89'	Report	Saldanha (yellow card) 13'; Abu Fani (yellow card) 31'; Ramírez (yellow card) 37'; Gruber (yellow card) 45+2'	Stadium: Toumba Stadium; Attendance: 18,121; Referee: Guillermoa Cuadra (Royal Spanish Football Federation); Assistant referees: Guadalupe Porras Ayuso, Alfredo Rodriguez Moreno
Note: Ferencváros: Dibusz (c) — Makreckis, Cissé (Raul Gustavo (substituted on) 77'), Gartenmann, Ramírez — Maïga (A. Tóth (substituted on) 77'), Abu Fani — Gruber (Misidjan (substituted on) 66'), Rommens (Zachariassen (substituted on) 46'), Traoré (Kady (substituted on) 66') — Saldanha • Coach: Pascal Jansen; Player of the match: Andrija Živković, PAOK 9.2 • Best player of Ferencváros: Philippe Rommens 6.8 (Source:)

23 January 2025 7	Eintracht Frankfurt (Germany)	2–0	(Hungary) Ferencváros	Frankfurt, Germany
21:00 CET (UTC+1)	Uzun (yellow card) 49'; Ekitike 59'; Koch 78'; Trapp (yellow card) 87'; Knauff (yellow card) 90+4'	Report		Stadium: Waldstadion; Attendance: 55,500; Referee: Enea Jorgji (Albanian Football Federation); Assistant referees: Denis Rexha, Ridiger Çokaj
Note: Ferencváros: Dibusz (c) (Á. Varga (substituted on) 33') — Makreckis, Cissé, Gartenmann, Raul Gustavo — Maïga, Abu Fani (A. Tóth (substituted on) 75') — Ben Romdhane (Zachariassen (substituted on) 75'), Kady (Ćivić (substituted on) 46'), Traoré (Saldanha (substituted on) 63') — B. Varga • Manager: Robbie Keane; Player of the match: Can Uzun, Eintracht Frankfurt 7.8 • Best player of Ferencváros: Stefan Gartenmann 7.2 (Source:)

30 January 2025 8	Ferencváros (Hungary)	4–3	(Netherlands) AZ Alkmaar	Budapest
21:00 CET (UTC+1)	Ben Romdhane 9', 45'; B. Varga (yellow card) 12' (goal) 82' (pen.); Traoré 34'; Makreckis (yellow card) 66'	Report	Belić (yellow card) 7'; Kasius (yellow card) 45+3'; Mijnans 76', 90+5'; Parrott 90'	Stadium: Ferencváros Stadion; Attendance: 18,657; Referee: Nenad Minaković (Football Association of Serbia); Assistant referees: Nikola Borović, Boško Božović
Note: Ferencváros: Á. Varga — Makreckis, Gartenmann, Cissé, Ćivić — Maïga (Rommens (substituted on) 30') — Ben Romdhane (Raul Gustavo (substituted on) 83'), Abu Fani (Kady (substituted on) 73'), A. Tóth, Traoré (Zachariassen (substituted on) 73') — B. Varga (c) (Saldanha (substituted on) 83') • Manager: Robbie Keane; Player of the match: Mohamed Ali Ben Romdhane, Ferencváros 9.0 (Source:)

==== Knockout phase ====
The draw for the League phase was held on 31 January 2025.
The team for Knockout phase: Goalkeepers: Dibusz, Á. Varga, Gróf — Defenders: Kaján, Cissé, Ćivić, Gartenmann, Raul Gustavo, Ramírez, Szalai — Midfielders: N. Keita, A. Tóth, Abu Fani, Ben Romdhane, Makreckis, Rommens, Romão, Zachariassen — Forwards: B. Varga, Saldanha, Gruber, Pešić, Traoré, Kehinde
The B-team for Knockout phase: Goalkeepers: Radnóti, Őri, Z. Tóth — Midfielders: Madarász, Lakatos, Manner — Forwards: Gólik, Bagi

===== Play-off =====
13 February 2025 First leg	Ferencváros (Hungary)	1–0	(Czech Republic) Viktoria Plzeň	Budapest
18:45 CET (UTC+1)	Abu Fani 23'; B. Varga (yellow card) 88'	Report	Koubek (yellow card) 87' (manager)	Stadium: Ferencváros Stadion; Attendance: 18,519; Referee: Giorgi Kruashvili (Georgian Football Federation); Assistant referees: Levan Varamishvili, Giorgi Elikashvili
Note: Ferencváros: Gróf — Makreckis, Gartenmann, Cissé, Raul Gustavo — Zachariassen (Ben Romdhane (substituted on) 59'), Romão, Abu Fani (Rommens (substituted on) 80'), Ćivić — Saldanha (Traoré (substituted on) 64'), B. Varga (c) • Manager: Robbie Keane; Player of the match: Mohammad Abu Fani, Ferencváros 8.4 (Source:)

20 February 2025 Second leg	Viktoria Plzeň (Czech Republic)	3–0 (3–1 agg.)	(Hungary) Ferencváros	Plzeň
21:00 CET (UTC+1)	Jemelka 27'; Šulc 35'; Durosinmi 38'; Memić (yellow card) 45+2'; Dweh (yellow card) 76'	Report	Saldanha (yellow card) 14'; Abu Fani (yellow card) 56'	Stadium: Doosan Arena; Attendance: 10,415; Referee: Jérôme Brisard (French Football Federation); Assistant referees: Benjamin Pages, Erwan Finjean
Note: Ferencváros: Gróf — Makreckis (A. Tóth (substituted on) 78'), Cissé (c), Gartenmann, Ramírez (Traoré (substituted on) 46') — Ćivić, Romão (Kehinde (substituted on) 46'), Rommens (Ben Romdhane (substituted on) 78'), Abu Fani, Zachariassen (Pešić (substituted on) 58') — Saldanha • Manager: Robbie Keane; Player of the match: Rafiu Durosinmi, Viktoria Plzeň 8.4 • Best player of Ferencváros: Stefan Gartenmann 7.2 (Source:)

== Squad statistics ==
As of 16 March 2025

Keys
Rk.	Rank	No.	Squad number	Pos.	Position
Opponent	The opponent team without a flag is Hungarian.			(N)	The game was played at a neutral site.
(H)	Ferencvárosi TC were the home team.			(A)	Ferencvárosi TC were the away team.
Player	Young Hungarian Player, who is a Hungarian player and was born 2004 or after				
Player^{⊕}	Player who joined Ferencvárosi TC permanently during the season				
Player^{*}	Player who joined Ferencvárosi TC on loan during the season				
Player^{†}	Player who departed Ferencvárosi TC permanently or on loan during the season				

=== Appearances ===
Includes all competitions for senior teams.
The number of the player's appearances as substitute is indicated by the combination of a plus sign and a figure.
The gold color indicates the maximum appearances only in the competition in which the team has already played at least 2 matches.

No.	Pos.	Nat.	Player	Date of birth (age)	Nemzeti Bajnokság	Magyar Kupa	Champions League	Europa League	Season total	Ref.
Goalkeepers
1	Goalkeeper	(Hungary)	Ádám Varga	12 February 1999 (age 27)	3	1	0	1+1	5+1	
29	Goalkeeper	(Hungary)	Gergő Szécsi	7 February 1989 (age 37)	0	0	0	0	0	
63	Goalkeeper	(Hungary)	Dániel Radnóti	1 October 2006 (age 20)	0	0	0	0	0	
89	Goalkeeper	(Hungary)	Dávid Gróf^{⊕}	17 April 1989 (age 37)	3	1	0	2	6	
90	Goalkeeper	(Hungary)	Dénes Dibusz (c)	16 November 1990 (age 35)	18	1	4	9	32	
Defenders
3	Centre-Back	(Denmark)	Stefan Gartenmann^{⊕}	2 February 1997 (age 29)	19	1+1	0	9+1	29+2	
17	Left-Back	(Bosnia and Herzegovina)	Eldar Ćivić	28 May 1996 (age 30)	11+3	1+2	0+1	5+4	17+10	
22	Centre-Back	(Hungary)	Gábor Szalai^{⊕}	9 June 2000 (age 26)	2+2	2	0	1+1	5+3	
27	Centre-Back	(France)	Ibrahim Cissé	2 May 1996 (age 30)	21+1	2	4	12	39+1	
34	Centre-Back	(Brazil)	Raul Gustavo	24 April 1999 (age 27)	10	0+1	4	3+2	17+3	
44	Centre-Back	(France)	Ismaïl Aaneba	29 May 1999 (age 27)	0	0	0	0	0	
54	Right-Back	(Hungary)	Norbert Kaján	11 September 2004 (age 22)	1+2	0+1	0	0+1	1+4	
99	Left-Back	(Ecuador)	Cristian Ramírez	12 August 1994 (age 32)	11+5	1+1	4	8+1	24+7	
Midfielders
5	Attacking Midfielder	(Guinea)	Naby Keïta^{*⊕}	10 February 1995 (age 31)	2+2	0	0	0	2+2	
7	Central Midfielder	(Tunisia)	Mohamed Ali Ben Romdhane	6 September 1999 (age 27)	12+6	2	1+1	3+7	18+14	
15	Central Midfielder	(Israel)	Mohammad Abu Fani	27 April 1998 (age 28)	13+5	1	1+3	12	27+8	
16	Attacking Midfielder	(Norway)	Kristoffer Zachariassen	27 January 1994 (age 32)	11+9	2+1	4	6+6	23+16	
25	Defensive Midfielder	(Latvia)	Cebrail Makreckis	10 May 2000 (age 26)	19+2	2	4	10+1	35+3	
64	Defensive Midfielder	(Hungary)	Alex Tóth	23 October 2005 (age 21)	7+1	2	0+1	1+3	10+5	
66	Defensive Midfielder	(Brazil)	Júlio Romão^{⊕}	29 March 1998 (age 28)	5	1	0	2	8	
70	Attacking Midfielder	(Ghana)	Isaac Pappoe	20 December 2003 (age 22)	0+4	1	0	0	1+4	
80	Defensive Midfielder	(Ivory Coast)	Habib Maïga	1 January 1996 (age 30)	13+5	0+1	3	6+4	22+10	
88	Attacking Midfielder	(Belgium)	Philippe Rommens	20 August 1997 (age 29)	11+5	0+1	4	7+3	22+9	
Forwards
8	Centre-Forward	(Serbia)	Aleksandar Pešić	21 May 1992 (age 34)	4+8	1	4	1+4	10+12	
11	Centre-Forward	(Brazil)	Matheus Saldanha^{⊕}	18 August 1999 (age 27)	7+9	0+3	0	5+5	12+17	
19	Centre-Forward	(Hungary)	Barnabás Varga	25 October 1994 (age 32)	16+4	2	0	9+1	27+5	
20	Right Winger	(Mali)	Adama Traoré	5 June 1995 (age 31)	14+8	1+1	4	10+2	29+11	
24	Left Winger	(Nigeria)	Tosin Kehinde	18 June 1998 (age 28)	8+10	2+1	2	0+1	12+12	
32	Left Winger	(Serbia)	Aleksandar Ćirković^{⊕}	21 September 2001 (age 25)	1+3	1	0	0	2+3	
75	Right Winger	(France)	Lenny Joseph^{⊕}	12 October 2000 (age 26)	0+5	0+1	0	0	0+6	
93	Left Winger	(Suriname)	Virgil Misidjan^{⊕}	24 July 1993 (age 33)	0+3	0+1	0	1+2	1+6	
	Left Winger	(Brazil)	Guilherme Henrique^{⊕}	26 December 2006 (age 19)	0	0	0	0	0	
	Centre-Forward	(Senegal)	Olelekan Ibrahim^{⊕}		0	0	0	0	0	
Players who departed the club on loan but featured this season
Players who left the club during the season
(4)	Centre-Back	(Netherlands)	Mats Knoester^{†}	19 November 1998 (age 27)	0	1	0+1	2	3+1	
(10)	FW	(Brazil)	Marquinhos^{†}	23 October 1999 (age 27)	0	0	1	0	1	
(10)	Attacking Midfielder	(Brazil)	Kady^{†}	2 May 1996 (age 30)	10+3	1	0+3	5+5	16+11	
(11)	FW	(Bosnia and Herzegovina)	Kenan Kodro^{†}	19 August 1993 (age 33)	0	0	0	0	0	
(14)	MF	(Bosnia and Herzegovina)	Amer Gojak^{†}	13 February 1997 (age 29)	0	0	0	0	0	
(18)	FW	(Ghana)	Owusu Kwabena^{†}	18 June 1997 (age 29)	1	0	0+1	0	1+1	
(21)	DF	(Hungary)	Endre Botka^{†}	25 August 1994 (age 32)	3+2	1	0+2	1+2	5+6	
(22)	DF	(Suriname)	Myenty Abena^{†}	12 December 1994 (age 31)	0	0	0+1	0	0+1	
(23)	Left-Back	(Hungary)	Lóránd Pászka^{†}	22 March 1996 (age 30)	3	1	0	0	4	
(30)	Centre-Forward	(Hungary)	Zsombor Gruber^{†}	7 September 2004 (age 22)	4+5	1	0+2	1+2	6+9	
(33)	MF	(Bosnia and Herzegovina)	Stjepan Lončar^{†}	10 November 1996 (age 30)	0	0	0	0	0	
(40)	FW	(Nigeria)	Fortune Bassey^{†}	6 October 1998 (age 28)	1+1	0	0+1	0	1+2	
(42)	MF	(Nigeria)	Anderson Esiti^{†}	24 May 1994 (age 32)	0	0	0	0	0	
(77)	MF	(Armenia)	Edgar Sevikyan^{†}	8 August 2001 (age 25)	0	0	0+1	0	0+1	

Notes: GK: goalkeeper; DF: defender; MF: midfielder; FW: forward

=== Goal scorers ===
Includes all competitions for senior teams. The list is sorted by the squad number when the season-total goals are equal. Players with no goals are not included in the list.
How many of the goals scored by the player from penalties is indicated in parentheses.

Rk.	No.	Pos.	Nat.	Player	Nemzeti Bajnokság I	Magyar Kupa	Champions League	Europa League	Season total
1	19	FW	(Hungary)	Barnabás Varga	9 (2)	2 (1)	0	7 (3)	18 (6)
2	11	MF	(Brazil)	Matheus Saldanha^{⊕}	7	2	0	1	10
3	20	FW	(Mali)	Adama Traoré	3	0	3	2	8
4	7	MF	(Tunisia)	Mohamed Ali Ben Romdhane	3 (1)	1	0	2	6 (1)
4	16	MF	(Norway)	Kristoffer Zachariassen	0	3	2	1	6
5	8	FW	(Serbia)	Aleksandar Pešić	4 (1)	0	0	0	4 (1)
5	15	MF	(Israel)	Mohammad Abu Fani	2	1	0	1	4
6	(10)	MF	(Brazil)	Kady^{†}	2 (1)	0	0	1	3 (1)
6	27	DF	(France)	Ibrahim Cissé	1	0	1	1	3
7	24	FW	(Nigeria)	Tosin Kehinde	2	0	0	0	2
7	34	DF	(Brazil)	Raul Gustavo	2	0	0	0	2
7	88	MF	(Belgium)	Philippe Rommens	1	0	1 (1)	0	2 (1)
8	3	DF	(Denmark)	Stefan Gartenmann^{⊕}	1	0	0	0	1
8	(10)	FW	(Brazil)	Marquinhos^{†}	0	0	1 (1)	0	1 (1)
8	25	MF	(Latvia)	Cebrail Makreckis	1	0	0	0	1
8	(30)	FW	(Hungary)	Zsombor Gruber^{†}	1	0	0	0	1
8	80	MF	(Ivory Coast)	Habib Maïga	1	0	0	0	1
				Opponent Own goal	0	0	0	1	1
Total					40 (5)	9 (1)	8 (2)	17 (3)	74 (11)

=== Penalties ===
Date	Penalty Taker	Scored	Opponent	Competition
23 July 2024	(Brazil) Marquinhos^{†}	Yes	The New Saints (H)	Champions League, Second Qualifying Round
30 July 2024	(Belgium) Philippe Rommens	Yes	The New Saints (A)	Champions League, Second Qualifying Round
10 August 2024	(Tunisia) Mohamed Ali Ben Romdhane	Yes	Diósgyőr (A)	Nemzeti Bajnokság I, Round 3
29 August 2024	(Hungary) Barnabás Varga	Yes	Borac Banja Luka (A)	Europa League, Play-off round
1 September 2024	(Hungary) Barnabás Varga	Yes	Nyíregyháza (H)	Nemzeti Bajnokság I, Round 6
20 October 2024	(Brazil) Kady^{†}	Yes	Fehérvár (H)	Nemzeti Bajnokság I, Round 10
28 November 2024	(Hungary) Barnabás Varga	Yes	Malmö (H)	Europa League, League phase, Matchday 5
5 December 2024	(Hungary) Barnabás Varga	Yes	Debrecen (A)	Nemzeti Bajnokság I, Round 1
30 January 2025	(Hungary) Barnabás Varga	Yes	AZ Alkmaar (H)	Europa League, League phase, Matchday 8
27 February 2025	(Hungary) Barnabás Varga	Yes	Győr (A)	Magyar Kupa, Round of 16
16 March 2025	(Serbia) Aleksandar Pešić	Yes	Kecskemét (H)	Nemzeti Bajnokság I, Round 24

=== Hat-tricks ===
Key
Score	The score is at the time of the goals.		
(H)	Ferencváros were the home team.	(A)	Ferencváros were the away team.

Pos.	Nat.	Player	Minutes	Score	Result	Opponent	Competition	Date
FW	(Mali)	Adama Traoré	15', 21', 54'	1–0, 2–0, 4–0	5–0 (H)	The New Saints	UEFA Champions League, Second qualifying round	23 July 2024
FW	(Brazil)	Matheus Saldanha	65', 77', 82'	1–0, 2–0, 3–0	3–0 (H)	Puskás Akadémia	Nemzeti Bajnokság I, Round 8	29 September 2024

=== Own goals ===
Key
Score	The score is at the time of the own goal.		
(H)	Ferencváros were the home team.	(A)	Ferencváros were the away team.

Pos.	Nat.	Player	Minute	Score	Result	Opponent	Competition	Date
MF	(Brazil)	Júlio Romão	54	3–3	4–3	Győr (A)	Magyar Kupa, Round of 16	27 February 2025

=== Goalkeppers ===
==== Clean sheets ====
Includes all competitions for senior teams. The list is sorted by the squad number when the season-total clean sheets are equal. the numbers in parentheses represent games where both goalkeepers participated and both kept a clean sheet; the number in parentheses is awarded to the goalkeeper who was substituted on, whilst a full clean sheet is awarded to the goalkeeper who was on the field at the start of play.
How many of the goals scored from penalties is indicated in parentheses.

Goalkeeper							Clean sheets				
Rk.	No.	Nat.	Goalkeeper	Games Played	Goals Against	Goals Against Average	Nemzeti Bajnokság I	Magyar Kupa	Champions League	Europa League	Season total
1	90	(Hungary)	Dénes Dibusz	32	31 (4)	0.97	11	1	1	3	16
2	1	(Hungary)	Ádám Varga	6	8	1.33	1	0	0	0	1
2	89	(Hungary)	Dávid Gróf	6	11 (2)	1.83	0	0	0	1	1
Total					50 (6)		12	1	1	4	18

Note: In Europa League, League phase, Matchday 7 (vs Eintracht Frankfurt) Dénes Dibusz was substituted off the (substituted off) 33' minute due to injury when the match score was 0–0, he did't playing until the end of the match, he was not given an cleen sheet, Ádám Varga (substituted on) 33'.

==== Penalties saving ====
Date	Goalkeeper	Penalty Kick Save	Penalty Taker	Opponent	Competition	Min.
20 September 2024	Dénes Dibusz	No	István Bognár	MTK	Nemzeti Bajnokság I, Round 7	(penalty scored) '18
25 September 2024	Dénes Dibusz	No	Kasper Dolberg	Anderlecht (Royal Belgian Football Association)	Europa League, League Phase, Matchday 1	(penalty scored) '66
28 November 2024	Dénes Dibusz	No	Erik Botheim	Malmö (Swedish Football Association)	Europa League, League Phase, Matchday 5	(penalty scored) '18
12 December 2024	Dénes Dibusz	No	Andrija Živković	PAOK (Hellenic Football Federation)	Europa League, League Phase, Matchday 6	(penalty scored) '80
23 February 2025	Dávid Gróf	No	Bálint Szabó	Fehérvár	Nemzeti Bajnokság I, Round 21	(penalty scored) '56
2 March 2025	Dávid Gróf	No	Nadhir Benbouali	Győr	Nemzeti Bajnokság I, Round 22	(penalty scored) '48

=== Disciplinary record ===
Includes all competitions for senior teams. The list is sorted by red cards, then yellow cards (and by squad number when total cards are equal). Players with no cards not included in the list.

Rk.	No.	Pos.	Nat.	Player	Nemzeti Bajnokság I				Magyar Kupa				Champions League				Europa League				Season total			
Rk.	No.	Pos.	Nat.	Player	Yellow card	Second yellow card	Red card	MM	Yellow card	Second yellow card	Red card	MM	Yellow card	Second yellow card	Red card	MM	Yellow card	Second yellow card	Red card	MM	Yellow card	Second yellow card	Red card	MM
1	15	MF	(Israel)	Mohammad Abu Fani	2	0	1	1	0	0	0	0	1	0	0	0	2	0	0	0	5	0	1	1
2	(10)	MF	(Brazil)	Kady^{†}	2	1	0	1	0	0	0	0	1	0	0	0	0	0	0	0	3	1	0	1
3	66	MF	(Brazil)	Júlio Romão^{⊕}	1	0	1	1	1	0	0	0	0	0	0	0	0	0	0	0	2	0	1	1
4	22	DF	(Hungary)	Gábor Szalai^{⊕}	1	0	1	1	0	0	0	0	0	0	0	0	0	0	0	0	1	0	1	1
4	34	DF	(Brazil)	Raul Gustavo	0	0	0	0	0	0	0	0	1	0	1	1	0	0	0	0	1	0	1	1
5	24	FW	(Nigeria)	Tosin Kehinde	0	0	1	1	0	0	0	0	0	0	0	0	0	0	0	0	0	0	1	1
6	19	FW	(Hungary)	Barnabás Varga	5	0	0	0	0	0	0	0	0	0	0	0	6	0	0	2	11	0	0	2
7	7	MF	(Tunisia)	Mohamed Ali Ben Romdhane	4	0	0	0	1	0	0	0	0	0	0	0	1	0	0	0	6	0	0	0
7	25	MF	(Latvia)	Cebrail Makreckis	4	0	0	0	0	0	0	0	0	0	0	0	2	0	0	0	6	0	0	0
8	16	MF	(Norway)	Kristoffer Zachariassen	1	0	0	0	0	0	0	0	1	0	0	0	2	0	0	0	4	0	0	0
8	(21)	DF	(Hungary)	Endre Botka^{†}	2	0	0	0	0	0	0	0	1	0	0	0	1	0	0	0	4	0	0	0
8	80	MF	(Ivory Coast)	Habib Maïga	3	0	0	0	0	0	0	0	0	0	0	0	1	0	0	0	4	0	0	0
9	3	DF	(Denmark)	Stefan Gartenmann^{⊕}	3	0	0	0	0	0	0	0	0	0	0	0	0	0	0	0	3	0	0	0
9	11	FW	(Brazil)	Matheus Saldanha^{⊕}	0	0	0	0	0	0	0	0	0	0	0	0	3	0	0	0	3	0	0	0
9	17	DF	(Bosnia and Herzegovina)	Eldar Ćivić	1	0	0	0	0	0	0	0	0	0	0	0	2	0	0	0	3	0	0	0
9	64	MF	(Hungary)	Alex Tóth	1	0	0	0	2	0	0	0	0	0	0	0	0	0	0	0	3	0	0	0
9	99	DF	(Ecuador)	Cristian Ramírez	1	0	0	0	0	0	0	0	1	0	0	0	1	0	0	0	3	0	0	0
10	8	FW	(Serbia)	Aleksandar Pešić	2	0	0	0	0	0	0	0	0	0	0	0	0	0	0	0	2	0	0	0
10	20	FW	(Mali)	Adama Traoré	1	0	0	0	0	0	0	0	0	0	0	0	1	0	0	0	2	0	0	0
10	27	DF	(France)	Ibrahim Cissé	0	0	0	0	0	0	0	0	1	0	0	0	1	0	0	0	2	0	0	0
10	88	MF	(Belgium)	Philippe Rommens	0	0	0	0	0	0	0	0	1	0	0	0	1	0	0	0	2	0	0	0
10	90	GK	(Hungary)	Dénes Dibusz	2	0	0	0	0	0	0	0	0	0	0	0	0	0	0	0	2	0	0	0
10	93	FW	(Suriname)	Virgil Misidjan^{⊕}	0	0	0	0	0	0	0	0	0	0	0	0	2	0	0	0	2	0	0	0
11	(4)	DF	(Netherlands)	Mats Knoester^{†}	0	0	0	0	0	0	0	0	0	0	0	0	1	0	0	0	1	0	0	0
11	(10)	FW	(Brazil)	Marquinhos^{†}	0	0	0	0	0	0	0	0	1	0	0	0	0	0	0	0	1	0	0	0
11	(30)	FW	(Hungary)	Zsombor Gruber^{†}	0	0	0	0	0	0	0	0	0	0	0	0	1	0	0	0	1	0	0	0
11	32	FW	(Serbia)	Aleksandar Ćirković^{⊕}	1	0	0	0	0	0	0	0	0	0	0	0	0	0	0	0	1	0	0	0
11	75	FW	(France)	Lenny Joseph^{⊕}	1	0	0	0	0	0	0	0	0	0	0	0	0	0	0	0	1	0	0	0
Total					38	1	4	5	4	0	0	0	9	0	1	1	28	0	0	2	79	1	5	8

=== Suspensions ===
Player	Date Received	Offence	Competition	Length of suspension			
(Israel) Mohammad Abu Fani	17 August 2024	(red card) 90+12' vs Újpest (H)	Nemzeti Bajnokság I, Round 4	1 Match	Nyíregyháza (H)	Nemzeti Bajnokság I, Round 6	1 September 2024
(Brazil) Raul Gustavo	13 August 2024	(red card) 90+6' vs Midtjylland (H)	Champions League, Third qualifying round	1 Match	—		
(Nigeria) Tosin Kehinde	20 October 2024	(red card) 62' vs Fehérvár (H)	Nemzeti Bajnokság I, Round 10	1 Match	Győr (H)	Nemzeti Bajnokság I, Round 11	27 October 2024
(Brazil) Kady Borges	10 November 2024	(yellow card) 35' (yellow-red card) 63' vs Kecskemét (A)	Nemzeti Bajnokság I, Round 13	1 Match	Diósgyőr (H)	Nemzeti Bajnokság I, Round 14	24 November 2024
(Hungary) Barnabás Varga	28 November 2024	3rd (yellow card) after Malmö (H)	Europa League, League phase, Matchday 5	1 Match	PAOK (A)	Europa League, League phase, Matchday 6	12 December 2024
(Hungary) Gábor Szalai^{⊕}	5 December 2024	(yellow card) 4' (yellow-red card) 31' vs Debrecen (A)	Nemzeti Bajnokság I, Round 1	1 Match	Zalaegerszeg (H)	Nemzeti Bajnokság I, Round 16	8 December 2024
(Hungary) Barnabás Varga	13 February 2025	2nd (yellow card) after Viktoria Plzeň (H)	Europa League, Knockout phase, Play-off, First leg	1 Match	Viktoria Plzeň (A)	Europa League, Knockout phase, Play-off, Second leg	20 February 2025
(Brazil) Júlio Romão^{⊕}	9 March 2025	(yellow card) 78' (yellow-red card) 90+4' vs Debrecen (A)	Nemzeti Bajnokság I, Round 23	1 Match	Kecskemét (H)	Nemzeti Bajnokság I, Round 24	16 March 2025

=== Injuries ===
Player	Last game before suffering an injury			First game after recovering from an injury			GM	Ref.
Player	Date	Competition	Offence	Date	Competition	Offence	GM	Ref.
(Latvia) Cebrail Makreckis	20 September 2024	Nemzeti Bajnokság I, Round 7 (substituted off) 76'	MTK (A)	3 October 2024	Europa League, League phase, Matchday 2	Tottenham Hotspur (H)	1	
(Brazil) Raul Gustavo	3 October 2024	Europa League, League phase, Matchday 2 (substituted off) 90+4'	Tottenham Hotspur (H)	12 December 2024	Europa League, League phase, Matchday 6	PAOK (A)	11	
(Hungary) Dénes Dibusz	23 January 2025	Europa League, League phase, Matchday 7 (substituted off) 33'	Eintracht Frankfurt (A)	9 March 2025	Nemzeti Bajnokság I, Round 23	Debrecen (A)	9	

=== Captains ===
Includes all competitions for senior teams. The list is sorted by squad number when season-total number of games where a player started as captain are equal. Players with no games started as captain not included in the list.

Rk.	No.	Pos.	Nat.	Player	Nemzeti Bajnokság I	Magyar Kupa	Champions League	Europa League	Season total
1	90	GK	(Hungary)	Dénes Dibusz	26	3	4	9	42
2	19	FW	(Hungary)	Barnabás Varga	3	2	0	2	7
3	27	DF	(France)	Ibrahim Cissé	3	0	0	1	4
Total					32	5	4	12	53

=== Number of players by country ===
Number	Country	Player(s)
9	(Hungarian Football Federation) Hungary	(1) Á. Varga, (19) B. Varga, (22) Szalai, (29) G. Szécsi, (54) Kaján, (63) Radnóti, (64) A. Tóth, (90) Dibusz, (89) Gróf
4	Brazil	(11) Saldanha, (34) Gustavo, (66) Romão, Henrique
3	France	(27) Cissé, (44) Aaneba, (75) Joseph
3	Ghana	(18) Kwabena, (70) Pappoe, (75) Shadirac
2	Serbia	(8) Pešić, (32) Ćirković
1	Belgium	(88) Rommens
1	Bosnia and Herzegovina	(17) Ćivić
1	Denmark	(3) Gartenmann
1	Ecuador	(99) Ramírez
1	Guinea	(5) Keïta
1	Israel	(15) Abu Fani
1	Ivory Coast	(80) Maïga
1	Latvia	(25) Makreckis
1	Mali	(20) Traoré
1	Nigeria	(24) Kehinde
1	Norway	(15) Zachariassen
1	Senegal	Ibrahim
1	Suriname	(93) Misidjan
1	Tunisia	(7) Ben Romdhane

== Managerial statistics ==
As of match played 24 May 2025

Managerial record by manager and tenure
Manager	From	To	Season total								Nemzeti Bajnokság I								Magyar Kupa								UEFA Champions League								UEFA Europa League							
Manager	From	To	G	W	D	L	GF	GA	GD	W%	G	W	D	L	GF	GA	GD	W%	G	W	D	L	GF	GA	GD	W%	G	W	D	L	GF	GA	GD	W%	G	W	D	L	GF	GA	GD	W%
Pascal Jansen	13 Jun. 2024	31 Dec. 2024	30	17	7	6	53	32	+21	56.67%	16	10	4	2	28	16	+12	62.50%	2	2	0	0	5	1	+4	100.00%	4	2	1	1	8	4	+4	50.00%	8	3	2	3	12	11	+1	37.50%
Robbie Keane	6 Jan. 2025	present	25	15	6	4	52	29	+23	60.00%	17	10	5	2	36	15	+21	58.82%	4	3	1	0	11	6	+5	75.00%	—	—	—	—	—	—	—	—	4	2	0	2	5	8	-3	50.00%
Total			55	32	13	10	105	61	+44	58.18%	33	20	9	4	64	31	+33	60.60%	6	5	1	0	16	7	+9	83.33%	4	2	1	1	8	4	+4	50.00%	12	5	2	5	17	19	-2	41.67%

• Nemzeti Bajnokság I: Domestic league;
• Magyar Kupa: Domestic cup;

== Attendances ==
The table contains the number of attendances of Ferencvárosi TC domestic matches.
Clicking on the competitions leads to the number of spectators for all the matches of the competitions.
The gold indicates the highest attendances, and the lowest attendances with pink .
Home stadium: Groupama Arena, Budapest • Capacity: 23,700 (22,122 in international matches)

League	Matches	Attendances	Average		High		Low	
League	Matches	Attendances	Att.	%	Att.	%	Att.	%
Nemzeti Bajnokság I	16	179,774	11,236	47.4%	19,021	80.2%	6,695	28.2%
Magyar Kupa	1	11,057	11,057	46.7%	11,057	46.7%	11,057	46.7%
UEFA Champions League	2	34,258	17,129	77.4%	18,027	81.5%	16,231	73.4%
UEFA Europa League	6	108,400	18,067	81.7%	20,795	94.0%	13,167	59.5%
Total	25	333,489	13,340	60.3%	20,795	94.0%	6,695	28.2%

• Nemzeti Bajnokság I: Domestic league;
• Magyar Kupa: Domestic cup;

Nemzeti Bajnokság I
Round	Date	Opponent	Attendances	%	Ref.
Round 2	3 August 2024	Kecskemét	9,977	42.1%	
Round 4	17 August 2024	Újpest	18,751	79.1%	
Round 6	1 September 2024	Nyíregyháza	8,175	34.5%	
Round 8	29 September 2024	Puskás Akadémia	11,767	49.6%	
Round 10	20 October 2024	Fehérvár	11,105	46.8%	
Round 12	3 November 2024	Debrecen	11,375	48.0%	
Round 14	24 November 2024	Diósgyőr	8,723	36.8%	
Round 16	8 December 2024	Zalaegerszeg	6,897	29.1%	
Round 18	2 February 2025	MTK	6,695	28.2%	
Round 20	16 February 2025	Paks	7,129	30.1%	
Round 22	2 March 2025	Győr	8,773	37.0%	
Round 24	16 March 2025	Kecskemét	10,107	42.6%	
Round 26	6 April 2025	Újpest	18,557	79.2%	
Round 28	20 April 2025	Nyíregyháza	10,765	45.4%	
Round 30	3 May 2025	Puskás Akadémia	19,021	80.3%	
Round 32	18 May 2025	Fehérvár	11,957	50.4%	
Total			179,774	—	
Average			11,236	47.4%	

Magyar Kupa
Round	Date	Opponent	Attendances	%	Ref.
Semi-final	23 April 2025	MTK	11,057	46.7%	
Total			11,057	—	
Average			11,057	46.7	

UEFA Champions League
Round	Date	Opponent	Attendances	%	Ref.
Qualifying, Round 2	23 July 2024	(Football Association of Wales) The New Saints	16,231	73.4%	
Qualifying, Round 3	13 August 2024	(Danish Football Association) Midtjylland	18,027	81.5%	
Total			34,258	—	
Average			17,129	77.4%	

UEFA Europa League
Round	Date	Opponent	Attendances	%	Ref.
Play-off for League Phase	22 August 2024	(Football Association of Bosnia and Herzegovina) Borac Banja Luka	13,167	59.5%	
League Phase, Matchday 2	3 October 2024	(The Football Association) Tottenham Hotspur	20,795	94.0%	
League Phase, Matchday 3	25 October 2024	(French Football Federation) OGC Nice	18,371	94.0%	
League Phase, Matchday 5	28 November 2024	(Swedish Football Association) Malmö	18,891	85.4%	
League Phase, Matchday 8	30 January 2025	(Royal Dutch Football Association) AZ Alkmaar	18,657	84.3%	
Knockout Phase, Play-off, First leg	13 February 2025	(Football Association of the Czech Republic) Viktoria Plzeň	18.519	83.7%	
Total			108,400	—	
Average			18,067	81.7%	

== Awards and nominations ==
Keys
M	Matches	W	Won	D	Drawn	L	Lost
Pts	Points	GF	Goals for	GA	Goals against	GD	Goal difference
Pos.	Position	Pld	Played	G	Goals	A	Assists
(H)	Ferencvárosi TC were the home team.			(A)	Ferencvárosi TC were the away team.		
Player	Young Hungarian Player, who is a Hungarian player and was born 2004 or after						
Player^{*}	Player who joined Ferencvárosi TC permanently or on loan during the season						
Player^{†}	Player who departed Ferencvárosi TC permanently or on loan during the season						

=== Weekly awards ===
==== Player of the Round ====
Selection of the Round of Nemzeti Bajnokság by M4 Sport TV, Nemzeti Sport, Csakfoci and Sofascore websites and Player of the Week (POW) by Nemzeti Sport.

Round	Opponent	Pos.	Player	Selection of the Round				POW	Ref.
Round	Opponent	Pos.	Player	Nemzeti Sport	M4 Sport TV	Csakfoci	Sofascore	POW	Ref.
Round 2	Kecskemét (H)	FW	(Mali) Adama Traoré				Yes		
Round 3	Diósgyőr (A)	DF	(Brazil) Raul Gustavo			Yes	Yes		
Round 3	Diósgyőr (A)	MF	(Tunisia) Mohamed Ali Ben Romdhane			Yes	Yes		
Round 3	Diósgyőr (A)	MF	(Israel) Mohammad Abu Fani				Yes		
Round 4	Újpest (H)	FW	(Hungary) Zsombor Gruber			Yes			
Round 4	Újpest (H)	MF	(Latvia) Cebrail Makreckis				Yes		
Round 6	Nyíregyháza (H)	DF	(Denmark) Stefan Gartenmann		Yes	Yes	Yes		
Round 6	Nyíregyháza (H)	GK	(Hungary) Dénes Dibusz			Yes			
Round 7	MTK (A)	DF	(Brazil) Raul Gustavo		Yes		Yes		
Round 7	MTK (A)	FW	(Brazil) Matheus Saldanha			Yes			
Round 7	MTK (A)	FW	(Hungary) Barnabás Varga		Yes	Yes			
Round 8	Puskás Akadémia (H)	DF	(Bosnia and Herzegovina) Eldar Ćivić				Yes		
Round 8	Puskás Akadémia (H)	FW	(Brazil) Matheus Saldanha		Yes	Yes	Yes		
Round 8	Puskás Akadémia (H)	FW	(Nigeria) Tosin Kehinde		Yes				
Round 9	Paks (A)	FW	(Brazil) Kady Borges				Yes		
Round 10	Fehérvár (H)	FW	(Brazil) Kady Borges		Yes				
Round 12	Debrecen (H)	MF	(Latvia) Cebrail Makreckis			Yes			
Round 12	Debrecen (H)	FW	(Mali) Adama Traoré				Yes		
Round 13	Kecskemét (A)	FW	(Nigeria) Tosin Kehinde (s)			Yes			
Round 14	Diósgyőr (H)	MF	(Israel) Mohammad Abu Fani			Yes	Yes		
Round 15	Újpest (A)	DF	(Denmark) Stefan Gartenmann			Yes			
Round 1	Debrecen (A)	FW	(Hungary) Barnabás Varga			Yes			
Round 16	Zalaegerszeg (H)	DF	(France) Ibrahim Cissé			Yes			
Round 17	Nyíregyháza (A)	GK	(Hungary) Dénes Dibusz			Yes	Yes		
Round 17	Nyíregyháza (A)	FW	(Hungary) Barnabás Varga			Yes			
Round 18	MTK (H)	MF	(Belgium) Philippe Rommens				Yes		
Round 5	Zalaegerszeg (A)	MF	(Tunisia) Mohamed Ali Ben Romdhane				Yes		
Round 5	Zalaegerszeg (A)	FW	(Hungary) Barnabás Varga				Yes		
Round 19	Puskás Akadémia (A)	MF	(Israel) Mohammad Abu Fani		Yes		Yes		
Round 20	Paks (H)	DF	(Denmark) Stefan Gartenmann				Yes		
Round 21	Fehérvár (A)	DF	(France) Ibrahim Cissé		Yes		Yes		
Round 21	Fehérvár (A)	MF	(Israel) Mohammad Abu Fani		Yes	Yes			
Round 21	Fehérvár (A)	MF	(Hungary) Alex Tóth			Yes			
Round 22	Győr (H)	MF	(Hungary) Alex Tóth		Yes	Yes			
Round 22	Győr (H)	FW	(Serbia) Aleksandar Pešić (s)			Yes			
Round 23	Debrecen (A)	DF	(Denmark) Stefan Gartenmann		Yes		Yes		
Round 23	Debrecen (A)	MF	(Latvia) Cebrail Makreckis			Yes			
Round 23	Debrecen (A)	FW	(Brazil) Matheus Saldanha			Yes			
Round 24	Kecskemét (H)	DF	(Brazil) Raul Gustavo		Yes		Yes		
Round 24	Kecskemét (H)	MF	(Ivory Coast) Habib Maïga		Yes	Yes	Yes		
Round 24	Kecskemét (H)	MF	(Hungary) Alex Tóth			Yes			
Round 24	Kecskemét (H)	FW	(Serbia) Aleksandar Pešić		Yes	Yes			

(s) Substitute

==== Goal of the Round ====
Goal of the Round of Nemzeti Bajnokság by the M4 Sport website.

Keys

- Score – The score at the time of the goal. Ferencvárosi TC's score listed first.
- Final score – The score at full time; Ferencvárosi TC's listed first.

Round	Pos.	Player	Placement	Score	Final score	Opponent	Date	Ref.

=== Monthly awards ===
==== Player of the Month ====
Player of the Month by Ferencvárosi TC (Sponsored: HSA Group).

Month	Pos.	Player	Ref.
July	FW	(Mali) Adama Traoré	
August	GK	(Hungary) Dénes Dibusz	
September	FW	(Brazil) Matheus Saldanha	
October	GK	(Hungary) Dénes Dibusz	
November	FW	(Hungary) Barnabás Varga	
December	FW	(Hungary) Barnabás Varga	
January	MF	(Tunisia) Mohamed Ali Ben Romdhane	
February	MF	(Hungary) Alex Tóth	
March	GK	(Hungary) Dénes Dibusz	
April	FW	(Serbia) Aleksandar Pešić	

=== Yearly awards ===
==== Rangadó Award Ceremony (Rangadó Gála) ====
Award	Manager or Player	Result	Ref.
2025 Rookie of the Year	(Hungary) Alex Tóth	Won	

==== HLSZ Cup ====
Award	Manager or Player	Result	Ref.
2024 Best Player of the Year	(Hungary) Barnabás Varga	Won	
2024 Best Player of the Year	(Israel) Mohammad Abu Fani	Nominated	
2024 Best Goalkeeper of the Year	(Hungary) Dénes Dibusz	Won	
2024 Best U21 Player of the Year	(Hungary) Krisztián Lisztes	Nominated	
2024 Best Coach of the Year	(Serbia) Dejan Stanković	Nominated	

== Milestones ==
Keys
Final score	The score at full time; Ferencvárosi TC's listed first.	No.	Squad number	Pos.	Position
Opponent	The opponent team without a flag is Hungarian.	(N)	The game was played at a neutral site.		
(H)	Ferencvárosi TC were the home team.	(A)	Ferencvárosi TC were the away team.		
Player^{*}	Player who joined Ferencvárosi TC permanently or on loan during the season				
Player^{†}	Player who departed Ferencvárosi TC permanently or on loan during the season				

Debuts

The following players made their competitive debuts for Ferencvárosi TC's first team during the campaign.

Date	No.	Pos.	Player	Age	Final score	Opponent	Competition	Ref.
3 August 2024	88	MF	(Belgium) Philippe Rommens	26	1–0	Kecskemét (H)	Nemzeti Bajnokság, Round 2	
3 August 2024	10	MF	(Brazil) Kady Borges	28	1–0	Kecskemét (H)	Nemzeti Bajnokság, Round 2	
3 August 2024	34	DF	(Brazil) Raul Gustavo	25	1–0	Kecskemét (H)	Nemzeti Bajnokság, Round 2	
10 August 2024	70	MF	(Ghana) Isaac Pappoe	20	2–0	Diósgyőr (A)	Nemzeti Bajnokság, Round 3	
22 August 2024	93	FW	(Suriname) Virgil Misidjan	31	0–0	Borac Banja Luka (H)	Europa League, Play-off round	
1 September 2024	3	DF	(Denmark) Stefan Gartenmann	27	2–1	Nyíregyháza (H)	Nemzeti Bajnokság, Round 6	
15 September 2024	11	FW	(Brazil) Matheus Saldanha	25	3–0	Budafok (A)	Magyar Kupa, Round of 64	
15 September 2024	22	DF	(Hungary) Gábor Szalai	24	3–0	Budafok (A)	Magyar Kupa, Round of 64	
15 September 2024	54	DF	(Hungary) Norbert Kaján	20	3–0	Budafok (A)	Magyar Kupa, Round of 64	
2 February 2025	75	FW	(France) Lenny Joseph	24	0–0	MTK (H)	Nemzeti Bajnokság, Round 18	
9 February 2025	32	FW	(Serbia) Aleksandar Ćirković	23	0–1	Puskás Akadémia (A)	Nemzeti Bajnokság, Round 19	
9 February 2025	66	MF	(Brazil) Júlio Romão	26	0–1	Puskás Akadémia (A)	Nemzeti Bajnokság, Round 19	
13 February 2025	89	GK	(Hungary) Dávid Gróf	35	1–0	Viktoria Plzeň (H)	Europa League, Knockout phase, Play-off, First leg	
23 February 2025	5	MF	(Guinea) Naby Keïta^{*}	30	3–1	Fehérvár (A)	Nemzeti Bajnokság, Round 21	
20 April 2025	72	MF	(Hungary) Ádám Madarász	18	7–0	Nyíregyháza (H)	Nemzeti Bajnokság, Round 28	

50th appearances

The following players made their 50th appearances for Ferencvárosi TC's first team during the campaign.

Date	No.	Pos.	Player	Age	Final score	Opponent	Competition	Ref.
2 March 2025	25	MF	(Latvia) Cebrail Makreckis	24	2–2	Győr (H)	Nemzeti Bajnokság, Round 22	

100th appearances

The following players made their 100th appearances in the Nemzeti Bajnokság (Hungarian domestic league).

Date	No.	Pos.	Player	Age	Final score	Opponent	Competition	Ref.
5 February 2025	19	FW	(Hungary) Barnabás Varga	30	1–1	Zalaegerszeg (A)	Nemzeti Bajnokság, Round 5	

500th appearances

The following players made their 500th appearances for Ferencvárosi TC's first team during the campaign.

Date	No.	Pos.	Player	Age	Final score	Opponent	Competition	Ref.
30 March 2025	90	GK	(Hungary) Dénes Dibusz	34	1–1	Diósgyőr (A)	Nemzeti Bajnokság, Round 25	

First goals

The following players scored their first goals for Ferencvárosi TC's first team during the campaign.

Keys

- Score – The score at the time of the goal. Ferencvárosi TC's score listed first.
- Final score – The score at full time; Ferencvárosi TC's listed first.

Date	No.	Pos.	Player	Age	Score	Final score	Opponent	Competition	Ref.
17 August 2024	24	FW	(Nigeria) Tosin Kehinde	26	1–0	1–0	Újpest (H)	Nemzeti Bajnokság, Round 4	
1 September 2024	3	DF	(Denmark) Stefan Gartenmann	27	1–0	2–1	Nyíregyháza (H)	Nemzeti Bajnokság, Round 6	
15 September 2024	11	FW	(Brazil) Matheus Saldanha	25	1–0	3–0	Budafok (A)	Magyar Kupa, Round of 64	
20 September 2024	34	DF	(Brazil) Raul Gustavo	25	2–1	3–1	MTK (A)	Nemzeti Bajnokság, Round 7	
3 November 2024	30	FW	(Hungary) Zsombor Gruber	20	2–2	2–2	Debrecen (H)	Nemzeti Bajnokság, Round 12	
20 April 2025	64	MF	(Hungary) Alex Tóth	19	5–0	7–0	Nyíregyháza (H)	Nemzeti Bajnokság, Round 28	

== See also ==
- Ferencvárosi TC in European football
- Ferencvárosi TC–Újpest FC rivalry: local derby between Ferencváros and Újpest
- Örökrangadó: local derby between Ferencváros and MTK Budapest
