= Isaac Pappoe =

Ghanaian footballer (born 2003)

Personal information
- Date of birth: 20 December 2003 (age 22)
- Place of birth: Ghana
- Height: 1.80 m (5 ft 11 in)
- Position: Midfielder

Team information
- Current team: Dundee United FC
- Number: 70

Youth career
- Mighty Victory SC

Senior career*
Years	Team	Apps	(Gls)
–2022	Golden Kick SC		
2022–2024	FC Ashdod	1	(0)
2022–2023	→ Hapoel Ashdod FC (loan)	30	(1)
2023–2024	→ FC Aarau (loan)	28	(2)
2024–	Ferencvárosi TC	4	(0)
2025–2026	→ Dundee United FC (loan)	1	(0)

International career^{‡}
2022	Ghana U20	2	(0)
- * Club domestic league appearances and goals as of 29 December 2025 ‡ National team caps and goals as of 8 June 2022

Isaac Pappoe (born 20 December 2003) is a Ghanaian professional footballer who plays as a midfielder for Ferencváros.

== Club career ==
As a youth player, Pappoe joined the youth academy of Ghanaian side Mighty Victory SC. Following his stint there, he started his career with Ghanaian side Golden Kick SC. In 2022, he signed for Israeli side FC Ashdod at the age of eighteen, where he made one league appearance. The same year, he was sent on loan to Israeli side Hapoel Ashdod FC, where he made thirty league appearances and scored one goal and suffered relegation from the second tier to the third tier.

During the summer of 2023, he was sent on loan to Swiss side FC Aarau, where he made twenty-eight league appearances and scored two goals. Swiss newspaper Aargauer Zeitung wrote in 2024 that he was "the most valuable jewel in FC Aarau's roster" while playing for the club. Ahead of the 2024–25 season, he signed for Hungarian side Ferencvárosi TC. One year later, he was sent on loan to Scottish side Dundee United FC. Following an injury in a Conference League qualifying match against Rapid Wien in August, he didn't play again for the Scottish side and returned to his parent club the following summer.

== International career ==
Pappoe is a Ghana youth international. On 30 May 2022, he debuted for the Ghana national under-20 football team during a 1–0 away friendly win over the Mexico national under-20 football team.
