= Norbert Kaján =

Hungarian footballer

Personal information
- Full name: Norbert Gábor Kaján
- Date of birth: 11 September 2004 (age 22)
- Place of birth: Budapest, Hungary
- Height: 1.79 m (5 ft 10 in)
- Position: Right-back

Team information
- Current team: Ferencváros
- Number: 54

Youth career
- 2009–2023: Ferencváros

Senior career*
| Years | Team | Apps | (Gls) |
| 2021– | Ferencváros II | 50 | (2) |
| 2022– | Ferencváros | 8 | (0) |
| 2023–2025 | → Soroksár (loan) | 43 | (2) |
| 2025–2026 | → FK Csíkszereda (loan) | 1 | (0) |

International career^{‡}
| 2021 | Hungary U18 | 1 | (0) |
| 2022 | Hungary U19 | 2 | (0) |
| 2024– | Hungary U21 | 4 | (0) |
- * Club domestic league appearances and goals as of 3 November 2025 ‡ National team caps and goals as of 24 March 2025

Norbert Gábor Kaján (born 11 September 2004) is a Hungarian professional footballer who plays as a right-back for Nemzeti Bajnokság I club Ferencváros.

== Career ==
Norbert Kaján joined Ferencváros in 2009, at the age of five, and progressed through all the youth teams. In the 2022–23 season, he was a key player for the reserve team, and was given his first-team debut at the end of the season. Stanislav Cherchesov, then head coach of Ferencváros, brought him on as a substitute in an away defeat against Debrecen. A week later, in the league’s final match, he was in the starting line-up against Mezőkövesd Zsóry.

Following his debut, Kaján was invited to the club's summer training camp to help him integrate into the first team. According to him, Dávid Sigér and Anderson Esiti helped him and his teammates the most.

During the 2023–24 season, Kaján was loaned to Soroksár, Ferencváros’ partner team in the Nemzeti Bajnokság II. Under the terms of his contract, he was able to play both for Soroksár and Ferencváros, which allowed him to make an appearance in a UEFA Europa League match for Ferencváros on 7 November 2024, managed by Pascal Jansen, against Dynamo Kyiv.

On 9 May 2026, he won the 2025–26 Magyar Kupa with Ferencváros, beating Zalaegerszegi TE 1–0 in the final at Puskás Aréna.

== Personal life ==
His sister, Zsanett Kaján, is a Hungarian international footballer who was also developed at Ferencváros. His father was also a footballer, playing for Ganz-Mávag.

== Honours ==
Ferencváros

- Nemzeti Bajnokság I: 2022–23, 2024–25
- Magyar Kupa runner-up: 2024–25
