= Tosin Kehinde =

Nigerian footballer

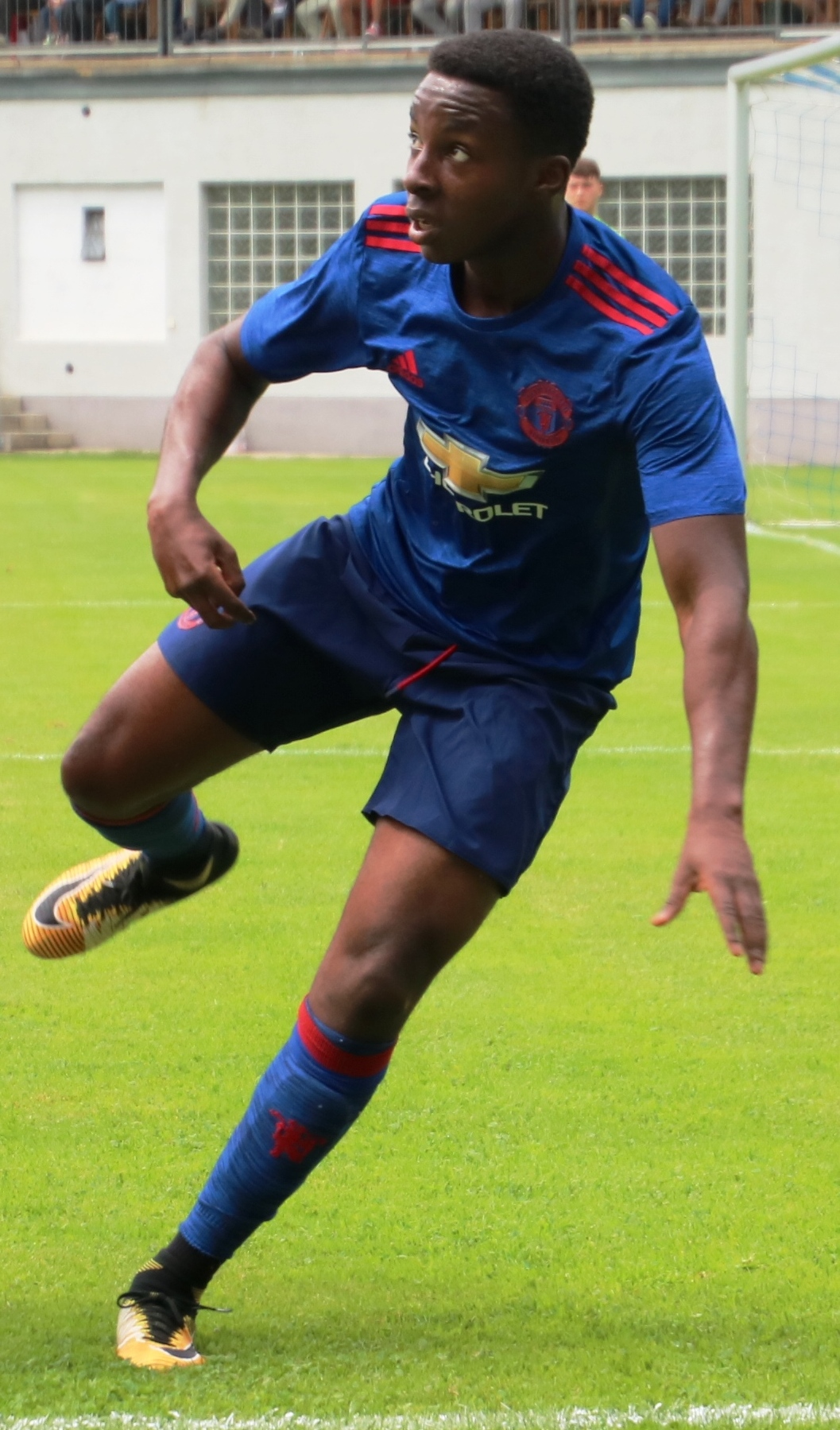
- Kehinde playing for Manchester United against FC Liefering on 11 July 2017.

Personal information
- Date of birth: 18 June 1998 (age 28)
- Place of birth: Lagos, Nigeria
- Height: 1.78 m (5 ft 10 in)
- Position: Winger

Team information
- Current team: Bandırmaspor
- Number: 11

Youth career
- 2011–2018: Manchester United
- 2018–2019: Feirense

Senior career*
Years	Team	Apps	(Gls)
2019–2020	Feirense	0	(0)
2019–2020	→ Randers (loan)	20	(1)
2020–2023	Randers	97	(9)
2023–2025	Ferencváros	23	(2)
2025–	Bandırmaspor	18	(2)
- * Club domestic league appearances and goals as of 5 May 2026

Tosin Kehinde (born 18 June 1998) is a Nigerian professional footballer who plays for Turkish TFF 1. Lig club Bandırmaspor as a winger.

== Early and personal life ==
Kehinde was born in Lagos, Nigeria and grew up in the United Kingdom.

== Club career ==
Kehinde joined the Manchester United Academy at the age of 13. His contract expired in June 2018, and he was linked with a transfer to a number of clubs across Europe as well as in England.

He was offered a new contract by Manchester United, but signed for Portuguese club Feirense in August 2018. He moved on loan to Danish club Randers FC in July 2019. He made his debut against OB. On 24 August 2020 Randers FC confirmed that Kehinde had signed permanently on a deal until June 2023.

On 7 June 2023 Kehinde signed for Hungarian club Ferencváros. He won the 2023–24 league championship with the club.

== International career ==
Kehinde is eligible to represent either Nigeria or England at international level, and in March 2018 he announced his intention to represent Nigeria.

== Honours ==
Randers

- Danish Cup: 2020–21
