= Ibrahim Cissé (footballer, born 1996) =

French footballer

Personal information
- Date of birth: 2 May 1996 (age 30)
- Place of birth: Paris, France
- Height: 1.85 m (6 ft 1 in)
- Position: Centre-back

Youth career
- 2003–2011: Les Lilas
- 2011–2012: Paris Saint-Germain
- 2012–2014: Tours

Senior career*
Years	Team	Apps	(Gls)
2014–2016	Tours II	45	(2)
2014–2018	Tours	61	(0)
2018–2020	Angers II	11	(0)
2018–2020	Angers	1	(0)
2020	→ Paris FC (loan)	7	(0)
2020–2021	Dunkerque	34	(0)
2021–2023	Caen	55	(0)
2023–2026	Ferencváros	71	(1)
- * Club domestic league appearances and goals as of 1 July 2026

Ibrahim Cissé (born 2 May 1996) is a French professional footballer who plays as a centre-back.

== Career ==
=== Tours ===
Born in Paris, Cissé began his career at Tours. He made his professional debut on 6 October 2014 in a Ligue 2 match against Brest. He started the game and played the full 90 minutes in a 2–0 away loss.

=== Angers ===
On 12 July 2018, Cissé signed with Ligue 1 side Angers.

=== Caen ===
On 1 September 2021, he joined Caen on a two-year contract.

=== Ferencváros ===
On 13 June 2023, he joined Ferencváros.

On 20 April 2024, the Ferencváros–Kisvárda tie ended with a goalless draw at the Groupama Aréna on the 29th match day of the 2023–24 Nemzeti Bajnokság I season which meant that Ferencváros won their 35th championship.

On 15 May 2024, Ferencváros were defeated by Paks 2–0 in the 2024 Magyar Kupa Final at the Puskás Aréna. On 9 May 2026, he won the 2025–26 Magyar Kupa season with Ferencváros by beating Zalaegerszegi TE 1–0 in the 2026 Magyar Kupa final at Puskás Aréna.

== Personal life ==
Cissé was born in France and is of Senegalese descent.

== Career statistics ==
As of 14 May 2022

Appearances and goals by club, season and competition
Club	Season	League			National cup		League cup		Total	
Club	Season	Division	Apps	Goals	Apps	Goals	Apps	Goals	Apps	Goals
Tours	2014–15	Ligue 2	4	0	2	0	0	0	6	0
Tours	2015–16	Ligue 2	3	0	0	0	0	0	3	0
Tours	2016–17	Ligue 2	33	0	1	0	0	0	34	0
Tours	2017–18	Ligue 2	21	0	0	0	4	0	25	0
Tours	Total		61	0	3	0	4	0	68	0
Angers	2018–19	Ligue 1	0	0	0	0	0	0	0	0
Angers	2019–20	Ligue 1	1	0	0	0	1	0	2	0
Angers	Total		1	0	0	0	1	0	2	0
Paris FC (loan)	2019–20	Ligue 2	7	0	1	0	0	0	8	0
Dunkerque	2020–21	Ligue 2	32	0	0	0	0	0	32	0
Dunkerque	2021–22	Ligue 2	2	0	0	0	0	0	2	0
Dunkerque	Total		34	0	0	0	0	0	34	0
Caen	2021-22	Ligue 2	24	0	1	0	0	0	25	0
Career total			127	0	5	0	5	0	137	0

== Honours ==
Ferencváros

- Nemzeti Bajnokság I champion: (2) 2023–24, 2024–25
- Hungarian Cup: 2025–26
