= Pascal Jansen =

Dutch football manager (born 1973)

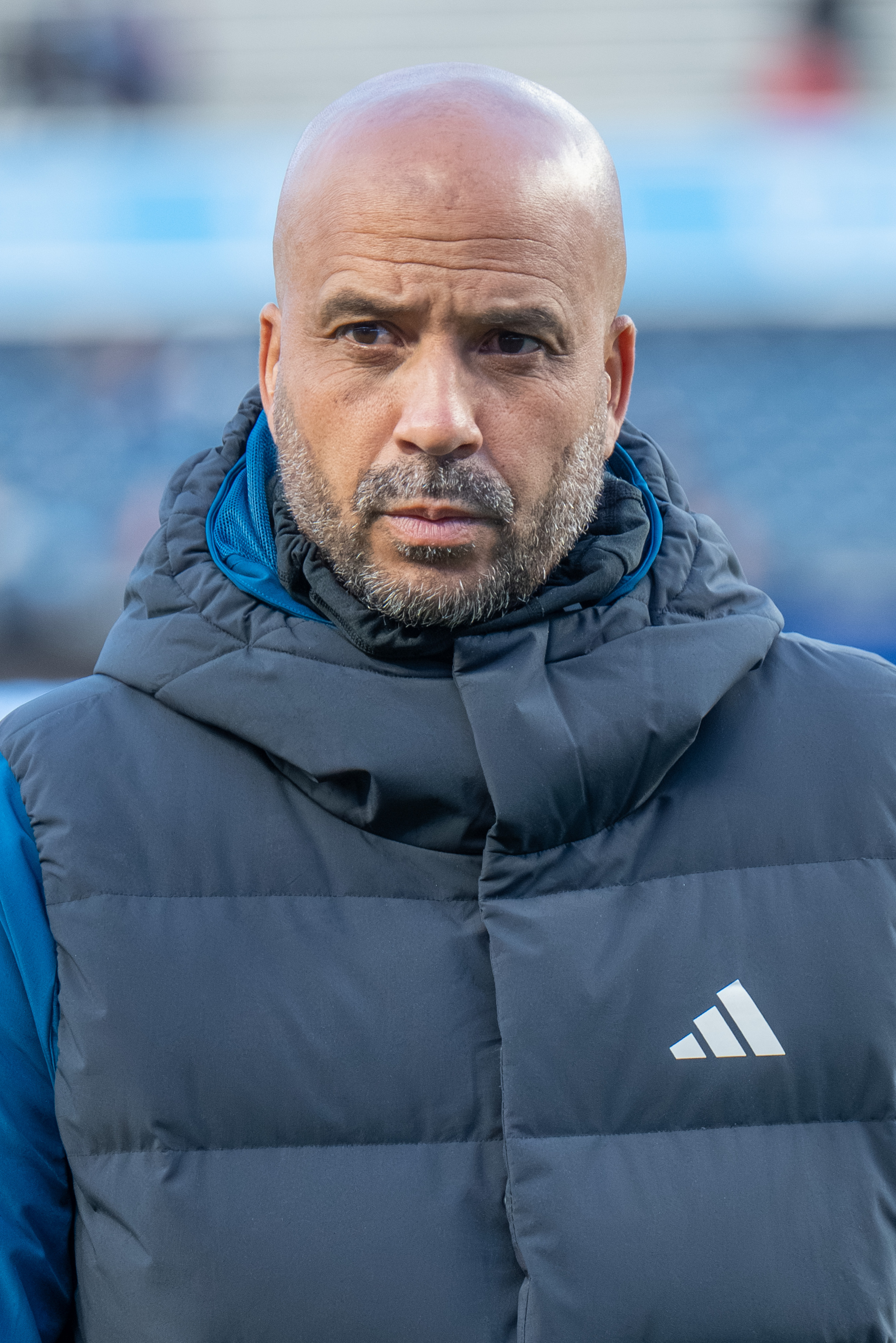
- Jansen in 2026 with New York City FC

Personal information
- Date of birth: 27 January 1973 (age 53)
- Place of birth: London, England

Youth career
- Years: Team
- AZ
- Ajax
- Haarlem
- Telstar

Managerial career
- 2015–2017: Jong PSV
- 2020–2024: AZ
- 2024: Ferencváros
- 2025–2026: New York City FC

Pascal Jansen (born 27 January 1973) is a Dutch professional football coach and former player who was most recently the head coach of Major League Soccer club New York City FC.

He played youth football, but his career was cut short due to a knee injury.

== Early life ==
Jansen was born in London, England to Hans Jansen and Sue Chaloner. His father is a Dutch musician, and his mother an English pop singer who was a member of the musical duo Spooky and Sue. He moved to the Netherlands at a young age and was raised in Zaandam. He holds dual Dutch and British citizenship.

== Playing career ==
Jansen played youth football for AZ, Ajax, Haarlem and Telstar, but retired due to a knee injury before making his professional debut.

== Coaching career ==
=== Early career ===
Jansen spent his early career coaching in the Netherlands at Haarlem, Vitesse and Sparta Rotterdam, and in the United Arab Emirates with Al Jazira and Al Wahda.

=== PSV ===
Jansen worked as a coach at PSV between 2013 and 2018, and was manager of their youth team between July 2015 and June 2017.

=== AZ ===
He moved to AZ to work as a coach in July 2018, before being promoted to manager in December 2020, on a contract until the end of the season. He was dismissed on 17 January 2024 after narrowly avoiding a KNVB Cup upset against amateur club Quick Boys.

=== Ferencváros ===
On 13 June 2024, he was appointed as the manager of Hungarian side Ferencváros. He debuted with a 5–0 victory over The New Saints in the 2024–25 UEFA Champions League qualifying phase at Groupama Aréna in Budapest on 23 July 2024. On 3 August 2024, he debuted in the 2024–25 Nemzeti Bajnokság I with a 1–0 victory over Kecskeméti TE. On 31 December 2024, he left Ferencváros.

=== New York City FC ===
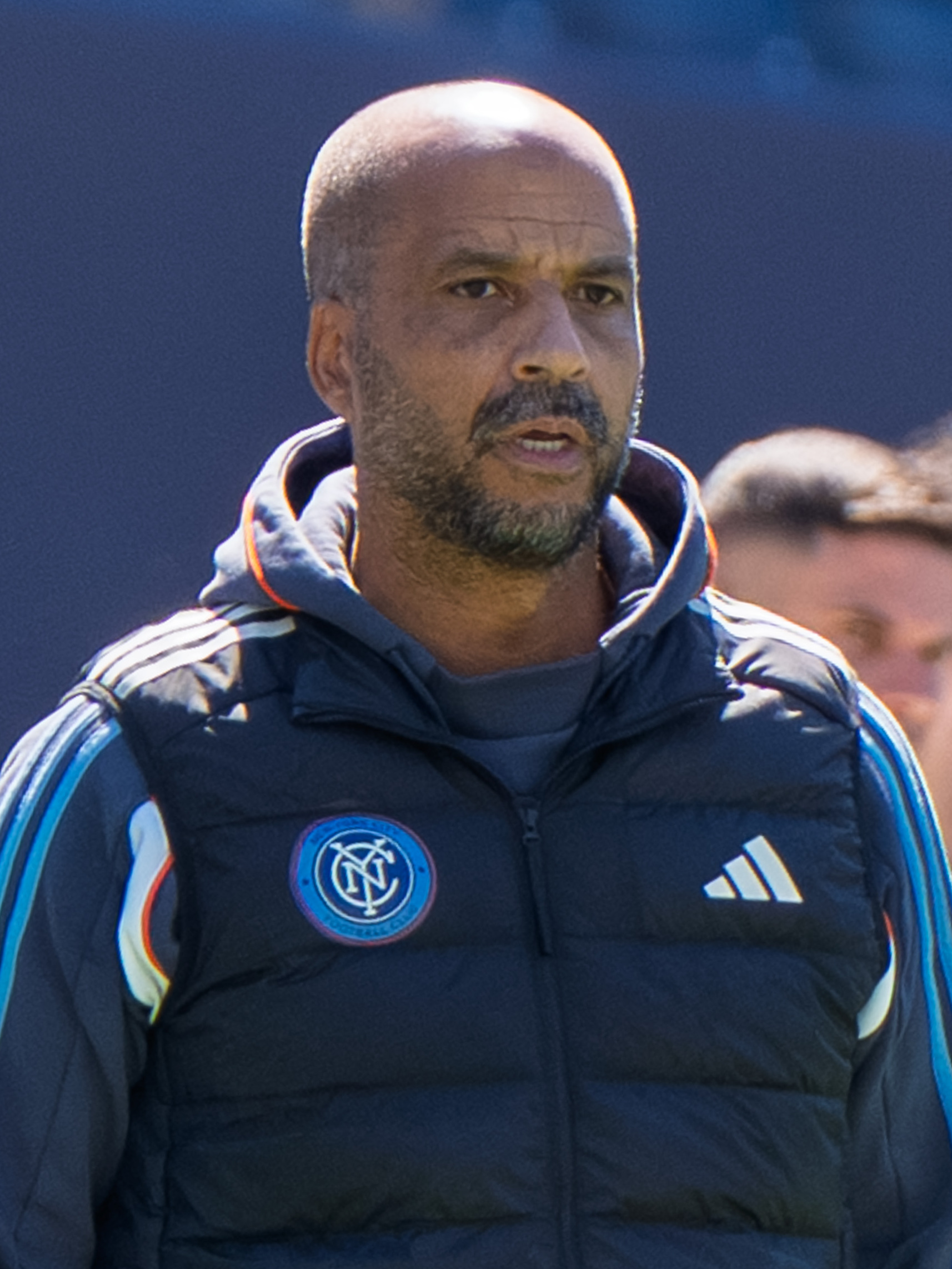
Jansen in 2025 with New York City FC.

On 6 January 2025, Jansen was named head coach of New York City FC on a four-year contract.

On 8 November 2026, New York City FC announced that it had parted ways with Jansen after two seasons.

== Managerial statistics ==
As of 8 November 2026

Managerial record by team and tenure
Team	From	To	Record					Ref
Team	From	To	G	W	D	L	Win %	Ref
Jong PSV	1 July 2015	30 June 2017	74	33	18	23	44.59	
AZ	5 December 2020	17 January 2024	162	94	26	42	58.02	
Ferencváros	13 June 2024	31 December 2024	30	17	7	6	56.67	
New York City	6 January 2025	8 November 2026	83	34	17	32	40.96	
Total			348	177	69	102	50.86	—
