= 2023 Bulgarian Supercup =

Финал за Суперкупата на България 2023
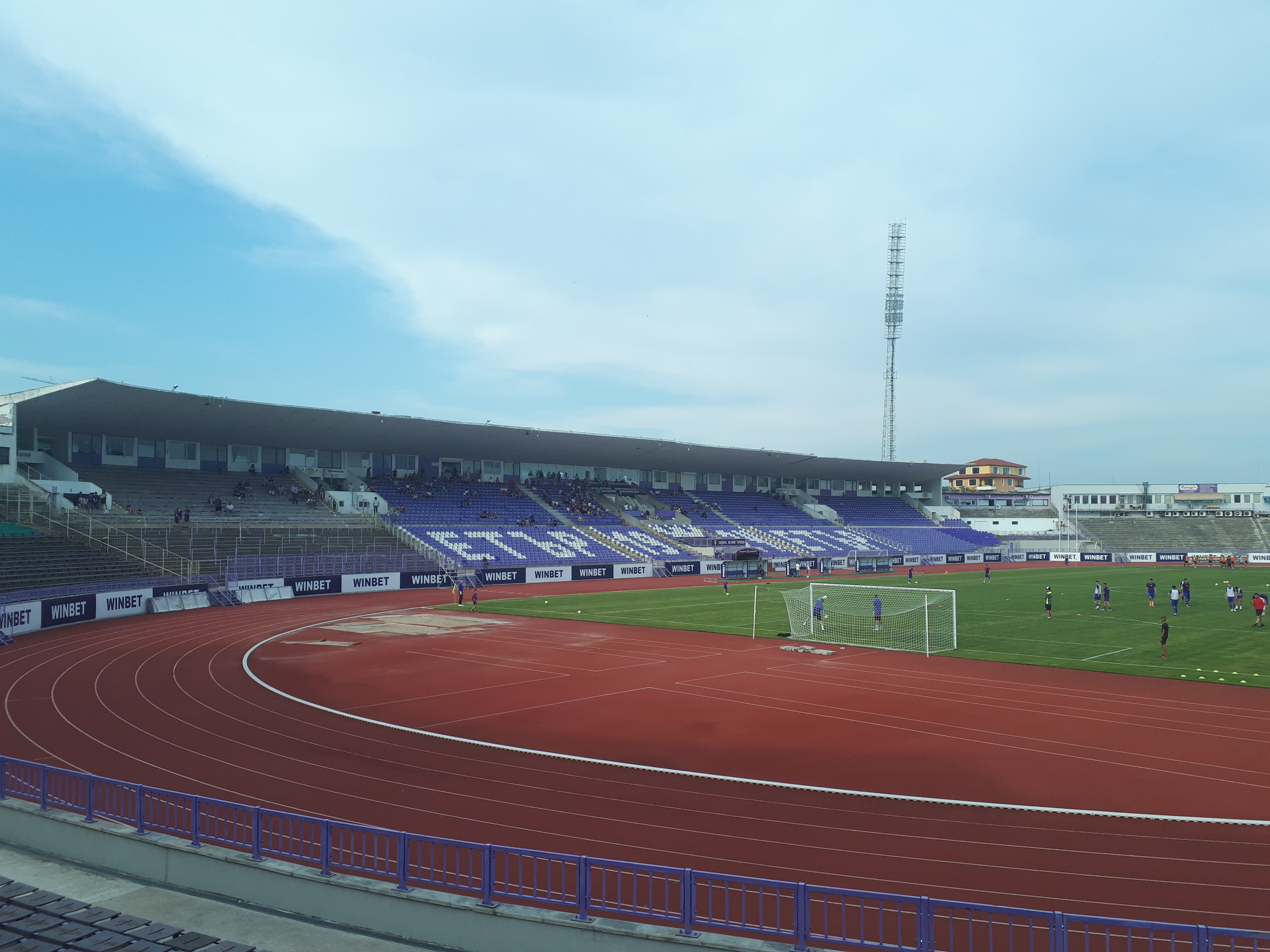
Ludogorets	CSKA 1948
First League	Bulgarian Cup
1	1
- Ludogorets won 4–2 on penalties
- Date: 10 February 2024
- Venue: Stadion Ivaylo, Veliko Tarnovo
- Referee: Georgi Kabakov (Plovdiv)
- Attendance: 1,344
- Weather: Cloudy; 19 °C (66 °F)

The 2023 Bulgarian Supercup was the 20th edition of the Bulgarian Supercup, an annual football match played between the winners of the previous season's First League and the Bulgarian Cup. The game was played between the champions of the 2022–23 First League, Ludogorets Razgrad, and the 2023 Bulgarian Cup runners-up, CSKA 1948, since Ludogorets won both trophies.

This was Ludogorets's 11th Supercup appearance and CSKA 1948's first. It was also the two teams' first meeting in the Supercup.

Initially supposed to be played in July 2023, the game has been rescheduled due to the participation of both teams in European competition. On 15 December 2023 the Bulgarian Professional Football League announced that the game has been scheduled for 10 February 2024.

The match finished 1–1, but Ludogorets won 4–2 on penalties for their 7th Supercup title.

== Match details ==
10 February 2024
15:00 UTC+2

Ludogorets Razgrad	1−1	CSKA 1948
Verdon 9' (pen.)	Report	Piščević 62'
Penalties
Duah (penalty scored); Nedelev (penalty scored); Piotrowski (penalty missed); Fonn Witry (penalty scored); Verdon (penalty scored)	4–2	(penalty scored) Pedrinho; (penalty missed) Karagaren; (penalty scored) Tsenov; (penalty missed) Daskalov

Stadion Ivaylo, Veliko Tarnovo
Attendance: 1,344
Referee: Georgi Kabakov (Plovdiv)

Ludogorets	CSKA 1948

GK	1	(Netherlands) Sergio Padt
RB	16	(Norway) Aslak Fonn Witry	(yellow card) 60'
CB	26	(The Gambia) Noah Sonko Sundberg
CB	24	(Benin) Olivier Verdon
LB	17	(Spain) Son
CM	6	(Poland) Jakub Piotrowski (c)	(yellow card) 59'
CM	30	(Brazil) Pedro Naressi
AM	88	(Bulgaria) Todor Nedelev
RW	37	(Ghana) Bernard Tekpetey	(yellow card) 15'	(substituted off) 68'
CF	9	(Switzerland) Kwadwo Duah
LW	77	(Brazil) Caio Vidal	(yellow card) 53'	(substituted off) 68'
Substitutes:
GK	12	(Croatia) Simon Sluga
DF	4	(Portugal) Dinis Almeida
DF	5	(Bulgaria) Georgi Terziev
DF	14	(Israel) Denny Gropper
MF	80	(Bulgaria) Metodiy Stefanov
FW	7	(Brazil) Rick	(substituted on) 68'
FW	18	(Brazil) Raí Nascimento
FW	90	(Bulgaria) Spas Delev
FW	99	(Brazil) Rwan Cruz	(substituted on) 68'
Manager:
(Bulgaria) Georgi Dermendzhiev

GK	29	(Bulgaria) Daniel Naumov
RB	2	(Brazil) Johnathan	(yellow card) 8' (yellow-red card) 48'
CB	23	(Bulgaria) Emil Viyachki	(yellow card) 45+1'
CB	22	(Bulgaria) Reyan Daskalov
LB	15	(Bulgaria) Simeon Vasilev	(yellow card) 54'
CM	28	(Serbia) Nedeljko Piščević		(substituted off) 90+4'
CM	18	(Bulgaria) Ivaylo Chochev (c)	(yellow card) 36'
AM	7	(Brazil) Thalis		(substituted off) 85'
LW	10	(Bulgaria) Radoslav Kirilov		(substituted off) 46'
CF	20	(Bulgaria) Antonio Vutov	(yellow card) 64'	(substituted off) 76'
RW	17	(Bulgaria) Nikola Iliev		(substituted off) 46'
Substitutes:
GK	33	(Ukraine) Hennadiy Hanyev
DF	30	(Bulgaria) Mihail Tsonev
DF	91	(Republic of the Congo) Ryan Bidounga	(substituted on) 76'	(yellow card) 89'
DF	92	(Cameroon) Pierre-Daniel N'Guinda
MF	8	(Brazil) Pedrinho	(substituted on) 46'
MF	9	(Bulgaria) Birsent Karagaren	(substituted on) 46'
MF	21	(Bulgaria) Emil Tsenov	(substituted on) 90+4'
MF	58	(Bulgaria) Marto Boychev	(substituted on) 85'
FW	98	(Bulgaria) Valentin Yoskov
Manager:
(Bulgaria) Nikolay Panayotov

Match officials

- Assistant referees:
  - Martin Margaritov (Plovdiv)
  - Diyan Valkov (Varna)
- Fourth official:
  - Georgi Ginchev (Veliko Tarnovo)
- Video assistant referee:
  - Radoslav Gidzhenov (Plovdiv)
- Assistant video assistant referees:
  - Vladimir Valkov (Plovdiv)

Match rules

- 90 minutes.
- No overtime.
- Penalty shoot-out if scores still level.
- Seven named substitutes.
- Maximum of five substitutions. (Note: Each team was given only three opportunities to make substitutions excluding substitutions made at half-time.)
