= 2022–23 PFC Ludogorets Razgrad season =

Ludogorets Razgrad
2022–23 season
- Chairman: Aleksandar Aleksandrov
- Manager: Ante Šimundža (until 7 March 2023); Ivaylo Petev (since 7 March 2023)
- First League: 1st
- Bulgarian Cup: Winners
- Bulgarian Supercup: Winners
- Champions League: Third qualifying round
- Europa League: Group stage
- Conference League: Knockout round play-offs
- Top goalscorer: League: Igor Thiago (15); All: Igor Thiago (20)
- Highest home attendance: 10,011 v. Roma (8 September 2022)
- Lowest home attendance: 127 v. Botev Vratsa (8 April 2023)
- Average home league attendance: 1,393
- Biggest win: 8–1 v. Botev Vratsa (H)
- Biggest defeat: 2–4 v. Dinamo Zagreb (A)
Home colours	Away colours	Third colours

The 2022–23 season was Ludogorets Razgrad's twelfth consecutive season in the Bulgarian First League, of which they are defending champions. This article shows player statistics and all matches (official and friendly) that the club has played during the season.

In addition to successfully defending the league title for a record time, Ludogorets won the Bulgarian Cup and the Bulgarian Supercup, achieving the domestic treble for a second time in the club's history.

== Squad ==
As of match played 22 May 2022

No.	Name	Nationality	Position	Date of birth (age)	Signed from	Signed in	Contract ends	Apps.	Goals
Goalkeepers
1	Sergio Padt	(Netherlands)	GK	6 June 1990 (age 36)	Groningen	2021		48	0
12	Simon Sluga	(Croatia)	GK	17 March 1993 (age 33)	Luton Town	2022		14	0
67	Damyan Hristov	(Bulgaria)	GK	11 October 2002 (age 24)	Youth Team	2020		1	0
Defenders
3	Anton Nedyalkov	(Bulgaria)	DF	30 April 1993 (age 33)	FC Dallas	2018		169	2
4	Cicinho	(Bulgaria)	DF	26 December 1988 (age 37)	Santos	2015		244	6
5	Georgi Terziev	(Bulgaria)	DF	18 April 1992 (age 34)	Chernomorets Burgas	2013		204	6
14	Denny Gropper	(Israel)	DF	16 March 1999 (age 27)	Hapoel Tel Aviv	2022		21	1
15	Pedro Henrique	(Brazil)	DF	31 January 2001 (age 25)	Internacional	2022		1	0
16	Aslak Fonn Witry	(Norway)	DF	10 March 1996 (age 30)	AZ Alkmaar	2022		17	0
21	Žan Karničnik	(Slovenia)	DF	18 September 1994 (age 32)	Mura	2022		23	0
24	Olivier Verdon	(Benin)	DF	5 October 1995 (age 31)	Alavés	2021		95	5
30	Ihor Plastun	(Ukraine)	DF	20 August 1990 (age 36)	Gent	2021		140	6
58	Dimitar Iliev	(Bulgaria)	DF	22 June 1999 (age 27)	Botev Vratsa	2022		2	1
Midfielders
6	Jakub Piotrowski	(Poland)	MF	4 October 1997 (age 29)	Fortuna Düsseldorf	2022		26	2
8	Claude Gonçalves	(Portugal)	MF	9 April 1994 (age 32)	Gil Vicente	2021		52	0
17	Jorginho	(Guinea-Bissau)	MF	21 September 1995 (age 31)	Saint-Étienne	2019		47	9
20	Nonato	(Brazil)	MF	3 March 1998 (age 28)	Internacional	2022		16	1
23	Show	(Angola)	MF	6 March 1999 (age 27)	Lille	2021		53	4
30	Pedrinho	(Brazil)	MF	10 January 1998 (age 28)	Ceará	2022		11	0
64	Dominik Yankov	(Bulgaria)	MF	13 July 2000 (age 26)	Sunderland	2017		99	12
75	Petar Georgiev	(Bulgaria)	MF	10 May 2002 (age 24)	Youth Team	2020		4	0
82	Ivan Yordanov	(Bulgaria)	MF	7 November 2000 (age 26)	Youth Team	2019		20	1
95	Cauly	(Brazil)	MF	15 September 1995 (age 31)	SC Paderborn	2020		114	27
Forwards
9	Thiago	(Brazil)	FW	26 June 2001 (age 25)	Cruzeiro	2022		33	5
10	Matías Tissera	(Argentina)	FW	6 September 1996 (age 30)	Platense	2022		42	18
11	Kiril Despodov	(Bulgaria)	FW	11 November 1996 (age 29)	Cagliari	2021		94	26
37	Bernard Tekpetey	(Ghana)	FW	3 September 1997 (age 29)	Schalke 04	2021		105	23
73	Rick	(Brazil)	MF	2 September 1999 (age 27)	Ceará	2021		47	6
90	Spas Delev	(Bulgaria)	FW	22 September 1989 (age 37)	Arda Kardzhali	2022		39	4
Players away on loan
29	Dorin Rotariu	(Romania)	FW	29 July 1995 (age 31)	Astana	2021		10	1
51	Ilker Budinov	(Bulgaria)	MF	11 August 2000 (age 26)	Youth Team	2019		6	0
Players who left during the season
7	Alex Santana	(Brazil)	MF	13 May 1995 (age 31)	Botafogo	2020		77	14
19	Pieros Sotiriou	(Cyprus)	FW	13 January 1993 (age 33)	Astana	2021		61	29
32	Josué Sá	(Portugal)	DF	17 June 1992 (age 34)	Anderlecht	2020		24	5

== Transfers ==
=== In ===
Date	Position	Nationality	Name	From	Fee	Ref.
28 July 2022	MF	(Poland)	Jakub Piotrowski	Fortuna Düsseldorf	Undisclosed	
30 August 2022	DF	(Norway)	Aslak Fonn Witry	AZ Alkmaar	Undisclosed	
2 September 2022	MF	(Brazil)	Nonato	Internacional	Undisclosed	
2 September 2022	MF	(Brazil)	Pedrinho	Ceará	Undisclosed	
5 September 2022	DF	(Brazil)	Pedro Henrique	Internacional	Undisclosed	

=== Out ===
Date	Position	Nationality	Name	To	Fee	Ref.
22 June 2022	MF	(Bulgaria)	Serkan Yusein	Beroe	Free	
1 July 2022	MF	(Bulgaria)	Wanderson	Sport Recife	Free	
11 July 2022	DF	(Suriname)	Shaquille Pinas	Hammarby	Undisclosed	
17 July 2022	DF	(Democratic Republic of the Congo)	Jordan Ikoko	Pafos	Free	
28 July 2022	FW	(Spain)	Higinio Marín	Albacete	Undisclosed	
29 July 2022	MF	(Brazil)	Alex Santana	Athletico Paranaense	€2.5M	
31 July 2022	FW	(Cyprus)	Pieros Sotiriou	Sanfrecce Hiroshima	€1.5M	
28 August 2022	DF	(Portugal)	Josué Sá	Rio Ave	Undisclosed	

=== Loans out ===
Start date	Position	Nationality	Name	To	End date	Ref.
1 July 2022	FW	(Romania)	Dorin Rotariu	Atromitos	30 June 2023	
24 July 2022	DF	(Bulgaria)	Ilker Budinov	Spartak Varna	30 June 2023	

== Friendlies ==
13 June 2022	Ludogorets Razgrad	5–1	Strumska Slava	Bansko
10:30 UTC+3	Georgiev 5'; Santana 23'; Tissera 29'; Tekpetey 57'; Thiago 62'	Report	Dobrev 75'	Stadium: Evima Sports Complex

19 June 2022	Ludogorets Razgrad (Bulgaria)	1–0	(Austria) Blau-Weiß Linz	Kufstein, Austria
17:00 UTC+2	Tekpetey 21'	Report		Stadium: Kufstein Arena

22 June 2022	Ludogorets Razgrad (Bulgaria)	1–1	(Germany) Greuther Fürth	Kufstein, Austria
18:00 UTC+2	Tekpetey 1'	Report	Jung 51'	Stadium: Kufstein Arena
Note: The match was played in two halves of 60 minutes each.

25 June 2022	Ludogorets Razgrad (Bulgaria)	0–3	(Hungary) Ferencváros	Kufstein, Austria
17:00 UTC+2		Report	Marquinhos 55'; Wingo 81', 90'	Stadium: Kufstein Arena

26 June 2022	Ludogorets Razgrad (Bulgaria)	3–0	(Germany) Nürnberg	Kufstein, Austria
16:00 UTC+2	Delev 9'; Gonçalves 78'; Rick 90'	Report		Stadium: Kufstein Arena

== Competitions ==
=== Overview ===
Competition	First match	Last match	Starting round	Final position	Record							
Competition	First match	Last match	Starting round	Final position	Pld	W	D	L	GF	GA	GD	Win %
First League	8 July 2022	7 June 2023	Matchday 1	Winners	35	26	7	2	81	27	+54	74.29
Bulgarian Cup	18 November 2022	24 May 2023	Round of 32	Winners	6	5	0	1	12	6	+6	83.33
Bulgarian Supercup	1 September 2022		Final	Winners	1	0	1	0	2	2	+0	0.00
UEFA Champions League	5 July 2022	9 August 2022	First qualifying round	Third qualifying round	6	3	0	3	10	8	+2	50.00
UEFA Europa League	18 August 2022	3 November 2022	Play-off round	Group stage	8	3	2	3	12	12	+0	37.50
UEFA Europa Conference League	16 February 2023	23 February 2023	Knockout round play-offs	Knockout round play-offs	2	1	0	1	2	2	+0	50.00
Total					58	38	10	10	119	57	+62	65.52

Last updated: 7 June 2023
Source: Competitions

=== First League ===
==== Regular stage ====
===== Table =====
Pos	Team	Pld	W	D	L	GF	GA	GD	Pts	Qualification
1	Ludogorets Razgrad	30	23	5	2	72	21	+51	74	Qualification for the Championship group
2	CSKA Sofia	30	23	4	3	57	14	+43	73	Qualification for the Championship group
3	CSKA 1948	30	17	8	5	49	22	+27	59	Qualification for the Championship group
4	Levski Sofia	30	15	9	6	38	14	+24	54	Qualification for the Championship group
5	Cherno More	30	15	8	7	36	27	+9	53	Qualification for the Championship group

Source: soccerway, Bulgarian Football
Rules for classification: 1) Points; 2) Head-to-head points; 3) Head-to-head goal difference; 4) Head-to-head goals scored; 5) Head-to-head away goals scored (only if two teams); 6) Goal difference; 7) Goals scored; 8) Fairplay ranking; 9) Draw.

===== Results summary =====
Overall								Home						Away					
Pld	W	D	L	GF	GA	GD	Pts	W	D	L	GF	GA	GD	W	D	L	GF	GA	GD
30	23	5	2	72	21	+51	74	11	3	1	37	10	+27	12	2	1	35	11	+24

Last updated: 7 May 2023.
Source: See Results

===== Results by round =====
Game	1	2	3	4	5	6	7	8	9	10	11	12	13	14	15	16	17	18	19	20	21	22	23	24	25	26	27	28	29	30
Ground	A	H	A	H	A	H	A	A	H	A	H	A	H	A	H	H	A	H	A	H	A	H	H	A	H	A	H	A	H	A
Result	W	W	D	W	W	D	W	W	W	W	D	L	W	W	W	W	W	D	W	W	D	L	W	W	W	W	W	W	W	W
Position	1	1	2	1	3	4	3	2	2	1	1	3	2	2	2	2	2	2	2	2	2	2	2	2	2	2	2	1	1	1

Source: See Results
A = Away; H = Home; W = Win; D = Draw; L = Loss

===== Results =====
8 July 2022 1	Septemvri Sofia	0–3	Ludogorets Razgrad	Sofia
20:00 UTC+3	Peshov (red card) 22'; Ramadan (yellow card) 45'	Report	Santana 11'; Cauly 55'; Sotiriou 79'; Gropper (yellow card) 88'	Stadium: Natsionalen stadion Vasil Levski; Attendance: 200; Referee: Georgi Kabakov (Plovdiv)

15 July 2022 2	Ludogorets Razgrad	2–0	Lokomotiv Plovdiv	Razgrad
20:00 UTC+3	Tekpetey 50'; Cauly 87'	Report	Karagaren (yellow card) 21'; Zebli (yellow card) 48'; Petrović (yellow card) 85'	Stadium: Huvepharma Arena; Attendance: 700; Referee: Nikola Popov (Sofia)

22 July 2022 3	CSKA 1948	2–2	Ludogorets Razgrad	Bistritsa
20:00 UTC+3	Chochev 72'; Daskalov (yellow card) 74'; Rusev 75'; Naumov (yellow card) 82'	Report	Cauly 45+3'; Yordanov (yellow card) 47'; Despodov (yellow card) 64'; Nedyalkov (yellow card) 71'; Tekpetey 81'	Stadium: Bistritsa; Attendance: 350; Referee: Dragomir Draganov (Varna)

29 July 2022 4	Ludogorets Razgrad	5–0	Spartak Varna	Razgrad
20:00 UTC+3	Tekpetey 1'; Rick 5'; Thiago 12', 80'; Verdon (yellow card) 51'; Cicinho 76'; Despodov (yellow card) 90+4'	Report	Vasev (yellow card) 43'; Mendy (yellow card) 45'; Borisov (yellow card) 58'; Ibryam (yellow card) 70'	Stadium: Huvepharma Arena; Attendance: 800; Referee: Georgi Davidov (Veliko Tarnovo)

22 August 2022 7	Pirin Blagoevgrad	0–4	Ludogorets Razgrad	Blagoevgrad
19:30 UTC+3	Bengyuzov (yellow card) 48'; Velyev (yellow card) 55'; Takahashi (yellow card) 70'; Zanev (yellow card) 89'	Report	Terziev 50'; Takahashi 64' (o.g.); Show (yellow card) 72'; Tissera 79'; Jorginho 85'	Stadium: Hristo Botev; Attendance: 850; Referee: Nikola Popov (Sofia)

29 August 2022 8	Cherno More	2–3	Ludogorets Razgrad	Varna
17:00 UTC+3	Biai (yellow card) 21'; Benchaâ 45+2', (yellow card) 45+2'; Velev (yellow card) 56'; Serdyuk (yellow card) 64', (goal) 76' (pen.)	Report	Despodov 2'; Tissera (yellow card) 28', (goal) 48'; Terziev (yellow card) 53'; Tekpetey 66'; Padt (yellow card) 85'; Piotrowski (yellow card) 90+5'	Stadium: Ticha; Attendance: 3,600; Referee: Ivo Andreev (Sofia)

4 September 2022 9	Ludogorets Razgrad	6–0	Hebar	Razgrad
20:00 UTC+3	Yordanov 3'; Rick 27'; Tekpetey 37'; Delev 44', 48'; Terziev (yellow card) 45+2'; Despodov 61'	Report	M. Mihaylov (yellow card) 42'; Eseola (yellow card) 57'	Stadium: Huvepharma Arena; Attendance: 400; Referee: Kevin Van Damme (Belgium)

11 September 2022 10	Botev Vratsa	0–4	Ludogorets Razgrad	Vratsa
20:15 UTC+3	Kavdanski (red card) 3'; Atanasov (yellow card) 16'; Ivaylov (yellow card) 45'; Valbuena (yellow card) 53'; Luiz Felipe (yellow card) 59'; Ferraresso (yellow card) 70'	Report	Despodov 17', 41' (pen.); Tissera 26'; Yordanov (yellow card) 38'; Cauly 90+2'	Stadium: Hristo Botev; Attendance: 500; Referee: Georgi Davidov (Veliko Tarnovo)

18 September 2022 11	Ludogorets Razgrad	1–1	Arda	Razgrad
19:45 UTC+3	Tissera 1'; Cauly (yellow card) 41'; Plastun (yellow card) 47'; Cicinho (yellow card) 71'	Report	Kotev (yellow card) 13'; Terziev 27' (o.g.); Lozev (yellow card) 57'; Ali (yellow card) 78' (yellow-red card) 90+2'; Stoev (yellow card) 90'	Stadium: Huvepharma Arena; Attendance: 450; Referee: Georgi Dimitrov (Sofia)

1 October 2022 12	Lokomotiv Sofia	1–0	Ludogorets Razgrad	Sofia
13:45 UTC+3	Celso (yellow card) 14'; Duarte (yellow card) 50'; Hadzhiev (yellow card) 52'; França 71'; Katsarov (yellow card) 83'; Vutov (red card) 87'	Report	Cicinho (red card) 14'; Tekpetey (yellow card) 69'; Tissera (yellow card) 86'	Stadium: Lokomotiv; Attendance: 0 Referee: Georgi Ginchev (Veliko Tarnovo)
Note: The game was played behind closed doors due to a punishment by the BFU on Lokomotiv Sofia.

10 October 2022 13	Ludogorets Razgrad	2–1	CSKA Sofia	Razgrad
20:00 UTC+3	Tissera 9'; Gropper (yellow card) 33'; Verdon (yellow card) 65'; Tekpetey (yellow card) 68'; Piotrowski 79'	Report	Moreno (yellow card) 37'; Youga 56'; Mattheij (yellow card) 58'; Geferson (yellow card) 68'	Stadium: Huvepharma Arena; Attendance: 4,500; Referee: Georgi Kabakov (Plovdiv)

17 October 2022 14	Beroe	0–4	Ludogorets Razgrad	Stara Zagora
20:00 UTC+3	Georgiev (yellow card) 39'; Mechev (yellow card) 64'; Mitkov (yellow card) 90+1'	Report	Tekpetey 51', 78'; Thiago 74'; Tissera 81'	Stadium: Beroe; Attendance: 700; Referee: Valentin Zhelezov (Burgas)

23 October 2022 15	Ludogorets Razgrad	1–0	Botev Plovdiv	Razgrad
19:15 UTC+3	Piotrowski 65', (yellow card) 67'	Report	Brahimi (yellow card) 53'; Herman (yellow card) 62'; Mertens (yellow card) 66'; Genev (yellow card) 73'	Stadium: Huvepharma Arena; Attendance: 850; Referee: Ivo Andreev (Sofia)

30 October 2022 16	Ludogorets Razgrad	3–1	Septemvri Sofia	Razgrad
17:45 UTC+3	Gropper (yellow card) 15'; Tissera 39'; Verdon 51' (pen.); Show 62'	Report	Chandarov 16' (pen.); Georgiev (yellow card) 48'; Gavrilov (yellow card) 84'	Stadium: Huvepharma Arena; Attendance: 400; Referee: Georgi Ivanov (Sofia)

8 November 2022 17	Lokomotiv Plovdiv	2–3	Ludogorets Razgrad	Plovdiv
17:30 UTC+2	Paskalev 4'; Zebli (yellow card) 24'; Karakashev (yellow card) 35'; Giovanny 64'; Vasilev (yellow card) 72'; Matheus (yellow card) 85'; Iliev (yellow card) 90+2'	Report	Tissera 19', 28'; Cauly (yellow card) 36', (goal) 39'; Padt (yellow card) 90+3'	Stadium: Lokomotiv; Attendance: 3,500; Referee: Georgi Davidov (Veliko Tarnovo)

13 November 2022 18	Ludogorets Razgrad	1–1	CSKA 1948	Razgrad
17:45 UTC+2	Piotrowski (yellow card) 46'; Naressi (yellow card) 68'; Tekpetey 76', (yellow card) 90'	Report	Umarbayev (yellow card) 31'; Daskalov (yellow card) 38'; Kolev (yellow card) 77'; Kirilov 83'; Octávio (yellow card) 86'; Topuzov (yellow card) 89'; Johnathan (yellow card) 90+2' (yellow-red card) 90+3'	Stadium: Huvepharma Arena; Attendance: 1,500; Referee: Nikola Popov (Sofia)

26 November 2022 5	Slavia Sofia	1–2	Ludogorets Razgrad	Sofia
15:00 UTC+2	Ivanov 49'; Viyachki (yellow card) 78'; G. Petkov (red card) 87'	Report	Tissera 10'; Thiago (yellow card) 78'; Despodov 83'	Stadium: Aleksandar Shalamanov; Attendance: 478; Referee: Dragomir Draganov (Varna)
Note: Originally scheduled for 5 August 2022, the match was postponed by the BFU due to Ludogorets' participation in the UCL.

1 December 2022 6	Ludogorets Razgrad	0–0	Levski Sofia	Razgrad
15:00 UTC+2	Cauly (yellow card) 54'; Piotrowski (yellow card) 62'; Naressi (yellow card) 82'; Rick (yellow card) 84'; Verdon (yellow card) 86'	Report	van der Kaap (yellow card) 7'; Milanov (yellow card) 66'; Córdoba (yellow card) 73'; Petkov (yellow card) 77'; Popov (yellow card) 86'; Kraev (yellow card) 88'; Mitkov (yellow card) 90+7'	Stadium: Huvepharma Arena; Attendance: 1,200; Referee: Stanislav Todorov (Shumen)
Note: Originally scheduled for 14 August 2022, the match was postponed by the BFU due to both teams' participation in UEFA competitions.

11 February 2023 19	Spartak Varna	1–2	Ludogorets Razgrad	Varna
15:00 UTC+2	Luan 57'; Dimov (yellow card) 61'; Antwi (yellow card) 72'; Ivey (yellow card) 76'; Vasev (yellow card) 78'	Report	Despodov 8'; Thiago 20'; Nedyalkov (yellow card) 56'; Show (yellow card) 90+2'	Stadium: Spartak; Attendance: 2,000; Referee: Georgi Ginchev (Veliko Tarnovo)

19 February 2023 20	Ludogorets Razgrad	2–1	Slavia Sofia	Razgrad
17:45 UTC+2	Delev 18'; Naressi (yellow card) 77'; Nonato 90+3'	Report	Tasevski (yellow card) 53'; Tasev 75' (pen.); Ahmedov (yellow card) 76'; Nikolov (yellow card) 77'; Dobrev (yellow card) 88'; Soares (yellow card) 81'; Petrov (yellow card) 88'	Stadium: Huvepharma Arena; Attendance: 700; Referee: Nikola Popov (Sofia)

28 February 2023 21	Levski Sofia	0–0	Ludogorets Razgrad	Sofia
17:45 UTC+2	Popov (yellow card) 44'; Tsunami (yellow card) 63'; Petris (yellow card) 82'	Report	Naressi (yellow card) 56'; Russo (yellow card) 62'; Show (yellow card) 69'; Gonçalves (yellow card) 72'; Yankov (yellow card) 82'	Stadium: Vivacom Arena - Georgi Asparuhov; Attendance: 8,500; Referee: Georgi Kabakov (Plovdiv)

5 March 2023 22	Ludogorets Razgrad	0–1	Pirin Blagoevgrad	Razgrad
15:45 UTC+2	Russo (yellow card) 87'; Thiago (yellow card) 90+1'	Report	P. Yordanov 45+1' (pen.); Makreckis (yellow card) 87'; Smolenski (yellow card) 90+1'; Kovalyov (yellow card) 90+4'	Stadium: Huvepharma Arena; Attendance: 850; Referee: Ivelin Zanev (Ruse)

12 March 2023 23	Ludogorets Razgrad	3–2	Cherno More	Razgrad
14:15 UTC+2	Despodov 20', 75' (pen.), 90+1'; Pipa (yellow card) 53'	Report	Isa 8', 34'; Stefanov (yellow card) 36'; Soula (yellow card) 54'; Popov (yellow card) 68'; Panayotov (yellow card) 69' (yellow-red card) 73'; Dyulgerov (yellow card) 79'	Stadium: Huvepharma Arena; Attendance: 1,244; Referee: Georgi Ginchev (Veliko Tarnovo)

18 March 2023 24	Hebar	1–3	Ludogorets Razgrad	Pazardzhik
14:30 UTC+2	Valpoort 44'; Isuf (yellow card) 59'; Mazáň (yellow card) 85'; Sylla (yellow card) 90'	Report	Delev 22', 70'; Russo (yellow card) 48'; Thiago 90+4'	Stadium: Georgi Benkovski; Attendance: 1,600; Referee: Stanislav Todorov (Shumen)

8 April 2023 25	Ludogorets Razgrad	8–1	Botev Vratsa	Razgrad
17:30 UTC+3	Despodov 29' (pen.), 57'; Thiago 35', 44', 46'; Caio Vidal 60'; Nonato (yellow card) 78'; Gonçalves 89'; Tissera 90+2'	Report	Rapnouil (yellow card) 27'; Ivaylov 82' (pen.); Kepov (yellow card) 87'	Stadium: Huvepharma Arena; Attendance: 127; Referee: Nikola Popov (Sofia)

14 April 2023 26	Arda	1–2	Ludogorets Razgrad	Kardzhali
18:00 UTC+3	Sako (yellow card) 1'; Toungara (yellow card) 36'; Tsonev 45+2'; Tetah (yellow card) 49'; Zhelev (yellow card) 61'; Petkov (yellow card) 69'	Report	Delev (yellow card) 19'; Naressi (yellow card) 45'; Plastun (yellow card) 61'; Thiago 77', 89'; Gonçalves (yellow card) 79'	Stadium: Arena Arda; Attendance: 1,700; Referee: Dragomir Draganov (Varna)

21 April 2023 27	Ludogorets Razgrad	1–0	Lokomotiv Sofia	Razgrad
18:45 UTC+3	Russo (yellow card) 59'; Thiago 81'; Tissera (yellow card) 89'	Report	Vutov (yellow card) 11'; Celso (yellow card) 22' (yellow-red card) 43'	Stadium: Huvepharma Arena; Attendance: 750; Referee: Georgi Dimitrov (Sofia)

30 April 2023 28	CSKA Sofia	0–1	Ludogorets Razgrad	Sofia
20:15 UTC+3	Carreazo (yellow card) 21'; Moreno (yellow card) 32'; Vion (yellow card) 41'; Mahmutović (yellow card) 51'; Turitsov (yellow card) 69'; Lindseth (yellow card) 86'	Report	Nonato (yellow card) 24'; Witry (yellow card) 43'; Gonçalves (yellow card) 45+5'; Despodov (yellow card) 64'; Piotrowski (yellow card) 65'; Thiago 68', (yellow card) 69'; Verdon (yellow card) 80'; Caio Vidal (yellow card) 90+5'	Stadium: Balgarska Armia; Attendance: 17,600; Referee: Georgi Kabakov (Plovdiv)

3 May 2023 29	Ludogorets Razgrad	2–1	Beroe	Razgrad
20:30 UTC+3	Russo 45+2'; Delev 73'	Report	Cascardo (yellow card) 40'; Moise 41'; Vasilev (yellow card) 67'; Gomes (yellow card) 85'	Stadium: Huvepharma Arena; Attendance: 900; Referee: Ivaylo Stoyanov (Petrich)

7 May 2023 30	Botev Plovdiv	0–2	Ludogorets Razgrad	Plovdiv
20:15 UTC+3	Perera (yellow card) 23'; Eto'o (yellow card) 24'; Akere (yellow card) 26'	Report	Caio Vidal 27'; Thiago (yellow card) 38', (goal) 44'; Despodov (yellow card) 87'	Stadium: Hristo Botev; Attendance: 17,566; Referee: Georgi Ginchev (Veliko Tarnovo)

==== Championship stage ====
===== Table =====
Pos	Team	Pld	W	D	L	GF	GA	GD	Pts	Qualification
1	Ludogorets Razgrad (C)	35	26	7	2	81	27	+54	85	Qualification for the Champions League first qualifying round
2	CSKA Sofia	35	26	6	3	65	17	+48	84	Qualification for the Europa Conference League second qualifying round
3	CSKA 1948	35	17	13	5	55	28	+27	64	Qualification for the Europa Conference League second qualifying round
4	Levski Sofia (O)	35	17	10	8	47	22	+25	61	Qualification for the Europa Conference League play-off
5	Lokomotiv Plovdiv	35	15	9	11	35	34	+1	54 (Note: Head-to-head points: Lokomotiv Plovdiv 3, Cherno More 3. Head-to-head goal difference: Lokomotiv Plovdiv +2, Cherno More -2.)	
6	Cherno More	35	15	9	11	39	35	+4	54	

Source: Soccerway, Bulgarian Football
Rules for classification: 1) Points; 2) Head-to-head points; 3) Head-to-head goal difference; 4) Head-to-head goals scored; 5) Head-to-head away goals scored (only if two teams); 6) Goal difference; 7) Goals scored; 8) Fairplay ranking; 9) Draw.
(C) Champions; (O) Play-off winners

===== Results summary =====
Overall								Home						Away					
Pld	W	D	L	GF	GA	GD	Pts	W	D	L	GF	GA	GD	W	D	L	GF	GA	GD
5	3	2	0	9	6	+3	11	2	1	0	6	4	+2	1	1	0	3	2	+1

Last updated: 7 June 2023.
Source: See results

===== Results by round =====
Round	1	2	3	4	5
Ground	H	H	A	H	A
Result	W	D	D	W	W
Position	1	1	2	1	1

Source: See Results
A = Away; H = Home; W = Win; D = Draw; L = Loss

===== Matches =====
15 May 2023 31	Ludogorets Razgrad	1–0	Lokomotiv Plovdiv	Razgrad
20:15 UTC+3	Nedelev 42'; Caio Vidal (yellow card) 79'; Russo (yellow card) 86'	Report		Stadium: Huvepharma Arena; Attendance: 750; Referee: Volen Chinkov (Sofia)

20 May 2023 32	Ludogorets Razgrad	2–2	CSKA Sofia	Razgrad
20:15 UTC+3	Despodov (yellow card) 14', (goal) 18'; Russo (yellow card) 25'; Thiago 48', (yellow card) 85'; Padt (yellow card) 85'; Tissera (yellow card) 86'; Naressi (yellow card) 90+5'	Report	Carreazo (yellow card) 19'; Heintz 22'; Lindseth (yellow card) 27'; Shopov (yellow card) 29'; Garcez 42'; Evtimov (yellow card) 58'; Mattheij (yellow card) 76'; Nazon (yellow card) 90+5'	Stadium: Huvepharma Arena; Attendance: 7,566; Referee: Georgi Kabakov (Plovdiv)

28 May 2023 33	CSKA 1948	2–2	Ludogorets Razgrad	Bistritsa
21:00 UTC+3	Sidcley (yellow card) 4'; Daskalov (yellow card) 53'; Pedrinho 58'; Chochev 86'; Topuzov (yellow card) 90+3'; Héliton (yellow card) 90+4'	Report	Delev 46'; Despodov 62'; Tekpetey (yellow card) 77'; Thiago (yellow card) 90+8'	Stadium: Bistritsa; Attendance: 145; Referee: Georgi Ginchev (Veliko Tarnovo)

3 June 2023 34	Ludogorets Razgrad	3–2	Levski Sofia	Razgrad
20:30 UTC+3	Despodov 23' (pen.); Plastun (yellow card) 42'; Nonato (yellow card) 44'; Piotrowski 66'; Thiago 72', (yellow card) 73'	Report	Stefanov (yellow card) 15', (goal) 33'; Krastev 60'	Stadium: Huvepharma Arena; Attendance: 5,733; Referee: Nikola Popov (Sofia)

7 June 2023 35	Cherno More	0–1	Ludogorets Razgrad	Varna
18:45 UTC+3	Machado (yellow card) 40'; Fernandes (yellow card) 56'; Michael (yellow card) 84'	Report	Tissera 50', (yellow card) 85'; Gonçalves (yellow card) 75' (yellow-red card) 89'; Piotrowski (yellow card) 90+3'; Witry (yellow card) 90+5'	Stadium: Ticha; Attendance: 5,865; Referee: Volen Chinkov (Sofia)

=== Bulgarian Cup ===
18 November 2022 Round of 32	Rozova Dolina	0–2	Ludogorets Razgrad	Kazanlak
13:30 UTC+2	Ve. Ivanov (yellow card) 36' (yellow-red card) 40'; Stoichkov (yellow card) 40'; D. Ivanov (yellow card) 60'; I. Ivanov (yellow card) 60'; Va. Ivanov (yellow card) 77'	Report	Iliev 60', (yellow card) 69'; Gonçalves (yellow card) 64'; Thiago (yellow card) 88'; Rick 90+1'	Stadium: Sevtopolis; Attendance: 4,000; Referee: Krasen Georgiev (Varna)

4 December 2022 Round of 16	Ludogorets Razgrad	2–1	Levski Sofia	Razgrad
13:30 UTC+2	Piotrowski (yellow card) 24'; Thiago 69'; Tekpetey 79'; Verdon (yellow card) 90+9'	Report	van der Kaap (yellow card) 12'; Córdoba (yellow card) 42', (penalty missed) 90'; Welton 60'; Kraev (yellow card) 90+2'	Stadium: Huvepharma Arena; Attendance: 4,200; Referee: Georgi Davidov (Veliko Tarnovo)

4 April 2023 Quarterfinal	Ludogorets Razgrad	2–1	Spartak Varna	Razgrad
17:00 UTC+3	Piotrowski (yellow card) 35'; Caio Vidal 38'; Show 76'; Plastun (yellow card) 82'; Russo (yellow card) 90+3'	Report	Ivey (yellow card) 3'; Ewandro (yellow card) 23'; Belousov 25'; Dichevski (yellow card) FT	Stadium: Huvepharma Arena; Attendance: 450; Referee: Vladimir Valkov (Plovdiv)

25 April 2023 Semifinal 1st leg	Cherno More	1–2	Ludogorets Razgrad	Varna
18:30 UTC+3	Fernandes 13'; Vasilev (yellow card) 33'; Panayotov (yellow card) 66'; Velev (red card) 84'	Report	Nonato 17'; Plastun 34'; Tekpetey (yellow card) 87'; Naressi (yellow card) 90+2'	Stadium: Ticha; Attendance: 3,800; Referee: Volen Chinkov (Sofia)

11 May 2023 Semifinal 2nd leg	Ludogorets Razgrad	1–2 (a.e.t.) (3–3 agg.) (4–1 p)	Cherno More	Razgrad
19:00 UTC+3	Verdon (yellow card) 10'; Delev (yellow card) 31', (goal) 58'; Despodov (yellow card) 66'	Report	Panayotov 55'; Soula (yellow card) 73'; Georgiev (yellow card) 75'; Drobarov (yellow card) 82'; Atanasov (yellow card) 90+2'; Machado 90+6'; Iliev (yellow card) 99'; Dyulgerov (yellow card) 114'; Popov (yellow card) 119'	Stadium: Huvepharma Arena; Attendance: 1,000; Referee: Radoslav Gidzhenov (Plovdiv)
	Penalties
	Verdon (penalty scored); Tekpetey (penalty scored); Nedelev (penalty scored); Caio Vidal (penalty scored)		(penalty missed) Iliev; (penalty scored) Fernandes; (penalty missed) Pacheco

24 May 2023 Final	CSKA 1948	1–3	Ludogorets Razgrad	Sofia
19:00 UTC+3	Chochev 59'	Report	Caio Vidal 8', 43'; Naressi (yellow card) 32'; Thiago (yellow card) 62'; Nonato (yellow card) 80'; Tissera 81'; Sluga (yellow card) 90+7'	Stadium: Natsionalen stadion Vasil Levski; Attendance: 1,000; Referee: Dragomir Draganov (Varna)

=== Bulgarian Supercup ===
1 September 2022	Ludogorets Razgrad	2–2 (4–3 p)	Levski Sofia	Sofia
20:00 UTC+3	Verdon (yellow card) 23'; Tekpetey (yellow card) 26'; Piotrowski (yellow card) 38'; Cicinho (yellow card) 45+1'; Despodov 68', 72' (pen.); Plastun (yellow card) 71'; Thiago (yellow card) 76'; Rick (yellow card) 79'	Report	Córdoba (yellow card) 7'; Kraev (yellow card) 25'; Milanov 41'; Stefanov (yellow card) 47'; Andreev (yellow card) 70' van der Kaap (yellow card) 77', (goal) 90+2'	Stadium: Natsionalen stadion Vasil Levski; Attendance: 21,342; Referee: Georgi Kabakov (Plovdiv)
	Penalties
	Cauly (penalty scored); Rick (penalty missed); Cicinho (penalty scored); Thiago (penalty scored); Verdon (penalty scored)		(penalty scored) Popov; (penalty missed) Petkov; (penalty scored) Córdoba; (penalty scored) Bari; (penalty missed) Mitkov

=== UEFA Champions League ===
==== Qualifying rounds ====
5 July 2022 First qualifying round 1st leg	Ludogorets Razgrad (Bulgaria)	2–0	(Montenegro) Sutjeska Nikšić	Razgrad, Bulgaria
19:45 UTC+3	Santana 74'; Cicinho (yellow card) 81'; Tissera 90+1'	Report	Matanović (yellow card) 20'	Stadium: Huvepharma Arena; Attendance: 3,963; Referee: Vítor Ferreira (Portugal)

12 July 2022 First qualifying round 2nd leg	Sutjeska Nikšić (Montenegro)	0–1 (0–3 agg.)	(Bulgaria) Ludogorets Razgrad	Podgorica, Montenegro
21:00 UTC+2	Drinčić (yellow card) 38'; Krstović (yellow card) 64'	Report	Despodov (yellow card) 29'; Show (yellow card) 43'; Sotiriou 53'; Tekpetey (yellow card) 84'	Stadium: DG Arena; Attendance: 1,000; Referee: Gergő Bogár (Hungary)

19 July 2022 Second qualifying round 1st leg	Ludogorets Razgrad (Bulgaria)	3–0	(Republic of Ireland) Shamrock Rovers	Razgrad, Bulgaria
20:45 UTC+3	Sotiriou 26', 35'; Show (yellow card) 53'; Rick (yellow card) 57'; Cicinho (yellow card) 87'; Thiago 90+4'	Report	Gaffney (yellow card) 47'; Towell (yellow card) 59'	Stadium: Huvepharma Arena; Attendance: 4,983; Referee: João Pinheiro (Portugal)

26 July 2022 Second qualifying round 2nd leg	Shamrock Rovers (Republic of Ireland)	2–1 (2–4 agg.)	(Bulgaria) Ludogorets Razgrad	Dublin, Republic of Ireland
20:00 UTC+1	Greene 21', (yellow card) 85'; Finn (yellow card) 64'; Towell (yellow card) 66'; Farrugia (yellow card) 82'; Emakhu 88'	Report	Show (yellow card) 24' (yellow-red card) 51'; Tekpetey (yellow card) 39'; Santana (yellow card) 50'; Rick (yellow card) 55'; Cauly 90+1'	Stadium: Tallaght Stadium; Attendance: 6,322; Referee: Fabio Maresca (Italy)

2 August 2022 Third qualifying round 1st leg	Ludogorets Razgrad (Bulgaria)	1–2	(Croatia) Dinamo Zagreb	Razgrad, Bulgaria
20:45 UTC+3	Tekpetey 22', (yellow card) 60'; Verdon (yellow card) 65'; Despodov (yellow card) 74'	Report	Perić 6'; Padt 9' (o.g.); Mišić (yellow card) 42'	Stadium: Huvepharma Arena; Attendance: 7,505; Referee: Cüneyt Çakır (Turkey)

9 August 2022 Third qualifying round 2nd leg	Dinamo Zagreb (Croatia)	4–2 (6–3 agg.)	(Bulgaria) Ludogorets Razgrad	Zagreb, Croatia
20:00 UTC+2	Drmić 12'; Ristovski (yellow card) 21'; Mišić (yellow card) 21'; Oršić 27' (pen.), 44'; Perić (yellow card) 66'; Moharrami (yellow card) 70'; Petković 87' (pen.)	Report	Yankov (yellow card) 10' (yellow-red card) 17'; Plastun (yellow card) 18'; Rick (yellow card) 45+2' (yellow-red card) 72'; Despodov 45+4', 49' (pen.); Karničnik (red card) 86'	Stadium: Maksimir; Attendance: 13,658; Referee: Benoît Bastien (France)

=== UEFA Europa League ===
==== Qualifying rounds ====
18 August 2022 Play-off round 1st leg	Ludogorets Razgrad (Bulgaria)	1–0	(Lithuania) Žalgiris	Razgrad, Bulgaria
20:45 UTC+3	Tatomirović 2' (o.g.); Nedyalkov (yellow card) 45+1'; Yordanov (yellow card) 82'; Despodov (yellow card) 87'; Tissera (yellow card) 87'	Report	Buff (yellow card) 36'; Mikoliūnas (yellow card) 42'; Kazlauskas (yellow card) 78' (yellow-red card) 90+4'	Stadium: Huvepharma Arena; Attendance: 4,951; Referee: Ivan Kružliak (Slovakia)

25 August 2022 Play-off round 2nd leg	Žalgiris (Lithuania)	3–3 (a.e.t.) (3–4 agg.)	(Bulgaria) Ludogorets Razgrad	Vilnius, Lithuania
19:00 UTC+3	Ourega 1', (yellow card) 11'; Buff 16'; Oliveira 63'; Kyeremeh (yellow card) 89'; Pavelić (yellow card) 90+2'; Ljubisavljević (yellow card) 97'; Kuklys (yellow card) 120+1'	Report	Tissera (yellow card) 1', (goal) 8', 57'; Cicinho (yellow card) 11'; Tekpetey (yellow card) 31'; Piotrowski (yellow card) 40'; Nedyalkov (yellow card) 85'; Verdon 120' (pen.)	Stadium: LFF Stadium; Attendance: 4,601; Referee: Harm Osmers (Germany)

==== Group stage ====
Pos	Team	Pld	W	D	L	GF	GA	GD	Pts	Qualification
1	(Spain) Real Betis	6	5	1	0	12	4	+8	16	Advance to round of 16
2	(Italy) Roma	6	3	1	2	11	7	+4	10	Advance to knockout round play-offs
3	(Bulgaria) Ludogorets Razgrad	6	2	1	3	8	9	−1	7	Transfer to Europa Conference League
4	(Finland) HJK	6	0	1	5	2	13	−11	1	

Source: UEFA
Rules for classification: Group stage tiebreakers

8 September 2022 1	Ludogorets Razgrad (Bulgaria)	2–1	(Italy) Roma	Razgrad, Bulgaria
19:45 UTC+3	Show (yellow card) 38'; Nedyalkov (yellow card) 52'; Piotrowski (yellow card) 68'; Cauly 72'; Nonato 88'	Report	Shomurodov 86'	Stadium: Huvepharma Arena; Attendance: 10,011; Referee: Craig Pawson (England)

15 September 2022 2	Real Betis (Spain)	3–2	(Bulgaria) Ludogorets Razgrad	Seville, Spain
21:00 UTC+2	Henrique 25'; Joaquín 39'; Ruibal (yellow card) 45'; Akouokou (yellow card) 47'; Canales 59'; Guardado (yellow card) 74'; Bravo (yellow card) 90+3'	Report	Show (yellow card) 2'; Despodov (yellow card) 41', (goal) 45+1'; Tekpetey (yellow card) 53'; Nedyalkov (yellow card) 74'; Rick 74'	Stadium: Benito Villamarín; Attendance: 43,113; Referee: Andris Treimanis (Latvia)

6 October 2022 3	HJK (Finland)	1–1	(Bulgaria) Ludogorets Razgrad	Helsinki, Finland
19:45 UTC+3	Hostikka (yellow card) 51'; Hetemaj 55'; Raitala (yellow card) 58'; Boujellab (yellow card) 86'	Report	Tissera 10'; Piotrowski (yellow card) 80'	Stadium: Bolt Arena; Attendance: 9,751; Referee: Yevhen Aranovskyi (Ukraine)

13 October 2022 4	Ludogorets Razgrad (Bulgaria)	2–0	(Finland) HJK	Razgrad, Bulgaria
22:00 UTC+3	Gropper 39'; Cicinho (yellow card) 45+3'; Rick 64'	Report	Browne (yellow card) 34'; Raitala (yellow card) 55' (yellow-red card) 90+3'; Terho (yellow card) 73'; Hetemaj (yellow card) 83'	Stadium: Huvepharma Arena; Attendance: 4,623; Referee: Kristo Tohver (Estonia)

27 October 2022 5	Ludogorets Razgrad (Bulgaria)	0–1	(Spain) Real Betis	Razgrad, Bulgaria
19:45 UTC+3	Cicinho (yellow card) 38'; Verdon (yellow card) 45'	Report	Akouokou (yellow card) 9'; Fekir 56'	Stadium: Huvepharma Arena; Attendance: 9,487; Referee: Harald Lechner (Austria)

3 November 2022 6	Roma (Italy)	3–1	(Bulgaria) Ludogorets Razgrad	Rome, Italy
21:00 UTC+1	Volpato (yellow card) 49'; Pellegrini 56' (pen.), 65' (pen.); Zaniolo 85', (yellow card) 87'; Viña (yellow card) 88'	Report	Cicinho (yellow card) 15'; Rick 42', (yellow card) 79'; Thiago (yellow card) 62'; Nedyalkov (yellow card) 64'; Piotrowski (yellow card) 64'; Verdon (red card) 90'; Nonato (yellow card) 90'	Stadium: Stadio Olimpico; Attendance: 60,807; Referee: Nikola Dabanović (Montenegro)

=== UEFA Europa Conference League ===
==== Knockout phase ====
16 February 2023 KO round play-offs 1st leg	Ludogorets Razgrad (Bulgaria)	1–0	(Belgium) Anderlecht	Razgrad, Bulgaria
22:00 UTC+2	Thiago 9'; Show (yellow card) 69'; Padt (yellow card) 90+1'; Despodov (yellow card) 90+4'	Report	Slimani (yellow card) 45+3'; Murillo (yellow card) 63'; Debast (yellow card) 81'	Stadium: Huvepharma Arena; Attendance: 4,417; Referee: Duje Strukan (Croatia)

23 February 2023 KO round play-offs 2nd leg	Anderlecht (Belgium)	2–1 (a.e.t.) (2–2 agg.) (3–0 p)	(Bulgaria) Ludogorets Razgrad	Brussels, Belgium
18:45 UTC+1	Russo 13' (o.g.); Stroeykens (yellow card) 16'; Refaelov (yellow card) 56'; Verschaeren 68'; Boeckx (yellow card) 90+2'; Arnstad (yellow card) 93'; Sardella (yellow card) 120+3'	Report	Naressi (yellow card) 16'; Piotrowski (yellow card) 26' (yellow-red card) 97'; Russo (yellow card) 56'; Thiago 71'; Pipa (yellow card) 84'; Tissera (yellow card) 90+6'	Stadium: Constant Vanden Stock Stadium; Attendance: 15,822; Referee: Daniel Siebert (Germany)
	Penalties
	Refaelov (penalty scored); Vertonghen (penalty scored); Verschaeren (penalty scored)		(penalty missed) Pipa; (penalty missed) Yankov; (penalty missed) Naressi

== Squad statistics ==
As of match played 4 December 2022

=== Appearances and goals ===
No.	Pos	Nat	Player	Total		First League		Bulgarian Cup		Bulgarian Supercup		Champions League		Europa League		Europa Conference League	
No.	Pos	Nat	Player	Apps	Goals	Apps	Goals	Apps	Goals	Apps	Goals	Apps	Goals	Apps	Goals	Apps	Goals
1	GK	(Netherlands) NED	Sergio Padt	26	0	15	0	0	0	1	0	5	0	5	0	0	0
3	DF	(Bulgaria) BUL	Anton Nedyalkov	27	0	10+2	0	0	0	1	0	6	0	8	0	0	0
4	DF	(Bulgaria) BUL	Cicinho	26	1	8+5	1	0+1	0	1	0	4	0	7	0	0	0
5	DF	(Bulgaria) BUL	Georgi Terziev	11	1	6+2	1	1	0	0	0	0+1	0	0+1	0	0	0
6	MF	(Poland) POL	Jakub Piotrowski	26	2	10+4	2	0+1	0	1	0	2	0	8	0	0	0
8	MF	(Portugal) POR	Claude Gonçalves	8	0	1+4	0	1	0	0	0	1	0	0+1	0	0	0
9	FW	(Brazil) BRA	Thiago	31	4	6+10	3	1	0	0+1	0	1+4	1	6+2	0	0	0
10	FW	(Argentina) ARG	Matías Tissera	30	14	12+6	10	0+1	0	1	0	0+3	1	3+4	3	0	0
11	FW	(Bulgaria) BUL	Kiril Despodov	26	10	9+5	5	0	0	1	2	3+3	2	4+1	1	0	0
12	GK	(Croatia) CRO	Simon Sluga	9	0	3	0	1	0	0	0	1+1	0	3	0	0	0
14	DF	(Israel) ISR	Denny Gropper	17	1	9+1	0	0	0	0	0	0+1	0	3+3	1	0	0
15	DF	(Brazil) BRA	Pedro Henrique	1	0	0	0	1	0	0	0	0	0	0	0	0	0
16	DF	(Norway) NOR	Aslak Fonn Witry	17	0	9+2	0	1	0	0	0	0	0	5	0	0	0
17	FW	(Guinea-Bissau) GBS	Jorginho	6	1	1+2	1	0	0	0	0	0+1	0	0+2	0	0	0
20	MF	(Brazil) BRA	Nonato	16	1	5+4	0	1	0	0	0	0	0	0+6	1	0	0
21	DF	(Slovenia) SLO	Žan Karničnik	9	0	5	0	0	0	0	0	2+1	0	0+1	0	0	0
23	MF	(Angola) ANG	Show	24	1	7+5	1	1	0	1	0	4	0	4+2	0	0	0
24	DF	(Benin) BEN	Olivier Verdon	27	2	12	1	0	0	1	0	6	0	8	1	0	0
30	MF	(Brazil) BRA	Pedro Naressi	11	0	5+2	0	0	0	0	0	0	0	2+2	0	0	0
32	DF	(Ukraine) UKR	Ihor Plastun	23	0	13+2	0	0	0	1	0	6	0	1	0	0	0
37	FW	(Ghana) GHA	Bernard Tekpetey	32	9	11+6	8	1	0	1	0	4+1	1	8	0	0	0
58	DF	(Bulgaria) BUL	Dimitar Iliev	1	1	0	0	0+1	1	0	0	0	0	0	0	0	0
64	MF	(Bulgaria) BUL	Dominik Yankov	10	0	2+3	0	1	0	0	0	2+2	0	0	0	0	0
73	FW	(Brazil) BRA	Rick	32	6	15+2	2	0+1	1	0+1	0	4+2	0	4+3	3	0	0
75	MF	(Bulgaria) BUL	Petar Georgiev	1	0	0	0	0	0	0	0	0	0	0+1	0	0	0
82	MF	(Bulgaria) BUL	Ivan Yordanov	12	1	6+1	1	1	0	0	0	1+1	0	2	0	0	0
90	FW	(Bulgaria) BUL	Spas Delev	26	2	4+9	2	0	0	0+1	0	1+5	0	1+5	0	0	0
95	MF	(Brazil) BRA	Cauly	29	7	11+5	5	0	0	1	0	4+1	1	6+1	1	0	0
Players away from the club on loan:
Players who appeared for Ludogorets Razgrad that left during the season:
7	MF	(Brazil) BRA	Alex Santana	7	2	3	1	0	0	0	0	4	1	0	0	0	0
19	FW	(Cyprus) CYP	Pieros Sotiriou	7	4	0+2	1	0	0	0	0	5	3	0	0	0	0

=== Goalscorers ===
Place	Position	Nation	Number	Name	First League	Bulgarian Cup	Bulgarian Supercup	Champions League	Europa League	Europa Conference League	Total
1	FW	(Argentina)	10	Matías Tissera	10	0	0	1	3	0	14
2	FW	(Ghana)	37	Bernard Tekpetey	8	1	0	1	0	0	10
2	FW	(Bulgaria)	11	Kiril Despodov	5	0	2	2	1	0	10
4	MF	(Brazil)	95	Cauly	5	0	0	1	1	0	7
5	FW	(Brazil)	73	Rick	2	1	0	0	3	0	6
6	FW	(Brazil)	9	Thiago	3	1	0	1	0	0	5
7	FW	(Cyprus)	19	Pieros Sotiriou	1	0	0	3	0	0	4
8	MF	(Bulgaria)	90	Spas Delev	2	0	0	0	0	0	2
8	MF	(Poland)	6	Jakub Piotrowski	2	0	0	0	0	0	2
8	MF	(Brazil)	7	Alex Santana	1	0	0	1	0	0	2
8	DF	(Benin)	24	Olivier Verdon	1	0	0	0	1	0	2
8				Own goal	1	0	0	0	1	0	2
13	DF	(Brazil)	4	Cicinho	1	0	0	0	0	0	1
13	DF	(Bulgaria)	5	Georgi Terziev	1	0	0	0	0	0	1
13	MF	(Guinea-Bissau)	17	Jorginho	1	0	0	0	0	0	1
13	MF	(Bulgaria)	82	Ivan Yordanov	1	0	0	0	0	0	1
13	MF	(Angola)	23	Show	1	0	0	0	0	0	1
13	DF	(Bulgaria)	58	Dimitar Iliev	0	1	0	0	0	0	1
13	MF	(Brazil)	20	Nonato	0	0	0	0	1	0	1
13	DF	(Israel)	14	Denny Gropper	0	0	0	0	1	0	1
Totals					46	2	2	10	12	0	72

=== Clean sheets ===
Place	Position	Nation	Number	Name	First League	Bulgarian Cup	Bulgarian Supercup	Champions League	Europa League	Europa Conference League	Total
1	GK	(Netherlands)	1	Sergio Padt	7	0	0	3	1	0	11
2	GK	(Croatia)	12	Simon Sluga	2	1	0	0	1	0	4
Totals					9	1	0	3	2	0	15

=== Disciplinary record ===
Number	Nation	Position	Name	First League		Bulgarian Cup		Bulgarian Supercup		Champions League		Europa League		Europa Conference League		Total	
Number	Nation	Position	Name	Yellow card	Red card	Yellow card	Red card	Yellow card	Red card	Yellow card	Red card	Yellow card	Red card	Yellow card	Red card	Yellow card	Red card
1	(Netherlands)	GK	Sergio Padt	2	0	0	0	0	0	0	0	0	0	0	0	2	0
3	(Bulgaria)	DF	Anton Nedyalkov	1	0	0	0	0	0	0	0	5	0	0	0	6	0
4	(Bulgaria)	DF	Cicinho	1	1	0	0	1	0	2	0	4	0	0	0	8	1
5	(Bulgaria)	DF	Georgi Terziev	2	0	0	0	0	0	0	0	0	0	0	0	2	0
6	(Poland)	MF	Jakub Piotrowski	4	0	1	0	1	0	0	0	4	0	0	0	10	0
8	(Portugal)	MF	Claude Gonçalves	0	0	1	0	0	0	0	0	0	0	0	0	1	0
9	(Brazil)	FW	Thiago	1	0	1	0	1	0	0	0	1	0	0	0	4	0
10	(Argentina)	FW	Matías Tissera	2	0	0	0	0	0	0	0	2	0	0	0	4	0
11	(Bulgaria)	FW	Kiril Despodov	2	0	0	0	0	0	2	0	2	0	0	0	6	0
14	(Israel)	DF	Denny Gropper	3	0	0	0	0	0	0	0	0	0	0	0	3	0
20	(Brazil)	MF	Nonato	0	0	0	0	0	0	0	0	1	0	0	0	1	0
21	(Slovenia)	DF	Žan Karničnik	0	0	0	0	0	0	0	1	0	0	0	0	0	1
23	(Angola)	MF	Show	1	0	0	0	0	0	4	1	2	0	0	0	7	1
24	(Benin)	DF	Olivier Verdon	3	0	1	0	1	0	1	0	1	1	0	0	7	1
30	(Brazil)	MF	Pedrinho	2	0	0	0	0	0	0	0	0	0	0	0	2	0
32	(Ukraine)	DF	Ihor Plastun	1	0	0	0	1	0	1	0	0	0	0	0	3	0
37	(Ghana)	FW	Bernard Tekpetey	3	0	0	0	1	0	2	0	2	0	0	0	8	0
58	(Bulgaria)	DF	Dimitar Iliev	0	0	1	0	0	0	0	0	0	0	0	0	1	0
64	(Bulgaria)	MF	Dominik Yankov	0	0	0	0	0	0	2	1	0	0	0	0	2	1
73	(Brazil)	FW	Rick	1	0	0	0	1	0	4	1	1	0	0	0	7	1
82	(Bulgaria)	MF	Ivan Yordanov	2	0	0	0	0	0	0	0	1	0	0	0	3	0
95	(Brazil)	MF	Cauly	3	0	0	0	0	0	0	0	0	0	0	0	3	0
Players away on loan:
Players who left Ludogorets Razgrad during the season:
7	(Brazil)	MF	Alex Santana	0	0	0	0	0	0	1	0	0	0	0	0	1	0
			Totals	34	1	5	0	7	0	19	3	26	1	0	0	91	5
