= Dimitar Iliev =

Dimitar Iliev may refer to:

- Dimitar Iliev (footballer, born 1988), Bulgarian football forward for Lokomotiv Plovdiv
- Dimitar Iliev (footballer, born 1986), Bulgarian football defender for Montana
- Dimitar Iliev (footballer, born 1999), Bulgarian football defender for Ludogorets Razgrad
