= Pedro Naressi =

Brazilian footballer

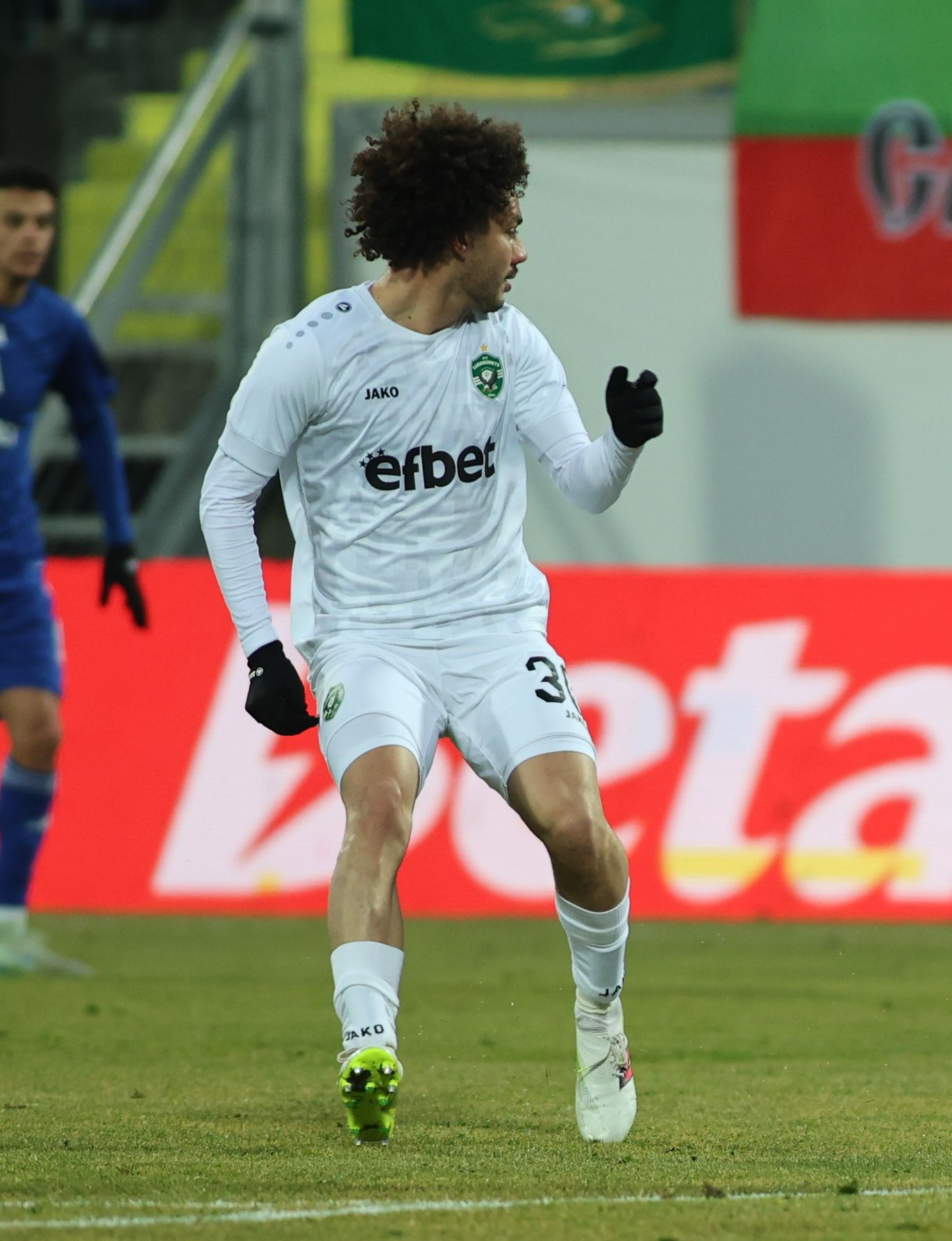

Personal information
- Full name: Pedro Henrique Naressi Machado
- Date of birth: 10 January 1998 (age 28)
- Place of birth: São José dos Campos, Brazil
- Height: 1.78 m (5 ft 10 in)
- Position: Defensive midfielder

Team information
- Current team: Servette
- Number: 6

Youth career
- 2004–2006: DAEC
- 2007–2008: Atleta Cidadão
- 2009: Joseense
- 2010–2012: São José
- 2013: Mogi Mirim
- 2014–2015: Red Bull Brasil

Senior career*
Years	Team	Apps	(Gls)
2015–2019	Red Bull Brasil	1	(0)
2016	→ Joseense (loan)	14	(1)
2019–2020	Red Bull Bragantino	14	(1)
2020–2022	Ceará	25	(3)
2022	→ Sport Recife (loan)	22	(1)
2022–2026	Ludogorets Razgrad	97	(4)
2026–	Servette	8	(0)
- * Club domestic league appearances and goals as of 28 September 2026

Pedro Henrique Naressi Machado (born 10 January 1998) is a Brazilian professional footballer who plays as a defensive midfielder for Servette.

== Career ==
Naressi came through the youth ranks at Red Bull Brasil and was a part of the squad which played in 2019 Campeonato Paulista He became part of the Red Bull Bragantino squad when Red Bull Brasil merged with Clube Atlético Bragantino in April 2019.

Naressi made his national league debut in the first game of the 2019 Campeonato Brasileiro Série B season against Brasil de Pelotas on 26 April 2019.

On 2 September 2022, he signed with Bulgarian First League club Ludogorets Razgrad.

After 4 years in Bulgaria, Naressi joined Swiss side Servette FC in the summer 2026, on a two-year contract.

== Career statistics ==
As of match played 28 September 2026

Appearances and goals by club, season and competition
Club	Season	League			State league		National cup		Continental		Other		Total	
Club	Season	Division	Apps	Goals	Apps	Goals	Apps	Goals	Apps	Goals	Apps	Goals	Apps	Goals
Red Bull Bragantino	2016	Série C	0	0	0	0	8	0	—		—		8	0
Red Bull Bragantino	2017	Série D	0	0	1	0	0	0	—		—		1	0
Red Bull Bragantino	Total		0	0	1	0	8	0	—		—		9	0
Joseense (loan)	2016	Paulista A3	—		14	1	—		—		—		14	1
Red Bull Bragantino	2019	Série B	11	0	1	0	0	0	—		—		12	0
Red Bull Bragantino	2020	Série A	0	0	3	0	0	0	—		—		3	0
Red Bull Bragantino	Total		11	0	4	0	0	0	—		—		15	0
Ceará	2020	Série A	13	2	0	0	1	0	—		—		14	2
Ceará	2021	Série A	10	2	2	0	1	0	1 (Note: Appearance in Copa Sudamericana)	0	9 (Note: Appearances in Copa do Nordeste)	0	23	2
Ceará	Total		23	4	2	0	2	0	1	0	9	0	37	4
Sport Recife (loan)	Série B	Série B	18	0	4	1	1	0	—		4	1	26	2
Ludogorets Razgrad	2022–23	Bulgarian First League	22	0	—		4	0	10 (Note: Four appearances in UEFA Champions League, four appearances in UEFA Europa League, two appearances in UEFA Europa Conference League)	0	—		36	0
Ludogorets Razgrad	2023–24	Bulgarian First League	29	2	—		6	0	16 (Note: Four appearances in UEFA Champions League, four appearances in UEFA Europa League, eight appearances in UEFA Europa Conference League)	0	1 (Note: Appearances in Bulgarian Super Cup)	0	52	2
Ludogorets Razgrad	2024–25	Bulgarian First League	25	2	—		1	0	13 (Note: Appearances in UEFA Champions League)	0	1 (Note: Appearances in Bulgarian Supercup)	0	40	2
Ludogorets Razgrad	2025–26	Bulgarian First League	21	0	—		1	0	15 (Note: Appearances in UEFA Champions League)	0	1 (Note: Appearances in Bulgarian Supercup)	0	38	0
Ludogorets Razgrad	Total		97	4	—		12	0	54	0	3	0	166	4
Servette	2026–27	Swiss Super League	8	0	—		0	0	—		—		8	0
Career total			157	8	25	2	23	0	55	0	16	1	276	11

== Honours ==
Red Bull Bragantino

- Campeonato Brasileiro Série B: 2019

Ludogorets Razgrad

- Bulgarian First League: 2022–23, 2023–24
- Bulgarian Cup: 2022–23
- Bulgarian Supercup: 2023
