= Sergio Padt =

Dutch footballer (born 1990)

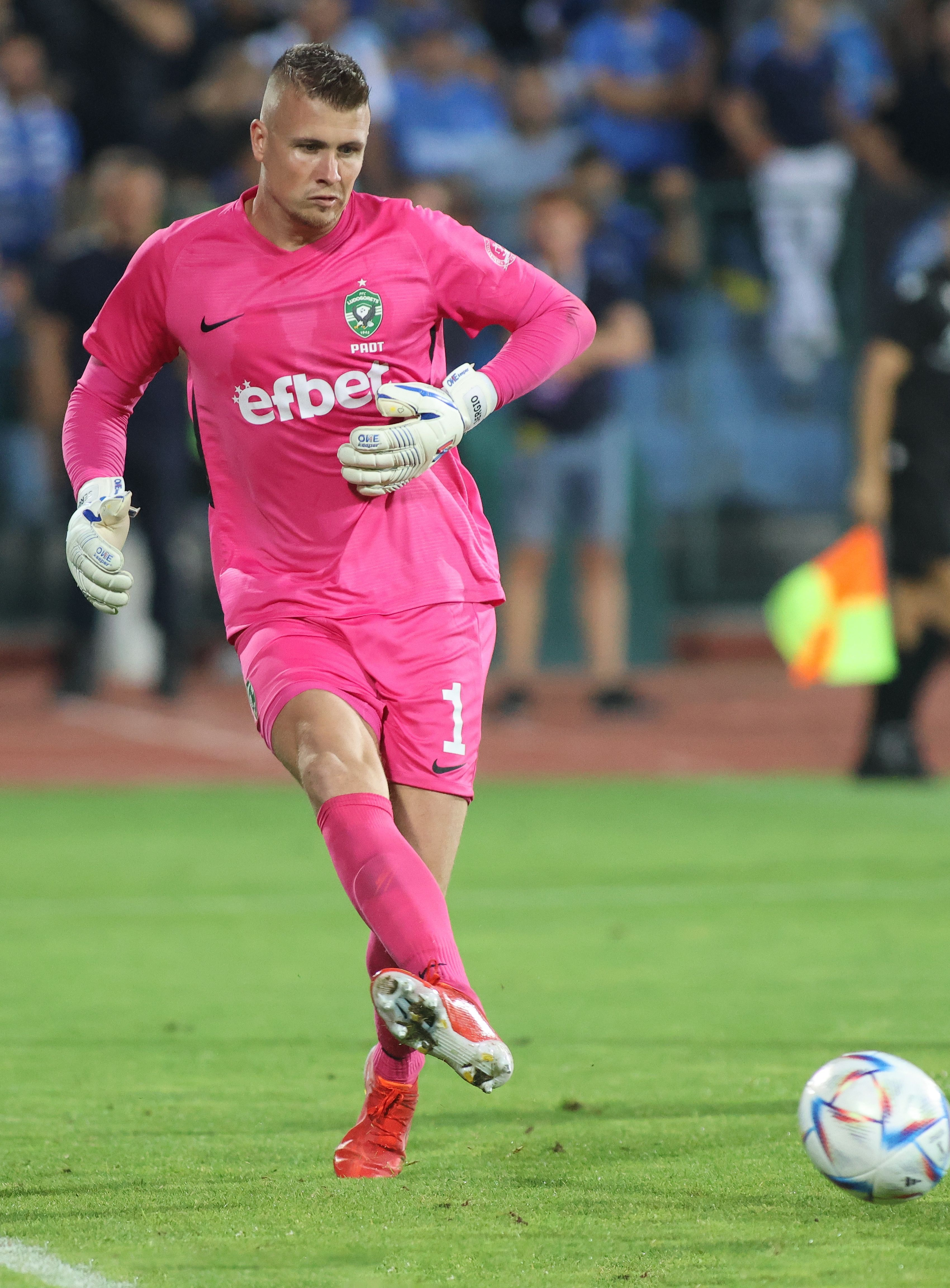
- Padt with Ludogorets Razgrad in 2022

Personal information
- Full name: Sergio Vincenzo Roberto Padt
- Date of birth: 6 June 1990 (age 36)
- Place of birth: Haarlem, Netherlands
- Height: 1.96 m (6 ft 5 in)
- Position: Goalkeeper

Team information
- Current team: Utrecht
- Number: 22

Youth career
- 1999–2003: RKSV Pancratius
- 2003–2007: SV Hoofddorp
- 2007–2009: Ajax

Senior career*
Years	Team	Apps	(Gls)
2009–2011	Ajax	0	(0)
2010	→ Haarlem (loan)	1	(0)
2010–2011	→ Go Ahead Eagles (loan)	34	(0)
2011–2014	Gent	55	(0)
2014–2021	Groningen	235	(0)
2021–2026	Ludogorets Razgrad	98	(0)
2026–	Utrecht	1	(0)

International career
2006–2007	Netherlands U-17	6	(0)
2010–2012	Netherlands U-21	5	(0)
- * Club domestic league appearances and goals as of 22:00, 18 October 2026 (UTC)

Sergio Vincenzo Roberto Padt (born 6 June 1990) is a Dutch professional footballer who plays as a goalkeeper for Eredivisie club Utrecht.

Padt previously played on loan from Ajax for HFC Haarlem in the Eerste Divisie, and later for Go Ahead Eagles and in the Belgian Pro League for Gent. He represented the Netherlands U-17 team at the 2007 UEFA European Under-17 Football Championship.

== Club career ==
=== Ajax ===
Prior to joining Ajax, Padt played for R.K.S.V. Pancratius and SV Hoofddorp. On 28 March 2008, he signed his first contract for Ajax.

=== Haarlem ===
In early 2010, Padt was sent out on loan to Eerste Divisie side HFC Haarlem to gain more experience. He made his debut on 22 January 2010 in a 3–0 away loss to Excelsior Rotterdam. It would turn out to be his only match for Haarlem because the club soon afterward went into bankruptcy, meaning he had to return to Ajax for the remainder of the 2009–10 season.

=== Go Ahead Eagles ===
For the 2010–11 season, Padt signed a new contract with Ajax and was again sent out on loan, this time to Go Ahead Eagles. On 16 August 2010, he made his Eerste Divisie debut for the club in the first league match against Sparta Rotterdam. Padt became the first keeper at his start in Deventer.

=== Gent ===
On 30 June 2011, Padt came to an agreement with AA Gent, and on 6 July, the transfer was completed. He signed his contract until 2013 on that day. On 27 November 2011, he made his official debut in the Belgian Pro League for Gent in the 2–0 victory against RC Genk.

=== Groningen ===
On 22 June 2014, it was announced that Padt would sign a deal with FC Groningen. He helped the Green-White Army win the KNVB Cup in 2014–15 against defending champions PEC Zwolle. It was their first major trophy and they qualified for the UEFA Europa League.

=== Ludogorets Razgrad ===
In early 2021, it was reported that he had signed a pre-contract with the Bulgarian champions Ludogorets Razgrad and joined the club officially on 2 June 2021.

On 7 September 2026, Padt agreed to a mutual termination of his contract with Ludogorets, after having played 152 matches for the Bulgarian side, during which he achieved 67 clean sheets.

=== Utrecht ===
On 11 September 2026, Padt signed a contract with Utrecht until June 2028.

== International career ==
Padt represented the Netherlands U-17 team at the 2007 UEFA European Under-17 Football Championship. Padt was in the starting line-up for all three group games against Belgium, Iceland, and England, but the team failed to qualify for the second round.

Since 2009, Padt has been playing for the Netherlands U-21 team, although Tim Krul is first-choice keeper in the squad for now. He received his first call-up from manager Cor Pot for a 2011 European U-21 Championship qualification match against Finland. On 18 May 2010, Padt made his debut for the U-21 side in a match against Portugal.

He was called up to the senior Netherlands squad for friendlies against Slovakia and Italy in May 2018, but remained on the bench for both matches.

== Personal life ==
Padt's full name, Sergio Vincenzo Roberto Padt, reflects his family background: his mother, Lorena Tomè, is half-Italian, and he was named after her father Vincenzo; his middle name Roberto comes from his paternal grandfather, Robert, with the Italian form chosen for aesthetic reasons. His father is Jeffrey Padt. His parents never married, and he has no siblings. He grew up in Osdorp, a neighbourhood in west Amsterdam, where his parents also live, and has described the city as his home.

Padt has been in a relationship with Melanie Sorber since 2009. When he joined Ludogorets Razgrad in 2021, the family relocated to Razgrad, Bulgaria. He has described the adjustment as initially difficult—his children came home from school in tears—but noted that they subsequently settled to the point of speaking fluent Bulgarian and considering Razgrad their home. When he jokingly suggested returning to the Netherlands, they began crying again. He purchased a house in Amsterdam during this period, however, retaining a base there during international breaks.

=== Train incident ===
On 23 September 2018, following a 3–1 defeat against AZ, Padt was arrested at Kropswolde railway station while travelling home without a valid ticket. He was about to be issued a fine, disagreed with this, and an altercation ensued involving two Arriva employees. He spent a night in custody and the following day handed the captain's armband to defender Mike te Wierik.

At trial in January 2019, Padt admitted he had been drinking four to six mixed drinks on an empty stomach before the incident and that the frustration of the defeat had contributed to his behaviour. He admitted to insult and threatening conduct but denied assault, claiming he had only pushed away a conductor's finger which had come close to his face; a witness he brought to court stated that Padt had struck the conductor with an open hand. Padt and his witness also both claimed the station's ticket machine had been broken, with Padt saying he had photographed it. The court found insult, assault and threatening behaviour proven and sentenced him to 50 hours of community service—the prosecution had sought 70—with 25 days' imprisonment as an alternative. It also emerged during the hearing that Padt had a prior conviction: a €250 fine for violating a prohibition on assembly in Amsterdam.

Despite the incident and subsequent conviction, Padt retained his place in the FC Groningen starting eleven. He was not called up for the Netherlands national team in the period that followed.

== Career statistics ==
=== Club ===
As of 18 October 2026

Appearances and goals by club, season and competition
Club	Season	League			National cup		Europe		Other		Total	
Club	Season	Division	Club	League	Apps	Goals	Apps	Goals	Apps	Goals	Apps	Goals
Haarlem	2009–10	Eerste Divisie	1	0	0	0	—		—		1	0
Go Ahead Eagles	2010–11	Eerste Divisie	34	0	2	0	—		2 (Note: Appearances in the Eerste Divisie promotion play-offs)	0	38	0
Gent	2011–12	Belgian Pro League	21	0	0	0	—		—		21	0
Gent	2012–13	Belgian Pro League	23	0	2	0	3 (Note: Appearances in the Europa League)	0	0	0	28	0
Gent	2013–14	Belgian Pro League	11	0	3	0	—		0	0	14	0
Gent	Total		55	0	5	0	3	0	2	0	63	0
Groningen	2014–15	Eredivisie	32	0	6	0	2	0	0	0	40	0
Groningen	2015–16	Eredivisie	36	0	2	0	6	0	1 (Note: Appearance in the Johan Cruyff Shield)	0	45	0
Groningen	2016–17	Eredivisie	36	0	2	0	—		0	0	38	0
Groningen	2017–18	Eredivisie	34	0	2	0	—		0	0	36	0
Groningen	2018–19	Eredivisie	36	0	1	0	—		0	0	37	0
Groningen	2019–20	Eredivisie	26	0	1	0	—		0	0	27	0
Groningen	2020–21	Eredivisie	35	0	1	0	—		0	0	36	0
Groningen	Total		235	0	15	0	8	0	1	0	259	0
Ludogorets Razgrad	2021–22	First League	19	0	1	0	2	0	0	0	22	0
Ludogorets Razgrad	2022–23	First League	32	0	0	0	13 (Note: Five appearances in UEFA Champions League, two appearances in UEFA Europa League, six appearances in UEFA Europa Conference League)	0	1	0	46	0
Ludogorets Razgrad	2023–24	First League	17	0	2	0	11 (Note: Four appearances in UEFA Champions League, two appearances in UEFA Europa League, five appearances in UEFA Europa Conference League)	0	1	0	31	0
Ludogorets Razgrad	2024–25	First League	19	0	3	0	9 (Note: Three appearances in UEFA Champions League, six appearances in UEFA Europa League)	0	1	0	32	0
Ludogorets Razgrad	2025–26	First League	11	0	1	0	7 (Note: Two appearances in UEFA Champions League, five appearances in UEFA Europa League)	0	1	0	20	0
Ludogorets Razgrad	Total		98	0	7	0	42	0	4	0	151	0
Utrecht	2026–27	Eredivisie	1	0	0	0	—		—		1	0
Career total			424	0	29	0	53	0	7	0	513	0

== Honours ==
Groningen

- KNVB Cup: 2014–15

Ludogorets Razgrad

- Bulgarian First League: (4) 2021–22, 2022–23, 2023–24, 2024-25
- Bulgarian Supercup: (4) 2022, 2023, 2024, 2025
- Bulgarian Cup: (2) 2022–23, 2024–25
