= Denny Gropper =

Israeli footballer (born 1999)

Personal information
- Date of birth: 16 March 1999 (age 27)
- Place of birth: Haifa, Israel
- Position: Left-back

Team information
- Current team: Maccabi Tel Aviv

Youth career
- 2010–2015: Maccabi Haifa
- 2015–2017: Hapoel Haifa
- 2017–2018: Ironi Nesher

Senior career*
Years	Team	Apps	(Gls)
2018–2019	Hapoel Afula	30	(4)
2019–2022	Hapoel Tel Aviv	56	(2)
2022–2025	Ludogorets Razgrad	42	(0)
2025–	Maccabi Tel Aviv	2	(0)

International career^{‡}
2019–2020	Israel U21	8	(0)
2022–	Israel	10	(0)
- * Club domestic league appearances and goals as of 26 May 2025 ‡ National team caps and goals as of 19:00, 13 November 2025 (UTC)

Denny Gropper (or Danny Gruper, Hebrew: דני גרופר; born 16 March 1999) is an Israeli professional footballer who plays as a left-back for Maccabi Tel Aviv and the Israel national team.

== Early life ==
Gruper was born in Haifa, Israel, to a family of Ashkenazi Jewish descent. His maternal uncle is Israeli former international footballer Ronny Rosenthal.

== Club career ==
Gropper joined the Maccabi Haifa youth department as a child. In 2015 he moved to the youth departments of Hapoel Haifa and Ironi Nesher. In 2018 he first appeared in a senior team when he signed for one season at Hapoel Afula, where he impressed with a breakout season when he scored 4 goals in 30 league games in the National League. In May 2019 he signed for three seasons at the Israeli Hapoel Tel Aviv club. In March 2022 Gropper signed a contract with Bulgarian champions Ludogorets Razgrad.

== Career statistics ==
As of match played 26 May 2025

Appearances and goals by club, season and competition
Club	Season	League			National cup		League cup		Europe		Other		Total	
Club	Season	Division	Apps	Goals	Apps	Goals	Apps	Goals	Apps	Goals	Apps	Goals	Apps	Goals
Hapoel Afula	2018–19	Liga Leumit	30	4	5	1	—		—		—		35	5
Hapoel Tel Aviv	2019–20	Israeli Premier League	21	1	1	0	4	0	—		—		26	1
Hapoel Tel Aviv	2020–21	Israeli Premier League	29	1	4	0	4	0	—		—		26	1
Hapoel Tel Aviv	2021–22	Israeli Premier League	6	1	—		—		—		—		6	1
Hapoel Tel Aviv	Total		56	3	5	0	8	0	—		—		69	3
Ludogorets Razgrad	2021–22	Bulgarian First League	4	0	—		—		—		—		4	0
Ludogorets Razgrad	2022–23	Bulgarian First League	15	0	1	0	—		8 (Note: One appearance in UEFA Champions League, six appearances and one goal in UEFA Europa League, one appearance in UEFA Europa Conference League)	1	0	0	24	1
Ludogorets Razgrad	2023–24	Bulgarian First League	4	0	3	0	—		0	0	0	0	7	0
Ludogorets Razgrad	2024–25	Bulgarian First League	19	0	2	0	—		6	0	1	0	28	0
Ludogorets Razgrad	Total		42	0	6	0	—		14	1	1	0	63	1
Ludogorets Razgrad II	2022–23	Bulgarian Second League	3	0	—		—		—		—		3	0
Ludogorets Razgrad II	2023–24	Bulgarian Second League	2	0	—		—		—		—		2	0
Ludogorets Razgrad II	2024–25	Bulgarian Second League	1	0	—		—		—		—		1	0
Ludogorets Razgrad II	Total		6	0	—		—		—		—		6	0
Maccabi Tel Aviv	2025–26	0	0	0	0	0	0	0	0	—		0	0	
Maccabi Tel Aviv	Total		0	0	0	0	0	0	—		—		0	0
Career total			105	6	14	1	8	0	14	1	1	0	143	8

== Honours ==
Ludogorets Razgrad

- First Professional Football League (Bulgaria): 2021–22, 2022–23, 2023–24, 2024–25
- Bulgarian Cup: 2022–23, 2024–25
- Bulgarian Supercup: 2022, 2023, 2024
