= Aslak Fonn Witry =

Norwegian footballer (born 1996)

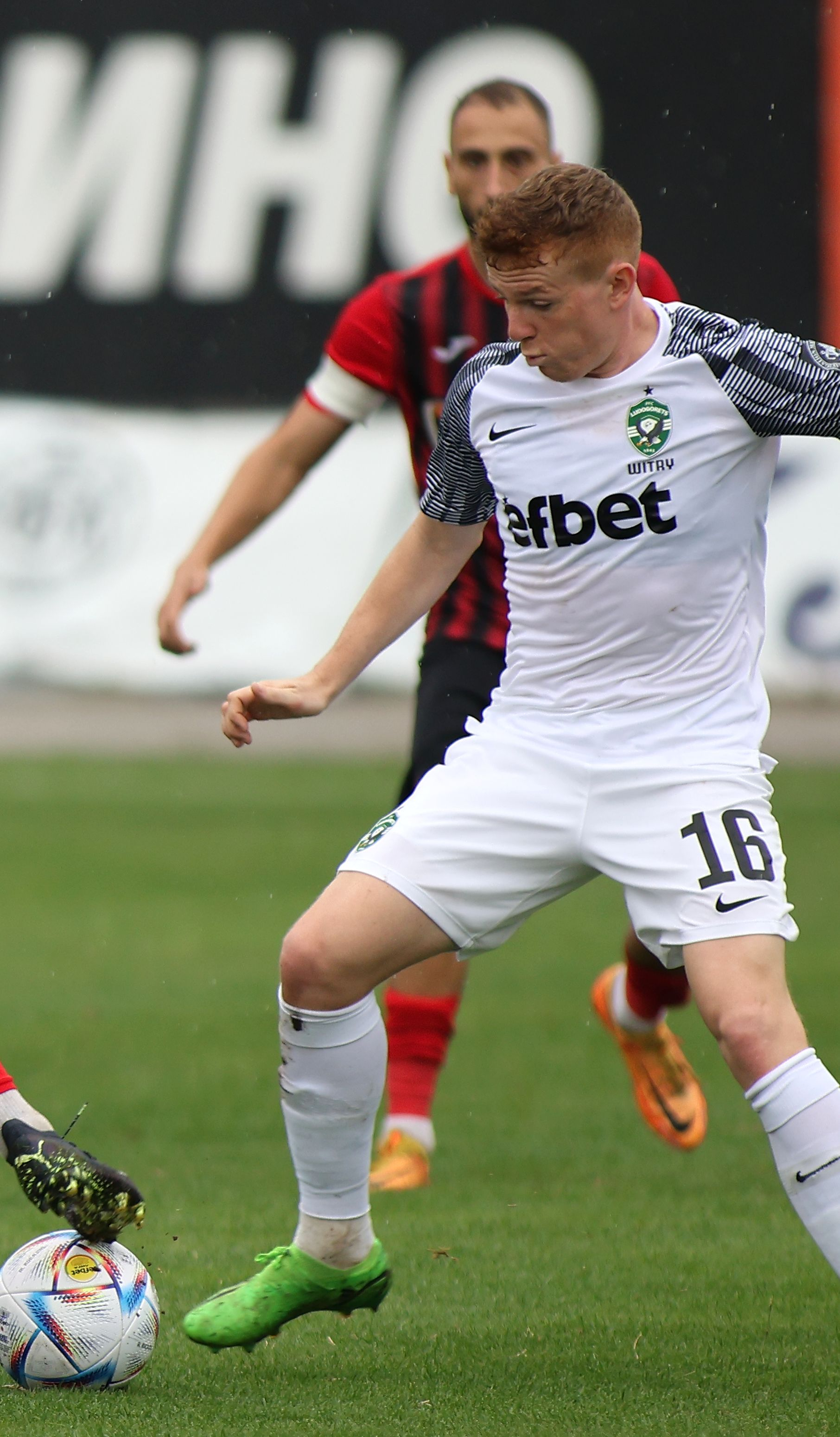
- Witry with Ludogorets Razgrad

Personal information
- Date of birth: 10 March 1996 (age 30)
- Place of birth: Trondheim, Norway
- Height: 1.78 m (5 ft 10 in)
- Position: Right-back

Team information
- Current team: Rosenborg
- Number: 16

Youth career
- –2012: Strindheim IL
- 2012–2014: Rosenborg

Senior career*
Years	Team	Apps	(Gls)
2015–2018	Ranheim	90	(5)
2019–2021	Djurgårdens IF	65	(10)
2021–2022	AZ	33	(1)
2022–2025	Ludogorets Razgrad	74	(6)
2025–	Rosenborg	31	(3)

International career
2014	Norway U18	10	(0)
- * Club domestic league appearances and goals as of 22 November 2026

Aslak Fonn Witry (born 10 March 1996) is a Norwegian footballer who plays as a defender for Norwegian club Rosenborg.

== Career ==
Fonn Witry started his career at Rosenborg as a junior. Fonn Witry signed with Ranheim in 2015.

Fonn Witry made his debut for Ranheim in Eliteserien in a 4–1 win against Stabæk.

On 20 December 2018, he signed for Djurgårdens IF in Allsvenskan. He got his debut in the first game of the 2019 season against GIF Sundsvall on 1 April.

On 30 August 2022, he signed for Ludogorets Razgrad of the Bulgarian First League.

== Career statistics ==
=== Club ===
As of match played 22 November 2026

Appearances and goals by club, season and competition
Club	Season	League			National cup		Continental		Total	
Club	Season	Division	Apps	Goals	Apps	Goals	Apps	Goals	Apps	Goals
Rosenborg	2014	Tippeligaen	0	0	1	0	–		1	0
Ranheim	2015	OBOS-ligaen	7	0	1	0	–		8	0
Ranheim	2016	OBOS-ligaen	27	1	2	0	–		29	1
Ranheim	2017	OBOS-ligaen	30	2	3	0	–		33	2
Ranheim	2018	Eliteserien	26	2	2	0	–		28	2
Ranheim	Total		90	5	8	0	0	0	98	5
Djurgården	2019	Allsvenskan	25	3	4	1	–		29	4
Djurgården	2020	Allsvenskan	26	2	3	0	–		29	2
Djurgården	2021	Allsvenskan	8	3	4	2	–		12	5
Djurgården	Total		59	8	11	3	0	0	70	11
AZ	2021–22	Eredivisie	31	1	4	0	8	0	43	1
AZ	2022–23	Eredivisie	2	0	0	0	2	0	4	0
AZ	Total		33	1	4	0	10	0	47	1
Ludogorets Razgrad	2022–23	Bulgarian First League	24	0	5	0	7	0	36	0
Ludogorets Razgrad	2023–24	Bulgarian First League	23	5	4	0	16	0	43	5
Ludogorets Razgrad	2024–25	Bulgarian First League	27	1	5	0	13	1	45	2
Ludogorets Razgrad	Total		74	6	14	0	36	1	124	7
Rosenborg	2025	Eliteserien	9	1	1	0	6	0	16	1
Rosenborg	2026	Eliteserien	22	2	3	2	–		25	4
Rosenborg	Total		31	3	4	2	6	0	41	5
Career total			287	23	42	5	52	1	381	29

== Honours ==
Djurgårdens IF

- Allsvenskan: 2019

Ludogorets Razgrad

- Bulgarian First League: 2022–23, 2023–24, 2024–25
- Bulgarian Cup: 2022–23, 2024–25
- Bulgarian Supercup: 2023, 2024
