= Show (footballer) =

Angolan footballer (born 1999)

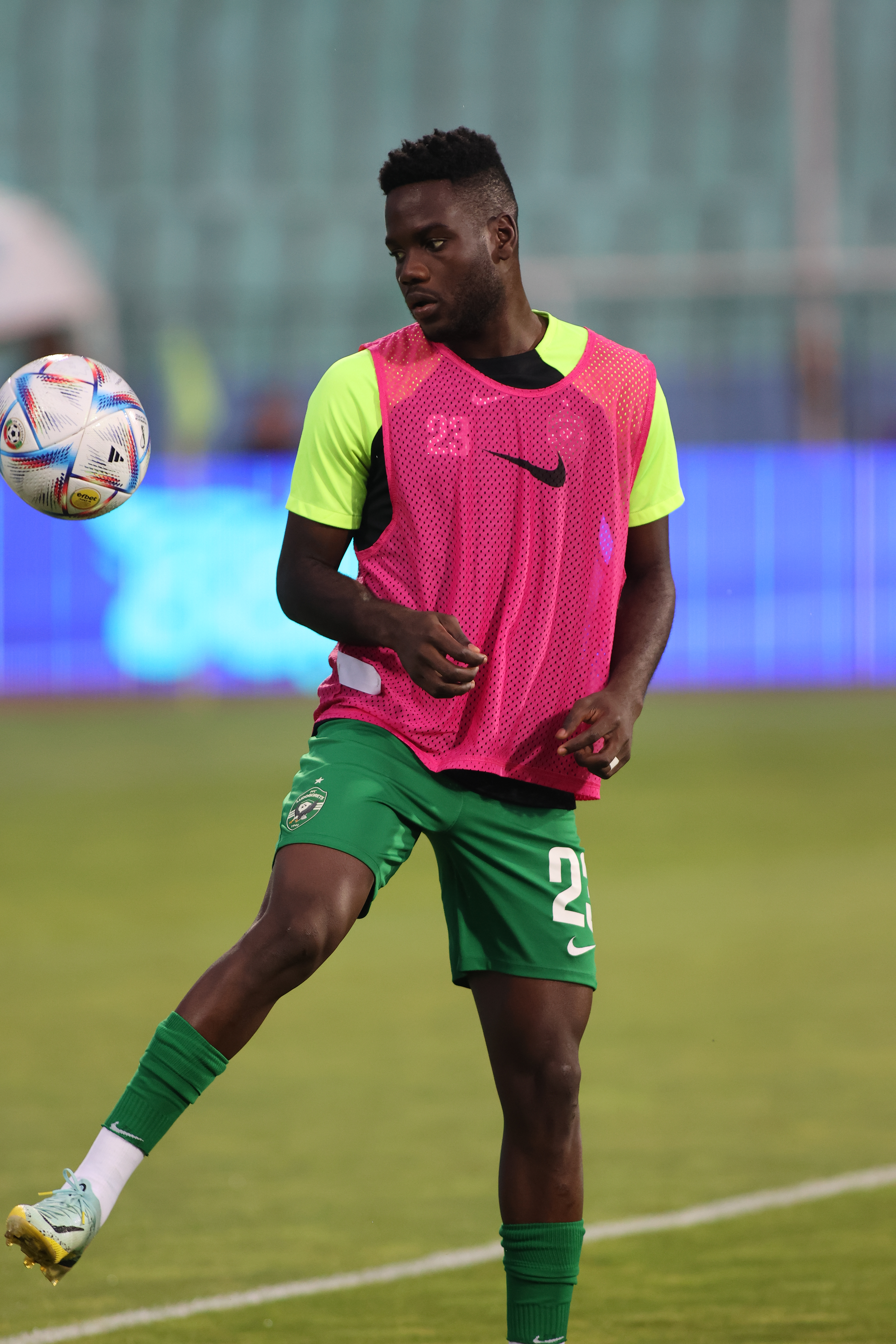
- Show with Ludogorets Razgrad

Personal information
- Full name: Manuel Luís da Silva Cafumana
- Date of birth: 6 March 1999 (age 27)
- Place of birth: Luanda, Angola
- Height: 1.80 m (5 ft 11 in)
- Position: Midfielder

Team information
- Current team: Kocaelispor

Senior career*
Years	Team	Apps	(Gls)
2017–2019	1º de Agosto	61	(2)
2019–2021	Lille	0	(0)
2019–2020	→ B-SAD (loan)	24	(0)
2020–2021	→ Boavista (loan)	31	(0)
2021–2023	Ludogorets Razgrad	48	(3)
2023–2026	Maccabi Haifa	21	(0)
2024–2025	→ FC Dallas (loan)	13	(0)
2025	→ Kocaelispor (loan)	30	(0)
2026–	Kocaelispor	30	(0)

International career^{‡}
2017	Angola U20	3	(0)
2017–	Angola	65	(2)
- * Club domestic league appearances and goals as of 10 June 2026 ‡ National team caps and goals as of 9 June 2026

Manuel Luís da Silva Cafumana (born 6 March 1999), commonly known as Show or Chow, is an Angolan professional footballer who plays as a midfielder for Turkish Süper Lig club Kocaelispor and the Angola national team.

== Career ==
=== Club ===
In August 2021, Show joined Bulgarian club Ludogorets Razgrad. In August 2023, he signed a contract with Israeli team Maccabi Haifa. On 22 July 2024, Show joined Major League Soccer side FC Dallas on loan, with Dallas holding an option to make the deal permanent.

=== International ===
On 25 June 2017, Show earned his first cap for Angola in the 1–0 away win over Mauritius in a COSAFA Cup match.

On 3 December 2025, Show was called up to the Angola squad for the 2025 Africa Cup of Nations.

== Career statistics ==
=== Club ===
As of 20 July 2023

Club	Season	League			Cup		Continental		Other		Total	
Club	Season	Division	Apps	Goals	Apps	Goals	Apps	Goals	Apps	Goals	Apps	Goals
1º de Agosto	2017	Girabola	16	0	5 (Note: Appearances in the Taça de Angola)	0	0	0	0	0	21	0
1º de Agosto	2018	Girabola	20	0	0	0	13 (Note: Appearances in the CAF Champions League)	0	0	0	33	0
1º de Agosto	2018–19	Girabola	25	2	2	0	2	0	0	0	29	2
1º de Agosto	Total		61	2	7	0	15	0	0	0	83	2
Lille	2019–20	Ligue 1	0	0	0	0	0	0	0	0	0	0
Belenenses SAD (loan)	2019–20	Primeira Liga	24	0	1 (Note: Appearances in the Taça de Portugal)	0	0	0	0	0	25	0
Boavista (loan)	2020–21	Primeira Liga	31	0	2	0	0	0	0	0	33	0
Ludogorets Razgrad	2021–22	First League	21	2	4	1	4 (Note: Appearances in UEFA Europa League)	0	–		29	3
Ludogorets Razgrad	2022–23	First League	26	1	4	1	11 (Note: Appearances in UEFA Champions League)	0	1 (Note: Appearance in Bulgarian Supercup)	0	42	2
Ludogorets Razgrad	2023–24	First League	1	0	0	0	1	0	0 (Note: Appearance in Bulgarian Supercup)	0	2	0
Ludogorets Razgrad	Total		48	3	8	2	16	0	1	0	73	5
Maccabi Haifa	2023–24	Israeli Premier League	0	0	0	0	0	0	–		0	0
Maccabi Haifa	Total		0	0	0	0	0	0	0	0	0	0
Career total			164	5	18	2	31	0	1	0	214	7

=== International ===
As of matches played 9 June 2026.

National team	Year	Apps	Goals
Angola	2017	1	0
Angola	2018	8	0
Angola	2019	7	0
Angola	2020	3	0
Angola	2021	5	1
Angola	2022	4	0
Angola	2023	7	0
Angola	2024	15	0
Angola	2025	13	1
Angola	2026	2	0
Total		65	2

=== International goals ===
Scores and results list Angola's goal tally first.

No.	Date	Venue	Opponent	Score	Result	Competition
1.	29 March 2021	Estádio 11 de Novembro, Luanda, Angola	Gabon	1–0	2–0	2021 Africa Cup of Nations qualification
2.	22 December 2025	Marrakesh Stadium, Marrakesh, Morocco	South Africa	1–1	1–2	2025 Africa Cup of Nations

== Honours ==
Ludogorets Razgrad

- First Professional Football League: 2021–22, 2022–23
- Bulgarian Supercup: 2022
- Bulgarian Cup: 2022–23

Angola

- Four Nations Tournament bronze medal: 2018

== Player name ==
Cafumana goes by the name Show. He told FIFA: "My grandfather on my father's side was also a player and operated on the wing. In the neighbourhood, his on-field exploits were often like a show, and the nickname stuck. With me being his first grandchild, he said: 'This boy has to be my namesake'. And he also gave me the nickname. That's where it came from."
