= 2023 Bulgarian Cup final =

Финал на Sesame Купа на България 2023
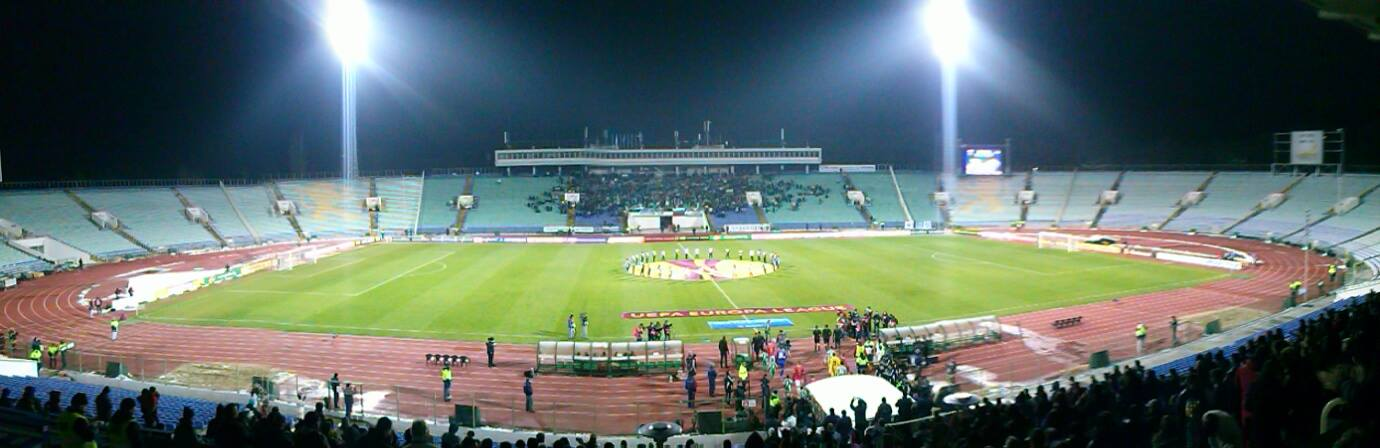
- Event: 2022–23 Bulgarian Cup
CSKA 1948	Ludogorets Razgrad
1	3
- Date: 24 May 2023
- Venue: Vasil Levski, Sofia
- Man of the Match: Kiril Despodov (Ludogorets)
- Referee: Dragomir Draganov (Varna)
- Attendance: 1,400
- Weather: Partly cloudy 22 °C (72 °F)

The 2023 Bulgarian Cup final was the final match of the 2022–23 Bulgarian Cup and the 83rd final of the Bulgarian Cup. The final took place on 24 May 2023 at the Vasil Levski National Stadium in Sofia. On 16 May the date and venue has been confirmed.

The clubs contesting the final were CSKA 1948 and Ludogorets Razgrad. For CSKA 1948, this was the very first final in their club history since their foundation in 2016, whereas for Ludogorets, it was the first since 2017 and 4th overall. This was also the first meeting between both clubs on the stage of the Bulgarian Cup.

Ludogorets won the final 3–1 for their third cup title and first since 2014. As they were already assured of a participation in the UEFA Europa Conference League via their league performance, their berth for the second qualifying round of 2023–24 UEFA Europa Conference League was passed to the third-placed team in the 2022–23 First League. In contrast with the previous final, this match had one of the lowest attendance records in the history of the competition.

== Route to the final ==
CSKA 1948			Round	Ludogorets Razgrad
Opponent	Result	Legs		Opponent	Result	Legs
Sevlievo	4–0	away	Round of 32	Rozova Dolina	2–0	away
Beroe	2–0	away	Round of 16	Levski Sofia	2–1	home
Arda	1–0 (a.e.t.)	away	Quarter-finals	Spartak Varna	2–1	home
Lokomotiv Sofia	5–4 (agg.)	3–2 away; 2–2 (a.e.t.) home	Semi-finals	Cherno More	3–3 (agg.) (4–1 p)	2–1 away; 1–2 (a.e.t.) home

== Match ==
=== Details ===
24 May 2023
19:00 UTC+3

CSKA 1948	1–3	Ludogorets Razgrad
Chochev 59'	Report	Caio Vidal 8', 43'; Tissera 81'

Vasil Levski National Stadium, Sofia
Attendance: 1,400
Referee: Dragomir Draganov (Varna)

CSKA 1948	Ludogorets

GK	29	(Bulgaria) Daniel Naumov (c)
RB	22	(Bulgaria) Reyan Daskalov		(substituted off) 45'
CB	87	(Bulgaria) Simeon Petrov
CB	14	(Brazil) Héliton Santos
LB	18	(Brazil) Sidcley
DM	28	(Bulgaria) Emil Tsenov		(substituted off) 45'
RM	10	(Bulgaria) Georgi Rusev
CM	39	(Tajikistan) Parvizdzhon Umarbayev		(substituted off) 82'
CM	18	(Bulgaria) Ivaylo Chochev
LM	99	(Bulgaria) Radoslav Kirilov		(substituted off) 56'
CF	9	(Bulgaria) Aleksandar Kolev
Substitutes:
GK	33	(Ukraine) Hennadiy Hanyev
DF	4	(Bulgaria) Angel Lyaskov
DF	19	(Cape Verde) Steve Furtado	(substituted on) 45'
DF	24	(Bulgaria) Lazar Marin
MF	6	(Ghana) Carlos Ohene
MF	7	(Bulgaria) Mario Topuzov	(substituted on) 45'
MF	58	(Brazil) Octávio
FW	8	(Brazil) Pedrinho	(substituted on) 56'
FW	55	(Bulgaria) Svetoslav Dikov	(substituted on) 82'
Manager:
(Bulgaria) Todor Yanchev

GK	12	(Croatia) Simon Sluga	(yellow card) 90+7'
RB	16	(Norway) Aslak Fonn Witry		(substituted off) 55'
CB	32	(Ukraine) Ihor Plastun
CB	24	(Benin) Olivier Verdon
LB	37	(Ghana) Bernard Tekpetey
DM	23	(Angola) Show
DM	30	(Brazil) Pedro Naressi	(yellow card) 32'	(substituted off) 61'
RM	11	(Bulgaria) Kiril Despodov (c)		(substituted off) 71'
AM	90	(Bulgaria) Spas Delev		(substituted off) 61'
LM	77	(Brazil) Caio Vidal		(substituted off) 55'
CF	9	(Brazil) Igor Thiago	(yellow card) 62'
Substitutes:
GK	1	(Netherlands) Sergio Padt
DF	2	(Spain) Pipa	(substituted on) 55'
DF	22	(Argentina) Franco Russo
MF	6	(Poland) Jakub Piotrowski	(substituted on) 55'
MF	8	(Portugal) Claude Gonçalves
MF	20	(Brazil) Nonato	(substituted on) 61'	(yellow card) 80'
MF	88	(Bulgaria) Todor Nedelev
FW	7	(Brazil) Raí	(substituted on) 61'
FW	10	(Argentina) Matías Tissera	(substituted on) 71'
Manager:
(Bulgaria) Ivaylo Petev

Man of the Match:
Kiril Despodov (Ludogorets Razgrad)
Assistant referees:
Ivo Kolev (Sofia)
Hristo Hadzhiyski (Varna)
Fourth official:
Valentin Zhelezov (Burgas)
Video assistant referee:
Krasen Georgiev (Varna)
Assistant video assistant referee:
Miroslav Maksimov (Sandanski)

Match rules

- 90 minutes.
- 30 minutes of extra time if necessary.
- Penalty shoot-out if scores still level.
- Seven named substitutes.
- Maximum of five substitutions, with a sixth allowed in extra time. (Note: Each team will be given only three opportunities to make substitutions, with a fourth opportunity in extra time, excluding substitutions made at half-time, before the start of extra time and at half-time in extra time.)
