= Matías Tissera =

Argentine footballer

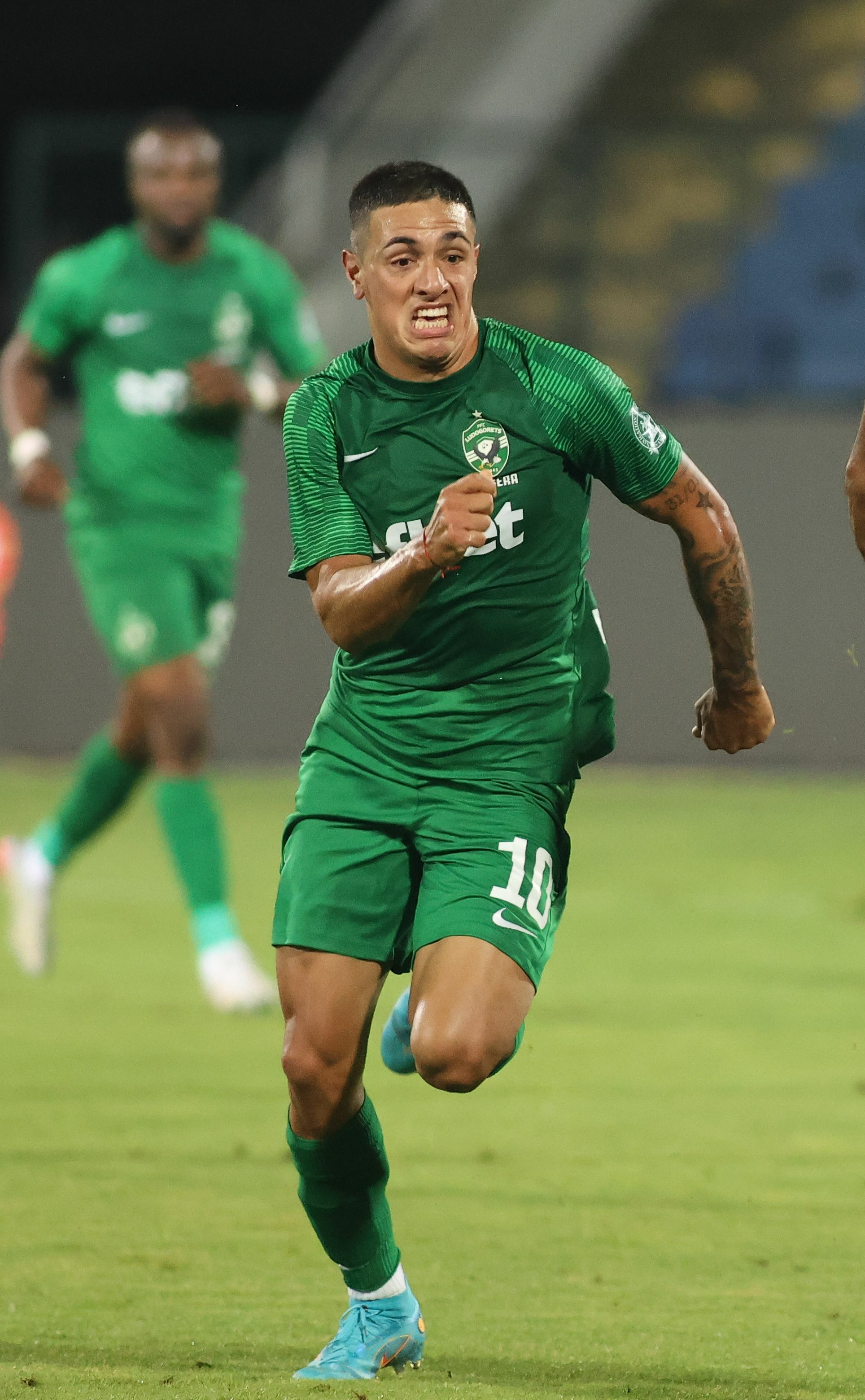
- Tissera with Ludogorets Razgrad

Personal information
- Date of birth: 6 September 1996 (age 30)
- Place of birth: Rojas, Argentina
- Height: 1.73 m (5 ft 8 in)
- Position: Forward

Team information
- Current team: Instituto
- Number: 27

Youth career
- Argentino de Rojas
- Sarmiento de Rosario
- 2012–2017: Newell's Old Boys

Senior career*
| Years | Team | Apps | (Gls) |
| 2017–2021 | Newell's Old Boys | 5 | (0) |
| 2017–2018 | → Quilmes (loan) | 12 | (0) |
| 2018–2019 | → Independiente Rivadavia (loan) | 18 | (3) |
| 2019–2021 | → Platense (loan) | 20 | (5) |
| 2021–2022 | Platense | 32 | (14) |
| 2022–2026 | Ludogorets Razgrad | 54 | (16) |
| 2022–2024 | Ludogorets Razgrad II | 4 | (3) |
| 2025 | → Huracán (loan) | 20 | (2) |
| 2026– | Instituto | 6 | (1) |
- * Club domestic league appearances and goals as of 18:12, 10 May 2026 (UTC)

Matías Tissera (born 6 September 1996) is an Argentine professional footballer who plays as a forward for Argentine Primera División club Instituto.

== Career ==
Tissera spent his youth career with Argentino de Rojas, Sarmiento de Rosario and Newell's Old Boys. He entered the first-team of Newell's Old Boys in March 2017, making his debut on 18 March in a 3–0 victory over Vélez Sarsfield. Four further appearances followed during 2016–17. On 14 August 2017, Tissera was loaned to Primera B Nacional's Quilmes until June 2018. He featured in twelve matches for Quilmes as they finished 12th. Upon returning to his parent club, Tissera was loaned out again to Independiente Rivadavia of Primera B Nacional. In February 2022, Tissera joined Bulgarian champions Ludogorets Razgrad. During his time with the club, he has mostly seen action as a substitute. On 7 June 2023, on the last matchday of the season Tissera scored the only goal in a 1–0 win over Cherno More, which secured the title for Ludogorets.

In January 2025, Tissera joined Huracán on loan until December 2025 for a loan fee of €200,000 with the option to buy for €1.75m.

== Personal life ==
On 16 March 2022, Tissera's girlfriend, Sofia Arozamena, gave birth to their first child, Felipe, in Varna, Bulgaria.

== Career statistics ==
As of match played 20 December 2024

Appearances and goals by club, season and competition
| Club | Season | League | | | National cup (Note: Copa Argentina, Bulgarian Cup) | | Continental | | Other | | Total | |
| Club | Season | Division | Apps | Goals | Apps | Goals | Apps | Goals | Apps | Goals | Apps | Goals |
|---|---|---|---|---|---|---|---|---|---|---|---|---|
| Newell's Old Boys | 2016–17 | Argentine Primera División | 5 | 0 | 0 | 0 | — | | — | | 5 | 0 |
| Newell's Old Boys | 2017–18 | Argentine Primera División | 0 | 0 | 0 | 0 | 0 | 0 | — | | 0 | 0 |
| Newell's Old Boys | 2018–19 | Argentine Primera División | 0 | 0 | 0 | 0 | — | | — | | 0 | 0 |
| Newell's Old Boys | Total | | 5 | 0 | 0 | 0 | 0 | 0 | — | | 5 | 0 |
| Quilmes (loan) | 2017–18 | Primera B Nacional | 12 | 0 | 0 | 0 | — | | — | | 12 | 0 |
| Independiente Rivadavia (loan) | 2018–19 | Primera B Nacional | 18 | 3 | 0 | 0 | — | | — | | 0 | 0 |
| Platense (loan) | 2019–20 | Primera B Nacional | 11 | 1 | 0 | 0 | — | | — | | 11 | 1 |
| Platense (loan) | 2020–21 | Primera B Nacional | 9 | 4 | 0 | 0 | — | | — | | 9 | 4 |
| Platense (loan) | Total | | 20 | 5 | 0 | 0 | — | | — | | 20 | 15 |
| Platense | 2021 | Argentine Primera División | 32 | 14 | 0 | 0 | — | | — | | 32 | 14 |
| Ludogorets Razgrad | 2021–22 | Bulgarian First League | 9 | 2 | 3 | 2 | 0 | 0 | 0 | 0 | 12 | 4 |
| Ludogorets Razgrad | 2022–23 | Bulgarian First League | 27 | 12 | 6 | 1 | 12 | 3 | 1 (Note: Appearance in Bulgarian Supercup) | 0 | 46 | 16 |
| Ludogorets Razgrad | 2023–24 | Bulgarian First League | 13 | 2 | 5 | 2 | 10 | 3 | 0 (Note: Appearance in Bulgarian Supercup) | 0 | 28 | 7 |
| Ludogorets Razgrad | 2024–25 | Bulgarian First League | 5 | 0 | 1 | 1 | 3 | 0 | 0 | 0 | 9 | 1 |
| Ludogorets Razgrad | Total | | 54 | 16 | 15 | 6 | 25 | 6 | 1 | 0 | 95 | 28 |
| Career total | | | 141 | 38 | 15 | 6 | 25 | 6 | 1 | 0 | 182 | 50 |

== Honours ==
Ludogorets Razgrad

- Bulgarian First League (3): 2021–22, 2022–23, 2023–24
- Bulgarian Supercup: 2022
- Bulgarian Cup: 2022–23
