= Rick (footballer, born 1999) =

Brazilian footballer

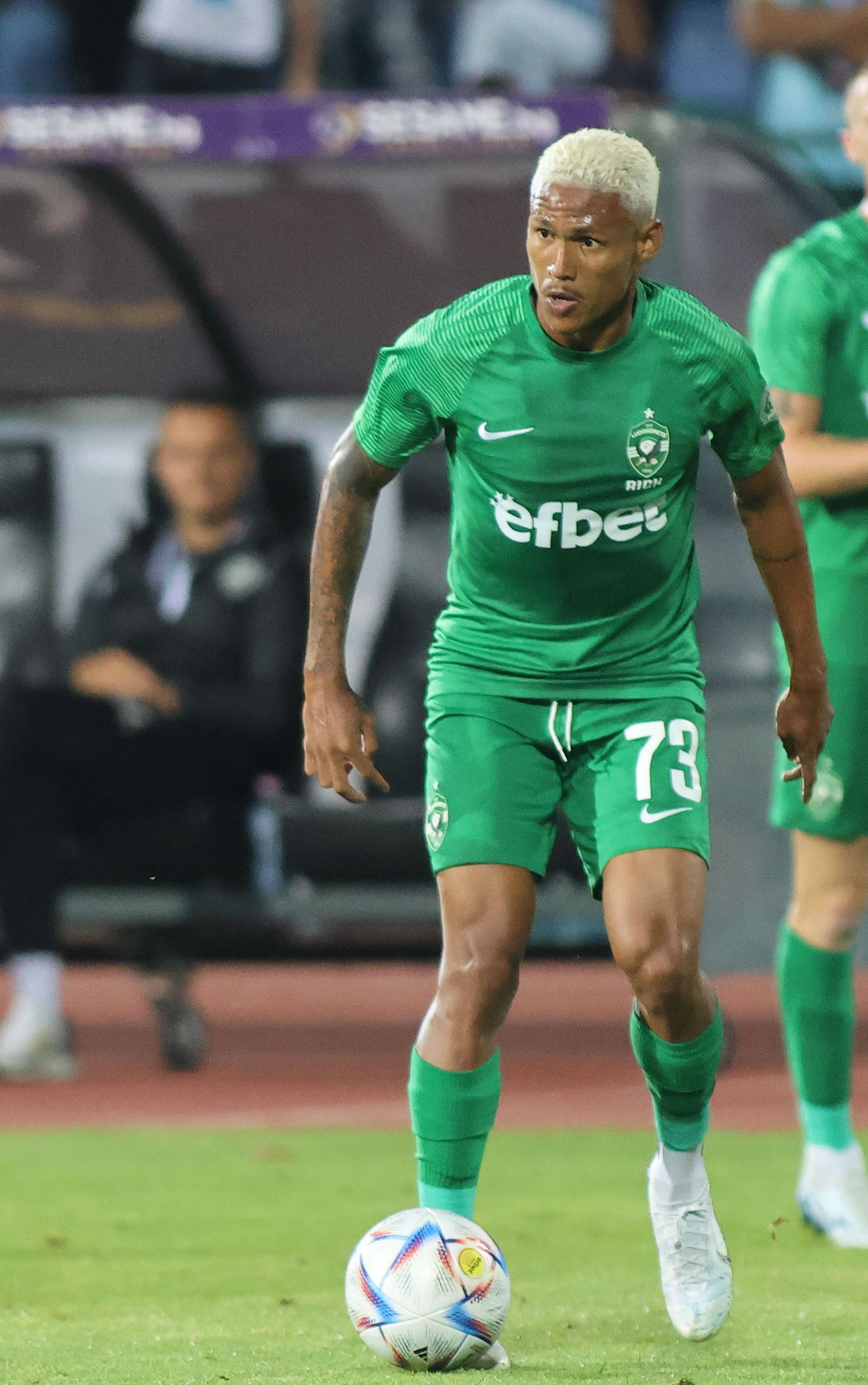
- Rick with Ludogorets Razgrad in 2022

Personal information
- Full name: Rick Jhonatan Lima Morais
- Date of birth: 2 September 1999 (age 27)
- Place of birth: São Luís, Brazil
- Height: 1.70 m (5 ft 7 in)
- Position: Forward

Team information
- Current team: Talleres
- Number: 37

Youth career
- Moto Club (futsal)
- 2015–2016: Boca Júnior
- 2016: Grêmio
- 2017: Ivoti
- 2018–2019: Ceará

Senior career*
Years	Team	Apps	(Gls)
2018–2021	Ceará	50	(7)
2022–2025	Ludogorets Razgrad	79	(9)
2025–	Talleres	57	(5)
- * Club domestic league appearances and goals as of 17:46, 15 November 2026 (UTC)

Rick Jhonatan Lima Morais (born 2 September 1999), simply known as Rick, is a Brazilian professional footballer who plays as a forward for Argentine Primera División club Talleres.

== Career ==
=== Ceará ===
Born in São Luís, Maranhão, Rick joined Ceará's youth setup in 2018, after starting it out at Moto Club's futsal team and subsequently representing Boca Júnior and Grêmio. He made his first team debut on 25 August of that year, coming on as a second-half substitute in a 0–1 home loss against Ferroviário, for the season's Copa Fares Lopes.

Rick made his professional debut on 18 January 2019, replacing Felipe Silva in a 5–0 Copa do Nordeste home routing of Sampaio Corrêa. His Série A debut occurred on 20 May, in a 2–1 home win against his former side Grêmio.

=== Ludogorets Razgrad ===
On 19 December 2021, Ceará announced Rick's transfer to Bulgarian side Ludogorets Razgrad. During the winter training camp in January 2023, Rick received a serious injury, sending him out from play for at least 6 months. By August 2023, he had made a recovery and returned to first team action.

== Career statistics ==
As of 20 December 2024

Appearances and goals by club, season and competition
Club	Season	League			State League		Cup		Continental		Other		Total	
Club	Season	Division	Apps	Goals	Apps	Goals	Apps	Goals	Apps	Goals	Apps	Goals	Apps	Goals
Ceará	2018	Série A	0	0	0	0	0	0	—		6 (Note: Appearance(s) in Copa Fares Lopes)	0	6	0
Ceará	2019	Série A	4	0	0	0	0	0	—		1 (Note: Appearance(s) in Copa do Nordeste)	0	5	0
Ceará	2020	Série A	8	0	4	0	1	0	—		6	0	19	0
Ceará	2021	Série A	28	6	6	1	2	0	1 (Note: Appearance(s) in Copa Sudamericana)	0	4	0	41	7
Ceará	Total		40	6	10	1	3	0	1	0	17	0	71	7
Ludogorets Razgrad	2021–22	Bulgarian First League	12	0	–		3	0	0	0	0	0	15	0
Ludogorets Razgrad	2022–23	Bulgarian First League	17	2	–		2	1	13	3	1	0	33	6
Ludogorets Razgrad	2023–24	Bulgarian First League	32	3	–		5	5	5	0	1	0	43	8
Ludogorets Razgrad	2024–25	Bulgarian First League	18	4	–		0	0	13	2	0	0	31	6
Ludogorets Razgrad	Total		79	9	0	0	10	6	31	5	2	0	122	20
Career total			119	15	10	1	13	6	32	5	19	0	193	27

== Honours ==
Ceará

- Copa do Nordeste: 2020

Ludogorets Razgrad

- Bulgarian First League: 2021–22, 2022–23, 2023–24
- Bulgarian Supercup: 2022, 2023

Club Atlético Talleres

- Supercopa Internacional: 2023
