= Dimitar Iliev (footballer, born 1999) =

Bulgarian footballer

Personal information
- Full name: Dimitar Emilov Iliev
- Date of birth: 22 June 1999 (age 27)
- Place of birth: Gorna Oryahovitsa, Bulgaria
- Height: 1.78 m (5 ft 10 in)
- Position: Left-back

Team information
- Current team: Belasitsa Petrich
- Number: 11

Youth career
- 2008–2012: Lokomotiv GO
- 2012–2016: Litex Lovech
- 2016–2018: Ludogorets Razgrad

Senior career*
Years	Team	Apps	(Gls)
2017–2021	Ludogorets Razgrad II	73	(0)
2018–2021	Ludogorets Razgrad	1	(0)
2021	CSKA 1948 II	10	(1)
2021–2022	CSKA 1948	4	(0)
2022	Botev Vratsa	1	(0)
2022–2024	Ludogorets Razgrad II	68	(0)
2022–2024	Ludogorets Razgrad	1	(0)
2025	Etar	30	(3)
2025–	Belasitsa Petrich	5	(0)

International career^{‡}
2014–2016	Bulgaria U17	3	(0)
2017–2018	Bulgaria U18	5	(0)
- * Club domestic league appearances and goals as of 24 May 2026 ‡ National team caps and goals as of 17 March 2018

Dimitar Iliev (Bulgarian: Димитър Илиев; born 22 July 1999) is a Bulgarian footballer who plays as a defender for Belasitsa Petrich.

== Youth career ==
Dimitar Iliev began playing football in the local team of Lokomotiv (GO). Later Iliev joined the youth academy of Litex (Lovech). He won the BFU cup two times. In 2016 Iliev joined the youth team of Ludogorets (Razgrad). He won the Bulgarian championship twice and he has got one BFU cup. Iliev has made many appearances for Ludogorets in the UEFA Youth League’s group stage.

== Career ==
=== Ludogorets Razgrad ===
Iliev made his professional debut for the first team on 20 May 2018 in a league match against Botev Plovdiv, coming as a substitute of Lachezar Kovachev after he got injured in the 64th minute. Iliev played mainly for the second team of Ludogorets and he made 6 assistances before he left the club.

=== CSKA 1948 ===
In 2021 Iliev joined CSKA 1948. He made his debut for the team against CSKA Sofia. Iliev played also for the second team and scored a goal against Neftochimic.

=== Botev Vratsa ===
At the end of 2021 Iliev signed with Botev Vratsa. After finding it difficult to establish himself as part of the first team, on 1 May 2022, it was confirmed that he had left by mutual consent.

=== Return to Ludogorets ===
In 2022 Iliev returned to Ludogorets. He is mainly playing for the second team. In the second round of the Bulgarian Cup, Iliev scored his debut goal for the first team on 18 November 2022 against Rozova Dolina Kazanlak.

== Career statistics ==
=== Club ===
As of 26 May 2024

Appearances and goals by club, season and competition
Club	Season	League			Cup		Europe		Other		Total	
Club	Season	Division	Apps	Goals	Apps	Goals	Apps	Goals	Apps	Goals	Apps	Goals
Ludogorets Razgrad II	2016–17	Second League	1	0	–		–		–		1	0
Ludogorets Razgrad II	2017–18	Second League	2	0	–		–		–		2	0
Ludogorets Razgrad II	2018–19	Second League	23	0	–		–		–		23	0
Ludogorets Razgrad II	2019–20	Second League	21	0	–		–		–		21	0
Ludogorets Razgrad II	2020–21	Second League	26	0	–		–		–		26	0
Ludogorets Razgrad II	Total		73	0	0	0	0	0	0	0	73	0
Ludogorets Razgrad	2017–18	First League	1	0	0	0	0	0	0	0	1	0
CSKA 1948 II	2021–22	Second League	10	1	–		–		–		10	1
CSKA 1948	2021–22	First League	4	0	0	0	–		–		4	0
Botev Vratsa	2021–22	First League	1	0	0	0	–		–		1	0
Ludogorets Razgrad II	2022–23	Second League	33	0	–		–		–		33	0
Ludogorets Razgrad II	2023–24	Second League	30	0	–		–		–		30	0
Ludogorets Razgrad II	Total		63	0	0	0	0	0	0	0	63	0
Ludogorets Razgrad	2022–23	First League	0	0	1	1	0	0	0	0	1	1
Ludogorets Razgrad	2023–24	First League	1	0	0	0	0	0	0	0	1	0
Ludogorets Razgrad	Total		1	0	1	1	0	0	0	0	2	1
Career total			153	1	1	1	0	0	0	0	154	2
