= Emil Tsenov =

Bulgarian footballer

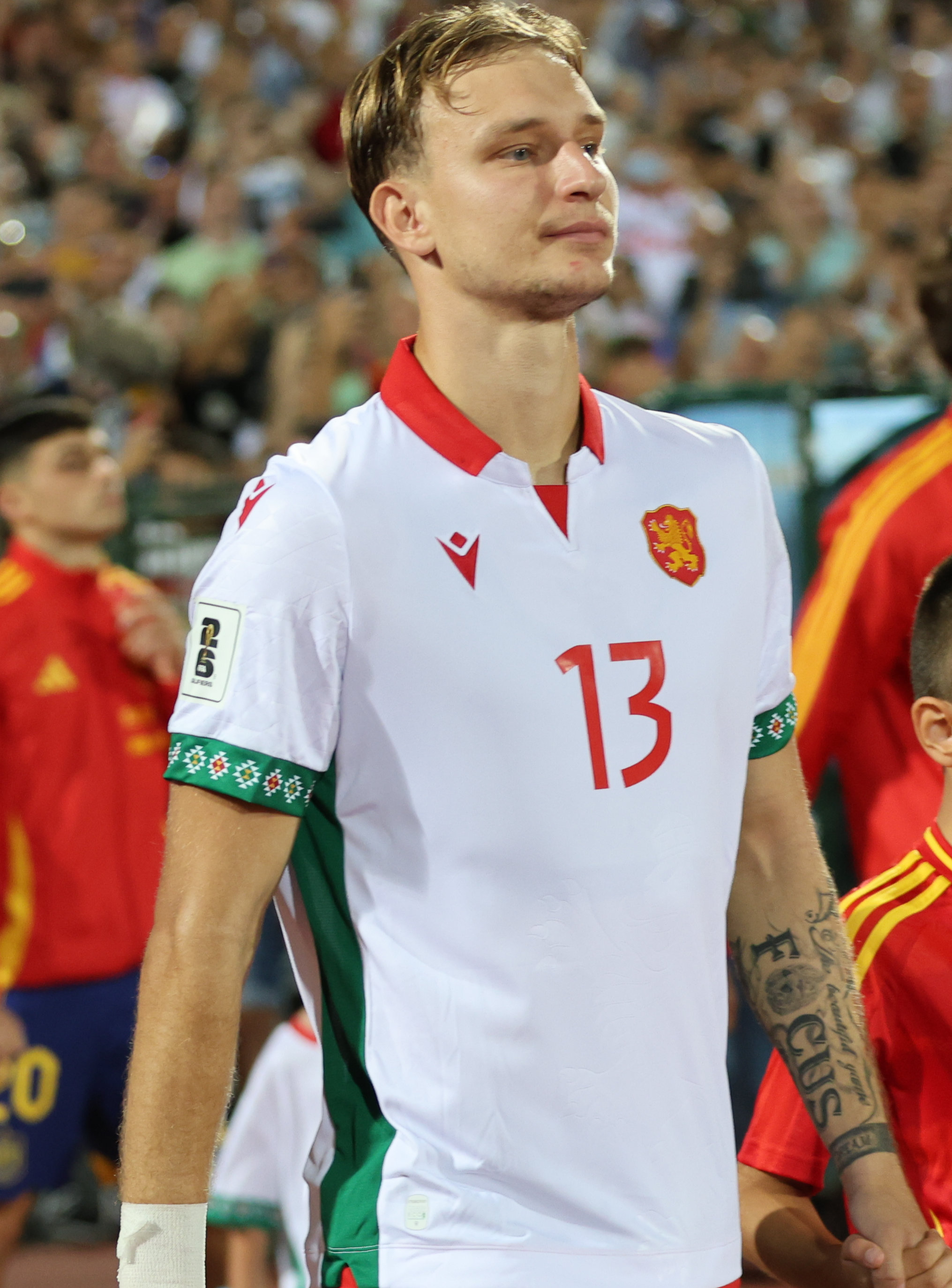

Personal information
- Full name: Emil Ivanov Tsenov
- Date of birth: 26 April 2002 (age 24)
- Place of birth: Sofia, Bulgaria
- Height: 1.88 m (6 ft 2 in)
- Position: Centre-back

Team information
- Current team: Orenburg
- Number: 26

Youth career
- –2020: CSKA Sofia

Senior career*
Years	Team	Apps	(Gls)
2020–2021	Litex Lovech	5	(0)
2021–2023	Minyor Pernik	51	(5)
2023	CSKA 1948 III	3	(3)
2023	CSKA 1948 II	17	(0)
2023–2025	CSKA 1948	77	(2)
2025–	Orenburg	21	(3)

International career^{‡}
2018	Bulgaria U16	1	(0)
2018–2019	Bulgaria U17	3	(0)
2021–2022	Bulgaria U19	2	(0)
2022–2024	Bulgaria U21	18	(1)
2025–	Bulgaria	10	(0)
- * Club domestic league appearances and goals as of 21 November 2026 ‡ National team caps and goals as of 23:09, 13 November 2026

Emil Ivanov Tsenov (Bulgarian: Емил Иванов Ценов; born 26 April 2002) is a Bulgarian professional footballer who plays as a centre-back for Russian Premier League club Orenburg and the Bulgaria national team.

== Club career ==
Tsenov started his career in CSKA Sofia academy and in 2020 moved to Litex Lovech. He joined Minyor Pernik in 2021 and after 2 years he joined CSKA 1948. On 7 March 2023 he completed his professional debut for CSKA 1948. He started playing in third and second team at first and marked his season playing in all top 3 leagues in Bulgarian football.

On 9 September 2025, Tsenov signed with Russian Premier League club Orenburg.

== International career ==
In August 2025, Tsenov received his first call-up to the national team for the 2026 World Cup qualifiers against Spain and Georgia. On 4 September 2025, he made his debut, playing the full 90 minutes in the 0:3 loss against the reigning European champions.

== Career statistics ==
=== Club ===
As of 21 November 2026

Club performance			League		Cup		Continental		Other		Total	
Club	League	Season	Apps	Goals	Apps	Goals	Apps	Goals	Apps	Goals	Apps	Goals
Litex Lovech	Second League	2020–21	5	0	0	0	–		–		5	0
Minyor Pernik	Second League	2021–22	35	4	1	0	–		–		36	4
Minyor Pernik	Second League	2022–23	16	1	1	0	–		–		17	1
Minyor Pernik	Total		51	5	2	0	0	0	0	0	53	5
CSKA 1948 III	Third League	2022–23	3	3	–		–		–		3	3
CSKA 1948 II	Second League	2022–23	5	0	–		–		–		5	0
CSKA 1948 II	Second League	2023–24	7	0	–		–		–		7	0
CSKA 1948 II	Second League	2024–25	5	0	–		–		–		5	0
CSKA 1948 II	Total		17	0	0	0	0	0	0	0	17	0
CSKA 1948	First League	2022–23	7	0	4	0	–		–		11	0
CSKA 1948	First League	2023–24	29	0	3	0	1	0	2	0	35	0
CSKA 1948	First League	2024–25	32	1	1	0	4	0	–		37	1
CSKA 1948	First League	2025–26	7	1	0	0	–		–		7	1
CSKA 1948	Total		75	2	8	0	5	0	2	0	90	2
Orenburg	Russian Premier League	2025–26	7	2	2	0	–		–		9	2
Orenburg	Russian Premier League	2026–27	14	1	1	0	–		–		15	1
Orenburg	Total		21	3	3	0	0	0	0	0	24	3
Career statistics			172	13	13	0	5	0	2	0	192	13

=== International ===
As of match played 13 November 2026

Appearances and goals by national team and year
National team	Year	Apps	Goals
Bulgaria	2025	2	0
Bulgaria	2026	8	0
Total		10	0
