= Franco Russo =

Argentine footballer

Personal information
- Full name: Franco Matías Russo
- Date of birth: 25 October 1994 (age 32)
- Place of birth: Buenos Aires, Argentina
- Height: 1.85 m (6 ft 1 in)
- Position: Centre back

Team information
- Current team: Qatar
- Number: 22

Youth career
- All Boys

Senior career*
Years	Team	Apps	(Gls)
2014–2015	Tamarite	32	(3)
2015–2017	Espanyol B	12	(0)
2017	→ Vilafranca (loan)	13	(0)
2017–2018	Ontinyent	33	(1)
2018–2023	Mallorca	35	(1)
2019–2020	→ Ponferradina (loan)	36	(1)
2023–2025	Ludogorets Razgrad	25	(3)
2024	→ OH Leuven (loan)	12	(1)
2024–2025	→ Querétaro (loan)	27	(2)
2025–	Qatar	0	(0)
- * Club domestic league appearances and goals as of 27 May 2025

Franco Matías Russo (born 25 October 1994) is an Argentine professional footballer who plays as a central defender for Qatar Stars League club Qatar.

== Club career ==
Born in Buenos Aires, Russo finished his formation with All Boys before moving to Spain for a trial with Rayo Vallecano. Despite being told he would earn a contract with the club, he was released after suffering a quadriceps injury.

After living in a room in Madrid and a failed trial at Lleida Esportiu, Russo signed for Tercera División side CDJ Tamarite, and made his senior debut with the club during the 2014–15 campaign. On 25 June 2015, he agreed to a two-year contract with RCD Espanyol, being initially assigned to reserves in Segunda División B.

On 28 January 2017, after featuring rarely, Russo was loaned to FC Vilafranca in the fourth division, until June. He left his parent club as his contract expired on 30 June, and signed for Ontinyent CF in Segunda División B on 5 August.

On 9 July 2018, Russo signed a two-year contract with Segunda División side RCD Mallorca. He made his professional debut on 11 September, starting in a 1–0 home win against Real Oviedo for the season's Copa del Rey.

Russo made his debut in the second division on 29 September 2018, starting in a 1–1 away draw against CD Lugo. He contributed with only four league appearances during the campaign, as his side achieved promotion to La Liga, and was loaned to second division side SD Ponferradina on 12 July 2019.

Upon returning, Russo was again a backup option as Mallorca returned to the top tier. He made his debut in the category on 21 August 2021, starting in a 1–0 away win over Deportivo Alavés.

Russo became a regular starter during the 2021–22 season under manager Luis García, and scored his first goal in the top tier on 4 December 2021, in a 2–1 win at Atlético Madrid.

On 16 January 2023, Russo signed a contract with Bulgarian First League club Ludogorets Razgrad.
