= Emil Viyachki =

Bulgarian footballer

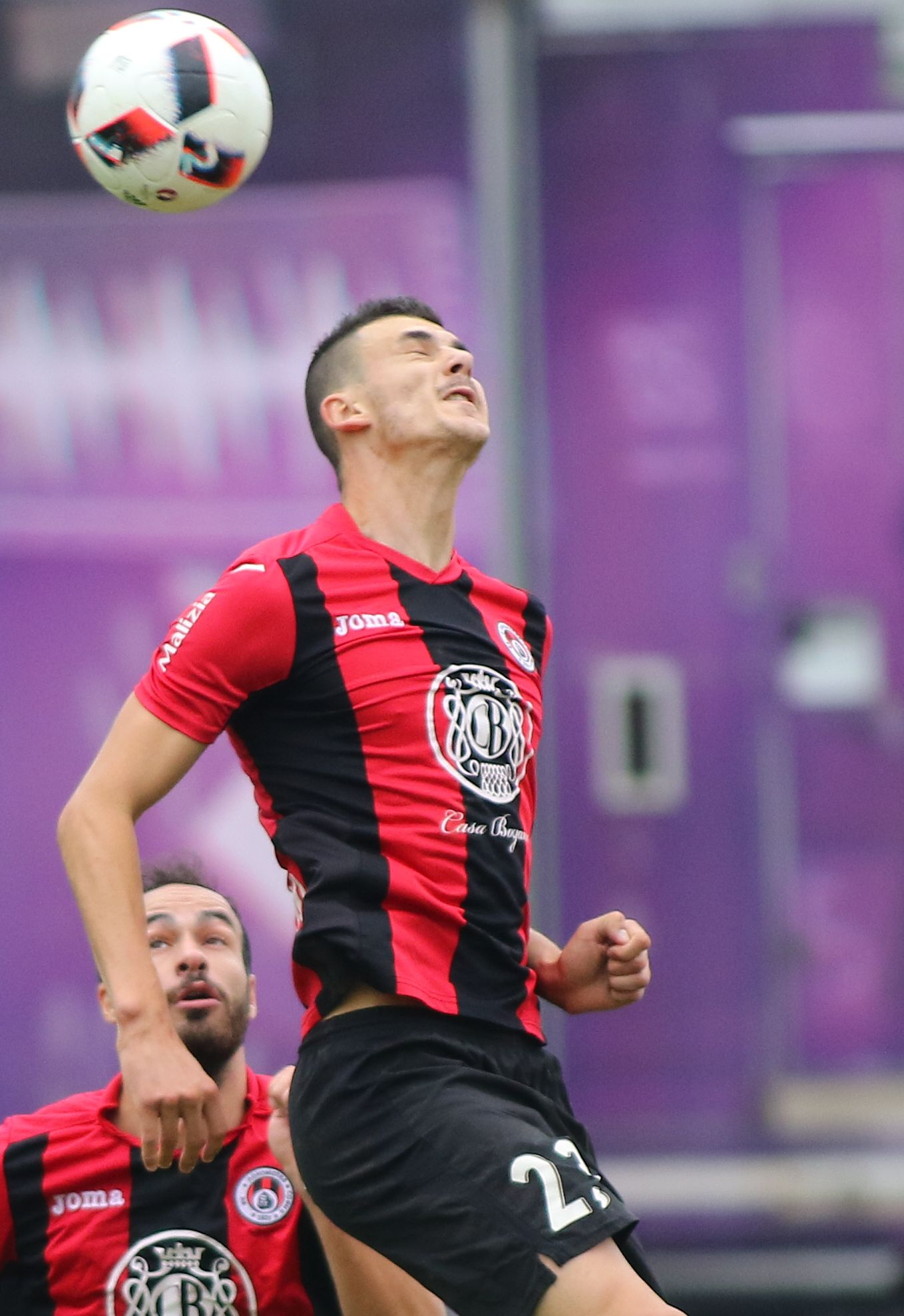

Personal information
- Full name: Emil Rumenov Viyachki
- Date of birth: 18 May 1990 (age 36)
- Place of birth: Dupnitsa, Bulgaria
- Height: 1.90 m (6 ft 3 in)
- Position: Centre back

Team information
- Current team: Marek
- Number: 23

Youth career
- –2009: Marek

Senior career*
Years	Team	Apps	(Gls)
2010–2015	Marek	109	(3)
2015–2016	Pirin Blagoevgrad	8	(0)
2016–2018	Lokomotiv Sofia	72	(7)
2019	Rabotnički	17	(2)
2019–2023	Slavia Sofia	107	(6)
2023–2024	CSKA 1948	15	(0)
2023–2024	CSKA 1948 II	6	(2)
2024–2026	Arda	54	(0)
2026–	Marek	11	(0)
- * Club domestic league appearances and goals as of 6 October 2026

Emil Viyachki (Bulgarian: Емил Виячки; born 18 May 1990) is a Bulgarian professional footballer who plays as a defender for Marek Dupnitsa.

== Career ==
Viyachki made his professional debut for Marek Dupnitsa in a match against Botev Vratsa in the B Group. Before that he played in amateur divisions with the club.

After the club was promoted to the A Group, Viyachki played in the first match for the team in the 1st league. In May 2020, Viyachki tested positive for COVID-19. In June 2024, he joined Arda Kardzhali.

== International career ==
Viyachki played for Bulgarian amateurs national team for the European Cup.

== Career statistics ==
=== Club ===
As of 29 May 2016

Club performance			League		Cup		Continental		Other		Total	
Club	League	Season	Apps	Goals	Apps	Goals	Apps	Goals	Apps	Goals	Apps	Goals
Bulgaria			League		CCB Cup		Europe		Other (Note: Includes Bulgarian Supercup matches.)		Total	
Marek Dupnitsa	B Group	2013–14	24	0	2	0	–		–		26	0
Marek Dupnitsa	A Group	2014–15	26	0	1	0	–		–		27	0
Marek Dupnitsa	Total		50	0	3	0	0	0	0	0	53	0
Pirin Blagoevgrad	A Group	2015–16	8	0	1	0	–		–		9	0
Pirin Blagoevgrad	Total		8	0	1	0	0	0	0	0	9	0
Career statistics			58	0	4	0	0	0	0	0	62	0
