= 2024–25 PFC Ludogorets Razgrad season =

Ludogorets Razgrad
2024–25 season
- Chairman: Temenuga Gazdova
- Manager: Georgi Dermendzhiev (until 15 August 2024); Zahari Sirakov (interim) (15 August–26 September 2024); Igor Jovićević (26 September 2024–9 June 2025); Rui Mota (since 13 June 2025)
- First League: 1st
- Bulgarian Cup: Winners
- Bulgarian Supercup: Winners
- Champions League: Third qualifying round
- Europa League: League phase
- Top goalscorer: League: Rwan Cruz (10); All: Rwan Cruz; Kwadwo Duah (11)
- Highest home attendance: 9,725 v. Athletic Bilbao (7 November 2024)
- Lowest home attendance: 229 v. CSKA 1948 (28 October 2024)
- Average home league attendance: 1,832
- Biggest win: 6–0 v. Chernolomets Popovo (A)
- Biggest defeat: 2–7 v. Qarabağ (H)
Home colours	Away colours	Third colours

The 2024–25 season was Ludogorets Razgrad's fourteenth consecutive season in the First League, of which they are defending champions. This article shows player statistics and all matches (official and friendly) that the club has played during the season.

In addition to successfully defending the league title for a record time, Ludogorets won the Bulgarian Cup and the Bulgarian Supercup, achieving the domestic treble for the third time in the club's history.

== Players ==
=== First-team squad ===
As of 1 June 2025

Note: Flags indicate national team as defined under FIFA eligibility rules; some limited exceptions apply. Players may hold more than one non-FIFA nationality.

No.	Pos.	Nation	Player
1	GK	NED	Sergio Padt
3	DF	BUL	Anton Nedyalkov (captain)
4	DF	POR	Dinis Almeida
5	DF	BUL	Georgi Terziev
6	MF	POL	Jakub Piotrowski
8	MF	BUL	Todor Nedelev
9	FW	SUI	Kwadwo Duah
10	FW	FRA	Antoine Baroan (on loan from Winterthur)
11	FW	BRA	Caio Vidal
14	DF	ISR	Denny Gropper
15	DF	SWE	Edvin Kurtulus
16	DF	NOR	Aslak Fonn Witry
17	DF	ESP	Son

No.	Pos.	Nation	Player
18	MF	BUL	Ivaylo Chochev
19	FW	BUL	Georgi Rusev (on loan from Sion)
20	MF	GUI	Aguibou Camara
23	MF	CPV	Deroy Duarte
24	DF	BEN	Olivier Verdon
25	FW	COL	Emerson Rodríguez
29	FW	CIV	Eric Bile
30	MF	BRA	Pedro Naressi
37	FW	GHA	Bernard Tekpetey
39	GK	GER	Hendrik Bonmann
55	DF	BRA	Pedro Henrique
77	FW	BRA	Erick Marcus (on loan from Vasco da Gama)
82	MF	BUL	Ivan Yordanov

For recent transfers, see Transfers summer 2024 and Transfers winter 2024–25.

=== Out on loan ===
Note: Flags indicate national team as defined under FIFA eligibility rules; some limited exceptions apply. Players may hold more than one non-FIFA nationality.

No.	Pos.	Nation	Player
—	DF	ARG	Franco Russo (at Querétaro until 30 June 2025)
—	DF	ESP	Pipa (at Burgos until 30 June 2025)
—	DF	GAM	Noah Sonko Sundberg (at Sivasspor until 30 June 2025)

No.	Pos.	Nation	Player
—	FW	FRA	Mounir Chouiar (at Zürich until 30 June 2025)
—	FW	ARG	Matías Tissera (at Huracán until 31 December 2025)

=== Second-team squad ===
As of 1 June 2025

Includes reserve team squad regulars that have been called up to the Ludogorets squad for any official competition match. They have either been on the bench or debuted during the current season. Note: Flags indicate national team as defined under FIFA eligibility rules; some limited exceptions apply. Players may hold more than one non-FIFA nationality.

No.	Pos.	Nation	Player
34	DF	BUL	Nikolay Nikolov
42	DF	BUL	Simeon Shishkov
58	DF	BUL	Aleksandar Valekov
63	DF	BUL	Anastas Pemperski
65	GK	BUL	Valentin Valentinov
67	GK	BUL	Damyan Hristov

No.	Pos.	Nation	Player
73	FW	BUL	Filip Gigov
74	FW	BUL	Hyusein Kelyovluev
75	MF	RUS	Yelisey Syrov
80	MF	BUL	Metodiy Stefanov
81	MF	BUL	Georgi Penev
98	FW	BUL	Nasko Yanev

== Transfers ==
=== In ===
Date	Pos.	Player	Transferred from	Fee	Source
29 May 2024	GK	(Germany) Hendrik Bonmann	(Austria) Wolfsberger AC	Free	
17 June 2024	MF	(Cape Verde) Deroy Duarte	(Netherlands) Fortuna Sittard	Free	
22 June 2024	DF	(Sweden) Edvin Kurtulus	(Sweden) Hammarby	Undisclosed	
1 July 2024	DF	(Argentina) Franco Russo	(Belgium) OH Leuven	Loan return	
1 July 2024	DF	(Spain) Pipa	(England) West Bromwich Albion	Loan return	
1 July 2024	FW	(France) Mounir Chouiar	(France) Amiens	Loan return	
16 July 2024	MF	(Guinea) Aguibou Camara	(Greece) Olympiacos	Undisclosed	
14 August 2024	FW	(Bulgaria) Georgi Rusev	(Switzerland) Sion	Loan	
2 September 2024	FW	(Brazil) Erick Marcus	(Brazil) Vasco da Gama	Loan	
25 January 2025	FW	(Colombia) Emerson Rodríguez	(United States) Inter Miami	Undisclosed	
31 January 2025	FW	(Ivory Coast) Eric Bile	(Slovakia) Žilina	Undisclosed	
25 February 2025	FW	(France) Antoine Baroan	(Switzerland) Winterthur	Loan	

=== Out ===
Date	Pos.	Player	Transferred to	Fee	Source
1 July 2024	MF	(Portugal) Claude Gonçalves	(Poland) Legia Warsaw	Free	
1 July 2024	MF	(France) Mounir Chouiar	(Switzerland) Zürich	Loan	
15 July 2024	DF	(Argentina) Franco Russo	(Mexico) Querétaro	Loan	
8 August 2024	DF	(The Gambia) Noah Sonko Sundberg	(Turkey) Sivasspor	Loan	
12 August 2024	DF	(Germany) Marcel Heister	(Croatia) Istra 1961	Free	
31 August 2024	DF	(Spain) Pipa	(Spain) Burgos	Loan	
17 October 2024	GK	(Croatia) Simon Sluga	(Israel) Maccabi Tel Aviv	Free	
31 December 2024	FW	(Bulgaria) Spas Delev	(Bulgaria) Lokomotiv Sofia	Free	
18 January 2025	FW	(Brazil) Rick	(Argentina) Talleres de Córdoba	Undisclosed	
7 February 2025	FW	(Brazil) Rwan Cruz	(Brazil) Botafogo	Undisclosed	
12 February 2025	FW	(Brazil) Raí	(Brazil) Guarani	Free	

== Pre-season and friendlies ==
Win Draw Loss Fixtures

19 June 2024	Ludogorets Razgrad (Bulgaria)	5–0	(Slovenia) Primorje	Wörgl, Austria
16:00 UTC+2	Delev 7'; Rick 12'; Verdon 38'; Witry 42'; Caio Vidal 90'	Report		Stadium: Sportzentrum Wörgl

23 June 2024	Ludogorets Razgrad (Bulgaria)	1–0	(Slovakia) Slovan Bratislava	Straßwalchen, Austria
17:30 UTC+2	Chochev 59'	Report		Stadium: Nevoga-Arena

26 June 2024	Ludogorets Razgrad (Bulgaria)	2–0	(Switzerland) St. Gallen	Zams, Austria
18:00 UTC+2	Chochev 36'; Tekpetey 62'	Report		Stadium: Eurogast-Grissemann-Arena

29 June 2024	Ludogorets Razgrad (Bulgaria)	4–1	(Romania) Universitatea Craiova	Jenbach, Austria
18:00 UTC+2	Caio Vidal 30'; Rick 37'; Son 53'; Chochev 62'	Report	Koljić 66'	Stadium: Stadion Jenbach

7 January 2025	Ludogorets Razgrad (Bulgaria)	1–1	(Romania) Botoșani	Belek, Turkey
17:00 UTC+3	Chochev 66'	Report	Ongenda 80'	Stadium: Regnum Carya Sports Complex

10 January 2025	Ludogorets Razgrad (Bulgaria)	1–0	(Switzerland) Young Boys	Belek, Turkey
17:30 UTC+3	Caio Vidal 89'	Report		Stadium: Regnum Carya Sports Complex

15 January 2025	Ludogorets Razgrad (Bulgaria)	0–4	(Ukraine) Shakhtar Donetsk	Belek, Turkey
17:00 UTC+3		Report	Marlon 17'; Kevin 27'; Eguinaldo 64'; Pedrinho 88'	Stadium: Regnum Carya Sports Complex

== Competitions ==
Competition	First match	Last match	Starting round	Final position	Record							
Competition	First match	Last match	Starting round	Final position	Pld	W	D	L	GF	GA	GD	Win %
First League	21 July 2024	26 May 2025	Matchday 1	Winners	36	25	8	3	70	22	+48	69.44
Bulgarian Cup	31 October 2024	22 May 2025	Round of 32	Winners	6	5	1	0	13	2	+11	83.33
Bulgarian Supercup	4 February 2025		Final	Winners	1	1	0	0	3	2	+1	100.00
UEFA Champions League	10 July 2024	13 August 2024	First qualifying round	Third qualifying round	6	3	0	3	9	11	−2	50.00
UEFA Europa League	22 August 2024	30 January 2025	Play-off round	33rd	10	2	4	4	10	12	−2	20.00
Total					59	36	13	10	105	49	+56	61.02

Source: Soccerway

=== First League ===
==== Regular stage ====
===== League table =====
Pos	Team	Pld	W	D	L	GF	GA	GD	Pts	Qualification
1	Ludogorets Razgrad	30	24	4	2	62	14	+48	76	Qualification for the Championship group
2	Levski Sofia	30	19	5	6	55	25	+30	62	Qualification for the Championship group
3	Arda	30	15	8	7	49	33	+16	53 (Note: Head-to-head points: Arda 4; Cherno More 1.)	Qualification for the Championship group
4	Cherno More	30	14	11	5	41	25	+16	53	Qualification for the Championship group
5	Botev Plovdiv	30	14	7	9	32	31	+1	49	Qualification for the Conference League group

Source: soccerway, Bulgarian Football
Rules for classification: 1) Points; 2) Head-to-head points; 3) Head-to-head goal difference; 4) Head-to-head goals scored; 5) Head-to-head away goals scored (only if two teams); 6) Goal difference; 7) Goals scored; 8) Fairplay ranking; 9) Draw

===== Results summary =====
Overall								Home						Away					
Pld	W	D	L	GF	GA	GD	Pts	W	D	L	GF	GA	GD	W	D	L	GF	GA	GD
30	24	4	2	62	14	+48	76	12	2	0	31	3	+28	12	2	2	31	11	+20

Source: bulgarian-football.com

===== Results by round =====
Round	1	2	3	4	5	6	7	8	9	10	11	12	13	14	15	16	17	18	19	20	21	22	23	24	25	26	27	28	29	30
Ground	H	A	H	A	H	A	H	A	H	A	H	A	H	H	A	A	H	A	H	A	H	A	H	A	H	A	H	A	A	H
Result	W	W	W	W	W	W	D	W	W	W	W	W	W	W	W	D	W	W	W	L	W	D	D	W	W	L	W	W	W	W
Position	7	7	5	6	6	4	4	1	1	1	1	1	1	1	1	1	1	1	1	1	1	1	1	1	1	1	1	1	1	1

Source: bulgarian-football.com
A = Away; H = Home; W = Win; D = Draw; L = Loss

===== Results =====
The league fixtures were unveiled on 13 June 2024.

21 July 2024 1	Ludogorets Razgrad	1–0	CSKA Sofia	Razgrad
21:15 UTC+3	Verdon (yellow card) 33'; Petrov 53' (o.g.)	Report	Heintz (penalty missed) 34'; Sanyang (yellow card) 41'; Vion (yellow card) 45+5'	Stadium: Huvepharma Arena; Attendance: 5,774; Referee: Nikola Popov (Sofia)

3 August 2024 3	Ludogorets Razgrad	5–1	Arda	Razgrad
21:15 UTC+3	Son 8', 73'; Duah 44'; Rwan Cruz 47'; Delev 57'; Kurtulus (yellow card) 87'	Report	Stoev (yellow card) 5'; Eboa Eboa (yellow card) 23', (goal) 88'; Hüseynov (yellow card) 37'; Velkovski (yellow card) 69'	Stadium: Huvepharma Arena; Attendance: 820; Referee: Georgi Davidov (Veliko Tarnovo)

17 August 2024 5	Ludogorets Razgrad	1–0	Levski Sofia	Razgrad
21:15 UTC+3	Ikenna 85' (o.g.); Delev (yellow card) 90'	Report	Ohene (yellow card) 61'; Ikenna (yellow card) 69'	Stadium: Huvepharma Arena; Attendance: 8,831; Referee: Georgi Kabakov (Plovdiv)

25 August 2024 6	Beroe	0–1	Ludogorets Razgrad	Stara Zagora
21:15 UTC+3	Vinícius (yellow card) 24'; Politino (yellow card) 25'; Godoy (yellow card) 63'; Sarriegi (yellow card) 63'; K. Ceijas (yellow card) 87'	Report	Witry (yellow card) 56'; Nedelev 65' (pen.)	Stadium: Beroe; Attendance: 734; Referee: Vladimir Valkov (Plovdiv)

1 September 2024 7	Ludogorets Razgrad	0–0	Cherno More	Razgrad
21:30 UTC+3	Camara (red card) 76'	Report	Iliev (yellow card) 45'; Panayotov (yellow card) 45'; Dimov (yellow card) 83'; Popov (yellow card) 90+3'; Keșerü (yellow card) 90+9'	Stadium: Huvepharma Arena; Attendance: 3,044; Referee: Nikola Popov (Sofia)

15 September 2024 12	Krumovgrad	0–3	Ludogorets Razgrad	Plovdiv (Note: Krumovgrad will host their matches at Nikola Shterev - Starika Sports Complex, Plovdiv, as their own venue, Krumovgrad Stadium, Krumovgrad, does not meet BFU requirements.)
21:30 UTC+3	Katsarov (yellow card) 67'; Ali (yellow card) 73'	Report	Rwan Cruz 9', 59'; Chochev (yellow card) 24'; Erick Marcus 83'	Stadium: Sporten kompleks "Nikola Shterev - Starika"; Attendance: 550; Referee: Martin Velikov (Varna)
Note: Originally scheduled for mid-October, the game was moved forward to mid-September, as the BFU swapped matchdays 8 and 12 in relation to the stadium issue with the Eternal derby.

18 September 2024 2	Slavia Sofia	0–1	Ludogorets Razgrad	Sofia
17:30 UTC+3	Minchev (yellow card) 22'; Genev (yellow card) 54'; Kostov (yellow card) 82'; Kerchev (yellow card) 90+4'	Report	Rick 32'; Duarte (yellow card) 62'	Stadium: Aleksandar Shalamanov; Attendance: 820; Referee: Volen Chinkov (Sofia)
Note: Originally scheduled for 27 July 2024, the match was postponed by the BFU due to Ludogorets' participation in the UCL.

21 September 2024 9	Ludogorets Razgrad	2–0	Lokomotiv Sofia	Razgrad
20:00 UTC+3	Delev 33'; Rwan Cruz 60'	Report	Açka (yellow card) 22'; Dimov (yellow card) 57'; Pitsolis (yellow card) 90'	Stadium: Huvepharma Arena; Attendance: 371; Referee: Valentin Zhelezov (Burgas)

29 September 2024 10	Botev Vratsa	0–2	Ludogorets Razgrad	Razgrad (Note: Botev Vratsa will play their home match against Ludogorets at the Huvepharma Arena, Razgrad, as their own venue, Hristo Botev Stadium, Vratsa, is undergoing pitch renovation.)
21:15 UTC+3	Georgiev (yellow card) 64'; Bachev (yellow card) 68'	Report	Chochev 33'; Rick 39'	Stadium: Huvepharma Arena; Attendance: 870; Referee: Dragomir Draganov (Varna)

6 October 2024 11	Ludogorets Razgrad	1–0	Lokomotiv Plovdiv	Razgrad
20:00 UTC+3	Camara (yellow card) 54'; Rick 84'; Verdon (yellow card) 89'	Report	Karakashev (yellow card) 17'; Lyaskov (yellow card) 29'; Perea (yellow card) 75'; Kamdem (yellow card) 79'; Kostov (yellow card) 82'; Iliev (yellow card) 89'; Petkov (yellow card) 90+3'	Stadium: Huvepharma Arena; Attendance: 810; Referee: Krasen Georgiev (Varna)

20 October 2024 8	Septemvri Sofia	0–2	Ludogorets Razgrad	Sofia
19:15 UTC+3	Varbanov (red card) 20'	Report	Camara (yellow card) 36'; Rwan Cruz 45+1'; Hristov 55' (o.g.)	Stadium: Lokomotiv (Note: Septemvri Sofia will host their matches at Lokomotiv Stadium, Sofia, as their own venue, Dragalevtsi Stadium, Sofia, does not meet BFU requirements.); Attendance: 233; Referee: Kristiyan Kolev (Plovdiv)
Note: Originally scheduled for mid-September, the game was pushed back to mid-October, as the BFU swapped matchdays 8 and 12 in relation to the stadium issue with the Eternal derby.

28 October 2024 13	Ludogorets Razgrad	3–0	CSKA 1948	Razgrad
18:00 UTC+2	Erick Marcus 15', 49'; Chochev 24'	Report	Ilievski (yellow card) 41'; Thalis (yellow card) 44'	Stadium: Huvepharma Arena; Attendance: 229; Referee: Georgi Kabakov (Plovdiv)

3 November 2024 14	Ludogorets Razgrad	3–0	Hebar	Razgrad
15:00 UTC+2	Duarte 14'; Erick Marcus 33'; Chochev 45'	Report	Gamakov (yellow card) 35'; Zbun (yellow card) 61'	Stadium: Huvepharma Arena; Attendance: 921; Referee: Stoyan Arsov (Sofia)

10 November 2024 15	Spartak Varna	1–3	Ludogorets Razgrad	Varna
17:30 UTC+2	Ahmedov 45+3' (pen.); Ivey (yellow card) 70'; Lesniak (yellow card) 85'	Report	Son 9'; Rwan Cruz 64'; Verdon 80'	Stadium: Spartak; Attendance: 1,910; Referee: Georgi Ginchev (Veliko Tarnovo)

24 November 2024 16	CSKA Sofia	2–2	Ludogorets Razgrad	Sofia
17:00 UTC+2	Lindseth (yellow card) 15'; Koyalipou 32'; Vion (yellow card) 45+2'; Dyulgerov (yellow card) 47'; Dellova (yellow card) 87'; Phaëton 90+1'	Report	Rwan Cruz (yellow card) 5'; Erick Marcus 8'; Yordanov (yellow card) 14'; Verdon (yellow card) 45+1'; Chochev 73'	Stadium: Natsionalen stadion Vasil Levski (Note: CSKA Sofia will host their matches at the Vasil Levski National Stadium, Sofia, as their own venue, Balgarska Armia Stadium, Sofia, is undergoing major reconstruction.); Attendance: 15,000; Referee: Georgi Kabakov (Plovdiv)

1 December 2024 17	Ludogorets Razgrad	2–0	Slavia Sofia	Razgrad
17:30 UTC+2	Piotrowski 39'; Naressi (yellow card) 80'; Rwan Cruz 82'	Report		Stadium: Huvepharma Arena; Attendance: 727; Referee: Dimitar Dimitrov (Sofia)

4 December 2024 18	Arda	0–4	Ludogorets Razgrad	Kardzhali
15:00 UTC+2	Idowu (yellow card) 86'; Aksaka (yellow card) 90+2'	Report	Rwan Cruz 10'; Son 36'; Caio Vidal 76'; Almeida 87'	Stadium: Arena Arda; Attendance: 1,192; Referee: Valentin Zhelezov (Burgas)

8 December 2024 19	Ludogorets Razgrad	3–0	Botev Plovdiv	Razgrad
17:00 UTC+2	Almeida 12'; Naressi 69'; Duah 80' (pen.); Chochev (yellow card) 88'	Report	Iliev (yellow card) 53'; Tamm (yellow card) 54'; Balogiannis (yellow card) 66'; Conte (yellow card) 80'	Stadium: Huvepharma Arena; Attendance: 1,442; Referee: Krasen Georgiev (Varna)

19 December 2024 4	Botev Plovdiv	2–4	Ludogorets Razgrad	Plovdiv
17:00 UTC+2	Akere 5'; Maraš 63' (pen.)	Report	Rwan Cruz 20', 40'; Rick 45+1'; Piotrowski 55'; Verdon (yellow card) 62'; Duah (yellow card) 85'	Stadium: Hristo Botev; Attendance: 5,045; Referee: Dragomir Draganov (Varna)
Note: Originally scheduled for 11 August 2024, the match was postponed by the BFU due to both teams' participation in European competitions.

9 February 2025 20	Levski Sofia	2–1	Ludogorets Razgrad	Sofia
17:15 UTC+2	El Jemili 34'; Marković (yellow card) 60'; Everton 62'; Myslovič (yellow card) 68'; Mitkov (yellow card) 90+1'; Maicon (yellow card) 90+7'	Report	Kurtulus (yellow card) 29'; Verdon 90+3' (pen.)	Stadium: Georgi Asparuhov; Attendance: 8,678; Referee: Radoslav Gidzhenov (Plovdiv)

16 February 2025 21	Ludogorets Razgrad	2–1	Beroe	Razgrad
15:00 UTC+2	Verdon (penalty missed) 38', (yellow card) 53'; Caio Vidal 46', 70'; Piotrowski (yellow card) 58'	Report	Mi. Georgiev (yellow card) 35'; Ramos Mingo (yellow card) 53' (yellow-red card) 90'; Ma. Georgiev (yellow card) 77'; Salido 85'	Stadium: Huvepharma Arena; Attendance: 350; Referee: Ivo Andreev (Sofia)

22 February 2025 22	Cherno More	1–1	Ludogorets Razgrad	Varna
17:30 UTC+2	Zlatev 45+2'; Isa (yellow card) 90+1'	Report	Piotrowski 36' (pen.); Erick Marcus (yellow card) 90+1'	Stadium: Ticha; Attendance: 520; Referee: Valentin Zhelezov (Burgas)

3 March 2025 23	Ludogorets Razgrad	0–0	Septemvri Sofia	Razgrad
17:30 UTC+2	Almeida (yellow card) 81'; Naressi (yellow card) 86'	Report	Amade (yellow card) 66'; G. Ivanov (yellow card) 70'	Stadium: Huvepharma Arena; Attendance: 789; Referee: Denislav Stalev (Plovdiv)

9 March 2025 24	Lokomotiv Sofia	1–2	Ludogorets Razgrad	Sofia
17:00 UTC+2	Bidounga (yellow card) 2'; Celso (yellow card) 9' (yellow-red card) 29'; Katsarov (yellow card) 66'; Aralica 82'; Octávio (yellow card) 90+5'	Report	Baroan 34'; Naressi 53'; Duarte (yellow card) 86'	Stadium: Lokomotiv; Attendance: 895; Referee: Georgi Kabakov (Plovdiv)

15 March 2025 25	Ludogorets Razgrad	3–0	Botev Vratsa	Razgrad
15:00 UTC+2	Nedelev 4', (yellow card) 39'; Piotrowski (yellow card) 27', (goal) 57'; Rusev 90'	Report	Boukassi (yellow card) 33'; Kabashi (yellow card) 56'	Stadium: Huvepharma Arena; Attendance: 1,000; Referee: Stoyan Arsov (Sofia)

30 March 2025 26	Lokomotiv Plovdiv	1–0	Ludogorets Razgrad	Plovdiv
16:00 UTC+3	Lamy 12' (pen.); Kostov (yellow card) 33'; Medved (yellow card) 39'; Perea (yellow card) 43' (yellow-red card) 86'; Stępiński (yellow card) 75'; Bizjak (yellow card) 90+7'	Report	Nedyalkov (yellow card) 52'	Stadium: Lokomotiv; Attendance: 0 (Note: The match was played behind closed doors due to a ban imposed on Lokomotiv Plovdiv by the BFU.); Referee: Georgi Ginchev (Veliko Tarnovo)

3 April 2025 27	Ludogorets Razgrad	3–0	Krumovgrad	Razgrad
17:00 UTC+3	Witry 22', (yellow card) 78'; Erick Marcus 51'; Caio Vidal (red card) 56'; Piotrowski 82'	Report	Rabotov (yellow card) 14'; Dobrev (yellow card) 66'; Itu (yellow card) 72'	Stadium: Huvepharma Arena; Attendance: 520; Referee: Mariyan Grebencharski (Samokov)

7 April 2025 28	CSKA 1948	1–3	Ludogorets Razgrad	Bistritsa
20:00 UTC+3	Serdyuk (yellow card) 80'; Kirilov 90+1'	Report	Son 39'; Rusev (yellow card) 81'; Duah 82'; Rodríguez 90+5'	Stadium: Bistritsa; Attendance: 200; Referee: Nikola Popov (Sofia)

14 April 2025 29	Hebar	0–2	Ludogorets Razgrad	Pazardzhik
20:00 UTC+3	Makni (yellow card) 40'; N'Zi (yellow card) 62'	Report	Nedyalkov (yellow card) 29'; Verdon (yellow card) 45+2'; Son (yellow card) 53'; Camara (yellow card) 60'; Piotrowski (yellow card) 72'; Erick Marcus 78'; Caio Vidal (yellow card) 82', (goal) 89'	Stadium: Georgi Benkovski; Attendance: 700; Referee: Radoslav Gidzhenov (Plovdiv)

19 April 2025 30	Ludogorets Razgrad	2–1	Spartak Varna	Razgrad
19:00 UTC+3	Piotrowski 9'; Duah (yellow card) 70', (goal) 87'; Caio Vidal (yellow card) 73'	Report	Xandy (yellow card) 52'; Mitkov 76'	Stadium: Huvepharma Arena; Attendance: 1,022; Referee: Mihael Pavlov (Veliko Tarnovo)

==== Championship stage ====
===== Table =====
Pos	Team	Pld	W	D	L	GF	GA	GD	Pts	Qualification
1	Ludogorets Razgrad (C)	36	25	8	3	70	22	+48	83	Qualification for the Champions League first qualifying round
2	Levski Sofia	36	21	9	6	64	29	+35	72	Qualification for the Europa League first qualifying round (Note: As Ludogorets Razgrad won the 2024–25 Bulgarian Cup, the cup's Europa League first qualifying round berth was passed to the second-placed team in the First League.)
3	Cherno More	36	15	14	7	44	30	+14	59	Qualification for the Conference League second qualifying round
4	Arda (O)	36	15	13	8	54	41	+13	58	Qualification for the Conference League play-off

Source: soccerway, Bulgarian Football
Rules for classification: 1) Points; 2) Head-to-head points; 3) Head-to-head goal difference; 4) Head-to-head goals scored; 5) Head-to-head away goals scored (only if two teams); 6) Goal difference; 7) Goals scored; 8) Fairplay ranking; 9) Draw
(C) Champions; (O) Play-off winners

===== Results summary =====
Overall								Home						Away					
Pld	W	D	L	GF	GA	GD	Pts	W	D	L	GF	GA	GD	W	D	L	GF	GA	GD
6	1	4	1	8	8	0	7	1	2	0	5	3	+2	0	2	1	3	5	−2

Source: See results

===== Results by round =====
Round	1	2	3	4	5	6
Ground	H	H	A	A	A	H
Result	W	D	D	L	D	D
Position	1	1	1	1	1	1

Source: See Results
A = Away; H = Home; W = Win; D = Draw; L = Loss

===== Matches =====
27 April 2025 31	Ludogorets Razgrad	2–0	Cherno More	Razgrad
20:30 UTC+3	Verdon 45+2'; Duah 68'	Report	Popov (yellow card) 15'; Donchev (yellow card) 19'; Weslen (yellow card) 54'; Drobarov (yellow card) 73'; Stefanov (yellow card) 87'	Stadium: Huvepharma Arena; Attendance: 1,200; Referee: Georgi Kabakov (Plovdiv)

3 May 2025 32	Ludogorets Razgrad	1–1	Levski Sofia	Razgrad
19:30 UTC+3	Erick Marcus 34'; Kurtulus (yellow card) 77'	Report	Ohene (yellow card) 45'; Everton 79'	Stadium: Huvepharma Arena; Attendance: 4,677; Referee: Dragomir Draganov (Varna)

9 May 2025 33	Arda	1–1	Ludogorets Razgrad	Kardzhali
17:45 UTC+3	S. Ivanov (yellow card) 44'; Yordanov 66'; Kovachev (yellow card) 78'	Report	Almeida 52'; Duah (yellow card) 88'	Stadium: Arena Arda; Attendance: 650; Referee: Radoslav Gidzhenov (Plovdiv)

13 May 2025 34	Cherno More	2–0	Ludogorets Razgrad	Varna
17:45 UTC+3	Zlatev 60'; Weslen 67'; Milushev (yellow card) 89'	Report		Stadium: Ticha; Attendance: 2,789; Referee: Vasil Minev (Sofia)

17 May 2025 35	Levski Sofia	2–2	Ludogorets Razgrad	Sofia
20:00 UTC+3	Mitkov (yellow card) 40'; Sangaré (yellow card) 45+1'; Kamdem 61', (yellow card) 62'; El Jemili 68' van der Kaap (yellow card) 70'; Maicon (yellow card) 84'; Kostadinov (yellow card) 90+3'	Report	Bile 36', (yellow card) 36'; Piotrowski (red card) 39'; Chochev 77'	Stadium: Georgi Asparuhov; Attendance: 5,000; Referee: Volen Chinkov (Sofia)

26 May 2025 36	Ludogorets Razgrad	2–2	Arda	Razgrad
17:45 UTC+3	Tekpetey 33' (pen.); Bile 77'; I. Yordanov (yellow card) 89'	Report	S. Ivanov 6'; Tsonev (yellow card) 79'; T. Yordanov 85'	Stadium: Huvepharma Arena; Attendance: 450; Referee: Vladimir Valkov (Plovdiv)

=== Bulgarian Cup ===
31 October 2024 Round of 32	Chernolomets Popovo	0–6	Ludogorets Razgrad	Razgrad (Note: Chernolomets Popovo requested to play its Round of 32 home match at Huvepharma Arena, Razgrad, instead of their regular stadium, Stamo Kostov Stadium in Popovo.)
17:00 UTC+2	Bratoev (yellow card) 67'; Petkov (yellow card) 74'	Report	Rusev 14'; Tissera 18'; Caio Vidal 37', 82'; Camara 41'; Delev 54'	Stadium: Huvepharma Arena; Attendance: 50; Referee: Mihael Pavlov (Veliko Tarnovo)

16 December 2024 Round of 16	CSKA 1948	2–3	Ludogorets Razgrad	Bistritsa
16:00 UTC+2	Kirilov 12', 63'; Vitanov (yellow card) 42'; Rapnouil (yellow card) 61'; Thalis (yellow card) 69'; Ilievski (yellow card) 79'	Report	Duah (yellow card) 24'; Camara 35'; Kurtulus 77'; Chochev 90+2'	Stadium: Bistritsa; Attendance: 110; Referee: Vasil Minev (Sofia)

27 February 2025 Quarterfinal	Ludogorets Razgrad	0–0 (a.e.t.) (4–2 p)	Botev Plovdiv	Razgrad
18:00 UTC+2	Duarte (yellow card) 37'; Almeida (yellow card) 103'	Report	Popov (yellow card) 72'; Bernat (yellow card) 120+1'	Stadium: Huvepharma Arena; Attendance: 1,022; Referee: Krasen Georgiev (Varna)
	Penalties
	Piotrowski (penalty scored); Rusev (penalty scored); Yordanov (penalty scored); Erick Marcus (penalty scored)		(penalty scored) Iliev; (penalty missed) Balogiannis; (penalty missed) Chernev; (penalty scored) Maraš

10 April 2025 Semifinal 1st leg	Botev Vratsa	0–1	Ludogorets Razgrad	Vratsa
19:00 UTC+3		Report	Kurtulus (yellow card) 45'; Duah 65'	Stadium: Hristo Botev; Attendance: 1,121; Referee: Dragomir Draganov (Varna)

23 April 2025 Semifinal 2nd leg	Ludogorets Razgrad	2–0 (3–0 agg.)	Botev Vratsa	Razgrad
19:00 UTC+3	Camara 6'; Baroan 22'; Bile (yellow card) 90+3'	Report	Ewerton (yellow card) 14'; Traorè (yellow card) 50'	Stadium: Huvepharma Arena; Attendance: 1,985; Referee: Volen Chinkov (Sofia)

22 May 2025 Final	Ludogorets Razgrad	1–0	CSKA Sofia	Sofia
19:00 UTC+3	Caio Vidal (yellow card) 32', (goal) 34'; Verdon (yellow card) 68'; Padt (yellow card) 74'; Rusev (yellow card) 77'; Camara (yellow card) 90+6'	Report	Lapeña (yellow card) 18'	Stadium: Natsionalen stadion Vasil Levski; Attendance: 37,455; Referee: Georgi Kabakov (Plovdiv)

=== Bulgarian Supercup ===
4 February 2025	Ludogorets Razgrad	3–2	Botev Plovdiv	Plovdiv
18:00 UTC+2	Naressi (yellow card) 30'; Piotrowski (yellow card) 30', (goal) 70'; Almeida 66'; Caio Vidal (yellow card) 75'; Chochev 90+2'	Report	Balogiannis (yellow card) 31'; Karabelyov (yellow card) 34'; Akere 60'; Minkov (yellow card) 64'; Maraš 84'; Korošec (yellow card) 90+1'	Stadium: Hristo Botev; Attendance: 6,777; Referee: Dragomir Draganov (Varna)

=== UEFA Champions League ===
==== Qualifying rounds ====
10 July 2024 First qualifying round 1st leg	Ludogorets Razgrad (Bulgaria)	3–1	(Georgia (country)) Dinamo Batumi	Razgrad, Bulgaria
21:00 UTC+3	Tekpetey 13'; Rick 24'; Witry 72'	Report	Santos (yellow card) 32'; Kharabadze (yellow card) 45+1'; Mamuchashvili 62'; Gudushauri (yellow card) 85'	Stadium: Huvepharma Arena; Attendance: 4,561; Referee: Robert Schröder (Germany)

17 July 2024 First qualifying round 2nd leg	Dinamo Batumi (Georgia (country))	1–0 (2–3 agg.)	(Bulgaria) Ludogorets Razgrad	Batumi, Georgia
21:00 UTC+4	Mamuchashvili 3'	Report	Naressi (yellow card) 45+4'; Tekpetey (yellow card) 49'; Rick (yellow card) 66'; Witry (yellow card) 68'; Piotrowski (yellow card) 83'	Stadium: Adjarabet Arena; Attendance: 14,967; Referee: Dario Bel (Croatia)

24 July 2024 Second qualifying round 1st leg	Ludogorets Razgrad (Bulgaria)	2–0	(Belarus) Dinamo Minsk	Razgrad, Bulgaria
21:00 UTC+3	Tekpetey 9'; Nedyalkov (yellow card) 36'; Nedelev 45+1' (pen.); Verdon (yellow card) 57'; Caio Vidal (yellow card) 86'	Report	Hawrylovich (yellow card) 18'; Selyava (yellow card) 20'; Pigas (yellow card) 24'; Melnichenko (yellow card) 41'; Politevich (yellow card) 45'	Stadium: Huvepharma Arena; Attendance: 5,323; Referee: Eldorjan Hamiti (Albania)

31 July 2024 Second qualifying round 2nd leg	Dinamo Minsk (Belarus)	1–0 (1–2 agg.)	(Bulgaria) Ludogorets Razgrad	Mezőkövesd, Hungary (Note: Due to the country's involvement in the Russian invasion of Ukraine, Belarusian teams were required to play their home matches at neutral venues and behind closed doors until further notice.)
20:45 UTC+2	Kalinin (yellow card) 21'; Bakhar 37'; Selyava (yellow card) 41'; Demchenko (yellow card) 45'; Sedko (yellow card) 75'; Melnichenko (yellow card) 84'	Report	Bonmann (yellow card) 90+3'	Stadium: Mezőkövesdi Városi Stadion; Attendance: 10; Referee: Yigal Frid (Israel)

6 August 2024 Third qualifying round 1st leg	Qarabağ (Azerbaijan)	1–2	(Bulgaria) Ludogorets Razgrad	Baku, Azerbaijan
20:00 UTC+4	Romão (yellow card) 11'; Juninho (yellow card) 41', (goal) 65'	Report	Verdon (yellow card) 34'; Caio Vidal (yellow card) 45+4' (yellow-red card) 89', (goal) 87'; Almeida 56'; Duarte (yellow card) 90+3'	Stadium: Tofiq Bahramov Republican Stadium; Attendance: 29,300; Referee: Urs Schnyder (Switzerland)

13 August 2024 Third qualifying round 2nd leg	Ludogorets Razgrad (Bulgaria)	2–7 (a.e.t.) (4–8 agg.)	(Azerbaijan) Qarabağ	Razgrad, Bulgaria
21:00 UTC+3	Duah 13', 23' (pen.); Duarte (yellow card) 89'; Rick (yellow card) 90+3'; Nedyalkov (yellow card) 107'	Report	Juninho 7'; Mustafazade (yellow card) 28'; Benzia 45+1' (pen.), 118', (yellow card) 104'; P. Andrade 45+5', 112'; Silva (yellow card) 54'; Romão (yellow card) 85'; Zoubir (yellow card) 87'; Vešović (yellow card) 89'; Bayramov 93'; Xhixha 111'	Stadium: Huvepharma Arena; Attendance: 7,700; Referee: Simone Sozza (Italy)

=== UEFA Europa League ===
==== Qualifying rounds ====
22 August 2024 Play-off round 1st leg	Ludogorets Razgrad (Bulgaria)	4–0	(Moldova) Petrocub Hîncești	Razgrad, Bulgaria
21:00 UTC+3	Duah 23'; Piotrowski (yellow card) 51'; Rwan Cruz 59'; Almeida 90+1', 90+4'	Report	M. Plătică (yellow card) 28'	Stadium: Huvepharma Arena; Attendance: 3,965; Referee: Anastasios Papapetrou (Greece)

29 August 2024 Play-off round 2nd leg	Petrocub Hîncești (Moldova)	1–2 (1–6 agg.)	(Bulgaria) Ludogorets Razgrad	Chișinău, Moldova (Note: Petrocub Hîncești played their home matches at the Zimbru Stadium in Chișinău, instead of their regular stadium, the Municipal Stadium in Hîncești, which did not meet UEFA requirements.)
20:00 UTC+3	Jardan (yellow card) 7'; Ambros 28', (yellow card) 48'; Pușcaș (yellow card) 35'; Mudrac (yellow card) 58' (yellow-red card) 58'; Căruntu (yellow card) 90+2'	Report	Camara (yellow card) 30'; Delev 75'; Yordanov (yellow card) 81'; Rick 90+3'	Stadium: Zimbru; Attendance: 4,576; Referee: Sascha Stegemann (Germany)

==== League phase ====
The league phase draw was held on 30 August 2024.

Pos	Team	Pld	W	D	L	GF	GA	GD	Pts
31	(Swedish Football Association) Malmö FF	8	1	2	5	10	17	−7	5
32	(Latvian Football Federation) RFS	8	1	2	5	6	13	−7	5
33	(Bulgarian Football Union) Ludogorets Razgrad	8	0	4	4	4	11	−7	4
34	(Ukrainian Association of Football) Dynamo Kyiv	8	1	1	6	5	18	−13	4
35	(French Football Federation) Nice	8	0	3	5	7	16	−9	3

Source: UEFA
Rules for classification: League phase tiebreakers

Overall								Home						Away					
Pld	W	D	L	GF	GA	GD	Pts	W	D	L	GF	GA	GD	W	D	L	GF	GA	GD
8	0	4	4	4	11	−7	4	0	1	3	3	8	−5	0	3	1	1	3	−2

Source: UEFA

Round	1	2	3	4	5	6	7	8
Ground	H	A	A	H	A	H	H	A
Result	L	D	L	L	D	D	L	D
Position	30	28	33	34	33	32	33	33

Source: UEFA
A = Away; H = Home; W = Win; D = Draw; L = Loss

25 September 2024 1	Ludogorets Razgrad (Bulgaria)	0–2	(Czech Republic) Slavia Prague	Razgrad, Bulgaria
22:00 UTC+3	Naressi (yellow card) 22'; Caio Vidal (yellow card) 41'	Report	Chorý (yellow card) 14'; Jurásek 37'; Chytil 65'; Diouf (yellow card) 70'; Bořil (yellow card) 85'	Stadium: Huvepharma Arena; Attendance: 4,761; Referee: Jérôme Brisard (France)

3 October 2024 2	Viktoria Plzeň (Czech Republic)	0–0	(Bulgaria) Ludogorets Razgrad	Plzeň, Czech Republic
21:00 UTC+2	Kalvach (yellow card) 46'; Šulc (yellow card) 79'	Report	Piotrowski (penalty missed) 52'; Son (yellow card) 90+3'; Rick (yellow card) 90+3'; Naressi (yellow card) 90+6'	Stadium: Doosan Arena; Attendance: 10,317; Referee: Tamás Bognár (Hungary)

24 October 2024 3	Anderlecht (Belgium)	2–0	(Bulgaria) Ludogorets Razgrad	Brussels, Belgium
21:00 UTC+2	Degreef (yellow card) 28'; Edozie 67'; Foket (yellow card) 80'; Sardella (yellow card) 89'; Dreyer 90+4'	Report	Caio Vidal (red card) 30'; Verdon (yellow card) 41'; Chochev (yellow card) 45+3'; Naressi (yellow card) 45+4'; Rick (yellow card) 45+5'; Bonmann (yellow card) 64'; Padt (yellow card) 90+7'	Stadium: Constant Vanden Stock; Attendance: 18,000; Referee: Filip Glova (Slovakia)

7 November 2024 4	Ludogorets Razgrad (Bulgaria)	1–2	(Spain) Athletic Bilbao	Razgrad, Bulgaria
19:45 UTC+2	Erick Marcus 20'; Rick (yellow card) 30'; Rusev (yellow card) 77'; Rwan Cruz (yellow card) 90+4'	Report	Berchiche (yellow card) 23'; Vivian (yellow card) 48'; Vesga (yellow card) 72'; I. Williams 73'; Serrano 74', (yellow card) 90+4'	Stadium: Huvepharma Arena; Attendance: 9,725; Referee: Anastasios Papapetrou (Greece)

28 November 2024 5	Lazio (Italy)	0–0	(Bulgaria) Ludogorets Razgrad	Rome, Italy
18:45 UTC+1	Pellegrini (yellow card) 28'; Tchaouna (yellow card) 42'; Gigot (yellow card) 60'; Rovella (yellow card) 73'; Patric (yellow card) 73'; Isaksen (yellow card) 84'	Report	Kurtulus (yellow card) 36'; Naressi (yellow card) 81'	Stadium: Stadio Olimpico; Attendance: 27,259; Referee: Duje Strukan (Croatia)

12 December 2024 6	Ludogorets Razgrad (Bulgaria)	2–2	(Netherlands) AZ	Razgrad, Bulgaria
19:45 UTC+2	Chochev 60', (yellow card) 84'; Duah 63'; Naressi (yellow card) 88'	Report	van Bommel 14'; Maikuma 19'; Goes (yellow card) 48'; Koopmeiners (yellow card) 49'; Møller Wolfe (yellow card) 66'	Stadium: Huvepharma Arena; Attendance: 4,245; Referee: Kristo Tohver (Estonia)

23 January 2025 7	Ludogorets Razgrad (Bulgaria)	0–2	(Denmark) Midtjylland	Razgrad, Bulgaria
22:00 UTC+2	Piotrowski (yellow card) 28'; Verdon (yellow card) 43'	Report	Osorio 18'; Mbabu (yellow card) 53'; Chilufya (yellow card) 80'; Byskov 90+5'	Stadium: Huvepharma Arena; Attendance: 3,847; Referee: Mohammed Al-Hakim (Sweden)

30 January 2024 8	Lyon (France)	1–1	(Bulgaria) Ludogorets Razgrad	Décines-Charpieu, France
20:00 UTC+1	Nuamah (yellow card) 37'; Tolisso 54'	Report	Erick Marcus (yellow card) 72'; Almeida 77'; Piotrowski (yellow card) 83'	Stadium: Groupama Stadium; Attendance: 35,488; Referee: Tasos Sidiropoulos (Greece)

== Squad statistics ==
=== Appearances and goals ===
No.	Pos	Nat	Player	Total		First League		Bulgarian Cup		Bulgarian Supercup		Champions League		Europa League	
No.	Pos	Nat	Player	Apps	Goals	Apps	Goals	Apps	Goals	Apps	Goals	Apps	Goals	Apps	Goals
1	GK	(Netherlands) NED	Sergio Padt	0	0	0	0	0	0	0	0	0	0	0	0
3	DF	(Bulgaria) BUL	Anton Nedyalkov	0	0	0	0	0	0	0	0	0	0	0	0
4	DF	(Portugal) POR	Dinis Almeida	0	0	0	0	0	0	0	0	0	0	0	0
5	DF	(Bulgaria) BUL	Georgi Terziev	0	0	0	0	0	0	0	0	0	0	0	0
6	MF	(Poland) POL	Jakub Piotrowski	0	0	0	0	0	0	0	0	0	0	0	0
7	FW	(Brazil) BRA	Rick	0	0	0	0	0	0	0	0	0	0	0	0
8	MF	(Bulgaria) BUL	Todor Nedelev	0	0	0	0	0	0	0	0	0	0	0	0
9	FW	(Switzerland) SUI	Kwadwo Duah	0	0	0	0	0	0	0	0	0	0	0	0
10	FW	(Argentina) ARG	Matías Tissera	0	0	0	0	0	0	0	0	0	0	0	0
11	FW	(Brazil) BRA	Caio Vidal	0	0	0	0	0	0	0	0	0	0	0	0
12	FW	(Brazil) BRA	Rwan Cruz	0	0	0	0	0	0	0	0	0	0	0	0
14	DF	(Israel) ISR	Denny Gropper	0	0	0	0	0	0	0	0	0	0	0	0
15	DF	(Sweden) SWE	Edvin Kurtulus	0	0	0	0	0	0	0	0	0	0	0	0
16	DF	(Norway) NOR	Aslak Fonn Witry	0	0	0	0	0	0	0	0	0	0	0	0
17	DF	(Spain) ESP	Son	0	0	0	0	0	0	0	0	0	0	0	0
18	MF	(Bulgaria) BUL	Ivaylo Chochev	0	0	0	0	0	0	0	0	0	0	0	0
19	FW	(Bulgaria) BUL	Georgi Rusev	0	0	0	0	0	0	0	0	0	0	0	0
20	MF	(Guinea) GUI	Aguibou Camara	0	0	0	0	0	0	0	0	0	0	0	0
23	MF	(Cape Verde) CPV	Deroy Duarte	0	0	0	0	0	0	0	0	0	0	0	0
24	DF	(Benin) BEN	Olivier Verdon	0	0	0	0	0	0	0	0	0	0	0	0
30	MF	(Brazil) BRA	Pedro Naressi	0	0	0	0	0	0	0	0	0	0	0	0
37	FW	(Ghana) GHA	Bernard Tekpetey	0	0	0	0	0	0	0	0	0	0	0	0
37	GK	(Germany) GER	Hendrik Bonmann	0	0	0	0	0	0	0	0	0	0	0	0
67	GK	(Bulgaria) BUL	Damyan Hristov	0	0	0	0	0	0	0	0	0	0	0	0
75	MF	(Russia) RUS	Elisey Syrov	0	0	0	0	0	0	0	0	0	0	0	0
77	FW	(Brazil) BRA	Erick Marcus	0	0	0	0	0	0	0	0	0	0	0	0
82	MF	(Bulgaria) BUL	Ivan Yordanov	0	0	0	0	0	0	0	0	0	0	0	0
90	FW	(Bulgaria) BUL	Spas Delev	0	0	0	0	0	0	0	0	0	0	0	0
Other players under contract:
	FW	(Brazil) BRA	Raí	0	0	0	0	0	0	0	0	0	0	0	0
Players from the reserve team:
Players away on loan:
2	DF	(Spain) ESP	Pipa	0	0	0	0	0	0	0	0	0	0	0	0
11	FW	(France) FRA	Mounir Chouiar	0	0	0	0	0	0	0	0	0	0	0	0
22	DF	(Argentina) ARG	Franco Russo	0	0	0	0	0	0	0	0	0	0	0	0
26	DF	(The Gambia) GAM	Noah Sonko Sundberg	0	0	0	0	0	0	0	0	0	0	0	0
	DF	(Brazil) BRA	Pedro Henrique	0	0	0	0	0	0	0	0	0	0	0	0
Players that left during the season:
	GK	(Croatia) CRO	Simon Sluga	0	0	0	0	0	0	0	0	0	0	0	0
	DF	(Germany) GER	Marcel Heister	0	0	0	0	0	0	0	0	0	0	0	0

=== Goalscorers ===
Place	Position	Nation	Number	Name	First League	Bulgarian Cup	Bulgarian Supercup	Champions League	Europa League	Total
Totals					0	0	0	0	0	0

^{†} Player left the club during the season.

=== Clean sheets ===
Place	Position	Nation	Number	Name	First League	Bulgarian Cup	Bulgarian Supercup	Champions League	Europa League	Total
1	GK	(Netherlands)	1	Sergio Padt	0	0	0	0	0	0
2	GK	(Germany)	39	Hendrik Bonmann	0	0	0	0	0	0
Totals					0	0	0	0	0	0

=== Disciplinary record ===
Number	Nation	Position	Name	First League		Bulgarian Cup		Bulgarian Supercup		Champions League		Europa League		Total	
Number	Nation	Position	Name	Yellow card	Red card	Yellow card	Red card	Yellow card	Red card	Yellow card	Red card	Yellow card	Red card	Yellow card	Red card
Players away on loan:
Players who left during the season:
			Totals	0	0	0	0	0	0	0	0	0	0	0	0
