= 2025 Bulgarian Cup final =

Финал на Sesame Купа на България 2025
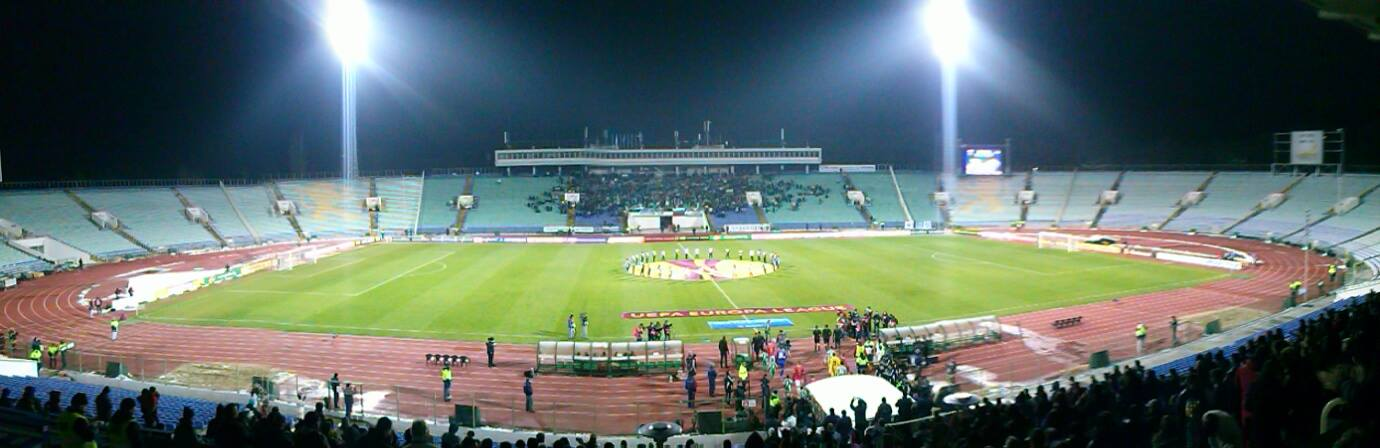
- Event: 2024–25 Bulgarian Cup
Ludogorets Razgrad	CSKA Sofia
1	0
- Date: 22 May 2025
- Venue: Vasil Levski, Sofia
- Referee: Georgi Kabakov (Plovdiv)
- Attendance: 37,455
- Weather: Fair; 22 °C (72 °F)

The 2025 Bulgarian Cup final was the final match of the 2024–25 Bulgarian Cup and the 85th final of the Bulgarian Cup. The final took place on 22 May 2025 at the Vasil Levski National Stadium in Sofia. On 24 April the date and venue has been confirmed.

The clubs contesting the final were Ludogorets Razgrad and CSKA Sofia. Both teams have met on multiple occasions in the competition but never in the final itself. For Ludogorets, this is the third consecutive Cup final after winning the trophy in 2023 and losing last year. CSKA reached the final for the 36th time and the first since 2022.

Ludogorets won the final 1–0 for their fourth cup title following their triumphs in 2012, 2014 and 2023. As they were already assured of a participation in the UEFA Champions League as 2024–25 First League champions, their berth for the first qualifying round of 2025–26 UEFA Europa League was passed to the First League runners-up, Levski Sofia.

== Route to the final ==
Ludogorets			Round	CSKA
Opponent	Result	Legs		Opponent	Result	Legs
Chernolomets Popovo	6–0	away	First round	Dobrudzha	4–0	away
CSKA 1948	3–2	away	Second round	Spartak Varna	3–2	away
Botev Plovdiv	0–0 (a.e.t.), (4–2 p)	home	Quarter-finals	Arda	2–1	home
Botev Vratsa	3–0	1–0 away; 2–0 home	Semi-finals	Cherno More	2–1	0–0 away; 2–1 home

== Match ==
=== Details ===
22 May 2025
19:00 UTC+3

Ludogorets Razgrad	1−0	CSKA Sofia
Caio Vidal 34'	Report

Vasil Levski National Stadium, Sofia
Attendance: 37,455
Referee: Georgi Kabakov (Plovdiv)

Ludogorets	CSKA

GK	1	(Netherlands) Sergio Padt	(yellow card) 74'
RB	17	(Spain) Son
CB	15	(Sweden) Edvin Kurtulus
CB	24	(Benin) Olivier Verdon	(yellow card) 68'
LB	3	(Bulgaria) Anton Nedyalkov (c)
CM	23	(Cape Verde) Deroy Duarte
CM	18	(Bulgaria) Ivaylo Chochev	(substituted off) 90+1'
CM	20	(Guinea) Aguibou Camara	(yellow card) 90+6'
RW	77	(Brazil) Erick Marcus	(substituted off) 76'
CF	9	(Switzerland) Kwadwo Duah	(substituted off) 85'
LW	11	(Brazil) Caio Vidal	(yellow card) 32'	(substituted off) 90+2'
Substitutes:
GK	39	(Germany) Hendrik Bonmann
DF	4	(Portugal) Dinis Almeida	(substituted on) 90+2'
DF	14	(Israel) Denny Gropper
DF	16	(Norway) Aslak Fonn Witry
MF	82	(Bulgaria) Ivan Yordanov	(substituted on) 90+1'
FW	19	(Bulgaria) Georgi Rusev	(substituted on) 76'	(yellow card) 77'
FW	25	(Colombia) Emerson Rodríguez
FW	29	(Ivory Coast) Eric Bile	(substituted on) 85'
FW	37	(Ghana) Bernard Tekpetey
Manager:
(Croatia) Igor Jovićević

GK	21	(Belarus) Fyodor Lapoukhov
RB	15	(France) Thibaut Vion (c)
CB	4	(Spain) Adrián Lapeña	(yellow card) 18'
CB	5	(Kosovo) Lumbardh Dellova
LB	18	(Luxembourg) Mica Pinto	(substituted off) 75'
CM	99	(Cameroon) James Eto'o	(substituted off) 75'
CM	26	(Colombia) Marcelino Carreazo
RW	73	(Bulgaria) Ilian Iliev	(substituted off) 70'
AM	8	(Bulgaria) Stanislav Shopov	(substituted off) 63'
LW	7	(Norway) Olaus Skarsem	(substituted off) 71'
CF	28	(Cyprus) Ioannis Pittas
Substitutes:
GK	25	(Bulgaria) Ivan Dyulgerov
DF	3	(The Gambia) Sainey Sanyang	(substituted on) 75'
DF	6	(Scotland) Liam Cooper
DF	19	(Bulgaria) Ivan Turitsov
MF	9	(Kosovo) Zymer Bytyqi	(substituted on) 71'
MF	10	(Norway) Jonathan Lindseth	(substituted on) 63'
MF	16	(Bulgaria) Georgi Chorbadzhiyski	(substituted on) 75'
MF	30	(Bulgaria) Petko Panayotov
FW	11	(Guadeloupe) Matthias Phaëton	(substituted on) 70'
Manager:
(Bulgaria) Aleksandar Tomash

Man of the Match:

Assistant referees:
Martin Margaritov (Plovdiv)
Martin Venev (Sofia)
Fourth official:
Radoslav Gidzehnov (Plovdiv)
Video assistant referee:
Dragomir Draganov (Varna)
Assistant video assistant referee:
Nikola Popov (Sofia)

Match rules

- 90 minutes.
- 30 minutes of extra time if necessary.
- Penalty shoot-out if scores still level.
- Seven named substitutes.
- Maximum of five substitutions, with a sixth allowed in extra time. (Note: Each team will be given only three opportunities to make substitutions, with a fourth opportunity in extra time, excluding substitutions made at half-time, before the start of extra time and at half-time in extra time.)
