= 2024 Bulgarian Supercup =

Финал за Суперкупата на България 2024
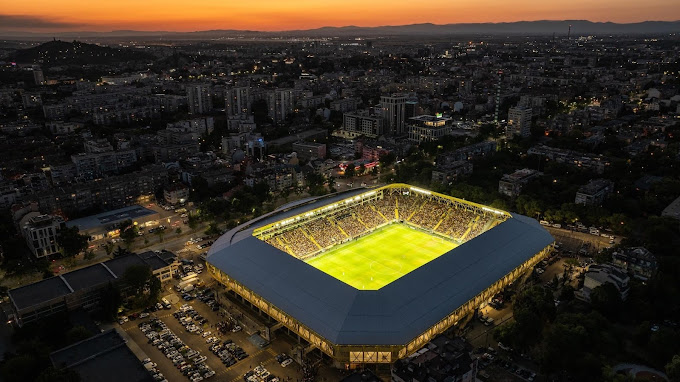
Ludogorets	Botev Plovdiv
First League	Bulgarian Cup
3	2
- Date: 4 February 2025
- Venue: Stadion Hristo Botev, Plovdiv
- Referee: Dragomir Draganov (Varna)
- Attendance: 6,777
- Weather: Mostly cloudy 4 °C (39 °F)

The 2024 Bulgarian Supercup was the 21st edition of the Bulgarian Supercup, an annual football match played between the winners of the previous season's First League and the Bulgarian Cup. The game has been played between the champions of the 2023–24 First League, Ludogorets Razgrad, and the 2023–24 Bulgarian Cup winner, Botev Plovdiv.

This was Ludogorets's 12th Supercup appearance and Botev's third. Both teams already competed against each other for the 2014 and 2017 Supercup finals with both teams exchanging one victory.

Initially supposed to be played in July 2024, the game has been rescheduled due to the participation of both teams in European competition. On 20 November 2024 the Bulgarian Professional Football League announced that the game has been scheduled for 4 February 2025.

Ludogorets won the match 3–2 for their 8th Supercup title.

== Match details ==
4 February 2025
18:00 UTC+2

Ludogorets Razgrad	3–2	Botev Plovdiv
Almeida 66'; Piotrowski 70'; Chochev 90+2'	Report	Akere 60'; Maraš 84'

Stadion Hristo Botev, Plovdiv
Attendance: 6,777
Referee: Dragomir Draganov (Varna)

Ludogorets	Botev

GK	1	(Netherlands) Sergio Padt
RB	14	(Israel) Denny Gropper	(substituted off) 76'
CB	15	(Sweden) Edvin Kurtulus
CB	4	(Portugal) Dinis Almeida
LB	24	(Benin) Olivier Verdon
CM	30	(Brazil) Pedro Naressi	(yellow card) 30'
CM	6	(Poland) Jakub Piotrowski (c)	(yellow card) 30'
RW	77	(Brazil) Erick Marcus
AM	20	(Guinea) Aguibou Camara	(substituted off) 62'
LW	11	(Brazil) Caio Vidal	(yellow card) 75'	(substituted off) 90+6'
CF	23	(Cape Verde) Deroy Duarte
Substitutes:
GK	39	(Germany) Hendrik Bonmann
DF	5	(Bulgaria) Georgi Terziev
MF	18	(Bulgaria) Ivaylo Chochev	(substituted on) 62'
MF	72	(Bulgaria) Rosen Ivanov
MF	80	(Bulgaria) Metodiy Stefanov
MF	82	(Bulgaria) Ivan Yordanov	(substituted on) 76'
FW	19	(Bulgaria) Georgi Rusev	(substituted on) 90+6'
FW	73	(Bulgaria) Filip Gigov
Manager:
(Croatia) Igor Jovićević

GK	1	(Denmark) Hans Christian Bernat
RB	17	(Bulgaria) Nikolay Minkov	(yellow card) 64'
CB	42	(Bulgaria) Ivaylo Videv
CB	15	(Bulgaria) Dimitar Avramov
LB	38	(Greece) Konstantinos Balogiannis	(yellow card) 31'
CM	88	(Slovenia) Alen Korošec	(yellow card) 90+1'	(substituted off) 90+4'
CM	28	(Bulgaria) Yanis Karabelyov	(yellow card) 34'
RW	4	(Nigeria) Ehije Ukaki	(substituted off) 73'
AM	10	(Bulgaria) Ivelin Popov (c)
LW	7	(Nigeria) Samuel Akere	(substituted off) 83'
CF	91	(Cameroon) Vinni Triboulet
Substitutes:
GK	32	(Estonia) Matvei Igonen
DF	6	(Bulgaria) Andrey Yordanov
DF	19	(Bulgaria) Gabriel Zlatanov
DF	27	(Ivory Coast) Siriky Diabaté
DF	44	(Bulgaria) Miroslav Georgiev
MF	16	(Lithuania) Matijus Remeikis
MF	21	(Bulgaria) Nikola Iliev	(substituted on) 90+4'
FW	30	(Ivory Coast) Christian Kassi	(substituted on) 73'
FW	99	(Montenegro) Aleksa Maraš	(substituted on) 83'
Manager:
(Bosnia and Herzegovina) Dušan Kerkez

Match officials

- Assistant referees:
  - Hristo Hadzhiyski (Varna)
  - Svetoslav Stoychev (Shumen)
- Fourth official:
  - Vasil Minev (Sofia)
- Video assistant referee:
  - Valentin Zhelezov (Burgas)
- Assistant video assistant referees:
  - Vasimir El-Hatib (Sofia)

Match rules

- 90 minutes.
- No overtime.
- Penalty shoot-out if scores still level.
- Seven named substitutes.
- Maximum of five substitutions. (Note: Each team was given only three opportunities to make substitutions excluding substitutions made at half-time.)
