= 2024 Bulgarian Cup final =

Финал на Sesame Купа на България 2024
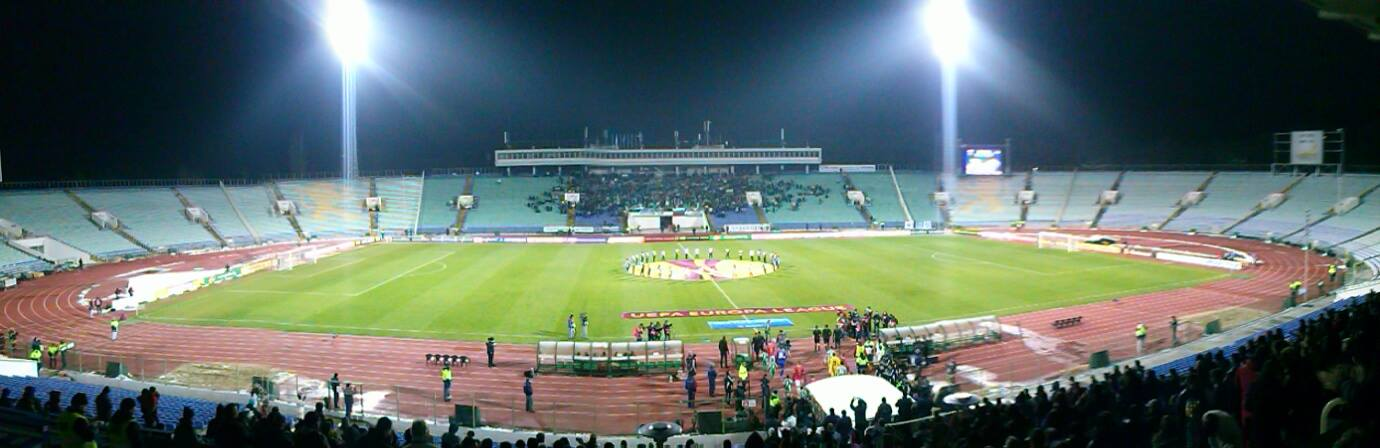
- Event: 2023–24 Bulgarian Cup
Ludogorets Razgrad	Botev Plovdiv
2	3
- Date: 15 May 2024
- Venue: Vasil Levski, Sofia
- Referee: Dragomir Draganov (Varna)
- Attendance: 11,334
- Weather: Light rain 9 °C (48 °F)

The 2024 Bulgarian Cup final was the final match of the 2023–24 Bulgarian Cup and the 84th final of the Bulgarian Cup. The final took place on 15 May 2024 at the Vasil Levski National Stadium in Sofia. On 2 May the date and venue has been confirmed.

The clubs contesting the final were Ludogorets Razgrad and Botev Plovdiv. This was the third time the final was contested between these two teams. Previously, Ludogorets won the first duel in 2014, while Botev won the second one in 2017. For Ludogorets, this was the second consecutive cup final after winning the trophy last year and a fifth final overall. Botev reached the final for 14th time overall, the last one being in 2019.

Botev won the match 3–2, claiming their fourth Bulgarian Cup and first since 2017. As cup winners, they will receive a place in the first qualifying round of 2024–25 UEFA Europa League.

== Route to the final ==
Ludogorets			Round	Botev
Opponent	Result	Legs		Opponent	Result	Legs
Balkan Botevgrad	4–0	away	First round	Strumska Slava	3–0	away
Lokomotiv Plovdiv	4–0	home	Second round	Etar	4–2	away
CSKA 1948	3–1	home	Quarter-finals	Spartak Varna	2–1	home
Hebar	9–0	4–0 home; 5–0 away	Semi-finals	CSKA Sofia	3–0	1–0 away; 2–0 home

== Match ==
=== Details ===
15 May 2024
19:00 UTC+3

Ludogorets Razgrad	2−3	Botev Plovdiv
Duah 8'; Rwan Cruz 71'	Report	Conte 4'; Sekulić 45'; Emmanuel 58'

Vasil Levski National Stadium, Sofia
Attendance: 11,334
Referee: Dragomir Draganov (Varna)

Ludogorets	Botev

GK	67	(Bulgaria) Damyan Hristov		(substituted off) 46'
RB	17	(Spain) Son
CB	26	(The Gambia) Noah Sonko Sundberg
CB	4	(Portugal) Dinis Almeida
LB	3	(Bulgaria) Anton Nedyalkov (c)		(substituted off) 81'
CM	30	(Brazil) Pedro Naressi	(yellow card) 77'	(substituted off) 82'
CM	8	(Portugal) Claude Gonçalves		(substituted off) 62'
RW	77	(Brazil) Caio Vidal	(yellow card) 36'	(substituted off) 66'
AM	6	(Poland) Jakub Piotrowski	(yellow card) 10'
LW	7	(Brazil) Rick
CF	9	(Switzerland) Kwadwo Duah
Substitutes:
GK	69	(Bulgaria) Plamen Pepelyashev	(substituted on) 46'
DF	5	(Bulgaria) Georgi Terziev
DF	14	(Israel) Denny Gropper	(substituted on) 81'
DF	24	(Benin) Olivier Verdon
MF	18	(Bulgaria) Ivaylo Chochev
MF	88	(Bulgaria) Todor Nedelev	(substituted on) 82'
FW	10	(Argentina) Matías Tissera
FW	90	(Bulgaria) Spas Delev	(substituted on) 66'
FW	99	(Brazil) Rwan Cruz	(substituted on) 62'	(penalty missed) 90+11'
Manager:
(Bulgaria) Georgi Dermendzhiev

GK	1	(Bosnia and Herzegovina) Hidajet Hankić
RB	17	(Bulgaria) Nikolay Minkov	(yellow card) 40'
CB	5	(Estonia) Joonas Tamm
CB	19	(Guinea) Antoine Conte	(yellow card) 90+10'
LB	38	(Greece) Konstantinos Balogiannis
CM	15	(Cameroon) James Eto'o	(yellow card) 77'
CM	20	(Spain) Antonio Perera
RW	31	(Nigeria) Umeh Emmanuel
AM	10	(Bulgaria) Ivelin Popov (c)		(substituted off) 84'
LW	7	(France) Mohamed Brahimi	(yellow card) 77'	(substituted off) 90+2'
CF	9	(Croatia) Martin Sekulić		(substituted off) 76'
Substitutes:
GK	32	(Estonia) Matvei Igonen
DF	4	(Nigeria) Ehije Ukaki	(substituted on) 76'
DF	18	(Bulgaria) Dimitar Papazov
DF	42	(Bulgaria) Ivaylo Videv
DF	79	(Bulgaria) Atanas Chernev	(substituted on) 84'
MF	28	(Bulgaria) Yanis Karabelyov	(substituted on) 90+2'
MF	30	(Bulgaria) Lachezar Baltanov
FW	16	(Nigeria) Samuel Akere
FW	40	(Nigeria) Christian Nwachukwu
Manager:
(Bosnia and Herzegovina) Dušan Kerkez				(yellow card) 88'

Man of the Match:

Assistant referees:
Hristo Hadzhiyski (Varna)
Dimo Valchev (Varna)
Fourth official:
Georgi Ginchev (Veliko Tarnovo)
Video assistant referee:
Ivaylo Stoyanov (Petrich)
Assistant video assistant referees:
Nikola Popov (Sofia)
Diyan Valkov (Varna)

Match rules

- 90 minutes.
- 30 minutes of extra time if necessary.
- Penalty shoot-out if scores still level.
- Nine named substitutes.
- Maximum of five substitutions, with a sixth allowed in extra time. (Note: Each team will be given only three opportunities to make substitutions, with a fourth opportunity in extra time, excluding substitutions made at half-time, before the start of extra time and at half-time in extra time.)
