= Verdon =

Verdon may refer to:

== People ==
- Verdon (surname)

== Places ==
=== France ===
- Verdon, Dordogne, in the Dordogne département
- Verdon, Marne, in the Marne département
- Vinon-sur-Verdon, an old French town in the département of Var, Provence-Alpes-Côte d'Azur region
- Le Verdon-sur-Mer, in the Gironde département
- Verdun, a small north-eastern French city famous for various 18th-20th century military campaigns

=== United States ===
- Verdon Township, Aitkin County, Minnesota
- Verdon, Nebraska
- Verdon, South Dakota

== Other ==
- Verdon college, a co-educational Roman Catholic high school in Invercargill, New Zealand
- Verdon (river), a river in south-eastern France, left tributary of the Durance
  - Verdon Gorge (French: Gorges du Verdon or Grand canyon du Verdon), a river canyon in south-eastern France
- The Hispano-Suiza Verdon, a license-built version of the Rolls-Royce RB.44 Tay

== See also ==
- Verden (disambiguation)
- Verdun (disambiguation)
