= Ferdon =

Ferdon is a surname created from Verdon. Notable people with the surname include:

- Edwin Ferdon (1913–2002), American ethnologist
- John W. Ferdon (1826–1884), American politician

== See also ==
- William Ferdon House
- Mudge Rose Guthrie Alexander & Ferdon
