= Verden =

Verden can refer to:

- Verden, Aller, a town in Lower Saxony, Germany
- Verden, Oklahoma, a small town in the USA
- Verden (district), a district in Lower Saxony, Germany
- Diocese of Verden (768–1648), a former diocese of the Catholic Church
- Prince-Bishopric of Verden (1180–1648), a former prince-bishopric in the Holy Roman Empire
- Principality of Verden (1648–1823), a former principality in the Holy Roman Empire
- Verden Allen (born 1944), British musician, former member of Mott the Hoople
- Verden, a colony of the micronational Aerican Empire

== See also ==
- Verdon (disambiguation)
- Verdun (disambiguation)
