= Yelisey Syrov =

Bulgarian footballer

Personal information
- Full name: Yelisey Sergeyevich Syrov
- Date of birth: 17 January 2008 (age 18)
- Place of birth: Saint Petersburg, Russia
- Height: 1.80 m (5 ft 11 in)
- Position: Midfielder

Team information
- Current team: Ludogorets Razgrad
- Number: 75

Youth career
- 2013–2022: Zenit Saint Petersburg
- 2022–2024: Ludogorets Razgrad

Senior career*
Years	Team	Apps	(Gls)
2024	Ludogorets III	7	(4)
2024–	Ludogorets II	60	(9)
2024–	Ludogorets Razgrad	0	(0)
- * Club domestic league appearances and goals as of 16:33, 18 November 2026 (UTC)

Yelisey Sergeyevich Syrov (Russian: Елисей Сергеевич Сыров; born 16 January 2008) is a Russian-born Bulgarian professional footballer who plays as a midfielder for Ludogorets Razgrad.

== Career ==
Born in Saint Petersburg, Russia, Syrov began his career at Zenit Saint Petersburg Academy. In the summer of 2022 he moved with his family to Bulgaria and joined Ludogorets Razgrad Academy. He quickly established himself in the academy teams becoming champion with both U16 and U17 teams and won the award for best U17 player in Bulgaria. On 26 May 2024 he was unused substitute in the league match against Levski Sofia. On 28 July 2024 he signed his first professional contract with Ludogorets at the age of 16 and was called one of biggest talents in Ludogorets Academy. In June 2024 he joined the summer camp with the first team. In January 2025 he was once again called for the first team winter camp.

== International career ==
In an interview in January 2025, Ludogorets II manager, Zahari Sirakov, spoke about the desire of Syrov to gain Bulgarian citizenship and represent Bulgaria. He received his Bulgarian passport in March 2026.

== Career statistics ==
=== Club ===
As of 24 March 2026

Club performance			League		Cup		Continental		Other		Total	
Club	League	Season	Apps	Goals	Apps	Goals	Apps	Goals	Apps	Goals	Apps	Goals
Bulgaria			League		Bulgarian Cup		Europe		Other		Total	
Ludogorets III	Third League	2024–25	7	4	–		–		–		7	4
Ludogorets II	Second League	2024–25	20	1	–		–		–		20	1
Ludogorets II	Second League	2025–26	25	4	–		–		–		25	4
Ludogorets II	Total		45	5	0	0	0	0	0	0	45	5
Ludogorets Razgrad	First League	2023–24	0	0	0	0	0	0	0	0	0	0
Ludogorets Razgrad	First League	2024–25	0	0	0	0	0	0	0	0	0	0
Ludogorets Razgrad	First League	2025–26	0	0	0	0	0	0	0	0	0	0
Ludogorets Razgrad	Total		0	0	0	0	0	0	0	0	0	0
Career statistics			27	5	0	0	0	0	0	0	27	5
