= Verdun (disambiguation) =

Verdun is a city in the Meuse département of France.

It also refers to the Battle of Verdun, fought near the above.

Verdun may also refer to:

== People ==
- J Robert Verdun, a Canadian shareholder-rights activist
- Verdun Howell, a former Australian Rules footballer

== Places ==
=== Australia ===
- Verdun, South Australia

=== Canada ===
- Verdun, Quebec, a borough of the City of Montreal and former municipality in Quebec
  - Verdun (provincial electoral district), within the borough of Verdun
  - Verdun (federal electoral district), riding from 1933 to 2004
  - Verdun (Montreal Metro), a Montreal Metro station

=== France ===
- Verdun, Ariège, in the Ariège département

Also part of the name of:

- Château-Verdun, in the Ariège département
- Verdun-en-Lauragais, in the Aude département
- Verdun-sur-Garonne, in the Tarn-et-Garonne département
- Verdun-sur-le-Doubs, in the Saône-et-Loire département

=== Lebanon ===
- Verdun, Beirut, shopping district in the capital of Lebanon

=== Mauritius ===
- Verdun, Mauritius, a village in the district of Moka, Mauritius

=== Slovenia ===
- Verdun, Novo Mesto, a settlement in the City Municipality of Novo Mesto
- Verdun pri Uršnih Selih, a settlement in the Municipality of Dolenjske Toplice

=== Uruguay ===
- Verdun Hill, a Catholic peregrination center in Lavalleja Department

== Ships ==
- HMS Verdun (L93), an Admiralty V destroyer of the Royal Navy
- French aircraft carrier Verdun, a projected aircraft carrier of the French navy, ordered in 1958 and later cancelled

== Other ==
- Battle of Verdun, A major battle of World War I, often referred to simply as Verdun.
- Verdun (video game)
- Treaty of Verdun, which divided the Carolingian Empire

== See also ==
- Verden (disambiguation)
- Verdon (disambiguation)
