= Verdon (surname) =

Verdon is a French or English of Norman origin surname, under Dutch influence as Ferdon. Notable people with the surname include:

- Doug Verdon (1920–2000), English-born Australian horticulturalist and lichenologist
- George Frederic Verdon (1834–96), English-Australian politician and public figure
- Gwen Verdon (1925–2000), Tony Award-winning American dancer and actress
- John Verdon (born 1942), American novelist known for detective stories
- Jimmy Verdon (born 1981), defensive end in American Football
- Malik Verdon (born 2002), American football player
- Olivier Verdon (born 1995), footballer
- Philip Verdon (1886–1960), British rower who competed in the 1908 Summer Olympics
- René Verdon (1924–2011), French-born American chef
- Timothy Verdon (born 1946), Roman Catholic priest and Art Historian
- Guillaume Verdon, Canadian physicist and entrepreneur
