= Caio Vidal =

Brazilian footballer (born 2000)

Personal information
- Full name: Caio Vidal Rocha
- Date of birth: 4 November 2000 (age 26)
- Place of birth: Fortaleza, Brazil
- Height: 1.74 m (5 ft 9 in)
- Position: Winger

Team information
- Current team: Ludogorets Razgrad
- Number: 11

Youth career
- 2018: Grêmio Pague Menos
- 2018–2019: Porto-PE
- 2019–2020: Bahia

Senior career*
Years	Team	Apps	(Gls)
2020–2022	Internacional	73	(6)
2022	→ Bahia (loan)	11	(0)
2023–	Ludogorets Razgrad	91	(13)
- * Club domestic league appearances and goals as of 10:10, 9 September 2026 (UTC)

Caio Vidal Rocha (born 4 November 2000), known as Caio Vidal, is a Brazilian professional footballer who plays as a winger for Bulgarian First League club Ludogorets Razgrad.

== Career ==
On 12 December 2020, Caio Vidal signed his first professional contract with Internacional. Caio made his professional debut with Internacional in a 1–0 Copa do Brasil win over América Mineiro on 19 November 2020. In February 2023, he joined Bulgarian team Ludogorets Razgrad. On 24 May 2023, Caio scored two goals in the final of the Bulgarian Cup against CSKA 1948. On 22 May 2025, he netted the only goal in the 1:0 win over CSKA Sofia, making a decisive contribution towards his team lifting its fourth Bulgarian Cup.

== Career statistics ==
As of match played 9 September 2026

Appearances and goals by club, season and competition
Club	Season	League			State league		National cup (Note: Includes Copa do Brasil, Bulgarian Cup)		Continental		Other		Total	
Club	Season	Division	Apps	Goals	Apps	Goals	Apps	Goals	Apps	Goals	Apps	Goals	Apps	Goals
Internacional	2020	Série A	14	2	0	0	1	0	0	0	0	0	15	2
Internacional	2021	Série A	20	1	10	0	2	0	5 (Note: Appearances in Copa Libertadores)	1	0	0	37	2
Internacional	2022	Série A	7	0	10	2	1	0	3 (Note: Appearances in Copa Sudamericana)	0	0	0	22	2
Internacional	Total		41	3	20	2	4	0	8	1	0	0	74	6
Bahia (loan)	2022	Série B	8	0	0	0	—		—		—		8	0
Bahia (loan)	2023	Série A	0	0	3	0	—		—		—		3	0
Bahia (loan)	Total		8	0	3	0	—		—		—		11	0
Ludogorets Razgrad	2022–23	First League	11	2	—		4	3	—		—		15	5
Ludogorets Razgrad	2023–24	First League	28	5	—		5	2	15 (Note: Four appearances and one goal in UEFA Champions League, four appearances in UEFA Europa League, seven appearances in UEFA Europa Conference League)	1	1 (Note: Appearances in Bulgarian Supercup)	0	49	8
Ludogorets Razgrad	2024–25	First League	31	4	—		3	3	12 (Note: Appearances in UEFA Champions League)	1	1 (Note: Appearances in Bulgarian Supercup)	0	47	8
Ludogorets Razgrad	2025–26	First League	18	2	—		1	1	17	0	1 (Note: Appearances in Bulgarian Supercup)	0	37	3
Ludogorets Razgrad	2026–27	First League	3	0	—		0	0	0	0	0 (Note: Appearances in Bulgarian Supercup)	0	3	0
Ludogorets Razgrad	Total		91	13	—		13	9	44	2	3	0	151	24
Career total			141	16	23	2	17	9	52	3	3	0	236	27

== Honours ==
Internacional

- Copa São Paulo de Futebol Júnior: 2020

Ludogorets Razgrad

- Bulgarian First League: (3) 2022–23, 2023–24, 2024–25
- Bulgarian Cup: (2) 2022–23, 2024–25
- Bulgarian Supercup: (3) 2023, 2024, 2025
