= Kaloyan Kostov =

Bulgarian footballer (born 2005)

Personal information
- Full name: Kaloyan Kalinov Kostov
- Date of birth: 4 May 2004 (age 22)
- Place of birth: Sofia, Bulgaria
- Height: 1.95 m (6 ft 5 in)
- Position: Centre-back

Team information
- Current team: Lokomotiv Sofia
- Number: 3

Youth career
- –2020: Septemvri Sofia
- 2020–2023: Benfica

Senior career*
Years	Team	Apps	(Gls)
2023–2026	Lokomotiv Plovdiv	24	(1)
2026–	Lokomotiv Sofia	0	(0)

International career^{‡}
2019–2020	Bulgaria U17	6	(0)
2023–2024	Bulgaria U21	6	(0)
- * Club domestic league appearances and goals as of 11 June 2026 ‡ National team caps and goals as of 21:14, 6 June 2025 (UTC)

Kaloyan Kostov (Bulgarian: Калоян Костов; born 4 May 2004) is a Bulgarian professional footballer who plays as a centre-back for First League club Lokomotiv Sofia.

== Career ==
Born in Sofia, Kostov started his career in the local Septemvri Sofia. On 7 September 2020 he completed a move to the Benfica academy. In June 2023 it was announced that Kostov won't renew his contract with Benfica and will leave the team. Few days later he returned in Bulgaria and signed a 3-year contract with Lokomotiv Plovdiv. He scored his debut goal on 7 September 2023 in a league match against Hebar Pazardzhik, but minutes later was injured and set to miss around 6 months.

== International career ==
Andreev was called up for Bulgaria U21 for the 2025 UEFA European Under-21 Championship qualification against Estonia U21 and Israel U21.

== Career statistics ==
=== Club ===
As of 2 October 2023

Club performance			League		Cup		Continental		Other		Total	
Club	League	Season	Apps	Goals	Apps	Goals	Apps	Goals	Apps	Goals	Apps	Goals
Lokomotiv Plovdiv	First League	2023–24	6	1	0	0	–		–		6	1
Lokomotiv Plovdiv	Total		6	1	0	0	0	0	0	0	6	1
Career statistics			6	1	0	0	0	0	0	0	6	1
