= Deroy Duarte =

Cape Verdean footballer (born 1999)

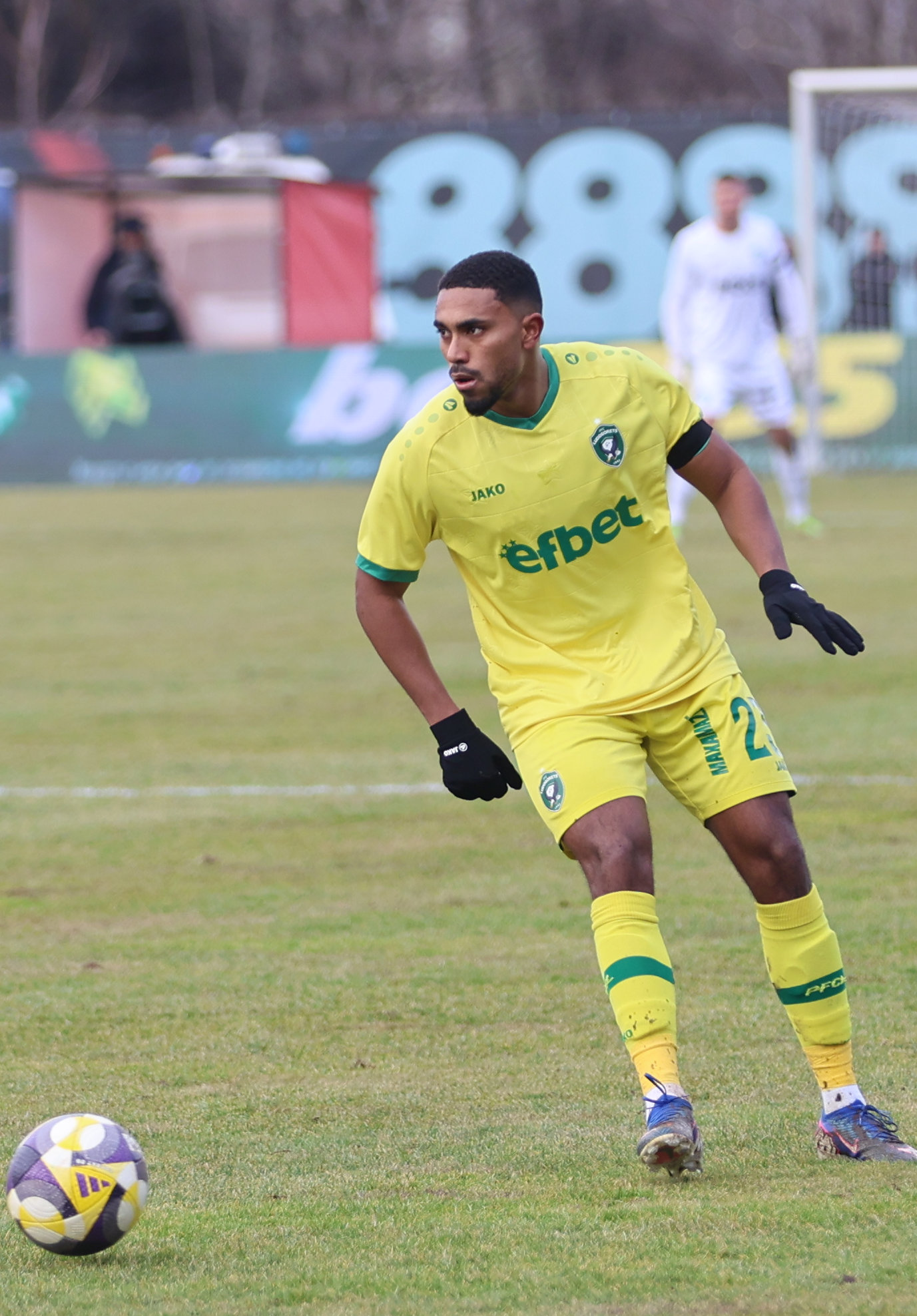
- Duarte with Ludogorets Razgrad in 2026

Personal information
- Full name: Deroy D'Encarnação Duarte
- Date of birth: 4 July 1999 (age 27)
- Place of birth: Rotterdam, Netherlands
- Height: 1.77 m (5 ft 10 in)
- Position: Midfielder

Team information
- Current team: Ludogorets Razgrad
- Number: 23

Youth career
- 2006–2016: Sparta Rotterdam

Senior career*
Years	Team	Apps	(Gls)
2016–2021	Jong Sparta	32	(12)
2017–2021	Sparta Rotterdam	102	(12)
2021–2024	Fortuna Sittard	87	(4)
2024–	Ludogorets Razgrad	70	(3)

International career^{‡}
2016	Netherlands U18	4	(0)
2017–2018	Netherlands U19	9	(0)
2018–2019	Netherlands U21	2	(0)
2022–	Cape Verde	38	(1)
Medal record
Men's football
Representing Cape Verde
FIFA Series
Winner	2024 Saudi Arabia A
- * Club domestic league appearances and goals as of 10:29, 15 September 2026 (UTC) ‡ National team caps and goals as of 25 September 2026

Deroy d'Encarnação Duarte (Dutch: [də.ˈɾɔj] Portuguese: [dẽ.kɐɾ.nɐ.ˈsɐ̃w du.ˈaɾ.tɨ]; born 4 July 1999) is a professional football player who plays as a midfielder for Bulgarian First League club Ludogorets Razgrad. Born in the Netherlands, he represents the Cape Verde national team.

== Club career ==
=== Sparta Rotterdam ===
Duarte played youth football for Sparta Rotterdam. As the Tweede Divisie was reintroduced, he began playing regularly for Jong Sparta Rotterdam who had joined the Dutch football league system. In the 2016–17 season, he was on Sparta's first-team bench for a few games without making an appearance.

He made his professional debut for Sparta in the 2017–18 season, replacing Stijn Spierings in the 81st minute of a 3–0 away loss to VVV-Venlo. Sparta was relegated to the Eerste Divisie that season. However, he was part of the team that finished second and returned to the Eredivisie after winning the promotion play-off against TOP Oss and De Graafschap.

In the following 2019–20 season, he was mainly a substitute, with his brother Laros Duarte among the players ahead of him in the pecking order. However, he established himself as a regular starter in his fifth and final season at Sparta, during the 2020–21 season. His contract with Sparta expired in June 2021, with Duarte having scored a total of 13 goals in 115 appearances for the club.

=== Fortuna Sittard ===
On 12 August 2021, Duarte signed a three-year contract with Fortuna Sittard, who acquired him on a free transfer from Sparta. Two days later, he made his debut in the season opener against Twente, which was won 2–1. On 26 February 2022, he scored his first goal for the club against Cambuur.

=== Ludogorets Razgrad ===
In June 2024, he moved to Bulgaria, joining Ludogorets Razgrad.

== International career ==
Born in the Netherlands, Duarte is of Cape Verdean descent. He has represented the Netherlands 9 times at Under-19 level, but later was called up to represent the Cape Verde national team for a set of friendlies in March 2022. He debuted with Cape Verde in a 2–0 friendly win over Guadeloupe.

On 18 May 2026, he was called up by Cape Verde's head coach Bubista for the 2026 FIFA World Cup.

On 3 July 2026, Duarte scored in the 59th minute of the Round of 32 match against Argentina, the reigning champions of the 2022 FIFA World Cup, equalizing the match at 1–1; it was his first international goal for Cape Verde, although, despite getting another goal afterward from Sidny Lopes Cabral, Cape Verde would lose to Argentina, 3–2, in extra time.

== Personal life ==
He is the younger brother of the footballer Laros Duarte.

== Career statistics ==
=== Club ===
As of match played 15 September 2026

Appearances and goals by club, season and competition
Club	Season	League			National cup (Note: Includes KNVB Beker, Bulgarian Cup)		Europe		Other		Total	
Club	Season	Division	Apps	Goals	Apps	Goals	Apps	Goals	Apps	Goals	Apps	Goals
Jong Sparta	2016–17	Tweede Divisie	29	12	—		—		—		29	12
Jong Sparta	2017–18	Tweede Divisie	2	0	—		—		—		2	0
Jong Sparta	2020–21	Tweede Divisie	1	0	—		—		—		1	0
Jong Sparta	Total		32	12	—		—		—		32	12
Sparta Rotterdam	2017–18	Eredivisie	25	3	1	0	—		4 (Note: Appearances in Eredivisie promotion/relegation playoffs)	1	30	4
Sparta Rotterdam	2018–19	Eerste Divisie	34	5	0	0	—		4	0	38	5
Sparta Rotterdam	2019–20	Eredivisie	14	0	2	0	—		—		16	0
Sparta Rotterdam	2020–21	Eredivisie	29	4	1	0	—		1 (Note: Appearances in Eredivisie European play-offs)	0	31	4
Sparta Rotterdam	Total		102	12	4	0	—		9	1	115	13
Fortuna Sittard	2021–22	Eredivisie	33	1	1	0	—		—		34	1
Fortuna Sittard	2022–23	Eredivisie	26	1	0	0	—		—		26	1
Fortuna Sittard	2023–24	Eredivisie	28	2	3	0	—		—		31	2
Fortuna Sittard	Total		87	4	4	0	—		—		92	4
Ludogorets Razgrad	2024–25	Bulgarian First League	29	1	4	0	13 (Note: Four appearances in UEFA Champions League, nine appearances in UEFA Europa League)	0	1	0	47	1
Ludogorets Razgrad	2025–26	Bulgarian First League	34	2	5	0	16 (Note: Five appearances in UEFA Champions League, eleven appearances and one goal in UEFA Europa League)	1	1	0	57	3
Ludogorets Razgrad	2026–27	Bulgarian First League	7	0	0	0	0	0	0	0	7	0
Ludogorets Razgrad	Total		70	3	9	0	29	1	3	0	112	4
Career total			285	30	17	0	29	1	12	1	343	30

=== International ===
As of match played 25 September 2026

Appearances and goals by national team and year
National team	Year	Apps	Goals
Cape Verde	2022	4	0
Cape Verde	2023	7	0
Cape Verde	2024	11	0
Cape Verde	2025	6	0
Cape Verde	2026	10	1
Total		38	1

Scores and results list Cape Verde's goal tally first, score column indicates score after each Duarte goal.

List of international goals scored by Deroy Duarte
No.	Date	Venue	Cap	Opponent	Score	Result	Competition
1	3 July 2026	Hard Rock Stadium, Miami Gardens, United States	37	Argentina	1–1	2–3 (a.e.t.)	2026 FIFA World Cup

== Honours ==
Ludogorets Razgrad

- Bulgarian First League: 2024–25
- Bulgarian Cup: 2024–25
- Bulgarian Supercup: (2) 2024, 2025

Cape Verde

- FIFA Series: 2024
