= Erick Marcus =

Brazilian footballer (born 2004)

- Erick Marcus dos Santos Oliveira do Carmo

Personal information
- Full name: Erick Marcus dos Santos Oliveira do Carmo
- Date of birth: 1 March 2004 (age 22)
- Place of birth: Rio de Janeiro, Brazil
- Height: 1.72 m (5 ft 8 in)
- Position: Winger

Team information
- Current team: Ludogorets Razgrad
- Number: 77

Youth career
- 2016–2023: Vasco da Gama

Senior career*
| Years | Team | Apps | (Gls) |
| 2023–2025 | Vasco da Gama | 31 | (1) |
| 2024 | → Ludogorets Razgrad (loan) | 12 | (5) |
| 2025– | Ludogorets Razgrad | 49 | (7) |

International career
| 2022 | Brazil U20 | 2 | (0) |
- * Club domestic league appearances and goals as of 10:40, 9 September 2026 (UTC)

Erick Marcus dos Santos Oliveira do Carmo (born 1 March 2004) is a Brazilian professional footballer who plays as a winger for Bulgarian First League club Ludogorets Razgrad.

== Club career ==
Born in Jacarepaguá, Erick Marcus joined the academy of Vasco da Gama in 2016. He signed his first professional contract with the club in January 2023. The following month, having already made his debut in the Campeonato Carioca, he scored his first goal for Vasco da Gama, in a 4–0 Copa do Brasil win over Trem.

On February 8, 2025, Erick signed a permanent contract with Ludogorets Razgrad.

== International career ==
Erick Marcus has represented Brazil at under-20 level.

== Career statistics ==
=== Club ===
As of 9 September 2026

Appearances and goals by club, season and competition
| Club | Season | League | | | State League | | Cup | | Continental | | Other | | Total | |
| Club | Season | Division | Apps | Goals | Apps | Goals | Apps | Goals | Apps | Goals | Apps | Goals | Apps | Goals |
|---|---|---|---|---|---|---|---|---|---|---|---|---|---|---|
| Vasco da Gama | 2023 | Série A | 20 | 1 | 11 (Note: Appearances in the Campeonato Carioca) | 0 | 2 (Note: Appearances in the Copa do Brasil) | 1 | — | | 0 | 0 | 33 | 2 |
| Ludogorets Razgrad (loan) | 2024–25 | Bulgarian First League | 12 | 5 | — | | 1 | 0 | 7 | 1 | 1 | 0 | 21 | 6 |
| Ludogorets Razgrad | 2024–25 | Bulgarian First League | 15 | 3 | — | | 3 | 0 | 0 | 0 | 0 | 0 | 18 | 3 |
| Ludogorets Razgrad | 2024–25 | Bulgarian First League | 22 | 3 | — | | 2 | 1 | 17 | 1 | 1 | 0 | 42 | 5 |
| Ludogorets Razgrad | Ludogorets total | | 49 | 11 | 0 | 0 | 6 | 1 | 24 | 2 | 2 | 0 | 82 | 14 |
| Career total | | | 69 | 12 | 11 | 0 | 8 | 2 | 24 | 2 | 2 | 0 | 114 | 16 |
