= Kwadwo Duah =

Swiss footballer (born 1997)

Personal information
- Full name: Kwadwo Antwi Duah
- Date of birth: 24 February 1997 (age 29)
- Place of birth: London, England
- Height: 1.85 m (6 ft 1 in)
- Position: Forward

Team information
- Current team: Ludogorets Razgrad
- Number: 9

Youth career
- –2016: Young Boys

Senior career*
Years	Team	Apps	(Gls)
2016–2019	Young Boys	6	(1)
2017	→ Neuchâtel Xamax (loan)	11	(1)
2017–2018	→ Winterthur (loan)	25	(5)
2018–2019	→ Servette (loan)	11	(2)
2019–2020	Wil	33	(12)
2020–2022	St. Gallen	65	(24)
2022–2023	1. FC Nürnberg	33	(11)
2023–	Ludogorets Razgrad	75	(28)

International career^{‡}
2014–2015	Switzerland U18	4	(0)
2015–2016	Switzerland U19	4	(3)
2016	Switzerland U20	2	(0)
2024–	Switzerland	6	(1)
- * Club domestic league appearances and goals as of 10:07, 9 September 2026 (UTC) ‡ National team caps and goals as of 8 September 2024

Kwadwo Antwi Duah (born 24 February 1997) is a professional footballer who plays as a forward for Bulgarian First League club Ludogorets Razgrad. Born in England, he plays for the Switzerland national team.

== Club career ==
Duah is a youth product from BSC Young Boys. He made his Swiss Super League debut on 30 July 2016 against FC Lugano, replacing Yoric Ravet after 78 minutes.

On 24 June 2022, Duah signed with 2. Bundesliga club 1. FC Nürnberg. On 19 July 2023, Duah signed with Bulgarian First League club Ludogorets.

== International career ==
Duah made his debut for the Switzerland national team on 4 June 2024 in a friendly against Estonia. On 7 June, he was selected in the 26-man squad for the UEFA Euro 2024. On 15 June, he scored his first international goal in a 3–1 victory over Hungary in Switzerland's opening match of the tournament.

== Personal life ==
Duah was born in London, England, and moved to Switzerland at a young age. He is of Ghanaian descent, and holds dual citizenship with Ghana and Switzerland. He is also fan of London football club Chelsea F.C.

== Career statistics ==
=== Club ===
As of match played 9 September 2026

Appearances and goals by club, season and competition
Club	Season	League			National cup (Note: Includes Swiss Cup, DFB-Pokal, Bulgarian Cup)		Continental		Other		Total	
Club	Season	Division	Apps	Goals	Apps	Goals	Apps	Goals	Apps	Goals	Apps	Goals
Young Boys	2016–17	Swiss Super League	6	1	1	1	6 (Note: One appearance in UEFA Champions League, five appearances in UEFA Europa League)	0	—		13	2
Neuchâtel Xamax (loan)	2016–17	Swiss Challenge League	11	1	0	0	—		—		11	1
Winterthur (loan)	2017–18	Swiss Challenge League	25	5	1	1	—		—		26	6
Servette (loan)	2018–19	Swiss Challenge League	11	2	0	0	—		—		11	2
Wil	2019–20	Swiss Challenge League	33	12	1	0	—		—		34	12
St. Gallen	2020–21	Swiss Super League	32	9	4	1	1 (Note: Appearance in UEFA Europa League)	0	—		37	10
St. Gallen	2021–22	Swiss Super League	33	15	5	3	—		—		38	18
St. Gallen	Total		65	24	9	4	1	0	—		75	28
1. FC Nürnberg	2022–23	2. Bundesliga	33	11	4	0	—		—		37	11
Ludogorets Razgrad	2023–24	Bulgarian First League	24	13	5	1	7 (Note: One appearance in UEFA Champions League, six appearances and one goal in UEFA Europa Conference League)	1	1 (Note: Appearance in Bulgarian Supercup)	0	37	15
Ludogorets Razgrad	2024–25	Bulgarian First League	25	6	4	1	11 (Note: Three appearance and two goals in UEFA Champions League, eight appearances and two goals in UEFA Europa League)	4	0 (Note: Appearance in Bulgarian Supercup)	0	40	11
Ludogorets Razgrad	2025–26	Bulgarian First League	19	8	4	3	2	1	1 (Note: Appearance in Bulgarian Supercup)	0	26	12
Ludogorets Razgrad	2026–27	Bulgarian First League	7	1	0	0	2	0	0 (Note: Appearance in Bulgarian Supercup)	0	9	1
Ludogorets Razgrad	Total		75	28	13	5	22	6	2	0	112	39
Career total			259	84	28	11	29	6	2	0	318	101

=== International ===
As of match played 8 September 2024

Appearances and goals by national team and year
National team	Year	Apps	Goals
Switzerland
Switzerland	2024	6	1
Total		6	1

As of match played 15 June 2024
Scores and results list Switzerland's goal tally first.

List of international goals scored by Kwadwo Duah
No.	Date	Venue	Cap	Opponent	Score	Result	Competition	Ref.
1	15 June 2024	RheinEnergieStadion, Cologne, Germany	2	Hungary	1–0	3–1	UEFA Euro 2024	
