= Aleksa Maraš =

Montenegrin footballer (born 2001)

Personal information
- Date of birth: 9 October 2001 (age 25)
- Place of birth: Montenegro
- Height: 1.92 m (6 ft 4 in)
- Position: Striker

Team information
- Current team: FC Košice
- Number: 99

Senior career*
Years	Team	Apps	(Gls)
2019–2021	Drezga	21	(5)
2021	Igalo	17	(11)
2021–2023	Dečić	3	(1)
2022	→ Zeta (loan)	16	(5)
2022	→ Mornar Bar (loan)	9	(1)
2023	Igalo	4	(2)
2023–2024	Mladost Donja Gorica	34	(14)
2024–	Botev Plovdiv	40	(5)
2024	Botev Plovdiv II	1	(0)
2025	→ Panserraikos (loan)	12	(3)
2026-	FC Košice	8	(6)

International career^{‡}
2026–	Montenegro	1	(1)
- * Club domestic league appearances and goals as of 21 September 2026 ‡ National team caps and goals as of 13 November 2026

Aleksa Maraš (born 9 October 2001) is a Montenegrin professional footballer who plays as a striker for Slovak club FC Košice and the Montenegro national team..

== Early life ==
He was born in 2001 in Montenegro. He is the son of Montenegrin footballer Drago Maraš.

== Career ==
=== Club ===
In 2023, he signed for Montenegrin side Mladost Donja Gorica. He was regarded as one of the club's most important players.

In June 2024, he moved to Bulgarian First League side Botev Plovdiv. On 8 August 2024, he scored his first goal for the club in a 2–1 home win against Zrinjski Mostar in the UEFA Conference League third qualifying round.

=== International ===
As of match played 12 November 2026

Appearances and goals by national team and year
National team	Year	Apps	Goals
Montenegro	2026	1	1
Total		1	1

Scores and results list Montenegro's goal tally first, score column indicates score after each Maraš goal.

List of international goals scored by Aleksa Maraš
No.	Date	Venue	Opponent	Score	Result	Competition
1	12 November 2026	Podgorica City Stadium, Podgorica, Montenegro	Latvia	2–1	2–1	2026–27 UEFA Nations League C

== Style of play ==
He mainly operates as a striker. He is known for his strength.
