= Igor Jovićević =

Croatian football manager

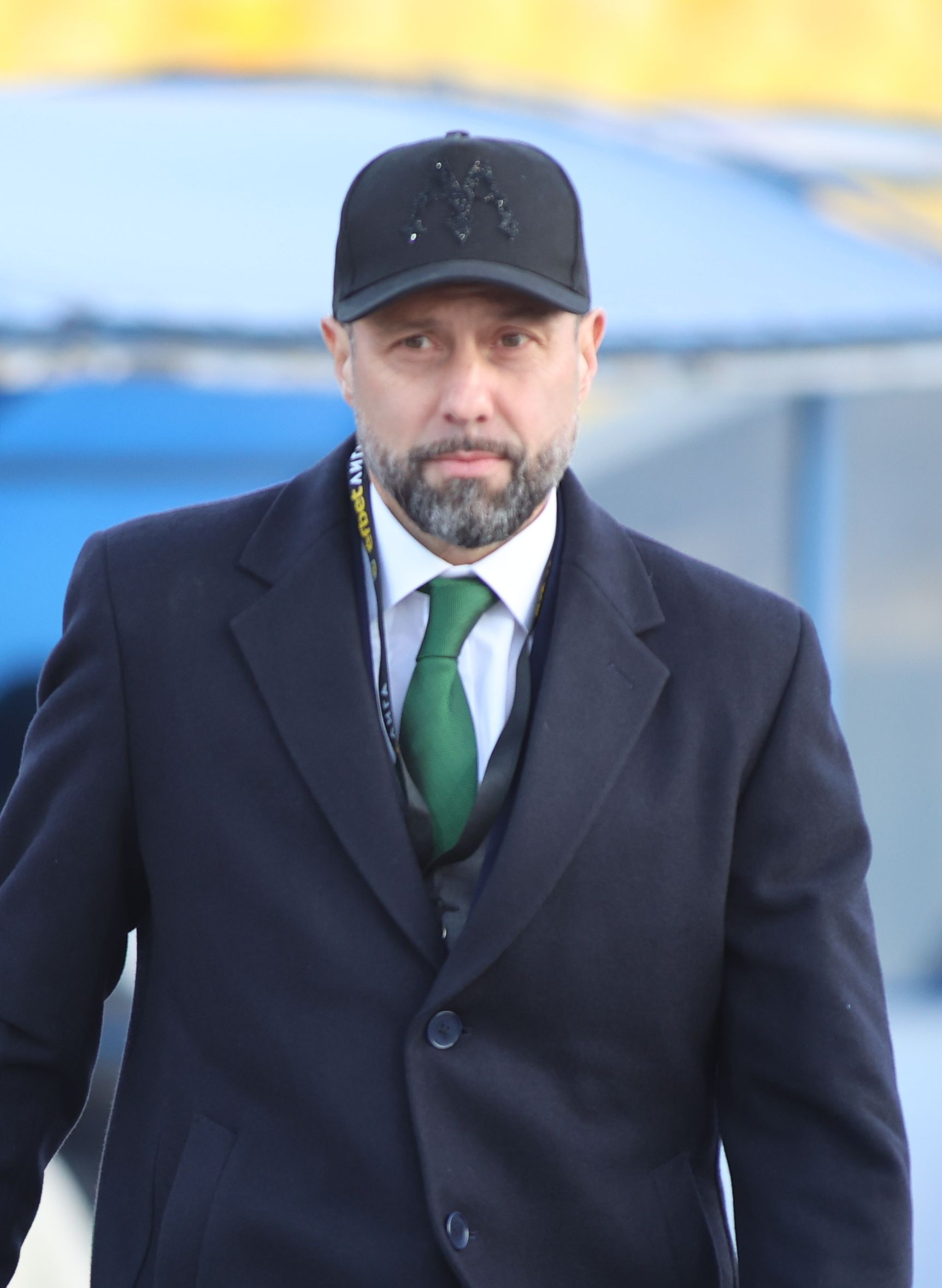
- Jovićević in 2025

Personal information
- Full name: Igor Jovićević
- Date of birth: 30 November 1973 (age 52)
- Place of birth: Zagreb, SR Croatia, Yugoslavia
- Height: 1.78 m (5 ft 10 in)
- Position: Forward

Team information
- Current team: Ludogorets Razgrad (manager)

Youth career
- 1988–1991: Dinamo Zagreb

Senior career*
Years	Team	Apps	(Gls)
1991–1995	Real Madrid Castilla	79	(15)
1996–1999	NK Zagreb	10	(0)
1999	Yokohama F. Marinos	1	(0)
2000	Guarani	4	(0)
2000–2001	NK Zagreb	0	(0)
2001–2002	Metz	0	(0)
2002	Shenyang Dongjin	24	(2)
2003	Karpaty Lviv	26	(2)
2003	Karpaty-2 Lviv	1	(0)
2004	Zhuhai		
Total		145	(19)

International career
1994–1995	Croatia U21	8	(0)

Managerial career
- 2014–2015: Karpaty Lviv (caretaker)
- 2015–2016: Karpaty Lviv
- 2016–2017: Celje
- 2017–2020: Dinamo Zagreb II
- 2018–2020: Dinamo Zagreb U19
- 2020: Dinamo Zagreb
- 2020–2022: Dnipro-1
- 2022–2023: Shakhtar Donetsk
- 2023–2024: Al-Raed
- 2024–2025: Ludogorets Razgrad
- 2025–2026: Widzew Łódź
- 2026–: Ludogorets Razgrad
- * Club domestic league appearances and goals

Igor Jovićević (Croatian pronunciation: [îgor jovǐːtɕevitɕ]; born 30 November 1973) is a Croatian professional football manager and former player who is currently in charge of Bulgarian First League club Ludogorets Razgrad.

== Playing career ==
After being labeled as the new Zvonimir Boban while playing in the youth team of the most successful Croatian club, Dinamo Zagreb, with only 17 years he signed, in summer of 1991, a contract with Real Madrid. His transfer cost was one million dollars, however, the contract was based on the fact that the Merengues, in case of lining him in the first team, would have to pay a total of five million, being that the probable cause of having him playing in the B squad. There, he was trained by Rafael Benítez, among others, and had an opportunity of playing along some youngsters, like Raúl and Guti.

On 11 June 1995, he was injured while playing against Ukraine with the Croatia national under-21 team. After having a one-year pause due to injury, he returned to Croatia to play with another club from the Croatian capital, NK Zagreb. After that, he played with J. League Division 1 club Yokohama F. Marinos, Brazilian club Guarani Futebol Clube and a short spell in France with FC Metz before moving to China to play with Shenyang Dongjin, a discrete passage in Ukraine with Karpaty Lviv before finishing his career in China, again, with a new knee ligaments injury, aged 32. After retiring, he returned to Spain, this time to Marbella, where he owns a bar.

== Managerial career ==
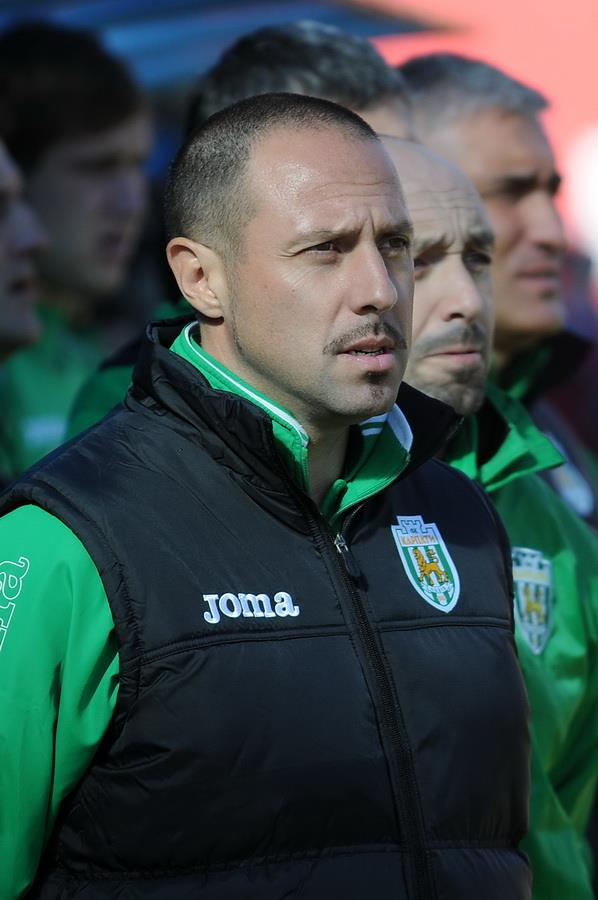
Jovićević managing Karpaty Lviv in 2014

=== Karpaty Lviv ===
In 2010, Jovićević was named the transfer director of Karpaty Lviv. In the 2012–13 season, he managed the U21 squad, and in the 2013–14 season, he led the U19 squad. Following the dismissal of Oleksandr Sevidov in the summer of 2014, he was appointed, initially as caretaker manager, of the senior squad of the club, while in 2015, he was named the head coach.

=== Celje ===
On 10 October 2016, Jovićević took over Slovenian PrvaLiga club Celje. On 19 June 2017, he terminated the contract.

=== Dinamo Zagreb ===
On 20 July 2017, Jovićević took over Dinamo Zagreb II as the head coach, while on 1 July 2018, he was named the head coach of Dinamo Zagreb U19. Managing the U19 squad, he won two Croatian league championships, the FIFA Youth Cup, and led the team in the final of the Premier League International Cup, which they lost to Bayern Munich. He also led the team to the quarter-finals in the UEFA Youth League twice.

On 22 April 2020, following the dismissal of Nenad Bjelica, Jovićević was announced as the new head coach of Dinamo Zagreb. He debuted as Dinamo manager in a 3–1 away win against Varaždin. On 6 July 2020, following a 0–2 away defeat against Rijeka, Jovićević and Dinamo came to a mutual agreement on the early termination of his contract.

=== Dnipro-1 ===
On 22 September 2020, following the dismissal of Dmytro Mykhailenko, Jovićević was announced as the new head coach of Dnipro-1. He debuted as manager in a 4–1 defeat away against FC Oleksandriya.

=== Shakhtar Donetsk ===
On 14 July 2022, Jovićević was announced as the new head coach of Shakhtar Donetsk.

=== Al-Raed ===
On 9 July 2023, Jovićević was appointed as the manager of Saudi Pro League club Al-Raed.

== Personal life ==
His father, Čedomir "Čedo" Jovićević (1952–2020) born in Žabljak, Montenegro, was the famous defender of Dinamo Zagreb, playing ten years with the most successful Croatian club. His mother, Sanja, is from Zagreb.

Igor is married and has two sons: Filip and Marcos, both players of the Dinamo Zagreb Academy.

== Career statistics ==
Appearances and goals by club, season and competition
Club	Season	League			Emperor's Cup		J.League Cup		Total	
Club	Season	Division	Apps	Goals	Apps	Goals	Apps	Goals	Apps	Goals
Yokohama F. Marinos	1999	J1 League	1	0	0	0	0	0	1	0
Total			1	0	0	0	0	0	1	0

== Managerial statistics ==
As of match played 7 November 2026

Managerial record by team and tenure
Team	From	To	Record				
Team	From	To	G	W	D	L	Win %
Karpaty Lviv	18 June 2014	31 December 2015	46	12	12	22	26.09
NK Celje	10 October 2016	19 June 2017	19	7	8	4	36.84
Dinamo Zagreb II	20 July 2017	22 April 2020	78	35	19	24	44.87
Dinamo Zagreb U19	1 July 2018	22 April 2020	15	10	3	2	66.67
Dinamo Zagreb	22 April 2020	6 July 2020	7	3	2	2	42.86
Dnipro-1	22 September 2020	14 July 2022	46	25	6	15	54.35
Shakhtar Donetsk	14 July 2022	30 June 2023	40	24	10	6	60.00
Al Raed	1 July 2023	1 June 2024	35	9	10	16	25.71
Ludogorets Razgrad	26 September 2024	9 June 2025	42	24	12	6	57.14
Widzew Łódź	15 October 2025	5 March 2026	15	5	3	7	33.33
Ludogorets Razgrad	23 September 2026	Present	5	3	1	1	60.00
Total			311	140	75	96	45.02

== Honours ==
=== Manager ===
Dinamo Zagreb U19

- U19 1. HNL: 2017–18, 2018–19
- FIFA Youth Cup: 2018
- Kvarnerska Rivijera: 2019

Shakhtar Donetsk

- Ukrainian Premier League: 2022–23

Ludogorets Razgrad

- Bulgarian First League: 2024–25
- Bulgarian Cup: 2024–25
- Bulgarian Supercup: 2024

Individual

- Ukrainian Premier League Manager of the Month: October 2020
