= Edvin Kurtulus =

Swedish footballer (born 2000)

Personal information
- Date of birth: 5 March 2000 (age 26)
- Place of birth: Halmstad, Sweden
- Height: 1.85 m (6 ft 1 in)
- Positions: Centre-back; right-back

Team information
- Current team: Ludogorets Razgrad
- Number: 15

Youth career
- 2005–2019: Halmstads BK

Senior career*
Years	Team	Apps	(Gls)
2019–2021	Halmstads BK	58	(1)
2022–2024	Hammarby IF	66	(3)
2024–	Ludogorets Razgrad	43	(1)

International career^{‡}
2020–2022	Kosovo U21	12	(0)
2022–	Sweden	4	(0)
- * Club domestic league appearances and goals as of 10:20, 9 September 2026 (UTC) ‡ National team caps and goals as of 23:53, 16 June 2023 (UTC)

Edvin Kurtulus (Albanian: Edvin Kurtulush, Turkish: Edvin Kurtuluş; born 5 March 2000) is a Swedish professional footballer who plays as a centre-back or right-back for Ludogorets Razgrad.

== Club career ==
=== Halmstads BK ===
At the age of five, Kurtulus started to play football with local club Halmstads BK. In 2018 and 2019, as a youth player, he went on trial with both Fenerbahçe in Turkey and Copenhagen in Denmark.

On 20 December 2018, Kurtulus signed his first professional contract with Halmstad. On 5 May 2019, he made his debut in Superettan, Sweden's second tier, in a 0–1 loss to Östers IF. After impressing manager Magnus Haglund, Kurtulus ended the season making 11 league appearances, of which he started ten, mostly as a right-back.

In 2020, Kurtulus continued as a starter for Halmstad when the club won Superettan and secured a promotion to Allsvenskan. He made 18 league appearances in total, mostly playing as a centre-back, before his season was cut short in September when he was diagnosed with pericarditis.

In 2021, Kurtulus was a key player for Halmstad in Allsvenskan, playing 29 league games. The club eventually suffered from a relegation after losing to Helsingborgs IF with 1–3 on aggregate in the relegation play-offs.

=== Hammarby IF ===
On 12 August 2021, Kurtulus signed a three-year deal with fellow Allsvenskan club Hammarby IF, effective in January 2022. On 20 February 2022, he made his debut with Hammarby in the 2021–22 Svenska Cupen group stage against Falkenbergs FF after coming on as a substitute at 62nd minute in place of Simon Sandberg. His league debut with Hammarby came on 2 April in a 2–1 home win against Helsingborgs IF after coming on as a substitute at 83rd minute in place of Richard Magyar. Seven days after league debut, Kurtulus scored his first goal for Hammarby in his fifth appearance for the club in a 1–5 away win over GIF Sundsvall in Allsvenskan. Kurtulus featured in the final of the 2021–22 Svenska Cupen, in which Hammarby lost by 4–5 on penalties to Malmö FF after the game ended in a 0–0 draw. In total, Kurtulus went on to make 27 league appearances for the club, that finished 3rd in the 2022 Allsvenskan table.

On 17 February 2023, Kurtulus signed a new three-year contract with Hammarby. On 2 April, he was appointed as the new vice-captain of the club, behind Nahir Besara. Throughout the 2023 season, Kurtulus made 27 league appearances in Allsvenskan, although Hammarby disappointedly finished 7th in the table. In August the same year, the club reportedly accepted an offer worth around €3 million from Sturm Graz for his transfer, but Kurtulus turned down the move.

=== Ludogorets Razgrad ===
In June 2024, he joined Bulgarian team Ludogorets Razgrad.

== International career ==
=== Kosovo ===
==== Under-21 ====
On 29 August 2020, Kurtulus received a call-up from Kosovo U21 for the 2021 UEFA European Under-21 Championship qualification match against England U21, and made his debut in the 0–6 loss after being named in the starting line-up.

==== Senior ====
On 23 May 2022, Kurtulus received a call-up from Kosovo for the 2022–23 UEFA Nations League matches against Cyprus, Greece (twice) and Northern Ireland. Four days later, the Football Federation of Kosovo confirmed through a press conference that Kurtulus will not be part of the team after deciding to represent Sweden national team.

=== Sweden ===
On 30 May 2022, the Swedish Football Association announced that FIFA had given Kurtulus permission to play for their national team and that he had been called-up to replace the injured Victor Lindelöf and Martin Olsson for the 2022–23 UEFA Nations League matches against Slovenia, Norway (twice) and Serbia. His debut with Sweden came on 9 June in the 2022–23 UEFA Nations League match against Serbia after coming on as a substitute in the 42nd minute in place of Joakim Nilsson.

== Personal life ==
Kurtulus was born in Halmstad, Sweden to parents with roots from Prizren. His grandparents had emigrated as muhaxhir to Turkey where they took the surname Kurtuluş (meaning "liberation" in Turkish) due to the Turkish surname law. In the 1960s, Kurtulus' family migrated to Sweden, where Edvin's father was born.

Edvin's younger brother Bleon Kurtulus is also a professional footballer and plays for his hometown club of Halmstads BK.

== Career statistics ==
=== Club ===
As of match played 9 September 2026

Appearances and goals by club, season and competition
Club	Season	League			Cup		Other		Total	
Club	Season	Division	Apps	Goals	Apps	Goals	Apps	Goals	Apps	Goals
Halmstads BK	2019	Superettan	11	0	1	0	—		12	0
Halmstads BK	2020	Superettan	18	1	4	0	—		22	1
Halmstads BK	2021	Allsvenskan	29	0	1	0	2 (Note: Appearances in the Allsvenskan relegation play-offs)	0	32	0
Halmstads BK	Total		58	1	6	0	2	0	66	1
Hammarby IF	2022	Allsvenskan	27	2	5	0	—		32	2
Hammarby IF	2023	Allsvenskan	27	0	6	1	1 (Note: Appearances in UEFA Europa Conference League)	0	34	1
Hammarby IF	2024	Allsvenskan	12	1	0	0	—		12	1
Hammarby IF	Total		66	3	11	1	1	0	78	4
Ludogorets Razgrad	2024–25	Bulgarian First League	26	0	6	1	8	0	40	1
Ludogorets Razgrad	2025–26	Bulgarian First League	12	1	1	0	9	1	22	2
Ludogorets Razgrad	2026–27	Bulgarian First League	5	0	0	0	2	0	7	0
Ludogorets Razgrad	Total		43	1	7	1	19	1	69	3
Career total			167	5	24	2	21	1	212	8

=== International ===
As of 16 June 2023

Appearances and goals by national team and year
National team	Year	Apps	Goals
Sweden
Sweden	2022	2	0
Sweden	2023	2	0
Total		4	0
