= Olivier Verdon =

Beninese footballer (born 1995)

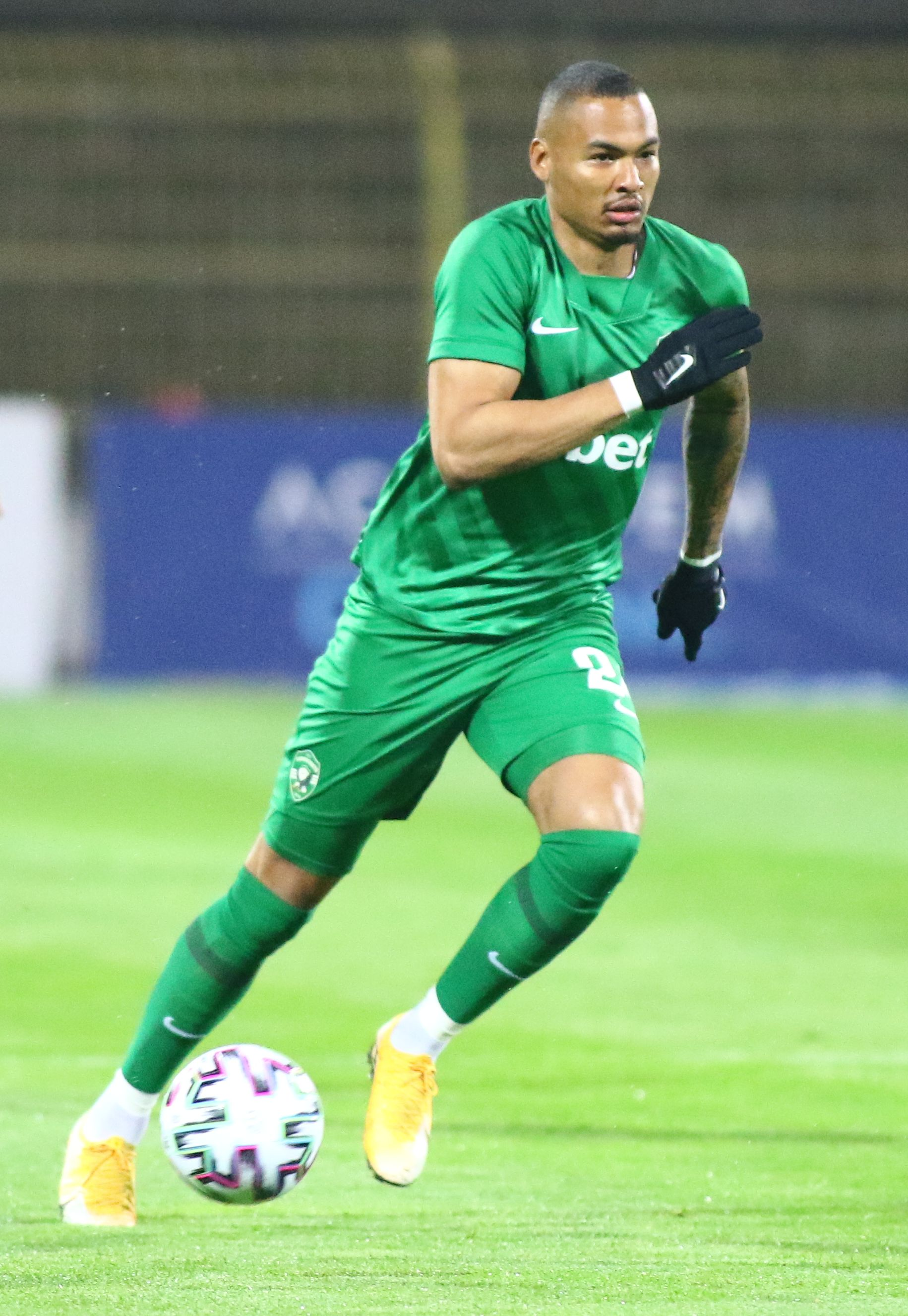
- Verdon with Ludogorets Razgrad in 2021

Personal information
- Full name: Olivier Jacques Verdon
- Date of birth: 5 October 1995 (age 31)
- Place of birth: Clamart, France
- Height: 1.91 m (6 ft 3 in)
- Position: Centre-back

Team information
- Current team: Maccabi Netanya

Youth career
- –2014: Angoulême

Senior career*
Years	Team	Apps	(Gls)
2014–2016	Angoulême	32	(2)
2016–2018	Bordeaux B	37	(4)
2017–2018	Bordeaux	1	(0)
2018–2019	Sochaux	30	(2)
2019–2021	Alavés	0	(0)
2019–2020	→ Eupen (loan)	22	(0)
2020–2021	→ Ludogorets Razgrad (loan)	19	(0)
2021–2026	Ludogorets Razgrad	120	(12)
2026–	Maccabi Netanya	0	(0)

International career^{‡}
2017–	Benin	46	(0)
- * Club domestic league appearances and goals as of 5 September 2026 ‡ National team caps and goals as of 13 December 2025 (UTC)

Olivier Jacques Verdon (born 5 October 1995) is a Beninese professional footballer who plays as a centre-back for Israeli Premier League club Maccabi Netanya. Born in France, he represents Benin at international level.

== Club career ==
Verdon signed his first professional contract on 27 April 2017 with Ligue 1 club FC Girondins de Bordeaux after successful seasons with their B team. He made his professional debut for Bordeaux in a Ligue 1 match against Olympique Marseille on 19 November 2017. He came on for Igor Lewczuk in the 80th minute of the 1–1 home draw.

On 11 June 2019, after a year with Ligue 2 side FC Sochaux-Montbéliard, Verdon signed a three-year contract with Deportivo Alavés in La Liga. On 2 September, however, he was loaned to KAS Eupen of the Belgian First Division A.

On 4 September 2020, Verdon joined Bulgarian club Ludogorets Razgrad on loan. He spent the 2020–21 season on loan, helping the club win the league title. After completing a permanent transfer in June 2021, he established himself as a regular defender for the team.

During his time at Ludogorets, Verdon won five Bulgarian First League titles, two Bulgarian Cup titles and five Bulgarian Supercup titles, collecting a total of 12 trophies.

On 5 September 2026, Verdon left Ludogorets after mutually agreeing to terminate his contract. He brought his six-year spell at the club to an end, concluding his career in Bulgarian football.

On 14 September 2026, Verdon signed a two-year contract with Israeli club Maccabi Netanya, with an option to extend for a further year. He joined the club as a free agent following his departure from Ludogorets.

== International career ==
Born in France, Verdon was eligible to represent the Benin national team through his mother, who is of Beninese descent. He made his senior international debut on 24 March 2017, coming on as a second-half substitute in a friendly against the Mauritania. Benin lost the match 1–0.

In June 2017, Verdon featured in a 2019 Africa Cup of Nations qualifying match against the Gambia. In November of the same year, he also appeared in friendly matches against the Republic of the Congo and Tanzania.

In June 2019, Verdon participated in the 2019 Africa Cup of Nations. He played in all three of Benin's group-stage matches, with the team recording three draws to advance to the round of 16. Benin then defeated the Morocco 4–1 on penalties after a 1–1 draw following extra time. However, they were eliminated in the quarter-finals after losing 1–0 to the Senegal.

In December 2025, Verdon participated in the 2025 Africa Cup of Nations. He started in all three of Benin's group-stage matches against the DR Congo, the Botswana and the Senegal. Benin advanced to the round of 16, where they were eliminated after losing 3–1 to the Egypt following extra time on 5 January 2026.

== Legal issues ==
In 2019 Verdon was arrested for domestic violence. In 2021 a former partner of Verdon's filed a complaint accusing him of domestic violence, threats, and false imprisonment in incidents that took place in 2020.

== Career statistics ==
=== Club ===
As of match played 6 April 2026

Appearances and goals by club, season and competition
Club	Season	League			National cup (Note: Includes Coupe de France, Copa del Rey, Belgian Cup, Hungarian Cup)		Continental		Other		Total	
Club	Season	Division	Apps	Goals	Apps	Goals	Apps	Goals	Apps	Goals	Apps	Goals
Angoulême	2014–15	Championnat National 3	21	1	0	0	—		—		21	1
Angoulême	2015–16	Championnat National 3	11	1	0	0	—		—		11	1
Angoulême	Total		32	2	0	0	—		—		32	2
Bordeaux B	2015–16	Championnat National 3	6	0	—		—		—		6	0
Bordeaux B	2016–17	Championnat National 3	21	0	—		—		—		21	0
Bordeaux B	2017–18	Championnat National 3	10	4	—		—		—		10	4
Bordeaux B	Total		37	4	—		—		—		37	4
Bordeaux	2017–18	Ligue 1	1	0	0	0	—		0	0	1	0
Sochaux	2018–19	Ligue 2	30	2	0	0	—		0	0	30	2
Eupen (loan)	2019–20	Belgian Pro League	22	0	2	0	—		—		24	0
Ludogorets Razgrad (loan)	2020–21	Bulgarian First League	19	0	4	0	7 (Note: Appearances in UEFA Europa League)	0	—		30	0
Ludogorets Razgrad	2021–22	Bulgarian First League	22	3	3	0	13 (Note: Eight appearances in UEFA Champions League, five appearances in UEFA Europa League)	0	1 (Note: Appearance in Bulgarian Super Cup)	0	39	3
Ludogorets Razgrad	2022–23	Bulgarian First League	25	1	3	0	14 (Note: Six appearances in UEFA Champions League, eight appearances and one goal in UEFA Europa League)	1	1	0	43	2
Ludogorets Razgrad	2023–24	Bulgarian First League	27	2	2	0	14 (Note: Two appearances in UEFA Champions League, four appearances and one goal in UEFA Europa League, eight appearances and one goal in UEFA Europa Conference League)	2	1	1	44	5
Ludogorets Razgrad	2024–25	First League	27	3	3	0	13 (Note: six appearances in UEFA Champions League, seven appearances in UEFA Europa League)	0	1	0	44	3
Ludogorets Razgrad	2025–26	First League	19	3	1	0	14 (Note: four appearances in UEFA Champions League, nine appearances and one goal in UEFA Europa League)	1	1	0	35	4
Ludogorets Razgrad	Ludogorets Total		139	12	16	0	75	4	5	1	235	17
Career total			261	20	18	0	75	4	5	1	359	25

=== International ===
As of matches played on 13 December 2025

Appearances and goals by national team and year
National team	Year	Apps	Goals
Benin national team	2017	5	0
Benin national team	2018	4	0
Benin national team	2019	12	0
Benin national team	2020	1	0
Benin national team	2021	4	0
Benin national team	2022	5	0
Benin national team	2023	5	0
Benin national team	2025	6	0
Benin national team	2026	4	0
Total		46	0

== Honours ==
Ludogorets Razgrad

- Bulgarian First League: (5) 2020–21, 2021–22, 2022–23, 2023–24, 2024–25
- Bulgarian Supercup: (5) 2021, 2022, 2023, 2024, 2025
- Bulgarian Cup: (2) 2022–23, 2024–25
