= Ivan Yordanov =

Bulgarian footballer

Personal information
- Full name: Ivan Orlinov Yordanov
- Date of birth: 7 November 2000 (age 26)
- Place of birth: Rakovski, Bulgaria
- Height: 1.70 m (5 ft 7 in)
- Position: Midfielder

Team information
- Current team: Lokomotiv Sofia (on loan from Ludogorets)
- Number: 8

Youth career
- 2007–2010: Rakovski
- 2010–2017: Botev 2002
- 2017–2018: Ludogorets Razgrad

Senior career*
Years	Team	Apps	(Gls)
2018–	Ludogorets II	80	(8)
2019–	Ludogorets Razgrad	49	(1)
2023	→ Spartak Varna (loan)	16	(1)
2026–	→ Lokomotiv Sofia (loan)	0	(0)

International career^{‡}
2018	Bulgaria U18	1	(0)
2022–	Bulgaria	4	(0)
- * Club domestic league appearances and goals as of 18:45, 8 September 2026 (UTC) ‡ National team caps and goals as of 20:23, 7 September 2023 (UTC)

Ivan Orlinov Yordanov (Bulgarian: Иван Орлинов Йорданов; born 7 November 2000) is a Bulgarian footballer who plays as a midfielder for Lokomotiv Sofia, on loan from Ludogorets Razgrad.

== Career ==
Yordanov joined Ludogorets academy in 2017 from Botev 2002. He made his senior debut with the reserves in the Bulgarian Second League on 13 May 2018, playing full 90 minutes in a 4–0 away loss against Montana. On 1 October 2018, Yordanov scored his first goal for Ludogorets II in a 2–2 home draw against Pomorie. In December 2018, he signed a professional contract with the club.

Yordanov made his first team debut on 13 July 2019, coming on as a second-half substitute for Dominik Yankov in a 2–0 home league win over Tsarsko Selo.

In June 2021, Yordanov was fully promoted to the first team by the first team manager, Valdas Dambrauskas.

In January 2023 Yordanov was sent on loan to Spartak Varna until the end of the season. He made his league debut on 20 February in a match against Hebar Pazardzhik. A week later he scored his first goal for the team in a league win against Botev Vratsa becoming also the man of the match.

In August, Yordanov returned to Ludogorets and became part of the main squad. On 21 September 2023 he scored his first goal in UEFA Europa Conference League against Spartak Trnava, for the 4:0 win.

== International career ==
On 5 September 2022, Yordanov received his first call-up for the Bulgaria national team for the UEFA Nations League games against Gibraltar and North Macedonia on 23 and 26 September 2022. He made his debut for the team on 26 September, coming as a substitute in the match against North Macedonia, won by Bulgaria by 0–1.

== Career statistics ==
=== Club ===
As of 13 December 2025

Appearances and goals by club, season and competition
Club	Season	League			Bulgarian Cup		Europe		Other (Note: Includes Bulgarian Supercup matches.)		Total	
Club	Season	Division	Apps	Goals	Apps	Goals	Apps	Goals	Apps	Goals	Apps	Goals
Ludogorets II	2017–18	Second League	2	0	–		–		–		2	0
Ludogorets II	2018–19	Second League	24	2	–		–		–		24	2
Ludogorets II	2019–20	Second League	18	2	–		–		–		18	2
Ludogorets II	2020–21	Second League	18	1	–		–		–		18	1
Ludogorets II	2021–22	Second League	3	0	–		–		–		3	0
Ludogorets II	2022–23	Second League	2	0	–		–		–		2	0
Ludogorets II	2024–25	Second League	4	1	–		–		–		4	1
Ludogorets II	2025–26	Second League	3	0	–		–		–		3	0
Ludogorets II	Total		74	6	0	0	0	0	0	0	74	6
Ludogorets	2019–20	First League	2	0	1	0	0	0	0	0	3	0
Ludogorets	2020–21	First League	3	0	0	0	2	0	0	0	5	0
Ludogorets	2021–22	First League	0	0	0	0	0	0	0	0	0	0
Ludogorets	2022–23	First League	7	1	0	0	4	0	0	0	11	1
Ludogorets	2023–24	First League	10	0	1	0	9	1	0	0	20	1
Ludogorets	2024–25	First League	18	0	5	0	4	0	1 (Note: Appearances in Bulgarian Supercup)	0	28	0
Ludogorets	2025–26	First League	9	0	1	1	5	1	0 (Note: Appearances in Bulgarian Supercup)	0	15	2
Ludogorets	Total		49	1	8	1	24	2	1	0	82	4
Spartak Varna (loan)	2022–23	First League	16	1	0	0	0	0	0	0	16	1
Career total			139	8	8	1	24	2	1	0	172	11

=== International ===
As of 7 September 2023

Appearances and goals by national team and year
National team	Year	Apps	Goals
Bulgaria	2022	1	0
Bulgaria	2023	3	0
Bulgaria	Total	4	0
