= Dinis Almeida =

Portuguese footballer

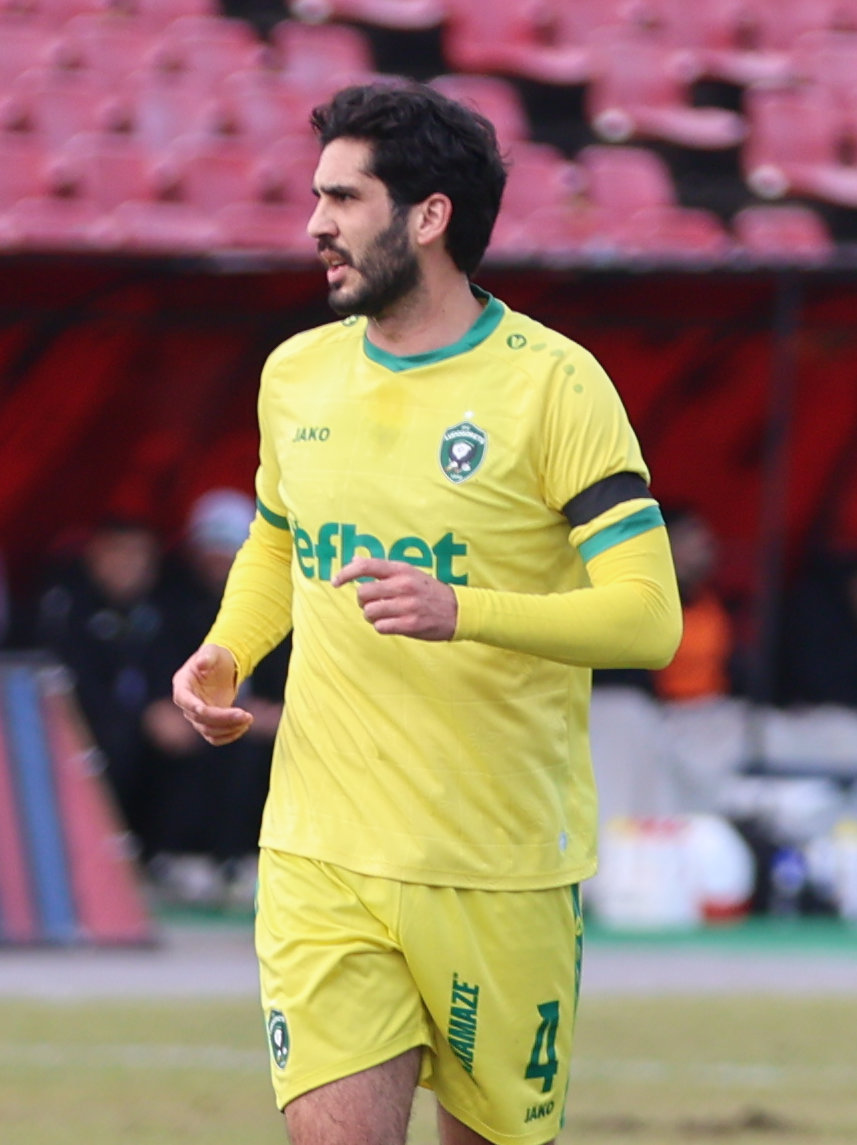

Personal information
- Full name: Dinis Costa Lima Almeida
- Date of birth: 28 June 1995 (age 31)
- Place of birth: Esposende, Portugal
- Height: 1.90 m (6 ft 3 in)
- Position: Centre-back

Team information
- Current team: CSKA Sofia
- Number: 4

Youth career
- 2005–2011: Marinhas
- 2011–2013: Varzim

Senior career*
Years	Team	Apps	(Gls)
2013–2014	Joane	32	(7)
2014–2016	Reus	33	(3)
2016–2019	Monaco	0	(0)
2016–2017	→ Belenenses (loan)	6	(1)
2017–2018	→ Braga B (loan)	24	(2)
2018–2019	→ Xanthi (loan)	21	(2)
2019–2021	Lokomotiv Plovdiv	53	(7)
2021–2023	Antwerp	32	(0)
2023–2026	Ludogorets Razgrad	61	(5)
2026–	CSKA Sofia	5	(0)

International career
2014	Portugal U19	1	(0)
2014–2015	Portugal U20	3	(0)
- * Club domestic league appearances and goals as of 17:52, 22 November 2026 (UTC)

Dinis Costa Lima Almeida (born 28 June 1995) is a Portuguese professional footballer who plays as a central defender for First Professional Football League club CSKA Sofia.

== Club career ==
Born in Esposende, Braga District, Almeida finished his development at Varzim SC. His senior debut occurred in 2013–14, as he scored a career-best seven goals to help G.D. Joane finish fifth in the regular season third division but eventually being relegated.

Almeida then spent two years in the Spanish Segunda División B, with CF Reus Deportiu. In the summer of 2016 he signed with AS Monaco FC, being immediately loaned to C.F. Os Belenenses of Portugal's Primeira Liga. He made his debut in the competition on 27 August, coming on as a 46th-minute substitute in a 1–0 away win against C.D. Tondela. His only goal arrived in his fourth appearance, helping the visitors to a 3–1 away defeat of Sporting CP.

On 31 August 2017, still owned by Monaco, Almeida was loaned to S.C. Braga, being assigned to their reserves in the Segunda Liga. He joined Xanthi F.C. on loan for the following campaign, scoring his first goal for the Greek club on 17 February 2019 in a 1–1 draw away to Athlitiki Enosi Larissa FC.

Almeida spent the following seasons also abroad, with PFC Lokomotiv Plovdiv (winning the Bulgarian Cup in 2019–20 after a penalty shootout defeat of PFC CSKA Sofia, where he converted his attempt) and Royal Antwerp FC (Belgian Pro League). He returned to Bulgaria in January 2023, agreeing to a contract at PFC Ludogorets Razgrad; shortly after arriving, he ruptured the anterior cruciate ligament in his right knee, being sidelined for several months.

Almeida scored his first goal in the UEFA Champions League on 6 August 2024, opening a 2–1 away win over Qarabağ FK in the third qualifying round through a 56th-minute header. He also featured in the second leg, a 7–2 extra time loss.

Ahead of the 2026–27 season, Almeida remained in the First Professional Football League on a two-year contract at CSKA Sofia.

== Career statistics ==
As of match played 22 November October 2026

Appearances and goals by club, season and competition
Club	Season	League			National cup		League cup		Continental		Other		Total	
Club	Season	Division	Apps	Goals	Apps	Goals	Apps	Goals	Apps	Goals	Apps	Goals	Apps	Goals
Joane	2013–14	Campeonato de Portugal	32	7	0	0	—		—		—		32	7
Reus	2014–15	Segunda División B	14	1	0	0	—		—		—		14	1
Reus	2015–16	Segunda División B	19	2	1	0	—		—		—		20	2
Reus	Total		33	3	1	0	—		—		—		34	3
Belenenses (loan)	2016–17	Primeira Liga	6	1	0	0	1	1	—		—		7	2
Braga B (loan)	2017–18	Liga Portugal 2	24	2	—		—		—		—		24	2
Xanthi (loan)	2018–19	Super League Greece	21	2	4	0	—		—		—		25	2
Lokomotiv Plovdiv	2019–20	First Professional Football League	23	3	6	1	—		—		—		29	4
Lokomotiv Plovdiv	2020–21	First Professional Football League	30	4	1	0	—		1 (Note: Appearances in UEFA Europa League)	0	1 (Note: Appearance in Bulgarian Super Cup)	0	33	4
Lokomotiv Plovdiv	Total		53	7	7	1	—		1	0	1	0	62	8
Antwerp	2021–22	Belgian Pro League	24	0	0	0	—		6	0	—		30	0
Antwerp	2022–23	Belgian Pro League	8	0	1	0	—		4 (Note: Appearances in UEFA Europa Conference League)	2	—		13	2
Antwerp	Total		32	0	1	0	—		10	2	—		43	2
Ludogorets Razgrad	2023–24	First Professional Football League	11	1	4	1	—		2 (Note: Appearances in UEFA Champions League)	0	0	0	17	2
Ludogorets Razgrad	2024–25	First Professional Football League	27	3	4	0	—		16	4	1	1	48	8
Ludogorets Razgrad	2025–26	First Professional Football League	23	1	5	0	—		13	0	—		41	1
Ludogorets Razgrad	Total		61	5	13	1	—		31	4	1	1	106	11
CSKA Sofia	2026–27	First Professional Football League	5	0	0	0	—		3	1	1	0	9	1
Career total			267	27	26	2	1	1	45	7	3	1	342	38

== Honours ==
Lokomotiv Plovdiv

- Bulgarian Cup: 2019–20
- Bulgarian Supercup: 2020

Ludogorets Razgrad

- First Professional Football League: 2023–24, 2024–25
- Bulgarian Cup: 2024–25
- Bulgarian Supercup: 2023, 2024

CSKA Sofia

- Bulgarian Supercup: 2026
