= Samuel Akere =

Nigerian footballer

Personal information
- Date of birth: 16 February 2004 (age 22)
- Place of birth: Abeokuta, Nigeria
- Height: 1.78 m (5 ft 10 in)
- Position: Winger

Team information
- Current team: Wisła Płock (on loan from Widzew Łódź)
- Number: 57

Youth career
- G12 FC
- 2021–2022: FDC Vista

Senior career*
Years	Team	Apps	(Gls)
2022–2023	Botev Plovdiv II	23	(3)
2022–2025	Botev Plovdiv	70	(8)
2025–	Widzew Łódź	16	(1)
2026	→ Osijek (loan)	18	(3)
2026–	→ Wisła Płock (loan)	1	(1)
- * Club domestic league appearances and goals as of 19:17, 15 September 2026 (UTC)

Samuel Akere (born 16 February 2004) is a Nigerian professional footballer who plays as a winger for Ekstraklasa club Wisła Płock, on loan from Widzew Łódź.

== Club career ==
Akere started his career in the Nigerian G12 academy, before joining FDC Vista academy based in Russia. On 4 May 2022, he moved to Bulgarian club Botev Plovdiv. His good form resulted in Akere gaining a regular spot in Botev's line-up, and on 27 November 2023 he extended his contract with the club. On 4 June 2025, Akere joined Ekstraklasa side Widzew Łódź, signing a contract until 2029 with the option to extend.

On 5 January 2026, Akere was loaned from Widzew to Croatian side Osijek for the remainder of the 2025–26 season, with an option for Osijek to make the move permanent.

He returned to Widzew in the summer of 2026, and made a single league appearance before joining fellow Ekstraklasa club Wisła Płock on loan with an option to buy on 9 September.

== Honours ==
Botev Plovdiv

- Bulgarian Cup: 2023–24
