= 2025–26 PFC Ludogorets Razgrad season =

Ludogorets Razgrad
2025–26 season
- Chairman: Temenuga Gazdova
- Manager: Rui Mota (until 28 October); Todor Zhivondov (caretaker) (from 29 October until 20 November); Per-Mathias Høgmo (from 21 November)
- Stadium: Huvepharma Arena
- First League: 3rd
- Bulgarian Cup: Semi-finals
- Bulgarian Supercup: Winners
- Champions League: Third qualifying round
- UEFA Europa League: Knockout phase
- Top goalscorer: League: Ivaylo Chochev (17); All: Ivaylo Chochev (21)
- Highest home attendance: 6,746 v Ferencváros; 6 August 2025 (Champions League)
- Lowest home attendance: 380 v Botev Vratsa; 30 November 2025 (First League)
- Average home league attendance: 1,267
- Biggest win: 5–0 v Septemvri (Home); 19 July 2025 (First League)
- Biggest defeat: 0–3 v Ferencváros (Away); 12 August 2025 (Champions League)
Home colours	Away colours	Third colours

The 2025–26 season is Ludogorets Razgrad's fifteenth consecutive season in the First League, of which they are defending champions.

== Managerial changes ==
On the 29th October, Ludogorets confirmed that Todor Zhivondov would be taking over duties as interim head coach, after talks were initiated with Rui Mota regarding his termination as head coach. Ludogorets officially parted ways with Mota on the 4th of November, alongside confirming Zhivondov as interim coach. On the 21st November, Ludogorets unveiled Per-Mathias Høgmo as their new head coach.

== Squad information ==
=== First-team squad ===
As of 8 January 2026

Note: Flags indicate national team as defined under FIFA eligibility rules. Players may hold more than one non-FIFA nationality.

No.	Player	Nat.	Position(s)	Date of birth (age)	Height	Preferred foot	Signed		Transfer fee	Contract ends	Apps.	Goals	Assists	Ref.
No.	Player	Nat.	Position(s)	Date of birth (age)	Height	Preferred foot	On	From	Transfer fee	Contract ends	Apps.	Goals	Assists	Ref.
Goalkeepers
1	Sergio Padt	(Royal Dutch Football Association) (Italian Football Federation)	GK	6 June 1990 (aged 35)	1.97 m (6 ft 5 1/2 in)	Right	1 July 2021	(Royal Dutch Football Association) Groningen	Free	30 June 2027	132	0	0	
39	Hendrik Bonmann	(German Football Association)	GK	22 January 1994 (aged 31)	1.94 m (6 ft 4 1/2 in)	Right	1 July 2024	(Austrian Football Association) Wolfsberger	Free	30 June 2027	27	0	0	
67	Damyan Hristov (HG, CT)	(Bulgarian Football Union)	GK	10 November 2002 (aged 23)	1.88 m (6 ft 2 in)	Right	26 May 2021	(Bulgarian Football Union) Ludogorets Academy		30 June 2026	7	0	0	
Defenders
2	Joel Andersson	(Swedish Football Association)	RB	11 November 1996 (aged 29)	1.78 m (5 ft 10 in)	Right	8 July 2025	(Danish Football Association) Midtjylland	€710K	30 June 2028	0	0	0	
3	Anton Nedyalkov (C) (AT)	(Bulgarian Football Union)	LB / CB	30 April 1993 (aged 32)	1.81 m (5 ft 11 1/2 in)	Both	1 July 2018	(United States Soccer Federation) Dallas	€2M	30 June 2027	211	3	21	
4	Dinis Almeida	(Portuguese Football Federation)	CB	28 June 1995 (aged 30)	1.86 m (6 ft 1 in)	Right	6 January 2023	(Royal Belgian Football Association) Antwerp	—N/a	30 June 2026	63	9	2	
5	Georgi Terziev (AT)	(Bulgarian Football Union)	CB	18 April 1992 (aged 33)	1.83 m (6 ft 0 in)	Both	12 August 2013	(Bulgarian Football Union) Chernomorets	€600K	30 June 2026	233	7	4	
15	Edvin Kurtulus	(Swedish Football Association) (Football Federation of Kosovo)	CB / RB	5 March 2000 (aged 25)	1.87 m (6 ft 1 1/2 in)	Right	1 July 2024	(Swedish Football Association) Hammarby	€1.45M	30 June 2027	41	1	0	
17	Son	(Royal Spanish Football Federation)	RB / LB	30 March 1994 (aged 31)	1.78 m (5 ft 10 in)	Right	7 July 2023	(Royal Spanish Football Federation) Levante	€100K	30 June 2026	92	7	15	
24	Olivier Verdon	(Benin Football Federation) (French Football Federation)	CB	5 October 1995 (aged 30)	1.90 m (6 ft 3 in)	Right	1 July 2021	(Royal Spanish Football Federation) Alavés	€1M	30 June 2027	200	13	1	
27	Vinícius Nogueira (NE)	(Brazilian Football Confederation)	LB	11 December 2001 (aged 24)	1.80 m (5 ft 11 in)	Left	8 January 2026	(Swedish Football Association) Halmstad	€750K	31 December 2028	0	0	0	
32	Pipa	(Royal Spanish Football Federation)	RB	26 January 1998 (aged 27)	1.76 m (5 ft 9 1/2 in)	Right	1 February 2023	(Hellenic Football Federation) Olympiacos	€600K	30 June 2026	19	0	0	
42	Simeon Shishkov (HG, CT)	(Bulgarian Football Union)	CB / LB	18 May 2006 (aged 19)	—N/a	Left	1 July 2025	(Bulgarian Football Union) Ludogorets Academy		30 June 2028	1	0	0	
55	Idan Nachmias	(Israel Football Association) (Portuguese Football Federation)	CB	17 March 1997 (aged 28)	1.90 m (6 ft 3 in)	Right	2 August 2025	(Israel Football Association) Maccabi Tel Aviv	Free	30 June 2028	0	0	0	
Midfielders
14	Petar Stanić	(Football Association of Serbia) (Croatian Football Federation)	AM / CM	14 August 2001 (aged 24)	1.86 m (6 ft 1 in)	Both	18 July 2025	(Football Association of Serbia) TSC	€2.1M	30 June 2028	0	0	0	
18	Ivaylo Chochev (AT)	(Bulgarian Football Union)	CM / DM	18 February 1993 (aged 32)	1.90 m (6 ft 3 in)	Both	15 February 2024	(Bulgarian Football Union) CSKA 1948	€500K	30 June 2028	67	10	6	
20	Aguibou Camara (NE)	(Guinean Football Federation)	AM	20 May 2001 (aged 24)	1.70 m (5 ft 7 in)	Right	16 July 2024	(Hellenic Football Federation) Olympiacos	€1.09M	30 June 2027	42	3	4	
23	Deroy Duarte	(Cape Verdean Football Federation) (Royal Dutch Football Association)	DM / CM	4 July 1999 (aged 26)	1.77 m (5 ft 9 1/2 in)	Right	1 July 2024	(Royal Dutch Football Association) Fortuna Sittard	Free	30 June 2028	47	1	1	
26	Filip Kaloč	(Football Association of the Czech Republic)	CM	27 February 2000 (aged 25)	1.90 m (6 ft 3 in)	Right	1 July 2025	(German Football Association) Kaiserslautern	€2.8M	30 June 2028	0	0	0	
30	Pedro Naressi (VC) (NE)	(Brazilian Football Confederation)	DM	10 January 1998 (aged 27)	1.78 m (5 ft 10 in)	Right	2 September 2022	(Brazilian Football Confederation) Ceará	€750K	30 June 2026	125	4	6	
80	Metodiy Stefanov (HG, CT)	(Bulgarian Football Union)	CM	5 August 2000 (aged 25)	1.80 m (5 ft 11 in)	Right	1 July 2025	(Bulgarian Football Union) Ludogorets Academy		30 June 2026	4	0	0	
82	Ivan Yordanov (HG, CT)	(Bulgarian Football Union)	DM / LB	7 November 2000 (aged 25)	1.76 m (5 ft 9 1/2 in)	Left	1 July 2022	(Bulgarian Football Union) Ludogorets Academy		30 June 2028	68	2	6	
Forwards
7	Alberto Salido	(Royal Spanish Football Federation)	CF / AM	19 January 2000 (aged 25)	1.71 m (5 ft 7 1/2 in)	Right	24 February 2026	(Bulgarian Football Union) Beroe	€1M	31 December 2028	0	0	0	
9	Kwadwo Duah	(Swiss Football Association) (Ghana Football Association)	CF	24 February 1997 (aged 28)	1.85 m (6 ft 1 in)	Right	19 July 2023	(German Football Association) Nürnberg	€3.5M	30 June 2028	77	26	7	
10	Matheus Machado (NE)	(Brazilian Football Confederation)	CF / RW	13 March 2003 (aged 22)	1.86 m (6 ft 1 in)	Left	30 July 2025	(Saudi Arabian Football Federation) Al Fateh (loan)	—N/a	30 June 2026	0	0	0	
11	Caio Vidal	(Brazilian Football Confederation) (Bulgarian Football Union)	LW / RW	4 November 2000 (aged 25)	1.74 m (5 ft 8 1/2 in)	Right	19 February 2023	(Brazilian Football Confederation) Internacional	€1.6M	30 June 2029	111	21	16	
12	Rwan Cruz	(Brazilian Football Confederation) (Bulgarian Football Union)	CF / AM	20 May 2001 (aged 24)	1.87 m (6 ft 1 1/2 in)	Right	16 January 2026	(Brazilian Football Confederation) Botafogo (loan)	—N/a	31 December 2026	84	30	13	
29	Yves Erick Bile	(Ivorian Football Federation) (Royal Belgian Football Association)	CF	24 December 2004 (aged 21)	1.81 m (5 ft 11 1/2 in)	Right	31 January 2025	(Football Association of Slovenia) Žilina	€700K	30 June 2028	17	2	0	
37	Bernard Tekpetey	(Ghana Football Association) (Bulgarian Football Union)	RW	3 September 1997 (aged 28)	1.72 m (5 ft 7 1/2 in)	Right	1 July 2021	(German Football Association) Schalke 04	€900K	30 June 2028	178	42	35	
73	Filip Gigov (HG, CT)	(Bulgarian Football Union)	CF	29 March 2007 (aged 18)	1.85 m (6 ft 1 in)	Right	1 July 2024	(Bulgarian Football Union) Ludogorets Academy		30 June 2026	4	0	0	
77	Erick Marcus (NE)	(Brazilian Football Confederation)	RW	1 March 2004 (aged 21)	1.77 m (5 ft 9 1/2 in)	Right	1 July 2025	(Brazilian Football Confederation) Vasco da Gama	€1.1M	30 June 2028	39	9	5	
99	Stanislav Ivanov (AT)	(Bulgarian Football Union)	RW	16 April 1999 (aged 26)	1.77 m (5 ft 9 1/2 in)	Both	1 July 2025	(Bulgarian Football Union) Arda Kardzhali	€350K	30 June 2028	0	0	0	

Notes:

- Player (HG) – Player who meets the First League's homegrown player criteria.
- Player (NE) - Player who falls into the First League's non-EU nationality player quota.
- Player (CT) – Player who meets UEFA's "club-trained player" criteria.
- Player (AT) – Player who meets UEFA's "association-trained player" criteria.
- Player (B) – Player who meets UEFA's "List B" criteria.

=== Out on loan ===
Player	Nat.	Position(s)	Date of birth (age)	Height	Preferred foot	Signed		Transfer fee	Loan			Contract ends	Apps.	Goals	Assists	Ref.
Player	Nat.	Position(s)	Date of birth (age)	Height	Preferred foot	On	From	Transfer fee	To	Fee	Until	Contract ends	Apps.	Goals	Assists	Ref.
Noah Sonko Sundberg	(Gambia Football Federation) (Swedish Football Association)	CB	6 June 1996 (aged 29)	1.87 m (6 ft 1 1/2 in)	Right	26 July 2023	(Bulgarian Football Union) Levski	€750K	(Hellenic Football Federation) Aris	None (Note: Includes a buyout clause.)	30 June 2026	30 June 2027	36	2	2	
Todor Nedelev	(Bulgarian Football Union)	AM	7 February 1993 (aged 32)	1.76 m (5 ft 9 1/2 in)	Left	28 March 2023	(Bulgarian Football Union) Botev Plovdiv	€150K	(Bulgarian Football Union) Botev Plovdiv	Undisclosed	30 June 2026	30 June 2026	50	9	8	
Emerson Rodríguez	(Colombian Football Federation)	LW / RW	25 August 2000 (aged 25)	1.74 m (5 ft 8 1/2 in)	Right	25 January 2025	(United States Soccer Federation) Inter Miami	€1.45M	(Bulgarian Football Union) Botev Plovdiv	Undisclosed	30 June 2026	31 December 2027	20	2	4	

== Transfers and contracts ==
For recent transfers, see Transfers winter 2024–25, Transfers summer 2025 and Transfers winter 2025–26.

=== Summer 2025 ===
==== In ====
Date	Pos.	Player	From	Type	Fee	Ref.
1 July 2025 (Note: Activation of Erick Marcus' buyout clause announced on 4th May 2025, while actual transfer comes into effect at the start of the summer transfer window.)	FW	(Brazilian Football Confederation) Erick Marcus	(Brazilian Football Confederation) Vasco da Gama	Loan buyout clause	€1,100,000 (Note: For 80% of the player's transfer rights.)	
1 July 2025	FW	(Bulgarian Football Union) Stanislav Ivanov	(Bulgarian Football Union) Arda Kardzhali	Transfer	€350,000	
1 July 2025	MF	(Football Association of the Czech Republic) Filip Kaloč	(German Football Association) Kaiserslautern	Transfer	€2,800,000	
1 July 2025	DF	(Argentine Football Association) Franco Russo	(Mexican Football Federation) Querétaro	Loan return	—N/a	
1 July 2025	DF	(Royal Spanish Football Federation) Pipa	(Royal Spanish Football Federation) Burgos	Loan return	—N/a	—N/a
1 July 2025	DF	(Gambia Football Federation) Noah Sonko Sundberg	(Turkish Football Federation) Sivasspor	Loan return	—N/a	—N/a
1 July 2025	FW	(French Football Federation) Mounir Chouiar	(Swiss Football Association) Zürich	Loan return	—N/a	
8 July 2025	DF	(Swedish Football Association) Joel Andersson	(Danish Football Association) Midtjylland	Transfer	€710,000	
18 July 2025	MF	(Football Association of Serbia) Petar Stanić	(Football Association of Serbia) TSC	Transfer	€2,100,000	
30 July 2025	FW	(Brazilian Football Confederation) Matheus Machado	(Saudi Arabian Football Federation) Al Fateh	Loan transfer	Undisclosed (Note: Includes buyout clause.)	
2 August 2025	DF	(Israel Football Association) Idan Nachmias	(Israel Football Association) Maccabi Tel Aviv	Transfer	Free	
Total					€7,060,000	

==== Out ====
Date	Pos.	Player	To	Type	Fee	Ref.
1 July 2025	FW	(French Football Federation) Antoine Baroan	(Swiss Football Association) Winterthus	Loan return	—N/a	
1 July 2025	FW	(Bulgarian Football Union) Georgi Rusev	(Swiss Football Association) Sion	Loan return	—N/a	
1 July 2025	DF	(Israel Football Association) Denny Gropper	(Israel Football Association) Maccabi Tel Aviv	End of contract	Free	
1 July 2025	DF	(Argentine Football Association) Franco Russo	(Mexican Football Federation) Querétaro	Loan buyout clause	€1,000,000 (Note: Rental fee included.)	
8 July 2025	DF	(Norwegian Football Federation) Aslak Fonn Witry	(Norwegian Football Federation) Rosenborg	Transfer	€750,000	
10 July 2025	MF	(Bulgarian Football Union) Todor Nedelev	(Bulgarian Football Union) Botev Plovdiv	Loan transfer	Undisclosed	
11 July 2025	DF	(Brazilian Football Confederation) Pedro Henrique	(Jordan Football Association) Al-Hussein	Transfer	Undisclosed	
25 July 2025	DF	(Gambia Football Federation) Noah Sonko Sundberg	(Hellenic Football Federation) Aris	Loan transfer	None	
2 August 2025	MF	(Polish Football Association) Jakub Piotrowski	(Italian Football Federation) Udinese	Transfer	€3,000,000	
26 August 2025	FW	(French Football Federation) Mounir Chouiar	(Royal Moroccan Football Federation) Berkane	Transfer	Undisclosed (Note: Unknown percentage of future transfer to be paid out to Ludogorets.)	
Total					€4,750,000	

==== Rumours ====
===== In =====
Date	Pos.	Player	From	Type	Fee	Res.	Ref.
29 April 2025	FW	(Guinean Football Federation) Salifou Soumah	(Association of Football Federations of Azerbaijan) Zira	Transfer	Undisclosed	No	
30 May 2025	MF	(Bulgarian Football Union) Stanislav Shopov	(Bulgarian Football Union) CSKA Sofia	Transfer	Undisclosed	No	
30 May 2025	MF	(Colombian Football Federation) Marcelino Carreazo	(Bulgarian Football Union) CSKA Sofia	Transfer	Undisclosed	No	
9 June 2025	FW	(Bulgarian Football Union) Stanislav Ivanov	(Bulgarian Football Union) Arda Kardzhali	Transfer	Undislosed	Yes	
18 June 2025	MF	(Football Association of the Czech Republic) Filip Kaloč	(German Football Association) Kaiserslautern	Transfer	€2,800,000	Yes	
23 June 2025	MF	(Ghana Football Association) Musah Mohammed	(Turkish Football Federation) Bodrum	Transfer	Undisclosed	No	
23 June 2025	FW	(Portuguese Football Federation) Gonçalo Gregório	(Football Federation of Armenia) Noah	Transfer	Undisclosed	No	
1 July 2025	FW	(Chadian Football Federation) Marius Mouandilmadji	(Turkish Football Federation) Samsunspor	Transfer	€1,500,000 (Note: Ludogorets allegedly initially offered a €1,500,000 transfer fee, with another €500,000 in bonuses for 90% of the player's transfer rights.)	No	
7 July 2025	DF	(Swedish Football Association) Joel Andersson	(Danish Football Association) Midtjylland	Transfer	€710,000 (Note: Quoted as 8 million Swedish kroner or 5.35 million Danish kroner.)	Yes	
8 July 2025	FW	(Royal Spanish Football Federation) Ángel Rodado	(Polish Football Association) Wisła Kraków	Transfer	€1,500,000	No	
10 July 2025	DF	(Polish Football Association) Tymoteusz Puchacz	(German Football Association) Holstein Kiel	Transfer	Undisclosed	No	
11 July 2025	MF	(Royal Spanish Football Federation) Jawad El Jemili	(Bulgarian Football Union) Levski Sofia	Transfer	Undisclosed	No	
15 July 2025	GK	(Football Association of Bosnia and Herzegovina) Kenan Pirić	(Turkish Football Federation) Antalyaspor	End of contract	Free	No	
16 July 2025	MF	(Football Association of Serbia) Petar Stanić	(Football Association of Serbia) TSC	Transfer	€2,100,000	Yes	
29 July 2025	MF	(Algerian Football Federation) Akram Bouras	(Algerian Football Federation) Alger	Transfer	Undisclosed	No	
30 July 2025	FW	(Brazilian Football Confederation) André Henrique	(Brazilian Football Confederation) Grêmio	Loan transfer	€388,250 (Note: Quoted as 2.5 million Brazilian reals or around 750 thousand Bulgarian leva.)	No	
28 August 2025	DF	(Cape Verdean Football Federation) Jordan Semedo	(Bulgarian Football Union) Slavia	Transfer	Undisclosed	No	
29 August 2025	DF	(Brazilian Football Confederation) Lucyan Delgado	(Brazilian Football Confederation) Bahia	Transfer	Undisclosed	No	
3 September 2025	FW	(Brazilian Football Confederation) Tevis Gabriel	(Brazilian Football Confederation) Cruzeiro	Transfer	Undisclosed	No	

===== Out =====
Date	Pos.	Player	To	Type	Fee	Res.	Ref.
31 May 2025	DF	(Swedish Football Association) Edvin Kurtulus	(Italian Football Federation) Roma	Transfer	Undislosed	No	
17 June 2025	DF	(Gambia Football Federation) Noah Sonko Sundberg	(Turkish Football Federation) Göztepe	Transfer	Undisclosed	No	
20 June 2025	MF	(Polish Football Association) Jakub Piotrowski	(Turkish Football Federation) Göztepe	Transfer	Undisclosed	No	
20 June 2025	DF	(Norwegian Football Federation) Aslak Fonn Witry	(Norwegian Football Federation) Rosenborg	Transfer	€700,000 (Note: Quoted as 8 million kr.)	Yes	
27 June 2025	MF	(Bulgarian Football Union) Ivan Yordanov	(Bulgarian Football Union) CSKA Sofia	Transfer	€175,000–€350,000 (Note: €175,000 purportedly offered by CSKA, while €350,000 is listed as Ludogorets' minimum.)	No	
30 June 2025	MF	(Bulgarian Football Union) Todor Nedelev	(Bulgarian Football Union) Botev Plovdiv	Transfer	Undisclosed	Yes	
1 July 2025	GK	(German Football Association) Hendrik Bonmann	(German Football Association) Köln	Transfer	Undisclosed	No	
2 July 2025	GK	(German Football Association) Hendrik Bonmann	(German Football Association) Bayern Munich	Transfer	€500,000	No	
3 July 2025	MF	(Polish Football Association) Jakub Piotrowski	(Italian Football Federation) Udinese	Transfer	€3,000,000	Yes	
3 July 2025	MF	(Polish Football Association) Jakub Piotrowski	(Hellenic Football Federation) Panathinaikos	Transfer	Undisclosed	No	
3 July 2025	MF	(Guinean Football Federation) Aguibou Camara	(Turkish Football Federation) Beşiktaş	Transfer	Undisclosed	No	
3 July 2025	MF	(Guinean Football Federation) Aguibou Camara	(Turkish Football Federation) Samsunspor	Transfer	€4,000,000	No	
18 July 2025	DF	(Royal Spanish Football Federation) Pipa	(Cyprus Football Association) Apoel	Transfer	€650,000	No	
19 July 2025	DF	(Gambia Football Federation) Noah Sonko Sundberg	(Hellenic Football Federation) Aris	Transfer	€800,000 (Note: Of which, €220,000 to be paid to former club Levski.)	Yes	
21 August 2025	FW	(Brazilian Football Confederation) Erick Marcus	(Brazilian Football Confederation) Palmeiras	Transfer	Undisclosed	No	
26 August 2025	FW	(French Football Federation) Mounir Chouiar	(Royal Moroccan Football Federation) Berkane	Transfer	Undisclosed	Yes	
11 September 2025	FW	(Brazilian Football Confederation) Caio Vidal	(Turkish Football Federation) Beşiktaş	Transfer	€2,000,000	No	

=== Winter 2026 ===
==== In ====
Date	Pos.	Player	From	Type	Fee	Ref.
1 January 2026	FW	(Argentine Football Association) Matías Tissera	(Argentine Football Association) Huracán	Loan return	None (Note: €200,000 paid to Ludogorets for the loan, at its onset.)	
8 January 2026	DF	(Brazilian Football Confederation) Vinícius Nogueira	(Swedish Football Association) Halmstad	Transfer	€750,000	
16 January 2026	FW	(Brazilian Football Confederation) Rwan Cruz	(Brazilian Football Confederation) Botafogo	Loan	Undisclosed	
24 February 2026	FW	(Royal Spanish Football Federation) Alberto Salido	(Bulgarian Football Union) Beroe	Transfer	€1,000,000	
Total					€1,750,000	

==== Out ====
Date	Pos.	Player	To	Type	Fee	Ref.
28 January 2026	FW	(Colombian Football Federation) Emerson Rodríguez	(Bulgarian Football Union) Botev Plovdiv	Loan	Undisclosed	
2 March 2026	FW	(Argentine Football Association) Matías Tissera	(Argentine Football Association) Instituto	Transfer	Free	

==== Rumours ====
===== In =====
Date	Pos.	Player	From	Type	Fee	Res.	Ref.
29 October 2025	MF	(Brazilian Football Confederation) Rodrigo Nestor	(Brazilian Football Confederation) São Paulo	Transfer	Undisclosed	No	
10 December 2025	MF	(Bulgarian Football Union) Kristiyan Balov	(Bulgarian Football Union) Slavia	Transfer	Undisclosed	No	
27 December 2025	FW	(Football Association of Iceland) Stefán Ingi Sigurðarson	(Norwegian Football Federation) Sandefjord	Transfer	Undisclosed	No	
5 January 2026	DF	(South African Football Association) Samukele Kabini	(Norwegian Football Federation) Molde	Transfer	Undisclosed	No	
7 January 2026	DF	(Brazilian Football Confederation) Vinícius Nogueira	(Swedish Football Association) Halmstad	Transfer	Undisclosed	Yes	
7 January 2026	FW	(Brazilian Football Confederation) Rwan Cruz	(Brazilian Football Confederation) Botafogo	Loan transfer	Undisclosed	Yes	
8 January 2026	FW	(Algerian Football Federation) Lofti Boussouar	(Algerian Football Federation) Belouizdad	Transfer	Undisclosed	No	
9 January 2026	FW	(Football Association of Ireland) Armstrong Oko-Flex	(Bulgarian Football Union) Botev Plovdiv	Transfer	€350,000–€400,000	No	
12 January 2026	MF	(Norwegian Football Federation) Mathias Rasmussen	(Royal Belgian Football Association) Union Saint-Gilloise	Transfer	Undisclosed	No	
11 February 2026	MF	(Royal Spanish Football Federation) Joni Montiel	(Association of Football Federations of Azerbaijan) Qarabağ	Transfer	Undisclosed	No	
23 February 2026	FW	(Tunisian Football Federation) Amor Layouni	(Swedish Football Association) Häcken	Transfer	€375,000 (Note: Quoted as 4 million Swedish kronor.)	No	
4 March 2026	MF	(Football Association of Serbia) Njegoš Petrović	(Football Association of Serbia) Vojvodina	Transfer	€2,500,000 (Note: Quoted as 2.5 to 3 million euro and percentage from next transfer.)	?	
14 March 2026	MF	(Cameroonian Football Federation) James Eto'o	(Bulgarian Football Union) CSKA Sofia	Transfer	Undisclosed	No	
30 March 2026	DF	(Bulgarian Football Union) Fabian Nürnberger	(German Football Association) Darmstadt 98	Transfer	Undisclosed	?	
1 April 2026	MF	(Brazilian Football Confederation) Lucas Evangelista	(Brazilian Football Confederation) Palmeiras	Transfer	Undisclosed	?	
6 April 2026	GK	(Swiss Football Association) Bojan Milosavljević	(Bulgarian Football Union) Lokomotiv Plovdiv	Transfer	Undisclosed	?	
12 May 2026	FW	(Bulgarian Football Union) Filip Krastev	(Royal Belgian Football Association) Lommel	Transfer	Undisclosed	No	
18 May 2026	FW	(Bulgarian Football Union) Berk Beyhan	(Bulgarian Football Union) Cherno More	Transfer	Undisclosed	?	
30 May 2026	FW	(Football Association of Serbia) Petar Sukačev	(Football Association of Serbia) Vojvodina	Transfer	€2,200,000 (Note: Including undisclosed percentage of future transfer fee.)	?	
3 June 2026	FW	(Royal Dutch Football Association) Emmanuel Poku	(Royal Dutch Football Association) Almere City	Undisclosed	Undisclosed	No	

===== Out =====
Date	Pos.	Player	To	Type	Fee	Res.	Ref.
28 September 2025	FW	(Ivorian Football Federation) Yves Erick Bile	(Royal Belgian Football Association) Anderlecht	Transfer	Undisclosed	No	
2 December 2025	FW	(Colombian Football Federation) Emerson Rodríguez	(Colombian Football Federation) Deportivo Cali	Undisclosed	Undisclosed	No	
15 December 2025	MF	(Football Association of Serbia) Petar Stanić	(Royal Spanish Football Federation) Real Betis	Undisclosed	Undisclosed	No	
30 December 2025	MF	(Guinean Football Federation) Aguibou Camara	(Turkish Football Federation) Kocaelispor	Transfer	Undisclosed	No	
5 January 2026	MF	(Football Association of Serbia) Petar Stanić	(Royal Spanish Football Federation) Sevilla	Undisclosed	Undisclosed	No	
7 January 2026	GK	(German Football Association) Hendrik Bonmann	(German Football Association) Hamburger	Undisclosed	Undisclosed	No	
8 January 2026	FW	(Argentine Football Association) Matías Tissera	(Argentine Football Association) Sarmiento	Transfer	Undisclosed	No	
19 January 2026	FW	(Colombian Football Federation) Emerson Rodríguez	(Bulgarian Football Union) Botev Plovdiv	Loan transfer	Undisclosed	Yes	
24 January 2026	FW	(Colombian Football Federation) Emerson Rodríguez	(Turkish Football Federation) Sakaryaspor	Loan transfer	Undisclosed	No	
28 January 2026	FW	(Brazilian Football Confederation) Erick Marcus	(Brazilian Football Confederation) Vasco da Gama	Transfer	Undisclosed	No	
23 February 2026	FW	(Argentine Football Association) Matías Tissera	(Argentine Football Association) Instituto	Transfer	Undisclosed	Yes	
27 February 2026	MF	(Football Association of Serbia) Petar Stanić	(French Football Federation) Nice	Transfer	Undisclosed	No	
27 February 2026	MF	(Football Association of Serbia) Petar Stanić	(Swiss Football Association) Basel	Transfer	Undisclosed	No	
14 March 2026	FW	(Ghana Football Association) Bernard Tekpetey	(Hellenic Football Federation) AEK	Transfer	Undisclosed	?	
16 March 2026	MF	(Football Association of Serbia) Petar Stanić	(Italian Football Federation) Milan	Transfer	Undisclosed	?	
16 March 2026	MF	(Football Association of Serbia) Petar Stanić	(Italian Football Federation) Atalanta	Transfer	Undisclosed	?	
28 March 2026	FW	(Brazilian Football Confederation) Erick Marcus	(Royal Dutch Football Association) Feyenoord	Transfer	€8,000,000	?	
30 April 2026	MF	(Bulgarian Football Union) Ivaylo Chochev	(Bulgarian Football Union) CSKA Sofia	Transfer	Undisclosed	?	
30 April 2026	DF	(Portuguese Football Federation) Dinis Almeida	(Bulgarian Football Union) CSKA Sofia	Transfer	Free	?	
8 May 2026	MF	(Brazilian Football Confederation) Pedro Naressi	(Bulgarian Football Union) CSKA Sofia	Transfer	Free	?	
18 May 2026	FW	(Swiss Football Association) Kwadwo Duah	(Swiss Football Association) Basel	Transfer	Undisclosed	?	
19 May 2026	DF	(Swedish Football Association) Noah Sonko Sundberg	(Turkish Football Federation) Göztepe	Transfer	Undisclosed	?	
21 May 2026	MF	(Brazilian Football Confederation) Pedro Naressi	(Bulgarian Football Union) Levski	Transfer	Free	?	
22 May 2026	MF	(Brazilian Football Confederation) Pedro Naressi	(Football Association of Serbia) Crvena zvezda	Transfer	Free	?	
28 May 2026	MF	(Football Association of Serbia) Petar Stanić	(Royal Dutch Football Association) AZ Alkmaar	Transfer	€7,000,000	?	
2 June 2026	MF	(Football Association of Serbia) Petar Stanić	(Hellenic Football Federation) Olympiacos	Transfer	Undisclosed	?	

=== New contracts ===
Date	Pos.	Player	Contract until	Extended by	Ref.
First Team
18 November 2025	GK	(Royal Dutch Football Association) Sergio Padt	30 June 2027	1 year	
18 November 2025	FW	(Swiss Football Association) Kwadwo Duah	30 June 2028	2 years	
24 November 2025	FW	(Brazilian Football Confederation) Caio Vidal	30 June 2029	3 years	
28 November 2025	MF	(Bulgarian Football Union) Ivan Yordanov	Undisclosed	Undisclosed (1 year min.)	
28 November 2025	MF	(Bulgarian Football Union) Ivaylo Chochev	Undisclosed	Undisclosed (1 year min.)	
28 November 2025	FW	(Ghana Football Association) Bernard Tekpetey	30 June 2028	1 year	

== Kits ==
Supplier: Jako / Sponsor: Efbet / Back sponsor(s): Vivacom (upper), Huvepharma (lower) / Sleeve sponsor: Navibulgar

Football kits
Home colours	Away colours	Third colours

== Pre-season and friendlies ==
Win Draw Loss Fixtures

21 June 2025 Friendly	Ludogorets (Bulgarian Football Union)	1–2	(Football Association of the Czech Republic) Slavia Prague	Schörfling am Attersee, Austria
18:00 CEST (UTC+02:00)	Bile 49'	Report	Chytil 13', 27' (pen.)	Stadium: SK Kammer

25 June 2025 Friendly	Ludogorets (Bulgarian Football Union)	2–2	(Polish Football Association) Legia Warsaw	Waidring, Austria
18:00 CEST (UTC+02:00)	Piotrowski 30' (pen.); Marcus 96'	Report	Urbański 70'; Żewłakow 105'	Stadium: Arena Waidring; Attendance: 50

30 June 2025 Friendly	Ludogorets (Bulgarian Football Union)	0–0	(Danish Football Association) Copenhagen	Kufstein, Austria
18:00 CEST (UTC+02:00)		Report		Stadium: Arena Kufstein; Attendance: 50

1 July 2025 Friendly	Ludogorets (Bulgarian Football Union)	0–2	(Football Association of the Czech Republic) Hradec Králové	Wörgl, Austria
17:00 CEST (UTC+02:00)		Report	Petrášek 16'; Uhrinčať 58', (yellow card) 85'	Stadium: Wörgl Stadium; Attendance: 100

11 January 2026 Friendly	Ludogorets (Bulgarian Football Union)	3–2	(Hungarian Football Federation) Paksi	Belek, Turkey
17:00 TRT (UTC+03:00)	Marcus 15', 18'; Nedyalkov (yellow card) 40'; Machado 55'; Nikolov (yellow card) 78'	Report	Windecker 22' (pen.); Vécsei (yellow card) 26'; Tóth 59'

14 January 2026 Friendly	Ludogorets (Bulgarian Football Union)	2–2	(Polish Football Association) Raków	Belek, Turkey
16:00 TRT (UTC+03:00)	Tekpetey 79' (pen.); Ivanov 80'	Report	Brunes 5' (pen.); Bulat 41'

29 March 2026 Friendly	Ludogorets (Bulgarian Football Union)	3–2	(Romanian Football Federation) Farul Constanța	Razgrad, Bulgaria
14:00 EET (UTC+02:00)	Tekpetey 15'; Nogueira 52'; Marins 64' (o.g.); Marcus (yellow card) 90'	Report	Alibec 17'; Almeida 43' (o.g.)	Stadium: Huvepharma Arena, Razgrad

== Competitions ==
=== Overall record ===
Competition	First match	Last match	Starting round	Final position	Record							
Competition	First match	Last match	Starting round	Final position	Pld	W	D	L	GF	GA	GD	Win %
First League	19 July 2025	23 May 2026	Matchday 1	Third	37	19	11	7	61	25	+36	51.35
Bulgarian Cup	30 October 2025	29 April 2026	Round of 32	Semi-finals	5	3	1	1	8	5	+3	60.00
Bulgarian Supercup	3 February 2026		Final	Winners	1	1	0	0	1	0	+1	100.00
UEFA Champions League	9 July 2025	12 August 2025	First qualifying round	Third qualifying round	6	2	3	1	6	6	+0	33.33
UEFA Europa League	21 August 2025	26 February 2026	Play-off round	Knockout phase	12	5	1	6	19	21	−2	41.67
Total					61	30	16	15	95	57	+38	49.18

Source: Soccerway

=== First League ===
==== Regular stage ====
===== League table =====
Pos	Team	Pld	W	D	L	GF	GA	GD	Pts	Qualification
1	Levski Sofia	30	22	4	4	64	22	+42	70	Qualification for the Championship group
2	Ludogorets	30	17	9	4	57	20	+37	60	Qualification for the Championship group
3	CSKA 1948	30	18	5	7	50	31	+19	59	Qualification for the Championship group
4	CSKA Sofia	30	16	8	6	43	23	+20	56	Qualification for the Championship group
5	Lokomotiv Plovdiv	30	11	13	6	30	33	−3	46	Qualification for the Conference League group

Source: Soccerway, Bulgarian Football
Rules for classification: 1) Points; 2) Head-to-head points; 3) Head-to-head goal difference; 4) Head-to-head goals scored; 5) Head-to-head away goals scored (only if two teams); 6) Goal difference; 7) Goals scored; 8) Fairplay ranking; 9) Draw

===== Results summary =====
Overall								Home						Away					
Pld	W	D	L	GF	GA	GD	Pts	W	D	L	GF	GA	GD	W	D	L	GF	GA	GD
30	17	9	4	57	20	+37	60	9	5	1	27	8	+19	8	4	3	30	12	+18

Last updated: 15 April 2026.
Source: Bulgarian Football

===== Results by round =====
Round	1	2	3	4	5	7	8	9	10	11	12	13	14	15	16	17	18	19	6^{1}	20	21	22	23	24	25	26	27	28	29	30
Ground	H	A	H	A	H	H	A	A	H	A	H	A	A	H	A	H	A	H	A	A	H	A	H	H	A^{2}	H	A	H	H	A
Result	W	W	W	W	D	W	D	D	W	D	D	L	D	L	W	W	W	D	W	W	W	L	D	W	W	W	W	W	D	L
Position	2	2	2	1	1	1	2	3	3	3	3	4	4	5	4	3	3	3	3	3	2	2	2	2	2	2	2	2	2	2
Points	3	6	9	12	13	16	17	18	21	22	23	23	24	24	27	30	33	34	37	40	43	43	44	47	50	53	56	59	60	60
Coach	M	M	M	M	M	M	M	M	M	M	M	M	Z	Z	H	H	H	H	S	H	H	H	H	H	H	H	H	H	H	H

Updated to match(es) played on 15 April 2026. Source: Bulgarian Football
A = Away; H = Home; W = Win; D = Draw; L = Loss; P = Postponed
Notes:
- ^{1} Matchday 6 (v. Beroe) was moved forward due to Ludogorets' participation in the Europa League play-off round.
- ^{2} Matchday 25 (v. Montana) was played at Huvepharma Arena due to ongoing repairs at Stadion Ogosta.

===== Matches =====
The match schedule was announced on 13 June 2025. Matchday 6 (v. Beroe) was moved forward due to Ludogorets' participation in the Europa League play-off round.

Win Draw Loss Fixtures

19 July 2025 1	Ludogorets	5–0	Septemvri Sofia	Razgrad
20:00 EEST (UTC+03:00)	Marcus (yellow card) 5'; Chochev 9' (pen.); Bile 49'; Ivanov 55'; Duarte 77'; Verdon 90+2'	Report; Report	Serber (yellow card) 88'	Stadium: Huvepharma Arena, Razgrad; Attendance: 1,247; Referee: Georgi Davidov; Assistant referees: Daniel Nikov; Nikifor Velkov; Fourth official: Denislav Stalev; VAR: Vladimir Valkov; Assistant VAR: Kristiyan Kolev; Fifth official: Tsvetan Krastev; Man of the Match: Deroy Duarte

25 July 2025 2	Botev Vratsa	0–1	Ludogorets	Vratsa
20:30 EEST (UTC+03:00)	Smolenski (yellow card) 14'; Stoev (yellow card) 43'; Penchev (yellow card) 64'; Boukassi (yellow card) 79'; Naydenov (yellow card) 87'; Genov (yellow card) 89'	Report	Verdon (yellow card) 45+2'; Kurtulus (yellow card) 47'; Naressi (yellow card) 77'; Shishkov (yellow card) 90'; Antoan Stoyanov 90+3' (o.g.)	Stadium: Hristo Botev Stadium, Vratsa; Attendance: 450; Referee: Valentin Zhelezov; Assistant referees: Stanimir Ilkov; Martin Machev; Fourth official: Mihael Pavlov; VAR: Stanimir Trenchev; Assistant VAR: Dimitar Dimitrov; Man of the Match: Son

2 August 2025 3	Ludogorets	2–1	Dobrudzha	Razgrad
21:15 EEST (UTC+03:00)	Chochev 22' (pen.); Andersson 78'	Report	M. Angelov 3'; A. Angelov (yellow card) 48'; Mihaylov (yellow card) 66'	Stadium: Huvepharma Arena, Razgrad; Attendance: 1,787; Referee: Stoyan Arsov; Assistant referees: Martin Velev; Iliyan Kaparashev; Fourth official: Todor Kirov; VAR: Krasen Georgiev; Assistant VAR: Stanimir Todorov; Man of the Match: Ivaylo Chochev

9 August 2025 4	Slavia	0–3	Ludogorets	Sofia
21:15 EEST (UTC+03:00)	Stoev (yellow card) 27'	Report	Chochev 43'; Bile 55'; Stanić 83'	Stadium: Aleksandar Shalamanov Stadium, Sofia; Referee: Volen Chinkov; Assistant referees: Deniz Sokolov; Petar Mitrev; Fourth official: Lyuboslav Lyubomirov; VAR: Stanimir Trenchev; Assistant VAR: Ventsislav Mitrev; Man of the Match: Petar Stanić

17 August 2025 5	Ludogorets	0–0	Lokomotiv Sofia	Razgrad
19:00 EEST (UTC+03:00)		Report	Dembélé (yellow card) 79'; Daskalov (yellow card) 90+1'	Stadium: Huvepharma Arena, Razgrad; Attendance: 1,200; Referee: Georgi Kabakov; Assistant referees: Martin Margaritov; Stanimir Ilkov; Fourth official: Georgi Stoyanov; VAR: Valentin Zhelezov; Assistant VAR: Georgi Davidov; Man of the Match: Bozhidar Katsarov

31 August 2025 7	Ludogorets	2–1	Botev Plovdiv	Razgrad
21:30 EEST (UTC+03:00)	Kurtulus 22'; Chochev 49'	Report	Emmanuel (yellow card) 1'; Yordanov (yellow card) 32'; Minkov 43'; Jocú (yellow card) 66'; Iliev (yellow card) 77'	Stadium: Huvepharma Arena, Razgrad; Attendance: 650; Referee: Vasil Minev; Assistant referees: Georgi Todorov; Svetoslav Stoychev; Fourth official: Mariyan Grebencharski; VAR: Stanimir Trenchev; Assistant VAR: Ventsislav Mitrev; Man of the Match: Ivaylo Chochev

14 September 2025 8	Lokomotiv Plovdiv	1–1	Ludogorets	Plovdiv
18:00 EEST (UTC+03:00)	Itu 6'; Cova (yellow card) 22'; Ryan (yellow card) 33'; Ivanov (red card) 44'; Atanasov (yellow card) 90+1'; Milosavljević (yellow card) 90+12'	Report	Vidal (yellow card) 31'; Stanić 90+5'; Kurtulus (yellow card) 90+12'	Stadium: Lokomotiv Stadium, Plovdiv; Attendance: 3,700; Referee: Georgi Davidov; Assistant referees: Nikifor Velkov; Milen Arabadzhiev; Fourth official: Vasil Minev; VAR: Nikola Popov; Assistant VAR: Georgi Ginchev; Man of the Match: Dimitar Iliev

19 September 2025 9	Levski	0–0	Ludogorets	Sofia
20:30 EEST (UTC+03:00)	Kostadinov (yellow card) 45+2'; Maicon (yellow card) 70'; Petkov (yellow card) 80'	Report	Kurtulus (yellow card) 16'; Kaloč (yellow card) 43'; Naressi (yellow card) 45+2'; Marcus (yellow card) 71'; Mota (yellow card) 83'; Stanić (yellow card) 88'	Stadium: Georgi Asparuhov Stadium, Sofia; Attendance: 15,000; Referee: Radoslav Gidzhenov; Assistant referees: Miroslav Ivanov; Georgi Doynov; Fourth official: Mariyan Grebencharski; VAR: Ventsislav Mitrev; Assistant VAR: Vladimir Valkov; Man of the Match: Sergio Padt

28 September 2025 10	Ludogorets	3–0	Montana	Razgrad
20:00 EEST (UTC+03:00)	Chochev 28'; Verdon 53'; Tekpetey 63'	Report	Sakor (yellow card) 22' (yellow-red card) 45'	Stadium: Huvepharma Arena, Razgrad; Attendance: 550; Referee: Georgi Stoyanov; Assistant referees: Yordan Petrov; Zhelyazko Pilatov; Fourth official: Kristiyan Kolev; VAR: Vladimir Valkov; Assistant VAR: Georgi Davidov; Man of the Match: Ivaylo Chochev

5 October 2025 11	CSKA Sofia	0–0	Ludogorets	Sofia
20:15 EEST (UTC+03:00)	Jordão (yellow card) 18' (yellow-red card) 78'; Martino (yellow card) 45+15'; Seger (yellow card) 59'; Lapeña (yellow card) 63'; Lapoukhov (yellow card) 90+6'	Report	Nachmias (yellow card) 13'; Nedyalkov (yellow card) 45+15'	Stadium: Vasil Levski National Stadium, Sofia; Attendance: 5,800; Referee: Dragomir Draganov; Assistant referees: Georgi Todorov; Dimo Valchev; Fourth official: Mariyan Grebencharski; VAR: Stanimir Trenchev; Assistant VAR: Martin Velikov; Man of the Match: Lapoukhov

18 October 2025 12	Ludogorets	1–1	Spartak Varna	Razgrad
17:30 EEST (UTC+03:00)	Tekpetey (yellow card) 40'; Stanić 50'	Report	Xandy 27'; Yordanov (yellow card) 66'; Kovalyov (yellow card) 85'; Halachev (yellow card) 90'	Stadium: Huvepharma Arena, Razgrad; Attendance: 2,011; Referee: Lyuboslav Lyubomirov; Assistant referees: Georgi Minev; Dragomir Milev; Fourth official: Lyubomir Vushovski; VAR: Georgi Davidov; Assistant VAR: Todor Kirov; Man of the Match: Xandy

27 October 2025 13	CSKA 1948	5–4	Ludogorets	Bistritsa
17:30 EET (UTC+02:00)	Diallo 3', (yellow card) 80'; Franco 16'; Sobrero 40'; Hoffmann (yellow card) 42'; Verdon 52' (o.g.); Tsonev 71'; Martines (yellow card) 87'	Report	Tekpetey 10', (yellow card) 29'; Hoffmann 81' (o.g.); Verdon (yellow card) 87'; Chochev 90', 90+8'	Stadium: Bistritsa Stadium, Bistritsa; Attendance: 220; Referee: Mariyan Grebencharski; Assistant referees: Miroslav Ivanov; Todor Vukov; Fourth official: Dimitar Dimitrov; VAR: Vasil Minev; Assistant VAR: Ventsislav Mitrev; Man of the Match: Brian Sobrero

2 November 2025 14	Cherno More	0–0	Ludogorets	Varna
17:45 EET (UTC+02:00)	Panayotov (yellow card) 48'; Martín (yellow card) 75'; Cardoso (yellow card) 78'	Report	Rodríguez (yellow card) 78'; Almeida (yellow card) 85'	Stadium: Ticha Stadium, Varna; Attendance: 3,500; Referee: Ventsislav Mitrev; Assistant referees: Martin Venev; Petar Mitrev; Fourth official: Gero Piskov; VAR: Stoyan Arsov; Assistant VAR: Lyuboslav Lyubomirov; Man of the Match: Kristian Tomov

9 November 2025 15	Ludogorets	2–3	Arda	Razgrad
17:30 EET (UTC+02:00)	Chochev 27'; Rodríguez 73'	Report	Popov 12'; Idowu (yellow card) 22'; Karageren 45+2'; Carscardo (yellow card) 46'; Eboa Eboa (yellow card) 62'; Shinyashiki 86'	Stadium: Huvepharma Arena, Razgrad; Attendance: 500; Referee: Volen Chinkov; Assistant referees: Deniz Sokolov; Ivo Kolev; Fourth official: Georgi Spasov; VAR: Dragomir Draganov; Assistant VAR: Kristiyan Todorov; Man of the Match: Andre Shinyashiki

23 November 2025 16	Septemvri Sofia	0–2	Ludogorets	Sofia
14:30 EET (UTC+02:00)	Hristov (yellow card) 47'; Fourrier (yellow card) 61'; Schouten (yellow card) 90'; Aruna (yellow card) 90+4'	Report	Almeida 25'; Nachmias (yellow card) 35'; Chochev 67'	Stadium: Lokomotiv Stadium, Sofia; Attendance: 250; Referee: Krasen Georgiev; Assistant referees: Hristo Hadzhiyski; Krasimir Atanasov; Fourth official: Todor Kirov; VAR: Nikola Popov; Assistant VAR: Dimitar Dimitrov; Man of the Match: Ivaylo Chochev

30 November 2025 17	Ludogorets	2–0	Botev Vratsa	Razgrad
15:00 EET (UTC+02:00)	Chochev 27'; Almeida (yellow card) 33'; Duah 71'; Kaloč (yellow card) 90+3'	Report	Stoev (yellow card) 33'	Stadium: Huvepharma Arena, Razgrad; Attendance: 380; Referee: Georgi Kabakov; Assistant referees: Martin Margaritov; Ivan Kopchev; Fourth official: Stanimir Todorov; VAR: Georgi Davidov; Assistant VAR: Mihael Pavlov; Man of the Match: Kwadwo Duah

4 December 2025 18	Dobrudzha	0–2	Ludogorets	Dobrich
13:00 EET (UTC+02:00)	Fall (yellow card) 3'; Cardoso (yellow card) 28'; Lovrić (yellow card) 68'	Report	Nedyalkov (yellow card) 30'; Vidal 45+2', 72'; Bile (yellow card) 45+4'; Chochev (yellow card) 51'	Stadium: Druzhba Stadium, Dobrich; Attendance: 1,100; Referee: Kristiyan Kolev; Assistant referees: Georgi Doynov; Stanimir Trifonov; Fourth official: Georgi Stoyanov; VAR: Stoyan Arsov; Assistant VAR: Ivaylo Nenkov; Man of the Match: Caio Vidal

8 December 2025 19	Ludogorets	1–1	Slavia	Razgrad
17:30 EET (UTC+02:00)	Nachmias (yellow card) 43'; Chochev 64'; Son (yellow card) 90'	Report	Solet 1', (yellow card) 4'; Marin (yellow card) 10'; Stefanov (yellow card) 90+3'; Miletić (yellow card) 90+4'	Stadium: Huvepharma Arena, Razgrad; Attendance: 580; Referee: Georgi Ginchev; Assistant referees: Martin Machev; Iliyan Kaparashev; Fourth official: Georgi Davidov; VAR: Dimitar Dimitrov; Assistant VAR: Martin Markov; Man of the Match: Lévi Ntumba

19 December 2025 6	Beroe	0–4	Ludogorets	Stara Zagora
17:30 EET (UTC+02:00)	Salomoni (yellow card) 39'; Dual (yellow card) 39'; Milheirão (yellow card) 76'	Report	Naressi (yellow card) 21'; Stanić 44'; Duah 45+2', 53'; Vidal (yellow card) 50'; Tekpetey 88'	Stadium: Beroe Stadium, Stara Zagora; Attendance: 350; Referee: Mariyan Grebencharski; Assistant referees: Martin Venev; Todor Vukov; Fourth official: Gero Piskov; VAR: Ventsislav Mitrev; Assistant VAR: Vasil Minev; Man of the Match: Kwadwo Duah

7 February 2026 20	Lokomotiv Sofia	1–3	Ludogorets	Sofia
15:00 EET (UTC+02:00)	Delev 8'; Bidounga (red card)	Report	Chochev 46'; Stanić 59' (pen.); Cruz 84'	Stadium: Lokomotiv Stadium, Sofia; Attendance: 1,267; Referee: Dragomir Draganov; Assistant referees: Krasimir Atanasov; Svetoslav Stoychev; Fourth official: Denislav Stalev; VAR: Lyuboslav Lyubomirov; Assistant VAR: Ivaylo Nenkov; Man of the Match: Ivaylo Chochev

15 February 2026 21	Ludogorets	2–1	Beroe	Razgrad
14:30 EET (UTC+02:00)	Andersson (yellow card) 34'; Kaloč (yellow card) 49'; Duah 83'; Stanić 87'	Report	Brunelli (yellow card) 29'; Valens (yellow card) 43'; Salido 52'; Varela (yellow card) 82'	Stadium: Huvepharma Arena, Razgrad; Attendance: 700; Referee: Vasil Minev; Assistant referees: Todor Vukov; Kostadin Tanovchev; Fourth official: Georgi Stoyanov; VAR: Martin Markov; Assistant VAR: Denislav Stalev; Man of the Match: Caio Vidal

23 February 2026 22	Botev Plovdiv	2–1	Ludogorets	Plovdiv
18:00 EET (UTC+02:00)	Silva (yellow card) 29'; Minkov 48'; Kalu (yellow card) 51'; Iliev (yellow card) 58'; Soldo (red card) 82'; Balogiannis (yellow card) 89'; Conte (yellow card) 90'; Algarra 90+2'; Tsonov (yellow card) 90+6'	Report	Nedyalkov (yellow card) 35'; Almeida (yellow card) 68'; Nachmias 81'	Stadium: Hristo Botev Stadium, Plovdiv; Attendance: 1,500; Referee: Ventsislav Mitrev; Assistant referees: Petar Mitrev; Mario Danailov; Fourth official: Stoyan Arsov; VAR: Mariyan Grebencharski; Assistant VAR: Lyuboslav Lyubomirov; Man of the Match: Nikolay Minkov

2 March 2026 23	Ludogorets	1–1	Lokomotiv Plovdiv	Razgrad
18:00 EET (UTC+02:00)	Kaloč (yellow card) 38'; Marcus 86'	Report	Chorbadzhiyski (yellow card) 56'; Idriz 76'; Ryan (yellow card) 84'	Stadium: Huvepharma Arena, Razgrad; Attendance: 800; Referee: Mariyan Grebencharski; Assistant referees: Georgi Todorov; Martin Machev; Fourth official: Todor Kirov; VAR: Martin Markov; Assistant VAR: Georgi Davidov; Man of the Match: Martin Ruskov

5 March 2026 24	Ludogorets	1–0	Levski	Razgrad
18:30 EET (UTC+02:00)	Duarte (yellow card) 32'; Nedyalkov (yellow card) 42'; Duah (yellow card) 70'; Marcus 80', (yellow card) 90+2'; Almeida (yellow card) 80'	Report	Trdin (yellow card) 32'; Aldair (yellow card) 35'; Bouras (yellow card) 42'; Kamdem (yellow card) 68'; Perea (red card)	Stadium: Huvepharma Arena, Razgrad; Attendance: 4,800; Referee: Vasil Minev; Assistant referees: Todor Vukov; Darin Ivanov; Fourth official: Georgi Stoyanov; VAR: Kristiyan Kolev; Assistant VAR: Lyuboslav Lyubomirov; Man of the Match: Erick Marcus

9 March 2026 25	Montana	0–3	Ludogorets	Razgrad
15:30 EET (UTC+02:00)		Report	Verdon 18'; Duah 43'; Chochev 45+2'	Stadium: Huvepharma Arena, Razgrad; Referee: Georgi Stoyanov; Assistant referees: Svetoslav Enchev; Milen Arabadzhiev; Fourth official: Todor Kirov; VAR: Georgi Davidov; Assistant VAR: Mihael Pavlov; Man of the Match: Kwadwo Duah

14 March 2026 26	Ludogorets	3–0	CSKA Sofia	Razgrad
17:45 EET (UTC+02:00)	Verdon (yellow card) 19'; Kaloč (yellow card) 28'; Duah 31'; Stanić 42'; Cruz 71' (pen.), (yellow card) 80'; Duarte (yellow card) 79'; Almeida (yellow card) 90+1'	Report	Piedrahita (yellow card) 79'; Eto'o (yellow card) 80'	Stadium: Huvepharma Arena, Razgrad; Referee: Lyuboslav Lyubomirov; Assistant referees: Martin Venev; Georgi Todorov; Fourth official: Gero Piskov; VAR: Stoyan Arsov; Assistant VAR: Todor Kirov; Man of the Match: Petar Stanić

19 March 2026 27	Spartak Varna	1–5	Ludogorets	Varna
18:00 EET (UTC+02:00)	Victor (red card); Georgiev 83'	Report	Chochev 29', 50'; Kurtulus (yellow card) 39' (yellow-red card) 57'; Duah 48'; Marcus 53'; Bile 90+1' (pen.)	Stadium: Spartak Stadium, Varna; Referee: Kristiyan Kolev; Assistant referees: Yordan Petrov; Stanimir Trifonov; Fourth official: Todor Kirov; VAR: Mariyan Grebencharski; Assistant VAR: Ivaylo Nenkov; Man of the Match: Ivaylo Chochev

5 April 2026 28	Ludogorets	3–0	CSKA 1948	Razgrad
19:30 EET (UTC+02:00)	Duah 45' (pen.); Chochev 55'; Naressi (yellow card) 63'; Stanić 83'	Report	Vitanov (yellow card) 33'; Diallo (yellow card) 49'	Stadium: Huvepharma Arena, Razgrad; Referee: Stoyan Arsov; Assistant referees: Todor Vukov; Darin Ivanov; Fourth official: Mihael Pavlov; VAR: Ventsislav Mitrev; Assistant VAR: Ivaylo Nenkov; Man of the Match: Ivaylo Chochev

9 April 2026 29	Ludogorets	0–0	Cherno More	Razgrad
18:00 EET (UTC+02:00)	Verdon (yellow card) 90'	Report	Stefanov (yellow card) 41'; Panayotov (yellow card) 63'; Tomov (yellow card) 90+2'	Stadium: Huvepharma Arena, Razgrad; Referee: Georgi Kabakov; Assistant referees: Martin Margaritov; Ivan Kopchev; Fourth official: Georgi Ginchev; VAR: Kristiyan Kolev; Assistant VAR: Yordan Petrov; Man of the Match: Kristian Tomov

15 April 2026 30	Arda	1–0	Ludogorets	Kardzhali
20:30 EET (UTC+02:00)	Velkovski 4'; Cascardo (yellow card) 62'	Report	Nedyalkov (yellow card) 11'; Duarte (yellow card) 44'; Stanić (yellow card) 66'; Naressi (yellow card) 75'; Marcus (yellow card) 90+3'	Stadium: Arena Arda, Kardzhali; Referee: Ventsislav Mitrev; Assistant referees: Martin Venev; Mario Danailov; Fourth official: Todor Kirov; VAR: Volen Chinkov; Assistant VAR: Georgi Stoyanov; Man of the Match: Dimitar Velkovski

==== Championship Group ====
===== League table =====
Pos	Team	Pld	W	D	L	GF	GA	GD	Pts	Qualification
1	Levski Sofia (C)	36	25	6	5	71	25	+46	81	Qualification for the Champions League first qualifying round
2	CSKA 1948	36	20	7	9	54	35	+19	67 (Note: Head to head points: CSKA 1948 9, Ludogorets Razgrad 3.)	Qualification for the Conference League second qualifying round
3	Ludogorets (O)	36	19	10	7	61	25	+36	67	Qualification for the Conference League play-off
4	CSKA Sofia	36	18	9	9	47	30	+17	63	Qualification for the Europa League first qualifying round (Note: The winners of the 2025–26 Bulgarian Cup (CSKA Sofia) qualified for the Europa League first qualifying round.)

Source: soccerway, Bulgarian Football
Rules for classification: 1) Points; 2) Points in regular season and second phase; 3) Head-to-head points in regular season and second phase; 4) Head-to-head goal difference in regular season and second phase; 5) Head-to-head goals scored in regular season and second phase; 6) Head-to-head away goals scored in regular season and second phase (if two teams tied); 7) Goal difference; 8) Goals scored; 9) Fair play ranking; 10) Drawing of lots.
(C) Champions; (O) Play-off winners

===== Results summary =====
Overall								Home						Away					
Pld	W	D	L	GF	GA	GD	Pts	W	D	L	GF	GA	GD	W	D	L	GF	GA	GD
6	2	1	3	4	5	−1	7	1	1	1	3	3	0	1	0	2	1	2	−1

Source: Bulgarian Football

===== Results by round =====
Round	1	2	3	4	5	6
Ground	H	A	A	H	A	H
Result	L	L	W	D	L	W
Position	3	3	2	2	3	3
Points	60	60	63	64	64	67
Coach	H	H	H	H	H	S

Source: Bulgarian Football
A = Away; H = Home; W = Win; D = Draw; L = Loss; P = Postponed

===== Matches =====
25 April 2026 31	Ludogorets	1–2	CSKA 1948	Razgrad
19:00 EET (UTC+03:00)	Marcus 18'; Nogueira (yellow card) 49'	Report	Sobrero 8'; Diallo 26'; Krebs (yellow card) 49'; Tsonev (yellow card) 62'; Grivić (yellow card) 75'; Iliev (yellow card) 90+4'	Stadium: Huvepharma Arena, Razgrad; Referee: Todor Kirov; Assistant referees: Krasimir Atanasov; Zhivko Petrov; Fourth official: Lyuboslav Lyubomirov; VAR: Ivaylo Nenkov; Assistant VAR: Gero Piskov; Man of the Match: Borislav Tsonev

3 May 2026 32	CSKA Sofia	1–0	Ludogorets	Sofia
19:00 EET (UTC+03:00)	Brahimi 11'; Jordão (yellow card) 56'; Piedrahita (yellow card) 66'; Martino (yellow card) 77'; Rodríguez (yellow card) 86'	Report	Tekpetey (yellow card) 23'; Marcus (yellow card) 61'; Bonmann (yellow card) 79'; Nedyalkov (yellow card) 90+1'	Stadium: Vasil Levski National Stadium, Sofia; Referee: Mariyan Grebencharski; Assistant referees: Georgi Todorov; Krasimir Milanov; Fourth official: Denislav Stalev; VAR: Lyuboslav Lyubomirov; Assistant VAR: Mihael Pavlov; Man of the Match: Mohamed Brahimi

9 May 2026 33	Levski	0–1	Ludogorets	Sofia
19:00 EET (UTC+03:00)	Dimitrov (yellow card) 44'; Bouras (yellow card) 49'; Lukov (yellow card) 90+5'	Report	Tekpetey (yellow card) 28'; Chochev (yellow card) 47'; Stanić 89'	Stadium: Georgi Asparuhov Stadium, Sofia; Referee: Ventsislav Mitrev; Assistant referees: Todor Vukov; Stanimir Trifonov; Fourth official: Stoyan Arsov; VAR: Todor Kirov; Assistant VAR: Georgi Stoyanov; Man of the Match: Petar Stanić

13 May 2026 34	Ludogorets	1–1	Levski	Razgrad
19:00 EET (UTC+03:00)	Nachmias (yellow card) 37'; Duarte 81'	Report	Trdin (yellow card) 29'; Mitkov (yellow card) 38'; Soula (yellow card) 65'; Perea 67'; Aldair (yellow card) 69'; Maicon (yellow card) 71'	Stadium: Huvepharma Arena, Razgrad; Referee: Lyuboslav Lyubomirov; Assistant referees: Hristo Hadzhiyski; Martin Machev; Fourth official: Georgi Stoyanov; VAR: Kristiyan Kolev; Assistant VAR: Denislav Stalev; Man of the Match: Juan Perea

16 May 2026 35	CSKA 1948	1–0	Ludogorets	Bistritsa
16:00 EET (UTC+03:00)	Tsonev (yellow card) 55'; Vitanov (yellow card) 72'; Iliev (yellow card) 81'; Dvali 90+6'	Report	Nedyalkov (yellow card) 3'; Kaloč (yellow card) 55'; Marcus (yellow card) 69'; Son (yellow card) 79' (yellow-red card) 90+4'; Chochev (yellow card) 90+5'; Naressi (yellow card) 90+8'	Stadium: Bistritsa Stadium, Bistritsa; Referee: Vasil Minev; Assistant referees: Martin Venev; Deniz Sokolov; Fourth official: Antonio Antov; VAR: Stoyan Arsov; Assistant VAR: Denislav Stalev; Man of the Match: Lasha Dvali

25 May 2026 36	Ludogorets	1–0	CSKA Sofia	Razgrad
19:00 EET (UTC+03:00)	Stanić (yellow card) 83'; Chochev 90+4'; Marcus (yellow card) 90+6'	Report	Rodríguez (yellow card) 72'	Stadium: Huvepharma Arena, Razgrad; Referee: Stoyan Arsov; Assistant referees: Darin Ivanov; Mario Danailov; Fourth official: Georgi Stoyanov; VAR: Vasil Minev; Assistant VAR: Denislav Stalev; Man of the Match: Ivaylo Chochev

==== Conference League play-off ====
29 May 2026	Ludogorets	0–0 (a.e.t.) (3–1 p)	Lokomotiv Plovdiv	Razgrad
19:00 EET (UTC+03:00)	Nogueira (yellow card) 63'	Report	Pavlov (yellow card) 60'; Kostov (yellow card) 66'; Chindriș (yellow card) 75'; Milosavljević (yellow card) 118'	Stadium: Huvepharma Arena, Razgrad; Referee: Lyuboslav Lyubomirov; Assistant referees: Georgi Doynov; Georgi Todorov; Fourth official: Mihael Pavlov; VAR: Mariyan Grebencharski; Assistant VAR: Gero Piskov; Man of the Match: Hendrik Bonmann
	Penalties
	Duah (penalty missed); Yordanov (penalty scored); Marcus (penalty scored); Cruz (penalty scored)		(penalty missed) Ali; (penalty missed) Ryan; (penalty scored) Chindriș; (penalty missed) Zwarts

=== Bulgarian Cup ===
==== Results summary ====
Overall								Home						Away					
Pld	W	D	L	GF	GA	GD	Pts	W	D	L	GF	GA	GD	W	D	L	GF	GA	GD
5	3	1	1	8	5	+3	10	1	0	1	2	2	0	2	1	0	6	3	+3

Source: Bulgarian Football

==== Matches ====
Win Draw Loss Fixtures

30 October 2025 Round of 32	Chernomorets 1919	2–3	Ludogorets	Nesebar
13:30 EET (UTC+02:00)	Staykov 8'; Wennisson (yellow card) 40'; Dramé 90+1'	Report; Report	Shishkov 19'; Yordanov (yellow card) 53', (goal) 60'; Chochev 90+4'	Stadium: Nesebar Stadium, Nesebar; Referee: Krasen Georgiev; Assistant referees: Svetoslav Stoychev; Teodor Petrov; Fourth official: Todor Kirov

15 December 2025 Round of 16	Septemvri	1–3	Ludogorets	Sofia
17:30 EET (UTC+02:00)	Stoichkov 77'	Report	Duah 7', 56'; Marcus 11', (yellow card) 83'	Stadium: Lokomotiv Stadium, Sofia; Referee: Stoyan Arsov; Assistant referees: Miroslav Ivanov; Darin Ivanov; Fourth official: Ventsislav Mitrev

11 February 2026 Quarter-finals	Ludogorets	1–0	Levski	Razgrad
18:00 EET (UTC+02:00)	Vidal 7', (yellow card) 71'; Naressi (yellow card) 63'; Nedyalkov (yellow card) 65'	Report	Kamdem (yellow card) 1'; Dimitrov (yellow card) 55'; Serafimov (yellow card) 60'; Bouras (yellow card) 77'	Stadium: Huvepharma Arena, Razgrad; Referee: Volen Chinkov; Assistant referees: Deniz Sokolov; Georgi Doynov; Fourth official: Georgi Davidov; VAR: Stoyan Arsov; Assistant VAR: Gero Piskov

21 April 2026 Semi-finals first leg	Ludogorets	1–2	CSKA Sofia	Razgrad
19:00 EET (UTC+03:00)	Duah 18'; Stanić (yellow card) 20'; Tekpetey (yellow card) 87'; Cruz (yellow card) 87'; Nogueira (yellow card) 90+4'; Verdon (yellow card) 90+7'	Report	Jordão (yellow card) 37' (yellow-red card) 90+6'; Eto'o (yellow card) 56'; Martino (yellow card) 59' (yellow-red card) 90+7'; Pittas 82', (yellow card) 90+3'; Godoy 84'; Evtimov (yellow card) 87'; Rodríguez (yellow card) 90'	Stadium: Huvepharma Arena, Razgrad; Referee: Kristiyan Kolev; Assistant referees: Hristo Hadzhiyski; Yordan Petrov; Fourth official: Georgi Stoyanov; VAR: Georgi Davidov; Assistant VAR: Todor Kirov

29 April 2026 Semi-finals second leg	CSKA Sofia	0–0 (2–1 agg.)	Ludogorets	Sofia
19:00 EET (UTC+03:00)	Eto'o (yellow card) 58'; Rodríguez (yellow card) 85'; Martino (yellow card) 90+1'; Lapoukhov (yellow card) 90+5'	Report	Chochev (yellow card) 37'; Duah (yellow card) 42'	Stadium: Vasil Levski National Stadium, Sofia; Referee: Gero Piskov; Assistant referees: Martin Venev; Ivo Kolev; Fourth official: Georgi Stoyanov; VAR: Vasil Minev; Assistant VAR: Kristiyan Kolev

=== Bulgarian Supercup ===
==== Match ====
3 February 2026 Final	Ludogorets	1–0	Levski	Sofia
18:00 EET (UTC+02:00)	Stanić (yellow card) 19'; Duarte (yellow card) 34'; Marcus (yellow card) 42'; Tekpetey 70'	Report	Maicon (yellow card) 44'; Kostadinov (yellow card) 50'; Makoun (yellow card) 82'; Lima (yellow card) 86'; Perea (yellow card) 90+1'	Stadium: Vasil Levski National Stadium, Sofia; Attendance: 14,000; Referee: Mariyan Grebencharski; Assistant referees: Martin Venev; Georgi Doynov; Fourth official: Lyuboslav Lyubomirov; VAR: Ventsislav Mitrev; Assistant VAR: Kristiyan Kolev

=== UEFA Champions League ===
==== Qualifying rounds ====
9 July 2025 First qualifying round first leg	Ludogorets (Bulgarian Football Union)	1–0	(Football Federation of Belarus) Dinamo Minsk	Razgrad, Bulgaria
20:30 EEST (UTC+03:00)	Kaloč 87'; Tekpetey (yellow card) 45+2'	Report; Report	Pigas (yellow card) 18'; Bakhar (yellow card) 32'; Myakish (yellow card) 70'; Djimet (yellow card) 76'	Stadium: Huvepharma Arena, Razgrad; Attendance: 4,522; Referee: Christian-Petru Ciochircă (Austria); Assistant referees: Michael Obritzberger (Austria); Stefan Pichler (Austria); VAR: Alan Kijas (Austria); Assistant VAR: Josef Spurny (Austria); Fourth official: Arnes Talic (Austria)

16 July 2025 First qualifying round second leg	Dinamo Minsk (Football Federation of Belarus)	2–2 (a.e.t.) (2–3 agg.)	(Bulgarian Football Union) Ludogorets	Mezőkövesd, Hungary
20:45 CEST (UTC+02:00)	Djimet 54'; Igor 62'; Podstrelov (yellow card) 65'; Begunov (yellow card) 112'; Demchenko (yellow card) 118'	Report; Report	Marcus 41', (yellow card) 97'; Mota (yellow card) 85'; Piotrowski (yellow card) 86'; Bile 100'; Verdon (yellow card) 106'	Stadium: Mezőkövesdi Városi Stadion, Mezőkövesd (Note: Due to the country's involvement in the Russian invasion of Ukraine, Belarusian teams were required to play their home matches at neutral venues and behind closed doors until further notice.); Attendance: 0 Referee: Goga Kikacheishvili (Georgia); Assistant referees: David Akhvlediani (Georgia); Davit Gabisonia (Georgia); VAR: Clay Ruperti (Netherlands); Assistant VAR: Bakur Ninua (Georgia); Fourth official: Irakli Kvirikashvili (Georgia)

22 July 2025 Second qualifying round first leg	Rijeka (Croatian Football Federation)	0–0	(Bulgarian Football Union) Ludogorets	Rijeka, Croatia
20:45 CEST (UTC+02:00)	Čagalj (yellow card) 22'; Đalović (yellow card) 36'; Oreč (yellow card) 38'; Devetak (yellow card) 42'	Report	Verdon (yellow card) 34'; Bile (yellow card) 36'; Kaloč (yellow card) 52'; Tekpetey (yellow card) 57'; Duarte (yellow card) 73'; Son (yellow card) 90'	Stadium: Stadion Rujevica, Rijeka; Attendance: 7,731; Referee: Elchin Masiyev (Azerbaijan); Assistant referees: Elshad Abdullayev (Azerbaijan); Parvin Talibov (Azerbaijan); VAR: Gianluca Aureliano (Italy); Assistant VAR: Aliyar Aghayev (Azerbaijan); Fourth official: Farid Hajiyev (Azerbaijan)

30 July 2025 Second qualifying round second leg	Ludogorets (Bulgarian Football Union)	3–1 (a.e.t.) (3–1 agg.)	(Croatian Football Federation) Rijeka	Razgrad, Bulgaria
20:30 EEST (UTC+03:00)	Piotrowski 19' (pen.); Son (yellow card) 50'; Verdon (yellow card) 90+1'; Chochev 107'; Ivanov 117'	Report; Report	Oreč (yellow card) 39'; Devetak (yellow card) 49'; Gojak 71'; Rukavina (red card) 77'; Fruk (red card) 90+9'; Lasickas (yellow card) 112'	Stadium: Huvepharma Arena, Razgrad; Attendance: 6,382; Referee: John Beaton (Scotland); Assistant referees: David McGeachie (Scotland); Graeme Stewart (Scotland); VAR: Steven McLean (Scotland); Assistant VAR: Kevin Clancy (Scotland); Fourth official: Calum Scott (Scotland)

6 August 2025 Third qualifying round first leg	Ludogorets (Bulgarian Football Union)	0–0	(Hungarian Football Federation) Ferencváros	Razgrad, Bulgaria
20:30 EEST (UTC+03:00)	Tekpetey (yellow card) 18'	Report	Ötvös (yellow card) 11'; O'Dowda (yellow card) 63'; Makreckis (yellow card) 71'	Stadium: Huvepharma Arena, Razgrad; Attendance: 6,746; Referee: Espen Eskås (Norway); Assistant referees: Jan Erik Engan (Norway); Anders Olav Dale (Norway); VAR: Dennis Higler (Netherlands); Assistant VAR: Mohammad Usman Aslam (Norway); Fourth official: Sigurd Kringstad (Norway)

12 August 2025 Third qualifying round second leg	Ferencváros (Hungarian Football Federation)	3–0 (3–0 agg.)	(Bulgarian Football Union) Ludogorets	Budapest, Hungary
20:15 CEST (UTC+02:00)	Varga 38', 79'; Ötvös (yellow card) 62'; Szalai 86'; Tóth (yellow card) 90'; Maïga (yellow card) 90+4'	Report	Kurtulus (yellow card) 45'; Kaloč (yellow card) 61'; Chouiar (yellow card) 70'; Nedyalkov (yellow card) 85'	Stadium: Ferencváros Stadion, Budapest; Attendance: 19,111; Referee: Alejandro Hernández Hernández (Spain); Assistant referees: José Naranjo (Spain); Marcos Cerdan Aguilar (Spain); VAR: Cesar Soto Grado (Spain); Assistant VAR: Daniel Trujillo Suárez (Spain); Fourth official: Alejandro Quintero González (Spain)

=== UEFA Europa League ===
==== Results summary ====
Overall								Home						Away					
Pld	W	D	L	GF	GA	GD	Pts	W	D	L	GF	GA	GD	W	D	L	GF	GA	GD
12	5	1	6	19	21	−2	16	4	1	1	13	9	+4	1	0	5	6	12	−6

Source: UEFA

==== Qualifying rounds ====
21 August 2025 Play-off round first leg	Shkëndija (Football Federation of Macedonia)	2–1	(Bulgarian Football Union) Ludogorets	Skopje, Northern Macedonia
20:00 CEST (UTC+02:00)	Latifi 35'; Zejnullai (yellow card) 39'; Ibraimi 60'; Webster (yellow card) 77'	Report	Duarte 17'; Naressi (yellow card) 72'	Stadium: Toše Proeski Arena, Skopje; Attendance: 3,720; Referee: Chris Kavanagh (England); Assistant referees: Dan Cook (England); Neil Davies (England); VAR: Michael Salisbury (England); Assistant VAR: Matthew Donohue (England); Fourth official: Thomas Bramall (England)

28 August 2025 Play-off round second leg	Ludogorets (Bulgarian Football Union)	4–1 (5–3 agg.)	(Football Federation of Macedonia) Shkëndija	Razgrad, Bulgaria
20:30 EEST (UTC+03:00)	Kurtulus 9'; Chochev 24'; Tekpetey 98'; Bile 120'	Report	Latifi (yellow card) 26'; Tamba 64'; Krasniqi (yellow card) 82'	Stadium: Huvepharma Arena, Razgrad; Attendance: 4,784; Referee: Urs Schnyder (Switzerland); Assistant referees: Marco Zürcher (Switzerland); Benjamin Zürcher (Switzerland); VAR: Lukas Fähndrich (Switzerland); Assistant VAR: Mirel Turkes (Switzerland); Fourth official: Sven Wolfensberger (Switzerland)

==== League phase ====
===== League table =====
Pos	Team	Pld	W	D	L	GF	GA	GD	Pts	Qualification
20	(Hellenic Football Federation) Panathinaikos	8	3	3	2	11	9	+2	12	Advance to knockout phase play-offs (unseeded)
21	(Scottish Football Association) Celtic	8	3	2	3	13	15	−2	11	Advance to knockout phase play-offs (unseeded)
22	(Bulgarian Football Union) Ludogorets Razgrad	8	3	1	4	12	15	−3	10	Advance to knockout phase play-offs (unseeded)
23	(Croatian Football Federation) Dinamo Zagreb	8	3	1	4	12	16	−4	10	Advance to knockout phase play-offs (unseeded)
24	(Norwegian Football Federation) Brann	8	2	3	3	9	11	−2	9	Advance to knockout phase play-offs (unseeded)

Source: UEFA
Rules for classification: League phase tiebreakers

===== Results by round =====
Round	1	2	3	4	5	6	7	8
Ground	A	H	A	A	H	H	A	H
Result	W	L	L	L	W	D	L	W
Position	4	21	26	30	25	23	25	22
Points	3	3	3	3	6	7	7	10

Source: UEFA
A = Away; H = Home; W = Win; D = Draw; L = Loss

===== Matches =====
24 September 2025 1	Malmö FF (Swedish Football Association)	1–2	(Bulgarian Football Union) Ludogorets	Malmö, Sweden
21:00 CEST (UTC+02:00)	Busanello (yellow card) 7'; Skogmar (yellow card) 43'; Christiansen (yellow card) 45+6'; Johnsen 78'	Report; Report	Stanić 8' (pen.); Bile 24'; Son (yellow card) 61'; Vidal (yellow card) 89'; Naressi (yellow card) 90+1'	Stadium: Eleda Stadion, Malmö; Attendance: 11,478; Referee: Manfredas Lukjančukas (Lithuania); Assistant referees: Mangirdas Mirauskas (Lithuania); Aleksandras Stepanovas (Lithuania); VAR: Stuart Attwell (England); Assistant VAR: Kevin Clancy (Scotland); Fourth official: Mindaugas Jackus (Lithuania)

2 October 2025 2	Ludogorets (Bulgarian Football Union)	0–2	(Royal Spanish Football Federation) Real Betis	Razgrad, Bulgaria
19:45 EEST (UTC+03:00)	Ivanov (yellow card) 88'	Report; Report	Ruibal (yellow card) 15'; Lo Celso 31'; Firpo (yellow card) 45+3'; Son 53' (o.g.); Rodriguez (yellow card) 80'	Stadium: Huvepharma Arena, Razgrad; Attendance: 5,844; Referee: Julian Weinberger (Austria); Assistant referees: Andreas Heidenreich (Austria); Maximilian Kolbitsch (Austria); VAR: Alan Kijas (Austria); Assistant VAR: Josef Spurny (Austria); Fourth official: Stefan Ebner (Austria)

23 October 2025 3	Young Boys (Swiss Football Association)	3–2	(Bulgarian Football Union) Ludogorets	Bern, Switzerland
21:00 CEST (UTC+02:00)	Raveloson 45'; Fassnacht 53', (yellow card) 90+5'; Bedia 63' (pen.); Tsimba (yellow card) 90+2'; Marzino (yellow card) 90+4'	Report; Report	Stanić 26'; Vidal (yellow card) 62'; Yordanov 90+2'	Stadium: Stadion Wankdorf, Bern; Attendance: 17,526; Referee: Mohammad Al-Emara (Finland); Assistant referees: Turkka Valjakka (Finland); Mika Lamppu (Finland); VAR: Benjamin Brand (Germany); Assistant VAR: Johann Pfeifer (Germany); Fourth official: Peiman Simani (Finland)

6 November 2025 4	Ferencváros (Hungarian Football Federation)	3–1	(Bulgarian Football Union) Ludogorets	Budapest, Hungary
21:00 CET (UTC+01:00)	Keïta (yellow card) 20'; Kanichowsky 32'; Yusuf (yellow card) 51'; Cadu 53'; Joseph 87'	Report; Report	Almeida (yellow card) 17'; Verdon (yellow card) 56'; Marcus (yellow card) 65'; Son 78'	Stadium: Ferencváros Stadion, Budapest; Attendance: 18,789; Referee: Mohammed Al-Hakim (Sweden); Assistant referees: Mehmet Culum (Sweden); Fredrik Klyver (Sweden); VAR: Pawel Malec (Poland); Assistant VAR: Kornel Paszkiewicz (Poland); Fourth official: Granit Maqedonci (Sweden)

27 November 2025 5	Ludogorets (Bulgarian Football Union)	3–2	(Royal Spanish Football Federation) Celta Vigo	Razgrad, Bulgaria
19:45 EET (UTC+02:00)	Stanić 11' (pen.), 49', 62' (pen.); Camara (yellow card) 53'; Bonmann (yellow card) 90+7'	Report; Report	Román (yellow card) 59'; Lago (yellow card) 64'; Durán 70'; Aspas (yellow card) 90+5'; El-Abdellaoui 90+6'	Stadium: Huvepharma Arena, Razgrad; Attendance: 4,779; Referee: Balázs Berke (Hungary); Assistant referees: Vencel Tóth (Hungary); Péter Kóbor (Hungary); VAR: Tamás Bognár (Hungary); Assistant VAR: Ferenc Karakó (Hungary); Fourth official: Bence Csonka (Hungary)

11 December 2025 6	Ludogorets (Bulgarian Football Union)	3–3	(Hellenic Football Federation) PAOK	Razgrad, Bulgaria
19:45 EET (UTC+02:00)	Stanić 33'; Verdon (yellow card) 47', (goal) 71'; Bile (yellow card) 53'; Chochev 77', (yellow card) 81'	Report; Report	Despodov 39'; Vogliacco 48'; Camara (yellow card) 69'; Mythou 90'	Stadium: Huvepharma Arena, Razgrad; Attendance: 6,433; Referee: Horațiu Feșnic (Romania); Assistant referees: Valentin Avram (Romania); Alexandru Cerei (Romania); VAR: Ovidiu Haţegan (Romania); Assistant VAR: Adrian Costreie (Romania); Fourth official: Rares Vidican (Romania)

22 January 2026 7	Rangers (Scottish Football Association)	1–0	(Bulgarian Football Union) Ludogorets	Glasgow, Scotland
20:00 GMT (UTC±00:00)	Diomande 33'; Chermiti (yellow card) 55'; Moore (yellow card) 62'; Fernandez (yellow card) 81'; Aarons (yellow card) 83'; Raskin (yellow card) 88'; Curtis (yellow card) 90+3'	Report; Report	Bonmann (yellow card) 90+3'	Stadium: Ibrox Stadium, Glasgow; Attendance: 37,105; Referee: Manfredas Lukjančukas (Lithuania); Assistant referees: Mangirdas Mirauskas (Lithuania); Aleksandras Stepanovas (Lithuania); VAR: Dennis Higler (Netherlands); Assistant VAR: Robert Schröder (Germany); Fourth official: Mindaugas Jackus (Lithuania)

29 January 2026 8	Ludogorets (Bulgarian Football Union)	1–0	(French Football Federation) Nice	Razgrad, Bulgaria
22:00 EET (UTC+02:00)	Almeida (yellow card) 24'; Stanić 42'	Report; Report	Mantsounga (yellow card) 87'; Boudache (yellow card) 90+4'	Stadium: Huvepharma Arena, Razgrad; Attendance: 4,792; Referee: Ondřej Berka (Czech Republic); Assistant referees: Kamil Hajek (Czech Republic); Matěj Vlček (Czech Republic); VAR: Tomas Kocourek (Czech Republic); Assistant VAR: Miroslav Zelinka (Czech Republic); Fourth official: Ondrej Pechanec (Czech Republic)

===== Knockout phase =====
19 February 2026 Play-off first leg	Ludogorets (Bulgarian Football Union)	2–1	(Hungarian Football Federation) Ferencváros	Razgrad, Bulgaria
22:00 EET (UTC+02:00)	Nogueira (yellow card) 4'; Duah 24'; Almeida (yellow card) 51'; Naressi (yellow card) 56'; Son 67'; Høgmo (yellow card) 80'	Report; Report	Yusuf 27'; Abu Fani (yellow card) 38'; Cadu (yellow card) 58'; O'Dowda (yellow card) 78'; Makreckis (yellow card) 83'	Stadium: Huvepharma Arena, Razgrad; Attendance: 3,145; Referee: Tobias Stieler (Germany); Assistant referees: Lasse Koslowski (Germany); Mark Borsch (Germany); VAR: Sören Storks (Germany); Assistant VAR: Johann Pfeifer (Germany); Fourth official: Matthias Jöllenbeck (Germany)

26 February 2026 Play-off second leg	Ferencváros (Hungarian Football Federation)	2–0 (3–2 agg.)	(Bulgarian Football Union) Ludogorets	Budapest, Hungary
18:45 CEST (UTC+01:00)	Kanichowsky (yellow card) 9', (goal) 14'; Zachariassen 31'; Raemaekers (yellow card) 51'; Gómez (yellow card) 75'; Gróf (yellow card) 80'; Joseph (yellow card) 90+3'	Report	Naressi (yellow card) 34'; Stanić (yellow card) 74'; Nedyalkov (yellow card) 81'; Tekpetey (yellow card) 90+4'	Stadium: Ferencváros Stadion, Budapest; Referee: Chris Kavanagh (England); Assistant referees: Dan Cook (England); Ian Hussin (England); VAR: Stuart Attwell (England); Assistant VAR: Peter Bankes (England); Fourth official: Darren England (England)

== Squad statistics ==
=== Appearances, goals and assists ===
No.	Pos.	Nat.	Player	First League			Bulgarian Cup			Bulgarian Supercup			Champions League			Europa League			Season total		
No.	Pos.	Nat.	Player	Apps.	Goals	Assists	Apps.	Goals	Assists	Apps.	Goals	Assists	Apps.	Goals	Assists	Apps.	Goals	Assists	Apps.	Goals	Assists
Goalkeepers
1	GK	(Royal Dutch Football Association)	Sergio Padt	11	0	0	1	0	0	1	0	0	2	0	0	5	0	0	20	0	0
39	GK	(German Football Association)	Hendrik Bonmann	26	0	0	3	0	0	0	0	0	4+1	0	0	7	0	0	41	0	0
67	GK	(Bulgarian Football Union)	Damyan Hristov	0	0	0	1	0	0	0	0	0	0	0	0	0	0	0	1	0	0
Defenders
2	DF	(Swedish Football Association)	Joel Andersson	14+4	1	2	1	0	0	0+1	0	0	0+3	0	0	2+4	0	0	27	1	2
3	DF	(Bulgarian Football Union)	Anton Nedyalkov	24+7	0	2	2+2	0	0	1	0	0	6	0	0	11	0	0	52	0	2
4	DF	(Portuguese Football Federation)	Dinis Almeida	22+1	1	1	4+1	0	0	0	0	0	2	0	0	11	0	1	40	1	2
5	DF	(Bulgarian Football Union)	Georgi Terziev	0+2	0	0	0	0	0	0	0	0	0	0	0	0	0	0	2	0	0
15	DF	(Swedish Football Association)	Edvin Kurtulus	9+3	1	1	0	0	0	1	0	0	6	0	2	3	1	0	22	2	3
17	DF	(Royal Spanish Football Federation)	Son	25+5	0	3	5	0	2	1	0	1	6	0	1	11+1	2	0	54	2	7
24	DF	(Benin Football Federation)	Olivier Verdon	21+1	3	0	4	0	0	1	0	0	4	0	0	8+2	1	1	40	4	1
27	DF	(Brazilian Football Confederation)	Vinícius Nogueira	11+5	0	1	1+2	0	0	0	0	0	0	0	0	1+1	0	0	21	0	1
42	DF	(Bulgarian Football Union)	Simeon Shishkov	4+2	0	0	1+1	1	0	0	0	0	0	0	0	0	0	0	8	1	0
55	DF	(Israel Football Association)	Idan Nachmias	18+4	1	0	1	0	0	0	0	0	0	0	0	2+1	0	0	26	1	0
Midfielders
14	MF	(Football Association of Serbia)	Petar Stanić	24+10	9	10	3+1	0	1	1	0	0	2+2	0	0	11+1	7	3	54	16	14
18	MF	(Bulgarian Football Union)	Ivaylo Chochev	30+7	17	5	2+3	1	0	0+1	0	0	1+3	1	0	1+11	2	0	58	21	5
20	MF	(Guinean Football Federation)	Aguibou Camara	0+1	0	0	0	0	0	0	0	0	1	0	0	1	0	0	3	0	0
23	MF	(Cape Verdean Football Federation)	Deroy Duarte	28+6	2	1	4+1	0	0	1	0	0	1+4	0	0	11	1	1	56	3	2
26	MF	(Football Association of the Czech Republic)	Filip Kaloč	19+12	0	0	2+3	0	0	0	0	0	5+1	1	0	4+5	0	1	50	1	1
30	MF	(Brazilian Football Confederation)	Pedro Naressi	22+5	0	1	4	0	0	1	0	0	3+2	0	0	10	0	1	46	0	2
80	MF	(Bulgarian Football Union)	Metodiy Stefanov	0+1	0	0	0+1	0	0	0	0	0	0	0	0	0	0	0	2	0	0
82	MF	(Bulgarian Football Union)	Ivan Yordanov	2+12	0	0	2	1	1	0	0	0	0	0	0	1+4	1	0	21	2	1
Forwards
7	FW	(Royal Spanish Football Federation)	Alberto Salido	0+11	0	0	1	0	0	0	0	0	0	0	0	0	0	0	12	0	0
9	FW	(Swiss Football Association)	Kwadwo Duah	12+7	8	1	4	3	0	1	0	0	0	0	0	2	1	0	25	12	1
10	FW	(Brazilian Football Confederation)	Matheus Machado	4+6	0	0	0+2	0	1	0	0	0	0	0	0	1+6	0	0	18	0	1
11	FW	(Brazilian Football Confederation)	Caio Vidal	17+1	2	4	1	1	0	1	0	0	6	0	0	11	0	1	37	3	5
12	FW	(Brazilian Football Confederation)	Rwan Cruz	4+6	2	0	1+2	0	0	0+1	0	0	0	0	0	0+2	0	0	16	2	0
29	FW	(Ivorian Football Federation)	Yves Erick Bile	13+8	3	1	1+3	0	0	0	0	0	2+4	1	0	6+4	2	0	40	6	1
37	FW	(Ghana Football Association)	Bernard Tekpetey	18+11	3	3	1+2	0	0	0+1	1	0	5+1	0	0	2+6	1	2	47	5	5
73	FW	(Bulgarian Football Union)	Filip Gigov	0+3	0	0	0	0	0	0	0	0	0	0	0	0	0	0	3	0	0
77	FW	(Brazilian Football Confederation)	Erick Marcus	20+12	4	5	2	1	1	1	0	0	6	1	0	8+3	0	1	51	6	7
99	FW	(Bulgarian Football Union)	Stanislav Ivanov	5+7	1	0	2	0	0	0	0	0	0+5	1	0	1+5	0	1	26	2	1
Transferred or loaned out during season
6	MF	(Polish Football Association)	Jakub Piotrowski	0	0	0	0	0	0	0	0	0	4	1	0	0	0	0	4	1	0
8	MF	(Bulgarian Football Union)	Todor Nedelev	0	0	0	0	0	0	0	0	0	0+1	0	0	0	0	0	1	0	0
8	FW	(French Football Federation)	Mounir Chouiar	4+1	0	1	0	0	0	0	0	0	0+4	0	1	1	0	0	10	0	2
25	FW	(Colombian Football Federation)	Emerson Rodríguez	0+7	1	2	1	0	0	0	0	0	0	0	0	0	0	0	8	1	2
Own goals				—N/a	2	—N/a	—N/a	—N/a	—N/a	—N/a	—N/a	—N/a	—N/a	—N/a	—N/a	—N/a	—N/a	—N/a	—N/a	2	—N/a
Totals				—N/a	61	44	—N/a	8	6	—N/a	1	1	—N/a	6	4	—N/a	19	13	—N/a	95	68

==== Hat-tricks ====
Includes all competitions for senior teams. Players with no hat-tricks not included in the list.

- Score – The score at the time of each goal. Ludogorets' score listed first.

Date	No.	Pos.	Player	Score	Final score	Opponent	Competition
27 Nov 2025	14	MF	(Football Association of Serbia) Petar Stanić	1–0, 2–0, 3–0	3–2 (H)	(Royal Spanish Football Federation) Celta	Europa League

=== Clean sheets ===
Clean sheets											Total apps.	Goals conceded
No.	Pos.	Nat.	Name	First League	Bulgarian Cup	Bulgarian Supercup	Champions League	Europa League	Total	Clean sheet %	Total apps.	Goals conceded
1	GK	(Royal Dutch Football Association)	Sergio Padt	5	0	1	1	0	7	36.8% (7/20)	20	21
39	GK	(German Football Association)	Hendrik Bonmann	15	2	0	2	1	20	48.8% (20/41)	41	34
67	GK	(Bulgarian Football Union)	Damyan Hristov	0	0	0	0	0	0	0.0% (0/1)	1	2
Totals				20	2	1	3	1	27	44.3% (27/61)	61 (Note: Lower due to one shared appearance.)	57

=== Disciplinary record ===
==== Cards ====
No.	Pos.	Nat.	Name	First League			Bulgarian Cup			Bulgarian Supercup			Champions League			Europa League			Total		
No.	Pos.	Nat.	Name	Yellow card	(yellow card) (yellow-red card)	Red card	Yellow card	(yellow card) (yellow-red card)	Red card	Yellow card	(yellow card) (yellow-red card)	Red card	Yellow card	(yellow card) (yellow-red card)	Red card	Yellow card	(yellow card) (yellow-red card)	Red card	Yellow card	(yellow card) (yellow-red card)	Red card
Goalkeepers
39	GK	(German Football Association)	Hendrik Bonmann	1	0	0	0	0	0	0	0	0	0	0	0	2	0	0	3	0	0
Defenders
2	DF	(Swedish Football Association)	Joel Andersson	1	0	0	0	0	0	0	0	0	0	0	0	0	0	0	1	0	0
3	DF	(Bulgarian Football Union)	Anton Nedyalkov	7	0	0	1	0	0	0	0	0	1	0	0	1	0	0	10	0	0
4	DF	(Portuguese Football Federation)	Dinis Almeida	5	0	0	0	0	0	0	0	0	0	0	0	3	0	0	8	0	0
15	DF	(Swedish Football Association)	Edvin Kurtulus	5	1	0	0	0	0	0	0	0	1	0	0	0	0	0	6	1	0
17	DF	(Royal Spanish Football Federation)	Son	3	1	0	0	0	0	0	0	0	2	0	0	1	0	0	5	0	0
24	DF	(Benin Football Federation)	Olivier Verdon	4	0	0	0	0	0	0	0	0	3	0	0	2	0	0	9	0	0
27	DF	(Brazilian Football Confederation)	Vinícius Nogueira	2	0	0	1	0	0	0	0	0	0	0	0	1	0	0	4	0	0
42	DF	(Bulgarian Football Union)	Simeon Shishkov	1	0	0	0	0	0	0	0	0	0	0	0	0	0	0	1	0	0
55	DF	(Israel Football Association)	Idan Nachmias	4	0	0	0	0	0	0	0	0	0	0	0	0	0	0	4	0	0
Midfielders
14	MF	(Football Association of Serbia)	Petar Stanić	3	0	0	1	0	0	1	0	0	0	0	0	1	0	0	6	0	0
18	MF	(Bulgarian Football Union)	Ivaylo Chochev	3	0	0	1	0	0	0	0	0	0	0	0	1	0	0	5	0	0
20	MF	(Guinean Football Federation)	Aguibou Camara	0	0	0	0	0	0	0	0	0	0	0	0	1	0	0	1	0	0
23	MF	(Cape Verdean Football Federation)	Deroy Duarte	3	0	0	0	0	0	1	0	0	1	0	0	0	0	0	5	0	0
26	MF	(Football Association of the Czech Republic)	Filip Kaloč	6	0	0	0	0	0	0	0	0	2	0	0	0	0	0	8	0	0
30	MF	(Brazilian Football Confederation)	Pedro Naressi	6	0	0	1	0	0	0	0	0	0	0	0	4	0	0	11	0	0
82	MF	(Bulgarian Football Union)	Ivan Yordanov	0	0	0	1	0	0	0	0	0	0	0	0	0	0	0	1	0	0
Forwards
9	FW	(Swiss Football Association)	Kwadwo Duah	1	0	0	1	0	0	0	0	0	0	0	0	0	0	0	2	0	0
11	FW	(Brazilian Football Confederation)	Caio Vidal	2	0	0	1	0	0	0	0	0	0	0	0	2	0	0	5	0	0
12	FW	(Brazilian Football Confederation)	Rwan Cruz	1	0	0	1	0	0	0	0	0	0	0	0	0	0	0	2	0	0
29	FW	(Ivorian Football Federation)	Yves Erick Bile	1	0	0	0	0	0	0	0	0	1	0	0	1	0	0	3	0	0
37	FW	(Ghana Football Association)	Bernard Tekpetey	4	0	0	1	0	0	0	0	0	3	0	0	1	0	0	9	0	0
77	FW	(Brazilian Football Confederation)	Erick Marcus	7	0	0	1	0	0	1	0	0	1	0	0	2	0	0	12	0	0
99	FW	(Bulgarian Football Union)	Stanislav Ivanov	0	0	0	0	0	0	0	0	0	0	0	0	1	0	0	1	0	0
Transferred or loaned out during season
6	MF	(Polish Football Association)	Jakub Piotrowski	0	0	0	0	0	0	0	0	0	1	0	0	0	0	0	1	0	0
8	FW	(French Football Federation)	Mounir Chouiar	0	0	0	0	0	0	0	0	0	1	0	0	0	0	0	1	0	0
25	FW	(Colombian Football Federation)	Emerson Rodríguez	1	0	0	0	0	0	0	0	0	0	0	0	0	0	0	1	0	0
Totals				71	2	0	11	0	0	3	0	0	17	0	0	24	0	0	126	2	0

==== Suspensions ====
Date	Pos.	Player	Match	Tournament	Reason	Duration	Ref.
30 July 2025	DF	(Benin Football Federation) Olivier Verdon	Ludogorets – Rijeka	Champions League	Accumulation of 3 yellow cards	1 match	
26 February 2026	DF	(Portuguese Football Federation) Dinis Almeida	Ferencváros – Ludogorets	Europa League	Accumulation of 3 yellow cards	1 match	
9 March 2026	DF	(Bulgarian Football Union) Anton Nedyalkov	Montana – Ludogorets	First League	Accumulation of 5 yellow cards	1 match	
19 March 2026	DF	(Portuguese Football Federation) Dinis Almeida	Spartak Varna – Ludogorets	First League	Accumulation of 5 yellow cards	1 match	
19 March 2026	MF	(Football Association of the Czech Republic) Filip Kaloč	Spartak Varna – Ludogorets	First League	Accumulation of 5 yellow cards	1 match	
5 April 2026	DF	(Swedish Football Association) Edvin Kurtulus	Ludogorets – CSKA 1948	First League	Red card suspension	1 match	
9 April 2026	MF	(Brazilian Football Confederation) Pedro Naressi	Ludogorets – Cherno More	First League	Accumulation of 5 yellow cards	1 match	
21 April 2026	FW	(Brazilian Football Confederation) Erick Marcus	Ludogorets – CSKA Sofia	Bulgarian Cup	Accumulation of 5 yellow cards	1 match	
13 May 2026	FW	(Ghana Football Association) Bernard Tekpetey	Ludogorets – Levski	First League	Accumulation of 5 yellow cards	1 match	
25 May 2026	DF	(Royal Spanish Football Federation) Son	Ludogorets – CSKA Sofia	First League	Red card suspension	1 match	

=== Injuries ===
Note: Date and Return should always be set as last match where player was called up, and first match after injury.

Date	Pos.	Player	Type	Return	Time	Ref.
7 April 2025	DF	(Bulgarian Football Union) Georgi Terziev	Anterior cruciate ligament rupture	1 February 2026	9 months and 25 days	
21 June 2025	FW	(Swiss Football Association) Kwadwo Duah	Undisclosed	23 November 2025	5 months and 2 days	
9 July 2025	MF	(Guinean Football Federation) Aguibou Camara	Muscle strain (right leg)	6 November 2025	3 months and 28 days	
28 September 2025	DF	(Swedish Football Association) Joel Andersson	Shoulder injury	18 October 2025	19 days	
2 October 2025	DF	(Swedish Football Association) Edvin Kurtulus	Kneecap luxation (right leg)	3 February 2026	4 months and 1 day	
18 October 2025	FW	(Brazilian Football Confederation) Erick Marcus	Undisclosed	6 November 2025	19 days	
2 November 2025	FW	(Ghana Football Association) Bernard Tekpetey	Cracked cheekbone	23 November 2025	21 days	
9 November 2025	GK	(Royal Dutch Football Association) Sergio Padt	Muscle strain	27 November 2025	18 days	
9 November 2025	FW	(Brazilian Football Confederation) Erick Marcus	Undisclosed	27 November 2025	18 days	
13 November 2025	FW	(Bulgarian Football Union) Stanislav Ivanov	Undisclosed	19 December 2025	1 month and 6 days	
2 November 2025	DF	(Swedish Football Association) Joel Andersson	Knee surgery	22 January 2026	2 months and 20 days	
27 November 2025	MF	(Guinean Football Federation) Aguibou Camara	Quadriceps tendon surgery (right leg)	4 months	—N/a	
7 February 2026	DF	(Swedish Football Association) Edvin Kurtulus	Undisclosed	9 March 2026	1 month and 2 days	
5 March 2025	FW	(Brazilian Football Confederation) Caio Vidal	Groin injury	Undisclosed	—N/a	
5 March 2025	FW	(Bulgarian Football Union) Stanislav Ivanov	Groin injury	Undisclosed	—N/a	
5 March 2025	MF	(Brazilian Football Confederation) Pedro Naressi	Cheekbone injury	19 March 2026	14 days	
14 March 2026	FW	(Brazilian Football Confederation) Rwan Cruz	Undisclosed	15 April 2026	1 month and 1 day	
19 March 2026	DF	(Benin Football Federation) Olivier Verdon	Undisclosed	5 April 2026	17 days	
15 April 2026	DF	(Swedish Football Association) Joel Andersson	Thigh injury	—N/a	—N/a	
25 April 2026	DF	(Swedish Football Association) Edvin Kurtulus	Muscle strain	25 May 2026	1 month	
29 April 2026	FW	(Brazilian Football Confederation) Rwan Cruz	Undisclosed	29 May 2026	1 month	
3 May 2026	DF	(Portuguese Football Federation) Dinis Almeida	Undisclosed	—N/a	—N/a	
3 May 2026	MF	(Brazilian Football Confederation) Pedro Naressi	Undisclosed	13 May 2025	10 days	
3 May 2026	FW	(Swiss Football Association) Kwadwo Duah	Undisclosed	16 May 2025	13 days	

=== Awards ===
==== Man of the match ====
Awarded through online polling on Gong.bg.

Rank	No.	Pos.	Nat.	Player	MOTM
1	18	MF	(Bulgarian Football Union)	Ivaylo Chochev	8
2	9	FW	(Swiss Football Association)	Kwadwo Duah	3
2	14	MF	(Football Association of Serbia)	Petar Stanić	3
4	11	FW	(Brazilian Football Confederation)	Caio Vidal	2
5	23	MF	(Cape Verdean Football Federation)	Deroy Duarte	1
5	77	FW	(Brazilian Football Confederation)	Erick Marcus	1
5	17	DF	(Royal Spanish Football Federation)	Son	1
5	1	GK	(Royal Dutch Football Association)	Sergio Padt	1
5	39	GK	(German Football Association)	Hendrik Bonmann	1
Total					21
