= Simeon Shishkov =

Bulgarian footballer

Personal information
- Full name: Simeon Dimitrov Shishkov
- Date of birth: 18 May 2006 (age 20)
- Place of birth: Haskovo, Bulgaria
- Height: 1.82 m (6 ft 0 in)
- Position: Defender

Team information
- Current team: Ludogorets Razgrad
- Number: 42

Youth career
- –2018: Haskovo 1957
- 2018–2024: Ludogorets Razgrad

Senior career*
Years	Team	Apps	(Gls)
2023–2024	Ludogorets III	12	(2)
2023–	Ludogorets II	83	(2)
2025–	Ludogorets Razgrad	17	(1)

International career^{‡}
2022–2023	Bulgaria U17	7	(3)
2026–	Bulgaria U21	3	(0)
2026–	Bulgaria	1	(0)
- * Club domestic league appearances and goals as of 07:20, 16 October 2026 (UTC) ‡ National team caps and goals as of 20:08, 16 November 2026 (UTC)

Simeon Shishkov (Bulgarian: Симеон Шишков; born 18 May 2006) is a Bulgarian professional footballer who plays as a defender for Ludogorets Razgrad and the Bulgaria national team.

== Club career ==
Born in Haskovo, Shishkov started his youth career in the local Haskovo 1957 team, before moving to Ludogorets Academy in 2018. In september 2024 he was included in the squad for the 2024–25 UEFA Europa League - League phase. He made his professional debut for the first team in a league match against Arda on 26 May 2025.

== International career ==
In 2022 he received his first called up for Bulgaria U17 team.

Shishkov made his debut for the Bulgaria national team on 14 November 2026 in a UEFA Nations League game against Estonia.

== Career statistics ==
=== Club ===
As of 9 September 2026

Club performance			League		Cup		Continental		Other		Total	
Club	League	Season	Apps	Goals	Apps	Goals	Apps	Goals	Apps	Goals	Apps	Goals
Bulgaria			League		Bulgarian Cup		Europe		Other		Total	
Ludogorets III	Third League	2023–24	12	2	–		–		–		12	2
Ludogorets II	Second League	2023–24	21	0	–		–		–		21	0
Ludogorets II	Second League	2024–25	35	0	–		–		–		35	0
Ludogorets II	Second League	2025–26	27	2	–		–		–		27	2
Ludogorets II	Total		83	2	0	0	0	0	0	0	83	2
Ludogorets Razgrad	First League	2024–25	1	0	0	0	0	0	0	0	1	0
Ludogorets Razgrad	First League	2025–26	6	0	2	1	0	0	0	0	8	1
Ludogorets Razgrad	First League	2026–27	8	0	0	0	1	0	0	0	9	0
Ludogorets Razgrad	Total		15	0	2	1	1	0	0	0	18	1
Career statistics			110	4	2	1	1	0	0	0	113	4
