= Filip Gigov =

Bulgarian footballer

Personal information
- Full name: Filip Lyubenov Gigov
- Date of birth: 29 March 2007 (age 19)
- Place of birth: Sofia, Bulgaria
- Height: 1.85 m (6 ft 1 in)
- Position: Forward

Team information
- Current team: Botev Vratsa
- Number: 90

Youth career
- Ludogorets Razgrad

Senior career*
Years	Team	Apps	(Gls)
2024	Ludogorets III	2	(1)
2024–2026	Ludogorets II	23	(5)
2024–2026	Ludogorets Razgrad	5	(0)
2026–	Botev Vratsa	3	(2)

International career
2022–2024	Bulgaria U17	12	(1)
2024–	Bulgaria U19	3	(3)
- * Club domestic league appearances and goals as of 10:39, 9 September 2026 (UTC)

Filip Gigov (Bulgarian: Филип Гигов; born 29 March 2007) is a Bulgarian professional footballer who plays as a forward for Botev Vratsa.

== Career ==
Gigov began his career in Ludogorets Academy. In June 2024 he signed his first professional contract with the club. In December he was included in the winter camp of the first team. He made his professional debut for the club on 23 January 2025 in a UEFA Europa League league phase match against the Danish club Midtjylland.

== Career statistics ==
=== Club ===
As of 7 August 2025

Club performance			League		Cup		Continental		Other		Total	
Club	League	Season	Apps	Goals	Apps	Goals	Apps	Goals	Apps	Goals	Apps	Goals
Bulgaria			League		Bulgarian Cup		Europe		Other		Total	
Ludogorets III	Third League	2024–25	2	1	–		–		–		2	1
Ludogorets II	Second League	2024–25	22	3	–		–		–		22	3
Ludogorets II	Second League	2024–25	1	1	–		–		–		1	1
Ludogorets II	Total		23	4	0	0	0	0	0	0	23	4
Ludogorets Razgrad	First League	2023–24	0	0	0	0	0	0	0	0	0	0
Ludogorets Razgrad	First League	2024–25	2	0	0	0	1	0	0	0	3	0
Ludogorets Razgrad	First League	2025–26	3	0	0	0	0	0	0	0	3	0
Ludogorets Razgrad	Total		5	0	0	0	1	0	0	0	6	0
Career statistics			30	5	0	0	1	0	0	0	31	5
