= Zahari Sirakov =

Bulgarian footballer

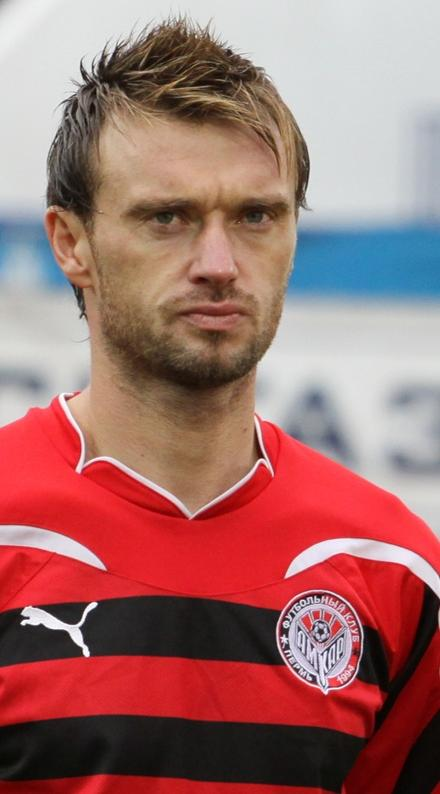
- Sirakov with Amkar in 2011

Personal information
- Date of birth: 8 October 1977 (age 49)
- Place of birth: Smolyan, Bulgaria
- Height: 1.81 m (5 ft 11 in)
- Position: Right-back

Team information
- Current team: Sportist Svoge (manager)

Senior career*
Years	Team	Apps	(Gls)
1996	Levski Kyustendil	12	(0)
1997–2001	Levski Sofia	98	(8)
2001–2002	Spartak Pleven	27	(1)
2002	APOEL	5	(0)
2003	Lokomotiv Sofia	4	(0)
2003	Rodopa Smolyan	12	(0)
2004–2015	Amkar Perm	276	(7)
Total		434	(16)

International career
1997–1998	Bulgaria U-21	15	(0)
1998–2010	Bulgaria	4	(0)

Managerial career
- 2020: Levski Sofia U17
- 2020–2021: Ludogorets Razgrad U19
- 2021–2023: Ludogorets Razgrad III
- 2024–2025: Ludogorets Razgrad II
- 2024: Ludogorets Razgrad (interim)
- 2026–: Sportist Svoge
- * Club domestic league appearances and goals

Zahari Sirakov (Bulgarian: Захари Сираков; born 8 October 1977) is a Bulgarian football coach and a former player. He is the manager of Sportist Svoge.

== Career ==
Sirakov started his career with Levski Kyustendil, but made a name for himself in Bulgaria while playing for Levski Sofia. On 24 September 1999, he scored a last-minute goal against Litex Lovech in an A Group match to bring the score to 1–1 in the heated derby encounter, prompting a brief pitch invasion by joyous Levski supporters. Sirakov was also notable for his sportsmanship, on one occasion shaking the hand of referee Atanas Uzunov after receiving a red card in a match against CSKA Sofia. He has remained popular with Bulgarian supporters even after starting his Russian adventures.

In February 2004, Sirakov signed with Russian club Amkar Perm. After more than 11 years with Amkar, Sirakov ended his career at the end of 2014–15 season.

== International career ==
After first receiving a call-up for a friendly match against Morocco prior to the 1998 World Cup, but withdrawing due to an injury, Sirakov made his debut for Bulgaria against Poland on 6 September 1998. However, he received his second cap in 2007 during UEFA Euro 2008 qualifying. In August 2010, he earned a recall to the national side due to an injury suffered by Georgi Sarmov and on 11 August 2010, he came on as a substitute in the 0–1 away loss in a friendly match against Russia.

== Managerial career ==
Sirakov became a youth coach in Levski in 2015, right after announcing retirement. In 2018 he became a coach of Levski U15 and in 2020 he was promoted to U17 team. In November 2020 he was announced as the new manager of Ludogorets III, together with the U19 team. In January 2024 he was promoted to manager of Ludogorets Razgrad II in Second League. In August 2024, Sirakov was appointed as interim manager of the first team after Georgi Dermendzhiev stepped down as head coach following the club's elimination from the Champions League. In his first match in charge, he led the “eagles” from Razgrad to a 1:0 league win over former club Levski Sofia.

== Managerial statistics ==
As of 30 September 2024

Team	From	To	Record							
Team	From	To	G	W	D	L	Win %	GF	GA	GD
(Bulgaria) Ludogorets Razgrad III	23 December 2021	1 January 2024	54	34	8	12	62.96	148	64	+84
(Bulgaria) Ludogorets Razgrad II	8 January 2024	present	19	7	8	4	36.84	26	20	+6
(Bulgaria) Ludogorets Razgrad (interim)	15 August 2024	26 September 2024	9	7	1	1	77.78	14	3	+11
Total			82	48	17	17	58.54	188	87	+101

== Personal life ==
Sirakov is married to Irina and they have a son named Aleksandar.

== Honours ==
=== Club ===
PFC Levski Sofia

- Champion of Bulgaria -2000, 2001
- Bulgarian Cup 1998, 2000

APOEL

- Cypriot Super Cup : 2002
