= Petar Stanić =

Serbian footballer

Personal information
- Full name: Petar Stanić
- Date of birth: 14 August 2001 (age 25)
- Place of birth: Pančevo, Serbia, FR Yugoslavia
- Height: 1.86 m (6 ft 1 in)
- Position: Attacking midfielder

Team information
- Current team: Ludogorets Razgrad
- Number: 14

Senior career*
Years	Team	Apps	(Gls)
2019–2020	Dinamo 1945	15	(4)
2020–2021	Železničar Pančevo	29	(5)
2021–2023	Red Star Belgrade	13	(0)
2022–2023	→ Spartak Subotica (loan)	30	(3)
2023–2025	TSC	63	(13)
2025–	Ludogorets Razgrad	45	(11)

International career^{‡}
2021–2022	Serbia U21	3	(0)
2026–	Serbia	2	(1)
- * Club domestic league appearances and goals as of 10 November 2026 ‡ National team caps and goals as of 5 June 2026

Petar Stanić (Serbian Cyrillic: Петар Станић; born 14 August 2001) is a Serbian professional footballer who plays as an attacking midfielder for Bulgarian First League club Ludogorets Razgrad and the Serbia national team.

== Club career ==
=== Red Star Belgrade ===
Stanić signed a four-years contract with Red Star on 3 July 2021. He made a debut for the club on 29 August 2021 coming in as a substitute in a 1–2 away win against Čukarički.

== Career statistics ==
As of match played 9 September 2026

Club	Season	League			National cup (Note: Includes Serbian Cup, Bulgarian Cup)		Continental		Other		Total	
Club	Season	Division	Apps	Goals	Apps	Goals	Apps	Goals	Apps	Goals	Apps	Goals
Dinamo 1945	2018–19	Serbian League Vojvodina	1	0	—		—		—		1	0
Dinamo 1945	2019–20	Serbian League Vojvodina	14	4	—		—		—		14	4
Dinamo 1945	Total		15	4	0	0	0	0	0	0	15	4
Železničar Pančevo	2020–21	Serbian First League	29	6	—		—		—		29	6
Red Star Belgrade	2021–22	Serbian SuperLiga	13	0	2	1	1 (Note: Appearances in UEFA Europa League)	0	—		16	1
Spartak Subotica (loan)	2022–23	Serbian SuperLiga	30	3	1	0	—		—		31	3
TSC	2023–24	Serbian SuperLiga	30	5	1	0	6 (Note: Two appearances in UEFA Champions League, four appearances and one goal in UEFA Europa League)	1	—		37	6
TSC	2024–25	Serbian SuperLiga	33	8	4	1	10 (Note: Two appearances in UEFA Europa League, eight appearances and three goals in UEFA Conference League)	3	—		47	12
TSC	Total		63	13	5	1	16	4	0	0	84	18
Ludogorets Razgrad	2025–26	Bulgarian First League	34	9	4	0	16 (Note: Four appearances in UEFA Champions League, twelve appearances and seven goals in UEFA Europa League)	7	1 (Note: Appearance in Bulgarian Supercup)	0	55	16
Ludogorets Razgrad	2026–27	Bulgarian First League	7	0	0	0	2 (Note: Two appearances in UEFA Europa Conference League)	0	0	0	9	0
Ludogorets Razgrad	Total		41	9	4	0	18	7	1	0	64	16
Career total			191	35	12	2	35	11	1	0	239	48

=== International ===
As of match played 4 June 2026

Appearances and goals by national team and year
National team	Year	Apps	Goals
Serbia	2026	2	1
Total		2	1

Scores and results list Serbia's goal tally first.

List of international goals scored by Petar Stanić
No.	Date	Venue	Opponent	Score	Result	Competition
1.	4 June 2026	Estadio Nemesio Diez, Toluca, Mexico	Mexico	1–0	1–5	Friendly

== Honours ==
Red Star Belgrade

- Serbian SuperLiga: 2021–22
- Serbian Cup: 2021–22

Ludogorets Razgrad

- Bulgarian Supercup: 2025

Individual

- UEFA Europa League top scorer: 2025–26 (joint with Igor Jesus)
