= Ivaylo Chochev =

Bulgarian footballer

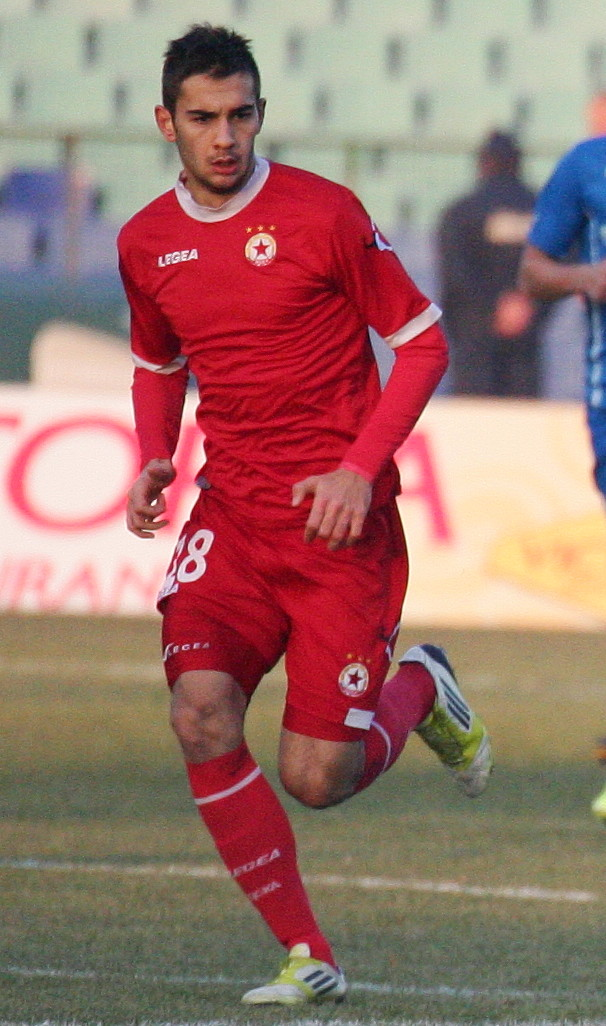
- Chochev playing for CSKA Sofia in 2013

Personal information
- Full name: Ivaylo Lyudmilov Chochev
- Date of birth: 18 February 1993 (age 33)
- Place of birth: Pleven, Bulgaria
- Height: 1.88 m (6 ft 2 in)
- Position: Midfielder

Team information
- Current team: Ludogorets Razgrad
- Number: 18

Youth career
- 2005–2008: Spartak Pleven
- 2008–2010: Chavdar Etropole

Senior career*
Years	Team	Apps	(Gls)
2010–2012	Chavdar Etropole	61	(17)
2013–2014	CSKA Sofia	50	(8)
2014–2019	Palermo	116	(12)
2019–2020	Pescara	0	(0)
2020–2024	CSKA 1948	94	(43)
2024–	Ludogorets Razgrad	91	(27)

International career^{‡}
2009	Bulgaria U17	3	(0)
2010–2011	Bulgaria U19	5	(0)
2012–2014	Bulgaria U21	9	(3)
2015–	Bulgaria	53	(4)
- * Club domestic league appearances and goals as of 10:25, 9 September 2026 (UTC) ‡ National team caps and goals as of 16 November 2026

Ivaylo Lyudmilov Chochev (Bulgarian: Ивайло Людмилов Чочев; born 18 February 1993) is a Bulgarian professional footballer who plays as a midfielder for Ludogorets Razgrad and the Bulgaria national team.

== Club career ==
=== Early career ===
Born in Pleven, Chochev began his career with local club Spartak Pleven, before moving to Chavdar Etropole in 2008.

=== CSKA Sofia ===
On 16 January 2013, Chochev joined A Group club CSKA Sofia. He made his debut in a 2–0 home win against Chernomorets Burgas on 10 March 2013.

Chochev swiftly became a regular starter. During 2013–14 season he established himself as a key member of the team. On 12 February 2014, it was officially announced that Chochev had signed a new three-year contract and doubled his previous salary.

=== Palermo ===
On 11 July 2014, Chochev moved to Serie A club Palermo, signing a three-year contract. Monaco and Wolfsburg were also keen on signing him but were not able to come to an agreement in time. Chochev scored his first goal for Palermo on 8 August, netting the tenth in a 12–0 pre-season friendly win over Calciochiese. He made his Serie A debut on 5 October against Empoli, coming on for the last 18 minutes in place of Franco Vázquez as Palermo lost 1–0 at Stadio Carlo Castellani. On 19 October, Chochev started for first time, playing 66 minutes in a 2–1 home win over Cesena. He scored his first Serie A goal on 12 April 2015, in a 3–1 away win over Udinese at Stadio Friuli. A week later on 19 April 2015, he scored another two goals against Genoa in a 2–1 home victory. His outstanding performances, both against Udinese and Genoa, saw him being named Man of the Match twice. On 22 June 2015, Chochev signed a new five-year contract.

On 25 September 2017, he provided two assists in a 2–1 home win over Pro Vercelli. He scored his first league goal of the season and received the man of the match award in a 2–2 away draw against Pescara on 3 November. He scored a volley from outside the box on 19 May 2018, in the last match of the regular season against Salernitana, in a 0–2 away win.

=== Pescara ===
In June 2019 Chochev joined Pescara, but never played because of his long recovery process from an injury he sustained in March 2019.

=== CSKA 1948 ===
In the summer of 2020, Chochev returned to Bulgaria to sign with the newly promoted to First League team CSKA 1948. He returned in play on 18 October 2020, more than a year and a half after his injury.

=== Ludogorets ===
On 15 February 2024, Chochev signed for Bulgarian champions Ludogorets Razgrad for a reported fee in the region of a million.

== International career ==
Chochev made his debut with the Under 21 national team during the Under-21 European Championship qualifying category in 2013.

He was called up to the senior national team for a friendly against Canada on 23 May 2014. He made his debut with the national team on 8 June 2015 in a 4–0 friendly loss against Turkey. He made his first start playing the full 90 minutes on 3 September 2015 as Bulgaria lost 0–1 to Norway in Sofia.

Chochev scored his first goal with the national team on 3 June 2016 during the 2016 Kirin Cup in a 2–7 defeat to Japan.

On 31 August 2017, Chochev scored the winning goal for the 3–2 win over Sweden.

On 22 March 2019, Chochev received a heavy injury in a qualification match against Montenegro.

After initially not being in new manager Mladen Krstajić's plans, Chochev was recalled to the national side for the June 2023 Euro qualifiers against Lithuania and Serbia.

== Career statistics ==
=== Club ===
As of match played 9 September 2026

Appearances and goals by club, season and competition
Club	Season	League			National cup (Note: Includes Bulgarian Cup, Coppa Italia)		Europe		Other		Total	
Club	Season	Division	Apps	Goals	Apps	Goals	Apps	Goals	Apps	Goals	Apps	Goals
Chavdar Etropole	2010–11	B Group	27	3	0	0	–		–		27	3
Chavdar Etropole	2011–12	B Group	21	6	0	0	–		–		21	6
Chavdar Etropole	2012–13	B Group	13	8	1	0	–		–		14	8
Chavdar Etropole	Total		61	17	1	0	–		–		62	17
CSKA Sofia	2012–13	A Group	10	0	2	0	0	0	–		12	0
CSKA Sofia	2013–14	A Group	35	7	3	1	–		–		38	8
CSKA Sofia	Total		45	7	5	1	0	0	–		50	8
Palermo	2014–15	Serie A	18	3	0	0	–		–		18	3
Palermo	2015–16	Serie A	27	0	1	0	–		–		28	0
Palermo	2016–17	Serie A	30	3	1	1	–		–		31	4
Palermo	2017–18	Serie B	29	5	2	0	–		–		31	5
Palermo	2018–19	Serie B	12	1	0	0	–		–		12	1
Palermo	Total		116	12	4	1	–		–		120	13
Pescara	2019–20	Serie B	0	0	0	0	–		–		0	0
CSKA 1948	2020–21	Bulgarian First League	16	3	2	1	–		–		18	4
CSKA 1948	2021–22	Bulgarian First League	30	13	1	0	–		–		31	13
CSKA 1948	2022–23	Bulgarian First League	31	21	5	3	–		–		36	24
CSKA 1948	2023–24	Bulgarian First League	17	6	3	1	0	0	–		20	7
CSKA 1948	Total		94	43	11	5	0	0	–		105	48
Ludogorets Razgrad	2023–24	Bulgarian First League	14	1	2	1	0	0	–		16	2
Ludogorets Razgrad	2024–25	Bulgarian First League	32	5	4	1	14 (Note: Six appearances in UEFA Champions League, eight appearances and one goal in UEFA Europa League)	1	1 (Note: Appearance in Bulgarian Supercup)	1	51	8
Ludogorets Razgrad	2025–26	Bulgarian First League	37	17	5	1	16 (Note: Four appearances and one goal in UEFA Champions League, twelve appearances and two goals in UEFA Europa League)	3	1	0	59	21
Ludogorets Razgrad	2026–27	Bulgarian First League	8	4	0	0	2 (Note: Appearances in UEFA Conference League)	0	–		10	4
Ludogorets Razgrad	Total		91	27	11	3	32	4	2	1	136	35
Career total			407	106	32	10	32	4	2	1	473	121

=== International ===
As of match played 16 November 2026

Appearances and goals by national team and year
National team	Year	Apps	Goals
Bulgaria	2015	4	0
Bulgaria	2016	8	1
Bulgaria	2017	7	2
Bulgaria	2018	2	0
Bulgaria	2019	1	0
Bulgaria	2020	0	0
Bulgaria	2021	9	1
Bulgaria	2022	4	0
Bulgaria	2023	7	0
Bulgaria	2024	4	0
Bulgaria	2025	5	0
2026	2	0	
Total		53	4

As of match played 5 September 2021. Bulgaria score listed first, score column indicates score after each Chochev goal.

International goals by date, venue, cap, opponent, score, result and competition
No.	Date	Venue	Cap	Opponent	Score	Result	Competition
1	3 June 2016	Toyota Stadium, Toyota, Japan	7	Japan	2–7	2–7	2016 Kirin Cup
2	31 August 2017	Vasil Levski National Stadium, Sofia, Bulgaria	13	Sweden	3–2	3–2	2018 FIFA World Cup qualification
3	10 October 2017	Stade Josy Barthel, Luxembourg City, Luxembourg	15	Luxembourg	1–1	1–1	2018 FIFA World Cup qualification
4	5 September 2021	Vasil Levski National Stadium, Sofia, Bulgaria	26	Lithuania	1–0	1–0	2022 FIFA World Cup qualification

== Honours ==
Ludogorets Razgrad

- Bulgarian First League: 2023–24, 2024–25
- Bulgarian Cup: 2024–25
- Bulgarian Supercup: 2024

Individual

- Best midfielder in Bulgarian football: 2021
- Bulgarian First League Top Scorer: 2022–23
- Bulgarian Footballer of the Year second place: 2015; third place: 2022, 2023
- Bulgarian First League Player of the Season: 2024–25, 2025–26
