= Nikolay Nikolov (footballer, born 2005) =

Bulgarian footballer (born 2005)

Personal information
- Full name: Nikolay Ivaylov Nikolov
- Date of birth: 8 August 2005 (age 21)
- Place of birth: Pleven, Bulgaria
- Height: 1.76 m (5 ft 9 in)
- Position: Defender

Team information
- Current team: Ludogorets II
- Number: 29

Youth career
- Ludogorets Razgrad

Senior career*
Years	Team	Apps	(Gls)
2022–2024	Ludogorets III	27	(6)
2023–	Ludogorets II	49	(2)
2024–	Ludogorets Razgrad	1	(0)

International career
2023	Bulgaria U18	1	(0)
- * Club domestic league appearances and goals as of 06:06, 5 May 2025 (UTC)

Nikolay Nikolov (Bulgarian: Николай Николов; born 8 August 2005) is a Bulgarian footballer who plays as a defender for Ludogorets II.

== Career ==
Nikolov completed his league debut for Ludogorets Razgrad on 29 May 2024 in a match against Levski Sofia.
