= Kristian Tomov =

Bulgarian footballer (born 2002)

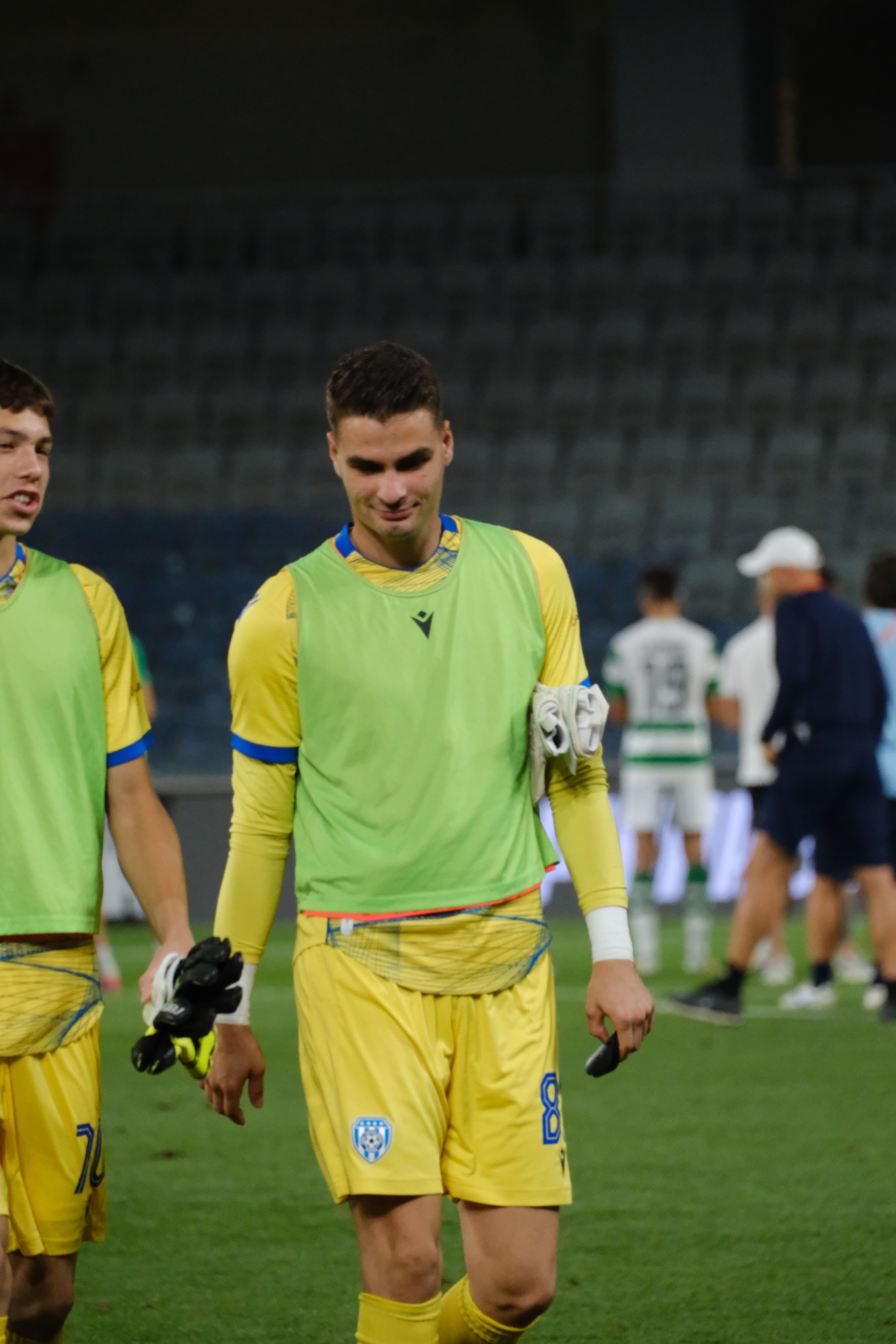

Personal information
- Full name: Kristian Hristov Tomov
- Date of birth: 17 August 2002 (age 24)
- Place of birth: Plovdiv, Bulgaria
- Height: 1.89 m (6 ft 2 in)
- Position: Goalkeeper

Team information
- Current team: Cherno More
- Number: 81

Youth career
- 2009–2021: Lokomotiv Plovdiv

Senior career*
Years	Team	Apps	(Gls)
2020–2025	Lokomotiv Plovdiv	23	(0)
2025–	Cherno More	20	(0)

International career
2020	Bulgaria U19	2	(0)
- * Club domestic league appearances and goals as of 08:58, 26 May 2026 (UTC)

Kristian Hristov Tomov (Bulgarian: Кристиан Христов Томов; born 17 August 2002) is a Bulgarian professional footballer who plays as goalkeeper for First League club Cherno More Varna.

== Career ==
Tomov joined Lokomotiv Plovdiv's academy at the age of seven before signing his first professional contract with the club on 25 February 2021. He made his First League debut on 26 May 2021 in a 3–3 away draw against Arda Kardzhali. He left the club after his contract expired at the end of the 2024–25 season.

On 10 June 2025, Tomov signed a contract as a free agent with Cherno More Varna. On 4 August 2025, he was named in the starting line-up for Cherno More in a league match against Beroe, being his competitive debut for the club. Tomov kept a clean sheet in his first five games for Cherno More.

== Career statistics ==
As of match played 26 May 2026

Appearances and goals by club, season and competition
Club	Season	League			Cup		Continental		Other		Total	
Club	Season	Division	Apps	Goals	Apps	Goals	Apps	Goals	Apps	Goals	Apps	Goals
Lokomotiv Plovdiv	2019–20	First League	0	0	1	0	0	0	—		1	0
Lokomotiv Plovdiv	2020–21	First League	1	0	0	0	0	0	—		1	0
Lokomotiv Plovdiv	2021–22	First League	0	0	0	0	0	0	—		0	0
Lokomotiv Plovdiv	2022–23	First League	1	0	0	0	—		—		1	0
Lokomotiv Plovdiv	2023–24	First League	12	0	1	0	—		—		13	0
Lokomotiv Plovdiv	2024–25	First League	9	0	1	0	—		—		10	0
Lokomotiv Plovdiv	Total		23	0	3	0	0	0	—		26	0
Cherno More	2025–26	First League	20	0	2	0	0	0	—		22	0
Cherno More	2026–27	First League	0	0	0	0	—		—		0	0
Cherno More	Total		20	0	2	0	0	0	—		22	0
Career total			43	0	5	0	0	0	0	0	48	0
