= Hendrik Bonmann =

German footballer (born 1994)

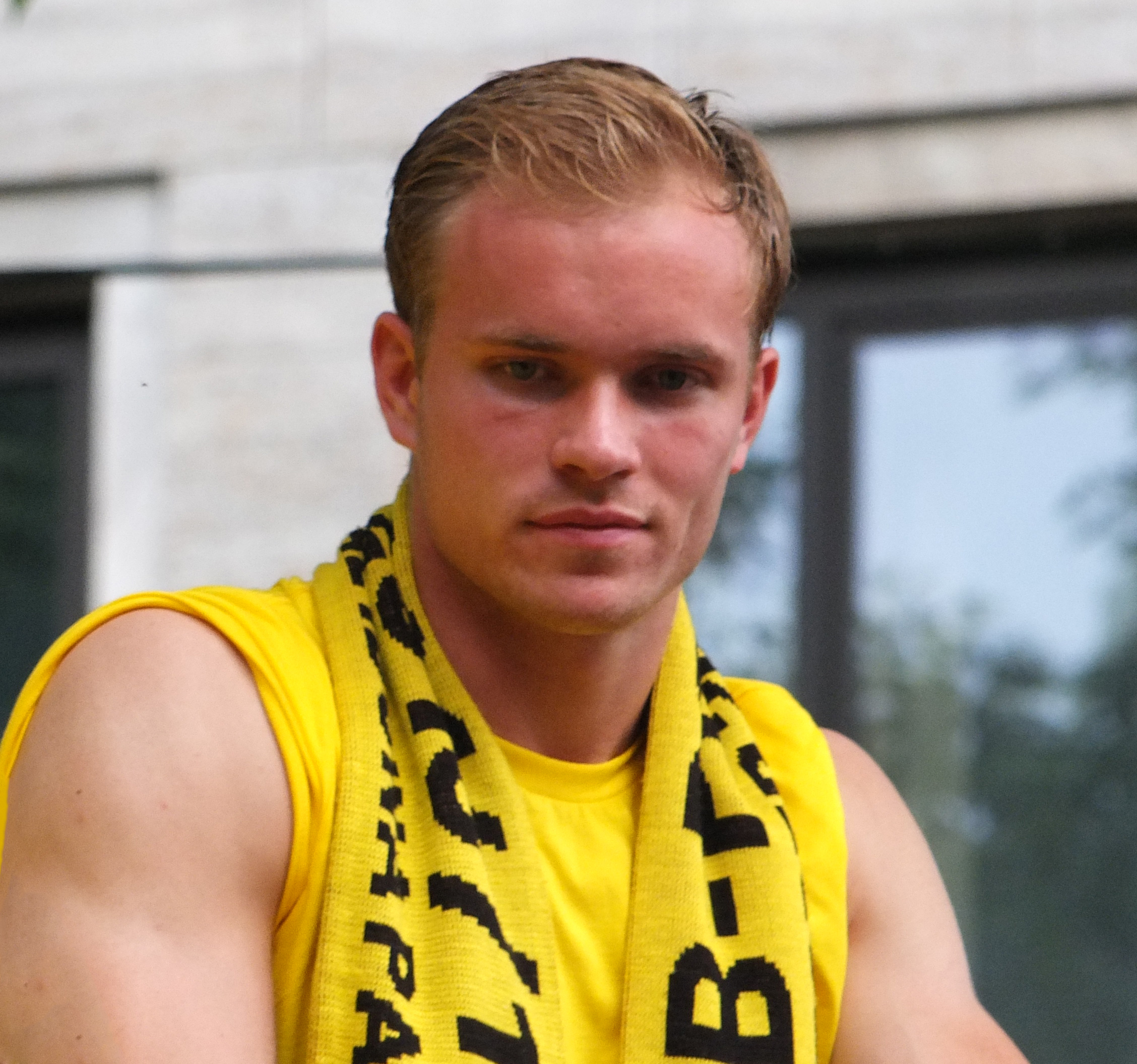
- Bonmann in 2017

Personal information
- Date of birth: 22 January 1994 (age 32)
- Place of birth: Essen, Germany
- Height: 1.94 m (6 ft 4 in)
- Position: Goalkeeper

Team information
- Current team: Ludogorets Razgrad
- Number: 39

Youth career
- 2001–2004: Fortuna Bredeney
- 2004–2009: Schalke 04
- 2009–2013: Rot-Weiss Essen

Senior career*
Years	Team	Apps	(Gls)
2012–2013	Rot-Weiss Essen	6	(0)
2013–2017	Borussia Dortmund II	67	(0)
2015–2017	Borussia Dortmund	0	(0)
2017–2020	1860 Munich	22	(0)
2017	1860 Munich II	5	(0)
2020–2022	Würzburger Kickers	54	(0)
2022–2024	Wolfsberger AC	55	(0)
2024–	Ludogorets Razgrad	51	(0)
- * Club domestic league appearances and goals as of 9 September 2026

Hendrik Bonmann (born 22 January 1994) is a German professional footballer who plays as a goalkeeper for Bulgarian First League club Ludogorets Razgrad.

== Career ==
On 23 May 2022, Bonmann signed a two-year contract with an option for an additional season with Austrian Bundesliga club Wolfsberger AC, after his contract with recently relegated Regionalliga Bayern club Würzburger Kickers had expired. In May 2024, he joined Bulgarian team Ludogorets Razgrad.

== Career statistics ==
=== Club ===
As of match played 9 September 2026

Appearances and goals by club, season and competition
Club	Season	League			National cup		Continental		Total	
Club	Season	Division	Apps	Goals	Apps	Goals	Apps	Goals	Apps	Goals
Rot-Weiss Essen	2012–13	Regionalliga	6	0	—		—		6	0
Borussia Dortmund II	2013–14	3. Liga	4	0	—		—		4	0
Borussia Dortmund II	2014–15	3. Liga	7	0	—		—		7	0
Borussia Dortmund II	2015–16	Regionalliga	34	0	—		—		34	0
Borussia Dortmund II	2016–17	Regionalliga	21	0	—		—		21	0
Borussia Dortmund II	2017–18	Regionalliga	0	0	—		—		0	0
Borussia Dortmund II	Total		66	0	—		—		66	0
Borussia Dortmund	2013–14	Bundesliga	0	0	—		—		0	0
Borussia Dortmund	2014–15	Bundesliga	—		0	0	—		0	0
Borussia Dortmund	2015–16	Bundesliga	0	0	—		0	0	0	0
Borussia Dortmund	2016–17	Bundesliga	0	0	0	0	0	0	0	0
Borussia Dortmund	2017–18	Bundesliga	0	0	—		—		0	0
Borussia Dortmund	Total		0	0	0	0	0	0	0	0
1860 Munich II	2017–18	Oberliga	5	0	—		—		5	0
1860 Munich	2017–18	Regionalliga	3	0	—		—		3	0
1860 Munich	2018–19	3. Liga	6	0	0	0	—		6	0
1860 Munich	2019–20	3. Liga	13	0	—		—		13	0
1860 Munich	Total		22	0	0	0	—		22	0
Würzburger Kickers	2020–21	2. Bundesliga	20	0	—		—		20	0
Würzburger Kickers	2021–22	3. Liga	34	0	1	0	—		35	0
Würzburger Kickers	Total		54	0	1	0	—		55	0
Wolfsberger AC	2022–23	Austrian Bundesliga	32	0	0	0	4 (Note: Appearance(s) in UEFA Europa Conference League)	0	36	0
Wolfsberger AC	2023–24	Austrian Bundesliga	24	0	0	0	—		24	0
Wolfsberger AC	Total		56	0	0	0	4	0	60	0
Ludogorets	2024–25	Parva Liga	17	0	3	0	7 (Note: Appearance(s) in UEFA Champions League)	0	27	0
Ludogorets	2025–26	Parva Liga	26	0	3	0	12	0	41	0
Ludogorets	2026–27	Parva Liga	8	0	0	0	2 (Note: Appearance(s) in UEFA Conference League)	0	10	0
Ludogorets	Total		51	0	6	0	21	0	78	0
Career Total			256	0	7	0	25	0	288	0
