= PFC Ludogorets Razgrad Academy =

Bulgarian Third League football team

Ludogorets III and Academy
- Full name: Professional Football Club Ludogorets Razgrad III and Academy
- Nicknames: The Eagles; Ludogorets babies
- Short name: Ludogorets III
- Founded: 2013; 13 years ago (Academy); 2020; 6 years ago (Ludogorets III)
- Ground: Eagles' Nest, Razgrad
- Capacity: 2,000
- Owner: Kiril Domuschiev
- Chairman: Aleksandar Aleksandrov
- Head coach: Hristo Zlatinski
- League: Bulgarian Third League
- 2023–24: 1st
- Website: http://www.ludogorets.com/all_news.php
Home colours	Away colours	Third colours

Ludogorets III (Bulgarian: Лудогорец III) or Ludogorets 3 is a Bulgarian amateur football team based in Razgrad. Founded in 2020, it is the third team of PFC Ludogorets Razgrad, and currently plays in Third League, the third level of Bulgarian football.

Obliged to play one level below their main side, Ludogorets III is ineligible for promotion to Second League, where plays the reserve team Ludogorets II, and also can not compete in the Bulgarian Cup.

The Ludogorets Academy, founded in 2013, is the youth academy of Ludogorets Razgrad.

== History ==
In August 2020 Ludogorets started a third team, which joined the Bulgarian Third League. In November 2020 Zahari Sirakov was announced as the new manager of Ludogorets III and U19 team. In 2021 U19 League was disbanded.

On 26 May 2024 the team secured the North-East Third League title. Petar Kirev from the team become a top goalscorer of the league with 21 goals.

== Honours ==
- Third League:
  - Winners (1): 2023–24

== Ludogorets III ==
=== Current squad ===
As of 1 September 2026

Note: Flags indicate national team as defined under FIFA eligibility rules; some limited exceptions apply. Players may hold more than one non-FIFA nationality.

No.	Pos.	Nation	Player
1	GK	BUL	Zlatomir Stoimenov
2	DF	BUL	Nikolay Nikolov
3	DF	BUL	Hristian Atanasov
7	MF	BUL	Nikolay Georgiev
9	FW	BUL	Antonio Popov
10	FW	BUL	Petar Kirev
11	DF	BUL	Kristiyan Ivanov
13	DF	BUL	Georgi Karaivanov

No.	Pos.	Nation	Player
16	MF	BUL	Dimitar Ivanov
17	FW	BUL	Kristiyan Nikolov
18	MF	BUL	Nikola Todorov
19	FW	BUL	Martin Stanchev
21	FW	BUL	Stefan Valchev
24	MF	BUL	Deniz Hadzhiev
93	FW	BUL	Yoan Yordanov

=== Seasons ===
Results of league and cup competitions by season
Season	League											Top goalscorer	
Season	Division	Level	P	W	D	L	F	A	GD	Pts	Pos	Top goalscorer	
2020–21	Third League	3	28	15	6	7	75	29	+46	51	6th	(Bulgaria) Stanislav Valchev	17
2021–22	Third League	3	26	17	4	5	66	16	+50	55	4th	(Bulgaria) Yoan Yordanov	10
2022–23	Third League	3	28	17	3	8	79	31	+48	54	5th	(Bulgaria) Petar Kirev	15
2023–24	Third League	3	26	19	4	3	69	16	+53	61	1st	(Bulgaria) Petar Kirev	21

=== Managerial history ===
Dates	Name	Honours
2020	(Bulgaria) Dimcho Nenov	
2020–2023	(Bulgaria) Zahari Sirakov	
2024	(Bulgaria) Emiliyan Petrov	
2024–2025	(Bulgaria) Martin Tsirkov	
2025–	(Bulgaria) Hristo Zlatinski	

== Staff ==
Position	Name	Nationality
Ludogorets III
Head coach	Emiliyan Petrov	(Bulgaria)
Assistant coach	Emil Ivanov	(Bulgaria)
Goalkeepers coach	Zdravko Chavdarov	(Bulgaria)
Ludogorets U17
Head coach	Martin Tsirkov	(Bulgaria)
Assistant coach	Dimitar Stoykov	(Bulgaria)
Goalkeepers coach	Dobrin Dobrev	(Bulgaria)
Ludogorets U16
Head coach	Rosen Marinov	(Bulgaria)
Assistant coach	Svetlin Ivanov	(Bulgaria)
Goalkeepers coach	Dobrin Dobrev	(Bulgaria)
Ludogorets U15
Head coach	Milen Marinov	(Bulgaria)
Assistant coach	Hristos Dokov	(Bulgaria)
Goalkeepers coach	Ventsislav Bogdanov	(Bulgaria)
Ludogorets U14
Head coach	Hristiyan Petrov	(Bulgaria)
Assistant coach	Dimcho Nenov	(Bulgaria)
Goalkeepers coach	Ventsislav Bogdanov	(Bulgaria)
Ludogorets U13
Head coach	Emil Georgiev	(Bulgaria)
Assistant coach	Diyan Angelov	(Bulgaria)
Goalkeepers coach	Zdravko Chavdarov	(Bulgaria)
