= 2023–24 PFC Ludogorets Razgrad season =

Ludogorets Razgrad
2023–24 season
- Chairman: Temenuga Gazdova
- Manager: Ivaylo Petev (until 24 October 2023); Georgi Dermendzhiev (since 24 October 2023)
- First League: 1st
- Bulgarian Cup: Runners-up
- Bulgarian Supercup: Winners
- Champions League: Second qualifying round
- Europa League: Play-off round
- Conference League: Knockout round play-offs
- Top goalscorer: League: Rwan Cruz (14); All: Rwan Cruz (19)
- Highest home attendance: 10,363 v. Fenerbahçe (9 November 2023)
- Lowest home attendance: 123 v. Botev Plovdiv (16 September 2023)
- Average home league attendance: 1,743
- Biggest win: 6–0 v. Lokomotiv Sofia (H)
- Biggest defeat: 1–7 v. Nordsjælland (A)
Home colours	Away colours	Third colours

The 2023–24 season was Ludogorets Razgrad's thirteenth consecutive season in the First League, of which they are defending champions. This article shows player statistics and all matches (official and friendly) that the club has played during the season.

At the end of the season, Ludogorets won their record-extending 13th First League title.

== Players ==
=== First-team squad ===
As of 26 May 2024

Note: Flags indicate national team as defined under FIFA eligibility rules; some limited exceptions apply. Players may hold more than one non-FIFA nationality.

No.	Pos.	Nation	Player
1	GK	NED	Sergio Padt
3	DF	BUL	Anton Nedyalkov (captain)
4	DF	POR	Dinis Almeida
5	DF	BUL	Georgi Terziev
6	MF	POL	Jakub Piotrowski
7	FW	BRA	Rick
8	MF	POR	Claude Gonçalves
9	FW	SUI	Kwadwo Duah
10	FW	ARG	Matías Tissera
12	GK	CRO	Simon Sluga
14	DF	ISR	Denny Gropper
16	DF	NOR	Aslak Fonn Witry
17	DF	ESP	Son

No.	Pos.	Nation	Player
18	MF	BUL	Ivaylo Chochev
24	DF	BEN	Olivier Verdon
26	DF	GAM	Noah Sonko Sundberg
30	MF	BRA	Pedro Naressi
37	FW	GHA	Bernard Tekpetey
44	DF	GER	Marcel Heister
64	MF	BUL	Dominik Yankov
77	FW	BRA	Caio Vidal
82	MF	BUL	Ivan Yordanov
88	MF	BUL	Todor Nedelev
90	FW	BUL	Spas Delev
99	FW	BRA	Rwan Cruz

=== Out on loan ===
Note: Flags indicate national team as defined under FIFA eligibility rules; some limited exceptions apply. Players may hold more than one non-FIFA nationality.

No.	Pos.	Nation	Player
2	DF	ESP	Pipa (to West Bromwich Albion until 30 June 2024)
11	FW	FRA	Mounir Chouiar (to Amiens until 30 June 2024)
15	DF	BRA	Pedro Henrique (to Guarani until 30 June 2024)
22	DF	ARG	Franco Russo (to OH Leuven until 30 June 2024)

No.	Pos.	Nation	Player
38	FW	BUL	Vladislav Naydenov (to Etar until 30 June 2024)
51	DF	BUL	Ilker Budinov (to Etar until 30 June 2024)
67	GK	BUL	Damyan Hristov (to Etar until 30 June 2024)

=== Reserve team ===
Note: Flags indicate national team as defined under FIFA eligibility rules; some limited exceptions apply. Players may hold more than one non-FIFA nationality.

No.	Pos.	Nation	Player
—	FW	BRA	Raí

== Transfers ==
=== In ===
Date	Pos.	Player	Transferred from	Fee	Source
23 June 2023	DF	(Germany) Marcel Heister	(Hungary) Fehérvár	Free	
1 July 2023	DF	(Brazil) Pedro Henrique	(Bulgaria) Beroe	Loan return	
1 July 2023	MF	(Bulgaria) Ivan Yordanov	(Bulgaria) Spartak Varna	Loan return	
1 July 2023	FW	(Romania) Dorin Rotariu	(Greece) Atromitos	Loan return	
7 July 2023	DF	(Spain) Son	(Spain) Levante	Undisclosed	
19 July 2023	FW	(Switzerland) Kwadwo Duah	(Germany) Nürnberg	€3,000,000	
22 July 2023	FW	(Brazil) Rwan Cruz	(Brazil) Santos	Loan	
26 July 2023	DF	(The Gambia) Noah Sonko Sundberg	(Bulgaria) Levski Sofia	Undisclosed	
5 September 2023	FW	(France) Mounir Chouiar	(Turkey) İstanbul Başakşehir	Free	
31 January 2024	FW	(Brazil) Rwan Cruz	(Brazil) Santos	Undisclosed	
15 February 2024	MF	(Bulgaria) Ivaylo Chochev	(Bulgaria) CSKA 1948	Undisclosed	

=== Out ===
Date	Pos.	Player	Transferred to	Fee	Source
14 June 2023	FW	(Brazil) Igor Thiago	(Belgium) Club Brugge	€8,000,000	
4 August 2023	MF	(Brazil) Nonato	(Brazil) Santos	Loan	
14 August 2023	MF	(Angola) Show	(Israel) Maccabi Haifa	Undisclosed	
24 August 2023	MF	(Romania) Dorin Rotariu	(Romania) FCSB	Free	
2 September 2023	DF	(Spain) Pipa	(England) West Bromwich Albion	Loan	
4 September 2023	FW	(Bulgaria) Kiril Despodov	(Greece) PAOK	€3,500,000	
30 December 2023	DF	(Slovenia) Žan Karničnik	(Slovenia) Celje	Undisclosed	
8 January 2024	DF	(Brazil) Pedro Henrique	(Brazil) Guarani	Loan	
26 January 2024	FW	(France) Mounir Chouiar	(France) Amiens	Loan	
31 January 2024	MF	(Brazil) Nonato	(Brazil) Santos	Undisclosed	
1 February 2024	DF	(Argentina) Franco Russo	(Belgium) OH Leuven	Loan	
8 February 2024	DF	(Ukraine) Ihor Plastun	(Kazakhstan) Ordabasy	Free	

== Pre-season and friendlies ==
Win Draw Loss Fixtures

22 June 2023 Friendly	Ludogorets Razgrad	1–0	Marek	Bansko
18:15 UTC+3	Tissera 33'	Report		Stadium: Evima Sports Complex

26 June 2023 Friendly	Lokomotiv Plovdiv	0–3	Ludogorets Razgrad	Bansko
18:00 UTC+3		Report	Tissera 12', 15'; Naressi 53'	Stadium: Stadion Sveti Petar

1 July 2023 Friendly	Ludogorets Razgrad	2–0	(Romania) Universitatea Craiova	Bansko
18:00 UTC+3	Caio Vidal 24'; Tissera 68'	Report		Stadium: Evima Sports Complex

24 January 2024 Friendly	Ludogorets Razgrad (Bulgaria)	3–0	(Slovenia) Olimpija Ljubljana	Belek, Turkey
17:00 UTC+3	Duah 12'; Nedelev 31'; Tekpetey 44'	Report		Stadium: Cornelia Sports Complex

27 January 2024 Friendly	Ludogorets Razgrad (Bulgaria)	3–1	(Poland) Raków Częstochowa	Belek, Turkey
17:00 UTC+3	Duah 2'; Kovačević 8' (o.g.); Rick 90+2'	Report	Crnac 5'	Stadium: Cornelia Sports Complex

30 January 2024 Friendly	Ludogorets Razgrad (Bulgaria)	1–3	(Czech Republic) Teplice	Belek, Turkey
17:00 UTC+3	Rwan Cruz 14'	Report	Hronek 30'; Gning 46', 48'	Stadium: Cornelia Sports Complex

31 January 2024 Friendly	Ludogorets Razgrad (Bulgaria)	3–1	(Czech Republic) Sigma Olomouc	Belek, Turkey
18:00 UTC+3	Tekpetey 9'; Duah 34'; Rick 87'	Report	Juliš 18'	Stadium: Cornelia Sports Complex

3 February 2024 Friendly	Ludogorets Razgrad (Bulgaria)	1–1	(Czech Republic) Mladá Boleslav	Belek, Turkey
17:30 UTC+3	Tekpetey 14'	Report	Ladra 32'	Stadium: Cornelia Sports Complex

23 March 2024 Friendly	Ludogorets Razgrad (Bulgaria)	2–3	(Romania) Steaua București	Razgrad
16:30 UTC+2	Gonçalves 24'; Rwan Cruz 38'	Report	Gonçalves 1' (o.g.); Miguélez 33'; Chipirliu 67' (pen.)	Stadium: Huvepharma Arena

== Competitions ==
Competition	First match	Last match	Starting round	Final position	Record							
Competition	First match	Last match	Starting round	Final position	Pld	W	D	L	GF	GA	GD	Win %
First League	14 July 2023	26 May 2024	Matchday 1	Winners	35	26	4	5	87	24	+63	74.29
Bulgarian Cup	22 November 2023	15 May 2024	Round of 32	Runners-up	6	5	0	1	22	4	+18	83.33
Bulgarian Supercup	10 February 2024		Final	Winners	1	0	1	0	1	1	+0	0.00
UEFA Champions League	11 July 2023	1 August 2023	First qualifying round	Second qualifying round	4	1	1	2	6	5	+1	25.00
UEFA Europa League	8 August 2023	31 August 2023	Third qualifying round	Play-off round	4	2	0	2	8	7	+1	50.00
UEFA Europa Conference League	21 September 2023	22 February 2024	Group stage	Knockout round play-offs	8	4	1	3	11	12	−1	50.00
Total					58	38	7	13	135	53	+82	65.52

Last updated: 26 May 2024
Source: Soccerway

=== First League ===
==== Regular stage ====
===== League table =====
Pos	Team	Pld	W	D	L	GF	GA	GD	Pts	Qualification
1	Ludogorets Razgrad	30	24	3	3	78	15	+63	75	Qualification for the Championship group
2	CSKA Sofia	30	19	6	5	50	19	+31	63	Qualification for the Championship group
3	Cherno More	30	18	8	4	47	25	+22	62	Qualification for the Championship group
4	Lokomotiv Plovdiv	30	16	7	7	50	34	+16	55	Qualification for the Championship group
5	Levski Sofia	30	16	6	8	45	26	+19	54	Qualification for the Championship group

Source: soccerway, Bulgarian Football
Rules for classification: 1) Points; 2) Head-to-head points; 3) Head-to-head goal difference; 4) Head-to-head goals scored; 5) Head-to-head away goals scored (only if two teams); 6) Goal difference; 7) Goals scored; 8) Fairplay ranking; 9) Draw

===== Results summary =====
Overall								Home						Away					
Pld	W	D	L	GF	GA	GD	Pts	W	D	L	GF	GA	GD	W	D	L	GF	GA	GD
30	24	3	3	78	15	+63	75	13	2	1	54	9	+45	11	1	2	24	6	+18

Last updated: 20 April 2024.
Source: bulgarian-football.com

===== Results by round =====
Round	1	2	3	4	5	6	7	8	9	10	11	12	13	14	15	16	17	18	19	20	21	22	23	24	25	26	27	28	29	30
Ground	A	H	A	A	H	A	H	A	H	A	H	A	H	A	H	H	A	H	H	A	H	A	H	A	H	A	H	A	H	A
Result	L	W	W	W	W	L	W	W	D	W	D	W	W	D	W	W	W	L	W	W	W	W	W	W	W	W	W	W	W	W
Position	16	10	11	6	4	7	6	5	5	5	7	5	4	5	4	3	3	3	3	2	1	1	1	1	1	1	1	1	1	1

Source: bulgarian-football.com
A = Away; H = Home; W = Win; D = Draw; L = Loss

===== Results =====
The league fixtures were unveiled on 14 June 2023.

14 July 2023 1	Krumovgrad	3–1	Ludogorets Razgrad	Plovdiv (Note: Krumovgrad will host their matches at Sporten kompleks "Nikola Shterev - Starika", Plovdiv, as their own venue, Krumovgrad Stadium, Krumovgrad, does not meet BFU requirements.)
21:00 UTC+3	Katsarov 6'; Kolev 17'; Yusein (yellow card) 53'; Vasilev (yellow card) 67'; Sorakov 68'; Georgiev (yellow card) 78'	Report	Yankov 39'; Terziev (yellow card) 43'	Stadium: Sporten kompleks "Nikola Shterev - Starika"; Attendance: 700; Referee: Nikola Popov (Sofia)

22 July 2023 2	Ludogorets Razgrad	5–0	Etar	Razgrad
21:30 UTC+3	Witry 18'; Yankov 46'; Tekpetey 49', 57'; Duah (penalty missed) 53'; Russo 71'	Report	Dimov (yellow card) 21'; Angelov (red card) 37'	Stadium: Huvepharma Arena; Attendance: 900; Referee: Volen Chinkov (Sofia)

5 August 2023 4	Botev Vratsa	0–5	Ludogorets Razgrad	Vratsa
19:00 UTC+3	Ivaylov (yellow card) 6'; Barbosa (red card) 18'; Mendoza (yellow card) 36'	Report	Rwan Cruz 8'; Witry (yellow card) 45+2', (goal) 64'; Son 48'; Naressi 62'; Gonçalves (yellow card) 69'; Despodov 72'	Stadium: Hristo Botev; Attendance: 700; Referee: Georgi Ginchev (Veliko Tarnovo)

13 August 2023 5	Ludogorets Razgrad	3–0	CSKA Sofia	Razgrad
21:15 UTC+3	Rwan Cruz 8'; Sanyang 33' (o.g.); Tekpetey (yellow card) 55'; Despodov 56' (pen.); Sundberg (red card) 73'; Verdon (yellow card) 83'	Report	Vion (yellow card) 32'; Busatto (yellow card) 55'; Lindseth (yellow card) 58'; Shaghoyan (yellow card) 69'	Stadium: Huvepharma Arena; Attendance: 4,900; Referee: Nikola Popov (Sofia)

20 August 2023 6	Cherno More	1–0	Ludogorets Razgrad	Varna
21:15 UTC+3	Iliev (yellow card) 37'; Panov 56', (yellow card) 65'; Popov (yellow card) 81'; Dyulgerov (yellow card) 89'; Drobarov (yellow card) 90+9'	Report	Heister (yellow card) 34'; Despodov (yellow card) 83'; Plastun (red card) 90+2'; Tissera (red card) 90+6'	Stadium: Ticha; Attendance: 3,900; Referee: Radoslav Gidzhenov (Plovdiv)

27 August 2023 7	Ludogorets Razgrad	5–0	Beroe	Razgrad
21:15 UTC+3	Russo 19'; Tekpetey 30'; Piotrowski 66'; Caio Vidal 74'; Yankov (yellow card) 80'; Delev 84'	Report	Ramos Mingo (yellow card) 82'	Stadium: Huvepharma Arena; Attendance: 856; Referee: Dragomir Draganov (Varna)

16 September 2023 9	Ludogorets Razgrad	2–2	Botev Plovdiv	Razgrad
20:00 UTC+3	Heister (yellow card) 17'; Verdon 43' (pen.); Tekpetey (yellow card) 87'; Russo (yellow card) 90+5'; Piotrowski 90+9'	Report	Karabelyov (yellow card) 44'; Perera (yellow card) 55'; Popov 57', (yellow card) 57'; Kolev 83'; Conte (yellow card) 87'; Kajzer (yellow card) 90'	Stadium: Huvepharma Arena; Attendance: 123; Referee: Krasen Georgiev (Varna)

23 September 2023 10	Lokomotiv Sofia	1–3	Ludogorets Razgrad	Sofia
20:30 UTC+3	Teixeira 12'; Mechev (yellow card) 55'; Lyubenov (yellow card) 62'; Lambese (yellow card) 77'; Krastev (yellow card) 80'	Report	Son (yellow card) 11'; Gonçalves (yellow card) 42', (goal) 67'; Rwan Cruz 59'; Verdon (yellow card) 63'; Caio Vidal 76'	Stadium: Lokomotiv; Attendance: 270; Referee: Volen Chinkov (Sofia)

27 September 2023 11	Ludogorets Razgrad	1–1	Lokomotiv Plovdiv	Razgrad
20:30 UTC+3	Tekpetey 9'; Witry (yellow card) 90+9'	Report	Ewandro (yellow card) 39'; Conteh (yellow card) 45'; Andreev 85'; Horkaš (yellow card) 90+6'; Segura (yellow card) 90+7'; Minchev (yellow card) 90+8'	Stadium: Huvepharma Arena; Attendance: 1,000; Referee: Nikola Popov (Sofia)

1 October 2023 12	Levski Sofia	0–1	Ludogorets Razgrad	Sofia
20:30 UTC+3	Petris (yellow card) 14'; Córdoba (yellow card) 37'; Tsunami (yellow card) 90+2'	Report	Rwan Cruz 25', (yellow card) 61'; Piotrowski (yellow card) 50'; Caio Vidal (yellow card) 58'; Tekpetey (yellow card) 69'; Padt (yellow card) 80'; Gonçalves (yellow card) 83'	Stadium: Vivacom Arena - Georgi Asparuhov; Attendance: 9,472; Referee: Georgi Ginchev (Veliko Tarnovo)

8 October 2023 13	Ludogorets Razgrad	4–0	Pirin Blagoevgrad	Razgrad
20:15 UTC+3	Delev 6'; Piotrowski 61'; Rwan Cruz 65'; Caio Vidal 79'	Report	Tasev (yellow card) 45+4'; Semeniv (yellow card) 79'; Ayoub (yellow card) 80'	Stadium: Huvepharma Arena; Attendance: 680; Referee: Vladimir Valkov (Plovdiv)

22 October 2023 14	Arda	0–0	Ludogorets Razgrad	Kardzhali
19:00 UTC+3	Toungara (yellow card) 53'; Hüseynov (yellow card) 79'; Krachunov (yellow card) 83'	Report	Sundberg (yellow card) 2'; Nedyalkov (yellow card) 21'; Delev (yellow card) 69'	Stadium: Arena Arda; Attendance: 1,697; Referee: Ivaylo Stoyanov (Petrich)

29 October 2023 15	Ludogorets Razgrad	3–1	Hebar	Razgrad
18:15 UTC+3	Tekpetey 11'; Witry 37'; Rick 88'	Report	Tsonkov 86'	Stadium: Huvepharma Arena; Attendance: 580; Referee: Georgi Kabakov (Plovdiv)

2 November 2023 3	Slavia Sofia	0–2	Ludogorets Razgrad	Sofia
17:00 UTC+2	Jelenković (yellow card) 38'	Report	Duah 68', 77'	Stadium: Aleksandar Shalamanov; Attendance: 241; Referee: Radoslav Gidzhenov (Plovdiv)
Note: Originally scheduled for 30 July 2023, the match was postponed by the BFU due to Ludogorets' participation in the UCL.

5 November 2023 16	Ludogorets Razgrad	1–0	Krumovgrad	Razgrad
15:30 UTC+2	Duah 16'	Report	K. Pehlivanov (yellow card) 4'; Raposo (yellow card) 65'; Granado (yellow card) 90+2'	Stadium: Huvepharma Arena; Attendance: 720; Referee: Vasimir El-Hatib (Sofia)

12 November 2023 17	Etar	0–4	Ludogorets Razgrad	Veliko Tarnovo
18:00 UTC+2	Córdova (yellow card) 30' (yellow-red card) 69'	Report	Duah 3'; Nedelev 32'; Piotrowski 37', (yellow card) 74'; Tekpetey 41'	Stadium: Ivaylo; Attendance: 534; Referee: Vladimir Valkov (Plovdiv)

27 November 2023 18	Ludogorets Razgrad	2–3	Slavia Sofia	Razgrad
15:15 UTC+2	Rick 42'; Caio Vidal 67'; Chouiar (yellow card) 82'; Russo (yellow card) 90'; Rwan Cruz (yellow card) 90+5'	Report	Russo 30' (o.g.); Aleksandrov (yellow card) 32'; Sorakov 47'; Ivanov 54'; Martinov (yellow card) 75'; Stoev (yellow card) 80'	Stadium: Huvepharma Arena; Attendance: 163; Referee: Volen Chinkov (Sofia)

3 December 2023 19	Ludogorets Razgrad	5–0	Botev Vratsa	Razgrad
15:15 UTC+2	Duah 20'; Caio Vidal (yellow card) 32'; Son (yellow card) 38'; Piotrowski 56', 59'; Tissera 74'; Nedelev 88'	Report	Mendoza (yellow card) 15'; Majouga (yellow card) 42'; Kunde (yellow card) 90'	Stadium: Huvepharma Arena; Attendance: 560; Referee: Georgi Kabakov (Plovdiv)

10 December 2023 20	CSKA Sofia	0–1	Ludogorets Razgrad	Sofia
17:45 UTC+2	Vion (yellow card) 15'; Carreazo (yellow card) 38'; Córdoba (yellow card) 40'; Busatto (yellow card) 90+21'	Report	Naressi (yellow card) 30'; Caio Vidal (yellow card) 64'; Gonçalves (yellow card) 86'; Delev 90+18'; Padt (yellow card) 90+24'; Rick (yellow card) 90+25'	Stadium: Balgarska Armia; Attendance: 16,183; Referee: Dragomir Draganov (Varna)

19 February 2024 21	Ludogorets Razgrad	3–1	Cherno More	Razgrad
16:00 UTC+2	Rwan Cruz 12', 36'; Piotrowski (yellow card) 22', (goal) 42'; Naressi (yellow card) 44'	Report	Dani Martín 8'; Stefanov (yellow card) 64'	Stadium: Huvepharma Arena; Attendance: 1,744; Referee: Volen Chinkov (Sofia)

26 February 2024 22	Beroe	0–2	Ludogorets Razgrad	Stara Zagora
17:30 UTC+2	Ramos Mingo (yellow card) 29'; Govea (yellow card) 33'; Algarra (yellow card) 45+2'; Accinelli (red card) 46'; Villa (yellow card) 70'; Pachamé (yellow card) 89'	Report	Son 24'; Gonçalves (yellow card) 52'; Rwan Cruz 63'; Tekpetey (yellow card) 70'	Stadium: Beroe; Attendance: 759; Referee: Georgi Ginchev (Veliko Tarnovo)

3 March 2024 23	Ludogorets Razgrad	2–0	CSKA 1948	Razgrad
17:00 UTC+2	Naressi (yellow card) 39'; Witry 42'; Piotrowski 53'; Duah (yellow card) 67'	Report	Daskalov (yellow card) HT	Stadium: Huvepharma Arena; Attendance: 1,344; Referee: Vladimir Valkov (Plovdiv)

10 March 2024 24	Botev Plovdiv	0–2	Ludogorets Razgrad	Plovdiv
17:45 UTC+2	Tamm (yellow card) 42'; Ukaki (yellow card) 62'; Balogiannis (yellow card) 74'; Nikolov (yellow card) 82'; Perera (yellow card) 88'	Report	Duah 13'; Piotrowski 27'	Stadium: Hristo Botev; Attendance: 4,777; Referee: Dragomir Draganov (Varna)

16 March 2024 25	Ludogorets Razgrad	6–0	Lokomotiv Sofia	Razgrad
17:45 UTC+2	Duah 2', 53' (pen.); Chochev 38'; Tekpetey 43'; Rwan Cruz 57'; Witry 88'	Report	Celso (yellow card) 5'; Teixeira (yellow card) 6'; Cardoso (yellow card) 68'	Stadium: Huvepharma Arena; Attendance: 367; Referee: Georgi Davidov (Veliko Tarnovo)

30 March 2024 26	Lokomotiv Plovdiv	1–2	Ludogorets Razgrad	Plovdiv
16:30 UTC+2	Ntelo 36'; Paskalev (yellow card) 52'; Kamdem (yellow card) 78'	Report	Tekpetey 30'; Rick (yellow card) 56'; Caio Vidal (yellow card) 70'; Almeida 90'	Stadium: Lokomotiv; Attendance: 3,222; Referee: Ivaylo Stoyanov (Petrich)

3 April 2024 27	Ludogorets Razgrad	5–1	Levski Sofia	Razgrad
19:30 UTC+3	Rwan Cruz 3', (yellow card) 29'; Piotrowski (yellow card) 39', (goal) 56'; Terziev 47'; Duah 63'; Caio Vidal 90+2'	Report	Petkov 16', (yellow card) 49'; Tsunami (yellow card) 21'; Ohene (yellow card) 28'; Galchev (yellow card) 45+3'; Mihalev (yellow card) 79'	Stadium: Huvepharma Arena; Attendance: 4,577; Referee: Georgi Kabakov (Plovdiv)

7 April 2024 28	Pirin Blagoevgrad	0–2	Ludogorets Razgrad	Blagoevgrad
20:15 UTC+3	Tasev (yellow card) 44'; Popadiyn (yellow card) 90+3'	Report	Bodurov 58' (o.g.); Naressi 74'; Terziev (yellow card) 90+2'	Stadium: Hristo Botev; Attendance: N/A; Referee: Georgi Ginchev (Veliko Tarnovo)

11 April 2024 8	CSKA 1948	0–1	Ludogorets Razgrad	Bistritsa
18:45 UTC+3	Vasilev (yellow card) 11'; Thalis (yellow card) 73'	Report	Almeida (yellow card) 57'; Terziev (yellow card) 64'; Tissera 82'; Padt (yellow card) 90+2'	Stadium: Bistritsa; Attendance: N/A; Referee: Valentin Zhelezov (Burgas)
Note: Originally scheduled for 3 September 2023, the match was postponed by the BFU due to Ludogorets' participation in European competitions.

15 April 2024 29	Ludogorets Razgrad	2–0	Arda	Razgrad
20:00 UTC+3	Duah 30'; Piotrowski 42'; Tekpetey (yellow card) 87'	Report	Mitev (red card) 53'	Stadium: Huvepharma Arena; Attendance: 127; Referee: Nikola Popov (Sofia)

20 April 2024 30	Hebar	0–3	Ludogorets Razgrad	Pazardzhik
17:45 UTC+3	Diamanka (yellow card) 90+3'	Report	Tekpetey 7', 19'; Rick (yellow card) 49'; Son (yellow card) 61'; Rwan Cruz 78'	Stadium: Georgi Benkovski; Attendance: 496; Referee: Dragomir Draganov (Varna)

==== Championship stage ====
===== Table =====
Pos	Team	Pld	W	D	L	GF	GA	GD	Pts	Qualification
1	Ludogorets Razgrad (C)	35	26	4	5	87	24	+63	82	Qualification for the Champions League first qualifying round
2	Cherno More	35	22	9	4	56	26	+30	75	Qualification for the Conference League second qualifying round
3	CSKA Sofia	35	20	7	8	56	27	+29	67	Qualification for the Conference League play-off
4	Levski Sofia	35	19	7	9	50	30	+20	64	
5	Lokomotiv Plovdiv	35	17	7	11	53	44	+9	58	
6	Krumovgrad	35	13	10	12	45	45	0	49	

Source: Soccerway, Bulgarian Football
Rules for classification: 1) Points; 2) Head-to-head points; 3) Head-to-head goal difference; 4) Head-to-head goals scored; 5) Head-to-head away goals scored (only if two teams); 6) Goal difference; 7) Goals scored; 8) Fairplay ranking; 9) Draw.
(C) Champions

===== Results summary =====
Overall								Home						Away					
Pld	W	D	L	GF	GA	GD	Pts	W	D	L	GF	GA	GD	W	D	L	GF	GA	GD
5	2	1	2	9	9	0	7	2	1	0	9	4	+5	0	0	2	0	5	−5

Last updated: 26 May 2024.
Source: See results

===== Results by round =====
Round	1	2	3	4	5
Ground	H	H	A	H	A
Result	D	W	L	W	L
Position	1	1	1	1	1

Source: See Results
A = Away; H = Home; W = Win; D = Draw; L = Loss

===== Matches =====
28 April 2024 31	Ludogorets Razgrad	3–3	Krumovgrad	Razgrad
17:45 UTC+3	Son (yellow card) 45+5'; Rick 49'; Verdon 56' (pen.); Rwan Cruz 75'	Report	Kolev 12', (yellow card) 76'; S. Yusein 26'; Tsvetanov (yellow card) 45+4'; Nedyalkov 89' (o.g.)	Stadium: Huvepharma Arena; Attendance: N/A; Referee: Valentin Zhelezov (Burgas)

11 May 2024 32	Ludogorets Razgrad	3–1	CSKA Sofia	Razgrad
19:30 UTC+3	Duah 2', 57' (pen.), (yellow card) 60'; Nedyalkov 48'; Tekpetey (red card) 60'; Almeida (yellow card) 90+2'	Report	Córdoba (yellow card) 34'; Karanga 34', (red card) 60'; Youga (yellow card) 60' de Nooijer (yellow card) 64'; Asprilla (yellow card) 80'; Carreazo (yellow card) 82'	Stadium: Huvepharma Arena; Attendance: 6,329; Referee: Volen Chinkov (Sofia)

19 May 2024 33	Cherno More	4–0	Ludogorets Razgrad	Varna
20:30 UTC+3	Dimov (yellow card) 37', (goal) 67'; Calcan 43'; Weslen 82'; Atanasov 90'	Report	Almeida (yellow card) 51'	Stadium: Ticha; Attendance: 5,100; Referee: Vladimir Valkov (Plovdiv)

22 May 2024 34	Ludogorets Razgrad	3–0	Lokomotiv Plovdiv	Razgrad
18:30 UTC+3	Rwan Cruz 9', 10'; Duah 33'; Gropper (yellow card) 51'	Report	Paskalev (yellow card) 51'; Pavlov (yellow card) 56'	Stadium: Huvepharma Arena; Attendance: 4,656; Referee: Mariyan Grebencharski (Samokov)

26 May 2024 35	Levski Sofia	1–0	Ludogorets Razgrad	Sofia
18:00 UTC+3	Galchev (yellow card) 10'; Fábio Lima 48'; Chandarov (red card) 84'	Report	Y. Yordanov (yellow card) 66'	Stadium: Vivacom Arena - Georgi Asparuhov; Attendance: 4,777; Referee: Kristiyan Kolev (Plovdiv)

=== Bulgarian Cup ===
22 November 2023 Round of 32	Balkan Botevgrad	0–4	Ludogorets Razgrad	Botevgrad
13:30 UTC+2		Report	Tekpetey 14'; Nedelev 56'; Rwan Cruz 72'; Rick 81'	Stadium: Hristo Botev; Attendance: 1,000; Referee: Stoyan Arsov (Sofia)

6 December 2023 Round of 16	Ludogorets Razgrad	4–0	Lokomotiv Plovdiv	Razgrad
17:30 UTC+2	Caio Vidal 11'; Tekpetey (yellow card) 61'; Gonçalves (yellow card) 73'; Rick 75'; Rwan Cruz 84'; Tissera 90+3'	Report	Segura (yellow card) 32' (yellow-red card) 57'; Ali (yellow card) 35'; Kamdem (yellow card) 77'	Stadium: Huvepharma Arena; Attendance: 300; Referee: Georgi Ginchev (Veliko Tarnovo)

29 February 2024 Quarterfinal	Ludogorets Razgrad	3–1	CSKA 1948	Razgrad
17:30 UTC+2	Nedelev 17', 46'; Rick 81'; Piotrowski (yellow card) 83'	Report	Vasilev (yellow card) 11'; Pedrinho 57'; Daskalov (yellow card) 86'	Stadium: Huvepharma Arena; Attendance: N/A; Referee: Valentin Zhelezov (Burgas)

24 April 2024 Semifinal 1st leg	Ludogorets Razgrad	4–0	Hebar	Razgrad
18:45 UTC+3	Rick 4', 21'; Tekpetey (yellow card) 32'; Almeida 55'; Delev 80'	Report	Isuf (yellow card) 62'	Stadium: Huvepharma Arena; Attendance: 498; Referee: Vladimir Valkov (Plovdiv)

2 May 2024 Semifinal 2nd leg	Hebar	0–5 (0–9 agg.)	Ludogorets Razgrad	Pazardzhik
18:45 UTC+3	Zbun (yellow card) 58'	Report	Chochev 5'; Caio Vidal 22'; Gonçalves 44'; Tissera 75'; Sundberg 90'	Stadium: Georgi Benkovski; Attendance: 230; Referee: Georgi Ginchev (Veliko Tarnovo)

15 May 2024 Final	Ludogorets Razgrad	2–3	Botev Plovdiv	Sofia
19:00 UTC+3	Duah 8'; Piotrowski (yellow card) 10'; Caio Vidal (yellow card) 36'; Rwan Cruz 71', (penalty missed) 90+11'; Naressi (yellow card) 77'	Report	Conte 4', (yellow card) 90+10'; Minkov (yellow card) 40'; Sekulić 45'; Umeh 58'; Eto'o (yellow card) 77'; Brahimi (yellow card) 77'	Stadium: Natsionalen stadion Vasil Levski; Attendance: 11,334; Referee: Dragomir Draganov (Varna)

=== Bulgarian Supercup ===
10 February 2024	Ludogorets Razgrad	1–1 (4–2 p)	CSKA 1948	Veliko Tarnovo
15:00 UTC+2	Verdon 9' (pen.); Tekpetey (yellow card) 15'; Caio Vidal (yellow card) 53'; Piotrowski (yellow card) 59'; Witry (yellow card) 60'	Report	Johnathan (yellow card) 8' (yellow-red card) 48'; Chochev (yellow card) 36'; Viyachki (yellow card) 45+1'; Vasilev (yellow card) 54'; Piščević 62'; Vutov (yellow card) 64'; Bidounga (yellow card) 89'	Stadium: Ivaylo; Attendance: 1,344; Referee: Georgi Kabakov (Plovdiv)
	Penalties
	Duah (penalty scored); Nedelev (penalty scored); Piotrowski (penalty missed); Witry (penalty scored); Verdon (penalty scored)		(penalty scored) Pedrinho; (penalty missed) Karagaren; (penalty scored) Tsenov; (penalty missed) Daskalov

=== UEFA Champions League ===
==== Qualifying rounds ====
11 July 2023 First qualifying round 1st leg	Ballkani (Kosovo)	2–0	(Bulgaria) Ludogorets Razgrad	Pristina, Kosovo (Note: Ballkani played their home match at the Fadil Vokrri Stadium in Pristina, instead of their regular stadium, the Theranda City Stadium in Suva Reka, which did not meet UEFA requirements.)
20:45 UTC+2	Trashi (yellow card) 43'; Korenica 45+1'; Zyba 55'; Thaqi (yellow card) 90+3'	Report	Plastun (yellow card) 19'	Stadium: Fadil Vokrri Stadium; Attendance: 7,656; Referee: Gal Leibovitz (Israel)

19 July 2023 First qualifying round 2nd leg	Ludogorets Razgrad (Bulgaria)	4–0 (4–2 agg.)	(Kosovo) Ballkani	Razgrad, Bulgaria
21:00 UTC+3	Tekpetey 4', 45+1'; Tissera 49'; Heister (yellow card) 51'; Russo (yellow card) 58'; Gonçalves (yellow card) 69'; Caio Vidal 78', (yellow card) 78'	Report	Kryeziu (yellow card) 59'	Stadium: Huvepharma Arena; Attendance: 5,353; Referee: Luca Pairetto (Italy)

26 July 2023 Second qualifying round 1st leg	Ludogorets Razgrad (Bulgaria)	1–1	(Slovenia) Olimpija Ljubljana	Razgrad, Bulgaria
21:45 UTC+3	Yankov 44'; Naressi (yellow card) 73'; Witry (yellow card) 90+4'	Report	Elšnik 14'; Posavec (yellow card) 22'; Doffo (yellow card) 62'; Nukić (yellow card) 65'; Sualehe (yellow card) 90+4'; Motika (yellow card) 90+4'	Stadium: Huvepharma Arena; Attendance: 5,532; Referee: Rohit Saggi (Norway)

1 August 2023 Second qualifying round 2nd leg	Olimpija Ljubljana (Slovenia)	2–1 (3–2 agg.)	(Bulgaria) Ludogorets Razgrad	Ljubljana, Slovenia
20:00 UTC+2	Elšnik (yellow card) 7', (goal) 18', 90+2'; Nukić (yellow card) 12'; Doffo (yellow card) 14'; Silva (yellow card) 87'	Report	Despodov 15', (penalty missed) 90+12'; Heister (yellow card) 18'; Naressi (yellow card) 48'; Son (red card) 82'; Piotrowski (yellow card) 90+11'	Stadium: Stožice Stadium; Attendance: 9,265; Referee: Christian Dingert (Germany)

=== UEFA Europa League ===
==== Qualifying rounds ====
8 August 2023 Third qualifying round 1st leg	Astana (Kazakhstan)	2–1	(Bulgaria) Ludogorets Razgrad	Astana, Kazakhstan
20:00 UTC+6	Tomašević 40', (yellow card) 90+3'; Lončar (yellow card) 47'; Marochkin 53'; Beysebekov (yellow card) 66'	Report	Sundberg 34'; Gonçalves (yellow card) 47'; Verdon (yellow card) 87'	Stadium: Astana Arena; Attendance: 23,967; Referee: Horațiu Feșnic (Romania)

17 August 2023 Third qualifying round 2nd leg	Ludogorets Razgrad (Bulgaria)	5–1 (6–3 agg.)	(Kazakhstan) Astana	Razgrad, Bulgaria
21:00 UTC+3	Tekpetey 25', 50'; Piotrowski 47', 58'; Gonçalves (yellow card) 54'; Despodov 67'	Report	Ebong (yellow card) 27'; Darboe 29'; Aymbetov (yellow card) 34'; Jovančić (yellow card) 43' (yellow-red card) 76'	Stadium: Huvepharma Arena; Attendance: 5,469; Referee: Anthony Taylor (England)

24 August 2023 Play-off round 1st leg	Ludogorets Razgrad (Bulgaria)	1–4	(Netherlands) Ajax	Razgrad, Bulgaria
21:00 UTC+3	Verdon 70' (pen.)	Report	Kudus 16', 18', 50'; Brobbey 40'; Medić (yellow card) 81'	Stadium: Huvepharma Arena; Attendance: 9,880; Referee: Marco Di Bello (Italy)

31 August 2023 Play-off round 2nd leg	Ajax (Netherlands)	0–1 (4–2 agg.)	(Bulgaria) Ludogorets Razgrad	Amsterdam, Netherlands
20:00 UTC+2	Bergwijn (yellow card) 45'; Taylor (yellow card) 56'; Berghuis (yellow card) 74'	Report	Heister (yellow card) 55'; Tissera 62'; Gonçalves (yellow card) 71'	Stadium: Johan Cruyff Arena; Attendance: 50,900; Referee: Ivan Kružliak (Slovakia)

=== UEFA Europa Conference League ===
==== Group stage ====
Pos	Team	Pld	W	D	L	GF	GA	GD	Pts	Qualification
1	(Turkey) Fenerbahçe	6	4	0	2	13	11	+2	12 (Note: Tied on head-to-head results. Overall goal difference used as a tiebreaker.)	Advance to round of 16
2	(Bulgaria) Ludogorets Razgrad	6	4	0	2	11	11	0	12	Advance to knockout round play-offs
3	(Denmark) Nordsjælland	6	3	1	2	17	7	+10	10	
4	(Slovakia) Spartak Trnava	6	0	1	5	3	15	−12	1	

Source: UEFA
Rules for classification: Group stage tiebreakers
Notes:

21 September 2023 1	Ludogorets Razgrad (Bulgaria)	4–0	(Slovakia) Spartak Trnava	Razgrad, Bulgaria
19:45 UTC+3	Gonçalves (yellow card) 40'; Son (yellow card) 44'; Yordanov 46'; Piotrowski 50', 63'; Rwan Cruz 90+4'	Report	Zeljković (yellow card) 5'; Mikovič (yellow card) 74'; Procházka (yellow card) 89'	Stadium: Huvepharma Arena; Attendance: 6,358; Referee: Genc Nuza (Kosovo)

5 October 2023 2	Nordsjælland (Denmark)	7–1	(Bulgaria) Ludogorets Razgrad	Farum, Denmark
21:00 UTC+2	Ingvartsen 2' (pen.); Osman 11'; Tverskov 31'; Nygren 32', 74'; Son 68' (o.g.); Rasmussen 86'	Report	Verdon 9' (pen.); Caio Vidal (yellow card) 40'; Witry (yellow card) 54'; Piotrowski (yellow card) 63'	Stadium: Right to Dream Park; Attendance: 4,069; Referee: Juxhin Xhaja (Albania)

26 October 2023 3	Fenerbahçe (Turkey)	3–1	(Bulgaria) Ludogorets Razgrad	Istanbul, Turkey
19:45 UTC+3	Batshuayi 42'; Djiku (yellow card) 50'; Zajc 52', 90+3'; Becão (yellow card) 56'; Crespo (yellow card) 79'	Report	Naressi (yellow card) 42'; Tekpetey (yellow card) 48'; Becão 65' (o.g.); Piotrowski (yellow card) 75'; Nedyalkov (yellow card) 90+3'; Delev (yellow card) 90+3'	Stadium: Şükrü Saracoğlu; Attendance: 35,595; Referee: Guillermo Cuadra Fernández (Spain)

9 November 2023 4	Ludogorets Razgrad (Bulgaria)	2–0	(Turkey) Fenerbahçe	Razgrad, Bulgaria
22:00 UTC+2	Piotrowski 18'; Nedyalkov (yellow card) 32'; Gonçalves (yellow card) 39'; Caio Vidal (yellow card) 63'; Russo (yellow card) 71'; Rwan Cruz 90+2'	Report	Crespo (yellow card) 38'; Zajc (yellow card) 45+1'; Oosterwolde (yellow card) 49'; Kahveci (yellow card) 77'	Stadium: Huvepharma Arena; Attendance: 10,363; Referee: Ondřej Berka (Czech Republic)

30 November 2023 5	Spartak Trnava (Slovakia)	1–2	(Bulgaria) Ludogorets Razgrad	Trnava, Slovakia
21:00 UTC+1	Daniel 78'; Koštrna (yellow card) 80'; Mikovič (yellow card) 88'	Report	Naressi (yellow card) 57'; Duah 74'; Verdon (penalty missed) 86'; Caio Vidal (yellow card) 90+2'; Tissera 90+5'	Stadium: Anton Malatinský; Attendance: 10,158; Referee: Vitālijs Spasjoņņikovs (Latvia)

14 December 2023 6	Ludogorets Razgrad (Bulgaria)	1–0	(Denmark) Nordsjælland	Razgrad, Bulgaria
19:45 UTC+2	Tekpetey (yellow card) 6'; Sundberg (yellow card) 32'; Piotrowski 79'; Tissera (yellow card) 83'; Yordanov (yellow card) 90+7'; Delev (yellow card) 90+8'	Report	Nygren (yellow card) 17'; Frese (yellow card) 48'	Stadium: Huvepharma Arena; Attendance: 6,464; Referee: Ovidiu Hațegan (Romania)

==== Knockout phase ====
15 February 2024 KO round play-offs 1st leg	Servette (Switzerland)	0–0	(Bulgaria) Ludogorets Razgrad	Geneva, Switzerland
21:00 UTC+1	Mazikou (yellow card) 25'; Ondoua (yellow card) 37'; Guillemenot (yellow card) 54'	Report	Sundberg (yellow card) 81'	Stadium: Stade de Genève; Attendance: 13,847; Referee: Filip Glova (Slovakia)

22 February 2024 KO round play-offs 2nd leg	Ludogorets Razgrad (Bulgaria)	0–1 (0–1 agg.)	(Switzerland) Servette	Razgrad, Bulgaria
19:45 UTC+2	Caio Vidal (yellow card) 13'; Piotrowski (yellow card) 77'; Son (yellow card) 89'	Report	Cognat (yellow card) 5', (goal) 6'; Bolla (yellow card) 31'; Mazikou (yellow card) 54'	Stadium: Huvepharma Arena; Attendance: 6,417; Referee: Aliyar Aghayev (Azerbaijan)

== Squad statistics ==
As of 1 October 2023

=== Appearances and goals ===
No.	Pos	Nat	Player	Total		First League		Bulgarian Cup		Bulgarian Supercup		Champions League		Europa League		Conference League	
No.	Pos	Nat	Player	Apps	Goals	Apps	Goals	Apps	Goals	Apps	Goals	Apps	Goals	Apps	Goals	Apps	Goals
1	GK	(Netherlands) NED	Sergio Padt	8	0	2	0	0	0	0	0	4	0	2	0	0	0
3	DF	(Bulgaria) BUL	Anton Nedyalkov	0	0	0	0	0	0	0	0	0	0	0	0	0	0
5	DF	(Bulgaria) BUL	Georgi Terziev	2	0	1+1	0	0	0	0	0	0	0	0	0	0	0
6	MF	(Poland) POL	Jakub Piotrowski	16	6	8	2	0	0	0	0	2+1	0	4	2	1	2
7	FW	(Brazil) BRA	Rick	11	0	2+6	0	0	0	0	0	0+1	0	0+2	0	0	0
8	MF	(Portugal) POR	Claude Gonçalves	17	1	5+3	1	0	0	0	0	4	0	4	0	1	0
9	FW	(Switzerland) SUI	Kwadwo Duah	2	0	1	0	0	0	0	0	1	0	0	0	0	0
10	FW	(Argentina) ARG	Matías Tissera	9	2	0+2	0	0	0	0	0	3+1	1	0+2	1	1	0
11	FW	(France) FRA	Mounir Chouiar	3	0	0+2	0	0	0	0	0	0	0	0	0	0+1	0
12	GK	(Croatia) CRO	Simon Sluga	11	0	8	0	0	0	0	0	0	0	2	0	1	0
14	DF	(Israel) ISR	Denny Gropper	0	0	0	0	0	0	0	0	0	0	0	0	0	0
16	DF	(Norway) NOR	Aslak Fonn Witry	17	2	7+1	2	0	0	0	0	3+1	0	4	0	1	0
17	DF	(Spain) ESP	Son	11	1	7+2	1	0	0	0	0	1	0	0	0	1	0
22	DF	(Argentina) ARG	Franco Russo	11	2	4+2	2	0	0	0	0	4	0	1	0	0	0
24	DF	(Benin) BEN	Olivier Verdon	15	2	8	1	0	0	0	0	1+1	0	4	1	1	0
26	DF	(The Gambia) GAM	Noah Sonko Sundberg	10	1	5	0	0	0	0	0	0	0	4	1	1	0
30	MF	(Brazil) BRA	Pedro Naressi	19	1	5+5	1	0	0	0	0	1+3	0	0+4	0	0+1	0
32	DF	(Ukraine) UKR	Ihor Plastun	7	0	2+1	0	0	0	0	0	3	0	0+1	0	0	0
37	FW	(Ghana) GHA	Bernard Tekpetey	16	8	8+1	4	0	0	0	0	3	2	3	2	1	0
44	DF	(Germany) GER	Marcel Heister	14	0	4+2	0	0	0	0	0	4	0	4	0	0	0
61	DF	(Portugal) POR	Dinis Almeida	0	0	0	0	0	0	0	0	0	0	0	0	0	0
64	MF	(Bulgaria) BUL	Dominik Yankov	14	3	4+2	2	0	0	0	0	3+1	1	0+3	0	0+1	0
77	FW	(Brazil) BRA	Caio Vidal	18	3	6+3	2	0	0	0	0	1+3	1	1+3	0	1	0
82	MF	(Bulgaria) BUL	Ivan Yordanov	15	1	8+1	0	0	0	0	0	0+2	0	2+1	0	1	1
88	MF	(Bulgaria) BUL	Todor Nedelev	2	0	1+1	0	0	0	0	0	0	0	0	0	0	0
90	FW	(Bulgaria) BUL	Spas Delev	19	1	3+7	1	0	0	0	0	0+4	0	0+4	0	0+1	0
99	FW	(Brazil) BRA	Rwan Cruz	13	5	8	4	0	0	0	0	0	0	4	0	0+1	1
Players from the reserve team:
18	FW	(Brazil) BRA	Raí	2	0	1	0	0	0	0	0	0+1	0	0	0	0	0
Players away on loan:
2	DF	(Spain) ESP	Pipa	2	0	1	0	0	0	0	0	0+1	0	0	0	0	0
20	MF	(Brazil) BRA	Nonato	3	0	0+2	0	0	0	0	0	1	0	0	0	0	0
21	DF	(Slovenia) SLO	Žan Karničnik	0	0	0	0	0	0	0	0	0	0	0	0	0	0
38	FW	(Bulgaria) BUL	Vladislav Naydenov	0	0	0	0	0	0	0	0	0	0	0	0	0	0
51	DF	(Bulgaria) BUL	Ilker Budinov	0	0	0	0	0	0	0	0	0	0	0	0	0	0
67	GK	(Bulgaria) BUL	Damyan Hristov	0	0	0	0	0	0	0	0	0	0	0	0	0	0
Players that left during the season:
11	FW	(Bulgaria) BUL	Kiril Despodov	11	4	1+3	2	0	0	0	0	4	1	3	1	0	0
23	MF	(Angola) ANG	Show	2	0	0+1	0	0	0	0	0	1	0	0	0	0	0

=== Goalscorers ===
Place	Position	Nation	Number	Name	First League	Bulgarian Cup	Bulgarian Supercup	Champions League	Europa League	Conference League	Total
1	FW	(Ghana)	37	Bernard Tekpetey	4	0	0	2	2	0	8
2	MF	(Poland)	6	Jakub Piotrowski	2	0	0	0	2	2	6
3	FW	(Brazil)	99	Rwan Cruz	4	0	0	0	0	1	5
4	FW	(Bulgaria)	11	Kiril Despodov †	2	0	0	1	1	0	4
5	FW	(Brazil)	77	Caio Vidal	2	0	0	1	0	0	3
5	MF	(Bulgaria)	64	Dominik Yankov	2	0	0	1	0	0	3
7	DF	(Argentina)	22	Franco Russo	2	0	0	0	0	0	2
7	FW	(Argentina)	10	Matías Tissera	0	0	0	1	1	0	2
7	DF	(Benin)	24	Olivier Verdon	1	0	0	0	1	0	2
7	DF	(Norway)	16	Aslak Fonn Witry	2	0	0	0	0	0	2
11	FW	(Bulgaria)	90	Spas Delev	1	0	0	0	0	0	1
11	MF	(Portugal)	8	Claude Gonçalves	1	0	0	0	0	0	1
11	MF	(Brazil)	30	Pedro Naressi	1	0	0	0	0	0	1
11	DF	(Spain)	17	Son	1	0	0	0	0	0	1
11	DF	(The Gambia)	26	Noah Sonko Sundberg	0	0	0	0	1	0	1
11	MF	(Bulgaria)	82	Ivan Yordanov	0	0	0	0	0	1	1
11				Own goal	1	0	0	0	0	0	1
Totals					26	0	0	6	8	4	44

^{†} Player left the club during the season.

=== Clean sheets ===
Place	Position	Nation	Number	Name	First League	Bulgarian Cup	Bulgarian Supercup	Champions League	Europa League	Conference League	Total
1	GK	(Croatia)	12	Simon Sluga	3	0	0	0	1	1	5
2	GK	(Netherlands)	1	Sergio Padt	2	0	0	1	0	0	3
Totals					5	0	0	1	1	1	8

=== Disciplinary record ===
Number	Nation	Position	Name	First League		Bulgarian Cup		Bulgarian Supercup		Champions League		Europa League		Conference League		Total	
Number	Nation	Position	Name	Yellow card	Red card	Yellow card	Red card	Yellow card	Red card	Yellow card	Red card	Yellow card	Red card	Yellow card	Red card	Yellow card	Red card
1	(Netherlands)	GK	Sergio Padt	1	0	0	0	0	0	0	0	0	0	0	0	1	0
5	(Bulgaria)	DF	Georgi Terziev	1	0	0	0	0	0	0	0	0	0	0	0	1	0
6	(Poland)	MF	Jakub Piotrowski	1	0	0	0	0	0	1	0	0	0	0	0	2	0
8	(Portugal)	MF	Claude Gonçalves	3	0	0	0	0	0	1	0	3	0	1	0	8	0
10	(Argentina)	FW	Matías Tissera	0	1	0	0	0	0	0	0	0	0	0	0	0	1
16	(Norway)	DF	Aslak Fonn Witry	2	0	0	0	0	0	1	0	0	0	0	0	3	0
17	(Spain)	DF	Son	1	0	0	0	0	0	0	1	0	0	1	0	2	1
22	(Argentina)	DF	Franco Russo	1	0	0	0	0	0	1	0	0	0	0	0	2	0
26	(The Gambia)	DF	Noah Sonko Sundberg	0	1	0	0	0	0	0	0	0	0	0	0	0	1
24	(Benin)	DF	Olivier Verdon	2	0	0	0	0	0	0	0	1	0	0	0	3	0
30	(Brazil)	MF	Pedro Naressi	0	0	0	0	0	0	2	0	0	0	0	0	2	0
32	(Ukraine)	DF	Ihor Plastun	0	1	0	0	0	0	1	0	0	0	0	0	1	1
37	(Ghana)	FW	Bernard Tekpetey	3	0	0	0	0	0	0	0	0	0	0	0	3	0
44	(Germany)	DF	Marcel Heister	2	0	0	0	0	0	2	0	1	0	0	0	5	0
64	(Bulgaria)	MF	Dominik Yankov	1	0	0	0	0	0	0	0	0	0	0	0	1	0
77	(Brazil)	FW	Caio Vidal	1	0	0	0	0	0	1	0	0	0	0	0	2	0
99	(Brazil)	FW	Rwan Cruz	1	0	0	0	0	0	0	0	0	0	0	0	1	0
Players away on loan:
Players who left during the season:
11	(Bulgaria)	FW	Kiril Despodov	1	0	0	0	0	0	0	0	0	0	0	0	1	0
			Totals	21	3	0	0	0	0	10	1	5	0	2	0	38	4
