= Francisco Venegas =

Francisco Venegas may refer to:

- Francisco Venegas (painter) (c. 1525–1594), Spanish painter
- Francisco Javier Venegas (1754–1838), Spanish general
- Francisco Venegas (footballer) (born 1998), Mexican football defender
