= Luis Vargas =

Luis Vargas may refer to:

- Luis Vargas (musician) (born 1961), Bachata musician from Dominican Republic
- Luis de Vargas (1502–1568), Renaissance painter from Seville, Spain
- Luis Vargas (gymnast) (born 1983), Puerto Rican gymnast
- Luis Vargas Rosas, Chilean painter
