= 2020–21 Levante UD season =

Levante
2020–21 season
- President: Quico Catalán
- Head coach: Paco López
- Stadium: Estadi Ciutat de València
- La Liga: 14th
- Copa del Rey: Semi-finals
- Top goalscorer: League: José Luis Morales (13); All: José Luis Morales (14)
- Biggest win: Racing Murcia 0–5 Levante
- Biggest defeat: Levante 1–5 Villarreal
Home colours	Away colours	Third colours

The 2020–21 season was the 82nd season in the existence of Levante UD and the club's fourth consecutive season in the top flight of Spanish football. In addition to the domestic league, Levante participated in this season's edition of the Copa del Rey. The season covered the period from 20 July 2020 to 30 June 2021, with the late start to the season due to the COVID-19 pandemic in Spain.

== Players ==
=== First-team squad ===
As of 1 February 2021

Note: Flags indicate national team as defined under FIFA eligibility rules; some limited exceptions apply. Players may hold more than one non-FIFA nationality.

No.	Pos.	Nation	Player
2	DF	ESP	Son
3	DF	ESP	Toño
4	DF	ESP	Róber Pier
5	MF	SRB	Nemanja Radoja
6	DF	CRC	Óscar Duarte
7	FW	ESP	Sergio León
9	FW	ESP	Roger Martí
10	MF	MKD	Enis Bardhi
11	FW	ESP	José Luis Morales (captain)
12	MF	MTQ	Mickaël Malsa
13	GK	ESP	Aitor Fernández
14	DF	POR	Rúben Vezo

No.	Pos.	Nation	Player
15	DF	ESP	Sergio Postigo (Vice-captain)
16	MF	ESP	Rubén Rochina
17	MF	MNE	Nikola Vukčević
18	FW	ESP	Jorge de Frutos
19	DF	ESP	Carlos Clerc
20	DF	ESP	Jorge Miramón
21	FW	ESP	Dani Gómez
22	MF	ESP	Gonzalo Melero
23	DF	ESP	Coke
24	MF	ESP	José Campaña
25	MF	CIV	Cheick Doukouré
34	GK	ESP	Daniel Cárdenas

=== Reserve team ===
Note: Flags indicate national team as defined under FIFA eligibility rules; some limited exceptions apply. Players may hold more than one non-FIFA nationality.

No.	Pos.	Nation	Player
42	MF	ESP	Álex Blesa
43	MF	GEO	Giorgi Kochorashvili

No.	Pos.	Nation	Player
44	FW	RUS	Edgar Sevikyan

=== Out on loan ===
Note: Flags indicate national team as defined under FIFA eligibility rules; some limited exceptions apply. Players may hold more than one non-FIFA nationality.

No.	Pos.	Nation	Player
—	GK	ESP	Koke Vegas (at RCD Mallorca until 30 June 2021)
—	MF	ESP	Arturo Molina (at Castellón until 30 June 2021)
—	MF	ESP	Pablo Martínez (at Mirandés until 30 June 2021)

No.	Pos.	Nation	Player
—	MF	ESP	Pepelu (at Vitória Guimarães until 30 June 2021)
—	FW	POR	Hernâni (at Al Wehda until 30 June 2021)

== Transfers ==
=== In ===
Date	Player	From	Type	Fee	Ref
21 July 2020	(Ivory Coast) Cheick Doukouré	Huesca	Loan return		
21 July 2020	(Spain) Ivi	Ponferradina	Loan return		
21 July 2020	(Spain) Antonio Luna	Rayo Vallecano	Loan return		
21 July 2020	(Spain) Fran Manzanara	Ponferradina	Loan return		
21 July 2020	(Albania) Armando Sadiku	Málaga	Loan return		
27 July 2020	(Spain) Pepelu	(Portugal) Tondela	Loan return		
4 August 2020	(Spain) Jorge de Frutos	Real Madrid B	Transfer	€2.5M	
4 August 2020	(Spain) Dani Gómez	Real Madrid B	Transfer	€2.5M	
4 August 2020	(Martinique) Mickaël Malsa	Mirandés	Transfer	Free	
4 August 2020	(Spain) Son	Ponferradina	Transfer	Free	
17 August 2020	(Ghana) Raphael Dwamena	Zaragoza	Loan return		

=== Out ===
Date	Player	To	Type	Fee	Ref
20 July 2020	(Spain) Borja Mayoral	Real Madrid	Loan return		
4 August 2020	(Nigeria) Moses Simon	(France) Nantes	Buyout clause	€5M	
11 August 2020	(Spain) Bruno González	Valladolid	Transfer	Free	
20 August 2020	(Ghana) Raphael Dwamena	(Denmark) Vejle BK	Transfer	Free	
1 September 2020	(Spain) Ivi	(Poland) Raków Częstochowa	Transfer	Free	
5 September 2020	(Albania) Armando Sadiku	(Turkey) BB Erzurumspor	Transfer	Free	
8 September 2020	(Spain) Pepelu	(Portugal) Vitória Guimarães	Loan		
2 October 2020	(Spain) Pablo Martínez	Mirandés	Loan		
4 October 2020	(Spain) Fran Manzanara	Numancia	Transfer	Free	
5 October 2020	(Spain) Arturo Molina	Castellón	Loan		
1 February 2021	(Spain) Koke Vegas	Mallorca	Loan		

== Pre-season and friendlies ==
Win Draw Loss

22 August 2020 Friendly	Albacete	Cancelled	Levante	Albacete, Spain
19:30 CEST (UTC+2)				Stadium: Estadio Carlos Belmonte

27 August 2020 Friendly	Levante	2–1	Mallorca	San Pedro del Pinatar, Spain
21:00 CEST (UTC+2)	De Frutos 2'; Melero 22'; Radoja (yellow card) 71'	Report	Sastre (yellow card) 25'; Sevilla 34'	Stadium: Pinatar Arena; Referee: Rafael Sánchez López

29 August 2020 Friendly	Levante	0–0	Valencia	San Pedro del Pinatar, Spain
19:00 CEST (UTC+2)	Coke (yellow card) 89'		Račić (yellow card) 90+1'	Stadium: Pinatar Arena; Attendance: 0 Referee: Rafael Sánchez López

2 September 2020 Friendly	Levante	2–1	Cartagena	San Pedro del Pinatar, Spain
19:30 CEST (UTC+2)				Stadium: Pinatar Arena

5 September 2020 Friendly	Villarreal	1–2	Levante	Villarreal, Spain
20:30 CEST (UTC+2)	Alcácer 29'	Report	León 34'; Morales 62'	Stadium: Ciudad Deportiva; Attendance: 0 Referee: Miguel Bosch Doménech

6 September 2020 Friendly	Levante	1–0	Castellón	Buñol, Spain
19:30 CEST (UTC+2)	Coke 11'	Report		Stadium: Ciudad Deportiva de Buñol; Attendance: 0 Referee: Andrés Fuentes Molina

15 September 2020 Friendly	Sevilla	3–2	Levante	San Pedro del Pinatar, Spain
18:00 CEST (UTC+2)	Ocampos 59'; En-Nesyri 71'; Rakitić 90+5'	Report	Postigo 14'; Gómez 23'	Stadium: Pinatar Arena; Attendance: 0 Referee: José David Martínez Montalbán

== Competitions ==
=== Overview ===
Competition	First match	Last match	Starting round	Final position	Record							
Competition	First match	Last match	Starting round	Final position	Pld	W	D	L	GF	GA	GD	Win %
La Liga	13 September 2020	21 May 2021	Matchday 1	14th	38	9	14	15	46	57	−11	23.68
Copa del Rey	16 December 2020	4 March 2021	First round	Semi-finals	7	4	2	1	15	7	+8	57.14
Total					45	13	16	16	61	64	−3	28.89

Source: Soccerway

=== La Liga ===
==== League table ====
Pos	Team	Pld	W	D	L	GF	GA	GD	Pts
12	Cádiz	38	11	11	16	36	58	−22	44 (Note: Osasuna finished ahead of Cádiz on head-to-head points: Cádiz 0–2 Osasuna, Osasuna 3–2 Cádiz.)
13	Valencia	38	10	13	15	50	53	−3	43
14	Levante	38	9	14	15	46	57	−11	41
15	Getafe	38	9	11	18	28	43	−15	38
16	Alavés	38	9	11	18	36	57	−21	38

Source: La Liga
Rules for classification: 1) Points; 2) Head-to-head points; 3) Head-to-head goal difference; 4) Goal difference; 5) Goals scored; 6) Fair-play points (Note: Head-to-head record is used only after all the matches between the teams in question have been played)

==== Results summary ====
Overall								Home						Away					
Pld	W	D	L	GF	GA	GD	Pts	W	D	L	GF	GA	GD	W	D	L	GF	GA	GD
38	9	14	15	46	57	−11	41	5	9	5	27	30	−3	4	5	10	19	27	−8

Source: La Liga

==== Results by round ====
Round	1	2	3	4	5	6	7	8	9	10	11	12	13	14	15	16	17	18	19	20	21	22	23	24	25	26	27	28	29	30	31	32	33	34	35	36	37	38
Ground	A	H	A	A	H	A	H	A	H	H	A	H	A	H	A	H	A	H	A	H	A	H	H	A	H	A	H	A	H	A	H	A	H	A	A	H	A	H
Result	L	D	W	L	L	L	D	D	D	D	D	W	L	W	D	W	L	W	D	D	W	D	L	W	D	L	W	L	L	W	L	L	L	L	D	D	L	D
Position	18	18	12	13	18	20	19	18	18	18	19	17	18	15	15	11	13	11	12	12	9	9	11	8	9	11	9	10	11	9	11	12	12	13	14	13	14	14

Source: La Liga
A = Away; H = Home; W = Win; D = Draw; L = Loss

==== Matches ====
The league fixtures were announced on 31 August 2020.

13 September 2020 1	Valencia	4–2	Levante	Valencia
21:00 CEST (UTC+2)	Gabriel 12'; Gómez 39'; Vallejo 75', 90+4'; Račić (yellow card) 89'	Report	Morales 1', 36'; Radoja (yellow card) 52'; Róber (yellow card) 63'; Koke (yellow card) 90+5'	Stadium: Mestalla; Attendance: 0 (Note: The match was played behind closed doors due to the COVID-19 pandemic in Spain.); Referee: José María Sánchez Martínez

27 September 2020 3	Osasuna	1–3	Levante	Pamplona
12:00 CEST (UTC+2)	Torres 38'; Vidal (yellow card) 74'; Torró (yellow card) 90+2'	Report	Melero 41'; Roger (penalty missed) 71', 77'; Morales 81'	Stadium: El Sadar Stadium; Attendance: 0 Referee: Mario Melero López

1 October 2020 4	Sevilla	1–0	Levante	Seville
19:00 CEST (UTC+2)	Navas (yellow card) 51'; Ocampos (yellow card) 78'; Koundé (yellow card) 82'; Fernando (yellow card) 83'; Diego Carlos (yellow card) 90'; En-Nesyri 90+2'	Report	Vezo (yellow card) 38'; Son (yellow card) 76'	Stadium: Ramón Sánchez Pizjuán; Attendance: 0 Referee: Xavier Estrada Fernández

4 October 2020 5	Levante	0–2	Real Madrid	Villarreal
16:00 CEST (UTC+2)	Bardhi (yellow card) 72'; Miramón (yellow card) 90+3'	Report	Casemiro (yellow card) 4'; Vinícius 16'; Benzema 90+5'	Stadium: Estadio de la Cerámica; Attendance: 0 Referee: José Luis Munuera Montero

18 October 2020 6	Athletic Bilbao	2–0	Levante	Bilbao
14:00 CEST (UTC+2)	Álvarez (yellow card) 42'; Capa (yellow card) 44'; López (yellow card) 64'; Berenguer 68'; Williams 79'	Report	Vezo (yellow card) 33'	Stadium: San Mamés; Attendance: 0 Referee: Javier Alberola Rojas

26 October 2020 7	Levante	1–1	Celta Vigo	Villarreal
21:00 CET (UTC+1)	Duarte (yellow card) 31'; Roger 48' (pen.); Toño (yellow card) 78'	Report	Murillo (yellow card) 26'; Olaza (yellow card) 42'; Carreira 52'	Stadium: Estadio de la Cerámica; Attendance: 0 Referee: Mario Melero López

1 November 2020 8	Granada	1–1	Levante	Granada
18:30 CET (UTC+1)	Machís 8'; Gonalons (red card) 16'; Germán (yellow card) 68'; Suárez (yellow card) 69'	Report	Vezo 34', (yellow card) 61'; Malsa (yellow card) 35'; Postigo (yellow card) 47'	Stadium: Nuevo Los Cármenes; Attendance: 0 Referee: Santiago Jaime Latre

8 November 2020 9	Levante	1–1	Alavés	Valencia
18:30 CET (UTC+1)	Morales 51'; Clerc (yellow card) 90+4'	Report	Pérez 4'; Pina (yellow card) 10'; Méndez (yellow card) 24' (yellow-red card) 34'; Battaglia (yellow card) 78'; Rioja (yellow card) 81'; Pacheco (yellow card) 83'	Stadium: Ciutat de València; Attendance: 0 Referee: Isidro Díaz de Mera Escuderos

21 November 2020 10	Levante	1–1	Elche	Valencia
14:00 CET (UTC+1)	Melero 12'; Clerc (yellow card) 40'	Report	Boyé (yellow card) 39'; Morente 64', (yellow card) 67'; González (yellow card) 80'; Mfulu (yellow card) 88'	Stadium: Ciutat de València; Attendance: 0 Referee: Jorge Figueroa Vázquez

27 November 2020 11	Valladolid	1–1	Levante	Valladolid
21:00 CET (UTC+1)	Marcos André 57'	Report	Postigo (yellow card) 32'; Melero (yellow card) 40'; Gómez (yellow card) 74'; Campaña 83' (pen.)	Stadium: Estadio José Zorrilla; Attendance: 0 Referee: Valentín Pizarro Gómez

5 December 2020 12	Levante	3–0	Getafe	Valencia
14:00 CET (UTC+1)	Roger 5', (yellow card) 52'; Gómez 17', (yellow card) 50'; De Frutos 57'	Report	Chema (red card) 7'; Djené (yellow card) 11' (yellow-red card) 77'; Ángel (yellow card) 11'; Mata (yellow card) 23'; Arambarri (yellow card) 45+2'; Nyom (yellow card) 49'; Cucurella (yellow card) 88'	Stadium: Ciutat de València; Attendance: 0 Referee: David Medié Jiménez

13 December 2020 13	Barcelona	1–0	Levante	Barcelona
21:00 CET (UTC+1)	De Jong (yellow card) 49'; Messi 76'; Braithwaite (yellow card) 87'	Report	Vukčević (yellow card) 42'	Stadium: Camp Nou; Attendance: 0 Referee: Ricardo de Burgos Bengoetxea

19 December 2020 14	Levante	2–1	Real Sociedad	Valencia
18:30 CET (UTC+1)	Rochina (yellow card) 21'; Roger 28'; Vukčević (yellow card) 47'; De Frutos 87'	Report	Isak 22', (yellow card) 82'	Stadium: Ciutat de València; Attendance: 0 Referee: César Soto Grado

22 December 2020 15	Huesca	1–1	Levante	Huesca
19:45 CET (UTC+1)	Ontiveros 31' (pen.); López (yellow card) 69'; Insua (yellow card) 80'	Report	Vezo (yellow card) 30'; Róber (yellow card) 39'; Melero 53'; Rochina (yellow card) 90+1'	Stadium: Estadio El Alcoraz; Attendance: 0 Referee: Isidro Díaz de Mera

29 December 2020 16	Levante	4–3	Real Betis	Valencia
21:30 CET (UTC+1)	Duarte 2'; Roger (yellow card) 16', (goal) 55'; Morales 22', 24'; De Frutos (yellow card) 45+2'; Róber (red card) 68'; Clerc (yellow card) 75'	Report	Mandi 12', (yellow card) 90'; Canales 78' (pen.), 86'; Akouokou (yellow card) 81'	Stadium: Ciutat de València; Attendance: 0 Referee: Xavier Estrada Fernández

2 January 2021 17	Villarreal	2–1	Levante	Villarreal
14:00 CET (UTC+1)	Niño 19'; Pino (yellow card) 45'; Gerard 54'	Report	León 73'; Malsa (yellow card) 84'	Stadium: Estadio de la Cerámica; Attendance: 0 Referee: Pablo González Fuertes

10 January 2021 18	Levante	2–1	Eibar	Valencia
14:00 CET (UTC+1)	Malsa (yellow card) 48'; Melero 65'; Morales (yellow card) 66', (goal) 76'	Report	Inui 51'	Stadium: Ciutat de València; Attendance: 0 Referee: Xavier Estrada Fernández

19 January 2021 19	Cádiz	2–2	Levante	Cádiz
19:00 CET (UTC+1)	Perea 4'; Cala 28', (yellow card) 80'; Lozano (yellow card) 79'; Alcalá (yellow card) 85'	Report	Roger 8', 11'; Duarte (yellow card) 64'	Stadium: Ramón de Carranza; Attendance: 0 Referee: Carlos del Cerro Grande

22 January 2021 20	Levante	2–2	Valladolid	Valencia
21:00 CET (UTC+1)	Gómez 62'; Roger 83'	Report	Toni (yellow card) 28'; Alcaraz 73'; Plano 78'	Stadium: Ciutat de València; Attendance: 0 Referee: José Luis Munuera Montero

30 January 2021 21	Real Madrid	1–2	Levante	Madrid
16:15 CET (UTC+1)	Militão (red card) 9'; Asensio 13'; Casemiro (yellow card) 89'	Report	Morales 32'; Malsa (yellow card) 50'; Roger (penalty missed) 64', 78'; Melero (yellow card) 72'	Stadium: Alfredo Di Stéfano; Attendance: 0 Referee: David Medié Jiménez

6 February 2021 22	Levante	2–2	Granada	Valencia
14:00 CET (UTC+1)	Morales 30', 67', (yellow card) 74'	Report	Kenedy 43'; Montoro (yellow card) 55'; Soldado (yellow card) 79', (goal) 90+2'; Suárez (yellow card) 90+4'	Stadium: Ciutat de València; Attendance: 0 Referee: Adrián Cordero Vega

14 February 2021 23	Levante	0–1	Osasuna	Valencia
18:30 CET (UTC+1)	Toño (yellow card) 41'; Morales (penalty missed) 79'	Report	Calleri (yellow card) 9'; Moncayola (yellow card) 25'; Budimir 74'	Stadium: Ciutat de València; Attendance: 0 Referee: Santiago Jaime Latre

17 February 2021 2	Levante	1–1	Atlético Madrid	Valencia
19:00 CET (UTC+1)	Bardhi 17'; De Frutos (yellow card) 45'	Report	Saúl (yellow card) 26'; Llorente 37'; Savić (yellow card) 42'; Kondogbia (yellow card) 51'	Stadium: Ciutat de València; Attendance: 0 Referee: José Luis Munuera Montero
Note: Match originally scheduled for 19 September 2020, but postponed due to the delayed conclusion of last season's UEFA club competitions.

20 February 2021 24	Atlético Madrid	0–2	Levante	Madrid
16:15 CET (UTC+1)	Lemar (yellow card) 70'; Koke (yellow card) 70'	Report	Hermoso 30' (o.g.); Vezo (yellow card) 36'; Cárdenas (yellow card) 69'; Róber (yellow card) 90+1'; De Frutos 90+5'	Stadium: Wanda Metropolitano; Attendance: 0 Referee: Mario Melero López

26 February 2021 25	Levante	1–1	Athletic Bilbao	Valencia
21:00 CET (UTC+1)	Roger 33' (pen.); Coke (yellow card) 41'; Son (yellow card) 47'; Vukčević (yellow card) 56'	Report	R. García 56' (pen.); Morcillo (yellow card) 90+4'	Stadium: Ciutat de València; Attendance: 0 Referee: Isidro Díaz De Mera Escuderos

7 March 2021 26	Real Sociedad	1–0	Levante	San Sebastián
18:30 CET (UTC+1)	Merino 10'; Oyarzabal (penalty missed) 22'	Report	Rochina (yellow card) 38'; Gómez (yellow card) 40'	Stadium: Anoeta; Attendance: 0 Referee: César Soto Grado

12 March 2021 27	Levante	1–0	Valencia	Valencia
21:00 CET (UTC+1)	Vezo (yellow card) 4'; Roger 18'; Bardhi (yellow card) 39'; Vukčević (yellow card) 75'	Report	Jason (yellow card) 31'; Lato (yellow card) 34'; Diakhaby (yellow card) 61'; Vallejo (yellow card) 88'	Stadium: Ciutat de València; Attendance: 0 Referee: Guillermo Cuadra Fernández

19 March 2021 28	Real Betis	2–0	Levante	Seville
21:00 CET (UTC+1)	Rodríguez (yellow card) 57'; Fekir 70'; Juanmi 75'; Carvalho (yellow card) 84'	Report		Stadium: Benito Villamarín; Attendance: 0 Referee: Jesús Gil Manzano

2 April 2021 29	Levante	0–2	Huesca	Valencia
21:00 CEST (UTC+2)	Son (yellow card) 34'; Rochina (yellow card) 60'	Report	Pulido (yellow card) 14'; Mir 15', 54'; Seoane (yellow card) 49'	Stadium: Ciutat de València; Attendance: 0 Referee: Jorge Figueroa Vázquez

10 April 2021 30	Eibar	0–1	Levante	Eibar
18:30 CEST (UTC+2)	Diop (yellow card) 15'; García (yellow card) 60'; Arbilla (yellow card) 65'	Report	Clerc (yellow card) 17'; Postigo (yellow card) 38'; De Frutos 45+2'	Stadium: Ipurua; Attendance: 0 Referee: Xavier Estrada Fernández

18 April 2021 33	Levante	1–5	Villarreal	Valencia
21:00 CEST (UTC+2)	Malsa 21'; Roger (yellow card) 68'; Clerc (yellow card) 85'	Report	Postigo 9' (o.g.); Gerard 13'; Chukwueze 63', 75'; Coquelin (yellow card) 64'; Vezo 72' (o.g.)	Stadium: Ciutat de València; Attendance: 0 Referee: Ricardo de Burgos Bengoetxea
Note: The match was originally scheduled for 28 April 2021, but was brought forward by La Liga.

21 April 2021 31	Levante	0–1	Sevilla	Valencia
19:00 CEST (UTC+2)	Bardhi (yellow card) 31'; Melero (yellow card) 33'; Doukouré (yellow card) 76'; Rochina (yellow card) 88'	Report	Acuña (yellow card) 45'; En-Nesyri 53'	Stadium: Ciutat de València; Attendance: 0 Referee: Valentín Pizarro Gómez

24 April 2021 32	Elche	1–0	Levante	Elche
14:00 CEST (UTC+2)	Boyé 32'; Mojica (yellow card) 34'; Fidel (yellow card) 77'; Gazzaniga (yellow card) 79'	Report	Postigo (yellow card) 59'; Malsa (yellow card) 65'; Roger (yellow card) 74'; Bardhi (yellow card) 90+3'	Stadium: Martínez Valero; Attendance: 0 Referee: David Medié Jiménez

30 April 2021 34	Celta Vigo	2–0	Levante	Vigo
21:00 CEST (UTC+2)	Fontán (yellow card) 32'; Méndez 51'; Kevin (yellow card) 56'; Solari 74'	Report	Melero (yellow card) 39'; Vezo (yellow card) 71'	Stadium: Balaídos; Attendance: 0 Referee: Santiago Jaime Latre

8 May 2021 35	Alavés	2–2	Levante	Vitoria-Gasteiz
14:00 CEST (UTC+2)	Pons 30'; Rioja (yellow card) 44'; Battaglia (yellow card) 79'; Joselu 87'	Report	Morales 36', 42'; Cantero (yellow card) 51'	Stadium: Mendizorrotza; Attendance: 0 Referee: Carlos del Cerro Grande

11 May 2021 36	Levante	3–3	Barcelona	Valencia
22:00 CEST (UTC+2)	Melero 57'; Morales 59', (yellow card) 78'; De Frutos (yellow card) 67'; León 83'	Report	Messi 25'; Pedri 34'; Dembélé 64'; De Jong (yellow card) 77'; Lenglet (yellow card) 90+1'	Stadium: Ciutat de València; Attendance: 0 Referee: José Luis Munuera Montero

16 May 2021 37	Getafe	2–1	Levante	Getafe
18:30 CEST (UTC+2)	Aleñá 13'; Arambarri (yellow card) 82'; Kubo 84', (yellow card) 85'; Iglesias (yellow card) 86'; Timor (red card) 90+1'; Soria (yellow card) 90+4'; Hernández (yellow card) 90+6'	Report	Melero 30'	Stadium: Coliseum Alfonso Pérez; Attendance: 0 Referee: Adrián Cordero Vega

21 May 2021 38	Levante	2–2	Cádiz	Valencia
21:00 CEST (UTC+2)	Roger 8'; Melero 58'	Report	Negredo 14', (yellow card) 25'; Akapo 32'; Sobrino (yellow card) 41'	Stadium: Ciutat de València; Attendance: 0 Referee: Xavier Estrada Fernández

=== Copa del Rey ===
16 December 2020 First round	Racing Murcia	0–5	Levante	Lorca (Note: Racing Murcia did not play its game in its main stadium Municipal de Dolores de Pacheco, in Torre-Pacheco, as it does not meet the requirements to broadcast the match.)
19:00 CET (UTC+1)		Report	León 24', 33', 64'; Kochorashvili 87'; Coke 90+1'	Stadium: Francisco Artés Carrasco; Referee: Isidro Díaz De Mera

6 January 2021 Second round	Portugalete	1–2	Levante	Portugalete
12:00 CET (UTC+1)	Musy 62'	Report	Pedraza (yellow card) 26'; León 29', 90+3'; Toño (yellow card) 70'	Stadium: La Florida; Referee: Adrián Cordero Vega

16 January 2021 Round of 32	Fuenlabrada	1–1 (a.e.t.) (2–4 p)	Levante	Las Rozas (Note: Given the impossibility of being able to play the match at the Fernando Torres stadium in Fuenlabrada due to the consequences of the "Filomena" storm.)
18:00 CET (UTC+1)	Diéguez (yellow card) 7'; Salvador (yellow card) 47'; Glauder (yellow card) 59'; Garcés 68'	Report	Toño (yellow card) 12'; Glauder 19' (o.g.); Duarte (yellow card) 33'; Vukčević (yellow card) 47'; Gómez (yellow card) 97'; Malsa (yellow card) 103'	Stadium: La Ciudad del Fútbol; Referee: Santiago Jaime Latre
	Penalties
	Iribas (penalty scored); Pinchi (penalty scored); Garcés (penalty missed); Cristóbal (penalty missed)		(penalty scored) Roger; (penalty scored) Melero; (penalty scored) León; (penalty scored) Duarte

26 January 2021 Round of 16	Valladolid	2–4	Levante	Valladolid
19:00 CET (UTC+1)	Toni 13'; Weissman 65'; Orellana (yellow card) 73'; Alcaraz (yellow card) 80'	Report	Bardhi 23'; Malsa 45'; Coke 59'; Morales 80' (pen.)	Stadium: José Zorrilla; Referee: Valentín Pizarro Gómez

3 February 2021 Quarter-finals	Levante	1–0 (a.e.t.)	Villarreal	Valencia
19:00 CET (UTC+1)	Bardhi (yellow card) 25'; Rochina (yellow card) 42'; Postigo (yellow card) 88'; Melero (yellow card) 111'; Roger 120+1'	Report	Albiol (yellow card) 37'; Trigueros (yellow card) 57'; Parejo (yellow card) 103'; Baena (yellow card) 113'	Stadium: Ciutat de València; Referee: César Soto Grado

11 February 2021 Semi-finals; First leg	Athletic Bilbao	1–1	Levante	Bilbao
21:00 CET (UTC+1)	Martínez (yellow card) 19', (goal) 58'; R. García (yellow card) 31'	Report	Melero 26'; Coke (yellow card) 35'	Stadium: San Mamés; Referee: Jesús Gil Manzano

4 March 2021 Semi-finals; Second leg	Levante	1–2 (a.e.t.) (2–3 agg.)	Athletic Bilbao	Valencia
21:00 CET (UTC+1)	Roger 17'; Duarte (yellow card) 28'; Rochina (yellow card) 76'	Report	R. García 30' (pen.); Núñez (yellow card) 42'; López (yellow card) 55'; De Marcos (yellow card) 105+1'; Berenguer 112'	Stadium: Ciutat de València; Referee: Carlos del Cerro Grande

== Statistics ==
=== Appearances and goals ===
Last updated on the end of the season.

No.	Pos	Nat	Player	Total		La Liga		Copa del Rey	
No.	Pos	Nat	Player	Apps	Goals	Apps	Goals	Apps	Goals
Goalkeepers
13	GK	(Spain) ESP	Aitor Fernández	29	0	29	0	0	0
34	GK	(Spain) ESP	Daniel Cárdenas	13	0	8	0	5	0
Defenders
2	DF	(Spain) ESP	Son	34	0	10+18	0	4+2	0
3	DF	(Spain) ESP	Toño	17	0	9+3	0	5	0
4	DF	(Spain) ESP	Róber	20	0	16+3	0	1	0
6	DF	(Costa Rica) CRC	Óscar Duarte	34	1	23+6	1	3+2	0
14	DF	(Portugal) POR	Rúben Vezo	36	1	25+7	1	3+1	0
15	DF	(Spain) ESP	Sergio Postigo	27	0	19+3	0	4+1	0
19	DF	(Spain) ESP	Carlos Clerc	39	0	30+5	0	1+3	0
20	DF	(Spain) ESP	Jorge Miramón	29	0	19+7	0	1+2	0
23	DF	(Spain) ESP	Coke	23	2	11+6	0	5+1	2
Midfielders
5	MF	(Serbia) SRB	Nemanja Radoja	27	0	13+8	0	4+2	0
10	MF	(North Macedonia) MKD	Enis Bardhi	29	2	19+7	1	3	1
12	MF	(Martinique) MTQ	Mickaël Malsa	39	2	25+10	1	2+2	1
16	MF	(Spain) ESP	Rubén Rochina	30	0	17+8	0	4+1	0
17	MF	(Montenegro) MNE	Nikola Vukčević	15	0	11+2	0	2	0
22	MF	(Spain) ESP	Gonzalo Melero	35	8	21+8	7	4+2	1
24	MF	(Spain) ESP	José Campaña	9	1	8+1	1	0	0
25	MF	(Ivory Coast) CIV	Cheick Doukouré	7	0	0+7	0	0	0
27	MF	(Spain) ESP	Álex Blesa	1	0	0+1	0	0	0
43	MF	(Georgia (country)) GEO	Giorgi Kochorashvili	5	1	0+3	0	1+1	1
Forwards
7	FW	(Spain) ESP	Sergio León	33	7	6+22	2	4+1	5
9	FW	(Spain) ESP	Roger Martí	37	13	26+7	12	1+3	1
11	FW	(Spain) ESP	José Luis Morales	44	14	30+8	13	4+2	1
18	FW	(Spain) ESP	Jorge de Frutos	40	4	22+15	4	1+2	0
21	FW	(Spain) ESP	Daniel Gómez	39	2	17+17	2	2+3	0
29	FW	(Spain) ESP	Alejandro Cantero	4	0	3+1	0	0	0
44	FW	(Russia) RUS	Edgar Sevikyan	2	0	0+1	0	0+1	0
Players who have made an appearance or had a squad number this season but have left the club
1	GK	(Spain) ESP	Koke Vegas	2	0	1	0	1	0
31	MF	(Spain) ESP	Alfredo Pedraza	1	0	0	0	1	0

=== Goalscorers ===
As of 12 March 2021

Rank	No.	Pos.	Nat.	Name	La Liga	Copa del Rey	Total
1	9	FW	(Spain)	Roger	11	2	13
2	11	FW	(Spain)	José Luis Morales	10	1	11
3	7	FW	(Spain)	Sergio León	1	5	6
4	22	MF	(Spain)	Gonzalo Melero	4	1	5
5	18	FW	(Spain)	Jorge de Frutos	3	0	3
6	10	MF	(North Macedonia)	Enis Bardhi	1	1	2
6	21	FW	(Spain)	Dani Gómez	2	0	2
6	23	DF	(Spain)	Coke	0	2	2
9	6	DF	(Costa Rica)	Óscar Duarte	1	0	1
9	12	MF	(Martinique)	Mickaël Malsa	0	1	1
9	14	DF	(Portugal)	Rúben Vezo	1	0	1
9	24	MF	(Spain)	José Campaña	1	0	1
9	43	MF	(Georgia (country))	Giorgi Kochorashvili	0	1	1
Own goals					1	1	1
Totals					36	15	51
