= Rwan Cruz =

Brazilian footballer

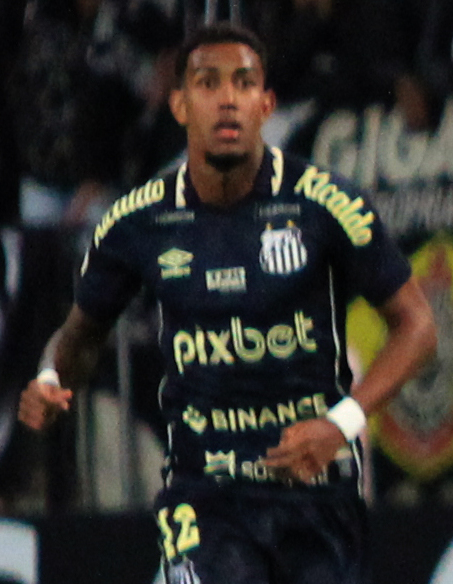
- Rwan with Santos in 2022

Personal information
- Full name: Rwan Philipe Rodrigues de Souza Cruz
- Date of birth: 20 May 2001 (age 25)
- Place of birth: Jaboatão dos Guararapes, Brazil
- Height: 1.87 m (6 ft 2 in)
- Position: Forward

Team information
- Current team: Ludogorets Razgrad (on loan from Botafogo)
- Number: 12

Youth career
- 2014: Náutico
- 2015–2018: Sport Recife
- 2019: Figueirense
- 2020–2021: Flamengo-SP
- 2020–2021: → Santos (loan)
- 2022: Santos

Senior career*
Years	Team	Apps	(Gls)
2022–2023	Santos	28	(3)
2023	→ Vasco da Gama (loan)	2	(0)
2023	→ Ludogorets Razgrad (loan)	17	(5)
2024–2025	Ludogorets Razgrad	33	(19)
2025–	Botafogo	14	(2)
2025	→ Real Salt Lake (loan)	10	(0)
2026–	→ Ludogorets Razgrad (loan)	17	(7)
- * Club domestic league appearances and goals as of 10:12, 9 September 2026 (UTC)

Rwan Philipe Rodrigues de Souza Cruz (born 20 May 2001), known as Rwan Seco, Rwan Cruz or just Rwan, is a Brazilian professional footballer who plays as a forward for Bulgarian First League club Ludogorets Razgrad on loan from Botafogo.

== Career ==
=== Early career ===
Born in Cajueiro Seco, a small neighborhood in Jaboatão dos Guararapes, Pernambuco, Rwan began his career at a local footballing school named Garoto do Futuro before joining Náutico's youth categories. One year later, he joined Sport Recife as they offered a small funding assistance.

Rwan left Sport in the end of 2018 and subsequently signed for Figueirense, but spent nine months without playing at his new side due to a registration problem. He subsequently moved to Flamengo-SP, but returned to his hometown in March 2020 due to the COVID-19 pandemic, and helped his father as a bricklayer.

=== Santos ===
In June 2020, Rwan agreed to join Santos on loan from Flamengo, being initially assigned to the under-20s. However, due to the club's transfer ban, he was registered only in the following May.

Rwan spent the 2021 season playing for Santos' under-20 and under-23 sides, and signed a permanent three-year deal on 16 December of that year. He made his professional debut on 20 February 2022, coming on as a second-half substitute for Lucas Braga in a 3–0 Campeonato Paulista home loss against São Paulo.

Rwan scored his first senior goal on 23 February 2022, netting his team's third in a 3–0 away win over Salgueiro, for the year's Copa do Brasil.

==== Loan to Vasco da Gama ====
On 31 March 2023, Rwan was loaned to fellow top tier side Vasco da Gama until the end of the year, with a buyout clause.

=== Ludogorets Razgrad ===
On 22 July 2023, Rwan was announced at Bulgarian side Ludogorets Razgrad on loan for one year, with a buyout option. In January 2024, he signed a permanent contract with the club, with Nonato moving in the opposite direction.

=== Botafogo ===
On 7 February 2025, Botafogo announced the signing of Rwan on a four-year contract.

== Career statistics ==
As of 10 February 2025

Appearances and goals by club, season and competition
Club	Season	League			State League		Cup		Continental		Other		Total	
Club	Season	Division	Apps	Goals	Apps	Goals	Apps	Goals	Apps	Goals	Apps	Goals	Apps	Goals
Santos	2021	Série A	0	0	—		—		—		4 (Note: Appearance(s) in Copa Paulista)	0	4	0
Santos	2022	Série A	17	2	4	0	3	1	6 (Note: Appearance(s) in Copa Sudamericana)	1	—		30	4
Santos	2023	Série A	0	0	7	1	0	0	0	0	—		7	1
Santos	Total		17	2	11	1	3	1	6	1	4	0	41	5
Vasco da Gama (loan)	2023	Série A	2	0	—		0	0	—		—		2	0
Ludogorets Razgrad (loan)	2023–24	Bulgarian First League	17	5	—		2	2	10 (Note: Four appearances in UEFA Europa League, four appearances and two goals in UEFA Europa Conference League)	2	0	0	29	9
Ludogorets Razgrad	2023–24	Bulgarian First League	15	9	—		3	1	2 (Note: Appearances in UEFA Europa League)	0	1 (Note: Appearances in Bulgarian Supercup)	0	21	10
Ludogorets Razgrad	2024–25	Bulgarian First League	18	10	—		1	0	15 (Note: Five appearances in UEFA Champions League, ten appearances and one goal in UEFA Europa League)	1	0	0	34	10
Ludogorets Razgrad	Total		50	24	0	0	6	4	27	3	2	0	81	29
Botafogo	2025	Série A	0	0	0	0	0	0	0	0	0	0	0	0
Career total			69	25	11	1	9	4	33	4	5	0	127	34
