= Francisco Venegas (painter) =

Spanish painter

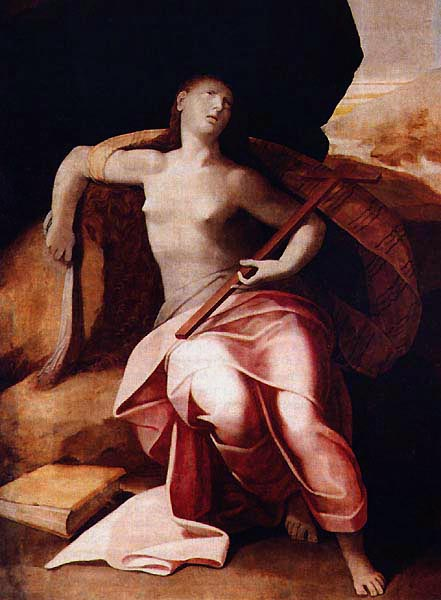
Santa Maria Madalena by Francisco Venegas, Igreja da Graça, 1590

Francisco Venegas (c. 1525 – 1594), was a Spanish painter active in Portugal in the last quarter of the sixteenth century. He was one of the most notable mannerist painters active in the country during that period.

== Early life ==
Venegas was born in Seville around the year 1525, having practiced the art of jewelry before becoming a painter. He was a student of Luis de Vargas, and spent a period in Rome, where he could observe the Italian Mannerist art of the time, as the works of Bartholomeus Spranger and Hans Speckaert.

== Career ==
In 1578 Venegas was already in Lisbon, and in 1583 he was appointed royal painter of Philip I of Portugal. In 1582, he directed the decoration of the ceiling of the church of the Hospital Real de Todos os Santos (Royal Hospital of All Saints), but unfortunately this work was lost in a fire in 1601. Around 1590, Venegas was to produce an altarpiece for the church of the Monastery of São Vicente de Fora, but this work was never carried out due to slow construction of the church. All that survives of this endeavor is one preparatory drawing, which is stored in the Office of the National Museum of Ancient Art.

== Works ==
An important work of Venegas still remaining in the original location is the altarpiece of the Igreja de Nossa Senhora da Luz (Church of Our Lady of Light) in Lisbon. The paintings are placed in a large wooden altarpiece in Mannerist style, in the chancel of the church built by Jérôme de Rouen between 1575 and 1590. Of the eight screens of the altarpiece, made around 1590, four are signed by the artist, including the central screen, dedicated to Apparition of Our Lady of Light. The other four paintings are by Diogo Teixeira, the usual partner of Venegas. The fact that he signed his works is a sign of his statement as a solo artist, something typical of Mannerism but relatively uncommon in Portugal at the time.

Another important work of Venegas is the illusionist painting the wooden ceiling of the Igreja de São Roque in Lisbon, a large composition that combines classic architecture with many sham medallions with religious images. The work, carried out between 1584 and 1590, was completed by the painter Amaro do Vale, author of medallions. Other works include a work for the St. Mary Magdalene Church of Grace in Lisbon.

Venegas died in Lisbon, in 1594, showered with honors.
