= Son (Spanish footballer) =

Spanish footballer

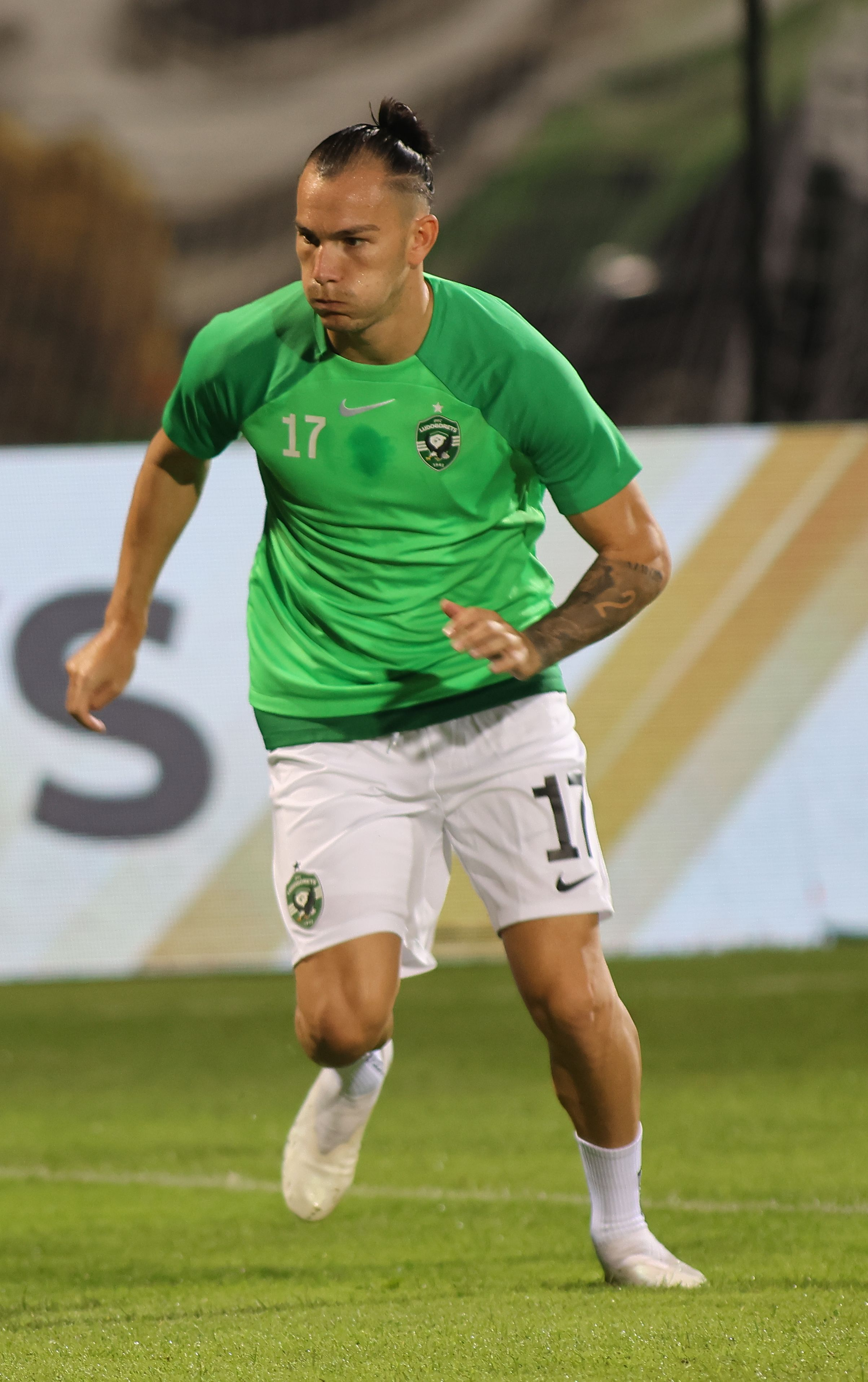

Personal information
- Full name: Francisco Javier Hidalgo Gómez
- Date of birth: 30 March 1994 (age 32)
- Place of birth: Seville, Spain
- Height: 1.78 m (5 ft 10 in)
- Position: Right back

Team information
- Current team: Ludogorets Razgrad
- Number: 17

Youth career
- Real Betis
- Sevilla Este
- Cerro
- Huévar
- 2011–2013: Nervión

Senior career*
Years	Team	Apps	(Gls)
2012–2013	Nervión		
2013–2014	Alcalá	31	(2)
2014–2015	San Roque	30	(7)
2015–2016	UCAM Murcia	5	(0)
2016	→ Villanovense (loan)	11	(0)
2016–2017	Levante B	30	(3)
2017–2018	Barakaldo	32	(6)
2018–2020	Ponferradina	75	(1)
2020–2023	Levante	88	(2)
2023–	Ludogorets Razgrad	97	(7)
- * Club domestic league appearances and goals as of 9 September 2026

Francisco Javier Hidalgo Gómez (born 30 March 1994), commonly known as Son, is a Spanish professional footballer who plays for Bulgarian First League club Ludogorets Razgrad. Mainly a right back, he can also play as a right winger.

== Career ==
Born in Seville, Andalusia, Son was an AD Nervión youth graduate, being also regularly utilized with the first team in the regional leagues during the 2012–13 season. In July 2013, he joined Tercera División side Alcalá.

In July 2014, Son moved to CD San Roque de Lepe in Segunda División B, and became a regular starter as his club achieved an impressive ninth position. He subsequently represented fellow third division sides UCAM Murcia, Villanovense, Atlético Levante, Barakaldo and Ponferradina; with the latter side he achieved promotion to Segunda División in 2019.

Son made his professional debut on 18 August 2019, starting in a 3–1 away loss against Cádiz. He was an undisputed starter for Ponfe during the campaign, appearing in 40 matches (37 as a starter) as his side avoided relegation.

On 23 July 2020, Son agreed to a four-year contract with La Liga side Levante. He made his top tier debut on 1 October, starting in a 1–0 away loss against Sevilla.

On 7 July 2023, Son moved abroad for the first time in his career, signing a contract with Ludogorets Razgrad in Bulgaria.

== Career statistics ==
As of match played 9 September 2026

Appearances and goals by club, season and competition
Club	Season	League			National cup		Europe		Other		Total	
Club	Season	Division	Apps	Goals	Apps	Goals	Apps	Goals	Apps	Goals	Apps	Goals
Alcalá	2013–14	Tercera Federación	31	2	—		—		—		31	2
San Roque	2014–15	Segunda División B	30	7	1	0	—		—		31	7
UCAM Murcia	2015–16	Segunda División B	5	0	2	0	—		—		7	0
Villanovense (loan)	2015–16	Segunda División B	11	0	—		—		—		11	0
Levante B	2016–17	Segunda División B	30	3	—		—		2 (Note: Appearances in relegation play-offs)	0	32	3
Barakaldo	2017–18	Segunda División B	32	6	0	0	—		—		32	6
Ponferradina	2018–19	Segunda División B	35	1	—		—		6 (Note: Appearances in Segunda División B play-offs)	0	41	1
Ponferradina	2019–20	Segunda División B	40	0	0	0	—		—		40	0
Ponferradina	Total		75	1	0	0	—		6	0	81	1
Levante	2020–21	La Liga	28	0	7	0	—		—		36	0
Levante	2021–22	La Liga	26	1	1	0	—		—		27	1
Levante	2022–23	Segunda División	34	1	2	0	—		3 (Note: Appearances in 2023 Segunda División play-offs)	0	39	1
Levante	Total		88	2	10	0	—		3	0	101	2
Ludogorets Razgrad	2023–24	Bulgarian First League	33	2	5	0	6 (Note: One appearance in UEFA Champions League, five appearances in UEFA Europa Conference League)	0	1 (Note: Appearances in Bulgarian Supercup)	0	45	2
Ludogorets Razgrad	2024–25	Bulgarian First League	29	5	5	0	13 (Note: Appearances in UEFA Champions League)	0	0	0	47	5
Ludogorets Razgrad	2025–26	Bulgarian First League	30	0	4	0	18 (Note: Appearances in UEFA Champions League)	2	1	0	53	2
Ludogorets Razgrad	2026–27	Bulgarian First League	5	0	0	0	2 (Note: Appearances in UEFA Europa Conference League)	0	0	0	7	0
Ludogorets Razgrad	Total		97	7	14	0	39	2	2	0	152	9
Career total			399	28	27	0	39	2	12	0	477	30
