= Simeon Vasilev =

Bulgarian footballer (born 2005)

Personal information
- Full name: Simeon Sergeev Vasilev
- Date of birth: 24 October 2005 (age 21)
- Place of birth: Sofia, Bulgaria
- Height: 1.82 m (6 ft 0 in)
- Position: Left-back

Team information
- Current team: Arda
- Number: 18

Youth career
- 2013–2021: Levski Sofia
- 2021–2023: CSKA 1948

Senior career*
Years	Team	Apps	(Gls)
2022–2023	CSKA 1948 III	29	(1)
2022–2023	CSKA 1948 II	15	(0)
2023–	CSKA 1948	31	(0)
2025–2026	→ Septemvri Sofia (loan)	9	(0)
2026–	Arda	5	(0)

International career^{‡}
2021–2022	Bulgaria U17	11	(0)
2023	Bulgaria U18	2	(0)
2023–	Bulgaria U21	4	(0)
- * Club domestic league appearances and goals as of 15:39, 6 October 2026 (UTC) ‡ National team caps and goals as of 09:26, 10 January 2024 (UTC)

Simeon Sergeev Vasilev (Bulgarian: Симеон Сергеев Василев; born 24 October 2005) is a Bulgarian professional footballer who plays as a defender for First League club Arda Kardzhali.

Vasilev's twin brother Viktor is playing for CSKA 1948 III.

== Career ==
Vasilev started his career in Tigers local academy, before moving to Levski Sofia in 2013. In July 2021, together with his twin broder, moved to CSKA 1948. Simeon completed his professional debut on 22 September 2023, in a league match against Cherno More. On 1 August 2024, he sustained a serious injury during the second leg against Montenegrin team Budućnost Podgorica in a UEFA Conference League qualifying match, which subsequently necessitated an operation in Barcelona. In June 2026, Vasilev signed a contract with Arda Kardzhali.

== Career statistics ==
=== Club ===
As of 12 October 2023

Club performance			League		Cup		Continental		Other		Total	
Club	League	Season	Apps	Goals	Apps	Goals	Apps	Goals	Apps	Goals	Apps	Goals
Bulgaria			League		Bulgarian Cup		Europe		Other		Total	
CSKA 1948 III	Third League	2022–23	29	1	–		–		–		29	1
CSKA 1948 II	Second League	2022–23	4	0	–		–		–		4	0
CSKA 1948 II	Second League	2023–24	10	0	–		–		–		10	0
CSKA 1948 II	Total		14	0	0	0	0	0	0	0	14	0
CSKA 1948	First League	2023–24	11	0	2	0	0	0	1	0	14	0
CSKA 1948	Total		11	0	2	0	0	0	1	0	14	0
Career statistics			57	1	2	0	0	0	1	0	58	1
