= FC Arda Kardzhali =

Bulgarian football club

Arda Kardzhali
- Full name: Професионален Футболен Клуб Арда 1924 Кърджали (Professional Football Club Arda 1924 Kardzhali)
- Nicknames: Сините от Кърджали (The Blues from Kardzhali); Господарите на Родопите (The Lords of the Rhodopes)
- Short name: Арда (Arda)
- Founded: August 10, 1924; 102 years ago (as Rodopski Sokol)
- Ground: Arena Arda, Kardzhali
- Capacity: 11,114
- Chairman: Yashar Durmushev
- Head coach: Aleksandar Tunchev
- League: First League
- 2025–26: First League, 6th of 16
- Website: fcarda.bg
Home colours	Away colours	Third colours

FC Arda 1924 Kardzhali (Bulgarian: ПФК Арда Кърджали) is a Bulgarian professional football club based in Kardzhali that competes in First League, the top tier of the Bulgarian football league system.

It was founded on 13 October 1924, as an association football branch of a larger sports society in the town. The club was reestablished in 2015, after its former entity was dissolved.

Named after the Arda river, a tributary of the Maritsa, Arda's home ground is the Arena Arda in Kardzhali, which has a capacity of 15,000 spectators. For the majority of its existence, the club regularly participated in the Second League, with its highest-ever ranking a second-place finish during the 1955–56 Bulgarian Second League. In the Bulgarian Cup, Arda have reached the finals once, in 2021, losing to CSKA Sofia.

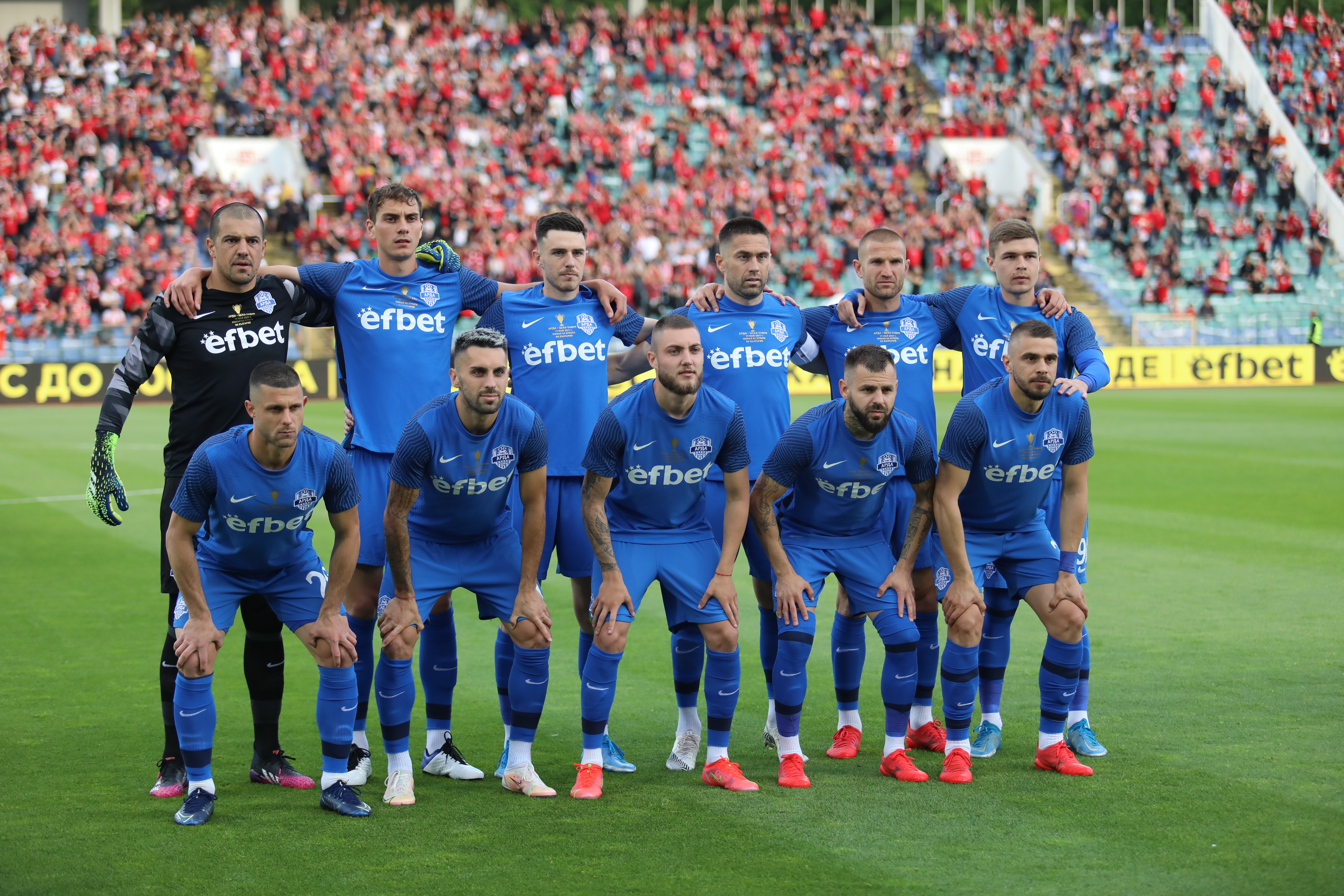
Arda Kardzhali line-up in 2021

In 2018–19, Arda won the Second League promotion play-off against Septemvri Sofia, resulting in the club's first-ever appearance in the Bulgarian top division.

== History ==
=== First Arda team (1924–2013) ===
Arda was established on August 10, 1924, under the name Rodopski Sokol, but later took the name Arda, derived from the nearby Arda River. From 1945 to 1957 the team was named Minyor until a year later when the previous name was put in use again. In 1956, the club finished as a runner-up in the B Group. They also reached the quarter-finals of the Bulgarian Cup during the 1959–60 campaign of the competition. In 1988 they secured the third place in the B Group. The Kardzhali club spend most of its time in the second and third levels of Bulgarian football, before getting dissolved in 2013 due to financial troubles.

=== Refounding (2015–2017) ===
Crest used from 2015 until 2024.

The team suffered relegation from the V Group in 2013 and didn't compete in any league division until 2015 when they returned to the A Regional Group after reestablishment. In 2016, Arda achieved promotion to the Bulgarian Third League after a successful season and a 3–0 win in the play-off match against Lyubimets.

=== PSI Group ownership and promotion to the elite (2017–present) ===
In early June 2017, the club was purchased by Bulgarian road construction company PSI Group, in an attempt to develop a football project, inspired by the domestic and international success of Ludogorets. Two weeks later, former Levski Sofia player Elin Topuzakov was appointed as head coach and Emil Kremenliev was hired as sporting director. Subsequently, Petar Peshev was elected chairman of the club and was revealed that the new ownership would invest around €1 million in new signings, salaries and infrastructure around the stadium during the following South-East Third League season. All of this led to an amateur double during the 2017–18 season, as Arda won both its group and the Cup of Bulgarian Amateur Football League, resulting in a promotion to the Bulgarian Second League.

After the unsatisfactory results in the first 5 rounds, Elin Topuzakov was released as a manager and Stoycho Stoev was appointed, but on 6 March 2019 Stamen Belchev was appointed as the new manager, after Stoev reached an agreement with the Bulgarian champions Ludogorets Razgrad. The team improved greatly, eventually managing a 3rd-place finish, enabling them to participate in the play-offs against relegation-avoider PFC Septemvri Sofia to enter the top level of Bulgarian football. Arda eventually won 0–1 over Septemvri at the Lokomotiv Stadium in Plovdiv, thus resulting in the club's first-time ever participation in the Bulgarian First League.

==== First seasons in the elite and Bulgarian Cup Final ====
Arda's first match in the Bulgarian top tier resulted in a 0–0 home draw against Botev Plovdiv. This was followed by an away 0–0 draw to Tsarsko Selo. Arda's first win came in the third round, when the team managed to beat Beroe Stara Zagora 3–1 at home. Arda then won their first away game in the top league, by beating Vitosa Bistritsa 1–3, extending their unbeaten run to four games. At the end of the first half of the season in December, Arda was in seventh place in the league, with seven wins, seven draws, and six losses. At the end of the regular season in June, Arda was in the relegation group. Despite this, on June 20, Arda secured their place in the First League for the upcoming season, after Botev Plovdiv beat Botev Vratsa 3–2.

Arda reached the final of the 2020–21 Bulgarian Cup, their first-ever participation at a final of the domestic cup. Arda faced CSKA Sofia, and lost by 1–0, in a closely fought game. A few days later, the team won the Europa Conference League play-off against Cherno More Varna and qualified for a European tournament for first time in their history. In the Europa Conference League, Arda faced Israeli side Hapoel Be'er Sheva. Arda's general inexperience with European football caused an upsetting 0–2 home loss, followed by a 4–0 away loss, which eliminated Arda from the Europa Conference League.

== Honours ==
- First League:
  - 4th place (2): 2020–21, 2024–25
- Bulgarian Cup:
  - Runners-up (1): 2020–21
- Third League
  - Winners (1): 2017–18
- A Regional Group
  - Winners (1): 2015–16
- Cup of Bulgarian Amateur Football League
  - Winners (1): 2017–18

== Players ==
=== Current squad ===
As of 31 August 2026

Note: Flags indicate national team as defined under FIFA eligibility rules; some limited exceptions apply. Players may hold more than one non-FIFA nationality.

No.	Pos.	Nation	Player
1	GK	BUL	Anatoli Gospodinov (captain)
2	DF	BRA	Derick
4	MF	NGR	David Idowu
5	DF	BUL	Viktor Lyubenov
6	DF	BUL	Viktor Popov
8	MF	BUL	Dominik Yankov
9	FW	BUL	Georgi Nikolov
10	MF	BUL	Svetoslav Kovachev
11	FW	BUL	Atanas Kabov
16	FW	BUL	Preslav Bachev
18	DF	BUL	Simeon Vasilev
20	MF	BUL	Serkan Yusein

No.	Pos.	Nation	Player
21	DF	UKR	Vyacheslav Velyev
22	GK	BUL	Yanko Georgiev
24	DF	BUL	Martin Paskalev
26	MF	TUR	Burak Akıncı
35	DF	BUL	Dimitar Velkovski
39	MF	BUL	Antonio Vutov
44	DF	CIV	Adama Traoré (on loan from CSKA 1948)
70	FW	TUN	Nabil Makni
80	MF	BUL	Lachezar Kotev
91	FW	BUL	Stanislav Ivanov
99	MF	BUL	Birsent Karagaren

For recent transfers, see List of Bulgarian football transfers summer 2026.

=== Foreign players ===
Up to twenty foreign nationals can be registered and given a squad number for the first team in the Bulgarian First League, however only five non-EU nationals can be used during a match day. Those non-EU nationals with European ancestry can claim citizenship from the nation their ancestors came from. If a player does not have European ancestry he can claim Bulgarian citizenship after playing in Bulgaria for 5 years.

EU Nationals

EU Nationals (Dual citizenship)

- (Ukraine) (Bulgaria) Vyacheslav Velyev
- (Bulgaria) (Canada) Dominik Yankov
- (Tunisia) (France) Nabil Makni
- (Turkey) (Bulgaria) Burak Akıncı

Non-EU Nationals

- (Brazil) Derick
- (Ivory Coast) Adama Traoré
- (Nigeria) David Idowu

== Goalscoring and appearance records ==
As of 19 December 2025

**Most appearances for the club in First League**

Rank	Name	Career	Appearances
1	(Bulgaria) Ivan Tilev	2020–2025	165
2	(Bulgaria) **Lachezar Kotev**	2020–present	149
3	(Bulgaria) Ivan Kokonov	2019–2024	145
4	(Bulgaria) Tonislav Yordanov	2021–2025	135
5	(Bulgaria) **Anatoli Gospodinov**	2022–present	119
6	(Bulgaria) **Svetoslav Kovachev**	2020–present	114
7	(Bulgaria) Deyan Lozev	2018–2024	102
8	(Bulgaria) Milen Stoev	2018–2025	101
9	(Bulgaria) Stanislav Ivanov	2022–2025	89
—	(Bulgaria) Aleksandar Georgiev	2019–2023	89

As of 19 December 2025

**Most goals for the club in First League**

Rank	Name	Career	Goals
1	(Bulgaria) Tonislav Yordanov	2021–2025	36
2	(Bulgaria) Ivan Kokonov	2019–2024	22
3	(Bulgaria) **Svetoslav Kovachev**	2020–present	21
4	(Bulgaria) Stanislav Ivanov	2022–2025	20
5	(Bulgaria) Spas Delev	2019–2021	14
6	(Bulgaria) Ivan Tilev	2020–2025	11
—	(Nigeria) Chinonso Offor	2024–2025	11
—	(Bulgaria) Radoslav Vasilev	2019–2021	11
—	(Bulgaria) Preslav Borukov	2023–2024	11
10	(Mali) Lassana N'Diaye	2022–2023	8

- Players in **bold** are still playing for Arda.

== Records and notable stats ==
=== Club Records ===
- Biggest home win in First League: Arda Kardzhali 5–0 Lokomotiv Plovdiv (17 February 2023) Arda Kardzhali 5–0 Lokomotiv Sofia (14 April 2025)
- Biggest away win in First League: Botev Plovdiv 0–5 Arda Kardzhali (4 August 2025)
- Biggest home loss in First League: Arda Kardzhali 0–4 Ludogorets Razgrad (12 February 2022)
- Biggest away loss in First League: Tsarsko Selo 4–0 Arda Kardzhali (25 April 2021)
- Unbeaten streak in First League (single season): 11 (2020–21)
- Most consecutive wins in First League (single season): 5 (2023–24)

== Notable players ==
The footballers enlisted below have international caps for their respective countries or more than 100 caps for Arda. Players whose name is listed in bold represented their countries.

Bulgaria

- (Bulgaria) **Mihail Aleksandrov**
- (Bulgaria) Ahmed Osman
- (Bulgaria) Dimitar Aleksiev
- (Bulgaria) **Preslav Borukov**
- (Bulgaria) **Spas Delev**
- (Bulgaria) **Aleksandar Georgiev**
- (Bulgaria) **Ventsislav Hristov**
- (Bulgaria) **Hristo Ivanov**
- (Bulgaria) **Stanislav Ivanov**
- (Bulgaria) **Ivan Karadzhov**
- (Bulgaria) **Mihail Karushkov**
- (Bulgaria) Ivan Kokonov
- (Bulgaria) Lachezar Kotev
- (Bulgaria) **Svetoslav Kovachev**
- (Bulgaria) Plamen Krumov
- (Bulgaria) Deyan Lozev
- (Bulgaria) **Martin Lukov**
- (Bulgaria) **Dimitar Makriev**
- (Bulgaria) **Aleks Petkov**
- (Bulgaria) Milen Stoev
- (Bulgaria) Ivan Tilev
- (Bulgaria) **Borislav Tsonev**
- (Bulgaria) **Radoslav Tsonev**
- (Bulgaria) Radoslav Uzunov
- (Bulgaria) **Radoslav Vasilev**
- (Bulgaria) **Ventsislav Vasilev**
- (Bulgaria) Tonislav Yordanov
- (Bulgaria) Iliya Yurukov
- (Bulgaria) **Petar Zehtinski**
- (Bulgaria) Milen Zhelev

Europe

- (Armenia) **Rumyan Hovsepyan**
- (Azerbaijan) **Cəlal Hüseynov**
- (Montenegro) **Slobodan Rubežić**
- (North Macedonia) **Darko Glišić**

Africa

- (Algeria) **Ilias Hassani**
- (Benin) **David Kiki**
- (Cameroon) **Félix Eboa Eboa**
- (Sierra Leone) **Alie Sesay**
- (Mauritania) **El Mami Tetah**
- (Niger) (Ivory Coast) **Oumar Sako**

Asia

- (Iraq) **Rebin Sulaka**

== European record ==
As of match played 28 August 2025

Competition	Played	Won	Drew	Lost	GF	GA	GD	Win%
UEFA Europa Conference League	8	2	2	4	6	11	−5	25.00
Total	8	2	2	4	6	11	−5	25.00

=== Matches ===
Season	Competition	Round	Club	Home	Away	Aggregate
2021–22	UEFA Europa Conference League	2Q	(Israel) Hapoel Be'er Sheva	0–2	0–4	0–6
2025–26	UEFA Conference League	2Q	(Finland) HJK	0–0	2–2	2–2 (4–3 p)
2025–26	UEFA Conference League	3Q	(Lithuania) Kauno Žalgiris	2–0	1–0	3–0
2025–26	UEFA Conference League	PO	(Poland) Raków Częstochowa	1–2	0–1	1–3

== Personnel ==
=== Board of directors ===
Position	Name	Nationality
President		(Bulgaria)
Director of Football		(Bulgaria)
Director of Sports Administration		(Bulgaria)
Administrator		(Bulgaria)

=== Current technical body ===
Position	Name	Nationality
Head Coach	Aleksandar Tunchev	(Bulgaria)
Assistant Coach	Veselin Minev	(Bulgaria)
Goalkeeper coach	Todor Popov	(Bulgaria)
Conditioning Coach	Anton Donchev	(Bulgaria)

=== Manager history ===
Name	Nat	From	To	Honours
Elin Topuzakov	(Bulgaria)	12 July 2017	26 August 2018	
Stoycho Stoev	(Bulgaria)	26 August 2018	6 March 2019	
Stamen Belchev	(Bulgaria)	6 March 2019	14 April 2020	
Nikolay Kirov	(Bulgaria)	15 April 2020	3 September 2021	
Georgi Chilikov	(Bulgaria)	8 September 2021	9 November 2021	
Slavko Matić	(Serbia)	12 November 2021	16 December 2021	
Stamen Belchev	(Bulgaria)	23 December 2021	14 May 2022	
Aleksandar Tunchev	(Bulgaria)	19 May 2022	25 February 2024	
Nikolay Kirov	(Bulgaria)	26 February 2024	31 May 2024	
Aleksandar Tunchev	(Bulgaria)	7 June 2024		

== Seasons ==
=== Past seasons ===
Results of league and cup competitions by season
Season	League											Bulgarian Cup	Other competitions		Top goalscorer	
Season	Division	Level	Pld	W	D	L	GF	GA	GD	Pts	Pos	Bulgarian Cup	Other competitions		Top goalscorer	
2015–16	A Regional League	4	8	7	0	1	45	7	+38	21	1st ↑	Not qualified				
2016–17	South-East Third League	3	34	11	6	17	49	69	–20	39	16th	Not qualified	Cup of Bulgarian Amateur League	N/Q		
2017–18	South-East Third League	3	34	30	4	0	142	7	+135	94	1st ↑	Not qualified	Cup of Bulgarian Amateur League	W	(Bulgaria) Dimitar Aleksiev	26
2018–19	Second League	2	30	19	5	6	44	18	+26	62	3rd ↑	Round of 32			(Bulgaria) Ventsislav Hristov	12
2019–20	First League	1	30	8	11	11	28	36	–8	35	9th	Round of 16			(Bulgaria) Radoslav Vasilev	9
2020–21	First League	1	31	13	11	7	42	37	+5	50	4th	Runners-up			(Bulgaria) Ivan Kokonov	8
2021–22	First League	1	32	8	11	13	38	51	–13	35	10th	Round of 16	Europa Conference League	2Q	(Bulgaria) Tonislav Yordanov	7
2022–23	First League	1	36	16	10	10	47	36	+9	58	7th	Quarter-final			(Mali) Lassana N'Diaye	8
2023–24	First League	1	36	14	9	13	39	35	+4	51	8th	Quarter-final			(Bulgaria) Tonislav Yordanov	7
2024–25	First League	1	36	15	13	8	54	41	+13	58	4th	Quarter-final			(Bulgaria) Tonislav Yordanov	12
2025–26	First League	1	36									Qualified	Europa Conference League			

Key

Champions	Runners-up	Promoted	Relegated
