= Luis de Vargas =

Spanish painter

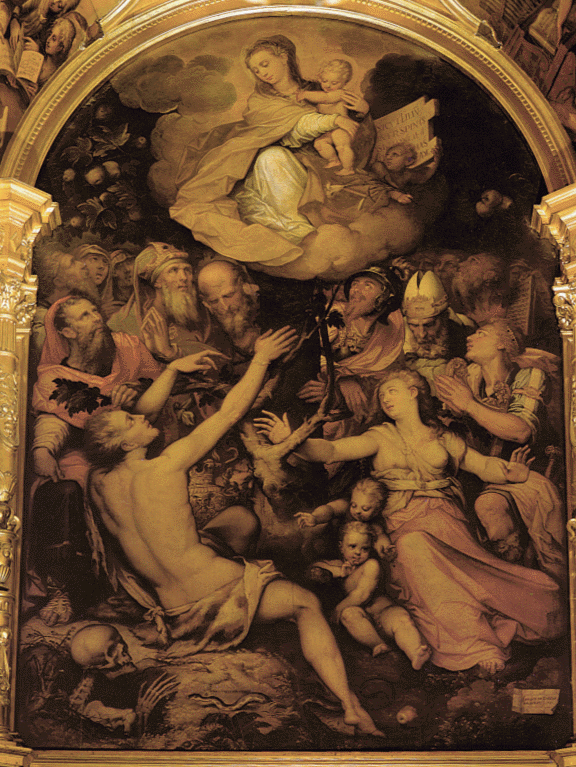
Luis de Vargas. Alegoría de la Inmaculada Concepción (Seville Cathedral)

Luis de Vargas (1502–1568) was a Spanish painter of the late-Renaissance period, active mainly in Seville. He traveled to Rome where he was influenced by Mannerist styles. He painted an altarpiece with multiple panels, including a Virgin and Child appearing to Adam and Eve or La Gamba for the Cathedral in Seville. He frescoed a Last Judgement for the Casa de Misericordia in Seville. Francisco Venegas was a student of his.
