= Diogo Teixeira =

Portuguese footballer

Personal information
- Full name: Diogo Emanuel Pinto Teixeira
- Date of birth: January 20, 1999 (age 27)
- Place of birth: Marco de Canaveses, Portugal
- Height: 1.78 m (5 ft 10 in)
- Position: Midfielder

Team information
- Current team: Dubočica
- Number: 20

Youth career
- 2009–2012: Porto
- 2012–2014: Colégio de Ermesinde
- 2014–2020: Rio Ave

Senior career*
Years	Team	Apps	(Gls)
2020–2021	Rio Ave B	5	(0)
2021	Rio Ave	1	(0)
2021–2022	Sanjoanense	5	(0)
2022–2023	Montalegre	23	(0)
2023–2025	Lokomotiv Sofia	48	(3)
2026–	Dubočica	9	(0)

International career
2017	Portugal U18	4	(1)
2018	Portugal U19	7	(0)
2018–2019	Portugal U20	6	(0)
Medal record
Men's football
Representing Portugal
UEFA European Under-19 Championship
Winner	2018 Finland
- * Club domestic league appearances and goals as of 14 May 2026

Diogo Emanuel Pinto Teixeira (born 20 January 1999) is a Portuguese professional footballer who plays as a midfielder for Serbian club Dubočica.

== Club career ==
Teixeira made his professional debut with Rio Ave in a 3-1 Primeira Liga win over Portimonense on 8 January 2021.

== International career ==
Teixeira is a youth international for Portugal, and was part of the Portugal U19s that won the 2018 UEFA European Under-19 Championship.
