= 2023–24 FC Zorya Luhansk season =

FC Zorya Luhansk
2023–24 season
- Head coach: Yuriy Koval
- Ukrainian Premier League: 11th
- Ukrainian Cup: Quarter-finals
- UEFA Europa League: Play-off round
- UEFA Europa Conference League: Group stage
- Top goalscorer: League: Eduardo Guerrero (7); All: Eduardo Guerrero (11)

The 2023–24 season was FC Zorya Luhansk's 101st season in existence and 18th consecutive in the Ukrainian Premier League. They are also competed in the Ukrainian Cup, the UEFA Europa League and the UEFA Europa Conference League.

== Players ==
=== First-team squad ===
As of 1 September 2023

Note: Flags indicate national team as defined under FIFA eligibility rules; some limited exceptions apply. Players may hold more than one non-FIFA nationality.

No.	Pos.	Nation	Player
1	GK	UKR	Oleksandr Saputin
2	DF	UKR	Bohdan Butko
3	DF	UKR	Anton Bol (on loan from Dynamo Kyiv)
4	MF	TOG	Kodjo Aziangbe (on loan from Al-Nasr)
5	MF	UKR	Oleksandr Yatsyk (on loan from Dynamo Kyiv)
6	MF	UKR	Illya Hulko
7	MF	UKR	Denys Antyukh
8	MF	UKR	Oleksiy Khakhlyov
9	MF	UKR	Dmytro Myshnyov (captain)
10	FW	UKR	Denys Nahnoynyi
11	FW	UKR	Danyil Alefirenko
15	MF	UKR	Kyrylo Dryshlyuk
16	MF	UKR	Vikentiy Voloshyn (on loan from Dynamo Kyiv)
17	FW	UKR	Ihor Horbach (on loan from Dynamo Kyiv)
18	MF	UKR	Yuriy Tlumak
19	FW	UKR	Vladyslav Buhay

No.	Pos.	Nation	Player
20	MF	UKR	Vyacheslav Churko
22	MF	SRB	Petar Mićin
24	MF	UKR	Ivan Holovkin
29	DF	UKR	Bohdan Tokar
30	GK	UKR	Mykyta Turbayevskyi
36	GK	UKR	Anton Zhylkin
38	MF	UKR	Maksym Smiyan
39	FW	PAN	Eduardo Guerrero
44	DF	UKR	Arseniy Batahov
47	DF	UKR	Roman Vantukh
53	GK	UKR	Dmytro Matsapura
55	DF	BRA	Jordan (on loan from Vila Nova)
70	DF	UKR	Ihor Kyryukhantsev
74	DF	UKR	Ihor Snurnitsyn
77	DF	UKR	Oleh Danchenko
78	FW	BRA	Wendell (on loan from Goiás)

=== Other players under contract ===
Note: Flags indicate national team as defined under FIFA eligibility rules; some limited exceptions apply. Players may hold more than one non-FIFA nationality.

No.	Pos.	Nation	Player
—	FW	BRA	Guilherme Smith

=== Out on loan ===
Note: Flags indicate national team as defined under FIFA eligibility rules; some limited exceptions apply. Players may hold more than one non-FIFA nationality.

No.	Pos.	Nation	Player
—	FW	IRI	Shahab Zahedi (at Persepolis until 30 June 2024)

== Transfers ==
=== In ===
Pos.	Player	Transferred from	Fee	Date	Source
FW	(Panama) Eduardo Guerrero	(Israel) Maccabi Tel Aviv	€500k	1 July 2023	
MF	(Ukraine) Ivan Golovkin	(Ukraine) Inhulets Petrove	€100k	7 July 2023	
DF	(Ukraine) Oleh Danchenko	(Greece) AEK Athens	Free	10 July 2023	
MF	(Serbia) Petar Mićin	(Serbia) Radnički Niš	€150k	2 August 2023	

=== Out ===
Pos.	Player	Transferred to	Fee	Date	Source

== Pre-season and friendlies ==
Win Draw Loss Fixtures

8 July 2023 Friendly	Stal Mielec (Poland)	0–1	(Ukraine) Zorya Luhansk

11 July 2023 Friendly	Zorya Luhansk (Ukraine)	2–1	(Slovakia) Zemplín Michalovce

14 July 2023 Friendly	Motor Lublin (Poland)	3–1	(Ukraine) Zorya Luhansk

22 July 2023 Friendly	Zorya Luhansk (Ukraine)	1–2	(Slovakia) Ružomberok

9 September 2023 Friendly	Kolos Kovalivka (Ukraine)	3–1	(Ukraine) Zorya Luhansk

== Competitions ==
=== Overall record ===
Competition	First match	Last match	Starting round	Final position	Record							
Competition	First match	Last match	Starting round	Final position	Pld	W	D	L	GF	GA	GD	Win %
Ukrainian Premier League	29 July 2023	19 May 2024	Matchday 1		12	2	4	6	13	17	−4	16.67
Ukrainian Cup	12 October 2023	1 November 2023	Round of 16	Quarter-finals	2	1	0	1	2	4	−2	50.00
UEFA Europa League	24 August 2023	31 July 2023	Play-off round	Play-off round	2	1	0	1	2	3	−1	50.00
UEFA Europa Conference League	21 September 2023		Group stage		4	1	1	2	5	7	−2	25.00
Total					20	5	5	10	22	31	−9	25.00

Last updated: 25 November 2023
Source: Soccerway

=== Ukrainian Premier League ===
==== League table ====
Pos	Team	Pld	W	D	L	GF	GA	GD	Pts
8	Oleksandriya	30	8	10	12	30	38	−8	34
9	Vorskla Poltava	30	9	6	15	30	46	−16	33
10	Zorya Luhansk	30	7	11	12	29	37	−8	32 (Note: Zorya Luhansk finished ahead of Kolos Kovalivka and Chornomorets Odesa on head-to-head points: Zorya Luhansk 7, Kolos Kovalivka 6, Chornomorets Odesa 4)
11	Kolos Kovalivka	30	7	11	12	22	31	−9	32
12	Chornomorets Odesa	30	10	2	18	38	47	−9	32

Source: upl.ua
Rules for classification: 1) Points; 2) Head-to-head points; 3) Head-to-head goal difference; 4) Head-to-head goals scored; 5) Goal difference; 6) Goals scored; 7) Draw or "Golden match" if two teams tied for title (Article 22, paragraph 3).

==== Results summary ====
Overall								Home						Away					
Pld	W	D	L	GF	GA	GD	Pts	W	D	L	GF	GA	GD	W	D	L	GF	GA	GD
12	2	4	6	13	17	−4	10	0	1	4	2	7	−5	2	3	2	11	10	+1

Last updated: 12 November 2023.

==== Results by round ====
Round	1	2	3	4	5	6	7	8	9	10	11	12	13	14	15	16
Ground	A	H	A	H	A	H	A	H	A	H	A	H	A	H	A	H
Result	L	L	W	D	D	P	L	L	D	P	W	L	D	L	P	
Position																

Updated to match(es) played on 12 November 2023. Source:
A = Away; H = Home; W = Win; D = Draw; L = Loss; P = Postponed

==== Matches ====
29 July 2023 1	FC Rukh Lviv	2–1	Zorya Luhansk	Lviv
15:00 EEST (UTC+3)				Stadium: Ukraina Stadium; Referee: Oleksiy Derevinskyi

6 August 2023 2	Zorya Luhansk	1–3	FC Kryvbas Kryvyi Rih	Kyiv
17:00 EEST (UTC+3)				Stadium: Stadion Livyi Bereh; Referee: Mykola Balakin

13 August 2023 3	FC Vorskla Poltava	1–2	Zorya Luhansk	Poltava
15:00 EEST (UTC+3)				Stadium: Oleksiy Butovsky Vorskla Stadium; Referee: Dmytro Bondarenko

18 August 2023 4	Zorya Luhansk	0–0	FC Oleksandriya	Kyiv
19:00 EEST (UTC+3)				Stadium: Stadion Livyi Bereh; Referee: Yury Ivanov

27 August 2023 5	FC Mynai	1–1	Zorya Luhansk	Mynai
13:00 EEST (UTC+3)				Stadium: Stadion Mynai; Referee: Oleksandr Afanasiev

15 September 2023 7	Metalist 1925 Kharkiv	2–1	Zorya Luhansk	Kyiv
18:30 EEST (UTC+3)				Stadium: Stadion Livyi Bereh; Referee: Klym Zabroda

24 September 2023 8	Zorya Luhansk	0–1	Dnipro-1	Lviv
15:00 EEST (UTC+3)				Stadium: Ukraina Stadium; Referee: Kateryna Monzul

30 September 2023 9	Chernomorets Odesa	0–0	Zorya Luhansk	Odesa
19:00 EEST (UTC+3)				Stadium: Chornomorets Stadium; Referee: Mykola Balakin

20 October 2023 11	Obolon Kyiv	2–4	Zorya Luhansk
17:00 EEST (UTC+3)

28 October 2023 12	Zorya Luhansk	0–1	Polissya Zhytomyr
16:00 EEST (UTC+3)

5 November 2023 13	Veres Rivne	2–2	Zorya Luhansk	Rivne
17:00 EET (UTC+2)				Stadium: Avanhard Stadium; Referee: Denys Reznikov

12 November 2023 14	Zorya Luhansk	1–2	LNZ Cherkasy	Lviv
14:00 EET (UTC+2)				Stadium: Skif Stadium; Referee: Sofiia Prychyna

4 December 2023 16	Zorya Luhansk	v	FC Rukh Lviv
EET (UTC+2)

9 December 2023 17	FC Kryvbas Kryvyi Rih	v	Zorya Luhansk
EET (UTC+2)

1 September 2023 6	Zorya Luhansk	Postponed	Dynamo Kyiv
EET (UTC+2)

7 October 2023 10	Zorya Luhansk	Postponed	Shakhtar Donetsk
EET (UTC+2)

24 November 2023 15	Kolos Kovalivka	Postponed	Zorya Luhansk
EET (UTC+2)

=== Ukrainian Cup ===
12 October 2023 Round of 16	FSC Mariupol	0–1	Zorya Luhansk	Boryspil
13:00 EEST (UTC+3)			Voloshyn 45+3'	Stadium: Stadion Kolos; Referee: Dmytro Kubryak

1 November 2023 Quarter-finals	Chernomorets Odesa	4–1	Zorya Luhansk	Odesa
15:00 EET (UTC+2)	Shtohrin 21', 33', 73'; Vasylyev 59'		Guerrero 82'	Stadium: Chornomorets Stadium; Referee: Mykola Balakin

=== UEFA Europa League ===
==== Play-off round ====
24 August 2023 First leg	Slavia Prague (Czech Republic)	2–0	(Ukraine) Zorya Luhansk	Prague, Czech Republic
19:00 CEST (UTC+2)	Tijani 81'; Masopust 90+4'	Report		Stadium: Fortuna Arena; Attendance: 18,522; Referee: Kristo Tohver (Estonia)

31 August 2023 Second leg	Zorya Luhansk (Ukraine)	2–1 (2–3 agg.)	(Czech Republic) Slavia Prague	Lublin, Poland
19:00 CEST (UTC+2)	Alefirenko 32'; Antyukh 41'	Report	Jurásek 83'	Stadium: Arena Lublin; Attendance: 964; Referee: Jérôme Brisard (France)

=== UEFA Europa Conference League ===
==== Group stage ====
The draw for the group stage was held on 1 September 2023.

Pos	Team	Pld	W	D	L	GF	GA	GD	Pts	Qualification	MTA	GNT	ZOR	BRE
1	(Israel) Maccabi Tel Aviv	6	5	0	1	14	9	+5	15	Advance to round of 16	—	3–1	3–2	3–2
2	(Belgium) Gent	6	4	1	1	16	7	+9	13	Advance to knockout round play-offs	2–0	—	4–1	5–0
3	(Ukraine) Zorya Luhansk	6	2	1	3	10	11	−1	7		1–3	1–1	—	4–0
4	(Iceland) Breiðablik	6	0	0	6	5	18	−13	0		1–2	2–3	0–1	—

Source: UEFA
Rules for classification: Group stage tiebreakers

21 September 2023 1	Zorya Luhansk (Ukraine)	1–1	(Belgium) Gent	Lublin, Poland
21:00 CET (UTC+1)	Guerrero 70'	Report	Cuypers 67'	Stadium: Arena Lublin; Attendance: 539; Referee: Daniele Chiffi (Italy)

5 October 2023 2	Breiðablik (Iceland)	0–1	(Ukraine) Zorya Luhansk	Reykjavík, Iceland
16:45 WET (UTC±0)		Report	Horbach 35'	Stadium: Laugardalsvöllur; Attendance: 1,738; Referee: Aleksandar Stavrev (North Macedonia)

9 November 2023 3	Zorya Luhansk (Ukraine)	1–3	(Iceland) Maccabi Tel Aviv	Lublin, Poland
21:00 CET (UTC+1)	Alefirenko 74'	Report	Luckassen 7'; Peretz 26', 43'	Stadium: Arena Lublin; Attendance: 763; Referee: John Beaton (Scotland)

25 November 2023 4	Maccabi Tel Aviv (Israel)	3–2	(Ukraine) Zorya Luhansk	Bačka Topola, Serbia
18:45 CET (UTC+1)	Zahavi 45+2'; Peretz 46', 60'	Report	Guerrero 71'; Horbach 88'	Stadium: TSC Arena; Attendance: 0 Referee: Lukas Fähndrich (Switzerland)

30 November 2023 5	Gent (Belgium)	1–4	(Ukraine) Zorya Luhansk	Ghent, Belgium
18:45 CET (UTC+1)		Report		Stadium: Ghelamco Arena

14 December 2023 6	Zorya Luhansk (Ukraine)	4–0	(Iceland) Breiðablik	Lublin, Poland
21:00 CET (UTC+1)		Report		Stadium: Arena Lublin
