= 2023–24 Ferencvárosi TC season =

Ferencváros
2023–24 season
- Chairman: Gábor Kubatov
- Manager: Stanislav Cherchesov (until 19 July); Csaba Máté (caretaker from 20 July to 4 September); Dejan Stanković (from 4 September)
- Stadium: Groupama Arena
- Nemzeti Bajnokság I: 1st
- Magyar Kupa: Runners-up
- UEFA Champions League: First qualifying round
- UEFA Europa Conference League: Knockout round play-offs
- Top goalscorer: League: Barnabás Varga (20); All: Barnabás Varga (29)
Home colours	Away colours

The 2023–24 season is Ferencvárosi Torna Club's 120th competitive season, 15th consecutive season in the Nemzeti Bajnokság I, where they will be competing as five-time defending champions and 125th year in existence as a football club. In addition to the domestic league, Ferencváros participate in this season's editions of the Magyar Kupa, UEFA Champions League and UEFA Europa Conference League.

The team's season started with an early exit from the Champions League's qualifying phase, which saw the sacking of manager Stanislav Cherchesov with replaced by with Csaba Máté as a caretaker. Under his leadership they qualified for the group stage of the Conference League, however on September 4, head coach Dejan Stanković was appointed.

== First team squad ==
As of 27 July 2023

Note: Flags indicate national team as defined under FIFA eligibility rules; some limited exceptions apply. Players may hold more than one non-FIFA nationality.

No.	Pos.	Nation	Player
1	GK	HUN	Ádám Varga
3	DF	MAR	Samy Mmaee
4	DF	NED	Mats Knoester
5	MF	BIH	Muhamed Bešić
7	MF	TUN	Mohamed Ali Ben Romdhane
8	FW	MAR	Ryan Mmaee
10	FW	NOR	Tokmac Nguen
11	FW	GHA	Owusu Kwabena
13	MF	NGR	Anderson Esiti
14	MF	BIH	Amer Gojak
15	MF	ISR	Mohammad Abu Fani
16	MF	NOR	Kristoffer Zachariassen
17	DF	BIH	Eldar Ćivić
18	MF	HUN	Dávid Sigér
19	FW	HUN	Barnabás Varga
20	FW	MLI	Adama Traoré
21	DF	HUN	Endre Botka

No.	Pos.	Nation	Player
22	DF	SUR	Myenty Abena
23	DF	HUN	Lóránd Pászka
24	FW	NGR	Tosin Kehinde
25	MF	LAT	Cebrail Makreckis
27	DF	FRA	Ibrahim Cissé
28	FW	ARG	Carlos Auzqui
29	GK	HUN	Gergő Szécsi
30	MF	HUN	Péter Baráth
31	DF	USA	Henry Wingo
50	FW	BRA	Marquinhos
52	FW	DEN	Nikolai Frederiksen
60	MF	ALG	Mehdi Boudjemaa
68	FW	HUN	Ádám Halmai
72	FW	SRB	Aleksandar Pešić
76	FW	HUN	Krisztián Lisztes
90	GK	HUN	Dénes Dibusz (captain)
99	DF	ECU	Cristian Ramírez

== Transfers ==
=== Summer ===
In: Note: Flags indicate national team as defined under FIFA eligibility rules; some limited exceptions apply. Players may hold more than one non-FIFA nationality.

No.	Pos.	Nation	Player
7	MF	TUN	Mohamed Ali Ben Romdhane (from (Tunisia) Espérance de Tunis)
15	MF	ISR	Mohammad Abu Fani (from (Israel) Maccabi Haifa)
19	FW	HUN	Barnabás Varga (from Paks)
24	FW	NGR	Tosin Kehinde (from (Denmark) Randers)
24	MF	HUN	Máté Katona (loan return from Kecskemét)
25	MF	LAT	Cebrail Makreckis (from (Bulgaria) Pirin Blagoevgrad)
27	DF	FRA	Ibrahim Cissé (from (France) Caen)
30	MF	HUN	Péter Baráth (from Debrecen)
42	GK	HUN	Ádám Varga (loan return from Kecskemét)
44	MF	BIH	Stjepan Lončar (loan return from (Belgium) Kortrijk)
55	MF	HUN	Bálint Katona (loan return from Kecskemét)
68	FW	HUN	Ádám Halmai (from Soroksár)
72	FW	SRB	Aleksandar Pešić (from (Serbia) Red Star Belgrade)
80	FW	SRB	Željko Gavrić (loan return from (Slovakia) DAC Dunajská Streda)
88	FW	CRO	Roko Baturina (loan return from (Spain) Racing Santander)
99	DF	ECU	Cristian Ramírez (from (Russia) Krasnodar)

Out: Note: Flags indicate national team as defined under FIFA eligibility rules; some limited exceptions apply. Players may hold more than one non-FIFA nationality.

No.	Pos.	Nation	Player
1	GK	HUN	Ádám Bogdán (End of contract)
7	MF	FRA	Xavier Mercier (to (Belgium) RWDM)
15	DF	BIH	Adnan Kovačević (to (Poland) Raków Częstochowa)
19	MF	HUN	Bálint Vécsei (End of contract)
24	MF	HUN	Máté Katona (to Soroksár)
70	FW	CIV	Franck Boli (to (United States) Portland Timbers)
80	FW	SRB	Željko Gavrić (to (Slovakia) DAC Dunajská Streda)
88	FW	CHI	Ángelo Sagal (loan return to (Turkey) Gaziantep)

== Competitions ==
=== Overview ===
Competition	First match	Last match	Starting round	Final position	Record							
Competition	First match	Last match	Starting round	Final position	Pld	W	D	L	GF	GA	GD	Win %
Nemzeti Bajnokság I	6 August 2023	19 May 2024	Matchday 1	Winners	33	23	5	5	80	30	+50	69.70
Magyar Kupa	16 September 2023	TBA	Round of 64	TBA	4	3	1	0	15	4	+11	75.00
UEFA Champions League	11 July 2023	19 July 2023	First qualifying round	First qualifying round	2	0	1	1	0	3	−3	0.00
UEFA Europa Conference League	27 July 2023	22 February 2024	Second qualifying round	Knockout round play-offs	14	8	4	2	30	10	+20	57.14
Total					53	34	11	8	125	47	+78	64.15

Last updated: 19 May 2024
Source: Competitions

=== Nemzeti Bajnokság I ===
==== League table ====
Pos	Team	Pld	W	D	L	GF	GA	GD	Pts	Qualification or relegation
1	Ferencváros (C)	33	23	5	5	80	30	+50	74	Qualification for the Champions League second qualifying round (Note: Since already qualified Real Madrid won the Champions League, Ferencváros was promoted to the Champions League second qualifying round as one of the two champions with the highest coefficient in Champions League qualifying.)
2	Paks	33	17	7	9	51	42	+9	58	Qualification for the Europa League first qualifying round (Note: Paks qualified for the Europa League first qualifying round by winning the 2023–24 Magyar Kupa. Since they qualified based on league position, the second Conference League second round spot was passed to the fourth-placed team.)
3	Puskás Akadémia	33	15	10	8	60	35	+25	55	Qualification for the Conference League second qualifying round
4	Fehérvár	33	16	6	11	55	40	+15	54	Qualification for the Conference League second qualifying round
5	Debrecen	33	14	6	13	49	48	+1	48	

Source: Hungarian Football Federation (in Hungarian), Soccerway
Rules for classification: 1) Points; 2) Matches won; 3) Goal difference; 4) Goals scored; 5) Head-to-head points; 6) Head-to-head goal difference; 7) Fair play ranking; 8) Drawing of lots.
(C) Champions

==== Results summary ====
Overall								Home						Away					
Pld	W	D	L	GF	GA	GD	Pts	W	D	L	GF	GA	GD	W	D	L	GF	GA	GD
33	23	5	5	80	30	+50	74	11	4	2	35	10	+25	12	1	3	45	20	+25

Last updated: 19 May 2024.
Source: Soccerway

==== Results by round ====
Round	1	2	3	4	5	6	7	8	9	10	11	12	13	14	15	16	17	18	19	20	21	22	23	24	25	26	27	28	29	30	31	32	33
Ground	H	A	H	A	H	A	H	A	H	A	H	A	H	A	H	A	H	A	H	A	H	A	H	A	H	A	H	A	H	A	H	A	H
Result	W	W	L	W	W	W	W	W	D	W	W	L	L	D	D	L	W	W	W	W	W	W	W	W	D	W	W	W	D	W	W	L	W
Position	4	1	2	1	1	1	1	1	1	1	1	1	1	1	2	2	2	2	2	2	2	2	2	1	1	1	1	1	1	1	1	1	1

Updated to match(es) played on 19 May 2024. Source: Matches
A = Away; H = Home; W = Win; D = Draw; L = Loss

==== Matches ====
6 August 2023 2	Fehérvár	3–5	Ferencváros	Székesfehérvár
17:45 CEST (UTC+2)	Kastrati 45'; Zeke (yellow card) 50'; Kodro 53', 57', (yellow card) 90+4'	Report	Lisztes 13'; Ramírez 30'; Baráth (yellow card) 48'; Zachariassen 63'; B. Varga 66'; Traoré 71'	Stadium: MOL Aréna Sóstó; Attendance: 7,051; Referee: Tamás Bognár
Note: The match was originally scheduled for 5 August 2023, but was postponed due to Ferencváros's participation in European competition.

13 August 2023 3	Ferencváros	1–2	Puskás Akadémia	Budapest
CEST (UTC+2)	Ben Romdhane (yellow card) 56'; Cissé (yellow card) 65'; Lisztes 90+5'	Report	Golla 12', (yellow card) 18'; Plšek 29'; Slagveer (yellow card) 34'; Szolnoki (yellow card) 54'; Colley (yellow card) 65'; Ormonde-Ottewill (yellow card) 75'; Markek (yellow card) 84'	Stadium: Groupama Arena; Attendance: 10,527; Referee: Ferenc Karakó

27 August 2023 5	Ferencváros	6–1	Paks	Budapest
17:30 CEST (UTC+2)	Traoré 10'; B. Varga 19', 29', 44'; S. Mmaee 45+3'; Nguen 45+6'	Report	Kinyik (yellow card) 6'; Kovács 35'; B. Szabó (yellow card) 45+2'	Stadium: Groupama Arena; Attendance: 7,657; Referee: Balázs Berke

3 September 2023 6	Zalaegerszeg	2–6	Ferencváros	Zalaegerszeg
17:15 CEST (UTC+2)	Mance 4'; Mim 19'; Bedi (yellow card) 36'; Lesjak (yellow card) 84'	Report	B. Varga 27' (pen.), 37' (pen.), 51'; Traoré 38', 86' (pen.); Cissé (yellow card) 42'; Ben Romdhane (yellow card) 48'; Zachariassen 90'	Stadium: ZTE Arena; Attendance: 5,313; Referee: József Erdős

24 September 2023 7	Ferencváros	1–0	Kisvárda	Budapest
17:30 CEST (UTC+2)	Lisztes 44'; Sigér (yellow card) 70'; Botka (yellow card) 86'	Report	Melnyk (yellow card) 43'; Cipetić (yellow card) 56'; Ilievski (yellow card) 77'; Lippai (yellow card) 84'; Kovačić (yellow card) 90+2'	Stadium: Groupama Arena; Attendance: 8,127; Referee: Gergő Bogár

27 September 2023 1	Ferencváros	1–0	Kecskemét	Budapest
20:00 CEST (UTC+2)	Sigér 72'; Abena (yellow card) 83'	Report	Kiss (yellow card) 28'; Zeke (yellow card) 49'; Bar. Tóth (yellow card) 71'; Vágó (yellow card) 89'	Stadium: Groupama Arena; Attendance: 7,299; Referee: Ferenc Karakó
Note: The match was originally scheduled for 29 July 2023, but was postponed due to both teams participation in European competitions.

30 September 2023 8	MTK	1–6	Ferencváros	Budapest
17:00 CEST (UTC+2)	Bognár 10'; Kata (yellow card) 46'	Report	B. Varga 23'; Marquinhos 41', 55'; Makreckis (yellow card) 58'; Wingo 63'; Abu Fani 86'; Pešić 90+2'	Stadium: Hidegkuti Nándor Stadion; Attendance: 5,322; Referee: Balázs Berke

8 October 2023 9	Ferencváros	2–2	Debrecen	Budapest
16:30 CEST (UTC+2)	Marquinhos 1'; S. Mmaee 18', (yellow card) 37'; Abu Fani (yellow card) 36'; Wingo (yellow card) 52'; Stanković (not on pitch) (yellow card) 62'; Pešić (yellow card) 86'; Lisztes (red card) 90+4'	Report	Ojediran (yellow card) 11'; Vajda 45'; Bárány (yellow card) 57'; Domingues 64'; Romanchuk (yellow card) 78'; Bévárdi (yellow card) 85'; Kusnyír (yellow card) 90+4'	Stadium: Groupama Arena; Attendance: 12,793; Referee: Ádám Farkas

22 October 2023 10	Diósgyőr	1–2	Ferencváros	Miskolc
17:45 CEST (UTC+2)	Pernambuco (yellow card) 52'; Vancaš 69' (pen.)	Report	Botka 14', (yellow card) 90+7'; B. Varga (yellow card) 28'; Abu Fani (yellow card) 45+2'; Pešić 61'; Wingo (yellow card) 68'; Marquinhos (yellow card) 75'	Stadium: DVTK Stadion; Attendance: 12,178; Referee: Gergő Bogár

29 October 2023 11	Ferencváros	3–0	Újpest	Budapest
18:00 CEST (UTC+2)	Lisztes (yellow card) 21'; Pešić 28'; Abena 70'; Abu Fani 74'	Report	Hall (yellow card) 53'; Kosanović (yellow card) 82'	Stadium: Groupama Arena; Attendance: 20,357; Referee: Ferenc Karakó

5 November 2023 12	Kecskemét	2–1	Ferencváros	Kecskemét
14:45 CET (UTC+1)	Pálinkás 18'; Vágó (yellow card) 27'; Horváth 33' (pen.); Iyinbor (yellow card) 52'; Szalai (yellow card) 56'; Zeke (yellow card) 70'; Májer (yellow card) 90+8'	Report	Esiti (yellow card) 23'; Makreckis (yellow card) 56'; Lisztes 69' (pen.), (yellow card) 71'	Stadium: Széktói Stadion; Attendance: 4,957; Referee: Csaba Pintér

12 November 2023 13	Ferencváros	0–1	Fehérvár	Budapest
16:00 CET (UTC+1)	Ben Romdhane (yellow card) 35'; Marquinhos (yellow card) 82'; Sigér (yellow card) 86'	Report	L. Szabó 67'; Flores (yellow card) 90+2'; Bal. Tóth (yellow card) 90+6'; Pinto (yellow card) 90+7'	Stadium: Groupama Arena; Attendance: 11,007; Referee: Ferenc Karakó

26 November 2023 14	Puskás Akadémia	1–1	Ferencváros	Felcsút
17:00 CET (UTC+1)	Szolnoki (yellow card) 42'; Colley (yellow card) 45', (goal) 57'; Nagy (yellow card) 60'; Stronati (yellow card) 78'; Maceiras (yellow card) 84'	Report	Zachariassen 18'	Stadium: Pancho Aréna; Attendance: 3,525; Referee: Gergő Bogár

3 December 2023 15	Ferencváros	0–0	Mezőkövesd	Budapest
17:45 CET (UTC+1)	Pešić (yellow card) 31'	Report	Kojnok (yellow card) 43'; Cseke (yellow card) 60'; Vayda (yellow card) 70'; Molnár (yellow card) 77'	Stadium: Groupama Arena; Attendance: 6,127; Referee: Mihály Káprály

6 December 2023 4	Mezőkövesd	0–2	Ferencváros	Mezőkövesd
19:30 CET (UTC+1)	Gomis (yellow card) 17'; Vayda (yellow card) 40'; Kállai (yellow card) 80'	Report	Zachariassen 12', (yellow card) 58'; Aaneba (yellow card) 52'; Marquinhos 71', (yellow card) 88'; Abu Fani (yellow card) 90'	Stadium: Városi Stadion; Attendance: 2,216; Referee: Balázs Berke
Note: The match was originally scheduled for 19 August 2023, but was postponed due to Ferencváros's participation in European competition.

10 December 2023 16	Paks	3–2	Ferencváros	Paks
18:00 CET (UTC+1)	Papp 8'; Könyves 15'; Kovács (yellow card) 28'; Szélpál (yellow card) 38'; Kinyik (yellow card) 81'; B. Szabó 85' (pen.)	Report	Gojak (yellow card) 18'; Ćivić (yellow card) 25'; Leandro (not on pitch) (yellow card) 38'; Marquinhos 69'; Makreckis (red card) 78'; Ben Romdhane (yellow card) 79'; Stanković (not on pitch) (yellow card) 80'; Lisztes 88'	Stadium: Fehérvári úti Stadion; Attendance: 4,201; Referee: Sándor Andó-Szabó

17 December 2023 17	Ferencváros	3–0	Zalaegerszeg	Budapest
16:00 CET (UTC+1)	Lisztes 50', (yellow card) 88'; Aaneba 77'; Ben Romdhane 87'	Report	Evangelou (yellow card) 39'	Stadium: Groupama Arena; Attendance: 7,017; Referee: Mihály Káprály

3 February 2024 18	Kisvárda	1–3	Ferencváros	Kisvárda
15:00 CET (UTC+1)	Matić (yellow card) 11'; Mešanović 65'	Report	Abu Fani (yellow card) 32', (goal) 42'; Lončar 61'; Pešić 69'	Stadium: Várkerti Stadion; Attendance: 3,150; Referee: Ádám Farkas

6 February 2024 19	Ferencváros	5–1	MTK	Budapest
20:00 CET (UTC+1)	B. Varga 21', 52', 53', 56'; Lončar 66'; Bešić (yellow card) 87'	Report	Bognár 32'; Špalek (yellow card) 69'	Stadium: Groupama Arena; Attendance: 7,014; Referee: Gergő Bogár

10 February 2024 20	Debrecen	1–2	Ferencváros	Debrecen
17:30 CET (UTC+1)	Manrique 1'; Domingues (yellow card) 56'; Drešković (yellow card) 90+5'	Report	B. Varga 10'; Makreckis (yellow card) 36'; Zachariassen 74'	Stadium: Nagyerdei Stadion; Attendance: 12,114; Referee: Balázs Berke

25 February 2024 22	Újpest	0–5	Ferencváros	Budapest
17:30 CET (UTC+1)		Report	B. Varga 37', 45'; Lončar 65', (yellow card) 75'; Pešić 75', 83'; Marquinhos (yellow card) 90+3'	Stadium: Szusza Ferenc Stadion; Attendance: 11,202; Referee: Balázs Berke

3 March 2024 23	Ferencváros	2–0	Kecskemét	Budapest
16:30 CET (UTC+1)	Ben Romdhane (yellow card) 27'; Maïga 49'; Zachariassen 68'	Report	Helmich (yellow card) 7'; Lukács (yellow card) 20'; Vágó (yellow card) 49'	Stadium: Groupama Arena; Attendance: 11,112; Referee: Sándor Andó-Szabó

10 March 2024 24	Fehérvár	0–2	Ferencváros	Székesfehérvár
15:30 CET (UTC+1)				Stadium: MOL Aréna Sóstó; Referee: B. Berke

17 March 2024 25	Ferencváros	1–1	Puskás Akadémia	Budapest
14:45 CET (UTC+1)				Stadium: Groupama Arena; Referee: G. Bogár

30 March 2024 26	Mezőkövesd	0–3	Ferencváros	Mezőkövesd
CET (UTC+1)				Stadium: Városi Stadion; Attendance: 4,130; Referee: B. Csonka

6 April 2024 27	Ferencváros	1–0	Paks	Budapest
CEST (UTC+2)				Stadium: Groupama Arena; Attendance: 17,000; Referee: Karakó

10 April 2024 21	Ferencváros	2–1	Diósgyőr	Budapest
CEST (UTC+2)				Stadium: Groupama Arena; Referee: B. Berke
Note: The match was postponed due to Ferencváros's participation in European competition.

13 April 2024 28	Zalaegerszeg	2–3	Ferencváros	Zalaegerszeg
CEST (UTC+2)				Stadium: ZTE Arena

20 April 2024 29	Ferencváros	0–0	Kisvárda	Budapest
CEST (UTC+2)				Stadium: Groupama Arena

27 April 2024 30	MTK	1–2	Ferencváros	Budapest
CEST (UTC+2)				Stadium: Hidegkuti Nándor Stadion

4 May 2024 31	Ferencváros	5–1	Debrecen	Budapest
CEST (UTC+2)				Stadium: Groupama Arena

11 May 2024 32	Diósgyőr	2–0	Ferencváros	Miskolc
CEST (UTC+2)				Stadium: DVTK Stadion

18 May 2024 33	Ferencváros	2–0	Újpest	Budapest
CEST (UTC+2)				Stadium: Groupama Arena

=== Magyar Kupa ===
The draw for the round of 64 was held on 28 August 2023.

16 September 2023 Round of 64	Nagyecsed	0–8	Ferencváros	Nagyecsed
12:45 CEST (UTC+2)	Szabolcsi (yellow card) 12'	Report	Pešić 12' (pen.); Lisztes 15', 45'; Zachariassen 48'; Kwabena 51', 90+2'; Sigér 75'; Bešić 79'	Stadium: Nagyecsed RSE Sporttelep; Referee: László Lovas

1 November 2023 Round of 32	Ferencváros	4–3 (a.e.t.)	Puskás Akadémia	Budapest
20:00 CET (UTC+1)	Ćivić 35'; Aaneba 45+5'; Makreckis (yellow card) 104'; Traoré 114'; Abu Fani 120+11' (pen.)	Report	Gruber 9', 57'; Soisalo (yellow card) 97'; Golla (yellow card) 98'; Slagveer (yellow card) 100'; Plšek (yellow card) 104'; Favorov 120', (red card) 120+3'	Stadium: Groupama Arena; Attendance: 7,057; Referee: Balázs Berke

28 February 2024 Round of 16	Debrecen	1–1 (a.e.t.) (3–5 p)	Ferencváros	Debrecen
19:00 CET (UTC+1)	Baranyai (yellow card) 41'; Dzsudzsák (yellow card) 46'; Bárány (yellow card) 70', (goal) 80'; Drešković (yellow card) 85'	Report	Bešić (yellow card) 39'; Pešić 45+1' (pen.); Abena (red card) 46'; Ben Romdhane (yellow card) 58'; Stanković (not on pitch) (red card) 82'; Á. Varga (yellow card) 118'	Stadium: Nagyerdei Stadion; Attendance: 10,371; Referee: Ferenc Karakó
	Penalties
	Bódi (penalty scored); Kocsis (penalty missed); Szuhodovszki (penalty scored); Ferenczi (penalty scored)		(penalty scored) Kodro; (penalty scored) Abu Fani; (penalty scored) Ramírez; (penalty scored) Marquinhos; (penalty scored) Zachariassen
Note: Ferencváros won on penalty kicks 5–3.

3 April 2024 Quarter-finals	Diósgyőr	0–2	Ferencváros	Miskolc
--:-- CEST (UTC+2)				Stadium: DVTK Stadion

24 April 2024 Semi-finals	Nyíregyháza	1–2	Ferencváros	Balmazújváros
20:00 CEST (UTC+2)				Stadium: Balmazújvárosi Városi Sportpálya; Referee: Bogár

15 May 2024 Final	Paks	2–0	Ferencváros	Budapest
20:00 CEST (UTC+2)				Stadium: Puskás Aréna

=== UEFA Champions League ===
==== First qualifying round ====
11 July 2023 First leg	KÍ (Faroe Islands)	0–0	(Hungary) Ferencváros	Klaksvík, Faroe Islands
19:45 WEST (UTC+1)	da Silva (yellow card) 29'; Forren (yellow card) 82'	Report	Zachariassen (yellow card) 36'; Baráth (yellow card) 64'; Makreckis (yellow card) 90+5'	Stadium: Við Djúpumýrar; Attendance: 1,010; Referee: Juri Frischer (Estonia)

19 July 2023 Second leg	Ferencváros (Hungary)	0–3 (0–3 agg.)	(Faroe Islands) KÍ	Budapest, Hungary
18:00 CEST (UTC+2)	Botka (yellow card) 79'; S. Mmaee (yellow card) 86'; Abu Fani (yellow card) 88'	Report	Ar. Frederiksberg 8' (pen.), 32'; Kassi 45+1'	Stadium: Ferencváros Stadion; Attendance: 18,187; Referee: David Smajc (Slovenia)
Note: KÍ won 3–0 on aggregate.

=== UEFA Europa Conference League ===
==== Second qualifying round ====
27 July 2023 First leg	Ferencváros (Hungary)	4–0	(Republic of Ireland) Shamrock Rovers	Budapest, Hungary
19:00 CEST (UTC+2)	Sigér 16'; Ramírez 32'; Traoré 47'; B. Varga 74'; Esiti (yellow card) 90+2'	Report	Hoare (yellow card) 50'; Finn (yellow card) 57'	Stadium: Ferencváros Stadion; Attendance: 10,735; Referee: Ashot Ghaltakhchyan (Armenia)

3 August 2023 Second leg	Shamrock Rovers (Republic of Ireland)	0–2 (0–6 agg.)	(Hungary) Ferencváros	Tallaght, Ireland
20:00 IST (UTC+1)		Report	Sigér (yellow card) 3'; Zachariassen 31'; B. Varga (yellow card) 50'; S. Mmaee 90'	Stadium: Tallaght Stadium; Attendance: 3,737; Referee: Tomasz Musiał (Poland)
Note: Ferencváros won 6–0 on aggregate.

==== Third qualifying round ====
10 August 2023 First leg	Ħamrun Spartans (Malta)	1–6	(Hungary) Ferencváros	Ta' Qali, Malta
CEST (UTC+2)	Prša (yellow card) 32'; Nenov (yellow card) 37'; Borg (yellow card) 66'; Montebello (yellow card) 70', (goal) 89'	Report	Abu Fani 3'; Makreckis (yellow card) 45'; Zachariassen 51'; B. Varga 53', 56', 65'; Owusu 90'	Stadium: Centenary Stadium (Note: The match was played at the Centenary Stadium in Ta' Qali, instead of their regular stadium, the Victor Tedesco Stadium in Hamrun, which did not meet UEFA requirements.); Attendance: 2,244; Referee: Eldorjan Hamiti (Albania)

17 August 2023 Second leg	Ferencváros (Hungary)	2–1 (8–2 agg.)	(Malta) Ħamrun Spartans	Budapest, Hungary
19:00 CEST (UTC+2)	Traoré 41'; B. Varga 69'	Report	Mbong 6', (yellow card) 25'; Bjeličić (yellow card) 55'; Corbalan (yellow card) 90+2'	Stadium: Ferencváros Stadion; Attendance: 11,375; Referee: Georgi Davidov (Bulgaria)
Note: Ferencváros won 8–2 on aggregate.

==== Play-off round ====
24 August 2023 First leg	Žalgiris (Lithuania)	0–4	(Hungary) Ferencváros	Vilnius, Lithuania
19:00 EEST (UTC+3)	Gorobsov (red card) 63'	Report	Traoré 17', 84'; B. Varga (yellow card) 31', (goal) 65' (pen.); Leandro (not on pitch) (yellow card) 71'; Pešić 75'	Stadium: LFF Stadium; Attendance: 3,151; Referee: Igor Stojchevski (North Macedonia)

31 August 2023 Second leg	Ferencváros (Hungary)	3–0 (7–0 agg.)	(Lithuania) Žalgiris	Budapest, Hungary
20:00 CEST (UTC+2)	Traoré 4', 48'; Marquinhos (yellow card) 38'; B. Varga 42' (pen.); Makreckis (yellow card) 90+2'	Report		Stadium: Ferencváros Stadion; Attendance: 12,073; Referee: Urs Schnyder (Switzerland)
Note: Ferencváros won 7–0 on aggregate.

==== Group stage ====
The draw for the group stage was held on 1 September 2023.

Pos	Team	Pld	W	D	L	GF	GA	GD	Pts	Qualification	FIO	FER	GNK	ČUK
1	(Italy) Fiorentina	6	3	3	0	14	6	+8	12	Advance to round of 16	—	2–2	2–1	6–0
2	(Hungary) Ferencváros	6	2	4	0	9	6	+3	10	Advance to knockout round play-offs	1–1	—	1–1	3–1
3	(Belgium) Genk	6	2	3	1	8	5	+3	9		2–2	0–0	—	2–0
4	(Serbia) Čukarički	6	0	0	6	2	16	−14	0		0–1	1–2	0–2	—

Source: UEFA
Rules for classification: Group stage tiebreakers

21 September 2023 1	Ferencváros (Hungary)	3–1	(Serbia) Čukarički	Budapest, Hungary
18:45 CEST (UTC+2)	B. Varga 44' (pen.); Kwabena 45+7'; S. Mmaee (yellow card) 50'; Pešić 79'	Report	Docić (yellow card) 19'; Ivanović 26', (yellow card) 41'; Kovač (yellow card) 33'; Adetunji (yellow card) 45+3'; Subotić (yellow card) 66'	Stadium: Ferencváros Stadion; Attendance: 17,859; Referee: Guillermo Cuadra Fernández (Spain)

5 October 2023 2	Fiorentina (Italy)	2–2	(Hungary) Ferencváros	Florence, Italy
21:00 CEST (UTC+2)	Barák 66'; González (yellow card) 86'; Ikoné 90+3'; Italiano (not on pitch) (yellow card) 90+5'	Report	Sigér (yellow card) 23'; B. Varga 25', (yellow card) 57'; Cissé 50'; S. Mmaee (yellow card) 55'; Ben Romdhane (yellow card) 66'; Dibusz (yellow card) 70'; Sakić (not on pitch) (yellow card) 90+1'	Stadium: Stadio Artemio Franchi; Attendance: 20,367; Referee: Daniel Schlager (Germany)

26 October 2023 3	Genk (Belgium)	0–0	(Hungary) Ferencváros	Genk, Belgium
21:00 CEST (UTC+2)	Arteaga (yellow card) 29'; El Khannous (yellow card) 59'; Arokodare (red card) 90'	Report	Botka (yellow card) 40'	Stadium: Cegeka Arena; Attendance: 15,357; Referee: Aleksandar Stavrev (North Macedonia)

9 November 2023 4	Ferencváros (Hungary)	1–1	(Belgium) Genk	Budapest, Hungary
18:45 CET (UTC+1)	Pešić 48'; Abu Fani (yellow card) 80'	Report	Sadick (yellow card) 43'; El Khannous (yellow card) 55'; Muñoz (yellow card) 58', (goal) 62'; Paintsil (yellow card) 74'	Stadium: Ferencváros Stadion; Attendance: 20,127; Referee: Aleksei Kulbakov (Belarus)

30 November 2023 5	Čukarički (Serbia)	1–2	(Hungary) Ferencváros	Leskovac, Serbia
21:00 CET (UTC+1)	Adžić 11'; Stankovic (not on pitch) (yellow card) 73'; Nikčević (yellow card) 74'; Stanković (yellow card) 90+4'; Matić (not on pitch) (yellow card) 90+7' (yellow-red card) 90+9'; Tošić (yellow card) 90+9'; V. Jovanović (yellow card) 90+9' (yellow-red card) 90+11'	Report	Abena (yellow card) 44'; Abu Fani (yellow card) 74'; Zachariassen 83', (yellow card) 90+7'; Pešić 90+8', (yellow card) 90+9'	Stadium: Dubočica Stadium (Note: The match was played at the Dubočica Stadium in Leskovac, instead of their regular stadium, the Čukarički Stadium in Belgrade, which did not meet UEFA requirements.); Attendance: 1,389; Referee: Mohammed Al-Emara (Finland)

14 December 2023 6	Ferencváros (Hungary)	1–1	(Italy) Fiorentina	Budapest, Hungary
18:45 CET (UTC+1)	Zachariassen 48'; Cissé (yellow card) 60'	Report	Mandragora (yellow card) 10'; Milenković (yellow card) 31'; Ranieri 73'	Stadium: Ferencváros Stadion; Attendance: 20,657; Referee: Luis Godinho (Portugal)

==== Knockout phase ====
===== Knockout round play-offs =====
15 February 2024 First leg	Olympiacos (Greece)	1–0	(Hungary) Ferencváros	Piraeus, Greece
19:45 EET (UTC+2)	Alexandropoulos (yellow card) 51'; Carmo (yellow card) 61'; El Kaabi 83'	Report	Makreckis (yellow card) 37'; Wingo (yellow card) 77'; Stanković (not on pitch) (yellow card) 87'; Ben Romdhane (yellow card) 90'	Stadium: Karaiskakis Stadium; Attendance: 30,300; Referee: Glenn Nyberg (Sweden)

22 February 2024 Second leg	Ferencváros (Hungary)	0–1 (0–2 agg.)	(Greece) Olympiacos	Budapest, Hungary
21:00 CET (UTC+1)	B. Varga (yellow card) 42'; Abu Fani (yellow card) 87'	Report	El Kaabi 45' (pen.)	Stadium: Ferencváros Stadion; Attendance: 21,057; Referee: Clément Turpin (France)
Note: Olympiacos won 2–0 on aggregate.
