= 2022–23 FC Chornomorets Odesa season =

FC Chornomorets Odesa
2022–23 season
- Owner: Vertex United
- General Director: Anatoly Mysyura
- Manager: Roman Hryhorchuk
- Stadium: Chornomorets Stadium
- Ukrainian Premier League: 10th of 16
- Top goalscorer: League: Danyil Alefirenko (8); All: Danyil Alefirenko (8)
Home colours	Away colours

The 2022–23 season was the 85th season in the club's history and the 32nd season of Odesa football club Chornomorets in the domestic league/cup of Ukraine. The Sailors competed in the 2022–23 Ukrainian Premier League.

== Season overview ==
Note: Only the date of an official match is marked in bold.

=== July 2022 ===
==== Pre-season and friendlies ====
- 9 July 2022 Zimbru – Chornomorets 0–3.

=== August 2022 ===
- **23 August 2022** In the 1st round of the Ukrainian Premier League, playing in Kyiv, Chornomorets lost 0–1 to Veres.
- **27 August 2022** In the 2nd round of the Ukrainian Premier League, playing in Kyiv, the Sailors drew Metalist 1925 0–0.

=== September 2022 ===
- **4 September 2022** In the 3rd round of the Ukrainian Premier League, Chornomorets played Inhulets to a 1–1 draw.
- **10 September 2022** In the 4th round of the Ukrainian Premier League, playing in Lviv, the Sailors lost 1–2 to Shakhtar Donetsk.

=== October 2022 ===
- **2 October 2022** In the 5th round of the Ukrainian Premier League, playing in Kovalivka, Chornomorets lost 1–2 to FC Oleksandriia.
- **8 October 2022** In the 6th round of the Ukrainian Premier League, playing in Mynai, the Sailors lost 1–2 against Vorskla.
- **18 October 2022** In the 8th round of the Ukrainian Premier League, playing in Kovalivka, Chornomorets lost 0–4 to Zorya.
- **24 October 2022** In the 9th round of the Ukrainian Premier League, playing in Kovalivka, the Sailors drew 1–1 local club Kolos.
- **30 October 2022** In the 10th round of the Ukrainian Premier League, playing in Uzhhorod, Chornomorets lost 0–1 to Dnipro-1.

=== November 2022 ===
- **6 November 2022** In the 11th round of the Ukrainian Premier League, playing at home, the Sailors lost 0–3 to Dynamo Kyiv.
- **10 November 2022** In the 12th round of the Ukrainian Premier League, Chornomorets played in Mynai against local club FC Mynai and won 1–0.
- **14 November 2022** In the 13th round of the Ukrainian Premier League, playing at home, the Sailors outlasted FC Lviv, winning 2–0. Vitaliy Yermakov and Maksym Voytikhovskyi scored their first goals for Chornomorets.
- **25 November 2022** In the 14th round of the Ukrainian Premier League, playing at home, Chornomorets drew 0–0 Metalist Kharkiv.

=== December 2022 ===
- **2 December 2022** In the postponed 7th round of the Ukrainian Premier League, playing at home, the Sailors lost 0–1 to Kryvbas Kryvyi Rih.
- **7 December 2022** In the postponed 14th round of the Ukrainian Premier League, playing in Lviv, Chornomorets drew 2–2 local club Rukh.

=== January 2023 ===
Friendlies

- 15 January 2023 Chornomorets – Real Pharma Odesa 4–1
- 21 January 2023 Chornomorets – Spartak Varna 1–1
- 26 January 2023 Chornomorets – Novi Pazar 0–2
- 29 January 2023 Chornomorets – Lokomotiv Tashkent 1–3; Chornomorets – Malisheva 0–1

=== February 2023 ===
Friendlies

- 2 February 2023 Chornomorets – Shakhter Karagandy 2–1
- 5 February 2023 Chornomorets – Turon 4–2
- 15 February 2023 Chornomorets – Nyva Vinnytsia 4–2
- 18 February 2023 Chornomorets – Real Pharma Odesa 5–0

=== March 2023 ===
- **4 March 2023** In the 16th round of the Ukrainian Premier League, playing in Rivne, the Sailors outlasted NK Veres, winning 3–1. Badibanga, Alefirenko and Hladkyi scored their first goals for Chornomorets. Badibanga scored his first goal in UPL matches.
- **11 March 2023** In the 17th round of the Ukrainian Premier League, playing at home, Chornomorets drew 1–1 Metalist 1925.
- 13 March 2023 The Sailors suspended cooperation with its sponsor Parimatch.
- **19 March 2023** In the 18th round of the Ukrainian Premier League, playing in Petrove, Chornomorets outlasted Inhulets, winning 2–1. Hadida scored his first goal for Chornomorets.

=== April 2023 ===
- **2 April 2023** In the 19th round of the Ukrainian Premier League, playing at home, the Sailors drew 2–2 Shakhtar from Donetsk. Salyuk scored his first goal for Chornomorets.
- **9 April 2023** In the 20th round of the Ukrainian Premier League, playing in Oleksandriia, Chornomorets drew 1–1 FC Oleksandriya.
- **16 April 2023** In the 21st round of the Ukrainian Premier League, playing at home, the Sailors lost 0–1 to FC Vorskla Poltava.
- **23 April 2023** In the 22nd round of the Ukrainian Premier League, Chornomorets played in Kryvyi Rih against local club FC Kryvbas and won 3–2. Orest Kuzyk scored his first goals for Chornomorets.
- **29 April 2023** In the 23rd round of the Ukrainian Premier League, playing in Kyiv, the Sailors lost 1–3 to FC Zorya.

=== May 2023 ===
- **3 May 2023** In the 24th round of the Ukrainian Premier League, playing at home, Chornomorets outlasted FC Kolos, winning 3–0. Oleksandr Demchenko scored his first goals for Chornomorets.
- **7 May 2023** In the 25th round of the Ukrainian Premier League, playing at home, the Sailors lost 1–2 to Dnipro-1.
- **13 May 2023** In the 26th round of the Ukrainian Premier League, playing in Kyiv, Chornomorets outlasted FC Dynamo Kyiv, winning 3–2.
- **20 May 2023** In the 27th round of the Ukrainian Premier League, playing at home, the Sailors lost 0–1 to FC Mynai.
- **25 May 2023** In the 28th round of the Ukrainian Premier League, Chornomorets played in Lviv against local club FC Lviv and won 1–0.
- **29 May 2023** In the 29th round of the Ukrainian Premier League, playing at home, the Sailors lost 1–3 to FC Rukh.

=== June 2023 ===
- **4 June 2023** In the 30th round of the Ukrainian Premier League FC Metalist hosted Chornomorets in Odesa. Chornomorets won 3–0.

== Competitions ==
=== Ukrainian Premier League ===
==== Results summary ====
Overall								Home						Away					
Pld	W	D	L	GF	GA	GD	Pts	W	D	L	GF	GA	GD	W	D	L	GF	GA	GD
30	9	8	13	35	40	−5	35	2	4	9	12	22	−10	7	4	4	23	18	+5

Last updated: June 2023.
Source: Soccerway

==== Results by round ====
Round	1	2	3	4	5	6	7	8	9	10	11	12	13	14	15	16	17	18	19	20	21	22	23	24	25	26	27	28	29	30
Ground	H	A	H	A	H	A	H	H	A	A	H	A	H	A	H	A	H	A	H	A	H	A	A	H	H	A	H	A	H	A
Result	L	D	D	L	L	L	L	L	D	L	L	W	W	D	D	W	D	W	D	D	L	W	L	W	L	W	L	W	L	W
Position	15	12	12	14	15	16	16	16	16	16	16	16	15	15	15	14	14	11	11	11	12	11	12	11	11	9	10	9	10	9

Updated to match(es) played on June 2023. Source: Soccerway
A = Away; H = Home; W = Win; D = Draw; L = Loss
