= 2023–24 UEFA Europa Conference League group stage =

The 2023–24 UEFA Europa Conference League group stage began on 20 September 2023 and ended on 14 December 2023. A total of 32 teams competed in the group stage to decide 8 of the 16 places in the knockout phase of the 2023–24 UEFA Europa Conference League.

All teams besides AZ, Ballkani, Bodø/Glimt, Fiorentina, Gent, HJK, Maccabi Tel Aviv, PAOK, Slovan Bratislava and Zorya Luhansk made their debut appearances in the group stage. Breiðablik, Čukarički, KÍ, Olimpija Ljubljana and Zrinjski Mostar made their debut appearances in a UEFA competition group stage. Breiðablik, KÍ and Zrinjski Mostar were the first teams from Iceland, the Faroe Islands and Bosnia and Herzegovina, respectively, to play in a UEFA competition group stage. Breiðablik also became the first ever team to qualify for the group stages of a UEFA club competition after starting in a preliminary round.

A total of 28 national associations were represented in the group stage .

This was the final season with the group stage format, which was replaced by the league phase format starting from the next season.

== Draw ==
The draw for the group stage was held on 1 September 2023, 14:30 CEST, in Monaco. The 32 teams were drawn into eight groups of four. For the draw, the teams were seeded into four pots, each of eight teams, based on their 2023 UEFA club coefficients. Teams from the same association could not be drawn into the same group. Prior to the draw, UEFA formed pairings of teams from the same association, including those playing in the Europa League group stage (one pairing for associations with two or three teams, two pairings for associations with four or five teams), based on television audiences, where one team was into Groups A–D and another team was drawn into Groups E–H, so that the two teams would have different kick-off times. The following pairings were announced by UEFA after the group stage teams were confirmed (the second team in a pairing marked by UEL played in the Europa League group stage):

3. (Netherlands) AZ and Ajax (UEL)
6. (Scotland) Aberdeen and Rangers (UEL)
11. (Norway) Bodø/Glimt and Molde (UEL)
12. (England) Aston Villa and Brighton & Hove Albion (UEL)
13. (Belgium) Club Brugge and Union Saint-Gilloise (UEL)
14. (Israel) Maccabi Tel Aviv and Maccabi Haifa (UEL)
15. (France) Lille and Toulouse (UEL)
16. (Greece) PAOK and AEK Athens (UEL)
17. (Serbia) Čukarički and TSC (UEL)
18. (Switzerland) Lugano and Servette (UEL)
19. (Poland) Legia Warsaw and Raków Częstochowa (UEL)
20. (Belgium) Gent and Genk
21. (Turkey) Fenerbahçe and Beşiktaş
22. (Slovakia) Slovan Bratislava and Spartak Trnava

== Teams ==
Below were the participating teams (with their 2023 UEFA club coefficients), grouped by their seeding pot. They included:

- 22 winners of the play-off round (5 from Champions Path, 17 from Main Path)
- 10 losers of the Europa League play-off round

Key to colours
Group winners advanced directly to round of 16
Group runners-up advanced to knockout round play-offs

Pot 1
Team	Notes	Coeff.
(Germany) Eintracht Frankfurt		77.000
(Croatia) Dinamo Zagreb		55.000
(Belgium) Club Brugge		54.000
(Netherlands) AZ		47.500
(Belgium) Gent		37.500
(Turkey) Fenerbahçe		30.000
(France) Lille		30.000
(Hungary) Ferencváros		27.000

Pot 2
Team	Notes	Coeff.
(Greece) PAOK		25.000
(Slovakia) Slovan Bratislava		24.500
(Israel) Maccabi Tel Aviv		24.000
(Czech Republic) Viktoria Plzeň		22.000
(England) Aston Villa		21.914
(Bulgaria) Ludogorets Razgrad		21.000
(Italy) Fiorentina		20.000
(Norway) Bodø/Glimt		20.000

Pot 3
Team	Notes	Coeff.
(Belgium) Genk		18.000
(Ukraine) Zorya Luhansk		16.000
(Kazakhstan) Astana		14.000
(Turkey) Beşiktaş		14.000
(Finland) HJK		11.000
(Poland) Legia Warsaw		11.000
(Slovakia) Spartak Trnava		10.500
(Slovenia) Olimpija Ljubljana		9.000

Pot 4
Team	Notes	Coeff.
(Bosnia and Herzegovina) Zrinjski Mostar		8.500
(Faroe Islands) KÍ		8.000
(Scotland) Aberdeen		8.000
(Serbia) Čukarički		6.475
(Switzerland) Lugano		6.335
(Iceland) Breiðablik		6.000
(Denmark) Nordsjælland		5.565
(Kosovo) Ballkani		3.000

Notes

1. ^{ECL-CP} Winners of play-off round (Champions Path).
2. ^{ECL-MP} Winners of play-off round (Main Path).
3. ^{EL-PO} Losers of Europa League play-off round

== Format ==
In each group, teams played against each other home-and-away in a round-robin format. The winners of each group advanced to the round of 16, while the runners-up advanced to the knockout round play-offs. The third-placed and fourth-placed teams were eliminated from European competitions for the season.

=== Tiebreakers ===
Teams were ranked according to points (3 points for a win, 1 point for a draw, 0 points for a loss). If two or more teams were tied on points, the following tiebreaking criteria were applied, in the order given, to determine the rankings (see Article 16 Equality of points – group stage, Regulations of the UEFA Europa Conference League):

1. Points in head-to-head matches among the tied teams;
2. Goal difference in head-to-head matches among the tied teams;
3. Goals scored in head-to-head matches among the tied teams;
4. If more than two teams were tied, and after applying all head-to-head criteria above, a subset of teams were still tied, all head-to-head criteria above were reapplied exclusively to this subset of teams;
5. Goal difference in all group matches;
6. Goals scored in all group matches;
7. Away goals scored in all group matches;
8. Wins in all group matches;
9. Away wins in all group matches;
10. Disciplinary points (direct red card = 3 points; double yellow card = 3 points; single yellow card = 1 point);
11. UEFA club coefficient.

== Groups ==
The fixtures were announced on 2 September 2023, the day after the draw. The matches were played on 20–21 September, 5 October, 26 October, 9 November, 30 November and 14 December 2023. The scheduled kick-off times were 18:45 and 21:00 CET/CEST, with possible exceptions at 16:30 CET/CEST due to geographical reasons.

Times are CET/CEST, (Note: CEST (UTC+2) for dates up to 26 October 2023 (matchdays 1–3), and CET (UTC+1) for date thereafter (matchdays 4–6).) as listed by UEFA (local times, if different, are in parentheses).

=== Group A ===
Pos	Team	Pld	W	D	L	GF	GA	GD	Pts	Qualification	LOSC	SLO	LJU	KÍ
1	(France) Lille	6	4	2	0	10	2	+8	14	Advance to round of 16	—	2–1	2–0	3–0
2	(Slovakia) Slovan Bratislava	6	3	1	2	8	7	+1	10	Advance to knockout round play-offs	1–1	—	1–2	2–1
3	(Slovenia) Olimpija Ljubljana	6	2	0	4	4	9	−5	6		0–2	0–1	—	2–0
4	(Faroe Islands) KÍ	6	1	1	4	5	9	−4	4		0–0	1–2	3–0	—

Source: UEFA
Rules for classification: Group stage tiebreakers
20 September 2023 (Note: The Lille v Olimpija Ljubljana match was played on Wednesday instead of Thursday to allow enough time for the stadium's pitch to be mended prior to hosting a Rugby World Cup match.)
16:30

Lille (France)	2–0	(Slovenia) Olimpija Ljubljana
David 43' (pen.); Yazıcı 90+4'	Report

Stade Pierre-Mauroy, Villeneuve-d'Ascq
Attendance: 13,817
Referee: Joey Kooij (Netherlands)
21 September 2023
21:00

Slovan Bratislava (Slovakia)	2–1	(Faroe Islands) KÍ
Weiss 54'; Čavrić 74'	Report	Pavlović 48'

Tehelné pole, Bratislava
Attendance: 12,454
Referee: Christian-Petru Ciochirca (Austria)

5 October 2023
18:45

Olimpija Ljubljana (Slovenia)	0–1	(Slovakia) Slovan Bratislava
	Report	Čavrić 55' (pen.)

Stožice Stadium, Ljubljana
Attendance: 5,064
Referee: Anastasios Sidiropoulos (Greece)
5 October 2023
18:45 (17:45 UTC+1)

KÍ (Faroe Islands)	0–0	(France) Lille
	Report

Tórsvøllur, Tórshavn (Note: KÍ played their home matches at the Tórsvøllur, in Tórshavn, instead of their regular stadium, Við Djúpumýrar, in Klaksvík, which did not meet UEFA requirements.)
Attendance: 2,191
Referee: Elchin Masiyev (Azerbaijan)

26 October 2023
18:45

Lille (France)	2–1	(Slovakia) Slovan Bratislava
Yazıcı 68'; Cabella 82'	Report	Čavrić 23'

Stade Pierre-Mauroy, Villeneuve-d'Ascq
Attendance: 19,610
Referee: Luca Pairetto (Italy)
26 October 2023
18:45 (17:45 UTC+1)

KÍ (Faroe Islands)	3–0	(Slovenia) Olimpija Ljubljana
Joensen 30'; Klettskarð 44'; J. Andreasen 54'	Report

Tórsvøllur, Tórshavn
Attendance: 1,121
Referee: Harm Osmers (Germany)

9 November 2023
21:00

Slovan Bratislava (Slovakia)	1–1	(France) Lille
Čavrić 81'	Report	Gomes 53'

Tehelné pole, Bratislava
Attendance: 21,544
Referee: Gergő Bogár (Hungary)
9 November 2023
21:00

Olimpija Ljubljana (Slovenia)	2–0	(Faroe Islands) KÍ
Sualehe 84'; Nukić 88'	Report

Stožice Stadium, Ljubljana
Attendance: 2,296
Referee: Philip Farrugia (Malta)

30 November 2023
18:45

Olimpija Ljubljana (Slovenia)	0–2	(France) Lille
	Report	Cabella 15'; Yazıcı 75'

Stožice Stadium, Ljubljana
Attendance: 4,053
Referee: Sven Jablonski (Germany)
30 November 2023
18:45 (17:45 UTC+0)

KÍ (Faroe Islands)	1–2	(Slovakia) Slovan Bratislava
Mikkelsen 17'	Report	Kucka 24', 62'

Tórsvøllur, Tórshavn
Attendance: 1,249
Referee: Kristo Tohver (Estonia)

14 December 2023
21:00

Slovan Bratislava (Slovakia)	1–2	(Slovenia) Olimpija Ljubljana
Blackman 27'	Report	Pedro Lucas 17', 58'

Tehelné pole, Bratislava
Attendance: 14,387
Referee: Arda Kardeşler (Turkey)
14 December 2023
21:00

Lille (France)	3–0	(Faroe Islands) KÍ
Yazıcı 29' (pen.); Gomes 87' (pen.); Zhegrova 90+6' (pen.)	Report

Stade Pierre-Mauroy, Villeneuve-d'Ascq
Attendance: 20,061
Referee: António Nobre (Portugal)

=== Group B ===
Pos	Team	Pld	W	D	L	GF	GA	GD	Pts	Qualification	MTA	GNT	ZOR	BRE
1	(Israel) Maccabi Tel Aviv	6	5	0	1	14	9	+5	15	Advance to round of 16	—	3–1	3–2	3–2
2	(Belgium) Gent	6	4	1	1	16	7	+9	13	Advance to knockout round play-offs	2–0	—	4–1	5–0
3	(Ukraine) Zorya Luhansk	6	2	1	3	10	11	−1	7		1–3	1–1	—	4–0
4	(Iceland) Breiðablik	6	0	0	6	5	18	−13	0		1–2	2–3	0–1	—

Source: UEFA
Rules for classification: Group stage tiebreakers
21 September 2023
21:00 (22:00 UTC+3)

Maccabi Tel Aviv (Israel)	3–2	(Iceland) Breiðablik
Maçon 11'; Zahavi 24'; Biton 32'	Report	Olsen 44', 55'

Bloomfield Stadium, Tel Aviv
Attendance: 18,558
Referee: Vitālijs Spasjoņņikovs (Latvia)
21 September 2023
21:00

Zorya Luhansk (Ukraine)	1–1	(Belgium) Gent
Guerrero 70'	Report	Cuypers 67'

Arena Lublin, Lublin, Poland (Note: Due to the Russian invasion of Ukraine, Ukrainian teams were required to play their home matches at neutral venues until further notice.)
Attendance: 539
Referee: Daniele Chiffi (Italy)

5 October 2023
18:45 (16:45 UTC+0)

Breiðablik (Iceland)	0–1	(Ukraine) Zorya Luhansk
	Report	Horbach 35'

Laugardalsvöllur, Reykjavík (Note: Breiðablik played their first two home matches at the Laugardalsvöllur, in Reykjavík, instead of their regular stadium, Kópavogsvöllur, in Kópavogur, which did not meet UEFA requirements.)
Attendance: 1,738
Referee: Aleksandar Stavrev (North Macedonia)
5 October 2023
18:45

Gent (Belgium)	2–0	(Israel) Maccabi Tel Aviv
Tissoudali 39', 90+2' (pen.)	Report

Ghelamco Arena, Ghent
Attendance: 10,503
Referee: Abdulkadir Bitigen (Turkey)

26 October 2023
18:45

Gent (Belgium)	5–0	(Iceland) Breiðablik
Gandelman 10'; Cuypers 15', 19'; Tissoudali 43'; Orban 69'	Report

Ghelamco Arena, Ghent
Attendance: 9,907
Referee: Robertas Valikonis (Lithuania)

9 November 2023
21:00 (20:00 UTC+0)

Breiðablik (Iceland)	2–3	(Belgium) Gent
Svanþórsson 16', 18'	Report	Orban 6', 54' (pen.), 69'

Laugardalsvöllur, Reykjavík
Attendance: 1,211
Referee: Julian Weinberger (Austria)
9 November 2023
21:00

Zorya Luhansk (Ukraine)	1–3	(Israel) Maccabi Tel Aviv
Alefirenko 74'	Report	Luckassen 7'; Peretz 26', 43'

Arena Lublin, Lublin, Poland
Attendance: 763
Referee: John Beaton (Scotland)

25 November 2023 (Note: The Maccabi Tel Aviv v Zorya Luhansk match, originally scheduled to be played on 26 October 2023, was rescheduled to 25 November 2023.)
18:45

Maccabi Tel Aviv (Israel)	3–2	(Ukraine) Zorya Luhansk
Zahavi 45+2'; Peretz 46', 60'	Report	Guerrero 71'; Horbach 88'

TSC Arena, Bačka Topola, Serbia (Note: Due to the Gaza war, Maccabi Tel Aviv played their remaining home matches at a neutral venue.)
Attendance: 0 (Note: The match was played behind closed doors.)
Referee: Lukas Fähndrich (Switzerland)

30 November 2023
14:00 (13:00 UTC+0)

Breiðablik (Iceland)	1–2	(Israel) Maccabi Tel Aviv
Eyjólfsson 61'	Report	Biton 35'; Zahavi 82'

Kópavogsvöllur, Kópavogur
Attendance: 629
Referee: Luka Bilbija (Bosnia and Herzegovina)
30 November 2023
18:45

Gent (Belgium)	4–1	(Ukraine) Zorya Luhansk
Fofana 20'; Batahov 49' (o.g.); Orban 55'; Gandelman 75'	Report	Nahnoinyi 82'

Ghelamco Arena, Ghent
Attendance: 10,303
Referee: Evangelos Manouchos (Greece)

14 December 2023
21:00

Maccabi Tel Aviv (Israel)	3–1	(Belgium) Gent
Kanichowsky 9'; Zahavi 24', 61'	Report	De Sart 49'

TSC Arena, Bačka Topola, Serbia
Attendance: 0
Referee: Jesús Gil Manzano (Spain)
14 December 2023
21:00

Zorya Luhansk (Ukraine)	4–0	(Iceland) Breiðablik
Guerrero 2'; Muminovic 11' (o.g.); Mićin 19'; Horbach 76'	Report

Arena Lublin, Lublin, Poland
Attendance: 442
Referee: Tomáš Klíma (Czech Republic)

=== Group C ===
Pos	Team	Pld	W	D	L	GF	GA	GD	Pts	Qualification	PLZ	DZG	AST	BAL
1	(Czech Republic) Viktoria Plzeň	6	6	0	0	9	1	+8	18	Advance to round of 16	—	1–0	3–0	1–0
2	(Croatia) Dinamo Zagreb	6	3	0	3	10	5	+5	9	Advance to knockout round play-offs	0–1	—	5–1	3–0
3	(Kazakhstan) Astana	6	1	1	4	4	13	−9	4 (Note: Ranked on head-to-head points: Astana 4, Ballkani 1.)		1–2	0–2	—	0–0
4	(Kosovo) Ballkani	6	1	1	4	3	7	−4	4		0–1	2–0	1–2	—

Source: UEFA
Rules for classification: Group stage tiebreakers
Notes:
21 September 2023
21:00

Viktoria Plzeň (Czech Republic)	1–0	(Kosovo) Ballkani
Kalvach 73'	Report

Doosan Arena, Plzeň
Attendance: 9,562
Referee: Damian Sylwestrzak (Poland)
21 September 2023
21:00

Dinamo Zagreb (Croatia)	5–1	(Kazakhstan) Astana
Petković 43' (pen.), 53' (pen.); Bulat 58'; Marin 85'; Halilović 90+3'	Report	Hovhannisyan 78'

Stadion Maksimir, Zagreb
Attendance: 10,005
Referee: Paweł Raczkowski (Poland)

5 October 2023
16:30 (20:30 UTC+6)

Astana (Kazakhstan)	1–2	(Czech Republic) Viktoria Plzeň
Tomasov 51'	Report	Chorý 54'; Kopic 57'

Astana Arena, Astana
Attendance: 24,421
Referee: Gustavo Correia (Portugal)
5 October 2023
18:45

Ballkani (Kosovo)	2–0	(Croatia) Dinamo Zagreb
Kryeziu 44'; Hamidi 83'	Report

Fadil Vokrri Stadium, Pristina (Note: Ballkani played their home matches at the Fadil Vokrri Stadium, in Pristina, instead of their regular stadium, the Theranda City Stadium, in Suva Reka, which did not meet UEFA requirements.)
Attendance: 9,654
Referee: Atilla Karaoğlan (Turkey)

26 October 2023
18:45

Ballkani (Kosovo)	1–2	(Kazakhstan) Astana
Kuč 8'	Report	Hovhannisyan 7'; Beysebekov 23'

Fadil Vokrri Stadium, Pristina
Attendance: 7,208
Referee: Vasilios Fotias (Greece)
26 October 2023
21:00

Dinamo Zagreb (Croatia)	0–1	(Czech Republic) Viktoria Plzeň
	Report	Chorý 69' (pen.)

Stadion Maksimir, Zagreb
Attendance: 8,407
Referee: Robert Jones (England)

9 November 2023
16:30 (21:30 UTC+6)

Astana (Kazakhstan)	0–0	(Kosovo) Ballkani
	Report

Astana Arena, Astana
Attendance: 15,337
Referee: Balázs Berke (Hungary)
9 November 2023
18:45

Viktoria Plzeň (Czech Republic)	1–0	(Croatia) Dinamo Zagreb
Chorý 35' (pen.)	Report

Doosan Arena, Plzeň
Attendance: 11,084
Referee: Anastasios Sidiropoulos (Greece)

30 November 2023
16:30 (21:30 UTC+6)

Astana (Kazakhstan)	0–2	(Croatia) Dinamo Zagreb
	Report	Vidović 48'; Kaneko 79'

Astana Arena, Astana
Attendance: 20,313
Referee: John Beaton (Scotland)
30 November 2023
18:45

Ballkani (Kosovo)	0–1	(Czech Republic) Viktoria Plzeň
	Report	Šulc 81'

Arena Kombëtare, Tirana, Albania (Note: Ballkani played their last home match at the Arena Kombëtare, Tirana, Albania, instead of their pre-selected stadium, the Fadil Vokrri Stadium, Pristina, due to deteriorated pitch conditions following recent matches.)
Attendance: 2,200
Referee: Marian Barbu (Romania)

14 December 2023
21:00

Viktoria Plzeň (Czech Republic)	3–0	(Kazakhstan) Astana
Vlkanova 58'; Mosquera 67', 82'	Report

Doosan Arena, Plzeň
Attendance: 8,135
Referee: Willy Delajod (France)
14 December 2023
21:00

Dinamo Zagreb (Croatia)	3–0	(Kosovo) Ballkani
Perić 69'; Petković 72', 77' (pen.)	Report

Stadion Maksimir, Zagreb
Attendance: 6,048
Referee: Ricardo de Burgos Bengoetxea (Spain)

=== Group D ===
Pos	Team	Pld	W	D	L	GF	GA	GD	Pts	Qualification	BRU	BOD	BEŞ	LUG
1	(Belgium) Club Brugge	6	5	1	0	15	3	+12	16	Advance to round of 16	—	3–1	1–1	2–0
2	(Norway) Bodø/Glimt	6	3	1	2	11	8	+3	10	Advance to knockout round play-offs	0–1	—	3–1	5–2
3	(Turkey) Beşiktaş	6	1	1	4	7	14	−7	4 (Note: Ranked on head-to-head goal difference: Beşiktaş +1, Lugano –1.)		0–5	1–2	—	2–3
4	(Switzerland) Lugano	6	1	1	4	6	14	−8	4		1–3	0–0	0–2	—

Source: UEFA
Rules for classification: Group stage tiebreakers
Notes:
21 September 2023
21:00

Club Brugge (Belgium)	1–1	(Turkey) Beşiktaş
Vanaken 77'	Report	Tosun 88'

Jan Breydel Stadium, Bruges
Attendance: 18,442
Referee: Aleksei Kulbakov (Belarus)
21 September 2023
21:00

Lugano (Switzerland)	0–0	(Norway) Bodø/Glimt
	Report

Letzigrund, Zürich (Note: Lugano played their home matches at the Letzigrund, in Zürich, instead of their regular stadium, the Cornaredo Stadium, in Lugano, which did not meet UEFA requirements.)
Attendance: 1,384
Referee: David Šmajc (Slovenia)

5 October 2023
18:45

Bodø/Glimt (Norway)	0–1	(Belgium) Club Brugge
	Report	Vanaken 20'

Aspmyra Stadion, Bodø
Attendance: 7,481
Referee: Ondřej Berka (Czech Republic)
5 October 2023
18:45 (19:45 UTC+3)

Beşiktaş (Turkey)	2–3	(Switzerland) Lugano
Aboubakar 38', 52'	Report	Aliseda 81'; Vladi 86'; Bailly 90' (o.g.)

Beşiktaş Park, Istanbul
Attendance: 24,648
Referee: David Fuxman (Israel)

26 October 2023
18:45

Lugano (Switzerland)	1–3	(Belgium) Club Brugge
Vladi 74'	Report	Balanta 15'; Skov Olsen 50'; Vanaken 87'

Letzigrund, Zürich
Attendance: 4,037
Referee: Ovidiu Hațegan (Romania)
26 October 2023
21:00

Bodø/Glimt (Norway)	3–1	(Turkey) Beşiktaş
Grønbæk 29'; Moumbagna 58'; Saltnes 87'	Report	Moe 90+1' (o.g.)

Aspmyra Stadion, Bodø
Attendance: 7,115
Referee: Nenad Minaković (Serbia)

9 November 2023
18:45 (20:45 UTC+3)

Beşiktaş (Turkey)	1–2	(Norway) Bodø/Glimt
Bingöl 64'	Report	Moumbagna 38', 49'

Beşiktaş Park, Istanbul
Attendance: 17,314
Referee: Sander van der Eijk (Netherlands)
9 November 2023
21:00

Club Brugge (Belgium)	2–0	(Switzerland) Lugano
Thiago 62' (pen.); Vanaken 90+6'	Report

Jan Breydel Stadium, Bruges
Attendance: 16,493
Referee: Tamás Bognár (Hungary)

30 November 2023
18:45

Bodø/Glimt (Norway)	5–2	(Switzerland) Lugano
Pellegrino 40', 78'; Brunstad Fet 52'; Berg 65'; Kapskarmo 88'	Report	Celar 69'; Babic 86'

Aspmyra Stadion, Bodø
Attendance: 6,295
Referee: Dario Bel (Croatia)
30 November 2023
18:45 (20:45 UTC+3)

Beşiktaş (Turkey)	0–5	(Belgium) Club Brugge
	Report	Nielsen 4'; Thiago 14', 46'; Onyedika 50'; Skov Olsen 70'

Beşiktaş Park, Istanbul
Attendance: 13,021
Referee: David Šmajc (Slovenia)

14 December 2023
21:00

Club Brugge (Belgium)	3–1	(Norway) Bodø/Glimt
Nusa 26'; Thiago 58'; Mechele 89'	Report	Pellegrino 57' (pen.)

Jan Breydel Stadium, Bruges
Attendance: 15,835
Referee: Anastasios Papapetrou (Greece)
14 December 2023
21:00

Lugano (Switzerland)	0–2	(Turkey) Beşiktaş
	Report	Tosun 36'; Terzi 88'

Letzigrund, Zürich
Attendance: 5,476
Referee: Paweł Raczkowski (Poland)

=== Group E ===
Pos	Team	Pld	W	D	L	GF	GA	GD	Pts	Qualification	AVL	LEG	AZ	ZRI
1	(England) Aston Villa	6	4	1	1	12	7	+5	13	Advance to round of 16	—	2–1	2–1	1–0
2	(Poland) Legia Warsaw	6	4	0	2	10	6	+4	12	Advance to knockout round play-offs	3–2	—	2–0	2–0
3	(Netherlands) AZ	6	2	0	4	7	12	−5	6		1–4	1–0	—	1–0
4	(Bosnia and Herzegovina) Zrinjski Mostar	6	1	1	4	6	10	−4	4		1–1	1–2	4–3	—

Source: UEFA
Rules for classification: Group stage tiebreakers
21 September 2023
18:45

Legia Warsaw (Poland)	3–2	(England) Aston Villa
Wszołek 3'; Muçi 26', 51'	Report	Durán 6'; Digne 38'

Stadion Wojska Polskiego, Warsaw
Attendance: 27,801
Referee: Evangelos Manouchos (Greece)
21 September 2023
18:45

Zrinjski Mostar (Bosnia and Herzegovina)	4–3	(Netherlands) AZ
Kožulj 48', 81'; Ćorluka 68'; Hrvanović 71'	Report	Van Brederode 10'; Mijnans 32'; D. de Wit 44'

Stadion pod Bijelim Brijegom, Mostar
Attendance: 5,100
Referee: Don Robertson (Scotland)

5 October 2023
21:00

AZ (Netherlands)	1–0	(Poland) Legia Warsaw
Pavlidis 52'	Report

AFAS Stadion, Alkmaar
Attendance: 14,239
Referee: Nenad Minaković (Serbia)
5 October 2023
21:00 (20:00 UTC+1)

Aston Villa (England)	1–0	(Bosnia and Herzegovina) Zrinjski Mostar
McGinn 90+4'	Report

Villa Park, Birmingham
Attendance: 37,327
Referee: Urs Schnyder (Switzerland)

26 October 2023
18:45

AZ (Netherlands)	1–4	(England) Aston Villa
Sadiq 65'	Report	Bailey 13'; Tielemans 23'; Watkins 51'; McGinn 56'

AFAS Stadion, Alkmaar
Attendance: 16,633
Referee: Sven Jablonski (Germany)
26 October 2023
21:00

Zrinjski Mostar (Bosnia and Herzegovina)	1–2	(Poland) Legia Warsaw
Bilbija 30'	Report	Jakovljević 32' (o.g.); Kramer 62'

Stadion pod Bijelim Brijegom, Mostar
Attendance: 6,300
Referee: Andrei Chivulete (Romania)

9 November 2023
18:45

Legia Warsaw (Poland)	2–0	(Bosnia and Herzegovina) Zrinjski Mostar
Augustyniak 14'; Josué 30' (pen.)	Report

Stadion Wojska Polskiego, Warsaw
Attendance: 24,616
Referee: Ricardo de Burgos Bengoetxea (Spain)
9 November 2023
21:00 (20:00 UTC+0)

Aston Villa (England)	2–1	(Netherlands) AZ
Diego Carlos 61'; Watkins 81'	Report	Pavlidis 52'

Villa Park, Birmingham
Attendance: 35,156
Referee: Luis Godinho (Portugal)

30 November 2023
18:45

AZ (Netherlands)	1–0	(Bosnia and Herzegovina) Zrinjski Mostar
Pavlidis 59' (pen.)	Report

AFAS Stadion, Alkmaar
Attendance: 17,132
Referee: Oleksiy Derevinskyi (Ukraine)
30 November 2023
21:00 (20:00 UTC+0)

Aston Villa (England)	2–1	(Poland) Legia Warsaw
Diaby 4'; Moreno 58'	Report	Muçi 20'

Villa Park, Birmingham
Attendance: 37,866
Referee: Marco Di Bello (Italy)

14 December 2023
18:45

Legia Warsaw (Poland)	2–0	(Netherlands) AZ
Ribeiro 34'; Kramer 81'	Report

Stadion Wojska Polskiego, Warsaw
Attendance: 27,369
Referee: Harald Lechner (Austria)
14 December 2023
18:45

Zrinjski Mostar (Bosnia and Herzegovina)	1–1	(England) Aston Villa
Malekinušić 87'	Report	Zaniolo 61'

Stadion pod Bijelim Brijegom, Mostar
Attendance: 6,610
Referee: Balázs Berke (Hungary)

=== Group F ===
Pos	Team	Pld	W	D	L	GF	GA	GD	Pts	Qualification	FIO	FER	GNK	ČUK
1	(Italy) Fiorentina	6	3	3	0	14	6	+8	12	Advance to round of 16	—	2–2	2–1	6–0
2	(Hungary) Ferencváros	6	2	4	0	9	6	+3	10	Advance to knockout round play-offs	1–1	—	1–1	3–1
3	(Belgium) Genk	6	2	3	1	8	5	+3	9		2–2	0–0	—	2–0
4	(Serbia) Čukarički	6	0	0	6	2	16	−14	0		0–1	1–2	0–2	—

Source: UEFA
Rules for classification: Group stage tiebreakers
21 September 2023
18:45

Genk (Belgium)	2–2	(Italy) Fiorentina
Zeqiri 12'; McKenzie 85'	Report	Ranieri 7', 23'

Cegeka Arena, Genk
Attendance: 11,243
Referee: Stéphanie Frappart (France)
21 September 2023
18:45

Ferencváros (Hungary)	3–1	(Serbia) Čukarički
B. Varga 44' (pen.); Owusu 45+7'; Pešić 79'	Report	Ivanović 26'

Ferencváros Stadion, Budapest
Attendance: 17,859
Referee: Guillermo Cuadra Fernández (Spain)

5 October 2023
21:00

Fiorentina (Italy)	2–2	(Hungary) Ferencváros
Barák 66'; Ikoné 90+3'	Report	B. Varga 25'; Cissé 50'

Stadio Artemio Franchi, Florence
Attendance: 20,367
Referee: Daniel Schlager (Germany)
5 October 2023
21:00

Čukarički (Serbia)	0–2	(Belgium) Genk
	Report	Heynen 10'; Paintsil 21' (pen.)

Dubočica Stadium, Leskovac (Note: Čukarički played their home matches at the Dubočica Stadium, in Leskovac, instead of their regular stadium, Čukarički Stadium, in Belgrade, which did not meet UEFA requirements.)
Attendance: 2,447
Referee: Adam Ladebäck (Sweden)

26 October 2023
21:00

Genk (Belgium)	0–0	(Hungary) Ferencváros
	Report

Cegeka Arena, Genk
Attendance: 10,597
Referee: Aleksandar Stavrev (North Macedonia)
26 October 2023
21:00

Fiorentina (Italy)	6–0	(Serbia) Čukarički
Beltrán 6', 10'; Ikoné 29'; Sottil 65'; Martínez Quarta 73'; Lopez 83'	Report

Stadio Artemio Franchi, Florence
Attendance: 15,357
Referee: Chrysovalantis Theouli (Cyprus)

9 November 2023
18:45

Ferencváros (Hungary)	1–1	(Belgium) Genk
Pešić 48'	Report	Muñoz 62'

Ferencváros Stadion, Budapest
Attendance: 20,127
Referee: Aleksei Kulbakov (Belarus)
9 November 2023
18:45

Čukarički (Serbia)	0–1	(Italy) Fiorentina
	Report	Nzola 8' (pen.)

Dubočica Stadium, Leskovac
Attendance: 3,402
Referee: Robert Schröder (Germany)

30 November 2023
21:00

Fiorentina (Italy)	2–1	(Belgium) Genk
Martínez Quarta 45+4'; González 82' (pen.)	Report	Kayembe 45'

Stadio Artemio Franchi, Florence
Attendance: 16,666
Referee: Joey Kooij (Netherlands)
30 November 2023
21:00

Čukarički (Serbia)	1–2	(Hungary) Ferencváros
Adžić 11'	Report	Zachariassen 83'; Pešić 90+8'

Dubočica Stadium, Leskovac
Attendance: 1,389
Referee: Mohammad Al-Emara (Finland)

14 December 2023
18:45

Genk (Belgium)	2–0	(Serbia) Čukarički
Heynen 21'; Paintsil 57'	Report

Cegeka Arena, Genk
Attendance: 10,423
Referee: Trustin Farrugia Cann (Malta)
14 December 2023
18:45

Ferencváros (Hungary)	1–1	(Italy) Fiorentina
Zachariassen 48'	Report	Ranieri 73'

Ferencváros Stadion, Budapest
Attendance: 20,657
Referee: Luis Godinho (Portugal)

=== Group G ===
Pos	Team	Pld	W	D	L	GF	GA	GD	Pts	Qualification	PAOK	FRA	ABE	HJK
1	(Greece) PAOK	6	5	1	0	16	10	+6	16	Advance to round of 16	—	2–1	2–2	4–2
2	(Germany) Eintracht Frankfurt	6	3	0	3	11	7	+4	9	Advance to knockout round play-offs	1–2	—	2–1	6–0
3	(Scotland) Aberdeen	6	1	3	2	10	10	0	6		2–3	2–0	—	1–1
4	(Finland) HJK	6	0	2	4	7	17	−10	2		2–3	0–1	2–2	—

Source: UEFA
Rules for classification: Group stage tiebreakers
21 September 2023
18:45

Eintracht Frankfurt (Germany)	2–1	(Scotland) Aberdeen
Marmoush 11' (pen.); Koch 61'	Report	Polvara 22'

Waldstadion, Frankfurt
Attendance: 55,500
Referee: Chrysovalantis Theouli (Cyprus)
21 September 2023
18:45 (19:45 UTC+3)

HJK (Finland)	2–3	(Greece) PAOK
Bandé 35'; Radulović 90+9' (pen.)	Report	Koulierakis 55'; Despodov 81'; Brandon 90+4'

Bolt Arena, Helsinki
Attendance: 8,532
Referee: Marian Barbu (Romania)

5 October 2023
21:00 (22:00 UTC+3)

PAOK (Greece)	2–1	(Germany) Eintracht Frankfurt
A. Živković 28'; Koulierakis 90+2'	Report	Marmoush 68'

Toumba Stadium, Thessaloniki
Attendance: 21,549
Referee: Simone Sozza (Italy)
5 October 2023
21:00 (20:00 UTC+1)

Aberdeen (Scotland)	1–1	(Finland) HJK
Miovski 79'	Report	Radulović 59'

Pittodrie Stadium, Aberdeen
Attendance: 16,316
Referee: Daniel Stefański (Poland)

26 October 2023
21:00

Eintracht Frankfurt (Germany)	6–0	(Finland) HJK
Dina Ebimbe 12' (pen.), 89'; Koch 27'; Marmoush 31'; Tuta 45+3'; Skhiri 55'	Report

Waldstadion, Frankfurt
Attendance: 55,500
Referee: Viktor Kopiyevskyi (Ukraine)
26 October 2023
21:00 (20:00 UTC+1)

Aberdeen (Scotland)	2–3	(Greece) PAOK
Miovski 50'; Polvara 58'	Report	Despodov 73'; Vieirinha 84'; Schwab 90+6' (pen.)

Pittodrie Stadium, Aberdeen
Attendance: 16,089
Referee: Sebastian Gishamer (Austria)

9 November 2023
18:45 (19:45 UTC+2)

PAOK (Greece)	2–2	(Scotland) Aberdeen
Taison 23'; Samatta 67'	Report	Duk 14'; McGrath 70'

Toumba Stadium, Thessaloniki
Attendance: 19,019
Referee: Juxhin Xhaja (Albania)
9 November 2023
18:45 (19:45 UTC+2)

HJK (Finland)	0–1	(Germany) Eintracht Frankfurt
	Report	Chaïbi 31'

Bolt Arena, Helsinki
Attendance: 10,121
Referee: Pierre Gaillouste (France)

30 November 2023
18:45 (19:45 UTC+2)

HJK (Finland)	2–2	(Scotland) Aberdeen
Bandé 16'; Hostikka 33'	Report	MacDonald 41'; Duk 56'

Bolt Arena, Helsinki
Attendance: 9,053
Referee: Genc Nuza (Kosovo)
30 November 2023
21:00

Eintracht Frankfurt (Germany)	1–2	(Greece) PAOK
Marmoush 58'	Report	Kędziora 55'; Živković 73'

Waldstadion, Frankfurt
Attendance: 58,000
Referee: Damian Sylwestrzak (Poland)

14 December 2023
18:45 (19:45 UTC+2)

PAOK (Greece)	4–2	(Finland) HJK
Ozdoyev 37'; Konstantelias 47'; Toivio 53' (o.g.); Murg 85'	Report	Radulović 6'; Hetemaj 90+2' (pen.)

Toumba Stadium, Thessaloniki
Attendance: 13,696
Referee: Giorgi Kruashvili (Georgia)
14 December 2023
18:45 (17:45 UTC+0)

Aberdeen (Scotland)	2–0	(Germany) Eintracht Frankfurt
Duk 41'; Sokler 74'	Report

Pittodrie Stadium, Aberdeen
Attendance: 14,474
Referee: Miguel Nogueira (Portugal)

=== Group H ===
Pos	Team	Pld	W	D	L	GF	GA	GD	Pts	Qualification	FEN	LUD	NOR	TRN
1	(Turkey) Fenerbahçe	6	4	0	2	13	11	+2	12 (Note: Tied on head-to-head results. Overall goal difference used as a tiebreaker.)	Advance to round of 16	—	3–1	3–1	4–0
2	(Bulgaria) Ludogorets Razgrad	6	4	0	2	11	11	0	12	Advance to knockout round play-offs	2–0	—	1–0	4–0
3	(Denmark) Nordsjælland	6	3	1	2	17	7	+10	10		6–1	7–1	—	1–1
4	(Slovakia) Spartak Trnava	6	0	1	5	3	15	−12	1		1–2	1–2	0–2	—

Source: UEFA
Rules for classification: Group stage tiebreakers
Notes:
21 September 2023
18:45 (19:45 UTC+3)

Ludogorets Razgrad (Bulgaria)	4–0	(Slovakia) Spartak Trnava
Yordanov 46'; Piotrowski 50', 63'; Rwan 90+4'	Report

Huvepharma Arena, Razgrad
Attendance: 6,358
Referee: Genc Nuza (Kosovo)
21 September 2023
18:45 (19:45 UTC+3)

Fenerbahçe (Turkey)	3–1	(Denmark) Nordsjælland
Crespo 24'; Batshuayi 30'; Aziz 47'	Report	Villadsen 55'

Şükrü Saracoğlu Stadium, Istanbul
Attendance: 36,130
Referee: Gergő Bogár (Hungary)

5 October 2023
21:00

Nordsjælland (Denmark)	7–1	(Bulgaria) Ludogorets Razgrad
Ingvartsen 2' (pen.); Osman 11'; Tverskov 31'; Nygren 32', 74'; Son 68' (o.g.); Rasmussen 86'	Report	Verdon 9' (pen.)

Right to Dream Park, Farum
Attendance: 4,069
Referee: Juxhin Xhaja (Albania)
5 October 2023
21:00

Spartak Trnava (Slovakia)	1–2	(Turkey) Fenerbahçe
Ofori 88'	Report	King 70', 81'

Anton Malatinský Stadium, Trnava
Attendance: 17,528
Referee: Sascha Stegemann (Germany)

26 October 2023
18:45 (19:45 UTC+3)

Fenerbahçe (Turkey)	3–1	(Bulgaria) Ludogorets Razgrad
Batshuayi 42'; Zajc 52', 90+3'	Report	Becão 65' (o.g.)

Şükrü Saracoğlu Stadium, Istanbul
Attendance: 35,595
Referee: Guillermo Cuadra Fernández (Spain)
26 October 2023
21:00

Spartak Trnava (Slovakia)	0–2	(Denmark) Nordsjælland
	Report	Jensen-Abbew 36'; Rasmussen 48'

Anton Malatinský Stadium, Trnava
Attendance: 12,539
Referee: Allard Lindhout (Netherlands)

9 November 2023
18:45

Nordsjælland (Denmark)	1–1	(Slovakia) Spartak Trnava
Ingvartsen 32' (pen.)	Report	Ďuriš 61'

Right to Dream Park, Farum
Attendance: 5,262
Referee: Mohammad Al-Emara (Finland)
9 November 2023
21:00 (22:00 UTC+2)

Ludogorets Razgrad (Bulgaria)	2–0	(Turkey) Fenerbahçe
Piotrowski 18'; Rwan 90+2'	Report

Huvepharma Arena, Razgrad
Attendance: 10,363
Referee: Ondřej Berka (Czech Republic)

30 November 2023
21:00

Nordsjælland (Denmark)	6–1	(Turkey) Fenerbahçe
Hey 21'; Svensson 25'; Nygren 55', 75', 84'; Rasmussen 66'	Report	Batshuayi 43'

Right to Dream Park, Farum
Attendance: 7,323
Referee: Jérémie Pignard (France)
30 November 2023
21:00

Spartak Trnava (Slovakia)	1–2	(Bulgaria) Ludogorets Razgrad
Daniel 78'	Report	Duah 74'; Tissera 90+5'

Anton Malatinský Stadium, Trnava
Attendance: 10,158
Referee: Vitālijs Spasjoņņikovs (Latvia)

14 December 2023
18:45 (19:45 UTC+2)

Ludogorets Razgrad (Bulgaria)	1–0	(Denmark) Nordsjælland
Piotrowski 79'	Report

Huvepharma Arena, Razgrad
Attendance: 6,464
Referee: Ovidiu Hațegan (Romania)
14 December 2023
18:45 (20:45 UTC+3)

Fenerbahçe (Turkey)	4–0	(Slovakia) Spartak Trnava
Kadıoğlu 36'; Takáč 48' (o.g.); Džeko 59', 61'	Report

Şükrü Saracoğlu Stadium, Istanbul
Attendance: 33,936
Referee: Aleksandar Stavrev (North Macedonia)
