= Maksym Smiyan =

Ukrainian footballer (born 2002)

Personal information
- Full name: Maksym Oleksandrovych Smiyan
- Date of birth: 11 April 2002 (age 24)
- Place of birth: Ukraine
- Height: 1.79 m (5 ft 10 in)
- Position: Left-back

Team information
- Current team: Veres Rivne
- Number: 2

Youth career
- 2015–2019: DYuSSh-15 Kyiv
- 2019–2021: Zorya Luhansk

Senior career*
Years	Team	Apps	(Gls)
2021–2023	Zorya Luhansk	9	(0)
2024–	Veres Rivne	49	(2)
- * Club domestic league appearances and goals as of 3 June 2026

Maksym Oleksandrovych Smiyan (Ukrainian: Максим Олександрович Сміян; born 11 April 2002) is a Ukrainian professional footballer who plays as a left-back for Ukrainian Premier League club Veres Rivne.

== Career ==
Smiyan is a product of DYuSSh-15 Kyiv and Zorya Luhansk academies. He played initially for Zorya Luhansk in the Ukrainian Premier League Reserves.

In October 2021 he was promoted to the senior squad, and was an unused substitution player in the winning Ukrainian Premier League match against Metalist 1925 Kharkiv on 31 October 2021. Smiyan made his debut for Zorya Luhansk only on 11 August 2022, playing as a first-time substitution player in a losing match against Romanian club Universitatea Craiova in the 2022–23 UEFA Europa Conference League third qualifying round.

== Career statistics ==
=== Club ===
As of match played 11 August 2022

Club	Season	League			Cup		Continental		Other		Total	
Club	Season	Division	Apps	Goals	Apps	Goals	Apps	Goals	Apps	Goals	Apps	Goals
Zorya Luhansk	2022–23	Ukrainian Premier League	0	0	0	0	1 (Note: Appearance(s) in UEFA Europa Conference League)	0	0	0	1	0
Zorya Luhansk	Total		0	0	0	0	1	0	0	0	1	0
Career total			0	0	0	0	1	0	0	0	1	0
