= Dubočica Stadium =

Football stadium in Leskovac, Serbia

- Стадион Дубочица
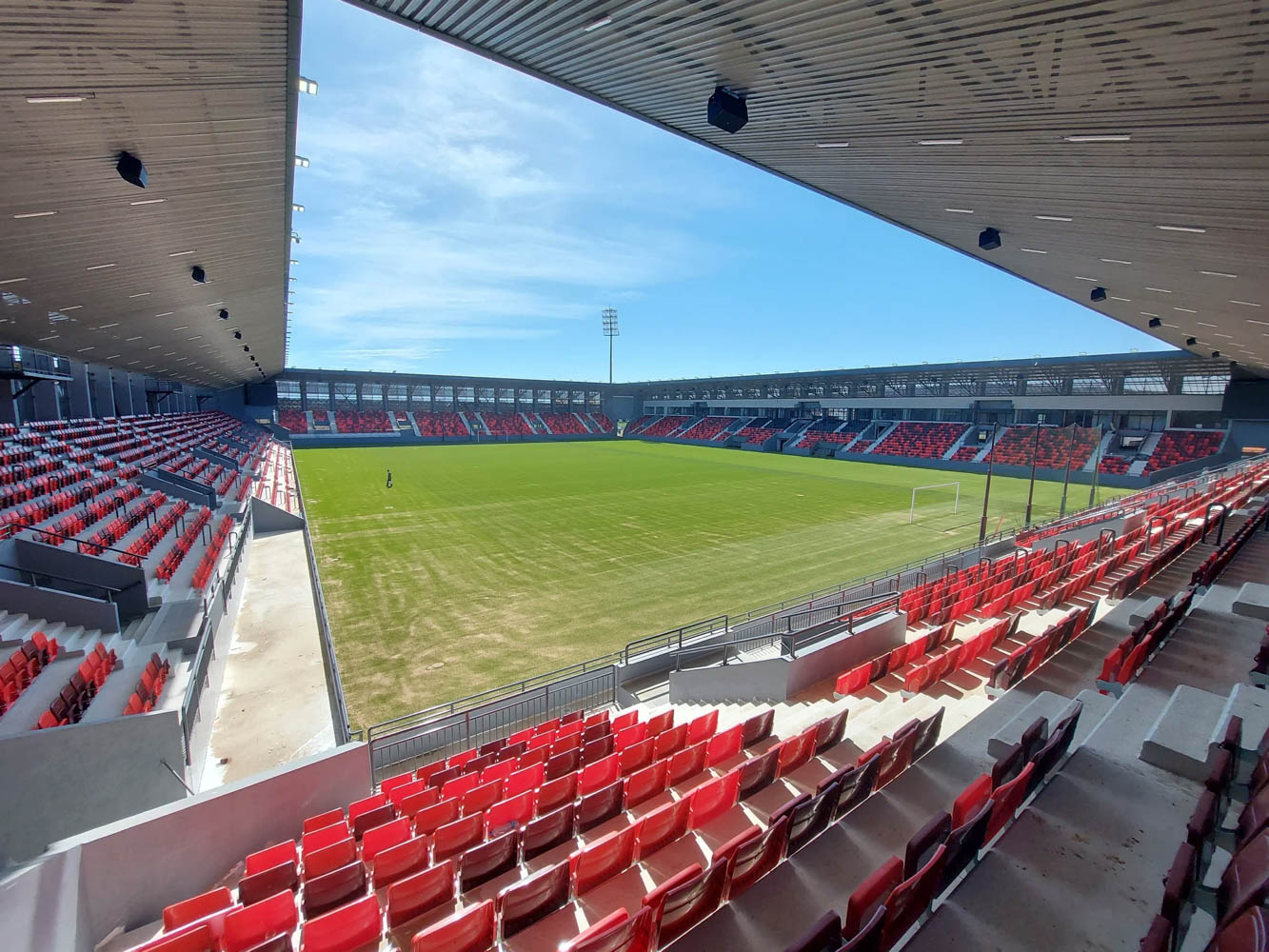
- View on Dubočica Stadium in March 2023; UEFA
- Interactive map of Dubočica Stadium
- Location: Leskovac, Serbia
- Coordinates: 42.9904°N 21.9596°E
- Owner: City of Leskovac
- Operator: FSS Stadiums D.O.O.
- Capacity: 8,136
- Surface: Hybrid grass

Construction
- Groundbreaking: 2021
- Built: 2021–2023
- Opened: 21 August 2023
- Cost: €28 million (2020)

Tenants
- Dubočica (2023–present); Čukarički (2023–24; UEFA matches); Radnički 1923 (2024–2025; UEFA matches): Major sporting events hosted; 2027 UEFA European Under-21 Championship

Dubočica Stadium (Serbian: Стадион Дубочица / Stadion Dubočica) is a football stadium in Leskovac, Serbia. It is the home ground of GFK Dubočica. The stadium consists of four stands with a total seating capacity of 8,136.

== History ==
The stadium was opened on 21 August 2023. First game ever was 2023–24 Serbian First League match between home side GFK Dubočica and Novi Sad 1921 that ended in 2–1 win for the GFK Dubočica.

During the 2023–24 season, the stadium hosted Belgrade's side Čukarički for their European games since their home stadium, Čukarički Stadium in Belgrade, did not meet UEFA requirements. They played games against Olympiacos in 2023–24 UEFA Europa League play-off round and against Fiorentina, Ferencvárosi and Genk in 2023–24 UEFA Europa Conference League group stage.

== Gallery ==
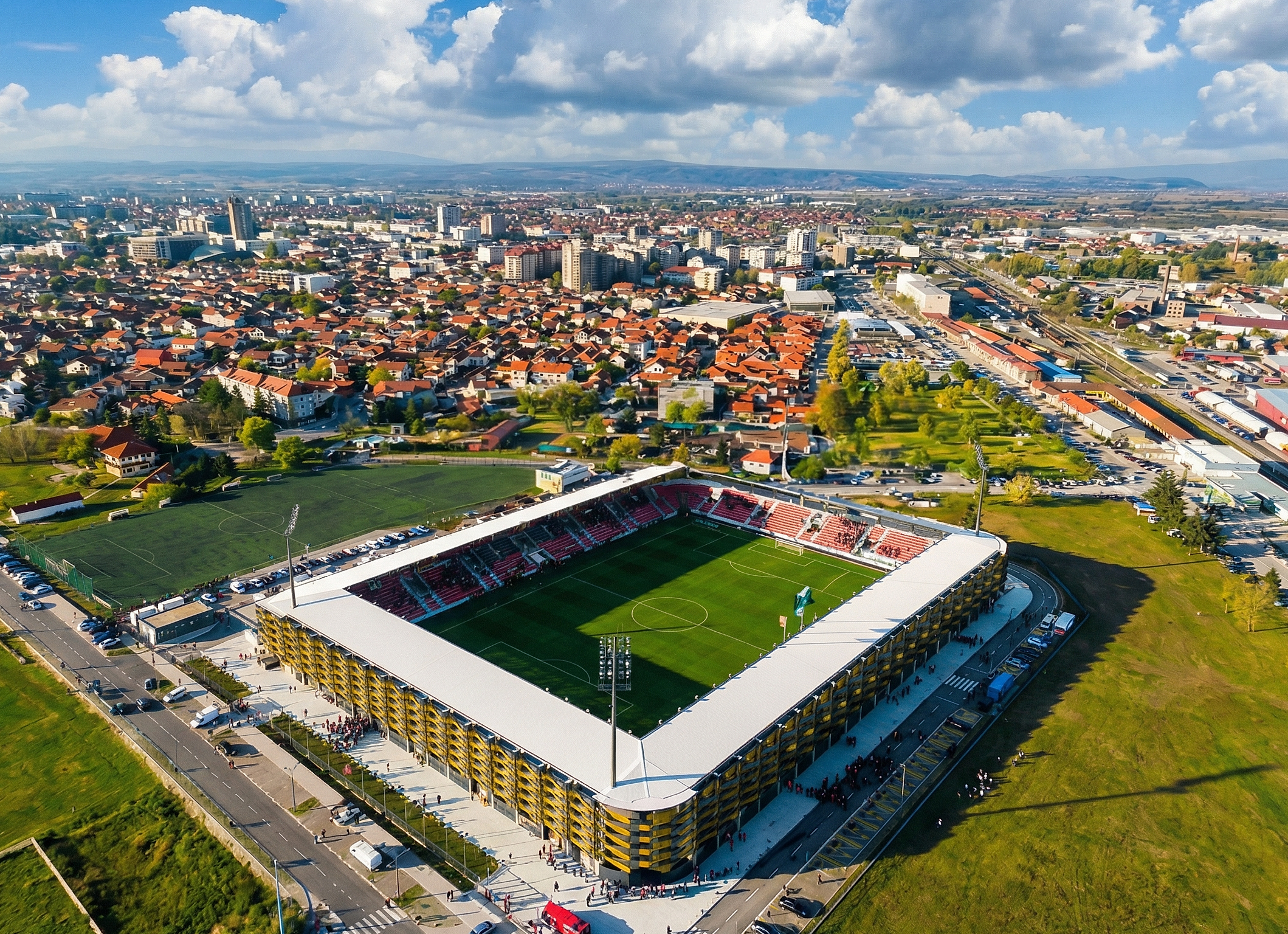
Aerial view on Dubočica Stadium in April 2026

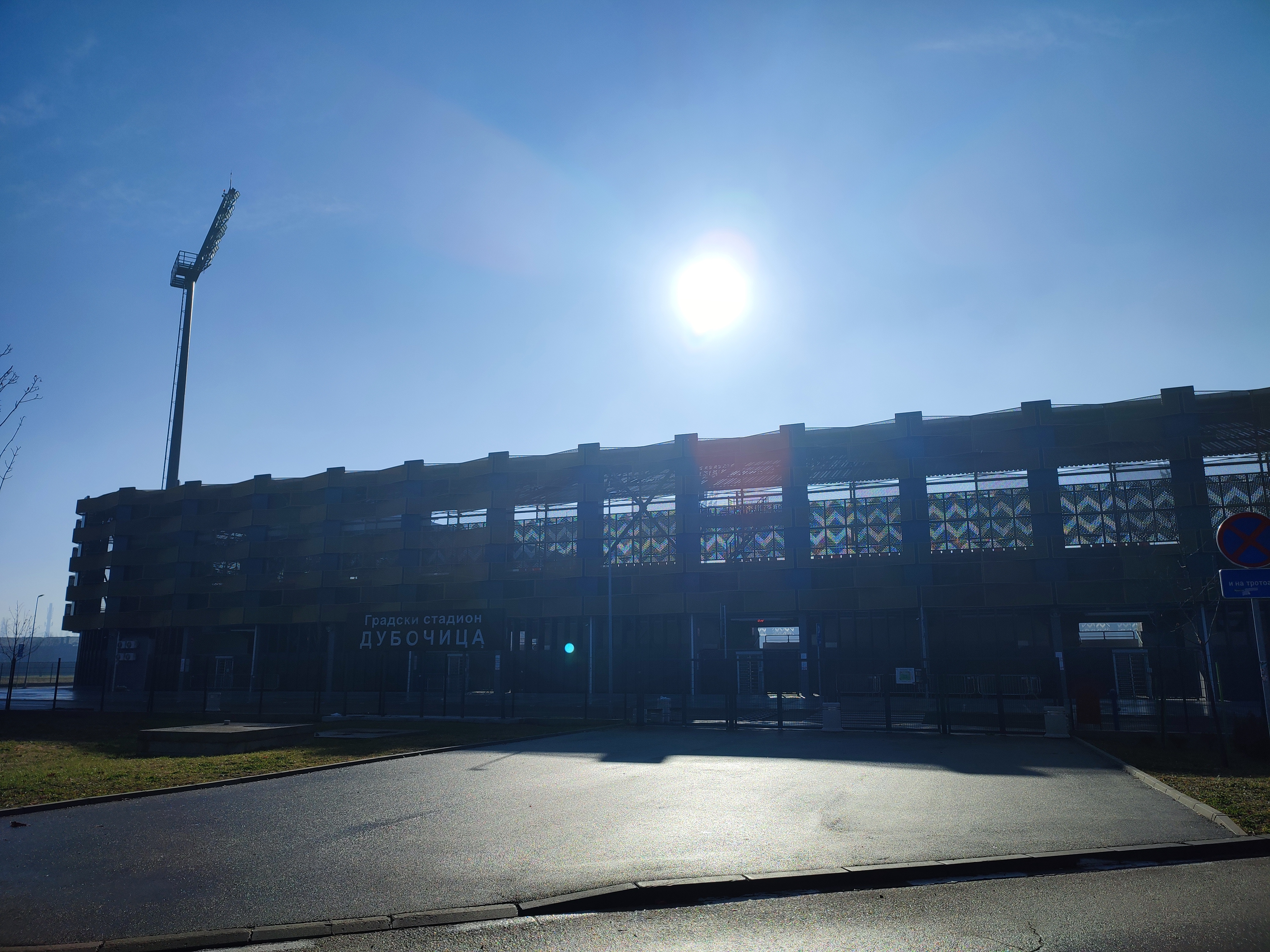
Entrance to the stadium, in December 2024

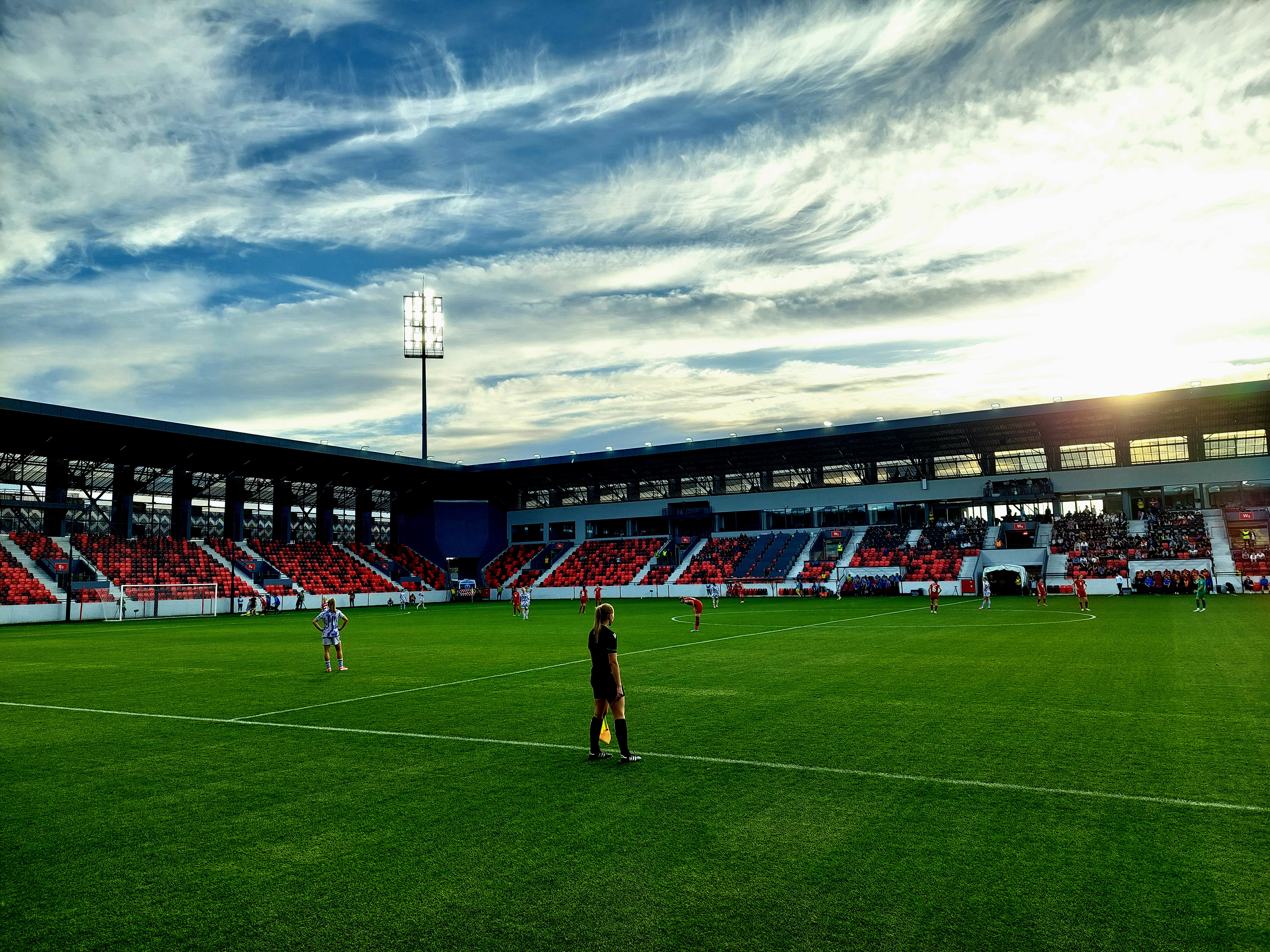
Dubočica Stadium during the game, in April 2024

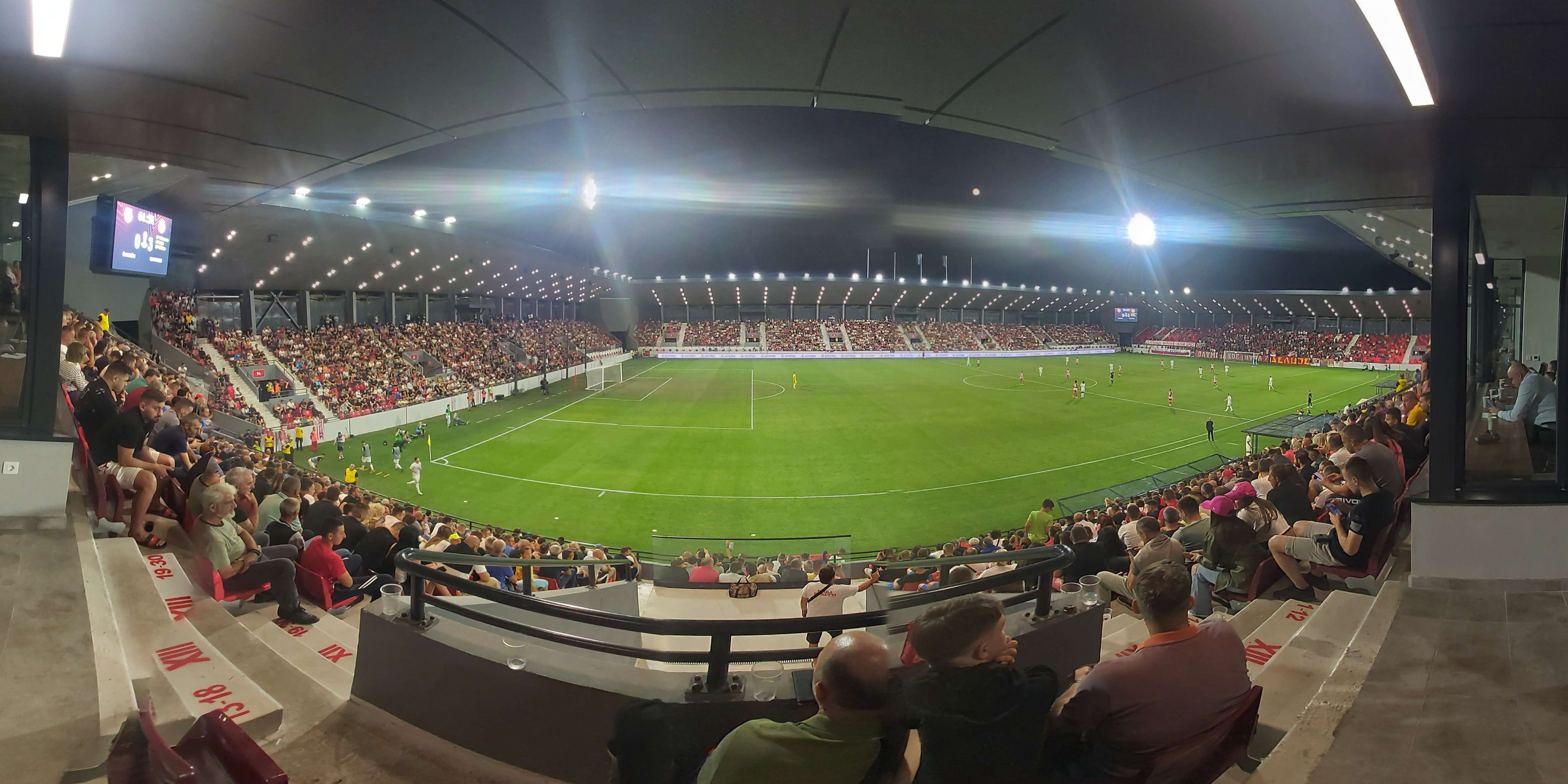
View on the stadium during the game at night, August 2023

== European matches ==
Čukarički played their 2023–24 UEFA Europa League and 2023–24 UEFA Europa Conference League matches here. Radnički 1923 played their 2024–25 UEFA Europa Conference League matche here.

#	Date	Competition	Opponent	Score	Att.	Ref
(Serbia) Čukarički (2023–24)
1.	31 August 2023	2023–24 UEFA Europa League play-off round	(Greece) Olympiacos	0–3	6,812	
2.	5 October 2023	2023–24 UEFA Europa Conference League group stage	(Belgium) Genk	0–2	2,447	
3.	9 November 2023	2023–24 UEFA Europa Conference League group stage	(Italy) Fiorentina	0–1	3,402	
4.	30 November 2023	2023–24 UEFA Europa Conference League group stage	(Hungary) Ferencváros	1–2	1,389	
(Serbia) Radnički 1923 (2024–25)
5.	25 July 2024	2024–25 UEFA Conference League qualifying phase	(Montenegro) Mornar	1–0	3,191	

== International matches ==
#	Date	Competition	Opponent	Score	Att.	Ref
Serbia (2023–)
1.	18 November 2023	UEFA Euro 2024 qualifying	Bulgaria	2–2	7,325	
2.	12 October 2024	2024–25 UEFA Nations League	Switzerland	2–0	6,383	
3.	18 November 2024	2024–25 UEFA Nations League	Denmark	0–0	7,295	
4.	10 June 2025	2026 FIFA World Cup qualification	Andorra	3–0	7,576	
5.	11 October 2025	2026 FIFA World Cup qualification	Albania	0–1	4,320	
6.	16 November 2025	2026 FIFA World Cup qualification	Latvia	2–1	3,894	

== See also ==
- List of football stadiums in Serbia
