= Ihor Horbach (footballer) =

Ukrainian footballer

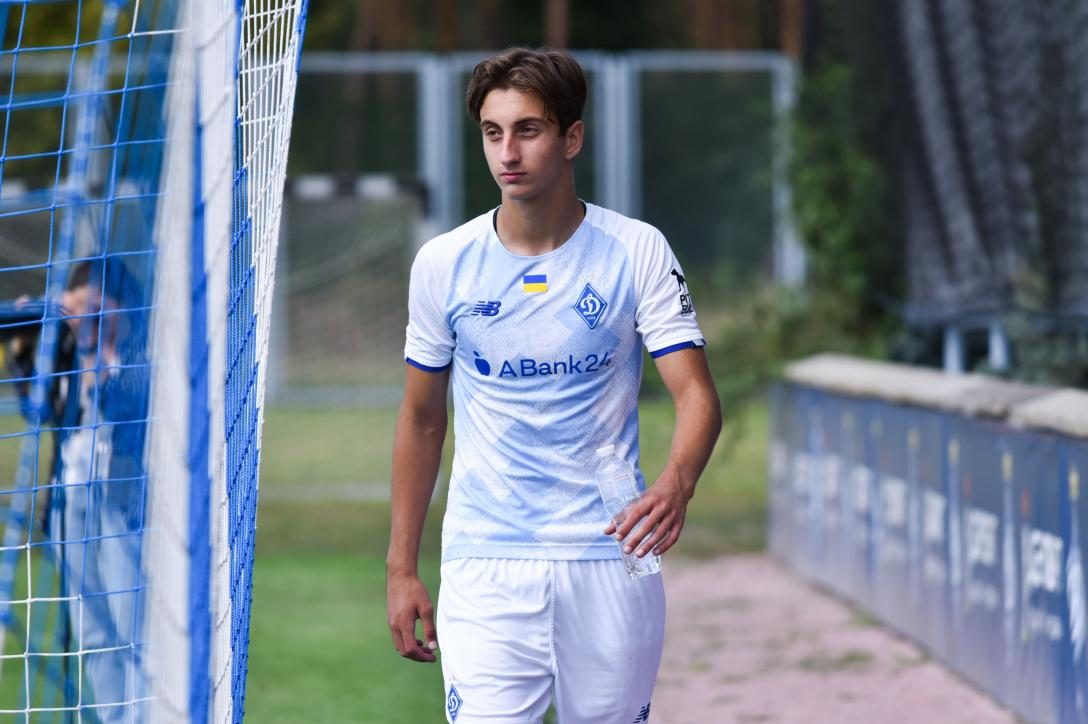

Personal information
- Full name: Ihor Volodymyrovych Horbach
- Date of birth: 27 May 2004 (age 22)
- Place of birth: Kyiv, Ukraine
- Height: 1.83 m (6 ft 0 in)
- Position: Centre-forward

Team information
- Current team: Zorya Luhansk
- Number: 11

Youth career
- 2017–2021: Dynamo Kyiv

Senior career*
Years	Team	Apps	(Gls)
2020–2025	Dynamo Kyiv	0	(0)
2023–2025	→ Zorya Luhansk (loan)	44	(3)
2025–	Zorya Luhansk	18	(0)

International career^{‡}
2019	Ukraine U17	3	(0)
2021–2023	Ukraine U19	6	(1)
2024–	Ukraine U21	6	(0)
- * Club domestic league appearances and goals as of 3 June 2026 ‡ National team caps and goals as of 27 May 2025

Ihor Volodymyrovych Horbach (Ukrainian: Ігор Володимирович Горбач; born 27 May 2004) is a Ukrainian professional footballer who plays as a centre-forward for Zorya Luhansk.
