= 2023–24 UEFA Europa Conference League knockout phase =

The 2023–24 UEFA Europa Conference League knockout phase began on 15 February with the knockout round play-offs and ended on 29 May 2024 with the final at the Agia Sophia Stadium in Athens, Greece, to decide the champions of the 2023–24 UEFA Europa Conference League. A total of 24 teams competed in the knockout phase.

Times are CET/CEST, (Note: CET (UTC+1) for dates up to 25 March 2023 (round of 16), and CEST (UTC+2) for dates thereafter (quarter-finals, semi-finals and final).) as listed by UEFA (local times, if different, are in parentheses).

== Qualified teams ==
The knockout phase involved 24 teams: the 16 teams which qualified as winners and runners-up of each of the eight groups in the group stage, and the eight third-placed teams from the Europa League group stage.

=== Europa Conference League group stage winners and runners-up ===
| Group | Winners (advance to round of 16 and seeded in draw) | Runners-up (advance to KO play-offs and seeded in draw) |
|---|---|---|
| A | (France) Lille | (Slovakia) Slovan Bratislava |
| B | (Israel) Maccabi Tel Aviv | (Belgium) Gent |
| C | (Czech Republic) Viktoria Plzeň | (Croatia) Dinamo Zagreb |
| D | (Belgium) Club Brugge | (Norway) Bodø/Glimt |
| E | (England) Aston Villa | (Poland) Legia Warsaw |
| F | (Italy) Fiorentina | (Hungary) Ferencváros |
| G | (Greece) PAOK | (Germany) Eintracht Frankfurt |
| H | (Turkey) Fenerbahçe | (Bulgaria) Ludogorets Razgrad |

=== Europa League group stage third-placed teams ===
| Group | Third-placed teams (advance to KO play-offs and unseeded in draw) |
|---|---|
| A | (Greece) Olympiacos |
| B | (Netherlands) Ajax |
| C | (Spain) Real Betis |
| D | (Austria) Sturm Graz |
| E | (Belgium) Union Saint-Gilloise |
| F | (Israel) Maccabi Haifa |
| G | (Switzerland) Servette |
| H | (Norway) Molde |

== Format ==
Each tie in the knockout phase, apart from the final, was played over two legs, with each team playing one leg at home. The team that scored more goals on aggregate over the two legs advanced to the next round. If the aggregate score was level, then 30 minutes of extra time were played (the away goals rule was not applied). If the score was still level at the end of extra time, the winners were decided by a penalty shoot-out. In the final, which was played as a single match, if the score was level at the end of normal time, extra time was played, followed by a penalty shoot-out if the score was still level. The mechanism of the draws for each round was as follows:

- In the draw for the knockout round play-offs, the eight group runners-up were seeded, and the eight Europa League group third-placed teams were unseeded. The seeded teams were drawn against the unseeded teams, with the seeded teams hosting the second leg. Teams from the same association could not be drawn against each other.
- In the draw for the round of 16, the eight group winners were seeded, and the eight winners of the knockout round play-offs were unseeded. Again, the seeded teams were drawn against the unseeded teams, with the seeded teams hosting the second leg. Teams from the same association could not be drawn against each other.
- In the draws for the quarter-finals onwards, there were no seedings, and teams from the same association could be drawn against each other. As the draws for the quarter-finals and semi-finals were held together before the quarter-finals were played, the identity of the quarter-final winners was not known at the time of the semi-final draw. A draw was also held to determine which semi-final winner would be designated as the "home" team for the final (for administrative purposes as it was played at a neutral venue).

== Schedule ==
The schedule was as follows (all draws were held at the UEFA headquarters in Nyon, Switzerland).

| Round | Draw date | First leg | Second leg |
|---|---|---|---|
| Knockout round play-offs | 18 December 2023, 14:00 | 15 February 2024 | 22 February 2024 |
| Round of 16 | 23 February 2024, 13:00 | 7 March 2024 | 14 March 2024 |
| Quarter-finals | 15 March 2024, 14:00 | 11 April 2024 | 18 April 2024 |
| Semi-finals | 15 March 2024, 14:00 | 2 May 2024 | 9 May 2024 |
| Final | 15 March 2024, 14:00 | 29 May 2024 at Agia Sophia Stadium, Athens | |

== Bracket ==
Knockout round play-offs
(Netherlands) Ajax (a.e.t.) | 2 | 2 | 4
(Norway) Bodø/Glimt | 2 | 1 | 3
(Austria) Sturm Graz | 4 | 1 | 5
(Slovakia) Slovan Bratislava | 1 | 0 | 1
(Greece) Olympiacos | 1 | 1 | 2
(Hungary) Ferencváros | 0 | 0 | 0
(Belgium) Union Saint-Gilloise | 2 | 2 | 4
(Germany) Eintracht Frankfurt | 2 | 1 | 3
(Switzerland) Servette | 0 | 1 | 1
(Bulgaria) Ludogorets Razgrad | 0 | 0 | 0
(Israel) Maccabi Haifa | 1 | 1 | 2
(Belgium) Gent | 0 | 1 | 1
(Norway) Molde | 3 | 3 | 6
(Poland) Legia Warsaw | 2 | 0 | 2
(Spain) Real Betis | 0 | 1 | 1
(Croatia) Dinamo Zagreb | 1 | 1 | 2

Round of 16
(Netherlands) Ajax | 0 | 0 | 0
(England) Aston Villa | 0 | 4 | 4
(Austria) Sturm Graz | 0 | 1 | 1
(France) Lille | 3 | 1 | 4
(Greece) Olympiacos (a.e.t.) | 1 | 6 | 7
(Israel) Maccabi Tel Aviv | 4 | 1 | 5
(Belgium) Union Saint-Gilloise | 0 | 1 | 1
(Turkey) Fenerbahçe | 3 | 0 | 3
(Switzerland) Servette | 0 | 0 | 0 (1)
(Czech Republic) Viktoria Plzeň (p) | 0 | 0 | 0 (3)
(Israel) Maccabi Haifa | 3 | 1 | 4
(Italy) Fiorentina | 4 | 1 | 5
(Norway) Molde | 2 | 0 | 2
(Belgium) Club Brugge | 1 | 3 | 4
(Croatia) Dinamo Zagreb | 2 | 1 | 3
(Greece) PAOK | 0 | 5 | 5

Quarter-finals
(England) Aston Villa (p) | 2 | 1 | 3 (4)
(France) Lille | 1 | 2 | 3 (3)
(Greece) Olympiacos (p) | 3 | 0 | 3 (3)
(Turkey) Fenerbahçe | 2 | 1 | 3 (2)
(Czech Republic) Viktoria Plzeň | 0 | 0 | 0
(Italy) Fiorentina (a.e.t.) | 0 | 2 | 2
(Belgium) Club Brugge | 1 | 2 | 3
(Greece) PAOK | 0 | 0 | 0

Semi-finals
(England) Aston Villa | 2 | 0 | 2
(Greece) Olympiacos | 4 | 2 | 6
(Italy) Fiorentina | 3 | 1 | 4
(Belgium) Club Brugge | 2 | 1 | 3

Final
29 May – Athens
(Greece) Olympiacos (a.e.t.) | 1
(Italy) Fiorentina | 0

== Knockout round play-offs ==
The draw for the knockout round play-offs was held on 18 December 2023, 14:00 CET.

=== Summary ===
The first legs were played on 15 February, and the second legs were played on 21 and 22 February 2024.

| Team 1 | Agg. | Team 2 | 1st leg | 2nd leg |
|---|---|---|---|---|
| Sturm Graz (Austria) | 5–1 | (Slovakia) Slovan Bratislava | 4–1 | 1–0 |
| Servette (Switzerland) | 1–0 | (Bulgaria) Ludogorets Razgrad | 0–0 | 1–0 |
| Union Saint-Gilloise (Belgium) | 4–3 | (Germany) Eintracht Frankfurt | 2–2 | 2–1 |
| Real Betis (Spain) | 1–2 | (Croatia) Dinamo Zagreb | 0–1 | 1–1 |
| Olympiacos (Greece) | 2–0 | (Hungary) Ferencváros | 1–0 | 1–0 |
| Ajax (Netherlands) | 4–3 | (Norway) Bodø/Glimt | 2–2 | 2–1 (a.e.t.) |
| Molde (Norway) | 6–2 | (Poland) Legia Warsaw | 3–2 | 3–0 |
| Maccabi Haifa (Israel) | 2–1 | (Belgium) Gent | 1–0 | 1–1 |

=== Matches ===
15 February 2024
18:45

| Sturm Graz (Austria) | 4–1 | (Slovakia) Slovan Bratislava |
|---|---|---|
| Biereth 4'; Stanković 27'; Kiteishvili 64' (pen.); Camara 90+1' | Report | Rodrigues 8' |

Liebenauer Stadium, Graz
Attendance: 12,817
Referee: Mohammed Al-Hakim (Sweden)
22 February 2024
21:00

| Slovan Bratislava (Slovakia) | 0–1 | (Austria) Sturm Graz |
|---|---|---|
| | Report | Biereth 52' |

Tehelné pole, Bratislava
Attendance: 19,870
Referee: Orel Grinfeld (Israel)

Sturm Graz won 5–1 on aggregate.

15 February 2024
21:00

| Servette (Switzerland) | 0–0 | (Bulgaria) Ludogorets Razgrad |
|---|---|---|
| | Report |

Stade de Genève, Geneva
Attendance: 13,847
Referee: Filip Glova (Slovakia)
22 February 2024
18:45 (19:45 UTC+2)

| Ludogorets Razgrad (Bulgaria) | 0–1 | (Switzerland) Servette |
|---|---|---|
| | Report | Cognat 6' |

Huvepharma Arena, Razgrad
Attendance: 6,487
Referee: Aliyar Aghayev (Azerbaijan)

Servette won 1–0 on aggregate.

15 February 2024
18:45

| Union Saint-Gilloise (Belgium) | 2–2 | (Germany) Eintracht Frankfurt |
|---|---|---|
| Rasmussen 31'; Nilsson 68' | Report | Chaïbi 3'; Kalajdžić 10' |

Constant Vanden Stock Stadium, Brussels (Note: Union Saint-Gilloise played their home matches at the Constant Vanden Stock Stadium, in Brussels, instead of their regular stadium, Joseph Marien Stadium, in Brussels, which did not meet UEFA requirements.)
Attendance: 9,015
Referee: Craig Pawson (England)
22 February 2024
21:00

| Eintracht Frankfurt (Germany) | 1–2 | (Belgium) Union Saint-Gilloise |
|---|---|---|
| Dina Ebimbe 87' | Report | Puertas 47'; Eckert 80' |

Waldstadion, Frankfurt
Attendance: 57,300
Referee: Espen Eskås (Norway)

Union Saint-Gilloise won 4–3 on aggregate.

15 February 2024
21:00

| Real Betis (Spain) | 0–1 | (Croatia) Dinamo Zagreb |
|---|---|---|
| | Report | Petković 75' (pen.) |

Benito Villamarín, Seville
Attendance: 25,091
Referee: Mykola Balakin (Ukraine)
22 February 2024
18:45

| Dinamo Zagreb (Croatia) | 1–1 | (Spain) Real Betis |
|---|---|---|
| Kaneko 59' | Report | Bakambu 38' |

Stadion Maksimir, Zagreb
Attendance: 18,002
Referee: Urs Schnyder (Switzerland)

Dinamo Zagreb won 2–1 on aggregate.

15 February 2024
18:45 (19:45 UTC+2)

| Olympiacos (Greece) | 1–0 | (Hungary) Ferencváros |
|---|---|---|
| El Kaabi 83' | Report |

Karaiskakis Stadium, Piraeus
Attendance: 30,300
Referee: Glenn Nyberg (Sweden)
22 February 2024
21:00

| Ferencváros (Hungary) | 0–1 | (Greece) Olympiacos |
|---|---|---|
| | Report | El Kaabi 45' (pen.) |

Ferencváros Stadion, Budapest
Attendance: 21,057
Referee: Clément Turpin (France)

Olympiacos won 2–0 on aggregate.

15 February 2024
21:00

| Ajax (Netherlands) | 2–2 | (Norway) Bodø/Glimt |
|---|---|---|
| Van den Boomen 90+1' (pen.); Berghuis 90+7' | Report | Grønbæk 16', 64' |

Johan Cruyff Arena, Amsterdam
Attendance: 52,267
Referee: António Nobre (Portugal)
22 February 2024
18:45

| Bodø/Glimt (Norway) | 1–2 (a.e.t.) | (Netherlands) Ajax |
|---|---|---|
| Berg 83' | Report | Berghuis 34'; Taylor 114' |

Aspmyra Stadion, Bodø
Attendance: 7,885
Referee: Anastasios Sidiropoulos (Greece)

Ajax won 4–3 on aggregate.

15 February 2024
18:45

| Molde (Norway) | 3–2 | (Poland) Legia Warsaw |
|---|---|---|
| Gulbrandsen 12', 19'; Kaasa 24' | Report | Josué 64'; Augustyniak 71' |

Aker Stadion, Molde
Attendance: 3,996
Referee: Enea Jorgji (Albania)
22 February 2024
21:00

| Legia Warsaw (Poland) | 0–3 | (Norway) Molde |
|---|---|---|
| | Report | Gulbrandsen 2', 67'; Hestad 20' |

Stadion Wojska Polskiego, Warsaw
Attendance: 27,459
Referee: Harm Osmers (Germany)

Molde won 6–2 on aggregate.

15 February 2024
21:00

| Maccabi Haifa (Israel) | 1–0 | (Belgium) Gent |
|---|---|---|
| Pierrot 65' | Report |

Bozsik Aréna, Budapest, Hungary (Note: Due to the Gaza war, Maccabi Haifa played their home matches at a neutral venue.)
Attendance: 1,274
Referee: Willie Collum (Scotland)
21 February 2024
18:00

| Gent (Belgium) | 1–1 | (Israel) Maccabi Haifa |
|---|---|---|
| Seck 69' (o.g.) | Report | Pierrot 4' |

Ghelamco Arena, Ghent
Attendance: 60 (Note: Due to anticipated crowd trouble in protest against the Gaza war, no spectators were allowed to the Gent v Maccabi Haifa match.)
Referee: Matej Jug (Slovenia)

Maccabi Haifa won 2–1 on aggregate.

== Round of 16 ==
The draw for the round of 16 was held on 23 February 2024, 13:00 CET.

=== Summary ===
The first legs were played on 7 March, and the second legs were played on 14 March 2024.

| Team 1 | Agg. | Team 2 | 1st leg | 2nd leg |
|---|---|---|---|---|
| Servette (Switzerland) | 0–0 (1–3 p) | (Czech Republic) Viktoria Plzeň | 0–0 | 0–0 (a.e.t.) |
| Ajax (Netherlands) | 0–4 | (England) Aston Villa | 0–0 | 0–4 |
| Molde (Norway) | 2–4 | (Belgium) Club Brugge | 2–1 | 0–3 |
| Union Saint-Gilloise (Belgium) | 1–3 | (Turkey) Fenerbahçe | 0–3 | 1–0 |
| Dinamo Zagreb (Croatia) | 3–5 | (Greece) PAOK | 2–0 | 1–5 |
| Sturm Graz (Austria) | 1–4 | (France) Lille | 0–3 | 1–1 |
| Maccabi Haifa (Israel) | 4–5 | (Italy) Fiorentina | 3–4 | 1–1 |
| Olympiacos (Greece) | 7–5 | (Israel) Maccabi Tel Aviv | 1–4 | 6–1 (a.e.t.) |

=== Matches ===
7 March 2024
21:00

| Servette (Switzerland) | 0–0 | (Czech Republic) Viktoria Plzeň |
|---|---|---|
| | Report |

Stade de Genève, Geneva
Attendance: 15,354
Referee: Morten Krogh (Denmark)
14 March 2024
18:45

| Viktoria Plzeň (Czech Republic) | 0–0 (a.e.t.) | (Switzerland) Servette |
|---|---|---|
| | Report |
Penalties
| Chorý (penalty scored); Mosquera (penalty scored); Šulc (penalty scored) | 3–1 | (penalty missed) Stevanović; (penalty scored) Gullemenot; (penalty missed) Severin; (penalty missed) Tsunemoto |

Doosan Arena, Plzeň
Attendance: 11,225
Referee: Willie Collum (Scotland)

0–0 on aggregate; Viktoria Plzeň won 3–1 on penalties.

7 March 2024
18:45

| Ajax (Netherlands) | 0–0 | (England) Aston Villa |
|---|---|---|
| | Report |

Johan Cruyff Arena, Amsterdam
Attendance: 52,197
Referee: Enea Jorgji (Albania)
14 March 2024
21:00 (20:00 UTC+0)

| Aston Villa (England) | 4–0 | (Netherlands) Ajax |
|---|---|---|
| Watkins 25'; Bailey 60'; Durán 75'; Diaby 81' | Report |

Villa Park, Birmingham
Attendance: 37,916
Referee: Orel Grinfeld (Israel)

Aston Villa won 4–0 on aggregate.

7 March 2024
18:45

| Molde (Norway) | 2–1 | (Belgium) Club Brugge |
|---|---|---|
| Stenevik 43'; Gulbrandsen 90+2' | Report | De Cuyper 85' (pen.) |

Aker Stadion, Molde
Attendance: 9,267
Referee: Filip Glova (Slovakia)
14 March 2024
21:00

| Club Brugge (Belgium) | 3–0 | (Norway) Molde |
|---|---|---|
| Skov Olsen 45+1', 48'; Skóraś 70' | Report |

Jan Breydel Stadium, Bruges
Attendance: 11,858
Referee: Radu Petrescu (Romania)

Club Brugge won 4–2 on aggregate.

7 March 2024
21:00

| Union Saint-Gilloise (Belgium) | 0–3 | (Turkey) Fenerbahçe |
|---|---|---|
| | Report | Batshuayi 20'; Oosterwolde 84'; Tadić 90+4' (pen.) |

Constant Vanden Stock Stadium, Brussels
Attendance: 13,522
Referee: João Pinheiro (Portugal)
14 March 2024
18:45 (20:45 UTC+3)

| Fenerbahçe (Turkey) | 0–1 | (Belgium) Union Saint-Gilloise |
|---|---|---|
| | Report | Rasmussen 68' |

Şükrü Saracoğlu Stadium, Istanbul
Attendance: 35,605
Referee: Nikola Dabanović (Montenegro)

Fenerbahçe won 3–1 on aggregate.

7 March 2024
21:00

| Dinamo Zagreb (Croatia) | 2–0 | (Greece) PAOK |
|---|---|---|
| Petković 37', 71' | Report |

Stadion Maksimir, Zagreb
Attendance: 18,562
Referee: Aliyar Aghayev (Azerbaijan)
14 March 2024
18:45 (19:45 UTC+2)

| PAOK (Greece) | 5–1 | (Croatia) Dinamo Zagreb |
|---|---|---|
| Rahman 27'; Sučić 33' (o.g.); Brandon 42'; Koulierakis 72'; A. Živković 88' (pen.) | Report | Hoxha 49' |

Toumba Stadium, Thessaloniki
Attendance: 19,701
Referee: Harm Osmers (Germany)

PAOK won 5–3 on aggregate.

7 March 2024
18:45

| Sturm Graz (Austria) | 0–3 | (France) Lille |
|---|---|---|
| | Report | David 28', 51'; Zhegrova 71' |

Liebenauer Stadium, Graz
Attendance: 13,825
Referee: Bartosz Frankowski (Poland)
14 March 2024
21:00

| Lille (France) | 1–1 | (Austria) Sturm Graz |
|---|---|---|
| Santos 43' | Report | Biereth 45+1' |

Stade Pierre-Mauroy, Villeneuve-d'Ascq
Attendance: 17,888
Referee: Matej Jug (Slovenia)

Lille won 4–1 on aggregate.

7 March 2024
21:00

| Maccabi Haifa (Israel) | 3–4 | (Italy) Fiorentina |
|---|---|---|
| Seck 12'; Kinda 29'; Khalaily 67' | Report | Nzola 2'; Beltrán 58'; Mandragora 73'; Barák 90+5' |

Bozsik Aréna, Budapest, Hungary
Attendance: 1,589
Referee: Donatas Rumšas (Lithuania)
14 March 2024
18:45

| Fiorentina (Italy) | 1–1 | (Israel) Maccabi Haifa |
|---|---|---|
| Barák 59' | Report | Khalaily 88' |

Stadio Artemio Franchi, Florence
Attendance: 6,838
Referee: Irfan Peljto (Bosnia and Herzegovina)

Fiorentina won 5–4 on aggregate.

7 March 2024
18:45 (19:45 UTC+2)

| Olympiacos (Greece) | 1–4 | (Israel) Maccabi Tel Aviv |
|---|---|---|
| El Kaabi 13' | Report | Zahavi 4', 30'; Shahar 9'; Peretz 74' |

Karaiskakis Stadium, Piraeus
Attendance: 31,054
Referee: Craig Pawson (England)
14 March 2024
21:00

| Maccabi Tel Aviv (Israel) | 1–6 (a.e.t.) | (Greece) Olympiacos |
|---|---|---|
| Zahavi 57' (pen.) | Report | Podence 10'; Fortounis 36'; El Kaabi 45+3', 65'; Jovetić 93'; El-Arabi 103' |

TSC Arena, Bačka Topola, Serbia (Note: Due to the Gaza war, Maccabi Tel Aviv played their home match at a neutral venue.)
Attendance: 370
Referee: Maurizio Mariani (Italy)

Olympiacos won 7–5 on aggregate.

== Quarter-finals ==
The draw for the quarter-finals was held on 15 March 2024, 14:00 CET.

=== Summary ===
The first legs were played on 11 April, and the second legs were played on 18 April 2024.

| Team 1 | Agg. | Team 2 | 1st leg | 2nd leg |
|---|---|---|---|---|
| Club Brugge (Belgium) | 3–0 | (Greece) PAOK | 1–0 | 2–0 |
| Olympiacos (Greece) | 3–3 (3–2 p) | (Turkey) Fenerbahçe | 3–2 | 0–1 (a.e.t.) |
| Aston Villa (England) | 3–3 (4–3 p) | (France) Lille | 2–1 | 1–2 (a.e.t.) |
| Viktoria Plzeň (Czech Republic) | 0–2 | (Italy) Fiorentina | 0–0 | 0–2 (a.e.t.) |

=== Matches ===
11 April 2024
21:00

| Club Brugge (Belgium) | 1–0 | (Greece) PAOK |
|---|---|---|
| Vetlesen 6' | Report |

Jan Breydel Stadium, Bruges
Attendance: 19,917
Referee: Daniel Siebert (Germany)
18 April 2024
21:00 (22:00 UTC+3)

| PAOK (Greece) | 0–2 | (Belgium) Club Brugge |
|---|---|---|
| | Report | Jutglà 33', 45' |

Toumba Stadium, Thessaloniki
Attendance: 24,738
Referee: Davide Massa (Italy)

Club Brugge won 3–0 on aggregate.

11 April 2024
18:45 (19:45 UTC+3)

| Olympiacos (Greece) | 3–2 | (Turkey) Fenerbahçe |
|---|---|---|
| Fortounis 8'; Jovetić 32'; Chiquinho 57' | Report | Tadić 68' (pen.); Kahveci 74' |

Karaiskakis Stadium, Piraeus
Attendance: 32,000
Referee: Sandro Schärer (Switzerland)
18 April 2024
21:00 (22:00 UTC+3)

| Fenerbahçe (Turkey) | 1–0 (a.e.t.) | (Greece) Olympiacos |
|---|---|---|
| Kahveci 11' | Report |
Penalties
| Tadić (penalty missed); Batshuayi (penalty scored); Ünder (penalty missed); Djiku (penalty scored); Bonucci (penalty missed) | 2–3 | (penalty scored) El Kaabi; (penalty missed) El-Arabi; (penalty scored) Horta; (penalty scored) Masouras; (penalty missed) Rodinei |

Şükrü Saracoğlu Stadium, Istanbul
Attendance: 44,040
Referee: Tobias Stieler (Germany)

3–3 on aggregate; Olympiacos won 3–2 on penalties.

11 April 2024
21:00 (20:00 UTC+1)

| Aston Villa (England) | 2–1 | (France) Lille |
|---|---|---|
| Watkins 13'; McGinn 56' | Report | Diakité 84' |

Villa Park, Birmingham
Attendance: 37,220
Referee: Espen Eskås (Norway)
18 April 2024
18:45

| Lille (France) | 2–1 (a.e.t.) | (England) Aston Villa |
|---|---|---|
| Yazıcı 15'; André 68' | Report | Cash 87' |
Penalties
| Bentaleb (penalty missed); David (penalty scored); Gomes (penalty scored); Cabella (penalty scored); André (penalty missed) | 3–4 | (penalty scored) Tielemans; (penalty scored) Watkins; (penalty scored) Cash; (penalty missed) Bailey; (penalty scored) Douglas Luiz |

Stade Pierre-Mauroy, Villeneuve-d'Ascq
Attendance: 47,093
Referee: Ivan Kružliak (Slovakia)

3–3 on aggregate; Aston Villa won 4–3 on penalties.

11 April 2024
18:45

| Viktoria Plzeň (Czech Republic) | 0–0 | (Italy) Fiorentina |
|---|---|---|
| | Report |

Doosan Arena, Plzeň
Attendance: 11,470
Referee: Orel Grinfeld (Israel)
18 April 2024
18:45

| Fiorentina (Italy) | 2–0 (a.e.t.) | (Czech Republic) Viktoria Plzeň |
|---|---|---|
| González 92'; Biraghi 108' | Report |

Stadio Artemio Franchi, Florence
Attendance: 19,418
Referee: Jesús Gil Manzano (Spain)

Fiorentina won 2–0 on aggregate.

== Semi-finals ==
The draw for the semi-finals was held on 15 March 2024, 14:00 CET, after the quarter-final draw.

=== Summary ===
The first legs were played on 2 May, and the second legs were played on 8 and 9 May 2024.

| Team 1 | Agg. | Team 2 | 1st leg | 2nd leg |
|---|---|---|---|---|
| Aston Villa (England) | 2–6 | (Greece) Olympiacos | 2–4 | 0–2 |
| Fiorentina (Italy) | 4–3 | (Belgium) Club Brugge | 3–2 | 1–1 |

=== Matches ===
2 May 2024
21:00 (20:00 UTC+1)

| Aston Villa (England) | 2–4 | (Greece) Olympiacos |
|---|---|---|
| Watkins 45+1'; Diaby 52' | Report | El Kaabi 16', 29', 56' (pen.); Hezze 67' |

Villa Park, Birmingham
Attendance: 41,220
Referee: Marco Guida (Italy)
9 May 2024
21:00 (22:00 UTC+3)

| Olympiacos (Greece) | 2–0 | (England) Aston Villa |
|---|---|---|
| El Kaabi 10', 78' | Report |

Karaiskakis Stadium, Piraeus
Attendance: 33,000
Referee: Felix Zwayer (Germany)

Olympiacos won 6–2 on aggregate.

2 May 2024
21:00

| Fiorentina (Italy) | 3–2 | (Belgium) Club Brugge |
|---|---|---|
| Sottil 5'; Belotti 37'; Nzola 90+1' | Report | Vanaken 17' (pen.); Thiago 63' |

Stadio Artemio Franchi, Florence
Attendance: 27,516
Referee: Michael Oliver (England)
8 May 2024 (Note: The Club Brugge v Fiorentina match was rescheduled due to the Holy Blood Procession on 9 May 2024.)
18:45

| Club Brugge (Belgium) | 1–1 | (Italy) Fiorentina |
|---|---|---|
| Vanaken 20' | Report | Beltrán 85' (pen.) |

Jan Breydel Stadium, Bruges
Attendance: 26,936
Referee: Halil Umut Meler (Turkey)

Fiorentina won 4–3 on aggregate.

== Final ==
The final was played on 29 May 2024 at the Agia Sophia Stadium in Athens, Greece. A draw was held on 15 March 2024, after the quarter-final and semi-final draws, to determine the "home" team for administrative purposes.

29 May 2024
21:00 (22:00 UTC+3)

| Olympiacos (Greece) | 1–0 (a.e.t.) | (Italy) Fiorentina |
|---|---|---|
| El Kaabi 116' | Report |

Agia Sophia Stadium, Athens
Attendance: 26,842
Referee: Artur Soares Dias (Portugal)
