= Danyil Alefirenko =

Ukrainian footballer

Personal information
- Full name: Danyil Serhiyovych Alefirenko
- Date of birth: 19 April 2000 (age 26)
- Place of birth: Kharkiv, Ukraine
- Height: 1.76 m (5 ft 9 in)
- Position: Forward

Team information
- Current team: Chornomorets Odesa
- Number: 7

Youth career
- 2013–2017: Metalist Kharkiv
- 2017–2018: Zorya Luhansk

Senior career*
Years	Team	Apps	(Gls)
2018–2024	Zorya Luhansk	19	(3)
2023	→ Chornomorets Odesa (loan)	14	(8)
2024–2026	Kolos Kovalivka	47	(1)
2026–	Chornomorets Odesa	8	(0)

International career^{‡}
2018	Ukraine U18	3	(0)
2021–2023	Ukraine U21	11	(1)
- * Club domestic league appearances and goals as of 26 October 2026 ‡ National team caps and goals as of 16 June 2023

Danyil Serhiyovych Alefirenko (Ukrainian: Даниїл Сергійович Алефіренко; born 19 April 2000) is a Ukrainian professional footballer who plays as a forward for Chornomorets Odesa.

== Career ==
Born in Kharkiv, Alefirenko is a product of the Metalist Kharkiv youth sportive school system.

In July 2017, he was signed by Zorya Luhansk and he made his debut for this club as a second half-time substituted player in the winning home match against FC Inhulets Petrove on 11 April 2021 in the Ukrainian Premier League.

In the 2022–23 season, Alefirenko played for Chornomorets Odesa on loan, and became the top scorer of the club.

On 24 June 2024, he signed with Kolos Kovalivka.

On 27 June 2026, Alefirenko for the second time in his career joined Chornomorets Odesa.
