= 2023–24 UEFA Europa Conference League qualifying =

Europa Conference League

2023–24 UEFA Europa Conference League qualifying was the preliminary phase of the 2023–24 UEFA Europa Conference League, prior to the competition proper. Qualification consisted of the qualifying phase (first to third rounds) and the play-off round. It began on 12 July and ended on 31 August 2023.

A total of 160 teams competed in the qualifying system, with 23 teams in the Champions Path and 137 teams in the Main Path. The 22 winners of the play-off round advanced to the group stage, to join the 10 losers of the Europa League play-off round.

Times are CEST (UTC+2), as listed by UEFA (local times, if different, are in parentheses).

== Teams ==
=== Champions Path ===
The Champions Path included league champions which were eliminated from the Champions Path qualifying phase of the Champions League and the Champions Path qualifying phase of the Europa League and consisted of the following rounds:

- Second qualifying round (16 teams): 16 teams which entered this round (including 13 losers of the Champions League first qualifying round and 3 losers of the Champions League preliminary qualifying round).
- Third qualifying round (10 teams): 8 winners of the second qualifying round and 2 losers of the Champions League first qualifying round which were drawn to receive byes.
- Play-off round (10 teams): 5 teams which entered this round (including 5 losers of the Europa League Champions Path third qualifying round) and 5 winners of the third qualifying round.

Below were the participating teams of the Champions Path (with their 2023 UEFA club coefficients, not to be used as seeding for the Champions Path, however), grouped by their starting rounds.

Key to colours
Winners of play-off round advanced to group stage

Play-off round
Team	Coeff.
(Belarus) BATE Borisov	15.000
(Kazakhstan) Astana	14.000
(Lithuania) Žalgiris	11.000
(Finland) HJK	11.000
(Iceland) Breiðablik	6.000

Third qualifying round
Team	Coeff.
(Estonia) Flora	10.500
(Gibraltar) Lincoln Red Imps	8.500

Second qualifying round
Team	Coeff.
(Hungary) Ferencváros	27.000
(Republic of Ireland) Shamrock Rovers	9.000
(Wales) The New Saints	9.000
(Montenegro) Budućnost Podgorica	7.500
(Georgia (country)) Dinamo Tbilisi	7.500
(Albania) Partizani	5.000
(Romania) Farul Constanța	4.100
(San Marino) Tre Penne	4.000
(Latvia) Valmiera	3.500
(Kosovo) Ballkani	3.000
(Northern Ireland) Larne	3.000
(Armenia) Urartu	3.000
(Malta) Hamrun Spartans	2.500
(Luxembourg) Swift Hesperange	1.800
(North Macedonia) Struga	1.100
(Andorra) Atlètic Club d'Escaldes	1.033

Notes

1. ^{UEL CH Q3} Losers of Europa League third qualifying round (Champions Path).
2. ^{UCL Q1} Losers of Champions League first qualifying round.
3. ^{UCL PR F} Losers of Champions League preliminary round final.
4. ^{UCL PR SF} Losers of Champions League preliminary round semi-finals.

=== Main Path ===
The Main Path included league non-champions and consisted of the following rounds:

- First qualifying round (62 teams): 62 teams which entered in this round.
- Second qualifying round (90 teams): 59 teams which entered in this round and 31 winners of the first qualifying round.
- Third qualifying round (54 teams): nine teams which entered in this round and 45 winners of the second qualifying round.
- Play-off round (34 teams): seven teams which entered this round (including two losers of the Europa League Main Path third qualifying round) and 27 winners of the third qualifying round.

Below were the participating teams of the League Path (with their 2022 UEFA club coefficients), grouped by their starting rounds.

Key to colours
Winners of play-off round advanced to group stage

Play-off round
Team	Coeff.
(Germany) Eintracht Frankfurt	77.000
(France) Lille	30.000
(England) Aston Villa	21.914
(Italy) Fiorentina	20.000
(Spain) Osasuna	18.599
(Belgium) Genk	18.000
(Ukraine) Dnipro-1	8.000

Third qualifying round
Team	Coeff.
(Netherlands) AZ	47.500
(Ukraine) Dynamo Kyiv	35.000
(Serbia) Partizan	25.500
(Austria) Rapid Wien	18.500
(Portugal) Arouca	11.243
(Croatia) Hajduk Split	9.000
(Scotland) Heart of Midlothian	7.280
(Norway) Brann	5.800
(Denmark) Nordsjælland	5.565

Second qualifying round
Team	Coeff.
(Belgium) Club Brugge	54.000
(Switzerland) Basel	53.000
(Belgium) Gent	37.500
(Turkey) Fenerbahçe	30.000
(Romania) CFR Cluj	27.500
(Denmark) Midtjylland	25.500
(Greece) PAOK	25.000
(Israel) Maccabi Tel Aviv	24.000
(Czech Republic) Viktoria Plzeň	22.000
(Norway) Bodø/Glimt	20.000
(Poland) Lech Poznań	19.000
(Israel) Hapoel Be'er Sheva	17.000
(Sweden) Djurgårdens IF	16.500
(Cyprus) APOEL	14.500
(Turkey) Beşiktaş	14.000
(Bulgaria) CSKA Sofia	13.000
(Netherlands) Twente	11.980
(Croatia) Rijeka	11.500
(Portugal) Vitória de Guimarães	11.243
(Romania) FCSB	11.000
(Poland) Legia Warsaw	11.000
(Norway) Rosenborg	11.000
(Slovakia) Spartak Trnava	10.500
(Cyprus) AEK Larnaca	10.000
(Cyprus) Omonia	10.000
(Finland) KuPS	9.500
(Azerbaijan) Neftçi	9.000
(Croatia) Osijek	8.000
(Scotland) Hibernian	7.280
(Greece) Aris	7.000
Austria Wien	6.800
(Moldova) Petrocub Hîncești	6.500
(Kosovo) Drita	6.500
(Serbia) Vojvodina	6.475
(Turkey) Adana Demirspor	6.420
(Switzerland) Luzern	6.335
(Ukraine) Vorskla Poltava	6.000
(Czech Republic) Bohemians 1905	5.810
(Denmark) AGF	5.565
(Israel) Beitar Jerusalem	5.000
(Sweden) Hammarby IF	4.750
(Sweden) Kalmar FF	4.750
(Bulgaria) Levski Sofia	4.500
(Lithuania) Kauno Žalgiris	4.500
(Poland) Pogoń Szczecin	4.150
(Hungary) Debrecen	4.125
(Hungary) Zalaegerszeg	4.125
(Hungary) Kecskemét	4.125
(Romania) Sepsi OSK	4.100
(Azerbaijan) Gabala	4.000
(Bosnia and Herzegovina) Borac Banja Luka	4.000
(Bulgaria) CSKA 1948	4.000
(Azerbaijan) Sabah	3.325
(Kazakhstan) Ordabasy	2.525
(Kazakhstan) Aktobe	2.525
(Slovenia) Celje	2.500
(Latvia) Auda	2.125
(Luxembourg) Differdange 03	2.000
(Belarus) Torpedo-BelAZ Zhodino	1.975

First qualifying round
Team	Coeff.
(Luxembourg) F91 Dudelange	10.000
(Latvia) Riga	10.000
(Slovenia) Maribor	9.500
(North Macedonia) Shkëndija	9.500
(Northern Ireland) Linfield	8.500
(Liechtenstein) Vaduz	8.500
(Slovakia) DAC Dunajská Streda	8.500
(Republic of Ireland) Dundalk	8.500
(Armenia) Pyunik	8.000
(Armenia) Alashkert	8.000
(Montenegro) Sutjeska	7.500
(North Macedonia) Shkupi	7.000
(Bosnia and Herzegovina) Sarajevo	7.000
(Latvia) RFS	6.500
(Kazakhstan) Tobol	6.500
(Faroe Islands) B36	6.500
Ararat-Armenia	6.500
(Malta) Gżira United	6.000
(Estonia) FCI Levadia	6.000
(Belarus) Dinamo Minsk	5.500
(Wales) Connah's Quay Nomads	5.500
(Moldova) Milsami Orhei	5.000
(San Marino) La Fiorita	5.000
(Faroe Islands) HB	5.000
(Gibraltar) Europa	5.000
(Slovenia) Domžale	5.000
(Andorra) FC Santa Coloma	5.000
(Luxembourg) Progrès Niederkorn	5.000
(Georgia (country)) Dinamo Batumi	4.500
(Andorra) Inter Club d'Escaldes	4.500
(Northern Ireland) Crusaders	4.500
(Estonia) Paide Linnameeskond	4.000
(Albania) Tirana	4.000
(Slovakia) Žilina	3.950
(Georgia (country)) Torpedo Kutaisi	3.500
(Iceland) Víkingur Reykjavík	3.000
(Republic of Ireland) St Patrick's Athletic	3.000
(Albania) Vllaznia	3.000
(Faroe Islands) Víkingur Gøta	3.000
(Republic of Ireland) Derry City	3.000
(North Macedonia) Makedonija GP	2.500
(Lithuania) Panevėžys	2.500
(Finland) Honka	2.500
(Bosnia and Herzegovina) Željezničar	2.500
(Malta) Balzan	2.500
(Moldova) Zimbru Chișinău	2.450
(Kosovo) Gjilani	2.208
(Kosovo) Dukagjini	2.208
(Finland) Haka	2.050
(Georgia (country)) Dila Gori	2.000
(Malta) Birkirkara	2.000
(Northern Ireland) Glentoran	2.000
(Estonia) Narva Trans	2.000
(Lithuania) Hegelmann	2.000
(Belarus) Neman Grodno	1.975
(Iceland) KA	1.450
(Albania) Egnatia	1.250
(Wales) Penybont	1.233
(Wales) Haverfordwest County	1.233
(Gibraltar) FCB Magpies	1.158
(Montenegro) Arsenal Tivat	0.950
(San Marino) Cosmos	0.399

Notes

1. ^{UEL MP Q3} Losers of Europa League third qualifying round (Main Path).

== Format ==
Each tie was played over two legs, with each team playing one leg at home. The team that scored more goals on aggregate over the two legs advanced to the next round. If the aggregate score was level at the end of normal time of the second leg, extra time would be played and if the same number of goals are scored by both teams during extra time, the tie would be decided by a penalty shoot-out.

== Schedule ==
The schedule of the competition was as follows (all draws were held at the UEFA headquarters in Nyon, Switzerland).

Schedule for the qualifying phase of the 2022–23 UEFA Europa Conference League
Round	Draw date	First leg	Second leg
First qualifying round	20 June 2023	13 July 2023	20 July 2023
Second qualifying round	21 June 2023	27 July 2023	3 August 2023
Third qualifying round	24 July 2023	10 August 2023	17 August 2023
Play-off round	7 August 2023	24 August 2023	31 August 2023

== First qualifying round ==
The draw for the first qualifying round was held on 20 June 2023.

=== Seeding ===
A total of 62 teams took part in the first qualifying round. Seeding of teams was based on their 2023 UEFA club coefficients. Teams from the same association could not be drawn against each other.

Prior to the draw, UEFA formed five groups of five seeded and five unseeded teams and one group of six seeded and six unseeded teams in accordance with the principles set by the Club Competitions Committee. The first team drawn in each tie was the home team of the first leg.

Group 1		Group 2		Group 3	
Seeded	Unseeded	Seeded	Unseeded	Seeded	Unseeded
Ararat-Armenia (1); (Montenegro) Sutjeska (2); (Bosnia and Herzegovina) Sarajevo (3); (Liechtenstein) Vaduz (4); (Slovenia) Domžale (5)	(Georgia (country)) Torpedo Kutaisi (6); (Malta) Balzan (7); (Belarus) Neman Grodno (8); (Albania) Egnatia (9); (San Marino) Cosmos (10)	(Slovenia) Maribor (1); (Armenia) Alashkert (2); (Georgia (country)) Dinamo Batumi (3); (San Marino) La Fiorita (4); (Belarus) Dinamo Minsk (5)	(Albania) Tirana (6); (Bosnia and Herzegovina) Željezničar (7); (Moldova) Zimbru Chișinău (8); (Malta) Birkirkara (9); (Montenegro) Arsenal Tivat (10)	(Northern Ireland) Linfield (1); (Republic of Ireland) Dundalk (2); (Wales) Connah's Quay Nomads (3); (Luxembourg) Progrès Niederkorn (4); (Andorra) Inter Club d'Escaldes (5)	(Iceland) KA (6); (Faroe Islands) Víkingur Gøta (7); (Kosovo) Gjilani (8); (Albania) Vllaznia (9); (Gibraltar) FCB Magpies (10)
Group 4		Group 5		Group 6	
Seeded	Unseeded	Seeded	Unseeded	Seeded	Unseeded
(Latvia) Riga (1); (North Macedonia) Shkëndija (2); (Estonia) FCI Levadia (3); (Faroe Islands) HB (4); (Northern Ireland) Crusaders (5)	(Slovakia) Žilina (6); (Finland) Haka (7); (Republic of Ireland) Derry City (8); (Iceland) Víkingur Reykjavík (9); (Wales) Haverfordwest County (10)	(Slovakia) DAC Dunajská Streda (1); (Armenia) Pyunik (2); (Latvia) RFS (3); (Kazakhstan) Tobol (4); (Moldova) Milsami Orhei (5)	(North Macedonia) Makedonija GP (6); (Lithuania) Panevėžys (7); (Finland) Honka (8); (Georgia (country)) Dila Gori (9); (Estonia) Narva Trans (10)	(Luxembourg) F91 Dudelange (1); (North Macedonia) Shkupi (2); (Faroe Islands) B36 (3); (Malta) Gżira United (4); (Gibraltar) Europa (5); (Andorra) FC Santa Coloma (6)	(Estonia) Paide Linnameeskond (7); (Republic of Ireland) St Patrick's Athletic (8); (Kosovo) Dukagjini (9); (Northern Ireland) Glentoran (10); (Lithuania) Hegelmann (11); (Wales) Penybont (12)

=== Summary ===
The first legs were played on 12 and 13 July, and the second legs were played on 18 and 20 July 2023.

The winners of the ties advanced to the Main Path second qualifying round. The losers were eliminated from European competitions for the season.

Team 1	Agg.	Team 2	1st leg	2nd leg
Sutjeska (Montenegro)	2–1	(San Marino) Cosmos	1–0	1–1
Domžale (Slovenia)	4–5 (Note: Order of legs reversed after original draw.)	(Malta) Balzan	1–4	3–1 (a.e.t.)
Vaduz (Liechtenstein)	2–3	(Belarus) Neman Grodno	1–2	1–1
Ararat-Armenia	5–5 (4–2 p)	(Albania) Egnatia	1–1	4–4 (a.e.t.)
Torpedo Kutaisi (Georgia (country))	3–3 (4–2 p)	(Bosnia and Herzegovina) Sarajevo	2–2	1–1 (a.e.t.)
Alashkert (Armenia)	7–2	(Montenegro) Arsenal Tivat	1–1	6–1
Željezničar (Bosnia and Herzegovina)	4–3	(Belarus) Dinamo Minsk	2–2	2–1
La Fiorita (San Marino)	1–2	(Moldova) Zimbru Chișinău	1–1	0–1
Maribor (Slovenia)	3–2	(Malta) Birkirkara	1–1	2–1
Tirana (Albania)	3–2	(Georgia (country)) Dinamo Batumi	1–1	2–1
FCB Magpies (Gibraltar)	1–3	(Republic of Ireland) Dundalk	0–0	1–3
Inter Club d'Escaldes (Andorra)	3–2	(Faroe Islands) Víkingur Gøta	2–1	1–1
Progrès Niederkorn (Luxembourg)	4–2	(Kosovo) Gjilani	2–2	2–0
Linfield (Northern Ireland)	3–2	(Albania) Vllaznia	3–1	0–1
KA (Iceland)	4–0	(Wales) Connah's Quay Nomads	2–0	2–0
Shkëndija (North Macedonia)	1–1 (2–3 p)	(Wales) Haverfordwest County	1–0	0–1 (a.e.t.)
Haka (Finland)	2–3	(Northern Ireland) Crusaders	2–2	0–1
HB (Faroe Islands)	0–1	(Republic of Ireland) Derry City	0–0	0–1
Riga (Latvia)	2–1	(Iceland) Víkingur Reykjavík	2–0	0–1
Žilina (Slovakia)	4–2	(Estonia) FCI Levadia	2–1	2–1
Pyunik (Armenia)	5–0	(Estonia) Narva Trans	2–0	3–0
Panevėžys (Lithuania)	3–2	(Moldova) Milsami Orhei	2–2	1–0
Tobol (Kazakhstan)	2–1	(Finland) Honka	2–1	0–0
DAC Dunajská Streda (Slovakia)	2–3	(Georgia (country)) Dila Gori	2–1	0–2
Makedonija GP (North Macedonia)	1–5	(Latvia) RFS	0–1	1–4
Dukagjini (Kosovo)	5–3	(Gibraltar) Europa	2–1	3–2
Penybont (Wales)	1–3	(Andorra) FC Santa Coloma	1–1	0–2 (a.e.t.)
Hegelmann (Lithuania)	0–5	(North Macedonia) Shkupi	0–5	0–0
F91 Dudelange (Luxembourg)	5–3	(Republic of Ireland) St Patrick's Athletic	2–1	3–2
B36 (Faroe Islands)	2–0	(Estonia) Paide Linnameeskond	0–0	2–0 (a.e.t.)
Gżira United (Malta)	3–3 (14–13 p)	(Northern Ireland) Glentoran	2–2	1–1 (a.e.t.)

== Second qualifying round ==
The draw for the second qualifying round was made on 21 June 2023.

=== Seeding ===
A total of 106 teams took part in the second qualifying round. They were divided into two paths:

- Champions Path (16 teams): The teams, whose identity was not known at the time of draw, was seeded as follows:
  - Seeded: 13 of the 15 losers of the 2023–24 UEFA Champions League first qualifying round (two of the teams received byes to the third qualifying round).
  - Unseeded: 3 losers of the 2023–24 UEFA Champions League preliminary round.
- Main Path (90 teams): 59 teams which entered in this round and 31 winners of the first qualifying round. Seeding of teams was based on their 2023 UEFA club coefficients. For the winners of the first qualifying round, whose identity was not known at the time of the draw, the club coefficient of the highest-ranked remaining team in each tie was used. Teams from the same association could not be drawn against each other.

Prior to the draw, UEFA formed three groups in the Champions Path with two groups of five seeded teams and one unseeded team, one group of three seeded teams and one unseeded team, and nine groups in the Main Path of five seeded teams and five unseeded teams, in accordance with the principles set by the Club Competitions Committee. In each group of the Champions Path, firstly, a seeded team was drawn against the only unseeded team, and then, the remaining seeded teams were drawn against each other. In the Main Path, numbers were pre-assigned for each team by UEFA, with the draw held in one run for Groups 1–9 with ten teams. The first team drawn in each tie was the home team of the first leg.

Champions Path
Group 1		Group 2		Group 3	
Seeded	Unseeded	Seeded	Unseeded	Seeded	Unseeded
(Hungary) Ferencváros; (Luxembourg) Swift Hesperange; (Republic of Ireland) Shamrock Rovers; (Wales) The New Saints; (Latvia) Valmiera	(San Marino) Tre Penne	(Romania) Farul Constanța; (Albania) Partizani; (Georgia (country)) Dinamo Tbilisi; (Malta) Hamrun Spartans; (Armenia) Urartu	(Andorra) Atlètic Club d'Escaldes	(Kosovo) Ballkani; (North Macedonia) Struga; (Northern Ireland) Larne	(Montenegro) Budućnost Podgorica

Main Path
Group 1		Group 2		Group 3	
Seeded	Unseeded	Seeded	Unseeded	Seeded	Unseeded
(Sweden) Djurgårdens IF (1); (Croatia) Rijeka (2); (Portugal) Vitória de Guimarães (3); (Luxembourg) F91 Dudelange (4); (Montenegro) Sutjeska (5)	(Switzerland) Luzern (6); (Malta) Gżira United (7); (Kosovo) Dukagjini (8); (Andorra) FC Santa Coloma (9); (Slovenia) Celje (10)	(Romania) CFR Cluj (1); (Israel) Hapoel Be'er Sheva (2); (Poland) Legia Warsaw (3); (Georgia (country)) Dila Gori (4); (Latvia) RFS (5)	(Turkey) Adana Demirspor (6); (Ukraine) Vorskla Poltava (7); (Lithuania) Panevėžys (8); (Azerbaijan) Sabah (9); (Kazakhstan) Ordabasy (10)	(Cyprus) APOEL (1); (Turkey) Beşiktaş (2); (Romania) FCSB (3); (Azerbaijan) Neftçi (4); (Armenia) Alashkert (5)	(Serbia) Vojvodina (6); (Bosnia and Herzegovina) Željezničar (7); (Albania) Tirana (8); (Hungary) Debrecen (9); (Bulgaria) CSKA 1948 (10)
Group 4		Group 5		Group 6	
Seeded	Unseeded	Seeded	Unseeded	Seeded	Unseeded
(Norway) Bodø/Glimt (1); (Poland) Lech Poznań (2); (Slovakia) Spartak Trnava (3); (Armenia) Pyunik (4); (Croatia) Osijek (5)	(Czech Republic) Bohemians 1905 (6); (Sweden) Kalmar FF (7); (Lithuania) Kauno Žalgiris (8); (Hungary) Zalaegerszeg (9); (Latvia) Auda (10)	(Belgium) Club Brugge (1); (Netherlands) Twente (2); (Norway) Rosenborg (3); (Republic of Ireland) Dundalk (4); (Scotland) Hibernian (5)	(Denmark) AGF (6); (Iceland) KA (7); (Sweden) Hammarby IF (8); (Andorra) Inter Club d'Escaldes (9); (Northern Ireland) Crusaders (10)	(Switzerland) Basel (1); (Czech Republic) Viktoria Plzeň (2); (Slovenia) Maribor (3); (Wales) Haverfordwest County (4); Austria Wien (5)	(Kazakhstan) Tobol (6); (Faroe Islands) B36 (7); (Kosovo) Drita (8); (Bosnia and Herzegovina) Borac Banja Luka (9); (Luxembourg) Differdange 03 (10)
Group 7		Group 8		Group 9	
Seeded	Unseeded	Seeded	Unseeded	Seeded	Unseeded
(Israel) Maccabi Tel Aviv (1); (Bulgaria) CSKA Sofia (2); (Cyprus) AEK Larnaca (3); (Greece) Aris (4); (Georgia (country)) Torpedo Kutaisi (5)	(Moldova) Petrocub Hîncești (6); Ararat-Armenia (7); (Romania) Sepsi OSK (8); (Kazakhstan) Aktobe (9); (Belarus) Torpedo-BelAZ Zhodino (10)	(Belgium) Gent (1); (Denmark) Midtjylland (2); (Latvia) Riga (3); (Finland) KuPS (4); (Northern Ireland) Linfield (5)	(Slovakia) Žilina (6); (Republic of Ireland) Derry City (7); (Luxembourg) Progrès Niederkorn (8); (Poland) Pogoń Szczecin (9); (Hungary) Kecskemét (10)	(Turkey) Fenerbahçe (1); (Greece) PAOK (2); (Cyprus) Omonia (3); (Belarus) Neman Grodno (4); (North Macedonia) Shkupi (5)	(Moldova) Zimbru Chișinău (6); (Malta) Balzan (7); (Israel) Beitar Jerusalem (8); (Bulgaria) Levski Sofia (9); (Azerbaijan) Gabala (10)

1. ^{†} Winners of the first qualifying round, whose identity was not known at the time of draw. Teams in italics defeated a team with a higher coefficient, thus effectively taking the coefficient of their opponent in the draw.

=== Summary ===
The first legs were played on 25, 26 and 27 July, and the second legs were played on 1, 2 and 3 August 2023.

The winners of the ties advanced to the third qualifying round of their respective path. The losers were eliminated from European competitions for the season.

Team 1	Agg.	Team 2	1st leg	2nd leg
Champions Path
Lincoln Red Imps (Gibraltar)	Bye	N/A	—	—
Flora (Estonia)	Bye	N/A	—	—
Tre Penne (San Marino)	0–10	(Latvia) Valmiera	0–3	0–7
Ferencváros (Hungary)	6–0	(Republic of Ireland) Shamrock Rovers	4–0	2–0
The New Saints (Wales)	3–4	(Luxembourg) Swift Hesperange	1–1	2–3
Atlètic Club d'Escaldes (Andorra)	1–5	(Albania) Partizani	0–1	1–4
Hamrun Spartans (Malta)	3–1	(Georgia (country)) Dinamo Tbilisi	2–1	1–0
Farul Constanța (Romania)	6–4	(Armenia) Urartu	3–2	3–2
Struga (North Macedonia)	5–3	(Montenegro) Budućnost Podgorica	1–0	4–3
Ballkani (Kosovo)	7–1	(Northern Ireland) Larne	3–0	4–1
Main Path
Dukagjini (Kosovo)	1–7 (Note: Order of legs reversed after original draw.)	(Croatia) Rijeka	0–1	1–6
Gżira United (Malta)	3–2	(Luxembourg) F91 Dudelange	2–0	1–2
Djurgårdens IF (Sweden)	2–3	(Switzerland) Luzern	1–2	1–1
Celje (Slovenia)	4–4 (4–2 p)	(Portugal) Vitória de Guimarães	3–4	1–0 (a.e.t.)
Sutjeska (Montenegro)	2–3	(Andorra) FC Santa Coloma	2–0	0–3 (a.e.t.)
Hapoel Be'er Sheva (Israel)	2–1	(Lithuania) Panevėžys	1–0	1–1
Vorskla Poltava (Ukraine)	3–4	(Georgia (country)) Dila Gori	2–1	1–3
CFR Cluj (Romania)	2–3	(Turkey) Adana Demirspor	1–1	1–2
Ordabasy (Kazakhstan)	4–5	(Poland) Legia Warsaw	2–2	2–3
RFS (Latvia)	1–4	(Azerbaijan) Sabah	0–2	1–2
Beşiktaş (Turkey)	5–1	(Albania) Tirana	3–1	2–0
Željezničar (Bosnia and Herzegovina)	2–4	(Azerbaijan) Neftçi	2–2	0–2
APOEL (Cyprus)	4–2	(Serbia) Vojvodina	2–1	2–1
CSKA 1948 (Bulgaria)	2–4	(Romania) FCSB	0–1	2–3
Alashkert (Armenia)	2–2 (1–3 p)	(Hungary) Debrecen	0–1	2–1 (a.e.t.)
Lech Poznań (Poland)	5–2	(Lithuania) Kauno Žalgiris	3–1	2–1
Kalmar FF (Sweden)	2–4	(Armenia) Pyunik	1–2	1–2
Bodø/Glimt (Norway)	7–2	(Czech Republic) Bohemians 1905	3–0	4–2
Auda (Latvia)	2–5	(Slovakia) Spartak Trnava	1–1	1–4
Osijek (Croatia)	3–1	(Hungary) Zalaegerszeg	1–0	2–1
Twente (Netherlands)	2–1	(Sweden) Hammarby IF	1–0	1–1 (a.e.t.)
KA (Iceland)	5–3	(Republic of Ireland) Dundalk	3–1	2–2
Club Brugge (Belgium)	3–1	(Denmark) AGF	3–0	0–1
Crusaders (Northern Ireland)	4–5	(Norway) Rosenborg	2–2	2–3 (a.e.t.)
Inter Club d'Escaldes (Andorra)	3–7	(Scotland) Hibernian	2–1	1–6
Viktoria Plzeň (Czech Republic)	2–1	(Kosovo) Drita	0–0	2–1
B36 (Faroe Islands)	3–2	(Wales) Haverfordwest County	2–1	1–1 (a.e.t.)
Basel (Switzerland)	3–4	(Kazakhstan) Tobol	1–3	2–1
Differdange 03 (Luxembourg)	4–5	(Slovenia) Maribor	1–1	3–4 (a.e.t.)
Austria Wien	3–1	(Bosnia and Herzegovina) Borac Banja Luka	1–0	2–1
CSKA Sofia (Bulgaria)	0–6	(Romania) Sepsi OSK	0–2	0–4
Ararat-Armenia	1–2	(Greece) Aris	1–1	0–1
Maccabi Tel Aviv (Israel)	5–0	(Moldova) Petrocub Hîncești	3–0	2–0
Torpedo-BelAZ Zhodino (Belarus)	3–4	(Cyprus) AEK Larnaca	2–3	1–1
Torpedo Kutaisi (Georgia (country))	3–5	(Kazakhstan) Aktobe	1–4	2–1
Midtjylland (Denmark)	3–2	(Luxembourg) Progrès Niederkorn	2–0	1–2 (a.e.t.)
Derry City (Republic of Ireland)	5–4	(Finland) KuPS	2–1	3–3
Gent (Belgium)	10–3	(Slovakia) Žilina	5–1	5–2
Kecskemét (Hungary)	3–4	(Latvia) Riga	2–1	1–3 (a.e.t.)
Linfield (Northern Ireland)	4–8	(Poland) Pogoń Szczecin	2–5	2–3
PAOK (Greece)	4–1	(Israel) Beitar Jerusalem	0–0	4–1
Neman Grodno (Belarus)	2–0	(Malta) Balzan	2–0	0–0
Fenerbahçe (Turkey)	9–0	(Moldova) Zimbru Chișinău	5–0	4–0
Gabala (Azerbaijan)	3–7	(Cyprus) Omonia	2–3	1–4
Shkupi (North Macedonia)	0–3	(Bulgaria) Levski Sofia	0–2	0–1

== Third qualifying round ==
The draw for the third qualifying round was held on 24 July 2023.

=== Seeding ===
A total of 64 teams took part in the third qualifying round. They were divided into two paths:

- Champions Path (10 teams): eight winners of the second qualifying round (Champions Path), whose identity was not known at the time of the draw and two losers from the first qualifying round of the Champions League which received byes to this round. There was no seeding.
- Main Path (54 teams): nine teams that entered in this round and 45 winners of the second qualifying round (Main Path). Seeding of teams were based on their 2023 UEFA club coefficients. For the winners of the second qualifying round, whose identity was not known at the time of the draw, the club coefficient of the highest-ranked remaining team in each tie was used. Teams from the same association could not be drawn against each other.

Prior to the draw, UEFA formed groups of seeded teams and unseeded teams in accordance with the principles set by the Club Competitions Committee. The first team drawn in each tie was the home team of the first leg.

Champions Path
Group 1	Group 2
(Estonia) Flora; (Latvia) Valmiera; (Malta) Hamrun Spartans; (Hungary) Ferencváros; (Albania) Partizani; (Romania) Farul Constanța	(Gibraltar) Lincoln Red Imps; (Luxembourg) Swift Hesperange; (North Macedonia) Struga; (Kosovo) Ballkani

Main Path
Group 1		Group 2		Group 3	
Seeded	Unseeded	Seeded	Unseeded	Seeded	Unseeded
(Serbia) Partizan (1); (Israel) Maccabi Tel Aviv (2); (Austria) Rapid Wien (3); (Romania) Sepsi OSK (4)	(Cyprus) AEK Larnaca (5); (Hungary) Debrecen (6); (Azerbaijan) Sabah (7); (Kazakhstan) Aktobe (8)	(Netherlands) AZ (1); (Greece) PAOK (2); (Turkey) Beşiktaş (3); (Slovenia) Celje (4)	(Croatia) Hajduk Split (5); (Azerbaijan) Neftçi (6); (Andorra) FC Santa Coloma (7); (Belarus) Neman Grodno (8)	(Ukraine) Dynamo Kyiv (1); (Denmark) Midtjylland (2); (Israel) Hapoel Be'er Sheva (3); (Poland) Legia Warsaw (4)	(Cyprus) Omonia (5); (Bulgaria) Levski Sofia (6); (Greece) Aris (7); Austria Wien (8)
Group 4		Group 5		Group 6	
Seeded	Unseeded	Seeded	Unseeded	Seeded	Unseeded
(Belgium) Gent (1); (Turkey) Adana Demirspor (2); (Czech Republic) Viktoria Plzeň (3); (Switzerland) Luzern (4); (Portugal) Arouca (5)	(Malta) Gżira United (6); (Poland) Pogoń Szczecin (7); (Croatia) Osijek (8); (Scotland) Hibernian (9); (Norway) Brann (10)	(Belgium) Club Brugge (2); (Turkey) Fenerbahçe (1); (Netherlands) Twente (3); (Croatia) Rijeka (4); (Norway) Rosenborg (5)	(Latvia) Riga (6); (Slovenia) Maribor (7); (Iceland) KA (8); (Scotland) Heart of Midlothian (10); (Faroe Islands) B36 (9)	(Kazakhstan) Tobol (1); (Norway) Bodø/Glimt (2); (Poland) Lech Poznań (3); (Cyprus) APOEL (4); (Romania) FCSB (5)	(Slovakia) Spartak Trnava (6); (Republic of Ireland) Derry City (7); (Armenia) Pyunik (8); (Georgia (country)) Dila Gori (9); (Denmark) Nordsjælland (10)

Notes

1. ^{†} Winners of the main path second qualifying round, whose identity was not known at the time of draw. Teams in italics defeated a team with a higher coefficient, thus effectively taking the coefficient of their opponent in the draw.
2. ^{††} Winners of the champions path second qualifying round, whose identity was not known at the time of draw.

=== Summary ===
The first legs were played on 9 and 10 August, and the second legs were played on 16 and 17 August 2023.

The winners of the ties advanced to the play-off round of their respective path. The losers were eliminated from European competitions for the season.

Team 1	Agg.	Team 2	1st leg	2nd leg
Champions Path
Hamrun Spartans (Malta)	2–8	(Hungary) Ferencváros	1–6	1–2
Farul Constanța (Romania)	5–0	(Estonia) Flora	3–0	2–0
Valmiera (Latvia)	1–3	(Albania) Partizani	1–2	0–1
Ballkani (Kosovo)	5–1	(Gibraltar) Lincoln Red Imps	2–0	3–1
Struga (North Macedonia)	4–3	(Luxembourg) Swift Hesperange	3–1	1–2
Main Path
AEK Larnaca (Cyprus)	1–2	(Israel) Maccabi Tel Aviv	1–1	0–1
Sabah (Azerbaijan)	2–2 (4–5 p)	(Serbia) Partizan	2–0	0–2 (a.e.t.)
Sepsi OSK (Romania)	2–1	(Kazakhstan) Aktobe	1–1	1–0
Rapid Wien (Austria)	5–0	(Hungary) Debrecen	0–0	5–0
Hajduk Split (Croatia)	0–3	(Greece) PAOK	0–0	0–3
FC Santa Coloma (Andorra)	0–3	(Netherlands) AZ	0–1	0–2
Celje (Slovenia)	5–1	(Belarus) Neman Grodno	1–0	4–1
Neftçi (Azerbaijan)	2–5 (Note: Order of legs reversed after original draw.)	(Turkey) Beşiktaş	1–3	1–2
Omonia (Cyprus)	2–5	(Denmark) Midtjylland	1–0	1–5
Aris (Greece)	2–2 (5–6 p)	(Ukraine) Dynamo Kyiv	1–0	1–2 (a.e.t.)
Legia Warsaw (Poland)	6–5	Austria Wien	1–2	5–3
Hapoel Be'er Sheva (Israel)	1–2	(Bulgaria) Levski Sofia	0–0	1–2
Hibernian (Scotland)	5–3	(Switzerland) Luzern	3–1	2–2
Viktoria Plzeň (Czech Republic)	6–0	(Malta) Gżira United	4–0	2–0
Arouca (Portugal)	3–4	(Norway) Brann	2–1	1–3
Gent (Belgium)	6–2	(Poland) Pogoń Szczecin	5–0	1–2
Adana Demirspor (Turkey)	7–4	(Croatia) Osijek	5–1	2–3
B36 (Faroe Islands)	1–5	(Croatia) Rijeka	1–3	0–2
Twente (Netherlands)	5–0	(Latvia) Riga	2–0	3–0
Rosenborg (Norway)	3–4	(Scotland) Heart of Midlothian	2–1	1–3
Fenerbahçe (Turkey)	6–1	(Slovenia) Maribor	3–1	3–0
Club Brugge (Belgium)	10–2	(Iceland) KA	5–1	5–1
Dila Gori (Georgia (country))	0–3	(Cyprus) APOEL	0–2	0–1
Lech Poznań (Poland)	3–4	(Slovakia) Spartak Trnava	2–1	1–3
FCSB (Romania)	0–2	(Denmark) Nordsjælland	0–0	0–2
Tobol (Kazakhstan)	1–1 (6–5 p)	(Republic of Ireland) Derry City	1–0	0–1 (a.e.t.)
Bodø/Glimt (Norway)	6–0	(Armenia) Pyunik	3–0	3–0

== Play-off round ==
The draw for the play-off round was held on 7 August 2023.

=== Seeding ===
A total of 44 teams took part in the play-off round. They were divided into two paths:

- Champions Path (10 teams): The teams, whose identity was not known at the time of the draw, were seeded as follows:
  - Seeded: five losers of the 2023–24 UEFA Europa League third qualifying round (Champions Path).
  - Unseeded: five winners of the third qualifying round (Champions Path).
- Main Path (34 teams): five teams which entered in this round, 27 winners of the third qualifying round (Main Path) and two losers of the 2023–24 UEFA Europa League third qualifying round (Main Path). Seeding of teams were based on their 2023 UEFA club coefficients. For the winners of the third qualifying round and losers of the Europa League third qualifying round, whose identity was not known at the time of the draw, the club coefficient of the highest-ranked remaining team in each tie was used. Teams from the same association could not be drawn against each other.

Prior to the draw, UEFA formed groups of seeded teams and unseeded teams in accordance with the principles set by the Club Competitions Committee. The first team drawn in each tie became the home team of the first leg.

Champions Path
Group 1		Group 2	
Seeded	Unseeded	Seeded	Unseeded
(Lithuania) Žalgiris; (Belarus) BATE Borisov	(Hungary) Ferencváros; (Kosovo) Ballkani	(Iceland) Breiðablik; (Finland) HJK; (Kazakhstan) Astana	(Albania) Partizani; (Romania) Farul Constanța; (North Macedonia) Struga

Main Path
Group 1		Group 2	
Seeded	Unseeded	Seeded	Unseeded
(Germany) Eintracht Frankfurt (1); (Turkey) Fenerbahçe (2); (Denmark) Midtjylland (3); (Norway) Bodø/Glimt (4)	(Bulgaria) Levski Sofia (5); (Netherlands) Twente (6); (Poland) Legia Warsaw (7); (Romania) Sepsi OSK (8)	(Belgium) Gent (1); (Ukraine) Dynamo Kyiv (2); (France) Lille (3); (Czech Republic) Viktoria Plzeň (4)	(Cyprus) APOEL (5); (Turkey) Beşiktaş (6); (Croatia) Rijeka (7); (Kazakhstan) Tobol (8)
Group 3		Group 4	
Seeded	Unseeded	Seeded	Unseeded
(Ukraine) Dnipro-1 (1); (Netherlands) AZ (2); (Belgium) Genk (3); (England) Aston Villa (4)	(Slovakia) Spartak Trnava (5); (Norway) Brann (6); (Turkey) Adana Demirspor (7); (Scotland) Hibernian (8)	(Belgium) Club Brugge (1); (Serbia) Partizan (2); (Greece) PAOK (3); (Israel) Maccabi Tel Aviv (4); (Italy) Fiorentina (5)	(Spain) Osasuna (6); (Austria) Rapid Wien (7); (Denmark) Nordsjælland (8); (Scotland) Heart of Midlothian (9); (Slovenia) Celje (10)

Notes

1. ^{†} Winners of the third qualifying round, whose identity was not known at the time of draw. Teams in italics defeated a team with a higher coefficient, thus effectively taking the coefficient of their opponent in the draw.
2. ^{††} Losers of the UEFA Europa League third qualifying round, whose identity was not known at the time of draw.

=== Summary ===
The first legs were played on 23 and 24 August, and the second legs were played on 31 August 2023.

The winners of the ties advanced to the group stage. The losers were eliminated from European competitions for the season.

In this season, the video assistant referee (VAR) was used from this stage.

Team 1	Agg.	Team 2	1st leg	2nd leg
Champions Path
Ballkani (Kosovo)	4–2	(Belarus) BATE Borisov	4–1	0–1
Žalgiris (Lithuania)	0–7	(Hungary) Ferencváros	0–4	0–3
Struga (North Macedonia)	0–2	(Iceland) Breiðablik	0–1	0–1
Farul Constanța (Romania)	2–3	(Finland) HJK	2–1	0–2
Astana (Kazakhstan)	2–1	(Albania) Partizani	1–0	1–1
Main Path
Levski Sofia (Bulgaria)	1–3	(Germany) Eintracht Frankfurt	1–1	0–2
Gent (Belgium)	4–1 (Note: Order of legs reversed after original draw.)	(Cyprus) APOEL	2–0	2–1
Spartak Trnava (Slovakia)	3–2	(Ukraine) Dnipro-1	1–1	2–1 (a.e.t.)
Sepsi OSK (Romania)	4–5	(Norway) Bodø/Glimt	2–2	2–3 (a.e.t.)
Tobol (Kazakhstan)	1–5	(Czech Republic) Viktoria Plzeň	1–2	0–3
Hibernian (Scotland)	0–8	(England) Aston Villa	0–5	0–3
Midtjylland (Denmark)	4–4 (5–6 p)	(Poland) Legia Warsaw	3–3	1–1 (a.e.t.)
Lille (France)	3–2	(Croatia) Rijeka	2–1	1–1 (a.e.t.)
Genk (Belgium)	2–2 (5–4 p)	(Turkey) Adana Demirspor	2–1	0–1 (a.e.t.)
Fenerbahçe (Turkey)	6–1	(Netherlands) Twente	5–1	1–0
Dynamo Kyiv (Ukraine)	2–4	(Turkey) Beşiktaş	2–3	0–1
AZ (Netherlands)	4–4 (6–5 p)	(Norway) Brann	1–1	3–3 (a.e.t.)
Rapid Wien (Austria)	1–2	(Italy) Fiorentina	1–0	0–2
Heart of Midlothian (Scotland)	1–6	(Greece) PAOK	1–2	0–4
Nordsjælland (Denmark)	6–0	(Serbia) Partizan	5–0	1–0
Osasuna (Spain)	3–4	(Belgium) Club Brugge	1–2	2–2
Maccabi Tel Aviv (Israel)	5–2	(Slovenia) Celje	4–1	1–1
