= 2023–24 UEFA Europa Conference League =

European football tournament

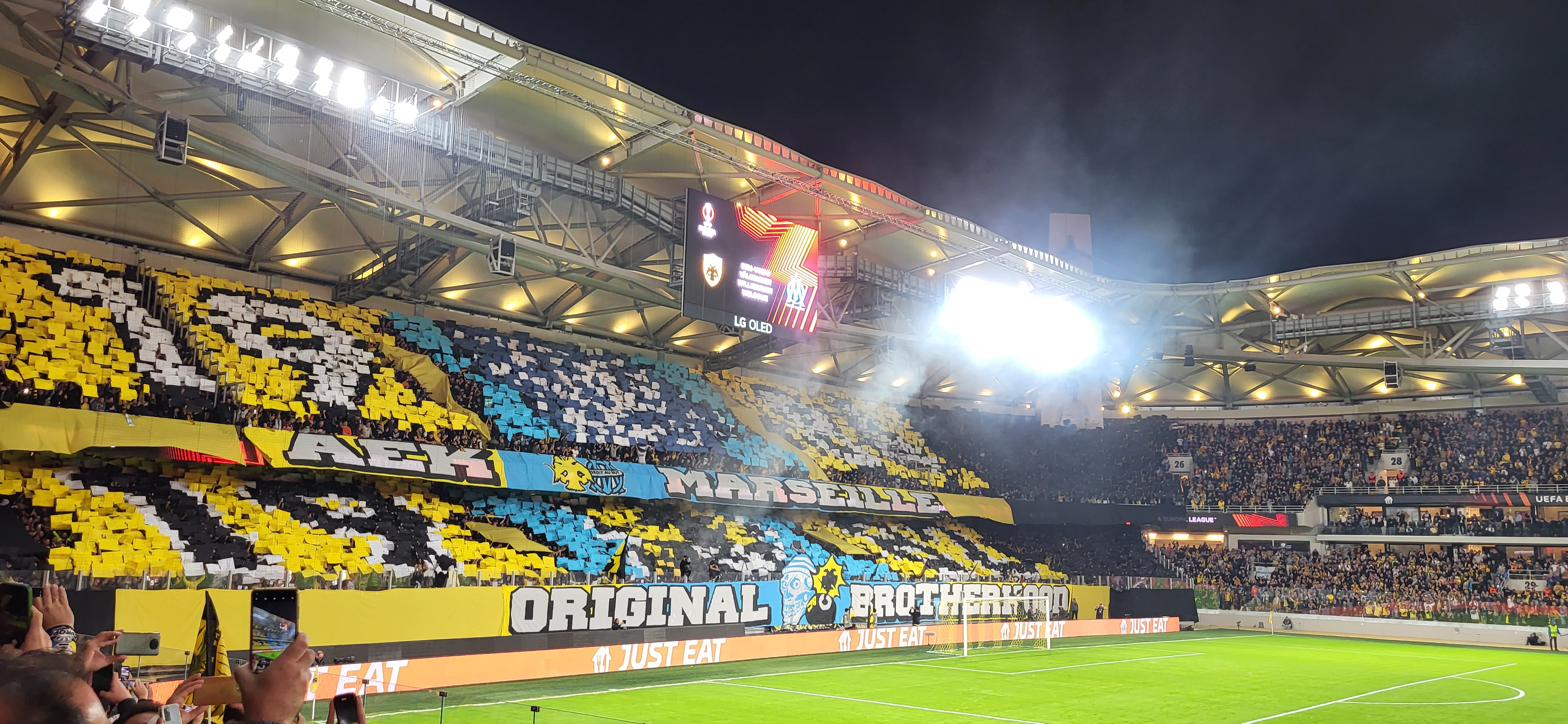
- The Agia Sophia Stadium in Athens hosted the final

Tournament details
- Dates: Qualifying: 12 July – 31 August 2023; Competition proper: 20 September 2023 – 29 May 2024
- Teams: Competition proper: 32+8; Total: 135+43 (from 54 associations)

Final positions
- Champions: (Greece) Olympiacos (1st title)
- Runners-up: (Italy) Fiorentina

Tournament statistics
- Matches played: 141
- Goals scored: 411 (2.91 per match)
- Attendance: 2,327,520 (16,507 per match)
- Top scorer(s): (Morocco) Ayoub El Kaabi (Olympiacos); 11 goals
- Best player: (Morocco) Ayoub El Kaabi (Olympiacos)
- Best young player: (Brazil) Igor Thiago (Club Brugge)

The 2023–24 UEFA Europa Conference League was the third season of the UEFA Europa Conference League, Europe's tertiary club football tournament organised by UEFA.

The final was played at the Agia Sophia Stadium in Athens, Greece. It was won by Olympiacos, who defeated Fiorentina 1–0 after extra time, and qualified for the 2024–25 UEFA Europa League league stage as a result.

This edition was the final season under this name, as it was renamed to the UEFA Conference League from the 2024–25 season onwards. According to UEFA, the new denomination of the competition would enable further development as a stand-alone competition in their research amongst fans and commercial partners. This was also the final season with the format of 32 teams participating in the group stage, after UEFA announced that a brand-new Swiss-system format would be introduced for the following edition. Due to the change, no clubs could be transferred from the Europa League group stage to the Conference League, so starting with this edition the winners would no longer be able to defend their title.

As the title holders, West Ham United qualified for the 2023–24 UEFA Europa League. They were unable to defend their title after advancing to the Europa League knockout phase.

== Association team allocation ==
A total of 178 teams from 54 of the 55 UEFA member associations (excluding Russia) participated in the 2023–24 UEFA Europa Conference League. The association ranking based on the UEFA country coefficients was used to determine the number of participating teams for each association:

- Associations 1–5 each had one team qualify.
- Associations 6–16 (except Russia) and 51–55 each had two teams qualify.
- Associations 17–50 (except Liechtenstein) each had three teams qualify.
- Liechtenstein had only one team that qualified as they organized only a domestic cup and no domestic league.
- Moreover, 18 teams eliminated from the 2023–24 UEFA Champions League and 25 teams eliminated from the 2023–24 UEFA Europa League were transferred to the Europa Conference League.

=== Association ranking ===
For the 2023–24 UEFA Europa Conference League, the associations were allocated places according to their 2022 UEFA country coefficients, which took into account their performance in European competitions from 2017–18 to 2021–22.

Apart from the allocation based on the country coefficients, associations could have additional teams participating in the Europa Conference League, as noted below:

- (UCL) – Additional teams transferred from the UEFA Champions League
- (UEL) – Additional teams transferred from the UEFA Europa League

Association ranking for 2023–24 UEFA Europa Conference League

Rank	Association	Coeff.	Teams	Notes
1	England	106.641	1	
2	Spain	96.141	1	+1 (UEL)
3	Italy	76.902	1	
4	Germany	75.213	1	
5	France	60.081	1	
6	Portugal	53.382	2	
7	Netherlands	49.300	2	+1 (UEL)
8	Austria	38.850	2	+1 (UEL)
9	Scotland	36.900	2	+1 (UEL)
10	Russia	34.482	0	
11	Serbia	33.375	2	+1 (UEL)
12	Ukraine	31.800	2	+2 (UEL)
13	Belgium	30.600	2	+2 (UEL)
14	Switzerland	29.675	2	+2 (UEL)
15	Greece	28.200	2	+1 (UEL)
16	Czech Republic	27.800	2	
17	Norway	27.250	3	+1 (UEL)
18	Denmark	27.175	3	
19	Croatia	27.150	3	+1 (UEL)

Rank	Association	Coeff.	Teams	Notes
20	Turkey	27.100	3	
21	Cyprus	26.375	3	
22	Israel	24.375	3	+1 (UEL)
23	Sweden	22.875	3	
24	Bulgaria	19.500	3	+1 (UEL)
25	Romania	17.150	3	+1 (UCL)
26	Azerbaijan	17.000	3	
27	Hungary	16.375	3	+1 (UCL)
28	Poland	15.875	3	
29	Kazakhstan	15.750	3	+1 (UEL)
30	Slovakia	15.625	3	+1 (UEL)
31	Slovenia	15.000	3	+1 (UEL)
32	Belarus	12.500	3	+1 (UEL)
33	Moldova	11.250	3	
34	Lithuania	10.000	3	+1 (UEL)
35	Bosnia and Herzegovina	9.125	3	+1 (UEL)
36	Finland	8.875	3	+1 (UEL)
37	Luxembourg	8.750	3	+1 (UCL)
38	Latvia	8.625	3	+1 (UCL)

Rank	Association	Coeff.	Teams	Notes
39	Kosovo	8.166	3	+1 (UCL)
40	Republic of Ireland	8.125	3	+1 (UCL)
41	Armenia	8.125	3	+1 (UCL)
42	Northern Ireland	8.083	3	+1 (UCL)
43	Albania	8.000	3	+1 (UCL)
44	Faroe Islands	7.250	3	+1 (UEL)
45	Estonia	7.041	3	+1 (UCL)
46	Malta	7.000	3	+1 (UCL)
47	Georgia	7.000	3	+1 (UCL)
48	North Macedonia	7.000	3	+1 (UCL)
49	Liechtenstein	6.500	1	
50	Wales	5.500	3	+1 (UCL)
51	Gibraltar	5.416	2	+1 (UCL)
52	Iceland	5.375	2	+1 (UEL)
53	Montenegro	4.875	2	+1 (UCL)
54	Andorra	4.665	2	+1 (UCL)
55	San Marino	1.332	2	+1 (UCL)

=== Distribution ===
The following is the access list for this season.

Access list for 2023–24 UEFA Europa Conference League
		Teams entering in this round	Teams advancing from previous round	Teams transferred from Champions League	Teams transferred from Europa League
First qualifying round (62 teams)		16 domestic cup winners from associations 40–55; 25 domestic league runners-up from associations 30–55 (except Liechtenstein); 21 domestic league third-placed teams from associations 29–50 (except Liechtenstein)	—N/a	—N/a	—N/a
Second qualifying round (106 teams)	Champions Path (16 teams)	—N/a	—N/a	13 teams eliminated from Champions League first qualifying round; 3 teams eliminated from Champions League preliminary round	—N/a
Second qualifying round (106 teams)	Main Path (90 teams)	20 domestic cup winners from associations 20–39; 14 domestic league runners-up from associations 16–29; 16 domestic league third-placed teams from associations 13–28; 8 domestic league fourth-placed teams from associations 7–15 (except Russia); 1 domestic league fifth-placed team from association 6	31 winners from the first qualifying round	—N/a	—N/a
Third qualifying round (64 teams)	Champions Path (10 teams)	—N/a	8 winners from the second qualifying round (Champions Path)	2 teams eliminated from Champions League first qualifying round	—N/a
Third qualifying round (64 teams)	Main Path (54 teams)	3 domestic cup winners from associations 17–19; 5 domestic league third-placed teams from associations 7–12 (except Russia); 1 domestic league fourth-placed team from association 6	45 winners from the second qualifying round (Main Path)	—N/a	—N/a
Play-off round (44 teams)	Champions Path (10 teams)	—N/a	5 winners from the third qualifying round (Champions Path)	—N/a	5 teams eliminated from Europa League third qualifying round (Champions Path)
Play-off round (44 teams)	Main Path (34 teams)	1 domestic league fifth-placed team from association 5; 3 domestic league sixth-placed teams from associations 2–4; 1 league cup winner from England	27 winners from the third qualifying round (Main Path)	—N/a	2 teams eliminated from Europa League third qualifying round (Main Path)
Group stage (32 teams)		—N/a	5 winners from the play-off round (Champions Path); 17 winners from the play-off round for (Main Path)	—N/a	10 teams eliminated from Europa League play-off round
Preliminary knockout round (16 teams)		—N/a	8 group runners-up from the group stage	—N/a	8 group third-placed teams from Europa League group stage
Knockout phase (16 teams)		—N/a	8 group winners from the group stage; 8 winners from the preliminary knockout round	—N/a	—N/a

Due to the suspension of Russia for the 2023–24 European season, the following changes to the access list were made:

- The cup winners of association 16 (Czech Republic) entered the Europa League third qualifying round instead of the second qualifying round.
- The cup winners of associations 17 to 19 (Norway, Denmark and Croatia) entered the third qualifying round instead of the second qualifying round.
- The cup winners of associations 30 to 39 (Slovakia, Slovenia, Belarus, Moldova, Lithuania, Bosnia and Herzegovina, Finland, Luxembourg, Latvia and Kosovo) entered the second qualifying round instead of the first qualifying round.

Combining with the Champions League title holder (Manchester City) qualifying for the Champions League group stage via their domestic league, the following changes to the access list were made:

- Two of the Champions League first qualifying round losers received byes and entered the third qualifying round instead of the second qualifying round.

=== Teams ===
The labels in the parentheses show how each team qualified for the place of its starting round:

- CW: Domestic cup winners
- 2nd, 3rd, 4th, 5th, 6th, etc.: League position of the previous season
- LC: League cup winners
- RW: Regular season winners
- PW: End-of-season Europa Conference League play-offs winners
- UCL: Transferred from the Champions League
  - Q1: Losers from the first qualifying round
  - PR: Losers from the preliminary round (F: final; SF: semi-finals)
- UEL: Transferred from the Europa League
  - GS: Third-placed teams from the group stage
  - PO: Losers from the play-off round
  - CH/MP Q3: Losers from the third qualifying round (Champions/Main Path)

The second qualifying round, third qualifying round and play-off round were divided into Champions Path (CH) and Main Path (MP).

Qualified teams for 2023–24 UEFA Europa Conference League
Entry round		Teams			
Knockout round play-offs		(Greece) Olympiacos (UEL GS)	(Netherlands) Ajax (UEL GS)	(Spain) Real Betis (UEL GS)	(Austria) Sturm Graz (UEL GS)
Knockout round play-offs		(Belgium) Union Saint-Gilloise (UEL GS)	(Israel) Maccabi Haifa (UEL GS)	(Switzerland) Servette (UEL GS)	(Norway) Molde (UEL GS)
Group stage		(Scotland) Aberdeen (UEL PO)	(Serbia) Čukarički (UEL PO)	(Ukraine) Zorya Luhansk (UEL PO)	(Switzerland) Lugano (UEL PO)
Group stage		(Croatia) Dinamo Zagreb (UEL PO)	(Bulgaria) Ludogorets Razgrad (UEL PO)	(Slovakia) Slovan Bratislava (UEL PO)	(Slovenia) Olimpija Ljubljana (UEL PO)
Group stage		(Bosnia and Herzegovina) Zrinjski Mostar (UEL PO)	(Faroe Islands) KÍ (UEL PO)		
Play-off round	CH	(Kazakhstan) Astana (UEL CH Q3)	(Belarus) BATE Borisov (UEL CH Q3)	(Lithuania) Žalgiris (UEL CH Q3)	(Finland) HJK (UEL CH Q3)
Play-off round	CH	(Iceland) Breiðablik (UEL CH Q3)			
Play-off round	MP	(England) Aston Villa (7th)	(Spain) Osasuna (7th)	(Italy) Fiorentina (8th)	(Germany) Eintracht Frankfurt (7th)
Play-off round	MP	(France) Lille (5th)	(Ukraine) Dnipro-1 (UEL MP Q3)	(Belgium) Genk (UEL MP Q3)	
Third qualifying round	CH	(Estonia) Flora (UCL Q1)	(Gibraltar) Lincoln Red Imps (UCL Q1)		
Third qualifying round	MP	(Portugal) Arouca (5th)	(Netherlands) AZ (4th)	(Austria) Rapid Wien (4th)	(Scotland) Heart of Midlothian (4th)
Third qualifying round	MP	(Serbia) Partizan (4th)	(Ukraine) Dynamo Kyiv (4th)	(Norway) Brann (CW)	(Denmark) Nordsjælland (2nd)
Third qualifying round	MP	(Croatia) Hajduk Split (CW)			
Second qualifying round	CH	(Romania) Farul Constanța (UCL Q1)	(Hungary) Ferencváros (UCL Q1)	(Luxembourg) Swift Hesperange (UCL Q1)	(Latvia) Valmiera (UCL Q1)
Second qualifying round	CH	(Kosovo) Ballkani (UCL Q1)	(Republic of Ireland) Shamrock Rovers (UCL Q1)	(Armenia) Urartu (UCL Q1)	(Northern Ireland) Larne (UCL Q1)
Second qualifying round	CH	(Albania) Partizani (UCL Q1)	(Malta) Hamrun Spartans (UCL Q1)	(Georgia (country)) Dinamo Tbilisi (UCL Q1)	(North Macedonia) Struga (UCL Q1)
Second qualifying round	CH	(Wales) The New Saints (UCL Q1)	(Montenegro) Budućnost Podgorica (UCL PR F)	(Andorra) Atlètic Club d'Escaldes (UCL PR SF)	(San Marino) Tre Penne (UCL PR SF)
Second qualifying round	MP	(Portugal) Vitória de Guimarães (6th)	(Netherlands) Twente (PW)	Austria Wien (PW)	(Scotland) Hibernian (5th)
Second qualifying round	MP	(Serbia) Vojvodina (5th)	(Ukraine) Vorskla Poltava (5th)	(Belgium) Club Brugge (4th)	(Belgium) Gent (5th)
Second qualifying round	MP	(Switzerland) Luzern (4th)	(Switzerland) Basel (5th)	(Greece) PAOK (4th)	(Greece) Aris (5th)
Second qualifying round	MP	(Czech Republic) Viktoria Plzeň (3rd)	(Czech Republic) Bohemians 1905 (4th)	(Norway) Bodø/Glimt (2nd)	(Norway) Rosenborg (3rd)
Second qualifying round	MP	(Denmark) AGF (3rd)	(Denmark) Midtjylland (PW)	(Croatia) Osijek (3rd)	(Croatia) Rijeka (4th)
Second qualifying round	MP	(Turkey) Fenerbahçe (CW)	(Turkey) Beşiktaş (3rd)	(Turkey) Adana Demirspor (4th)	(Cyprus) Omonia (CW)
Second qualifying round	MP	(Cyprus) APOEL (2nd)	(Cyprus) AEK Larnaca (3rd)	(Israel) Beitar Jerusalem (CW)	(Israel) Hapoel Be'er Sheva (2nd)
Second qualifying round	MP	(Israel) Maccabi Tel Aviv (3rd)	(Sweden) Djurgårdens IF (2nd)	(Sweden) Hammarby IF (3rd)	(Sweden) Kalmar FF (4th)
Second qualifying round	MP	(Bulgaria) CSKA Sofia (2nd)	(Bulgaria) CSKA 1948 (3rd)	(Bulgaria) Levski Sofia (PW)	(Romania) Sepsi OSK (CW)
Second qualifying round	MP	(Romania) FCSB (2nd)	(Romania) CFR Cluj (PW)	(Azerbaijan) Gabala (CW)	(Azerbaijan) Sabah (2nd)
Second qualifying round	MP	(Azerbaijan) Neftçi (3rd)	(Hungary) Zalaegerszeg (CW)	(Hungary) Kecskemét (2nd)	(Hungary) Debrecen (3rd)
Second qualifying round	MP	(Poland) Legia Warsaw (CW)	(Poland) Lech Poznań (3rd)	(Poland) Pogoń Szczecin (4th)	(Kazakhstan) Ordabasy (CW)
Second qualifying round	MP	(Kazakhstan) Aktobe (2nd)	(Slovakia) Spartak Trnava (CW)	(Slovenia) Celje (2nd)	(Belarus) Torpedo-BelAZ Zhodino (CW)
Second qualifying round	MP	(Moldova) Petrocub Hîncești (2nd)	(Lithuania) Kauno Žalgiris (2nd)	(Bosnia and Herzegovina) Borac Banja Luka (2nd)	(Finland) KuPS (CW)
Second qualifying round	MP	(Luxembourg) Differdange 03 (CW)	(Latvia) Auda (CW)	(Kosovo) Drita (2nd)	
First qualifying round		(Kazakhstan) Tobol (3rd)	(Slovakia) DAC Dunajská Streda (2nd)	(Slovakia) Žilina (PW)	(Slovenia) Maribor (3rd)
First qualifying round		(Slovenia) Domžale (4th)	(Belarus) Dinamo Minsk (4th)	(Belarus) Neman Grodno (9th)	(Moldova) Zimbru Chișinău (3rd)
First qualifying round		(Moldova) Milsami Orhei (4th)	(Lithuania) Panevėžys (3rd)	(Lithuania) Hegelmann (4th)	(Bosnia and Herzegovina) Željezničar (3rd)
First qualifying round		(Bosnia and Herzegovina) Sarajevo (4th)	(Finland) Honka (3rd)	(Finland) Haka (4th)	(Luxembourg) Progrès Niederkorn (2nd)
First qualifying round		(Luxembourg) F91 Dudelange (3rd)	(Latvia) Riga (2nd)	(Latvia) RFS (3rd)	(Kosovo) Gjilani (3rd)
First qualifying round		(Kosovo) Dukagjini (4th)	(Republic of Ireland) Derry City (CW)	(Republic of Ireland) Dundalk (3rd)	(Republic of Ireland) St Patrick's Athletic (4th)
First qualifying round		(Armenia) Pyunik (2nd)	Ararat-Armenia (3rd)	(Armenia) Alashkert (4th)	(Northern Ireland) Crusaders (CW)
First qualifying round		(Northern Ireland) Linfield (2nd)	(Northern Ireland) Glentoran (PW)	(Albania) Egnatia (CW)	(Albania) Tirana (2nd)
First qualifying round		(Albania) Vllaznia (4th)	(Faroe Islands) Víkingur Gøta (2nd)	(Faroe Islands) HB (3rd)	(Faroe Islands) B36 (4th)
First qualifying round		(Estonia) Narva Trans (CW)	(Estonia) FCI Levadia (2nd)	(Estonia) Paide Linnameeskond (3rd)	(Malta) Birkirkara (CW)
First qualifying round		(Malta) Gżira United (3rd)	(Malta) Balzan (4th)	(Georgia (country)) Torpedo Kutaisi (CW)	(Georgia (country)) Dinamo Batumi (2nd)
First qualifying round		(Georgia (country)) Dila Gori (3rd)	(North Macedonia) Makedonija GP (CW)	(North Macedonia) Shkupi (2nd)	(North Macedonia) Shkëndija (3rd)
First qualifying round		(Liechtenstein) Vaduz (CW)	(Wales) Connah's Quay Nomads (2nd)	(Wales) Penybont (3rd)	(Wales) Haverfordwest County (PW)
First qualifying round		(Gibraltar) FCB Magpies (CW)	(Gibraltar) Europa (2nd)	(Iceland) Víkingur Reykjavík (CW)	(Iceland) KA (2nd)
First qualifying round		(Montenegro) Sutjeska (CW)	(Montenegro) Arsenal Tivat (3rd)	(Andorra) Inter Club d'Escaldes (CW)	(Andorra) FC Santa Coloma (3rd)
First qualifying round		(San Marino) Cosmos (PW)	(San Marino) La Fiorita (3rd)		

One team not playing in a national top division took part in the competition: Vaduz (2nd tier).

Notes

1. Champions League (UCL Q1): Two of the Champions League first qualifying round losers were drawn to receive byes to the third qualifying round (Champions Path), as two fewer losers were transferred to the second qualifying round (Champions Path), due to Champions League group stage berths vacated following the UCL title holders qualifying via league position and the suspension of Russia from the 2023–24 European season.
2. Belarus (BLR): The winners (Shakhtyor Soligorsk) and runners-up (Energetik-BGU Minsk) of the 2022 Belarusian Premier League were both found guilty of match-fixing by the Football Federation of Belarus and were denied UEFA licences. Fifth-placed Isloch Minsk Raion were also denied a UEFA licence due to their involvement in another match-fixing scandal. The sixth- and seventh-placed teams, Minsk and Gomel did not apply for UEFA licences. As eighth-placed Torpedo-BelAZ Zhodino had already qualified for the second qualifying round as cup winners, the Europa Conference League berth reserved for the usual third-placed team was passed down to the highest-placed team who were granted a UEFA licence, Neman Grodno, who finished ninth.
3. Italy (ITA): Due to a violation of UEFA's financial regulations, the seventh-placed Juventus were excluded from UEFA men's club competitions. Subsequently, Fiorentina, the eighth-placed team, took its place in the Europa Conference League.
4. Kosovo (KOS): Prishtina would have qualified for the Europa Conference League second qualifying round as the winners of the 2022–23 Kosovar Cup, but failed to obtain a UEFA licence. As a result, the berth reserved for the second qualifying round was given to the runner-up of the 2022–23 Football Superleague of Kosovo, Drita, who originally entered the first qualifying round, and the berth reserved for the first qualifying round was given to the fourth-placed team, Dukagjini.
5. Liechtenstein (LIE): The seven teams affiliated with the Liechtenstein Football Association (LFV) all played in the Swiss football league system. The only competition organised by the LFV was the Liechtenstein Football Cup – the winners of which qualified for the UEFA Europa Conference League.
6. Russia (RUS): On 28 February 2022, Russian football clubs and national teams were suspended from FIFA and UEFA competitions due to the Russian invasion of Ukraine. The tables reflected Russia's ongoing suspension from UEFA competitions.
7. San Marino (SMR): Cup winners Virtus were found guilty of match-fixing and denied a UEFA licence. The third-placed team of the league, La Fiorita, were selected as their replacement by the San Marino Football Federation.
8. Ukraine (UKR): The 2022–23 Ukrainian Cup was abandoned due to the ongoing Russian invasion of Ukraine. The berths reserved for the third and fourth-placed teams in the league were transferred to the fourth and fifth-placed teams in the league respectively.

== Schedule ==
The schedule of the competition was as follows. Matches were scheduled for Thursdays apart from the final, which took place on a Wednesday, though exceptionally could take place on Tuesdays or Wednesdays due to scheduling conflicts.

Schedule for 2023–24 UEFA Europa Conference League
Phase	Round	Draw date	First leg	Second leg
Qualifying	First qualifying round	20 June 2023	13 July 2023	20 July 2023
Qualifying	Second qualifying round	21 June 2023	27 July 2023	3 August 2023
Qualifying	Third qualifying round	24 July 2023	10 August 2023	17 August 2023
Play-offs	Play-off round	7 August 2023	24 August 2023	31 August 2023
Group stage	Matchday 1	1 September 2023	21 September 2023	
Group stage	Matchday 2	1 September 2023	5 October 2023	
Group stage	Matchday 3	1 September 2023	26 October 2023	
Group stage	Matchday 4	1 September 2023	9 November 2023	
Group stage	Matchday 5	1 September 2023	30 November 2023	
Group stage	Matchday 6	1 September 2023	14 December 2023	
Knockout phase	Knockout round play-offs	18 December 2023	15 February 2024	22 February 2024
Knockout phase	Round of 16	23 February 2024	7 March 2024	14 March 2024
Knockout phase	Quarter-finals	15 March 2024	11 April 2024	18 April 2024
Knockout phase	Semi-finals	15 March 2024	2 May 2024	9 May 2024
Knockout phase	Final	15 March 2024	29 May 2024 at Agia Sophia Stadium, Athens	

== Qualifying rounds ==
=== First qualifying round ===
The draw for the first qualifying round was held on 20 June 2023. The first legs were played on 12 and 13 July, and the second legs were played on 18 and 20 July 2023.

The winners of the ties advanced to the Main Path second qualifying round. The losers were eliminated from European competitions for the season.

Team 1	Agg.	Team 2	1st leg	2nd leg
Sutjeska (Montenegro)	2–1	(San Marino) Cosmos	1–0	1–1
Domžale (Slovenia)	4–5 (Note: Order of legs reversed after original draw.)	(Malta) Balzan	1–4	3–1 (a.e.t.)
Vaduz (Liechtenstein)	2–3	(Belarus) Neman Grodno	1–2	1–1
Ararat-Armenia	5–5 (4–2 p)	(Albania) Egnatia	1–1	4–4 (a.e.t.)
Torpedo Kutaisi (Georgia (country))	3–3 (4–2 p)	(Bosnia and Herzegovina) Sarajevo	2–2	1–1 (a.e.t.)
Alashkert (Armenia)	7–2	(Montenegro) Arsenal Tivat	1–1	6–1
Željezničar (Bosnia and Herzegovina)	4–3	(Belarus) Dinamo Minsk	2–2	2–1
La Fiorita (San Marino)	1–2	(Moldova) Zimbru Chișinău	1–1	0–1
Maribor (Slovenia)	3–2	(Malta) Birkirkara	1–1	2–1
Tirana (Albania)	3–2	(Georgia (country)) Dinamo Batumi	1–1	2–1
FCB Magpies (Gibraltar)	1–3	(Republic of Ireland) Dundalk	0–0	1–3
Inter Club d'Escaldes (Andorra)	3–2	(Faroe Islands) Víkingur Gøta	2–1	1–1
Progrès Niederkorn (Luxembourg)	4–2	(Kosovo) Gjilani	2–2	2–0
Linfield (Northern Ireland)	3–2	(Albania) Vllaznia	3–1	0–1
KA (Iceland)	4–0	(Wales) Connah's Quay Nomads	2–0	2–0
Shkëndija (North Macedonia)	1–1 (2–3 p)	(Wales) Haverfordwest County	1–0	0–1 (a.e.t.)
Haka (Finland)	2–3	(Northern Ireland) Crusaders	2–2	0–1
HB (Faroe Islands)	0–1	(Republic of Ireland) Derry City	0–0	0–1
Riga (Latvia)	2–1	(Iceland) Víkingur Reykjavík	2–0	0–1
Žilina (Slovakia)	4–2	(Estonia) FCI Levadia	2–1	2–1
Pyunik (Armenia)	5–0	(Estonia) Narva Trans	2–0	3–0
Panevėžys (Lithuania)	3–2	(Moldova) Milsami Orhei	2–2	1–0
Tobol (Kazakhstan)	2–1	(Finland) Honka	2–1	0–0
DAC Dunajská Streda (Slovakia)	2–3	(Georgia (country)) Dila Gori	2–1	0–2
Makedonija GP (North Macedonia)	1–5	(Latvia) RFS	0–1	1–4
Dukagjini (Kosovo)	5–3	(Gibraltar) Europa	2–1	3–2
Penybont (Wales)	1–3	(Andorra) FC Santa Coloma	1–1	0–2 (a.e.t.)
Hegelmann (Lithuania)	0–5	(North Macedonia) Shkupi	0–5	0–0
F91 Dudelange (Luxembourg)	5–3	(Republic of Ireland) St Patrick's Athletic	2–1	3–2
B36 (Faroe Islands)	2–0	(Estonia) Paide Linnameeskond	0–0	2–0 (a.e.t.)
Gżira United (Malta)	3–3 (14–13 p)	(Northern Ireland) Glentoran	2–2	1–1 (a.e.t.)

=== Second qualifying round ===
The draw for the second qualifying round was made on 21 June 2023. The first legs were played on 25, 26 and 27 July, and the second legs were played on 1, 2 and 3 August 2023.

The winners of the ties advanced to the third qualifying round of their respective path. The losers were eliminated from European competitions for the season.

Team 1	Agg.	Team 2	1st leg	2nd leg
Champions Path
Lincoln Red Imps (Gibraltar)	Bye	N/A	—	—
Flora (Estonia)	Bye	N/A	—	—
Tre Penne (San Marino)	0–10	(Latvia) Valmiera	0–3	0–7
Ferencváros (Hungary)	6–0	(Republic of Ireland) Shamrock Rovers	4–0	2–0
The New Saints (Wales)	3–4	(Luxembourg) Swift Hesperange	1–1	2–3
Atlètic Club d'Escaldes (Andorra)	1–5	(Albania) Partizani	0–1	1–4
Hamrun Spartans (Malta)	3–1	(Georgia (country)) Dinamo Tbilisi	2–1	1–0
Farul Constanța (Romania)	6–4	(Armenia) Urartu	3–2	3–2
Struga (North Macedonia)	5–3	(Montenegro) Budućnost Podgorica	1–0	4–3
Ballkani (Kosovo)	7–1	(Northern Ireland) Larne	3–0	4–1
Main Path
Dukagjini (Kosovo)	1–7 (Note: Order of legs reversed after original draw.)	(Croatia) Rijeka	0–1	1–6
Gżira United (Malta)	3–2	(Luxembourg) F91 Dudelange	2–0	1–2
Djurgårdens IF (Sweden)	2–3	(Switzerland) Luzern	1–2	1–1
Celje (Slovenia)	4–4 (4–2 p)	(Portugal) Vitória de Guimarães	3–4	1–0 (a.e.t.)
Sutjeska (Montenegro)	2–3	(Andorra) FC Santa Coloma	2–0	0–3 (a.e.t.)
Hapoel Be'er Sheva (Israel)	2–1	(Lithuania) Panevėžys	1–0	1–1
Vorskla Poltava (Ukraine)	3–4	(Georgia (country)) Dila Gori	2–1	1–3
CFR Cluj (Romania)	2–3	(Turkey) Adana Demirspor	1–1	1–2
Ordabasy (Kazakhstan)	4–5	(Poland) Legia Warsaw	2–2	2–3
RFS (Latvia)	1–4	(Azerbaijan) Sabah	0–2	1–2
Beşiktaş (Turkey)	5–1	(Albania) Tirana	3–1	2–0
Željezničar (Bosnia and Herzegovina)	2–4	(Azerbaijan) Neftçi	2–2	0–2
APOEL (Cyprus)	4–2	(Serbia) Vojvodina	2–1	2–1
CSKA 1948 (Bulgaria)	2–4	(Romania) FCSB	0–1	2–3
Alashkert (Armenia)	2–2 (1–3 p)	(Hungary) Debrecen	0–1	2–1 (a.e.t.)
Lech Poznań (Poland)	5–2	(Lithuania) Kauno Žalgiris	3–1	2–1
Kalmar FF (Sweden)	2–4	(Armenia) Pyunik	1–2	1–2
Bodø/Glimt (Norway)	7–2	(Czech Republic) Bohemians 1905	3–0	4–2
Auda (Latvia)	2–5	(Slovakia) Spartak Trnava	1–1	1–4
Osijek (Croatia)	3–1	(Hungary) Zalaegerszeg	1–0	2–1
Twente (Netherlands)	2–1	(Sweden) Hammarby IF	1–0	1–1 (a.e.t.)
KA (Iceland)	5–3	(Republic of Ireland) Dundalk	3–1	2–2
Club Brugge (Belgium)	3–1	(Denmark) AGF	3–0	0–1
Crusaders (Northern Ireland)	4–5	(Norway) Rosenborg	2–2	2–3 (a.e.t.)
Inter Club d'Escaldes (Andorra)	3–7	(Scotland) Hibernian	2–1	1–6
Viktoria Plzeň (Czech Republic)	2–1	(Kosovo) Drita	0–0	2–1
B36 (Faroe Islands)	3–2	(Wales) Haverfordwest County	2–1	1–1 (a.e.t.)
Basel (Switzerland)	3–4	(Kazakhstan) Tobol	1–3	2–1
Differdange 03 (Luxembourg)	4–5	(Slovenia) Maribor	1–1	3–4 (a.e.t.)
Austria Wien	3–1	(Bosnia and Herzegovina) Borac Banja Luka	1–0	2–1
CSKA Sofia (Bulgaria)	0–6	(Romania) Sepsi OSK	0–2	0–4
Ararat-Armenia	1–2	(Greece) Aris	1–1	0–1
Maccabi Tel Aviv (Israel)	5–0	(Moldova) Petrocub Hîncești	3–0	2–0
Torpedo-BelAZ Zhodino (Belarus)	3–4	(Cyprus) AEK Larnaca	2–3	1–1
Torpedo Kutaisi (Georgia (country))	3–5	(Kazakhstan) Aktobe	1–4	2–1
Midtjylland (Denmark)	3–2	(Luxembourg) Progrès Niederkorn	2–0	1–2 (a.e.t.)
Derry City (Republic of Ireland)	5–4	(Finland) KuPS	2–1	3–3
Gent (Belgium)	10–3	(Slovakia) Žilina	5–1	5–2
Kecskemét (Hungary)	3–4	(Latvia) Riga	2–1	1–3 (a.e.t.)
Linfield (Northern Ireland)	4–8	(Poland) Pogoń Szczecin	2–5	2–3
PAOK (Greece)	4–1	(Israel) Beitar Jerusalem	0–0	4–1
Neman Grodno (Belarus)	2–0	(Malta) Balzan	2–0	0–0
Fenerbahçe (Turkey)	9–0	(Moldova) Zimbru Chișinău	5–0	4–0
Gabala (Azerbaijan)	3–7	(Cyprus) Omonia	2–3	1–4
Shkupi (North Macedonia)	0–3	(Bulgaria) Levski Sofia	0–2	0–1

=== Third qualifying round ===
The draw for the third qualifying round was held on 24 July 2023. The first legs were played on 9 and 10 August, and the second legs were played on 16 and 17 August 2023.

The winners of the ties advanced to the play-off round of their respective path. The losers were eliminated from European competitions for the season.

Team 1	Agg.	Team 2	1st leg	2nd leg
Champions Path
Hamrun Spartans (Malta)	2–8	(Hungary) Ferencváros	1–6	1–2
Farul Constanța (Romania)	5–0	(Estonia) Flora	3–0	2–0
Valmiera (Latvia)	1–3	(Albania) Partizani	1–2	0–1
Ballkani (Kosovo)	5–1	(Gibraltar) Lincoln Red Imps	2–0	3–1
Struga (North Macedonia)	4–3	(Luxembourg) Swift Hesperange	3–1	1–2
Main Path
AEK Larnaca (Cyprus)	1–2	(Israel) Maccabi Tel Aviv	1–1	0–1
Sabah (Azerbaijan)	2–2 (4–5 p)	(Serbia) Partizan	2–0	0–2 (a.e.t.)
Sepsi OSK (Romania)	2–1	(Kazakhstan) Aktobe	1–1	1–0
Rapid Wien (Austria)	5–0	(Hungary) Debrecen	0–0	5–0
Hajduk Split (Croatia)	0–3	(Greece) PAOK	0–0	0–3
FC Santa Coloma (Andorra)	0–3	(Netherlands) AZ	0–1	0–2
Celje (Slovenia)	5–1	(Belarus) Neman Grodno	1–0	4–1
Neftçi (Azerbaijan)	2–5 (Note: Order of legs reversed after original draw.)	(Turkey) Beşiktaş	1–3	1–2
Omonia (Cyprus)	2–5	(Denmark) Midtjylland	1–0	1–5
Aris (Greece)	2–2 (5–6 p)	(Ukraine) Dynamo Kyiv	1–0	1–2 (a.e.t.)
Legia Warsaw (Poland)	6–5	Austria Wien	1–2	5–3
Hapoel Be'er Sheva (Israel)	1–2	(Bulgaria) Levski Sofia	0–0	1–2
Hibernian (Scotland)	5–3	(Switzerland) Luzern	3–1	2–2
Viktoria Plzeň (Czech Republic)	6–0	(Malta) Gżira United	4–0	2–0
Arouca (Portugal)	3–4	(Norway) Brann	2–1	1–3
Gent (Belgium)	6–2	(Poland) Pogoń Szczecin	5–0	1–2
Adana Demirspor (Turkey)	7–4	(Croatia) Osijek	5–1	2–3
B36 (Faroe Islands)	1–5	(Croatia) Rijeka	1–3	0–2
Twente (Netherlands)	5–0	(Latvia) Riga	2–0	3–0
Rosenborg (Norway)	3–4	(Scotland) Heart of Midlothian	2–1	1–3
Fenerbahçe (Turkey)	6–1	(Slovenia) Maribor	3–1	3–0
Club Brugge (Belgium)	10–2	(Iceland) KA	5–1	5–1
Dila Gori (Georgia (country))	0–3	(Cyprus) APOEL	0–2	0–1
Lech Poznań (Poland)	3–4	(Slovakia) Spartak Trnava	2–1	1–3
FCSB (Romania)	0–2	(Denmark) Nordsjælland	0–0	0–2
Tobol (Kazakhstan)	1–1 (6–5 p)	(Republic of Ireland) Derry City	1–0	0–1 (a.e.t.)
Bodø/Glimt (Norway)	6–0	(Armenia) Pyunik	3–0	3–0

== Play-off round ==
The draw for the play-off round was held on 7 August 2023. The first legs were played on 23 and 24 August, and the second legs were played on 31 August 2023.

The winners of the ties advanced to the group stage. The losers were eliminated from European competitions for the season.

In this season, the video assistant referee (VAR) was used from this stage.

Team 1	Agg.	Team 2	1st leg	2nd leg
Champions Path
Ballkani (Kosovo)	4–2	(Belarus) BATE Borisov	4–1	0–1
Žalgiris (Lithuania)	0–7	(Hungary) Ferencváros	0–4	0–3
Struga (North Macedonia)	0–2	(Iceland) Breiðablik	0–1	0–1
Farul Constanța (Romania)	2–3	(Finland) HJK	2–1	0–2
Astana (Kazakhstan)	2–1	(Albania) Partizani	1–0	1–1
Main Path
Levski Sofia (Bulgaria)	1–3	(Germany) Eintracht Frankfurt	1–1	0–2
Gent (Belgium)	4–1 (Note: Order of legs reversed after original draw.)	(Cyprus) APOEL	2–0	2–1
Spartak Trnava (Slovakia)	3–2	(Ukraine) Dnipro-1	1–1	2–1 (a.e.t.)
Sepsi OSK (Romania)	4–5	(Norway) Bodø/Glimt	2–2	2–3 (a.e.t.)
Tobol (Kazakhstan)	1–5	(Czech Republic) Viktoria Plzeň	1–2	0–3
Hibernian (Scotland)	0–8	(England) Aston Villa	0–5	0–3
Midtjylland (Denmark)	4–4 (5–6 p)	(Poland) Legia Warsaw	3–3	1–1 (a.e.t.)
Lille (France)	3–2	(Croatia) Rijeka	2–1	1–1 (a.e.t.)
Genk (Belgium)	2–2 (5–4 p)	(Turkey) Adana Demirspor	2–1	0–1 (a.e.t.)
Fenerbahçe (Turkey)	6–1	(Netherlands) Twente	5–1	1–0
Dynamo Kyiv (Ukraine)	2–4	(Turkey) Beşiktaş	2–3	0–1
AZ (Netherlands)	4–4 (6–5 p)	(Norway) Brann	1–1	3–3 (a.e.t.)
Rapid Wien (Austria)	1–2	(Italy) Fiorentina	1–0	0–2
Heart of Midlothian (Scotland)	1–6	(Greece) PAOK	1–2	0–4
Nordsjælland (Denmark)	6–0	(Serbia) Partizan	5–0	1–0
Osasuna (Spain)	3–4	(Belgium) Club Brugge	1–2	2–2
Maccabi Tel Aviv (Israel)	5–2	(Slovenia) Celje	4–1	1–1

== Group stage ==
Location of teams of the 2023–24 UEFA Europa Conference League group stage
Brown: Group A; Red: Group B; Orange: Group C; Yellow: Group D;
Green: Group E; Blue: Group F; Purple: Group G; Pink: Group H.
Location of Benelux and nearby team of the 2023–24 UEFA Europa Conference League group stage.
Red: Group B; Yellow: Group D;
Green: Group E; Blue: Group F.

The draw for the group stage was held on 1 September 2023, 14:30 CEST, in Monaco. The 32 teams were drawn into eight groups of four. For the draw, the teams were seeded into four pots, each of eight teams, based on their club coefficients. Teams from the same association could not be drawn into the same group.

All teams besides AZ, Ballkani, Bodø/Glimt, Fiorentina, Gent, HJK, Maccabi Tel Aviv, PAOK, Slovan Bratislava and Zorya Luhansk made their debut appearances in the group stage. Breiðablik, Čukarički, KÍ, Olimpija Ljubljana and Zrinjski Mostar all made their debut appearances in a UEFA competition group stage. Breiðablik, KÍ and Zrinjski Mostar were the first teams from Iceland, the Faroe Islands and Bosnia and Herzegovina, respectively, to play in a UEFA competition group stage. Breiðablik also became the first ever team to qualify for the group stages of a UEFA club competition after starting in a preliminary round.

A total of 28 national associations were represented in the group stage.

=== Group A ===
Pos	Team	Pld	W	D	L	GF	GA	GD	Pts	Qualification	LOSC	SLO	LJU	KÍ
1	(France) Lille	6	4	2	0	10	2	+8	14	Advance to round of 16	—	2–1	2–0	3–0
2	(Slovakia) Slovan Bratislava	6	3	1	2	8	7	+1	10	Advance to knockout round play-offs	1–1	—	1–2	2–1
3	(Slovenia) Olimpija Ljubljana	6	2	0	4	4	9	−5	6		0–2	0–1	—	2–0
4	(Faroe Islands) KÍ	6	1	1	4	5	9	−4	4		0–0	1–2	3–0	—

Source: UEFA

=== Group B ===
Pos	Team	Pld	W	D	L	GF	GA	GD	Pts	Qualification	MTA	GNT	ZOR	BRE
1	(Israel) Maccabi Tel Aviv	6	5	0	1	14	9	+5	15	Advance to round of 16	—	3–1	3–2	3–2
2	(Belgium) Gent	6	4	1	1	16	7	+9	13	Advance to knockout round play-offs	2–0	—	4–1	5–0
3	(Ukraine) Zorya Luhansk	6	2	1	3	10	11	−1	7		1–3	1–1	—	4–0
4	(Iceland) Breiðablik	6	0	0	6	5	18	−13	0		1–2	2–3	0–1	—

Source: UEFA

=== Group C ===
Pos	Team	Pld	W	D	L	GF	GA	GD	Pts	Qualification	PLZ	DZG	AST	BAL
1	(Czech Republic) Viktoria Plzeň	6	6	0	0	9	1	+8	18	Advance to round of 16	—	1–0	3–0	1–0
2	(Croatia) Dinamo Zagreb	6	3	0	3	10	5	+5	9	Advance to knockout round play-offs	0–1	—	5–1	3–0
3	(Kazakhstan) Astana	6	1	1	4	4	13	−9	4 (Note: Ranked on head-to-head points: Astana 4, Ballkani 1.)		1–2	0–2	—	0–0
4	(Kosovo) Ballkani	6	1	1	4	3	7	−4	4		0–1	2–0	1–2	—

Source: UEFA

=== Group D ===
Pos	Team	Pld	W	D	L	GF	GA	GD	Pts	Qualification	BRU	BOD	BEŞ	LUG
1	(Belgium) Club Brugge	6	5	1	0	15	3	+12	16	Advance to round of 16	—	3–1	1–1	2–0
2	(Norway) Bodø/Glimt	6	3	1	2	11	8	+3	10	Advance to knockout round play-offs	0–1	—	3–1	5–2
3	(Turkey) Beşiktaş	6	1	1	4	7	14	−7	4 (Note: Ranked on head-to-head goal difference: Beşiktaş +1, Lugano –1.)		0–5	1–2	—	2–3
4	(Switzerland) Lugano	6	1	1	4	6	14	−8	4		1–3	0–0	0–2	—

Source: UEFA

=== Group E ===
Pos	Team	Pld	W	D	L	GF	GA	GD	Pts	Qualification	AVL	LEG	AZ	ZRI
1	(England) Aston Villa	6	4	1	1	12	7	+5	13	Advance to round of 16	—	2–1	2–1	1–0
2	(Poland) Legia Warsaw	6	4	0	2	10	6	+4	12	Advance to knockout round play-offs	3–2	—	2–0	2–0
3	(Netherlands) AZ	6	2	0	4	7	12	−5	6		1–4	1–0	—	1–0
4	(Bosnia and Herzegovina) Zrinjski Mostar	6	1	1	4	6	10	−4	4		1–1	1–2	4–3	—

Source: UEFA

=== Group F ===
Pos	Team	Pld	W	D	L	GF	GA	GD	Pts	Qualification	FIO	FER	GNK	ČUK
1	(Italy) Fiorentina	6	3	3	0	14	6	+8	12	Advance to round of 16	—	2–2	2–1	6–0
2	(Hungary) Ferencváros	6	2	4	0	9	6	+3	10	Advance to knockout round play-offs	1–1	—	1–1	3–1
3	(Belgium) Genk	6	2	3	1	8	5	+3	9		2–2	0–0	—	2–0
4	(Serbia) Čukarički	6	0	0	6	2	16	−14	0		0–1	1–2	0–2	—

Source: UEFA

=== Group G ===
Pos	Team	Pld	W	D	L	GF	GA	GD	Pts	Qualification	PAOK	FRA	ABE	HJK
1	(Greece) PAOK	6	5	1	0	16	10	+6	16	Advance to round of 16	—	2–1	2–2	4–2
2	(Germany) Eintracht Frankfurt	6	3	0	3	11	7	+4	9	Advance to knockout round play-offs	1–2	—	2–1	6–0
3	(Scotland) Aberdeen	6	1	3	2	10	10	0	6		2–3	2–0	—	1–1
4	(Finland) HJK	6	0	2	4	7	17	−10	2		2–3	0–1	2–2	—

Source: UEFA

=== Group H ===
Pos	Team	Pld	W	D	L	GF	GA	GD	Pts	Qualification	FEN	LUD	NOR	TRN
1	(Turkey) Fenerbahçe	6	4	0	2	13	11	+2	12 (Note: Tied on head-to-head results. Overall goal difference used as a tiebreaker.)	Advance to round of 16	—	3–1	3–1	4–0
2	(Bulgaria) Ludogorets Razgrad	6	4	0	2	11	11	0	12	Advance to knockout round play-offs	2–0	—	1–0	4–0
3	(Denmark) Nordsjælland	6	3	1	2	17	7	+10	10		6–1	7–1	—	1–1
4	(Slovakia) Spartak Trnava	6	0	1	5	3	15	−12	1		1–2	1–2	0–2	—

Source: UEFA

== Knockout phase ==
In the knockout phase, teams played against each other over two legs on a home-and-away basis, except for the one-match final. The mechanism of the draws for each round was as follows:

- In the draw for the knockout round play-offs, the eight group runners-up were seeded, and the eight Europa League group third-placed teams were unseeded. The seeded teams were drawn against the unseeded teams, with the seeded teams hosting the second leg. Teams from the same association could not be drawn against each other.
- In the draw for the round of 16, the eight group winners were seeded, and the eight winners of the knockout round play-offs were unseeded. Again, the seeded teams were drawn against the unseeded teams, with the seeded teams hosting the second leg. Teams from the same association could not be drawn against each other.
- In the draws for the quarter-finals onwards, there were no seedings, and teams from the same association could be drawn against each other. As the draws for the quarter-finals and semi-finals were held together before the quarter-finals were played, the identity of the quarter-final winners was not known at the time of the semi-final draw. A draw was also held to determine which semi-final winner would be designated as the "home" team for the final (for administrative purposes as it was played at a neutral venue).

=== Bracket ===
Knockout round play-offs
(Netherlands) Ajax (a.e.t.)	2	2	4
(Norway) Bodø/Glimt	2	1	3
(Austria) Sturm Graz	4	1	5
(Slovakia) Slovan Bratislava	1	0	1
(Greece) Olympiacos	1	1	2
(Hungary) Ferencváros	0	0	0
(Belgium) Union Saint-Gilloise	2	2	4
(Germany) Eintracht Frankfurt	2	1	3
(Switzerland) Servette	0	1	1
(Bulgaria) Ludogorets Razgrad	0	0	0
(Israel) Maccabi Haifa	1	1	2
(Belgium) Gent	0	1	1
(Norway) Molde	3	3	6
(Poland) Legia Warsaw	2	0	2
(Spain) Real Betis	0	1	1
(Croatia) Dinamo Zagreb	1	1	2

Round of 16
(Netherlands) Ajax	0	0	0
(England) Aston Villa	0	4	4
(Austria) Sturm Graz	0	1	1
(France) Lille	3	1	4
(Greece) Olympiacos (a.e.t.)	1	6	7
(Israel) Maccabi Tel Aviv	4	1	5
(Belgium) Union Saint-Gilloise	0	1	1
(Turkey) Fenerbahçe	3	0	3
(Switzerland) Servette	0	0	0 (1)
(Czech Republic) Viktoria Plzeň (p)	0	0	0 (3)
(Israel) Maccabi Haifa	3	1	4
(Italy) Fiorentina	4	1	5
(Norway) Molde	2	0	2
(Belgium) Club Brugge	1	3	4
(Croatia) Dinamo Zagreb	2	1	3
(Greece) PAOK	0	5	5

Quarter-finals
(England) Aston Villa (p)	2	1	3 (4)
(France) Lille	1	2	3 (3)
(Greece) Olympiacos (p)	3	0	3 (3)
(Turkey) Fenerbahçe	2	1	3 (2)
(Czech Republic) Viktoria Plzeň	0	0	0
(Italy) Fiorentina (a.e.t.)	0	2	2
(Belgium) Club Brugge	1	2	3
(Greece) PAOK	0	0	0

Semi-finals
(England) Aston Villa	2	0	2
(Greece) Olympiacos	4	2	6
(Italy) Fiorentina	3	1	4
(Belgium) Club Brugge	2	1	3

Final
29 May – Athens
(Greece) Olympiacos (a.e.t.)	1
(Italy) Fiorentina	0

=== Knockout round play-offs ===
The draw for the knockout round play-offs was held on 18 December 2023, 14:00 CET. The first legs were played on 15 February, and the second legs were played on 21 and 22 February 2024.

Team 1	Agg.	Team 2	1st leg	2nd leg
Sturm Graz (Austria)	5–1	(Slovakia) Slovan Bratislava	4–1	1–0
Servette (Switzerland)	1–0	(Bulgaria) Ludogorets Razgrad	0–0	1–0
Union Saint-Gilloise (Belgium)	4–3	(Germany) Eintracht Frankfurt	2–2	2–1
Real Betis (Spain)	1–2	(Croatia) Dinamo Zagreb	0–1	1–1
Olympiacos (Greece)	2–0	(Hungary) Ferencváros	1–0	1–0
Ajax (Netherlands)	4–3	(Norway) Bodø/Glimt	2–2	2–1 (a.e.t.)
Molde (Norway)	6–2	(Poland) Legia Warsaw	3–2	3–0
Maccabi Haifa (Israel)	2–1	(Belgium) Gent	1–0	1–1

=== Round of 16 ===
The draw for the round of 16 was held on 23 February 2024, 13:00 CET. The first legs were played on 7 March, and the second legs were played on 14 March 2024.

Team 1	Agg.	Team 2	1st leg	2nd leg
Servette (Switzerland)	0–0 (1–3 p)	(Czech Republic) Viktoria Plzeň	0–0	0–0 (a.e.t.)
Ajax (Netherlands)	0–4	(England) Aston Villa	0–0	0–4
Molde (Norway)	2–4	(Belgium) Club Brugge	2–1	0–3
Union Saint-Gilloise (Belgium)	1–3	(Turkey) Fenerbahçe	0–3	1–0
Dinamo Zagreb (Croatia)	3–5	(Greece) PAOK	2–0	1–5
Sturm Graz (Austria)	1–4	(France) Lille	0–3	1–1
Maccabi Haifa (Israel)	4–5	(Italy) Fiorentina	3–4	1–1
Olympiacos (Greece)	7–5	(Israel) Maccabi Tel Aviv	1–4	6–1 (a.e.t.)

=== Quarter-finals ===
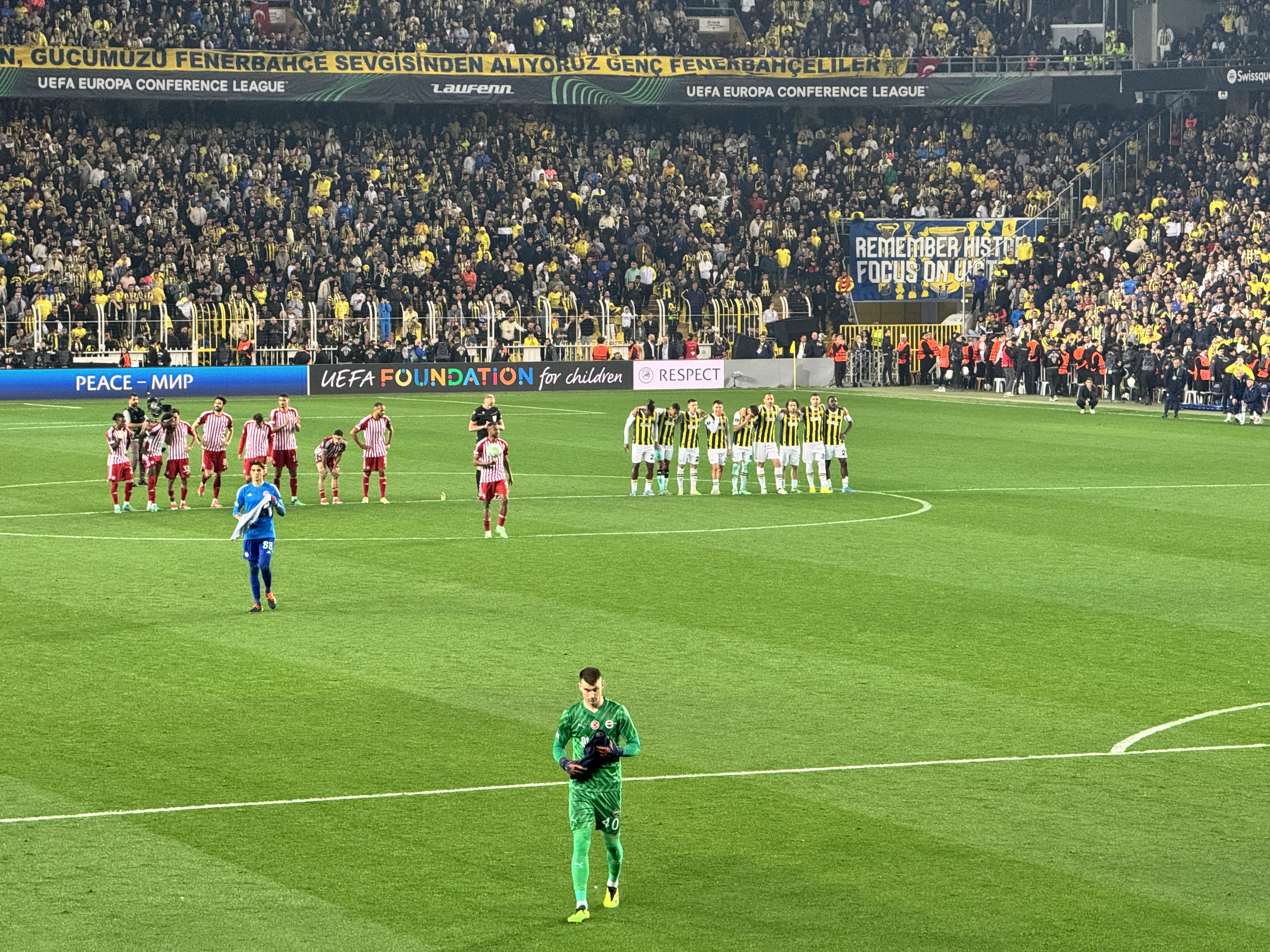
Fenerbahçe v Olympiacos penalty shoot-out.

The draw for the quarter-finals was held on 15 March 2024, 14:00 CET. The first legs were played on 11 April, and the second legs were played on 18 April 2024.

Team 1	Agg.	Team 2	1st leg	2nd leg
Club Brugge (Belgium)	3–0	(Greece) PAOK	1–0	2–0
Olympiacos (Greece)	3–3 (3–2 p)	(Turkey) Fenerbahçe	3–2	0–1 (a.e.t.)
Aston Villa (England)	3–3 (4–3 p)	(France) Lille	2–1	1–2 (a.e.t.)
Viktoria Plzeň (Czech Republic)	0–2	(Italy) Fiorentina	0–0	0–2 (a.e.t.)

=== Semi-finals ===
The draw for the semi-finals was held on 15 March 2024, 14:00 CET, after the quarter-final draw. The first legs were played on 2 May, and the second legs were played on 8 and 9 May 2024.

Team 1	Agg.	Team 2	1st leg	2nd leg
Aston Villa (England)	2–6	(Greece) Olympiacos	2–4	0–2
Fiorentina (Italy)	4–3	(Belgium) Club Brugge	3–2	1–1

=== Final ===
The final was played on 29 May 2024 at the Agia Sophia Stadium in Athens, Greece. A draw was held on 15 March 2024, after the quarter-final and semi-final draws, to determine the "home" team for administrative purposes.

29 May 2024
22:00 UTC+3

Olympiacos (Greece)	1–0 (a.e.t.)	(Italy) Fiorentina
El Kaabi 116'	Report

Agia Sophia Stadium, Athens
Attendance: 26,842
Referee: Artur Soares Dias (Portugal)

== Statistics ==
Statistics exclude qualifying rounds and play-off round.

=== Top goalscorers ===
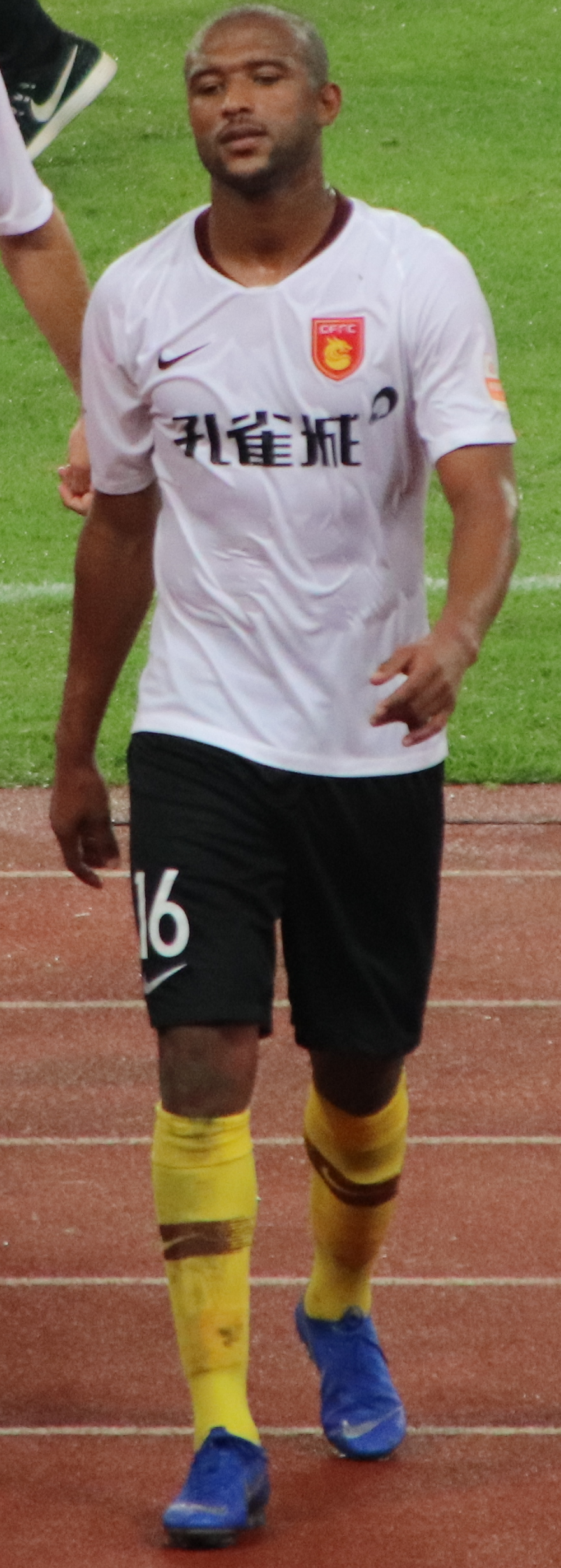
Olympiacos forward Ayoub El Kaabi finished the tournament as the top scorer with 11 goals, and was named the inaugural Europa Conference League Player of the Season.

Rank	Player	Team	Goals	Minutes played
1	(Morocco) Ayoub El Kaabi	(Greece) Olympiacos	11	845
2	(Israel) Eran Zahavi	(Israel) Maccabi Tel Aviv	8	726
3	(Croatia) Bruno Petković	(Croatia) Dinamo Zagreb	7	608
4	(Belgium) Hans Vanaken	(Belgium) Club Brugge	6	990
5	(Norway) Fredrik Gulbrandsen	(Norway) Molde	5	349
5	(Sweden) Benjamin Nygren	(Denmark) Nordsjælland	5	368
5	(Nigeria) Gift Orban	(Belgium) Gent	5	389
5	(Turkey) Yusuf Yazıcı	(France) Lille	5	663
5	(Israel) Dor Peretz	(Israel) Maccabi Tel Aviv	5	750
5	(England) Ollie Watkins	(England) Aston Villa	5	755
5	(Brazil) Igor Thiago	(Belgium) Club Brugge	5	758

=== Team of the Season ===
The UEFA technical study group selected the following players as the team of the tournament.

Pos.	Player	Team
GK	(Italy) Pietro Terracciano	(Italy) Fiorentina
DF	(Brazil) Dodô	(Italy) Fiorentina
DF	(Czech Republic) Robin Hranáč	(Czech Republic) Viktoria Plzeň
DF	(Angola) David Carmo	(Greece) Olympiacos
DF	(Italy) Cristiano Biraghi	(Italy) Fiorentina
MF	(Belgium) Hans Vanaken	(Belgium) Club Brugge
MF	(Greece) Kostas Fortounis	(Greece) Olympiacos
MF	(Scotland) John McGinn	(England) Aston Villa
FW	(Jamaica) Leon Bailey	(England) Aston Villa
FW	(Morocco) Ayoub El Kaabi	(Greece) Olympiacos
FW	(Portugal) Daniel Podence	(Greece) Olympiacos

=== Player of the Season ===
- (Morocco) Ayoub El Kaabi ( (Greece) Olympiacos)

=== Young Player of the Season ===
- (Brazil) Igor Thiago ( (Belgium) Club Brugge)

== See also ==
- 2023–24 UEFA Champions League
- 2023–24 UEFA Europa League
- 2024 UEFA Super Cup
- 2023–24 UEFA Women's Champions League
- 2023–24 UEFA Youth League
