= 2023–24 UEFA Europa Conference League qualifying (third and play-off round matches) =

European football competition

This page summarises the matches of the third qualifying and play-off rounds of 2023–24 UEFA Europa Conference League qualifying.

Times are CEST (UTC+2), as listed by UEFA (local times, if different, are in parentheses).

== Third qualifying round ==
=== Summary ===
The first legs were played on 9 and 10 August, and the second legs were played on 16 and 17 August 2023.

The winners of the ties advanced to the play-off round of their respective path. The losers were eliminated from European competitions for the season.

Team 1	Agg.	Team 2	1st leg	2nd leg
Champions Path
Hamrun Spartans (Malta)	2–8	(Hungary) Ferencváros	1–6	1–2
Farul Constanța (Romania)	5–0	(Estonia) Flora	3–0	2–0
Valmiera (Latvia)	1–3	(Albania) Partizani	1–2	0–1
Ballkani (Kosovo)	5–1	(Gibraltar) Lincoln Red Imps	2–0	3–1
Struga (North Macedonia)	4–3	(Luxembourg) Swift Hesperange	3–1	1–2
Main Path
AEK Larnaca (Cyprus)	1–2	(Israel) Maccabi Tel Aviv	1–1	0–1
Sabah (Azerbaijan)	2–2 (4–5 p)	(Serbia) Partizan	2–0	0–2 (a.e.t.)
Sepsi OSK (Romania)	2–1	(Kazakhstan) Aktobe	1–1	1–0
Rapid Wien (Austria)	5–0	(Hungary) Debrecen	0–0	5–0
Hajduk Split (Croatia)	0–3	(Greece) PAOK	0–0	0–3
FC Santa Coloma (Andorra)	0–3	(Netherlands) AZ	0–1	0–2
Celje (Slovenia)	5–1	(Belarus) Neman Grodno	1–0	4–1
Neftçi (Azerbaijan)	2–5 (Note: Order of legs reversed after original draw.)	(Turkey) Beşiktaş	1–3	1–2
Omonia (Cyprus)	2–5	(Denmark) Midtjylland	1–0	1–5
Aris (Greece)	2–2 (5–6 p)	(Ukraine) Dynamo Kyiv	1–0	1–2 (a.e.t.)
Legia Warsaw (Poland)	6–5	Austria Wien	1–2	5–3
Hapoel Be'er Sheva (Israel)	1–2	(Bulgaria) Levski Sofia	0–0	1–2
Hibernian (Scotland)	5–3	(Switzerland) Luzern	3–1	2–2
Viktoria Plzeň (Czech Republic)	6–0	(Malta) Gżira United	4–0	2–0
Arouca (Portugal)	3–4	(Norway) Brann	2–1	1–3
Gent (Belgium)	6–2	(Poland) Pogoń Szczecin	5–0	1–2
Adana Demirspor (Turkey)	7–4	(Croatia) Osijek	5–1	2–3
B36 (Faroe Islands)	1–5	(Croatia) Rijeka	1–3	0–2
Twente (Netherlands)	5–0	(Latvia) Riga	2–0	3–0
Rosenborg (Norway)	3–4	(Scotland) Heart of Midlothian	2–1	1–3
Fenerbahçe (Turkey)	6–1	(Slovenia) Maribor	3–1	3–0
Club Brugge (Belgium)	10–2	(Iceland) KA	5–1	5–1
Dila Gori (Georgia (country))	0–3	(Cyprus) APOEL	0–2	0–1
Lech Poznań (Poland)	3–4	(Slovakia) Spartak Trnava	2–1	1–3
FCSB (Romania)	0–2	(Denmark) Nordsjælland	0–0	0–2
Tobol (Kazakhstan)	1–1 (6–5 p)	(Republic of Ireland) Derry City	1–0	0–1 (a.e.t.)
Bodø/Glimt (Norway)	6–0	(Armenia) Pyunik	3–0	3–0

=== Champions Path matches ===
10 August 2023
19:30

Hamrun Spartans (Malta)	1–6	(Hungary) Ferencváros
Montebello 89'	Report	Abu Fani 3'; Zachariassen 51'; B. Varga 53', 56', 65'; Owusu 90'

National Stadium, Ta' Qali (Note: Hamrun Spartans played their third qualifying round home match at the National Stadium in Ta' Qali, instead of their regular stadium, the Victor Tedesco Stadium in Hamrun, which did not meet UEFA requirements.)
Attendance: 2,244
Referee: Eldorjan Hamiti (Albania)
17 August 2023
19:00

Ferencváros (Hungary)	2–1	(Malta) Hamrun Spartans
Traoré 41'; B. Varga 69'	Report	Mbong 6'

Ferencváros Stadion, Budapest
Attendance: 11,375
Referee: Georgi Davidov (Bulgaria)

Ferencváros won 8–2 on aggregate.

10 August 2023
19:30 (20:30 UTC+3)

Farul Constanța (Romania)	3–0	(Estonia) Flora
Alibec 48'; Budescu 80'; Queirós 90+5'	Report

Stadionul Viitorul, Ovidiu
Attendance: 4,076
Referee: Ioannis Papadopoulos (Greece)
16 August 2023
18:00 (19:00 UTC+3)

Flora (Estonia)	0–2	(Romania) Farul Constanța
	Report	Rivaldinho 3'; Budescu 18'

Lilleküla Stadium, Tallinn
Attendance: 1,010
Referee: Luka Bilbija (Bosnia and Herzegovina)

Farul Constanța won 5–0 on aggregate.

10 August 2023
19:00 (20:00 UTC+3)

Valmiera (Latvia)	1–2	(Albania) Partizani
Gustavo 27'	Report	Cara 58'; Rrapaj 76'

Skonto Stadium, Riga (Note: Valmiera played their home match at the Skonto Stadium in Riga, instead of their regular stadium, the Jānis Daliņš Stadium in Valmiera, which did not meet UEFA requirements.)
Attendance: 1,524
Referee: Joni Hyytiä (Finland)
17 August 2023
20:00

Partizani (Albania)	1–0	(Latvia) Valmiera
Cara 21' (pen.)	Report

Elbasan Arena, Elbasan (Note: Partizani played their home match at the Elbasan Arena in Elbasan, instead of their regular stadium, the Partizani Complex in Tirana, which did not meet UEFA requirements.)
Attendance: 1,200
Referee: Sandi Putros (Denmark)

Partizani won 3–1 on aggregate.

10 August 2023
20:45

Ballkani (Kosovo)	2–0	(Gibraltar) Lincoln Red Imps
Korenica 59'; Trashi 62'	Report

Fadil Vokrri Stadium, Pristina (Note: Ballkani played their home match at the Fadil Vokrri Stadium in Pristina, instead of their regular stadium, the Theranda City Stadium, in Suva Reka, which did not meet UEFA requirements.)
Attendance: 4,000
Referee: Kristoffer Karlsson (Sweden)
17 August 2023
18:00

Lincoln Red Imps (Gibraltar)	1–3	(Kosovo) Ballkani
Juampe 66'	Report	Korenica 48'; Kuč 64'; Zyba 90+8'

Victoria Stadium, Gibraltar
Attendance: 724
Referee: Kristoffer Hagenes (Norway)

Ballkani won 5–1 on aggregate.

10 August 2023
17:00

Struga (North Macedonia)	3–1	(Luxembourg) Swift Hesperange
Ibraimi 23', 40' (pen.), 77' (pen.)	Report	Stolz 46'

Petar Miloševski Training Centre, Skopje (Note: Struga played their home match at the Petar Miloševski Training Centre in Skopje, instead of their regular stadium, the Gradska Plaža Stadium in Struga, which did not meet UEFA requirements.)
Attendance: 423
Referee: Jakob Alexander Sundberg (Denmark)
17 August 2023
20:00

Swift Hesperange (Luxembourg)	2–1	(North Macedonia) Struga
Hemkemeier 70'; Akhalaia 90+4'	Report	Ibraimi 17'

Stade de Luxembourg, Luxembourg City (Note: Swift Hesperange played their home match at the Stade de Luxembourg in Luxembourg City, instead of their regular stadium, Stade Alphonse Theis, in Hesperange, which did not meet UEFA requirements.)
Attendance: 1,402
Referee: Helgi Mikael Jónasson (Iceland)

Struga won 4–3 on aggregate.

=== Main Path matches ===
9 August 2023
19:00 (20:00 UTC+3)

AEK Larnaca (Cyprus)	1–1	(Israel) Maccabi Tel Aviv
Faraj 80'	Report	Cohen 64'

AEK Arena – Georgios Karapatakis, Larnaca
Attendance: 4,745
Referee: Jonathan Lardot (Belgium)
17 August 2023
19:00 (20:00 UTC+3)

Maccabi Tel Aviv (Israel)	1–0	(Cyprus) AEK Larnaca
Zahavi 86' (pen.)	Report

Bloomfield Stadium, Tel Aviv
Attendance: 26,152
Referee: Fran Jović (Croatia)

Maccabi Tel Aviv won 2–1 on aggregate.

10 August 2023
18:00 (20:00 UTC+4)

Sabah (Azerbaijan)	2–0	(Serbia) Partizan
Letić 70'; Isayev 74'	Report

Bank Respublika Arena, Masazır
Attendance: 6,000
Referee: Giorgi Kruashvili (Georgia)
17 August 2023
21:00

Partizan (Serbia)	2–0 (a.e.t.)	(Azerbaijan) Sabah
Saldanha 30'; Natcho 58'	Report
Penalties
Pavlović (penalty scored); Nikolić (penalty scored); Kalulu (penalty scored); Antić (penalty scored); Baždar (penalty scored)	5–4	(penalty scored) Isayev; (penalty scored) Apeh; (penalty scored) C. Nuriyev; (penalty scored) Christian; (penalty missed) Ələsgərov

Partizan Stadium, Belgrade
Attendance: 14,225
Referee: Bartosz Frankowski (Poland)

2–2 on aggregate; Partizan won 5–4 on penalties.

10 August 2023
19:00 (20:00 UTC+3)

Sepsi OSK (Romania)	1–1	(Kazakhstan) Aktobe
Varga 89'	Report	Santana 65'

Stadionul Sepsi Arena, Sfântu Gheorghe
Attendance: 8,170
Referee: Visar Kastrati (Kosovo)
17 August 2023
18:00 (21:00 UTC+5)

Aktobe (Kazakhstan)	0–1	(Romania) Sepsi OSK
	Report	Păun 66'

Central Stadium, Aktobe
Attendance: 12,354
Referee: Daniele Chiffi (Italy)

Sepsi OSK won 2–1 on aggregate.

10 August 2023
21:00

Rapid Wien (Austria)	0–0	(Hungary) Debrecen
	Report

Weststadion, Vienna
Attendance: 17,200
Referee: Rob Hennessy (Republic of Ireland)
17 August 2023
21:00

Debrecen (Hungary)	0–5	(Austria) Rapid Wien
	Report	Seidl 15'; Romanchuk 43' (o.g.); Grüll 52'; Burgstaller 72'; Baranyai 90' (o.g.)

Nagyerdei Stadion, Debrecen
Attendance: 16,572
Referee: Aleksandar Stavrev (North Macedonia)

Rapid Wien won 5–0 on aggregate.

10 August 2023
21:00

Hajduk Split (Croatia)	0–0	(Greece) PAOK
	Report

Stadion Poljud, Split
Attendance: 33,573
Referee: Morten Krogh (Denmark)
17 August 2023
19:30 (20:30 UTC+3)

PAOK (Greece)	3–0	(Croatia) Hajduk Split
Schwab 12' (pen.); A. Živković 79', 85'	Report

Toumba Stadium, Thessaloniki
Attendance: 24,133
Referee: Sascha Stegemann (Germany)

PAOK won 3–0 on aggregate.

10 August 2023
19:00

FC Santa Coloma (Andorra)	0–1	(Netherlands) AZ
	Report	Mihailovic 75'

Estadi Nacional, Andorra la Vella (Note: FC Santa Coloma played their third qualifying round home match at the Estadi Nacional in Andorra la Vella, instead of their regular stadium, the Estadi Comunal d'Andorra la Vella in Andorra la Vella, which did not meet UEFA requirements.)
Attendance: 716
Referee: Sayat Karabayev (Kazakhstan)
17 August 2023
20:45

AZ (Netherlands)	2–0	(Andorra) FC Santa Coloma
Van Bommel 41'; Lahdo 78'	Report

AFAS Stadion, Alkmaar
Attendance: 10,014
Referee: Henrik Nalbandyan (Armenia)

AZ won 3–0 on aggregate.

10 August 2023
20:00

Celje (Slovenia)	1–0	(Belarus) Neman Grodno
Ikwuemesi 69'	Report

Stožice Stadium, Ljubljana (Note: Celje played their third qualifying round home match at the Stožice Stadium in Ljubljana, instead of their regular stadium, the Stadion Z'dežele in Celje, which did not meet UEFA requirements.)
Attendance: 2,167
Referee: Daniyar Sakhi (Kazakhstan)
17 August 2023
20:00

Neman Grodno (Belarus)	1–4	(Slovenia) Celje
Shukurov 82'	Report	Bobičanec 21', 55'; Lamy 35', 67'

Ménfői úti Stadion, Győr, Hungary (Note: Due to the country's involvement in the Russian invasion of Ukraine, Belarusian teams were required to play their home matches at neutral venues and behind closed doors until further notice.)
Attendance: 0
Referee: Ferenc Karakó (Hungary)

Celje won 5–1 on aggregate.

10 August 2023
19:00 (21:00 UTC+4)

Neftçi (Azerbaijan)	1–3	(Turkey) Beşiktaş
Lebon 79'	Report	Aboubakar 14'; Muleka 23'; Uçan 62'

Bakcell Arena, Baku
Attendance: 11,000
Referee: Lukas Fähndrich (Switzerland)
17 August 2023
19:00 (20:00 UTC+3)

Beşiktaş (Turkey)	2–1	(Azerbaijan) Neftçi
Aboubakar 57'; Muleka 71'	Report	Mahmudov 36'

Beşiktaş Park, Istanbul
Attendance: 21,890
Referee: Julian Weinberger (Austria)

Beşiktaş won 5–2 on aggregate.

10 August 2023
19:00 (20:00 UTC+3)

Omonia (Cyprus)	1–0	(Denmark) Midtjylland
Bezus 38'	Report

GSP Stadium, Nicosia
Attendance: 14,571
Referee: Sigurd Kringstad (Norway)
17 August 2023
19:45

Midtjylland (Denmark)	5–1	(Cyprus) Omonia
Cho Gue-sung 27' (pen.); Franculino 43', 45+2', 64'; Gigović 80'	Report	Kakoullis 31'

MCH Arena, Herning
Attendance: 7,008
Referee: Ian McNabb (Northern Ireland)

Midtjylland won 5–2 on aggregate.

10 August 2023
20:15 (21:15 UTC+3)

Aris (Greece)	1–0	(Ukraine) Dynamo Kyiv
Palma 69' (pen.)	Report

Kleanthis Vikelidis Stadium, Thessaloniki
Attendance: 11,847
Referee: Jarred Gillett (England)
17 August 2023
19:00 (20:00 UTC+3)

Dynamo Kyiv (Ukraine)	2–1 (a.e.t.)	(Greece) Aris
Voloshyn 45'; Karavayev 85'	Report	Đurasek 39'
Penalties
Brazhko (penalty scored); Andriyevskyi (penalty scored); Diallo (penalty scored); Parris (penalty missed); Benito (penalty scored); Dyachuk (penalty scored); Dubinchak (penalty scored)	6–5	(penalty scored) Fabiano; (penalty missed) Menéndez; (penalty scored) Rupp; (penalty scored) Ferrari; (penalty scored) Christodoulopoulos; (penalty scored) Zamora; (penalty missed) Odubajo

Stadionul Rapid-Giulești, Bucharest, Romania (Note: Due to the Russian invasion of Ukraine, Ukrainian teams were required to play their home matches at neutral venues until further notice.)
Attendance: 4,461
Referee: Sebastian Gishamer (Austria)

2–2 on aggregate; Dynamo Kyiv won 6–5 on penalties.

10 August 2023
19:00

Legia Warsaw (Poland)	1–2	Austria Wien
Muçi 87'	Report	Huskovic 11', 56'

Stadion Wojska Polskiego, Warsaw
Attendance: 26,519
Referee: Pierre Gaillouste (France)
17 August 2023
19:00

Austria Wien	3–5	(Poland) Legia Warsaw
Gruber 69', 83'; Ranftl 90+7'	Report	Elitim 39'; Gual 45+1'; Pekhart 59'; Rosołek 87'; Muçi 90+10'

Franz Horr Stadium, Vienna
Attendance: 10,288
Referee: István Vad (Hungary)

Legia Warsaw won 6–5 on aggregate.

10 August 2023
19:30 (20:30 UTC+3)

Hapoel Be'er Sheva (Israel)	0–0	(Bulgaria) Levski Sofia
	Report

Turner Stadium, Be'er Sheva
Attendance: 8,974
Referee: Miguel Nogueira (Portugal)
17 August 2023
19:00 (20:00 UTC+3)

Levski Sofia (Bulgaria)	2–1	(Israel) Hapoel Be'er Sheva
Welton Felipe 15'; Ronaldo 90+6'	Report	Stoyanov 79'

Stadion Georgi Asparuhov, Sofia
Attendance: 16,832
Referee: Dumitri Muntean (Moldova)

Levski Sofia won 2–1 on aggregate.

10 August 2023
20:30 (19:30 UTC+1)

Hibernian (Scotland)	3–1	(Switzerland) Luzern
Newell 46'; Vente 72'; Obita 90'	Report	Beka 56'

Easter Road, Edinburgh
Attendance: 13,075
Referee: Robertas Valikonis (Lithuania)
17 August 2023
20:45

Luzern (Switzerland)	2–2	(Scotland) Hibernian
Kadák 16'; Ademi 67'	Report	Youan 10'; Boyle 73'

Swissporarena, Lucerne
Attendance: 13,987
Referee: Aristotelis Diamantopoulos (Greece)

Hibernian won 5–3 on aggregate.

10 August 2023
19:00

Viktoria Plzeň (Czech Republic)	4–0	(Malta) Gżira United
Bucha 10'; Durosinmi 23'; Šulc 73'; Kopic 90+4'	Report

Doosan Arena, Plzeň
Attendance: 10,142
Referee: Vilhjálmur Þórarinsson (Iceland)
17 August 2023
19:00

Gżira United (Malta)	0–2	(Czech Republic) Viktoria Plzeň
	Report	Traoré 47'; Vlkanova 70'

National Stadium, Ta' Qali
Attendance: 365
Referee: Denys Shurman (Ukraine)

Viktoria Plzeň won 6–0 on aggregate.

10 August 2023
20:00 (19:00 UTC+1)

Arouca (Portugal)	2–1	(Norway) Brann
Mújica 23'; González 74'	Report	Warming 80'

Estádio Municipal, Arouca
Attendance: 2,388
Referee: David Munro (Scotland)
17 August 2023
19:00

Brann (Norway)	3–1	(Portugal) Arouca
Myhre 6'; Knudsen 42'; Finne 45'	Report	Sylla 57'

Brann Stadion, Bergen
Attendance: 14,119
Referee: Bram Van Driessche (Belgium)

Brann won 4–3 on aggregate.

9 August 2023
20:00

Gent (Belgium)	5–0	(Poland) Pogoń Szczecin
Orban 13', 35', 64'; Cuypers 40', 45+1'	Report

Ghelamco Arena, Ghent
Attendance: 11,326
Referee: Vassilis Fotias (Greece)
17 August 2023
18:00

Pogoń Szczecin (Poland)	2–1	(Belgium) Gent
Koulouris 79', 86'	Report	Cuypers 90+5'

Stadion Miejski im. Floriana Krygiera, Szczecin
Attendance: 11,549
Referee: Ruddy Buquet (France)

Gent won 6–2 on aggregate.

10 August 2023
20:00 (21:00 UTC+3)

Adana Demirspor (Turkey)	5–1	(Croatia) Osijek
Svensson 3'; Sari 16'; Ndiaye 52', 67' (pen.); Erdoğan 88'	Report	Gržan 73' (pen.)

New Adana Stadium, Adana
Attendance: 17,719
Referee: Goga Kikacheishvili (Georgia)
17 August 2023
20:00

Osijek (Croatia)	3–2	(Turkey) Adana Demirspor
Nejašmić 43'; Caktaš 59'; Gržan 82' (pen.)	Report	Sari 31'; Erdoğan 90+1'

Opus Arena, Osijek
Attendance: 8,444
Referee: John Brooks (England)

Adana Demirspor won 7–4 on aggregate.

10 August 2023
20:00 (19:00 UTC+1)

B36 (Faroe Islands)	1–3	(Croatia) Rijeka
Agnarsson 33'	Report	Janković 41' (pen.); Goda 48'; Radeljić 88'

Tórsvøllur, Tórshavn (Note: B36 Tórshavn played their third qualifying round home match at Tórsvøllur in Tórshavn, instead of their regular stadium, the Gundadalur Stadium in Tórshavn, which did not meet UEFA requirements.)
Attendance: 1,161
Referee: Mohammed Al-Emara (Finland)
17 August 2023
20:15

Rijeka (Croatia)	2–0	(Faroe Islands) B36
Pašalić 14'; Grgić 82'	Report

Stadion Rujevica, Rijeka
Attendance: 6,934
Referee: Oleksii Derevinskyi (Ukraine)

Rijeka won 5–1 on aggregate.

10 August 2023
20:00

Twente (Netherlands)	2–0	(Latvia) Riga
Sampsted 11'; Rots 67'	Report

De Grolsch Veste, Enschede
Attendance: 26,000
Referee: Robert Schröder (Germany)
17 August 2023
19:00 (20:00 UTC+3)

Riga (Latvia)	0–3	(Netherlands) Twente
	Report	Rots 57'; Besselink 90'; Ünüvar 90+2'

Skonto Stadium, Riga
Attendance: 6,324
Referee: Chrysovalantis Theouli (Cyprus)

Twente won 5–0 on aggregate.

10 August 2023
19:00

Rosenborg (Norway)	2–1	(Scotland) Heart of Midlothian
Frederiksen 15'; Nelson 45+2'	Report	Shankland 79'

Lerkendal Stadion, Trondheim
Attendance: 11,882
Referee: Andrei Chivulete (Romania)
17 August 2023
20:45 (19:45 UTC+1)

Heart of Midlothian (Scotland)	3–1	(Norway) Rosenborg
Shankland 13'; Devlin 50', 90+2'	Report	Þorvaldsson 6'

Tynecastle Park, Edinburgh
Attendance: 17,942
Referee: David Fuxman (Israel)

Heart of Midlothian won 4–3 on aggregate.

10 August 2023
20:00 (21:00 UTC+3)

Fenerbahçe (Turkey)	3–1	(Slovenia) Maribor
Becão 58'; Kahveci 62'; Tadić 90+3' (pen.)	Report	Strajnar 72'

Şükrü Saracoğlu Stadium, Istanbul
Attendance: 33,015
Referee: Robert Jones (England)
17 August 2023
20:15

Maribor (Slovenia)	0–3	(Turkey) Fenerbahçe
	Report	Kahveci 17'; Szymański 77'; Tadić 79'

Ljudski vrt, Maribor
Attendance: 10,100
Referee: Fábio Veríssimo (Portugal)

Fenerbahçe won 6–1 on aggregate.

10 August 2023
20:00

Club Brugge (Belgium)	5–1	(Iceland) KA
Spileers 10'; Vanaken 40'; Skov Olsen 41'; Thiago 45' (pen.); Yaremchuk 77'	Report	Willard 60'

Jan Breydel Stadium, Bruges
Attendance: 16,811
Referee: Miloš Milanović (Serbia)
17 August 2023
20:00 (18:00 UTC+0)

KA (Iceland)	1–5	(Belgium) Club Brugge
Petersen 59'	Report	Boyata 7'; Skóraś 45+3'; Yaremchuk 57', 65', 75'

Laugardalsvöllur, Reykjavík (Note: KA played their third qualifying round home match at the Laugardalsvöllur in Reykjavík, instead of their regular stadium, the Greifavöllurinn in Akureyri, which did not meet UEFA requirements.)
Attendance: 935
Referee: Michael Fabbri (Italy)

Club Brugge won 10–2 on aggregate.

10 August 2023
19:00 (21:00 UTC+4)

Dila Gori (Georgia (country))	0–2	(Cyprus) APOEL
	Report	Crespo 45+1'; Efrem 64'

Boris Paichadze Dinamo Arena, Tbilisi (Note: Dila Gori played their third qualifying round home match at the Boris Paichadze Dinamo Arena in Tbilisi, instead of their regular stadium, the Tengiz Burjanadze Stadium in Gori, which did not meet UEFA requirements.)
Attendance: 8,593
Referee: Jasmin Sabotic (Luxembourg)
17 August 2023
19:00 (20:00 UTC+3)

APOEL (Cyprus)	1–0	(Georgia (country)) Dila Gori
Ndongala 48'	Report

GSP Stadium, Nicosia
Attendance: 11,853
Referee: Robert Ian Jenkins (Wales)

APOEL won 3–0 on aggregate.

10 August 2023
20:00

Lech Poznań (Poland)	2–1	(Slovakia) Spartak Trnava
Marchwiński 46'; Velde 63'	Report	Štetina 87'

Stadion Poznań, Poznań
Attendance: 29,122
Referee: Atilla Karaoğlan (Turkey)
17 August 2023
20:00

Spartak Trnava (Slovakia)	3–1	(Poland) Lech Poznań
Ofori 37'; Daniel 50'; Štetina 74'	Report	Velde 63'

Anton Malatinský Stadium, Trnava
Attendance: 16,708
Referee: César Soto Grado (Spain)

Spartak Trnava won 4–3 on aggregate.

10 August 2023
20:30 (21:30 UTC+3)

FCSB (Romania)	0–0	(Denmark) Nordsjælland
	Report

Stadionul Steaua, Bucharest (Note: FCSB played their third qualifying round home match at the Stadionul Steaua, Bucharest, instead of their regular stadium, the Arena Națională, Bucharest.)
Attendance: 27,135
Referee: Miloš Bošković (Montenegro)
17 August 2023
18:30

Nordsjælland (Denmark)	2–0	(Romania) FCSB
Ingvartsen 43' (pen.), 85'	Report

Right to Dream Park, Farum
Attendance: 5,704
Referee: Genc Nuza (Kosovo)

Nordsjælland won 2–0 on aggregate.

10 August 2023
16:00 (20:00 UTC+6)

Tobol (Kazakhstan)	1–0	(Republic of Ireland) Derry City
Asrankulov 65'	Report

Central Stadium, Kostanay
Attendance: 8,420
Referee: Walter Altmann (Austria)
17 August 2023
20:45 (19:45 UTC+1)

Derry City (Republic of Ireland)	1–0 (a.e.t.)	(Kazakhstan) Tobol
Patching 15' (pen.)	Report
Penalties
P. McEleney (penalty scored); B. Kavanagh (penalty scored); Mullen (penalty scored); McEneff (penalty scored); Doherty (penalty missed); C. Kavanagh (penalty scored); Maher (penalty missed)	5–6	(penalty scored) Orazov; (penalty scored) Vukadinović; (penalty scored) Shakhov; (penalty scored) Asrankulov; (penalty missed) Ilić; (penalty scored) Mlađović; (penalty scored) Kireyenko

Tallaght Stadium, Tallaght (Note: Derry City played their third qualifying round home match at Tallaght Stadium, Tallaght, instead of their regular stadium, Ryan McBride Brandywell Stadium, Derry, which did not meet UEFA requirements.)
Attendance: 3,128
Referee: Peter Kráľovič (Slovakia)

1–1 on aggregate; Tobol won 6–5 on penalties.

10 August 2023
18:00

Bodø/Glimt (Norway)	3–0	(Armenia) Pyunik
Grønbæk 6'; Moumbagna 31'; Pellegrino 56'	Report

Aspmyra Stadion, Bodø
Attendance: 6,009
Referee: Ion Orlic (Moldova)
17 August 2023
18:00 (20:00 UTC+4)

Pyunik (Armenia)	0–3	(Norway) Bodø/Glimt
	Report	Pellegrino 43' (pen.); Berg 49'; Gulliksen 54'

Vazgen Sargsyan Republican Stadium, Yerevan
Attendance: 5,230
Referee: Matthew De Gabriele (Malta)

Bodø/Glimt won 6–0 on aggregate.

== Play-off round ==
=== Summary ===
The first legs were played on 23 and 24 August, and the second legs were played on 31 August 2023.

The winners of the ties advanced to the group stage. The losers were eliminated from European competitions for the season.

In this season, the video assistant referee (VAR) was used from this stage.

Team 1	Agg.	Team 2	1st leg	2nd leg
Champions Path
Ballkani (Kosovo)	4–2	(Belarus) BATE Borisov	4–1	0–1
Žalgiris (Lithuania)	0–7	(Hungary) Ferencváros	0–4	0–3
Struga (North Macedonia)	0–2	(Iceland) Breiðablik	0–1	0–1
Farul Constanța (Romania)	2–3	(Finland) HJK	2–1	0–2
Astana (Kazakhstan)	2–1	(Albania) Partizani	1–0	1–1
Main Path
Levski Sofia (Bulgaria)	1–3	(Germany) Eintracht Frankfurt	1–1	0–2
Gent (Belgium)	4–1 (Note: Order of legs reversed after original draw.)	(Cyprus) APOEL	2–0	2–1
Spartak Trnava (Slovakia)	3–2	(Ukraine) Dnipro-1	1–1	2–1 (a.e.t.)
Sepsi OSK (Romania)	4–5	(Norway) Bodø/Glimt	2–2	2–3 (a.e.t.)
Tobol (Kazakhstan)	1–5	(Czech Republic) Viktoria Plzeň	1–2	0–3
Hibernian (Scotland)	0–8	(England) Aston Villa	0–5	0–3
Midtjylland (Denmark)	4–4 (5–6 p)	(Poland) Legia Warsaw	3–3	1–1 (a.e.t.)
Lille (France)	3–2	(Croatia) Rijeka	2–1	1–1 (a.e.t.)
Genk (Belgium)	2–2 (5–4 p)	(Turkey) Adana Demirspor	2–1	0–1 (a.e.t.)
Fenerbahçe (Turkey)	6–1	(Netherlands) Twente	5–1	1–0
Dynamo Kyiv (Ukraine)	2–4	(Turkey) Beşiktaş	2–3	0–1
AZ (Netherlands)	4–4 (6–5 p)	(Norway) Brann	1–1	3–3 (a.e.t.)
Rapid Wien (Austria)	1–2	(Italy) Fiorentina	1–0	0–2
Heart of Midlothian (Scotland)	1–6	(Greece) PAOK	1–2	0–4
Nordsjælland (Denmark)	6–0	(Serbia) Partizan	5–0	1–0
Osasuna (Spain)	3–4	(Belgium) Club Brugge	1–2	2–2
Maccabi Tel Aviv (Israel)	5–2	(Slovenia) Celje	4–1	1–1

=== Champions Path matches ===
24 August 2023
20:30

Ballkani (Kosovo)	4–1	(Belarus) BATE Borisov
Jashanica 31'; Tolaj 58', 66'; Thaqi 89'	Report	Laptev 10'

Fadil Vokrri Stadium, Pristina
Attendance: 7,564
Referee: Volen Chinkov (Bulgaria)
31 August 2023
20:00

BATE Borisov (Belarus)	1–0	(Kosovo) Ballkani
Kontsevoy 30'	Report

Mezőkövesdi Városi Stadion, Mezőkövesd, Hungary
Attendance: 0
Referee: Juri Frischer (Estonia)

Ballkani won 4–2 on aggregate.

24 August 2023
18:00

Žalgiris (Lithuania)	0–4	(Hungary) Ferencváros
	Report	Traoré 17', 84'; B. Varga 65' (pen.); Pešić 75'

LFF Stadium, Vilnius
Attendance: 3,151
Referee: Igor Stojchevski (North Macedonia)
31 August 2023
20:00

Ferencváros (Hungary)	3–0	(Lithuania) Žalgiris
Traoré 4', 48'; B. Varga 42' (pen.)	Report

Ferencváros Stadion, Budapest
Attendance: 12,073
Referee: Urs Schnyder (Switzerland)

Ferencváros won 7–0 on aggregate.

24 August 2023
17:00

Struga (North Macedonia)	0–1	(Iceland) Breiðablik
	Report	Gunnlaugsson 35'

SRC Biljanini Izvori, Ohrid (Note: Struga played their home match at the SRC Biljanini Izvori in Ohrid, instead of their regular stadium, the Gradska Plaža Stadium, in Struga, which did not meet UEFA requirements.)
Attendance: 1,203
Referee: Damian Sylwestrzak (Poland)
31 August 2023
18:45 (16:45 UTC+0)

Breiðablik (Iceland)	1–0	(North Macedonia) Struga
V. Einarsson 3'	Report

Kópavogsvöllur, Kópavogur
Attendance: 1,450
Referee: Daniel Schlager (Germany)

Breiðablik won 2–0 on aggregate.

24 August 2023
19:00 (20:00 UTC+3)

Farul Constanța (Romania)	2–1	(Finland) HJK
Rivaldinho 58'; Popescu 82'	Report	Toivio 50'

Stadionul Viitorul, Ovidiu
Attendance: 4,032
Referee: Philip Farrugia (Malta)
31 August 2023
18:00 (19:00 UTC+3)

HJK (Finland)	2–0	(Romania) Farul Constanța
Radulović 20', 70'	Report

Bolt Arena, Helsinki
Attendance: 6,671
Referee: Sebastian Gishamer (Austria)

HJK won 3–2 on aggregate.

24 August 2023
16:00 (20:00 UTC+6)

Astana (Kazakhstan)	1–0	(Albania) Partizani
Lončar 41'	Report

Astana Arena, Astana
Attendance: 18,634
Referee: Don Robertson (Scotland)
31 August 2023
20:00

Partizani (Albania)	1–1	(Kazakhstan) Astana
Bintsouka 25'	Report	Tomasov 46'

Elbasan Arena, Elbasan
Attendance: 6,000
Referee: Abdulkadir Bitigen (Turkey)

Astana won 2–1 on aggregate.

=== Main Path matches ===
24 August 2023
19:00 (20:00 UTC+3)

Levski Sofia (Bulgaria)	1–1	(Germany) Eintracht Frankfurt
Fadiga 90+5'	Report	Kolo Muani 6'

Vasil Levski National Stadium, Sofia (Note: Levski Sofia played their play-off round home match at the Vasil Levski National Stadium in Sofia, instead of their regular stadium, Stadion Georgi Asparuhov in Sofia.)
Attendance: 35,000
Referee: Adam Ladebäck (Sweden)
31 August 2023
20:30

Eintracht Frankfurt (Germany)	2–0	(Bulgaria) Levski Sofia
Ngankam 79'; Skhiri 86'	Report

Waldstadion, Frankfurt
Attendance: 46,000
Referee: Allard Lindhout (Netherlands)

Eintracht Frankfurt won 3–1 on aggregate.

24 August 2023
20:00

Gent (Belgium)	2–0	(Cyprus) APOEL
Fofana 77'; Hong Hyun-seok 90+2'	Report

Ghelamco Arena, Ghent
Attendance: 10,855
Referee: Sven Jablonski (Germany)
31 August 2023
19:00 (20:00 UTC+3)

APOEL (Cyprus)	1–2	(Belgium) Gent
Roef 90+5' (o.g.)	Report	Samoise 29'; Tissoudali 79'

GSP Stadium, Nicosia
Attendance: 14,100
Referee: Rohit Saggi (Norway)

Gent won 4–1 on aggregate.

23 August 2023
18:30

Spartak Trnava (Slovakia)	1–1	(Ukraine) Dnipro-1
Ofori 55'	Report	Pikhalyonok 67' (pen.)

Anton Malatinský Stadium, Trnava
Attendance: 16,566
Referee: Juxhin Xhaja (Albania)
31 August 2023
20:00

Dnipro-1 (Ukraine)	1–2 (a.e.t.)	(Slovakia) Spartak Trnava
Gorosito 61' (o.g.)	Report	Daniel 3'; Bukata 106'

Košická futbalová aréna, Košice, Slovakia
Attendance: 5,266
Referee: Balázs Berke (Hungary)

Spartak Trnava won 3–2 on aggregate.

24 August 2023
19:00 (20:00 UTC+3)

Sepsi OSK (Romania)	2–2	(Norway) Bodø/Glimt
Alimi 48' (pen.); Matei 81' (pen.)	Report	Moumbagna 19'; Berg 69'

Stadionul Sepsi Arena, Sfântu Gheorghe
Attendance: 7,710
Referee: Ruddy Buquet (France)
31 August 2023
18:00

Bodø/Glimt (Norway)	3–2 (a.e.t.)	(Romania) Sepsi OSK
Sørli 24'; Pellegrino 29', 100' (pen.)	Report	Alimi 42'; Varga 46'

Aspmyra Stadion, Bodø
Attendance: 6,799
Referee: Rob Harvey (Republic of Ireland)

Bodø/Glimt won 5–4 on aggregate.

24 August 2023
16:00 (20:00 UTC+6)

Tobol (Kazakhstan)	1–2	(Czech Republic) Viktoria Plzeň
Déblé 90+8' (pen.)	Report	Cadu 73'; Kalvach 90'

Central Stadium, Kostanay
Attendance: 8,420
Referee: Marian Alexandru Barbu (Romania)
31 August 2023
19:00

Viktoria Plzeň (Czech Republic)	3–0	(Kazakhstan) Tobol
Chorý 32'; Durosinmi 59'; Traoré 90+3'	Report

Doosan Arena, Plzeň
Attendance: 11,069
Referee: Matej Jug (Slovenia)

Viktoria Plzeň won 5–1 on aggregate.

23 August 2023
18:45 (17:45 UTC+1)

Hibernian (Scotland)	0–5	(England) Aston Villa
	Report	Watkins 17', 33', 48'; Bailey 42'; Douglas Luiz 74' (pen.)

Easter Road, Edinburgh
Attendance: 19,306
Referee: Ricardo de Burgos Bengoetxea (Spain)
31 August 2023
21:00 (20:00 UTC+1)

Aston Villa (England)	3–0	(Scotland) Hibernian
Durán 11'; Bailey 34'; Cash 61'	Report

Villa Park, Birmingham
Attendance: 39,467
Referee: Luca Pairetto (Italy)

Aston Villa won 8–0 on aggregate.

24 August 2023
20:00

Midtjylland (Denmark)	3–3	(Poland) Legia Warsaw
Juninho 16'; Franculino 34', 71'	Report	Gual 26'; Slisz 64'; Kramer 86'

MCH Arena, Herning
Attendance: 7,228
Referee: Mykola Balakin (Ukraine)
31 August 2023
21:00

Legia Warsaw (Poland)	1–1 (a.e.t.)	(Denmark) Midtjylland
Pekhart 53'	Report	Paulinho 71'
Penalties
Slisz (penalty scored); Muçi (penalty scored); Pankov (penalty scored); Kramer (penalty scored); Josué (penalty scored); Rosołek (penalty scored)	6–5	(penalty scored) Cho Gue-sung; (penalty scored) Juninho; (penalty scored) Rømer; (penalty scored) Sørensen; (penalty scored) Dyhr; (penalty missed) Gartenmann

Stadion Wojska Polskiego, Warsaw
Attendance: 27,312
Referee: Simone Sozza (Italy)

4–4 on aggregate; Legia Warsaw won 6–5 on penalties.

24 August 2023
20:00

Lille (France)	2–1	(Croatia) Rijeka
Zhegrova 43'; Yoro 89'	Report	Pašalić 24'

Stade Pierre-Mauroy, Villeneuve-d'Ascq
Attendance: 22,189
Referee: Atilla Karaoğlan (Turkey)
31 August 2023
20:15

Rijeka (Croatia)	1–1 (a.e.t.)	(France) Lille
Smolčić 58'	Report	David 109'

Stadion Rujevica, Rijeka
Attendance: 7,852
Referee: Luís Godinho (Portugal)

Lille won 3–2 on aggregate.

24 August 2023
20:00

Genk (Belgium)	2–1	(Turkey) Adana Demirspor
Arokodare 77'; Muñoz 90+3'	Report	Akbaba 47'

Cegeka Arena, Genk
Attendance: 9,460
Referee: António Nobre (Portugal)
31 August 2023
20:00 (21:00 UTC+3)

Adana Demirspor (Turkey)	1–0 (a.e.t.)	(Belgium) Genk
Ndiaye 45+10'	Report
Penalties
Niang (penalty scored); Stambouli (penalty scored); Belhanda (penalty missed); Sari (penalty scored); David (penalty scored)	4–5	(penalty scored) Heynen; (penalty scored) Bonsu Baah; (penalty scored) Ait El Hadj; (penalty scored) Ouattara; (penalty scored) Arokodare

New Adana Stadium, Adana
Attendance: 24,986
Referee: José Luis Munuera Montero (Spain)

2–2 on aggregate; Genk won 5–4 on penalties.

24 August 2023
19:00 (20:00 UTC+3)

Fenerbahçe (Turkey)	5–1	(Netherlands) Twente
Oosterwolde 33'; Szymański 60'; Kahveci 63', 74'; Tadić 90+3' (pen.)	Report	Ugalde 20'

Şükrü Saracoğlu Stadium, Istanbul
Attendance: 38,961
Referee: Andrew Madley (England)
31 August 2023
19:00

Twente (Netherlands)	0–1	(Turkey) Fenerbahçe
	Report	Džeko 72' (pen.)

De Grolsch Veste, Enschede
Attendance: 22,500
Referee: Fabio Maresca (Italy)

Fenerbahçe won 6–1 on aggregate.

24 August 2023
19:00 (20:00 UTC+3)

Dynamo Kyiv (Ukraine)	2–3	(Turkey) Beşiktaş
Shaparenko 60'; Voloshyn 66'	Report	Aboubakar 40' (pen.); Colley 64'; Zainutdinov 90+5'

Stadionul Rapid-Giulești, Bucharest, Romania
Attendance: 7,616
Referee: Darren England (England)
31 August 2023
20:00 (21:00 UTC+3)

Beşiktaş (Turkey)	1–0	(Ukraine) Dynamo Kyiv
Aboubakar 52'	Report

Beşiktaş Park, Istanbul
Attendance: 33,376
Referee: João Pinheiro (Portugal)

Beşiktaş won 4–2 on aggregate.

24 August 2023
20:45

AZ (Netherlands)	1–1	(Norway) Brann
Chatzidiakos 71'	Report	Castro 59'

AFAS Stadion, Alkmaar
Attendance: 10,888
Referee: Evangelos Manouchos (Greece)
31 August 2023
19:00

Brann (Norway)	3–3 (a.e.t.)	(Netherlands) AZ
Knudsen 45+1'; Soltvedt 66'; Sery Larsen 82'	Report	Lahdo 12'; Mijnans 29'; Van Bommel 50'
Penalties
Finne (penalty scored); Heltne Nilsen (penalty scored); Heggebø (penalty scored); Simba (penalty scored); Soltvedt (penalty scored); Børsting (penalty missed)	5–6	(penalty scored) D. de Wit; (penalty scored) Sugawara; (penalty scored) Odgaard; (penalty scored) Mijnans; (penalty scored) Mihailovic; (penalty scored) Penetra

Brann Stadion, Bergen
Attendance: 14,355
Referee: Gergő Bogár (Hungary)

4–4 on aggregate; AZ won 6–5 on penalties.

24 August 2023
19:00

Rapid Wien (Austria)	1–0	(Italy) Fiorentina
Grüll 35' (pen.)	Report

Weststadion, Vienna
Attendance: 23,000
Referee: Igor Pajac (Croatia)
31 August 2023
20:00

Fiorentina (Italy)	2–0	(Austria) Rapid Wien
González 59', 90' (pen.)	Report

Stadio Artemio Franchi, Florence
Attendance: 24,135
Referee: Novak Simović (Serbia)

Fiorentina won 2–1 on aggregate.

24 August 2023
20:45 (19:45 UTC+1)

Heart of Midlothian (Scotland)	1–2	(Greece) PAOK
Shankland 9' (pen.)	Report	Schwab 12' (pen.); A. Živković 75'

Tynecastle Park, Edinburgh
Attendance: 17,409
Referee: Andris Treimanis (Latvia)
31 August 2023
19:30 (20:30 UTC+3)

PAOK (Greece)	4–0	(Scotland) Heart of Midlothian
Taison 16', 71'; Brandon 23'; Konstantelias 57'	Report

Toumba Stadium, Thessaloniki
Attendance: 19,032
Referee: Guillermo Cuadra Fernández (Spain)

PAOK won 6–1 on aggregate.

24 August 2023
18:30

Nordsjælland (Denmark)	5–0	(Serbia) Partizan
Frese 11'; Ingvartsen 43' (pen.), 68' (pen.); Villadsen 73'; Ilić 88' (o.g.)	Report

Right to Dream Park, Farum
Attendance: 4,120
Referee: Yigal Frid (Israel)
31 August 2023
21:00

Partizan (Serbia)	0–1	(Denmark) Nordsjælland
	Report	Osman 30'

Partizan Stadium, Belgrade
Attendance: 2,916
Referee: Kevin Clancy (Scotland)

Nordsjælland won 6–0 on aggregate.

24 August 2023
20:30

Osasuna (Spain)	1–2	(Belgium) Club Brugge
Ávila 78'	Report	Skov Olsen 50'; De Cuyper 80'

El Sadar, Pamplona
Attendance: 21,985
Referee: Benoît Millot (France)
31 August 2023
20:30

Club Brugge (Belgium)	2–2	(Spain) Osasuna
Thiago 73'; Skov Olsen 76'	Report	Mojica 27'; Budimir 53'

Jan Breydel Stadium, Bruges
Attendance: 24,206
Referee: Daniel Stefański (Poland)

Club Brugge won 4–3 on aggregate.

24 August 2023
19:00 (20:00 UTC+3)

Maccabi Tel Aviv (Israel)	4–1	(Slovenia) Celje
Zahavi 22' (pen.), 51', 72'; Turgeman 90+2'	Report	Bajde 29'

Bloomfield Stadium, Tel Aviv
Attendance: 22,030
Referee: Manfredas Lukjančukas (Lithuania)
31 August 2023
20:00

Celje (Slovenia)	1–1	(Israel) Maccabi Tel Aviv
Matko 12'	Report	Kanichowsky 49'

Stadion Z'dežele, Celje
Attendance: 2,612
Referee: Jérémie Pignard (France)

Maccabi Tel Aviv won 5–2 on aggregate.
