= 2023–24 UEFA Europa Conference League qualifying (first and second round matches) =

European football competition

This page summarises the matches of the first and second qualifying rounds of 2023–24 UEFA Europa Conference League qualifying.

Times are CEST (UTC+2), as listed by UEFA (local times, if different, are in parentheses).

== First qualifying round ==
=== Summary ===
The first legs were played on 12 and 13 July, and the second legs were played on 18 and 20 July 2023.

The winners of the ties advanced to the Main Path second qualifying round. The losers were eliminated from European competitions for the season.

Team 1	Agg.	Team 2	1st leg	2nd leg
Sutjeska (Montenegro)	2–1	(San Marino) Cosmos	1–0	1–1
Domžale (Slovenia)	4–5 (Note: Order of legs reversed after original draw.)	(Malta) Balzan	1–4	3–1 (a.e.t.)
Vaduz (Liechtenstein)	2–3	(Belarus) Neman Grodno	1–2	1–1
Ararat-Armenia	5–5 (4–2 p)	(Albania) Egnatia	1–1	4–4 (a.e.t.)
Torpedo Kutaisi (Georgia (country))	3–3 (4–2 p)	(Bosnia and Herzegovina) Sarajevo	2–2	1–1 (a.e.t.)
Alashkert (Armenia)	7–2	(Montenegro) Arsenal Tivat	1–1	6–1
Željezničar (Bosnia and Herzegovina)	4–3	(Belarus) Dinamo Minsk	2–2	2–1
La Fiorita (San Marino)	1–2	(Moldova) Zimbru Chișinău	1–1	0–1
Maribor (Slovenia)	3–2	(Malta) Birkirkara	1–1	2–1
Tirana (Albania)	3–2	(Georgia (country)) Dinamo Batumi	1–1	2–1
FCB Magpies (Gibraltar)	1–3	(Republic of Ireland) Dundalk	0–0	1–3
Inter Club d'Escaldes (Andorra)	3–2	(Faroe Islands) Víkingur Gøta	2–1	1–1
Progrès Niederkorn (Luxembourg)	4–2	(Kosovo) Gjilani	2–2	2–0
Linfield (Northern Ireland)	3–2	(Albania) Vllaznia	3–1	0–1
KA (Iceland)	4–0	(Wales) Connah's Quay Nomads	2–0	2–0
Shkëndija (North Macedonia)	1–1 (2–3 p)	(Wales) Haverfordwest County	1–0	0–1 (a.e.t.)
Haka (Finland)	2–3	(Northern Ireland) Crusaders	2–2	0–1
HB (Faroe Islands)	0–1	(Republic of Ireland) Derry City	0–0	0–1
Riga (Latvia)	2–1	(Iceland) Víkingur Reykjavík	2–0	0–1
Žilina (Slovakia)	4–2	(Estonia) FCI Levadia	2–1	2–1
Pyunik (Armenia)	5–0	(Estonia) Narva Trans	2–0	3–0
Panevėžys (Lithuania)	3–2	(Moldova) Milsami Orhei	2–2	1–0
Tobol (Kazakhstan)	2–1	(Finland) Honka	2–1	0–0
DAC Dunajská Streda (Slovakia)	2–3	(Georgia (country)) Dila Gori	2–1	0–2
Makedonija GP (North Macedonia)	1–5	(Latvia) RFS	0–1	1–4
Dukagjini (Kosovo)	5–3	(Gibraltar) Europa	2–1	3–2
Penybont (Wales)	1–3	(Andorra) FC Santa Coloma	1–1	0–2 (a.e.t.)
Hegelmann (Lithuania)	0–5	(North Macedonia) Shkupi	0–5	0–0
F91 Dudelange (Luxembourg)	5–3	(Republic of Ireland) St Patrick's Athletic	2–1	3–2
B36 (Faroe Islands)	2–0	(Estonia) Paide Linnameeskond	0–0	2–0 (a.e.t.)
Gżira United (Malta)	3–3 (14–13 p)	(Northern Ireland) Glentoran	2–2	1–1 (a.e.t.)

=== Matches ===
13 July 2023
20:30

Sutjeska (Montenegro)	1–0	(San Marino) Cosmos
Marković 79'	Report

DG Arena, Podgorica (Note: Sutjeska played their home matches at the DG Arena in Podgorica, instead of their regular stadium, the Gradski stadion in Nikšić, which did not meet UEFA requirements.)
Attendance: 550
Referee: Jason Barcelo (Gibraltar)
20 July 2023
20:45

Cosmos (San Marino)	1–1	(Montenegro) Sutjeska
Nisi 41'	Report	Krstović 73'

San Marino Stadium, Serravalle
Attendance: 559
Referee: Dominik Stary (Czech Republic)

Sutjeska won 2–1 on aggregate.

13 July 2023
19:00

Domžale (Slovenia)	1–4	(Malta) Balzan
Kovačević 57' (pen.)	Report	Andrejić 8'; J. Grech 44' (pen.); Olawale 53'; Žerjal 90+4'

Domžale Sports Park, Domžale
Attendance: 1,215
Referee: Paul McLaughlin (Republic of Ireland)
18 July 2023
19:30

Balzan (Malta)	1–3 (a.e.t.)	(Slovenia) Domžale
Fausto 94'	Report	Nwankwo 44'; Pišek 63'; Kovačević 73'

Centenary Stadium, Ta' Qali
Attendance: 593
Referee: Visar Kastrati (Kosovo)

Balzan won 5–4 on aggregate.

13 July 2023
20:00

Vaduz (Liechtenstein)	1–2	(Belarus) Neman Grodno
Cavegn 22'	Report	Zubovich 29'; Shukurov 82'

Rheinpark Stadion, Vaduz
Attendance: 815
Referee: Jovan Kachevski (North Macedonia)
20 July 2023
20:00

Neman Grodno (Belarus)	1–1	(Liechtenstein) Vaduz
Savitsky 16' (pen.)	Report	Golliard 86'

Ménfői úti Stadion, Győr, Hungary (Note: Due to the country's involvement in the Russian invasion of Ukraine, Belarusian teams were required to play their home matches at neutral venues and behind closed doors until further notice.)
Attendance: 0
Referee: Nenad Minaković (Serbia)

Neman Grodno won 3–2 on aggregate.

13 July 2023
17:00 (19:00 UTC+4)

Ararat-Armenia	1–1	(Albania) Egnatia
Alemão 36'	Report	Dwamena 90+7'

Yerevan Football Academy Stadium, Yerevan
Attendance: 1,380
Referee: Trustin Farrugia Cann (Malta)
20 July 2023
20:00

Egnatia (Albania)	4–4 (a.e.t.)	Ararat-Armenia
Medeiros 4'; Kasa 36'; Dwamena 108', 120+4'	Report	Eza 17'; Castanheira 58'; Yenne 110'; Bueno 113'
Penalties
Dwamena (penalty scored); Zejnullai (penalty missed); Musta (penalty missed); Aleksi (penalty scored)	2–4	(penalty scored) Alemão; (penalty scored) Serobyan; (penalty scored) Castanheira; (penalty scored) Yenne

Elbasan Arena, Elbasan (Note: Egnatia played their home match at the Elbasan Arena in Elbasan, instead of their regular stadium, the Arena Egnatia in Rrogozhinë, which did not meet UEFA requirements.)
Attendance: 1,200
Referee: Dragomir Draganov (Bulgaria)

5–5 on aggregate; Ararat-Armenia won 4–2 on penalties.

13 July 2023
19:00 (21:00 UTC+4)

Torpedo Kutaisi (Georgia (country))	2–2	(Bosnia and Herzegovina) Sarajevo
Sandokhadze 44'; Bugridze 48'	Report	Oliveira 47'; Varešanović 52'

Ramaz Shengelia Stadium, Kutaisi
Attendance: 7,900
Referee: Snir Levy (Israel)
20 July 2023
21:00

Sarajevo (Bosnia and Herzegovina)	1–1 (a.e.t.)	(Georgia (country)) Torpedo Kutaisi
Ziljkić 12'	Report	Gigauri 90+1'
Penalties
Ikić (penalty missed); Čataković (penalty scored); Avramovski (penalty scored); Beganović (penalty missed)	2–4	(penalty scored) Caballero; (penalty scored) Shergelashvili; (penalty scored) Mandzhgaladze; (penalty scored) Kobuladze

Koševo City Stadium, Sarajevo
Attendance: 19,774
Referee: Ion Orlic (Moldova)

3–3 on aggregate; Torpedo Kutaisi won 4–2 on penalties.

13 July 2023
19:00 (21:00 UTC+4)

Alashkert (Armenia)	1–1	(Montenegro) Arsenal Tivat
Ustinov 66'	Report	Montenegro 23'

Urartu Stadium, Yerevan (Note: Alashkert played their first qualifying round home match at the Urartu Stadium in Yerevan, instead of their regular stadium, the Alashkert Stadium in Yerevan, which did not meet UEFA requirements.)
Attendance: 1,253
Referee: Ádám Farkas (Hungary)
20 July 2023
20:30

Arsenal Tivat (Montenegro)	1–6	(Armenia) Alashkert
Đorđević 58'	Report	Agdon 40', 45+1', 48'; Racines 74'; Grigoryan 90+2'; Mensah 90+5'

DG Arena, Podgorica (Note: Arsenal Tivat played their home match at the DG Arena in Podgorica, instead of their regular stadium, the Stadion u Parku in Tivat, which did not meet UEFA requirements.)
Attendance: 479
Referee: Oleksii Derevinskyi (Ukraine)

Alashkert won 7–2 on aggregate.

13 July 2023
20:30

Željezničar (Bosnia and Herzegovina)	2–2	(Belarus) Dinamo Minsk
Haračić 85', 90+1'	Report	Bakhar 41'; Morozov 50'

Stadion Grbavica, Sarajevo
Attendance: 13,050
Referee: Evangelos Manouchos (Greece)
20 July 2023
19:00 (21:00 UTC+4)

Dinamo Minsk (Belarus)	1–2	(Bosnia and Herzegovina) Željezničar
Sedko 64' (pen.)	Report	Sachywka 44' (o.g.); Krpić 78'

Azersun Arena, Baku, Azerbaijan
Attendance: 0
Referee: Michal Ocenáš (Slovakia)

Željezničar won 4–3 on aggregate.

13 July 2023
20:45

La Fiorita (San Marino)	1–1	(Moldova) Zimbru Chișinău
Casolla 34'	Report	Căruntu 64'

San Marino Stadium, Serravalle (Note: La Fiorita played their home match at the San Marino Stadium in Serravalle, instead of their regular stadium, the Stadio Igor Crescentini in Montegiardino, which did not meet UEFA requirements.)
Attendance: 521
Referee: Luís Teixeira (Andorra)
20 July 2023
19:00 (20:00 UTC+3)

Zimbru Chișinău (Moldova)	1–0	(San Marino) La Fiorita
Dedechko 35'	Report

Zimbru Stadium, Chișinău
Attendance: 4,200
Referee: Mervan Bejtullahu (Kosovo)

Zimbru Chișinău won 2–1 on aggregate.

13 July 2023
21:00

Maribor (Slovenia)	1–1	(Malta) Birkirkara
Brnić 67' (pen.)	Report	Mbong 31'

Ljudski vrt, Maribor
Attendance: 5,600
Referee: Mohammed Al-Emara (Finland)
20 July 2023
17:00

Birkirkara (Malta)	1–2	(Slovenia) Maribor
Yankam 19' (pen.)	Report	Jakupović 80'; Skuka 88'

Centenary Stadium, Ta' Qali
Attendance: 868
Referee: Martin Dohál (Slovakia)

Maribor won 3–2 on aggregate.

13 July 2023
20:00

Tirana (Albania)	1–1	(Georgia (country)) Dinamo Batumi
Lushkja 90+3'	Report	Flamarion 66'

Arena Kombëtare, Tirana
Attendance: 5,000
Referee: Robert Jones (England)
20 July 2023
19:00 (21:00 UTC+4)

Dinamo Batumi (Georgia (country))	1–2	(Albania) Tirana
Kapanadze 90'	Report	Lushkja 28'; Deliu 77'

Adjarabet Arena, Batumi
Attendance: 17,691
Referee: Fabio Maresca (Italy)

Tirana won 3–2 on aggregate.

13 July 2023
18:00

FCB Magpies (Gibraltar)	0–0	(Republic of Ireland) Dundalk
	Report

Victoria Stadium, Gibraltar
Attendance: 847
Referee: Mohammad Usman Aslam (Norway)
20 July 2023
20:45 (19:45 UTC+1)

Dundalk (Republic of Ireland)	3–1	(Gibraltar) FCB Magpies
Hoban 3'; Martin 48'; dos Santos 83' (o.g.)	Report	Joe 33'

Oriel Park, Dundalk
Attendance: 2,900
Referee: Patrik Kolarić (Croatia)

Dundalk won 3–1 on aggregate.

13 July 2023
17:00

Inter Club d'Escaldes (Andorra)	2–1	(Faroe Islands) Víkingur Gøta
Feher 28'; El Haddadi 45+1'	Report	Vatnhamar 59' (pen.)

Estadi Comunal, Andorra la Vella
Attendance: 197
Referee: Jérémy Muller (Luxembourg)
20 July 2023
20:00 (19:00 UTC+1)

Víkingur Gøta (Faroe Islands)	1–1	(Andorra) Inter Club d'Escaldes
Vatnhamar 76' (pen.)	Report	Andreu 65'

Við Djúpumýrar, Klaksvík (Note: Víkingur played their home match at the Við Djúpumýrar in Klaksvík, instead of their regular stadium, the Sarpugerði in Norðragøta, which did not meet UEFA requirements.)
Attendance: 678
Referee: Jan Machálek (Czech Republic)

Inter Club d'Escaldes won 3–2 on aggregate.

13 July 2023
19:30

Progrès Niederkorn (Luxembourg)	2–2	(Kosovo) Gjilani
De Almeida 11'; Natami 62'	Report	Ramadani 48' (pen.), 66' (pen.)

Stade Municipal, Differdange (Note: Progrès Niederkorn played their home matches at the Stade Municipal in Differdange, instead of their regular stadium, the Stade Jos Haupert in Niederkorn, which did not meet UEFA requirements.)
Attendance: 1,900
Referee: Oliver Reitala (Finland)
20 July 2023
20:00

Gjilani (Kosovo)	0–2	(Luxembourg) Progrès Niederkorn
	Report	Mazure 65'; Jarmouni 90+1'

Fadil Vokrri Stadium, Pristina (Note: Gjilani played their home match at the Fadil Vokrri Stadium in Pristina, instead of their regular stadium, the Gjilan City Stadium in Gjilan, which did not meet UEFA requirements.)
Attendance: 2,000
Referee: Yasar Kemal Ugurlu (Turkey)

Progrès Niederkorn won 4–2 on aggregate.

13 July 2023
20:45 (19:45 UTC+1)

Linfield (Northern Ireland)	3–1	(Albania) Vllaznia
McKee 57', 68'; Scott 76'	Report	Jurić 89'

Windsor Park, Belfast
Attendance: 4,646
Referee: Ivo Torres (Luxembourg)
20 July 2023
20:45

Vllaznia (Albania)	1–0	(Northern Ireland) Linfield
Balaj 54'	Report

Loro Boriçi Stadium, Shkodër
Attendance: 6,000
Referee: Rauf Jabarov (Azerbaijan)

Linfield won 3–2 on aggregate.

13 July 2023
20:00 (18:00 UTC+0)

KA (Iceland)	2–0	(Wales) Connah's Quay Nomads
H. M. Steingrímsson 60'; Hafsteinsson 83'	Report

Framvöllur, Reykjavík (Note: KA played their home matches at the Framvöllur in Reykjavík, instead of their regular stadium, the Greifavöllurinn in Akureyri, which did not meet UEFA requirements.)
Attendance: 930
Referee: Antoine Paul Chiaramonti (Andorra)
20 July 2023
20:00 (19:00 UTC+1)

Connah's Quay Nomads (Wales)	0–2	(Iceland) KA
	Report	Hafsteinsson 16'; E. Aðalsteinsson 77'

Park Hall, Oswestry, England (Note: Connah's Quay Nomads played their home match at Park Hall in Oswestry, England, instead of their regular stadium, Deeside Stadium, Connah's Quay, which did not meet UEFA requirements.)
Attendance: 522
Referee: Gustavo Correia (Portugal)

KA won 4–0 on aggregate.

13 July 2023
20:00

Shkëndija (North Macedonia)	1–0	(Wales) Haverfordwest County
Shala 47'	Report

Toše Proeski Arena, Skopje (Note: Shkëndija played their home match at the Toše Proeski Arena in Skopje, instead of their regular stadium, the Ecolog Arena in Tetovo, which did not meet UEFA requirements.)
Attendance: 2,500
Referee: Joey Kooij (Netherlands)
20 July 2023
20:45 (19:45 UTC+1)

Haverfordwest County (Wales)	1–0 (a.e.t.)	(North Macedonia) Shkëndija
Jenkins 89'	Report
Penalties
Hawkins (penalty missed); Richards (penalty scored); Wilson (penalty scored); Whitmore (penalty scored); Fawcett (penalty missed)	3–2	(penalty scored) Krasniqi; (penalty missed) Çinari; (penalty missed) Adili; (penalty scored) Qaka; (penalty missed) Ramadani

Cardiff City Stadium, Cardiff (Note: Haverfordwest County played their home matches at the Cardiff City Stadium in Cardiff, instead of their regular stadium, the Bridge Meadow Stadium in Haverfordwest, which did not meet UEFA requirements.)
Attendance: 1,716
Referee: Ivar Orri Kristjansson (Iceland)

1–1 on aggregate; Haverfordwest County won 3–2 on penalties.

13 July 2023
18:00 (19:00 UTC+3)

Haka (Finland)	2–2	(Northern Ireland) Crusaders
Rogerson 33' (pen.); Fofana 36'	Report	Forsythe 22'; Clarke 68'

Tehtaan kenttä, Valkeakoski
Attendance: 2,146
Referee: Sivert Øksnes Amland (Norway)
20 July 2023
21:00 (20:00 UTC+1)

Crusaders (Northern Ireland)	1–0	(Finland) Haka
Heatley 73'	Report

Seaview, Belfast
Attendance: 2,189
Referee: Jan Petrik (Czech Republic)

Crusaders won 3–2 on aggregate.

13 July 2023
20:00 (19:00 UTC+1)

HB (Faroe Islands)	0–0	(Republic of Ireland) Derry City
	Report

Tórsvøllur, Tórshavn
Attendance: 600
Referee: Kristoffer Hagenes (Norway)
20 July 2023
20:45 (19:45 UTC+1)

Derry City (Republic of Ireland)	1–0	(Faroe Islands) HB
Diallo 23'	Report

Ryan McBride Brandywell Stadium, Derry
Attendance: 3,700
Referee: Tomás Klíma (Czech Republic)

Derry City won 1–0 on aggregate.

13 July 2023
19:00 (20:00 UTC+3)

Riga (Latvia)	2–0	(Iceland) Víkingur Reykjavík
Aurélio 31'; Regža 52'	Report

Skonto Stadium, Riga
Attendance: 5,315
Referee: Tom Owen (Wales)
20 July 2023
20:45 (18:45 UTC+0)

Víkingur Reykjavík (Iceland)	1–0	(Latvia) Riga
Guðjónsson 83'	Report

Víkingsvöllur, Reykjavík
Attendance: 1,050
Referee: Alessandro Dudic (Switzerland)

Riga won 2–1 on aggregate.

13 July 2023
17:30

Žilina (Slovakia)	2–1	(Estonia) FCI Levadia
Ďuriš 7'; Myslovič 90+3' (pen.)	Report	Agyiri 51'

Štadión pod Dubňom, Žilina
Attendance: 3,579
Referee: David Dickinson (Scotland)
20 July 2023
18:45 (19:45 UTC+3)

FCI Levadia (Estonia)	1–2	(Slovakia) Žilina
Agyiri 10'	Report	Rusnák 3'; Stojchevski 45+2'

Lilleküla Stadium, Tallinn
Attendance: 2,495
Referee: Miloš Savović (Montenegro)

Žilina won 4–2 on aggregate.

13 July 2023
17:00 (19:00 UTC+4)

Pyunik (Armenia)	2–0	(Estonia) Narva Trans
Juričić 65'; Kraizmer 88' (o.g.)	Report

Abovyan City Stadium, Abovyan (Note: Pyunik played their home match at the Abovyan City Stadium in Abovyan, instead of their regular stadium, the Vazgen Sargsyan Republican Stadium in Yerevan.)
Attendance: 2,500
Referee: Kyriakos Athanasiou (Cyprus)
20 July 2023
17:30 (18:30 UTC+3)

Narva Trans (Estonia)	0–3	(Armenia) Pyunik
	Report	Dashyan 8'; Juninho 14'; Juričić 66'

Rakvere Linnastaadion, Rakvere (Note: Narva Trans played their home match at the Rakvere Linnastaadion in Rakvere, instead of their regular stadium, the Narva Kreenholm Stadium in Narva, which did not meet UEFA requirements.)
Attendance: 394
Referee: Andrew Davey (Northern Ireland)

Pyunik won 5–0 on aggregate.

13 July 2023
18:00 (19:00 UTC+3)

Panevėžys (Lithuania)	2–2	(Moldova) Milsami Orhei
Čađenović 17' (pen.); Smith 48'	Report	Gînsari 51' (pen.), 67'

Sūduva Stadium, Marijampolė (Note: Panevėžys played their home matches at the Sūduva Stadium in Marijampolė, instead of their regular stadium, the Aukštaitija Stadium in Panevėžys, which did not meet UEFA requirements.)
Attendance: 672
Referee: Antoni Bandić (Bosnia and Herzegovina)
20 July 2023
18:00 (19:00 UTC+3)

Milsami Orhei (Moldova)	0–1	(Lithuania) Panevėžys
	Report	Keita 56'

CSR Orhei, Orhei
Attendance: 3,160
Referee: Erkan Özdamar (Turkey)

Panevėžys won 3–2 on aggregate.

13 July 2023
16:00 (20:00 UTC+6)

Tobol (Kazakhstan)	2–1	(Finland) Honka
Vukadinović 62', 75'	Report	Kaufmann 39'

Central Stadium, Kostanay
Attendance: 7,543
Referee: Dzmitry Dzmitryieu (Belarus)
20 July 2023
18:00 (19:00 UTC+3)

Honka (Finland)	0–0	(Kazakhstan) Tobol
	Report

Myyrmäen jalkapallostadion, Vantaa (Note: Honka played their home match at the Myyrmäen jalkapallostadion in Vantaa, instead of their regular stadium, the Tapiolan urheilupuisto in Espoo, which did not meet UEFA requirements.)
Attendance: 1,611
Referee: Lazar Lukić (Serbia)

Tobol won 2–1 on aggregate.

13 July 2023
19:30

DAC Dunajská Streda (Slovakia)	2–1	(Georgia (country)) Dila Gori
Trusa 33'; Ramadan 36'	Report	Kovtalyuk 43'

MOL Aréna, Dunajská Streda
Attendance: 6,269
Referee: Jarred Gillett (England)
20 July 2023
19:00 (21:00 UTC+4)

Dila Gori (Georgia (country))	2–0	(Slovakia) DAC Dunajská Streda
Gale 33'; Alef 78'	Report

Tengiz Burjanadze Stadium, Gori
Attendance: 3,680
Referee: Ante Čulina (Croatia)

Dila Gori won 3–2 on aggregate.

13 July 2023
17:30

Makedonija GP (North Macedonia)	0–1	(Latvia) RFS
	Report	Ilić 34'

Petar Miloševski Training Centre, Skopje (Note: Makedonija GP played their home match at the Petar Miloševski Training Centre in Skopje, instead of their regular stadium, the Gjorče Petrov Stadium in Skopje, which did not meet UEFA requirements.)
Attendance: 400
Referee: Mikkel Redder (Denmark)
20 July 2023
17:30 (18:30 UTC+3)

RFS (Latvia)	4–1	(North Macedonia) Makedonija GP
Kouadio 43', 58'; Panić 68'; Ilić 86'	Report	Stojkoski 50'

Sloka Stadium, Jūrmala (Note: RFS played their home matches at the Sloka Stadium in Jūrmala, instead of their regular stadium, the LNK Sporta Parks in Riga, which did not meet UEFA requirements.)
Attendance: 1,754
Referee: Urs Schnyder (Switzerland)

RFS won 5–1 on aggregate.

13 July 2023
19:00

Dukagjini (Kosovo)	2–1	(Gibraltar) Europa
Shabani 30'; Zulfiu 90+6'	Report	Jesús Pozo 45+6'

Fadil Vokrri Stadium, Pristina (Note: Dukagjini played their home matches at the Fadil Vokrri Stadium in Pristina, instead of their regular stadium, the 18 June Stadium in Klina, which did not meet UEFA requirements.)
Attendance: 3,000
Referee: Jóhan Hendrik Ellefsen (Faroe Islands)
20 July 2023
17:00

Europa (Gibraltar)	2–3	(Kosovo) Dukagjini
Quintana 38' (pen.); Vera 87'	Report	Zulfiu 23' (pen.), 79'; Shala 47'

Victoria Stadium, Gibraltar
Attendance: 350
Referee: Neil Doyle (Republic of Ireland)

Dukagjini won 5–3 on aggregate.

13 July 2023
19:30 (18:30 UTC+1)

Penybont (Wales)	1–1	(Andorra) FC Santa Coloma
Venables 66'	Report	Mourelo 36'

Brewery Field, Bridgend (Note: Penybont played their home match at Brewery Field in Bridgend, instead of their regular stadium, Bryntirion Park, Bridgend, which did not meet UEFA requirements.)
Attendance: 1,410
Referee: Andreas Argyrou (Cyprus)
20 July 2023
17:00

FC Santa Coloma (Andorra)	2–0 (a.e.t.)	(Wales) Penybont
Garrido 105+1'; Novoa 119'	Report

Estadi Comunal, Andorra la Vella
Attendance: 363
Referee: Roman Jitari (Moldova)

FC Santa Coloma won 3–1 on aggregate.

13 July 2023
19:00 (20:00 UTC+3)

Hegelmann (Lithuania)	0–5	(North Macedonia) Shkupi
	Report	Cephas 11', 45+1', 56', 62'; Queven 23'

Darius and Girėnas Stadium, Kaunas (Note: Hegelmann played their home match at the Darius and Girėnas Stadium in Kaunas, instead of their regular stadium, the LFF Kaunas Training Centre in Kaunas, which did not meet UEFA requirements.)
Attendance: 2,054
Referee: Menelaos Antoniou (Cyprus)
20 July 2023
21:00

Shkupi (North Macedonia)	0–0	(Lithuania) Hegelmann
	Report

Toše Proeski Arena, Skopje (Note: Shkupi played their home matches at the Toše Proeski Arena in Skopje, instead of their regular stadium, the Čair Stadium in Skopje, which did not meet UEFA requirements.)
Attendance: 1,260
Referee: Tim Marshall (Northern Ireland)

Shkupi won 5–0 on aggregate.

12 July 2023
19:30

F91 Dudelange (Luxembourg)	2–1	(Republic of Ireland) St Patrick's Athletic
Van Lingen 24'; Roemer 61'	Report	Doyle 90+3'

Stade Jos Nosbaum, Dudelange
Attendance: 1,469
Referee: Radoslav Gidzhenov (Bulgaria)
20 July 2023
20:45 (19:45 UTC+1)

St Patrick's Athletic (Republic of Ireland)	2–3	(Luxembourg) F91 Dudelange
Desprez 22' (o.g.); Murphy 60'	Report	Van Lingen 9', 67', 90+5'

Richmond Park, Dublin
Attendance: 2,434
Referee: Edgars Maļcevs (Latvia)

F91 Dudelange won 5–3 on aggregate.

12 July 2023
20:00 (19:00 UTC+1)

B36 (Faroe Islands)	0–0	(Estonia) Paide Linnameeskond
	Report

Gundadalur, Tórshavn
Attendance: 645
Referee: Lothar D'hondt (Belgium)
20 July 2023
17:30 (18:30 UTC+3)

Paide Linnameeskond (Estonia)	0–2 (a.e.t.)	(Faroe Islands) B36
	Report	Nielsen 92'; Przybylski 95'

Kadriorg Stadium, Tallinn (Note: Paide Linnameeskond played their home match at the Kadriorg Stadium in Tallinn, instead of their regular stadium, the Paide linnastaadion in Paide, which did not meet UEFA requirements.)
Attendance: 1,391
Referee: Vitaliy Romanov (Ukraine)

B36 won 2–0 on aggregate.

13 July 2023
19:00

Gżira United (Malta)	2–2	(Northern Ireland) Glentoran
Wilkson 29'; B. Borg 40'	Report	Ogedi-Uzokwe 9'; Marshall 48'

Centenary Stadium, Ta' Qali
Attendance: 458
Referee: Stefan Ebner (Austria)
20 July 2023
20:30 (19:30 UTC+1)

Glentoran (Northern Ireland)	1–1 (a.e.t.)	(Malta) Gżira United
Burns 90+13'	Report	Lucas Macula 67'
Penalties
J. Donnelly (penalty scored); McCullough (penalty scored); Boyd (penalty scored); Jenkins (penalty scored); Burns (penalty scored); Walsh (penalty scored); Marshall (penalty scored); Sule (penalty scored); Wilson (penalty scored); Singleton (penalty scored); McCarey (penalty scored); J. Donnelly (penalty scored); McCullough (penalty scored); Boyd (penalty missed)	13–14	(penalty scored) Wilkson; (penalty scored) Mendoza; (penalty scored) Scerri; (penalty scored) Essaka; (penalty scored) B. Borg; (penalty scored) Chabá; (penalty scored) Romero; (penalty scored) Thiaguinho; (penalty scored) A. Borg; (penalty scored) Dias; (penalty scored) Cassar; (penalty scored) Wilkson; (penalty scored) Mendoza; (penalty scored) Scerri

The Oval, Belfast
Attendance: 3,200
Referee: Sigurd Kringstad (Norway)

3–3 on aggregate; Gżira United won 14–13 on penalties.

== Second qualifying round ==
=== Summary ===
The first legs were played on 25, 26 and 27 July, and the second legs were played on 1, 2 and 3 August 2023.

The winners of the ties advanced to the third qualifying round of their respective path. The losers were eliminated from European competitions for the season.

Team 1	Agg.	Team 2	1st leg	2nd leg
Champions Path
Lincoln Red Imps (Gibraltar)	Bye	N/A	—	—
Flora (Estonia)	Bye	N/A	—	—
Tre Penne (San Marino)	0–10	(Latvia) Valmiera	0–3	0–7
Ferencváros (Hungary)	6–0	(Republic of Ireland) Shamrock Rovers	4–0	2–0
The New Saints (Wales)	3–4	(Luxembourg) Swift Hesperange	1–1	2–3
Atlètic Club d'Escaldes (Andorra)	1–5	(Albania) Partizani	0–1	1–4
Hamrun Spartans (Malta)	3–1	(Georgia (country)) Dinamo Tbilisi	2–1	1–0
Farul Constanța (Romania)	6–4	(Armenia) Urartu	3–2	3–2
Struga (North Macedonia)	5–3	(Montenegro) Budućnost Podgorica	1–0	4–3
Ballkani (Kosovo)	7–1	(Northern Ireland) Larne	3–0	4–1
Main Path
Dukagjini (Kosovo)	1–7 (Note: Order of legs reversed after original draw.)	(Croatia) Rijeka	0–1	1–6
Gżira United (Malta)	3–2	(Luxembourg) F91 Dudelange	2–0	1–2
Djurgårdens IF (Sweden)	2–3	(Switzerland) Luzern	1–2	1–1
Celje (Slovenia)	4–4 (4–2 p)	(Portugal) Vitória de Guimarães	3–4	1–0 (a.e.t.)
Sutjeska (Montenegro)	2–3	(Andorra) FC Santa Coloma	2–0	0–3 (a.e.t.)
Hapoel Be'er Sheva (Israel)	2–1	(Lithuania) Panevėžys	1–0	1–1
Vorskla Poltava (Ukraine)	3–4	(Georgia (country)) Dila Gori	2–1	1–3
CFR Cluj (Romania)	2–3	(Turkey) Adana Demirspor	1–1	1–2
Ordabasy (Kazakhstan)	4–5	(Poland) Legia Warsaw	2–2	2–3
RFS (Latvia)	1–4	(Azerbaijan) Sabah	0–2	1–2
Beşiktaş (Turkey)	5–1	(Albania) Tirana	3–1	2–0
Željezničar (Bosnia and Herzegovina)	2–4	(Azerbaijan) Neftçi	2–2	0–2
APOEL (Cyprus)	4–2	(Serbia) Vojvodina	2–1	2–1
CSKA 1948 (Bulgaria)	2–4	(Romania) FCSB	0–1	2–3
Alashkert (Armenia)	2–2 (1–3 p)	(Hungary) Debrecen	0–1	2–1 (a.e.t.)
Lech Poznań (Poland)	5–2	(Lithuania) Kauno Žalgiris	3–1	2–1
Kalmar FF (Sweden)	2–4	(Armenia) Pyunik	1–2	1–2
Bodø/Glimt (Norway)	7–2	(Czech Republic) Bohemians 1905	3–0	4–2
Auda (Latvia)	2–5	(Slovakia) Spartak Trnava	1–1	1–4
Osijek (Croatia)	3–1	(Hungary) Zalaegerszeg	1–0	2–1
Twente (Netherlands)	2–1	(Sweden) Hammarby IF	1–0	1–1 (a.e.t.)
KA (Iceland)	5–3	(Republic of Ireland) Dundalk	3–1	2–2
Club Brugge (Belgium)	3–1	(Denmark) AGF	3–0	0–1
Crusaders (Northern Ireland)	4–5	(Norway) Rosenborg	2–2	2–3 (a.e.t.)
Inter Club d'Escaldes (Andorra)	3–7	(Scotland) Hibernian	2–1	1–6
Viktoria Plzeň (Czech Republic)	2–1	(Kosovo) Drita	0–0	2–1
B36 (Faroe Islands)	3–2	(Wales) Haverfordwest County	2–1	1–1 (a.e.t.)
Basel (Switzerland)	3–4	(Kazakhstan) Tobol	1–3	2–1
Differdange 03 (Luxembourg)	4–5	(Slovenia) Maribor	1–1	3–4 (a.e.t.)
Austria Wien	3–1	(Bosnia and Herzegovina) Borac Banja Luka	1–0	2–1
CSKA Sofia (Bulgaria)	0–6	(Romania) Sepsi OSK	0–2	0–4
Ararat-Armenia	1–2	(Greece) Aris	1–1	0–1
Maccabi Tel Aviv (Israel)	5–0	(Moldova) Petrocub Hîncești	3–0	2–0
Torpedo-BelAZ Zhodino (Belarus)	3–4	(Cyprus) AEK Larnaca	2–3	1–1
Torpedo Kutaisi (Georgia (country))	3–5	(Kazakhstan) Aktobe	1–4	2–1
Midtjylland (Denmark)	3–2	(Luxembourg) Progrès Niederkorn	2–0	1–2 (a.e.t.)
Derry City (Republic of Ireland)	5–4	(Finland) KuPS	2–1	3–3
Gent (Belgium)	10–3	(Slovakia) Žilina	5–1	5–2
Kecskemét (Hungary)	3–4	(Latvia) Riga	2–1	1–3 (a.e.t.)
Linfield (Northern Ireland)	4–8	(Poland) Pogoń Szczecin	2–5	2–3
PAOK (Greece)	4–1	(Israel) Beitar Jerusalem	0–0	4–1
Neman Grodno (Belarus)	2–0	(Malta) Balzan	2–0	0–0
Fenerbahçe (Turkey)	9–0	(Moldova) Zimbru Chișinău	5–0	4–0
Gabala (Azerbaijan)	3–7	(Cyprus) Omonia	2–3	1–4
Shkupi (North Macedonia)	0–3	(Bulgaria) Levski Sofia	0–2	0–1

=== Champions Path matches ===
25 July 2023
20:45

Tre Penne (San Marino)	0–3	(Latvia) Valmiera
	Report	Mena 33', 54'; Ndoye 47'

Stadio Olimpico di San Marino, Serravalle (Note: Tre Penne played their home match at the Stadio Olimpico di San Marino in Serravalle, instead of their regular stadium, the Stadio Fonte dell'Ovo in San Marino, which did not meet UEFA requirements.)
Attendance: 303
Referee: Miloš Bošković (Montenegro)
1 August 2023
17:00 (18:00 UTC+3)

Valmiera (Latvia)	7–0	(San Marino) Tre Penne
Toņiševs 3', 68'; Nigretti 6' (o.g.); Veips 9'; Kayramani 12'; Ndoye 73'; Jaunzems 90+3'	Report

Jānis Daliņš Stadium, Valmiera
Attendance: 978
Referee: Tomáš Klíma (Czech Republic)

Valmiera won 10–0 on aggregate.

27 July 2023
19:00

Ferencváros (Hungary)	4–0	(Republic of Ireland) Shamrock Rovers
Sigér 16'; Ramírez 32'; Traoré 47'; B. Varga 74'	Report

Ferencváros Stadion, Budapest
Attendance: 10,735
Referee: Ashot Ghaltakhchyan (Armenia)
3 August 2023
21:00 (20:00 UTC+1)

Shamrock Rovers (Republic of Ireland)	0–2	(Hungary) Ferencváros
	Report	Zachariassen 31'; Mmaee 90'

Tallaght Stadium, Tallaght
Attendance: 3,737
Referee: Tomasz Musiał (Poland)

Ferencváros won 6–0 on aggregate.

25 July 2023
20:00 (19:00 UTC+1)

The New Saints (Wales)	1–1	(Luxembourg) Swift Hesperange
Holden 74'	Report	Martins 14'

Park Hall, Oswestry
Attendance: 789
Referee: Jasper Vergoote (Belgium)
1 August 2023
20:00

Swift Hesperange (Luxembourg)	3–2	(Wales) The New Saints
Stolz 2'; Alioui 62'; Martins 66'	Report	McManus 22' (pen.), 71' (pen.)

Stade de Luxembourg, Luxembourg City (Note: Swift Hesperange played their home match at the Stade de Luxembourg in Luxembourg City, instead of their regular stadium, Stade Alphonse Theis, in Hesperange, which did not meet UEFA requirements.)
Attendance: 1,541
Referee: Ishmael Barbara (Malta)

Swift Hesperange won 4–3 on aggregate.

25 July 2023
17:00

Atlètic Club d'Escaldes (Andorra)	0–1	(Albania) Partizani
	Report	Mba 53'

Estadi Comunal, Andorra la Vella
Attendance: 155
Referee: Robert Ian Jenkins (Wales)
1 August 2023
20:45

Partizani (Albania)	4–1	(Andorra) Atlètic Club d'Escaldes
Cara 28', 45+1'; Rrapaj 64'; Grezda 90+5'	Report	Lopez 90+4' (pen.)

Arena Kombëtare, Tirana
Attendance: 2,600
Referee: Zaven Hovhannisyan (Armenia)

Partizani won 5–1 on aggregate.

25 July 2023
20:00

Hamrun Spartans (Malta)	2–1	(Georgia (country)) Dinamo Tbilisi
Mbong 81', 90+8'	Report	Marušić 60'

Centenary Stadium, Ta' Qali (Note: Hamrun Spartans played their home match at the Centenary Stadium in Ta' Qali, instead of their regular stadium, Victor Tedesco Stadium, in Hamrun, which did not meet UEFA requirements.)
Attendance: 1,319
Referee: Miloš Gigovic (Bosnia and Herzegovina)
3 August 2023
18:00 (20:00 UTC+4)

Dinamo Tbilisi (Georgia (country))	0–1	(Malta) Hamrun Spartans
	Report	Đuranović 45+2'

Boris Paichadze Dinamo Arena, Tbilisi
Attendance: 2,500
Referee: Viktor Shimusik (Belarus)

Hamrun Spartans won 3–1 on aggregate.

27 July 2023
19:30 (20:30 UTC+3)

Farul Constanța (Romania)	3–2	(Armenia) Urartu
Băluță 27'; Mazilu 45+4'; Larie 90+5'	Report	Maksimenko 23'; Zotko 38'

Stadionul Viitorul, Ovidiu
Attendance: 3,912
Referee: Martin Dohál (Slovakia)
3 August 2023
18:00 (20:00 UTC+4)

Urartu (Armenia)	2–3	(Romania) Farul Constanța
Antwi 11'; Sabua 47'	Report	Nedelcu 53'; Alibec 57', 90+1'

Urartu Stadium, Yerevan
Attendance: 3,500
Referee: Tom Owen (Wales)

Farul Constanța won 6–4 on aggregate.

26 July 2023
17:00

Struga (North Macedonia)	1–0	(Montenegro) Budućnost Podgorica
Ibraimi 30'	Report

SRC Biljanini Izvori, Ohrid (Note: Struga played their home match at the SRC Biljanini Izvori in Ohrid, instead of their regular stadium, the Gradska Plaža Stadium, in Struga, which did not meet UEFA requirements.)
Attendance: 700
Referee: Artyom Kuchin (Kazakhstan)
1 August 2023
21:00

Budućnost Podgorica (Montenegro)	3–4	(North Macedonia) Struga
Đuričković 7'; Va. Adžić 45+9'; Sekulović 82'	Report	Radeski 11', 45+3', 74'; Ibraimi 66'

Podgorica City Stadium, Podgorica
Attendance: 3,200
Referee: David Munro (Scotland)

Struga won 5–3 on aggregate.

25 July 2023
20:45

Ballkani (Kosovo)	3–0	(Northern Ireland) Larne
Rrahmani 26' (pen.); Kryeziu 33'; Gripshi 67'	Report

Fadil Vokrri Stadium, Pristina (Note: Ballkani played their home match at the Fadil Vokrri Stadium in Pristina, instead of their regular stadium, the Theranda City Stadium, in Suva Reka, which did not meet UEFA requirements.)
Attendance: 2,500
Referee: Denys Shurman (Ukraine)
3 August 2023
20:30 (19:30 UTC+1)

Larne (Northern Ireland)	1–4	(Kosovo) Ballkani
Bonis 60' (pen.)	Report	Gripshi 27', 36'; Rrahmani 46'; Kryeziu 66'

Solitude, Belfast (Note: Larne played their home match at the Solitude in Belfast, instead of their regular stadium, the Inver Park in Larne, which did not meet UEFA requirements.)
Attendance: 1,301
Referee: Vilhjalmur Thorarinsson (Iceland)

Ballkani won 7–1 on aggregate.

=== Main Path matches ===
27 July 2023
20:00

Dukagjini (Kosovo)	0–1	(Croatia) Rijeka
	Report	Janković 30'

Fadil Vokrri Stadium, Pristina
Attendance: 2,000
Referee: Jasmin Sabotic (Luxembourg)
3 August 2023
20:15

Rijeka (Croatia)	6–1	(Kosovo) Dukagjini
Pašalić 27'; Ivanović 39', 45+3', 90+2'; Goda 64'; Djouahra 81'	Report	Zulfiu 42'

Stadion Rujevica, Rijeka
Attendance: 6,827
Referee: Jamie Robinson (Northern Ireland)

Rijeka won 7–1 on aggregate.

27 July 2023
19:00

Gżira United (Malta)	2–0	(Luxembourg) F91 Dudelange
Lucas Macula 54'; Scerri 79'	Report

Centenary Stadium, Ta' Qali
Attendance: 358
Referee: Tomáš Klíma (Czech Republic)
2 August 2023
19:30

F91 Dudelange (Luxembourg)	2–1	(Malta) Gżira United
Hadji 38', 84'	Report	Wilkson 87'

Stade Jos Nosbaum, Dudelange
Attendance: 888
Referee: Yigal Frid (Israel)

Gżira United won 3–2 on aggregate.

27 July 2023
19:00

Djurgårdens IF (Sweden)	1–2	(Switzerland) Luzern
Löfgren 5'	Report	Ademi 29'; Kadák 82'

Tele2 Arena, Stockholm
Attendance: 17,921
Referee: Sander van der Eijk (Netherlands)
3 August 2023
20:45

Luzern (Switzerland)	1–1	(Sweden) Djurgårdens IF
Burch 27'	Report	Asoro 45+6'

Swissporarena, Lucerne
Attendance: 13,374
Referee: Genc Nuza (Kosovo)

Luzern won 3–2 on aggregate.

27 July 2023
20:00

Celje (Slovenia)	3–4	(Portugal) Vitória de Guimarães
Bobičanec 1'; Matko 59'; Edmilson 90+6'	Report	J. Silva 25'; A. Silva 35'; Amaro 70'; Nogueira 80'

Stadion Z'dežele, Celje
Attendance: 2,840
Referee: Chrysovalantis Theouli (Cyprus)
3 August 2023
21:15 (20:15 UTC+1)

Vitória de Guimarães (Portugal)	0–1 (a.e.t.)	(Slovenia) Celje
	Report	Bajde 65'
Penalties
T. Silva (penalty missed); Zé Carlos (penalty missed); Villanueva (penalty scored); Gaspar (penalty scored)	2–4	(penalty scored) Popović; (penalty missed) Kouter; (penalty scored) Bizjak; (penalty scored) Vrbanec; (penalty scored) Zec

Estádio D. Afonso Henriques, Guimarães
Attendance: 18,639
Referee: Viktor Kopiievskyi (Ukraine)

4–4 on aggregate; Celje won 4–2 on penalties.

27 July 2023
21:00

Sutjeska (Montenegro)	2–0	(Andorra) FC Santa Coloma
Šaletić 24'; Striković 73'	Report

DG Arena, Podgorica
Attendance: 350
Referee: Sandi Putros (Denmark)
3 August 2023
17:00

FC Santa Coloma (Andorra)	3–0 (a.e.t.)	(Montenegro) Sutjeska
Mourelo 35'; Nierga 71'; Garrido 96'	Report

Estadi Comunal, Andorra la Vella
Attendance: 212
Referee: Kristoffer Karlsson (Sweden)

FC Santa Coloma won 3–2 on aggregate.

27 July 2023
20:00 (21:00 UTC+3)

Hapoel Be'er Sheva (Israel)	1–0	(Lithuania) Panevėžys
Elias 35'	Report

Turner Stadium, Be'er Sheva
Attendance: 12,343
Referee: Rob Hennessy (Republic of Ireland)
3 August 2023
18:00 (19:00 UTC+3)

Panevėžys (Lithuania)	1–1	(Israel) Hapoel Be'er Sheva
Mbo 79'	Report	Vítor 53'

Sūduva Stadium, Marijampolė
Attendance: 920
Referee: Jan Petřík (Czech Republic)

Hapoel Be'er Sheva won 2–1 on aggregate.

27 July 2023
19:30

Vorskla Poltava (Ukraine)	2–1	(Georgia (country)) Dila Gori
Rodrigues 73'; Kane 90+3'	Report	Kovtalyuk 57'

Stadion Miejski, Tychy, Poland (Note: Due to the Russian invasion of Ukraine, Ukrainian teams were required to play their home matches at neutral venues until further notice.)
Attendance: 886
Referee: Nikola Popov (Bulgaria)
3 August 2023
19:00 (21:00 UTC+4)

Dila Gori (Georgia (country))	3–1	(Ukraine) Vorskla Poltava
Parulava 45'; Kovtalyuk 71'; Gale 86'	Report	Stepanyuk 74'

Tengiz Burjanadze Stadium, Gori
Attendance: 4,100
Referee: Simone Sozza (Italy)

Dila Gori won 4–3 on aggregate.

27 July 2023
19:30 (20:30 UTC+3)

CFR Cluj (Romania)	1–1	(Turkey) Adana Demirspor
Betancor 6'	Report	Stambouli 77'

Stadionul Dr. Constantin Rădulescu, Cluj-Napoca
Attendance: 9,847
Referee: Elchin Masiyev (Azerbaijan)
3 August 2023
20:00 (21:00 UTC+3)

Adana Demirspor (Turkey)	2–1	(Romania) CFR Cluj
David 43'; Ndiaye 90+4'	Report	Mogoș 68' (pen.)

New Adana Stadium, Adana
Attendance: 22,256
Referee: Nathan Verboomen (Belgium)

Adana Demirspor won 3–2 on aggregate.

27 July 2023
17:00 (21:00 UTC+6)

Ordabasy (Kazakhstan)	2–2	(Poland) Legia Warsaw
Sadovsky 13'; Mbodj 48'	Report	Pekhart 63'; Kramer 86'

Kazhymukan Munaitpasov Stadium, Shymkent
Attendance: 18,056
Referee: Helgi Mikael Jónasson (Iceland)
3 August 2023
21:00

Legia Warsaw (Poland)	3–2	(Kazakhstan) Ordabasy
Wszołek 18'; Yuri Ribeiro 42'; Pekhart 71'	Report	Sadovsky 57'; Malyi 84'

Stadion Wojska Polskiego, Warsaw
Attendance: 23,517
Referee: Kevin Clancy (Scotland)

Legia Warsaw won 5–4 on aggregate.

26 July 2023
18:00 (19:00 UTC+3)

RFS (Latvia)	0–2	(Azerbaijan) Sabah
	Report	Letić 22'; Volkovi 56'

Sloka Stadium, Jūrmala
Attendance: 1,855
Referee: Jan Machálek (Czech Republic)
3 August 2023
18:00 (20:00 UTC+4)

Sabah (Azerbaijan)	2–1	(Latvia) RFS
Mickels 77'; Apeh 90+4'	Report	Ikaunieks 67'

Bank Respublika Arena, Masazır
Attendance: 4,730
Referee: Fedayi San (Switzerland)

Sabah won 4–1 on aggregate.

27 July 2023
20:00 (21:00 UTC+3)

Beşiktaş (Turkey)	3–1	(Albania) Tirana
Bulut 21'; Muleka 42'; Kılıçsoy 90+4'	Report	Kainã 83'

Beşiktaş Park, Istanbul
Attendance: 22,820
Referee: Daniel Schlager (Germany)
3 August 2023
20:00

Tirana (Albania)	0–2	(Turkey) Beşiktaş
	Report	Amartey 57'; Aboubakar 75'

Arena Kombëtare, Tirana
Attendance: 10,865
Referee: Stuart Attwell (England)

Beşiktaş won 5–1 on aggregate.

27 July 2023
21:00

Željezničar (Bosnia and Herzegovina)	2–2	(Azerbaijan) Neftçi
Haračić 14'; Amoah 45+8'	Report	Kosorić 44' (o.g.); Hajiyev 90+5'

Stadion Grbavica, Sarajevo
Attendance: 13,157
Referee: Juri Frischer (Estonia)
3 August 2023
19:00 (21:00 UTC+4)

Neftçi (Azerbaijan)	2–0	(Bosnia and Herzegovina) Željezničar
Saief 20'; Eddy 68'	Report

Bakcell Arena, Baku
Attendance: 10,000
Referee: Balázs Berke (Hungary)

Neftçi won 4–2 on aggregate.

27 July 2023
19:00 (20:00 UTC+3)

APOEL (Cyprus)	2–1	(Serbia) Vojvodina
Kvilitaia 32'; Dvali 65'	Report	Zukić 56'

GSP Stadium, Nicosia
Attendance: 12,024
Referee: Don Robertson (Scotland)
3 August 2023
20:00

Vojvodina (Serbia)	1–2	(Cyprus) APOEL
Zukić 37'	Report	Sarfo 27'; Efrem 74' (pen.)

Karađorđe Stadium, Novi Sad
Attendance: 6,705
Referee: Vitālijs Spasjoņņikovs (Latvia)

APOEL won 4–2 on aggregate.

26 July 2023
19:30 (20:30 UTC+3)

CSKA 1948 (Bulgaria)	0–1	(Romania) FCSB
	Report	Coman 28'

Vasil Levski National Stadium, Sofia (Note: CSKA 1948 played their home match at the Vasil Levski National Stadium in Sofia, instead of their regular stadium, the Stadion Bistritsa in Bistritsa, which did not meet UEFA requirements.)
Attendance: 1,381
Referee: Luca Pairetto (Italy)
3 August 2023
20:30 (21:30 UTC+3)

FCSB (Romania)	3–2	(Bulgaria) CSKA 1948
Đoković 27', 82'; Oc. Popescu 90+1'	Report	Pedrinho 49'; Daskalov 68'

Stadionul Arcul de Triumf, Bucharest (Note: FCSB played their home match at the Stadionul Arcul de Triumf in Bucharest instead of their regular stadium, the Arena Națională in Bucharest.)
Attendance: 0 (Note: The FCSB v CSKA 1948 match was played behind closed doors due to a punishment by UEFA to FCSB for racist behaviour of fans during a match against West Ham United in the 2022–23 UEFA Europa Conference League group stage.)
Referee: Juxhin Xhaja (Albania)

FCSB won 4–2 on aggregate.

27 July 2023
17:00 (19:00 UTC+4)

Alashkert (Armenia)	0–1	(Hungary) Debrecen
	Report	Lončar 50'

Abovyan City Stadium, Abovyan (Note: Alashkert played their second qualifying round home match at the Abovyan City Stadium in Abovyan, instead of their regular stadium, the Alashkert Stadium in Yerevan, which did not meet UEFA requirements.)
Attendance: 2,870
Referee: Vassilis Fotias (Greece)
3 August 2023
21:00

Debrecen (Hungary)	1–2 (a.e.t.)	(Armenia) Alashkert
Dzsudzsák 76'	Report	Ustinov 18'; Mimito 67'
Penalties
Bódi (penalty scored); Mance (penalty scored); Bárány (penalty scored)	3–1	(penalty missed) Yedigaryan; (penalty missed) Mimito; (penalty scored) Mužek; (penalty missed) Fatai

Nagyerdei Stadion, Debrecen
Attendance: 10,708
Referee: Robert Schröder (Germany)

2–2 on aggregate; Debrecen won 3–1 on penalties.

27 July 2023
20:30

Lech Poznań (Poland)	3–1	(Lithuania) Kauno Žalgiris
Hotić 11'; Milić 41'; Murawski 45+2'	Report	Fase 57'

Stadion Poznań, Poznań
Attendance: 26,157
Referee: Luka Bilbija (Bosnia and Herzegovina)
3 August 2023
18:00 (19:00 UTC+3)

Kauno Žalgiris (Lithuania)	1–2	(Poland) Lech Poznań
Uzėla 90+5'	Report	Marchwiński 14'; Ba Loua 90+2'

Darius and Girėnas Stadium, Kaunas
Attendance: 5,180
Referee: Mads-Kristoffer Kristoffersen (Denmark)

Lech Poznań won 5–2 on aggregate.

27 July 2023
19:00

Kalmar FF (Sweden)	1–2	(Armenia) Pyunik
Trenskow 44'	Report	Juričić 55'; Bravo 81'

Guldfågeln Arena, Kalmar
Attendance: 7,421
Referee: Ian McNabb (Northern Ireland)
3 August 2023
17:00 (19:00 UTC+4)

Pyunik (Armenia)	2–1	(Sweden) Kalmar FF
Dashyan 75'; Harutyunyan 77'	Report	Rajović 88'

Abovyan City Stadium, Abovyan
Attendance: 3,100
Referee: Igor Stojchevski (North Macedonia)

Pyunik won 4–2 on aggregate.

27 July 2023
18:00

Bodø/Glimt (Norway)	3–0	(Czech Republic) Bohemians 1905
Grønbæk 44'; Pellegrino 50'; Espejord 90+2'	Report

Aspmyra Stadion, Bodø
Attendance: 7,476
Referee: Arda Kardeşler (Turkey)
3 August 2023
19:05

Bohemians 1905 (Czech Republic)	2–4	(Norway) Bodø/Glimt
Matoušek 26'; Křapka 55'	Report	Sørli 22'; Moumbagna 42'; Grønbæk 78'; Sørensen 87'

Stadion Letná, Prague (Note: Bohemians played their home match at the Letná Stadion in Prague, instead of their regular stadium, the Ďolíček in Prague, which did not meet UEFA requirements.)
Attendance: 12,089
Referee: Marcel Bîrsan (Romania)

Bodø/Glimt won 7–2 on aggregate.

27 July 2023
19:00 (20:00 UTC+3)

Auda (Latvia)	1–1	(Slovakia) Spartak Trnava
Ramires 60'	Report	Kóša 7'

Skonto Stadium, Riga (Note: Auda played their home match at the Skonto Stadium in Riga, instead of their regular stadium, the Auda stadions in Ķekava, which did not meet UEFA requirements.)
Attendance: 1,134
Referee: Kári Á Høvdanum (Faroe Islands)
3 August 2023
17:30

Spartak Trnava (Slovakia)	4–1	(Latvia) Auda
Daniel 36'; Djuricin 38'; Štetina 45+1'; Procházka 75'	Report	Achol 88'

Anton Malatinský Stadium, Trnava
Attendance: 7,394
Referee: Luca Cibelli (Switzerland)

Spartak Trnava won 5–2 on aggregate.

27 July 2023
20:00

Osijek (Croatia)	1–0	(Hungary) Zalaegerszeg
Miérez 90+1'	Report

Opus Arena, Osijek
Attendance: 12,011
Referee: Bastian Dankert (Germany)
3 August 2023
18:45

Zalaegerszeg (Hungary)	1–2	(Croatia) Osijek
Ikoba 82'	Report	Gergényi 9' (o.g.); Špoljarić 73'

ZTE Aréna, Zalaegerszeg
Attendance: 5,347
Referee: Gal Leibovitz (Israel)

Osijek won 3–1 on aggregate.

27 July 2023
20:00

Twente (Netherlands)	1–0	(Sweden) Hammarby IF
Steijn 53'	Report

De Grolsch Veste, Enschede
Attendance: 29,500
Referee: John Brooks (England)
3 August 2023
20:00

Hammarby IF (Sweden)	1–1 (a.e.t.)	(Netherlands) Twente
Erabi 38'	Report	Steijn 115'

Tele2 Arena, Stockholm
Attendance: 24,542
Referee: Manfredas Lukjančukas (Lithuania)

Twente won 2–1 on aggregate.

27 July 2023
20:00 (18:00 UTC+0)

KA (Iceland)	3–1	(Republic of Ireland) Dundalk
B. Aðalsteinsson 28'; Hauksson 37', 45'	Report	Kelly 32'

Framvöllur, Reykjavík
Attendance: 915
Referee: Georgi Davidov (Bulgaria)
3 August 2023
20:45 (19:45 UTC+1)

Dundalk (Republic of Ireland)	2–2	(Iceland) KA
Martin 33'; Sloggett 89'	Report	Edmundsson 14'; H. M. Steingrimsson 81' (pen.)

Oriel Park, Dundalk
Attendance: 2,900
Referee: Walter Altmann (Austria)

KA won 5–3 on aggregate.

27 July 2023
20:00

Club Brugge (Belgium)	3–0	(Denmark) AGF
Buchanan 10'; Rits 48'; Vetlesen 76'	Report

Jan Breydel Stadium, Bruges
Attendance: 18,925
Referee: Goga Kikacheishvili (Georgia)
3 August 2023
20:00

AGF (Denmark)	1–0	(Belgium) Club Brugge
Beijmo 3'	Report

Aarhus Stadium, Aarhus
Attendance: 12,651
Referee: Atilla Karaoğlan (Turkey)

Club Brugge won 3–1 on aggregate.

27 July 2023
21:00 (20:00 UTC+1)

Crusaders (Northern Ireland)	2–2	(Norway) Rosenborg
Lowry 11'; Reitan 74' (o.g.)	Report	Holse 30'; Sæter 42' (pen.)

Seaview, Belfast
Attendance: 2,278
Referee: Evangelos Manouchos (Greece)
3 August 2023
19:00

Rosenborg (Norway)	3–2 (a.e.t.)	(Northern Ireland) Crusaders
Nelson 34'; Þorvaldsson 102'; Cornic 108'	Report	Lowry 45'; Heatley 105'

Lerkendal Stadion, Trondheim
Attendance: 11,288
Referee: Ádám Farkas (Hungary)

Rosenborg won 5–4 on aggregate.

27 July 2023
17:00

Inter Club d'Escaldes (Andorra)	2–1	(Scotland) Hibernian
Gallego 15'; Jean Luc 71'	Report	Newell 90+1'

Estadi Comunal, Andorra la Vella
Attendance: 223
Referee: Joni Hyytiä (Finland)
3 August 2023
20:15 (19:15 UTC+1)

Hibernian (Scotland)	6–1	(Andorra) Inter Club d'Escaldes
Boyle 10', 22'; Doidge 29'; Campbell 48', 61'; Youan 65'	Report	De La Torre 83'

Easter Road, Edinburgh
Attendance: 13,840
Referee: Peter Kráľovič (Slovakia)

Hibernian won 7–3 on aggregate.

27 July 2023
19:00

Viktoria Plzeň (Czech Republic)	0–0	(Kosovo) Drita
	Report

Doosan Arena, Plzeň
Attendance: 10,334
Referee: Henrik Nalbandyan (Armenia)
3 August 2023
20:00

Drita (Kosovo)	1–2	(Czech Republic) Viktoria Plzeň
Bl. Krasniqi 90+2'	Report	Durosinmi 76'; Jirka 90+21' (pen.)

Fadil Vokrri Stadium, Pristina (Note: Drita played their home match at the Fadil Vokrri Stadium in Pristina, instead of their regular stadium, the Gjilan City Stadium in Gjilan, which did not meet UEFA requirements.)
Attendance: 8,000
Referee: Jakob Alexander Sundberg (Denmark)

Viktoria Plzeň won 2–1 on aggregate.

27 July 2023
20:00 (19:00 UTC+1)

B36 (Faroe Islands)	2–1	(Wales) Haverfordwest County
Agnarsson 11'; Johansen 60'	Report	Taylor-Crossdale 80'

Gundadalur, Tórshavn
Attendance: 1,231
Referee: Snir Levy (Israel)
3 August 2023
20:45 (19:45 UTC+1)

Haverfordwest County (Wales)	1–1 (a.e.t.)	(Faroe Islands) B36
Fawcett 66'	Report	Benjaminsen 100' (pen.)

Cardiff City Stadium, Cardiff
Attendance: 2,119
Referee: Christian-Petru Ciochirca (Austria)

B36 won 3–2 on aggregate.

27 July 2023
19:30

Basel (Switzerland)	1–3	(Kazakhstan) Tobol
Barry 25'	Report	Déblé 57' (pen.); Orazov 62'; Chesnokov 71'

St. Jakob-Park, Basel
Attendance: 12,287
Referee: Gustavo Correia (Portugal)
3 August 2023
16:00 (20:00 UTC+6)

Tobol (Kazakhstan)	1–2	(Switzerland) Basel
Déblé 43' (pen.)	Report	Kade 26'; Augustin 32' (pen.)

Central Stadium, Kostanay
Attendance: 8,420
Referee: Miloš Milanović (Serbia)

Tobol won 4–3 on aggregate.

27 July 2023
19:30

Differdange 03 (Luxembourg)	1–1	(Slovenia) Maribor
Castro 25'	Report	Jakupović 90+6'

Stade Municipal, Differdange
Attendance: 1,925
Referee: Joonas Jaanovits (Estonia)
3 August 2023
20:30

Maribor (Slovenia)	4–3 (a.e.t.)	(Luxembourg) Differdange 03
Kolar 5'; Repas 62'; Brnić 82'; Iličić 120+2' (pen.)	Report	Castro 27' (pen.); Trani 42', 46'

Ljudski vrt, Maribor
Attendance: 6,000
Referee: Krzysztof Jakubik (Poland)

Maribor won 5–4 on aggregate.

27 July 2023
20:30

Austria Wien	1–0	(Bosnia and Herzegovina) Borac Banja Luka
Tabaković 90+4'	Report

Franz Horr Stadium, Vienna
Attendance: 9,717
Referee: Joey Kooij (Netherlands)
3 August 2023
20:30

Borac Banja Luka (Bosnia and Herzegovina)	1–2	Austria Wien
Cortés 49'	Report	Gruber 53'; Polster 65'

Banja Luka City Stadium, Banja Luka
Attendance: 8,653
Referee: Urs Schnyder (Switzerland)

Austria Wien won 3–1 on aggregate.

27 July 2023
19:00 (20:00 UTC+3)

CSKA Sofia (Bulgaria)	0–2	(Romania) Sepsi OSK
	Report	Păun 68'; Varga 81'

Stadion Balgarska Armia, Sofia
Attendance: 7,966
Referee: Jochem Kamphuis (Netherlands)
3 August 2023
19:00 (20:00 UTC+3)

Sepsi OSK (Romania)	4–0	(Bulgaria) CSKA Sofia
Matei 19' (pen.); Aganović 70'; Varga 90'; Alimi 90+5' (pen.)	Report

Stadionul Sepsi Arena, Sfântu Gheorghe
Attendance: 8,270
Referee: Eldorjan Hamiti (Albania)

Sepsi OSK won 6–0 on aggregate.

27 July 2023
17:00 (19:00 UTC+4)

Ararat-Armenia	1–1	(Greece) Aris
Eza 11'	Report	Palma 20'

Yerevan Football Academy Stadium, Yerevan
Attendance: 1,400
Referee: Bulat Sariyev (Kazakhstan)
3 August 2023
20:15 (21:15 UTC+3)

Aris (Greece)	1–0	Ararat-Armenia
Fabiano 80'	Report

Kleanthis Vikelidis Stadium, Thessaloniki
Attendance: 11,217
Referee: Michael Fabbri (Italy)

Aris won 2–1 on aggregate.

27 July 2023
19:30 (20:30 UTC+3)

Maccabi Tel Aviv (Israel)	3–0	(Moldova) Petrocub Hîncești
Biton 13'; Zahavi 63'; Do. Peretz 90+4'	Report

Bloomfield Stadium, Tel Aviv
Attendance: 20,091
Referee: Matthew De Gabriele (Malta)
3 August 2023
19:00 (20:00 UTC+3)

Petrocub Hîncești (Moldova)	0–2	(Israel) Maccabi Tel Aviv
	Report	Guiagon 90+1'; Do. Peretz 90+3'

Zimbru Stadium, Chișinău (Note: Petrocub played their home match at the Zimbru Stadium in Chișinău, instead of their regular stadium, the Stadionul Municipal in Hîncești, which did not meet UEFA requirements.)
Attendance: 5,348
Referee: Peter Kjæsgaard (Denmark)

Maccabi Tel Aviv won 5–0 on aggregate.

27 July 2023
20:00

Torpedo-BelAZ Zhodino (Belarus)	2–3	(Cyprus) AEK Larnaca
Glushchenkov 70'; Ovono 73'	Report	Gyurcsó 6' (pen.); Casas 16'; Faraj 40'

Városi-Stadion, Mezőkövesd, Hungary
Attendance: 0
Referee: Tim Marshall (Northern Ireland)
2 August 2023
19:00 (20:00 UTC+3)

AEK Larnaca (Cyprus)	1–1	(Belarus) Torpedo-BelAZ Zhodino
Pons 90+6'	Report	Gorbachik 90+8'

AEK Arena – Georgios Karapatakis, Larnaca
Attendance: 3,925
Referee: Marian Alexandru Barbu (Romania)

AEK Larnaca won 4–3 on aggregate.

27 July 2023
19:00 (21:00 UTC+4)

Torpedo Kutaisi (Georgia (country))	1–4	(Kazakhstan) Aktobe
Arabidze 89'	Report	Kasym 34' (pen.); Raičković 43'; Samorodov 73'; Filipović 90+3'

Ramaz Shengelia Stadium, Kutaisi
Attendance: 9,976
Referee: Jonathan Lardot (Belgium)
3 August 2023
18:00 (21:00 UTC+5)

Aktobe (Kazakhstan)	1–2	(Georgia (country)) Torpedo Kutaisi
Samorodov 31'	Report	Arabidze 58'; Bugridze 66'

Central Stadium, Aktobe
Attendance: 12,354
Referee: Trustin Farrugia Cann (Malta)

Aktobe won 5–3 on aggregate.

26 July 2023
18:45

Midtjylland (Denmark)	2–0	(Luxembourg) Progrès Niederkorn
Dalsgaard 38'; Kaba 59'	Report

MCH Arena, Herning
Attendance: 6,609
Referee: Volen Chinkov (Bulgaria)
3 August 2023
19:30

Progrès Niederkorn (Luxembourg)	2–1 (a.e.t.)	(Denmark) Midtjylland
De Almeida 15', 52'	Report	Chilufya 112'

Stade Municipal, Differdange
Attendance: 1,780
Referee: Ferenc Karakó (Hungary)

Midtjylland won 3–2 on aggregate.

27 July 2023
20:45 (19:45 UTC+1)

Derry City (Republic of Ireland)	2–1	(Finland) KuPS
Patching 69'; C. Kavanagh 79'	Report	Vidjeskog 45' (pen.)

Ryan McBride Brandywell Stadium, Derry
Attendance: 3,355
Referee: Robertas Valikonis (Lithuania)
3 August 2023
18:00 (19:00 UTC+3)

KuPS (Finland)	3–3	(Republic of Ireland) Derry City
Tuominen 24'; Savolainen 44', 58'	Report	C. Kavanagh 13'; Diallo 55'; Duffy 69'

Kuopio Football Stadium, Kuopio
Attendance: 2,524
Referee: Dario Bel (Croatia)

Derry City won 5–4 on aggregate.

27 July 2023
20:00

Gent (Belgium)	5–1	(Slovakia) Žilina
Orban 23'; De Sart 55'; Cuypers 67', 85'; Watanabe 76'	Report	Kaprálik 79'

Ghelamco Arena, Ghent
Attendance: 8,904
Referee: Visar Kastrati (Kosovo)
3 August 2023
20:00

Žilina (Slovakia)	2–5	(Belgium) Gent
Kaprálik 66'; Bari 77'	Report	Hjulsager 30'; Cuypers 62', 89'; Tissoudali 70'; Gerkens 72'

Štadión pod Dubňom, Žilina
Attendance: 6,224
Referee: Dumitri Muntean (Moldova)

Gent won 10–3 on aggregate.

27 July 2023
19:00

Kecskemét (Hungary)	2–1	(Latvia) Riga
Szuhodovszki 52' (pen.); Pálinkás 85'	Report	Contreras 86'

Széktói Stadion, Kecskemét
Attendance: 3,991
Referee: Irakli Kvirikashvili (Georgia)
3 August 2023
19:00 (20:00 UTC+3)

Riga (Latvia)	3–1 (a.e.t.)	(Hungary) Kecskemét
Muzinga 62'; Mankenda 90+5'; Ngom 120+2'	Report	Vágó 8'

Skonto Stadium, Riga
Attendance: 5,533
Referee: Iwan Arwel Griffith (Wales)

Riga won 4–3 on aggregate.

27 July 2023
20:45 (19:45 UTC+1)

Linfield (Northern Ireland)	2–5	(Poland) Pogoń Szczecin
Finlayson 56'; Hall 80'	Report	Grosicki 14' (pen.); Gamboa 40'; Malec 63'; Koulouris 66'; Fornalczyk 90+5'

Windsor Park, Belfast
Attendance: 4,570
Referee: David Šmajc (Slovenia)
3 August 2023
18:00

Pogoń Szczecin (Poland)	3–2	(Northern Ireland) Linfield
Koulouris 49'; Wahlqvist 58'; Bichakhchyan 75'	Report	Mulgrew 16'; McClean 51'

Stadion Miejski im. Floriana Krygiera, Szczecin
Attendance: 16,839
Referee: Abdulkadir Bitigen (Turkey)

Pogoń Szczecin won 8–4 on aggregate.

27 July 2023
19:30 (20:30 UTC+3)

PAOK (Greece)	0–0	(Israel) Beitar Jerusalem
	Report

Toumba Stadium, Thessaloniki
Attendance: 16,851
Referee: Mykola Balakin (Ukraine)
3 August 2023
19:30 (20:30 UTC+3)

Beitar Jerusalem (Israel)	1–4	(Greece) PAOK
Friday 45+7'	Report	Gotlieb 12' (o.g.); Brandon 45+1'; Thomas 90+2' (o.g.); Konstantelias 90+6'

Teddy Stadium, Jerusalem
Attendance: 26,557
Referee: Benoît Millot (France)

PAOK won 4–1 on aggregate.

26 July 2023
20:00

Neman Grodno (Belarus)	2–0	(Malta) Balzan
Savitsky 54'; Karpovich 85'	Report

Ménfői úti Stadion, Győr, Hungary
Attendance: 0
Referee: Ívar Orri Kristjánsson (Iceland)
1 August 2023
20:30

Balzan (Malta)	0–0	(Belarus) Neman Grodno
	Report

Centenary Stadium, Ta' Qali
Attendance: 568
Referee: Ioannis Papadopoulos (Greece)

Neman Grodno won 2–0 on aggregate.

26 July 2023
20:00 (21:00 UTC+3)

Fenerbahçe (Turkey)	5–0	(Moldova) Zimbru Chișinău
Kadıoğlu 11'; Kent 14'; Džeko 61'; Szymański 63'; King 88'	Report

Şükrü Saracoğlu Stadium, Istanbul
Attendance: 26,526
Referee: Nenad Minaković (Serbia)
1 August 2023
19:30 (20:30 UTC+3)

Zimbru Chișinău (Moldova)	0–4	(Turkey) Fenerbahçe
	Report	Tadić 48'; Batshuayi 57', 59'; Yüksek 77'

Zimbru Stadium, Chișinău
Attendance: 7,569
Referee: Rob Harvey (Republic of Ireland)

Fenerbahçe won 9–0 on aggregate.

27 July 2023
18:00 (20:00 UTC+4)

Gabala (Azerbaijan)	2–3	(Cyprus) Omonia
Allach 4', 62'	Report	Bezus 45+1', 50', 82' (pen.)

Gabala City Stadium, Gabala
Attendance: 1,957
Referee: Andrei Chivulete (Romania)
3 August 2023
19:00 (20:00 UTC+3)

Omonia (Cyprus)	4–1	(Azerbaijan) Gabala
Bezus 5', 30' (pen.); Lang 38'; Coulibaly 59'	Report	Isaiah 56'

GSP Stadium, Nicosia
Attendance: 15,048
Referee: Adam Ladebäck (Sweden)

Omonia won 7–3 on aggregate.

27 July 2023
21:00

Shkupi (North Macedonia)	0–2	(Bulgaria) Levski Sofia
	Report	Welton Felipe 31'; Ronaldo 90+4'

Toše Proeski Arena, Skopje
Attendance: 6,000
Referee: David Fuxman (Israel)
3 August 2023
19:00 (20:00 UTC+3)

Levski Sofia (Bulgaria)	1–0	(North Macedonia) Shkupi
Petkov 90+11'	Report

Stadion Georgi Asparuhov, Sofia
Attendance: 16,424
Referee: Lionel Tschudi (Switzerland)

Levski Sofia won 3–0 on aggregate.
