= André Fausto =

Brazilian footballer

Personal information
- Full name: André Fausto Prates Rodrigues Júnior
- Date of birth: 4 May 1994 (age 32)
- Place of birth: Porto Alegre, Brazil
- Height: 1.80 m (5 ft 11 in)
- Position: Defender

Team information
- Current team: Balzan
- Number: 4

Senior career*
Years	Team	Apps	(Gls)
–2017	Barra		
2017–2020	Avenida	2	(0)
2020–2022	St. Lucia	47	(4)
2022–2023	Gudja United	18	(2)
2023–	Balzan	22	(0)
- * Club domestic league appearances and goals as of 13 May 2024

André Fausto Prates Rodrigues Júnior (born 4 May 1994), also known as André Fausto, is a Brazilian footballer who plays for Maltese Premier League club Balzan as a defender.

== Career ==
Andre Fausto spent time playing throughout Brazil before moving to Malta and signing with St. Lucia, where he notched up 47 league appearances before moving to Gudja United. In 2023, Andre Fausto transferred to his third Maltese club, signing for Balzan ahead of the club's debut in the UEFA Europa Conference League. He debuted in the first qualifying round against Slovenian PrvaLiga club Domžale. In the second leg tie at Centenary Stadium, with the scores locked at 4–4 on aggregate, Andre Fausto scored the decisive winner in the fourth minute of extra time. Minutes later, he received a second yellow card for a rough tackle, after the referee Visar Kastrati had booked him for removing his shirt during his goal celebration.
