= Dag Opjordsmoen =

Norwegian footballer (born 1955)

Personal information
- Date of birth: 5 August 1955 (age 71)

Senior career*
Years	Team	Apps	(Gls)
1973–1982	Raufoss		
1983–1984	Hamkam		
1984–1985	Raufoss		

Managerial career
- 1985–1987: Raufoss
- 1988–1989: Raufoss
- 1991–1996: Nybergsund
- 1997–1998: Raufoss
- 1999–2001: Bodø/Glimt
- 2001–2007: Raufoss
- * Club domestic league appearances and goals

Dag Opjordsmoen (born 5 August 1955) is a Norwegian football player and manager.

== Career ==
Opjordsmoen started his career in Raufoss IL, amassing 300 games across all competitions in ten seasons. Ahead of the 1983 season he went on to Hamkam. He made a comeback in Raufoss in the summer of 1984. He retired ahead of the 1986 season and became head coach.

Opjordsmoen managed Raufoss until 1987, then again from the summer of 1988. Both his successors, Torbjørn Brobakken in early 1988 and Torfinn Overn in early 1990, were sacked after half a season. Opjordsmoen went on to Nybergsund IL from 1991 to 1996 and Raufoss again from 1997 to 1998, leading the team into the 1998 1. divisjon. In the autumn of 1998 he was interviewed as new manager of FK Haugesund, but was instead hired in FK Bodø/Glimt. He resigned in May 2001.

In July 2001 he returned to Raufoss the day after Börje Andersson was sacked. He quit his manager job after the 2007 season, when Raufoss was demoted from the 2007 1. divisjon for financial reasons.
