= Øystein Gåre =

Norwegian football coach (1954–2010)

Personal information
- Date of birth: 30 June 1954
- Date of death: 18 September 2010 (aged 56)

Managerial career
- Years: Team
- FK Bodø/Glimt

Øystein Gåre (30 June 1954 – 18 September 2010) was a Norwegian football coach. He is best known to have led FK Bodø/Glimt to silver medals in both the Norwegian Premier League and the Norwegian Football Cup in 2003; for this Gåre received the Kniksen award as coach of the year. In November 2006, Gåre was hired as the new coach for the Norway national under-21 football team.

Gåre died on 18 September 2010, 56 years old.
