= Northern Norwegian Cup =

- Founded: 1929
- Abolished: 1969
- Region: Northern Norway
- Last champions: Bodø/Glimt (9th title)
- Most championships: Bodø/Glimt; Harstad; Mjølner (9 titles each)

The Northern Norwegian Cup (Norwegian: Nord-Norgesmesterskapet i fotball) was a Norwegian football tournament for men that was contested annually between 1929 and 1969. It was made for clubs from Northern Norway, because these were not allowed admission into the All-Norwegian cup until 1963. After the admission of Northern Norwegian teams, the cup lost its importance, and was ended in 1969.

== List of champions ==
- 1929: FK Narvik/Nor
- 1930: FK Bodø/Glimt (under the name Glimt)
- 1931: Tromsø IL (under the name Tor)
- 1932: Harstad IL
- 1933: FK Bodø/Glimt (under the name Glimt)
- 1934: FK Bodø/Glimt (under the name Glimt)
- 1935: FK Mjølner
- 1936: IF Fløya
- 1937: FK Narvik/Nor
- 1938: Harstad IL
- 1939: FK Bodø/Glimt (under the name Glimt)
- 1940–1945: No tournament (German occupation of Norway)
- 1946: FK Mjølner
- 1947: FK Mjølner
- 1948: FK Mjølner
- 1949: Tromsø IL
- 1950: FK Narvik/Nor
- 1951: FK Mjølner
- 1952: FK Bodø/Glimt
- 1953: Harstad IL
- 1954: Harstad IL
- 1955: Harstad IL
- 1956: Tromsø IL
- 1957: Harstad IL
- 1958: Harstad IL
- 1959: FK Narvik/Nor
- 1960: FK Mjølner
- 1961: FK Mjølner
- 1962: Harstad IL
- 1963: FK Bodø/Glimt
- 1964: FK Bodø/Glimt
- 1965: FK Mjølner
- 1966: FK Mjølner
- 1967: FK Bodø/Glimt
- 1968: Harstad IL
- 1969: FK Bodø/Glimt

== Performances ==
=== Performances by team ===
Club	Winners	Runners-up	Winning Years	Years as runners-up
Harstad	9	6	1932, 1938, 1953, 1954, 1955, 1957, 1958, 1962, 1968	1929, 1930, 1935, 1956, 1959, 1960
Mjølner	9	6	1935, 1946, 1947, 1948, 1951, 1960, 1961, 1965, 1966	1933, 1953, 1963, 1964, 1968, 1969
Bodø/Glimt	9	5	1930, 1933, 1934, 1939, 1952, 1963, 1964, 1967, 1969	1949, 1955, 1961, 1962, 1966
Narvik/Nor	4	7	1929, 1937, 1950, 1959	1936, 1938, 1946, 1948, 1951, 1954, 1965
Tromsø	3	2	1931, 1949, 1956	1937, 1952
Fløya	1	–	1936	–
Kirkenes	–	2	–	1934, 1939
Mo	–	2	–	1931, 1967
Sandnessjøen	–	1	–	1932
Bodø BK	–	1	–	1947
Norild	–	1	–	1950
Mosjøen	–	1	–	1957
Bardufoss/Omegn	–	1	–	1958

Note: after club merger in 1996 FK Mjølner have 13 championship titles (9 as Mjølner and 4 as Narvik/Nor). After the merging the new club was named FK Narvik - later renamed Mjølner.
