= FK Bodø/Glimt =

Norwegian association football club

Bodø/Glimt
- Full name: Fotballklubben Bodø/Glimt
- Nickname: Glimt (Gleam)
- Founded: 19 September 1916; 110 years ago
- Ground: Aspmyra Stadion, Bodø
- Capacity: 8,270
- President: Inge Henning Andersen
- Manager: Kjetil Knutsen
- League: Eliteserien
- 2025: Eliteserien, 2nd of 16
- Website: glimt.no
Home colours	Away colours

Fotballklubben Bodø/Glimt (Norwegian pronunciation: [ˈbûːdøːˌɡlɪmt]), also referred to as Bodø/Glimt or its former name Glimt ("Gleam"), is a Norwegian professional football club from the city of Bodø in Bodø Municipality, Nordland county, Norway. The club currently plays in Eliteserien, the Norwegian top division. The club was founded on 19 September 1916.

Bodø/Glimt are four-time champions in Norway after winning the 2020, 2021, 2023, and 2024 Eliteserien seasons. They also have won the now-defunct Northern Norwegian Cup nine times, and the Norwegian Cup three times. They were the first team from northern Norway to win a national title by winning the cup in 1975, the first team from the region to win the national league, and also the northernmost European club to win a national league competition.

After being promoted to the top flight ahead of the 2018 season, the club has experienced the greatest success in its history, winning the league championship four years in five seasons, reaching the quarter-finals of the UEFA Europa Conference League in 2022, and the semi-finals of the UEFA Europa League in 2025, becoming the first Norwegian club to reach the last four of a European club competition. Bodø/Glimt qualified for the league phase of the UEFA Champions League for the first time the same year, becoming the northernmost team to ever play in that stage of the competition, reaching the round of 16.

== History ==
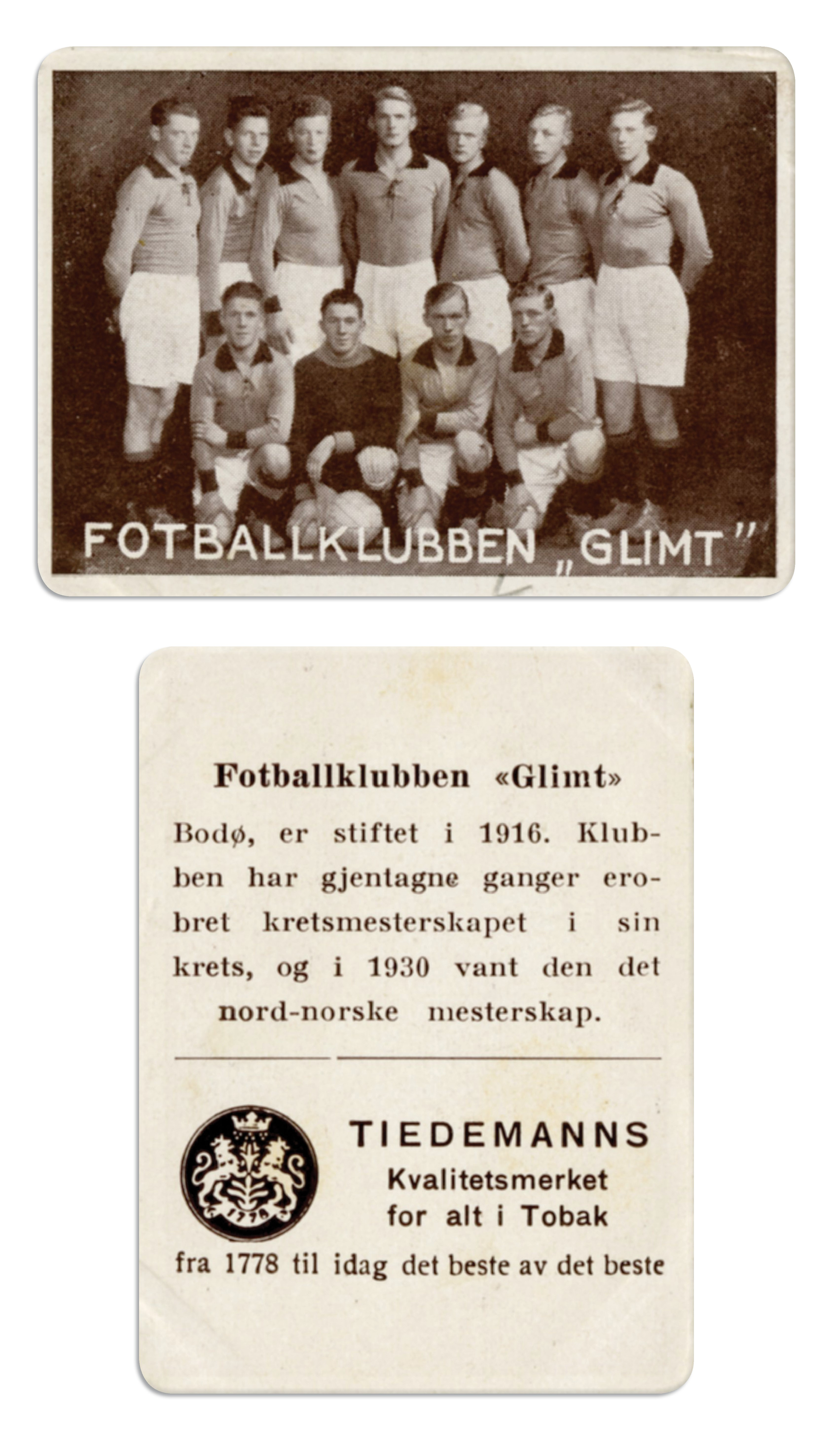
Collectible card of the Bodø/Glimt team circa 1930. Such cards featuring Norwegian and international sports heroes were included in cigarette packs in the 1920s and 1930s - hence the tobacco advertisement on the reverse.

The club changed its name to FK Bodø/Glimt in 1948.

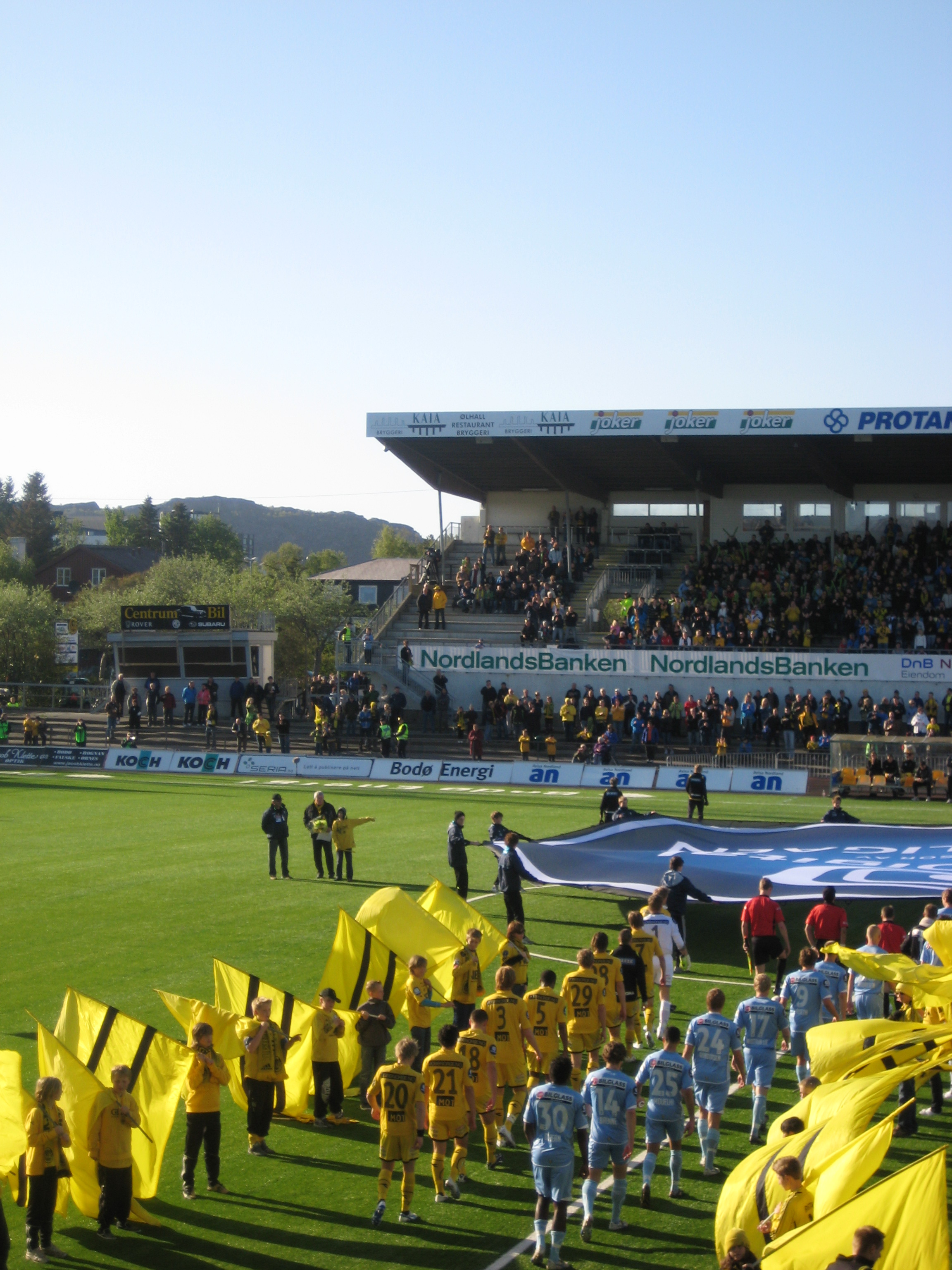
Bodø/Glimt against Lillestrøm in the 9th round of the 2008 Tippeligaen at Aspmyra Stadion

=== European breakthrough ===
Bodø/Glimt's domestic success was followed by qualification for the UEFA competitions. From 2020 to 2025, Bodø/Glimt progressed from the UEFA Europa Conference League to the UEFA Europa League and ultimately the UEFA Champions League, reaching the Conference League quarter-finals in 2022, the Europa League semi-finals in 2025 and the Champions League round of 16 in 2026. By then, the club had developed from an occasional European qualifier into a regular participant in the later stages of UEFA competitions.

The European progression largely coincided with the continuation of the sporting model developed under Kjetil Knutsen. Rather than substantially changing its approach when facing wealthier opponents, Bodø/Glimt retained a possession-oriented, high-intensity style and placed considerable emphasis on player development, collective organisation and continuity. These principles were consistent with the club's wider strategic framework, Vårres Måte ("Our Way"), which stresses development, performance, collective responsibility and the importance of developing an identity suited to the club's northern Norwegian circumstances. The club became noted for developing relatively inexpensive or previously overlooked players, as well as reintegrating former players, while repeatedly rebuilding the squad following transfers to larger leagues.

European participation also transformed the club financially. Increased UEFA distributions, commercial income and player-transfer revenue gave Bodø/Glimt resources on a scale unprecedented in the club's history. The effect became particularly pronounced in 2025, when Deloitte reported that the club generated NOK 497 million in UEFA revenue and that its total revenue rose by 125 per cent to NOK 759 million. The increased financial capacity enabled greater investment in the playing squad, coaching and support functions, while also increasing the importance of maintaining regular participation in European competition.

The European campaigns substantially raised Bodø/Glimt's international profile and brought wider attention to the club's location, ownership structure and development model. International coverage frequently contrasted the relatively small population of Bodø and the limited capacity of Aspmyra with the resources of many of the clubs Glimt faced. At the same time, the European success reinforced the club's traditional association with northern Norwegian identity and regional pride. By the middle of the 2020s, European competition had become not only one of the club's principal sporting arenas but also an important part of its economic and institutional development.

== Honours ==
Bodø/Glimt have won 15 domestic trophies, including the Eliteserien four times and the Norwegian Cup twice. They were the first team from Northern Norway to win a national title, claiming the Norwegian Cup in 1975, and later became the first team from the region to win the Eliteserien in 2020. Between 2020 and 2024, the club won four league championships in five seasons, establishing themselves as a dominant force in Norwegian football.

Prior to northern clubs being allowed to compete in national tournaments, Bodø/Glimt won the regional Northern Norwegian Cup nine times, making them the most successful club in the competition's history.

Bodø/Glimt honours
Type	Competition	Titles	Seasons
Domestic	Eliteserien	4	2020, 2021, 2023, 2024
Domestic	Norwegian Cup	3	1975, 1993, 2025–26
Domestic	1. divisjon	2	2013, 2017
Domestic	Northern Norwegian Cup	9	1930, 1933, 1934, 1939, 1952, 1963, 1964, 1967, 1969

Notes

Bodø/Glimt also reached the quarter-finals of the UEFA Europa Conference League in 2022 and the semi-finals of the UEFA Europa League in 2025, becoming the first Norwegian club to reach the last four of a European competition. They qualified for the UEFA Champions League league phase for the first time in 2025, advancing to the round of 16 after defeating Inter Milan.

== Club statistics and records ==
=== Domestic ===
Season		Tier	Pos.	Pl.	W	D	L	GS	GA	P	Cup	Notes
1963	3. divisjon district IX	3rd	1	10	9	1	0	45	10	19	Fourth round	Promotion not possible
1964	3. divisjon district IX	3rd	1	10	10	0	0	39	5	20	Third round	Promotion not possible
1965	3. divisjon district IX	3rd	1	10	8	1	1	37	8	17	Third round	Promotion not possible
1966	3. divisjon district IX	3rd	2	10	7	2	1	37	9	16	Third round	Promotion not possible
1967	3. divisjon district IX-X	3rd	3	10	4	2	4	21	14	10	Second round	Promotion not possible
1968	3. divisjon district IX-X	3rd	1	10	5	4	1	19	9	14	Third round	Promotion not possible
1969	3. divisjon district IX-X	3rd	2	10	7	0	3	35	11	14	Third round	Promotion not possible
1970	2. divisjon district IX-X	2nd	2	14	7	4	3	40	14	17	First round	Promotion not possible

1971 was the first year northern Norwegian teams could win promotion for the top division (First possible year in the top division would have been 1972). Until 1978, the winner of the northern Norwegian group of the second tier had to enter promotion playoffs against the second placed teams of the two southern Norwegian second tier groups. 1979 was thus the first year northern Norwegian teams competed on equal terms as the southern Norwegian teams.

Season		Tier	Pos.	Pl.	W	D	L	GS	GA	P	Cup	Notes
1971	2. divisjon district IX-X	2nd	5	14	5	2	7	10	19	12	Third round	
1972	2. divisjon district IX-X	2nd	2	14	4	8	2	23	10	16	Fourth round	
1973	2. divisjon district IX-X	2nd	3	14	8	1	5	34	16	17	First round	
1974	2. divisjon district IX-X	2nd	1	14	11	3	0	54	4	25	Semi-final	Lost promotion to 1. divisjon playoffs
1975	2. divisjon district IX-X	2nd	1	14	14	0	0	55	12	28	Winner	Lost promotion to 1. divisjon playoffs
1976	2. divisjon district IX-XI	2nd	↑1	14	13	1	0	60	11	27	Quarter-final	Promoted to 1. divisjon through playoffs
1977	1. divisjon	Top	2	22	10	8	4	33	24	28	Final	
1978	1. divisjon	Top	9	22	6	6	10	37	37	18	Third round	
1979	1. divisjon	Top	7	22	8	5	9	19	26	21	Second round	
1980	1. divisjon	Top	↓ 12	22	5	2	15	13	43	12	Fourth round	Relegated to 2. divisjon
1981	2. divisjon group B	2nd	7	22	5	11	6	24	24	21	Third round	
1982	2. divisjon group A	2nd	8	22	7	7	8	26	24	21	Fourth round	
1983	2. divisjon group B	2nd	↓ 12	22	2	5	15	13	41	9	Third round	
1984	3. divisjon group F	3rd	3	18	9	4	5	33	21	22	Second round	
1985	3. divisjon group F	3rd	2	18	13	4	1	61	12	30	Second round	
1986	3. divisjon group F	3rd	↑ 1	18	17	1	0	64	10	35	Fourth round	Promoted to 2. divisjon
1987	2. divisjon group B	2nd	7	22	9	4	9	38	33	31	Quarter-final	3 points per win introduced ahead of 1987 season
1988	2. divisjon group B	2nd	6	22	9	3	10	41	37	30	Fourth round	
1989	2. divisjon group B	2nd	↓ 12	22	2	8	12	25	51	14	Third round	Relegated to 3. divisjon
1990	3. divisjon group F	3rd	2	22	15	5	2	64	21	50	Third round	
1991	2. divisjon group 6	3rd ^{1}	↑ 1	22	19	2	1	67	16	59	First round	Promoted to 1. divisjon
1992	1. divisjon group A	2nd	↑ 1	22	16	4	2	69	21	52	Quarter-final	Promoted to Tippeligaen
1993	Tippeligaen	Top	2	22	14	3	5	51	24	45	Winner	
1994	Tippeligaen	Top	10	22	5	7	10	30	46	22	Fourth round	
1995	Tippeligaen	Top	3	26	12	7	7	65	43	43	Fourth round	
1996	Tippeligaen	Top	10	26	9	4	13	44	49	31	Final	
1997	Tippeligaen	Top	7	26	10	7	9	39	34	37	Semi-final	
1998	Tippeligaen	Top	5	26	9	9	8	47	47	36	Quarter-final	
1999	Tippeligaen	Top	9	26	10	4	12	52	54	34	Fourth round	
2000	Tippeligaen	Top	10	26	6	10	10	48	59	28	Semi-final	
2001	Tippeligaen	Top	9	26	7	8	11	45	47	29	Fourth round	
2002	Tippeligaen	Top	10	26	9	4	13	38	41	31	Fourth round	
2003	Tippeligaen	Top	2	26	14	5	7	45	30	47	Final	
2004	Tippeligaen	Top	12	26	7	6	13	28	41	27	Fourth round	Avoided relegation through playoffs
2005	Tippeligaen	Top	↓ 14	26	6	6	14	29	45	24	Fourth round	Relegated to the 1. divisjon
2006	1. divisjon	2nd	5	30	15	7	9	65	49	49	Fourth round	
2007	1. divisjon	2nd	↑ 3	30	17	4	9	66	39	55	Fourth round	Promoted to the Tippeligaen through playoffs
2008	Tippeligaen	Top	4	26	12	6	8	37	38	42	Quarter-final	
2009	Tippeligaen	Top	↓ 15	30	6	10	14	29	53	28	Third round	Relegated to the 1. divisjon
2010	1. divisjon	2nd	6	28	12	6	10	41	28	42	Third round	
2011	1. divisjon	2nd	5	30	15	7	8	52	38	52	Third round	
2012	1. divisjon	2nd	5	30	13	9	8	59	36	48	Quarter-final	
2013	1. divisjon	2nd	↑ 1	30	21	4	5	63	24	67	Quarter-final	Promoted to the Tippeligaen
2014	Tippeligaen	Top	13	30	10	5	15	45	60	35	Fourth round	
2015	Tippeligaen	Top	9	30	12	4	14	53	56	40	Third round	
2016	Tippeligaen	Top	↓ 15	30	8	6	16	36	45	30	Semi-final	Relegated to the 1. divisjon
2017	1. divisjon	2nd	↑ 1	30	22	5	3	83	33	71	Third round	Promoted to the Eliteserien
2018	Eliteserien	Top	11	30	6	14	10	32	35	32	Quarter-final	
2019	Eliteserien	Top	2	30	15	9	6	64	44	54	Second round	
2020	Eliteserien	Top	1	30	26	3	1	103	32	81	Cancelled	
2021	Eliteserien	Top	1	30	18	9	3	59	25	63	Final	
2022	Eliteserien	Top	2	30	18	6	6	86	41	60	Semi-final	
2023	Eliteserien	Top	1	30	22	4	4	78	38	70	Final	
2024	Eliteserien	Top	1	30	18	8	4	71	31	62	Third round	
2025	Eliteserien	Top	2	30	22	4	4	85	28	70	Third round	
2026	Eliteserien (in progress)	Top	1	27	21	2	4	67	25	65	Winner	

^{1} Third tier was renamed as 2. divisjon (Top tier renamed as Tippeligaen, 2nd tier renamed as 1. divisjon) ahead of 1991 season.

=== Europe ===
Bodø/Glimt first participated in European competition in the 1976–77 European Cup Winners' Cup, where they were eliminated by Napoli in the first round. They returned to the competition in 1978–79, defeating Union Luxembourg before losing to Inter Milan in the second round. In 1994–95, they reached the first round after eliminating Olimpija Rīga, and defeated Sampdoria 3–2 in the home leg before losing the tie 4–3 on aggregate. Further UEFA Cup appearances followed in the 1990s and in 2004–05. After a long absence from European competition, Bodø/Glimt returned in 2020–21, reaching the third qualifying round of the UEFA Europa League, where they lost 3–2 to AC Milan in a one-off match at San Siro.

In 2021–22, Bodø/Glimt made their UEFA Champions League debut, losing 5–2 on aggregate to Legia Warsaw in the first qualifying round. They subsequently qualified for the group stage of the inaugural UEFA Europa Conference League, their first appearance in the group stage of a UEFA competition. Bodø/Glimt went unbeaten in the group stage, including a 6–1 home victory over Roma and a 2–2 draw in Rome. They then eliminated Celtic and AZ Alkmaar to reach their first European quarter-final. After defeating Roma 2–1 at home in the first leg, they lost 4–0 in Rome and were eliminated by the eventual champions.

The following season, Bodø/Glimt reached the Champions League play-off round, where they were eliminated 4–2 on aggregate after extra time by Dinamo Zagreb. They subsequently competed in the Europa League group stage before transferring to the Europa Conference League knockout round play-offs, where they lost 1–0 on aggregate to Lech Poznań. In 2023–24, they again progressed from the Conference League group stage, but were eliminated 4–3 on aggregate after extra time by Ajax in the knockout round play-offs.

Bodø/Glimt achieved their best result in UEFA competition to that point in the 2024–25 UEFA Europa League. After finishing ninth in the league phase, they eliminated Twente and Olympiacos before facing Lazio in the quarter-finals. A 2–0 home victory was followed by a 3–1 defeat after extra time in Rome, leaving the tie level at 3–3; Bodø/Glimt won the subsequent penalty shoot-out 3–2. The result made them the first Norwegian club to reach the semi-finals of a senior UEFA men's club competition. They were eliminated by Tottenham Hotspur, losing 5–1 on aggregate.

In 2025–26, Bodø/Glimt qualified for the Champions League proper for the first time after defeating Sturm Graz in the play-off round. They finished 23rd in the league phase, with victories over Manchester City and Atlético Madrid securing a place in the knockout phase play-offs. Bodø/Glimt then defeated Inter Milan 3–1 at home and 2–1 away to advance 5–2 on aggregate, becoming the first Norwegian club to win a Champions League knockout-phase tie. The victory in Milan was their fourth successive win in the competition, another first for a Norwegian club. In the round of 16, Bodø/Glimt defeated Sporting CP 3–0 at home, but were eliminated 5–3 on aggregate after losing the return match 5–0 after extra time.

Bodø/Glimt qualified for the Champions League league phase for a second successive season in 2026–27. They defeated Union Saint-Gilloise 6–5 on aggregate after extra time in the third qualifying round before beating NEC Nijmegen 6–1 on aggregate in the play-off round. In the league phase, Bodø/Glimt began with a 5–0 away defeat against Bayern Munich on 10 September, before securing a 1–0 home victory over Borussia Dortmund on 14 October, with Fredrik Sjøvold scoring the only goal of the match.

==== UEFA competitions record ====
As of 14 October 2026.

Competition	Pld	W	D	L	GF	GA	GD	Win%
UEFA Champions League	36	19	5	12	77	54	+23	52.78
UEFA Cup / UEFA Europa League	37	15	5	17	61	59	+2	40.54
UEFA Europa Conference League	34	19	9	6	69	37	+32	55.88
UEFA Cup Winners' Cup	10	3	1	6	14	16	−2	30
Total	117	56	20	41	221	166	+55	47.86

Season	Competition	Round	Club	Home	Away	Aggregate
1976–77	European Cup Winners' Cup	First round	(Italy) Napoli	0–2	0–1	0–3
1978–79	European Cup Winners' Cup	First round	Union Luxembourg	4–1	0–1	4–2
1978–79	European Cup Winners' Cup	Second round	(Italy) Internazionale	1–2	0–5	1–7
1994–95	UEFA Cup Winners' Cup	Qualifying round	(Latvia) Olimpija Rīga	6–0	0–0	6–0
1994–95	UEFA Cup Winners' Cup	First round	(Italy) Sampdoria	3–2	0–2	3–4
1996–97	UEFA Cup	Qualifying round	(Israel) Beitar Jerusalem	2–1	5–1	7–2
1996–97	UEFA Cup	First round	(Turkey) Trabzonspor	1–2	1–3	2–5
1999–2000	UEFA Cup	Qualifying round	(Liechtenstein) Vaduz	1–0	2–1	3–1
1999–2000	UEFA Cup	First round	(Germany) Werder Bremen	0–5	1–1	1–6
2004–05	UEFA Cup	Second qualifying round	(Estonia) Levadia Tallinn	2–1	1–2	3–3 (8–7 p)
2004–05	UEFA Cup	First round	(Turkey) Beşiktaş	1–1	0–1	1–2
2020–21	UEFA Europa League	First qualifying round	(Lithuania) Kauno Žalgiris	6–1	—N/a	—N/a
2020–21	UEFA Europa League	Second qualifying round	(Lithuania) Žalgiris	3–1	—N/a	—N/a
2020–21	UEFA Europa League	Third qualifying round	(Italy) Milan	—N/a	2–3	—N/a
2021–22	UEFA Champions League	First qualifying round	(Poland) Legia Warsaw	2–3	0–2	2–5
2021–22	UEFA Europa Conference League	Second qualifying round	(Iceland) Valur	3–0	3–0	6–0
2021–22	UEFA Europa Conference League	Third qualifying round	(Kosovo) Prishtina	2–0	1–2	3–2
2021–22	UEFA Europa Conference League	Play-off round	(Lithuania) Žalgiris	1–0	2–2	3–2
2021–22	UEFA Europa Conference League	Group C	(Italy) Roma	6–1	2–2	2nd place
2021–22	UEFA Europa Conference League	Group C	(Ukraine) Zorya Luhansk	3–1	1–1	2nd place
2021–22	UEFA Europa Conference League	Group C	(Bulgaria) CSKA Sofia	2–0	0–0	2nd place
2021–22	UEFA Europa Conference League	Knockout round play-offs	(Scotland) Celtic	2–0	3–1	5–1
2021–22	UEFA Europa Conference League	Round of 16	(Netherlands) AZ	2–1	2–2 (a.e.t)	4–3
2021–22	UEFA Europa Conference League	Quarter-finals	(Italy) Roma	2–1	0–4	2–5
2022–23	UEFA Champions League	First qualifying round	(Faroe Islands) KÍ Klaksvík	3–0	1–3	4–3
2022–23	UEFA Champions League	Second qualifying round	(Northern Ireland) Linfield	8–0	0–1	8–1
2022–23	UEFA Champions League	Third qualifying round	(Lithuania) Žalgiris	5–0	1–1	6–1
2022–23	UEFA Champions League	Play-off round	(Croatia) Dinamo Zagreb	1–0	1–4 (a.e.t)	2–4
2022–23	UEFA Europa League	Group A	(England) Arsenal	0–1	0–3	3rd place
2022–23	UEFA Europa League	Group A	(Netherlands) PSV Eindhoven	1–2	1–1	3rd place
2022–23	UEFA Europa League	Group A	(Switzerland) Zürich	2–1	1–2	3rd place
2022–23	UEFA Europa Conference League	Knockout round play-offs	(Poland) Lech Poznań	0–0	0–1	0–1
2023–24	UEFA Europa Conference League	Second qualifying round	(Czech Republic) Bohemians 1905	3–0	4–2	7–2
2023–24	UEFA Europa Conference League	Third qualifying round	(Armenia) Pyunik	3–0	3–0	6–0
2023–24	UEFA Europa Conference League	Play-off round	(Romania) Sepsi OSK	3–2 (a.e.t.)	2–2	5–4
2023–24	UEFA Europa Conference League	Group D	(Belgium) Club Brugge	0–1	1–3	2nd place
2023–24	UEFA Europa Conference League	Group D	(Turkey) Beşiktaş	3–1	2–1	2nd place
2023–24	UEFA Europa Conference League	Group D	(Switzerland) Lugano	5–2	0–0	2nd place
2023–24	UEFA Europa Conference League	Knockout round play-offs	(Netherlands) Ajax	1–2 (a.e.t.)	2–2	3–4
2024–25	UEFA Champions League	Second qualifying round	(Latvia) RFS	4–0	3–1	7–1
2024–25	UEFA Champions League	Third qualifying round	(Poland) Jagiellonia Białystok	4–1	1–0	5–1
2024–25	UEFA Champions League	Play-off round	(Serbia) Red Star Belgrade	2–1	0–2	2–3
2024–25	UEFA Europa League	League phase	(Portugal) Porto	3–2	—N/a	9th place
2024–25	UEFA Europa League	League phase	(Belgium) Union Saint-Gilloise	—N/a	0–0	9th place
2024–25	UEFA Europa League	League phase	(Portugal) Braga	—N/a	2–1	9th place
2024–25	UEFA Europa League	League phase	(Azerbaijan) Qarabağ	1–2	—N/a	9th place
2024–25	UEFA Europa League	League phase	(England) Manchester United	—N/a	2–3	9th place
2024–25	UEFA Europa League	League phase	(Turkey) Beşiktaş	2–1	—N/a	9th place
2024–25	UEFA Europa League	League phase	(Israel) Maccabi Tel Aviv	3–1	—N/a	9th place
2024–25	UEFA Europa League	League phase	(France) Nice	—N/a	1–1	9th place
2024–25	UEFA Europa League	Knockout round play-offs	(Netherlands) Twente	5–2 (a.e.t.)	1–2	6–4
2024–25	UEFA Europa League	Round of 16	(Greece) Olympiacos	3–0	1–2	4–2
2024–25	UEFA Europa League	Quarter-finals	(Italy) Lazio	2–0	1–3 (a.e.t.)	3–3 (3–2 p)
2024–25	UEFA Europa League	Semi-finals	(England) Tottenham Hotspur	0–2	1–3	1–5
2025–26	UEFA Champions League	Play-off round	(Austria) Sturm Graz	5–0	1–2	6–2
2025–26	UEFA Champions League	League phase	(Czech Republic) Slavia Prague	—N/a	2–2	23rd place
2025–26	UEFA Champions League	League phase	(England) Tottenham Hotspur	2–2	—N/a	23rd place
2025–26	UEFA Champions League	League phase	(Turkey) Galatasaray	—N/a	1–3	23rd place
2025–26	UEFA Champions League	League phase	(France) Monaco	0–1	—N/a	23rd place
2025–26	UEFA Champions League	League phase	(Italy) Juventus	2–3	—N/a	23rd place
2025–26	UEFA Champions League	League phase	(Germany) Borussia Dortmund	—N/a	2–2	23rd place
2025–26	UEFA Champions League	League phase	(England) Manchester City	3–1	—N/a	23rd place
2025–26	UEFA Champions League	League phase	(Spain) Atlético Madrid	—N/a	2–1	23rd place
2025–26	UEFA Champions League	Knockout phase play-offs	(Italy) Internazionale	3–1	2–1	5–2
2025–26	UEFA Champions League	Round of 16	(Portugal) Sporting CP	3–0	0–5	3–5
2026–27	UEFA Champions League	Third qualifying round	(Belgium) Union Saint-Gilloise	3–2 (a.e.t.)	3–3	6–5
2026–27	UEFA Champions League	Play-off round	(Netherlands) NEC Nijmegen	3–0	3–1	6–1
2026–27	UEFA Champions League	League phase	(Germany) Bayern Munich	—N/a	0–5	In progress
2026–27	UEFA Champions League	League phase	(Germany) Borussia Dortmund	1–0	—N/a	In progress
2026–27	UEFA Champions League	League phase	(Italy) Napoli	—N/a		In progress
2026–27	UEFA Champions League	League phase	(France) Lille		—N/a	In progress
2026–27	UEFA Champions League	League phase	(Austria) LASK		—N/a	In progress
2026–27	UEFA Champions League	League phase	(France) Lens	—N/a		In progress
2026–27	UEFA Champions League	League phase	(Spain) Atlético Madrid		—N/a	In progress
2026–27	UEFA Champions League	League phase	(Belgium) Club Brugge	—N/a		In progress

==== UEFA Club Ranking ====
As of 17 October 2026.

Rank	Team	Coeff.
30	(Greece) Olympiacos	58.250
31	(France) Lille	57.750
32	(Norway) Bodø/Glimt	57.000
33	(Italy) Juventus	56.250
34	(Netherlands) Feyenoord	55.000

== Current squad ==
As of 6 September 2026

Note: Flags indicate national team as defined under FIFA eligibility rules; some limited exceptions apply. Players may hold more than one non-FIFA nationality.

No.	Pos.	Nation	Player
1	GK	NOR	Julian Faye Lund
2	DF	DEN	Villads Nielsen
4	DF	NOR	Odin Bjørtuft
5	DF	NOR	Haitam Aleesami
6	DF	NOR	Jostein Gundersen
7	MF	NOR	Patrick Berg (captain)
8	MF	NOR	Sondre Auklend
9	FW	NOR	Andreas Helmersen
10	FW	NOR	Jens Petter Hauge
11	FW	NOR	Ole Didrik Blomberg
12	GK	RUS	Nikita Haikin
14	MF	NOR	Ulrik Saltnes
15	DF	NOR	Fredrik André Bjørkan

No.	Pos.	Nation	Player
16	MF	NOR	Joshua Kitolano
17	FW	NOR	Ola Brynhildsen
19	MF	NOR	Sondre Brunstad Fet
20	DF	NOR	Fredrik Sjøvold
22	FW	NOR	Joel Mvuka
23	MF	NOR	Magnus Riisnæs
25	DF	NOR	Isak Dybvik Määttä
26	MF	NOR	Håkon Evjen
28	MF	GAM	Assan Sanyang
32	DF	NOR	Kasper Solhaug
43	GK	NOR	Martin Lund Andersen
45	GK	NOR	Isak Sjong
94	FW	NOR	August Mikkelsen

For season transfers, see transfers winter 2025–26 and transfers summer 2026.

=== Out on loan ===
Note: Flags indicate national team as defined under FIFA eligibility rules; some limited exceptions apply. Players may hold more than one non-FIFA nationality.

No.	Pos.	Nation	Player
—	MF	NOR	Syver Skeide (at Kristiansund until 31 December 2026)
—	FW	SWE	Samuel Burakovsky (at Östers until 31 December 2026)

No.	Pos.	Nation	Player
—	FW	NGR	Gift Sunday (at KTP until 31 December 2026)

== Coaching staff ==
Role	Name
Manager	Kjetil Knutsen
Coach	Martin Reier
Coach	Jo Nymo Matland
Goalkeeping coach	Jonas Ueland Kolstad
Coach / fitness coach	Ørjan Nygård
Coach	Eirik Kolstad
Fitness coach	Jakob Kjos Vollstad
Fitness coach	Robert Rydningen

== Administrative staff ==
Role	Name
Chairman	(Norway) Inge Henning Andersen
Managing director	(Norway) Frode Thomassen

== Managers ==
- (Norway) Jørgen Juve (1939)
- (Norway) Arvid Halvorsen (1963–1965)
- (Norway) Andreas Berg (1965–1969)
- (Austria) Karl Adamek (1970)
- (Norway) Andreas Berg (1971–1975)
- (Norway) Odd Bjørn Kristoffersen (1975–1977)
- (Netherlands) René van Eck (1978)
- (Norway) Odd Bjørn Kristoffersen (1978)
- (Norway) Erik Ruthford Pedersen (1979–1980)
- (England) Joe Hooley (1981)
- (Norway) Harald Berg (1981)
- (Norway) Odd Bjørn Kristoffersen (1981)
- (Norway) Truls Klausen (1982)
- (Norway) Andreas Berg (1983)
- (Norway) Harald Berg (1983)
- (Norway) Jacob Klette (1984)
- (Norway) Øystein Gåre (1985–1989)
- (Norway) Odd Bjørn Kristoffersen (1989–1990)
- (Norway) Jan Muri (1991)
- (Norway) Trond Sollied (1992–1996)
- (Norway) Øystein Gåre (1997–1998)
- (Norway) Dag Opjordsmoen (1999–2001)
- (Norway) Øystein Gåre (2001–2004)
- (Norway) Kent Bergersen (2005–2007)
- (Norway) Kåre Ingebrigtsen (2008–2011)
- (Norway) Cato André Hansen (2011–2012)
- (Norway) Jan Halvor Halvorsen (2013–2015)
- (Norway) Aasmund Bjørkan (2015–2017)
- (Norway) Kjetil Knutsen (2018–)

== Club symbols and structures ==
=== Stadium ===
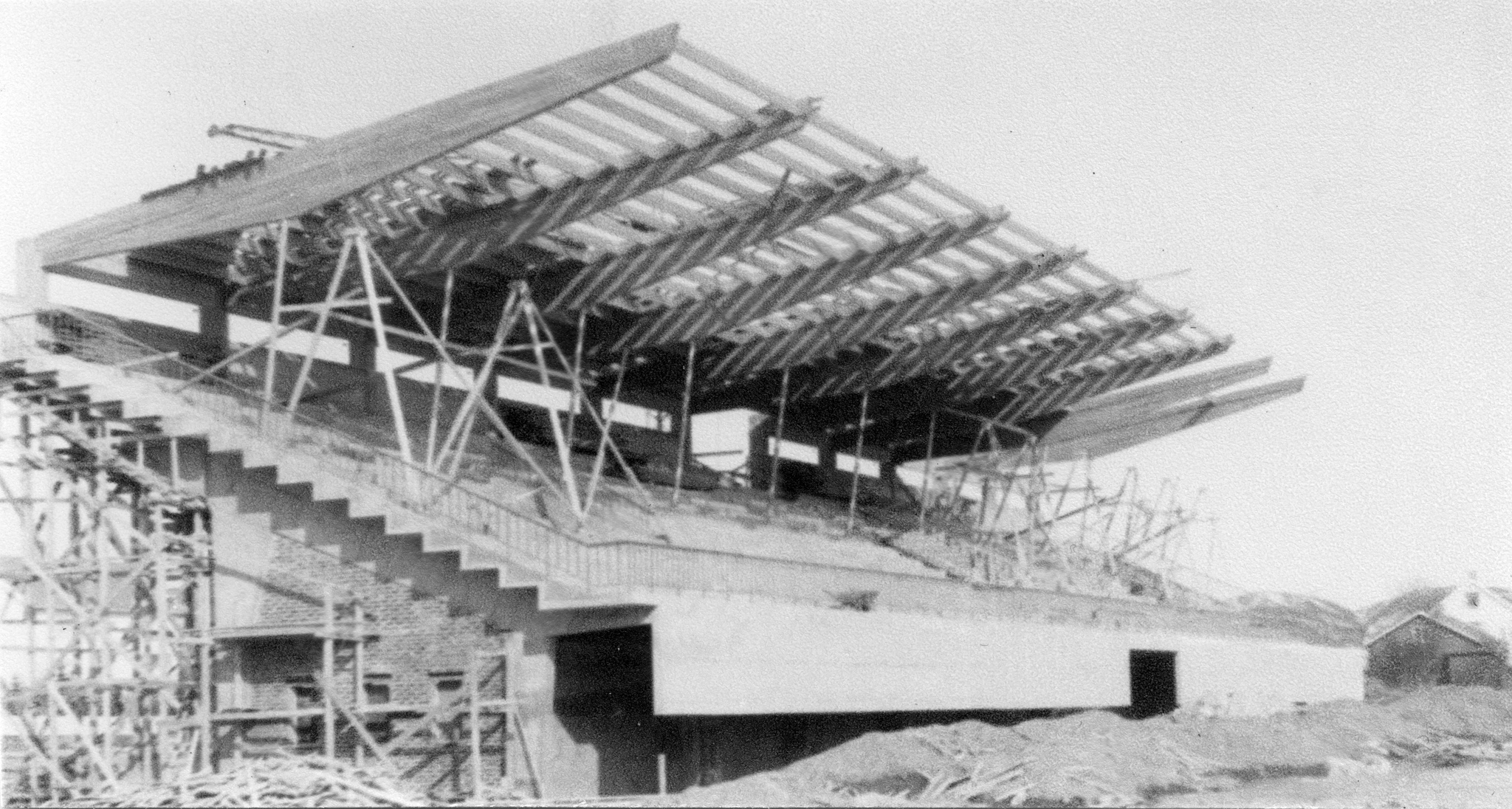
Construction of Aspmyra's main stand in 1966.

Bodø/Glimt have played their home matches at Aspmyra Stadion since it opened in 1966. The ground is located south of central Bodø, close to Bodø Airport, and is owned by Bodø Municipality. Originally developed as a municipal multi-purpose stadium, Aspmyra was substantially redeveloped around the 2000's, with an expansion completed in 2001 as the venue developed into a football-specific stadium. The natural-grass pitch was replaced by artificial turf in 2006. Aspmyra has a capacity of approximately 8,200 spectators.

Its attendance record was a Norwegian Football Cup match against Viking FK in 1975, in which more than 12,000 spectators attended.

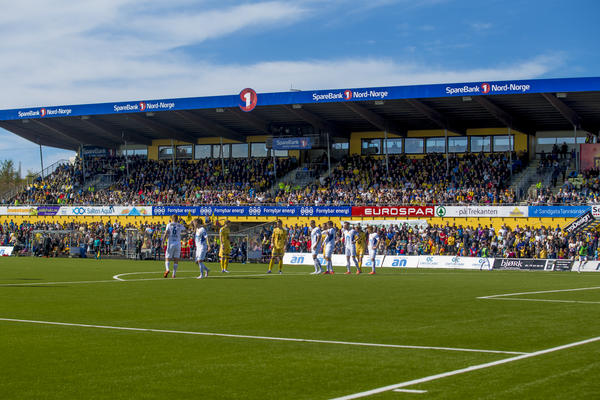
The SNN stand at Aspmyra in 2016.

Plans for a replacement for Aspmyra developed during the early 2020s. An initial proposal, known as Bodø Storstue, envisioned a substantially larger multi-purpose development at Thalleåkeren. The project was later abandoned in that form and replaced by a scaled-down stadium project, referred to by the club as Ny Arena, with greater emphasis on facilities required for football and club operations.

The new stadium is being built at Thalleåkeren, approximately 1.5 kilometres east of central Bodø. The approved zoning plan, formally named Nordland idrettspark, provides for a 10,000-seat football stadium meeting FIFA and UEFA requirements. The surrounding planning area also includes a public park, a seven-a-side football pitch and limited provision for sports-related commercial and office uses.

Bodø/Glimt's members approved the investment in the stadium and the relocation of the club's activities from Aspmyra at an extraordinary general meeting in September 2025. Bodø City Council approved the detailed zoning plan later that month, and the decision became final following the rejection of an appeal by the County Governor of Nordland in April 2026. The club plans to move to the new stadium in 2027.

The design was selected through a price and design competition won by contractor Consto together with Nordic Office of Architecture and Arup. The consortium used Arctic Arena as its project name for the proposal, but Bodø/Glimt have stated that this is not the final name of the stadium. The club's members have approved the possibility of a commercial naming partner, provided that the eventual name reflects the club's history, Arctic identity and connection to the region.

=== Kit ===
In 1980, the club signed its first kit-manufacturer deal with the German firm Adidas, though the club used training jackets and shorts from Adidas since 1976. Nordlandsbanken, a major bank in the region, was one of the main sponsor of the club, present on their shirts until 2011.

Since the 2007 season, Diadora has been manufacturing the kits, giving the club a clean, minimalistic design. In October 2023, FK Bodø/Glimt signed a new manufacturer deal with Puma.

1950–1966
1967–1973
1974–

==== Sponsorship ====
Period	Kit manufacturer	Shirt sponsor
1980	Adidas	—N/a
1981–2006	Adidas	Nordlandsbanken
2007–2010	Diadora	Nordlandsbanken
2011–2023	Diadora	SpareBank 1 Nord-Norge
2024–	Puma	SpareBank 1 Nord-Norge

=== Supporters ===
Bodø/Glimt have a long tradition of organised support, closely associated with the club's role as a symbol of northern Norwegian identity. A distinct supporter culture developed around the club during its rise in the 1970s. Glimt's supporters became particularly prominent during the 1975 season, when thousands of supporters travelled to Oslo for the Norwegian Cup final. The support surrounding Glimt's breakthrough also carried a wider regional significance, as northern Norwegian clubs had only recently been given equal access to national competitions.

Singing and the colour yellow have remained central elements of Bodø/Glimt's supporter culture. Å eg veit meg eit land, based on the song Barndomsminne fra Nordland, has been sung by Glimt supporters since at least the 1960s and is commonly performed with scarves raised before and during matches at Aspmyra. Another distinctive symbol is the oversized yellow toothbrush carried by the supporters. The tradition developed in the 1970s, when supporter leader Arnulf Bendixen used a toothbrush to conduct the singing section. After a representative of the Norwegian dental-care company Jordan noticed the practice, a giant toothbrush was produced for the supporters. The toothbrush has since become one of the most recognisable symbols of Bodø/Glimt's supporter culture, and visiting captains have traditionally been presented with a yellow toothbrush before matches at Aspmyra.

The principal organised supporter group in Bodø is J-feltet, named after the standing section of Aspmyra in which the club's most vocal home support traditionally congregated. J-feltet developed from the supporter environment that had previously included Den Gule Horde and 1916. The supporter section was expanded into part of the neighbouring K section in 2023 in response to growing demand. Glimt i Sør, based primarily in Oslo and eastern Norway, organises supporters living outside Northern Norway and has become particularly prominent at away matches and European fixtures.

Bodø/Glimt's supporter community also includes a number of regional and local groupings. These have included Glimt i Midten, centred around Trondheim; Glimt i Vest in western Norway; and Glimt i Steigen, a supporter community associated with Steigen in Nordland. In addition to formally organised supporter clubs, the club has a broader network of local and regional supporter communities throughout Norway. The geographical spread reflects Bodø/Glimt's historical support beyond Bodø itself, particularly across Northern Norway and among people from the region living elsewhere in the country.

The club's domestic and European success from 2020 onward was accompanied by substantial growth in supporter activity at Aspmyra and on away trips. J-feltet and Glimt i Sør have played leading roles in organising singing support, while regional supporter groups have contributed to increasingly large travelling contingents in Norway and Europe. In 2022, Bodø/Glimt's supporters collectively received the Årets nordlending ("Northern Norwegian of the Year") award from Avisa Nordland and NRK Nordland. The jury highlighted the atmosphere created by the supporters, their conduct while travelling and their role in developing an inclusive supporter community, describing the movement as extending across northern, central, southern and western Norway.

== Women's team ==
Bodø/Glimt also has a women's team, which currently compete: in the Toppserien, the top division of women's football in Norway.
