= Alioune Ndoye =

Senegalese footballer (born 2001)

Personal information
- Date of birth: 5 October 2001 (age 25)
- Place of birth: Rufisque, Senegal
- Height: 1.94 m (6 ft 4 in)
- Position: Forward

Team information
- Current team: Vitória Guimarães
- Number: 90

Youth career
- Teungueth

Senior career*
Years	Team	Apps	(Gls)
–2020	Teungueth		
2020–2025	Valmiera	83	(26)
2025	Servette	15	(6)
2025–	Vitória Guimarães	24	(2)
- * Club domestic league appearances and goals as of 25 May 2026

Alioune Ndoye (born 5 October 2001) is a Senegalese professional footballer who plays as a forward for Primeira Liga club Vitória Guimarães.

== Early life ==
Ndoye was born on 5 October 2001. Born in Rufisque, Senegal, he is a native of the city.

== Career ==
Ndoye started his career with Senegalese side Teungueth. Following his stint there, he signed for Latvian side Valmiera, where he mae eighty-three league appearances and scored twenty-six goals and helped the club win the league title.

During January 2025, he was sent on loan to Swiss side Servette, where he scored three goals in his first five appearances.

Ahead of the 2025–26 season, Ndoye signed for Portuguese side Vitória Guimarães. On 6 January 2026, during a Taça da Liga semifinal, as Vitória were losing 1–0 to Sporting CP, he came on as a substitute and scored a brace, securing a place in the final for the first time in the club's history. Four days later, in the final, he scored a late winner in a comeback 2–1 victory over rivals Braga, helping Vitória Guimarães secure their first ever Taça da Liga and their first trophy in over 12 years.

== Honours ==
Vitória Guimarães

- Taça da Liga: 2025–26
