= Lucas Macula =

Brazilian footballer (born 2000)

Personal information
- Full name: Lucas Ribeiro de Oliveira
- Date of birth: 12 June 2000 (age 26)
- Place of birth: Brazil
- Position: Midfielder

Team information
- Current team: Birkirkara
- Number: 77

Senior career*
Years	Team	Apps	(Gls)
2018–2020	Fluminense	1	(0)
2020–2022	Estoril	0	(0)
2022	Maccabi Ahi Nazareth	8	(1)
2022–2023	Marsa	15	(10)
2023–2025	Gzira United	39	(9)
2024	→ Ventforet Kofu (loan)	6	(0)
2025–	Birkirkara	8	(1)
- * Club domestic league appearances and goals as of 6 October 2025

Lucas Ribeiro de Oliveira (born 10 June 2000), commonly known as Lucas Macula, is a Brazilian footballer who currently plays as a midfielder for Birkirkara.

== Career statistics ==
=== Club ===
As of 12 June 2018.

Club	Season	League			Cup		Continental		Other		Total	
Club	Season	Division	Apps	Goals	Apps	Goals	Apps	Goals	Apps	Goals	Apps	Goals
Fluminense	2018	Série A	1	0	0	0	–		1 (Note: Appearances in the Campeonato Carioca)	0	1	0
Career total			1	0	0	0	0	0	1	0	1	0
