= Visar Kastrati =

Kosovan referee

- Kastrati in 2026
- Born: 24 October 1986 (age 40); Prizren, Kosovo
- Height: 1.82 m (6 ft 0 in)
- Other occupation: Software engineer

Domestic
Years	League	Role
2010–	FFK	Referee
2017–	Superleague	Referee
2021–	FFK	VAR

International
Years	League	Role
2020–	FIFA listed	Referee
2024–	FIFA listed	VAR

Visar Kastrati is a Kosovan football referee. He has been a FIFA listed referee since 2020 and is ranked as a UEFA second category referee. Starting at 2024, Kastrati has been a FIFA listed as Video Match Official.

In 2024 and 2023, Kastrati was awarded by Football Federation of Kosova as the "Best Referee of the Year".

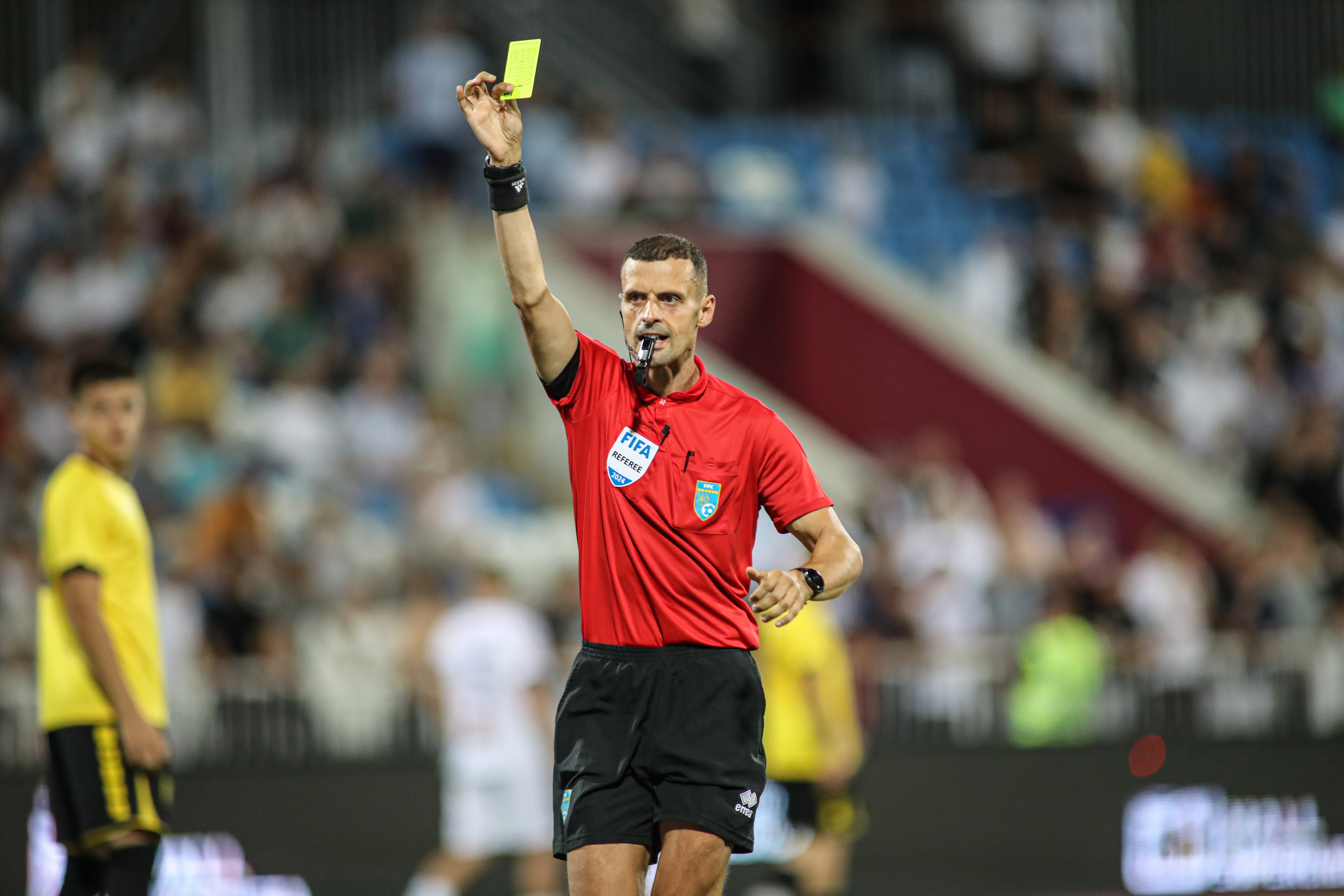
Visar Kastrati in 2024

For two years in a row (2023 and 2022), he was named "Best Sports Referee of the Year" by the local Municipality in Prishtina.

== Refereeing career ==
Kastrati has been promoted as a referee in the Kosovo Superliga, the national top-flight, during the 2016–17 season and his debut match was FC Besa vs KF Hajvalia on 8 March 2017. In the same season, he started attending UEFA’s Centre of Refereeing Excellence (CORE) program, and eventually became a FIFA Referee in 2020 and FIFA VAR in 2024.

On 13 October 2020, Kastrati refereed his first international match, taking charge of a 2021 European Under-21 Championship qualifier between Romania and Malta.

In September 2022, Kastrati was appointed to referee the 2022–23 UEFA Europa Conference League group stage match between Gent and Shamrock Rovers.

In June 2023, he refereed Kosovo Cup Final match between SC Gjilani and FC Prishtina. A day before, he refereed Relegation match between FC Ferizaj and FC Liria.

In August 2021, he has been a VAR on Kosovo Supercup, which was the first match played with VAR in Kosovo.

== Personal life ==
Kastrati has a degree of Master of Science in Software Engineering and Telecommunications at the University of Sheffield. Beyond refereeing, he works as a Head of the Electoral Information Technology Division at the Central Election Commission in Kosovo.

Since 2021, he also works as a lead VAR instructor for the Football Federation of Kosovo.
