= 2023–24 UEFA Champions League =

European football tournament

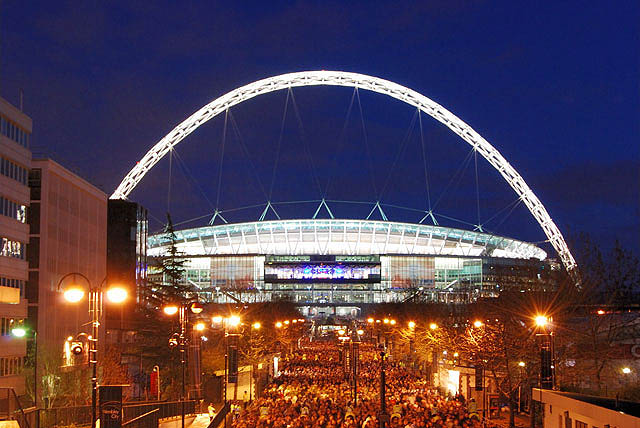
- Wembley Stadium in London hosted the final

Tournament details
- Dates: Qualifying: 27 June – 30 August 2023; Competition proper: 19 September 2023 – 1 June 2024
- Teams: Competition proper: 32; Total: 78 (from 53 associations)

Final positions
- Champions: (Spain) Real Madrid (15th title)
- Runners-up: (Germany) Borussia Dortmund

Tournament statistics
- Matches played: 125
- Goals scored: 375 (3 per match)
- Attendance: 6,511,191 (52,090 per match)
- Top scorer(s): Harry Kane (Bayern Munich); Kylian Mbappé (Paris Saint-Germain); 8 goals each
- Best player: Vinícius Júnior (Real Madrid)
- Best young player: Jude Bellingham (Real Madrid)

The 2023–24 UEFA Champions League was the 69th season of Europe's premier club football tournament organised by UEFA, and the 32nd season since it was renamed from the European Champion Clubs' Cup to the UEFA Champions League.

Real Madrid defeated Borussia Dortmund 2–0 in the final, which was played at the Wembley Stadium in London, England, for a record-extending 15th European Cup title, and their sixth in eleven years. As winners, Real Madrid earned the right to play against Atalanta, the winners of the 2023–24 UEFA Europa League, in the 2024 UEFA Super Cup. They also qualified for the brand-new 2024 FIFA Intercontinental Cup final and the expanded 2025 FIFA Club World Cup in the United States.

This edition was the final season with the format of 32 teams participating in the group stage, after UEFA announced that a brand new format would be introduced for the following edition.

Manchester City were the defending champions, but were eliminated by eventual winners Real Madrid in the quarter-finals.

== Association team allocation ==
A total of 78 teams from 53 of the 55 UEFA member associations participated in the 2023–24 UEFA Champions League (the exceptions being Liechtenstein, which did not organise a domestic league, and Russia). The association ranking based on the UEFA association coefficients was used to determine the number of participating teams for each association:

- Associations 1–4 each had four teams qualify.
- Associations 5–6 each had three teams qualify.
- Associations 7–15 (except Russia) each had two teams qualify.
- Associations 16–55 (except Liechtenstein) each had one team qualify.
- The winners of the 2022–23 UEFA Champions League and 2022–23 UEFA Europa League were each given an additional entry if they did not qualify for the 2023–24 UEFA Champions League through their domestic league.

=== Association ranking ===
For the 2023–24 UEFA Champions League, the associations were allocated places according to their 2022 UEFA association coefficients, which took into account their performance in European competitions from 2017–18 to 2021–22. The team allocation reflected Russia's ongoing suspension from UEFA competitions.

Apart from the allocation based on the association coefficients, associations could have additional teams (a maximum of 5 per association) participating in the Champions League, as noted below:

- (UEL) – Additional berth for UEFA Europa League title holders

Association ranking for 2023–24 UEFA Champions League

Rank	Association	Coeff.	Teams	Notes
1	England	106.641	4	
2	Spain	96.141	4	+1 (UEL)
3	Italy	76.902	4	
4	Germany	75.213	4	
5	France	60.081	3	
6	Portugal	53.382	3	
7	Netherlands	49.300	2	
8	Austria	38.850	2	
9	Scotland	36.900	2	
10	Russia	34.482	0	
11	Serbia	33.375	2	
12	Ukraine	31.800	2	
13	Belgium	30.600	2	
14	Switzerland	29.675	2	
15	Greece	28.200	2	
16	Czech Republic	27.800	1	
17	Norway	27.250	1	
18	Denmark	27.175	1	
19	Croatia	27.150	1	

Rank	Association	Coeff.	Teams	Notes
20	Turkey	27.100	1	
21	Cyprus	26.375	1	
22	Israel	24.375	1	
23	Sweden	22.875	1	
24	Bulgaria	19.500	1	
25	Romania	17.150	1	
26	Azerbaijan	17.000	1	
27	Hungary	16.375	1	
28	Poland	15.875	1	
29	Kazakhstan	15.750	1	
30	Slovakia	15.625	1	
31	Slovenia	15.000	1	
32	Belarus	12.500	1	
33	Moldova	11.250	1	
34	Lithuania	10.000	1	
35	Bosnia and Herzegovina	9.125	1	
36	Finland	8.875	1	
37	Luxembourg	8.750	1	
38	Latvia	8.625	1	

Rank	Association	Coeff.	Teams	Notes
39	Kosovo	8.166	1	
40	Republic of Ireland	8.125	1	
41	Armenia	8.125	1	
42	Northern Ireland	8.083	1	
43	Albania	8.000	1	
44	Faroe Islands	7.250	1	
45	Estonia	7.041	1	
46	Malta	7.000	1	
47	Georgia	7.000	1	
48	North Macedonia	7.000	1	
49	Liechtenstein	6.500	0	
50	Wales	5.500	1	
51	Gibraltar	5.416	1	
52	Iceland	5.375	1	
53	Montenegro	4.875	1	
54	Andorra	4.665	1	
55	San Marino	1.332	1	

=== Distribution ===
The following is the default access list for the 2023–24 season.

Access list for 2023–24 UEFA Champions League
		Teams entering in this round	Teams advancing from previous round
Preliminary round (4 teams)		4 champions from associations 52–55	—N/a
First qualifying round (30 teams)		29 champions from associations 22–51 (except Liechtenstein)	1 winner from the preliminary round
Second qualifying round (24 teams)	Champions Path (20 teams)	5 champions from associations 17–21	15 winners from the first qualifying round
Second qualifying round (24 teams)	League Path (4 teams)	4 runners-up from associations 12–15	—N/a
Third qualifying round (20 teams)	Champions Path (12 teams)	2 champions from associations 15–16	10 winners from the second qualifying round (Champions Path)
Third qualifying round (20 teams)	League Path (8 teams)	4 runners-up from associations 7–11 (except Russia); 2 third-placed teams from associations 5–6	2 winners from the second qualifying round (League Path)
Play-off round (12 teams)	Champions Path (8 teams)	2 champions from associations 13–14	6 winners from the third qualifying round (Champions Path)
Play-off round (12 teams)	League Path (4 teams)	—N/a	4 winners from the third qualifying round (League Path)
Group stage (32 teams)		Europa League title holder; 11 champions from associations 1–12 (except Russia); 6 runners-up from associations 1–6; 4 third-placed teams from associations 1–4; 4 fourth-placed teams from associations 1–4	4 winners from the play-off round (Champions Path); 2 winners from the play-off round (League Path)
Knockout phase (16 teams)		—N/a	8 group winners from the group stage; 8 group runners-up from the group stage

Due to the suspension of Russia for the 2023–24 European season, the following changes to the access list were made:

- The champions of association 11 (Serbia) entered the group stage instead of the play-off round (Champions Path).
- The champions of association 13 (Belgium) entered the play-off round instead of the third qualifying round (Champions Path).
- The champions of association 15 (Greece) entered the third qualifying round instead of the second qualifying round (Champions Path).
- The champions of associations 18 (Denmark) and 19 (Croatia) entered the second qualifying round instead of the first qualifying round (Champions Path).
- The runner-up of association 11 (Serbia) entered the third qualifying round instead of the second qualifying round (League Path).

Since the Champions League title holders (Manchester City) qualified via their domestic league, the following changes to the access list were made:

- The champions of association 12 (Ukraine) entered the group stage instead of the play-off round (Champions Path).
- The champions of association 14 (Switzerland) entered the play-off round instead of the third qualifying round (Champions Path).
- The champions of association 16 (Czech Republic) entered the third qualifying round instead of the second qualifying round (Champions Path).
- The champions of associations 20 (Turkey) and 21 (Cyprus) entered the second qualifying round instead of the first qualifying round (Champions Path).

=== Teams ===
The labels in the parentheses show how each team qualified for the place of its starting round:

- TH: Champions League title holders
- EL: Europa League title holders
- 1st, 2nd, 3rd, 4th: League positions of the previous season

The second qualifying round, third qualifying round and play-off round were divided into Champions Path (CH) and League Path (LP).

Qualified teams for 2023–24 UEFA Champions League
Entry round		Teams			
Group stage		(England) Manchester City (1st)^{TH}	(Spain) Sevilla (EL)	(England) Arsenal (2nd)	(England) Manchester United (3rd)
Group stage		(England) Newcastle United (4th)	(Spain) Barcelona (1st)	(Spain) Real Madrid (2nd)	(Spain) Atlético Madrid (3rd)
Group stage		(Spain) Real Sociedad (4th)	(Italy) Napoli (1st)	(Italy) Lazio (2nd)	(Italy) Inter Milan (3rd)
Group stage		(Italy) Milan (4th)	(Germany) Bayern Munich (1st)	(Germany) Borussia Dortmund (2nd)	(Germany) RB Leipzig (3rd)
Group stage		(Germany) Union Berlin (4th)	(France) Paris Saint-Germain (1st)	(France) Lens (2nd)	(Portugal) Benfica (1st)
Group stage		(Portugal) Porto (2nd)	(Netherlands) Feyenoord (1st)	(Austria) Red Bull Salzburg (1st)	(Scotland) Celtic (1st)
Group stage		(Serbia) Red Star Belgrade (1st)	(Ukraine) Shakhtar Donetsk (1st)		
Play-off round	CH	(Belgium) Antwerp (1st)	(Switzerland) Young Boys (1st)		
Third qualifying round	CH	(Greece) AEK Athens (1st)	(Czech Republic) Sparta Prague (1st)		
Third qualifying round	LP	(France) Marseille (3rd)	(Portugal) Braga (3rd)	(Netherlands) PSV Eindhoven (2nd)	(Austria) Sturm Graz (2nd)
Third qualifying round	LP	(Scotland) Rangers (2nd)	(Serbia) TSC (2nd)		
Second qualifying round	CH	(Norway) Molde (1st)	(Denmark) Copenhagen (1st)	(Croatia) Dinamo Zagreb (1st)	(Turkey) Galatasaray (1st)
Second qualifying round	CH	(Cyprus) Aris Limassol (1st)			
Second qualifying round	LP	(Ukraine) Dnipro-1 (2nd)	(Belgium) Genk (2nd)	(Switzerland) Servette (2nd)	(Greece) Panathinaikos (2nd)
First qualifying round		(Israel) Maccabi Haifa (1st)	(Sweden) BK Häcken (1st)	(Bulgaria) Ludogorets Razgrad (1st)	(Romania) Farul Constanța (1st)
First qualifying round		(Azerbaijan) Qarabağ (1st)	(Hungary) Ferencváros (1st)	(Poland) Raków Częstochowa (1st)	(Kazakhstan) Astana (1st)
First qualifying round		(Slovakia) Slovan Bratislava (1st)	(Slovenia) Olimpija Ljubljana (1st)	(Belarus) BATE Borisov (3rd)	(Moldova) Sheriff Tiraspol (1st)
First qualifying round		(Lithuania) Žalgiris (1st)	(Bosnia and Herzegovina) Zrinjski Mostar (1st)	(Finland) HJK (1st)	(Luxembourg) Swift Hesperange (1st)
First qualifying round		(Latvia) Valmiera (1st)	(Kosovo) Ballkani (1st)	(Republic of Ireland) Shamrock Rovers (1st)	(Armenia) Urartu (1st)
First qualifying round		(Northern Ireland) Larne (1st)	(Albania) Partizani (1st)	(Faroe Islands) KÍ (1st)	(Estonia) Flora (1st)
First qualifying round		(Malta) Hamrun Spartans (1st)	(Georgia (country)) Dinamo Tbilisi (1st)	(North Macedonia) Struga (1st)	(Wales) The New Saints (1st)
First qualifying round		(Gibraltar) Lincoln Red Imps (1st)			
Preliminary round		(Iceland) Breiðablik (1st)	(Montenegro) Budućnost Podgorica (1st)	(Andorra) Atlètic Club d'Escaldes (1st)	(San Marino) Tre Penne (1st)

Notes

1. Belarus (BLR): Shakhtyor Soligorsk would have qualified as champions of the 2022 Belarusian Premier League but were found guilty of match-fixing by the Football Federation of Belarus and denied a UEFA licence. Runners-up Energetik-BGU Minsk were also found guilty of match-fixing and also denied a UEFA licence. As a result, the ABFF decided to award the Champions League spot to BATE Borisov, who finished 3rd in the league.
2. Liechtenstein (LIE): The seven teams affiliated with the Liechtenstein Football Association (LFV) all played in the Swiss football league system. The only competition organised by the LFV was the Liechtenstein Football Cup – the winners of which qualified for the UEFA Europa Conference League.
3. Russia (RUS): On 28 February 2022, Russian football clubs and national teams were suspended from FIFA and UEFA competitions due to the Russian invasion of Ukraine. The tables reflect Russia's ongoing suspension from UEFA competitions.

== Schedule ==
The schedule of the competition was as follows. All matches were played on Tuesdays and Wednesdays apart from the preliminary round final and the final.

Schedule for 2023–24 UEFA Champions League
Phase	Round	Draw date	First leg	Second leg
Qualifying	Preliminary round	13 June 2023	27 June 2023 (semi-finals)	30 June 2023 (final)
Qualifying	First qualifying round	20 June 2023	11–12 July 2023	18–19 July 2023
Qualifying	Second qualifying round	21 June 2023	25–26 July 2023	1–2 August 2023
Qualifying	Third qualifying round	24 July 2023	8–9 & 15 August 2023	15 & 19 August 2023
Play-offs	Play-off round	7 August 2023	22–23 August 2023	29–30 August 2023
Group stage	Matchday 1	31 August 2023	19–20 September 2023	
Group stage	Matchday 2	31 August 2023	3–4 October 2023	
Group stage	Matchday 3	31 August 2023	24–25 October 2023	
Group stage	Matchday 4	31 August 2023	7–8 November 2023	
Group stage	Matchday 5	31 August 2023	28–29 November 2023	
Group stage	Matchday 6	31 August 2023	12–13 December 2023	
Knockout phase	Round of 16	18 December 2023	13–14 & 20–21 February 2024	5–6 & 12–13 March 2024
Knockout phase	Quarter-finals	15 March 2024	9–10 April 2024	16–17 April 2024
Knockout phase	Semi-finals	15 March 2024	30 April – 1 May 2024	7–8 May 2024
Knockout phase	Final	15 March 2024	1 June 2024 at Wembley Stadium, London	

== Qualifying rounds ==
=== Preliminary round ===
A total of four teams played in the preliminary round. Seeding of teams was based on their 2023 UEFA club coefficients, with two seeded teams and two unseeded teams in the semi-final round. The matches took place at Kópavogsvöllur in Kópavogur, Iceland. For administrative purposes, the home team in each draw were the first team drawn in each tie in the semi-final round. The same applied for the final draw, between the two winners of the semi-finals, whose identity was not known at the time of draw.The winner of the preliminary round final advanced to the first qualifying round. The losers of the semi-finals and final transferred to the Europa Conference League second qualifying round Champions Path.

Team 1	Score	Team 2
Semi-final round
Atlètic Club d'Escaldes (Andorra)	0–3	(Montenegro) Budućnost Podgorica
Tre Penne (San Marino)	1–7	(Iceland) Breiðablik
Final round
Budućnost Podgorica (Montenegro)	0–5	(Iceland) Breiðablik

=== First qualifying round ===
The draw for the first qualifying round was held on 20 June 2023. The first legs were played on 11 and 12 July, and the second legs were played on 18 and 19 July 2023.

The winners of the ties advanced to the Champions Path second qualifying round. 13 of the 15 losers were transferred to the Europa Conference League Champions Path second qualifying round and 2 losers received a bye and were transferred to the Europa Conference League Champions Path third qualifying round.

Team 1	Agg.	Team 2	1st leg	2nd leg
BK Häcken (Sweden)	5–1	(Wales) The New Saints	3–1	2–0
Ballkani (Kosovo)	2–4	(Bulgaria) Ludogorets Razgrad	2–0	0–4
Shamrock Rovers (Republic of Ireland)	1–3	(Iceland) Breiðablik	0–1	1–2
Žalgiris (Lithuania)	2–1	(North Macedonia) Struga	0–0	2–1
KÍ (Faroe Islands)	3–0	(Hungary) Ferencváros	0–0	3–0
Olimpija Ljubljana (Slovenia)	4–2	(Latvia) Valmiera	2–1	2–1
HJK (Finland)	3–2	(Northern Ireland) Larne	1–0	2–2 (a.e.t.)
Lincoln Red Imps (Gibraltar)	1–6 (Note: Losers drawn to receive a bye to the Europa Conference League third qualifying round.)	(Azerbaijan) Qarabağ	1–2	0–4
Raków Częstochowa (Poland)	4–0	(Estonia) Flora	1–0	3–0
Slovan Bratislava (Slovakia)	3–1	(Luxembourg) Swift Hesperange	1–1	2–0
Farul Constanța (Romania)	1–3	(Moldova) Sheriff Tiraspol	1–0	0–3 (a.e.t.)
Hamrun Spartans (Malta)	1–6	(Israel) Maccabi Haifa	0–4	1–2
Urartu (Armenia)	3–3 (3–4 p)	(Bosnia and Herzegovina) Zrinjski Mostar	0–1	3–2 (a.e.t.)
Partizani (Albania)	1–3	(Belarus) BATE Borisov	1–1	0–2
Astana (Kazakhstan)	3–2	(Georgia (country)) Dinamo Tbilisi	1–1	2–1

=== Second qualifying round ===
The draw for the second qualifying round was held on 21 June 2023. The first legs were played on 25 and 26 July, and the second legs were played on 1 and 2 August 2023.

The winners of the ties advanced to the third qualifying round of their respective path. The Champions Path losers were transferred to the Europa League Champions Path third qualifying round, while the League Path losers were transferred to the Europa League Main Path third qualifying round.

Team 1	Agg.	Team 2	1st leg	2nd leg
Champions Path
Žalgiris (Lithuania)	2–3	(Turkey) Galatasaray	2–2	0–1
Ludogorets Razgrad (Bulgaria)	2–3	(Slovenia) Olimpija Ljubljana	1–1	1–2
Raków Częstochowa (Poland)	4–3	(Azerbaijan) Qarabağ	3–2	1–1
KÍ (Faroe Islands)	3–3 (4–3 p)	(Sweden) BK Häcken	0–0	3–3 (a.e.t.)
HJK (Finland)	1–2	(Norway) Molde	1–0	0–2
Breiðablik (Iceland)	3–8	(Denmark) Copenhagen	0–2	3–6
Sheriff Tiraspol (Moldova)	2–4	(Israel) Maccabi Haifa	1–0	1–4 (a.e.t.)
Aris Limassol (Cyprus)	11–5	(Belarus) BATE Borisov	6–2	5–3
Zrinjski Mostar (Bosnia and Herzegovina)	2–3	(Slovakia) Slovan Bratislava	0–1	2–2
Dinamo Zagreb (Croatia)	6–0	(Kazakhstan) Astana	4–0	2–0
League Path
Dnipro-1 (Ukraine)	3–5	(Greece) Panathinaikos	1–3	2–2
Servette (Switzerland)	3–3 (4–1 p)	(Belgium) Genk	1–1	2–2 (a.e.t.)

=== Third qualifying round ===
The draw for the third qualifying round was held on 24 July 2023. The first legs were played on 8, 9 and 15 August, and the second legs were played on 15 and 19 August 2023.

The winners of the ties advanced to the play-off round of their respective path. The Champions Path losers were transferred to the Europa League play-off round, while the League Path losers were transferred to the Europa League group stage.

Team 1	Agg.	Team 2	1st leg	2nd leg
Champions Path
Raków Częstochowa (Poland)	3–1	(Cyprus) Aris Limassol	2–1	1–0
Slovan Bratislava (Slovakia)	2–5	(Israel) Maccabi Haifa	1–2	1–3
Dinamo Zagreb (Croatia)	3–4 (Note: The first leg of the AEK Athens–Dinamo Zagreb tie, originally scheduled to be played on 8 August 2023, was postponed following supporter riots in which one person died. The match was rescheduled for 19 August 2023 and became the second leg of the tie, thus reversing the order of the legs.)	(Greece) AEK Athens	1–2	2–2
Olimpija Ljubljana (Slovenia)	0–4	(Turkey) Galatasaray	0–3	0–1
Copenhagen (Denmark)	3–3 (4–2 p)	(Czech Republic) Sparta Prague	0–0	3–3 (a.e.t.)
KÍ (Faroe Islands)	2–3	(Norway) Molde	2–1	0–2 (a.e.t.)
League Path
Braga (Portugal)	7–1	(Serbia) TSC	3–0	4–1
Rangers (Scotland)	3–2	(Switzerland) Servette	2–1	1–1
Panathinaikos (Greece)	2–2 (5–3 p)	(France) Marseille	1–0	1–2 (a.e.t.)
PSV Eindhoven (Netherlands)	7–2	(Austria) Sturm Graz	4–1	3–1

== Play-off round ==
The draw for the play-off round was held on 7 August 2023. The first legs were played on 22 and 23 August, and the second legs were played on 29 and 30 August 2023.

The winners of the ties advanced to the group stage. The losers were transferred to the Europa League group stage.

Team 1	Agg.	Team 2	1st leg	2nd leg
Champions Path
Maccabi Haifa (Israel)	0–3	(Switzerland) Young Boys	0–0	0–3
Antwerp (Belgium)	3–1	(Greece) AEK Athens	1–0	2–1
Raków Częstochowa (Poland)	1–2	(Denmark) Copenhagen	0–1	1–1
Molde (Norway)	3–5	(Turkey) Galatasaray	2–3	1–2
League Path
Rangers (Scotland)	3–7	(Netherlands) PSV Eindhoven	2–2	1–5
Braga (Portugal)	3–1	(Greece) Panathinaikos	2–1	1–0

== Group stage ==
Location of teams of the 2023–24 UEFA Champions League group stage
Brown: Group A; Red: Group B; Orange: Group C; Yellow: Group D;
Green: Group E; Blue: Group F; Purple: Group G; Pink: Group H.
Location of Benelux and nearby teams of the 2023–24 UEFA Champions League group stage.
Red: Group B;
Green: Group E;
Blue: Group F;
Pink: Group H.

The group stage draw for the 2023–24 UEFA Champions League took place at the Grimaldi Forum, Monaco, on 31 August at 18:00 CEST. The 32 teams were drawn into eight groups of four. For the draw, the teams were seeded into four pots, each of eight teams, based on the following principles:

- Pot 1 contained the Champions League and Europa League title holders, and the champions of the top six associations based on their 2021–22 UEFA association coefficients. Because Manchester City (the champions of the 2022–23 Premier League) won the 2022–23 UEFA Champions League, the champions of Association 7 (Netherlands) Feyenoord entered into Pot 1.
- Pots 2, 3 and 4 contained the remaining qualified teams, with their pot being determined by UEFA club coefficient (CC).

Teams from the same association could not be drawn into the same group.

Antwerp and Union Berlin made their debut appearances in the group stage.

A total of 15 national associations were represented in the group stage.

=== Group A ===
Pos	Team	Pld	W	D	L	GF	GA	GD	Pts	Qualification	BAY	CPH	GAL	MUN
1	(Germany) Bayern Munich	6	5	1	0	12	6	+6	16	Advance to knockout phase	—	0–0	2–1	4–3
2	(Denmark) Copenhagen	6	2	2	2	8	8	0	8	Advance to knockout phase	1–2	—	1–0	4–3
3	(Turkey) Galatasaray	6	1	2	3	10	13	−3	5	Transfer to Europa League	1–3	2–2	—	3–3
4	(England) Manchester United	6	1	1	4	12	15	−3	4		0–1	1–0	2–3	—

Source: UEFA

=== Group B ===
Pos	Team	Pld	W	D	L	GF	GA	GD	Pts	Qualification	ARS	PSV	LEN	SEV
1	(England) Arsenal	6	4	1	1	16	4	+12	13	Advance to knockout phase	—	4–0	6–0	2–0
2	(Netherlands) PSV Eindhoven	6	2	3	1	8	10	−2	9	Advance to knockout phase	1–1	—	1–0	2–2
3	(France) Lens	6	2	2	2	6	11	−5	8	Transfer to Europa League	2–1	1–1	—	2–1
4	(Spain) Sevilla	6	0	2	4	7	12	−5	2		1–2	2–3	1–1	—

Source: UEFA

=== Group C ===
Pos	Team	Pld	W	D	L	GF	GA	GD	Pts	Qualification	RMA	NAP	BRA	UNB
1	(Spain) Real Madrid	6	6	0	0	16	7	+9	18	Advance to knockout phase	—	4–2	3–0	1–0
2	(Italy) Napoli	6	3	1	2	10	9	+1	10	Advance to knockout phase	2–3	—	2–0	1–1
3	(Portugal) Braga	6	1	1	4	6	12	−6	4	Transfer to Europa League	1–2	1–2	—	1–1
4	(Germany) Union Berlin	6	0	2	4	6	10	−4	2		2–3	0–1	2–3	—

Source: UEFA

=== Group D ===
Pos	Team	Pld	W	D	L	GF	GA	GD	Pts	Qualification	RSO	INT	BEN	SAL
1	(Spain) Real Sociedad	6	3	3	0	7	2	+5	12 (Note: Tied on head-to-head points, goal difference, and goals scored. Goal difference in all matches: Real Sociedad +5, Inter Milan +3.)	Advance to knockout phase	—	1–1	3–1	0–0
2	(Italy) Inter Milan	6	3	3	0	8	5	+3	12	Advance to knockout phase	0–0	—	1–0	2–1
3	(Portugal) Benfica	6	1	1	4	7	11	−4	4 (Note: Tied on head-to-head points, goal difference, goals scored, and goal difference in all matches. Goals scored in all matches: Benfica 7, Red Bull Salzburg 4.)	Transfer to Europa League	0–1	3–3	—	0–2
4	(Austria) Red Bull Salzburg	6	1	1	4	4	8	−4	4		0–2	0–1	1–3	—

Source: UEFA

=== Group E ===
Pos	Team	Pld	W	D	L	GF	GA	GD	Pts	Qualification	ATM	LAZ	FEY	CEL
1	(Spain) Atlético Madrid	6	4	2	0	17	6	+11	14	Advance to knockout phase	—	2–0	3–2	6–0
2	(Italy) Lazio	6	3	1	2	7	7	0	10	Advance to knockout phase	1–1	—	1–0	2–0
3	(Netherlands) Feyenoord	6	2	0	4	9	10	−1	6	Transfer to Europa League	1–3	3–1	—	2–0
4	(Scotland) Celtic	6	1	1	4	5	15	−10	4		2–2	1–2	2–1	—

Source: UEFA

=== Group F ===
Pos	Team	Pld	W	D	L	GF	GA	GD	Pts	Qualification	DOR	PAR	MIL	NEW
1	(Germany) Borussia Dortmund	6	3	2	1	7	4	+3	11	Advance to knockout phase	—	1–1	0–0	2–0
2	(France) Paris Saint-Germain	6	2	2	2	9	8	+1	8 (Note: Tied on head-to-head points. Head-to-head goal difference: Paris Saint-Germain +2, Milan −2.)	Advance to knockout phase	2–0	—	3–0	1–1
3	(Italy) Milan	6	2	2	2	5	8	−3	8	Transfer to Europa League	1–3	2–1	—	0–0
4	(England) Newcastle United	6	1	2	3	6	7	−1	5		0–1	4–1	1–2	—

Source: UEFA

=== Group G ===
Pos	Team	Pld	W	D	L	GF	GA	GD	Pts	Qualification	MCI	RBL	YB	RSB
1	(England) Manchester City	6	6	0	0	18	7	+11	18	Advance to knockout phase	—	3–2	3–0	3–1
2	(Germany) RB Leipzig	6	4	0	2	13	10	+3	12	Advance to knockout phase	1–3	—	2–1	3–1
3	(Switzerland) Young Boys	6	1	1	4	7	13	−6	4	Transfer to Europa League	1–3	1–3	—	2–0
4	(Serbia) Red Star Belgrade	6	0	1	5	7	15	−8	1		2–3	1–2	2–2	—

Source: UEFA

=== Group H ===
Pos	Team	Pld	W	D	L	GF	GA	GD	Pts	Qualification	BAR	POR	SHK	ANT
1	(Spain) Barcelona	6	4	0	2	12	6	+6	12 (Note: Head-to-head points: Barcelona 6, Porto 0.)	Advance to knockout phase	—	2–1	2–1	5–0
2	(Portugal) Porto	6	4	0	2	15	8	+7	12	Advance to knockout phase	0–1	—	5–3	2–0
3	(Ukraine) Shakhtar Donetsk	6	3	0	3	10	12	−2	9	Transfer to Europa League	1–0	1–3	—	1–0
4	(Belgium) Antwerp	6	1	0	5	6	17	−11	3		3–2	1–4	2–3	—

Source: UEFA

== Knockout phase ==
In the knockout phase, teams played against each other over two legs on a home-and-away basis, except for the one-match final. The mechanism of the draws for each round was as follows:

- In the draw for the round of 16, the eight group winners were seeded, and the eight group runners-up were unseeded. The seeded teams were drawn against the unseeded teams, with the seeded teams hosting the second leg. Teams from the same group or the same association could not be drawn against each other.
- In the draws for the quarter-finals and semi-finals, there were no seedings, and teams from the same group or the same association could be drawn against each other. As the draws for the quarter-finals and semi-finals were held together before the quarter-finals were played, the identity of the quarter-final winners was not known at the time of the semi-final draw. A draw was also held to determine which semi-final winner was designated as the "home" team for the final (for administrative purposes as it was played at a neutral venue).

=== Bracket ===
Round of 16
(Italy) Inter Milan	1	1	2 (2)
(Spain) Atlético Madrid (p)	0	2	2 (3)
(Netherlands) PSV Eindhoven	1	0	1
(Germany) Borussia Dortmund	1	2	3
(France) Paris Saint-Germain	2	2	4
(Spain) Real Sociedad	0	1	1
(Italy) Napoli	1	1	2
(Spain) Barcelona	1	3	4
(Portugal) Porto	1	0	1 (2)
(England) Arsenal (p)	0	1	1 (4)
(Italy) Lazio	1	0	1
(Germany) Bayern Munich	0	3	3
(Germany) RB Leipzig	0	1	1
(Spain) Real Madrid	1	1	2
(Denmark) Copenhagen	1	1	2
(England) Manchester City	3	3	6

Quarter-finals
(Spain) Atlético Madrid	2	2	4
(Germany) Borussia Dortmund	1	4	5
(France) Paris Saint-Germain	2	4	6
(Spain) Barcelona	3	1	4
(England) Arsenal	2	0	2
(Germany) Bayern Munich	2	1	3
(Spain) Real Madrid (p)	3	1	4 (4)
(England) Manchester City	3	1	4 (3)

Semi-finals
(Germany) Borussia Dortmund	1	1	2
(France) Paris Saint-Germain	0	0	0
(Germany) Bayern Munich	2	1	3
(Spain) Real Madrid	2	2	4

Final
1 June – London
(Germany) Borussia Dortmund	0
(Spain) Real Madrid	2

=== Round of 16 ===
The draw for the round of 16 was held on 18 December 2023, 12:00 CET. The first legs were played on 13, 14, 20 and 21 February, and the second legs were played on 5, 6, 12 and 13 March 2024.

Team 1	Agg.	Team 2	1st leg	2nd leg
Porto (Portugal)	1–1 (2–4 p)	(England) Arsenal	1–0	0–1 (a.e.t.)
Napoli (Italy)	2–4	(Spain) Barcelona	1–1	1–3
Paris Saint-Germain (France)	4–1	(Spain) Real Sociedad	2–0	2–1
Inter Milan (Italy)	2–2 (2–3 p)	(Spain) Atlético Madrid	1–0	1–2 (a.e.t.)
PSV Eindhoven (Netherlands)	1–3	(Germany) Borussia Dortmund	1–1	0–2
Lazio (Italy)	1–3	(Germany) Bayern Munich	1–0	0–3
Copenhagen (Denmark)	2–6	(England) Manchester City	1–3	1–3
RB Leipzig (Germany)	1–2	(Spain) Real Madrid	0–1	1–1

=== Quarter-finals ===
The draw for the quarter-finals was held on 15 March 2024, 12:00 CET. The first legs were played on 9 and 10 April, and the second legs were played on 16 and 17 April 2024.

Team 1	Agg.	Team 2	1st leg	2nd leg
Arsenal (England)	2–3	(Germany) Bayern Munich	2–2	0–1
Atlético Madrid (Spain)	4–5	(Germany) Borussia Dortmund	2–1	2–4
Real Madrid (Spain)	4–4 (4–3 p)	(England) Manchester City	3–3	1–1 (a.e.t.)
Paris Saint-Germain (France)	6–4	(Spain) Barcelona	2–3	4–1

=== Semi-finals ===
The draw for the semi-finals was held on 15 March 2024, 12:00 CET, after the quarter-final draw. The first legs were played on 30 April and 1 May, and the second legs were played on 7 and 8 May 2024.

Team 1	Agg.	Team 2	1st leg	2nd leg
Borussia Dortmund (Germany)	2–0	(France) Paris Saint-Germain	1–0	1–0
Bayern Munich (Germany)	3–4	(Spain) Real Madrid	2–2	1–2

=== Final ===
The final was played on 1 June 2024 at Wembley Stadium in London. A draw was held on 15 March 2024, after the quarter-final and semi-final draws, to determine the "home" team for administrative purposes.

1 June 2024
20:00 UTC+1

Borussia Dortmund (Germany)	0–2	(Spain) Real Madrid
	Report	Carvajal 74'; Vinícius 83'

Wembley Stadium, London
Attendance: 86,212
Referee: Slavko Vinčić (Slovenia)

== Statistics ==
Statistics exclude qualifying rounds and play-off round.

=== Top goalscorers ===
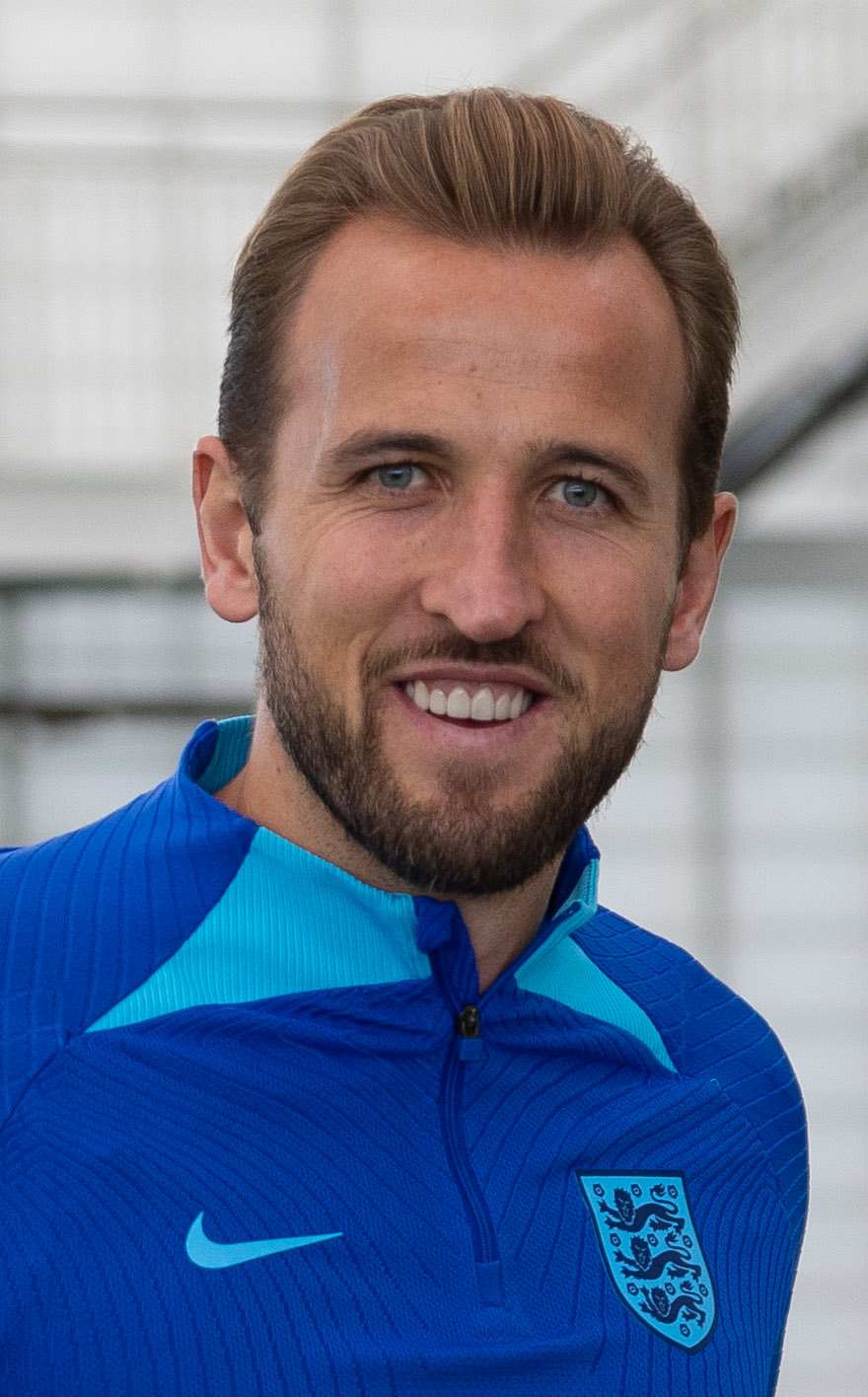
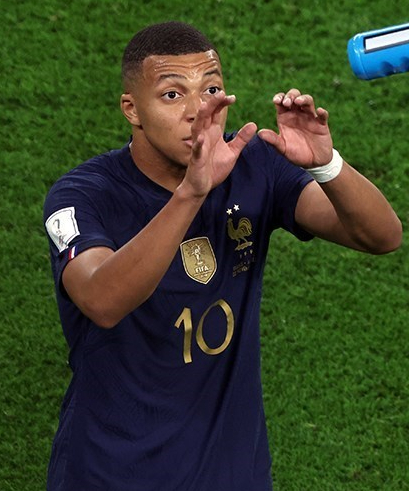
Bayern Munich's Harry Kane (left) and Paris Saint-Germain's Kylian Mbappé (right) were the tournament's top scorers with 8 goals each.

Rank	Player	Team	Goals	Minutes played
1	(England) Harry Kane	(Germany) Bayern Munich	8	1064
1	(France) Kylian Mbappé	(France) Paris Saint-Germain	8	1080
3	(Norway) Erling Haaland	(England) Manchester City	6	778
3	(France) Antoine Griezmann	(Spain) Atlético Madrid	6	821
3	(Brazil) Vinícius Júnior	(Spain) Real Madrid	6	901
6	(Spain) Joselu	(Spain) Real Madrid	5	273
6	(Argentina) Julián Álvarez	(England) Manchester City	5	279
6	(Denmark) Rasmus Højlund	(England) Manchester United	5	489
6	(Brazil) Galeno	(Portugal) Porto	5	651
6	(Spain) Álvaro Morata	(Spain) Atlético Madrid	5	667
6	(England) Phil Foden	(England) Manchester City	5	684
6	(Brazil) Rodrygo	(Spain) Real Madrid	5	1021

=== Team of the Season ===
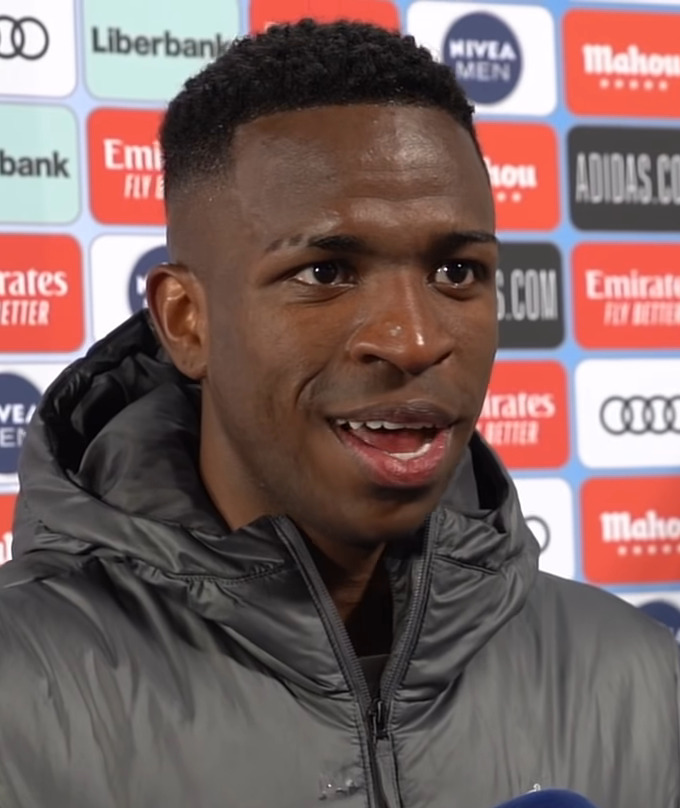
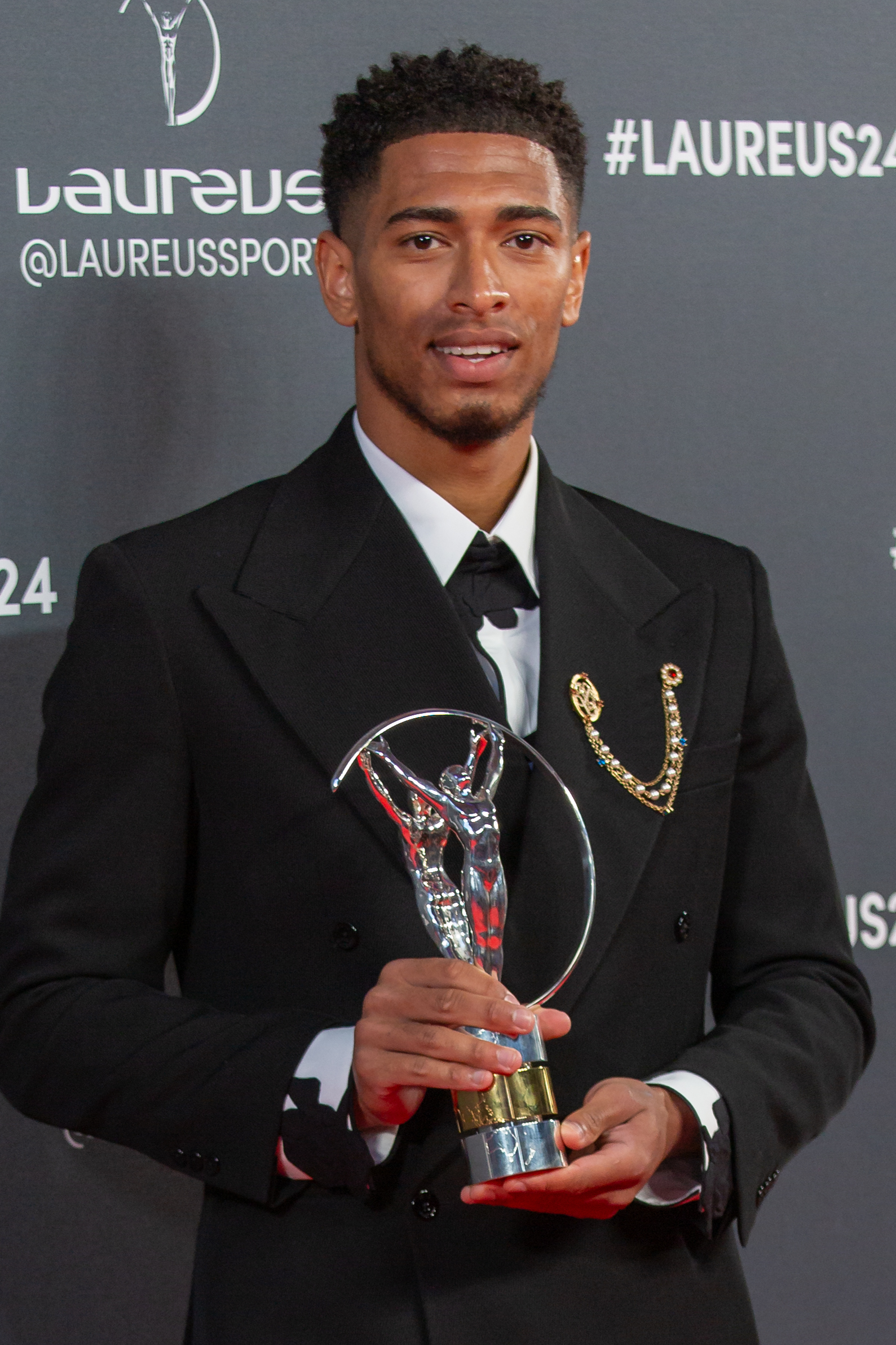
Real Madrid forward Vinícius Júnior (left) was named the Champions League Player of the Season, while his teammate midfielder Jude Bellingham (right) was named the Young Player of the Season.

The UEFA technical study group selected the following players as the team of the tournament.

Pos.	Player	Team
GK	(Switzerland) Gregor Kobel	(Germany) Borussia Dortmund
DF	(Spain) Dani Carvajal	(Spain) Real Madrid
DF	(Germany) Antonio Rüdiger	(Spain) Real Madrid
DF	(Germany) Mats Hummels	(Germany) Borussia Dortmund
DF	(Netherlands) Ian Maatsen	(Germany) Borussia Dortmund
MF	(Austria) Marcel Sabitzer	(Germany) Borussia Dortmund
MF	(Portugal) Vitinha	(France) Paris Saint-Germain
MF	(England) Jude Bellingham	(Spain) Real Madrid
FW	(England) Phil Foden	(England) Manchester City
FW	(England) Harry Kane	(Germany) Bayern Munich
FW	(Brazil) Vinícius Júnior	(Spain) Real Madrid

=== Player of the Season ===
- (Brazil) Vinícius Júnior ( (Spain) Real Madrid)

=== Young Player of the Season ===
- (England) Jude Bellingham ( (Spain) Real Madrid)

== See also ==
- 2023–24 UEFA Europa League
- 2023–24 UEFA Europa Conference League
- 2024 UEFA Super Cup
- 2023–24 UEFA Women's Champions League
- 2023–24 UEFA Youth League
