= 2023–24 UEFA Champions League qualifying =

European football tournament

2023–24 UEFA Champions League qualifying was the preliminary phase of the 2023–24 UEFA Champions League, prior to the competition proper. Qualification consisted of the qualifying phase (preliminary and first to third rounds) and the play-off round. It began on 27 June and ended on 30 August 2023.

A total of 52 teams competed in the qualifying system of the 2023–24 UEFA Champions League, with 42 teams in Champions Path and 10 teams in League Path. The six winners in the play-off round (four from Champions Path, two from League Path) advanced to the group stage, to join the 26 teams that entered in the group stage.

Times are CEST (UTC+2), as listed by UEFA (local times, if different, are in parentheses).

== Teams ==
=== Champions Path ===
The Champions Path included all league champions which did not qualify directly for the group stage, and consisted of the following rounds:

- Preliminary round (4 teams playing one-legged semi-finals and final): 4 teams which entered in this round.
- First qualifying round (30 teams): 29 teams which entered in this round, and 1 winner of the preliminary round.
- Second qualifying round (20 teams): 5 teams which entered in this round, and 15 winners of the first qualifying round.
- Third qualifying round (12 teams): 2 teams which entered in this round, and 10 winners of the second qualifying round.
- Play-off round (8 teams): 2 teams which entered in this round, and 6 winners of the third qualifying round.

All teams eliminated from the Champions Path entered either the Europa League or the Europa Conference League:

- The 3 losers of the preliminary round and 13 of the 15 losers of the first qualifying round entered the Europa Conference League Champions Path second qualifying round.
- 2 losers of the first qualifying round received a bye and entered the Europa Conference League Champions Path third qualifying round.
- The 10 losers of the second qualifying round entered the Europa League Champions Path third qualifying round
- The 6 losers of the third qualifying round entered the Europa League play-off round.
- The 4 losers of the play-off round entered the Europa League group stage.

Below were the participating teams of the Champions Path (with their 2023 UEFA club coefficients), grouped by their starting rounds.

Key to colours
Winners of play-off round advanced to group stage
Losers of play-off round entered Europa League group stage
Losers of third qualifying round entered Europa League play-off round
Losers of second qualifying round entered Europa League third qualifying round
Drawn losers of the first qualifying round entered Europa Conference League third qualifying round
Losers of the preliminary round and first qualifying round entered Europa Conference League second qualifying round

Play-off round
Team	Coeff.
(Switzerland) Young Boys	34.500
(Belgium) Antwerp	17.000

Third qualifying round
Team	Coeff.
(Czech Republic) Sparta Prague	14.000
(Greece) AEK Athens	11.000

Second qualifying round
Team	Coeff.
(Croatia) Dinamo Zagreb	55.000
(Denmark) Copenhagen	40.500
(Turkey) Galatasaray	31.500
(Norway) Molde	24.000
(Cyprus) Aris Limassol	4.895

First qualifying round
Team	Coeff.
(Hungary) Ferencváros	27.000
(Azerbaijan) Qarabağ	25.000
(Slovakia) Slovan Bratislava	24.500
(Bulgaria) Ludogorets Razgrad	21.000
(Moldova) Sheriff Tiraspol	19.500
(Belarus) BATE Borisov	15.000
(Kazakhstan) Astana	14.000
(Israel) Maccabi Haifa	13.000
(Lithuania) Žalgiris	11.000
(Finland) HJK	11.000
(Estonia) Flora	10.500
(Republic of Ireland) Shamrock Rovers	9.000
(Wales) The New Saints	9.000
(Slovenia) Olimpija Ljubljana	9.000
(Bosnia and Herzegovina) Zrinjski Mostar	8.500
(Gibraltar) Lincoln Red Imps	8.500
(Faroe Islands) KÍ	8.000
(Georgia (country)) Dinamo Tbilisi	7.500
(Poland) Raków Częstochowa	5.000
(Albania) Partizani	5.000
(Sweden) BK Häcken	4.750
(Romania) Farul Constanța	4.100
(Latvia) Valmiera	3.500
(Kosovo) Ballkani	3.000
(Northern Ireland) Larne	3.000
(Armenia) Urartu	3.000
(Malta) Hamrun Spartans	2.500
(Luxembourg) Swift Hesperange	1.800
(North Macedonia) Struga	1.100

Preliminary round
Team	Coeff.
(Montenegro) Budućnost Podgorica	7.500
(Iceland) Breiðablik	6.000
(San Marino) Tre Penne	4.000
(Andorra) Atlètic Club d'Escaldes	1.033

=== League Path ===
The League Path included all league non-champions which did not qualify directly for the group stage, and consisted of the following rounds:

- Second qualifying round (4 teams): 4 teams which entered in this round.
- Third qualifying round (8 teams): 6 teams which entered in this round, and 2 winners of the second qualifying round.
- Play-off round (4 teams): 4 winners of the third qualifying round.

All teams eliminated from the League Path entered the Europa League:

- The 2 losers of the second qualifying round entered the Main Path third qualifying round.
- The 4 losers of the third qualifying round and the 2 losers of the play-off round entered the group stage.

Below were the participating teams of the League Path (with their 2023 UEFA club coefficients), grouped by their starting rounds.

Key to colours
Winners of play-off round advanced to group stage
Losers of play-off round entered Europa League group stage
Losers of third qualifying round entered Europa League group stage
Losers of second qualifying round entered Europa League third qualifying round

Third qualifying round
Team	Coeff.
(Scotland) Rangers	54.000
(Portugal) Braga	44.000
(Netherlands) PSV Eindhoven	43.000
(France) Marseille	33.000
(Austria) Sturm Graz	12.500
(Serbia) TSC	6.475

Second qualifying round
Team	Coeff.
(Belgium) Genk	18.000
(Ukraine) Dnipro-1	8.000
(Switzerland) Servette	6.335
(Greece) Panathinaikos	5.045

== Format ==
Each tie, apart from the preliminary round, was played over two legs, with each team playing one leg at home. The team that scored more goals on aggregate over the two legs advanced to the next round. If the aggregate score was level at the end of normal time of the second leg, extra time was played, and if the same number of goals were scored by both teams during extra time, the tie was decided by a penalty shoot-out.

In the preliminary round, the semi-finals and final were played as a single match hosted by one of the participating teams. If the score was level at the end of normal time, extra time was played, and if the same number of goals were scored by both teams during extra time, the tie was decided by a penalty shoot-out.

The video assistant referee (VAR) was used in the third qualifying round and the play-off round.

In the draws for each round, teams were seeded based on their UEFA club coefficients at the beginning of the season, with the teams divided into seeded and unseeded pots containing the same number of teams. A seeded team was drawn against an unseeded team, with the order of legs (or the administrative "home" team in the preliminary round matches) in each tie decided by draw. As the identity of the winners of the previous round were not known at the time of the draws, the seeding was carried out under the assumption that the team with the higher coefficient of an undecided tie advanced to the subsequent round, which meant if the team with the lower coefficient was to advance, it would simply take the seeding of its opponent. Prior to the draws, UEFA could form "groups" in accordance with the principles set by the Club Competitions Committee purely for the convenience of the draw and not to resemble any real groupings in the sense of the competition. Teams from associations with political conflicts as decided by UEFA could not be drawn into the same tie. After the draws, the order of legs of a tie could be reversed by UEFA due to scheduling or venue conflicts.

== Schedule ==
The schedule of the qualifying phase and play-off round of the competition was as follows. All matches were played on Tuesdays and Wednesdays apart from the preliminary round final.

Schedule for 2023–24 UEFA Champions League qualifying phase and play-off round
Round	Draw date	First leg	Second leg
Preliminary round	13 June 2023	27 June 2023 (semi-finals)	30 June 2023 (final)
First qualifying round	20 June 2023	11–12 July 2023	18–19 July 2023
Second qualifying round	21 June 2023	25–26 July 2023	1–2 August 2023
Third qualifying round	24 July 2023	8–9 August 2023	15 August 2023
Play-off round	7 August 2023	22–23 August 2023	29–30 August 2023

== Preliminary round ==
The preliminary round consisted of two semi-finals on 27 June 2023 and a final on 30 June 2023. The draw for the preliminary round was held on 13 June 2023.

=== Seeding ===
A total of four teams played in the preliminary round. Seeding of teams was based on their 2023 UEFA club coefficients, with two seeded teams and two unseeded teams in the semi-final round. The matches took place at Kópavogsvöllur in Kópavogur, Iceland. For administrative purposes, the home team in each draw were the first team drawn in each tie in the semi-final round. The same applied for the final draw, between the two winners of the semi-finals, whose identity was not known at the time of draw.

Seeded	Unseeded
(Montenegro) Budućnost Podgorica; (Iceland) Breiðablik	(San Marino) Tre Penne; (Andorra) Atlètic Club d'Escaldes

=== Bracket ===
Semi-final round
27 June – Kópavogur
(Andorra) Atlètic Club d'Escaldes	0
(Montenegro) Budućnost Podgorica	3
27 June – Kópavogur
(San Marino) Tre Penne	1
(Iceland) Breiðablik	7

Final round
30 June – Kópavogur
(Montenegro) Budućnost Podgorica	0
(Iceland) Breiðablik	5

=== Summary ===
The preliminary round matches consisted of two semi-finals on 27 June 2023 and the final on 30 June 2023.

The winner of the preliminary round final advanced to the first qualifying round. The losers of the semi-finals and final transferred to the Europa Conference League second qualifying round Champions Path.

Team 1	Score	Team 2
Semi-final round
Atlètic Club d'Escaldes (Andorra)	0–3	(Montenegro) Budućnost Podgorica
Tre Penne (San Marino)	1–7	(Iceland) Breiðablik
Final round
Budućnost Podgorica (Montenegro)	0–5	(Iceland) Breiðablik

=== Semi-final round ===
27 June 2023
15:00 (13:00 UTC+0)

Atlètic Club d'Escaldes (Andorra)	0–3	(Montenegro) Budućnost Podgorica
	Report	Sekulić 14' (pen.), 60'; Sánchez 21' (o.g.)

Kópavogsvöllur, Kópavogur
Attendance: 103
Referee: Marcel Birsan (Romania)

27 June 2023
21:00 (19:00 UTC+0)

Tre Penne (San Marino)	1–7	(Iceland) Breiðablik
Barretta 31'	Report	Gunnlaugsson 6', 89'; Hlynsson 25', 90+2'; Olsen 45+2'; S. Sigurðarson 67'; V. Einarsson 74'

Kópavogsvöllur, Kópavogur
Attendance: 621
Referee: Mads-Kristoffer Kristoffersen (Denmark)

=== Final round ===
30 June 2023
21:00 (19:00 UTC+0)

Budućnost Podgorica (Montenegro)	0–5	(Iceland) Breiðablik
	Report	V. Einarsson 5'; S. Sigurðarson 22'; Eyjólfsson 29'; Gunnlaugsson 33'; Svanþórsson 74'

Kópavogsvöllur, Kópavogur
Attendance: 845
Referee: Krzysztof Jakubik (Poland)

== First qualifying round ==
The draw for the first qualifying round was held on 20 June 2023.

=== Seeding ===
A total of 30 teams played in the first qualifying round: 29 teams which entered in this round, and 1 winner of the preliminary round. Seeding of teams was based on their 2023 UEFA club coefficients. For the winner of the preliminary round, whose identity was not known at the time of draw, the club coefficient of the highest-ranked remaining team was used. Prior to the draw, UEFA formed three groups of five seeded teams and five unseeded teams in accordance with the principles set by the Club Competitions Committee. The first team drawn in each tie was the home team of the first leg.

Group 1		Group 2		Group 3	
Seeded	Unseeded	Seeded	Unseeded	Seeded	Unseeded
(Hungary) Ferencváros; (Bulgaria) Ludogorets Razgrad; (Lithuania) Žalgiris; (Republic of Ireland) Shamrock Rovers; (Wales) The New Saints	(Faroe Islands) KÍ; (Iceland) Breiðablik; (Sweden) BK Häcken; (Kosovo) Ballkani; (North Macedonia) Struga	(Azerbaijan) Qarabağ; (Slovakia) Slovan Bratislava; (Finland) HJK; (Estonia) Flora; (Slovenia) Olimpija Ljubljana	(Gibraltar) Lincoln Red Imps; (Poland) Raków Częstochowa; (Latvia) Valmiera; (Northern Ireland) Larne; (Luxembourg) Swift Hesperange	(Moldova) Sheriff Tiraspol; (Belarus) BATE Borisov; (Kazakhstan) Astana; (Israel) Maccabi Haifa; (Bosnia and Herzegovina) Zrinjski Mostar	(Georgia (country)) Dinamo Tbilisi; (Albania) Partizani; (Romania) Farul Constanța; (Armenia) Urartu; (Malta) Hamrun Spartans

Notes

1. ^{†} Winner of the preliminary round, whose identity was not known at the time of draw. Teams in italics defeated a team with a higher coefficient, thus effectively taking the coefficient of their opponent in the draw.

=== Summary ===
The first legs were played on 11 and 12 July, and the second legs were played on 18 and 19 July 2023.

The winners of the ties advanced to the Champions Path second qualifying round. 13 of the 15 losers were transferred to the Europa Conference League Champions Path second qualifying round and 2 losers received a bye and were transferred to the Europa Conference League Champions Path third qualifying round.

Team 1	Agg.	Team 2	1st leg	2nd leg
BK Häcken (Sweden)	5–1	(Wales) The New Saints	3–1	2–0
Ballkani (Kosovo)	2–4	(Bulgaria) Ludogorets Razgrad	2–0	0–4
Shamrock Rovers (Republic of Ireland)	1–3	(Iceland) Breiðablik	0–1	1–2
Žalgiris (Lithuania)	2–1	(North Macedonia) Struga	0–0	2–1
KÍ (Faroe Islands)	3–0	(Hungary) Ferencváros	0–0	3–0
Olimpija Ljubljana (Slovenia)	4–2	(Latvia) Valmiera	2–1	2–1
HJK (Finland)	3–2	(Northern Ireland) Larne	1–0	2–2 (a.e.t.)
Lincoln Red Imps (Gibraltar)	1–6 (Note: Losers drawn to receive a bye to the Europa Conference League third qualifying round.)	(Azerbaijan) Qarabağ	1–2	0–4
Raków Częstochowa (Poland)	4–0	(Estonia) Flora	1–0	3–0
Slovan Bratislava (Slovakia)	3–1	(Luxembourg) Swift Hesperange	1–1	2–0
Farul Constanța (Romania)	1–3	(Moldova) Sheriff Tiraspol	1–0	0–3 (a.e.t.)
Hamrun Spartans (Malta)	1–6	(Israel) Maccabi Haifa	0–4	1–2
Urartu (Armenia)	3–3 (3–4 p)	(Bosnia and Herzegovina) Zrinjski Mostar	0–1	3–2 (a.e.t.)
Partizani (Albania)	1–3	(Belarus) BATE Borisov	1–1	0–2
Astana (Kazakhstan)	3–2	(Georgia (country)) Dinamo Tbilisi	1–1	2–1

=== Matches ===
12 July 2023
19:00

BK Häcken (Sweden)	3–1	(Wales) The New Saints
Sadiq 7'; Rygaard 13'; Hovland 37'	Report	McManus 32'

Bravida Arena, Gothenburg
Attendance: 4,516
Referee: Henrik Nalbandyan (Armenia)
18 July 2023
20:00 (19:00 UTC+1)

The New Saints (Wales)	0–2	(Sweden) BK Häcken
	Report	Sadiq 19'; Sonko 90+1'

Park Hall, Oswestry
Attendance: 1,003
Referee: Dario Bel (Croatia)

BK Häcken won 5–1 on aggregate.

11 July 2023
20:45

Ballkani (Kosovo)	2–0	(Bulgaria) Ludogorets Razgrad
Korenica 45+1'; Zyba 55'	Report

Fadil Vokrri Stadium, Pristina (Note: Ballkani played their home match at the Fadil Vokrri Stadium in Pristina, instead of their regular stadium, the Theranda City Stadium, in Suva Reka, which did not meet UEFA requirements.)
Attendance: 7,656
Referee: Gal Leibovitz (Israel)
19 July 2023
20:00 (21:00 UTC+3)

Ludogorets Razgrad (Bulgaria)	4–0	(Kosovo) Ballkani
Tekpetey 4', 45+1'; Tissera 49'; Caio Vidal 78'	Report

Huvepharma Arena, Razgrad
Attendance: 5,353
Referee: Luca Pairetto (Italy)

Ludogorets Razgrad won 4–2 on aggregate.

11 July 2023
21:00 (20:00 UTC+1)

Shamrock Rovers (Republic of Ireland)	0–1	(Iceland) Breiðablik
	Report	Muminovic 39'

Tallaght Stadium, Tallaght
Attendance: 7,216
Referee: Chrysovalantis Theouli (Cyprus)
18 July 2023
21:15 (19:15 UTC+0)

Breiðablik (Iceland)	2–1	(Republic of Ireland) Shamrock Rovers
Svanþórsson 16'; Gunnlaugsson 58'	Report	Burke 65' (pen.)

Kópavogsvöllur, Kópavogur
Attendance: 1,320
Referee: Adam Ladebäck (Sweden)

Breiðablik won 3–1 on aggregate.

11 July 2023
18:00 (19:00 UTC+3)

Žalgiris (Lithuania)	0–0	(North Macedonia) Struga
	Report

LFF Stadium, Vilnius
Attendance: 4,647
Referee: Elchin Masiyev (Azerbaijan)
18 July 2023
17:00

Struga (North Macedonia)	1–2	(Lithuania) Žalgiris
Ibraimi 76' (pen.)	Report	Kendysh 78'; Radić 84' (o.g.)

SRC Biljanini Izvori, Ohrid (Note: Struga played their home match at the SRC Biljanini Izvori in Ohrid, instead of their regular stadium, the Gradska Plaža Stadium, in Struga, which did not meet UEFA requirements.)
Attendance: 1,400
Referee: Darren England (England)

Žalgiris won 2–1 on aggregate.

11 July 2023
20:45 (19:45 UTC+1)

KÍ (Faroe Islands)	0–0	(Hungary) Ferencváros
	Report

Við Djúpumýrar, Klaksvík
Attendance: 1,010
Referee: Juri Frischer (Estonia)
19 July 2023
18:00

Ferencváros (Hungary)	0–3	(Faroe Islands) KÍ
	Report	Frederiksberg 8' (pen.), 32'; Kassi 45+1'

Ferencváros Stadion, Budapest
Attendance: 18,187
Referee: David Smajc (Slovenia)

KÍ won 3–0 on aggregate.

11 July 2023
20:00

Olimpija Ljubljana (Slovenia)	2–1	(Latvia) Valmiera
Nukić 42'; Rui Pedro 74'	Report	Diop 87'

Stožice Stadium, Ljubljana
Attendance: 4,355
Referee: Andrei Chivulete (Romania)
19 July 2023
17:00 (18:00 UTC+3)

Valmiera (Latvia)	1–2	(Slovenia) Olimpija Ljubljana
Mena 82'	Report	Rui Pedro 33'; Muhamedbegović 64'

Jānis Daliņš Stadium, Valmiera
Attendance: 1,250
Referee: Cesar Soto Grado (Spain)

Olimpija Ljubljana won 4–2 on aggregate.

12 July 2023
18:00 (19:00 UTC+3)

HJK (Finland)	1–0	(Northern Ireland) Larne
Radulović 3' (pen.)	Report

Bolt Arena, Helsinki
Attendance: 10,121
Referee: Goga Kikacheishvili (Georgia)
19 July 2023
20:30 (19:30 UTC+1)

Larne (Northern Ireland)	2–2 (a.e.t.)	(Finland) HJK
Bonis 65' (pen.); Thomson 87'	Report	Ollila 26'; Want 97' (o.g.)

Solitude, Belfast (Note: Larne played their home match at Solitude in Belfast, instead of their regular stadium, Inver Park, in Larne, which did not meet UEFA requirements.)
Attendance: 1,993
Referee: Aristotelis Diamantopoulos (Greece)

HJK won 3–2 on aggregate.

11 July 2023
17:30

Lincoln Red Imps (Gibraltar)	1–2	(Azerbaijan) Qarabağ
Gómez 25'	Report	Xhixha 58'; Benzia 90+4'

Victoria Stadium, Gibraltar
Attendance: 683
Referee: Vitālijs Spasjoņņikovs (Latvia)
19 July 2023
18:00 (20:00 UTC+4)

Qarabağ (Azerbaijan)	4–0	(Gibraltar) Lincoln Red Imps
Zoubir 7'; Mustafazadə 45+1'; Xhixha 49'; Janković 62'	Report

Baku Olympic Stadium, Baku
Attendance: 19,453
Referee: Eldorjan Hamiti (Albania)

Qarabağ won 6–1 on aggregate.

11 July 2023
20:00

Raków Częstochowa (Poland)	1–0	(Estonia) Flora
Kocherhin 54'	Report

Miejski Stadion Piłkarski "Raków", Częstochowa
Attendance: 5,242
Referee: Arda Kardeşler (Turkey)
18 July 2023
19:00 (20:00 UTC+3)

Flora (Estonia)	0–3	(Poland) Raków Częstochowa
	Report	Zwoliński 47', 59'; Papanikolaou 85'

Lilleküla Stadium, Tallinn
Attendance: 3,204
Referee: Marian Barbu (Romania)

Raków Częstochowa won 4–0 on aggregate.

12 July 2023
20:30

Slovan Bratislava (Slovakia)	1–1	(Luxembourg) Swift Hesperange
Weiss 25'	Report	Stolz 22' (pen.)

Tehelné pole, Bratislava
Attendance: 14,470
Referee: Viktor Kopiievskyi (Ukraine)
19 July 2023
20:00

Swift Hesperange (Luxembourg)	0–2	(Slovakia) Slovan Bratislava
	Report	Weiss 55' (pen.), 62' (pen.)

Stade de Luxembourg, Luxembourg City (Note: Swift Hesperange played their home match at the Stade de Luxembourg in Luxembourg City, instead of their regular stadium, Stade Alphonse Theis, in Hesperange, which did not meet UEFA requirements.)
Attendance: 3,054
Referee: Abdulkadir Bitigen (Turkey)

Slovan Bratislava won 3–1 on aggregate.

12 July 2023
19:30 (20:30 UTC+3)

Farul Constanța (Romania)	1–0	(Moldova) Sheriff Tiraspol
Kiki 56'	Report

Stadionul Viitorul, Ovidiu
Attendance: 4,028
Referee: Sander van der Eijk (Netherlands)
18 July 2023
19:00 (20:00 UTC+3)

Sheriff Tiraspol (Moldova)	3–0 (a.e.t.)	(Romania) Farul Constanța
Talal 45+1'; Ngom Mbekeli 99'; Ademo 105+1'	Report

Sheriff Stadium, Tiraspol
Attendance: 5,792
Referee: Miguel Nogueira (Portugal)

Sheriff Tiraspol won 3–1 on aggregate.

11 July 2023
20:00

Hamrun Spartans (Malta)	0–4	(Israel) Maccabi Haifa
	Report	Pierrot 41', 64'; David 45+3'; Khalaily 85'

Centenary Stadium, Ta' Qali (Note: Hamrun Spartans played their home match at the Centenary Stadium in Ta' Qali, instead of their regular stadium, Victor Tedesco Stadium, in Hamrun, which did not meet UEFA requirements.)
Attendance: 1,627
Referee: Donald Robertson (Scotland)
18 July 2023
19:00 (20:00 UTC+3)

Maccabi Haifa (Israel)	2–1	(Malta) Hamrun Spartans
Shuranov 69'; Pierrot 84'	Report	Mbong 32'

Sammy Ofer Stadium, Haifa
Attendance: 29,000
Referee: Igor Pajač (Croatia)

Maccabi Haifa won 6–1 on aggregate.

11 July 2023
17:00 (19:00 UTC+4)

Urartu (Armenia)	0–1	(Bosnia and Herzegovina) Zrinjski Mostar
	Report	Senić 89'

Urartu Stadium, Yerevan
Attendance: 3,900
Referee: Philip Farrugia (Malta)
18 July 2023
20:00

Zrinjski Mostar (Bosnia and Herzegovina)	2–3 (a.e.t.)	(Armenia) Urartu
Bilbija 27'; Kiš 94' (pen.)	Report	Grigoryan 74', 90+1' (pen.); Maksimenko 105+3'
Penalties
Kiš (penalty scored); Kožulj (penalty scored); Zlomislić (penalty missed); Senić (penalty scored); Barišić (penalty scored)	4–3	(penalty scored) Maksimenko; (penalty scored) Özbiliz; (penalty scored) Grigoryan; (penalty missed) Eduardo Teixeira; (penalty missed) Ghazaryan

Stadion pod Bijelim Brijegom, Mostar
Attendance: 5,000
Referee: Peter Kjaesgaard (Denmark)

3–3 on aggregate; Zrinjski Mostar won 4–3 on penalties.

11 July 2023
20:45

Partizani (Albania)	1–1	(Belarus) BATE Borisov
Cara 66'	Report	Antilevsky 58'

Arena Kombëtare, Tirana
Attendance: 5,000
Referee: Nathan Verboomen (Belgium)
18 July 2023
20:00

BATE Borisov (Belarus)	2–0	(Albania) Partizani
Malkevich 71'; Shestyuk 90+12'	Report

Mezőkövesdi Városi Stadion, Mezőkövesd, Hungary (Note: Due to the country's involvement in the Russian invasion of Ukraine, Belarusian teams were required to play their home matches at neutral venues and behind closed doors until further notice.)
Attendance: 0
Referee: Kevin Clancy (Scotland)

BATE Borisov won 3–1 on aggregate.

12 July 2023
16:00 (20:00 UTC+6)

Astana (Kazakhstan)	1–1	(Georgia (country)) Dinamo Tbilisi
Aymbetov 11'	Report	Sigua 57'

Astana Arena, Astana
Attendance: 27,328
Referee: Christian-Petru Ciochirca (Austria)
19 July 2023
18:00 (20:00 UTC+4)

Dinamo Tbilisi (Georgia (country))	1–2	(Kazakhstan) Astana
Camara 22'	Report	Beysebekov 50'; Darboe 51'

Boris Paichadze Dinamo Arena, Tbilisi
Attendance: 10,736
Referee: Stuart Attwell (England)

Astana won 3–2 on aggregate.

== Second qualifying round ==
The draw for the second qualifying round was held on 21 June 2023.

=== Seeding ===
A total of 24 teams played in the second qualifying round. They were divided into two paths:

- Champions Path (20 teams): 5 teams which entered in this round, and 15 winners of first qualifying round.
- League Path (4 teams): 4 teams which entered in this round.

Seeding of teams was based on their 2023 UEFA club coefficients. For the winners of first qualifying round, whose identity was not known at the time of draw, the club coefficient of the highest-ranked remaining team in each tie was used. Prior to the draw, UEFA formed three groups for the champions path draw in accordance with the principles set by the Club Competitions Committee: two groups that produce three ties each (Groups 1 and 2) and one with four ties (Group 3). The first team drawn in each tie was the home team of the first leg.

Champions Path
Group 1		Group 2		Group 3	
Seeded	Unseeded	Seeded	Unseeded	Seeded	Unseeded
(Turkey) Galatasaray; (Azerbaijan) Qarabağ; (Bulgaria) Ludogorets Razgrad	(Lithuania) Žalgiris; (Poland) Raków Częstochowa; (Slovenia) Olimpija Ljubljana	(Denmark) Copenhagen; (Faroe Islands) KÍ; (Norway) Molde	(Finland) HJK; (Iceland) Breiðablik; (Sweden) BK Häcken	(Croatia) Dinamo Zagreb; (Slovakia) Slovan Bratislava; (Moldova) Sheriff Tiraspol; (Belarus) BATE Borisov	(Kazakhstan) Astana; (Israel) Maccabi Haifa; (Bosnia and Herzegovina) Zrinjski Mostar; (Cyprus) Aris Limassol

Notes

1. ^{†} Winners of first qualifying round, whose identity was not known at the time of draw. Teams in italics defeated a team with a higher coefficient, thus effectively taking the coefficient of their opponent in the draw.

League Path
Seeded	Unseeded
(Belgium) Genk; (Ukraine) Dnipro-1	(Switzerland) Servette; (Greece) Panathinaikos

=== Summary ===
The first legs were played on 25 and 26 July, and the second legs were played on 1 and 2 August 2023.

The winners of the ties advanced to the third qualifying round of their respective path. The Champions Path losers were transferred to the Europa League Champions Path third qualifying round, while the League Path losers were transferred to the Europa League Main Path third qualifying round.

Team 1	Agg.	Team 2	1st leg	2nd leg
Champions Path
Žalgiris (Lithuania)	2–3	(Turkey) Galatasaray	2–2	0–1
Ludogorets Razgrad (Bulgaria)	2–3	(Slovenia) Olimpija Ljubljana	1–1	1–2
Raków Częstochowa (Poland)	4–3	(Azerbaijan) Qarabağ	3–2	1–1
KÍ (Faroe Islands)	3–3 (4–3 p)	(Sweden) BK Häcken	0–0	3–3 (a.e.t.)
HJK (Finland)	1–2	(Norway) Molde	1–0	0–2
Breiðablik (Iceland)	3–8	(Denmark) Copenhagen	0–2	3–6
Sheriff Tiraspol (Moldova)	2–4	(Israel) Maccabi Haifa	1–0	1–4 (a.e.t.)
Aris Limassol (Cyprus)	11–5	(Belarus) BATE Borisov	6–2	5–3
Zrinjski Mostar (Bosnia and Herzegovina)	2–3	(Slovakia) Slovan Bratislava	0–1	2–2
Dinamo Zagreb (Croatia)	6–0	(Kazakhstan) Astana	4–0	2–0
League Path
Dnipro-1 (Ukraine)	3–5	(Greece) Panathinaikos	1–3	2–2
Servette (Switzerland)	3–3 (4–1 p)	(Belgium) Genk	1–1	2–2 (a.e.t.)

=== Champions Path matches ===
25 July 2023
18:00 (19:00 UTC+3)

Žalgiris (Lithuania)	2–2	(Turkey) Galatasaray
Oyewusi 48'; Kazlauskas 90+2'	Report	Bardakcı 75'; Dervişoğlu 78'

LFF Stadium, Vilnius
Attendance: 4,864
Referee: Luis Godinho (Portugal)
2 August 2023
20:30 (21:30 UTC+3)

Galatasaray (Turkey)	1–0	(Lithuania) Žalgiris
Mertens 31'	Report

Rams Park, Istanbul
Attendance: 41,505
Referee: Willy Delajod (France)

Galatasaray won 3–2 on aggregate.

26 July 2023
20:45 (21:45 UTC+3)

Ludogorets Razgrad (Bulgaria)	1–1	(Slovenia) Olimpija Ljubljana
Yankov 44'	Report	Elšnik 14'

Huvepharma Arena, Razgrad
Attendance: 5,532
Referee: Rohit Saggi (Norway)
1 August 2023
20:00

Olimpija Ljubljana (Slovenia)	2–1	(Bulgaria) Ludogorets Razgrad
Elšnik 18', 90+2'	Report	Despodov 15'

Stožice Stadium, Ljubljana
Attendance: 9,265
Referee: Christian Dingert (Germany)

Olimpija Ljubljana won 3–2 on aggregate.

26 July 2023
20:15

Raków Częstochowa (Poland)	3–2	(Azerbaijan) Qarabağ
Cafarguliyev 55' (o.g.); Piasecki 71'; Kittel 90+1'	Report	Xhixha 73', 75'

Miejski Stadion Piłkarski "Raków", Częstochowa
Attendance: 5,451
Referee: Lukas Fähndrich (Switzerland)
2 August 2023
18:00 (20:00 UTC+4)

Qarabağ (Azerbaijan)	1–1	(Poland) Raków Częstochowa
Xhixha 60'	Report	Tudor 52'

Baku Olympic Stadium, Baku
Attendance: 31,257
Referee: Sven Jablonski (Germany)

Raków Częstochowa won 4–3 on aggregate.

26 July 2023
20:45 (19:45 UTC+1)

KÍ (Faroe Islands)	0–0	(Sweden) BK Häcken
	Report

Við Djúpumýrar, Klaksvík
Attendance: 1,224
Referee: Michal Ocenáš (Slovakia)
2 August 2023
19:00

BK Häcken (Sweden)	3–3 (a.e.t.)	(Faroe Islands) KÍ
Sana 24'; Layouni 48'; Sadiq 105+1'	Report	Frederiksberg 17', 53'; Abrahamsson 109' (o.g.)
Penalties
Hovland (penalty scored); Layouni (penalty scored); Sa. Gustafson (penalty scored); Rygaard (penalty missed); Sandberg (penalty missed)	3–4	(penalty scored) Frederiksberg; (penalty scored) J. Andreasen; (penalty scored) Da Silva; (penalty missed) Gussiås; (penalty scored) Forren

Bravida Arena, Gothenburg
Attendance: 4,396
Referee: Andrew Madley (England)

3–3 on aggregate; KÍ won 4–3 on penalties.

25 July 2023
18:00 (19:00 UTC+3)

HJK (Finland)	1–0	(Norway) Molde
Keskinen 25'	Report

Bolt Arena, Helsinki
Attendance: 8,154
Referee: Sven Jablonski (Germany)
2 August 2023
19:00

Molde (Norway)	2–0	(Finland) HJK
Öst 74' (o.g.); Brynhildsen 89'	Report

Aker Stadion, Molde
Attendance: 5,205
Referee: Igor Pajač (Croatia)

Molde won 2–1 on aggregate.

25 July 2023
21:15 (19:15 UTC+0)

Breiðablik (Iceland)	0–2	(Denmark) Copenhagen
	Report	Larsson 1'; Falk 32'

Kópavogsvöllur, Kópavogur
Attendance: 1,485
Referee: Gergő Bogár (Hungary)
2 August 2023
20:00

Copenhagen (Denmark)	6–3	(Iceland) Breiðablik
Gonçalves 33'; Achouri 35'; Larsson 37'; Óskarsson 45+1', 47', 56'	Report	Svanþórsson 9'; Steindórsson 51'; Gunnlaugsson 75'

Parken Stadium, Copenhagen
Attendance: 20,886
Referee: Fabio Maresca (Italy)

Copenhagen won 8–3 on aggregate.

26 July 2023
19:00 (20:00 UTC+3)

Sheriff Tiraspol (Moldova)	1–0	(Israel) Maccabi Haifa
Talal 28'	Report

Sheriff Stadium, Tiraspol
Attendance: 7,933
Referee: Sebastian Gishamer (Austria)
2 August 2023
19:00 (20:00 UTC+3)

Maccabi Haifa (Israel)	4–1 (a.e.t.)	(Moldova) Sheriff Tiraspol
Chery 33'; Jaber 85'; David 105+2'; Shuranov 107'	Report	Talal 20' (pen.)

Sammy Ofer Stadium, Haifa
Attendance: 29,000
Referee: Damian Sylwestrzak (Poland)

Maccabi Haifa won 4–2 on aggregate.

26 July 2023
19:00 (20:00 UTC+3)

Aris Limassol (Cyprus)	6–2	(Belarus) BATE Borisov
Gomis 17' (pen.), 60'; Bengtsson 32'; Bane 40' (o.g.); Montnor 83'; Stępiński 90+1' (pen.)	Report	Kontsevoy 48'; Khadarkevich 65'

Alphamega Stadium, Limassol
Attendance: 3,338
Referee: Yigal Frid (Israel)
1 August 2023
20:00

BATE Borisov (Belarus)	3–5	(Cyprus) Aris Limassol
Gromyko 25' (pen.); Martynaw 48'; Laptev 90+3' (pen.)	Report	Babicka 8'; Gomis 26'; Caju 35'; Bengtsson 56'; Stępiński 74'

Mezőkövesdi Városi Stadion, Mezőkövesd, Hungary
Attendance: 0
Referee: Morten Krogh (Denmark)

Aris Limassol won 11–5 on aggregate.

25 July 2023
21:00

Zrinjski Mostar (Bosnia and Herzegovina)	0–1	(Slovakia) Slovan Bratislava
	Report	Zuberu 53'

Stadion pod Bijelim Brijegom, Mostar
Attendance: 4,900
Referee: Bram Van Driessche (Belgium)
1 August 2023
20:30

Slovan Bratislava (Slovakia)	2–2	(Bosnia and Herzegovina) Zrinjski Mostar
Čavrić 5'; Zuberu 66'	Report	Barišić 75'; Ivančić 90+3'

Tehelné pole, Bratislava
Attendance: 20,498
Referee: Jérémie Pignard (France)

Slovan Bratislava won 3–2 on aggregate.

25 July 2023
20:00

Dinamo Zagreb (Croatia)	4–0	(Kazakhstan) Astana
Špikić 36'; Ivanušec 41', 43', 56'	Report

Stadion Maksimir, Zagreb
Attendance: 7,123
Referee: Guillermo Cuadra Fernández (Spain)
2 August 2023
16:00 (20:00 UTC+6)

Astana (Kazakhstan)	0–2	(Croatia) Dinamo Zagreb
	Report	Marochkin 24' (o.g.); Marin 89'

Astana Arena, Astana
Attendance: 26,978
Referee: Dennis Higler (Netherlands)

Dinamo Zagreb won 6–0 on aggregate.

=== League Path matches ===
25 July 2023
20:00

Dnipro-1 (Ukraine)	1–3	(Greece) Panathinaikos
Tanchyk 90'	Report	Šporar 10'; Đuričić 74'; Ioannidis 84' (pen.)

Košická futbalová aréna, Košice, Slovakia (Note: Due to the Russian invasion of Ukraine, Ukrainian teams were required to play their home matches at neutral venues until further notice.)
Attendance: 5,248
Referee: Daniele Chiffi (Italy)
1 August 2023
19:30 (20:30 UTC+3)

Panathinaikos (Greece)	2–2	(Ukraine) Dnipro-1
Šporar 15', 70'	Report	Dovbyk 24'; Sarapiy 54'

Leoforos Alexandras Stadium, Athens
Attendance: 14,098
Referee: Bastian Dankert (Germany)

Panathinaikos won 5–3 on aggregate.

25 July 2023
20:30

Servette (Switzerland)	1–1	(Belgium) Genk
Rouiller 78'	Report	Arokodare 21'

Stade de Genève, Geneva
Attendance: 18,026
Referee: István Vad (Hungary)
2 August 2023
19:00

Genk (Belgium)	2–2 (a.e.t.)	(Switzerland) Servette
Trésor 28' (pen.); Arokodare 51'	Report	Cognat 36'; Bedia 63'
Penalties
Hrošovský (penalty missed); Cuesta (penalty scored); Arokodare (penalty missed)	1–4	(penalty scored) Touati; (penalty scored) Guillemenot; (penalty scored) Severin; (penalty scored) Rodelin

Cegeka Arena, Genk
Attendance: 16,280
Referee: Novak Simović (Serbia)

3–3 on aggregate; Servette won 4–1 on penalties.

== Third qualifying round ==
The draw for the third qualifying round was held on 24 July 2023.

=== Seeding ===
A total of 20 teams played in the third qualifying round. They were divided into two paths:

- Champions Path (12 teams): 2 teams which entered in this round, and 10 winners of the second qualifying round (Champions Path).
- League Path (8 teams): 6 teams which entered in this round, and 2 winners of the second qualifying round (League Path).

Seeding of teams was based on their 2023 UEFA club coefficients. For the winners of the second qualifying round, whose identity was not known at the time of draw, the club coefficient of the highest-ranked remaining team in each tie was used. Prior to the draw, UEFA formed groups of seeded and unseeded teams in accordance with the principles set by the Club Competitions Committee. The first team drawn in each tie was the home team of the first leg.

Champions Path
Group 1		Group 2	
Seeded	Unseeded	Seeded	Unseeded
(Croatia) Dinamo Zagreb; (Poland) Raków Częstochowa; (Slovakia) Slovan Bratislava	(Israel) Maccabi Haifa; (Cyprus) Aris Limassol; (Greece) AEK Athens	(Denmark) Copenhagen; (Turkey) Galatasaray; (Norway) Molde	(Slovenia) Olimpija Ljubljana; (Czech Republic) Sparta Prague; (Faroe Islands) KÍ

League Path
Seeded	Unseeded
(Scotland) Rangers; (Portugal) Braga; (Netherlands) PSV Eindhoven; (France) Marseille	(Switzerland) Servette; (Austria) Sturm Graz; (Greece) Panathinaikos; (Serbia) TSC

Notes

1. ^{†} Winners of the second qualifying round, whose identity was not known at the time of draw. Teams in italics defeated a team with a higher coefficient, thus effectively taking the coefficient of their opponent in the draw.

=== Summary ===
The first legs were played on 8, 9 and 15 August, and the second legs were played on 15 and 19 August 2023.

The winners of the ties advanced to the play-off round of their respective path. The Champions Path losers were transferred to the Europa League play-off round, while the League Path losers were transferred to the Europa League group stage.

Team 1	Agg.	Team 2	1st leg	2nd leg
Champions Path
Raków Częstochowa (Poland)	3–1	(Cyprus) Aris Limassol	2–1	1–0
Slovan Bratislava (Slovakia)	2–5	(Israel) Maccabi Haifa	1–2	1–3
Dinamo Zagreb (Croatia)	3–4 (Note: The first leg of the AEK Athens–Dinamo Zagreb tie, originally scheduled to be played on 8 August 2023, was postponed following supporter riots in which one person died. The match was rescheduled for 19 August 2023 and became the second leg of the tie, thus reversing the order of the legs.)	(Greece) AEK Athens	1–2	2–2
Olimpija Ljubljana (Slovenia)	0–4	(Turkey) Galatasaray	0–3	0–1
Copenhagen (Denmark)	3–3 (4–2 p)	(Czech Republic) Sparta Prague	0–0	3–3 (a.e.t.)
KÍ (Faroe Islands)	2–3	(Norway) Molde	2–1	0–2 (a.e.t.)
League Path
Braga (Portugal)	7–1	(Serbia) TSC	3–0	4–1
Rangers (Scotland)	3–2	(Switzerland) Servette	2–1	1–1
Panathinaikos (Greece)	2–2 (5–3 p)	(France) Marseille	1–0	1–2 (a.e.t.)
PSV Eindhoven (Netherlands)	7–2	(Austria) Sturm Graz	4–1	3–1

=== Champions Path matches ===
8 August 2023
20:00

Raków Częstochowa (Poland)	2–1	(Cyprus) Aris Limassol
Kocherhin 7'; Piasecki 63' (pen.)	Report	Mayambela 89'

Miejski Stadion Piłkarski "Raków", Częstochowa
Attendance: 5,500
Referee: Duje Strukan (Croatia)
15 August 2023
19:00 (20:00 UTC+3)

Aris Limassol (Cyprus)	0–1	(Poland) Raków Częstochowa
	Report	Tudor 49'

Alphamega Stadium, Limassol
Attendance: 3,959
Referee: Matej Jug (Slovenia)

Raków Częstochowa won 3–1 on aggregate.

9 August 2023
20:30

Slovan Bratislava (Slovakia)	1–2	(Israel) Maccabi Haifa
Seck 12' (o.g.)	Report	Pierrot 5'; Saba 15'

Tehelné pole, Bratislava
Attendance: 21,375
Referee: Andris Treimanis (Latvia)
15 August 2023
19:00 (20:00 UTC+3)

Maccabi Haifa (Israel)	3–1	(Slovakia) Slovan Bratislava
Pierrot 29'; Saba 45+2'; David 90+3'	Report	Tolić 86'

Sammy Ofer Stadium, Haifa
Attendance: 29,000
Referee: Craig Pawson (England)

Maccabi Haifa won 5–2 on aggregate.

15 August 2023
20:00

Dinamo Zagreb (Croatia)	1–2	(Greece) AEK Athens
Bulat 39'	Report	Zuber 59'; Galanopoulos 90'

Stadion Maksimir, Zagreb
Attendance: 13,311
Referee: João Pinheiro (Portugal)
19 August 2023
20:45 (21:45 UTC+3)

AEK Athens (Greece)	2–2	(Croatia) Dinamo Zagreb
Araujo 90+2'; Vida 90+10'	Report	J. Šutalo 45+2'; Ljubičić 65'

Agia Sophia Stadium, Athens
Attendance: 30,100
Referee: Espen Eskås (Norway)

AEK Athens won 4–3 on aggregate.

8 August 2023
21:00

Olimpija Ljubljana (Slovenia)	0–3	(Turkey) Galatasaray
	Report	Aktürkoğlu 9'; Mertens 48'; Dervişoğlu 90+1'

Stožice Stadium, Ljubljana
Attendance: 13,712
Referee: Andreas Ekberg (Sweden)
15 August 2023
20:00 (21:00 UTC+3)

Galatasaray (Turkey)	1–0	(Slovenia) Olimpija Ljubljana
Icardi 24'	Report

Rams Park, Istanbul
Attendance: 38,383
Referee: Marco Guida (Italy)

Galatasaray won 4–0 on aggregate.

8 August 2023
20:00

Copenhagen (Denmark)	0–0	(Czech Republic) Sparta Prague
	Report

Parken Stadium, Copenhagen
Attendance: 27,170
Referee: Benoît Bastien (France)
15 August 2023
19:00

Sparta Prague (Czech Republic)	3–3 (a.e.t.)	(Denmark) Copenhagen
Birmančević 80'; Laçi 105'; Olatunji 107'	Report	Larsson 1'; Claesson 105+2', 112'
Penalties
Krejčí (penalty missed); Laçi (penalty scored); Kairinen (penalty scored); Sørensen (penalty missed)	2–4	(penalty scored) Diks; (penalty scored) Claesson; (penalty scored) Boilesen; (penalty scored) Bardghji

Stadion Letná, Prague
Attendance: 18,109
Referee: Serdar Gözübüyük (Netherlands)

3–3 on aggregate; Copenhagen won 4–2 on penalties.

8 August 2023
20:45 (19:45 UTC+1)

KÍ (Faroe Islands)	2–1	(Norway) Molde
Frederiksberg 64', 86'	Report	Eikrem 49'

Tórsvøllur, Tórshavn (Note: KÍ played their third qualifying home match at the Tórsvøllur in Tórshavn, instead of their regular stadium, Við Djúpumýrar, in Klaksvík, which did not meet UEFA requirements.)
Attendance: 4,584
Referee: Aliyar Aghayev (Azerbaijan)
15 August 2023
19:00

Molde (Norway)	2–0 (a.e.t.)	(Faroe Islands) KÍ
Eriksen 17'; Linnes 112'	Report

Aker Stadion, Molde
Attendance: 10,346
Referee: Nikola Dabanović (Montenegro)

Molde won 3–2 on aggregate.

=== League Path matches ===
8 August 2023
21:00 (20:00 UTC+1)

Braga (Portugal)	3–0	(Serbia) TSC
Bruma 17'; Pizzi 19'; Djaló 87'	Report

Estádio Municipal, Braga
Attendance: 22,186
Referee: Harald Lechner (Austria)
15 August 2023
20:00

TSC (Serbia)	1–4	(Portugal) Braga
Rakonjac 40'	Report	Pizzi 9'; Bruma 13'; Djaló 16'; Al-Musrati 20'

TSC Arena, Bačka Topola
Attendance: 4,200
Referee: Jakob Kehlet (Denmark)

Braga won 7–1 on aggregate.

9 August 2023
20:45 (19:45 UTC+1)

Rangers (Scotland)	2–1	(Switzerland) Servette
Tavernier 6' (pen.); Dessers 15'	Report	Bedia 44' (pen.)

Ibrox Stadium, Glasgow
Attendance: 48,956
Referee: Donatas Rumšas (Lithuania)
15 August 2023
20:30

Servette (Switzerland)	1–1	(Scotland) Rangers
Kutesa 22'	Report	Tavernier 51'

Stade de Genève, Geneva
Attendance: 26,000
Referee: Maurizio Mariani (Italy)

Rangers won 3–2 on aggregate.

9 August 2023
20:00 (21:00 UTC+3)

Panathinaikos (Greece)	1–0	(France) Marseille
Bernard 83'	Report

Leoforos Alexandras Stadium, Athens
Attendance: 11,270
Referee: István Kovács (Romania)
15 August 2023
21:00

Marseille (France)	2–1 (a.e.t.)	(Greece) Panathinaikos
Aubameyang 2', 45+1'	Report	Ioannidis 90+9' (pen.)
Penalties
Guendouzi (penalty missed); Veretout (penalty scored); Sarr (penalty scored); Vitinha (penalty scored)	3–5	(penalty scored) Ioannidis; (penalty scored) Bernard; (penalty scored) Kleinheisler; (penalty scored) Palacios; (penalty scored) Mladenović

Stade Vélodrome, Marseille
Attendance: 63,050
Referee: Michael Oliver (England)

2–2 on aggregate; Panathinaikos won 5–3 on penalties.

8 August 2023
20:30

PSV Eindhoven (Netherlands)	4–1	(Austria) Sturm Graz
Babadi 4'; De Jong 22', 32'; Sangaré 73'	Report	Stanković 40'

Philips Stadion, Eindhoven
Attendance: 31,500
Referee: Radu Petrescu (Romania)
15 August 2023
20:30

Sturm Graz (Austria)	1–3	(Netherlands) PSV Eindhoven
Bøving 26'	Report	Veerman 32'; De Jong 39'; Pepi 85' (pen.)

Liebenauer Stadium, Graz
Attendance: 12,571
Referee: Srđan Jovanović (Serbia)

PSV Eindhoven won 7–2 on aggregate.

== Play-off round ==
The draw for the play-off round was held on 7 August 2023.

=== Seeding ===
A total of 12 teams played in the play-off round. They were divided into two paths:

- Champions Path (8 teams): 2 teams which entered in this round, and 6 winners of the third qualifying round (Champions Path).
- League Path (4 teams): 4 winners of the third qualifying round (League Path).

Seeding of teams was based on their 2023 UEFA club coefficients. For the winners of the third qualifying round, whose identity was not known at the time of draw, the club coefficient of the highest-ranked remaining team in each tie was used. The first team drawn in each tie was the home team of the first leg.

Champions Path
Seeded	Unseeded
(Greece) AEK Athens; (Denmark) Copenhagen; (Switzerland) Young Boys; (Turkey) Galatasaray	(Israel) Maccabi Haifa; (Norway) Molde; (Belgium) Antwerp; (Poland) Raków Częstochowa

League Path
Seeded	Unseeded
(Scotland) Rangers; (Portugal) Braga	(Netherlands) PSV Eindhoven; (Greece) Panathinaikos

Notes

1. ^{†} Winners of the third qualifying round, whose identity was not known at the time of draw. Teams in italics defeated a team with a higher coefficient, thus effectively taking the coefficient of their opponent in the draw.

=== Summary ===
The first legs were played on 22 and 23 August, and the second legs were played on 29 and 30 August 2023.

The winners of the ties advanced to the group stage. The losers were transferred to the Europa League group stage.

Team 1	Agg.	Team 2	1st leg	2nd leg
Champions Path
Maccabi Haifa (Israel)	0–3	(Switzerland) Young Boys	0–0	0–3
Antwerp (Belgium)	3–1	(Greece) AEK Athens	1–0	2–1
Raków Częstochowa (Poland)	1–2	(Denmark) Copenhagen	0–1	1–1
Molde (Norway)	3–5	(Turkey) Galatasaray	2–3	1–2
League Path
Rangers (Scotland)	3–7	(Netherlands) PSV Eindhoven	2–2	1–5
Braga (Portugal)	3–1	(Greece) Panathinaikos	2–1	1–0

=== Champions Path matches ===
23 August 2023
21:00 (22:00 UTC+3)

Maccabi Haifa (Israel)	0–0	(Switzerland) Young Boys
	Report

Sammy Ofer Stadium, Haifa
Attendance: 29,864
Referee: Davide Massa (Italy)
29 August 2023
21:00

Young Boys (Switzerland)	3–0	(Israel) Maccabi Haifa
Itten 23'; Seck 28' (o.g.); Ugrinic 46'	Report

Stadion Wankdorf, Bern
Attendance: 31,500
Referee: Slavko Vinčić (Slovenia)

Young Boys won 3–0 on aggregate.

22 August 2023
21:00

Antwerp (Belgium)	1–0	(Greece) AEK Athens
Janssen 16'	Report

Bosuilstadion, Antwerp
Attendance: 13,376
Referee: François Letexier (France)
30 August 2023
21:00 (22:00 UTC+3)

AEK Athens (Greece)	1–2	(Belgium) Antwerp
Araujo 90'	Report	Kerk 73'; Balikwisha 90+5'

Agia Sophia Stadium, Athens
Attendance: 29,300
Referee: Jesús Gil Manzano (Spain)

Antwerp won 3–1 on aggregate.

22 August 2023
21:00

Raków Częstochowa (Poland)	0–1	(Denmark) Copenhagen
	Report	Racovițan 9' (o.g.)

Zagłębiowski Park Sportowy, Sosnowiec (Note: Raków Częstochowa played their play-off home match at the Zagłębiowski Park Sportowy in Sosnowiec, instead of their regular stadium, the Miejski Stadion Piłkarski "Raków", in Częstochowa, which does not meet UEFA requirements.)
Attendance: 11,600
Referee: Irfan Peljto (Bosnia and Herzegovina)
30 August 2023
21:00

Copenhagen (Denmark)	1–1	(Poland) Raków Częstochowa
Vavro 35'	Report	Zwoliński 87'

Parken Stadium, Copenhagen
Attendance: 34,737
Referee: István Kovács (Romania)

Copenhagen won 2–1 on aggregate.

23 August 2023
21:00

Molde (Norway)	2–3	(Turkey) Galatasaray
Ellingsen 8'; Haugen 56'	Report	Oliveira 25'; Icardi 29'; Midtsjø 90+3'

Aker Stadion, Molde
Attendance: 9,553
Referee: Anthony Taylor (England)
29 August 2023
21:00 (22:00 UTC+3)

Galatasaray (Turkey)	2–1	(Norway) Molde
Icardi 7' (pen.); Angeliño 90+3'	Report	Hestad 66'

Rams Park, Istanbul
Attendance: 47,845
Referee: Szymon Marciniak (Poland)

Galatasaray won 5–3 on aggregate.

=== League Path matches ===
22 August 2023
21:00 (20:00 UTC+1)

Rangers (Scotland)	2–2	(Netherlands) PSV Eindhoven
Sima 45'; Matondo 76'	Report	Sangaré 61'; De Jong 80'

Ibrox Stadium, Glasgow
Attendance: 47,537
Referee: Clément Turpin (France)
30 August 2023
21:00

PSV Eindhoven (Netherlands)	5–1	(Scotland) Rangers
Saibari 35', 53'; De Jong 66'; Veerman 78'; Goldson 81' (o.g.)	Report	Tavernier 64'

Philips Stadion, Eindhoven
Attendance: 34,560
Referee: José María Sánchez Martínez (Spain)

PSV Eindhoven won 7–3 on aggregate.

23 August 2023
21:00 (20:00 UTC+1)

Braga (Portugal)	2–1	(Greece) Panathinaikos
Ruiz 51'; Djaló 73'	Report	Mancini 90+5'

Estádio Municipal, Braga
Attendance: 23,401
Referee: Felix Zwayer (Germany)
29 August 2023
21:00 (22:00 UTC+3)

Panathinaikos (Greece)	0–1	(Portugal) Braga
	Report	Bruma 83'

Olympic Stadium, Athens (Note: Panathinaikos played their play-off home match at the Olympic Stadium in Athens, instead of their regular stadium, the Leoforos Alexandras Stadium, in Athens.)
Attendance: 61,390
Referee: Daniele Orsato (Italy)

Braga won 3–1 on aggregate.
