= 2023–24 UEFA Europa League qualifying =

Union of European Football Associations matches

The 2023–24 UEFA Europa League qualifying phase and play-off round began on 8 August and ended on 31 August 2023.

A total of 27 teams competed in the qualifying system which included the qualifying phase and the play-off round. The 10 winners of the play-off round advanced to the group stage, to join the 12 teams that entered in the group stage, the six losers of the Champions League play-off round (four from Champions Path and two from League Path) and the four League Path losers of the Champions League third qualifying round.

Times are CEST (UTC+2), as listed by UEFA (local times, if different, are in parentheses).

== Teams ==
In the third qualifying round (which was the first round of the qualification for the Europa League), the teams were divided into two paths:

- Champions Path (10 teams): 10 teams which entered this round (10 losers of the Champions League Champions Path second qualifying round).
- Main Path (4 teams): 4 teams which entered this round (including 2 losers of the Champions League League Path second qualifying round).

The winners of the third qualifying round were combined into a single path for the play-off round:

- Play-off round (20 teams): 13 teams which entered this round (including 6 losers of the Champions League Champions Path third qualifying round) and 7 winners of the third qualifying round.

All teams eliminated from the qualifying phase and play-off round entered the Europa Conference League:

- The 5 losers of the Champions Path third qualifying round entered the Champions Path play-off round.
- The 2 losers of the Main Path third qualifying round entered the Main Path play-off round.
- The 10 losers of the play-off round entered the group stage.

Below were the participating teams (with their 2023 UEFA club coefficients, not to be used as seeding for qualifying phase and play-off round, however), grouped by their starting rounds.

Key to colours
Winners of play-off round advanced to group stage
Losers of play-off round entered Europa Conference League group stage
Losers of third qualifying round entered Europa Conference League play-off round

Play-off round
Team	Coeff.
(Netherlands) Ajax	89.000
(Croatia) Dinamo Zagreb	55.000
(Austria) LASK	36.000
(Slovakia) Slovan Bratislava	24.500
(Belgium) Union Saint-Gilloise	19.000
(Ukraine) Zorya Luhansk	16.000
(Czech Republic) Sparta Prague	14.000
(Slovenia) Olimpija Ljubljana	9.000
(Faroe Islands) KÍ	8.000
(Scotland) Aberdeen	8.000
(Serbia) Čukarički	6.475
(Switzerland) Lugano	6.335
(Cyprus) Aris Limassol	4.895

Third qualifying round (Champions Path)
Team	Coeff.
(Azerbaijan) Qarabağ	25.000
(Bulgaria) Ludogorets Razgrad	21.000
(Moldova) Sheriff Tiraspol	19.500
(Belarus) BATE Borisov	15.000
(Kazakhstan) Astana	14.000
(Lithuania) Žalgiris	11.000
(Finland) HJK	11.000
(Bosnia and Herzegovina) Zrinjski Mostar	8.500
(Iceland) Breiðablik	6.000
(Sweden) BK Häcken	4.750

Third qualifying round (Main Path)
Team	Coeff.
(Czech Republic) Slavia Prague	52.000
(Greece) Olympiacos	39.000
(Belgium) Genk	18.000
(Ukraine) Dnipro-1	8.000

Notes

1. ^{CH Q3} Losers of Champions League third qualifying round (Champions Path).
2. ^{CH Q2} Losers of Champions League second qualifying round (Champions Path).
3. ^{LP Q2} Losers of Champions League second qualifying round (League Path).

== Format ==
Each tie was played over two legs, with each team playing one leg at home. The team that scored more goals on aggregate over the two legs advanced to the next round. If the aggregate score was level at the end of normal time of the second leg, extra time was played, and if the same number of goals was scored by both teams during extra time, the tie was decided by a penalty shoot-out.

== Schedule ==
The schedule of the competition was as follows. Matches were scheduled for Thursdays, though exceptionally could take place on Tuesdays or Wednesdays due to scheduling conflicts.

Schedule for the qualifying phase of the 2023–24 UEFA Europa League
Round	Draw date	First leg	Second leg
Third qualifying round	24 July 2023	10 August 2023	17 August 2023
Play-off round	7 August 2023	24 August 2023	31 August 2023

== Third qualifying round ==
The draw for the third qualifying round was held on 24 July 2023.

=== Seeding ===
A total of 14 teams played in the qualifying round. They were divided into two paths:

- Champions Path (10 teams): 10 losers of the 2023–24 UEFA Champions League second qualifying round (Champions Path), whose identity was not known at the time of draw. There was no seeding.
- Main Path (4 teams): The teams were seeded as follows:
  - Seeded: 2 teams which entered in this round.
  - Unseeded: 2 losers of the 2023–24 UEFA Champions League second qualifying round (League Path), whose identity was not known at the time of draw.

Teams from the same association could not be drawn against each other. The first team drawn in each tie was the home team of the first leg.

Since Olympiacos could not be drawn against Panathinaikos, they were drawn against the loser of the Servette/Genk match, and Slavia Prague were drawn against the loser of the Dnipro-1/Panathinaikos match.

Champions Path
Group 1	Group 2
(Lithuania) Žalgiris; (Azerbaijan) Qarabağ; (Sweden) BK Häcken; (Finland) HJK; (Iceland) Breiðablik; (Bosnia and Herzegovina) Zrinjski Mostar	(Bulgaria) Ludogorets Razgrad; (Belarus) BATE Borisov; (Moldova) Sheriff Tiraspol; (Kazakhstan) Astana

Main Path
Seeded	Unseeded
(Czech Republic) Slavia Prague; (Greece) Olympiacos	(Belgium) Genk; (Ukraine) Dnipro-1

Notes

1. ^{†} Losers of the UEFA Champions League second qualifying round, whose identity was not known at the time of draw.

=== Summary ===
The first legs were played on 8 and 10 August, and the second legs were played on 17 August 2023.

The winners of the ties advanced to the play-off round. The losers were transferred to the Europa Conference League play-off round of their respective path.

Team 1	Agg.	Team 2	1st leg	2nd leg
Champions Path
Žalgiris (Lithuania)	1–8	(Sweden) BK Häcken	1–3	0–5
Qarabağ (Azerbaijan)	4–2	(Finland) HJK	2–1	2–1
Zrinjski Mostar (Bosnia and Herzegovina)	6–3	(Iceland) Breiðablik	6–2	0–1
Sheriff Tiraspol (Moldova)	7–3	(Belarus) BATE Borisov	5–1	2–2
Astana (Kazakhstan)	3–6	(Bulgaria) Ludogorets Razgrad	2–1	1–5
Main Path
Olympiacos (Greece)	2–1	(Belgium) Genk	1–0	1–1
Slavia Prague (Czech Republic)	4–1	(Ukraine) Dnipro-1	3–0	1–1

=== Champions Path matches ===
10 August 2023
18:00 (19:00 UTC+3)

Žalgiris (Lithuania)	1–3	(Sweden) BK Häcken
Hnid 85'	Report	Hrstić 38', 48'; Rygaard 70'

LFF Stadium, Vilnius
Attendance: 4,789
Referee: Mykola Balakin (Ukraine)
17 August 2023
19:00

BK Häcken (Sweden)	5–0	(Lithuania) Žalgiris
Hrstić 27'; Gustafson 56'; Sadiq 63', 73' (pen.); Sonko 90+2'	Report

Bravida Arena, Gothenburg
Attendance: 3,926
Referee: António Nobre (Portugal)

BK Häcken won 8–1 on aggregate.

10 August 2023
18:00 (20:00 UTC+4)

Qarabağ (Azerbaijan)	2–1	(Finland) HJK
L. Andrade 55'; Juninho 85'	Report	Olusanya 77'

Tofiq Bahramov Republican Stadium, Baku
Attendance: 24,984
Referee: Roi Reinshreiber (Israel)
17 August 2023
18:00 (19:00 UTC+3)

HJK (Finland)	1–2	(Azerbaijan) Qarabağ
Hostikka 10'	Report	Bayramov 45+3' (pen.); Benzia 56'

Bolt Arena, Helsinki
Attendance: 7,612
Referee: Willy Delajod (France)

Qarabağ won 4–2 on aggregate.

10 August 2023
21:00

Zrinjski Mostar (Bosnia and Herzegovina)	6–2	(Iceland) Breiðablik
Kiš 2', 30'; Malekinušić 22', 40'; Bilbija 33'; Ivančić 55'	Report	Lúðvíksson 64'; Eyjólfsson 74'

Stadion pod Bijelim Brijegom, Mostar
Attendance: 6,200
Referee: Nick Walsh (Scotland)
17 August 2023
19:30 (17:30 UTC+0)

Breiðablik (Iceland)	1–0	(Bosnia and Herzegovina) Zrinjski Mostar
Jakovljević 56' (o.g.)	Report

Kópavogsvöllur, Kópavogur
Attendance: 673
Referee: Anastasios Papapetrou (Greece)

Zrinjski Mostar won 6–3 on aggregate.

10 August 2023
19:00 (20:00 UTC+3)

Sheriff Tiraspol (Moldova)	5–1	(Belarus) BATE Borisov
Ankeye 12', 47'; Badolo 32'; Yansané 90+3', 90+8'	Report	Bane 50'

Sheriff Arena, Tiraspol
Attendance: 5,400
Referee: Mohammed Al-Hakim (Sweden)
17 August 2023
20:00

BATE Borisov (Belarus)	2–2	(Moldova) Sheriff Tiraspol
Kontsevoy 25'; Laptev 90+4'	Report	Ricardinho 40' (pen.); Luvannor 45+2' (pen.)

Mezőkövesdi Városi Stadion, Mezőkövesd, Hungary (Note: Due to the country's involvement in the Russian invasion of Ukraine, Belarusian teams were required to play their home matches at neutral venues and behind closed doors until further notice.)
Attendance: 0
Referee: Tamás Bognár (Hungary)

Sheriff Tiraspol won 7–3 on aggregate.

8 August 2023
16:00 (20:00 UTC+6)

Astana (Kazakhstan)	2–1	(Bulgaria) Ludogorets Razgrad
Tomašević 40'; Marochkin 53'	Report	Sonko Sundberg 34'

Astana Arena, Astana
Attendance: 23,967
Referee: Horațiu Feșnic (Romania)
17 August 2023
20:00 (21:00 UTC+3)

Ludogorets Razgrad (Bulgaria)	5–1	(Kazakhstan) Astana
Tekpetey 25', 50'; Piotrowski 47', 58'; Despodov 67'	Report	Darboe 29'

Huvepharma Arena, Razgrad
Attendance: 5,469
Referee: Anthony Taylor (England)

Ludogorets Razgrad won 6–3 on aggregate.

=== Main Path matches ===
10 August 2023
21:00 (22:00 UTC+3)

Olympiacos (Greece)	1–0	(Belgium) Genk
Fortounis 1'	Report

Karaiskakis Stadium, Piraeus
Attendance: 24,123
Referee: Glenn Nyberg (Sweden)
17 August 2023
20:00

Genk (Belgium)	1–1	(Greece) Olympiacos
Paintsil 30' (pen.)	Report	Alexandropoulos 90+6'

Cegeka Arena, Genk
Attendance: 11,998
Referee: Tobias Stieler (Germany)

Olympiacos won 2–1 on aggregate.

10 August 2023
19:00

Slavia Prague (Czech Republic)	3–0	(Ukraine) Dnipro-1
Schranz 5', 37'; Wallem 81'	Report

Fortuna Arena, Prague
Attendance: 19,102
Referee: Lawrence Visser (Belgium)
17 August 2023
20:00

Dnipro-1 (Ukraine)	1–1	(Czech Republic) Slavia Prague
Rubchynskyi 45+1'	Report	Jurečka 52'

Košická futbalová aréna, Košice, Slovakia (Note: Due to the Russian invasion of Ukraine, Ukrainian teams were required to play their home matches at neutral venues until further notice.)
Attendance: 5,855
Referee: Jesús Gil Manzano (Spain)

Slavia Prague won 4–1 on aggregate.

== Play-off round ==
The draw for the play-off round was held on 7 August 2023.

=== Seeding ===
A total of 20 teams played in the play-off round. The teams were seeded into four "priority groups":

- Priority 1: The 6 teams from the higher ranking association which entered in this round
- Priority 2: 6 losers of the 2023–24 UEFA Champions League third qualifying round (Champions Path), whose identity was not known at the time of the draw
- Priority 3: 5 winners of the third qualifying round (Champions Path), whose identity was not known at the time of the draw
- Priority 4: The remaining team which entered in this round and 2 winners of the third qualifying round (Main Path), whose identity was not known at the time of the draw

The procedure of the draw was as follows:

1. Three teams from Pot 1 (Priority 1) were paired with the three teams in Pot 4 (Priority 4).
2. The three remaining Pot 1 (Priority 1) teams would then be paired with teams from Pot 3 (Priority 3).
3. The two remaining Pot 3 (Priority 3) teams work would then be paired with teams from Pot 2 (Priority 2).
4. The four remaining Pot 2 (Priority 2) balls were then drawn one after another to complete the ninth and tenth pairings (open draw).

Association protection was not applied. The first team drawn in each tie was the home team of the first leg.

Priority 1	Priority 2	Priority 3	Priority 4
(Netherlands) Ajax; (Austria) LASK; (Scotland) Aberdeen; (Serbia) Čukarički; (Ukraine) Zorya Luhansk; (Belgium) Union Saint-Gilloise	(Cyprus) Aris Limassol; (Slovakia) Slovan Bratislava; (Croatia) Dinamo Zagreb; (Slovenia) Olimpija Ljubljana; (Czech Republic) Sparta Prague; (Faroe Islands) KÍ	(Sweden) BK Häcken; (Azerbaijan) Qarabağ; (Bosnia and Herzegovina) Zrinjski Mostar; (Moldova) Sheriff Tiraspol; (Bulgaria) Ludogorets Razgrad	(Switzerland) Lugano; (Greece) Olympiacos; (Czech Republic) Slavia Prague

Notes

1. ^{†} Winners of the third qualifying round, whose identity was not known at the time of draw.
2. ^{††} Losers of the UEFA Champions League third qualifying round, whose identity was not known at the time of draw.

=== Summary ===
The first legs were played on 24 August and the second legs were played on 31 August 2023.

The winners of the ties advanced to the group stage. The losers were transferred to the Europa Conference League group stage.

Team 1	Agg.	Team 2	1st leg	2nd leg
Slavia Prague (Czech Republic)	3–2	(Ukraine) Zorya Luhansk	2–0	1–2
Olympiacos (Greece)	6–1	(Serbia) Čukarički	3–1	3–0
Union Saint-Gilloise (Belgium)	3–0	(Switzerland) Lugano	2–0	1–0
Ludogorets Razgrad (Bulgaria)	2–4	(Netherlands) Ajax	1–4	1–0
BK Häcken (Sweden)	5–3	(Scotland) Aberdeen	2–2	3–1
LASK (Austria)	3–2	(Bosnia and Herzegovina) Zrinjski Mostar	2–1	1–1
KÍ (Faroe Islands)	2–3	(Moldova) Sheriff Tiraspol	1–1	1–2
Olimpija Ljubljana (Slovenia)	1–3	(Azerbaijan) Qarabağ	0–2	1–1
Slovan Bratislava (Slovakia)	4–7	(Cyprus) Aris Limassol	2–1	2–6
Dinamo Zagreb (Croatia)	4–5	(Czech Republic) Sparta Prague	3–1	1–4

=== Matches ===
24 August 2023
19:00

Slavia Prague (Czech Republic)	2–0	(Ukraine) Zorya Luhansk
Tijani 81'; Masopust 90+4'	Report

Fortuna Arena, Prague
Attendance: 18,522
Referee: Kristo Tohver (Estonia)
31 August 2023
19:00

Zorya Luhansk (Ukraine)	2–1	(Czech Republic) Slavia Prague
Alefirenko 32'; Antyukh 41'	Report	Jurásek 83'

Arena Lublin, Lublin, Poland
Attendance: 964
Referee: Jérôme Brisard (France)

Slavia Prague won 3–2 on aggregate.

24 August 2023
21:00 (22:00 UTC+3)

Olympiacos (Greece)	3–1	(Serbia) Čukarički
El Kaabi 3', 40'; Fortounis 16'	Report	Miladinović 90+3'

Karaiskakis Stadium, Piraeus
Attendance: 24,332
Referee: Donatas Rumšas (Lithuania)
31 August 2023
20:00

Čukarički (Serbia)	0–3	(Greece) Olympiacos
	Report	Masouras 34'; Biel 45+1'; Retsos 53'

Dubočica Stadium, Leskovac (Note: Čukarički played their home match at the Dubočica Stadium in Leskovac, instead of their regular stadium, Čukarički Stadium, in Belgrade, which did not meet UEFA requirements.)
Attendance: 6,812
Referee: Danny Makkelie (Netherlands)

Olympiacos won 6–1 on aggregate.

24 August 2023
20:30

Union Saint-Gilloise (Belgium)	2–0	(Switzerland) Lugano
Eckert 8'; Terho 71'	Report

Constant Vanden Stock Stadium, Brussels (Note: Union Saint-Gilloise played their home match at Constant Vanden Stock Stadium, Brussels, instead of their regular stadium, Joseph Marien Stadium, Brussels, which did not meet UEFA requirements.)
Attendance: 7,238
Referee: Enea Jorgji (Albania)
31 August 2023
20:30

Lugano (Switzerland)	0–1	(Belgium) Union Saint-Gilloise
	Report	Eckert 7'

Stade de Genève, Geneva (Note: Lugano played their home match at the Stade de Genève in Geneva, instead of their regular stadium, the Cornaredo Stadium in Lugano, which did not meet UEFA requirements.)
Attendance: 1,171
Referee: Harm Osmers (Germany)

Union Saint-Gilloise won 3–0 on aggregate.

24 August 2023
20:00 (21:00 UTC+3)

Ludogorets Razgrad (Bulgaria)	1–4	(Netherlands) Ajax
Verdon 70' (pen.)	Report	Kudus 16', 18', 50'; Brobbey 40'

Huvepharma Arena, Razgrad
Attendance: 9,880
Referee: Marco Di Bello (Italy)
31 August 2023
20:00

Ajax (Netherlands)	0–1	(Bulgaria) Ludogorets Razgrad
	Report	Tissera 62'

Johan Cruyff Arena, Amsterdam
Attendance: 50,900
Referee: Ivan Kružliak (Slovakia)

Ajax won 4–2 on aggregate.

24 August 2023
19:00

BK Häcken (Sweden)	2–2	(Scotland) Aberdeen
Layouni 36'; Sadiq 69' (pen.)	Report	Miovski 75'; Devlin 79'

Bravida Arena, Gothenburg
Attendance: 4,424
Referee: Filip Glova (Slovakia)
31 August 2023
20:45 (19:45 UTC+1)

Aberdeen (Scotland)	1–3	(Sweden) BK Häcken
Miovski 56' (pen.)	Report	Sadiq 14', 41'; Layouni 81' (pen.)

Pittodrie Stadium, Aberdeen
Attendance: 19,237
Referee: Daniel Siebert (Germany)

BK Häcken won 5–3 on aggregate.

24 August 2023
21:00

LASK (Austria)	2–1	(Bosnia and Herzegovina) Zrinjski Mostar
Žulj 4', 12'	Report	Bilbija 71'

Raiffeisen Arena, Linz
Attendance: 8,300
Referee: Orel Grinfeld (Israel)
31 August 2023
21:00

Zrinjski Mostar (Bosnia and Herzegovina)	1–1	(Austria) LASK
Bilbija 38' (pen.)	Report	Jovičić 52'

Stadion pod Bijelim Brijegom, Mostar
Attendance: 6,520
Referee: Tiago Martins (Portugal)

LASK won 3–2 on aggregate.

24 August 2023
20:45 (19:45 UTC+1)

KÍ (Faroe Islands)	1–1	(Moldova) Sheriff Tiraspol
Da Silva 52'	Report	Ngom Mbekeli 73'

Tórsvøllur, Tórshavn (Note: KÍ played their home match at the Tórsvøllur in Tórshavn, instead of their regular stadium, Við Djúpumýrar, in Klaksvík, which did not meet UEFA requirements.)
Attendance: 3,413
Referee: Rade Obrenovič (Slovenia)
31 August 2023
19:00 (20:00 UTC+3)

Sheriff Tiraspol (Moldova)	2–1	(Faroe Islands) KÍ
Luvannor 16' (pen.); Zohouri 74'	Report	Kassi 34'

Sheriff Arena, Tiraspol
Attendance: 5,493
Referee: Halil Umut Meler (Turkey)

Sheriff Tiraspol won 3–2 on aggregate.

24 August 2023
20:00

Olimpija Ljubljana (Slovenia)	0–2	(Azerbaijan) Qarabağ
	Report	Medina 32'; Andrade 44'

Stožice Stadium, Ljubljana
Attendance: 6,123
Referee: Georgi Kabakov (Bulgaria)
31 August 2023
18:00 (20:00 UTC+4)

Qarabağ (Azerbaijan)	1–1	(Slovenia) Olimpija Ljubljana
Bayramov 24' (pen.)	Report	Pinto 36'

Tofiq Bahramov Republican Stadium, Baku
Attendance: 27,354
Referee: Alejandro Hernández Hernández (Spain)

Qarabağ won 3–1 on aggregate.

24 August 2023
20:30

Slovan Bratislava (Slovakia)	2–1	(Cyprus) Aris Limassol
Tolić 34'; Strelec 57'	Report	Mayambela 73'

Tehelné pole, Bratislava
Attendance: 17,564
Referee: Willie Collum (Scotland)
31 August 2023
19:00 (20:00 UTC+3)

Aris Limassol (Cyprus)	6–2	(Slovakia) Slovan Bratislava
Gomis 21', 45+7', 51'; Szöke 24'; Mayambela 67'; Brown 72'	Report	Strelec 37'; Barseghyan 89'

Alphamega Stadium, Limassol
Attendance: 2,872
Referee: Erik Lambrechts (Belgium)

Aris Limassol won 7–4 on aggregate.

24 August 2023
20:00

Dinamo Zagreb (Croatia)	3–1	(Czech Republic) Sparta Prague
Špikić 44'; Perić 59'; Ivanušec 61'	Report	Krejčí 39' (pen.)

Stadion Maksimir, Zagreb
Attendance: 12,170
Referee: Marco Guida (Italy)
31 August 2023
19:00

Sparta Prague (Czech Republic)	4–1	(Croatia) Dinamo Zagreb
Haraslín 2'; Sørensen 24'; Panák 67'; Olatunji 87'	Report	Baturina 71'

Stadion Letná, Prague
Attendance: 17,953
Referee: Tobias Stieler (Germany)

Sparta Prague won 5–4 on aggregate.
