= Sidi Bane =

Senegalese footballer (born 2004)

Personal information
- Date of birth: 14 January 2004 (age 22)
- Place of birth: Pire Goureye, Senegal
- Height: 1.84 m (6 ft 0 in)
- Position: Centre-back

Team information
- Current team: Laval
- Number: 24

Youth career
- 2012–2020: USP Goureye

Senior career*
Years	Team	Apps	(Gls)
2020–2022	USP Goureye	15	(4)
2022–2024	BATE Borisov	28	(4)
2024–2025	Lens II	9	(1)
2025	Lens	0	(0)
2025	→ Annecy (loan)	14	(0)
2025–2026	AVS	9	(1)
2026–	Laval	8	(0)
2026–	Laval B	1	(0)
- * Club domestic league appearances and goals as of 9 May 2026

Sidi Bane (born 14 January 2004) is a Senegalese professional footballer who plays as a centre-back for French Ligue 2 club Laval.

== Career ==
A youth product of the Senegalese club Union Sportive de Pire since the age of 12, Bane joined their senior team in 2020. He transferred to the Belarusian Premier League club BATE Borisov on 22 April 2022. He made his senior and professional debut with BATE Borisov in a 3–0 win over Dynamo Brest on 28 May 2022. On 13 August 2024, he transferred to RC Lens signing a contract until 2028. First assigned to Lens' reserves, he joined Annecy on loan on 17 January 2025 for the second half of the 2024–25 season in Ligue 2.

On 6 August 2025, Bane signed a two-season contract with AVS in Portugal. On 27 January 2026, having scored 1 goal in 10 appearances for the Primeira Liga side, his contract was terminated by mutual agreement.

== Playing style ==
Originally a midfielder, Bane is a modern defender who is disciplined and technically skilled. He makes strong runs, and is hard worker who goes eagerly into duels. His playstyle has been compared to Aurélien Tchouaméni.
